= 1978–79 Philadelphia Flyers season =

NHL hockey team season

1978–79 Philadelphia Flyers
- Division: 2nd Patrick
- Conference: 2nd Campbell
- 1978–79 record: 40–25–15
- Home record: 26–10–4
- Road record: 14–15–11
- Goals for: 281 (8th)
- Goals against: 248 (3rd)

Team information
- General manager: Keith Allen
- Coach: Bob McCammon (Oct.–Jan.); Pat Quinn (Jan.–Apr.)
- Captain: Bobby Clarke
- Alternate captains: None (Note: The alternate captain position was abolished from the 1975–76 season through the 1984–85 season.)
- Arena: Spectrum
- Average attendance: 17,077
- Minor league affiliates: Maine Mariners; Milwaukee Admirals; Jersey Aces

Team leaders
- Goals: Bill Barber (34); Reggie Leach (34)
- Assists: Bobby Clarke (57)
- Points: Bill Barber (87)
- Penalty minutes: Behn Wilson (197)
- Plus/minus: Blake Dunlop (+27)
- Wins: Wayne Stephenson (20)
- Goals against average: Robbie Moore (1.77)

The 1978–79 Philadelphia Flyers season was the franchise's 12th season in the National Hockey League (NHL).

== Off-season ==
Head coach Fred Shero, who had one more year left on his contract, submitted a letter of resignation on May 22, 1978, stating that the Flyers needed a change whether they realized it or not. Flyers management had previously heard rumors about Shero wanting to leave Philadelphia and re-join the New York Rangers organization, and refused to accept his letter of resignation. Shero then signed a $250,000, five-year contract with the Rangers to be their new head coach and general manager, believing he no longer had a contractual agreement to the Flyers. A few weeks after signing Shero, the Rangers gave the Flyers their first-round pick (7th overall) in the 1978 draft and cash as compensation, allowing the Rangers to avoid tampering charges. Bob McCammon, who had just coached the Flyers' first year American Hockey League Maine Mariners farm club to a Calder Cup title, was named Shero's replacement on July 6.

The Flyers acquired the 6th overall pick from the Pittsburgh Penguins for three veterans from their Stanley Cup championship teams – Tom Bladon, Orest Kindrachuk and Ross Lonsberry – on the eve of the draft. The trade gave the Flyers three first-round picks and they selected defenseman Behn Wilson and forwards Ken Linseman and Dan Lucas.

Two other longtime Flyers also left the team during the off-season. Gary Dornhoefer retired and Joe Watson was traded to the Colorado Rockies.

== Regular season ==
After an eight-game winless streak in January that saw the team drop to last place in the division, McCammon and assistant coach Terry Crisp were fired. Replacing him was Shero's previous assistant coach Pat Quinn, who had replaced McCammon as head coach in Maine. While McCammon returned to Maine and coached the Mariners to a second consecutive Calder Cup title, the Flyers rallied under Quinn and finished in second place.

On February 17, 1979, Bernie Parent suffered a career-ending eye injury in a game against the New York Rangers. An errant stick entered the right eye hole of his mask, causing permanent damage to his vision. After hospitalization, including the complete loss of sight for two weeks, Parent recovered and eventually regained sight, although not at the level required to resume his playing career.

=== Season standings ===
Patrick Division
	GP	W	L	T	GF	GA	Pts
New York Islanders	80	51	15	14	358	214	116
Philadelphia Flyers	80	40	25	15	281	248	95
New York Rangers	80	40	29	11	316	292	91
Atlanta Flames	80	41	31	8	327	280	90

=== Record vs. opponents ===
Patrick Division record vs. opponents

Vs. Campbell Conference

Vs. Wales Conference

Vs. Patrick Division

1978–79 NHL records
Team	ATL	NYI	NYR	PHI	Total
Atlanta	—	2–6	4–3–1	4–4	10–13–1
N.Y. Islanders	6–2	—	5–3	5–1–2	16–6–2
N.Y. Rangers	3–4–1	3–5	—	2–3–3	8–12–4
Philadelphia	4–4	1–5–2	3–2–3	—	8–11–5

Vs. Smythe Division

1978–79 NHL records
Team	CHI	COL	STL	VAN	Total
Atlanta	2–1–2	4–0	4–1	2–2	12–4–2
N.Y. Islanders	3–2	4–0–1	3–0–2	4–0	14–2–3
N.Y. Rangers	4–0	4–1	3–2	4–0	15–3–0
Philadelphia	1–3	3–0–1	4–1	2–1–1	10–5–2

Vs. Adams Division

1978–79 NHL records
Team	BOS	BUF	MIN	TOR	Total
Atlanta	1–3	2–2–1	1–2–1	4–1	8–8–2
N.Y. Islanders	2–1–2	1–2–1	3–1	3–1	9–5–3
N.Y. Rangers	2–3	2–1–1	1–2–1	2–2–1	7–8–3
Philadelphia	3–1–1	3–0–2	2–2	2–2–1	10–5–4

Vs. Norris Division

1978–79 NHL records
Team	DET	LAK	MTL	PIT	WSH	Total
Atlanta	3–0–1	2–2	1–3	3–0–1	2–1–1	11–6–3
N.Y. Islanders	3–0–1	2–0–2	3–1	1–0–3	3–1	12–2–6
N.Y. Rangers	1–1–2	3–1	3–1	2–2	1–1–2	10–6–4
Philadelphia	2–0–2	4–0	0–3–1	3–1	3–0–1	12–4–4

== Playoffs ==
Matched-up against the Vancouver Canucks in the preliminary round, the Flyers won the series in three games. The Flyers' season came to an end against Shero's Rangers in a five-game quarterfinal loss.

== Schedule and results ==
=== Regular season ===
1978–79 regular season
October: 3–4–2, 8 points (home: 2–3–0; road: 1–1–2)

Game	Date	Score	Opponent	Decision	Record	Points	Recap
1	October 12	3–3	@ New York Rangers	Parent	0–0–1	1	T
2	October 14	3–1	@ Detroit Red Wings	Parent	1–0–1	3	W
3	October 15	2–3	Montreal Canadiens	Parent	1–1–1	3	L
4	October 19	3–1	Pittsburgh Penguins	Parent	2–1–1	5	W
5	October 21	0–2	@ Toronto Maple Leafs	Parent	2–2–1	5	L
6	October 22	2–5	Atlanta Flames	Parent	2–3–1	5	L
7	October 24	4–4	@ New York Islanders	Stephenson	2–3–2	6	T
8	October 26	5–0	Toronto Maple Leafs	Parent	3–3–2	8	W
9	October 29	2–5	Vancouver Canucks	Stephenson	3–4–2	8	L

November: 9–4–2, 20 points (home: 4–1–1; road: 5–3–1)

Game	Date	Score	Opponent	Decision	Record	Points	Recap
10	November 1	0–3	@ Atlanta Flames	Parent	3–5–2	8	L
11	November 2	3–3	Buffalo Sabres	Stephenson	3–5–3	9	T
12	November 4	7–3	@ Boston Bruins	Stephenson	4–5–3	11	W
13	November 5	6–4	Colorado Rockies	Parent	5–5–3	13	W
14	November 8	5–3	@ Los Angeles Kings	Parent	6–5–3	15	W
15	November 10	2–2	@ Colorado Rockies	Parent	6–5–4	16	T
16	November 12	4–0	@ Vancouver Canucks	Parent	7–5–4	18	W
17	November 16	3–4	Chicago Black Hawks	Parent	7–6–4	18	L
18	November 18	2–8	@ New York Islanders	Parent	7–7–4	18	L
19	November 19	4–3	Detroit Red Wings	Parent	8–7–4	20	W
20	November 22	3–2	@ Buffalo Sabres	Parent	9–7–4	22	W
21	November 24	4–3	Minnesota North Stars	Stephenson	10–7–4	24	W
22	November 25	3–1	@ Pittsburgh Penguins	Parent	11–7–4	26	W
23	November 28	0–3	@ Montreal Canadiens	Parent	11–8–4	26	L
24	November 30	3–0	St. Louis Blues	Stephenson	12–8–4	28	W

December: 7–5–2, 16 points (home: 6–1–0; road: 1–4–2)

Game	Date	Score	Opponent	Decision	Record	Points	Recap
25	December 2	3–5	@ Boston Bruins	Parent	12–9–4	28	L
26	December 3	7–2	Toronto Maple Leafs	Stephenson	13–9–4	30	W
27	December 7	2–5	New York Rangers	Stephenson	13–10–4	30	L
28	December 9	9–2	Boston Bruins	Parent	14–10–4	32	W
29	December 10	4–0	@ New York Rangers	Parent	15–10–4	34	W
30	December 14	2–1	Pittsburgh Penguins	Parent	16–10–4	36	W
31	December 16	2–7	@ Atlanta Flames	Parent	16–11–4	36	L
32	December 17	4–1	St. Louis Blues	Peeters	17–11–4	38	W
33	December 19	4–4	@ Washington Capitals	Peeters	17–11–5	39	T
34	December 21	5–2	Washington Capitals	Parent	18–11–5	41	W
35	December 23	2–5	@ Chicago Black Hawks	Peeters	18–12–5	41	L
36	December 26	2–2	@ Detroit Red Wings	Parent	18–12–6	42	T
37	December 28	6–5	New York Rangers	Parent	19–12–6	44	W
38	December 30	3–6	@ St. Louis Blues	Peeters	19–13–6	44	L

January: 3–4–5, 11 points (home: 2–1–3; road: 1–3–2)

Game	Date	Score	Opponent	Decision	Record	Points	Recap
39	January 4	3–2	New York Islanders	Parent	20–13–6	46	W
40	January 6	1–5	@ New York Islanders	Parent	20–14–6	46	L
41	January 7	3–0	Los Angeles Kings	Parent	21–14–6	48	W
42	January 9	5–2	@ Washington Capitals	Stephenson	22–14–6	50	W
43	January 11	3–3	Detroit Red Wings	Parent	22–14–7	51	T
44	January 14	1–1	New York Islanders	Stephenson	22–14–8	52	T
45	January 16	0–5	@ Atlanta Flames	Parent	22–15–8	52	L
46	January 18	4–4	Buffalo Sabres	Stephenson	22–15–9	53	T
47	January 20	5–5	@ Montreal Canadiens	Stephenson	22–15–10	54	T
48	January 21	5–5	@ New York Rangers	Parent	22–15–11	55	T
49	January 27	1–3	@ Minnesota North Stars	Stephenson	22–16–11	55	L
50	January 29	3–7	Montreal Canadiens	Parent	22–17–11	55	L

February: 5–2–2, 12 points (home: 3–2–0; road: 2–0–2)

Game	Date	Score	Opponent	Decision	Record	Points	Recap
51	February 1	1–4	New York Islanders	Stephenson	22–18–11	55	L
52	February 4	7–4	Atlanta Flames	Stephenson	23–18–11	57	W
53	February 14	2–2	@ Toronto Maple Leafs	Parent	23–18–12	58	T
54	February 15	5–3	Boston Bruins	Stephenson	24–18–12	60	W
55	February 17	2–4	New York Rangers	Stephenson	24–19–12	60	L
56	February 18	3–2	Minnesota North Stars	Stephenson	25–19–12	62	W
57	February 20	3–3	@ Vancouver Canucks	Stephenson	25–19–13	63	T
58	February 23	5–3	@ Colorado Rockies	Stephenson	26–19–13	65	W
59	February 24	4–3	@ Los Angeles Kings	Stephenson	27–19–13	67	W

March: 11–4–2, 24 points (home: 7–1–0; road: 4–3–2)

Game	Date	Score	Opponent	Decision	Record	Points	Recap
60	March 1	4–4	@ Boston Bruins	St. Croix	27–19–14	68	T
61	March 3	3–4	@ Toronto Maple Leafs	St. Croix	27–20–14	68	L
62	March 4	6–1	@ Buffalo Sabres	Stephenson	28–20–14	70	W
63	March 6	5–0	Colorado Rockies	Moore	29–20–14	72	W
64	March 8	1–5	Chicago Black Hawks	Stephenson	29–21–14	72	L
65	March 10	2–3	@ Pittsburgh Penguins	Stephenson	29–22–14	72	L
66	March 11	6–3	Los Angeles Kings	Stephenson	30–22–14	74	W
67	March 14	4–0	@ Chicago Black Hawks	Stephenson	31–22–14	76	W
68	March 15	5–4	Atlanta Flames	Stephenson	32–22–14	78	W
69	March 17	5–3	Buffalo Sabres	Stephenson	33–22–14	80	W
70	March 18	5–3	St. Louis Blues	Moore	34–22–14	82	W
71	March 21	3–7	@ Minnesota North Stars	Stephenson	34–23–14	82	L
72	March 23	4–1	@ Atlanta Flames	Stephenson	35–23–14	84	W
73	March 25	7–4	Washington Capitals	Stephenson	36–23–14	86	W
74	March 27	4–4	@ New York Rangers	Moore	36–23–15	87	T
75	March 29	5–0	Vancouver Canucks	Moore	37–23–15	89	W
76	March 31	4–2	@ St. Louis Blues	Stephenson	38–23–15	91	W

April: 2–2–0, 4 points (home: 2–1–0; road: 0–1–0)

Game	Date	Score	Opponent	Decision	Record	Points	Recap
77	April 1	7–3	New York Rangers	Stephenson	39–23–15	93	W
78	April 5	1–3	New York Islanders	Stephenson	39–24–15	93	L
79	April 7	2–9	@ New York Islanders	Stephenson	39–25–15	93	L
80	April 8	4–2	Atlanta Flames	Stephenson	40–25–15	95	W

Legend: W Win (2 points) L Loss (0 points) T Tie (1 point)

=== Playoffs ===
1979 Stanley Cup playoffs
Preliminary Round vs. Vancouver Canucks – Flyers win 2–1

Game	Date	Score	Opponent	Decision	Series	Recap
1	April 10	2–3	Vancouver Canucks	Stephenson	Canucks lead 1–0	L
2	April 12	6–4	@ Vancouver Canucks	Moore	Series tied 1–1	W
3	April 14	7–2	Vancouver Canucks	Moore	Flyers win 2–1	W

Quarterfinals vs. New York Rangers – Rangers win 4–1

Game	Date	Score	Opponent	Decision	Series	Recap
1	April 16	3–2 OT	New York Rangers	Moore	Flyers lead 1–0	W
2	April 18	1–7	New York Rangers	Moore	Series tied 1–1	L
3	April 20	1–5	@ New York Rangers	Stephenson	Rangers lead 2–1	L
4	April 22	0–6	@ New York Rangers	Moore	Rangers lead 3–1	L
5	April 24	3–8	New York Rangers	Stephenson	Rangers win 4–1	L

Legend: W Win L Loss

== Player statistics ==
=== Scoring ===
- Position abbreviations: C = Center; D = Defense; G = Goaltender; LW = Left wing; RW = Right wing
- † = Joined team via a transaction (e.g., trade, waivers, signing) during the season. Stats reflect time with the Flyers only.
- ‡ = Left team via a transaction (e.g., trade, waivers, release) during the season. Stats reflect time with the Flyers only.

No.	Player	Pos	Regular season						Playoffs					
No.	Player	Pos	GP	G	A	Pts	+/-	PIM	GP	G	A	Pts	+/-	PIM
7	Bill Barber	LW	79	34	46	80	19	22	8	3	4	7	−1	10
16	Bobby Clarke	C	80	16	57	73	12	68	8	2	4	6	−8	8
10	Mel Bridgman	C	76	24	35	59	14	184	8	1	2	3	−7	17
19	Rick MacLeish	LW	71	26	32	58	4	47	7	0	1	1	−5	0
27	Reggie Leach	RW	76	34	20	54	−3	20	8	5	1	6	−9	0
3	Behn Wilson	D	80	13	36	49	13	197	5	1	0	1	−6	8
32	Blake Dunlop	C	66	20	28	48	27	16	8	1	1	2	−5	4
2	Bob Dailey	D	70	9	30	39	21	63	8	1	2	3	0	14
9	Bob Kelly	LW	77	7	31	38	15	132	8	1	1	2	−5	10
17	Paul Holmgren	RW	57	19	10	29	2	168	8	1	5	6	6	22
26	Ken Linseman	C	30	5	20	25	16	23	8	2	6	8	1	22
20	Jimmy Watson	D	77	9	13	22	11	52	8	0	2	2	−5	2
5	Rick Lapointe	D	77	3	18	21	15	53	7	0	1	1	−4	14
22	Tom Gorence	RW	42	13	6	19	16	10	7	3	1	4	−5	0
29	Barry Dean	LW	30	4	13	17	−1	20	—	—	—	—	—	—
11	Don Saleski‡	RW	35	11	5	16	3	14	—	—	—	—	—	—
28 (Note: Ververgaert wore number 43 in his first game after being acquired.)	Dennis Ververgaert†	RW	37	9	7	16	−4	6	3	0	2	2	−1	2
37	Al Hill	LW	31	5	11	16	5	28	7	1	0	1	−2	2
8	Dave Hoyda	LW	67	3	13	16	2	138	3	0	0	0	0	0
6	Andre Dupont	D	77	3	9	12	21	135	8	0	0	0	−6	17
23	Paul Evans	C	44	6	5	11	−3	12	—	—	—	—	—	—
18	Yves Preston	LW	9	3	1	4	−2	0	—	—	—	—	—	—
31 (Note: Bathe wore number 38 in his first game.)	Frank Bathe	D	21	1	3	4	9	76	6	1	0	1	4	12
28	Drew Callander‡	C	15	2	1	3	−1	5	—	—	—	—	—	—
25	Kevin McCarthy‡	D	22	1	2	3	2	21	—	—	—	—	—	—
1	Bernie Parent	G	36	0	2	2		8	—	—	—	—	—	—
15	Danny Lucas	LW	6	1	0	1	−2	0	—	—	—	—	—	—
39	Robbie Moore†	G	5	0	1	1		0	5	0	1	1		2
35	Wayne Stephenson	G	40	0	1	1		2	4	0	0	0		5
44	Glen Cochrane	D	1	0	0	0	−2	0	—	—	—	—	—	—
24	Terry Murray	D	5	0	0	0	0	5	—	—	—	—	—	—
33	Pete Peeters	G	5	0	0	0		6	—	—	—	—	—	—
30	Rick St. Croix	G	2	0	0	0		0	—	—	—	—	—	—
25	Norm Barnes	D	—	—	—	—	—	—	2	0	0	0	−2	0

=== Goaltending ===
- † = Joined team via a transaction (e.g., trade, waivers, signing) during the season. Stats reflect time with the Flyers only.

No.	Player	Regular season											Playoffs									
No.	Player	GP	GS	W	L	T	SA	GA	GAA	SV%	SO	TOI	GP	GS	W	L	SA	GA	GAA	SV%	SO	TOI
35	Wayne Stephenson	40	36	20	10	5	946	122	3.36	.871	2	2,182	4	3	0	3	90	16	4.63	.822	0	208
1	Bernie Parent	36	36	16	12	7	834	89	2.71	.893	4	1,971	—	—	—	—	—	—	—	—	—	—
39	Robbie Moore†	5	3	3	0	1	96	7	1.77	.927	2	237	5	5	3	2	123	18	4.06	.854	0	266
33	Pete Peeters	5	4	1	2	1	109	16	3.47	.853	0	277	—	—	—	—	—	—	—	—	—	—
30	Rick St. Croix	2	1	0	1	1	53	6	3.08	.887	0	117	—	—	—	—	—	—	—	—	—	—

== Awards and records ==
=== Awards ===
Type	Award/honor	Recipient	Ref
League (annual)	NHL second All-Star team	Bill Barber (Left wing)	
League (in-season)	Challenge Cup selection	Bill Barber	
League (in-season)	Challenge Cup selection	Bobby Clarke	
Team	Barry Ashbee Trophy	Bob Dailey	
Team	Class Guy Award	Bernie Parent	

=== Records ===
Among the team records set during the 1978–79 season was Behn Wilson scoring 49 points, the most for a rookie defenseman in club history. On March 11, Frank Bathe received a club record 55 penalty minutes during a March 11 game against the Los Angeles Kings. During the fifth and final game of their quarterfinal playoff series loss to the New York Rangers, the Flyers six goals against during the third period is a team record. The five shorthanded goals they allowed during the series is also a single playoff series high.

The 1978–79 season was the final season of Bernie Parent's career, who hold several career records for the team. Parent holds the regular season marks for most ties (102), shutouts (50), and minutes played (28,215). He also holds the playoff marks for seasons played (7, tied with Ron Hextall), shutouts (6), and save percentage (.916).

=== Milestones ===
Milestone	Player	Date	Ref
First game	Paul Evans	October 12, 1978	
First game	Ken Linseman	October 12, 1978	
First game	Danny Lucas	October 12, 1978	
First game	Behn Wilson	October 12, 1978	
First game	Glen Cochrane	November 24, 1978	
First game	Yves Preston	December 14, 1978	
First game	Pete Peeters	December 17, 1978	
First game	Tom Gorence	January 4, 1979	
First game	Robbie Moore	March 6, 1979	

== Transactions ==
The Flyers were involved in the following transactions from May 26, 1978, the day after the deciding game of the 1978 Stanley Cup Final, through May 21, 1979, the day of the deciding game of the 1979 Stanley Cup Final.

=== Trades ===
Date	Details		Ref
June 2, 1978 (Note: The Flyers received the draft pick and cash as compensation for the Rangers hiring Shero as general manager and head coach.)	To Philadelphia Flyers: 1st-round pick in 1978; cash	To New York Rangers: Fred Shero	
June 14, 1978	To Philadelphia Flyers: 1st-round pick in 1978; Future considerations (Note: The Flyers later received the Penguins' 1978 8th-round pick.)	To Pittsburgh Penguins: Tom Bladon; Orest Kindrachuk; Ross Lonsberry	
June 15, 1978	To Philadelphia Flyers: 2nd-round pick in 1979	To Colorado Rockies: 2nd-round pick in 1978	
June 15, 1978	To Philadelphia Flyers: 10th-round pick in 1978; 11th-round pick in 1978	To Buffalo Sabres: cash	
June 15, 1978	To Philadelphia Flyers: 12th-round pick in 1978	To Chicago Black Hawks: cash	
August 31, 1978	To Philadelphia Flyers: cash	To Colorado Rockies: Joe Watson	
December 29, 1978	To Philadelphia Flyers: Dennis Ververgaert	To Vancouver Canucks: Drew Callander; Kevin McCarthy	
March 3, 1979	To Philadelphia Flyers: Future considerations	To Colorado Rockies: Don Saleski	

=== Players acquired ===
Date	Player	Former team	Via	Ref
September 1978	M. F. Schurman	Spokane Flyers (WIHL)	Free agency	
October 9, 1978	Yves Preston	Milwaukee Admirals (IHL)	Free agency	
November 7, 1978	Robbie Moore	University of Western Ontario (OUAA)	Free agency	
November 20, 1978	Reid Bailey	Port Huron Flags (IHL)	Free agency	

=== Players lost ===
Date	Player	New team	Via	Ref
July 19, 1978	Brian Burke		Retirement	
August 2, 1978	Mike Korney	St. Louis Blues	Free agency	

=== Signings ===
Date	Player	Term	Ref
July 13, 1978	Ken Linseman	3-year (Note: Contract included an option year.)	
July 13, 1978	Danny Lucas	3-year	
July 13, 1978	Behn Wilson	3-year	

== Draft picks ==
Philadelphia's picks at the 1978 NHL amateur draft, which was held at the Queen Elizabeth Hotel in Montreal, on June 15, 1978.

Round	Pick	Player	Position	Nationality	Team (league)	Notes
1	6	Behn Wilson	Defense	Canada	Kingston Canadians (OHA)	(Note: The Flyers acquired the 6th overall pick from the Pittsburgh Penguins along with future considerations (Penguins' eighth-round pick, 126th overall) for Tom Bladon, Ross Lonsberry and Orest Kindrachuk on June 14, 1978.)
1	7	Ken Linseman	Forward	Canada	Birmingham Bulls (WHA)	(Note: The Flyers received the 7th overall pick from the New York Rangers in exchange for the right to hire head coach Fred Shero on June 2, 1978.)
1	14	Dan Lucas	Wing	Canada	Sault Ste. Marie Greyhounds (OHA)	
2	33	Mike Simurda	Right wing	Canada	Kingston Canadians (OHA)	
3	37	Gord Salt	Right wing	Canada	Michigan Tech University (WCHA)	(Note: The Flyers traded Harvey Bennett to the Minnesota North Stars for Blake Dunlop and the North Stars' third-round pick, 37th overall, on October 28, 1977.)
3	50	Glen Cochrane	Defense	Canada	Victoria Cougars (WCHL)	
4	67	Russ Wilderman	Center	Canada	Seattle Breakers (WCHL)	
5	83	Brad Tamblyn	Defense	Canada	Toronto Marlboros (OHA)	
6	100	Mark Taylor	Forward	Canada	University of North Dakota (WCHA)	
7	117	Mike Ewanouski	Right wing	United States	Boston College (HE)	
8	126	Jerry Price	Goaltender	Canada	Portland Winter Hawks (WCHL)	
8	134	Darre Switzer	Left wing	Canada	Medicine Hat Tigers (WCHL)	
9	151	Greg Francis	Defense	Canada	St. Lawrence University (ECAC)	
10	167	Rick Berard	Defense	Canada	Saint Mary's University (CIAU)	(Note: The Flyers traded cash to the Buffalo Sabres for the Sabres' tenth and eleventh-round picks on June 15, 1978.)
10	168	Don Lucia	Defense	United States	University of Notre Dame (CCHA)	
11	182	Mike Berge	Forward	United States	University of North Dakota (WCHA)	
11	183	Ken Moore	Goaltender	United States	Clarkson University (ECAC)	
12	195	Jim Olson	Right wing	United States	St. Paul Vulcans (USHL)	(Note: The Flyers traded cash to the Chicago Black Hawks for the Black Hawks' twelfth-round pick, 195th overall, on June 15, 1978.)
12	198	Anton Šťastný	Forward	Czechoslovakia	Slovan ChZJD Bratislava (CFIHL)	(Note: Draft pick was ruled invalid after it was determined Stastny was too young to be drafted.)

== Farm teams ==
The Flyers were affiliated with the Maine Mariners of the AHL, the Milwaukee Admirals of the IHL, and the Jersey Aces of the NEHL.
