= 1980–81 Philadelphia Flyers season =

NHL hockey team season

1980–81 Philadelphia Flyers
- Division: 2nd Patrick
- Conference: 3rd Campbell
- 1980–81 record: 41–24–15
- Home record: 23–9–8
- Road record: 18–15–7
- Goals for: 313 (11th)
- Goals against: 249 (2nd)

Team information
- General manager: Keith Allen
- Coach: Pat Quinn
- Captain: Mel Bridgman
- Alternate captains: None (Note: The alternate captain position was abolished from the 1975–76 season through the 1984–85 season.)
- Arena: Spectrum
- Average attendance: 17,077
- Minor league affiliates: Maine Mariners; Toledo Goaldiggers

Team leaders
- Goals: Bill Barber (43)
- Assists: Behn Wilson (47)
- Points: Bill Barber (85)
- Penalty minutes: Paul Holmgren (306)
- Plus/minus: Terry Murray (+46)
- Wins: Pete Peeters (22)
- Goals against average: Rick St. Croix (2.50)

The 1980–81 Philadelphia Flyers season was the franchise's 14th season in the National Hockey League (NHL). After finishing second in the Patrick Division, the Flyers lost in the quarterfinals to the Calgary Flames in seven games.

== Regular season ==
Bobby Clarke wore the number 16 throughout his entire NHL career except for two games during the 1980–81 season. Prior to a road game on February 27, 1981, Clarke's jersey was stolen. Clarke wore the only other jersey available, number 36, in the next two games. A month later, Clarke hit a personal milestone in memorable fashion. On March 19 during a game against the Boston Bruins, a Reggie Leach slapshot struck Clarke. After leaving the ice, he re-appeared moments later stitched up and with his jersey covered in blood. 31 seconds into the third period Clarke beat Bruins goalie Marco Baron for his 19th goal of the season and his 1,000th career point.

=== Season standings ===
Patrick Division
	GP	W	L	T	GF	GA	Pts
**New York Islanders**	80	48	18	14	355	260	110
**Philadelphia Flyers**	80	41	24	15	313	249	97
**Calgary Flames**	80	39	27	14	329	298	92
**New York Rangers**	80	30	36	14	312	317	74
Washington Capitals	80	26	36	18	286	317	70

Note: GP = Games played, W = Wins, L = Losses, T = Ties, Pts = Points, GF = Goals for, GA = Goals against
Note: Teams that qualified for the playoffs are highlighted in bold.

League standings
R		Div	GP	W	L	T	GF	GA	Pts
1	**p – New York Islanders**	PTK	80	48	18	14	355	260	110
2	**x – St. Louis Blues**	SMY	80	45	18	17	352	281	107
3	**y – Montreal Canadiens**	NRS	80	45	22	13	332	232	103
4	**Los Angeles Kings**	NRS	80	43	24	13	337	290	99
5	**x – Buffalo Sabres**	ADM	80	39	20	21	327	250	99
6	**Philadelphia Flyers**	PTK	80	41	24	15	313	249	97
7	**Calgary Flames**	PTK	80	39	27	14	329	298	92
8	**Boston Bruins**	ADM	80	37	30	13	316	272	87
9	**Minnesota North Stars**	ADM	80	35	28	17	291	263	87
10	**Chicago Black Hawks**	SMY	80	31	33	16	304	315	78
11	**Quebec Nordiques**	ADM	80	30	32	18	314	318	78
12	**Vancouver Canucks**	SMY	80	28	32	20	289	301	76
13	**New York Rangers**	PTK	80	30	36	14	312	317	74
14	**Edmonton Oilers**	SMY	80	29	35	16	328	327	74
15	**Pittsburgh Penguins**	NRS	80	30	37	13	302	345	73
16	**Toronto Maple Leafs**	ADM	80	28	37	15	322	367	71
17	Washington Capitals	PTK	80	26	36	18	286	317	70
18	Hartford Whalers	NRS	80	21	41	18	292	372	60
19	Colorado Rockies	SMY	80	22	45	13	258	344	57
20	Detroit Red Wings	NRS	80	19	43	18	252	339	56
21	Winnipeg Jets	SMY	80	9	57	14	246	400	32

Divisions: ADM – Adams, NRS – Norris, PTK – Patrick, SMY – Smythe

bold – The top 16 teams in the league qualified for the playoffs, regardless of division or conference.
x – Won division; y – Won Conference (and division); p – Won Presidents' Trophy (and conference and division)

=== Record vs. opponents ===
Patrick Division record vs. opponents

==== Vs. Campbell Conference ====
**Vs. Patrick Division**

1980–81 NHL records
Team	**CGY**	**NYI**	**NYR**	**PHI**	**WSH**	**Total**
Calgary	—	1−1−2	2−1−1	2−2	3−1	**8−5−3**
N.Y. Islanders	1−1−2	—	2−2	1−2−1	4−0	**8−5−3**
N.Y. Rangers	1−2−1	2−2	—	1−1−2	2−2	**6−7−3**
Philadelphia	2−2	2−1−1	1−1−2	—	2−2	**7−6−3**
Washington	1−3	0−4	2−2	2−2	—	**5−11−0**

**Vs. Smythe Division**

1980–81 NHL records
Team	**CHI**	**COL**	**EDM**	**STL**	**VAN**	**WIN**	**Total**
Calgary	0−1−3	1−3	2−1−1	2−2	3−1	3−0−1	**11−8−5**
N.Y. Islanders	4−0	3−1	2−0−2	2−0−2	3−1	3−0−1	**17−2−5**
N.Y. Rangers	2−1−1	1−3	2−1−1	0−4	2−1−1	3−1	**10−11−3**
Philadelphia	1−1−2	4−0	2−2	3−0−1	1−2−1	3−1	**14−6−4**
Washington	1−1−2	3−0−1	2−1−1	0−2−2	1−1−2	3−0−1	**10−5−9**

**Vs. Wales Conference**

**Vs. Adams Division**

1980–81 NHL records
Team	**BOS**	**BUF**	**MIN**	**QUE**	**TOR**	**Total**
Calgary	3−1	1−2−1	2−2	1−1−2	2−2	**9−8−3**
N.Y. Islanders	2−2	2−2	2−0−2	3−1	3−1	**12−6−2**
N.Y. Rangers	2−2	1−2−1	1−1−2	1−1−2	2−2	**7−8−5**
Philadelphia	2−2	0−2−2	2−1−1	1−2−1	0−2−2	**5−9−6**
Washington	1−2−1	0−2−2	0−3−1	0−4	3−1	**4−12−4**

**Vs. Norris Division**

1980–81 NHL records
Team	**DET**	**HFD**	**LAK**	**MTL**	**PIT**	**Total**
Calgary	2−1−1	3−1	3−1	1−2−1	2−1−1	**11−6−3**
N.Y. Islanders	4−0	2−0−2	2−2	2−1−1	1−2−1	**11−5−4**
N.Y. Rangers	1−2−1	3−1	1−3	1−2−1	1−2−1	**7−10−3**
Philadelphia	3−1	3−0−1	4−0	1−2−1	4−0	**15−3−2**
Washington	2−1−1	3−1	1−2−1	0−2−2	1−2−1	**7−8−5**

== Playoffs ==
After a tough, five-game preliminary round series win against the Quebec Nordiques, the Flyers moved on to face the Calgary Flames in the quarterfinals. After falling behind 3 games to 1, they managed to force a game seven by winning the next two games. The Flyers lost game seven, 4–1, at the Spectrum.

== Schedule and results ==
=== Regular season ===
1980–81 regular season
October: 7–3–1, 15 points (home: 5–2–1; road: 2–1–0)

Game	Date	Score	Opponent	Decision	Record	Points	Recap
1	October 9	7–4	Pittsburgh Penguins	Myre	1–0–0	2	W
2	October 11	5–1	@ St. Louis Blues	Peeters	2–0–0	4	W
3	October 12	2–4	Toronto Maple Leafs	Myre	2–1–0	4	L
4	October 16	2–5	Vancouver Canucks	Peeters	2–2–0	4	L
5	October 18	2–6	@ Toronto Maple Leafs	Myre	2–3–0	4	L
6	October 19	2–1	Montreal Canadiens	Peeters	3–3–0	6	W
7	October 23	4–2	New York Islanders	Peeters	4–3–0	8	W
8	October 25	3–1	@ New York Islanders	Peeters	5–3–0	10	W
9	October 26	6–1	Hartford Whalers	St. Croix	6–3–0	12	W
10	October 28	8–0	Calgary Flames	Peeters	7–3–0	14	W
11	October 30	3–3	New York Rangers	Myre	7–3–1	15	T

November: 10–2–3, 23 points (home: 6–0–1; road: 4–2–2)

Game	Date	Score	Opponent	Decision	Record	Points	Recap
12	November 1	3–3	@ Quebec Nordiques	St. Croix	7–3–2	16	T
13	November 2	4–2	Boston Bruins	Peeters	8–3–2	18	W
14	November 6	8–2	Los Angeles Kings	Peeters	9–3–2	20	W
15	November 8	5–4	@ Hartford Whalers	Myre	10–3–2	22	W
16	November 9	3–1	Quebec Nordiques	Peeters	11–3–2	24	W
17	November 13	8–1	Edmonton Oilers	St. Croix	12–3–2	26	W
18	November 15	5–2	Detroit Red Wings	Peeters	13–3–2	28	W
19	November 16	0–1	@ Boston Bruins	Myre	13–4–2	28	L
20	November 19	5–1	@ New York Rangers	St. Croix	14–4–2	30	W
21	November 20	1–1	Minnesota North Stars	Myre	14–4–3	31	T
22	November 22	3–7	@ Montreal Canadiens	Peeters	14–5–3	31	L
23	November 23	3–1	Winnipeg Jets	Peeters	15–5–3	33	W
24	November 26	4–2	@ Los Angeles Kings	St. Croix	16–5–3	35	W
25	November 28	7–4	@ Colorado Rockies	Myre	17–5–3	37	W
26	November 29	3–3	@ Vancouver Canucks	Peeters	17–5–4	38	T

December: 7–4–1, 15 points (home: 4–1–0; road: 3–3–1)

Game	Date	Score	Opponent	Decision	Record	Points	Recap
27	December 4	7–5	Chicago Black Hawks	Peeters	18–5–4	40	W
28	December 6	2–4	@ Detroit Red Wings	St. Croix	18–6–4	40	L
29	December 7	4–2	Colorado Rockies	Myre	19–6–4	42	W
30	December 10	2–2	@ Chicago Black Hawks	Peeters	19–6–5	43	T
31	December 13	6–5	@ Pittsburgh Penguins	Myre	20–6–5	45	W
32	December 14	5–4	St. Louis Blues	St. Croix	21–6–5	47	W
33	December 18	2–0	Colorado Rockies	St. Croix	22–6–5	49	W
34	December 20	5–2	@ Washington Capitals	Peeters	23–6–5	51	W
35	December 21	0–6	Washington Capitals	Myre	23–7–5	51	L
36	December 27	1–2	@ Calgary Flames	St. Croix	23–8–5	51	L
37	December 28	2–1	@ Edmonton Oilers	Peeters	24–8–5	53	W
38	December 30	5–6	@ Minnesota North Stars	Myre	24–9–5	53	L

January: 6–5–3, 15 points (home: 2–2–1; road: 4–3–2)

Game	Date	Score	Opponent	Decision	Record	Points	Recap
39	January 2	3–4	@ Winnipeg Jets	St. Croix	24–10–5	53	L
40	January 4	8–1	@ Washington Capitals	Peeters	25–10–5	55	W
41	January 8	5–5	St. Louis Blues	Myre	25–10–6	56	T
42	January 10	4–4	@ Toronto Maple Leafs	St. Croix	25–10–7	57	T
43	January 11	2–4	New York Islanders	Peeters	25–11–7	57	L
44	January 15	1–4	Quebec Nordiques	Peeters	25–12–7	57	L
45	January 17	4–6	@ Boston Bruins	Peeters	25–13–7	57	L
46	January 18	7–2	Los Angeles Kings	Peeters	26–13–7	59	W
47	January 21	5–0	@ Pittsburgh Penguins	Peeters	27–13–7	61	W
48	January 22	5–4	Minnesota North Stars	Peeters	28–13–7	63	W
49	January 24	3–6	@ Montreal Canadiens	Peeters	28–14–7	63	L
50	January 28	4–4	@ Buffalo Sabres	St. Croix	28–14–8	64	T
51	January 30	7–4	@ Colorado Rockies	Myre	29–14–8	66	W
52	January 31	3–2	@ St. Louis Blues	St. Croix	30–14–8	68	W

February: 6–5–2, 14 points (home: 2–1–2; road: 4–4–0)

Game	Date	Score	Opponent	Decision	Record	Points	Recap
53	February 5	0–4	Buffalo Sabres	Peeters	30–15–8	68	L
54	February 7	3–5	@ Quebec Nordiques	St. Croix	30–16–8	68	L
55	February 8	6–6	Hartford Whalers	Myre	30–16–9	69	T
56	February 12	4–3	Vancouver Canucks	Peeters	31–16–9	71	W
57	February 14	3–1	@ Detroit Red Wings	St. Croix	32–16–9	73	W
58	February 15	5–5	Montreal Canadiens	Peeters	32–16–10	74	T
59	February 17	4–1	Pittsburgh Penguins	St. Croix	33–16–10	76	W
60	February 19	4–5	@ Calgary Flames	Peeters	33–17–10	76	L
61	February 21	3–1	@ Los Angeles Kings	St. Croix	34–17–10	78	W
62	February 24	4–6	@ Vancouver Canucks	St. Croix	34–18–10	78	L
63	February 25	2–6	@ Edmonton Oilers	Peeters	34–19–10	78	L
64	February 27	6–3	@ Winnipeg Jets	Peeters	35–19–10	80	W
65	February 28	4–2	@ Minnesota North Stars	St. Croix	36–19–10	82	W

March: 5–4–4, 14 points (home: 4–2–2; road: 1–2–2)

Game	Date	Score	Opponent	Decision	Record	Points	Recap
66	March 5	10–1	Winnipeg Jets	Peeters	37–19–10	84	W
67	March 7	3–5	Edmonton Oilers	St. Croix	37–20–10	84	L
68	March 8	4–8	@ Buffalo Sabres	Peeters	37–21–10	84	L
69	March 12	9–4	Detroit Red Wings	Peeters	38–21–10	86	W
70	March 14	3–3	@ New York Islanders	St. Croix	38–21–11	87	T
71	March 15	4–4	Toronto Maple Leafs	Peeters	38–21–12	88	T
72	March 18	1–5	@ Chicago Black Hawks	St. Croix	38–22–12	88	L
73	March 19	5–3	Boston Bruins	Peeters	39–22–12	90	W
74	March 21	4–4	Chicago Black Hawks	Peeters	39–22–13	91	T
75	March 22	6–2	Calgary Flames	St. Croix	40–22–13	93	W
76	March 24	2–5	Washington Capitals	Peeters	40–23–13	93	L
77	March 29	4–1	@ Hartford Whalers	St. Croix	41–23–13	95	W
78	March 30	0–0	@ New York Rangers	St. Croix	41–23–14	96	T

April: 0–1–1, 1 points (home: 0–1–1; road: 0–0–0)

Game	Date	Score	Opponent	Decision	Record	Points	Recap
79	April 2	2–2	Buffalo Sabres	St. Croix	41–23–15	97	T
80	April 5	0–2	New York Rangers	Peeters	41–24–15	97	L

Legend: W Win (2 points) L Loss (0 points) T Tie (1 point)

=== Playoffs ===
1981 Stanley Cup playoffs
Preliminary Round vs. Quebec Nordiques - Flyers win 3–2

Game	Date	Score	Opponent	Decision	Series	Recap
1	April 8	6–4	Quebec Nordiques	St. Croix	Flyers lead 1–0	W
2	April 9	8–5	Quebec Nordiques	Peeters	Flyers lead 2–0	W
3	April 11	0–2	@ Quebec Nordiques	St. Croix	Flyers lead 2–1	L
4	April 12	3–4 OT	@ Quebec Nordiques	St. Croix	Series tied 2–2	L
5	April 14	5–2	Quebec Nordiques	Peeters	Flyers win 3–2	W

Quarterfinals vs. Calgary Flames – Flames win 4–3

Game	Date	Score	Opponent	Decision	Series	Recap
1	April 16	4–0	Calgary Flames	St. Croix	Flyers lead 1–0	W
2	April 17	4–5	Calgary Flames	Peeters	Series tied 1–1	L
3	April 19	1–2	@ Calgary Flames	St. Croix	Flames lead 2–1	L
4	April 20	4–5	@ Calgary Flames	St. Croix	Flames lead 3–1	L
5	April 22	9–4	Calgary Flames	St. Croix	Flames lead 3–2	W
6	April 24	3–2	@ Calgary Flames	St. Croix	Series tied 3–3	W
7	April 26	1–4	Calgary Flames	St. Croix	Flames win 4–3	L

Legend: W Win L Loss

== Player statistics ==
=== Scoring ===
- Position abbreviations: C = Center; D = Defense; G = Goaltender; LW = Left wing; RW = Right wing
- † = Joined team via a transaction (e.g., trade, waivers, signing) during the season. Stats reflect time with the Flyers only.
- ‡ = Left team via a transaction (e.g., trade, waivers, release) during the season. Stats reflect time with the Flyers only.

No.	Player	Pos	Regular season						Playoffs					
No.	Player	Pos	GP	G	A	Pts	+/-	PIM	GP	G	A	Pts	+/-	PIM
7	Bill Barber	LW	80	43	42	85	6	69	12	11	5	16	7	0
19	Rick MacLeish	LW	78	38	36	74	22	25	12	5	5	10	−1	0
27	Reggie Leach	RW	79	34	36	70	21	59	9	0	0	0	1	2
26	Brian Propp	LW	79	26	40	66	27	110	12	6	6	12	6	32
16 (Note: Clarke was forced to wear number 36 in two road games in late February due to his jersey being stolen.)	Bobby Clarke	C	80	19	46	65	17	140	12	3	3	6	3	6
3	Behn Wilson	D	77	16	47	63	39	237	12	2	10	12	7	36
17	Paul Holmgren	RW	77	22	37	59	12	306	12	5	9	14	6	49
10	Mel Bridgman	C	77	14	37	51	28	195	12	2	4	6	−1	39
14	Ken Linseman	C	51	17	30	47	9	150	12	4	16	20	10	67
12	Tim Kerr	C/RW	68	22	23	45	3	84	10	1	3	4	2	2
22	Tom Gorence	RW	79	24	18	42	17	46	12	3	2	5	2	29
2	Bob Dailey	D	53	7	27	34	8	141	7	0	1	1	0	18
15	Al Hill	LW	57	10	15	25	11	45	12	2	4	6	−1	18
24	Terry Murray	D	71	1	17	18	46	53	12	2	1	3	4	10
21	Gary Morrison	RW	33	1	13	14	10	68	—	—	—	—	—	—
8	Thomas Eriksson	D	24	1	10	11	4	14	7	0	2	2	1	6
11	Ron Flockhart	C	14	3	7	10	6	11	3	1	0	1	0	2
6	Blake Wesley	D	50	3	7	10	13	107	—	—	—	—	—	—
29 (Note: Cochrane wore number 9 in his first game and number 35 in his following eight games.)	Glen Cochrane	D	31	1	8	9	3	219	6	1	1	2	6	18
18	Yves Preston	LW	19	4	2	6	1	4	—	—	—	—	—	—
28	Mike Busniuk	D	72	1	5	6	27	204	6	0	1	1	5	11
20	Jimmy Watson	D	18	2	2	4	14	6	—	—	—	—	—	—
9 (Note: Bailey wore number 35 in three of his first five games and number 36 in the other two games.)	Reid Bailey	D	17	1	3	4	8	55	12	0	2	2	0	23
25 (Note: Adams wore number 36 in his first five games.)	Greg Adams	LW	6	3	0	3	0	8	—	—	—	—	—	—
25	Norm Barnes‡	D	22	0	3	3	−3	18	—	—	—	—	—	—
5	Frank Bathe	D	44	0	3	3	−3	175	12	0	3	3	−2	16
33	Pete Peeters	G	40	0	1	1		8	3	0	0	0		19
30	Rick St. Croix	G	27	0	1	1		0	9	0	0	0		2
23	Paul Evans	C	1	0	0	0	0	2	—	—	—	—	—	—
29	Jack McIlhargey‡	D	3	0	0	0	2	22	—	—	—	—	—	—
31	Phil Myre‡	G	16	0	0	0		0	—	—	—	—	—	—

=== Goaltending ===
- † = Joined team via a transaction (e.g., trade, waivers, signing) during the season. Stats reflect time with the Flyers only.
- ‡ = Left team via a transaction (e.g., trade, waivers, release) during the season. Stats reflect time with the Flyers only.

No.	Player	Regular season											Playoffs									
No.	Player	GP	GS	W	L	T	SA	GA	GAA	SV%	SO	TOI	GP	GS	W	L	SA	GA	GAA	SV%	SO	TOI
33	Pete Peeters	40	39	22	15	5	1115	115	2.97	.897	2	2,324	3	3	2	1	65	12	4.03	.815	0	179
30	Rick St. Croix	27	26	13	7	6	746	65	2.50	.913	2	1,563	9	9	4	5	250	27	3.01	.892	1	537
31	Phil Myre‡	16	15	6	5	4	450	61	4.08	.864	0	898	—	—	—	—	—	—	—	—	—	—

== Awards and records ==
=== Awards ===
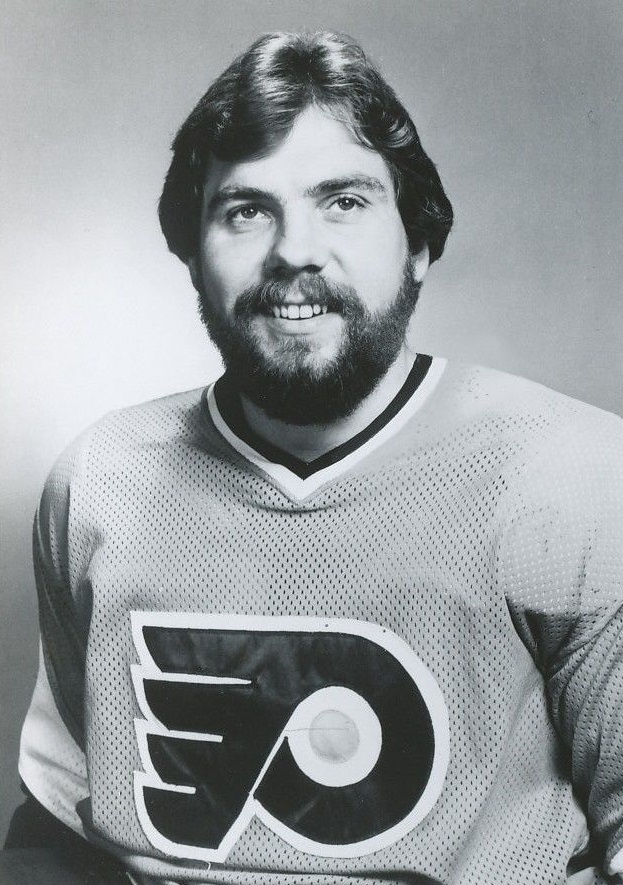
Bob Dailey participated in the All Star Game and won the Barry Ashbee Trophy as the Flyers top defenseman during the 1980–81 season.

Type	Award/honor	Recipient	Ref
League (annual)	NHL second All-Star team	Bill Barber (Left wing)	
League (in-season)	NHL All-Star Game selection	Bill Barber	
League (in-season)	NHL All-Star Game selection	Bob Dailey	
League (in-season)	NHL All-Star Game selection	Paul Holmgren	
League (in-season)	NHL All-Star Game selection	Pete Peeters	
League (in-season)	NHL All-Star Game selection	Pat Quinn (Coach)	
League (in-season)	NHL All-Star Game selection	Behn Wilson	
Team	Barry Ashbee Trophy	Bob Dailey	
Team	Class Guy Award	Bill Barber	

=== Records ===
Among the team records set during the 1980–81 season was Bobby Clarke tying the team record for goals in a single period (3) on December 13. The team's 2,621 penalty minutes during the regular season is a franchise record. During their preliminary round series against the Quebec Nordiques, the two shorthanded goals scored during game two tied a team record. Seven seconds into game four Terry Murray scored the fastest goal from the start of a playoff game in team history.

A number of team records were set or tied during game four of their quarterfinal series against the Calgary Flames, most notably setting a team record for most goals during a playoff game (9). Their five goals during the first period (5) is also tied for the team record. Ken Linseman tied team records for most assists in a playoff game (4) and period (3). Their 9–4 victory in the game ended a team record seven game playoff road losing streak dating back to May 17, 1980.

=== Milestones ===
Milestone	Player	Date	Ref
First game	Tim Kerr	October 9, 1980	
First game	Ron Flockhart	November 2, 1980	
First game	Greg Adams	January 17, 1981	
First game	Thomas Eriksson	February 12, 1981	
First game	Reid Bailey	February 27, 1981	
1000th point	Bobby Clarke	March 19, 1981	

== Transactions ==
The Flyers were involved in the following transactions from May 25, 1980, the day after the deciding game of the 1980 Stanley Cup Final, through May 21, 1981, the day of the deciding game of the 1981 Stanley Cup Final.

=== Trades ===
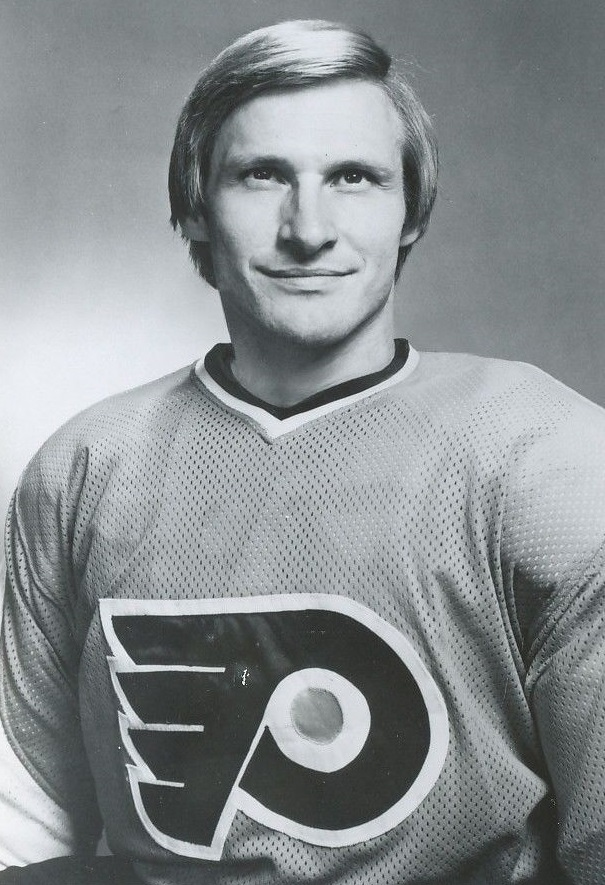
Phil Myre was traded to Colorado on February 26, 1981.

Date	Details		Ref
June 11, 1980	To Philadelphia Flyers: Ron Areshenkoff; 10th-round pick in 1980	To Edmonton Oilers: Barry Dean	
August 11, 1980	To Philadelphia Flyers: cash	To Quebec Nordiques: John Paddock	
August 21, 1980	To Philadelphia Flyers: 3rd-round pick in 1982	To Washington Capitals: Bob Kelly	
September 15, 1980	To Philadelphia Flyers: 7th-round pick in 1981; cash	To Quebec Nordiques: Andre Dupont	
November 21, 1980	To Philadelphia Flyers: 2nd-round pick in 1982	To Hartford Whalers: Norm Barnes; Jack McIlhargey	
January 6, 1981	To Philadelphia Flyers	To Wichita Wind (CHL): Loan of Yves Preston	
February 26, 1981	To Philadelphia Flyers: cash	To Colorado Rockies: Phil Myre	

=== Players acquired ===
Date	Player	Former team	Via	Ref
July 2, 1980	Ron Flockhart	Regina Pats (WCHL)	Free agency	
February 17, 1981	Ilkka Sinisalo	HIFK (Liiga)	Free agency (Note: Contract begins with 1981–82 season)	
March 6, 1981	Dave Logan	Vancouver Canucks	Free agency	

=== Players lost ===
Date	Player	New team	Via	Ref
N/A	Dave Gardner	HC Ambri-Piotta (NLB)	Free agency	
October 6, 1980	Dennis Ververgaert	Washington Capitals	Free agency	
October 1980	Danny Lucas	Colorado Rockies (Note: Lucas signed with Colorado later in October 1980.)	Buyout	

=== Signings ===
Date	Player	Term	Ref
May 28, 1980	Thomas Eriksson	3-year	
May 28, 1980	Pelle Lindbergh	3-year	
June 6, 1980	Mark Taylor		

== Draft picks ==
Philadelphia's picks at the 1980 NHL entry draft, which was held at the Montreal Forum in Montreal, on June 11, 1980.

Round	Pick	Player	Position	Nationality	Team (league)	Notes
1	21	Mike Stothers	Defense	Canada	Kingston Canadians (OHA)	
2	42	Jay Fraser	Left wing	Canada	Ottawa 67's (OHA)	
3	63	Paul Mercier	Defense	Canada	Sudbury Wolves (OHA)	
4	84	Taras Zytynsky	Defense	Canada	Montreal Juniors (QMJHL)	
5	105	Dan Held	Forward	Canada	Seattle Breakers (WHL)	
6	126	Brian Tutt	Defense	Canada	Calgary Wranglers (WHL)	
7	147	Ross Fitzpatrick	Forward	Canada	Western Michigan University (CCHA)	
8	168	Mark Botell	Defense	Canada	Brantford Alexanders (OHA)	
9	189	Peter Dineen	Defense	Canada	Kingston Canadians (OHA)	
10	195	Bob O'Brien	Right wing	Canada	Dixie Beehives (OPJHL)	(Note: The Flyers traded Barry Dean to the Edmonton Oilers for Ron Areshenkoff and the Oilers' tenth-round pick, 195th overall, on June 11, 1980.)
10	210	Andy Brickley	Left wing	United States	University of New Hampshire (HE)	

== Farm teams ==
The Flyers were affiliated with the Maine Mariners of the AHL and the Toledo Goaldiggers of the IHL.
