= M. F. Schurman =

Canadian ice hockey player

- Born: July 18, 1957 (age 68) Summerside, Prince Edward Island, Canada
- Height: 6 ft 3 in (191 cm)
- Weight: 205 lb (93 kg; 14 st 9 lb)
- Position: Left wing
- Shot: Left
- Played for: Hartford Whalers
- NHL draft: Undrafted
- Playing career: 1978–1984

Maynard Freeman Schurman (born July 18, 1957) is a Canadian former professional ice hockey player. He played left wing in seven National Hockey League (NHL) games with the Hartford Whalers during the 1979–80 season.

Schurman was born in Summerside, Prince Edward Island. Schurman currently owns and operates the Crystal Sports Pro Shop, located in the Fred Rust Ice Arena at the University of Delaware.

== Career statistics ==
=== Regular season and playoffs ===
			Regular season					Playoffs
Season	Team	League	GP	G	A	Pts	PIM	GP	G	A	Pts	PIM
1975–76	Mount Allison University	CIAU	20	3	1	4	4	—	—	—	—	—
1976–77	Mount Allison University	CIAU	20	14	13	27	23	—	—	—	—	—
1977–78	Spokane Flyers	WIHL	56	20	42	62	113	—	—	—	—	—
1978–79	Maine Mariners	AHL	10	0	0	0	15	—	—	—	—	—
1978–79	Milwaukee Admirals	IHL	61	23	30	53	83	8	3	2	5	0
1979–80	Springfield Indians	AHL	64	5	15	20	24	—	—	—	—	—
1979–80	Hartford Whalers	NHL	7	0	0	0	0	—	—	—	—	—
1980–81	Hampton Aces	EHL	66	13	43	56	49	—	—	—	—	—
1981–82	Charlottetown Islanders	NBSHL	—	—	—	—	—	—	—	—	—	—
1982–83	Wichita Wind	CHL	38	14	19	33	24	—	—	—	—	—
1983–84	Maine Mariners	AHL	43	5	15	20	50	—	—	—	—	—
AHL totals			117	10	30	40	89	—	—	—	—	—
NHL totals			7	0	0	0	0	—	—	—	—	—
