= Rollie Boutin =

Canadian ice hockey player (born 1957)

- Born: November 6, 1957 (age 68) Westlock, Alberta, Canada
- Height: 5 ft 10 in (178 cm)
- Weight: 188 lb (85 kg; 13 st 6 lb)
- Position: Goaltender
- Caught: Left
- Played for: Washington Capitals
- NHL draft: 111st overall, 1977; Washington Capitals
- Playing career: 1977–1984

Roland David Boutin (born November 6, 1957) is a Canadian former ice hockey goaltender. He played 22 games in the National Hockey League for the Washington Capitals from 1978 to 1981. The rest of his career, which lasted from 1977 to 1984, was spent in the minor leagues. He was selected by the Capitals in the 1977 NHL entry draft.

== Career ==
Boutin was born in Westlock, Alberta and raised in Dapp, Alberta. He played junior hockey for the Lethbridge Broncos, Prince Albert Raiders and Swift Current Broncos from 1973 until 1977.

Boutin turned professional with the Port Huron Flags in 1977–78. From there, Boutin played with several minor league teams with several call-ups to the Washington Capitals in 1978–79, 1979–80 and 1980–81. Boutin's last season was 1983–84, with the Binghamton Whalers.

== Career statistics ==
=== Regular season and playoffs ===
			Regular season									Playoffs
Season	Team	League	GP	W	L	T	MIN	GA	SO	GAA	SV%	GP	W	L	MIN	GA	SO	GAA	SV%
1973–74	Prince Albert Raiders	SJHL	32	—	—	—	1920	1199	1	3.89	—	—	—	—	—	—	—	—	—
1973–74	Swift Current Broncos	WCHL	1	1	0	0	60	3	0	3.00	.919	—	—	—	—	—	—	—	—
1974–75	Lethbridge Broncos	WCHL	39	—	—	—	2196	162	1	4.43	.870	3	0	3	180	11	0	3.49	—
1975–76	Lethbridge Broncos	WCHL	61	—	—	—	3430	259	0	4.53	.866	7	—	—	420	37	0	5.29	—
1976–77	Lethbridge Broncos	WCHL	59	—	—	—	3296	246	1	4.45	.880	15	—	—	855	63	0	4.42	.880
1977–78	Port Huron Flags	IHL	58	—	—	—	3192	205	1	3.85	—	17	11	6	1002	68	0	4.07	—
1978–79	Washington Capitals	NHL	2	0	1	0	90	10	0	6.67	.811	—	—	—	—	—	—	—	—
1978–79	Hershey Bears	AHL	30	13	8	5	1624	105	0	3.88	.880	4	1	3	240	16	0	4.00	—
1978–79	Port Huron Flags	IHL	9	—	—	—	464	24	0	3.10	.899	3	1	1	138	9	0	3.91	—
1979–80	Washington Capitals	NHL	18	7	7	1	926	54	0	3.50	.881	—	—	—	—	—	—	—	—
1979–80	Hershey Bears	AHL	15	11	2	0	821	34	0	2.48	.904	—	—	—	—	—	—	—	—
1980–81	Washington Capitals	NHL	2	0	2	0	120	11	0	5.51	.853	—	—	—	—	—	—	—	—
1980–81	Hershey Bears	AHL	53	32	15	5	3056	182	3	3.57	.877	7	5	2	420	20	1	2.88	—
1981–82	Hershey Bears	AHL	62	27	27	4	3459	238	1	4.13	—	3	0	2	107	13	0	7.30	—
1982–83	Birmingham South Stars	CHL	11	1	8	1	619	48	0	4.65	.858	—	—	—	—	—	—	—	—
1982–83	Salt Lake Golden Eagles	CHL	14	8	4	1	807	43	1	3.20	.891	5	2	2	251	21	0	5.02	—
1983–84	Binghamton Whalers	AHL	45	23	20	1	2623	188	3	4.30	.861	—	—	—	—	—	—	—	—
NHL totals			22	7	10	1	1136	75	0	3.96	.871	—	—	—	—	—	—	—	—
