= Yves Preston =

Canadian ice hockey player

- Born: June 14, 1956 (age 68); Montreal, Quebec, Canada
- Height: 5 ft 11 in (180 cm)
- Weight: 180 lb (82 kg; 12 st 12 lb)
- Position: Left wing
- Shot: Left
- Played for: Philadelphia Flyers
- NHL draft: Undrafted
- Playing career: 1976–1984

Yves Preston (born June 14, 1956) is a Canadian former professional ice hockey player. He played 28 games in the National Hockey League (NHL) with the Philadelphia Flyers during the 1978–79 and 1980–81 seasons. The rest of his career, which lasted from 1976 to 1984, was spent in the minor leagues. He later coached high school ice hockey at the University School of Milwaukee, where he served as the boys' varsity defensive coach.

== Career statistics ==
| | | | Regular season | | | | | Playoffs |
| Season | Team | League | GP | G | A | Pts | PIM | GP | G | A | Pts | PIM |
|---|---|---|---|---|---|---|---|---|---|---|---|---|
| 1973–74 | Chicoutimi Saguenéens | QMJHL | 70 | 26 | 33 | 59 | 30 | — | — | — | — | — |
| 1974–75 | Laval National | QMJHL | 64 | 18 | 33 | 51 | 44 | 15 | 4 | 10 | 14 | 32 |
| 1975–76 | Laval National | QMJHL | 63 | 29 | 42 | 71 | 45 | — | — | — | — | — |
| 1976–77 | Beauce Jaros | NAHL | 20 | 5 | 5 | 10 | 22 | — | — | — | — | — |
| 1976–77 | Maine Nordiques | NAHL | 7 | 3 | 2 | 5 | 2 | — | — | — | — | — |
| 1976–77 | Dayton Gems | IHL | 10 | 0 | 0 | 0 | 2 | — | — | — | — | — |
| 1976–77 | Milwaukee Admirals | USHL | 15 | 17 | 13 | 30 | 2 | 10 | 6 | 5 | 11 | 15 |
| 1977–78 | Milwaukee Admirals | IHL | 80 | 37 | 37 | 74 | 51 | 1 | 0 | 0 | 0 | 0 |
| 1978–79 | Philadelphia Flyers | NHL | 9 | 3 | 1 | 4 | 0 | — | — | — | — | — |
| 1978–79 | Maine Mariners | AHL | 73 | 35 | 32 | 67 | 38 | 10 | 6 | 4 | 10 | 19 |
| 1979–80 | Maine Mariners | AHL | 71 | 23 | 24 | 47 | 51 | 12 | 1 | 4 | 5 | 17 |
| 1980–81 | Philadelphia Flyers | NHL | 19 | 4 | 2 | 6 | 4 | — | — | — | — | — |
| 1980–81 | Wichita Wind | CHL | 31 | 4 | 11 | 15 | 25 | 4 | 0 | 3 | 3 | 21 |
| 1981–82 | Milwaukee Admirals | IHL | 70 | 25 | 29 | 54 | 23 | 5 | 1 | 1 | 2 | 0 |
| 1982–83 | Milwaukee Admirals | IHL | 67 | 35 | 53 | 88 | 17 | 11 | 4 | 3 | 7 | 6 |
| 1983–84 | Milwaukee Admirals | IHL | 82 | 36 | 49 | 85 | 37 | 4 | 0 | 2 | 2 | 0 |
| NHL totals | | | 28 | 7 | 3 | 10 | 4 | — | — | — | — | — |
