= List of Philadelphia Flyers seasons =

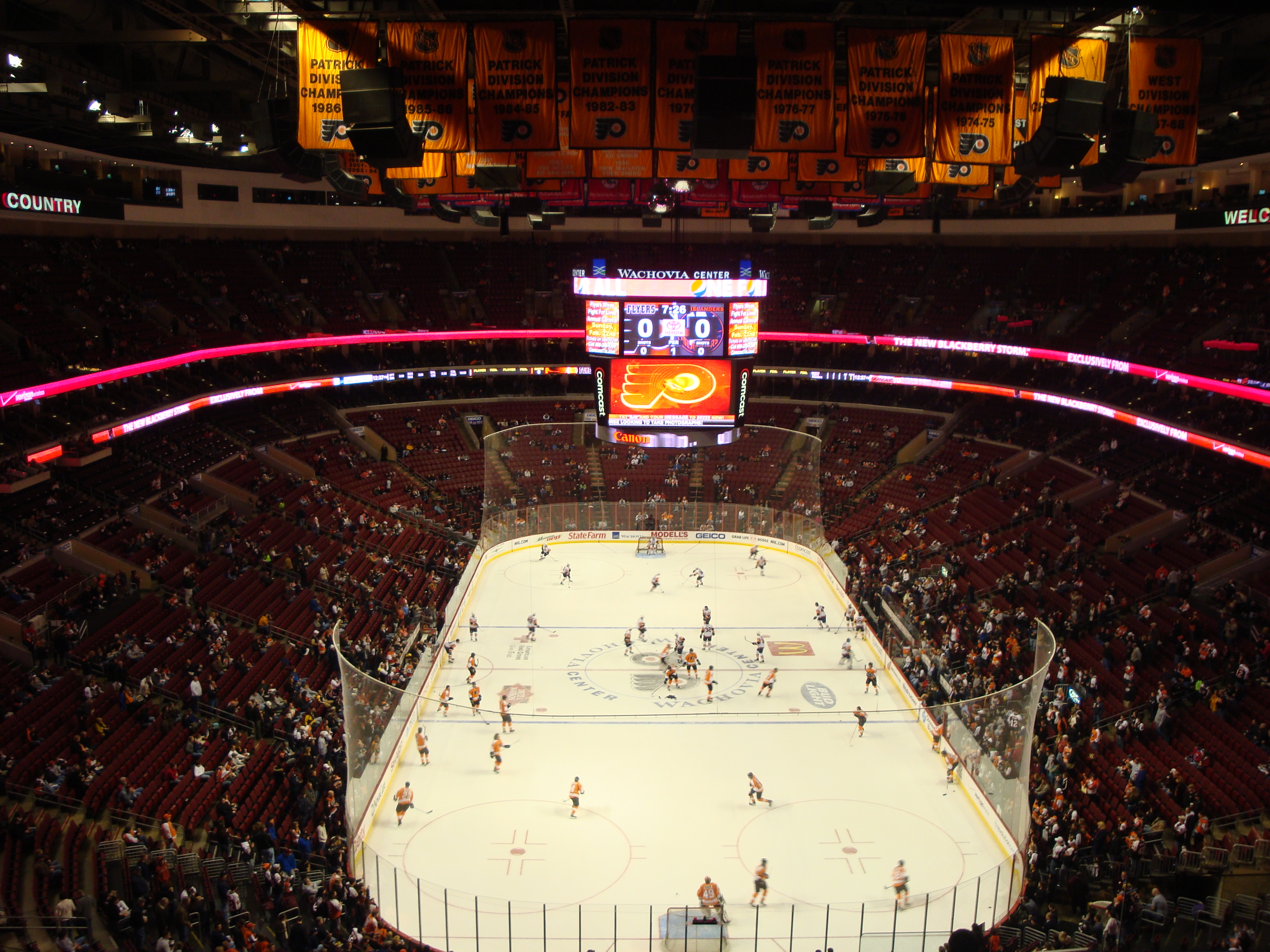
The Xfinity Mobile Arena prior to a game. Banners representing the Flyers' first eight division titles are visible at the top.

The Philadelphia Flyers are a professional ice hockey team based in Philadelphia. They compete in the National Hockey League (NHL) Eastern Conference's Metropolitan Division. Since their inaugural season in 1967, the team has played its home games on Broad Street in South Philadelphia, first at the Spectrum from 1967 to 1996 and then at the Xfinity Mobile Arena since 1996. In 58 completed seasons (excluding the 2004–05 season that was canceled due to lockout), the team has won the Stanley Cup as NHL champions twice and has qualified for the playoffs 41 times. They have played more than 400 playoff games, winning 235. As of the end of the 2025–26 season, Philadelphia has won more than 2,000 regular season games, the seventh-highest victory total among NHL teams and the most among non-Original Six teams. The Flyers also possess an all-time .567 points percentage, the fourth-highest among NHL teams.

The Flyers were founded in 1967 and won consecutive Stanley Cup championships in 1974 and 1975, the first expansion team to do so. The team has since lost in six return trips to the Stanley Cup Final in 1976, 1980, 1985, 1987, 1997 and 2010. The Flyers have never won the Presidents' Trophy, although they led the NHL in regular season points in 1974–75, 1979–80 and 1984–85, before the league began awarding the trophy.

== Table key ==
Key of colors and symbols
Color/symbol	Explanation
†	Stanley Cup champions
‡	Conference champions
↑	Division champions
#	Led league in points

Key of terms and abbreviations
Term or abbreviation	Definition
Finish	Final position in division or league standings
GP	Number of games played
W	Number of wins
L	Number of losses
T	Number of ties
OT	Number of losses in overtime (since the 1999–2000 season)
Pts	Number of points
GF	Goals for (goals scored by the Flyers)
GA	Goals against (goals scored by the Flyers' opponents)
—	Does not apply

== Year by year ==
Year by year listing of all seasons played by the Philadelphia Flyers
NHL season	Flyers season	Conference	Division	Regular season									Postseason					
NHL season	Flyers season	Conference	Division	Finish	GP	W	L	T	OT	Pts	GF	GA	GP	W	L	GF	GA	Result
1967–68	1967–68	—	West↑	1st	74	31	32	11	—	73	173	179	7	3	4	17	17	Lost quarterfinals to St. Louis Blues, 3–4
1968–69	1968–69	—	West	3rd	76	20	35	21	—	61	174	225	4	0	4	3	17	Lost quarterfinals to St. Louis Blues, 0–4
1969–70	1969–70	—	West	5th	76	17	35	24	—	58	197	225	—	—	—	—	—	Did not qualify
1970–71	1970–71	—	West	3rd	78	28	33	17	—	73	207	225	4	0	4	8	20	Lost quarterfinals to Chicago Black Hawks, 0–4
1971–72	1971–72	—	West	5th	78	26	38	14	—	66	200	236	—	—	—	—	—	Did not qualify
1972–73	1972–73	—	West	2nd	78	37	30	11	—	85	296	256	11	5	6	27	31	Won quarterfinals vs. Minnesota North Stars, 4–2; Lost semifinals to Montreal Canadiens, 1–4
1973–74	1973–74	—	West↑	1st	78	50	16	12	—	112	273	164	17	12	5	54	36	Won quarterfinals vs. Atlanta Flames, 4–0; Won semifinals vs. New York Rangers, 4–3; Won Stanley Cup Final vs. Boston Bruins, 4–2†
1974–75	1974–75	Campbell (Note: The NHL realigned before the 1974–75 season. The Flyers were placed in the Clarence Campbell Conference's Patrick Division.)‡	Patrick↑	1st	80	51	18	11	—	113#	293	181	17	12	5	53	34	Won quarterfinals vs. Toronto Maple Leafs, 4–0; Won semifinals vs. New York Islanders, 4–3; Won Stanley Cup Final vs. Buffalo Sabres, 4–2†
1975–76	1975–76	Campbell‡	Patrick↑	1st	80	51	13	16	—	118	348	209	16	8	8	56	52	Won quarterfinals vs. Toronto Maple Leafs, 4–3; Won semifinals vs. Boston Bruins, 4–1; Lost Stanley Cup Final to Montreal Canadiens, 0–4
1976–77	1976–77	Campbell‡	Patrick↑	1st	80	48	16	16	—	112	323	213	10	4	6	27	32	Won quarterfinals vs. Toronto Maple Leafs, 4–2; Lost semifinals to Boston Bruins, 0–4
1977–78	1977–78	Campbell	Patrick	2nd	80	45	20	15	—	105	296	200	12	7	5	37	35	Won preliminary round vs. Colorado Rockies, 2–0; Won quarterfinals vs. Buffalo Sabres, 4–1; Lost semifinals to Boston Bruins, 1–4
1978–79	1978–79	Campbell	Patrick	2nd	80	40	25	15	—	95	281	248	8	3	5	23	37	Won preliminary round vs. Vancouver Canucks, 2–1; Lost quarterfinals to New York Rangers, 1–4
1979–80	1979–80	Campbell‡	Patrick↑	1st	80	48	12	20	—	116#	327	254	19	13	6	78	53	Won preliminary round vs. Edmonton Oilers, 3–0; Won quarterfinals vs. New York Rangers, 4–1; Won semifinals vs. Minnesota North Stars, 4–1; Lost Stanley Cup Final to New York Islanders, 2–4
1980–81	1980–81	Campbell	Patrick	2nd	80	41	24	15	—	97	313	249	12	6	6	48	39	Won preliminary round vs. Quebec Nordiques, 3–2; Lost quarterfinals to Calgary Flames, 3–4
1981–82	1981–82	Wales (Note: Before the 1981–82 season, the NHL moved the Patrick Division to the Prince of Wales Conference.)	Patrick	3rd	80	38	31	11	—	87	325	313	4	1	3	15	19	Lost division semifinals to New York Rangers, 1–3
1982–83	1982–83	Wales	Patrick↑	1st	80	49	23	8	—	106	326	240	3	0	3	9	18	Lost division semifinals to New York Rangers, 0–3
1983–84	1983–84	Wales	Patrick	3rd	80	44	26	10	—	98	350	290	3	0	3	5	15	Lost division semifinals to Washington Capitals, 0–3
1984–85	1984–85	Wales‡	Patrick↑	1st	80	53	20	7	—	113#	348	241	19	12	7	60	54	Won division semifinals vs. New York Rangers, 3–0; Won division finals vs. New York Islanders, 4–1; Won conference finals vs. Quebec Nordiques, 4–2; Lost Stanley Cup Final to Edmonton Oilers, 1–4
1985–86	1985–86	Wales	Patrick↑	1st	80	53	23	4	—	110	335	241	5	2	3	15	18	Lost division semifinals to New York Rangers, 2–3
1986–87	1986–87	Wales‡	Patrick↑	1st	80	46	26	8	—	100	310	245	26	15	11	85	73	Won division semifinals vs. New York Rangers, 4–2; Won division finals vs. New York Islanders, 4–3; Won conference finals vs. Montreal Canadiens, 4–2; Lost Stanley Cup Final to Edmonton Oilers, 3–4
1987–88	1987–88	Wales	Patrick	3rd	80	38	33	9	—	85	292	292	7	3	4	25	31	Lost division semifinals to Washington Capitals, 3–4
1988–89	1988–89	Wales	Patrick	4th	80	36	36	8	—	80	307	285	19	10	9	64	60	Won division semifinals vs. Washington Capitals, 4–2; Won division finals vs. Pittsburgh Penguins, 4–3; Lost conference finals to Montreal Canadiens, 2–4
1989–90	1989–90	Wales	Patrick	6th	80	30	39	11	—	71	290	297	—	—	—	—	—	Did not qualify
1990–91	1990–91	Wales	Patrick	5th	80	33	37	10	—	76	252	267	—	—	—	—	—	Did not qualify
1991–92	1991–92	Wales	Patrick	6th	80	32	37	11	—	75	252	273	—	—	—	—	—	Did not qualify
1992–93	1992–93	Wales	Patrick	5th	84	36	37	11	—	83	319	319	—	—	—	—	—	Did not qualify
1993–94	1993–94	Eastern (Note: The NHL realigned into Eastern and Western conferences prior to the 1993–94 season. Philadelphia was placed in the Eastern Conference's Atlantic Division.)	Atlantic	6th	84	35	39	10	—	80	294	314	—	—	—	—	—	Did not qualify
1994–95	1994–95	Eastern	Atlantic↑	1st	48 (Note: The season was shortened to 48 games because of the 1994–95 NHL lockout.)	28	16	4	—	60	150	132	15	10	5	50	43	Won conference quarterfinals vs. Buffalo Sabres, 4–1; Won conference semifinals vs. New York Rangers, 4–0; Lost conference finals to New Jersey Devils, 2–4
1995–96	1995–96	Eastern	Atlantic↑	1st	82	45	24	13	—	103	282	208	12	6	6	37	28	Won conference quarterfinals vs. Tampa Bay Lightning, 4–2; Lost conference semifinals to Florida Panthers, 2–4
1996–97	1996–97	Eastern‡	Atlantic	2nd	82	45	24	13	—	103	274	217	19	12	7	67	49	Won conference quarterfinals vs. Pittsburgh Penguins, 4–1; Won conference semifinals vs. Buffalo Sabres, 4–1; Won conference finals vs. New York Rangers, 4–1; Lost Stanley Cup Final to Detroit Red Wings, 0–4
1997–98	1997–98	Eastern	Atlantic	2nd	82	42	29	11	—	95	242	193	5	1	4	9	18	Lost conference quarterfinals to Buffalo Sabres, 1–4
1998–99	1998–99	Eastern	Atlantic	2nd	82	37	26	19	—	93	231	196	6	2	4	11	9	Lost conference quarterfinals to Toronto Maple Leafs, 2–4
1999–2000	1999–2000	Eastern	Atlantic↑	1st	82	45	22	12	3 (Note: Beginning with the 1999–2000 season, teams received one point for losing a regular season game in overtime.)	105	237	179	18	11	7	44	40	Won conference quarterfinals vs. Buffalo Sabres, 4–1; Won conference semifinals vs. Pittsburgh Penguins, 4–2; Lost conference finals to New Jersey Devils, 3–4
2000–01	2000–01	Eastern	Atlantic	2nd	82	43	25	11	3	100	240	207	6	2	4	13	21	Lost conference quarterfinals to Buffalo Sabres, 2–4
2001–02	2001–02	Eastern	Atlantic↑	1st	82	42	27	10	3	97	234	192	5	1	4	2	11	Lost conference quarterfinals to Ottawa Senators, 1–4
2002–03	2002–03	Eastern	Atlantic	2nd	82	45	20	13	4	107	211	166	13	6	7	34	33	Won conference quarterfinals vs. Toronto Maple Leafs, 4–3; Lost conference semifinals to Ottawa Senators, 2–4
2003–04	2003–04	Eastern	Atlantic↑	1st	82	40	21	15	6	101	229	186	18	11	7	50	43	Won conference quarterfinals vs. New Jersey Devils, 4–1; Won conference semifinals vs. Toronto Maple Leafs, 4–2; Lost conference finals to Tampa Bay Lightning, 3–4
2004–05	2004–05 (Note: The season was canceled because of the 2004–05 NHL lockout.)	Eastern	Atlantic	Season canceled due to 2004–05 NHL lockout														
2005–06	2005–06	Eastern	Atlantic	2nd	82	45	26	— (Note: Before the 2005–06 season, the NHL instituted a penalty shootout for regular season games that remained tied after a five-minute overtime period, which eliminated ties.)	11	101	267	259	6	2	4	14	27	Lost conference quarterfinals to Buffalo Sabres, 2–4
2006–07	2006–07	Eastern	Atlantic	5th	82	22	48	—	12	56	214	303	—	—	—	—	—	Did not qualify
2007–08	2007–08	Eastern	Atlantic	4th	82	42	29	—	11	95	248	233	17	9	8	52	52	Won conference quarterfinals vs. Washington Capitals, 4–3; Won conference semifinals vs. Montreal Canadiens, 4–1; Lost conference finals to Pittsburgh Penguins, 1–4
2008–09	2008–09	Eastern	Atlantic	3rd	82	44	27	—	11	99	264	238	6	2	4	16	16	Lost conference quarterfinals to Pittsburgh Penguins, 2–4
2009–10	2009–10	Eastern‡	Atlantic	3rd	82	41	35	—	6	88	235	225	23	14	9	76	61	Won conference quarterfinals vs. New Jersey Devils, 4–1; Won conference semifinals vs. Boston Bruins, 4–3; Won conference finals vs. Montreal Canadiens, 4–1; Lost Stanley Cup Final to Chicago Blackhawks, 2–4
2010–11	2010–11	Eastern	Atlantic↑	1st	82	47	23	—	12	106	259	223	11	4	7	29	38	Won conference quarterfinals vs. Buffalo Sabres, 4–3; Lost conference semifinals to Boston Bruins, 0–4
2011–12	2011–12	Eastern	Atlantic	3rd	82	47	26	—	9	103	264	232	11	5	6	41	44	Won conference quarterfinals vs. Pittsburgh Penguins, 4–2; Lost conference semifinals to New Jersey Devils, 1–4
2012–13	2012–13	Eastern	Atlantic	4th	48 (Note: The season was shortened to 48 games because of the 2012–13 NHL lockout.)	23	22	—	3	49	133	141	—	—	—	—	—	Did not qualify
2013–14	2013–14	Eastern	Metropolitan (Note: The NHL realigned prior to the 2013–14 season. Philadelphia was placed in the Eastern Conference's Metropolitan Division.)	3rd	82	42	30	—	10	94	236	235	7	3	4	16	19	Lost first round to New York Rangers, 3–4
2014–15	2014–15	Eastern	Metropolitan	6th	82	33	31	—	18	84	215	234	—	—	—	—	—	Did not qualify
2015–16	2015–16	Eastern	Metropolitan	5th	82	41	27	—	14	96	214	218	6	2	4	6	14	Lost first round to Washington Capitals, 2–4
2016–17	2016–17	Eastern	Metropolitan	6th	82	39	33	—	10	88	219	236	—	—	—	—	—	Did not qualify
2017–18	2017–18	Eastern	Metropolitan	3rd	82	42	26	—	14	98	251	243	6	2	4	15	28	Lost first round to Pittsburgh Penguins, 2–4
2018–19	2018–19	Eastern	Metropolitan	6th	82	37	37	—	8	82	244	281	—	—	—	—	—	Did not qualify
2019–20	2019–20	Eastern	Metropolitan	2nd	69 (Note: The 2019–20 NHL regular season was suspended on March 12, 2020 due to the COVID-19 pandemic. The league made its return to play on August 1, 2020 with a 24-team playoff format.)	41	21	—	7	89	232	196	16	10	6	38	40	Finished first in seeding round-robin (3–0); Won first round vs. Montreal Canadiens, 4–2; Lost second round to New York Islanders, 3–4
2020–21	2020–21 (Note: Due to the COVID-19 pandemic, the 2020–21 NHL season was shortened to 56 games.)	—	East	6th	56	25	23	—	8	58	163	201	—	—	—	—	—	Did not qualify
2021–22	2021–22	Eastern	Metropolitan	8th	82	25	46	—	11	61	211	298	—	—	—	—	—	Did not qualify
2022–23	2022–23	Eastern	Metropolitan	7th	82	31	38	—	13	75	222	277	—	—	—	—	—	Did not qualify
2023–24	2023–24	Eastern	Metropolitan	6th	82	38	33	—	11	87	235	261	—	—	—	—	—	Did not qualify
2024–25	2024–25	Eastern	Metropolitan	8th	82	33	39	—	10	76	238	286	—	—	—	—	—	Did not qualify
2025–26	2025–26	Eastern	Metropolitan	3rd	82	43	27	—	12	98	250	243	10	4	6	21	24	Won first round vs. Pittsburgh Penguins, 4–2; Lost second round to Carolina Hurricanes, 0–4
Totals (Note: Totals as of the completion of the 2025–26 season)					4,581	2,249	1,635	457	240	5,195	14,770	13,513	459	235	224	1,356	1,356	41 playoff appearances

== See also ==
- List of NHL seasons
