= Reid Bailey =

Canadian ice hockey player

- Born: May 28, 1956 (age 70) Toronto, Ontario, Canada
- Height: 6 ft 1 in (185 cm)
- Weight: 193 lb (88 kg; 13 st 11 lb)
- Position: Defence
- Shot: Left
- Played for: Toronto Maple Leafs; Philadelphia Flyers; Hartford Whalers
- NHL draft: Undrafted
- Playing career: 1976–1984

Reid Bailey (born May 28, 1956) is a Canadian retired professional ice hockey defensemen who played three seasons in the National Hockey League (NHL) for the Philadelphia Flyers, Toronto Maple Leafs and Hartford Whalers.

Undrafted into the NHL, Bailey signed a free agent contract with the Philadelphia Flyers on November 20, 1978.

== Career statistics ==
=== Regular season and playoffs ===
			Regular season					Playoffs
Season	Team	League	GP	G	A	Pts	PIM	GP	G	A	Pts	PIM
1973–74	Sault Ste. Marie Greyhounds	OHA	60	6	14	20	48	—	—	—	—	—
1974–75	Sault Ste. Marie Greyhounds	OMJHL	62	7	30	37	115	—	—	—	—	—
1975–76	Sault Ste. Marie Greyhounds	OMJHL	9	0	2	2	47	—	—	—	—	—
1975–76	Kitchener Rangers	OMJHL	24	0	15	15	80	—	—	—	—	—
1975–76	Cornwall Royals	QMJHL	26	1	8	9	32	—	—	—	—	—
1976–77	Port Huron Flags	IHL	72	3	14	17	148	—	—	—	—	—
1977–78	Port Huron Flags	IHL	72	3	28	31	162	17	0	7	7	58
1978–79	Maine Mariners	AHL	56	6	8	14	127	6	0	0	0	10
1979–80	Maine Mariners	AHL	75	0	12	12	155	12	1	1	2	22
1980–81	Maine Mariners	AHL	59	6	29	35	155	—	—	—	—	—
1980–81	Philadelphia Flyers	NHL	17	1	3	4	55	12	0	2	2	23
1981–82	Maine Mariners	AHL	54	4	26	30	55	2	0	1	1	2
1981–82	Philadelphia Flyers	NHL	10	0	0	0	23	2	0	0	0	0
1982–83	Moncton Alpines	AHL	21	0	9	9	22	—	—	—	—	—
1982–83	St. Catharines Saints	AHL	34	0	14	14	62	—	—	—	—	—
1982–83	Toronto Maple Leafs	NHL	1	0	0	0	2	2	0	0	0	2
1983–84	St. Catharines Saints	AHL	25	0	8	8	73	—	—	—	—	—
1983–84	Binghamton Whalers	AHL	33	2	11	13	95	—	—	—	—	—
1983–84	Hartford Whalers	NHL	12	0	0	0	25	—	—	—	—	—
AHL totals			357	18	117	135	744	20	1	2	3	34
NHL totals			40	1	3	4	105	16	0	2	2	25
