= Robbie Moore (ice hockey) =

Canadian ice hockey player (1954–2022)

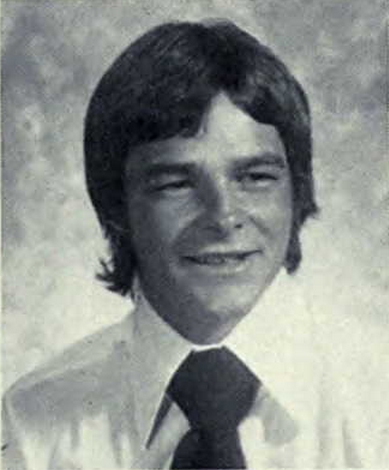
- Moore from 1976 Michiganensian
- Born: May 3, 1954 Sarnia, Ontario, Canada
- Died: January 7, 2022 (aged 67) Sarnia, Ontario, Canada
- Height: 5 ft 5 in (165 cm)
- Weight: 155 lb (70 kg; 11 st 1 lb)
- Position: Goaltender
- Caught: Left
- Played for: Philadelphia Flyers; Washington Capitals
- NHL draft: Undrafted
- WHA draft: 187th overall, 1974; New England Whalers
- Playing career: 1978–1984

Robert David Moore (May 3, 1954 – January 7, 2022) was a Canadian professional ice hockey goaltender. He played 6 games in the National Hockey League for the Philadelphia Flyers and Washington Capitals during the 1978–79 and 1982–83 seasons. He played his college hockey at the University of Michigan and the University of Western Ontario. Author John U. Bacon claims that Moore was one of the first goalies in either college or professional hockey to not only come out of his net and handle the puck like a defenseman, but "actually shoot it as well as the forwards." As a minor league goaltender, Moore won the Harry "Hap" Holmes Memorial Award in 1978–79, 1979–80 and 1980–81, sharing the award with a different teammate each time.

== Biography ==
Moore played for the University of Michigan from 1972 to 1976. He was an NCAA West first-team All-American in 1974, and a second-team WCHA All Star in 1976. As of 2001, Moore held the Michigan Wolverines hockey record for most saves by a goaltender with 4,434. He played for the University of Western Ontario for the 1976-77 season. Moore was drafted by the New England Whalers of the World Hockey Association in the 11th round of the 1974 WHA Amateur Draft but he did not sign with the Whalers. Although undrafted by the National Hockey League (NHL), he signed as a free agent with the NHL Philadelphia Flyers on November 7, 1978.

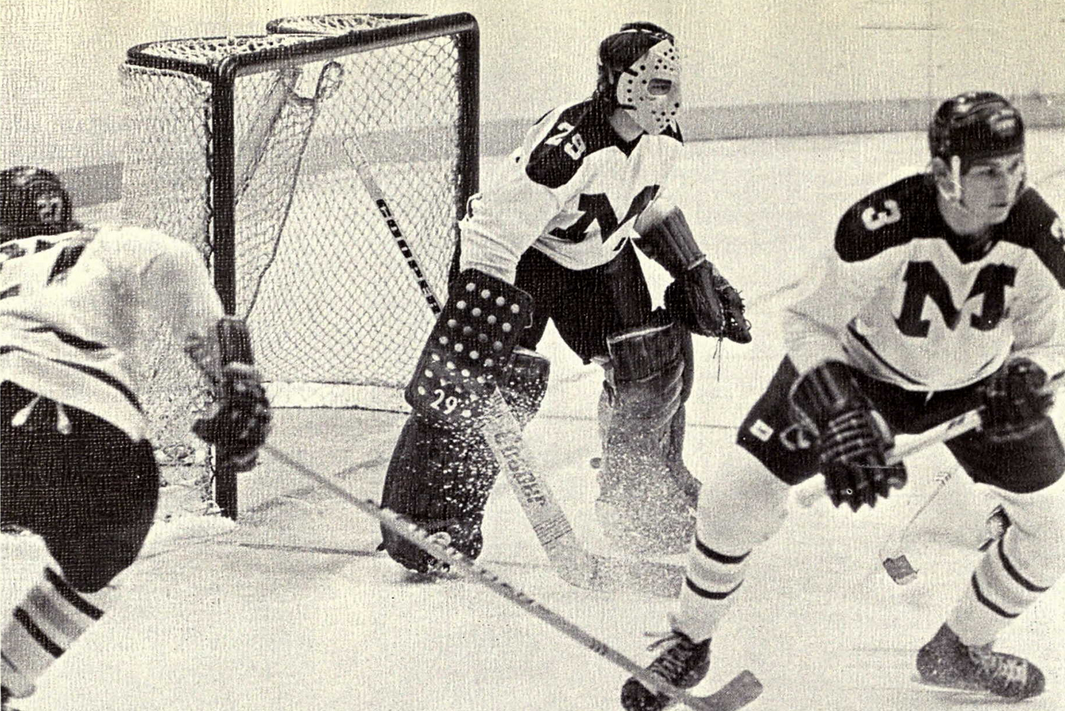
Moore in the net for Michigan, 1974

Moore spent most of his first three professional hockey seasons with the Flyers' American Hockey League (AHL) affiliate, the Maine Mariners. In 1978–79, Moore shared the Mariners' goalie job with Pete Peeters and Rick St. Croix, posting a 3.38 goals against average in 26 games as the Mariners won the Calder Cup as the AHL champions. The Mariners led the AHL in goals against average for the season, and Moore and Peeters shared the Harry "Hap" Holmes Memorial Award, awarded to the goalies who play at least 25 games for the team that leads the AHL with the lowest goals against average. Moore also played five regular season games for the Flyers that season after Hall of Fame goalie Bernie Parent suffered a career-ending eye injury. His NHL debut came on March 6, 1979 against the Colorado Rockies, and Moore registered a 5–0 shutout in his debut. In his five NHL regular season games, Moore had a 1.77 goals against average and also earned one assist. He ended up with two shutouts in his five NHL games, placing him in the top 10 for NHL shutouts that season, in a tie for 9th overall.

Moore was also on the Flyers' roster for the 1979 playoffs. He played five games in the playoffs as well, more than any other Flyers' goalie that season. He had a 4.03 goals against average in the playoffs and one assist, as the Flyers won their first round playoff series against the Vancouver Canucks but lost to the New York Rangers in the second round.

Moore spent the entire 1979-80 season with the Maine Mariners, sharing the goaltending duties primarily with St. Croix. Moore played 32 games with a 3.51 goals against average. The Mariners again led the AHL in goals against average and Moore again earned the Harry "Hap" Holmes Memorial Award, sharing it with St. Croix this time. In 1980-81 Moore again played the entire season with the Mariners, playing 25 games with a 3.86 goals against average while sharing the goaltending job with Pelle Lindbergh and Sam St. Laurent. The Mariners led the AHL in goals against average once again, and Moore earned his third consecutive Harry "Hap" Holmes Memorial Award, this time sharing the award with Lindbergh.

After the 1980–81 season, Moore was signed as a free agent by the Minnesota North Stars. Moore played the entire 1981–82 season for the Nashville South Stars of the Central Hockey League. After the 1981–1982 season, Moore was traded with a draft choice to the Washington Capitals in exchange for Wes Jarvis and Rollie Boutin. Moore spent most of the 1982–83 season with Washington's AHL affiliate Hershey Bears, but did play in one game for the Capitals that season. Moore spent the 1983–84 season, his last as a professional, with the Milwaukee Admirals of the International Hockey League.

Moore died in Sarnia on January 7, 2022, at the age of 67.

== Awards and honors ==
Award	Year
AHCA West All-American	1973–74
All-WCHA Second Team	1975–76

== Career statistics ==
			Regular season									Playoffs
Season	Team	League	GP	W	L	T	MIN	GA	SO	GAA	SV%	GP	W	L	MIN	GA	SO	GAA	SV%
1971–72	Sarnia Bees	SOJHL	18	—	—	—	1069	64	1	3.59	—	—	—	—	—	—	—	—	—
1972–73	University of Michigan	WCHA	31	—	—	—	1853	176	0	5.74	.877	—	—	—	—	—	—	—	—
1973–74	University of Michigan	WCHA	34	—	—	—	2010	144	0	4.32	.893	—	—	—	—	—	—	—	—
1974–75	University of Michigan	WCHA	24	—	—	—	1410	94	0	3.97	.897	—	—	—	—	—	—	—	—
1975–76	University of Michigan	WCHA	36	—	—	—	2141	157	1	4.31	.881	—	—	—	—	—	—	—	—
1976–77	University of Western Ontario	CIAU	30	—	—	—	770	52	—	4.05	—	—	—	—	—	—	—	—	—
1978–79	Maine Mariners	AHL	26	12	6	6	1489	84	1	3.38	.888	4	1	2	163	9	0	3.31	—
1978–79	Philadelphia Flyers	NHL	5	3	0	1	237	7	2	1.77	.927	5	3	2	266	18	0	4.06	.854
1979–80	Maine Mariners	AHL	32	14	11	4	1829	107	1	3.51	.884	7	5	2	448	21	1	2.81	—
1980–81	Maine Mariners	AHL	25	11	11	2	1431	92	1	3.86	.868	4	0	3	139	14	0	6.04	—
1981–82	Nashville South Stars	CHL	39	18	17	1	2204	159	0	4.33	.863	—	—	—	—	—	—	—	—
1982–83	Washington Capitals	NHL	1	0	1	0	20	1	0	3.04	.857	—	—	—	—	—	—	—	—
1982–83	Hershey Bears	AHL	35	15	14	1	1798	115	1	3.84	.876	1	0	1	87	3	0	2.07	—
1983–84	Milwaukee Admirals	IHL	49	26	17	4	2789	195	0	4.20	.866	4	0	—	206	13	0	3.79	—
NHL totals			6	3	1	1	257	8	2	1.87	.922	5	3	2	266	18	0	4.06	.854
