= Rick St. Croix =

Canadian ice hockey player and coach

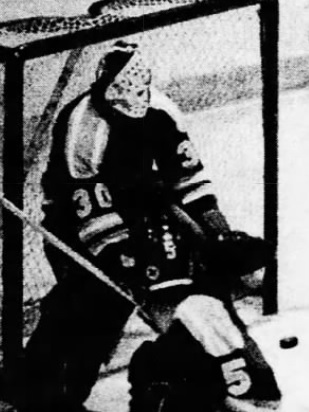
- St. Croix with the Flint Generals, circa 1977
- Born: January 3, 1955 (age 71) Kenora, Ontario, Canada
- Height: 5 ft 10 in (178 cm)
- Weight: 160 lb (73 kg; 11 st 6 lb)
- Position: Goaltender
- Caught: Left
- Played for: Philadelphia Flyers; Toronto Maple Leafs
- NHL draft: 72nd overall, 1975; Philadelphia Flyers
- WHA draft: 169th overall, 1975; Houston Aeros
- Playing career: 1975–1986

Richard St. Croix (born January 3, 1955) is a Canadian former professional ice hockey goaltender. He played 131 games in the National Hockey League with the Philadelphia Flyers and Toronto Maple Leafs between 1978 and 1985. After his playing career he worked as an assistant coach for the Maple Leafs. He also served as a goaltending coach for the Dallas Stars, and an assistant coach and goaltending coach for the Manitoba Moose and St. John's IceCaps of the American Hockey League. He was selected in the fourth round of the 1975 NHL Amateur Draft by the Flyers, and his two sons would also be drafted, though neither played in the NHL.

== Playing career ==
St. Croix was drafted by the Philadelphia Flyers in the fourth round of the 1975 NHL Amateur Draft after a junior hockey career with the Oshawa Generals of the Ontario Hockey Association (OHA). He was also drafted by the World Hockey Association Houston Aeros in the 13th round of the 1975 WHA Amateur Draft. He had been a Second Team OHA All Star in 1973.

St. Croix made his NHL debut for the Flyers during the 1977–78 season on February 16, 1978 at the Spectrum against the Minnesota North Stars. He played 7 games for the Flyers that season, while playing most of the season with the Maine Mariners of the American Hockey League (AHL). He played 2 games for the Flyers in 1978–79 and one game for the record-setting Flyer team of 1979-80. In 1979–80 he also won the Hap Holmes Memorial Award, awarded to goaltenders playing at least 25 games for the AHL team with the lowest goals against average, sharing the award with teammate Robbie Moore. He was also named a First Team AHL All-Star that season. 1980-81 was St. Croix's first full season in the NHL, in which he split time as the Flyers' goaltender with Pete Peeters and Phil Myre. He spent parts of three seasons with the Flyers before being traded to the Toronto Maple Leafs during the 1982–83 season in exchange for goaltender Michel Larocque.

St. Croix's final season in the NHL was 1984–85, which he split between the Maple Leafs and the St. Catharines Saints in the AHL. He spent one more season as a professional hockey player, 1985-86 with the International Hockey League (IHL) Fort Wayne Komets. With the Komets that season, he shared the IHL James Norris Memorial Trophy with teammate Pokey Reddick, awarded to the goaltender(s) having the fewest goals against during the season. He was also named an IHL Second Team All Star that season.

== Coaching career ==
After retiring as a player, St. Croix became a coach. He served as an assistant coach for the Winnipeg Jets for the 1987–88 and 1988-89 seasons. He was later named goaltending coach for the Dallas Stars where he won the Stanley Cup with the team in 1999. St. Croix was goaltending coach for the Manitoba Moose from 2008 to 2011. Prior to the 2011–12 season, the team was relocated to Newfoundland and renamed the St. John's IceCaps where St. Croix continued to serve as an assistant coach/goaltending coach. In September 2012, with the resignation of Francois Allaire, St. Croix was hired as the Toronto Maple Leafs goaltending coach. St. Croix was fired in an organizational housecleaning on April 12, 2015.

When the IceCaps returned as the Manitoba Moose in 2015, St. Croix rejoined the organization as developmental goaltending coach and scout until he retired in 2021.

== Personal ==
St. Croix's oldest son, Chris, was a 4th round draft choice of the Calgary Flames in the 1997 NHL entry draft, and played professional hockey as a defenseman in Germany, as well as in the AHL, ECHL and CHL. His youngest son, Michael played junior hockey as a forward for the Edmonton Oil Kings of the Western Hockey League. He was drafted by the New York Rangers in the 4th round of the 2011 NHL entry draft. Michael played several years in the AHL and ECHL before retiring in 2016. He also has two daughters. In addition to his coaching duties, St. Croix also runs a goaltending school.

== Career statistics ==
=== Regular season and playoffs ===
| | | | Regular season | | | | | | | | | Playoffs |
| Season | Team | League | GP | W | L | T | MIN | GA | SO | GAA | SV% | GP | W | L | MIN | GA | SO | GAA | SV% |
|---|---|---|---|---|---|---|---|---|---|---|---|---|---|---|---|---|---|---|---|
| 1970–71 | Kenora Muskies | MJHL | 23 | — | — | — | 1265 | 71 | 0 | 3.37 | .922 | — | — | — | — | — | — | — | — |
| 1971–72 | Kenora Muskies | MJHL | 43 | — | — | — | 2402 | 172 | 0 | 4.30 | .892 | — | — | — | — | — | — | — | — |
| 1971–72 | Winnipeg Jets | WCHL | 3 | 1 | 1 | 0 | 160 | 13 | 0 | 4.88 | — | — | — | — | — | — | — | — | — |
| 1972–73 | Oshawa Generals | OHA | 52 | — | — | — | 3176 | 247 | 0 | 4.67 | .882 | — | — | — | — | — | — | — | — |
| 1973–74 | Oshawa Generals | OHA | 33 | — | — | — | 1932 | 130 | 1 | 4.04 | — | — | — | — | — | — | — | — | — |
| 1974–75 | Oshawa Generals | OMJHL | 32 | — | — | — | 1965 | 131 | 1 | 4.00 | — | 1 | 0 | 1 | 60 | 9 | 0 | 9.00 | — |
| 1975–76 | Flint Generals | IHL | 42 | — | — | — | 2201 | 118 | 0 | 3.22 | — | — | — | — | — | — | — | — | — |
| 1976–77 | Flint Generals | IHL | 53 | — | — | — | 2956 | 179 | 3 | 3.63 | — | 5 | 1 | 4 | 337 | 30 | 0 | 5.34 | — |
| 1976–77 | Springfield Indians | AHL | 1 | 1 | 0 | 0 | 60 | 3 | 0 | 3.00 | — | — | — | — | — | — | — | — | — |
| 1977–78 | Philadelphia Flyers | NHL | 7 | 2 | 4 | 1 | 394 | 20 | 0 | 3.05 | .879 | — | — | — | — | — | — | — | — |
| 1977–78 | Maine Mariners | AHL | 40 | 22 | 14 | 2 | 2266 | 116 | 2 | 3.07 | — | 4 | 1 | 3 | 174 | 18 | 0 | 6.21 | — |
| 1978–79 | Philadelphia Flyers | NHL | 2 | 0 | 1 | 1 | 117 | 6 | 0 | 3.08 | .887 | — | — | — | — | — | — | — | — |
| 1978–79 | Philadelphia Firebirds | AHL | 9 | 4 | 4 | 1 | 484 | 22 | 0 | 2.73 | — | — | — | — | — | — | — | — | — |
| 1978–79 | Maine Mariners | AHL | 22 | 10 | 9 | 3 | 1312 | 63 | 0 | 2.88 | — | — | — | — | — | — | — | — | — |
| 1979–80 | Philadelphia Flyers | NHL | 1 | 1 | 0 | 0 | 60 | 2 | 0 | 2.00 | .920 | — | — | — | — | — | — | — | — |
| 1979–80 | Maine Mariners | AHL | 46 | 25 | 14 | 7 | 2729 | 132 | 1 | 2.90 | .902 | 5 | 1 | 4 | 311 | 16 | 0 | 3.09 | — |
| 1980–81 | Philadelphia Flyers | NHL | 27 | 13 | 7 | 6 | 1564 | 65 | 2 | 2.50 | .913 | 9 | 4 | 5 | 538 | 27 | 1 | 3.01 | .892 |
| 1981–82 | Philadelphia Flyers | NHL | 29 | 13 | 9 | 6 | 1726 | 112 | 0 | 3.89 | .870 | 1 | 0 | 1 | 20 | 1 | 0 | 3.11 | .875 |
| 1982–83 | Philadelphia Flyers | NHL | 16 | 9 | 5 | 2 | 939 | 54 | 0 | 3.45 | .875 | — | — | — | — | — | — | — | — |
| 1982–83 | Toronto Maple Leafs | NHL | 17 | 4 | 9 | 2 | 915 | 58 | 0 | 3.80 | .886 | 1 | 0 | 0 | 1 | 1 | 0 | 225.00 | .000 |
| 1983–84 | Toronto Maple Leafs | NHL | 20 | 5 | 10 | 0 | 937 | 80 | 0 | 5.13 | .849 | — | — | — | — | — | — | — | — |
| 1983–84 | St. Catharines Saints | AHL | 8 | 7 | 1 | 0 | 482 | 29 | 0 | 3.61 | — | 3 | 1 | 1 | 133 | 10 | 0 | 4.50 | — |
| 1984–85 | Toronto Maple Leafs | NHL | 12 | 2 | 9 | 0 | 628 | 56 | 0 | 5.35 | .824 | — | — | — | — | — | — | — | — |
| 1984–85 | St. Catharines Saints | AHL | 18 | 6 | 10 | 1 | 1076 | 92 | 0 | 5.33 | .849 | — | — | — | — | — | — | — | — |
| 1985–86 | Fort Wayne Komets | IHL | 42 | 25 | 13 | 0 | 2474 | 132 | 2 | 3.20 | — | 8 | 3 | 4 | 411 | 30 | 0 | 4.38 | — |
| NHL totals | | | 131 | 49 | 54 | 18 | 7277 | 453 | 2 | 3.74 | .875 | 11 | 4 | 6 | 557 | 29 | 1 | 3.12 | .888 |

== Awards ==
- 1973 OHA Second Team All Star
- 1980 Hap Holmes Memorial Award, AHL lowest goals against average, Maine Mariners
- 1980 AHL First Team All Star
- 1986 James Norris Memorial Trophy, IHL fewest goals allowed, Fort Wayne Komets
- 1986 IHL Second Team All Star
- 1999 Stanley Cup Championship, Dallas Stars (as goaltending coach)
