= Danny Lucas =

Canadian ice hockey player (born 1958)

- Born: February 28, 1958 (age 67) Powell River, British Columbia, Canada
- Height: 6 ft 1 in (185 cm)
- Weight: 197 lb (89 kg; 14 st 1 lb)
- Position: Right wing
- Shot: Left
- Played for: Philadelphia Flyers
- NHL draft: 14th overall, 1978; Philadelphia Flyers
- Playing career: 1978–1981

Daniel Kenneth Lucas (born February 28, 1958) is a Canadian former professional ice hockey right winger who played six National Hockey League (NHL) games for the Philadelphia Flyers during the 1978–79 season. He was drafted by the Flyers in the first round (14th overall) of the 1978 NHL Amateur Draft.

In 1977-78, Lucas was Wayne Gretzky’s right winger with the Sault Ste. Marie Greyhounds.

== Career statistics ==
			Regular season					Playoffs
Season	Team	League	GP	G	A	Pts	PIM	GP	G	A	Pts	PIM
1973–74	Humboldt Broncos	SJHL	18	11	11	22	14	—	—	—	—	—
1973–74	Victoria Cougars	WCHL	29	6	10	16	38	—	—	—	—	—
1974–75	Victoria Cougars	WCHL	70	57	56	113	74	12	3	2	5	22
1975–76	Victoria Cougars	WCHL	32	20	24	44	63	—	—	—	—	—
1976–77	UBC Thunderbirds	CWUAA	26	12	17	29	44	—	—	—	—	—
1977–78	Sault Ste. Marie Greyhounds	OMJHL	61	50	67	117	90	13	5	10	15	10
1978–79	Maine Mariners	AHL	70	21	19	40	54	10	3	6	9	4
1978–79	Philadelphia Flyers	NHL	6	1	0	1	0	—	—	—	—	—
1979–80	Maine Mariners	AHL	80	25	27	52	33	12	2	9	11	6
1980–81	Maine Mariners	AHL	2	0	0	0	2	—	—	—	—	—
1980–81	Fort Worth Texans	CHL	38	5	8	13	23	—	—	—	—	—
NHL totals			6	1	0	1	0	—	—	—	—	—
AHL totals			150	46	46	92	87	22	5	15	20	10

Preceded by Ken Linseman	Philadelphia Flyers' first-round draft pick 1978	Succeeded by Brian Propp
