= Ken Linseman =

Canadian ice hockey player (born 1958)

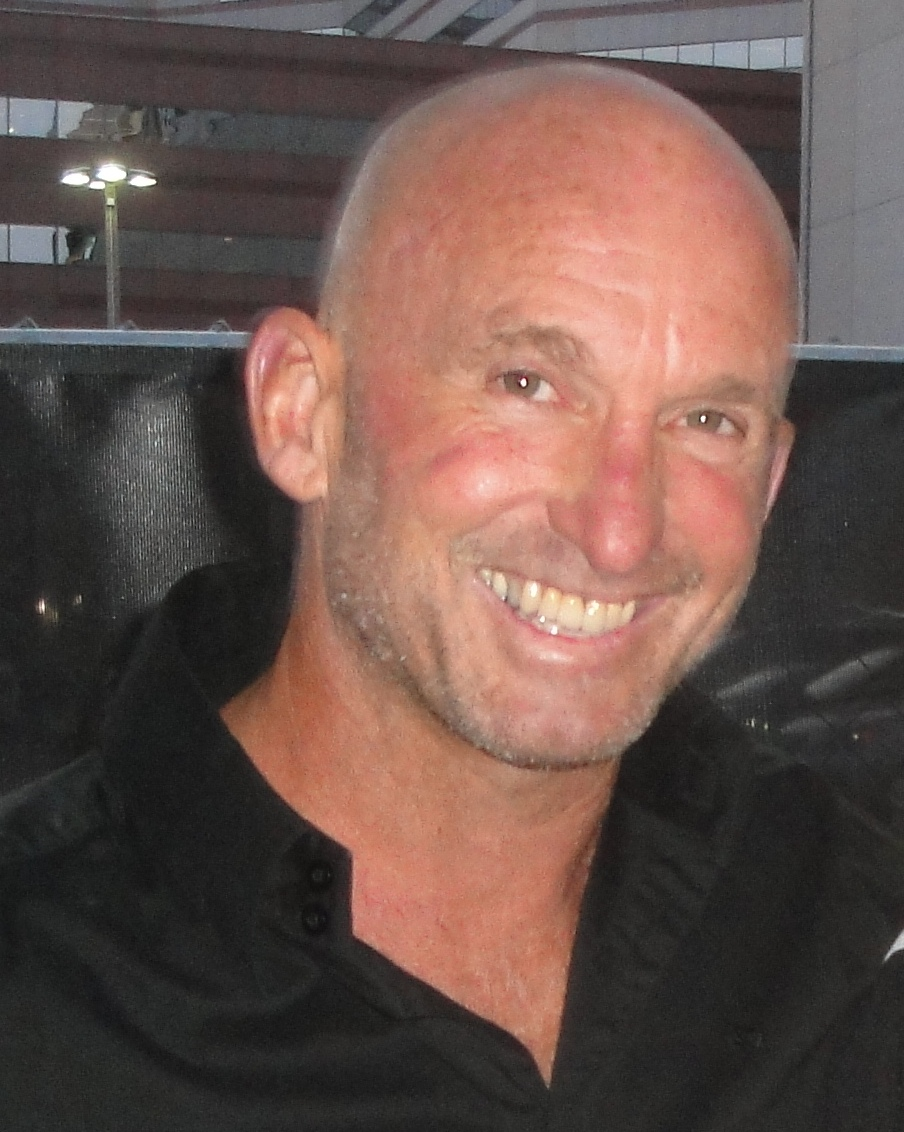
- Linseman in 2011
- Born: August 11, 1958 (age 68) Kingston, Ontario, Canada
- Height: 5 ft 11 in (180 cm)
- Weight: 180 lb (82 kg; 12 st 12 lb)
- Position: Centre
- Shot: Left
- Played for: Birmingham Bulls; Philadelphia Flyers; Edmonton Oilers; Boston Bruins; Toronto Maple Leafs
- National team: Canada
- NHL draft: 7th overall, 1978; Philadelphia Flyers
- WHA draft: 83rd overall, 1977; Birmingham Bulls
- Playing career: 1977–1992

Kenneth S. "The Rat" Linseman (born August 11, 1958) is a Canadian former professional ice hockey centre who played 15 seasons in the National Hockey League (NHL) for the Philadelphia Flyers, Edmonton Oilers, Boston Bruins and Toronto Maple Leafs. He also played one season in the World Hockey Association for the Birmingham Bulls. He featured in four Stanley Cup Finals, notably winning the 1984 Stanley Cup with the Oilers.

Linseman picked up the nickname "The Rat" both by his appearance and the way he played. He had a great talent for agitating the opposing team to a high level of frustration, leading them to take penalties. During his junior career, he was once charged for kicking a player in the head with his skates. Linseman averaged 1.062 points a game in the Stanley Cup playoffs, which is 26th best in league history.

== Playing career ==
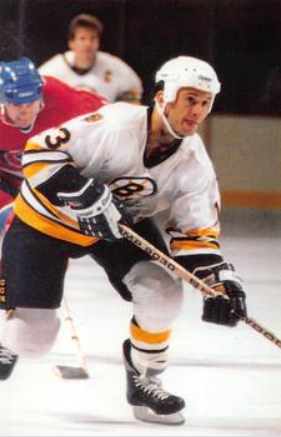
Linseman with Boston Bruins in 1984 postcard

Linseman spent his entire junior career with the Kingston Canadians of the Ontario Major Junior Hockey League from 1974–77. He played in 187 games, scoring 286 points (133 goals-153 assists). He also added 33 points (16G-17A) in 25 playoff games.

Prior to the 1977 WHA draft, Linseman and his agent Art Kaminsky sued the WHA in United States District Court for a league rule preventing teenage players from playing in the league, which the court ruled violated anti-trust laws. Linseman was drafted by the WHA's Birmingham Bulls in the 1977 WHA Amateur Draft, and spent the 1977–78 season with the Bulls, getting 76 points (38G-38A) in 71 games, and adding four points (2G-2A) in five playoff games. He was then drafted by the Flyers as their first-round, seventh overall pick in the 1978 NHL Amateur Draft.

Linseman began the 1978–79 season with the Maine Mariners of the American Hockey League, getting 39 points (17G-22A) in 38 games before getting called up by the Flyers. He finished the season in Philadelphia, earning 25 points (5G-20A) in 30 games, then added 8 points (2G-6A) in 8 post-season games. Linseman spent the entire 1979–80 season with the Flyers, getting 79 points (22G-57A) in 80 games, then added 22 points (4G-18A) in 17 playoff games as his team reached the Stanley Cup Final where they lost to the New York Islanders. An injury limited Linseman to 51 games in 1980–81, as he notched 47 points (17G-30A), and had 20 points (4G-16A) in 12 playoff games. The 1981–82 season was the best of Linseman's career, as he scored a career high 92 points (24G-68A) in 79 games, and had 275 PIM, which was seventh highest in the NHL. In four playoff games, Linseman registered 3 points (1G-2A). On August 19, 1982, the Flyers traded Linseman, along with Greg Adams and Philadelphia's first and third round picks in 1983, to the Hartford Whalers in exchange for Mark Howe and Hartford's third-round pick in 1983. The Whalers then swapped Linseman to the Edmonton Oilers with Don Nachbaur for Risto Siltanen and Brent Loney.

With the Oilers in 1982–83, Linseman had 75 points (33G-42A) in 72 games, and helped the Oilers to the Stanley Cup Final with 14 points (6G-8A) in 16 post-season games, although his team was swept by the New York Islanders. In 1983–84, Linseman had 67 points (18G-49A) in 75 games, and helped the Oilers win the Stanley Cup with 14 points (10G-4A) in 19 games, winning the Finals rematch against the Islanders. In the 1984 playoffs, he scored an NHL record three series-clinching goals, since tied by Martin Gélinas of the Calgary Flames in 2004. After winning the Stanley Cup, Linseman found himself on the move as the Oilers dealt him to the Boston Bruins for Mike Krushelnyski on June 21, 1984.

Linseman had a solid 1984–85 season, with 74 points (25G-49A) in 74 games, and added 10 points (4G-6A) in five playoff games. Injuries held Linseman to 64 games in 1985–86, but he scored 81 points (23G-58A), and in three playoff games, had one assist. His production fell in 1986–87, as he was held again to 64 games, getting 49 points (15G-34A), and in four playoff games, had 2 points (1G-1A). In 1987–88, Linseman was healthy again, and saw his point total increase, getting 74 points (29G-45A) in 77 games, and helped the Bruins to the Stanley Cup Finals, earning 25 points (11G-14A) in 23 playoff games, losing to the Oilers. Linseman had a productive 1988–89 season, as he got 72 points (27G-45A) in 78 games; however, a late season injury prevented him from playing in any playoff games. In 1989–90, Linseman began the season with Boston, playing in 32 games and getting 22 points (6G-16A). He was traded to the Flyers on January 16, 1990 in exchange for Dave Poulin. Linseman then played 29 games with the Flyers, getting 14 points (5G-9A) as the team failed to make the playoffs.

On August 31, 1990, Linseman signed as a free agent with the Oilers and spent the 1990–91 season with the team, getting 36 points (7G-29A) in 56 games, and had an assist in two playoff games. On October 7, 1991, the Oilers traded Linseman to the Maple Leafs for cash; however, Linseman spent only two games with Toronto, getting no points. He was released by the Leafs, and ended up playing 5 games in an Italian Hockey League with HC Asiago, getting six points (3G-3A) in five games, then seven points (3G-4A) in six playoff games. After the 1991–92 season, Linseman retired.

== Awards and achievements ==
- Stanley Cup champion – 1984
- OMJHL Second Team All-Star – 1977
- Bruins 3 Stars Award — 1985, 1986
- Named One of the Top 100 Best Bruins Players of all Time.

== Personal life ==
After retirement Linseman served as a minor hockey coach and as instructor at Deron Quint Hockey Camps in New Hampshire. Linseman still resides in the Boston area owning a commercial real estate development firm. He was also an avid surfer at Hampton Beach. On top of this he is an active member of the Bruins alumni organization. Playing in numerous games for the team in order to help raise money for charitable organizations.

During his playing days he was involved in horse racing being a part owner of a thoroughbred named Strike Gold.

== Career statistics ==
=== Regular season and playoffs ===
			Regular season					Playoffs
Season	Team	League	GP	G	A	Pts	PIM	GP	G	A	Pts	PIM
1974–75	Kingston Canadians	OMJHL	59	19	28	47	70	8	2	5	7	8
1975–76	Kingston Canadians	OMJHL	65	61	51	112	92	7	5	0	5	18
1976–77	Kingston Canadians	OMJHL	63	53	74	127	210	10	9	12	21	54
1977–78	Birmingham Bulls	WHA	71	38	38	76	126	5	2	2	4	15
1978–79	Maine Mariners	AHL	38	17	23	40	106	—	—	—	—	—
1978–79	Philadelphia Flyers	NHL	30	5	20	25	23	8	2	6	8	22
1979–80	Philadelphia Flyers	NHL	80	22	57	79	107	17	4	18	22	40
1980–81	Philadelphia Flyers	NHL	51	17	30	47	150	12	4	16	20	67
1981–82	Philadelphia Flyers	NHL	79	24	68	92	275	4	1	2	3	6
1982–83	Edmonton Oilers	NHL	72	33	42	75	181	16	6	8	14	22
1983–84	Edmonton Oilers	NHL	72	18	49	67	119	19	10	4	14	65
1984–85	Boston Bruins	NHL	74	25	49	74	126	5	4	6	10	8
1985–86	Boston Bruins	NHL	64	23	58	81	97	3	0	1	1	17
1986–87	Boston Bruins	NHL	64	15	34	49	126	4	1	1	2	22
1987–88	Boston Bruins	NHL	77	29	45	74	167	23	11	14	25	56
1988–89	Boston Bruins	NHL	78	27	45	72	164	—	—	—	—	—
1989–90	Boston Bruins	NHL	32	6	16	22	66	—	—	—	—	—
1989–90	Philadelphia Flyers	NHL	29	5	9	14	30	—	—	—	—	—
1990–91	Edmonton Oilers	NHL	56	7	29	36	94	2	0	1	1	0
1991–92	Toronto Maple Leafs	NHL	2	0	0	0	2	—	—	—	—	—
1991–92	HC Asiago	ITA	5	3	3	6	4	7	3	4	7	47
WHA totals			71	38	38	76	126	5	2	2	4	15
NHL totals			860	256	551	807	1,727	113	43	77	120	325

=== International ===
Year	Team	Event	GP	G	A	Pts	PIM
1981	Canada	CC	4	0	1	1	4

Preceded by Behn Wilson	Philadelphia Flyers' first-round draft pick 1978	Succeeded by Danny Lucas
