= Paul Evans (ice hockey, born 1954) =

Canadian ice hockey player

- Born: May 2, 1954 (age 70); Toronto, Ontario, Canada
- Height: 5 ft 9 in (175 cm)
- Weight: 180 lb (82 kg; 12 st 12 lb)
- Position: Centre
- Shot: Left
- Played for: Philadelphia Flyers
- NHL draft: 84th overall, 1974; Los Angeles Kings
- WHA draft: 55th overall, 1974; Chicago Cougars
- Playing career: 1974–1985

John Paul Evans (born May 2, 1954) is a Canadian former professional ice hockey centre who played three seasons in the National Hockey League (NHL) for the Philadelphia Flyers.

== Career statistics ==
| | | | Regular season | | | | | Playoffs |
| Season | Team | League | GP | G | A | Pts | PIM | GP | G | A | Pts | PIM |
|---|---|---|---|---|---|---|---|---|---|---|---|---|
| 1971–72 | Kitchener Rangers | OHA-Jr. | 57 | 30 | 38 | 68 | 10 | 5 | 2 | 2 | 4 | 0 |
| 1972–73 | Kitchener Rangers | OHA-Jr. | 63 | 29 | 47 | 76 | 22 | — | — | — | — | — |
| 1973–74 | Kitchener Rangers | OHA-Jr. | 69 | 52 | 60 | 112 | 45 | — | — | — | — | — |
| 1974–75 | Saginaw Gears | IHL | 60 | 21 | 35 | 56 | 42 | — | — | — | — | — |
| 1975–76 | Saginaw Gears | IHL | 78 | 32 | 53 | 85 | 65 | 12 | 3 | 10 | 13 | 6 |
| 1976–77 | Saginaw Gears | IHL | 78 | 50 | 62 | 112 | 53 | 19 | 10 | 15 | 25 | 2 |
| 1977–78 | Springfield Indians | AHL | 8 | 4 | 6 | 10 | 6 | — | — | — | — | — |
| 1977–78 | Maine Mariners | AHL | 66 | 26 | 35 | 61 | 28 | 12 | 3 | 6 | 9 | 14 |
| 1978–79 | Philadelphia Flyers | NHL | 44 | 6 | 5 | 11 | 12 | — | — | — | — | — |
| 1978–79 | Maine Mariners | AHL | 32 | 16 | 24 | 40 | 36 | 10 | 4 | 13 | 17 | 10 |
| 1979–80 | Maine Mariners | AHL | 80 | 21 | 56 | 77 | 66 | 12 | 3 | 7 | 10 | 18 |
| 1980–81 | Philadelphia Flyers | NHL | 1 | 0 | 0 | 0 | 0 | — | — | — | — | — |
| 1980–81 | Maine Mariners | AHL | 78 | 28 | 52 | 80 | 49 | 20 | 4 | 7 | 11 | 36 |
| 1981–82 | Maine Mariners | AHL | 79 | 33 | 57 | 90 | 42 | 4 | 2 | 3 | 5 | 2 |
| 1982–83 | Philadelphia Flyers | NHL | 58 | 8 | 20 | 28 | 20 | 1 | 0 | 0 | 0 | 0 |
| 1983–84 | Maine Mariners | AHL | 76 | 23 | 36 | 59 | 65 | 17 | 3 | 7 | 10 | 4 |
| 1984–85 | Maine Mariners | AHL | 78 | 17 | 36 | 53 | 26 | 11 | 3 | 2 | 5 | 0 |
| NHL totals | | | 103 | 14 | 25 | 39 | 34 | 1 | 0 | 0 | 0 | 0 |
| AHL totals | | | 497 | 168 | 302 | 470 | 318 | 86 | 22 | 45 | 67 | 84 |
