= Behn Wilson =

Canadian ice hockey player

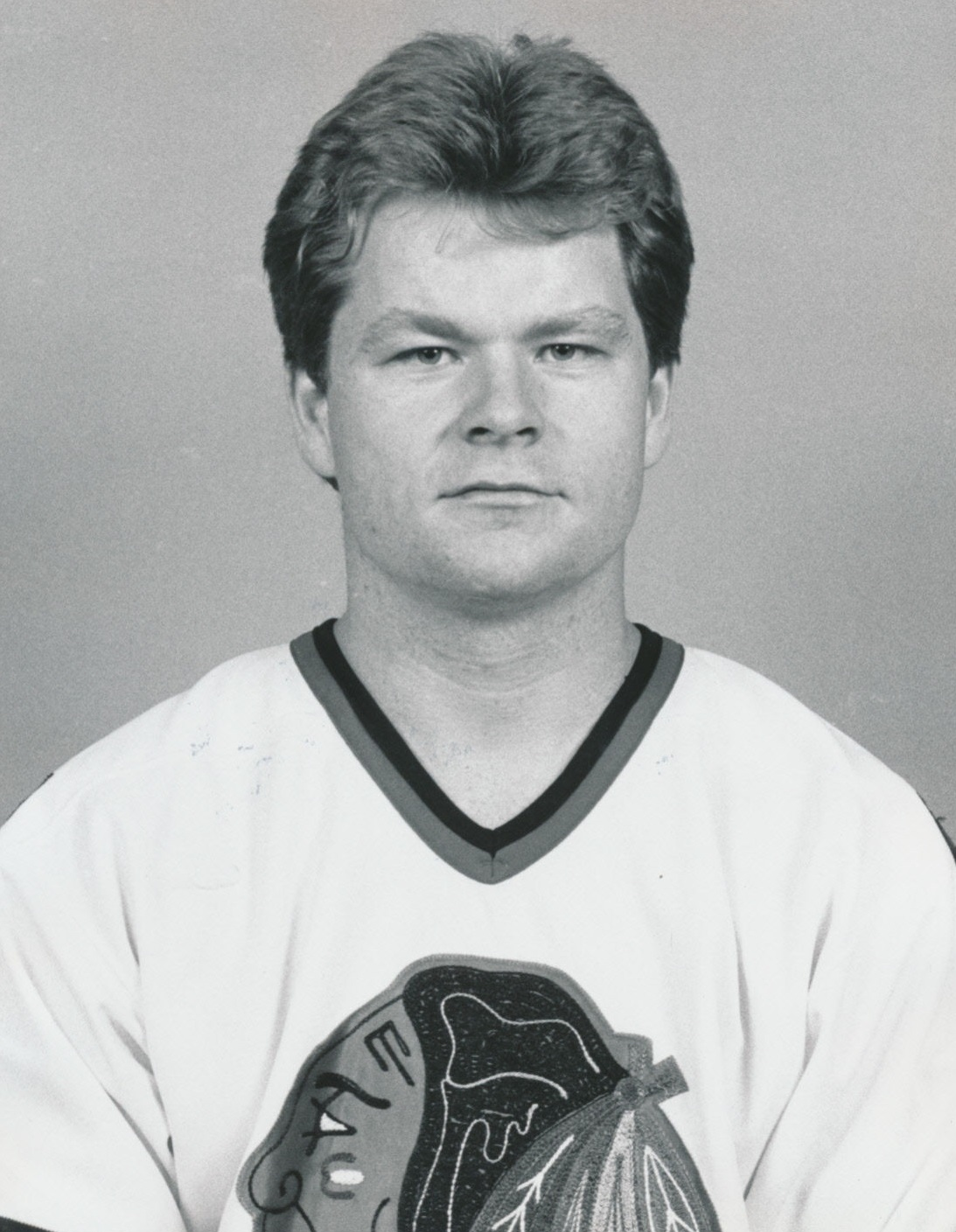
- Wilson in 1984
- Born: December 19, 1958 (age 67) Toronto, Ontario, Canada
- Height: 6 ft 3 in (191 cm)
- Weight: 220 lb (100 kg; 15 st 10 lb)
- Position: Defence
- Shot: Left
- Played for: Philadelphia Flyers; Chicago Black Hawks
- NHL draft: 6th overall, 1978; Philadelphia Flyers
- Playing career: 1978–1988

Bevan Alexander Behn Wilson (born December 19, 1958) is a Canadian former professional ice hockey defenceman who played nine seasons in the National Hockey League (NHL) for the Philadelphia Flyers and Chicago Black Hawks.

== Playing career ==
As a youth, Wilson played in the 1971 Quebec International Pee-Wee Hockey Tournament with a minor ice hockey team from Toronto.

Wilson played his junior hockey in the OMJHL with the Ottawa 67's from 1975 to 1977, the Windsor Spitfires from 1976 to 1977, and the Kingston Canadians from 1977 to 1978. In 163 career games, he produced 154 points (35 goals-119 assists), and in 14 playoff games, he registered 9 points (4G-5A). Wilson also played part of the 1976–77 season with the Kalamazoo Wings of the IHL, getting nine points (2G-7A) in 13 games. He was known for his both his end-to-end rushes and his penalty minutes in his junior career. Wilson was selected by the Philadelphia Flyers in the first round, sixth overall in the 1978 NHL entry draft.

Wilson stepped right into the Flyers lineup in 1978–79, playing in all 80 games, getting 49 points (18G-31A), along with 197 PIM. Those marks set team rookie records for a defenceman. In five playoff games, he scored one goal. In 1979–80, Wilson played in 61 games, earning 34 points (9G-25A) to go with 212 PIM. In the 1980 playoffs, he got 13 points (4G-9A) in 19 games. Wilson had his best season in 1980–81, getting 63 points (17G-46A) in 77 games, and a career high 237 PIM. He added 12 points (2G-10A) in 12 playoff games. Wilson's production slipped in 1981–82, getting 36 points (13G-23A) in 59 games, and five points (1G-4A) in four playoff games. In 1982–83, he played in 62 games, getting 32 points (8G-24A), and had an assist in three playoff games. On June 8, 1983, the Flyers traded Wilson to the Chicago Black Hawks for Doug Crossman and Chicago's second round pick in the 1984 NHL entry draft (Scott Mellanby).

Wilson appeared in 59 games in 1983–84, getting 32 points (10G-22A) with Chicago, then went pointless in four playoff games. In 1984–85, he registered 33 points (10G-23A), and added nine points (4G-5A) in 15 playoff games. Wilson had a very productive 1985–86 season, getting 51 points (13G-38A) in 69 games. In two playoff games, Wilson had no points. He missed the entire 1986–87 season due to a back injury, but came back in 1987–88 getting 29 points (6G-23A) in 58 games. On October 3, 1988, the Vancouver Canucks claimed Wilson in the waiver draft; however, he did not play in any games in the 1988–89 season due to his back injury, and retired afterwards.

== Career statistics ==
			Regular season					Playoffs
Season	Team	League	GP	G	A	Pts	PIM	GP	G	A	Pts	PIM
1974–75	Don Mills Flyers	MTHL	44	24	45	69		—	—	—	—	—
1975–76	Ottawa 67's	OMJHL	63	5	16	21	131	12	3	2	5	46
1976–77	Ottawa 67's	OMJHL	31	8	29	37	115	—	—	—	—	—
1976–77	Windsor Spitfires	OMJHL	17	4	16	20	38	—	—	—	—	—
1976–77	Kalamazoo Wings	IHL	13	2	7	9	40	—	—	—	—	—
1977–78	Kingston Canadians	OMJHL	52	18	58	76	186	2	1	3	4	21
1978–79	Philadelphia Flyers	NHL	80	13	36	49	197	5	1	0	1	8
1979–80	Philadelphia Flyers	NHL	61	9	25	34	212	19	4	9	13	66
1980–81	Philadelphia Flyers	NHL	77	16	47	63	237	12	2	10	12	36
1981–82	Philadelphia Flyers	NHL	59	13	23	36	135	4	1	4	5	10
1982–83	Philadelphia Flyers	NHL	62	8	24	32	92	3	0	1	1	2
1983–84	Chicago Black Hawks	NHL	59	10	22	32	143	4	0	0	0	0
1984–85	Chicago Black Hawks	NHL	76	10	23	33	185	15	4	5	9	60
1985–86	Chicago Black Hawks	NHL	69	13	38	51	113	2	0	0	0	2
1987–88	Chicago Blackhawks	NHL	58	6	23	29	166	3	0	0	0	0
NHL totals			601	98	260	358	1480	67	12	29	41	190

Preceded by Kevin McCarthy	Philadelphia Flyers' first-round draft pick 1978	Succeeded by Ken Linseman
