= Pete Peeters =

Canadian ice hockey player (born 1957)

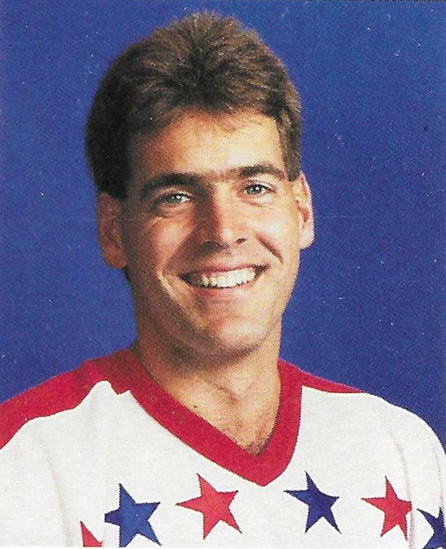
- Peeters with the Washington Capitals in 1987
- Born: August 17, 1957 (age 69) Edmonton, Alberta, Canada
- Height: 6 ft 0 in (183 cm)
- Weight: 185 lb (84 kg; 13 st 3 lb)
- Position: Goaltender
- Caught: Left
- Played for: Philadelphia Flyers; Boston Bruins; Washington Capitals
- National team: Canada
- NHL draft: 135th overall, 1977; Philadelphia Flyers
- Playing career: 1977–1991
Medal record
Representing Canada
Men's ice hockey
Canada Cup
Gold medal – first place	1984 Canada	Ice hockey

Pete Peeters (born August 17, 1957) is a Canadian former professional ice hockey goaltender. He was selected by the Philadelphia Flyers in the eighth round (135th overall) of the 1977 NHL amateur draft. and went on to play 13 seasons in the National Hockey League (NHL) for the Philadelphia Flyers, Boston Bruins and Washington Capitals. He featured in the 1980 Stanley Cup Final with the Flyers and won the 1984 Canada Cup with Team Canada. In his first season with the Bruins in 1982–83, he won the Vezina Trophy and finished second in voting for the Hart Memorial Trophy behind Wayne Gretzky.

== Early life ==
Peeters was born in a family of Dutch immigrants in Edmonton, Alberta. At a young age, he valued swimming more than hockey. It was not until he was 18 that Peeters was committed to junior hockey. In 1975, Peeters joined a struggling Medicine Hat Tigers team. He would stay with the Tigers for two years before being drafted. Peeters was drafted 135th overall by the Philadelphia Flyers in the 1977 NHL amateur draft after showing scouts that he had what it took to play at an NHL level. He played for two years in the AHL winning the Harry "Hap" Holmes Memorial Award for best GAA in the league, won back-to-back Calder Cups, and he was also selected to the first All-Star team.

== Playing career ==
=== Philadelphia Flyers ===
Peeters was called up by the Flyers in 1980 sharing the net with Phil Myre. Peeters started with a 22–0–5 record before losing his first game of the season on February 19. The Flyers went an NHL and professional sports record 35 straight games without a loss that season. Peeters finished the season with a 29–5–5 record with a 2.73 GAA. He led the Flyers all the way to the Stanley Cup Final before losing to the New York Islanders on an overtime goal by Bob Nystrom. For his effort, Peeters was selected to play in the NHL All-Star Game.

The following season, expectations were high for Peeters, but he did not meet them. Over the next two years his GAA rose and his playoff success diminished. Following an infamous incident in 1982 where he molested a reporter in the locker room, he was traded to the Boston Bruins for defenceman Brad McCrimmon.

=== Boston Bruins ===
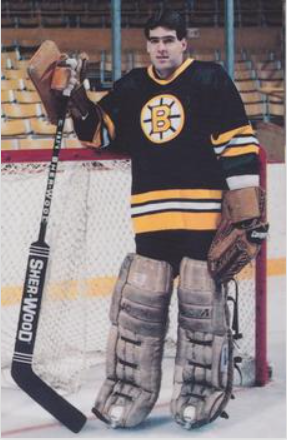
Peeters with the Boston Bruins in 1984

Peeters joined the Boston Bruins for the 1982–83 season. Peeters had his best year, playing in 62 games and posting a 40–11–9 record with 8 shutouts and a decade-best 2.36 GAA. At one point, Peeters went 31 games without a loss. He won the Vezina Trophy for his spectacular play and was selected First All-Star team goalie. He also played in the All-Star Game in his first season with Boston. Peeters finished second in voting for the Hart Memorial Trophy to Wayne Gretzky. Next season, expectations were high again for Peeters and, like in Philadelphia, he did not meet them. He played for two more years with the Bruins with his GAA inflating and the losses piling up.

=== 1984 Canada Cup ===
Peeters was invited to Team Canada for the 1984 Canada Cup. Despite having a sprained ankle, Peeters was able to play in four tournament games including both best-of-three final games against Sweden and the memorable overtime win against the Soviets in the semifinal.

=== Washington Capitals ===
After the Canada Cup experience, Peeters had trouble readjusting his game to the NHL level. After a slow start in the 1985–86 season, Peeters was traded to the Washington Capitals in exchange for goaltender Pat Riggin. Peeters had much success with the Caps by providing a solid goaltending for the next four seasons and became the team’s starting goalie in the playoffs. However, his team never advanced past the second round.

=== Return to Philadelphia ===
Peeters returned to Philadelphia in 1990 by way of free agency. He remained there for the last two seasons of his career sharing the net with Ron Hextall and Ken Wregget. Peeters would hang up the pads in 1991.

== Coaching ==
At the end of his playing career, Peeters returned to the family farm in Edmonton. He then got into coaching, serving as a goaltender coach to the Minnesota North Stars, Winnipeg Jets, Phoenix Coyotes, and the Edmonton Oilers. From July 2009 to June 2013 he was the goaltending coach for the Anaheim Ducks, a position which had been left vacant following the departure of François Allaire.

== Family ==
Peeters' son Trevor played 36 games as a goaltender in the Western Hockey League for the Red Deer Rebels, Swift Current Broncos, and Saskatoon Blades.

== Awards, records and achievements ==
- Selected to the AHL second All-Star team in 1979.
- Harry "Hap" Holmes Memorial Award in 1979 (shared with Robbie Moore).
- Elizabeth C. Dufresne Trophy winner in 1983.
- Bruins Three Stars Awards: 1983
- Seventh Player Award winner in 1983.
- Selected to the NHL first All-Star team in 1983.
- Vezina Trophy winner in 1983.
- Played in 1980, 1981, 1983, and 1984 NHL All-Star Games.
- Canada Cup winner in 1984.
- Only goalie in NHL history to have two (25+) game unbeaten streaks.
- Only goalie in NHL history to have two (25+) game unbeaten streaks playing on two different teams.
- One of two goalies to have a (30+) game unbeaten streak along with Gerry Cheevers.
- Named One of the Top 100 Best Bruins Players of all Time.

== Career statistics ==
=== Regular season and playoffs ===
Bold indicates led league

			Regular season									Playoffs
Season	Team	League	GP	W	L	T	MIN	GA	SO	GAA	SV%	GP	W	L	MIN	GA	SO	GAA	SV%
1975–76	Medicine Hat Tigers	WCHL	37	16	11	9	2074	147	0	4.25	.877	—	—	—	—	—	—	—	—
1976–77	Medicine Hat Tigers	WCHL	62	26	24	12	3423	232	1	4.07	.877	4	—	—	204	17	0	5.00	—
1977–78	Milwaukee Admirals	IHL	33	12	10	7	1698	92	1	3.25	.919	—	—	—	—	—	—	—	—
1977–78	Maine Mariners	AHL	17	8	2	2	855	40	0	2.80	—	11	8	3	562	25	1	2.67	—
1978–79	Maine Mariners	AHL	35	25	6	3	2067	100	2	2.90	—	6	5	0	329	15	0	2.74	—
1978–79	Philadelphia Flyers	NHL	5	1	2	1	280	16	0	3.43	.867	—	—	—	—	—	—	—	—
1979–80	Philadelphia Flyers	NHL	40	29	5	5	2373	108	1	2.73	.898	13	8	5	779	37	1	2.78	.902
1980–81	Philadelphia Flyers	NHL	40	22	12	5	2333	115	2	2.96	.897	3	2	1	180	12	0	4.00	.815
1981–82	Philadelphia Flyers	NHL	44	23	18	3	2591	160	0	3.71	.871	4	1	2	220	17	0	4.64	.838
1982–83	Boston Bruins	NHL	62	**40**	11	9	3611	142	**8**	**2.37**	.904	**17**	9	**8**	**1024**	**61**	1	3.57	.873
1983–84	Boston Bruins	NHL	50	29	16	2	2868	151	0	3.16	.876	3	0	3	180	10	0	3.33	.853
1984–85	Boston Bruins	NHL	51	19	26	4	2975	172	1	3.47	.868	1	0	1	60	4	0	4.00	.846
1985–86	Boston Bruins	NHL	8	3	4	1	485	31	0	3.84	.873	—	—	—	—	—	—	—	—
1985–86	Washington Capitals	NHL	34	19	11	3	2021	113	1	3.35	.876	9	5	4	544	24	0	2.65	.905
1986–87	Washington Capitals	NHL	37	17	11	4	2002	107	0	3.21	.885	3	1	2	180	9	0	3.00	.882
1986–87	Binghamton Whalers	AHL	4	3	0	1	245	4	1	0.98	.967	—	—	—	—	—	—	—	—
1987–88	Washington Capitals	NHL	35	14	12	4	1896	88	2	**2.78**	.898	12	7	5	654	34	0	3.12	**.896**
1988–89	Washington Capitals	NHL	35	20	7	3	1854	88	4	2.85	.889	6	2	4	359	24	0	4.01	.854
1989–90	Philadelphia Flyers	NHL	24	1	13	5	1140	71	1	3.74	.883	—	—	—	—	—	—	—	—
1990–91	Philadelphia Flyers	NHL	26	9	7	1	1270	61	1	2.88	.902	—	—	—	—	—	—	—	—
1990–91	Hershey Bears	AHL	2	0	1	0	105	11	0	6.29	.833	—	—	—	—	—	—	—	—
NHL totals			489	246	155	51	27,699	1,424	21	3.08	.886	71	35	35	4,200	232	2	3.31	.880

=== International ===
Year	Team	Event	GP	W	L	T	MIN	GA	SO	GAA
1984	Canada	CC	4	3	1	0	234	13	0	3.00

"Peeters' stats". The Goaltender Home Page.

Preceded by Billy Smith	Winner of the Vezina Trophy; 1983	Succeeded by Tom Barrasso
