= 1979–80 AHL season =

American sports season

- League: American Hockey League
- Sport: Ice hockey

Regular season
- F. G. "Teddy" Oke Trophy: New Brunswick Hawks
- Season MVP: Norm Dube
- Top scorer: Norm Dube

Playoffs
- Champions: Hershey Bears
- Runners-up: New Brunswick Hawks

AHL seasons
- 1978–79 1980–81

The 1979–80 AHL season was the 44th season of the American Hockey League. Ten teams were scheduled to play 80 games each. The New Haven Nighthawks finished first overall in the regular season. The Hershey Bears won their sixth Calder Cup championship.

== Team changes ==
- The Adirondack Red Wings join the AHL as an expansion team, based in Glens Falls, New York, playing in the North Division.
- The Philadelphia Firebirds move to Syracuse, New York becoming the Syracuse Firebirds.

== Final standings ==
Note: GP = Games played; W = Wins; L = Losses; T = Ties; GF = Goals for; GA = Goals against; Pts = Points;

North	GP	W	L	T	Pts	GF	GA
New Brunswick Hawks (CHI/TOR)	79	44	27	8	96	325	271
Nova Scotia Voyageurs (MTL)	79	43	29	7	93	331	271
Maine Mariners (PHI)	80	41	28	11	93	307	266
Adirondack Red Wings (DET)	80	32	37	11	75	297	309
Springfield Indians (HFD/LAK)	80	31	37	12	74	292	302

South	GP	W	L	T	Pts	GF	GA
New Haven Nighthawks (CLR/NYR)	80	46	25	9	101	350	305
Hershey Bears (WSH)	80	35	39	6	76	289	273
Syracuse Firebirds (PIT/QUE)	80	31	42	7	69	303	364
Rochester Americans (BUF)	80	28	42	10	66	260	327
Binghamton Dusters (BOS/LAK)	80	24	49	7	55	268	334

== Scoring leaders ==
Note: GP = Games played; G = Goals; A = Assists; Pts = Points; PIM = Penalty minutes

Player	Team	GP	G	A	Pts	PIM
Norm Dube	Nova Scotia Voyageurs	79	40	61	101	49
Keith Acton	Nova Scotia Voyageurs	75	45	53	98	38
Gordie Clark	Maine Mariners	79	47	43	90	64
Bruce Boudreau	New Brunswick	75	36	54	90	47
Bill Lochead	New Haven Nighthawks	68	46	43	89	90
Rick Shinske	Adirondack Red Wings	78	22	58	80	20
Paul Evans	Maine Mariners	80	21	56	77	66
Rick Meagher	Nova Scotia Voyageurs	64	32	44	76	53
Dan Metivier	Nova Scotia Voyageurs	76	35	40	75	29
Gord Brooks	Syracuse Firebirds	77	34	41	75	38

- complete list

== Calder Cup playoffs ==
Division Semifinals
1	New Brunswick	4
4	Adirondack	1
North Division
2	Nova Scotia	2
3	Maine	4
1	New Haven	4
4	Rochester	0
South Division
2	Hershey	4
3	Syracuse	0

Division Finals
1	New Brunswick	4
3	Maine	2
1	New Haven	2
2	Hershey	4

Calder Cup Final
N1	New Brunswick	2
S2	Hershey	4

== Trophy and award winners ==
Team awards

Calder Cup; Playoff champions:	Hershey Bears
F. G. "Teddy" Oke Trophy; Regular Season champions, North Division:	New Brunswick Hawks
John D. Chick Trophy; Regular Season champions, South Division:	New Haven Nighthawks

Individual awards

Les Cunningham Award; Most valuable player:	Norm Dube - Nova Scotia Voyageurs
John B. Sollenberger Trophy; Top point scorer:	Norm Dube - Nova Scotia Voyageurs
Dudley "Red" Garrett Memorial Award; Rookie of the year:	Darryl Sutter - New Brunswick Hawks
Eddie Shore Award; Defenceman of the year:	Rick Vasko - Adirondack Red Wings
Harry "Hap" Holmes Memorial Award; Lowest goals against average:	Rick St. Croix & Robbie Moore - Maine Mariners
Louis A.R. Pieri Memorial Award; Coach of the year:	Doug Gibson - Hershey Bears
Fred T. Hunt Memorial Award; Sportsmanship / Perseverance:	Norm Dube - Nova Scotia Voyageurs

Other awards

James C. Hendy Memorial Award; Most outstanding executive:	Ned Harkness
James H. Ellery Memorial Awards; Outstanding media coverage:	Paul Marslano, New Haven, (newspaper); Bill Brady, Springfield, (radio); Dale Darling, Maine, (television)
Ken McKenzie Award; Outstanding marketing executive:	Bruce Landon, Springfield Indians

== See also ==
- List of AHL seasons

Preceded by 1978–79 AHL season	AHL seasons	Succeeded by 1980–81 AHL season
