= 1978–79 AHL season =

- League: American Hockey League
- Sport: Ice hockey

Regular season
- F. G. "Teddy" Oke Trophy: Maine Mariners
- Season MVP: Rocky Saganiuk
- Top scorer: Bernie Johnston

Playoffs
- Champions: Maine Mariners
- Runners-up: New Haven Nighthawks

AHL seasons
- 1977–78 1979–80

The 1978–79 AHL season was the 43rd season of the American Hockey League. The league inaugurated the Ken McKenzie Award, for the most outstanding marketing executive, showing its commitment to marketing and public relations.

Nine teams were scheduled to play 80 games each. The Maine Mariners repeated as first overall in the regular season, and won their second consecutive Calder Cup championship.

== Team changes ==
- The Hampton Gulls do not resume operations.
- The New Brunswick Hawks join the AHL as an expansion team, based in Moncton, New Brunswick, playing in the North Division.
- The Binghamton Dusters switch divisions from North to South.

== Final standings ==
Note: GP = Games played; W = Wins; L = Losses; T = Ties; GF = Goals for; GA = Goals against; Pts = Points;

North	GP	W	L	T	Pts	GF	GA
Maine Mariners (PHI)	80	45	22	13	103	350	252
New Brunswick Hawks (CHI/TOR)	80	41	29	10	92	315	288
Nova Scotia Voyageurs (MTL)	80	39	37	4	82	313	302
Springfield Indians (LAK)	80	33	38	9	75	289	290

South	GP	W	L	T	Pts	GF	GA
New Haven Nighthawks (NYR)	80	46	25	9	101	346	271
Hershey Bears (BUF/WSH)	79	35	36	8	78	311	324
Binghamton Dusters (PIT)	79	32	42	5	69	300	320
Rochester Americans (BOS)	80	26	42	12	64	289	349
Philadelphia Firebirds (CLR)	80	23	49	8	54	230	347

== Scoring leaders ==
Note: GP = Games played; G = Goals; A = Assists; Pts = Points; PIM = Penalty minutes

Player	Team	GP	G	A	Pts	PIM
Bernie Johnston	Maine Mariners	70	29	66	95	40
Wayne Schaab	Maine Mariners	80	41	50	91	43
Kirk Bowman	New Brunswick Hawks	80	26	56	82	44
Bobby Sheehan	New Haven Nighthawks	70	33	48	81	26
Rick Meagher	Nova Scotia Voyageurs	79	35	46	81	57
Dave Lumley	Nova Scotia Voyageurs	61	22	58	80	160
Claude Noel	Hershey Bears	76	30	50	80	27
Dale Lewis	New Haven Nighthawks	76	29	51	80	20
Rocky Saganiuk	New Brunswick Hawks	61	47	29	76	91
Andre Peloffy	Springfield Indians	77	28	48	76	138

- complete list

== Calder Cup playoffs ==
Division Semifinals
North Division
2	New Brunswick	2
3	Nova Scotia	3
South Division
2	Hershey	1
3	Binghamton	3

Division Finals
1	Maine	4
3	Nova Scotia	2
1	New Haven	4
3	Binghamton	2

Calder Cup Final
N1	Maine	4
S1	New Haven	0

== Trophy and award winners ==
Team awards

Calder Cup; Playoff champions:	Maine Mariners
F. G. "Teddy" Oke Trophy; Regular Season champions, North Division:	Maine Mariners
John D. Chick Trophy; Regular Season champions, South Division:	New Haven Nighthawks

Individual awards

Les Cunningham Award; Most valuable player:	Rocky Saganiuk - New Brunswick Hawks
John B. Sollenberger Trophy; Top point scorer:	Bernie Johnston - Maine Mariners
Dudley "Red" Garrett Memorial Award; Rookie of the year:	Mike Meeker - Binghamton Dusters
Eddie Shore Award; Defenceman of the year:	Terry Murray - Maine Mariners
Harry "Hap" Holmes Memorial Award; Lowest goals against average:	Pete Peeters & Robbie Moore - Maine Mariners
Louis A.R. Pieri Memorial Award; Coach of the year:	Parker MacDonald - New Haven Nighthawks
Fred T. Hunt Memorial Award; Sportsmanship / Perseverance:	Bernie Johnston - Maine Mariners

Other awards

James C. Hendy Memorial Award; Most outstanding executive:	Harry Sinden
James H. Ellery Memorial Awards; Outstanding media coverage:	Eddie St. Pierre, Moncton, (newspaper); Arnie Patterson, Nova Scotia, (radio); Jack O'Neil, Springfield, (television)
Ken McKenzie Award; Outstanding marketing executive:	Roy Mlakar, New Haven Nighthawks

== See also ==
- List of AHL seasons

Preceded by 1977–78 AHL season	AHL seasons	Succeeded by 1979–80 AHL season
