= 1978–79 Montreal Canadiens season =

NHL hockey team season (22nd Championship)

1978–79 Montreal Canadiens
- Stanley Cup champions
- Wales Conference champions
- Norris Division champions
- Division: 1st Norris
- Conference: 1st Wales
- 1978–79 record: 52–17–11
- Home record: 29–6–5
- Road record: 23–11–6
- Goals for: 337
- Goals against: 204

Team information
- General manager: Irving Grundman
- Coach: Scotty Bowman
- Captain: Yvan Cournoyer
- Alternate captains: None
- Arena: Montreal Forum

Team leaders
- Goals: Guy Lafleur (52)
- Assists: Guy Lafleur (77)
- Points: Guy Lafleur (129)
- Penalty minutes: Gilles Lupien (124)
- Plus/minus: Pierre Mondou (+59)
- Wins: Ken Dryden (30)
- Goals against average: Ken Dryden (2.30)

The 1978–79 Montreal Canadiens season was the club's 70th season. The franchise won 52 games and had 11 ties for a total of 115 points, but they finished second overall in the league as the New York Islanders finished first overall by one point. The Canadiens won the Stanley Cup for the fourth consecutive time, the 15th time in the past 24 seasons, and their 22nd overall. The Canadiens won the Stanley Cup on home ice for the first time since 1968.

== Regular season ==
=== Season standings ===
Norris Division
	GP	W	L	T	GF	GA	Pts
**Montreal Canadiens**	80	52	17	11	337	204	115
**Pittsburgh Penguins**	80	36	31	13	281	279	85
**Los Angeles Kings**	80	34	34	12	292	286	80
Washington Capitals	80	24	41	15	273	338	63
Detroit Red Wings	80	23	41	16	252	295	62

Note: W = Wins, L = Losses, T = Ties, GF = Goals For, GA = Goals Against, Pts = Points
Teams that qualified for the playoffs are highlighted in bold.

=== Record vs. opponents ===
Norris Division record vs. opponents

**Vs. Wales Conference**

**Vs. Campbell Conference**

**Vs. Norris Division**

1978–79 NHL records
Team	**DET**	**LAK**	**MTL**	**PIT**	**WSH**	**Total**
Detroit	—	1–5–2	2–4–2	3–5	3–2–3	**9–16–7**
Los Angeles	5–1–2	—	3–3–2	3–4–1	3–4–1	**14–12–6**
Montreal	4–2–2	3–3–2	—	5–2–1	7–0–1	**19–7–6**
Pittsburgh	5–3	4–3–1	2–5–1	—	4–3–1	**15–14–3**
Washington	2–3–3	4–3–1	0–7–1	3–4–1	—	**9–17–6**

**Vs. Adams Division**

1978–79 NHL records
Team	**BOS**	**BUF**	**MIN**	**TOR**	**Total**
Detroit	1–3	1–3	1–2–1	2–2	**5–10–1**
Los Angeles	3–1	1–2–1	3–1	0–4	**7–8–1**
Montreal	2–0–2	4–0	3–1	3–0–1	**12–1–3**
Pittsburgh	2–1–1	2–0–2	3–1	1–3	**8–5–3**
Washington	0–3–1	0–3–1	2–2	1–1–2	**3–9–4**

**Vs. Patrick Division**

1978–79 NHL records
Team	**ATL**	**NYI**	**NYR**	**PHI**	**Total**
Detroit	0–3–1	0–3–1	1–1–2	0–2–2	**1–9–6**
Los Angeles	2–2	0–2–2	1–3	0–4	**3–11–2**
Montreal	3–1	1–3	1–3	3–0–1	**8–7–1**
Pittsburgh	0–3–1	0–1–3	2–2	1–3	**3–9–4**
Washington	1–2–1	1–3	1–1–2	0–3–1	**3–9–4**

**Vs. Smythe Division**

1978–79 NHL records
Team	**CHI**	**COL**	**STL**	**VAN**	**Total**
Detroit	3–0–1	3–0–1	1–3	1–3	**8–6–2**
Los Angeles	3–1	2–0–2	2–1–1	3–1	**10–3–3**
Montreal	2–2	4–0	4–0	3–0–1	**13–2–1**
Pittsburgh	2–0–2	3–1	2–1–1	3–1	**10–3–3**
Washington	1–2–1	3–1	2–2	3–1	**9–6–1**

== Schedule and results ==
1978–79 regular season
October

Game	Result	Date	Score	Opponent	Record
1	W	October 11, 1978	5–2	Minnesota North Stars (1978–79)	1–0–0
2	W	October 14, 1978	5–2	Colorado Rockies (1978–79)	2–0–0
3	W	October 15, 1978	3–2	@ Philadelphia Flyers (1978–79)	3–0–0
4	L	October 17, 1978	1–3	@ New York Islanders (1978–79)	3–1–0
5	L	October 20, 1978	5–7	@ Atlanta Flames (1978–79)	3–2–0
6	W	October 22, 1978	8–4	Los Angeles Kings (1978–79)	4–2–0
7	T	October 25, 1978	4–4	@ Toronto Maple Leafs (1978–79)	4–2–1
8	L	October 28, 1978	1–2	New York Rangers (1978–79)	4–3–1
9	L	October 29, 1978	1–4	@ Chicago Black Hawks (1978–79)	4–4–1

November

Game	Result	Date	Score	Opponent	Record
10	W	November 1, 1978	4–1	@ Detroit Red Wings (1978–79)	5–4–1
11	W	November 2, 1978	4–2	Washington Capitals (1978–79)	6–4–1
12	W	November 4, 1978	4–2	Atlanta Flames (1978–79)	7–4–1
13	T	November 5, 1978	1–1	@ Boston Bruins (1978–79)	7–4–2
14	W	November 8, 1978	6–0	@ Washington Capitals (1978–79)	8–4–2
15	W	November 9, 1978	8–3	Detroit Red Wings (1978–79)	9–4–2
16	W	November 11, 1978	3–2	Toronto Maple Leafs (1978–79)	10–4–2
17	W	November 15, 1978	6–1	@ Colorado Rockies (1978–79)	11–4–2
18	L	November 16, 1978	3–6	@ Los Angeles Kings (1978–79)	11–5–2
19	W	November 18, 1978	4–2	@ Vancouver Canucks (1978–79)	12–5–2
20	W	November 22, 1978	3–2	@ Pittsburgh Penguins (1978–79)	13–5–2
21	W	November 23, 1978	8–4	Pittsburgh Penguins (1978–79)	14–5–2
22	L	November 25, 1978	3–8	Chicago Black Hawks (1978–79)	14–6–2
23	W	November 28, 1978	3–0	Philadelphia Flyers (1978–79)	15–6–2

December

Game	Result	Date	Score	Opponent	Record
24	W	December 2, 1978	8–1	Buffalo Sabres (1978–79)	16–6–2
25	W	December 3, 1978	4–1	@ Buffalo Sabres (1978–79)	17–6–2
26	T	December 6, 1978	2–2	@ Detroit Red Wings (1978–79)	17–6–3
27	T	December 8, 1978	3–3	Pittsburgh Penguins (1978–79)	17–6–4
28	W	December 10, 1978	4–3	New York Islanders (1978–79)	18–6–4
29	W	December 12, 1978	6–0	@ St. Louis Blues (1978–79)	19–6–4
30	W	December 13, 1978	3–2	@ Minnesota North Stars (1978–79)	20–6–4
31	W	December 16, 1978	5–2	@ Los Angeles Kings (1978–79)	21–6–4
32	W	December 20, 1978	5–3	@ Chicago Black Hawks (1978–79)	22–6–4
33	W	December 21, 1978	5–1	Chicago Black Hawks (1978–79)	23–6–4
34	W	December 23, 1978	3–2	Colorado Rockies (1978–79)	24–6–4
35	W	December 27, 1978	5–2	@ Detroit Red Wings (1978–79)	25–6–4
36	T	December 28, 1978	3–3	Los Angeles Kings (1978–79)	25–6–5
37	W	December 30, 1978	6–1	Boston Bruins (1978–79)	26–6–5

January

Game	Result	Date	Score	Opponent	Record
38	L	January 3, 1979	2–6	@ New York Rangers (1978–79)	26–7–5
39	L	January 4, 1979	4–5	Los Angeles Kings (1978–79)	26–8–5
40	W	January 6, 1979	2–0	Vancouver Canucks (1978–79)	27–8–5
41	W	January 8, 1979	3–1	Minnesota North Stars (1978–79)	28–8–5
42	L	January 10, 1979	2–3	@ Pittsburgh Penguins (1978–79)	28–9–5
43	W	January 13, 1979	5–2	Buffalo Sabres (1978–79)	29–9–5
44	T	January 16, 1979	2–2	@ Vancouver Canucks (1978–79)	29–9–6
45	W	January 17, 1979	7–3	@ Los Angeles Kings (1978–79)	30–9–6
46	T	January 20, 1979	5–5	Philadelphia Flyers (1978–79)	30–9–7
47	W	January 23, 1979	6–3	@ St. Louis Blues (1978–79)	31–9–7
48	W	January 25, 1979	6–0	Atlanta Flames (1978–79)	32–9–7
49	W	January 27, 1979	3–1	Boston Bruins (1978–79)	33–9–7
50	W	January 29, 1979	7–3	@ Philadelphia Flyers (1978–79)	34–9–7
51	W	January 31, 1979	4–1	@ Pittsburgh Penguins (1978–79)	35–9–7

February

Game	Result	Date	Score	Opponent	Record
52	W	February 3, 1979	6–3	@ Toronto Maple Leafs (1978–79)	36–9–7
53	W	February 4, 1979	8–4	@ Washington Capitals (1978–79)	37–9–7
54	T	February 15, 1979	2–2	Los Angeles Kings (1978–79)	37–9–8
55	W	February 17, 1979	2–0	Washington Capitals (1978–79)	38–9–8
56	W	February 18, 1979	5–2	@ Buffalo Sabres (1978–79)	39–9–8
57	L	February 21, 1979	1–3	@ Pittsburgh Penguins (1978–79)	39–10–8
58	W	February 22, 1979	12–0	Pittsburgh Penguins (1978–79)	40–10–8
59	W	February 24, 1979	6–4	St. Louis Blues (1978–79)	41–10–8
60	W	February 25, 1979	8–5	@ Washington Capitals (1978–79)	42–10–8
61	L	February 27, 1979	3–7	@ New York Islanders (1978–79)	42–11–8

March

Game	Result	Date	Score	Opponent	Record
62	W	March 1, 1979	2–1	Toronto Maple Leafs (1978–79)	43–11–8
63	L	March 3, 1979	3–5	Detroit Red Wings (1978–79)	43–12–8
64	T	March 5, 1979	2–2	@ Washington Capitals (1978–79)	43–12–9
65	W	March 8, 1979	11–1	Vancouver Canucks (1978–79)	44–12–9
66	L	March 10, 1979	3–6	New York Rangers (1978–79)	44–13–9
67	T	March 12, 1979	3–3	Detroit Red Wings (1978–79)	44–13–10
68	L	March 14, 1979	3–4	@ Minnesota North Stars (1978–79)	44–14–10
69	L	March 17, 1979	1–3	@ Los Angeles Kings (1978–79)	44–15–10
70	W	March 18, 1979	3–1	@ Colorado Rockies (1978–79)	45–15–10
71	L	March 22, 1979	3–5	New York Islanders (1978–79)	45–16–10
72	W	March 24, 1979	3–1	Washington Capitals (1978–79)	46–16–10
73	W	March 25, 1979	1–0	@ New York Rangers (1978–79)	47–16–10
74	W	March 27, 1979	6–4	@ Atlanta Flames (1978–79)	48–16–10
75	W	March 29, 1979	5–2	St. Louis Blues (1978–79)	49–16–10
76	W	March 31, 1979	5–3	Pittsburgh Penguins (1978–79)	50–16–10

April

Game	Result	Date	Score	Opponent	Record
77	T	April 1, 1979	3–3	@ Boston Bruins (1978–79)	50–16–11
78	W	April 4, 1979	4–1	Detroit Red Wings (1978–79)	51–16–11
79	W	April 7, 1979	10–3	Washington Capitals (1978–79)	52–16–11
80	L	April 8, 1979	0–1	@ Detroit Red Wings (1978–79)	52–17–11

Legend: Win (2 points) Loss (0 points) Tie (1 point)

== Playoffs ==
1979 Stanley Cup playoffs
Quarterfinals vs. Toronto Maple Leafs (4–0)

#	Date	Opponent	Score	Location/Attendance	Series
1	April 16	Maple Leafs	5–2	Montreal Forum	MTL 1–0
2	April 18	Maple Leafs	5–1	Montreal Forum	MTL 2–0
3	April 21	@Maple Leafs	4–3 (2OT)	Maple Leaf Gardens	MTL 3–0
4	April 22	@Maple Leafs	5–4 (OT)	Maple Leaf Gardens	MTL 4–0

Semifinals vs. Boston Bruins (4–3)

#	Date	Opponent	Score	Location/Attendance	Series
1	April 26	Bruins	4–2	Montreal Forum	MTL 1–0
2	April 28	Bruins	5–2	Montreal Forum	MTL 2–0
3	May 1	@Bruins	1–2	Boston Garden	MTL 2–1
4	May 3	@Bruins	3–4	Boston Garden	Tie 2–2
5	May 5	Bruins	5–1	Montreal Forum	MTL 3–2
6	May 8	@Bruins	2–5	Boston Garden	Tie 3–3
7	May 10	Bruins	5–4 (OT)	Montreal Forum	MTL 4–3

Stanley Cup Final vs. New York Rangers (4–1)

#	Date	Opponent	Score	Location/Attendance	Series
1	May 13	Rangers	1–4	Montreal Forum	NYR 1–0
2	May 15	Rangers	6–2	Montreal Forum	Tie 1–1
3	May 17	@Rangers	4–1	Madison Square Garden	MTL 2–1
4	May 19	@Rangers	4–3 (OT)	Madison Square Garden	MTL 3–1
5	May 21	Rangers	4–1	Montreal Forum	MTL 4–1

Legend: Win Loss

== Player statistics ==
=== Regular season ===
==== Scoring ====
Player	Pos	GP	G	A	Pts	PIM	+/-	PPG	SHG	GWG
Guy Lafleur	RW	80	52	77	129	28	56	13	0	12
Steve Shutt	LW	72	37	40	77	31	37	10	0	6
Pierre Mondou	C	77	31	41	72	26	59	6	1	7
Yvon Lambert	LW	79	26	40	66	26	30	5	1	7
Larry Robinson	D	67	16	45	61	33	50	4	0	1
Mario Tremblay	RW	76	30	29	59	74	23	3	0	4
Jacques Lemaire	C	50	24	31	55	10	9	6	1	4
Guy Lapointe	D	69	13	42	55	43	27	6	0	1
Rejean Houle	W	66	17	34	51	43	16	6	0	4
Bob Gainey	LW	79	20	18	38	44	11	1	1	1
Serge Savard	D	80	7	26	33	30	46	1	2	0
Mark Napier	RW	54	11	20	31	11	17	2	0	0
Doug Risebrough	C	48	10	15	25	62	22	0	0	2
Doug Jarvis	C	80	10	13	23	16	5	0	1	1
Pierre Larouche	C	36	9	13	22	4	3	4	0	0
Pat Hughes	RW	41	9	8	17	22	7	1	0	1
Rick Chartraw	D/RW	62	5	11	16	29	14	0	0	1
Brian Engblom	D	62	3	11	14	60	21	0	0	0
Gilles Lupien	D	72	1	9	10	124	33	0	0	0
Rod Langway	D	45	3	4	7	30	5	0	0	0
Yvan Cournoyer	RW	15	2	5	7	2	5	0	0	0
Cam Connor	RW	23	1	3	4	39	2	0	0	0
Ken Dryden	G	47	0	3	3	4	0	0	0	0
Michel Larocque	G	34	0	3	3	2	0	0	0	0
Dan Newman	LW	16	0	2	2	4	-1	0	0	0
Dave Lumley	RW	3	0	0	0	0	0	0	0	0

==== Goaltending ====
Player	MIN	GP	W	L	T	GA	GAA	SO
Ken Dryden	2814	47	30	10	7	108	2.30	5
Michel Larocque	1986	34	22	7	4	94	2.84	3
Team:	4800	80	52	17	11	202	2.52	8

=== Playoffs ===
==== Scoring ====
Player	Pos	GP	G	A	Pts	PIM	PPG	SHG	GWG
Jacques Lemaire	C	16	11	12	23	6	6	0	2
Guy Lafleur	RW	16	10	13	23	0	2	0	2
Bob Gainey	LW	16	6	10	16	10	0	0	1
Larry Robinson	D	16	6	9	15	8	1	0	1
Yvon Lambert	LW	16	5	6	11	16	2	0	1
Steve Shutt	LW	11	4	7	11	6	1	0	0
Pierre Mondou	C	16	3	6	9	4	1	0	0
Serge Savard	D	16	2	7	9	6	1	0	1
Guy Lapointe	D	10	2	6	8	10	1	0	0
Mario Tremblay	RW	13	3	4	7	13	0	0	1
Doug Risebrough	C	15	1	6	7	32	0	0	1
Rejean Houle	W	7	1	5	6	2	0	0	0
Mark Napier	RW	12	3	2	5	2	0	0	0
Doug Jarvis	C	12	1	3	4	4	0	0	0
Pierre Larouche	C	6	1	3	4	0	0	0	1
Rick Chartraw	D/RW	16	2	1	3	24	0	0	0
Pat Hughes	RW	8	1	2	3	4	0	0	0
Ken Dryden	G	16	0	3	3	2	0	0	0
Cam Connor	RW	8	1	0	1	0	0	0	1
Brian Engblom	D	16	0	1	1	11	0	0	0
Rod Langway	D	8	0	0	0	16	0	0	0
Michel Larocque	G	1	0	0	0	0	0	0	0
Gilles Lupien	D	13	0	0	0	2	0	0	0

==== Goaltending ====
Player	MIN	GP	W	L	GA	GAA	SO
Ken Dryden	990	16	12	4	41	2.48	0
Michel Larocque	20	1	0	0	0	0.00	0
Team:	1010	16	12	4	41	2.44	0

Note:

Pos = Position;GP = Games played; G = Goals; A = Assists; Pts = Points; PIM = Penalty minutes; +/- = Plus/minus; PPG = Power-play goals; SHG = Short-handed goals; GWG = Game-winning goals
Pos = Position;GP = Games played; Min, TOI = Minutes played; W = Wins; L = Losses; T,T/OT = Ties; OTL = Overtime losses; GA = Goals-against; GAA = Goals-against average; SO = Shutouts; SA = Shots against; SV = Shots saved;SV% = Save percentage;

== Awards and records ==
- Prince of Wales Trophy
- Ken Dryden and Michel Larocque, Vezina Trophy
- Bob Gainey, Conn Smythe Trophy
- Bob Gainey, Selke Trophy
- Serge Savard, Bill Masterton Memorial Trophy

== Draft picks ==
Montreal's draft picks at the 1978 NHL amateur draft held at the Queen Elizabeth Hotel in Montreal.

Round	#	Player	Nationality	College/Junior/Club team (League)
1	8	Dan Geoffrion	Canada	Cornwall Royals (QMJHL)
1	17	Dave Hunter	Canada	Sudbury Wolves (OMJHL)
2	30	Dale Yakiwchuk	Canada	Portland Winterhawks (WCHL)
2	36	Ron Carter	Canada	Sherbrooke Castors (QMJHL)
3	42	Richard David	Canada	Trois-Rivières Draveurs (QMJHL)
4	69	Kevin Reeves	Canada	Montreal Juniors (QMJHL)
5	86	Mike Boyd	Canada	Sault Ste. Marie Greyhounds (OMJHL)
6	103	Keith Acton	Canada	Peterborough Petes (OMJHL)
7	120	Jim Lawson	Canada	Brown University (ECAC)
8	137	Larry Landon	Canada	Rensselaer Polytechnic Institute (ECAC)
9	154	Kevin Constantine	United States	Rensselaer Polytechnic Institute (ECAC)
10	171	John Swan	Canada	McGill University (CIAU)
11	186	Daniel Metivier	Canada	Hull Olympiques (QMJHL)
12	201	Viacheslav Fetisov	Soviet Union	CSKA Moscow (Russia)
13	212	Jeff Mars	United States	University of Michigan (WCHA)
14	222	Greg Tignanelli	United States	Northern Michigan University (CCHA)
15	225	George Goulakos	Canada	St. Lawrence University (ECAC)
16	227	Ken Moodie	Canada	Colgate University (ECAC)
17	229	Serge LeBlanc	Canada	University of Vermont (ECAC)
18	230	Bob Magnuson	United States	Merrimack College (ECAC)
19	231	Chris Nilan	United States	Northeastern University (ECAC)
20	232	Rick Wilson	Canada	St. Lawrence University (ECAC)
21	233	Louis Sleigher	Canada	Chicoutimi Saguenéens (QMJHL)
22	234	Doug Robb	Canada	Billings Bighorns (WCHL)

== See also ==
- 1978–79 NHL season
- 1979 Stanley Cup Final
- The Game

Preceded by Montreal Canadiens; 1978	Montreal Canadiens; Stanley Cup Champions; 1979	Succeeded by New York Islanders; 1980
