= 1978–79 Washington Capitals season =

NHL hockey team season

1978–79 Washington Capitals
- Division: 4th Norris
- Conference: 8th Campbell
- 1978–79 record: 24–41–15
- Home record: 15–19–6
- Road record: 9–22–9
- Goals for: 273
- Goals against: 338

Team information
- General manager: Max McNab
- Coach: Danny Belisle
- Captain: Guy Charron
- Alternate captains: None
- Arena: Capital Centre

Team leaders
- Goals: Dennis Maruk; Tom Rowe (31)
- Assists: Dennis Maruk (59)
- Points: Dennis Maruk (90)
- Penalty minutes: Gord Lane (147)
- Plus/minus: Rolf Edberg (+12)
- Wins: Gary Inness (14)
- Goals against average: Gary Inness (3.71)

The 1978–79 Washington Capitals season was the Washington Capitals fifth season in the National Hockey League (NHL). The Capitals failed to make the playoffs for the fifth straight year for the first time in franchise history.

== Regular season ==
=== Final standings ===
Norris Division
	GP	W	L	T	GF	GA	Pts
**Montreal Canadiens**	80	52	17	11	337	204	115
**Pittsburgh Penguins**	80	36	31	13	281	279	85
**Los Angeles Kings**	80	34	34	12	292	286	80
Washington Capitals	80	24	41	15	273	338	63
Detroit Red Wings	80	23	41	16	252	295	62

Note: W = Wins, L = Losses, T = Ties, GF = Goals For, GA = Goals Against, Pts = Points
Teams that qualified for the playoffs are highlighted in bold.

=== Record vs. opponents ===
Norris Division record vs. opponents

**Vs. Wales Conference**

**Vs. Campbell Conference**

**Vs. Norris Division**

1978–79 NHL records
Team	**DET**	**LAK**	**MTL**	**PIT**	**WSH**	**Total**
Detroit	—	1–5–2	2–4–2	3–5	3–2–3	**9–16–7**
Los Angeles	5–1–2	—	3–3–2	3–4–1	3–4–1	**14–12–6**
Montreal	4–2–2	3–3–2	—	5–2–1	7–0–1	**19–7–6**
Pittsburgh	5–3	4–3–1	2–5–1	—	4–3–1	**15–14–3**
Washington	2–3–3	4–3–1	0–7–1	3–4–1	—	**9–17–6**

**Vs. Adams Division**

1978–79 NHL records
Team	**BOS**	**BUF**	**MIN**	**TOR**	**Total**
Detroit	1–3	1–3	1–2–1	2–2	**5–10–1**
Los Angeles	3–1	1–2–1	3–1	0–4	**7–8–1**
Montreal	2–0–2	4–0	3–1	3–0–1	**12–1–3**
Pittsburgh	2–1–1	2–0–2	3–1	1–3	**8–5–3**
Washington	0–3–1	0–3–1	2–2	1–1–2	**3–9–4**

**Vs. Patrick Division**

1978–79 NHL records
Team	**ATL**	**NYI**	**NYR**	**PHI**	**Total**
Detroit	0–3–1	0–3–1	1–1–2	0–2–2	**1–9–6**
Los Angeles	2–2	0–2–2	1–3	0–4	**3–11–2**
Montreal	3–1	1–3	1–3	3–0–1	**8–7–1**
Pittsburgh	0–3–1	0–1–3	2–2	1–3	**3–9–4**
Washington	1–2–1	1–3	1–1–2	0–3–1	**3–9–4**

**Vs. Smythe Division**

1978–79 NHL records
Team	**CHI**	**COL**	**STL**	**VAN**	**Total**
Detroit	3–0–1	3–0–1	1–3	1–3	**8–6–2**
Los Angeles	3–1	2–0–2	2–1–1	3–1	**10–3–3**
Montreal	2–2	4–0	4–0	3–0–1	**13–2–1**
Pittsburgh	2–0–2	3–1	2–1–1	3–1	**10–3–3**
Washington	1–2–1	3–1	2–2	3–1	**9–6–1**

== Schedule and results ==
1978–79 regular season
October

Game	Result	Date	Score	Opponent	Record
1	W	October 11, 1978	4–2	@ Los Angeles Kings (1978–79)	1–0–0
2	T	October 13, 1978	3–3	@ Atlanta Flames (1978–79)	1–0–1
3	L	October 14, 1978	3–6	Atlanta Flames (1978–79)	1–1–1
4	L	October 18, 1978	2–4	Chicago Black Hawks (1978–79)	1–2–1
5	L	October 20, 1978	4–6	Los Angeles Kings (1978–79)	1–3–1
6	L	October 21, 1978	1–5	@ Pittsburgh Penguins (1978–79)	1–4–1
7	T	October 25, 1978	2–2	@ Chicago Black Hawks (1978–79)	1–4–2
8	L	October 28, 1978	1–5	@ Los Angeles Kings (1978–79)	1–5–2

November

Game	Result	Date	Score	Opponent	Record
9	W	November 1, 1978	6–4	Pittsburgh Penguins (1978–79)	2–5–2
10	L	November 2, 1978	2–4	@ Montreal Canadiens (1978–79)	2–6–2
11	L	November 4, 1978	1–4	@ New York Islanders (1978–79)	2–7–2
12	T	November 5, 1978	3–3	Detroit Red Wings (1978–79)	2–7–3
13	L	November 8, 1978	0–6	Montreal Canadiens (1978–79)	2–8–3
14	L	November 9, 1978	2–6	@ Boston Bruins (1978–79)	2–9–3
15	L	November 11, 1978	0–2	Buffalo Sabres (1978–79)	2–10–3
16	W	November 14, 1978	8–7	Atlanta Flames (1978–79)	3–10–3
17	W	November 15, 1978	3–2	@ Minnesota North Stars (1978–79)	4–10–3
18	L	November 17, 1978	2–4	New York Islanders (1978–79)	4–11–3
19	W	November 21, 1978	4–3	@ St. Louis Blues (1978–79)	5–11–3
20	L	November 22, 1978	1–3	St. Louis Blues (1978–79)	5–12–3
21	T	November 25, 1978	5–5	Boston Bruins (1978–79)	5–12–4
22	L	November 26, 1978	4–9	@ New York Rangers (1978–79)	5–13–4
23	L	November 29, 1978	3–5	@ Pittsburgh Penguins (1978–79)	5–14–4

December

Game	Result	Date	Score	Opponent	Record
24	L	December 1, 1978	4–7	Pittsburgh Penguins (1978–79)	5–15–4
25	L	December 2, 1978	2–5	@ St. Louis Blues (1978–79)	5–16–4
26	L	December 4, 1978	2–10	@ Los Angeles Kings (1978–79)	5–17–4
27	W	December 5, 1978	4–1	@ Colorado Rockies (1978–79)	6–17–4
28	W	December 9, 1978	7–5	@ Vancouver Canucks (1978–79)	7–17–4
29	L	December 12, 1978	3–4	Colorado Rockies (1978–79)	7–18–4
30	L	December 14, 1978	2–5	@ Boston Bruins (1978–79)	7–19–4
31	L	December 15, 1978	1–6	Minnesota North Stars (1978–79)	7–20–4
32	W	December 17, 1978	7–6	Toronto Maple Leafs (1978–79)	8–20–4
33	T	December 19, 1978	4–4	Philadelphia Flyers (1978–79)	8–20–5
34	L	December 21, 1978	2–5	@ Philadelphia Flyers (1978–79)	8–21–5
35	T	December 23, 1978	2–2	@ Detroit Red Wings (1978–79)	8–21–6
36	L	December 27, 1978	1–6	@ Minnesota North Stars (1978–79)	8–22–6
37	T	December 30, 1978	5–5	@ Toronto Maple Leafs (1978–79)	8–22–7

January

Game	Result	Date	Score	Opponent	Record
38	W	January 3, 1979	8–3	Los Angeles Kings (1978–79)	9–22–7
39	W	January 6, 1979	4–1	@ Detroit Red Wings (1978–79)	10–22–7
40	L	January 7, 1979	3–5	@ Chicago Black Hawks (1978–79)	10–23–7
41	L	January 9, 1979	2–5	Philadelphia Flyers (1978–79)	10–24–7
42	L	January 11, 1979	2–6	@ Buffalo Sabres (1978–79)	10–25–7
43	W	January 12, 1979	8–1	Colorado Rockies (1978–79)	11–25–7
44	W	January 14, 1979	5–3	Vancouver Canucks (1978–79)	12–25–7
45	L	January 16, 1979	2–6	@ New York Islanders (1978–79)	12–26–7
46	W	January 19, 1979	5–1	Detroit Red Wings (1978–79)	13–26–7
47	W	January 20, 1979	5–2	@ Pittsburgh Penguins (1978–79)	14–26–7
48	W	January 24, 1979	5–1	New York Rangers (1978–79)	15–26–7
49	W	January 27, 1979	4–1	Chicago Black Hawks (1978–79)	16–26–7
50	T	January 28, 1979	2–2	Toronto Maple Leafs (1978–79)	16–26–8
51	L	January 30, 1979	4–7	@ Detroit Red Wings (1978–79)	16–27–8
52	W	January 31, 1979	5–3	Los Angeles Kings (1978–79)	17–27–8

February

Game	Result	Date	Score	Opponent	Record
53	L	February 3, 1979	1–5	Vancouver Canucks (1978–79)	17–28–8
54	L	February 4, 1979	4–8	Montreal Canadiens (1978–79)	17–29–8
55	W	February 15, 1979	9–3	@ Colorado Rockies (1978–79)	18–29–8
56	L	February 17, 1979	0–2	@ Montreal Canadiens (1978–79)	18–30–8
57	T	February 18, 1979	6–6	@ New York Rangers (1978–79)	18–30–9
58	L	February 20, 1979	3–5	@ Atlanta Flames (1978–79)	18–31–9
59	L	February 21, 1979	3–4	Detroit Red Wings (1978–79)	18–32–9
60	L	February 24, 1979	4–6	Buffalo Sabres (1978–79)	18–33–9
61	L	February 25, 1979	5–8	Montreal Canadiens (1978–79)	18–34–9
62	T	February 28, 1979	3–3	@ Los Angeles Kings (1978–79)	18–34–10

March

Game	Result	Date	Score	Opponent	Record
63	W	March 2, 1979	6–2	@ Vancouver Canucks (1978–79)	19–34–10
64	W	March 4, 1979	5–4	Minnesota North Stars (1978–79)	20–34–10
65	T	March 5, 1979	2–2	Montreal Canadiens (1978–79)	20–34–11
66	W	March 10, 1979	7–5	St. Louis Blues (1978–79)	21–34–11
67	T	March 11, 1979	3–3	@ Detroit Red Wings (1978–79)	21–34–12
68	L	March 14, 1979	1–4	Detroit Red Wings (1978–79)	21–35–12
69	L	March 17, 1979	2–5	Pittsburgh Penguins (1978–79)	21–36–12
70	T	March 18, 1979	3–3	@ Buffalo Sabres (1978–79)	21–36–13
71	T	March 20, 1979	2–2	New York Rangers (1978–79)	21–36–14
72	T	March 21, 1979	2–2	@ Pittsburgh Penguins (1978–79)	21–36–15
73	L	March 24, 1979	1–3	@ Montreal Canadiens (1978–79)	21–37–15
74	L	March 25, 1979	4–7	@ Philadelphia Flyers (1978–79)	21–38–15
75	L	March 28, 1979	2–6	@ Toronto Maple Leafs (1978–79)	21–39–15
76	L	March 31, 1979	1–4	Boston Bruins (1978–79)	21–40–15

April

Game	Result	Date	Score	Opponent	Record
77	W	April 1, 1979	6–4	New York Islanders (1978–79)	22–40–15
78	W	April 3, 1979	6–2	Los Angeles Kings (1978–79)	23–40–15
79	L	April 7, 1979	3–10	@ Montreal Canadiens (1978–79)	23–41–15
80	W	April 8, 1979	5–2	Pittsburgh Penguins (1978–79)	24–41–15

Legend: Win (2 points) Loss (0 points) Tie (1 point)

== Player statistics ==
=== Regular season ===
Scoring

Player	Pos	GP	G	A	Pts	PIM	+/-	PPG	SHG	GWG
Dennis Maruk	C	76	31	59	90	71	-14	6	2	3
Guy Charron	C	80	28	42	70	24	-14	9	0	4
Robert Picard	D	77	21	44	65	85	3	8	0	2
Tom Rowe	RW	69	31	30	61	137	-6	4	0	4
Ryan Walter	C/LW	69	28	28	56	70	-1	6	0	1
Bob Sirois	RW	73	29	25	54	6	-6	9	0	3
Rolf Edberg	C	76	14	27	41	6	11	1	0	2
Rick Green	D	71	8	33	41	62	-45	2	1	0
Leif Svensson	D	74	2	29	31	28	-3	0	0	0
Bob Girard	LW	79	9	15	24	36	-15	0	0	0
Mark Lofthouse	RW/C	52	13	10	23	10	-11	1	0	0
Blair Stewart	C	45	7	12	19	48	1	0	0	0
Greg Polis	LW	19	12	6	18	6	3	6	0	1
Gord Lane	D	64	3	15	18	147	-15	0	0	0
Yvon Labre	D	51	1	13	14	80	7	0	0	0
Michel Bergeron	RW	30	7	6	13	7	-18	1	0	1
Paul Mulvey	LW	55	7	4	11	81	-18	1	0	1
Greg Carroll	C	24	5	6	11	12	-2	0	0	0
Dennis Hextall	LW	26	2	9	11	43	-13	0	0	0
Peter Scamurra	D	30	3	5	8	12	-13	0	1	0
Jack Lynch	D	30	2	6	8	14	2	1	0	0
Gary Rissling	LW	26	3	3	6	127	-5	1	0	1
Gerry Meehan	C	18	2	4	6	0	-3	1	0	1
Bill Riley	RW	24	2	2	4	64	-6	0	0	0
Ron Lalonde	C	18	1	3	4	4	-1	0	1	0
Eddy Godin	RW	9	0	3	3	6	-2	0	0	0
Craig Patrick	RW	3	1	1	2	0	-1	0	0	0
Chuck Arnason	RW	13	0	2	2	4	-1	0	0	0
Gary Inness	G	37	0	2	2	6	0	0	0	0
Doug Patey	RW	6	1	0	1	2	-2	0	0	0
Dave Forbes	LW	2	0	1	1	2	0	0	0	0
Gord Smith	D	39	0	1	1	22	-7	0	0	0
Bryan Watson	D	20	0	1	1	36	-7	0	0	0
Jim Bedard	G	30	0	0	0	6	0	0	0	0
Pierre Bouchard	D	1	0	0	0	0	1	0	0	0
Rollie Boutin	G	2	0	0	0	0	0	0	0	0
Rick Bragnalo	C	2	0	0	0	0	-1	0	0	0
Nelson Burton	LW	3	0	0	0	13	-2	0	0	0
Mike Marson	LW	4	0	0	0	0	-3	0	0	0
Brent Tremblay	D	1	0	0	0	0	0	0	0	0
Bernie Wolfe	G	18	0	0	0	15	0	0	0	0

Goaltending

Player	MIN	GP	W	L	T	GA	GAA	SO
Gary Inness	2107	37	14	14	8	130	3.70	0
Jim Bedard	1740	30	6	17	6	126	4.34	0
Bernie Wolfe	863	18	4	9	1	68	4.73	0
Rollie Boutin	90	2	0	1	0	10	6.67	0
Team:	4800	80	24	41	15	334	4.17	0

Note: GP = Games played; G = Goals; A = Assists; Pts = Points; +/- = Plus/minus; PIM = Penalty minutes; PPG=Power-play goals; SHG=Short-handed goals; GWG=Game-winning goals
MIN=Minutes played; W = Wins; L = Losses; T = Ties; GA = Goals against; GAA = Goals against average; SO = Shutouts;

== Draft picks ==
Washington's draft picks at the 1978 NHL amateur draft held at the Queen Elizabeth Hotel in Montreal.

Round	#	Player	Nationality	College/Junior/Club team (League)
1	2	Ryan Walter	Canada	Seattle Breakers (WCHL)
1	18	Tim Coulis	Canada	Hamilton Fincups (OMJHL)
2	20	Paul Mulvey	Canada	Portland Winterhawks (WCHL)
2	23	Paul MacKinnon	Canada	Peterborough Petes (OMJHL)
3	38	Glen Currie	Canada	Laval National (QMJHL)
3	45	Jay Johnston	Canada	Hamilton Fincups (OMJHL)
4	55	Bengt-Ake Gustafsson	Sweden	Färjestad BK Karlstad (SEL)
5	71	Lou Franceschetti	Canada	Niagara Falls Flyers (OMJHL)
6	88	Vince Magnan	Canada	University of Denver (WCHA)
7	105	Mats Hallin	Sweden	Södertälje SK (Sweden)
8	122	Rich Sirois	Canada	Milwaukee Admirals (IHL)
9	139	Denis Pomerleau	Canada	Trois-Rivières Draveurs (QMJHL)
10	156	Barry Heard	Canada	London Knights (OMJHL)
11	172	Mark Toffolo	United States	Port Huron Flags (IHL)
12	187	Paul Hogan	Canada	Regina Pats (WCHL)
12	189	Steve Barger	United States	Boston College (ECAC)
13	202	Rod Pacholzuk	Canada	University of Michigan (WCHA)
14	213	Wes Jarvis	Canada	Windsor Spitfires (OMJHL)
14	215	Ray Irwin	Canada	Oshawa Generals (OMJHL)

== See also ==
- 1978–79 NHL season
