= 1978–79 Pittsburgh Penguins season =

NHL team season

1978–79 Pittsburgh Penguins
- Division: 2nd Norris
- Conference: 4th Wales
- 1978–79 record: 36–31–13
- Home record: 23–12–5
- Road record: 13–19–8
- Goals for: 281
- Goals against: 279

Team information
- General manager: Baz Bastien
- Coach: Johnny Wilson
- Captain: Orest Kindrachuk
- Alternate captains: None
- Arena: Pittsburgh Civic Arena

Team leaders
- Goals: Greg Malone (35)
- Assists: Orest Kindrachuk (42)
- Points: Greg Malone (65)
- Penalty minutes: Dave Schultz (157)
- Wins: Denis Herron (22)
- Goals against average: Denis Herron (3.37)

The 1978–79 Pittsburgh Penguins season was their 12th in the National Hockey League (NHL). They finished second in the Norris Division, qualifying for the Stanley Cup playoffs for the first time since 1977. Their regular season was a marked improvement over the previous season, from 68 to 85 points.

== Regular season ==
=== Final standings ===
Norris Division
	GP	W	L	T	GF	GA	Pts
**Montreal Canadiens**	80	52	17	11	337	204	115
**Pittsburgh Penguins**	80	36	31	13	281	279	85
**Los Angeles Kings**	80	34	34	12	292	286	80
Washington Capitals	80	24	41	15	273	338	63
Detroit Red Wings	80	23	41	16	252	295	62

Note: W = Wins, L = Losses, T = Ties, GF = Goals For, GA = Goals Against, Pts = Points
Teams that qualified for the playoffs are highlighted in bold.

=== Record vs. opponents ===
Norris Division record vs. opponents

**Vs. Wales Conference**

**Vs. Campbell Conference**

**Vs. Norris Division**

1978–79 NHL records
Team	**DET**	**LAK**	**MTL**	**PIT**	**WSH**	**Total**
Detroit	—	1–5–2	2–4–2	3–5	3–2–3	**9–16–7**
Los Angeles	5–1–2	—	3–3–2	3–4–1	3–4–1	**14–12–6**
Montreal	4–2–2	3–3–2	—	5–2–1	7–0–1	**19–7–6**
Pittsburgh	5–3	4–3–1	2–5–1	—	4–3–1	**15–14–3**
Washington	2–3–3	4–3–1	0–7–1	3–4–1	—	**9–17–6**

**Vs. Adams Division**

1978–79 NHL records
Team	**BOS**	**BUF**	**MIN**	**TOR**	**Total**
Detroit	1–3	1–3	1–2–1	2–2	**5–10–1**
Los Angeles	3–1	1–2–1	3–1	0–4	**7–8–1**
Montreal	2–0–2	4–0	3–1	3–0–1	**12–1–3**
Pittsburgh	2–1–1	2–0–2	3–1	1–3	**8–5–3**
Washington	0–3–1	0–3–1	2–2	1–1–2	**3–9–4**

**Vs. Patrick Division**

1978–79 NHL records
Team	**ATL**	**NYI**	**NYR**	**PHI**	**Total**
Detroit	0–3–1	0–3–1	1–1–2	0–2–2	**1–9–6**
Los Angeles	2–2	0–2–2	1–3	0–4	**3–11–2**
Montreal	3–1	1–3	1–3	3–0–1	**8–7–1**
Pittsburgh	0–3–1	0–1–3	2–2	1–3	**3–9–4**
Washington	1–2–1	1–3	1–1–2	0–3–1	**3–9–4**

**Vs. Smythe Division**

1978–79 NHL records
Team	**CHI**	**COL**	**STL**	**VAN**	**Total**
Detroit	3–0–1	3–0–1	1–3	1–3	**8–6–2**
Los Angeles	3–1	2–0–2	2–1–1	3–1	**10–3–3**
Montreal	2–2	4–0	4–0	3–0–1	**13–2–1**
Pittsburgh	2–0–2	3–1	2–1–1	3–1	**10–3–3**
Washington	1–2–1	3–1	2–2	3–1	**9–6–1**

== Schedule and results ==
1978–79 regular season
October: 1–6–2 (home: 1–3–2; road: 0–3–0), 4 points

#	Date	Visitor	Score	Home	Location	Record	Points
1	Oct 11	Toronto Maple Leafs	3–2	Pittsburgh Penguins	Civic Arena	0–1–0	0
2	Oct 12	Pittsburgh Penguins	2–8	Boston Bruins	Boston Garden	0–2–0	0
3	Oct 14	Boston Bruins	4–4	Pittsburgh Penguins	Civic Arena	0–2–1	1
4	Oct 18	New York Islanders	5–3	Pittsburgh Penguins	Civic Arena	0–3–1	1
5	Oct 19	Pittsburgh Penguins	1–3	Philadelphia Flyers	The Spectrum	0–4–1	1
6	Oct 21	Washington Capitals	1–5	Pittsburgh Penguins	Civic Arena	1–4–1	3
7	Oct 25	St. Louis Blues	6–6	Pittsburgh Penguins	Civic Arena	1–4–2	4
8	Oct 28	Atlanta Flames	4–2	Pittsburgh Penguins	Civic Arena	1–5–2	4
9	Oct 29	Pittsburgh Penguins	2–3	New York Rangers	Madison Square Garden (IV)	1–6–2	4

November: 5–7–1 (home: 3–3–0; road: 2–4–1), 11 points

#	Date	Visitor	Score	Home	Location	Record	Points
10	Nov 1	Pittsburgh Penguins	4–6	Washington Capitals	Capital Centre	1–7–2	4
11	Nov 3	Pittsburgh Penguins	0–2	Atlanta Flames	Omni Coliseum	1–8–2	4
12	Nov 4	Detroit Red Wings	3–7	Pittsburgh Penguins	Civic Arena	2–8–2	6
13	Nov 8	Colorado Rockies	3–6	Pittsburgh Penguins	Civic Arena	3–8–2	8
14	Nov 9	Pittsburgh Penguins	4–4	Buffalo Sabres	Buffalo Memorial Auditorium	3–8–3	9
15	Nov 11	New York Rangers	2–1	Pittsburgh Penguins	Civic Arena	3–9–3	9
16	Nov 16	Pittsburgh Penguins	6–3	Vancouver Canucks	Pacific Coliseum	4–9–3	11
17	Nov 18	Pittsburgh Penguins	3–1	Los Angeles Kings	The Forum	5–9–3	13
18	Nov 22	Montreal Canadiens	3–2	Pittsburgh Penguins	Civic Arena	5–10–3	13
19	Nov 23	Pittsburgh Penguins	4–8	Montreal Canadiens	Montreal Forum	5–11–3	13
20	Nov 25	Philadelphia Flyers	3–1	Pittsburgh Penguins	Civic Arena	5–12–3	13
21	Nov 26	Pittsburgh Penguins	2–8	Toronto Maple Leafs	Maple Leaf Gardens	5–13–3	13
22	Nov 29	Washington Capitals	3–5	Pittsburgh Penguins	Civic Arena	6–13–3	15

December: 9–2–4 (home: 6–0–1; road: 3–2–3), 22 points

#	Date	Visitor	Score	Home	Location	Record	Points
23	Dec 1	Pittsburgh Penguins	7–4	Washington Capitals	Capital Centre	7–13–3	17
24	Dec 2	Chicago Black Hawks	2–5	Pittsburgh Penguins	Civic Arena	8–13–3	19
25	Dec 5	Pittsburgh Penguins	3–3	New York Islanders	Nassau Veterans Memorial Coliseum	8–13–4	20
26	Dec 6	Toronto Maple Leafs	4–6	Pittsburgh Penguins	Civic Arena	9–13–4	22
27	Dec 8	Pittsburgh Penguins	3–3	Montreal Canadiens	Montreal Forum	9–13–5	23
28	Dec 9	Buffalo Sabres	4–4	Pittsburgh Penguins	Civic Arena	9–13–6	24
29	Dec 13	St. Louis Blues	0–3	Pittsburgh Penguins	Civic Arena	10–13–6	26
30	Dec 14	Pittsburgh Penguins	1–2	Philadelphia Flyers	The Spectrum	10–14–6	26
31	Dec 16	Vancouver Canucks	5–6	Pittsburgh Penguins	Civic Arena	11–14–6	28
32	Dec 17	Pittsburgh Penguins	3–3	Chicago Black Hawks	Chicago Stadium	11–14–7	29
33	Dec 21	Pittsburgh Penguins	4–1	Los Angeles Kings	The Forum	12–14–7	31
34	Dec 23	Pittsburgh Penguins	3–5	Minnesota North Stars	Met Center	12–15–7	31
35	Dec 27	Los Angeles Kings	2–5	Pittsburgh Penguins	Civic Arena	13–15–7	33
36	Dec 30	Detroit Red Wings	1–3	Pittsburgh Penguins	Civic Arena	14–15–7	35
37	Dec 31	Pittsburgh Penguins	5–4	Detroit Red Wings	Olympia Stadium	15–15–7	37

January: 5–7–1 (home: 4–4–0; road: 1–3–1), 11 points

#	Date	Visitor	Score	Home	Location	Record	Points
38	Jan 3	Vancouver Canucks	5–3	Pittsburgh Penguins	Civic Arena	15–16–7	37
39	Jan 5	Pittsburgh Penguins	3–3	Atlanta Flames	Omni Coliseum	15–16–8	38
40	Jan 6	Los Angeles Kings	4–3	Pittsburgh Penguins	Civic Arena	15–17–8	38
41	Jan 10	Montreal Canadiens	2–3	Pittsburgh Penguins	Civic Arena	16–17–8	40
42	Jan 13	Boston Bruins	3–5	Pittsburgh Penguins	Civic Arena	17–17–8	42
43	Jan 14	Pittsburgh Penguins	5–4	Buffalo Sabres	Buffalo Memorial Auditorium	18–17–8	44
44	Jan 16	Minnesota North Stars	0–5	Pittsburgh Penguins	Civic Arena	19–17–8	46
45	Jan 17	Pittsburgh Penguins	1–4	Detroit Red Wings	Olympia Stadium	19–18–8	46
46	Jan 20	Washington Capitals	5–2	Pittsburgh Penguins	Civic Arena	19–19–8	46
47	Jan 24	Pittsburgh Penguins	1–4	Los Angeles Kings	The Forum	19–20–8	46
48	Jan 25	Pittsburgh Penguins	3–5	Colorado Rockies	McNichols Sports Arena	19–21–8	46
49	Jan 27	Los Angeles Kings	3–5	Pittsburgh Penguins	Civic Arena	20–21–8	48
50	Jan 31	Montreal Canadiens	4–1	Pittsburgh Penguins	Civic Arena	20–22–8	48

February: 6–3–1 (home: 6–0–0; road: 0–3–1), 13 points

#	Date	Visitor	Score	Home	Location	Record	Points
51	Feb 3	Detroit Red Wings	2–4	Pittsburgh Penguins	Civic Arena	21–22–8	50
52	Feb 4	Pittsburgh Penguins	3–8	Detroit Red Wings	Olympia Stadium	21–23–8	50
53	Feb 15	Minnesota North Stars	5–6	Pittsburgh Penguins	Civic Arena	22–23–8	52
54	Feb 17	Buffalo Sabres	3–6	Pittsburgh Penguins	Civic Arena	23–23–8	54
55	Feb 18	Pittsburgh Penguins	2–6	Detroit Red Wings	Olympia Stadium	23–24–8	54
56	Feb 21	Montreal Canadiens	1–3	Pittsburgh Penguins	Civic Arena	24–24–8	56
57	Feb 22	Pittsburgh Penguins	0–12	Montreal Canadiens	Montreal Forum	24–25–8	56
58	Feb 24	Chicago Black Hawks	1–5	Pittsburgh Penguins	Civic Arena	25–25–8	58
59	Feb 25	Pittsburgh Penguins	2–2	Chicago Black Hawks	Chicago Stadium	25–25–9	59
60	Feb 28	Colorado Rockies	3–5	Pittsburgh Penguins	Civic Arena	26–25–9	61

March: 8–4–4 (home: 2–1–2; road: 6–3–2), 20 points

#	Date	Visitor	Score	Home	Location	Record	Points
61	Mar 3	Pittsburgh Penguins	4–8	St. Louis Blues	The Checkerdome	26–26–9	61
62	Mar 4	Pittsburgh Penguins	7–2	Colorado Rockies	McNichols Sports Arena	27–26–9	63
63	Mar 7	Los Angeles Kings	4–0	Pittsburgh Penguins	Civic Arena	27–27–9	63
64	Mar 10	Philadelphia Flyers	2–3	Pittsburgh Penguins	Civic Arena	28–27–9	65
65	Mar 11	Pittsburgh Penguins	0–4	Toronto Maple Leafs	Maple Leaf Gardens	28–28–9	65
66	Mar 13	Pittsburgh Penguins	9–3	Vancouver Canucks	Pacific Coliseum	29–28–9	67
67	Mar 14	Pittsburgh Penguins	3–3	Los Angeles Kings	The Forum	29–28–10	68
68	Mar 17	Pittsburgh Penguins	5–2	Washington Capitals	Capital Centre	30–28–10	70
69	Mar 18	Pittsburgh Penguins	5–1	New York Rangers	Madison Square Garden (IV)	31–28–10	72
70	Mar 21	Washington Capitals	2–2	Pittsburgh Penguins	Civic Arena	31–28–11	73
71	Mar 22	Pittsburgh Penguins	3–1	Boston Bruins	Boston Garden	32–28–11	75
72	Mar 24	Pittsburgh Penguins	3–3	New York Islanders	Nassau Veterans Memorial Coliseum	32–28–12	76
73	Mar 25	New York Islanders	2–2	Pittsburgh Penguins	Civic Arena	32–28–13	77
74	Mar 27	Pittsburgh Penguins	5–1	Minnesota North Stars	Met Center	33–28–13	79
75	Mar 28	New York Rangers	1–7	Pittsburgh Penguins	Civic Arena	34–28–13	81
76	Mar 31	Pittsburgh Penguins	3–5	Montreal Canadiens	Montreal Forum	34–29–13	81

April: 2–2–0 (home: 1–1–0; road: 1–1–0), 4 points

#	Date	Visitor	Score	Home	Location	Record	Points
77	Apr 1	Atlanta Flames	7–2	Pittsburgh Penguins	Civic Arena	34–30–13	81
78	Apr 3	Pittsburgh Penguins	3–2	St. Louis Blues	The Checkerdome	35–30–13	83
79	Apr 7	Detroit Red Wings	3–4	Pittsburgh Penguins	Civic Arena	36–30–13	85
80	Apr 8	Pittsburgh Penguins	2–5	Washington Capitals	Capital Centre	36–31–13	85

Legend: Win (2 points) Loss (0 points) Tie (1 point)

== Playoffs ==
=== Preliminary round vs. Buffalo ===
April 10	Pittsburgh Penguins	4–3	Buffalo Sabres	Buffalo Memorial Auditorium

April 12	Buffalo Sabres	3–1	Pittsburgh Penguins	Civic Arena

April 14	Pittsburgh Penguins	4–3	OT	Buffalo Sabres	Buffalo Memorial Auditorium

Pittsburgh won series 2–1

=== Quarterfinals vs. Boston ===
April 16	Pittsburgh Penguins	2–6	Boston Bruins	Boston Garden	Recap
No scoring		First period	02:29 – Peter McNab (1); 05:14 – Don Marcotte (1); 15:58 – Mike Milbury (1)
Orest Kindrachuk (2) – 06:07		Second period	04:21 – Don Marcotte (2); 16:02 – pp – Bobby Schmautz (1); 17:27 – sh – Dick Redmond (1)
Gregg Sheppard (1) – pp – 12:14		Third period	No scoring
Denis Herron 27 saves / 33 shots		Goalie stats	Gerry Cheevers 19 saves / 21 shots

April 18	Pittsburgh Penguins	1–5	Boston Bruins	Boston Garden	Recap
Jim Hamilton (3) – pp – 14:11		First period	15:10 – pp – Jean Ratelle (1); 16:16 – Dwight Foster (1)
Orest Kindrachuk (3) – 14:52		Second period	14:15 – Peter McNab (2)
Orest Kindrachuck (4) – 19:54		Third period	10:10 – Bob Miller (1)
Denis Herron 21 saves / 25 shots		Goalie stats	Gerry Cheevers 24 saves / 27 shots

April 21	Boston Bruins	2–1	Pittsburgh Penguins	Civic Arena

April 22	Boston Bruins	4–1	Pittsburgh Penguins	Civic Arena

Boston won series 4–0

== Player statistics ==
Skaters

Regular season
Player	GP	G	A	Pts	+/−	PIM
Greg Malone	80	35	30	65	6	52
Orest Kindrachuk	79	18	42	60	3	84
Peter Lee	80	32	26	58	–13	24
Peter Mahovlich	60	14	39	53	–11	39
George Ferguson	80	21	29	50	10	37
Randy Carlyle	70	13	34	47	4	78
Ross Lonsberry	80	24	22	46	7	38
Rick Kehoe	57	27	18	45	14	2
Rod Schutt	74	24	21	45	–9	33
Ron Stackhouse	75	10	33	43	21	54
Gregg Sheppard	60	15	22	37	8	9
Dale Tallon	63	5	24	29	–15	35
Tom Bladon	78	4	23	27	–17	64
Colin Campbell	65	2	18	20	14	137
Blair Chapman	71	10	8	18	–12	18
Russ Anderson	72	3	13	16	1	93
Gary McAdam^{†}	28	5	9	14	4	2
Dave Schultz^{‡}	47	4	9	13	–2	157
Wayne Bianchin	40	7	4	11	–2	20
Jacques Cossette	38	7	2	9	–1	16
Bob Paradise	14	0	1	1	–4	4
Kim Davis	1	1	0	1	0	0
Tom Price	2	0	0	0	–2	4
Jim Hamilton	2	0	0	0	0	0
Mike Meeker	4	0	0	0	–1	5
Brian Spencer	7	0	0	0	0	0
Lex Hudson	2	0	0	0	0	0
Total		281	427	708	—	1,005

Playoffs
Player	GP	G	A	Pts	+/−	PIM
Colin Campbell	7	1	4	5	0	30
Orest Kindrachuk	7	4	1	5	0	7
Tom Bladon	7	0	4	4	0	2
George Ferguson	7	2	1	3	0	0
Jim Hamilton	5	3	0	3	0	0
Gregg Sheppard	7	1	2	3	0	0
Peter Lee	7	0	3	3	0	0
Gary McAdam	7	2	1	3	0	0
Ross Lonsberry	7	0	2	2	0	9
Rick Kehoe	7	0	2	2	0	0
Rod Schutt	7	2	0	2	0	4
Blair Chapman	7	1	0	1	0	2
Greg Malone	7	0	1	1	0	10
Peter Mahovlich	2	0	1	1	0	0
Jacques Cossette	3	0	1	1	0	4
Bob Paradise	2	0	0	0	0	0
Ron Stackhouse	7	0	0	0	0	4
Randy Carlyle	7	0	0	0	0	12
Lex Hudson	2	0	0	0	0	0
Russ Anderson	2	0	0	0	0	0
Total		16	23	39	—	84

Goaltenders

Regular Season
Player	GP	W	L	T	GA	SO
Denis Herron	56	22	19	12	180	0
Gregory Millen	28	14	11	1	86	2
Gordon Laxton	1	0	1	0	8	0
Total		36	31	13	274	2

Playoffs
Player	GP	W	L	T	GA	SO
Denis Herron	7	2	5	0	24	0
Total		2	5	0	24	0

^{†}Denotes player spent time with another team before joining the Penguins. Stats reflect time with the Penguins only.
^{‡}Denotes player was traded mid-season. Stats reflect time with the Penguins only.

== Transactions ==
The Penguins were involved in the following transactions during the 1978–79 season:

=== Trades ===
September 6, 1978	To Boston Bruins Jean Pronovost	To Pittsburgh Penguins Gregg Sheppard
October 9, 1978	To Chicago Blackhawks 1980 2nd round pick (Ken Solheim)	To Pittsburgh Penguins Dale Tallon
October 18, 1978	To Montreal Canadiens 1981 1st round pick (Mark Hunter)	To Pittsburgh Penguins Rod Schutt
November 17, 1978	To Vancouver Canucks Dunc Wilson	To Pittsburgh Penguins cash
February 6, 1979	To Buffalo Sabres Dave Schultz	To Pittsburgh Penguins Gary McAdam
June 9, 1979	To Winnipeg Jets 1980 7th round pick (Michael Lauen)	To Pittsburgh Penguins Jets promise not to claim Kim Clackson as a priority selection from its WHA franchise
August 3, 1979	To Detroit Red Wings Pete Mahovlich	To Pittsburgh Penguins Nick Libett

=== Additions and subtractions ===
Additions
Player	Former team	Via

Subtractions
Player	New team	Via
Gene Carr	Atlanta Flames	free agency (1978-06-06)
Ed Gilbert	Cincinnati Stingers (WHA)	free agency (1978-10)

== Draft picks ==
The 1978 NHL entry draft was held on June 15, 1978, in Montreal.

Round	#	Player	Pos	Nationality	College/Junior/Club team (League)
2	25	Michael Meeker	Right wing	Canada	Peterborough Petes (OHA)
4	61	Shane Pearsall	Left wing	Canada	Ottawa 67's (OHA)
5	75	Robert Garner	Center	Canada	Toronto Marlboros (OHA)
