= 1978–79 Detroit Red Wings season =

Sports season

1978–79 Detroit Red Wings
- League: 15th NHL
- Division: 5th Norris
- Conference: 9th Wales
- 1978–79 record: 23–41–16
- Home record: 15–17–8
- Road record: 8–24–8
- Goals for: 252
- Goals against: 295

Team information
- General manager: Ted Lindsay
- Coach: Bobby Kromm
- Captain: Dennis Hextall; Nick Libett and Paul Woods
- Arena: Detroit Olympia

Team leaders
- Goals: Václav Nedomanský (38)
- Assists: Reed Larson (49)
- Points: Vaclav Nedomansky (73)
- Penalty minutes: Dennis Polonich (208)
- Wins: Jim Rutherford (13)
- Goals against average: Jim Rutherford (3.27)

The 1978–79 Detroit Red Wings season was the Red Wings' 47th season and 53rd overall for the franchise. It is the last full season at the Detroit Olympia for the team. A year later, they would move to the newly built Joe Louis Arena. The Red Wings did not qualify for the playoffs for the first time since the 1976–77 season and it is also since the 1976-77 season that the team finished last in the conference despite qualifying the previous year.

== Regular season ==
=== Final standings ===
Norris Division
	GP	W	L	T	GF	GA	Pts
**Montreal Canadiens**	80	52	17	11	337	204	115
**Pittsburgh Penguins**	80	36	31	13	281	279	85
**Los Angeles Kings**	80	34	34	12	292	286	80
Washington Capitals	80	24	41	15	273	338	63
Detroit Red Wings	80	23	41	16	252	295	62

Note: W = Wins, L = Losses, T = Ties, GF = Goals For, GA = Goals Against, Pts = Points
Teams that qualified for the playoffs are highlighted in bold.

=== Record vs. opponents ===
Norris Division record vs. opponents

**Vs. Wales Conference**

**Vs. Campbell Conference**

**Vs. Norris Division**

1978–79 NHL records
Team	**DET**	**LAK**	**MTL**	**PIT**	**WSH**	**Total**
Detroit	—	1–5–2	2–4–2	3–5	3–2–3	**9–16–7**
Los Angeles	5–1–2	—	3–3–2	3–4–1	3–4–1	**14–12–6**
Montreal	4–2–2	3–3–2	—	5–2–1	7–0–1	**19–7–6**
Pittsburgh	5–3	4–3–1	2–5–1	—	4–3–1	**15–14–3**
Washington	2–3–3	4–3–1	0–7–1	3–4–1	—	**9–17–6**

**Vs. Adams Division**

1978–79 NHL records
Team	**BOS**	**BUF**	**MIN**	**TOR**	**Total**
Detroit	1–3	1–3	1–2–1	2–2	**5–10–1**
Los Angeles	3–1	1–2–1	3–1	0–4	**7–8–1**
Montreal	2–0–2	4–0	3–1	3–0–1	**12–1–3**
Pittsburgh	2–1–1	2–0–2	3–1	1–3	**8–5–3**
Washington	0–3–1	0–3–1	2–2	1–1–2	**3–9–4**

**Vs. Patrick Division**

1978–79 NHL records
Team	**ATL**	**NYI**	**NYR**	**PHI**	**Total**
Detroit	0–3–1	0–3–1	1–1–2	0–2–2	**1–9–6**
Los Angeles	2–2	0–2–2	1–3	0–4	**3–11–2**
Montreal	3–1	1–3	1–3	3–0–1	**8–7–1**
Pittsburgh	0–3–1	0–1–3	2–2	1–3	**3–9–4**
Washington	1–2–1	1–3	1–1–2	0–3–1	**3–9–4**

**Vs. Smythe Division**

1978–79 NHL records
Team	**CHI**	**COL**	**STL**	**VAN**	**Total**
Detroit	3–0–1	3–0–1	1–3	1–3	**8–6–2**
Los Angeles	3–1	2–0–2	2–1–1	3–1	**10–3–3**
Montreal	2–2	4–0	4–0	3–0–1	**13–2–1**
Pittsburgh	2–0–2	3–1	2–1–1	3–1	**10–3–3**
Washington	1–2–1	3–1	2–2	3–1	**9–6–1**

== Schedule and results ==
1978–79 regular season
October

Game	Result	Date	Score	Opponent	Record
1	L	October 11, 1978	4–5	St. Louis Blues (1978–79)	0–1–0
2	L	October 14, 1978	1–3	Philadelphia Flyers (1978–79)	0–2–0
3	W	October 15, 1978	3–2	@ Buffalo Sabres (1978–79)	1–2–0
4	T	October 18, 1978	3–3	@ New York Rangers (1978–79)	1–2–1
5	T	October 19, 1978	2–2	New York Rangers (1978–79)	1–2–2
6	T	October 21, 1978	4–4	Minnesota North Stars (1978–79)	1–2–3
7	W	October 25, 1978	5–4	Colorado Rockies (1978–79)	2–2–3
8	W	October 27, 1978	5–2	@ Colorado Rockies (1978–79)	3–2–3
9	W	October 28, 1978	7–2	Chicago Black Hawks (1978–79)	4–2–3

November

Game	Result	Date	Score	Opponent	Record
10	L	November 1, 1978	1–4	Montreal Canadiens (1978–79)	4–3–3
11	L	November 4, 1978	3–7	@ Pittsburgh Penguins (1978–79)	4–4–3
12	T	November 5, 1978	3–3	@ Washington Capitals (1978–79)	4–4–4
13	L	November 8, 1978	4–6	Vancouver Canucks (1978–79)	4–5–4
14	L	November 9, 1978	3–8	@ Montreal Canadiens (1978–79)	4–6–4
15	W	November 11, 1978	7–1	Boston Bruins (1978–79)	5–6–4
16	L	November 15, 1978	3–5	@ Atlanta Flames (1978–79)	5–7–4
17	L	November 18, 1978	1–3	Buffalo Sabres (1978–79)	5–8–4
18	L	November 19, 1978	3–4	@ Philadelphia Flyers (1978–79)	5–9–4
19	T	November 22, 1978	3–3	@ Los Angeles Kings (1978–79)	5–9–5
20	L	November 25, 1978	0–4	@ St. Louis Blues (1978–79)	5–10–5
21	W	November 26, 1978	4–2	Los Angeles Kings (1978–79)	6–10–5
22	T	November 29, 1978	2–2	@ Colorado Rockies (1978–79)	6–10–6

December

Game	Result	Date	Score	Opponent	Record
23	L	December 1, 1978	1–2	@ Vancouver Canucks (1978–79)	6–11–6
24	L	December 2, 1978	2–5	@ Los Angeles Kings (1978–79)	6–12–6
25	T	December 6, 1978	2–2	Montreal Canadiens (1978–79)	6–12–7
26	L	December 7, 1978	5–6	@ Boston Bruins (1978–79)	6–13–7
27	W	December 9, 1978	5–4	New York Rangers (1978–79)	7–13–7
28	T	December 10, 1978	3–3	@ Chicago Black Hawks (1978–79)	7–13–8
29	T	December 13, 1978	5–5	Atlanta Flames (1978–79)	7–13–9
30	L	December 14, 1978	1–4	@ New York Islanders (1978–79)	7–14–9
31	L	December 16, 1978	2–4	@ Toronto Maple Leafs (1978–79)	7–15–9
32	L	December 17, 1978	0–3	New York Islanders (1978–79)	7–16–9
33	W	December 20, 1978	7–2	Vancouver Canucks (1978–79)	8–16–9
34	L	December 22, 1978	2–4	@ New York Rangers (1978–79)	8–17–9
35	T	December 23, 1978	2–2	Washington Capitals (1978–79)	8–17–10
36	T	December 26, 1978	2–2	Philadelphia Flyers (1978–79)	8–17–11
37	L	December 27, 1978	2–5	Montreal Canadiens (1978–79)	8–18–11
38	L	December 30, 1978	1–3	@ Pittsburgh Penguins (1978–79)	8–19–11
39	L	December 31, 1978	4–5	Pittsburgh Penguins (1978–79)	8–20–11

January

Game	Result	Date	Score	Opponent	Record
40	L	January 6, 1979	1–4	Washington Capitals (1978–79)	8–21–11
41	L	January 7, 1979	3–4	@ Buffalo Sabres (1978–79)	8–22–11
42	T	January 10, 1979	5–5	New York Islanders (1978–79)	8–22–12
43	T	January 11, 1979	3–3	@ Philadelphia Flyers (1978–79)	8–22–13
44	L	January 13, 1979	3–7	Los Angeles Kings (1978–79)	8–23–13
45	W	January 17, 1979	4–1	Pittsburgh Penguins (1978–79)	9–23–13
46	L	January 19, 1979	1–5	@ Washington Capitals (1978–79)	9–24–13
47	L	January 20, 1979	3–4	Atlanta Flames (1978–79)	9–25–13
48	T	January 25, 1979	6–6	@ Los Angeles Kings (1978–79)	9–25–14
49	L	January 27, 1979	3–6	Buffalo Sabres (1978–79)	9–26–14
50	L	January 28, 1979	2–7	@ Atlanta Flames (1978–79)	9–27–14
51	W	January 30, 1979	7–4	Washington Capitals (1978–79)	10–27–14

February

Game	Result	Date	Score	Opponent	Record
52	L	February 1, 1979	1–6	@ Minnesota North Stars (1978–79)	10–28–14
53	L	February 3, 1979	2–4	@ Pittsburgh Penguins (1978–79)	10–29–14
54	W	February 4, 1979	8–3	Pittsburgh Penguins (1978–79)	11–29–14
55	L	February 14, 1979	2–3	Los Angeles Kings (1978–79)	11–30–14
56	W	February 18, 1979	6–2	Pittsburgh Penguins (1978–79)	12–30–14
57	L	February 19, 1979	2–6	Toronto Maple Leafs (1978–79)	12–31–14
58	W	February 21, 1979	4–3	@ Washington Capitals (1978–79)	13–31–14
59	L	February 24, 1979	1–3	@ New York Islanders (1978–79)	13–32–14
60	W	February 25, 1979	8–1	Colorado Rockies (1978–79)	14–32–14
61	L	February 28, 1979	5–6	St. Louis Blues (1978–79)	14–33–14

March

Game	Result	Date	Score	Opponent	Record
62	W	March 3, 1979	5–3	@ Montreal Canadiens (1978–79)	15–33–14
63	L	March 4, 1979	4–6	Boston Bruins (1978–79)	15–34–14
64	L	March 7, 1979	1–5	@ Minnesota North Stars (1978–79)	15–35–14
65	T	March 11, 1979	3–3	Washington Capitals (1978–79)	15–35–15
66	T	March 12, 1979	3–3	@ Montreal Canadiens (1978–79)	15–35–16
67	W	March 14, 1979	4–1	@ Washington Capitals (1978–79)	16–35–16
68	W	March 17, 1979	3–1	@ St. Louis Blues (1978–79)	17–35–16
69	W	March 18, 1979	4–2	@ Chicago Black Hawks (1978–79)	18–35–16
70	W	March 20, 1979	5–3	Chicago Black Hawks (1978–79)	19–35–16
71	W	March 21, 1979	4–2	@ Toronto Maple Leafs (1978–79)	20–35–16
72	L	March 24, 1979	2–5	@ Boston Bruins (1978–79)	20–36–16
73	W	March 25, 1979	2–1	Toronto Maple Leafs (1978–79)	21–36–16
74	L	March 27, 1979	2–5	@ Vancouver Canucks (1978–79)	21–37–16
75	L	March 28, 1979	1–8	@ Los Angeles Kings (1978–79)	21–38–16
76	L	March 31, 1979	4–5	Los Angeles Kings (1978–79)	21–39–16

April

Game	Result	Date	Score	Opponent	Record
77	W	April 1, 1979	3–1	Minnesota North Stars (1978–79)	22–39–16
78	L	April 4, 1979	1–4	@ Montreal Canadiens (1978–79)	22–40–16
79	L	April 7, 1979	3–4	@ Pittsburgh Penguins (1978–79)	22–41–16
80	W	April 8, 1979	1–0	Montreal Canadiens (1978–79)	23–41–16

Legend: Win (2 points) Loss (0 points) Tie (1 point)

== Player statistics ==
=== Regular season ===
Scoring

Player	Pos	GP	G	A	Pts	PIM	+/-	PPG	SHG	GWG
Vaclav Nedomansky	RW	80	38	35	73	19	-13	13	0	2
Dale McCourt	C	79	28	43	71	14	-27	14	2	3
Reed Larson	D	79	18	49	67	169	-20	6	2	0
Errol Thompson	LW	70	23	31	54	26	-28	8	0	3
Andre St. Laurent	C	76	18	31	49	124	-31	4	1	1
Dan Labraaten	LW	78	19	19	38	8	-17	7	0	3
Paul Woods	LW	80	14	23	37	59	-26	1	3	1
Nick Libett	LW	68	15	19	34	20	4	3	1	0
Willie Huber	D	68	7	24	31	114	-25	4	0	2
Dan Bolduc	LW	56	16	13	29	14	-9	3	0	4
Perry Miller	D	75	5	23	28	156	-13	3	0	1
Thommie Bergman	D	68	10	17	27	64	-25	3	1	1
Dennis Polonich	C/RW	62	10	12	22	208	-10	1	0	0
Roland Cloutier	C	19	6	6	12	2	0	1	0	1
Dennis Hextall	LW	20	4	8	12	33	3	2	0	0
Fern LeBlanc	C	29	5	6	11	0	1	1	0	0
Bill Lochead	LW	40	4	7	11	20	-4	0	0	0
Greg Carroll	C	36	2	9	11	8	-6	1	0	0
Bill Hogaboam	C	18	4	6	10	4	-5	1	0	1
J.P. LeBlanc	C	24	2	6	8	4	-7	2	0	0
Jean Hamel	D	52	2	4	6	72	-9	0	0	0
Terry Harper	D	51	0	6	6	58	-3	0	0	0
Greg Joly	D	20	0	4	4	6	-8	0	0	0
Al Cameron	D	9	0	3	3	8	1	0	0	0
John Hilworth	D	37	1	1	2	66	-13	0	0	0
Rob Plumb	LW	7	1	1	2	2	-1	0	0	0
Lorry Gloeckner	D	13	0	2	2	6	-7	0	0	0
Jim Rutherford	G	32	0	2	2	4	0	0	0	0
John Taft	D	15	0	2	2	4	2	0	0	0
Rogie Vachon	G	50	0	1	1	21	0	0	0	0
Mal Davis	LW	6	0	0	0	0	-2	0	0	0
Dave Hanson	D	11	0	0	0	26	-1	0	0	0
Brent Peterson	C	5	0	0	0	0	0	0	0	0
Steve Short	LW	1	0	0	0	0	0	0	0	0
Bjorn Skaare	C	1	0	0	0	0	0	0	0	0

Goaltending

Player	MIN	GP	W	L	T	GA	GAA	SO
Jim Rutherford	1892	32	13	14	5	103	3.27	1
Rogie Vachon	2908	50	10	27	11	189	3.90	0
Team:	4800	80	23	41	16	292	3.65	1

Note: GP = Games played; G = Goals; A = Assists; Pts = Points; +/- = Plus-minus PIM = Penalty minutes; PPG = Power-play goals; SHG = Short-handed goals; GWG = Game-winning goals;
MIN = Minutes played; W = Wins; L = Losses; T = Ties; GA = Goals against; GAA = Goals-against average; SO = Shutouts;

== Draft picks ==
Detroit's draft picks at the 1978 NHL amateur draft held at the Queen Elizabeth Hotel in Montreal. Ladislav Svozil was the first Czechoslovak player drafted in the history of the NHL Draft. The Red Wings selected Svozil with their 14th pick in the 1978 Draft.

Round	#	Player	Nationality	College/Junior/Club team (League)
1	9	Willie Huber	Canada	Hamilton Fincups (OMJHL)
1	12	Brent Peterson	Canada	Portland Winterhawks (WCHL)
2	28	Glenn Hicks	Canada	Flin Flon Bombers (WCHL)
2	31	Al Jensen	Canada	Hamilton Fincups (OMJHL)
3	53	Doug Derkson	Canada	New Westminster Bruins (WCHL)
4	62	Bjorn Skaare	Norway	Ottawa 67's (OMJHL)
5	78	Ted Nolan	Canada	Toronto Marlboros (OMJHL)
6	95	Sylvain Locas	Canada	Sherbrooke Castors (QMJHL)
7	112	Wes George	Canada	Saskatoon Blades (WCHL)
8	129	John Barrett	Canada	Windsor Spitfires (OMJHL)
9	146	Jim Malazdrewicz	Canada	St. Boniface Saints (MJHL)
10	163	Geoff Shaw	Canada	Hamilton Fincups (OMJHL)
11	178	Carl Van Harrewyn	Canada	New Westminster Bruins (WCHL)
12	194	Ladislav Svozil	Czechoslovakia	HC Vitkovice (Czechoslovakia)
13	208	Tom Bailey	Canada	Kingston Canadians (OMJHL)
14	219	Larry Lozinski	Canada	Flin Flon Bombers (WCHL)
15	224	Randy Betty	Canada	New Westminster Bruins (WCHL)
16	226	Brian Crawley	Canada	St. Lawrence University (ECAC)
17	228	Doug Feasby	Canada	Toronto Marlboros (OMJHL)

== See also ==
- 1978–79 NHL season
