= 1978–79 Chicago Black Hawks season =

National Hockey League team season

1978–79 Chicago Black Hawks
- Smythe Division champions
- Division: 1st Smythe
- Conference: 5th Campbell
- 1978–79 record: 29–36–15
- Home record: 18–12–10
- Road record: 11–24–5
- Goals for: 244
- Goals against: 277

Team information
- General manager: Bob Pulford
- Coach: Bob Pulford
- Captain: Keith Magnuson
- Alternate captains: None
- Arena: Chicago Stadium

Team leaders
- Goals: Ivan Boldirev (29)
- Assists: Stan Mikita (36)
- Points: Ivan Boldirev (64)
- Penalty minutes: Dave Logan (176)
- Plus/minus: Ted Bulley (+17)
- Wins: Tony Esposito (24)
- Goals against average: Tony Esposito (3.28)

The 1978–79 Chicago Black Hawks season was the 53rd season of operation of the Chicago Black Hawks in the National Hockey League (NHL). The club was coming off a first-place finish in the Smythe Division in 1977–78. In the 1978 Stanley Cup playoffs, the Black Hawks were swept by the Boston Bruins in four games in the quarter-finals.

== Offseason ==
The Black Hawks had a very quiet off-season, however, Chicago did acquire 21-year-old goaltender Murray Bannerman from the Vancouver Canucks to complete an earlier trade that sent Pit Martin to the Canucks. Bannerman spent the previous season with the Fort Wayne Komets of the IHL, and did appear in a game with Vancouver, allowing no goals in a period of action.

In a couple of minor trades, Chicago traded away Pierre Plante to the Minnesota North Stars to complete an earlier deal, and in a separate trade, Chicago traded Thomas Gradin to the Vancouver Canucks for the Canucks second-round draft pick in the 1980 NHL entry draft.

== Regular season ==
Chicago opened the season with a six-game unbeaten streak, going 3–0–3, before suffering their first loss. The Hawks would struggle after their hot start, as Chicago saw their record fall to 17-24-9 at the start of February, however, despite their poor record, the Black Hawks were in first place in the Smythe Division. The Black Hawks turned their fortunes around in their next 14 games, going 8–3–3, putting their record at 25–27–12, with 62 points, 14 ahead of the second place Vancouver Canucks. Chicago then fell into an eight-game winless streak (0–7–1), but still held a 10-point lead. Chicago then finished the season with a 29–36–15 record, earning 73 points, and winning the Smythe Division for the second season in a row, and seventh division title in the past ten seasons.

Offensively, the Black Hawks were led by Ivan Boldirev, who led the club with 29 goals and 64 points in 66 games. Stan Mikita had 19 goals and a team high 36 assists for 55 points to finish second in team scoring. Defenceman Bob Murray scored 19 goals and 51 points to lead the Black Hawks blueline. Defenceman Dave Logan had a team high 175 penalty minutes, while winger Ted Bulley led Chicago with a +18 rating.

In goal, Tony Esposito saw the majority of playing time, going 24-28-11 with a 3.27 GAA, while earning four shutouts.

=== Final standings ===
Smythe Division
	GP	W	L	T	GF	GA	Pts
Chicago Black Hawks	80	29	36	15	244	277	73
Vancouver Canucks	80	25	42	13	217	291	63
St. Louis Blues	80	18	50	12	249	348	48
Colorado Rockies	80	15	53	12	210	331	42

=== Record vs. opponents ===
Smythe Division record vs. opponents

Vs. Campbell Conference

Vs. Wales Conference

Vs. Smythe Division

1978–79 NHL records
Team	CHI	COL	STL	VAN	Total
Chicago	—	5–2–1	5–2–1	1–3–4	11–7–6
Colorado	2–5–1	—	4–2–2	1–6–1	7–13–4
St. Louis	2–5–1	2–4–2	—	1–4–3	5–13–6
Vancouver	3–1–4	6–1–1	4–1–3	—	13–3–8

Vs. Patrick Division

1978–79 NHL records
Team	ATL	NYI	NYR	PHI	Total
Chicago	1–2–2	2–3	0–4	3–1	6–10–2
Colorado	0–4	0–4–1	1–4	0–3–1	1–15–2
St. Louis	1–4	0–3–2	2–3	1–4	4–14–2
Vancouver	2–2	0–4	0–4	1–2–1	3–12–1

Vs. Adams Division

1978–79 NHL records
Team	BOS	BUF	MIN	TOR	Total
Chicago	1–3–1	2–2–1	2–2	2–1–1	7–8–3
Colorado	1–3	0–3–1	3–2–1	1–2–1	5–10–3
St. Louis	1–3	0–3–1	1–2–1	0–4	2–12–2
Vancouver	0–4	1–3–1	1–4–1	1–3–1	3–14–3

Vs. Norris Division

1978–79 NHL records
Team	DET	LAK	MTL	PIT	WSH	Total
Chicago	0–3–1	1–3	2–2	0–2–2	2–1–1	5–11–4
Colorado	0–3–1	0–2–2	0–4	1–3	1–3	2–15–3
St. Louis	3–1	1–2–1	0–4	1–2–1	2–2	7–12–1
Vancouver	3–1	1–3	0–3–1	1–3	1–3	6–12–2

== Schedule and results ==
1978–79 regular season
October

Game	Result	Date	Score	Opponent	Record
1	T	October 11, 1978	4–4	Atlanta Flames (1978–79)	0–0–1
2	T	October 15, 1978	3–3	Vancouver Canucks (1978–79)	0–0–2
3	W	October 18, 1978	4–2	@ Washington Capitals (1978–79)	1–0–2
4	W	October 19, 1978	6–2	Minnesota North Stars (1978–79)	2–0–2
5	W	October 22, 1978	6–5	Boston Bruins (1978–79)	3–0–2
6	T	October 25, 1978	2–2	Washington Capitals (1978–79)	3–0–3
7	L	October 28, 1978	2–7	@ Detroit Red Wings (1978–79)	3–1–3
8	W	October 29, 1978	4–1	Montreal Canadiens (1978–79)	4–1–3

November

Game	Result	Date	Score	Opponent	Record
9	L	November 1, 1978	0–1	Vancouver Canucks (1978–79)	4–2–3
10	T	November 4, 1978	5–5	@ St. Louis Blues (1978–79)	4–2–4
11	W	November 5, 1978	3–1	St. Louis Blues (1978–79)	5–2–4
12	W	November 8, 1978	2–1	Toronto Maple Leafs (1978–79)	6–2–4
13	L	November 10, 1978	3–5	@ Atlanta Flames (1978–79)	6–3–4
14	L	November 12, 1978	1–4	Los Angeles Kings (1978–79)	6–4–4
15	L	November 15, 1978	1–8	@ New York Rangers (1978–79)	6–5–4
16	W	November 16, 1978	4–3	@ Philadelphia Flyers (1978–79)	7–5–4
17	L	November 18, 1978	3–8	@ Colorado Rockies (1978–79)	7–6–4
18	L	November 20, 1978	3–4	@ Los Angeles Kings (1978–79)	7–7–4
19	L	November 21, 1978	2–5	@ Vancouver Canucks (1978–79)	7–8–4
20	W	November 25, 1978	8–3	@ Montreal Canadiens (1978–79)	8–8–4
21	T	November 29, 1978	1–1	Vancouver Canucks (1978–79)	8–8–5

December

Game	Result	Date	Score	Opponent	Record
22	L	December 2, 1978	2–5	@ Pittsburgh Penguins (1978–79)	8–9–5
23	W	December 3, 1978	4–3	Colorado Rockies (1978–79)	9–9–5
24	L	December 7, 1978	2–4	@ Vancouver Canucks (1978–79)	9–10–5
25	W	December 9, 1978	4–2	@ St. Louis Blues (1978–79)	10–10–5
26	T	December 10, 1978	3–3	Detroit Red Wings (1978–79)	10–10–6
27	L	December 13, 1978	2–6	Buffalo Sabres (1978–79)	10–11–6
28	L	December 14, 1978	2–3	@ Buffalo Sabres (1978–79)	10–12–6
29	L	December 16, 1978	1–5	@ Colorado Rockies (1978–79)	10–13–6
30	T	December 17, 1978	3–3	Pittsburgh Penguins (1978–79)	10–13–7
31	L	December 20, 1978	3–5	Montreal Canadiens (1978–79)	10–14–7
32	L	December 21, 1978	1–5	@ Montreal Canadiens (1978–79)	10–15–7
33	W	December 23, 1978	5–2	Philadelphia Flyers (1978–79)	11–15–7
34	W	December 27, 1978	4–3	St. Louis Blues (1978–79)	12–15–7
35	L	December 30, 1978	4–5	New York Rangers (1978–79)	12–16–7

January

Game	Result	Date	Score	Opponent	Record
36	L	January 3, 1979	3–6	Boston Bruins (1978–79)	12–17–7
37	T	January 4, 1979	3–3	@ Buffalo Sabres (1978–79)	12–17–8
38	W	January 6, 1979	5–3	@ Toronto Maple Leafs (1978–79)	13–17–8
39	W	January 7, 1979	5–3	Washington Capitals (1978–79)	14–17–8
40	W	January 10, 1979	3–0	Los Angeles Kings (1978–79)	15–17–8
41	L	January 13, 1979	3–4	@ Minnesota North Stars (1978–79)	15–18–8
42	W	January 17, 1979	2–1	Colorado Rockies (1978–79)	16–18–8
43	L	January 19, 1979	1–6	@ Atlanta Flames (1978–79)	16–19–8
44	L	January 20, 1979	2–4	@ New York Islanders (1978–79)	16–20–8
45	L	January 22, 1979	1–2	New York Islanders (1978–79)	16–21–8
46	W	January 24, 1979	5–0	@ Vancouver Canucks (1978–79)	17–21–8
47	L	January 27, 1979	1–4	@ Washington Capitals (1978–79)	17–22–8
48	L	January 28, 1979	2–7	St. Louis Blues (1978–79)	17–23–8
49	T	January 31, 1979	2–2	Boston Bruins (1978–79)	17–23–9

February

Game	Result	Date	Score	Opponent	Record
50	L	February 1, 1979	1–6	@ Boston Bruins (1978–79)	17–24–9
51	W	February 3, 1979	4–2	@ Atlanta Flames (1978–79)	18–24–9
52	W	February 4, 1979	5–4	New York Islanders (1978–79)	19–24–9
53	L	February 12, 1979	2–5	Toronto Maple Leafs (1978–79)	19–25–9
54	T	February 14, 1979	4–4	Atlanta Flames (1978–79)	19–25–10
55	W	February 17, 1979	5–1	@ St. Louis Blues (1978–79)	20–25–10
56	W	February 18, 1979	5–3	Colorado Rockies (1978–79)	21–25–10
57	W	February 21, 1979	3–2	Buffalo Sabres (1978–79)	22–25–10
58	W	February 22, 1979	4–2	@ Buffalo Sabres (1978–79)	23–25–10
59	L	February 24, 1979	1–5	@ Pittsburgh Penguins (1978–79)	23–26–10
60	T	February 25, 1979	2–2	Pittsburgh Penguins (1978–79)	23–26–11
61	T	February 28, 1979	4–4	@ Vancouver Canucks (1978–79)	23–26–12

March

Game	Result	Date	Score	Opponent	Record
62	W	March 2, 1979	4–0	@ Colorado Rockies (1978–79)	24–26–12
63	L	March 3, 1979	5–8	@ Los Angeles Kings (1978–79)	24–27–12
64	W	March 8, 1979	5–1	@ Philadelphia Flyers (1978–79)	25–27–12
65	L	March 10, 1979	1–7	@ New York Islanders (1978–79)	25–28–12
66	L	March 11, 1979	2–5	@ New York Rangers (1978–79)	25–29–12
67	L	March 14, 1979	0–4	Philadelphia Flyers (1978–79)	25–30–12
68	L	March 17, 1979	2–4	@ Boston Bruins (1978–79)	25–31–12
69	L	March 18, 1979	2–4	Detroit Red Wings (1978–79)	25–32–12
70	L	March 20, 1979	3–5	@ Detroit Red Wings (1978–79)	25–33–12
71	L	March 21, 1979	6–7	New York Rangers (1978–79)	25–34–12
72	T	March 24, 1979	3–3	@ Toronto Maple Leafs (1978–79)	25–34–13
73	W	March 25, 1979	3–0	Colorado Rockies (1978–79)	26–34–13
74	T	March 27, 1979	1–1	@ Colorado Rockies (1978–79)	26–34–14
75	W	March 29, 1979	6–1	New York Islanders (1978–79)	27–34–14

April

Game	Result	Date	Score	Opponent	Record
76	T	April 1, 1979	2–2	Vancouver Canucks (1978–79)	27–34–15
77	L	April 3, 1979	3–4	@ Minnesota North Stars (1978–79)	27–35–15
78	W	April 4, 1979	7–1	Minnesota North Stars (1978–79)	28–35–15
79	L	April 7, 1979	1–4	@ St. Louis Blues (1978–79)	28–36–15
80	W	April 8, 1979	3–2	St. Louis Blues (1978–79)	29–36–15

Legend: Win (2 points) Loss (0 points) Tie (1 point)

== Playoffs ==
Since the Hawks won their division, they were given a bye in the NHL preliminary round, and advanced straight to the NHL quarter-finals. Their first round opponent was the New York Islanders, who finished with the best record in the NHL, going 51–15–14, earning 116 points and winning the Patrick Division. The series opened with two games at Nassau Veterans Memorial Coliseum on Long Island, New York, with the Islanders, led by a Mike Bossy hat trick, easily defeated Chicago 6–2. The second game was decided in overtime, after the two teams played through three scoreless periods. The Islanders Mike Bossy scored his fourth goal of the series in overtime to give New York the 1–0 victory, and a 2–0 series lead. Black Hawks goaltender Tony Esposito made 39 saves in the loss, while Islanders goaltender Billy Smith stopped all 22 shots he faced. The series moved to Chicago Stadium for the next two games. In the third game, the Islanders once again shutout the Black Hawks, this time with goaltender Chico Resch making 21 saves for the shutout, as New York defeated the Hawks 4–0 to take a 3–0 series lead. The Islanders would complete the sweep in the fourth game, winning 3–1, and sending the Blackhawks to their sixteenth consecutive playoff loss.

1979 Stanley Cup playoffs
Preliminary round vs. (N4) New York Islanders – Islanders win 4–0

Game	Date	Visitor	Score	Home	Series
1	April 16	Chicago Black Hawks	2–6	New York Islanders	0–1
2	April 18	Chicago Black Hawks	0–1	New York Islanders	0–2
3	April 20	New York Islanders	4–0	Chicago Black Hawks	0–3
4	April 22	New York Islanders	3–1	Chicago Black Hawks	0–4

Legend: Win Loss

== Player stats ==
=== Regular season ===
Scoring

Player	Pos	GP	G	A	Pts	PIM	+/-	PPG	SHG	GWG
Ivan Boldirev	C	66	29	35	64	25	7	10	0	4
Stan Mikita	C/RW	65	19	36	55	34	3	4	0	1
Bob Murray	D	79	19	32	51	38	4	4	1	0
Ted Bulley	LW	75	27	23	50	153	18	1	0	8
John Marks	LW	80	21	24	45	35	2	4	0	2
Reg Kerr	LW	73	16	24	40	50	-7	2	2	4
J.P. Bordeleau	RW	63	15	21	36	34	-7	2	1	2
Grant Mulvey	RW	80	19	15	34	99	-14	5	0	1
Cliff Koroll	RW	78	12	19	31	20	3	1	2	2
Phil Russell	D	66	8	23	31	122	-7	1	1	1
Darcy Rota	LW	63	13	17	30	77	-10	1	0	1
Doug Wilson	D	56	5	21	26	37	4	2	1	0
Mike O'Connell	D	48	4	22	26	20	-1	1	0	0
Alain Daigle	RW	74	11	14	25	55	2	0	0	0
Tim Higgins	RW	36	7	16	23	30	6	0	0	1
Dave Logan	D	76	1	14	15	176	-9	0	0	0
Tom Lysiak	C	14	0	10	10	14	3	0	0	0
Mike Walton	C	26	6	3	9	4	-4	3	0	1
Jim Harrison	C	21	4	5	9	22	-6	0	0	0
Doug Hicks	D	44	1	8	9	15	-12	0	0	0
Bob Kelly	LW	63	2	5	7	85	-10	0	0	0
Keith Magnuson	D	26	1	4	5	41	-4	0	0	0
Greg Fox	D	14	0	5	5	16	9	0	0	0
Bobby Orr	D	6	2	2	4	4	2	0	0	0
Pat Ribble	D	12	1	3	4	8	7	0	0	1
Harold Phillipoff	LW	14	0	4	4	6	-4	0	0	0
Bob Hoffmeyer	D	6	0	2	2	5	-4	0	0	0
Doug Lecuyer	LW	2	1	0	1	0	-1	0	0	0
Tony Esposito	G	63	0	1	1	2	0	0	0	0
Jean Savard	C	11	0	1	1	9	-2	0	0	0
Mike Veisor	G	17	0	1	1	0	0	0	0	0
Miles Zaharko	D	1	0	0	0	0	0	0	0	0

Goaltending

Player	MIN	GP	W	L	T	GA	GAA	SO
Tony Esposito	3780	63	24	28	11	206	3.27	4
Mike Veisor	1020	17	5	8	4	60	3.53	0
Team:	4800	80	29	36	15	266	3.32	4

=== Playoffs ===
Scoring

Player	Pos	GP	G	A	Pts	PIM	PPG	SHG	GWG
Reg Kerr	LW	4	1	0	1	5	0	0	0
Bob Murray	D	4	1	0	1	6	0	0	0
Mike Walton	C	4	1	0	1	0	0	0	0
J. P. Bordeleau	RW	4	0	1	1	2	0	0	0
Greg Fox	D	4	0	1	1	0	0	0	0
Rick Paterson	C	1	0	1	1	0	0	0	0
Harold Phillipoff	LW	4	0	1	1	7	0	0	0
Kirk Bowman	LW	2	0	0	0	0	0	0	0
Ted Bulley	LW	2	0	0	0	0	0	0	0
Alain Daigle	RW	4	0	0	0	0	0	0	0
Tony Esposito	G	4	0	0	0	0	0	0	0
Tim Higgins	RW	4	0	0	0	0	0	0	0
Bob Kelly	LW	4	0	0	0	9	0	0	0
Cliff Koroll	RW	4	0	0	0	0	0	0	0
Dave Logan	D	4	0	0	0	2	0	0	0
Tom Lysiak	C	4	0	0	0	2	0	0	0
John Marks	LW	4	0	0	0	2	0	0	0
Grant Mulvey	RW	1	0	0	0	2	0	0	0
Mike O'Connell	D	4	0	0	0	4	0	0	0
Pat Ribble	D	4	0	0	0	4	0	0	0

Goaltending

Player	MIN	GP	W	L	GA	GAA	SO
Tony Esposito	243	4	0	4	14	3.46	0
Team:	243	4	0	4	14	3.46	0

Note: Pos = Position; GP = Games played; G = Goals; A = Assists; Pts = Points; +/- = plus/minus; PIM = Penalty minutes; PPG = Power-play goals; SHG = Short-handed goals; GWG = Game-winning goals
MIN = Minutes played; W = Wins; L = Losses; T = Ties; GA = Goals-against; GAA = Goals-against average; SO = Shutouts;

== Draft picks ==
Chicago's draft picks at the 1978 NHL amateur draft held at the Queen Elizabeth Hotel in Montreal.

Round	#	Player	Nationality	College/Junior/Club team (League)
1	10	Tim Higgins	Canada	Ottawa 67's (OMJHL)
2	29	Doug Lecuyer	Canada	Portland Winterhawks (WCHL)
3	46	Rick Paterson	Canada	Cornwall Royals (QMJHL)
4	63	Brian Young	Canada	New Westminster Bruins (WCHL)
5	79	Mark Murphy	Canada	Sault Ste. Marie Greyhounds (OMJHL)
6	96	Dave Feamster	United States	Colorado College (WCHA)
7	113	Dave Mancuso	Canada	Windsor Spitfires (OMJHL)
8	130	Sandy Ross	Canada	Colgate University (ECAC)
9	147	Mark Locken	Canada	Niagara Falls Flyers (OMJHL)
10	164	Glenn Van	United States	Colorado College (WCHA)
11	179	Darryl Sutter	Canada	Lethbridge Broncos (WCHL)

== See also ==
- 1978–79 NHL season
