= 1978–79 NHL season =

National Hockey League season

- League: National Hockey League
- Sport: Ice hockey
- Duration: October 11, 1978 – May 21, 1979
- Games: 80
- Teams: 17
- TV partner(s): CBC, SRC (Canada); NHL Network, CBS, (Note: CBS only televised the February 10 Challenge Cup game.) ABC (Note: ABC was contracted to only televise Game 7 of the Stanley Cup Final, but the Final ended in five games.) (United States)

Draft
- Top draft pick: Bobby Smith
- Picked by: Minnesota North Stars

Regular season
- Season champions: New York Islanders
- Season MVP: Bryan Trottier (Islanders)
- Top scorer: Bryan Trottier (Islanders)

Playoffs
- Playoffs MVP: Bob Gainey (Canadiens)

Stanley Cup
- Champions: Montreal Canadiens
- Runners-up: New York Rangers

NHL seasons
- 1977–78 1979–80

The 1978–79 NHL season was the 62nd season of the National Hockey League. The Montreal Canadiens beat the New York Rangers in the Stanley Cup Final four games to one for their fourth consecutive Cup; two "Original Six" teams did not meet again in the Final for the next 34 years, when the Chicago Blackhawks defeated the Boston Bruins in the 2013 Final. The Bruins faced the Canadiens in the 1979 semifinals, marking the last appearance by three Original Six teams in the final four for the next 35 years, when the Blackhawks, Canadiens and Rangers reached the semifinals of the 2014 playoffs.

The Cleveland Barons merged with the Minnesota North Stars (continuing as the North Stars), reducing the NHL membership to 17 teams, the last time that a league in the "big four" major professional sports league contracted.

== League business ==
This season saw the first reduction in the total number of teams since the Brooklyn Americans folded following the 1941–42 season. Fearing that two teams were on the verge of folding, the league approved the merger of the financially unstable Cleveland Barons and Minnesota North Stars franchises, reducing the number of teams to 17. The merged team continued as the Minnesota North Stars but assumed the Barons' place in the Adams Division.

This reduction was only temporary, however, as negotiations continued toward an agreement with the World Hockey Association that would see it fold following this season, with four of its teams joining the NHL as expansion franchises for 1979–80.

A dispersal draft was then held on June 15, 1978. The merged North Stars was allowed to protect 14 players, then the five other worst teams in the previous 1977–78 season each had the option to pick one of the unprotected players.

The 1978 NHL amateur draft was also held on June 15, at the Queen Elizabeth Hotel in Montreal, Quebec. Bobby Smith was selected first overall by the North Stars.

For the first time since the NHL All-Star Game became an annual tradition, it was not played. In its stead was the 1979 Challenge Cup, which saw Soviet Union players come over to North America to play against NHL players. The Soviets won the series two games to one.

== Regular season ==
For the past three seasons, the Montreal Canadiens had dominated the regular season, but times were changing. The New York Islanders had been steadily improving over the past few seasons and this season saw them beat out the Canadiens by one point for the best record in the league.

This was the last season until the 2005–06 season that the St. Louis Blues missed the playoffs.

=== Final standings ===
GP = Games Played, W = Wins, L = Losses, T = Ties, Pts = Points, GF = Goals For, GA = Goals Against, PIM = Penalties In Minutes
Teams that qualified for the playoffs are highlighted in bold

==== Prince of Wales Conference ====
Adams Division
	GP	W	L	T	GF	GA	Pts
**Boston Bruins**	80	43	23	14	316	270	100
**Buffalo Sabres**	80	36	28	16	280	263	88
**Toronto Maple Leafs**	80	34	33	13	267	252	81
Minnesota North Stars	80	28	40	12	257	289	68

Norris Division
	GP	W	L	T	GF	GA	Pts
**Montreal Canadiens**	80	52	17	11	337	204	115
**Pittsburgh Penguins**	80	36	31	13	281	279	85
**Los Angeles Kings**	80	34	34	12	292	286	80
Washington Capitals	80	24	41	15	273	338	63
Detroit Red Wings	80	23	41	16	252	295	62

Note: W = Wins, L = Losses, T = Ties, GF = Goals For, GA = Goals Against, Pts = Points
Teams that qualified for the playoffs are highlighted in bold.

==== Clarence Campbell Conference ====
Patrick Division
	GP	W	L	T	GF	GA	Pts
**New York Islanders**	80	51	15	14	358	214	116
**Philadelphia Flyers**	80	40	25	15	281	248	95
**New York Rangers**	80	40	29	11	316	292	91
**Atlanta Flames**	80	41	31	8	327	280	90

Smythe Division
	GP	W	L	T	GF	GA	Pts
**Chicago Black Hawks**	80	29	36	15	244	277	73
**Vancouver Canucks**	80	25	42	13	217	291	63
St. Louis Blues	80	18	50	12	249	348	48
Colorado Rockies	80	15	53	12	210	331	42

== Playoffs ==
=== Bracket ===
The NHL used "re-seeding" instead of a fixed bracket playoff system: in each round, the highest remaining seed was matched against the lowest remaining seed, the second-highest remaining seed played the second-lowest remaining seed, and so forth.

Regardless of playoff seed, all four division winners received a bye to the quarterfinals. Each series in the preliminary round was played in a best-of-three format while each series in the other three rounds were played in a best-of-seven format (scores in the bracket indicate the number of games won in each series).

Preliminary round
1	Philadelphia	2
8	Vancouver	1
2	NY Rangers	2
7	Los Angeles	0
3	Atlanta	0
6	Toronto	2
4	Buffalo	1
5	Pittsburgh	2

Quarterfinals
1	NY Islanders	4
8	Chicago	0
4	Philadelphia	1
5	NY Rangers	4
2	Montreal	4
7	Toronto	0
3	Boston	4
6	Pittsburgh	0

Semifinals
1	NY Islanders	2
4	NY Rangers	4
2	Montreal	4
3	Boston	3

Stanley Cup Final
2	Montreal	4
4	NY Rangers	1

== Awards ==
1979 NHL awards
Prince of Wales Trophy: (Wales Conference regular season champion)	Montreal Canadiens
Clarence S. Campbell Bowl: (Campbell Conference regular season champion)	New York Islanders
Art Ross Trophy: (Top scorer, regular season)	Bryan Trottier, New York Islanders
Bill Masterton Memorial Trophy: (Perseverance, sportsmanship, and dedication)	Serge Savard, Montreal Canadiens
Calder Memorial Trophy: (Top first-year player)	Bobby Smith, Minnesota North Stars
Conn Smythe Trophy: (Most valuable player, playoffs)	Bob Gainey, Montreal Canadiens
Frank J. Selke Trophy: (Best defensive forward)	Bob Gainey, Montreal Canadiens
Hart Memorial Trophy: (Most valuable player, regular season)	Bryan Trottier, New York Islanders
Jack Adams Award: (Best coach)	Al Arbour, New York Islanders
James Norris Memorial Trophy: (Best defenceman)	Denis Potvin, New York Islanders
Lady Byng Memorial Trophy: (Excellence and sportsmanship)	Bob MacMillan, Atlanta Flames
Lester B. Pearson Award: (Outstanding player, regular season)	Marcel Dionne, Los Angeles Kings
Vezina Trophy: (Goaltender(s) of team(s) with best goaltending record)	Ken Dryden & Michel Larocque, Montreal Canadiens

=== All-Star teams ===
First team	Position	Second team
Ken Dryden, Montreal Canadiens	G	Glenn Resch, New York Islanders
Denis Potvin, New York Islanders	D	Borje Salming, Toronto Maple Leafs
Larry Robinson, Montreal Canadiens	D	Serge Savard, Montreal Canadiens
Bryan Trottier, New York Islanders	C	Marcel Dionne, Los Angeles Kings
Guy Lafleur, Montreal Canadiens	RW	Mike Bossy, New York Islanders
Clark Gillies, New York Islanders	LW	Bill Barber, Philadelphia Flyers

== Player statistics ==
=== Scoring leaders ===
GP = Games Played, G = Goals, A = Assists, Pts = Points, PIM = Penalties In Minutes

Player	Team	GP	G	A	Pts	PIM
Bryan Trottier	New York Islanders	76	47	87	134	50
Marcel Dionne	Los Angeles Kings	80	59	71	130	30
Guy Lafleur	Montreal Canadiens	80	52	77	129	28
Mike Bossy	New York Islanders	80	69	57	126	25
Bob MacMillan	Atlanta Flames	79	37	71	108	14
Guy Chouinard	Atlanta Flames	80	50	57	107	14
Denis Potvin	New York Islanders	73	31	70	101	58
Bernie Federko	St. Louis Blues	74	31	64	95	14
Dave Taylor	Los Angeles Kings	78	43	48	91	124
Clark Gillies	New York Islanders	75	35	56	91	68

Source: NHL.

=== Leading goaltenders ===
Note: GP = Games played; Min = Minutes played; GA = Goals against; GAA = Goals against average; W = Wins; L = Losses; T = Ties; SO = Shutouts

Player	Team	GP	MIN	GA	GAA	W	L	T	SO
Ken Dryden	Montreal Canadiens	47	2814	108	2.30	30	10	7	5
Chico Resch	N.Y. Islanders	43	2539	106	2.50	26	7	10	2
Bernie Parent	Philadelphia Flyers	36	1979	89	2.70	16	12	7	4
Michel Larocque	Montreal Canadiens	34	1986	94	2.84	22	7	4	3
Billy Smith	N.Y. Islanders	40	2261	108	2.87	25	8	4	1
Mike Palmateer	Toronto Maple Leafs	58	3396	167	2.95	26	21	10	4
Don Edwards	Buffalo Sabres	54	3160	159	3.02	26	18	9	2
Mario Lessard	L.A. Kings	49	2860	148	3.10	23	15	10	4
Glen Hanlon	Vancouver Canucks	31	1821	94	3.10	12	13	5	3
Gerry Cheevers	Boston Bruins	43	2509	132	3.16	23	9	10	1

=== Other statistics ===
Plus-minus

- Bryan Trottier, New York Islanders

== Coaches ==
=== Patrick Division ===
- Atlanta Flames: Fred Creighton
- New York Islanders: Al Arbour
- New York Rangers: Fred Shero
- Philadelphia Flyers: Bob McCammon and Pat Quinn

=== Adams Division ===
- Boston Bruins: Don Cherry
- Buffalo Sabres: Billy Inglis
- Minnesota North Stars: Harry Howell and Glen Sonmor
- Toronto Maple Leafs: Roger Neilson

=== Norris Division ===
- Detroit Red Wings: Bobby Kromm
- Los Angeles Kings: Bob Berry
- Montreal Canadiens: Scotty Bowman
- Pittsburgh Penguins: Johnny Wilson
- Washington Capitals: Danny Belisle

=== Smythe Division ===
- Chicago Black Hawks: Bill White
- Colorado Rockies: Pat Kelly
- St. Louis Blues: Barclay Plager
- Vancouver Canucks: Harry Neale

== Milestones ==
=== Debuts ===
The following is a list of players of note who played their first NHL game in 1978–79 (listed with their first team, asterisk (*) marks debut in playoffs):

- Joel Quenneville, Toronto Maple Leafs
- Brad Marsh, Atlanta Flames
- Reggie Lemelin, Atlanta Flames
- Al Secord, Boston Bruins
- Bobby Smith, Minnesota North Stars
- Steve Payne, Minnesota North Stars
- Rod Langway §, Montreal Canadiens
- John Tonelli §, New York Islanders
- Anders Hedberg §, New York Rangers
- Ulf Nilsson §, New York Rangers
- Ken Linseman §, Philadelphia Flyers
- Pete Peeters, Philadelphia Flyers
- Greg Millen, Pittsburgh Penguins
- Wayne Babych, St. Louis Blues
- Curt Fraser, Vancouver Canucks
- Thomas Gradin, Vancouver Canucks
- Stan Smyl, Vancouver Canucks
- Ryan Walter, Washington Capitals

Players marked with § began their major professional career in the World Hockey Association.

=== Last games ===
The following is a list of players of note that played their last game in the NHL in 1978–79 (listed with their last team):

- Bobby Orr, Chicago Black Hawks
- Joe Watson, Colorado Rockies
- Danny Grant, Los Angeles Kings
- J. P. Parise, Minnesota North Stars
- Jacques Lemaire, Montreal Canadiens
- Ken Dryden, Montreal Canadiens
- Yvan Cournoyer, Montreal Canadiens
- Ed Westfall, New York Islanders
- Bernie Parent, Philadelphia Flyers
- Garry Monahan, Toronto Maple Leafs
- Pit Martin, Vancouver Canucks

== Broadcasting ==
Hockey Night in Canada on CBC Television televised Saturday night regular season games and Stanley Cup playoff games.

In the U.S., this was the fourth and final season that NHL games aired in national broadcast syndication under the NHL Network package. On February 10, CBS decided to televise Game 2 of the 1979 Challenge Cup, but that was the network's only involvement in broadcasting the NHL this season. Similarly, ABC only agreed to air Game 7 of the 1979 Stanley Cup Final had the series gone that far. The league then dissolved the NHL Network after the season, signing packages of regular season slates to the fledgling cable networks ESPN and UA-Columbia (later known as the USA Network). The Hughes Television Network, the NHL Network's distributor, also signed a new deal for regular season and postseason games.

== See also ==
- List of Stanley Cup champions
- 1978 NHL amateur draft
- 1978–79 NHL transactions
- 1979 Challenge Cup
- 1978–79 WHA season
- Lester Patrick Trophy
- 1978 in sports
- 1979 in sports
