= 1978–79 Atlanta Flames season =

NHL team season

1978–79 Atlanta Flames
- Division: 4th Patrick
- Conference: 4th Campbell
- 1978–79 record: 41–31–8
- Home record: 25–11–4
- Road record: 16–20–4
- Goals for: 327
- Goals against: 280

Team information
- General manager: Cliff Fletcher
- Coach: Fred Creighton
- Captain: Tom Lysiak
- Alternate captains: None
- Arena: Omni Coliseum

Team leaders
- Goals: Guy Chouinard (50)
- Assists: Bob MacMillan (71)
- Points: Bob MacMillan (108)
- Penalty minutes: Willi Plett (213)
- Wins: Dan Bouchard (32)
- Goals against average: Reggie Lemelin (3.32)

The 1978–79 Atlanta Flames season was the seventh season for the franchise.

== Regular season ==
=== Final standings ===
Patrick Division
	GP	W	L	T	GF	GA	Pts
New York Islanders	80	51	15	14	358	214	116
Philadelphia Flyers	80	40	25	15	281	248	95
New York Rangers	80	40	29	11	316	292	91
Atlanta Flames	80	41	31	8	327	280	90

=== Record vs. opponents ===
Patrick Division record vs. opponents

Vs. Campbell Conference

Vs. Wales Conference

Vs. Patrick Division

1978–79 NHL records
Team	ATL	NYI	NYR	PHI	Total
Atlanta	—	2–6	4–3–1	4–4	10–13–1
N.Y. Islanders	6–2	—	5–3	5–1–2	16–6–2
N.Y. Rangers	3–4–1	3–5	—	2–3–3	8–12–4
Philadelphia	4–4	1–5–2	3–2–3	—	8–11–5

Vs. Smythe Division

1978–79 NHL records
Team	CHI	COL	STL	VAN	Total
Atlanta	2–1–2	4–0	4–1	2–2	12–4–2
N.Y. Islanders	3–2	4–0–1	3–0–2	4–0	14–2–3
N.Y. Rangers	4–0	4–1	3–2	4–0	15–3–0
Philadelphia	1–3	3–0–1	4–1	2–1–1	10–5–2

Vs. Adams Division

1978–79 NHL records
Team	BOS	BUF	MIN	TOR	Total
Atlanta	1–3	2–2–1	1–2–1	4–1	8–8–2
N.Y. Islanders	2–1–2	1–2–1	3–1	3–1	9–5–3
N.Y. Rangers	2–3	2–1–1	1–2–1	2–2–1	7–8–3
Philadelphia	3–1–1	3–0–2	2–2	2–2–1	10–5–4

Vs. Norris Division

1978–79 NHL records
Team	DET	LAK	MTL	PIT	WSH	Total
Atlanta	3–0–1	2–2	1–3	3–0–1	2–1–1	11–6–3
N.Y. Islanders	3–0–1	2–0–2	3–1	1–0–3	3–1	12–2–6
N.Y. Rangers	1–1–2	3–1	3–1	2–2	1–1–2	10–6–4
Philadelphia	2–0–2	4–0	0–3–1	3–1	3–0–1	12–4–4

== Schedule and results ==
1978–79 regular season
October

Game	Result	Date	Score	Opponent	Record	Attendance
1	T	October 11, 1978	4–4	@ Chicago Black Hawks (1978–79)	0–0–1	9,107
2	T	October 13, 1978	3–3	Washington Capitals (1978–79)	0–0–2	13,062
3	W	October 14, 1978	6–3	@ Washington Capitals (1978–79)	1–0–2	9,243
4	W	October 17, 1978	8–2	Colorado Rockies (1978–79)	2–0–2	6,127
5	W	October 20, 1978	7–5	Montreal Canadiens (1978–79)	3–0–2	12,611
6	W	October 22, 1978	5–2	@ Philadelphia Flyers (1978–79)	4–0–2	17,077
7	W	October 24, 1978	7–2	Los Angeles Kings (1978–79)	5–0–2	8,526
8	W	October 27, 1978	8–5	New York Islanders (1978–79)	6–0–2	15,061
9	W	October 28, 1978	4–2	@ Pittsburgh Penguins (1978–79)	7–0–2	10,504
10	W	October 31, 1978	5–2	@ St. Louis Blues (1978–79)	8–0–2	9,636

November

Game	Result	Date	Score	Opponent	Record	Attendance
11	W	November 1, 1978	3–0	Philadelphia Flyers (1978–79)	9–0–2	13,136
12	W	November 3, 1978	2–0	Pittsburgh Penguins (1978–79)	10–0–2	14,169
13	L	November 4, 1978	2–4	@ Montreal Canadiens (1978–79)	10–1–2	17,230
14	W	November 7, 1978	4–2	Vancouver Canucks (1978–79)	11–1–2	9,581
15	W	November 10, 1978	5–3	Chicago Black Hawks (1978–79)	12–1–2	14,811
16	L	November 11, 1978	2–4	@ New York Islanders (1978–79)	12–2–2	14,995
17	L	November 14, 1978	7–8	@ Washington Capitals (1978–79)	12–3–2	6,149
18	W	November 15, 1978	5–3	Detroit Red Wings (1978–79)	13–3–2	9,157
19	L	November 17, 1978	2–6	Boston Bruins (1978–79)	13–4–2	15,155
20	W	November 19, 1978	3–1	@ New York Rangers (1978–79)	14–4–2	17,409
21	L	November 21, 1978	3–4	Toronto Maple Leafs (1978–79)	14–5–2	9,642
22	W	November 24, 1978	4–1	St. Louis Blues (1978–79)	15–5–2	15,017
23	L	November 26, 1978	2–4	@ Boston Bruins (1978–79)	15–6–2	13,961
24	L	November 29, 1978	3–5	New York Rangers (1978–79)	15–7–2	10,247

December

Game	Result	Date	Score	Opponent	Record	Attendance
25	L	December 1, 1978	3–4	Minnesota North Stars (1978–79)	15–8–2	9,419
26	L	December 2, 1978	3–5	@ Minnesota North Stars (1978–79)	15–9–2	8,561
27	L	December 5, 1978	0–3	@ Vancouver Canucks (1978–79)	15–10–2	14,151
28	W	December 8, 1978	4–3	@ Colorado Rockies (1978–79)	16–10–2	4,897
29	L	December 9, 1978	1–5	@ Los Angeles Kings (1978–79)	16–11–2	10,009
30	T	December 13, 1978	5–5	@ Detroit Red Wings (1978–79)	16–11–3	15,023
31	W	December 14, 1978	5–3	Colorado Rockies (1978–79)	17–11–3	7,242
32	W	December 16, 1978	7–2	Philadelphia Flyers (1978–79)	18–11–3	12,384
33	L	December 19, 1978	4–7	@ St. Louis Blues (1978–79)	18–12–3	7,337
34	L	December 21, 1978	4–5	@ Buffalo Sabres (1978–79)	18–13–3	16,433
35	W	December 22, 1978	3–1	Toronto Maple Leafs (1978–79)	19–13–3	9,422
36	L	December 26, 1978	3–5	New York Rangers (1978–79)	19–14–3	10,546
37	L	December 28, 1978	4–10	New York Islanders (1978–79)	19–15–3	12,377
38	L	December 30, 1978	2–4	@ New York Islanders (1978–79)	19–16–3	14,995
39	W	December 31, 1978	6–5	@ New York Rangers (1978–79)	20–16–3	17,390

January

Game	Result	Date	Score	Opponent	Record	Attendance
40	W	January 3, 1979	4–1	@ Toronto Maple Leafs (1978–79)	21–16–3	16,485
41	T	January 5, 1979	3–3	Pittsburgh Penguins (1978–79)	21–16–4	11,463
42	W	January 9, 1979	5–3	Buffalo Sabres (1978–79)	22–16–4	9,062
43	L	January 12, 1979	1–4	New York Islanders (1978–79)	22–17–4	13,147
44	L	January 14, 1979	4–6	New York Rangers (1978–79)	22–18–4	9,522
45	W	January 16, 1979	5–0	Philadelphia Flyers (1978–79)	23–18–4	9,198
46	W	January 19, 1979	6–1	Chicago Black Hawks (1978–79)	24–18–4	10,389
47	W	January 20, 1979	4–3	@ Detroit Red Wings (1978–79)	25–18–4	14,748
48	L	January 22, 1979	1–3	@ Boston Bruins (1978–79)	25–19–4	13,064
49	L	January 25, 1979	0–6	@ Montreal Canadiens (1978–79)	25–20–4	17,029
50	W	January 26, 1979	4–2	Toronto Maple Leafs (1978–79)	26–20–4	12,042
51	W	January 28, 1979	7–2	Detroit Red Wings (1978–79)	27–20–4	10,147
52	W	January 31, 1979	5–2	@ Buffalo Sabres (1978–79)	28–20–4	16,433

February

Game	Result	Date	Score	Opponent	Record	Attendance
53	W	February 1, 1979	4–1	Vancouver Canucks (1978–79)	29–20–4	8,931
54	L	February 3, 1979	2–4	Chicago Black Hawks (1978–79)	29–21–4	14,247
55	L	February 4, 1979	4–7	@ Philadelphia Flyers (1978–79)	29–22–4	17,077
56	T	February 14, 1979	4–4	@ Chicago Black Hawks (1978–79)	29–22–5	7,674
57	W	February 17, 1979	5–1	@ Colorado Rockies (1978–79)	30–22–5	7,675
58	W	February 18, 1979	6–4	@ St. Louis Blues (1978–79)	31–22–5	11,284
59	W	February 20, 1979	5–3	Washington Capitals (1978–79)	32–22–5	8,837
60	T	February 23, 1979	2–2	Minnesota North Stars (1978–79)	32–22–6	13,185
61	W	February 24, 1979	6–3	@ Minnesota North Stars (1978–79)	33–22–6	15,086
62	W	February 28, 1979	6–4	@ Toronto Maple Leafs (1978–79)	34–22–6	16,485

March

Game	Result	Date	Score	Opponent	Record	Attendance
63	W	March 2, 1979	3–2	New York Islanders (1978–79)	35–22–6	14,620
64	L	March 3, 1979	2–4	@ New York Islanders (1978–79)	35–23–6	14,995
65	W	March 8, 1979	7–5	Boston Bruins (1978–79)	36–23–6	11,709
66	T	March 10, 1979	5–5	Buffalo Sabres (1978–79)	36–23–7	13,622
67	L	March 11, 1979	4–9	@ Buffalo Sabres (1978–79)	36–24–7	16,433
68	W	March 14, 1979	6–4	@ New York Rangers (1978–79)	37–24–7	17,405
69	L	March 15, 1979	4–5	@ Philadelphia Flyers (1978–79)	37–25–7	17,077
70	L	March 18, 1979	1–2	@ Vancouver Canucks (1978–79)	37–26–7	12,962
71	L	March 20, 1979	3–4	@ Los Angeles Kings (1978–79)	37–27–7	9,792
72	L	March 23, 1979	1–4	Philadelphia Flyers (1978–79)	37–28–7	15,155
73	W	March 25, 1979	8–2	St. Louis Blues (1978–79)	38–28–7	9,343
74	L	March 27, 1979	4–6	Montreal Canadiens (1978–79)	38–29–7	11,592
75	W	March 30, 1979	5–3	Los Angeles Kings (1978–79)	39–29–7	10,292

April

Game	Result	Date	Score	Opponent	Record	Attendance
76	W	April 1, 1979	7–2	@ Pittsburgh Penguins (1978–79)	40–29–7	13,798
77	L	April 3, 1979	2–3	@ New York Islanders (1978–79)	40–30–7	14,995
78	T	April 4, 1979	3–3	@ New York Rangers (1978–79)	40–30–8	17,414
79	W	April 6, 1979	9–2	New York Rangers (1978–79)	41–30–8	13,455
80	L	April 8, 1979	2–4	@ Philadelphia Flyers (1978–79)	41–31–8	17,077

Legend: Win (2 points) Loss (0 points) Tie (1 point)

== Player statistics ==
=== Skaters ===
Note: GP = Games played; G = Goals; A = Assists; Pts = Points; PIM = Penalty minutes

		Regular season					Playoffs
Player	#	GP	G	A	Pts	PIM	GP	G	A	Pts	PIM
Bob MacMillan	11	79	37	71	108	14	2	0	1	1	0
Guy Chouinard	16	80	50	57	107	14	2	1	2	3	0
Eric Vail	27	80	35	48	83	53	2	0	1	1	2
Jean Pronovost	9	75	28	39	67	30	2	2	0	2	0
Tom Lysiak^{‡}	12	52	23	35	58	36	–	–	–	–	-
Bobby Lalonde	7	78	24	32	56	36	2	1	0	1	0
Ken Houston	6	80	21	31	52	135	1	0	0	0	16
Willi Plett	25	74	23	20	43	213	2	1	0	1	29
Bill Clement	10	65	12	23	35	14	2	0	0	0	0
Red Laurence	17	59	14	20	34	6	–	–	–	–	-
Harold Phillipoff^{‡}	24	51	9	17	26	113	–	–	–	–	-
Dave Shand	8	79	4	22	26	64	2	0	0	0	20
Ed Kea	19	53	6	18	24	40	2	0	0	0	0
Pat Ribble^{‡}	3	66	5	16	21	69	–	–	–	–	-
Brad Marsh	5	80	0	19	19	101	2	0	0	0	17
Bob Murdoch^{†}	20	35	5	11	16	24	2	0	0	0	4
John Gould	21	61	8	7	15	18	2	0	0	0	0
Richard Mulhern^{‡}	4	37	3	12	15	22	–	–	–	–	-
Darcy Rota^{†}	18	13	9	5	14	21	2	0	1	1	26
Ivan Boldirev^{†}	12	13	6	8	14	6	2	0	2	2	2
Greg Fox^{‡}	2	64	0	12	12	70	–	–	–	–	-
Gene Carr	14	30	3	8	11	6	1	0	0	0
Phil Russell^{†}	2	13	1	6	7	28	2	0	0	0	9
Rod Seiling^{†}	15	36	0	4	4	12	2	0	0	0	0
Dan Bouchard	30	64	0	3	3	17	2	0	0	0	4
Gerry O'Flaherty	18	1	1	0	1	2	–	–	–	–	-
Yves Belanger	31	5	0	0	0	0	–	–	–	–	-
Reggie Lemelin	1	18	0	0	0	4	1	0	1	1	0

^{†}Denotes player spent time with another team before joining Atlanta. Stats reflect time with the Flames only.
^{‡}Traded mid-season.

=== Goaltending ===
Note: GP = Games played; TOI = Time on ice (minutes); W = Wins; L = Losses; OT = Overtime/shootout losses; GA = Goals against; SO = Shutouts; GAA = Goals against average

		Regular season								Playoffs
Player	#	GP	TOI	W	L	T	GA	SO	GAA	GP	TOI	W	L	GA	SO	GAA
Reggie Lemelin	1	18	994	8	8	1	55	0	3.32	1	20	0	0	0	0	0.00
Dan Bouchard	30	64	3624	32	21	7	201	3	3.33	2	100	0	2	9	0	5.40
Yves Belanger	31	5	182	1	2	0	21	0	6.92	–	–	–	–	–	–	-.--

== Transactions ==
The Flames were involved in the following transactions during the 1978–79 season.

=== Trades ===
September 6, 1978	To Atlanta Flames Gregg Sheppard	To Boston Bruins Dick Redmond
September 6, 1978	To Atlanta Flames Jean Pronovost	To Pittsburgh Penguins Gregg Sheppard
October 10, 1978	To Atlanta Flames Gerry O'Flaherty	To Minnesota North Stars Cash
November 4, 1978	To Atlanta Flames Rod Seiling	To St. Louis Blues Cash
January 16, 1979	To Atlanta Flames Bob Murdoch; 2nd round pick in 1980 (Tony Curtale)	To Los Angeles Kings Richard Mulhern; 2nd round pick in 1980 (Dave Morrison)
March 13, 1979	To Atlanta Flames Ivan Boldirev; Darcy Rota; Phil Russell	To Chicago Black Hawks Greg Fox; Tom Lysiak; Harold Phillipoff; Pat Ribble; Miles Zaharko

=== Free agents ===
Player	Former team
C Gene Carr	Pittsburgh Penguins
G Reggie Lemelin	Philadelphia Flyers

Player	New team
C Rey Comeau	Colorado Rockies
D Ab DeMarco Jr.	Boston Bruins

== Draft picks ==
Bernhardt Engelbrecht was the first German player selected in the NHL Draft. The Flames selected him in the 12th round.

Round	Pick	Player	Nationality	College/junior/club team
1	11.	Brad Marsh (D)	Canada	London Knights (OHA)
3	47.	Tim Bernhardt (G)	Canada	Cornwall Royals (OHA)
4	64.	Jim MacRae (F)	Canada	London Knights (OHA)
5	80.	Gord Wappel (D)	Canada	Regina Pats (WCHL)
6	97.	Greg Meredith (D)	Canada	University of Notre Dame (NCAA)
7	114.	Dave Hindmarch (C)	Canada	University of Alberta (CIAU)
8	131.	Dave Morrison (RW)	Canada	Calgary Wranglers (WCHL)
9	148.	Doug Todd (RW)	Canada	University of Michigan (NCAA)
10	165.	Mark Green (C)	United States	Sherbrooke Beavers (QMJHL)
11	180.	Bob Sullivan (LW)	Canada	Toledo Goaldiggers (IHL)
12	196.	Bernhard Engelbrecht (G)	West Germany	Landshut EV (Bundesliga)
