= Norris Division =

National Hockey League division (1974–1993)

- Conference: Wales Conference (1974–1981); Campbell Conference (1981–1993)
- League: National Hockey League
- Sport: Ice hockey
- Founded: 1974
- Folded: 1993
- Replaced by: Central Division
- Most titles: Montreal Canadiens (7)

The National Hockey League's Norris Division was formed in 1974 as part of the Prince of Wales Conference. When the NHL realigned into geographic divisions in 1981, the division moved to the Clarence Campbell Conference, where it comprised the league's Great Lakes and Midwest teams, with the Detroit Red Wings being the only member to remain from the previous season. The division existed for 19 seasons until 1993. The division was named after James E. Norris, longtime owner of the Red Wings. It is the forerunner of the NHL's Central Division. Intense rivalries developed between its constituent teams, which through the 1980s were noted for enforcer-heavy squads that had poor performances – qualifying for the playoffs with .500 points percentages, and achieving no Stanley Cup titles or appearances in the finals – but great local popularity. Despite the division's reputation, the 1985–86 St. Louis Blues made an impressive Cinderella run by reaching the Conference Finals where it took the Calgary Flames 7 games to dispatch them following the Monday Night Miracle, and the 1990–91 Minnesota North Stars reached the Stanley Cup Finals.

As part of his shtick, ESPN's Chris Berman often refers to the National Football League's NFC North division (previously the NFC Central division) as the Norris Division or "NFC Norris" since the two divisions included teams from three of the same cities: Chicago, Detroit, and Minneapolis–St. Paul. The Tampa Bay Area was also briefly represented in both divisions simultaneously, during the 1992–93 NHL season.

== Division lineups ==
=== 1974–1979 ===
1974–79 Norris Division Teams
- Detroit Red Wings
- Los Angeles Kings
- Montreal Canadiens
- Pittsburgh Penguins
- Washington Capitals

==== Changes from the 1973–74 season ====
- The Norris Division is formed as a result of NHL realignment
- The Detroit Red Wings and Montreal Canadiens come from the East Division
- The Los Angeles Kings and Pittsburgh Penguins come from the West Division
- The Washington Capitals are added as an expansion team

=== 1979–1981 ===
1979–81 Norris Division Teams
- Detroit Red Wings
- Hartford Whalers
- Los Angeles Kings
- Montreal Canadiens
- Pittsburgh Penguins

==== Changes from the 1978–79 season ====
- The Hartford Whalers are granted entry into the NHL from the World Hockey Association (WHA)
- The Washington Capitals move to the Patrick Division

=== 1981–1982 ===
1981–82 Norris Division Teams
- Chicago Black Hawks
- Detroit Red Wings
- Minnesota North Stars
- St. Louis Blues
- Toronto Maple Leafs
- Winnipeg Jets

==== Changes from the 1980–81 season ====
- The Norris Division switches from the Prince of Wales Conference to the Clarence Campbell Conference
- The Hartford Whalers and Montreal Canadiens move to the Adams Division
- The Pittsburgh Penguins move to the Patrick Division
- The Los Angeles Kings move to the Smythe Division
- The Minnesota North Stars and Toronto Maple Leafs come from the Adams Division
- The Chicago Black Hawks, St. Louis Blues, and Winnipeg Jets come from the Smythe Division

=== 1982–1986 ===
1982–86 Norris Division Teams
- Chicago Black Hawks
- Detroit Red Wings
- Minnesota North Stars
- St. Louis Blues
- Toronto Maple Leafs

==== Changes from the 1981–82 season ====
- The Winnipeg Jets move back to the Smythe Division

=== 1986–1992 ===
1986–92 Norris Division Teams
- Chicago Blackhawks
- Detroit Red Wings
- Minnesota North Stars
- St. Louis Blues
- Toronto Maple Leafs

==== Changes from the 1985–86 season ====
- Chicago changes their team name from the Black Hawks to the Blackhawks

=== 1992–1993 ===
1992–93 Norris Division Teams
- Chicago Blackhawks
- Detroit Red Wings
- Minnesota North Stars
- St. Louis Blues
- Tampa Bay Lightning
- Toronto Maple Leafs

==== Changes from the 1991–92 season ====
- The Tampa Bay Lightning are added as an expansion team

=== After the 1992–93 season ===
The league was reformatted into two conferences with two divisions each:

- Eastern Conference
  - Atlantic Division
  - Northeast Division
- Western Conference
  - Central Division
  - Pacific Division

== Season results ==
^{(#)}	Denotes team that won the Stanley Cup
^{(#)}	Denotes team that won the Clarence S. Campbell Bowl, but lost Stanley Cup Final
^{(#)}	Denotes team that qualified for the Stanley Cup playoffs
‡	Denotes team with most points in the regular season (winner of the Presidents' Trophy since 1985–86)

Season	1st	2nd	3rd	4th	5th	6th
1974–75	^{(DC)} Montreal (113)	^{(1)} Los Angeles (105)	^{(3)} Pittsburgh (89)	Detroit (58)	Washington (21)	
1975–76	^{(DC)} Montreal (127)^{‡}	^{(3)} Los Angeles (85)	^{(5)} Pittsburgh (82)	Detroit (62)	Washington (32)	
1976–77	^{(DC)} Montreal (132)^{‡}	^{(3)} Los Angeles (83)	^{(4)} Pittsburgh (81)	Washington (62)	Detroit (41)	
1977–78	^{(DC)} Montreal (129)^{‡}	^{(5)} Detroit (78)	^{(6)} Los Angeles (77)	Pittsburgh (68)	Washington (48)	
1978–79	^{(DC)} Montreal (115)	^{(5)} Pittsburgh (85)	^{(7)} Los Angeles (80)	Washington (63)	Detroit (62)	
1979–80	^{(3)} Montreal (107)	^{(12)} Los Angeles (74)	^{(13)} Pittsburgh (73)	^{(14)} Hartford (73)	Detroit (63)	
1980–81	^{(3)} Montreal (103)	^{(4)} Los Angeles (99)	^{(15)} Pittsburgh (73)	Hartford (60)	Detroit (56)	
1981–82	Minnesota (94)	Winnipeg (80)	St. Louis (72)	Chicago (72)	Toronto (56)	Detroit (54)
1982–83	Chicago (104)	Minnesota (96)	Toronto (68)	St. Louis (65)	Detroit (57)	
1983–84	Minnesota (88)	St. Louis (71)	Detroit (69)	Chicago (68)	Toronto (61)	
1984–85	St. Louis (86)	Chicago (83)	Detroit (66)	Minnesota (62)	Toronto (48)	
1985–86	Chicago (86)	Minnesota (85)	St. Louis (83)	Toronto (57)	Detroit (40)	
1986–87	St. Louis (79)	Detroit (78)	Chicago (72)	Toronto (70)	Minnesota (70)	
1987–88	Detroit (93)	St. Louis (76)	Chicago (69)	Toronto (52)	Minnesota (51)	
1988–89	Detroit (80)	St. Louis (78)	Minnesota (70)	Chicago (66)	Toronto (62)	
1989–90	Chicago (88)	St. Louis (83)	Toronto (80)	Minnesota (76)	Detroit (70)	
1990–91	Chicago (106)^{‡}	St. Louis (105)	Detroit (76)	Minnesota (68)	Toronto (57)	
1991–92	Detroit (98)	Chicago (87)	St. Louis (83)	Minnesota (70)	Toronto (67)	
1992–93	Chicago (106)	Detroit (103)	Toronto (99)	St. Louis (85)	Minnesota (82)	Tampa Bay (53)

== Norris Division titles won by team ==
Team	Wins	Last win
Montreal Canadiens	7	1981
Chicago Blackhawks	5	1993
Detroit Red Wings	3	1992
Minnesota North Stars	2	1984
St. Louis Blues	2	1987
Hartford Whalers	0	—
Los Angeles Kings	0	—
Pittsburgh Penguins	0	—
Tampa Bay Lightning	0	—
Toronto Maple Leafs	0	—
Washington Capitals	0	—
Winnipeg Jets	0	—
