= 1978–79 New York Rangers season =

NHL hockey team season

1978–79 New York Rangers
- Division: 3rd Patrick
- Conference: 3rd Campbell
- 1978–79 record: 40–29–11
- Home record: 19–13–8
- Road record: 21–16–3
- Goals for: 316
- Goals against: 292

Team information
- General manager: Fred Shero
- Coach: Fred Shero
- Captain: Dave Maloney
- Alternate captains: None
- Arena: Madison Square Garden

Team leaders
- Goals: Phil Esposito (42)
- Assists: Anders Hedberg (46)
- Points: Anders Hedberg (79)
- Penalty minutes: Nick Fotiu (190)
- Wins: John Davidson (20)
- Goals against average: John Davidson (3.52)

The 1978–79 New York Rangers season was the franchise's 53rd season. The highlight of the season was participating in the Stanley Cup Final, as the Rangers played 12 consecutive playoff games without losing in regulation.

== Offseason ==
The Rangers fired their general manager John Ferguson and head coach Jean-Guy Talbot, replacing them with former Philadelphia Flyers and two-time Stanley Cup-winning coach Fred Shero.

The Rangers signed forwards Anders Hedberg and Ulf Nilsson away from the WHA's Winnipeg Jets.

The Rangers chose Don Maloney with their first pick, in the second-round, 26th over-all. Maloney was the younger brother of Dave Maloney, a defenceman with the Rangers. Don Maloney would get into 28 games for the Rangers that season.

=== New team colors ===
New Rangers colors

In 1978 the Ranger's introduced a new color scheme. While the logo and design remained the same, the Rangers changed to a much lighter shade of blue, dispensing with the dark blue that had been used since the team's inception in 1926. The Rangers would use the new colors until 1999.

== Regular season ==
=== Season standings ===
Patrick Division
	GP	W	L	T	GF	GA	Pts
New York Islanders	80	51	15	14	358	214	116
Philadelphia Flyers	80	40	25	15	281	248	95
New York Rangers	80	40	29	11	316	292	91
Atlanta Flames	80	41	31	8	327	280	90

=== Record vs. opponents ===
Patrick Division record vs. opponents

Vs. Campbell Conference

Vs. Wales Conference

Vs. Patrick Division

1978–79 NHL records
Team	ATL	NYI	NYR	PHI	Total
Atlanta	—	2–6	4–3–1	4–4	10–13–1
N.Y. Islanders	6–2	—	5–3	5–1–2	16–6–2
N.Y. Rangers	3–4–1	3–5	—	2–3–3	8–12–4
Philadelphia	4–4	1–5–2	3–2–3	—	8–11–5

Vs. Smythe Division

1978–79 NHL records
Team	CHI	COL	STL	VAN	Total
Atlanta	2–1–2	4–0	4–1	2–2	12–4–2
N.Y. Islanders	3–2	4–0–1	3–0–2	4–0	14–2–3
N.Y. Rangers	4–0	4–1	3–2	4–0	15–3–0
Philadelphia	1–3	3–0–1	4–1	2–1–1	10–5–2

Vs. Adams Division

1978–79 NHL records
Team	BOS	BUF	MIN	TOR	Total
Atlanta	1–3	2–2–1	1–2–1	4–1	8–8–2
N.Y. Islanders	2–1–2	1–2–1	3–1	3–1	9–5–3
N.Y. Rangers	2–3	2–1–1	1–2–1	2–2–1	7–8–3
Philadelphia	3–1–1	3–0–2	2–2	2–2–1	10–5–4

Vs. Norris Division

1978–79 NHL records
Team	DET	LAK	MTL	PIT	WSH	Total
Atlanta	3–0–1	2–2	1–3	3–0–1	2–1–1	11–6–3
N.Y. Islanders	3–0–1	2–0–2	3–1	1–0–3	3–1	12–2–6
N.Y. Rangers	1–1–2	3–1	3–1	2–2	1–1–2	10–6–4
Philadelphia	2–0–2	4–0	0–3–1	3–1	3–0–1	12–4–4

== Schedule and results ==
1978–79 regular season
October: 5–1–3 (home: 4–0–2; road: 1–1–1)

Game	October	Opponent	Score	Record
1	12	Philadelphia Flyers	3 – 3	0–0–1
2	15	Colorado Rockies	4 – 1	1–0–1
3	18	Detroit Red Wings	3 – 3	1–0–2
4	19	@ Detroit Red Wings	2 – 2	1–0–3
5	21	@ New York Islanders	5 – 3	1–1–3
6	22	Toronto Maple Leafs	5 – 2	2–1–3
7	25	Vancouver Canucks	6 – 2	3–1–3
8	28	@ Montreal Canadiens	2 – 1	4–1–3
9	29	Pittsburgh Penguins	3 – 2	5–1–3

November: 8–3–1 (home: 2–3–1; road: 6–0–0)

Game	November	Opponent	Score	Record
10	2	@ Colorado Rockies	3 – 0	6–1–3
11	4	@ Los Angeles Kings	7 – 3	7–1–3
12	5	@ Vancouver Canucks	5 – 2	8–1–3
13	8	Minnesota North Stars	5 – 3	8–2–3
14	11	@ Pittsburgh Penguins	2 – 1	9–2–3
15	12	New York Islanders	5 – 3	9–3–3
16	15	Chicago Black Hawks	8 – 1	10–3–3
17	18	@ Minnesota North Stars	7 – 2	11–3–3
18	19	Atlanta Flames	3 – 1	11–4–3
19	22	Toronto Maple Leafs	3 – 3	11–4–4
20	26	Washington Capitals	9 – 4	12–4–4
21	29	@ Atlanta Flames	5 – 3	13–4–4

December: 7–9–0 (home: 4–4–0; road: 3–5–0)

Game	December	Opponent	Score	Record
22	2	@ Toronto Maple Leafs	5 – 2	13–5–4
23	3	Boston Bruins	3 – 2	13–6–4
24	6	St. Louis Blues	7 – 4	14–6–4
25	7	@ Philadelphia Flyers	5 – 2	15–6–4
26	9	@ Detroit Red Wings	5 – 4	15–7–4
27	10	Philadelphia Flyers	4 – 0	15–8–4
28	13	Los Angeles Kings	8 – 7	16–8–4
29	16	@ Boston Bruins	4 – 1	16–9–4
30	17	Boston Bruins	4 – 1	16–10–4
31	20	Buffalo Sabres	6 – 3	17–10–4
32	22	Detroit Red Wings	4 – 2	18–10–4
33	23	@ New York Islanders	9 – 4	18–11–4
34	26	@ Atlanta Flames	5 – 3	19–11–4
35	28	@ Philadelphia Flyers	6 – 5	19–12–4
36	30	@ Chicago Black Hawks	5 – 4	20–12–4
37	31	Atlanta Flames	6 – 5	20–13–4

January: 9–4–1 (home: 3–1–1; road: 6–3–0)

Game	January	Opponent	Score	Record
38	3	Montreal Canadiens	6 – 2	21–13–4
39	5	Vancouver Canucks	6 – 4	22–13–4
40	9	@ St. Louis Blues	5 – 3	23–13–4
41	10	@ Colorado Rockies	5 – 3	24–13–4
42	14	@ Atlanta Flames	6 – 4	25–13–4
43	15	Minnesota North Stars	8 – 1	25–14–4
44	17	New York Islanders	5 – 3	26–14–4
45	20	@ St. Louis Blues	3 – 2	26–15–4
46	21	Philadelphia Flyers	5 – 5	26–15–5
47	24	@ Washington Capitals	5 – 1	26–16–5
48	25	@ Buffalo Sabres	5 – 4	27–16–5
49	27	@ New York Islanders	7 – 2	28–16–5
50	30	@ Vancouver Canucks	5 – 3	29–16–5
51	31	@ Colorado Rockies	5 – 4	29–17–5

February: 5–3–2 (home: 3–0–1; road: 2–3–1)

Game	February	Opponent	Score	Record
52	3	@ Los Angeles Kings	4 – 2	29–18–5
53	14	Boston Bruins	5 – 1	30–18–5
54	15	@ Buffalo Sabres	4 – 3	30–19–5
55	17	@ Philadelphia Flyers	4 – 2	31–19–5
56	18	Washington Capitals	6 – 6	31–19–6
57	21	St. Louis Blues	7 – 3	32–19–6
58	24	@ Toronto Maple Leafs	4 – 2	33–19–6
59	25	New York Islanders	3 – 2	34–19–6
60	27	@ St. Louis Blues	4 – 1	34–20–6
61	28	@ Minnesota North Stars	4 – 4	34–20–7

March: 5–6–3 (home: 2–4–2; road: 3–2–1)

Game	March	Opponent	Score	Record
62	3	Buffalo Sabres	2 – 2	34–20–8
63	4	Toronto Maple Leafs	4 – 2	34–21–8
64	7	Colorado Rockies	5 – 3	35–21–8
65	10	@ Montreal Canadiens	6 – 3	36–21–8
66	11	Chicago Black Hawks	5 – 2	37–21–8
67	14	Atlanta Flames	6 – 4	37–22–8
68	15	@ Boston Bruins	7 – 4	38–22–8
69	17	@ New York Islanders	5 – 2	38–23–8
70	18	Pittsburgh Penguins	5 – 1	38–24–8
71	20	@ Washington Capitals	2 – 2	38–24–9
72	21	@ Chicago Black Hawks	7 – 6	39–24–9
73	25	Montreal Canadiens	1 – 0	39–25–9
74	27	Philadelphia Flyers	4 – 4	39–25–10
75	28	@ Pittsburgh Penguins	7 – 1	39–26–10

April: 1–3–1 (home: 1–1–1; road: 0–2–0)

Game	April	Opponent	Score	Record
76	1	@ Philadelphia Flyers	7 – 3	39–27–10
77	2	Los Angeles Kings	5 – 4	40–27–10
78	4	Atlanta Flames	3 – 3	40–27–11
79	6	@ Atlanta Flames	9 – 2	40–28–11
80	8	New York Islanders	5 – 2	40–29–11

Legend: Win (2 points) Loss (0 points) Tie (1 point)

=== Season summary ===
- February 25: During a win against the Islanders, Ulf Nilsson was injured on a hip check by Denis Potvin of the New York Islanders. He suffered a broken ankle when his skate blade got caught in a crevice in the Madison Square Garden ice as he was hit by Potvin, which resulted in Nilsson bearing the entire force of the hit on only one leg. Although Nilsson has never characterized the hit as dirty and, in 2009, said, "He [Potvin] was always fair. But the ice was never great in the Garden, because they had basketball and other events. My foot got caught. It was a freak thing." Nevertheless, the incident is still commemorated by the "Potvin Sucks" chant that takes place during every Rangers home game, and to this day, this would serve as the origin to this infamous "Potvin Sucks" chant at Madison Square Garden.

== Playoffs ==
=== Stanley Cup Final ===
The Rangers faced the defending champion Montreal Canadiens, who were making their fourth straight Stanley Cup Final appearance. It was the Rangers' first appearance in the Final since the 1972 Stanley Cup Final. The Canadiens would win the best-of-seven series four games to one, to win their fourth consecutive Stanley Cup.

1979 Stanley Cup playoffs
Preliminary round vs. (10) Los Angeles Kings – Rangers win 2–0

Game	Date	Visitor	Score	Home	OT	Series
1	April 10	Los Angeles Kings	1 – 7	New York Rangers		New York Rangers lead series 1–0
2	April 12	New York Rangers	2 – 1	Los Angeles Kings	OT	New York Rangers win series 2–0

Quarterfinals vs. (4) Philadelphia Flyers – Rangers win 4–1

Game	Date	Visitor	Score	Home	OT	Series
1	April 16	New York Rangers	2 – 3	Philadelphia Flyers	OT	Philadelphia leads series 1–0
2	April 18	New York Rangers	7 – 1	Philadelphia Flyers		Series tied 1-1
3	April 20	Philadelphia Flyers	1 – 5	New York Rangers		New York Rangers lead series 2–1
4	April 22	Philadelphia Flyers	0 – 6	New York Rangers		New York Rangers lead series 3–1
5	April 24	New York Rangers	8 – 3	Philadelphia Flyers		New York Rangers win series 4–1

Semifinals vs. (1) New York Islanders – Rangers win 4–2

Game	Date	Visitor	Score	Home	OT	Series
1	April 26	New York Rangers	4 – 1	New York Islanders		New York Rangers lead series 1–0
2	April 28	New York Rangers	3 – 4	New York Islanders	OT	Series tied 1-1
3	May 1	New York Islanders	1 – 3	New York Rangers		New York Rangers lead series 2–1
4	May 3	New York Islanders	3 – 2	New York Rangers	OT	Series tied 2-2
5	May 5	New York Rangers	4 – 3	New York Islanders		New York Rangers lead series 3–2
6	May 8	New York Islanders	1 – 2	New York Rangers		New York Rangers win series 4–2

Stnaley Cup Final vs. (2) Montreal Canadiens – Canadiens win 4–1

Game	Date	Visitor	Score	Home	OT	Series
1	May 13	New York Rangers	4 – 1	Montreal Canadiens		New York Rangers lead series 1–0
2	May 15	New York Rangers	2 – 6	Montreal Canadiens		Series tied 1-1
3	May 17	Montreal Canadiens	4 – 1	New York Rangers		Montreal leads series 2–1
4	May 19	Montreal Canadiens	4 – 3	New York Rangers	OT	Montreal leads series 3–1
5	May 21	New York Rangers	1 – 4	Montreal Canadiens		Montreal wins series 4–1

Legend: Win Loss

== Player statistics ==
Skaters

Regular season
Player	GP	G	A	Pts	PIM
Anders Hedberg	80	33	46	79	33
Phil Esposito	80	42	36	78	37
Pat Hickey	80	34	41	75	56
Ulf Nilsson	59	27	39	66	21
Ron Duguay	79	27	36	63	35
Mike McEwen	80	20	38	58	35
Ron Greschner	60	17	36	53	66
Steve Vickers	66	13	34	47	24
Carol Vadnais	77	8	37	45	86
Walt Tkaczuk	77	15	27	42	38
Don Murdoch	40	15	21	36	6
Pierre Plante	70	6	25	31	37
Mario Marois	71	5	26	31	153
Dean Talafous	68	13	16	29	29
Lucien DeBlois	62	11	17	28	26
Dave Maloney	76	11	17	28	151
Don Maloney	28	9	17	26	39
Dave Farrish	71	1	19	20	61
Ed Johnstone	30	5	3	8	27
Nick Fotiu	71	3	5	8	190
Greg Polis^{‡}	6	1	1	2	8
Dan Clark	4	0	1	1	6
Mike Korney	18	0	1	1	18
Tim Bothwell	1	0	0	0	2
Mike McDougall	1	0	0	0	0
Dean Turner	1	0	0	0	0
Frank Beaton	2	0	0	0	0
Andre Dore	2	0	0	0	0

Playoffs
Player	GP	G	A	Pts	PIM
Don Maloney	18	7	13	20	19
Phil Esposito	18	8	12	20	20
Mike McEwen	18	2	11	13	8
Don Murdoch	18	7	5	12	12
Ron Greschner	18	7	5	12	16
Walt Tkaczuk	18	4	7	11	10
Carol Vadnais	18	2	9	11	13
Ron Duguay	18	5	4	9	11
Anders Hedberg	18	4	5	9	12
Steve Vickers	18	5	3	8	13
Pat Hickey	18	1	7	8	6
Bobby Sheehan	15	4	3	7	8
Dave Maloney	17	3	4	7	45
Mario Marois	18	0	6	6	29
Pierre Plante	18	0	6	6	20
Ed Johnstone	17	5	0	5	10
Dave Farrish	7	0	2	2	14
Lucien DeBlois	9	2	0	2	4
Nick Fotiu	4	0	0	0	6
Ulf Nilsson	2	0	0	0	2

Goaltenders

Regular season
Player	GP	TOI	W	L	T	GA	GAA	SO
John Davidson	39	2232	20	12	5	131	3.52	0
Wayne Thomas	31	1668	15	10	3	101	3.63	1
Doug Soetaert	17	900	5	7	3	57	3.80	0

Playoffs
Player	GP	TOI	W	L	GA	GAA	SO
John Davidson	18	1106	11	7	42	2.28	1

^{†}Denotes player spent time with another team before joining Rangers. Stats reflect time with Rangers only.
^{‡}Traded mid-season. Stats reflect time with Rangers only.

Note:

Pos = Position;GP = Games played; G = Goals; A = Assists; Pts = Points; PIM = Penalty minutes; +/- = Plus/minus; PPG = Power-play goals; SHG = Short-handed goals; GWG = Game-winning goals
Pos = Position;GP = Games played; Min, TOI = Minutes played; W = Wins; L = Losses; T,T/OT = Ties; OTL = Overtime losses; GA = Goals-against; GAA = Goals-against average; SO = Shutouts; SA = Shots against; SV = Shots saved;SV% = Save percentage;

== Draft picks ==
New York's picks at the 1978 NHL amateur draft in Montreal, Canada.

Round	#	Player	Position	Nationality	College/Junior/Club team (League)
2	26	Don Maloney	LW	Canada	Kitchener Rangers (OHA)
3	43	Ray Markham	C	Canada	Flin Flon Bombers (WCHL)
3	44	Dean Turner	D	United States	University of Michigan (NCAA)
4	59	Dave Silk	RW	United States	Boston University (NCAA)
4	60	Andre Dore	D	Canada	Quebec Remparts (QMJHL)
5	76	Mike MacDougall	RW	United States	Port Huron Flags (IHL)
6	93	Tom Laidlaw	D	Canada	Northern Michigan University (NCAA)
7	110	Dan Clark	D	Canada	Milwaukee Admirals (IHL)
8	127	Greg Kostenko	D	Canada	Ohio State University (NCAA)
9	144	Brian McDavid	D	Canada	Kitchener Rangers (OHA)
10	161	Mark Rodrigues	G	United States	Yale University (NCAA)
11	176	Steve Weeks	G	Canada	Northern Michigan University (NCAA)
12	192	Pierre Daigneault	LW	Canada	Montreal Juniors (QMJHL)
13	206	Chris McLaughlin	D	United States	Dartmouth College (NCAA)
14	217	Todd Johnson	C	United States	Boston University (NCAA)
15	223	Dan McCarthy	C	Canada	Sudbury Wolves (OHA)
