= 1978–79 Colorado Rockies season =

NHL hockey team season

1978–79 Colorado Rockies
- Division: 4th Smythe
- Conference: 8th Campbell
- 1978–79 record: 15–53–12
- Home record: 8–24–8
- Road record: 7–29–4
- Goals for: 210
- Goals against: 331

Team information
- General manager: Ray Miron
- Coach: Pat Kelly
- Captain: Wilf Paiement
- Alternate captains: None
- Arena: McNichols Sports Arena

Team leaders
- Goals: Wilf Paiement (24)
- Assists: Wilf Paiement (36)
- Points: Wilf Paiement (60)
- Penalty minutes: Barry Beck (91)
- Wins: Michel Plasse (9)
- Goals against average: Bill Oleschuk (3.86)

The 1978–79 Colorado Rockies season was the Rockies' third season and the fifth season of the franchise. Like three of the previous four seasons, the Rockies did not qualify for the playoffs.

== Regular season ==
=== Final standings ===
Smythe Division
	GP	W	L	T	GF	GA	Pts
Chicago Black Hawks	80	29	36	15	244	277	73
Vancouver Canucks	80	25	42	13	217	291	63
St. Louis Blues	80	18	50	12	249	348	48
Colorado Rockies	80	15	53	12	210	331	42

=== Record vs. opponents ===
Smythe Division record vs. opponents

Vs. Campbell Conference

Vs. Wales Conference

Vs. Smythe Division

1978–79 NHL records
Team	CHI	COL	STL	VAN	Total
Chicago	—	5–2–1	5–2–1	1–3–4	11–7–6
Colorado	2–5–1	—	4–2–2	1–6–1	7–13–4
St. Louis	2–5–1	2–4–2	—	1–4–3	5–13–6
Vancouver	3–1–4	6–1–1	4–1–3	—	13–3–8

Vs. Patrick Division

1978–79 NHL records
Team	ATL	NYI	NYR	PHI	Total
Chicago	1–2–2	2–3	0–4	3–1	6–10–2
Colorado	0–4	0–4–1	1–4	0–3–1	1–15–2
St. Louis	1–4	0–3–2	2–3	1–4	4–14–2
Vancouver	2–2	0–4	0–4	1–2–1	3–12–1

Vs. Adams Division

1978–79 NHL records
Team	BOS	BUF	MIN	TOR	Total
Chicago	1–3–1	2–2–1	2–2	2–1–1	7–8–3
Colorado	1–3	0–3–1	3–2–1	1–2–1	5–10–3
St. Louis	1–3	0–3–1	1–2–1	0–4	2–12–2
Vancouver	0–4	1–3–1	1–4–1	1–3–1	3–14–3

Vs. Norris Division

1978–79 NHL records
Team	DET	LAK	MTL	PIT	WSH	Total
Chicago	0–3–1	1–3	2–2	0–2–2	2–1–1	5–11–4
Colorado	0–3–1	0–2–2	0–4	1–3	1–3	2–15–3
St. Louis	3–1	1–2–1	0–4	1–2–1	2–2	7–12–1
Vancouver	3–1	1–3	0–3–1	1–3	1–3	6–12–2

== Schedule and results ==
1978–79 regular season
October

Game	Result	Date	Score	Opponent	Record
1	L	October 11, 1978	2–8	@ Vancouver Canucks (1978–79)	0–1–0
2	L	October 14, 1978	2–5	@ Montreal Canadiens (1978–79)	0–2–0
3	L	October 15, 1978	1–4	@ New York Rangers (1978–79)	0–3–0
4	L	October 17, 1978	2–8	@ Atlanta Flames (1978–79)	0–4–0
5	T	October 20, 1978	5–5	St. Louis Blues (1978–79)	0–4–1
6	W	October 21, 1978	4–3	@ St. Louis Blues (1978–79)	1–4–1
7	L	October 25, 1978	4–5	@ Detroit Red Wings (1978–79)	1–5–1
8	L	October 27, 1978	2–5	Detroit Red Wings (1978–79)	1–6–1
9	W	October 28, 1978	1–0	@ Minnesota North Stars (1978–79)	2–6–1
10	L	October 31, 1978	5–8	@ New York Islanders (1978–79)	2–7–1

November

Game	Result	Date	Score	Opponent	Record
11	L	November 2, 1978	0–3	New York Rangers (1978–79)	2–8–1
12	T	November 4, 1978	4–4	Toronto Maple Leafs (1978–79)	2–8–2
13	L	November 5, 1978	4–6	@ Philadelphia Flyers (1978–79)	2–9–2
14	L	November 8, 1978	3–6	@ Pittsburgh Penguins (1978–79)	2–10–2
15	T	November 10, 1978	2–2	Philadelphia Flyers (1978–79)	2–10–3
16	L	November 11, 1978	3–5	@ St. Louis Blues (1978–79)	2–11–3
17	T	November 14, 1978	2–2	@ New York Islanders (1978–79)	2–11–4
18	L	November 15, 1978	1–6	Montreal Canadiens (1978–79)	2–12–4
19	W	November 18, 1978	8–3	Chicago Black Hawks (1978–79)	3–12–4
20	L	November 21, 1978	1–7	New York Islanders (1978–79)	3–13–4
21	L	November 23, 1978	2–7	Vancouver Canucks (1978–79)	3–14–4
22	W	November 25, 1978	6–3	@ Toronto Maple Leafs (1978–79)	4–14–4
23	L	November 26, 1978	1–4	@ Buffalo Sabres (1978–79)	4–15–4
24	T	November 29, 1978	2–2	Detroit Red Wings (1978–79)	4–15–5

November

Game	Result	Date	Score	Opponent	Record
25	L	December 2, 1978	2–5	New York Islanders (1978–79)	4–16–5
26	L	December 3, 1978	3–4	@ Chicago Black Hawks (1978–79)	4–17–5
27	L	December 5, 1978	1–4	Washington Capitals (1978–79)	4–18–5
28	L	December 8, 1978	3–4	Atlanta Flames (1978–79)	4–19–5
29	L	December 9, 1978	0–3	@ Minnesota North Stars (1978–79)	4–20–5
30	W	December 12, 1978	4–3	@ Washington Capitals (1978–79)	5–20–5
31	L	December 14, 1978	3–5	@ Atlanta Flames (1978–79)	5–21–5
32	W	December 16, 1978	5–1	Chicago Black Hawks (1978–79)	6–21–5
33	T	December 19, 1978	2–2	Los Angeles Kings (1978–79)	6–21–6
34	L	December 21, 1978	2–4	@ Boston Bruins (1978–79)	6–22–6
35	L	December 23, 1978	2–3	@ Montreal Canadiens (1978–79)	6–23–6
36	L	December 27, 1978	2–5	Buffalo Sabres (1978–79)	6–24–6
37	W	December 30, 1978	7–2	Minnesota North Stars (1978–79)	7–24–6

January

Game	Result	Date	Score	Opponent	Record
38	L	January 1, 1979	3–5	@ Los Angeles Kings (1978–79)	7–25–6
39	W	January 2, 1979	4–2	St. Louis Blues (1978–79)	8–25–6
40	L	January 5, 1979	3–5	Boston Bruins (1978–79)	8–26–6
41	W	January 6, 1979	4–1	@ St. Louis Blues (1978–79)	9–26–6
42	L	January 10, 1979	3–5	New York Rangers (1978–79)	9–27–6
43	L	January 12, 1979	1–8	@ Washington Capitals (1978–79)	9–28–6
44	L	January 13, 1979	2–4	@ Toronto Maple Leafs (1978–79)	9–29–6
45	L	January 16, 1979	2–3	Toronto Maple Leafs (1978–79)	9–30–6
46	L	January 17, 1979	1–2	@ Chicago Black Hawks (1978–79)	9–31–6
47	W	January 19, 1979	5–3	Minnesota North Stars (1978–79)	10–31–6
48	T	January 20, 1979	3–3	@ Minnesota North Stars (1978–79)	10–31–7
49	W	January 25, 1979	5–3	Pittsburgh Penguins (1978–79)	11–31–7
50	T	January 27, 1979	2–2	Vancouver Canucks (1978–79)	11–31–8
51	W	January 31, 1979	5–4	New York Rangers (1978–79)	12–31–8

February

Game	Result	Date	Score	Opponent	Record
52	L	February 3, 1979	3–6	@ St. Louis Blues (1978–79)	12–32–8
53	L	February 4, 1979	1–4	Los Angeles Kings (1978–79)	12–33–8
54	L	February 13, 1979	1–6	@ New York Islanders (1978–79)	12–34–8
55	L	February 15, 1979	3–9	Washington Capitals (1978–79)	12–35–8
56	L	February 17, 1979	1–5	Atlanta Flames (1978–79)	12–36–8
57	L	February 18, 1979	3–5	@ Chicago Black Hawks (1978–79)	12–37–8
58	L	February 20, 1979	3–5	Boston Bruins (1978–79)	12–38–8
59	L	February 22, 1979	0–3	@ Vancouver Canucks (1978–79)	12–39–8
60	L	February 23, 1979	3–5	Philadelphia Flyers (1978–79)	12–40–8
61	L	February 25, 1979	1–8	@ Detroit Red Wings (1978–79)	12–41–8
62	W	February 27, 1979	4–2	@ Boston Bruins (1978–79)	13–41–8
63	L	February 28, 1979	3–5	@ Pittsburgh Penguins (1978–79)	13–42–8

March

Game	Result	Date	Score	Opponent	Record
64	L	March 2, 1979	0–4	Chicago Black Hawks (1978–79)	13–43–8
65	L	March 4, 1979	2–7	Pittsburgh Penguins (1978–79)	13–44–8
66	L	March 6, 1979	0–5	@ Philadelphia Flyers (1978–79)	13–45–8
67	L	March 7, 1979	3–5	@ New York Rangers (1978–79)	13–46–8
68	W	March 10, 1979	3–1	@ Vancouver Canucks (1978–79)	14–46–8
69	T	March 13, 1979	5–5	St. Louis Blues (1978–79)	14–46–9
70	L	March 16, 1979	1–4	Vancouver Canucks (1978–79)	14–47–9
71	L	March 18, 1979	1–3	Montreal Canadiens (1978–79)	14–48–9
72	L	March 21, 1979	2–3	Buffalo Sabres (1978–79)	14–49–9
73	L	March 24, 1979	1–3	Minnesota North Stars (1978–79)	14–50–9
74	L	March 25, 1979	0–3	@ Chicago Black Hawks (1978–79)	14–51–9
75	T	March 27, 1979	1–1	Chicago Black Hawks (1978–79)	14–51–10
76	L	March 31, 1979	0–2	Vancouver Canucks (1978–79)	14–52–10

April

Game	Result	Date	Score	Opponent	Record
77	W	April 1, 1979	9–5	St. Louis Blues (1978–79)	15–52–10
78	L	April 3, 1979	1–2	@ Vancouver Canucks (1978–79)	15–53–10
79	T	April 5, 1979	4–4	@ Los Angeles Kings (1978–79)	15–53–11
80	T	April 8, 1979	5–5	@ Buffalo Sabres (1978–79)	15–53–12

Legend: Win (2 points) Loss (0 points) Tie (1 point)

== Player statistics ==
=== Regular season ===
Scoring

Player	Pos	GP	G	A	Pts	PIM	+/-	PPG	SHG	GWG
Wilf Paiement	RW	65	24	36	60	80	-30	5	0	1
Jack Valiquette	C	76	23	34	57	12	-42	8	2	3
Paul Gardner	C	64	23	26	49	32	-25	14	0	0
John Van Boxmeer	D	76	9	34	43	46	-26	4	0	0
Barry Beck	D	63	14	28	42	91	-30	5	0	0
Gary Croteau	LW	79	23	18	41	18	-28	8	0	1
Randy Pierce	RW	70	19	17	36	35	-21	4	1	3
Ron Delorme	C	77	20	8	28	68	-30	2	0	3
Merlin Malinowski	C	54	6	17	23	10	-17	0	0	1
Ralph Klassen	C	64	6	13	19	12	-25	1	1	2
Rey Comeau	C	70	8	10	18	16	-20	1	2	0
Andy Spruce	LW	47	3	15	18	31	-18	0	0	0
Joe Contini	C	30	5	12	17	6	-19	2	0	1
Dennis Owchar	D	50	3	13	16	27	-33	1	0	0
Mike Christie	D	68	1	10	11	88	-44	0	0	0
Mike Gillis	LW	30	1	7	8	6	-18	0	0	0
Bill Lochead	LW	27	4	2	6	14	-15	1	1	0
Nick Beverley	D	52	2	4	6	6	-16	0	1	0
Larry Skinner	C	12	3	2	5	2	-5	1	0	0
Don Ashby	C	12	2	3	5	0	-3	2	0	0
Mike Dwyer	LW	12	2	3	5	2	-4	0	0	0
Clayton Pachal	C/LW	24	2	3	5	69	-11	1	0	0
Don Awrey	D	56	1	4	5	18	-33	0	0	0
Mike Kitchen	D	53	1	4	5	28	-19	0	0	0
Nelson Pyatt	C	28	2	2	4	2	-17	0	0	0
Trevor Johansen	D	11	1	3	4	16	-8	0	0	0
Michel Lachance	D	21	0	4	4	22	-9	0	0	0
Don Saleski	RW	16	2	0	2	4	-10	0	0	0
Michel Plasse	G	41	0	2	2	4	0	0	0	0
Joe Watson	D	16	0	2	2	12	-13	0	0	0
Doug Favell	G	7	0	1	1	17	0	0	0	0
Ron Andruff	C	3	0	0	0	0	-4	0	0	0
Kevin Krook	D	3	0	0	0	2	0	0	0	0
Paul Messier	C	9	0	0	0	4	-6	0	0	0
Bill Oleschuk	G	40	0	0	0	10	0	0	0	0

Goaltending

Player	MIN	GP	W	L	T	GA	GAA	SO
Michel Plasse	2302	41	9	29	2	152	3.96	0
Bill Oleschuk	2118	40	6	19	8	136	3.85	1
Doug Favell	380	7	0	5	2	34	5.37	0
Team:	4800	80	15	53	12	322	4.02	1

Note: GP = Games played; G = Goals; A = Assists; Pts = Points; +/- = Plus/minus; PIM = Penalty minutes; PPG=Power-play goals; SHG=Short-handed goals; GWG=Game-winning goals
MIN=Minutes played; W = Wins; L = Losses; T = Ties; GA = Goals against; GAA = Goals against average; SO = Shutouts;

== Draft picks ==
Colorado's draft picks at the 1978 NHL amateur draft held at the Queen Elizabeth Hotel in Montreal.

Round	#	Player	Nationality	College/Junior/Club team (League)
1	5	Mike Gillis	Canada	Kingston Canadians (OMJHL)
2	27	Merlin Malinowski	Canada	Medicine Hat Tigers (WCHL)
3	41	Paul Messier	Canada	University of Denver (WCHA)
4	58	Dave Watson	Canada	Sault Ste. Marie Greyhounds (OMJHL)
5	73	Tim Thomlison	Canada	Billings Bighorns (WCHL)
5	74	Rod Guimont	Canada	Lethbridge Broncos (WCHL)
6	91	John Hynes	United States	Harvard University (ECAC)
7	108	Andy Clark	Canada	Lake Superior State University (CCHA)
8	125	John Olver	Canada	University of Michigan (WCHA)
9	142	Kevin Krook	Canada	Regina Pats (WCHL)
10	159	Jeff Jensen	United States	Lake Superior State University (CCHA)
11	174	Bo Ericson	Sweden	AIK (Sweden)
12	190	Jari Viitala	Finland	Ilves (Finland)
13	204	Ulf Zetterstrom	Sweden	Kiruna (Sweden)

== See also ==
- 1978–79 NHL season
