= 1978–79 Toronto Maple Leafs season =

NHL hockey team season

1978–79 Toronto Maple Leafs
- Division: 3rd Adams
- Conference: 5th Wales
- 1978–79 record: 34–33–13
- Home record: 20–12–8
- Road record: 14–21–5
- Goals for: 267
- Goals against: 252

Team information
- General manager: Jim Gregory
- Coach: Roger Neilson
- Captain: Darryl Sittler
- Alternate captains: None
- Arena: Maple Leaf Gardens

Team leaders
- Goals: Lanny McDonald (43)
- Assists: Darryl Sittler (51)
- Points: Darryl Sittler (87)
- Penalty minutes: Tiger Williams (298)
- Wins: Mike Palmateer (26)
- Goals against average: Mike Palmateer (2.95)

The 1978–79 Toronto Maple Leafs season was the 62nd season of the Toronto NHL franchise, 52nd as the Maple Leafs. The Leafs placed third in the Adams Division to make the playoffs for the sixth consecutive year, where they won their first round series against the Atlanta Flames, only to lose in their second round series to the eventual Stanley Cup champion Montreal Canadiens. The Maple Leafs and Canadiens would not play each other in the postseason again until the 2021 season.

== Offseason ==
=== NHL draft ===
Round	#	Player	Nationality	College/Junior/Club team
2	21	Joel Quenneville	Canada	Windsor Spitfires (OMJHL)
3	48	Mark Kirton	Canada	Peterborough Petes (OMJHL)
4	65	Bob Parent	Canada	Kitchener Rangers (OMJHL)
5	81	Jordy Douglas	Canada	Flin Flon Bombers (WCHL)
6	92	Mel Hewitt	Canada	Calgary Wranglers (WCHL)
6	98	Norm Lefebvre	Canada	Trois-Rivières Draveurs (QMJHL)
7	115	John Scammell	Canada	Lethbridge Broncos (WCHL)
8	132	Kevin Reinhart	Canada	Kitchener Rangers (OMJHL)
9	149	Mike Waghorne	United States	University of New Hampshire (ECAC)
10	166	Laurie Cuvelier	Canada	St. Francis Xavier University (CIAU)

== Regular season ==
=== Final standings ===
Adams Division
	GP	W	L	T	GF	GA	Pts
**Boston Bruins**	80	43	23	14	316	270	100
**Buffalo Sabres**	80	36	28	16	280	263	88
**Toronto Maple Leafs**	80	34	33	13	267	252	81
Minnesota North Stars	80	28	40	12	257	289	68

Note: W = Wins, L = Losses, T = Ties, GF = Goals For, GA = Goals Against, Pts = Points
Teams that qualified for the playoffs are highlighted in bold.

=== Record vs. opponents ===
Adams Division record vs. opponents

**Vs. Wales Conference**

**Vs. Campbell Conference**

**Vs. Adams Division**

1978–79 NHL records
Team	**BOS**	**BUF**	**MIN**	**TOR**	**Total**
Boston	—	4−3−1	5−0−3	5−1−2	**14−4−6**
Buffalo	3−4−1	—	5−2−1	4−3−1	**12−9−3**
Minnesota	0−5−3	2−5−1	—	2−4−2	**4−14−6**
Toronto	1−5−2	3−4−1	4−2−2	—	**8−11−5**

**Vs. Norris Division**

1978–79 NHL records
Team	**DET**	**LAK**	**MTL**	**PIT**	**WSH**	**Total**
Boston	3−1	1−3	0−2−2	1−2−1	3−0−1	**8−8−4**
Buffalo	3−1	2−1−1	0−4	0−2−2	3−0−1	**8−8−4**
Minnesota	2−1−1	1−3	1−3	1−3	2−2	**7−12−1**
Toronto	2−2	4−0	0−3−1	3−1	1−1−2	**10−7−3**

**Vs. Patrick Division**

1978–79 NHL records
Team	**ATL**	**NYI**	**NYR**	**PHI**	**Total**
Boston	3−1	1−2−2	3−2	1−3−1	**8−8−3**
Buffalo	2−2−1	2−1−1	1−2−1	0−3−2	**5−8−5**
Minnesota	2−1−1	1−3	2−1−1	2−2	**7−7−2**
Toronto	1−4	1−3	2−2−1	2−2−1	**6−11−2**

**Vs. Smythe Division**

1978–79 NHL records
Team	**CHI**	**COL**	**STL**	**VAN**	**Total**
Boston	3−1−1	3−1	3−1	4−0	**13−3−1**
Buffalo	2−2−1	3−0−1	3−0−1	3−1−1	**11−3−4**
Minnesota	2−2	2−3−1	2−1−1	4−1−1	**10−7−3**
Toronto	1−2−1	2−1−1	4−0	3−1−1	**10−4−3**

== Schedule and results ==
1978–79 regular season
October

Game	Result	Date	Score	Opponent	Record
1	W	October 11, 1978	3–2	@ Pittsburgh Penguins (1978–79)	1–0–0
2	W	October 14, 1978	10–7	New York Islanders (1978–79)	2–0–0
3	L	October 15, 1978	2–4	@ Boston Bruins (1978–79)	2–1–0
4	W	October 18, 1978	2–0	Buffalo Sabres (1978–79)	3–1–0
5	L	October 19, 1978	0–1	@ Buffalo Sabres (1978–79)	3–2–0
6	W	October 21, 1978	2–0	Philadelphia Flyers (1978–79)	4–2–0
7	L	October 22, 1978	2–5	@ New York Rangers (1978–79)	4–3–0
8	T	October 25, 1978	4–4	Montreal Canadiens (1978–79)	4–3–1
9	L	October 26, 1978	0–5	@ Philadelphia Flyers (1978–79)	4–4–1
10	L	October 28, 1978	3–5	Boston Bruins (1978–79)	4–5–1

November

Game	Result	Date	Score	Opponent	Record
11	W	November 1, 1978	4–2	@ Los Angeles Kings (1978–79)	5–5–1
12	W	November 3, 1978	3–1	@ Vancouver Canucks (1978–79)	6–5–1
13	T	November 4, 1978	4–4	@ Colorado Rockies (1978–79)	6–5–2
14	W	November 7, 1978	5–0	@ St. Louis Blues (1978–79)	7–5–2
15	L	November 8, 1978	1–2	@ Chicago Black Hawks (1978–79)	7–6–2
16	L	November 11, 1978	2–3	@ Montreal Canadiens (1978–79)	7–7–2
17	T	November 15, 1978	2–2	Buffalo Sabres (1978–79)	7–7–3
18	W	November 16, 1978	6–4	@ Boston Bruins (1978–79)	8–7–3
19	W	November 18, 1978	3–1	St. Louis Blues (1978–79)	9–7–3
20	W	November 21, 1978	4–3	@ Atlanta Flames (1978–79)	10–7–3
21	T	November 22, 1978	3–3	@ New York Rangers (1978–79)	10–7–4
22	L	November 25, 1978	3–6	Colorado Rockies (1978–79)	10–8–4
23	W	November 26, 1978	8–2	Pittsburgh Penguins (1978–79)	11–8–4
24	W	November 29, 1978	5–3	@ Minnesota North Stars (1978–79)	12–8–4

December

Game	Result	Date	Score	Opponent	Record
25	W	December 2, 1978	5–2	New York Rangers (1978–79)	13–8–4
26	L	December 3, 1978	2–7	@ Philadelphia Flyers (1978–79)	13–9–4
27	L	December 5, 1978	1–5	Boston Bruins (1978–79)	13–10–4
28	L	December 6, 1978	4–6	@ Pittsburgh Penguins (1978–79)	13–11–4
29	L	December 9, 1978	2–3	New York Islanders (1978–79)	13–12–4
30	L	December 10, 1978	3–5	@ Buffalo Sabres (1978–79)	13–13–4
31	W	December 13, 1978	5–1	Vancouver Canucks (1978–79)	14–13–4
32	W	December 16, 1978	4–2	Detroit Red Wings (1978–79)	15–13–4
33	L	December 17, 1978	6–7	@ Washington Capitals (1978–79)	15–14–4
34	W	December 20, 1978	4–2	Minnesota North Stars (1978–79)	16–14–4
35	L	December 22, 1978	1–3	@ Atlanta Flames (1978–79)	16–15–4
36	W	December 23, 1978	6–1	@ St. Louis Blues (1978–79)	17–15–4
37	L	December 26, 1978	1–5	@ New York Islanders (1978–79)	17–16–4
38	T	December 27, 1978	1–1	Boston Bruins (1978–79)	17–16–5
39	T	December 30, 1978	5–5	Washington Capitals (1978–79)	17–16–6

January

Game	Result	Date	Score	Opponent	Record
40	L	January 3, 1979	1–4	Atlanta Flames (1978–79)	17–17–6
41	L	January 6, 1979	3–5	Chicago Black Hawks (1978–79)	17–18–6
42	L	January 8, 1979	1–5	Vancouver Canucks (1978–79)	17–19–6
43	T	January 10, 1979	2–2	Minnesota North Stars (1978–79)	17–19–7
44	W	January 13, 1979	4–2	Colorado Rockies (1978–79)	18–19–7
45	W	January 16, 1979	3–2	@ Colorado Rockies (1978–79)	19–19–7
46	T	January 19, 1979	3–3	@ Vancouver Canucks (1978–79)	19–19–8
47	W	January 20, 1979	3–2	@ Los Angeles Kings (1978–79)	20–19–8
48	T	January 24, 1979	2–2	@ Minnesota North Stars (1978–79)	20–19–9
49	L	January 26, 1979	2–4	@ Atlanta Flames (1978–79)	20–20–9
50	T	January 28, 1979	2–2	@ Washington Capitals (1978–79)	20–20–10
51	W	January 31, 1979	5–1	St. Louis Blues (1978–79)	21–20–10

February

Game	Result	Date	Score	Opponent	Record
52	L	February 3, 1979	3–6	Montreal Canadiens (1978–79)	21–21–10
53	L	February 4, 1979	4–6	@ Minnesota North Stars (1978–79)	21–22–10
54	W	February 12, 1979	5–2	@ Chicago Black Hawks (1978–79)	22–22–10
55	T	February 14, 1979	2–2	Philadelphia Flyers (1978–79)	22–22–11
56	W	February 17, 1979	5–2	Los Angeles Kings (1978–79)	23–22–11
57	W	February 19, 1979	6–2	@ Detroit Red Wings (1978–79)	24–22–11
58	L	February 21, 1979	1–5	@ Minnesota North Stars (1978–79)	24–23–11
59	L	February 24, 1979	2–4	New York Rangers (1978–79)	24–24–11
60	L	February 26, 1979	1–3	@ Buffalo Sabres (1978–79)	24–25–11
61	L	February 28, 1979	4–6	Atlanta Flames (1978–79)	24–26–11

March

Game	Result	Date	Score	Opponent	Record
62	L	March 1, 1979	1–2	@ Montreal Canadiens (1978–79)	24–27–11
63	W	March 3, 1979	4–3	Philadelphia Flyers (1978–79)	25–27–11
64	W	March 4, 1979	4–2	@ New York Rangers (1978–79)	26–27–11
65	W	March 7, 1979	2–0	Vancouver Canucks (1978–79)	27–27–11
66	W	March 10, 1979	9–4	Los Angeles Kings (1978–79)	28–27–11
67	W	March 11, 1979	4–0	Pittsburgh Penguins (1978–79)	29–27–11
68	L	March 14, 1979	1–4	Buffalo Sabres (1978–79)	29–28–11
69	L	March 15, 1979	2–6	@ New York Islanders (1978–79)	29–29–11
70	W	March 17, 1979	6–4	Minnesota North Stars (1978–79)	30–29–11
71	L	March 19, 1979	3–4	@ Boston Bruins (1978–79)	30–30–11
72	L	March 21, 1979	2–4	Detroit Red Wings (1978–79)	30–31–11
73	T	March 24, 1979	3–3	Chicago Black Hawks (1978–79)	30–31–12
74	L	March 25, 1979	1–2	@ Detroit Red Wings (1978–79)	30–32–12
75	W	March 28, 1979	6–2	Washington Capitals (1978–79)	31–32–12
76	W	March 31, 1979	6–2	Minnesota North Stars (1978–79)	32–32–12

April

Game	Result	Date	Score	Opponent	Record
77	W	April 1, 1979	6–3	@ Buffalo Sabres (1978–79)	33–32–12
78	T	April 4, 1979	3–3	Boston Bruins (1978–79)	33–32–13
79	W	April 7, 1979	6–2	Buffalo Sabres (1978–79)	34–32–13
80	L	April 8, 1979	3–6	@ Boston Bruins (1978–79)	34–33–13

Legend: Win (2 points) Loss (0 points) Tie (1 point)

== Player statistics ==
=== Regular season ===
Scoring

Player	Pos	GP	G	A	Pts	PIM	+/-	PPG	SHG	GWG
Darryl Sittler	C	70	36	51	87	69	9	12	0	4
Lanny McDonald	RW	79	43	42	85	32	12	16	0	2
Borje Salming	D	78	17	56	73	76	36	4	0	2
Ian Turnbull	D	80	12	51	63	80	-7	4	0	0
Walt McKechnie	C	79	25	36	61	18	21	7	1	6
Dan Maloney	LW	77	17	36	53	157	19	0	0	5
Tiger Williams	LW	77	19	20	39	298	-7	6	0	4
Pat Boutette	C/RW	80	14	19	33	136	3	0	0	2
Ron Ellis	RW	63	16	12	28	10	7	4	0	1
John Anderson	RW	71	15	11	26	10	2	0	0	2
Dave Hutchison	D	79	4	15	19	235	36	0	0	0
Jimmy Jones	RW	69	9	9	18	45	2	0	0	0
Ron Wilson	D	46	5	12	17	4	-10	4	0	0
Jerry Butler	RW	76	8	7	15	52	-2	0	2	2
Dave Burrows	D	65	2	11	13	28	-10	0	0	0
Garry Monahan	LW	62	4	7	11	25	4	0	2	0
Joel Quenneville	D	61	2	9	11	60	7	0	0	1
Paul Gardner	C	11	7	2	9	0	0	2	0	1
Rocky Saganiuk	RW/C	16	3	5	8	9	1	1	0	1
Bruce Boudreau	C	26	4	3	7	2	-3	0	0	0
Lorne Stamler	LW	45	4	3	7	2	-6	0	0	1
Trevor Johansen	D	40	1	4	5	48	1	0	0	0
Mike Palmateer	G	58	0	5	5	24	0	0	0	0
Don Ashby	C	3	0	0	0	0	-3	0	0	0
Pierre Hamel	G	1	0	0	0	0	0	0	0	0
Paul Harrison	G	25	0	0	0	10	0	0	0	0

Goaltending

Player	MIN	GP	W	L	T	GA	GAA	SO
Mike Palmateer	3396	58	26	21	10	167	2.95	4
Paul Harrison	1403	25	8	12	3	82	3.51	1
Pierre Hamel	1	1	0	0	0	0	0.00	0
Team:	4800	80	34	33	13	249	3.11	5

=== Playoffs ===
Scoring

Player	Pos	GP	G	A	Pts	PIM	PPG	SHG	GWG
Darryl Sittler	C	6	5	4	9	17	2	0	0
Walt McKechnie	C	6	4	3	7	7	0	1	1
Dan Maloney	LW	6	3	3	6	2	1	0	1
Lanny McDonald	RW	6	3	2	5	0	0	0	0
Pat Boutette	C/RW	6	2	2	4	22	0	0	0
Ian Turnbull	D	6	0	4	4	27	0	0	0
Dave Hutchison	D	6	0	3	3	23	0	0	0
Ron Ellis	RW	6	1	1	2	2	0	0	0
John Anderson	RW	6	0	2	2	0	0	0	0
Rocky Saganiuk	RW/C	3	1	0	1	5	0	0	0
Dave Burrows	D	6	0	1	1	7	0	0	0
Paul Gardner	C	6	0	1	1	4	0	0	0
Joel Quenneville	D	6	0	1	1	4	0	0	0
Borje Salming	D	6	0	1	1	8	0	0	0
Ron Wilson	D	3	0	1	1	0	0	0	0
Jerry Butler	RW	6	0	0	0	4	0	0	0
Paul Harrison	G	2	0	0	0	0	0	0	0
Jimmy Jones	RW	6	0	0	0	4	0	0	0
Mike Palmateer	G	5	0	0	0	6	0	0	0
Tiger Williams	LW	6	0	0	0	48	0	0	0

Goaltending

Player	MIN	GP	W	L	GA	GAA	SO
Mike Palmateer	298	5	2	3	17	3.42	0
Paul Harrison	91	2	0	1	7	4.62	0
Team:	389	6	2	4	24	3.70	0

Note:

Pos = Position;GP = Games played; G = Goals; A = Assists; Pts = Points; PIM = Penalty minutes; +/- = Plus/minus; PPG = Power-play goals; SHG = Short-handed goals; GWG = Game-winning goals
Pos = Position;GP = Games played; Min, TOI = Minutes played; W = Wins; L = Losses; T,T/OT = Ties; OTL = Overtime losses; GA = Goals-against; GAA = Goals-against average; SO = Shutouts; SA = Shots against; SV = Shots saved;SV% = Save percentage;

== Playoffs ==
=== Preliminary round ===
Toronto Maple Leafs vs. Atlanta Flames

Date	Away	Score	Home	Score	Notes
April 10	Toronto	2	Atlanta	1	
April 12	Atlanta	4	Toronto	7	

Toronto wins best-of-three series 2 games to 0.

=== Quarter-finals ===
Toronto Maple Leafs vs. Montreal Canadiens

Date	Away	Score	Home	Score	Notes
April 16	Toronto	2	Montreal	5	
April 18	Toronto	1	Montreal	5	
April 21	Montreal	4	Toronto	3	(OT)
April 22	Montreal	5	Toronto	4	(OT)

Montreal wins best-of-seven series 4 games to 0.

== Awards and records ==
- Borje Salming, Second Team NHL All-Star, Defence

== Transactions ==
The Maple Leafs have been involved in the following transactions during the 1978–79 season.

=== Trades ===
September 13, 1978	To Vancouver Canucks Cash	To Toronto Maple Leafs Garry Monahan
October 5, 1978	To Minnesota North Stars 3rd round pick in 1980 – Randy Velischek	To Toronto Maple Leafs Walt McKechnie
October 19, 1978	To Colorado Rockies Jack Valiquette	To Toronto Maple Leafs 2nd round pick in 1981 – Gary Yaremchuk
March 13, 1979	To Colorado Rockies Don Ashby; Trevor Johansen	To Toronto Maple Leafs Paul Gardner

=== Waivers ===
July 4, 1979	To Edmonton Oilers Stan Weir

=== Expansion draft ===
June 13, 1979	To Hartford Whalers Jordy Douglas
June 13, 1979	To Winnipeg Jets Pierre Hamel
June 13, 1979	To Hartford Whalers Kevin Kemp
June 13, 1979	To Hartford Whalers Rick Ley
