= 1978–79 Boston Bruins season =

NHL team season

1978–79 Boston Bruins
- Adams Division champions
- Division: 1st Adams
- Conference: 2nd Wales
- 1978–79 record: 43–23–14
- Home record: 25–10–5
- Road record: 18–13–9
- Goals for: 316
- Goals against: 270

Team information
- General manager: Harry Sinden
- Coach: Don Cherry
- Captain: Wayne Cashman
- Alternate captains: None
- Arena: Boston Garden

Team leaders
- Goals: Rick Middleton (38)
- Assists: Terry O'Reilly (51)
- Points: Rick Middleton (86)
- Penalty minutes: Terry O'Reilly (205)
- Wins: Gerry Cheevers (23)
- Goals against average: Gerry Cheevers (3.16)

The 1978–79 Boston Bruins season was the team's 55th season in the National Hockey League (NHL). The Bruins captured their fourth straight division title but were defeated in the postseason in heartbreaking fashion in seven games to their hated rivals, the Montreal Canadiens, and denied an opportunity to play for the Stanley Cup. Don Cherry was subsequently let go as head coach following this defeat.

== Offseason ==
=== NHL draft ===
Round	Overall	Player	Nationality	Position
1	16	Al Secord	Canada	Left wing
2	35	Graeme Nicolson	Canada	Defenseman
3	52	Brad Knelson	Canada	Defenseman
4	68	George Buat	Canada	Right wing
5	85	Daryl MacLeod	United States	Left wing
6	102	Jeff Brubaker	United States	Left wing
7	119	Murray Skinner	Canada	Goalie
8	136	Bobby Hehir	United States	Center
9	153	Craig MacTavish	Canada	Center

== Regular season ==
- Al Secord made his NHL debut with the Bruins during the 1978–79 season.

=== Season standings ===
Adams Division
	GP	W	L	T	GF	GA	Pts
**Boston Bruins**	80	43	23	14	316	270	100
**Buffalo Sabres**	80	36	28	16	280	263	88
**Toronto Maple Leafs**	80	34	33	13	267	252	81
Minnesota North Stars	80	28	40	12	257	289	68

Note: W = Wins, L = Losses, T = Ties, GF = Goals For, GA = Goals Against, Pts = Points
Teams that qualified for the playoffs are highlighted in bold.

=== Record vs. opponents ===
Adams Division record vs. opponents

**Vs. Wales Conference**

**Vs. Campbell Conference**

**Vs. Adams Division**

1978–79 NHL records
Team	**BOS**	**BUF**	**MIN**	**TOR**	**Total**
Boston	—	4−3−1	5−0−3	5−1−2	**14−4−6**
Buffalo	3−4−1	—	5−2−1	4−3−1	**12−9−3**
Minnesota	0−5−3	2−5−1	—	2−4−2	**4−14−6**
Toronto	1−5−2	3−4−1	4−2−2	—	**8−11−5**

**Vs. Norris Division**

1978–79 NHL records
Team	**DET**	**LAK**	**MTL**	**PIT**	**WSH**	**Total**
Boston	3−1	1−3	0−2−2	1−2−1	3−0−1	**8−8−4**
Buffalo	3−1	2−1−1	0−4	0−2−2	3−0−1	**8−8−4**
Minnesota	2−1−1	1−3	1−3	1−3	2−2	**7−12−1**
Toronto	2−2	4−0	0−3−1	3−1	1−1−2	**10−7−3**

**Vs. Patrick Division**

1978–79 NHL records
Team	**ATL**	**NYI**	**NYR**	**PHI**	**Total**
Boston	3−1	1−2−2	3−2	1−3−1	**8−8−3**
Buffalo	2−2−1	2−1−1	1−2−1	0−3−2	**5−8−5**
Minnesota	2−1−1	1−3	2−1−1	2−2	**7−7−2**
Toronto	1−4	1−3	2−2−1	2−2−1	**6−11−2**

**Vs. Smythe Division**

1978–79 NHL records
Team	**CHI**	**COL**	**STL**	**VAN**	**Total**
Boston	3−1−1	3−1	3−1	4−0	**13−3−1**
Buffalo	2−2−1	3−0−1	3−0−1	3−1−1	**11−3−4**
Minnesota	2−2	2−3−1	2−1−1	4−1−1	**10−7−3**
Toronto	1−2−1	2−1−1	4−0	3−1−1	**10−4−3**

== Schedule and results ==
1978–79 regular season
October

Game	Result	Date	Score	Opponent	Record
1	W	October 12, 1978	8–2	Pittsburgh Penguins (1978–79)	1–0–0
2	T	October 14, 1978	4–4	@ Pittsburgh Penguins (1978–79)	1–0–1
3	W	October 15, 1978	4–2	Toronto Maple Leafs (1978–79)	2–0–1
4	W	October 18, 1978	3–2	@ Los Angeles Kings (1978–79)	3–0–1
5	W	October 20, 1978	5–1	@ Vancouver Canucks (1978–79)	4–0–1
6	L	October 22, 1978	5–6	@ Chicago Black Hawks (1978–79)	4–1–1
7	W	October 24, 1978	7–2	@ St. Louis Blues (1978–79)	5–1–1
8	T	October 25, 1978	2–2	@ Minnesota North Stars (1978–79)	5–1–2
9	W	October 28, 1978	5–3	@ Toronto Maple Leafs (1978–79)	6–1–2

November

Game	Result	Date	Score	Opponent	Record
10	W	November 2, 1978	4–1	New York Islanders (1978–79)	7–1–2
11	L	November 4, 1978	3–7	Philadelphia Flyers (1978–79)	7–2–2
12	T	November 5, 1978	1–1	Montreal Canadiens (1978–79)	7–2–3
13	W	November 9, 1978	6–2	Washington Capitals (1978–79)	8–2–3
14	L	November 11, 1978	1–7	@ Detroit Red Wings (1978–79)	8–3–3
15	T	November 12, 1978	4–4	@ Buffalo Sabres (1978–79)	8–3–4
16	L	November 16, 1978	4–6	Toronto Maple Leafs (1978–79)	8–4–4
17	W	November 17, 1978	6–2	@ Atlanta Flames (1978–79)	9–4–4
18	W	November 19, 1978	5–2	St. Louis Blues (1978–79)	10–4–4
19	W	November 23, 1978	5–2	Buffalo Sabres (1978–79)	11–4–4
20	T	November 25, 1978	5–5	@ Washington Capitals (1978–79)	11–4–5
21	W	November 26, 1978	4–2	Atlanta Flames (1978–79)	12–4–5
22	W	November 30, 1978	4–3	@ Buffalo Sabres (1978–79)	13–4–5

December

Game	Result	Date	Score	Opponent	Record
23	W	December 2, 1978	5–3	Philadelphia Flyers (1978–79)	14–4–5
24	W	December 3, 1978	3–2	@ New York Rangers (1978–79)	15–4–5
25	W	December 5, 1978	5–1	@ Toronto Maple Leafs (1978–79)	16–4–5
26	W	December 7, 1978	6–5	Detroit Red Wings (1978–79)	17–4–5
27	L	December 9, 1978	2–9	@ Philadelphia Flyers (1978–79)	17–5–5
28	T	December 10, 1978	4–4	Minnesota North Stars (1978–79)	17–5–6
29	W	December 12, 1978	7–3	Vancouver Canucks (1978–79)	18–5–6
30	W	December 14, 1978	5–2	Washington Capitals (1978–79)	19–5–6
31	W	December 16, 1978	4–1	New York Rangers (1978–79)	20–5–6
32	W	December 17, 1978	4–1	@ New York Rangers (1978–79)	21–5–6
33	W	December 21, 1978	4–2	Colorado Rockies (1978–79)	22–5–6
34	W	December 23, 1978	6–4	Buffalo Sabres (1978–79)	23–5–6
35	T	December 27, 1978	1–1	@ Toronto Maple Leafs (1978–79)	23–5–7
36	L	December 30, 1978	1–6	@ Montreal Canadiens (1978–79)	23–6–7
37	W	December 31, 1978	7–3	@ Buffalo Sabres (1978–79)	24–6–7

January

Game	Result	Date	Score	Opponent	Record
38	W	January 3, 1979	6–3	@ Chicago Black Hawks (1978–79)	25–6–7
39	W	January 5, 1979	5–3	@ Colorado Rockies (1978–79)	26–6–7
40	W	January 6, 1979	5–2	@ Minnesota North Stars (1978–79)	27–6–7
41	W	January 11, 1979	6–4	Minnesota North Stars (1978–79)	28–6–7
42	L	January 13, 1979	3–5	@ Pittsburgh Penguins (1978–79)	28–7–7
43	L	January 14, 1979	3–6	Los Angeles Kings (1978–79)	28–8–7
44	L	January 16, 1979	2–5	@ St. Louis Blues (1978–79)	28–9–7
45	W	January 18, 1979	4–0	St. Louis Blues (1978–79)	29–9–7
46	L	January 20, 1979	1–2	Buffalo Sabres (1978–79)	29–10–7
47	W	January 22, 1979	3–1	Atlanta Flames (1978–79)	30–10–7
48	L	January 25, 1979	2–4	New York Islanders (1978–79)	30–11–7
49	L	January 27, 1979	1–3	@ Montreal Canadiens (1978–79)	30–12–7
50	L	January 28, 1979	3–5	Los Angeles Kings (1978–79)	30–13–7
51	T	January 31, 1979	2–2	@ Chicago Black Hawks (1978–79)	30–13–8

February

Game	Result	Date	Score	Opponent	Record
52	W	February 1, 1979	6–1	Chicago Black Hawks (1978–79)	31–13–8
53	T	February 3, 1979	4–4	@ New York Islanders (1978–79)	31–13–9
54	W	February 4, 1979	6–1	Vancouver Canucks (1978–79)	32–13–9
55	L	February 14, 1979	1–5	@ New York Rangers (1978–79)	32–14–9
56	L	February 15, 1979	3–5	@ Philadelphia Flyers (1978–79)	32–15–9
57	T	February 17, 1979	3–3	@ Minnesota North Stars (1978–79)	32–15–10
58	W	February 20, 1979	5–3	@ Colorado Rockies (1978–79)	33–15–10
59	L	February 21, 1979	1–3	@ Los Angeles Kings (1978–79)	33–16–10
60	W	February 24, 1979	4–3	@ Vancouver Canucks (1978–79)	34–16–10
61	L	February 27, 1979	2–4	Colorado Rockies (1978–79)	34–17–10

March

Game	Result	Date	Score	Opponent	Record
62	T	March 1, 1979	4–4	Philadelphia Flyers (1978–79)	34–17–11
63	W	March 3, 1979	5–0	Minnesota North Stars (1978–79)	35–17–11
64	W	March 4, 1979	6–4	@ Detroit Red Wings (1978–79)	36–17–11
65	L	March 8, 1979	5–7	@ Atlanta Flames (1978–79)	36–18–11
66	W	March 10, 1979	4–3	@ Minnesota North Stars (1978–79)	37–18–11
67	T	March 11, 1979	4–4	New York Islanders (1978–79)	37–18–12
68	L	March 13, 1979	2–7	@ New York Islanders (1978–79)	37–19–12
69	L	March 15, 1979	4–7	New York Rangers (1978–79)	37–20–12
70	W	March 17, 1979	4–2	Chicago Black Hawks (1978–79)	38–20–12
71	W	March 19, 1979	4–3	Toronto Maple Leafs (1978–79)	39–20–12
72	L	March 22, 1979	1–3	Pittsburgh Penguins (1978–79)	39–21–12
73	W	March 24, 1979	5–2	Detroit Red Wings (1978–79)	40–21–12
74	L	March 28, 1979	2–9	@ Buffalo Sabres (1978–79)	40–22–12
75	W	March 29, 1979	7–4	Minnesota North Stars (1978–79)	41–22–12
76	W	March 31, 1979	4–1	@ Washington Capitals (1978–79)	42–22–12

April

Game	Result	Date	Score	Opponent	Record
77	T	April 1, 1979	3–3	Montreal Canadiens (1978–79)	42–22–13
78	T	April 4, 1979	3–3	@ Toronto Maple Leafs (1978–79)	42–22–14
79	L	April 5, 1979	3–9	Buffalo Sabres (1978–79)	42–23–14
80	W	April 8, 1979	6–3	Toronto Maple Leafs (1978–79)	43–23–14

Legend: Win (2 points) Loss (0 points) Tie (1 point)

== Player statistics ==
=== Regular season ===
Scoring

Player	Pos	GP	G	A	Pts	PIM	+/-	PPG	SHG	GWG
Rick Middleton	RW	71	38	48	86	7	33	12	1	5
Peter McNab	C	76	35	45	80	10	29	4	0	4
Terry O'Reilly	RW	80	26	51	77	205	7	3	0	5
Jean Ratelle	C	80	27	45	72	12	17	11	0	5
Wayne Cashman	LW	75	27	40	67	63	16	10	0	4
Bob Miller	C	77	15	33	48	30	20	0	0	1
Don Marcotte	LW	79	20	27	47	10	6	2	4	5
John Wensink	LW	76	28	18	46	106	20	0	0	4
Bobby Schmautz	RW	65	20	22	42	77	-1	6	1	4
Brad Park	D	40	7	32	39	10	28	3	0	0
Mike Milbury	D	74	1	34	35	149	23	0	0	0
Dick Redmond	D	64	7	26	33	21	0	4	0	1
Al Sims	D	67	9	20	29	28	22	0	0	2
Rick Smith	D	65	7	18	25	46	20	0	0	1
Dwight Foster	RW	44	11	13	24	14	-1	2	0	0
Al Secord	LW	71	16	7	23	125	7	0	0	0
Gary Doak	D	63	6	11	17	28	12	1	0	0
Stan Jonathan	LW	33	6	9	15	96	8	0	0	1
Dennis O'Brien	D	64	2	8	10	107	16	0	0	0
Mike Walton	C	14	4	2	6	0	-1	0	0	1
Bill Bennett	LW	7	1	4	5	2	4	0	0	0
Tom Songin	RW	17	3	1	4	0	-3	1	0	0
Gerry Cheevers	G	43	0	2	2	23	0	0	0	0
Ab DeMarco Jr.	D	3	0	0	0	0	0	0	0	0
Gilles Gilbert	G	23	0	0	0	16	0	0	0	0
Graeme Nicolson	D	1	0	0	0	0	0	0	0	0
Jim Pettie	G	19	0	0	0	17	0	0	0	0

Goaltending

Player	MIN	GP	W	L	T	GA	GAA	SO
Gerry Cheevers	2509	43	23	9	10	132	3.16	1
Gilles Gilbert	1254	23	12	8	2	74	3.54	0
Jim Pettie	1037	19	8	6	2	62	3.59	1
Team:	4800	80	43	23	14	268	3.35	2

=== Playoffs ===
Scoring

Player	Pos	GP	G	A	Pts	PIM	PPG	SHG	GWG
Jean Ratelle	C	11	7	6	13	2	2	0	2
Rick Middleton	RW	11	4	8	12	0	2	0	1
Wayne Cashman	LW	10	4	5	9	8	1	0	1
Don Marcotte	LW	11	5	3	8	10	0	0	0
Peter McNab	C	11	5	3	8	0	0	0	0
Mike Milbury	D	11	1	7	8	7	0	0	1
Terry O'Reilly	RW	11	0	6	6	25	0	0	0
Stan Jonathan	LW	11	4	1	5	12	0	0	0
Brad Park	D	11	1	4	5	8	0	0	1
Bobby Schmautz	RW	11	2	2	4	6	1	0	0
Dwight Foster	RW	11	1	3	4	0	0	0	0
Dick Redmond	D	11	1	3	4	2	0	1	0
Rick Smith	D	11	0	4	4	12	0	0	0
Bob Miller	C	11	1	1	2	8	0	0	0
Gary Doak	D	7	0	2	2	4	0	0	0
Al Sims	D	11	0	2	2	0	0	0	0
John Wensink	LW	8	0	1	1	19	0	0	0
Gerry Cheevers	G	6	0	0	0	0	0	0	0
Gilles Gilbert	G	5	0	0	0	0	0	0	0
Al Secord	LW	4	0	0	0	4	0	0	0

Goaltending

Player	MIN	GP	W	L	GA	GAA	SO
Gerry Cheevers	360	6	4	2	15	2.50	0
Gilles Gilbert	314	5	3	2	16	3.06	0
Team:	674	11	7	4	31	2.76	0

Note:

Pos = Position;GP = Games played; G = Goals; A = Assists; Pts = Points; PIM = Penalty minutes; +/- = Plus/minus; PPG = Power-play goals; SHG = Short-handed goals; GWG = Game-winning goals
Pos = Position;GP = Games played; Min, TOI = Minutes played; W = Wins; L = Losses; T,T/OT = Ties; OTL = Overtime losses; GA = Goals-against; GAA = Goals-against average; SO = Shutouts; SA = Shots against; SV = Shots saved;SV% = Save percentage;

== Playoffs ==
=== Quarterfinals ===
Pittsburgh Penguins vs. Boston Bruins

Date	Away	Score	Home	Score	Notes
April 16	Pittsburgh	2	Boston	6	
April 18	Pittsburgh	3	Boston	4	
April 21	Boston	2	Pittsburgh	1	
April 22	Boston	4	Pittsburgh	1	

Boston wins best-of-seven series 4 games to 0

=== Semifinals ===
Boston Bruins vs. Montreal Canadiens

In game seven of the Montreal-Boston semi-final, Boston's Rick Middleton scored with four minutes remaining in the third period to give the Bruins a 4–3 lead. Just over a minute later, linesman John D'Amico called a bench minor for too many men on the ice against the Bruins. Montreal's Guy Lafleur scored on the ensuing power play, sending the game to overtime, where Yvon Lambert gave the Canadiens the win and a trip to their fourth straight Stanley Cup Final.

Date	Away	Score	Home	Score	Notes
April 26	Boston	2	Montreal	4	
April 28	Boston	2	Montreal	5	
May 1	Montreal	1	Boston	2	
May 3	Montreal	3	Boston	4	(OT)
May 5	Boston	1	Montreal	5	
May 8	Montreal	2	Boston	5	
May 10	Boston	4	Montreal	5	(OT)

Montreal wins best-of-seven series 4 games to 3

- The 1979 NHL Playoffs would mark the end of Don Cherry's tenure with the Bruins. Cherry, who had an uneasy relationship with Bruins General Manager Harry Sinden, was fired by the Bruins after a critical coaching mistake during a 1979 semi-final playoff series against the Canadiens. Up by a goal with less than two minutes left in the seventh game, the Bruins were penalized for having too many men on the ice. The Canadiens' Guy Lafleur scored the tying goal on the subsequent powerplay and ultimately won the game in overtime. Montreal went on to defeat the New York Rangers for their fourth straight Cup title.
