= 1978–79 Vancouver Canucks season =

9th season in franchise history

1978–79 Vancouver Canucks
- Division: 2nd Smythe
- Conference: 6th Campbell
- 1978–79 record: 25–42–13
- Home record: 15–18–7
- Road record: 10–24–6
- Goals for: 217
- Goals against: 291

Team information
- General manager: Jake Milford
- Coach: Harry Neale
- Captain: Don Lever
- Alternate captains: Harold Snepsts; Chris Oddleifson
- Arena: Pacific Coliseum
- Average attendance: 13,622

Team leaders
- Goals: Ron Sedlbauer (40)
- Assists: Thomas Gradin (31); Dennis Kearns (31)
- Points: Ron Sedlbauer (56)
- Penalty minutes: Harold Snepsts (130)
- Wins: Glen Hanlon (12)
- Goals against average: Glen Hanlon (3.10)

The 1978–79 Vancouver Canucks season was the team's ninth in the National Hockey League (NHL).

== Offseason ==
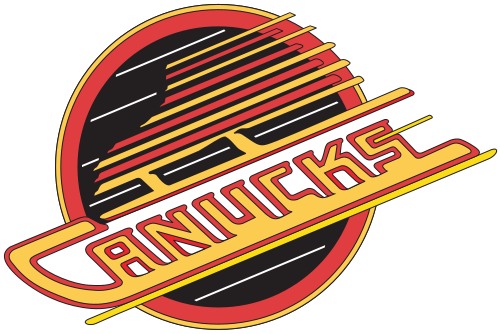
New Vancouver Canucks Logo

The Canucks radically changed their appearance by changing the team's colors, logo and jersey. The blue and green scheme was replaced with gold, red and black. The logo of a stylized 'C' was replaced by a stylized ice skate in the new colors with the blade over top the name 'Canucks'. For the jersey, the logo was displayed on shoulder patches while the main body had the team's new colors arranged in a 'V' pattern, for Vancouver. The home jerseys were primarily yellow, a rarity at the time as most teams used white as the primary color for their home uniforms.

== Regular season ==
=== Final standings ===
Smythe Division
	GP	W	L	T	GF	GA	Pts
Chicago Black Hawks	80	29	36	15	244	277	73
Vancouver Canucks	80	25	42	13	217	291	63
St. Louis Blues	80	18	50	12	249	348	48
Colorado Rockies	80	15	53	12	210	331	42

=== Record vs. opponents ===
Smythe Division record vs. opponents

Vs. Campbell Conference

Vs. Wales Conference

Vs. Smythe Division

1978–79 NHL records
Team	CHI	COL	STL	VAN	Total
Chicago	—	5–2–1	5–2–1	1–3–4	11–7–6
Colorado	2–5–1	—	4–2–2	1–6–1	7–13–4
St. Louis	2–5–1	2–4–2	—	1–4–3	5–13–6
Vancouver	3–1–4	6–1–1	4–1–3	—	13–3–8

Vs. Patrick Division

1978–79 NHL records
Team	ATL	NYI	NYR	PHI	Total
Chicago	1–2–2	2–3	0–4	3–1	6–10–2
Colorado	0–4	0–4–1	1–4	0–3–1	1–15–2
St. Louis	1–4	0–3–2	2–3	1–4	4–14–2
Vancouver	2–2	0–4	0–4	1–2–1	3–12–1

Vs. Adams Division

1978–79 NHL records
Team	BOS	BUF	MIN	TOR	Total
Chicago	1–3–1	2–2–1	2–2	2–1–1	7–8–3
Colorado	1–3	0–3–1	3–2–1	1–2–1	5–10–3
St. Louis	1–3	0–3–1	1–2–1	0–4	2–12–2
Vancouver	0–4	1–3–1	1–4–1	1–3–1	3–14–3

Vs. Norris Division

1978–79 NHL records
Team	DET	LAK	MTL	PIT	WSH	Total
Chicago	0–3–1	1–3	2–2	0–2–2	2–1–1	5–11–4
Colorado	0–3–1	0–2–2	0–4	1–3	1–3	2–15–3
St. Louis	3–1	1–2–1	0–4	1–2–1	2–2	7–12–1
Vancouver	3–1	1–3	0–3–1	1–3	1–3	6–12–2

== Schedule and results ==
1978–79 regular season
October

Game	Result	Date	Score	Opponent	Record
1	W	October 11, 1978	8–2	Colorado Rockies (1978–79)	1–0–0
2	W	October 13, 1978	8–4	St. Louis Blues (1978–79)	2–0–0
3	T	October 15, 1978	3–3	@ Chicago Black Hawks (1978–79)	2–0–1
4	L	October 17, 1978	6–8	@ St. Louis Blues (1978–79)	2–1–1
5	L	October 18, 1978	2–7	@ Minnesota North Stars (1978–79)	2–2–1
6	L	October 20, 1978	1–5	Boston Bruins (1978–79)	2–3–1
7	W	October 22, 1978	3–2	Buffalo Sabres (1978–79)	3–3–1
8	L	October 25, 1978	2–6	@ New York Rangers (1978–79)	3–4–1
9	L	October 28, 1978	2–5	@ New York Islanders (1978–79)	3–5–1
10	W	October 29, 1978	5–2	@ Philadelphia Flyers (1978–79)	4–5–1

November

Game	Result	Date	Score	Opponent	Record
11	W	November 1, 1978	1–0	@ Chicago Black Hawks (1978–79)	5–5–1
12	L	November 3, 1978	1–3	Toronto Maple Leafs (1978–79)	5–6–1
13	L	November 5, 1978	2–5	New York Rangers (1978–79)	5–7–1
14	L	November 7, 1978	2–4	@ Atlanta Flames (1978–79)	5–8–1
15	W	November 8, 1978	6–4	@ Detroit Red Wings (1978–79)	6–8–1
16	L	November 10, 1978	2–3	Minnesota North Stars (1978–79)	6–9–1
17	L	November 12, 1978	0–4	Philadelphia Flyers (1978–79)	6–10–1
18	L	November 16, 1978	3–6	Pittsburgh Penguins (1978–79)	6–11–1
19	L	November 18, 1978	2–4	Montreal Canadiens (1978–79)	6–12–1
20	W	November 21, 1978	5–2	Chicago Black Hawks (1978–79)	7–12–1
21	W	November 23, 1978	7–2	@ Colorado Rockies (1978–79)	8–12–1
22	L	November 25, 1978	2–5	New York Islanders (1978–79)	8–13–1
23	W	November 28, 1978	6–3	@ St. Louis Blues (1978–79)	9–13–1
24	T	November 29, 1978	1–1	@ Chicago Black Hawks (1978–79)	9–13–2

December

Game	Result	Date	Score	Opponent	Record
25	W	December 1, 1978	2–1	Detroit Red Wings (1978–79)	10–13–2
26	W	December 5, 1978	3–0	Atlanta Flames (1978–79)	11–13–2
27	W	December 7, 1978	4–2	Chicago Black Hawks (1978–79)	12–13–2
28	L	December 9, 1978	5–7	Washington Capitals (1978–79)	12–14–2
29	L	December 12, 1978	3–7	@ Boston Bruins (1978–79)	12–15–2
30	L	December 13, 1978	1–5	@ Toronto Maple Leafs (1978–79)	12–16–2
31	L	December 16, 1978	5–6	@ Pittsburgh Penguins (1978–79)	12–17–2
32	L	December 17, 1978	3–6	@ Buffalo Sabres (1978–79)	12–18–2
33	L	December 19, 1978	3–5	@ Minnesota North Stars (1978–79)	12–19–2
34	L	December 20, 1978	2–7	@ Detroit Red Wings (1978–79)	12–20–2
35	W	December 23, 1978	2–0	Los Angeles Kings (1978–79)	13–20–2
36	T	December 28, 1978	3–3	Buffalo Sabres (1978–79)	13–20–3
37	L	December 30, 1978	0–4	@ Los Angeles Kings (1978–79)	13–21–3

January

Game	Result	Date	Score	Opponent	Record
38	L	January 2, 1979	0–9	@ New York Islanders (1978–79)	13–22–3
39	W	January 3, 1979	5–3	@ Pittsburgh Penguins (1978–79)	14–22–3
40	L	January 5, 1979	4–6	@ New York Rangers (1978–79)	14–23–3
41	L	January 6, 1979	0–2	@ Montreal Canadiens (1978–79)	14–24–3
42	W	January 8, 1979	5–1	@ Toronto Maple Leafs (1978–79)	15–24–3
43	W	January 11, 1979	4–3	St. Louis Blues (1978–79)	16–24–3
44	T	January 13, 1979	3–3	@ St. Louis Blues (1978–79)	16–24–4
45	L	January 14, 1979	3–5	@ Washington Capitals (1978–79)	16–25–4
46	T	January 16, 1979	2–2	Montreal Canadiens (1978–79)	16–25–5
47	T	January 19, 1979	3–3	Toronto Maple Leafs (1978–79)	16–25–6
48	L	January 24, 1979	0–5	Chicago Black Hawks (1978–79)	16–26–6
49	W	January 26, 1979	4–1	St. Louis Blues (1978–79)	17–26–6
50	T	January 27, 1979	2–2	@ Colorado Rockies (1978–79)	17–26–7
51	L	January 30, 1979	3–5	New York Rangers (1978–79)	17–27–7

February

Game	Result	Date	Score	Opponent	Record
52	L	February 1, 1979	1–4	@ Atlanta Flames (1978–79)	17–28–7
53	W	February 3, 1979	5–1	@ Washington Capitals (1978–79)	18–28–7
54	L	February 4, 1979	1–6	@ Boston Bruins (1978–79)	18–29–7
55	T	February 13, 1979	3–3	@ St. Louis Blues (1978–79)	18–29–8
56	L	February 14, 1979	1–8	@ Minnesota North Stars (1978–79)	18–30–8
57	L	February 17, 1979	3–5	New York Islanders (1978–79)	18–31–8
58	T	February 20, 1979	3–3	Philadelphia Flyers (1978–79)	18–31–9
59	W	February 22, 1979	3–0	Colorado Rockies (1978–79)	19–31–9
60	L	February 24, 1979	3–4	Boston Bruins (1978–79)	19–32–9
61	L	February 26, 1979	0–2	@ Los Angeles Kings (1978–79)	19–33–9
62	T	February 28, 1979	4–4	Chicago Black Hawks (1978–79)	19–33–10

March

Game	Result	Date	Score	Opponent	Record
63	L	March 2, 1979	2–6	Washington Capitals (1978–79)	19–34–10
64	L	March 4, 1979	2–3	Los Angeles Kings (1978–79)	19–35–10
65	L	March 7, 1979	0–2	@ Toronto Maple Leafs (1978–79)	19–36–10
66	L	March 8, 1979	1–11	@ Montreal Canadiens (1978–79)	19–37–10
67	L	March 10, 1979	1–3	Colorado Rockies (1978–79)	19–38–10
68	L	March 13, 1979	3–9	Pittsburgh Penguins (1978–79)	19–39–10
69	L	March 15, 1979	2–4	@ Buffalo Sabres (1978–79)	19–40–10
70	W	March 16, 1979	4–1	@ Colorado Rockies (1978–79)	20–40–10
71	W	March 18, 1979	2–1	Atlanta Flames (1978–79)	21–40–10
72	T	March 21, 1979	1–1	St. Louis Blues (1978–79)	21–40–11
73	L	March 23, 1979	3–4	Buffalo Sabres (1978–79)	21–41–11
74	W	March 25, 1979	2–1	Minnesota North Stars (1978–79)	22–41–11
75	W	March 27, 1979	5–2	Detroit Red Wings (1978–79)	23–41–11
76	L	March 29, 1979	0–5	@ Philadelphia Flyers (1978–79)	23–42–11
77	W	March 31, 1979	2–0	@ Colorado Rockies (1978–79)	24–42–11

April

Game	Result	Date	Score	Opponent	Record
78	T	April 1, 1979	2–2	@ Chicago Black Hawks (1978–79)	24–42–12
79	W	April 3, 1979	2–1	Colorado Rockies (1978–79)	25–42–12
80	T	April 6, 1979	2–2	Minnesota North Stars (1978–79)	25–42–13

Legend: Win (2 points) Loss (0 points) Tie (1 point)

== Draft picks ==
Vancouver's draft picks at the 1978 NHL amateur draft held at the Queen Elizabeth Hotel in Montreal.

Round	#	Player	Nationality	College/Junior/Club team (League)
1	4	Bill Derlago	Canada	Brandon Wheat Kings (WCHL)
2	22	Curt Fraser	United States	Victoria Cougars (WCHL)
3	40	Stan Smyl	Canada	New Westminster Bruins (WCHL)
4	56	Harald Luckner	Sweden	Färjestad BK Karlstad (SEL)
4	57	Brad Smith	Canada	Sudbury Wolves (OMJHL)
6	90	Gerry Minor	Canada	Regina Pats (WCHL)
7	107	Dave Ross	Canada	Portland Winterhawks (WCHL)
8	124	Steve O'Neill	United States	Providence College (ECAC)
9	141	Charlie Antetomaso	United States	Boston College (ECAC)
10	158	Richard Martens	Canada	New Westminster Bruins (WCHL)

== See also ==
- 1978–79 NHL season
