= 1978–79 New York Islanders season =

National Hockey League team season

1978–79 New York Islanders
- Campbell Conference champions
- Patrick Division champions
- Division: 1st Patrick
- Conference: 1st Campbell
- 1978–79 record: 51–15–14
- Home record: 31–3–6
- Road record: 20–12–8
- Goals for: 358
- Goals against: 214

Team information
- General manager: Bill Torrey
- Coach: Al Arbour
- Captain: Clark Gillies
- Alternate captains: None
- Arena: Nassau Coliseum

Team leaders
- Goals: Mike Bossy (69)
- Assists: Bryan Trottier (87)
- Points: Bryan Trottier (134)
- Penalty minutes: Garry Howatt (205)
- Wins: Chico Resch (26)
- Goals against average: Chico Resch (2.50)

The 1978–79 New York Islanders season was the seventh season for the franchise in the National Hockey League (NHL). The New York Islanders finished first overall by one point over the defending Stanley Cup champions Montreal Canadiens in the regular season standings.

== Offseason ==
=== NHL draft ===
| Round | Pick | Player | Position | School/Club team |
|---|---|---|---|---|
| 1 | 15 | Steve Tambellini | Center | Lethbridge Broncos (WCHL) |
| 2 | 34 | Randy Johnston | Defense | Peterborough Petes (OMJHL) |
| 3 | 51 | Dwayne Lowdermilk | Defense | Seattle Breakers (WCHL) |
| 5 | 84 | Greg Hay | Left wing | Portland Winterhawks (WCHL) |
| 6 | 101 | Kelly Davis | Defense | Flin Flon Bombers (WCHL) |
| 7 | 118 | Richard Pepin | Left wing | Laval National (QMJHL) |
| 8 | 135 | Dave Cameron | Center | University of Prince Edward Island (CIAU) |
| 9 | 152 | Paul Joswiak | Goaltender | University of Minnesota (WCHA) |
| 10 | 169 | Scott Cameron | Defense | University of Notre Dame (WCHA) |
| 11 | 184 | Christer Lowdahl | Center | Örebro (Sweden) |
| 12 | 199 | Gunnar Persson | Defense | Brynäs IF Galve (Sweden) |

== Regular season ==
=== Season standings ===
Patrick Division
| | GP | W | L | T | GF | GA | Pts |
|---|---|---|---|---|---|---|---|
| New York Islanders | 80 | 51 | 15 | 14 | 358 | 214 | 116 |
| Philadelphia Flyers | 80 | 40 | 25 | 15 | 281 | 248 | 95 |
| New York Rangers | 80 | 40 | 29 | 11 | 316 | 292 | 91 |
| Atlanta Flames | 80 | 41 | 31 | 8 | 327 | 280 | 90 |

=== Record vs. opponents ===
Patrick Division record vs. opponents

Vs. Campbell Conference

Vs. Wales Conference

Vs. Patrick Division

1978–79 NHL records
| Team | ATL | NYI | NYR | PHI | Total |
|---|---|---|---|---|---|
| Atlanta | — | 2–6 | 4–3–1 | 4–4 | 10–13–1 |
| N.Y. Islanders | 6–2 | — | 5–3 | 5–1–2 | 16–6–2 |
| N.Y. Rangers | 3–4–1 | 3–5 | — | 2–3–3 | 8–12–4 |
| Philadelphia | 4–4 | 1–5–2 | 3–2–3 | — | 8–11–5 |

Vs. Smythe Division

1978–79 NHL records
| Team | CHI | COL | STL | VAN | Total |
|---|---|---|---|---|---|
| Atlanta | 2–1–2 | 4–0 | 4–1 | 2–2 | 12–4–2 |
| N.Y. Islanders | 3–2 | 4–0–1 | 3–0–2 | 4–0 | 14–2–3 |
| N.Y. Rangers | 4–0 | 4–1 | 3–2 | 4–0 | 15–3–0 |
| Philadelphia | 1–3 | 3–0–1 | 4–1 | 2–1–1 | 10–5–2 |

Vs. Adams Division

1978–79 NHL records
| Team | BOS | BUF | MIN | TOR | Total |
|---|---|---|---|---|---|
| Atlanta | 1–3 | 2–2–1 | 1–2–1 | 4–1 | 8–8–2 |
| N.Y. Islanders | 2–1–2 | 1–2–1 | 3–1 | 3–1 | 9–5–3 |
| N.Y. Rangers | 2–3 | 2–1–1 | 1–2–1 | 2–2–1 | 7–8–3 |
| Philadelphia | 3–1–1 | 3–0–2 | 2–2 | 2–2–1 | 10–5–4 |

Vs. Norris Division

1978–79 NHL records
| Team | DET | LAK | MTL | PIT | WSH | Total |
|---|---|---|---|---|---|---|
| Atlanta | 3–0–1 | 2–2 | 1–3 | 3–0–1 | 2–1–1 | 11–6–3 |
| N.Y. Islanders | 3–0–1 | 2–0–2 | 3–1 | 1–0–3 | 3–1 | 12–2–6 |
| N.Y. Rangers | 1–1–2 | 3–1 | 3–1 | 2–2 | 1–1–2 | 10–6–4 |
| Philadelphia | 2–0–2 | 4–0 | 0–3–1 | 3–1 | 3–0–1 | 12–4–4 |

== Schedule and results ==
1978–79 regular season
October

| Game | Result | Date | Score | Opponent | Record |
|---|---|---|---|---|---|
| 1 | T | October 12, 1978 | 2–2 | @ Buffalo Sabres (1978–79) | 0–0–1 |
| 2 | L | October 14, 1978 | 7–10 | @ Toronto Maple Leafs (1978–79) | 0–1–1 |
| 3 | W | October 17, 1978 | 3–1 | Montreal Canadiens (1978–79) | 1–1–1 |
| 4 | W | October 18, 1978 | 5–3 | @ Pittsburgh Penguins (1978–79) | 2–1–1 |
| 5 | W | October 21, 1978 | 5–3 | New York Rangers (1978–79) | 3–1–1 |
| 6 | T | October 24, 1978 | 4–4 | Philadelphia Flyers (1978–79) | 3–1–2 |
| 7 | L | October 27, 1978 | 5–8 | @ Atlanta Flames (1978–79) | 3–2–2 |
| 8 | W | October 28, 1978 | 5–2 | Vancouver Canucks (1978–79) | 4–2–2 |
| 9 | W | October 31, 1978 | 8–5 | Colorado Rockies (1978–79) | 5–2–2 |

November

| Game | Result | Date | Score | Opponent | Record |
|---|---|---|---|---|---|
| 10 | L | November 2, 1978 | 1–4 | @ Boston Bruins (1978–79) | 5–3–2 |
| 11 | W | November 4, 1978 | 4–1 | Washington Capitals (1978–79) | 6–3–2 |
| 12 | W | November 7, 1978 | 5–2 | Minnesota North Stars (1978–79) | 7–3–2 |
| 13 | W | November 11, 1978 | 4–2 | Atlanta Flames (1978–79) | 8–3–2 |
| 14 | W | November 12, 1978 | 5–3 | @ New York Rangers (1978–79) | 9–3–2 |
| 15 | T | November 14, 1978 | 2–2 | Colorado Rockies (1978–79) | 9–3–3 |
| 16 | W | November 17, 1978 | 4–2 | @ Washington Capitals (1978–79) | 10–3–3 |
| 17 | W | November 18, 1978 | 8–2 | Philadelphia Flyers (1978–79) | 11–3–3 |
| 18 | W | November 21, 1978 | 7–1 | @ Colorado Rockies (1978–79) | 12–3–3 |
| 19 | W | November 22, 1978 | 4–1 | @ Minnesota North Stars (1978–79) | 13–3–3 |
| 20 | W | November 25, 1978 | 5–2 | @ Vancouver Canucks (1978–79) | 14–3–3 |
| 21 | T | November 29, 1978 | 5–5 | @ Los Angeles Kings (1978–79) | 14–3–4 |

December

| Game | Result | Date | Score | Opponent | Record |
|---|---|---|---|---|---|
| 22 | W | December 2, 1978 | 5–2 | @ Colorado Rockies (1978–79) | 15–3–4 |
| 23 | T | December 5, 1978 | 3–3 | Pittsburgh Penguins (1978–79) | 15–3–5 |
| 24 | W | December 7, 1978 | 7–1 | St. Louis Blues (1978–79) | 16–3–5 |
| 25 | W | December 9, 1978 | 3–2 | @ Toronto Maple Leafs (1978–79) | 17–3–5 |
| 26 | L | December 10, 1978 | 3–4 | @ Montreal Canadiens (1978–79) | 17–4–5 |
| 27 | T | December 12, 1978 | 5–5 | Los Angeles Kings (1978–79) | 17–4–6 |
| 28 | W | December 14, 1978 | 4–1 | Detroit Red Wings (1978–79) | 18–4–6 |
| 29 | T | December 16, 1978 | 2–2 | @ St. Louis Blues (1978–79) | 18–4–7 |
| 30 | W | December 17, 1978 | 3–0 | @ Detroit Red Wings (1978–79) | 19–4–7 |
| 31 | W | December 21, 1978 | 5–1 | St. Louis Blues (1978–79) | 20–4–7 |
| 32 | W | December 23, 1978 | 9–4 | New York Rangers (1978–79) | 21–4–7 |
| 33 | W | December 26, 1978 | 5–1 | Toronto Maple Leafs (1978–79) | 22–4–7 |
| 34 | W | December 28, 1978 | 10–4 | @ Atlanta Flames (1978–79) | 23–4–7 |
| 35 | W | December 30, 1978 | 4–2 | Atlanta Flames (1978–79) | 24–4–7 |

January

| Game | Result | Date | Score | Opponent | Record |
|---|---|---|---|---|---|
| 36 | W | January 2, 1979 | 9–0 | Vancouver Canucks (1978–79) | 25–4–7 |
| 37 | L | January 4, 1979 | 2–3 | @ Philadelphia Flyers (1978–79) | 25–5–7 |
| 38 | W | January 6, 1979 | 5–1 | Philadelphia Flyers (1978–79) | 26–5–7 |
| 39 | W | January 9, 1979 | 7–1 | Los Angeles Kings (1978–79) | 27–5–7 |
| 40 | T | January 10, 1979 | 5–5 | @ Detroit Red Wings (1978–79) | 27–5–8 |
| 41 | W | January 12, 1979 | 4–1 | @ Atlanta Flames (1978–79) | 28–5–8 |
| 42 | T | January 14, 1979 | 1–1 | @ Philadelphia Flyers (1978–79) | 28–5–9 |
| 43 | W | January 16, 1979 | 6–2 | Washington Capitals (1978–79) | 29–5–9 |
| 44 | L | January 17, 1979 | 3–5 | @ New York Rangers (1978–79) | 29–6–9 |
| 45 | W | January 20, 1979 | 4–2 | Chicago Black Hawks (1978–79) | 30–6–9 |
| 46 | W | January 22, 1979 | 2–1 | @ Chicago Black Hawks (1978–79) | 31–6–9 |
| 47 | W | January 25, 1979 | 4–2 | @ Boston Bruins (1978–79) | 32–6–9 |
| 48 | L | January 27, 1979 | 2–7 | New York Rangers (1978–79) | 32–7–9 |
| 49 | L | January 30, 1979 | 4–5 | Minnesota North Stars (1978–79) | 32–8–9 |

February

| Game | Result | Date | Score | Opponent | Record |
|---|---|---|---|---|---|
| 50 | W | February 1, 1979 | 4–1 | @ Philadelphia Flyers (1978–79) | 33–8–9 |
| 51 | T | February 3, 1979 | 4–4 | Boston Bruins (1978–79) | 33–8–10 |
| 52 | L | February 4, 1979 | 4–5 | @ Chicago Black Hawks (1978–79) | 33–9–10 |
| 53 | W | February 13, 1979 | 6–1 | Colorado Rockies (1978–79) | 34–9–10 |
| 54 | L | February 14, 1979 | 1–2 | @ Buffalo Sabres (1978–79) | 34–10–10 |
| 55 | W | February 17, 1979 | 5–3 | @ Vancouver Canucks (1978–79) | 35–10–10 |
| 56 | W | February 19, 1979 | 8–3 | @ Los Angeles Kings (1978–79) | 36–10–10 |
| 57 | W | February 22, 1979 | 6–1 | St. Louis Blues (1978–79) | 37–10–10 |
| 58 | W | February 24, 1979 | 3–1 | Detroit Red Wings (1978–79) | 38–10–10 |
| 59 | L | February 25, 1979 | 2–3 | @ New York Rangers (1978–79) | 38–11–10 |
| 60 | W | February 27, 1979 | 7–3 | Montreal Canadiens (1978–79) | 39–11–10 |

March

| Game | Result | Date | Score | Opponent | Record |
|---|---|---|---|---|---|
| 61 | L | March 2, 1979 | 2–3 | @ Atlanta Flames (1978–79) | 39–12–10 |
| 62 | W | March 3, 1979 | 4–2 | Atlanta Flames (1978–79) | 40–12–10 |
| 63 | L | March 6, 1979 | 2–3 | Buffalo Sabres (1978–79) | 40–13–10 |
| 64 | T | March 7, 1979 | 5–5 | @ St. Louis Blues (1978–79) | 40–13–11 |
| 65 | W | March 10, 1979 | 7–1 | Chicago Black Hawks (1978–79) | 41–13–11 |
| 66 | T | March 11, 1979 | 4–4 | @ Boston Bruins (1978–79) | 41–13–12 |
| 67 | W | March 13, 1979 | 7–2 | Boston Bruins (1978–79) | 42–13–12 |
| 68 | W | March 15, 1979 | 6–2 | Toronto Maple Leafs (1978–79) | 43–13–12 |
| 69 | W | March 17, 1979 | 5–2 | New York Rangers (1978–79) | 44–13–12 |
| 70 | W | March 18, 1979 | 5–3 | @ Minnesota North Stars (1978–79) | 45–13–12 |
| 71 | W | March 22, 1979 | 5–3 | @ Montreal Canadiens (1978–79) | 46–13–12 |
| 72 | T | March 24, 1979 | 3–3 | Pittsburgh Penguins (1978–79) | 46–13–13 |
| 73 | T | March 25, 1979 | 2–2 | @ Pittsburgh Penguins (1978–79) | 46–13–14 |
| 74 | L | March 29, 1979 | 1–6 | @ Chicago Black Hawks (1978–79) | 46–14–14 |
| 75 | W | March 31, 1979 | 2–0 | Buffalo Sabres (1978–79) | 47–14–14 |

April

| Game | Result | Date | Score | Opponent | Record |
|---|---|---|---|---|---|
| 76 | L | April 1, 1979 | 4–6 | @ Washington Capitals (1978–79) | 47–15–14 |
| 77 | W | April 3, 1979 | 3–2 | Atlanta Flames (1978–79) | 48–15–14 |
| 78 | W | April 5, 1979 | 3–1 | @ Philadelphia Flyers (1978–79) | 49–15–14 |
| 79 | W | April 7, 1979 | 9–2 | Philadelphia Flyers (1978–79) | 50–15–14 |
| 80 | W | April 8, 1979 | 5–2 | @ New York Rangers (1978–79) | 51–15–14 |

Legend: Win (2 points) Loss (0 points) Tie (1 point)

== Playoffs ==
1979 Stanley Cup playoffs
Quarterfinals vs. (8) Chicago Black Hawks – Islanders win 4–0

| Game | Date | Visitor | Score | Home | OT | Series |
|---|---|---|---|---|---|---|
| 1 | April 16 | Chicago | 2 – 6 | NY Islanders | | 1 – 0 |
| 2 | April 18 | Chicago | 0 – 1 | NY Islanders | OT | 2 – 0 |
| 3 | April 20 | NY Islanders | 4 – 0 | Chicago | | 3 – 0 |
| 4 | April 22 | NY Islanders | 3 – 1 | Chicago | | 4 – 0 |

Semifinals vs. (4) New York Rangers – Rangers win 4–2

| Game | Date | Visitor | Score | Home | OT | Series |
|---|---|---|---|---|---|---|
| 1 | April 26 | NY Rangers | 4 – 1 | NY Islanders | | 0 – 1 |
| 2 | April 28 | NY Rangers | 3 – 4 | NY Islanders | OT | 1 – 1 |
| 3 | May 1 | NY Islanders | 1 – 3 | NY Rangers | | 1 – 2 |
| 4 | May 3 | NY Islanders | 3 – 2 | NY Rangers | OT | 2 – 2 |
| 5 | May 5 | NY Rangers | 4 – 3 | NY Islanders | | 2 – 3 |
| 6 | May 8 | NY Islanders | 1 – 2 | NY Rangers | | 2 – 4 |

Legend: Win Loss

== Player statistics ==
Regular season
Scoring

| Player | Pos | GP | G | A | Pts | PIM | +/- | PPG | SHG | GWG |
|---|---|---|---|---|---|---|---|---|---|---|
| Bryan Trottier | C | 76 | 47 | 87 | 134 | 50 | 76 | 15 | 0 | 8 |
| Mike Bossy | RW | 80 | 69 | 57 | 126 | 25 | 63 | 27 | 0 | 9 |
| Denis Potvin | D | 73 | 31 | 70 | 101 | 58 | 71 | 12 | 3 | 2 |
| Clark Gillies | LW | 75 | 35 | 56 | 91 | 68 | 57 | 11 | 0 | 5 |
| Stefan Persson | D | 78 | 10 | 56 | 66 | 57 | 38 | 6 | 0 | 1 |
| Bob Bourne | C | 80 | 30 | 31 | 61 | 48 | 34 | 4 | 1 | 2 |
| John Tonelli | LW | 73 | 17 | 39 | 56 | 44 | 29 | 1 | 0 | 4 |
| Billy Harris | RW | 80 | 15 | 39 | 54 | 18 | 26 | 0 | 0 | 5 |
| Wayne Merrick | C | 75 | 20 | 21 | 41 | 24 | 13 | 2 | 0 | 0 |
| Bob Nystrom | RW | 78 | 19 | 20 | 39 | 113 | 19 | 1 | 0 | 5 |
| Mike Kaszycki | C | 71 | 16 | 18 | 34 | 37 | 7 | 2 | 0 | 4 |
| Lorne Henning | C | 73 | 13 | 20 | 33 | 14 | 17 | 0 | 2 | 2 |
| Garry Howatt | LW | 75 | 16 | 12 | 28 | 205 | 6 | 0 | 0 | 2 |
| Dave Lewis | D | 79 | 5 | 18 | 23 | 43 | 43 | 0 | 0 | 0 |
| Bob Lorimer | D | 67 | 3 | 18 | 21 | 42 | 27 | 0 | 0 | 0 |
| Ed Westfall | D/RW | 55 | 5 | 11 | 16 | 4 | 0 | 0 | 1 | 1 |
| Gerry Hart | D | 50 | 2 | 14 | 16 | 78 | 30 | 0 | 0 | 1 |
| Pat Price | D | 55 | 3 | 11 | 14 | 50 | 18 | 0 | 0 | 0 |
| Bert Marshall | D | 45 | 1 | 8 | 9 | 29 | 9 | 0 | 0 | 0 |
| Richie Hansen | C | 12 | 1 | 6 | 7 | 4 | 9 | 0 | 0 | 0 |
| Chico Resch | G | 43 | 0 | 2 | 2 | 6 | 0 | 0 | 0 | 0 |
| Billy Smith | G | 40 | 0 | 2 | 2 | 54 | 0 | 0 | 0 | 0 |
| Mike Hordy | D | 2 | 0 | 0 | 0 | 0 | 0 | 0 | 0 | 0 |
| Hector Marini | RW | 1 | 0 | 0 | 0 | 2 | -2 | 0 | 0 | 0 |
| Alex McKendry | W | 4 | 0 | 0 | 0 | 0 | -1 | 0 | 0 | 0 |
| Steve Tambellini | C | 1 | 0 | 0 | 0 | 0 | -1 | 0 | 0 | 0 |

Goaltending

| Player | MIN | GP | W | L | T | GA | GAA | SO |
|---|---|---|---|---|---|---|---|---|
| Chico Resch | 2539 | 43 | 26 | 7 | 10 | 106 | 2.50 | 2 |
| Billy Smith | 2261 | 40 | 25 | 8 | 4 | 108 | 2.87 | 1 |
| Team: | 4800 | 80 | 51 | 15 | 14 | 214 | 2.67 | 3 |

Playoffs
Scoring

| Player | Pos | GP | G | A | Pts | PIM | PPG | SHG | GWG |
|---|---|---|---|---|---|---|---|---|---|
| Denis Potvin | D | 10 | 4 | 7 | 11 | 8 | 0 | 0 | 1 |
| Mike Bossy | RW | 10 | 6 | 2 | 8 | 2 | 2 | 0 | 1 |
| John Tonelli | LW | 10 | 1 | 6 | 7 | 0 | 0 | 0 | 0 |
| Bryan Trottier | C | 10 | 2 | 4 | 6 | 13 | 0 | 0 | 1 |
| Bob Nystrom | RW | 10 | 3 | 2 | 5 | 4 | 0 | 0 | 1 |
| Wayne Merrick | C | 10 | 2 | 3 | 5 | 2 | 0 | 0 | 0 |
| Bob Bourne | C | 10 | 1 | 3 | 4 | 6 | 0 | 0 | 0 |
| Mike Kaszycki | C | 10 | 1 | 3 | 4 | 4 | 0 | 0 | 0 |
| Bob Lorimer | D | 10 | 1 | 3 | 4 | 15 | 0 | 0 | 0 |
| Stefan Persson | D | 10 | 0 | 4 | 4 | 8 | 0 | 0 | 0 |
| Billy Harris | RW | 10 | 2 | 1 | 3 | 10 | 1 | 0 | 1 |
| Clark Gillies | LW | 10 | 1 | 2 | 3 | 11 | 0 | 0 | 0 |
| Ed Westfall | D/RW | 6 | 1 | 2 | 3 | 0 | 0 | 0 | 0 |
| Lorne Henning | C | 10 | 2 | 0 | 2 | 0 | 0 | 1 | 0 |
| Gerry Hart | D | 9 | 0 | 2 | 2 | 10 | 0 | 0 | 0 |
| Garry Howatt | LW | 9 | 0 | 1 | 1 | 18 | 0 | 0 | 0 |
| Pat Price | D | 7 | 0 | 1 | 1 | 25 | 0 | 0 | 0 |
| Dave Lewis | D | 10 | 0 | 0 | 0 | 4 | 0 | 0 | 0 |
| Hector Marini | RW | 1 | 0 | 0 | 0 | 0 | 0 | 0 | 0 |
| Chico Resch | G | 5 | 0 | 0 | 0 | 0 | 0 | 0 | 0 |
| Billy Smith | G | 5 | 0 | 0 | 0 | 4 | 0 | 0 | 0 |

Goaltending

| Player | MIN | GP | W | L | GA | GAA | SO |
|---|---|---|---|---|---|---|---|
| Billy Smith | 315 | 5 | 4 | 1 | 10 | 1.90 | 1 |
| Chico Resch | 300 | 5 | 2 | 3 | 11 | 2.20 | 1 |
| Team: | 615 | 10 | 6 | 4 | 21 | 2.05 | 2 |

Note: Pos = Position; GP = Games played; G = Goals; A = Assists; Pts = Points; +/- = plus/minus; PIM = Penalty minutes; PPG = Power-play goals; SHG = Short-handed goals; GWG = Game-winning goals
MIN = Minutes played; W = Wins; L = Losses; T = Ties; GA = Goals-against; GAA = Goals-against average; SO = Shutouts;

== Awards and records ==
- December 23/78: Bryan Trottier, Most Points, One Period, 6
