= 1978–79 St. Louis Blues season =

National Hockey League team season

1978–79 St. Louis Blues
- Division: 3rd Smythe
- Conference: 7th Campbell
- 1978–79 record: 18–50–12
- Home record: 14–20–6
- Road record: 4–30–6
- Goals for: 249
- Goals against: 348

Team information
- General manager: Emile Francis
- Coach: Barclay Plager
- Captain: Barry Gibbs
- Alternate captains: None
- Arena: Checkerdome

Team leaders
- Goals: Brian Sutter (41)
- Assists: Bernie Federko (64)
- Points: Bernie Federko (95)
- Penalty minutes: Brian Sutter (165)
- Wins: Phil Myre; Ed Staniowski (9)
- Goals against average: Ed Staniowski (3.83)

The 1978–79 St. Louis Blues season was the 12th for the franchise in St. Louis, Missouri. The Blues finished the season with a record of just 18 wins (a franchise low), 50 losses and just 12 ties, for an all-time franchise low of 48 points. The Blues finished out of the playoffs for the second straight season for the first time in franchise history, and the last time before the 2005–06 season, following the lockout.

== Regular season ==
=== Final standings ===
Smythe Division
	GP	W	L	T	GF	GA	Pts
Chicago Black Hawks	80	29	36	15	244	277	73
Vancouver Canucks	80	25	42	13	217	291	63
St. Louis Blues	80	18	50	12	249	348	48
Colorado Rockies	80	15	53	12	210	331	42

=== Record vs. opponents ===
Smythe Division record vs. opponents

Vs. Campbell Conference

Vs. Wales Conference

Vs. Smythe Division

1978–79 NHL records
Team	CHI	COL	STL	VAN	Total
Chicago	—	5–2–1	5–2–1	1–3–4	11–7–6
Colorado	2–5–1	—	4–2–2	1–6–1	7–13–4
St. Louis	2–5–1	2–4–2	—	1–4–3	5–13–6
Vancouver	3–1–4	6–1–1	4–1–3	—	13–3–8

Vs. Patrick Division

1978–79 NHL records
Team	ATL	NYI	NYR	PHI	Total
Chicago	1–2–2	2–3	0–4	3–1	6–10–2
Colorado	0–4	0–4–1	1–4	0–3–1	1–15–2
St. Louis	1–4	0–3–2	2–3	1–4	4–14–2
Vancouver	2–2	0–4	0–4	1–2–1	3–12–1

Vs. Adams Division

1978–79 NHL records
Team	BOS	BUF	MIN	TOR	Total
Chicago	1–3–1	2–2–1	2–2	2–1–1	7–8–3
Colorado	1–3	0–3–1	3–2–1	1–2–1	5–10–3
St. Louis	1–3	0–3–1	1–2–1	0–4	2–12–2
Vancouver	0–4	1–3–1	1–4–1	1–3–1	3–14–3

Vs. Norris Division

1978–79 NHL records
Team	DET	LAK	MTL	PIT	WSH	Total
Chicago	0–3–1	1–3	2–2	0–2–2	2–1–1	5–11–4
Colorado	0–3–1	0–2–2	0–4	1–3	1–3	2–15–3
St. Louis	3–1	1–2–1	0–4	1–2–1	2–2	7–12–1
Vancouver	3–1	1–3	0–3–1	1–3	1–3	6–12–2

== Schedule and results ==
1978–79 regular season
October

Game	Result	Date	Score	Opponent	Record
1	W	October 11, 1978	5–4	@ Detroit Red Wings (1978–79)	1–0–0
2	L	October 13, 1978	4–8	@ Vancouver Canucks (1978–79)	1–1–0
3	L	October 14, 1978	2–6	@ Los Angeles Kings (1978–79)	1–2–0
4	W	October 17, 1978	8–6	Vancouver Canucks (1978–79)	2–2–0
5	T	October 20, 1978	5–5	@ Colorado Rockies (1978–79)	2–2–1
6	L	October 21, 1978	3–4	Colorado Rockies (1978–79)	2–3–1
7	L	October 24, 1978	2–7	Boston Bruins (1978–79)	2–4–1
8	T	October 25, 1978	6–6	@ Pittsburgh Penguins (1978–79)	2–4–2
9	T	October 28, 1978	7–7	Buffalo Sabres (1978–79)	2–4–3
10	L	October 31, 1978	2–5	Atlanta Flames (1978–79)	2–5–3

November

Game	Result	Date	Score	Opponent	Record
11	L	November 1, 1978	1–9	@ Minnesota North Stars (1978–79)	2–6–3
12	T	November 4, 1978	5–5	Chicago Black Hawks (1978–79)	2–6–4
13	L	November 5, 1978	1–3	@ Chicago Black Hawks (1978–79)	2–7–4
14	L	November 7, 1978	0–5	Toronto Maple Leafs (1978–79)	2–8–4
15	W	November 11, 1978	5–3	Colorado Rockies (1978–79)	3–8–4
16	L	November 14, 1978	2–4	Los Angeles Kings (1978–79)	3–9–4
17	L	November 16, 1978	2–6	@ Buffalo Sabres (1978–79)	3–10–4
18	L	November 18, 1978	1–3	@ Toronto Maple Leafs (1978–79)	3–11–4
19	L	November 19, 1978	2–5	@ Boston Bruins (1978–79)	3–12–4
20	L	November 21, 1978	3–4	Washington Capitals (1978–79)	3–13–4
21	W	November 22, 1978	3–1	@ Washington Capitals (1978–79)	4–13–4
22	L	November 24, 1978	1–4	@ Atlanta Flames (1978–79)	4–14–4
23	W	November 25, 1978	4–0	Detroit Red Wings (1978–79)	5–14–4
24	L	November 28, 1978	3–6	Vancouver Canucks (1978–79)	5–15–4
25	L	November 30, 1978	0–3	@ Philadelphia Flyers (1978–79)	5–16–4

December

Game	Result	Date	Score	Opponent	Record
26	W	December 2, 1978	5–2	Washington Capitals (1978–79)	6–16–4
27	L	December 6, 1978	4–7	@ New York Rangers (1978–79)	6–17–4
28	L	December 7, 1978	1–7	@ New York Islanders (1978–79)	6–18–4
29	L	December 9, 1978	2–4	Chicago Black Hawks (1978–79)	6–19–4
30	L	December 12, 1978	0–6	Montreal Canadiens (1978–79)	6–20–4
31	L	December 13, 1978	0–3	@ Pittsburgh Penguins (1978–79)	6–21–4
32	T	December 16, 1978	2–2	New York Islanders (1978–79)	6–21–5
33	L	December 17, 1978	1–4	@ Philadelphia Flyers (1978–79)	6–22–5
34	W	December 19, 1978	7–4	Atlanta Flames (1978–79)	7–22–5
35	L	December 21, 1978	1–5	@ New York Islanders (1978–79)	7–23–5
36	L	December 23, 1978	1–6	Toronto Maple Leafs (1978–79)	7–24–5
37	L	December 26, 1978	4–6	Minnesota North Stars (1978–79)	7–25–5
38	L	December 27, 1978	3–4	@ Chicago Black Hawks (1978–79)	7–26–5
39	W	December 30, 1978	6–3	Philadelphia Flyers (1978–79)	8–26–5

January

Game	Result	Date	Score	Opponent	Record
40	L	January 2, 1979	2–4	@ Colorado Rockies (1978–79)	8–27–5
41	T	January 3, 1979	3–3	@ Minnesota North Stars (1978–79)	8–27–6
42	L	January 6, 1979	1–4	Colorado Rockies (1978–79)	8–28–6
43	L	January 9, 1979	3–5	New York Rangers (1978–79)	8–29–6
44	L	January 11, 1979	3–4	@ Vancouver Canucks (1978–79)	8–30–6
45	T	January 13, 1979	3–3	Vancouver Canucks (1978–79)	8–30–7
46	W	January 16, 1979	5–2	Boston Bruins (1978–79)	9–30–7
47	L	January 18, 1979	0–4	@ Boston Bruins (1978–79)	9–31–7
48	W	January 20, 1979	3–2	New York Rangers (1978–79)	10–31–7
49	L	January 23, 1979	3–6	Montreal Canadiens (1978–79)	10–32–7
50	L	January 26, 1979	1–4	@ Vancouver Canucks (1978–79)	10–33–7
51	W	January 28, 1979	7–2	@ Chicago Black Hawks (1978–79)	11–33–7
52	W	January 30, 1979	7–1	Los Angeles Kings (1978–79)	12–33–7
53	L	January 31, 1979	1–5	@ Toronto Maple Leafs (1978–79)	12–34–7

February

Game	Result	Date	Score	Opponent	Record
54	W	February 3, 1979	6–3	Colorado Rockies (1978–79)	13–34–7
55	L	February 4, 1979	1–3	@ Buffalo Sabres (1978–79)	13–35–7
56	T	February 13, 1979	3–3	Vancouver Canucks (1978–79)	13–35–8
57	L	February 17, 1979	1–5	Chicago Black Hawks (1978–79)	13–36–8
58	L	February 18, 1979	4–6	Atlanta Flames (1978–79)	13–37–8
59	L	February 21, 1979	3–7	@ New York Rangers (1978–79)	13–38–8
60	L	February 22, 1979	1–6	@ New York Islanders (1978–79)	13–39–8
61	L	February 24, 1979	4–6	@ Montreal Canadiens (1978–79)	13–40–8
62	W	February 27, 1979	4–1	New York Rangers (1978–79)	14–40–8
63	W	February 28, 1979	6–5	@ Detroit Red Wings (1978–79)	15–40–8

March

Game	Result	Date	Score	Opponent	Record
64	W	March 3, 1979	8–4	Pittsburgh Penguins (1978–79)	16–40–8
65	T	March 7, 1979	5–5	New York Islanders (1978–79)	16–40–9
66	L	March 10, 1979	5–7	@ Washington Capitals (1978–79)	16–41–9
67	W	March 11, 1979	8–2	Minnesota North Stars (1978–79)	17–41–9
68	T	March 13, 1979	5–5	@ Colorado Rockies (1978–79)	17–41–10
69	L	March 17, 1979	1–3	Detroit Red Wings (1978–79)	17–42–10
70	L	March 18, 1979	3–5	@ Philadelphia Flyers (1978–79)	17–43–10
71	T	March 21, 1979	1–1	@ Vancouver Canucks (1978–79)	17–43–11
72	T	March 22, 1979	3–3	@ Los Angeles Kings (1978–79)	17–43–12
73	L	March 25, 1979	2–8	@ Atlanta Flames (1978–79)	17–44–12
74	L	March 26, 1979	2–4	Buffalo Sabres (1978–79)	17–45–12
75	L	March 29, 1979	2–5	@ Montreal Canadiens (1978–79)	17–46–12
76	L	March 31, 1979	2–4	Philadelphia Flyers (1978–79)	17–47–12

April

Game	Result	Date	Score	Opponent	Record
77	L	April 1, 1979	5–9	@ Colorado Rockies (1978–79)	17–48–12
78	L	April 3, 1979	2–3	Pittsburgh Penguins (1978–79)	17–49–12
79	W	April 7, 1979	4–1	Chicago Black Hawks (1978–79)	18–49–12
80	L	April 8, 1979	2–3	@ Chicago Black Hawks (1978–79)	18–50–12

Legend: Win (2 points) Loss (0 points) Tie (1 point)

== Player statistics ==
=== Regular season ===
Scoring

Player	Pos	GP	G	A	Pts	PIM	+/-	PPG	SHG	GWG
Bernie Federko	C	74	31	64	95	14	-15	7	0	1
Brian Sutter	LW	77	41	39	80	165	-2	12	0	3
Wayne Babych	RW	67	27	36	63	75	-11	11	0	0
Garry Unger	C	80	30	26	56	44	-44	3	0	3
Larry Patey	C	78	15	19	34	60	-27	0	2	2
Inge Hammarstrom	LW	65	12	22	34	8	-13	0	0	1
Jack Brownschidle	D	64	10	24	34	14	-21	5	0	1
Curt Bennett	LW	74	14	19	33	62	-23	1	0	1
Barry Gibbs	D	76	2	27	29	46	-42	0	0	0
Larry Giroux	D	73	5	22	27	111	-25	0	0	1
Bob Murdoch	RW	54	13	13	26	17	-6	1	0	3
Mike Zuke	C	34	9	17	26	18	-8	3	0	0
Tony Currie	RW	36	4	15	19	0	-9	1	0	2
Mike Walton	C	22	7	11	18	6	-13	3	0	0
Bob Stewart	D	78	5	13	18	47	-28	1	0	0
John Smrke	LW	55	6	8	14	20	-24	0	1	0
Harvey Bennett	C	52	3	9	12	63	-18	0	0	0
Mike Crombeen	RW	37	3	8	11	34	-13	0	0	0
Bob Hess	D	27	3	4	7	14	-20	0	0	0
Brian Ogilvie	C	14	1	5	6	7	-3	0	0	0
Jamie Masters	D	10	0	6	6	0	-6	0	0	0
Doug Palazzari	C	20	2	3	5	4	-5	0	0	0
Bruce Affleck	D	26	1	3	4	12	-13	0	0	0
Rick Bowness	RW	24	1	3	4	30	-17	0	0	0
Dick Lamby	D	9	0	4	4	12	5	0	0	0
Rick Shinske	C	11	0	4	4	2	-3	0	0	0
Neil Komadoski	D	42	1	2	3	30	0	0	0	0
Steve Durbano	D	13	1	1	2	103	-7	0	0	0
Ken Richardson	C	16	1	1	2	2	-5	0	0	0
Neil LaBatte	C/D	22	0	2	2	13	-1	0	0	0
Bill Fairbairn	RW	5	1	0	1	0	-2	0	0	0
Rod Seiling	D	3	0	1	1	4	-1	0	0	0
Ed Staniowski	G	39	0	1	1	2	0	0	0	0
Doug Grant	G	4	0	0	0	0	0	0	0	0
Gord McTavish	C	1	0	0	0	0	-2	0	0	0
Phil Myre	G	39	0	0	0	6	0	0	0	0
Terry Richardson	G	1	0	0	0	0	0	0	0	0

Goaltending

Player	MIN	GP	W	L	T	GA	GAA	SO
Phil Myre	2259	39	9	22	8	163	4.33	1
Ed Staniowski	2291	39	9	25	3	146	3.82	0
Doug Grant	190	4	0	2	1	23	7.26	0
Terry Richardson	60	1	0	1	0	9	9.00	0
Team:	4800	80	18	50	12	341	4.26	1

Note:

Pos = Position;GP = Games played; G = Goals; A = Assists; Pts = Points; PIM = Penalty minutes; +/- = Plus/minus; PPG = Power-play goals; SHG = Short-handed goals; GWG = Game-winning goals
Pos = Position;GP = Games played; Min, TOI = Minutes played; W = Wins; L = Losses; T,T/OT = Ties; OTL = Overtime losses; GA = Goals-against; GAA = Goals-against average; SO = Shutouts; SA = Shots against; SV = Shots saved;SV% = Save percentage;

== Draft picks ==
St. Louis's draft picks at the 1978 NHL amateur draft held at the Queen Elizabeth Hotel in Montreal.

Round	#	Player	Nationality	College/Junior/Club team (League)
1	3	Wayne Babych	Canada	Portland Winterhawks (WCHL)
3	39	Steve Harrison	Canada	Toronto Marlboros (OMJHL)
5	72	Kevin Willison	Canada	Billings Bighorns (WCHL)
6	89	Jim Nill	Canada	Medicine Hat Tigers (WCHL)
7	106	Steve Stockman	Canada	Cornwall Royals (QMJHL)
7	109	Paul MacLean	Canada	Hull Olympiques (QMJHL)
8	123	Denis Houle	Canada	Hamilton Fincups (OMJHL)
9	140	Tony Meagher	Canada	Boston University (ECAC)
9	143	Rick Simpson	Canada	Medicine Hat Tigers (WCHL)
10	157	Jim Lockhurst	Canada	Kingston Canadians (OMJHL)
10	160	Bob Froese	Canada	Niagara Falls Flyers (OMJHL)
10	170	Dan Lerg	United States	University of Michigan (WCHA)
11	173	Risto Siltanen	Finland	Ilves (Finland)
11	175	Dan Hermansson	Sweden	Karlskoga (Sweden)
11	181	Jean-Francois Boutin	Canada	Verdun Eperviers (QMJHL)
11	185	John Sullivan	United States	Providence College (ECAC)
12	188	Serge Menard	Canada	Montreal Juniors (QMJHL)
12	191	Don Boyd	Canada	Rensselaer Polytechnic Institute (ECAC)
12	197	Paul Stasiuk	Canada	Providence College (ECAC)
12	200	Gerd Truntschka	West Germany	EV Cologne (West Germany)
13	203	Viktor Shkurdyuk	Soviet Union	Leningrad (USSR)
13	205	Carl Bloomberg	United States	St. Louis University (CCHA)
13	207	Terry Kitching	Canada	St. Louis University (CCHA)
13	209	Brian O'Connor	United States	Boston University (ECAC)
13	210	Brian Crombeen	Canada	Kingston Canadians (OMJHL)
13	211	Mike Pidgeon	Canada	Oshawa Generals (OMJHL)
14	214	John Cochrane	United States	Harvard University (ECAC)
14	216	Joe Casey	United States	Boston College (ECAC)
14	218	Jim Farrell	United States	Princeton University (ECAC)
14	220	Frank Johnson	United States	Providence College (ECAC)
14	221	Blair Wheeler	Canada	Yale University (ECAC)

== See also ==
- 1978–79 NHL season
