= 1978–79 Buffalo Sabres season =

NHL hockey team season

1978–79 Buffalo Sabres
- Division: 2nd Adams
- Conference: 3rd Wales
- 1978–79 record: 36–28–16
- Home record: 25–7–8
- Road record: 19–12–9
- Goals for: 280
- Goals against: 263

Team information
- General manager: John Anderson
- Coach: Marcel Pronovost; Billy Inglis
- Captain: Danny Gare
- Alternate captains: None
- Arena: Buffalo Memorial Auditorium
- Average attendance: 16,433

Team leaders
- Goals: Rick Martin (32)
- Assists: Gilbert Perreault (58)
- Points: Gilbert Perreault (85)
- Penalty minutes: Jerry Korab (104)
- Wins: Don Edwards (26)
- Goals against average: Don Edwards (3.02)

The 1978–79 Buffalo Sabres season was the Sabres' ninth season of operation for the National Hockey League (NHL) franchise that was established on May 22, 1970.

== Regular season ==
=== Final standings ===
Adams Division
	GP	W	L	T	GF	GA	Pts
**Boston Bruins**	80	43	23	14	316	270	100
**Buffalo Sabres**	80	36	28	16	280	263	88
**Toronto Maple Leafs**	80	34	33	13	267	252	81
Minnesota North Stars	80	28	40	12	257	289	68

Note: W = Wins, L = Losses, T = Ties, GF = Goals For, GA = Goals Against, Pts = Points
Teams that qualified for the playoffs are highlighted in bold.

=== Record vs. opponents ===
Adams Division record vs. opponents

**Vs. Wales Conference**

**Vs. Campbell Conference**

**Vs. Adams Division**

1978–79 NHL records
Team	**BOS**	**BUF**	**MIN**	**TOR**	**Total**
Boston	—	4−3−1	5−0−3	5−1−2	**14−4−6**
Buffalo	3−4−1	—	5−2−1	4−3−1	**12−9−3**
Minnesota	0−5−3	2−5−1	—	2−4−2	**4−14−6**
Toronto	1−5−2	3−4−1	4−2−2	—	**8−11−5**

**Vs. Norris Division**

1978–79 NHL records
Team	**DET**	**LAK**	**MTL**	**PIT**	**WSH**	**Total**
Boston	3−1	1−3	0−2−2	1−2−1	3−0−1	**8−8−4**
Buffalo	3−1	2−1−1	0−4	0−2−2	3−0−1	**8−8−4**
Minnesota	2−1−1	1−3	1−3	1−3	2−2	**7−12−1**
Toronto	2−2	4−0	0−3−1	3−1	1−1−2	**10−7−3**

**Vs. Patrick Division**

1978–79 NHL records
Team	**ATL**	**NYI**	**NYR**	**PHI**	**Total**
Boston	3−1	1−2−2	3−2	1−3−1	**8−8−3**
Buffalo	2−2−1	2−1−1	1−2−1	0−3−2	**5−8−5**
Minnesota	2−1−1	1−3	2−1−1	2−2	**7−7−2**
Toronto	1−4	1−3	2−2−1	2−2−1	**6−11−2**

**Vs. Smythe Division**

1978–79 NHL records
Team	**CHI**	**COL**	**STL**	**VAN**	**Total**
Boston	3−1−1	3−1	3−1	4−0	**13−3−1**
Buffalo	2−2−1	3−0−1	3−0−1	3−1−1	**11−3−4**
Minnesota	2−2	2−3−1	2−1−1	4−1−1	**10−7−3**
Toronto	1−2−1	2−1−1	4−0	3−1−1	**10−4−3**

== Schedule and results ==
1978–79 regular season
October

Game	Result	Date	Score	Opponent	Record
1	T	October 12, 1978	2–2	New York Islanders (1978–79)	0–0–1
2	W	October 14, 1978	5–2	@ Minnesota North Stars (1978–79)	1–0–1
3	L	October 15, 1978	2–3	Detroit Red Wings (1978–79)	1–1–1
4	L	October 18, 1978	0–2	@ Toronto Maple Leafs (1978–79)	1–2–1
5	W	October 19, 1978	1–0	Toronto Maple Leafs (1978–79)	2–2–1
6	L	October 22, 1978	2–3	@ Vancouver Canucks (1978–79)	2–3–1
7	L	October 26, 1978	0–6	@ Los Angeles Kings (1978–79)	2–4–1
8	T	October 28, 1978	7–7	@ St. Louis Blues (1978–79)	2–4–2

November

Game	Result	Date	Score	Opponent	Record
9	T	November 2, 1978	3–3	@ Philadelphia Flyers (1978–79)	2–4–3
10	L	November 4, 1978	1–2	@ Minnesota North Stars (1978–79)	2–5–3
11	W	November 5, 1978	2–1	Minnesota North Stars (1978–79)	3–5–3
12	T	November 9, 1978	4–4	Pittsburgh Penguins (1978–79)	3–5–4
13	W	November 11, 1978	2–0	@ Washington Capitals (1978–79)	4–5–4
14	T	November 12, 1978	4–4	Boston Bruins (1978–79)	4–5–5
15	T	November 15, 1978	2–2	@ Toronto Maple Leafs (1978–79)	4–5–6
16	W	November 16, 1978	6–2	St. Louis Blues (1978–79)	5–5–6
17	W	November 18, 1978	3–1	@ Detroit Red Wings (1978–79)	6–5–6
18	W	November 19, 1978	9–2	Minnesota North Stars (1978–79)	7–5–6
19	L	November 22, 1978	2–3	Philadelphia Flyers (1978–79)	7–6–6
20	L	November 23, 1978	2–5	@ Boston Bruins (1978–79)	7–7–6
21	W	November 26, 1978	4–1	Colorado Rockies (1978–79)	8–7–6
22	L	November 30, 1978	3–4	Boston Bruins (1978–79)	8–8–6

December

Game	Result	Date	Score	Opponent	Record
23	L	December 2, 1978	1–8	@ Montreal Canadiens (1978–79)	8–9–6
24	L	December 3, 1978	1–4	Montreal Canadiens (1978–79)	8–10–6
25	T	December 7, 1978	3–3	Los Angeles Kings (1978–79)	8–10–7
26	T	December 9, 1978	4–4	@ Pittsburgh Penguins (1978–79)	8–10–8
27	W	December 10, 1978	5–3	Toronto Maple Leafs (1978–79)	9–10–8
28	W	December 13, 1978	6–2	@ Chicago Black Hawks (1978–79)	10–10–8
29	W	December 14, 1978	3–2	Chicago Black Hawks (1978–79)	11–10–8
30	W	December 16, 1978	5–2	@ Minnesota North Stars (1978–79)	12–10–8
31	W	December 17, 1978	6–3	Vancouver Canucks (1978–79)	13–10–8
32	L	December 20, 1978	3–6	@ New York Rangers (1978–79)	13–11–8
33	W	December 21, 1978	5–4	Atlanta Flames (1978–79)	14–11–8
34	L	December 23, 1978	4–6	@ Boston Bruins (1978–79)	14–12–8
35	W	December 27, 1978	5–2	@ Colorado Rockies (1978–79)	15–12–8
36	T	December 28, 1978	3–3	@ Vancouver Canucks (1978–79)	15–12–9
37	L	December 31, 1978	3–7	Boston Bruins (1978–79)	15–13–9

January

Game	Result	Date	Score	Opponent	Record
38	T	January 4, 1979	3–3	Chicago Black Hawks (1978–79)	15–13–10
39	W	January 7, 1979	4–3	Detroit Red Wings (1978–79)	16–13–10
40	L	January 9, 1979	3–5	@ Atlanta Flames (1978–79)	16–14–10
41	W	January 11, 1979	6–2	Washington Capitals (1978–79)	17–14–10
42	L	January 13, 1979	2–5	@ Montreal Canadiens (1978–79)	17–15–10
43	L	January 14, 1979	4–5	Pittsburgh Penguins (1978–79)	17–16–10
44	T	January 18, 1979	4–4	@ Philadelphia Flyers (1978–79)	17–16–11
45	W	January 20, 1979	2–1	@ Boston Bruins (1978–79)	18–16–11
46	L	January 25, 1979	4–5	New York Rangers (1978–79)	18–17–11
47	W	January 27, 1979	6–3	@ Detroit Red Wings (1978–79)	19–17–11
48	L	January 28, 1979	1–3	Minnesota North Stars (1978–79)	19–18–11
49	L	January 31, 1979	2–5	Atlanta Flames (1978–79)	19–19–11

February

Game	Result	Date	Score	Opponent	Record
50	W	February 3, 1979	2–1	@ Minnesota North Stars (1978–79)	20–19–11
51	W	February 4, 1979	3–1	St. Louis Blues (1978–79)	21–19–11
52	W	February 14, 1979	2–1	New York Islanders (1978–79)	22–19–11
53	W	February 15, 1979	4–3	New York Rangers (1978–79)	23–19–11
54	L	February 17, 1979	3–6	@ Pittsburgh Penguins (1978–79)	23–20–11
55	L	February 18, 1979	2–5	Montreal Canadiens (1978–79)	23–21–11
56	L	February 21, 1979	2–3	@ Chicago Black Hawks (1978–79)	23–22–11
57	L	February 22, 1979	2–4	Chicago Black Hawks (1978–79)	23–23–11
58	W	February 24, 1979	6–4	@ Washington Capitals (1978–79)	24–23–11
59	W	February 26, 1979	3–1	Toronto Maple Leafs (1978–79)	25–23–11

March

Game	Result	Date	Score	Opponent	Record
60	T	March 1, 1979	5–5	Minnesota North Stars (1978–79)	25–23–12
61	T	March 3, 1979	2–2	@ New York Rangers (1978–79)	25–23–13
62	L	March 4, 1979	1–6	Philadelphia Flyers (1978–79)	25–24–13
63	W	March 6, 1979	3–2	@ New York Islanders (1978–79)	26–24–13
64	W	March 8, 1979	6–4	Los Angeles Kings (1978–79)	27–24–13
65	T	March 10, 1979	5–5	@ Atlanta Flames (1978–79)	27–24–14
66	W	March 11, 1979	9–4	Atlanta Flames (1978–79)	28–24–14
67	W	March 14, 1979	4–1	@ Toronto Maple Leafs (1978–79)	29–24–14
68	W	March 15, 1979	4–2	Vancouver Canucks (1978–79)	30–24–14
69	L	March 17, 1979	3–5	@ Philadelphia Flyers (1978–79)	30–25–14
70	T	March 18, 1979	3–3	Washington Capitals (1978–79)	30–25–15
71	W	March 21, 1979	3–2	@ Colorado Rockies (1978–79)	31–25–15
72	W	March 23, 1979	4–3	@ Vancouver Canucks (1978–79)	32–25–15
73	W	March 24, 1979	3–2	@ Los Angeles Kings (1978–79)	33–25–15
74	W	March 26, 1979	4–2	@ St. Louis Blues (1978–79)	34–25–15
75	W	March 28, 1979	9–2	Boston Bruins (1978–79)	35–25–15
76	L	March 31, 1979	0–2	@ New York Islanders (1978–79)	35–26–15

April

Game	Result	Date	Score	Opponent	Record
77	L	April 1, 1979	3–6	Toronto Maple Leafs (1978–79)	35–27–15
78	W	April 5, 1979	9–3	@ Boston Bruins (1978–79)	36–27–15
79	L	April 7, 1979	2–6	@ Toronto Maple Leafs (1978–79)	36–28–15
80	T	April 8, 1979	5–5	Colorado Rockies (1978–79)	36–28–16

Legend: Win (2 points) Loss (0 points) Tie (1 point)

== Draft picks ==
Buffalo's draft picks at the 1978 NHL amateur draft held at the Queen Elizabeth Hotel in Montreal.

Round	#	Player	Nationality	College/Junior/Club team (League)
1	13	Larry Playfair	Canada	Portland Winterhawks (WCHL)
2	32	Tony McKegney	Canada	Kingston Canadians (OMJHL)
3	49	Rob McClanahan	United States	University of Minnesota (WCHA)
4	66	Mike Gazdic	Canada	Sudbury Wolves (OMJHL)
5	82	Randy Ireland	Canada	Flint Generals (IHL)
6	99	Cam MacGregor	Canada	Cornwall Royals (QMJHL)
7	116	Dan Eastman	Canada	Peterborough Petes (OMJHL)
8	133	Eric Strobel	United States	University of Minnesota (WCHA)
9	150	Eugene O'Sullivan	Canada	Calgary Wranglers (WCHL)

== See also ==
- 1978–79 NHL season
