= 1978–79 Minnesota North Stars season =

National Hockey League team season

1978–79 Minnesota North Stars
- Division: 4th Adams
- Conference: 7th Wales
- 1978–79 record: 28–40–12
- Home record: 19–15–6
- Road record: 9–25–6
- Goals for: 257
- Goals against: 289

Team information
- General manager: Lou Nanne
- Coach: Harry Howell (3–6–2); Glen Sonmor (25–34–10)
- Captain: J. P. Parise
- Alternate captains: None
- Arena: Met Center

Team leaders
- Goals: Bobby Smith (30)
- Assists: Bobby Smith (44)
- Points: Bobby Smith (74)
- Penalty minutes: Greg Smith (147)
- Plus/minus: Ron Zanussi (+5)
- Wins: Gilles Meloche (20)
- Goals against average: Gilles Meloche (3.30)

The 1978–79 Minnesota North Stars season was the team's 12th season in the NHL. In the off season, the North Stars were on the verge of folding, and were merged with the Cleveland Barons, another team on the brink of collapse. The merged franchise continued as the Minnesota North Stars, with the old logo and colors. The changes for the franchise were new ownership and new management. Former Cleveland Barons General Manager Harry Howell assumed the coaching duties from Lou Nanne, who was named general manager. Former Barons owner George Gund III became a co-owner of the North Stars. Howell's tenure as head coach would last just eleven games before he was replaced by Glen Sonmor.

While the merger allowed the North Stars to ice a stronger team, it also saw the North Stars take the Barons' place in the tough Adams Division. The North Stars finished with 68 points, which was a substantial improvement over either the Barons' or North Stars' performance the previous season. Had the North Stars still been in the Smythe Division, that would have been good enough for second place and a playoff berth, but it was not enough to lift the team out of last place in the Adams. Minnesota missed the playoffs for the 5th time in 6 years. One of the highlights was Bobby Smith winning the Calder Trophy.

== Offseason ==
=== NHL draft ===
Round	#	Player	Position	Nationality	College/junior/club team (League)
1	1	Bobby Smith	Center	Canada	Ottawa 67's (OMJHL)
2	19	Steve Payne	Left wing	Canada	Ottawa 67's (OMJHL)
2	24	Steve Christoff	Center	United States	University of Minnesota (WCHA)
4	54	Curt Giles	Defense	Canada	University of Minnesota-Duluth (WCHA)
5	70	Roy Kerling	Left wing	Canada	Cornell University (ECAC)
6	87	Bob Bergloff	Defense	United States	University of Minnesota (WCHA)
7	104	Kim Spencer	Defense	Canada	Victoria Cougars (WCHL)
8	121	Mike Cotter	Defense	Canada	Bowling Green University (CCHA)
9	138	Brent Gogol	Right wing	Canada	Billings Bighorns (WCHL)
10	155	Mike Seide	Left wing	United States	Bloomington Junior Stars (USHL)

== Regular season ==
=== Final standings ===
Adams Division
	GP	W	L	T	GF	GA	Pts
**Boston Bruins**	80	43	23	14	316	270	100
**Buffalo Sabres**	80	36	28	16	280	263	88
**Toronto Maple Leafs**	80	34	33	13	267	252	81
Minnesota North Stars	80	28	40	12	257	289	68

Note: W = Wins, L = Losses, T = Ties, GF = Goals For, GA = Goals Against, Pts = Points
Teams that qualified for the playoffs are highlighted in bold.

=== Record vs. opponents ===
Adams Division record vs. opponents

**Vs. Wales Conference**

**Vs. Campbell Conference**

**Vs. Adams Division**

1978–79 NHL records
Team	**BOS**	**BUF**	**MIN**	**TOR**	**Total**
Boston	—	4−3−1	5−0−3	5−1−2	**14−4−6**
Buffalo	3−4−1	—	5−2−1	4−3−1	**12−9−3**
Minnesota	0−5−3	2−5−1	—	2−4−2	**4−14−6**
Toronto	1−5−2	3−4−1	4−2−2	—	**8−11−5**

**Vs. Norris Division**

1978–79 NHL records
Team	**DET**	**LAK**	**MTL**	**PIT**	**WSH**	**Total**
Boston	3−1	1−3	0−2−2	1−2−1	3−0−1	**8−8−4**
Buffalo	3−1	2−1−1	0−4	0−2−2	3−0−1	**8−8−4**
Minnesota	2−1−1	1−3	1−3	1−3	2−2	**7−12−1**
Toronto	2−2	4−0	0−3−1	3−1	1−1−2	**10−7−3**

**Vs. Patrick Division**

1978–79 NHL records
Team	**ATL**	**NYI**	**NYR**	**PHI**	**Total**
Boston	3−1	1−2−2	3−2	1−3−1	**8−8−3**
Buffalo	2−2−1	2−1−1	1−2−1	0−3−2	**5−8−5**
Minnesota	2−1−1	1−3	2−1−1	2−2	**7−7−2**
Toronto	1−4	1−3	2−2−1	2−2−1	**6−11−2**

**Vs. Smythe Division**

1978–79 NHL records
Team	**CHI**	**COL**	**STL**	**VAN**	**Total**
Boston	3−1−1	3−1	3−1	4−0	**13−3−1**
Buffalo	2−2−1	3−0−1	3−0−1	3−1−1	**11−3−4**
Minnesota	2−2	2−3−1	2−1−1	4−1−1	**10−7−3**
Toronto	1−2−1	2−1−1	4−0	3−1−1	**10−4−3**

== Schedule and results ==
1978–79 regular season
October

Game	Result	Date	Score	Opponent	Record
1	L	October 11, 1978	2–5	@ Montreal Canadiens (1978–79)	0–1–0
2	L	October 14, 1978	2–5	Buffalo Sabres (1978–79)	0–2–0
3	W	October 18, 1978	7–2	Vancouver Canucks (1978–79)	1–2–0
4	L	October 19, 1978	2–6	@ Chicago Black Hawks (1978–79)	1–3–0
5	T	October 21, 1978	4–4	@ Detroit Red Wings (1978–79)	1–3–1
6	T	October 25, 1978	2–2	Boston Bruins (1978–79)	1–3–2
7	L	October 28, 1978	0–1	Colorado Rockies (1978–79)	1–4–2

November

Game	Result	Date	Score	Opponent	Record
8	W	November 1, 1978	9–1	St. Louis Blues (1978–79)	2–4–2
9	W	November 4, 1978	2–1	Buffalo Sabres (1978–79)	3–4–2
10	L	November 5, 1978	1–2	@ Buffalo Sabres (1978–79)	3–5–2
11	L	November 7, 1978	2–5	@ New York Islanders (1978–79)	3–6–2
12	W	November 8, 1978	5–3	@ New York Rangers (1978–79)	4–6–2
13	W	November 10, 1978	3–2	@ Vancouver Canucks (1978–79)	5–6–2
14	L	November 11, 1978	1–8	@ Los Angeles Kings (1978–79)	5–7–2
15	L	November 15, 1978	2–3	Washington Capitals (1978–79)	5–8–2
16	L	November 18, 1978	2–7	New York Rangers (1978–79)	5–9–2
17	L	November 19, 1978	2–9	@ Buffalo Sabres (1978–79)	5–10–2
18	L	November 22, 1978	1–4	New York Islanders (1978–79)	5–11–2
19	L	November 24, 1978	3–4	@ Philadelphia Flyers (1978–79)	5–12–2
20	L	November 25, 1978	1–4	Los Angeles Kings (1978–79)	5–13–2
21	L	November 29, 1978	3–5	Toronto Maple Leafs (1978–79)	5–14–2

December

Game	Result	Date	Score	Opponent	Record
22	W	December 1, 1978	4–3	@ Atlanta Flames (1978–79)	6–14–2
23	W	December 2, 1978	5–3	Atlanta Flames (1978–79)	7–14–2
24	W	December 6, 1978	4–0	Los Angeles Kings (1978–79)	8–14–2
25	W	December 9, 1978	3–0	Colorado Rockies (1978–79)	9–14–2
26	T	December 10, 1978	4–4	@ Boston Bruins (1978–79)	9–14–3
27	L	December 13, 1978	2–3	Montreal Canadiens (1978–79)	9–15–3
28	W	December 15, 1978	6–1	@ Washington Capitals (1978–79)	10–15–3
29	L	December 16, 1978	2–5	Buffalo Sabres (1978–79)	10–16–3
30	W	December 19, 1978	5–3	Vancouver Canucks (1978–79)	11–16–3
31	L	December 20, 1978	2–4	@ Toronto Maple Leafs (1978–79)	11–17–3
32	W	December 23, 1978	5–3	Pittsburgh Penguins (1978–79)	12–17–3
33	W	December 26, 1978	6–4	@ St. Louis Blues (1978–79)	13–17–3
34	W	December 27, 1978	6–1	Washington Capitals (1978–79)	14–17–3
35	L	December 30, 1978	2–7	@ Colorado Rockies (1978–79)	14–18–3

January

Game	Result	Date	Score	Opponent	Record
36	T	January 3, 1979	3–3	St. Louis Blues (1978–79)	14–18–4
37	L	January 6, 1979	2–5	Boston Bruins (1978–79)	14–19–4
38	L	January 8, 1979	1–3	@ Montreal Canadiens (1978–79)	14–20–4
39	T	January 10, 1979	2–2	@ Toronto Maple Leafs (1978–79)	14–20–5
40	L	January 11, 1979	4–6	@ Boston Bruins (1978–79)	14–21–5
41	W	January 13, 1979	4–3	Chicago Black Hawks (1978–79)	15–21–5
42	W	January 15, 1979	8–1	@ New York Rangers (1978–79)	16–21–5
43	L	January 16, 1979	0–5	@ Pittsburgh Penguins (1978–79)	16–22–5
44	L	January 19, 1979	3–5	@ Colorado Rockies (1978–79)	16–23–5
45	T	January 20, 1979	3–3	Colorado Rockies (1978–79)	16–23–6
46	T	January 24, 1979	2–2	Toronto Maple Leafs (1978–79)	16–23–7
47	W	January 27, 1979	3–1	Philadelphia Flyers (1978–79)	17–23–7
48	W	January 28, 1979	3–1	@ Buffalo Sabres (1978–79)	18–23–7
49	W	January 30, 1979	5–4	@ New York Islanders (1978–79)	19–23–7

February

Game	Result	Date	Score	Opponent	Record
50	W	February 1, 1979	6–1	Detroit Red Wings (1978–79)	20–23–7
51	L	February 3, 1979	1–2	Buffalo Sabres (1978–79)	20–24–7
52	W	February 4, 1979	6–4	Toronto Maple Leafs (1978–79)	21–24–7
53	W	February 14, 1979	8–1	Vancouver Canucks (1978–79)	22–24–7
54	L	February 15, 1979	5–6	@ Pittsburgh Penguins (1978–79)	22–25–7
55	T	February 17, 1979	3–3	Boston Bruins (1978–79)	22–25–8
56	L	February 18, 1979	2–3	@ Philadelphia Flyers (1978–79)	22–26–8
57	W	February 21, 1979	5–1	Toronto Maple Leafs (1978–79)	23–26–8
58	T	February 23, 1979	2–2	@ Atlanta Flames (1978–79)	23–26–9
59	L	February 24, 1979	3–6	Atlanta Flames (1978–79)	23–27–9
60	T	February 28, 1979	4–4	New York Rangers (1978–79)	23–27–10

March

Game	Result	Date	Score	Opponent	Record
61	T	March 1, 1979	5–5	@ Buffalo Sabres (1978–79)	23–27–11
62	L	March 3, 1979	0–5	@ Boston Bruins (1978–79)	23–28–11
63	L	March 4, 1979	4–5	@ Washington Capitals (1978–79)	23–29–11
64	W	March 7, 1979	5–1	Detroit Red Wings (1978–79)	24–29–11
65	L	March 10, 1979	3–4	Boston Bruins (1978–79)	24–30–11
66	L	March 11, 1979	2–8	@ St. Louis Blues (1978–79)	24–31–11
67	W	March 14, 1979	4–3	Montreal Canadiens (1978–79)	25–31–11
68	L	March 17, 1979	4–6	@ Toronto Maple Leafs (1978–79)	25–32–11
69	L	March 18, 1979	3–5	New York Islanders (1978–79)	25–33–11
70	W	March 21, 1979	7–3	Philadelphia Flyers (1978–79)	26–33–11
71	W	March 24, 1979	3–1	@ Colorado Rockies (1978–79)	27–33–11
72	L	March 25, 1979	1–2	@ Vancouver Canucks (1978–79)	27–34–11
73	L	March 27, 1979	1–5	Pittsburgh Penguins (1978–79)	27–35–11
74	L	March 29, 1979	4–7	@ Boston Bruins (1978–79)	27–36–11
75	L	March 31, 1979	2–6	@ Toronto Maple Leafs (1978–79)	27–37–11

April

Game	Result	Date	Score	Opponent	Record
76	L	April 1, 1979	1–3	@ Detroit Red Wings (1978–79)	27–38–11
77	W	April 3, 1979	4–3	Chicago Black Hawks (1978–79)	28–38–11
78	L	April 4, 1979	1–7	@ Chicago Black Hawks (1978–79)	28–39–11
79	T	April 6, 1979	2–2	@ Vancouver Canucks (1978–79)	28–39–12
80	L	April 7, 1979	1–7	@ Los Angeles Kings (1978–79)	28–40–12

Legend: Win (2 points) Loss (0 points) Tie (1 point)

== Player statistics ==
=== Skaters ===
Note: GP = Games played; G = Goals; A = Assists; Pts = Points; +/- = Plus/minus; PIM = Penalty minutes

Player	GP	G	A	Pts	+/-	PIM
Bobby Smith	80	30	44	74	-8	39

=== Goaltenders ===
Note: GP = Games played; TOI = Time on ice (minutes); W = Wins; L = Losses; OT = Overtime losses; GA = Goals against; SO = Shutouts; SV% = Save percentage; GAA = Goals against average

Player	GP	TOI	W	L	OT	GA	SO	SV%	GAA
