= 1978–79 Los Angeles Kings season =

National Hockey League team season

1978–79 Los Angeles Kings
- Division: 3rd Norris
- Conference: 6th Wales
- 1978–79 record: 34–34–12
- Home record: 20–13–7
- Road record: 14–21–5
- Goals for: 292
- Goals against: 286

Team information
- General manager: George Maguire
- Coach: Bob Berry
- Captain: Mike Murphy
- Alternate captains: None
- Arena: Los Angeles Forum

Team leaders
- Goals: Marcel Dionne (59)
- Assists: Marcel Dionne (71)
- Points: Marcel Dionne (130)
- Penalty minutes: Randy Holt (202)
- Wins: Mario Lessard (23)
- Goals against average: Mario Lessard (3.11)

The 1978–79 Los Angeles Kings season was the Kings' 12th season in the National Hockey League (NHL).

== Regular season ==
=== Final standings ===
Norris Division
| | GP | W | L | T | GF | GA | Pts |
|---|---|---|---|---|---|---|---|
| **Montreal Canadiens** | 80 | 52 | 17 | 11 | 337 | 204 | 115 |
| **Pittsburgh Penguins** | 80 | 36 | 31 | 13 | 281 | 279 | 85 |
| **Los Angeles Kings** | 80 | 34 | 34 | 12 | 292 | 286 | 80 |
| Washington Capitals | 80 | 24 | 41 | 15 | 273 | 338 | 63 |
| Detroit Red Wings | 80 | 23 | 41 | 16 | 252 | 295 | 62 |

Note: W = Wins, L = Losses, T = Ties, GF = Goals For, GA = Goals Against, Pts = Points
Teams that qualified for the playoffs are highlighted in bold.

=== Record vs. opponents ===
Norris Division record vs. opponents

**Vs. Wales Conference**

**Vs. Campbell Conference**

**Vs. Norris Division**

1978–79 NHL records
| Team | **DET** | **LAK** | **MTL** | **PIT** | **WSH** | **Total** |
|---|---|---|---|---|---|---|
| Detroit | — | 1–5–2 | 2–4–2 | 3–5 | 3–2–3 | **9–16–7** |
| Los Angeles | 5–1–2 | — | 3–3–2 | 3–4–1 | 3–4–1 | **14–12–6** |
| Montreal | 4–2–2 | 3–3–2 | — | 5–2–1 | 7–0–1 | **19–7–6** |
| Pittsburgh | 5–3 | 4–3–1 | 2–5–1 | — | 4–3–1 | **15–14–3** |
| Washington | 2–3–3 | 4–3–1 | 0–7–1 | 3–4–1 | — | **9–17–6** |

**Vs. Adams Division**

1978–79 NHL records
| Team | **BOS** | **BUF** | **MIN** | **TOR** | **Total** |
|---|---|---|---|---|---|
| Detroit | 1–3 | 1–3 | 1–2–1 | 2–2 | **5–10–1** |
| Los Angeles | 3–1 | 1–2–1 | 3–1 | 0–4 | **7–8–1** |
| Montreal | 2–0–2 | 4–0 | 3–1 | 3–0–1 | **12–1–3** |
| Pittsburgh | 2–1–1 | 2–0–2 | 3–1 | 1–3 | **8–5–3** |
| Washington | 0–3–1 | 0–3–1 | 2–2 | 1–1–2 | **3–9–4** |

**Vs. Patrick Division**

1978–79 NHL records
| Team | **ATL** | **NYI** | **NYR** | **PHI** | **Total** |
|---|---|---|---|---|---|
| Detroit | 0–3–1 | 0–3–1 | 1–1–2 | 0–2–2 | **1–9–6** |
| Los Angeles | 2–2 | 0–2–2 | 1–3 | 0–4 | **3–11–2** |
| Montreal | 3–1 | 1–3 | 1–3 | 3–0–1 | **8–7–1** |
| Pittsburgh | 0–3–1 | 0–1–3 | 2–2 | 1–3 | **3–9–4** |
| Washington | 1–2–1 | 1–3 | 1–1–2 | 0–3–1 | **3–9–4** |

**Vs. Smythe Division**

1978–79 NHL records
| Team | **CHI** | **COL** | **STL** | **VAN** | **Total** |
|---|---|---|---|---|---|
| Detroit | 3–0–1 | 3–0–1 | 1–3 | 1–3 | **8–6–2** |
| Los Angeles | 3–1 | 2–0–2 | 2–1–1 | 3–1 | **10–3–3** |
| Montreal | 2–2 | 4–0 | 4–0 | 3–0–1 | **13–2–1** |
| Pittsburgh | 2–0–2 | 3–1 | 2–1–1 | 3–1 | **10–3–3** |
| Washington | 1–2–1 | 3–1 | 2–2 | 3–1 | **9–6–1** |

== Schedule and results ==
1978–79 regular season
October

| Game | Result | Date | Score | Opponent | Record |
|---|---|---|---|---|---|
| 1 | L | October 11, 1978 | 2–4 | Washington Capitals (1978–79) | 0–1–0 |
| 2 | W | October 14, 1978 | 6–2 | St. Louis Blues (1978–79) | 1–1–0 |
| 3 | L | October 18, 1978 | 2–3 | Boston Bruins (1978–79) | 1–2–0 |
| 4 | W | October 20, 1978 | 6–4 | @ Washington Capitals (1978–79) | 2–2–0 |
| 5 | L | October 22, 1978 | 4–8 | @ Montreal Canadiens (1978–79) | 2–3–0 |
| 6 | L | October 24, 1978 | 2–7 | @ Atlanta Flames (1978–79) | 2–4–0 |
| 7 | W | October 26, 1978 | 6–0 | Buffalo Sabres (1978–79) | 3–4–0 |
| 8 | W | October 28, 1978 | 5–1 | Washington Capitals (1978–79) | 4–4–0 |

November

| Game | Result | Date | Score | Opponent | Record |
|---|---|---|---|---|---|
| 9 | L | November 1, 1978 | 2–4 | Toronto Maple Leafs (1978–79) | 4–5–0 |
| 10 | L | November 4, 1978 | 3–7 | New York Rangers (1978–79) | 4–6–0 |
| 11 | L | November 8, 1978 | 3–5 | Philadelphia Flyers (1978–79) | 4–7–0 |
| 12 | W | November 11, 1978 | 8–1 | Minnesota North Stars (1978–79) | 5–7–0 |
| 13 | W | November 12, 1978 | 4–1 | @ Chicago Black Hawks (1978–79) | 6–7–0 |
| 14 | W | November 14, 1978 | 4–2 | @ St. Louis Blues (1978–79) | 7–7–0 |
| 15 | W | November 16, 1978 | 6–3 | Montreal Canadiens (1978–79) | 8–7–0 |
| 16 | L | November 18, 1978 | 1–3 | Pittsburgh Penguins (1978–79) | 8–8–0 |
| 17 | W | November 20, 1978 | 4–3 | Chicago Black Hawks (1978–79) | 9–8–0 |
| 18 | T | November 22, 1978 | 3–3 | Detroit Red Wings (1978–79) | 9–8–1 |
| 19 | W | November 25, 1978 | 4–1 | @ Minnesota North Stars (1978–79) | 10–8–1 |
| 20 | L | November 26, 1978 | 2–4 | @ Detroit Red Wings (1978–79) | 10–9–1 |
| 21 | T | November 29, 1978 | 5–5 | New York Islanders (1978–79) | 10–9–2 |

December

| Game | Result | Date | Score | Opponent | Record |
|---|---|---|---|---|---|
| 22 | W | December 2, 1978 | 5–2 | Detroit Red Wings (1978–79) | 11–9–2 |
| 23 | W | December 4, 1978 | 10–2 | Washington Capitals (1978–79) | 12–9–2 |
| 24 | L | December 6, 1978 | 0–4 | @ Minnesota North Stars (1978–79) | 12–10–2 |
| 25 | T | December 7, 1978 | 3–3 | @ Buffalo Sabres (1978–79) | 12–10–3 |
| 26 | W | December 9, 1978 | 5–1 | Atlanta Flames (1978–79) | 13–10–3 |
| 27 | T | December 12, 1978 | 5–5 | @ New York Islanders (1978–79) | 13–10–4 |
| 28 | L | December 13, 1978 | 7–8 | @ New York Rangers (1978–79) | 13–11–4 |
| 29 | L | December 16, 1978 | 2–5 | Montreal Canadiens (1978–79) | 13–12–4 |
| 30 | T | December 19, 1978 | 2–2 | @ Colorado Rockies (1978–79) | 13–12–5 |
| 31 | L | December 21, 1978 | 1–4 | Pittsburgh Penguins (1978–79) | 13–13–5 |
| 32 | L | December 23, 1978 | 0–2 | @ Vancouver Canucks (1978–79) | 13–14–5 |
| 33 | L | December 27, 1978 | 2–5 | @ Pittsburgh Penguins (1978–79) | 13–15–5 |
| 34 | T | December 28, 1978 | 3–3 | @ Montreal Canadiens (1978–79) | 13–15–6 |
| 35 | W | December 30, 1978 | 4–0 | Vancouver Canucks (1978–79) | 14–15–6 |

January

| Game | Result | Date | Score | Opponent | Record |
|---|---|---|---|---|---|
| 36 | W | January 1, 1979 | 5–3 | Colorado Rockies (1978–79) | 15–15–6 |
| 37 | L | January 3, 1979 | 3–8 | @ Washington Capitals (1978–79) | 15–16–6 |
| 38 | W | January 4, 1979 | 5–4 | @ Montreal Canadiens (1978–79) | 16–16–6 |
| 39 | W | January 6, 1979 | 4–3 | @ Pittsburgh Penguins (1978–79) | 17–16–6 |
| 40 | L | January 7, 1979 | 0–3 | @ Philadelphia Flyers (1978–79) | 17–17–6 |
| 41 | L | January 9, 1979 | 1–7 | @ New York Islanders (1978–79) | 17–18–6 |
| 42 | L | January 10, 1979 | 0–3 | @ Chicago Black Hawks (1978–79) | 17–19–6 |
| 43 | W | January 13, 1979 | 7–3 | @ Detroit Red Wings (1978–79) | 18–19–6 |
| 44 | W | January 14, 1979 | 6–3 | @ Boston Bruins (1978–79) | 19–19–6 |
| 45 | L | January 17, 1979 | 3–7 | Montreal Canadiens (1978–79) | 19–20–6 |
| 46 | L | January 20, 1979 | 2–3 | Toronto Maple Leafs (1978–79) | 19–21–6 |
| 47 | W | January 24, 1979 | 4–1 | Pittsburgh Penguins (1978–79) | 20–21–6 |
| 48 | T | January 25, 1979 | 6–6 | Detroit Red Wings (1978–79) | 20–21–7 |
| 49 | L | January 27, 1979 | 3–5 | @ Pittsburgh Penguins (1978–79) | 20–22–7 |
| 50 | W | January 28, 1979 | 5–3 | @ Boston Bruins (1978–79) | 21–22–7 |
| 51 | L | January 30, 1979 | 1–7 | @ St. Louis Blues (1978–79) | 21–23–7 |
| 52 | L | January 31, 1979 | 3–5 | @ Washington Capitals (1978–79) | 21–24–7 |

February

| Game | Result | Date | Score | Opponent | Record |
|---|---|---|---|---|---|
| 53 | W | February 3, 1979 | 4–2 | New York Rangers (1978–79) | 22–24–7 |
| 54 | W | February 4, 1979 | 4–1 | @ Colorado Rockies (1978–79) | 23–24–7 |
| 55 | W | February 14, 1979 | 3–2 | @ Detroit Red Wings (1978–79) | 24–24–7 |
| 56 | T | February 15, 1979 | 2–2 | @ Montreal Canadiens (1978–79) | 24–24–8 |
| 57 | L | February 17, 1979 | 2–5 | @ Toronto Maple Leafs (1978–79) | 24–25–8 |
| 58 | L | February 19, 1979 | 3–8 | New York Islanders (1978–79) | 24–26–8 |
| 59 | W | February 21, 1979 | 3–1 | Boston Bruins (1978–79) | 25–26–8 |
| 60 | L | February 24, 1979 | 3–4 | Philadelphia Flyers (1978–79) | 25–27–8 |
| 61 | W | February 26, 1979 | 2–0 | Vancouver Canucks (1978–79) | 26–27–8 |
| 62 | T | February 28, 1979 | 3–3 | Washington Capitals (1978–79) | 26–27–9 |

March

| Game | Result | Date | Score | Opponent | Record |
|---|---|---|---|---|---|
| 63 | W | March 3, 1979 | 8–5 | Chicago Black Hawks (1978–79) | 27–27–9 |
| 64 | W | March 4, 1979 | 3–2 | @ Vancouver Canucks (1978–79) | 28–27–9 |
| 65 | W | March 7, 1979 | 4–0 | @ Pittsburgh Penguins (1978–79) | 29–27–9 |
| 66 | L | March 8, 1979 | 4–6 | @ Buffalo Sabres (1978–79) | 29–28–9 |
| 67 | L | March 10, 1979 | 4–9 | @ Toronto Maple Leafs (1978–79) | 29–29–9 |
| 68 | L | March 11, 1979 | 3–6 | @ Philadelphia Flyers (1978–79) | 29–30–9 |
| 69 | T | March 14, 1979 | 3–3 | Pittsburgh Penguins (1978–79) | 29–30–10 |
| 70 | W | March 17, 1979 | 3–1 | Montreal Canadiens (1978–79) | 30–30–10 |
| 71 | W | March 20, 1979 | 4–3 | Atlanta Flames (1978–79) | 31–30–10 |
| 72 | T | March 22, 1979 | 3–3 | St. Louis Blues (1978–79) | 31–30–11 |
| 73 | L | March 24, 1979 | 2–3 | Buffalo Sabres (1978–79) | 31–31–11 |
| 74 | W | March 28, 1979 | 8–1 | Detroit Red Wings (1978–79) | 32–31–11 |
| 75 | L | March 30, 1979 | 3–5 | @ Atlanta Flames (1978–79) | 32–32–11 |
| 76 | W | March 31, 1979 | 5–4 | @ Detroit Red Wings (1978–79) | 33–32–11 |

April

| Game | Result | Date | Score | Opponent | Record |
|---|---|---|---|---|---|
| 77 | L | April 2, 1979 | 4–5 | @ New York Rangers (1978–79) | 33–33–11 |
| 78 | L | April 3, 1979 | 2–6 | @ Washington Capitals (1978–79) | 33–34–11 |
| 79 | T | April 5, 1979 | 4–4 | Colorado Rockies (1978–79) | 33–34–12 |
| 80 | W | April 7, 1979 | 7–1 | Minnesota North Stars (1978–79) | 34–34–12 |

Legend: Win (2 points) Loss (0 points) Tie (1 point)

== Transactions ==
The Kings were involved in the following transactions during the 1978–79 season.

=== Trades ===
| June 14, 1978 | To Los Angeles Kings Brian Glennie; Kurt Walker; Scott Garland; 2nd round pick in 1979 – Mark Hardy | To Toronto Maple Leafs Dave Hutchison; Lorne Stamler |
| June 15, 1978 | To Los Angeles Kings Cash | To St. Louis Blues 13th round pick in 1978 – Terry Kitching; 14th round pick in 1978 – Jim Farrell |
| September 18, 1978 | To Los Angeles Kings Doug Halward | To Boston Bruins Future considerations |
| October 5, 1978 | To Los Angeles Kings Murray Wilson; 1st round pick in 1979 – Jay Wells | To Montreal Canadiens 1st round pick in 1981 – Gilbert Delorme |
| October 9, 1978 | To Los Angeles Kings Ron Grahame | To Boston Bruins 1st round pick in 1979 – Ray Bourque |
| November 18, 1978 | To Los Angeles Kings 4th round pick in 1982 – Dave Gans | To Colorado Rockies Nick Beverley |
| December 6, 1978 | To Los Angeles Kings Steve Carlson | To Detroit Red Wings Steve Short |
| December 31, 1978 | To Los Angeles Kings Randy Holt | To Vancouver Canucks Don Kozak |
| January 16, 1979 | To Los Angeles Kings Richard Mulhern; 2nd round pick in 1980 – Dave Morrison | To Atlanta Flames Bob Murdoch; 2nd round pick in 1980 – Tony Curtale |

=== Free agent signings ===
| June 14, 1978 | From New York Rangers Mark Heaslip |
| August 7, 1978 | From Fort Wayne Komets (IHL) Dan Bonar |

=== Free agents lost ===
| June 30, 1978 | To Minnesota North Stars Gary Sargent |
| August 8, 1978 | To Detroit Red Wings Rogie Vachon (5 years, $1.9 million) |

=== Free agent compensation ===
Dale McCourt refused to report to Los Angeles and sued the NHL. He played the 1978–79 season with the Red Wings.

| July 15, 1978 | To Los Angeles Kings Dave Gardner; Rick Hampton; Steve Jensen | To Minnesota North Stars Gary Sargent |
| August 22, 1978 | To Los Angeles Kings Dale McCourt | To Detroit Red Wings Rogie Vachon |

=== Waivers ===
| September 5, 1978 | From Minnesota North Stars Nick Beverley |

== Draft picks ==
Los Angeles's draft picks at the 1978 NHL amateur draft held at the Queen Elizabeth Hotel in Montreal.

| Round | # | Player | Nationality | College/Junior/Club team (League) |
|---|---|---|---|---|
| 5 | 77 | Paul Mancini | Canada | Sault Ste. Marie Greyhounds (OMJHL) |
| 6 | 94 | Doug Keans | Canada | Oshawa Generals (OMJHL) |
| 7 | 111 | Don Waddell | United States | Northern Michigan University (CCHA) |
| 8 | 128 | Rob Mierkalns | Canada | Hamilton Fincups (OMJHL) |
| 9 | 145 | Rick Scully | Canada | Brown University (ECAC) |
| 10 | 162 | Brad Thiessen | Canada | Toronto Marlboros (OMJHL) |
| 11 | 177 | Jim Armstrong | United States | Clarkson University (ECAC) |
| 12 | 193 | Claude Larochelle | Canada | Hull Olympiques (QMJHL) |

== See also ==
- 1978–79 NHL season
