= Trevor Johansen =

Canadian ice hockey player (born 1957)

- Born: March 30, 1957 (age 69) Thunder Bay, Ontario, Canada
- Height: 5 ft 9 in (175 cm)
- Weight: 201 lb (91 kg; 14 st 5 lb)
- Position: Defense
- Shot: Right
- Played for: Toronto Maple Leafs; Colorado Rockies; Los Angeles Kings
- NHL draft: 12th overall, 1977; Toronto Maple Leafs
- Playing career: 1977–1983

Trevor Daniel Johansen (born March 30, 1957) is a Canadian retired professional ice hockey player who played 286 games in the National Hockey League. Johansen was drafted with the 12th overall pick in the 1977 NHL entry draft by the Toronto Maple Leafs. In addition to the Maple Leafs, he also spent time with the Colorado Rockies, and Los Angeles Kings. He is the son of Bill Johansen, who played only one game in the NHL.

== Career statistics ==
=== Regular season and playoffs ===
			Regular season					Playoffs
Season	Team	League	GP	G	A	Pts	PIM	GP	G	A	Pts	PIM
1973–74	Thunder Bay Hurricanes	MWJHL	59	13	31	44	137	—	—	—	—	—
1974–75	Toronto Marlboros	OHL	50	9	30	39	175	22	2	8	10	48
1975–76	Toronto Marlboros	OMJHL	61	5	25	30	141	1	0	0	0	0
1976–77	Toronto Marlboros	OMJHL	61	2	34	36	177	—	—	—	—	—
1977–78	Toronto Maple Leafs	NHL	79	2	14	16	82	13	0	3	3	21
1978–79	Toronto Maple Leafs	NHL	40	1	4	5	48	—	—	—	—	—
1978–79	New Brunswick Hawks	AHL	24	1	7	8	49	—	—	—	—	—
1978–79	Colorado Rockies	NHL	11	1	3	4	16	—	—	—	—	—
1979–80	Colorado Rockies	NHL	62	3	8	11	45	—	—	—	—	—
1980–81	Colorado Rockies	NHL	35	0	7	7	18	—	—	—	—	—
1981–82	Los Angeles Kings	NHL	46	3	7	10	69	—	—	—	—	—
1981–82	Toronto Maple Leafs	NHL	13	1	3	4	4	—	—	—	—	—
1982–83	Springfield Indians	AHL	6	0	0	0	16	—	—	—	—	—
NHL totals			286	11	46	57	282	13	0	3	3	21

Preceded by John Anderson	Toronto Maple Leafs first-round draft pick 1977	Succeeded by Laurie Boschman
