= List of Colorado Rockies (NHL) draft picks =

This is a complete list of ice hockey players who were drafted in the National Hockey League Entry Draft by the Colorado Rockies franchise. It includes every player whom the team drafted in the five drafts they took part in, from 1977 to 1981, regardless of whether they played for the team.

== Key ==
# Played at least one game with the Rockies
↑ Spent entire NHL career with the Rockies

General terms and abbreviations
Term or abbreviation	Definition
Draft	The year that the player was selected
Round	The round of the draft in which the player was selected
Pick	The overall position in the draft at which the player was selected

Position abbreviations
Abbreviation	Definition
G	Goaltender
D	Defense
LW	Left wing
C	Center
RW	Right wing
F	Forward

Abbreviations for statistical columns
Abbreviation	Definition
Pos	Position
GP	Games played
G	Goals
A	Assists
Pts	Points
PIM	Penalties in minutes
W	Wins
L	Losses
T	Ties
GAA	Goals against average
—	Does not apply

== Draft picks ==
Draft	Round	Pick	Player	Nationality	Pos	GP	G	A	Pts	PIM	W	L	T	GAA
1977	1	2	Barry Beck#	Canada	D	615	104	251	355	1016	—	—	—	—
1977	3	38	Doug Berry↑	Canada	C	121	10	33	43	24	—	—	—	—
1977	3	47	Randy Pierce#	Canada	RW	277	62	76	138	223	—	—	—	—
1977	5	74	Mike Dwyer#	Canada	LW	31	2	6	8	25	—	—	—	—
1977	6	92	Dan Lempe	United States	F	—	—	—	—	—	—	—	—	—
1977	7	110	Rick Doyle	Canada	C	—	—	—	—	—	—	—	—	—
1977	8	126	Joe Contini#	Canada	C	68	17	21	38	34	—	—	—	—
1977	9	142	Jack Hughes↑	United States	D	46	2	5	7	104	—	—	—	—
1978	1	5	Mike Gillis#	Canada	LW	246	33	43	76	186	—	—	—	—
1978	2	27	Merlin Malinowski#	Canada	F	282	54	111	165	121	—	—	—	—
1978	3	41	Paul Messier↑	Canada	C	9	0	0	0	4	—	—	—	—
1978	4	58	Dave Watson↑	Canada	F	18	0	1	1	10	—	—	—	—
1978	5	73	Tim Thomlison	Canada	G	—	—	—	—	—	—	—	—	—
1978	5	74	Rod Guimont	Canada	RW	—	—	—	—	—	—	—	—	—
1978	6	91	John Hynes	United States	G	—	—	—	—	—	—	—	—	—
1978	7	108	Andy Clark	Canada	D	—	—	—	—	—	—	—	—	—
1978	8	125	John Olver	Canada	RW	—	—	—	—	—	—	—	—	—
1978	9	142	Kevin Krook↑	Canada	D	3	0	0	0	2	—	—	—	—
1978	10	159	Jeff Jensen	United States	LW	—	—	—	—	—	—	—	—	—
1978	11	174	Bo Ericson	Sweden	D	—	—	—	—	—	—	—	—	—
1978	12	190	Jari Viitala	Finland	C	—	—	—	—	—	—	—	—	—
1978	13	204	Ulf Zetterstrom	Sweden	LW	—	—	—	—	—	—	—	—	—
1979	1	1	Rob Ramage#	Canada	D	1044	139	425	564	2224	—	—	—	—
1979	4	64	Steve Peters↑	Canada	F	2	0	1	1	0	—	—	—	—
1979	5	85	Gary Dillon↑	Canada	C	13	1	1	2	29	—	—	—	—
1979	6	106	Bob Attwell↑	United States	RW	22	1	5	6	0	—	—	—	—
1980	1	19	Paul Gagne#	Canada	F	390	110	102	212	127	—	—	—	—
1980	2	22	Joe Ward↑	United States	C	4	0	0	0	2	—	—	—	—
1980	4	64	Rick LaFerriere↑	Canada	G	1	0	0	0	0	0	0	0	3.00
1980	5	85	Ed Cooper↑	Canada	LW	49	8	7	15	46	—	—	—	—
1980	6	106	Aaron Broten#	United States	F	748	186	329	515	441	—	—	—	—
1980	6	127	Dan Fascinato	Canada	D	—	—	—	—	—	—	—	—	—
1980	8	148	Andre Hidi	Canada	F	7	2	1	3	9	—	—	—	—
1980	8	169	Shawn MacKenzie	Canada	G	6	0	0	0	0	0	1	0	6.92
1980	10	190	Bob Jansch	Canada	RW	—	—	—	—	—	—	—	—	—
1981	1	5	Joe Cirella#	Canada	D	828	64	211	275	1448	—	—	—	—
1981	2	26	Rich Chernomaz#	Canada	RW	51	9	7	16	18	—	—	—	—
1981	3	48	Uli Hiemer	Germany	D	143	19	54	73	176	—	—	—	—
1981	4	66	Gus Greco	Canada	LW	—	—	—	—	—	—	—	—	—
1981	5	87	Doug Speck	Canada	D	—	—	—	—	—	—	—	—	—
1981	6	108	Bruce Driver	Canada	D	922	96	390	486	670	—	—	—	—
1981	7	129	Jeff Larmer#	Canada	LW	158	37	51	88	57	—	—	—	—
1981	8	150	Tony Arima	Finland	F	—	—	—	—	—	—	—	—	—
1981	9	171	Tim Army	United States	F	—	—	—	—	—	—	—	—	—
1981	10	192	John Johannson	United States	F	5	0	0	0	0	—	—	—	—

== See also ==
- List of Colorado Rockies (NHL) players
- List of Kansas City Scouts draft picks
- List of New Jersey Devils draft picks
