= List of Colorado Rockies (NHL) players =

This is a list of players who played at least one game for the Colorado Rockies (1976–77 to 1981–82) of the National Hockey League (NHL). This list does not include players from the Kansas City Scouts (1974–75 to 1975–76) and New Jersey Devils (1982–83 to present).

== Key ==
- Hockey Hall of Famer

Abbreviations
C	Center
D	Defenseman
L	Left wing
R	Right wing

Goaltenders
W	Wins
L	Losses
T	Ties
SO	Shutouts
GAA	Goals against average
SV%	Save percentage

Skaters
GP	Games played
G	Goals
A	Assists
Pts	Points
PIM	Penalty minutes

The "Seasons" column lists the first year of the season of the player's first game and the last year of the season of the player's last game. For example, a player who played one game in the 2000–2001 season would be listed as playing with the team from 2000–2001, regardless of what calendar year the game occurred within.

== Skaters ==
				Regular season					Playoffs				
Player	Position	Seasons	GP	G	A	Pts	PIM	GP	G	A	Pts	PIM	Notes
Fred Ahern	R	1977–1978	38	5	13	18	19	2	0	1	1	2	
Ron Andruff	C	1976–1979	147	19	36	55	52	2	0	0	0	0	
Chuck Arnason	R	1976–1978	90	17	18	35	20	—	—	—	—	—	
Don Ashby	C	1978–1980	23	2	4	6	4	—	—	—	—	—	
Brent Ashton	L	1981–1982	80	24	36	60	26	—	—	—	—	—	
Bob Attwell	R	1979–1981	22	1	5	6	0	—	—	—	—	—	
Les Auge	D	1980–1981	6	0	3	3	4	—	—	—	—	—	
Don Awrey	D	1978–1979	56	1	4	5	18	—	—	—	—	—	
Bill Baker	D	1980–1982	27	0	6	6	29	—	—	—	—	—	
Barry Beck	D	1977–1980	148	37	71	108	188	2	0	1	1	0	
Doug Berry	C	1979–1981	121	10	33	43	25	—	—	—	—	—	
Nick Beverley	D	1978–1980	98	2	13	15	16	—	—	—	—	—	
Henry Boucha	C	1976–1977	9	0	2	2	4	—	—	—	—	—	
Aaron Broten	C	1980–1982	60	15	24	39	6	—	—	—	—	—	
Don Cairns	L	1976–1977	2	0	1	1	2	—	—	—	—	—	
Dave Cameron	C	1981–1982	66	11	12	23	103	—	—	—	—	—	
Colin Campbell	D	1976–1977	54	3	8	11	67	—	—	—	—	—	
Rich Chernomaz	R	1981–1982	2	0	0	0	0	—	—	—	—	—	
Mike Christie	D	1977–1981	178	4	35	39	194	2	0	0	0	0	
Joe Cirella	D	1981–1982	65	7	12	19	52	—	—	—	—	—	
Rey Comeau	C	1978–1980	92	10	15	25	22	—	—	—	—	—	
Joe Contini	C	1977–1979	67	17	21	38	34	2	0	0	0	0	
Ed Cooper	L	1980–1982	49	8	7	15	46	—	—	—	—	—	
Bobby Crawford	R	1980–1981	15	1	3	4	6	—	—	—	—	—	
Gary Croteau	R	1976–1980	234	65	71	136	60	—	—	—	—	—	
Barry Dean	L	1976–1977	79	14	25	39	92	—	—	—	—	—	
Lucien DeBlois	C	1979–1981	144	50	35	85	114	—	—	—	—	—	
Ron Delorme	C	1976–1981	314	66	63	129	284	2	0	0	0	10	
Guy Delparte	R	1976–1977	48	1	8	9	18	—	—	—	—	—	
Gary Dillon	C	1980–1981	13	1	1	2	29	—	—	—	—	—	
Jim Dobson	R	1981–1982	3	0	0	0	2	—	—	—	—	—	
Denis Dupere	L	1976–1978	111	22	26	48	8	2	1	0	1	0	
Steve Durbano	D	1976–1977	19	0	2	2	129	—	—	—	—	—	
Mike Dwyer	L	1978–1980	22	2	3	5	21	—	—	—	—	—	
Tom Edur	D	1976–1978	100	12	32	44	49	—	—	—	—	—	
John Flesch	R	1979–1980	5	0	1	1	4	—	—	—	—	—	
Dwight Foster	R	1981–1982	70	12	19	31	41	—	—	—	—	—	
Paul Gagne	L	1980–1982	120	35	28	63	29	—	—	—	—	—	
Paul Gardner	C	1976–1979	170	83	77	160	86	—	—	—	—	—	
Mario Giallonardo	D	1979–1981	23	0	3	3	6	—	—	—	—	—	
Mike Gillis	L	1978–1981	121	16	19	35	82	—	—	—	—	—	
Danny Gruen	L	1976–1977	29	8	10	18	12	—	—	—	—	—	
Peter Gustavsson	L	1981–1982	2	0	0	0	0	—	—	—	—	—	
Terry Harper	D	1980–1981	15	0	2	2	8	—	—	—	—	—	
Pat Hickey	L	1979–1980	24	7	9	16	10	—	—	—	—	—	
Dave Hudson	C	1976–1978	133	25	43	68	26	2	1	1	2	0	
Jack Hughes	D	1980–1982	46	2	5	7	104	—	—	—	—	—	
Rick Jodzio	R	1977–1978	32	0	5	5	28	—	—	—	—	—	
Trevor Johansen	D	1978–1981	108	4	18	22	79	—	—	—	—	—	
Larry Johnston	D	1976–1977	25	0	3	3	35	—	—	—	—	—	
Christer Kellgren	L	1981–1982	5	0	0	0	0	—	—	—	—	—	
Veli-Pekka Ketola	C	1981–1982	44	9	5	14	4	—	—	—	—	—	
Mike Kitchen	D	1976–1982	354	7	50	57	294	2	0	0	0	2	
Ralph Klassen	C	1977–1979	108	12	22	34	20	2	0	0	0	0	
Kevin Krook	D	1978–1979	3	0	0	0	2	—	—	—	—	—	
Michel Lachance	D	1978–1979	21	0	4	4	22	—	—	—	—	—	
Jeff Larmer	L	1981–1982	8	1	1	2	8	—	—	—	—	—	
Bryan Lefley	D	1976–1978	129	4	19	23	39	2	0	0	0	0	
Roger Lemelin	D	1976–1978	17	1	1	2	21	—	—	—	—	—	
Don Lever	C	1981–1982	59	22	28	50	20	—	—	—	—	—	
Tapio Levo	D	1981–1982	34	9	13	22	14	—	—	—	—	—	
Bill Lochead	L	1978–1979	27	4	2	6	14	—	—	—	—	—	
Bob Lorimer	D	1981–1982	79	5	15	20	68	—	—	—	—	—	
Bob MacMillan	R	1981–1982	57	18	32	50	27	—	—	—	—	—	
Merlin Malinowski	C	1978–1982	202	46	86	132	105	—	—	—	—	—	
Kevin Maxwell	C	1981–1982	34	5	5	10	44	—	—	—	—	—	
John McCahill	D	1977–1978	1	0	0	0	0	—	—	—	—	—	
Lanny McDonald	R	1979–1982	142	66	75	141	119	—	—	—	—	—	HHoF; 1992
Jim McElmury	D	1976–1978	57	7	23	30	16	—	—	—	—	—	
Mike McEwen	D	1979–1981	132	22	75	97	117	—	—	—	—	—	
Walt McKechnie	C	1979–1981	70	15	27	42	20	—	—	—	—	—	
Paul Messier	C	1978–1979	9	0	0	0	4	—	—	—	—	—	
Joe Micheletti	D	1981–1982	21	2	6	8	4	—	—	—	—	—	
Paul Miller	C	1981–1982	3	0	3	3	0	—	—	—	—	—	
Bob Miller	C	1980–1982	78	16	21	37	42	—	—	—	—	—	
Kevin Morrison	D	1979–1980	41	4	11	15	23	—	—	—	—	—	
Bob Neely	R	1977–1978	22	3	6	9	2	—	—	—	—	—	
Graeme Nicolson	D	1981–1982	41	2	7	9	51	—	—	—	—	—	
Lou Nistico	C	1977–1978	3	0	0	0	0	—	—	—	—	—	
Simon Nolet	R	1976–1977	52	12	19	31	10	—	—	—	—	—	
Craig Norwich	D	1980–1981	11	3	11	14	10	—	—	—	—	—	
Dennis O'Brien	D	1977–1978	16	0	2	2	12	—	—	—	—	—	
Dennis Owchar	D	1977–1980	120	12	36	48	54	2	1	0	1	2	
Clayton Pachal	R	1978–1979	24	2	3	5	69	—	—	—	—	—	
Wilf Paiement	R	1976–1980	257	106	148	254	336	2	0	0	0	7	
Steve Peters	C	1979–1980	2	0	1	1	0	—	—	—	—	—	
Randy Pierce	R	1977–1982	240	53	71	124	206	2	0	0	0	0	
Jukka Porvari	R	1981–1982	31	2	6	8	0	—	—	—	—	—	
Tracy Pratt	D	1976–1977	66	1	10	11	110	—	—	—	—	—	
Nelson Pyatt	C	1976–1980	189	39	36	75	32	—	—	—	—	—	
Joel Quenneville	D	1979–1982	170	20	41	61	167	—	—	—	—	—	
Rob Ramage	D	1979–1982	234	41	91	132	529	—	—	—	—	—	
Rene Robert	R	1979–1981	97	36	46	82	109	—	—	—	—	—	
Phil Roberto	R	1976–1977	22	1	5	6	23	—	—	—	—	—	
Randy Rota	C	1976–1977	1	0	0	0	0	—	—	—	—	—	
Don Saleski	R	1978–1980	67	10	8	18	27	—	—	—	—	—	
Bobby Schmautz	R	1979–1980	20	9	4	13	53	—	—	—	—	—	
Sean Shanahan	C	1976–1977	30	1	3	4	40	—	—	—	—	—	
Bobby Sheehan	C	1979–1981	71	4	7	11	12	—	—	—	—	—	
Larry Skinner	C	1976–1980	47	10	12	22	8	2	0	0	0	0	
Barry Smith	C	1979–1981	95	6	7	13	8	—	—	—	—	—	
Andy Spruce	L	1977–1979	121	22	36	58	74	2	0	2	2	0	
Peter Sturgeon	L	1979–1981	6	0	1	1	2	—	—	—	—	—	
Mark Suzor	D	1977–1978	60	4	15	19	56	—	—	—	—	—	
Steve Tambellini	C	1980–1982	92	35	42	77	16	—	—	—	—	—	
Dean Turner	D	1979–1981	31	1	0	1	55	—	—	—	—	—	
Jack Valiquette	C	1978–1981	178	51	68	119	27	—	—	—	—	—	
John Van Boxmeer	D	1976–1979	197	23	87	110	165	2	0	1	1	2	
Yvon Vautour	R	1980–1982	88	16	21	37	161	—	—	—	—	—	
Joe Ward	C	1980–1981	4	0	0	0	2	—	—	—	—	—	
Dave Watson	L	1979–1981	18	0	1	1	10	—	—	—	—	—	
Joe Watson	D	1978–1979	16	0	2	2	12	—	—	—	—	—	
Stan Weir	C	1981–1982	10	2	3	5	10	—	—	—	—	—	
John Wensink	L	1981–1982	57	5	3	8	152	—	—	—	—	—	

== Goaltenders ==
			Regular season							Playoffs					
Player	Seasons	GP	W	L	T	SO	GAA	SV%	GP	W	L	SO	GAA	SV%	Notes
Hardy Astrom	1979–1981	79	15	42	12	0	3.76	—	—	—	—	—	—	—	
Doug Favell	1976–1979	84	21	40	16	1	3.84	—	2	0	2	0	3	—	
Steve Janaszak	1981–1982	2	0	1	0	0	7.80	—	—	—	—	—	—	—	
Jari Kaarela	1980–1981	5	2	2	0	0	6.00	—	—	—	—	—	—	—	
Rick Laferriere	1981–1982	1	0	0	0	0	3.00	—	—	—	—	—	—	—	
Bill McKenzie	1976–1980	43	12	20	6	1	3.50	—	—	—	—	—	—	—	
Phil Myre	1980–1982	34	5	23	3	0	4.74	—	—	—	—	—	—	—	
Bill Oleschuk	1977–1980	54	7	27	10	1	3.98	—	—	—	—	—	—	—	
Michel Plasse	1976–1980	126	24	73	22	0	3.93	—	—	—	—	—	—	—	
Chico Resch	1980–1982	69	18	35	13	0	4.00	—	—	—	—	—	—	—	
Al Smith	1980–1981	37	9	18	4	0	4.75	—	—	—	—	—	—	—	

== See also ==
- List of NHL players
