= 1978 NHL dispersal draft =

Player selection draft

General information
- Date: June 15, 1978

Overview
- League: National Hockey League
- Expansion season: 1978–79
- Merging teams: Cleveland Barons; Minnesota North Stars

The 1978 NHL dispersal draft was held on June 15, 1978. It was the result of the merger of two National Hockey League (NHL) teams, the Cleveland Barons and the Minnesota North Stars. The NHL granted majority ownership of the North Stars to Barons owners Gordon Gund and George Gund III, after their bid to buy the Barons' home arena failed, and as the League feared the ownership group of the North Stars, another team performing poorly amid waning fan interest, would cease that team’s operations. To prevent the North Stars from folding, the NHL allowed the Gunds to merge them with the Barons; the Gunds would be majority owners of Minnesota North Stars.

The merged team was allowed to protect 14 players. The five worst teams in the NHL were granted access to pick one player each from the unprotected players in a dispersal draft. Only two of the teams picked a player, at which point the merged team was allowed to protect a 15th player; two others declined, and the last exchanged their pick for an extra first-round pick in the 1978 NHL amateur draft, held the following day. The remaining unprotected players remained members of the merged team; the large (two combined teams) roster of players was kept, traded or assigned to minor league affiliates to get the merged North Stars down to its opening day roster for the 1978–79 season.

== Background ==
After the 1977–78 NHL season, Barons owners Gordon Gund and George Gund III tried to buy the Richfield Coliseum, but failed. Meanwhile, fan interest in the North Stars was in decline as the team had missed the playoffs in five of the previous six seasons, and the league feared that the franchise was also on the verge of folding. On June 14, 1978, the league, in an unprecedented arrangement, granted approval for the Barons to merge with the North Stars, under the Gunds' ownership.

The agreement stipulated that the merged team would continue to participate in league games as the Minnesota North Stars, but they would assume the Barons' place in the Adams Division. A dispersal draft would be held just prior to the Amateur Draft on June 15, 1978—the day after the merger agreement. The new post-merger North Stars would be permitted to protect 10 skaters and two goaltenders from the pre-merger rosters of both teams, while the five other worst teams in the 1977–78 NHL season—the Washington Capitals, St. Louis Blues, Vancouver Canucks, Pittsburgh Penguins and Colorado Rockies, in that order—would each be permitted to pick one unprotected player from the North Stars. For each player picked, the North Stars would receive $30,000 from the selecting club. After the Capitals and Blues had made their selections the North Stars were permitted to add (or "fill in") another player to their protected list, and again after the Canucks and Penguins had made their choices

The Capitals (who finished second-last behind the North Stars) were also offered a choice: they could exercise the first pick in the Dispersal Draft, or could forfeit that pick in exchange for the right to make an additional pick at the end of the first round of the Amateur Draft.

=== Players selected ===
General managers Lou Nanne (North Stars) and Harry Howell (Barons) worked together to pick the protected players, protecting an equal number from each team. From the North Stars they retained Per-Olov Brasar, Brad Maxwell, Bryan Maxwell, Glen Sharpley, Tim Young and goalie Pete LoPresti. From the Barons they protected Mike Fidler, Rick Hampton, Al MacAdam, Dennis Maruk, Greg Smith and goalie Gilles Meloche.

The Capitals forfeited their dispersal draft pick in exchange for the extra first round pick in the Amateur Draft. The Blues picked Mike Crombeen (from Cleveland), the North Stars added Ron Zanussi to their protected list, and the Canucks picked Randy Holt (from Cleveland). The Penguins declined to select a player, the North Stars added Bob Stewart to their protected list, and the Rockies also declined to select a player, thus ending the draft.

#	Team	Player	1977–78 team
1.	Washington Capitals	Forfeited	
2.	St. Louis Blues	Mike Crombeen	Cleveland
Ron Zanussi added to North Stars' protected list
3.	Vancouver Canucks	Randy Holt	Cleveland
4.	Pittsburgh Penguins	Declined	
Bob Stewart added to North Stars' protected list
5.	Colorado Rockies	Declined	

== Aftermath ==
The recently retired Lou Nanne was named general manager of the merged team, and a number of the Barons players – notably goaltender Gilles Meloche and forwards Al MacAdam and Mike Fidler – bolstered the Minnesota lineup. Furthermore, Minnesota drafted Bobby Smith, who won the Calder Memorial Trophy as the NHL's top rookie that year, and Steve Payne, who recorded 42 goals in his second campaign in 1979–80.

A stay-at-home defenceman who was selected by the California Golden Seals in the 1975 NHL Draft, Greg Smith followed the franchise when it relocated to Cleveland in 1976, and upon the merger with Minnesota, his rights were protected by the North Stars in the dispersal draft. He played for Minnesota for three seasons, and his solid defensive play helped guide them to the finals in 1981.

Thirteen years later, in 1991, the merger was effectively undone as the Gunds assumed ownership of the expansion San Jose Sharks (occupying the same market as the Golden Seals did prior to their move to Cleveland) and the two teams split the players on the North Stars at the time in a Dispersal Draft, followed by an Expansion Draft. The North Stars moved to Dallas as the Dallas Stars in 1993. (Incidentally, the Barons name would come full circle: the Sharks formed their own minor-league team in Cleveland, also named the Cleveland Barons, from 2001 to 2006.)

The Barons remain the last franchise in the four major North American sports leagues to cease operations, and as a result the NHL fielded only 17 teams during the 1978–79 season. The NHL did not return to Ohio for 22 years, when the Columbus Blue Jackets began operations in the fall of 2000.

Dennis Maruk was the last Baron (and last Golden Seal as well) to be active in the NHL, retiring from the North Stars after the 1988–89 season with 356 goals in 888 games.
