= Wappel =

Wappel is a surname. Notable people with the surname include:

- Gord Wappel (born 1958), Canadian ice hockey player
- Tom Wappel (born 1950), Canadian politician in Ontario
