= Graeme Nicolson =

Canadian ice hockey player and veterinarian

- Born: January 13, 1958 (age 67); North Bay, Ontario, Canada
- Height: 6 ft 0 in (183 cm)
- Weight: 185 lb (84 kg; 13 st 3 lb)
- Position: Defence
- Shot: Right
- Played for: Boston Bruins; Colorado Rockies; New York Rangers
- NHL draft: 35th overall, 1978; Boston Bruins
- Playing career: 1978–1985

Graeme Butte Nicolson (born January 13, 1958, in North Bay, Ontario) is a former NHL defenceman. He played for the Boston Bruins, Colorado Rockies, and New York Rangers.

As of 2008, he works in Lakefield, Ontario, as a veterinarian.

== Championships ==
He won the 1983-84 CHL Championship (Adams Cup) as a member of the Tulsa Oilers team coached by Tom Webster.

== Career statistics ==
=== Regular season and playoffs ===
			Regular season					Playoffs
Season	Team	League	GP	G	A	Pts	PIM	GP	G	A	Pts	PIM
1975–76	Cornwall Royals	QMJHL	72	11	36	47	101	10	3	3	6	16
1976–77	Cornwall Royals	QMJHL	64	21	46	67	197	12	3	9	12	34
1977–78	Cornwall Royals	QMJHL	62	13	52	65	122	9	1	4	5	45
1978–79	Rochester Americans	AHL	80	16	35	51	112	—	—	—	—	—
1978–79	Boston Bruins	NHL	1	0	0	0	0	—	—	—	—	—
1979–80	Binghamton Dusters	AHL	79	7	36	43	151	—	—	—	—	—
1981–82	Fort Worth Texans	CHL	30	9	12	21	38	—	—	—	—	—
1981–82	Colorado Rockies	NHL	41	2	7	9	51	—	—	—	—	—
1982–83	Tulsa Oilers	CHL	64	19	28	47	166	—	—	—	—	—
1982–83	New York Rangers	NHL	10	0	0	0	9	—	—	—	—	—
1983–84	Tulsa Oilers	CHL	62	7	24	31	61	9	1	6	7	12
1984–85	Binghamton Whalers	AHL	37	3	9	12	53	4	0	0	0	2
1984–85	Flamborough Motts Clamatos	OHA-Sr	6	1	7	8	4	—	—	—	—	—
1985–86	Flamborough Motts Clamatos	OHA-Sr	—	—	—	—	—	—	—	—	—	—
1986–87	Brantford Motts Clamatos	OHA-Sr	—	—	—	—	—	—	—	—	—	—
AHL totals			196	26	80	106	316	4	0	0	0	2
CHL totals			156	35	64	99	265	9	1	6	7	12
NHL totals			52	2	7	9	60	—	—	—	—	—
