= Dale Yakiwchuk =

Canadian ice hockey player (1958–2024)

- Born: October 17, 1958; Cardston, Alberta, Canada
- Died: June 7, 2024 (aged 65); Calgary, Alberta, Canada
- Height: 6 ft 4 in (193 cm)
- Weight: 205 lb (93 kg; 14 st 9 lb)
- Position: Forward
- Played for: Winnipeg Jets (WHA)
- NHL draft: 30th overall, 1978; Montreal Canadiens
- Playing career: 1978–1987

Dale Yakiwchuk (October 17, 1958 – June 7, 2024) was a Canadian professional ice hockey forward. He was drafted in the second round, 30th overall, by the Montreal Canadiens in the 1978 NHL Amateur Draft; however, he never played in the National Hockey League. He played four games in the World Hockey Association with the Winnipeg Jets during the 1978–79 season, going scoreless. He starred for five seasons with the Milwaukee Admirals of the IHL, amassing 138 points during the 1982–83 season (38 goals 100 assists) while adding 223 penalty minutes. Yakiwchuk died in Calgary, Alberta on June 7, 2024, at the age of 65.

== Career statistics ==
| | | | Regular Season | | | | | Playoffs |
| Season | Team | League | GP | G | A | Pts | PIM | GP | G | A | Pts | PIM |
|---|---|---|---|---|---|---|---|---|---|---|---|---|
| 1975-76 | Taber Golden Suns | AJHL | 13 | 4 | 6 | 10 | 93 | — | — | — | — | — |
| 1975–76 | Lethbridge Broncos | WCHL | 43 | 3 | 14 | 17 | 146 | — | — | — | — | — |
| 1976–77 | Portland Winterhawks | WCHL | 59 | 24 | 53 | 77 | 151 | 8 | 2 | 6 | 8 | 21 |
| 1977–78 | Portland Winterhawks | WCHL | 64 | 32 | 52 | 84 | 312 | 8 | 0 | 3 | 3 | 55 |
| 1978–79 | Winnipeg Jets | WHA | 4 | 0 | 0 | 0 | 0 | — | — | — | — | — |
| 1978–79 | Nova Scotia Voyageurs | AHL | 12 | 3 | 1 | 4 | 15 | 8 | 0 | 0 | 0 | 0 |
| 1978–79 | Philadelphia Firebirds | AHL | 46 | 2 | 18 | 20 | 101 | — | — | — | — | — |
| 1979–80 | Cincinnati Stingers | CHL | 30 | 4 | 15 | 19 | 75 | — | — | — | — | — |
| 1979–80 | Tulsa Oilers | CHL | 37 | 3 | 9 | 12 | 76 | 3 | 1 | 1 | 2 | 4 |
| 1980–81 | Richmond Rifles | EHL | 52 | 15 | 35 | 50 | 118 | — | — | — | — | — |
| 1980–81 | Baltimore Clippers | EHL | 18 | 11 | 14 | 25 | 73 | 4 | 1 | 2 | 3 | 46 |
| 1981–82 | Milwaukee Admirals | IHL | 72 | 18 | 57 | 75 | 249 | 5 | 2 | 1 | 3 | 23 |
| 1982–83 | Milwaukee Admirals | IHL | 79 | 38 | 100 | 138 | 223 | 11 | 2 | 5 | 7 | 54 |
| 1983–84 | Milwaukee Admirals | IHL | 74 | 35 | 69 | 104 | 67 | 4 | 2 | 2 | 4 | 12 |
| 1984–85 | Kalamazoo Wings | IHL | 82 | 25 | 45 | 70 | 187 | 11 | 4 | 2 | 6 | 56 |
| 1985–86 | Milwaukee Admirals | IHL | 82 | 33 | 68 | 101 | 265 | 4 | 0 | 4 | 4 | 20 |
| 1986–87 | Milwaukee Admirals | IHL | 67 | 27 | 36 | 63 | 111 | — | — | — | — | — |
| 1986–87 | Kalamazoo Wings | IHL | 16 | 4 | 12 | 16 | 69 | 5 | 1 | 4 | 5 | 31 |
| WHA totals | | | 4 | 0 | 0 | 0 | 0 | — | — | — | — | — |
