= Jari Viitala =

Finnish ice hockey player

- Born: December 1, 1958 (age 67) Tampere, Finland
- Height: 5 ft 9 in (175 cm)
- Weight: 174 lb (79 kg; 12 st 6 lb)
- Position: Forward
- Shot: Left
- Played for: SM-liiga; Ilves
- NHL draft: 190th overall, 1978; Colorado Rockies
- Playing career: 1977–1988

Jari Viitala (born December 1, 1958) is a Finnish professional ice hockey player. He was selected by the Colorado Rockies in the 12th round (190th overall) of the 1978 NHL Amateur Draft. He represented Finland at the 1978 World Junior Ice Hockey Championships.

Viitala made his SM-liiga debut playing with Ilves during the 1977–78. He played parts of nine season and 304 regular-season games with Ives before retiring after the 1987–88 SM-liiga season.
