= 1978 NHL amateur draft =

1978 North American ice hockey draft

General information
- Date: June 15, 1978
- Location: Queen Elizabeth Hotel; Montreal, Quebec, Canada

Overview
- 234 total selections in 22 rounds
- First selection: (Canada) Bobby Smith (Minnesota North Stars)
- Hall of Famers: 1: D Viacheslav Fetisov

The 1978 NHL amateur draft was the 16th draft for the National Hockey League. It was hosted at the Queen Elizabeth Hotel in Montreal on June 15, 1978. It was the last draft to be called the "amateur draft" before the process was renamed to the NHL entry draft in 1979.

The last active player in the NHL from this draft class was Viacheslav Fetisov, who retired after the 1997–98 season, although he was re-drafted in 1983.

== Selections by round ==
Below are listed the selections in the 1978 NHL amateur draft. The Washington Capitals chose to take an extra pick in the first round instead of participating in the dispersal draft (Tim Coulis), and were allowed to pick in Cleveland's position in the second round to complete the Bob Girard/Walt McKechnie trade. The New York Islanders had traded their fourth round selection to Cleveland, so that pick was forfeited.

= NHL All-Star team ·	= NHL All-Star (Note: Players are identified as an All-Star if they were selected for the All-Star game at any time in their career.) ·	= NHL All-Star and NHL All-Star team ·	= Hall of Famers

Club teams are located in North America unless otherwise noted.

=== Round one ===
#	Player	Nationality	NHL team	College/junior/club team
1	Bobby Smith (C)	Canada	Minnesota North Stars	Ottawa 67's (OHL)
2	Ryan Walter (C)	Canada	Washington Capitals	Seattle Breakers (WCHL)
3	Wayne Babych (RW)	Canada	St. Louis Blues	Portland Winterhawks (WCHL)
4	Bill Derlago (C)	Canada	Vancouver Canucks	Brandon Wheat Kings (WCHL)
5	Mike Gillis (LW)	Canada	Colorado Rockies	Kingston Canadians (OMJHL)
6	Behn Wilson (D)	Canada	Philadelphia Flyers (from Pittsburgh)^{1}	Kingston Canadians (OMJHL)
7	Ken Linseman (C)	Canada	Philadelphia Flyers (from the Rangers)^{2}	Birmingham Bulls (WHA)
8	Dan Geoffrion (RW)	Canada	Montreal Canadiens (from Los Angeles)^{3}	Cornwall Royals (QMJHL)
9	Willie Huber (D)	Canada	Detroit Red Wings	Hamilton Fincups (OMJHL)
10	Tim Higgins (RW)	Canada	Chicago Black Hawks	Ottawa 67's (OMJHL)
11	Brad Marsh (D)	Canada	Atlanta Flames	London Knights (OMJHL)
12	Brent Peterson (C)	Canada	Detroit Red Wings (from Toronto)^{4}	Portland Winterhawks (WCHL)
13	Larry Playfair (D)	Canada	Buffalo Sabres	Portland Winterhawks (WCHL)
14	Danny Lucas (RW)	Canada	Philadelphia Flyers	Sault Ste. Marie Greyhounds (OMJHL)
15	Steve Tambellini (C)	Canada	New York Islanders	Lethbridge Broncos (WCHL)
16	Al Secord (LW)	Canada	Boston Bruins	Hamilton Fincups (OMJHL)
17	Dave Hunter (LW)	Canada	Montreal Canadiens	Sudbury Wolves (OMJHL)
18	Tim Coulis (LW)	Canada	Washington Capitals^{5}	Hamilton Fincups (OMJHL)

1. The Pittsburgh Penguins' first-round pick went to the Philadelphia Flyers as the result of a trade on June 14, 1978, that sent Tom Bladon, Orest Kindrachuk and Ross Lonsberry to Pittsburgh in exchange for future considerations (Pittsburgh's eighth-round pick in 1978) and this pick.
2. The New York Rangers' first-round pick went to the Philadelphia Flyers as the result of compensation on June 2, 1978, for the right to hire Fred Shero as their new head coach. Philadelphia received this pick as compensation for the hire.
3. The Los Angeles Kings' first-round pick went to the Montreal Canadiens as the result of a trade on June 12, 1976, that sent Glenn Goldup and a third-round pick in 1978 to Los Angeles in exchange for a third-round pick in 1977 and this pick.
4. The Toronto Maple Leafs' first-round pick went to the Detroit Red Wings as the result of a trade on March 13, 1978, that sent Dan Maloney and a second-round pick in 1980 to Toronto in exchange for Errol Thompson, a second-round pick in 1978, a first-round pick in 1980 and this pick.
5. The Washington Capitals chose to take an extra pick in the first round instead of participating in the dispersal draft. They were awarded pick #18.

=== Round two ===
#	Player	Nationality	NHL team	College/junior/club team
19	Steve Payne (LW)	Canada	Minnesota North Stars	Ottawa 67's (OMJHL)
20	Paul Mulvey (LW)	Canada	Washington Capitals	Portland Winterhawks (WCHL)
21	Joel Quenneville (D)	Canada	Toronto Maple Leafs (from St. Louis)^{1}	Windsor Spitfires (OMJHL)
22	Curt Fraser (LW)	United States	Vancouver Canucks	Victoria Cougars (WCHL)
23	Paul MacKinnon (D)	Canada	Washington Capitals (from Cleveland)^{2}	Peterborough Petes (OMJHL)
24	Steve Christoff (C)	United States	Minnesota North Stars (from Colorado)^{3}	University of Minnesota (WCHA)
25	Mike Meeker (C)	Canada	Pittsburgh Penguins	Peterborough Petes (OMJHL)
26	Don Maloney (LW)	Canada	New York Rangers	Kitchener Rangers (OMJHL)
27	Merlin Malinowski (C)	Canada	Colorado Rockies (from Los Angeles via Philadelphia)^{4}	Medicine Hat Tigers (WCHL)
28	Glenn Hicks (LW)	Canada	Detroit Red Wings	Flin-Flon Bombers (WCHL)
29	Doug Lecuyer (LW)	Canada	Chicago Black Hawks	Portland Winterhawks (WCHL)
30	Dale Yakiwchuk (C)	Canada	Montreal Canadiens (from Atlanta)^{5}	Portland Winterhawks (WCHL)
31	Al Jensen (G)	Canada	Detroit Red Wings (from Toronto)^{6}	Hamilton Fincups (OMJHL)
32	Tony McKegney (LW)	Canada	Buffalo Sabres	Kingston Canadians (OMJHL)
33	Mike Simurda (RW)	Canada	Philadelphia Flyers	Kingston Canadians (OMJHL)
34	Randy Johnston (D)	Canada	New York Islanders	Peterborough Petes (OMJHL)
35	Graeme Nicolson (D)	Canada	Boston Bruins	Cornwall Royals (QMJHL)
36	Ron Carter (RW)	Canada	Montreal Canadiens	Sherbrooke Castors (QMJHL)

1. The St. Louis Blues' second-round pick went to the Toronto Maple Leafs as the result of a compensation to Toronto with cash from St. Louis for restricted free agent Rod Seiling on September 9, 1976.
2. The Cleveland Barons' second-round pick went to the Washington Capitals as the result of a trade on December 9, 1977, that sent Walt McKechnie to Cleveland in exchange for Bob Girard and this pick.
  The Washington Capitals chose to take an extra pick in the first round instead of participating in the dispersal draft and were allowed to pick in Cleveland's position in the second round to complete the trade.
3. The Colorado Rockies' second-round pick went to the Minnesota North Stars as the result of a trade on December 9, 1975, that sent the rights to Henry Boucha to Kansas City in exchange for this pick. The Kansas City Scouts relocated to become the Colorado Rockies for the 1976–77 NHL season.
4. The Philadelphia Flyers' second-round pick went to the Colorado Rockies as the result of a trade on June 15, 1978, that sent Colorado's second-round pick in 1979 in exchange for this pick.
  Philadelphia previously acquired this pick as the result of a trade on September 29, 1976, that sent Dave Schultz to Los Angeles in exchange for a fourth-round pick in 1977 and this pick.
5. The Atlanta Flames' second-round pick went to the Montreal Canadiens as the result of a trade on May 15, 1973, that sent Montreal's two first-round pick (#2 - Tom Lysiak and #16 - Vic Mercredi) and second-round pick (Eric Vail) in 1973 NHL amateur draft to Atlanta in exchange for Atlanta's first-round pick (#5 - STL - John Davidson) in the 1973 NHL amateur draft, first-round pick in the 1977 NHL amateur draft (Mark Napier) and this pick.
6. The Toronto Maple Leafs' second-round pick went to the Detroit Red Wings as the result of a trade on March 13, 1978, that sent Dan Maloney and a second-round pick in 1980 to Toronto in exchange for Errol Thompson, a first-round pick in 1978, a first-round pick in 1980 and this pick.

=== Round three ===
#	Player	Nationality	NHL team	College/junior/club team
37	Gord Salt (RW)	Canada	Philadelphia Flyers (from Minnesota)^{1}	Michigan Technological University (WCHA)
38	Glen Currie (C)	Canada	Washington Capitals	Laval National (QMJHL)
39	Steve Harrison (D)	Canada	St. Louis Blues	Toronto Marlboros (OMJHL)
40	Stan Smyl (RW)	Canada	Vancouver Canucks	New Westminster Bruins (WCHL)
41	Paul Messier (C)	Canada	Colorado Rockies	University of Denver (WCHA)
42	Richard David (LW)	Canada	Montreal Canadiens (from Pittsburgh)^{2}	Trois-Rivières Draveurs (QMJHL)
43	Ray Markham (C)	Canada	New York Rangers	Flin Flon Bombers (WCHL)
44	Dean Turner (D)	United States	New York Rangers (from Los Angeles)^{3}	University of Michigan (WCHA)
45	Jay Johnston (D)	Canada	Washington Capitals (from Detroit)^{4}	Hamilton Fincups (OMJHL)
46	Rick Paterson (C)	Canada	Chicago Black Hawks	Cornwall Royals (QMJHL)
47	Tim Bernhardt (G)	Canada	Atlanta Flames	Cornwall Royals (QMJHL)
48	Mark Kirton (C)	Canada	Toronto Maple Leafs	Peterborough Petes (OMJHL)
49	Rob McClanahan (C)	United States	Buffalo Sabres	University of Minnesota (WCHA)
50	Glen Cochrane (D)	Canada	Philadelphia Flyers	Victoria Cougars (WCHL)
51	Dwayne Lowdermilk (D)	Canada	New York Islanders	Seattle Breakers (WCHL)
52	Brad Knelson (D)	Canada	Boston Bruins	Lethbridge Broncos (WCHL)
53	Doug Derkson (C)	Canada	Detroit Red Wings (from Montreal via Los Angeles)^{5}	New Westminster Bruins (WCHL)

1. The Minnesota North Stars' third-round pick went to the Philadelphia Flyers as the result of a trade on October 28, 1977, that sent Harvey Bennett Jr. to Minnesota in exchange for Blake Dunlop and this pick.
2. The Pittsburgh Penguins' third-round pick went to the Montreal Canadiens as the result of a trade on August 11, 1976, that sent Don Awrey to Pittsburgh in exchange for this pick.
3. The Los Angeles Kings' third-round pick went to the New York Rangers as the result of a trade on August 31, 1977, that sent the rights to Pete Stemkowski to Los Angeles in exchange for future considerations. The future considerations became this pick.
4. The Detroit Red Wings' third-round pick went to the Washington Capitals as the result of a trade on August 17, 1977, that sent the rights to Ron Low and a third-round pick in 1979 to Detroit in exchange for Walt McKechnie, a second-round pick in 1979 and this pick.
5. The Los Angeles Kings' third-round pick went to the Detroit Red Wings as the result of a trade on January 9, 1978, that sent Danny Grant to Los Angeles in exchange for the rights to Barry Long and this pick.
  Los Angeles previously acquired this pick as the result of a trade with Montreal on June 12, 1976, that sent a third-round pick in 1977 and a first-round pick in 1978 in exchange for Glenn Goldup and this pick.

=== Round four ===
#	Player	Nationality	NHL team	College/junior/club team
54	Curt Giles (D)	Canada	Minnesota North Stars	University of Minnesota-Duluth (WCHA)
55	Bengt Gustafsson (RW)	Sweden	Washington Capitals	Färjestad BK Karlstad (SEL)
56	Harald Luckner (C)	Sweden	Vancouver Canucks (from St. Louis)^{1}	Färjestad BK Karlstad (SEL)
57	Brad Smith (RW)	Canada	Vancouver Canucks	Sudbury Wolves (OMJHL)
	Pick forfeited		New York Islanders (from Cleveland)^{2}	
58	Dave Watson (LW)	Canada	Colorado Rockies	Sault Ste. Marie Greyhounds (OMJHL)
59	Dave Silk (RW)	United States	New York Rangers (from Pittsburgh)^{3}	Boston University (ECAC)
60	Andre Dore (D)	Canada	New York Rangers	Quebec Remparts (QMJHL)
61	Shane Pearsall (LW)	Canada	Pittsburgh Penguins (from Los Angeles)^{4}	Ottawa 67's (OMJHL)
62	Bjorn Skaare (C)	Norway	Detroit Red Wings	Ottawa 67's (OMJHL)
63	Brian Young (D)	Canada	Chicago Black Hawks	New Westminster Bruins (WCHL)
64	Jim MacRae (LW)	Canada	Atlanta Flames	London Knights (OMJHL)
65	Bob Parent (G)	Canada	Toronto Maple Leafs	Kitchener Rangers (OMJHL)
66	Mike Gazdic (D)	Canada	Buffalo Sabres	Sudbury Wolves (OMJHL)
67	Russ Wilderman (C)	Canada	Philadelphia Flyers	Seattle Breakers (WCHL)
	Not exercised		Cleveland Barons (from the Islanders)^{5}	
68	George Buat (RW)	Canada	Boston Bruins	Seattle Breakers (WCHL)
69	Kevin Reeves (C)	Canada	Montreal Canadiens	Montreal Juniors (QMJHL)

1. The St. Louis Blues' fourth-round pick went to the Vancouver Canucks as the result of a trade on June 12, 1978, that sent Mike Walton to St. Louis in exchange for future considerations and this pick.
2. Draft pick forfeited by the Islanders due to Barons-North Stars merger on June 14, one day prior to the 1978 NHL Amateur Draft.
  Originally, the Cleveland Barons' fourth-round pick would have gone to the New York Islanders as the result of a trade on January 10, 1978, that sent Jean-Paul Parise, Jean Potvin Wayne Merrick, and the Islanders' fourth-round pick in the 1978 NHL Amateur Draft to Cleveland in exchange for Wayne Merrick, Darcy Regier and this pick.
3. The Pittsburgh Penguins' fourth-round pick went to the New York Rangers as the result of a trade on October 8, 1976, that sent Dunc Wilson to Pittsburgh in exchange for this pick.
4. The Los Angeles Kings' fourth-round pick went to the Pittsburgh Penguins as the result of a trade on November 2, 1977, that sent Syl Apps Jr. and Hartland Monahan to Los Angeles in exchange for Gene Carr, Dave Schultz and this pick.
5. Draft pick not exercised by Cleveland due to Barons-North Stars merger on June 14, one day prior to the 1978 NHL Amateur Draft.
  Originally, the New York Islanders fourth-round pick would have gone to the Cleveland Barons' as the result of a trade on January 10, 1978, that sent Wayne Merrick, Darcy Regier and Cleveland's fourth-round pick in the 1978 NHL Amateur Draft to the Islanders in exchange for Jean-Paul Parise, Jean Potvin and this pick.

=== Round five ===
#	Player	Nationality	NHL team	College/junior/club team
70	Roy Kerling (LW)	Canada	Minnesota North Stars	Cornell University (ECAC)
71	Lou Franceschetti (LW)	Canada	Washington Capitals	Niagara Falls Flyers (OMJHL)
72	Kevin Willison (D)	Canada	St. Louis Blues	Billings Bighorns (WCHL)
73	Tim Thomlison (G)	Canada	Colorado Rockies (from Vancouver)^{1}	Billings Bighorns (WCHL)
74	Rod Guimont (RW)	Canada	Colorado Rockies	Lethbridge Broncos (WCHL)
75	Rob Garner (C)	Canada	Pittsburgh Penguins	Toronto Marlboros (OMJHL)
76	Mike McDougal (RW)	United States	New York Rangers	Port Huron Flags (IHL)
77	Paul Mancini (LW)	Canada	Los Angeles Kings	Sault Ste. Marie Greyhounds (OMJHL)
78	Ted Nolan (C)	Canada	Detroit Red Wings	Toronto Marlboros (OMJHL)
79	Mark Murphy (LW)	Canada	Chicago Black Hawks	Sault Ste. Marie Greyhounds (OMJHL)
80	Gord Wappel (D)	Canada	Atlanta Flames	Regina Pats (WCHL)
81	Jordy Douglas (LW)	Canada	Toronto Maple Leafs	Flin Flon Bombers (WCHL)
82	Randy Ireland (G)	Canada	Buffalo Sabres	Flint Generals (IHL)
83	Brad Tamblyn (D)	Canada	Philadelphia Flyers	University of Toronto (CIAU)
84	Greg Hay (LW)	United States	New York Islanders	Portland Winterhawks (WCHL)
85	Daryl MacLeod (LW)	United States	Boston Bruins	Boston University (ECAC)
86	Mike Boyd (D)	Canada	Montreal Canadiens	Sault Ste. Marie Greyhounds (OMJHL)

1. The Vancouver Canucks' fifth-round pick went to the Colorado Rockies as the result of a trade on September 12, 1976, that sent Colorado's fourth-round pick in 1977 NHL amateur draft to Vancouver in exchange for this pick.

=== Round six ===
#	Player	Nationality	NHL team	College/junior/club team
87	Bob Bergloff (D)	United States	Minnesota North Stars	University of Minnesota (WCHA)
88	Vince Magnan (LW)	Canada	Washington Capitals	University of Denver (WCHA)
89	Jim Nill (RW)	Canada	St. Louis Blues	Medicine Hat Tigers (WCHL)
90	Gerry Minor (C)	Canada	Vancouver Canucks	Regina Pats (WCHL)
91	John Hynes (G)	United States	Colorado Rockies	Harvard University (ECAC)
92	Mel Hewitt (D)	Canada	Toronto Maple Leafs (from Pittsburgh)^{1}	Calgary Wranglers (WCHL)
93	Tom Laidlaw (D)	Canada	New York Rangers	Northern Michigan University (CCHA)
94	Doug Keans (G)	Canada	Los Angeles Kings	Oshawa Generals (OMJHL)
95	Sylvain Locas (C)	Canada	Detroit Red Wings	Sherbrooke Castors (QMJHL)
96	Dave Feamster (D)	United States	Chicago Black Hawks	Colorado College (WCHA)
97	Greg Meredith (RW)	Canada	Atlanta Flames	University of Notre Dame (WCHA)
98	Norm Lefebvre (RW)	Canada	Toronto Maple Leafs	Trois-Rivières Draveurs (QMJHL)
99	Cam MacGregor (LW)	Canada	Buffalo Sabres	Cornwall Royals (QMJHL)
100	Mark Taylor (C)	Canada	Philadelphia Flyers	University of North Dakota (WCHA)
101	Kelly Davis (D)	Canada	New York Islanders	Flin Flon Bombers (WCHL)
102	Jeff Brubaker (LW)	United States	Boston Bruins	Peterborough Petes (OMJHL)
103	Keith Acton (C)	Canada	Montreal Canadiens	Peterborough Petes (OMJHL)

1. The Pittsburgh Penguins' sixth-round pick went to the Toronto Maple Leafs as the result of a trade on June 13, 1978, that sent Randy Carlyle and George Ferguson to Pittsburgh in exchange for Dave Burrows and this pick.

=== Round seven ===
#	Player	Nationality	NHL team	College/junior/club team
104	Kim Spencer (D)	Canada	Minnesota North Stars	Victoria Cougars (WCHL)
105	Mats Hallin (LW)	Sweden	Washington Capitals	Södertälje SK (Sweden)
106	Steve Stockman (C)	Canada	St. Louis Blues	Cornwall Royals (QMJHL)
107	Dave Ross (LW)	Canada	Vancouver Canucks	Portland Winterhawks (WCHL)
108	Andy Clark (D)	Canada	Colorado Rockies	Lake Superior State University (CCHA)
109	Paul MacLean (RW)	Canada	St. Louis Blues (from Pittsburgh)^{1}	Hull Olympiques (QMJHL)
110	Dan Clark (D)	Canada	New York Rangers	Milwaukee Admirals (IHL)
111	Don Waddell (D)	United States	Los Angeles Kings	Northern Michigan University (CCHA)
112	Wes George (LW)	Canada	Detroit Red Wings	Saskatoon Blades (WCHL)
113	Dave Mancuso (D)	Canada	Chicago Black Hawks	Windsor Spitfires (OMJHL)
114	Dave Hindmarch (RW)	Canada	Atlanta Flames	University of Alberta (CIAU)
115	John Scammell (D)	Canada	Toronto Maple Leafs	Lethbridge Broncos (WCHL)
116	Dan Eastman (C)	Canada	Buffalo Sabres	Peterborough Petes (OMJHL)
117	Mike Ewanouski (RW)	United States	Philadelphia Flyers	Boston College (ECAC)
118	Richard Pepin (LW)	Canada	New York Islanders	Laval National (QMJHL)
119	Murray Skinner (G)	Canada	Boston Bruins	Lake Superior State University (CCHA)
120	Jim Lawson (RW)	Canada	Montreal Canadiens	Brown University (ECAC)

1. The Pittsburgh Penguins' seventh-round pick went to the St. Louis Blues as the result of a trade on June 15, 1978, that sent cash to Pittsburgh in exchange for this pick.

=== Round eight ===
#	Player	Nationality	NHL team	College/junior/club team
121	Mike Cotter (D)	Canada	Minnesota North Stars	Bowling Green University (CCHA)
122	Rich Sirois (G)	Canada	Washington Capitals	Milwaukee Admirals (IHL)
123	Denis Houle (RW)	Canada	St. Louis Blues	Hamilton Fincups (OMJHL)
124	Steve O'Neill (LW)	United States	Vancouver Canucks	Providence College (ECAC))
125	John Olver (RW)	Canada	Colorado Rockies	University of Michigan (WCHA)
126	Jerry Price (G)	Canada	Philadelphia Flyers (from Pittsburgh)^{1}	Portland Winterhawks (WCHL)
127	Greg Kostenko (D)	Canada	New York Rangers	Ohio State University (CCHA)
128	Rob Mierkalns (C)	Canada	Los Angeles Kings	Hamilton Fincups (OMJHL)
129	John Barrett (D)	Canada	Detroit Red Wings	Windsor Spitfires (OMJHL)
130	Sandy Ross (D)	Canada	Chicago Black Hawks	Colgate University (ECAC)
131	Dave Morrison (RW)	Canada	Atlanta Flames	Calgary Wranglers (WCHL)
132	Kevin Reinhart (D)	Canada	Toronto Maple Leafs	Kitchener Rangers (OMJHL)
133	Eric Strobel (C)	United States	Buffalo Sabres	University of Minnesota (WCHA)
134	Darre Switzer (C)	Canada	Philadelphia Flyers	Medicine Hat Tigers (WCHL)
135	Dave Cameron (C)	Canada	New York Islanders	University of Prince Edward Island (CIAU)
136	Bobby Hehir (C)	United States	Boston Bruins	Boston College (ECAC)
137	Larry Landon (RW)	Canada	Montreal Canadiens	Rensselaer Polytechnic Institute (ECAC)

1. The Pittsburgh Penguins' eighth-round pick went to the Philadelphia Flyers as the result of a trade on June 14, 1978, that sent Tom Bladon, Orest Kindrachuk and Ross Lonsberry to Pittsburgh in exchange for Pittsburgh's first-round pick in 1978 and future considerations (this pick).

=== Round nine ===
#	Player	Nationality	NHL team	College/junior/club team
138	Brent Gogol (RW)	Canada	Minnesota North Stars	Billings Bighorns (WCHL)
139	Denis Pomerleau (RW)	Canada	Washington Capitals	Trois-Rivières Draveurs (QMJHL)
140	Tony Meagher (RW)	Canada	St. Louis Blues	Boston University (ECAC)
141	Charlie Antetomaso (D)	United States	Vancouver Canucks	Boston College (ECAC)
142	Kevin Krook (D)	Canada	Colorado Rockies	Regina Pats (WCHL)
143	Rick Simpson (RW)	Canada	St. Louis Blues (from Pittsburgh)^{1}	Medicine Hat Tigers (WCHL)
144	Brian McDavid (D)	Canada	New York Rangers	Kitchener Rangers (OMJHL)
145	Rick Scully (LW)	Canada	Los Angeles Kings	Brown University (ECAC)
146	Jim Malazdrewicz (LW)	Canada	Detroit Red Wings	St. Boniface Saints (MJHL)
147	Mark Locken (G)	Canada	Chicago Black Hawks	Niagara Falls Flyers (OMJHL)
148	Doug Todd (RW)	Canada	Atlanta Flames	University of Michigan (WCHA)
149	Mike Waghorne (D)	United States	Toronto Maple Leafs	University of New Hampshire (ECAC)
150	Eugene O'Sullivan (C)	Canada	Buffalo Sabres	Calgary Wranglers (WCHL)
151	Greg Francis (D)	Canada	Philadelphia Flyers	St. Lawrence University (ECAC)
152	Paul Joswiak (G)	United States	New York Islanders	University of Minnesota (WCHA)
153	Craig MacTavish (C)	Canada	Boston Bruins	University of Massachusetts Lowell (ECAC)
154	Kevin Constantine (G)	United States	Montreal Canadiens	Rensselaer Polytechnic Institute (ECAC)

1. The Pittsburgh Penguins' ninth-round pick went to the St. Louis Blues as the result of a trade on June 15, 1978, that sent cash to Pittsburgh in exchange for this pick.

=== Round ten ===
#	Player	Nationality	NHL team	College/junior/club team
155	Mike Seide (LW)	United States	Minnesota North Stars	Bloomington Junior Stars (USHL)
156	Barry Heard (G)	Canada	Washington Capitals	London Knights (OMJHL)
157	Jim Lockhurst (G)	Canada	St. Louis Blues	Kingston Canadians (OMJHL)
158	Richard Martens (G)	Canada	Vancouver Canucks	New Westminster Bruins (WCHL)
159	Jeff Jensen (LW)	United States	Colorado Rockies	Lake Superior State University (CCHA)
160	Bob Froese (G)	Canada	St. Louis Blues (from Pittsburgh)^{1}	Niagara Falls Flyers (OMJHL)
161	Mark Rodrigues (G)	United States	New York Rangers	Yale University (ECAC)
162	Brad Thiessen (C)	Canada	Los Angeles Kings	Toronto Marlboros (OMJHL)
163	Geoff Shaw (RW)	Canada	Detroit Red Wings	Hamilton Fincups (OMJHL)
164	Glenn Van (D)	United States	Chicago Black Hawks	Colorado College (WCHA)
165	Mark Green (C)	United States	Atlanta Flames	Sherbrooke Castors (QMJHL)
166	Laurie Cuvelier (D)	Canada	Toronto Maple Leafs	St. Francis Xavier University (CIAU)
167	Rick Berard (D)	Canada	Philadelphia Flyers (from Buffalo)^{2}	St. Mary's University (CIAU)
168	Don Lucia (D)	United States	Philadelphia Flyers	University of Notre Dame (WCHA)
169	Scott Cameron (D)	Canada	New York Islanders	University of Notre Dame (WCHA)
170	Dan Lerg (C)	United States	St. Louis Blues (from Boston)^{3}	University of Michigan (WCHA)
171	John Swan (C)	Canada	Montreal Canadiens	McGill University (CIAU)

1. The Pittsburgh Penguins' tenth-round pick went to the St. Louis Blues as the result of a trade on June 15, 1978, that sent cash to Pittsburgh in exchange for this pick.
2. The Buffalo Sabres' tenth-round pick went to the Philadelphia Flyers as the result of a trade on June 15, 1978, that sent cash to Buffalo in exchange for this pick.
3. The Boston Bruins' tenth-round pick went to the St. Louis Blues as the result of a trade on June 15, 1978, that sent cash to Boston in exchange for this pick.

=== Round eleven ===
#	Player	Nationality	NHL team	College/junior/club team
172	Mark Toffolo (D)	United States	Washington Capitals	Port Huron Flags (IHL)
173	Risto Siltanen (D)	Finland	St. Louis Blues	Ilves (Finland)
174	Bo Ericson (D)	Sweden	Colorado Rockies	AIK (Sweden)
175	Dan Hermansson (LW)	Sweden	St. Louis Blues (from Pittsburgh)^{1}	Karlskoga (Sweden)
176	Steve Weeks (G)	Canada	New York Rangers	Northern Michigan University (CCHA)
177	Jim Armstrong (LW)	United States	Los Angeles Kings	Clarkson University (ECAC)
178	Carl Van Harrewyn (D)	Canada	Detroit Red Wings	New Westminster Bruins (WCHL)
179	Darryl Sutter (LW)	Canada	Chicago Black Hawks	Lethbridge Broncos (WCHL)
180	Bob Sullivan (LW)	Canada	Atlanta Flames	Toledo Goaldiggers (IHL)
181	Jean-Francois Boutin (LW)	Canada	St. Louis Blues (from Toronto)^{2}	Verdun Eperviers (QMJHL)
182	Mark Berge (D)	United States	Philadelphia Flyers (from Buffalo)^{3}	University of North Dakota (WCHA)
183	Ken Moore (G)	United States	Philadelphia Flyers	Clarkson University (ECAC)
184	Christer Lowdahl (C)	Sweden	New York Islanders	Örebro (Sweden)
185	John Sullivan (RW)	United States	St. Louis Blues (from Boston)^{4}	Providence College (ECAC)
186	Daniel Metivier (RW)	Canada	Montreal Canadiens	Hull Olympiques (QMJHL)

1. The Pittsburgh Penguins' eleventh-round pick went to the St. Louis Blues as the result of a trade on June 15, 1978, that sent cash to Pittsburgh in exchange for this pick.
2. The Toronto Maple Leafs' eleventh-round pick went to the St. Louis Blues as the result of a trade on June 15, 1978, that sent cash to Toronto in exchange for this pick.
3. The Buffalo Sabres' eleventh-round pick went to the Philadelphia Flyers as the result of a trade on June 15, 1978, that sent cash to Buffalo in exchange for this pick.
4. The Boston Bruins' eleventh-round pick went to the St. Louis Blues as the result of a trade on June 15, 1978, that sent cash to Boston in exchange for this pick.

=== Round twelve ===
Ladislav Svozil was the first Czechoslovak player drafted in the history of the NHL Draft. The Red Wings selected Svozil in the 12th round. Bernhardt Engelbrecht was the first German player drafted in the history of the NHL Draft. The Flames selected him in the 12th round.

#	Player	Nationality	NHL team	College/junior/club team
187	Paul Hogan (LW)	Canada	Washington Capitals	Regina Pats (WCHL)
188	Serge Menard (RW)	Canada	St. Louis Blues	Montreal Juniors (QMJHL)
189	Steve Barger (RW)	United States	Washington Capitals (from Vancouver)^{1}	Boston College (ECAC)
190	Jari Viitala (C)	Finland	Colorado Rockies	Ilves (Finland)
191	Don Boyd (D)	Canada	St. Louis Blues (from Pittsburgh)^{2}	Rensselaer Polytechnic Institute (ECAC)
192	Pierre Daigneault (LW)	Canada	New York Rangers	Cégep de Saint-Laurent (CIAU)
193	Claude Larochelle (C)	Canada	Los Angeles Kings	Hull Olympiques (QMJHL)
194	Ladislav Svozil (LW)	Czechoslovakia	Detroit Red Wings	HC Vitkovice (Czechoslovakia)
195	Jim Olson (C)	United States	Philadelphia Flyers (from Chicago)^{3}	St. Paul Vulcans (USHL)
196	Bernhard Engelbrecht (G)	West Germany	Atlanta Flames	EV Landshut (West Germany)
197	Paul Stasiuk (LW)	Canada	St. Louis Blues (from Toronto)^{4}	Providence College (ECAC)
198	Anton Stastny (LW)	Czechoslovakia	Philadelphia Flyers	HC Bratislava (Czechoslovakia)
199	Gunnar Persson (D)	Sweden	New York Islanders	Brynäs IF Gävle (Sweden)
200	Gerd Truntschka (C)	West Germany	St. Louis Blues (from Boston)^{5}	EV Cologne (West Germany)
201	Viacheslav Fetisov (D)	Soviet Union	Montreal Canadiens	CSKA Moscow (Russia)

1. The Vancouver Canucks' twelfth-round pick went to the Washington Capitals as the result of a trade on June 15, 1978, that sent cash to Vancouver in exchange for this pick.
2. The Pittsburgh Penguins' twelfth-round pick went to the St. Louis Blues as the result of a trade on June 15, 1978, that sent cash to Pittsburgh in exchange for this pick.
3. The Chicago Black Hawks' twelfth-round pick went to the Philadelphia Flyers as the result of a trade on June 15, 1978, that sent cash to Chicago in exchange for this pick.
4. The Toronto Maple Leafs' twelfth-round pick went to the St. Louis Blues as the result of a trade on June 15, 1978, that sent cash to Toronto in exchange for this pick.
5. The Boston Bruins' twelfth-round pick went to the St. Louis Blues as the result of a trade on June 15, 1978, that sent cash to Boston in exchange for this pick.

=== Round thirteen ===
#	Player	Nationality	NHL team	College/junior/club team
202	Rod Pacholzuk (D)	Canada	Washington Capitals	University of Michigan (WCHA)
203	Viktor Shkurdyuk (RW)	Soviet Union	St. Louis Blues	Leningrad (USSR)
204	Ulf Zetterstrom (LW)	Sweden	Colorado Rockies	Kiruna (Sweden)
205	Carl Bloomberg (G)	United States	St. Louis Blues (from Pittsburgh)^{1}	St. Louis University (CCHA)
206	Chris McLaughlin (D)	United States	New York Rangers	Dartmouth College (ECAC)
207	Terry Kitching (LW)	Canada	St. Louis Blues (from Los Angeles)^{2}	St. Louis University (CCHA)
208	Tom Bailey (RW)	Canada	Detroit Red Wings	Kingston Canadians (OMJHL)
209	Brian O'Connor (D)	United States	St. Louis Blues (from Atlanta)^{3}	Boston University (ECAC)
210	Brian Crombeen (D)	Canada	St. Louis Blues (from Toronto)^{4}	Kingston Canadians (OMJHL)
211	Mike Pidgeon (C)	Canada	St. Louis Blues (from Boston)^{5}	Oshawa Generals (OMJHL)
212	Jeff Mars (RW)	United States	Montreal Canadiens	University of Michigan (WCHA)

1. The Pittsburgh Penguins' thirteenth-round pick went to the St. Louis Blues as the result of a trade on June 15, 1978, that sent cash to Pittsburgh in exchange for this pick.
2. The Los Angeles Kings' thirteenth-round pick went to the St. Louis Blues as the result of a trade on June 15, 1978, that sent cash to Los Angeles in exchange for this pick.
3. The Atlanta Flames' thirteenth-round pick went to the St. Louis Blues as the result of a trade on June 15, 1978, that sent cash to Atlanta in exchange for this pick.
4. The Toronto Maple Leafs' thirteenth-round pick went to the St. Louis Blues as the result of a trade on June 15, 1978, that sent cash to Toronto in exchange for this pick.
5. The Boston Bruins' thirteenth-round pick went to the St. Louis Blues as the result of a trade on June 15, 1978, that sent cash to Boston in exchange for this pick.

=== Round fourteen ===
#	Player	Nationality	NHL team	College/junior/club team
213	Wes Jarvis (C)	Canada	Washington Capitals	Windsor Spitfires (OMJHL)
214	John Cochrane (RW)	United States	St. Louis Blues	Harvard University (ECAC)
215	Ray Irwin (D)	Canada	Washington Capitals (from Colorado)^{1}	Oshawa Generals (OMJHL)
216	Joe Casey (D)	United States	St. Louis Blues (from Pittsburgh)^{2}	Boston College (ECAC)
217	Todd Johnson (C)	United States	New York Rangers	Boston University (ECAC)
218	Jim Farrell (C)	United States	St. Louis Blues (from Los Angeles)^{3}	Princeton University (ECAC)
219	Larry Lozinski (G)	Canada	Detroit Red Wings	Flin-Flon Bombers (WCHL)
220	Frank Johnson (D)	United States	St. Louis Blues (from Atlanta)^{4}	Providence College (ECAC)
221	Blair Wheeler (D)	Canada	St. Louis Blues (from Toronto)^{5}	Yale University (ECAC)
222	Greg Tignanelli (LW)	United States	Montreal Canadiens	Northern Michigan University (CCHA)

1. The Colorado Rockies' fourteenth-round pick went to the Washington Capitals as the result of a trade on June 15, 1978, that sent cash to Colorado in exchange for this pick.
2. The Pittsburgh Penguins' fourteenth-round pick went to the St. Louis Blues as the result of a trade on June 15, 1978, that sent cash to Pittsburgh in exchange for this pick.
3. The Los Angeles Kings' fourteenth-round pick went to the St. Louis Blues as the result of a trade on June 15, 1978, that sent cash to Los Angeles in exchange for this pick.
4. The Atlanta Flames' fourteenth-round pick went to the St. Louis Blues as the result of a trade on June 15, 1978, that sent cash to Atlanta in exchange for this pick.
5. The Toronto Maple Leafs' fourteenth-round pick went to the St. Louis Blues as the result of a trade on June 15, 1978, that sent cash to Toronto in exchange for this pick.

=== Round fifteen ===
#	Player	Nationality	NHL team	College/junior/club team
223	Dan McCarthy (C)	Canada	New York Rangers	Sudbury Wolves (OMJHA)
224	Randy Betty (LW)	Canada	Detroit Red Wings	New Westminster Bruins (WCHL)
225	George Goulakos (LW)	Canada	Montreal Canadiens	St. Lawrence University (ECAC)

=== Round sixteen ===
#	Player	Nationality	NHL team	College/junior/club team
226	Brian Crawley (D)	Canada	Detroit Red Wings	St. Lawrence University (ECAC)
227	Ken Moodie (RW)	Canada	Montreal Canadiens	Colgate University (ECAC)

=== Round seventeen ===
#	Player	Nationality	NHL team	College/junior/club team
228	Doug Feasby (C)	Canada	Detroit Red Wings	Toronto Marlboros (OMJHL)
229	Serge LeBlanc (D)	Canada	Montreal Canadiens	University of Vermont (ECAC)

=== Round eighteen ===
#	Player	Nationality	NHL team	College/junior/club team
230	Bob Magnuson (C)	United States	Montreal Canadiens	Merrimack College (ECAC)

=== Round nineteen ===
#	Player	Nationality	NHL team	College/junior/club team
231	Chris Nilan (RW)	United States	Montreal Canadiens	Northeastern University (ECAC)

=== Round twenty ===
#	Player	Nationality	NHL team	College/junior/club team
232	Rick Wilson (G)	Canada	Montreal Canadiens	St. Lawrence University (ECAC)

=== Round twenty-one ===
#	Player	Nationality	NHL team	College/junior/club team
233	Louis Sleigher (RW)	Canada	Montreal Canadiens	Chicoutimi Saguenéens (QMJHL)

=== Round twenty-two ===
#	Player	Nationality	NHL team	College/junior/club team
234	Doug Robb (RW)	Canada	Montreal Canadiens	Billings Bighorns (WCHL)

= NHL All-Star team ·	= NHL All-Star ·	= NHL All-Star and NHL All-Star team ·	= Hall of Famers

== Draftees based on nationality ==
Rank	Country	Amount
	North America	217
1	Canada	170
2	United States	47
	Europe	17
3	Sweden	8
4	Czechoslovakia	2
4	Finland	2
4	Soviet Union	2
4	West Germany	2
5	Norway	1
