= Ulf Zetterström =

Swedish ice hockey player

- Born: 12 April 1958 (age 68) Kiruna, Sweden
- Position: Left wing
- Played for: Elitserien; HV71; Leksands IF
- NHL draft: 204th overall, 1978; Colorado Rockies
- Playing career: 1977–1988

Ulf Zetterström (born 12 April 1958) is a Swedish former professional ice hockey player. He was selected by the Colorado Rockies in the 13th round (204th overall) of the 1978 NHL Amateur Draft.

Zetterström made his Elitserien debut playing with HV71 during the 1979–80. He also played in the Elitserien with Leksands IF from 1981 to 1983.

From 2008 to 2011, he was the general manager for IF Sundsvall Hockey of the Swedish Allsvenskan.
