= Randy Johnston (ice hockey) =

Canadian ice hockey player

- Born: June 2, 1958 (age 66); Brampton, Ontario, Canada
- Height: 6 ft 0 in (183 cm)
- Weight: 190 lb (86 kg; 13 st 8 lb)
- Position: Defence
- Shot: Left
- Played for: New York Islanders
- NHL draft: 34th overall, 1978; New York Islanders
- Playing career: 1978–1983

Randy John Johnston (born June 2, 1958) is a Canadian former professional ice hockey player who played four games in the National Hockey League for the New York Islanders during the 1979–80 season.

== Playing career ==
Johnston was born in Brampton, Ontario. He played junior hockey for the Peterborough Petes from 1975 to 1978. The Islanders chose him in the second round of the 1978 NHL Amateur Draft. He joined the Fort Worth Texans for the 1978–79 season. In the 1979–80 season Johnston moved to the Indianapolis Checkers. That season, Johnston joined the Islanders for four games. It was his only NHL experience and he remained in the Islanders' system until he retired in 1983.

== Career statistics ==
=== Regular season and playoffs ===
			Regular season					Playoffs
Season	Team	League	GP	G	A	Pts	PIM	GP	G	A	Pts	PIM
1975–76	Peterborough Petes	OMJHL	46	0	5	5	57	—	—	—	—	—
1976–77	Peterborough Petes	OMJHL	66	4	21	25	141	4	0	0	0	8
1977–78	Peterborough Petes	OMJHL	63	4	31	35	79	20	1	4	5	34
1978–79	Fort Worth Texans	CHL	76	3	15	18	80	5	0	0	0	6
1979–80	Indianapolis Checkers	CHL	69	3	27	30	45	7	1	0	1	18
1979–80	New York Islanders	NHL	4	0	0	0	4	—	—	—	—	—
1980–81	Indianapolis Checkers	CHL	76	3	20	23	69	5	0	0	0	6
1981–82	Indianapolis Checkers	CHL	78	7	34	41	71	11	1	5	6	17
1982–83	Indianapolis Checkers	CHL	66	2	15	17	63	10	1	2	3	16
CHL totals			365	18	111	129	328	38	3	7	10	63
NHL totals			4	0	0	0	4	—	—	—	—	—
