= Dean Turner (ice hockey) =

American ice hockey player (born 1958)

- Born: June 22, 1958 (age 68) Dearborn, Michigan, U.S.
- Height: 6 ft 2 in (188 cm)
- Weight: 216 lb (98 kg; 15 st 6 lb)
- Position: Defense
- Shot: Left
- Played for: New York Rangers; Colorado Rockies; Los Angeles Kings
- NHL draft: 44th overall, 1978; New York Rangers
- Playing career: 1978–1983

Dean Turner (born June 22, 1958) is an American former professional ice hockey defenseman who played 35 games in the National Hockey League (NHL) for the Colorado Rockies, New York Rangers, and Los Angeles Kings.

== Career statistics ==
			Regular season					Playoffs
Season	Team	League	GP	G	A	Pts	PIM	GP	G	A	Pts	PIM
1975–76	Detroit Little Caesars	GLJHL	50	34	34	68	—	—	—	—	—	—
1976–77	University of Michigan	B-10	45	13	18	31	106	—	—	—	—	—
1977–78	University of Michigan	B-10	36	5	14	19	88	—	—	—	—	—
1978–79	New York Rangers	NHL	1	0	0	0	0	—	—	—	—	—
1978–79	New Haven Nighthawks	AHL	76	9	25	34	275	6	0	0	0	9
1979–80	New Haven Nighthawks	AHL	6	1	3	4	10	—	—	—	—	—
1979–80	Colorado Rockies	NHL	27	1	0	1	51	—	—	—	—	—
1979–80	Fort Worth Texans	CHL	39	5	23	28	81	15	0	5	5	39
1980–81	Colorado Rockies	NHL	4	0	0	0	4	—	—	—	—	—
1980–81	Fort Worth Texans	CHL	44	5	9	14	103	—	—	—	—	—
1980–81	Springfield Indians	AHL	11	2	7	9	31	6	4	5	9	7
1981–82	Rochester Americans	AHL	75	8	46	54	155	9	0	4	4	6
1982–83	Los Angeles Kings	NHL	3	0	0	0	4	—	—	—	—	—
1982–83	New Haven Nighthawks	AHL	66	14	20	34	129	12	2	3	5	34
AHL totals			234	34	101	135	600	33	6	12	18	56
NHL totals			35	1	0	1	59	—	—	—	—	—
