= Joe Ward (ice hockey) =

Canadian ice hockey player (born 1961)

- Born: February 11, 1961 (age 65) Sarnia, Ontario, Canada
- Height: 6 ft 0 in (183 cm)
- Weight: 179 lb (81 kg; 12 st 11 lb)
- Position: Centre
- Shot: Left
- Played for: Colorado Rockies
- NHL draft: 22nd overall, 1980; Colorado Rockies
- Playing career: 1981–1984

Joseph Michael Ward (born February 11, 1961) is a former Canadian ice hockey player. Ward played his junior hockey with the Seattle Breakers of the WHL, and was the 22nd pick by the Colorado Rockies in the 1980 NHL entry draft. He played just four games for the Rockies that year, however, and he never made it back to the NHL. He is the son of Don Ward.

== Career statistics ==
=== Regular season and playoffs ===
			Regular season					Playoffs
Season	Team	League	GP	G	A	Pts	PIM	GP	G	A	Pts	PIM
1978–79	Seattle Breakers	WHL	61	18	30	48	66	—	—	—	—	—
1979–80	Seattle Breakers	WHL	59	32	37	69	90	10	5	4	9	19
1980–81	Seattle Breakers	WHL	40	28	23	51	48	5	4	0	4	4
1980–81	Colorado Rockies	NHL	4	0	0	0	2	—	—	—	—	—
1980–81	Fort Worth Texans	CHL	—	—	—	—	—	5	2	2	4	2
1981–82	Fort Worth Texans	CHL	32	6	15	21	12	—	—	—	—	—
1982–83	Wichita Wind	CHL	7	0	2	2	2	—	—	—	—	—
1982–83	Muskegon Mohawks	IHL	53	34	25	59	4	4	1	2	3	4
1983–84	Muskegon Mohawks	IHL	9	3	2	5	2	—	—	—	—	—
NHL totals			4	0	0	0	2	—	—	—	—	—
