= Gord Wappel =

Canadian ice hockey player

- Born: July 26, 1958 (age 67) Regina, Saskatchewan, Canada
- Height: 6 ft 0 in (183 cm)
- Weight: 205 lb (93 kg; 14 st 9 lb)
- Position: Defence
- Shot: Left
- Played for: Atlanta Flames; Calgary Flames
- NHL draft: 80th overall, 1978; Atlanta Flames
- Playing career: 1978–1983

Gordon Alexander Wappel (born July 26, 1958) is a Canadian former professional ice hockey defenceman who played 20 National Hockey League games for the Atlanta/Calgary Flames from 1979 until 1982. He scored one goal and one assist in his NHL career. Wappel was a fifth round selection of the Flames in the 1978 NHL entry draft. He retired following the 1982–83 season.

== Career statistics ==
=== Regular season and playoffs ===
			Regular season					Playoffs
Season	Team	League	GP	G	A	Pts	PIM	GP	G	A	Pts	PIM
1973–74	Regina Pat Blues	SJHL	50	2	4	6	55	—	—	—	—	—
1974–75	Regina Pat Blues	SJHL	25	5	5	10	55	—	—	—	—	—
1974–75	Regina Pats	WCHL	20	0	3	3	9	5	0	0	0	4
1975–76	Regina Pats	WCHL	72	5	28	33	76	6	0	2	2	28
1976–77	Regina Pats	WCHL	54	4	28	32	137	—	—	—	—	—
1977–78	Regina Pats	WCHL	72	10	30	40	177	13	5	5	10	20
1978–79	Tulsa Oilers	CHL	47	1	16	17	44	—	—	—	—	—
1978–79	Muskegon Mohawks	IHL	20	2	6	8	40	—	—	—	—	—
1979–80	Birmingham Bulls	CHL	76	4	20	24	122	—	—	—	—	—
1979–80	Atlanta Flames	NHL	2	0	0	0	0	2	0	0	0	4
1980–81	Birmingham Bulls	CHL	44	6	19	25	89	—	—	—	—	—
1980–81	Nova Scotia Voyageurs	AHL	18	0	4	4	16	6	0	1	1	8
1980–81	Calgary Flames	NHL	7	0	1	1	4	—	—	—	—	—
1981–82	Oklahoma City Stars	CHL	46	6	13	19	52	—	—	—	—	—
1981–82	Calgary Flames	NHL	11	1	0	1	6	—	—	—	—	—
1982–83	Colorado Flames	CHL	70	10	34	44	110	6	0	8	8	2
CHL totals			283	27	102	129	417	6	0	8	8	2
NHL totals			20	1	1	2	10	2	0	0	0	4
