= Dave Watson (ice hockey) =

Canadian ice hockey player

- Born: May 19, 1958 (age 67) Kirkland Lake, Ontario, Canada
- Height: 6 ft 2 in (188 cm)
- Weight: 190 lb (86 kg; 13 st 8 lb)
- Position: Forward
- Played for: Colorado Rockies
- NHL draft: 58th overall, 1978; Colorado Rockies
- Playing career: 1979–1986

David Gerald Watson (born May 19, 1958) is a Canadian former professional ice hockey forward who played 18 games in the National Hockey League for the Colorado Rockies.

== Career statistics ==
=== Regular season and playoffs ===
			Regular season					Playoffs
Season	Team	League	GP	G	A	Pts	PIM	GP	G	A	Pts	PIM
1976–77	Sudbury Wolves	OMJHL	39	12	13	25	34	—	—	—	—	—
1976–77	Sault Ste. Marie Greyhounds	OMJHL	26	11	9	20	18	6	0	3	3	6
1977–78	Sault Ste. Marie Greyhounds	OMJHL	65	21	30	51	112	13	5	3	8	8
1979–80	Colorado Rockies	NHL	5	0	0	0	2	—	—	—	—	—
1979–80	Fort Worth Texans	CHL	68	19	22	41	124	14	4	6	10	14
1980–81	Colorado Rockies	NHL	13	0	1	1	8	—	—	—	—	—
1980–81	Fort Worth Texans	CHL	50	16	20	36	115	—	—	—	—	—
1981–82	Fort Worth Texans	CHL	68	15	14	29	107	—	—	—	—	—
1982–83	Carolina Thunderbirds	ACHL	66	53	49	102	101	8	6	8	14	28
1983–84	Carolina Thunderbirds	ACHL	29	17	16	33	56	10	4	4	8	13
1985–85	Carolina Thunderbirds	ACHL	64	31	54	85	138	10	3	14	17	26
1985–86	Carolina Thunderbirds	ACHL	9	3	3	6	21	10	1	4	5	16
ACHL totals			168	104	122	226	316	—	—	—	—	—
NHL totals			18	0	1	1	10	—	—	—	—	—
