= Barry Long =

Australian spiritual teacher and writer

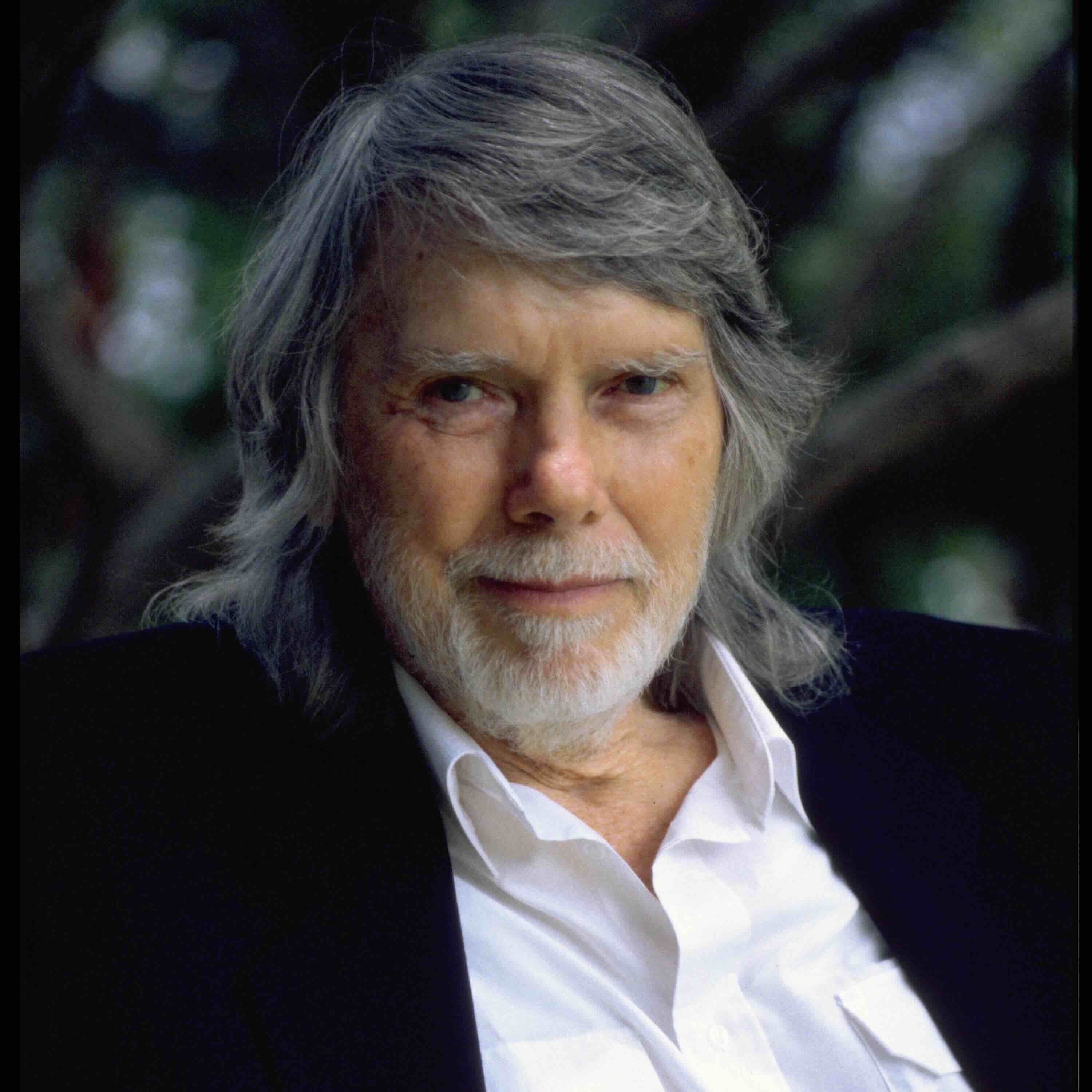
Long in 1997

Barry Long (1 August 1926 – 6 December 2003) was an Australian spiritual teacher and writer.

== Early life ==
Barry Long was born and raised in Australia and had little formal education. In his twenties he became editor of a Sydney Sunday newspaper, The Truth and later press secretary in the New South Wales Parliament. At this time he was married with two children.

== India and mysticism ==
In his early thirties he began to experience a disillusionment with his material life and in 1964 he abandoned everything, including his family, to go to India. There he experienced a spiritual crisis culminating in a self-ascribed "mystic death," which he called his "realisation of immortality," followed four years later by a "transcendental realisation"; a contact with a depth of consciousness from which he stated his knowledge of universal reality ultimately derived.

Leaving India he moved to London, living in Highgate and working as a sub-editor in Fleet Street until he was able to support himself from teaching and publishing. In 1986 he returned to his native Australia, living on Tamborine Mountain, Queensland with his wife Kathy and young stepson, Simon, then in Burleigh Heads, Queensland when they divorced, and finally moving to Crabbes Creek, New South Wales where he lived until his death from prostate cancer in December 2003.

Long stated that he was a tantric master and that unhappiness arises because man and woman have forgotten how to love each other. In 1984 he recorded a double audio cassette Making Love: Sexual Love the Divine Way, later published as a book and CD.

== Public speaking and writing ==
He started his public teaching in England and later went on to teach in Australia and New Zealand, Europe, the US and Canada. His last public seminar was the tenth annual 14-day Master Session held in Queensland, Australia in late October 2002. He continued to write new material after this and his observations on the approach of death were published on his website.

The story of his realisations is told in a book published in July 2013, My Life of Love and Truth: A Spiritual Autobiography which describes his life up until the death of his second wife in 1982. His works are published by the Barry Long Foundation International, based in New South Wales, Australia and his last writings have yet to be published.

== Long's teachings ==
Long's teaching focuses on freeing the individual from unhappiness which he defined as "happy today, unhappy tomorrow". He stated that this fluctuating condition is set in motion and maintained by an addiction to thoughts and the emotions they create. These emotions encourage other thoughts and so a vicious cycle is initiated. We are trapped in this cycle, he suggested, until we follow "the way of truth". It includes:

- constant vigilance in observation of one's thoughts, emotions and actions;
- meditation to still the mind and connect with life within i.e. what "I" call "me"; "feeling the well-being in the body";
- being, without thought; the next step on from meditation;
- getting your life right, taking action in those areas of your life which disturb you because something is wrong.

The sexual aspects of his teaching gained great notoriety, assuming a greater prominence in the public mind than Long wished. He maintained the relationship between man and woman caused the greatest unhappiness in the post-industrial West. He taught and wrote in detail about sexual love between man and woman and its use to purify them both, ridding them of what he called "personal, human love." He responded to controversy by pointing out that getting one's life right in all its aspects, and prolonged selfless giving were more important. He suggested that a person practicing this would naturally attract a loving sexual partner. In response to an article by Andrew Cohen he wrote "One notion I would like to correct is where you say that in my teaching "the primary spiritual practice is making love rightly." The primary spiritual practice... is self-denial, giving and honesty practiced over a long period out of an inner perception of rightness and goodness."

Long also wrote about many other aspects of "Love, Life, Truth, God and Death". In The Origins of Man and the Universe he presents his cosmology. Speaking of this book he stated, "There's so much in this book ....it's like a base which my whole teaching goes back to, or extends from. My current teaching might be more refined, but is always consistent with it." He taught and spoke about family life and the importance of raising children from birth in justice and truth not just love. In response to the September 2001 terrorist attacks in the US, an extract on terrorism from his Origins book written in 1983 was published separately as well as a new book A Prayer for Life: The Cause and Cure of Terrorism, War and Human Suffering.

== Influences ==
Barry Long acknowledged his respect for J. Krishnamurti and his teachings, nonetheless he considered himself to be an original teacher.

He recommended abandoning religious tradition in favour of direct experience and asked his audience not to believe anything he said, but to listen for the "ring of truth" in it.

He himself had an influence on a number of other teachers, writers and therapists. The most prominent of these is Eckhart Tolle, author of The Power of Now, who met him in person and is on record as saying he loved Barry Long's teaching.

== Marital and relationship history ==
Long married or lived monogamously with five women; Betty, his first wife; Julie, whom he married in England and lived with for 13 years until her death from cancer; Kathy with whom he moved to Australia with his stepson Simon; Jade who was his partner when he was travelling the world and then Sara, who was with him when he died.

His marital and relationship history was described by Clive Tempest in the foreword to Making Love: Sexual Love The Divine Way as such: "All this time Barry Long's love of woman has remained constant. She is always by his side. Through deep and lasting partnerships he has made his realisations of love real in the midst of everyday living."

== Partial bibliography ==
- The Origins of Man and the Universe (1st edition Routledge & Kegan Paul 1984) ISBN 0-7102-0337-3 (Barry Long Books, revised edition 1998) ISBN 1-899324-12-7, (excerpts)
- Meditation: A Foundation Course, (The Barry Long Foundation, 1996) ISBN 1-899324-00-3
- Stillness Is the Way (Barry Long Books, 1996) ISBN 0-9508050-4-1
- Knowing Yourself: The True in the False (Barry Long Books, 1996) ISBN 1-899324-03-8 (excerpt)
- Only Fear Dies (Barry Long Books, 1996) ISBN 0-9508050-7-6 (excerpt)
- To Woman in Love: A Book of Letters (Barry Long Books, 1996) ISBN 0-9508050-8-4
- Making Love: Sexual Love the Divine Way (Barry Long Books, revised edition 1998) ISBN 1-899324-14-3 (excerpt)
- Raising Children in Love, Justice and Truth (Barry Long Books, 1998) ISBN 1-899324-13-5
- To Man in Truth: Enlightening Letters (Barry Long Books, 1999) ISBN 1-899324-15-1 (excerpt)
- The Way In: A Book of Self-Discovery (Barry Long Books, 2000) ISBN 0-9508050-5-X (excerpt)
- A Prayer for Life: The Cause and Cure of Terrorism, War and Human Suffering, (Barry Long Books, 2002) ISBN 1-899324-17-8
- Where the Spirit Speaks to its Own: The Passion of Spiritual Awakening, (Barry Long Books, 2003) ISBN 1-899324-16-X (excerpts)
- Start Meditating Now, How to stop thinking (audiobook – Barry Long Books 2007) ISBN 1-899324-20-8
- A Journey in Consciousness, Exploring the truth behind existence (audiobook – Barry Long Books 2007) ISBN 1-899324-21-6
- Seeing through Death, Facing the fact without fear (audiobook – Barry Long Books 2007) ISBN 1-899324-22-4
- Making Love, Sexual love the divine way (audiobook – Barry Long Books 2007) ISBN 1-899324-23-2
- How to Live Joyously, Being true to the law of life (audiobook – Barry Long Books 2007) ISBN 1-899324-24-0
- Behind Life and Death; The Boundless Reality, (The Barry Long Foundation 2008) ISBN 978-1-899324-18-7 (excerpt)
- My Life of Love and Truth: A Spiritual Autobiography (The Barry Long Foundation 2013) ISBN 978-1-899324-19-4
- From Here to Reality: My Spiritual Teaching (Barry Long Books 2015) ISBN 978-1-899324-31-6
- Right Meditation: Five steps to reality (Barry Long Books 2024) ISBN 978-1-899324-50-7
