= Mike Gillis =

Canadian ice hockey player (born 1958)

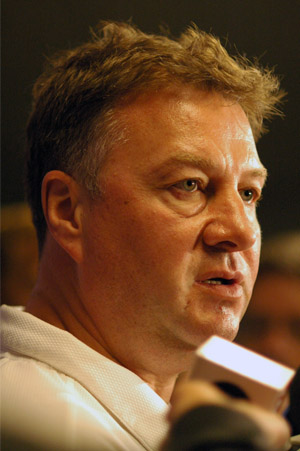
- Gillis in 2009
- Born: December 1, 1958 (age 67) Sudbury, Ontario, Canada
- Height: 6 ft 1 in (185 cm)
- Weight: 195 lb (88 kg; 13 st 13 lb)
- Position: Left wing
- Shot: Left
- Played for: Colorado Rockies; Boston Bruins
- NHL draft: 5th overall, 1978; Colorado Rockies
- Playing career: 1978–1984

Michael David Gillis (born December 1, 1958) is a Canadian former professional ice hockey player and former president and general manager of the Vancouver Canucks. He was born in Sudbury, Ontario.

== Playing career ==
Gillis spent his junior hockey career with the Kingston Canadians of the Ontario Major Junior Hockey League (OMJHL) from 1975 to 1978, playing in 111 games and scoring 132 points (39 goals and 93 assists). He added on 18 points (four goals and 14 assists) in 12 playoff games. Gillis missed most of the 1976–77 season due to a leg injury. He was then drafted in the first round, fifth overall, by the Colorado Rockies in the 1978 NHL entry draft.

In the 1978–79 season, Gillis played two games with the Philadelphia Firebirds of the American Hockey League (AHL), scoring no points; he also spent 30 games with the Rockies, earning eight points (one goal and seven assists). He split the 1979–80 season with the Rockies, scoring four goals and five assists in 40 games, and the Fort Worth Texans of the CHL, with 22 points (nine goals and 13 assists) in 29 games. Gillis started the 1980–81 season with Colorado, and had 18 points in 51 games before being sent to the Boston Bruins for Bob Miller. Gillis then scored six points in 17 games for a total of 24 points, which would be his career high. Gillis also appeared in a playoff game, going pointless.

In 1981–82, Gillis then registered 17 points in 53 games, and earned three points (1G-2A) in 11 playoff games. He spent the majority of the 1982–83 season with the Baltimore Skipjacks of the AHL, getting 113 points (32 goals and 81 assists) in 74 games, good for fourth in AHL scoring. He also played five games with Boston, earning an assist, then played 12 playoff games for the Bruins, earning four points. Gillis split the 1983–84 season with the Bruins, scoring 17 points in 50 games, and with the Hershey Bears of the AHL, getting 29 points in 26 games. He played three playoff games with Boston, getting no points.

Gillis retired from professional hockey in the summer of 1984.

== Post-playing career ==
=== Agent ===
Upon retiring from playing hockey, Gillis coached the Queen's University Golden Gaels hockey team in 1985–86. He then earned a law degree from Queen's University in 1990 and became a player agent. His clientele over the years included Pavel Bure, Markus Näslund, Bobby Holík, and Mike Richter, among others.

In 1997, Gillis successfully sued former National Hockey League Players' Association executive director Alan Eagleson for $570,000 for stealing a portion of his disability insurance. The charges were among many against Eagleson uncovered by Russ Conway.

=== General manager ===
With the firing of Vancouver Canucks general manager Dave Nonis at the end of the 2007–08 season, Gillis was introduced by the organization as Nonis' successor on April 23, 2008. Entering into the free agent market as a general manager for the first time in July 2008, Gillis made immediate changes. He chose not to re-sign former client and longtime Canucks captain Markus Näslund, or forward Brendan Morrison. He then made an aggressive pitch for unrestricted free agent center Mats Sundin with a two-year, $20 million offer; the deal would have made him the highest paid player in the NHL. Sundin decided against signing with any team until midway through the subsequent season, but eventually accepted a one-year, pro-rated $8.6 million offer on December 18, 2008. Several months later, before the 2008–09 NHL trade deadline, Gillis re-signed emerging forward Alexandre Burrows to a four-year, $8 million contract on March 3, 2009, substantially raising his previous $525,000 annual salary. Burrows was, at the time, in the midst of a career-season in which he scored 28 goals and 51 points, only to follow up with a career season the next year by scoring 35 goals and 67 points.

After winning a Northwest Division title and making it as far as Game 6 of the second round in the 2009 Stanley Cup playoffs, Gillis continued to re-sign key players. With the Canucks' leading scorers Daniel and Henrik Sedin set to become unrestricted free agents on July 1, 2009, Gillis flew to Sweden to negotiate with the twins, ultimately signing them to identical five-year, $30.5 million deals hours before the free agency period was set to begin. Soon thereafter, negotiations began with star goaltender Roberto Luongo, who was entering the final year of his original four-year deal with the Canucks. Several days after Luongo gave the Canucks a September 13 deadline to come to an agreement before ceasing negotiations for the upcoming season, Gillis signed him to a 12-year, $64 million contract extension on September 2. Other significant signings in the 2009 off-season included unrestricted free agent Mikael Samuelsson from the Detroit Red Wings and Canucks prospect Sergei Shirokov from the Kontinental Hockey League (KHL).

Gillis' first noteworthy trade occurred on August 28, 2009, when he sent prospect forwards Patrick White and Daniel Rahimi to the San Jose Sharks in exchange for defencemen Christian Ehrhoff and Brad Lukowich. Of the two defencemen acquired, the younger Ehrhoff proved to be the centrepiece of the deal. San Jose's primary motivation to send him away was to clear salary cap space in anticipation of their acquisition of star forward Dany Heatley from the Ottawa Senators. For the Canucks, Ehrhoff's acquisition addressed the need for a puck-moving defenceman to move play out of the defensive zone. Ehrhoff went on to lead the Canucks defencemen in scoring that season.

In the midst of Gillis' off-season transactions, the Canucks were involved in a pair of tampering incidents with Toronto Maple Leafs management. The first incident occurred in late June 2009, when Maple Leafs head coach Ron Wilson publicized the club's intentions to pursue the Sedin twins if Gillis could not re-sign them before the free agency period began. Several months later, in September, a Leafs TV documentary program covering June's 2009 NHL entry draft featured Toronto general manager Brian Burke indicating that Gillis had pursued the Tampa Bay Lightning's second overall pick for a package consisting of defenceman Kevin Bieksa, forward Alexandre Burrows and their first-round selection. Although the segment was eventually pulled off-air, Gillis filed tampering charges against the Maple Leafs near the beginning of the 2009–10 season for both incidents. The NHL fined Wilson US$10,000 for his part in tampering with the Sedins, while Burke and the Leafs management were given a warning for the draft incident. That season, the Canucks went on to win the Northwest Division title, but lost in the second round to the Chicago Blackhawks in the 2010 playoffs, both for the second consecutive year under Gillis.

In the 2010 off-season, Gillis made significant defensive acquisitions, trading for Keith Ballard from the Florida Panthers (in exchange for a first-round draft pick Michael Grabner and Steve Bernier) and signing Dan Hamhuis ($27 million over six years). Gillis also signed third-line centre Manny Malhotra. While Hamhuis and Malhotra became integral parts of the Canucks' successful season in 2010–11, Ballard struggled to remain in the lineup with injuries and numerous bouts of healthy scratches. Meanwhile, Grabner became a Calder Memorial Trophy nominee that season as the NHL's top rookie. In goal, Gillis had re-signed prospect Cory Schneider in the off-season, as well. Backing up Roberto Luongo as a rookie, the duo won the William M. Jennings Trophy as the goaltending tandem with the fewest goals against in the League. Gillis' transactions were instrumental in the Canucks' first Presidents' Trophy, leading the NHL with the best regular season record in 2010–11, and he was personally awarded with the League's inaugural NHL General Manager of the Year Award. On April 27, 2011, a day after the Canucks won Game 7 of the first round of the 2011 playoffs in overtime to eliminate the defending Stanley Cup champion Chicago Blackhawks, Gillis was fined an undisclosed amount after making negative comments about the refs in Game 6 three days prior where the Blackhawks defeated the Canucks 4–3 in overtime to force a seventh game as he most notably was expressing displeasure at the lack of a penalty call on Blackhawks' forward Bryan Bickell in the overtime period after a questionable hit on Canuck' defenseman Kevin Bieksa that left Bieksa dazed but not injured. The Canucks would go on to defeat the Nashville Predators and San Jose Sharks in the next two rounds to advance all the way to the 2011 Stanley Cup Finals, where they fell to the Boston Bruins in seven games after taking a 3–2 series lead. It has been noted, however, that the players arguably most instrumental in their Finals appearance — the Sedin twins, Ryan Kesler, Alexandre Burrows, Alexander Edler, Roberto Luongo and Cory Schneider — were already in the Canucks' organization when Gillis took over as general manager from his predecessor, Dave Nonis.

In the 2011–12 season, the Canucks defended their Presidents' Trophy title, but lost to the eighth-seeded (and eventual Cup champions) Los Angeles Kings in five games during the opening round of the playoffs. That season saw Cory Schneider usurp Roberto Luongo as the team's starting goaltender. Luongo started the first two games due to Schneider's injury and played well but his team lost both. Head Coach Alain Vigneault opted to start Schneider for the rest of the series in order to give the Canucks some momentum, and Luongo remained on the bench for the remainder of the series as the Kings won four games to one. Dressing as a backup for the Canucks' final three playoff games led many in the media to believe that Luongo would be traded in the off-season, in favour of Schneider, who recorded stronger regular season and playoff statistics than him in 2011–12. Asked about his role with the Canucks following the defeat, Luongo told reporters that he would waive his no-trade clause if management asked him to do so. In June 2012, Schneider was signed to a three-year, $12 million contract, which made Luongo expendable, but Gillis' efforts to trade Luongo were unsuccessful due to his hefty US$64 million, 12-year contract, a contract that Gillis has since been criticized for negotiating.

In the 2012–13 season, which was shortened by a lockout, the Canucks finished with a record of 26–15–7 and won the Northwest Division title. However, they were eliminated in four-straight games by the San Jose Sharks during the opening round of the playoffs, the second consecutive first round playoff exit. Gillis was criticized by The Globe and Mail's Allan Maki as he "dithered with goalie Roberto Luongo and should have traded him for help at forward but didn’t. Instead, Gillis acquired Derek Roy at the trade deadline and thought that was enough. Gillis’s decision to get Zack Kassian doesn’t look good, either, but the GM will survive." Maki said that the "team, with its aging core and limited prospects, is in need of new direction, new leadership. It’s that time," just two years after its Stanley Cup Finals appearance. Afterwards, Gillis fired Head Coach Alain Vigneault, Associate Coach Rick Bowness and Assistant Coach Newell Brown. Gillis also continued to try to trade Luongo, who still had nine years left on his 12-year contract, which represented a $5.33 million annual salary cap hit.

John Tortorella was hired to replace Vigneault as head coach, a decision that Gillis later suggested had been at the insistence of Canucks Owner Francesco Aquilini. At the 2013 NHL entry draft, Gillis traded goaltender Cory Schneider to the New Jersey Devils for the ninth overall draft pick, which he subsequently used to draft Bo Horvat from the London Knights. Gillis took a lot of criticism from fans and season-ticket holders, as the Canucks did poorly and slid out of playoff contention during the latter half of the 2013–14 season. Gillis was questioned on his personnel moves, such as trading Roberto Luongo to the Florida Panthers, which, combined with the earlier Schneider trade, had left the team without a proven number one goaltender, instead relying on the largely untested Eddie Läck.

On April 8, 2014, Gillis was relieved of his duties as president and GM of the Vancouver Canucks by owner Francesco Aquilini; Aquilini had been said to be very hands-on in day-to-day management of the club. This came right after the Canucks were eliminated from the 2014 playoffs, and as season ticket renewal levels had dropped off. Gillis was succeeded by former Canucks captain Trevor Linden, who was hired the next day as president of hockey operations. It had been reported that Gillis and Linden had such a poor relationship that Linden stayed away from the Canucks after retiring as a player.

Prior to his dismissal as Canucks president and general manager, Gillis admitted that significant roster changes were necessary in order to keep the Canucks in long-term playoff contention. Though the organization had already moved on from Luongo and Schneider for long term assets, Gillis was reportedly pushing for further drastic changes; this included moving center Ryan Kesler to the Anaheim Ducks for two first round picks in the 2014 NHL entry draft, and winger Alex Burrows for an addition first round pick from the Philadelphia Flyers. Including Vancouver's own sixth-overall selection in 2014, these transactions would have given the Canucks four selections in the first round, with the hope that all four draftees would have been NHL-ready by 2016. Gillis was fired before either transaction came to fruition, with the proposed Kesler trade notably having been rejected by Francesco Aquilini; despite this, Kesler was traded to the Ducks on the day of the 2014 draft, but for a significantly inferior return.

== Personal ==
Gillis is the brother of Paul Gillis. He is the uncle of professional hockey players Matt and Adam Pelech.

Gillis went on to teaching at the University of Victoria after his dismissal from the Vancouver Canucks. From July 2021 to December 2023, he consulted with the NHLPA on business development.

== Career statistics ==
			Regular season					Playoffs
Season	Team	League	GP	G	A	Pts	PIM	GP	G	A	Pts	PIM
1975–76	Kingston Canadians	OMJHL	64	16	45	61	34	7	1	2	3	11
1976–77	Kingston Canadians	OMJHL	4	2	2	4	4	—	—	—	—	—
1977–78	Kingston Canadians	OMJHL	43	21	46	67	86	5	3	12	15	0
1978–79	Colorado Rockies	NHL	30	1	7	8	6	—	—	—	—	—
1978–79	Philadelphia Firebirds	AHL	2	0	0	0	0	—	—	—	—	—
1979–80	Colorado Rockies	NHL	40	4	5	9	22	—	—	—	—	—
1979–80	Fort Worth Texans	CHL	29	9	13	22	43	—	—	—	—	—
1980–81	Colorado Rockies	NHL	51	11	7	18	54	—	—	—	—	—
1980–81	Boston Bruins	NHL	17	2	4	6	15	1	0	0	0	0
1981–82	Boston Bruins	NHL	53	9	8	17	54	11	1	2	3	6
1982–83	Boston Bruins	NHL	5	0	1	1	0	12	1	3	4	2
1982–83	Baltimore Skipjacks	AHL	74	32	81	113	33	—	—	—	—	—
1983–84	Boston Bruins	NHL	50	6	11	17	35	3	0	0	0	2
1983–84	Hershey Bears	AHL	26	8	21	29	13	—	—	—	—	—
NHL totals			246	33	43	76	186	27	2	5	7	10
AHL totals			102	40	102	142	46	—	—	—	—	—

Preceded by Barry Beck	Colorado Rockies first-round draft pick 1978	Succeeded by Rob Ramage
Preceded by Dave Nonis	General manager of the Vancouver Canucks; 2008–14	Succeeded by Jim Benning
