= Kevin Krook =

Canadian ice hockey player (born 1958)

- Born: April 5, 1958 (age 67) Cold Lake, Alberta, Canada
- Height: 5 ft 11 in (180 cm)
- Weight: 190 lb (86 kg; 13 st 8 lb)
- Position: Defence
- Shot: Left
- Played for: Colorado Rockies
- NHL draft: 142nd overall, 1978; Colorado Rockies
- Playing career: 1978–1979

Kevin Bradley Krook (born April 5, 1958) is a Canadian former professional ice hockey defenceman. He played three games in the National Hockey League with the Colorado Rockies in the 1978–79 season.

== Regular season and playoffs ==
| | | | Regular season | | | | | Playoffs |
| Season | Team | League | GP | G | A | Pts | PIM | GP | G | A | Pts | PIM |
|---|---|---|---|---|---|---|---|---|---|---|---|---|
| 1974–75 | Bellingham Blazers | BCJHL | 46 | 18 | 52 | 70 | 250 | — | — | — | — | — |
| 1975–76 | New Westminster Bruins | WCHL | 44 | 0 | 9 | 9 | 17 | 17 | 0 | 1 | 1 | 2 |
| 1976–77 | Calgary Centennials | WCHL | 25 | 2 | 8 | 10 | 18 | — | — | — | — | — |
| 1976–77 | Regina Pats | WCHL | 49 | 5 | 26 | 31 | 118 | — | — | — | — | — |
| 1977–78 | Regina Pats | WCHL | 57 | 8 | 43 | 51 | 203 | 13 | 2 | 11 | 13 | 28 |
| 1978–79 | Muskegon Mohawks | IHL | 39 | 2 | 13 | 15 | 39 | — | — | — | — | — |
| 1978–79 | Colorado Rockies | NHL | 3 | 0 | 0 | 0 | 2 | — | — | — | — | — |
| NHL totals | | | 3 | 0 | 0 | 0 | 2 | — | — | — | — | — |
