= Joe Cirella =

Canadian ice hockey player (born 1963)

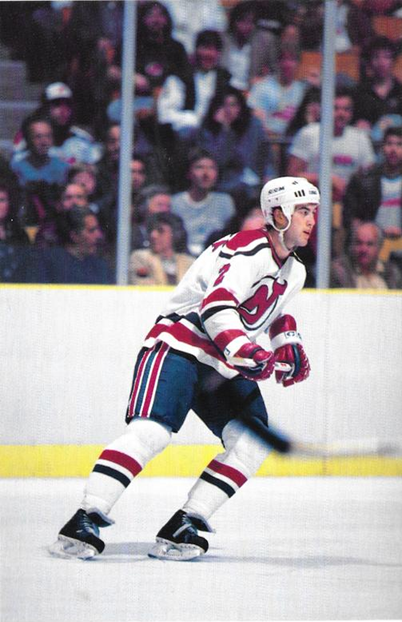
- Born: May 9, 1963 (age 62) Hamilton, Ontario, Canada
- Height: 6 ft 3 in (191 cm)
- Weight: 210 lb (95 kg; 15 st 0 lb)
- Position: Defence
- Shot: Right
- Played for: Colorado Rockies; New Jersey Devils; Quebec Nordiques; New York Rangers; Florida Panthers; Ottawa Senators; Kölner Haie
- NHL draft: 5th overall, 1981; Colorado Rockies
- Playing career: 1981–1997

Joseph Cirella (born May 9, 1963) is a Canadian former professional ice hockey player who played in 828 games in the National Hockey League (NHL). He has additionally served as assistant coach and assistant general manager of the Oshawa Generals of the Ontario Hockey League. Cirella was born in Hamilton, Ontario, but grew up in Stoney Creek, Ontario.

== Playing career ==
Cirella joined the Oshawa Generals of the Ontario Hockey League (OHL) at the age of 17 and served as team captain as the Generals won the J. Ross Robertson Cup as OHL champions in 1983. He was selected fifth overall in the 1981 NHL entry draft by the Colorado Rockies.

He was traded along with Claude Loiselle from the New Jersey Devils to the Quebec Nordiques for Walt Poddubny on June 17, 1989.

Cirella played for the Rockies, Devils, Nordiques, New York Rangers, Florida Panthers and Ottawa Senators during an NHL career that lasted 14 seasons. He scored the first goal, and also registered an assist on the game-winning goal in the 36th National Hockey League All-Star Game, played in his home arena in East Rutherford, New Jersey, in 1984. He was the last former Colorado Rockies player in the NHL at the time of his final game. He retired in 1997 after playing one year in Germany with the Kölner Haie of the Deutsche Eishockey Liga.

== Career statistics ==
=== Regular season and playoffs ===
			Regular season					Playoffs
Season	Team	League	GP	G	A	Pts	PIM	GP	G	A	Pts	PIM
1979–80	Hamilton Tiger Cubs	Midget	21	5	26	31		—	—	—	—	—
1980–81	Oshawa Generals	OHL	56	5	31	36	220	—	—	—	—	—
1981–82	Colorado Rockies	NHL	65	7	12	19	52	—	—	—	—	—
1981–82	Oshawa Generals	OHL	3	0	1	1	10	11	7	10	17	32
1982–83	New Jersey Devils	NHL	2	0	1	1	4	—	—	—	—	—
1982–83	Oshawa Generals	OHL	56	13	55	68	110	17	4	16	20	37
1982–83	Oshawa Generals	MC	—	—	—	—	—	5	3	8	11	10
1983–84	New Jersey Devils	NHL	79	11	33	44	137	—	—	—	—	—
1984–85	New Jersey Devils	NHL	66	6	18	24	143	—	—	—	—	—
1985–86	New Jersey Devils	NHL	66	6	23	29	147	—	—	—	—	—
1986–87	New Jersey Devils	NHL	65	9	22	31	111	—	—	—	—	—
1987–88	New Jersey Devils	NHL	80	8	31	39	191	19	0	7	7	49
1988–89	New Jersey Devils	NHL	80	3	19	22	155	—	—	—	—	—
1989–90	Quebec Nordiques	NHL	56	4	14	18	67	—	—	—	—	—
1990–91	Quebec Nordiques	NHL	39	2	10	12	59	—	—	—	—	—
1990–91	New York Rangers	NHL	19	1	0	1	52	6	0	2	2	26
1991–92	New York Rangers	NHL	67	3	12	15	121	13	0	4	4	23
1992–93	New York Rangers	NHL	55	3	6	9	85	—	—	—	—	—
1993–94	Florida Panthers	NHL	63	1	9	10	99	—	—	—	—	—
1994–95	Florida Panthers	NHL	20	0	1	1	21	—	—	—	—	—
1995–96	Ottawa Senators	NHL	6	0	0	0	4	—	—	—	—	—
1995–96	Milwaukee Admirals	IHL	40	1	8	9	65	5	0	1	1	20
1996–97	Kölner Haie	DEL	49	2	7	9	164	4	0	0	0	8
NHL totals			828	64	211	275	1448	38	0	13	13	98

=== International ===
Year	Team	Event	GP	G	A	Pts	PIM
1983	Canada	WJC	7	0	0	0	6

== Coaching ==
After retiring as a player, Cirella served as an assistant coach with the NHL's Florida Panthers during the 1997-98 season before returning to the Ontario Hockey League where he served in the same capacity with the Oshawa Generals for five seasons. After spending the 2009–10 season in the Peterborough Petes' front office, he returned to the Generals as assistant general manager and assistant coach.

Season	Team	League	Type
1997-98	Florida Panthers	NHL	Assistant Coach
1998-99	Oshawa Generals	OHL	Assistant Coach
1999-00	Oshawa Generals	OHL	Assistant Coach
2000-01	Oshawa Generals	OHL	Assistant Coach
2002-03	Oshawa Generals	OHL	Assistant Coach
2003-04	Oshawa Generals	OHL	Assistant Coach
2009-10	Peterborough Petes	OHL	Defensive Consultant
2010-11	Oshawa Generals	OHL	Assistant Coach/Assistant GM
2012–2013	Sault Ste. Marie Greyhounds	OHL	Assistant Coach
2013–2018	Sault Ste. Marie Greyhounds	OHL	Associate Coach
2018–2022	Stockton Heat	AHL	Assistant Coach
2023–Present	Calgary Wranglers	AHL	Assistant Coach

Preceded by Paul Gagné	Colorado Rockies first-round draft pick 1980	Succeeded by Rocky Trottier
