= Gary Dillon =

Canadian ice hockey player (born 1959)

- Born: February 28, 1959 (age 66); Toronto, Ontario, Canada
- Height: 5 ft 10 in (178 cm)
- Weight: 173 lb (78 kg; 12 st 5 lb)
- Position: Centre
- Shot: Left
- Played for: Colorado Rockies
- NHL draft: 85th overall, 1979; Colorado Rockies
- Playing career: 1979–1982

Gary Kevin Dillon (born February 28, 1959) is a Canadian former professional ice hockey centre who played 13 games in the National Hockey League with the Colorado Rockies. His brother, Wayne Dillon, also played in the NHL. As a youth, he played in the 1972 Quebec International Pee-Wee Hockey Tournament with a minor ice hockey team from Dorset Park, Toronto.

== Career statistics ==
=== Regular season and playoffs ===
			Regular season					Playoffs
Season	Team	League	GP	G	A	Pts	PIM	GP	G	A	Pts	PIM
1974–75	Markham Waxers	OPJHL	31	26	29	55	46	—	—	—	—	—
1975–76	Toronto Marlboros	OMJHL	60	23	46	69	68	10	2	9	11	45
1976–77	Toronto Marlboros	OMJHL	64	40	62	102	77	6	2	3	5	6
1977–78	Toronto Marlboros	OMJHL	64	39	45	84	112	5	2	1	3	38
1978–79	Toronto Marlboros	OMJHL	59	57	63	120	40	3	0	0	0	2
1979–80	Fort Worth Texans	CHL	77	30	26	56	34	15	8	9	17	2
1980–81	Colorado Rockies	NHL	13	1	1	2	29	—	—	—	—	—
1980–81	Fort Worth Texans	CHL	54	9	16	25	28	5	2	1	3	2
1981–82	Fredericton Express	AHL	45	18	21	39	68	—	—	—	—	—
CHL totals			131	39	42	81	62	20	10	10	20	4
NHL totals			13	1	1	2	29	—	—	—	—	—
