= Paul Gagné =

Canadian ice hockey player (1962–2025)

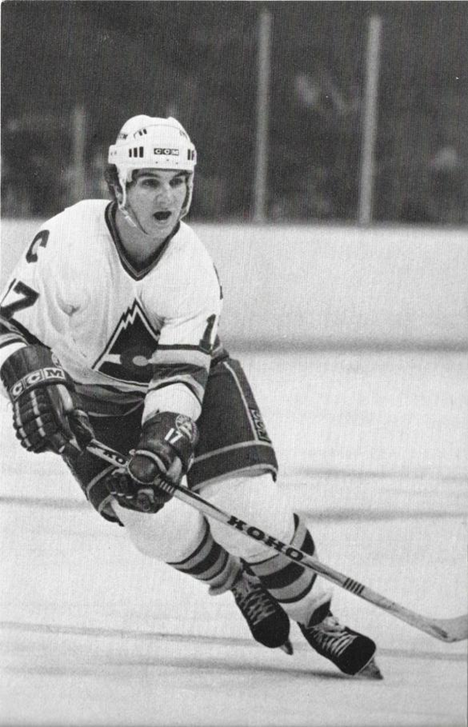
- Gagné in 1981 card for Colorado Rockies
- Born: February 6, 1962 Iroquois Falls, Ontario, Canada
- Died: December 14, 2025 (aged 63)
- Height: 5 ft 10 in (178 cm)
- Weight: 180 lb (82 kg; 12 st 12 lb)
- Position: Left wing
- Shot: Left
- Played for: Colorado Rockies; New Jersey Devils; Toronto Maple Leafs; New York Islanders
- NHL draft: 19th overall, 1980; Colorado Rockies
- Playing career: 1980–1999

Paul L. Gagné (February 6, 1962 – December 14, 2025) was a Canadian professional ice hockey player who played 390 games in the National Hockey League. He played for the Colorado Rockies, New Jersey Devils, Toronto Maple Leafs and New York Islanders.

Gagné coached the Timmins Rock, a team in the NOJHL, until his retirement after the 2016–17 season. He ran a hockey development camp every summer in Timmins, Ontario called Gagné Hockey Development.

== Early career ==
Gagne began his career at the age of 15 in the NOJHL for the Iroquois Falls Abitibi Eskimos. The Left Wing player had 45 goals and 85 points in 43 games that year. In the next year he played in the OMJHL with the Windsor Spitfires (24 goals and 42 points in 67 games). It was his 101 points in 1979-1980 that led him to be drafted at the age of 17.

== Pro career ==
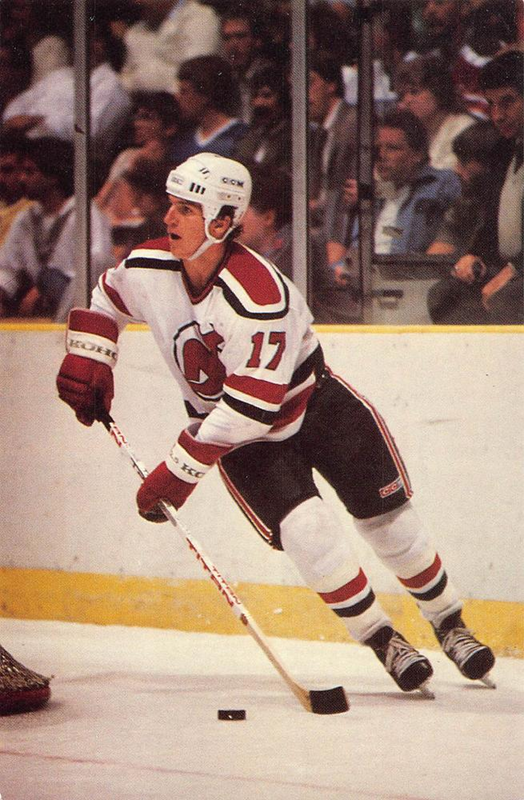
1985 postcard for Gagné for New Jersey Devils

Gagne made it to the NHL with the Rockies in 1980, playing 61 games and recording 41 points. In the following season, the last before the team relocated to New Jersey, he recorded 22 points in 59 games. In the 1982-83 season for the newly relocated New Jersey Devils, he played most of the year with the team while also playing in the CHL; he recorded 29 points in 53 games. He had 30-point seasons in the next three years before suffering a back injury in the latter part of the 1985-86 season. He ultimately didn't play again until the 1988-89 season for the Toronto Maple Leafs, where he had five points in 16 games. He spent the next two seasons with the Newmarket Saints in the AHL before getting nine games with the New York Islanders that ended up being his last games played in the NHL. He spent the entirety of the 1990s playing in Europe for the Eishockey-Bundesliga, National League B, and the National League before retiring in 1999.

== Personal life and death ==
Gagné had two children with his wife Brenda. Gagné died on December 14, 2025, at the age of 63 from cancer.

== Career statistics ==
| | | | Regular season | | | | | Playoffs |
| Season | Team | League | GP | G | A | Pts | PIM | GP | G | A | Pts | PIM |
|---|---|---|---|---|---|---|---|---|---|---|---|---|
| 1977–78 | Iroquois Falls Eskimos | NOJHL | 43 | 45 | 40 | 85 | | — | — | — | — | — |
| 1978–79 | Windsor Spitfires | OMJHL | 67 | 24 | 18 | 42 | 64 | 7 | 1 | 1 | 2 | 2 |
| 1979–80 | Windsor Spitfires | OMJHL | 65 | 48 | 53 | 101 | 87 | 13 | 7 | 8 | 15 | 19 |
| 1980–81 | Colorado Rockies | NHL | 61 | 25 | 16 | 41 | 12 | — | — | — | — | — |
| 1981–82 | Colorado Rockies | NHL | 59 | 10 | 12 | 22 | 17 | — | — | — | — | — |
| 1982–83 | New Jersey Devils | NHL | 53 | 14 | 15 | 29 | 13 | — | — | — | — | — |
| 1982–83 | Wichita Wind | CHL | 16 | 1 | 9 | 10 | 9 | — | — | — | — | — |
| 1983–84 | New Jersey Devils | NHL | 66 | 14 | 18 | 32 | 33 | — | — | — | — | — |
| 1984–85 | New Jersey Devils | NHL | 79 | 24 | 19 | 43 | 28 | — | — | — | — | — |
| 1985–86 | New Jersey Devils | NHL | 47 | 19 | 19 | 38 | 14 | — | — | — | — | — |
| 1988–89 | Toronto Maple Leafs | NHL | 16 | 3 | 2 | 5 | 6 | — | — | — | — | — |
| 1988–89 | Newmarket Saints | AHL | 56 | 33 | 41 | 74 | 29 | 5 | 4 | 4 | 8 | 5 |
| 1989–90 | Newmarket Saints | AHL | 28 | 13 | 14 | 27 | 11 | — | — | — | — | — |
| 1989–90 | New York Islanders | NHL | 9 | 1 | 0 | 1 | 43 | — | — | — | — | — |
| 1989–90 | Springfield Indians | AHL | 36 | 18 | 29 | 47 | 6 | 13 | 10 | 6 | 16 | 2 |
| 1990–91 | EV Landshut | 1.GBun | 49 | 44 | 37 | 81 | 41 | 5 | 7 | 7 | 14 | 7 |
| 1991–92 | EV Landshut | 1.GBun | 44 | 30 | 23 | 53 | 49 | 8 | 6 | 8 | 14 | 18 |
| 1992–93 | EHC Olten | CHE.2 | 36 | 39 | 28 | 67 | 47 | 7 | 7 | 7 | 14 | 18 |
| 1993–94 | EHC Olten | NDA | 30 | 16 | 18 | 34 | 52 | — | — | — | — | — |
| 1994–95 | EHC Olten | CHE.2 | 32 | 37 | 30 | 67 | 98 | 3 | 1 | 1 | 2 | 35 |
| 1995–96 | EHC Olten | CHE.2 | 26 | 22 | 19 | 41 | 62 | — | — | — | — | — |
| 1995–96 | Zürcher SC | NDA | 8 | 5 | 3 | 8 | 6 | 4 | 0 | 1 | 1 | 8 |
| 1996–97 | EHC Biel-Bienne | CHE.2 | 41 | 33 | 33 | 66 | 73 | 4 | 1 | 3 | 4 | 2 |
| 1997–98 | EHC Biel-Bienne | CHE.2 | 37 | 29 | 37 | 66 | 86 | 12 | 6 | 10 | 16 | 2 |
| 1998–99 | EHC Biel-Bienne | CHE.2 | 33 | 29 | 26 | 55 | 34 | 4 | 0 | 3 | 3 | 4 |
| NHL totals | | | 390 | 110 | 101 | 211 | 166 | — | — | — | — | — |
| AHL totals | | | 120 | 64 | 84 | 148 | 46 | 18 | 14 | 10 | 24 | 7 |
| CHE.2 totals | | | 205 | 189 | 173 | 362 | 400 | 30 | 15 | 24 | 39 | 61 |

| Preceded by Rob Ramage | Colorado Rockies first-round draft pick 1980 | Succeeded by Joe Cirella |
