= Colorado Rockies (NHL) =

Former National Hockey League team (1976–1982)

- Founded: 1974
- History: Kansas City Scouts; 1974–1976; Colorado Rockies; 1976–1982; New Jersey Devils; 1982–present
- Home arena: McNichols Sports Arena
- City: Denver, Colorado
- Team colors: Blue, red, gold, white
- Stanley Cups: 0
- Conference championships: 0
- Division championships: 0

The Colorado Rockies were a professional ice hockey team in the National Hockey League (NHL) that played in Denver from 1976 to 1982. They were founded as the Kansas City Scouts, an expansion team that began play in the NHL in the 1974–75 season. The Scouts moved from Kansas City, Missouri, to Denver for the 1976–77 season. After six seasons in Denver, the franchise moved to East Rutherford, New Jersey, for the 1982–83 season and was renamed the New Jersey Devils. Denver went without an NHL team until the Quebec Nordiques moved to become the Colorado Avalanche after the 1994–95 season. The Colorado Rockies, a Major League Baseball (MLB) team also based in Denver that began play in 1993, took its name from the NHL franchise.

== History ==
Ivan Mullenix, owner of the Central Hockey League's Denver Spurs, received a "conditional" NHL franchise for the 1976–77 season. With McNichols Sports Arena already completed by 1975, he sought to enter the NHL a year early, and the league attempted to broker an arrangement by which he would acquire the struggling California Golden Seals and move them to Denver in lieu of an expansion team. At the same time, another struggling team, the Pittsburgh Penguins, would be sold to a Seattle-based group that had also won a conditional franchise for that city.

The proposed arrangement fell through, and the NHL called off the 1976–77 expansion. The Spurs moved to the World Hockey Association (WHA) for the 1975–76 season, but Denver fans did not consider the WHA a major league and stayed away in droves. By December, rumors that the NHL was preparing to move either the Seals or Kansas City Scouts to Denver led Mullenix to conclude he could not survive in the city. Desperate, he moved the Spurs to Ottawa almost halfway through the season. The renamed Ottawa Civics lasted only two weeks before folding.

Meanwhile, the Scouts were on the verge of collapse despite having entered the NHL only two years earlier. Although they suffered through a 12-win season in 1975–76, they still fared better on the ice over their first two years than their expansion cousins, the Washington Capitals. However, Capitals' owner Abe Pollin was far better financed than the 37-member consortium that owned the Scouts, and had the patience to handle the typical struggles of an expansion team. Additionally, the Scouts were hobbled by an economic downturn in the Midwest. Facing almost $1 million in debt, the Scouts' owners decided to sell the franchise after a season ticket drive sold only 2,000 tickets. A Denver-based group headed by Jack Vickers purchased the Scouts and moved them to Denver, renaming them the Colorado Rockies. The team remained in the Smythe Division of the Campbell Conference and retained the Scouts' colors of blue, red and gold, as they were the same colors used on the Colorado state flag.

=== Continued struggles ===
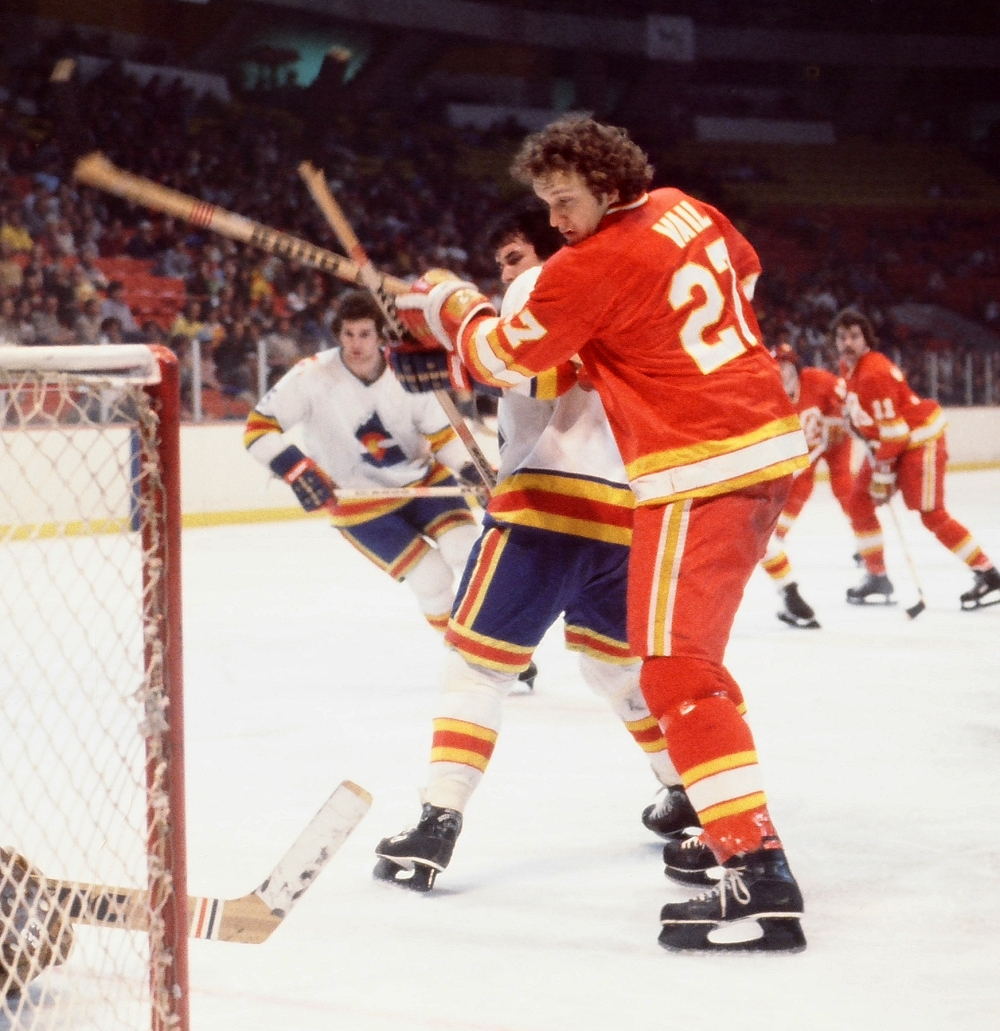
Colorado Rockies against Atlanta Flames in 1978

Despite a new name and a new city, the team's situation did not improve significantly. In their six seasons of existence, the Rockies made the Stanley Cup playoffs only once, in 1977–78. Even then, they finished with the sixth-worst record in the league, 21 games under .500. However, the Smythe Division was so weak that year that the first-place Chicago Black Hawks were the only team in the division with a .500 record. The Rockies edged out the Vancouver Canucks for second place in the division, winning the last playoff spot by only two points (in those days, the division runners-up were guaranteed a playoff spot). The Rockies went down rather meekly in the first round, losing to the Philadelphia Flyers in a two-game sweep. They never came close to the .500 mark during their six years in Denver, never finishing less than 20 games below .500. The 1977–78 season was the only one in which they even came close to a playoff berth, and would be the last time the franchise would do so until 1987-88, its sixth year in New Jersey.

The Rockies did have some star players for a short time. Barry Beck set a record in his rookie year for goals by a rookie defenseman, and Hall of Fame right winger Lanny McDonald was picked up in a trade with Toronto. In addition, they at various times had such players as Chico Resch, Wilf Paiement, Rene Robert, Rob Ramage, and Bobby Schmautz. However, the team suffered a constant lack of overall depth, and trades tended to sacrifice quality for quantity. Plagued by instability, the Rockies had seven coaches in four years, none lasting more than one full season, and ownership changed hands twice in four years. Attendance was fairly respectable, considering that the team was barely competitive on the ice and unstable off it.

=== Under Don Cherry ===
One of the few highlights in the franchise's history came during the 1979–80 season, when the flamboyant Don Cherry, a former Jack Adams Award winner, was named head coach after being fired by the Boston Bruins. Under Cherry, the Rockies adopted the motto "Come to the fights and watch a Rockies game break out!" The phrase was plastered on billboards all over Denver in the 1979–80 season.

As he later admitted, Cherry's outspokenness and feuding with Rockies general manager Ray Miron did not endear him to the front office. While Cherry was adept at motivating the players, goaltending was still the team's weakness, as Miron refused to replace Hardy Astrom, whom Cherry dubbed "The Swedish Sieve". Cherry recalled one game where his players had gotten ten shots on goal without scoring, but Astrom then conceded a goal from the opponent's first shot and so was pulled from net.

The Rockies finished with 51 points, tied for the worst record in the league. Despite this, the team had an average attendance of 9,787, the highest in their six-year history. In their final game, which was held at home, Cherry's team defeated the Penguins 5–0. As it was already known that Cherry would not return the next season, he wore a cowboy hat and cowboy boots for what would be his last NHL game. After the final buzzer sounded, his players formed two lines for him, raising their sticks to form an arch for Cherry to walk under while acknowledging the cheers of the crowd.

== Move to New Jersey ==
The failure of Vickers' petroleum business left him unable to pay the lease at McNichols Arena in 1978. The deal was unfavorable from the beginning, as the Rockies never received any revenue from parking, concessions, or advertising. Vickers sold the Rockies on July 12 of that year to Arthur Imperatore Sr., whose intention was to keep the franchise in Denver temporarily before moving it to the new arena at the Meadowlands Sports Complex in New Jersey which was under construction and expected to be completed by 1980. His imposition of the team's eventual transfer alienated many fans. Before he could complete the move, however, Imperatore sold the Rockies to Buffalo-based cable television magnate Peter Gilbert; the NHL Board of Governors unanimously approved the sale on February 10, 1981. At the time, the NHL seemed to be committed to keeping a team in Denver. Gilbert had promised to not move the team, and league president John Ziegler said that he wanted to make the Rockies a model franchise.

By 1982, the team continued to have financial hardships and were up for sale again. This included a failed bid by an Ottawa-based ownership group intent on moving the Rockies to the Canadian capital, and even considering merging the team into the Capitals much like the league did four years before between the Cleveland Barons (the former Golden Seals) and Minnesota North Stars. Ultimately, the franchise was sold in May to New Jersey shipping tycoon John McMullen, who also owned Major League Baseball's Houston Astros. He announced that he had "big plans" for the franchise, but they involved making the long-awaited move to New Jersey. The team was moved for the 1982–83 season and renamed the New Jersey Devils.

== Legacy ==
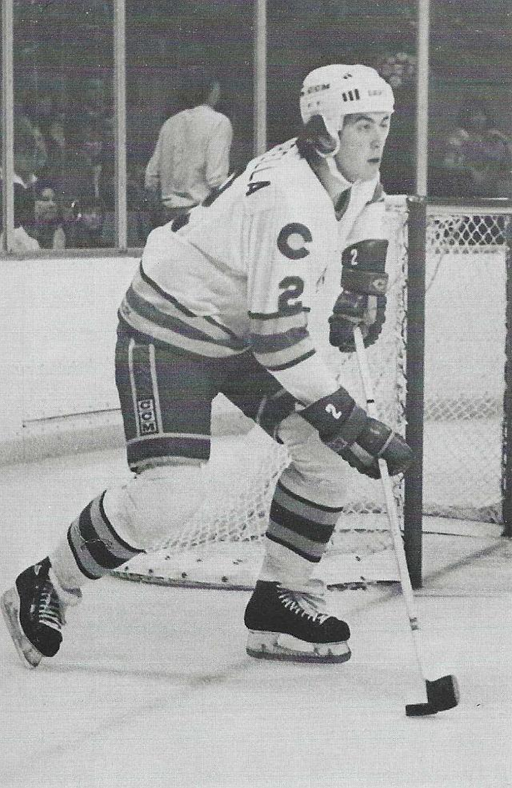
1981 postcard of Joe Cirella, the last former Colorado Rockies player in the NHL

The last Rockies player on the New Jersey Devils' active roster was Aaron Broten, upon his trade to the Minnesota North Stars on January 5, 1990. The last active NHL player who had played for the Rockies was Joe Cirella, who retired from the NHL after the 1995–96 season as a member of the Ottawa Senators. In that season, Colorado saw the NHL return to Denver after 13 years, when the Quebec Nordiques moved to the city and became known as the Colorado Avalanche, though Cirella did not play in either of Ottawa's games against Colorado that season. Additionally, Rockies draft pick Bruce Driver played in the NHL until 1998, but did not join the team until 1983, a year after their move to New Jersey.

Two other former Rockies, Paul Gagne and Rich Chernomaz, played until 1999 in the Swiss and German leagues, respectively.

On January 3, 1996, the Colorado Avalanche hosted the New Jersey Devils in the latter's first visit to Denver since the move. The Devils won the game 1-0, with Steve Thomas scoring the only goal in the game. Later, the 2001 Stanley Cup Final pitted the Avalanche against the former Colorado team, with the Avalanche defeating the Devils in seven games.

The Rockies are credited as being the first team to use the Gary Glitter song "Rock and Roll, Part 2" at a sporting event. The team played it after every goal scored by a Rockies player. Other NHL teams picked up on this practice, as did teams in other leagues. After Glitter's conviction for child sex offenses in 2006, fewer teams used the song.

The Rockies' original logo, a mountain peak with the silhouette of the flag of Colorado, served as inspiration for the Avalanche's secondary logo on their current third jerseys, which were first unveiled in the 2015–16 season. The "C" on the aforementioned logo was also emblazoned on the primary jersey's shoulders as well. The logo was also used on the jersey of the Avalanche for the 2016 Stadium Series.

In the 2022–23 season, both the Colorado Avalanche and the New Jersey Devils wore "Reverse Retro" uniforms featuring the Rockies' red, gold and blue palette.

== Season-by-season record ==
The Rockies had a 113–281–86 regular season record and a 0–2 record in one playoffs appearance.

== Players and personnel ==
=== Hall of Fame members ===
- Lanny McDonald, RW, 1979–1981

=== Team captains ===
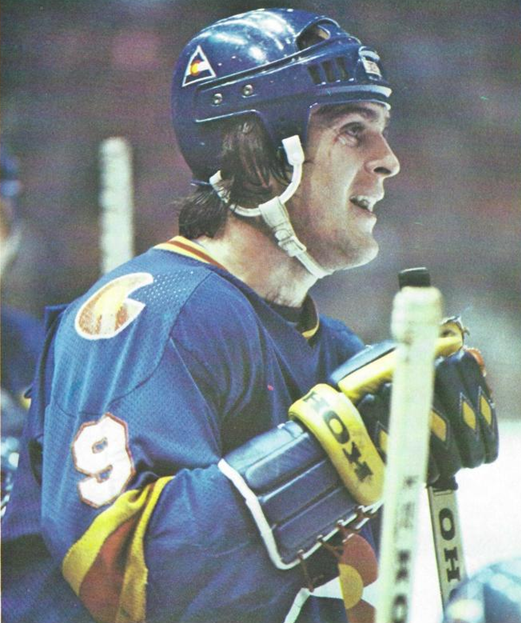
Wilf Paiement, pictured in 1979 for Rockies

This list does not include the captains of the Kansas City Scouts.

- Simon Nolet, 1976–1977
- Wilf Paiement, 1977–1978
- Gary Croteau, 1978–1979
- Mike Christie, Rene Robert and Lanny McDonald, 1979–1980
- Lanny McDonald, 1980–1981
- Lanny McDonald and Rob Ramage, 1981–1982

=== Head coaches ===
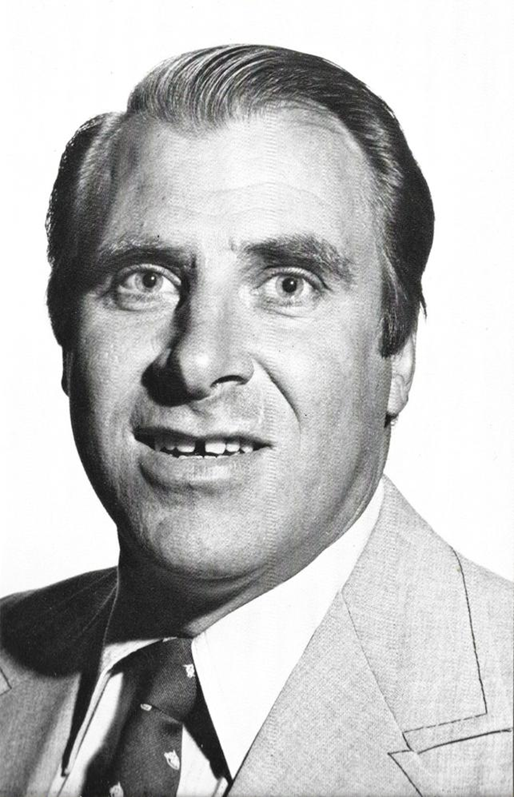
Marshall Johnston, the final head coach of the Colorado Rockies.

This list does not include the coaches of the Kansas City Scouts.

- Johnny Wilson, 1976–1977
- Pat Kelly, 1977–1978
- Aldo Guidolin, 1978–1979
- Don Cherry, 1979–1980
- Billy MacMillan, 1980–1981
- Bert Marshall, 1981
- Marshall Johnston, 1981–1982

=== General managers ===
- Ray Miron, 1976–1981
- Billy MacMillan 1981–1982

=== First-round draft picks ===
Note: This list does not include selections of the Kansas City Scouts.

- 1977: Barry Beck (second overall)
- 1978: Mike Gillis (fifth overall)
- 1979: Rob Ramage (first overall)
- 1980: Paul Gagne (19th overall)
- 1981: Joe Cirella (fifth overall)

== Individual records ==
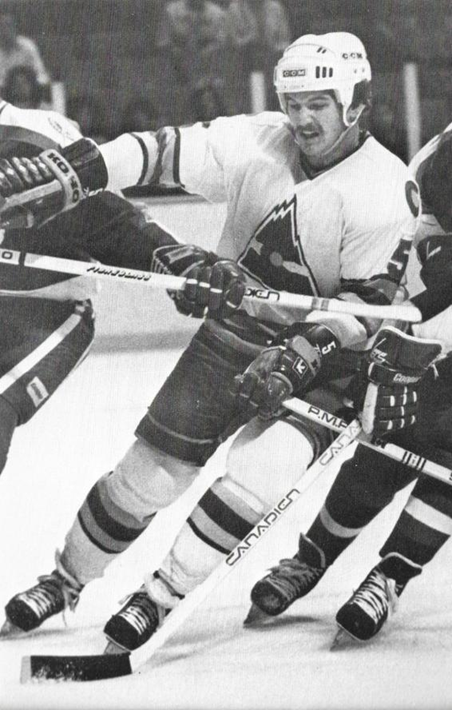
Rob Ramage in 1981 postcard for Colorado Rockies

- Most goals in a season – Wilf Paiement, 41 (1976–77)
- Most assists in a season – Wilf Paiement, 56 (1977–78)
- Most points in a season – Wilf Paiement, 87 (1977–78)
- Most penalty minutes in a season – Rob Ramage, 201 (1981–82)
- Most points in a season, defenceman – Barry Beck, 60 (1977–78)
- Most points in a season, rookie – Barry Beck, 60 (1977–78)
- Most wins in a season – Chico Resch, 16 (1981–82)

== Broadcasters ==
KWGN 2 was the over-the-air television broadcaster throughout the Rockies' existence. From 1976 to 1979, Joe Starkey was the play-by-play announcer for radio and television simulcasts. Don Earle was the secondary play-by-play man in 1977–78. Beginning in 1979–80 and on through the end of their final season in Colorado, Norm Jones was both the radio and television play-by-play man. Ralph Backstrom (1979–80), Jack Jolly (1980–81), and Sandy Clough (1981–82) were the radio color commentators (Clough solely worked home games). From 1979 to 1982, Jim Conrad did color commentary alongside Norm Jones on television.

Preceded by Kansas City Scouts; 1974–1976	Colorado Rockies; 1976–1982	Succeeded by New Jersey Devils; 1982–present
