= 1980–81 Detroit Red Wings season =

National Hockey League team season

1980–81 Detroit Red Wings
- Division: 5th Norris
- Conference: 10th Wales
- 1980–81 record: 19–43–18
- Home record: 16–15–9
- Road record: 3–28–9
- Goals for: 252
- Goals against: 339

Team information
- General manager: Jimmy Skinner
- Coach: Ted Lindsay, Wayne Maxner
- Captain: Errol Thompson and Reed Larson
- Alternate captains: None
- Arena: Joe Louis Arena
- Average attendance: 13,325

Team leaders
- Goals: John Ogrodnick (35)
- Assists: Dale McCourt (56)
- Points: Dale McCourt (86)
- Penalty minutes: Jim Korn (246)
- Wins: Gilles Gilbert (11)
- Goals against average: Gilles Gilbert (4.02)

The 1980–81 Detroit Red Wings season was the Red Wings' 49th season, the first full season at Joe Louis Arena, and 55th overall for the franchise. The team missed the playoffs for the third year in a row since the 1974–75 season and the 1976–77 season it is also the first time since the 1978–79 season that they finished last in the conference.

== Regular season ==
=== Final standings ===
Norris Division
	GP	W	L	T	GF	GA	Pts
**Montreal Canadiens**	80	45	22	13	332	232	103
**Los Angeles Kings**	80	43	24	13	337	290	99
**Pittsburgh Penguins**	80	30	37	13	302	345	73
Hartford Whalers	80	21	41	18	292	372	60
Detroit Red Wings	80	19	43	18	252	339	56

Note: GP = Games played, W = Wins, L = Losses, T = Ties, Pts = Points, GF = Goals for, GA = Goals against
Note: Teams that qualified for the playoffs are highlighted in bold.

League standings
R		Div	GP	W	L	T	GF	GA	Pts
1	**p – New York Islanders**	PTK	80	48	18	14	355	260	110
2	**x – St. Louis Blues**	SMY	80	45	18	17	352	281	107
3	**y – Montreal Canadiens**	NRS	80	45	22	13	332	232	103
4	**Los Angeles Kings**	NRS	80	43	24	13	337	290	99
5	**x – Buffalo Sabres**	ADM	80	39	20	21	327	250	99
6	**Philadelphia Flyers**	PTK	80	41	24	15	313	249	97
7	**Calgary Flames**	PTK	80	39	27	14	329	298	92
8	**Boston Bruins**	ADM	80	37	30	13	316	272	87
9	**Minnesota North Stars**	ADM	80	35	28	17	291	263	87
10	**Chicago Black Hawks**	SMY	80	31	33	16	304	315	78
11	**Quebec Nordiques**	ADM	80	30	32	18	314	318	78
12	**Vancouver Canucks**	SMY	80	28	32	20	289	301	76
13	**New York Rangers**	PTK	80	30	36	14	312	317	74
14	**Edmonton Oilers**	SMY	80	29	35	16	328	327	74
15	**Pittsburgh Penguins**	NRS	80	30	37	13	302	345	73
16	**Toronto Maple Leafs**	ADM	80	28	37	15	322	367	71
17	Washington Capitals	PTK	80	26	36	18	286	317	70
18	Hartford Whalers	NRS	80	21	41	18	292	372	60
19	Colorado Rockies	SMY	80	22	45	13	258	344	57
20	Detroit Red Wings	NRS	80	19	43	18	252	339	56
21	Winnipeg Jets	SMY	80	9	57	14	246	400	32

Divisions: ADM – Adams, NRS – Norris, PTK – Patrick, SMY – Smythe

bold – The top 16 teams in the league qualified for the playoffs, regardless of division or conference.
x – Won division; y – Won Conference (and division); p – Won Presidents' Trophy (and conference and division)

=== Record vs. opponents ===
Norris Division record vs. opponents

==== Vs. Wales Conference ====
**Vs. Norris Division**

1980–81 NHL records
Team	**DET**	**HFD**	**LAK**	**MTL**	**PIT**	**Total**
Detroit	—	0−2−2	1−3	1−3	1−2−1	**3−10−3**
Hartford	2−0−2	—	0−3−1	1−3	2−2	**5−8−3**
Los Angeles	3−1	3−0−1	—	1−3	0−2−2	**7−6−3**
Montreal	3−1	3−1	3−1	—	2−2	**11−5−0**
Pittsburgh	2−1−1	2−2	2−0−2	2−2	—	**8−5−3**

**Vs. Adams Division**

1980–81 NHL records
Team	**BOS**	**BUF**	**MIN**	**QUE**	**TOR**	**Total**
Detroit	0−2−2	0−3−1	0−2−2	0−3−1	3−1	**3−11−6**
Hartford	1−1−2	1−2−1	1−3	2−2	1−1−2	**6−9−5**
Los Angeles	2−2	1−2−1	4−0	3−1	3−0−1	**13−5−2**
Montreal	3−1	3−1	1−2−1	1−1−2	3−1	**11−6−3**
Pittsburgh	0−3−1	0−3−1	1−3	2−1−1	1−2−1	**4−12−4**

==== Vs. Campbell Conference ====
**Vs. Patrick Division**

1980–81 NHL records
Team	**CGY**	**NYI**	**NYR**	**PHI**	**WSH**	**Total**
Detroit	1−2−1	0−4	2−1−1	1−3	1−2−1	**5−12−3**
Hartford	1−3	0−2−2	1−3	0−3−1	1−3	**3−14−3**
Los Angeles	1−3	2−2	3−1	0−4	2−1−1	**8−11−1**
Montreal	2−1−1	1−2−1	2−1−1	2−1−1	2−0−2	**9−5−6**
Pittsburgh	1−2−1	2−1−1	2−1−1	0−4	2−1−1	**7−9−4**

**Vs. Smythe Division**

1980–81 NHL records
Team	**CHI**	**COL**	**EDM**	**STL**	**VAN**	**WIN**	**Total**
Detroit	1−1−2	2−1−1	1−2−1	0−4	1−2−1	3−0−1	**8−10−6**
Hartford	0−3−1	2−1−1	1−2−1	0−3−1	1−1−2	3−0−1	**7−10−7**
Los Angeles	2−0−2	3−0−1	2−0−2	0−2−2	4−0	4−0	**15−2−7**
Montreal	2−2	4−0	2−2	1−1−2	2−0−2	3−1	**14−6−4**
Pittsburgh	1−3	3−1	1−2−1	2−2	0−3−1	4−0	**11−11−2**

== Schedule and results ==
1980–81 regular season
October

Game	Result	Date	Score	Opponent	Record
1	L	October 10, 1980	3–5	@ Vancouver Canucks (1980–81)	0–1–0
2	L	October 11, 1980	1–8	@ Los Angeles Kings (1980–81)	0–2–0
3	L	October 15, 1980	4–6	@ Toronto Maple Leafs (1980–81)	0–3–0
4	L	October 16, 1980	4–6	New York Islanders (1980–81)	0–4–0
5	L	October 18, 1980	2–4	@ Hartford Whalers (1980–81)	0–5–0
6	W	October 23, 1980	5–1	Colorado Rockies (1980–81)	1–5–0
7	W	October 25, 1980	4–2	New York Rangers (1980–81)	2–5–0
8	L	October 26, 1980	6–7	@ New York Rangers (1980–81)	2–6–0
9	T	October 28, 1980	2–2	Chicago Black Hawks (1980–81)	2–6–1
10	L	October 29, 1980	3–5	@ Hartford Whalers (1980–81)	2–7–1

November

Game	Result	Date	Score	Opponent	Record
11	L	November 1, 1980	2–4	Buffalo Sabres (1980–81)	2–8–1
12	L	November 4, 1980	4–6	@ New York Islanders (1980–81)	2–9–1
13	W	November 6, 1980	3–2	Montreal Canadiens (1980–81)	3–9–1
14	L	November 8, 1980	3–5	@ Pittsburgh Penguins (1980–81)	3–10–1
15	T	November 11, 1980	4–4	Boston Bruins (1980–81)	3–10–2
16	T	November 12, 1980	4–4	@ Buffalo Sabres (1980–81)	3–10–3
17	L	November 15, 1980	2–5	@ Philadelphia Flyers (1980–81)	3–11–3
18	L	November 19, 1980	1–2	@ Quebec Nordiques (1980–81)	3–12–3
19	L	November 20, 1980	3–7	@ Montreal Canadiens (1980–81)	3–13–3
20	L	November 22, 1980	2–6	@ St. Louis Blues (1980–81)	3–14–3
21	T	November 26, 1980	7–7	Washington Capitals (1980–81)	3–14–4
22	L	November 29, 1980	1–5	@ New York Islanders (1980–81)	3–15–4

December

Game	Result	Date	Score	Opponent	Record
23	L	December 2, 1980	3–5	@ Boston Bruins (1980–81)	3–16–4
24	L	December 4, 1980	1–4	Quebec Nordiques (1980–81)	3–17–4
25	W	December 6, 1980	4–2	Philadelphia Flyers (1980–81)	4–17–4
26	T	December 7, 1980	1–1	@ Minnesota North Stars (1980–81)	4–17–5
27	L	December 11, 1980	1–2	Los Angeles Kings (1980–81)	4–18–5
28	W	December 13, 1980	7–3	Chicago Black Hawks (1980–81)	5–18–5
29	W	December 14, 1980	5–4	@ Washington Capitals (1980–81)	6–18–5
30	W	December 16, 1980	4–3	Edmonton Oilers (1980–81)	7–18–5
31	W	December 18, 1980	5–3	Toronto Maple Leafs (1980–81)	8–18–5
32	T	December 20, 1980	3–3	@ Colorado Rockies (1980–81)	8–18–6
33	L	December 23, 1980	2–6	Minnesota North Stars (1980–81)	8–19–6
34	T	December 27, 1980	4–4	@ Edmonton Oilers (1980–81)	8–19–7
35	W	December 28, 1980	4–3	@ Winnipeg Jets (1980–81)	9–19–7
36	W	December 31, 1980	3–1	Pittsburgh Penguins (1980–81)	10–19–7

January

Game	Result	Date	Score	Opponent	Record
37	T	January 2, 1981	2–2	Vancouver Canucks (1980–81)	10–19–8
38	L	January 3, 1981	4–6	@ Pittsburgh Penguins (1980–81)	10–20–8
39	L	January 6, 1981	2–6	Montreal Canadiens (1980–81)	10–21–8
40	L	January 8, 1981	4–7	@ Boston Bruins (1980–81)	10–22–8
41	W	January 10, 1981	4–1	Calgary Flames (1980–81)	11–22–8
42	T	January 13, 1981	3–3	Boston Bruins (1980–81)	11–22–9
43	L	January 15, 1981	0–10	@ Calgary Flames (1980–81)	11–23–9
44	L	January 16, 1981	1–3	@ Vancouver Canucks (1980–81)	11–24–9
45	L	January 20, 1981	4–11	@ Los Angeles Kings (1980–81)	11–25–9
46	L	January 22, 1981	0–3	New York Islanders (1980–81)	11–26–9
47	W	January 24, 1981	6–2	Colorado Rockies (1980–81)	12–26–9
48	W	January 26, 1981	4–2	@ Toronto Maple Leafs (1980–81)	13–26–9
49	T	January 28, 1981	2–2	@ Quebec Nordiques (1980–81)	13–26–10
50	T	January 29, 1981	3–3	Minnesota North Stars (1980–81)	13–26–11

February

Game	Result	Date	Score	Opponent	Record
51	L	February 1, 1981	1–4	St. Louis Blues (1980–81)	13–27–11
52	W	February 3, 1981	5–3	Toronto Maple Leafs (1980–81)	14–27–11
53	W	February 5, 1981	6–4	Los Angeles Kings (1980–81)	15–27–11
54	L	February 6, 1981	3–7	@ Buffalo Sabres (1980–81)	15–28–11
55	W	February 8, 1981	3–2	Vancouver Canucks (1980–81)	16–28–11
56	T	February 12, 1981	2–2	Hartford Whalers (1980–81)	16–28–12
57	L	February 14, 1981	1–3	Philadelphia Flyers (1980–81)	16–29–12
58	W	February 17, 1981	6–4	Winnipeg Jets (1980–81)	17–29–12
59	W	February 19, 1981	7–3	New York Rangers (1980–81)	18–29–12
60	L	February 21, 1981	1–4	@ Montreal Canadiens (1980–81)	18–30–12
61	L	February 25, 1981	2–3	St. Louis Blues (1980–81)	18–31–12
62	L	February 27, 1981	2–5	@ Edmonton Oilers (1980–81)	18–32–12

March

Game	Result	Date	Score	Opponent	Record
63	T	March 1, 1981	4–4	@ Winnipeg Jets (1980–81)	18–32–13
64	T	March 4, 1981	3–3	@ Chicago Black Hawks (1980–81)	18–32–14
65	T	March 8, 1981	4–4	@ New York Rangers (1980–81)	18–32–15
66	T	March 10, 1981	4–4	Hartford Whalers (1980–81)	18–32–16
67	L	March 12, 1981	4–9	@ Philadelphia Flyers (1980–81)	18–33–16
68	L	March 14, 1981	3–5	@ St. Louis Blues (1980–81)	18–34–16
69	L	March 17, 1981	3–4	Quebec Nordiques (1980–81)	18–35–16
70	L	March 19, 1981	3–6	Calgary Flames (1980–81)	18–36–16
71	W	March 21, 1981	5–4	Winnipeg Jets (1980–81)	19–36–16
72	L	March 22, 1981	3–9	@ Minnesota North Stars (1980–81)	19–37–16
73	L	March 24, 1981	4–7	@ Colorado Rockies (1980–81)	19–38–16
74	L	March 26, 1981	0–2	Washington Capitals (1980–81)	19–39–16
75	L	March 28, 1981	2–4	Edmonton Oilers (1980–81)	19–40–16
76	L	March 29, 1981	3–4	@ Chicago Black Hawks (1980–81)	19–41–16
77	T	March 31, 1981	5–5	@ Calgary Flames (1980–81)	19–41–17

April

Game	Result	Date	Score	Opponent	Record
78	T	April 2, 1981	1–1	Pittsburgh Penguins (1980–81)	19–41–18
79	L	April 4, 1981	4–5	Buffalo Sabres (1980–81)	19–42–18
80	L	April 5, 1981	2–7	@ Washington Capitals (1980–81)	19–43–18

Legend: Win (2 points) Loss (0 points) Tie (1 point)

== Player statistics ==
=== Regular season ===
Scoring

Player	Pos	GP	G	A	Pts	PIM	+/-	PPG	SHG	GWG
Dale McCourt	C	80	30	56	86	50	-17	11	2	2
John Ogrodnick	LW	80	35	35	70	14	-17	9	2	2
Mike Foligno	RW	80	28	35	63	210	-13	3	0	5
Reed Larson	D	78	27	31	58	153	-35	8	0	0
Willie Huber	D	80	15	34	49	130	-28	3	0	0
Vaclav Nedomansky	RW	74	12	20	32	30	-35	6	0	0
Mark Kirton	C	50	18	13	31	24	-30	6	1	3
Errol Thompson	LW	39	14	12	26	52	-4	5	0	2
George Lyle	LW	31	10	14	24	28	0	3	0	0
Paul Woods	LW	67	8	16	24	45	-10	1	1	1
Brent Peterson	C	53	6	18	24	24	2	1	0	1
Jim Korn	D/LW	63	5	15	20	246	-5	1	1	1
Gary McAdam	LW	40	5	14	19	27	-14	1	0	0
Glenn Hicks	LW	58	5	10	15	84	0	1	0	0
John Barrett	D	56	3	10	13	60	-21	0	0	1
Jean Hamel	D	68	5	7	12	57	-1	0	0	0
Dan Labraaten	LW	44	3	8	11	12	-19	0	0	0
Rick Vasko	D	20	3	7	10	20	-3	1	0	0
Mike Blaisdell	RW	32	3	6	9	10	-7	0	0	0
Perry Miller	D	64	1	8	9	70	-18	0	0	0
Brad Smith	RW	20	5	2	7	93	-12	0	0	0
Joe Paterson	LW	38	2	5	7	53	4	0	0	0
Pete Mahovlich	C	24	1	4	5	26	-8	0	0	1
Jody Gage	RW	16	2	2	4	22	-10	0	0	0
Dennis Polonich	C/RW	32	2	2	4	77	-14	0	0	0
Earl Ingarfield	C	22	2	1	3	16	2	0	0	0
Mal Davis	LW	5	2	0	2	0	5	0	0	0
Greg Joly	D	17	0	2	2	10	-8	0	0	0
Rick Smith	D	11	0	2	2	6	-5	0	0	0
Gilles Gilbert	G	48	0	1	1	12	0	0	0	0
Larry Lozinski	G	30	0	1	1	0	0	0	0	0
Jim Rutherford	G	10	0	1	1	0	0	0	0	0
Tom Bladon	D	2	0	0	0	2	0	0	0	0
Al Jensen	G	1	0	0	0	0	0	0	0	0
Claude Legris	G	3	0	0	0	0	0	0	0	0

Goaltending

Player	MIN	GP	W	L	T	GA	GAA	SO
Gilles Gilbert	2618	48	11	24	9	175	4.01	0
Larry Lozinski	1459	30	6	11	7	105	4.32	0
Jim Rutherford	600	10	2	6	2	43	4.30	0
Al Jensen	60	1	0	1	0	7	7.00	0
Claude Legris	63	3	0	1	0	4	3.81	0
Team:	4800	80	19	43	18	334	4.17	0

Note: GP = Games played; G = Goals; A = Assists; Pts = Points; +/- = Plus-minus PIM = Penalty minutes; PPG = Power-play goals; SHG = Short-handed goals; GWG = Game-winning goals;
MIN = Minutes played; W = Wins; L = Losses; T = Ties; GA = Goals against; GAA = Goals-against average; SO = Shutouts;

== Transactions ==
The Red Wings were involved in the following transactions during the 1980–81 season.

=== Trades ===
June 6, 1980	To Detroit Red Wings Cash	To Minnesota North Stars Alex Pirus
July 15, 1980	To Detroit Red Wings Gilles Gilbert	To Boston Bruins Rogie Vachon
October 31, 1980	To Detroit Red Wings Cash	To Winnipeg Jets Barry Long
December 4, 1980	To Detroit Red Wings Mark Kirton	To Toronto Maple Leafs Jim Rutherford
January 8, 1981	To Detroit Red Wings Gary McAdam	To Pittsburgh Penguins Errol Thompson
February 3, 1981	To Detroit Red Wings Earl Ingarfield Jr.	To Calgary Flames Dan Labraaten
February 24, 1981	To Detroit Red Wings Brad Smith	To Calgary Flames Future considerations

=== Waivers ===
June 8, 1980	From Minnesota North Stars David Hanson
October 10, 1980	From Boston Bruins Rick Smith
November 7, 1980	To Washington Capitals Rick Smith

=== Free agent signings ===
January 14, 1981	From Pittsburgh Penguins Tom Bladon

== Draft picks ==
Detroit's draft picks at the 1980 NHL entry draft held at the Montreal Forum in Montreal.

Round	#	Player	Nationality	College/Junior/Club team (League)
1	11	Mike Blaisdell	Canada	Regina Pats (WHL)
3	46	Mark Osborne	Canada	Niagara Falls Flyers (OHA)
5	88	Mike Corrigan	Canada	Cornwall Royals (QMJHL)
6	109	Wayne Crawford	Canada	Toronto Marlboros (OMJHL)
7	130	Mike Braun	Canada	Niagara Falls Flyers (OMJHL)
8	151	John Beukeboom	Canada	Peterborough Petes (OMJHL)
9	172	Dave Miles	Canada	Brantford Alexanders (OMJHL)
10	193	Brian Rorabeck	Canada	Niagara Falls Flyers (OMJHL)

== See also ==
- 1980–81 NHL season
