= 1980–81 Boston Bruins season =

NHL team season

1980–81 Boston Bruins
- Division: 2nd Adams
- Conference: 4th Wales
- 1980–81 record: 37–30–13
- Home record: 26–10–4
- Road record: 11–20–9
- Goals for: 316
- Goals against: 272

Team information
- General manager: Harry Sinden
- Coach: Gerry Cheevers
- Captain: Wayne Cashman
- Alternate captains: None
- Arena: Boston Garden

Team leaders
- Goals: Rick Middleton (44)
- Assists: Rick Middleton (59)
- Points: Rick Middleton (103)
- Penalty minutes: Terry O'Reilly (223)
- Wins: Rogie Vachon (25)
- Goals against average: Marco Baron (2.85)

The 1980–81 Boston Bruins season was the Bruins' 57th season.

== Regular season ==
=== Final standings ===
Adams Division
	GP	W	L	T	GF	GA	Pts
**Buffalo Sabres**	80	39	20	21	327	250	99
**Boston Bruins**	80	37	30	13	316	272	87
**Minnesota North Stars**	80	35	28	17	291	263	87
**Quebec Nordiques**	80	30	32	18	314	318	78
**Toronto Maple Leafs**	80	28	37	15	322	367	71

Note: GP = Games played, W = Wins, L = Losses, T = Ties, Pts = Points, GF = Goals for, GA = Goals against
Note: Teams that qualified for the playoffs are highlighted in bold.

League standings
R		Div	GP	W	L	T	GF	GA	Pts
1	**p – New York Islanders**	PTK	80	48	18	14	355	260	110
2	**x – St. Louis Blues**	SMY	80	45	18	17	352	281	107
3	**y – Montreal Canadiens**	NRS	80	45	22	13	332	232	103
4	**Los Angeles Kings**	NRS	80	43	24	13	337	290	99
5	**x – Buffalo Sabres**	ADM	80	39	20	21	327	250	99
6	**Philadelphia Flyers**	PTK	80	41	24	15	313	249	97
7	**Calgary Flames**	PTK	80	39	27	14	329	298	92
8	**Boston Bruins**	ADM	80	37	30	13	316	272	87
9	**Minnesota North Stars**	ADM	80	35	28	17	291	263	87
10	**Chicago Black Hawks**	SMY	80	31	33	16	304	315	78
11	**Quebec Nordiques**	ADM	80	30	32	18	314	318	78
12	**Vancouver Canucks**	SMY	80	28	32	20	289	301	76
13	**New York Rangers**	PTK	80	30	36	14	312	317	74
14	**Edmonton Oilers**	SMY	80	29	35	16	328	327	74
15	**Pittsburgh Penguins**	NRS	80	30	37	13	302	345	73
16	**Toronto Maple Leafs**	ADM	80	28	37	15	322	367	71
17	Washington Capitals	PTK	80	26	36	18	286	317	70
18	Hartford Whalers	NRS	80	21	41	18	292	372	60
19	Colorado Rockies	SMY	80	22	45	13	258	344	57
20	Detroit Red Wings	NRS	80	19	43	18	252	339	56
21	Winnipeg Jets	SMY	80	9	57	14	246	400	32

Divisions: ADM – Adams, NRS – Norris, PTK – Patrick, SMY – Smythe

bold – The top 16 teams in the league qualified for the playoffs, regardless of division or conference.
x – Won division; y – Won Conference (and division); p – Won Presidents' Trophy (and conference and division)

=== Record vs. opponents ===
Adams Division record vs. opponents

==== Vs. Wales Conference ====
**Vs. Adams Division**

1980–81 NHL records
Team	**BOS**	**BUF**	**MIN**	**QUE**	**TOR**	**Total**
Boston	—	2–1–1	2–1–1	1–3	1–1–2	**6–6–4**
Buffalo	1–2–1	—	0–1–3	3–0–1	3–1	**7–4–5**
Minnesota	1–2–1	1–0–3	—	2–2	0–4	**4–8–4**
Quebec	3–1	0–3–1	2–2	—	0–2–2	**5–8–3**
Toronto	1–1–2	1–3	4–0	2–0–2	—	**8–4–4**

**Vs. Norris Division**

1980–81 NHL records
Team	**DET**	**HFD**	**LAK**	**MTL**	**PIT**	**Total**
Boston	2−0−2	1−1−2	2−2	1−3	3−0−1	**9–6–5**
Buffalo	3−0−1	2−1−1	2−1−1	1−3	3−0−1	**11–5–4**
Minnesota	2−0−2	3−1	0−4	2−1−1	3−1	**10–7–3**
Quebec	3−0−1	2−2	1−3	1−1−2	1−2–1	**8–8–4**
Toronto	1−3	1–1−2	0−3−1	1−3	2−1–1	**5–11–4**

==== Vs. Campbell Conference ====
**Vs. Patrick Division**

1980–81 NHL records
Team	**CGY**	**NYI**	**NYR**	**PHI**	**WSH**	**Total**
Boston	1–3	2–2	2–2	2–2	2–1–1	**9–10–1**
Buffalo	2–1–1	2–2	2–1–1	2–0–2	2–0–2	**10–4–6**
Minnesota	2–2	0–2–2	1–1–2	1–2–1	3–0–1	**7–7–6**
Quebec	1–1–2	1–3	1–1–2	2–1–1	4–0	**9–6–5**
Toronto	2–2	1–3	2–2	2–0–2	1–3	**8–10–2**

**Vs. Smythe Division**

1980–81 NHL records
Team	**CHI**	**COL**	**EDM**	**STL**	**VAN**	**WIN**	**Total**
Boston	3−1	2−1−1	3−1	1−3	2−2	2−0−2	**13−8−3**
Buffalo	2−2	3–0−1	1−1−2	0−3−1	1−1−2	4−0	**11−7−6**
Minnesota	2−2	2−1–1	2−1−1	2−1–1	2−1−1	4−0	**14−6−4**
Quebec	0−3−1	2−2	3−1	1−2–1	1–1−2	1–1−2	**8−10−6**
Toronto	2−1–1	1−1−2	1−2−1	1−3	0–3−1	2−2	**7−12−5**

== Schedule and results ==
1980–81 regular season
October

Game	Result	Date	Score	Opponent	Record
1	W	October 9, 1980	7–2	New York Rangers (1980–81)	1–0–0
2	L	October 11, 1980	2–5	@ New York Islanders (1980–81)	1–1–0
3	W	October 12, 1980	3–2	Montreal Canadiens (1980–81)	2–1–0
4	L	October 15, 1980	2–3	@ Minnesota North Stars (1980–81)	2–2–0
5	L	October 16, 1980	1–2	@ Calgary Flames (1980–81)	2–3–0
6	L	October 18, 1980	2–3	@ St. Louis Blues (1980–81)	2–4–0
7	L	October 22, 1980	0–4	@ Los Angeles Kings (1980–81)	2–5–0
8	L	October 24, 1980	2–3	@ Vancouver Canucks (1980–81)	2–6–0
9	T	October 26, 1980	7–7	@ Winnipeg Jets (1980–81)	2–6–1
10	L	October 30, 1980	1–3	Calgary Flames (1980–81)	2–7–1

November

Game	Result	Date	Score	Opponent	Record
11	L	November 2, 1980	2–4	@ Philadelphia Flyers (1980–81)	2–8–1
12	L	November 6, 1980	2–4	New York Islanders (1980–81)	2–9–1
13	W	November 9, 1980	7–4	Pittsburgh Penguins (1980–81)	3–9–1
14	T	November 11, 1980	4–4	@ Detroit Red Wings (1980–81)	3–9–2
15	T	November 13, 1980	5–5	Winnipeg Jets (1980–81)	3–9–3
16	W	November 15, 1980	7–4	@ Pittsburgh Penguins (1980–81)	4–9–3
17	W	November 16, 1980	1–0	Philadelphia Flyers (1980–81)	5–9–3
18	W	November 20, 1980	4–2	Colorado Rockies (1980–81)	6–9–3
19	T	November 22, 1980	2–2	@ Washington Capitals (1980–81)	6–9–4
20	T	November 23, 1980	5–5	Toronto Maple Leafs (1980–81)	6–9–5
21	L	November 26, 1980	4–6	@ New York Rangers (1980–81)	6–10–5
22	T	November 27, 1980	3–3	Pittsburgh Penguins (1980–81)	6–10–6
23	W	November 29, 1980	6–3	Edmonton Oilers (1980–81)	7–10–6

December

Game	Result	Date	Score	Opponent	Record
24	W	December 2, 1980	5–3	Detroit Red Wings (1980–81)	8–10–6
25	L	December 6, 1980	1–4	@ Montreal Canadiens (1980–81)	8–11–6
26	W	December 7, 1980	7–3	Washington Capitals (1980–81)	9–11–6
27	W	December 10, 1980	6–4	@ Quebec Nordiques (1980–81)	10–11–6
28	L	December 11, 1980	3–5	Quebec Nordiques (1980–81)	10–12–6
29	L	December 13, 1980	1–2	Vancouver Canucks (1980–81)	10–13–6
30	W	December 14, 1980	7–1	Los Angeles Kings (1980–81)	11–13–6
31	L	December 17, 1980	4–5	@ Hartford Whalers (1980–81)	11–14–6
32	L	December 18, 1980	3–7	St. Louis Blues (1980–81)	11–15–6
33	T	December 20, 1980	4–4	Hartford Whalers (1980–81)	11–15–7
34	W	December 27, 1980	6–3	@ Toronto Maple Leafs (1980–81)	12–15–7
35	L	December 28, 1980	2–5	@ Buffalo Sabres (1980–81)	12–16–7
36	W	December 31, 1980	4–2	@ Chicago Black Hawks (1980–81)	13–16–7

January

Game	Result	Date	Score	Opponent	Record
37	L	January 2, 1981	5–7	@ Edmonton Oilers (1980–81)	13–17–7
38	L	January 3, 1981	1–4	@ Colorado Rockies (1980–81)	13–18–7
39	W	January 5, 1981	4–1	@ Winnipeg Jets (1980–81)	14–18–7
40	W	January 8, 1981	7–4	Detroit Red Wings (1980–81)	15–18–7
41	W	January 10, 1981	3–2	@ New York Islanders (1980–81)	16–18–7
42	W	January 12, 1981	4–3	Minnesota North Stars (1980–81)	17–18–7
43	T	January 13, 1981	3–3	@ Detroit Red Wings (1980–81)	17–18–8
44	L	January 15, 1981	2–3	@ Chicago Black Hawks (1980–81)	17–19–8
45	W	January 17, 1981	6–4	Philadelphia Flyers (1980–81)	18–19–8
46	W	January 19, 1981	5–1	Buffalo Sabres (1980–81)	19–19–8
47	W	January 22, 1981	7–3	St. Louis Blues (1980–81)	20–19–8
48	L	January 24, 1981	4–6	Los Angeles Kings (1980–81)	20–20–8
49	W	January 26, 1981	5–3	Colorado Rockies (1980–81)	21–20–8
50	W	January 29, 1981	7–6	Winnipeg Jets (1980–81)	22–20–8

February

Game	Result	Date	Score	Opponent	Record
51	W	February 1, 1981	6–3	New York Islanders (1980–81)	23–20–8
52	T	February 4, 1981	3–3	@ Hartford Whalers (1980–81)	23–20–9
53	W	February 5, 1981	6–3	New York Rangers (1980–81)	24–20–9
54	L	February 7, 1981	2–6	@ Montreal Canadiens (1980–81)	24–21–9
55	L	February 8, 1981	3–4	Quebec Nordiques (1980–81)	24–22–9
56	T	February 12, 1981	3–3	@ Colorado Rockies (1980–81)	24–22–10
57	W	February 14, 1981	5–4	@ Los Angeles Kings (1980–81)	25–22–10
58	W	February 18, 1981	7–5	@ Vancouver Canucks (1980–81)	26–22–10
59	W	February 20, 1981	5–1	@ Edmonton Oilers (1980–81)	27–22–10
60	L	February 21, 1981	2–7	@ Calgary Flames (1980–81)	27–23–10
61	L	February 25, 1981	3–5	@ Quebec Nordiques (1980–81)	27–24–10
62	W	February 26, 1981	5–1	Minnesota North Stars (1980–81)	28–24–10

March

Game	Result	Date	Score	Opponent	Record
63	W	March 1, 1981	6–4	Buffalo Sabres (1980–81)	29–24–10
64	L	March 3, 1981	2–4	@ St. Louis Blues (1980–81)	29–25–10
65	T	March 4, 1981	3–3	@ Minnesota North Stars (1980–81)	29–25–11
66	W	March 7, 1981	7–1	Chicago Black Hawks (1980–81)	30–25–11
67	W	March 8, 1981	4–1	Vancouver Canucks (1980–81)	31–25–11
68	T	March 11, 1981	4–4	@ Toronto Maple Leafs (1980–81)	31–25–12
69	W	March 13, 1981	7–1	@ Washington Capitals (1980–81)	32–25–12
70	W	March 15, 1981	4–2	Hartford Whalers (1980–81)	33–25–12
71	L	March 18, 1981	2–3	@ New York Rangers (1980–81)	33–26–12
72	L	March 19, 1981	3–5	@ Philadelphia Flyers (1980–81)	33–27–12
73	W	March 21, 1981	4–3	Calgary Flames (1980–81)	34–27–12
74	W	March 23, 1981	7–2	Edmonton Oilers (1980–81)	35–27–12
75	L	March 26, 1981	2–3	Toronto Maple Leafs (1980–81)	35–28–12
76	W	March 28, 1981	5–2	Chicago Black Hawks (1980–81)	36–28–12
77	T	March 30, 1981	2–2	@ Buffalo Sabres (1980–81)	36–28–13

April

Game	Result	Date	Score	Opponent	Record
78	L	April 2, 1981	2–3	Washington Capitals (1980–81)	36–29–13
79	W	April 4, 1981	5–2	@ Pittsburgh Penguins (1980–81)	37–29–13
80	L	April 5, 1981	2–4	Montreal Canadiens (1980–81)	37–30–13

Legend: Win (2 points) Loss (0 points) Tie (1 point)

== Player statistics ==
=== Regular season ===
Scoring

Player	Pos	GP	G	A	Pts	PIM	+/-	PPG	SHG	GWG
Rick Middleton	RW	80	44	59	103	16	15	16	4	7
Peter McNab	C	80	37	46	83	24	12	16	0	4
Brad Park	D	78	14	52	66	111	21	10	0	2
Wayne Cashman	LW	77	25	35	60	80	17	7	0	2
Raymond Bourque	D	67	27	29	56	96	29	9	1	6
Steve Kasper	C	76	21	35	56	94	9	5	0	1
Dwight Foster	RW	77	24	28	52	62	4	3	3	5
Terry O'Reilly	RW	77	8	35	43	223	2	0	0	0
Stan Jonathan	LW	74	14	24	38	192	5	0	0	2
Jean Ratelle	C	47	11	26	37	16	18	4	0	2
Dick Redmond	D	78	15	20	35	60	4	6	2	0
Don Marcotte	LW	72	20	13	33	32	3	4	1	2
Mike O'Connell	D	48	10	22	32	42	-1	2	1	0
Brad McCrimmon	D	78	11	18	29	148	27	1	0	1
Keith Crowder	RW	47	13	12	25	172	9	1	0	1
Mike Milbury	D	77	0	18	18	222	14	0	0	0
Bobby Lalonde	C	62	4	12	16	31	3	0	1	0
Doug Morrison	RW	18	7	3	10	13	5	2	0	0
Bob Miller	C	30	4	4	8	19	-5	0	1	1
Craig MacTavish	C	24	3	5	8	13	-1	0	0	0
Mike Gillis	LW	17	2	4	6	15	-2	0	0	0
Barry Pederson	C	9	1	4	5	6	-5	1	0	0
Larry Melnyk	D	26	0	4	4	39	-7	0	0	0
Al Secord	LW	18	0	3	3	42	2	0	0	0
Tom Songin	RW	9	1	1	2	6	0	0	0	1
Jim Craig	G	23	0	1	1	11	0	0	0	0
Rogie Vachon	G	53	0	1	1	6	0	0	0	0
Marco Baron	G	10	0	0	0	7	0	0	0	0
Gary Doak	D	11	0	0	0	12	-3	0	0	0

Goaltending

Player	MIN	GP	W	L	T	GA	GAA	SO
Rogie Vachon	3021	53	25	19	6	168	3.34	1
Jim Craig	1272	23	9	7	6	78	3.68	0
Marco Baron	507	10	3	4	1	24	2.84	0
Team:	4800	80	37	30	13	270	3.38	1

=== Playoffs ===
Scoring

Player	Pos	GP	G	A	Pts	PIM	PPG	SHG	GWG
Don Marcotte	LW	3	2	2	4	6	0	0	0
Mike O'Connell	D	3	1	3	4	2	0	1	0
Brad Park	D	3	1	3	4	11	1	0	0
Peter McNab	C	3	3	0	3	0	1	0	0
Bobby Lalonde	C	3	2	1	3	2	0	2	0
Terry O'Reilly	RW	3	1	2	3	12	0	0	0
Keith Crowder	RW	3	2	0	2	9	0	0	0
Dwight Foster	RW	3	1	1	2	0	0	0	0
Raymond Bourque	D	3	0	1	1	2	0	0	0
Wayne Cashman	LW	3	0	1	1	0	0	0	0
Steve Kasper	C	3	0	1	1	0	0	0	0
Brad McCrimmon	D	3	0	1	1	2	0	0	0
Rick Middleton	RW	3	0	1	1	2	0	0	0
Mike Milbury	D	2	0	1	1	10	0	0	0
Dick Redmond	D	3	0	1	1	2	0	0	0
Marco Baron	G	1	0	0	0	0	0	0	0
Mike Gillis	LW	1	0	0	0	0	0	0	0
Stan Jonathan	LW	3	0	0	0	30	0	0	0
Jean Ratelle	C	3	0	0	0	0	0	0	0
Rogie Vachon	G	3	0	0	0	0	0	0	0

Goaltending

Player	MIN	GP	W	L	GA	GAA	SO
Marco Baron	20	1	0	1	3	9.00	0
Rogie Vachon	164	3	0	2	16	5.85	0
Team:	184	3	0	3	19	6.20	0

Note:

Pos = Position;GP = Games played; G = Goals; A = Assists; Pts = Points; PIM = Penalty minutes; +/- = Plus/minus; PPG = Power-play goals; SHG = Short-handed goals; GWG = Game-winning goals
Pos = Position;GP = Games played; Min, TOI = Minutes played; W = Wins; L = Losses; T,T/OT = Ties; OTL = Overtime losses; GA = Goals-against; GAA = Goals-against average; SO = Shutouts; SA = Shots against; SV = Shots saved;SV% = Save percentage;

== Transactions ==
The Bruins were involved in the following transactions during the 1980–81 season.

=== Trades ===
June 2, 1980	To Boston Bruins Jim Craig	To Calgary Flames 2nd round pick in 1980 – Steve Konroyd; 3rd round pick in 1981 – Mike Vernon
July 15, 1980	To Boston Bruins Rogie Vachon	To Detroit Red Wings Gilles Gilbert
December 18, 1980	To Boston Bruins Mike O'Connell	To Chicago Black Hawks Al Secord
February 18, 1981	To Boston Bruins Mike Gillis	To Colorado Rockies Bob Miller

=== Waivers ===
October 10, 1980	To Quebec Nordiques John Wensink
October 10, 1980	To Detroit Red Wings Rick Smith

== Draft picks ==
Boston's draft picks at the 1980 NHL entry draft held at the Montreal Forum in Montreal.

Round	#	Player	Nationality	College/Junior/Club team (League)
1	18	Barry Pederson	Canada	Victoria Cougars (WHL)
3	60	Tom Fergus	Canada	Peterborough Petes (OHA)
4	81	Steve Kasper	Canada	Sorel Eperviers (QMJHL)
5	102	Randy Hillier	Canada	Sudbury Wolves (OMJHL)
6	123	Steve Lyons	United States	Matignon High School (USHS-MA)
7	144	Tom McMurchy	Canada	New Westminster Bruins (WHL)
8	165	Mike Moffat	Canada	Kingston Canadians (OMJHL)
9	186	Michael Thelven	Sweden	Djurgardens IF (Sweden)
10	207	Jens Ohling	Sweden	Djurgardens IF (Sweden)

== See also ==
- 1980–81 NHL season
