= Marco Baron =

Canadian ice hockey player (born 1959)

- Born: April 8, 1959 (age 67) Montreal, Quebec, Canada
- Height: 5 ft 11 in (180 cm)
- Weight: 185 lb (84 kg; 13 st 3 lb)
- Position: Goaltender
- Caught: Left
- Played for: Boston Bruins; Los Angeles Kings; Edmonton Oilers; HC Ambri-Piotta
- NHL draft: 99th overall, 1979; Boston Bruins
- Playing career: 1979–1985

Marco Joseph Baron (born April 8, 1959) is a Canadian former professional ice hockey goaltender. He played in the National Hockey League (NHL) with the Boston Bruins, Los Angeles Kings, and Edmonton Oilers between 1980 and 1985.

As a youth, he played in the 1971 and 1972 Quebec International Pee-Wee Hockey Tournaments with a minor ice hockey team from Ahuntsic.

He left the NHL to play in Switzerland for HC Ambri-Piotta. He relocated to Switzerland after his retirement.

== Career statistics ==
=== Regular season and playoffs ===
			Regular season									Playoffs
Season	Team	League	GP	W	L	T	MIN	GA	SO	GAA	SV%	GP	W	L	MIN	GA	SO	GAA	SV%
1975–76	Montreal Juniors	QMJHL	23	12	9	2	1376	81	2	3.53	.886	—	—	—	—	—	—	—	—
1976–77	Montreal Juniors	QMJHL	41	10	16	5	2006	182	1	5.44	.843	—	—	—	—	—	—	—	—
1977–78	Montreal Juniors	QMJHL	61	33	20	6	3395	251	0	4.44	.868	13	8	5	780	51	0	3.92	.879
1978–79	Montreal Juniors	QMJHL	67	37	17	8	3630	230	4	3.80	.877	11	5	5	610	46	0	4.52	.861
1979–80	Boston Bruins	NHL	1	0	0	0	40	2	0	3.00	.846	—	—	—	—	—	—	—	—
1979–80	Binghamton Dusters	AHL	6	0	5	0	265	26	0	5.89	.841	—	—	—	—	—	—	—	—
1979–80	Grand Rapids Owls	IHL	35	—	—	—	1995	135	0	4.06	—	—	—	—	—	—	—	—	—
1980–81	Boston Bruins	NHL	10	3	4	1	505	24	0	2.85	.883	1	0	1	20	3	0	9.00	.750
1980–81	Springfield Indians	AHL	23	12	11	0	1300	79	1	3.65	.878	—	—	—	—	—	—	—	—
1981–82	Boston Bruins	NHL	44	22	16	4	2516	144	1	3.43	.865	—	—	—	—	—	—	—	—
1981–82	Erie Blades	AHL	2	—	—	—	119	8	0	4.03	—	—	—	—	—	—	—	—	—
1982–83	Boston Bruins	NHL	9	6	3	0	514	33	0	3.85	.858	—	—	—	—	—	—	—	—
1982–83	Baltimore Skipjacks	AHL	22	8	11	1	1260	97	0	4.62	.867	—	—	—	—	—	—	—	—
1983–84	Los Angeles Kings	NHL	21	3	14	4	1206	87	0	4.33	.861	—	—	—	—	—	—	—	—
1983–84	Moncton Alpines	AHL	16	6	7	3	858	45	1	3.15	.891	—	—	—	—	—	—	—	—
1984–85	Edmonton Oilers	NHL	1	0	1	0	32	2	0	3.71	.778	—	—	—	—	—	—	—	—
1984–85	Nova Scotia Oilers	AHL	17	8	7	1	1010	45	0	2.67	.905	6	2	4	406	25	0	3.69	—
1984–85	Sherbrooke Canadiens	AHL	1	—	—	—	32	5	0	9.37	.706	—	—	—	—	—	—	—	—
1985–86	HC Ambri-Piotta	NLA	16	—	—	—	—	—	—	4.63	—	—	—	—	—	—	—	—	—
1993–94	HC Ambri-Piotta	NLA	6	—	—	—	—	—	—	5.61	—	—	—	—	—	—	—	—	—
1994–95	GDT Bellinzona	SWI-3	33	—	—	—	—	—	—	—	—	—	—	—	—	—	—	—	—
NHL totals			86	34	38	9	4814	292	1	3.64	.865	—	—	—	—	—	—	—	—
