= 1980–81 Vancouver Canucks season =

11th season in franchise history

1980–81 Vancouver Canucks
- Division: 3rd Smythe
- Conference: 6th Campbell
- 1980–81 record: 28–32–20
- Home record: 17–12–11
- Road record: 11–20–9
- Goals for: 289
- Goals against: 301

Team information
- General manager: Jake Milford
- Coach: Harry Neale
- Captain: Kevin McCarthy
- Alternate captains: Stan Smyl; Unknown
- Arena: Pacific Coliseum
- Average attendance: 14,534

Team leaders
- Goals: Tiger Williams (35)
- Assists: Thomas Gradin (48)
- Points: Thomas Gradin (69)
- Penalty minutes: Tiger Williams (343)*
- Wins: Richard Brodeur (17)
- Goals against average: Richard Brodeur (3.51)

The 1980–81 Vancouver Canucks season was the team's 11th in the National Hockey League (NHL). They finished 3rd in the Smythe Division, scoring 289 goals and allowing 301.

== Regular season ==
=== Final standings ===
Smythe Division
	GP	W	L	T	GF	GA	Pts
**St. Louis Blues**	80	45	18	17	352	281	107
**Chicago Black Hawks**	80	31	33	16	304	315	78
**Vancouver Canucks**	80	28	32	20	289	301	76
**Edmonton Oilers**	80	29	35	16	328	327	74
Colorado Rockies	80	22	45	13	258	344	57
Winnipeg Jets	80	9	57	14	246	400	32

Note: GP = Games played, W = Wins, L = Losses, T = Ties, Pts = Points, GF = Goals for, GA = Goals against
Note: Teams that qualified for the playoffs are highlighted in bold.

League standings
R		Div	GP	W	L	T	GF	GA	Pts
1	**p – New York Islanders**	PTK	80	48	18	14	355	260	110
2	**x – St. Louis Blues**	SMY	80	45	18	17	352	281	107
3	**y – Montreal Canadiens**	NRS	80	45	22	13	332	232	103
4	**Los Angeles Kings**	NRS	80	43	24	13	337	290	99
5	**x – Buffalo Sabres**	ADM	80	39	20	21	327	250	99
6	**Philadelphia Flyers**	PTK	80	41	24	15	313	249	97
7	**Calgary Flames**	PTK	80	39	27	14	329	298	92
8	**Boston Bruins**	ADM	80	37	30	13	316	272	87
9	**Minnesota North Stars**	ADM	80	35	28	17	291	263	87
10	**Chicago Black Hawks**	SMY	80	31	33	16	304	315	78
11	**Quebec Nordiques**	ADM	80	30	32	18	314	318	78
12	**Vancouver Canucks**	SMY	80	28	32	20	289	301	76
13	**New York Rangers**	PTK	80	30	36	14	312	317	74
14	**Edmonton Oilers**	SMY	80	29	35	16	328	327	74
15	**Pittsburgh Penguins**	NRS	80	30	37	13	302	345	73
16	**Toronto Maple Leafs**	ADM	80	28	37	15	322	367	71
17	Washington Capitals	PTK	80	26	36	18	286	317	70
18	Hartford Whalers	NRS	80	21	41	18	292	372	60
19	Colorado Rockies	SMY	80	22	45	13	258	344	57
20	Detroit Red Wings	NRS	80	19	43	18	252	339	56
21	Winnipeg Jets	SMY	80	9	57	14	246	400	32

Divisions: ADM – Adams, NRS – Norris, PTK – Patrick, SMY – Smythe

bold – The top 16 teams in the league qualified for the playoffs, regardless of division or conference.
x – Won division; y – Won Conference (and division); p – Won Presidents' Trophy (and conference and division)

=== Record vs. opponents ===
Smythe Division record vs. opponents

==== Vs. Campbell Conference ====
**Vs. Smythe Division**

1980–81 NHL records
Team	**CHI**	**COL**	**EDM**	**STL**	**VAN**	**WIN**	**Total**
Chicago	—	2−2	1−3	1−2−1	2−2	3−1	9−10−1
Colorado	2−2	—	3−0−1	1−3	0−2−2	1−2−1	7−9−4
Edmonton	3−1	0−3−1	—	1−2−1	2−2	4−0	10−8−2
St. Louis	2−1−1	3−1	2−1−1	—	4−0	2−0−2	13−3−4
Vancouver	2−2	2−0−2	2−2	0−4	—	2−0−2	8−8−4
Winnipeg	1−3	2−1−1	0−4	0−2−2	0−2−2	—	3−12−5

**Vs. Patrick Division**

1980–81 NHL records
Team	**CGY**	**NYI**	**NYR**	**PHI**	**WSH**	**Total**
Chicago	1−0−3	0−4	1−2−1	1−1−2	1−1−2	4−8−8
Colorado	3−1	1−3	3−1	0−4	0−3−1	7−12−1
Edmonton	1−2−1	0−2−2	1−2−1	2−2	1−2−1	5−10−5
St. Louis	2−2	0−2−2	4−0	0−3−1	2−0−2	8−7−5
Vancouver	1−3	1−3	1−2−1	2−1−1	1−1−2	6−10−4
Winnipeg	0−3−1	0−3−1	1−3	1−3	0−3−1	2−15−3

**Vs. Wales Conference**

**Vs. Adams Division**

1980–81 NHL records
Team	**BOS**	**BUF**	**MIN**	**QUE**	**TOR**	**Total**
Chicago	1−3	2−2	2−2	3−0−1	1−2−1	9−9−2
Colorado	1−2−1	0−3−1	1−2−1	2−2	1−1−2	5−10−5
Edmonton	1−3	1−1−2	1−2−1	1−3	2−1−1	6−10−4
St. Louis	3−1	3−0−1	1−2−1	2−1−1	3−1	12−5−3
Vancouver	2−2	1−1−2	1−2−1	1−1−2	3−0−1	8−6−6
Winnipeg	0−2−2	0−4	0−4	1−1−2	2−2	3−13−4

**Vs. Norris Division**

1980–81 NHL records
Team	**DET**	**HFD**	**LAK**	**MTL**	**PIT**	**Total**
Chicago	1−1−2	3−0−1	0−2−2	2−2	3−1	9−6−5
Colorado	1−2−1	1−2−1	0−3−1	0−4	1−3	3−14−3
Edmonton	2−1−1	2−1−1	0−2−2	2−2	2−1−1	8−7−5
St. Louis	4−0	3−0−1	2−0−2	1−1−2	2−2	12−3−5
Vancouver	2−1−1	1−1−2	0−4	0−2−2	3−0−1	6−8−6
Winnipeg	0−3−1	0−3−1	0−4	1−3	0−4	1−17−2

== Schedule and results ==
1980–81 regular season
October

Game	Result	Date	Score	Opponent	Record
1	W	October 10, 1980	5–3	Detroit Red Wings (1980–81)	1–0–0
2	W	October 12, 1980	8–2	Quebec Nordiques (1980–81)	2–0–0
3	L	October 15, 1980	2–4	@ Chicago Black Hawks (1980–81)	2–1–0
4	W	October 16, 1980	5–2	@ Philadelphia Flyers (1980–81)	3–1–0
5	L	October 18, 1980	1–4	@ Montreal Canadiens (1980–81)	3–2–0
6	W	October 21, 1980	6–3	@ New York Islanders (1980–81)	4–2–0
7	L	October 22, 1980	2–3	@ New York Rangers (1980–81)	4–3–0
8	W	October 24, 1980	3–2	Boston Bruins (1980–81)	5–3–0
9	W	October 26, 1980	8–5	Toronto Maple Leafs (1980–81)	6–3–0
10	T	October 29, 1980	3–3	@ Quebec Nordiques (1980–81)	6–3–1

November

Game	Result	Date	Score	Opponent	Record
11	T	November 1, 1980	4–4	@ Hartford Whalers (1980–81)	6–3–2
12	L	November 2, 1980	3–4	@ Buffalo Sabres (1980–81)	6–4–2
13	W	November 5, 1980	4–3	Edmonton Oilers (1980–81)	7–4–2
14	W	November 7, 1980	3–2	Minnesota North Stars (1980–81)	8–4–2
15	W	November 8, 1980	6–4	New York Rangers (1980–81)	9–4–2
16	L	November 11, 1980	2–8	St. Louis Blues (1980–81)	9–5–2
17	T	November 14, 1980	3–3	Montreal Canadiens (1980–81)	9–5–3
18	L	November 16, 1980	2–3	Los Angeles Kings (1980–81)	9–6–3
19	W	November 18, 1980	6–1	Winnipeg Jets (1980–81)	10–6–3
20	W	November 19, 1980	6–4	@ Edmonton Oilers (1980–81)	11–6–3
21	L	November 22, 1980	3–4	@ Hartford Whalers (1980–81)	11–7–3
22	T	November 23, 1980	2–2	@ New York Rangers (1980–81)	11–7–4
23	W	November 26, 1980	7–4	@ Pittsburgh Penguins (1980–81)	12–7–4
24	W	November 28, 1980	6–4	Chicago Black Hawks (1980–81)	13–7–4
25	T	November 29, 1980	3–3	Philadelphia Flyers (1980–81)	13–7–5

December

Game	Result	Date	Score	Opponent	Record
26	T	December 3, 1980	4–4	Hartford Whalers (1980–81)	13–7–6
27	L	December 4, 1980	1–3	@ Los Angeles Kings (1980–81)	13–8–6
28	L	December 7, 1980	3–5	New York Islanders (1980–81)	13–9–6
29	W	December 9, 1980	4–2	@ Washington Capitals (1980–81)	14–9–6
30	W	December 10, 1980	8–5	@ Toronto Maple Leafs (1980–81)	15–9–6
31	W	December 13, 1980	2–1	@ Boston Bruins (1980–81)	16–9–6
32	T	December 14, 1980	2–2	@ Buffalo Sabres (1980–81)	16–9–7
33	T	December 17, 1980	4–4	Montreal Canadiens (1980–81)	16–9–8
34	W	December 19, 1980	10–4	Pittsburgh Penguins (1980–81)	17–9–8
35	T	December 21, 1980	3–3	Buffalo Sabres (1980–81)	17–9–9
36	L	December 26, 1980	3–6	Los Angeles Kings (1980–81)	17–10–9
37	L	December 28, 1980	2–3	St. Louis Blues (1980–81)	17–11–9
38	T	December 30, 1980	3–3	Washington Capitals (1980–81)	17–11–10

January

Game	Result	Date	Score	Opponent	Record
39	T	January 2, 1981	2–2	@ Detroit Red Wings (1980–81)	17–11–11
40	L	January 3, 1981	3–6	@ St. Louis Blues (1980–81)	17–12–11
41	W	January 6, 1981	7–3	@ Colorado Rockies (1980–81)	18–12–11
42	T	January 7, 1981	1–1	@ Minnesota North Stars (1980–81)	18–12–12
43	T	January 9, 1981	4–4	@ Winnipeg Jets (1980–81)	18–12–13
44	T	January 13, 1981	3–3	Colorado Rockies (1980–81)	18–12–14
45	W	January 16, 1981	3–1	Detroit Red Wings (1980–81)	19–12–14
46	W	January 17, 1981	5–2	@ Colorado Rockies (1980–81)	20–12–14
47	T	January 20, 1981	2–2	Toronto Maple Leafs (1980–81)	20–12–15
48	L	January 21, 1981	1–5	@ Edmonton Oilers (1980–81)	20–13–15
49	L	January 24, 1981	5–7	New York Rangers (1980–81)	20–14–15
50	L	January 28, 1981	3–7	@ Chicago Black Hawks (1980–81)	20–15–15
51	L	January 29, 1981	1–3	@ Washington Capitals (1980–81)	20–16–15

February

Game	Result	Date	Score	Opponent	Record
52	W	February 1, 1981	6–2	Calgary Flames (1980–81)	21–16–15
53	T	February 3, 1981	3–3	Washington Capitals (1980–81)	21–16–16
54	L	February 7, 1981	2–9	@ St. Louis Blues (1980–81)	21–17–16
55	L	February 8, 1981	2–3	@ Detroit Red Wings (1980–81)	21–18–16
56	L	February 12, 1981	3–4	@ Philadelphia Flyers (1980–81)	21–19–16
57	T	February 14, 1981	2–2	@ Pittsburgh Penguins (1980–81)	21–19–17
58	L	February 15, 1981	2–7	@ Minnesota North Stars (1980–81)	21–20–17
59	L	February 18, 1981	5–7	Boston Bruins (1980–81)	21–21–17
60	L	February 20, 1981	3–9	Quebec Nordiques (1980–81)	21–22–17
61	L	February 22, 1981	3–5	Calgary Flames (1980–81)	21–23–17
62	W	February 24, 1981	6–4	Philadelphia Flyers (1980–81)	22–23–17
63	L	February 26, 1981	3–4	@ Los Angeles Kings (1980–81)	22–24–17
64	L	February 27, 1981	1–5	New York Islanders (1980–81)	22–25–17

March

Game	Result	Date	Score	Opponent	Record
65	W	March 1, 1981	3–0	Hartford Whalers (1980–81)	23–25–17
66	W	March 4, 1981	5–2	@ Toronto Maple Leafs (1980–81)	24–25–17
67	L	March 7, 1981	1–3	@ New York Islanders (1980–81)	24–26–17
68	L	March 8, 1981	1–4	@ Boston Bruins (1980–81)	24–27–17
69	L	March 10, 1981	2–11	@ Calgary Flames (1980–81)	24–28–17
70	W	March 13, 1981	5–3	Chicago Black Hawks (1980–81)	25–28–17
71	W	March 14, 1981	2–1	Buffalo Sabres (1980–81)	26–28–17
72	W	March 17, 1981	4–3	Pittsburgh Penguins (1980–81)	27–28–17
73	L	March 21, 1981	3–5	@ Montreal Canadiens (1980–81)	27–29–17
74	T	March 23, 1981	3–3	@ Quebec Nordiques (1980–81)	27–29–18
75	T	March 25, 1981	4–4	Colorado Rockies (1980–81)	27–29–19
76	W	March 27, 1981	10–2	@ Winnipeg Jets (1980–81)	28–29–19
77	L	March 29, 1981	2–4	Minnesota North Stars (1980–81)	28–30–19

April

Game	Result	Date	Score	Opponent	Record
78	T	April 1, 1981	4–4	Winnipeg Jets (1980–81)	28–30–20
79	L	April 3, 1981	2–7	Edmonton Oilers (1980–81)	28–31–20
80	L	April 4, 1981	5–6	@ Calgary Flames (1980–81)	28–32–20

Legend: Win (2 points) Loss (0 points) Tie (1 point)

== Transactions ==
The Canucks were involved in the following transactions during the 1980–81 season.

=== Trades ===
October 6, 1980	To Vancouver Canucks Richard Brodeur; 5th round pick in 1981 – Moe Lemay	To New York Islanders 5th round pick in 1981 – Jacques Slyvestre
November 11, 1980	To Vancouver Canucks Mario Marois; Jim Mayer	To New York Rangers Jeff Bandura; Jere Gillis
December 8, 1980	To Vancouver Canucks Mike Christie	To Colorado Rockies Jim Mayer; Cash
March 8, 1981	To Vancouver Canucks Doug Halward	To Los Angeles Kings 5th round pick in 1982 – Ulf Isaksson; Future considerations
March 10, 1981	To Vancouver Canucks Garry Lariviere	To Quebec Nordiques Mario Marois
March 10, 1981	To Vancouver Canucks Blair MacDonald; Rights to Lars-Gunnar Pettersson	To Edmonton Oilers Garry Lariviere; Ken Berry

=== Waivers ===
October 10, 1980	From Edmonton Oilers Colin Campbell
December 15, 1980	From Edmonton Oilers John Hughes

=== Free agent signings ===
September 22, 1980	From Kitchener Rangers (OHL) Joe McDonnell
October 1, 1980	From Kingston Canadians (OHL) Neil Belland
October 2, 1980	From Colorado Rockies Bobby Schmautz

== Draft picks ==
Vancouver's draft picks at the 1980 NHL entry draft held at the Montreal Forum in Montreal.

Round	#	Player	Nationality	College/Junior/Club team (League)
1	7	Rick Lanz	Canada	Oshawa Generals (OHA)
3	49	Andy Schliebener	Canada	Peterborough Petes (OHA)
4	70	Marc Crawford	Canada	Cornwall Royals (QMJHL)
5	91	Darrell May	Canada	Portland Winter Hawks (WHL)
6	112	Ken Berry	Canada	Canadian National Development Team
7	133	Doug Lidster	Canada	Colorado College (NCAA)
8	154	John O'Connor	United States	University of Vermont (ECAC)
9	175	Patrik Sundstrom	Sweden	Umeå (Sweden)
10	196	Grant Martin	Canada	Kitchener Rangers (OMJHL)

== See also ==
- 1980–81 NHL season
