= 1980–81 Colorado Rockies season =

NHL hockey team season

1980–81 Colorado Rockies
- Division: 5th Smythe
- Conference: 10th Campbell
- 1980–81 record: 22–45–13
- Home record: 15–16–9
- Road record: 7–29–4
- Goals for: 258
- Goals against: 344

Team information
- General manager: Ray Miron
- Coach: Bill MacMillan
- Captain: Rene Robert (Oct.–Jan.); Lanny McDonald (Jan.–Apr.)
- Alternate captains: None
- Arena: McNichols Sports Arena
- Average attendance: 8,889

Team leaders
- Goals: Lanny McDonald (35)
- Assists: Lanny McDonald (46)
- Points: Lanny McDonald (81)
- Penalty minutes: Rob Ramage (193)
- Wins: Al Smith (9)
- Goals against average: Phil Myre (3.44)

The 1980–81 Colorado Rockies season was the Rockies' fifth season, and seventh season of the franchise. Bill MacMillan was hired to coach the team, replacing Don Cherry. Like five of the previous six seasons, the Rockies did not qualify for the playoffs.

== Regular season ==
=== Final standings ===
Smythe Division
	GP	W	L	T	GF	GA	Pts
**St. Louis Blues**	80	45	18	17	352	281	107
**Chicago Black Hawks**	80	31	33	16	304	315	78
**Vancouver Canucks**	80	28	32	20	289	301	76
**Edmonton Oilers**	80	29	35	16	328	327	74
Colorado Rockies	80	22	45	13	258	344	57
Winnipeg Jets	80	9	57	14	246	400	32

Note: GP = Games played, W = Wins, L = Losses, T = Ties, Pts = Points, GF = Goals for, GA = Goals against
Note: Teams that qualified for the playoffs are highlighted in bold.

League standings
R		Div	GP	W	L	T	GF	GA	Pts
1	**p – New York Islanders**	PTK	80	48	18	14	355	260	110
2	**x – St. Louis Blues**	SMY	80	45	18	17	352	281	107
3	**y – Montreal Canadiens**	NRS	80	45	22	13	332	232	103
4	**Los Angeles Kings**	NRS	80	43	24	13	337	290	99
5	**x – Buffalo Sabres**	ADM	80	39	20	21	327	250	99
6	**Philadelphia Flyers**	PTK	80	41	24	15	313	249	97
7	**Calgary Flames**	PTK	80	39	27	14	329	298	92
8	**Boston Bruins**	ADM	80	37	30	13	316	272	87
9	**Minnesota North Stars**	ADM	80	35	28	17	291	263	87
10	**Chicago Black Hawks**	SMY	80	31	33	16	304	315	78
11	**Quebec Nordiques**	ADM	80	30	32	18	314	318	78
12	**Vancouver Canucks**	SMY	80	28	32	20	289	301	76
13	**New York Rangers**	PTK	80	30	36	14	312	317	74
14	**Edmonton Oilers**	SMY	80	29	35	16	328	327	74
15	**Pittsburgh Penguins**	NRS	80	30	37	13	302	345	73
16	**Toronto Maple Leafs**	ADM	80	28	37	15	322	367	71
17	Washington Capitals	PTK	80	26	36	18	286	317	70
18	Hartford Whalers	NRS	80	21	41	18	292	372	60
19	Colorado Rockies	SMY	80	22	45	13	258	344	57
20	Detroit Red Wings	NRS	80	19	43	18	252	339	56
21	Winnipeg Jets	SMY	80	9	57	14	246	400	32

Divisions: ADM – Adams, NRS – Norris, PTK – Patrick, SMY – Smythe

bold – The top 16 teams in the league qualified for the playoffs, regardless of division or conference.
x – Won division; y – Won Conference (and division); p – Won Presidents' Trophy (and conference and division)

=== Record vs. opponents ===
Smythe Division record vs. opponents

==== Vs. Campbell Conference ====
**Vs. Smythe Division**

1980–81 NHL records
Team	**CHI**	**COL**	**EDM**	**STL**	**VAN**	**WIN**	**Total**
Chicago	—	2−2	1−3	1−2−1	2−2	3−1	9−10−1
Colorado	2−2	—	3−0−1	1−3	0−2−2	1−2−1	7−9−4
Edmonton	3−1	0−3−1	—	1−2−1	2−2	4−0	10−8−2
St. Louis	2−1−1	3−1	2−1−1	—	4−0	2−0−2	13−3−4
Vancouver	2−2	2−0−2	2−2	0−4	—	2−0−2	8−8−4
Winnipeg	1−3	2−1−1	0−4	0−2−2	0−2−2	—	3−12−5

**Vs. Patrick Division**

1980–81 NHL records
Team	**CGY**	**NYI**	**NYR**	**PHI**	**WSH**	**Total**
Chicago	1−0−3	0−4	1−2−1	1−1−2	1−1−2	4−8−8
Colorado	3−1	1−3	3−1	0−4	0−3−1	7−12−1
Edmonton	1−2−1	0−2−2	1−2−1	2−2	1−2−1	5−10−5
St. Louis	2−2	0−2−2	4−0	0−3−1	2−0−2	8−7−5
Vancouver	1−3	1−3	1−2−1	2−1−1	1−1−2	6−10−4
Winnipeg	0−3−1	0−3−1	1−3	1−3	0−3−1	2−15−3

**Vs. Wales Conference**

**Vs. Adams Division**

1980–81 NHL records
Team	**BOS**	**BUF**	**MIN**	**QUE**	**TOR**	**Total**
Chicago	1−3	2−2	2−2	3−0−1	1−2−1	9−9−2
Colorado	1−2−1	0−3−1	1−2−1	2−2	1−1−2	5−10−5
Edmonton	1−3	1−1−2	1−2−1	1−3	2−1−1	6−10−4
St. Louis	3−1	3−0−1	1−2−1	2−1−1	3−1	12−5−3
Vancouver	2−2	1−1−2	1−2−1	1−1−2	3−0−1	8−6−6
Winnipeg	0−2−2	0−4	0−4	1−1−2	2−2	3−13−4

**Vs. Norris Division**

1980–81 NHL records
Team	**DET**	**HFD**	**LAK**	**MTL**	**PIT**	**Total**
Chicago	1−1−2	3−0−1	0−2−2	2−2	3−1	9−6−5
Colorado	1−2−1	1−2−1	0−3−1	0−4	1−3	3−14−3
Edmonton	2−1−1	2−1−1	0−2−2	2−2	2−1−1	8−7−5
St. Louis	4−0	3−0−1	2−0−2	1−1−2	2−2	12−3−5
Vancouver	2−1−1	1−1−2	0−4	0−2−2	3−0−1	6−8−6
Winnipeg	0−3−1	0−3−1	0−4	1−3	0−4	1−17−2

== Schedule and results ==
1980–81 regular season
October: 4–4–2 (home: 3–1–2; road: 1–3–0)

Game	Date	Visitor	Score	Home	Decision	Attendance	Record	Points	Recap
1	October 11	Calgary	2–6	Colorado	Smith	7,564	1–0–0	2	
2	October 12	Colorado	3–2	Edmonton	Smith	17,500	2–0–0	4	
3	October 14	Quebec	1–4	Colorado	Smith	4,627	3–0–0	6	
4	October 17	Minnesota	5–5	Colorado	Smith	10,202	3–0–1	7	
5	October 18	Colorado	3–4	Los Angeles	Smith	8,776	3–1–1	7	
6	October 22	Colorado	0–3	Hartford	Smith	9,595	3–2–1	7	
7	October 23	Colorado	1–5	Detroit	Åström	9,024	3–3–1	7	
8	October 25	Chicago	3–5	Colorado	Smith	11,672	4–3–1	9	
9	October 28	Los Angeles	8–4	Colorado	Smith	6,284	4–4–1	9	
10	October 30	Washington	5–5	Colorado	Åström	5,207	4–4–2	10	

November: 5–6–2 (home: 2–2–2; road: 3–4–0)

Game	Date	Visitor	Score	Home	Decision	Attendance	Record	Points	Recap
11	November 1	Colorado	5–4	Toronto	Smith		5–4–2	12	
12	November 2	Colorado	5–4	Quebec	Smith		6–4–2	14	
13	November 5	Colorado	3–5	Buffalo	Smith		6–5–2	14	
14	November 6	Hartford	3–3	Colorado	Åström		6–5–3	15	
15	November 8	Toronto	3–3	Colorado	Smith		6–5–4	16	
16	November 11	Montreal	8–2	Colorado	Smith		6–6–4	16	
17	November 14	St. Louis	1–5	Colorado	Åström		7–6–4	18	
18	November 16	Colorado	4–3	Calgary	Smith		8–6–4	20	
19	November 20	Colorado	2–4	Boston	Smith		8–7–4	20	
20	November 22	Colorado	2–4	Pittsburgh	Åström		8–8–4	20	
21	November 25	Edmonton	3–4	Colorado	Smith		9–8–4	22	
22	November 28	Philadelphia	7–4	Colorado	Smith		9–9–4	22	
23	November 30	Colorado	1–4	Buffalo	Åström		9–10–4	22	

December: 4–9–2 (home: 2–1–2; road: 2–8–0)

Game	Date	Visitor	Score	Home	Decision	Attendance	Record	Points	Recap
24	December 2	Colorado	1–5	N.Y. Islanders	Smith		9–11–4	22	
25	December 4	N.Y. Islanders	3–4	Colorado	Åström		10–11–4	24	
26	December 6	Colorado	6–8	Washington	Smith		10–12–4	24	
27	December 7	Colorado	2–4	Philadelphia	Åström		10–13–5	25	
28	December 9	Buffalo	4–4	Colorado	Åström		10–13–5	25	
29	December 12	N.Y. Rangers	4–3	Colorado	Åström		10–14–5	25	
30	December 13	Colorado	4–9	St. Louis	Smith		10–15–5	25	
31	December 17	Colorado	6–1	Chicago	Åström		11–15–5	27	
32	December 18	Colorado	0–2	Philadelphia	Åström		11–16–5	27	
33	December 20	Detroit	3–3	Colorado	Åström		11–16–6	28	
34	December 23	Colorado	4–5	Winnipeg	Smith		11–17–6	28	
35	December 26	Calgary	2–5	Colorado	Åström		12–17–6	30	
36	December 27	Colorado	4–6	Minnesota	Smith		12–18–6	30	
37	December 30	Colorado	3–9	N.Y. Islanders	Åström		12–19–6	30	
38	December 31	Colorado	6–4	N.Y. Rangers	Kaarela		13–18–6	32	

January: 3–8–2 (home: 3–4–1; road: 0–4–1)

Game	Date	Visitor	Score	Home	Decision	Attendance	Record	Points	Recap
39	January 3	Boston	1–4	Colorado	Kaarela		14–19–6	34	
40	January 6	Vancouver	7–3	Colorado	Kaarela		14–20–6	34	
41	January 7	Colorado	2–6	Chicago	Åström		14–21–6	34	
42	January 9	Minnesota	2–4	Colorado	Åström		15–21–6	36	
43	January 12	Washington	2–1	Colorado	Åström		15–22–6	36	
44	January 13	Colorado	3–3	Vancouver	Smith		15–22–7	37	
45	January 15	N.Y. Rangers	3–4	Colorado	Åström		16–22–7	39	
46	January 17	Vancouver	5–2	Colorado	Smith		16–23–7	39	
47	January 23	Winnipeg	2–2	Colorado	Åström		16–23–8	40	
48	January 24	Colorado	2–6	Detroit	Smith		16–24–8	40	
49	January 26	Colorado	3–5	Boston	Åström		16–25–8	40	
50	January 28	Colorado	3–6	Hartford	Smith		16–26–8	40	
51	January 30	Philadelphia	7–4	Colorado	Åström		16–27–8	40	

February: 2–8–2 (home: 2–3–2; road: 0–5–0)

Game	Date	Visitor	Score	Home	Decision	Attendance	Record	Points	Recap
52	February 3	Montreal	5–2	Colorado	Åström		16–28–8	40	
53	February 6	Pittsburgh	4–6	Colorado	Smith		17–28–8	42	
54	February 8	Toronto	6–6	Colorado	Åström		17–28–9	43	
33rd All-Star Game in Inglewood, CA
55	February 12	Boston	3–3	Colorado	Smith		17–28–10	44	
56	February 14	Chicago	4–3	Colorado	Smith		17–29–10	44	
57	February 17	Quebec	6–3	Colorado	Smith		17–30–10	44	
58	February 18	Colorado	2–6	Minnesota	Åström		17–31–10	44	
59	February 21	Colorado	1–4	St. Louis	Smith		17–32–10	44	
60	February 22	Colorado	4–9	Pittsburgh	Smith		17–33–10	44	
61	February 25	Colorado	5–9	Toronto	Kaarela		17–34–10	44	
62	February 26	Colorado	0–6	Montreal	Åström		17–35–10	44	
63	February 28	Edmonton	1–3	Colorado	Myre		18–35–10	46	

March: 4–9–1 (home: 3–5–0; road: 1–4–1)

Game	Date	Visitor	Score	Home	Decision	Attendance	Record	Points	Recap
64	March 3	Hartford	4–5	Colorado	Myre		19–35–10	48	
65	March 6	Los Angeles	3–1	Colorado	Myre		19–36–10	48	
66	March 8	St. Louis	7–0	Colorado	Myre		19–37–10	48	
67	March 10	Colorado	3–4	Washington	Myre		19–38–10	48	
68	March 11	Colorado	4–3	N.Y. Rangers	Resch		20–38–10	50	
69	March 14	Colorado	1–2	Montreal	Resch		20–39–10	50	
70	March 15	Colorado	0–3	Quebec	Myre		20–40–10	50	
71	March 18	Colorado	3–4	Winnipeg	Resch		20–41–10	50	
72	March 20	N.Y. Islanders	5–3	Colorado	Resch		20–42–10	50	
73	March 21	Pittsburgh	3–1	Colorado	Myre		20–43–10	50	
74	March 24	Detroit	4–7	Colorado	Resch		21–43–10	52	
75	March 25	Colorado	4–4	Vancouver	Myre		21–43–11	53	
76	March 27	Buffalo	5–3	Colorado	Resch		21–44–11	53	
77	March 29	Winnipeg	1–2	Colorado	Myre		22–44–11	55	

April: 0–1–2 (home: 0–0–0; road: 0–1–2)

Game	Date	Visitor	Score	Home	Decision	Attendance	Record	Points	Recap
78	April 1	Colorado	4–4	Edmonton	Resch		22–44–12	56	
79	April 2	Colorado	5–3	Calgary	Myre		22–45–12	56	
80	April 4	Colorado	5–5	Los Angeles	Resch		22–45–13	57	

Legend: Win (2 points) Loss (0 points) Tie (1 point)

== Player statistics ==
=== Regular season ===
Scoring

Player	Pos	GP	G	A	Pts	PIM	+/-	PPG	SHG	GWG
Lanny McDonald	RW	80	35	46	81	56	-27	11	0	2
Merlin Malinowski	C	69	25	37	62	61	-24	4	0	1
Rob Ramage	D	79	20	42	62	193	-46	12	1	3
Mike McEwen	D	65	11	35	46	84	-33	5	0	1
Lucien DeBlois	C	74	26	16	42	78	-42	9	1	2
Paul Gagne	LW	61	25	16	41	12	-24	9	0	2
Walt McKechnie	C	53	15	23	38	18	-7	2	2	2
Yvon Vautour	RW	74	15	19	34	143	-20	3	0	0
Joel Quenneville	D	71	10	24	34	86	-24	3	0	1
Randy Pierce	RW	55	9	21	30	52	-28	3	0	3
Ron Delorme	C	65	11	16	27	70	-11	3	0	0
Rene Robert	RW	28	8	11	19	30	-13	4	0	0
Mike Gillis	LW	51	11	7	18	54	-21	1	0	2
Steve Tambellini	C	13	6	12	18	2	-1	2	0	1
Ed Cooper	LW	47	7	7	14	46	-6	1	0	2
Craig Norwich	D	11	3	11	14	10	4	1	0	0
Doug Berry	C	46	3	10	13	9	-15	0	1	0
Jack Valiquette	C	25	3	9	12	7	-12	0	0	0
Barry Smith	C	62	4	4	8	4	-2	0	0	0
Mike Kitchen	D	75	1	7	8	100	-38	0	0	0
Jack Hughes	D	38	2	5	7	91	-22	1	0	0
Trevor Johansen	D	35	0	7	7	18	-20	0	0	0
Bob Miller	C	22	5	1	6	15	-19	2	0	0
Bobby Crawford	RW	15	1	3	4	6	4	0	0	0
Bobby Sheehan	C	41	1	3	4	10	-5	0	0	0
Bob Attwell	RW	15	0	4	4	0	1	0	0	0
Les Auge	D	6	0	3	3	4	-3	0	0	0
Bill Baker	D	13	0	3	3	12	0	0	0	0
Gary Dillon	C	13	1	1	2	29	-6	0	0	0
Mario Giallonardo	D	15	0	2	2	4	1	0	0	0
Terry Harper	D	15	0	2	2	8	-3	0	0	0
Al Smith	G	37	0	2	2	51	0	0	0	0
Hardy Astrom	G	30	0	1	1	2	0	0	0	0
Peter Sturgeon	LW	4	0	1	1	2	0	0	0	0
Dave Watson	LW	13	0	1	1	8	-2	0	0	0
Aaron Broten	LW/C	2	0	0	0	0	0	0	0	0
Mike Christie	D	1	0	0	0	0	1	0	0	0
Jari Kaarela	G	5	0	0	0	2	0	0	0	0
Phil Myre	G	10	0	0	0	0	0	0	0	0
Chico Resch	G	8	0	0	0	0	0	0	0	0
Dean Turner	D	4	0	0	0	4	-4	0	0	0
Joe Ward	C	4	0	0	0	2	-2	0	0	0

Goaltending

Player	MIN	GP	W	L	T	GA	GAA	SO
Al Smith	1909	37	9	18	4	151	4.75	0
Hardy Astrom	1642	30	6	15	6	103	3.76	0
Phil Myre	580	10	3	6	1	33	3.41	0
Jari Kaarela	220	5	2	2	0	22	6.00	0
Chico Resch	449	8	2	4	2	28	3.74	0
Team:	4800	80	22	45	13	337	4.21	0

Note: GP = Games played; G = Goals; A = Assists; Pts = Points; +/- = Plus/minus; PIM = Penalty minutes; PPG=Power-play goals; SHG=Short-handed goals; GWG=Game-winning goals
MIN=Minutes played; W = Wins; L = Losses; T = Ties; GA = Goals against; GAA = Goals against average; SO = Shutouts;

== Draft picks ==
Colorado's draft picks at the 1980 NHL entry draft held at the Montreal Forum in Montreal.

Round	#	Player	Nationality	College/Junior/Club team (League)
1	19	Paul Gagne	Canada	Windsor Spitfires (OHA)
2	22	Joe Ward	Canada	Seattle Breakers (WHL)
4	64	Rick LaFerriere	Canada	Peterborough Petes (OMJHL)
5	85	Ed Cooper	Canada	Portland Winter Hawks (WHL)
6	106	Aaron Broten	United States	University of Minnesota (WCHA)
7	127	Dan Fascinato	Canada	Ottawa 67's (OMJHL)
8	148	Andre Hidi	Canada	Peterborough Petes (OMJHL)
9	169	Shawn MacKenzie	Canada	Windsor Spitfires (OMJHL)
10	190	Bob Jansch	Canada	Victoria Cougars (WHL)

== See also ==
- 1980–81 NHL season
