= 1980–81 New York Islanders season =

NHL hockey team season (won Stanley Cup)

1980–81 New York Islanders
- Stanley Cup champions
- Campbell Conference champions
- Patrick Division champions
- Division: 1st Patrick
- Conference: 1st Campbell
- 1980–81 record: 48–18–14
- Home record: 23–6–11
- Road record: 25–12–3
- Goals for: 355
- Goals against: 260

Team information
- General manager: Bill Torrey
- Coach: Al Arbour
- Captain: Denis Potvin
- Alternate captains: None
- Arena: Nassau Coliseum
- Average attendance: 14,122

Team leaders
- Goals: Mike Bossy (68)
- Assists: Bryan Trottier (72)
- Points: Mike Bossy (119)
- Penalty minutes: Garry Howatt (174)
- Wins: Billy Smith (22)
- Goals against average: Chico Resch (3.07)

The 1980–81 New York Islanders season was the ninth season in the franchise's history. It involved winning the Stanley Cup.

== Offseason ==
=== NHL draft ===
New York's draft picks at the 1980 NHL entry draft held at the Montreal Forum in Montreal.

Round	#	Player	Nationality	College/Junior/Club team (League)
1	17	Brent Sutter	Canada	Red Deer Rustlers (AJHL)
2	38	Kelly Hrudey	Canada	Medicine Hat Tigers (WHL)
3	59	Dave Simpson	Canada	London Knights (OHA)
4	68	Monty Trottier	Canada	Billings Bighorns (WHL)
4	80	Greg Gilbert	Canada	Toronto Marlboros (OMJHL)
5	101	Ken Leiter	United States	Michigan State University (WCHA)
6	122	Dan Revell	Canada	Oshawa Generals (OMJHL)
7	143	Mark Hamway	United States	Michigan State University (WCHA)
8	164	Morey Gare	Canada	Penticton Knights (BCJHL)
9	185	Peter Steblyk	Canada	Medicine Hat Tigers (WHL)
10	206	Glenn Johannesen	Canada	Red Deer Rustlers (AJHL)

== Regular season ==
- January 24, 1981 – In a victory over the Quebec Nordiques, Mike Bossy became the second player in NHL history to score 50 goals in 50 games.

=== Season standings ===
Patrick Division
	GP	W	L	T	GF	GA	Pts
**New York Islanders**	80	48	18	14	355	260	110
**Philadelphia Flyers**	80	41	24	15	313	249	97
**Calgary Flames**	80	39	27	14	329	298	92
**New York Rangers**	80	30	36	14	312	317	74
Washington Capitals	80	26	36	18	286	317	70

Note: GP = Games played, W = Wins, L = Losses, T = Ties, Pts = Points, GF = Goals for, GA = Goals against
Note: Teams that qualified for the playoffs are highlighted in bold.

League standings
R		Div	GP	W	L	T	GF	GA	Pts
1	**p – New York Islanders**	PTK	80	48	18	14	355	260	110
2	**x – St. Louis Blues**	SMY	80	45	18	17	352	281	107
3	**y – Montreal Canadiens**	NRS	80	45	22	13	332	232	103
4	**Los Angeles Kings**	NRS	80	43	24	13	337	290	99
5	**x – Buffalo Sabres**	ADM	80	39	20	21	327	250	99
6	**Philadelphia Flyers**	PTK	80	41	24	15	313	249	97
7	**Calgary Flames**	PTK	80	39	27	14	329	298	92
8	**Boston Bruins**	ADM	80	37	30	13	316	272	87
9	**Minnesota North Stars**	ADM	80	35	28	17	291	263	87
10	**Chicago Black Hawks**	SMY	80	31	33	16	304	315	78
11	**Quebec Nordiques**	ADM	80	30	32	18	314	318	78
12	**Vancouver Canucks**	SMY	80	28	32	20	289	301	76
13	**New York Rangers**	PTK	80	30	36	14	312	317	74
14	**Edmonton Oilers**	SMY	80	29	35	16	328	327	74
15	**Pittsburgh Penguins**	NRS	80	30	37	13	302	345	73
16	**Toronto Maple Leafs**	ADM	80	28	37	15	322	367	71
17	Washington Capitals	PTK	80	26	36	18	286	317	70
18	Hartford Whalers	NRS	80	21	41	18	292	372	60
19	Colorado Rockies	SMY	80	22	45	13	258	344	57
20	Detroit Red Wings	NRS	80	19	43	18	252	339	56
21	Winnipeg Jets	SMY	80	9	57	14	246	400	32

Divisions: ADM – Adams, NRS – Norris, PTK – Patrick, SMY – Smythe

bold – The top 16 teams in the league qualified for the playoffs, regardless of division or conference.
x – Won division; y – Won Conference (and division); p – Won Presidents' Trophy (and conference and division)

=== Record vs. opponents ===
Patrick Division record vs. opponents

==== Vs. Campbell Conference ====
**Vs. Patrick Division**

1980–81 NHL records
Team	**CGY**	**NYI**	**NYR**	**PHI**	**WSH**	**Total**
Calgary	—	1−1−2	2−1−1	2−2	3−1	**8−5−3**
N.Y. Islanders	1−1−2	—	2−2	1−2−1	4−0	**8−5−3**
N.Y. Rangers	1−2−1	2−2	—	1−1−2	2−2	**6−7−3**
Philadelphia	2−2	2−1−1	1−1−2	—	2−2	**7−6−3**
Washington	1−3	0−4	2−2	2−2	—	**5−11−0**

**Vs. Smythe Division**

1980–81 NHL records
Team	**CHI**	**COL**	**EDM**	**STL**	**VAN**	**WIN**	**Total**
Calgary	0−1−3	1−3	2−1−1	2−2	3−1	3−0−1	**11−8−5**
N.Y. Islanders	4−0	3−1	2−0−2	2−0−2	3−1	3−0−1	**17−2−5**
N.Y. Rangers	2−1−1	1−3	2−1−1	0−4	2−1−1	3−1	**10−11−3**
Philadelphia	1−1−2	4−0	2−2	3−0−1	1−2−1	3−1	**14−6−4**
Washington	1−1−2	3−0−1	2−1−1	0−2−2	1−1−2	3−0−1	**10−5−9**

**Vs. Wales Conference**

**Vs. Adams Division**

1980–81 NHL records
Team	**BOS**	**BUF**	**MIN**	**QUE**	**TOR**	**Total**
Calgary	3−1	1−2−1	2−2	1−1−2	2−2	**9−8−3**
N.Y. Islanders	2−2	2−2	2−0−2	3−1	3−1	**12−6−2**
N.Y. Rangers	2−2	1−2−1	1−1−2	1−1−2	2−2	**7−8−5**
Philadelphia	2−2	0−2−2	2−1−1	1−2−1	0−2−2	**5−9−6**
Washington	1−2−1	0−2−2	0−3−1	0−4	3−1	**4−12−4**

**Vs. Norris Division**

1980–81 NHL records
Team	**DET**	**HFD**	**LAK**	**MTL**	**PIT**	**Total**
Calgary	2−1−1	3−1	3−1	1−2−1	2−1−1	**11−6−3**
N.Y. Islanders	4−0	2−0−2	2−2	2−1−1	1−2−1	**11−5−4**
N.Y. Rangers	1−2−1	3−1	1−3	1−2−1	1−2−1	**7−10−3**
Philadelphia	3−1	3−0−1	4−0	1−2−1	4−0	**15−3−2**
Washington	2−1−1	3−1	1−2−1	0−2−2	1−2−1	**7−8−5**

== Schedule and results ==
=== Regular season ===
1980–81 regular season
October

Game	Result	Date	Score	Opponent	Record
1	W	October 11, 1980	5–2	Boston Bruins (1980–81)	1–0–0
2	W	October 12, 1980	2–1	@ Washington Capitals (1980–81)	2–0–0
3	T	October 14, 1980	5–5	St. Louis Blues (1980–81)	2–0–1
4	W	October 16, 1980	6–4	@ Detroit Red Wings (1980–81)	3–0–1
5	T	October 18, 1980	5–5	Edmonton Oilers (1980–81)	3–0–2
6	T	October 19, 1980	3–3	@ Hartford Whalers (1980–81)	3–0–3
7	L	October 21, 1980	3–6	Vancouver Canucks (1980–81)	3–1–3
8	L	October 23, 1980	2–4	@ Philadelphia Flyers (1980–81)	3–2–3
9	L	October 25, 1980	1–3	Philadelphia Flyers (1980–81)	3–3–3
10	L	October 26, 1980	2–5	@ Buffalo Sabres (1980–81)	3–4–3
11	W	October 28, 1980	6–4	Montreal Canadiens (1980–81)	4–4–3

November

Game	Result	Date	Score	Opponent	Record
12	L	November 1, 1980	3–7	Los Angeles Kings (1980–81)	4–5–3
13	W	November 4, 1980	6–4	Detroit Red Wings (1980–81)	5–5–3
14	W	November 6, 1980	4–2	@ Boston Bruins (1980–81)	6–5–3
15	W	November 8, 1980	7–3	Chicago Black Hawks (1980–81)	7–5–3
16	T	November 11, 1980	6–6	Minnesota North Stars (1980–81)	7–5–4
17	W	November 12, 1980	4–2	@ Toronto Maple Leafs (1980–81)	8–5–4
18	W	November 15, 1980	4–1	Buffalo Sabres (1980–81)	9–5–4
19	W	November 17, 1980	2–1	@ Minnesota North Stars (1980–81)	10–5–4
20	W	November 18, 1980	7–2	@ St. Louis Blues (1980–81)	11–5–4
21	W	November 20, 1980	5–0	Hartford Whalers (1980–81)	12–5–4
22	W	November 22, 1980	6–4	New York Rangers (1980–81)	13–5–4
23	T	November 25, 1980	4–4	Winnipeg Jets (1980–81)	13–5–5
24	W	November 27, 1980	4–3	@ Montreal Canadiens (1980–81)	14–5–5
25	W	November 29, 1980	5–1	Detroit Red Wings (1980–81)	15–5–5
26	W	November 30, 1980	7–3	@ Quebec Nordiques (1980–81)	16–5–5

December

Game	Result	Date	Score	Opponent	Record
27	W	December 2, 1980	5–1	Colorado Rockies (1980–81)	17–5–5
28	L	December 4, 1980	3–4	@ Colorado Rockies (1980–81)	17–6–5
29	L	December 6, 1980	3–5	@ Los Angeles Kings (1980–81)	17–7–5
30	W	December 7, 1980	5–3	@ Vancouver Canucks (1980–81)	18–7–5
31	W	December 10, 1980	3–2	@ Edmonton Oilers (1980–81)	19–7–5
32	T	December 13, 1980	4–4	@ Calgary Flames (1980–81)	19–7–6
33	W	December 14, 1980	5–4	@ Winnipeg Jets (1980–81)	20–7–6
34	W	December 16, 1980	6–2	Winnipeg Jets (1980–81)	21–7–6
35	W	December 20, 1980	5–2	Quebec Nordiques (1980–81)	22–7–6
36	W	December 21, 1980	9–0	@ Chicago Black Hawks (1980–81)	23–7–6
37	T	December 23, 1980	2–2	Calgary Flames (1980–81)	23–7–7
38	T	December 27, 1980	5–5	@ Hartford Whalers (1980–81)	23–7–8
39	W	December 30, 1980	9–3	Colorado Rockies (1980–81)	24–7–8

January

Game	Result	Date	Score	Opponent	Record
40	L	January 2, 1981	1–3	@ New York Rangers (1980–81)	24–8–8
41	W	January 3, 1981	8–1	Hartford Whalers (1980–81)	25–8–8
42	W	January 6, 1981	6–3	Toronto Maple Leafs (1980–81)	26–8–8
43	L	January 7, 1981	3–7	@ Pittsburgh Penguins (1980–81)	26–9–8
44	L	January 10, 1981	2–3	Boston Bruins (1980–81)	26–10–8
45	W	January 11, 1981	4–2	@ Philadelphia Flyers (1980–81)	27–10–8
46	W	January 13, 1981	6–3	Pittsburgh Penguins (1980–81)	28–10–8
47	W	January 17, 1981	6–4	Washington Capitals (1980–81)	29–10–8
48	W	January 20, 1981	5–0	Calgary Flames (1980–81)	30–10–8
49	W	January 22, 1981	3–0	@ Detroit Red Wings (1980–81)	31–10–8
50	W	January 24, 1981	7–4	Quebec Nordiques (1980–81)	32–10–8
51	L	January 26, 1981	3–5	Buffalo Sabres (1980–81)	32–11–8
52	W	January 28, 1981	6–4	@ Toronto Maple Leafs (1980–81)	33–11–8
53	L	January 31, 1981	1–5	@ Quebec Nordiques (1980–81)	33–12–8

February

Game	Result	Date	Score	Opponent	Record
54	L	February 1, 1981	3–6	@ Boston Bruins (1980–81)	33–13–8
55	W	February 3, 1981	8–1	Los Angeles Kings (1980–81)	34–13–8
56	L	February 4, 1981	3–9	@ New York Rangers (1980–81)	34–14–8
57	T	February 7, 1981	5–5	Minnesota North Stars (1980–81)	34–14–9
58	L	February 12, 1981	3–5	@ Pittsburgh Penguins (1980–81)	34–15–9
59	T	February 14, 1981	1–1	St. Louis Blues (1980–81)	34–15–10
60	L	February 17, 1981	5–8	Toronto Maple Leafs (1980–81)	34–16–10
61	W	February 21, 1981	6–3	Chicago Black Hawks (1980–81)	35–16–10
62	W	February 23, 1981	4–1	@ Minnesota North Stars (1980–81)	36–16–10
63	L	February 25, 1981	4–11	@ Calgary Flames (1980–81)	36–17–10
64	W	February 27, 1981	5–1	@ Vancouver Canucks (1980–81)	37–17–10
65	W	February 28, 1981	2–1	@ Los Angeles Kings (1980–81)	38–17–10

March

Game	Result	Date	Score	Opponent	Record
66	T	March 3, 1981	8–8	Edmonton Oilers (1980–81)	38–17–11
67	W	March 7, 1981	3–1	Vancouver Canucks (1980–81)	39–17–11
68	W	March 11, 1981	6–3	@ Winnipeg Jets (1980–81)	40–17–11
69	W	March 12, 1981	5–0	@ Edmonton Oilers (1980–81)	41–17–11
70	T	March 14, 1981	3–3	Philadelphia Flyers (1980–81)	41–17–12
71	T	March 17, 1981	3–3	Montreal Canadiens (1980–81)	41–17–13
72	W	March 20, 1981	5–3	@ Colorado Rockies (1980–81)	42–17–13
73	W	March 22, 1981	6–2	@ Chicago Black Hawks (1980–81)	43–17–13
74	W	March 24, 1981	5–3	@ St. Louis Blues (1980–81)	44–17–13
75	T	March 28, 1981	4–4	Pittsburgh Penguins (1980–81)	44–17–14
76	W	March 29, 1981	5–4	@ Washington Capitals (1980–81)	45–17–14
77	L	March 31, 1981	1–3	@ Montreal Canadiens (1980–81)	45–18–14

April

Game	Result	Date	Score	Opponent	Record
78	W	April 2, 1981	2–1	New York Rangers (1980–81)	46–18–14
79	W	April 4, 1981	4–1	Washington Capitals (1980–81)	47–18–14
80	W	April 5, 1981	7–3	@ Buffalo Sabres (1980–81)	48–18–14

Legend: Win (2 points) Loss (0 points) Tie (1 point)

== Player statistics ==
Regular season
Scoring

Player	Pos	GP	G	A	Pts	PIM	+/-	PPG	SHG	GWG
Mike Bossy	RW	79	68	51	119	32	37	28	2	10
Bryan Trottier	C	73	31	72	103	74	49	9	2	5
Clark Gillies	LW	80	33	45	78	99	26	9	0	3
Bob Bourne	C	78	35	41	76	62	34	9	7	5
Denis Potvin	D	74	20	56	76	104	38	9	0	4
Anders Kallur	RW	78	36	28	64	32	25	7	6	4
Stefan Persson	D	80	9	52	61	82	24	6	0	2
Butch Goring	C	78	23	37	60	0	4	4	1	1
John Tonelli	LW	70	20	32	52	57	8	2	0	3
Bob Nystrom	RW	79	14	30	44	145	6	3	0	0
Steve Tambellini	C	61	19	17	36	17	-12	2	0	4
Wayne Merrick	C	71	16	15	31	30	12	1	0	2
Garry Howatt	LW	70	4	15	19	174	12	0	0	0
Duane Sutter	RW	23	7	11	18	26	-8	1	0	1
Dave Langevin	D	75	1	16	17	122	40	0	0	0
Ken Morrow	D	80	2	11	13	20	19	0	0	0
Bob Lorimer	D	73	1	12	13	77	45	0	0	0
Gord Lane	D	60	3	9	12	124	-6	0	1	1
Hector Marini	RW	14	4	7	11	39	9	1	0	0
Billy Carroll	C	18	4	4	8	6	3	0	0	1
Jean Potvin	D	18	2	3	5	25	-4	2	0	1
Brent Sutter	C	3	2	2	4	0	2	0	0	1
Lorne Henning	C	9	1	2	3	24	4	0	0	0
Mike McEwen	D	13	0	3	3	10	3	0	0	0
Chico Resch	G	32	0	1	1	0	0	0	0	0
Roland Melanson	G	11	0	0	0	4	0	0	0	0
Billy Smith	G	41	0	0	0	33	0	0	0	0

Goaltending

Player	MIN	GP	W	L	T	GA	GAA	SO
Billy Smith	2363	41	22	10	8	129	3.28	2
Chico Resch	1817	32	18	7	5	93	3.07	3
Roland Melanson	620	11	8	1	1	32	3.10	0
Team:	4800	80	48	18	14	254	3.17	5

Playoffs
Scoring

Player	Pos	GP	G	A	Pts	PIM	PPG	SHG	GWG
Mike Bossy	RW	18	17	18	35	4	9	0	3
Bryan Trottier	C	18	11	18	29	34	4	2	1
Denis Potvin	D	18	8	17	25	16	6	1	2
Butch Goring	C	18	10	10	20	6	4	2	2
Wayne Merrick	C	18	6	12	18	8	0	0	1
Clark Gillies	LW	18	6	9	15	28	3	0	0
Mike McEwen	D	17	6	8	14	6	4	0	0
John Tonelli	LW	16	5	8	13	16	0	0	2
Bob Nystrom	RW	18	6	6	12	20	0	0	1
Billy Carroll	C	18	3	9	12	4	0	1	1
Bob Bourne	C	14	4	6	10	19	1	1	1
Hector Marini	RW	9	3	6	9	14	0	0	0
Anders Kallur	RW	12	4	3	7	10	0	2	0
Ken Morrow	D	18	3	4	7	8	0	0	1
Gord Lane	D	12	1	5	6	32	0	0	0
Bob Lorimer	D	18	1	4	5	27	0	0	0
Stefan Persson	D	7	0	5	5	6	0	0	0
Duane Sutter	RW	12	3	1	4	10	0	0	0
Dave Langevin	D	18	0	3	3	25	0	0	0
Garry Howatt	LW	8	0	2	2	15	0	0	0
Billy Smith	G	17	0	1	1	2	0	0	0
Lorne Henning	C	1	0	0	0	0	0	0	0
Roland Melanson	G	3	0	0	0	0	0	0	0

Goaltending

Player	MIN	GP	W	L	GA	GAA	SO
Billy Smith	994	17	14	3	42	2.54	0
Roland Melanson	92	3	1	0	6	3.91	0
Team:	1086	18	15	3	48	2.65	0

Note: Pos = Position; GP = Games played; G = Goals; A = Assists; Pts = Points; +/- = plus/minus; PIM = Penalty minutes; PPG = Power-play goals; SHG = Short-handed goals; GWG = Game-winning goals
MIN = Minutes played; W = Wins; L = Losses; T = Ties; GA = Goals-against; GAA = Goals-against average; SO = Shutouts;

== Playoffs ==
=== Stanley Cup Finals ===
New York Islanders vs. Minnesota North Stars

Date	Visitors	Score	Home	Score	Notes
May 12	Minnesota	3	New York	6	
May 14	Minnesota	3	New York	6	
May 17	New York	7	Minnesota	5	
May 19	New York	2	Minnesota	4	
May 21	Minnesota	1	New York	5	

== Awards and records ==
- Butch Goring, Conn Smythe Trophy

Preceded by New York Islanders; 1980	New York Islanders; Stanley Cup Champions; 1981	Succeeded by New York Islanders; 1982
