= 1980–81 Washington Capitals season =

NHL hockey team season

1980–81 Washington Capitals
- Division: 5th Patrick
- Conference: 9th Campbell
- 1980–81 record: 26–36–18
- Home record: 16–17–7
- Road record: 10–19–11
- Goals for: 286
- Goals against: 317

Team information
- General manager: Max McNab
- Coach: Gary Green
- Captain: Ryan Walter
- Alternate captains: None
- Arena: Capital Centre

Team leaders
- Goals: Dennis Maruk (50)
- Assists: Dennis Maruk (47)
- Points: Dennis Maruk (97)
- Penalty minutes: Alan Hangsleben (198)
- Plus/minus: Bengt-Ake Gustafsson (+11)
- Wins: Mike Palmateer (18)
- Goals against average: Dave Parro (3.64)

The 1980–81 Washington Capitals season was the Washington Capitals seventh season in the National Hockey League (NHL). The Capitals did not qualify for the playoffs for the seventh straight season for the first time in franchise history.

== Regular season ==
=== Final standings ===
Patrick Division
	GP	W	L	T	GF	GA	Pts
**New York Islanders**	80	48	18	14	355	260	110
**Philadelphia Flyers**	80	41	24	15	313	249	97
**Calgary Flames**	80	39	27	14	329	298	92
**New York Rangers**	80	30	36	14	312	317	74
Washington Capitals	80	26	36	18	286	317	70

Note: GP = Games played, W = Wins, L = Losses, T = Ties, Pts = Points, GF = Goals for, GA = Goals against
Note: Teams that qualified for the playoffs are highlighted in bold.

League standings
R		Div	GP	W	L	T	GF	GA	Pts
1	**p – New York Islanders**	PTK	80	48	18	14	355	260	110
2	**x – St. Louis Blues**	SMY	80	45	18	17	352	281	107
3	**y – Montreal Canadiens**	NRS	80	45	22	13	332	232	103
4	**Los Angeles Kings**	NRS	80	43	24	13	337	290	99
5	**x – Buffalo Sabres**	ADM	80	39	20	21	327	250	99
6	**Philadelphia Flyers**	PTK	80	41	24	15	313	249	97
7	**Calgary Flames**	PTK	80	39	27	14	329	298	92
8	**Boston Bruins**	ADM	80	37	30	13	316	272	87
9	**Minnesota North Stars**	ADM	80	35	28	17	291	263	87
10	**Chicago Black Hawks**	SMY	80	31	33	16	304	315	78
11	**Quebec Nordiques**	ADM	80	30	32	18	314	318	78
12	**Vancouver Canucks**	SMY	80	28	32	20	289	301	76
13	**New York Rangers**	PTK	80	30	36	14	312	317	74
14	**Edmonton Oilers**	SMY	80	29	35	16	328	327	74
15	**Pittsburgh Penguins**	NRS	80	30	37	13	302	345	73
16	**Toronto Maple Leafs**	ADM	80	28	37	15	322	367	71
17	Washington Capitals	PTK	80	26	36	18	286	317	70
18	Hartford Whalers	NRS	80	21	41	18	292	372	60
19	Colorado Rockies	SMY	80	22	45	13	258	344	57
20	Detroit Red Wings	NRS	80	19	43	18	252	339	56
21	Winnipeg Jets	SMY	80	9	57	14	246	400	32

Divisions: ADM – Adams, NRS – Norris, PTK – Patrick, SMY – Smythe

bold – The top 16 teams in the league qualified for the playoffs, regardless of division or conference.
x – Won division; y – Won Conference (and division); p – Won Presidents' Trophy (and conference and division)

=== Record vs. opponents ===
Patrick Division record vs. opponents

==== Vs. Campbell Conference ====
**Vs. Patrick Division**

1980–81 NHL records
Team	**CGY**	**NYI**	**NYR**	**PHI**	**WSH**	**Total**
Calgary	—	1−1−2	2−1−1	2−2	3−1	**8−5−3**
N.Y. Islanders	1−1−2	—	2−2	1−2−1	4−0	**8−5−3**
N.Y. Rangers	1−2−1	2−2	—	1−1−2	2−2	**6−7−3**
Philadelphia	2−2	2−1−1	1−1−2	—	2−2	**7−6−3**
Washington	1−3	0−4	2−2	2−2	—	**5−11−0**

**Vs. Smythe Division**

1980–81 NHL records
Team	**CHI**	**COL**	**EDM**	**STL**	**VAN**	**WIN**	**Total**
Calgary	0−1−3	1−3	2−1−1	2−2	3−1	3−0−1	**11−8−5**
N.Y. Islanders	4−0	3−1	2−0−2	2−0−2	3−1	3−0−1	**17−2−5**
N.Y. Rangers	2−1−1	1−3	2−1−1	0−4	2−1−1	3−1	**10−11−3**
Philadelphia	1−1−2	4−0	2−2	3−0−1	1−2−1	3−1	**14−6−4**
Washington	1−1−2	3−0−1	2−1−1	0−2−2	1−1−2	3−0−1	**10−5−9**

**Vs. Wales Conference**

**Vs. Adams Division**

1980–81 NHL records
Team	**BOS**	**BUF**	**MIN**	**QUE**	**TOR**	**Total**
Calgary	3−1	1−2−1	2−2	1−1−2	2−2	**9−8−3**
N.Y. Islanders	2−2	2−2	2−0−2	3−1	3−1	**12−6−2**
N.Y. Rangers	2−2	1−2−1	1−1−2	1−1−2	2−2	**7−8−5**
Philadelphia	2−2	0−2−2	2−1−1	1−2−1	0−2−2	**5−9−6**
Washington	1−2−1	0−2−2	0−3−1	0−4	3−1	**4−12−4**

**Vs. Norris Division**

1980–81 NHL records
Team	**DET**	**HFD**	**LAK**	**MTL**	**PIT**	**Total**
Calgary	2−1−1	3−1	3−1	1−2−1	2−1−1	**11−6−3**
N.Y. Islanders	4−0	2−0−2	2−2	2−1−1	1−2−1	**11−5−4**
N.Y. Rangers	1−2−1	3−1	1−3	1−2−1	1−2−1	**7−10−3**
Philadelphia	3−1	3−0−1	4−0	1−2−1	4−0	**15−3−2**
Washington	2−1−1	3−1	1−2−1	0−2−2	1−2−1	**7−8−5**

== Schedule and results ==
1980–81 regular season
October

Game	Result	Date	Score	Opponent	Record
1	W	October 10, 1980	4–1	Winnipeg Jets (1980–81)	1–0–0
2	L	October 12, 1980	1–2	New York Islanders (1980–81)	1–1–0
3	T	October 15, 1980	3–3	Montreal Canadiens (1980–81)	1–1–1
4	W	October 18, 1980	8–2	New York Rangers (1980–81)	2–1–1
5	L	October 19, 1980	4–8	@ Chicago Black Hawks (1980–81)	2–2–1
6	W	October 21, 1980	2–0	Chicago Black Hawks (1980–81)	3–2–1
7	L	October 24, 1980	2–3	St. Louis Blues (1980–81)	3–3–1
8	T	October 25, 1980	3–3	@ St. Louis Blues (1980–81)	3–3–2
9	L	October 29, 1980	2–4	@ Los Angeles Kings (1980–81)	3–4–2
10	T	October 30, 1980	5–5	@ Colorado Rockies (1980–81)	3–4–3

November

Game	Result	Date	Score	Opponent	Record
11	T	November 1, 1980	2–2	@ Edmonton Oilers (1980–81)	3–4–4
12	T	November 2, 1980	4–4	@ Winnipeg Jets (1980–81)	3–4–5
13	L	November 5, 1980	3–5	Los Angeles Kings (1980–81)	3–5–5
14	T	November 8, 1980	3–3	Buffalo Sabres (1980–81)	3–5–6
15	T	November 9, 1980	3–3	@ Buffalo Sabres (1980–81)	3–5–7
16	W	November 12, 1980	3–1	@ Pittsburgh Penguins (1980–81)	4–5–7
17	W	November 15, 1980	8–4	@ Hartford Whalers (1980–81)	5–5–7
18	L	November 18, 1980	2–6	@ Quebec Nordiques (1980–81)	5–6–7
19	W	November 20, 1980	4–2	Calgary Flames (1980–81)	6–6–7
20	T	November 22, 1980	2–2	Boston Bruins (1980–81)	6–6–8
21	T	November 26, 1980	7–7	@ Detroit Red Wings (1980–81)	6–6–9
22	W	November 28, 1980	6–2	Toronto Maple Leafs (1980–81)	7–6–9
23	W	November 29, 1980	7–3	@ Toronto Maple Leafs (1980–81)	8–6–9

December

Game	Result	Date	Score	Opponent	Record
24	T	December 3, 1980	3–3	Minnesota North Stars (1980–81)	8–6–10
25	W	December 6, 1980	8–6	Colorado Rockies (1980–81)	9–6–10
26	L	December 7, 1980	3–7	@ Boston Bruins (1980–81)	9–7–10
27	L	December 9, 1980	2–4	Vancouver Canucks (1980–81)	9–8–10
28	L	December 10, 1980	2–6	@ New York Rangers (1980–81)	9–9–10
29	L	December 12, 1980	2–6	Pittsburgh Penguins (1980–81)	9–10–10
30	L	December 14, 1980	4–5	Detroit Red Wings (1980–81)	9–11–10
31	W	December 17, 1980	5–2	Edmonton Oilers (1980–81)	10–11–10
32	L	December 20, 1980	2–5	Philadelphia Flyers (1980–81)	10–12–10
33	W	December 21, 1980	6–0	@ Philadelphia Flyers (1980–81)	11–12–10
34	W	December 26, 1980	7–3	New York Rangers (1980–81)	12–12–10
35	L	December 27, 1980	4–7	@ Montreal Canadiens (1980–81)	12–13–10
36	T	December 30, 1980	3–3	@ Vancouver Canucks (1980–81)	12–13–11
37	W	December 31, 1980	5–3	@ Winnipeg Jets (1980–81)	13–13–11

January

Game	Result	Date	Score	Opponent	Record
38	L	January 3, 1981	0–3	@ Minnesota North Stars (1980–81)	13–14–11
39	L	January 4, 1981	1–8	Philadelphia Flyers (1980–81)	13–15–11
40	L	January 7, 1981	3–6	@ Edmonton Oilers (1980–81)	13–16–11
41	L	January 8, 1981	0–6	@ Calgary Flames (1980–81)	13–17–11
42	L	January 10, 1981	2–3	@ Minnesota North Stars (1980–81)	13–18–11
43	W	January 12, 1981	2–1	@ Colorado Rockies (1980–81)	14–18–11
44	W	January 15, 1981	3–0	Los Angeles Kings (1980–81)	15–18–11
45	L	January 17, 1981	4–6	@ New York Islanders (1980–81)	15–19–11
46	W	January 18, 1981	3–2	Hartford Whalers (1980–81)	16–19–11
47	L	January 21, 1981	1–2	Minnesota North Stars (1980–81)	16–20–11
48	L	January 24, 1981	4–7	Buffalo Sabres (1980–81)	16–21–11
49	W	January 27, 1981	4–3	Winnipeg Jets (1980–81)	17–21–11
50	W	January 29, 1981	3–1	Vancouver Canucks (1980–81)	18–21–11
51	T	January 31, 1981	4–4	@ Pittsburgh Penguins (1980–81)	18–21–12

February

Game	Result	Date	Score	Opponent	Record
52	W	February 1, 1981	7–4	Edmonton Oilers (1980–81)	19–21–12
53	T	February 3, 1981	3–3	@ Vancouver Canucks (1980–81)	19–21–13
54	L	February 5, 1981	2–5	@ Calgary Flames (1980–81)	19–22–13
55	T	February 7, 1981	4–4	@ Los Angeles Kings (1980–81)	19–22–14
56	L	February 12, 1981	3–6	@ Buffalo Sabres (1980–81)	19–23–14
57	L	February 14, 1981	1–6	@ Montreal Canadiens (1980–81)	19–24–14
58	T	February 18, 1981	5–5	Chicago Black Hawks (1980–81)	19–24–15
59	L	February 21, 1981	4–6	@ New York Rangers (1980–81)	19–25–15
60	L	February 22, 1981	7–11	Quebec Nordiques (1980–81)	19–26–15
61	T	February 25, 1981	2–2	@ Chicago Black Hawks (1980–81)	19–26–16
62	L	February 26, 1981	5–7	Pittsburgh Penguins (1980–81)	19–27–16
63	L	February 28, 1981	4–7	@ St. Louis Blues (1980–81)	19–28–16

March

Game	Result	Date	Score	Opponent	Record
64	L	March 3, 1981	3–6	Calgary Flames (1980–81)	19–29–16
65	L	March 4, 1981	4–7	@ Quebec Nordiques (1980–81)	19–30–16
66	W	March 8, 1981	7–3	Toronto Maple Leafs (1980–81)	20–30–16
67	W	March 10, 1981	4–3	Colorado Rockies (1980–81)	21–30–16
68	W	March 11, 1981	5–2	@ Hartford Whalers (1980–81)	22–30–16
69	L	March 13, 1981	1–7	Boston Bruins (1980–81)	22–31–16
70	L	March 14, 1981	3–5	@ Toronto Maple Leafs (1980–81)	22–32–16
71	L	March 18, 1981	4–6	Quebec Nordiques (1980–81)	22–33–16
72	T	March 21, 1981	3–3	St. Louis Blues (1980–81)	22–33–17
73	T	March 22, 1981	2–2	Montreal Canadiens (1980–81)	22–33–18
74	W	March 24, 1981	5–2	@ Philadelphia Flyers (1980–81)	23–33–18
75	W	March 26, 1981	2–0	@ Detroit Red Wings (1980–81)	24–33–18
76	L	March 27, 1981	3–5	Hartford Whalers (1980–81)	24–34–18
77	L	March 29, 1981	4–5	New York Islanders (1980–81)	24–35–18

April

Game	Result	Date	Score	Opponent	Record
78	W	April 2, 1981	3–2	@ Boston Bruins (1980–81)	25–35–18
79	L	April 4, 1981	1–4	@ New York Islanders (1980–81)	25–36–18
80	W	April 5, 1981	7–2	Detroit Red Wings (1980–81)	26–36–18

Legend: Win (2 points) Loss (0 points) Tie (1 point)

== Player statistics ==
=== Regular season ===
Scoring

Player	Pos	GP	G	A	Pts	PIM	+/-	PPG	SHG	GWG
Dennis Maruk	C	80	50	47	97	87	-7	16	2	5
Mike Gartner	RW	80	48	46	94	100	-5	13	0	3
Ryan Walter	C/LW	80	24	44	68	150	-9	4	0	1
Bob Kelly	LW	80	26	36	62	157	-13	8	0	4
Jean Pronovost	RW	80	22	36	58	61	-9	6	1	4
Bengt-Ake Gustafsson	RW	72	21	34	55	26	11	4	2	1
Dennis Ververgaert	RW	79	14	27	41	40	-5	2	0	2
Rick Green	D	65	8	23	31	91	-15	2	0	1
Darren Veitch	D	59	4	21	25	46	-12	1	0	1
Alan Hangsleben	D	76	5	19	24	198	-7	0	0	0
Tim Tookey	C	29	10	13	23	18	-6	6	0	1
Wes Jarvis	C	55	9	14	23	30	-9	0	1	0
Paul Mulvey	LW	55	7	14	21	166	-9	1	0	0
Guy Charron	C	47	5	13	18	2	-4	2	1	0
Glen Currie	C	40	5	13	18	16	-5	2	1	0
Pat Ribble	D	67	3	15	18	103	-13	3	0	1
Rolf Edberg	C	45	8	8	16	6	1	0	0	0
Howard Walker	D	64	2	11	13	100	9	2	0	0
Pierre Bouchard	D	50	3	7	10	28	-18	0	0	0
Rick Smith	D	40	5	4	9	36	7	2	0	2
Mike Palmateer	G	49	0	8	8	17	0	0	0	0
Jim McTaggart	D	52	1	6	7	185	-5	0	0	0
Yvon Labre	D	25	2	4	6	100	-2	0	0	0
Mark Lofthouse	RW/C	3	1	1	2	4	0	0	0	0
Errol Rausse	LW	5	1	1	2	0	1	0	0	0
Archie Henderson	RW	7	1	0	1	28	-1	0	0	0
Greg Theberge	D	1	1	0	1	0	-2	0	0	0
Dwayne Lowdermilk	D	2	0	1	1	2	-1	0	0	0
Dave Parro	G	18	0	1	1	2	0	0	0	0
Rollie Boutin	G	2	0	0	0	0	0	0	0	0
Tony Cassolato	RW	2	0	0	0	0	0	0	0	0
Gary Inness	G	3	0	0	0	0	0	0	0	0
Jay Johnston	D	2	0	0	0	9	0	0	0	0
Paul MacKinnon	D	14	0	0	0	22	5	0	0	0
Torrie Robertson	LW	3	0	0	0	0	-2	0	0	0
Wayne Stephenson	G	20	0	0	0	4	0	0	0	0

Goaltending

Player	MIN	GP	W	L	T	GA	GAA	SO
Mike Palmateer	2679	49	18	19	9	172	3.85	2
Dave Parro	811	18	4	7	2	49	3.63	1
Wayne Stephenson	1010	20	4	7	5	66	3.92	1
Rollie Boutin	120	2	0	2	0	11	5.50	0
Gary Inness	180	3	0	1	2	9	3.00	0
Team:	4800	80	26	36	18	307	3.84	4

Note: GP = Games played; G = Goals; A = Assists; Pts = Points; +/- = Plus/minus; PIM = Penalty minutes; PPG=Power-play goals; SHG=Short-handed goals; GWG=Game-winning goals
MIN=Minutes played; W = Wins; L = Losses; T = Ties; GA = Goals against; GAA = Goals against average; SO = Shutouts;

== Draft picks ==
Washington's draft picks at the 1980 NHL entry draft held at the Montreal Forum in Montreal.

Round	#	Player	Nationality	College/Junior/Club team (League)
1	5	Darren Veitch	Canada	Regina Pats (WHL)
3	47	Dan Miele	Canada	Providence College (NCAA)
3	55	Torrie Robertson	Canada	Victoria Cougars (WHL)
5	89	Timo Blomqvist	Finland	Jokerit (Finland)
6	110	Todd Bidner	Canada	Toronto Marlboros (OMJHL)
7	131	Frank Perkins	United States	Sudbury Wolves (OMJHL)
8	152	Bruce Raboin	Canada	Providence College (ECAC)
9	173	Peter Andersson	Sweden	Luleå (Sweden)
10	194	Tony Camazzola	Canada	Brandon Wheat Kings (WHL)

== See also ==
- 1980–81 NHL season
