= 1980–81 Buffalo Sabres season =

NHL hockey team season

1980–81 Buffalo Sabres
- Adams Division champions
- Division: 1st Adams
- Conference: 2nd Wales
- 1980–81 record: 36–28–16
- Home record: 21–7–12
- Road record: 18–13–9
- Goals for: 327
- Goals against: 250

Team information
- General manager: Scotty Bowman
- Coach: Roger Neilson
- Captain: Danny Gare
- Alternate captains: None
- Arena: Buffalo Memorial Auditorium
- Average attendance: 16,408

Team leaders
- Goals: Danny Gare (46)
- Assists: John Van Boxmeer (51)
- Points: Danny Gare (85)
- Penalty minutes: Larry Playfair (169)
- Wins: Don Edwards (23)
- Goals against average: Don Edward (2.96)

The 1980–81 Buffalo Sabres season was the Sabres' 11th season of operation for the National Hockey League (NHL) franchise that was established on May 22, 1970. The team won their second consecutive Adams Division regular season championship. As of 2023 this is the only time the Buffalo Sabres have won consecutive division titles.

== Regular season ==
=== Final standings ===
Adams Division
	GP	W	L	T	GF	GA	Pts
**Buffalo Sabres**	80	39	20	21	327	250	99
**Boston Bruins**	80	37	30	13	316	272	87
**Minnesota North Stars**	80	35	28	17	291	263	87
**Quebec Nordiques**	80	30	32	18	314	318	78
**Toronto Maple Leafs**	80	28	37	15	322	367	71

Note: GP = Games played, W = Wins, L = Losses, T = Ties, Pts = Points, GF = Goals for, GA = Goals against
Note: Teams that qualified for the playoffs are highlighted in bold.

League standings
R		Div	GP	W	L	T	GF	GA	Pts
1	**p – New York Islanders**	PTK	80	48	18	14	355	260	110
2	**x – St. Louis Blues**	SMY	80	45	18	17	352	281	107
3	**y – Montreal Canadiens**	NRS	80	45	22	13	332	232	103
4	**Los Angeles Kings**	NRS	80	43	24	13	337	290	99
5	**x – Buffalo Sabres**	ADM	80	39	20	21	327	250	99
6	**Philadelphia Flyers**	PTK	80	41	24	15	313	249	97
7	**Calgary Flames**	PTK	80	39	27	14	329	298	92
8	**Boston Bruins**	ADM	80	37	30	13	316	272	87
9	**Minnesota North Stars**	ADM	80	35	28	17	291	263	87
10	**Chicago Black Hawks**	SMY	80	31	33	16	304	315	78
11	**Quebec Nordiques**	ADM	80	30	32	18	314	318	78
12	**Vancouver Canucks**	SMY	80	28	32	20	289	301	76
13	**New York Rangers**	PTK	80	30	36	14	312	317	74
14	**Edmonton Oilers**	SMY	80	29	35	16	328	327	74
15	**Pittsburgh Penguins**	NRS	80	30	37	13	302	345	73
16	**Toronto Maple Leafs**	ADM	80	28	37	15	322	367	71
17	Washington Capitals	PTK	80	26	36	18	286	317	70
18	Hartford Whalers	NRS	80	21	41	18	292	372	60
19	Colorado Rockies	SMY	80	22	45	13	258	344	57
20	Detroit Red Wings	NRS	80	19	43	18	252	339	56
21	Winnipeg Jets	SMY	80	9	57	14	246	400	32

Divisions: ADM – Adams, NRS – Norris, PTK – Patrick, SMY – Smythe

bold – The top 16 teams in the league qualified for the playoffs, regardless of division or conference.
x – Won division; y – Won Conference (and division); p – Won Presidents' Trophy (and conference and division)

=== Record vs. opponents ===
Adams Division record vs. opponents

==== Vs. Wales Conference ====
**Vs. Adams Division**

1980–81 NHL records
Team	**BOS**	**BUF**	**MIN**	**QUE**	**TOR**	**Total**
Boston	—	2–1–1	2–1–1	1–3	1–1–2	**6–6–4**
Buffalo	1–2–1	—	0–1–3	3–0–1	3–1	**7–4–5**
Minnesota	1–2–1	1–0–3	—	2–2	0–4	**4–8–4**
Quebec	3–1	0–3–1	2–2	—	0–2–2	**5–8–3**
Toronto	1–1–2	1–3	4–0	2–0–2	—	**8–4–4**

**Vs. Norris Division**

1980–81 NHL records
Team	**DET**	**HFD**	**LAK**	**MTL**	**PIT**	**Total**
Boston	2−0−2	1−1−2	2−2	1−3	3−0−1	**9–6–5**
Buffalo	3−0−1	2−1−1	2−1−1	1−3	3−0−1	**11–5–4**
Minnesota	2−0−2	3−1	0−4	2−1−1	3−1	**10–7–3**
Quebec	3−0−1	2−2	1−3	1−1−2	1−2–1	**8–8–4**
Toronto	1−3	1–1−2	0−3−1	1−3	2−1–1	**5–11–4**

==== Vs. Campbell Conference ====
**Vs. Patrick Division**

1980–81 NHL records
Team	**CGY**	**NYI**	**NYR**	**PHI**	**WSH**	**Total**
Boston	1–3	2–2	2–2	2–2	2–1–1	**9–10–1**
Buffalo	2–1–1	2–2	2–1–1	2–0–2	2–0–2	**10–4–6**
Minnesota	2–2	0–2–2	1–1–2	1–2–1	3–0–1	**7–7–6**
Quebec	1–1–2	1–3	1–1–2	2–1–1	4–0	**9–6–5**
Toronto	2–2	1–3	2–2	2–0–2	1–3	**8–10–2**

**Vs. Smythe Division**

1980–81 NHL records
Team	**CHI**	**COL**	**EDM**	**STL**	**VAN**	**WIN**	**Total**
Boston	3−1	2−1−1	3−1	1−3	2−2	2−0−2	**13−8−3**
Buffalo	2−2	3–0−1	1−1−2	0−3−1	1−1−2	4−0	**11−7−6**
Minnesota	2−2	2−1–1	2−1−1	2−1–1	2−1−1	4−0	**14−6−4**
Quebec	0−3−1	2−2	3−1	1−2–1	1–1−2	1–1−2	**8−10−6**
Toronto	2−1–1	1−1−2	1−2−1	1−3	0–3−1	2−2	**7−12−5**

== Schedule and results ==
1980–81 regular season
October

Game	Result	Date	Score	Opponent	Record
1	L	October 9, 1980	3–4	@ Chicago Black Hawks (1980–81)	0–1–0
2	T	October 12, 1980	3–3	Hartford Whalers (1980–81)	0–1–1
3	W	October 15, 1980	2–0	Edmonton Oilers (1980–81)	1–1–1
4	W	October 18, 1980	4–2	@ Pittsburgh Penguins (1980–81)	2–1–1
5	L	October 19, 1980	2–4	Toronto Maple Leafs (1980–81)	2–2–1
6	W	October 22, 1980	7–4	Winnipeg Jets (1980–81)	3–2–1
7	W	October 25, 1980	5–2	@ Montreal Canadiens (1980–81)	4–2–1
8	W	October 26, 1980	5–2	New York Islanders (1980–81)	5–2–1
9	T	October 29, 1980	1–1	Pittsburgh Penguins (1980–81)	5–2–2

November

Game	Result	Date	Score	Opponent	Record
10	W	November 1, 1980	4–2	@ Detroit Red Wings (1980–81)	6–2–2
11	W	November 2, 1980	4–3	Vancouver Canucks (1980–81)	7–2–2
12	W	November 5, 1980	5–3	Colorado Rockies (1980–81)	8–2–2
13	T	November 8, 1980	3–3	@ Washington Capitals (1980–81)	8–2–3
14	T	November 9, 1980	3–3	Washington Capitals (1980–81)	8–2–4
15	T	November 12, 1980	4–4	Detroit Red Wings (1980–81)	8–2–5
16	L	November 15, 1980	1–4	@ New York Islanders (1980–81)	8–3–5
17	W	November 16, 1980	8–1	Quebec Nordiques (1980–81)	9–3–5
18	L	November 19, 1980	2–5	@ Chicago Black Hawks (1980–81)	9–4–5
19	W	November 21, 1980	4–2	@ Winnipeg Jets (1980–81)	10–4–5
20	L	November 23, 1980	3–6	@ Edmonton Oilers (1980–81)	10–5–5
21	L	November 25, 1980	3–5	@ St. Louis Blues (1980–81)	10–6–5
22	W	November 27, 1980	6–3	Calgary Flames (1980–81)	11–6–5
23	W	November 29, 1980	5–2	@ Hartford Whalers (1980–81)	12–6–5
24	W	November 30, 1980	4–1	Colorado Rockies (1980–81)	13–6–5

December

Game	Result	Date	Score	Opponent	Record
25	L	December 3, 1980	5–6	Montreal Canadiens (1980–81)	13–7–5
26	T	December 6, 1980	3–3	@ Minnesota North Stars (1980–81)	13–7–6
27	W	December 7, 1980	10–1	Pittsburgh Penguins (1980–81)	14–7–6
28	T	December 9, 1980	4–4	@ Colorado Rockies (1980–81)	14–7–7
29	L	December 11, 1980	4–8	@ Calgary Flames (1980–81)	14–8–7
30	W	December 13, 1980	5–4	@ Toronto Maple Leafs (1980–81)	15–8–7
31	T	December 14, 1980	2–2	Vancouver Canucks (1980–81)	15–8–8
32	W	December 20, 1980	7–4	@ Los Angeles Kings (1980–81)	16–8–8
33	T	December 21, 1980	3–3	@ Vancouver Canucks (1980–81)	16–8–9
34	W	December 26, 1980	3–2	Chicago Black Hawks (1980–81)	17–8–9
35	W	December 28, 1980	5–2	Boston Bruins (1980–81)	18–8–9
36	L	December 31, 1980	2–5	Los Angeles Kings (1980–81)	18–9–9

January

Game	Result	Date	Score	Opponent	Record
37	T	January 3, 1981	3–3	@ Quebec Nordiques (1980–81)	18–9–10
38	T	January 4, 1981	2–2	Minnesota North Stars (1980–81)	18–9–11
39	W	January 7, 1981	5–1	Quebec Nordiques (1980–81)	19–9–11
40	T	January 9, 1981	3–3	@ New York Rangers (1980–81)	19–9–12
41	T	January 11, 1981	4–4	Los Angeles Kings (1980–81)	19–9–13
42	T	January 14, 1981	1–1	Minnesota North Stars (1980–81)	19–9–14
43	T	January 16, 1981	5–5	Edmonton Oilers (1980–81)	19–9–15
44	W	January 18, 1981	4–0	New York Rangers (1980–81)	20–9–15
45	L	January 19, 1981	1–5	@ Boston Bruins (1980–81)	20–10–15
46	W	January 21, 1981	6–5	@ Quebec Nordiques (1980–81)	21–10–15
47	W	January 24, 1981	7–4	@ Washington Capitals (1980–81)	22–10–15
48	W	January 26, 1981	5–3	@ New York Islanders (1980–81)	23–10–15
49	T	January 28, 1981	4–4	Philadelphia Flyers (1980–81)	23–10–16
50	W	January 31, 1981	5–3	@ Hartford Whalers (1980–81)	24–10–16

February

Game	Result	Date	Score	Opponent	Record
51	W	February 1, 1981	4–0	Winnipeg Jets (1980–81)	25–10–16
52	W	February 5, 1981	4–0	@ Philadelphia Flyers (1980–81)	26–10–16
53	W	February 6, 1981	7–3	Detroit Red Wings (1980–81)	27–10–16
54	T	February 8, 1981	3–3	St. Louis Blues (1980–81)	27–10–17
55	W	February 12, 1981	6–3	Washington Capitals (1980–81)	28–10–17
56	T	February 14, 1981	4–4	@ Calgary Flames (1980–81)	28–10–18
57	T	February 15, 1981	2–2	@ Edmonton Oilers (1980–81)	28–10–19
58	L	February 19, 1981	2–5	@ Montreal Canadiens (1980–81)	28–11–19
59	W	February 21, 1981	6–1	@ Pittsburgh Penguins (1980–81)	29–11–19
60	L	February 22, 1981	2–4	Montreal Canadiens (1980–81)	29–12–19
61	L	February 25, 1981	3–6	@ New York Rangers (1980–81)	29–13–19
62	W	February 27, 1981	6–1	Chicago Black Hawks (1980–81)	30–13–19

March

Game	Result	Date	Score	Opponent	Record
63	L	March 1, 1981	4–6	@ Boston Bruins (1980–81)	30–14–19
64	W	March 4, 1981	4–0	Calgary Flames (1980–81)	31–14–19
65	L	March 6, 1981	3–5	Hartford Whalers (1980–81)	31–15–19
66	W	March 8, 1981	8–4	Philadelphia Flyers (1980–81)	32–15–19
67	L	March 11, 1981	1–3	@ Minnesota North Stars (1980–81)	32–16–19
68	W	March 13, 1981	5–2	@ Winnipeg Jets (1980–81)	33–16–19
69	L	March 14, 1981	1–2	@ Vancouver Canucks (1980–81)	33–17–19
70	W	March 17, 1981	3–1	@ Los Angeles Kings (1980–81)	34–17–19
71	W	March 19, 1981	14–4	Toronto Maple Leafs (1980–81)	35–17–19
72	W	March 21, 1981	6–2	@ Toronto Maple Leafs (1980–81)	36–17–19
73	L	March 22, 1981	5–6	St. Louis Blues (1980–81)	36–18–19
74	W	March 25, 1981	4–2	New York Rangers (1980–81)	37–18–19
75	W	March 27, 1981	5–3	@ Colorado Rockies (1980–81)	38–18–19
76	L	March 28, 1981	4–7	@ St. Louis Blues (1980–81)	38–19–19
77	T	March 30, 1981	2–2	Boston Bruins (1980–81)	38–19–20

April

Game	Result	Date	Score	Opponent	Record
78	T	April 2, 1981	2–2	@ Philadelphia Flyers (1980–81)	38–19–21
79	W	April 4, 1981	5–4	@ Detroit Red Wings (1980–81)	39–19–21
80	L	April 5, 1981	3–7	New York Islanders (1980–81)	39–20–21

Legend: Win (2 points) Loss (0 points) Tie (1 point)

== Transactions ==
The Sabres were involved in the following transactions during the 1980–81 season.

=== Trades ===
October 30, 1980	To Buffalo Sabres Bob Hess; 4th round pick in 1981 – Anders Wikberg	To St. Louis Blues Bill Stewart
March 10, 1981	To Buffalo Sabres 6th round pick in 1982 – Jakob Gustavsson; Cash	To Los Angeles Kings Don Luce
March 10, 1981	To Buffalo Sabres 3rd round pick in 1981 – Colin Chishom; 1st round pick in 1983 – Tom Barrasso	To Los Angeles Kings Rick Martin

=== Waivers ===
July 1, 1980	From Edmonton Oilers Ron Carter
January 12, 1981	To Winnipeg Jets Rick Dudley

=== Free agent signings ===
June 26, 1980	From Edmonton Oilers John Bednarski
March 19, 1981	From Calgary Dinos (CIAU) Ron Fischer

== Draft picks ==
Buffalo's draft picks at the 1980 NHL entry draft held at the Montreal Forum in Montreal.

Round	#	Player	Nationality	College/Junior/Club team (League)
1	20	Steve Patrick	Canada	Brandon Wheat Kings (WHL)
2	41	Mike Moller	Canada	Lethbridge Broncos (WHL)
3	56	Sean McKenna	Canada	Sherbrooke Castors (QMJHL)
3	62	Jay North	United States	Bloomington Jefferson High School (USHS-MN)
4	83	Jim Wiemer	Canada	Peterborough Petes (OMJHL)
5	104	Dirk Reuter	Canada	Sault Ste. Marie Greyhounds (OMJHL)
6	125	Daniel Naud	Canada	Sorel Eperviers (QMJHL)
7	146	Jari Paavola	Finland	TPS (Finland)
8	167	Randy Cunneyworth	Canada	Ottawa 67's (OMJHL)
9	188	Dave Beckon	Canada	Peterborough Petes (OMJHL)
10	209	John Bader	United States	Irondale High School (USHS-MN)

== See also ==
- 1980–81 NHL season
