= Larry Lozinski =

Canadian ice hockey player (born 1958)

- Born: October 16, 1958 (age 66); Hudson Bay, Saskatchewan, Canada
- Height: 5 ft 11 in (180 cm)
- Weight: 175 lb (79 kg; 12 st 7 lb)
- Position: Goaltender
- Caught: Right
- Played for: Detroit Red Wings
- NHL draft: 219th overall, 1978; Detroit Red Wings
- Playing career: 1977–1983

Lawrence Peter Lozinski (born October 16, 1958) is a Canadian former ice hockey goaltender who played 30 games in the National Hockey League with the Detroit Red Wings during the 1980–81 season.

== Career statistics ==
=== Regular season and playoffs ===
			Regular season									Playoffs
Season	Team	League	GP	W	L	T	MIN	GA	SO	GAA	SV%	GP	W	L	MIN	GA	SO	GAA	SV%
1975–76	Maple Ridge Blazers	BCJHL	34	—	—	—	2122	116	1	3.28	—	—	—	—	—	—	—	—	—
1976–77	Abbotsford Flyers	BCJHL	65	28	34	3	3897	294	4	4.53	—	—	—	—	—	—	—	—	—
1976–77	New Westminster Bruins	WCHL	3	2	0	0	148	5	0	2.03	.941	1	—	—	—	—	—	7.50	.800
1977–78	New Westminster Bruins	WCHL	3	2	1	0	180	18	0	6.00	.879	—	—	—	—	—	—	—	—
1977–78	Flin Flon Bombers	WCHL	37	14	17	5	1939	178	0	5.51	.876	16	—	—	941	86	0	5.48	.874
1978–79	Kansas City Red Wings	CHL	13	4	6	1	688	45	0	3.92	.891	—	—	—	—	—	—	—	—
1979–80	Kalamazoo Wings	IHL	69	—	—	—	4000	232	5	3.48	—	10	—	—	597	24	1	2.41	—
1980–81	Detroit Red Wings	NHL	30	6	11	7	1455	104	0	4.29	.858	—	—	—	—	—	—	—	—
1980–81	Adirondack Red Wings	AHL	16	4	9	1	789	53	0	4.03	.881	—	—	—	—	—	—	—	—
1981–82	Adirondack Red Wings	AHL	55	25	23	4	3207	175	1	3.27	—	5	—	—	280	22	0	4.71	—
1982–83	Adirondack Red Wings	AHL	32	13	15	2	1709	128	3	4.49	.854	6	2	4	390	22	0	3.38	—
1982–83	Kalamazoo Wings	IHL	12	—	—	—	674	51	0	4.54	—	—	—	—	—	—	—	—	—
NHL totals			30	6	11	7	1455	104	0	4.29	.858	—	—	—	—	—	—	—	—
