= 1980–81 NHL season =

National Hockey League season

- League: National Hockey League
- Sport: Ice hockey
- Duration: October 9, 1980 – May 21, 1981
- Games: 80
- Teams: 21
- TV partner(s): CBC, SRC (Canada); USA, ESPN (United States)

Draft
- Top draft pick: Doug Wickenheiser
- Picked by: Montreal Canadiens

Regular season
- Season champions: New York Islanders
- Season MVP: Wayne Gretzky (Oilers)
- Top scorer: Wayne Gretzky (Oilers)

Playoffs
- Playoffs MVP: Butch Goring (Islanders)

Stanley Cup
- Champions: New York Islanders
- Runners-up: Minnesota North Stars

NHL seasons
- 1979–80 1981–82

The 1980–81 NHL season was the 64th season of the National Hockey League. The Flames relocated from Atlanta to Calgary. The New York Islanders were the top regular season team and the top playoff team, winning their second consecutive Stanley Cup by defeating the Minnesota North Stars in five games.

== Entry draft ==
The 1980 NHL entry draft was held on June 11, at the Montreal Forum in Montreal, Quebec. This was the first draft opened to the public. Doug Wickenheiser was selected first overall by the Montreal Canadiens.

== Arena changes ==
The Flames relocated from the Omni Coliseum in Atlanta, Georgia to the Stampede Corral in Calgary, Alberta.

== Regular season ==
The season featured notable individual scoring milestones.

Wayne Gretzky of the Edmonton Oilers broke Bobby Orr's single season assist record, scoring 109 assists, and Phil Esposito's point record, scoring 164 points. He won his second of an unmatched eight straight Hart Trophies as the league's most valuable player

Mike Bossy of the New York Islanders became only the second man in NHL history to score 50 goals in his first 50 games. In the 50th game, played at his home rink, he had 48 goals going into the third and final period (before the advent of overtime games). Bossy admitted being so embarrassed and upset that he contemplated not going out on the ice for the final period. However, Bossy got his 49th goal with 5:15 left to go in the game and the 50th with 1:50 remaining, sending the Nassau Coliseum into a delirium. Maurice Richard, the only other man to accomplish this feat, was on hand to congratulate him.

Bossy's Islanders finished as regular season champions with 110 points with the St. Louis Blues finishing a close second at 107 points.

=== Final standings ===
Note: GP = Games played, W = Wins, L = Losses, T = Ties, Pts = Points, GF = Goals for, GA = Goals against, PIM = Penalties in minutes
Note: Teams that qualified for the playoffs are highlighted in bold

League standings
R		Div	GP	W	L	T	GF	GA	Pts
1	**p – New York Islanders**	PTK	80	48	18	14	355	260	110
2	**x – St. Louis Blues**	SMY	80	45	18	17	352	281	107
3	**y – Montreal Canadiens**	NRS	80	45	22	13	332	232	103
4	**Los Angeles Kings**	NRS	80	43	24	13	337	290	99
5	**x – Buffalo Sabres**	ADM	80	39	20	21	327	250	99
6	**Philadelphia Flyers**	PTK	80	41	24	15	313	249	97
7	**Calgary Flames**	PTK	80	39	27	14	329	298	92
8	**Boston Bruins**	ADM	80	37	30	13	316	272	87
9	**Minnesota North Stars**	ADM	80	35	28	17	291	263	87
10	**Chicago Black Hawks**	SMY	80	31	33	16	304	315	78
11	**Quebec Nordiques**	ADM	80	30	32	18	314	318	78
12	**Vancouver Canucks**	SMY	80	28	32	20	289	301	76
13	**New York Rangers**	PTK	80	30	36	14	312	317	74
14	**Edmonton Oilers**	SMY	80	29	35	16	328	327	74
15	**Pittsburgh Penguins**	NRS	80	30	37	13	302	345	73
16	**Toronto Maple Leafs**	ADM	80	28	37	15	322	367	71
17	Washington Capitals	PTK	80	26	36	18	286	317	70
18	Hartford Whalers	NRS	80	21	41	18	292	372	60
19	Colorado Rockies	SMY	80	22	45	13	258	344	57
20	Detroit Red Wings	NRS	80	19	43	18	252	339	56
21	Winnipeg Jets	SMY	80	9	57	14	246	400	32

Divisions: ADM – Adams, NRS – Norris, PTK – Patrick, SMY – Smythe

bold – The top 16 teams in the league qualified for the playoffs, regardless of division or conference.
x – Won division; y – Won Conference (and division); p – Won Presidents' Trophy (and conference and division)

==== Prince of Wales Conference ====
Adams Division
	GP	W	L	T	GF	GA	Pts
**Buffalo Sabres**	80	39	20	21	327	250	99
**Boston Bruins**	80	37	30	13	316	272	87
**Minnesota North Stars**	80	35	28	17	291	263	87
**Quebec Nordiques**	80	30	32	18	314	318	78
**Toronto Maple Leafs**	80	28	37	15	322	367	71

Norris Division
	GP	W	L	T	GF	GA	Pts
**Montreal Canadiens**	80	45	22	13	332	232	103
**Los Angeles Kings**	80	43	24	13	337	290	99
**Pittsburgh Penguins**	80	30	37	13	302	345	73
Hartford Whalers	80	21	41	18	292	372	60
Detroit Red Wings	80	19	43	18	252	339	56

==== Clarence Campbell Conference ====
Patrick Division
	GP	W	L	T	GF	GA	Pts
**New York Islanders**	80	48	18	14	355	260	110
**Philadelphia Flyers**	80	41	24	15	313	249	97
**Calgary Flames**	80	39	27	14	329	298	92
**New York Rangers**	80	30	36	14	312	317	74
Washington Capitals	80	26	36	18	286	317	70

Smythe Division
	GP	W	L	T	GF	GA	Pts
**St. Louis Blues**	80	45	18	17	352	281	107
**Chicago Black Hawks**	80	31	33	16	304	315	78
**Vancouver Canucks**	80	28	32	20	289	301	76
**Edmonton Oilers**	80	29	35	16	328	327	74
Colorado Rockies	80	22	45	13	258	344	57
Winnipeg Jets	80	9	57	14	246	400	32

== Playoffs ==
=== Bracket ===
The top 16 teams in the league made the playoffs, and were seeded 1–16, regardless of division or conference. The NHL used "re-seeding" instead of a fixed bracket playoff system: in each round, the highest remaining seed played against the lowest remaining seed, the second-highest remaining seed faced the second-lowest remaining seed, and so forth.

In the preliminary round, teams competed in a best-of-five series. In the other three rounds, teams competed in a best-of-seven series (scores in the bracket indicate the number of games won in each series).

Preliminary Round
1	NY Islanders	3
16	Toronto	0
2	St. Louis	3
15	Pittsburgh	2
3	Montreal	0
14	Edmonton	3
4	Los Angeles	1
13	NY Rangers	3
5	Buffalo	3
12	Vancouver	0
6	Philadelphia	3
11	Quebec	2
7	Calgary	3
10	Chicago	0
8	Boston	0
9	Minnesota	3

Quarterfinals
1	NY Islanders	4
8	Edmonton	2
2	St. Louis	2
7	NY Rangers	4
3	Buffalo	1
6	Minnesota	4
4	Philadelphia	3
5	Calgary	4

Semifinals
1	NY Islanders	4
4	NY Rangers	0
2	Calgary	2
3	Minnesota	4

Stanley Cup Finals
1	NY Islanders	4
3	Minnesota	1

== Awards ==
1981 NHL awards
Prince of Wales Trophy: (Wales Conference regular season champion)	Montreal Canadiens
Clarence S. Campbell Bowl: (Campbell Conference regular season champion)	New York Islanders
Art Ross Trophy: (Top scorer, regular season)	Wayne Gretzky, Edmonton Oilers
Bill Masterton Memorial Trophy: (Perseverance, sportsmanship, and dedication)	Blake Dunlop, St. Louis Blues
Calder Memorial Trophy: (Top first-year player)	Peter Stastny, Quebec Nordiques
Conn Smythe Trophy: (Most valuable player, playoffs)	Butch Goring, New York Islanders
Frank J. Selke Trophy: (Top defensive forward)	Bob Gainey, Montreal Canadiens
Hart Memorial Trophy: (Most valuable player, regular season)	Wayne Gretzky, Edmonton Oilers
Jack Adams Award: (Best coach)	Gordon "Red" Berenson, St. Louis Blues
James Norris Memorial Trophy: (Best defenceman)	Randy Carlyle, Pittsburgh Penguins
Lady Byng Memorial Trophy: (Excellence and sportsmanship)	Rick Kehoe, Pittsburgh Penguins
Lester B. Pearson Award: (Outstanding player, regular season)	Mike Liut, St. Louis Blues
Vezina Trophy: (Goaltender(s) of team(s) with best goaltending record)	Denis Herron, Michel Larocque, & Richard Sevigny, Montreal Canadiens

=== All-Star teams ===
First Team	Position	Second Team
Mike Liut, St. Louis Blues	G	Mario Lessard, Los Angeles Kings
Denis Potvin, New York Islanders	D	Larry Robinson, Montreal Canadiens
Randy Carlyle, Pittsburgh Penguins	D	Ray Bourque, Boston Bruins
Wayne Gretzky, Edmonton Oilers	C	Marcel Dionne, Los Angeles Kings
Mike Bossy, New York Islanders	RW	Dave Taylor, Los Angeles Kings
Charlie Simmer, Los Angeles Kings	LW	Bill Barber, Philadelphia Flyers

== Player statistics ==
=== Scoring leaders ===
Note: GP = Games played; G = Goals; A = Assists; Pts = Points

Player	Team	GP	G	A	Pts	PIM
Wayne Gretzky	Edmonton Oilers	80	55	109	164	28
Marcel Dionne	Los Angeles Kings	80	58	77	135	70
Kent Nilsson	Calgary Flames	80	49	82	131	26
Mike Bossy	New York Islanders	79	68	51	119	32
Dave Taylor	Los Angeles Kings	72	47	65	112	130
Peter Stastny	Quebec Nordiques	77	39	70	109	37
Charlie Simmer	Los Angeles Kings	65	56	49	105	62
Mike Rogers	Hartford Whalers	80	40	65	105	32
Bernie Federko	St. Louis Blues	78	31	73	104	47
Jacques Richard	Quebec Nordiques	78	52	51	103	39
Rick Middleton	Boston Bruins	80	44	59	103	16
Bryan Trottier	New York Islanders	73	31	72	103	74

Source: NHL.

=== Leading goaltenders ===
Player	Team	GP	MIN	GA	SO	GAA	SV%
Richard Sevigny	Montreal	33	1777	71	2	2.40	.908
Rick St. Croix	Philadelphia	27	1567	65	2	2.49	.913
Don Edwards	Buffalo	45	2700	133	3	2.96	.898
Pete Peeters	Philadelphia	40	2333	115	2	2.96	.897
Bob Sauve	Buffalo	35	2100	111	2	3.17	.880
Don Beaupre	Minnesota	44	2585	138	0	3.20	.889
Glenn Resch	New York/Colorado	40	2266	121	3	3.20	.891
Reggie Lemelin	Calgary	29	1629	88	2	3.24	.902
Gilles Meloche	Minnesota	38	2215	120	2	3.25	.889
Mario Lessard	Los Angeles	64	3746	203	2	3.25	.893

== Coaches ==
=== Patrick Division ===
- Calgary Flames: Al MacNeil
- New York Islanders: Al Arbour
- New York Rangers: Fred Shero and Craig Patrick
- Philadelphia Flyers: Pat Quinn
- Washington Capitals: Gary Green

=== Adams Division ===
- Boston Bruins: Gerry Cheevers
- Buffalo Sabres: Scotty Bowman
- Minnesota North Stars: Glen Sonmor
- Quebec Nordiques: Maurice Filion and Michel Bergeron
- Toronto Maple Leafs: Joe Crozier and Mike Nykoluk

=== Norris Division ===
- Detroit Red Wings: Wayne Maxner
- Hartford Whalers: Don Blackburn
- Los Angeles Kings: Bob Berry
- Montreal Canadiens: Claude Ruel
- Pittsburgh Penguins: Eddie Johnston

=== Smythe Division ===
- Chicago Black Hawks: Keith Magnuson
- Colorado Rockies: Bill MacMillan
- Edmonton Oilers: Bryan Watson
- St. Louis Blues: Red Berenson
- Vancouver Canucks: Harry Neale
- Winnipeg Jets: Mike Smith and Tom Watt

== Milestones ==
=== Debuts ===
The following is a list of players of note who played their first NHL game in 1980–81 (listed with their first team, asterisk(*) marks debut in playoffs):

- Barry Pederson, Boston Bruins
- Steve Kasper, Boston Bruins
- Denis Savard, Chicago Black Hawks
- Steve Larmer, Chicago Black Hawks
- Andy Moog, Edmonton Oilers
- Charlie Huddy, Edmonton Oilers
- Glenn Anderson, Edmonton Oilers
- Jari Kurri, Edmonton Oilers
- Paul Coffey, Edmonton Oilers
- Larry Murphy, Los Angeles Kings
- Dino Ciccarelli, Minnesota North Stars
- Don Beaupre, Minnesota North Stars
- Neal Broten, Minnesota North Stars
- Doug Wickenheiser, Montreal Canadiens
- Guy Carbonneau, Montreal Canadiens
- Rick Wamsley, Montreal Canadiens
- Brent Sutter, New York Islanders
- Rollie Melanson, New York Islanders
- Tim Kerr, Philadelphia Flyers
- Mike Bullard, Pittsburgh Penguins
- Anton Stastny, Quebec Nordiques
- Peter Stastny, Quebec Nordiques
- Dale Hunter, Quebec Nordiques
- Paul MacLean, St. Louis Blues
- Dave Babych, Winnipeg Jets

=== Last games ===
The following is a list of players of note that played their last game in the NHL in 1980–81 (listed with their last team):

- Jean Ratelle, Boston Bruins
- Terry Harper, Colorado Rockies
- Pete Mahovlich, Detroit Red Wings
- Tom Bladon, Detroit Red Wings
- Phil Esposito, New York Rangers
- Walt Tkaczuk, New York Rangers
- Ron Ellis, Toronto Maple Leafs
- Dennis Kearns, Vancouver Canucks
- Bobby Schmautz, Vancouver Canucks
- Dennis Ververgaert, Washington Capitals
- Guy Charron, Washington Capitals
- Wayne Stephenson, Washington Capitals
- Jude Drouin, Winnipeg Jets

== Broadcasting ==
Hockey Night in Canada on CBC Television televised Saturday night regular season games and Stanley Cup playoff games.

This was the first season that U.S. national broadcasts were only on cable television. ESPN and USA continued to carry slates of regular season and playoff games for the second consecutive season.

== See also ==
- 33rd National Hockey League All-Star Game
- 1980 NHL entry draft
- 1980–81 NHL transactions
- 1980 in sports
- 1981 in sports
- List of Stanley Cup champions
- National Hockey League All-Star Game
