= 1982–83 NHL transactions =

The following is a list of all team-to-team transactions that have occurred in the National Hockey League during the 1982–83 NHL season. It lists what team each player has been traded to, signed by, or claimed by, and for which player(s) or draft pick(s), if applicable.

== Trades between teams ==
=== June ===
June 3, 1982	To Calgary Flames Kari Eloranta	To St. Louis Blues cash
June 3, 1982	To Vancouver Canucks cash	To St. Louis Blues Rick Heinz
June 7, 1982	To Minnesota North Stars Willi Plett; 4th-rd pick - 1982 entry draft (# 81 - Dusan Pasek)	To Calgary Flames Steve Christoff; Bill Nyrop; 2nd-rd pick - 1982 entry draft (# 29 - Dave Reierson)
June 8, 1982	To Buffalo Sabres 1st-rd pick - 1982 entry draft (# 9 - Paul Cyr); 2nd-rd pick - 1982 entry draft (# 30 - Jens Johansson); 2nd-rd pick - 1983 entry draft (# 31 - John Tucker); Sabres' option to swap 1st-rd picks - 1983 entry draft (# 10 - Normand Lacombe)^{1}	To Calgary Flames Richie Dunn; Don Edwards; 2nd-rd pick - 1982 entry draft (# 37 - Richard Kromm)
June 9, 1982	To Boston Bruins Pete Peeters	To Philadelphia Flyers Brad McCrimmon
June 9, 1982	To Boston Bruins Brad Palmer rights to Dave Donnelly	To Minnesota North Stars Bruins agreed not to select Brian Bellows in the 1982 entry draft
June 9, 1982	To New Jersey Devils 1st-rd pick - 1982 entry draft (# 8 - Rocky Trottier); 1st-rd pick - 1983 entry draft (# 6 - John MacLean)	To St. Louis Blues Rob Ramage
June 9, 1982	To Buffalo Sabres 2nd-rd pick - 1982 entry draft (# 26 - Mike Anderson); 4th-rd pick - 1982 entry draft (# 68 - Timo Jutila)	To Washington Capitals Alan Haworth; 3rd-rd pick - 1982 entry draft (# 58 - Milan Novy)
June 9, 1982	To Calgary Flames Howard Walker; George White; 6th-rd pick - 1982 entry draft (# 118 - Mats Kihlstrom); 3rd-rd pick - 1983 entry draft (# 55 - Perry Berezan); 2nd-rd pick - 1984 entry draft (# 38 - Paul Ranheim)	To Washington Capitals Ken Houston; Pat Riggin
June 9, 1982	To Buffalo Sabres 12th-rd pick - 1983 entry draft (# 235 - Kermit Salfi)	To Washington Capitals 12th-rd pick - 1982 entry draft (# 247 - Marco Kallas)
June 9, 1982	To Minnesota North Stars 11th-rd pick - 1983 entry draft (# 212 - Oldrich Valek)	To Quebec Nordiques 12th-rd pick - 1982 entry draft (# 248 - Jan Jasko)

1. Buffalo exercised the option and swap the 13th pick for the 10th overall pick in 1983.

=== July ===
July 2, 1982	To New Jersey Devils Ed Cooper	To Edmonton Oilers Stan Weir

=== August ===
August 4, 1982	To Minnesota North Stars Rollie Boutin; Wes Jarvis	To Washington Capitals Robbie Moore; 11th-rd pick - 1983 entry draft (# 216 - Anders Huss)
August 4, 1982	To Quebec Nordiques Rick Lapointe	To St. Louis Blues Pat Hickey
August 19, 1982	To Hartford Whalers Greg Adams; Ken Linseman; 1st-rd pick - 1983 entry draft (# 20 - David Jensen); 3rd-rd pick - 1983 entry draft (# 61 - Leif Carlsson)	To Philadelphia Flyers Mark Howe; 3rd-rd pick - 1983 entry draft (# 44 - Derrick Smith)
August 19, 1982	To Hartford Whalers Risto Siltanen rights to Brent Loney	To Edmonton Oilers Ken Linseman; Don Nachbaur
August 23, 1982	To Minnesota North Stars Dan McCarthy	To New York Rangers Shawn Dineen
August 24, 1982	To Chicago Black Hawks 6th-rd pick - 1983 entry draft (# 115 - Jari Torkki); 5th-rd pick - 1984 entry draft (# 101 - Darin Sceviour)	To Washington Capitals Ted Bulley; Dave Hutchison

=== September ===
September 9, 1982	To Toronto Maple Leafs Mike Palmateer	To Washington Capitals cash
September 9, 1982	To Montreal Canadiens Rick Green; Ryan Walter	To Washington Capitals Brian Engblom; Doug Jarvis; Rod Langway; Craig Laughlin
September 10, 1982	To Montreal Canadiens 2nd-rd pick - 1983 entry draft (# 35 - Todd Francis); 3rd-rd pick - 1984 entry draft (# 54 - Graeme Bonar)	To Calgary Flames Doug Risebrough; 2nd-rd pick - 1983 entry draft (MIN - # 38 - Frank Musil)^{1}
September 14, 1982	To Edmonton Oilers cash	To Detroit Red Wings Stan Weir
September 15, 1982	To Montreal Canadiens 3rd-rd pick - 1985 entry draft (STL - # 44 - Nelson Emerson)^{2}	To Pittsburgh Penguins Denis Herron
September 18, 1982	To New Jersey Devils future considerations	To Calgary Flames Steve Janaszak
September 27, 1982	To Minnesota North Stars Frank Beaton	To New York Islanders future considerations

1. Calgary's second-round pick went to Minnesota as the result of a trade on June 8, 1982 that sent Mike Eaves and Keith Hanson to Calgary in exchange for Steve Christoff and an optional second-round pick in 1983 entry draft (this pick) or in 1984 entry draft.
2. Montreal's second-round pick went to St. Louis as the result of a trade on June 15, 1985 that sent St. Louis' first-round, second-round, fourth-round, fifth-round and sixth-round picks in 1985 entry draft to Montreal in exchange for Mike Dark, Mark Hunter, Montreal's second-round, fifth-round, sixth-round picks in 1985 entry draft and this pick.

=== October ===
October 1, 1982	To Hartford Whalers Kent-Erik Andersson; Mark Johnson	To Minnesota North Stars Jordy Douglas; 5th-rd pick - 1984 entry draft (# 89 - Jiri Poner)
October 1, 1982	To Hartford Whalers Ed Hospodar	To New York Rangers Kent-Erik Andersson
October 1, 1982	To New Jersey Devils Hector Marini; 4th-rd pick - 1983 entry draft (CGY - # 77 - Bill Claviter)^{1}	To New York Islanders 4th-rd pick - 1983 entry draft (# 65 - Mikko Makela)
October 1, 1982	To Hartford Whalers future considerations	To Boston Bruins Marty Howe
October 5, 1982	To Toronto Maple Leafs 10th-rd pick - 1983 entry draft (# 184 - Greg Rolston)	To Hartford Whalers Paul Marshall
October 15, 1982	To New Jersey Devils Garry Howatt; Rick Meagher	To Hartford Whalers Merlin Malinowski rights to Scott Fusco
October 19, 1982	To Toronto Maple Leafs Greg Terrion	To Los Angeles Kings 4th-rd pick - 1983 entry draft (DET - # 68 - Dave Korol)^{2}
October 22, 1982	To Edmonton Oilers Peter Dineen	To Philadelphia Flyers Bob Hoffmeyer
October 24, 1982	To Los Angeles Kings Terry Ruskowski	To Chicago Black Hawks Larry Goodenough; 3rd-rd pick - 1984 entry draft (# 45 - Trent Yawney)
October 28, 1982	To Minnesota North Stars George Ferguson; 1st-rd pick - 1983 entry draft (# 1 - Brian Lawton)	To Pittsburgh Penguins Anders Hakansson; Ron Meighan; 1st-rd pick - 1983 entry draft (# 15 - Bob Errey)
October 29, 1982	To New Jersey Devils cash	To Detroit Red Wings rights to Dwight Foster

1. New Jersey's' fourth-round pick went to Calgary as the result of a trade on November 25, 1981 that sent Don Lever and Bob MacMillan to Colorado in exchange for Lanny McDonald and this pick. The Colorado Rockies relocated to New Jersey to become the Devils for the 1982-83 NHL season.
2. Los Angeles' fourth-round pick went to Detroit as the result of a trade on June 8, 1983 that sent Detroit's fourth-round pick in 1984 entry draft to Los Angeles in exchange for this pick.

=== November ===
November 8, 1982	To Boston Bruins cash	To Pittsburgh Penguins Stan Jonathan
November 8, 1982	To Calgary Flames rights to Carey Wilson	To Chicago Black Hawks Denis Cyr

=== December ===
December 2, 1982	To Calgary Flames rights to Yves Courteau	To Detroit Red Wings Bobby Francis
December 3, 1982	To Hartford Whalers Pierre Lacroix	To Quebec Nordiques Blake Wesley
December 7, 1982	To Los Angeles Kings Rick Blight	To Edmonton Oilers Alan Hangsleben
December 17, 1982	To Toronto Maple Leafs Gaston Gingras	To Montreal Canadiens 2nd-rd pick - 1986 entry draft (# 27 - Benoit Brunet)
December 17, 1982	To Toronto Maple Leafs Dan Daoust	To Montreal Canadiens 3rd-rd pick - 1984 entry draft (MIN - # 46 - Ken Hodge, Jr.)^{1}

1. The Montreal's third-round pick went to the Minnesota as the result of a trade on October 28, 1983 that sent the Booby Smith to Montreal in exchange for Keith Acton, Mark Napier and this pick.

=== January ===
January 4, 1983	To St. Louis Blues Andre Dore	To New York Rangers Glen Hanlon; Vaclav Nedomansky
January 6, 1983	To Vancouver Canucks Tony Tanti	To Chicago Black Hawks Curt Fraser
January 10, 1983	To Toronto Maple Leafs cash	To Minnesota North Stars Dave Logan
January 10, 1983	To Toronto Maple Leafs Rick St. Croix	To Philadelphia Flyers Michel Larocque
January 15, 1983	To Toronto Maple Leafs Reid Bailey	To Edmonton Oilers Serge Boisvert
January 17, 1983	To Vancouver Canucks Mark Kirton	To Detroit Red Wings Ivan Boldirev
January 23, 1983	To Toronto Maple Leafs Dave Snopek	To Chicago Black Hawks Rod Willard

=== February ===
February 1, 1983	To Minnesota North Stars 3rd-rd pick - 1985 entry draft (# 51 - Stephane Roy)	To Los Angeles Kings Markus Mattsson
February 4, 1983	To Quebec Nordiques Anders Eldebrink	To Vancouver Canucks John Garrett
February 19, 1983	To New Jersey Devils Ron Low; Jim McTaggart	To Edmonton Oilers Lindsay Middlebrook; Paul Miller

=== March ===
- Trading Deadline: March 8, 1983

March 7, 1983	To Edmonton Oilers Willy Lindstrom	To Winnipeg Jets Laurie Boschman
March 8, 1983	To Minnesota North Stars future considerations	To Detroit Red Wings Ken Solheim

== Additional sources ==
- hockeydb.com - search for player and select "show trades"
- "NHL trades for 1982-1983". NHL Trade Tracker.
