= 1981 Stanley Cup playoffs =

Game season

Tournament details
- Dates: April 8–May 21, 1981
- Teams: 16
- Defending champions: New York Islanders

Final positions
- Champions: New York Islanders
- Runners-up: Minnesota North Stars

Tournament statistics
- Scoring leader(s): Mike Bossy (Islanders) (35 points)

Awards
- MVP: Butch Goring (Isalnders)

The 1981 Stanley Cup playoffs, the playoff tournament of the National Hockey League (NHL) began on April 8, after the conclusion of the 1980–81 NHL season. The playoffs concluded on May 21 with the champion New York Islanders defeating the Minnesota North Stars 5–1 to win the final series four games to one and win the Stanley Cup.

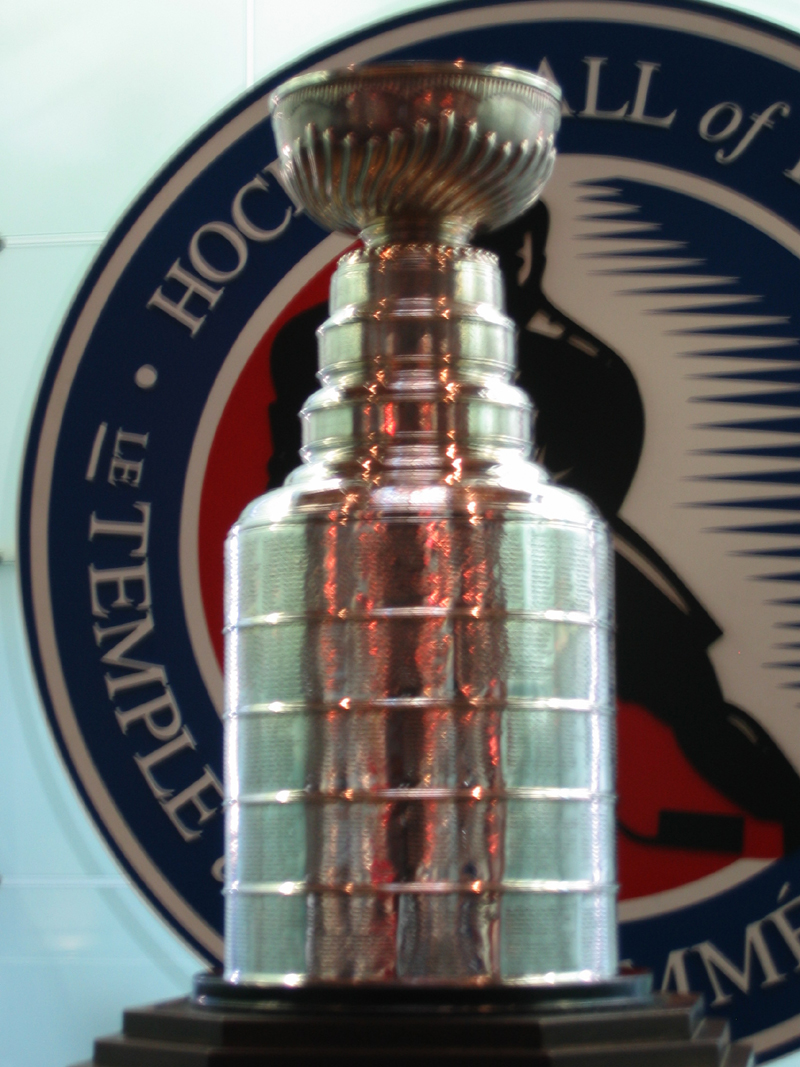
The Stanley Cup

In game one of the Edmonton-Montreal series, Wayne Gretzky recorded five assists, at the time this was a single game playoff record.

These were the last Stanley Cup playoffs conducted under a format that paired teams in each round without regard to division or conference standing; the 2021 playoffs, however, mostly disregarded the conference setups, while mostly keeping the usual divisional format in place.

== Playoff seeds ==
The top 16 teams in the league qualified for the playoffs, and were seeded 1–16 based on regular season points, regardless of conference or division, as follows:

1. New York Islanders, Patrick Division champions, Clarence Campbell Conference regular season champions, NHL regular season champions – 110 points
2. St. Louis Blues, Smythe Division champions – 107 points
3. Montreal Canadiens, Norris Division champions, Prince of Wales Conference regular season champions – 103 points
4. Los Angeles Kings – 99 points (43 wins)
5. Buffalo Sabres, Adams Division champions – 99 points (39 wins)
6. Philadelphia Flyers – 97 points
7. Calgary Flames – 92 points
8. Boston Bruins – 87 points (37 wins)
9. Minnesota North Stars – 87 points (35 wins)
10. Chicago Black Hawks – 78 points (31 wins)
11. Quebec Nordiques – 78 points (30 wins)
12. Vancouver Canucks – 76 points
13. New York Rangers – 74 points (30 wins)
14. Edmonton Oilers – 74 points (29 wins)
15. Pittsburgh Penguins – 73 points
16. Toronto Maple Leafs – 71 points

== Playoff bracket ==
The NHL used "re-seeding" instead of a fixed bracket playoff system: in each round, the highest remaining seed was matched against the lowest remaining seed, the second-highest remaining seed played the second-lowest remaining seed, and so forth.

Each series in the Preliminary Round was played in a best-of-five format while each series in the other three rounds were played in a best-of-seven format.

Preliminary Round
1	NY Islanders	3
16	Toronto	0
2	St. Louis	3
15	Pittsburgh	2
3	Montreal	0
14	Edmonton	3
4	Los Angeles	1
13	NY Rangers	3
5	Buffalo	3
12	Vancouver	0
6	Philadelphia	3
11	Quebec	2
7	Calgary	3
10	Chicago	0
8	Boston	0
9	Minnesota	3

Quarterfinals
1	NY Islanders	4
8	Edmonton	2
2	St. Louis	2
7	NY Rangers	4
3	Buffalo	1
6	Minnesota	4
4	Philadelphia	3
5	Calgary	4

Semifinals
1	NY Islanders	4
4	NY Rangers	0
2	Calgary	2
3	Minnesota	4

Stanley Cup Finals
1	NY Islanders	4
3	Minnesota	1

== Preliminary round ==
=== (1) New York Islanders vs. (16) Toronto Maple Leafs ===
The New York Islanders, the defending 1980 Stanley Cup champions, entered the playoffs as the regular season, Campbell Conference, and Patrick Division champions, earning 110 points. The Toronto Maple Leafs earned 71 points during the regular season to finish sixteenth overall in the league. This was the second playoff meeting between these two teams, with the only previous meeting being the 1978 Stanley Cup Quarterfinals, where Toronto defeated the Islanders in seven games. The Islanders won three of the four games in this year's regular season series.

Toronto was swept in the opening round of the playoffs for the second consecutive year. New York's series-clinching win in game three was the first (and to date only until the bubble in the 2020 playoffs) time that the Islanders have won a playoff game in Toronto, and this was the second (and to date, last) victory that a road team has ever earned in the three series between these two franchises. As of 2019, this series marks the only time that the Islanders have defeated Toronto in the Stanley Cup playoffs. In game one, the Islanders scored three times on the power play, and Bryan Trottier scored twice and added three assists in a decisive 9–2 victory. The Islanders dominance of the Maple Leafs continued in game two, as Trottier recorded a hat trick in a 5-1 Islanders win. The Islanders jumped all over the Maple Leafs quickly in game three, by jumping out to a 5–0 lead after the first period. The Maple Leafs and Islanders traded goals in the second period 19 seconds apart. Game three ended in a series-clinching 6-1 Islanders victory.

April 8	Toronto Maple Leafs	2–9	New York Islanders	Nassau Coliseum	Recap
No Scoring		First period	05:27 – sh – Billy Carroll (1); 11:26 – pp – Clark Gillies (1)
Bill Derlago (1) – pp – 01:39		Second period	07:34 – pp – Mike Bossy (1); 08:30 – Bryan Trottier (1); 10:17 – pp – Bryan Trottier (2); 19:06 – Bob Lorimer (1)
Ian Turnbull (1) – 17:00		Third period	02:25 – Mike Bossy (2); 07:25 – Bob Bourne (1); 11:30 – sh – Bob Bourne (2)
Jiri Crha 21 saves / 27 shots Michel Larocque 5 saves / 8 shots		Goalie stats	Billy Smith 29 saves / 30 shots Roland Melanson 10 saves / 11 shots

April 9	Toronto Maple Leafs	1–5	New York Islanders	Nassau Coliseum	Recap
No scoring		First period	No scoring
No scoring		Second period	07:39 – Mike Bossy (3); 08:18 – Bryan Trottier (3); 19:16 – pp – Bryan Trottier (4)
Bruce Boudreau (1) – 6:06		Third period	09:27 – Mike McEwen (1); 13:40 – Bryan Trottier (5)
Michel Larocque 19 saves / 24 shots Jiri Crha 3 saves / 3 shots		Goalie stats	Billy Smith 25 saves / 26 shots

April 11	New York Islanders	6–1	Toronto Maple Leafs	Maple Leaf Gardens	Recap
Wayne Merrick (1) – 08:58; Mike Bossy (4) – pp – 12:05; Hector Marini (1) – 14:03; Mike McEwen (2) – pp – 17:40; Clark Gillies (2) – 19:35		First period	No scoring
Bryan Trottier (6) – 13:34		Second period	13:53 – Rick Vaive (1)
No scoring		Third period	No scoring
Billy Smith 22 saves / 23 shots		Goalie stats	Jiri Crha 9 saves / 14 shots Paul Harrison 16 saves / 17 shots

New York won series 3–0

=== (2) St. Louis Blues vs. (15) Pittsburgh Penguins ===
The St. Louis Blues entered the playoffs as the Smythe Division champions, earning 107 points. The Pittsburgh Penguins earned 73 points during the regular season to finish fifteenth overall in the league. This was the third playoff meeting between these two teams; the teams split their two previous series. Their most recent meeting was in the 1975 Preliminary round, where Pittsburgh defeated St. Louis in two-game sweep. These teams split this year's four-game regular season series.

In game one of the series, Pittsburgh struck quickly thanks to a Greg Malone goal at 0:15 of the first period. However, the Blues recovered by the end of the second period and took a 3–2 lead into the final period, which they held on to, winning the game 4–2. Game two proved to be a different story, as the Penguins exploded offensively and scored four times in the second period to erase a 1-0 first period deficit. The Blues and Penguins traded goals in the third period, giving Pittsburgh a 6–4 victory that tied the series at a game apiece. Game three went back and forth, with both teams trading goals all game long until Bernie Federko scored his second goal of the game with 4:06 left to play in the third period. The Blues won the game 5-4 and retook home ice advantage in the best-of-five series. The Penguins avoided elimination in game four, as Randy Carlyle and Mike Bullard each scored three points in the game, helping the Penguins to a 6–3 win. Game five was another tight contest and for the first time in the series overtime was required, with the score tied at 3 after regulation time. The game and series ended on Mike Crombeen's second goal of the series, scored at 5:16 of the second overtime period, giving St. Louis a 4–3 win and a 3–2 series victory.

April 8	Pittsburgh Penguins	2–4	St. Louis Blues	Checkerdome	Recap
Greg Malone (1) – 00:15		First period	04:48 – pp – Mike Zuke (1); 15:58 – Tony Currie (1)
Rod Schutt (1) – 13:21		Second period	14:44 – Jorgen Pettersson (1)
No scoring		Third period	19:59 – en – Mike Crombeen (1)
Greg Millen 44 saves / 47 shots		Goalie stats	Mike Liut 24 saves / 26 shots

April 9	Pittsburgh Penguins	6–4	St. Louis Blues	Checkerdome	Recap
No scoring		First period	02:35 – pp – Joe Micheletti (1)
Randy Carlyle (1) – 02:03; Gregg Sheppard (1) – 04:58; Mario Faubert (1) – pp – 06:59; George Ferguson (1) – 11:13		Second period	03:11 – Tony Currie (2)
Rod Schutt (2) – 00:35; Randy Carlyle (2) – 03:06		Third period	10:49 – Blair Chapman (1); 16:04 – pp – Bernie Federko (1)
Greg Millen 19 saves / 23 shots		Goalie stats	Mike Liut 24 saves / 30 shots

April 11	St. Louis Blues	5–4	Pittsburgh Penguins	Pittsburgh Civic Arena	Recap
Brian Sutter (1) – pp – 11:51		First period	07:04 – pp – Rod Schutt (3)
Ralph Klassen (1) – 06:36; Wayne Babych (1) – 09:58; Bernie Federko (2) – pp – 14:38		Second period	08:57 – Mike Bullard (1); 10:31 – Mark Johnson (1)
Bernie Federko (3) – 15:54		Third period	05:08 – pp – Gregg Sheppard (2)
Mike Liut 27 saves / 31 shots		Goalie stats	Greg Millen 27 saves / 32 shots

April 12	St. Louis Blues	3–6	Pittsburgh Penguins	Pittsburgh Civic Arena	Recap
Ralph Klassen (2) – 05:53; Mike Zuke (2) – pp – 07:10		First period	14:52 – pp – Mike Bullard (2)
Mike Zuke (3) – pp – 13:55		Second period	07:45 – pp – Mark Johnson (2); 11:49 – sh – Randy Carlyle (3)
No scoring		Third period	00:44 – Mike Bullard (3); 09:21 – Randy Carlyle (4); 14:02 – Pat Price (1)
Mike Liut 28 saves / 34 shots		Goalie stats	Greg Millen 21 saves / 24 shots

April 14	Pittsburgh Penguins	3–4	2OT	St. Louis Blues	Checkerdome	Recap
Paul Gardner (1) – pp – 07:48		First period		No scoring
George Ferguson (2) – 15:06		Second period		11:17 – Brian Sutter (2); 16:06 – pp – Bernie Federko (4)
Greg Malone (2) – 10:36		Third period		03:34 – Rick Lapointe (1)
No scoring		Second overtime period		05:16 – Mike Crombeen (2)
Greg Millen 48 saves / 52 shots		Goalie stats		Mike Liut 48 saves / 51 shots

St. Louis won series 3–2

=== (3) Montreal Canadiens vs. (14) Edmonton Oilers ===
The Montreal Canadiens entered the playoffs as the Wales Conference and Norris Division champions, earning 103 points. The Edmonton Oilers earned 74 points during the regular season and finished fourteenth overall, losing the tiebreaker with the New York Rangers in wins (30 to 29). This was the first and only playoff meeting between these two teams. These teams split this year's four-game regular season series.

The Oilers recorded the first playoff series victory by any of the four teams that joined the NHL in the 1979. It was also the first-ever sweep by the Oilers, including their history as a World Hockey Association franchise. The Oilers gained a 6–3 victory in game one, in large part due to Wayne Gretzky's five-assist night. At the time this was a new playoff record for assists by a single player in one game. Edmonton went on to win game two, with Risto Siltanen's power play goal at 4:43 of the second period giving the Oilers a 2–1 lead, Edmonton eventually winning the game by a score of 3–1. Edmonton completed the sweep of the heavily favoured Canadiens in game three, defeating Montreal 6–2. Gretzky led all scorers in the three-game series, finishing with 11 points (3G, 8A).

April 8	Edmonton Oilers	6–3	Montreal Canadiens	Forum de Montréal	Recap
Glenn Anderson (1) – 06:41; Jari Kurri (1) – 11:42; Jari Kurri (2) – 17:36		First period	11:15 – Steve Shutt (1)
No scoring		Second period	No scoring
Brett Callighen (1) – 01:14; Paul Coffey (1) – 13:38; Brett Callighen (2) – en – 19:21		Third period	07:39 – pp – Doug Risebrough (1); 16:55 – Rejean Houle (1)
Andy Moog 28 saves / 31 shots		Goalie stats	Richard Sevigny 22 saves / 27 shots

April 9	Edmonton Oilers	3–1	Montreal Canadiens	Forum de Montréal	Recap
Paul Coffey (2) – 05:24		First period	No scoring
Risto Siltanen (1) – pp – 04:43		Second period	00:32 – pp – Gaston Gingras (1)
Jari Kurri (3) – 14:27		Third period	No scoring
Andy Moog 40 saves / 41 shots		Goalie stats	Richard Sevigny 26 saves / 29 shots

April 11	Montreal Canadiens	2–6	Edmonton Oilers	Northlands Coliseum	Recap
No scoring		First period	06:09 – Matti Hagman (1); 11:54 – Paul Coffey (3)
Brian Engblom (1) – 08:49; Steve Shutt (2) – 15:33		Second period	08:15 – Wayne Gretzky (1); 18:56 – Wayne Gretzky (2)
No scoring		Third period	19:23 – en – Dave Lumley (1); 19:53 – Wayne Gretzky (3)
Richard Sevigny 23 saves / 28 shots		Goalie stats	Andy Moog 22 saves / 24 shots

Edmonton won series 3–0

=== (4) Los Angeles Kings vs. (13) New York Rangers ===
The Los Angeles Kings entered the playoffs as the fourth overall seed in the league with 99 points, winning the tiebreaker with the Buffalo Sabres in wins (43 to 39). The New York Rangers earned 74 points during the regular season and finished thirteenth overall, winning the tiebreaker with the Edmonton Oilers in wins (30 to 29). This was the second playoff meeting between these two teams, with the only previous meeting being the 1979 Preliminary round, where New York defeated Los Angeles in two-game sweep. The Kings won three of the four games in this year's regular season series.

The Rangers won game one in large part due to the impressive goaltending performance of Steve Baker, as he turned away 31 of the Kings' 32 shots. Game two was marked by a brawl at the end of the first period; six players were ejected from the game as result of this. The Kings won game two 5–4 on the strength of a Dean Hopkins goal at 17:16 of the third period. Game three was dominated by the Rangers, as eight different players would score in the game for New York, and the Rangers won 10–3 on home ice. Game four was tied 3–3 in the third period, until Tom Laidlaw's goal at 6:44 gave the Rangers a 4–3 lead. The Rangers added two more goals in the third, earning a series-clinching 6–3 victory. Ranger forwards Ron Duguay and Ulf Nilsson each scored a goal in every game of this series.

April 8	New York Rangers	3–1	Los Angeles Kings	The Forum	Recap
Anders Hedberg (1) – 09:04		First period	No scoring
Ulf Nilsson (1) – 01:25		Second period	No scoring
Ron Duguay (1) – en – 19:52		Third period	12:31 – Billy Harris (1)
Steve Baker 31 saves / 32 shots		Goalie stats	Mario Lessard 16 saves / 18 shots

April 9	New York Rangers	4–5	Los Angeles Kings	The Forum	Recap
Ed Hospodar (1) – 00:27		First period	08:22 – pp – Larry Murphy (1); 08:48 – pp – Marcel Dionne (1)
Ron Duguay (2) – 16:44		Second period	15:04 – pp – Dave Taylor (1)
Anders Hedberg (2) – pp – 07:01; Ulf Nilsson (2) – 11:17		Third period	02:34 – Billy Harris (2); 17:16 – Dean Hopkins (1)
Steve Baker 34 saves / 39 shots		Goalie stats	Mario Lessard 23 saves / 27 shots

April 11	Los Angeles Kings	3–10	New York Rangers	Madison Square Garden	Recap
Mark Hardy (1) – pp – 01:13; Dave Taylor (2) – 02:48		First period	01:51 – pp – Don Maloney (1); 08:28 – Barry Beck (1); 14:29 – Ron Greschner (1); 19:44 – Ed Johnstone (1)
No scoring		Second period	07:34 – Ron Duguay (3); 12:25 – Ed Johnstone (2); 13:40 – Dean Talafous (1); 16:44 – Ulf Nilsson (3)
Larry Murphy (2) – 18:59		Third period	02:51 – Mike Allison (1); 07:38 – pp – Ulf Nilsson (4)
Mario Lessard 22 saves / 30 shots Jim Rutherford 6 saves / 8 shots		Goalie stats	Steve Baker 16 saves / 18 shots Steve Weeks 7 saves / 8 shots

April 12	Los Angeles Kings	3–6	New York Rangers	Madison Square Garden	Recap
Greg Terrion (1) – pp – 01:47; Dan Bonar (1) – sh – 13:26		First period	00:46 – Ron Duguay (4); 05:53 – Lance Nethery (1)
Larry Murphy (3) – 14:30		Second period	08:22 – Ulf Nilsson (5)
No scoring		Third period	06:44 – Tom Laidlaw (1); 12:11 – Anders Hedberg (3); 15:08 – Ron Duguay (5)
Mario Lessard 42 saves / 48 shots		Goalie stats	Steve Baker 24 saves / 27 shots

New York won series 3–1

=== (5) Buffalo Sabres vs. (12) Vancouver Canucks ===
The Buffalo Sabres entered the playoffs as the Adams Division champions, earning 99 points, losing the tiebreaker with the Los Angeles Kings in wins (43 to 39). The Vancouver Canucks earned 76 points during the regular season and finished twelfth overall in the league. This was the second playoff meeting between these two teams, and was a rematch of last year's Preliminary Round, where Buffalo defeated Vancouver in four games. These teams split this year's four-game regular season series.

The Sabres swept Vancouver in three games, eliminating the Canucks in the preliminary round for the second consecutive season. Buffalo forced game one to overtime as Andre Savard scored the tying goal with just 8 seconds left in the third period. Rookie centre Alan Haworth scored the game-winning goal for Buffalo five minutes into overtime. The Sabres scored three times on the power play in game two, winning the game 5–2. Vancouver attempted to mount a comeback from a 4–1 deficit in the third period of game three before Buffalo's Tony McKegney scored his second goal of the game, giving the Sabres a 5–3 lead. Buffalo hung on to their 5–3 lead and clinched the series with a game three victory.

April 8	Vancouver Canucks	2–3	OT	Buffalo Sabres	Buffalo Memorial Auditorium	Recap
Darcy Rota (1) – pp – 12:31		First period		No Scoring
Curt Fraser (1) – 04:51		Second period		00:14 – Ric Seiling (1)
No Scoring		Third period		19:52 – Andre Savard (1)
No Scoring		First overtime period		05:00 – Alan Haworth (1)
Richard Brodeur 24 saves / 27 shots		Goalie stats		Don Edwards 17 saves / 19 shots

April 9	Vancouver Canucks	2–5	Buffalo Sabres	Buffalo Memorial Auditorium	Recap
Jerry Butler (1) – 07:40		First period	05:02 – pp – Alan Haworth (2); 09:09 – Andre Savard (2); 19:41 – pp – Danny Gare (1)
No scoring		Second period	4:05 – Andre Savard (3); 15:52 – pp – Lindy Ruff (1)
Stan Smyl (1) – 01:59		Third period	No Scoring
Richard Brodeur 32 saves / 37 shots		Goalie stats	Don Edwards 20 saves / 22 shots

April 11	Buffalo Sabres	5–3	Vancouver Canucks	Pacific Coliseum	Recap
Danny Gare (2) – 11:10; Tony McKegney (1) – 14:37; Danny Gare (3) – pp – 17:12		First period	13:57 – Darcy Rota (2)
Lindy Ruff (2) – 10:25		Second period	No Scoring
Tony McKegney (2) – 15:42		Third period	01:13 – Thomas Gradin (1); 13:08 – Ivan Boldirev (1)
Don Edwards 23 saves / 26 shots		Goalie stats	Richard Brodeur 19 saves / 24 shots

Buffalo won series 3–0

=== (6) Philadelphia Flyers vs. (11) Quebec Nordiques ===
The Philadelphia Flyers entered the playoffs as the sixth seed in the league with 97 points. The Quebec Nordiques earned 78 points during the regular season and finished eleventh overall, losing the tiebreaker with the Chicago Black Hawks in wins (31 to 30). This was the first playoff meeting between these two teams. Quebec won this year's four-game regular season series earning five of eight points. This series also marked the first appearance of a team representing Quebec City in the Stanley Cup playoffs in 68 years. The most recent team to represent Quebec City prior to this was the Quebec Bulldogs who won the Stanley Cup in 1913, in the Bulldogs' final playoff appearance.

The home team won all games of this series. Bill Barber and Ken Linseman scored five points each in the first two games of the series. The Flyers won both games in Philadelphia, taking a 2–0 series lead. Game three was a battle of goaltenders, as the game remained scoreless until 9:48 of the third period, when Michel Goulet scored the eventual game-winning goal; Quebec won game three 2–0. Philadelphia took a 3–1 lead into the third period in game four, however the Nordiques made a comeback, tying the game in the third period with two goals in the last five minutes. Quebec completed the comeback 37 seconds into overtime as Dale Hunter scored the game-winning goal. Ken Linseman's three points in the third period of Game 5 helped ensure a Philadelphia series-clinching win, 5–2.

April 8	Quebec Nordiques	4–6	Philadelphia Flyers	Spectrum	Recap
Anton Stastny (1) – 14:08		First period	06:45 – Bill Barber (1); 09:09 – Brian Propp (1); 16:00 – Brian Propp (2)
Michel Goulet (1) – 01:28; Dale Hunter (1) – 04:34		Second period	No scoring
Anton Stastny (2) – pp – 17:55		Third period	01:41 – Paul Holmgren (1); 09:59 – Al Hill (1); 19:19 – en – Bill Barber (2)
Dan Bouchard 39 saves / 44 shots		Goalie stats	Rick St. Croix 16 saves / 20 shots

April 9	Quebec Nordiques	5–8	Philadelphia Flyers	Spectrum	Recap
Peter Stastny (1) – pp – 16:50		First period	02:07 – Bill Barber (3); 14:56 – Mel Bridgman (1); 18:31 – pp – Bill Barber (4)
Anton Stastny (3) – 02:31; Jacques Richard (1) – pp – 19:29		Second period	05:55 – sh – Bill Barber (5); 09:47 – Tom Gorence (1)
Dale Hunter (2) – 10:36; Marc Tardif (1) – 13:25		Third period	03:25 – Ken Linseman (1); 15:21 – Mel Bridgman (2); 18:46 – sh-en – Bobby Clarke (1)
Dan Bouchard 16 saves / 22 shots Michel Plasse 7 saves / 8 shots		Goalie stats	Pete Peeters 20 saves / 25 shots

April 11	Philadelphia Flyers	0–2	Quebec Nordiques	Colisée de Québec	Recap
No scoring		First period	No scoring
No scoring		Second period	No scoring
No scoring		Third period	09:48 – Michel Goulet (2); 17:26 – Peter Stastny (2)
Rick St. Croix 29 saves / 31 shots		Goalie stats	Dan Bouchard 32 saves / 32 shots

April 12	Philadelphia Flyers	3–4	OT	Quebec Nordiques	Colisée de Québec	Recap
Terry Murray (1) – 00:07; Behn Wilson (1) – 07:39; Tom Gorence (2) – 13:34		First period		06:13 – pp – Robbie Ftorek (1)
No scoring		Second period		No scoring
No scoring		Third period		15:35 – Dale Hunter (3); 17:08 – Jacques Richard (2)
No scoring		First overtime period		00:37 – Dale Hunter (4)
Rick St. Croix 19 saves / 23 shots		Goalie stats		Dan Bouchard 19 saves / 22 shots

April 14	Quebec Nordiques	2–5	Philadelphia Flyers	Spectrum	Recap
Michel Goulet (3) – 18:04		First period	17:16 – pp – Rick MacLeish (1)
No scoring		Second period	10:05 – Al Hill (2)
Anton Stastny (4) – pp – 06:16		Third period	00:18 – Ken Linseman (2); 02:48 – Paul Holmgren (2); 05:07 – Brian Propp (3)
Dan Bouchard 32 saves / 37 shots		Goalie stats	Pete Peeters 16 saves / 18 shots

Philadelphia won series 3–2

=== (7) Calgary Flames vs. (10) Chicago Black Hawks ===
The Calgary Flames entered the playoffs as the seventh seed in the league with 92 points. The Chicago Black Hawks earned 78 points during the regular season and finished tenth overall, winning the tiebreaker with the Quebec Nordiques in wins (31 to 30). This was the first playoff meeting between these two teams. Chicago won this year's four-game regular season series earning five of eight points. This series also marked the first appearance of a team representing Calgary in the Stanley Cup playoffs in 56 years. The most recent team to represent Calgary prior to this was the Calgary Tigers who lost the WCHL Final in 1925.

The Flames recorded their first sweep and first playoff series victory in franchise history. In game one, Calgary's Kent Nilsson recorded a point on every Calgary goal, helping the Flames to a 4–3 win. Calgary scored three times in the third period of game two and won the game decisively by a score of 6–2. The Black Hawks heavily out-shot the Flames in game three; Rejean Lemelin made 61 saves for the Flames. Chicago tied the game on a Darryl Sutter goal with 43 seconds left in the third period. However the Black Hawks came up short in double overtime as Willi Plett scored the series-clinching goal for the Flames at 15:17.

April 8	Chicago Black Hawks	3–4	Calgary Flames	Stampede Corral	Recap
No scoring		First period	No scoring
Darryl Sutter (1) – 17:54; Al Secord (1) – 18:03		Second period	01:14 – Bob MacMillan (1); 19:29 – Phil Russell (1)
Darryl Sutter (2) – pp – 08:40		Third period	07:34 – Kent Nilsson (1); 08:20 – pp – Dan Labraaten (1)
Tony Esposito 29 saves / 33 shots		Goalie stats	Rejean Lemelin 22 saves / 25 shots

April 9	Chicago Black Hawks	2–6	Calgary Flames	Stampede Corral	Recap
No scoring		First period	08:38 – Bob MacMillan (2)
Al Secord (2) – 06:53		Second period	16:15 – Bob MacMillan (3); 17:12 – pp – Willi Plett (1)
Peter Marsh (1) – 03:57		Third period	04:47 – Kent Nilsson (2); 05:22 – Guy Chouinard (1); 08:37 – Bill Clement (1)
Tony Esposito 36 saves / 42 shots		Goalie stats	Rejean Lemelin 38 saves / 40 shots

April 11	Calgary Flames	5–4	2OT	Chicago Black Hawks	Chicago Stadium	Recap
Willi Plett (2) – pp – 03:19; Ken Houston (1) – 17:34		First period		02:55 – sh – Rick Paterson (1); 09:56 – Al Secord (3)
Bob MacMillan (4) – 10:32; Don Lever (1) – 11:20		Second period		No scoring
No scoring		Third period		17:12 – Al Secord (4); 19:17 – Darryl Sutter (3)
Willi Plett (3) – 15:17		Second overtime period		No scoring
Rejean Lemelin 61 saves / 65 shots		Goalie stats		Tony Esposito 43 saves / 48 shots

Calgary won series 3–0

=== (8) Boston Bruins vs. (9) Minnesota North Stars ===
The Boston Bruins entered the playoffs as the eighth seed in the league with 87 points, winning the tiebreaker with the Minnesota North Stars in wins (37 to 35). The North Stars earned 87 points during the regular season and finished ninth overall, losing the tiebreaker with the Bruins in wins (37 to 35). This was the first and to date only playoff meeting between these two teams. Boston won this year's four-game regular season series earning five of eight points.

The North Stars swept the Bruins in three games. Minnesota won game one in overtime due to Steve Payne's hat trick goal at 3:34. The North Stars' win in game one was the first-ever victory for the franchise in the Boston Garden (they went winless in their first 35 games in Boston over fourteen seasons). In game two, Boston's Brad Park and Minnesota's Dino Ciccarelli both scored four points in a high-scoring 9-6 Minnesota victory. The North Stars scored four times in the first period of game three and they did not relinquish the lead, eliminating the Bruins with a 6–3 win.

April 8	Minnesota North Stars	5–4	OT	Boston Bruins	Boston Garden	Recap
Steve Payne (1) – pp – 05:32; Dino Ciccarelli (1) – 19:28		First period		12:54 – Don Marcotte (1)
No scoring		Second period		02:29 – Dwight Foster (1); 07:20 – pp – Peter McNab (1)
Steve Payne (2) – 00:37; Jack Carlson (1) – 11:55		Third period		07:14 – Peter McNab (2)
Steve Payne (3) – 03:34		First overtime period		No scoring
Gilles Meloche 28 saves / 32 shots		Goalie stats		Rogie Vachon 35 saves / 40 shots

April 9	Minnesota North Stars	9–6	Boston Bruins	Boston Garden	Recap
Bobby Smith (1) – 01:15; Steve Payne (4) – pp – 07:00; Al MacAdam (1) – 09:32		First period	00:56 – pp – Brad Park (1); 19:29 – Terry O'Reilly (1)
Brad Maxwell (1) – pp – 02:49; Steve Payne (5) – 10:15; Al MacAdam (2) – 19:38		Second period	00:41 – Peter McNab (3)
Dino Ciccarelli (2) – pp – 02:47; Kevin Maxwell (2) – 03:17; Tim Young (1) – 14:25		Third period	00:29 – Don Marcotte (2); 07:07 – Keith Crowder (1); 08:05 – Keith Crowder (2)
Don Beaupre 34 saves / 40 shots		Goalie stats	Rogie Vachon 14 saves / 20 shots Marco Baron 9 saves / 12 shots

April 11	Boston Bruins	3–6	Minnesota North Stars	Met Center	Recap
Mike O'Connell (1) – sh – 19:47		First period	03:36 – Brad Palmer (1); 04:57 – Al MacAdam (3); 12:00 – pp – Dino Ciccarelli (3); 18:33 – Steve Payne (6)
No scoring		Second period	18:05 – sh – Greg Smith (1)
Bobby Lalonde (1) – sh – 11:10; Bobby Lalonde (2) – sh – 15:42		Third period	18:34 – en – Steve Payne (7)
Rogie Vachon 39 saves / 44 shots		Goalie stats	Gilles Meloche 36 saves / 39 shots

Minnesota won series 3–0

== Quarterfinals ==
=== (1) New York Islanders vs. (8) Edmonton Oilers ===
This was the first playoff meeting between these two teams. The Islanders won the season series earning six of eight points in the year's four-game regular season series.

The Islanders eliminated the Oilers in six games; the Islanders also scored a power play goal in every game of this series. The Islanders' special teams dominated game one, as New York scored three times on the power play and added a shorthanded goal in an 8-2 Islanders win. Denis Potvin's hat trick and five point night in game two led the Islanders to a 6–3 victory. Wayne Gretzky scored his second hat trick of the playoffs in game three as the Oilers won the game by a score of 5–2. The Islanders won game four in overtime as Ken Morrow scored at 5:41 to give New York a 5–4 win. When Edmonton won game five 4–3, the Oilers' victory marked the only time in the 1981 Stanley Cup playoffs that the Islanders lost a game on home ice. Bob Nystrom's third goal of the playoffs in game six became the eventual series-clinching goal for the Islanders as New York won the game 5–2.

April 16	Edmonton Oilers	2–8	New York Islanders	Nassau Coliseum	Recap
No scoring		First period	03:14 – Bob Nystrom (1); 19:15 – pp – Butch Goring (1)
Wayne Gretzky (4) – pp – 08:06		Second period	02:46 – John Tonelli (1); 03:33 – Hector Marini (2); 04:30 – pp – Denis Potvin (1); 14:17 – pp – Clark Gillies (3)
Matti Hagman (2) – 12:27		Third period	07:15 – Clark Gillies (4); 10:50 – sh – Denis Potvin (2)
Andy Moog 14 saves / 20 shots Gary Edwards 4 saves / 6 shots		Goalie stats	Billy Smith 26 saves / 28 shots

April 17	Edmonton Oilers	3–6	New York Islanders	Nassau Coliseum	Recap
Glenn Anderson (2) – pp – 06:11		First period	No scoring
Risto Siltanen (2) – pp – 06:05; Glenn Anderson (3) – 12:23		Second period	02:26 – pp – Denis Potvin (3); 04:47 – pp – Butch Goring (2); 09:44 – pp – Denis Potvin (4)
No scoring		Third period	03:47 – pp – Denis Potvin (5); 07:59 – Mike Bossy (5); 17:41 – sh-en – Bryan Trottier (7)
Andy Moog 23 saves / 28 shots		Goalie stats	Billy Smith 19 saves / 22 shots

April 19	New York Islanders	2–5	Edmonton Oilers	Northlands Coliseum	Recap
No scoring		First period	No scoring
Mike Bossy (6) – pp – 12:30		Second period	02:16 – sh – Wayne Gretzky (5); 16:44 – pp – Wayne Gretzky (6)
Clark Gillies (5) – 10:33		Third period	03:24 – Matti Hagman (3); 06:59 – Wayne Gretzky (7); 16:25 – Jari Kurri (4)
Billy Smith 22 saves / 26 shots Roland Melanson 7 saves / 8 shots		Goalie stats	Andy Moog 28 saves / 30 shots

April 20	New York Islanders	5–4	OT	Edmonton Oilers	Northlands Coliseum	Recap
Denis Potvin (6) – pp – 07:57; Bob Nystrom (2) – 16:11		First period		03:02 – pp – Paul Coffey (4); 05:19 – Jari Kurri (5)
Bryan Trottier (8) – pp – 08:59; John Tonelli (2) – 13:52		Second period		10:46 – Mark Messier (1)
No scoring		Third period		07:00 – pp – Brett Callighen (3)
Ken Morrow (1) – 05:41		First overtime period		No scoring
Roland Melanson 29 saves / 33 shots		Goalie stats		Andy Moog 33 saves / 38 shots

April 22	Edmonton Oilers	4–3	New York Islanders	Nassau Coliseum	Recap
Doug Hicks (1) – 06:00; Glenn Anderson (4) – pp – 18:51		First period	12:56 – pp – Bryan Trottier (9); 16:31 – Mike Bossy (7)
Brett Callighen (4) – 18:44		Second period	No scoring
Matti Hagman (4) – 15:19		Third period	18:25 – pp – Mike Bossy (8)
Andy Moog 29 saves / 32 shots		Goalie stats	Billy Smith 18 saves / 22 shots

April 24	New York Islanders	5–2	Edmonton Oilers	Northlands Coliseum	Recap
Hector Marini (3) – 04:54		First period	No scoring
Anders Kallur (1) – 13:12; Bob Nystrom (3) – 15:45		Second period	00:39 – pp – Glenn Anderson (5)
Duane Sutter (1) – 09:16; Mike McEwen (3) – pp – 12:38		Third period	05:31 – Mark Messier (2)
Billy Smith 21 saves / 23 shots		Goalie stats	Andy Moog 21 saves / 26 shots

New York won series 4–2

=== (2) St. Louis Blues vs. (7) New York Rangers ===
This was the first playoff series meeting between these two teams. St. Louis won the season series winning all four games of this year's regular season series.

The Rangers eliminated the Blues in six games. Bernie Federko's three point night in Game one led St. Louis to a 6–3 victory. The Rangers overcame a one-goal deficit in the third period of Game two by scoring three goals in a span of 2:46, winning the game by a score of 6–4 and evening the series at one game each. Anders Hedberg's go ahead goal in third period of Game two was just the second successful penalty shot in Stanley Cup playoff history. The Rangers dominated the second period of Game three scoring four goals on fifteen shots taking a three-goal lead into the third period. New York hung on to win the game 6–3. Steve Baker allowed just one goal on 34 shots in Game four leading the Rangers to a 4–1 victory and a commanding 3–1 series lead. With the Blues trailing 3–2 in the second period of Game five Jorgen Pettersson scored his third goal of the playoffs tying the game at 3; he then scored a power play goal in the third period giving the Blues a 4–3 victory. The Blues trailed in game six 4–0 before scoring three goals in 1:50, however they were never able to get on equal terms losing the game 7–4 and series 4–2.

April 16	New York Rangers	3–6	St. Louis Blues	Checkerdome	Recap
Lance Nethery (2) – 07:25		First period	11:15 – pp – Bernie Federko (5); 14:55 – Brian Sutter (3); 17:39 – Blair Chapman (2)
Lance Nethery (3) – 01:34		Second period	08:56 – Mike Crombeen (3); 16:42 – Bernie Federko (6); 19:42 – Mike Zuke (4)
Jere Gillis (1) – 05:39		Third period	No scoring
Steve Baker 22 saves / 28 shots		Goalie stats	Mike Liut 28 saves / 31 shots

April 17	New York Rangers	6–4	St. Louis Blues	Checkerdome	Recap
Barry Beck (2)– sh – 03:07		First period	01:22 – Jorgen Pettersson (2); 02:16 – Larry Patey (1); 18:06 – pp – Brian Sutter (4)
Dean Talafous (2) – 16:24		Second period	No scoring
Jere Gillis (2) – 07:30; Anders Hedberg (4) – ps – 08:29; Mike Allison (2) – 10:16; Ron Duguay (6) – 19:13		Third period	15:04 – Brian Sutter (5)
Steve Baker 25 saves / 29 shots		Goalie stats	Mike Liut 24 saves / 30 shots

April 19	St. Louis Blues	3–6	New York Rangers	Madison Square Garden	Recap
Wayne Babych (2) – pp – 02:47		First period	00:40 – Ron Greschner (2)
Bill Stewart (1) – 15:35		Second period	05:13 – pp – Ulf Nilsson (6); 06:41 – Barry Beck (3); 13:49 – pp – Mike Allison (3); 17:56 – Steve Vickers (1)
Tony Currie (3) – 00:24		Third period	02:23 – Lance Nethery (4)
Mike Liut 25 saves / 31 shots		Goalie stats	Steve Baker 14 saves / 17 shots

April 20	St. Louis Blues	1–4	New York Rangers	Madison Square Garden	Recap
Tony Currie (4) – pp – 07:40		First period	06:14 – Anders Hedberg (4); 18:37 – Ron Duguay (7)
No scoring		Second period	09:01 – pp – Steve Vickers (2)
No scoring		Third period	03:24 – Steve Vickers (3)
Mike Liut 24 saves / 28 shots		Goalie stats	Steve Baker 33 saves / 34 shots

April 22	New York Rangers	3–4	St. Louis Blues	Checkerdome	Recap
Ron Greschner (3) – 06:35; Ulf Nilsson (7) – pp – 10:06		First period	14:17 – pp – Brian Sutter (6)
Carol Vadnais (1) – 02:54		Second period	08:25 – Larry Patey (2); 14:55 – Jorgen Pettersson (3)
No scoring		Third period	06:09 – pp – Jorgen Pettersson (4)
Steve Baker 26 saves / 30 shots		Goalie stats	Mike Liut 34 saves / 37 shots

April 24	St. Louis Blues	4–7	New York Rangers	Madison Square Garden	Recap
No scoring		First period	03:27 – Steve Vickers (4); 05:49 – Anders Hedberg (6); 16:10 – sh – Ron Duguay (8)
Bernie Federko (7) – 02:16; Rick Lapointe (2) – 03:14; Bernie Federko (8) – 04:06		Second period	01:59 – Barry Beck (4); 17:03 – Lance Nethery (5)
Ed Kea (1) – 06:00		Third period	04:31 – Peter Wallin (1); 14:54 – Ulf Nilsson (8)
Mike Liut 13 saves / 20 shots		Goalie stats	Steve Baker 12 saves / 16 shots

New York won series 4–2

=== (3) Buffalo Sabres vs. (6) Minnesota North Stars ===
This was the second playoff meeting between these two teams, with Buffalo sweeping the only previous meeting in two games in the 1977 Stanley Cup preliminary round. Minnesota won the season series earning five of eight points in this year's four-game regular season series.

The North Stars defeated the Sabres in five games. Game one required overtime as the teams exchanged the lead throughout regulation time. Minnesota winger Steve Payne ended the game just 22 seconds into the first overtime period; to date this is still the quickest playoff overtime goal in North Stars/Stars franchise history and tied for the tenth fastest in league history. Steve Christoff and Dino Ciccarelli each scored twice for the North Stars in game two as Minnesota took a 2–0 series lead with a 5–2 victory. Buffalo goaltender Don Edwards made 43 saves in a losing effort in game three as the Sabres lost by a score of 6–4. Minnesota forced overtime in game four after trailing by three goals in the second period; the Sabres extended the series with an overtime win as Craig Ramsay scored at 16:32 of the first overtime period. Don Beaupre made 36 saves for Minnesota in game five as they advanced to the Stanley Cup Semifinals for the second consecutive season.

April 16	Minnesota North Stars	4–3	OT	Buffalo Sabres	Buffalo Memorial Auditorium	Recap
Brad Palmer (2) – sh – 09:40		First period		No scoring
No scoring		Second period		05:13 – pp – Andre Savard (4); 11:28 – Lindy Ruff (3)
Al MacAdam (4) – 01:46; Steve Payne (8) – 11:58		Third period		14:46 – Craig Ramsay (1)
Steve Payne (9) – 00:22		First overtime period		No scoring
Gilles Meloche 29 saves / 32 shots		Goalie stats		Don Edwards 22 saves / 26 shots

April 17	Minnesota North Stars	5–2	Buffalo Sabres	Buffalo Memorial Auditorium	Recap
No scoring		First period	09:17 – pp – Tony McKegney (3)
Steve Christoff (1) – pp – 14:47; Steve Christoff (2) – 18:17		Second period	No scoring
Dino Ciccarelli (4) – 04:01; Bobby Smith (2) – 09:59; Dino Ciccarelli (5) – en – 19:35		Third period	02:01 – Tony McKegney (4)
Gilles Meloche 25 saves / 27 shots		Goalie stats	Don Edwards 21 saves / 25 shots

April 19	Buffalo Sabres	4–6	Minnesota North Stars	Met Center	Recap
Alan Haworth (3) – pp – 18:10		First period	06:41 – pp – Dino Ciccarelli (6); 12:17 – Brad Palmer (3); 13:14 – Al MacAdam (5)
Gilbert Perreault (1) – 11:13; Ric Seiling (2) – 19:40		Second period	No scoring
Derek Smith (1) – pp – 18:16		Third period	08:46 – Kevin Maxwell (2); 09:09 – Neal Broten (1); 19:22 – en – Tim Young (2)
Don Edwards 43 saves / 48 shots		Goalie stats	Gilles Meloche 31 saves / 35 shots

April 20	Buffalo Sabres	5–4	OT	Minnesota North Stars	Met Center	Recap
Jean-Francois Sauve (1) – 09:39		First period		No scoring
Gilbert Perreault (2) – 02:04; Alan Haworth (4) – pp – 06:35		Second period		07:29 – Dino Ciccarelli (7); 10:16 – pp – Steve Christoff (3); 19:46 – pp – Steve Payne (10)
John Van Boxmeer (1) – 04:58		Third period		18:54 – Bobby Smith (3)
Craig Ramsay (2) – 16:32		First overtime period		No scoring
Don Edwards 46 saves / 50 shots		Goalie stats		Gilles Meloche 33 saves / 38 shots

April 22	Minnesota North Stars	4–3	Buffalo Sabres	Buffalo Memorial Auditorium	Recap
Ken Solheim (1) – 15:36		First period	05:06 – pp – Jean-Francois Sauve (2)
Kent-Erik Andersson (1) – 15:14; Brad Maxwell (2) – 18:01		Second period	No scoring
Al MacAdam (6) – 00:18		Third period	02:03 – Bob Hess (1); 18:18 – Tony McKegney (5)
Don Beaupre 36 saves / 39 shots		Goalie stats	Don Edwards 29 saves / 33 shots

Minnesota won series 4–1

=== (4) Philadelphia Flyers vs. (5) Calgary Flames ===
This was the second and most recent playoff meeting between these two teams, with Philadelphia sweeping the Atlanta Flames in their only previous meeting in four-game sweep in the 1974 Stanley Cup Quarterfinals. The teams split this year's four-game regular season series.

The Flames defeated the Flyers in seven games. Philadelphia goaltender Rick St. Croix made 35 saves as the Flyers took game one 4–0. After exchanging goals in the first period of game two, the Flames scored three times in the second period and held on late to even the series with a 5–4 victory. Willi Plett gave Calgary the lead early in the third period of game three and Pat Riggin made 47 saves in the Flames 2–1 win. Calgary needed two goals in third period of game four from Randy Holt to secure their third straight one goal victory in the series. Philadelphia forced a sixth game in the series with a commanding 9–4 win in game five; Brian Propp recorded a natural hat trick in the first period for the Flyers. Forward Ken Linseman's second goal in game six for Philadelphia held up as the game-winner as the Flyers avoided elimination with a 3–2 triumph. The Flames struck three times on the power-play in game seven as they ended the series with a 4–1 victory. With the win Calgary became the first relocated team in league history to advance to the third round of the playoffs in their inaugural season in their new location (this feat was later surpassed by the Colorado Avalanche in 1996).

April 16	Calgary Flames	0–4	Philadelphia Flyers	Spectrum	Recap
No scoring		First period	03:30 – pp – Paul Holmgren (3); 08:41 – Bill Barber (6)
No scoring		Second period	10:44 – Paul Holmgren (4); 19:26 – Terry Murray (2)
No scoring		Third period	No scoring
Rejean Lemelin 24 saves / 28 shots		Goalie stats	Rick St. Croix 35 saves / 35 shots

April 17	Calgary Flames	5–4	Philadelphia Flyers	Spectrum	Recap
Paul Reinhart (1) – pp – 12:34; Kent Nilsson (3) – 18:02		First period	05:49 – pp – Bill Barber (7); 16:16 – pp – Rick MacLeish (2)
Ken Houston (2) – pp – 05:58; Willi Plett (4) – 10:45; Jamie Hislop (1) – pp – 17:08		Second period	No scoring
No scoring		Third period	13:37 – pp – Behn Wilson (2); 17:08 – Tom Gorence (3)
Pat Riggin 42 saves / 46 shots		Goalie stats	Pete Peeters 17 saves / 22 shots

April 19	Philadelphia Flyers	1–2	Calgary Flames	Stampede Corral	Recap
Rick MacLeish (3) – pp – 09:54		First period	05:25 – Don Lever (2)
No scoring		Second period	No scoring
No scoring		Third period	02:26 – Willi Plett (5)
Rick St. Croix 23 saves / 25 shots		Goalie stats	Pat Riggin 47 saves / 48 shots

April 20	Philadelphia Flyers	4–5	Calgary Flames	Stampede Corral	Recap
Paul Holmgren (5) – pp – 19:43		First period	04:38 – Jamie Hislop (2)
No scoring		Second period	06:38 – Jim Peplinski (1); 07:10 – Don Lever (3)
Rick MacLeish (4) – 07:21; Bobby Clarke (2) – 09:23; Bill Barber (8) – 15:55		Third period	10:00 – Randy Holt (1); 14:44 – Randy Holt (2)
Rick St. Croix 23 saves / 28 shots		Goalie stats	Pat Riggin 28 saves / 32 shots

April 22	Calgary Flames	4–9	Philadelphia Flyers	Spectrum	Recap
Phil Russell (2) – 14:56		First period	01:08 – pp – Rick MacLeish (5); 04:39 – Brian Propp (4); 09:06 – Brian Propp (5); 12:48 – Brian Propp (6); 15:57 – Bill Barber (9)
Ken Houston (3) – pp – 08:31		Second period	10:16 – Glen Cochrane (1); 18:21 – pp – Tim Kerr (1)
Bobby Gould (1) – 01:41; Bob MacMillan (5) – pp – 16:31		Third period	03:38 – Ron Flockhart (1); 11:04 – pp – Bill Barber (10)
Pat Riggin 26 saves / 35 shots		Goalie stats	Rick St. Croix 23 saves / 27 shots

April 24	Philadelphia Flyers	3–2	Calgary Flames	Stampede Corral	Recap
No scoring		First period	No scoring
Ken Linseman (3) – 03:35; Bobby Clarke (3) – 03:51; Ken Linseman (4) – 18:34		Second period	16:13 – Guy Chouinard (2)
No scoring		Third period	13:49 – pp – Ken Houston (4)
Rick St. Croix 34 saves / 36 shots		Goalie stats	Rejean Lemelin 24 saves / 27 shots

April 26	Calgary Flames	4–1	Philadelphia Flyers	Spectrum	Recap
Willi Plett (6) – pp – 03:03; Ken Houston (5) – pp – 08:33		First period	No scoring
Kevin LaVallee (1) – pp – 13:00		Second period	13:49 – Bill Barber (11)
Bob MacMillan (6) – 06:09		Third period	No scoring
Pat Riggin 31 saves / 32 shots		Goalie stats	Rick St. Croix 21 saves / 25 shots

Calgary won series 4–3

== Semifinals ==
=== (1) New York Islanders vs. (4) New York Rangers ===
This was the third playoff meeting between these two rivals. Both teams have split their previous two meetings. They last met in the 1979 Stanley Cup Semifinals where the Rangers won in six games. The teams split this year's four-game regular season series.

April 28	New York Rangers	2–5	New York Islanders	Nassau Coliseum	Recap
Anders Hedberg (7) – pp – 12:10		First period	No scoring
Ed Hospodar (2) – 03:34		Second period	00:16 – Duane Sutter (2); 04:50 – pp – Mike McEwen (4); 06:47 – John Tonelli (3)
No scoring		Third period	05:45 – John Tonelli (4); 15:23 – Billy Carroll (2)
Steve Baker 25 saves / 30 shots		Goalie stats	Billy Smith 18 saves / 20 shots

April 30	New York Rangers	3–7	New York Islanders	Nassau Coliseum	Recap
Doug Sulliman (1) – 01:57; Dean Talafous (3) – 08:18; Anders Hedberg (8) – pp – 16:39		First period	00:48 – Wayne Merrick (2)
No scoring		Second period	08:11 – sh – Butch Goring (3); 10:21 – pp – Mike Bossy (9); 12:44 – Butch Goring (4)
No scoring		Third period	12:59 – pp – Clark Gillies (6); 14:27 – sh – Anders Kallur (2); 17:47 – Mike Bossy (10)
Steve Baker 22 saves / 29 shots		Goalie stats	Billy Smith 17 saves / 20 shots

May 2	New York Islanders	5–1	New York Rangers	Madison Square Garden	Recap
Mike Bossy (11) – pp – 14:36; Bob Bourne (3) – 18:33		First period	No scoring
Ken Morrow (2) – 15:31; Bob Nystrom (4) – 19:55		Second period	No scoring
Wayne Merrick (3) – 14:54		Third period	05:13 – Peter Wallin (2)
Billy Smith 24 saves / 25 shots		Goalie stats	Steve Baker 26 saves / 31 shots

May 5	New York Islanders	5–2	New York Rangers	Madison Square Garden	Recap
John Tonelli (5) – 01:02; Mike Bossy (12) – pp 13:46; Mike Bossy (13) – pp 17:11		First period	No scoring
Butch Goring (5) – sh – 01:29		Second period	13:39 – pp – Ron Greschner (4); 17:22 – pp – Barry Beck (5)
Duane Sutter (3) – 10:49		Third period	No scoring
Billy Smith 27 saves / 29 shots		Goalie stats	Steve Baker 18 saves / 23 shots

New York Islanders won series 4–0

=== (2) Calgary Flames vs. (3) Minnesota North Stars ===
This was the first playoff meeting between these two teams. The teams split this year's four-game regular season series.

April 28	Minnesota North Stars	4–1	Calgary Flames	Stampede Corral	Recap
Craig Hartsburg (1) – pp – 15:00		First period	No scoring
Tim Young (3) – 04:38; Gordie Roberts (1) – sh – 19:48		Second period	15:12 – Jim Peplinski (2)
Al MacAdam (7) – sh – 00:12		Third period	No scoring
Gilles Meloche 35 saves / 36 shots		Goalie stats	Pat Riggin 40 saves / 44 shots

April 30	Minnesota North Stars	2–3	Calgary Flames	Stampede Corral	Recap
No scoring		First period	05:11 – Pekka Rautakallio (1); 08:35 – Guy Chouinard (3)
No scoring		Second period	No scoring
Curt Giles (1) – 04:24; Steve Christoff (4) – pp – 10:34		Third period	06:25 – Kevin LaVallee (2)
Gilles Meloche 25 saves / 28 shots		Goalie stats	Pat Riggin 31 saves / 33 shots

May 3	Calgary Flames	4–6	Minnesota North Stars	Met Center	Recap
Ken Houston (6) – 03:23		First period	06:43 – Bobby Smith (4); 16:08 – Brad Maxwell (3)
Bob Murdoch (1) – 02:00; Bobby Gould (2) – 06:54; Bill Clement (2) – 17:40		Second period	09:00 – pp – Steve Payne (11); 12:37 – pp – Brad Palmer (4)
No scoring		Third period	04:24 – Steve Christoff (5); 19:37 – en – Bobby Smith (5)
Pat Riggin 25 saves / 30 shots		Goalie stats	Gilles Meloche 30 saves / 34 shots

May 5	Calgary Flames	4–7	Minnesota North Stars	Met Center	Recap
Pekka Rautakallio (2) – pp – 09:26		First period	03:01 – pp – Dino Ciccarelli (8); 13:18 – pp – Steve Christoff (6); 16:32 – Bobby Smith (6)
Jamie Hislop (3) – 01:31		Second period	02:42 – Dino Ciccarelli (9); 03:56 – Dino Ciccarelli (10); 10:51 – Brad Palmer (5)
Bobby Gould (3) – 10:22; Mike Dwyer (1) – 10:37		Third period	08:44 – sh – Kevin Maxwell (3)
Rejean Lemelin 21 saves / 27 shots Pat Riggin 16 saves / 17 shots		Goalie stats	Don Beaupre 29 saves / 33 shots

May 7	Minnesota North Stars	1–3	Calgary Flames	Stampede Corral	Recap
No scoring		First period	18:54 – pp – Bob MacMillan (7)
No scoring		Second period	00:55 – Bob MacMillan (8)
Craig Hartsburg (2) – pp – 16:02		Third period	03:54 – pp – Willi Plett (7)
Gilles Meloche 24 saves / 27 shots		Goalie stats	Pat Riggin 33 saves / 34 shots

May 9	Calgary Flames	3–5	Minnesota North Stars	Met Center	Recap
No scoring		First period	13:52 – pp – Al MacAdam (8)
Willi Plett (8) – pp – 02:57		Second period	11:36 – Dino Ciccarelli (11)
Ken Houston (7) – pp – 15:07; Don Lever (4) – 19:20		Third period	05:59 – pp – Steve Payne (12); 14:09 – sh – Brad Palmer (6); 18:40 – Brad Palmer (7)
Pat Riggin 30 saves / 35 shots		Goalie stats	Gilles Meloche 23 saves / 26 shots

Minnesota won series 4–2

== Stanley Cup Finals ==
This was the first playoff meeting between these two teams. The Islanders made their second consecutive and second overall appearance in the Finals; they defeated the Philadelphia Flyers the previous year in six games. Minnesota made their first Finals appearance in their fourteenth season after entering the league in 1967. The Islanders won this year's four-game regular season series earning six of eight points.

May 12	Minnesota North Stars	3–6	New York Islanders	Nassau Coliseum	Recap
No scoring		First period	Anders Kallur (3) – 02:54; Bryan Trottier (10) – sh – 14:38; Anders Kallur (4) – sh – 15:25
13:04 – Kent-Erik Andersson (2)		Second period	Billy Carroll (3) – 09:58
03:08 – pp – Steve Payne (13); 15:14 – Dino Ciccarelli (12)		Third period	Wayne Merrick (4) – 00:58; Wayne Merrick (5) – 13:15
Gilles Meloche 17 saves / 23 shots		Goalie stats	Billy Smith 23 saves / 26 shots

May 14	Minnesota North Stars	3–6	New York Islanders	Nassau Coliseum	Recap
03:38 – pp – Dino Ciccarelli (13)		First period	Mike Bossy (14) – pp – 04:33; Bob Nystrom (5) – 14:39; Denis Potvin (7) – 17:48
09:15 – Brad Palmer (8)		Second period	No scoring
00:30 – Steve Payne (14)		Third period	Denis Potvin (8) – pp – 08:00; Ken Morrow (3) – 11:57; Mike Bossy (15) – 16:22
Don Beaupre 32 saves / 38 shots		Goalie stats	Billy Smith 25 saves / 28 shots

May 17	New York Islanders	7–5	Minnesota North Stars	Met Center	Recap
14:47 – Mike Bossy (16)		First period	Steve Christoff (7) – pp – 03:25; Steve Payne (15) – 14:09; Bobby Smith (7) – pp – 16:30
04:10 – Bob Nystrom (6); 07:16 – pp – Butch Goring (6); 11:51 – Butch Goring (7)		Second period	No scoring
02:05 – Mike Bossy (17); 06:34 – Butch Goring (8); 19:16 – en – Bryan Trottier (11)		Third period	Steve Payne (16) – 01:11; Dino Ciccarelli (14) – 13:35
Billy Smith 23 saves / 28 shots		Goalie stats	Gilles Meloche 22 saves / 28 shots

May 19	New York Islanders	2–4	Minnesota North Stars	Met Center	Recap
03:47 – Gord Lane (1)		First period	Craig Hartsburg (3) – pp – 11:34
07:37 – pp – Mike McEwen (5)		Second period	Al MacAdam (9) – 05:15
No scoring		Third period	Steve Payne (17) – 12:26; Bobby Smith (8) – pp – 18:12
Billy Smith 30 saves / 34 shots		Goalie stats	Don Beaupre 33 saves / 35 shots

May 21	Minnesota North Stars	1–5	New York Islanders	Nassau Coliseum	Recap
16:06 – Steve Christoff (8)		First period	Butch Goring (9) – pp – 05:12; Wayne Merrick (6) – 05:37; Butch Goring (10) – 10:03
No scoring		Second period	Bob Bourne (4) – 19:21
No scoring		Third period	Mike McEwen (6) – 17:06
Don Beaupre 28 saves / 33 shots		Goalie stats	Billy Smith 24 saves / 25 shots

New York won series 4–1

== Player statistics ==
=== Skaters ===
These are the top ten skaters based on points.

Player	Team	GP	G	A	Pts	+/–	PIM
Mike Bossy	New York Islanders	18	17	18	35	+14	4
Steve Payne	Minnesota North Stars	19	17	12	29	+2	6
Bryan Trottier	New York Islanders	18	11	18	29	+18	34
Denis Potvin	New York Islanders	18	8	17	25	+18	16
Bobby Smith	Minnesota North Stars	19	8	17	25	+1	13
Dino Ciccarelli	Minnesota North Stars	19	14	7	21	-2	25
Wayne Gretzky	Edmonton Oilers	9	7	14	21	+10	4
Butch Goring	New York Islanders	18	10	10	20	+6	6
Ken Linseman	Philadelphia Flyers	12	4	16	20	+10	67
Al MacAdam	Minnesota North Stars	19	9	10	19	+3	4

=== Goaltenders ===
This is a combined table of the top five goaltenders based on goals against average and the top five goaltenders based on save percentage, with at least 420 minutes. The table is sorted by GAA, and the criteria for inclusion are bolded.

Player	Team	GP	W	L	SA	GA	GAA	SV%	SO	TOI
Billy Smith	New York Islanders	17	14	3	435	42	**2.54**	**.903**	0	991:22
Rick St. Croix	Philadelphia Flyers	9	4	5	250	27	**3.01**	**.892**	1	537:26
Don Edwards	Buffalo Sabres	8	4	4	249	28	**3.38**	**.888**	0	497:13
Gilles Meloche	Minnesota North Stars	13	8	5	405	47	**3.53**	**.884**	0	798:55
Pat Riggin	Calgary Flames	11	6	4	386	37	**3.54**	**.904**	0	627:15

== See also ==
- 1980–81 NHL season
- List of NHL seasons
- List of Stanley Cup champions

Preceded by 1980 Stanley Cup playoffs	Stanley Cup playoffs	Succeeded by 1982 Stanley Cup playoffs
