= Pat Riggin =

Canadian ice hockey player (born 1959)

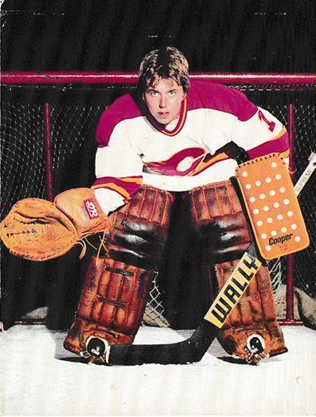
- Riggin with the Calgary Flames in 1980
- Born: May 26, 1959 (age 67) Kincardine, Ontario, Canada
- Height: 5 ft 9 in (175 cm)
- Weight: 170 lb (77 kg; 12 st 2 lb)
- Position: Goaltender
- Caught: Right
- Played for: Birmingham Bulls; Atlanta Flames; Calgary Flames; Washington Capitals; Boston Bruins; Pittsburgh Penguins
- NHL draft: 33rd overall, 1979; Atlanta Flames
- Playing career: 1978–1988

Patrick Michael Riggin (born May 26, 1959) is a Canadian former professional ice hockey goaltender.

== Playing career ==
=== Birmingham Bulls ===
Riggin began his professional career while still a teenager with the Birmingham Bulls of the World Hockey Association. Riggin beat out veteran Ernie Wakely for the Bulls starting job, posting a 16-20-5 record.

=== Atlanta/Calgary Flames ===
Riggin was drafted 33rd overall by the Atlanta Flames in the 1979 NHL entry draft.

Riggin spent his rookie season backing up Dan Bouchard, and became the Flames' starter after Bouchard was dealt to the Quebec Nordiques in January 1981.

Riggin made his playoff debut in the 1981 Stanley Cup playoffs, stopping 42 shots in the Flames' Game 2 victory over the Philadelphia Flyers.

Riggin and Ken Houston were traded to the Washington Capitals on June 9, 1982, in exchange for Howard Walker, George White, a 1982 sixth-round pick, a 1983 third-round pick and a 1984 second-round pick.

=== Washington Capitals ===
With Washington, Riggin would platoon in the Capitals goal splitting duties with Al Jensen and both netminders excelled. They had a history before being teammates with both of them duelling during their Junior days to be the top goaltender in the OHA. Riggin was a First-Team All-Star with the London Knights in 1976-77 and Jensen a Second Team All-Star for Hamilton. The following year, the roles were reversed with Jensen taking top honours and Riggin on the Second Team.

Riggin suited up for 38 games in 1982-83 and posted 21 wins and a 2.66 goals against average in 41 games during the 1983–84 season. Riggin and Jensen shared the William M. Jennings Trophy as the Capitals' goaltending duo allowed the fewest goals in the NHL that season. Riggin earned NHL Second All-Star Team honors that season for his efforts.

Riggin played a career-high 57 games in the 1984-85 season, primarily in part to Jensen's knee injury. He placed among the league leaders for wins and goals against but fell short in the Stanley Cup playoffs. After being eliminated by the New York Islanders, Riggin joined Team Canada at the 1985 Ice Hockey World Championships, earning a silver medal.

Riggin sparked a minor controversy, as he cited his motivation for defeating the United States was primarily due to the influx of American talent establishing themselves on NHL rosters, which he felt was taking spots away from Canadian players. Riggin's remarks were controversial, primarily due to the fact he played for an American-based NHL franchise. Riggin addressed the controversy, citing he used poor choices of words in his interview.

Riggin got off to a slow start to the 1985-86 season, recording two wins in his first seven games with a .827 save percentage. He would later be traded to the Boston Bruins.

=== Boston Bruins ===
Riggin was traded to the Bruins in exchange for Pete Peeters. He was part of another platoon situation with Doug Keans. Riggin played 39 games and led the team in wins and goals against, but only played in Game 1 of the Bruins playoff series with the Montreal Canadiens. Riggin was benched in favor of Bill Ranford for the rest of the series, in which the Bruins would be eventually eliminated.

Ranford and Keans were established as the Bruins goaltending tandem the following season, leaving Riggin as the odd-man-out. Riggin got into ten games with the Bruins before being assigned to their American Hockey League affiliate, the Moncton Hawks.

=== Pittsburgh Penguins ===
Riggin was traded to the Pittsburgh Penguins on February 6, 1987, in exchange for Roberto Romano. Riggin was acquired by the Penguins to alleviate the workload of Gilles Meloche. Riggin made an immediate impact for his new club, posting an 8-6-3 record in 17 games following the trade.

Riggin struggled the following season, managing seven wins in 22 appearances. He was deemed expendable by the Penguins, following the emergence of young goaltender Frank Pietrangelo, and was assigned to the Muskegon Lumberjacks of the International Hockey League.

Riggin announced his retirement from hockey at the end of the season.

== Personal life ==
Riggin is the son of former Detroit Red Wings goaltender Dennis Riggin.

== Career statistics ==
=== Regular season and playoffs ===
| | | | Regular season | | | | | | | | | Playoffs |
| Season | Team | League | GP | W | L | T | MIN | GA | SO | GAA | SV% | GP | W | L | T | MIN | GA | SO | GAA | SV% |
|---|---|---|---|---|---|---|---|---|---|---|---|---|---|---|---|---|---|---|---|---|
| 1975–76 | London Knights | OMJHL | 29 | — | — | — | 1385 | 86 | 0 | 3.68 | — | 1 | 0 | 1 | 0 | 60 | 6 | 0 | 6.00 | — |
| 1976–77 | London Knights | OMJHL | 48 | — | — | — | 2809 | 138 | 2 | 2.95 | — | 20 | 10 | 8 | 2 | 1197 | 66 | 2 | 3.20 | — |
| 1976–77 | Ottawa 67's | M-Cup | — | — | — | — | — | — | — | — | — | 4 | 3 | 1 | — | 244 | 12 | 0 | 2.98 | — |
| 1977–78 | London Knights | OMJHL | 38 | — | — | — | 2266 | 140 | 0 | 3.65 | — | 9 | 6 | 2 | 1 | 536 | 27 | 0 | 3.03 | — |
| 1978–79 | Birmingham Bulls | WHA | 46 | 16 | 22 | 5 | 2511 | 158 | 1 | 3.78 | .880 | — | — | — | — | — | — | — | — | — |
| 1979–80 | Atlanta Flames | NHL | 25 | 11 | 9 | 2 | 1368 | 73 | 2 | 3.20 | .894 | — | — | — | — | — | — | — | — | — |
| 1979–80 | Birmingham Bulls | CHL | 12 | 8 | 2 | 2 | 746 | 32 | 0 | 2.57 | .920 | — | — | — | — | — | — | — | — | — |
| 1980–81 | Calgary Flames | NHL | 42 | 21 | 16 | 4 | 2411 | 154 | 0 | 3.83 | .883 | 11 | 6 | 4 | — | 629 | 37 | 0 | 3.53 | .904 |
| 1981–82 | Calgary Flames | NHL | 52 | 19 | 19 | 11 | 2934 | 207 | 2 | 4.23 | .871 | 3 | 0 | 3 | — | 194 | 10 | 0 | 3.09 | .899 |
| 1982–83 | Washington Capitals | NHL | 38 | 16 | 9 | 9 | 2161 | 121 | 0 | 3.36 | .881 | 3 | 0 | 1 | — | 101 | 8 | 0 | 4.75 | .862 |
| 1983–84 | Hershey Bears | AHL | 3 | 2 | 0 | 1 | 185 | 7 | 0 | 2.27 | .933 | — | — | — | — | — | — | — | — | — |
| 1983–84 | Washington Capitals | NHL | 41 | 21 | 14 | 2 | 2299 | 102 | 4 | 2.66 | .890 | 5 | 1 | 3 | — | 230 | 9 | 0 | 2.35 | .889 |
| 1984–85 | Washington Capitals | NHL | 57 | 28 | 20 | 7 | 3388 | 168 | 2 | 2.98 | .886 | 2 | 1 | 1 | — | 122 | 5 | 0 | 2.46 | .872 |
| 1985–86 | Washington Capitals | NHL | 7 | 2 | 3 | 1 | 369 | 23 | 0 | 3.74 | .827 | — | — | — | — | — | — | — | — | — |
| 1985–86 | Boston Bruins | NHL | 39 | 17 | 11 | 8 | 2272 | 127 | 1 | 3.35 | .869 | 1 | 0 | 1 | — | 60 | 3 | 0 | 3.00 | .870 |
| 1986–87 | Boston Bruins | NHL | 10 | 3 | 5 | 1 | 513 | 29 | 0 | 3.39 | .877 | — | — | — | — | — | — | — | — | — |
| 1986–87 | Moncton Golden Flames | AHL | 14 | 6 | 5 | 0 | 798 | 34 | 1 | 2.56 | .892 | — | — | — | — | — | — | — | — | — |
| 1986–87 | Pittsburgh Penguins | NHL | 17 | 8 | 6 | 3 | 988 | 55 | 0 | 3.34 | .882 | — | — | — | — | — | — | — | — | — |
| 1987–88 | Pittsburgh Penguins | NHL | 22 | 7 | 8 | 4 | 1169 | 76 | 0 | 3.90 | .869 | — | — | — | — | — | — | — | — | — |
| 1987–88 | Muskegon Lumberjacks | IHL | 18 | 13 | 2 | 0 | 956 | 43 | 0 | 2.70 | — | 2 | 1 | 1 | — | 110 | 12 | 0 | 6.55 | — |
| WHA totals | | | 46 | 16 | 22 | 5 | 2511 | 158 | 1 | 3.78 | .880 | — | — | — | — | — | — | — | — | — |
| NHL totals | | | 350 | 153 | 120 | 52 | 19,872 | 1,135 | 11 | 3.43 | .879 | 25 | 8 | 13 | — | 1,336 | 72 | 0 | 3.23 | .895 |

"Riggin's stats". The Goaltender Home Page.

| Preceded by Roland Melanson and Billy Smith | Winner of the Jennings Trophy; 1984 (with Al Jensen) | Succeeded by Tom Barrasso, Bob Sauve |
