= Seeding (sports) =

Preliminary ranking of a tournament competitor for the purposes of the draw

In sport, seeding is the practice of separating the most skilled competitors from each other in the early rounds of a tournament. Players or teams are "planted" into the bracket in such a manner that the best do not meet until later in the competition, usually based on ranking from the regular season. The term was first used in tennis, and is based on the notion of scattering the top players' names across the bracket in the way that a farmer scatters seeds.

Sometimes the remaining competitors in a single-elimination tournament will be "re-seeded" so that the highest surviving seed is made to play the lowest surviving seed in the next round, the second-highest plays the second-lowest, etc. This may be done after each round, or only at selected intervals.

== Tennis ==
Professional tennis tournaments seed players based on their rankings. The number of seeds varies from tournament to tournament. Generally, the bigger the event, the more seeds there tend to be relative to lesser events. The four major (Grand Slam) tournaments progressively expanded from 8-seed format to 16-seed, then to the current 32-seed format, which was adopted in the middle of the 2001 season, after French Open champion Gustavo Kuerten had complained that clay-court specialists were at a disadvantage with just 16 seeds.

In a tennis event, one version of seeding is where brackets are set up so that the quarterfinal pairings (barring any upsets) would be the 1 seed vs. the 8 seed, 2 vs. 7, 3 vs. 6 and 4 vs. 5. However, most tennis tournaments follow a different procedure, in which the 1 and 2 seeds are placed in separate brackets, but then the 3 and 4 seeds are assigned to their brackets randomly, and so are seeds 5 through 8, and so on. This may result in some brackets consisting of stronger players than other brackets. A further randomization derives from the fact that the top 32 players only are seeded in Tennis Grand Slam tournaments: therefore it is conceivable that the 33rd best player in a 128-player field could end up playing the top seed in the first round. A good example of this occurring was when World No. 33 Florian Mayer was drawn against (and eventually defeated by) then-World No. 1 Novak Djokovic in the first round of the 2013 Wimbledon Championships, in what was also a rematch of a quarter-final from the previous year. Rankings of tennis players, based on a history of performance, tend to change positions gradually, and so a more "equitable" method of determining the pairings might result in many of the same head-to-head match-ups being repeated in successive tournaments.

An example is given hereafter of a seeded 16-team bracket with no upsets (note that sums of the two seed numbers in each match are equal within a round: 17 for the first round, 9 for the quarterfinals, and 5 for the semi-finals):

First round
1
16
8
9
5
12
4
13
6
11
3
14
7
10
2
15

Quarterfinals
1
8
5
4
6
3
7
2

Semi-finals
1
4
3
2

Final
1
2

== Other sports ==
In American team sports, the NFL playoffs and WNBA playoffs employ re-seeding, and the NBA playoffs and the NCAA Division I men's basketball tournament do not. The Stanley Cup Playoffs used re-seeding between 1975 and 1981 and again from 1994 and 2013, and the MLS Cup Playoffs used re-seeding until 2018.

In some situations, a seeding restriction was implemented; from 1975 until 1989 in the NFL and from 1998 until 2011 in MLB, there was a rule, should the top seed and wild card be from the same division, they would not play each other in the first round; in those cases, the top seed played the third seed and the second seed played the wild card team. Since 2022, when enough teams made the playoffs where it would make a difference, MLB has also not employed re-seeding.

== Seeding in Major Football Tournaments ==
Seeding is a common practice in major football tournaments to ensure a balanced and competitive structure. The concept of seeding has evolved over time to improve the fairness of draws, reduce the likelihood of early eliminations for top teams, and ensure that teams from the same region or confederation are spread out across different groups or brackets where possible. Seeding is based on a variety of factors, including team performance in previous tournaments, rankings, and coefficients.

=== FIFA World Cup ===
The FIFA World Cup, first established in 1930, has used seeding from its early days. Seeding ensures that the top-ranked teams are distributed across different groups to avoid strong teams meeting in the early stages of the tournament. Originally, seeding was done manually by a selection committee, but with the advent of the FIFA World Rankings in 1992, the seeding process became more systematic and objective. The World Cup seeds are now primarily based on these rankings, which reflect the overall strength and performance of national teams in international matches.

Since the 1998 FIFA World Cup, the top-ranked teams are seeded into the "Pot 1" of the draw, while other teams are assigned to subsequent pots based on their FIFA rankings. Seeding is also influenced by geographical considerations, as teams from the same FIFA confederation (such as UEFA, CONMEBOL, or CAF) are generally kept apart in the group stage, with the exception of Europe, which may have multiple teams in a group due to the number of European teams participating.

=== UEFA Champions League ===
The UEFA Champions League adopted seeding in its qualification stages starting in the 1992–93 season, initially for the preliminary round. By the 1994–95 season, seeding was extended to the full tournament, ensuring that the top clubs based on historical performance were separated for the group stages.

Seeding in the Champions League is determined by a UEFA coefficient system, which takes into account the results of clubs in European competitions over the previous five seasons. These coefficients help create an equitable distribution of clubs into different pots during the group stage draw. Teams with higher coefficients are placed into higher pots, giving them a theoretical advantage in the draw by facing clubs with lower coefficients.

Similarly, the UEFA European Championship (Euro) also employs seeding, using national coefficients to determine the seeding of teams. The coefficient is based on a national team's performance in UEFA competitions, including the UEFA Nations League and qualification rounds.

=== FA Cup ===
In contrast to tournaments like the World Cup or Champions League, there is limited seeding in the FA Cup. In the FA Cup, clubs from higher divisions in the English football league system enter the draw at later rounds, but they are not kept apart within that round. This means that top-tier clubs, such as those from the Premier League, may face each other in the early rounds. The third round proper, when clubs from the top divisions enter, typically features a few matchups between Premier League sides.

=== Liga MX ===
In Liga MX, the seeding system is applied in the league playoffs. The teams with the higher seed advance if the match is drawn after the two-legged tie. This system ensures that teams with better regular-season records are rewarded in the postseason by having an advantage in the event of a draw, allowing them to progress to the next stage. The seeding for the playoffs is based on the total points accumulated during the regular season.
