= Willi Plett =

Paraguayan-born Canadian ice hockey player

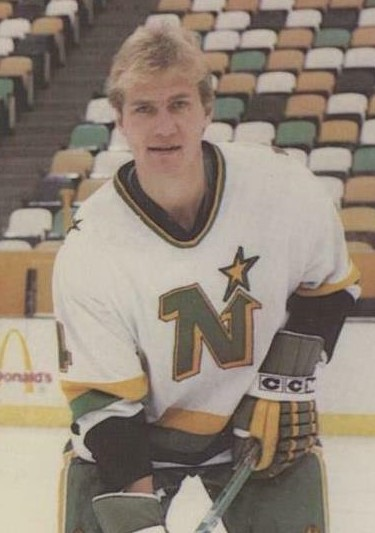
- Plett with the Minnesota North Stars in 1984
- Born: June 7, 1955 (age 71) Asunción, Paraguay
- Height: 6 ft 3 in (191 cm)
- Weight: 205 lb (93 kg; 14 st 9 lb)
- Position: Right wing
- Shot: Right
- Played for: Atlanta Flames; Calgary Flames; Minnesota North Stars; Boston Bruins
- NHL draft: 80th overall, 1975; Atlanta Flames
- Playing career: 1975–1988

Willi Plett (born June 7, 1955) is a Paraguayan-born Canadian former professional ice hockey right winger who played 834 games in the National Hockey League (NHL) for the Atlanta Flames, Calgary Flames, Minnesota North Stars and Boston Bruins. He reached the 1981 NHL playoff semifinals with the Flames and the 1984 NHL playoff semifinals with the North Stars.

He was a fifth-round selection of the Atlanta Flames in the 1975 NHL Amateur Draft, 80th overall. Plett was a member of the Tulsa Oilers' Adams Cup championship team in 1975–76 and won the Calder Memorial Trophy in 1977 as the NHL's top rookie. He transferred with the Flames franchise to Calgary in 1980 and a 1982 trade sent him to Minnesota where he played five seasons. Plett retired in 1988 following one season in Boston.

== Early life ==
Plett was born into a Russian Mennonite family who had lived in the Soviet Union and then Germany and fled to South America to escape the Second World War. They settled in Asunción, Paraguay, where he was born on June 7, 1955. His family moved to Canada one year later, settling in Niagara-on-the-Lake, Ontario.

Plett first played organized hockey at the age of 12 and played junior hockey near his hometown. He played three years in the St. Catharines Black Hawks system, but left the team midway through the 1974–75 Ontario Major Junior Hockey League season following a dispute with coach Hap Emms, joining the tier II Niagara Falls Flyers. His playing style was comparable to a modern power forward, as Plett combined scoring ability with physical play and a willingness to fight. The Atlanta Flames selected him with their fifth round selection, 80th overall, at the 1975 NHL Amateur Draft.

== Playing career ==
The Flames assigned Plett to their minor league affiliate, the Tulsa Oilers of the Central Hockey League (CHL), for the 1975–76 season where he developed under the team's coach, and former NHL enforcer, Orland Kurtenbach. He scored 30 goals in 73 games, added 163 penalty minutes, and helped the Oilers win the Adams Cup as CHL champions. Plett also made his NHL debut during the season, appearing in four games with the Flames.

Plett was returned to Tulsa to begin the 1976–77 season where he scored 12 points in 14 games. He spent the majority of the campaign in Atlanta, appearing in 64 games with the Flames. He scored 33 goals and 23 assists for the Flames, enough to win the Calder Memorial Trophy as the NHL's rookie of the year. He scored 22 goals in 1977–78 and 23 in 1978–79 and amassed nearly 400 penalty minutes over those two seasons as he established a reputation as an enforcer who could also score. Plett scored only 13 goals in 1979–80, but set a Flames' franchise record with 231 penalty minutes.

Plett transferred with the franchise when it relocated to Canada to become the Calgary Flames in 1980–81. Playing on the Flames' top line alongside Kent Nilsson and Guy Chouinard, Plett enjoyed his greatest season statistically, setting career highs with 38 goals, 68 points and 239 penalty minutes. He established himself as a fan favourite in Calgary, and shared the team playoff scoring lead with Bob MacMillan with eight goals as the Flames reached the semi-finals of the Stanley Cup playoffs. His offensive production fell to 21 goals in 1981–82, a season in which Plett became an outspoken critic of head coach Al MacNeil. The Flames replaced MacNeil as coach following the season, but also chose to trade Plett in a June 7, 1982 trade. He was sent to the Minnesota North Stars in exchange for Steve Christoff and Bill Nyrop, both teams also exchanged draft picks.

The NHL suspended Plett for eight games early in his first season with the North Stars after he was given a match penalty for slashing Detroit Red Wings goaltender Greg Stefan in the head. He scored 25 goals on the season but he recorded 19 fewer points than the year before and his 170 penalty minutes was his lowest total since his rookie season. He scored only 15 goals and 38 points in 1983–84 and quarreled with coach Bill Mahoney over playing time. Plett received more time after the two resolved their differences and he re-focused on the physical side of his game which had been lacking in the previous few seasons. He finished the season with a career high 319 penalty minutes. Plett was dogged by injuries in his following three seasons, missing time due to a groin injury and injuring his shoulders on several occasions. His offensive production decreased each year, falling to 11 points by 1986–87.

The North Stars traded Plett to the New York Rangers, in exchange for Pat Price, on September 7, 1987. He never played a game for New York, however, as the Boston Bruins took him in the waiver draft prior to the season's start. Plett appeared in 65 games for the Bruins in 1987–88, scoring two goals, five points and recording 170 penalty minutes. He appeared in 17 playoff games, scoring six points, as the Bruins reached the 1988 Stanley Cup Finals before losing to the Edmonton Oilers. Plett retired following the season.

== Career statistics ==
			Regular season					Playoffs
Season	Team	League	GP	G	A	Pts	PIM	GP	G	A	Pts	PIM
1974–75	St. Catharines Black Hawks	OMJHL	22	6	8	14	63	4	1	1	2	42
1975–76	Tulsa Oilers	CHL	76	30	20	50	163	9	5	4	9	21
1975–76	Atlanta Flames	NHL	4	0	0	0	0	—	—	—	—	—
1976–77	Tulsa Oilers	CHL	14	8	4	12	68	—	—	—	—	—
1976–77	Atlanta Flames	NHL	64	33	23	56	123	3	1	0	1	19
1977–78	Atlanta Flames	NHL	78	22	21	43	171	—	—	—	—	—
1978–79	Atlanta Flames	NHL	74	23	20	43	213	2	1	0	1	29
1979–80	Atlanta Flames	NHL	76	13	19	32	231	4	1	0	1	15
1980–81	Calgary Flames	NHL	78	38	30	68	239	15	8	4	12	89
1981–82	Calgary Flames	NHL	78	21	36	57	288	3	1	2	3	39
1982–83	Minnesota North Stars	NHL	71	25	14	39	170	9	1	3	4	38
1983–84	Minnesota North Stars	NHL	73	15	23	38	316	16	6	2	8	51
1984–85	Minnesota North Stars	NHL	47	14	14	28	157	9	3	6	9	67
1985–86	Minnesota North Stars	NHL	59	10	7	17	231	5	0	1	1	45
1986–87	Minnesota North Stars	NHL	67	6	5	11	263	—	—	—	—	—
1987–88	Boston Bruins	NHL	65	2	3	5	170	17	2	4	6	74
NHL totals			834	222	215	437	2,572	83	24	22	46	466

== See also ==
- List of NHL players with 2000 career penalty minutes

Preceded by Bryan Trottier	Winner of the Calder Memorial Trophy; 1977	Succeeded by Mike Bossy
