= Ken Houston (ice hockey) =

Canadian ice hockey player (1953–2018)

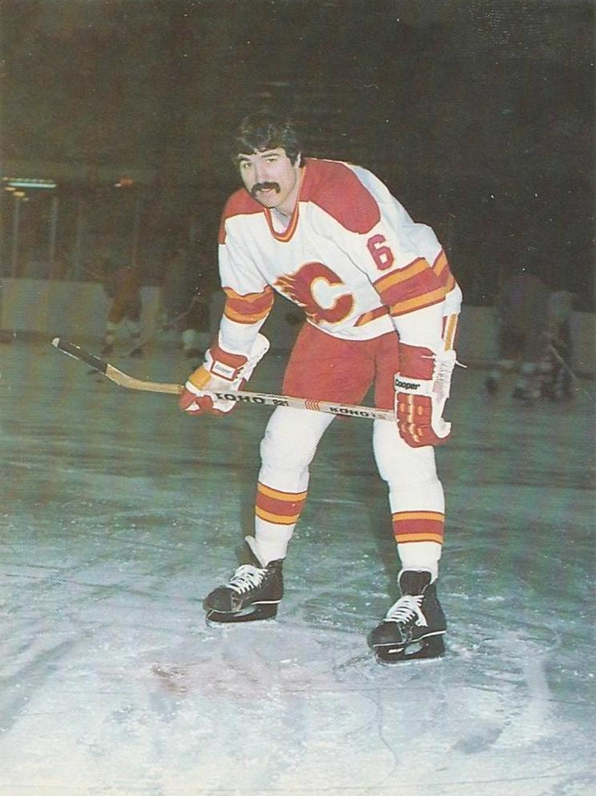
- Houston in 1980 photo
- Born: September 15, 1953 Dresden, Ontario, Canada
- Died: March 10, 2018 (aged 64) Chatham, Ontario, Canada
- Height: 6 ft 2 in (188 cm)
- Weight: 200 lb (91 kg; 14 st 4 lb)
- Position: Right wing
- Shot: Right
- Played for: Atlanta Flames; Calgary Flames; Washington Capitals; Los Angeles Kings
- NHL draft: 85th overall, 1973; Atlanta Flames
- WHA draft: 58th overall, 1973; Alberta Oilers
- Playing career: 1975–1984

Kenneth Lyle Houston (September 15, 1953 – March 10, 2018) was a Canadian ice hockey player who played nine seasons in the National Hockey League (NHL) between 1975 and 1984. He helped the Calgary Flames reach the NHL playoff semifinals for the first time in club history in 1981.

== Playing career ==
Originally drafted by the Atlanta Flames in the 1973 NHL entry draft, Houston played seven seasons for the franchise, including two after the team relocated to Calgary. He was traded along with Pat Riggin to the Washington Capitals following the 1981–82 NHL season.

Houston played for the Capitals until October 1983 when he was dealt along with Brian Engblom to the Los Angeles Kings in the trade that sent Larry Murphy to the Capitals. He retired at the end of the 1983–84 NHL season.

== Post-playing career ==
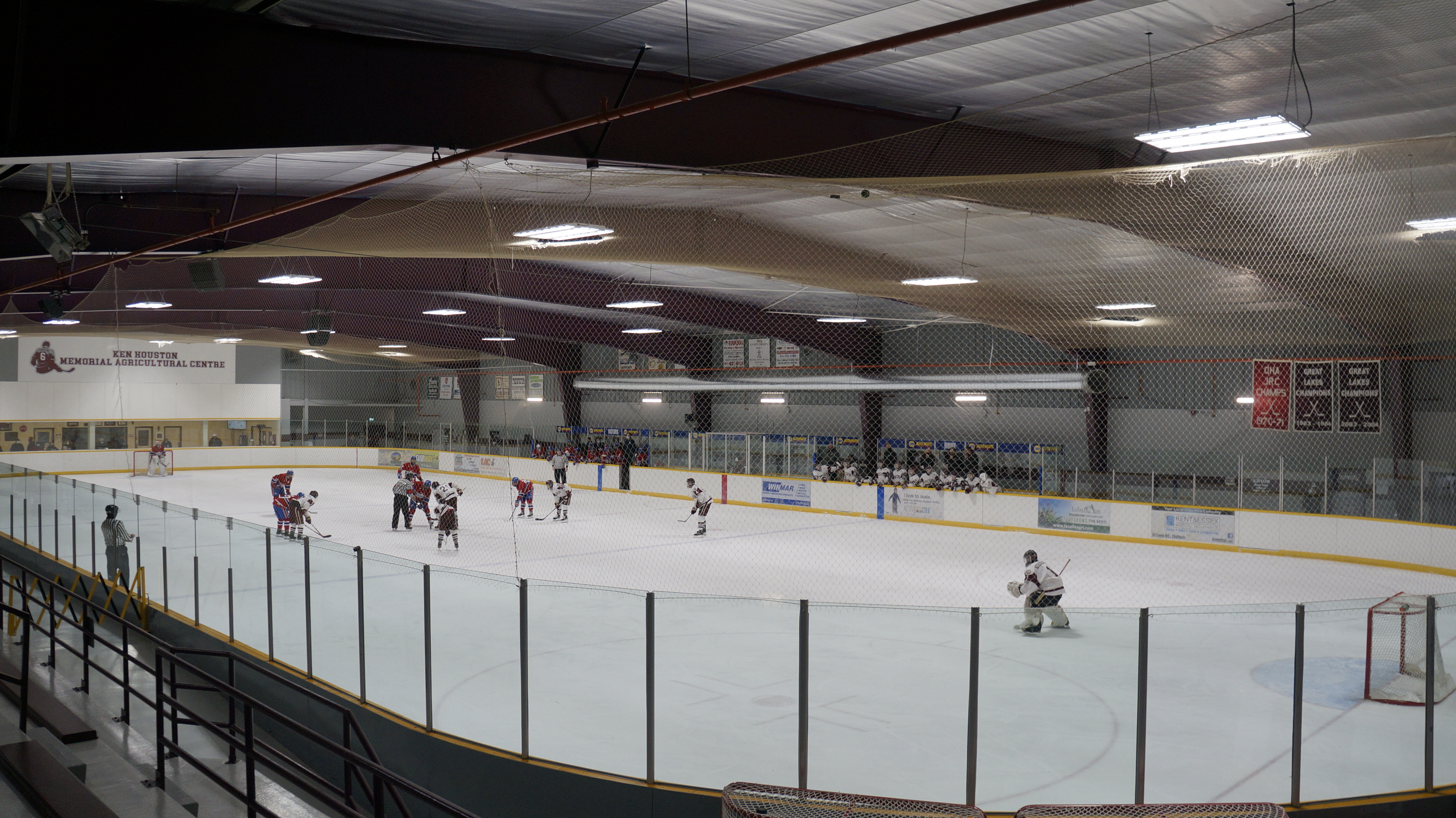
The Ken Houston Memorial Agricultural Centre in Dresden

Houston died of cancer on March 10, 2018.

The hockey arena in Dresden, Ontario, the Ken Houston Memorial Agricultural Centre, is named in his honour. An annual harness horse race at Dresden Raceway is dedicated to him.

=== Regular season and playoffs ===
			Regular season					Playoffs
Season	Team	League	GP	G	A	Pts	PIM	GP	G	A	Pts	PIM
1971–72	Chatham Junior Maroons	SOJHL	48	8	24	32	213	—	—	—	—	—
1972–73	Chatham Junior Maroons	SOJHL	52	14	41	55	60	—	—	—	—	—
1973–74	Omaha Knights	CHL	71	8	22	30	144	5	1	1	2	6
1974–75	Omaha Knights	CHL	78	9	32	41	158	6	1	7	8	8
1975–76	Atlanta Flames	NHL	38	5	6	11	11	2	0	0	0	0
1975–76	Nova Scotia Voyageurs	AHL	27	14	15	29	56	—	—	—	—	—
1976–77	Atlanta Flames	NHL	78	20	24	44	35	3	0	0	0	4
1977–78	Atlanta Flames	NHL	74	22	16	38	51	2	0	0	0	0
1978–79	Atlanta Flames	NHL	80	21	31	52	135	1	0	0	0	16
1979–80	Atlanta Flames	NHL	80	23	31	54	100	4	1	1	2	10
1980–81	Calgary Flames	NHL	42	15	15	30	93	16	7	8	15	28
1981–82	Calgary Flames	NHL	70	22	22	44	91	3	1	0	1	4
1982–83	Washington Capitals	NHL	71	25	14	39	93	4	1	0	1	4
1983–84	Washington Capitals	NHL	4	0	0	0	4	—	—	—	—	—
1983–84	Los Angeles Kings	NHL	33	8	8	16	11	—	—	—	—	—
NHL totals			570	161	167	328	624	35	10	9	19	66
