= Steve Payne (ice hockey) =

Canadian ice hockey player

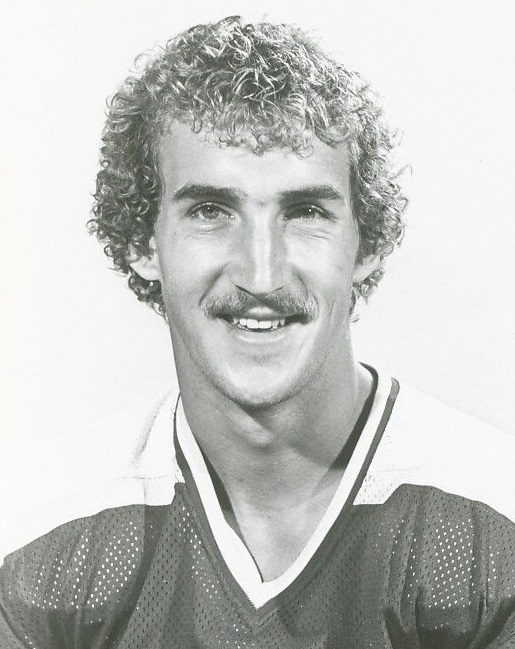
- Payne with the Minnesota North Stars in 1981
- Born: August 16, 1958 (age 67) Toronto, Ontario, Canada
- Height: 6 ft 3 in (191 cm)
- Weight: 220 lb (100 kg; 15 st 10 lb)
- Position: Left wing
- Shot: Left
- Played for: Minnesota North Stars
- National team: Canada
- NHL draft: 19th overall, 1978; Minnesota North Stars
- Playing career: 1978–1988

Steven John Payne (born August 16, 1958) is a Canadian former professional ice hockey left winger who played for the Minnesota North Stars of the National Hockey League between 1978 and 1988. He played his entire NHL career with Minnesota and was forced into retirement by multiple cervical spine injuries.

== Biography ==
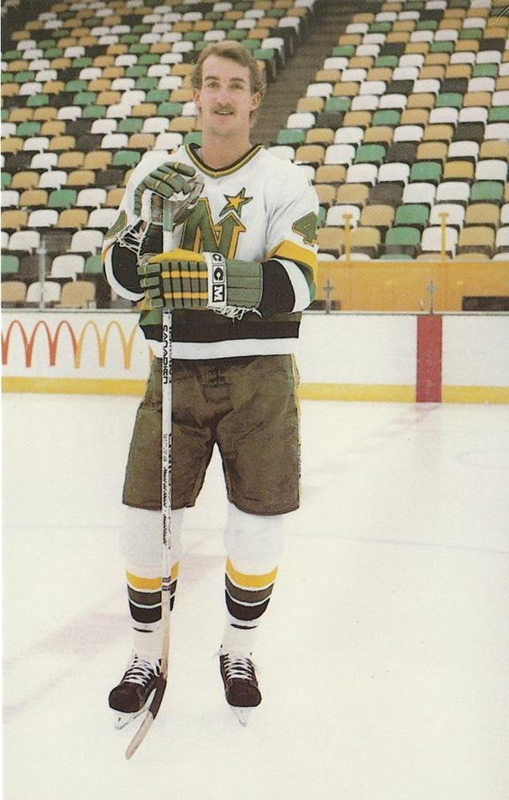
1984 postcard of Payne for Minnesota North Stars

As a youth, he played in the 1971 Quebec International Pee-Wee Hockey Tournament with a minor ice hockey team from Toronto.

Payne was drafted 19th overall by Minnesota in the 1978 NHL Amateur Draft. Payne played 613 career NHL games, scoring 228 goals and 238 assists for 466 points. His best season statistically was the 1979–80 season. He set career highs in goals (42), points (85), power-play goals (16), and plus minus with a +37 rating. He retired as the team's all-time highest scoring left wing as well as their all-time leading playoff scorer and led the North Stars to their first Stanley Cup Finals appearance in 1981, with 17 goals and 12 assists in 19 games. In his book Minnesota North Stars History and Memories with Lou Nanne, Nanne stated, "The best clutch goal scorer we ever had was Steve Payne. He got more big goals than anyone." as supported by his career playoff performance of 9 game winning goals, 3 in overtime.

He played in the 1980 and 1985 NHL All-Star Games. He also played for Canada in the 1979 World Championship and the '81 Canada Cup.

Payne is a long time supporter of the US military. He worked for the United Heroes League (UHL) from 2019-2025 as the director of the UHL Outdoors program that took military parents and their children fishing with sports celebrities from the NHL, NFL and MLB at various locations around the US and Canada.

Payne has also supported the non-profit Project Healing Waters Fly Fishing, as the founder and director of the "Battle at Boxwood", a fundraising fly fishing event held from 2011 - 2018 at the Boxwood Gulch Ranch near Shawnee, Colorado. The event featured 20 recovering military members fishing with celebrities from the NHL, NFL and music industry and was featured on the outdoor TV series, Fly Rod Chronicles and Sportsman360, as well as in the special TV feature, "Embracing Our Troops".

He has a son, daughter, five grandsons and lives with his wife Kim in rural West-Central Wisconsin.

== Career statistics ==
=== Regular season and playoffs ===
			Regular season					Playoffs
Season	Team	League	GP	G	A	Pts	PIM	GP	G	A	Pts	PIM
1976–77	Ottawa 67's	OMJHL	61	21	26	47	22	19	4	14	18	5
1976–77	Ottawa 67s	M-Cup	—	—	—	—	—	5	1	0	1	0
1977–78	Ottawa 67's	OMJHL	52	57	37	94	22	16	12	8	20	4
1978–79	Oklahoma City Stars	CHL	5	3	4	7	2	—	—	—	—	—
1978–79	Minnesota North Stars	NHL	70	23	17	40	29	—	—	—	—	—
1979–80	Minnesota North Stars	NHL	80	42	43	85	40	15	7	7	14	9
1980–81	Minnesota North Stars	NHL	76	30	28	58	88	19	17	12	29	6
1981–82	Minnesota North Stars	NHL	74	33	45	78	76	4	4	2	6	2
1982–83	Minnesota North Stars	NHL	80	30	39	69	53	9	3	6	9	19
1983–84	Minnesota North Stars	NHL	78	28	31	59	49	15	3	6	9	18
1984–85	Minnesota North Stars	NHL	76	29	22	51	61	9	1	2	3	6
1985–86	Minnesota North Stars	NHL	22	8	4	12	8	—	—	—	—	—
1986–87	Minnesota North Stars	NHL	48	4	6	10	19	—	—	—	—	—
1987–88	Minnesota North Stars	NHL	9	1	3	4	12	—	—	—	—	—
1987–88	Kalamazoo Wings	IHL	5	3	5	8	6	—	—	—	—	—
NHL totals			613	228	238	466	435	71	35	35	70	60

=== International ===
Year	Team	Event	GP	G	A	Pts	PIM
1979	Canada	WC	7	2	0	2	2
Senior totals			7	2	0	2	2
