= Ron Meighan =

Canadian ice hockey player (born 1963)

- Born: May 26, 1963 (age 62) Montreal, Quebec, Canada
- Height: 6 ft 3 in (191 cm)
- Weight: 195 lb (88 kg; 13 st 13 lb)
- Position: Defence
- Shot: Right
- Played for: Minnesota North Stars; Pittsburgh Penguins
- NHL draft: 13th overall, 1981; Minnesota North Stars
- Playing career: 1981–1984

Ron James Meighan (born May 26, 1963) is a Canadian former professional ice hockey defenceman.

== Biography ==
Meighan was born in Montreal, Quebec. As a youth, he played in the 1975 Quebec International Pee-Wee Hockey Tournament with a minor ice hockey team from Gloucester, Ontario. He was awarded the Max Kaminsky Trophy as the most outstanding defenceman in the Ontario Hockey League, during the 1981–82 OHL season.

He was drafted in the first round, 13th overall, by the Minnesota North Stars in the 1981 NHL entry draft. He played forty-eight games in the National Hockey League: seven with the North Stars in the 1981–82 season and forty-one more with the Pittsburgh Penguins in the 1982–83 season.

== Career statistics ==
			Regular season					Playoffs
Season	Team	League	GP	G	A	Pts	PIM	GP	G	A	Pts	PIM
1979–80	Niagara Falls Flyers	OMJHL	61	3	10	13	20	10	0	0	0	6
1980–81	Niagara Falls Flyers	OHL	63	8	27	35	92	12	0	0	0	14
1981–82	Niagara Falls Flyers	OHL	58	27	41	68	85	4	0	4	4	9
1981–82	Minnesota North Stars	NHL	7	1	1	2	2	—	—	—	—	—
1982–83	North Bay Centennials	OHL	29	19	22	41	30	—	—	—	—	—
1982–83	Pittsburgh Penguins	NHL	41	2	6	8	16	—	—	—	—	—
1983–84	Baltimore Skipjacks	AHL	75	4	16	20	36	—	—	—	—	—
OMJHL/OHL totals			211	57	100	157	227	16	0	4	4	23
NHL totals			48	3	7	10	18	—	—	—	—	—

Preceded by Brad Palmer	Minnesota North Stars first-round draft pick 1981	Succeeded by Brian Bellows
Preceded by Randy Boyd	Winner of the Max Kaminsky Trophy; 1981–82	Succeeded by Al MacInnis
