= Steve Baker (ice hockey) =

American ice hockey player (born 1957)

- Born: May 6, 1957 (age 69) Boston, Massachusetts, U.S.
- Height: 6 ft 3 in (191 cm)
- Weight: 200 lb (91 kg; 14 st 4 lb)
- Position: Goaltender
- Caught: Left
- Played for: New York Rangers
- National team: United States
- NHL draft: 44th overall, 1977; New York Rangers
- WHA draft: 40th overall, 1977; Birmingham Bulls
- Playing career: 1977–1984

Steve Baker (born May 6, 1957) is an American retired ice hockey goaltender who played 57 games in the National Hockey League with the New York Rangers between 1979 and 1983. The rest of his career, which lasted from 1977 to 1984, was spent in the minor leagues.

== Early life ==
Baker was born in Boston and raised in Braintree, Massachusetts. He was a member of the Union College men's hockey team, resigning in protest when his coach Ned Harkness was forced to resign.

== Career ==
Baker was drafted by the Rangers with the 44th pick overall in the 1977 NHL entry draft. Highlights of his brief NHL career include losing only one of his first ten National Hockey League games as a rookie in 1979–80 and the 1981 playoffs, when the Rangers advanced to the Stanley Cup semifinals with him as their starting goalie. In the autumn of 1981, Baker served as Tony Esposito's backup on the United States team at the 1981 Canada Cup.

== Personal life ==
Baker and his wife, Rosemary, have two children.

== Career statistics ==
=== Regular season and playoffs ===
			Regular season									Playoffs
Season	Team	League	GP	W	L	T	MIN	GA	SO	GAA	SV%	GP	W	L	MIN	GA	SO	GAA	SV%
1974–75	Owen Sound Salvagemen	CJCHL	22	—	—	—	1320	38	5	1.73	—	—	—	—	—	—	—	—	—
1975–76	Union College	ECAC 2	9	8	1	0	480	21	0	2.62	—	—	—	—	—	—	—	—	—
1976–77	Union College	ECAC 2	19	16	3	0	1117	67	0	3.60	—	2	1	1	120	10	0	5.00	—
1977–78	Union College	ECAC 2	5	3	1	1	300	16	0	3.20	—	—	—	—	—	—	—	—	—
1977–78	Toledo Goaldiggers	IHL	10	—	—	—	544	46	0	5.07	—	—	—	—	—	—	—	—	—
1978–79	New Haven Nighthawks	AHL	24	15	5	4	1435	82	1	3.43	.885	5	2	3	297	17	0	3.43	—
1979–80	New York Rangers	NHL	27	9	8	6	1390	79	1	3.41	.882	—	—	—	—	—	—	—	—
1979–80	New Haven Nighthawks	AHL	9	6	1	1	492	29	0	3.54	.891	—	—	—	—	—	—	—	—
1980–81	New York Rangers	NHL	21	10	6	5	1257	73	2	3.49	.880	14	7	7	824	55	0	4.01	.856
1980–81	New Haven Nighthawks	AHL	25	10	11	4	1497	90	1	3.57	.887	—	—	—	—	—	—	—	—
1981–82	New York Rangers	NHL	6	1	5	0	329	33	0	6.03	.795	—	—	—	—	—	—	—	—
1981–82	Springfield Indians	AHL	11	2	7	1	503	42	0	5.01	.887	—	—	—	—	—	—	—	—
1982–83	New York Rangers	NHL	3	0	1	0	101	5	0	2.98	.881	—	—	—	—	—	—	—	—
1982–83	Tulsa Oilers (1964–1984)	CHL	49	22	27	0	2901	186	0	3.85	.867	—	—	—	—	—	—	—	—
1983–84	Binghamton Whalers	AHL	6	0	4	1	345	35	0	6.09	.833	—	—	—	—	—	—	—	—
1983–84	Maine Mariners	AHL	13	5	5	2	744	41	0	3.31	.894	6	3	3	353	23	0	3.91	—
NHL totals			57	20	20	11	3075	190	3	3.71	.872	14	7	7	824	55	0	4.01	.856

=== International ===
Year	Team	Event	GP	W	L	T	MIN	GA	SO	GAA	SV%
1981	United States	CC	1	0	0	1	60	4	0	4.00	.818
Senior totals			1	0	0	1	60	4	0	4.00	.818
