= Dan Bouchard =

Canadian ice hockey player

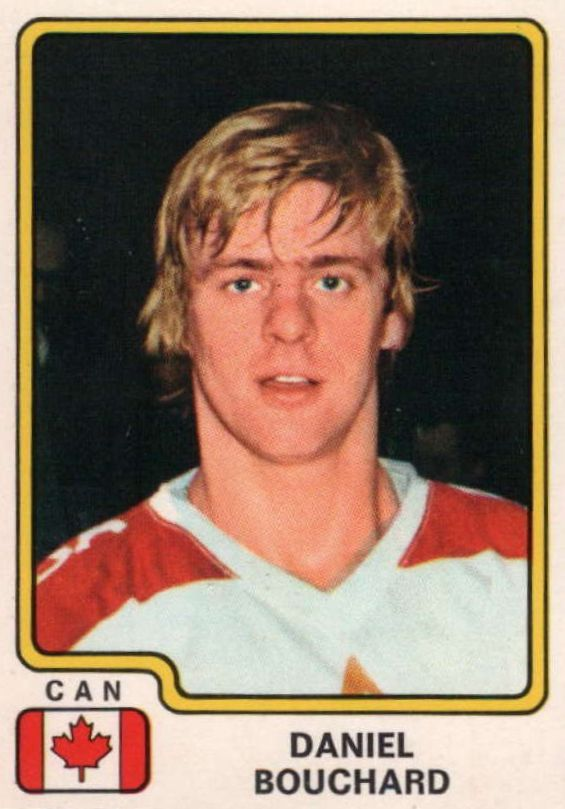
- Born: December 12, 1950 (age 75) Val-d'Or, Quebec, Canada
- Height: 6 ft 0 in (183 cm)
- Weight: 190 lb (86 kg; 13 st 8 lb)
- Position: Goaltender
- Shot: Left
- Played for: Atlanta Flames; Calgary Flames; Quebec Nordiques; Winnipeg Jets
- National team: Canada
- NHL draft: 27th overall, 1970; Boston Bruins
- Playing career: 1970–1987
Medal record
Representing Canada
World Championships
Bronze medal – third place	1978 Czechoslovakia

Daniel Hector Bouchard (born December 12, 1950) is a Canadian former professional ice hockey goaltender. He played in the National Hockey League (NHL) with the Atlanta Flames, Calgary Flames, Quebec Nordiques, and original Winnipeg Jets.

== Career ==
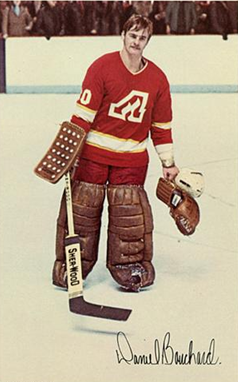
Dan Bouchard of Atlanta Flames in 1972

Bouchard played in the 1962 and 1963 Quebec International Pee-Wee Hockey Tournaments with his LaSalle youth team. As a junior, Bouchard backstopped the Sorel Black Hawks to the 1969 Memorial Cup. Bouchard was drafted by the Boston Bruins in 1970, and after two years in the American Hockey League, made his NHL debut in 1972–73 after the Flames claimed him in the 1972 NHL Expansion Draft. After eight seasons in Atlanta, the Flames franchise relocated to Calgary, Alberta in the summer of 1980. Halfway through the 1980–81 season, Bouchard was traded to the Quebec Nordiques for Jamie Hislop; at the time of the trade, Bouchard was the last original Atlanta Flames player still with the organization. He then led Quebec to their first playoff appearance since the 1979 NHL–WHA merger.

The following season was a magical one as the Nordiques lost in the Wales Conference Final to the defending champion New York Islanders, who would go on to win their third straight Stanley Cup. Along the way, Quebec disposed of the Montreal Canadiens, their most bitter rival, and then Boston in a pair of thrilling series. Each went down to the wire in the final game, but Quebec held on to win. In the 1985–86 season he was traded to the Winnipeg Jets, where he left the NHL after losing in the opening round to the Calgary Flames. He played 7 games for HC Fribourg-Gottéron in the 1986–87 season before a knee injury forced his retirement.

== Personal life ==
Bouchard currently lives in Atlanta, Georgia, where he privately trains goalies and serves as the head goalie coach at The Cooler for the Atlanta Fire Team.

== Career statistics ==
=== Regular season and playoffs ===
			Regular season									Playoffs
Season	Team	League	GP	W	L	T	MIN	GA	SO	GAA	SV%	GP	W	L	T	MIN	GA	SO	GAA	SV%
1968–69	Sorel Black Hawks	MMJHL	—	—	—	—	—	—	—	—	—	—	—	—	—	—	—	—	—	—
1968–69	Sorel Black Hawks	M-Cup	—	—	—	—	—	—	—	—	—	19	14	5	0	1140	65	1	3.42	—
1969–70	London Knights	OHA-Jr.	41	—	—	—	2452	159	2	3.89	—	12	4	5	3	711	48	0	4.05	—
1970–71	Hershey Bears	AHL	36	12	16	2	2029	106	1	3.13	—	—	—	—	—	—	—	—	—	—
1971–72	Boston Braves	AHL	50	27	13	7	2915	122	4	2.51	—	6	2	3	—	311	14	0	2.70	—
1971–72	Oklahoma City Blazers	CHL	1	1	0	0	60	3	0	3.00	—	—	—	—	—	—	—	—	—	—
1972–73	Atlanta Flames	NHL	34	9	15	10	1944	100	2	3.09	.907	—	—	—	—	—	—	—	—	—
1973–74	Atlanta Flames	NHL	46	19	18	8	2660	123	5	2.77	.909	1	0	1	—	60	4	0	4.00	.846
1974–75	Atlanta Flames	NHL	40	20	15	5	2400	111	3	2.78	.914	—	—	—	—	—	—	—	—	—
1975–76	Atlanta Flames	NHL	47	19	17	8	2671	113	2	2.54	.911	2	0	2	—	120	3	0	1.50	.942
1976–77	Atlanta Flames	NHL	42	17	17	5	2378	139	1	3.51	.877	1	0	1	—	60	5	0	5.00	.800
1977–78	Atlanta Flames	NHL	58	25	12	19	3340	153	2	2.75	.894	2	0	2	—	120	7	0	3.50	.851
1978–79	Atlanta Flames	NHL	64	32	21	7	3624	201	3	3.33	.889	2	0	2	—	100	9	0	5.40	.813
1979–80	Atlanta Flames	NHL	53	23	19	10	3076	163	2	3.18	.897	4	1	3	—	241	14	0	3.49	.880
1980–81	Calgary Flames	NHL	14	4	5	3	760	51	0	4.03	.884	—	—	—	—	—	—	—	—	—
1980–81	Quebec Nordiques	NHL	29	19	5	5	1740	92	2	3.17	.895	5	2	3	—	286	19	1	3.99	.881
1981–82	Quebec Nordiques	NHL	60	27	22	11	3572	230	1	3.86	.866	11	4	7	—	677	38	0	3.37	.894
1982–83	Quebec Nordiques	NHL	50	20	21	8	2947	197	1	4.01	.875	4	1	3	—	242	11	0	2.73	.909
1983–84	Quebec Nordiques	NHL	57	29	18	8	3373	180	1	3.20	.882	9	5	4	—	543	25	0	2.76	.888
1984–85	Quebec Nordiques	NHL	29	12	13	4	1738	101	0	3.49	.877	1	0	1	—	60	7	0	7.00	.708
1985–86	Winnipeg Jets	NHL	32	11	14	2	1696	107	2	3.79	.865	1	0	1	—	40	5	0	7.50	.773
1986–87	HC Fribourg–Gottéron	NDA	7	—	—	—	151	7	0	2.78	—	—	—	—	—	—	—	—	—	—
NHL totals			655	286	232	113	37,919	2061	27	3.26	.890	43	13	30	—	2549	147	1	3.46	.880

=== International ===
Year	Team	Event	GP	W	L	T	MIN	GA	SO	GAA	SV%
1978	Canada	WC	6	2	4	-	344	24	0	4.19	.886

"Bouchard's stats". The Goaltender Home Page.
