= Perry Berezan =

Canadian former ice hockey centre

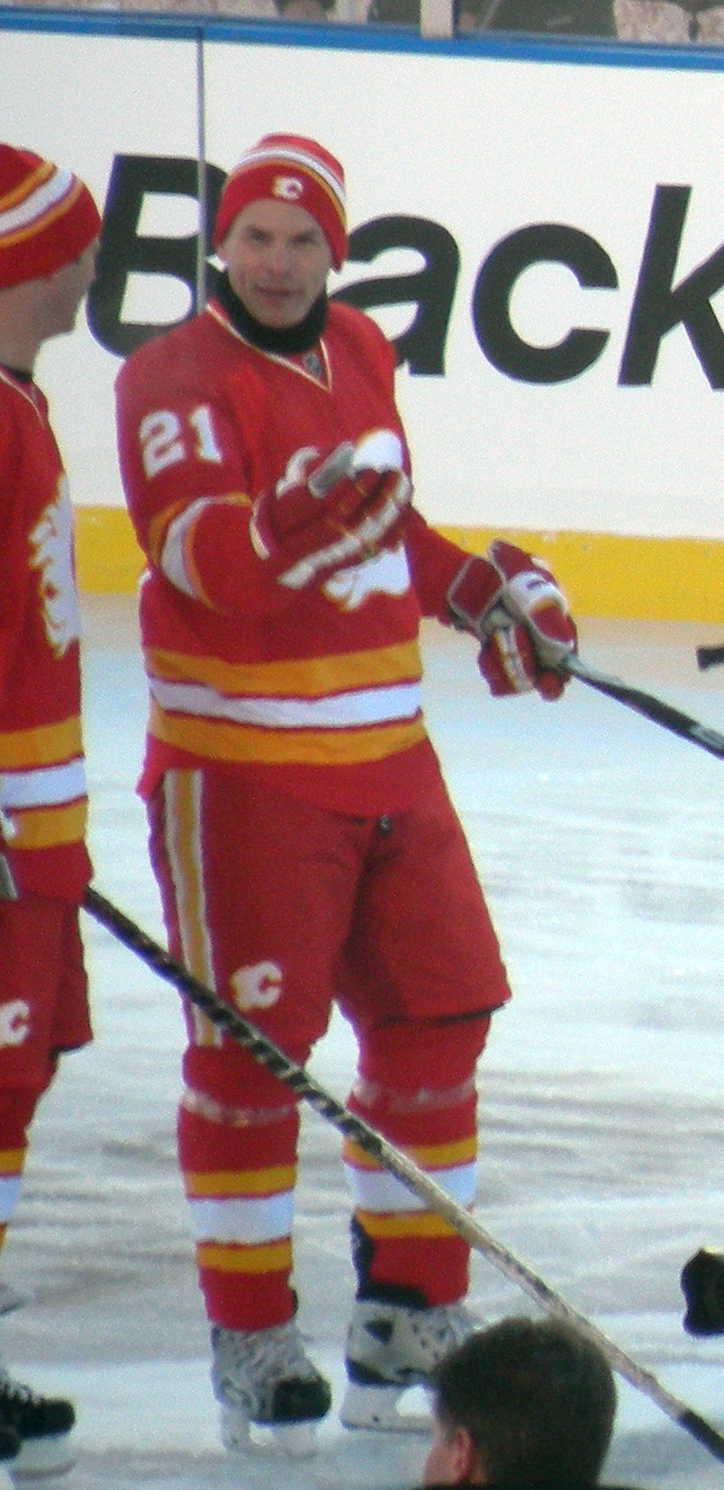
- Born: December 5, 1964 (age 61) Edmonton, Alberta, Canada
- Height: 6 ft 2 in (188 cm)
- Weight: 192 lb (87 kg; 13 st 10 lb)
- Position: Centre
- Shot: Right
- Played for: Calgary Flames; Minnesota North Stars; San Jose Sharks
- NHL draft: 55th overall, 1983; Calgary Flames
- Playing career: 1985–1993

Perry Edmund Berezan (born December 5, 1964) is a Canadian former ice hockey centre who played nine seasons in the National Hockey League (NHL) between 1985 and 1993. He was a third round selection, 55th overall, of the Calgary Flames at the 1983 NHL entry draft and also played for the Minnesota North Stars and San Jose Sharks. He is an alumnus of the University of North Dakota hockey program.

== Playing career ==
=== Junior and college ===
A native of Edmonton, Alberta, Berezan played two seasons of Junior A with the St. Albert Saints of the Alberta Junior Hockey League (AJHL) between 1981 and 1983. In 104 games for the Saints, Berezan recorded 53 goals and 129 points. He was later recognized by the AJHL as one of its top-50 all-time players during the league's 50th anniversary in 2013–14.

The Calgary Flames selected Berezan with their third selection, 55th overall, at the 1983 NHL entry draft, however he opted to first play college hockey with the North Dakota Fighting Sioux. In his freshman season of 1983–84, Berezan tied with Dan Brennan for the team lead at 28 goals. Berezan recorded 52 points as a freshman, and improved to 58 in 1984–85 as a sophomore. He recorded his 100th career point in his 75th game. At the time, he became the second fastest in school history to reach the milestone (Troy Murray, 50 games).

=== Professional ===
Opting to leave North Dakota after two seasons, Berezan turned professional and joined the Flames late in the 1984–85 NHL season. He appeared in nine games with Calgary and scored a point in each of his first four contests; Berezan's first NHL goal was scored March 20, 1985, against the Toronto Maple Leafs.

Though an offensive player in junior and college, Berezan was converted to a defensive forward in the NHL. He posted 12 goals and 33 points in his first full season, 1985–86. He was credited with one goal during the playoffs following one of the most infamous blunders in NHL history. In the seventh game of the Smythe Division Final against the Edmonton Oilers, Berezan dumped the puck into the Edmonton zone before leaving the ice on a line change. Oilers defenceman Steve Smith recovered the puck behind his net and accidentally passed it off goaltender Grant Fuhr's skate and into his own goal. As the last Flame to touch the puck, Berezan was credited with the goal even though he was on the bench when the puck went in. It proved to be the deciding marker in a 3–2 Calgary victory that also clinched the series.

Injuries plagued Berezan throughout his tenure with Calgary. Among his injuries over his five seasons with the Flames, Berezan missed time due to a groin injury, broken leg, food poisoning and a concussion suffered following a hit by Edmonton's Mark Messier in 1988. After appearing in 55 games in his rookie season, Berezan played only 24 and 29 games his following two years. He had appeared in 35 games for the Flames in 1988–89 when, on March 4, 1989, he was traded. The Flames sent Berezan and Shane Churla to the Minnesota North Stars in exchange for Brian MacLellan and a fourth round pick at the 1989 NHL entry draft.

Berezan appeared in 16 games with the North Stars to complete the season and finished the year with a combined 51 games played, 5 goals and 13 points. He played 64 games in 1989–90, recording 15 points, and upped that to 17 points in 52 games in 1990–91. He left Minnesota following the season and signed a contract with the expansion San Jose Sharks. After recording 19 points in a career-high 66 games in 1991–92, Berezan split the following season between the Sharks and their International Hockey League (IHL) affiliate, the Kansas City Blades. He retired in 1993.

== Personal life ==
After leaving hockey, Berezan returned to the University of North Dakota where he earned a commerce degree and became a financial planner and investment advisor. Berezan and his wife, Marie, have three children and settled in Calgary. An active member of the Calgary community, Berezan is associated with the Alberta Pro-Am hockey tournaments that raise money to fight Alzheimer's disease. A longtime member of the Calgary Flames Alumni Association, Berezan also supports causes like the Special Olympics and KidSport Calgary.

== Career statistics ==
=== Regular season and playoffs ===
			Regular season					Playoffs
Season	Team	League	GP	G	A	Pts	PIM	GP	G	A	Pts	PIM
1981–82	St. Albert Saints	AJHL	47	16	36	52	47	—	—	—	—	—
1982–83	St. Albert Saints	AJHL	57	37	40	77	110	—	—	—	—	—
1983–84	University of North Dakota	WCHA	44	28	24	52	29	—	—	—	—	—
1984–85	University of North Dakota	WCHA	42	23	35	58	32	—	—	—	—	—
1984–85	Calgary Flames	NHL	9	3	2	5	4	2	1	0	1	4
1985–86	Calgary Flames	NHL	55	12	21	33	39	8	1	1	2	6
1986–87	Calgary Flames	NHL	24	5	3	8	24	2	0	2	2	7
1987–88	Calgary Flames	NHL	29	7	12	19	66	8	0	2	2	13
1988–89	Calgary Flames	NHL	35	4	4	8	21	—	—	—	—	—
1988–89	Minnesota North Stars	NHL	16	1	4	5	4	5	1	2	3	4
1989–90	Minnesota North Stars	NHL	64	3	12	15	31	5	1	0	1	0
1990–91	Minnesota North Stars	NHL	52	11	6	17	30	1	0	0	0	0
1990–91	Kalamazoo Wings	IHL	2	0	0	0	2	—	—	—	—	—
1991–92	San Jose Sharks	NHL	66	12	7	19	30	—	—	—	—	—
1992–93	San Jose Sharks	NHL	28	3	4	7	28	—	—	—	—	—
1992–93	Kansas City Blades	IHL	9	4	4	8	31	—	—	—	—	—
NHL totals			378	61	75	136	277	31	4	7	11	34
