= Hector Marini =

Canadian ice hockey player (born 1957)

- Born: January 27, 1957 (age 69) Timmins, Ontario, Canada
- Height: 6 ft 1 in (185 cm)
- Weight: 204 lb (93 kg; 14 st 8 lb)
- Position: Right wing
- Shot: Right
- Played for: NHL; New York Islanders; New Jersey Devils; AHL; Maine Mariners
- NHL draft: 50th overall, 1977; New York Islanders
- Playing career: 1978–1986

Joseph Hector Marini (born January 27, 1957) is a Canadian former ice hockey forward.

Born in Timmins, Ontario, Marini started his National Hockey League career with the New York Islanders. He also played with the New Jersey Devils. His career lasted from 1979 to 1984. Marini also played in the 1983 NHL All-Star Game. He won the Stanley Cup with the Islanders in 1981 and 1982.

Marini's career ended with an injury on December 5, 1985 while playing for the Fort Wayne Komets. The injury resulted in the loss of his left eye.

== Career statistics ==
			Regular season					Playoffs
Season	Team	League	GP	G	A	Pts	PIM	GP	G	A	Pts	PIM
1974–75	Sudbury Wolves	OMJHL	69	12	19	31	70	15	2	6	8	9
1975–76	Sudbury Wolves	OMJHL	66	32	45	77	102	17	7	5	12	32
1976–77	Sudbury Wolves	OMJHL	64	32	58	90	89	6	1	3	4	9
1977–78	Fort Worth Texans	CHL	2	0	0	0	4	—	—	—	—	—
1977–78	Muskegon Mohawks	IHL	80	33	60	93	127	6	7	4	11	5
1978–79	New York Islanders	NHL	1	0	0	0	2	1	0	0	0	0
1978–79	Fort Worth Texans	CHL	74	21	27	48	172	5	1	4	5	7
1979–80	Indianapolis Checkers	CHL	76	29	34	63	144	7	1	4	5	20
1980–81	New York Islanders	NHL	14	4	7	11	39	9	3	6	9	14
1980–81	Indianapolis Checkers	CHL	54	15	37	52	85	—	—	—	—	—
1981–82	New York Islanders	NHL	30	4	9	13	53	—	—	—	—	—
1982–83	New Jersey Devils	NHL	77	17	28	45	105	—	—	—	—	—
1983–84	New Jersey Devils	NHL	32	2	2	4	47	—	—	—	—	—
1983–84	Maine Mariners	AHL	17	7	4	11	23	—	—	—	—	—
1984–85	Maine Mariners	AHL	30	1	5	6	67	—	—	—	—	—
1985–86	Maine Mariners	AHL	6	0	5	5	17	—	—	—	—	—
1985–86	Fort Wayne Komets	IHL	7	1	1	2	5	—	—	—	—	—
CHL totals			206	65	98	163	405	12	2	8	10	27
NHL totals			154	27	46	73	246	10	3	6	9	14
