= Alan Haworth (ice hockey) =

Canadian ice hockey player

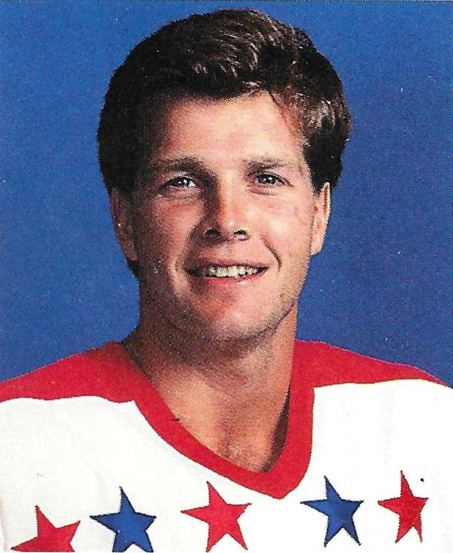
- Born: September 1, 1960 (age 65) Drummondville, Quebec, Canada
- Height: 5 ft 10 in (178 cm)
- Weight: 190 lb (86 kg; 13 st 8 lb)
- Position: Centre
- Shot: Right
- Played for: Buffalo Sabres; Washington Capitals; Quebec Nordiques; SC Bern
- National team: Canada
- NHL draft: 95th overall, 1979; Buffalo Sabres
- Playing career: 1980–1992

Alan Joseph Gordon Haworth (born September 1, 1960) is a Canadian former professional ice hockey player, who played in the National Hockey League (NHL) between 1980 and 1988. He is the son of Gordie Haworth and the brother of Carey Haworth.

== Playing career ==
Selected in the 1979 NHL entry draft by the Buffalo Sabres, Haworth was traded to the Washington Capitals in 1982. After five seasons in Washington, he was dealt to the Quebec Nordiques in 1987 in the trade that brought Dale Hunter to the Capitals. After one season in Quebec, Haworth opted to play in Switzerland for four seasons, winning two Swiss championships with SC Bern, before retiring from active play. His NHL rights were traded to the Minnesota North Stars for the retired Guy Lafleur after the 1991 NHL Expansion Draft, though neither of them would play in the NHL again.

In 524 NHL games, he scored 189 goals and had 211 assists. As of 2015–16, Haworth is a scout for the Washington Capitals.

== Career statistics ==
=== Regular season and playoffs ===
			Regular season					Playoffs
Season	Team	League	GP	G	A	Pts	PIM	GP	G	A	Pts	PIM
1976–77	Chicoutimi Sagueneens	QMJHL	68	11	18	29	15	8	1	1	2	7
1977–78	Chicoutimi Sagueneens	QMJHL	59	17	33	50	40	—	—	—	—	—
1978–79	Sherbrooke Castors	QMJHL	70	50	70	120	63	12	6	10	16	8
1979–80	Sherbrooke Castors	QMJHL	45	28	36	64	50	15	11	16	27	4
1980–81	Rochester Americans	AHL	21	14	18	32	19	—	—	—	—	—
1980–81	Buffalo Sabres	NHL	49	16	20	36	34	7	4	4	8	2
1981–82	Rochester Americans	AHL	14	5	12	17	10	—	—	—	—	—
1981–82	Buffalo Sabres	NHL	57	21	18	39	30	3	0	1	1	2
1982–83	Washington Capitals	NHL	74	23	27	50	34	4	0	0	0	2
1983–84	Washington Capitals	NHL	75	24	31	55	52	8	3	2	5	4
1984–85	Washington Capitals	NHL	76	23	26	49	48	5	1	0	1	0
1985–86	Washington Capitals	NHL	71	34	39	73	72	9	4	6	10	11
1986–87	Washington Capitals	NHL	50	25	16	41	43	6	0	3	3	7
1987–88	Quebec Nordiques	NHL	72	23	34	57	112	—	—	—	—	—
1988–89	SC Bern	NLA	36	23	30	53	63	11	8	2	10	28
1989–90	SC Bern	NLA	36	31	30	61	79	11	7	6	13	31
1990–91	SC Bern	NLA	30	27	15	42	109	5	2	6	8	2
1991–92	SC Bern	NLA	31	14	22	36	97	10	7	6	13	14
1991–92	Canadian National Team	Intl	1	0	0	0	0	—	—	—	—	—
NHL totals			524	189	211	400	425	42	12	16	28	28
