= Brad Palmer =

Canadian ice hockey player (born 1961)

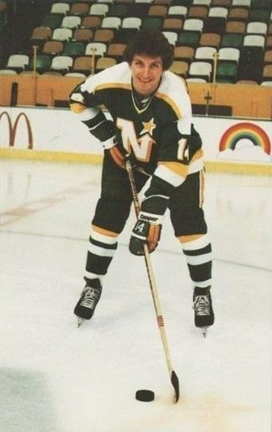
- Born: September 14, 1961 (age 64) Duncan, British Columbia, Canada
- Height: 6 ft 0 in (183 cm)
- Weight: 185 lb (84 kg; 13 st 3 lb)
- Position: Left wing
- Shot: Left
- Played for: Minnesota North Stars; Boston Bruins; EHC Chur; Lukko; EHC Lustenau; BSC Preussen
- NHL draft: 16th overall, 1980; Minnesota North Stars
- Playing career: 1980–1992

Brad Donald Palmer (born September 14, 1961) is a Canadian former professional ice hockey player. He played in the National Hockey League (NHL) with the Minnesota North Stars and Boston Bruins between 1980 and 1983, and then spent several seasons in Europe before retiring in 1992.

== Biography ==
Palmer was born in Duncan, British Columbia and raised in Lake Cowichan, British Columbia. As a youth, he played in the 1974 Quebec International Pee-Wee Hockey Tournament with a minor ice hockey team from Lake Cowichan. He was selected by the Minnesota North Stars with the 16th pick in the 1980 NHL entry draft. He played two seasons with the North Stars and then played one year with the Boston Bruins.

His son, Jack Palmer, played in the Western Hockey League with the Brandon Wheat Kings and the Victoria Royals.

== Career statistics ==
=== Regular season and playoffs ===
| | | | Regular season | | | | | Playoffs |
| Season | Team | League | GP | G | A | Pts | PIM | GP | G | A | Pts | PIM |
|---|---|---|---|---|---|---|---|---|---|---|---|---|
| 1977–78 | Kelowna Buckaroos | BCHL | 46 | 20 | 21 | 41 | 32 | — | — | — | — | — |
| 1978–79 | Victoria Cougars | WHL | 69 | 18 | 15 | 33 | 53 | 15 | 2 | 7 | 9 | 2 |
| 1979–80 | Victoria Cougars | WHL | 72 | 45 | 49 | 94 | 61 | 17 | 11 | 8 | 19 | 6 |
| 1980–81 | Victoria Cougars | WHL | 44 | 34 | 53 | 87 | 72 | — | — | — | — | — |
| 1980–81 | Minnesota North Stars | NHL | 23 | 4 | 4 | 8 | 22 | 19 | 8 | 5 | 13 | 4 |
| 1981–82 | Minnesota North Stars | NHL | 72 | 22 | 23 | 45 | 18 | 3 | 0 | 0 | 0 | 12 |
| 1982–83 | Boston Bruins | NHL | 73 | 6 | 11 | 17 | 18 | 7 | 1 | 0 | 1 | 0 |
| 1983–84 | Hershey Bears | AHL | 62 | 25 | 32 | 57 | 16 | — | — | — | — | — |
| 1984–85 | EHC Chur | NDA | 10 | 4 | 3 | 7 | — | — | — | — | — | — |
| 1985–86 | Lukko | SM-l | 31 | 16 | 8 | 24 | 10 | — | — | — | — | — |
| 1986–87 | Lukko | SM-l | 22 | 5 | 6 | 11 | 16 | — | — | — | — | — |
| 1988–89 | EHC Lustenau | AUT | 32 | 26 | 24 | 50 | — | — | — | — | — | — |
| 1989–90 | EHC Lustenau | AUT | 16 | 8 | 5 | 13 | 4 | — | — | — | — | — |
| 1991–92 | EC Bad Nauheim | GER-2 | 14 | 5 | 12 | 17 | 28 | — | — | — | — | — |
| 1991–92 | BSC Preussen | GER | 6 | 2 | 0 | 2 | 4 | — | — | — | — | — |
| NHL totals | | | 168 | 32 | 38 | 70 | 58 | 29 | 9 | 5 | 14 | 16 |

| Preceded by Tom McCarthy | Minnesota North Stars first-round draft pick 1980 | Succeeded by Ron Meighan |
