= George Ferguson (ice hockey) =

Canadian ice hockey player (1952–2019)

- Born: August 22, 1952 Trenton, Ontario, Canada
- Died: December 15, 2019 (aged 67)
- Height: 6 ft 0 in (183 cm)
- Weight: 195 lb (88 kg; 13 st 13 lb)
- Position: Centre
- Shot: Right
- Played for: Toronto Maple Leafs; Pittsburgh Penguins; Minnesota North Stars
- National team: Canada
- NHL draft: 11th overall, 1972; Toronto Maple Leafs
- Playing career: 1972–1984

George Stephen Ferguson (August 22, 1952 – December 15, 2019) was a Canadian professional ice hockey centre who played 797 career NHL games.

== Career ==
He was selected in the first round of the 1972 NHL Amateur Draft from the Toronto Marlboros. He later played for the Toronto Maple Leafs, Pittsburgh Penguins and Minnesota North Stars. Ferguson coached the Trenton Sting, a junior A level hockey team based in his hometown of Trenton, Ontario.

== Personal life ==
Ferguson died in 2019 at the age of 67.

== Career statistics ==
| | | | Regular Season | | | | | Playoffs |
| Season | Team | League | GP | G | A | Pts | PIM | GP | G | A | Pts | PIM |
|---|---|---|---|---|---|---|---|---|---|---|---|---|
| 1969–70 | Oshawa Generals | OHA | 49 | 19 | 21 | 40 | 20 | — | — | — | — | — |
| 1970–71 | Toronto Marlboros | OHA | 53 | 12 | 15 | 27 | 83 | — | — | — | — | — |
| 1971–72 | Toronto Marlboros | OHA | 62 | 36 | 56 | 92 | 104 | — | — | — | — | — |
| 1972–73 | Toronto Maple Leafs | NHL | 72 | 10 | 13 | 23 | 34 | — | — | — | — | — |
| 1973–74 | Toronto Maple Leafs | NHL | 16 | 0 | 4 | 4 | 4 | 3 | 0 | 1 | 1 | 2 |
| 1973–74 | Oklahoma City Blazers | CHL | 35 | 16 | 33 | 49 | 21 | — | — | — | — | — |
| 1974–75 | Toronto Maple Leafs | NHL | 69 | 19 | 30 | 49 | 61 | 7 | 1 | 0 | 1 | 7 |
| 1975–76 | Toronto Maple Leafs | NHL | 79 | 12 | 32 | 44 | 76 | 10 | 2 | 4 | 6 | 2 |
| 1976–77 | Toronto Maple Leafs | NHL | 50 | 9 | 15 | 24 | 24 | 9 | 0 | 3 | 3 | 7 |
| 1977–78 | Toronto Maple Leafs | NHL | 73 | 7 | 16 | 23 | 37 | 13 | 5 | 1 | 6 | 7 |
| 1978–79 | Pittsburgh Penguins | NHL | 80 | 21 | 29 | 50 | 37 | 7 | 2 | 1 | 3 | 0 |
| 1979–80 | Pittsburgh Penguins | NHL | 73 | 21 | 28 | 49 | 36 | 5 | 0 | 3 | 3 | 4 |
| 1980–81 | Pittsburgh Penguins | NHL | 79 | 25 | 18 | 43 | 42 | 5 | 2 | 6 | 8 | 9 |
| 1981–82 | Pittsburgh Penguins | NHL | 71 | 22 | 31 | 53 | 45 | 5 | 0 | 1 | 1 | 0 |
| 1982–83 | Pittsburgh Penguins | NHL | 7 | 0 | 0 | 0 | 2 | — | — | — | — | — |
| 1982–83 | Minnesota North Stars | NHL | 65 | 8 | 12 | 20 | 14 | 9 | 0 | 3 | 3 | 4 |
| 1983–84 | Minnesota North Stars | NHL | 63 | 6 | 10 | 16 | 19 | 13 | 2 | 0 | 2 | 2 |
| NHL totals | | | 797 | 160 | 238 | 398 | 431 | 86 | 14 | 23 | 37 | 44 |

| Preceded by Darryl Sittler | Toronto Maple Leafs first-round draft pick 1972 | Succeeded by Lanny McDonald |
