= 1980–81 Winnipeg Jets season =

NHL hockey team season

1980–81 Winnipeg Jets
- Division: 5th Smythe
- Conference: 11th Campbell
- 1980–81 record: 9–57–14
- Home record: 7–25–8
- Road record: 2–32–6
- Goals for: 246
- Goals against: 400

Team information
- General manager: John Ferguson
- Coach: Tom McVie
- Captain: Morris Lukowich
- Alternate captains: None
- Arena: Winnipeg Arena

Team leaders
- Goals: Morris Lukowich (33)
- Assists: Dave Christian (43)
- Points: Dave Christian (71)
- Penalty minutes: Jimmy Mann (105)
- Wins: Michel Dion; Pierre Hamel; Markus Mattsson (3)
- Goals against average: Markus Mattsson (4.52)

The 1980–81 Winnipeg Jets season was the Winnipeg Jets' second season in the National Hockey League (NHL). In the 1980–81 season they finished fifth (and last) in the NHL's Smythe Division. The team scored 246 goals and conceded 400 goals. The Jets won 9 games, lost 57 games and tied 14 games. They scored 32 points. The team also endured an NHL-record 30-game winless streak (23 losses and 7 ties) which included the entire month of November and most of December.

The Jets were coached by Tom McVie (1 win, 20 losses and 7 ties), Bill Sutherland (6 wins, 20 losses and 3 ties), and Mike Smith (2 wins, 17 losses and 4 ties).

== Offseason ==
The Jets named Morris Lukowich as team captain during the off-season, as former captain Lars-Erik Sjoberg announced his retirement at the end of the 1979–80 season. Lukowich had been with Winnipeg since their final season in the WHA, helping the club win the Avco Cup in 1979.

On June 11, 1980, Winnipeg selected defenseman Dave Babych with the second overall pick in the 1980 NHL entry draft. Babych was a high scoring defenseman with the Portland Winterhawks of the WHL, recording 22 goals and 82 points in 50 games with Portland. With their second pick, the Jets selected Moe Mantha from the Toronto Marlboros of the OMJHL, and in the seventh round, the team selected Brian Mullen from the United States national ice hockey team.

Winnipeg made a few small trades during the off-season, most notably acquiring Rick Bowness from the St. Louis Blues in exchange for Craig Norwich. The Jets also acquired Norm Dupont from the Montreal Canadiens for the Jets second round pick in the 1982 NHL entry draft. Dupont was selected by the Canadiens in the first round of the 1977 NHL amateur draft, however, he picked up only a goal and four points in 35 games with Montreal in the 1979–80 season.

== Regular season ==
For the second straight season, the Jets failed to qualify for the playoffs, as they had an NHL worst record of 9–57–14, earning 32 points, 39 points behind the Toronto Maple Leafs for the final playoff position.

=== Final standings ===
Smythe Division
	GP	W	L	T	GF	GA	Pts
**St. Louis Blues**	80	45	18	17	352	281	107
**Chicago Black Hawks**	80	31	33	16	304	315	78
**Vancouver Canucks**	80	28	32	20	289	301	76
**Edmonton Oilers**	80	29	35	16	328	327	74
Colorado Rockies	80	22	45	13	258	344	57
Winnipeg Jets	80	9	57	14	246	400	32

Note: GP = Games played, W = Wins, L = Losses, T = Ties, Pts = Points, GF = Goals for, GA = Goals against
Note: Teams that qualified for the playoffs are highlighted in bold.

League standings
R		Div	GP	W	L	T	GF	GA	Pts
1	**p – New York Islanders**	PTK	80	48	18	14	355	260	110
2	**x – St. Louis Blues**	SMY	80	45	18	17	352	281	107
3	**y – Montreal Canadiens**	NRS	80	45	22	13	332	232	103
4	**Los Angeles Kings**	NRS	80	43	24	13	337	290	99
5	**x – Buffalo Sabres**	ADM	80	39	20	21	327	250	99
6	**Philadelphia Flyers**	PTK	80	41	24	15	313	249	97
7	**Calgary Flames**	PTK	80	39	27	14	329	298	92
8	**Boston Bruins**	ADM	80	37	30	13	316	272	87
9	**Minnesota North Stars**	ADM	80	35	28	17	291	263	87
10	**Chicago Black Hawks**	SMY	80	31	33	16	304	315	78
11	**Quebec Nordiques**	ADM	80	30	32	18	314	318	78
12	**Vancouver Canucks**	SMY	80	28	32	20	289	301	76
13	**New York Rangers**	PTK	80	30	36	14	312	317	74
14	**Edmonton Oilers**	SMY	80	29	35	16	328	327	74
15	**Pittsburgh Penguins**	NRS	80	30	37	13	302	345	73
16	**Toronto Maple Leafs**	ADM	80	28	37	15	322	367	71
17	Washington Capitals	PTK	80	26	36	18	286	317	70
18	Hartford Whalers	NRS	80	21	41	18	292	372	60
19	Colorado Rockies	SMY	80	22	45	13	258	344	57
20	Detroit Red Wings	NRS	80	19	43	18	252	339	56
21	Winnipeg Jets	SMY	80	9	57	14	246	400	32

Divisions: ADM – Adams, NRS – Norris, PTK – Patrick, SMY – Smythe

bold – The top 16 teams in the league qualified for the playoffs, regardless of division or conference.
x – Won division; y – Won Conference (and division); p – Won Presidents' Trophy (and conference and division)

=== Record vs. opponents ===
Smythe Division record vs. opponents

==== Vs. Campbell Conference ====
**Vs. Smythe Division**

1980–81 NHL records
Team	**CHI**	**COL**	**EDM**	**STL**	**VAN**	**WIN**	**Total**
Chicago	—	2−2	1−3	1−2−1	2−2	3−1	9−10−1
Colorado	2−2	—	3−0−1	1−3	0−2−2	1−2−1	7−9−4
Edmonton	3−1	0−3−1	—	1−2−1	2−2	4−0	10−8−2
St. Louis	2−1−1	3−1	2−1−1	—	4−0	2−0−2	13−3−4
Vancouver	2−2	2−0−2	2−2	0−4	—	2−0−2	8−8−4
Winnipeg	1−3	2−1−1	0−4	0−2−2	0−2−2	—	3−12−5

**Vs. Patrick Division**

1980–81 NHL records
Team	**CGY**	**NYI**	**NYR**	**PHI**	**WSH**	**Total**
Chicago	1−0−3	0−4	1−2−1	1−1−2	1−1−2	4−8−8
Colorado	3−1	1−3	3−1	0−4	0−3−1	7−12−1
Edmonton	1−2−1	0−2−2	1−2−1	2−2	1−2−1	5−10−5
St. Louis	2−2	0−2−2	4−0	0−3−1	2−0−2	8−7−5
Vancouver	1−3	1−3	1−2−1	2−1−1	1−1−2	6−10−4
Winnipeg	0−3−1	0−3−1	1−3	1−3	0−3−1	2−15−3

**Vs. Wales Conference**

**Vs. Adams Division**

1980–81 NHL records
Team	**BOS**	**BUF**	**MIN**	**QUE**	**TOR**	**Total**
Chicago	1−3	2−2	2−2	3−0−1	1−2−1	9−9−2
Colorado	1−2−1	0−3−1	1−2−1	2−2	1−1−2	5−10−5
Edmonton	1−3	1−1−2	1−2−1	1−3	2−1−1	6−10−4
St. Louis	3−1	3−0−1	1−2−1	2−1−1	3−1	12−5−3
Vancouver	2−2	1−1−2	1−2−1	1−1−2	3−0−1	8−6−6
Winnipeg	0−2−2	0−4	0−4	1−1−2	2−2	3−13−4

**Vs. Norris Division**

1980–81 NHL records
Team	**DET**	**HFD**	**LAK**	**MTL**	**PIT**	**Total**
Chicago	1−1−2	3−0−1	0−2−2	2−2	3−1	9−6−5
Colorado	1−2−1	1−2−1	0−3−1	0−4	1−3	3−14−3
Edmonton	2−1−1	2−1−1	0−2−2	2−2	2−1−1	8−7−5
St. Louis	4−0	3−0−1	2−0−2	1−1−2	2−2	12−3−5
Vancouver	2−1−1	1−1−2	0−4	0−2−2	3−0−1	6−8−6
Winnipeg	0−3−1	0−3−1	0−4	1−3	0−4	1−17−2

== Schedule and results ==
1980–81 regular season
October

Game	Result	Date	Score	Opponent	Record	Attendance
1	L	October 10, 1980	1–4	@ Washington Capitals (1980–81)	0–1–0	12,984
2	L	October 11, 1980	4–5	@ Pittsburgh Penguins (1980–81)	0–2–0	9,240
3	W	October 17, 1980	6–2	Chicago Black Hawks (1980–81)	1–2–0	12,236
4	T	October 19, 1980	4–4	Quebec Nordiques (1980–81)	1–2–1	12,728
5	L	October 22, 1980	4–7	@ Buffalo Sabres (1980–81)	1–3–1	16,433
6	L	October 25, 1980	1–4	@ Minnesota North Stars (1980–81)	1–4–1	15,383
7	T	October 26, 1980	7–7	Boston Bruins (1980–81)	1–4–2	15,198
8	L	October 29, 1980	4–8	@ Chicago Black Hawks (1980–81)	1–5–2	8,136
9	L	October 31, 1980	5–6	Pittsburgh Penguins (1980–81)	1–6–2	11,536

November

Game	Result	Date	Score	Opponent	Record	Attendance
10	T	November 2, 1980	4–4	Washington Capitals (1980–81)	1–6–3	12,095
11	T	November 5, 1980	5–5	Calgary Flames (1980–81)	1–6–4	10,500
12	L	November 7, 1980	2–4	Edmonton Oilers (1980–81)	1–7–4	12,744
13	L	November 9, 1980	4–7	Toronto Maple Leafs (1980–81)	1–8–4	15,743
14	L	November 12, 1980	1–5	@ Quebec Nordiques (1980–81)	1–9–4	N/A
15	T	November 13, 1980	5–5	@ Boston Bruins (1980–81)	1–9–5	8,089
16	L	November 16, 1980	1–5	Montreal Canadiens (1980–81)	1–10–5	15,744
17	L	November 18, 1980	1–6	@ Vancouver Canucks (1980–81)	1–11–5	12,176
18	L	November 19, 1980	2–7	@ Los Angeles Kings (1980–81)	1–12–5	7,572
19	L	November 21, 1980	2–4	Buffalo Sabres (1980–81)	1–13–5	12,837
20	L	November 23, 1980	1–3	@ Philadelphia Flyers (1980–81)	1–14–5	17,077
21	T	November 25, 1980	4–4	@ New York Islanders (1980–81)	1–14–6	14,087
22	L	November 26, 1980	4–8	@ Hartford Whalers (1980–81)	1–15–6	10,741
23	T	November 28, 1980	1–1	St. Louis Blues (1980–81)	1–15–7	11,200
24	L	November 30, 1980	1–4	Calgary Flames (1980–81)	1–16–7	12,867

December

Game	Result	Date	Score	Opponent	Record	Attendance
25	L	December 3, 1980	3–4	New York Rangers (1980–81)	1–17–7	13,380
26	L	December 4, 1980	1–3	@ Calgary Flames (1980–81)	1–18–7	7,077
27	L	December 6, 1980	2–5	@ St. Louis Blues (1980–81)	1–19–7	14,546
28	L	December 10, 1980	5–8	Hartford Whalers (1980–81)	1–20–7	11,623
29	L	December 13, 1980	3–4	@ Minnesota North Stars (1980–81)	1–21–7	12,371
30	L	December 14, 1980	4–5	New York Islanders (1980–81)	1–22–7	14,549
31	L	December 16, 1980	2–6	@ New York Islanders (1980–81)	1–23–7	14,106
32	L	December 17, 1980	2–8	@ New York Rangers (1980–81)	1–24–7	17,361
33	L	December 20, 1980	2–5	@ St. Louis Blues (1980–81)	1–25–7	11,115
34	W	December 23, 1980	5–4	Colorado Rockies (1980–81)	2–25–7	11,587
35	L	December 26, 1980	3–5	Minnesota North Stars (1980–81)	2–26–7	15,776
36	L	December 28, 1980	3–4	Detroit Red Wings (1980–81)	2–27–7	14,040
37	L	December 31, 1980	3–5	Washington Capitals (1980–81)	2–28–7	14,167

January

Game	Result	Date	Score	Opponent	Record	Attendance
38	W	January 2, 1981	4–3	Philadelphia Flyers (1980–81)	3–28–7	15,481
39	L	January 5, 1981	1–4	Boston Bruins (1980–81)	3–29–7	13,405
40	W	January 7, 1981	8–2	@ Toronto Maple Leafs (1980–81)	4–29–7	16,485
41	T	January 9, 1981	4–4	Vancouver Canucks (1980–81)	4–29–8	13,239
42	L	January 10, 1981	3–5	Hartford Whalers (1980–81)	4–30–8	11,233
43	T	January 13, 1981	3–3	@ Quebec Nordiques (1980–81)	4–30–9	9,425
44	L	January 15, 1981	3–7	@ Montreal Canadiens (1980–81)	4–31–9	15,386
45	L	January 17, 1981	2–4	@ Calgary Flames (1980–81)	4–32–9	7,243
46	L	January 18, 1981	4–5	Toronto Maple Leafs (1980–81)	4–33–9	15,286
47	W	January 21, 1981	5–1	New York Rangers (1980–81)	5–33–9	12,010
48	T	January 23, 1981	2–2	@ Colorado Rockies (1980–81)	5–33–10	8,048
49	L	January 27, 1981	3–4	@ Washington Capitals (1980–81)	5–34–10	7,440
50	L	January 29, 1981	6–7	@ Boston Bruins (1980–81)	5–35–10	8,023
51	W	January 31, 1981	2–0	@ Toronto Maple Leafs (1980–81)	6–35–10	16,485

February

Game	Result	Date	Score	Opponent	Record	Attendance
52	L	February 1, 1981	0–4	@ Buffalo Sabres (1980–81)	6–36–10	16,370
53	L	February 4, 1981	2–3	Pittsburgh Penguins (1980–81)	6–37–10	11,968
54	L	February 6, 1981	4–10	@ Edmonton Oilers (1980–81)	6–38–10	17,455
55	L	February 8, 1981	1–9	@ Chicago Black Hawks (1980–81)	6–39–10	12,329
56	L	February 12, 1981	6–8	@ New York Rangers (1980–81)	6–40–10	17,343
57	W	February 15, 1981	4–3	Quebec Nordiques (1980–81)	7–40–10	13,352
58	L	February 17, 1981	4–6	@ Detroit Red Wings (1980–81)	7–41–10	10,235
59	T	February 18, 1981	3–3	@ Hartford Whalers (1980–81)	7–41–11	14,096
60	L	February 20, 1981	3–5	Minnesota North Stars (1980–81)	7–42–11	13,498
61	L	February 21, 1981	1–5	Edmonton Oilers (1980–81)	7–43–11	14,873
62	L	February 25, 1981	3–4	@ Pittsburgh Penguins (1980–81)	7–44–11	6,655
63	L	February 27, 1981	3–6	Philadelphia Flyers (1980–81)	7–45–11	14,302

March

Game	Result	Date	Score	Opponent	Record	Attendance
64	T	March 1, 1981	4–4	Detroit Red Wings (1980–81)	7–45–12	12,815
65	L	March 4, 1981	3–9	@ Montreal Canadiens (1980–81)	7–46–12	16,790
66	L	March 5, 1981	1–10	@ Philadelphia Flyers (1980–81)	7–47–12	17,077
67	W	March 7, 1981	4–2	Montreal Canadiens (1980–81)	8–47–12	15,648
68	L	March 8, 1981	1–4	Los Angeles Kings (1980–81)	8–48–12	13,992
69	L	March 11, 1981	3–6	New York Islanders (1980–81)	8–49–12	12,035
70	L	March 13, 1981	2–5	Buffalo Sabres (1980–81)	8–50–12	12,936
71	L	March 15, 1981	2–8	Chicago Black Hawks (1980–81)	8–51–12	11,913
72	W	March 18, 1981	4–3	Colorado Rockies (1980–81)	9–51–12	10,936
73	L	March 21, 1981	4–5	@ Detroit Red Wings (1980–81)	9–52–12	12,232
74	L	March 22, 1981	5–7	Los Angeles Kings (1980–81)	9–53–12	12,849
75	L	March 27, 1981	2–10	Vancouver Canucks (1980–81)	9–54–12	14,022
76	L	March 29, 1981	1–2	@ Colorado Rockies (1980–81)	9–55–12	7,875
77	L	March 31, 1981	3–7	@ Los Angeles Kings (1980–81)	9–56–12	9,748

April

Game	Result	Date	Score	Opponent	Record	Attendance
78	T	April 1, 1981	4–4	@ Vancouver Canucks (1980–81)	9–56–13	12,209
79	L	April 4, 1981	2–7	@ Edmonton Oilers (1980–81)	9–57–13	17,490
80	T	April 5, 1981	5–5	St. Louis Blues (1980–81)	9–57–14	14,173

Legend: Win (2 points) Loss (0 points) Tie (1 point)

== Player statistics ==
=== Regular season ===
Scoring

Player	Pos	GP	G	A	Pts	PIM	+/-	PPG	SHG	GWG
Dave Christian	RW	80	28	43	71	22	-54	9	1	0
Morris Lukowich	LW	80	33	34	67	90	-39	9	2	2
Norm Dupont	LW	80	27	26	53	8	-57	8	0	1
Ron Wilson	C	77	18	33	51	55	-34	4	1	0
Danny Geoffrion	RW	78	20	26	46	82	-32	3	0	0
Dave Babych	D	69	6	38	44	90	-61	3	0	0
Willy Lindstrom	RW	72	22	13	35	45	-28	7	0	1
Tim Trimper	LW	56	15	14	29	28	-31	1	0	1
Rick Bowness	RW	45	8	17	25	45	-35	0	0	1
Moe Mantha	D	58	2	23	25	35	-33	1	0	0
Doug Lecuyer	LW	45	6	17	23	66	-27	0	0	1
Barry Long	D	65	6	17	23	42	-47	0	0	0
Peter Sullivan	C	47	4	19	23	20	-17	2	0	0
Kris Manery	C/RW	47	13	9	22	24	-15	4	1	0
Don Spring	D	80	1	18	19	18	-40	0	0	0
Doug Smail	LW	30	10	8	18	45	-7	1	3	1
Anders Steen	C	42	5	11	16	22	-22	3	0	1
Peter Marsh	RW	24	6	7	13	9	-17	3	0	0
Rick Dudley	LW	30	5	5	10	28	-12	0	0	0
Jimmy Mann	RW	37	3	3	6	105	-18	0	0	0
Mark Plantery	D	25	1	5	6	14	-10	0	0	0
Barry Legge	D	38	0	6	6	69	-33	0	0	0
Scott Campbell	D	14	1	4	5	55	3	0	0	0
Tom Bladon	D	9	0	5	5	10	-10	0	0	0
John Markell	LW	14	1	3	4	15	-11	1	0	0
Richard Mulhern	D	19	0	4	4	14	-9	0	0	0
Al Cameron	D	29	1	2	3	21	-19	0	0	0
Murray Eaves	C	12	1	2	3	5	-7	1	0	0
Barry Melrose	D	18	1	1	2	40	-12	0	0	0
Sandy Beadle	LW	6	1	0	1	2	-2	0	0	0
Dave Hoyda	LW	9	1	0	1	7	0	0	0	0
Ross Cory	D	5	0	1	1	9	-8	0	0	0
Pierre Hamel	G	29	0	1	1	4	0	0	0	0
Markus Mattsson	G	31	0	1	1	2	0	0	0	0
Dave Chartier	C	1	0	0	0	0	0	0	0	0
Pat Daley	LW	7	0	0	0	9	-3	0	0	0
Michel Dion	G	14	0	0	0	2	0	0	0	0
Jude Drouin	C	7	0	0	0	4	-2	0	0	0
Ron Loustel	G	1	0	0	0	0	0	0	0	0
Lindsay Middlebrook	G	14	0	0	0	0	0	0	0	0
Bill Whelton	D	2	0	0	0	0	-1	0	0	0

Goaltending

Player	MIN	GP	W	L	T	GA	GAA	SO
Michel Dion	757	14	3	6	3	61	4.83	0
Pierre Hamel	1623	29	3	20	4	128	4.73	0
Markus Mattsson	1707	31	3	21	4	128	4.50	1
Ron Loustel	60	1	0	1	0	10	10.00	0
Lindsay Middlebrook	653	14	0	9	3	65	5.97	0
Team:	4800	80	9	57	14	392	4.90	1

Note:

Pos = Position;GP = Games played; G = Goals; A = Assists; Pts = Points; PIM = Penalty minutes; +/- = Plus/minus; PPG = Power-play goals; SHG = Short-handed goals; GWG = Game-winning goals
Pos = Position;GP = Games played; Min, TOI = Minutes played; W = Wins; L = Losses; T,T/OT = Ties; OTL = Overtime losses; GA = Goals-against; GAA = Goals-against average; SO = Shutouts; SA = Shots against; SV = Shots saved;SV% = Save percentage;

== Transactions ==
=== Trades ===
June 19, 1980	To St. Louis Blues Craig Norwich	To Winnipeg Jets Rick Bowness
August 6, 1980	To New York Rangers Gord Smith	To Winnipeg Jets Cash
September 26, 1980	To Montreal Canadiens 2nd round pick in 1982 – David Maley	To Winnipeg Jets Norm Dupont
October 8, 1980	To Quebec Nordiques Cash	To Winnipeg Jets Danny Geoffrion
October 31, 1980	To Detroit Red Wings Cash	To Winnipeg Jets Barry Long
December 1, 1980	To Chicago Black Hawks Peter Marsh	To Winnipeg Jets Tim Trimper; Doug Lecuyer
December 2, 1980	To Toronto Maple Leafs Cash	To Winnipeg Jets Richard Mulhern
February 10, 1981	To Quebec Nordiques Cash	To Winnipeg Jets Michel Dion

=== Waivers ===
January 12, 1981	From Buffalo Sabres Rick Dudley

=== Free agents ===
Player	Former team
Don Spring	Undrafted Free Agent
Tom Bladon	Edmonton Oilers

Player	New team
Tom Bladon	Detroit Red Wings

== Draft picks ==
Winnipeg selected the following players at the 1980 NHL entry draft, which was held at the Montreal Forum in Montreal on June 11, 1980.

=== NHL amateur draft ===
Round	Pick	Player	Nationality	College/Junior/Club team
1	2	Dave Babych (D)	Canada	Portland Winterhawks (WHL)
2	23	Moe Mantha (D)	Canada	Toronto Marlboros (OHA)
3	44	Murray Eaves (C)	Canada	University of Michigan (NCAA)
4	65	Guy Fournier (F)	Canada	Shawinigan Cataractes (QMJHL)
5	86	Glen Ostir (D)	Canada	Portland Winterhawks (WHL)
6	107	Ron Loustel (G)	Canada	Saskatoon Blades (WHL)
7	128	Brian Mullen (LW)	United States	US National Under-18 Team
7	135	Michel Lauen (RW)	United States	Michigan Tech (NCAA)
8	149	Sandy Beadle (LW)	Canada	Northeastern University (NCAA)
9	170	Ed Christian (F)	United States	Warroad (MN) High School
10	191	Dave Chartier (C)	Canada	Brandon Wheat Kings (WHL)

== See also ==
- 1980–81 NHL season
