= 1980–81 Los Angeles Kings season =

National Hockey League team season

1980–81 Los Angeles Kings
- Division: 2nd Norris
- Conference: 2nd Wales
- 1980–81 record: 43–24–13
- Home record: 22–11–7
- Road record: 21–13–6
- Goals for: 337
- Goals against: 290

Team information
- General manager: George Maguire
- Coach: Bob Berry
- Captain: Mike Murphy
- Alternate captains: None
- Arena: The Forum
- Average attendance: 11,219

Team leaders
- Goals: Marcel Dionne (58)
- Assists: Marcel Dionne (77)
- Points: Marcel Dionne (135)
- Penalty minutes: Jay Wells (155)
- Plus/minus: Marcel Dionne (54)
- Wins: Mario Lessard (35)
- Goals against average: Mario Lessard (3.26)

The 1980–81 Los Angeles Kings season, was the Kings' 14th season in the National Hockey League (NHL). It saw the Kings make it to the playoffs, losing in the preliminary round to the New York Rangers.

== Regular season ==
=== Final standings ===
Norris Division
	GP	W	L	T	GF	GA	Pts
**Montreal Canadiens**	80	45	22	13	332	232	103
**Los Angeles Kings**	80	43	24	13	337	290	99
**Pittsburgh Penguins**	80	30	37	13	302	345	73
Hartford Whalers	80	21	41	18	292	372	60
Detroit Red Wings	80	19	43	18	252	339	56

Note: GP = Games played, W = Wins, L = Losses, T = Ties, Pts = Points, GF = Goals for, GA = Goals against
Note: Teams that qualified for the playoffs are highlighted in bold.

League standings
R		Div	GP	W	L	T	GF	GA	Pts
1	**p – New York Islanders**	PTK	80	48	18	14	355	260	110
2	**x – St. Louis Blues**	SMY	80	45	18	17	352	281	107
3	**y – Montreal Canadiens**	NRS	80	45	22	13	332	232	103
4	**Los Angeles Kings**	NRS	80	43	24	13	337	290	99
5	**x – Buffalo Sabres**	ADM	80	39	20	21	327	250	99
6	**Philadelphia Flyers**	PTK	80	41	24	15	313	249	97
7	**Calgary Flames**	PTK	80	39	27	14	329	298	92
8	**Boston Bruins**	ADM	80	37	30	13	316	272	87
9	**Minnesota North Stars**	ADM	80	35	28	17	291	263	87
10	**Chicago Black Hawks**	SMY	80	31	33	16	304	315	78
11	**Quebec Nordiques**	ADM	80	30	32	18	314	318	78
12	**Vancouver Canucks**	SMY	80	28	32	20	289	301	76
13	**New York Rangers**	PTK	80	30	36	14	312	317	74
14	**Edmonton Oilers**	SMY	80	29	35	16	328	327	74
15	**Pittsburgh Penguins**	NRS	80	30	37	13	302	345	73
16	**Toronto Maple Leafs**	ADM	80	28	37	15	322	367	71
17	Washington Capitals	PTK	80	26	36	18	286	317	70
18	Hartford Whalers	NRS	80	21	41	18	292	372	60
19	Colorado Rockies	SMY	80	22	45	13	258	344	57
20	Detroit Red Wings	NRS	80	19	43	18	252	339	56
21	Winnipeg Jets	SMY	80	9	57	14	246	400	32

Divisions: ADM – Adams, NRS – Norris, PTK – Patrick, SMY – Smythe

bold – The top 16 teams in the league qualified for the playoffs, regardless of division or conference.
x – Won division; y – Won Conference (and division); p – Won Presidents' Trophy (and conference and division)

=== Record vs. opponents ===
Norris Division record vs. opponents

==== Vs. Wales Conference ====
**Vs. Norris Division**

1980–81 NHL records
Team	**DET**	**HFD**	**LAK**	**MTL**	**PIT**	**Total**
Detroit	—	0−2−2	1−3	1−3	1−2−1	**3−10−3**
Hartford	2−0−2	—	0−3−1	1−3	2−2	**5−8−3**
Los Angeles	3−1	3−0−1	—	1−3	0−2−2	**7−6−3**
Montreal	3−1	3−1	3−1	—	2−2	**11−5−0**
Pittsburgh	2−1−1	2−2	2−0−2	2−2	—	**8−5−3**

**Vs. Adams Division**

1980–81 NHL records
Team	**BOS**	**BUF**	**MIN**	**QUE**	**TOR**	**Total**
Detroit	0−2−2	0−3−1	0−2−2	0−3−1	3−1	**3−11−6**
Hartford	1−1−2	1−2−1	1−3	2−2	1−1−2	**6−9−5**
Los Angeles	2−2	1−2−1	4−0	3−1	3−0−1	**13−5−2**
Montreal	3−1	3−1	1−2−1	1−1−2	3−1	**11−6−3**
Pittsburgh	0−3−1	0−3−1	1−3	2−1−1	1−2−1	**4−12−4**

==== Vs. Campbell Conference ====
**Vs. Patrick Division**

1980–81 NHL records
Team	**CGY**	**NYI**	**NYR**	**PHI**	**WSH**	**Total**
Detroit	1−2−1	0−4	2−1−1	1−3	1−2−1	**5−12−3**
Hartford	1−3	0−2−2	1−3	0−3−1	1−3	**3−14−3**
Los Angeles	1−3	2−2	3−1	0−4	2−1−1	**8−11−1**
Montreal	2−1−1	1−2−1	2−1−1	2−1−1	2−0−2	**9−5−6**
Pittsburgh	1−2−1	2−1−1	2−1−1	0−4	2−1−1	**7−9−4**

**Vs. Smythe Division**

1980–81 NHL records
Team	**CHI**	**COL**	**EDM**	**STL**	**VAN**	**WIN**	**Total**
Detroit	1−1−2	2−1−1	1−2−1	0−4	1−2−1	3−0−1	**8−10−6**
Hartford	0−3−1	2−1−1	1−2−1	0−3−1	1−1−2	3−0−1	**7−10−7**
Los Angeles	2−0−2	3−0−1	2−0−2	0−2−2	4−0	4−0	**15−2−7**
Montreal	2−2	4−0	2−2	1−1−2	2−0−2	3−1	**14−6−4**
Pittsburgh	1−3	3−1	1−2−1	2−2	0−3−1	4−0	**11−11−2**

== Schedule and results ==
1980–81 regular season
October

Game	Result	Date	Score	Opponent	Record
1	W	October 11, 1980	8–1	Detroit Red Wings (1980–81)	1–0–0
2	L	October 14, 1980	2–4	@ Calgary Flames (1980–81)	1–1–0
3	W	October 16, 1980	6–4	Quebec Nordiques (1980–81)	2–1–0
4	W	October 18, 1980	4–3	Colorado Rockies (1980–81)	3–1–0
5	W	October 22, 1980	4–0	Boston Bruins (1980–81)	4–1–0
6	W	October 25, 1980	5–4	Toronto Maple Leafs (1980–81)	5–1–0
7	T	October 26, 1980	4–4	@ Edmonton Oilers (1980–81)	5–1–1
8	W	October 28, 1980	8–4	@ Colorado Rockies (1980–81)	6–1–1
9	W	October 29, 1980	4–2	Washington Capitals (1980–81)	7–1–1

November

Game	Result	Date	Score	Opponent	Record
10	W	November 1, 1980	7–3	@ New York Islanders (1980–81)	8–1–1
11	W	November 2, 1980	6–3	@ New York Rangers (1980–81)	9–1–1
12	W	November 5, 1980	5–3	@ Washington Capitals (1980–81)	10–1–1
13	L	November 6, 1980	2–8	@ Philadelphia Flyers (1980–81)	10–2–1
14	L	November 8, 1980	0–3	@ Montreal Canadiens (1980–81)	10–3–1
15	W	November 10, 1980	4–1	New York Rangers (1980–81)	11–3–1
16	L	November 12, 1980	4–8	Montreal Canadiens (1980–81)	11–4–1
17	L	November 15, 1980	3–5	St. Louis Blues (1980–81)	11–5–1
18	W	November 16, 1980	3–2	@ Vancouver Canucks (1980–81)	12–5–1
19	W	November 19, 1980	7–2	Winnipeg Jets (1980–81)	13–5–1
20	W	November 22, 1980	5–2	@ Toronto Maple Leafs (1980–81)	14–5–1
21	W	November 24, 1980	4–3	@ Quebec Nordiques (1980–81)	15–5–1
22	L	November 26, 1980	2–4	Philadelphia Flyers (1980–81)	15–6–1
23	W	November 29, 1980	5–2	Chicago Black Hawks (1980–81)	16–6–1

December

Game	Result	Date	Score	Opponent	Record
24	W	December 2, 1980	5–2	Hartford Whalers (1980–81)	17–6–1
25	W	December 4, 1980	3–1	Vancouver Canucks (1980–81)	18–6–1
26	W	December 6, 1980	5–3	New York Islanders (1980–81)	19–6–1
27	L	December 8, 1980	2–4	Calgary Flames (1980–81)	19–7–1
28	W	December 10, 1980	7–2	@ Minnesota North Stars (1980–81)	20–7–1
29	W	December 11, 1980	2–1	@ Detroit Red Wings (1980–81)	21–7–1
30	T	December 13, 1980	5–5	@ Hartford Whalers (1980–81)	21–7–2
31	L	December 14, 1980	1–7	@ Boston Bruins (1980–81)	21–8–2
32	T	December 17, 1980	3–3	Pittsburgh Penguins (1980–81)	21–8–3
33	L	December 20, 1980	4–7	Buffalo Sabres (1980–81)	21–9–3
34	W	December 23, 1980	7–4	Edmonton Oilers (1980–81)	22–9–3
35	W	December 26, 1980	6–3	@ Vancouver Canucks (1980–81)	23–9–3
36	T	December 27, 1980	4–4	St. Louis Blues (1980–81)	23–9–4
37	L	December 30, 1980	0–4	@ Montreal Canadiens (1980–81)	23–10–4
38	W	December 31, 1980	5–2	@ Buffalo Sabres (1980–81)	24–10–4

January

Game	Result	Date	Score	Opponent	Record
39	L	January 2, 1981	6–7	@ Calgary Flames (1980–81)	24–11–4
40	W	January 5, 1981	5–2	Calgary Flames (1980–81)	25–11–4
41	W	January 7, 1981	5–3	Hartford Whalers (1980–81)	26–11–4
42	T	January 10, 1981	6–6	@ St. Louis Blues (1980–81)	26–11–5
43	T	January 11, 1981	4–4	@ Buffalo Sabres (1980–81)	26–11–6
44	W	January 14, 1981	5–4	@ Hartford Whalers (1980–81)	27–11–6
45	L	January 15, 1981	0–3	@ Washington Capitals (1980–81)	27–12–6
46	L	January 17, 1981	4–5	@ Pittsburgh Penguins (1980–81)	27–13–6
47	L	January 18, 1981	2–7	@ Philadelphia Flyers (1980–81)	27–14–6
48	W	January 20, 1981	11–4	Detroit Red Wings (1980–81)	28–14–6
49	T	January 22, 1981	3–3	Toronto Maple Leafs (1980–81)	28–14–7
50	W	January 24, 1981	6–4	@ Boston Bruins (1980–81)	29–14–7
51	W	January 26, 1981	7–5	@ Quebec Nordiques (1980–81)	30–14–7
52	L	January 28, 1981	2–6	New York Rangers (1980–81)	30–15–7
53	W	January 31, 1981	4–1	Montreal Canadiens (1980–81)	31–15–7

February

Game	Result	Date	Score	Opponent	Record
54	W	February 2, 1981	3–2	@ New York Rangers (1980–81)	32–15–7
55	L	February 3, 1981	1–8	@ New York Islanders (1980–81)	32–16–7
56	L	February 5, 1981	4–6	@ Detroit Red Wings (1980–81)	32–17–7
57	T	February 7, 1981	4–4	Washington Capitals (1980–81)	32–17–8
58	T	February 12, 1981	5–5	@ Chicago Black Hawks (1980–81)	32–17–9
59	L	February 14, 1981	4–5	Boston Bruins (1980–81)	32–18–9
60	L	February 18, 1981	2–4	Quebec Nordiques (1980–81)	32–19–9
61	L	February 21, 1981	1–3	Philadelphia Flyers (1980–81)	32–20–9
62	W	February 24, 1981	5–2	Edmonton Oilers (1980–81)	33–20–9
63	W	February 26, 1981	4–3	Vancouver Canucks (1980–81)	34–20–9
64	L	February 28, 1981	1–2	New York Islanders (1980–81)	34–21–9

March

Game	Result	Date	Score	Opponent	Record
65	W	March 2, 1981	1–0	@ Toronto Maple Leafs (1980–81)	35–21–9
66	L	March 4, 1981	5–6	@ Pittsburgh Penguins (1980–81)	35–22–9
67	W	March 6, 1981	3–1	@ Colorado Rockies (1980–81)	36–22–9
68	W	March 8, 1981	4–1	@ Winnipeg Jets (1980–81)	37–22–9
69	T	March 11, 1981	4–4	Chicago Black Hawks (1980–81)	37–22–10
70	W	March 14, 1981	10–4	Minnesota North Stars (1980–81)	38–22–10
71	L	March 17, 1981	1–3	Buffalo Sabres (1980–81)	38–23–10
72	T	March 19, 1981	4–4	Pittsburgh Penguins (1980–81)	38–23–11
73	T	March 21, 1981	6–6	@ Edmonton Oilers (1980–81)	38–23–12
74	W	March 22, 1981	7–5	@ Winnipeg Jets (1980–81)	39–23–12
75	W	March 24, 1981	4–3	@ Minnesota North Stars (1980–81)	40–23–12
76	W	March 25, 1981	4–2	@ Chicago Black Hawks (1980–81)	41–23–12
77	W	March 28, 1981	3–2	Minnesota North Stars (1980–81)	42–23–12
78	W	March 31, 1981	7–3	Winnipeg Jets (1980–81)	43–23–12

April

Game	Result	Date	Score	Opponent	Record
79	L	April 2, 1981	4–6	@ St. Louis Blues (1980–81)	43–24–12
80	T	April 4, 1981	5–5	Colorado Rockies (1980–81)	43–24–13

Legend: Win (2 points) Loss (0 points) Tie (1 point)

== Player statistics ==
Regular season
Scoring

Player	Pos	GP	G	A	Pts	PIM	+/-	PPG	SHG	GWG
Marcel Dionne	C	80	58	77	135	70	55	23	4	9
Dave Taylor	RW	72	47	65	112	130	47	13	0	3
Charlie Simmer	LW	65	56	49	105	62	31	23	0	9
Larry Murphy	D	80	16	60	76	79	17	5	1	1
Jerry Korab	D	78	9	43	52	139	10	3	0	2
Billy Harris	RW	80	20	29	49	36	-1	1	4	1
Jim Fox	RW	71	18	25	43	8	0	2	0	2
Mike Murphy	RW	68	16	23	39	54	-7	2	1	1
Steve Jensen	LW	74	19	19	38	88	-6	5	1	4
Greg Terrion	LW	73	12	25	37	99	-1	2	0	2
Dan Bonar	C	71	11	15	26	57	0	3	1	3
Dean Hopkins	RW	67	8	18	26	118	6	2	0	1
Mark Hardy	D	77	5	20	25	77	14	3	0	1
Garry Unger	C	58	10	10	20	40	-17	1	0	0
Doug Halward	D	51	4	15	19	96	-2	1	0	0
Jay Wells	D	72	5	13	18	155	9	0	0	1
Andre St. Laurent	C	22	10	6	16	63	8	0	0	2
Glenn Goldup	RW	49	6	9	15	35	-2	0	0	0
Dave Lewis	D	67	1	12	13	98	25	0	0	0
John Paul Kelly	LW	19	3	6	9	8	4	0	0	0
Rick Chartraw	D/RW	21	1	6	7	28	1	0	0	1
Robert Palmer	D	13	0	4	4	13	5	0	0	0
Rick Martin	LW	1	1	1	2	0	1	0	0	0
Don Luce	C	10	1	0	1	2	-4	0	0	0
Mario Lessard	G	64	0	1	1	8	0	0	0	0
Jim Rutherford	G	3	0	1	1	0	0	0	0	0
John Gibson	D	4	0	0	0	21	-5	0	0	0
Ron Grahame	G	6	0	0	0	0	0	0	0	0
Doug Keans	G	9	0	0	0	7	0	0	0	0
Dave Morrison	RW	3	0	0	0	0	-1	0	0	0
Paul Pageau	G	1	0	0	0	0	0	0	0	0
Kevin Schamehorn	RW	5	0	0	0	4	-1	0	0	0
Don Waddell	D	1	0	0	0	0	-1	0	0	0

Goaltending

Player	MIN	GP	W	L	T	GA	GAA	SO
Mario Lessard	3746	64	35	18	11	203	3.25	2
Ron Grahame	360	6	3	2	1	28	4.67	0
Jim Rutherford	180	3	3	0	0	10	3.33	0
Doug Keans	454	9	2	3	1	37	4.89	0
Paul Pageau	60	1	0	1	0	8	8.00	0
Team:	4800	80	43	24	13	286	3.57	2

Playoffs
Scoring

Player	Pos	GP	G	A	Pts	PIM	PPG	SHG	GWG
Dave Taylor	RW	4	2	2	4	10	1	0	0
Marcel Dionne	C	4	1	3	4	7	1	0	0
Larry Murphy	D	4	3	0	3	2	1	0	0
Billy Harris	RW	4	2	1	3	0	0	0	0
Mark Hardy	D	4	1	2	3	4	1	0	0
Dan Bonar	C	4	1	1	2	11	0	1	0
Steve Jensen	LW	4	0	2	2	7	0	0	0
Dave Lewis	D	4	0	2	2	4	0	0	0
Don Luce	C	4	0	2	2	2	0	0	0
Dean Hopkins	RW	4	1	0	1	9	0	0	1
Greg Terrion	LW	3	1	0	1	4	1	0	0
Rick Chartraw	D/RW	4	0	1	1	4	0	0	0
Jim Fox	RW	4	0	1	1	0	0	0	0
John Paul Kelly	LW	4	0	1	1	25	0	0	0
Mike Murphy	RW	1	0	1	1	0	0	0	0
Andre St. Laurent	C	3	0	1	1	9	0	0	0
Jerry Korab	D	4	0	0	0	33	0	0	0
Mario Lessard	G	4	0	0	0	0	0	0	0
Rick Martin	LW	1	0	0	0	0	0	0	0
Jim Rutherford	G	1	0	0	0	0	0	0	0
Jay Wells	D	4	0	0	0	27	0	0	0

Goaltending

Player	MIN	GP	W	L	GA	GAA	SO
Mario Lessard	220	4	1	3	20	5.45	0
Jim Rutherford	20	1	0	0	2	6.00	0
Team:	240	4	1	3	22	5.50	0

Note:

Pos = Position;GP = Games played; G = Goals; A = Assists; Pts = Points; PIM = Penalty minutes; +/- = Plus/minus; PPG = Power-play goals; SHG = Short-handed goals; GWG = Game-winning goals
Pos = Position;GP = Games played; Min, TOI = Minutes played; W = Wins; L = Losses; T,T/OT = Ties; OTL = Overtime losses; GA = Goals-against; GAA = Goals-against average; SO = Shutouts; SA = Shots against; SV = Shots saved;SV% = Save percentage;

== Transactions ==
The Kings were involved in the following transactions during the 1980–81 season.

=== Trades ===
June 6, 1980	To Los Angeles Kings Garry Unger	To Calgary Flames Bert Wilson; Randy Holt
December 12, 1980	To Los Angeles Kings Cash	To Quebec Nordiques Ron Grahame
February 17, 1981	To Los Angeles Kings Rick Chartraw	To Montreal Canadiens 3rd round pick in 1983 – Claude Lemieux
March 8, 1981	To Los Angeles Kings 5th round pick in 1982 – Ulf Isaksson; Future considerations	To Vancouver Canucks Doug Halward
March 10, 1981	To Los Angeles Kings 7th round pick in 1981 – Craig Hurley	To Edmonton Oilers Garry Unger
March 10, 1981	To Los Angeles Kings Don Luce	To Buffalo Sabres 6th round pick in 1982 – Jeff Parker
March 10, 1981	To Los Angeles Kings Jim Rutherford	To Toronto Maple Leafs 5th round pick in 1981 – Barry Brigley
March 10, 1981	To Los Angeles Kings Rick Martin	To Buffalo Sabres 3rd round pick in 1981 – Colin Chisholm; 1st round pick in 1983 – Tom Barrasso

=== Free agent signings ===
May 6, 1980	From Team Canada Paul Pageau
August 1, 1980	From Edmonton Oilers Alec Tidey
August 1, 1980	From Vancouver Canucks Larry Goodenough
September 15, 1980	From Oklahoma City Stars (CHL) Cal Sandbeck
September 15, 1980	From Colorado Rockies Nelson Pyatt
October 18, 1980	From Detroit Red Wings Kevin Schamehorn

== Draft picks ==
Los Angeles's draft picks at the 1980 NHL entry draft held at the Montreal Forum in Montreal.

Round	#	Player	Nationality	College/Junior/Club team (League)
1	4	Larry Murphy	Canada	Peterborough Petes (OHA)
1	10	Jim Fox	Canada	Ottawa 67's (OHA)
2	33	Greg Terrion	Canada	Brantford Alexanders (OHA)
2	34	Dave Morrison	Canada	Peterborough Petes (OHA)
3	52	Steve Bozek	Canada	Northern Michigan University (NCAA)
4	73	Bernie Nicholls	Canada	Kingston Canadians (OMJHL)
5	94	Alan Graves	Canada	Seattle Breakers (WHL)
6	115	Darren Eliot	Canada	Cornell University (ECAC)
7	136	Mike O'Connor	Canada	Michigan Tech University (WCHA)
8	157	Billy O'Dwyer	United States	Boston College (ECAC)
9	178	Daryl Evans	Canada	Niagara Falls Flyers (OMJHL)
10	199	Kim Collins	Canada	Bowling Green University (CCHA)

== See also ==
- 1980–81 NHL season
