= 1980–81 Minnesota North Stars season =

National Hockey League team season

1980–81 Minnesota North Stars
- Division: 3rd Adams
- Conference: 5th Wales
- 1980–81 record: 35–28–17
- Home record: 23–10–7
- Road record: 12–18–10
- Goals for: 291
- Goals against: 263

Team information
- General manager: Lou Nanne
- Coach: Glen Sonmor
- Captain: Paul Shmyr
- Alternate captains: None
- Arena: Met Center
- Average attendance: 14,175

Team leaders
- Goals: Steve Payne (30)
- Assists: Bobby Smith (64)
- Points: Bobby Smith (93)
- Penalty minutes: Greg Smith (126)
- Plus/minus: Steve Payne (+14)
- Wins: Don Beaupre (18)
- Goals against average: Don Beaupre (3.20)

The 1980–81 Minnesota North Stars season was the North Stars' 14th season. Although the North Stars finished the season with one less win and one less point than the previous season, they made a surprise appearance in the Stanley Cup Finals against the New York Islanders, which they lost 4 games to 1.

== Offseason ==
=== NHL draft ===
Round	Pick	Player	Nationality	College/junior/club team
1	16	Brad Palmer (F)	Canada	Victoria Cougars (WHL)
2	37	Don Beaupre (G)	Canada	Sudbury Wolves (OHA)
4	79	Mark Huglen (D)	United States	Roseau High School (USHS-MN)
5	100	David Jensen (D)	United States	University of Minnesota (WCHA)
6	121	Danny Zavarise (D)	Canada	Cornwall Royals (QMJHL)
7	142	Bill Stewart (RW)	Canada	University of Denver (WCHA)
8	163	Jeff Walters (RW)	Canada	Peterborough Petes (OMJHL)
9	184	Bob Lakso (LW)	United States	Aurora-Hoyt Lakes High School (USHS-MN)
10	205	Dave Richter (D)	Canada	University of Michigan (WCHA)

== Regular season ==
=== Season standings ===
Adams Division
	GP	W	L	T	GF	GA	Pts
**Buffalo Sabres**	80	39	20	21	327	250	99
**Boston Bruins**	80	37	30	13	316	272	87
**Minnesota North Stars**	80	35	28	17	291	263	87
**Quebec Nordiques**	80	30	32	18	314	318	78
**Toronto Maple Leafs**	80	28	37	15	322	367	71

Note: GP = Games played, W = Wins, L = Losses, T = Ties, Pts = Points, GF = Goals for, GA = Goals against
Note: Teams that qualified for the playoffs are highlighted in bold.

League standings
R		Div	GP	W	L	T	GF	GA	Pts
1	**p – New York Islanders**	PTK	80	48	18	14	355	260	110
2	**x – St. Louis Blues**	SMY	80	45	18	17	352	281	107
3	**y – Montreal Canadiens**	NRS	80	45	22	13	332	232	103
4	**Los Angeles Kings**	NRS	80	43	24	13	337	290	99
5	**x – Buffalo Sabres**	ADM	80	39	20	21	327	250	99
6	**Philadelphia Flyers**	PTK	80	41	24	15	313	249	97
7	**Calgary Flames**	PTK	80	39	27	14	329	298	92
8	**Boston Bruins**	ADM	80	37	30	13	316	272	87
9	**Minnesota North Stars**	ADM	80	35	28	17	291	263	87
10	**Chicago Black Hawks**	SMY	80	31	33	16	304	315	78
11	**Quebec Nordiques**	ADM	80	30	32	18	314	318	78
12	**Vancouver Canucks**	SMY	80	28	32	20	289	301	76
13	**New York Rangers**	PTK	80	30	36	14	312	317	74
14	**Edmonton Oilers**	SMY	80	29	35	16	328	327	74
15	**Pittsburgh Penguins**	NRS	80	30	37	13	302	345	73
16	**Toronto Maple Leafs**	ADM	80	28	37	15	322	367	71
17	Washington Capitals	PTK	80	26	36	18	286	317	70
18	Hartford Whalers	NRS	80	21	41	18	292	372	60
19	Colorado Rockies	SMY	80	22	45	13	258	344	57
20	Detroit Red Wings	NRS	80	19	43	18	252	339	56
21	Winnipeg Jets	SMY	80	9	57	14	246	400	32

Divisions: ADM – Adams, NRS – Norris, PTK – Patrick, SMY – Smythe

bold – The top 16 teams in the league qualified for the playoffs, regardless of division or conference.
x – Won division; y – Won Conference (and division); p – Won Presidents' Trophy (and conference and division)

=== Record vs. opponents ===
Adams Division record vs. opponents

==== Vs. Wales Conference ====
**Vs. Adams Division**

1980–81 NHL records
Team	**BOS**	**BUF**	**MIN**	**QUE**	**TOR**	**Total**
Boston	—	2–1–1	2–1–1	1–3	1–1–2	**6–6–4**
Buffalo	1–2–1	—	0–1–3	3–0–1	3–1	**7–4–5**
Minnesota	1–2–1	1–0–3	—	2–2	0–4	**4–8–4**
Quebec	3–1	0–3–1	2–2	—	0–2–2	**5–8–3**
Toronto	1–1–2	1–3	4–0	2–0–2	—	**8–4–4**

**Vs. Norris Division**

1980–81 NHL records
Team	**DET**	**HFD**	**LAK**	**MTL**	**PIT**	**Total**
Boston	2−0−2	1−1−2	2−2	1−3	3−0−1	**9–6–5**
Buffalo	3−0−1	2−1−1	2−1−1	1−3	3−0−1	**11–5–4**
Minnesota	2−0−2	3−1	0−4	2−1−1	3−1	**10–7–3**
Quebec	3−0−1	2−2	1−3	1−1−2	1−2–1	**8–8–4**
Toronto	1−3	1–1−2	0−3−1	1−3	2−1–1	**5–11–4**

==== Vs. Campbell Conference ====
**Vs. Patrick Division**

1980–81 NHL records
Team	**CGY**	**NYI**	**NYR**	**PHI**	**WSH**	**Total**
Boston	1–3	2–2	2–2	2–2	2–1–1	**9–10–1**
Buffalo	2–1–1	2–2	2–1–1	2–0–2	2–0–2	**10–4–6**
Minnesota	2–2	0–2–2	1–1–2	1–2–1	3–0–1	**7–7–6**
Quebec	1–1–2	1–3	1–1–2	2–1–1	4–0	**9–6–5**
Toronto	2–2	1–3	2–2	2–0–2	1–3	**8–10–2**

**Vs. Smythe Division**

1980–81 NHL records
Team	**CHI**	**COL**	**EDM**	**STL**	**VAN**	**WIN**	**Total**
Boston	3−1	2−1−1	3−1	1−3	2−2	2−0−2	**13−8−3**
Buffalo	2−2	3–0−1	1−1−2	0−3−1	1−1−2	4−0	**11−7−6**
Minnesota	2−2	2−1–1	2−1−1	2−1–1	2−1−1	4−0	**14−6−4**
Quebec	0−3−1	2−2	3−1	1−2–1	1–1−2	1–1−2	**8−10−6**
Toronto	2−1–1	1−1−2	1−2−1	1−3	0–3−1	2−2	**7−12−5**

== Schedule and results ==
1980–81 regular season
October

Game	Result	Date	Score	Opponent	Record
1	W	October 11, 1980	9–3	Hartford Whalers (1980–81)	1–0–0
2	W	October 15, 1980	3–2	Boston Bruins (1980–81)	2–0–0
3	T	October 17, 1980	5–5	@ Colorado Rockies (1980–81)	2–0–1
4	L	October 18, 1980	2–6	@ Calgary Flames (1980–81)	2–1–1
5	W	October 22, 1980	4–2	Quebec Nordiques (1980–81)	3–1–1
6	W	October 24, 1980	4–2	@ Edmonton Oilers (1980–81)	4–1–1
7	W	October 25, 1980	4–1	Winnipeg Jets (1980–81)	5–1–1
8	T	October 29, 1980	2–2	St. Louis Blues (1980–81)	5–1–2

November

Game	Result	Date	Score	Opponent	Record
9	W	November 1, 1980	6–3	Pittsburgh Penguins (1980–81)	6–1–2
10	W	November 2, 1980	8–3	Calgary Flames (1980–81)	7–1–2
11	L	November 7, 1980	2–3	@ Vancouver Canucks (1980–81)	7–2–2
12	W	November 9, 1980	7–1	@ Chicago Black Hawks (1980–81)	8–2–2
13	T	November 11, 1980	6–6	@ New York Islanders (1980–81)	8–2–3
14	W	November 12, 1980	5–1	@ Hartford Whalers (1980–81)	9–2–3
15	W	November 15, 1980	5–2	Chicago Black Hawks (1980–81)	10–2–3
16	L	November 17, 1980	1–2	New York Islanders (1980–81)	10–3–3
17	W	November 19, 1980	3–2	@ Pittsburgh Penguins (1980–81)	11–3–3
18	T	November 20, 1980	1–1	@ Philadelphia Flyers (1980–81)	11–3–4
19	L	November 22, 1980	2–6	Chicago Black Hawks (1980–81)	11–4–4
20	L	November 26, 1980	2–5	@ Quebec Nordiques (1980–81)	11–5–4
21	W	November 29, 1980	4–2	@ Montreal Canadiens (1980–81)	12–5–4

December

Game	Result	Date	Score	Opponent	Record
22	W	December 1, 1980	5–3	@ New York Rangers (1980–81)	13–5–4
23	T	December 3, 1980	3–3	@ Washington Capitals (1980–81)	13–5–5
24	T	December 6, 1980	3–3	Buffalo Sabres (1980–81)	13–5–6
25	T	December 7, 1980	1–1	Detroit Red Wings (1980–81)	13–5–7
26	L	December 9, 1980	1–4	@ St. Louis Blues (1980–81)	13–6–7
27	L	December 10, 1980	2–7	Los Angeles Kings (1980–81)	13–7–7
28	W	December 13, 1980	4–3	Winnipeg Jets (1980–81)	14–7–7
29	L	December 15, 1980	3–6	Toronto Maple Leafs (1980–81)	14–8–7
30	L	December 17, 1980	2–4	@ Toronto Maple Leafs (1980–81)	14–9–7
31	T	December 20, 1980	3–3	New York Rangers (1980–81)	14–9–8
32	W	December 23, 1980	6–2	@ Detroit Red Wings (1980–81)	15–9–8
33	W	December 26, 1980	5–3	@ Winnipeg Jets (1980–81)	16–9–8
34	W	December 27, 1980	6–4	Colorado Rockies (1980–81)	17–9–8
35	W	December 30, 1980	6–5	Philadelphia Flyers (1980–81)	18–9–8

January

Game	Result	Date	Score	Opponent	Record
36	W	January 3, 1981	3–0	Washington Capitals (1980–81)	19–9–8
37	T	January 4, 1981	2–2	@ Buffalo Sabres (1980–81)	19–9–9
38	T	January 7, 1981	1–1	Vancouver Canucks (1980–81)	19–9–10
39	L	January 9, 1981	2–4	@ Colorado Rockies (1980–81)	19–10–10
40	W	January 10, 1981	3–2	Washington Capitals (1980–81)	20–10–10
41	L	January 12, 1981	3–4	@ Boston Bruins (1980–81)	20–11–10
42	T	January 14, 1981	1–1	@ Buffalo Sabres (1980–81)	20–11–11
43	W	January 17, 1981	7–1	Quebec Nordiques (1980–81)	21–11–11
44	W	January 19, 1981	6–3	Montreal Canadiens (1980–81)	22–11–11
45	W	January 21, 1981	2–1	@ Washington Capitals (1980–81)	23–11–11
46	L	January 22, 1981	4–5	@ Philadelphia Flyers (1980–81)	23–12–11
47	W	January 24, 1981	6–1	Edmonton Oilers (1980–81)	24–12–11
48	W	January 26, 1981	3–2	Calgary Flames (1980–81)	25–12–11
49	L	January 28, 1981	1–3	@ Pittsburgh Penguins (1980–81)	25–13–11
50	T	January 29, 1981	3–3	@ Detroit Red Wings (1980–81)	25–13–12
51	L	January 31, 1981	3–7	New York Rangers (1980–81)	25–14–12

February

Game	Result	Date	Score	Opponent	Record
52	L	February 4, 1981	2–6	@ Quebec Nordiques (1980–81)	25–15–12
53	L	February 5, 1981	0–7	@ Montreal Canadiens (1980–81)	25–16–12
54	T	February 7, 1981	5–5	@ New York Islanders (1980–81)	25–16–13
55	T	February 8, 1981	3–3	@ New York Rangers (1980–81)	25–16–14
56	L	February 12, 1981	3–4	Toronto Maple Leafs (1980–81)	25–17–14
57	W	February 14, 1981	7–4	Hartford Whalers (1980–81)	26–17–14
58	W	February 15, 1981	7–2	Vancouver Canucks (1980–81)	27–17–14
59	W	February 18, 1981	6–2	Colorado Rockies (1980–81)	28–17–14
60	W	February 20, 1981	5–3	@ Winnipeg Jets (1980–81)	29–17–14
61	L	February 21, 1981	3–5	@ Toronto Maple Leafs (1980–81)	29–18–14
62	L	February 23, 1981	1–4	New York Islanders (1980–81)	29–19–14
63	L	February 25, 1981	2–3	@ Hartford Whalers (1980–81)	29–20–14
64	L	February 26, 1981	1–5	@ Boston Bruins (1980–81)	29–21–14
65	L	February 28, 1981	2–4	Philadelphia Flyers (1980–81)	29–22–14

March

Game	Result	Date	Score	Opponent	Record
66	T	March 4, 1981	3–3	Boston Bruins (1980–81)	29–22–15
67	W	March 7, 1981	8–5	Pittsburgh Penguins (1980–81)	30–22–15
68	T	March 9, 1981	1–1	Montreal Canadiens (1980–81)	30–22–16
69	W	March 11, 1981	3–1	Buffalo Sabres (1980–81)	31–22–16
70	L	March 12, 1981	3–6	@ Calgary Flames (1980–81)	31–23–16
71	L	March 14, 1981	4–10	@ Los Angeles Kings (1980–81)	31–24–16
72	L	March 18, 1981	3–5	Edmonton Oilers (1980–81)	31–25–16
73	T	March 20, 1981	1–1	@ Edmonton Oilers (1980–81)	31–25–17
74	W	March 22, 1981	9–3	Detroit Red Wings (1980–81)	32–25–17
75	L	March 24, 1981	3–4	Los Angeles Kings (1980–81)	32–26–17
76	L	March 28, 1981	2–3	@ Los Angeles Kings (1980–81)	32–27–17
77	W	March 29, 1981	4–2	@ Vancouver Canucks (1980–81)	33–27–17
78	W	March 31, 1981	6–3	St. Louis Blues (1980–81)	34–27–17

April

Game	Result	Date	Score	Opponent	Record
79	W	April 4, 1981	5–0	@ St. Louis Blues (1980–81)	35–27–17
80	L	April 5, 1981	4–8	@ Chicago Black Hawks (1980–81)	35–28–17

Legend: Win (2 points) Loss (0 points) Tie (1 point)

== Playoffs ==
1981 Stanley Cup playoffs
Preliminary round vs. (8) Boston Bruins – North Stars win 3–0

Game	Date	Visitor	Score	Home	Series
1	April 8	Minnesota North Stars	5–4 (OT)	Boston Bruins	1-0
2	April 9	Minnesota North Stars	9–6	Boston Bruins	2-0
3	April 11	Boston Bruins	3–6	Minnesota North Stars	3-0

Quarterfinals vs. (3) Buffalo Sabres – North Stars win 4–1

Game	Date	Visitor	Score	Home	Series
1	April 16	Minnesota North Stars	4–3 (OT)	Buffalo Sabres	1-0
2	April 17	Minnesota North Stars	5–2	Buffalo Sabres	2-0
3	April 19	Buffalo Sabres	4–6	Minnesota North Stars	3-0
4	April 20	Buffalo Sabres	5–4 (OT)	Minnesota North Stars	3-1
5	April 22	Minnesota North Stars	4–3	Buffalo Sabres	4-1

Semifinals vs. (2) Calgary Flames – North Stars win 4–2

Game	Date	Visitor	Score	Home	Series
1	April 28	Minnesota North Stars	4–1	Calgary Flames	1-0
2	April 30	Minnesota North Stars	2–3	Calgary Flames	1-1
3	May 3	Calgary Flames	4–6	Minnesota North Stars	2-1
4	May 5	Calgary Flames	4–7	Minnesota North Stars	3-1
5	May 7	Minnesota North Stars	1–3	Calgary Flames	3-2
6	May 9	Calgary Flames	3–5	Minnesota North Stars	4-2

Stanley Cup Finals vs. (1) New York Islanders – Islanders win 4–1

Game	Date	Visitor	Score	Home	Series
1	May 12	Minnesota North Stars	3–6	New York Islanders	0-1
2	May 14	Minnesota North Stars	3–6	New York Islanders	0-2
3	May 17	New York Islanders	7–5	Minnesota North Stars	0-3
4	May 19	New York Islanders	2–4	Minnesota North Stars	1-3
5	May 21	Minnesota North Stars	1–5	New York Islanders	1-4

Legend: Win Loss

== Player statistics ==
=== Skaters ===
Note: GP = Games played; G = Goals; A = Assists; Pts = Points; PIM = Penalty minutes

Player	GP	G	A	Pts	+/-	PIM
Bobby Smith	78	29	64	93	+1	73
Tim Young	74	25	41	66	+6	40
Al MacAdam	78	21	39	60	-6	94
Steve Payne	76	30	28	58	+14	88
Tom McCarthy	62	23	25	48	+3	62
Craig Hartsburg	74	13	30	43	-9	124
Kent-Erik Andersson	77	17	24	41	+8	22
Steve Christoff	56	26	13	39	-9	58
Gordie Roberts	50	6	31	37	+2	94
Mike Eaves	48	10	24	34	+1	18
Dino Ciccarelli	32	18	12	30	+2	29
Curt Giles	67	5	22	27	+8	56
Greg Smith	74	5	21	26	+7	126
Glen Sharpley	28	12	12	24	-4	18
Mike Fidler	20	5	12	17	+5	6
Ron Zanussi	41	6	11	17	+3	89
Brad Maxwell	27	3	13	16	-1	98
Mike Polich	74	8	5	13	-3	19
Fred Barrett	62	4	8	12	E	72
Gary Sargent	23	4	7	11	-1	36
Tom Younghans	74	4	6	10	-10	79
Paul Shmyr	61	1	9	10	+4	79
Jack Carlson	43	7	2	9	-5	108
Brad Palmer	23	4	4	8	-5	22
Kevin Maxwell	6	0	3	3	-1	7
Don Jackson	10	0	3	3	+3	19

=== Goaltending ===
Note: GP = Games played; W = Wins; L = Losses; T = Ties; SO = Shutouts; GAA = Goals against average

Player	GP	W	L	T	SO	GAA
Don Beaupre	44	18	14	11	0	3.21
Gilles Meloche	38	17	14	6	2	3.26

== Transactions ==
The North Stars were involved in the following transactions during the 1980–81 season.

=== Trades ===
June 6, 1980	To Minnesota North Stars Alex Pirus	To Detroit Red Wings Cash
July 4, 1980	To Minnesota North Stars Future considerations	To New York Islanders Alex Pirus
September 1, 1980	To Minnesota North Stars Bill Nyrop	To Montreal Canadiens Future considerations
December 16, 1980	To Minnesota North Stars Gordie Roberts	To Hartford Whalers Mike Fidler
December 29, 1980	To Minnesota North Stars Ken Solheim; 2nd round pick in 1981 – Tom Hirsch	To Chicago Black Hawks Glen Sharpley
February 2, 1981	To Minnesota North Stars 3rd round pick in 1982 – Wally Chapman	To Edmonton Oilers Gary Edwards
March 10, 1981	To Minnesota North Stars 2nd round pick in 1981 – Dave Donnelly	To Toronto Maple Leafs Ron Zanussi; 3rd round pick in 1981 – Ernie Godden
June 9, 1981	To Minnesota North Stars Nelson Burton	To Quebec Nordiques Dan Chicoine

=== Waivers ===
June 8, 1980	To Detroit Red Wings David Hanson

=== Free agent signings ===
June 16, 1980	From Erie Blades (EHL) Dan Poulin
June 26, 1980	From Baltimore Clippers (EHL) Ron Friest
August 7, 1980	From Billings Bighorns (WHL) Murray Brumwell
March 23, 1981	From Väsby IK (Sweden) Roger Melin
