= 1980–81 Montreal Canadiens season =

NHL hockey team season

1980–81 Montreal Canadiens
- Wales Conference champions
- Norris Division champions
- Division: 1st Norris
- Conference: 1st Wales
- 1980–81 record: 45–22–13
- Home record: 31–7–2
- Road record: 14–15–11
- Goals for: 332
- Goals against: 232

Team information
- General manager: Irving Grundman
- Coach: Claude Ruel
- Captain: Serge Savard
- Alternate captains: None
- Arena: Montreal Forum
- Average attendance: 16,699

Team leaders
- Goals: Steve Shutt; Mark Napier (35)
- Assists: Guy Lafleur (43)
- Points: Steve Shutt (73)
- Penalty minutes: Chris Nilan (262)
- Plus/minus: Brian Engblom (+63)
- Wins: Richard Sevigny (20)
- Goals against average: Rick Wamsley (1.90)

The 1980–81 Montreal Canadiens season was the National Hockey League (NHL)'s Montreal Canadiens' 72nd season of play. The Canadiens lost just once in their last twenty-seven home games. The Canadiens earned at least 100 regular season points for the seventh consecutive season. Montreal qualified for the 1981 Stanley Cup playoffs and were eliminated in the NHL's preliminary round by the Edmonton Oilers three games to none, in what was considered a major upset. Four days after the Canadiens were eliminated, head coach Claude Ruel resigned.

== Regular season ==
- Guy Lafleur, as a result of recovery from a car accident, appeared in only 51 games and scored 27 goals. It was the first time since the 1973–74 season that he failed to score 50 goals or more in a season.

=== Final standings ===
Norris Division
	GP	W	L	T	GF	GA	Pts
**Montreal Canadiens**	80	45	22	13	332	232	103
**Los Angeles Kings**	80	43	24	13	337	290	99
**Pittsburgh Penguins**	80	30	37	13	302	345	73
Hartford Whalers	80	21	41	18	292	372	60
Detroit Red Wings	80	19	43	18	252	339	56

Note: GP = Games played, W = Wins, L = Losses, T = Ties, Pts = Points, GF = Goals for, GA = Goals against
Note: Teams that qualified for the playoffs are highlighted in bold.

League standings
R		Div	GP	W	L	T	GF	GA	Pts
1	**p – New York Islanders**	PTK	80	48	18	14	355	260	110
2	**x – St. Louis Blues**	SMY	80	45	18	17	352	281	107
3	**y – Montreal Canadiens**	NRS	80	45	22	13	332	232	103
4	**Los Angeles Kings**	NRS	80	43	24	13	337	290	99
5	**x – Buffalo Sabres**	ADM	80	39	20	21	327	250	99
6	**Philadelphia Flyers**	PTK	80	41	24	15	313	249	97
7	**Calgary Flames**	PTK	80	39	27	14	329	298	92
8	**Boston Bruins**	ADM	80	37	30	13	316	272	87
9	**Minnesota North Stars**	ADM	80	35	28	17	291	263	87
10	**Chicago Black Hawks**	SMY	80	31	33	16	304	315	78
11	**Quebec Nordiques**	ADM	80	30	32	18	314	318	78
12	**Vancouver Canucks**	SMY	80	28	32	20	289	301	76
13	**New York Rangers**	PTK	80	30	36	14	312	317	74
14	**Edmonton Oilers**	SMY	80	29	35	16	328	327	74
15	**Pittsburgh Penguins**	NRS	80	30	37	13	302	345	73
16	**Toronto Maple Leafs**	ADM	80	28	37	15	322	367	71
17	Washington Capitals	PTK	80	26	36	18	286	317	70
18	Hartford Whalers	NRS	80	21	41	18	292	372	60
19	Colorado Rockies	SMY	80	22	45	13	258	344	57
20	Detroit Red Wings	NRS	80	19	43	18	252	339	56
21	Winnipeg Jets	SMY	80	9	57	14	246	400	32

Divisions: ADM – Adams, NRS – Norris, PTK – Patrick, SMY – Smythe

bold – The top 16 teams in the league qualified for the playoffs, regardless of division or conference.
x – Won division; y – Won Conference (and division); p – Won Presidents' Trophy (and conference and division)

=== Record vs. opponents ===
Norris Division record vs. opponents

==== Vs. Wales Conference ====
**Vs. Norris Division**

1980–81 NHL records
Team	**DET**	**HFD**	**LAK**	**MTL**	**PIT**	**Total**
Detroit	—	0−2−2	1−3	1−3	1−2−1	**3−10−3**
Hartford	2−0−2	—	0−3−1	1−3	2−2	**5−8−3**
Los Angeles	3−1	3−0−1	—	1−3	0−2−2	**7−6−3**
Montreal	3−1	3−1	3−1	—	2−2	**11−5−0**
Pittsburgh	2−1−1	2−2	2−0−2	2−2	—	**8−5−3**

**Vs. Adams Division**

1980–81 NHL records
Team	**BOS**	**BUF**	**MIN**	**QUE**	**TOR**	**Total**
Detroit	0−2−2	0−3−1	0−2−2	0−3−1	3−1	**3−11−6**
Hartford	1−1−2	1−2−1	1−3	2−2	1−1−2	**6−9−5**
Los Angeles	2−2	1−2−1	4−0	3−1	3−0−1	**13−5−2**
Montreal	3−1	3−1	1−2−1	1−1−2	3−1	**11−6−3**
Pittsburgh	0−3−1	0−3−1	1−3	2−1−1	1−2−1	**4−12−4**

==== Vs. Campbell Conference ====
**Vs. Patrick Division**

1980–81 NHL records
Team	**CGY**	**NYI**	**NYR**	**PHI**	**WSH**	**Total**
Detroit	1−2−1	0−4	2−1−1	1−3	1−2−1	**5−12−3**
Hartford	1−3	0−2−2	1−3	0−3−1	1−3	**3−14−3**
Los Angeles	1−3	2−2	3−1	0−4	2−1−1	**8−11−1**
Montreal	2−1−1	1−2−1	2−1−1	2−1−1	2−0−2	**9−5−6**
Pittsburgh	1−2−1	2−1−1	2−1−1	0−4	2−1−1	**7−9−4**

**Vs. Smythe Division**

1980–81 NHL records
Team	**CHI**	**COL**	**EDM**	**STL**	**VAN**	**WIN**	**Total**
Detroit	1−1−2	2−1−1	1−2−1	0−4	1−2−1	3−0−1	**8−10−6**
Hartford	0−3−1	2−1−1	1−2−1	0−3−1	1−1−2	3−0−1	**7−10−7**
Los Angeles	2−0−2	3−0−1	2−0−2	0−2−2	4−0	4−0	**15−2−7**
Montreal	2−2	4−0	2−2	1−1−2	2−0−2	3−1	**14−6−4**
Pittsburgh	1−3	3−1	1−2−1	2−2	0−3−1	4−0	**11−11−2**

== Schedule and results ==
1980–81 regular season
October

Game	Result	Date	Score	Opponent	Record
1	L	October 11, 1980	4–5	Chicago Black Hawks (1980–81)	0–1–0
2	L	October 12, 1980	2–3	@ Boston Bruins (1980–81)	0–2–0
3	T	October 15, 1980	3–3	@ Washington Capitals (1980–81)	0–2–1
4	W	October 18, 1980	4–1	Vancouver Canucks (1980–81)	1–2–1
5	L	October 19, 1980	1–2	@ Philadelphia Flyers (1980–81)	1–3–1
6	L	October 21, 1980	3–4	@ St. Louis Blues (1980–81)	1–4–1
7	W	October 23, 1980	7–2	@ Chicago Black Hawks (1980–81)	2–4–1
8	L	October 25, 1980	2–5	Buffalo Sabres (1980–81)	2–5–1
9	L	October 28, 1980	4–6	@ New York Islanders (1980–81)	2–6–1
10	W	October 30, 1980	8–2	Hartford Whalers (1980–81)	3–6–1

November

Game	Result	Date	Score	Opponent	Record
11	W	November 1, 1980	7–4	New York Rangers (1980–81)	4–6–1
12	W	November 4, 1980	5–4	Quebec Nordiques (1980–81)	5–6–1
13	L	November 6, 1980	2–3	@ Detroit Red Wings (1980–81)	5–7–1
14	W	November 8, 1980	3–0	Los Angeles Kings (1980–81)	6–7–1
15	W	November 11, 1980	8–2	@ Colorado Rockies (1980–81)	7–7–1
16	W	November 12, 1980	8–4	@ Los Angeles Kings (1980–81)	8–7–1
17	T	November 14, 1980	3–3	@ Vancouver Canucks (1980–81)	8–7–2
18	W	November 16, 1980	5–1	@ Winnipeg Jets (1980–81)	9–7–2
19	W	November 19, 1980	5–4	@ Toronto Maple Leafs (1980–81)	10–7–2
20	W	November 20, 1980	7–3	Detroit Red Wings (1980–81)	11–7–2
21	W	November 22, 1980	7–3	Philadelphia Flyers (1980–81)	12–7–2
22	L	November 25, 1980	4–5	Calgary Flames (1980–81)	12–8–2
23	L	November 27, 1980	3–4	New York Islanders (1980–81)	12–9–2
24	L	November 29, 1980	2–4	Minnesota North Stars (1980–81)	12–10–2

December

Game	Result	Date	Score	Opponent	Record
25	W	December 3, 1980	6–5	@ Buffalo Sabres (1980–81)	13–10–2
26	L	December 4, 1980	2–3	Pittsburgh Penguins (1980–81)	13–11–2
27	W	December 6, 1980	4–1	Boston Bruins (1980–81)	14–11–2
28	L	December 10, 1980	3–4	@ Pittsburgh Penguins (1980–81)	14–12–2
29	W	December 11, 1980	5–2	Toronto Maple Leafs (1980–81)	15–12–2
30	W	December 13, 1980	4–1	Edmonton Oilers (1980–81)	16–12–2
31	T	December 17, 1980	4–4	@ Vancouver Canucks (1980–81)	16–12–3
32	W	December 18, 1980	4–0	@ Calgary Flames (1980–81)	17–12–3
33	L	December 20, 1980	3–4	@ Edmonton Oilers (1980–81)	17–13–3
34	T	December 23, 1980	2–2	@ Quebec Nordiques (1980–81)	17–13–4
35	W	December 27, 1980	7–4	Washington Capitals (1980–81)	18–13–4
36	W	December 28, 1980	5–2	@ New York Rangers (1980–81)	19–13–4
37	W	December 30, 1980	4–0	Los Angeles Kings (1980–81)	20–13–4

January

Game	Result	Date	Score	Opponent	Record
38	W	January 2, 1981	3–1	@ Hartford Whalers (1980–81)	21–13–4
39	W	January 3, 1981	2–1	Chicago Black Hawks (1980–81)	22–13–4
40	W	January 6, 1981	6–2	@ Detroit Red Wings (1980–81)	23–13–4
41	W	January 8, 1981	4–2	Pittsburgh Penguins (1980–81)	24–13–4
42	T	January 10, 1981	5–5	Quebec Nordiques (1980–81)	24–13–5
43	W	January 12, 1981	5–0	Edmonton Oilers (1980–81)	25–13–5
44	W	January 15, 1981	7–3	Winnipeg Jets (1980–81)	26–13–5
45	L	January 17, 1981	5–6	@ Toronto Maple Leafs (1980–81)	26–14–5
46	L	January 19, 1981	3–6	@ Minnesota North Stars (1980–81)	26–15–5
47	L	January 21, 1981	2–4	@ Chicago Black Hawks (1980–81)	26–16–5
48	W	January 24, 1981	6–3	Philadelphia Flyers (1980–81)	27–16–5
49	L	January 28, 1981	1–9	@ Edmonton Oilers (1980–81)	27–17–5
50	T	January 29, 1981	4–4	@ Calgary Flames (1980–81)	27–17–6
51	L	January 31, 1981	1–4	@ Los Angeles Kings (1980–81)	27–18–6

February

Game	Result	Date	Score	Opponent	Record
52	W	February 3, 1981	5–2	@ Colorado Rockies (1980–81)	28–18–6
53	W	February 5, 1981	7–0	Minnesota North Stars (1980–81)	29–18–6
54	W	February 7, 1981	6–2	Boston Bruins (1980–81)	30–18–6
55	T	February 12, 1981	3–3	St. Louis Blues (1980–81)	30–18–7
56	W	February 14, 1981	6–1	Washington Capitals (1980–81)	31–18–7
57	T	February 15, 1981	5–5	@ Philadelphia Flyers (1980–81)	31–18–8
58	W	February 19, 1981	5–2	Buffalo Sabres (1980–81)	32–18–8
59	W	February 21, 1981	4–1	Detroit Red Wings (1980–81)	33–18–8
60	W	February 22, 1981	4–2	@ Buffalo Sabres (1980–81)	34–18–8
61	T	February 24, 1981	2–2	@ St. Louis Blues (1980–81)	34–18–9
62	W	February 26, 1981	6–0	Colorado Rockies (1980–81)	35–18–9
63	W	February 28, 1981	5–3	Toronto Maple Leafs (1980–81)	36–18–9

March

Game	Result	Date	Score	Opponent	Record
64	T	March 1, 1981	4–4	@ New York Rangers (1980–81)	36–18–10
65	W	March 4, 1981	9–3	Winnipeg Jets (1980–81)	37–18–10
66	L	March 7, 1981	2–4	@ Winnipeg Jets (1980–81)	37–19–10
67	T	March 9, 1981	1–1	@ Minnesota North Stars (1980–81)	37–19–11
68	W	March 11, 1981	2–1	@ Pittsburgh Penguins (1980–81)	38–19–11
69	W	March 12, 1981	4–3	St. Louis Blues (1980–81)	39–19–11
70	W	March 14, 1981	2–1	Colorado Rockies (1980–81)	40–19–11
71	T	March 17, 1981	3–3	@ New York Islanders (1980–81)	40–19–12
72	L	March 18, 1981	3–9	@ Hartford Whalers (1980–81)	40–20–12
73	W	March 21, 1981	5–3	Vancouver Canucks (1980–81)	41–20–12
74	T	March 22, 1981	2–2	@ Washington Capitals (1980–81)	41–20–13
75	W	March 26, 1981	8–2	Calgary Flames (1980–81)	42–20–13
76	L	March 28, 1981	2–6	New York Rangers (1980–81)	42–21–13
77	L	March 29, 1981	0–4	@ Quebec Nordiques (1980–81)	42–22–13
78	W	March 31, 1981	3–1	New York Islanders (1980–81)	43–22–13

April

Game	Result	Date	Score	Opponent	Record
79	W	April 3, 1981	6–1	Hartford Whalers (1980–81)	44–22–13
80	W	April 5, 1981	4–2	@ Boston Bruins (1980–81)	45–22–13

Legend: Win (2 points) Loss (0 points) Tie (1 point)

== Playoffs ==
The Canadiens were swept in three games by the Edmonton Oilers. In Game One of the series, Wayne Gretzky had five assists. This was a single game playoff record.

== Player statistics ==
=== Regular season ===
==== Scoring ====
Player	Pos	GP	G	A	Pts	PIM	+/-	PPG	SHG	GWG
Steve Shutt	LW	77	35	38	73	51	30	7	0	3
Mark Napier	RW	79	35	36	71	24	34	5	0	6
Guy Lafleur	RW	51	27	43	70	29	24	7	0	7
Mario Tremblay	RW	77	25	38	63	123	16	4	1	4
Rejean Houle	W	77	27	31	58	83	20	6	1	3
Yvon Lambert	LW	73	22	32	54	39	7	4	0	3
Pierre Larouche	C	61	25	28	53	28	13	5	0	2
Larry Robinson	D	65	12	38	50	37	46	7	0	2
Bob Gainey	LW	78	23	24	47	36	13	5	3	3
Rod Langway	D	80	11	34	45	120	53	5	1	2
Pierre Mondou	C	57	17	24	41	16	24	5	0	2
Keith Acton	C	61	15	24	39	74	5	3	0	2
Doug Jarvis	C	80	16	22	38	34	12	0	2	1
Doug Risebrough	C	48	13	21	34	93	7	1	0	1
Brian Engblom	D	80	3	25	28	96	63	1	0	0
Gaston Gingras	D	55	5	16	21	22	5	3	0	1
Serge Savard	D	77	4	13	17	30	12	0	0	1
Chris Nilan	RW	57	7	8	15	262	7	0	0	1
Doug Wickenheiser	C	41	7	8	15	20	5	2	0	0
Guy Lapointe	D	33	1	9	10	79	-6	1	0	1
Robert Picard	D	8	2	2	4	6	-1	1	0	0
Denis Herron	G	25	0	2	2	0	0	0	0	0
Guy Carbonneau	C	2	0	1	1	0	0	0	0	0
Michel Larocque	G	28	0	1	1	2	0	0	0	0
Bill Baker	D	11	0	0	0	32	-1	0	0	0
Rick Chartraw	D/RW	14	0	0	0	4	-5	0	0	0
Yvan Joly	RW	1	0	0	0	0	0	0	0	0
Dave Orleski	LW	1	0	0	0	0	0	0	0	0
Richard Sevigny	G	33	0	0	0	30	0	0	0	0
Rick Wamsley	G	5	0	0	0	0	0	0	0	0

==== Goaltending ====
Player	MIN	GP	W	L	T	GA	GAA	SO
Richard Sevigny	1777	33	20	4	3	71	2.40	2
Michel Larocque	1623	28	16	9	3	82	3.03	1
Denis Herron	1147	25	6	9	6	67	3.50	1
Rick Wamsley	253	5	3	0	1	8	1.90	1
Team:	4800	80	45	22	13	228	2.85	5

=== Playoffs ===
==== Scoring ====
Player	Pos	GP	G	A	Pts	PIM	PPG	SHG	GWG
Steve Shutt	LW	3	2	1	3	4	0	0	0
Pierre Larouche	C	2	0	2	2	0	0	0	0
Brian Engblom	D	3	1	0	1	4	0	0	0
Gaston Gingras	D	1	1	0	1	0	1	0	0
Rejean Houle	W	3	1	0	1	6	0	0	0
Doug Risebrough	C	3	1	0	1	0	1	0	0
Guy Lafleur	RW	3	0	1	1	2	0	0	0
Pierre Mondou	C	3	0	1	1	0	0	0	0
Larry Robinson	D	3	0	1	1	2	0	0	0
Keith Acton	C	2	0	0	0	6	0	0	0
Bob Gainey	LW	3	0	0	0	2	0	0	0
Doug Jarvis	C	3	0	0	0	0	0	0	0
Yvon Lambert	LW	3	0	0	0	2	0	0	0
Rod Langway	D	3	0	0	0	6	0	0	0
Guy Lapointe	D	1	0	0	0	17	0	0	0
Mark Napier	RW	3	0	0	0	2	0	0	0
Chris Nilan	RW	2	0	0	0	0	0	0	0
Robert Picard	D	1	0	0	0	0	0	0	0
Serge Savard	D	3	0	0	0	0	0	0	0
Richard Sevigny	G	3	0	0	0	0	0	0	0
Mario Tremblay	RW	3	0	0	0	9	0	0	0

==== Goaltending ====
Player	MIN	GP	W	L	GA	GAA	SO
Richard Sevigny	180	3	0	3	13	4.33	0
Team:	180	3	0	3	13	4.33	0

Note:

Pos = Position;GP = Games played; G = Goals; A = Assists; Pts = Points; PIM = Penalty minutes; +/- = Plus/minus; PPG = Power-play goals; SHG = Short-handed goals; GWG = Game-winning goals
Pos = Position;GP = Games played; Min, TOI = Minutes played; W = Wins; L = Losses; T,T/OT = Ties; OTL = Overtime losses; GA = Goals-against; GAA = Goals-against average; SO = Shutouts; SA = Shots against; SV = Shots saved;SV% = Save percentage;

== Transactions ==
The Canadiens were involved in the following transactions during the 1980–81 season.

=== Trades ===
June 5, 1980	To Montreal Canadiens 3rd round pick in 1981 – Dieter Hegen; 5th round pick in 1981 – Steve Rooney	To Hartford Whalers Rick Meagher; 3rd round pick in 1981 – Paul MacDermid; 5th round pick in 1981 – Dan Bourbonnais
September 1, 1980	To Montreal Canadiens Dave Gorman	To Calgary Flames Tim Burke
September 1, 1980	To Montreal Canadiens Future considerations	To Minnesota North Stars Bill Nyrop
September 26, 1980	To Montreal Canadiens 2nd round pick in 1982 – David Maley	To Winnipeg Jets Norm Dupont
September 26, 1980	To Montreal Canadiens 3rd round pick in 1983 – Peter Taglianetti	To Pittsburgh Penguins Gilles Lupien; 3rd round pick in 1983 – Mike Rowe
February 17, 1981	To Montreal Canadiens 2nd round pick in 1983 – Claude Lemieux	To Los Angeles Kings Rick Chartraw
March 10, 1981	To Montreal Canadiens 3rd round pick in 1983 – Daniel Letendre; 4th round pick in 1984 – Lee Brodeur	To Colorado Rockies Bill Baker; 4th round pick in 1984 – Paul Ysebaert
March 10, 1981	To Montreal Canadiens Robert Picard; 8th round pick in 1982 – Steve Smith	To Toronto Maple Leafs Michel Larocque

=== Free agent signings ===
March 9, 1981	From Cornwall Royals (QMJHL) Dan Daoust

== Draft picks ==
The 1980 NHL entry draft was hosted at the Montreal Forum. It would mark the first time that an NHL arena hosted the event.

Round	#	Player	Nationality	College/junior/club team
1	1	Doug Wickenheiser	Canada	Regina Pats (WHL)
2	27	Ric Nattress	Canada	Brantford Alexanders (OHA)
2	40	John Chabot	Canada	Hull Olympiques (QMJHL)
3	45	John Newberry	Canada	Nanaimo Clippers (BCJHL)
3	61	Craig Ludwig	United States	University of North Dakota (NCAA)
4	82	Jeff Teal	United States	University of Minnesota (WCHA)
5	103	Remi Gagne	Canada	Chicoutimi Saguenéens (QMJHL)
6	124	Mike McPhee	Canada	Rennssaeler Polytechnic Institute (ECAC)
7	145	Bill Norton	United States	Clarkson University (ECAC)
8	166	Steve Penney	Canada	Shawinigan Cataractes (QMJHL)
9	187	John Schmidt	United States	University of Notre Dame (WCHA)
10	208	Scott Robinson	Canada	University of Denver (WCHA)

== See also ==
- 1980–81 NHL season
