= 1980–81 Edmonton Oilers season =

NHL team season

1980–81 Edmonton Oilers
- Division: 4th Smythe
- Conference: 8th Campbell
- 1980–81 record: 29–35–16
- Home record: 17–13–10
- Road record: 12–22–6
- Goals for: 328
- Goals against: 327

Team information
- General manager: Glen Sather
- Coach: Bryan Watson (Oct-Nov); Glen Sather (Nov-Apr)
- Captain: Blair MacDonald (Oct-Mar); Lee Fogolin (Mar-Apr)
- Alternate captains: None
- Arena: Northlands Coliseum
- Average attendance: 17,423 (99.7%)
- Minor league affiliates: Wichita Wind (CHL); Milwaukee Admirals (IHL)

Team leaders
- Goals: Wayne Gretzky (55)
- Assists: Wayne Gretzky (109)
- Points: Wayne Gretzky (164)
- Penalty minutes: Pat Price (193)
- Plus/minus: Wayne Gretzky (+41)
- Wins: Eddie Mio (16)
- Goals against average: Gary Edwards (3.62)

The 1980–81 Edmonton Oilers season was the Oilers' second season in the NHL, and they finished with 74 points, a 5-point improvement from their first season.

Wayne Gretzky ran away with the Art Ross Trophy, awarded to the leading scorer, as he finished with 164 points, 29 points ahead of runner-up Marcel Dionne of the Los Angeles Kings. Gretzky also won his second consecutive Hart Memorial Trophy, awarded to the MVP of the NHL. His 164 points were an NHL record, previously held by Phil Esposito of the Boston Bruins in the 1970–71 NHL season when he scored 152 points. Youngsters Jari Kurri and Mark Messier had very good offensive seasons, finishing second and third on the Oilers scoring list.

Eddie Mio got the majority of the action in the Oilers' goal, playing in a team-high 43 games and having 16 wins, which set a franchise record.

In the playoffs, the Oilers faced the heavily favoured Montreal Canadiens in the first round, and they shocked the hockey world by sweeping Montreal in 3 games. In the quarter-finals, the Oilers played the defending Stanley Cup champion and heavily favored New York Islanders and took them to 6 games before being eliminated.

The season also saw one of their roster players, Don Ashby died in a car accident in the Okanagan Valley. The vehicle that he was driving was hit head-on by a pickup truck. Ashby was critically injured in the accident and died afterward from massive internal injuries in the hospital in Kelowna, British Columbia.

== Season standings ==
Smythe Division
	GP	W	L	T	GF	GA	Pts
**St. Louis Blues**	80	45	18	17	352	281	107
**Chicago Black Hawks**	80	31	33	16	304	315	78
**Vancouver Canucks**	80	28	32	20	289	301	76
**Edmonton Oilers**	80	29	35	16	328	327	74
Colorado Rockies	80	22	45	13	258	344	57
Winnipeg Jets	80	9	57	14	246	400	32

Note: GP = Games played, W = Wins, L = Losses, T = Ties, Pts = Points, GF = Goals for, GA = Goals against
Note: Teams that qualified for the playoffs are highlighted in bold.

League standings
R		Div	GP	W	L	T	GF	GA	Pts
1	**p – New York Islanders**	PTK	80	48	18	14	355	260	110
2	**x – St. Louis Blues**	SMY	80	45	18	17	352	281	107
3	**y – Montreal Canadiens**	NRS	80	45	22	13	332	232	103
4	**Los Angeles Kings**	NRS	80	43	24	13	337	290	99
5	**x – Buffalo Sabres**	ADM	80	39	20	21	327	250	99
6	**Philadelphia Flyers**	PTK	80	41	24	15	313	249	97
7	**Calgary Flames**	PTK	80	39	27	14	329	298	92
8	**Boston Bruins**	ADM	80	37	30	13	316	272	87
9	**Minnesota North Stars**	ADM	80	35	28	17	291	263	87
10	**Chicago Black Hawks**	SMY	80	31	33	16	304	315	78
11	**Quebec Nordiques**	ADM	80	30	32	18	314	318	78
12	**Vancouver Canucks**	SMY	80	28	32	20	289	301	76
13	**New York Rangers**	PTK	80	30	36	14	312	317	74
14	**Edmonton Oilers**	SMY	80	29	35	16	328	327	74
15	**Pittsburgh Penguins**	NRS	80	30	37	13	302	345	73
16	**Toronto Maple Leafs**	ADM	80	28	37	15	322	367	71
17	Washington Capitals	PTK	80	26	36	18	286	317	70
18	Hartford Whalers	NRS	80	21	41	18	292	372	60
19	Colorado Rockies	SMY	80	22	45	13	258	344	57
20	Detroit Red Wings	NRS	80	19	43	18	252	339	56
21	Winnipeg Jets	SMY	80	9	57	14	246	400	32

Divisions: ADM – Adams, NRS – Norris, PTK – Patrick, SMY – Smythe

bold – The top 16 teams in the league qualified for the playoffs, regardless of division or conference.
x – Won division; y – Won Conference (and division); p – Won Presidents' Trophy (and conference and division)

=== Record vs. opponents ===
Smythe Division record vs. opponents

==== Vs. Campbell Conference ====
**Vs. Smythe Division**

1980–81 NHL records
Team	**CHI**	**COL**	**EDM**	**STL**	**VAN**	**WIN**	**Total**
Chicago	—	2−2	1−3	1−2−1	2−2	3−1	9−10−1
Colorado	2−2	—	3−0−1	1−3	0−2−2	1−2−1	7−9−4
Edmonton	3−1	0−3−1	—	1−2−1	2−2	4−0	10−8−2
St. Louis	2−1−1	3−1	2−1−1	—	4−0	2−0−2	13−3−4
Vancouver	2−2	2−0−2	2−2	0−4	—	2−0−2	8−8−4
Winnipeg	1−3	2−1−1	0−4	0−2−2	0−2−2	—	3−12−5

**Vs. Patrick Division**

1980–81 NHL records
Team	**CGY**	**NYI**	**NYR**	**PHI**	**WSH**	**Total**
Chicago	1−0−3	0−4	1−2−1	1−1−2	1−1−2	4−8−8
Colorado	3−1	1−3	3−1	0−4	0−3−1	7−12−1
Edmonton	1−2−1	0−2−2	1−2−1	2−2	1−2−1	5−10−5
St. Louis	2−2	0−2−2	4−0	0−3−1	2−0−2	8−7−5
Vancouver	1−3	1−3	1−2−1	2−1−1	1−1−2	6−10−4
Winnipeg	0−3−1	0−3−1	1−3	1−3	0−3−1	2−15−3

**Vs. Wales Conference**

**Vs. Adams Division**

1980–81 NHL records
Team	**BOS**	**BUF**	**MIN**	**QUE**	**TOR**	**Total**
Chicago	1−3	2−2	2−2	3−0−1	1−2−1	9−9−2
Colorado	1−2−1	0−3−1	1−2−1	2−2	1−1−2	5−10−5
Edmonton	1−3	1−1−2	1−2−1	1−3	2−1−1	6−10−4
St. Louis	3−1	3−0−1	1−2−1	2−1−1	3−1	12−5−3
Vancouver	2−2	1−1−2	1−2−1	1−1−2	3−0−1	8−6−6
Winnipeg	0−2−2	0−4	0−4	1−1−2	2−2	3−13−4

**Vs. Norris Division**

1980–81 NHL records
Team	**DET**	**HFD**	**LAK**	**MTL**	**PIT**	**Total**
Chicago	1−1−2	3−0−1	0−2−2	2−2	3−1	9−6−5
Colorado	1−2−1	1−2−1	0−3−1	0−4	1−3	3−14−3
Edmonton	2−1−1	2−1−1	0−2−2	2−2	2−1−1	8−7−5
St. Louis	4−0	3−0−1	2−0−2	1−1−2	2−2	12−3−5
Vancouver	2−1−1	1−1−2	0−4	0−2−2	3−0−1	6−8−6
Winnipeg	0−3−1	0−3−1	0−4	1−3	0−4	1−17−2

== Schedule and results ==
1980–81 regular season
October: 2–4–3 (home: 1–3–2; road: 1–1–1)

Game	Date	Visitor	Score	Home	OT	Decision	Attendance	Record	Pts	Recap
1	October 10	Quebec Nordiques	7 – 4	Edmonton Oilers		LoPresti	17,334	0–1–0	0	
2	October 12	Colorado Rockies	3 – 2	Edmonton Oilers		Mio	17,500	0–2–0	0	
3	October 15	Edmonton Oilers	0 – 2	Buffalo Sabres		Low	16,433	0–3–0	0	
4	October 18	Edmonton Oilers	5 – 5	New York Islanders		Low	15,782	0–3–1	1	
5	October 19	Edmonton Oilers	4 – 2	New York Rangers		Low	17,425	1–3–1	3	
6	October 22	Calgary Flames	3 – 5	Edmonton Oilers		Low	17,396	2–3–1	5	
7	October 24	Minnesota North Stars	4 – 2	Edmonton Oilers		Low	17,314	2–4–1	5	
8	October 26	Los Angeles Kings	4 – 4	Edmonton Oilers		Low	17,290	2–4–2	6	
9	October 29	Toronto Maple Leafs	4 – 4	Edmonton Oilers		Low	17,475	2–4–3	7	

November: 4–8–2 (home: 2–2–2; road: 2–6–0)

Game	Date	Visitor	Score	Home	OT	Decision	Attendance	Record	Pts	Recap
10	November 1	Washington Capitals	2 – 2	Edmonton Oilers		Mio	17,308	2–4–4	8	
11	November 3	Pittsburgh Penguins	4 – 4	Edmonton Oilers		Mio	17,211	2–4–5	9	
12	November 5	Edmonton Oilers	3 – 4	Vancouver Canucks		Low	12,364	2–5–5	9	
13	November 7	Edmonton Oilers	4 – 2	Winnipeg Jets		Low	12,744	3–5–5	11	
14	November 9	St. Louis Blues	6 – 4	Edmonton Oilers		Low	17,474	3–6–5	11	
15	November 13	Edmonton Oilers	1 – 8	Philadelphia Flyers		Low	17,077	3–7–5	11	
16	November 15	Edmonton Oilers	2 – 4	Toronto Maple Leafs		Low	16,485	3–8–5	11	
17	November 16	Edmonton Oilers	5 – 4	Chicago Black Hawks		Mio	10,105	4–8–5	13	
18	November 19	Vancouver Canucks	6 – 4	Edmonton Oilers		Mio	17,341	4–9–5	13	
19	November 23	Buffalo Sabres	3 – 6	Edmonton Oilers		Low	17,474	5–9–5	15	
20	November 25	Edmonton Oilers	3 – 4	Colorado Rockies		Low	6,107	5–10–5	15	
21	November 26	Chicago Black Hawks	3 – 10	Edmonton Oilers		Low	17,283	6–10–5	17	
22	November 28	Edmonton Oilers	4 – 6	Hartford Whalers		Mio	11,073	6–11–5	17	
23	November 29	Edmonton Oilers	3 – 6	Boston Bruins		Low	10,362	6–12–5	17	

December: 2–9–1 (home: 2–3–1; road: 0–6–0)

Game	Date	Visitor	Score	Home	OT	Decision	Attendance	Record	Pts	Recap
24	December 5	New York Rangers	5 – 1	Edmonton Oilers		Low	17,300	6–13–5	17	
25	December 7	Hartford Whalers	4 – 6	Edmonton Oilers		Mio	17,215	7–13–5	19	
26	December 10	New York Islanders	3 – 2	Edmonton Oilers		Low	17,474	7–14–5	19	
27	December 13	Edmonton Oilers	1 – 4	Montreal Canadiens		Low	16,149	7–15–5	19	
28	December 14	Edmonton Oilers	5 – 6	Quebec Nordiques		Mio	9,346	7–16–5	19	
29	December 16	Edmonton Oilers	3 – 4	Detroit Red Wings		Mio	11,307	7–17–5	19	
30	December 17	Edmonton Oilers	2 – 5	Washington Capitals		Low	7,596	7–18–5	19	
31	December 20	Montreal Canadiens	3 – 4	Edmonton Oilers		Mio	17,474	8–18–5	21	
32	December 23	Edmonton Oilers	4 – 7	Los Angeles Kings		Mio	8,513	8–19–5	21	
33	December 27	Detroit Red Wings	4 – 4	Edmonton Oilers		Mio	17,447	8–19–6	22	
34	December 28	Philadelphia Flyers	2 – 1	Edmonton Oilers		Moog	17,474	8–20–6	22	
35	December 30	Edmonton Oilers	3 – 5	Calgary Flames		Mio	7,243	8–21–6	22	

January: 7–4–3 (home: 5–1–2; road: 2–3–1)

Game	Date	Visitor	Score	Home	OT	Decision	Attendance	Record	Pts	Recap
36	January 2	Boston Bruins	5 – 7	Edmonton Oilers		Moog	17,474	9–21–6	24	
37	January 3	Toronto Maple Leafs	1 – 4	Edmonton Oilers		Mio	17,474	10–21–6	26	
38	January 7	Washington Capitals	3 – 6	Edmonton Oilers		Mio	17,310	11–21–6	28	
39	January 9	Hartford Whalers	6 – 6	Edmonton Oilers		Mio	17,474	11–21–7	29	
40	January 11	Edmonton Oilers	6 – 3	Quebec Nordiques		Mio	10,532	12–21–7	31	
41	January 12	Edmonton Oilers	0 – 5	Montreal Canadiens		Mio	15,922	12–22–7	31	
42	January 14	Edmonton Oilers	7 – 4	Toronto Maple Leafs		Mio	16,485	13–22–7	33	
43	January 16	Edmonton Oilers	5 – 5	Buffalo Sabres		Mio	16,433	13–22–8	34	
44	January 17	Edmonton Oilers	6 – 7	St. Louis Blues		Mio	15,266	13–23–8	34	
45	January 21	Vancouver Canucks	1 – 5	Edmonton Oilers		Mio	17,474	14–23–8	36	
46	January 23	New York Rangers	7 – 4	Edmonton Oilers		Mio	17,474	14–24–8	36	
47	January 24	Edmonton Oilers	1 – 6	Minnesota North Stars		Low	15,651	14–25–8	36	
48	January 28	Montreal Canadiens	1 – 9	Edmonton Oilers		Mio	17,474	15–25–8	38	
49	January 30	Chicago Black Hawks	2 – 4	Edmonton Oilers		Mio	17,574	16–25–8	40	

February: 5–7–2 (home: 4–3–1; road: 1–4–1)

Game	Date	Visitor	Score	Home	OT	Decision	Attendance	Record	Pts	Recap
50	February 1	Edmonton Oilers	4 – 7	Washington Capitals		Mio	15,889	16–26–8	40	
51	February 3	Edmonton Oilers	3 – 3	St. Louis Blues		Mio	11,260	16–26–9	41	
52	February 4	Edmonton Oilers	3 – 6	Chicago Black Hawks		Mio	10,397	16–27–9	41	
53	February 6	Winnipeg Jets	4 – 10	Edmonton Oilers		Mio	17,455	17–27–9	43	
54	February 8	Calgary Flames	10 – 4	Edmonton Oilers		Mio	17,490	17–28–9	43	
55	February 13	Quebec Nordiques	4 – 2	Edmonton Oilers		Mio	17,490	17–29–9	43	
56	February 15	Buffalo Sabres	2 – 2	Edmonton Oilers		Edwards	17,077	17–29–10	44	
57	February 18	St. Louis Blues	2 – 9	Edmonton Oilers		Mio	17,490	18–29–10	46	
58	February 20	Boston Bruins	5 – 1	Edmonton Oilers		Edwards	17,490	18–30–10	46	
59	February 21	Edmonton Oilers	5 – 1	Winnipeg Jets		Mio	14,873	19–30–10	48	
60	February 24	Edmonton Oilers	2 – 5	Los Angeles Kings		Edwards	9,066	19–31–10	48	
61	February 25	Philadelphia Flyers	2 – 6	Edmonton Oilers		Mio	17,490	20–31–10	50	
62	February 27	Detroit Red Wings	2 – 5	Edmonton Oilers		Mio	17,490	21–31–10	52	
63	February 28	Edmonton Oilers	1 – 3	Colorado Rockies		Mio	8,837	21–32–10	52	

March: 6–3–5 (home: 1–1–2; road: 5–2–3)

Game	Date	Visitor	Score	Home	OT	Decision	Attendance	Record	Pts	Recap
64	March 3	Edmonton Oilers	8 – 8	New York Islanders		Mio	15,008	21–32–11	53	
65	March 4	Edmonton Oilers	5 – 5	New York Rangers		Mio	17,418	21–32–12	54	
66	March 7	Edmonton Oilers	5 – 3	Philadelphia Flyers		Edwards	17,077	22–32–12	56	
67	March 8	Edmonton Oilers	4 – 6	Pittsburgh Penguins		Mio	12,099	22–33–12	56	
68	March 12	New York Islanders	5 – 0	Edmonton Oilers		Edwards	17,490	22–34–12	56	
69	March 15	Edmonton Oilers	3 – 3	Calgary Flames		Mio	7,226	22–34–13	57	
70	March 16	Pittsburgh Penguins	6 – 7	Edmonton Oilers		Mio	17,490	23–34–13	59	
71	March 18	Edmonton Oilers	5 – 3	Minnesota North Stars		Edwards	12,261	24–34–13	61	
72	March 20	Minnesota North Stars	1 – 1	Edmonton Oilers		Edwards	17,490	24–34–14	62	
73	March 21	Los Angeles Kings	6 – 6	Edmonton Oilers		Edwards	17,490	24–34–15	63	
74	March 23	Edmonton Oilers	2 – 7	Boston Bruins		Moog	9,909	24–35–15	63	
75	March 25	Edmonton Oilers	7 – 2	Hartford Whalers		Edwards	11,405	25–35–15	65	
76	March 28	Edmonton Oilers	4 – 2	Detroit Red Wings		Edwards	15,041	26–35–15	66	
77	March 29	Edmonton Oilers	5 – 2	Pittsburgh Penguins		Moog	12,966	27–35–15	68	

April: 2–0–1 (home: 1–0–1; road: 1–0–0)

Game	Date	Visitor	Score	Home	OT	Decision	Attendance	Record	Pts	Recap
78	April 1	Colorado Rockies	4 – 4	Edmonton Oilers		Edwards	17,490	27–35–16	70	
79	April 3	Edmonton Oilers	7 – 2	Vancouver Canucks		Moog	16,413	28–35–16	72	
80	April 4	Winnipeg Jets	2 – 7	Edmonton Oilers		Edwards	17,490	29–35–16	74	

Legend: Win (2 points) Loss (0 points) Tie (1 point)

== Playoffs ==
In Game One of the series versus Montreal, Wayne Gretzky had five assists. This was a single game playoff record.

1981 Stanley Cup playoffs
Preliminary Round vs. (3) Montreal Canadiens – Oilers win 3–0

Game	Date	Visitor	Score	Home	OT	Decision	Attendance	Series	Recap
1	April 8	Edmonton Oilers	6 – 3	Montreal Canadiens		Moog	15,792	1–0	
2	April 9	Edmonton Oilers	3 – 1	Montreal Canadiens		Moog	15,527	2–0	
3	April 11	Montreal Canadiens	2 – 6	Edmonton Oilers		Moog	17,490	3–0	

Quarterfinals vs. (1) New York Islanders – Islanders win 4–2

Game	Date	Visitor	Score	Home	OT	Decision	Attendance	Series	Recap
1	April 16	Edmonton Oilers	2 – 8	New York Islanders		Moog	15,008	0–1	
2	April 17	Edmonton Oilers	3 – 6	New York Islanders		Moog	15,008	0–2	
3	April 19	New York Islanders	2 – 5	Edmonton Oilers		Moog	17,490	1–2	
4	April 20	New York Islanders	5 – 4	Edmonton Oilers		Moog	17,490	1–3	
5	April 22	Edmonton Oilers	4 – 3	New York Islanders		Moog	15,008	2–3	
6	April 24	New York Islanders	5 – 2	Edmonton Oilers		Moog	17,490	2–4	

Legend: Win Loss

== Season stats ==
=== Scoring leaders ===
Player	GP	G	A	Pts	PIM
Wayne Gretzky	80	55	109	164	28
Jari Kurri	75	32	43	75	40
Mark Messier	72	23	40	63	102
Brett Callighen	55	25	35	60	32
Glenn Anderson	58	30	23	53	24

=== Goaltending ===
Player	GP	TOI	W	L	T	GA	SO	GAA
Gary Edwards	15	729	5	3	4	44	0	3.62
Andy Moog	7	313	3	3	0	20	0	3.83
Eddie Mio	43	2393	16	15	9	155	0	3.89
Ron Low	24	1260	5	13	3	93	0	4.43
Pete LoPresti	2	105	0	1	0	8	0	4.57

== Playoff stats ==
=== Scoring leaders ===
Player	GP	G	A	Pts	PIM
Wayne Gretzky	9	7	14	21	4
Glenn Anderson	9	5	7	12	12
Jari Kurri	9	5	7	12	4
Brett Callighen	9	4	4	8	6
Paul Coffey	9	4	3	7	22

=== Goaltending ===
Player	GP	TOI	W	L	GA	SO	GAA
Andy Moog	9	526	5	4	32	0	3.65
Gary Edwards	1	20	0	0	2	0	6.00

== Awards and records ==
=== Records ===
- 164: an NHL record for most points in a single season by Wayne Gretzky.

- 153: A new NHL record for most points in a single season by Wayne Gretzky on March 29, 1981.

- 109: an NHL record for most assists in a single season by Wayne Gretzky.

- 103: A new NHL record for most assists in a single season by Wayne Gretzky on April 1, 1981.

=== Milestones ===
Regular Season
Player	Milestone	Reached
Glenn Anderson	1st NHL Game	October 10, 1980
Paul Coffey	1st NHL Game	October 10, 1980
Jari Kurri	1st NHL Game; 1st NHL Assist; 1st NHL Point	October 10, 1980
Glenn Anderson	1st NHL Goal; 1st NHL Assist; 1st NHL Point	October 12, 1980
Jari Kurri	1st NHL Goal	October 18, 1980
Paul Coffey	1st NHL Assist; 1st NHL Point	October 19, 1980
Blair MacDonald	100th NHL Point	October 19, 1980
Dave Semenko	1st NHL Hat-trick	October 19, 1980
Paul Coffey	1st NHL Goal	October 22, 1980
Doug Hicks	300th NHL PIM	October 22, 1980
Matti Hagman	100th NHL Game	November 3, 1980
Wayne Gretzky	100th NHL Assist	November 7, 1980
Charlie Huddy	1st NHL Game; 1st NHL Assist; 1st NHL Point	November 15, 1980
Paul Coffey	1st NHL Gordie Howe hat trick	November 16, 1980
Charlie Huddy	1st NHL Goal	November 16, 1980
Don Murdoch	100th NHL Assist	November 16, 1980
Dave Lumley	100th NHL Game	November 25, 1980
Blair MacDonald	100th NHL Game	November 25, 1980
Wayne Gretzky	100th NHL Game	November 26, 1980
Dave Hunter	100th NHL Game	November 26, 1980
Jari Kurri	1st NHL Hat-trick	November 26, 1980
John Hughes	200th NHL PIM	November 28, 1980
Kevin Lowe	100th NHL PIM	December 7, 1980
Mark Messier	100th NHL Game	December 10, 1980
Tom Roulston	1st NHL Game	December 10, 1980
Curt Brackenbury	100th NHL PIM	December 16, 1980
Don Murdoch	100th NHL Assist	December 16, 1980
Tom Roulston	1st NHL Goal; 1st NHL Point	December 16, 1980
Lee Fogolin	100th NHL Point	December 20, 1980
Wayne Gretzky	3rd NHL Hat-trick	December 23, 1980
Andy Moog	1st NHL Game	December 23, 1980
Andy Moog	1st NHL Assist; 1st NHL Point	December 28, 1980
Lee Fogolin	600th NHL PIM	December 30, 1980
Dave Semenko	100th NHL Game	December 30, 1980
Kevin Lowe	100th NHL Game	January 2, 1981
Risto Siltanen	100th NHL Game	January 2, 1981
Andy Moog	1st NHL Win	January 2, 1981
Pat Price	100th NHL Point	January 2, 1981
Wayne Gretzky	200th NHL Point	January 7, 1981
Jari Kurri	2nd NHL Hat-trick	January 11, 1981
Doug Hicks	100th NHL Assist	January 17, 1981
Stan Weir	500th NHL Game	January 23, 1981
Jari Kurri	3rd NHL Hat-trick	January 28, 1981
Roy Sommer	1st NHL Game; 1st NHL Goal; 1st NHL Point	January 28, 1981
Pat Price	300th NHL Game	January 30, 1981
Curt Brackenbury	100th NHL Game	February 1, 1981
Wayne Gretzky	4th NHL Hat-trick; 2nd NHL Natural Hat-trick	February 6, 1981
Wayne Gretzky	5th NHL Hat-trick; 3rd NHL Natural Hat-trick; 1st Five-Goal NHL Game	February 18, 1981
Glenn Anderson	1st NHL Hat-trick; 1st NHL Natural Hat-trick	February 21, 1981
Mark Messier	200th NHL PIM	February 25, 1981
Curt Brackenbury	200th NHL PIM	February 27, 1981
Dave Lumley	200th NHL PIM	February 28, 1981
Brett Callighen	100th NHL Point	March 3, 1981
Mark Messier	1st NHL Gordie Howe Hat-trick	March 4, 1981
Tom Roulston	1st NHL Assist	March 4, 1981
Brett Callighen	100th NHL Game	March 7, 1981
Wayne Gretzky	100th NHL Goal; 6th NHL Hat-trick; 1st Four-Goal NHL Game	March 7, 1981
Wayne Gretzky	50th Goal in 69 Games	March 15, 1981
Brett Callighen	100th NHL PIM	March 16, 1981
Mark Messier	1st NHL Hat-trick	March 16, 1981
Glenn Anderson	2nd NHL Hat-trick	March 25, 1981
Dave Hunter	200th NHL PIM	March 29, 1981
Dave Semenko	200th NHL PIM	March 29, 1981
Wayne Gretzky	300th NHL Point	April 4, 1981
Risto Siltanen	1st NHL Hat-trick	April 4, 1981

Playoffs
Player	Milestone	Reached
Glenn Anderson	1st NHL Game; 1st NHL Goal; 1st NHL Point	April 8, 1981
Paul Coffey	1st NHL Game; 1st NHL Goal; 1st NHL Point	April 8, 1981
Jari Kurri	1st NHL Game; 1st NHL Goal; 1st NHL Assist; 1st NHL Point	April 8, 1981
Garry Lariviere	1st NHL Game; 1st NHL Assist; 1st NHL Point	April 8, 1981
Andy Moog	1st NHL Game; 1st NHL Win	April 8, 1981
Risto Siltanen	1st NHL Goal; 1st NHL Point	April 9, 1981
Glenn Anderson	1st NHL Assist	April 11, 1981
Paul Coffey	1st NHL Assist	April 11, 1981
Wayne Gretzky	1st NHL Hat-trick	April 11, 1981
Matti Hagman	1st NHL Goal	April 11, 1981
Wayne Gretzky	2nd NHL Hat-trick	April 19, 1981
Doug Hicks	1st NHL Assist	April 20, 1981
Curt Brackenbury	1st NHL Game	April 22, 1981

== Transactions ==
=== Trades ===
Date	Details	
June 11, 1980	To Philadelphia Flyers Ron Areshenkoff; 10th-round pick in 1980 – Bob O'Brien	To Edmonton Oilers Barry Dean
June 20, 1980	To Minnesota North Stars Cash	To Edmonton Oilers Jim Corsi
July 10, 1980	To Pittsburgh Penguins Future considerations	To Edmonton Oilers Tom Bladon
February 2, 1981	To Minnesota North Stars 3rd-round pick in 1982 – Wally Chapman	To Edmonton Oilers Gary Edwards
March 10, 1981	To Los Angeles Kings 7th-round pick in 1981 – Craig Hurley	To Edmonton Oilers Garry Unger
March 10, 1981	To New York Rangers John Hughes	To Edmonton Oilers Ray Markham
March 10, 1981	To Pittsburgh Penguins Pat Price	To Edmonton Oilers Pat Hughes
March 10, 1981	To Vancouver Canucks Blair MacDonald; Lars-Gunnar Pettersson	To Edmonton Oilers Garry Lariviere; Ken Berry

=== Players acquired ===
Date	Player	Former team	Term
August 18, 1980	Matti Hagman	HIFK Helsinki (SM-liiga)	1-year

=== Players lost ===
Date	Player	New team
	Larry Brown	Retired
	Bob Kelly	Retired
	Max Kostovich	Retired
	Poul Popiel	Retired
July 14, 1980	Al Hamilton	Retired
	Wayne Bianchin	Asiago Hockey (Serie A)
September 1980	Don Cutts	Vancouver Canucks
November 11, 1980	Tom Bladon	Released
December 13, 1980	Tom Bladon	Winnipeg Jets
	Alec Tidey	Los Angeles Kings

=== Waivers ===
Date	Player	Team
July 2, 1980	Ron Carter	to Buffalo Sabres
October 10, 1980	Curt Brackenbury	from Quebec Nordiques
October 10, 1980	Colin Campbell	to Vancouver Canucks
October 13, 1980	John Hughes	from Vancouver Canucks

=== Signings ===
Date	Player	Term
	Andy Moog	
August 6, 1980	Paul Coffey	4-year
August 6, 1980	Jari Kurri	2-year
August 6, 1980	Pat Price	2-year
August 18, 1980	Shawn Babcock	
August 20, 1980	Ron Low	2-year
September 9, 1980	Glenn Anderson	3-year
September 15, 1980	Tom Bladon	1-year
September 15, 1980	Blair MacDonald	1-year
September 29, 1980	Walt Poddubny	

== Draft picks ==
Edmonton's draft picks at the 1980 NHL entry draft

Round	#	Player	Nationality	College/Junior/Club team (League)
1	6	Paul Coffey	Canada	Kitchener Rangers (OMJHL)
3	48	Shawn Babcock	Canada	Windsor Spitfires (OMJHL)
4	69	Jari Kurri	Finland	Jokerit (SM-liiga)
5	90	Walt Poddubny	Canada	Kingston Canadians (OMJHL)
6	111	Mike Winther	Canada	Brandon Wheat Kings (WHL)
7	132	Andy Moog	Canada	Billings Bighorns (WHL)
8	153	Rob Polman-Tuin	Canada	Michigan Tech Huskies (WCHA)
9	174	Lars-Gunnar Pettersson	Sweden	IF Björklöven (Elitserien)
