= 1980–81 St. Louis Blues season =

National Hockey League team season

1980–81 St. Louis Blues
- Smythe Division champions
- Division: 1st Smythe
- Conference: 2nd Campbell
- 1980–81 record: 45–18–17
- Home record: 29–7–4
- Road record: 16–11–13
- Goals for: 352
- Goals against: 281

Team information
- General manager: Emile Francis
- Coach: Red Berenson
- Captain: Brian Sutter
- Alternate captains: None
- Arena: Checkerdome

Team leaders
- Goals: Wayne Babych (54)
- Assists: Bernie Federko (73)
- Points: Bernie Federko (104)
- Penalty minutes: Brian Sutter (232)
- Wins: Mike Liut (33)
- Goals against average: Mike Liut (3.35)

The 1980–81 St. Louis Blues season was the 14th for the franchise in St. Louis, Missouri. The Blues won the Smythe Division for the first time in four seasons, with a record of 45 wins, 18 losses and 17 ties, good for 107 points, and second place overall in the entire NHL. This was the first time that the Blues had ever accumulated 100 or more points in a season. The Blues defeated the Pittsburgh Penguins in a five-game preliminary round, before losing the quarter-finals in six games to the New York Rangers.

== Regular season ==
=== Final standings ===
Smythe Division
	GP	W	L	T	GF	GA	Pts
**St. Louis Blues**	80	45	18	17	352	281	107
**Chicago Black Hawks**	80	31	33	16	304	315	78
**Vancouver Canucks**	80	28	32	20	289	301	76
**Edmonton Oilers**	80	29	35	16	328	327	74
Colorado Rockies	80	22	45	13	258	344	57
Winnipeg Jets	80	9	57	14	246	400	32

Note: GP = Games played, W = Wins, L = Losses, T = Ties, Pts = Points, GF = Goals for, GA = Goals against
Note: Teams that qualified for the playoffs are highlighted in bold.

League standings
R		Div	GP	W	L	T	GF	GA	Pts
1	**p – New York Islanders**	PTK	80	48	18	14	355	260	110
2	**x – St. Louis Blues**	SMY	80	45	18	17	352	281	107
3	**y – Montreal Canadiens**	NRS	80	45	22	13	332	232	103
4	**Los Angeles Kings**	NRS	80	43	24	13	337	290	99
5	**x – Buffalo Sabres**	ADM	80	39	20	21	327	250	99
6	**Philadelphia Flyers**	PTK	80	41	24	15	313	249	97
7	**Calgary Flames**	PTK	80	39	27	14	329	298	92
8	**Boston Bruins**	ADM	80	37	30	13	316	272	87
9	**Minnesota North Stars**	ADM	80	35	28	17	291	263	87
10	**Chicago Black Hawks**	SMY	80	31	33	16	304	315	78
11	**Quebec Nordiques**	ADM	80	30	32	18	314	318	78
12	**Vancouver Canucks**	SMY	80	28	32	20	289	301	76
13	**New York Rangers**	PTK	80	30	36	14	312	317	74
14	**Edmonton Oilers**	SMY	80	29	35	16	328	327	74
15	**Pittsburgh Penguins**	NRS	80	30	37	13	302	345	73
16	**Toronto Maple Leafs**	ADM	80	28	37	15	322	367	71
17	Washington Capitals	PTK	80	26	36	18	286	317	70
18	Hartford Whalers	NRS	80	21	41	18	292	372	60
19	Colorado Rockies	SMY	80	22	45	13	258	344	57
20	Detroit Red Wings	NRS	80	19	43	18	252	339	56
21	Winnipeg Jets	SMY	80	9	57	14	246	400	32

Divisions: ADM – Adams, NRS – Norris, PTK – Patrick, SMY – Smythe

bold – The top 16 teams in the league qualified for the playoffs, regardless of division or conference.
x – Won division; y – Won Conference (and division); p – Won Presidents' Trophy (and conference and division)

=== Record vs. opponents ===
Smythe Division record vs. opponents

==== Vs. Campbell Conference ====
**Vs. Smythe Division**

1980–81 NHL records
Team	**CHI**	**COL**	**EDM**	**STL**	**VAN**	**WIN**	**Total**
Chicago	—	2−2	1−3	1−2−1	2−2	3−1	9−10−1
Colorado	2−2	—	3−0−1	1−3	0−2−2	1−2−1	7−9−4
Edmonton	3−1	0−3−1	—	1−2−1	2−2	4−0	10−8−2
St. Louis	2−1−1	3−1	2−1−1	—	4−0	2−0−2	13−3−4
Vancouver	2−2	2−0−2	2−2	0−4	—	2−0−2	8−8−4
Winnipeg	1−3	2−1−1	0−4	0−2−2	0−2−2	—	3−12−5

**Vs. Patrick Division**

1980–81 NHL records
Team	**CGY**	**NYI**	**NYR**	**PHI**	**WSH**	**Total**
Chicago	1−0−3	0−4	1−2−1	1−1−2	1−1−2	4−8−8
Colorado	3−1	1−3	3−1	0−4	0−3−1	7−12−1
Edmonton	1−2−1	0−2−2	1−2−1	2−2	1−2−1	5−10−5
St. Louis	2−2	0−2−2	4−0	0−3−1	2−0−2	8−7−5
Vancouver	1−3	1−3	1−2−1	2−1−1	1−1−2	6−10−4
Winnipeg	0−3−1	0−3−1	1−3	1−3	0−3−1	2−15−3

**Vs. Wales Conference**

**Vs. Adams Division**

1980–81 NHL records
Team	**BOS**	**BUF**	**MIN**	**QUE**	**TOR**	**Total**
Chicago	1−3	2−2	2−2	3−0−1	1−2−1	9−9−2
Colorado	1−2−1	0−3−1	1−2−1	2−2	1−1−2	5−10−5
Edmonton	1−3	1−1−2	1−2−1	1−3	2−1−1	6−10−4
St. Louis	3−1	3−0−1	1−2−1	2−1−1	3−1	12−5−3
Vancouver	2−2	1−1−2	1−2−1	1−1−2	3−0−1	8−6−6
Winnipeg	0−2−2	0−4	0−4	1−1−2	2−2	3−13−4

**Vs. Norris Division**

1980–81 NHL records
Team	**DET**	**HFD**	**LAK**	**MTL**	**PIT**	**Total**
Chicago	1−1−2	3−0−1	0−2−2	2−2	3−1	9−6−5
Colorado	1−2−1	1−2−1	0−3−1	0−4	1−3	3−14−3
Edmonton	2−1−1	2−1−1	0−2−2	2−2	2−1−1	8−7−5
St. Louis	4−0	3−0−1	2−0−2	1−1−2	2−2	12−3−5
Vancouver	2−1−1	1−1−2	0−4	0−2−2	3−0−1	6−8−6
Winnipeg	0−3−1	0−3−1	0−4	1−3	0−4	1−17−2

== Schedule and results ==
1980–81 regular season
October

Game	Result	Date	Score	Opponent	Record
1	W	October 9, 1980	8–6	Hartford Whalers (1980–81)	1–0–0
2	L	October 11, 1980	1–5	Philadelphia Flyers (1980–81)	1–1–0
3	T	October 14, 1980	5–5	@ New York Islanders (1980–81)	1–1–1
4	W	October 15, 1980	2–1	@ New York Rangers (1980–81)	2–1–1
5	W	October 18, 1980	3–2	Boston Bruins (1980–81)	3–1–1
6	W	October 21, 1980	4–3	Montreal Canadiens (1980–81)	4–1–1
7	L	October 22, 1980	3–9	@ Pittsburgh Penguins (1980–81)	4–2–1
8	W	October 24, 1980	3–2	@ Washington Capitals (1980–81)	5–2–1
9	T	October 25, 1980	3–3	Washington Capitals (1980–81)	5–2–2
10	W	October 28, 1980	5–4	New York Rangers (1980–81)	6–2–2
11	T	October 29, 1980	2–2	@ Minnesota North Stars (1980–81)	6–2–3

November

Game	Result	Date	Score	Opponent	Record
12	L	November 1, 1980	2–3	Calgary Flames (1980–81)	6–3–3
13	W	November 2, 1980	5–3	@ Chicago Black Hawks (1980–81)	7–3–3
14	W	November 5, 1980	6–1	Hartford Whalers (1980–81)	8–3–3
15	L	November 8, 1980	2–4	@ Calgary Flames (1980–81)	8–4–3
16	W	November 9, 1980	6–4	@ Edmonton Oilers (1980–81)	9–4–3
17	W	November 11, 1980	8–2	@ Vancouver Canucks (1980–81)	10–4–3
18	L	November 14, 1980	1–5	@ Colorado Rockies (1980–81)	10–5–3
19	W	November 15, 1980	5–3	@ Los Angeles Kings (1980–81)	11–5–3
20	L	November 18, 1980	2–7	New York Islanders (1980–81)	11–6–3
21	W	November 22, 1980	6–2	Detroit Red Wings (1980–81)	12–6–3
22	W	November 25, 1980	5–3	Buffalo Sabres (1980–81)	13–6–3
23	W	November 26, 1980	6–4	@ Toronto Maple Leafs (1980–81)	14–6–3
24	T	November 28, 1980	1–1	@ Winnipeg Jets (1980–81)	14–6–4
25	W	November 29, 1980	9–3	Calgary Flames (1980–81)	15–6–4

December

Game	Result	Date	Score	Opponent	Record
26	W	December 2, 1980	5–2	Quebec Nordiques (1980–81)	16–6–4
27	W	December 6, 1980	5–2	Winnipeg Jets (1980–81)	17–6–4
28	W	December 9, 1980	4–1	Minnesota North Stars (1980–81)	18–6–4
29	L	December 11, 1980	2–5	Chicago Black Hawks (1980–81)	18–7–4
30	W	December 13, 1980	9–4	Colorado Rockies (1980–81)	19–7–4
31	L	December 14, 1980	4–5	@ Philadelphia Flyers (1980–81)	19–8–4
32	L	December 17, 1980	1–4	@ Quebec Nordiques (1980–81)	19–9–4
33	W	December 18, 1980	7–3	@ Boston Bruins (1980–81)	20–9–4
34	W	December 20, 1980	5–2	Winnipeg Jets (1980–81)	21–9–4
35	W	December 23, 1980	6–3	Pittsburgh Penguins (1980–81)	22–9–4
36	T	December 27, 1980	4–4	@ Los Angeles Kings (1980–81)	22–9–5
37	W	December 28, 1980	3–2	@ Vancouver Canucks (1980–81)	23–9–5
38	W	December 30, 1980	5–3	Toronto Maple Leafs (1980–81)	24–9–5

January

Game	Result	Date	Score	Opponent	Record
39	W	January 3, 1981	6–3	Vancouver Canucks (1980–81)	25–9–5
40	W	January 6, 1981	6–3	Quebec Nordiques (1980–81)	26–9–5
41	T	January 8, 1981	5–5	@ Philadelphia Flyers (1980–81)	26–9–6
42	T	January 10, 1981	6–6	Los Angeles Kings (1980–81)	26–9–7
43	W	January 12, 1981	5–2	@ Hartford Whalers (1980–81)	27–9–7
44	L	January 14, 1981	3–6	@ Pittsburgh Penguins (1980–81)	27–10–7
45	W	January 17, 1981	7–6	Edmonton Oilers (1980–81)	28–10–7
46	T	January 21, 1981	6–6	@ Hartford Whalers (1980–81)	28–10–8
47	L	January 22, 1981	3–7	@ Boston Bruins (1980–81)	28–11–8
48	W	January 24, 1981	4–2	Chicago Black Hawks (1980–81)	29–11–8
49	W	January 27, 1981	7–1	Pittsburgh Penguins (1980–81)	30–11–8
50	L	January 31, 1981	2–3	Philadelphia Flyers (1980–81)	30–12–8

February

Game	Result	Date	Score	Opponent	Record
51	W	February 1, 1981	4–1	@ Detroit Red Wings (1980–81)	31–12–8
52	T	February 3, 1981	3–3	Edmonton Oilers (1980–81)	31–12–9
53	W	February 5, 1981	8–4	Toronto Maple Leafs (1980–81)	32–12–9
54	W	February 7, 1981	9–2	Vancouver Canucks (1980–81)	33–12–9
55	T	February 8, 1981	3–3	@ Buffalo Sabres (1980–81)	33–12–10
56	T	February 12, 1981	3–3	@ Montreal Canadiens (1980–81)	33–12–11
57	T	February 14, 1981	1–1	@ New York Islanders (1980–81)	33–12–12
58	W	February 15, 1981	5–4	@ New York Rangers (1980–81)	34–12–12
59	W	February 17, 1981	5–2	@ Calgary Flames (1980–81)	35–12–12
60	L	February 18, 1981	2–9	@ Edmonton Oilers (1980–81)	35–13–12
61	W	February 21, 1981	4–1	Colorado Rockies (1980–81)	36–13–12
62	T	February 24, 1981	2–2	Montreal Canadiens (1980–81)	36–13–13
63	W	February 25, 1981	3–2	@ Detroit Red Wings (1980–81)	37–13–13
64	W	February 28, 1981	7–4	Washington Capitals (1980–81)	38–13–13

March

Game	Result	Date	Score	Opponent	Record
65	T	March 1, 1981	4–4	@ Chicago Black Hawks (1980–81)	38–13–14
66	W	March 3, 1981	4–2	Boston Bruins (1980–81)	39–13–14
67	W	March 7, 1981	7–2	New York Rangers (1980–81)	40–13–14
68	W	March 8, 1981	7–0	@ Colorado Rockies (1980–81)	41–13–14
69	T	March 11, 1981	5–5	@ Quebec Nordiques (1980–81)	41–13–15
70	L	March 12, 1981	3–4	@ Montreal Canadiens (1980–81)	41–14–15
71	W	March 14, 1981	5–3	Detroit Red Wings (1980–81)	42–14–15
72	L	March 18, 1981	2–6	@ Toronto Maple Leafs (1980–81)	42–15–15
73	T	March 21, 1981	3–3	@ Washington Capitals (1980–81)	42–15–16
74	W	March 22, 1981	6–5	@ Buffalo Sabres (1980–81)	43–15–16
75	L	March 24, 1981	3–5	New York Islanders (1980–81)	43–16–16
76	W	March 28, 1981	7–4	Buffalo Sabres (1980–81)	44–16–16
77	L	March 31, 1981	3–6	@ Minnesota North Stars (1980–81)	44–17–16

April

Game	Result	Date	Score	Opponent	Record
78	W	April 2, 1981	6–4	Los Angeles Kings (1980–81)	45–17–16
79	L	April 4, 1981	0–5	Minnesota North Stars (1980–81)	45–18–16
80	T	April 5, 1981	5–5	@ Winnipeg Jets (1980–81)	45–18–17

Legend: Win (2 points) Loss (0 points) Tie (1 point)

== Playoffs ==
Preliminary vs. Pittsburgh Penguins

April 8	Pittsburgh Penguins	2–4	St. Louis Blues	Checkerdome	Recap
Greg Malone (1) – 00:15		First period	04:48 – pp – Mike Zuke (1); 15:58 – Tony Currie (1)
Rod Schutt (1) – 13:21		Second period	14:44 – Jorgen Pettersson (1)
No scoring		Third period	19:59 – en – Mike Crombeen (1)
Greg Millen 44 saves / 47 shots		Goalie stats	Mike Liut 24 saves / 26 shots

April 9	Pittsburgh Penguins	6–4	St. Louis Blues	Checkerdome	Recap
No scoring		First period	02:35 – pp – Joe Micheletti (1)
Randy Carlyle (1) – 02:03; Gregg Sheppard (1) – 04:58; Mario Faubert (1) – pp – 06:59; George Ferguson (1) – 11:13		Second period	03:11 – Tony Currie (2)
Rod Schutt (2) – 00:35; Randy Carlyle (2) – 03:06		Third period	10:49 – Blair Chapman (1); 16:04 – pp – Bernie Federko (1)
Greg Millen 19 saves / 23 shots		Goalie stats	Mike Liut 24 saves / 30 shots

April 11	St. Louis Blues	5–4	Pittsburgh Penguins	Pittsburgh Civic Arena	Recap
Brian Sutter (1) – pp – 11:51		First period	07:04 – pp – Rod Schutt (3)
Ralph Klassen (1) – 06:36; Wayne Babych (1) – 09:58; Bernie Federko (2) – pp – 14:38		Second period	08:57 – Mike Bullard (1); 10:31 – Mark Johnson (1)
Bernie Federko (3) – 15:54		Third period	05:08 – pp – Gregg Sheppard (2)
Mike Liut 27 saves / 31 shots		Goalie stats	Greg Millen 27 saves / 32 shots

April 12	St. Louis Blues	3–6	Pittsburgh Penguins	Pittsburgh Civic Arena	Recap
Ralph Klassen (2) – 05:53; Mike Zuke (2) – pp – 07:10		First period	14:52 – pp – Mike Bullard (2)
Mike Zuke (3) – pp – 13:55		Second period	07:45 – pp – Mark Johnson (2); 11:49 – sh – Randy Carlyle (3)
No scoring		Third period	00:44 – Mike Bullard (3); 09:21 – Randy Carlyle (4); 14:02 – Pat Price (1)
Mike Liut 28 saves / 34 shots		Goalie stats	Greg Millen 21 saves / 24 shots

April 14	Pittsburgh Penguins	3–4	2OT	St. Louis Blues	Checkerdome	Recap
Paul Gardner (1) – pp – 07:48		First period		No scoring
George Ferguson (2) – 15:06		Second period		11:17 – Brian Sutter (2); 16:06 – pp – Bernie Federko (4)
Greg Malone (2) – 10:36		Third period		03:34 – Rick Lapointe (1)
No scoring		Second overtime period		05:16 – Mike Crombeen (2)
Greg Millen 48 saves / 52 shots		Goalie stats		Mike Liut 48 saves / 51 shots

St. Louis won series 3–2

Quarterfinals vs. New York Rangers

April 16	New York Rangers	3–6	St. Louis Blues	Checkerdome	Recap
Lance Nethery (2) – 07:21		First period	11:15 – pp – Bernie Federko (5); 14:55 – Brian Sutter (3); 17:39 – Blair Chapman (2)
Lance Nethery (3) – 01:34		Second period	08:56 – Mike Crombeen (3); 16:42 – Bernie Federko (6); 19:42 – Mike Zuke (4)
Jere Gillis (1) – 05:39		Third period	No scoring
Steve Baker 22 saves / 28 shots		Goalie stats	Mike Liut 28 saves / 31 shots

April 17	New York Rangers	6–4	St. Louis Blues	Checkerdome	Recap
Barry Beck (2)– sh – 03:07		First period	01:22 – Jorgen Pettersson (2); 02:16 – Larry Patey (1); 18:06 – pp – Brian Sutter (4)
Dean Talafous (2) – 16:24		Second period	No scoring
Jere Gillis (2) – 07:30; Anders Hedberg (4) – ps – 08:29; Mike Allison (2) – 10:16; Ron Duguay (6) – 19:13		Third period	15:04 – Brian Sutter (5)
Steve Baker 25 saves / 29 shots		Goalie stats	Mike Liut 24 saves / 30 shots

April 19	St. Louis Blues	3–6	New York Rangers	Madison Square Garden	Recap
Wayne Babych (2) – pp – 02:47		First period	00:40 – Ron Greschner (2)
Bill Stewart (1) – 15:35		Second period	05:13 – pp – Ulf Nilsson (6); 06:41 – Barry Beck (3); 13:49 – pp – Mike Allison (3); 17:36 – Steve Vickers (1)
Tony Currie (3) – 00:34		Third period	02:23 – Lance Nethery (4)
Mike Liut 25 saves / 31 shots		Goalie stats	Steve Baker 14 saves / 17 shots

April 20	St. Louis Blues	1–4	New York Rangers	Madison Square Garden	Recap
Tony Currie (4) – pp – 07:40		First period	06:14 – Anders Hedberg (4); 18:37 – Ron Duguay (7)
No scoring		Second period	09:01 – pp – Steve Vickers (2)
No scoring		Third period	03:24 – Steve Vickers (3)
Mike Liut 24 saves / 28 shots		Goalie stats	Steve Baker 33 saves / 34 shots

April 22	New York Rangers	3–4	St. Louis Blues	Checkerdome	Recap
Ron Greschner (3) – 06:35; Ulf Nilsson (7) – pp – 10:06		First period	14:17 – pp – Brian Sutter (6)
Carol Vadnais (1) – 02:54		Second period	08:25 – Larry Patey (2); 14:55 – Jorgen Pettersson (3)
No scoring		Third period	06:09 – pp – Jorgen Pettersson (4)
Steve Baker 26 saves / 30 shots		Goalie stats	Mike Liut 34 saves / 37 shots

April 24	St. Louis Blues	4–7	New York Rangers	Madison Square Garden	Recap
No scoring		First period	03:27 – Steve Vickers (4); 05:49 – Anders Hedberg (6); 16:10 – sh – Ron Duguay (8)
Bernie Federko (7) – 02:16; Rick Lapointe (2) – 03:14; Bernie Federko (8) – 04:06		Second period	01:59 – Barry Beck (4); 17:03 – Lance Nethery (5)
Ed Kea (1) – 06:00		Third period	04:31 – Peter Wallin (1); 14:54 – Ulf Nilsson (8)
Mike Liut 13 saves / 20 shots		Goalie stats	Steve Baker 11 saves / 15 shots

New York won series 4–2

== Player statistics ==
=== Regular season ===
Scoring

Player	Pos	GP	G	A	Pts	PIM	+/-	PPG	SHG	GWG
Bernie Federko	C	78	31	73	104	47	9	9	2	4
Wayne Babych	RW	78	54	42	96	93	14	14	0	7
Blake Dunlop	C	80	20	67	87	40	16	6	0	2
Jorgen Pettersson	LW	62	37	36	73	24	14	8	0	5
Brian Sutter	LW	78	35	34	69	232	12	17	0	4
Mike Zuke	C	74	24	44	68	57	15	10	1	1
Perry Turnbull	C	75	34	22	56	209	15	5	0	5
Tony Currie	RW	61	23	32	55	38	32	2	0	4
Blair Chapman	RW	55	20	26	46	41	3	5	0	3
Larry Patey	C	80	22	23	45	107	2	0	8	3
Rick Lapointe	D	80	8	25	33	124	36	0	0	3
Joe Micheletti	D	63	4	27	31	53	12	3	0	1
Jack Brownschidle	D	71	5	23	28	12	5	3	1	1
Mike Crombeen	RW	66	9	14	23	58	1	0	1	1
Bill Stewart	D	60	2	21	23	114	19	0	0	0
Ed Kea	D	74	3	18	21	60	15	0	0	0
Ralph Klassen	C	66	6	12	18	23	-5	0	1	0
Craig Norwich	D	23	4	12	16	14	1	3	0	1
Gerry Hart	D	63	4	11	15	132	9	0	0	0
Bryan Maxwell	D	40	3	10	13	137	7	0	0	0
Hartland Monahan	RW	25	4	2	6	4	2	0	2	0
Ed Staniowski	G	19	0	2	2	0	0	0	0	0
Rick Heinz	G	4	0	1	1	0	0	0	0	0
Bob Hess	D	4	0	0	0	4	-3	0	0	0
Dick Lamby	D	1	0	0	0	0	-1	0	0	0
Chuck Lefley	LW	2	0	0	0	0	0	0	0	0
Mike Liut	G	61	0	0	0	0	0	0	0	0
Paul MacLean	RW	1	0	0	0	0	1	0	0	0

Goaltending

Player	MIN	GP	W	L	T	GA	GAA	SO
Mike Liut	3570	61	33	14	13	199	3.34	1
Ed Staniowski	1010	19	10	3	3	72	4.28	0
Rick Heinz	220	4	2	1	1	8	2.18	0
Team:	4800	80	45	18	17	279	3.49	1

=== Playoffs ===
Scoring

Player	Pos	GP	G	A	Pts	PIM	PPG	SHG	GWG
Bernie Federko	C	11	8	10	18	2	4	0	1
Tony Currie	RW	11	4	12	16	4	1	0	0
Joe Micheletti	D	11	1	11	12	10	1	0	0
Brian Sutter	LW	11	6	3	9	77	3	0	0
Mike Zuke	C	11	4	5	9	4	3	0	0
Jorgen Pettersson	LW	11	4	3	7	0	1	0	2
Blair Chapman	RW	9	2	5	7	6	0	0	0
Larry Patey	C	11	2	4	6	30	0	0	0
Rick Lapointe	D	8	2	2	4	12	0	0	0
Mike Crombeen	RW	11	3	0	3	8	0	0	2
Ed Kea	D	11	1	2	3	12	0	0	0
Jack Brownschidle	D	11	0	3	3	2	0	0	0
Blake Dunlop	C	11	0	3	3	4	0	0	0
Wayne Babych	RW	11	2	0	2	8	1	0	0
Ralph Klassen	C	11	2	0	2	2	0	0	0
Bill Stewart	D	4	1	0	1	11	0	0	0
Bryan Maxwell	D	11	0	1	1	54	0	0	0
Gerry Hart	D	10	0	0	0	27	0	0	0
Mike Liut	G	11	0	0	0	0	0	0	0
Paul MacLean	RW	1	0	0	0	0	0	0	0
Hartland Monahan	RW	1	0	0	0	4	0	0	0

Goaltending

Player	MIN	GP	W	L	GA	GAA	SO
Mike Liut	685	11	5	6	50	4.38	0
Team:	685	11	5	6	50	4.38	0

Note:

Pos = Position;GP = Games played; G = Goals; A = Assists; Pts = Points; PIM = Penalty minutes; +/- = Plus/minus; PPG = Power-play goals; SHG = Short-handed goals; GWG = Game-winning goals
Pos = Position;GP = Games played; Min, TOI = Minutes played; W = Wins; L = Losses; T,T/OT = Ties; OTL = Overtime losses; GA = Goals-against; GAA = Goals-against average; SO = Shutouts; SA = Shots against; SV = Shots saved;SV% = Save percentage;

== Transactions ==
The Blues were involved in the following transactions during the 1980–81 season.

=== Trades ===
June 19, 1980	To St. Louis Blues Craig Norwich	To Winnipeg Jets Rick Bowness
October 30, 1980	To St. Louis Blues Bill Stewart	To Buffalo Sabres Bob Hess; 4th-round pick in 1981 – Anders Wikberg

=== Waivers ===
February 2, 1981	To Colorado Rockies Craig Norwich

=== Free agent signings ===
May 8, 1980	From Västra Frölunda IF (Sweden) Jörgen Pettersson
July 14, 1980	From Adirondack Red Wings (AHL) John Taft
November 12, 1980	From Quebec Nordiques Gerry Hart

== Draft picks ==
St. Louis's draft picks at the 1980 NHL entry draft held at the Montreal Forum in Montreal.

Round	#	Player	Nationality	College/Junior/Club team (League)
1	12	Rik Wilson	United States	Kingston Canadians (OHA)
3	54	Jim Pavese	United States	Kitchener Rangers (OHA)
4	75	Bob Brooke	United States	Yale University (ECAC)
5	96	Alain Lemieux	Canada	Chicoutimi Saguenéens (QMJHL)
6	117	Perry Anderson	Canada	Kingston Canadians (OMJHL)
7	138	Roger Hagglund	Sweden	Umeå (Sweden)
8	159	Pat Rabbitt	Canada	Billings Bighorns (WHL)
9	180	Peter Lindgren	Sweden	Hammarby (Sweden)
10	201	John Smyth	Canada	Calgary Wranglers (WHL)

== See also ==
- 1980–81 NHL season
