= Ron Loustel =

Canadian ice hockey player

- Born: March 7, 1962 (age 63) Winnipeg, Manitoba, Canada
- Height: 6 ft 0 in (183 cm)
- Weight: 185 lb (84 kg; 13 st 3 lb)
- Position: Goaltender
- Caught: Left
- Played for: Winnipeg Jets
- NHL draft: 6th round, 107th overall, 1980; Winnipeg Jets
- Playing career: 1980–1983

Ronald David Loustel (born March 7, 1962) is a Canadian former professional ice hockey goaltender who played in one National Hockey League (NHL) game for the Winnipeg Jets during the 1980–81 NHL season. He has the stigma of having allowed more goals than any other goaltender who only appeared in one NHL game. He allowed 10 goals on 51 shots (41 saves, 80.4 SV%) in a 10–2 loss to the Vancouver Canucks in his sole career NHL game on March 27, 1981. He has also played for the Kelowna Buckaroos, Saskatoon Blades, Tulsa Oilers, Brandon Wheat Kings, and Fort Wayne Komets.

== Playing career ==
General manager John Ferguson Sr., facing severe goaltending woes, called up Loustel from the Saskatoon Blades of the Western Hockey League (WHL), hoping he would be the solution. In his only NHL appearance against the Vancouver Canucks, while he made 41 saves, the Canucks got 51 shots on goal, giving him 10 goals against (GA). Since he never played another NHL game, he currently holds the record of having the most GA of any goalie who played only 1 NHL game.

== Career statistics ==
=== Regular season and playoffs ===
			Regular season									Playoffs
Season	Team	League	GP	W	L	T	MIN	GA	SO	GAA	SV%	GP	W	L	MIN	GA	SO	GAA	SV%
1978–79	Kelowna Buckaroos	BCJHL	44	22	19	2	2493	203	0	4.88	.872	—	—	—	—	—	—	—	—
1979–80	Saskatoon Blades	WHL	41	13	20	3	2203	181	0	4.93	.872	—	—	—	—	—	—	—	—
1980–81	Saskatoon Blades	WHL	55	15	31	2	2932	278	0	5.69	.854	—	—	—	—	—	—	—	—
1980–81	Winnipeg Jets	NHL	1	0	1	0	60	10	0	10.00	.804	—	—	—	—	—	—	—	—
1980–81	Tulsa Oilers	CHL	1	0	1	0	29	5	0	10.34	.737	—	—	—	—	—	—	—	—
1981–82	Saskatoon Blades	WHL	42	27	11	1	2280	172	0	4.53	.871	—	—	—	—	—	—	—	—
1982–83	Brandon Wheat Kings	WHL	28	7	20	0	1627	192	0	7.08	.833	—	—	—	—	—	—	—	—
1982–83	Fort Wayne Komets	IHL	1	—	—	—	33	3	0	5.45	—	—	—	—	—	—	—	—	—
NHL totals			1	0	1	0	60	10	0	10.00	.804	—	—	—	—	—	—	—	—

== See also ==
- List of players who played only one game in the NHL
