= Dave Chartier =

Canadian ice hockey player

- Born: February 15, 1961 (age 65) St. Lazare, Manitoba, Canada
- Height: 5 ft 9 in (175 cm)
- Weight: 170 lb (77 kg; 12 st 2 lb)
- Position: Centre
- Shot: Right
- Played for: Winnipeg Jets
- NHL draft: 191st overall, 1980; Winnipeg Jets
- Playing career: 1981–1984

Dave Chartier (born February 15, 1961) is a Canadian former professional ice hockey player.

Born in St. Lazare, Manitoba, Chartier was drafted 191st overall by the Winnipeg Jets in the 1980 NHL entry draft from the Brandon Wheat Kings.

During the 1981–82 season, he was called up for one game for the Jets and one game for the Central Hockey League's Tulsa Oilers where he scored one goal and also featured in the Oilers' playoff run that season. Another season in Tulsa followed before two years in the American Hockey League with the Sherbrooke Jets. At the end of the 1983–84 season, the 23-year-old Chartier retired from hockey.

== Career statistics ==
=== Regular season and playoffs ===
			Regular season					Playoffs
Season	Team	League	GP	G	A	Pts	PIM	GP	G	A	Pts	PIM
1977–78	Brandon Travellers	MJHL	47	30	22	52	98	—	—	—	—	—
1977–78	Brandon Wheat Kings	WHL	2	1	0	1	0	—	—	—	—	—
1978–79	Brandon Wheat Kings	WHL	48	14	12	26	83	10	3	0	3	12
1978–79	Brandon Wheat Kings	M-Cup	—	—	—	—	—	5	0	0	0	2
1979–80	Brandon Wheat Kings	WHL	69	39	29	68	285	11	8	5	13	65
1980–81	Brandon Wheat Kings	WHL	69	64	60	124	295	—	—	—	—	—
1980–81	Winnipeg Jets	NHL	1	0	0	0	0	—	—	—	—	—
1980–81	Tulsa Oilers	CHL	1	1	0	1	4	8	1	2	3	9
1981–82	Tulsa Oilers	CHL	74	18	17	35	126	3	0	1	1	2
1982–83	Sherbrooke Jets	AHL	48	9	10	19	87	—	—	—	—	—
1983–84	Sherbrooke Jets	AHL	43	13	14	27	59	—	—	—	—	—
NHL totals			1	0	0	0	0	—	—	—	—	v

== See also ==
- List of players who played only one game in the NHL
