= 1980–81 New York Rangers season =

NHL hockey team season

1980–81 New York Rangers
- Division: 4th Patrick
- Conference: T-7th Campbell
- 1980–81 record: 30–36–14
- Home record: 17–13–10
- Road record: 13–23–4
- Goals for: 312
- Goals against: 317

Team information
- General manager: Fred Shero; Craig Patrick
- Coach: Fred Shero; Craig Patrick
- Captain: Walt Tkaczuk
- Alternate captains: None
- Arena: Madison Square Garden
- Average attendance: 17,293

Team leaders
- Goals: Ed Johnstone/Anders Hedberg (30)
- Assists: Ron Greschner (41)
- Points: Anders Hedberg (70)
- Penalty minutes: Barry Beck (231)
- Wins: Doug Soetaert (16)
- Goals against average: Steve Weeks (2.00)

The 1980–81 New York Rangers season was the franchise's 55th season. In the regular season, the Rangers finished in fourth place in the Patrick Division with 74 points and earned a berth in the playoffs. New York won series with the Los Angeles Kings and St. Louis Blues to reach the NHL semi-finals, where the team was defeated by the New York Islanders in a four-game sweep.

== Regular season ==
Fred Shero, citing a drinking problem, chose to resign as coach. Craig Patrick, the Rangers' director of operations, replaced him. Craig Patrick became the third generation of the Patrick family to coach the Rangers, after Lester Patrick, Lynn Patrick and Muzz Patrick.

Halfway through the season, veteran Phil Esposito decided to retire. He retired after 18 seasons, the last six with the Rangers. He finished his career with 717 goals and 1,590 points.

=== Final standings ===
Patrick Division
	GP	W	L	T	GF	GA	Pts
**New York Islanders**	80	48	18	14	355	260	110
**Philadelphia Flyers**	80	41	24	15	313	249	97
**Calgary Flames**	80	39	27	14	329	298	92
**New York Rangers**	80	30	36	14	312	317	74
Washington Capitals	80	26	36	18	286	317	70

Note: GP = Games played, W = Wins, L = Losses, T = Ties, Pts = Points, GF = Goals for, GA = Goals against
Note: Teams that qualified for the playoffs are highlighted in bold.

League standings
R		Div	GP	W	L	T	GF	GA	Pts
1	**p – New York Islanders**	PTK	80	48	18	14	355	260	110
2	**x – St. Louis Blues**	SMY	80	45	18	17	352	281	107
3	**y – Montreal Canadiens**	NRS	80	45	22	13	332	232	103
4	**Los Angeles Kings**	NRS	80	43	24	13	337	290	99
5	**x – Buffalo Sabres**	ADM	80	39	20	21	327	250	99
6	**Philadelphia Flyers**	PTK	80	41	24	15	313	249	97
7	**Calgary Flames**	PTK	80	39	27	14	329	298	92
8	**Boston Bruins**	ADM	80	37	30	13	316	272	87
9	**Minnesota North Stars**	ADM	80	35	28	17	291	263	87
10	**Chicago Black Hawks**	SMY	80	31	33	16	304	315	78
11	**Quebec Nordiques**	ADM	80	30	32	18	314	318	78
12	**Vancouver Canucks**	SMY	80	28	32	20	289	301	76
13	**New York Rangers**	PTK	80	30	36	14	312	317	74
14	**Edmonton Oilers**	SMY	80	29	35	16	328	327	74
15	**Pittsburgh Penguins**	NRS	80	30	37	13	302	345	73
16	**Toronto Maple Leafs**	ADM	80	28	37	15	322	367	71
17	Washington Capitals	PTK	80	26	36	18	286	317	70
18	Hartford Whalers	NRS	80	21	41	18	292	372	60
19	Colorado Rockies	SMY	80	22	45	13	258	344	57
20	Detroit Red Wings	NRS	80	19	43	18	252	339	56
21	Winnipeg Jets	SMY	80	9	57	14	246	400	32

Divisions: ADM – Adams, NRS – Norris, PTK – Patrick, SMY – Smythe

bold – The top 16 teams in the league qualified for the playoffs, regardless of division or conference.
x – Won division; y – Won Conference (and division); p – Won Presidents' Trophy (and conference and division)

=== Record vs. opponents ===
Patrick Division record vs. opponents

==== Vs. Campbell Conference ====
**Vs. Patrick Division**

1980–81 NHL records
Team	**CGY**	**NYI**	**NYR**	**PHI**	**WSH**	**Total**
Calgary	—	1−1−2	2−1−1	2−2	3−1	**8−5−3**
N.Y. Islanders	1−1−2	—	2−2	1−2−1	4−0	**8−5−3**
N.Y. Rangers	1−2−1	2−2	—	1−1−2	2−2	**6−7−3**
Philadelphia	2−2	2−1−1	1−1−2	—	2−2	**7−6−3**
Washington	1−3	0−4	2−2	2−2	—	**5−11−0**

**Vs. Smythe Division**

1980–81 NHL records
Team	**CHI**	**COL**	**EDM**	**STL**	**VAN**	**WIN**	**Total**
Calgary	0−1−3	1−3	2−1−1	2−2	3−1	3−0−1	**11−8−5**
N.Y. Islanders	4−0	3−1	2−0−2	2−0−2	3−1	3−0−1	**17−2−5**
N.Y. Rangers	2−1−1	1−3	2−1−1	0−4	2−1−1	3−1	**10−11−3**
Philadelphia	1−1−2	4−0	2−2	3−0−1	1−2−1	3−1	**14−6−4**
Washington	1−1−2	3−0−1	2−1−1	0−2−2	1−1−2	3−0−1	**10−5−9**

**Vs. Wales Conference**

**Vs. Adams Division**

1980–81 NHL records
Team	**BOS**	**BUF**	**MIN**	**QUE**	**TOR**	**Total**
Calgary	3−1	1−2−1	2−2	1−1−2	2−2	**9−8−3**
N.Y. Islanders	2−2	2−2	2−0−2	3−1	3−1	**12−6−2**
N.Y. Rangers	2−2	1−2−1	1−1−2	1−1−2	2−2	**7−8−5**
Philadelphia	2−2	0−2−2	2−1−1	1−2−1	0−2−2	**5−9−6**
Washington	1−2−1	0−2−2	0−3−1	0−4	3−1	**4−12−4**

**Vs. Norris Division**

1980–81 NHL records
Team	**DET**	**HFD**	**LAK**	**MTL**	**PIT**	**Total**
Calgary	2−1−1	3−1	3−1	1−2−1	2−1−1	**11−6−3**
N.Y. Islanders	4−0	2−0−2	2−2	2−1−1	1−2−1	**11−5−4**
N.Y. Rangers	1−2−1	3−1	1−3	1−2−1	1−2−1	**7−10−3**
Philadelphia	3−1	3−0−1	4−0	1−2−1	4−0	**15−3−2**
Washington	2−1−1	3−1	1−2−1	0−2−2	1−2−1	**7−8−5**

== Schedule and results ==
1980–81 regular season
October: 3–7–1 (home: 2–3–0; road: 1–4–1)

Game	October	Opponent	Score	Record
1	9	@ Boston Bruins	7–2	0–1–0
2	11	@ Toronto Maple Leafs	8–3	1–1–0
3	12	Pittsburgh Penguins	6–3	1–2–0
4	15	St. Louis Blues	2–1	1–3–0
5	18	@ Washington Capitals	8–2	1–4–0
6	19	Edmonton Oilers	4–2	1–5–0
7	22	Vancouver Canucks	3–2	2–5–0
8	25	@ Detroit Red Wings	4–2	2–6–0
9	26	Detroit Red Wings	7–6	3–6–0
10	28	@ St. Louis Blues	5–4	3–7–0
11	30	@ Philadelphia Flyers	3–3	3–7–1

November: 3–7–3 (home: 2–2–2; road: 1–5–1)

Game	November	Opponent	Score	Record
12	1	@ Montreal Canadiens	7–4	3–8–1
13	2	Los Angeles Kings	6–3	3–9–1
14	5	@ Chicago Black Hawks	3–3	3–9–2
15	8	@ Vancouver Canucks	6–4	3–10–2
16	10	@ Los Angeles Kings	4–1	3–11–2
17	11	@ Calgary Flames	7–3	3–12–2
18	14	Pittsburgh Penguins	3–3	3–12–3
19	16	Hartford Whalers	7–3	4–12–3
20	19	Philadelphia Flyers	5–1	4–13–3
21	22	@ New York Islanders	6–4	4–14–3
22	23	Vancouver Canucks	2–2	4–14–4
23	26	Boston Bruins	6–4	5–14–4
24	29	@ Pittsburgh Penguins	4–2	6–14–4

December: 7–6–1 (home: 3–4–0; road: 4–2–1)

Game	December	Opponent	Score	Record
25	1	Minnesota North Stars	5–3	6–15–4
26	3	@ Winnipeg Jets	4–3	7–15–4
27	5	@ Edmonton Oilers	5–1	8–15–4
28	7	Chicago Black Hawks	5–4	9–15–4
29	10	Washington Capitals	6–2	10–15–4
30	12	@ Colorado Rockies	4–3	11–15–4
31	14	@ Chicago Black Hawks	2–1	11–16–4
32	17	Winnipeg Jets	8–2	12–16–4
33	20	@ Minnesota North Stars	3–3	12–16–5
34	22	Calgary Flames	3–2	12–17–5
35	26	@ Washington Capitals	7–3	12–18–5
36	28	Montreal Canadiens	5–2	12–19–5
37	30	@ Quebec Nordiques	6–3	13–19–5
38	31	Colorado Rockies	6–4	13–20–5

January: 6–4–3 (home: 2–1–2; road: 4–3–1)

Game	January	Opponent	Score	Record
39	2	New York Islanders	3–1	14–20–5
40	4	Quebec Nordiques	2–2	14–20–6
41	9	Buffalo Sabres	3–3	14–20–7
42	11	Toronto Maple Leafs	5–3	14–21–7
43	13	@ Calgary Flames	4–4	14–21–8
44	15	@ Colorado Rockies	4–3	14–22–8
45	18	@ Buffalo Sabres	4–0	14–23–8
46	19	Calgary Flames	6–3	15–23–8
47	21	@ Winnipeg Jets	5–1	15–24–8
48	23	@ Edmonton Oilers	7–4	16–24–8
49	24	@ Vancouver Canucks	7–5	17–24–8
50	28	@ Los Angeles Kings	6–2	18–24–8
51	31	@ Minnesota North Stars	7–3	19–24–8

February: 5–7–1 (home: 5–2–1; road: 0–5–0)

Game	February	Opponent	Score	Record
52	2	Los Angeles Kings	3–2	19–25–8
53	4	New York Islanders	9–3	20–25–8
54	5	@ Boston Bruins	6–3	20–26–8
55	8	Minnesota North Stars	3–3	20–26–9
56	12	Winnipeg Jets	8–6	21–26–9
57	14	@ Toronto Maple Leafs	6–3	21–27–9
58	15	St. Louis Blues	5–4	21–28–9
59	18	Toronto Maple Leafs	8–3	22–28–9
60	19	@ Detroit Red Wings	7–3	22–29–9
61	21	Washington Capitals	6–4	23–29–9
62	22	@ Hartford Whalers	6–5	23–30–9
63	25	Buffalo Sabres	6–3	24–30–9
64	28	@ Pittsburgh Penguins	6–4	24–31–9

March: 4–4–5 (home: 2–1–5; road: 2–2–0)

Game	March	Opponent	Score	Record
65	1	Montreal Canadiens	4–4	24–31–10
66	4	Edmonton Oilers	5–5	24–31–11
67	7	@ St. Louis Blues	7–2	24–32–11
68	8	Detroit Red Wings	4–4	24–32–12
69	10	@ Quebec Nordiques	6–4	24–33–12
70	11	Colorado Rockies	4–3	24–34–12
71	14	Hartford Whalers	6–2	25–34–12
72	18	Boston Bruins	3–2	26–34–12
73	21	@ Hartford Whalers	6–4	27–34–12
74	22	Quebec Nordiques	7–7	27–34–13
75	25	@ Buffalo Sabres	4–2	27–35–13
76	28	@ Montreal Canadiens	6–2	28–35–13
77	30	Philadelphia Flyers	0–0	28–35–14

April: 2–1–0 (home: 1–0–0; road: 1–1–0)

Game	April	Opponent	Score	Record
78	2	@ New York Islanders	2–1	28–36–14
79	3	Chicago Black Hawks	3–1	29–36–14
80	5	@ Philadelphia Flyers	2–0	30–36–14

Legend: Win (2 points) Loss (0 points) Tie (1 point)

== Playoffs ==
1981 Stanley Cup playoffs
Preliminary round vs. (4) Los Angeles Kings – Rangers win 3–1

Game	Date	Visitor	Score	Home	OT	Series
1	April 8	New York Rangers	3–1	Los Angeles Kings		New York Rangers lead series 1–0
2	April 9	New York Rangers	4–5	Los Angeles Kings		Series tied 1–1
3	April 11	Los Angeles Kings	3–10	New York Rangers		New York Rangers lead series 2–1
4	April 12	Los Angeles Kings	3–6	New York Rangers		New York Rangers win series 3–1

Quarterfinals vs. (2) St. Louis Blues – Rangers win 4–2

Game	Date	Visitor	Score	Home	OT	Series
1	April 16	New York Rangers	3–6	St. Louis Blues		St. Louis leads series 1–0
2	April 17	New York Rangers	6–4	St. Louis Blues		Series tied 1–1
3	April 19	St. Louis Blues	3–6	New York Rangers		New York Rangers lead series 2–1
4	April 20	St. Louis Blues	1–4	New York Rangers		New York Rangers lead series 3–1
5	April 22	New York Rangers	3–4	St. Louis Blues		New York Rangers lead series 3–2
6	April 24	St. Louis Blues	4–7	New York Rangers		New York Rangers win series 4–2

Semifinals vs. (1) New York Islanders – Islanders win 4–0

Game	Date	Visitor	Score	Home	OT	Series
1	April 28	New York Rangers	2–5	New York Islanders		New York Islanders lead series 1–0
2	April 30	New York Rangers	3–7	New York Islanders		New York Islanders lead series 2–0
3	May 2	New York Islanders	5–1	New York Rangers		New York Islanders lead series 3–0
4	May 5	New York Islanders	5–2	New York Rangers		New York Islanders win series 4–0

Legend: Win Loss

== Player statistics ==
Skaters

Regular season
Player	GP	G	A	Pts	+/-	PIM
Anders Hedberg	80	30	40	70	0	52
Ed Johnstone	80	30	38	68	15	100
Ron Greschner	74	27	41	68	0	112
Mike Allison	75	26	38	64	12	83
Steve Vickers	73	19	39	58	7	40
Don Maloney	61	29	23	52	17	99
Dave Maloney	79	11	36	47	24	132
Ulf Nilsson	51	14	25	39	−3	42
Ron Duguay	50	17	21	38	2	83
Barry Beck	75	11	23	34	9	231
Dean Talafous	50	13	17	30	2	28
Tom Laidlaw	80	6	23	29	0	100
Walt Tkaczuk	43	6	22	28	13	28
Dave Silk	59	14	12	26	−24	58
Lance Nethery	33	11	12	23	0	12
Carol Vadnais	74	3	20	23	19	91
Jere Gillis^{†}	35	10	10	20	6	4
Phil Esposito	41	7	13	20	−13	20
Ed Hospodar	61	5	14	19	10	214
Chris Kotsopoulos	54	4	12	16	−10	153
Nick Fotiu^{†}	27	5	6	11	−6	91
Peter Wallin	12	1	5	6	−1	2
Doug Sulliman	32	4	1	5	−9	32
Dan McCarthy	5	4	0	4	3	4
Gary Burns	11	2	2	4	−9	18
Andre Dore	15	1	3	4	−1	15
Cam Connor	15	1	3	4	6	44
Mario Marois^{‡}	8	1	2	3	−5	46
Jeff Bandura	2	0	1	1	−3	0
Tim Bothwell	3	0	1	1	0	0
Mike McDougall	2	0	0	0	1	0

Playoffs
Player	GP	G	A	Pts	PIM
Ron Duguay	14	8	9	17	16
Ulf Nilsson	14	8	8	16	23
Anders Hedberg	14	8	8	16	6
Barry Beck	14	5	8	13	32
Ron Greschner	14	4	8	12	17
Steve Vickers	12	4	7	11	14
Peter Wallin	14	2	6	8	6
Lance Nethery	14	5	3	8	9
Dean Talafous	14	3	5	8	2
Jere Gillis	14	2	5	7	9
Don Maloney	13	1	6	7	13
Tom Laidlaw	14	1	4	5	18
Carol Vadnais	14	1	3	4	26
Mike Allison	14	3	1	4	20
Ed Johnstone	8	2	2	4	4
Chris Kotsopoulos	14	0	3	3	63
Ed Hospodar	12	2	0	2	93
Dave Maloney	2	0	2	2	9
John Hughes	3	0	1	1	6
Doug Sulliman	3	1	0	1	0
Gary Burns	1	0	0	0	2
Nick Fotiu	2	0	0	0	4

Goaltenders

Regular season
Player	GP	TOI	W	L	T	GA	GAA	SO
Doug Soetaert	39	2320	16	16	7	152	3.93	0
Steve Baker	21	1260	10	6	5	73	3.48	2
John Davidson	10	560	1	7	1	48	5.14	0
Wayne Thomas	10	600	3	6	1	34	3.40	0
Steve Weeks	1	60	0	1	0	2	2.00	0

Playoffs
Player	GP	TOI	W	L	GA	GAA	SO
Steve Baker	14	826	7	7	55	4.00	0
Steve Weeks	1	14	0	0	1	4.29	0

^{†}Denotes player spent time with another team before joining Rangers. Stats reflect time with Rangers only.
^{‡}Traded mid-season. Stats reflect time with Rangers only.

Note:

Pos = Position;GP = Games played; G = Goals; A = Assists; Pts = Points; PIM = Penalty minutes; +/- = Plus/minus; PPG = Power-play goals; SHG = Short-handed goals; GWG = Game-winning goals
Pos = Position;GP = Games played; Min, TOI = Minutes played; W = Wins; L = Losses; T,T/OT = Ties; OTL = Overtime losses; GA = Goals-against; GAA = Goals-against average; SO = Shutouts; SA = Shots against; SV = Shots saved;SV% = Save percentage;

== Transactions ==
The Rangers were involved in the following transactions during the 1980–81 season.

=== Trades ===
August 6, 1980	To New York Rangers Gord Smith	To Winnipeg Jets Cash
November 11, 1980	To New York Rangers Jeff Bandura; Jere Gillis	To Vancouver Canucks Mario Marois; Jim Mayer
November 18, 1980	To New York Rangers Dale Lewis	To Calgary Flames Frank Beaton
January 15, 1981	To New York Rangers Nick Fotiu	To Hartford Whalers 5th-round pick in 1981 – Bill Maguire
March 10, 1981	To New York Rangers John Hughes	To Edmonton Oilers Ray Markham

=== Waivers ===
August 7, 1980	To Hartford Whalers Warren Miller

=== Free agent signings ===
July 10, 1980	From New Haven Nighthawks (AHL) Dan Poulin
September 16, 1980	From Boston Bruins Gary Burns
December 12, 1980	From New Haven Nighthawks (AHL) Gerry McDonald
March 8, 1981	From Djurgårdens IF (Sweden) Peter Wallin

== Draft picks ==
New York's picks at the 1980 NHL entry draft in Montreal, Canada at the Montreal Forum.

Round	#	Player	Position	Nationality	College/Junior/Club team (League)
1	14	Jim Malone	F	Canada	Toronto Marlboros (OHA)
2	35	Mike Allison	RW	Canada	Sudbury Wolves (OHA)
4	77	Kurt Kleinendorst	C	United States	Providence College (NCAA)
5	98	Scot Kleinendorst	D	United States	Providence College (NCAA)
6	119	Reijo Ruotsalainen	D	Finland	Karpat (SM-liiga)
7	140	Bob Scurfield	C	Canada	Western Michigan University (NCAA)
8	161	Bart Wilson	D	Canada	Toronto Marlboros (OHA)
9	182	Chris Wray	RW	United States	Boston College (NCAA)
10	203	Anders Backstrom	D	Sweden	Brynas (Elitserien)

== Bibliography ==
- McFarlane, Brian (1989). One hundred years of hockey. Toronto, Ontario: Deneau Publishers. ISBN 0-88879-216-6.
