= 1980–81 Chicago Black Hawks season =

National Hockey League team season

1980–81 Chicago Black Hawks
- Division: 2nd Smythe
- Conference: 5th Campbell
- 1980–81 record: 31–33–16
- Home record: 21–11–8
- Road record: 10–22–8
- Goals for: 304
- Goals against: 315

Team information
- General manager: Bob Pulford
- Coach: Keith Magnuson
- Captain: Terry Ruskowski
- Alternate captains: None
- Arena: Chicago Stadium
- Average attendance: 12,090

Team leaders
- Goals: Darryl Sutter (40)
- Assists: Tom Lysiak (55)
- Points: Tom Lysiak (76)
- Penalty minutes: Terry Ruskowski (225)
- Plus/minus: Denis Savard (+27)
- Wins: Tony Esposito (29)
- Goals against average: Tony Esposito (3.76)

The 1980–81 Chicago Black Hawks season was the 55th season of operation of the Chicago Black Hawks in the National Hockey League (NHL).

== Offseason ==
At the 1980 NHL entry draft, the Black Hawks had the third overall pick, and selected Denis Savard from the Montreal Juniors of the QMJHL. In 72 games with the Juniors, Savard had 63 goals and 181 points during the 1979–80 season.

The club replaced head coach Eddie Johnston, as former Black Hawks defenceman and captain Keith Magnuson was named the new head coach of the team. Magnuson appeared in 589 games with Chicago from 1969 to 1980.

== Regular season ==
The Black Hawks had a tough first half of the season, as the club had a record of 12-22-6 through their first 40 games, clinging on to the fourth and final playoff position in the Smythe Division. The Black Hawks then went 14–2–4 in their next 20 games, which included an eight-game winning streak, to improve their overall record to 26–24–10, and second place in the division. Chicago would finish their final 20 game stretch with a 5–9–6 record, finishing the season with a 31–33–16 record, earning 78 points, and maintaining second place in the Smythe Division, 31 points behind the division winners, the St. Louis Blues.

Offensively, Tom Lysiak led the club with 76 points, as he scored 21 goals and 55 assists. Rookie Denis Savard finished one point behind, scoring 28 goals and 75 points, while having a team best +27 rating. Darryl Sutter led the Black Hawks with 40 goals, while earning 62 points, and Reg Kerr had 30 goals and 60 points in 70 games. Terry Ruskowski chipped in with 59 points, while leading Chicago with 225 penalty minutes. On the blueline, Bob Murray led the scoring, getting 13 goals and 60 points, while Doug Wilson had 12 goals and 51 points.

In goal, Tony Esposito led the way, earning a 29–23–14 record in 66 games, posting a 3.75 GAA.

=== Final standings ===
Smythe Division
| | GP | W | L | T | GF | GA | Pts |
|---|---|---|---|---|---|---|---|
| **St. Louis Blues** | 80 | 45 | 18 | 17 | 352 | 281 | 107 |
| **Chicago Black Hawks** | 80 | 31 | 33 | 16 | 304 | 315 | 78 |
| **Vancouver Canucks** | 80 | 28 | 32 | 20 | 289 | 301 | 76 |
| **Edmonton Oilers** | 80 | 29 | 35 | 16 | 328 | 327 | 74 |
| Colorado Rockies | 80 | 22 | 45 | 13 | 258 | 344 | 57 |
| Winnipeg Jets | 80 | 9 | 57 | 14 | 246 | 400 | 32 |

Note: GP = Games played, W = Wins, L = Losses, T = Ties, Pts = Points, GF = Goals for, GA = Goals against
Note: Teams that qualified for the playoffs are highlighted in bold.

League standings
| R | | Div | GP | W | L | T | GF | GA | Pts |
|---|---|---|---|---|---|---|---|---|---|
| 1 | **p – New York Islanders** | PTK | 80 | 48 | 18 | 14 | 355 | 260 | 110 |
| 2 | **x – St. Louis Blues** | SMY | 80 | 45 | 18 | 17 | 352 | 281 | 107 |
| 3 | **y – Montreal Canadiens** | NRS | 80 | 45 | 22 | 13 | 332 | 232 | 103 |
| 4 | **Los Angeles Kings** | NRS | 80 | 43 | 24 | 13 | 337 | 290 | 99 |
| 5 | **x – Buffalo Sabres** | ADM | 80 | 39 | 20 | 21 | 327 | 250 | 99 |
| 6 | **Philadelphia Flyers** | PTK | 80 | 41 | 24 | 15 | 313 | 249 | 97 |
| 7 | **Calgary Flames** | PTK | 80 | 39 | 27 | 14 | 329 | 298 | 92 |
| 8 | **Boston Bruins** | ADM | 80 | 37 | 30 | 13 | 316 | 272 | 87 |
| 9 | **Minnesota North Stars** | ADM | 80 | 35 | 28 | 17 | 291 | 263 | 87 |
| 10 | **Chicago Black Hawks** | SMY | 80 | 31 | 33 | 16 | 304 | 315 | 78 |
| 11 | **Quebec Nordiques** | ADM | 80 | 30 | 32 | 18 | 314 | 318 | 78 |
| 12 | **Vancouver Canucks** | SMY | 80 | 28 | 32 | 20 | 289 | 301 | 76 |
| 13 | **New York Rangers** | PTK | 80 | 30 | 36 | 14 | 312 | 317 | 74 |
| 14 | **Edmonton Oilers** | SMY | 80 | 29 | 35 | 16 | 328 | 327 | 74 |
| 15 | **Pittsburgh Penguins** | NRS | 80 | 30 | 37 | 13 | 302 | 345 | 73 |
| 16 | **Toronto Maple Leafs** | ADM | 80 | 28 | 37 | 15 | 322 | 367 | 71 |
| 17 | Washington Capitals | PTK | 80 | 26 | 36 | 18 | 286 | 317 | 70 |
| 18 | Hartford Whalers | NRS | 80 | 21 | 41 | 18 | 292 | 372 | 60 |
| 19 | Colorado Rockies | SMY | 80 | 22 | 45 | 13 | 258 | 344 | 57 |
| 20 | Detroit Red Wings | NRS | 80 | 19 | 43 | 18 | 252 | 339 | 56 |
| 21 | Winnipeg Jets | SMY | 80 | 9 | 57 | 14 | 246 | 400 | 32 |

Divisions: ADM – Adams, NRS – Norris, PTK – Patrick, SMY – Smythe

bold – The top 16 teams in the league qualified for the playoffs, regardless of division or conference.
x – Won division; y – Won Conference (and division); p – Won Presidents' Trophy (and conference and division)

=== Record vs. opponents ===
Smythe Division record vs. opponents

==== Vs. Campbell Conference ====
**Vs. Smythe Division**

1980–81 NHL records
| Team | **CHI** | **COL** | **EDM** | **STL** | **VAN** | **WIN** | **Total** |
|---|---|---|---|---|---|---|---|
| Chicago | — | 2−2 | 1−3 | 1−2−1 | 2−2 | 3−1 | 9−10−1 |
| Colorado | 2−2 | — | 3−0−1 | 1−3 | 0−2−2 | 1−2−1 | 7−9−4 |
| Edmonton | 3−1 | 0−3−1 | — | 1−2−1 | 2−2 | 4−0 | 10−8−2 |
| St. Louis | 2−1−1 | 3−1 | 2−1−1 | — | 4−0 | 2−0−2 | 13−3−4 |
| Vancouver | 2−2 | 2−0−2 | 2−2 | 0−4 | — | 2−0−2 | 8−8−4 |
| Winnipeg | 1−3 | 2−1−1 | 0−4 | 0−2−2 | 0−2−2 | — | 3−12−5 |

**Vs. Patrick Division**

1980–81 NHL records
| Team | **CGY** | **NYI** | **NYR** | **PHI** | **WSH** | **Total** |
|---|---|---|---|---|---|---|
| Chicago | 1−0−3 | 0−4 | 1−2−1 | 1−1−2 | 1−1−2 | 4−8−8 |
| Colorado | 3−1 | 1−3 | 3−1 | 0−4 | 0−3−1 | 7−12−1 |
| Edmonton | 1−2−1 | 0−2−2 | 1−2−1 | 2−2 | 1−2−1 | 5−10−5 |
| St. Louis | 2−2 | 0−2−2 | 4−0 | 0−3−1 | 2−0−2 | 8−7−5 |
| Vancouver | 1−3 | 1−3 | 1−2−1 | 2−1−1 | 1−1−2 | 6−10−4 |
| Winnipeg | 0−3−1 | 0−3−1 | 1−3 | 1−3 | 0−3−1 | 2−15−3 |

**Vs. Wales Conference**

**Vs. Adams Division**

1980–81 NHL records
| Team | **BOS** | **BUF** | **MIN** | **QUE** | **TOR** | **Total** |
|---|---|---|---|---|---|---|
| Chicago | 1−3 | 2−2 | 2−2 | 3−0−1 | 1−2−1 | 9−9−2 |
| Colorado | 1−2−1 | 0−3−1 | 1−2−1 | 2−2 | 1−1−2 | 5−10−5 |
| Edmonton | 1−3 | 1−1−2 | 1−2−1 | 1−3 | 2−1−1 | 6−10−4 |
| St. Louis | 3−1 | 3−0−1 | 1−2−1 | 2−1−1 | 3−1 | 12−5−3 |
| Vancouver | 2−2 | 1−1−2 | 1−2−1 | 1−1−2 | 3−0−1 | 8−6−6 |
| Winnipeg | 0−2−2 | 0−4 | 0−4 | 1−1−2 | 2−2 | 3−13−4 |

**Vs. Norris Division**

1980–81 NHL records
| Team | **DET** | **HFD** | **LAK** | **MTL** | **PIT** | **Total** |
|---|---|---|---|---|---|---|
| Chicago | 1−1−2 | 3−0−1 | 0−2−2 | 2−2 | 3−1 | 9−6−5 |
| Colorado | 1−2−1 | 1−2−1 | 0−3−1 | 0−4 | 1−3 | 3−14−3 |
| Edmonton | 2−1−1 | 2−1−1 | 0−2−2 | 2−2 | 2−1−1 | 8−7−5 |
| St. Louis | 4−0 | 3−0−1 | 2−0−2 | 1−1−2 | 2−2 | 12−3−5 |
| Vancouver | 2−1−1 | 1−1−2 | 0−4 | 0−2−2 | 3−0−1 | 6−8−6 |
| Winnipeg | 0−3−1 | 0−3−1 | 0−4 | 1−3 | 0−4 | 1−17−2 |

== Playoffs ==
The Black Hawks opened the playoffs with a best-of-five preliminary series against the Calgary Flames. The Flames finished the season with a 39–27–14 record, earning 92 points, 14 more than Chicago, and a third-place finish in the Patrick Division. The series opened with two games at the Calgary Corral, and in the first game, the Black Hawks were led by two goals by Darryl Sutter, but it wasn't enough as the Flames held on for a 4–3 victory. In the second game, the Flames dominated the Hawks, defeating Chicago 6–2, as Calgary was led by goaltender Reggie Lemelin, who made 38 saves. The series moved to Chicago Stadium for the third game, as the Flames took a 4–2 lead going into the third period. The Black Hawks tied the game on goals by Al Secord and Darryl Sutter to force overtime, however, in double overtime, Willi Plett of the Flames scored, as Calgary completed the series sweep.

== Schedule and results ==
=== Regular season ===
1980–81 regular season
October

| Game | Result | Date | Score | Opponent | Record |
|---|---|---|---|---|---|
| 1 | W | October 9, 1980 | 4–3 | Buffalo Sabres (1980–81) | 1–0–0 |
| 2 | W | October 11, 1980 | 5–4 | @ Montreal Canadiens (1980–81) | 2–0–0 |
| 3 | T | October 12, 1980 | 3–3 | Calgary Flames (1980–81) | 2–0–1 |
| 4 | W | October 15, 1980 | 4–2 | Vancouver Canucks (1980–81) | 3–0–1 |
| 5 | L | October 17, 1980 | 2–6 | @ Winnipeg Jets (1980–81) | 3–1–1 |
| 6 | W | October 19, 1980 | 8–4 | Washington Capitals (1980–81) | 4–1–1 |
| 7 | L | October 21, 1980 | 0–2 | @ Washington Capitals (1980–81) | 4–2–1 |
| 8 | L | October 23, 1980 | 2–7 | Montreal Canadiens (1980–81) | 4–3–1 |
| 9 | L | October 25, 1980 | 3–5 | @ Colorado Rockies (1980–81) | 4–4–1 |
| 10 | W | October 26, 1980 | 7–4 | Quebec Nordiques (1980–81) | 5–4–1 |
| 11 | T | October 28, 1980 | 2–2 | @ Detroit Red Wings (1980–81) | 5–4–2 |
| 12 | W | October 29, 1980 | 8–4 | Winnipeg Jets (1980–81) | 6–4–2 |

November

| Game | Result | Date | Score | Opponent | Record |
|---|---|---|---|---|---|
| 13 | L | November 2, 1980 | 3–5 | St. Louis Blues (1980–81) | 6–5–2 |
| 14 | T | November 5, 1980 | 3–3 | New York Rangers (1980–81) | 6–5–3 |
| 15 | L | November 8, 1980 | 3–7 | @ New York Islanders (1980–81) | 6–6–3 |
| 16 | L | November 9, 1980 | 1–7 | Minnesota North Stars (1980–81) | 6–7–3 |
| 17 | T | November 11, 1980 | 6–6 | @ Quebec Nordiques (1980–81) | 6–7–4 |
| 18 | T | November 13, 1980 | 4–4 | @ Calgary Flames (1980–81) | 6–7–5 |
| 19 | L | November 15, 1980 | 2–5 | @ Minnesota North Stars (1980–81) | 6–8–5 |
| 20 | L | November 16, 1980 | 4–5 | Edmonton Oilers (1980–81) | 6–9–5 |
| 21 | W | November 19, 1980 | 5–2 | Buffalo Sabres (1980–81) | 7–9–5 |
| 22 | W | November 22, 1980 | 6–2 | @ Minnesota North Stars (1980–81) | 8–9–5 |
| 23 | W | November 23, 1980 | 11–3 | Hartford Whalers (1980–81) | 9–9–5 |
| 24 | L | November 26, 1980 | 3–10 | @ Edmonton Oilers (1980–81) | 9–10–5 |
| 25 | L | November 28, 1980 | 4–6 | @ Vancouver Canucks (1980–81) | 9–11–5 |
| 26 | L | November 29, 1980 | 2–5 | @ Los Angeles Kings (1980–81) | 9–12–5 |

December

| Game | Result | Date | Score | Opponent | Record |
|---|---|---|---|---|---|
| 27 | L | December 4, 1980 | 5–7 | @ Philadelphia Flyers (1980–81) | 9–13–5 |
| 28 | L | December 6, 1980 | 4–6 | @ Pittsburgh Penguins (1980–81) | 9–14–5 |
| 29 | L | December 7, 1980 | 4–5 | @ New York Rangers (1980–81) | 9–15–5 |
| 30 | T | December 10, 1980 | 2–2 | Philadelphia Flyers (1980–81) | 9–15–6 |
| 31 | W | December 11, 1980 | 5–2 | @ St. Louis Blues (1980–81) | 10–15–6 |
| 32 | L | December 13, 1980 | 3–7 | @ Detroit Red Wings (1980–81) | 10–16–6 |
| 33 | W | December 14, 1980 | 2–1 | New York Rangers (1980–81) | 11–16–6 |
| 34 | L | December 17, 1980 | 1–6 | Colorado Rockies (1980–81) | 11–17–6 |
| 35 | W | December 20, 1980 | 5–2 | @ Toronto Maple Leafs (1980–81) | 12–17–6 |
| 36 | L | December 21, 1980 | 0–9 | New York Islanders (1980–81) | 12–18–6 |
| 37 | L | December 26, 1980 | 2–3 | @ Buffalo Sabres (1980–81) | 12–19–6 |
| 38 | L | December 28, 1980 | 3–6 | Toronto Maple Leafs (1980–81) | 12–20–6 |
| 39 | L | December 31, 1980 | 2–4 | Boston Bruins (1980–81) | 12–21–6 |

January

| Game | Result | Date | Score | Opponent | Record |
|---|---|---|---|---|---|
| 40 | L | January 3, 1981 | 1–2 | @ Montreal Canadiens (1980–81) | 12–22–6 |
| 41 | W | January 4, 1981 | 3–2 | Pittsburgh Penguins (1980–81) | 13–22–6 |
| 42 | W | January 7, 1981 | 6–2 | Colorado Rockies (1980–81) | 14–22–6 |
| 43 | W | January 10, 1981 | 5–3 | @ Pittsburgh Penguins (1980–81) | 15–22–6 |
| 44 | W | January 11, 1981 | 2–1 | Calgary Flames (1980–81) | 16–22–6 |
| 45 | W | January 15, 1981 | 3–2 | Boston Bruins (1980–81) | 17–22–6 |
| 46 | W | January 17, 1981 | 3–2 | @ Hartford Whalers (1980–81) | 18–22–6 |
| 47 | W | January 18, 1981 | 7–2 | Quebec Nordiques (1980–81) | 19–22–6 |
| 48 | W | January 21, 1981 | 4–2 | Montreal Canadiens (1980–81) | 20–22–6 |
| 49 | L | January 24, 1981 | 2–4 | @ St. Louis Blues (1980–81) | 20–23–6 |
| 50 | W | January 28, 1981 | 7–3 | Vancouver Canucks (1980–81) | 21–23–6 |
| 51 | L | January 30, 1981 | 2–4 | @ Edmonton Oilers (1980–81) | 21–24–6 |
| 52 | T | January 31, 1981 | 3–3 | @ Calgary Flames (1980–81) | 21–24–7 |

February

| Game | Result | Date | Score | Opponent | Record |
|---|---|---|---|---|---|
| 53 | W | February 2, 1981 | 8–4 | Pittsburgh Penguins (1980–81) | 22–24–7 |
| 54 | W | February 4, 1981 | 6–3 | Edmonton Oilers (1980–81) | 23–24–7 |
| 55 | W | February 7, 1981 | 6–2 | @ Hartford Whalers (1980–81) | 24–24–7 |
| 56 | W | February 8, 1981 | 9–1 | Winnipeg Jets (1980–81) | 25–24–7 |
| 57 | T | February 12, 1981 | 5–5 | Los Angeles Kings (1980–81) | 25–24–8 |
| 58 | W | February 14, 1981 | 4–3 | @ Colorado Rockies (1980–81) | 26–24–8 |
| 59 | T | February 15, 1981 | 4–4 | Hartford Whalers (1980–81) | 26–24–9 |
| 60 | T | February 18, 1981 | 5–5 | @ Washington Capitals (1980–81) | 26–24–10 |
| 61 | L | February 21, 1981 | 3–6 | @ New York Islanders (1980–81) | 26–25–10 |
| 62 | L | February 22, 1981 | 4–7 | Toronto Maple Leafs (1980–81) | 26–26–10 |
| 63 | T | February 25, 1981 | 2–2 | Washington Capitals (1980–81) | 26–26–11 |
| 64 | L | February 27, 1981 | 1–6 | @ Buffalo Sabres (1980–81) | 26–27–11 |

March

| Game | Result | Date | Score | Opponent | Record |
|---|---|---|---|---|---|
| 65 | T | March 1, 1981 | 4–4 | St. Louis Blues (1980–81) | 26–27–12 |
| 66 | T | March 4, 1981 | 3–3 | Detroit Red Wings (1980–81) | 26–27–13 |
| 67 | L | March 7, 1981 | 1–7 | @ Boston Bruins (1980–81) | 26–28–13 |
| 68 | W | March 8, 1981 | 3–2 | @ Quebec Nordiques (1980–81) | 27–28–13 |
| 69 | T | March 11, 1981 | 4–4 | @ Los Angeles Kings (1980–81) | 27–28–14 |
| 70 | L | March 13, 1981 | 3–5 | @ Vancouver Canucks (1980–81) | 27–29–14 |
| 71 | W | March 15, 1981 | 8–2 | @ Winnipeg Jets (1980–81) | 28–29–14 |
| 72 | W | March 18, 1981 | 5–1 | Philadelphia Flyers (1980–81) | 29–29–14 |
| 73 | T | March 21, 1981 | 4–4 | @ Philadelphia Flyers (1980–81) | 29–29–15 |
| 74 | L | March 22, 1981 | 2–6 | New York Islanders (1980–81) | 29–30–15 |
| 75 | L | March 25, 1981 | 2–4 | Los Angeles Kings (1980–81) | 29–31–15 |
| 76 | L | March 28, 1981 | 2–5 | @ Boston Bruins (1980–81) | 29–32–15 |
| 77 | W | March 29, 1981 | 4–3 | Detroit Red Wings (1980–81) | 30–32–15 |

April

| Game | Result | Date | Score | Opponent | Record |
|---|---|---|---|---|---|
| 78 | T | April 1, 1981 | 2–2 | @ Toronto Maple Leafs (1980–81) | 30–32–16 |
| 79 | L | April 3, 1981 | 1–3 | @ New York Rangers (1980–81) | 30–33–16 |
| 80 | W | April 5, 1981 | 8–4 | Minnesota North Stars (1980–81) | 31–33–16 |

Legend: Win (2 points) Loss (0 points) Tie (1 point)

=== Playoffs ===
1981 Stanley Cup playoffs
Preliminary round vs. (7) Calgary Flames – Flames win 3–0

| Game | Date | Visitor | Score | Home | Series |
|---|---|---|---|---|---|
| 1 | April 8 | Chicago Black Hawks | 3–4 | Calgary Flames | 0–1 |
| 2 | April 9 | Chicago Black Hawks | 2–6 | Calgary Flames | 0–2 |
| 3 | April 11 | Calgary Flames | 5–4 | Chicago Black Hawks | 0–3 |

Legend: Win Loss

== Player statistics ==
=== Regular season ===
Scoring

| Player | Pos | GP | G | A | Pts | PIM | +/- | PPG | SHG | GWG |
|---|---|---|---|---|---|---|---|---|---|---|
| Tom Lysiak | C | 72 | 21 | 55 | 76 | 20 | 7 | 5 | 2 | 3 |
| Denis Savard | C | 76 | 28 | 47 | 75 | 47 | 27 | 4 | 0 | 3 |
| Darryl Sutter | LW | 76 | 40 | 22 | 62 | 86 | -1 | 14 | 0 | 4 |
| Reg Kerr | LW | 70 | 30 | 30 | 60 | 56 | 10 | 6 | 0 | 4 |
| Bob Murray | D | 77 | 13 | 47 | 60 | 93 | 6 | 6 | 0 | 1 |
| Tim Higgins | RW | 78 | 24 | 35 | 59 | 86 | 20 | 1 | 0 | 1 |
| Terry Ruskowski | C | 72 | 8 | 51 | 59 | 225 | -19 | 2 | 0 | 2 |
| Doug Wilson | D | 76 | 12 | 39 | 51 | 80 | 6 | 3 | 0 | 1 |
| Keith Brown | D | 80 | 9 | 34 | 43 | 80 | 5 | 0 | 1 | 1 |
| Ted Bulley | LW | 68 | 18 | 16 | 34 | 95 | 18 | 3 | 0 | 2 |
| Grant Mulvey | RW | 42 | 18 | 14 | 32 | 81 | -18 | 6 | 1 | 4 |
| Glen Sharpley | C | 35 | 10 | 16 | 26 | 12 | 6 | 4 | 0 | 0 |
| Al Secord | LW | 41 | 13 | 9 | 22 | 145 | -4 | 3 | 0 | 2 |
| Rich Preston | RW | 47 | 7 | 14 | 21 | 24 | -15 | 3 | 0 | 1 |
| Mike O'Connell | D | 34 | 5 | 16 | 21 | 32 | 5 | 1 | 1 | 0 |
| Greg Fox | D | 75 | 3 | 16 | 19 | 112 | -10 | 0 | 0 | 0 |
| Ron Sedlbauer | LW | 39 | 12 | 3 | 15 | 12 | -7 | 3 | 0 | 0 |
| John Marks | LW | 39 | 8 | 6 | 14 | 28 | -3 | 1 | 1 | 0 |
| Miles Zaharko | D | 42 | 3 | 11 | 14 | 40 | 22 | 0 | 0 | 1 |
| Dave Hutchison | D | 59 | 2 | 9 | 11 | 124 | 12 | 0 | 0 | 0 |
| Rick Paterson | C | 49 | 8 | 2 | 10 | 18 | -2 | 1 | 2 | 1 |
| Peter Marsh | RW | 29 | 4 | 6 | 10 | 10 | 0 | 0 | 0 | 0 |
| Florent Robidoux | LW | 39 | 6 | 2 | 8 | 75 | -6 | 1 | 0 | 0 |
| Tony Esposito | G | 66 | 0 | 3 | 3 | 0 | 0 | 0 | 0 | 0 |
| Ken Solheim | LW | 5 | 2 | 0 | 2 | 0 | -3 | 0 | 0 | 0 |
| Doug Crossman | D | 9 | 0 | 2 | 2 | 2 | -5 | 0 | 0 | 0 |
| Brian Young | D | 8 | 0 | 2 | 2 | 6 | -4 | 0 | 0 | 0 |
| Steve Larmer | RW | 4 | 0 | 1 | 1 | 0 | 1 | 0 | 0 | 0 |
| Murray Bannerman | G | 15 | 0 | 0 | 0 | 0 | 0 | 0 | 0 | 0 |
| Bill Gardner | C | 1 | 0 | 0 | 0 | 0 | 0 | 0 | 0 | 0 |
| Doug Lecuyer | LW | 14 | 0 | 0 | 0 | 41 | -2 | 0 | 0 | 0 |

Goaltending

| Player | MIN | GP | W | L | T | GA | GAA | SO |
|---|---|---|---|---|---|---|---|---|
| Tony Esposito | 3935 | 66 | 29 | 23 | 14 | 246 | 3.75 | 0 |
| Murray Bannerman | 865 | 15 | 2 | 10 | 2 | 62 | 4.30 | 0 |
| Team: | 4800 | 80 | 31 | 33 | 16 | 308 | 3.85 | 0 |

=== Playoffs ===
Scoring

| Player | Pos | GP | G | A | Pts | PIM | PPG | SHG | GWG |
|---|---|---|---|---|---|---|---|---|---|
| Al Secord | LW | 3 | 4 | 0 | 4 | 14 | 0 | 0 | 0 |
| Darryl Sutter | LW | 3 | 3 | 1 | 4 | 2 | 1 | 0 | 0 |
| Tom Lysiak | C | 3 | 0 | 3 | 3 | 0 | 0 | 0 | 0 |
| Doug Wilson | D | 3 | 0 | 3 | 3 | 2 | 0 | 0 | 0 |
| Peter Marsh | RW | 2 | 1 | 1 | 2 | 2 | 0 | 0 | 0 |
| Keith Brown | D | 3 | 0 | 2 | 2 | 2 | 0 | 0 | 0 |
| Terry Ruskowski | C | 3 | 0 | 2 | 2 | 11 | 0 | 0 | 0 |
| Glen Sharpley | C | 1 | 0 | 2 | 2 | 0 | 0 | 0 | 0 |
| Rick Paterson | C | 2 | 1 | 0 | 1 | 0 | 0 | 1 | 0 |
| Greg Fox | D | 3 | 0 | 1 | 1 | 2 | 0 | 0 | 0 |
| Rich Preston | RW | 3 | 0 | 1 | 1 | 0 | 0 | 0 | 0 |
| Tony Esposito | G | 3 | 0 | 0 | 0 | 0 | 0 | 0 | 0 |
| Tim Higgins | RW | 3 | 0 | 0 | 0 | 0 | 0 | 0 | 0 |
| Dave Hutchison | D | 2 | 0 | 0 | 0 | 2 | 0 | 0 | 0 |
| Reg Kerr | LW | 3 | 0 | 0 | 0 | 2 | 0 | 0 | 0 |
| John Marks | LW | 3 | 0 | 0 | 0 | 0 | 0 | 0 | 0 |
| Grant Mulvey | RW | 3 | 0 | 0 | 0 | 0 | 0 | 0 | 0 |
| Bob Murray | D | 3 | 0 | 0 | 0 | 2 | 0 | 0 | 0 |
| Denis Savard | C | 3 | 0 | 0 | 0 | 0 | 0 | 0 | 0 |
| Miles Zaharko | D | 2 | 0 | 0 | 0 | 0 | 0 | 0 | 0 |

Goaltending

| Player | MIN | GP | W | L | GA | GAA | SO |
|---|---|---|---|---|---|---|---|
| Tony Esposito | 215 | 3 | 0 | 3 | 15 | 4.19 | 0 |
| Team: | 215 | 3 | 0 | 3 | 15 | 4.19 | 0 |

Note: Pos = Position; GP = Games played; G = Goals; A = Assists; Pts = Points; +/- = plus/minus; PIM = Penalty minutes; PPG = Power-play goals; SHG = Short-handed goals; GWG = Game-winning goals
MIN = Minutes played; W = Wins; L = Losses; T = Ties; GA = Goals-against; GAA = Goals-against average; SO = Shutouts;

== Transactions ==
The Black Hawks were involved in the following transactions during the 1980–81 season.

=== Trades ===
| June 14, 1980 | To Chicago Black Hawks 2nd-round pick in 1981 – Kevin Griffin | To Hartford Whalers Mike Veisor |
| December 1, 1980 | To Chicago Black Hawks Peter Marsh | To Winnipeg Jets Tim Trimper; Doug Lecuyer |
| December 18, 1980 | To Chicago Black Hawks Al Secord | To Boston Bruins Mike O'Connell |
| December 29, 1980 | To Chicago Black Hawks Glen Sharpley | To Minnesota North Stars Ken Solheim; 2nd-round pick in 1981 – Tom Hirsch |
| February 18, 1981 | To Chicago Black Hawks Cash | To Toronto Maple Leafs Ron Sedlbauer |

=== Free agent signings ===
| June 3, 1980 | From Fort Wayne Komets (IHL) Bob Janecyk |

== Draft picks ==
Chicago's draft picks at the 1980 NHL entry draft held at the Montreal Forum in Montreal.

| Round | # | Player | Nationality | College/Junior/Club team (League) |
|---|---|---|---|---|
| 1 | 3 | Denis Savard | Canada | Montreal Juniors (QMJHL) |
| 1 | 15 | Jerry Dupont | Canada | Toronto Marlboros (OHA) |
| 2 | 28 | Steve Ludzik | Canada | Niagara Falls Flyers (OHA) |
| 2 | 30 | Ken Solheim | Canada | Medicine Hat Tigers (WHL) |
| 2 | 36 | Len Dawes | Canada | Victoria Cougars (WHL) |
| 3 | 57 | Troy Murray | Canada | St. Albert Saints (AJHL) |
| 3 | 58 | Marcel Frere | Canada | Billings Bighorns (WHL) |
| 4 | 67 | Carey Wilson | Canada | Dartmouth College (ECAC) |
| 4 | 78 | Brian Shaw | Canada | Portland Winter Hawks (WHL) |
| 5 | 99 | Kevin Ginnell | Canada | Medicine Hat Tigers (WHL) |
| 6 | 120 | Steve Larmer | Canada | Niagara Falls Flyers (OMJHL) |
| 7 | 141 | Sean Simpson | Canada | Ottawa 67's (OMJHL) |
| 8 | 162 | Jim Ralph | Canada | Ottawa 67's (OMJHL) |
| 9 | 183 | Don Dietrich | Canada | Brandon Wheat Kings (WHL) |
| 10 | 204 | Dan Frawley | Canada | Sudbury Wolves (OMJHL) |

== See also ==
- 1980–81 NHL season
