= 1980–81 Hartford Whalers season =

National Hockey League season

1980–81 Hartford Whalers
- Division: 4th Norris
- Conference: 9th Wales
- 1980–81 record: 21–41–18
- Home record: 14–17–9
- Road record: 7–24–9
- Goals for: 292
- Goals against: 372

Team information
- General manager: Jack Kelley
- Coach: Don Blackburn (15-29-16); Larry Pleau (6-12-2)
- Captain: Rick Ley; Mike Rogers
- Arena: Hartford Civic Center
- Average attendance: 11,704 (80.7%)
- Minor league affiliates: Binghamton Whalers (AHL); Saginaw Gears (IHL); Syracuse Hornets (EHL)

Team leaders
- Goals: Blaine Stoughton (43)
- Assists: Mike Rogers (65)
- Points: Mike Rogers (105)
- Penalty minutes: Tom Rowe (190)
- Plus/minus: Mark Howe (+9)
- Wins: John Garrett (15)
- Goals against average: Mike Veisor (4.46)

The 1980–81 Hartford Whalers season was the Whalers' second season in the National Hockey League (NHL). The Whalers failed to qualify for 1981 Stanley Cup playoffs, as the club finished with a 21–41–18 record, earning 60 points, which was 11 points behind the Toronto Maple Leafs for the final playoff position. This marked the first time since joining the NHL that the Whalers did not qualify for the playoffs.

== Offseason ==
On May 23, Hartford signed defenseman Thommy Abrahamsson as a free agent. Abrahamsson played in 26 games with Leksands IF of Elitserien, scoring nine goals and 15 points. Abrahamsson had previously played with the Whalers from 1974 to 1977, when the club was still a part of the WHA. In 203 games with New England, Abrahamsson scored 28 goals and 95 points.

Gordie Howe announced his retirement from the team on June 4. Howe retired as the highest scoring player in NHL history, as he scored 801 goals and added 1049 assists for 1850 points in 1767 games in a career that spanned from 1946 until 1980. Howe joined the Whalers organization in 1977, and in two seasons with the New England Whalers in the WHA, he scored 53 goals and 139 points in 134 games. In 1979–80, he remained with the club as they moved to the NHL, and Howe, at the age of 51, scored 15 goals and 41 points in 80 games, followed with a goal and two points in three playoff games. Following this announcement, the Whalers hired Howe as director of player development.

On June 5, the Whalers acquired center Rick Meagher, a third-round pick and a fifth-round pick in the 1981 NHL entry draft from the Montreal Canadiens in exchange for a third round and a fifth-round pick in 1981. Meagher appeared in only two games with Montreal during 1979–80, as he spent most of the season with their American Hockey League affiliate, the Nova Scotia Voyageurs. In 64 games with Nova Scotia, Meagher had 32 goals and 76 points, followed by three goals and seven points in six post-season games.

At the 1980 NHL entry draft held at the Montreal Forum on June 11, the Whalers selected defenseman Fred Arthur from the Cornwall Royals of the QMJHL with their first-round pick, eighth overall. In 67 games with Cornwall in 1979–80, Arthur scored five goals and 70 assists for 75 points. In the postseason, Arthur had two goals and 14 points in 18 games, helping Cornwall win the President's Cup and earn a berth at the 1980 Memorial Cup. During the Memorial Cup, Arthur had five assists in five games, helping the Royals win the championship.

On June 14, Hartford acquired goaltender Mike Veisor from the Chicago Black Hawks in exchange for a second-round draft pick in the 1981 NHL entry draft. Veisor had a record of 3–5–3 with a 3.28 GAA and a .903 save percentage in 11 games with Chicago during 1979–80.

The Whalers acquired right winger Warren Miller off of waivers under terms from the 1979 expansion draft from the New York Rangers on August 7. The Whalers had to give the Rangers cash to complete the deal. Miller scored seven goals and 13 points in 55 games with New York in 1979–80. In 1978–79, Miller scored 26 goals and 49 points in 77 games with the New England Whalers.

On September 1, right winger Bobby Hull announced his retirement as a player. Hull appeared in nine games with Hartford in 1979–80, scoring two goals and seven points after he was acquired from the Winnipeg Jets. In 1090 career NHL games, Hull scored 616 goals and 1187 points as he played with the Chicago Black Hawks from 1957 to 1972 before signing with the Jets as a free agent. In 411 career WHA games with Winnipeg, Hull scored 303 goals and 638 points from 1972 to 1979, before rejoining the NHL in 1979–80 with the Jets.

On September 4, the Whalers traded away goaltender Al Smith to the Colorado Rockies in exchange for cash. Smith had a record of 11–10–8 with a 3.67 GAA and a .876 save percentage with the Whalers in 1979–80. In 1973, Smith led the Whalers to the Avco Cup, and in 1978, he won the Ben Hatskin Trophy which was awarded to the best goaltender in the World Hockey Association.

== Regular season ==
=== October ===
The Whalers opened the 1980–81 season with a four-game road trip, and on October 9, they lost 8–6 to the St. Louis Blues, followed by a 9–3 loss two nights later against the Minnesota North Stars. After a 2–2 tie against the Buffalo Sabres, the Whalers earned their first victory on October 15, with a 5–2 win over the Pittsburgh Penguins.

Hartford played their first home game of the season on October 18 against the Detroit Red Wings in front of 10,287 fans. The Whalers Al Sims led the way with two goals, and John Garrett made 26 saves in the Whalers 4–2 victory. The team would post a 3–0–1 record on their opening four game home stand.

The Whalers would finish the month with a solid record of 5–4–2, earning 12 points, and second place in the Norris Division, three points behind the first place Los Angeles Kings.

=== November ===
The Whalers would slump to begin the month of November, as the club would go winless in their first eight games (0–6–2) of the month before earning a 4–3 victory over the Vancouver Canucks on November 22. The Whalers would follow that game up with a huge 11–3 loss to the Chicago Black Hawks the next night.

Hartford would end November with two wins in their final three games, bringing their season record to 8–12–4 record with 20 points, sitting in third place in the Norris Division.

=== December ===
The Whalers opened December with a five-game western road trip, in which the team put up a respectable 2–2–1 record, with wins over the Calgary Flames and Winnipeg Jets.

The team returned home for two games, as Hartford tied the Los Angeles Kings 5–5 on December 13, followed by a 5–4 win over the Boston Bruins on December 17. The Whalers then headed out for a three-game road trip before Christmas, in which the Whalers tied the Bruins 5–5, lost to the Quebec Nordiques 6–5, followed by a huge 7–2 win over the Toronto Maple Leafs on December 23.

On December 26, the Whalers and Pittsburgh Penguins played a very high scoring game, as Hartford came out on top with a 9–7 victory. Hartford ended the month with a 5–5 tie against the defending Stanley Cup champion New York Islanders the next night.

Overall, the Whalers had a 5–3–4 record in their 12 December games, and improved to 13–15–8, earning 34 points, for the season. The Whalers continued to stay into third place in the Norris Division, five points ahead of the fourth place Pittsburgh Penguins.

=== January ===
Hartford got off to a bad start in January, losing their first three games, snapping their losing streak with a 6–6 tie against the Edmonton Oilers on January 9. The Whalers earned their first win of the month the next night, defeating the Winnipeg Jets 5–3.

The Whalers losing ways would return though, as the club lost four games in a row, including three by one goal, before ending the streak with a tie against the St. Louis Blues on January 21. Hartford would then lose their next two games, extending their winless streak to seven games, before the team finally defeated the Colorado Rockies 6–3 on January 28. Hartford then went winless in their last two games (0–1–1) of the month.

The team managed a 2–10–3 record in 15 games for the month, and had a 15–25–11 record, getting 41 points at the end January. Hartford fell into fourth place in the Norris Division, one point behind the third place Pittsburgh Penguins, and four points ahead of the last place Detroit Red Wings.

=== February ===
The Whalers losing ways continued into February, as Hartford would go winless in their first nine games of the month (0–4–5), and extend their overall winless streak to 11 games.

After their 6–2 loss to the Pittsburgh Penguins on February 19, the Whalers fired head coach Don Blackburn, and replaced him with Larry Pleau.

In his first game as the head coach, Pleau ended the Whalers winless skid, as Hartford defeated the New York Rangers 6–5 on February 22. The club won their next game three nights later, defeating the Minnesota North Stars 3–2, however, their winning streak ended with a 5–1 loss to the Calgary Flames on February 27.

The Whalers had a 2–5–5 record in February, and had a 4–15–8 record since the start of January. The Whalers overall season record at the end of February was 17–30–16, as they earned 50 points, and remained in fourth place in the Norris Division, only two points ahead of the Detroit Red Wings.

=== March/April ===
The Whalers began March with two straight losses before earning a 5–3 win over the Buffalo Sabres on March 6. Hartford then went on a five-game winless skid (0–4–1) before earning another victory, which was a huge 9–3 win over the Montreal Canadiens.

Hartford would continue to struggle for the rest of the regular season, as they posted a 2–5–1 record in their final eight games after the 9–3 win over the Canadiens.

The team finished their second season with a 21–41–18 record, earning 60 points, and fourth place in the Norris Division, four points ahead of the Detroit Red Wings. The Whalers failed to qualify for the playoffs for the first time in team history.

=== Final standings ===
Norris Division
	GP	W	L	T	GF	GA	Pts
**Montreal Canadiens**	80	45	22	13	332	232	103
**Los Angeles Kings**	80	43	24	13	337	290	99
**Pittsburgh Penguins**	80	30	37	13	302	345	73
Hartford Whalers	80	21	41	18	292	372	60
Detroit Red Wings	80	19	43	18	252	339	56

Note: GP = Games played, W = Wins, L = Losses, T = Ties, Pts = Points, GF = Goals for, GA = Goals against
Note: Teams that qualified for the playoffs are highlighted in bold.

League standings
R		Div	GP	W	L	T	GF	GA	Pts
1	**p – New York Islanders**	PTK	80	48	18	14	355	260	110
2	**x – St. Louis Blues**	SMY	80	45	18	17	352	281	107
3	**y – Montreal Canadiens**	NRS	80	45	22	13	332	232	103
4	**Los Angeles Kings**	NRS	80	43	24	13	337	290	99
5	**x – Buffalo Sabres**	ADM	80	39	20	21	327	250	99
6	**Philadelphia Flyers**	PTK	80	41	24	15	313	249	97
7	**Calgary Flames**	PTK	80	39	27	14	329	298	92
8	**Boston Bruins**	ADM	80	37	30	13	316	272	87
9	**Minnesota North Stars**	ADM	80	35	28	17	291	263	87
10	**Chicago Black Hawks**	SMY	80	31	33	16	304	315	78
11	**Quebec Nordiques**	ADM	80	30	32	18	314	318	78
12	**Vancouver Canucks**	SMY	80	28	32	20	289	301	76
13	**New York Rangers**	PTK	80	30	36	14	312	317	74
14	**Edmonton Oilers**	SMY	80	29	35	16	328	327	74
15	**Pittsburgh Penguins**	NRS	80	30	37	13	302	345	73
16	**Toronto Maple Leafs**	ADM	80	28	37	15	322	367	71
17	Washington Capitals	PTK	80	26	36	18	286	317	70
18	Hartford Whalers	NRS	80	21	41	18	292	372	60
19	Colorado Rockies	SMY	80	22	45	13	258	344	57
20	Detroit Red Wings	NRS	80	19	43	18	252	339	56
21	Winnipeg Jets	SMY	80	9	57	14	246	400	32

Divisions: ADM – Adams, NRS – Norris, PTK – Patrick, SMY – Smythe

bold – The top 16 teams in the league qualified for the playoffs, regardless of division or conference.
x – Won division; y – Won Conference (and division); p – Won Presidents' Trophy (and conference and division)

=== Record vs. opponents ===
Norris Division record vs. opponents

==== Vs. Wales Conference ====
**Vs. Norris Division**

1980–81 NHL records
Team	**DET**	**HFD**	**LAK**	**MTL**	**PIT**	**Total**
Detroit	—	0−2−2	1−3	1−3	1−2−1	**3−10−3**
Hartford	2−0−2	—	0−3−1	1−3	2−2	**5−8−3**
Los Angeles	3−1	3−0−1	—	1−3	0−2−2	**7−6−3**
Montreal	3−1	3−1	3−1	—	2−2	**11−5−0**
Pittsburgh	2−1−1	2−2	2−0−2	2−2	—	**8−5−3**

**Vs. Adams Division**

1980–81 NHL records
Team	**BOS**	**BUF**	**MIN**	**QUE**	**TOR**	**Total**
Detroit	0−2−2	0−3−1	0−2−2	0−3−1	3−1	**3−11−6**
Hartford	1−1−2	1−2−1	1−3	2−2	1−1−2	**6−9−5**
Los Angeles	2−2	1−2−1	4−0	3−1	3−0−1	**13−5−2**
Montreal	3−1	3−1	1−2−1	1−1−2	3−1	**11−6−3**
Pittsburgh	0−3−1	0−3−1	1−3	2−1−1	1−2−1	**4−12−4**

==== Vs. Campbell Conference ====
**Vs. Patrick Division**

1980–81 NHL records
Team	**CGY**	**NYI**	**NYR**	**PHI**	**WSH**	**Total**
Detroit	1−2−1	0−4	2−1−1	1−3	1−2−1	**5−12−3**
Hartford	1−3	0−2−2	1−3	0−3−1	1−3	**3−14−3**
Los Angeles	1−3	2−2	3−1	0−4	2−1−1	**8−11−1**
Montreal	2−1−1	1−2−1	2−1−1	2−1−1	2−0−2	**9−5−6**
Pittsburgh	1−2−1	2−1−1	2−1−1	0−4	2−1−1	**7−9−4**

**Vs. Smythe Division**

1980–81 NHL records
Team	**CHI**	**COL**	**EDM**	**STL**	**VAN**	**WIN**	**Total**
Detroit	1−1−2	2−1−1	1−2−1	0−4	1−2−1	3−0−1	**8−10−6**
Hartford	0−3−1	2−1−1	1−2−1	0−3−1	1−1−2	3−0−1	**7−10−7**
Los Angeles	2−0−2	3−0−1	2−0−2	0−2−2	4−0	4−0	**15−2−7**
Montreal	2−2	4−0	2−2	1−1−2	2−0−2	3−1	**14−6−4**
Pittsburgh	1−3	3−1	1−2−1	2−2	0−3−1	4−0	**11−11−2**

== Schedule and results ==
1980–81 regular season
October

Game	Result	Date	Score	Opponent	Record	Attendance
1	L	October 9, 1980	6–8	@ St. Louis Blues (1980–81)	0–1–0	11,132
2	L	October 11, 1980	3–9	@ Minnesota North Stars (1980–81)	0–2–0	15,338
3	T	October 12, 1980	3–3	@ Buffalo Sabres (1980–81)	0–2–1	16,433
4	W	October 15, 1980	5–2	@ Pittsburgh Penguins (1980–81)	1–2–1	5,637
5	W	October 18, 1980	4–2	Detroit Red Wings (1980–81)	2–2–1	10,287
6	T	October 19, 1980	3–3	New York Islanders (1980–81)	2–2–2	10,014
7	W	October 22, 1980	3–0	Colorado Rockies (1980–81)	3–2–2	9,595
8	W	October 25, 1980	4–2	Quebec Nordiques (1980–81)	4–2–2	11,005
9	L	October 26, 1980	1–6	@ Philadelphia Flyers (1980–81)	4–3–2	17,077
10	W	October 29, 1980	5–3	Detroit Red Wings (1980–81)	5–3–2	9,103
11	L	October 30, 1980	2–8	@ Montreal Canadiens (1980–81)	5–4–2	15,555

November

Game	Result	Date	Score	Opponent	Record	Attendance
12	T	November 1, 1980	4–4	Vancouver Canucks (1980–81)	5–4–3	10,418
13	L	November 5, 1980	1–6	@ St. Louis Blues (1980–81)	5–5–3	10,278
14	T	November 6, 1980	3–3	@ Colorado Rockies (1980–81)	5–5–4	5,669
15	L	November 8, 1980	4–5	Philadelphia Flyers (1980–81)	5–6–4	13,191
16	L	November 12, 1980	1–5	Minnesota North Stars (1980–81)	5–7–4	10,044
17	L	November 15, 1980	4–8	Washington Capitals (1980–81)	5–8–4	11,544
18	L	November 16, 1980	3–7	@ New York Rangers (1980–81)	5–9–4	17,419
19	L	November 20, 1980	0–5	@ New York Islanders (1980–81)	5–10–4	14,062
20	W	November 22, 1980	4–3	Vancouver Canucks (1980–81)	6–10–4	11,160
21	L	November 23, 1980	3–11	@ Chicago Black Hawks (1980–81)	6–11–4	10,827
22	W	November 26, 1980	8–4	Winnipeg Jets (1980–81)	7–11–4	10,741
23	W	November 28, 1980	6–4	Edmonton Oilers (1980–81)	8–11–4	11,073
24	L	November 29, 1980	2–5	Buffalo Sabres (1980–81)	8–12–4	13,202

December

Game	Result	Date	Score	Opponent	Record	Attendance
25	L	December 2, 1980	2–5	@ Los Angeles Kings (1980–81)	8–13–4	7,456
26	T	December 3, 1980	4–4	@ Vancouver Canucks (1980–81)	8–13–5	11,281
27	W	December 6, 1980	5–3	@ Calgary Flames (1980–81)	9–13–5	7,083
28	L	December 7, 1980	4–6	@ Edmonton Oilers (1980–81)	9–14–5	17,215
29	W	December 10, 1980	8–5	@ Winnipeg Jets (1980–81)	10–14–5	11,623
30	T	December 13, 1980	5–5	Los Angeles Kings (1980–81)	10–14–6	11,204
31	W	December 17, 1980	5–4	Boston Bruins (1980–81)	11–14–6	13,111
32	T	December 20, 1980	4–4	@ Boston Bruins (1980–81)	11–14–7	9,616
33	L	December 21, 1980	5–6	@ Quebec Nordiques (1980–81)	11–15–7	10,241
34	W	December 23, 1980	7–2	@ Toronto Maple Leafs (1980–81)	12–15–7	16,430
35	W	December 26, 1980	9–7	Pittsburgh Penguins (1980–81)	13–15–7	12,208
36	T	December 27, 1980	5–5	New York Islanders (1980–81)	13–15–8	14,510

January

Game	Result	Date	Score	Opponent	Record	Attendance
37	L	January 2, 1981	1–3	Montreal Canadiens (1980–81)	13–16–8	14,510
38	L	January 3, 1981	1–8	@ New York Islanders (1980–81)	13–17–8	15,008
39	L	January 7, 1981	3–5	@ Los Angeles Kings (1980–81)	13–18–8	8,535
40	T	January 9, 1981	6–6	@ Edmonton Oilers (1980–81)	13–18–9	17,474
41	W	January 10, 1981	5–3	@ Winnipeg Jets (1980–81)	14–18–9	11,233
42	L	January 12, 1981	2–5	St. Louis Blues (1980–81)	14–19–9	11,118
43	L	January 14, 1981	4–5	Los Angeles Kings (1980–81)	14–20–9	11,455
44	L	January 17, 1981	2–3	Chicago Black Hawks (1980–81)	14–21–9	13,131
45	L	January 18, 1981	2–3	@ Washington Capitals (1980–81)	14–22–9	10,036
46	T	January 21, 1981	6–6	St. Louis Blues (1980–81)	14–22–10	9,484
47	L	January 23, 1981	2–4	Calgary Flames (1980–81)	14–23–10	10,206
48	L	January 24, 1981	4–7	@ Toronto Maple Leafs (1980–81)	14–24–10	16,485
49	W	January 28, 1981	6–3	Colorado Rockies (1980–81)	15–24–10	12,510
50	T	January 30, 1981	5–5	Toronto Maple Leafs (1980–81)	15–24–11	10,667
51	L	January 31, 1981	3–5	Buffalo Sabres (1980–81)	15–25–11	12,425

February

Game	Result	Date	Score	Opponent	Record	Attendance
52	L	February 2, 1981	2–4	@ Quebec Nordiques (1980–81)	15–26–11	12,435
53	T	February 4, 1981	3–3	Boston Bruins (1980–81)	15–26–12	13,149
54	L	February 7, 1981	2–6	Chicago Black Hawks (1980–81)	15–27–12	12,327
55	T	February 8, 1981	6–6	@ Philadelphia Flyers (1980–81)	15–27–13	17,077
56	T	February 12, 1981	2–2	@ Detroit Red Wings (1980–81)	15–27–14	11,175
57	L	February 14, 1981	4–7	@ Minnesota North Stars (1980–81)	15–28–14	13,158
58	T	February 15, 1981	4–4	@ Chicago Black Hawks (1980–81)	15–28–15	12,571
59	T	February 18, 1981	3–3	Winnipeg Jets (1980–81)	15–28–16	14,096
60	L	February 19, 1981	2–6	@ Pittsburgh Penguins (1980–81)	15–29–16	6,571
61	W	February 22, 1981	6–5	New York Rangers (1980–81)	16–29–16	13,663
62	W	February 25, 1981	3–2	Minnesota North Stars (1980–81)	17–29–16	11,202
63	L	February 27, 1981	1–5	@ Calgary Flames (1980–81)	17–30–16	7,226

March

Game	Result	Date	Score	Opponent	Record	Attendance
64	L	March 1, 1981	0–3	@ Vancouver Canucks (1980–81)	17–31–16	12,616
65	L	March 3, 1981	4–5	@ Colorado Rockies (1980–81)	17–32–16	5,239
66	W	March 6, 1981	5–3	@ Buffalo Sabres (1980–81)	18–32–16	16,383
67	L	March 8, 1981	4–5	Calgary Flames (1980–81)	18–33–16	10,171
68	T	March 10, 1981	4–4	@ Detroit Red Wings (1980–81)	18–33–17	13,217
69	L	March 11, 1981	2–5	Washington Capitals (1980–81)	18–34–17	10,962
70	L	March 14, 1981	2–6	@ New York Rangers (1980–81)	18–35–17	17,405
71	L	March 15, 1981	2–4	@ Boston Bruins (1980–81)	18–36–17	10,865
72	W	March 18, 1981	9–3	Montreal Canadiens (1980–81)	19–36–17	12,092
73	L	March 21, 1981	4–6	New York Rangers (1980–81)	19–37–17	14,510
74	T	March 22, 1981	3–3	Toronto Maple Leafs (1980–81)	19–37–18	10,620
75	L	March 25, 1981	2–7	Edmonton Oilers (1980–81)	19–38–18	11,405
76	W	March 27, 1981	5–3	@ Washington Capitals (1980–81)	20–38–18	12,201
77	L	March 29, 1981	1–4	Philadelphia Flyers (1980–81)	20–39–18	12,350

April

Game	Result	Date	Score	Opponent	Record	Attendance
78	W	April 1, 1981	5–4	Quebec Nordiques (1980–81)	21–39–18	10,734
79	L	April 3, 1981	1–6	@ Montreal Canadiens (1980–81)	21–40–18	16,978
80	L	April 5, 1981	4–5	Pittsburgh Penguins (1980–81)	21–41–18	13,059

Legend: Win (2 points) Loss (0 points) Tie (1 point)

== Transactions ==
The Whalers were involved in the following transactions during the 1980–81 season.

=== Trades ===
June 5, 1980	To Montreal Canadiens 3rd-round pick in 1981 – Dieter Hegen; 5th-round pick in 1981 – Steve Rooney	To Hartford Whalers Rick Meagher; 3rd-round pick in 1981 – Paul MacDermid; 5th-round pick in 1981 NHL entry draft – Dan Bourbonnais
June 14, 1980	To Chicago Black Hawks 2nd-round pick in 1981	To Hartford Whalers Mike Veisor
September 4, 1980	To Colorado Rockies Al Smith	To Hartford Whalers Cash Considerations
November 20, 1980	To Philadelphia Flyers 2nd-round pick in 1982 – Peter Ihnacak	To Hartford Whalers Jack McIlhargey; Player to be Named Later – Norm Barnes on Dec. 5, 1980
December 16, 1980	To Minnesota North Stars Gordie Roberts	To Hartford Whalers Mike Fidler
January 15, 1981	To New York Rangers Nick Fotiu	To Hartford Whalers 5th-round pick in 1981 – Bill Maguire
February 1, 1981	To Calgary Flames Future Considerations	To Hartford Whalers John Stewart
February 20, 1981	To Pittsburgh Penguins 6th-round pick in 1981 – Paul Edwards	To Hartford Whalers Gilles Lupien

=== Waivers ===
August 7, 1980	From New York Rangers Warren Miller

=== Free agents ===
Player	Former team
Thommy Abrahamsson	Leksands IF (Sweden)
Randy MacGregor	EC VSV (Austria)
Ross Yates	Mount Allison University (AUAA)

== Draft picks ==
Hartford's draft picks from the 1980 NHL entry draft which was held at the Montreal Forum in Montreal on June 11, 1980.

Round	#	Player	Nationality	College/junior/club team (league)
1	8	Fred Arthur	Canada	Cornwall Royals (QMJHL)
2	29	Michel Galarneau	Canada	Hull Olympiques (QMJHL)
3	50	Mickey Volcan	Canada	University of North Dakota (WCHA)
4	71	Kevin McClelland	Canada	Niagara Falls Flyers (OMJHL)
5	92	Darren Jensen	Canada	University of North Dakota (WCHA)
6	113	Mario Cerri	Canada	Ottawa 67's (OMJHL)
7	134	Mike Martin	Canada	Sudbury Wolves (OMJHL)
8	155	Brent DeNat	Canada	Michigan Tech (WCHA)
9	176	Paul Fricker	Canada	University of Michigan (WCHA)
10	197	Lorne Bokshowan	Canada	Saskatoon Blades (WHL)

== See also ==
- 1980–81 NHL season
