= 1980–81 Quebec Nordiques season =

National Hockey League team season

1980–81 Quebec Nordiques
- Division: 4th Adams
- Conference: 6th Wales
- 1980–81 record: 30–32–18
- Home record: 18–11–11
- Road record: 12–21–7
- Goals for: 314
- Goals against: 318

Team information
- General manager: Maurice Filion
- Coach: Maurice Filion (1-3-2); Michel Bergeron (29-29-16)
- Captain: Marc Tardif; Robbie Ftorek
- Arena: Colisée de Québec
- Average attendance: 12,243
- Minor league affiliate: Rochester Americans (AHL)

Team leaders
- Goals: Jacques Richard (52)
- Assists: Peter Stastny (70)
- Points: Peter Stastny (109)
- Penalty minutes: Dale Hunter (226)
- Plus/minus: Mario Marois (+11)
- Wins: Dan Bouchard (19)
- Goals against average: Dan Bouchard (3.17)

The 1980–81 Quebec Nordiques season was the Nordiques second season in the National Hockey League (NHL). Quebec improved on their inaugural NHL season, making the playoffs, only to lose in the first round.

== Off-season ==
During the off-season, the Nordiques fired head coach Jacques Demers, and general manager Maurice Filion would begin the season as the head coach. This would mark Filion's third time behind the Nordiques bench, as he was the head coach of the club in the 1972–73 WHA season, and he served as an interim head coach at the end of the 1977–78 season. Quebec was able to sign brothers Peter Šťastný and Anton Šťastný, who both defected from Czechoslovakia. The brothers would have a huge impact in the league, as Peter would win the Calder Memorial Trophy awarded to the NHL's Rookie of the Year, and both Peter and Anton would set rookie records, each earning eight points in a game on February 22, 1981, leading Quebec to an 11–7 win over the Washington Capitals.

== Regular season ==
The Nordiques season began with a nine-game road trip, and head coach Maurice Filion would replace himself with Michel Bergeron after the club had a 1-3-2 record in their opening six games. Quebec continued to struggle, and fifteen games into the season, they had a 1-9-5 record. The Nordiques would continue to struggle, and found themselves a season high fourteen games under .500 with an 11-26-12 record after 49 games. Quebec would then get red hot, posting a record of 19-6-6 in their remaining 31 games to finish the season at 30–32–18, earning 78 points, and their first ever berth into the NHL playoffs.

Offensively, the Nordiques were led by rookie Peter Šťastný, who set a team record with 109 points, winning the Calder Memorial Trophy. Jacques Richard became the first Nordique to score over 50 goals in a season, as he scored 52, and registered 103 points. Anton Šťastný also had a great rookie season, earning 85 points, while Robbie Ftorek and Michel Goulet had 75 and 73 points respectively. Pierre Lacroix led the Nordiques blueline, earning 39 points, while Dale Hunter had a team high 226 penalty minutes.

In goal, Dan Bouchard emerged as the number one goalie late in the season, winning a team record 19 games, while posting a team best 3.17 GAA, along with two shutouts. Michel Plasse had the most playing time, and he won 10 games with a 3.66 GAA in 33 games.

=== Season standings ===
Adams Division
	GP	W	L	T	GF	GA	Pts
**Buffalo Sabres**	80	39	20	21	327	250	99
**Boston Bruins**	80	37	30	13	316	272	87
**Minnesota North Stars**	80	35	28	17	291	263	87
**Quebec Nordiques**	80	30	32	18	314	318	78
**Toronto Maple Leafs**	80	28	37	15	322	367	71

Note: GP = Games played, W = Wins, L = Losses, T = Ties, Pts = Points, GF = Goals for, GA = Goals against
Note: Teams that qualified for the playoffs are highlighted in bold.

League standings
R		Div	GP	W	L	T	GF	GA	Pts
1	**p – New York Islanders**	PTK	80	48	18	14	355	260	110
2	**x – St. Louis Blues**	SMY	80	45	18	17	352	281	107
3	**y – Montreal Canadiens**	NRS	80	45	22	13	332	232	103
4	**Los Angeles Kings**	NRS	80	43	24	13	337	290	99
5	**x – Buffalo Sabres**	ADM	80	39	20	21	327	250	99
6	**Philadelphia Flyers**	PTK	80	41	24	15	313	249	97
7	**Calgary Flames**	PTK	80	39	27	14	329	298	92
8	**Boston Bruins**	ADM	80	37	30	13	316	272	87
9	**Minnesota North Stars**	ADM	80	35	28	17	291	263	87
10	**Chicago Black Hawks**	SMY	80	31	33	16	304	315	78
11	**Quebec Nordiques**	ADM	80	30	32	18	314	318	78
12	**Vancouver Canucks**	SMY	80	28	32	20	289	301	76
13	**New York Rangers**	PTK	80	30	36	14	312	317	74
14	**Edmonton Oilers**	SMY	80	29	35	16	328	327	74
15	**Pittsburgh Penguins**	NRS	80	30	37	13	302	345	73
16	**Toronto Maple Leafs**	ADM	80	28	37	15	322	367	71
17	Washington Capitals	PTK	80	26	36	18	286	317	70
18	Hartford Whalers	NRS	80	21	41	18	292	372	60
19	Colorado Rockies	SMY	80	22	45	13	258	344	57
20	Detroit Red Wings	NRS	80	19	43	18	252	339	56
21	Winnipeg Jets	SMY	80	9	57	14	246	400	32

Divisions: ADM – Adams, NRS – Norris, PTK – Patrick, SMY – Smythe

bold – The top 16 teams in the league qualified for the playoffs, regardless of division or conference.
x – Won division; y – Won Conference (and division); p – Won Presidents' Trophy (and conference and division)

=== Record vs. opponents ===
Adams Division record vs. opponents

==== Vs. Wales Conference ====
**Vs. Adams Division**

1980–81 NHL records
Team	**BOS**	**BUF**	**MIN**	**QUE**	**TOR**	**Total**
Boston	—	2–1–1	2–1–1	1–3	1–1–2	**6–6–4**
Buffalo	1–2–1	—	0–1–3	3–0–1	3–1	**7–4–5**
Minnesota	1–2–1	1–0–3	—	2–2	0–4	**4–8–4**
Quebec	3–1	0–3–1	2–2	—	0–2–2	**5–8–3**
Toronto	1–1–2	1–3	4–0	2–0–2	—	**8–4–4**

**Vs. Norris Division**

1980–81 NHL records
Team	**DET**	**HFD**	**LAK**	**MTL**	**PIT**	**Total**
Boston	2−0−2	1−1−2	2−2	1−3	3−0−1	**9–6–5**
Buffalo	3−0−1	2−1−1	2−1−1	1−3	3−0−1	**11–5–4**
Minnesota	2−0−2	3−1	0−4	2−1−1	3−1	**10–7–3**
Quebec	3−0−1	2−2	1−3	1−1−2	1−2–1	**8–8–4**
Toronto	1−3	1–1−2	0−3−1	1−3	2−1–1	**5–11–4**

==== Vs. Campbell Conference ====
**Vs. Patrick Division**

1980–81 NHL records
Team	**CGY**	**NYI**	**NYR**	**PHI**	**WSH**	**Total**
Boston	1–3	2–2	2–2	2–2	2–1–1	**9–10–1**
Buffalo	2–1–1	2–2	2–1–1	2–0–2	2–0–2	**10–4–6**
Minnesota	2–2	0–2–2	1–1–2	1–2–1	3–0–1	**7–7–6**
Quebec	1–1–2	1–3	1–1–2	2–1–1	4–0	**9–6–5**
Toronto	2–2	1–3	2–2	2–0–2	1–3	**8–10–2**

**Vs. Smythe Division**

1980–81 NHL records
Team	**CHI**	**COL**	**EDM**	**STL**	**VAN**	**WIN**	**Total**
Boston	3−1	2−1−1	3−1	1−3	2−2	2−0−2	**13−8−3**
Buffalo	2−2	3–0−1	1−1−2	0−3−1	1−1−2	4−0	**11−7−6**
Minnesota	2−2	2−1–1	2−1−1	2−1–1	2−1−1	4−0	**14−6−4**
Quebec	0−3−1	2−2	3−1	1−2–1	1–1−2	1–1−2	**8−10−6**
Toronto	2−1–1	1−1−2	1−2−1	1−3	0–3−1	2−2	**7−12−5**

== Schedule and results ==
1980–81 regular season
October

Game	Date	Visitor	Score	Home	Record	Points	Attendance
1	October 9	Quebec Nordiques	5–5	Calgary Flames	0–0–1	1	7,243
2	October 10	Quebec Nordiques	7–4	Edmonton Oilers	1–0–1	3	17,334
3	October 12	Quebec Nordiques	2–8	Vancouver Canucks	1–1–1	3	13,130
4	October 14	Quebec Nordiques	1–4	Colorado Rockies	1–2–1	3	4,627
5	October 16	Quebec Nordiques	4–6	Los Angeles Kings	1–3–1	3	6,490
6	October 19	Quebec Nordiques	4–4	Winnipeg Jets	1–3–2	4	12,728
7	October 22	Quebec Nordiques	2–4	Minnesota North Stars	1–4–2	4	11,537
8	October 25	Quebec Nordiques	2–4	Hartford Whalers	1–5–2	4	11,005
9	October 26	Quebec Nordiques	4–7	Chicago Black Hawks	1–6–2	4	8,741
10	October 29	Vancouver Canucks	3–3	Quebec Nordiques	1–6–3	5	N/A

November

Game	Date	Visitor	Score	Home	Record	Points	Attendance
11	November 1	Philadelphia Flyers	3–3	Quebec Nordiques	1–6–4	6	N/A
12	November 2	Colorado Rockies	5–4	Quebec Nordiques	1–7–4	6	10,400
13	November 4	Quebec Nordiques	4–5	Montreal Canadiens	1–8–4	6	16,803
14	November 9	Quebec Nordiques	1–3	Philadelphia Flyers	1–9–4	6	17,077
15	November 11	Chicago Black Hawks	6–6	Quebec Nordiques	1–9–5	7	N/A
16	November 12	Winnipeg Jets	1–5	Quebec Nordiques	2–9–5	9	N/A
17	November 16	Quebec Nordiques	1–8	Buffalo Sabres	2–10–5	9	16,433
18	November 18	Washington Capitals	2–6	Quebec Nordiques	3–10–5	11	9,023
19	November 19	Detroit Red Wings	1–2	Quebec Nordiques	4–10–5	13	9,817
20	November 22	Calgary Flames	3–3	Quebec Nordiques	4–10–6	14	10,185
21	November 24	Los Angeles Kings	4–3	Quebec Nordiques	4–11–6	14	10,690
22	November 26	Minnesota North Stars	2–5	Quebec Nordiques	5–11–6	16	10,290
23	November 30	New York Islanders	7–3	Quebec Nordiques	5–12–6	16	10,159

December

Game	Date	Visitor	Score	Home	Record	Points	Attendance
24	December 2	Quebec Nordiques	2–5	St. Louis Blues	5–13–6	16	9,115
25	December 4	Quebec Nordiques	4–1	Detroit Red Wings	6–13-6	18	9,212
26	December 6	Quebec Nordiques	2–5	Toronto Maple Leafs	6–14–6	18	16,485
27	December 7	Toronto Maple Leafs	4–4	Quebec Nordiques	6–14–7	19	9,330
28	December 10	Boston Bruins	6–4	Quebec Nordiques	6–15–7	19	10,693
29	December 11	Quebec Nordiques	5–3	Boston Bruins	7–15–7	21	8,241
30	December 14	Edmonton Oilers	5–6	Quebec Nordiques	8–15–7	23	9,346
31	December 17	St. Louis Blues	1–4	Quebec Nordiques	9–15–7	25	9,805
32	December 20	Quebec Nordiques	2–5	New York Islanders	9–16–7	25	14,942
33	December 21	Hartford Whalers	5–6	Quebec Nordiques	10–16–7	27	10,241
34	December 23	Montreal Canadiens	2–2	Quebec Nordiques	10–16–8	28	10,672
35	December 27	Quebec Nordiques	4–6	Pittsburgh Penguins	10–17–8	28	9,763
36	December 30	New York Rangers	6–3	Quebec Nordiques	10–18–8	28	10,868

January

Game	Date	Visitor	Score	Home	Record	Points	Attendance
37	January 3	Buffalo Sabres	3–3	Quebec Nordiques	10–18–9	29	10,868
38	January 4	Quebec Nordiques	2–2	New York Rangers	10–18–10	30	17,425
39	January 6	Quebec Nordiques	3–6	St. Louis Blues	10–19–10	30	12,080
40	January 7	Quebec Nordiques	1–5	Buffalo Sabres	10–20–10	30	16,433
41	January 10	Quebec Nordiques	5–5	Montreal Canadiens	10–20–11	31	17,199
42	January 11	Edmonton Oilers	6–3	Quebec Nordiques	10–21–11	31	10,532
43	January 13	Winnipeg Jets	3–3	Quebec Nordiques	10–21–12	32	9,425
44	January 15	Quebec Nordiques	4–1	Philadelphia Flyers	11–21–12	34	17,077
45	January 17	Quebec Nordiques	1–7	Minnesota North Stars	11–22–12	34	14,354
46	January 18	Quebec Nordiques	2–7	Chicago Black Hawks	11-23–12	34	11,963
47	January 21	Buffalo Sabres	6–5	Quebec Nordiques	11–24–12	34	14,060
48	January 24	Quebec Nordiques	4–7	New York Islanders	11–25–12	34	15,008
49	January 26	Los Angeles Kings	7–5	Quebec Nordiques	11–26–12	34	13,653
50	January 28	Detroit Red Wings	2–2	Quebec Nordiques	11–26–13	35	14,734
51	January 31	New York Islanders	1–5	Quebec Nordiques	12–26–13	37	14,900

February

Game	Date	Visitor	Score	Home	Record	Points	Attendance
52	February 2	Hartford Whalers	2–4	Quebec Nordiques	13–26–13	39	12,435
53	February 4	Minnesota North Stars	2–6	Quebec Nordiques	14–26–13	41	14,852
54	February 7	Philadelphia Flyers	3–5	Quebec Nordiques	15–26–13	43	14,837
55	February 8	Quebec Nordiques	4–3	Boston Bruins	16–26–13	45	10,865
56	February 12	Quebec Nordiques	3–5	Calgary Flames	16–27–13	45	7,225
57	February 13	Quebec Nordiques	4–2	Edmonton Oilers	17–27–13	47	17,490
58	February 15	Quebec Nordiques	3–4	Winnipeg Jets	17–28–13	47	13,352
59	February 17	Quebec Nordiques	6–3	Colorado Rockies	18–28–13	49	5,817
60	February 18	Quebec Nordiques	4–2	Los Angeles Kings	19–28–13	51	9,841
61	February 20	Quebec Nordiques	9–3	Vancouver Canucks	20–28–13	53	14,879
62	February 22	Quebec Nordiques	11–7	Washington Capitals	21–28–13	55	10,346
63	February 25	Boston Bruins	3–5	Quebec Nordiques	22–28–13	57	14,846

March

Game	Date	Visitor	Score	Home	Record	Points	Attendance
64	March 2	Pittsburgh Penguins	5-4	Quebec Nordiques	22–29–13	57	14,743
65	March 4	Washington Capitals	4–7	Quebec Nordiques	23–29–13	59	14,801
66	March 8	Chicago Black Hawks	3–2	Quebec Nordiques	23–30-13	59	14,467
67	March 10	New York Rangers	4–6	Quebec Nordiques	24–30–13	61	14,826
68	March 11	St. Louis Blues	5–5	Quebec Nordiques	24–30–14	62	14,820
69	March 14	Quebec Nordiques	3–3	Pittsburgh Penguins	24–30–15	63	14,836
70	March 15	Colorado Rockies	0–3	Quebec Nordiques	25–30–15	65	14,499
71	March 17	Quebec Nordiques	4-3	Detroit Red Wings	26–30-15	67	14,150
72	March 18	Quebec Nordiques	6–4	Washington Capitals	27–30–15	69	8,520
73	March 22	Quebec Nordiques	7–7	New York Rangers	27–30–16	70	17,414
74	March 23	Vancouver Canucks	3–3	Quebec Nordiques	27–30–17	71	15,002
75	March 25	Calgary Flames	2–4	Quebec Nordiques	28–30–17	73	14,970
76	March 29	Montreal Canadiens	0–4	Quebec Nordiques	29–30–17	75	15,149
77	March 31	Pittsburgh Penguins	1–5	Quebec Nordiques	30–30–17	77	15,118

April

Game	Date	Visitor	Score	Home	Record	Points	Attendance
78	April 1	Quebec Nordiques	4–5	Hartford Whalers	30–31–17	77	10,734
79	April 4	Quebec Nordiques	5–5	Toronto Maple Leafs	30–31–18	78	16,485
80	April 5	Toronto Maple Leafs	4–2	Quebec Nordiques	30–32–18	78	15,100

Legend: Win (2 points) Loss (0 points) Tie (1 point)

== Playoffs ==
The Nordiques opened the 1981 Stanley Cup playoffs with a best of five preliminary round against the Philadelphia Flyers. The Flyers finished the season with a 41-24-15 record, earning 97 points, and second place in the Patrick Division. The series opened up with two games at the Philadelphia Spectrum, and in the series opener, the Flyers took a 1–0 lead on a goal by Brian Propp early in the game. The Nordiques Anton Šťastný tied the game, however, the Flyers Bill Barber made it 2–1, and then Brian Propp added a second goal before the first period was over to give the Flyers a 3–1 lead. In the second period, Quebec fought back on goals by Michel Goulet and Dale Hunter to tie the game at 3-3. Philadelphia took control of the game in the third period, as Paul Holmgren and Al Hill made it 5-3 for the Flyers before Anton Šťastný scored his second of the game for Quebec, making it 5-4 Flyers. Bill Barber scored an empty net goal in the last minute, as the Flyers took the series opener 6–4.

In the second game, the Flyers took an early 2–0 lead in the first period on goals by Bill Barber and Mel Bridgman before Peter Šťastný responded for the Nordiques, cutting the Flyers lead to 2–1. Bill Barber added a second goal late in the first period, giving the Flyers a 3–1 lead. Anton Šťastný cut the Flyers lead to 3–2 with a goal early in the second, however, Bill Barber completed the hat trick 5:55 into the period, giving Philadelphia a 4–2 lead. The Flyers Tom Gorence made it 5-2 Philadelphia before Jacques Richard responded for the Nordiques, making it 5–3 after two periods. In the third period, Ken Linseman made it 6-3 for Philadelphia before the Nordiques fought back with two quick goals, one by Dale Hunter and another by Marc Tardif, putting the Nordiques within a goal at 6–5. Philadelphia's Mel Bridgman scored, followed by an empty net goal by Bobby Clarke, as the Flyers took a 2–0 series lead with an 8–5 victory.

The series shifted to Le Colisée for the next two games, and after two scoreless periods, the Nordiques Michel Goulet scored midway through the third to give the Nordiques a 1–0 lead. Peter Šťastný scored late in the game, as Quebec shutout the Flyers 2–0, with Dan Bouchard made 32 saves, earning the victory and shutout.

In the fourth game, the Flyers Terry Murray scored seven seconds into the game, as Philadelphia took an early 1–0 lead. Robbie Ftorek responded for the Nordiques, however, the Flyers Behn Wilson and Tom Gorence added goals in the opening period, as the Flyers took a 3–1 lead. After a scoreless second period, and with the Nordiques facing elimination, Dale Hunter cut into the Flyers lead with a goal with less than five minutes remaining in the third period, making the score 3-2 for Philadelphia. Less than two minutes later, Jacques Richard completed the comeback, as the Nordiques scored to make it 3-3, heading into overtime. In overtime, Dale Hunter scored a quick goal 37 seconds into the extra period, as Quebec stunned the Flyers with a 4–3 win, and tied the series.

The fifth game was played in Philadelphia, and the Flyers opened the scoring on a goal by Rick MacLeish late in the first period. The Nordiques Michel Goulet quickly responded before the period was over, tying the game. In the second period, the Flyers re-took the lead, when Al Hill scored ten minutes into the period, making it 2-1 Philadelphia. In the third period, the Flyers took control of the game, scoring three quick goals to make it 5–1. Quebec's Anton Šťastný scored to make it 5–2, however, that would be as close of the Nordiques got, as the Flyers won the game and took the series.

1981 Stanley Cup playoffs
Preliminary Round vs. (6) Philadelphia Flyers – Flyers win 3–2

Game	Date	Visitor	Score	Home	Series	Attendance
1	April 8	Quebec Nordiques	4–6	Philadelphia Flyers	0-1	17,077
2	April 9	Quebec Nordiques	5–8	Philadelphia Flyers	0-2	17,077
3	April 11	Philadelphia Flyers	0–2	Quebec Nordiques	1-2	15,081
4	April 12	Philadelphia Flyers	3–4	Quebec Nordiques	2-2	15,130
5	April 14	Quebec Nordiques	2–5	Philadelphia Flyers	2-3	17,077

Legend: Win Loss

== Player statistics ==
=== Scoring leaders ===
Regular season
Player	GP	G	A	Pts	PIM
Peter Stastny	77	39	70	109	37
Jacques Richard	78	52	51	103	39
Anton Stastny	80	39	46	85	12
Robbie Ftorek	78	24	49	73	104
Michel Goulet	76	32	39	71	45

Playoffs
Player	GP	G	A	Pts	PIM
Peter Stastny	5	2	8	10	7
Anton Stastny	5	4	3	7	2
Michel Goulet	4	3	4	7	7
Dale Hunter	5	4	2	6	34
Jacques Richard	5	2	4	6	14

=== Goaltending ===
Regular season
Player	GP	Min	W	L	T	GA	SO	GAA
Dan Bouchard	29	1740	19	5	5	92	2	3.17
Michel Plasse	33	1933	10	14	9	118	0	3.66
Michel Dion	12	688	0	8	3	61	0	5.32
Ron Grahame	8	439	1	5	1	40	0	5.47

Playoffs
Player	GP	Min	W	L	GA	SO	GAA
Dan Bouchard	5	286	2	3	19	1	3.99
Michel Plasse	1	15	0	0	1	0	4.00

== Awards ==
- Calder Memorial Trophy: Peter Šťastný

== Transactions ==
The Nordiques were involved in the following transactions during the 1980–81 season.

=== Trades ===
August 11, 1980	To Philadelphia Flyers Cash	To Quebec Nordiques John Paddock
September 15, 1980	To Philadelphia Flyers 7th round pick in 1981 – Vladimir Svitek; Cash	To Quebec Nordiques Andre Dupont
October 8, 1980	To Winnipeg Jets Danny Geoffrion	To Quebec Nordiques Cash
December 12, 1980	To Los Angeles Kings Cash	To Quebec Nordiques Ron Grahame
January 30, 1981	To Calgary Flames Jamie Hislop	To Quebec Nordiques Dan Bouchard
February 10, 1981	To Winnipeg Jets Michel Dion	To Quebec Nordiques Cash
March 10, 1981	To Vancouver Canucks Garry Lariviere	To Quebec Nordiques Mario Marois
June 9, 1981	To Minnesota North Stars Nelson Burton	To Quebec Nordiques Dan Chicoine

=== Waivers ===
October 10, 1980	To Edmonton Oilers Curt Brackenbury
October 10, 1980	From Boston Bruins John Wensink

=== Free agents ===
Player	Former team
Peter Šťastný	Slovan Bratislava (Czechoslovakia)
Louis Sleigher	Syracuse Firebirds (AHL)
Michel Plasse	Colorado Rockies
Pierre Aubry	Trois-Rivières Draveurs (QMJHL)
Marian Stastny	Slovan Bratislava (Czechoslovakia)

Player	New team
Paul Baxter	Pittsburgh Penguins
Gerry Hart	St. Louis Blues

== Draft picks ==
Quebec's draft picks from the 1980 NHL entry draft which was held at the Montreal Forum in Montreal.

Round	#	Player	Nationality	College/junior/club team (league)
2	24	Normand Rochefort	Canada	Quebec Remparts (QMJHL)
4	66	Jay Miller	United States	University of New Hampshire (NCAA)
5	87	Basil McRae	Canada	London Knights (OMJHL)
6	108	Mark Kumpel	United States	University of Lowell (NCAA)
7	129	Gaston Therrien	Canada	Quebec Remparts (QMJHL)
8	150	Michel Bolduc	Canada	Chicoutimi Saguenéens (QMJHL)
9	171	Christian Tanguay	Canada	Trois-Rivières Draveurs (QMJHL)
10	192	Bill Robinson	United States	Acton-Boxborough Regional High School (USHS)
