= 1980–81 Pittsburgh Penguins season =

NHL team season

1980–81 Pittsburgh Penguins
- Division: 3rd Norris
- Conference: 7th Wales
- 1980–81 record: 30–37–13
- Home record: 21–16–3
- Road record: 9–21–10
- Goals for: 302
- Goals against: 345

Team information
- General manager: Baz Bastien
- Coach: Eddie Johnston
- Captain: Orest Kindrachuk (to Jan 31); Randy Carlyle (from Jan 31)
- Alternate captains: None
- Arena: Pittsburgh Civic Arena

Team leaders
- Goals: Rick Kehoe (55)
- Assists: Randy Carlyle (67)
- Points: Rick Kehoe (88)
- Penalty minutes: Paul Baxter (204)
- Wins: Greg Millen (25)
- Goals against average: Nick Ricci (3.89)

The 1980–81 Pittsburgh Penguins season was their 14th in the National Hockey League (NHL).

== Regular season ==
=== Division standings ===
Norris Division
	GP	W	L	T	GF	GA	Pts
**Montreal Canadiens**	80	45	22	13	332	232	103
**Los Angeles Kings**	80	43	24	13	337	290	99
**Pittsburgh Penguins**	80	30	37	13	302	345	73
Hartford Whalers	80	21	41	18	292	372	60
Detroit Red Wings	80	19	43	18	252	339	56

Note: GP = Games played, W = Wins, L = Losses, T = Ties, Pts = Points, GF = Goals for, GA = Goals against
Note: Teams that qualified for the playoffs are highlighted in bold.

League standings
R		Div	GP	W	L	T	GF	GA	Pts
1	**p – New York Islanders**	PTK	80	48	18	14	355	260	110
2	**x – St. Louis Blues**	SMY	80	45	18	17	352	281	107
3	**y – Montreal Canadiens**	NRS	80	45	22	13	332	232	103
4	**Los Angeles Kings**	NRS	80	43	24	13	337	290	99
5	**x – Buffalo Sabres**	ADM	80	39	20	21	327	250	99
6	**Philadelphia Flyers**	PTK	80	41	24	15	313	249	97
7	**Calgary Flames**	PTK	80	39	27	14	329	298	92
8	**Boston Bruins**	ADM	80	37	30	13	316	272	87
9	**Minnesota North Stars**	ADM	80	35	28	17	291	263	87
10	**Chicago Black Hawks**	SMY	80	31	33	16	304	315	78
11	**Quebec Nordiques**	ADM	80	30	32	18	314	318	78
12	**Vancouver Canucks**	SMY	80	28	32	20	289	301	76
13	**New York Rangers**	PTK	80	30	36	14	312	317	74
14	**Edmonton Oilers**	SMY	80	29	35	16	328	327	74
15	**Pittsburgh Penguins**	NRS	80	30	37	13	302	345	73
16	**Toronto Maple Leafs**	ADM	80	28	37	15	322	367	71
17	Washington Capitals	PTK	80	26	36	18	286	317	70
18	Hartford Whalers	NRS	80	21	41	18	292	372	60
19	Colorado Rockies	SMY	80	22	45	13	258	344	57
20	Detroit Red Wings	NRS	80	19	43	18	252	339	56
21	Winnipeg Jets	SMY	80	9	57	14	246	400	32

Divisions: ADM – Adams, NRS – Norris, PTK – Patrick, SMY – Smythe

bold – The top 16 teams in the league qualified for the playoffs, regardless of division or conference.
x – Won division; y – Won Conference (and division); p – Won Presidents' Trophy (and conference and division)

=== Record vs. opponents ===
Norris Division record vs. opponents

==== Vs. Wales Conference ====
**Vs. Norris Division**

1980–81 NHL records
Team	**DET**	**HFD**	**LAK**	**MTL**	**PIT**	**Total**
Detroit	—	0−2−2	1−3	1−3	1−2−1	**3−10−3**
Hartford	2−0−2	—	0−3−1	1−3	2−2	**5−8−3**
Los Angeles	3−1	3−0−1	—	1−3	0−2−2	**7−6−3**
Montreal	3−1	3−1	3−1	—	2−2	**11−5−0**
Pittsburgh	2−1−1	2−2	2−0−2	2−2	—	**8−5−3**

**Vs. Adams Division**

1980–81 NHL records
Team	**BOS**	**BUF**	**MIN**	**QUE**	**TOR**	**Total**
Detroit	0−2−2	0−3−1	0−2−2	0−3−1	3−1	**3−11−6**
Hartford	1−1−2	1−2−1	1−3	2−2	1−1−2	**6−9−5**
Los Angeles	2−2	1−2−1	4−0	3−1	3−0−1	**13−5−2**
Montreal	3−1	3−1	1−2−1	1−1−2	3−1	**11−6−3**
Pittsburgh	0−3−1	0−3−1	1−3	2−1−1	1−2−1	**4−12−4**

==== Vs. Campbell Conference ====
**Vs. Patrick Division**

1980–81 NHL records
Team	**CGY**	**NYI**	**NYR**	**PHI**	**WSH**	**Total**
Detroit	1−2−1	0−4	2−1−1	1−3	1−2−1	**5−12−3**
Hartford	1−3	0−2−2	1−3	0−3−1	1−3	**3−14−3**
Los Angeles	1−3	2−2	3−1	0−4	2−1−1	**8−11−1**
Montreal	2−1−1	1−2−1	2−1−1	2−1−1	2−0−2	**9−5−6**
Pittsburgh	1−2−1	2−1−1	2−1−1	0−4	2−1−1	**7−9−4**

**Vs. Smythe Division**

1980–81 NHL records
Team	**CHI**	**COL**	**EDM**	**STL**	**VAN**	**WIN**	**Total**
Detroit	1−1−2	2−1−1	1−2−1	0−4	1−2−1	3−0−1	**8−10−6**
Hartford	0−3−1	2−1−1	1−2−1	0−3−1	1−1−2	3−0−1	**7−10−7**
Los Angeles	2−0−2	3−0−1	2−0−2	0−2−2	4−0	4−0	**15−2−7**
Montreal	2−2	4−0	2−2	1−1−2	2−0−2	3−1	**14−6−4**
Pittsburgh	1−3	3−1	1−2−1	2−2	0−3−1	4−0	**11−11−2**

== Schedule and results ==
1980–81 regular season
October: 4–5–1 (home: 2–3–0; road: 2–2–1), 9 points

#	Date	Visitor	Score	Home	Location	Record	Points
1	Oct 9	Pittsburgh Penguins	4–7	Philadelphia Flyers	The Spectrum	0–1–0	0
2	Oct 11	Winnipeg Jets	4–5	Pittsburgh Penguins	Civic Arena	1–1–0	2
3	Oct 12	Pittsburgh Penguins	6–3	New York Rangers	Madison Square Garden (IV)	2–1–0	4
4	Oct 15	Hartford Whalers	5–2	Pittsburgh Penguins	Civic Arena	2–2–0	4
5	Oct 18	Buffalo Sabres	4–2	Pittsburgh Penguins	Civic Arena	2–3–0	4
6	Oct 21	Pittsburgh Penguins	5–8	Toronto Maple Leafs	Maple Leaf Gardens	2–4–0	4
7	Oct 22	St. Louis Blues	3–9	Pittsburgh Penguins	Civic Arena	3–4–0	6
8	Oct 25	Calgary Flames	8–2	Pittsburgh Penguins	Civic Arena	3–5–0	6
9	Oct 29	Pittsburgh Penguins	1–1	Buffalo Sabres	Buffalo Memorial Auditorium	3–5–1	7
10	Oct 31	Pittsburgh Penguins	6–5	Winnipeg Jets	Winnipeg Arena	4–5–1	9

November: 2–8–3 (home: 2–6–0; road: 0–2–3), 7 points

#	Date	Visitor	Score	Home	Location	Record	Points
11	Nov 1	Pittsburgh Penguins	3–6	Minnesota North Stars	Met Center	4–6–1	9
12	Nov 3	Pittsburgh Penguins	4–4	Edmonton Oilers	Northlands Coliseum	4–6–2	10
13	Nov 5	Toronto Maple Leafs	2–1	Pittsburgh Penguins	Civic Arena	4–7–2	10
14	Nov 8	Detroit Red Wings	3–5	Pittsburgh Penguins	Civic Arena	5–7–2	12
15	Nov 9	Pittsburgh Penguins	4–7	Boston Bruins	Boston Garden	5–8–2	12
16	Nov 12	Washington Capitals	3–1	Pittsburgh Penguins	Civic Arena	5–9–2	12
17	Nov 14	Pittsburgh Penguins	3–3	New York Rangers	Madison Square Garden (IV)	5–9–3	13
18	Nov 15	Boston Bruins	7–4	Pittsburgh Penguins	Civic Arena	5–10–3	13
19	Nov 19	Minnesota North Stars	3–2	Pittsburgh Penguins	Civic Arena	5–11–3	13
20	Nov 22	Colorado Rockies	2–4	Pittsburgh Penguins	Civic Arena	6–11–3	15
21	Nov 26	Vancouver Canucks	7–4	Pittsburgh Penguins	Civic Arena	6–12–3	15
22	Nov 27	Pittsburgh Penguins	3–3	Boston Bruins	Boston Garden	6–12–4	16
23	Nov 29	New York Rangers	4–2	Pittsburgh Penguins	Civic Arena	6–13–4	16

December: 5–6–3 (home: 3–1–0; road: 2–5–3), 13 points

#	Date	Visitor	Score	Home	Location	Record	Points
24	Dec 3	Pittsburgh Penguins	4–4	Toronto Maple Leafs	Maple Leaf Gardens	6–13–5	17
25	Dec 4	Pittsburgh Penguins	3–2	Montreal Canadiens	Montreal Forum	7–13–5	19
26	Dec 6	Chicago Black Hawks	4–6	Pittsburgh Penguins	Civic Arena	8–13–5	21
27	Dec 7	Pittsburgh Penguins	1–10	Buffalo Sabres	Buffalo Memorial Auditorium	8–14–5	21
28	Dec 10	Montreal Canadiens	3–4	Pittsburgh Penguins	Civic Arena	9–14–5	23
29	Dec 12	Pittsburgh Penguins	6–2	Washington Capitals	Capital Centre	10–14–5	25
30	Dec 13	Philadelphia Flyers	6–5	Pittsburgh Penguins	Civic Arena	10–15–5	25
31	Dec 17	Pittsburgh Penguins	3–3	Los Angeles Kings	The Forum	10–15–6	26
32	Dec 19	Pittsburgh Penguins	4–10	Vancouver Canucks	Pacific Coliseum	10–16–6	26
33	Dec 20	Pittsburgh Penguins	3–3	Calgary Flames	Stampede Corral	10–16–7	27
34	Dec 23	Pittsburgh Penguins	3–6	St. Louis Blues	The Checkerdome	10–17–7	27
35	Dec 26	Pittsburgh Penguins	7–9	Hartford Whalers	XL Center	10–18–7	27
36	Dec 27	Quebec Nordiques	4–6	Pittsburgh Penguins	Civic Arena	11–18–7	29
37	Dec 31	Pittsburgh Penguins	1–3	Detroit Red Wings	Joe Louis Arena	11–19–7	29

January: 6–6–1 (home: 6–2–1; road: 0–4–0), 13 points

#	Date	Visitor	Score	Home	Location	Record	Points
38	Jan 3	Detroit Red Wings	4–6	Pittsburgh Penguins	Civic Arena	12–19–7	31
39	Jan 4	Pittsburgh Penguins	2–3	Chicago Black Hawks	Chicago Stadium	12–20–7	31
40	Jan 7	New York Islanders	3–7	Pittsburgh Penguins	Civic Arena	13–20–7	33
41	Jan 8	Pittsburgh Penguins	2–4	Montreal Canadiens	Montreal Forum	13–21–7	33
42	Jan 10	Chicago Black Hawks	5–3	Pittsburgh Penguins	Civic Arena	13–22–7	33
43	Jan 13	Pittsburgh Penguins	3–6	New York Islanders	Nassau Veterans Memorial Coliseum	13–23–7	33
44	Jan 14	St. Louis Blues	3–6	Pittsburgh Penguins	Civic Arena	14–23–7	35
45	Jan 17	Los Angeles Kings	4–5	Pittsburgh Penguins	Civic Arena	15–23–7	37
46	Jan 21	Philadelphia Flyers	5–0	Pittsburgh Penguins	Civic Arena	15–24–7	37
47	Jan 24	Calgary Flames	3–4	Pittsburgh Penguins	Civic Arena	16–24–7	39
48	Jan 27	Pittsburgh Penguins	1–7	St. Louis Blues	The Checkerdome	16–25–7	39
49	Jan 28	Minnesota North Stars	1–3	Pittsburgh Penguins	Civic Arena	17–25–7	41
50	Jan 31	Washington Capitals	4–4	Pittsburgh Penguins	Civic Arena	17–25–8	42

February: 7–5–1 (home: 5–1–1; road: 2–4–0), 15 points

#	Date	Visitor	Score	Home	Location	Record	Points
51	Feb 2	Pittsburgh Penguins	4–8	Chicago Black Hawks	Chicago Stadium	17–26–8	42
52	Feb 4	Pittsburgh Penguins	3–2	Winnipeg Jets	Winnipeg Arena	18–26–8	44
53	Feb 6	Pittsburgh Penguins	4–6	Colorado Rockies	McNichols Sports Arena	18–27–8	44
54	Feb 7	Pittsburgh Penguins	4–5	Calgary Flames	Stampede Corral	18–28–8	44
55	Feb 12	New York Islanders	3–5	Pittsburgh Penguins	Civic Arena	19–28–8	46
56	Feb 14	Vancouver Canucks	2–2	Pittsburgh Penguins	Civic Arena	19–28–9	47
57	Feb 17	Pittsburgh Penguins	1–4	Philadelphia Flyers	The Spectrum	19–29–9	47
58	Feb 19	Hartford Whalers	2–6	Pittsburgh Penguins	Civic Arena	20–29–9	49
59	Feb 21	Buffalo Sabres	6–1	Pittsburgh Penguins	Civic Arena	20–30–9	49
60	Feb 22	Colorado Rockies	4–9	Pittsburgh Penguins	Civic Arena	21–30–9	51
61	Feb 25	Winnipeg Jets	3–4	Pittsburgh Penguins	Civic Arena	22–30–9	53
62	Feb 26	Pittsburgh Penguins	7–5	Washington Capitals	Capital Centre	23–30–9	55
63	Feb 28	New York Rangers	4–6	Pittsburgh Penguins	Civic Arena	24–30–9	57

March: 5–6–3 (home: 3–2–1; road: 2–4–2), 13 points

#	Date	Visitor	Score	Home	Location	Record	Points
64	Mar 2	Pittsburgh Penguins	5–4	Quebec Nordiques	Quebec Coliseum	25–30–9	59
65	Mar 4	Los Angeles Kings	5–6	Pittsburgh Penguins	Civic Arena	26–30–9	61
66	Mar 7	Pittsburgh Penguins	5–8	Minnesota North Stars	Met Center	26–31–9	61
67	Mar 8	Edmonton Oilers	4–6	Pittsburgh Penguins	Civic Arena	27–31–9	63
68	Mar 11	Montreal Canadiens	2–1	Pittsburgh Penguins	Civic Arena	27–32–9	63
69	Mar 14	Quebec Nordiques	3–3	Pittsburgh Penguins	Civic Arena	27–32–10	64
70	Mar 16	Pittsburgh Penguins	6–7	Edmonton Oilers	Northlands Coliseum	27–33–10	64
71	Mar 17	Pittsburgh Penguins	3–4	Vancouver Canucks	Pacific Coliseum	27–34–10	64
72	Mar 19	Pittsburgh Penguins	4–4	Los Angeles Kings	The Forum	27–34–11	65
73	Mar 21	Pittsburgh Penguins	3–1	Colorado Rockies	McNichols Sports Arena	28–34–11	67
74	Mar 25	Toronto Maple Leafs	2–5	Pittsburgh Penguins	Civic Arena	29–34–11	69
75	Mar 28	Pittsburgh Penguins	4–4	New York Islanders	Nassau Veterans Memorial Coliseum	29–34–12	70
76	Mar 29	Edmonton Oilers	5–2	Pittsburgh Penguins	Civic Arena	29–35–12	70
77	Mar 31	Pittsburgh Penguins	1–5	Quebec Nordiques	Quebec Coliseum	29–36–12	70

April: 1–1–1 (home: 0–1–0; road: 1–0–1), 3 points

#	Date	Visitor	Score	Home	Location	Record	Points
78	Apr 2	Pittsburgh Penguins	1–1	Detroit Red Wings	Joe Louis Arena	29–36–13	71
79	Apr 4	Boston Bruins	5–2	Pittsburgh Penguins	Civic Arena	29–37–13	71
80	Apr 5	Pittsburgh Penguins	5–4	Hartford Whalers	XL Center	30–37–13	73

Legend: Win (2 points) Loss (0 points) Tie (1 point)

== Playoffs ==
The Penguins lost in the Preliminary round (3–2) versus the St. Louis Blues.

April 8	Pittsburgh Penguins	2–4	St. Louis Blues	Checkerdome	Recap
Greg Malone (1) – 00:15		First period	04:48 – pp – Mike Zuke (1); 15:58 – Tony Currie (1)
Rod Schutt (1) – 13:21		Second period	14:44 – Jorgen Pettersson (1)
No scoring		Third period	19:59 – en – Mike Crombeen (1)
Greg Millen 44 saves / 47 shots		Goalie stats	Mike Liut 24 saves / 26 shots

April 9	Pittsburgh Penguins	6–4	St. Louis Blues	Checkerdome	Recap
No scoring		First period	02:35 – pp – Joe Micheletti (1)
Randy Carlyle (1) – 02:03; Gregg Sheppard (1) – 04:58; Mario Faubert (1) – pp – 06:59; George Ferguson (1) – 11:13		Second period	03:11 – Tony Currie (2)
Rod Schutt (2) – 00:35; Randy Carlyle (2) – 03:06		Third period	10:49 – Blair Chapman (1); 16:04 – pp – Bernie Federko (1)
Greg Millen 19 saves / 23 shots		Goalie stats	Mike Liut 24 saves / 30 shots

April 11	St. Louis Blues	5–4	Pittsburgh Penguins	Pittsburgh Civic Arena	Recap
Brian Sutter (1) – pp – 11:51		First period	07:04 – pp – Rod Schutt (3)
Ralph Klassen (1) – 06:36; Wayne Babych (1) – 09:58; Bernie Federko (2) – pp – 14:38		Second period	08:57 – Mike Bullard (1); 10:31 – Mark Johnson (1)
Bernie Federko (3) – 15:54		Third period	05:08 – pp – Gregg Sheppard (2)
Mike Liut 27 saves / 31 shots		Goalie stats	Greg Millen 27 saves / 32 shots

April 12	St. Louis Blues	3–6	Pittsburgh Penguins	Pittsburgh Civic Arena	Recap
Ralph Klassen (2) – 05:53; Mike Zuke (2) – pp – 07:10		First period	14:52 – pp – Mike Bullard (2)
Mike Zuke (3) – pp – 13:55		Second period	07:45 – pp – Mark Johnson (2); 11:49 – sh – Randy Carlyle (3)
No scoring		Third period	00:44 – Mike Bullard (3); 09:21 – Randy Carlyle (4); 14:02 – Pat Price (1)
Mike Liut 28 saves / 34 shots		Goalie stats	Greg Millen 21 saves / 24 shots

April 14	Pittsburgh Penguins	3–4	2OT	St. Louis Blues	Checkerdome	Recap
Paul Gardner (1) – pp – 07:48		First period		No scoring
George Ferguson (2) – 15:06		Second period		11:17 – Brian Sutter (2); 16:06 – pp – Bernie Federko (4)
Greg Malone (2) – 10:36		Third period		03:34 – Rick Lapointe (1)
No scoring		Second overtime period		05:16 – Mike Crombeen (2)
Greg Millen 48 saves / 52 shots		Goalie stats		Mike Liut 48 saves / 51 shots

St. Louis won series 3–2

== Player statistics ==
Skaters

Regular season
Player	GP	G	A	Pts	+/−	PIM
Rick Kehoe	80	55	33	88	–9	6
Randy Carlyle	76	16	67	83	–16	136
Paul Gardner	62	34	40	74	–5	59
Peter Lee	80	30	34	64	0	86
Rod Schutt	80	25	35	60	–13	55
Mario Faubert	72	8	44	52	–18	188
Greg Malone	62	21	29	50	–14	68
Ross Lonsberry	80	17	33	50	–3	76
George Ferguson	79	25	18	43	–30	42
Ron Stackhouse	74	6	29	35	–11	86
Mark Johnson	73	10	23	33	4	50
Gregg Sheppard	47	11	17	28	–13	49
Paul Baxter	51	5	14	19	–11	204
Pat Hughes^{‡}	58	10	9	19	–9	161
Russ Anderson	34	3	14	17	12	112
Errol Thompson^{†}	34	6	8	14	–9	12
Gary McAdam^{‡}	34	3	9	12	–16	30
Nick Libett	43	6	6	12	2	4
Orest Kindrachuk	13	3	9	12	3	34
Pat Price^{†}	13	0	10	10	2	33
Marc Chorney	8	1	6	7	1	14
Jim Hamilton	20	1	6	7	2	18
Paul Marshall^{‡}	13	3	0	3	–7	4
Mike Bullard	15	1	2	3	–1	19
Dave Burrows^{†}	53	0	2	2	–13	28
Gilles Lupien^{‡}	31	0	1	1	–15	34
Gary Rissling	25	1	0	1	–4	143
Bennett Wolf	24	0	1	1	–1	94
Kim Davis^{‡}	8	1	0	1	–3	4
Tony Feltrin	2	0	0	0	–3	0
Total		302	499	801	—	1,849

Playoffs
Player	GP	G	A	Pts	+/−	PIM
Randy Carlyle	5	4	5	9	0	9
George Ferguson	5	2	6	8	0	9
Gregg Sheppard	5	2	4	6	0	2
Rodney Schutt	5	3	3	6	0	16
Mike Bullard	4	3	3	6	0	0
Greg Malone	5	2	3	5	0	16
Peter Lee	5	0	4	4	0	4
Rick Kehoe	5	0	3	3	0	0
Mark Johnson	5	2	1	3	0	6
Pat Price	5	1	1	2	0	21
Mario Faubert	5	1	1	2	0	4
Ron Stackhouse	4	0	1	1	0	6
Paul Gardner	5	1	0	1	0	8
Paul Baxter	5	0	1	1	0	28
Gary Rissling	5	0	1	1	0	4
Marc Chorney	2	0	1	1	0	2
Ross Lonsberry	5	0	0	0	0	2
Dave Burrows	1	0	0	0	0	0
Jim Hamilton	1	0	0	0	0	0
Total		21	38	59	—	137

Goaltenders

Regular Season
Player	GP	W	L	T	GA	SO
Gregory Millen	63	25	27	10	258	0
Nick Ricci	9	4	5	0	35	0
Robert Holland	10	1	5	3	45	0
Total		30	37	13	338	0

Playoffs
Player	GP	W	L	T	GA	SO
Gregory Millen	5	2	3	0	19	0
Total		2	3	0	19	0

^{†}Denotes player spent time with another team before joining the Penguins. Stats reflect time with the Penguins only.
^{‡}Denotes player was traded mid-season. Stats reflect time with the Penguins only.

== Awards and records ==
- Ron Stackhouse became the first defenseman to score 300 points for the Penguins. He did so in a 7–9 loss to Hartford on November 26.
- Randy Carlyle established a new franchise record for goals (16), assists (67) and points (83) by a defenseman in a season. He topped the previous highs of 15 goals (held by Ron Stackhouse and Darryl Edestrand), 60 assists and 71 points (both held by Ron Stackhouse).
- Rick Kehoe established a new franchise record for goals in a season with 55. He topped the previous high of 53 held by Pierre Larouche.

== Transactions ==
The Penguins were involved in the following transactions during the 1980–81 season:

=== Trades ===
September 26, 1980	To Montreal Canadiens Canadiens option to swap 1983 3rd round picks	To Pittsburgh Penguins Gilles Lupien; Canadiens option to swap 1983 3rd round picks
November 18, 1980	To Toronto Maple Leafs Kim Davis; Paul Marshall	To Pittsburgh Penguins Dave Burrows; Paul Gardner
January 2, 1981	To Washington Capitals 1981 5th round pick	To Pittsburgh Penguins Gary Rissling
January 8, 1981	To Detroit Red Wings Gary McAdam	To Pittsburgh Penguins Errol Thompson
February 20, 1981	To Hartford Whalers Gilles Lupien	To Pittsburgh Penguins 1981 6th round pick
March 10, 1981	To Edmonton Oilers Pat Hughes	To Pittsburgh Penguins Pat Price

=== Additions and subtractions ===
Additions
Player	Former team	Via
Paul Baxter	Quebec Nordiques	free agency (1980-08-07)

Subtractions
Player	New team	Via
Tom Bladon	Edmonton Oilers	free agency (1980-07-10)
Kim Clackson	Quebec Nordiques	compensation for signing of Paul Baxter (1980-08-07)

== Draft picks ==
The 1980 NHL entry draft was held on June 11, 1980, in Montreal.

Round	#	Player	Pos	Nationality	College/Junior/Club team (League)
1	9	Michael Bullard	Center	Canada	Brantford Alexanders (OHA)
3	51	Randy Boyd	Defense	Canada	Ottawa 67's (OHA)
4	72	Tony Feltrin	Defense	Canada	Victoria Cougars (WHL)
5	93	Douglas Shedden	Center	Canada	Sault Ste. Marie Greyhounds (OHA)
6	114	Pat Graham	Left wing	Canada	Niagara Falls Flyers (OHA)
8	156	Robert Geale	Center	Canada	Portland Winter Hawks (WHL)
9	177	Brian Lundberg	Defense	Canada	U. of Michigan (NCAA)
10	198	Steve McKenzie	Defense	Canada	St. Albert Saints (AJHL)
