= Ken Solheim =

Canadian ice hockey player

- Born: March 27, 1961 (age 65) Hythe, Alberta, Canada
- Height: 6 ft 3 in (191 cm)
- Weight: 210 lb (95 kg; 15 st 0 lb)
- Position: Left wing
- Shot: Left
- Played for: Chicago Black Hawks; Minnesota North Stars; Detroit Red Wings; Edmonton Oilers
- NHL draft: 30th overall, 1980; Chicago Black Hawks
- Playing career: 1980–1986

Kenneth Lawrence Solheim (born March 27, 1961) is a Canadian former professional ice hockey forward who played 135 games in the National Hockey League for the Chicago Black Hawks, Detroit Red Wings, Minnesota North Stars and Edmonton Oilers between 1980 and 1986.

Solheim was born in Hythe, Alberta and raised in Grande Prairie, Alberta.

== Career statistics ==
=== Regular season and playoffs ===
			Regular season					Playoffs
Season	Team	League	GP	G	A	Pts	PIM	GP	G	A	Pts	PIM
1977–78	St. Albert Saints	AJHL	60	26	16	42	31	—	—	—	—	—
1977–78	Medicine Hat Tigers	WCHL	—	—	—	—	—	7	0	0	0	0
1978–79	St. Albert Saints	AJHL	60	47	43	90	83	—	—	—	—	—
1979–80	Medicine Hat Tigers	WHL	72	54	33	87	50	13	1	6	7	16
1980–81	Medicine Hat Tigers	WHL	64	68	43	111	87	5	5	4	9	2
1980–81	Chicago Black Hawks	NHL	5	2	0	2	0	—	—	—	—	—
1980–81	Minnesota North Stars	NHL	5	2	1	3	0	2	1	0	1	0
1981–82	Minnesota North Stars	NHL	29	4	5	9	4	1	0	1	1	2
1981–82	Nashville South Stars	CHL	44	23	18	41	40	—	—	—	—	—
1982–83	Minnesota North Stars	NHL	25	2	4	6	4	—	—	—	—	—
1982–83	Birmingham South Stars	CHL	22	14	3	17	4	—	—	—	—	—
1982–83	Detroit Red Wings	NHL	10	0	0	0	2	—	—	—	—	—
1983–84	Adirondack Red Wings	AHL	61	24	20	44	13	7	1	1	2	0
1984–85	Minnesota North Stars	NHL	55	8	10	18	19	—	—	—	—	—
1984–85	Springfield Indians	AHL	17	6	8	14	0	4	2	0	2	2
1985–86	Edmonton Oilers	NHL	6	1	0	1	5	—	—	—	—	—
1985–86	Nova Scotia Oilers	AHL	71	19	27	46	45	—	—	—	—	—
AHL totals			149	49	55	104	58	11	3	1	4	2
NHL totals			135	19	20	39	34	3	1	1	2	2

== Awards ==
- WHL Second All-Star Team – 1980
- WHL First All-Star Team – 1981
