= Peter Wallin =

Swedish ice hockey player

- Born: April 30, 1957 (age 68) Stockholm, Sweden
- Height: 5 ft 9 in (175 cm)
- Weight: 170 lb (77 kg; 12 st 2 lb)
- Position: Right wing
- Shot: Right
- Played for: Djurgårdens IF; New York Rangers; Södertälje SK
- National team: Sweden
- NHL draft: Undrafted
- Playing career: 1974–1991

Rolf Peter Wallin (born April 30, 1957) is a Swedish former professional ice hockey player and coach who played 52 games in the National Hockey League (NHL) with the New York Rangers during the 1980–81 and 1981–82 seasons. The rest of his career, which lasted from 1974 to 1991, was mainly spent in the Swedish Elitserien. As a coach, he was General Manager for Swedish national team during the 1998–99 and 1999–00 seasons.

== Career statistics ==
=== Regular season and playoffs ===
			Regular season					Playoffs
Season	Team	League	GP	G	A	Pts	PIM	GP	G	A	Pts	PIM
1974–75	Djurgårdens IF J20	SWE Jr	14	18	11	29	—	—	—	—	—	—
1974–75	Djurgårdens IF	SWE	1	0	0	0	2	—	—	—	—	—
1975–76	Djurgårdens IF	SWE	12	3	4	7	0	—	—	—	—	—
1976–77	Djurgårdens IF	SWE-2	30	19	30	49	20	—	—	—	—	—
1977–78	Djurgårdens IF	SWE	36	12	16	28	22	—	—	—	—	—
1978–79	Djurgårdens IF	SWE	36	14	20	34	34	6	2	2	4	14
1979–80	Djurgårdens IF	SWE	30	12	15	27	66	—	—	—	—	—
1980–81	Djurgårdens IF	SWE	36	12	13	25	55	—	—	—	—	—
1980–81	New York Rangers	NHL	12	1	5	6	2	14	2	6	8	6
1981–82	New York Rangers	NHL	40	2	9	11	12	—	—	—	—	—
1981–82	Springfield Indians	AHL	16	4	10	14	8	—	—	—	—	—
1982–83	Tulsa Oilers	CHL	65	15	40	55	43	—	—	—	—	—
1983–84	Södertälje SK	SWE	28	12	13	25	38	—	—	—	—	—
1984–85	Södertälje SK	SWE	20	6	7	13	30	8	5	5	10	8
1985–86	Södertälje SK	SWE	31	12	18	30	37	7	3	3	6	4
1990–91	Järfälla HC	SWE-3	4	1	1	2	6	—	—	—	—	—
SWE totals			230	99	132	229	304	21	10	10	20	26
NHL totals			52	3	14	17	14	14	2	6	8	6

=== International ===
Medal record

Representing Sweden

World Championships
Bronze medal – third place	1979 Soviet Union	

Year	Team	Event	GP	G	A	Pts	PIM
1979	Sweden	WC	8	1	3	4	2
Senior totals			8	1	3	4	2
