= Mario Marois =

Canadian former ice hockey defenceman (born 1957)

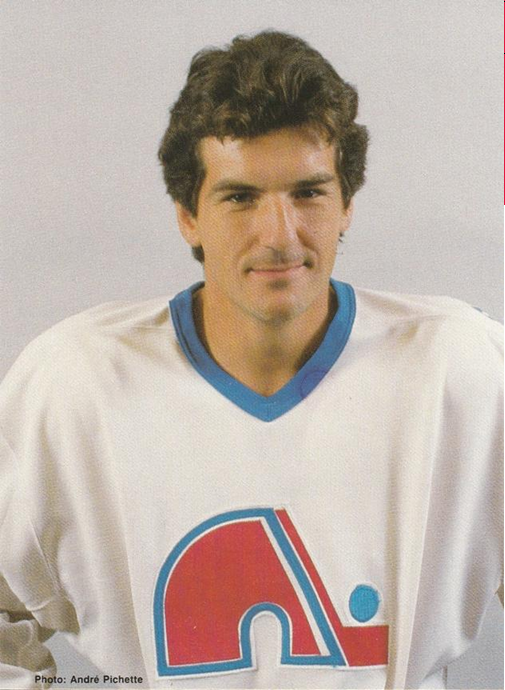
- Born: December 15, 1957 (age 68) L'Ancienne-Lorette, Quebec, Canada
- Height: 5 ft 11 in (180 cm)
- Weight: 190 lb (86 kg; 13 st 8 lb)
- Position: Defence
- Shot: Right
- Played for: New York Rangers; Vancouver Canucks; Quebec Nordiques; Winnipeg Jets; St. Louis Blues
- National team: Canada
- NHL draft: 62nd overall, 1977; New York Rangers
- Playing career: 1977–1993

Mario Marois (born December 15, 1957) is a Canadian former ice hockey defenceman.

== Biography ==
As a youth, Marois played in the 1968, 1969 and 1970 Quebec International Pee-Wee Hockey Tournaments with a minor ice hockey team from L'Ancienne-Lorette, Quebec.

Marois started his National Hockey League career with the New York Rangers in 1978. He also played for the Vancouver Canucks before landing with the Quebec Nordiques. While with the Quebec Nordiques, Marois served as team captain for three years before being traded to the Winnipeg Jets.

He left the NHL after the 1992 season. He served one season as a player-assistant coach of the Hamilton Canucks of the AHL in 1992–93 before retiring as a player.

He worked as a scout with the Carolina Hurricanes and Vancouver Canucks before later becoming an amateur scout with the Detroit Red Wings. He was inducted into the QMJHL Hall of Fame in 2016.

== Career statistics ==
=== Regular season and playoffs ===
			Regular season					Playoffs
Season	Team	League	GP	G	A	Pts	PIM	GP	G	A	Pts	PIM
1974–75	Quebec Remparts	QMJHL	14	0	2	2	18	6	0	0	0	27
1975–76	Quebec Remparts	QMJHL	67	11	42	53	270	15	2	3	5	86
1975–76	Quebec Remparts	M-Cup	—	—	—	—	—	3	0	0	0	7
1976–77	Quebec Remparts	QMJHL	72	17	67	84	234	14	1	17	18	75
1977–78	New Haven Nighthawks	AHL	52	8	23	31	147	12	5	3	8	21
1977–78	New York Rangers	NHL	8	1	1	2	15	1	0	0	0	5
1978–79	New York Rangers	NHL	71	5	26	31	153	18	0	6	6	29
1979–80	New York Rangers	NHL	79	8	23	31	142	9	0	2	2	8
1980–81	New York Rangers	NHL	8	1	2	3	46	—	—	—	—	—
1980–81	Vancouver Canucks	NHL	50	4	12	16	115	—	—	—	—	—
1980–81	Quebec Nordiques	NHL	11	0	7	7	20	5	0	1	1	6
1981–82	Quebec Nordiques	NHL	71	11	32	43	161	13	1	2	3	44
1982–83	Quebec Nordiques	NHL	36	2	12	14	108	—	—	—	—	—
1983–84	Quebec Nordiques	NHL	80	13	36	49	151	9	1	4	5	6
1984–85	Quebec Nordiques	NHL	76	6	37	43	91	18	0	8	8	12
1985–86	Quebec Nordiques	NHL	20	1	12	13	42	—	—	—	—	—
1985–86	Winnipeg Jets	NHL	56	4	28	32	110	3	1	4	5	6
1986–87	Winnipeg Jets	NHL	79	4	40	44	106	10	1	3	4	23
1987–88	Winnipeg Jets	NHL	79	7	44	51	111	5	0	4	4	6
1988–89	Winnipeg Jets	NHL	7	1	1	2	17	—	—	—	—	—
1988–89	Quebec Nordiques	NHL	42	2	11	13	101	—	—	—	—	—
1989–90	Quebec Nordiques	NHL	67	3	15	18	104	—	—	—	—	—
1990–91	St. Louis Blues	NHL	64	2	14	16	81	9	0	0	0	37
1991–92	St. Louis Blues	NHL	17	0	1	1	38	—	—	—	—	—
1991–92	Winnipeg Jets	NHL	34	1	3	4	34	—	—	—	—	—
1992–93	Hamilton Canucks	AHL	68	5	27	32	86	—	—	—	—	—
NHL totals			955	76	357	433	1,746	100	4	34	38	182

=== International ===
Year	Team	Event	GP	G	A	Pts	PIM
1989	Canada	WC	10	0	4	4	6

Preceded by Andre Dupont	Quebec Nordiques captain 1983–85	Succeeded by Peter Stastny
