= Mike Veisor =

Canadian former ice hockey goaltender (born 1952)

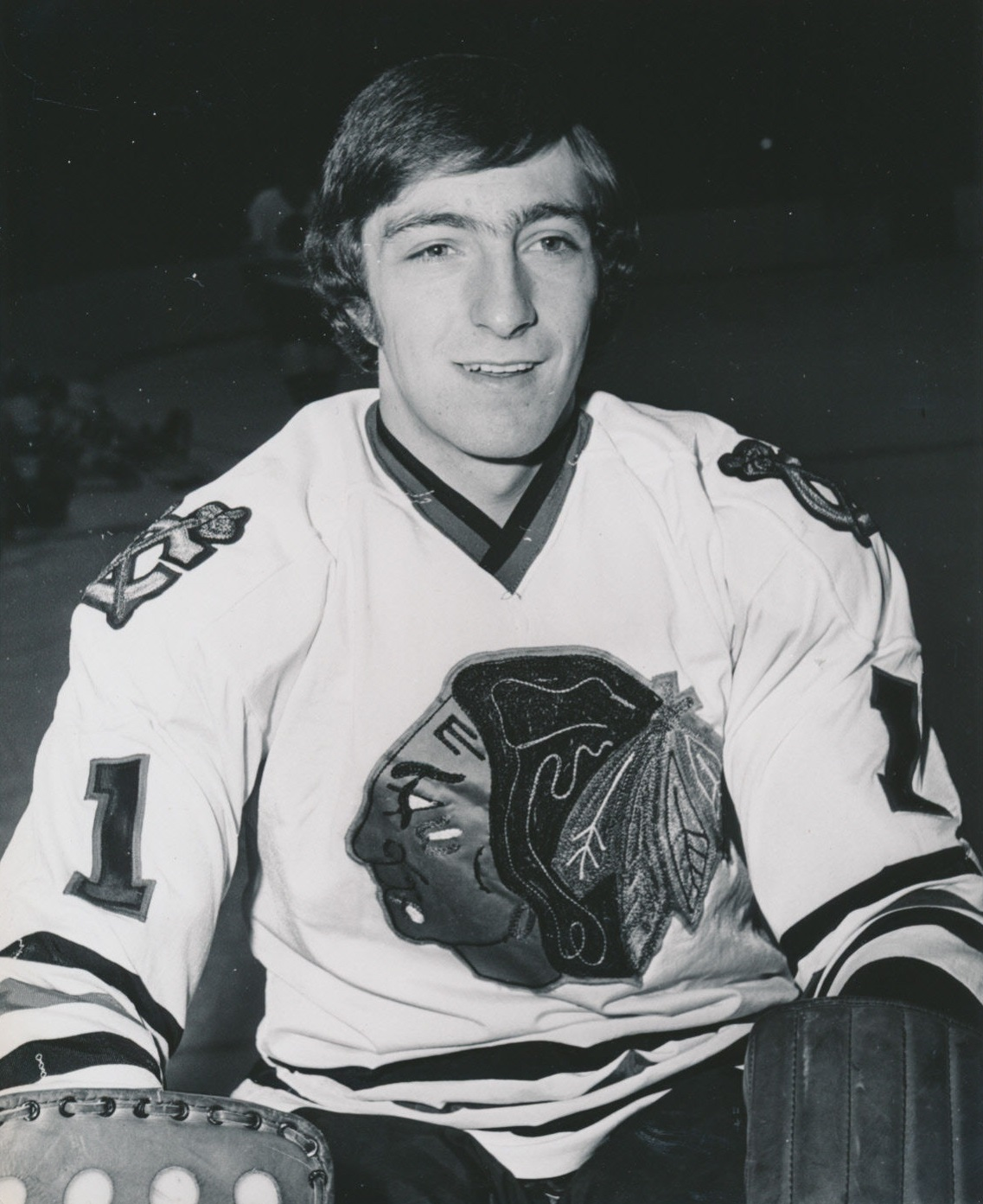
- Veisor with the Chicago Blackhawks in 1973
- Born: August 25, 1952 (age 74) Toronto, Ontario, Canada
- Height: 5 ft 9 in (175 cm)
- Weight: 160 lb (73 kg; 11 st 6 lb)
- Position: Goaltender
- Caught: Left
- Played for: Chicago Black Hawks; Hartford Whalers; Winnipeg Jets
- National team: Canada
- NHL draft: 45th overall, 1972; Chicago Black Hawks
- Playing career: 1972–1984
Medal record
Representing Canada
Ice hockey
World Championships
Bronze medal – third place	1983 West Germany

Michael David Veisor, Sr. (born August 25, 1952) is a Canadian former ice hockey goaltender. He played 139 games in the National Hockey League between 1973 and 1984. He was described as: "One of the most agile goaltenders around; plays goal like a trapeze artist."

== Biography ==
Veisor was born in Toronto, Ontario, Canada, and is Jewish. As a youth, he played in the 1963 Quebec International Pee-Wee Hockey Tournament with a minor ice hockey team from Toronto. He was drafted in Round 3 (#45 overall) in the 1972 NHL Amateur Draft. He started his National Hockey League career with the Chicago Black Hawks in 1973. He was the second Jewish goalie in NHL history. He had wanted to be the first, but he was preceded by Ross Brooks.

He also played for the Hartford Whalers and Winnipeg Jets. He retired after the 1984 season.

Veisor formally worked at Avon Old Farms School, in Avon, Connecticut, as the rink manager. His son, Michael David Veisor, Jr., was drafted by the St. Louis Blues in the 1991 NHL entry draft (12th round, 263rd overall). Mike, Jr. is a former college and minor-league goaltender, but he never played in the NHL.

== Career statistics ==
=== Regular season and playoffs ===
			Regular season									Playoffs
Season	Team	League	GP	W	L	T	MIN	GA	SO	GAA	SV%	GP	W	L	T	MIN	GA	SO	GAA	SV%
1969–70	Hamilton Red Wings	OHA	43	—	—	—	2580	172	0	4.00	—	—	—	—	—	—	—	—	—	—
1970–71	Hamilton Red Wings	OHA	53	—	—	—	3177	266	0	5.02	—	7	2	4	1	409	30	0	4.41	—
1971–72	Peterborough Petes	OHA	49	—	—	—	2920	203	1	4.17	—	15	11	2	2	900	32	2	2.13	—
1971–72	Peterborough Petes	M-Cup	—	—	—	—	—	—	—	—	—	3	2	1	0	180	8	0	2.66	—
1972–73	Dallas Black Hawks	CHL	39	—	—	—	2160	99	4	2.75	—	4	—	—	—	219	14	0	3.83	—
1973–74	Chicago Black Hawks	NHL	10	7	0	2	537	20	1	2.23	.925	2	0	1	—	80	5	0	3.75	.889
1974–75	Chicago Black Hawks	NHL	9	1	5	1	459	36	0	4.71	.838	—	—	—	—	—	—	—	—	—
1974–75	Dallas Black Hawks	CHL	16	11	5	0	958	52	0	3.26	—	10	6	4	—	656	28	2	2.56	—
1975–76	Dallas Black Hawks	CHL	62	28	22	9	3561	174	5	2.93	—	9	5	4	—	540	22	1	2.44	—
1976–77	Chicago Black Hawks	NHL	3	1	2	0	180	13	0	4.33	.887	—	—	—	—	—	—	—	—	—
1976–77	Dallas Black Hawks	CHL	40	17	15	6	2279	116	2	3.05	.897	2	0	2	—	119	6	0	3.03	—
1977–78	Chicago Black Hawks	NHL	12	3	4	5	719	31	2	2.59	.920	—	—	—	—	—	—	—	—	—
1978–79	Chicago Black Hawks	NHL	17	5	8	4	1016	60	0	3.54	.904	—	—	—	—	—	—	—	—	—
1979–80	Chicago Black Hawks	NHL	11	3	5	3	658	36	0	3.28	.903	1	0	1	—	59	6	0	6.08	.760
1980–81	Hartford Whalers	NHL	29	6	13	6	1579	118	1	4.48	.869	—	—	—	—	—	—	—	—	—
1981–82	Hartford Whalers	NHL	13	5	5	2	700	53	0	4.54	.880	—	—	—	—	—	—	—	—	—
1981–82	Binghamton Whalers	AHL	22	13	8	1	1299	67	1	3.09	.880	—	—	—	—	—	—	—	—	—
1982–83	Hartford Whalers	NHL	23	5	16	1	1274	118	1	5.56	.855	—	—	—	—	—	—	—	—	—
1983–84	Hartford Whalers	NHL	4	1	3	0	240	20	0	5.00	.825	—	—	—	—	—	—	—	—	—
1983–84	Winnipeg Jets	NHL	8	4	1	2	419	26	0	3.72	.849	1	0	0	—	40	4	0	6.00	.862
1983–84	Sherbrooke Jets	AHL	5	1	4	0	259	24	0	5.56	.843	—	—	—	—	—	—	—	—	—
NHL totals			139	41	62	26	7781	531	5	4.09	.880	4	0	2	—	179	15	0	5.02	.848

== Awards and honors ==
Award	Year
CHL Rookie of the Year	1972–73

== See also ==
- List of select Jewish ice hockey players
