= 1980–81 NHL transactions =

The following is a list of all team-to-team transactions that occurred in the National Hockey League during the 1980–81 NHL season. It lists what team each player was traded to, signed by, or claimed by, and for which player(s) or draft pick(s), if applicable.

== Trades between teams ==
=== May ===
May 26, 1980	To Quebec Nordiques cash	To Winnipeg Jets Barry Legge

=== June ===
June 2, 1980	To Boston Bruins Jim Craig	To Calgary Flames 2nd-rd pick - 1980 entry draft (# 39 - Steve Konroyd); 3rd-rd pick - 1981 entry draft (# 56 - Mike Vernon)
June 5, 1980	To Hartford Whalers Rick Meagher; 3rd-rd pick - 1981 entry draft (# 61 - Paul MacDermid); 5th-rd pick - 1981 entry draft (# 103 - Dan Bourbonnais)	To Montreal Canadiens 3rd-rd pick - 1981 entry draft (# 46 - Dieter Hegen); 5th-rd pick - 1981 entry draft (# 88 - Steve Rooney)
June 6, 1980	To Minnesota North Stars Alex Pirus	To Detroit Red Wings cash
June 6, 1980	To Los Angeles Kings Garry Unger	To Calgary Flames Randy Holt; Bert Wilson
June 10, 1980	To Toronto Maple Leafs Dave Shand; 3rd-rd pick - 1980 entry draft (WSH - # 55 - Torrie Robertson)^{1}	To Calgary Flames 2nd-rd pick - 1980 NHL entry draft (# 32 - Kevin LaVallee)
June 11, 1980	To Toronto Maple Leafs Tim Coulis; Robert Picard; 2nd-rd pick - 1980 entry draft (# 26 - Bob McGill)	To Washington Capitals Mike Palmateer; 3rd-rd pick - 1980 entry draft (# 55 - Torrie Robertson)
June 11, 1980	To Edmonton Oilers Barry Dean	To Philadelphia Flyers Ron Areshenkoff; 10th-rd pick - 1980 entry draft (# 195 - Bob O'Brien)
June 19, 1980	To Hartford Whalers Mike Veisor	To Chicago Black Hawks 2nd-rd pick - 1981 entry draft (# 25 - Kevin Griffin)
June 19, 1980	To St. Louis Blues Craig Norwich	To Winnipeg Jets Rick Bowness

1. Toronto's third-round pick went to Washington as the result of a trade on June 11, 1980 that sent Tim Coulis, Robert Picard and a second-round pick in the 1980 Entry Draft (26th overall) to Toronto in exchange for Mike Palmateer and this pick.

=== July ===
July 1, 1980	To Calgary Flames cash	To Washington Capitals Jean Pronovost
July 4, 1980	To Minnesota North Stars future considerations	To New York Islanders Alex Pirus
July 15, 1980	To Boston Bruins Rogatien Vachon	To Detroit Red Wings Gilles Gilbert

=== August ===
August 6, 1980	To Winnipeg Jets cash	To New York Rangers Gord Smith
August 11, 1980	To Quebec Nordiques John Paddock	To Philadelphia Flyers cash
August 21, 1980	To Washington Capitals Bob Kelly	To Philadelphia Flyers 3rd-rd pick - 1982 entry draft (# 47 - Bill Campbell)

=== September ===
September 1, 1980	To Montreal Canadiens Dave Gorman	To Calgary Flames Tim Burke
September 4, 1980	To Hartford Whalers cash	To Colorado Rockies Al Smith
September 15, 1980	To Quebec Nordiques Andre Dupont	To Philadelphia Flyers 7th-rd pick - 1981 entry draft (# 137 - Vladimir Svitek) cash
September 26, 1980	To Montreal Canadiens Canadiens option to swap 3rd-rd pick - 1983 entry draft^{1} (WIN - # 33 - Peter Taglianetti)^{2}	To Pittsburgh Penguins Gilles Lupien
September 26, 1980	To Montreal Canadiens 2nd-rd pick - 1982 entry draft (# 33 - David Maley)	To Winnipeg Jets Norm Dupont

1. Montreal exercised the option and swap the 58th pick for the 43rd overall pick in 1983.
2. Montreal's third-round pick went to Winnipeg with $50,000 cash as compensation to allow Montreal to hire Serge Savard as the new general manager on April 28, 1983.

=== October ===
October 6, 1980	To Vancouver Canucks Richard Brodeur; 5th-rd pick - 1981 entry draft (# 105 - Moe Lemay)	To New York Islanders 5th-rd pick - 1981 entry draft (# 94 - Jacques Sylvestre)
October 8, 1980	To Quebec Nordiques cash	To Winnipeg Jets Danny Geoffrion
October 9, 1980	To Calgary Flames Alex McKendry	To New York Islanders 3rd-rd pick - 1981 entry draft (# 57 - Ron Handy)
October 30, 1980	To Buffalo Sabres Bob Hess; 4th-rd pick - 1981 entry draft (# 83 - Anders Wikberg)	To St. Louis Blues Bill Stewart
October 31, 1980	To Detroit Red Wings cash	To Winnipeg Jets Barry Long

=== November ===
November 11, 1980	To Vancouver Canucks Mario Marois; Jim Mayer	To New York Rangers Jeff Bandura; Jere Gillis
November 18, 1980	To Calgary Flames Frank Beaton	To New York Rangers Dale Lewis
November 18, 1980	To Toronto Maple Leafs Kim Davies; Paul Marshall	To Pittsburgh Penguins Dave Burrows; Paul Gardner
November 21, 1980	To Hartford Whalers Norm Barnes; Jack McIlhargey	To Philadelphia Flyers 2nd-rd pick in 1982 entry draft (TOR - # 25 - Peter Ihnacak)^{1}

1. Philadelphia's second-round pick went to Toronto as the result of a trade on January 20, 1982 that sent Darryl Sittler to Philadelphia in exchange for Rich Costello, future considerations (Ken Strong) and this pick.

=== December ===
December 1, 1980	To Chicago Black Hawks Peter Marsh	To Winnipeg Jets Doug Lecuyer; Tim Trimper
December 2, 1980	To Toronto Maple Leafs cash	To Winnipeg Jets Richard Mulhern
December 4, 1980	To Toronto Maple Leafs Jim Rutherford	To Detroit Red Wings Mark Kirton
December 8, 1980	To Colorado Rockies cash	To Vancouver Canucks Mike Christie
December 12, 1980	To Los Angeles Kings cash	To Quebec Nordiques Ron Grahame
December 16, 1980	To Hartford Whalers Mike Fidler	To Minnesota North Stars Gordie Roberts
December 18, 1980	To Boston Bruins Mike O'Connell	To Chicago Black Hawks Al Secord
December 26, 1980	To Washington Capitals Dwayne Lowdermilk	To New York Islanders future considerations
December 29, 1980	To Minnesota North Stars Ken Solheim; 2nd-rd pick - 1981 entry draft (# 33 - Tom Hirsch)	To Chicago Black Hawks Glen Sharpley

=== January ===
January 2, 1981	To Washington Capitals 5th-rd pick - 1981 entry draft (# 91 - Peter Sidorkiewicz)	To Pittsburgh Penguins Gary Rissling
January 8, 1981	To Detroit Red Wings Gary McAdam	To Pittsburgh Penguins Errol Thompson
January 15, 1981	To Hartford Whalers 5th-rd pick - 1981 entry draft (# 83 - Bill Maguire)	To New York Rangers Nick Fotiu
January 30, 1981	To Toronto Maple Leafs Rene Robert	To Colorado Rockies 3rd-rd pick - 1981 entry draft (# 48 - Uli Hiemer)
January 30, 1981	To Quebec Nordiques Dan Bouchard	To Calgary Flames Jamie Hislop

=== February ===
February, 1981 exact date unknown	To Hartford Whalers John Stewart	To Calgary Flames future considerations
February 2, 1981	To Minnesota North Stars future considerations^{1} (3rd-rd pick - 1982 entry draft - # 59 - Wally Chapman)	To Edmonton Oilers Gary Edwards
February 3, 1981	To Calgary Flames Dan Labraaten	To Detroit Red Wings Earl Ingarfield Jr.
February 10, 1981	To Quebec Nordiques cash	To Winnipeg Jets Michel Dion
February 17, 1981	To Montreal Canadiens 2nd-rd pick - 1983 entry draft (# 26 - Claude Lemieux)	To Los Angeles Kings Rick Chartraw
February 18, 1981	To Boston Bruins Mike Gillis	To Colorado Rockies Bob Miller
February 18, 1981	To Toronto Maple Leafs Ron Sedlbauer	To Chicago Black Hawks cash
February 20, 1981	To Hartford Whalers Gilles Lupien	To Pittsburgh Penguins 6th-rd pick - 1981 entry draft (# 109 - Paul Edwards)
February 24, 1981	To Calgary Flames future considerations^{2} (Rick Vasko)	To Detroit Red Wings Brad Smith
February 26, 1981	To Colorado Rockies Phil Myre	To Philadelphia Flyers cash

1. Trade completed on June 9, 1982, at the 1982 NHL entry draft.
2. Trade completed on May 28, 1981.

=== March ===
- Trading Deadline: March 10, 1981

March 8, 1981	To Los Angeles Kings 5th-rd pick - 1982 entry draft (# 95 - Ulf Isaksson) future considerations^{1} (Gary Bromley)	To Vancouver Canucks Doug Halward
March 10, 1981	To Buffalo Sabres 6th-rd pick - 1982 entry draft (# 111 - Jeff Parker) cash	To Los Angeles Kings Don Luce
March 10, 1981	To Buffalo Sabres 3rd-rd pick - 1981 entry draft (# 60 - Colin Chisholm); 1st-rd pick in 1983 entry draft (# 5 - Tom Barrasso)	To Los Angeles Kings Rick Martin
March 10, 1981	To Montreal Canadiens 3rd-rd pick - 1983 entry draft (# 45 - Daniel Letendre); Canadiens option to swap 4th-rd pick - 1984 entry draft (# 65 - Lee Brodeur)^{2}	To Colorado Rockies Bill Baker
March 10, 1981	To Colorado Rockies Chico Resch; Steve Tambellini	To New York Islanders Jari Kaarela; Mike McEwen
March 10, 1981	To Edmonton Oilers Ray Markham	To New York Rangers John Hughes
March 10, 1981	To Edmonton Oilers Pat Hughes	To Pittsburgh Penguins Pat Price
March 10, 1981	To Quebec Nordiques Mario Marois	To Vancouver Canucks Garry Lariviere
March 10, 1981	To Vancouver Canucks Blair MacDonald rights to Lars-Gunnar Pettersson	To Edmonton Oilers Ken Berry; Garry Lariviere
March 10, 1981	To Los Angeles Kings 7th-rd pick - 1981 entry draft (# 134 - Craig Hurley)	To Edmonton Oilers Garry Unger
March 10, 1981	To Toronto Maple Leafs Ron Zanussi; 3rd-rd pick - 1981 entry draft (# 55 - Ernie Godden)	To Minnesota North Stars 2nd-rd pick - 1981 entry draft (# 27 - Dave Donnelly)
March 10, 1981	To Toronto Maple Leafs Michel Larocque	To Montreal Canadiens Robert Picard
March 10, 1981	To Toronto Maple Leafs 5th-rd pick - 1981 entry draft (# 102 - Barry Brigley)	To Los Angeles Kings Jim Rutherford

1. Trade completed on May 12, 1981.
2. Montreal exercised the option and swap the 74th pick for the 65th overall pick in 1984.

== Additional sources ==
- hockeydb.com - search for player and select "show trades"
- "NHL trades for 1980-1981". NHL Trade Tracker.
