= 1980–81 Toronto Maple Leafs season =

NHL hockey team season

1980–81 Toronto Maple Leafs
- Division: 5th Adams
- Conference: 8th Wales
- 1980–81 record: 28–37–15
- Home record: 14–21–5
- Road record: 14–16–10
- Goals for: 322
- Goals against: 367

Team information
- General manager: Gerry McNamara
- Coach: Joe Crozier
- Captain: Darryl Sittler
- Alternate captains: None
- Arena: Maple Leaf Gardens

Team leaders
- Goals: Darryl Sittler (43)
- Assists: Borje Salming (61)
- Points: Wilf Paiement (97)
- Penalty minutes: Rick Vaive (229)
- Wins: Jiri Crha (20)
- Goals against average: Jiri Crha (4.08)

The 1980–81 Toronto Maple Leafs season was the Toronto Maple Leafs 64th season of the franchise, 54th season as the Maple Leafs. The team would make the playoffs for the eighth consecutive year.

== Offseason ==
=== NHL draft ===
Round	Pick	Player	Nationality	College/Junior/Club team
2	25	Craig Muni	Canada	Kingston Canadians (OHA)
2	26	Bob McGill	Canada	Victoria Cougars (WHL)
3	43	Fred Boimistruck	Canada	Cornwall Royals (QMJHL)
4	74	Stewart Gavin	Canada	Toronto Marlboros (OMJHL)
5	95	Hugh Larkin	United States	Sault Ste. Marie Greyhounds (OMJHL)
6	116	Ron Dennis	Canada	Princeton University (ECAC)
7	137	Russ Adam	Canada	Kitchener Rangers (OMJHL)
8	158	Fred Perlini	Canada	Toronto Marlboros (OMJHL)
9	179	Darwin McCutcheon	Canada	Toronto Marlboros (OMJHL)
10	200	Paul Rothbart	United States	University of Wisconsin NCAA

== Regular season ==
=== Final standings ===
Adams Division
	GP	W	L	T	GF	GA	Pts
**Buffalo Sabres**	80	39	20	21	327	250	99
**Boston Bruins**	80	37	30	13	316	272	87
**Minnesota North Stars**	80	35	28	17	291	263	87
**Quebec Nordiques**	80	30	32	18	314	318	78
**Toronto Maple Leafs**	80	28	37	15	322	367	71

Note: GP = Games played, W = Wins, L = Losses, T = Ties, Pts = Points, GF = Goals for, GA = Goals against
Note: Teams that qualified for the playoffs are highlighted in bold.

League standings
R		Div	GP	W	L	T	GF	GA	Pts
1	**p – New York Islanders**	PTK	80	48	18	14	355	260	110
2	**x – St. Louis Blues**	SMY	80	45	18	17	352	281	107
3	**y – Montreal Canadiens**	NRS	80	45	22	13	332	232	103
4	**Los Angeles Kings**	NRS	80	43	24	13	337	290	99
5	**x – Buffalo Sabres**	ADM	80	39	20	21	327	250	99
6	**Philadelphia Flyers**	PTK	80	41	24	15	313	249	97
7	**Calgary Flames**	PTK	80	39	27	14	329	298	92
8	**Boston Bruins**	ADM	80	37	30	13	316	272	87
9	**Minnesota North Stars**	ADM	80	35	28	17	291	263	87
10	**Chicago Black Hawks**	SMY	80	31	33	16	304	315	78
11	**Quebec Nordiques**	ADM	80	30	32	18	314	318	78
12	**Vancouver Canucks**	SMY	80	28	32	20	289	301	76
13	**New York Rangers**	PTK	80	30	36	14	312	317	74
14	**Edmonton Oilers**	SMY	80	29	35	16	328	327	74
15	**Pittsburgh Penguins**	NRS	80	30	37	13	302	345	73
16	**Toronto Maple Leafs**	ADM	80	28	37	15	322	367	71
17	Washington Capitals	PTK	80	26	36	18	286	317	70
18	Hartford Whalers	NRS	80	21	41	18	292	372	60
19	Colorado Rockies	SMY	80	22	45	13	258	344	57
20	Detroit Red Wings	NRS	80	19	43	18	252	339	56
21	Winnipeg Jets	SMY	80	9	57	14	246	400	32

Divisions: ADM – Adams, NRS – Norris, PTK – Patrick, SMY – Smythe

bold – The top 16 teams in the league qualified for the playoffs, regardless of division or conference.
x – Won division; y – Won Conference (and division); p – Won Presidents' Trophy (and conference and division)

=== Record vs. opponents ===
Adams Division record vs. opponents

==== Vs. Wales Conference ====
**Vs. Adams Division**

1980–81 NHL records
Team	**BOS**	**BUF**	**MIN**	**QUE**	**TOR**	**Total**
Boston	—	2–1–1	2–1–1	1–3	1–1–2	**6–6–4**
Buffalo	1–2–1	—	0–1–3	3–0–1	3–1	**7–4–5**
Minnesota	1–2–1	1–0–3	—	2–2	0–4	**4–8–4**
Quebec	3–1	0–3–1	2–2	—	0–2–2	**5–8–3**
Toronto	1–1–2	1–3	4–0	2–0–2	—	**8–4–4**

**Vs. Norris Division**

1980–81 NHL records
Team	**DET**	**HFD**	**LAK**	**MTL**	**PIT**	**Total**
Boston	2−0−2	1−1−2	2−2	1−3	3−0−1	**9–6–5**
Buffalo	3−0−1	2−1−1	2−1−1	1−3	3−0−1	**11–5–4**
Minnesota	2−0−2	3−1	0−4	2−1−1	3−1	**10–7–3**
Quebec	3−0−1	2−2	1−3	1−1−2	1−2–1	**8–8–4**
Toronto	1−3	1–1−2	0−3−1	1−3	2−1–1	**5–11–4**

==== Vs. Campbell Conference ====
**Vs. Patrick Division**

1980–81 NHL records
Team	**CGY**	**NYI**	**NYR**	**PHI**	**WSH**	**Total**
Boston	1–3	2–2	2–2	2–2	2–1–1	**9–10–1**
Buffalo	2–1–1	2–2	2–1–1	2–0–2	2–0–2	**10–4–6**
Minnesota	2–2	0–2–2	1–1–2	1–2–1	3–0–1	**7–7–6**
Quebec	1–1–2	1–3	1–1–2	2–1–1	4–0	**9–6–5**
Toronto	2–2	1–3	2–2	2–0–2	1–3	**8–10–2**

**Vs. Smythe Division**

1980–81 NHL records
Team	**CHI**	**COL**	**EDM**	**STL**	**VAN**	**WIN**	**Total**
Boston	3−1	2−1−1	3−1	1−3	2−2	2−0−2	**13−8−3**
Buffalo	2−2	3–0−1	1−1−2	0−3−1	1−1−2	4−0	**11−7−6**
Minnesota	2−2	2−1–1	2−1−1	2−1–1	2−1−1	4−0	**14−6−4**
Quebec	0−3−1	2−2	3−1	1−2–1	1–1−2	1–1−2	**8−10−6**
Toronto	2−1–1	1−1−2	1−2−1	1−3	0–3−1	2−2	**7−12−5**

== Playoffs ==
The Maple Leafs qualified for the playoffs as one of the top sixteen teams. In the preliminary round, the Maple Leafs faced the New York Islanders, the defending and eventual Stanley Cup champions. The Maple Leafs were swept in three games, to date the last time the franchise was swept in a postseason series.

== Schedule and results ==
1980–81 regular season
October

Game	Result	Date	Score	Opponent	Record
1	L	October 11, 1980	3–8	New York Rangers (1980–81)	0–1–0
2	W	October 12, 1980	4–2	@ Philadelphia Flyers (1980–81)	1–1–0
3	W	October 15, 1980	6–4	Detroit Red Wings (1980–81)	2–1–0
4	W	October 18, 1980	6–2	Philadelphia Flyers (1980–81)	3–1–0
5	W	October 19, 1980	4–2	@ Buffalo Sabres (1980–81)	4–1–0
6	W	October 21, 1980	8–5	Pittsburgh Penguins (1980–81)	5–1–0
7	W	October 23, 1980	5–4	@ Calgary Flames (1980–81)	6–1–0
8	L	October 25, 1980	4–5	@ Los Angeles Kings (1980–81)	6–2–0
9	L	October 26, 1980	5–8	@ Vancouver Canucks (1980–81)	6–3–0
10	T	October 29, 1980	4–4	@ Edmonton Oilers (1980–81)	6–3–1

November

Game	Result	Date	Score	Opponent	Record
11	L	November 1, 1980	4–5	Colorado Rockies (1980–81)	6–4–1
12	W	November 5, 1980	2–1	@ Pittsburgh Penguins (1980–81)	7–4–1
13	T	November 8, 1980	3–3	@ Colorado Rockies (1980–81)	7–4–2
14	W	November 9, 1980	7–4	@ Winnipeg Jets (1980–81)	8–4–2
15	L	November 12, 1980	2–4	New York Islanders (1980–81)	8–5–2
16	W	November 15, 1980	4–2	Edmonton Oilers (1980–81)	9–5–2
17	L	November 19, 1980	4–5	Montreal Canadiens (1980–81)	9–6–2
18	L	November 22, 1980	2–5	Los Angeles Kings (1980–81)	9–7–2
19	T	November 23, 1980	5–5	@ Boston Bruins (1980–81)	9–7–3
20	L	November 26, 1980	4–6	St. Louis Blues (1980–81)	9–8–3
21	L	November 28, 1980	2–6	@ Washington Capitals (1980–81)	9–9–3
22	L	November 29, 1980	3–7	Washington Capitals (1980–81)	9–10–3

December

Game	Result	Date	Score	Opponent	Record
23	T	December 3, 1980	4–4	Pittsburgh Penguins (1980–81)	9–10–4
24	W	December 6, 1980	5–2	Quebec Nordiques (1980–81)	10–10–4
25	T	December 7, 1980	4–4	@ Quebec Nordiques (1980–81)	10–10–5
26	L	December 10, 1980	5–8	Vancouver Canucks (1980–81)	10–11–5
27	L	December 11, 1980	2–5	@ Montreal Canadiens (1980–81)	10–12–5
28	L	December 13, 1980	4–5	Buffalo Sabres (1980–81)	10–13–5
29	W	December 15, 1980	6–3	@ Minnesota North Stars (1980–81)	11–13–5
30	W	December 17, 1980	4–2	Minnesota North Stars (1980–81)	12–13–5
31	L	December 18, 1980	3–5	@ Detroit Red Wings (1980–81)	12–14–5
32	L	December 20, 1980	2–5	Chicago Black Hawks (1980–81)	12–15–5
33	L	December 23, 1980	2–7	Hartford Whalers (1980–81)	12–16–5
34	L	December 27, 1980	3–6	Boston Bruins (1980–81)	12–17–5
35	W	December 28, 1980	6–3	@ Chicago Black Hawks (1980–81)	13–17–5
36	L	December 30, 1980	3–5	@ St. Louis Blues (1980–81)	13–18–5

January

Game	Result	Date	Score	Opponent	Record
37	L	January 3, 1981	1–4	@ Edmonton Oilers (1980–81)	13–19–5
38	L	January 4, 1981	5–8	@ Calgary Flames (1980–81)	13–20–5
39	L	January 6, 1981	3–6	@ New York Islanders (1980–81)	13–21–5
40	L	January 7, 1981	2–8	Winnipeg Jets (1980–81)	13–22–5
41	T	January 10, 1981	4–4	Philadelphia Flyers (1980–81)	13–22–6
42	W	January 11, 1981	5–3	@ New York Rangers (1980–81)	14–22–6
43	L	January 14, 1981	4–7	Edmonton Oilers (1980–81)	14–23–6
44	W	January 17, 1981	6–5	Montreal Canadiens (1980–81)	15–23–6
45	W	January 18, 1981	5–4	@ Winnipeg Jets (1980–81)	16–23–6
46	T	January 20, 1981	2–2	@ Vancouver Canucks (1980–81)	16–23–7
47	T	January 22, 1981	3–3	@ Los Angeles Kings (1980–81)	16–23–8
48	W	January 24, 1981	7–4	Hartford Whalers (1980–81)	17–23–8
49	L	January 26, 1981	2–4	Detroit Red Wings (1980–81)	17–24–8
50	L	January 28, 1981	4–6	New York Islanders (1980–81)	17–25–8
51	T	January 30, 1981	5–5	@ Hartford Whalers (1980–81)	17–25–9
52	L	January 31, 1981	0–2	Winnipeg Jets (1980–81)	17–26–9

February

Game	Result	Date	Score	Opponent	Record
53	L	February 3, 1981	3–5	@ Detroit Red Wings (1980–81)	17–27–9
54	L	February 5, 1981	4–8	@ St. Louis Blues (1980–81)	17–28–9
55	T	February 8, 1981	6–6	@ Colorado Rockies (1980–81)	17–28–10
56	W	February 12, 1981	4–3	@ Minnesota North Stars (1980–81)	18–28–10
57	W	February 14, 1981	6–3	New York Rangers (1980–81)	19–28–10
58	W	February 17, 1981	8–5	@ New York Islanders (1980–81)	20–28–10
59	L	February 18, 1981	3–8	@ New York Rangers (1980–81)	20–29–10
60	W	February 21, 1981	5–3	Minnesota North Stars (1980–81)	21–29–10
61	W	February 22, 1981	7–4	@ Chicago Black Hawks (1980–81)	22–29–10
62	W	February 25, 1981	9–5	Colorado Rockies (1980–81)	23–29–10
63	L	February 28, 1981	3–5	@ Montreal Canadiens (1980–81)	23–30–10

March

Game	Result	Date	Score	Opponent	Record
64	L	March 2, 1981	0–1	Los Angeles Kings (1980–81)	23–31–10
65	L	March 4, 1981	2–5	Vancouver Canucks (1980–81)	23–32–10
66	L	March 7, 1981	4–6	Calgary Flames (1980–81)	23–33–10
67	L	March 8, 1981	3–7	@ Washington Capitals (1980–81)	23–34–10
68	T	March 11, 1981	4–4	Boston Bruins (1980–81)	23–34–11
69	W	March 14, 1981	5–3	Washington Capitals (1980–81)	24–34–11
70	T	March 15, 1981	4–4	@ Philadelphia Flyers (1980–81)	24–34–12
71	W	March 18, 1981	6–2	St. Louis Blues (1980–81)	25–34–12
72	L	March 19, 1981	4–14	@ Buffalo Sabres (1980–81)	25–35–12
73	L	March 21, 1981	2–6	Buffalo Sabres (1980–81)	25–36–12
74	T	March 22, 1981	3–3	@ Hartford Whalers (1980–81)	25–36–13
75	L	March 25, 1981	2–5	@ Pittsburgh Penguins (1980–81)	25–37–13
76	W	March 26, 1981	3–2	@ Boston Bruins (1980–81)	26–37–13
77	W	March 28, 1981	9–5	Calgary Flames (1980–81)	27–37–13

April

Game	Result	Date	Score	Opponent	Record
78	T	April 1, 1981	2–2	Chicago Black Hawks (1980–81)	27–37–14
79	T	April 4, 1981	5–5	Quebec Nordiques (1980–81)	27–37–15
80	W	April 5, 1981	4–2	@ Quebec Nordiques (1980–81)	28–37–15

Legend: Win (2 points) Loss (0 points) Tie (1 point)

== Player statistics ==
=== Regular season ===
Scoring

Player	Pos	GP	G	A	Pts	PIM	+/-	PPG	SHG	GWG
Wilf Paiement	RW	77	40	57	97	145	-7	13	3	2
Darryl Sittler	C	80	43	53	96	77	-8	14	2	2
Bill Derlago	C	80	35	39	74	26	-11	6	0	3
Ian Turnbull	D	80	19	47	66	104	-17	8	0	1
Borje Salming	D	72	5	61	66	154	0	1	1	1
Rick Vaive	RW	75	33	29	62	229	-16	8	2	1
Pat Hickey	LW	72	16	33	49	49	-16	5	0	1
John Anderson	RW	75	17	26	43	31	-11	2	0	1
Dan Maloney	LW	65	20	21	41	183	-10	13	0	2
Terry Martin	LW	69	23	14	37	32	15	1	0	4
Laurie Boschman	C	53	14	19	33	178	-10	3	0	4
Rocky Saganiuk	RW/C	71	12	18	30	52	-16	2	0	3
Robert Picard	D	59	6	19	25	68	-32	2	0	0
Bruce Boudreau	C	39	10	14	24	18	-7	0	0	0
Dave Farrish	D	74	2	18	20	90	-7	1	0	0
Ron Sedlbauer	LW	21	10	4	14	14	-3	5	0	2
Rene Robert	RW	14	6	7	13	8	5	1	0	1
Vitezslav Duris	D	57	1	12	13	50	13	0	0	0
Barry Melrose	D	57	2	5	7	166	-18	0	1	0
Ron Ellis	RW	27	2	3	5	2	-1	0	0	0
Dave Shand	D	47	0	4	4	60	-14	0	0	0
Ron Zanussi	RW	12	3	0	3	6	-7	0	0	0
Stew Gavin	LW	14	1	2	3	13	0	0	0	0
Greg Hotham	D	11	1	1	2	11	4	0	0	0
Mike Kaszycki	C	6	0	2	2	2	2	0	0	0
Paul Marshall	LW	13	0	2	2	2	-2	0	0	0
Bill McCreary	RW	12	1	0	1	4	-6	0	0	0
Jiri Crha	G	54	0	1	1	8	0	0	0	0
Dave Burrows	D	6	0	0	0	2	-4	0	0	0
Kim Davis	C	2	0	0	0	4	0	0	0	0
Mark Kirton	C	11	0	0	0	0	-1	0	0	0
Michel Larocque	G	8	0	0	0	0	0	0	0	0
Curt Ridley	G	3	0	0	0	2	0	0	0	0
Jim Rutherford	G	18	0	0	0	2	0	0	0	0
Vincent Tremblay	G	3	0	0	0	0	0	0	0	0

Goaltending

Player	MIN	GP	W	L	T	GA	GAA	SO
Jiri Crha	3112	54	20	20	11	211	4.07	0
Jim Rutherford	961	18	4	10	2	82	5.12	0
Michel Larocque	460	8	3	3	2	40	5.22	0
Curt Ridley	124	3	1	1	0	12	5.81	0
Vincent Tremblay	143	3	0	3	0	16	6.71	0
Team:	4800	80	28	37	15	361	4.51	0

=== Playoffs ===
Scoring

Player	Pos	GP	G	A	Pts	PIM	PPG	SHG	GWG
Rene Robert	RW	3	0	2	2	2	0	0	0
Borje Salming	D	3	0	2	2	4	0	0	0
Bruce Boudreau	C	2	1	0	1	0	0	0	0
Bill Derlago	C	3	1	0	1	2	1	0	0
Ian Turnbull	D	3	1	0	1	4	0	0	0
Rick Vaive	RW	3	1	0	1	4	0	0	0
Vitezslav Duris	D	3	0	1	1	2	0	0	0
Barry Melrose	D	3	0	1	1	15	0	0	0
Ron Sedlbauer	LW	2	0	1	1	2	0	0	0
John Anderson	RW	2	0	0	0	0	0	0	0
Laurie Boschman	C	3	0	0	0	7	0	0	0
Jiri Crha	G	3	0	0	0	0	0	0	0
Dave Farrish	D	1	0	0	0	0	0	0	0
Paul Harrison	G	1	0	0	0	0	0	0	0
Pat Hickey	LW	2	0	0	0	0	0	0	0
Michel Larocque	G	2	0	0	0	0	0	0	0
Dan Maloney	LW	3	0	0	0	4	0	0	0
Terry Martin	LW	3	0	0	0	0	0	0	0
Wilf Paiement	RW	3	0	0	0	2	0	0	0
Dave Shand	D	3	0	0	0	0	0	0	0
Darryl Sittler	C	3	0	0	0	4	0	0	0
Ron Zanussi	RW	3	0	0	0	0	0	0	0

Goaltending

Player	MIN	GP	W	L	GA	GAA	SO
Jiri Crha	65	3	0	2	11	10.15	0
Paul Harrison	40	1	0	0	1	1.50	0
Michel Larocque	75	2	0	1	8	6.40	0
Team:	180	3	0	3	20	6.67	0

Note:

Pos = Position;GP = Games played; G = Goals; A = Assists; Pts = Points; PIM = Penalty minutes; +/- = Plus/minus; PPG = Power-play goals; SHG = Short-handed goals; GWG = Game-winning goals
Pos = Position;GP = Games played; Min, TOI = Minutes played; W = Wins; L = Losses; T,T/OT = Ties; OTL = Overtime losses; GA = Goals-against; GAA = Goals-against average; SO = Shutouts; SA = Shots against; SV = Shots saved;SV% = Save percentage;

== Transactions ==
The Maple Leafs have been involved in the following transactions during the 1980–81 season.

=== Trades ===
November 18, 1980	To Pittsburgh Penguins Paul Gardner; Dave Burrows	To Toronto Maple Leafs Paul Marshall; Kim Davis
December 2, 1980	To Winnipeg Jets Richard Mulhern	To Toronto Maple Leafs Cash
December 4, 1980	To Detroit Red Wings Mark Kirton	To Toronto Maple Leafs Jim Rutherford
January 30, 1981	To Colorado Rockies 3rd round pick in 1981 – Uli Heimer	To Toronto Maple Leafs Rene Robert
February 18, 1981	To Chicago Black Hawks Cash	To Toronto Maple Leafs Ron Sedlbauer
March 10, 1981	To Los Angeles Kings Jim Rutherford	To Toronto Maple Leafs 5th round pick in 1981 – Barry Brigley
March 10, 1981	To Montreal Canadiens Robert Picard; 8th round pick in 1982 – Steve Smith	To Toronto Maple Leafs Michel Larocque
March 10, 1981	To Minnesota North Stars 2nd round pick in 1981 – Dave Donnelly	To Toronto Maple Leafs Ron Zanussi; 3rd round pick in 1981 – Ernie Godden

=== Waivers ===
November 30, 1980	From Winnipeg Jets Barry Melrose

=== Free agents ===
Player	Former team
Vítězslav Ďuriš	Czechoslovakia
Serge Boisvert	Undrafted free agent
Bill Riley	Winnipeg Jets
