= 1980–81 Calgary Flames season =

NHL team season (first season in Calgary)

1980–81 Calgary Flames
- Division: 3rd Patrick
- Conference: 4th Campbell
- 1980–81 record: 39–27–14
- Home record: 25–5–10
- Road record: 14–22–4
- Goals for: 329
- Goals against: 298

Team information
- General manager: Cliff Fletcher
- Coach: Al MacNeil
- Captain: Brad Marsh
- Alternate captains: None
- Arena: Stampede Corral
- Average attendance: 7,217

Team leaders
- Goals: Kent Nilsson (49)
- Assists: Kent Nilsson (82)
- Points: Kent Nilsson (131)
- Penalty minutes: Willi Plett (239)
- Wins: Pat Riggin (21)
- Goals against average: Rejean Lemelin (3.83)

The 1980–81 Calgary Flames season was the first season in Calgary and ninth for the Flames in the National Hockey League (NHL). The Flames moved to southern Alberta from Atlanta, where the franchise was known as the Atlanta Flames for the first eight years of its existence. The Flames became the third major-league team to represent the city of Calgary after the Calgary Tigers of the 1920s, and the Calgary Cowboys, which had folded in 1977.

The Flames were purchased for $16 million USD by Nelson Skalbania in the spring of 1980. Before the sale was even announced, he had already sold 50% of the franchise to a group of Calgary-based investors including Harley Hotchkiss and Normie Kwong. In May 1980, it was announced that the franchise was moving to Calgary. While the Cowboys could not manage 2,000 season tickets three years previous, the Flames sold 10,000 full and half-season ticket packages in 1980, selling out the Stampede Corral for every game played there.

Despite the move west, the Flames remained in the East-coast-centered Patrick Division. For practical purposes however, the anomaly was academic. At the time, the league played a balanced schedule and used a league-wide playoff format. This arrangement would only last one more season before the league re-aligned to reflect its geography.

Calgary's first NHL game was played October 9, ending as a 5–5 tie to the Quebec Nordiques. The Flames finished third in their division and qualified for the playoffs. The franchise, which had won just two playoff games in Atlanta, won two playoff series in their first year in Calgary. After sweeping the Chicago Black Hawks, Calgary then downed the Philadelphia Flyers in seven games before falling to the Minnesota North Stars in the league semi-final.

Kent Nilsson led the Flames in scoring, and his 82 assists and 131 points remain franchise records to this day. Nilsson was also the Flames lone representative at the 1981 All-Star Game.

== Regular season ==
=== Season standings ===
Patrick Division
	GP	W	L	T	GF	GA	Pts
**New York Islanders**	80	48	18	14	355	260	110
**Philadelphia Flyers**	80	41	24	15	313	249	97
**Calgary Flames**	80	39	27	14	329	298	92
**New York Rangers**	80	30	36	14	312	317	74
Washington Capitals	80	26	36	18	286	317	70

Note: GP = Games played, W = Wins, L = Losses, T = Ties, Pts = Points, GF = Goals for, GA = Goals against
Note: Teams that qualified for the playoffs are highlighted in bold.

League standings
R		Div	GP	W	L	T	GF	GA	Pts
1	**p – New York Islanders**	PTK	80	48	18	14	355	260	110
2	**x – St. Louis Blues**	SMY	80	45	18	17	352	281	107
3	**y – Montreal Canadiens**	NRS	80	45	22	13	332	232	103
4	**Los Angeles Kings**	NRS	80	43	24	13	337	290	99
5	**x – Buffalo Sabres**	ADM	80	39	20	21	327	250	99
6	**Philadelphia Flyers**	PTK	80	41	24	15	313	249	97
7	**Calgary Flames**	PTK	80	39	27	14	329	298	92
8	**Boston Bruins**	ADM	80	37	30	13	316	272	87
9	**Minnesota North Stars**	ADM	80	35	28	17	291	263	87
10	**Chicago Black Hawks**	SMY	80	31	33	16	304	315	78
11	**Quebec Nordiques**	ADM	80	30	32	18	314	318	78
12	**Vancouver Canucks**	SMY	80	28	32	20	289	301	76
13	**New York Rangers**	PTK	80	30	36	14	312	317	74
14	**Edmonton Oilers**	SMY	80	29	35	16	328	327	74
15	**Pittsburgh Penguins**	NRS	80	30	37	13	302	345	73
16	**Toronto Maple Leafs**	ADM	80	28	37	15	322	367	71
17	Washington Capitals	PTK	80	26	36	18	286	317	70
18	Hartford Whalers	NRS	80	21	41	18	292	372	60
19	Colorado Rockies	SMY	80	22	45	13	258	344	57
20	Detroit Red Wings	NRS	80	19	43	18	252	339	56
21	Winnipeg Jets	SMY	80	9	57	14	246	400	32

Divisions: ADM – Adams, NRS – Norris, PTK – Patrick, SMY – Smythe

bold – The top 16 teams in the league qualified for the playoffs, regardless of division or conference.
x – Won division; y – Won Conference (and division); p – Won Presidents' Trophy (and conference and division)

=== Record vs. opponents ===
Patrick Division record vs. opponents

==== Vs. Campbell Conference ====
**Vs. Patrick Division**

1980–81 NHL records
Team	**CGY**	**NYI**	**NYR**	**PHI**	**WSH**	**Total**
Calgary	—	1−1−2	2−1−1	2−2	3−1	**8−5−3**
N.Y. Islanders	1−1−2	—	2−2	1−2−1	4−0	**8−5−3**
N.Y. Rangers	1−2−1	2−2	—	1−1−2	2−2	**6−7−3**
Philadelphia	2−2	2−1−1	1−1−2	—	2−2	**7−6−3**
Washington	1−3	0−4	2−2	2−2	—	**5−11−0**

**Vs. Smythe Division**

1980–81 NHL records
Team	**CHI**	**COL**	**EDM**	**STL**	**VAN**	**WIN**	**Total**
Calgary	0−1−3	1−3	2−1−1	2−2	3−1	3−0−1	**11−8−5**
N.Y. Islanders	4−0	3−1	2−0−2	2−0−2	3−1	3−0−1	**17−2−5**
N.Y. Rangers	2−1−1	1−3	2−1−1	0−4	2−1−1	3−1	**10−11−3**
Philadelphia	1−1−2	4−0	2−2	3−0−1	1−2−1	3−1	**14−6−4**
Washington	1−1−2	3−0−1	2−1−1	0−2−2	1−1−2	3−0−1	**10−5−9**

**Vs. Wales Conference**

**Vs. Adams Division**

1980–81 NHL records
Team	**BOS**	**BUF**	**MIN**	**QUE**	**TOR**	**Total**
Calgary	3−1	1−2−1	2−2	1−1−2	2−2	**9−8−3**
N.Y. Islanders	2−2	2−2	2−0−2	3−1	3−1	**12−6−2**
N.Y. Rangers	2−2	1−2−1	1−1−2	1−1−2	2−2	**7−8−5**
Philadelphia	2−2	0−2−2	2−1−1	1−2−1	0−2−2	**5−9−6**
Washington	1−2−1	0−2−2	0−3−1	0−4	3−1	**4−12−4**

**Vs. Norris Division**

1980–81 NHL records
Team	**DET**	**HFD**	**LAK**	**MTL**	**PIT**	**Total**
Calgary	2−1−1	3−1	3−1	1−2−1	2−1−1	**11−6−3**
N.Y. Islanders	4−0	2−0−2	2−2	2−1−1	1−2−1	**11−5−4**
N.Y. Rangers	1−2−1	3−1	1−3	1−2−1	1−2−1	**7−10−3**
Philadelphia	3−1	3−0−1	4−0	1−2−1	4−0	**15−3−2**
Washington	2−1−1	3−1	1−2−1	0−2−2	1−2−1	**7−8−5**

== Schedule and results ==
1980–81 regular season
October: 5–4–2 (home: 3–1–1; road: 2–3–1)

Game	Date	Visitor	Score	Home	OT	Record	Pts	Attendance
1	October 9	Quebec	5 – 5	Calgary	OT	0–0–1	1	7,243
2	October 11	Calgary	2 – 6	Colorado		0–1–1	1	7,564
3	October 12	Calgary	3 – 3	Chicago	OT	0–1–2	2	10,923
4	October 14	Los Angeles	2 – 4	Calgary		1–1–2	4	7,126
5	October 16	Boston	1 – 2	Calgary		2–1–2	6	7,229
6	October 18	Minnesota	2 – 6	Calgary		3–1–2	8	7,139
7	October 22	Calgary	3 – 5	Edmonton		3–2–2	8	17,396
8	October 23	Toronto	5 – 4	Calgary		3–3–2	8	7,243
9	October 25	Calgary	8 – 2	Pittsburgh		4–3–2	10	9,363
10	October 28	Calgary	0 – 8	Philadelphia		4–4–2	10	17,077
11	October 30	Calgary	3 – 1	Boston		5–4–2	12	8,774

November: 5–5–3 (home: 2–1–1; road: 3–4–2)

Game	Date	Visitor	Score	Home	OT	Record	Pts	Attendance
12	November 1	Calgary	3 – 2	St. Louis		6–4–2	14	12,559
13	November 2	Calgary	3 – 8	Minnesota		6–5–2	14	11,531
14	November 5	Calgary	5 – 5	Winnipeg	OT	6–5–3	15	10,500
15	November 8	St. Louis	2 – 4	Calgary		7–5–3	17	7,243
16	November 11	NY Rangers	3 – 7	Calgary		8–5–3	19	7,243
17	November 13	Chicago	4 – 4	Calgary	OT	8–5–4	20	7,243
18	November 16	Colorado	4 – 3	Calgary		8–6–4	20	7,243
19	November 20	Calgary	2 – 4	Washington		8–7–4	20	8,721
20	November 22	Calgary	3 – 3	Quebec	OT	8–7–5	21	10,185
21	November 25	Calgary	5 – 4	Montreal		9–7–5	23	16,020
22	November 27	Calgary	3 – 6	Buffalo		9–8–5	23	16,433
23	November 29	Calgary	3 – 9	St. Louis		9–9–5	23	15,541
24	November 30	Calgary	4 – 1	Winnipeg		10–9–5	25	12,867

December: 6–3–3 (home: 4–2–2; road: 2–1–1)

Game	Date	Visitor	Score	Home	OT	Record	Pts	Attendance
25	December 4	Winnipeg	3 – 1	Calgary		11–9–5	27	7,077
26	December 6	Hartford	5 – 3	Calgary		11–10–5	27	7,083
27	December 8	Calgary	4 – 2	Los Angeles		12–10–5	29	7,673
28	December 11	Buffalo	4 – 8	Calgary		13–10–5	31	7,226
29	December 13	NY Islanders	4 – 4	Calgary	OT	13–10–6	32	7,243
30	December 18	Montreal	4 – 0	Calgary		13–11–6	32	7,243
31	December 20	Pittsburgh	3 – 3	Calgary	OT	13–11–7	33	7,123
32	December 22	Calgary	3 – 2	NY Rangers		14–11–7	35	17,418
33	December 23	Calgary	2 – 2	NY Islanders	OT	14–11–8	36	14,950
34	December 26	Calgary	2 – 5	Colorado		14–12–8	36	11,849
35	December 27	Philadelphia	1 – 2	Calgary		15–12–8	38	7,243
36	December 30	Edmonton	3 – 5	Calgary		16–12–8	40	7,243

January: 6–7–3 (home: 5–0–3; road: 1–7–0)

Game	Date	Visitor	Score	Home	OT	Record	Pts	Attendance
37	January 2	Los Angeles	6 – 7	Calgary		17–12–8	42	7,243
38	January 4	Toronto	5 – 8	Calgary		18–12–8	44	7,243
39	January 5	Calgary	2 – 5	Los Angeles		18–13–8	44	8,256
40	January 8	Washington	0 – 6	Calgary		19–13–8	46	7,243
41	January 10	Calgary	1 – 4	Detroit		19–14–8	46	16,014
42	January 11	Calgary	1 – 2	Chicago		19–15–8	46	8,667
43	January 13	NY Rangers	4 – 4	Calgary	OT	19–15–9	47	7,226
44	January 15	Detroit	0 – 10	Calgary		20–15–9	49	7,226
45	January 17	Winnipeg	2 – 4	Calgary		21–15–9	51	7,243
46	January 19	Calgary	3 – 6	NY Rangers		21–16–9	51	17,415
47	January 20	Calgary	0 – 5	NY Islanders		21–17–9	51	15,008
48	January 23	Calgary	4 – 2	Hartford		22–17–9	53	10,206
49	January 24	Calgary	3 – 4	Pittsburgh		22–18–9	53	9,360
50	January 26	Calgary	2 – 3	Minnesota		22–19–9	53	11,971
51	January 29	Montreal	4 – 4	Calgary	OT	22–19–10	54	7,243
52	January 31	Chicago	3 – 3	Calgary	OT	22–19–11	55	7,223

February: 9–2–1 (home: 7–1–1; road: 2–1–0)

Game	Date	Visitor	Score	Home	OT	Record	Pts	Attendance
53	February 1	Calgary	2 – 6	Vancouver		22–20–11	55	15,716
54	February 5	Washington	5 – 2	Calgary		23–20–11	57	7,226
55	February 7	Pittsburgh	4 – 5	Calgary		24–20–11	59	7,222
56	February 8	Calgary	10 – 4	Edmonton		25–20–11	61	17,490
57	February 12	Quebec	3 – 5	Calgary		26–20–11	63	7,225
58	February 14	Buffalo	4 – 4	Calgary	OT	26–20–12	64	7,226
59	February 17	St. Louis	5 – 2	Calgary		26–21–12	64	7,226
60	February 19	Philadelphia	4 – 5	Calgary		27–21–12	66	7,225
61	February 21	Boston	2 – 7	Calgary		28–21–12	68	7,226
62	February 22	Calgary	5 – 3	Vancouver		29–21–12	70	13,456
63	February 25	NY Islanders	4 – 11	Calgary		30–21–12	72	7,226
64	February 27	Hartford	1 – 5	Calgary		31–21–12	74	7,226

March: 6–6–2 (home: 2–0–2; road: 4–6–0)

Game	Date	Visitor	Score	Home	OT	Record	Pts	Attendance
65	March 3	Calgary	6 – 3	Washington		32–21–12	76	8,164
66	March 4	Calgary	0 – 4	Buffalo		32–22–12	76	16,298
67	March 7	Calgary	6 – 4	Toronto		32–22–12	78	16,485
68	March 8	Calgary	5 – 4	Hartford		33–22–12	80	10,171
69	March 10	Vancouver	2 – 11	Calgary		35–22–12	82	7,226
70	March 12	Minnesota	3 – 6	Calgary		36–22–12	84	7,226
71	March 15	Edmonton	3 – 3	Calgary	OT	36–22–13	85	7,226
72	March 19	Calgary	6 – 3	Detroit		37–22–13	87	12,117
73	March 21	Calgary	3 – 4	Boston		37–23–13	87	11,452
74	March 22	Calgary	2 – 6	Philadelphia		37–24–13	87	17,077
75	March 25	Calgary	2 – 4	Quebec		37–25–13	87	14,970
76	March 26	Calgary	2 – 8	Montreal		37–26–13	87	16,464
77	March 28	Calgary	5 – 9	Toronto		37–27–13	87	16,485
78	March 31	Detroit	5 – 5	Calgary	OT	37–27–14	88	7,226

April: 2–0–0 (home: 2–0–0; road: 0–0–0)

Game	Date	Visitor	Score	Home	OT	Record	Pts	Attendance
79	April 2	Colorado	3 – 5	Calgary		38–27–14	90	7,226
80	April 4	Vancouver	5 – 6	Calgary		39–27–14	92	7,226

Legend: Win (2 points) Loss (0 points) Tie (1 point)

== Playoffs ==
1981 Stanley Cup playoffs
Preliminary Round vs. Chicago Black Hawks – Flames win 3–0

Game	Date	Visitor	Score	Home	OT	Series	Attendance
1	April 8	Chicago	3 – 4	Calgary		Calgary leads 1–0	7,226
2	April 9	Chicago	2 – 6	Calgary		Calgary leads 2–0	7,226
3	April 11	Calgary	5 – 4	Chicago	2OT	Calgary wins 3–0	12,482

Quarterfinals vs. Philadelphia Flyers – Flames win 4–3

Game	Date	Visitor	Score	Home	OT	Series	Attendance
1	April 16	Calgary	0 – 4	Philadelphia		Philadelphia leads 1–0	17,077
2	April 17	Calgary	5 – 4	Philadelphia		Series tied 1–1	17,077
3	April 19	Philadelphia	1 – 2	Calgary		Calgary leads 2–1	7,226
4	April 20	Philadelphia	4 – 5	Calgary		Calgary leads 3–1	7,226
5	April 22	Calgary	4 – 9	Philadelphia		Calgary leads 3–2	17,077
6	April 24	Philadelphia	3 – 2	Calgary		Series tied 3–3	7,226
7	April 26	Calgary	4 – 1	Philadelphia		Calgary wins 4–3	17,077

Semifinals vs. Minnesota North Stars – North Stars win 4–2

Game	Date	Visitor	Score	Home	OT	Series	Attendance
1	April 28	Minnesota	4 – 1	Calgary		Minnesota leads 1–0	7,226
2	April 30	Minnesota	2 – 3	Calgary		Series tied 1–1	7,226
3	May 3	Calgary	4 – 6	Minnesota		Minnesota leads 2–1	15,784
4	May 5	Calgary	4 – 7	Minnesota		Minnesota leads 3–1	15,784
5	May 7	Minnesota	1 – 3	Calgary		Minnesota leads 3–2	7,226
6	May 9	Calgary	3 – 5	Minnesota		Minnesota wins 4–2	15,784

Legend: Win Loss

== Player statistics ==
=== Skaters ===
Note: GP = Games played; G = Goals; A = Assists; Pts = Points; PIM = Penalty minutes

		Regular season					Playoffs
Player	#	GP	G	A	Pts	PIM	GP	G	A	Pts	PIM
Kent Nilsson	14	80	49	**82**	**131**	26	16	3	14	17	4
Guy Chouinard	16	52	31	52	83	24	16	3	14	17	4
Willi Plett	25	78	38	30	68	239	15	8	4	12	89
Paul Reinhart	23	74	18	49	67	52	16	1	14	15	16
Eric Vail	27	64	28	36	64	23	6	0	0	0	0
Bob MacMillan	11	77	28	35	63	47	16	8	6	14	7
Don Lever	12	62	26	31	57	56	16	4	7	11	20
Pekka Rautakallio	4	76	11	45	56	64	16	2	4	6	6
Jim Peplinski	24	80	13	25	38	108	16	2	3	5	11
Kevin LaVallee	15	77	15	20	35	16	8	2	3	5	4
Bill Clement	10	78	12	20	32	33	16	2	1	3	6
Ken Houston	6	42	15	15	30	93	16	7	8	15	30
Phil Russell	5	80	6	23	29	104	16	2	7	9	29
Bob Murdoch	20	74	3	19	22	54	16	1	4	5	36
Dan Labraaten^{†}	21	27	9	7	16	13	5	1	0	1	4
Jamie Hislop^{†}	17	29	6	9	15	11	16	3	0	3	5
Brad Marsh	22	80	1	12	13	87	16	0	5	5	8
Bert Wilson	8	50	5	7	12	94	1	0	0	0	0
Brad Smith	18	45	7	4	11	65	–	–	–	–	–
Alex McKendry	26	36	3	6	9	19	–	–	–	–	–
Earl Ingarfield^{‡}	21	16	2	3	5	6	–	–	–	–	–
Denis Cyr	9	10	1	4	5	0	–	–	–	–	–
Randy Holt	7	48	0	5	5	165	13	2	2	4	52
Dan Bouchard^{‡}	30	14	0	4	4	6	–	–	–	–	–
Dave Hindmarch	18	1	1	0	1	0	6	0	0	0	2
Greg Meredith	29	3	1	0	1	0	–	–	–	–	–
Mike Dwyer	29	4	0	1	1	4	1	1	0	1	0
Gord Wappel	2	7	0	1	1	4	–	–	–	–	–
Rejean Lemelin	1	29	0	1	1	2	6	0	0	0	0
Pat Riggin	31	42	0	1	1	7	11	0	0	0	0
Tony Curtale	3	2	0	0	0	0	–	–	–	–	–
Bobby Gould	19	3	0	0	0	0	11	3	1	4	4
Steve Konroyd	3	4	0	0	0	4	–	–	–	–	–

^{†}Denotes player spent time with another team before joining Calgary. Stats reflect time with the Flames only. ^{‡}Traded mid-season.
Bold denotes franchise record.

=== Goaltenders ===
Note: GP = Games played; TOI = Time on ice (minutes); W = Wins; L = Losses; OT = Overtime/shootout losses; GA = Goals against; SO = Shutouts; GAA = Goals against average

		Regular season								Playoffs
Player	#	GP	TOI	W	L	T	GA	SO	GAA	GP	TOI	W	L	GA	SO	GAA
Rejean Lemelin	1	29	1629	14	6	7	88	2	3.24	6	366	3	3	22	0	3.61
Pat Riggin	31	42	2411	21	16	4	154	0	3.83	11	629	6	3	37	0	3.53
Dan Bouchard	30	14	760	4	5	3	51	0	4.06	–	–	–	–	–	–	–.--

== Transactions ==
The Flames were involved in the following transactions during the 1980–81 season.

=== Trades ===
June 2, 1980	To Calgary Flames 2nd round pick in 1980 Entry Draft (Steve Konroyd); 2nd round pick in 1981 Entry Draft (Mike Vernon)	To Boston Bruins Jim Craig
June 8, 1980	To Calgary Flames Randy Holt; Bert Wilson	To Los Angeles Kings Garry Unger
June 10, 1980	To Calgary Flames 2nd round pick in 1980 Entry Draft (Kevin LaVallee)	To Toronto Maple Leafs Dave Shand; 3rd round pick in 1980 Entry Draft (traded to Washington Capitals; Capitals selected Torrie Robertson)
July 1, 1980	To Calgary Flames Cash	To Washington Capitals Jean Pronovost
October 9, 1980	To Calgary Flames Alex McKendry	To New York Islanders 3rd round pick in 1981 Entry Draft (Ron Handy)
January 30, 1981	To Calgary Flames Jamie Hislop	To Quebec Nordiques Dan Bouchard
February 3, 1981	To Calgary Flames Dan Labraaten	To Detroit Red Wings Earl Ingarfield
February 24, 1981	To Calgary Flames Future Considerations	To Detroit Red Wings Brad Smith

=== Free agents ===
Player	Former team
LW Mike Dwyer	Colorado Rockies
C Bob Francis	University of New Hampshire (NCAA)
D Charlie Bourgeois	Université de Moncton (CIAU)

Player	New team

== Draft picks ==
Calgary's picks at the 1980 NHL entry draft, held in Montreal.

Rnd	Pick	Player	Nationality	Position	Team (league)	NHL statistics				
Rnd	Pick	Player	Nationality	Position	Team (league)	GP	G	A	Pts	PIM
1	13	Denis Cyr	Canada	RW	Montreal Junior Canadiens (QMJHL)	193	41	43	84	36
2	31	Tony Curtale	United States	D	Brantford Alexanders (OHA)	2	0	0	0	0
2	32	Kevin LaVallee	Canada	F	Brantford Alexanders (OHA)	366	110	125	235	85
2	39	Steve Konroyd	Canada	D	Oshawa Generals (OHA)	895	41	195	236	863
4	76	Marc Roy	Canada	RW	Chicoutimi Saguenéens (QMJHL)					
5	97	Randy Turnbull	Canada	D	Portland Winter Hawks (WHL)	1	0	0	0	2
6	118	John Multan	Canada	RW	Portland Winter Hawks (WHL)					
7	139	Dave Newsom	Canada	LW	Brantford Alexanders (OHA)					
8	160	Claude Drouin	Canada	C	Quebec Remparts (QMJHL)					
9	181	Hakan Loob	Sweden	F	Färjestad BK (SEL)	450	193	236	429	189
10	202	Steven Fletcher	Canada	LW	Hull Olympiques (QMJHL)	3	0	0	0	5

== See also ==
- 1980–81 NHL season
