= Peter Madach =

Swedish ice hockey player

- Born: February 26, 1963 (age 63) ?, Sweden
- Position: Forward
- Played for: SEL; HV 71; AIK; GET-ligaen; Storhamar Dragons
- NHL draft: 78th overall, 1981; Calgary Flames
- Playing career: 1979–1996

Peter Madach (born February 26, 1963) is a Swedish former professional ice hockey forward who spent most of his career in the GET-ligaen, but also played parts of his career in the Swedish Hockey League with HV71. He was named Årets Junior in Swedish ice hockey, after the 1979–80 season. He was drafted into the National Hockey League by the Calgary Flames 78th overall in the 1981 NHL entry draft. He has represented the Swedish national junior team two times internationally, both at the IIHF World Junior Championship, winning 1 gold medal in West Germany in early January 1981 and the other one he returned home to Sweden empty-handed.

Peter Madach
Medal record

Representing Sweden

Ice hockey

World Junior Championships
Gold medal – first place	1981 Füssen	
