= Bill Schafhauser =

American ice hockey player

- Born: March 12, 1962 (age 64) Saint Paul, Minnesota, USA
- Height: 6 ft 0 in (183 cm)
- Weight: 179 lb (81 kg; 12 st 11 lb)
- Position: Defenseman
- Shot: Left
- Played for: Northern Michigan; Kalamazoo Wings; Hershey Bears; Ritten Sport; SC Herisau; EV Zug
- National team: United States
- NHL draft: 117th, 1981; Chicago Black Hawks
- Playing career: 1980–1996

William Schafhauser is an American retired ice hockey defenseman and head coach who was an All-American for Northern Michigan.

== Career ==
Schafhauser began attending Northern Michigan University in the fall of 1980, immediately after the program had appeared in its first national championship game. As a freshman, Schafhauser helped the team return to the Frozen Four where they were defeated by eventual champion Wisconsin. After the season he was drafted by the Chicago Black Hawks in the 6th round of the NHL entry draft and then selected to play for the US junior team at the 1982 World Junior Ice Hockey Championships. The team finished a disappointing 6th place.

After returning to Marquette, Schafhauser, who was now team captain, found his team struggling to compete in the new-look CCHA. Four teams from the WCHA had joined over the previous summer and the Wildcats were having a hard time keeping up. NMU dropped from 1st to 8th in the conference and were swept out of the conference quarterfinals. The program recovered a bit in Schafhauser's junior season, rising to 5th in the CCHA and finished 3rd in the CCHA Tournament. In his senior season, Schafhauser helped the club to a 4th-place finish but they possessed a losing record overall. Despite the poor record for his team, Schafhauser was named an All-American that season and followed his collegiate career by signing a professional contract.

He played most of the next three seasons for the Kalamazoo Wings but spent 8 games with the Hershey Bears in 1985–86. After wallowing in AA hockey, Schafhauser travelled to Europe and was a point-per-game player for Ritten Sport in 1988, but couldn't help the team stave off relegation. He found himself playing in the Swiss 'B' League the following season and played well enough to earn a contract with EV Zug in the 'A' League for 1990. Schafhauser remained with Zug for seven seasons, the last three serving as alternate captain, and helped the club capture the regular season title in 1995. They finished as tournament runners-up that year.

After retiring as a player, Schafhauser returned home to Minnesota and eventually became the head coach for the Hill-Murray School girls' ice hockey team. He coached at his alma mater for 13 seasons, leading to the team to a state championship in 2014 and 2015. He retired after the 2020 season. He was inducted into the Northern Michigan Athletic Hall of Fame in 2008.

== Statistics ==
=== Regular season and playoffs ===
			Regular Season					Playoffs
Season	Team	League	GP	G	A	Pts	PIM	GP	G	A	Pts	PIM
1978–79	Hill-Murray School	MN-HS	—	—	—	—	—	—	—	—	—	—
1979–80	Hill-Murray School	MN-HS	—	—	—	—	—	—	—	—	—	—
1980–81	Northern Michigan	CCHA	44	3	12	15	38	—	—	—	—	—
1981–82	Northern Michigan	CCHA	35	5	16	21	42	—	—	—	—	—
1982–83	Northern Michigan	CCHA	40	5	14	19	24	—	—	—	—	—
1983–84	Northern Michigan	CCHA	39	6	21	27	34	—	—	—	—	—
1984–85	Kalamazoo Wings	IHL	82	11	30	41	87	—	—	—	—	—
1985–86	Kalamazoo Wings	IHL	75	9	45	54	46	—	—	—	—	—
1985–86	Hershey Bears	AHL	8	0	1	1	2	—	—	—	—	—
1986–87	Kalamazoo Wings	IHL	82	6	49	55	52	—	—	—	—	—
1987–88	SV Ritten	Serie A	36	10	28	38	18	—	—	—	—	—
1988–89	SC Herisau	NLB	33	3	11	14	40	10	1	3	4	8
1989–90	EV Zug	NLA	36	2	5	7	41	2	0	1	1	2
1990–91	EV Zug	NLA	36	5	7	12	65	3	0	0	0	10
1991–92	EV Zug	NLA	36	5	9	14	36	5	0	1	1	2
1992–93	EV Zug	NLA	36	3	10	13	28	5	0	2	2	6
1993–94	EV Zug	NLA	36	4	9	13	20	9	4	4	8	6
1994–95	EV Zug	NLA	36	4	8	12	43	12	2	3	5	12
1995–96	EV Zug	NLA	26	2	2	4	47	9	1	1	2	14
NCAA totals			158	19	63	82	138	—	—	—	—	—
IHL totals			239	26	124	150	185	—	—	—	—	—
NLA totals			242	25	50	75	280	45	7	12	19	52

=== International ===
Year	Team	Event	Result	GP	G	A	Pts	PIM
1982	United States	WJC	6th	7	1	0	1	6
1989	United States	Spengler Cup	4th	5	0	1	1	—

== Awards and honors ==
Award	Year
AHCA West Second-Team All-American	1983–84
