= Perry Pelensky =

Canadian ice hockey player

- Born: March 20, 1962 (age 64) Edmonton, Alberta, Canada
- Height: 6 ft 1 in (185 cm)
- Weight: 190 lb (86 kg; 13 st 8 lb)
- Position: Right wing
- Shot: Right
- Played for: Chicago Black Hawks
- NHL draft: 75th overall, 1981; Chicago Black Hawks
- Playing career: 1982–1985

Perry Pelensky (born May 22, 1962) is a Canadian former professional ice hockey player who played four games in the National Hockey League with the Chicago Black Hawks during the 1983–84 season.

== Career statistics ==
=== Regular season and playoffs ===
			Regular season					Playoffs
Season	Team	League	GP	G	A	Pts	PIM	GP	G	A	Pts	PIM
1979–80	Fort Saskatchewan Traders	AJHL	59	55	59	114	105	—	—	—	—	—
1979–80	Portland Winterhawks	WHL	—	—	—	—	—	5	0	0	0	0
1980–81	Portland Winterhawks	WHL	65	35	32	67	124	9	7	2	9	30
1981–82	Portland Winterhawks	WHL	71	40	46	86	192	15	10	5	15	41
1982–83	Springfield Indians	AHL	80	15	25	40	89	—	—	—	—	—
1983–84	Springfield Indians	AHL	73	22	16	38	185	4	0	1	1	9
1983–84	Chicago Black Hawks	NHL	4	0	0	0	5	—	—	—	—	—
1984–85	Milwaukee Admirals	IHL	82	21	39	60	222	—	—	—	—	—
AHL totals			153	37	41	78	274	4	0	1	1	9
NHL totals			4	0	0	0	5	—	—	—	—	—
