= Dave Logan (ice hockey) =

Canadian ice hockey player

- Born: July 2, 1954 (age 72) Montreal, Quebec, Canada
- Height: 5 ft 10 in (178 cm)
- Weight: 190 lb (86 kg; 13 st 8 lb)
- Position: Defence
- Shot: Left
- Played for: Chicago Black Hawks; Vancouver Canucks
- NHL draft: 88th overall, 1974; Chicago Black Hawks
- WHA draft: 97th overall, 1974; Quebec Nordiques
- Playing career: 1974–1983

David George Logan (born July 2, 1954) is a Canadian former professional ice hockey player.

== Early life ==
Logan was born in Montreal. As a youth, he played in the 1966 and 1967 Quebec International Pee-Wee Hockey Tournaments with a minor ice hockey team from Dorval.

== Career ==
Between 1974 and 1983, Logan played in 218 NHL games with the Chicago Black Hawks and Vancouver Canucks over parts of six seasons. After appearing in twelve games with two goals and three assists to start the 1979–80 campaign and at odds with coach Eddie Johnston, he was dealt along with Harold Phillipoff from the Black Hawks to the Canucks for Ron Sedlbauer on December 21.

== Career statistics ==
			Regular season					Playoffs
Season	Team	League	GP	G	A	Pts	PIM	GP	G	A	Pts	PIM
1971–72	Montreal Junior Canadiens	OHA	57	20	17	37	53	—	—	—	—	—
1972–73	Montreal Bleu Blanc Rouge	QMJHL	5	1	5	6	2	—	—	—	—	—
1973–74	Laval National	QMJHL	65	21	41	62	156	11	2	2	4	36
1974–75	Dallas Black Hawks	CHL	74	7	18	25	239	10	0	3	3	48
1975–76	Chicago Blackhawks	NHL	2	0	0	0	0	—	—	—	—	—
1975–76	Dallas Black Hawks	CHL	40	3	11	14	131	10	0	3	3	68
1976–77	Chicago Blackhawks	NHL	34	0	2	2	61	—	—	—	—	—
1976–77	Dallas Black Hawks	CHL	32	4	10	14	83	5	0	1	1	16
1976–77	Flint Generals	IHL	1	0	0	0	2	—	—	—	—	—
1977–78	Chicago Blackhawks	NHL	54	1	5	6	77	4	0	0	0	8
1978–78	Chicago Blackhawks	NHL	76	1	14	15	176	4	0	0	0	2
1979–80	Chicago Blackhawks	NHL	12	2	3	5	34	—	—	—	—	—
1979–80	Vancouver Canucks	NHL	33	1	5	6	109	4	0	0	0	0
1980–81	Vancouver Canucks	NHL	7	0	0	0	13	—	—	—	—	—
1980–81	Dallas Black Hawks	CHL	23	1	8	9	28	—	—	—	—	—
1980–81	Maine Mariners	AHL	13	2	1	3	27	18	0	3	3	129
1980–81	Cincinnati Tigers	CHL	53	4	12	16	199	4	0	0	0	36
1982–83	St. Catharines Saints	AHL	12	2	2	4	2	—	—	—	—	—
1982–83	Birmingham South Stars	CHL	63	1	7	8	176	10	0	1	1	20
NHL totals			218	5	29	34	470	12	0	0	0	10
