= Harold Phillipoff =

Canadian ice hockey player (born 1956)

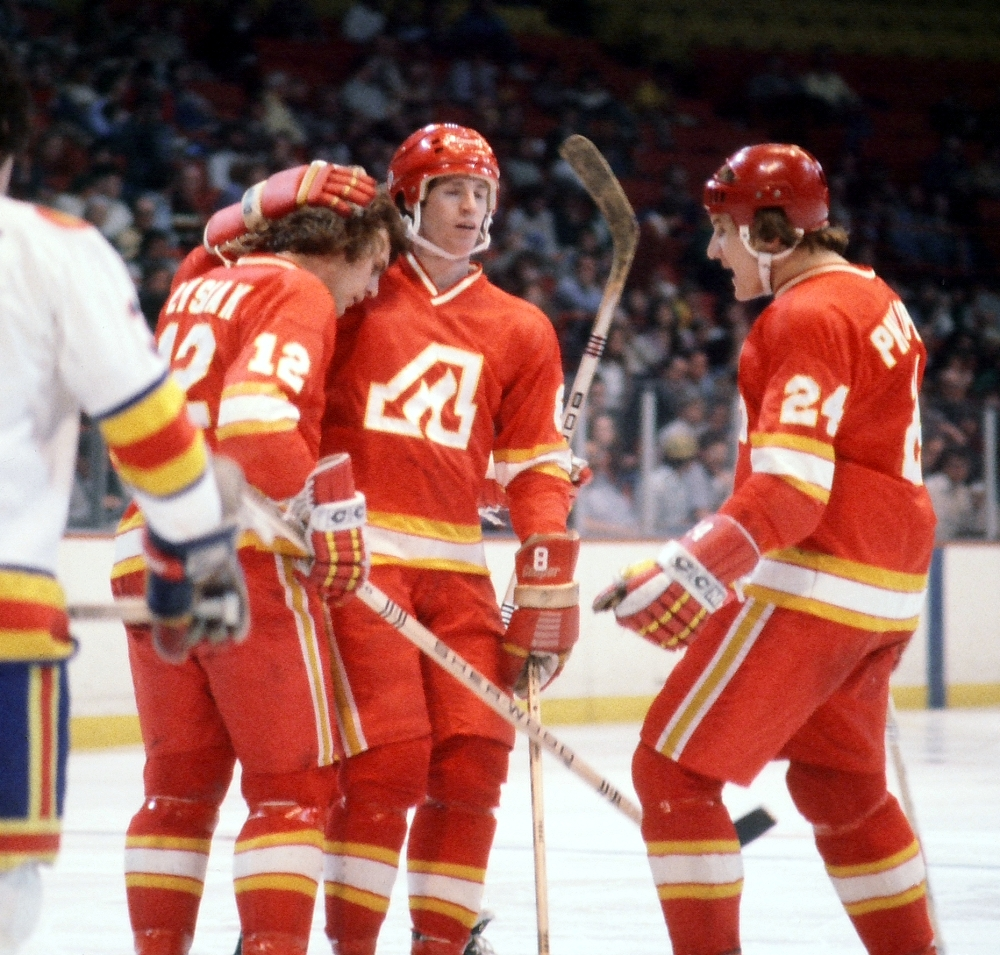
- Tom Lysiak celebrates with Dave Shand and Harold Phillipoff (r) after a goal against the Colorado Rockies in 1978
- Born: February 14, 1956 (age 70) Kamsack, Saskatchewan, Canada
- Height: 6 ft 3 in (191 cm)
- Weight: 220 lb (100 kg; 15 st 10 lb)
- Position: Left wing
- Shot: Left
- Played for: Atlanta Flames; Chicago Black Hawks
- NHL draft: 10th overall, 1976; Atlanta Flames
- WHA draft: 28th overall, 1976; Edmonton Oilers
- Playing career: 1976–1982

Harold Michael Phillipoff (born February 14, 1956) is a Canadian former professional ice hockey left winger. He was drafted in the first round, 10th overall, by the Atlanta Flames in the 1976 NHL Amateur Draft. He played in 141 games in the National Hockey League: 118 with the Flames (from 1977-1979) and 23 with the Chicago Black Hawks (from 1980-1981).

In 1979, he was traded from the Atlanta Flames with Greg Fox, Tom Lysiak, Pat Ribble and Miles Zaharko to the Chicago Black Hawks for Ivan Boldirev, Darcy Rota and Phil Russell. After appearing in nine games without a goal or an assist to start the 1979–80 season, he was dealt along with Dave Logan from the Black Hawks to the Vancouver Canucks for Ron Sedlbauer on December 21.

Phillipoff was also drafted by the Edmonton Oilers of the World Hockey Association; however, he never played in that league.

== Personal life ==
Phillipoff was born in Kamsack, Saskatchewan and raised in Canora, Saskatchewan.

== Career statistics ==
			Regular season					Playoffs
Season	Team	League	GP	G	A	Pts	PIM	GP	G	A	Pts	PIM
1973–74	Bellingham Blazers	BCJHL	61	27	35	62	182	—	—	—	—	—
1973–74	New Westminster Bruins	WCHL	2	1	0	1	0	11	0	1	1	45
1974–75	New Westminster Bruins	WCHL	70	26	32	58	280	18	6	12	18	94
1975–76	New Westminster Bruins	WCHL	67	38	51	89	146	15	7	9	16	28
1976–77	Nova Scotia Voyageurs	AHL	67	6	16	22	155	12	1	2	3	8
1977–78	Atlanta Flames	NHL	67	17	36	53	128	2	0	1	1	2
1978–79	Atlanta Flames	NHL	51	9	17	26	113	—	—	—	—	—
1978–79	Chicago Black Hawks	NHL	14	0	4	4	6	4	0	1	1	7
1979–80	Chicago Black Hawks	NHL	9	0	0	0	20	—	—	—	—	—
1980–81	Dallas Black Hawks	CHL	75	26	37	63	121	2	4	0	4	7
1981–82	Oklahoma City Stars	CHL	13	1	5	6	44	—	—	—	—	—
1981–82	Fredericton Express	AHL	58	19	28	47	122	—	—	—	—	—
NHL totals			141	26	57	83	267	6	0	2	2	9

Preceded by David Shand	Atlanta Flames first-round draft pick 1976	Succeeded by Brad Marsh
