= Dan Wood (ice hockey) =

Canadian ice hockey player

- Born: October 31, 1962 (age 63) Toronto, Ontario, Canada
- Height: 5 ft 11 in (180 cm)
- Weight: 190 lb (86 kg; 13 st 8 lb)
- Position: Right wing
- Shot: Right
- Played for: Springfield Indians; Fredericton Express; Peoria Rivermen
- National team: Canada
- NHL draft: 188th overall, 1981; St. Louis Blues
- Playing career: 1981–1986

Daniel Phillip Wood (born October 31, 1962) is a Canadian former ice hockey player who was a member of the 1984 Canadian Olympic team, which finished out of the medals at the Sarajevo Games. He was selected by the St. Louis Blues in the 9th round (188th overall) of the 1981 NHL entry draft.
