= Vladimír Svitek =

Slovak ice hockey player (1962–2020)

- Born: 19 October 1962 Banská Bystrica, Czechoslovakia
- Died: 17 February 2020 (aged 57) Košice, Slovakia
- Height: 6 ft 2 in (188 cm)
- Weight: 192 lb (87 kg; 13 st 10 lb)
- Position: Right wing
- Shot: Right
- Played for: HC Košice; HPK; EK Zell am See; HK Triglav Kranj; HK Spišská Nová Ves; HK Trebišov
- National team: Czechoslovakia
- NHL draft: 137th overall, 1981; Philadelphia Flyers
- Playing career: 1980–2001

Vladimír Svitek (19 October 1962 – 17 February 2020) was a Slovak professional ice hockey player who played in the Czechoslovak First Ice Hockey League, Finnish Liiga, and Slovak Extraliga. Svitek was drafted in the seventh round of the 1981 NHL entry draft by the Philadelphia Flyers, but he never played professionally in North America. He spent the first ten seasons of his playing career with HC Košice and his final ten seasons in various European leagues.
