= Mike Dwyer (ice hockey) =

Canadian ice hockey player (born 1957)

- Born: September 16, 1957 (age 68) Brampton, Ontario, Canada
- Height: 5 ft 11 in (180 cm)
- Weight: 172 lb (78 kg; 12 st 4 lb)
- Position: Left wing
- Shot: Left
- Played for: Colorado Rockies; Calgary Flames
- NHL draft: 74th overall, 1977; Colorado Rockies
- WHA draft: 82nd overall, 1977; Houston Aeros
- Playing career: 1977–1983

Michael Dwyer (born September 16, 1957) is a Canadian former professional ice hockey forward.

== Early life ==
Dwyer was born in Brampton, Ontario. As a youth, he played in the 1970 Quebec International Pee-Wee Hockey Tournament with a minor ice hockey team from Toronto.

== Career ==
Dwyer was drafted by both the Colorado Rockies in the fifth round, 74th overall in the 1977 NHL entry draft and by the Houston Aeros in the 10th round, 82nd overall of the 1977 WHA Entry Draft.

Dwyer played 32 National Hockey League games for the Rockies and the Calgary Flames over parts of four seasons between 1978–79 and 1981–82, recording three goals and six assists. He spent much of his professional career playing for several teams in the Central Hockey League.

== Career statistics ==
=== Regular season and playoffs ===
			Regular season					Playoffs
Season	Team	League	GP	G	A	Pts	PIM	GP	G	A	Pts	PIM
1975–76	Windsor Spitfires	OMJHL	42	20	28	48	24	—	—	—	—	—
1976–77	Windsor Spitfires	OMJHL	5	5	1	6	11	—	—	—	—	—
1976–77	Niagara Falls Flyers	OMJHL	59	30	38	68	127	—	—	—	—	—
1977–78	Hampton Gulls	AHL	9	2	1	3	4	—	—	—	—	—
1977–78	Phoenix Roadrunners	CHL	25	12	8	20	16	—	—	—	—	—
1978–79	Colorado Rockies	NHL	12	2	3	5	2	—	—	—	—	—
1978–79	Philadelphia Firebirds	AHL	60	20	27	47	52	—	—	—	—	—
1979–80	Colorado Rockies	NHL	10	0	0	0	19	—	—	—	—	—
1979–80	Fort Worth Texans	CHL	13	3	4	7	22	—	—	—	—	—
1979–80	Birmingham Bulls	CHL	40	16	18	34	90	—	—	—	—	—
1980–81	Calgary Flames	NHL	4	0	1	1	4	1	1	0	1	0
1980–81	Birmingham Bulls	CHL	49	16	34	50	135	—	—	—	—	—
1980–81	Wichita Wind	CHL	12	8	8	16	28	15	6	11	17	36
1981–82	Calgary Flames	NHL	5	0	2	2	0	—	—	—	—	—
1981–82	Oklahoma City Stars	CHL	28	9	21	30	35	—	—	—	—	—
1982–83	Colorado Flames	CHL	51	15	33	48	61	6	4	4	8	2
CHL totals			218	79	126	205	387	21	10	15	25	38
NHL totals			31	2	6	8	25	1	1	0	1	0
