= Dan Bourbonnais =

Canadian ice hockey player

- Born: March 6, 1962 (age 64) Winnipeg, Manitoba, Canada
- Height: 5 ft 10 in (178 cm)
- Weight: 183 lb (83 kg; 13 st 1 lb)
- Position: Left wing
- Shot: Left
- Played for: HC Caen; Heerenveen Flyers; Hartford Whalers
- NHL draft: 103rd overall, 1981; Hartford Whalers
- Playing career: 1981–1990

Daniel Richard Bourbonnais (born March 6, 1962) is a Canadian former professional ice hockey left winger who played two seasons in the National Hockey League with the Hartford Whalers between 1981 and 1984. He was drafted 103rd overall by the Whalers in the 1981 NHL entry draft. He played fifty-nine career NHL games, scoring three goals and adding twenty-five assists for twenty-eight points.

== Career statistics ==
=== Regular season and playoffs ===
			Regular season					Playoffs
Season	Team	League	GP	G	A	Pts	PIM	GP	G	A	Pts	PIM
1978–79	Pincher Creek Panthers	AJHL	60	17	41	58	36	—	—	—	—	—
1978–79	Calgary Wranglers	WHL	2	0	2	2	0	—	—	—	—	—
1979–80	Calgary Wranglers	WHL	66	14	29	43	41	6	2	2	4	0
1980–81	Calgary Wranglers	WHL	72	41	62	103	34	22	5	10	15	28
1981–82	Calgary Wranglers	WHL	50	27	32	59	175	9	6	4	10	17
1981–82	Hartford Whalers	NHL	24	3	9	12	11	—	—	—	—	—
1982–83	Binghamton Whalers	AHL	75	31	33	64	24	5	4	0	4	0
1983–84	Hartford Whalers	NHL	35	0	16	16	0	—	—	—	—	—
1984–85	Binghamton Whalers	AHL	56	13	22	35	17	—	—	—	—	—
1987–88	Heerenveen Flyers	NED	46	46	63	109	—	—	—	—	—	—
1988–89	ERC Westfalen Dortmund	GER-2	32	34	41	75	30	—	—	—	—	—
1989–90	HC Caen	FRA	11	5	4	9	18	—	—	—	—	—
AHL totals			169	60	87	147	81	5	4	0	4	0
NHL totals			59	3	25	28	11	—	—	—	—	—
