= Dave Burrows =

Canadian ice hockey player

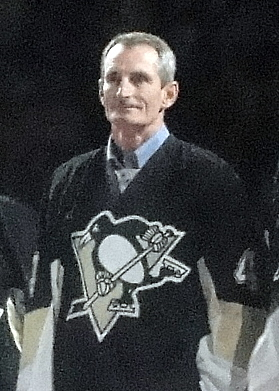
- Burrows in 2010
- Born: January 11, 1949 (age 77) Toronto, Ontario, Canada
- Height: 6 ft 1 in (185 cm)
- Weight: 190 lb (86 kg; 13 st 8 lb)
- Position: Defence
- Shot: Left
- Played for: Pittsburgh Penguins; Toronto Maple Leafs
- Playing career: 1969–1981

David James Burrows (born January 11, 1949) is a Canadian retired professional hockey player. He played in the National Hockey League with the Pittsburgh Penguins and Toronto Maple Leafs.

== Career ==
Burrows was born in Toronto, Ontario. Burrows learned to skate at the Pine Point Outdoor Arena in nearby Etobicoke. He won his first Provincial Championship with the Bantam Newmarket Optimists in 1963. As a teenager Burrows was selected the Most Valuable Defenseman and a First Team All-Star with the Dixie Beehives of the Metro Jr. B League.

Originally the property of the Chicago Blackhawks organization, Burrows played his junior hockey with the Ontario Hockey Association's St. Catharines Black Hawks before turning pro with the Central Hockey League's Dallas Black Hawks in 1969. The defenseman would ultimately never play a game in Chicago, being claimed by the Pittsburgh Penguins in the NHL's intra-league draft in June 1971.

Burrows' hero while growing up was Tim Horton. Burrows had the opportunity to play as the defence partner of his idol for one year, when Horton joined the Penguins for the 1971–72 season. Burrows credits Horton and Red Kelly, his coach that season, for helping him become successful at the NHL level. Burrows was selected as the Penguins "rookie of the year" for 1971-72. In his third season, he was chosen as the Penguins' team MVP.

In 1976, Burrows was selected to represent Canada in the Canada Cup Tournament. Chosen as a defensive replacement for future Hockey Hall of Fame member Bobby Orr, Burrows did not play in the tournament as Orr earned MVP honours.

A two-time all-star as a Penguin, Burrows was traded to Toronto for Randy Carlyle and George Ferguson in the spring of 1978. After two and a half seasons playing in his hometown (including another All-Star appearance in 1980), the defenceman was traded back to Pittsburgh along with Paul Gardner in exchange for Kim Davis and Paul Marshall early in the 1980-81 season.

Burrows is a member of the Penguins "all-time team", a list of the 15 greatest players in Penguins history as chosen by Trib Total Media. He is third all-time in games played among Penguins defensemen (573).

== Personal life ==
Burrows' grandson Sully Burrows is a country music singer and songwriter.

== Awards and achievements ==
- Played in NHL All-Star Game (1974, 1976, 1980)
- Represented Canada in the 1976 Canada Cup Tournament

== Career statistics ==
=== Regular season and playoffs ===
			Regular season					Playoffs
Season	Team	League	GP	G	A	Pts	PIM	GP	G	A	Pts	PIM
1967–68	Dixie Beehives	OPJHL	—	—	—	—	—	—	—	—	—	—
1967–68	St. Catharines Black Hawks	OHA	9	0	3	3	4	5	0	0	0	0
1968–69	St. Catharines Black Hawks	OHA-Jr.	54	3	16	19	36	18	1	4	5	12
1969–70	Dallas Black Hawks	CHL	69	4	9	13	45	—	—	—	—	—
1969–70	Portland Buckaroos	WHL	—	—	—	—	—	11	1	2	3	6
1970–71	Dallas Black Hawks	CHL	67	1	11	12	49	10	0	2	2	4
1971–72	Pittsburgh Penguins	NHL	77	2	10	12	48	4	0	0	0	4
1972–73	Pittsburgh Penguins	NHL	78	3	24	27	42	—	—	—	—	—
1973–74	Pittsburgh Penguins	NHL	71	3	14	17	30	—	—	—	—	—
1974–75	Pittsburgh Penguins	NHL	78	2	15	17	49	9	1	1	2	12
1975–76	Pittsburgh Penguins	NHL	80	7	22	29	51	3	0	0	0	0
1976–77	Pittsburgh Penguins	NHL	69	3	6	9	29	3	0	2	2	0
1977–78	Pittsburgh Penguins	NHL	67	4	15	19	24	—	—	—	—	—
1978–79	Toronto Maple Leafs	NHL	65	2	11	13	28	6	0	1	1	7
1979–80	Toronto Maple Leafs	NHL	80	3	16	19	42	3	0	1	1	2
1980–81	Toronto Maple Leafs	NHL	6	0	0	0	2	—	—	—	—	—
1980–81	Pittsburgh Penguins	NHL	53	0	2	2	28	1	0	0	0	0
NHL totals			724	29	135	164	373	29	1	5	6	25

== Transactions ==
- On June 8, 1971 the Chicago Blackhawks lost Dave Burrows to the Pittsburgh Penguins in an intra-league draft.
- On September 8, 1971 the Pittsburgh Penguins resigned Dave Burrows.
- On June 13, 1978 the Pittsburgh Penguins traded Dave Burrows and a 1978 sixth-round pick (#92-Mel Hewitt) to the Toronto Maple Leafs in exchange for Randy Carlyle and George Ferguson.
- On November 18, 1980 the Toronto Maple Leafs traded Dave Burrows and Paul Gardner to the Pittsburgh Penguins in exchange for Paul Marshall and Kim Davis.
