= Ron Sedlbauer =

Canadian ice hockey player

- Born: October 22, 1954 (age 70); Burlington, Ontario, Canada
- Height: 6 ft 3 in (191 cm)
- Weight: 185 lb (84 kg; 13 st 3 lb)
- Position: Left wing
- Shot: Left
- Played for: Vancouver Canucks; Chicago Blackhawks; Toronto Maple Leafs
- NHL draft: 23rd overall, 1974; Vancouver Canucks
- WHA draft: 57th overall, 1974; Toronto Toros
- Playing career: 1974–1981

Ronald Andrew Sedlbauer (born October 22, 1954) is a former professional ice hockey left winger who played seven seasons in the National Hockey League.

== Hockey career ==
Sedlbauer was drafted 23rd overall by the Vancouver Canucks in the 1974 NHL amateur draft. He played 430 career NHL games, scoring 143 goals and 86 assists for 229 points. He also shares the modern-day record, along with Rick Nash, for fewest assists in a 40+ goal season. Sedlbauer scored 40 goals in the 1978–79 season, but only registered 16 assists. He held the record for 26 seasons until Nash tied it in the 2003–04 NHL season by scoring 41 goals and only 16 assists. After appearing in 32 games with ten goals and four assists to start the 1979–80 campaign, he was dealt from the Canucks to the Chicago Black Hawks for Dave Logan and Harold Phillipoff on December 21. His contract was purchased from the Black Hawks by the Toronto Maple Leafs on February 18, 1981. The transaction was the Maple Leafs' attempt to bolster its winger positions after injuries to Dan Maloney and René Robert.

== Life ==
Ron attended Burlington Central High School from 1968 to 1972. He was a member of the Halton junior football championship team in 1971. Ron also qualified for the O.F.S.A.A. track and field championships in the shot put event. Ron was thrilled to receive an honorary athletic letter from the school the year he graduated.

Ron spent most of his youth playing hockey for the City of Burlington. He was drafted by the Hamilton Red Wings Jr. A hockey club while a member of the Burlington midget city rep team. After two and a half years with Hamilton, Ron was traded to the Kitchener Rangers, where he scored his only Jr. A hat trick; during his last game in junior; on his last ever shift.

Ron now lives in Burlington with his wife Sue, and his son, Brendon. He is currently the vice-president of Cougar Shoes Inc., and president of the Burlington Cougars Jr. A hockey club.

== Career statistics ==
			Regular season					Playoffs
Season	Team	League	GP	G	A	Pts	PIM	GP	G	A	Pts	PIM
1971–72	Hamilton Red Wings	OHA-Jr.	61	18	8	26	43	—	—	—	—	—
1972–73	Hamilton Red Wings	OHA-Jr.	58	13	20	33	92	—	—	—	—	—
1973–74	Kitchener Rangers	OHA-Jr.	54	29	25	54	83	—	—	—	—	—
1974–75	Vancouver Canucks	NHL	26	3	4	7	17	5	0	0	0	10
1974–75	Seattle Totems	CHL	53	23	13	36	100	—	—	—	—	—
1975–76	Vancouver Canucks	NHL	56	19	13	32	66	2	0	0	0	0
1975–76	Tulsa Oilers	CHL	4	1	1	2	9	—	—	—	—	—
1976–77	Vancouver Canucks	NHL	70	18	20	38	29	—	—	—	—	—
1976–77	Tulsa Oilers	CHL	8	4	6	10	28	—	—	—	—	—
1977–78	Vancouver Canucks	NHL	62	18	12	30	25	—	—	—	—	—
1977–78	Tulsa Oilers	CHL	5	6	1	7	2	—	—	—	—	—
1978–79	Vancouver Canucks	NHL	79	40	16	56	26	3	0	1	1	9
1979–80	Vancouver Canucks	NHL	32	10	4	14	7	—	—	—	—	—
1979–80	Chicago Black Hawks	NHL	45	13	10	23	14	7	1	1	2	6
1980–81	Chicago Black Hawks	NHL	39	12	3	15	12	—	—	—	—	—
1980–81	Toronto Maple Leafs	NHL	21	10	4	14	14	2	0	1	1	2
1981–82	Cincinnati Tigers	CHL	73	27	20	47	49	4	3	0	3	0
NHL totals			430	143	86	229	210	19	1	3	4	27

== Highlights ==
- 1971 Drafted by Hamilton Red Wings Jr. A Hockey Club
- 1974 OHA (Jr. A) Regular Season Champions – Kitchener Rangers
- 1974 Drafted by Vancouver Canucks as their 1st pick, and 23rd overall in the NHL
- 1975 Scored 1st NHL goal versus Toronto Maple Leafs.
- 1974-75 Smythe Division Champions with Vancouver Canucks
- 1979 Set a new Vancouver Canuck single season goal scoring record of 40 goals.
- 1979 Won the Cyrus McLean Trophy as Vancouver Canucks leading scorer
- 1979 Scored 100th N.H.L. goal versus Toronto Maple Leafs
- 1979-80 Smythe Division Champions with Chicago Blackhawks
- 2004 Honoured as one of Hamilton's Hometown hockey heroes
- 2005 Selected to the Burlington Central High School Athletic Hall of Fame
