= Paul Marshall (ice hockey, born 1960) =

Canadian ice hockey player

- Born: September 7, 1960 (age 65) Toronto, Ontario, Canada
- Height: 6 ft 2 in (188 cm)
- Weight: 180 lb (82 kg; 12 st 12 lb)
- Position: Left wing
- Shot: Left
- Played for: Pittsburgh Penguins; Toronto Maple Leafs; Hartford Whalers
- NHL draft: 31st overall, 1979; Pittsburgh Penguins
- Playing career: 1979–1983

Paul Marshall (born September 7, 1960) is a Canadian former professional ice hockey left winger. He played 95 games in the National Hockey League between 1979 and 1983 with the Pittsburgh Penguins, Toronto Maple Leafs, and Hartford Whalers.

== Playing career ==
Born in Toronto, Ontario, Marshall was drafted 31st overall by the Pittsburgh Penguins in the 1979 NHL entry draft and spent two seasons with the team. His rookie season in the 1979-80 NHL season saw Marshall play 46 regular-season games for Pittsburgh, scoring 9 goals and 12 assists for 21 points. The next season, Marshall played 13 games for Pittsburgh, scoring three goals. In November 1980 he was traded to the Toronto Maple Leafs, where he played another 13 games, scoring two assists. He spent more of the season, though, in the American Hockey League with a highly productive spell with the New Brunswick Hawks, where in 47 games he scored 25 goals and 28 assists for 53 points. He would play another 10 games for the Leafs in the 1981-82 NHL season, scoring two goals and two assists. He spent much of the season in the Central Hockey League for the Cincinnati Tigers, scoring 23 goals and 29 assists for 52 points in 54 games. Marshall was traded to the Hartford Whalers in October 1982 and spent most of the season in the AHL for the Binghamton Whalers while managing to play 13 more games in the NHL for the Whalers, scoring a goal and two assists. He would retire from hockey after the season.

In total, Marshall played 95 regular-season games, scoring 15 goals and 18 assists for 33 points, accumulating 17 penalty minutes. He also played in one playoff game during his rookie year with the Penguins.

== Career statistics ==
=== Regular season and playoffs ===
| | | | Regular season | | | | | Playoffs |
| Season | Team | League | GP | G | A | Pts | PIM | GP | G | A | Pts | PIM |
|---|---|---|---|---|---|---|---|---|---|---|---|---|
| 1977–78 | Hamilton Fincups | OMJHL | 58 | 36 | 34 | 70 | 54 | — | — | — | — | — |
| 1978–79 | Brantford Alexanders | OMJHL | 67 | 42 | 72 | 114 | 59 | — | — | — | — | — |
| 1979–80 | Brantford Alexanders | OMJHL | 4 | 2 | 2 | 4 | 0 | — | — | — | — | — |
| 1979–80 | Pittsburgh Penguins | NHL | 46 | 9 | 12 | 21 | 9 | 1 | 0 | 0 | 0 | 0 |
| 1980–81 | Binghamton Whalers | AHL | 2 | 2 | 1 | 3 | 0 | — | — | — | — | — |
| 1980–81 | New Brunswick Hawks | AHL | 47 | 25 | 28 | 53 | 41 | 13 | 6 | 7 | 13 | 10 |
| 1980–81 | Pittsburgh Penguins | NHL | 13 | 3 | 0 | 3 | 4 | — | — | — | — | — |
| 1980–81 | Toronto Maple Leafs | NHL | 13 | 0 | 2 | 2 | 2 | — | — | — | — | — |
| 1981–82 | Toronto Maple Leafs | NHL | 10 | 2 | 2 | 4 | 2 | — | — | — | — | — |
| 1981–82 | Cincinnati Tigers | CHL | 54 | 23 | 29 | 52 | 61 | 4 | 2 | 1 | 3 | 0 |
| 1982–83 | Binghamton Whalers | AHL | 61 | 25 | 26 | 51 | 21 | 5 | 3 | 2 | 5 | 0 |
| 1982–83 | Hartford Whalers | NHL | 13 | 1 | 2 | 3 | 0 | — | — | — | — | — |
| NHL totals | | | 95 | 15 | 18 | 33 | 17 | 1 | 0 | 0 | 0 | 0 |

== Transactions ==
- November 18, 1980 – Traded to the Toronto Maple Leafs by the Pittsburgh Penguins with Kim Davis for Dave Burrows and Paul Gardner.
- October 5, 1982 – Traded to the Hartford Whalers by the Toronto Maple Leafs for Hartford's 10th round choice (Greg Rolston) in 1983 NHL entry draft.
