= Vítězslav Ďuriš =

Czech ice hockey player

- Born: 5 January 1954 (age 71); Karviná, Czechoslovakia
- Height: 6 ft 1 in (185 cm)
- Weight: 194 lb (88 kg; 13 st 12 lb)
- Position: Defence
- Shot: Left
- Played for: TJ Plzeň; ASD Dukla Jihlava; Toronto Maple Leafs; ECD Iserlohn; EV Landshut; EHC Freiburg
- National team: Czechoslovakia
- NHL draft: Undrafted
- Playing career: 1977–1991

Vítězslav "Slava" Ďuriš (born 5 January 1954) is a Czech former professional ice hockey defenceman who represented Czechoslovakia. He began his career with TJ Plzeň in the Czechoslovak First Ice Hockey League, where he played from 1975 to 1980. He then played 89 games in the National Hockey League with the Toronto Maple Leafs during the 1980–81 and 1982–83 seasons. Ďuriš returned to Europe and played in the German Eishockey-Bundesliga from 1983 until 1991. Internationally Ďuriš played for the Czechoslovakia national team at the 1979 World Championships, winning a silver medal, and the 1980 Winter Olympics.

== Career statistics ==
=== Regular season and playoffs ===
| | | | Regular season | | | | | Playoffs |
| Season | Team | League | GP | G | A | Pts | PIM | GP | G | A | Pts | PIM |
|---|---|---|---|---|---|---|---|---|---|---|---|---|
| 1974–75 | TJ Plzeň U18 | CSSR U18 | — | — | — | — | — | — | — | — | — | — |
| 1975–76 | TJ Plzeň | CSSR | — | — | — | — | — | — | — | — | — | — |
| 1976–77 | TJ Plzeň | CSSR | — | — | — | — | — | — | — | — | — | — |
| 1977–78 | ASD Dukla Jihlava | CSSR | — | — | — | — | — | — | — | — | — | — |
| 1977–78 | Czechoslovakia | WHA | 8 | 5 | 0 | 5 | 12 | — | — | — | — | — |
| 1978–79 | ASD Dukla Jihlava | CSSR | 38 | 3 | 9 | 12 | 24 | — | — | — | — | — |
| 1979–80 | TJ Plzeň | CSSR | 23 | 4 | 3 | 7 | 40 | — | — | — | — | — |
| 1980–81 | Toronto Maple Leafs | NHL | 57 | 1 | 12 | 13 | 50 | 3 | 0 | 1 | 1 | 2 |
| 1981–82 | Cincinnati Tigers | CHL | 66 | 14 | 41 | 55 | 57 | — | — | — | — | — |
| 1982–83 | Toronto Maple Leafs | NHL | 32 | 2 | 8 | 10 | 12 | — | — | — | — | — |
| 1983–84 | ECD Iserlohn | GER | — | — | — | — | — | — | — | — | — | — |
| 1984–85 | ECD Iserlohn | GER | 35 | 12 | 19 | 31 | 44 | 3 | 1 | 1 | 2 | 2 |
| 1986–87 | ECD Iserlohn | GER | 36 | 12 | 25 | 37 | 33 | 3 | 3 | 2 | 5 | 4 |
| 1987–88 | ECD Iserlohn | GER | 22 | 3 | 13 | 16 | 21 | — | — | — | — | — |
| 1987–88 | EV Landshut | GER | 11 | 0 | 4 | 4 | 12 | 4 | 1 | 1 | 2 | 4 |
| 1988–89 | EV Landshut | GER | 22 | 0 | 2 | 2 | 12 | — | — | — | — | — |
| 1988–89 | EHC Freiburg | GER | 10 | 2 | 4 | 6 | 23 | — | — | — | — | — |
| 1989–90 | EHC Freiburg | GER | 28 | 4 | 8 | 12 | 17 | — | — | — | — | — |
| 1990–91 | EHC Freiburg | GER | — | — | — | — | — | — | — | — | — | — |
| NHL totals | | | 89 | 3 | 20 | 23 | 62 | 3 | 0 | 1 | 1 | 2 |

=== International ===
Medal record

Representing Czechoslovakia

World Championships
| Silver medal – second place | 1979 Soviet Union | |

| Year | Team | Event | GP | G | A | Pts | PIM |
|---|---|---|---|---|---|---|---|
| 1979 | Czechoslovakia | WC | 8 | 1 | 1 | 2 | 8 |
| 1980 | Czechoslovakia | OLY | 6 | 0 | 1 | 1 | 2 |
| Senior totals | | | 14 | 1 | 2 | 3 | 10 |
