= Colin Chisholm (ice hockey) =

Canadian ice hockey player

- Born: February 25, 1963 (age 63) Edmonton, Alberta, Canada
- Height: 6 ft 2 in (188 cm)
- Weight: 190 lb (86 kg; 13 st 8 lb)
- Position: Defence
- Shot: Right
- Played for: Minnesota North Stars
- NHL draft: 60th overall, 1981; Buffalo Sabres
- Playing career: 1986–1988

Colin Chisholm (born February 25, 1963) is a Canadian former professional ice hockey defenceman. He was drafted in the third round, 60th overall, by the Buffalo Sabres in the 1981 NHL entry draft. He played one game in the National Hockey League with the Minnesota North Stars in the 1986–87 season, going scoreless. However he was unable to continue playing hockey due to a medical condition.

== Career statistics ==
=== Regular season and playoffs ===
			Regular season					Playoffs
Season	Team	League	GP	G	A	Pts	PIM	GP	G	A	Pts	PIM
1979–80	Calgary Buffaloes U18	AEHL	—	—	—	—	—	—	—	—	—	—
1980–81	Calgary Wranglers	WHL	70	0	18	18	156	22	2	3	5	34
1981–82	Calgary Wranglers	WHL	70	1	15	16	150	9	0	3	3	24
1982–83	University of Alberta	CIAU	28	2	8	10	65	11	1	1	2	27
1983–84	University of Alberta	CIAU	16	1	8	9	45	10	—	—	—	70
1984–85	University of Alberta	CIAU	24	2	23	25	100	16	0	0	0	24
1985–86	University of Alberta	CIAU	25	3	12	15	69	—	—	—	—	—
1986–87	Springfield Indians	AHL	75	1	11	12	141	—	—	—	—	—
1986–87	Minnesota North Stars	NHL	1	0	0	0	0	—	—	—	—	—
1987–88	Kalamazoo Wings	IHL	44	1	3	4	59	—	—	—	—	—
AHL totals			75	1	11	12	141	—	—	—	—	—
IHL totals			44	1	3	4	59	—	—	—	—	—
NHL totals			1	0	0	0	0	—	—	—	—	—

== See also ==
- List of players who played only one game in the NHL
