= Tom Hirsch =

American ice hockey player (born 1963)

- Born: January 27, 1963 (age 63) Minneapolis, Minnesota, United States
- Height: 6 ft 4 in (193 cm)
- Weight: 210 lb (95 kg; 15 st 0 lb)
- Position: Defense
- Shot: Right
- Played for: Minnesota North Stars
- National team: United States
- NHL draft: 33rd overall, 1981; Minnesota North Stars
- Playing career: 1984–1988

Thomas William Hirsch (born January 27, 1963) is an American retired professional ice hockey player, who played 31 games in the National Hockey League between 1984 and 1988 for the Minnesota North Stars. He was also a member of the American national team at the 1984 Winter Olympics, 1984 Canada Cup and 1982 World Championships. His career was ended by persistent shoulder injury problems. Tom's daughter Casey played forward and was the captain of the Maple Grove Senior High School Girls Hockey Team her senior year. She also played for the Syracuse University Orange, Women's Hockey Team starting fall of 2011.

== Career statistics ==
=== Regular season and playoffs ===
			Regular season					Playoffs
Season	Team	League	GP	G	A	Pts	PIM	GP	G	A	Pts	PIM
1978–79	Camden High School (as Patrick Henry High School)	HS-MN	—	—	—	—	—	—	—	—	—	—
1979–80	Camden High School	HS-MN	—	—	—	—	—	—	—	—	—	—
1980–81	Camden High School	HS-MN	23	42	35	77	—	—	—	—	—	—
1981–82	University of Minnesota	WCHA	36	7	16	23	53	—	—	—	—	—
1982–83	University of Minnesota	WCHA	37	8	23	31	70	—	—	—	—	—
1983–84	United States National Team	Intl	56	8	25	33	72	—	—	—	—	—
1983–84	Minnesota North Stars	NHL	15	1	3	4	20	12	0	0	0	6
1984–85	Minnesota North Stars	NHL	15	0	4	4	10	—	—	—	—	—
1984–85	Springfield Indians	AHL	19	4	5	9	2	—	—	—	—	—
1987–88	Minnesota North Stars	NHL	1	0	0	0	0	—	—	—	—	—
NHL totals			31	1	7	8	30	12	0	0	0	6

=== International ===
Year	Team	Event	GP	G	A	Pts	PIM
1982	United States	WC	6	1	1	2	0
1984	United States	OLY	6	1	0	1	10
1984	United States	CC	5	0	0	0	0
Senior totals			17	2	1	3	10
