= Mark Kirton =

Canadian ice hockey player (1958–2025)

- Born: February 3, 1958 Regina, Saskatchewan, Canada
- Died: August 17, 2025 (aged 67) Oakville, Ontario, Canada
- Height: 5 ft 10 in (178 cm)
- Weight: 170 lb (77 kg; 12 st 2 lb)
- Position: Centre
- Shot: Left
- Played for: Toronto Maple Leafs; Detroit Red Wings; Vancouver Canucks
- NHL draft: 48th overall, 1978; Toronto Maple Leafs
- Playing career: 1978–1989

Mark Robert Kirton (February 3, 1958 – August 17, 2025) was a Canadian professional ice hockey player who played 266 games in the National Hockey League.

== Playing career ==
Born in Regina, Kirton grew up in the Toronto suburb of Scarborough. He played minor hockey for the Wexford Warriors, then in the Ontario Major Junior Hockey League with coach Roger Neilson and the Peterborough Petes, from 1975-76 (with Neilson) to 1977-78 under Gary Green. During his final season, he along with other future NHLers including fellow Scarberian Bill Gardiner, Stouffville's Keith Acton, and goalie Ken Ellacott won the J. Ross Robertson Cup for the OMJHL title over the Hamilton Fincups. They lost in the 1978 Memorial Cup to Kirton's future NHL teammates John Ogrodnick (Detroit) and Stan Smyl (Vancouver) of the defending champion New Westminster Bruins, whom they defeated twice in the round-robin. Kirton was named the tournament's All-Star centre, and won the George Parsons Trophy for most sportsmanlike play.

A month following the Memorial Cup loss, Kirton was drafted by the Toronto Maple Leafs as the 48th pick, in the third round of the 1978 NHL Amateur Draft. He played for the Maple Leafs, Detroit Red Wings, and Vancouver Canucks. He also spent several years in the American Hockey League playing for the minor league affiliates of his NHL teams.

== Personal life ==
Following his retirement in 1989, Kirton worked as a realtor in Oakville, Ontario.

=== Illness and death ===
In 2018, Kirton was diagnosed with amyotrophic lateral sclerosis (ALS), which eventually left him unable to walk. After Kirton's former teammate and mentor Börje Salming was diagnosed with ALS in August 2022, Kirton provided support and guidance to Salming, after being reconnected through Darryl Sittler. Kirton died at his home in Oakville, on August 17, 2025, at the age of 67.

== Career statistics ==
=== Regular season and playoffs ===
			Regular season					Playoffs
Season	Team	League	GP	G	A	Pts	PIM	GP	G	A	Pts	PIM
1974–75	Wexford Warriors	MJBHL	38	18	29	47	26	—	—	—	—	—
1975–76	Peterborough Petes	OMJHL	65	22	38	60	10	—	—	—	—	—
1976–77	Peterborough Petes	OMJHL	48	18	24	42	41	4	6	1	7	0
1977–78	Peterborough Petes	OMJHL	68	27	44	71	29	21	12	14	26	14
1978–79	New Brunswick Hawks	AHL	80	20	30	50	14	5	0	0	0	2
1979–80	Toronto Maple Leafs	NHL	2	1	0	1	2	—	—	—	—	—
1979–80	New Brunswick Hawks	AHL	61	19	42	61	33	17	7	11	18	16
1980–81	Toronto Maple Leafs	NHL	11	0	0	0	0	—	—	—	—	—
1980–81	Detroit Red Wings	NHL	50	18	13	31	24	—	—	—	—	—
1981–82	Detroit Red Wings	NHL	74	14	28	42	62	—	—	—	—	—
1982–83	Detroit Red Wings	NHL	10	1	1	2	6	—	—	—	—	—
1982–83	Vancouver Canucks	NHL	31	4	6	10	4	4	1	2	3	7
1983–84	Vancouver Canucks	NHL	26	2	3	5	2	—	—	—	—	—
1983–84	Fredericton Express	AHL	35	8	10	18	8	7	2	3	5	6
1984–85	Vancouver Canucks	NHL	62	17	5	22	21	—	—	—	—	—
1984–85	Fredericton Express	AHL	15	5	9	14	18	—	—	—	—	—
1985–86	Fredericton Express	AHL	77	23	36	59	33	6	2	2	4	4
1986–87	Fredericton Express	AHL	80	27	37	64	20	—	—	—	—	—
1987–88	Newmarket Saints	AHL	73	17	30	47	42	—	—	—	—	—
1988–89	Newmarket Saints	AHL	37	4	8	12	18	—	—	—	—	—
AHL totals			458	123	202	325	186	35	11	16	27	28
NHL totals			266	57	56	113	121	4	1	2	3	7
