= 1981 NHL entry draft =

1981 ice hockey draft

General information
- Date: June 10, 1981
- Location: Montreal Forum; Montreal, Quebec, Canada

Overview
- 211 total selections in 11 rounds
- First selection: (Canada) Dale Hawerchuk (Winnipeg Jets)
- Hall of Famers: 6: C Dale Hawerchuk; C Ron Francis; G Grant Fuhr; D Al MacInnis; D Chris Chelios; G Mike Vernon

The 1981 NHL entry draft was the 19th draft for the National Hockey League. It was held at the Montreal Forum in Montreal. The NHL teams selected 211 players eligible for entry into professional ranks, in the reverse order of the 1980–81 NHL season and playoff standings. This is the list of those players selected.

The last active player in the NHL from this draft class was Chris Chelios, who retired after the 2009–10 season.

== Selections by round ==
Below are listed the selections in the 1981 NHL entry draft. Club teams are located in North America unless otherwise noted.

= NHL All-Star team ·	= NHL All-Star (Note: Players are identified as an All-Star if they were selected for the All-Star game at any time in their career.) ·	= NHL All-Star and NHL All-Star team ·	= Hall of Famers

=== Round one ===
#	Player	Nationality	NHL team	College/junior/club team
1	Dale Hawerchuk (C)	Canada	Winnipeg Jets	Cornwall Royals (QMJHL)
2	Doug Smith (C)	Canada	Los Angeles Kings (from Detroit)	Ottawa 67's (OMJHL)
3	Bobby Carpenter (C)	United States	Washington Capitals (from Colorado)	St. John's School (USHS-MA)
4	Ron Francis (C)	Canada	Hartford Whalers	Sault Ste. Marie Greyhounds (OMJHL)
5	Joe Cirella (D)	Canada	Colorado Rockies (from Washington)	Oshawa Generals (OMJHL)
6	Jim Benning (D)	Canada	Toronto Maple Leafs	Portland Winter Hawks (WHL)
7	Mark Hunter (RW)	Canada	Montreal Canadiens (from Pittsburgh)	Brantford Alexanders (OMJHL)
8	Grant Fuhr (G)	Canada	Edmonton Oilers	Victoria Cougars (WHL)
9	James Patrick (D)	Canada	New York Rangers	Prince Albert Raiders (SJHL)
10	Garth Butcher (D)	Canada	Vancouver Canucks	Regina Pats (WHL)
11	Randy Moller (D)	Canada	Quebec Nordiques	Lethbridge Broncos (WHL)
12	Tony Tanti (RW)	Canada	Chicago Black Hawks	Oshawa Generals (OMJHL)
13	Ron Meighan (D)	Canada	Minnesota North Stars	Niagara Falls Flyers (OMJHL)
14	Normand Leveille (LW)	Canada	Boston Bruins	Chicoutimi Saguenéens (QMJHL)
15	Al MacInnis (D)	Canada	Calgary Flames	Kitchener Rangers (OMJHL)
16	Steve Smith (D)	Canada	Philadelphia Flyers	Sault Ste. Marie Greyhounds (OMJHL)
17	Jiri Dudacek (RW)	Czechoslovakia	Buffalo Sabres	HC Kladno (Czechoslovakia)
18	Gilbert Delorme (D)	Canada	Montreal Canadiens (from Los Angeles)	Chicoutimi Saguenéens (QMJHL)
19	Jan Ingman (LW)	Sweden	Montreal Canadiens	Färjestad BK (Sweden)
20	Marty Ruff (D)	Canada	St. Louis Blues	Lethbridge Broncos (WHL)
21	Paul Boutilier (D)	Canada	New York Islanders	Sherbrooke Castors (QMJHL)
^{Reference: "1981 NHL Entry Draft hockeydraftcentral.com". Archived from the original on January 24, 2009.}

==== Notes (Round 1) ====
1.* The Detroit Red Wings' first round pick went to the Los Angeles Kings as the result of a trade on August 22, 1979 that sent the right to Dale McCourt to the Detroit Red Wings in exchange for Andre St. Laurent, 1st round pick in 1980 NHL entry draft and Kings' option of a 2nd round pick in 1980 NHL entry draft or 1st round pick in 1981 NHL entry draft. Kings optioned for this pick.

2.* The Colorado Rockies' first round pick went to the Washington Capitals as the result of a trade on June 10, 1981 that sent the 5th overall pick and 26th overall pick to the Colorado Rockies in exchange for the 45th overall pick and this pick.

3.* The Washington Capitals' first round pick went to the Colorado Rockies as the result of a trade on June 10, 1981 that sent the 3rd overall pick and the 45th overall pick to the Washington Capitals in exchange for 26th overall pick and this pick.

4.* The Pittsburgh Penguins' first round pick went to the Montreal Canadiens as the result of a trade on October 18, 1978 that sent Rod Schutt to the Pittsburgh Penguins in exchange for this pick.

5.* The Los Angeles Kings' first round pick went to the Montreal Canadiens as the result of a trade on October 5, 1978 that sent Murray Wilson and the 1st round pick in 1979 to the Los Angeles Kings in exchange for this pick.

=== Round two ===
#	Player	Nationality	NHL team	College/junior/club team
22	Scott Arniel (C)	Canada	Winnipeg Jets	Cornwall Royals (QMJHL)
23	Claude Loiselle (C)	Canada	Detroit Red Wings	Windsor Spitfires (OMJHL)
24	Gary Yaremchuk (C)	Canada	Toronto Maple Leafs (from Colorado)	Portland Winter Hawks (WHL)
25	Kevin Griffin (LW)	Canada	Chicago Black Hawks (from Hartford)	Portland Winter Hawks (WHL)
26	Rich Chernomaz (RW)	Canada	Colorado Rockies (from Washington)	Victoria Cougars (WHL)
27	Dave Donnelly (C)	Canada	Minnesota North Stars (from Toronto)	St. Albert Saints (AJHL)
28	Steve Gatzos (RW)	Canada	Pittsburgh Penguins	Sault Ste. Marie Greyhounds (OMJHL)
29	Todd Strueby (LW)	Canada	Edmonton Oilers	Regina Pats (WHL)
30	Jan Erixon (LW)	Sweden	New York Rangers	Skellefteå AIK (Sweden)
31	Mike Sands (G)	Canada	Minnesota North Stars (from Vancouver)	Sudbury Wolves (OMJHL)
32	Lars Eriksson (G)	Sweden	Montreal Canadiens (from Quebec)	Brynäs IF (Sweden)
33	Tom Hirsch (D)	United States	Minnesota North Stars (from Chicago)	Patrick Henry High School (USHS-MN)
34	Dave Preuss (RW)	United States	Minnesota North Stars	St. Thomas Academy (USHS-MN)
35	Luc Dufour (LW)	Canada	Boston Bruins	Chicoutimi Saguenéens (QMJHL)
36	Hakan Nordin (D)	Sweden	St. Louis Blues (from Calgary)	Färjestad BK (Sweden)
37	Rich Costello (C)	United States	Philadelphia Flyers	Nantick High School (USHS-MA)
38	Hannu Virta (D)	Finland	Buffalo Sabres	TPS (Finland)
39	Dean Kennedy (D)	Canada	Los Angeles Kings	Brandon Wheat Kings (WHL)
40	Chris Chelios (D)	United States	Montreal Canadiens	Moose Jaw Canucks (SJHL)
41	Jali Wahlsten (C)	Finland	Minnesota North Stars (from St. Louis)	TPS (Finland)
42	Gord Dineen (D)	Canada	New York Islanders	Sault Ste. Marie Greyhounds (OMJHL)
^{Reference: "1981 NHL Entry Draft hockeydraftcentral.com". Archived from the original on February 11, 2009.}

==== Notes (Round 2) ====
1.* The Colorado Rockies' second round pick went to the Toronto Maple Leafs as the result of a trade on October 19, 1978 that sent Jack Valiquette to the Colorado Rockies in exchange for this pick.

2.* The Hartford Whalers' second round pick went to the Chicago Black Hawks as the result of a trade on June 19, 1980 that sent Mike Veisor to the Hartford Whalers in exchange for this pick.

3.* The Washington Capitals' second round pick went to the Colorado Rockies as the result of a trade on June 10, 1981 that sent the 3rd overall pick and the 45th overall pick to the Washington Capitals in exchange for 5th overall pick and this pick.

4.* The Toronto Maple Leafs' second round pick went to the Minnesota North Stars as the result of a trade on March 10, 1981 that sent Ron Zanussi and the 55th overall pick to the Toronto Maple Leafs in exchange for this pick.

5.* The Vancouver Canucks' second round pick went to the Minnesota North Stars as the result of a trade on December 10, 1979 that sent Olov Brasar to the Vancouver Canucks in exchange for this pick.

6.* The Quebec Nordiques' second round pick went to the Montreal Canadiens as the result of a trade on June 9, 1979 that Quebec Nordiques promise to take Dan Geoffrion and/or Alain Cote, rather than Marc Tardif and/or Richard David in 1979 NHL expansion draft in exchange for the third round pick in 1980 and this pick.

7.* The Chicago Black Hawks' second round pick went to the Minnesota North Stars as the result of a trade on December 29, 1980 that sent Glen Sharpley to the Chicago Black Hawks in exchange for Ken Solheim and this pick.

8.* The Calgary Flames' second round pick went to the St. Louis Blues as the result of a trade on October 10, 1979 that sent Garry Unger to the Atlanta Flames in exchange for Ed Kea, Don Laurence, and this pick. The Atlanta franchise relocated to Calgary for the 1980–81 NHL season.

9.* The St. Louis Blues' second round pick went to the Minnesota North Stars as the result of a trade on June 15, 1978 that sent Bob Stewart and future considerations (Harvey Bennett) to the St. Louis Blues in exchange for this pick.

=== Round three ===
#	Player	Nationality	NHL team	College/junior/club team
43	Jyrki Seppa (D)	Finland	Winnipeg Jets	Ilves (Finland)
44	Corrado Micalef (G)	Canada	Detroit Red Wings	Sherbrooke Castors (QMJHL)
45	Eric Calder (D)	Canada	Washington Capitals (from Colorado)	Cornwall Royals (QMJHL)
46	Dieter Hegen (C)	West Germany	Montreal Canadiens (from Hartford)	EVS Kaufbeuren (West Germany)
47	Barry Tabobondung (LW)	Canada	Philadelphia Flyers (from Washington)	Oshawa Generals (OMJHL)
48	Uli Hiemer (D)	West Germany	Colorado Rockies (from Toronto)	EV Fussen (West Germany)
49	Tom Thornbury (D)	Canada	Pittsburgh Penguins	Niagara Falls Flyers (OMJHL)
50	Peter Sundstrom (LW)	Sweden	New York Rangers (from Edmonton)	IF Björklöven (Sweden)
51	Mark Morrison (C)	Canada	New York Rangers	Victoria Cougars (WHL)
52	Jean-Marc Lanthier (RW)	Canada	Vancouver Canucks	Sorel Eperviers (QMJHL)
53	Jean-Marc Gaulin (RW)	Canada	Quebec Nordiques	Sorel Eperviers (QMJHL)
54	Darrel Anholt (D)	Canada	Chicago Black Hawks	Calgary Wranglers (WHL)
55	Ernie Godden (C)	Canada	Toronto Maple Leafs (from Minnesota)	Windsor Spitfires (OMJHL)
56	Mike Vernon (G)	Canada	Calgary Flames (from Boston)	Calgary Wranglers (WHL)
57	Ron Handy (LW)	Canada	New York Islanders (from Calgary)	Sault Ste. Marie Greyhounds (OMJHL)
58	Ken Strong (LW)	Canada	Philadelphia Flyers	Peterborough Petes (OMJHL)
59	Jim Aldred (D)	Canada	Buffalo Sabres	Kingston Canadiens (OMJHL)
60	Colin Chisholm (D)	Canada	Buffalo Sabres (from Los Angeles)	Calgary Wranglers (WHL)
61	Paul MacDermid (RW)	Canada	Hartford Whalers (from Montreal)	Windsor Spitfires (OMJHL)
62	Gord Donnelly (D)	Canada	St. Louis Blues	Sherbrooke Castors (QMJHL)
63	Neal Coulter (RW)	Canada	New York Islanders	Toronto Marlboros (OMJHL)
^{Reference: "1981 NHL Entry Draft hockeydraftcentral.com". Archived from the original on February 11, 2009.}

==== Notes (Round 3) ====
1.* The Colorado Rockies' third round pick went to the Washington Capitals as the result of a trade on June 10, 1981 that sent the 5th overall pick and the 26th overall pick to the Colorado Rockies in exchange for 3rd overall pick and this pick.

2.* The Hartford Whalers' third round pick went to the Montreal Canadiens as the result of a trade on June 5, 1980 that sent Rick Meagher, the 61st overall pick, and the 103rd overall pick to the Hartford Whalers in exchange for the 88th overall pick and this pick.

3.* The Washington Capitals' third round pick went to the Philadelphia Flyers as the result of a trade on August 16, 1979 that sent Wayne Stephenson to the Washington Capitals in exchange for this pick.

4.* The Toronto Maple Leafs' third round pick went to the Colorado Rockies as the result of a trade on June 30, 1981 that sent Rene Robert to the Toronto Maple Leafs in exchange for this pick.

5.* The Edmonton Oilers' third round pick went to the New York Rangers as the result of a trade on March 11, 1980 that sent Don Murdoch to the Edmonton Oilers in exchange for Cam Connor and this pick.

6.* The Minnesota North Stars' third round pick went to the Toronto Maple Leafs as the result of a trade on March 10, 1981 that sent the 27th overall pick to the Minnesota North Stars in exchange for Ron Zanussi and this pick.

7.* The Boston Bruins' third round pick went to the Calgary Flames as the result of a trade on June 2, 1980 that sent Jim Craig to the Boston Bruins in exchange for the second round pick in 1980 and this pick.

8.* The Calgary Flames' third round pick went to the New York Islanders as the result of a trade on October 9, 1980 that sent Alex McKendry to the Calgary Flames in exchange for this pick.

9.* The Los Angeles Kings' third round pick went to the Buffalo Sabres as the result of a trade on March 10, 1981 that sent Rick Martin to the Los Angeles Kings in exchange for the first round pick in 1983 and this pick.

10.* The Montreal Canadiens' third round pick went to the Hartford Whalers as the result of a trade on June 5, 1980 that sent the 46th overall pick and the 88th overall pick to the Los Angeles Kings in exchange for Rick Meagher, the 103rd overall pick, and this pick.

=== Round four ===
#	Player	Nationality	NHL team	College/junior/club team
64	Kirk McCaskill (C)	Canada	Winnipeg Jets	University of Vermont (ECAC)
65	Dave Michayluk (RW)	Canada	Philadelphia Flyers (from Detroit)	Regina Pats (WHL)
66	Gus Greco (C)	Canada	Colorado Rockies	Windsor Spitfires (OMJHL)
67	Mike Hoffman (LW)	Canada	Hartford Whalers	Brantford Alexanders (OMJHL)
68	Tony Kellin (D)	United States	Washington Capitals	Grand Rapids High School (USHS-MN)
69	Terry Tait (LW)	Canada	Minnesota North Stars (from Toronto)	Sault Ste. Marie Greyhounds (OMJHL)
70	Norm Schmidt (D)	Canada	Pittsburgh Penguins	Oshawa Generals (OMJHL)
71	Paul Houck (RW)	Canada	Edmonton Oilers	Kelowna Buckaroos (BCHL)
72	John Vanbiesbrouck (G)	United States	New York Rangers	Sault Ste. Marie Greyhounds (OMJHL)
73	Wendell Young (G)	Canada	Vancouver Canucks	Kitchener Rangers (OMJHL)
74	Clint Malarchuk (G)	Canada	Quebec Nordiques	Portland Winter Hawks (WHL)
75	Perry Pelensky (RW)	Canada	Chicago Black Hawks	Portland Winter Hawks (WHL)
76	Jim Malwitz (C)	United States	Minnesota North Stars	Grand Rapids High School (USHS-MN)
77	Scott McLellan (RW)	Canada	Boston Bruins	Niagara Falls Flyers (OMJHL)
78	Peter Madach (C)	Sweden	Calgary Flames	HV71 (Sweden)
79	Ken Latta (RW)	Canada	Philadelphia Flyers	Sault Ste. Marie Greyhounds (OMJHL)
80	Jeff Eatough (RW)	Canada	Buffalo Sabres	Cornwall Royals (QMJHL)
81	Marty Dallman (C)	Canada	Los Angeles Kings	Rensselaer Polytechnic Institute (ECAC)
82	Kjell Dahlin (RW)	Sweden	Montreal Canadiens	Timrå IK (Sweden)
83	Anders Wikberg (LW)	Sweden	Buffalo Sabres (from St. Louis)	Timra IK (Sweden)
84	Todd Lumbard (G)	Canada	New York Islanders	Brandon Wheat Kings (WHL)
^{Reference: "1981 NHL Entry Draft hockeydraftcentral.com". Archived from the original on February 11, 2009.}

==== Notes (Round 4) ====
1.* The Detroit Red Wings' fourth round pick went to the Philadelphia Flyers as the result of a trade on September 4, 1979 that sent Dennis Sobchuk to the Detroit Red Wings in exchange for this pick. The trade was for a conditional 3rd-rd or 4th-rd pick in 1981 NHL Entry Draft. The condition of the pick is unknown.

2.* The Toronto Maple Leafs' fourth round pick went to the Minnesota North Stars as the result of a trade on June 14, 1978 that sent Paul Harrison to the Toronto Maple Leafs in exchange for this pick.

3.* The St. Louis Blues' fourth round pick went to the Buffalo Sabres as the result of a trade on October 20, 1980 that sent Bill Stewart to the Washington Capitals in exchange for Bob Hess and this pick.

=== Round five ===
#	Player	Nationality	NHL team	College/junior/club team
85	Marc Behrend (G)	United States	Winnipeg Jets	University of Wisconsin (WCHA)
86	Larry Trader (D)	Canada	Detroit Red Wings	London Knights (OMJHL)
87	Doug Speck (D)	Canada	Colorado Rockies	Peterborough Petes (OMJHL)
88	Steve Rooney (LW)	United States	Montreal Canadiens (from Hartford)	[Canton High School (USHS-MA)
89	Mike Siltala (RW)	Canada	Washington Capitals	Kingston Canadians (OMJHL)
90	Normand Lefrancois (LW)	Canada	Toronto Maple Leafs	Trois-Rivières Draveurs (QMJHL)
91	Peter Sidorkiewicz (G)	Canada	Washington Capitals (from Pittsburgh)	Oshawa Generals (OMJHL)
92	Phil Drouillard (LW)	Canada	Edmonton Oilers	Niagara Falls Flyers (OMJHL)
93	Bill Maguire (D)	Canada	Hartford Whalers (from New York Rangers)	Niagara Falls Flyers (OMJHL)
94	Jacques Sylvestre (C)	Canada	New York Islanders (from Vancouver)	Sorel Eperviers (QMJHL)
95	Ed Lee (RW)	United States	Quebec Nordiques	Princeton University (ECAC)
96	Doug Chessell (G)	Canada	Chicago Black Hawks	London Knights (OMJHL)
97	Kelly Hubbard (D)	Canada	Minnesota North Stars	Portland Winter Hawks (WHL)
98	Joe Mantione (G)	Canada	Boston Bruins	Cornwall Royals (QMJHL)
99	Mario Simioni (RW)	Canada	Calgary Flames	Toronto Marlboros (OMJHL)
100	Justin Hanley (C)	Canada	Philadelphia Flyers	Kingston Canadians (OMJHL)
101	Mauri Eivola (C)	Finland	Buffalo Sabres	TPS (Finland)
102	Barry Brigley (C)	Canada	Toronto Maple Leafs (from Los Angeles)	Calgary Wranglers (WHL)
103	Dan Bourbonnais (LW)	Canada	Hartford Whalers (from Montreal)	Calgary Wranglers (WHL)
104	Mike Hickey (C)	Canada	St. Louis Blues	Sudbury Wolves (OMJHL)
105	Moe Lemay (LW)	Canada	Vancouver Canucks (from New York Islanders)	Ottawa 67's (OMJHL)
^{Reference: "1981 NHL Entry Draft hockeydraftcentral.com". Archived from the original on February 11, 2009.}

==== Notes (Round 5) ====
1.* The Hartford Whalers' fifth round pick went to the Montreal Canadiens as the result of a trade on June 5, 1980 that sent Rick Meagher, the 61st overall pick, and the 103rd overall pick to the Hartford Whalers in exchange for the 46th overall pick and this pick.

2.* The Pittsburgh Penguins' fifth round pick went to the Washington Capitals as the result of a trade on January 2, 1981 that sent Gary Rissling to the Pittsburgh Penguins in exchange for this pick.

3.* The New York Rangers' fifth round pick went to the Hartford Whalers as the result of a trade on January 15, 1981 that sent Nick Fotiu to the New York Rangers in exchange for this pick.

4.* The Vancouver Canucks' fifth round pick went to the New York Islanders as the result of a trade on October 6, 1980 that sent Richard Brodeur and the 105th overall pick to the Vancouver Canucks in exchange for this pick.

5.* The Los Angeles Kings' fifth round pick went to the Toronto Maple Leafs as the result of a trade on March 10, 1981 that sent Jim Rutherford to the Los Angeles Kings in exchange for this pick.

6.* The Montreal Canadiens' fifth round pick went to the Hartford Whalers as the result of a trade on June 5, 1980 that sent the 46th overall pick and the 88th overall pick to the Montreal Canadiens in exchange for Rick Meagher, the 61st overall pick, and this pick.

7.* The New York Islanders' fifth round pick went to the Vancouver Canucks as the result of a trade on October 6, 1980 that sent the 94th overall pick to the New York Islanders in exchange for Richard Brodeur and this pick.

=== Round six ===
#	Player	Nationality	NHL team	College/junior/club team
106	Bob O'Connor (G)	United States	Winnipeg Jets	Boston College (ECAC)
107	Gerard Gallant (LW)	Canada	Detroit Red Wings	Sherbrooke Castors (QMJHL)
108	Bruce Driver (D)	Canada	Colorado Rockies	University of Wisconsin (WCHA)
109	Paul Edwards (D)	Canada	Pittsburgh Penguins (from Hartford)	Oshawa Generals (OMJHL)
110	Jim McGeough (C)	Canada	Washington Capitals	Billings Bighorns (WHL)
111	Steve Smith (D)	Canada	Edmonton Oilers (from Toronto)	London Knights (OMJHL)
112	Rod Buskas (D)	Canada	Pittsburgh Penguins	Medicine Hat Tigers (WHL)
113	Marc Habscheid (C)	Canada	Edmonton Oilers	Saskatoon Blades (WHL)
114	Eric Magnuson (C)	United States	New York Rangers	Rensselaer Polytechnic Institute (ECAC)
115	Stu Kulak (RW)	Canada	Vancouver Canucks	Victoria Cougars (WHL)
116	Mike Eagles (C)	Canada	Quebec Nordiques	Kitchener Rangers (OMJHL)
117	Bill Schafhauser (D)	United States	Chicago Black Hawks	Northern Michigan University (CCHA)
118	Paul Guay (RW)	United States	Minnesota North Stars	Mount Saint Charles Academy (USHS-RI)
119	Bruce Milton (D)	United States	Boston Bruins	Boston University (ECAC)
120	Todd Hooey (RW)	Canada	Calgary Flames	Windsor Spitfires (OMJHL)
121	Andre Villeneuve (D)	Canada	Philadelphia Flyers	Chicoutimi Saguenéens (QMJHL)
122	Ali Butorac (D)	Canada	Buffalo Sabres	Ottawa 67's (OMJHL)
123	Brad Thompson (D)	Canada	Los Angeles Kings	London Knights (OMJHL)
124	Tom Anastos (RW)	United States	Montreal Canadiens	Paddock Pool Saints (GLJHL)
125	Peter Aslin (G)	Sweden	St. Louis Blues	AIK (Sweden)
126	Chuck Brimmer (C)	Canada	New York Islanders	Kingston Canadiens (OMJHL)
^{Reference: "1981 NHL Entry Draft hockeydraftcentral.com". Archived from the original on February 11, 2009.}

==== Notes (round 6) ====
1.* The Hartford Whalers' sixth round pick went to the Pittsburgh Penguins as the result of a trade on February 20, 1981, that sent Gilles Lupien to the Hartford Whalers in exchange for this pick.

2.* The Toronto Maple Leafs' sixth round pick went to the Edmonton Oilers as the result of a trade on August 22, 1979, that sent Reg Thomas to the Toronto Maple Leafs in exchange for this pick.

=== Round seven ===
#	Player	Nationality	NHL team	College/junior/club team
127	Peter Nilsson (C)	Sweden	Winnipeg Jets	Hammarby IF (Sweden)
128	Greg Stefan (G)	Canada	Detroit Red Wings	Oshawa Generals (OMJHL)
129	Jeff Larmer (LW)	Canada	Colorado Rockies	Kitchener Rangers (OMJHL)
130	John Mokosak (D)	Canada	Hartford Whalers	Victoria Cougars (WHL)
131	Risto Jalo (C)	Finland	Washington Capitals	Ilves (Finland)
132	Andrew Wright (D)	Canada	Toronto Maple Leafs	Peterborough Petes (OMJHL)
133	Geoff Wilson (RW)	Canada	Pittsburgh Penguins	Winnipeg Warriors (WHL)
134	Craig Hurley (D)	Canada	Los Angeles Kings (from Edmonton)	Saskatoon Blades (WHL)
135	Mike Guentzel (D)	United States	New York Rangers	Greenway High School (USHS-MN)
136	Bruce Holloway (D)	Canada	Vancouver Canucks	Regina Pats (WHL)
137	Vladimir Svitek (RW)	Czechoslovakia	Philadelphia Flyers (from Quebec)	Košice (Czechoslovakia)
138	Marc Centrone (C)	Canada	Chicago Black Hawks	Lethbridge Broncos (WHL)
139	Jim Archibald (RW)	Canada	Minnesota North Stars	Moose Jaw Canucks (SJHL)
140	Mats Thelin (D)	Sweden	Boston Bruins	AIK (Sweden)
141	Rick Heppner (D)	United States	Calgary Flames	Mounds View High School (USHS-MN)
142	Gil Hudon (G)	Canada	Philadelphia Flyers	Prince Albert Raiders (SJHL)
143	Heikki Leime (D)	Finland	Buffalo Sabres	TPS (Finland)
144	Peter Sawkins (D)	United States	Los Angeles Kings	St. Paul Academy (USHS-MN)
145	Tom Kurvers (D)	United States	Montreal Canadiens	University of Minnesota Duluth (WCHA)
146	Erik Holmberg (C)	Sweden	St. Louis Blues	Södertälje SK (Sweden)
147	Teppo Virta (RW)	Finland	New York Islanders	TPS (Finland)
^{Reference: "1981 NHL Entry Draft hockeydraftcentral.com". Archived from the original on February 11, 2009.}

==== Notes (Round 7) ====
1.* The Edmonton Oilers' seventh round pick went to the Los Angeles Kings as the result of a trade on March 10, 1981 that sent Garry Unger to the Edmonton Oilers in exchange for this pick.

2.* The Quebec Nordiques' seventh round pick went to the Philadelphia Flyers as the result of a trade on September 15, 1980 that sent Andre Dupont to the Quebec Nordiques in exchange for this pick.

=== Round eight ===
#	Player	Nationality	NHL team	College/junior/club team
148	Dan McFall (D)	United States	Winnipeg Jets	Buffalo Jr. Sabres (NAJHL)
149	Rick Zombo (D)	United States	Detroit Red Wings	Austin Mavericks (USHL)
150	Tony Arima (LW)	Finland	Colorado Rockies	Jokerit (Finland)
151	Denis Dore (RW)	Canada	Hartford Whalers	Chicoutimi Saguenéens (QMJHL)
152	Gaetan Duchesne (LW)	Canada	Washington Capitals	Quebec Remparts (QMJHL)
153	Richard Turmel (D)	Canada	Toronto Maple Leafs	Shawinigan Cataractes (QMJHL)
154	Mitch Lamoureux (C)	Canada	Pittsburgh Penguins	Oshawa Generals (OMJHL)
155	Mike Sturgeon (D)	Canada	Edmonton Oilers	Kelowna Buckaroos (BCJHL)
156	Ari Lahteenmaki (RW)	Finland	New York Rangers	HIFK (Finland)
157	Petri Skriko (RW)	Finland	Vancouver Canucks	SaiPa (Finland)
158	Andre Cote (RW)	Canada	Quebec Nordiques	Quebec Remparts (QMJHL)
159	Johan Mellstrom (LW)	Sweden	Chicago Black Hawks	Falun (Sweden)
160	Kari Kanervo (C)	Finland	Minnesota North Stars	TPS (Finland)
161	Armel Parisee (D)	Canada	Boston Bruins	Chicoutimi Saguenéens (QMJHL)
162	Dale DeGray (D)	Canada	Calgary Flames	Oshawa Generals (OMJHL)
163	Steve Taylor (LW)	United States	Philadelphia Flyers	Providence College (ECAC)
164	Gates Orlando (C)	Canada	Buffalo Sabres	Providence College (ECAC)
165	Dan Brennan (LW)	Canada	Los Angeles Kings	University of North Dakota (WCHA)
166	Paul Gess (LW)	United States	Montreal Canadiens	Bloomington Jefferson High School (USHS-MN)
167	Alain Vigneault (D)	Canada	St. Louis Blues	Trois-Rivières Draveurs (QMJHL)
168	Bill Dowd (D)	Canada	New York Islanders	Ottawa 67's (OMJHL)
^{Reference: "1981 NHL Entry Draft hockeydraftcentral.com". Archived from the original on February 11, 2009.}

=== Round nine ===
#	Player	Nationality	NHL team	College/junior/club team
169	Greg Dick (G)	United States	Winnipeg Jets	St. Mary's College (NCAA)
170	Don LeBlanc (LW)	Canada	Detroit Red Wings	Moncton Hawks (NBJHL)
171	Tim Army (C)	United States	Colorado Rockies	East Providence High School (USHS-RI)
172	Jeff Poeschl (G)	United States	Hartford Whalers	Northern Michigan University (CCHA)
173	George White (LW)	United States	Washington Capitals	University of New Hampshire (ECAC)
174	Greg Barber (D)	Canada	Toronto Maple Leafs	Victoria Cougars (WHL)
175	Dean DeFazio (LW)	Canada	Pittsburgh Penguins	Brantford Alexanders (OMJHL)
176	Miloslav Horava (D)	Czechoslovakia	Edmonton Oilers	Kladno (Czechoslovakia)
177	Paul Reifenberger (C)	United States	New York Rangers	Anoka High School (USHS-MN)
178	Frank Caprice (G)	Canada	Vancouver Canucks	London Knights (OMJHL)
179	Marc Brisebois (RW)	Canada	Quebec Nordiques	Sorel Eperviers (QMJHL)
180	John Benns (LW)	Canada	Chicago Black Hawks	Billings Bighorns (WHL)
181	Scott Bjugstad (C)	United States	Minnesota North Stars	University of Minnesota (WCHA)
182	Don Sylvestri (G)	Canada	Boston Bruins	Clarkson University (ECAC)
183	George Boudreau (D)	United States	Calgary Flames	Matignon High School (USHS-MA)
184	Len Hachborn (C)	Canada	Philadelphia Flyers	Brantford Alexanders(OMJHL)
185	Venci Sebek (D)	Canada	Buffalo Sabres	Niagara Falls Flyers (OMJHL)
186	Al Tuer (D)	Canada	Los Angeles Kings	Regina Pats (WHL)
187	Scott Ferguson (D)	United States	Montreal Canadiens	Edina West High School (USHS-MN)
188	Dan Wood (RW)	Canada	St. Louis Blues	Kingston Canadians (OMJHL)
189	Scott MacLellan (C)	Canada	New York Islanders	Burlington Cougars (CBJHL)
^{Reference: "1981 NHL Entry Draft hockeydraftcentral.com". Archived from the original on February 11, 2009.}

=== Round ten ===
#	Player	Nationality	NHL team	College/junior/club team
190	Vladimir Kadlec (D)	Czechoslovakia	Winnipeg Jets	Vitkovice (Czechoslovakia)
191	Robert Nordmark (D)	Sweden	Detroit Red Wings	Frolunda (Sweden)
192	John Johannson (C)	United States	Colorado Rockies	University of Wisconsin (WCHA)
193	Larry Power (C)	Canada	Hartford Whalers	Kitchener Dutchmen (MWJBHL)
194	Chris Valentine (C)	Canada	Washington Capitals	Sorel Eperviers (QMJHL)
195	Marc Magnan (LW)	Canada	Toronto Maple Leafs	Lethbridge Broncos (WHL)
196	Dave Hannan (C)	Canada	Pittsburgh Penguins	Brantford Alexanders (OMJHL)
197	Gord Sherven (C)	Canada	Edmonton Oilers	Weyburn Red Wings (SJHL)
198	Mario Proulx (G)	Canada	New York Rangers	Providence College (ECAC)
199	Rejean Vignola (C)	Canada	Vancouver Canucks	Shawinigan Cataractes (QMJHL)
200	Kari Takko (G)	Finland	Quebec Nordiques	Ässät (Finland)
201	Sylvain Roy (D)	Canada	Chicago Black Hawks	Hull Olympiques (QMJHL)
202	Steve Kudebeh (G)	United States	Minnesota North Stars	Breck School (USHS-MN)
203	Richard Bourque (LW)	Canada	Boston Bruins	Sherbrooke Castors (QMJHL)
204	Bruce Eakin (C)	Canada	Calgary Flames	Saskatoon Blades (WHL)
205	Steve Tsujiura (C)	Canada	Philadelphia Flyers	Medicine Hat Tigers (WHL)
206	Warren Harper (RW)	Canada	Buffalo Sabres	Prince Albert Raiders (SJHL)
207	Jeff Baikie (LW)	Canada	Los Angeles Kings	Cornell University (ECAC)
208	Dan Burrows (G)	Canada	Montreal Canadiens	Belleville Bulls (OPJHL)
209	Richard Zemlak (RW)	Canada	St. Louis Blues	Spokane Flyers (WHL)
210	Dave Randerson (RW)	Canada	New York Islanders	Stratford Cullitons (MWJBHL)
^{Reference:"1981 NHL Entry Draft hockeydraftcentral.com". Archived from the original on February 11, 2009.}

=== Round eleven ===
#	Player	Nationality	NHL team	College/junior/club team
211	Dave Kirwin (D)	United States	Winnipeg Jets	Irondale High School (USHS-MN)
^{Reference: "1981 NHL Entry Draft hockeydraftcentral.com". Archived from the original on February 11, 2009.}

==== Notes (Round 11) ====
1.* Bonus selection awarded from NHL as compensation for accepting move from the Smythe Division to the Norris Division for the 1981–82 NHL season

= NHL All-Star team ·	= NHL All-Star ·	= NHL All-Star and NHL All-Star team ·	= Hall of Famers

== Draftees based on nationality ==
Rank	Country	Amount
	North America	179
1	Canada	143
2	United States	36
	Europe	32
3	Sweden	14
4	Finland	12
5	Czechoslovakia	4
6	West Germany	2

== See also ==
- 1981–82 NHL season
- List of NHL players
