= Dave Donnelly =

Canadian ice hockey player (born 1962)

- Born: February 2, 1962 (age 64) Edmonton, Alberta, Canada
- Height: 5 ft 11 in (180 cm)
- Weight: 185 lb (84 kg; 13 st 3 lb)
- Position: Centre
- Shot: Left
- Played for: EV Landshut; KalPa; Edmonton Oilers; Chicago Blackhawks; Boston Bruins
- National team: Canada
- NHL draft: 27th overall, 1981; Minnesota North Stars
- Playing career: 1983–1992

David M. Donnelly (born February 2, 1962) is a Canadian former professional ice hockey forward who played 137 games in the National Hockey League for the Boston Bruins and Chicago Blackhawks. Internationally, Donnelly played for the Canadian national team at the 1984 Winter Olympics.

== Career statistics ==
=== Regular season and playoffs ===
| | | | Regular season | | | | | Playoffs |
| Season | Team | League | GP | G | A | Pts | PIM | GP | G | A | Pts | PIM |
|---|---|---|---|---|---|---|---|---|---|---|---|---|
| 1979–80 | St. Albert Saints | AJHL | 59 | 27 | 33 | 60 | 146 | — | — | — | — | — |
| 1980–81 | St. Albert Saints | AJHL | 53 | 39 | 55 | 94 | 243 | 17 | 20 | 14 | 34 | 87 |
| 1981–82 | University of North Dakota | WCHA | 38 | 10 | 15 | 25 | 38 | — | — | — | — | — |
| 1982–83 | University of North Dakota | WCHA | 34 | 18 | 16 | 34 | 106 | — | — | — | — | — |
| 1983–84 | Canadian National Team | Intl | 71 | 18 | 14 | 32 | 64 | — | — | — | — | — |
| 1983–84 | Boston Bruins | NHL | 16 | 3 | 4 | 7 | 2 | 3 | 0 | 0 | 0 | 0 |
| 1984–85 | Hershey Bears | AHL | 26 | 11 | 6 | 17 | 28 | — | — | — | — | — |
| 1984–85 | Boston Bruins | NHL | 38 | 6 | 8 | 14 | 46 | 1 | 0 | 0 | 0 | 0 |
| 1985–86 | Boston Bruins | NHL | 8 | 0 | 0 | 0 | 17 | — | — | — | — | — |
| 1986–87 | Chicago Blackhawks | NHL | 71 | 6 | 12 | 18 | 81 | 1 | 0 | 0 | 0 | 0 |
| 1987–88 | Edmonton Oilers | NHL | 4 | 0 | 0 | 0 | 4 | — | — | — | — | — |
| 1988–89 | KalPa | SM-l | 43 | 20 | 22 | 42 | 98 | 2 | 0 | 2 | 2 | 14 |
| 1989–90 | EV Landshut | 1.GBun | 33 | 12 | 21 | 33 | 87 | — | — | — | — | — |
| 1990–91 | Maine Mariners | AHL | 67 | 21 | 30 | 51 | 135 | 2 | 1 | 2 | 3 | 10 |
| 1991–92 | Canadian National Team | Intl | 12 | 5 | 9 | 14 | 10 | — | — | — | — | — |
| NHL totals | | | 137 | 15 | 24 | 39 | 150 | 5 | 0 | 0 | 0 | 0 |

=== International ===
| Year | Team | Event | GP | G | A | Pts | PIM |
|---|---|---|---|---|---|---|---|
| 1984 | Canada | OG | 7 | 1 | 1 | 2 | 12 |
| Senior totals | | | 7 | 1 | 1 | 2 | 12 |
