= Kim Davis (ice hockey) =

Canadian ice hockey player (born 1957)

- Born: October 31, 1957 (age 67); Flin Flon, Manitoba, Canada
- Height: 5 ft 11 in (180 cm)
- Weight: 180 lb (82 kg; 12 st 12 lb)
- Position: Centre
- Shot: Left
- Played for: NHL; Pittsburgh Penguins; Toronto Maple Leafs; AHL; Syracuse Firebirds; Binghamton Whalers; Springfield Indians; New Brunswick Hawks
- NHL draft: 48th overall, 1977; Pittsburgh Penguins
- WHA draft: 24th overall, 1977; Edmonton Oilers
- Playing career: 1977–1982

Kim C. Davis (born October 31, 1957) is a Canadian retired ice hockey centre. He played in a total of 36 National Hockey League games for the Pittsburgh Penguins and Toronto Maple Leafs. Davis was born in Flin Flon, Manitoba. He was also the commissioner of the Manitoba Junior Hockey League from 2002 to 2020.

== Career statistics ==
			Regular Season					Playoffs
Season	Team	League	GP	G	A	Pts	PIM	GP	G	A	Pts	PIM
1974–75	Flin Flon Bombers	WCHL	64	8	7	15	169	—	—	—	—	—
1975–76	Flin Flon Bombers	WCHL	71	32	45	77	163	—	—	—	—	—
1976–77	Flin Flon Bombers	WCHL	69	56	55	111	250	—	—	—	—	—
1977–78	Pittsburgh Penguins	NHL	1	0	0	0	0	—	—	—	—	—
1977–78	Dayton/Grand Rapids Owls	IHL	63	28	43	71	191	—	—	—	—	—
1978–79	Pittsburgh Penguins	NHL	1	1	0	1	0	—	—	—	—	—
1978–79	Grand Rapids Owls	IHL	80	44	59	103	235	22	12	15	27	77
1979–80	Pittsburgh Penguins	NHL	24	3	7	10	43	4	0	0	0	0
1979–80	Syracuse Firebirds	AHL	45	13	13	26	62	—	—	—	—	—
1980–81	Binghamton Whalers	AHL	8	1	1	2	26	—	—	—	—	—
1980–81	Springfield Indians	AHL	26	5	4	9	56	—	—	—	—	—
1980–81	New Brunswick Hawks	AHL	32	8	13	21	65	2	0	0	0	21
1980–81	Pittsburgh Penguins	NHL	8	1	0	1	4	—	—	—	—	—
1980–81	Toronto Maple Leafs	NHL	2	0	0	0	4	—	—	—	—	—
1981–82	New Brunswick Hawks	AHL	79	11	24	35	47	14	1	2	3	8
NHL totals			36	5	7	12	51	4	0	0	0	0

== See also ==
- Kim Davis Trophy
