= List of Montreal Canadiens award winners =

Montreal Canadiens awards
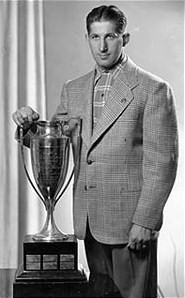
- Elmer Lach with the Hart Memorial Trophy.

Team trophies
- Award*: Wins
- Stanley Cup: 24
- Clarence S. Campbell Bowl: 1
- Prince of Wales Trophy: 25
- O'Brien Trophy: 11

Individual awards
- Award*: Wins
- Art Ross Trophy: 9
- Bill Masterton Memorial Trophy: 6
- Calder Memorial Trophy: 7
- Charlie Conacher Memorial Trophy: 1
- Conn Smythe Trophy: 9
- Frank J. Selke Trophy: 8
- Hart Memorial Trophy: 17
- Jack Adams Award: 2
- James Norris Memorial Trophy: 12
- King Clancy Memorial Trophy: 1
- Lady Byng Memorial Trophy: 3
- NHL Lifetime Achievement Award: 1
- Roger Crozier Saving Grace Award: 2
- Ted Lindsay Award: 4
- Vezina Trophy: 29
- William M. Jennings Trophy: 6

Total
- Awards won: 178

This is a list of Montreal Canadiens award winners.

== League awards ==
=== Team trophies ===
Team trophies awarded to the Montreal Canadiens
Award	Description	Times won	Seasons	References
Stanley Cup	NHA/NHL vs. PCHA/WCHL/WHL championship (1914–26)	2	1915–16, 1923–24	
Stanley Cup	NHL championship (1926–present)	22	1929–30, 1930–31, 1943–44, 1945–46, 1952–53, 1955–56, 1956–57, 1957–58, 1958–59, 1959–60, 1964–65, 1965–66, 1967–68, 1968–69, 1970–71, 1972–73, 1975–76, 1976–77, 1977–78, 1978–79, 1985–86, 1992–93	
O'Brien Trophy	NHA championship (1910–17)	2	1915–16, 1916–17	
O'Brien Trophy	NHL playoff championship (1917–26)	3	1918–19, 1923–24, 1924–25	
O'Brien Trophy	Canadian Division champion (1927–38)	5	1927–28, 1928–29, 1930–31, 1931–32, 1936–37	
O'Brien Trophy	NHL championship runner-up (1938–50)	1	1946–47	
Prince of Wales Trophy	NHL playoff championship (1923–26)	2	1923–24, 1924–25	
Prince of Wales Trophy	Regular season championship (1938–67)	12	1943–44, 1944–45, 1945–46, 1946–47, 1955–56, 1957–58, 1958–59, 1959–60, 1960–61, 1961–62, 1963–64, 1965–66	
Prince of Wales Trophy	East Division champions (1967–74)	3	1967–68, 1968–69, 1972–73	
Prince of Wales Trophy	Wales Conference regular season championship (1974–81)	5	1975–76, 1976–77, 1977–78, 1978–79, 1980–81	
Prince of Wales Trophy	Wales/Eastern Conference playoff championship (1981–2020; 2021–present)	3	1985–86, 1988–89, 1992–93	
Clarence S. Campbell Bowl	NHL semifinal championship (2020–21)	1	2020–21	

=== Individual awards ===
Individual awards won by Montreal Canadiens players and staff
Award	Description	Winner	Season	References
Art Ross Trophy	Regular season scoring champion	Elmer Lach	1947–48	
Art Ross Trophy	Regular season scoring champion	Bernie Geoffrion	1954–55	
Art Ross Trophy	Regular season scoring champion	Bernie Geoffrion	1960–61	
Art Ross Trophy	Regular season scoring champion	Jean Beliveau	1955–56	
Art Ross Trophy	Regular season scoring champion	Dickie Moore	1957–58	
Art Ross Trophy	Regular season scoring champion	Dickie Moore	1958–59	
Art Ross Trophy	Regular season scoring champion	Guy Lafleur	1975–76	
Art Ross Trophy	Regular season scoring champion	Guy Lafleur	1976–77	
Art Ross Trophy	Regular season scoring champion	Guy Lafleur	1977–78	
Bill Masterton Memorial Trophy	Perseverance, sportsmanship and dedication to hockey	Claude Provost	1967–68	
Bill Masterton Memorial Trophy	Perseverance, sportsmanship and dedication to hockey	Henri Richard	1973–74	
Bill Masterton Memorial Trophy	Perseverance, sportsmanship and dedication to hockey	Serge Savard	1978–79	
Bill Masterton Memorial Trophy	Perseverance, sportsmanship and dedication to hockey	Saku Koivu	2001–02	
Bill Masterton Memorial Trophy	Perseverance, sportsmanship and dedication to hockey	Max Pacioretty	2011–12	
Bill Masterton Memorial Trophy	Perseverance, sportsmanship and dedication to hockey	Carey Price	2021–22	
Calder Memorial Trophy	Rookie of the year	Johnny Quilty	1940–41	
Calder Memorial Trophy	Rookie of the year	Bernie Geoffrion	1951–52	
Calder Memorial Trophy	Rookie of the year	Ralph Backstrom	1958–59	
Calder Memorial Trophy	Rookie of the year	Bobby Rousseau	1961–62	
Calder Memorial Trophy	Rookie of the year	Jacques Laperriere	1963–64	
Calder Memorial Trophy	Rookie of the year	Ken Dryden	1971–72	
Calder Memorial Trophy	Rookie of the year	Lane Hutson	2024–25	
Conn Smythe Trophy	Most valuable player of the playoffs	Jean Beliveau	1964–65	
Conn Smythe Trophy	Most valuable player of the playoffs	Serge Savard	1968–69	
Conn Smythe Trophy	Most valuable player of the playoffs	Ken Dryden	1970–71	
Conn Smythe Trophy	Most valuable player of the playoffs	Yvan Cournoyer	1972–73	
Conn Smythe Trophy	Most valuable player of the playoffs	Guy Lafleur	1976–77	
Conn Smythe Trophy	Most valuable player of the playoffs	Larry Robinson	1977–78	
Conn Smythe Trophy	Most valuable player of the playoffs	Bob Gainey	1978–79	
Conn Smythe Trophy	Most valuable player of the playoffs	Patrick Roy	1985–86	
Conn Smythe Trophy	Most valuable player of the playoffs	Patrick Roy	1992–93	
Frank J. Selke Trophy	Forward who best excels in the defensive aspect of the game	Bob Gainey	1977–78	
Frank J. Selke Trophy	Forward who best excels in the defensive aspect of the game	Bob Gainey	1978–79	
Frank J. Selke Trophy	Forward who best excels in the defensive aspect of the game	Bob Gainey	1979–80	
Frank J. Selke Trophy	Forward who best excels in the defensive aspect of the game	Bob Gainey	1980–81	
Frank J. Selke Trophy	Forward who best excels in the defensive aspect of the game	Guy Carbonneau	1987–88	
Frank J. Selke Trophy	Forward who best excels in the defensive aspect of the game	Guy Carbonneau	1988–89	
Frank J. Selke Trophy	Forward who best excels in the defensive aspect of the game	Guy Carbonneau	1991–92	
Frank J. Selke Trophy	Forward who best excels in the defensive aspect of the game	Nick Suzuki	2025–26	
Hart Memorial Trophy	Most valuable player to his team during the regular season	Herb Gardiner	1926–27	
Hart Memorial Trophy	Most valuable player to his team during the regular season	Howie Morenz	1927–28	
Hart Memorial Trophy	Most valuable player to his team during the regular season	Howie Morenz	1930–31	
Hart Memorial Trophy	Most valuable player to his team during the regular season	Howie Morenz	1931–32	
Hart Memorial Trophy	Most valuable player to his team during the regular season	Aurele Joliat	1933–34	
Hart Memorial Trophy	Most valuable player to his team during the regular season	Babe Siebert	1936–37	
Hart Memorial Trophy	Most valuable player to his team during the regular season	Toe Blake	1938–39	
Hart Memorial Trophy	Most valuable player to his team during the regular season	Elmer Lach	1944–45	
Hart Memorial Trophy	Most valuable player to his team during the regular season	Maurice Richard	1946–47	
Hart Memorial Trophy	Most valuable player to his team during the regular season	Jean Beliveau	1955–56	
Hart Memorial Trophy	Most valuable player to his team during the regular season	Jean Beliveau	1963–64	
Hart Memorial Trophy	Most valuable player to his team during the regular season	Bernie Geoffrion	1960–61	
Hart Memorial Trophy	Most valuable player to his team during the regular season	Jacques Plante	1961–62	
Hart Memorial Trophy	Most valuable player to his team during the regular season	Guy Lafleur	1976–77	
Hart Memorial Trophy	Most valuable player to his team during the regular season	Guy Lafleur	1977–78	
Hart Memorial Trophy	Most valuable player to his team during the regular season	Jose Theodore	2001–02	
Hart Memorial Trophy	Most valuable player to his team during the regular season	Carey Price	2014–15	
Jack Adams Award	Top coach during the regular season	Scotty Bowman	1976–77	
Jack Adams Award	Top coach during the regular season	Pat Burns	1988–89	
James Norris Memorial Trophy	Top defenceman during the regular season	Doug Harvey	1954–55	
James Norris Memorial Trophy	Top defenceman during the regular season	Doug Harvey	1955–56	
James Norris Memorial Trophy	Top defenceman during the regular season	Doug Harvey	1956–57	
James Norris Memorial Trophy	Top defenceman during the regular season	Doug Harvey	1957–58	
James Norris Memorial Trophy	Top defenceman during the regular season	Doug Harvey	1959–60	
James Norris Memorial Trophy	Top defenceman during the regular season	Doug Harvey	1960–61	
James Norris Memorial Trophy	Top defenceman during the regular season	Tom Johnson	1958–59	
James Norris Memorial Trophy	Top defenceman during the regular season	Jacques Laperriere	1965–66	
James Norris Memorial Trophy	Top defenceman during the regular season	Larry Robinson	1976–77	
James Norris Memorial Trophy	Top defenceman during the regular season	Larry Robinson	1979–80	
James Norris Memorial Trophy	Top defenceman during the regular season	Chris Chelios	1988–89	
James Norris Memorial Trophy	Top defenceman during the regular season	P. K. Subban	2012–13	
King Clancy Memorial Trophy	Leadership qualities on and off the ice and humanitarian contributions within their community	Saku Koivu	2006–07	
Lady Byng Memorial Trophy	Gentlemanly conduct	Toe Blake	1945–46	
Lady Byng Memorial Trophy	Gentlemanly conduct	Mats Naslund	1987–88	
Lady Byng Memorial Trophy	Gentlemanly conduct	Cole Caufield	2025–26	
NHL Lifetime Achievement Award	Long term contributions to hockey	Jean Beliveau	2008–09	
Roger Crozier Saving Grace Award	Goaltender with the best save percentage	Jose Theodore	2001–02	
Roger Crozier Saving Grace Award	Goaltender with the best save percentage	Cristobal Huet	2005–06	
Ted Lindsay Award	Most valuable player as chosen by the players	Guy Lafleur	1975–76	
Ted Lindsay Award	Most valuable player as chosen by the players	Guy Lafleur	1976–77	
Ted Lindsay Award	Most valuable player as chosen by the players	Guy Lafleur	1977–78	
Ted Lindsay Award	Most valuable player as chosen by the players	Carey Price	2014–15	
Vezina Trophy	Fewest goals given up in the regular season (1927–1981)	George Hainsworth	1926–27	
Vezina Trophy	Fewest goals given up in the regular season (1927–1981)	George Hainsworth	1927–28	
Vezina Trophy	Fewest goals given up in the regular season (1927–1981)	George Hainsworth	1928–29	
Vezina Trophy	Fewest goals given up in the regular season (1927–1981)	Bill Durnan	1943–44	
Vezina Trophy	Fewest goals given up in the regular season (1927–1981)	Bill Durnan	1944–45	
Vezina Trophy	Fewest goals given up in the regular season (1927–1981)	Bill Durnan	1945–46	
Vezina Trophy	Fewest goals given up in the regular season (1927–1981)	Bill Durnan	1946–47	
Vezina Trophy	Fewest goals given up in the regular season (1927–1981)	Bill Durnan	1948–49	
Vezina Trophy	Fewest goals given up in the regular season (1927–1981)	Bill Durnan	1949–50	
Vezina Trophy	Fewest goals given up in the regular season (1927–1981)	Jacques Plante	1955–56	
Vezina Trophy	Fewest goals given up in the regular season (1927–1981)	Jacques Plante	1956–57	
Vezina Trophy	Fewest goals given up in the regular season (1927–1981)	Jacques Plante	1957–58	
Vezina Trophy	Fewest goals given up in the regular season (1927–1981)	Jacques Plante	1958–59	
Vezina Trophy	Fewest goals given up in the regular season (1927–1981)	Jacques Plante	1959–60	
Vezina Trophy	Fewest goals given up in the regular season (1927–1981)	Jacques Plante	1961–62	
Vezina Trophy	Fewest goals given up in the regular season (1927–1981)	Charlie Hodge	1963–64	
Vezina Trophy	Fewest goals given up in the regular season (1927–1981)	Charlie Hodge	1965–66	
Vezina Trophy	Fewest goals given up in the regular season (1927–1981)	Gump Worsley	1965–66	
Vezina Trophy	Fewest goals given up in the regular season (1927–1981)	Rogatien Vachon	1967–68	
Vezina Trophy	Fewest goals given up in the regular season (1927–1981)	Gump Worsley	1967–68	
Vezina Trophy	Fewest goals given up in the regular season (1927–1981)	Ken Dryden	1972–73	
Vezina Trophy	Fewest goals given up in the regular season (1927–1981)	Ken Dryden	1975–76	
Vezina Trophy	Fewest goals given up in the regular season (1927–1981)	Ken Dryden	1976–77	
Vezina Trophy	Fewest goals given up in the regular season (1927–1981)	Michel Larocque	1976–77	
Vezina Trophy	Fewest goals given up in the regular season (1927–1981)	Ken Dryden	1977–78	
Vezina Trophy	Fewest goals given up in the regular season (1927–1981)	Michel Larocque	1977–78	
Vezina Trophy	Fewest goals given up in the regular season (1927–1981)	Ken Dryden	1978–79	
Vezina Trophy	Fewest goals given up in the regular season (1927–1981)	Michel Larocque	1978–79	
Vezina Trophy	Fewest goals given up in the regular season (1927–1981)	Denis Herron	1980–81	
Vezina Trophy	Fewest goals given up in the regular season (1927–1981)	Michel Larocque	1980–81	
Vezina Trophy	Fewest goals given up in the regular season (1927–1981)	Richard Sevigny	1980–81	
Vezina Trophy	Top goaltender (1981–present)	Patrick Roy	1988–89	
Vezina Trophy	Top goaltender (1981–present)	Patrick Roy	1989–90	
Vezina Trophy	Top goaltender (1981–present)	Patrick Roy	1991–92	
Vezina Trophy	Top goaltender (1981–present)	Jose Theodore	2001–02	
Vezina Trophy	Top goaltender (1981–present)	Carey Price	2014–15	
William M. Jennings Trophy	Fewest goals given up in the regular season (1981–present)	Denis Herron	1981–82	
William M. Jennings Trophy	Fewest goals given up in the regular season (1981–present)	Rick Wamsley	1981–82	
William M. Jennings Trophy	Fewest goals given up in the regular season (1981–present)	Brian Hayward	1986–87	
William M. Jennings Trophy	Fewest goals given up in the regular season (1981–present)	Patrick Roy	1986–87	
William M. Jennings Trophy	Fewest goals given up in the regular season (1981–present)	Brian Hayward	1987–88	
William M. Jennings Trophy	Fewest goals given up in the regular season (1981–present)	Patrick Roy	1987–88	
William M. Jennings Trophy	Fewest goals given up in the regular season (1981–present)	Brian Hayward	1988–89	
William M. Jennings Trophy	Fewest goals given up in the regular season (1981–present)	Patrick Roy	1988–89	
William M. Jennings Trophy	Fewest goals given up in the regular season (1981–present)	Patrick Roy	1991–92	
William M. Jennings Trophy	Fewest goals given up in the regular season (1981–present)	Carey Price	2014–15 (Note: Shared with Corey Crawford of the Chicago Blackhawks.)	

== All-Stars ==
=== NHL first and second team All-Stars ===
The NHL first and second team All-Stars are the top players at each position as voted on by the Professional Hockey Writers' Association (PHWA).

Montreal Canadiens selected to the NHL First and Second Team All-Stars
Player	Position	Selections	Season	Team
Jean Beliveau	Centre	10	1954–55	1st
Jean Beliveau	Centre	10	1955–56	1st
Jean Beliveau	Centre	10	1956–57	1st
Jean Beliveau	Centre	10	1957–58	2nd
Jean Beliveau	Centre	10	1958–59	1st
Jean Beliveau	Centre	10	1959–60	1st
Jean Beliveau	Centre	10	1960–61	1st
Jean Beliveau	Centre	10	1963–64	2nd
Jean Beliveau	Centre	10	1965–66	2nd
Jean Beliveau	Centre	10	1968–69	2nd
Toe Blake	Left wing	5	1937–38	2nd
Toe Blake	Left wing	5	1938–39	1st
Toe Blake	Left wing	5	1939–40	1st
Toe Blake	Left wing	5	1944–45	1st
Toe Blake	Left wing	5	1945–46	2nd
Emile Bouchard	Defence	4	1943–44	2nd
Emile Bouchard	Defence	4	1944–45	1st
Emile Bouchard	Defence	4	1945–46	1st
Emile Bouchard	Defence	4	1946–47	1st
Cole Caufield	Left wing	1	2025–26	2nd
Chris Chelios	Defence	1	1988–89	1st
Yvan Cournoyer	Right wing	2	1968–69	2nd
Yvan Cournoyer	Right wing	2	1970–71	2nd
Yvan Cournoyer	Right wing	2	1971–72	2nd
Yvan Cournoyer	Right wing	2	1972–73	2nd
Wilf Cude	Goaltender	2	1935–36	2nd
Wilf Cude	Goaltender	2	1936–37	2nd
Ken Dryden	Goaltender	6	1971–72	2nd
Ken Dryden	Goaltender	6	1972–73	1st
Ken Dryden	Goaltender	6	1975–76	1st
Ken Dryden	Goaltender	6	1976–77	1st
Ken Dryden	Goaltender	6	1977–78	1st
Ken Dryden	Goaltender	6	1978–79	1st
Bill Durnan	Goaltender	6	1943–44	1st
Bill Durnan	Goaltender	6	1944–45	1st
Bill Durnan	Goaltender	6	1945–46	1st
Bill Durnan	Goaltender	6	1946–47	1st
Bill Durnan	Goaltender	6	1948–49	1st
Bill Durnan	Goaltender	6	1949–50	1st
Brian Engblom	Defence	1	1981–82	2nd
Bernie Geoffrion	Right wing	3	1954–55	2nd
Bernie Geoffrion	Right wing	3	1959–60	2nd
Bernie Geoffrion	Right wing	3	1960–61	1st
Ted Harris	Defence	1	1968–69	2nd
Glen Harmon	Defence	2	1944–45	2nd
Glen Harmon	Defence	2	1948–49	2nd
Cecil Hart	Coach	1	1936–37	2nd
Doug Harvey	Defence	10	1951–52	1st
Doug Harvey	Defence	10	1952–53	1st
Doug Harvey	Defence	10	1953–54	1st
Doug Harvey	Defence	10	1954–55	1st
Doug Harvey	Defence	10	1955–56	1st
Doug Harvey	Defence	10	1956–57	1st
Doug Harvey	Defence	10	1957–58	1st
Doug Harvey	Defence	10	1958–59	2nd
Doug Harvey	Defence	10	1959–60	1st
Doug Harvey	Defence	10	1960–61	1st
Charlie Hodge	Goaltender	2	1963–64	2nd
Charlie Hodge	Goaltender	2	1964–65	2nd
Dick Irvin	Coach	4	1940–41	2nd
Dick Irvin	Coach	4	1943–44	1st
Dick Irvin	Coach	4	1944–45	1st
Dick Irvin	Coach	4	1945–46	1st
Tom Johnson	Defence	2	1955–56	2nd
Tom Johnson	Defence	2	1958–59	1st
Aurele Joliat	Left wing	4	1930–31	1st
Aurele Joliat	Left wing	4	1931–32	2nd
Aurele Joliat	Left wing	4	1933–34	2nd
Aurele Joliat	Left wing	4	1934–35	2nd
Alexei Kovalev	Right wing	1	2007–08	2nd
Elmer Lach	Centre	5	1943–44	2nd
Elmer Lach	Centre	5	1944–45	1st
Elmer Lach	Centre	5	1945–46	2nd
Elmer Lach	Centre	5	1947–48	1st
Elmer Lach	Centre	5	1951–52	1st
Guy Lafleur	Right wing	6	1974–75	1st
Guy Lafleur	Right wing	6	1975–76	1st
Guy Lafleur	Right wing	6	1976–77	1st
Guy Lafleur	Right wing	6	1977–78	1st
Guy Lafleur	Right wing	6	1978–79	1st
Guy Lafleur	Right wing	6	1979–80	1st
Jacques Laperriere	Defence	4	1963–64	2nd
Jacques Laperriere	Defence	4	1964–65	1st
Jacques Laperriere	Defence	4	1965–66	1st
Jacques Laperriere	Defence	4	1969–70	2nd
Guy Lapointe	Defence	4	1972–73	1st
Guy Lapointe	Defence	4	1974–75	2nd
Guy Lapointe	Defence	4	1975–76	2nd
Guy Lapointe	Defence	4	1976–77	2nd
Frank Mahovlich	Left wing	1	1972–73	1st
Sylvio Mantha	Defence	2	1930–31	2nd
Sylvio Mantha	Defence	2	1931–32	2nd
Gerry McNeil	Goaltender	1	1952–53	2nd
Dickie Moore	Left wing	3	1957–58	1st
Dickie Moore	Left wing	3	1958–59	1st
Dickie Moore	Left wing	3	1960–61	2nd
Howie Morenz	Centre	3	1930–31	1st
Howie Morenz	Centre	3	1931–32	1st
Howie Morenz	Centre	3	1932–33	2nd
Ken Mosdell	Centre	2	1953–54	1st
Ken Mosdell	Centre	2	1954–55	2nd
Mats Naslund	Left wing	1	1985–86	2nd
Bert Olmstead	Left wing	2	1952–53	2nd
Bert Olmstead	Left wing	2	1955–56	2nd
Jacques Plante	Goaltender	6	1955–56	1st
Jacques Plante	Goaltender	6	1956–57	2nd
Jacques Plante	Goaltender	6	1957–58	2nd
Jacques Plante	Goaltender	6	1958–59	1st
Jacques Plante	Goaltender	6	1959–60	2nd
Jacques Plante	Goaltender	6	1961–62	1st
Carey Price	Goaltender	1	2014–15	1st
Claude Provost	Right wing	1	1964–65	1st
Ken Reardon	Defence	5	1945–46	2nd
Ken Reardon	Defence	5	1946–47	1st
Ken Reardon	Defence	5	1947–48	2nd
Ken Reardon	Defence	5	1948–49	2nd
Ken Reardon	Defence	5	1949–50	1st
Henri Richard	Centre	4	1957–58	1st
Henri Richard	Centre	4	1958–59	2nd
Henri Richard	Centre	4	1960–61	2nd
Henri Richard	Centre	4	1962–63	2nd
Maurice Richard	Right wing	14	1943–44	2nd
Maurice Richard	Right wing	14	1944–45	1st
Maurice Richard	Right wing	14	1945–46	1st
Maurice Richard	Right wing	14	1946–47	1st
Maurice Richard	Right wing	14	1947–48	1st
Maurice Richard	Right wing	14	1948–49	1st
Maurice Richard	Right wing	14	1949–50	1st
Maurice Richard	Right wing	14	1950–51	2nd
Maurice Richard	Right wing	14	1951–52	2nd
Maurice Richard	Right wing	14	1952–53	2nd
Maurice Richard	Right wing	14	1953–54	2nd
Maurice Richard	Right wing	14	1954–55	1st
Maurice Richard	Right wing	14	1955–56	1st
Maurice Richard	Right wing	14	1956–57	2nd
Larry Robinson	Defence	6	1976–77	1st
Larry Robinson	Defence	6	1977–78	2nd
Larry Robinson	Defence	6	1978–79	1st
Larry Robinson	Defence	6	1979–80	1st
Larry Robinson	Defence	6	1980–81	2nd
Larry Robinson	Defence	6	1985–86	2nd
Bobby Rousseau	Right wing	1	1965–66	2nd
Patrick Roy	Goaltender	5	1987–88	2nd
Patrick Roy	Goaltender	5	1988–89	1st
Patrick Roy	Goaltender	5	1989–90	1st
Patrick Roy	Goaltender	5	1990–91	2nd
Patrick Roy	Goaltender	5	1991–92	1st
Serge Savard	Defence	1	1978–79	2nd
Steve Shutt	Left wing	3	1976–77	1st
Steve Shutt	Left wing	3	1977–78	2nd
Steve Shutt	Left wing	3	1979–80	2nd
Babe Siebert	Defence	2	1936–37	1st
Babe Siebert	Defence	2	1937–38	1st
P. K. Subban	Defence	2	2012–13	1st
P. K. Subban	Defence	2	2014–15	1st
Jean-Guy Talbot	Defence	1	1961–62	1st
Jose Theodore	Goaltender	1	2001–02	2nd
J. C. Tremblay	Defence	2	1967–68	2nd
J. C. Tremblay	Defence	2	1970–71	1st
Gump Worsley	Goaltender	2	1965–66	2nd
Gump Worsley	Goaltender	2	1967–68	1st

=== NHL All-Rookie Team ===
The NHL All-Rookie Team consists of the top rookies at each position as voted on by the Professional Hockey Writers' Association.

Montreal Canadiens selected to the NHL All-Rookie Team
Player	Position	Season
Chris Chelios	Defence	1984–85
Kjell Dahlin	Forward	1985–86
Ivan Demidov	Forward	2025–26
Gilbert Dionne	Forward	1991–92
Jakub Dobes	Goaltender	2025–26
Brendan Gallagher	Forward	2012–13
Lane Hutson	Defence	2024–25
Mats Naslund	Forward	1982–83
Steve Penney	Goaltender	1984–85
Oleg Petrov	Forward	1993–94
Carey Price	Goaltender	2007–08
Patrick Roy	Goaltender	1985–86
Michael Ryder	Forward	2003–04
P. K. Subban	Defence	2010–11
Nick Suzuki	Forward	2019–20

=== All-Star Game selections ===
The National Hockey League All-Star Game is a mid-season exhibition game held annually between many of the top players of each season. Sixty-eight iterations have been held since 1947, with at least one player chosen to represent the Canadiens in each year except 2001. Collectively, the All-Star game has not been held across several years: 1979 and 1987 due to the Challenge Cup and Rendez-vous '87 series between the NHL and the Soviet national team, 1995, 2005, and 2013 as a result of league labour stoppages, 2006, 2010, 2014 and 2026 because of player involvement at the Winter Olympic Games, 2021 out of precautionary reasons from the COVID-19 pandemic, and 2025 when it was substituted by the 4 Nations Face-Off tournament. Montreal has hosted a record twelve NHL All-Star Games to date: 1953, 1956, 1957, 1958, 1959, 1960, 1965, 1967, 1969, 1975, 1993, and most recently in 2009.

- † Selected by fan vote
- ↑ All-Star Game Most Valuable Player

Montreal Canadiens players and coaches selected to the All-Star Game
Game	Year	Name	Position	References
1st	1947	Emile Bouchard	Defence	
1st	1947	Bill Durnan	Goaltender	
1st	1947	Dick Irvin	Coach	
1st	1947	Ken Reardon	Defence	
1st	1947	Maurice Richard	Right wing	
2nd	1948	Emile Bouchard	Defence	
2nd	1948	Bill Durnan	Goaltender	
2nd	1948	Elmer Lach	Centre	
2nd	1948	Ken Reardon	Defence	
2nd	1948	Maurice Richard	Right wing	
3rd	1949	Bill Durnan	Goaltender	
3rd	1949	Glen Harmon	Defence	
3rd	1949	Ken Reardon	Defence	
3rd	1949	Maurice Richard	Right wing	
4th	1950	Emile Bouchard	Defence	
4th	1950	Glen Harmon	Defence	
4th	1950	Maurice Richard	Right wing	
5th	1951	Emile Bouchard	Defence	
5th	1951	Floyd Curry	Right wing	
5th	1951	Doug Harvey	Defence	
5th	1951	Dick Irvin	Coach	
5th	1951	Gerry McNeil	Goaltender	
5th	1951	Paul Meger	Left wing	
5th	1951	Ken Mosdell	Centre	
5th	1951	Maurice Richard	Right wing	
6th	1952	Emile Bouchard	Defence	
6th	1952	Floyd Curry	Right wing	
6th	1952	Bernie Geoffrion	Right wing	
6th	1952	Doug Harvey	Defence	
6th	1952	Dick Irvin	Coach	
6th	1952	Tom Johnson	Defence	
6th	1952	Elmer Lach	Centre	
6th	1952	Gerry McNeil	Goaltender	
6th	1952	Paul Meger	Left wing	
6th	1952	Ken Mosdell	Centre	
6th	1952	Billy Reay	Centre	
6th	1952	Maurice Richard	Right wing	
7th	1953	Jean Beliveau	Centre	
7th	1953	Emile Bouchard	Defence	
7th	1953	Floyd Curry	Right wing	
7th	1953	Lorne Davis	Right wing	
7th	1953	Dick Gamble	Left wing	
7th	1953	Bernie Geoffrion	Right wing	
7th	1953	Doug Harvey	Defence	
7th	1953	Dick Irvin	Coach	
7th	1953	Tom Johnson	Defence	
7th	1953	Elmer Lach	Centre	
7th	1953	Calum MacKay	Left wing	
7th	1953	Bud MacPherson	Defence	
7th	1953	Eddie Mazur	Left wing	
7th	1953	John McCormack	Centre	
7th	1953	Gerry McNeil	Goaltender	
7th	1953	Paul Meger	Left wing	
7th	1953	Dickie Moore	Right wing	
7th	1953	Ken Mosdell	Centre	
7th	1953	Bert Olmstead	Left wing	
7th	1953	Maurice Richard	Right wing	
7th	1953	Dollard St. Laurent	Defence	
8th	1954	Jean Beliveau	Centre	
8th	1954	Bernie Geoffrion	Right wing	
8th	1954	Doug Harvey	Defence	
8th	1954	Ken Mosdell	Centre	
8th	1954	Maurice Richard	Right wing	
9th	1955	Jean Beliveau	Centre	
9th	1955	Bernie Geoffrion	Right wing	
9th	1955	Doug Harvey	Defence	
9th	1955	Ken Mosdell	Centre	
9th	1955	Maurice Richard	Right wing	
10th	1956	Jean Beliveau	Centre	
10th	1956	Toe Blake	Coach	
10th	1956	Floyd Curry	Right wing	
10th	1956	Bernie Geoffrion	Right wing	
10th	1956	Doug Harvey	Defence	
10th	1956	Tom Johnson	Defence	
10th	1956	Jack LeClair	Centre	
10th	1956	Donnie Marshall	Left wing	
10th	1956	Dickie Moore	Right wing	
10th	1956	Bert Olmstead	Left wing	
10th	1956	Jacques Plante	Goaltender	
10th	1956	Claude Provost	Right wing	
10th	1956	Henri Richard	Centre	
10th	1956	Maurice Richard	Right wing	
10th	1956	Dollard St. Laurent	Defence	
10th	1956	Jean-Guy Talbot	Defence	
10th	1956	Bob Turner	Defence	
11th	1957	Jean Beliveau	Centre	
11th	1957	Toe Blake	Coach	
11th	1957	Marcel Bonin	Left wing	
11th	1957	Floyd Curry	Right wing	
11th	1957	Phil Goyette	Centre	
11th	1957	Doug Harvey	Defence	
11th	1957	Tom Johnson	Defence	
11th	1957	Donnie Marshall	Left wing	
11th	1957	Dickie Moore	Right wing	
11th	1957	Bert Olmstead	Left wing	
11th	1957	Jacques Plante	Goaltender	
11th	1957	Andre Pronovost	Left wing	
11th	1957	Claude Provost	Right wing	
11th	1957	Henri Richard	Centre	
11th	1957	Maurice Richard	Right wing	
11th	1957	Dollard.St. Laurent	Defence	
11th	1957	Stan Smrke	Left wing	
11th	1957	Jean-Guy Talbot	Defence	
11th	1957	Bob Turner	Defence	
12th	1958	Ralph Backstrom	Centre	
12th	1958	Jean Beliveau	Centre	
12th	1958	Toe Blake	Coach	
12th	1958	Marcel Bonin	Left wing	
12th	1958	Ian Cushenan	Defence	
12th	1958	Bernie Geoffrion	Right wing	
12th	1958	Phil Goyette	Centre	
12th	1958	Doug Harvey	Defence	
12th	1958	Tom Johnson	Defence	
12th	1958	Donnie Marshall	Left wing	
12th	1958	Ab McDonald	Left wing	
12th	1958	Dickie Moore	Right wing	
12th	1958	Jacques Plante	Goaltender	
12th	1958	Andre Pronovost	Left wing	
12th	1958	Claude Provost	Right wing	
12th	1958	Henri Richard	Centre	
12th	1958	Maurice Richard	Right wing	
13th	1959	Ralph Backstrom	Centre	
13th	1959	Jean Beliveau	Centre	
13th	1959	Toe Blake	Coach	
13th	1959	Marcel Bonin	Left wing	
13th	1959	Bernie Geoffrion	Right wing	
13th	1959	Phil Goyette	Centre	
13th	1959	Harvey	Defence	
13th	1959	Bill Hicke	Right wing	
13th	1959	Tom Johnson	Defence	
13th	1959	Al Langlois	Defence	
13th	1959	Donnie Marshall	Left wing	
13th	1959	Ab McDonald	Left wing	
13th	1959	Dickie Moore	Right wing	
13th	1959	Jacques Plante	Goaltender	
13th	1959	Andre Pronovost	Left wing	
13th	1959	Claude Provost	Right wing	
13th	1959	Henri Richard	Centre	
13th	1959	Maurice Richard	Right wing	
13th	1959	J. C. Tremblay	Defence	
13th	1959	Bob Turner	Defence	
14th	1960	Ralph Backstrom	Centre	
14th	1960	Jean Beliveau	Centre	
14th	1960	Toe Blake	Coach	
14th	1960	Marcel Bonin	Left wing	
14th	1960	Bernie Geoffrion	Right wing	
14th	1960	Doug Harvey	Defence	
14th	1960	Bill Hicke	Right wing	
14th	1960	Tom Johnson	Defence	
14th	1960	Al Langlois	Defence	
14th	1960	Donnie Marshall	Left wing	
14th	1960	Dickie Moore	Right wing	
14th	1960	Jacques Plante	Goaltender	
14th	1960	Andre Pronovost	Left wing	
14th	1960	Claude Provost	Right wing	
14th	1960	Henri Richard	Centre	
14th	1960	Jean-Guy Talbot	Defence	
14th	1960	Bob Turner	Defence	
15th	1961	Bernie Geoffrion	Right wing	
15th	1961	Phil Goyette	Centre	
15th	1961	Donnie Marshall	Left wing	
15th	1961	Claude Provost	Right wing	
15th	1961	Henri Richard	Centre	
16th	1962	Ralph Backstrom	Centre	
16th	1962	Bernie Geoffrion	Right wing	
16th	1962	Jacques Plante	Goaltender	
16th	1962	Claude Provost	Right wing	
16th	1962	Jean-Guy Talbot	Defence	
17th	1963	Jean Beliveau	Centre	
17th	1963	Bernie Geoffrion	Right wing	
17th	1963	Claude Provost	Right wing	
17th	1963	Henri Richard	Centre	
18th	1964	Jean Beliveau	Centre	
18th	1964	Charlie Hodge	Goaltender	
18th	1964	Jacques Laperriere	Defence	
18th	1964	Claude Provost	Right wing	
19th	1965	Ralph Backstrom	Centre	
19th	1965	Dave Balon	Left wing	
19th	1965	Jean Beliveau	Centre	
19th	1965	Red Berenson	Centre	
19th	1965	Toe Blake	Coach	
19th	1965	Dick Duff	Left wing	
19th	1965	John Ferguson Sr.	Left wing	
19th	1965	Terry Harper	Defence	
19th	1965	Ted Harris	Defence	
19th	1965	Charlie Hodge	Goaltender	
19th	1965	Jacques Laperriere	Defence	
19th	1965	Claude Larose	Right wing	
19th	1965	Claude Provost	Right wing	
19th	1965	Henri Richard	Centre	
19th	1965	Jim Roberts	Right wing	
19th	1965	Bobby Rousseau	Right wing	
19th	1965	Jean-Guy Talbot	Defence	
19th	1965	Gilles Tremblay	Left wing	
19th	1965	J. C. Tremblay	Defence	
19th	1965	Gump Worsley	Goaltender	
20th	1967	Ralph Backstrom	Centre	
20th	1967	Dave Balon	Left wing	
20th	1967	Garry Bauman	Goaltender	
20th	1967	Toe Blake	Coach	
20th	1967	Andre Boudrias	Left wing	
20th	1967	Yvan Cournoyer	Right wing	
20th	1967	Dick Duff	Left wing	
20th	1967	John Ferguson Sr.	Left wing	
20th	1967	Terry Harper	Defence	
20th	1967	Ted Harris	Defence	
20th	1967	Charlie Hodge	Goaltender	
20th	1967	Jacques Laperriere	Defence	
20th	1967	Claude Larose	Right wing	
20th	1967	Noel Price	Defence	
20th	1967	Claude Provost	Right wing	
20th	1967	Henri Richard ↑	Centre	
20th	1967	Bobby Rousseau	Right wing	
20th	1967	Jean-Guy Talbot	Defence	
20th	1967	Gilles Tremblay	Left wing	
20th	1967	J. C. Tremblay	Defence	
21st	1968	Jean Beliveau	Centre	
21st	1968	Toe Blake	Coach	
21st	1968	Jacques Laperriere	Defence	
21st	1968	J. C. Tremblay	Defence	
22nd	1969	Jean Beliveau	Centre	
22nd	1969	Toe Blake	Coach	
22nd	1969	Ted Harris	Defence	
22nd	1969	Bobby Rousseau	Right wing	
22nd	1969	J. C. Tremblay	Defence	
23rd	1970	Jacques Laperriere	Defence	
23rd	1970	Jacques Lemaire	Defence	
23rd	1970	Claude Ruel	Coach	
23rd	1970	Serge Savard	Defence	
24th	1971	Yvan Cournoyer	Right wing	
24th	1971	Frank Mahovlich	Left wing	
24th	1971	Peter Mahovlich	Centre	
24th	1971	J. C. Tremblay	Defence	
25th	1972	Yvan Cournoyer	Right wing	
25th	1972	Ken Dryden	Goaltender	
25th	1972	Al MacNeil	Coach	
25th	1972	Frank Mahovlich	Left wing	
25th	1972	J. C. Tremblay	Defence	
26th	1973	Yvan Cournoyer	Right wing	
26th	1973	Guy Lapointe	Defence	
26th	1973	Jacques Lemaire	Defence	
26th	1973	Frank Mahovlich	Left wing	
26th	1973	Serge Savard	Defence	
27th	1974	Scotty Bowman	Coach	
27th	1974	Yvan Cournoyer	Right wing	
27th	1974	Frank Mahovlich	Left wing	
27th	1974	Henri Richard	Centre	
27th	1974	Larry Robinson	Defence	
28th	1975	Ken Dryden	Goaltender	
28th	1975	Guy Lafleur	Right wing	
28th	1975	Guy Lapointe	Defence	
29th	1976	Ken Dryden	Goaltender	
29th	1976	Guy Lafleur	Right wing	
29th	1976	Guy Lapointe	Defence	
29th	1976	Peter Mahovlich ↑	Centre	
29th	1976	Larry Robinson	Defence	
29th	1976	Steve Shutt	Left wing	
30th	1977	Scotty Bowman	Coach	
30th	1977	Ken Dryden	Goaltender	
30th	1977	Bob Gainey	Left wing	
30th	1977	Guy Lafleur	Right wing	
30th	1977	Guy Lapointe	Defence	
30th	1977	Larry Robinson	Defence	
30th	1977	Serge Savard	Defence	
31st	1978	Scotty Bowman	Coach	
31st	1978	Yvan Cournoyer	Right wing	
31st	1978	Ken Dryden	Goaltender	
31st	1978	Bob Gainey	Left wing	
31st	1978	Guy Lafleur	Right wing	
31st	1978	Larry Robinson	Defence	
31st	1978	Serge Savard	Defence	
31st	1978	Steve Shutt	Left wing	
32nd	1980	Bob Gainey	Left wing	
32nd	1980	Guy Lafleur	Right wing	
32nd	1980	Larry Robinson	Defence	
33rd	1981	Bob Gainey	Left wing	
33rd	1981	Rod Langway	Defence	
33rd	1981	Steve Shutt	Left wing	
34th	1982	Keith Acton	Centre	
34th	1982	Rod Langway	Defence	
34th	1982	Larry Robinson	Defence	
35th	1983	Ryan Walter	Centre	
36th	1984	Mats Naslund	Left wing	
37th	1985	Chris Chelios	Defence	
38th	1986	Mats Naslund	Left wing	
38th	1986	Larry Robinson	Defence	
39th	1988	Mats Naslund	Left wing	
39th	1988	Larry Robinson	Defence	
39th	1988	Patrick Roy	Goaltender	
40th	1989	Mike McPhee	Left wing	
40th	1989	Mats Naslund† (Did not play)	Left wing	
40th	1989	Larry Robinson	Defence	
40th	1989	Bobby Smith	Centre	
41st	1990	Pat Burns	Coach	
41st	1990	Chris Chelios	Defence	
41st	1990	Shayne Corson	Centre	
41st	1990	Stephane Richer	Right wing	
41st	1990	Patrick Roy †	Goaltender	
42nd	1991	Patrick Roy †	Goaltender	
42nd	1991	Denis Savard	Centre	
42nd	1991	Brian Skrudland (Did not play)	Centre	
43rd	1992	Eric Desjardins	Defence	
43rd	1992	Kirk Muller	Left wing	
43rd	1992	Patrick Roy †	Goaltender	
44th	1993	Kirk Muller	Centre	
44th	1993	Patrick Roy †	Goaltender	
45th	1994	Jacques Demers	Coach	
45th	1994	Patrick Roy †	Goaltender	
46th	1996	Pierre Turgeon	Centre	
47th	1997	Mark Recchi ↑	Right wing	
48th	1998	Shayne Corson	Left wing	
48th	1998	Saku Koivu	Centre	
48th	1998	Mark Recchi	Right wing	
49th	1999	Mark Recchi	Right wing	
50th	2000	Martin Rucinsky	Left wing	
51st	2001	No Canadiens selected	—	
52nd	2002	Jose Theodore	Goaltender	
53rd	2003	Saku Koivu (Did not play)	Centre	
54th	2004	Sheldon Souray	Defence	
54th	2004	Jose Theodore	Goaltender	
55th	2007	Cristobal Huet	Goaltender	
55th	2007	Sheldon Souray†	Defence	
56th	2008	Andrei Markov†	Defence	
57th	2009	Guy Carbonneau	Assistant coach	
57th	2009	Mike Komisarek†	Defence	
57th	2009	Alexei Kovalev†↑	Right wing	
57th	2009	Andrei Markov †	Defence	
57th	2009	Carey Price†	Goaltender	
58th	2011	Carey Price	Goaltender	
59th	2012	Carey Price	Goaltender	
60th	2015	Carey Price	Goaltender	
61st	2016	P. K. Subban	Defence	
62nd	2017	Carey Price†	Goaltender	
62nd	2017	Michel Therrien	Coach	
62nd	2017	Shea Weber	Defence	
63rd	2018	Carey Price	Goaltender	
64th	2019	Carey Price (Did not play)	Goaltender	
65th	2020	Shea Weber	Defence	
66th	2022	Nick Suzuki	Centre	
67th	2023	Nick Suzuki	Centre	
68th	2024	Nick Suzuki	Centre	

=== All-Star benefit games ===
Prior to the institution of the National Hockey League All-Star Game the league held three different benefit games featuring teams of all-stars. The first was the Ace Bailey Benefit Game, held in 1934, after a violent collision with Eddie Shore of the Boston Bruins left Ace Bailey of the Toronto Maple Leafs hospitalized and unable to continue his playing career. In 1937, the Howie Morenz Memorial Game was held to raise money for the family of Howie Morenz of the Canadiens, who died from complications after being admitted to the hospital for a broken leg. The Babe Siebert Memorial Game was held in 1939 to raise funds for the family of the Canadiens' Babe Siebert, who drowned shortly after his retirement from professional hockey.

Montreal Canadiens players and coaches selected to All-Star benefit games
Game	Year	Name	Position	References
Ace Bailey Benefit Game	1934	Aurele Joliat	Left wing	
Ace Bailey Benefit Game	1934	Howie Morenz	Centre	
Howie Morenz Memorial Game	1937	Toe Blake	Left wing	
Howie Morenz Memorial Game	1937	Walter Buswell	Defence	
Howie Morenz Memorial Game	1937	Wilf Cude	Goaltender	
Howie Morenz Memorial Game	1937	Johnny Gagnon	Right wing	
Howie Morenz Memorial Game	1937	Cecil Hart	Coach	
Howie Morenz Memorial Game	1937	Paul Haynes	Centre	
Howie Morenz Memorial Game	1937	Aurele Joliat	Left wing	
Howie Morenz Memorial Game	1937	Alfred Lepine	Centre	
Howie Morenz Memorial Game	1937	Georges Mantha	Left wing	
Howie Morenz Memorial Game	1937	Babe Siebert	Defence	
Babe Siebert Memorial Game	1939	Toe Blake	Left wing	
Babe Siebert Memorial Game	1939	Walter Buswell	Defence	
Babe Siebert Memorial Game	1939	Wilf Cude	Goaltender	
Babe Siebert Memorial Game	1939	Polly Drouin	Centre	
Babe Siebert Memorial Game	1939	Johnny Gagnon	Right wing	
Babe Siebert Memorial Game	1939	Ray Getliffe	Centre	
Babe Siebert Memorial Game	1939	Cliff Goupille	Defence	
Babe Siebert Memorial Game	1939	Paul Haynes	Centre	
Babe Siebert Memorial Game	1939	Alfred Lepine	Coach	
Babe Siebert Memorial Game	1939	Rod Lorrain	Right wing	
Babe Siebert Memorial Game	1939	Georges Mantha	Left wing	
Babe Siebert Memorial Game	1939	Armand Mondou	Left wing	
Babe Siebert Memorial Game	1939	Earl Robinson	Right wing	
Babe Siebert Memorial Game	1939	Louis Trudel	Left wing	
Babe Siebert Memorial Game	1939	Marvin Wentworth	Defence	
Babe Siebert Memorial Game	1939	Doug Young	Defence	

=== All-Star Game replacement events ===
Montreal Canadiens players and coaches selected to All-Star Game replacement events
Event	Year	Name	Position	References
Challenge Cup	1979	Scotty Bowman	Coach	
Challenge Cup	1979	Ken Dryden	Goaltender	
Challenge Cup	1979	Bob Gainey	Left wing	
Challenge Cup	1979	Guy Lafleur	Right wing	
Challenge Cup	1979	Guy Lapointe	Defence	
Challenge Cup	1979	Larry Robinson	Defence	
Challenge Cup	1979	Claude Ruel	Assistant coach	
Challenge Cup	1979	Serge Savard	Defence	
Challenge Cup	1979	Steve Shutt	Left wing	
Rendez-vous '87	1987	Chris Chelios	Defence	
Rendez-vous '87	1987	Claude Lemieux	Right wing	
Rendez-vous '87	1987	Jean Perron	Coach	
4 Nations Face-Off	2025	Joel Armia (Finland)	Right wing	
4 Nations Face-Off	2025	Patrik Laine (Finland)	Right wing	
4 Nations Face-Off	2025	Sam Montembeault (Canada)	Goaltender	

== Career achievements ==
=== Hockey Hall of Fame ===
In the Hockey Hall of Fame, the Canadiens boast the most enshrined members with 71. All of their inductees are from Canada save for former defencemen Joe Hall (United Kingdom) and Chris Chelios (United States). Thirty-six of these players are from three separate notable dynasties: 12 from 1955–60, 11 from 1964–69 and 13 from 1975–79. Howie Morenz and Georges Vezina were the first Canadiens given the honour in 1945, while Carey Price was the most recent inductee in 2026.

- † Not included in Ring of Honour exhibit.

Montreal Canadiens inducted into the Hockey Hall of Fame
Individual	Category	Year inducted	Years with Canadiens in category	References
Marty Barry†	Player	1965	1939–1940	
Jean Beliveau	Player	1972	1950–1951, 1952–1971	
Toe Blake	Player	1966	1935–1948	
Emile Bouchard	Player	1966	1941–1956	
Scotty Bowman	Builder	1991	1971–1979	
Pat Burns	Builder	2014	1988–1992	
Harry Cameron†	Player	1962	1919–1920	
Guy Carbonneau	Player	2019	1981–1994	
Joseph Cattarinich	Builder	1977	1921–1935	
Chris Chelios	Player	2013	1984–1990	
Sprague Cleghorn	Player	1958	1921–1925	
Yvan Cournoyer	Player	1982	1963–1979	
Leo Dandurand	Builder	1963	1921–1935	
Gordie Drillon†	Player	1975	1942–1943	
Ken Dryden	Player	1983	1970–1973, 1974–1979	
Dick Duff	Player	2006	1964–1970	
Bill Durnan	Player	1964	1943–1950	
Tony Esposito†	Player	1988	1968–1969	
Bob Gainey	Player	1992	1974–1989	
Herb Gardiner	Player	1958	1926–1929	
Jimmy Gardner†	Player	1962	1913–1915	
Bernard Geoffrion	Player	1972	1950–1964	
Doug Gilmour†	Player	2011	2001–2003	
Tommy Gorman	Builder	1963	1940–1946	
George Hainsworth	Player	1961	1926–1933, 1936–1937	
Joe Hall	Player	1961	1917–1919	
Doug Harvey	Player	1973	1947–1961	
Tom Johnson	Player	1970	1947–1948, 1949–1963	
Aurele Joliat	Player	1947	1922–1938	
Elmer Lach	Player	1966	1940–1954	
Guy Lafleur	Player	1988	1971–1985	
Newsy Lalonde	Player	1950	1909–1911, 1912–1922	
Rod Langway	Player	2002	1978–1982	
Jacques Laperriere	Player	1987	1963–1974	
Guy Lapointe	Player	1993	1968–1982	
Jack Laviolette	Player	1962	1909–1918	
Jacques Lemaire	Player	1984	1967–1979	
Frank Mahovlich	Player	1981	1970–1974	
Joe Malone	Player	1950	1917–1919, 1922–1924	
Sylvio Mantha	Player	1960	1923–1936	
Hartland Molson	Builder	1973	1957–1968	
Dickie Moore	Player	1974	1951–1963	
Howie Morenz	Player	1945	1923–1934, 1936–1937	
Reg Noble†	Player	1962	1916–1917	
William Northey	Builder	1947	1912–1946	
Ambrose O'Brien	Builder	1962	1909–1910	
Buddy O'Connor	Player	1988	1941–1947	
Bert Olmstead	Player	1985	1950–1958	
Didier Pitre	Player	1962	1910–1913, 1914–1923	
Jacques Plante	Player	1978	1952–1963	
Carey Price	Player	2026	2007–2022	
Sam Pollock	Builder	1978	1959–1978	
Donat Raymond	Builder	1958	1940–1957	
Ken Reardon	Player	1966	1940–1942, 1945–1950	
Mark Recchi	Player	2017	1995–1999	
Henri Richard	Player	1979	1955–1975	
Maurice Richard	Player	1961	1942–1960	
Larry Robinson	Player	1995	1972–1989	
Patrick Roy	Player	2006	1984–1996	
Denis Savard	Player	2000	1990–1993	
Serge Savard	Player	1986	1966–1981	
Frank J. Selke	Builder	1960	1946–1964	
Steve Shutt	Player	1993	1972–1985	
Babe Siebert	Player	1964	1936–1939	
Tommy Smith†	Player	1973	1916–1917	
Pierre Turgeon	Player	2023	1995–1996	
Rogie Vachon	Player	2016	1966–1971	
Georges Vezina	Player	1945	1910–1926	
Shea Weber	Player	2024	2016–2021	
Gump Worsley	Player	1980	1963–1970	
Roy Worters†	Player	1969	1929–1930	

=== Foster Hewitt Memorial Award ===
Seven members of the Canadiens organization have been honoured with the Foster Hewitt Memorial Award. The award is presented by the Hockey Hall of Fame to members of the radio and television industry who make outstanding contributions to their profession and the game of ice hockey during their broadcasting career.

Members of the Montreal Canadiens honoured with the Foster Hewitt Memorial Award
Individual	Year honoured	Years with Canadiens as broadcaster	References
Danny Gallivan	1984	1952–1984	
Richard Garneau	1999	1957–1989	
Pierre Houde	2024	1989–present	
Dick Irvin Jr.	1988	1966–1997	
Rene Lecavalier	1984	1952–1985	
Doug Smith	1985	1937–1955	
Gilles Tremblay	2002	1971–1997	

=== Retired numbers ===
The Montreal Canadiens have retired fifteen of their jersey numbers. Also out of circulation is the number 99, which was retired league-wide for Wayne Gretzky on February 6, 2000. Gretzky did not play for the Canadiens during his 20-year NHL career and the only Canadiens to wear the number prior to its retirement were Joe Lamb, Des Roche and Leo Bourgeault during the 1934–35 season.

Montreal Canadiens retired numbers
Number	Player	Position	Years with Canadiens as a player	Date of retirement ceremony	References
1	Jacques Plante	Goaltender	1952–1963	October 7, 1995	
2	Doug Harvey	Defence	1947–1961	October 26, 1985	
3	Emile Bouchard	Defence	1941–1956	December 4, 2009	
4	Jean Beliveau	Centre	1950–1951, 1952–1971	October 9, 1971	
5	Bernie Geoffrion	Right wing	1950–1964	March 11, 2006	
5	Guy Lapointe	Defence	1968–1982	November 8, 2014	
7	Howie Morenz	Centre	1923–1934, 1936–1937	November 2, 1937	
9	Maurice Richard	Right wing	1942–1960	October 6, 1960	
10	Guy Lafleur	Right wing	1971–1985	February 16, 1985	
12	Yvan Cournoyer	Right wing	1963–1979	November 12, 2005	
12	Dickie Moore	Left wing	1951–1963	November 12, 2005	
16	Elmer Lach	Centre	1940–1954	December 4, 2009	
16	Henri Richard	Centre	1955–1975	December 10, 1975	
18	Serge Savard	Defence	1966–1981	November 18, 2006	
19	Larry Robinson	Defence	1972–1989	November 19, 2007	
23	Bob Gainey	Left wing	1974–1989	February 23, 2008	
29	Ken Dryden	Goaltender	1970–1973, 1974–1979	January 29, 2007	
33	Patrick Roy	Goaltender	1984–1996	November 22, 2008	

== Team awards ==
=== Jacques Beauchamp Molson Trophy ===
The Jacques Beauchamp Molson Trophy is an award given to the player "who played a dominant role during the regular season, without obtaining any particular honor" as determined by the local media. It is named in honour of long-time reporter Jacques Beauchamp.

Season	Winner
1981–82	Doug Jarvis
1982–83	Craig Ludwig
1983–84	Jean Hamel
1984–85	Craig Ludwig
1985–86	Craig Ludwig
1986–87	Rick Green
1987–88	Mike McPhee
1988–89	Petr Svoboda
1989–90	Mike McPhee
1990–91	Mike McPhee
1991–92	Brent Gilchrist
1992–93	Mike Keane
1993–94	Lyle Odelein

Season	Winner
1994–95	Benoit Brunet
1995–96	Peter Popovic
1996–97	Stephane Quintal
1997–98	Patrice Brisebois
1997–98	Marc Bureau
1998–99	Benoit Brunet
1999–00	Eric Weinrich
2000–01	Oleg Petrov
2001–02	Joe Juneau
2002–03	Jan Bulis
2003–04	Francis Bouillon
2005–06	Steve Begin
2006–07	Mark Streit

Season	Winner
2007–08	Mark Streit
2008–09	Maxim Lapierre
2009–10	Josh Gorges
2010–11	Roman Hamrlik
2011–12	Josh Gorges
2012–13	Brandon Prust
2013–14	Brian Gionta
2014–15	Dale Weise
2015–16	Paul Byron
2016–17	Phillip Danault
2017–18	Paul Byron
2018–19	Phillip Danault
2019–20	Not Awarded

Season	Winner
2020–21	Jake Allen
2021–22	Alexander Romanov
2022–23	David Savard
2023–24	David Savard
2024–25	Josh Anderson
2025–26	Mike Matheson

=== Molson Cup ===
The Molson Cup is an award given to the player who earns the most points from three-star selections during the regular season.

Season	Winner
1972–73	Ken Dryden
1973–74	Wayne Thomas
1974–75	Guy Lafleur
1975–76	Guy Lafleur
1976–77	Guy Lafleur
1977–78	Guy Lafleur
1978–79	Guy Lafleur
1979–80	Guy Lafleur
1980–81	Larry Robinson
1981–82	Guy Lafleur
1982–83	Mario Tremblay
1983–84	Guy Carbonneau
1984–85	Steve Penney
1985–86	Mats Naslund
1986–87	Mats Naslund
1987–88	Stephane Richer

Season	Winner
1988–89	Patrick Roy
1989–90	Stephane Richer
1990–91	Russ Courtnall
1991–92	Patrick Roy
1992–93	Kirk Muller
1993–94	Patrick Roy
1994–95	Patrick Roy
1995–96	Pierre Turgeon
1996–97	Mark Recchi
1997–98	Mark Recchi
1998–99	Jeff Hackett
1999–00	Jeff Hackett
2000–01	Jose Theodore
2001–02	Jose Theodore
2002–03	Jose Theodore
2003–04	Jose Theodore

Season	Winner
2005–06	Saku Koivu
2006–07	Cristobal Huet
2007–08	Alexei Kovalev
2008–09	Carey Price
2009–10	Jaroslav Halak
2010–11	Carey Price
2011–12	Carey Price
2012–13	Carey Price
2013–14	Carey Price
2014–15	Carey Price
2015–16	Alex Galchenyuk
2016–17	Carey Price
2017–18	Brendan Gallagher
2018–19	Carey Price
2019–20	Carey Price
2021–22	Nick Suzuki

Season	Winner
2022–23	Nick Suzuki
2023–24	Nick Suzuki
2024–25	Nick Suzuki

== Other awards ==
Montreal Canadiens who have received non-NHL awards
Award	Description	Winner	Year	References
Charlie Conacher Humanitarian Award	For humanitarian or community service projects	Jean Beliveau	1970–71	
Lionel Conacher Award	Canada's male athlete of the year	Maurice Richard	1952	
Lionel Conacher Award	Canada's male athlete of the year	Maurice Richard	1957	
Lionel Conacher Award	Canada's male athlete of the year	Maurice Richard	1958	
Lionel Conacher Award	Canada's male athlete of the year	Jean Beliveau	1956	
Lionel Conacher Award	Canada's male athlete of the year	Guy Lafleur	1977	
Lionel Conacher Award	Canada's male athlete of the year	Carey Price	2015	
Lou Marsh Trophy	Canada's top athlete	Maurice Richard	1957	
Lou Marsh Trophy	Canada's top athlete	Guy Lafleur	1977	
Lou Marsh Trophy	Canada's top athlete	Carey Price	2015	
Viking Award	Most valuable Swedish player in NHL	Mats Naslund	1984–85	
Viking Award	Most valuable Swedish player in NHL	Mats Naslund	1985–86	

== See also ==
- List of National Hockey League awards
