= List of St. Louis Blues award winners =

St. Louis Blues awards
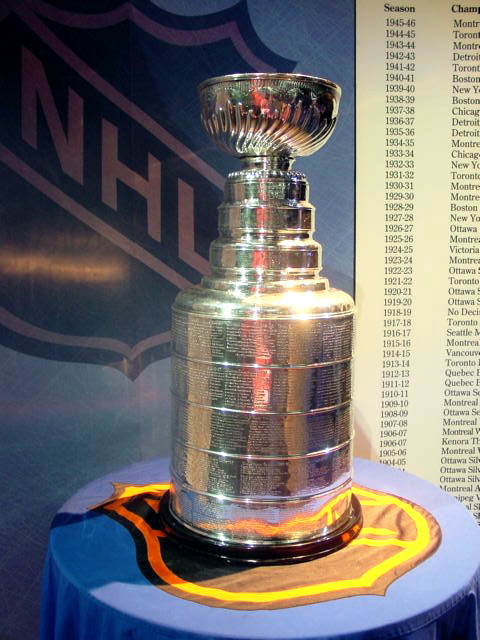
- The St. Louis Blues have won the Stanley Cup (above) one time.

Team trophies
- Award*: Wins
- Stanley Cup: 1
- Clarence S. Campbell Bowl: 3
- Presidents' Trophy: 1

Individual awards
- Award*: Wins
- Bill Masterton Memorial Trophy: 2
- Calder Memorial Trophy: 1
- Charlie Conacher Memorial Trophy: 2
- Conn Smythe Trophy: 2
- Frank J. Selke Trophy: 2
- General Manager of the Year Award: 1
- Hart Memorial Trophy: 2
- Jack Adams Award: 4
- James Norris Memorial Trophy: 2
- King Clancy Memorial Trophy: 1
- Lady Byng Memorial Trophy: 3
- Lester Patrick Trophy: 4
- NHL Foundation Player Award: 1
- NHL Plus-Minus Award: 3
- Ted Lindsay Award: 2
- Vezina Trophy: 1
- William M. Jennings Trophy: 2

Total
- Awards won: 40

This is a list of St. Louis Blues award winners.

== League awards ==
=== Team trophies ===
Team trophies awarded to the St. Louis Blues
| Award | Description | Times won | Seasons | References |
|---|---|---|---|---|
| Stanley Cup | NHL championship | 1 | 2018–19 | |
| Clarence S. Campbell Bowl | West Division champions (1967–74) | 2 | 1968–69, 1969–70 | |
| Clarence S. Campbell Bowl | Campbell/Western Conference playoff championship (1981–present) | 1 | 2018–19 | |
| Presidents' Trophy | Most regular season points | 1 | 1999–2000 | |

=== Individual awards ===
Individual awards won by St. Louis Blues players and staff
| Award | Description | Winner | Season | References |
|---|---|---|---|---|
| Bill Masterton Memorial Trophy | Perseverance, sportsmanship and dedication to hockey | Blake Dunlop | 1980–81 | |
| Bill Masterton Memorial Trophy | Perseverance, sportsmanship and dedication to hockey | Jamie McLennan | 1997–98 | |
| Calder Memorial Trophy | Rookie of the year | Barret Jackman | 2002–03 | |
| Conn Smythe Trophy | Most valuable player of the playoffs | Glenn Hall | 1967–68 | |
| Conn Smythe Trophy | Most valuable player of the playoffs | Ryan O'Reilly | 2018–19 | |
| Frank J. Selke Trophy | Forward who best excels in the defensive aspect of the game | Rick Meagher | 1989–90 | |
| Frank J. Selke Trophy | Forward who best excels in the defensive aspect of the game | Ryan O'Reilly | 2018–19 | |
| General Manager of the Year Award | Top general manager | Doug Armstrong | 2011–12 | |
| Hart Memorial Trophy | Most valuable player to his team during the regular season | Brett Hull | 1990–91 | |
| Hart Memorial Trophy | Most valuable player to his team during the regular season | Chris Pronger | 1999–2000 | |
| Jack Adams Award | Top coach during the regular season | Red Berenson | 1980–81 | |
| Jack Adams Award | Top coach during the regular season | Brian Sutter | 1990–91 | |
| Jack Adams Award | Top coach during the regular season | Joel Quenneville | 1999–2000 | |
| Jack Adams Award | Top coach during the regular season | Ken Hitchcock | 2011–12 | |
| James Norris Memorial Trophy | Top defenseman during the regular season | Al MacInnis | 1998–99 | |
| James Norris Memorial Trophy | Top defenseman during the regular season | Chris Pronger | 1999–2000 | |
| King Clancy Memorial Trophy | Leadership qualities on and off the ice and humanitarian contributions within their community | Kelly Chase | 1997–98 | |
| Lady Byng Memorial Trophy | Gentlemanly conduct | Phil Goyette | 1969–70 | |
| Lady Byng Memorial Trophy | Gentlemanly conduct | Brett Hull | 1989–90 | |
| Lady Byng Memorial Trophy | Gentlemanly conduct | Pavol Demitra | 1999–2000 | |
| NHL Foundation Player Award | Community service | Kelly Chase | 1997–98 | |
| NHL Plus-Minus Award | Highest plus/minus | Paul Cavallini | 1989–90 | |
| NHL Plus-Minus Award | Highest plus/minus | Chris Pronger | 1997–98 | |
| NHL Plus-Minus Award | Highest plus/minus | Chris Pronger | 1999–2000 | |
| Ted Lindsay Award | Most valuable player as chosen by the players | Mike Liut | 1980–81 | |
| Ted Lindsay Award | Most valuable player as chosen by the players | Brett Hull | 1990–91 | |
| Vezina Trophy | Fewest goals given up in the regular season (1927–81) | Glenn Hall | 1968–69 | |
| Vezina Trophy | Fewest goals given up in the regular season (1927–81) | Jacques Plante | 1968–69 | |
| William M. Jennings Trophy | Fewest goals given up in the regular season (1981–present) | Roman Turek | 2000–01 | |
| William M. Jennings Trophy | Fewest goals given up in the regular season (1981–present) | Brian Elliott | 2011–12 | |
| William M. Jennings Trophy | Fewest goals given up in the regular season (1981–present) | Jaroslav Halak | 2011–12 | |

== All-Stars ==
=== NHL first and second team All-Stars ===
The NHL first and second team All-Stars are the top players at each position as voted on by the Professional Hockey Writers' Association.

St. Louis Blues selected to the NHL First and Second Team All-Stars
| Player | Position | Selections | Season | Team |
|---|---|---|---|---|
| Glenn Hall | Goaltender | 1 | 1968–69 | 1st |
| Brett Hull | Right wing | 3 | 1989–90 | 1st |
| Brett Hull | Right wing | 3 | 1990–91 | 1st |
| Brett Hull | Right wing | 3 | 1991–92 | 1st |
| Mike Liut | Goaltender | 1 | 1980–81 | 1st |
| Al MacInnis | Defense | 2 | 1998–99 | 1st |
| Al MacInnis | Defense | 2 | 2002–03 | 1st |
| Adam Oates | Center | 1 | 1990–91 | 2nd |
| Alex Pietrangelo | Defense | 3 | 2011–12 | 2nd |
| Alex Pietrangelo | Defense | 3 | 2013–14 | 2nd |
| Alex Pietrangelo | Defense | 3 | 2019–20 | 2nd |
| Chris Pronger | Defense | 3 | 1997–98 | 2nd |
| Chris Pronger | Defense | 3 | 1999–2000 | 1st |
| Chris Pronger | Defense | 3 | 2003–04 | 2nd |
| Brendan Shanahan | Left wing | 1 | 1993–94 | 1st |
| Vladimir Tarasenko | Right wing | 2 | 2014–15 | 2nd |
| Vladimir Tarasenko | Right wing | 2 | 2015–16 | 2nd |
| Roman Turek | Goaltender | 1 | 1999–2000 | 2nd |

=== NHL All-Rookie Team ===
The NHL All-Rookie Team consists of the top rookies at each position as voted on by the Professional Hockey Writers' Association.

St. Louis Blues selected to the NHL All-Rookie Team
| Player | Position | Season |
|---|---|---|
| Jake Allen | Goaltender | 2012–13 |
| Jake Allen | Goaltender | 2014–15 |
| Brian Benning | Defense | 1986–87 |
| Patrik Berglund | Forward | 2008–09 |
| Jordan Binnington | Goaltender | 2018–19 |
| Rod Brind'Amour | Forward | 1989–90 |
| Jim Campbell | Forward | 1996–97 |
| Barret Jackman | Defense | 2002–03 |
| Colton Parayko | Defense | 2015–16 |
| Jimmy Snuggerud | Forward | 2025–26 |

=== All-Star Game selections ===
The National Hockey League All-Star Game is a mid-season exhibition game held annually between many of the top players of each season. Forty-four All-Star Games have been held since the Blues entered the league in 1967, with at least one player chosen to represent the Blues in each year. The All-Star game has not been held in various years: 1979 and 1987 due to the 1979 Challenge Cup and Rendez-vous '87 series between the NHL and the Soviet national team, respectively, 1995, 2005, and 2013 as a result of labor stoppages, 2006, 2010, 2014 and 2026 because of the Winter Olympic Games, 2021 as a result of the COVID-19 pandemic, and 2025 when it was replaced by the 2025 4 Nations Face-Off. St. Louis has hosted three of the games. The 23rd and 39th took place at St. Louis Arena, and the 2020 edition was held at the Enterprise Center.

- † Selected by fan vote
- # Selected as one of four "last men in" by fan vote
- ‡ Selected by Commissioner
- ↑ All-Star Game Most Valuable Player

St. Louis Blues players and coaches selected to the All-Star Game
| Game | Year | Name | Position | References |
|---|---|---|---|---|
| 21st | 1968 | Glenn Hall | Goaltender | |
| 22nd | 1969 | Al Arbour | Defense | |
| 22nd | 1969 | Red Berenson | Center | |
| 22nd | 1969 | Scotty Bowman | Coach | |
| 22nd | 1969 | Glenn Hall | Goaltender | |
| 22nd | 1969 | Doug Harvey | Defense | |
| 22nd | 1969 | Ab McDonald | Left wing | |
| 22nd | 1969 | Noel Picard | Defense | |
| 22nd | 1969 | Jacques Plante | Goaltender | |
| 22nd | 1969 | Jim Roberts | Right wing | |
| 23rd | 1970 | Red Berenson | Center | |
| 23rd | 1970 | Scotty Bowman | Coach | |
| 23rd | 1970 | Phil Goyette (Did not play) | Center | |
| 23rd | 1970 | Glenn Hall (Did not play) | Goaltender | |
| 23rd | 1970 | Ab McDonald (Did not play) | Left wing | |
| 23rd | 1970 | Barclay Plager | Defense | |
| 23rd | 1970 | Jacques Plante | Goaltender | |
| 23rd | 1970 | Jim Roberts | Right wing | |
| 23rd | 1970 | Gary Sabourin | Right wing | |
| 23rd | 1970 | Frank St. Marseille | Right wing | |
| 24th | 1971 | Red Berenson | Center | |
| 24th | 1971 | Scotty Bowman | Coach | |
| 24th | 1971 | Tim Ecclestone | Left wing | |
| 24th | 1971 | Barclay Plager | Defense | |
| 24th | 1971 | Gary Sabourin | Right wing | |
| 24th | 1971 | Ernie Wakely | Goaltender | |
| 25th | 1972 | Garry Unger | Center | |
| 26th | 1973 | Barclay Plager | Defense | |
| 26th | 1973 | Garry Unger | Center | |
| 27th | 1974 | Don Awrey | Defense | |
| 27th | 1974 | Barclay Plager | Defense | |
| 27th | 1974 | Garry Unger↑ | Center | |
| 28th | 1975 | Garry Unger | Center | |
| 29th | 1976 | Garry Unger | Center | |
| 30th | 1977 | Garry Unger | Center | |
| 31st | 1978 | Garry Unger | Center | |
| 32nd | 1980 | Bernie Federko | Center | |
| 33rd | 1981 | Wayne Babych | Right wing | |
| 33rd | 1981 | Bernie Federko | Center | |
| 33rd | 1981 | Mike Liut↑ | Goaltender | |
| 34th | 1982 | Brian Sutter | Left wing | |
| 35th | 1983 | Brian Sutter | Left wing | |
| 36th | 1984 | Rob Ramage | Defense | |
| 37th | 1985 | Brian Sutter | Left wing | |
| 38th | 1986 | Mark Hunter | Right wing | |
| 38th | 1986 | Rob Ramage | Defense | |
| 39th | 1988 | Rob Ramage | Defense | |
| 40th | 1989 | Brett Hull | Right wing | |
| 41st | 1990 | Paul Cavallini | Defense | |
| 41st | 1990 | Brett Hull† | Right wing | |
| 42nd | 1991 | Brett Hull† (Did not play) | Right wing | |
| 42nd | 1991 | Adam Oates | Center | |
| 42nd | 1991 | Scott Stevens | Defense | |
| 43rd | 1992 | Brett Hull†↑ | Right wing | |
| 43rd | 1992 | Adam Oates | Center | |
| 44th | 1993 | Jeff Brown (Did not play) | Defense | |
| 44th | 1993 | Garth Butcher | Defense | |
| 44th | 1993 | Brett Hull† | Right wing | |
| 45th | 1994 | Brett Hull† | Right wing | |
| 45th | 1994 | Curtis Joseph | Goaltender | |
| 45th | 1994 | Brendan Shanahan | Left wing | |
| 46th | 1996 | Brett Hull† | Right wing | |
| 46th | 1996 | Al MacInnis | Defense | |
| 47th | 1997 | Brett Hull† | Right wing | |
| 47th | 1997 | Al MacInnis | Defense | |
| 48th | 1998 | Al MacInnis‡ | Defense | |
| 49th | 1999 | Pavol Demitra | Left wing | |
| 49th | 1999 | Al MacInnis† | Defense | |
| 49th | 1999 | Chris Pronger | Defense | |
| 50th | 2000 | Pavol Demitra | Right wing | |
| 50th | 2000 | Al MacInnis | Defense | |
| 50th | 2000 | Chris Pronger† | Defense | |
| 50th | 2000 | Roman Turek (Subbed for Dominik Hasek) | Goaltender | |
| 50th | 2000 | Pierre Turgeon (Did not play) | Center | |
| 51st | 2001 | Al MacInnis (Did not play) | Defense | |
| 51st | 2001 | Joel Quenneville | Coach | |
| 51st | 2001 | Chris Pronger† (Did not play) | Defense | |
| 52nd | 2002 | Pavol Demitra | Left wing | |
| 52nd | 2002 | Chris Pronger† | Defense | |
| 53rd | 2003 | Al MacInnis | Defense | |
| 53rd | 2003 | Doug Weight | Center | |
| 54th | 2004 | Chris Pronger | Defense | |
| 54th | 2004 | Keith Tkachuk | Left wing | |
| 55th | 2007 | Bill Guerin | Right wing | |
| 56th | 2008 | Manny Legace | Goaltender | |
| 57th | 2009 | Keith Tkachuk | Left wing | |
| 58th | 2011 | David Backes | Right wing | |
| 59th | 2012 | Brian Elliott | Goaltender | |
| 60th | 2015 | Brian Elliott | Goaltender | |
| 60th | 2015 | Kevin Shattenkirk | Defense | |
| 60th | 2015 | Vladimir Tarasenko | Right wing | |
| 61st | 2016 | Vladimir Tarasenko | Right wing | |
| 62nd | 2017 | Vladimir Tarasenko | Right wing | |
| 63rd | 2018 | Alex Pietrangelo | Defense | |
| 63rd | 2018 | Brayden Schenn | Center | |
| 64th | 2019 | Ryan O'Reilly | Center | |
| 65th | 2020 | Craig Berube | Coach | |
| 65th | 2020 | Jordan Binnington | Goaltender | |
| 65th | 2020 | Ryan O'Reilly | Center | |
| 65th | 2020 | David Perron# | Left wing | |
| 65th | 2020 | Alex Pietrangelo | Defense | |
| 66th | 2022 | Jordan Kyrou | Center | |
| 67th | 2023 | Vladimir Tarasenko | Right wing | |
| 68th | 2024 | Robert Thomas | Center | |

=== All-Star Game replacement events ===
St. Louis Blues players and coaches selected to All-Star Game replacement events
| Event | Year | Name | Position | References |
|---|---|---|---|---|
| 4 Nations Face-Off | 2025 | Jordan Binnington (Canada) | Goaltender | |
| 4 Nations Face-Off | 2025 | Colton Parayko (Canada) | Defense | |

== Career achievements ==
=== Hockey Hall of Fame ===
The following is a list of St. Louis Blues who have been enshrined in the Hockey Hall of Fame.

St. Louis Blues inducted into the Hockey Hall of Fame
| Individual | Category | Year inducted | Years with Blues in category | References |
|---|---|---|---|---|
| Glenn Anderson | Player | 2008 | 1994–1995, 1996 | |
| Al Arbour | Builder | 1996 | 1970–1972 | |
| Tom Barrasso | Player | 2023 | 2002 | |
| Scotty Bowman | Builder | 1991 | 1967–1971 | |
| Martin Brodeur | Player | 2018 | 2014–2015 | |
| Guy Carbonneau | Player | 2019 | 1995 | |
| Bernie Federko | Player | 2002 | 1976–1989 | |
| Cliff Fletcher | Builder | 2004 | 1966–1972 | |
| Emile Francis | Builder | 1982 | 1976–1983 | |
| Grant Fuhr | Player | 2003 | 1995–1999 | |
| Doug Gilmour | Player | 2011 | 1983–1988 | |
| Wayne Gretzky | Player | 1999 | 1996 | |
| Glenn Hall | Player | 1975 | 1967–1971 | |
| Doug Harvey | Player | 1973 | 1968–1969 | |
| Dale Hawerchuk | Player | 2001 | 1995–1996 | |
| Ken Hitchcock | Builder | 2023 | 2011–2017 | |
| Phil Housley | Player | 2015 | 1993–1994 | |
| Brett Hull | Player | 2009 | 1988–1998 | |
| Paul Kariya | Player | 2017 | 2007–2010 | |
| Guy Lapointe | Player | 1993 | 1982–1983 | |
| Al MacInnis | Player | 2007 | 1994–2003 | |
| Dickie Moore | Player | 1974 | 1967–1968 | |
| Joe Mullen | Player | 2000 | 1980, 1981–1986 | |
| Vaclav Nedomansky | Player | 2019 | 1983 | |
| Roger Neilson | Builder | 2002 | 1995–1998 | |
| Adam Oates | Player | 2012 | 1989–1992 | |
| Jacques Plante | Player | 1978 | 1968–1970 | |
| Chris Pronger | Player | 2015 | 1995–2004 | |
| Brendan Shanahan | Player | 2013 | 1991–1995 | |
| Peter Stastny | Player | 1998 | 1994–1995 | |
| Scott Stevens | Player | 2007 | 1990–1991 | |
| Keith Tkachuk | Player | 2026 | 2001-2007, 2007-2010 | |
| Pierre Turgeon | Player | 2023 | 1996-2001 | |

=== Foster Hewitt Memorial Award ===
One member of the St. Louis Blues organization have been honored with the Foster Hewitt Memorial Award. The award is presented by the Hockey Hall of Fame to members of the radio and television industry who make outstanding contributions to their profession and the game of ice hockey during their broadcasting career.

Members of the St. Louis Blues honored with the Foster Hewitt Memorial Award
| Individual | Year honored | Years with Blues as broadcaster | References |
|---|---|---|---|
| Dan Kelly | 1989 | 1968–1989 | |

=== Lester Patrick Trophy ===
The Lester Patrick Trophy has been presented by the National Hockey League and USA Hockey since 1966 to honor a recipient's contribution to ice hockey in the United States. This list includes all personnel who have ever been employed by the St. Louis Blues in any capacity and have also received the Lester Patrick Trophy.

Members of the St. Louis Blues honored with the Lester Patrick Trophy
| Individual | Year honored | Years with Blues | References |
|---|---|---|---|
| Emile Francis | 1982 | 1976–1983 | |
| Dan Kelly | 1989 | 1968–1989 | |
| Lynn Patrick | 1989 | 1967–1977 | |
| Larry Pleau | 2002 | 1997–present | |

=== United States Hockey Hall of Fame ===
Members of the St. Louis Blues inducted into the United States Hockey Hall of Fame
| Individual | Year inducted | Years with Blues | References |
|---|---|---|---|
| Tom Barrasso | 2009 | 2002–2003 | |
| Red Berenson | 2018 | 1967–1971, 1975–1982 | |
| Dave Christian | 2001 | 1991–1992 | |
| Phil Housley | 2004 | 1993–1994 | |
| Brett Hull | 2008 | 1988–1998 | |
| Craig Janney | 2016 | 1992–1995 | |
| Mark Johnson | 2004 | 1985 | |
| Joe Mullen | 1998 | 1980, 1981–1986 | |
| Doug Palazzari | 2000 | 1974–1975, 1976–1979 | |
| Craig Patrick | 1996 | 1974–1975 | |
| Larry Pleau | 2000 | 1997–present | |
| Gordie Roberts | 1999 | 1988–1990 | |
| Keith Tkachuk | 2011 | 2001–2010 | |
| Doug Weight | 2013 | 2001–2007 | |
| Scott Young | 2017 | 1998–2002, 2005–2006 | |

=== Retired numbers ===
The St. Louis Blues have retired eight of their jersey numbers and removed two others from circulation. The number 7 was honored on March 7, 2011, in tribute to four Blues who wore it – Red Berenson, Garry Unger, Joe Mullen, and Keith Tkachuk. The number 14 was honored for Doug Wickenheiser who played for the team from 1984 to 1987. Also out of circulation is the number 99 which was retired league-wide for Wayne Gretzky on February 6, 2000. Gretzky played one season (1995–96) of his 20-year NHL career with the Blues and was the only Blues player who ever wore the number 99 prior to its retirement.

St. Louis Blues retired numbers
| Number | Player | Position | Years with Blues as a player | Date of retirement ceremony | References |
|---|---|---|---|---|---|
| 2 | Al MacInnis | Defense | 1994–2003 | April 9, 2006 | |
| 3 | Bob Gassoff | Defense | 1974–1977 | October 1, 1977 | |
| 5 | Bob Plager | Defense | 1967–1978 | February 2, 2017 | |
| 8 | Barclay Plager | Defense | 1967–1977 | March 24, 1981 | |
| 11 | Brian Sutter | Left wing | 1976–1988 | December 30, 1988 | |
| 16 | Brett Hull | Right wing | 1988–1998 | December 5, 2006 | |
| 24 | Bernie Federko | Center | 1976–1989 | March 16, 1991 | |
| 44 | Chris Pronger | Defense | 1995–2004 | January 17, 2022 | |

== Other awards ==
St. Louis Blues who have received non-NHL awards
| Award | Description | Winner | Season | References |
|---|---|---|---|---|
| Best NHL Player ESPY Award | Best NHL player of the last calendar year | Chris Pronger | 2001 | |
| Charlie Conacher Humanitarian Award | For humanitarian or community service projects | Ed Staniowski | 1978–79 | |
| Charlie Conacher Humanitarian Award | For humanitarian or community service projects | Ed Kea | 1980–81 | |
| Viking Award | Most valuable Swedish player in NHL | Alexander Steen | 2013–14 | |

== See also ==
- List of National Hockey League awards
