= Ed Westfall =

Canadian ice hockey player

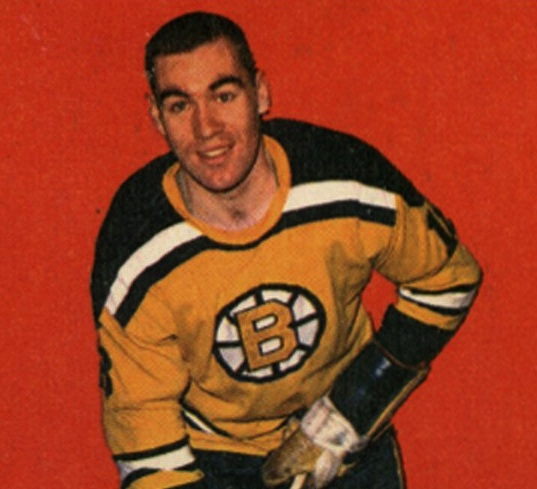
- Westfall with the Boston Bruins in 1963
- Born: September 19, 1940 (age 86) Belleville, Ontario, Canada
- Height: 6 ft 1 in (185 cm)
- Weight: 197 lb (89 kg; 14 st 1 lb)
- Position: Right wing
- Shot: Right
- Played for: Boston Bruins; New York Islanders
- Playing career: 1961–1979

Edwin Vernon Westfall (born September 19, 1940) is a Canadian former professional ice hockey player who played 18 seasons in the National Hockey League (NHL) with the Boston Bruins and New York Islanders from 1961 until 1979. Notable as a defensive specialist often tasked with defending against the star scorers of opposing teams, Westfall played most of his career as a right wing, although he played stints on defence in his earlier years and at centre in his later years. After his playing career ended, he became a color commentator on Islanders' broadcasts until 1998.

== Playing career ==
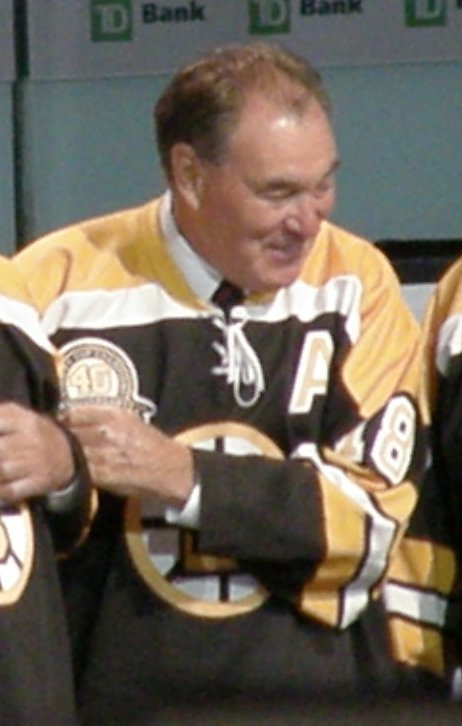
Westfall at TD Garden in 2010

He played his junior hockey with the Barrie Flyers and Niagara Falls Flyers, and started his professional career with the Kingston Frontenacs. By 1961 he joined the Bruins.

Westfall made his NHL debut with Boston Bruins on October 22, 1961 vs Toronto Maple Leafs at Boston Garden in a 9-1 Toronto win. Westfall scored his 1st NHL goal vs Chicago Black Hawks on November 29, 1961 at Chicago Stadium in a 7-4 Bruins loss.

Westfall started the 1962-63 season in Boston, but was sent back down to their minor league team, the Kingston Frontenacs to finish the season. Westfall had a surprise waiting for him by Kingston Frontenacs coach Harry Sinden, as he used Westfall on right wing as opposed to defense. Being a defensive defenseman he naturally became a defensive specialist up front as well. He also produced nicely offensively, scoring 5 goals and 16 assists in 21 games.

Westfall returned to the Bruins the next season, while also playing 13 games for the AHL Providence Reds, and by 1964, he was firmly ensconced on Boston's checking line.

Westfall's first notable offensive season came in 1964-65, when he managed 12 goals and 15 assists in 65 games. While being tasked to keep opposition away from Bruins' goaltenders Eddie Johnston and Gerry Cheevers. By 1966, he was firmly ensconced on Boston's checking line.

Westfall won the Stanley Cup with the Boston Bruins in 1970 and 1972. He was on the ice on Bobby Orr's famous Stanley Cup-winning goal in 1970 and also scored the second of the three fastest goals in National Hockey League (NHL) history, when the Bruins scored three goals in 20 seconds in a 1971 game with the Vancouver Canucks. During those seasons he made his reputation as a preeminent penalty killer (generally paired with centre Derek Sanderson or winger Don Marcotte), enough so that he was named to play in the NHL All-Star Game in 1971, 1973, 1974 and 1975. Westfall scored 18 shorthanded goals for Boston during the regular season and added six more in Stanley Cup play for the Bruins. The latter mark, which he shares with Sanderson, is still the club record. He was tasked with defending the opposing team’s top scorer. He found success in this role, leading him to be nicknamed "The Shadow". His best statistical season was during the 1970-71 season, when he scored 25 goals and tally 34 assists.

Westfall was chosen by the New York Islanders in the 1972 NHL Expansion Draft. He was subsequently made the first captain of the team, a position he held until the 1976–77 season. Giving the team a strong veteran presence, Westfall scored the first goal in franchise history in their first game against the Atlanta Flames on October 7, 1972, and was the first player to represent the Islanders in an NHL All-Star Game, in 1973. In 1974 Westfall was awarded the Charlie Conacher Humanitarian Award for his work with the physically and mentally handicapped. His best season statistically with the team was in 1974–75, when Westfall led the Islanders to their first playoffs and into the Stanley Cup semifinals, exploding in the playoffs with five goals and 10 assists to cap a 22-goal, 55-point regular season. He was again named to the NHL 1975 All-Star game.

He remained an effective scorer through the 1976–77 season, in which he was awarded the Bill Masterton Trophy for perseverance and dedication, after which he relinquished the team captaincy to Clark Gillies. His scoring declined sharply in his final two seasons, during which he spent his time on checking lines and penalty killing.

Due to his contributions to the team Westfall is often referred to as one of the founding fathers of the New York Islanders.

== Retirement ==
Westfall retired having played 1226 career NHL games, scoring 231 goals and 394 assists for 625 points.

Westfall splits his residence between Manhattan New York and Naples Florida. He is a father of five, grandfather of five, and recently became a great-grandfather.

After the end of his playing days, Westfall became the Islanders' color commentator for what was then known as SportsChannel New York. He was often dubbed "18" by his confidant and broadcasting partner Jiggs McDonald because, during his playing career, he wore that number and by his former Islander teammates. Westfall continued in that position until he retired in 1998, and former St. Louis Blues player Joe Micheletti replaced him in the broadcast booth. He made occasional appearances on Islanders' broadcasts for several seasons after that.

Westfall was part of CTV's broadcast team for the 1984 Canada Cup tournament and select NHL on CTV broadcasts. He provided reports and did interviews from the ice level.

On November 19, 2011, Westfall was inducted into the New York Islanders Hall of Fame. The Islanders held "Ed Westfall Night" in his honor. He and his former partner in the booth "Jiggs" McDonald called the second period in the game that night between two of his former teams, the New York Islanders and the Boston Bruins.

In 2023, he was named one of the top 100 Bruins players of all time.

In 2023 the Peconic Hockey Foundation opened a skating arena in Long Island named in Westfall's honor. The foundation also gave him their lifetime achievement award.

He was inducted into the New York State Hockey Hall of Fame in 2024.

== Awards and honors ==
- Stanley Cup champion (1970, 1972)
- NHL All-Star in 1971, 1973, 1974 and 1975
- Seventh Player Award (1969)
- Charlie Conacher Humanitarian Award (1974)
- Bill Masterton Memorial Trophy (1977)
- New York Islanders Hall of Fame (2011)
- Named one of the top 100 best Bruins players of all time
- Inducted into the New York Hockey Hall of Fame in 2024

== Career statistics ==
=== Regular season and playoffs ===
			Regular season					Playoffs
Season	Team	League	GP	G	A	Pts	PIM	GP	G	A	Pts	PIM
1957–58	Barrie Flyers	OHA-Jr.	51	3	10	13	60	4	0	0	0	4
1958–59	Barrie Flyers	OHA-Jr.	54	4	10	14	63	6	0	4	4	2
1959–60	Barrie Flyers	OHA-Jr.	48	7	28	35	63	6	0	4	4	28
1959–60	Kingston Frontenacs	EPHL	1	0	0	0	2	—	—	—	—	—
1960–61	Niagara Falls Flyers	OHA-Jr.	48	9	45	54	72	7	2	7	9	6
1960–61	Kingston Frontenacs	EPHL	2	0	0	0	0	—	—	—	—	—
1961–62	Boston Bruins	NHL	63	2	9	11	53	—	—	—	—	—
1962–63	Boston Bruins	NHL	48	1	11	12	34	—	—	—	—	—
1962–63	Kingston Frontenacs	EPHL	21	5	16	21	14	—	—	—	—	—
1963–64	Boston Bruins	NHL	55	1	5	6	35	—	—	—	—	—
1963–64	Providence Reds	AHL	13	1	3	4	8	3	0	0	0	4
1964–65	Boston Bruins	NHL	68	12	15	27	65	—	—	—	—	—
1965–66	Boston Bruins	NHL	59	9	21	30	42	—	—	—	—	—
1966–67	Boston Bruins	NHL	70	12	24	36	26	—	—	—	—	—
1967–68	Boston Bruins	NHL	73	14	22	36	38	4	2	0	2	2
1968–69	Boston Bruins	NHL	70	18	24	42	22	10	3	7	10	11
1969–70	Boston Bruins	NHL	72	14	22	36	28	14	3	5	8	4
1970–71	Boston Bruins	NHL	78	25	34	59	48	7	1	2	3	2
1971–72	Boston Bruins	NHL	77	18	26	44	19	15	4	3	7	10
1972–73	New York Islanders	NHL	67	15	31	46	25	—	—	—	—	—
1973–74	New York Islanders	NHL	68	19	23	42	28	—	—	—	—	—
1974–75	New York Islanders	NHL	73	22	33	55	28	17	5	10	15	12
1975–76	New York Islanders	NHL	80	25	31	56	27	8	2	3	5	0
1976–77	New York Islanders	NHL	79	14	33	47	8	12	1	5	6	0
1977–78	New York Islanders	NHL	71	5	19	24	14	2	0	0	0	0
1978–79	New York Islanders	NHL	55	5	11	16	4	6	1	2	3	0
NHL totals			1,226	231	394	625	544	95	22	37	59	41

== See also ==
- List of NHL players with 1,000 games played

Preceded by Position created	New York Islanders captain 1972–77	Succeeded by Clark Gillies
