= Mike Matheson =

Canadian ice hockey player (born 1994)

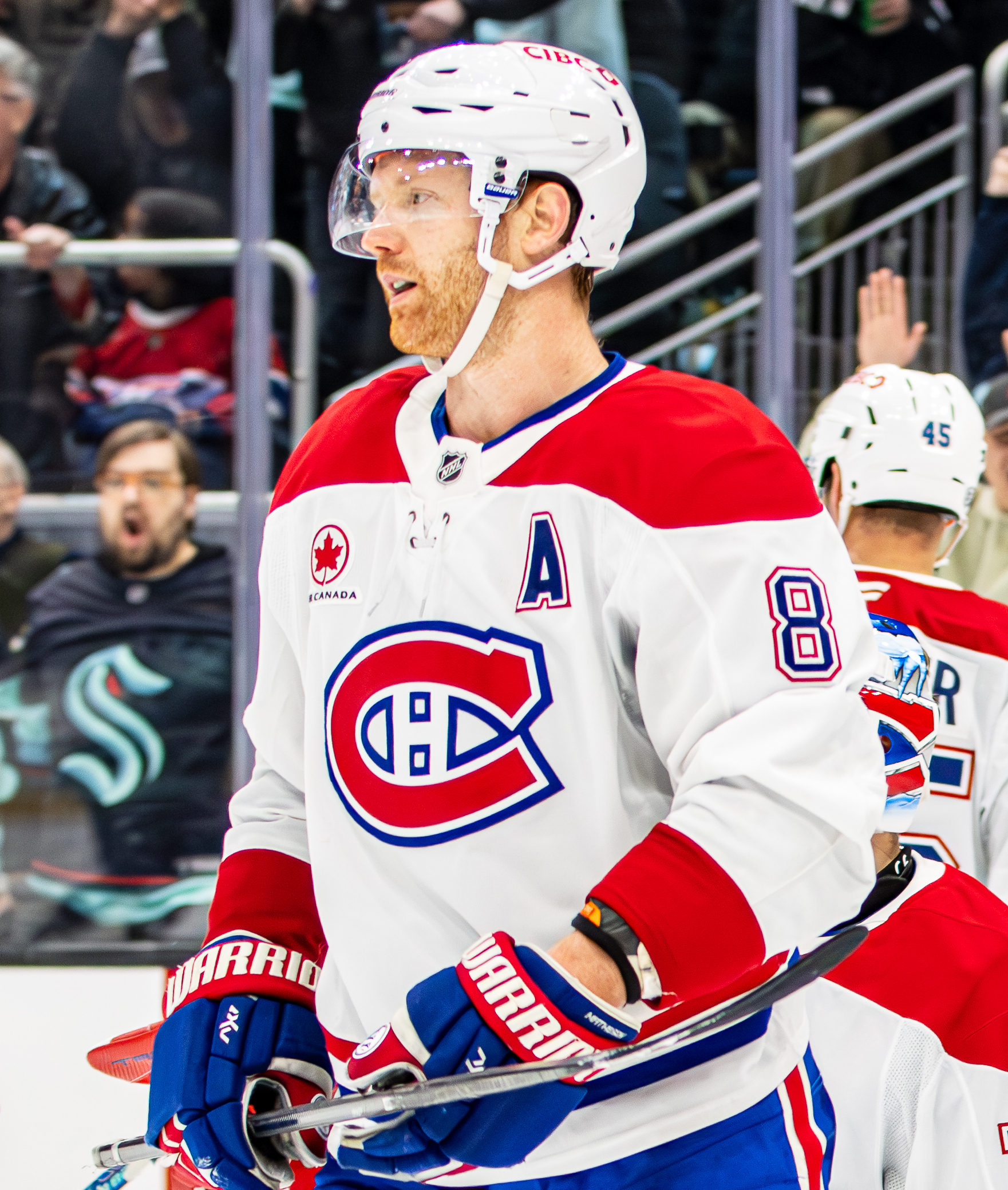
- Matheson with the Montreal Canadiens in 2025
- Born: February 27, 1994 (age 32) Pointe-Claire, Quebec, Canada
- Height: 6 ft 2 in (188 cm)
- Weight: 196 lb (89 kg; 14 st 0 lb)
- Position: Defence
- Shoots: Left
- NHL team Former teams: Montreal Canadiens; Florida Panthers; Pittsburgh Penguins
- National team: Canada
- NHL draft: 23rd overall, 2012; Florida Panthers
- Playing career: 2015–present

Michael Matheson (born February 27, 1994) is a Canadian professional ice hockey player who is a defenceman and alternate captain for the Montreal Canadiens of the National Hockey League (NHL). He was selected in the first round, 23rd overall, by the Florida Panthers in the 2012 NHL entry draft. Matheson has also previously played for the Pittsburgh Penguins.

== Playing career ==
=== Early years ===
As a youth, Matheson played in the 2006 and 2008 iterations of the Quebec International Pee-Wee Hockey Tournament with a minor ice hockey team from the West Island.

=== Junior ===
Matheson began his junior career at the Midget AAA level with the Lac St-Louis Lions of the Quebec Junior AAA Hockey League (QMAAA) from 2009 to 2011. In 2011–12, he joined the Dubuque Fighting Saints of the United States Hockey League (USHL) where he led all defencemen in scoring. He then committed to play collegiately for Boston College of the National Collegiate Athletic Association (NCAA). Contextually, Matheson cited personal motivation for leaving his native Quebec as the ability to develop better as a player in both the USHL and in the NCAA.

=== Collegiate ===
Following his freshman year at Boston College in 2012–13, Matheson was named to the Hockey East's All-Rookie Team. For his sophomore campaign, Matheson earned All-First Team honours in the Hockey East conference as well as All-Second Team East honors in the NCAA as determined by the American Hockey Coaches Association (AHCA).

Amid rumours of him leaving the college ranks to sign with NHL draft team, the Florida Panthers, Matheson decided to remain as part of the Eagles for the 2014–15 season. Thereafter, he was named team captain. At the conclusion of the season, Matheson signed an entry-level contract with the Panthers, forgoing his senior year of NCAA eligibility, and was sent to play with the Panthers' American Hockey League (AHL) affiliate, the San Antonio Rampage.

=== Professional ===
==== Florida Panthers (2015–2020) ====
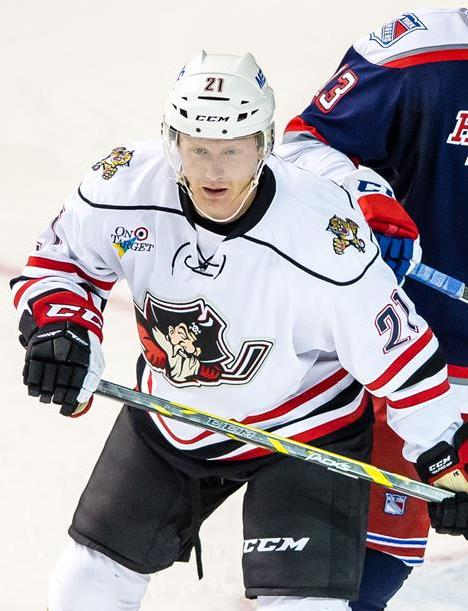
Matheson with the Portland Pirates in 2015

Initially assigned to the Panthers' newfound AHL affiliate the Portland Pirates to begin the 2015–16 season, Matheson made his NHL debut in a 3–1 win over the Winnipeg Jets on February 20, 2016. Similarly, he made his Stanley Cup playoffs debut for Game 2 of the Panthers' first round matchup with the New York Islanders on April 15. His first career NHL goal early into the following season against the Tampa Bay Lightning.

On October 7, 2017, the Panthers resigned Matheson to an eight-year, $39 million contract extension worth $4.875 million annually. On October 13, 2018, during a game against the Vancouver Canucks, Matheson checked Canucks forward Elias Pettersson, resulting in Pettersson leaving the game with a concussion. While Matheson was not penalized for the play on the ice, the NHL Department of Player Safety believed that Matheson had an intent to injure, resulting in him suspension two games, thereby forfeiting $52,419.36 in salary. Following the incident, Matheson said, "I know deep down there was no frustration in me when that play happened and there was no intent to injure on my part;" he apologized to Pettersson via text.

==== Pittsburgh Penguins (2020–2022) ====
On September 24, 2020, Matheson was traded by the Panthers to the Pittsburgh Penguins, along with Colton Sceviour, in exchange for Patric Hörnqvist. During the course of the 2021–22 season, he would post then career-highs in both goals (11) and points (31), while his five game-winning goals (GWG) ranked second in Penguins franchise history for most by a defenceman in a single campaign.

==== Montreal Canadiens (2022–present) ====
On July 16, 2022, Matheson, along with a 2023 fourth-round draft pick, was traded to the Montreal Canadiens in exchange for Jeff Petry and Ryan Poehling. The trade reunited Matheson with his former agent Kent Hughes, who had become general manager of the Canadiens in January 2022. Expected to become the team's top defenceman, Matheson was considered to have performed strongly in the preseason games lead up to the 2022–23 season, but developed an abdominal muscle strain while participating in a Kraft Hockeyville exhibition game. It was subsequently announced that he would be sidelined for the first eight weeks of the season. He made his franchise debut on November 19, registering a goal and an assist in a 5–4 shootout win over the Philadelphia Flyers. Despite missing significant playing time over the course of the campaign, Matheson received recognition as the team's annual recipient of the Jean Béliveau Trophy, awarded to the player who exemplifies leadership qualities within the community.

In advance of the 2023–24 season, with the departure of fellow blueliner Joel Edmundson to the Washington Capitals, Matheson was named as an alternate captain of the Canadiens organization. He then reached a series of career milestones over the course of the campaign. On December 30, 2023, he skated in his 500th career NHL game in a 4–1 loss to the Florida Panthers whereas he recorded his 200th career NHL point on January 11 versus the San Jose Sharks. During the course of the 2024–25 season, Matheson played in his 600th career NHL game on February 8, 2025.

Entering the 2025–26 season as an impending unrestricted free agent, Matheson agreed to a five-year, $30 million contract extension with the Canadiens on November 28, 2025.

== International play ==
Medal record

Representing Canada

Men's ice hockey

World Championships
Silver medal – second place	2017 Germany/France	
Gold medal – first place	2016 Russia	

Ivan Hlinka Memorial Tournament
Gold medal – first place	2011 Slovakia/Czech Republic	

Internationally, Matheson first represented Hockey Canada as part of team Canada Quebec at the 2011 World U-17 Hockey Challenge where his team ultimately finished in fourth place. Thereafter, he was named to the national under-18 team for that year's Ivan Hlinka Memorial Tournament, winning a gold medal.

In May 2016, he was added to the Canadian national senior team for the 2016 IIHF World Championship, capturing gold along with his country. Matheson was awarded the IIHF Directorate Award as the tournament's best defenceman and was likewise named to the media All-Star Team. Participating again the following year, he and Team Canada would earn silver after falling 2–1 in a shootout to Sweden during the championship final.

In May 2025, Matheson would make his third IIHF World Championship appearance for Canada.

== Personal life ==
Matheson was born to Montréalais parents Rod and Marg and was raised on the West Island, a predominantly Anglophone area of the city. Despite this, both he and his older siblings, sister Kelly and brother Kenny, attended French immersion classes during their respective schooling at École Marguerite-Bourgeoys and John Rennie High School located in Pointe-Claire, Quebec. He learned to skate by age 2, and firstly played ringette with his sister due to local age restrictions surrounding enrolment in minor hockey. Amidst his second NHL season, Matheson was inducted into the Hockey West Island Hall of Fame.

In 2012, Matheson met Emily Pfalzer, an American professional ice hockey player and Olympic gold medalist, while both were playing at Boston College. The two became engaged in the summer of 2018 and married a year later. Their son, Hudson, was born in 2021, while their daughter, Mila, was born in 2024.

== Career statistics ==
=== Regular season and playoffs ===
			Regular season					Playoffs
Season	Team	League	GP	G	A	Pts	PIM	GP	G	A	Pts	PIM
2009–10	Lac Saint-Louis Lions	QMAAA	30	5	6	11	33	17	6	7	13	10
2010–11	Lac Saint-Louis Lions	QMAAA	35	14	24	38	72	15	7	18	25	16
2011–12	Dubuque Fighting Saints	USHL	53	11	16	27	84	5	4	1	5	4
2012–13	Boston College	HE	36	8	17	25	78	—	—	—	—	—
2013–14	Boston College	HE	38	3	18	21	49	—	—	—	—	—
2014–15	Boston College	HE	38	3	22	25	26	—	—	—	—	—
2014–15	San Antonio Rampage	AHL	5	0	2	2	8	—	—	—	—	—
2015–16	Portland Pirates	AHL	54	8	12	20	30	3	0	1	1	2
2015–16	Florida Panthers	NHL	3	0	0	0	2	5	0	1	1	0
2016–17	Florida Panthers	NHL	81	7	10	17	36	—	—	—	—	—
2017–18	Florida Panthers	NHL	81	10	17	27	61	—	—	—	—	—
2018–19	Florida Panthers	NHL	75	8	19	27	44	—	—	—	—	—
2019–20	Florida Panthers	NHL	59	8	12	20	14	2	0	0	0	8
2020–21	Pittsburgh Penguins	NHL	44	5	11	16	28	6	0	0	0	0
2021–22	Pittsburgh Penguins	NHL	74	11	20	31	33	7	1	5	6	6
2022–23	Montreal Canadiens	NHL	48	8	26	34	33	—	—	—	—	—
2023–24	Montreal Canadiens	NHL	82	11	51	62	58	—	—	—	—	—
2024–25	Montreal Canadiens	NHL	80	6	25	31	51	5	0	1	1	2
2025–26	Montreal Canadiens	NHL	78	7	30	37	34	19	2	2	4	20
NHL totals			705	81	221	302	394	44	3	9	12	36

=== International ===
Year	Team	Event	Result	GP	G	A	Pts	PIM
2011	Canada Quebec	U17	4th	6	2	6	8	10
2011	Canada	IH18	1st place, gold medalist(s)	5	0	0	0	2
2016	Canada	WC	1st place, gold medalist(s)	10	2	4	6	0
2017	Canada	WC	2nd place, silver medalist(s)	10	1	6	7	10
2025	Canada	WC	5th	8	0	2	2	0
Junior totals				11	2	6	8	12
Senior totals				28	3	12	15	10

== Awards and honours ==
Award	Year	Ref
QMAAA
Top Prospect Award	2010	
First All-Star Team	2011	
Top Defenceman	2011	
USHL
USHL/NHL Top Prospects Game	2012	
All-USHL Rookie Team	2012	
College
All-Hockey East Rookie Team	2013	
All-Hockey East First Team	2014	
AHCA East Second-Team All-American	2014	
New England D1 All-Stars	2014	
International
IIHF Directorate Award (best defenceman)	2016	
IIHF World Championship All-Star Team	2016	
Montreal Canadiens
Jacques Beauchamp Molson Trophy	2026	

Awards and achievements
Preceded by Jonathan Huberdeau	Florida Panthers' first-round draft pick 2012	Succeeded by Aleksander Barkov
