= Pit Martin =

Canadian ice hockey player (1943–2008)

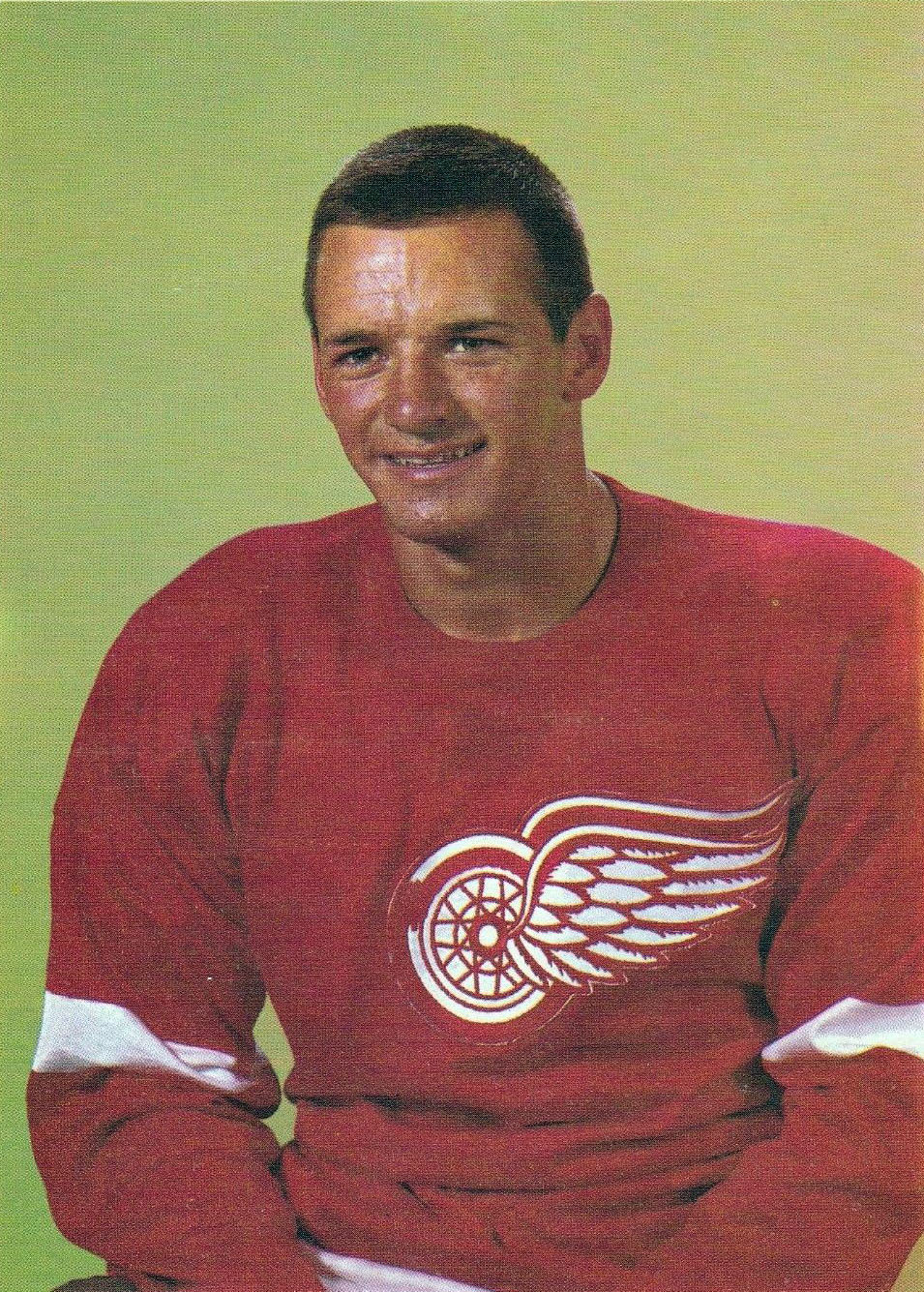
- Martin with the Detroit Red Wings in the 1960s
- Born: December 9, 1943 Noranda, Quebec, Canada
- Died: November 30, 2008 (aged 64) Rouyn-Noranda, Quebec, Canada
- Height: 5 ft 8 in (173 cm)
- Weight: 165 lb (75 kg; 11 st 11 lb)
- Position: Centre
- Shot: Right
- Played for: NHL; Detroit Red Wings; Boston Bruins; Chicago Black Hawks; Vancouver Canucks; AHL; Pittsburgh Hornets
- Playing career: 1962–1979

Hubert Jacques "Pit" Martin (December 9, 1943 – November 30, 2008) was a Canadian professional ice hockey centre who served as captain for the Chicago Black Hawks of the National Hockey League (NHL) from 1975 to 1977. He was an NHL All-Star and Bill Masterton Memorial Trophy winner.

Martin played seventeen seasons in the NHL for the Detroit Red Wings, Boston Bruins, Chicago Black Hawks, and Vancouver Canucks.

== Playing career ==
Nicknamed Pit after a comic strip character in a French newspaper, Martin was scouted by former NHL goaltender Wilf Cude and joined the Red Wings organization. He is remembered among hockey fans as being involved in one of the most one-sided trades in history.

Martin got his first NHL goal as a member of the Detroit Red Wings in his team's 5-2 loss to the Montreal Canadiens on December 7, 1963.

Martin scored four goals in a single game on January 27, 1966 in Boston's 5-3 victory over Chicago.

In May 1967, Martin, along with Gilles Marotte and Jack Norris, was traded from Boston to Chicago for Phil Esposito, Ken Hodge, and Fred Stanfield, who would become core elements of future Boston powerhouse teams. However, Martin himself was a bright spot of the trade for the Black Hawks, starring for them for ten seasons as a skilled two-way centre. He was selected to play in the NHL All-Star Game in four straight seasons.

Martin played 1101 career NHL games from 1961–62 to 1978–79. He recorded 324 goals and 485 assists for 809 points. His best statistical season was the 1972–73 season when he set career highs with 61 assists and 90 points, adding ten goals in the playoffs as the Hawks made it to the Stanley Cup finals. He wore number 7.

== Death ==
On November 30, 2008, Martin was reported missing following a snowmobile accident on Lake Kanasuta near Rouyn-Noranda, Quebec. He was riding a snowmobile behind a friend when the ice on the lake collapsed shortly after his friend had passed over it. Martin was pronounced dead on December 1, 2008. On December 2, 2008, Quebec Provincial Police divers recovered Martin's body from the lake.

== Awards ==
- OHA-Jr. First All-Star Team (1962)
- OHA-Jr. MVP (1962)
- Bill Masterton Trophy (1970)
- National Hockey League All-Star Game (1971, 1972, 1973, 1974)

== Career statistics ==
| | | | Regular season | | | | | Playoffs |
| Season | Team | League | GP | G | A | Pts | PIM | GP | G | A | Pts | PIM |
|---|---|---|---|---|---|---|---|---|---|---|---|---|
| 1959–60 | Hamilton Tiger Cubs | OHA-Jr. | 29 | 13 | 12 | 25 | 14 | — | — | — | — | — |
| 1960–61 | Hamilton Red Wings | OHA-Jr. | 48 | 20 | 21 | 41 | 17 | 10 | 7 | 2 | 9 | 8 |
| 1961–62 | Hamilton Red Wings | OHA-Jr. | 48 | 42 | 46 | 88 | 46 | 10 | 3 | 9 | 12 | 0 |
| 1961–62 | Detroit Red Wings | NHL | 1 | 0 | 1 | 1 | 0 | — | — | — | — | — |
| 1961–62 | Hamilton Red Wings | M-Cup | — | — | — | — | — | 14 | 12 | 11 | 23 | 22 |
| 1962–63 | Hamilton Red Wings | OHA-Jr. | 49 | 36 | 49 | 85 | 67 | 5 | 1 | 1 | 2 | 10 |
| 1962–63 | Pittsburgh Hornets | AHL | 5 | 1 | 2 | 3 | 0 | — | — | — | — | — |
| 1963–64 | Pittsburgh Hornets | AHL | 21 | 3 | 7 | 10 | 2 | — | — | — | — | — |
| 1963–64 | Detroit Red Wings | NHL | 50 | 9 | 12 | 21 | 28 | 14 | 1 | 4 | 5 | 14 |
| 1964–65 | Detroit Red Wings | NHL | 58 | 8 | 9 | 17 | 32 | 3 | 0 | 1 | 1 | 2 |
| 1965–66 | Pittsburgh Hornets | AHL | 16 | 6 | 6 | 12 | 26 | — | — | — | — | — |
| 1965–66 | Detroit Red Wings | NHL | 10 | 1 | 1 | 2 | 0 | — | — | — | — | — |
| 1965–66 | Boston Bruins | NHL | 41 | 16 | 11 | 27 | 10 | — | — | — | — | — |
| 1966–67 | Boston Bruins | NHL | 70 | 20 | 22 | 42 | 40 | — | — | — | — | — |
| 1967–68 | Chicago Black Hawks | NHL | 63 | 16 | 19 | 35 | 36 | 11 | 3 | 6 | 9 | 2 |
| 1968–69 | Chicago Black Hawks | NHL | 76 | 23 | 38 | 61 | 73 | — | — | — | — | — |
| 1969–70 | Chicago Black Hawks | NHL | 73 | 30 | 33 | 63 | 61 | 8 | 3 | 3 | 6 | 4 |
| 1970–71 | Chicago Black Hawks | NHL | 62 | 22 | 33 | 55 | 40 | 17 | 2 | 7 | 9 | 12 |
| 1971–72 | Chicago Black Hawks | NHL | 78 | 24 | 51 | 75 | 56 | 8 | 4 | 2 | 6 | 4 |
| 1972–73 | Chicago Black Hawks | NHL | 78 | 29 | 61 | 90 | 30 | 15 | 10 | 6 | 16 | 6 |
| 1973–74 | Chicago Black Hawks | NHL | 78 | 30 | 47 | 77 | 43 | 7 | 2 | 0 | 2 | 4 |
| 1974–75 | Chicago Black Hawks | NHL | 70 | 19 | 26 | 45 | 34 | 8 | 1 | 1 | 2 | 2 |
| 1975–76 | Chicago Black Hawks | NHL | 80 | 32 | 39 | 71 | 44 | 4 | 1 | 0 | 1 | 4 |
| 1976–77 | Chicago Black Hawks | NHL | 75 | 17 | 36 | 53 | 22 | 2 | 0 | 0 | 0 | 0 |
| 1977–78 | Chicago Black Hawks | NHL | 7 | 1 | 1 | 2 | 0 | — | — | — | — | — |
| 1977–78 | Vancouver Canucks | NHL | 67 | 15 | 31 | 46 | 36 | — | — | — | — | — |
| 1978–79 | Vancouver Canucks | NHL | 64 | 12 | 14 | 26 | 24 | 3 | 0 | 1 | 1 | 2 |
| NHL totals | | | 1,101 | 324 | 485 | 809 | 609 | 100 | 27 | 31 | 58 | 56 |

== See also ==
- List of NHL players with 1,000 games played

Awards and achievements
| Preceded by Ted Hampson | Bill Masterton Memorial Trophy winner 1970 | Succeeded by Jean Ratelle |
Sporting positions
| Preceded by Ken Dryden | NHLPA President; 1974–1975 | Succeeded by Bobby Clarke |
| Preceded by Pat Stapleton | Chicago Black Hawks captain 1975–77 with Stan Mikita, 1976–77 | Succeeded by Keith Magnuson |
