= Mike McPhee =

Canadian ice hockey player

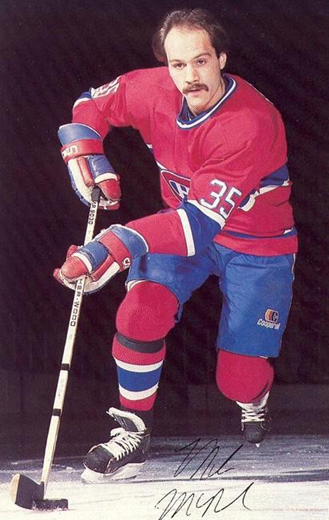
- McPhee in 1984 card
- Born: July 14, 1960 (age 65) Sydney, Nova Scotia, Canada
- Height: 6 ft 1 in (185 cm)
- Weight: 203 lb (92 kg; 14 st 7 lb)
- Position: Left wing
- Shot: Left
- Played for: AHL; Nova Scotia Voyageurs; NHL; Montreal Canadiens; Minnesota North Stars; Dallas Stars
- NHL draft: 124th overall, 1980; Montreal Canadiens
- Playing career: 1982–1994

Michael Joseph McPhee (born July 14, 1960) is a Canadian former professional ice hockey player who played as a forward. He was selected in the sixth round, 124th overall, by the Montreal Canadiens in the 1980 NHL entry draft and won the Stanley Cup with the Canadiens in 1986. McPhee also played for the Minnesota North Stars and Dallas Stars.

== Playing career ==
Originally selected in the sixth-round (124th overall) of the 1980 NHL entry draft by the Montreal Canadiens, McPhee began his professional career with American Hockey League (AHL) affiliate the Nova Scotia Voyageurs in 1982.

After a brief AHL stint, he was recalled to the National Hockey League (NHL) and made his debut with Montreal in 1984. Just two seasons later, McPhee was a member of the team's 1986 Stanley Cup winning team. Collectively, his best production output came during the 1987-88 season where, with linemates Guy Carbonneau and Russ Courtnall, he scored 23 goals and 43 points. The following season, McPhee would take part in the only NHL All-Star Game of his career. He was also a three-time winner of the Jacques Beauchamp Molson Trophy as the Canadiens' unsung hero.

On August 14, 1992, McPhee would be traded to the Minnesota North Stars in exchange for a 5th round pick in the 1993 NHL entry draft. While in Minnesota, he was a favourite of head coach/former teammate Bob Gainey, who rewarded McPhee for his two-way style, which was similar to his own.

When the North Stars relocated to Dallas prior to the 1993–94 season, McPhee continued to thrive while playing his defensive game. Unfortunately, he would be forced to retire that offseason due to a recurring knee injury.

== Personal life ==
Born on July 14, 1960, in Sydney, Nova Scotia to parents Stan and Monica, McPhee grew up in the small community of River Bourgeois, Nova Scotia located in the southern portion of Cape Breton Island.

Prior to making his professional debut in 1982, he earned a civil engineering degree at Rensselaer Polytechnic Institute (RPI), where he was a standout collegiate player for the Engineers of the National Collegiate Athletic Association (NCAA). Upon retiring from the NHL, McPhee attended the University of Dallas where he received his MBA distinction and currently works as a financial advisor for the National Bank of Canada in Halifax, Nova Scotia.

He and wife Jane Anne have two children, Adam (b. 1987) and Aly (b. 1989). The latter was a prominent track and field athlete at McGill University, winning six gold medals and a silver in five meets during the 2007 season. She also competed for Team Nova Scotia at the 2005 Canada Summer Games and 2006 Canadian Junior Track and Field Championships respectively.

== Career statistics ==
			Regular season					Playoffs
Season	Team	League	GP	G	A	Pts	PIM	GP	G	A	Pts	PIM
1977–78	Strait Pirates	NCJHL	32	50	37	87	—	—	—	—	—	—
1978–79	RPI Engineers	ECAC	26	14	19	33	16	—	—	—	—	—
1979–80	RPI Engineers	ECAC	27	15	21	36	24	—	—	—	—	—
1980–81	RPI Engineers	ECAC	29	28	18	46	22	—	—	—	—	—
1981–82	RPI Engineers	ECAC	6	0	3	3	4	—	—	—	—	—
1982–83	Nova Scotia Voyageurs	AHL	42	10	15	25	29	7	1	1	2	14
1983–84	Montreal Canadiens	NHL	14	5	2	7	41	15	1	0	1	31
1983–84	Nova Scotia Voyageurs	AHL	67	22	33	55	101	—	—	—	—	—
1984–85	Montreal Canadiens	NHL	70	17	**22**	39	**120**	12	4	1	5	32
1985–86	Montreal Canadiens	NHL	70	19	21	40	69	20	3	4	7	45
1986–87	Montreal Canadiens	NHL	79	18	21	39	58	17	7	2	9	13
1987–88	Montreal Canadiens	NHL	77	**23**	20	**43**	53	11	4	3	7	8
1988–89	Montreal Canadiens	NHL	73	19	**22**	41	74	20	4	7	11	30
1989–90	Montreal Canadiens	NHL	56	**23**	18	41	47	9	1	1	2	16
1990–91	Montreal Canadiens	NHL	64	22	21	**43**	56	13	1	7	8	12
1991–92	Montreal Canadiens	NHL	78	16	15	31	63	8	1	1	2	4
1992–93	Minnesota North Stars	NHL	**84**	18	**22**	40	44	—	—	—	—	—
1993–94	Dallas Stars	NHL	79	20	15	35	36	9	2	1	3	2
NHL totals			744	200	199	399	661	134	28	27	55	193

Boldface denotes career high in each statistics.

== Awards and achievements ==
- Stanley Cup champion - 1986
- NHL All-Star Game participant - 1989
- Jacques Beauchamp Molson Trophy - 1988, 1990, 1991
- Inducted into the Nova Scotia Sport Hall of Fame - 1999
- Inducted into the Cape Breton Sport Hall of Fame - 2000
