= 27th National Hockey League All-Star Game =

Professional ice hockey exhibition game

27th NHL All-Star Game
	1	2	3	Total
East	2	0	2	4
West	0	3	3	6
- Date: January 29, 1974
- Arena: Chicago Stadium
- City: Chicago
- MVP: Garry Unger (St. Louis)
- Attendance: 16,426

The 27th National Hockey League All-Star Game was held in the Chicago Stadium in Chicago, home of the Chicago Black Hawks, on January 29, 1974. It was the third time that the All-Star Game was held in Chicago. The East Division All-Stars defeated the West Division All-Stars 5–4. Garry Unger was named the game's most valuable player.

== Team lineups ==
Five East Division players selected for the game withdrew at the last minute. Bobby Orr was injured, Serge Savard was ordered to rest, Guy Lapointe was injured, Jacques Lemaire was injured, and Gilbert Perreault was injured. Red Berenson, Jocelyn Guevremont, Jim McKenny, Henri Richard and Larry Robinson were named as replacements.

=== East Division All-Stars ===
- Coach: Scotty Bowman (Montreal Canadiens)

#	Nat.	Player	Pos.	Team
Goaltenders
1	(Canada)	Gilles Gilbert		Boston Bruins
30	(Canada)	Dave Dryden		Buffalo Sabres
Defencemen
2	(Canada)	Brad Park		New York Rangers
3	(Canada)	Denis Potvin		New York Islanders
5	(Canada)	Jocelyn Guevremont		Vancouver Canucks
15	(Canada)	Larry Robinson		Montreal Canadiens
18	(Canada)	Jim McKenny		Toronto Maple Leafs
20	(Canada)	Dallas Smith		Boston Bruins
Forwards
6	(Canada)	Rick Martin	LW	Buffalo Sabres
7	(Canada)	Phil Esposito	C	Boston Bruins
8	(Canada)	Ken Hodge	RW	Boston Bruins
9	(Canada)	Norm Ullman	C	Toronto Maple Leafs
10	(Canada)	Bobby Schmautz	RW	Vancouver Canucks
11	(Canada)	Red Berenson	C	Detroit Red Wings
12	(Canada)	Yvan Cournoyer	RW	Montreal Canadiens
14	(Canada)	Wayne Cashman	LW	Boston Bruins
16	(Canada)	Henri Richard	C	Montreal Canadiens
19	(Canada)	Ed Westfall	RW	New York Islanders
21	(Canada)	Mickey Redmond	RW	Detroit Red Wings
27	(Canada)	Frank Mahovlich	LW	Montreal Canadiens

=== West Division All-Stars ===
- Coach: Billy Reay (Chicago Black Hawks)

#	Nat.	Player	Pos.	Team
Goaltenders
1	(Canada)	Bernie Parent		Philadelphia Flyers
35	(Canada)	Tony Esposito		Chicago Black Hawks
Defencemen
2	(Canada)	Bill White		Chicago Black Hawks
3	(Canada)	Ed Van Impe		Philadelphia Flyers
4	(Canada)	Dave Burrows		Pittsburgh Penguins
5	(Canada)	Barclay Plager		St. Louis Blues
14	(Canada)	Joe Watson		Philadelphia Flyers
26	(Canada)	Don Awrey		St. Louis Blues
Forwards
6	(Canada)	Garry Unger	C	St. Louis Blues
7	(Canada)	Pit Martin	C	Chicago Black Hawks
8	(Canada)	Bill Goldsworthy	RW	Minnesota North Stars
9	(Canada)	Al McDonough	LW	Atlanta Flames
10	(Canada)	Dennis Hull	LW	Chicago Black Hawks
11	(Canada)	Jim Pappin	RW	Chicago Black Hawks
12	(Canada)	Bob Berry	LW	Los Angeles Kings
16	(Canada)	Bobby Clarke	C	Philadelphia Flyers
17	(Canada)	Joey Johnston	LW	California Golden Seals
18	(Canada)	Lowell MacDonald	LW	Pittsburgh Penguins
21	(Canada)	Stan Mikita	C	Chicago Black Hawks
22	(Canada)	Dennis Hextall	C	Minnesota North Stars

G = Goaltenders; D = Defenceman; C = Center; LW/RW = Left Wing/Right Wing

Source: Podnieks

== Game summary ==
#	Score	Team	Goalscorer (Assist(s))	Time
First period
1	1-0	East	Mahovlich (Cournoyer, Ullman)	3:33
2	2-0	East	Cournoyer (Ullman)	16:20
Penalties : P. Martin(West) 11:17
Second period
3	2-1	West	Berry (Mikita)	5:59
4	2-2	West	McDonough (Clarke, MacDonald)	13:55
5	2-3	West	MacDonald (Plager, Awrey) PPG	19:07
Penalties : Hextall(West) 7:42, Berenson(East) 18:35
Third period
6	2-4	West	Mikita (Unger, White)	2:25
7	2–5	West	Unger (White, Mikita) SHG	7:54
8	3–5	East	Potvin (unassisted)	9:55
9	4–5	East	Redmond (Berenson)	14:55
10	4-6	West	P. Martin (Pappin)	19:13
Penalties : Plager(West) 6:27

Goaltenders :

- East: Gilbert (29:59 minutes), Dryden (30:01 minutes).
- West: Parent (29:59 minutes), T. Esposito (30:01 minutes).

Shots on goal :

- East (35) 15 - 10 - 10
- West (28) 8 - 8 - 12

Referee : Art Skov

Linesmen : Matt Pavelich, Willard Norris

Source: Podnieks

== See also ==
- 1973–74 NHL season
