= 23rd National Hockey League All-Star Game =

Professional ice hockey exhibition game

23rd NHL All-Star Game
	1	2	3	Total
East	2	2	0	4
West	1	0	0	1
- Date: January 20, 1970
- Arena: St. Louis Arena
- City: St. Louis
- MVP: Bobby Hull (Chicago)
- Attendance: 16,587

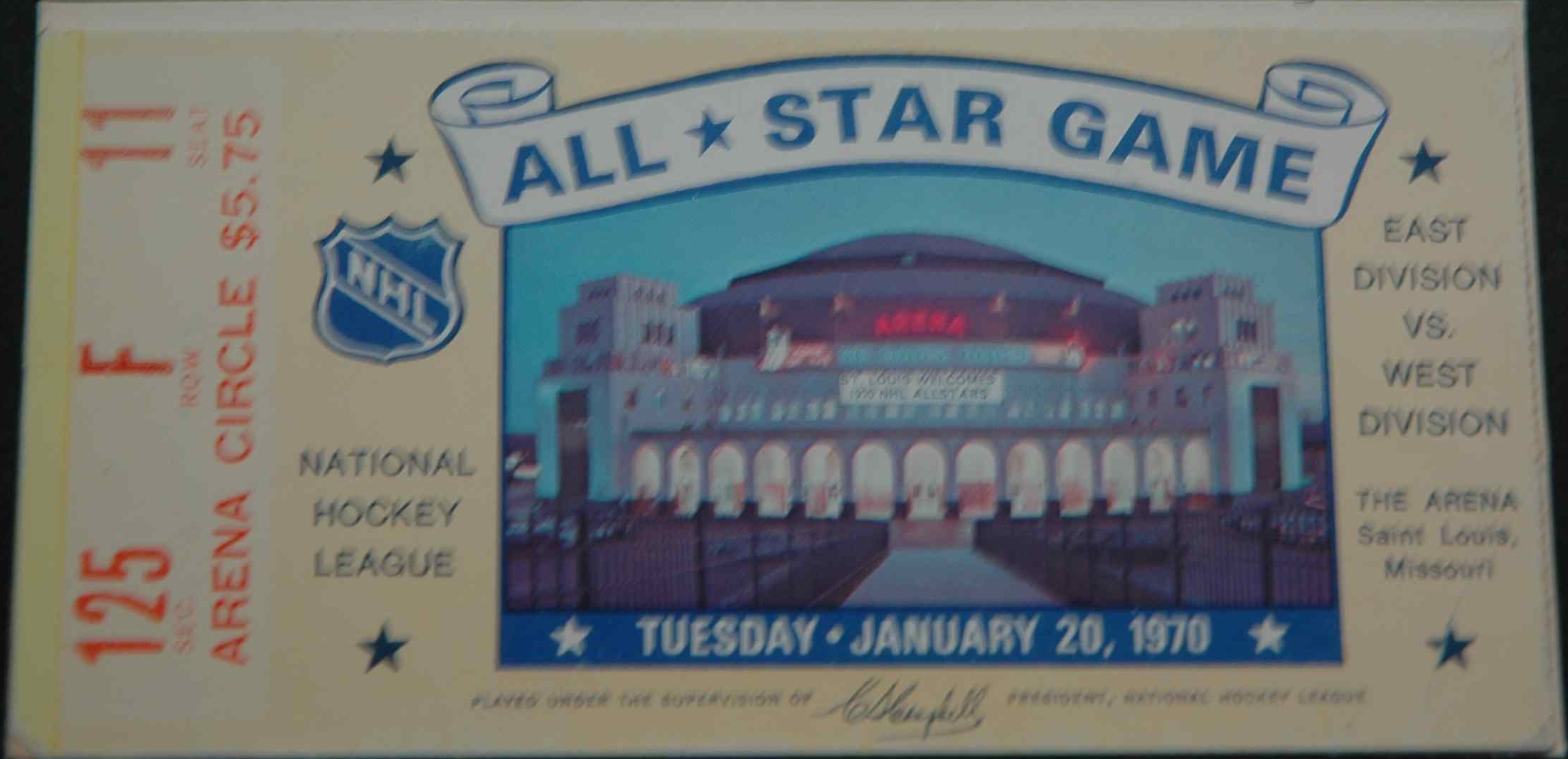

The 23rd National Hockey League All-Star Game was held in the St. Louis Arena in St. Louis, home of the St. Louis Blues, on January 20, 1970. It was the first time the All-Star Game was held at the St. Louis Arena. The East Division All-Stars defeated the West Division All-Stars 4–1. Bobby Hull was named the game's most valuable player.

It was also the first NHL All-Star Game carried live on American network television, airing on CBS.

== League business ==
Clarence Campbell, president of the NHL, announced that the NHL All-Star Game will be held in Boston in 1971, in Minnesota in 1972, and in New York City in 1973. He also announced that the NHL would expand to Buffalo and Vancouver for the next season.

== The game ==
It was the first time the game had been held outside of the Stanley Cup champion's home rink since the 1948 game in Chicago. Brad Park, Bobby Clarke and Tony Esposito were the only three players making their first appearance in the game. Clarke was substituting for Phil Goyette, who had a knee injury.

=== Summary ===
#	Score	Team	Goalscorer (assist(s))	Time
First period
		East	Goaltender in: Giacomin	0:00
		West	Goaltender in: Parent	0:00
1	1–0	East	Goal: Laperriere (unassisted)	0:20
2	1–1	West	Goal: Prentice (Berenson, Woytowich)	0:37
	1–1	East	Penalty: Park	1:52
	1–1	West	Penalty: St. Marseille	6:00
3	2–1	East	Goal: Howe (Hull, Lemaire) PPG	7:20
Second period
4	3–1	East	Goal: Hull (Brewer)	1:53
5	4–1	East	Goal: Tkaczuk (McKenzie, Bucyk)	9:37
	4–1	East	Goaltender out: Giacomin; Goaltender in: Esposito	9:37
	4–1	West	Goaltender out: Parent; Goaltender in: Plante	9:37
	4–1	West	Penalty: Woytowich	15:47
Third period
	4–1	West	Penalty: Woytowich	2:12
Goaltenders
East: Giacomin (29:37 minutes), Esposito (30:23 minutes).; West: Parent (29:37 minutes), Plante (30:23 minutes).
Shots on goal
East (44) 10 – 14 – 20; West (17) 6 – 5 – 6
Officials
Referee: Art Skov Linesmen: Claude Bechard, Matt Pavelich

Source: Podnieks

== Team lineups ==
=== East Division All-Stars ===
- Coach: Claude Ruel (Montreal Canadiens)

#	Nat.	Player	Pos.	Team
Goaltenders
1	(Canada)	Ed Giacomin		New York Rangers
30	(Canada)	Tony Esposito		Chicago Black Hawks
Defencemen
2	(Canada)	Jacques Laperriere		Montreal Canadiens
3	(Canada)	Brad Park		New York Rangers
4	(Canada)	Bobby Orr		Boston Bruins
5	(Canada)	Carl Brewer		Detroit Red Wings
18	(Canada)	Serge Savard		Montreal Canadiens
Forwards
7	(Canada)	Phil Esposito	C	Boston Bruins
8	(Canada)	Johnny Bucyk	LW	Boston Bruins
9	(Canada)	Gordie Howe	RW	Detroit Red Wings
10	(Canada)	Jean Ratelle	C	New York Rangers
11	(Canada)	Walt Tkaczuk	C	New York Rangers
12	(Canada)	Ron Ellis	RW	Toronto Maple Leafs
14	(Canada)	Dave Keon	C	Toronto Maple Leafs
15	(Canada)	Jacques Lemaire	LW	Montreal Canadiens
16	(Canada)	Bobby Hull	LW	Chicago Black Hawks
17	(Canada)	Rod Gilbert	RW	New York Rangers
21	(Canada)	John McKenzie	RW	Boston Bruins
27	(Canada)	Frank Mahovlich	LW	Detroit Red Wings

=== West Division All-Stars ===
- Coach: Scotty Bowman (St. Louis Blues)

#	Nat.	Player	Pos.	Team
Goaltenders
29	(Canada)	Bernie Parent		Philadelphia Flyers
30	(Canada)	Jacques Plante		St. Louis Blues
Defencemen
2	(Canada)	Bill White		Los Angeles Kings
4	(Canada)	Carol Vadnais		Oakland Seals
5	(Canada)	Bob Woytowich		Pittsburgh Penguins
6	(Canada)	Harry Howell		Oakland Seals
8	(Canada)	Barclay Plager		St. Louis Blues
Forwards
7	(Canada)	Red Berenson	C	St. Louis Blues
9	(Canada)	Frank St. Marseille	C	St. Louis Blues
10	(Canada)	Bobby Clarke	C	Philadelphia Flyers
11	(Canada)	J. P. Parise	LW	Minnesota North Stars
12	(Canada)	Dean Prentice	LW	Pittsburgh Penguins
14	(Canada)	Jim Roberts	RW	St. Louis Blues
15	(Canada)	Danny O'Shea	C	Minnesota North Stars
16	(Canada)	Claude Larose	RW	Minnesota North Stars
17	(Canada)	Gary Sabourin	RW	St. Louis Blues
20	(Canada)	Ab McDonald	LW	St. Louis Blues
21	(Canada)	Bill Goldsworthy	RW	Minnesota North Stars
22	(Canada)	Danny Grant	LW	Minnesota North Stars

C = center; LW/RW = left wing/right wing.

Source: Podnieks

== See also ==
- 1969–70 NHL season
