= 26th National Hockey League All-Star Game =

Professional ice hockey exhibition game

26th NHL All-Star Game
	1	2	3	Total
West	0	2	2	4
East	0	3	2	5
- Date: January 30, 1973
- Arena: Madison Square Garden
- City: New York City
- MVP: Greg Polis (Pittsburgh)
- Attendance: 16,986

The 26th National Hockey League All-Star Game was held in the Madison Square Garden in New York City, home of the New York Rangers, on January 30, 1973. It was the first time that the All-Star Game was held in New York. The East Division All-Stars defeated the West Division All-Stars 5–4. Greg Polis was named the game's most valuable player.

== League business ==
Clarence Campbell, president of the NHL announced that the NHL was expanding to Kansas City and Washington, D.C.

== Lineups ==
=== East Division All-Stars ===
- Coach: Tom Johnson (Boston Bruins)

#	Nat.	Player	Pos.	Team
Goaltenders
1	(Canada)	Ed Giacomin		New York Rangers
30	(Canada)	Gilles Villemure		New York Rangers
Defencemen
2	(Canada)	Brad Park		New York Rangers
3	(Canada)	Gary Bergman		Detroit Red Wings
4	(Canada)	Bobby Orr		Boston Bruins
5	(Canada)	Guy Lapointe		Montreal Canadiens
18	(Canada)	Serge Savard		Montreal Canadiens
20	(Canada)	Dallas Smith		Boston Bruins
Forwards
6	(Canada)	Rick Martin	LW	Buffalo Sabres
7	(Canada)	Phil Esposito	C	Boston Bruins
8	(Canada)	Ken Hodge	RW	Boston Bruins
9	(Canada)	Bobby Schmautz	RW	Vancouver Canucks
12	(Canada)	Yvan Cournoyer	RW	Montreal Canadiens
14	(Canada)	Dave Keon	C	Toronto Maple Leafs
15	(Canada)	Rene Robert	RW	Buffalo Sabres
17	(Canada)	Ed Westfall	RW	New York Islanders
19	(Canada)	Jean Ratelle	C	New York Rangers
21	(Canada)	Paul Henderson	LW	Toronto Maple Leafs
25	(Canada)	Jacques Lemaire	C	Montreal Canadiens
27	(Canada)	Frank Mahovlich	LW	Montreal Canadiens

=== West Division All-Stars ===
- Coach: Billy Reay (Chicago Black Hawks)

#	Nat.	Player	Pos.	Team
Goaltenders
1	(Canada)	Tony Esposito		Chicago Black Hawks
30	(Canada)	Rogie Vachon		Los Angeles Kings
Defencemen
2	(Canada)	Bill White		Chicago Black Hawks
3	(Canada)	Terry Harper		Los Angeles Kings
4	(Canada)	Gilles Marotte		Los Angeles Kings
5	(Canada)	Barry Gibbs		Minnesota North Stars
6	(Canada)	Barclay Plager		St. Louis Blues
14	(Canada)	Randy Manery		Atlanta Flames
Forwards
7	(Canada)	Pit Martin	C	Chicago Black Hawks
8	(Canada)	Jim Pappin	RW	Chicago Black Hawks
9	(Canada)	Garry Unger	C	St. Louis Blues
10	(Canada)	Dennis Hull	LW	Chicago Black Hawks
11	(Canada)	J. P. Parise	LW	Minnesota North Stars
12	(Canada)	Gary Dornhoefer	RW	Philadelphia Flyers
16	(Canada)	Bobby Clarke	C	Philadelphia Flyers
17	(Canada)	Bob Berry	LW	Los Angeles Kings
21	(Canada)	Stan Mikita	C	Chicago Black Hawks
22	(Canada)	Greg Polis	LW	Pittsburgh Penguins
23	(Canada)	Joey Johnston	LW	California Golden Seals
26	(Canada)	Lowell MacDonald	$W	Pittsburgh Penguins

G = Goaltenders; D = Defenceman; C = Center; LW/RW = Left Wing/Right Wing

Source: Podnieks

== Game summary ==
#	Score	Team	Goalscorer (Assist(s))	Time
First period
No scoring
Penalties : Orr(East) 11:11, Bergman(East) 14:52
Second period
1	1-0	West	Polis (Clarke, MacDonald)	0:55
2	1-1	East	Robert (Park)	3:56
3	1-2	East	Mahovlich (unassisted)	16:27
4	1-3	East	Henderson (Esposito, Hodge)	19:12
5	2-3	West	P. Martin (Hull, Pappin)	19:29
Penalties : Hodge(East) 6:26
Third period
6	2-4	East	Lemaire (Mahovlich, Lapointe)	3:19
7	3–4	West	Polis (Harper)	4:27
8	4–4	West	Harper (Mikita)	9:27
9	4-5	East	Schmautz (Savard)	13:59
Penalties : White(West) 10:03

Goaltenders :

- East: Villemure (29:16 minutes), Giacomin (30:44 minutes).
- West: T. Esposito (29:16 minutes), Vachon (30:44 minutes).

Shots on goal :

- East (34) 18 - 9 - 9
- West (30) 8 - 10 - 12

Referee : Bill Friday

Linesmen : Neil Armstrong, John D'Amico

Source: Podnieks

== See also ==
- 1972–73 NHL season
