= 24th National Hockey League All-Star Game =

Professional ice hockey exhibition game

24th NHL All-Star Game
	1	2	3	Total
West	2	0	0	2
East	1	0	0	1
- Date: January 19, 1971
- Arena: Boston Garden
- City: Boston
- MVP: Bobby Hull (Chicago)
- Attendance: 14,790

The 24th National Hockey League All-Star Game was held in the Boston Garden in Boston, home of the Boston Bruins. This was the first time that the all-star game was held in Boston. The West Division All-Stars defeated the East Division All-Stars 2–1. The West's Bobby Hull was named the game's most valuable player.

== Uniforms ==
The West Division All-Stars continued to use the blue uniforms introduced in 1969. The East Division team, however, received updated white uniforms. The waistline color was changed from black to orange; the stars on the upper chest were enlarged, and had the NHL shield added inside them; the NHL shield was also added to the shoulders; the black numbers gained an orange outline; and the collar changed from an orange tie-up design to a black and orange V-neck.

== The game ==
=== Game summary ===
#	Score	Team	Goalscorer (Assist(s))	Time
First period
1	1-0	West	Maki (unassisted)	0:36
2	2-0	West	B. Hull (Flett) PPG	4:38
3	2-1	East	Cournoyer (Smith, Balon)	6:19
Penalties : Harris (West) 2:17, F. Mahovlich (East) 3:09, B. Hull (West) 11:14
Second period
Penalties : Bucyk(East) 1:22
Third period
Penalties : Stapleton(West) 2:48, Magnuson(West) 8:34

Goaltenders :

- East: Giacomin (30:41 minutes), Villemure (29:19 minutes).
- West: T. Esposito (30:41 minutes), Wakely (29:19 minutes).

Shots on goal :

- West (28) 13 - 8 - 7
- East (27) 13 - 12 - 2

Referee : Bill Friday

Linesmen : Neil Armstrong, John D'Amico

Source: Podnieks

== Rosters ==
East Division All-Stars

- Coach: Harry Sinden (Boston Bruins)

#	Nat.	Player	Pos.	Team
Goaltenders
1	(Canada)	Ed Giacomin		New York Rangers
30	(Canada)	Gilles Villemure		New York Rangers
Defencemen
2	(Canada)	Brad Park		New York Rangers
3	(Canada)	J. C. Tremblay		Montreal Canadiens
4	(Canada)	Bobby Orr		Boston Bruins
5	(Canada)	Dale Tallon		Vancouver Canucks
15	(Canada)	Jim Neilson		New York Rangers
20	(Canada)	Dallas Smith		Boston Bruins
Forwards
6	(Canada)	Johnny Bucyk	LW	Boston Bruins
7	(Canada)	Phil Esposito	C	Boston Bruins
8	(Canada)	Ken Hodge	RW	Boston Bruins
9	(Canada)	Gordie Howe	RW	Detroit Red Wings
10	(Canada)	Ed Westfall *	RW	Boston Bruins
11	(Canada)	Gilbert Perreault	C	Buffalo Sabres
12	(Canada)	Yvan Cournoyer	RW	Montreal Canadiens
14	(Canada)	Dave Keon	C	Toronto Maple Leafs
17	(Canada)	Dave Balon	LW	New York Rangers
18	(Canada)	Jean Ratelle	C	New York Rangers
21	(Canada)	Peter Mahovlich	C	Montreal Canadiens
27	(Canada)	Frank Mahovlich	LW	Montreal Canadiens

West Division All-Stars

- Coach: Scotty Bowman (St. Louis Blues)

#	Nat.	Player	Pos.	Team
Goaltenders
30	(Canada)	Ernie Wakely		St. Louis Blues
35	(Canada)	Tony Esposito		Chicago Black Hawks
Defencemen
2	(Canada)	Bill White		Chicago Black Hawks
3	(Canada)	Keith Magnuson		Chicago Black Hawks
4	(Canada)	Ted Harris		Minnesota North Stars
5	(United States)	Doug Roberts		California Golden Seals
8	(Canada)	Barclay Plager		St. Louis Blues
12	(Canada)	Pat Stapleton		Chicago Black Hawks
Forwards
6	(Canada)	Pit Martin	C	Chicago Black Hawks
7	(Canada)	Red Berenson	C	St. Louis Blues
9	(Canada)	Bobby Hull	LW	Chicago Black Hawks
10	(Canada)	Dennis Hull	LW	Chicago Black Hawks
11	(Canada)	Gary Sabourin	RW	St. Louis Blues
14	(Canada)	Tim Ecclestone	LW	St. Louis Blues
15	(Canada)	Bobby Clarke	C	Philadelphia Flyers
16	(Canada)	Chico Maki	RW	Chicago Black Hawks
17	(Canada)	Bill Flett	RW	Los Angeles Kings
20	(Canada)	Danny Grant	LW	Minnesota North Stars
21	(Canada)	Stan Mikita	C	Chicago Black Hawks
22	(Canada)	Greg Polis +	LW	Pittsburgh Penguins

G = Goaltenders; D = Defencemen; C = Center; LW/RW = Left Wing/Right Wing

Source: Podnieks

* Westfall was named as an injury replacement for Bruins right wing John McKenzie, who had been named but was injured. + Polis was named to replace Penguins right wing Ken Schinkel, who had been named but was injured.

== See also ==
- 1970–71 NHL season
