= List of Atlanta Flames players =

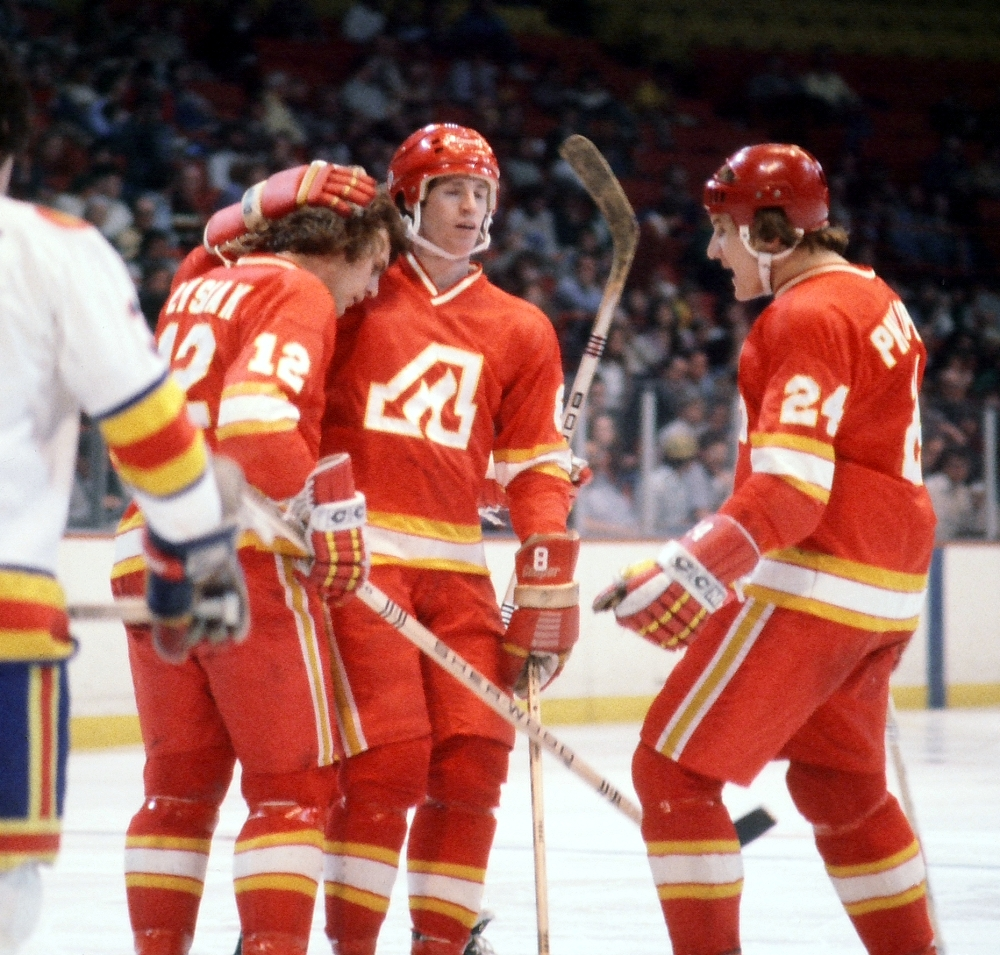
Tom Lysiak (l.) celebrates with Dave Shand and Harold Phillipoff after a goal against the Colorado Rockies in 1978.

This is a complete list of ice hockey players who played for the Atlanta Flames in the National Hockey League (NHL). It includes players that have played at least one regular season or playoff game for the Atlanta Flames from their founding in 1972 until their relocation to Calgary in 1980. A total of 93 players wore the "Flaming A" — six goaltenders and 88 skaters. Three players captured individual awards during their time in Atlanta: Eric Vail (1975) and Willi Plett (1977) won the Calder Memorial Trophy as rookie of the year, while Bob MacMillan won the Lady Byng Trophy as the most gentlemanly player in the NHL in 1979.

The Atlanta Flames all-time leading scorer was Tom Lysiak, who recorded 431 points in six seasons in Atlanta. Vail led the team in goals with 174. Goaltender Dan Bouchard was the team's top goaltender. A Flame for all eight seasons the team called Atlanta home, Bouchard won 164 games, while posting a team best 3.00 career goals against average in Atlanta.

== Key ==
Abbreviations
C	Center
D	Defenseman
L	Left wing
R	Right wing

Goaltenders
W	Wins
L	Losses
T	Ties
SO	Shutouts
GAA	Goals against average
SV%	Save percentage

Skaters
GP	Games played
G	Goals
A	Assists
Pts	Points
PIM	Penalty minutes

== Skaters ==
			Regular season					Playoffs				
Player	Position	Years	GP	G	A	Pts	PIM	GP	G	A	Pts	PIM
Rick Adduono	C	1979–1980	3	0	0	0	2	—	—	—	—	—
Ernest Arnason	R	1973–1974	33	7	6	13	13	—	—	—	—	—
Serge Beaudoin	D	1979–1980	3	0	0	0	0	—	—	—	—	—
Curt Bennett	R	1972–1980	405	126	140	266	190	9	1	1	2	45
Dwight Bialowas	D	1973–1975	48	3	9	12	22	—	—	—	—	—
Ivan Boldirev	C	1978–1980	65	22	32	54	26	2	0	2	2	2
Cam Botting	R	1975–1976	2	0	1	1	0	—	—	—	—	—
Richard Bowness	R	1975–1977	33	0	4	4	29	—	—	—	—	—
Arnie Brown	D	1972–1974	63	3	6	9	46	4	0	0	0	0
Jerry Byers	L	1974–1975	12	1	1	2	9	—	—	—	—	—
Gene Carr	C	1978–1979	30	3	8	11	6	1	0	0	0	0
Larry Carriere	D	1975–1977	100	6	18	24	112	2	0	0	0	2
Guy Chouinard	C	1974–1980	318	126	168	294	56	13	5	5	10	4
Bill Clement	C	1975–1980	297	69	107	176	136	13	1	2	3	6
Reynald Comeau	C	1972–1978	468	88	126	214	153	9	2	1	3	8
Butch Deadmarsh	L	1972–1974	61	7	1	8	97	4	0	0	0	17
Tim Ecclestone	L	1974–1978	220	28	62	90	92	4	0	2	2	6
William Flett	R	1975–1977	102	27	21	48	36	2	0	0	0	0
Gregory Fox	D	1977–1979	80	1	14	15	95	2	0	1	1	8
Barry Gibbs	D	1974–1978	208	13	55	68	218	5	1	0	1	4
David Gorman	R	1979–1980	3	0	0	0	0	—	—	—	—	—
John Gould	R	1976–1979	194	35	50	85	47	7	0	0	0	4
Robert Gould	R	1979–1980	1	0	0	0	0	—	—	—	—	—
Norm Gratton	L	1972–1973	29	3	6	9	12	—	—	—	—	—
Hilliard Graves	R	1974–1977	172	37	54	91	63	2	0	0	0	0
Ron Harris	D	1972–1973	24	2	4	6	8	—	—	—	—	—
Buster Harvey	R	1974–1976	80	17	27	44	16	—	—	—	—	—
Paul Henderson	L	1979–1980	30	7	6	13	6	4	0	0	0	0
Bryan Hextall Jr.	C	1973–1975	114	20	20	40	117	4	0	1	1	16
Ernest Hicke	L	1972–1973	58	14	23	37	37	—	—	—	—	—
Bill Hogaboam	C	1972–1973	2	0	0	0	0	—	—	—	—	—
Kenneth Houston	R	1975–1980	350	91	108	199	332	12	1	1	2	30
Earl Ingarfield	C	1979–1980	1	0	0	0	0	2	0	1	1	0
Adrian Kea	D	1973–1979	316	22	92	114	283	8	0	1	1	9
Kerry Ketter	D	1972–1973	41	0	2	2	58	—	—	—	—	—
Dave Kryskow	L	1975–1976	79	15	25	40	65	2	0	0	0	2
Robert Lalonde	C	1977–1980	154	38	56	94	54	3	2	0	2	0
Donald Laurence	C	1978–1979	59	14	20	34	6	—	—	—	—	—
Bobby Leiter	C	1972–1976	234	64	81	145	41	4	0	0	0	2
Jean Lemieux	D	1973–1976	140	10	38	48	35	3	1	1	2	0
Rich Lemieux	C	1975–1976	1	0	1	1	0	2	0	0	0	0
Donald Lever	C	1979–1980	28	14	16	30	4	4	1	1	2	0
Thomas Lysiak	C	1973–1979	445	155	276	431	329	11	2	5	7	12
Bob MacMillan	R	1977–1980	208	90	131	221	50	8	0	3	3	9
Billy MacMillan	R	1972–1973	78	10	15	25	52	—	—	—	—	—
Randy Manery	D	1972–1977	377	30	142	172	242	9	0	2	2	4
Charles Marsh	D	1978–1980	160	2	28	30	220	6	0	1	1	19
Don Martineau	R	1973–1974	4	0	0	0	2	—	—	—	—	—
Keith McCreary	R	1972–1975	231	49	50	99	91	4	0	0	0	0
Al McDonough	R	1973–1974	35	10	9	19	15	4	0	0	0	2
Gerry Meehan	C	1974–1976	62	11	30	41	8	—	—	—	—	—
Vic Mercredi	C	1974–1975	2	0	0	0	0	—	—	—	—	—
Doug Mohns	L	1973–1974	28	0	3	3	10	—	—	—	—	—
Lew Morrison	R	1972–1974	130	7	13	20	19	—	—	—	—	—
Richard Mulhern	D	1975–1979	207	25	67	92	153	5	0	3	3	5
Robert Murdoch	D	1978–1980	115	10	27	37	72	6	1	1	2	6
Bob Murray	D	1973–1975	104	3	6	9	56	4	1	0	1	2
Kent Nilsson	C	1979–1980	80	40	53	93	10	4	0	0	0	2
Gerry O'Flaherty	L	1978–1979	1	1	0	1	2	—	—	—	—	—
Robert Paradise	D	1972–1974	89	1	8	9	116	—	—	—	—	—
Harold Phillipoff	L	1977–1979	118	26	53	79	241	2	0	1	1	2
Noel Picard	D	1972–1973	41	0	10	10	43	—	—	—	—	—
Bill Plager	D	1972–1973	76	2	11	13	92	—	—	—	—	—
Willi Plett	R	1975–1980	296	91	83	174	738	9	3	0	3	63
Noel Price	D	1972–1976	199	5	40	45	160	4	0	0	0	6
Joseph Pronovost	R	1978–1980	155	52	58	110	42	6	2	0	2	2
Pat Quinn	D	1972–1977	374	12	87	99	555	7	0	1	1	8
Pekka Rautakallio	D	1979–1980	79	5	25	30	18	4	0	1	1	2
Richard Redmond	D	1977–1978	42	7	11	18	16	2	1	0	1	0
Paul Reinhart	D	1979–1980	79	9	38	47	31	—	—	—	—	—
Patrick Ribble	D	1975–1979	172	12	30	42	168	4	0	1	1	8
Jacques Richard	L	1972–1975	215	57	46	103	108	4	0	0	0	2
Leon Rochefort	R	1972–1974	110	19	30	49	23	—	—	—	—	—
Larry Romanchych	R	1972–1977	288	68	95	163	100	7	2	2	4	4
Darcy Rota	L	1978–1980	57	19	13	32	70	2	0	1	1	26
Philip Russell	D	1978–1980	93	6	37	43	143	6	0	1	1	15
Rod Seiling	D	1978–1979	36	0	4	4	12	2	0	0	0	0
David Shand	D	1976–1980	288	14	63	77	324	11	0	1	1	57
Robert Simpson	L	1976–1978	127	23	18	41	94	4	0	1	1	2
Brad Smith	R	1979–1980	4	0	0	0	4	—	—	—	—	—
Claude St. Sauveur	C	1975–1976	79	24	24	48	23	2	0	0	0	0
Morris Stefaniw	C	1972–1973	13	1	1	2	2	—	—	—	—	—
John Stewart	L	1972–1974	142	35	32	67	71	4	0	0	0	10
Dean Talafous	C	1974–1975	18	1	4	5	13	—	—	—	—	—
Garry Unger	C	1979–1980	79	17	16	33	39	4	0	3	3	2
Eric Vail	L	1973–1980	469	174	209	383	223	14	5	6	11	6
Gordon Wappel	D	1979–1980	2	0	0	0	0	2	0	0	0	4
Miles Zaharko	D	1977–1978	71	1	19	20	26	1	0	0	0	0

== Goaltenders ==
		Regular season							Playoffs					
Player	Years	GP	W	L	T	SO	GAA	SV%	GP	W	L	SO	GAA	SV%
Yves Belanger	1977–1979	22	8	10	0	1	4.08	—	—	—	—	—	—	—
Daniel Bouchard	1972–1980	384	164	134	72	20	3.00	—	12	1	11	0	3.59	—
James Craig	1979–1980	4	1	2	1	0	3.79	—	—	—	—	—	—	—
Rejean Lemelin	1978–1980	21	8	10	1	0	3.67	—	1	0	0	0	0	—
Louis Myre	1972–1978	211	76	95	32	11	3.21	—	5	1	4	0	3.53	—
Patrick Riggin	1979–1980	25	11	9	2	2	3.20	—	—	—	—	—	—	—
