= List of Atlanta Flames draft picks =

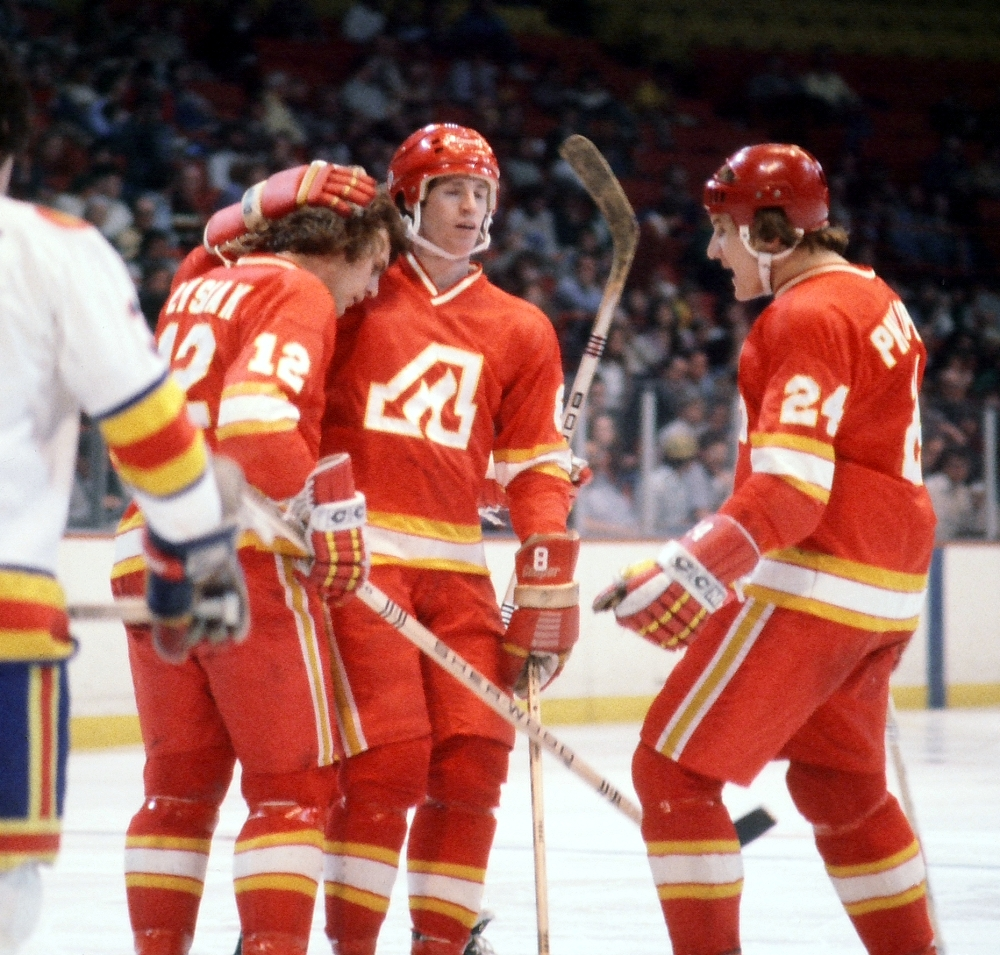
Tom Lysiak, David Shand, and Harold Phillipoff celebrate after scoring a goal. All three were first-round draft picks of the Flames.

This is a complete list of ice hockey players who were drafted in the National Hockey League Entry Draft by the Atlanta Flames franchise. It includes every player who was drafted, from 1972 to 1979, regardless of whether they played for the team.

== Key ==
# Played at least one game with the Flames
↑ Spent entire NHL career with the Flames

General terms and abbreviations
Term or abbreviation	Definition
Draft	The year that the player was selected
Round	The round of the draft in which the player was selected
Pick	The overall position in the draft at which the player was selected

Position abbreviations
Abbreviation	Definition
G	Goaltender
D	Defense
LW	Left wing
C	Center
RW	Right wing
F	Forward

Abbreviations for statistical columns
Abbreviation	Definition
Pos	Position
GP	Games played
G	Goals
A	Assists
Pts	Points
PIM	Penalties in minutes
W	Wins
L	Losses
T	Ties
GAA	Goals against average
—	Does not apply

== Draft picks ==
Draft	Round	Pick	Player	Nationality	Pos	GP	G	A	Pts	PIM	W	L	T	GAA
1972	1	2	Jacques Richard#	Canada	C	556	160	187	347	307	—	—	—	—
1972	2	18	Dwight Bialowas#	Canada	D	164	11	46	57	46	—	—	—	—
1972	3	34	Jean Lemieux#	Canada	D	204	23	63	86	39	—	—	—	—
1972	4	50	Don Martineau#	Canada	RW	90	6	10	16	63	—	—	—	—
1972	5	78	John Martin	Canada	C	—	—	—	—	—	—	—	—	—
1972	6	82	Frank Blum	Canada	G	—	—	—	—	—	—	—	—	—
1972	7	98	Scott Smith	Canada	LW	—	—	—	—	—	—	—	—	—
1972	8	114	Dave Murphy	Canada	C	—	—	—	—	—	—	—	—	—
1972	9	130	Pierre Roy	Canada	D	—	—	—	—	—	—	—	—	—
1972	9	132	Jean Lamarre	Canada	RW	—	—	—	—	—	—	—	—	—
1973	1	2	Tom Lysiak#	Canada	F	919	292	551	843	569	—	—	—	—
1973	1	16	Vic Mercredi↑	Canada	LW	2	0	0	0	0	—	—	—	—
1973	2	21	Eric Vail#	Canada	F	591	216	260	476	281	—	—	—	—
1973	4	53	Dean Talafous#	United States	F	497	104	154	258	163	—	—	—	—
1973	5	69	John Flesch	Canada	LW	124	18	23	41	112	—	—	—	—
1973	6	85	Ken Houston#	Canada	D	570	161	167	328	624	—	—	—	—
1973	7	101	Tom Machowski	United States	D	—	—	—	—	—	—	—	—	—
1973	8	117	Bob Law	Canada	RW	—	—	—	—	—	—	—	—	—
1973	9	133	Bob Bilodeau	Canada	D	—	—	—	—	—	—	—	—	—
1973	10	148	Glen Surbey	Canada	D	—	—	—	—	—	—	—	—	—
1973	10	149	Guy Ross	Canada	D	—	—	—	—	—	—	—	—	—
1973	11	162	Greg Fox#	Canada	D	494	14	93	107	637	—	—	—	—
1974	2	28	Guy Chouinard#	Canada	F	578	205	370	575	120	—	—	—	—
1974	3	46	Dick Spannbauer	United States	D	—	—	—	—	—	—	—	—	—
1974	4	58	Pat Ribble#	Canada	D	349	19	60	79	365	—	—	—	—
1974	4	64	Cam Botting↑	Canada	RW	2	0	1	1	0	—	—	—	—
1974	5	82	Jerry Badiuk	Canada	D	—	—	—	—	—	—	—	—	—
1974	6	100	Bill Moen	United States	G	—	—	—	—	—	—	—	—	—
1974	7	118	Peter Brown	United States	D	—	—	—	—	—	—	—	—	—
1974	8	135	Tom Lindskog	Canada	D	—	—	—	—	—	—	—	—	—
1974	9	152	Larry Hopkins	Canada	LW	60	13	16	29	26	—	—	—	—
1974	10	167	Louis Loranger	Canada	F	—	—	—	—	—	—	—	—	—
1974	11	182	Randy Montgomery	Canada	LW	—	—	—	—	—	—	—	—	—
1975	1	8	Richard Mulhern#	Canada	D	303	27	93	120	217	—	—	—	—
1975	2	26	Rick Bowness#	Canada	C	173	18	37	55	191	—	—	—	—
1975	4	62	Dale Ross	Canada	F	—	—	—	—	—	—	—	—	—
1975	5	80	Willi Plett#	Canada	RW	834	222	215	437	2572	—	—	—	—
1975	6	98	Paul Heaver	Canada	D	—	—	—	—	—	—	—	—	—
1975	7	116	Dale McMullin	Canada	LW	—	—	—	—	—	—	—	—	—
1975	8	134	Rick Piche	Canada	D	—	—	—	—	—	—	—	—	—
1975	9	150	Nick Sanza	Canada	G	—	—	—	—	—	—	—	—	—
1975	10	167	Brian O'Connell	Canada	G	—	—	—	—	—	—	—	—	—
1975	11	181	Joe Augustine	United States	D	—	—	—	—	—	—	—	—	—
1975	12	192	Torbjorn Nilsson	Sweden	F	—	—	—	—	—	—	—	—	—
1975	16	216	Gary Gill	Canada	F	—	—	—	—	—	—	—	—	—
1976	1	8	David Shand#	Canada	D	421	19	84	103	544	—	—	—	—
1976	1	10	Harold Phillipoff#	Canada	W	141	26	57	83	267	—	—	—	—
1976	2	28	Bobby Simpson#	Canada	LW	175	35	29	64	98	—	—	—	—
1976	3	46	Rick Hodgson	Canada	D	6	0	0	0	6	—	—	—	—
1976	4	64	Kent Nilsson#	Sweden	F	553	264	422	686	116	—	—	—	—
1976	5	82	Mark Earp	Canada	G	—	—	—	—	—	—	—	—	—
1977	2	20	Miles Zaharko#	Canada	D	129	5	32	37	84	—	—	—	—
1977	2	28	Don Laurence#	Canada	C	79	15	22	37	14	—	—	—	—
1977	2	31	Brian Hill	Canada	RW	19	1	1	2	4	—	—	—	—
1977	4	72	Jim Craig#	United States	G	30	0	1	1	11	11	10	7	3.78
1977	5	82	Curt Christopherson	United States	D	—	—	—	—	—	—	—	—	—
1977	6	100	Bernie Harbec	Canada	C	—	—	—	—	—	—	—	—	—
1977	7	118	Bob Gould#	Canada	F	697	145	159	304	572	—	—	—	—
1977	8	133	Jimmy Bennett	United States	LW	—	—	—	—	—	—	—	—	—
1977	9	148	Tim Harrer↑	United States	RW	3	0	0	0	2	—	—	—	—
1978	1	11	Brad Marsh#	Canada	D	1086	23	175	198	1241	—	—	—	—
1978	3	47	Tim Bernhardt#	Canada	G	67	0	3	3	4	17	36	7	4.27
1978	4	64	Jim MacRae	Canada	F	—	—	—	—	—	—	—	—	—
1978	5	80	Gord Wappel↑	Canada	D	20	1	1	2	10	—	—	—	—
1978	6	97	Greg Meredith↑	Canada	F	38	6	4	10	8	—	—	—	—
1978	7	114	Dave Hindmarch↑	Canada	F	99	21	17	38	25	—	—	—	—
1978	8	131	Dave Morrison	Canada	RW	—	—	—	—	—	—	—	—	—
1978	9	148	Doug Todd	Canada	RW	—	—	—	—	—	—	—	—	—
1978	10	165	Mark Green	United States	C	—	—	—	—	—	—	—	—	—
1978	11	180	Bob Sullivan	Canada	LW	62	18	19	37	18	—	—	—	—
1978	12	196	Bernhard Engelbrecht	Germany	G	—	—	—	—	—	—	—	—	—
1979	1	12	Paul Reinhart#	Canada	D	648	133	427	560	277	—	—	—	—
1979	2	23	Mike Perovich	Canada	D	—	—	—	—	—	—	—	—	—
1979	2	33	Pat Riggin#	Canada	G	350	0	8	8	41	153	120	52	3.43
1979	3	54	Tim Hunter#	Canada	F	815	62	76	138	3146	—	—	—	—
1979	4	75	Jim Peplinski↑	Canada	F	711	161	263	424	1467	—	—	—	—
1979	5	96	Brad Kempthorne	Canada	C	—	—	—	—	—	—	—	—	—
1979	6	117	Glenn Johnson	Canada	C	—	—	—	—	—	—	—	—	—

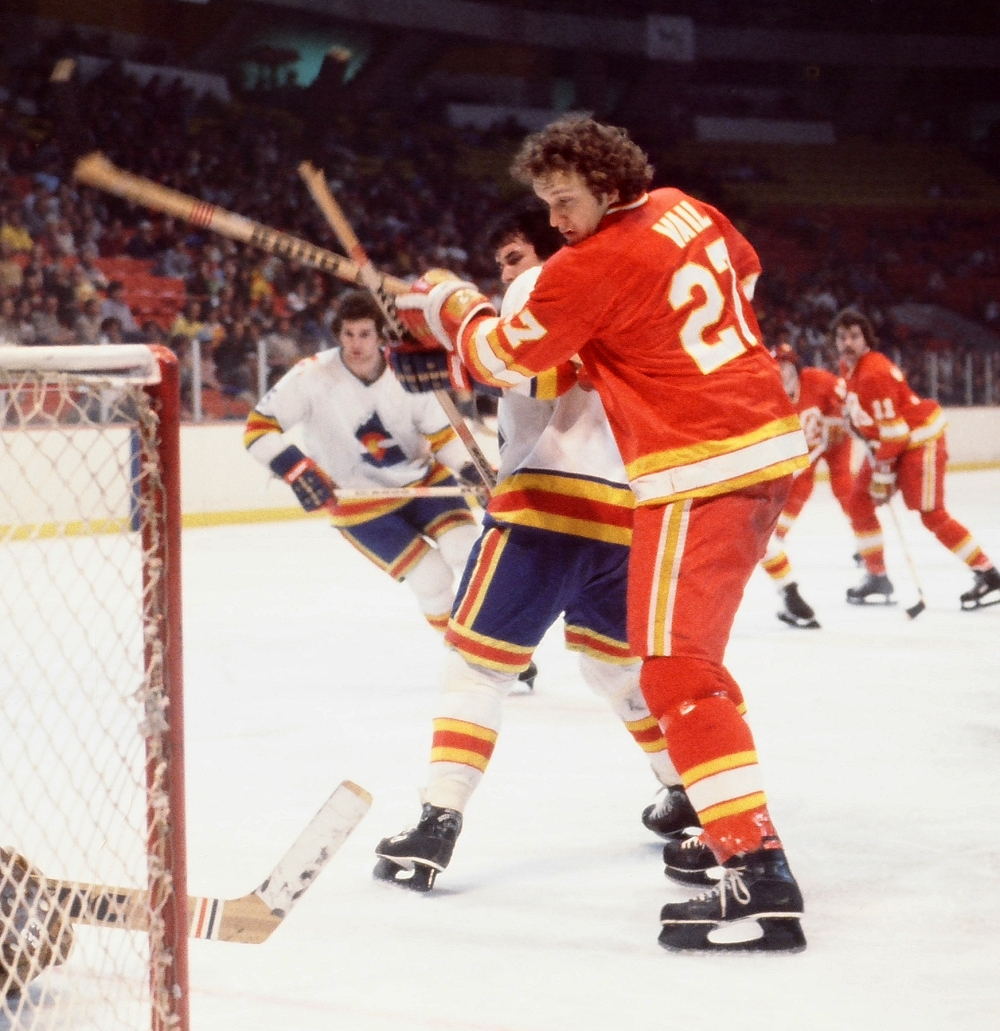
The Flames selected Eric Vail 21st overall in the 1973 NHL Amateur Draft.

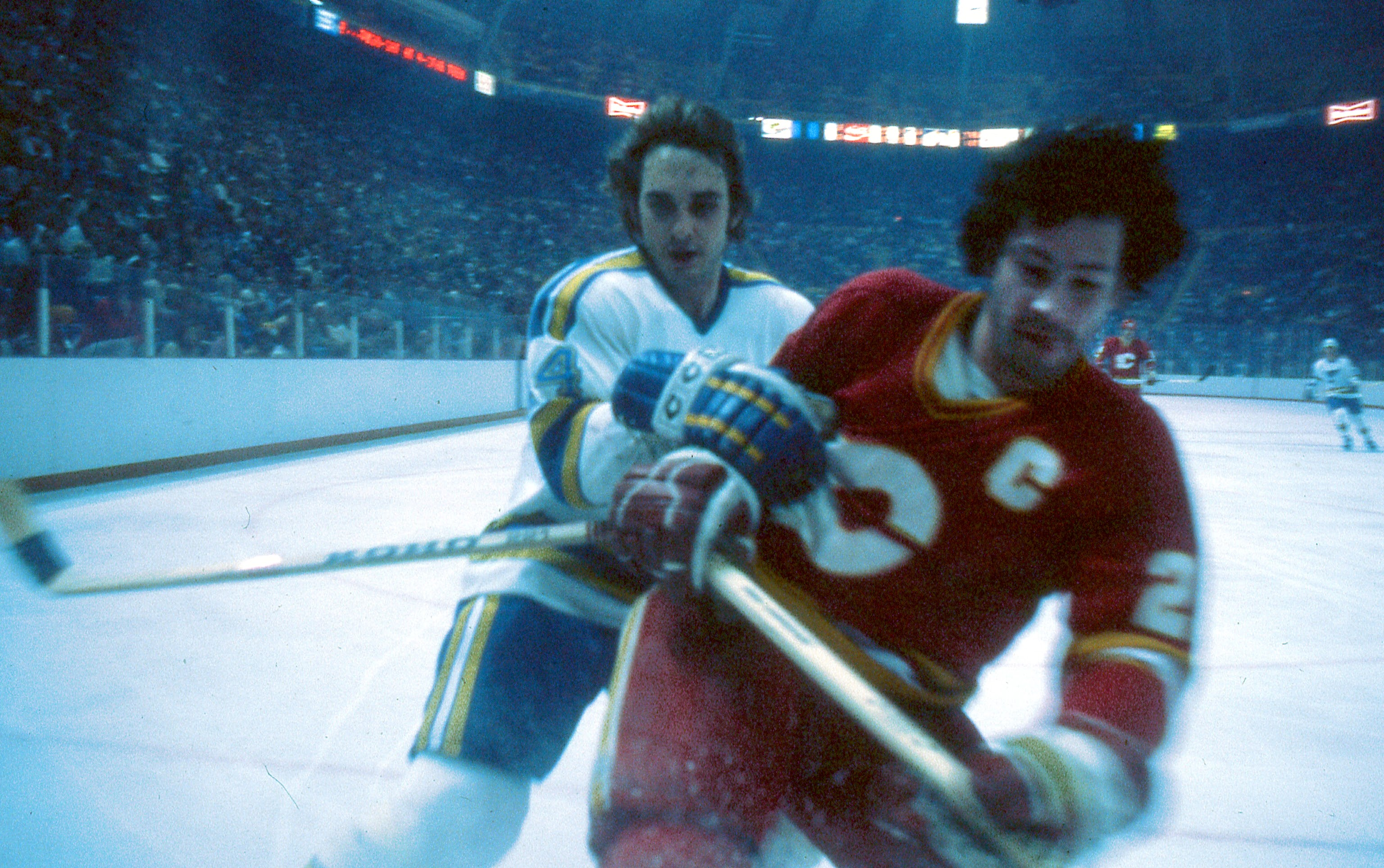
The Flames selected Brad Marsh 11th overall in the 1978 NHL Amateur Draft.

== See also ==
- List of Atlanta Flames players
- 1972 NHL Expansion Draft
- List of Calgary Flames draft picks
