= Ed Thilenius =

American sports announcer (1923–1981)

Edward Albert Thilenius (December 4, 1923 – March 23, 1981) was an American sports announcer.

He served as the play-by-play voice of the University of Georgia Bulldogs football team from 1955 through 1965 and was part of the inaugural Atlanta Falcons radio broadcast team along with Johnny Sauer on CBS Sports televised NFL coverage during the 1966 and 1967 seasons. He also served as the city editor for the Athens Banner-Herald and the sports director for WAGA (TV) in Atlanta, Georgia for 12 years. In 1975, Thilenius became the head of public relations for the Atlanta Flames NHL hockey team.

In 1960, Thilenius co-authored a book about Bulldogs football coach Wally Butts entitled No Ifs, No Ands, A Lot of Butts: 21 Years of Georgia Football.

Thilenius died in 1981 at the age of 57.
