= Vic Mercredi =

Canadian ice hockey player (born 1953)

- Born: March 31, 1953 (age 73) Yellowknife, Northwest Territories, Canada
- Height: 5 ft 11 in (180 cm)
- Weight: 185 lb (84 kg; 13 st 3 lb)
- Position: Left wing
- Shot: Right
- Played for: Atlanta Flames; Calgary Cowboys
- NHL draft: 16th overall, 1973; Atlanta Flames
- WHA draft: 35th overall, 1973; Houston Aeros
- Playing career: 1969–1980

Victor Dennis Mercredi (born March 31, 1953) is a Canadian former professional ice hockey player of Métis heritage. Mercredi played in the National Hockey League (NHL) and World Hockey Association (WHA) as a left winger.

== Hockey career and accomplishments ==
Vic Mercredi's hockey career spanned a decade, from 1969 to 1980. He played for the Penticton Broncos in the British Columbia Junior Hockey League from 1969–71 and the New Westminster Bruins in the Western Canadian Hockey League from 1971-73. Mercredi was drafted 16th overall in the first round of the 1973 NHL Amateur Draft by the Atlanta Flames, and 35th overall in the 1973 WHA Amateur Draft by the Houston Aeros. He played 2 games for Atlanta in the 1974–75 season, and three games for the Calgary Cowboys during the 1975-76 WHA season. He also played for a time in Stockholm, Sweden, on the now defunct Hammarby IF Hockey team. Mercredi was the 1970-71 BCJHL MVP and voted on the BCJHL all-star first team. He was also inducted into the NWT Sport Hall of Fame in 2013 for being the first hockey player born in the Northwest Territories to play in the National Hockey League.

== Political involvement ==
Mercredi ran for public office to the Legislative Assembly of the Northwest Territories in the 2011 Northwest Territories general election in the electoral district of Kam Lake. He finished third out of four candidates, while incumbent Dave Ramsay was re-elected.

== Career statistics ==
=== Regular season and playoffs ===
| | | | Regular season | | | | | Playoffs |
| Season | Team | League | GP | G | A | Pts | PIM | GP | G | A | Pts | PIM |
|---|---|---|---|---|---|---|---|---|---|---|---|---|
| 1969–70 | Penticton Broncos | BCJHL | 48 | 16 | 18 | 34 | — | — | — | — | — | — |
| 1970–71 | Penticton Broncos | BCJHL | 51 | 50 | 56 | 106 | 38 | — | — | — | — | — |
| 1971–72 | New Westminster Bruins | WCHL | 68 | 24 | 30 | 54 | 87 | 5 | 1 | 1 | 2 | 2 |
| 1972–73 | New Westminster Bruins | WCHL | 67 | 52 | 61 | 113 | 135 | 5 | 8 | 4 | 12 | 14 |
| 1973–74 | Omaha Knights | CHL | 68 | 21 | 36 | 57 | 34 | 5 | 1 | 2 | 3 | 2 |
| 1974–75 | Omaha Knights | CHL | 64 | 10 | 16 | 26 | 16 | 6 | 0 | 0 | 0 | 0 |
| 1974–75 | Atlanta Flames | NHL | 2 | 0 | 0 | 0 | 0 | — | — | — | — | — |
| 1975–76 | Baltimore Clippers | AHL | 52 | 6 | 9 | 15 | 15 | — | — | — | — | — |
| 1975–76 | Calgary Cowboys | WHA | 3 | 0 | 0 | 0 | 29 | — | — | — | — | — |
| 1976–77 | Hammarby IF | SWE-2 | 18 | 5 | 9 | 14 | 67 | — | — | — | — | — |
| 1977–78 | Phoenix Roadrunners | PHL | 42 | 16 | 24 | 40 | 48 | — | — | — | — | — |
| 1977–78 | Springfield Indians | AHL | 1 | 0 | 0 | 0 | 0 | — | — | — | — | — |
| 1978–79 | Tucson Rustlers | PHL | 29 | 8 | 20 | 28 | 4 | — | — | — | — | — |
| 1979–80 | Delta Kings | BCSHL | — | — | — | — | — | — | — | — | — | — |
| WHA totals | | | 3 | 0 | 0 | 0 | 29 | — | — | — | — | — |
| NHL totals | | | 2 | 0 | 0 | 0 | 0 | — | — | — | — | — |

| Preceded by Tom Lysiak | Atlanta Flames first-round draft pick 1973 | Succeeded by Richard Mulhern |
