= Richard Mulhern =

Canadian ice hockey player (born 1955)

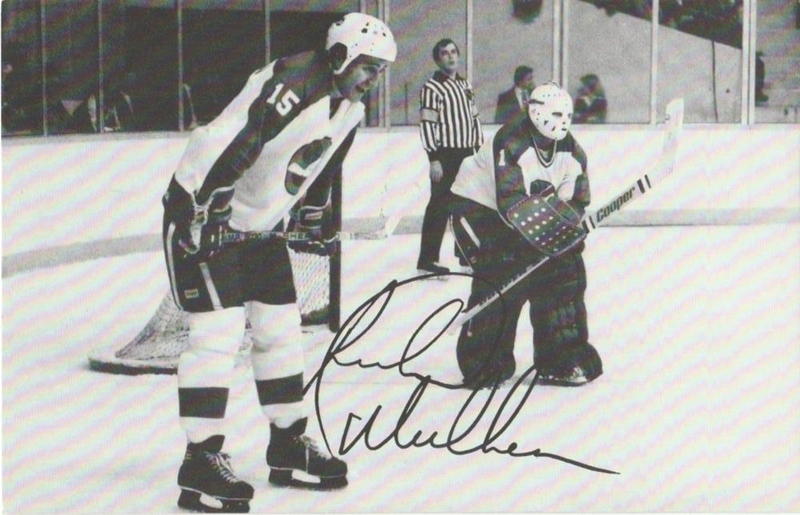
- Mulhern in 1980 photo
- Born: March 1, 1955 (age 71) Edmonton, Alberta, Canada
- Height: 6 ft 1 in (185 cm)
- Weight: 195 lb (88 kg; 13 st 13 lb)
- Position: Defence
- Shot: Left
- Played for: Atlanta Flames; Los Angeles Kings; Toronto Maple Leafs; Winnipeg Jets
- NHL draft: 8th overall, 1975; Atlanta Flames
- WHA draft: 15th overall, 1975; Houston Aeros
- Playing career: 1975–1981

Richard Sidney Mulhern (born March 1, 1955) is a Canadian former professional ice hockey defenceman. Mulhern was born in Edmonton, Alberta and raised in Beaconsfield, Quebec.

Before playing in the NHL, he played for the Sherbrooke Castors. Also, around the end of his career he played with the Tulsa Oilers and Dallas Black Hawks, of the Central Hockey League.

Mulhern started his National Hockey League career with the Atlanta Flames in 1975, after being picked eighth overall in the 1975 Amateur Draft and being first sent to Tulsa where he played 56 games during the 1975–76 season.

He also played for the Toronto Maple Leafs, Los Angeles Kings, and Winnipeg Jets. He retired after the 1981 season, due to declining play, which came from back injuries and surgery.

In his career, he played in 303 NHL games. He scored 27 goals.

== Career statistics ==
| | | | Regular season | | | | | Playoffs |
| Season | Team | League | GP | G | A | Pts | PIM | GP | G | A | Pts | PIM |
|---|---|---|---|---|---|---|---|---|---|---|---|---|
| 1973–74 | Sherbrooke Castors | QMJHL | 40 | 8 | 37 | 45 | 96 | — | — | — | — | — |
| 1974–75 | Sherbrooke Castors | QMJHL | 70 | 26 | 64 | 90 | 142 | 13 | 2 | 18 | 20 | 19 |
| 1975–76 | Atlanta Flames | NHL | 12 | 1 | 0 | 1 | 4 | — | — | — | — | — |
| 1975–76 | Tulsa Oilers | CHL | 56 | 7 | 26 | 33 | 84 | 9 | 1 | 6 | 7 | 6 |
| 1976–77 | Atlanta Flames | NHL | 79 | 12 | 32 | 44 | 80 | 3 | 0 | 2 | 2 | 5 |
| 1977–78 | Atlanta Flames | NHL | 79 | 9 | 23 | 32 | 47 | 2 | 0 | 1 | 1 | 0 |
| 1978–79 | Atlanta Flames | NHL | 37 | 3 | 12 | 15 | 22 | — | — | — | — | — |
| 1978–79 | Los Angeles Kings | NHL | 36 | 2 | 9 | 11 | 23 | 1 | 0 | 0 | 0 | 0 |
| 1979–80 | Los Angeles Kings | NHL | 15 | 0 | 3 | 3 | 16 | — | — | — | — | — |
| 1979–80 | Toronto Maple Leafs | NHL | 26 | 0 | 10 | 10 | 11 | 1 | 0 | 0 | 0 | 0 |
| 1980–81 | Dallas Black Hawks | CHL | 20 | 7 | 11 | 18 | 16 | — | — | — | — | — |
| 1980–81 | Winnipeg Jets | NHL | 19 | 0 | 4 | 4 | 14 | — | — | — | — | — |
| 1980–81 | Tulsa Oilers | CHL | 5 | 2 | 3 | 5 | 0 | — | — | — | — | — |
| NHL totals | | | 303 | 27 | 93 | 120 | 217 | 7 | 0 | 3 | 3 | 5 |

| Preceded by Vic Mercredi | Atlanta Flames first-round draft pick 1975 | Succeeded by David Shand |
