= Jacques Richard =

Canadian ice hockey player (1952–2002)

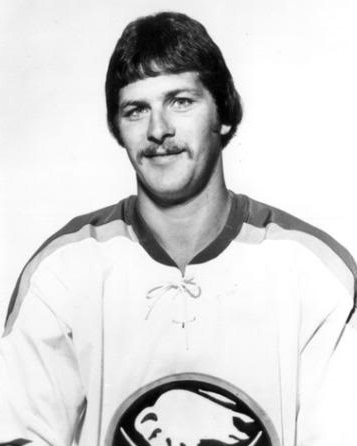
- Richard with the Buffalo Sabres in 1977
- Born: October 7, 1952 Quebec City, Quebec, Canada
- Died: October 8, 2002 (aged 50) Issoudun, Quebec, Canada
- Height: 5 ft 11 in (180 cm)
- Weight: 180 lb (82 kg; 12 st 12 lb)
- Position: Left wing
- Shot: Left
- Played for: Atlanta Flames; Buffalo Sabres; Hershey Bears; Rochester Americans; Quebec Nordiques; Fredericton Express
- NHL draft: 2nd overall, 1972; Atlanta Flames
- Playing career: 1972–1983

Joseph Alfred Gilles Jacques Richard (October 7, 1952 – October 8, 2002) was a Canadian professional ice hockey player who played in the National Hockey League (NHL) for the Atlanta Flames, Buffalo Sabres, and Quebec Nordiques. After an impressive junior career, Richard was considered a potential NHL superstar, but, except for a single season late in his career, he failed to live up to the promise. He led a troubled life both in hockey and after. Six years after retiring, in 1989, he was arrested for attempting to smuggle cocaine and then in 2002, Richard died in a car accident driving back from a party celebrating his 50th birthday.

== Career ==
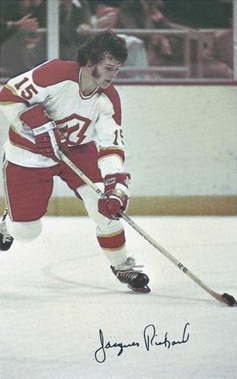
Jacques Richard of Atlanta Flames in 1972

Richard was drafted 2nd overall in the 1972 NHL Amateur Draft. Richard was slated to be the marquee player by the expansion Atlanta Flames. However, he had a largely mediocre pro career, with long stints in the minor leagues. Troubled at times by serious injuries—facial fractures in 1974–75 and a knee injury in 1979–80—he also indulged in alcohol, gambling and eventually cocaine.

=== Junior ===
As a youth, Richard played in the 1964 and 1965 Quebec International Pee-Wee Hockey Tournaments with the Quebec Beavers minor ice hockey team.

Richard had a spectacular junior career with the Quebec Remparts, scoring 186 goals and 213 assists for 399 points in only 169 games. Playing with Guy Chouinard and Andre Savard he was a significant component of a devastating trio. At the time Richard was considered by some hockey experts to have equal, if not more, pro potential than teammate Guy Lafleur. At one time, Rempart management was negotiating to trade Richard to the Rosemont Nationals, a team in the same Quebec Junior A league for 3 players and $6,000 in return. However, the deal became public and the reaction by fans, for whom Richard had become an idol, was so violent that the deal was annulled. Indicative of the level of success Richard had achieved, in 1969, he was named to the all-time QMJHL All-Star team by the Canadian Hockey League.

=== Professional ===
For the 1972–73 season the NHL added two teams, the Atlanta Flames and the New York Islanders, with a coin toss in June 1972 deciding which team would get the first choice in the draft. Concerned that the new World Hockey Association might sign the two top prospects, Billy Harris and Richard, the two expansion teams held their own coin toss in advance, won by New York, who elected to select Harris. This allowed the teams to begin immediate negotiations with the players.

Richard's rookie year in Atlanta was a disappointment. He rarely spoke to anyone that first year, perhaps a clue to problems adapting to the NHL. In February, after a game at Toronto in which the coach had sat him out, Richard left the team to return to his home in Quebec City and missed a couple practices without his coach's permission. Richard's uncle and agent said Richard "just reacted like a mixed-up kid. He got a little mad in Toronto, a little upset. Now he's realized he was wrong. He has decided he wants to play hockey again." Richard returned but finished the season scoring only 13 goals.

Teamed in his second season with Tom Lysiak, his prospects seemed brighter as he scored 27 goals. The next season, in October 1974, Richard suffered facial fractures, a fracture of the right orbital bone and nose, in a game against Detroit.

After three years with Atlanta, he was traded to the Buffalo Sabres, a team with more Francophone players. However, in his first season with Buffalo, Richard scored only 12 goals. Early in his second season, a teammate accused Richard of not giving a good effort during practices. In November, Richard was arrested for driving while intoxicated. Although team management said the two were not connected, Richard was then sent to Buffalo's minor league affiliate, the Hershey Bears. Buffalo Sabre general manager Punch Imlach in his book Heaven and Hell in the NHL recalled his travails dealing with Richard's drinking. On one occasion, Richard was forced to miss a game due to a sprained wrist which had been hurt in a bar fight. On another, he barely missed being shot in a Quebec bar; the bullet went through his pant leg. Imlach describes Richard as "a nice kid, good hockey player" but he was "wasting his talent". Richard spent the next five seasons alternating between the NHL and playing full seasons in the minors. In February 1980, Buffalo terminated Richard's contract, which left him free to sign with any team.

Immediately after being released by Buffalo, Richard signed with the Quebec Nordiques. Then in his eighth year as a pro and back in the city of his junior triumphs, the promise shown as a junior appeared to finally be realized. In the 1980–81 season, Richard tallied 52 goals and 51 assists for 103 points, to finish tenth in the league in points and seventh in goals. However, this was to be the only time he was to show this potential. The next season, his mediocre play returned.

Jacques Richard retired in 1983. His 347 career points are the fewest ever by a player who had a 100-point season, and his 162 career goals are the fewest by a player who had a 50-goal season.

== Retirement and death ==
In 1989, he was arrested for attempting to smuggle cocaine, with an estimated street value of $1.5 million, into Canada. He was sentenced to seven years in prison. Then, on October 8, 2002, driving home from his 50th birthday party, Richard was killed in a single-vehicle accident when he drove his car into a culvert.

== Awards and honours ==
QMJHL All-Star First Team: 1970–71, 1971–72
QMJHL Beliveau Trophy: 1971–72 (points leader)
Named to QMJHL all-time All-Star team by the Canadian Hockey League in 1999.

== Career statistics ==
			Regular season					Playoffs
Season	Team	League	GP	G	A	Pts	PIM	GP	G	A	Pts	PIM
1967–68	Quebec Jr. Aces	QJHL	50	18	18	36	?	—	—	—	—	—
1968–69	Quebec Jr. Aces	QJHL	50	23	40	63	78	—	—	—	—	—
1969–70	Quebec Remparts	QMJHL	52	62	64	126	170	15	11	14	25	30
1969–70	Quebec Remparts	MC	—	—	—	—	—	12	17	10	27	48
1970–71	Quebec Remparts	QMJHL	55	53	60	113	125	14	18	17	35	42
1970–71	Quebec Remparts	MC	—	—	—	—	—	7	6	7	13	8
1971–72	Quebec Remparts	QMJHL	61	71	89	160	100	15	11	26	37	23
1972–73	Atlanta Flames	NHL	74	13	18	31	32	—	—	—	—	—
1973–74	Atlanta Flames	NHL	78	27	16	43	45	4	0	0	0	2
1974–75	Atlanta Flames	NHL	63	17	12	29	31	—	—	—	—	—
1975–76	Buffalo Sabres	NHL	73	12	23	35	31	9	1	1	2	7
1976–77	Hershey Bears	AHL	44	20	25	45	42	6	3	0	3	2
1976–77	Buffalo Sabres	NHL	21	2	0	2	16	—	—	—	—	—
1977–78	Hershey Bears	AHL	54	25	23	48	29	—	—	—	—	—
1978–79	Buffalo Sabres	NHL	61	10	15	25	26	3	1	0	1	0
1979–80	Rochester Americans	AHL	37	13	23	36	37	—	—	—	—	—
1979–80	Quebec Nordiques	NHL	14	3	12	15	4	—	—	—	—	—
1980–81	Quebec Nordiques	NHL	78	52	51	103	39	5	2	4	6	14
1981–82	Quebec Nordiques	NHL	59	15	26	41	77	10	1	0	1	9
1982–83	Fredericton Express	AHL	19	16	15	31	16	—	—	—	—	—
1982–83	Quebec Nordiques	NHL	35	9	14	23	6	4	0	0	0	2
1983–84	Lausanne HC	CHE II
NHL totals			556	160	187	347	307	35	5	5	10	34

Preceded by None	Atlanta Flames first-round draft pick 1972	Succeeded by Tom Lysiak
