= Paul Reinhart =

Canadian ice hockey player (born 1960)

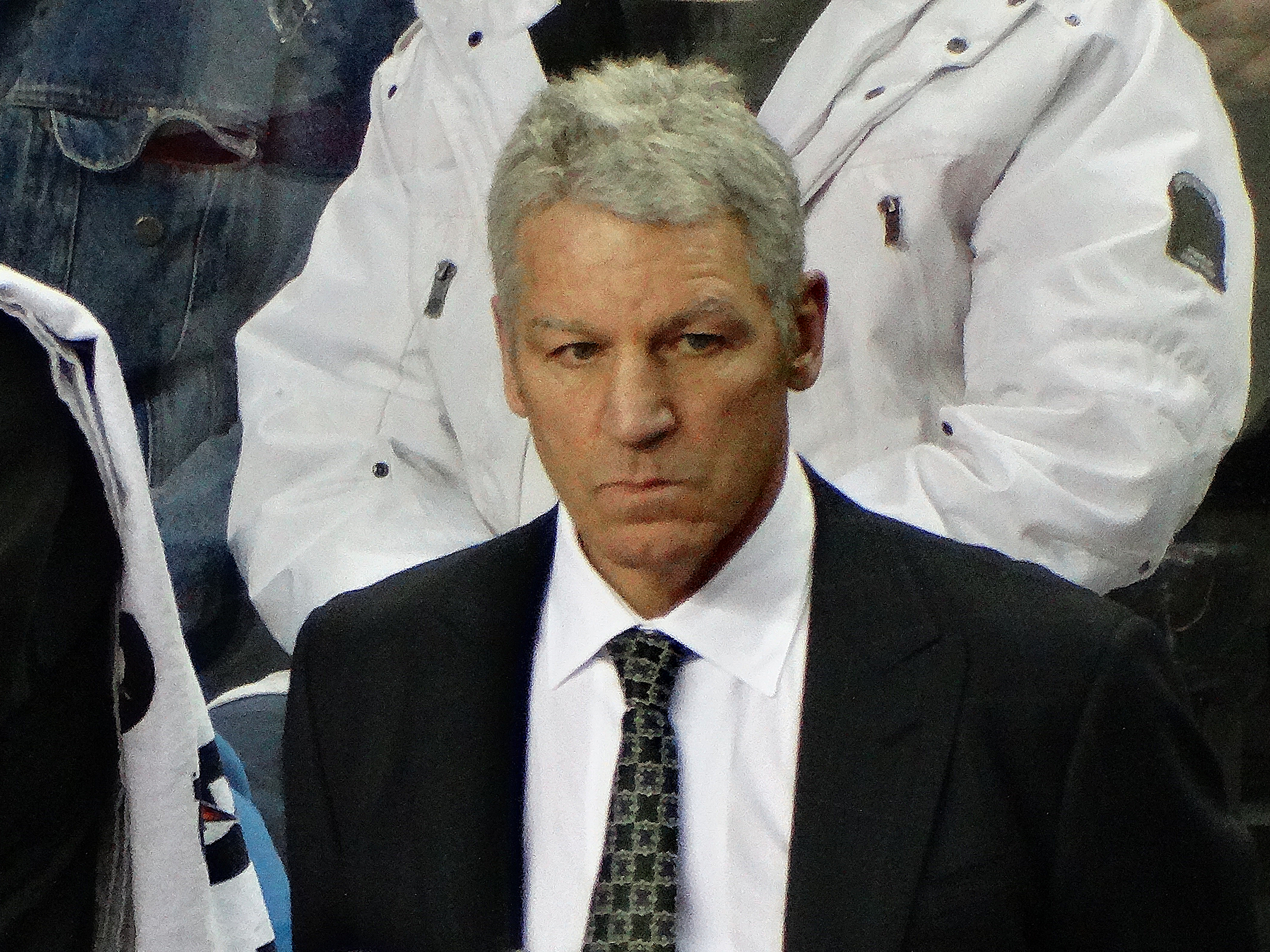
- Paul Reinhart in 2014
- Born: January 8, 1960 (age 66) Kitchener, Ontario, Canada
- Height: 5 ft 11 in (180 cm)
- Weight: 205 lb (93 kg; 14 st 9 lb)
- Position: Defence
- Shot: Left
- Played for: Atlanta Flames; Calgary Flames; Vancouver Canucks
- National team: Canada
- NHL draft: 12th overall, 1979; Atlanta Flames
- Playing career: 1979–1990
Medal record
Representing Canada
World Championships
Bronze medal – third place	1982 Finland
Bronze medal – third place	1983 Soviet Union

Paul Gerard Reinhart (born January 8, 1960) is a Canadian former professional ice hockey player who was a defenceman for the Atlanta Flames, Calgary Flames and Vancouver Canucks in the National Hockey League (NHL). He featured in the 1986 Stanley Cup Final with the Flames.

Reinhart was a first round selection by Atlanta, 12th overall, at the 1979 NHL entry draft, and immediately broke into the NHL, becoming one of the most underrated defenseman of the 1980s. He relocated with the franchise to Calgary in 1980, playing a total of nine seasons with the Flames franchise until he was traded to Vancouver in 1988. He was a two-time all-star and played with Team Canada on three occasions, winning bronze medals at the World Championships in 1982 and 1983. Chronic back problems plagued him throughout his career and forced his retirement in 1990.

Settling in Vancouver following his playing career, Reinhart became a stock market financier and investor. He was briefly involved with the Vancouver Ravens of the National Lacrosse League in the early 2000s.

== Playing career ==
=== Junior ===
Reinhart began his junior career with his hometown Kitchener Rangers of the Ontario Major Junior Hockey League (OMJHL) in 1975–76, scoring 39 points in 53 games. He had been a protected player of the Rangers — signed directly by the team without his having to go through the league's draft—but when the OMJHL eliminated the rules allowing teams to protect midget-aged players following the season, he was made eligible for the 1976 draft. The Peterborough Petes claimed him with the third overall selection in the June 1976 draft, despite the fact that Reinhart and his family made it known he would refuse to play for any team other than Kitchener. His agent, Alan Eagleson, threatened to take the team and league to court in a bid to force them to respect Reinhart's wishes. The dispute was not settled until November when the Petes traded Reinhart to Kitchener as part of a three-team trade that involved the Oshawa Generals. The league had to rescind a rule prohibiting teams from trading first round draft picks to allow the deal to pass and to avoid the threat of litigation by Eagleson.

On the ice, Reinhart scored a total of 104 points as a defenceman with the Rangers between 1975 and 1978 before breaking out offensively in the 1978–79 season after moving centre for the majority of the campaign. He scored 51 goals and 78 assists for 129 points in 66 games to finish fifth overall in OMJHL scoring. The team's captain in his final year, Reinhart won numerous team honours during his four years in Kitchener including three awards for having the "best defensive ability" on the team.

=== Professional ===
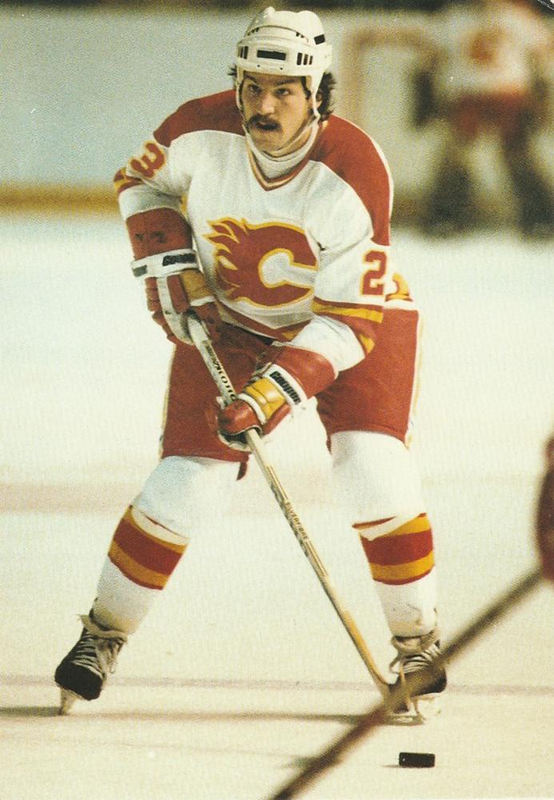
1982 postcard of Reinhart for Calgary Flames

The Atlanta Flames selected Reinhart with their first round selection, 12th overall, at the 1979 NHL entry draft. Though he had been set to join Team Canada for the 1980 Winter Olympics, the Flames convinced Reinhart to sign with the team and begin his professional career instead. Joining the Flames for the 1979–80 NHL season, the 19-year-old Reinhart became the youngest player to appear for the team at that point in franchise history. He appeared in 79 games for Atlanta, finishing as the team's highest scoring defenceman. His total of 47 points was second to Ray Bourque for the overall lead amongst rookie defencemen.

Transferring to Calgary along with the franchise in 1980–81, Reinhart improved to 67 points during the regular season and tied for the league lead in playoff assists with 14. He was named to the Canadian entry for the 1981 Canada Cup tournament, but suffered an ankle injury and appeared in only two games. He remained an offensive catalyst for the team, scoring 61 points in 1981–82 and set a franchise record for points by a defenceman with 75 in 1982–83. His career total of 250 points also set a Flames franchise record for a defenceman. He returned to Team Canada following both seasons to play in the World Championships. He won bronze medals with the team in both 1982 and 1983, and was named Team Canada's top defenceman in 1983.

Reinhart suffered a serious injury midway through the 1983–84 season. Skating behind his net during a game against the Winnipeg Jets, his skate caught a rut and he twisted his back as he fell. He had to be carried off the ice on a stretcher, and was initially diagnosed with back spasms. He was later diagnosed as having suffered a herniated disc. He missed 51 games as a result of the injury, but scored a goal and an assist on his return, a 4–1 victory over the Hartford Whalers. Despite missing the majority of the season, Reinhart was the Flames' offensive leader in the 1984 playoffs, leading the team and finishing first amongst all players who did not reach the finals with 17 points.

Though he turned down an offer to play with Team Canada at the 1984 Canada Cup due to his back, Reinhart remained healthy for the 1984–85 season, scoring a career high 23 goals to go with 67 points in 75 games. He also appeared in his first NHL All-Star Game, playing in front of his home fans at the 1985 game in Calgary. Recurring back spasms again forced him to miss much of the 1985–86 season; he was limited to 32 games. Reinhart remained healthy in 1986–87, finishing fourth in the league amongst defencemen with 69 points. He scored his 100th career goal, playing at centre, while recording a hat trick in a 6–5 win over the Edmonton Oilers on November 24, 1986. His chronic back issues worsened in 1987–88, as he played only 14 games for the Flames, scoring four points.

Between his back issues and the team's desire to promote some of its younger defencemen to more prominent roles within the team, the Flames chose to trade Reinhart on September 6, 1988, along with Steve Bozek, to the Vancouver Canucks in exchange for a third round selection at the 1989 NHL entry draft. Reinhart played the majority of two seasons in Vancouver, though he missed 29 games between 1988 and 1990. He was named an All-Star for the second time in his career in 1989, and was an offensive leader for the Canucks. He scored 57 points in both 1988–89 and 1989–90, and was named the recipient of the Babe Pratt Trophy as the Canucks' top defenceman in both seasons. However, chronic back pain forced him out of the game following that season. Reinhart announced his retirement at the age of 30.

== Playing style ==
Though his position for the majority of his career was in defence, his offensive ability and speed meant that his teams occasionally played him at forward. At times, the Flames had him playing 30 minutes per game as he was often used at centre while also taking regular shifts at defence. He claimed in 1982 to prefer playing forward, but realized that the organization needed him on defence to act as a quarterback for the team's offence. Bob Johnson, his coach for the majority of his time in Calgary, said that Reinhart was the type of player that could be a "cornerstone" for a franchise.

== Personal life ==
Reinhart and his wife Theresa have three children, all of whom play hockey. Their eldest son, Max, made his NHL debut with the Flames in 2013. His middle son, Griffin was drafted 4th overall in the 2012 NHL entry draft by the New York Islanders. His youngest son, Sam, was selected 2nd overall in the 2014 NHL entry draft by the Buffalo Sabres. In the 2021 offseason Sam was traded to the Florida Panthers. Paul and his wife spent their summers in Calgary during his playing days, where he often played with the team's summer charity softball team, but settled in West Vancouver following the end of his NHL career.

Flames' co-owner Doc Seaman introduced Reinhart to investing and finance while he was playing with the team. He also owned a restaurant in Calgary. He now makes his living investing in start-up companies. Reinhart's investments have focused on resource exploration and medical companies and in 2011 joined the management of Vancouver-based Bearing Resources Ltd. He was involved with the Vancouver Ravens franchise in the National Lacrosse League for a time, but walked away from the franchise in 2003 after claiming losses in excess of $1 million. In 2014, Reinhart partnered with another former Vancouver Canuck, Bret Hedican, investing over $1 million in a sports team management start-up, RosterBot, based in Vancouver.

== Career statistics ==
=== Regular season and playoffs ===
			Regular season					Playoffs
Season	Team	League	GP	G	A	Pts	PIM	GP	G	A	Pts	PIM
1975–76	Kitchener Rangers	OMJHL	53	6	33	39	42	8	1	2	3	4
1976–77	Kitchener Rangers	OMJHL	51	4	14	18	16	3	0	2	2	4
1977–78	Kitchener Rangers	OMJHL	47	17	28	45	15	9	4	6	10	29
1978–79	Kitchener Rangers	OMJHL	66	51	78	129	57	10	3	10	13	16
1979–80	Atlanta Flames	NHL	79	9	38	47	31	—	—	—	—	—
1980–81	Calgary Flames	NHL	74	18	49	67	52	16	1	14	15	16
1981–82	Calgary Flames	NHL	62	13	48	61	17	3	0	1	1	2
1982–83	Calgary Flames	NHL	78	17	58	75	28	8	6	3	9	2
1983–84	Calgary Flames	NHL	27	6	15	21	10	11	6	11	17	2
1984–85	Calgary Flames	NHL	75	23	46	69	18	4	1	1	2	0
1985–86	Calgary Flames	NHL	32	8	25	33	15	21	5	13	18	4
1986–87	Calgary Flames	NHL	76	15	54	69	22	4	0	1	1	6
1987–88	Calgary Flames	NHL	14	0	4	4	10	8	2	7	9	6
1988–89	Vancouver Canucks	NHL	64	7	50	57	44	7	2	3	5	4
1989–90	Vancouver Canucks	NHL	67	17	40	57	30	—	—	—	—	—
NHL totals			648	133	427	560	277	82	23	54	77	42

=== International ===
Year	Team	Event	Result	GP	G	A	Pts	PIM
1981	Canada	CC	2nd place, silver medalist(s)	2	0	0	0	2
1982	Canada	WC	3rd place, bronze medalist(s)	7	1	5	6	4
1983	Canada	WC	3rd place, bronze medalist(s)	6	2	4	6	2
Senior totals				15	3	9	12	8

== See also ==
- List of family relations in the NHL

Preceded by Brad Marsh	Atlanta Flames' first-round draft pick 1979	Succeeded by Denis Cyr
