= Jean Pronovost =

Canadian ice hockey player

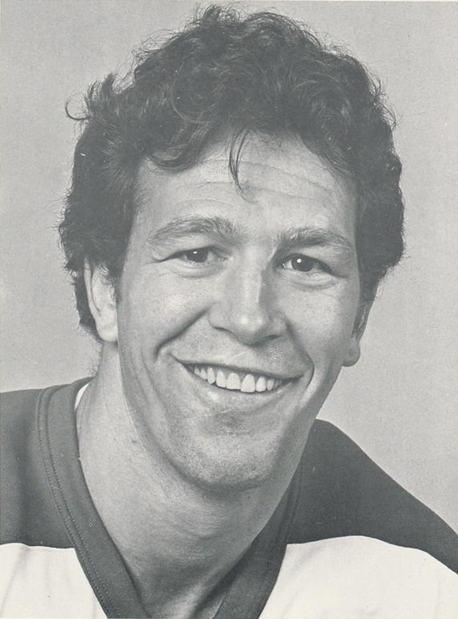
- Born: December 18, 1945 (age 80) Shawinigan Falls, Quebec, Canada
- Height: 5 ft 11 in (180 cm)
- Weight: 165 lb (75 kg; 11 st 11 lb)
- Position: Right Wing
- Shot: Right
- Played for: Pittsburgh Penguins; Atlanta Flames; Washington Capitals
- National team: Canada
- Playing career: 1966–1982
Medal record
Representing Canada
World Championships
| Bronze medal – third place | 1978 Czechoslovakia |

Jean Joseph Denis Pronovost (born December 18, 1945) is a Canadian retired professional ice hockey right winger who played in the National Hockey League (NHL) for the Pittsburgh Penguins, Atlanta Flames and Washington Capitals.

== Biography ==
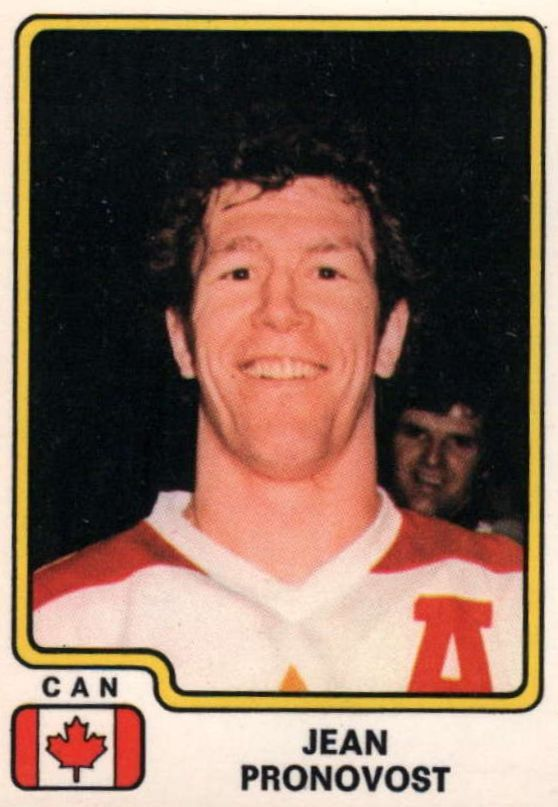
Pronovost in 1979

Pronovost played his junior hockey for the Niagara Falls Flyers. In his rookie year, he won the scoring title for the team, as well as Rookie of the Year.

He was acquired by the Pittsburgh Penguins along with John Arbour from the Boston Bruins on May 21, 1968 for the Penguins 1969 first round draft pick (4th overall Frank Spring) and cash.

Pronovost was a consistent scorer who scored 40 goals four times. He was also the first member of the Pittsburgh Penguins to score 100 points in a season and 50 goals in a season.

He was traded to Atlanta by Pittsburgh for Gregg Sheppard on September 6, 1978 and was sold to Washington by Calgary on July 1, 1980.

Pronovost coached Shawinigan Cataractes of the QMJHL 1994 to 1996; the Quebec Rafales of the IHL 1996-97 and Rouyn-Noranda Huskies (QMJHL) 2000-01.

== Awards ==
- 1964-65 won the Gamma Sigma Award for Rookie of the Year for The Niagara Falls Flyers Major Junior "A" Team.
- Member of the Trib Total Media Penguins All-Time Team and the Pittsburgh Penguins Hall of Fame
- Pictured up in the Ring of Honor that formerly circled in the Pittsburgh Civic Arena

== Personal life ==
He is also a born-again Christian and worked at Emmanuel Christian School in Dollard des Ormeaux in the West Island of Montreal, Quebec. He is currently retired and living in Calgary with his wife where they attend Rocky Mountain Calvary Chapel. Two of Jean's older brothers also played in the NHL: Marcel Pronovost and Claude Pronovost.

== Career statistics ==
=== Regular season and playoffs ===
| | | | Regular season | | | | | Playoffs |
| Season | Team | League | GP | G | A | Pts | PIM | GP | G | A | Pts | PIM |
|---|---|---|---|---|---|---|---|---|---|---|---|---|
| 1963–64 | Victoriaville Bruins | QJHL | 9 | 8 | 4 | 12 | 4 | — | — | — | — | — |
| 1963–64 | Victoriaville Bruins | M-Cup | — | — | — | — | — | 3 | 0 | 0 | 0 | 0 |
| 1964–65 | Niagara Falls Flyers | OHA-Jr. | 54 | 30 | 40 | 70 | 40 | 11 | 4 | 8 | 12 | 8 |
| 1964–65 | Niagara Falls Flyers | M-Cup | — | — | — | — | — | 13 | 7 | 12 | 19 | 2 |
| 1965–66 | Niagara Falls Flyers | OHA-Jr. | 48 | 18 | 34 | 52 | 47 | — | — | — | — | — |
| 1966–67 | Oklahoma City Blazers | CPHL | 68 | 21 | 24 | 45 | 81 | 11 | 5 | 2 | 7 | 12 |
| 1967–68 | Oklahoma City Blazers | CPHL | 49 | 25 | 25 | 50 | 41 | 7 | 3 | 4 | 7 | 6 |
| 1968–69 | Pittsburgh Penguins | NHL | 76 | 16 | 25 | 41 | 41 | — | — | — | — | — |
| 1969–70 | Pittsburgh Penguins | NHL | 72 | 20 | 21 | 41 | 45 | 10 | 3 | 4 | 7 | 2 |
| 1970–71 | Pittsburgh Penguins | NHL | 78 | 21 | 24 | 45 | 35 | — | — | — | — | — |
| 1971–72 | Pittsburgh Penguins | NHL | 68 | 30 | 23 | 53 | 12 | 4 | 1 | 1 | 2 | 0 |
| 1972–73 | Pittsburgh Penguins | NHL | 66 | 21 | 22 | 43 | 16 | — | — | — | — | — |
| 1973–74 | Pittsburgh Penguins | NHL | 77 | 40 | 32 | 72 | 22 | — | — | — | — | — |
| 1974–75 | Pittsburgh Penguins | NHL | 78 | 43 | 32 | 75 | 37 | 9 | 3 | 3 | 6 | 6 |
| 1975–76 | Pittsburgh Penguins | NHL | 80 | 52 | 52 | 104 | 24 | 3 | 0 | 0 | 0 | 2 |
| 1976–77 | Pittsburgh Penguins | NHL | 79 | 33 | 31 | 64 | 24 | 3 | 2 | 1 | 3 | 2 |
| 1977–78 | Pittsburgh Penguins | NHL | 79 | 40 | 25 | 65 | 50 | — | — | — | — | — |
| 1978–79 | Atlanta Flames | NHL | 75 | 28 | 39 | 67 | 30 | 2 | 2 | 0 | 2 | 0 |
| 1979–80 | Atlanta Flames | NHL | 80 | 24 | 19 | 43 | 12 | 4 | 0 | 0 | 0 | 2 |
| 1980–81 | Washington Capitals | NHL | 80 | 22 | 36 | 58 | 61 | — | — | — | — | — |
| 1981–82 | Hershey Bears | AHL | 64 | 35 | 31 | 66 | 18 | 5 | 1 | 1 | 2 | 0 |
| 1981–82 | Washington Capitals | NHL | 10 | 1 | 2 | 3 | 4 | — | — | — | — | — |
| NHL totals | | | 998 | 391 | 383 | 774 | 413 | 35 | 11 | 9 | 20 | 14 |

=== International ===
| Year | Team | Event | GP | G | A | Pts | PIM |
|---|---|---|---|---|---|---|---|
| 1977 | Canada | WC | 7 | 2 | 2 | 4 | 0 |
| 1978 | Canada | WC | 10 | 2 | 3 | 5 | 0 |
| Senior totals | | | 17 | 4 | 5 | 9 | 0 |

| Preceded by Ron Schock | Pittsburgh Penguins captain 1977–78 | Succeeded by Orest Kindrachuk |
| Preceded by Tom Lysiak | Atlanta Flames captain 1979–80 | Succeeded by Calgary Flames captains Brad Marsh |
