= Al McDonough =

Canadian ice hockey player

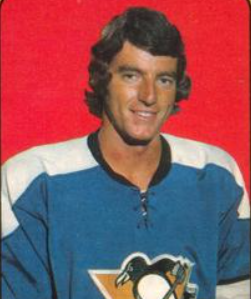
- McDonough in 1972 card
- Born: June 6, 1950 (age 76) Hamilton, Ontario, Canada
- Height: 6 ft 1 in (185 cm)
- Weight: 165 lb (75 kg; 11 st 11 lb)
- Position: Right wing
- Shot: Right
- Played for: Los Angeles Kings; Pittsburgh Penguins; Atlanta Flames; Cleveland Crusaders; Minnesota Fighting Saints; Detroit Red Wings
- NHL draft: 24th overall, 1970; Los Angeles Kings
- Playing career: 1970–1978

James Allison McDonough (born June 6, 1950) is a Canadian former professional ice hockey player who played 237 games in the National Hockey League (NHL) and 200 games in the World Hockey Association.

McDonough was born in Hamilton, Ontario.

== Career statistics ==
			Regular season					Playoffs
Season	Team	League	GP	G	A	Pts	PIM	GP	G	A	Pts	PIM
1967–68	St. Catharines Black Hawks	OHA-Jr.	49	12	8	20	13	4	1	0	1	0
1968–69	St. Catharines Black Hawks	OHA-Jr.	54	26	20	46	34	17	5	7	12	12
1969–70	St. Catharines Black Hawks	OHA-Jr.	53	47	56	103	57	10	4	8	12	15
1970–71	Los Angeles Kings	NHL	6	2	1	3	0	—	—	—	—	—
1970–71	Springfield Kings	AHL	65	33	16	49	27	12	1	2	3	9
1971–72	Los Angeles Kings	NHL	31	3	2	5	8	—	—	—	—	—
1971–72	Pittsburgh Penguins	NHL	37	7	11	18	8	4	0	1	1	0
1972–73	Pittsburgh Penguins	NHL	78	35	41	76	26	—	—	—	—	—
1973–74	Pittsburgh Penguins	NHL	37	14	22	36	12	—	—	—	—	—
1973–74	Atlanta Flames	NHL	35	10	9	19	15	4	0	0	0	2
1974–75	Cleveland Crusaders	WHA	78	34	30	64	27	5	2	1	3	2
1975–76	Cleveland Crusaders	WHA	80	23	22	45	19	3	1	0	1	2
1976–77	Minnesota Fighting Saints	WHA	42	9	21	30	6	—	—	—	—	—
1977–78	Detroit Red Wings	NHL	13	2	2	4	4	—	—	—	—	—
1977–78	Kansas City Red Wings	CHL	52	18	24	42	14	—	—	—	—	—
NHL totals			237	73	88	161	73	8	0	1	1	2
WHA totals			200	66	73	139	52	8	3	1	4	2
