= Brad Marsh =

Canadian ice hockey player (born 1958)

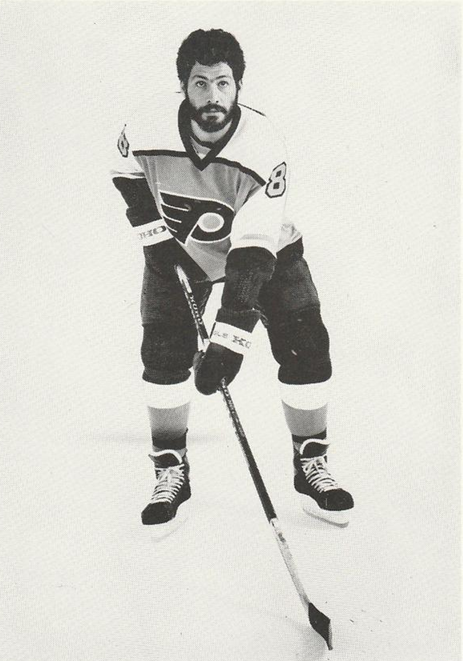
- Born: March 31, 1958 (age 68) London, Ontario, Canada
- Height: 6 ft 3 in (191 cm)
- Weight: 220 lb (100 kg; 15 st 10 lb)
- Position: Defence
- Shot: Left
- Played for: Atlanta Flames; Calgary Flames; Philadelphia Flyers; Toronto Maple Leafs; Detroit Red Wings; Ottawa Senators
- National team: Canada
- NHL draft: 11th overall, 1978; Atlanta Flames
- Playing career: 1978–1993

Charles Bradley Marsh (born March 31, 1958) is a Canadian former professional ice hockey player who played as a defenceman in the National Hockey League (NHL). Marsh played for the Atlanta Flames, Calgary Flames, Philadelphia Flyers, Toronto Maple Leafs, Detroit Red Wings and Ottawa Senators over a 15-year NHL career. He featured in two Stanley Cup Finals with the Flyers (1985, 1987).

He played for the Prince of Wales Conference in the 1993 NHL All-Star Game, scoring one goal.

== Playing career ==
=== London Knights (1973–1978) ===
Marsh played junior hockey with the London Knights of the OHA during the 1973–74, appearing in 13 games, while not earning any points and two penalty minutes.

Marsh returned to the Knights during the 1974–75 season, playing in all 70 games, scoring four goals and 21 points, while leading the club with 160 penalty minutes. London failed to qualify for the post-season.

In 1975–76, Marsh scored three goals and 29 points in 61 games, while leading the Knights in penalty minutes once again, as he registered 181 penalty minutes. In the post-season, Marsh had a goal and three points in five games, as London lost to the Toronto Marlboros in the OMJHL quarter-finals.

Marsh continued to improve during the 1976–77, as he scored seven goals and 40 points in 62 games with the Knights. He finished the season with 121 penalty minutes, second on the club. In the playoffs, Marsh scored three goals and eight points in 20 games, helping London to the J. Ross Robertson Cup finals, where they lost to the Ottawa 67's.

In his final season with the Knights in 1977–78, Marsh scored eight goals and 63 points in 62 games, while leading the club with 192 penalty minutes, helping London finish in first place in the Emms Division. In the post-season, Marsh scored two goals and 12 points in 11 games, as the team lost in the OMJHL semi-finals. Marsh won the Max Kaminsky Trophy which is awarded to the best defenseman in the OMJHL.

The Knights would honour Marsh by retiring his sweater number following his playing career.

=== Atlanta/Calgary Flames (1978–1981) ===
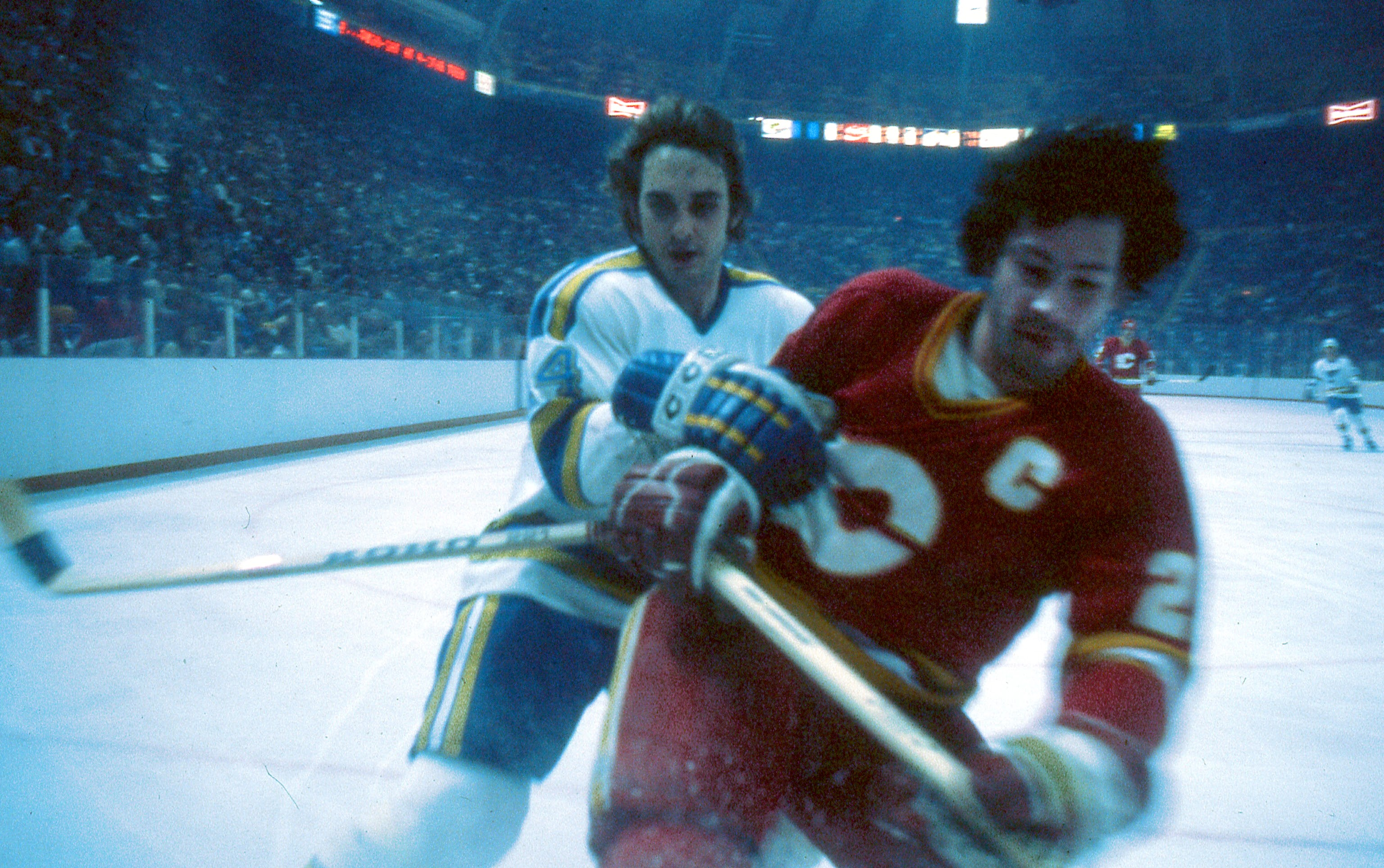
Blair Chapman and Marsh (right) during an NHL game between the Calgary Flames and the St. Louis Blues on November 29, 1980.

The Atlanta Flames drafted Marsh in the first round, 11th overall, at the 1978 NHL entry draft held in Montreal, Quebec.

Marsh made his NHL debut with the Flames against the Chicago Black Hawks on October 11, 1978, where he was held with no points in a 4–4 tie. In his second career game, on October 13 against the Washington Capitals, Marsh earned his first career point, an assist on a goal by Ken Houston in a 3–3 tie. Marsh finished the 1978–79 season by playing in all 80 games, however, he did not score a goal and earned 19 assists. His 101 penalty minutes was the fourth highest on the Flames. On April 10, Marsh appeared in his first playoff game, earning no points in a 4–1 loss to the Toronto Maple Leafs. Overall, he played in two post-season games, being held pointless, as the Flames lost to Toronto.

During the third game of the 1979–80 season, Marsh scored his first career NHL goal, against Phil Myre of the Philadelphia Flyers in a 9-2 Flames victory. Marsh finished the season with two goals and 11 points while playing in all 80 games for the second consecutive season. Marsh's 119 penalty minutes was the second highest on the club. In the post-season, Marsh earned his first career playoff point, an assist on a goal by Eric Vail in the third game of the Flames first round series against the New York Rangers. Overall, Marsh had one assist in four playoff games.

Marsh remained with the club during the summer of 1980, as the franchise transferred from Atlanta to Calgary, Alberta and became the Calgary Flames. Marsh was named captain of the club for the 1980–81 season after former captain Jean Pronovost was traded to the Washington Capitals. Marsh again played in all 80 games with the team, scoring a goal and 13 points while accumulating 87 penalty minutes, helping the club to the post-season. In 16 playoff games, Marsh earned five assists, as Calgary lost to the Minnesota North Stars in the NHL semi-finals.

Marsh began the 1981–82 season with the Flames. He played in 17 games with Calgary, earning an assist, while struggling with a -16 rating. On November 11, 1981, the Flames traded Marsh to the Philadelphia Flyers for Mel Bridgman.

=== Philadelphia Flyers (1981–1988) ===
Marsh joined the Philadelphia Flyers following a mid-season trade with the Calgary Flames during the 1981–82 season. He finished the season by appearing in 66 games with Philadelphia, scoring two goals and earning a career high 24 points, while earning 106 penalty minutes. In the post-season, Marsh was held pointless in four games.

In 1982–83, Marsh appeared in 68 games, scoring two goals and 13 points, while cutting down on his penalty minutes, earning only 52. In the post-season, Marsh earned an assist in two games.

During the 1983–84 season, Marsh set a career high in goals, as he scored three, while adding 14 assists for 17 points in 77 games. On April 5, during the Flyers second playoff game against the Washington Capitals, Marsh scored his first career playoff goal, against Al Jensen in a 6–2 loss. Marsh finished the post-season with a goal and two points in four games.

In the 1984–85 season, Marsh set a career high with a +42 rating, as well as scoring two goals and 20 points in 77 games. In the post-season, Marsh earned six assists in 19 games, while accumulating 65 penalty minutes, as the Flyers lost to the Edmonton Oilers in the 1985 Stanley Cup Finals. Following the season, Marsh finished in seventh place in Norris Trophy voting.

Marsh became an alternate captain in 1985–86. He played in 79 games, scoring no goals and 13 assists, while earning 123 penalty minutes. In five playoff games, Marsh had no points.

In 1986–87, Marsh scored two goals and 11 points in 77 games, while setting a career high 124 penalty minutes. In the post-season, Marsh played in 26 games, scoring three goals and seven points, as the Flyers lost to the Edmonton Oilers in seven games in the 1987 Stanley Cup Finals.

During the 1987–88 season, Marsh tied his career high in goals with three, as he earned 12 points in 70 games. In seven playoff games, Marsh scored a goal.

On October 3, 1988, the Toronto Maple Leafs claimed Marsh in the waiver draft.

=== Toronto Maple Leafs (1988–1991) ===
Marsh played his first game with the Toronto Maple Leafs on October 6, 1988, earning no points in a 2–1 loss to the Boston Bruins. Marsh earned his first point with the Leafs on October 9, an assist in an 8–4 victory over the Chicago Blackhawks. On April 1, 1989, Marsh scored his first goal with Toronto against Greg Millen of the St. Louis Blues in a 4–3 loss. Overall, Marsh scored a goal and 16 points in 80 games during his first season in Toronto, however, for the first time in his NHL career, he failed to qualify for the playoffs.

Marsh became an alternate captain for the Leafs for the 1989–90 season. In 79 games, Marsh scored a goal and 14 points while earning 95 penalty minutes, helping Toronto reach the post-season. In five playoff games, Marsh scored a goal.

He began the 1990–91 season with the Leafs. Marsh appeared in 22 games with Toronto, earning no points. On February 4, 1991, the Leafs traded Marsh to the Detroit Red Wings for the Red Wings eighth round draft pick in the 1991 NHL entry draft.

=== Detroit Red Wings (1991–1992) ===
Marsh finished the 1990–91 with the Detroit Red Wings following his trade from the Toronto Maple Leafs. Marsh played his first game with the Red Wings on February 8, 1991, earning an assist in an 8–4 victory over the New York Islanders. Nine days later, on February 17, Marsh recorded his first goal with Detroit, beating Ed Belfour of the Chicago Blackhawks in a 3–3 tie. In 20 games with the Red Wings, Marsh had a goal and four points. He suited up for Detroit for one playoff game, earning no points.

Marsh returned to the Red Wings for the 1991–92 season, appearing in 55 games. He tied his career high in goals with three, and added four assists for seven points. In three playoff games, Marsh had no points.

On June 10, 1992, Marsh was traded back to the Toronto Maple Leafs for cash; however, on July 20, 1992, the Maple Leafs traded Marsh to the Ottawa Senators for future considerations.

=== Ottawa Senators (1992–1993) ===
Marsh was named an alternate captain for the Ottawa Senators in their inaugural season. Marsh played his first game with the Senators on October 10, 1992, as he was held with no points in a 9–2 loss to the Quebec Nordiques. On October 27, Marsh earned his first point for Ottawa, an assist on a goal by Laurie Boschman, in a 7–2 loss to the Pittsburgh Penguins. Marsh represented the Senators at the 44th National Hockey League All-Star Game held at the Montreal Forum in Montreal, Quebec, where he scored a goal as the Wales Conference defeated the Campbell Conference 16–6. This would be the only goal that Marsh would score during the season.

Marsh finished the 1992–93 season with three assists in 57 games. Following the season, Marsh announced his retirement from the NHL. Overall, he played in 1086 games, scoring 23 goals and 175 assists for 198 points, and earning 1241 penalty minutes. In 97 career playoff games, Marsh scored six goals and 24 points while accumulating 124 penalty minutes. His 23 goals is the NHL record for fewest goals scored by a player who played at least 1000 games. Marsh was also one of the last NHL players to not wear a helmet during league play.

== Post-retirement ==
After his retirement, he moved into the Senators' front office as Director of Team and Business Development and remained there for several years. He also coached various levels of minor hockey over the years.

In the late 1990s, Marsh opened a sports bar in the Senators' arena known as Marshy's.

In 2007, Marsh was inducted into the London (Ontario) Sports Hall of Fame.

Marsh was announced as the head coach of the Canadian Women's Hockey League's Ottawa franchise on August 31, 2009. He was later hired as an assistant coach for Queen's University's hockey team, the Gaels, on August 26, 2011.

In late 2013, Marsh joined HockeyBuzz.com as one of the website's featured bloggers, writing stories that mainly touch on his playing days and providing insight to league issues and happenings.

In October 2018, Marsh helped to establish the Philadelphia Flyers Warriors, a disabled veteran hockey team, that is the first and only all veteran athletic team to be recognized by the City of Philadelphia to represent the City of Philadelphia.

== Career statistics ==
=== Regular season and playoffs ===
			Regular season					Playoffs
Season	Team	League	GP	G	A	Pts	PIM	GP	G	A	Pts	PIM
1973–74	London Knights	OHA-Jr.	13	0	0	0	2	—	—	—	—	—
1974–75	London Knights	OMJHL	70	4	17	21	160	—	—	—	—	—
1975–76	London Knights	OMJHL	61	3	26	29	184	5	1	2	3	18
1976–77	London Knights	OMJHL	63	7	33	40	121	20	3	5	8	47
1977–78	London Knights	OMJHL	62	8	55	63	192	11	2	10	12	21
1978–79	Atlanta Flames	NHL	80	0	19	19	101	2	0	0	0	17
1979–80	Atlanta Flames	NHL	80	2	9	11	119	4	0	1	1	2
1980–81	Calgary Flames	NHL	80	1	12	13	87	16	0	5	5	8
1981–82	Calgary Flames	NHL	17	0	1	1	10	—	—	—	—	—
1981–82	Philadelphia Flyers	NHL	66	2	22	24	106	4	0	0	0	2
1982–83	Philadelphia Flyers	NHL	68	2	11	13	52	2	0	1	1	0
1983–84	Philadelphia Flyers	NHL	77	3	14	17	83	3	1	1	2	2
1984–85	Philadelphia Flyers	NHL	77	2	18	20	91	19	0	6	6	65
1985–86	Philadelphia Flyers	NHL	79	0	13	13	123	5	0	0	0	2
1986–87	Philadelphia Flyers	NHL	77	2	9	11	124	26	3	4	7	16
1987–88	Philadelphia Flyers	NHL	70	3	9	12	57	7	1	0	1	8
1988–89	Toronto Maple Leafs	NHL	80	1	15	16	79	—	—	—	—	—
1989–90	Toronto Maple Leafs	NHL	79	1	13	14	95	5	1	0	1	2
1990–91	Toronto Maple Leafs	NHL	22	0	0	0	15	—	—	—	—	—
1990–91	Detroit Red Wings	NHL	20	1	3	4	16	1	0	0	0	0
1991–92	Detroit Red Wings	NHL	55	3	4	7	53	3	0	0	0	0
1992–93	Ottawa Senators	NHL	59	0	3	3	30	—	—	—	—	—
NHL totals			1,086	23	175	198	1,241	97	6	18	24	124

=== International ===
Year	Team	Event	GP	G	A	Pts	PIM
1977	Canada	WJC	7	1	3	4	14
1978	Canada	WJC	6	0	4	4	2
1979	Canada	WC	6	1	0	1	4
Junior totals			13	1	7	8	16
Senior totals			6	1	0	1	4

=== Coaching statistics ===
Note: GP = Games played, W = Wins, L = Losses, OTL = Overtime Losses, SOL = Shootout Losses, GF = Goals for, GA = Goals against, Pts = Points.

Season	Team	GP	W	L	OTL	SOL	Pts	GF	GA
2009-10	Ottawa Senators (CWHL)	30	5	23	1	1	12	61	125

== See also ==
- List of NHL players with 1,000 games played

Preceded by Harold Phillipoff	Atlanta Flames' first-round draft pick 1978	Succeeded by Paul Reinhart
Preceded by Atlanta Flames captains Jean Pronovost	Calgary Flames captain 1980–81	Succeeded by Phil Russell
