= Randy Manery =

Canadian ice hockey player

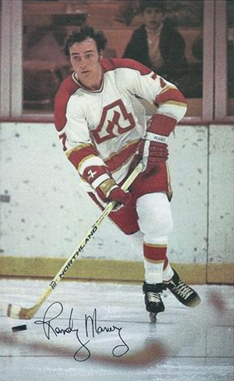
- Born: January 10, 1949 (age 77) Leamington, Ontario, Canada
- Height: 6 ft 0 in (183 cm)
- Weight: 181 lb (82 kg; 12 st 13 lb)
- Position: Defence
- Shot: Right
- Played for: Los Angeles Kings; Atlanta Flames; Detroit Red Wings
- Playing career: 1969–1980

Randy Neal Manery (born January 10, 1949) is a Canadian former professional ice hockey defenceman.

Manery started his National Hockey League career with the Detroit Red Wings in 1970. He also played for the Atlanta Flames and Los Angeles Kings. He retired from the NHL after the 1980 season. Manery was the first player to represent the Atlanta Flames in an NHL All-Star Game.

Born in Leamington, Ontario, Manery currently resides in Waxhaw, North Carolina with his wife, Linda. Manery is the Director of International Development for CURE International and serves as the head of CURE International Canada. Randy is the brother of Kris Manery.

== Career statistics ==
=== Regular season and playoffs ===
			Regular season					Playoffs
Season	Team	League	GP	G	A	Pts	PIM	GP	G	A	Pts	PIM
1966–67	Hamilton Red Wings	OHA	47	2	3	5	28	17	2	2	4	18
1967–68	Hamilton Red Wings	OHA	53	3	20	23	65	11	0	7	7	28
1968–69	Hamilton Red Wings	OHA	54	4	25	29	100	5	1	1	2	6
1969–70	Fort Worth Wings	CHL	67	1	15	16	46	7	0	0	0	2
1970–71	Detroit Red Wings	NHL	2	0	0	0	0	—	—	—	—	—
1970–71	Fort Worth Wings	CHL	72	16	32	48	53	4	0	1	1	4
1971–72	Fort Worth Wings	CHL	72	6	35	41	89	7	1	3	4	6
1971–72	Detroit Red Wings	NHL	1	0	0	0	0	—	—	—	—	—
1972–73	Atlanta Flames	NHL	78	5	30	35	44	—	—	—	—	—
1973–74	Atlanta Flames	NHL	78	8	29	37	75	4	0	2	2	4
1974–75	Atlanta Flames	NHL	68	5	27	32	48	—	—	—	—	—
1975–76	Atlanta Flames	NHL	80	7	32	39	42	2	0	0	0	0
1976–77	Atlanta Flames	NHL	73	5	24	29	33	3	0	0	0	0
1977–78	Los Angeles Kings	NHL	79	6	27	33	61	2	0	0	0	2
1978–79	Los Angeles Kings	NHL	71	8	27	35	64	2	0	0	0	6
1979–80	Los Angeles Kings	NHL	52	6	10	16	48	—	—	—	—	—
NHL totals			582	50	206	256	415	13	0	2	2	12
