= Don Martineau =

Canadian ice hockey player

- Born: April 25, 1952; Kimberley, British Columbia, Canada
- Died: March 26, 2006 (aged 53)
- Height: 6 ft 0 in (183 cm)
- Weight: 190 lb (86 kg; 13 st 8 lb)
- Position: Right wing
- Shot: Right
- Played for: Atlanta Flames; Minnesota North Stars; Detroit Red Wings
- NHL draft: 50th overall, 1972; Atlanta Flames
- Playing career: 1972–1978

Donald Jean Martineau (April 25, 1952 - March 26, 2006) was a Canadian professional ice hockey player. He played 90 games in the National Hockey League with the Atlanta Flames, Minnesota North Stars, and Detroit Red Wings between 1973 and 1977.

== Career statistics ==
=== Regular season and playoffs ===
			Regular season					Playoffs
Season	Team	League	GP	G	A	Pts	PIM	GP	G	A	Pts	PIM
1969–70	Estevan Bruins	WCHL	56	4	3	7	106	3	0	0	0	14
1970–71	Estevan Bruins	WCHL	66	18	32	50	126	7	0	3	3	8
1971–72	New Westminster Bruins	WCHL	67	25	35	60	221	5	1	2	3	15
1972–73	Omaha Knights	CHL	72	22	28	50	170	11	1	2	3	36
1973–74	Atlanta Flames	NHL	4	0	0	0	2	—	—	—	—	—
1973–74	Omaha Knights	CHL	48	12	26	38	122	5	2	2	4	18
1974–75	Minnesota North Stars	NHL	76	6	9	15	61	—	—	—	—	—
1975–76	Detroit Red Wings	NHL	9	0	1	1	0	—	—	—	—	—
1975–76	New Haven Nighthawks	AHL	64	15	20	35	129	3	0	1	1	2
1976–77	Detroit Red Wings	NHL	1	0	0	0	0	—	—	—	—	—
1976–77	Kansas City Blues	CHL	76	27	38	65	57	10	2	1	3	2
1977–78	Kansas City Red Wings	CHL	61	16	15	31	31	—	—	—	—	—
NHL totals			90	6	10	16	63	—	—	—	—	—
