= David Shand =

Canadian retired ice hockey defenceman (born 1956)

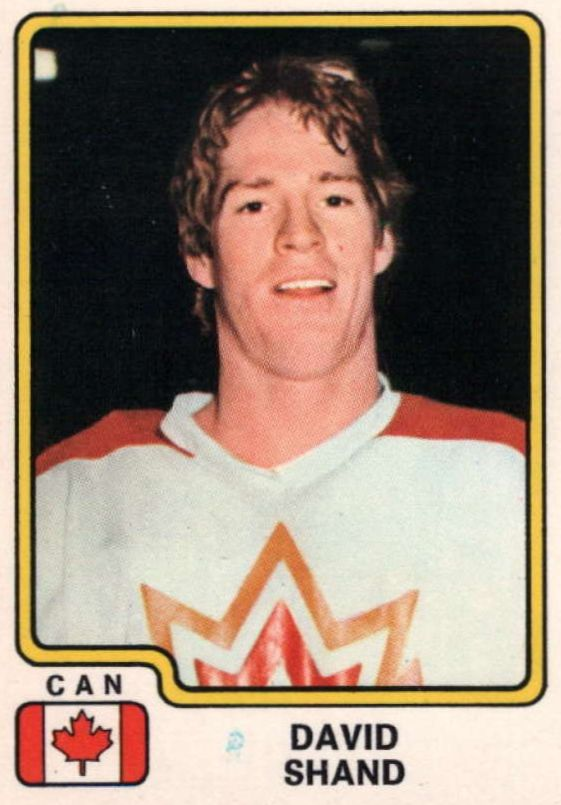
- Born: August 11, 1956 (age 70) Cold Lake, Alberta, Canada
- Height: 6 ft 2 in (188 cm)
- Weight: 200 lb (91 kg; 14 st 4 lb)
- Position: Defence
- Shot: Right
- Played for: Atlanta Flames; Toronto Maple Leafs; Washington Capitals
- NHL draft: 8th overall, 1976; Atlanta Flames
- WHA draft: 18th overall, 1976; Calgary Cowboys
- Playing career: 1976–1989
Medal record
Representing Canada
Ice hockey
World Championships
Bronze medal – third place	1978 Prague

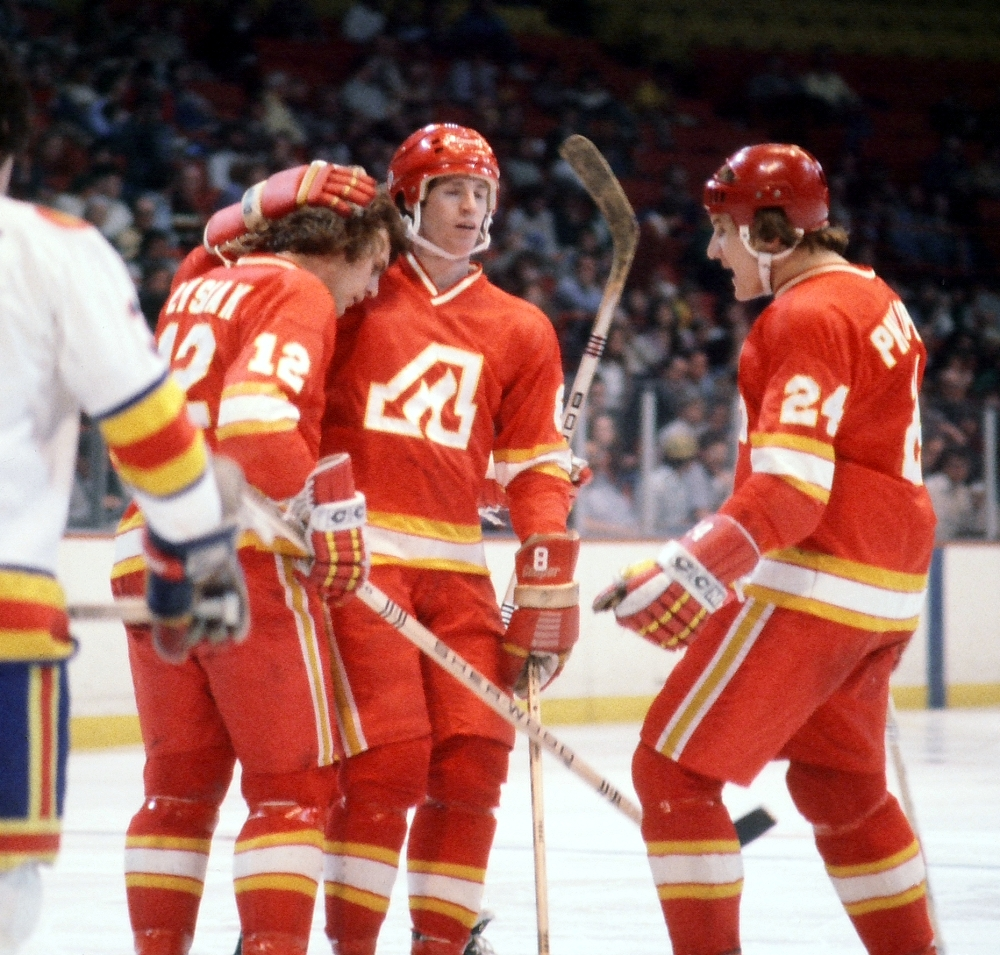
Tom Lysiak celebrates with Dave Shand (center) and Harold Phillipoff after a goal against the Colorado Rockies in 1978

David Alistair Shand (born August 11, 1956) is a Canadian former professional ice hockey defenceman. Drafted in 1976 by both the Atlanta Flames of the National Hockey League and the Calgary Cowboys of the World Hockey Association, Shand also played for the Toronto Maple Leafs and Washington Capitals.

== Hockey career ==
Shand was born in Cold Lake, Alberta and raised in Portage la Prairie, Manitoba. As a youth, he played in the 1967 and 1968 Quebec International Pee-Wee Hockey Tournaments with a minor ice hockey team from Borden, Saskatchewan. He was selected in the first round of the 1976 NHL Amateur Draft by the Atlanta Flames, as the eighth overall pick.

On April 1, 1978, he tied the Flames franchise single-game record (since broken) for assists in one game with four, versus the New York Rangers. He had previously tied the Flames franchise single-game record (since broken) with three assists in a period, versus the Rangers on January 20, 1978. Shand missed the start of 1984-85 season with a cracked sinus bone and facial laceration, suffered when he was hit below his left eye by a Scott Stevens shot during Washington's 1984 training camp. He retired from hockey in 1989.

== Post-playing career ==
Dave Shand was an assistant coach for the University of Michigan men's hockey team under head coach Red Berenson from 1989 to 1993. During his tenure as assistant coach, the team went to three straight Frozen Four college hockey tournaments.

Shand holds several degrees, including a Juris Doctor degree from the University of Michigan. Shand has also taught sports law at the university's division of Kinesiology.

Shand hosted In The Locker Room, a morning drive radio show on WTKA out of Ann Arbor, Michigan until April 23, 2007. Shand's commentaries and his life's stories were featured regularly during the radio show.

According to Michigan football blog MVictors.com, Shand was fired from WTKA because he criticized the University of Michigan, and the athletic director of the university threatened to pull coverage of Michigan football from the radio station unless he was fired.

Following his departure from WTKA, Shand began practicing law. He is well known in Michigan as a prominent attorney in private practice.

== Career statistics ==
=== Regular season and playoffs ===
			Regular season					Playoffs
Season	Team	League	GP	G	A	Pts	PIM	GP	G	A	Pts	PIM
1972–73	Toronto Nationals	MetJHL	—	—	—	—	—	—	—	—	—	—
1973–74	University of Michigan	WCHA	34	2	8	10	50	—	—	—	—	—
1974–75	University of Michigan	WCHA	10	0	4	4	20	—	—	—	—	—
1974–75	Peterborough Petes	OMJHL	33	4	11	15	30	11	1	4	5	17
1975–76	Peterborough Petes	OMJHL	62	9	37	46	169	—	—	—	—	—
1976–77	Atlanta Flames	NHL	55	5	11	16	62	3	0	0	0	33
1976–77	Nova Scotia Voyageurs	AHL	9	0	5	5	21	—	—	—	—	—
1977–78	Atlanta Flames	NHL	80	2	23	25	94	2	0	0	0	4
1978–79	Atlanta Flames	NHL	79	4	22	26	64	2	0	0	0	20
1979–80	Atlanta Flames	NHL	74	3	7	10	104	4	0	1	1	0
1980–81	Toronto Maple Leafs	NHL	47	0	4	4	60	3	0	0	0	0
1980–81	New Brunswick Hawks	AHL	2	0	0	0	2	—	—	—	—	—
1981–82	Cincinnati Tigers	CHL	76	8	37	45	206	4	0	4	4	9
1982–83	Toronto Maple Leafs	NHL	1	0	1	1	2	4	1	0	1	13
1982–83	St. Catharines Saints	AHL	69	9	32	41	154	—	—	—	—	—
1983–84	Washington Capitals	NHL	72	4	15	19	124	8	0	1	1	13
1983–84	Hershey Bears	AHL	2	0	1	1	2	—	—	—	—	—
1984–85	Washington Capitals	NHL	13	1	1	2	34	—	—	—	—	—
1984–85	Binghamton Whalers	AHL	8	0	1	1	10	—	—	—	—	—
1985–86	EC KAC	AUT	44	11	21	32	110	—	—	—	—	—
1986–87	EC KAC	AUT	26	4	21	25	95	—	—	—	—	—
1987–88	EC KAC	AUT	21	1	18	19	73	—	—	—	—	—
1988–89	EC KAC	AUT	39	5	25	30	98	—	—	—	—	—
NHL totals			421	19	84	103	544	26	1	2	3	83

=== International ===
Year	Team	Event	GP	G	A	Pts	PIM
1978	Canada	WC	10	0	3	3	6
1979	Canada	WC	7	0	0	0	8
Senior totals			17	0	3	3	14

Preceded by Richard Mulhern	Atlanta Flames first-round draft pick 1976	Succeeded by Harold Phillipoff
