= Tom Lysiak =

Canadian ice hockey player (1953–2016)

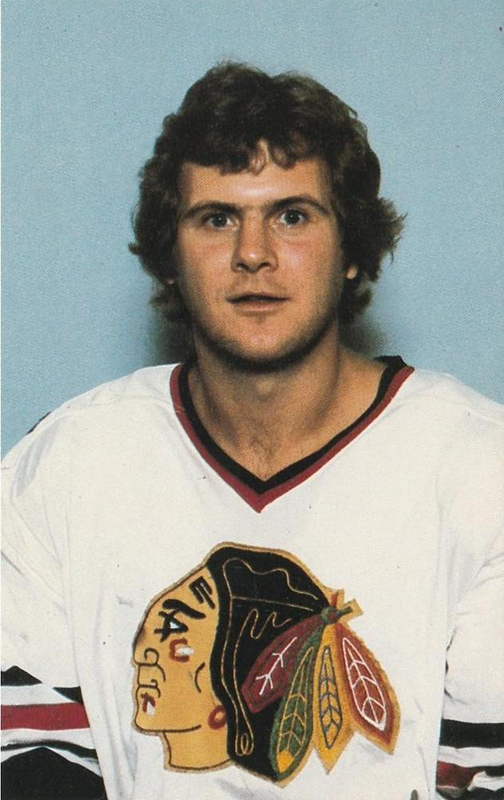
- Lysiak in 1983 photo
- Born: April 22, 1953 High Prairie, Alberta, Canada
- Died: May 30, 2016 (aged 63) Atlanta, Georgia, U.S.
- Height: 6 ft 1 in (185 cm)
- Weight: 205 lb (93 kg; 14 st 9 lb)
- Position: Centre
- Shot: Left
- Played for: Atlanta Flames; Chicago Black Hawks
- National team: Canada
- NHL draft: 2nd overall, 1973; Atlanta Flames
- WHA draft: 23rd overall, 1973; Houston Aeros
- Playing career: 1973–1986
Medal record
Representing Canada
World Championships
Bronze medal – third place	1978 Czechoslovakia

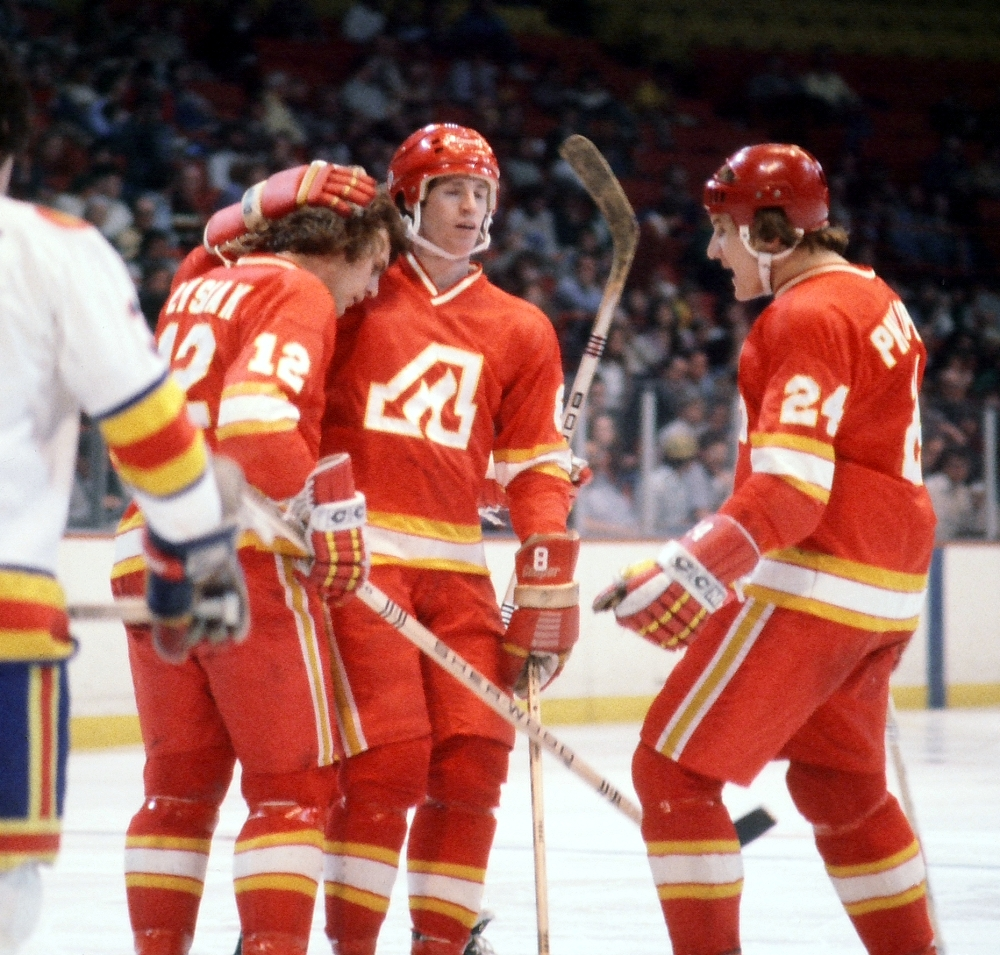
Tom Lysiak (l.) celebrates with Dave Shand and Harold Phillipoff after a goal against the Colorado Rockies in 1978

Thomas James Lysiak (April 22, 1953 – May 30, 2016) was a Canadian professional ice hockey player. Selected in the first round, second overall, of the 1973 NHL Amateur Draft by the Atlanta Flames, he was additionally selected by the Houston Aeros in the second round of the 1973 WHA Amateur Draft at 23rd overall.

In each of his last two seasons with the Medicine Hat Tigers, Lysiak was awarded the Bob Clarke Trophy as the Western Canadian Hockey League's leading scorer, with a total of 297 points in 135 games.

== Playing career ==
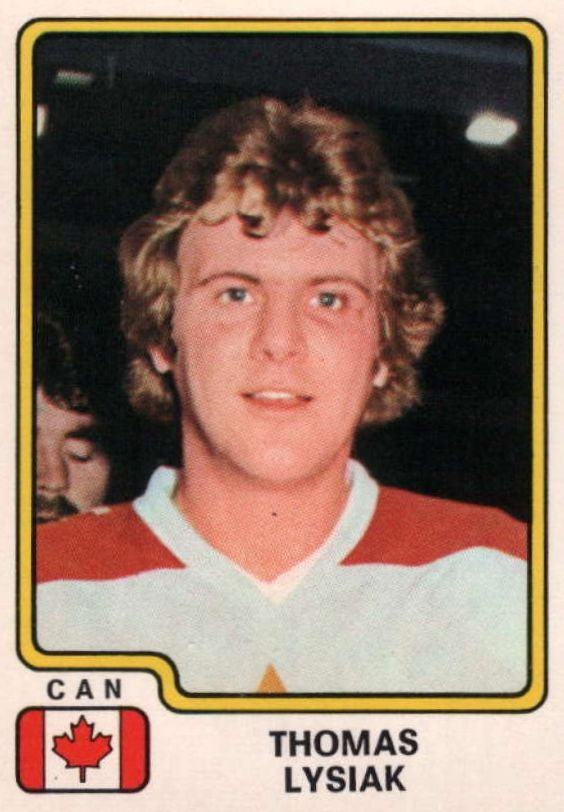
1979 card of Lysiak

Lysiak joined the Flames for the 1973–74 NHL season, the second year for the franchise, and scored a team-high 64 points. He helped the team to its first playoff berth and finished second in the voting for the Calder Memorial Trophy (top rookie).

Lysiak led the Flames in scoring in each of his five full seasons with the team and represented the Flames in three consecutive NHL All-Star Games, in 1975, 1976 and 1977. He served as the Flames' team captain during the 1977–78 and 1978–79 seasons, but he was traded to the Chicago Black Hawks in an unpopular multiplayer deal midway through the 1978–79 season. Eight players were involved in the trade, the biggest trade numbers-wise in NHL history at the time. He is the Atlanta Flames' all-time leader for assists with 276 and points with 431 and ranks second in goals with 155. He had 21 two-goal games with the Flames and one hat trick.

Lysiak played seven full seasons for Chicago and in 1980–81 led the team in scoring with 76 points, including a career-high 55 assists. The next season, 1981–82, he matched his top point-scoring season in Atlanta with 82 points and scored a career-high 32 goals.

On October 30, 1983, while a member of the Black Hawks, Lysiak tripped linesman Ron Foyt during a game against the Hartford Whalers. For the incident, the NHL imposed a 20-game suspension, one of the longest in league history.

== Personal life ==
After his retirement, Lysiak worked in the landscaping, real estate and construction industries in the Atlanta area.

In 2012, Lysiak was inducted into the National Polish-American Sports Hall of Fame.

His daughter Jessica competed on Season 4 of the US version of MasterChef in 2013, finishing in 3rd place. She is married to Philadelphia Flyers defenseman Justin Braun.

Lysiak died of leukemia in Atlanta, Georgia on May 30, 2016, at age 63, three years after he had been diagnosed with the disease in May 2013. He is related to Colorado Avalanche defenceman Cale Makar, as his cousin Gary is Makar’s father.

== Career statistics ==
=== Regular season and playoffs ===
			Regular season					Playoffs
Season	Team	League	GP	G	A	Pts	PIM	GP	G	A	Pts	PIM
1970–71	Medicine Hat Tigers	WCHL	60	14	16	30	112	—	—	—	—	—
1971–72	Medicine Hat Tigers	WCHL	68	46	97	143	96	7	7	5	12	18
1972–73	Medicine Hat Tigers	WCHL	67	58	96	154	104	17	12	27	39	48
1973–74	Atlanta Flames	NHL	77	19	45	64	54	4	0	2	2	0
1974–75	Atlanta Flames	NHL	77	25	52	77	73	—	—	—	—	—
1975–76	Atlanta Flames	NHL	80	31	51	82	60	2	0	0	0	2
1976–77	Atlanta Flames	NHL	79	30	51	81	52	3	1	3	4	8
1977–78	Atlanta Flames	NHL	80	27	42	69	54	2	1	0	1	2
1978–79	Atlanta Flames	NHL	52	23	35	58	36	—	—	—	—	—
1978–79	Chicago Black Hawks	NHL	14	0	10	10	14	4	0	0	0	2
1979–80	Chicago Black Hawks	NHL	77	26	43	69	31	7	4	4	8	0
1980–81	Chicago Black Hawks	NHL	72	21	55	76	20	3	0	3	3	0
1981–82	Chicago Black Hawks	NHL	71	32	50	82	84	15	6	9	15	13
1982–83	Chicago Black Hawks	NHL	61	23	38	61	27	13	6	7	13	8
1983–84	Chicago Black Hawks	NHL	54	17	30	47	35	5	1	1	2	2
1984–85	Chicago Black Hawks	NHL	74	16	30	46	13	15	4	8	12	10
1985–86	Chicago Black Hawks	NHL	51	2	19	21	14	3	2	1	3	2
NHL totals			919	292	551	843	567	76	25	38	63	49

=== International ===
Year	Team	Event	GP	G	A	Pts	PIM
1978	Canada	WC	7	1	1	2	4

== Awards ==
- Bob Brownridge Memorial Trophy (WCHL leading scorer) - 1972 & 1973
- WCHL First All-Star Team – 1972
- WCHL All-Star Team – 1973

== See also ==
- List of Chicago Blackhawks players

Preceded by Jacques Richard	Atlanta Flames first-round draft pick 1973	Succeeded by Vic Mercredi
Preceded by Pat Quinn	Atlanta Flames captain 1977–1979	Succeeded by Jean Pronovost
