= Dwight Bialowas =

Canadian ice hockey player

- Born: September 8, 1952 (age 73) Regina, Saskatchewan, Canada
- Height: 6 ft 2 in (188 cm)
- Weight: 190 lb (86 kg; 13 st 8 lb)
- Position: Defence
- Shot: Right
- Played for: Atlanta Flames; Minnesota North Stars
- NHL draft: 18th overall, 1972; Atlanta Flames
- Playing career: 1972–1978

Dwight Joseph Bialowas (/ˈbaɪloʊəs/ BY-loh-əs; born September 8, 1952) is a Canadian former professional ice hockey defenceman. He was drafted in the second round, 18th overall, by the Atlanta Flames in the 1972 NHL Amateur Draft. He played 164 games in the National Hockey League between 1973 and 1977: 48 with the Flames and 116 with the Minnesota North Stars.

== Regular season and playoffs ==
			Regular season					Playoffs
Season	Team	League	GP	G	A	Pts	PIM	GP	G	A	Pts	PIM
1969–70	Regina Pats	SJHL	—	5	18	23	18	—	—	—	—	—
1970–71	Regina Pats	WCHL	63	12	29	41	40	6	2	6	8	4
1971–72	Regina Pats	WCHL	61	12	39	51	45	15	1	8	9	24
1972–73	Omaha Knights	CHL	70	11	24	35	58	11	0	6	6	16
1973–74	Atlanta Flames	NHL	11	0	0	0	2	—	—	—	—	—
1973–74	Omaha Knights	CHL	30	6	12	18	22	—	—	—	—	—
1973–74	Nova Scotia Voyageurs	AHL	4	1	0	1	4	6	0	1	1	4
1974–75	Atlanta Flames	NHL	37	3	9	12	20	—	—	—	—	—
1974–75	Minnesota North Stars	NHL	40	2	10	12	2	—	—	—	—	—
1975–76	Minnesota North Stars	NHL	58	5	18	23	2	—	—	—	—	—
1975–76	New Haven Nighthawks	AHL	17	1	6	7	15	—	—	—	—	—
1976–77	Minnesota North Stars	NHL	18	1	9	10	0	—	—	—	—	—
1976–77	New Haven Nighthawks	AHL	39	4	20	24	25	6	0	1	1	0
1977–78	Fort Worth Texans	CHL	62	6	21	27	24	3	0	0	0	2
NHL totals			164	11	46	57	46	—	—	—	—	—
