= Atlanta Flames =

Former National Hockey League team (1972–1980)

- Founded: 1972
- History: Atlanta Flames; 1972–1980; Calgary Flames; 1980–present
- Home arena: Omni Coliseum
- City: Atlanta, Georgia
- Team colors: Red, yellow, white
- Stanley Cups: 0
- Conference championships: 0
- Division championships: 0

The Atlanta Flames were a professional ice hockey team based in Atlanta from 1972 until 1980. They played home games in the Omni Coliseum and were members of the West and later Patrick divisions of the National Hockey League (NHL). Along with the New York Islanders, the Flames were created in 1971 as part of the NHL's conflict with the rival World Hockey Association (WHA).

The team enjoyed modest success on the ice, qualifying for the playoffs in six of its eight seasons, but failed to win a playoff series and won only two post-season games total. The franchise was eventually sold after the 1979–80 season and relocated to Calgary, Alberta after owner and real estate developer Tom Cousins suffered massive financial losses due to the struggling 1970s economy.

Eric Vail was the Flames' top goal scorer with 174 while Tom Lysiak led with 431 points. Guy Chouinard was the lone player to score 50 goals in one season. Goaltender Dan Bouchard led the team in wins (166) and shutouts (20). Two Flames players won the Calder Memorial Trophy as the NHL's top rookie: Vail in 1974–75 and Willi Plett in 1975–76. Bob MacMillan won the Lady Byng Memorial Trophy as the most gentlemanly player in 1978–79. General manager Cliff Fletcher is the lone member of the Atlanta team to be named to the Hockey Hall of Fame.

== History ==
=== Formation ===
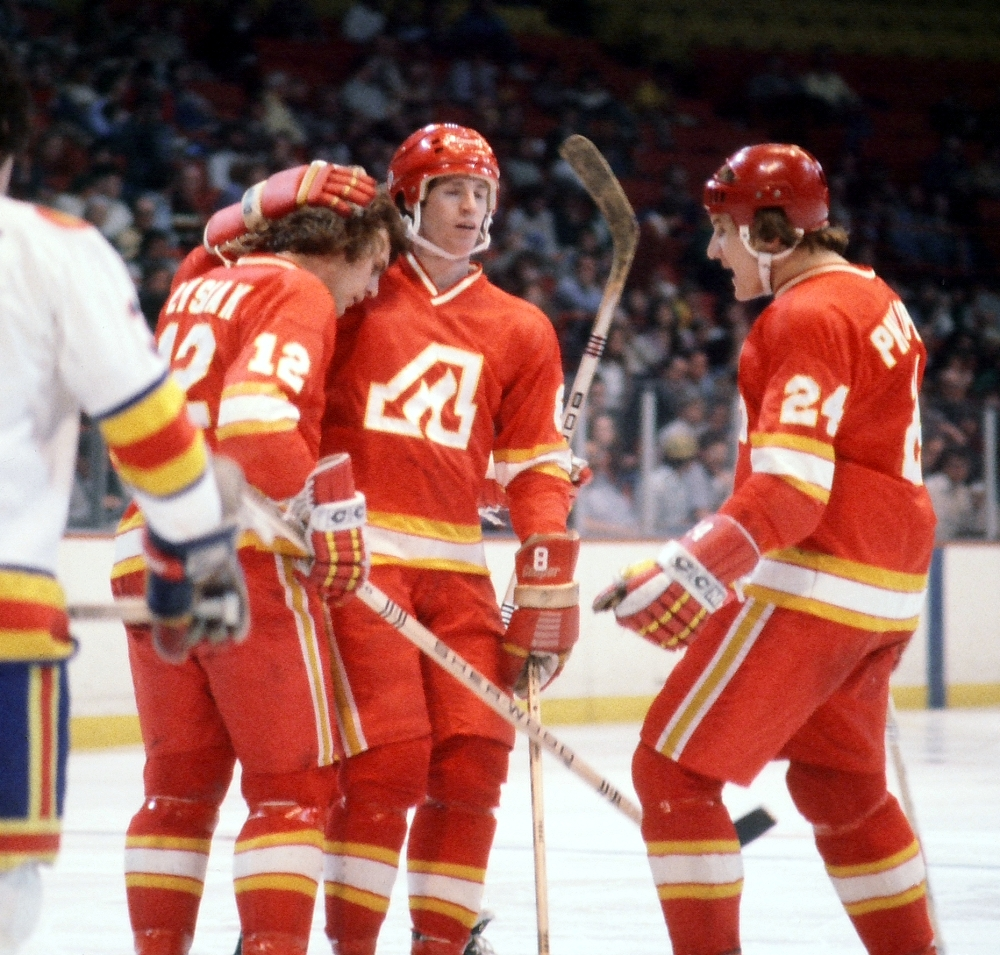
Tom Lysiak (left) celebrates with Dave Shand and Harold Phillipoff after a goal against the Colorado Rockies in 1978.

The National Hockey League (NHL), which had grown from six teams in 1966 to fourteen in 1970, had not planned further expansion until at least 1973. However, the 1971 formation of a rival major league—the World Hockey Association (WHA)—altered the NHL's plans and resulted in the two leagues battling for players and markets. The league also opted to place a team in the American South. The NHL announced on November 9, 1971, that it was expanding to Long Island and Atlanta. The Atlanta franchise was awarded to Atlanta real estate developer Tom Cousins, who also owned the Atlanta Hawks of the National Basketball Association (NBA), and would play out of the newly built Omni Coliseum. The team cost $6 million. Cousins named the franchise the Flames in homage to the burning of Atlanta by United States Army General William Sherman during the American Civil War.

The Flames hired Cliff Fletcher, formerly of the St. Louis Blues, to serve as the team's general manager. Former Montreal Canadiens player Bernie Geoffrion was hired as the team's head coach. The team stocked its roster via an expansion draft held on June 6, 1972. Fletcher focused on goaltending, choosing Phil Myre with his first selection and rookie Dan Bouchard with his second. Fletcher drafted a competent roster, but one that was young and inexperienced. Two days later, the Flames selected Jacques Richard as the second overall pick in the 1972 NHL amateur draft.

=== 1972–1975 ===
The Flames made their NHL debut in Long Island against their expansion cousins, the New York Islanders, on October 7, 1972. They won the game 3–2; Morris Stefaniw scored the first goal in franchise history and the first NHL goal in Nassau Veterans Memorial Coliseum. The team made its home debut one week later on October 14. Hosting the first event in Omni Coliseum history, the Flames tied the Buffalo Sabres, 1–1, before a sellout crowd of 14,568. The team was respectable through much of the season on the strength of Bouchard and Myre's goaltending performances, and by mid-January, had a 20–19–8 win–loss–tie record. The Flames won only five more games through the rest of the season, finishing at 25–38–15. Atlanta finished in seventh place in the West Division and missed the playoffs. The team was reasonably successful at the gate: it sold nearly 7,000 season tickets by the start of the season, and averaged 12,516 fans per game.

Tom Lysiak, selected second overall at the 1973 NHL amateur draft, joined the Flames for the 1973–74 season and made an immediate impact. Lysiak led the Flames in scoring with 64 points and finished second to the Islanders' Denis Potvin in voting for the Calder Memorial Trophy as the NHL's top rookie. Improving to 30–34–14, the Flames finished fourth in the West and qualified for the 1974 Stanley Cup playoffs. They made their post-season debut against the division-winning Philadelphia Flyers. The first game, played April 9, 1974, was a 4–1 victory for the Flyers. Philadelphia went on to defeat the Flames in their best-of-seven series with four consecutive wins. Geoffrion was praised for his coaching of the club and finished second in voting for the Jack Adams Award as top coach.

The NHL's expansion to 18 teams in 1974–75 resulted in realignment. The league moved to a four division format, placing the Flames in the Patrick Division. Lysiak repeated as the Flames' top scorer with 77 points while Eric Vail, playing his first full season, led with 39 goals. Vail's total led all rookies and earned him the Calder Trophy. The team overcame an eight-game losing streak in December and injuries to several key players to post their first winning season with a 34–31–15 record. However, they finished fourth in the Patrick Division and failed to qualify for the post-season. Citing personal reasons, Geoffrion resigned as head coach late in the season. He was replaced by Fred Creighton, who had been coaching the Flames' minor league affiliate, the Omaha Knights. Fletcher later credited Geoffrion's outgoing personality as being the primary reason why people in Atlanta followed the Flames in the franchise's first seasons while the team's players later stated an appreciation for Creighton's more technical coaching and teaching style.

=== 1975–1980 ===
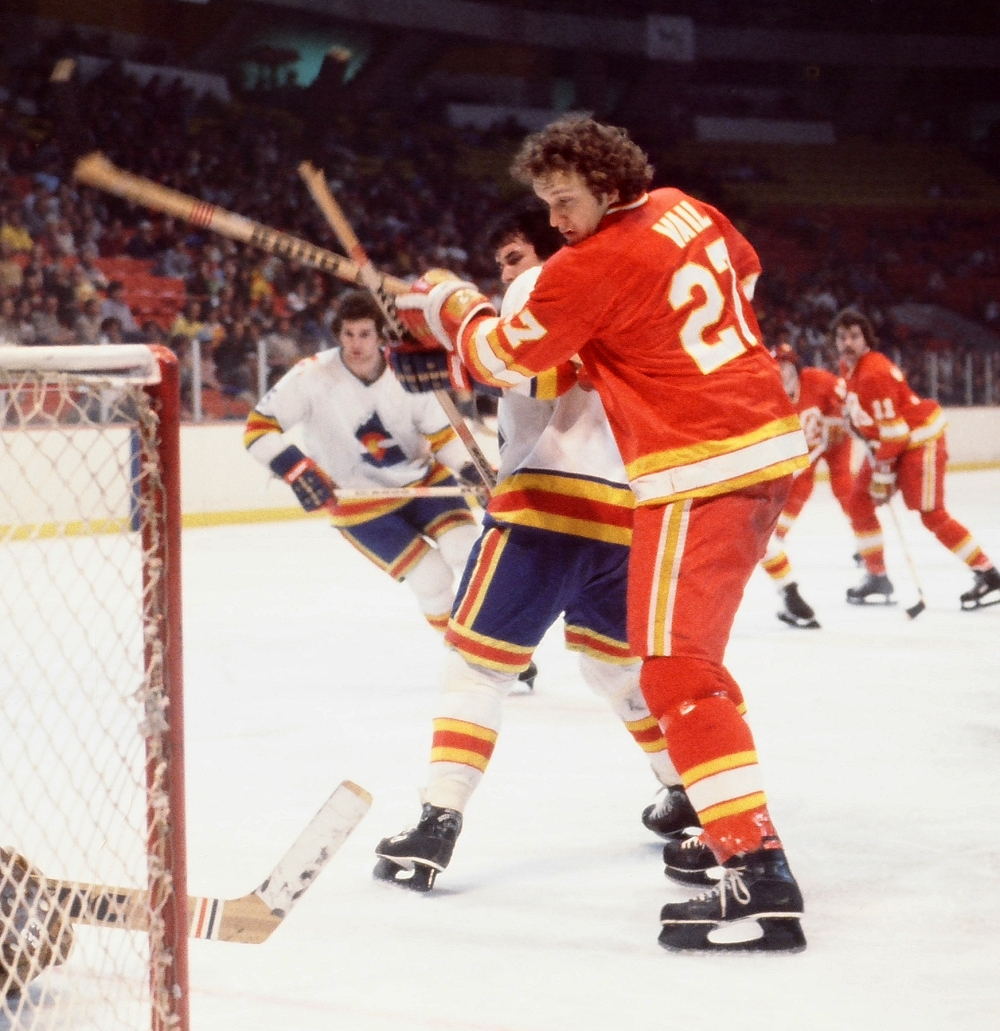
Eric Vail battles for position in front of the net against the Colorado Rockies in 1978.

Creighton produced a consistent, but not outstanding team, as the Flames finished third in the Patrick for the following three seasons and typically won a few games more than they lost each year. The team qualified for the playoffs all three years, but lost in the preliminary round each time. In 1975–76, they were defeated by the Los Angeles Kings in a best of three series, two games to none. The Kings again eliminated the Flames in 1976–77, but Atlanta earned its first playoff victory in franchise history in the second game of the series. Vail scored the game-winning goal in a 3–2 victory over the Kings on April 7, 1977, but the Flames were eliminated in the third game. Willi Plett, who was selected 80th overall in the 1975 draft, emerged as a young star for the Flames. He scored 33 goals in his rookie season in 1976–77 and won the Calder Trophy.

Seeking to improve his team's fortunes, Fletcher made several moves over the following seasons to rework the Flames roster. His goaltending tandem of Bouchard and Myre had begun to feud with each other by the 1977–78 season as both sought more playing time. Fletcher responded by naming Bouchard his number one goaltender and trading Myre to the St. Louis Blues for three players. They made it into the playoffs again but were the only team to fall to a team with fewer points than them, the Detroit Red Wings, in a best-of-three series, two games to none. In March 1979, Fletcher completed an eight player trade that sent franchise-leading scorer Tom Lysiak and four players to the Chicago Black Hawks for three players, led by defenseman Phil Russell. Fletcher hoped the addition of Russell would help his team achieve playoff success.

Buoyed by a franchise record ten-game winning streak in October 1978, the 1978–79 Flames posted the best record in their Atlanta years at 41–31–8. Bob MacMillan, acquired in the Myre deal, became the first Flame other than Lysiak to lead the team in scoring in six years and, along with Guy Chouinard, was one of the first two Flames' players to score 100 points in one season. Chouinard also became the team's first 50-goal scorer. MacMillan won the Lady Byng Memorial Trophy that season as the NHL's most gentlemanly player. In the playoffs against the Toronto Maple Leafs, Atlanta again failed to win a game as they lost a best of three series two games to none.

Fletcher continued to alter his team's make-up throughout the 1979–80. Al MacNeil replaced Creighton as head coach prior to the season, and the team acquired Swedish star Kent Nilsson following the demise of the WHA. Nilsson led Atlanta in scoring with 40 goals and 53 assists. At the 1979 NHL entry draft, Fletcher selected four players – Paul Reinhart, Jim Peplinski, Pat Riggin and Tim Hunter – who would ultimately become regulars in the Flames line up. However, while the Flames again qualified for the playoffs in 1980, they again lost in the first round, losing a best-of-five series to the New York Rangers three games to one.

=== Relocation ===
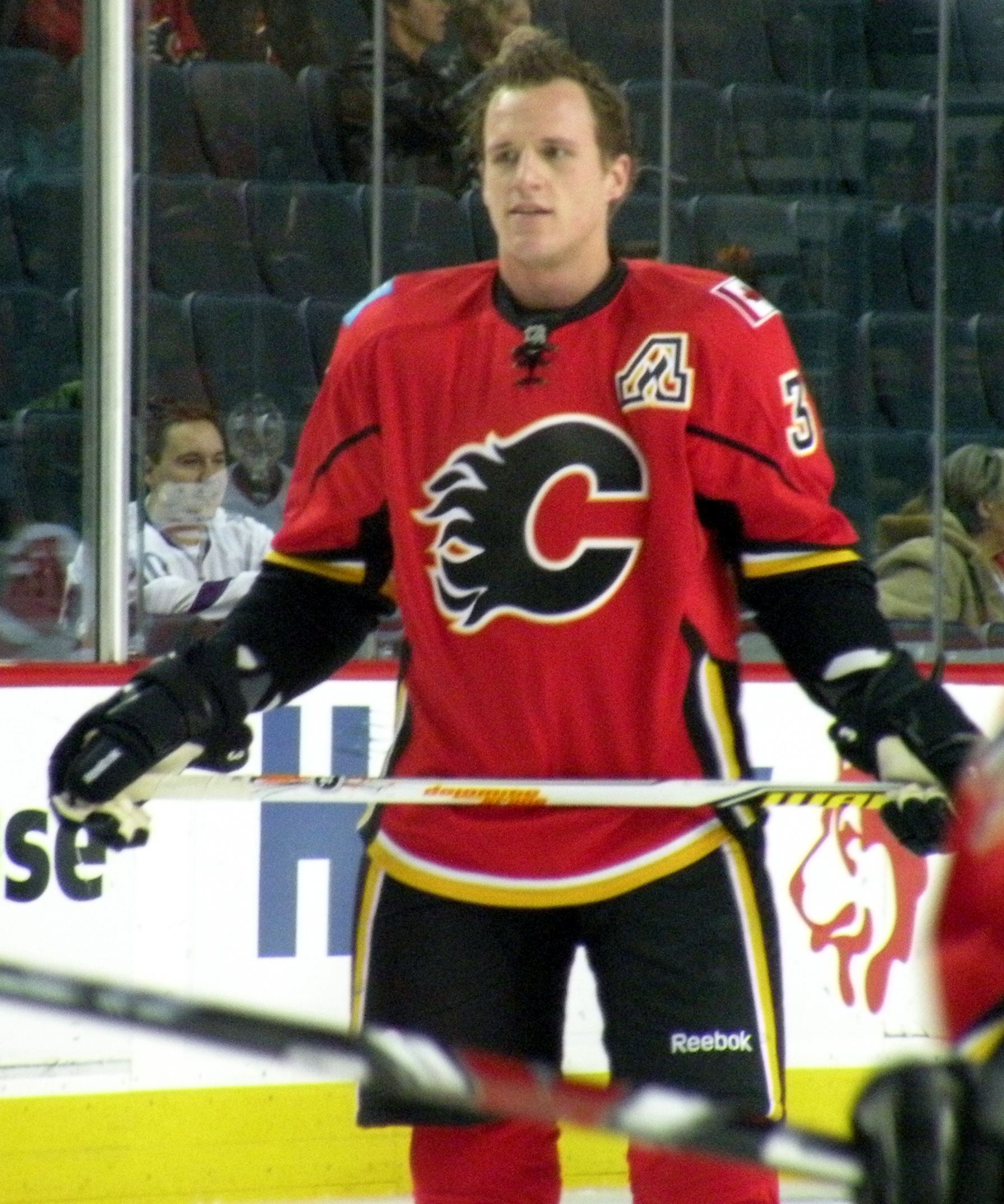
The Calgary Flames recognized their tenure in Atlanta by using the "Flaming A"' logo to denote alternate captains from 1996 to 2021, as seen here on Dion Phaneuf.

As the team stagnated on the ice, the Flames struggled at the gate. They peaked at an average of 14,161 fans per game in their second season, 1973–74, but fell to 12,258 three years later and then 10,500 in 1977–78. Concerns that low attendance could result in the relocation of the team surfaced by 1976, prompting politicians and the players themselves to purchase tickets in a bid to stabilize the franchise. The Flames attempted to boost attendance in 1980 by signing Jim Craig, goaltender of the American Olympic team that had won the Olympic gold medal following its "Miracle on Ice" victory over the Soviet Union. It was not successful as attendance fell to an average of 10,024. Adding to the Flames' financial woes was that the Omni Coliseum was one of the last major arenas in North America to be built without revenue-generating luxury suites, which led Fletcher to describe the facility as being "out-of-date when it opened".

Cousins announced he was seeking to sell the club following the Flames' exit from the playoffs. Their final game, a 5–2 loss against the New York Rangers, was played in Atlanta on April 12, 1980. He claimed to have suffered significant financial losses on the team while low viewership hampered his ability to sign a television contract. Additionally, the real estate crunch of the 1970s hit Cousins especially hard. Most of his money not tied up in his real estate interests was tied up in the Flames, leading him to put the Flames on the market. The Flames, estimated to have lost $12 million in its eight years, had been rumored for months to be moving to Calgary, though Dallas and Houston were also mentioned as possible destinations. Dallas got an NHL team in 1993 when the Minnesota North Stars relocated to the city to become the Dallas Stars.

The Seaman brothers, Daryl and Byron, had made an offer of $14 million while the City of Calgary prepared to build a new arena for the team. However, Canadian businessman Nelson Skalbania emerged as a rival bidder for the team before joining the Calgary consortium. The group agreed to purchase the Flames for $16 million, at the time the highest price ever paid for an NHL franchise. The sale was announced on May 21, 1980, and the franchise relocated to Canada where it became the Calgary Flames. The Flames have since used the Atlanta logo for both its alternate captains, and the team's former affiliate that played in the American Hockey League (AHL), the Adirondack Flames.

The last Atlanta Flames player on the Calgary roster was Paul Reinhart, upon being traded to Vancouver Canucks after the 1987–88 season. The last active Atlanta Flames player in the NHL was Kent Nilsson, who returned to the NHL for six games in 1995, after spending the prior seven seasons in European leagues. Before his return to the NHL, that distinction belonged to Brad Marsh, who retired at the end of the 1992–93 season.

Several former players of the team returned to Atlanta once their careers ended. Among them, Tom Lysiak operated a horse farm outside the city, Eric Vail returned to operate a nightclub and Willi Plett operated a sporting theme park and golf course. Fletcher would remain the team's general manager until 1991, steering the team to two appearances in the Stanley Cup Final and a Cup victory in 1989.

== Atlanta Thrashers ==
The NHL returned to Atlanta in 1999, when the Atlanta Thrashers joined the league as an expansion franchise. The Flames and Thrashers were however in opposing conferences; this meant that the Flames, who were in the Western Conference, would play one game in Atlanta annually until the 2010–11 season, when the Thrashers announced that they were sold and relocating to Winnipeg, Manitoba, becoming the second incarnation of the Winnipeg Jets. Atlanta is the only other city besides Quebec City to have lost two NHL teams, in both cases, relocating to Western Canada.

The NHL uses the abbreviation AFM to distinguish player records of the Atlanta Flames from both the Thrashers (ATL) and the Calgary Flames (CGY).

== Uniform ==
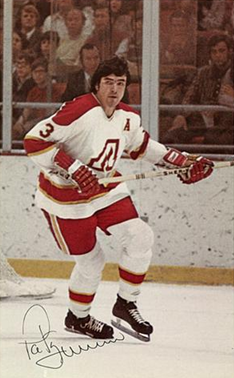
1972 photo of Pat Quinn with the white Flames uniform

In their eight-year history, the Atlanta Flames wore red and white uniforms with yellow accents. This set generally had contrasting color stripes with yellow borders along the sleeves, socks and tail. A red shoulder stripe adorned the white uniforms. They carried this set over to Calgary following the relocation, replacing the "flaming A" with the "flaming C" decal in front. The "flaming A" was later used by the Calgary Flames to denote alternate captains.

== Season-by-season record ==
The Flames had a 268–260–108 regular season record, and a 2–15 playoff record.

== Notable personnel ==
=== Team captains ===
- Keith McCreary 1972–1975
- Pat Quinn 1975–1977
- Tom Lysiak 1977–1979
- Jean Pronovost 1979–1980

=== Award winners ===
Three members of the Flames were named recipients of NHL awards during the team's tenure in Atlanta. Eric Vail was the first, as he won the Calder Memorial Trophy as the top rookie in 1974–75 after scoring 39 goals and finishing with 60 points. Paraguayan-born Willi Plett won the award two years later after scoring 33 goals and 23 assists in his first full NHL season. Bob MacMillan was named the league's most gentlemanly player in 1978–79, which earned him the Lady Byng Memorial Trophy. He finished fifth overall in league scoring with 104 points while accruing only 14 penalty minutes throughout the season.

Seven players represented the Flames at the NHL All-Star Game. Randy Manery became the team's first all-star when he played in the 1973 contest. He was subsequently joined by Al McDonough (1974), Tom Lysiak (1975, 1976 and 1977), Curt Bennett (1975 and 1976), Eric Vail (1977), Bill Clement (1978) and Kent Nilsson (1980).

=== Hockey Hall of Fame ===
There are four members of the Atlanta Flames organization to be enshrined in the Hockey Hall of Fame:

- Bernie Geoffrion, was also inducted into the player category in 1972, the same year he joined the Flames organization as the Flames' first head coach.
- Cliff Fletcher, a native of Montreal, began his career in hockey management as a scout for the Montreal Canadiens in 1956 and rose to the position of assistant general manager with the St. Louis Blues before being hired in 1972 as the inaugural and lone general manager of the Atlanta Flames. Fletcher remained with the organization for another 11 years following its transition to Calgary and was the architect of the franchise's lone Stanley Cup championship, in 1989. He was inducted into the Hockey Hall of Fame in 2004 as a builder.
- Pat Quinn played with the Atlanta Flames from 1972 to 1977 was inducted in 2016 as a builder for coaching various teams around the NHL.
- David Poile an executive with the Flames served in various roles from 1972 to 1982 before moving on to the Washington Capitals was inducted in 2024.

No Atlanta Flames player has been inducted into the players category.

=== Broadcasters ===
All of the Flames' radio and television broadcasts were simulcasts. The Flames' games were televised over-the-air on WTCG 17 and on the radio by WSB (AM). Jiggs McDonald was the main play-by-play announcer, with Skip Caray substituting from 1976–80. Color commentators included Andy Still (1972–73), Bob Neal (1973–74), Ed Thilenius (1974–75; home and televised games only), Bernie Geoffrion (1975–79), and Bobby Harper (1979–80; home games only). Pete Van Wieren also did play-by-play for the Flames.

== Scoring leaders ==
These are the top ten scorers for the franchise during its time in Atlanta.

Note: GP = games played, G = goals, A = assists, Pts = points, PIM = penalties in minutes

Points
Player	Pos	GP	G	A	Pts	PIM
Tom Lysiak	C	445	155	276	431	329
Eric Vail	LW	469	174	209	383	223
Guy Chouinard	F	318	126	168	294	56
Curt Bennett	C	405	126	140	266	190
Bob MacMillan	RW	208	90	131	221	50
Rey Comeau	F	468	88	126	214	153
Ken Houston	RW	350	91	108	199	332
Bill Clement	C	297	69	107	176	136
Willi Plett	RW	296	91	83	174	738
Randy Manery	D	377	30	142	172	242

== Individual records ==
=== Single-season ===
- Most goals – Guy Chouinard, 50 (1978–79)
- Most assists – Bob MacMillan, 71 (1978–79)
- Most points – Bob MacMillan, 108 (1978–79)
- Most penalty minutes – Willi Plett, 231 (1979–80)
- Most points, defenseman – Paul Reinhart, 47 (1979–80)
- Most points, rookie – Tom Lysiak, 64 (1973–74)
- Most wins – Dan Bouchard, 32 (1978–79)

=== Career ===
- Games – Eric Vail, 469
- Goals – Eric Vail, 174
- Assists – Tom Lysiak, 276
- Points – Tom Lysiak, 431
- Penalty minutes – Willi Plett, 738
- Goaltender games – Dan Bouchard, 384
- Goaltender wins – Dan Bouchard, 164
- Shutouts – Dan Bouchard, 20
