= List of Calgary Flames players =

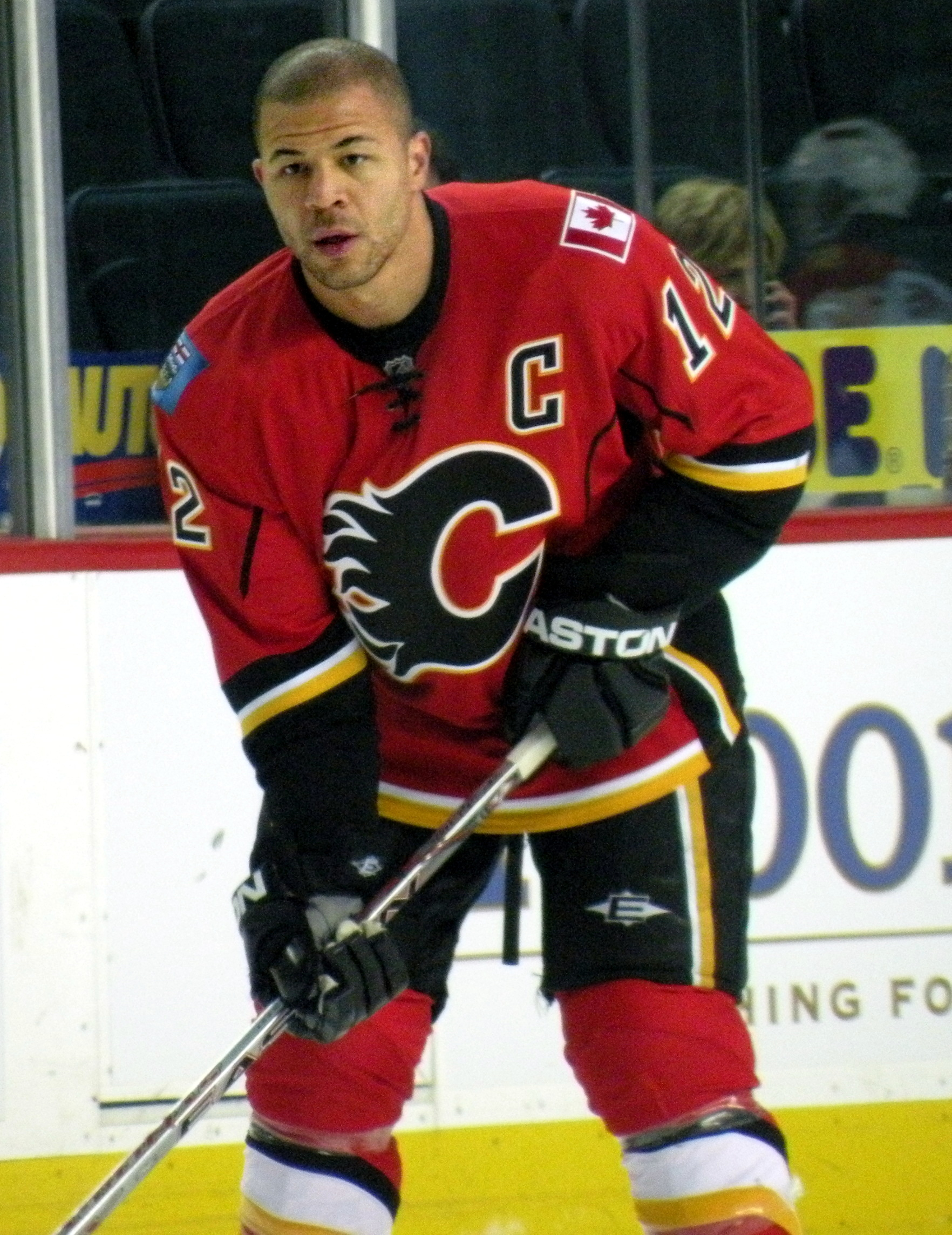
Jarome Iginla is a former Flames captain, and the franchise's all-time leading point scorer.

The Calgary Flames are a professional hockey team based in Calgary, Alberta, Canada. They are members of the Pacific Division of the Western Conference in the National Hockey League (NHL). Since their arrival in 1980, nearly 400 players have worn the Flames jersey for at least one regular season or playoff game. The Flames have won the Stanley Cup once, in 1989, and four players have been elected into the Hockey Hall of Fame; the most recent electee is Jarome Iginla, who was enshrined in 2021.

Fourteen players have served as the captain of the Calgary Flames, beginning with Brad Marsh in 1980–81. Doug Risebrough, Jim Peplinski and Lanny McDonald served together as co-captains in the 1980s; the latter two led the Flames to the 1989 Stanley Cup. The team's longest serving player, is Jarome Iginla. Iginla joined the Flames for the 1996 Stanley Cup playoffs and, as of 2024, is the Flames' all-time leader in games played, points and goals scored. Currently, the Flames captaincy is held by Mikael Backlund, who was named to the position prior to the start of the 2023–24 NHL season.

== Key ==
Stanley Cup winner Appeared in a Flames game during the 2025–26 season

Abbreviations
Nat	Nationality
GP	Games played
SC	Stanley Cup winner
HHOF	Hockey Hall of Fame inductee

Goaltenders
W	Wins	SO	Shutouts
L	Losses	GAA	Goals against average
T	Ties	SV%	Save percentage
OTL	Overtime loss		

Skaters
Pos	Position	RW	Right wing	A	Assists
D	Defenceman	C	Centre	P	Points
LW	Left wing	G	Goals	PIM	Penalty minutes

== Goaltenders ==
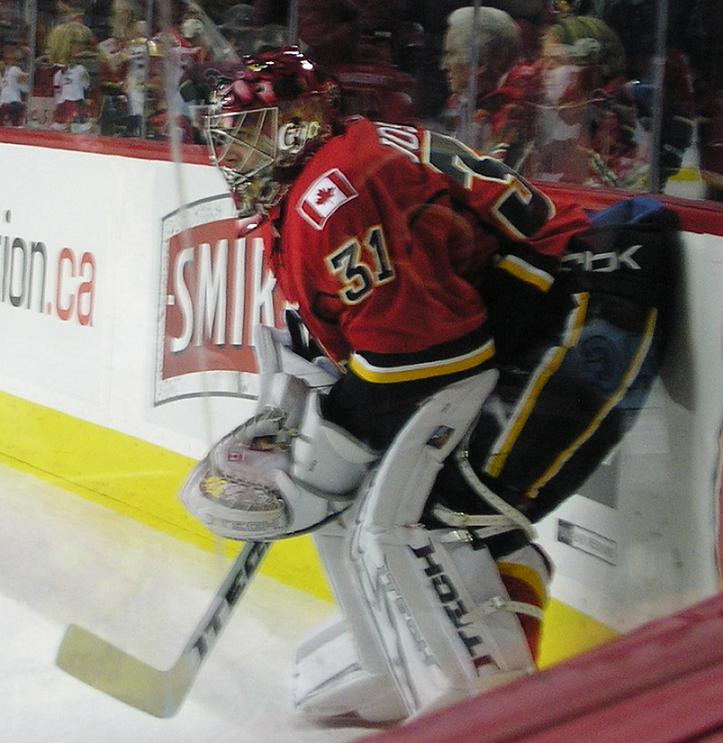
Curtis Joseph joined the Flames as a free agent in 2008.

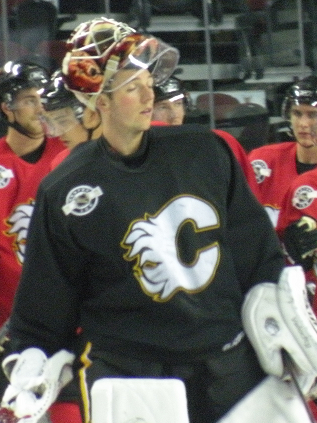
Matt Keetley made his NHL debut with the Flames in 2007–08.

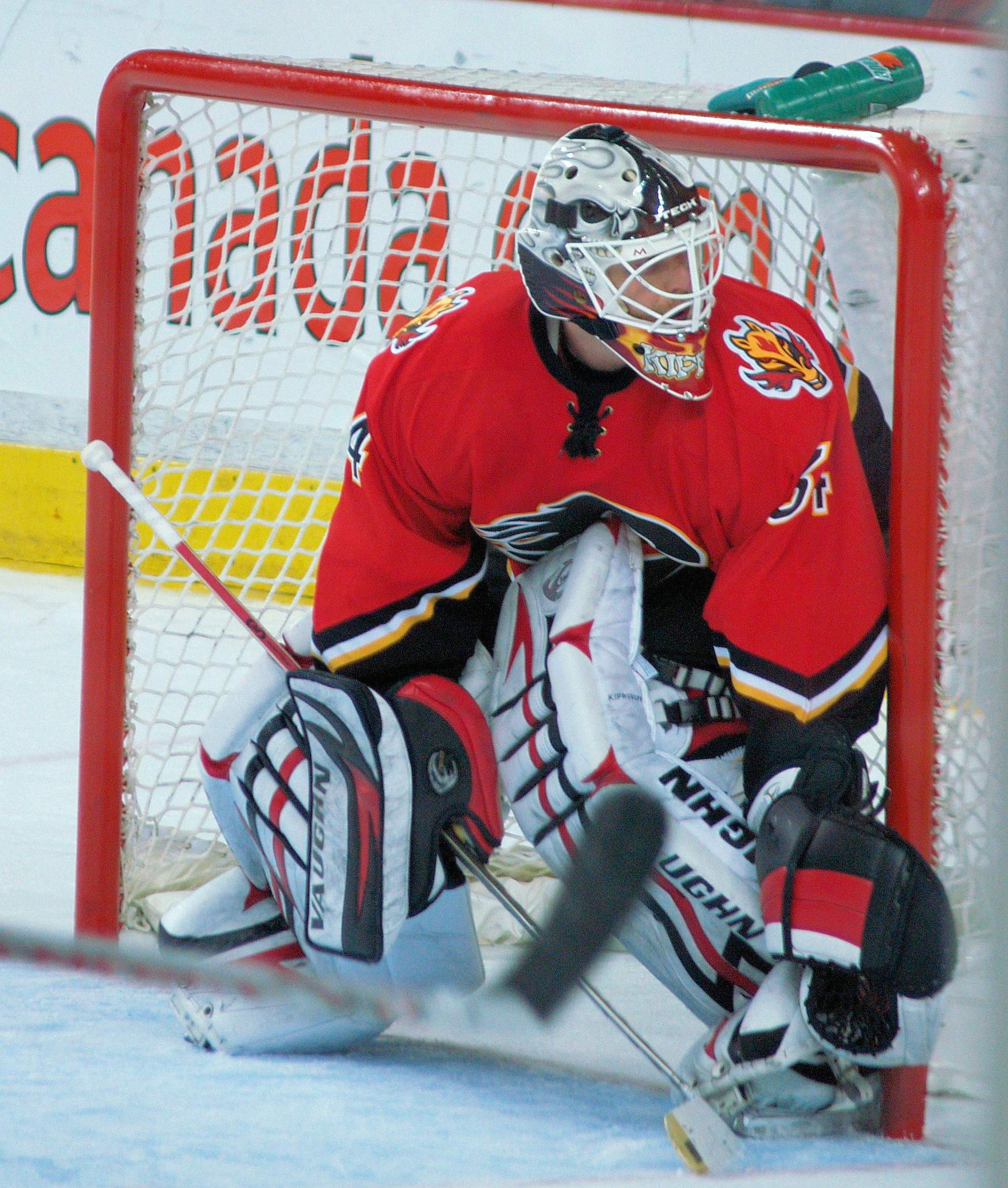
In 2005–06, Miikka Kiprusoff became the first Flames goaltender to win the Vezina Trophy.

Note: Statistics are complete as of the end of the 2025–26 NHL season.

Name	Nationality	Seasons	GP	W	L	T	OTL	SO	GAA	SV%	GP	W	L	SO	GAA	SV%	Notes
Name	Nationality	Seasons	Regular-season								Playoffs						Notes
Niklas Backstrom	Finland	2015–2016	4	2	2		0	0	3.35	.881							
Tim Bernhardt	Canada	1982–1983	6	0	5	0		0	4.50	.857							
Reto Berra	Switzerland	2013–2014	29	9	17		2	0	2.95	.892							
Dan Bouchard	Canada	1980–1981	14	4	5	3		0	4.03								
Brian Boucher	United States	2005–2006	3	1	2	0		0	4.95	.854							
Fred Brathwaite	Canada	1998–2001	138	51	51	24		11	2.54	.915							
Devin Cooley	United States	2025–2026	31	10	10		6	0	2.69	.909							
Marc D'Amour	Canada	1985–1986	15	2	4	2		0	3.43								
Doug Dadswell	Canada	1986–1988	27	8	8	3		0	4.41	.859							
Louis Domingue	Canada	2020–2021	1	0	1		0	0	3.12	.870							
Don Edwards	Canada	1982–1985	114	40	49	13		2	4.06		11	5	6	0	4.60		
Brian Elliott	Canada	2016–2017	49	26	18		3	2	2.55	.910	4	0	3	0	3.89	.880	
Grant Fuhr	Canada	1999–2000	23	5	13	2		0	3.83	.856							HHOF 2003
Tyrone Garner	Canada	1998–1999	3	0	2	0		0	5.18	.838							
Jean-Sebastien Giguere	Canada	1998–2000	22	7	10	2		0	3.07	.904							
Jon Gillies	United States	2016–2018	12	4	5		1	0	2.71	.903							
Steve Guenette	Canada	1989–1991	3	2	1	0		0	4.02	.850							
Jonas Hiller	Switzerland	2014–2016	78	35	30		5	2	2.73	.905	7	3	3	0	2.61	.919	
Leland Irving	Canada	2011–2013	13	3	4		4		3.25	.902							
Chad Johnson	Canada	2016–2017	36	18	15		1	3	2.59	.910	1	0	1	0	1.15	.952	
Curtis Joseph	Canada	2007–2008	9	3	2		0	0	2.55	.906	2	1	0	0	0.76	.970	
Henrik Karlsson	Sweden	2010–2012	26	5	9		8	0	2.79	.905							
Matt Keetley	Canada	2007–2008	1	0	0		0	0	0.00	1.000							
Trevor Kidd	Canada	1991–1997	178	72	66	26		10	2.83	.898	9	3	5	1	4.06		
Miikka Kiprusoff	Finland	2003–2013	576	305	192	4	63	41	2.47	.913	46	22	22	6	2.21	.924	
Eddie Lack	Sweden	2017–2018	4	1	2		0	0	5.29	.813							
Rejean Lemelin	Canada	1980–1987	303	136	90	45		6	3.67		30	11	15	1	3.99		
Joey MacDonald	Canada	2012–2014	32	13	13		2	0	2.88	.898							
Jacob Markstrom	Sweden	2020–2024	213	105	78		25	15	2.63	.907	12	5	7	1	2.95	.901	
Curtis McElhinney	Canada	2007–2010	29	4	12		1	0	3.23	.889							
Jamie McLennan	Canada	2002–2004; 2006–2007	57	17	25	8		4	2.73	.900	1	0	0	0	0.00		
Tyler Moss	Canada	1997–1999	17	5	10	1		0	2.81	.914							
Jason Muzzatti	Canada	1993–1995	2	0	1	0		0	6.86	.814							
Joni Ortio	Finland	2013–2016	37	15	15		5	2	2.66	.901							
Karri Ramo	Finland	2013–2016	110	49	42		8	5	2.63	.911	7	2	3	0	2.86	.906	
Jeff Reese	Canada	1991–1994	39	17	6	3		1	3.39	.883	4	1	3	0	4.88	.813	
Pat Riggin	Canada	1980–1982	94	40	35	15		2	4.05		14	6	7	0	3.43		
David Rittich	Czech Republic	2016–2021	130	63	39		15	4	2.83	.908	1	0	1	0	10.85	.667	
Dwayne Roloson	Canada	1996–1998	70	20	30	11		1	2.95	.899							
Dany Sabourin	Canada	2003–2004	4	0	3	0		0	3.55	.848							
Philippe Sauve	United States	2005–2006	8	3	3	0		0	3.28	.891							
Arsenii Sergeev	Russia	2025–2026	1	1	0		0	0	1.00	.964							
Scott Sharples	Canada	1991–1992	1	0	0	1		0	3.69	.900							
Mike Smith	Canada	2017–2019	97	48	38		8	5	2.68	.909	5	1	4	0	3.20	.917	
Rick Tabaracci	Canada	1994–1998	97	36	42	10		4	2.81	.901	4	0	3	0	1.88	.930	
Cam Talbot	Canada	2019–2020	26	12	10		1	2	2.63	.919	10	5	4	2	2.42	.924	
Danny Taylor	Canada	2012–2013	2	1	1		0	0	3.00	.912							
Andrei Trefilov	Russia	1992–1995; 1998–1999	22	3	10	3		2	3.20	.896							
Vesa Toskala	Finland	2009–2010	6	2	0		0	0	2.27	.918							
Roman Turek	Czech Republic	2001–2004	152	63	68	20		12	2.53	.909	1	0	0	0	0.00	1.000	
Mike Vernon	Canada	1982–1994; 2000–2002	526	259	170	13		13	3.26	.883	81	43	35	3	3.02	.888	SC 1989; Ret #30
Daniel Vladar	Czech Republic	2021–2025	100	47	32		15	4	2.97	.895	1	0	0	0	0.00	1.000	
Rick Wamsley	Canada	1987–1992	111	53	30	15		4	3.21	.878	4	0	3	0	8.65	.651	SC 1989
Dustin Wolf	United States	2022–2026	128	60	52		12	5	2.85	.903							
Ken Wregget	Canada	1998–1999	27	10	12	4		1	2.53	.906							
Artyom Zagidulin	Russia	2020–2021	1	0	0		0	0	4.25	.818							

== Skaters ==
Note: Statistics are complete as of the end of the 2025–26 NHL season.

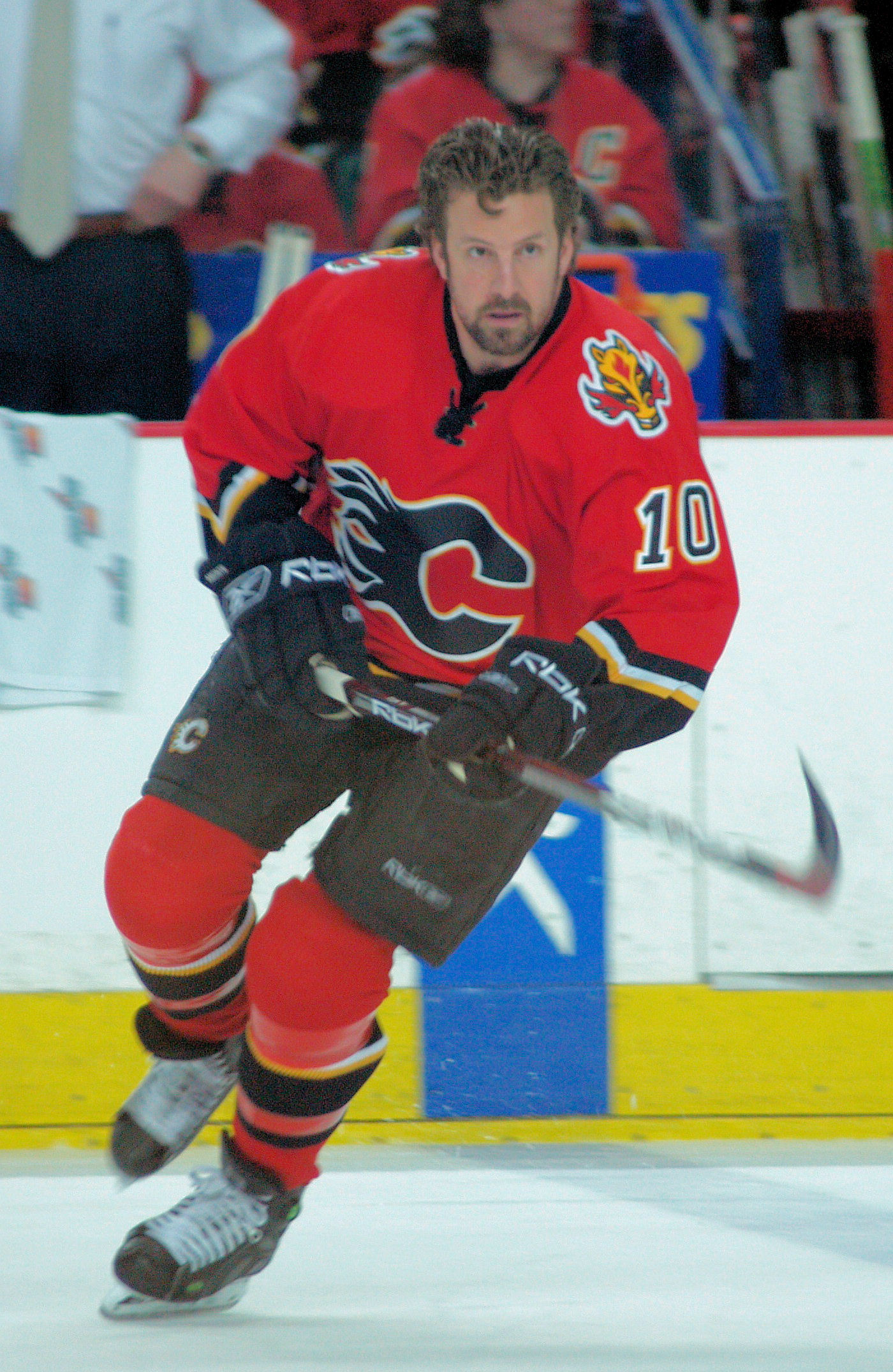
Tony Amonte spent two seasons in Calgary from 2005 to 2007.

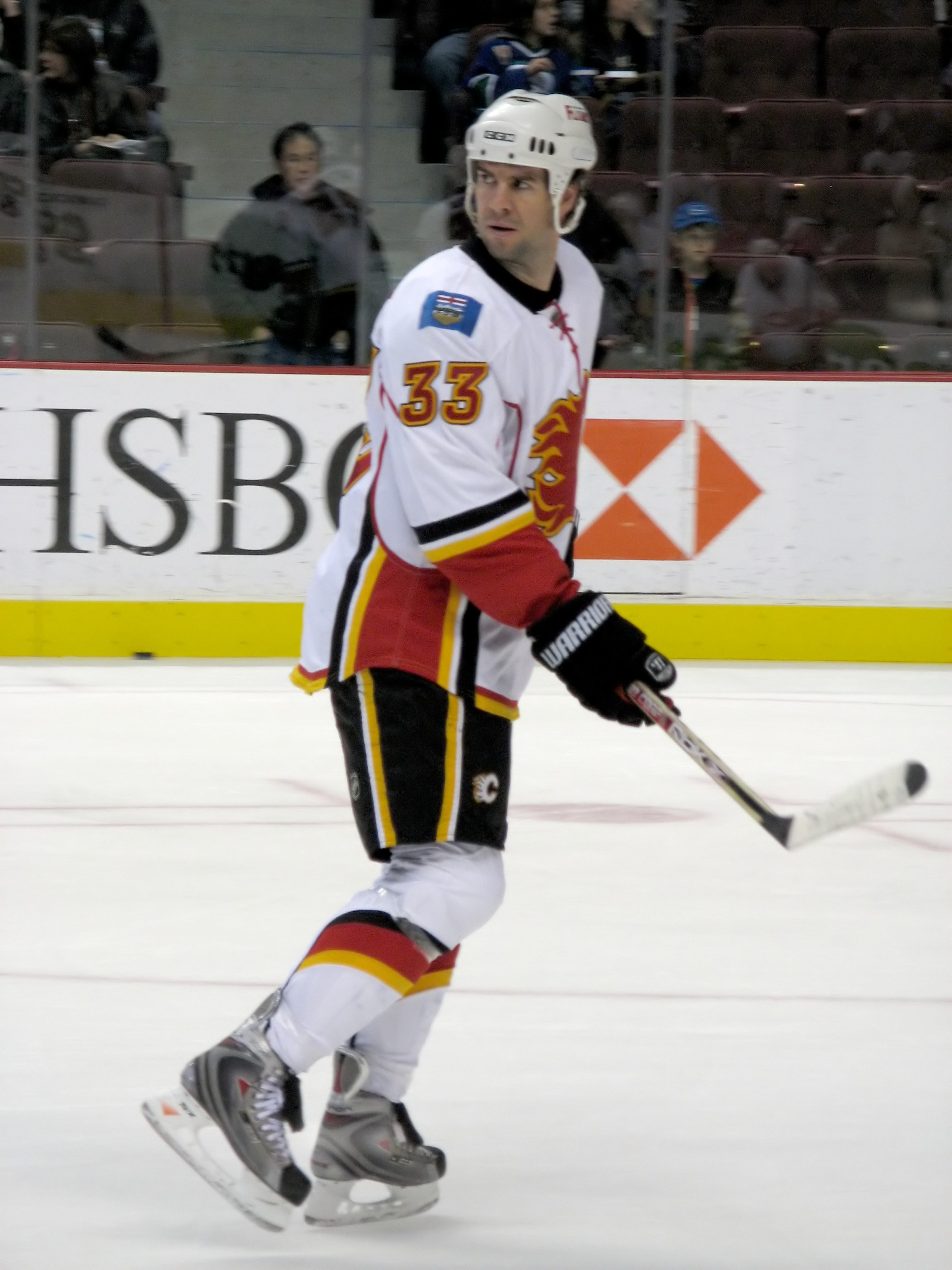
Adrian Aucoin joined the Flames in 2007 following a trade with Chicago.

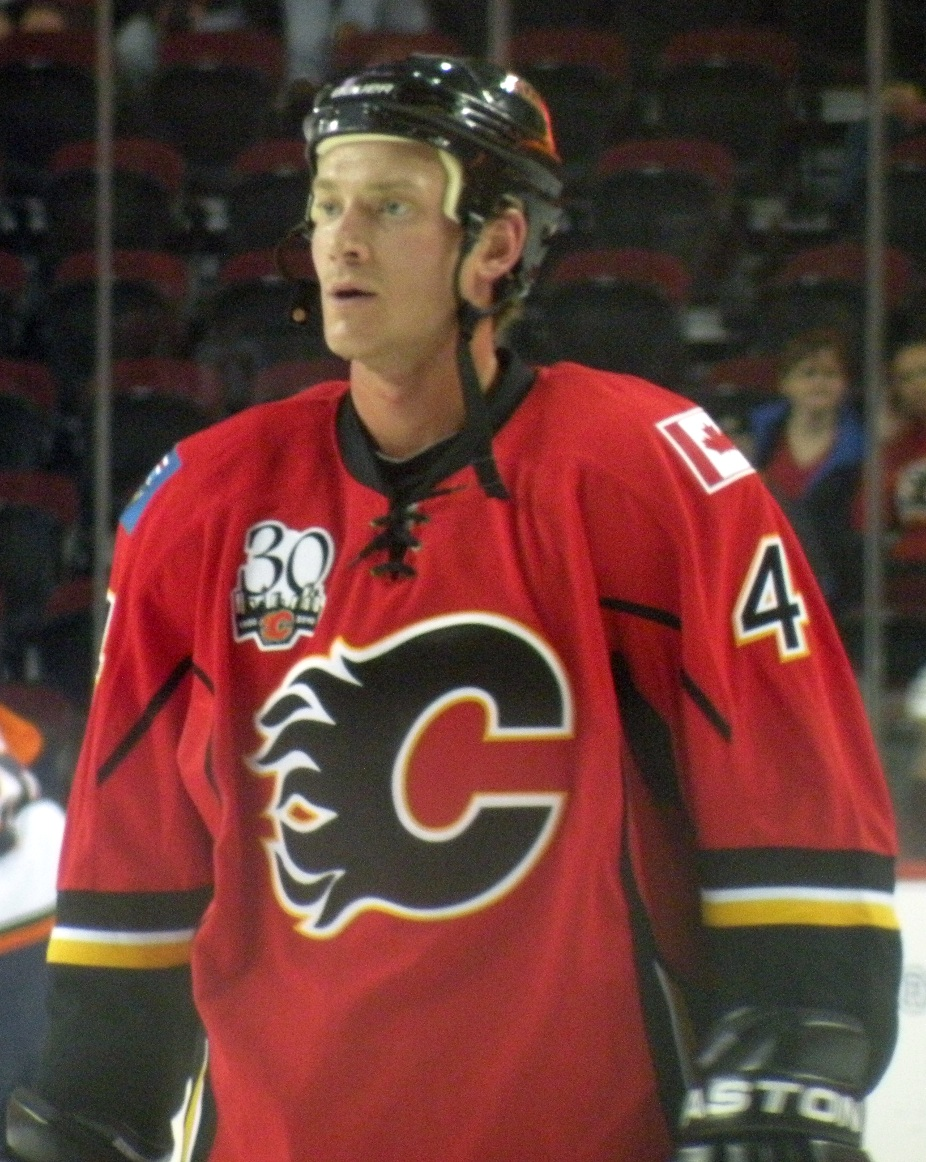
Jay Bouwmeester joined the Flames in 2009 after signing a five-year contract with the team.

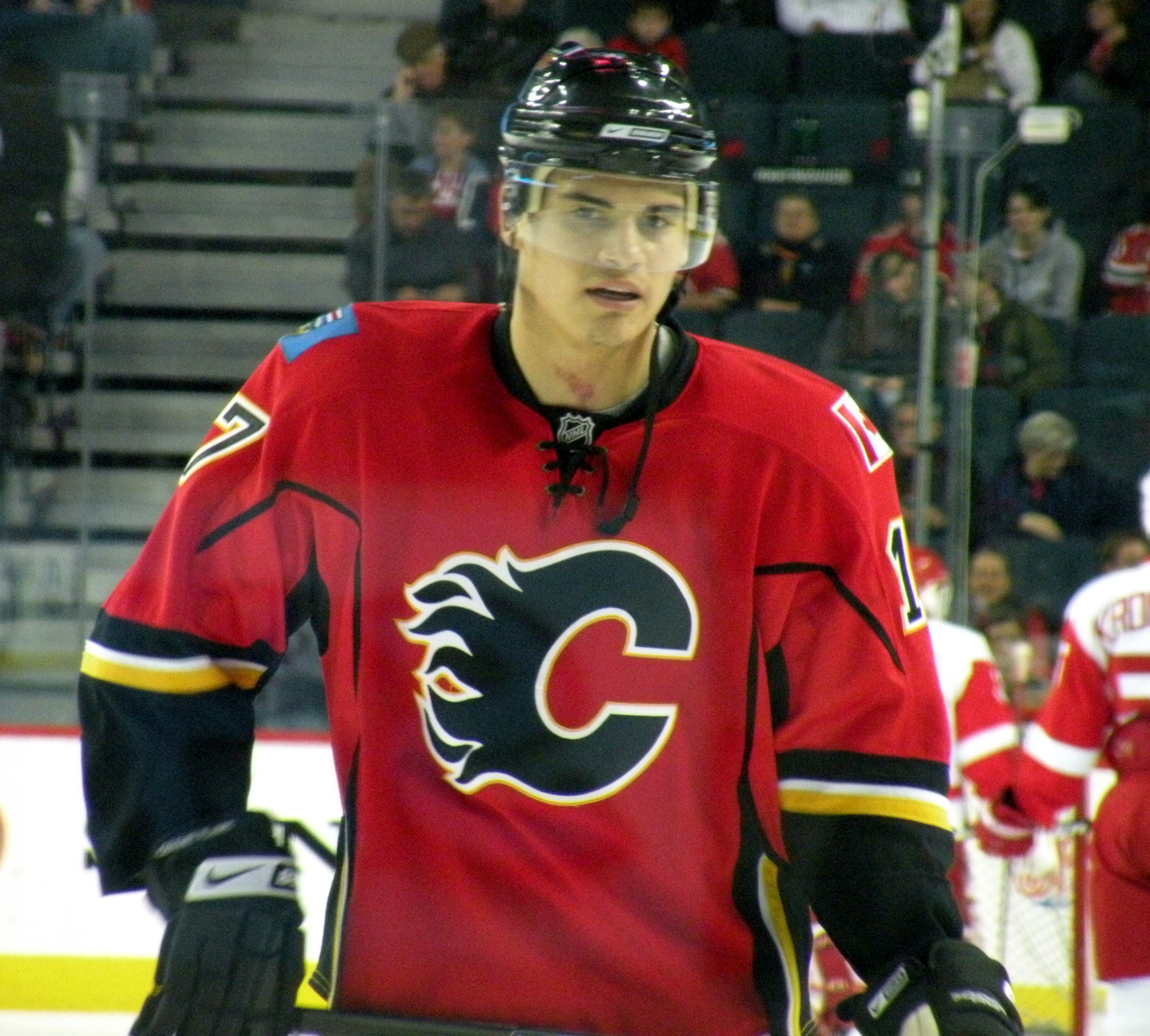
Rene Bourque was acquired by the Flames in a 2008 trade with the Blackhawks.

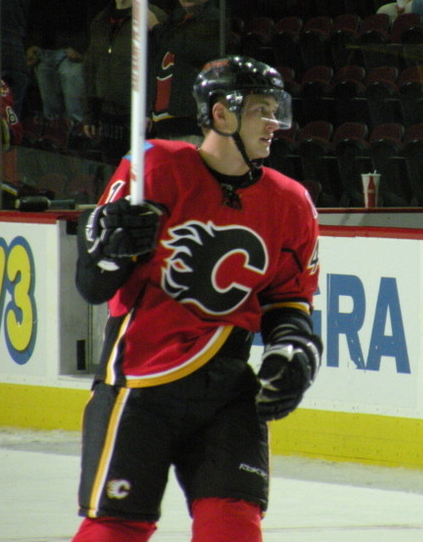
Dustin Boyd played his fourth season with the Flames in 2009–10, but was traded during the season.

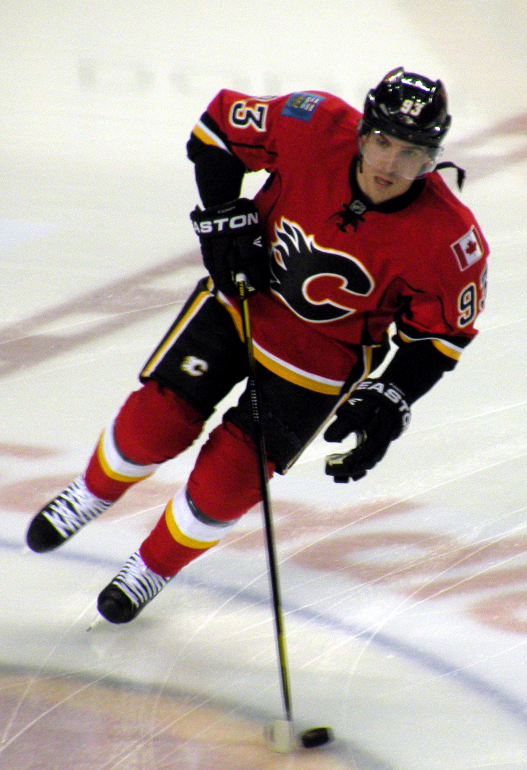
After scoring 39 goals in his lone season with the Flames in 2008–09, Mike Cammalleri returned from Montreal to Calgary in 2012.

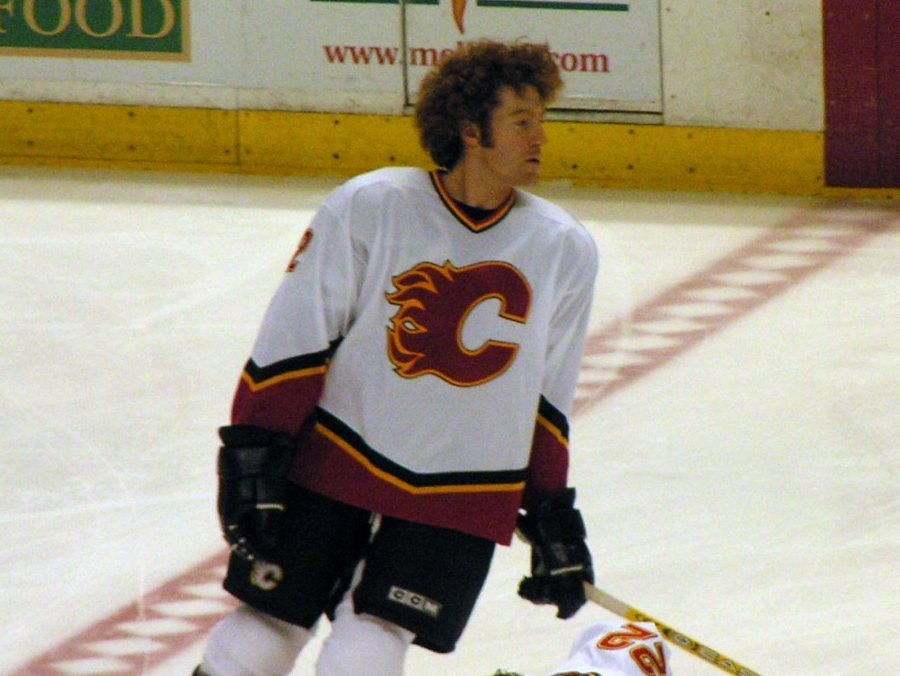
Mike Commodore played only 18 regular season games in Calgary, but was a popular member of the Flames' 2004 Stanley Cup Final run.

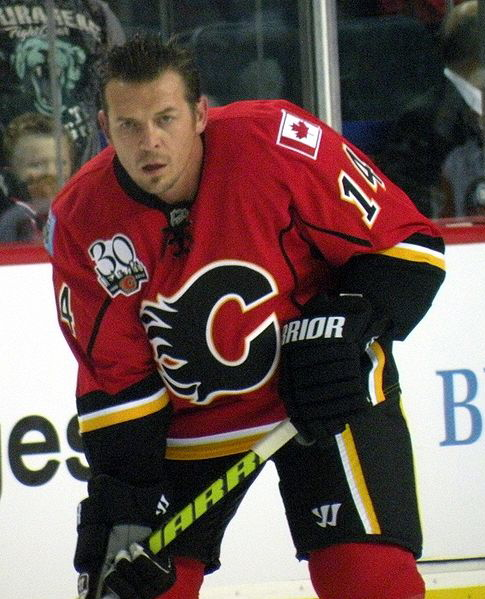
Theoren Fleury attempted an NHL comeback with the Flames in 2009.

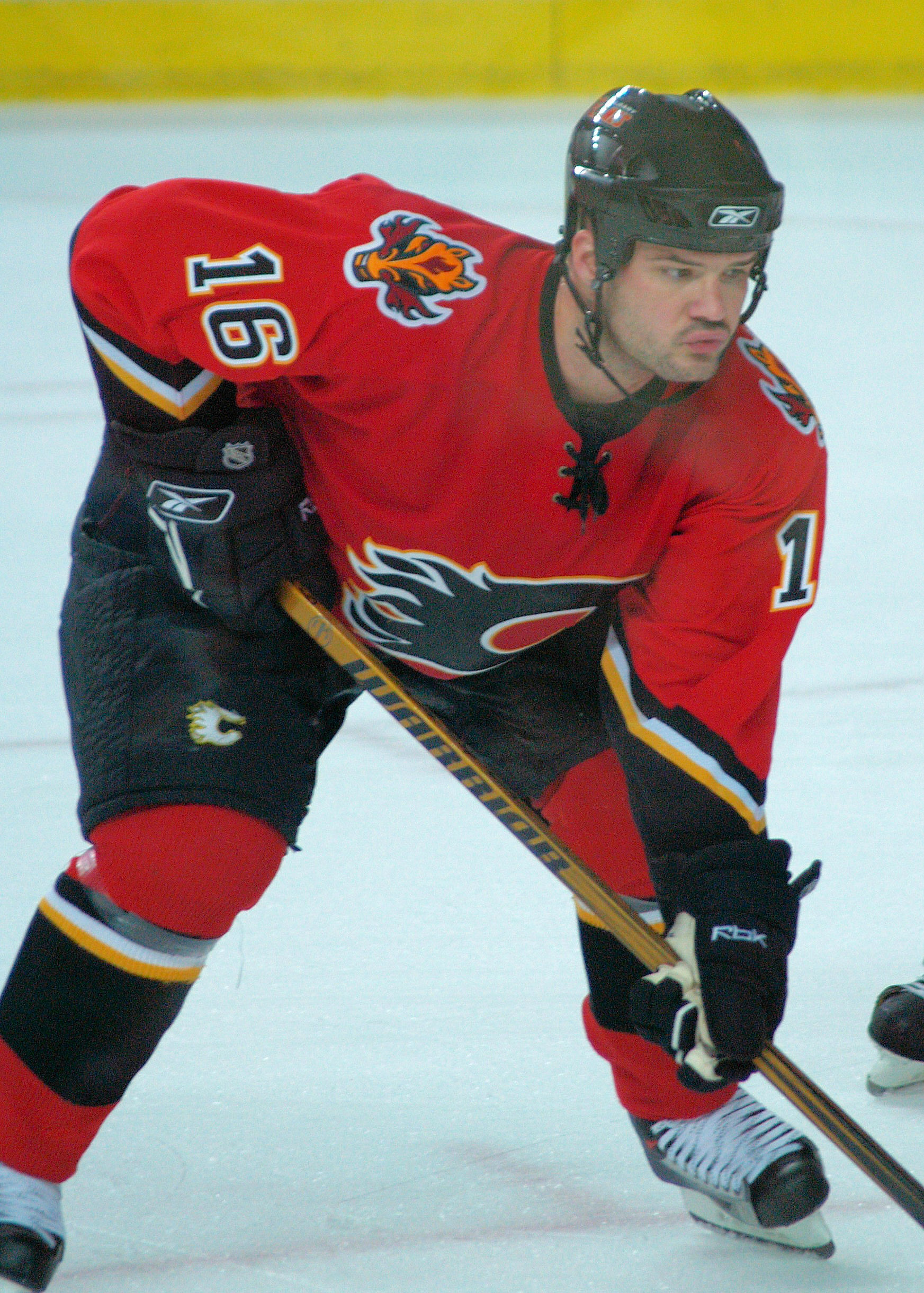
Jeff Friesen was a member of the Flames in 2006–07.

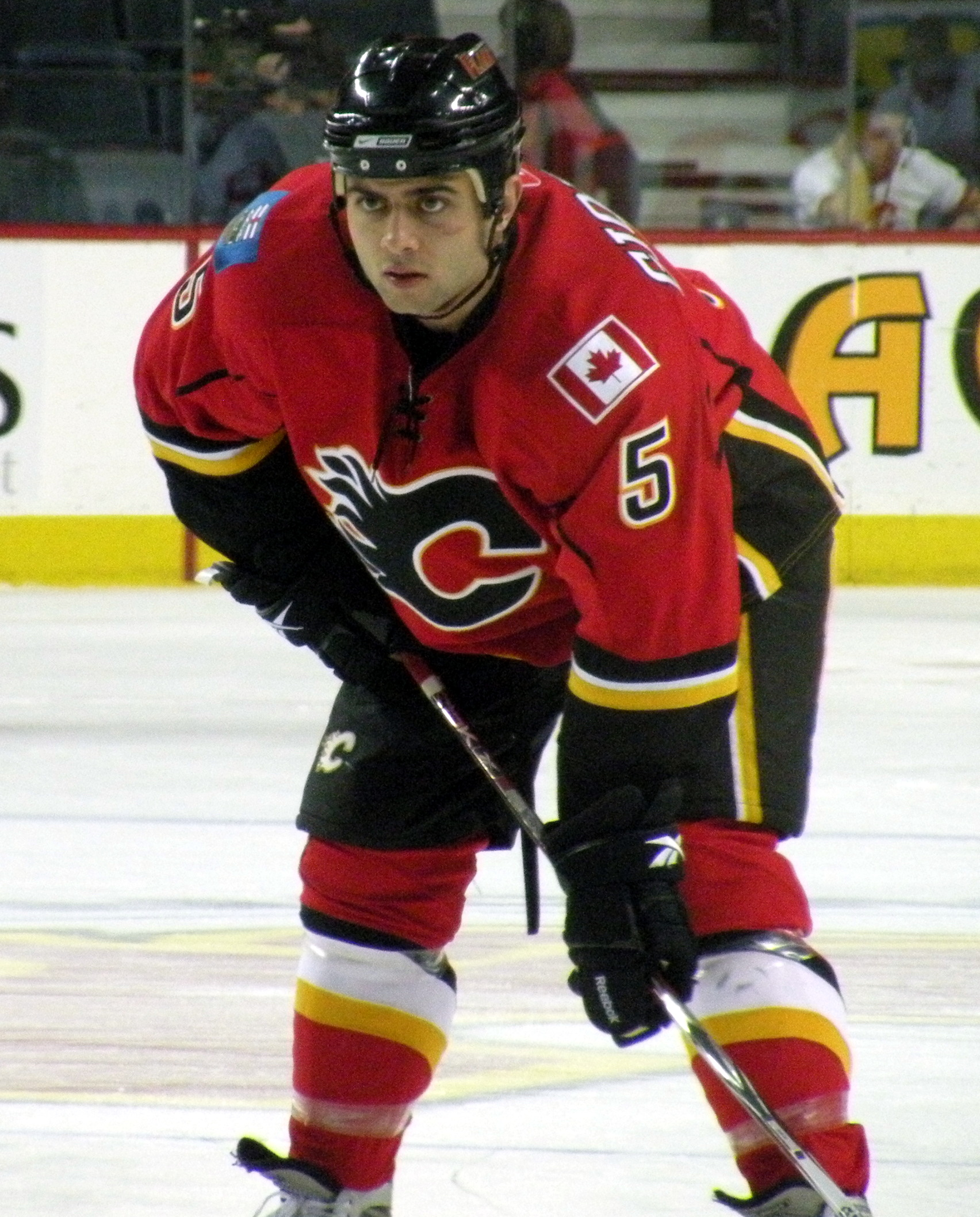
Though he was never drafted, Mark Giordano has become a regular on the Flames' blueline.

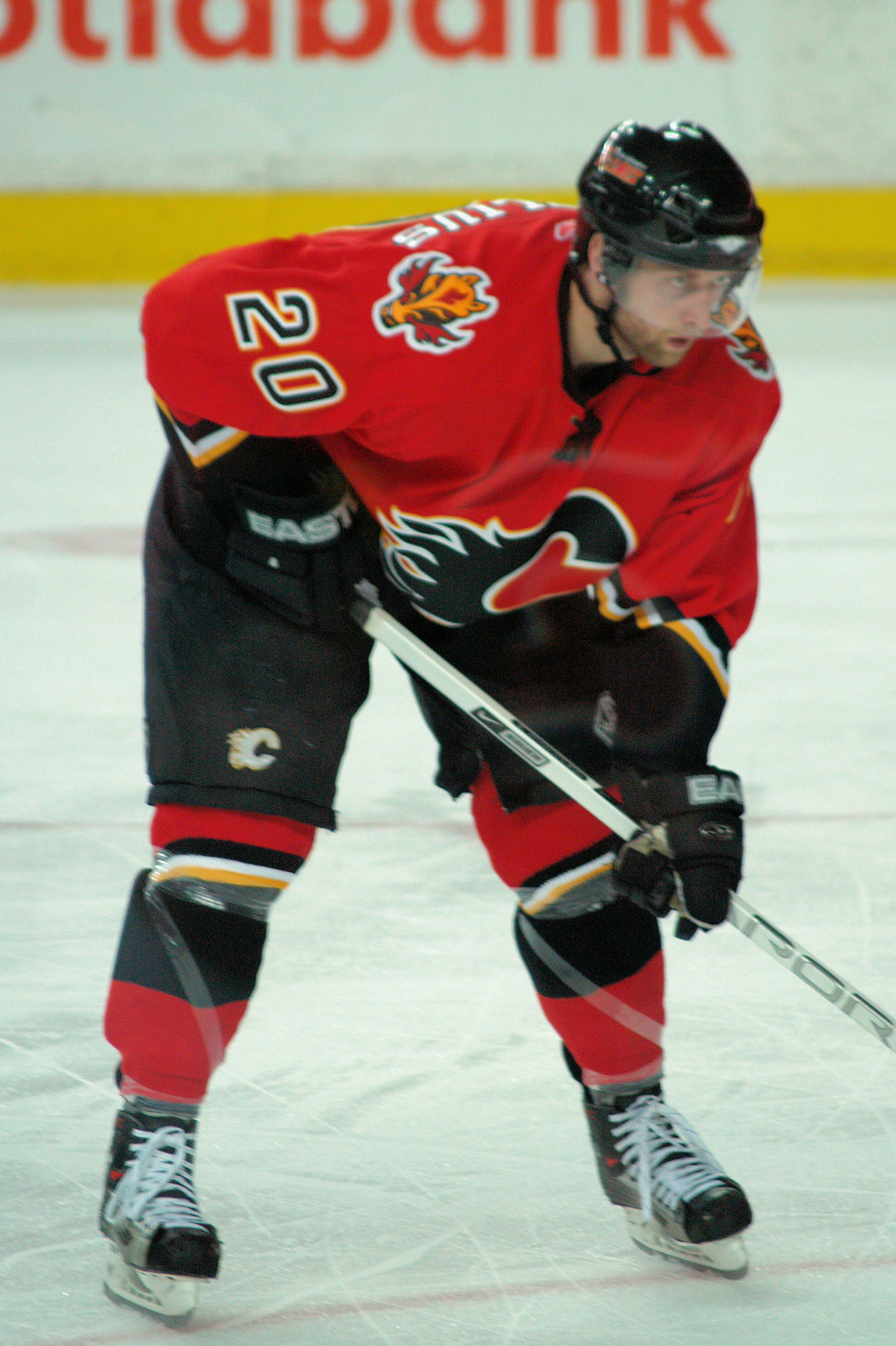
Kristian Huselius enjoyed his first 30-goal season with the Flames in 2006–07.

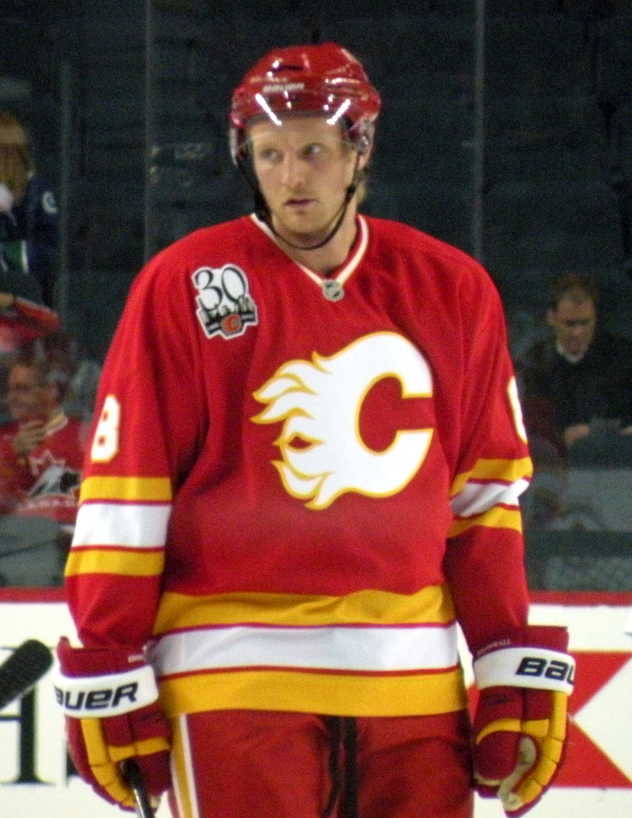
Staffan Kronwall is the younger brother of Detroit's Niklas Kronwall.

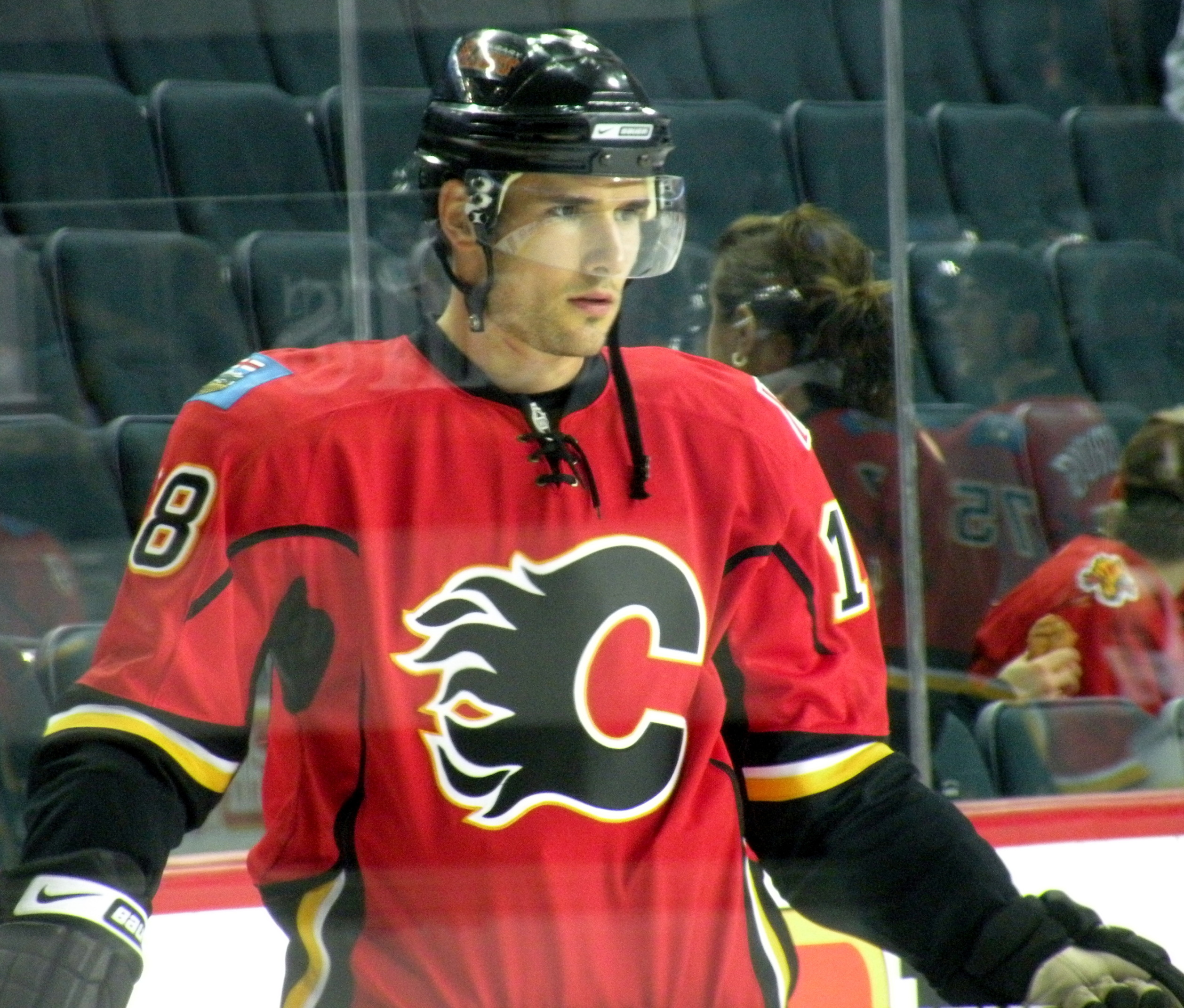
Matthew Lombardi was a member of the Flames since his NHL debut in 2003 until traded to Phoenix in 2009.

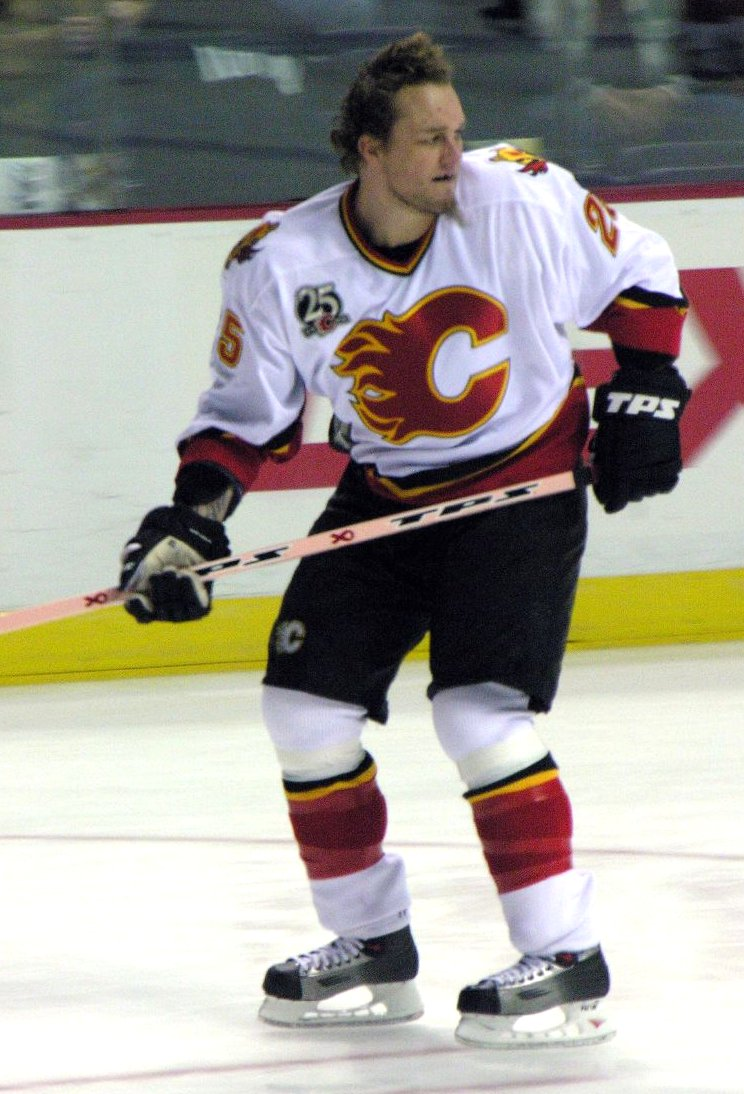
A Flame for two seasons, Darren McCarty came to Calgary in 2005 as a free agent after spending eleven seasons with the Detroit Red Wings.

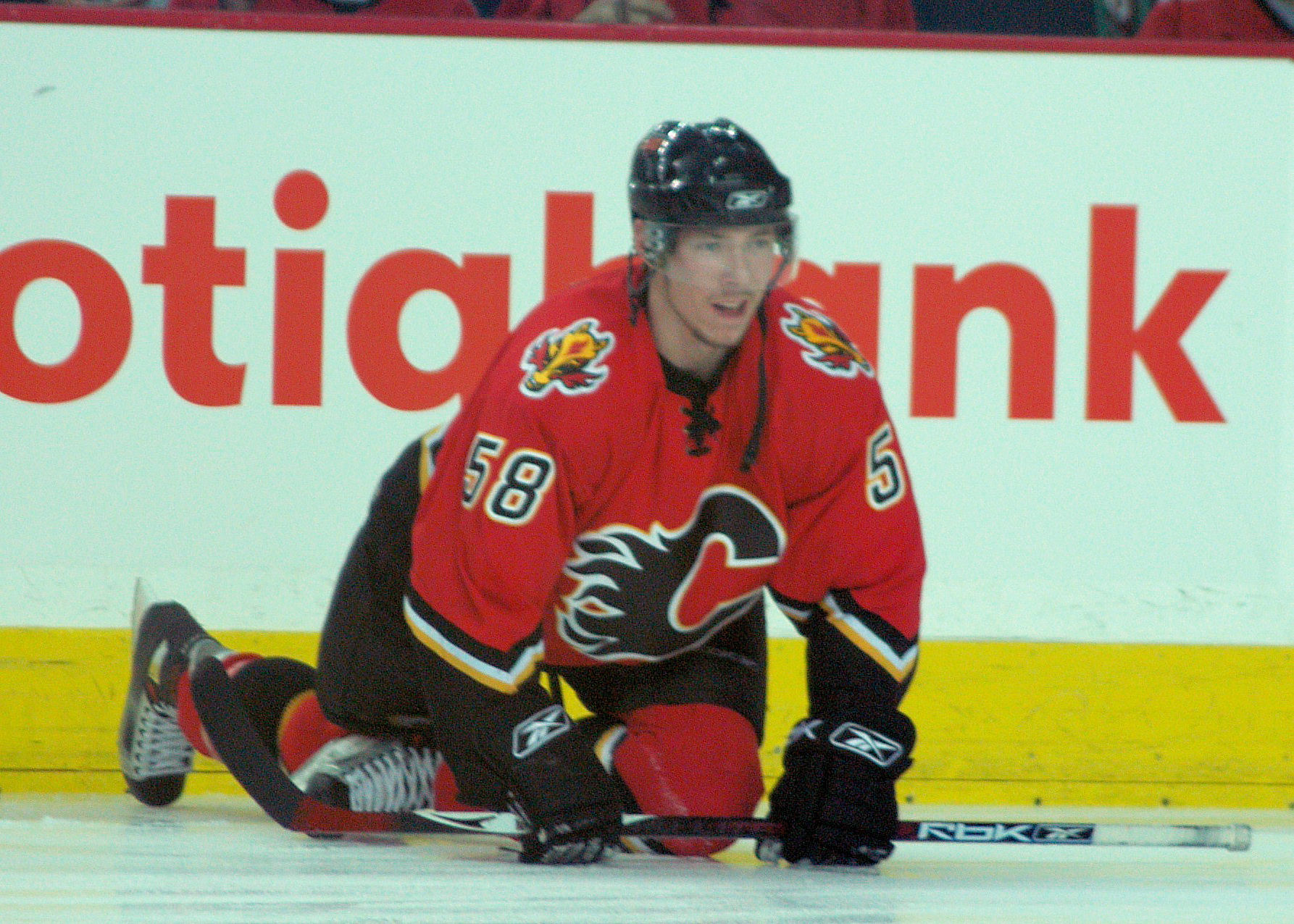
David Moss scored ten goals in 41 games as a rookie in 2006–07.

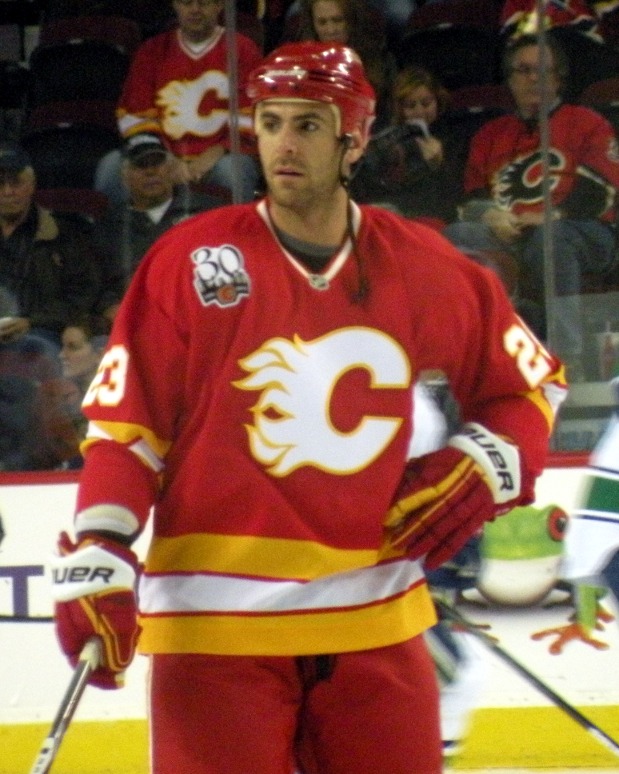
Eric Nystrom was the Flames first round draft pick in 2002.

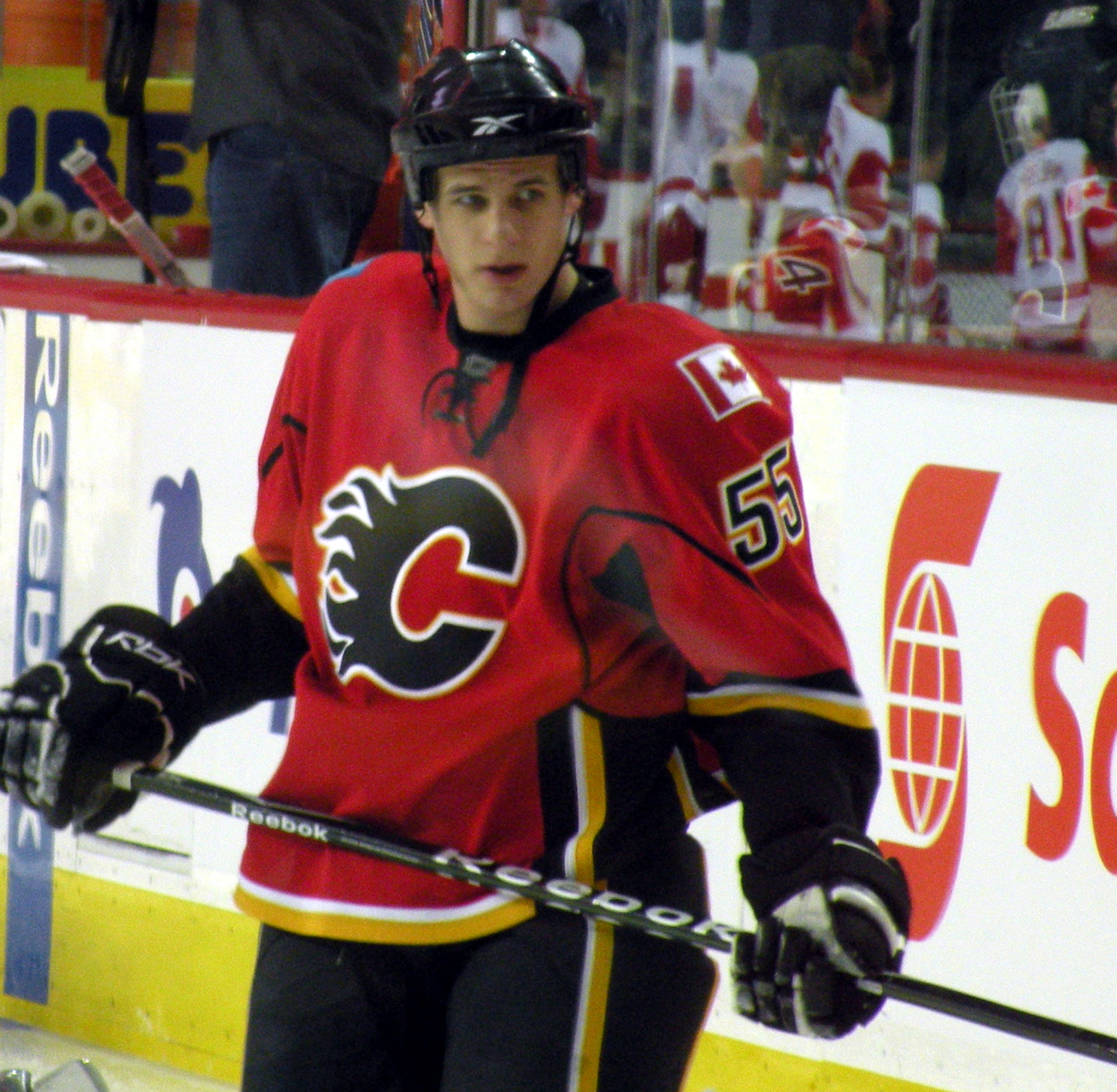
Adam Pardy made his NHL debut in 2008.

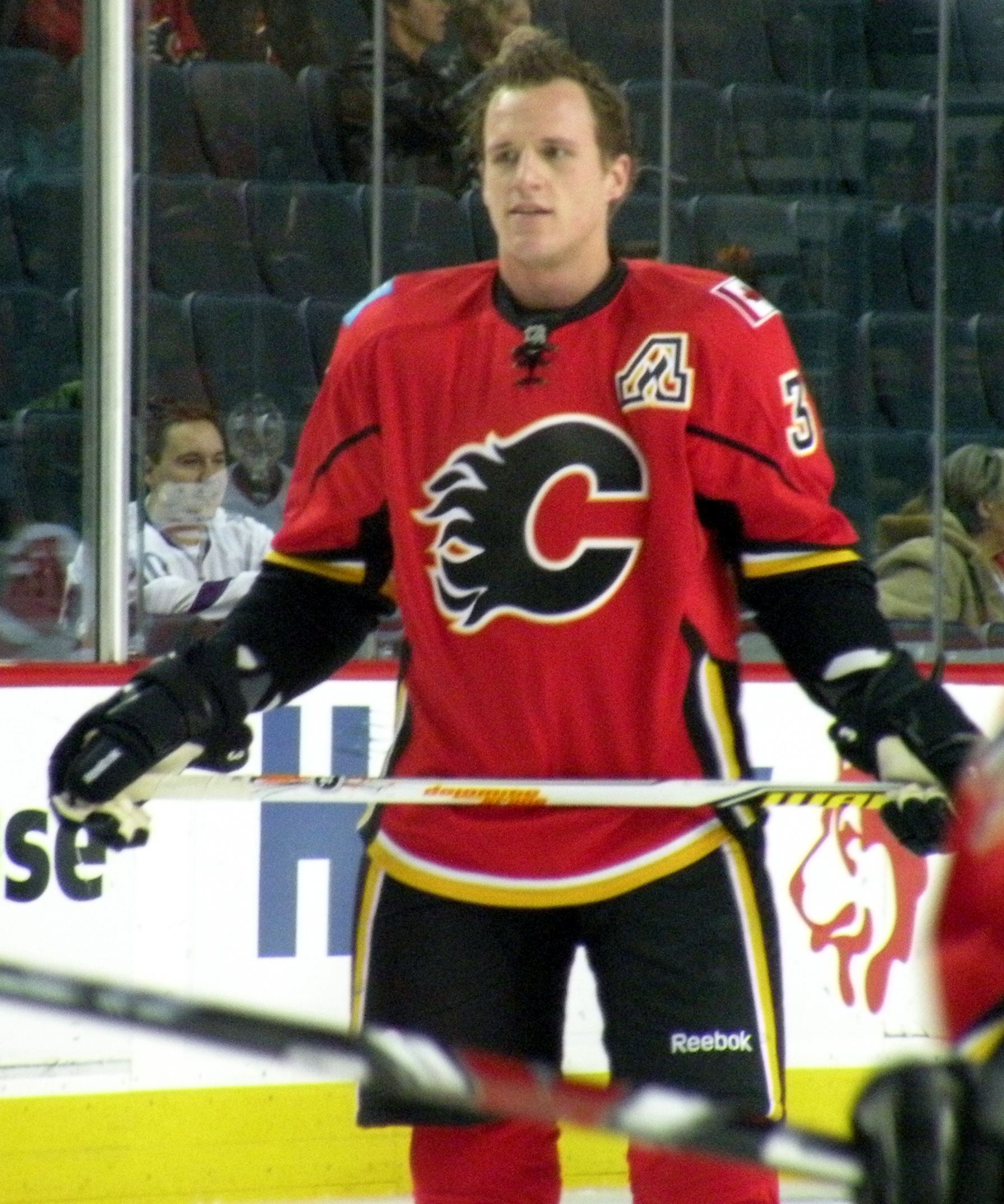
Dion Phaneuf, seen warming up before a game, set a Flames rookie defensive scoring record, recording 20 goals in 2005–06.

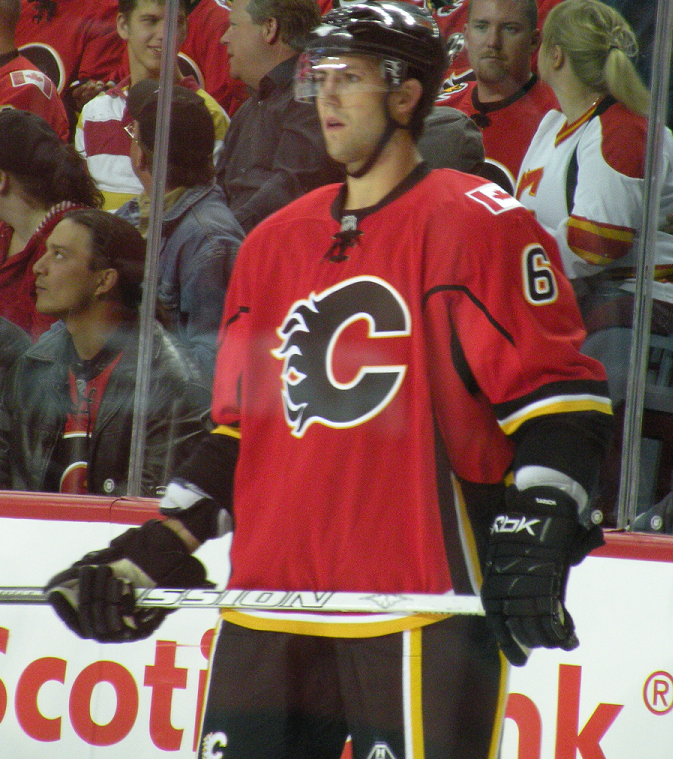
Cory Sarich joined the Flames in 2007.

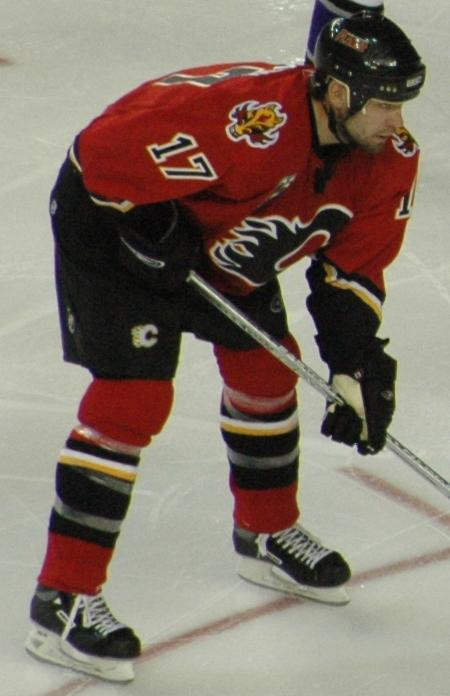
Chris Simon joined the Flames in time to help Calgary reach the 2004 Stanley Cup Final.

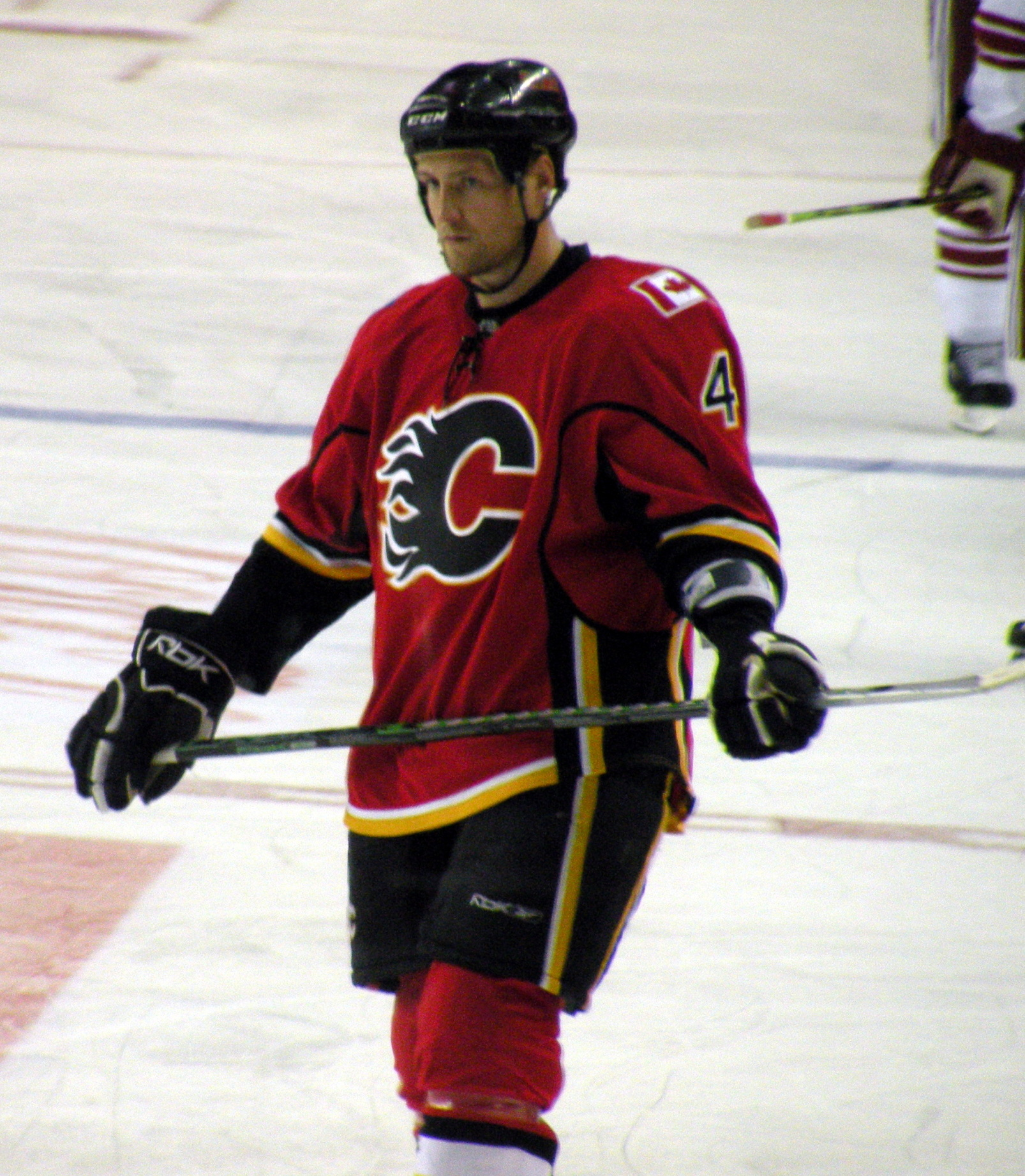
Jim Vandermeer played parts of two seasons with the Flames between 2008 and 2009.

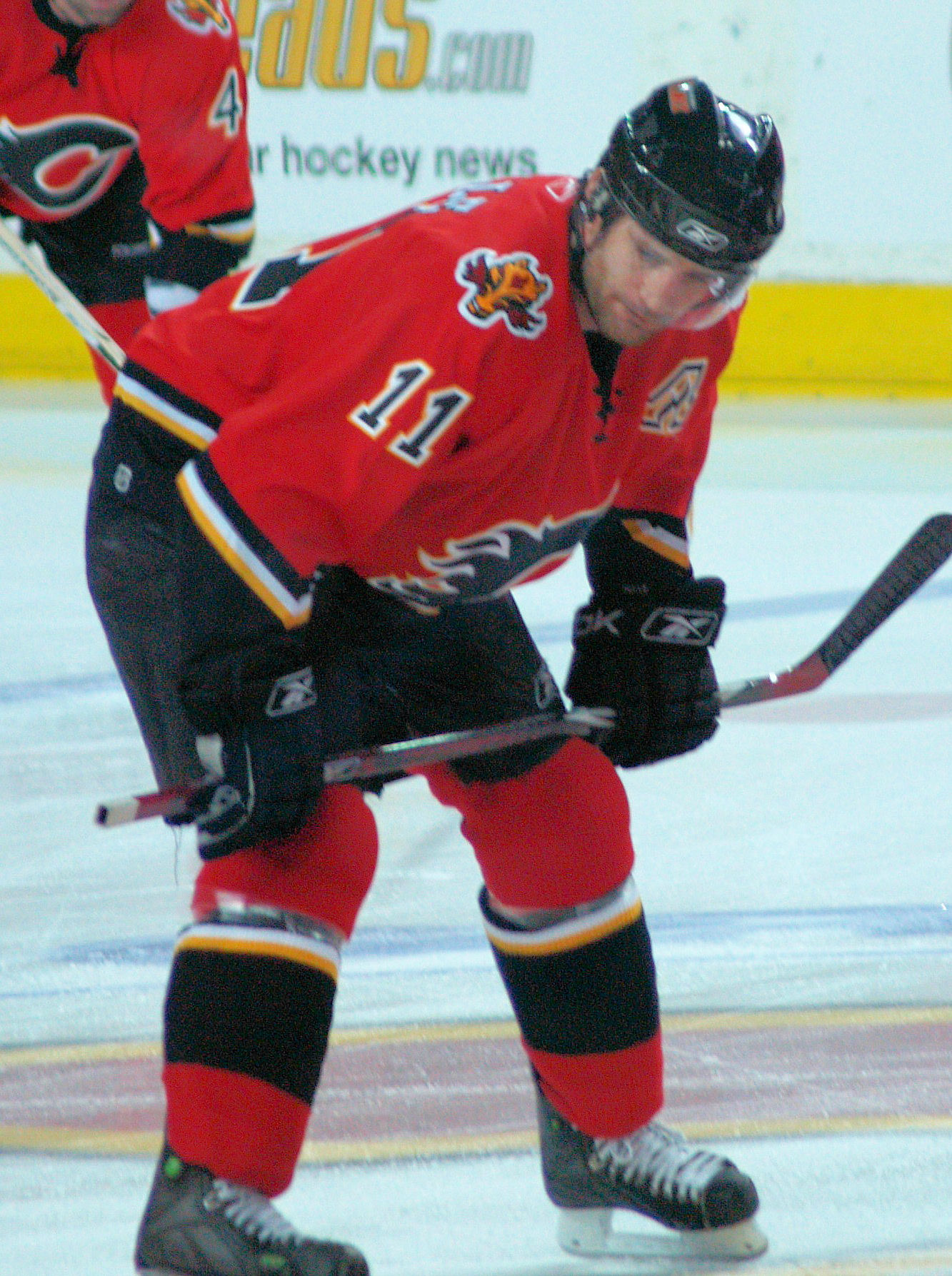
Stephane Yelle was a key member of the Flames between 2002 and 2008.

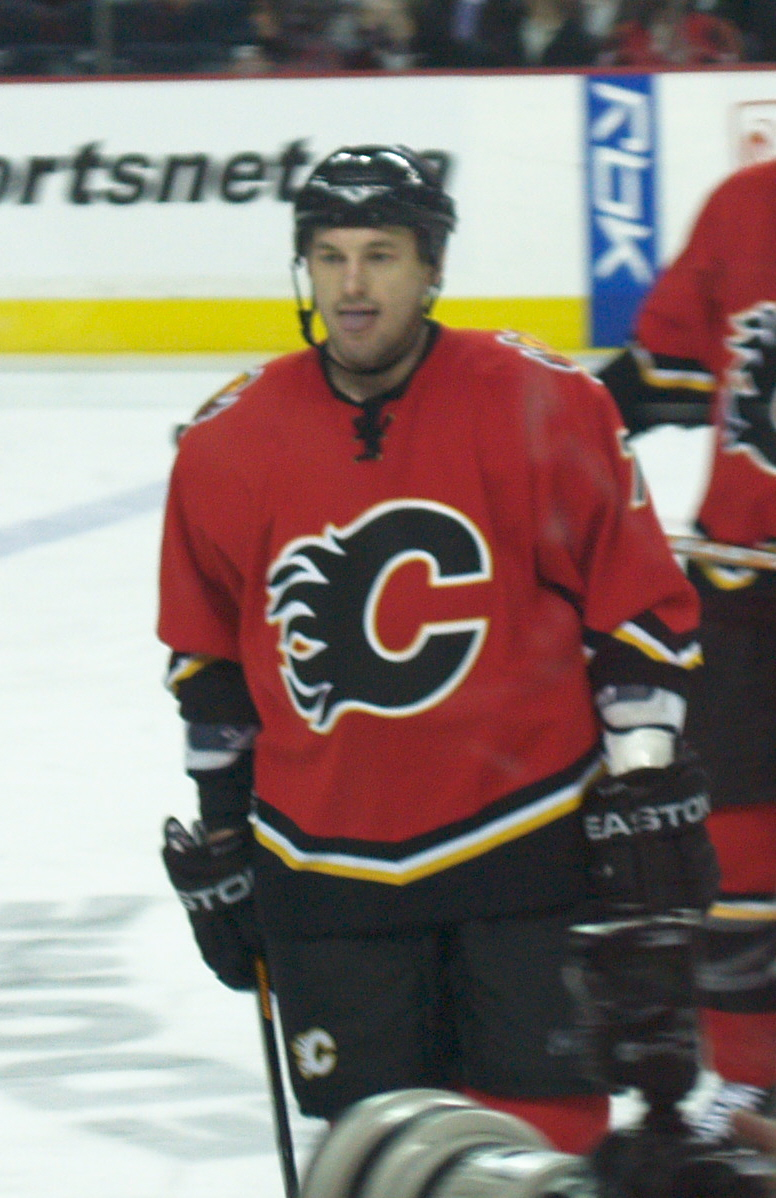
Andrei Zyuzin spent the 2006–07 season in Calgary.

	Nat	Pos	Seasons	Regular season					Playoffs					Notes
	Nat	Pos	Seasons	GP	G	A	P	PIM	GP	G	A	P	PIM	Notes
Agostino, Kenny	United States	F	2013–2016	10	1	1	2	0	—	—	—	—	—	
Ahola, Peter	Finland	D	1993–1994	2	0	0	0	0	—	—	—	—	—	
Albelin, Tommy	Sweden	D	1995–2001	339	12	59	71	92	4	0	0	0	0	
Aliu, Akim	Canada	C	2011–2013	7	2	1	3	26	—	—	—	—	—	
Allison, Jamie	Canada	D	2001–2002	101	3	10	13	163	—	—	—	—	—	
Amonte, Tony	United States	RW	2005–2007	161	24	48	72	83	13	2	2	4	10	
Andersson, Erik	Sweden	LW	1997–1998	12	2	1	3	8	—	—	—	—	—	
Andersson, Niklas	Sweden	LW	2000–2001	11	0	1	1	4	—	—	—	—	—	
Andersson, Rasmus	Sweden	D	2016–2026	584	57	204	261	332	27	7	7	14	31	
Arnold, Bill	United States	F	2013–2016	1	0	0	0	0	—	—	—	—	—	
Ashton, Brent	Canada	F	1992–1993	32	8	11	19	41	6	0	3	3	2	
Aucoin, Adrian	Canada	D	2007–2009	157	20	49	69	83	13	2	4	6	6	
Babchuk, Anton	Russia	D	2010–2013	104	10	28	38	30	—	—	—	—	—	
Backlund, Mikael	Sweden	LW	2008–2026	1148	232	374	606	503	42	12	10	22	32	
Bahl, Kevin	Canada	D	2024–2026	149	7	31	38	82	—	—	—	—	—	
Bancks, Carter	Canada	LW	2012–2014	2	0	0	0	0	—	—	—	—	—	
Barrie, Tyson	Canada	D	2024–2025	13	1	2	3	4	—	—	—	—	—	
Bartell, Robin	Canada	D	1985–1986	1	0	0	0	0	6	0	0	0	16	
Bartkowski, Matt	Canada	D	2016–2018	42	1	4	5	30	—	—	—	—	—	
Baertschi, Sven	Switzerland	LW	2011–2015	66	8	20	28	22	—	—	—	—	—	
Bassen, Bob	Canada	C	1998–1999	41	1	2	3	35	—	—	—	—	—	
Baxter, Paul	Canada	D	1983–1987	209	16	39	55	568	30	0	4	4	120	
Bean, Jake	Canada	D	2024–2026	80	3	6	9	24	—	—	—	—	—	
Beecher, John	United States	C	2025–2026	29	2	4	6	31	—	—	—	—	—	
Beers, Eddy	Canada	F	1981–1986	226	87	105	192	232	22	4	6	10	39	
Begin, Steve	Canada	C	1997–1998; 1999–2003; 2012–2013	159	15	11	26	214	—	—	—	—	—	
Belak, Wade	Canada	D	1998–2001	72	0	3	3	218	—	—	—	—	—	
Bennett, Sam	Canada	C	2014–2021	402	67	73	140	319	30	11	8	19	38	
Berezan, Perry	Canada	C	1984–1989	152	31	42	73	154	20	2	5	7	30	
Bergqvist, Jonas	Sweden	RW	1989–1990	22	2	5	7	10	—	—	—	—	—	
Bertuzzi, Todd	Canada	LW	2008–2009	66	15	29	44	74	6	1	1	2	8	
Berube, Craig	Canada	RW	2001–2003	234	10	17	27	628	—	—	—	—	—	
Betts, Blair	Canada	C	2001–2004	35	3	5	8	12	—	—	—	—	—	
Billins, Chad	United States	D	2013–2015	10	0	3	3	0	—	—	—	—	—	
Bishop, Clark	Canada	C	2024–2025	6	1	0	1	0	—	—	—	—	—	
Bodak, Bob	Canada	LW	1987–1988	3	0	0	0	22	—	—	—	—	—	
Bolduc, Dan	United States	LW	1983–1984	2	0	1	1	0	1	0	0	0	0	
Bollig, Brandon	United States	LW	2014–2017	116	3	6	9	191	11	2	0	2	38	
Borschevsky, Nikolai	Russia	RW	1994–1995	8	0	5	5	7	—	—	—	—	—	
Botterill, Jason	Canada	LW	1999–2000; 2001–2002	6	1	0	1	2	—	—	—	—	—	
Bouchard, Joel	Canada	D	1994–1998	126	9	12	21	106	—	—	—	—	—	
Boughner, Bob	Canada	D	2001–2003	148	5	18	23	293	—	—	—	—	—	Captain 2002
Bouma, Lance	Canada	C	2010–2017	304	27	40	67	174	5	0	0	0	4	
Bourgeois, Charlie	Canada	D	1981–1986	162	12	34	46	430	15	0	1	1	51	
Bourque, Rene	Canada	LW	2008–2012	249	88	66	154	211	5	1	0	1	22	
Bouwmeester, Jay	Canada	D	2009–2013	259	18	79	97	132	—	—	—	—	—	
Boyd, Dustin	Canada	C	2006–2010	192	28	29	57	35	5	1	0	1	0	
Bozek, Steve	Canada	F	1983–1988	261	64	79	143	80	31	7	7	14	53	
Bradley, Brian	Canada	C	1985–1988	45	10	19	29	16	1	0	0	0	0	
Breen, Chris	Canada	D	2013–2014	9	0	2	2	5	—	—	—	—	—	
Bridgman, Mel	Canada	C	1981–1983	142	45	80	125	197	12	5	4	9	47	
Brigley, Travis	Canada	LW	1997–2000	19	0	2	2	6	—	—	—	—	—	
Brodie, T. J.	Canada	D	2010–2020	634	48	218	266	194	30	4	11	15	14	
Brouwer, Troy	Canada	RW	2016–2018	150	19	28	47	84	4	0	2	2	0	
Brubaker, Jeff	United States	LW	1983–1984	4	0	0	0	19	—	—	—	—	—	
Brzustewicz, Hunter	United States	D	2024–2026	35	2	5	7	6	—	—	—	—	—	
Bucyk, Randy	Canada	C	1987–1988	2	0	0	0	0	—	—	—	—	—	
Bullard, Mike	Canada	F	1986–1988	136	76	81	157	102	12	4	5	9	8	
Bure, Valeri	Russia	RW	1997–2001	256	93	99	192	100	—	—	—	—	—	
Bureau, Marc	Canada	C	1989–1991; 1999–2000	19	1	3	4	8	—	—	—	—	—	
Butler, Chris	United States	D	2011–2014	194	5	34	39	92	—	—	—	—	—	
Buzek, Petr	Czech Republic	D	2001–2003	76	4	8	12	28	—	—	—	—	—	
Byron, Paul	Canada	C	2011–2015	130	16	30	46	39	—	—	—	—	—	
Cammalleri, Mike	Canada	C	2008–2009; 2011–2014	216	89	89	178	117	6	1	2	3	2	
Carpenter, Ryan	United States	C	2021–2022	8	0	1	1	0	—	—	—	—	—	
Carson, Brett	Canada	D	2010–2013	18	0	1	1	0	—	—	—	—	—	
Cassels, Andrew	Canada	C	1997–1999	151	29	52	81	50	—	—	—	—	—	
Cavallini, Gino	Canada	LW	1984–1986	54	13	17	30	40	3	0	0	0	4	
Cervenka, Roman	Czech Republic	LW	2012–2013	39	9	8	17	14	—	—	—	—	—	
Charron, Eric	Canada	D	1997–2000	35	0	1	1	55	—	—	—	—	—	
Chernomaz, Rich	Canada	RW	1987–1989; 1991–1992	14	1	0	1	6	—	—	—	—	—	
Chiasson, Steve	Canada	D	1994–1997	168	15	59	74	133	11	3	3	6	9	
Chorske, Tom	United States	LW	1998–1999	7	0	0	0	2	—	—	—	—	—	
Chouinard, Guy	Canada	F	1980–1983	196	67	168	235	54	28	4	21	25	8	
Chiasson, Alex	Canada	RW	2016–2017	81	12	12	24	46	4	0	0	0	2	
Christie, Ryan	Canada	LW	2001–2002	2	0	0	0	0	—	—	—	—	—	
Christoff, Steve	United States	C	1982–1983	45	9	8	17	4	1	0	0	0	0	
Chucko, Kris	Canada	RW	2008–2009	2	0	0	0	2	—	—	—	—	—	
Churla, Shane	Canada	RW	1987–1989	34	1	5	6	158	7	0	1	1	17	
Clark, Chris	United States	RW	1999–2004	278	35	36	71	363	26	3	3	6	30	
Clement, Bill	Canada	C	1980–1982	147	16	32	48	61	19	2	1	3	8	
Colborne, Joe	Canada	C	2013–2016	217	37	63	100	104	11	1	2	3	20	
Coleman, Blake	United States	C	2021–2026	392	99	100	199	275	12	2	3	5	12	
Comeau, Blake	Canada	RW	2011–2013	91	9	13	22	38	—	—	—	—	—	
Commodore, Mike	Canada	D	2002–2004	18	0	1	1	44	20	0	2	2	19	
Conacher, Pat	Canada	LW	1995–1996	7	0	0	0	0	—	—	—	—	—	
Conroy, Craig	United States	C	2000–2004; 2006–2011	507	97	211	308	251	45	7	15	22	28	Captain 2002–2003
Corbet, Rene	Canada	LW	1998–2000	68	9	14	23	70	—	—	—	—	—	
Coronato, Matthew	United States	RW	2022–2026	192	45	56	101	63	—	—	—	—	—	
Courteau, Yves	Canada	RW	1984–1985	18	2	5	7	4	1	0	0	0	0	
Cowan, Jeff	Canada	LW	1999–2002	83	14	5	19	130	—	—	—	—	—	
Coxe, Craig	United States	C	1987–1988	7	2	3	5	32	2	1	0	1	16	
Cundari, Mark	Canada	D	2012–2015	8	1	2	3	2	—	—	—	—	—	
Curtale, Tony	United States	D	1980–1981	2	0	0	0	0	—	—	—	—	—	
Cyr, Denis	Canada	RW	1980–1983	66	14	15	29	13	—	—	—	—	—	
Czarnik, Austin	United States	C	2018–2020	62	8	13	21	8	1	0	0	0	0	
Dahl, Kevin	Canada	D	1992–1996; 1997–1998	179	7	22	29	149	16	0	2	2	2	
Davidson, Brandon	Canada	D	2019–2020	7	0	0	0	0	—	—	—	—	—	
Dawes, Nigel	Canada	LW	2009–2010	66	14	18	32	18	—	—	—	—	—	
Dahlquist, Chris	United States	D	1992–1994	151	4	18	22	118	7	3	1	4	4	
DeGray, Dale	Canada	D	1985–1987	28	6	7	13	29	—	—	—	—	—	
Desbiens, Guillaume	Canada	RW	2011–2012	10	0	0	0	25	—	—	—	—	—	
DeSimone, Nick	Canada	D	2022–2024	38	2	5	7	6	—	—	—	—	—	
Diaz, Raphael	Switzerland	D	2014–2015	56	2	2	4	10	3	0	0	0	0	
Dingman, Chris	Canada	LW	1997–1999	72	3	3	6	166	—	—	—	—	—	
Dollas, Bobby	Canada	D	1999–2000	49	3	7	10	28	—	—	—	—	—	
Dome, Robert	Slovakia	RW	2002–2003	1	0	0	0	0	—	—	—	—	—	
Domenichelli, Hnat	Canada	C	1996–2000	96	20	23	43	31	—	—	—	—	—	
Donovan, Shean	Canada	RW	2002–2006	175	28	37	65	161	31	5	5	10	29	
Dowd, Jim	United States	C	1997–1998	48	6	8	14	12	—	—	—	—	—	
Drury, Chris	United States	LW	2002–2003	80	23	30	53	33	—	—	—	—	—	
Drury, Ted	United States	C	1993–1994	34	5	7	12	26	—	—	—	—	—	
Dube, Dillon	Canada	C	2018–2024	325	57	70	127	105	22	4	2	6	4	
Dubinsky, Steve	Canada	C	1998–2000	84	4	11	15	18	—	—	—	—	—	
Duehr, Walker	United States	F	2021–2025	84	9	10	19	10	—	—	—	—	—	
Dunn, Richie	United States	D	1982–1983	80	3	11	14	47	9	1	1	2	8	
DuPont, Micki	Canada	D	2001–2003	18	1	2	3	6	—	—	—	—	—	
Dwyer, Mike	Canada	LW	1980–1982	9	0	3	3	4	1	1	0	1	0	
Eakin, Bruce	Canada	F	1981–1982; 1983–1985	9	2	1	3	4	—	—	—	—	—	
Eakins, Dallas	United States	D	2000–2002	20	0	1	1	15	—	—	—	—	—	
Eaves, Mike	United States	F	1983–1986	117	28	63	93	30	19	5	5	10	10	
Eisenhut, Neil	Canada	C	1994–1995	3	0	0	0	0	—	—	—	—	—	
Eloranta, Kari	Finland	D	1981–1986	255	12	96	108	149	21	1	7	8	19	
Elson, Turner	Canada	LW	2015–2016	1	0	1	1	0	—	—	—	—	—	
Engblom, Brian	Canada	D	1986–1987	32	0	4	4	28	—	—	—	—	—	
Engelland, Deryk	Canada	D	2014–2017	226	9	30	39	192	15	0	1	1	52	
Eriksson, Anders	Sweden	D	2007–2009	61	1	17	18	36	5	0	1	1	2	
Esau, Len	Canada	D	1993–1995	7	0	3	3	7	—	—	—	—	—	
Evans, Brennan	Canada	D	2003–2004	—	—	—	—	—	2	0	0	0	0	
Evason, Dean	Canada	C	1995–1996	67	7	7	14	38	3	0	1	1	0	
Fantenberg, Oscar	Sweden	D	2018–2019	15	0	1	1	7	3	0	0	0	6	
Farabee, Joel	United States	LW	2024–2026	113	23	21	44	36	—	—	—	—	—	
Fata, Rico	Canada	RW	1998–2001	27	0	1	1	10	—	—	—	—	—	
Featherstone, Glen	Canada	D	1996–1997	13	1	3	4	19	—	—	—	—	—	
Fenton, Paul	United States	F	1990–1991	31	7	12	10	5	0	0	0	2		
Ference, Andrew	Canada	D	2002–2007	224	10	53	63	210	33	0	7	7	37	
Ference, Brad	Canada	D	2006–2007	5	0	0	0	2	—	—	—	—	—	
Ferguson, Craig	United States	C	1995–1996	8	0	0	0	4	—	—	—	—	—	
Ferland, Micheal	Canada	LW	2014–2018	250	42	47	89	135	13	3	2	5	30	
Fleury, Theoren	Canada	RW	1988–1999	791	364	466	830	1339	59	29	33	62	97	SC 1989; Captain 1995–1997
Foo, Spencer	Canada	RW	2017–2018	4	2	0	2	0	—	—	—	—	—	
Forbort, Derek	United States	D	2019–2020	7	0	0	0	0	10	1	1	2	2	
Forslund, Tomas	Sweden	RW	1991–1993	44	5	1	16	12	—	—	—	—	—	
Fotiu, Nick	United States	F	1985–1987	51	5	4	9	166	11	0	1	1	34	
Friesen, Jeff	Canada	LW	2006–2007	72	6	6	12	34	5	0	0	0	2	
Freer, Mark	Canada	C	1993–1994	2	0	0	0	4	—	—	—	—	—	
Froese, Byron	Canada	C	2020–2021	6	1	0	1	2	—	—	—	—	—	
Frolik, Michael	Czech Republic	LW	2015–2020	319	63	82	145	158	9	0	1	1	2	
Frost, Morgan	Canada	C	2024–2026	114	25	30	55	34	—	—	—	—	—	
Gagner, Dave	Canada	C	1996–1997	82	27	33	60	48	—	—	—	—	—	
Galiardi, T. J.	Canada	LW	2013–2014	62	4	13	17	21	—	—	—	—	—	
Gaudreau, Johnny	United States	LW	2013–2022	602	210	399	609	132	42	11	22	33	10	
Gauthier, Denis	Canada	D	1997–2004	384	13	45	58	515	6	0	1	1	4	
Gavey, Aaron	Canada	C	1996–1998	67	9	12	21	58	—	—	—	—	—	
Gawdin, Glenn	Canada	C	2020–2022	9	0	1	1	2	—	—	—	—	—	
Gelinas, Martin	Canada	LW	2002–2004	157	38	49	87	121	26	8	7	15	35	
Germyn, Carsen	Canada	RW	2005–2007	4	0	0	0	0	—	—	—	—	—	
Gilbert, Dennis	United States	D	2022–2024	57	2	9	11	43	—	—	—	—	—	
Gilmour, Doug	Canada	C	1988–1992	266	81	214	295	286	35	15	13	28	28	SC 1989
Giordano, Mark	Canada	D	2005–2007; 2008–2021	949	143	366	509	759	23	1	6	7	14	
Glass, Tanner	Canada	LW	2017–2018	16	0	0	0	19	—	—	—	—	—	
Glencross, Curtis	Canada	LW	2008–2015	418	114	128	242	232	6	0	3	3	12	
Glynn, Brian	Canada	D	1987–1990	68	5	14	19	87	1	0	0	0	0	
Godard, Eric	Canada	D	2006–2008	93	1	2	3	221	5	0	0	0	2	
Godynyuk, Alexander	Soviet Union; Ukraine	D	1991–1993	33	3	5	8	23	—	—	—	—	—	
Gould, Bobby	Canada	F	1980–1982	19	3	0	3	4	11	3	1	4	4	
Granlund, Markus	Finland	C	2013–2016	86	14	14	28	24	3	0	1	1	0	
Grant, Derek	Canada	C	2015–2016	15	0	1	1	2	—	—	—	—	—	
Gratton, Benoit	Canada	C	1999–2001	24	1	5	6	24	—	—	—	—	—	
Green, Josh	Canada	F	2003–2004	36	2	4	6	24	—	—	—	—	—	
Greentree, Kyle	Canada	LW	2008–2009	2	0	0	0	0	—	—	—	—	—	
Greer, A. J.	Canada	LW	2023–2024	59	6	6	12	35	—	—	—	—	—	
Greig, Mark	Canada	RW	1994–1995	8	1	1	2	2	—	—	—	—	—	
Gridin, Matvei	Russia	F	2025–2026	37	6	14	20	2	—	—	—	—	—	
Grimson, Stu	Canada	LW	1988–1990	4	0	0	0	22	—	—	—	—	—	
Gross, Tyson	Canada	F	2025–2026	6	1	0	1	2	—	—	—	—	—	
Grossmann, Nicklas	Sweden	D	2016–2017	3	0	0	0	2	—	—	—	—	—	
Gudbranson, Erik	Canada	D	2021–2022	78	6	11	17	68	12	0	1	1	0	
Gustafsson, Erik	Sweden	D	2019–2020	7	0	3	3	2	10	0	4	4	2	
Guy, Kevan	Canada	D	1986–1988; 1990–1992	42	0	7	7	33	4	0	1	1	23	
Haas, David	Canada	LW	1993–1994	2	1	1	2	7	—	—	—	—	—	
Habscheid, Marc	Canada	F	1991–1992	46	7	11	18	42	—	—	—	—	—	
Hagman, Niklas	Finland	LW	2009–2012	106	17	25	42	28	—	—	—	—	—	
Hale, David	United States	D	2006–2008	69	0	2	2	56	8	0	0	0	8	
Hamilton, Dougie	Canada	D	2015–2018	245	42	95	137	174	4	0	1	1	8	
Hamilton, Freddie	Canada	C	2015–2018	38	3	2	5	10	1	0	0	0	0	
Hampson, Gord	Canada	F	1982–1983	4	0	0	0	5	—	—	—	—	—	
Hamonic, Travis	Canada	D	2017–2020	193	11	31	42	139	5	0	0	0	2	
Hamrlik, Roman	Czech Republic	D	2005–2007	126	14	50	64	144	13	0	3	3	10	
Hanifin, Noah	United States	D	2018–2024	420	42	149	191	116	27	0	8	8	8	
Hanley, Joel	Canada	D	2023–2026	131	3	15	18	72	—	—	—	—	—	
Hannan, Scott	Canada	D	2011–2012	78	2	10	12	38	—	—	—	—	—	
Hanowski, Ben	United States	RW	2012–2015	16	1	2	3	2	—	—	—	—	—	
Hanson, Keith	United States	D	1983–1984	25	0	2	2	77	—	—	—	—	—	
Harkins, Todd	United States	C	1991–1993	20	2	3	5	29	—	—	—	—	—	
Harrer, Tim	United States	RW	1982–1983	3	0	0	0	2	—	—	—	—	—	
Hathaway, Garnet	United States	RW	2015–2019	175	16	24	40	219	5	0	0	0	14	
Hay, Dwayne	Canada	LW	2000–2001	49	1	3	4	16	—	—	—	—	—	
Heaphy, Shawn	Canada	C	1992–1993	1	0	0	0	0	—	—	—	—	—	
Helenius, Sami	Finland	D	1996–1999	7	0	1	1	8	—	—	—	—	—	
Hentunen, Jukka	Finland	RW	2001–2002	28	2	3	5	4	—	—	—	—	—	
Higgins, Chris	Canada	LW	2009–2010	12	2	1	3	0	—	—	—	—	—	
Hindmarch, Dave	Canada	F	1980–1985	98	21	17	38	25	10	0	0	0	6	
Hislop, Jamie	Canada	F	1980–1984	215	37	61	98	65	28	3	2	5	11	
Hlushko, Todd	Canada	LW	1994–1998	76	7	13	20	84	1	0	0	0	2	
Hoglund, Jonas	Sweden	LW	1996–1998	118	25	24	49	28	—	—	—	—	—	
Holt, Randy	Canada	D	1980–1982	56	0	5	5	274	13	2	2	4	52	
Honzek, Samuel	Slovakia	LW	2024–2026	23	2	2	4	4	—	—	—	—	—	
Horak, Roman	Czech Republic	C	2011–2014	82	5	13	18	16	—	—	—	—	—	
Housley, Phil	United States	D	1994–1996; 1998–2001	328	50	188	238	140	7	0	9	9	0	
Houston, Ken	Canada	D	1980–1982	112	37	37	74	184	19	8	8	16	32	
Hrdina, Jiri	Czechoslovakia	C	1987–1991	157	36	58	94	63	11	0	1	1	2	SC 1989
Hrivik, Marek	Slovakia	LW	2017–2018	3	0	0	0	0	—	—	—	—	—	
Huberdeau, Jonathan	Canada	LW	2022–2026	291	65	129	194	160	—	—	—	—	—	
Hudler, Jiri	Czech Republic	RW	2012–2016	248	68	124	192	69	11	4	4	8	2	
Hunt, Dryden	Canada	LW	2023–2026	36	3	8	11	9	—	—	—	—	—	
Hull, Brett	United States	RW	1985–1988	57	27	24	51	12	6	2	1	3	0	HHOF 2009
Hulse, Cale	Canada	D	1995–2000; 2005–2006	277	10	43	53	449	1	0	0	0	0	
Hunter, Mark	Canada	F	1988–1991	133	34	26	60	358	10	2	2	4	23	SC 1989
Hunter, Tim	Canada	F	1981–1992	545	49	59	108	2405	86	5	6	11	352	SC 1989
Huscroft, Jamie	Canada	D	1995–1997	109	3	13	16	179	4	0	1	1	4	
Huselius, Kristian	Sweden	RW	2005–2008	216	74	108	182	102	20	2	10	12	14	
Iginla, Jarome	Canada	RW	1995–2013	1219	525	570	1095	831	54	28	21	49	70	Captain 2003–2013
Ingarfield, Earl Jr.	United States	C	1980–1981	16	2	3	5	6	—	—	—	—	—	
Ivanans, Raitis	Latvia	LW	2010–2012	2	0	0	0	5	—	—	—	—	—	
Jackman, Tim	Canada	RW	2010–2014	209	13	23	36	297	—	—	—	—	—	
Jackson, Jim	Canada	RW	1982–1985	107	15	30	45	20	14	3	2	5	6	
Jaffray, Jason	Canada	RW	2009–2010	3	0	0	0	0	—	—	—	—	—	
Jagr, Jaromir	Czech Republic	RW	2017–2018	22	1	6	7	10	—	—	—	—	—	
Jalonen, Kari	Finland	C	1982–1984	34	9	6	15	4	5	1	0	1	0	
Jankowski, Mark	Canada	C	2016–2020	208	36	28	64	59	10	0	0	0	0	
Jantunen, Marko	Finland	RW	1996–1997	3	0	0	0	0	—	—	—	—	—	
Jarnkrok, Calle	Sweden	C	2021–2022	17	0	4	4	4	12	1	2	3	0	
Johansson, Andreas	Sweden	C	1999–2000	28	3	7	10	14	—	—	—	—	—	
Johansson, Mathias	Sweden	LW	2002–2003	46	4	5	9	12	—	—	—	—	—	
Johansson, Roger	Sweden	D	1989–1991; 1992–1993	150	8	34	42	157	5	0	1	1	2	
Johnson, Aaron	Canada	D	2009–2010	22	1	2	3	19	—	—	—	—	—	
Johnson, Terry	Canada	D	1985–1986	24	1	4	5	71	17	0	3	3	64	
Jokinen, Olli	Finland	C	2008–2012	236	59	108	167	116	6	2	3	5	4	
Jokipakka, Jyrki	Finland	D	2015–2017	56	1	11	12	20	—	—	—	—	—	
Jones, Blair	Canada	C	2011–2014	50	3	4	7	39	—	—	—	—	—	
Jones, David	Canada	RW	2013–2016	174	32	30	62	38	11	2	3	5	2	
Jooris, Josh	Canada	C	2014–2016	119	16	21	37	55	9	0	0	0	4	
Kadri, Nazem	Canada	C	2022–2026	307	100	139	239	195	—	—	—	—	—	
Keczmer, Dan	United States	D	1993–1996	98	3	23	26	72	10	0	1	1	6	
Kennedy, Sheldon	Canada	RW	1994–1996	71	10	15	25	81	10	2	3	5	18	
Kerins, Rory	Canada	C	2024–2026	9	0	4	4	2	—	—	—	—	—	
Kirkland, Justin	Canada	LW	2024–2026	41	3	7	10	13	—	—	—	—	—	
Kisio, Kelly	Canada	F	1993–1995	63	14	27	41	34	14	3	4	7	27	
Klapka, Adam	Czech Republic	F	2023–2026	116	13	16	29	160	—	—	—	—	—	
Klimchuk, Morgan	Canada	LW	2017–2018	1	0	0	0	0	—	—	—	—	—	
Knight, Corban	Canada	C	2013–2014	7	1	0	1	0	—	—	—	—	—	
Kobasew, Chuck	Canada	RW	2002–2007	210	34	37	71	160	33	1	1	1	24	
Kohn, Ladislav	Czech Republic	RW	1995–1998; 2002–2003	12	1	2	3	4	—	—	—	—	—	
Kolanos, Krys	Canada	C	2011–2012	13	0	1	1	2	—	—	—	—	—	
Konroyd, Steve	Canada	D	1980–1986; 1994–1995	350	18	83	101	386	24	4	7	1	40	
Korn, Jim	United States	D	1989–1990	9	0	2	2	26	4	1	0	1	12	
Kostopoulos, Tom	Canada	RW	2010–2012	140	11	15	26	101	—	—	—	—	—	
Kotalik, Ales	Czech Republic	RW	2009–2011	52	7	4	11	37	—	—	—	—	—	
Kravchuk, Igor	Russia	D	2000–2002	115	4	30	34	23	—	—	—	—	—	
Krivokrasov, Sergei	Russia	RW	1999–2000	12	1	10	11	4	—	—	—	—	—	
Kromm, Richard	Canada	LW	1983–1986	189	43	61	104	90	14	1	2	3	13	
Kronwall, Staffan	Sweden	D	2009–2010	11	1	2	3	2	—	—	—	—	—	
Kruse, Paul	Canada	LW	1990–1997	246	24	29	53	614	17	2	4	6	28	
Kulak, Brett	Canada	D	2014–2018	101	2	9	11	41	—	—	—	—	—	
Kuzmenko, Andrei	Russia	F	2023–2025	66	18	22	40	18	—	—	—	—	—	
Kuznetsov, Yan	Russia	D	2023–2026	58	4	8	12	28	—	—	—	—	—	
Kylington, Oliver	Sweden	D	2015–2016; 2018–2024	201	17	38	55	52	12	1	2	3	8	
Kyte, Jim	Canada	D	1990–1992	63	0	10	10	260	7	0	0	0	7	
Labraaten, Dan	Sweden	LW	1980–1982	70	19	19	38	19	8	1	0	1	4	
Lakovic, Sasha	Canada	LW	1996–1997	19	0	1	1	54	—	—	—	—	—	
Lalonde, Bobby	Canada	C	1981–1982	1	0	0	0	0	—	—	—	—	—	
Lamb, Mark	Canada	C	1985–1986	1	0	0	0	0	—	—	—	—	—	
Landry, Eric	Canada	C	1997–1999	15	1	1	2	4	—	—	—	—	—	
Langkow, Daymond	Canada	C	2005–2011	392	123	165	288	159	26	6	12	18	12	
Lapointe, Claude	Canada	C	1995–1996	32	4	5	9	20	2	0	0	0	0	
Larose, Guy	Canada	C	1993–1994	7	0	1	1	4	—	—	—	—	—	
LaVallee, Kevin	Canada	F	1980–1983	212	66	65	131	63	19	3	6	9	15	
Lazar, Curtis	Canada	C/RW	2016–2019	70	3	12	15	23	1	0	0	0	0	
Lebeau, Patrick	Canada	LW	1992–1993	1	0	0	0	0	—	—	—	—	—	
Leclerc, Mike	Canada	LW	2005–2006	15	1	4	5	8	3	0	0	0	2	
Leeman, Gary	Canada	RW	1991–1993	59	11	12	23	37	—	—	—	—	—	
Leivo, Josh	Canada	LW	2020–2021	38	6	3	9	10	—	—	—	—	—	
Lemieux, Jocelyn	Canada	LW	1995–1996	20	4	4	8	10	4	0	0	0	0	
Leopold, Jordan	United States	D	2002–2006; 2008–2009	233	16	55	71	110	39	0	12	12	18	
Lessard, Rick	Canada	D	1988–1989; 1990–1991	7	0	2	2	2	—	—	—	—	—	
Letang, Alan	Canada	D	2001–2002	2	0	0	0	0	—	—	—	—	—	
Letourneau-Leblond, Pierre-Luc	Canada	LW	2011–2012	3	0	0	0	10	—	—	—	—	—	
Lever, Don	Canada	F	1980–1982	85	34	42	76	76	16	4	7	11	20	
Lewis, Trevor	United States	C	2021–2023	162	15	21	36	30	12	2	3	5	14	
Lindberg, Chris	Canada	LW	1991–1993	79	11	17	28	35	1	0	1	1	2	
Lindholm, Elias	Sweden	C	2018–2024	418	148	209	357	121	27	8	9	17	12	
Lindsay, Bill	Canada	F	1999–2001	132	9	21	30	183	—	—	—	—	—	
Lombardi, Matthew	Canada	C	2003–2009	347	65	102	167	225	33	2	8	10	10	
Lomberg, Ryan	Canada	LW	2017–2019; 2024–2026	148	7	16	23	148	—	—	—	—	—	
Loob, Hakan	Sweden	F	1983–1989	450	193	236	429	189	73	26	28	54	16	SC 1989
Lowry, Dave	Canada	LW	2000–2004	193	31	38	69	131	10	0	0	0	6	Captain 2000–2002
Loyns, Lynn	Canada	F	2003–2006	13	0	2	2	2	—	—	—	—	—	
Lucic, Milan	Canada	LW	2019–2023	283	35	48	83	227	22	1	6	7	50	
Lundmark, Jamie	Canada	C	2005–2007; 2008–2010	99	16	23	39	72	6	0	1	1	7	
Lydman, Toni	Finland	D	2000–2004	289	19	74	93	140	6	0	1	1	2	
Maatta, Olli	Finland	D	2025–2026	21	2	12	14	2	—	—	—	—	—	
MacDermid, Lane	United States	LW	2013–2014	1	0	0	0	7	—	—	—	—	—	
MacDonald, Craig	Canada	C	2005–2006	25	3	2	5	8	1	0	0	0	0	
MacInnis, Al	Canada	D	1981–1994	803	213	609	822	944	95	25	77	102	153	SC 1989; HHOF 2007
MacLellan, Brian	Canada	F	1988–1991	134	35	35	70	95	28	3	4	7	27	SC 1989
MacMillan, Bob	Canada	C	1980–1982	100	32	42	74	61	16	8	6	14	7	
Mackey, Connor	United States	D	2020–2023	19	3	4	7	31	—	—	—	—	—	
Macoun, Jamie	Canada	D	1982–1992	586	62	184	246	664	84	6	19	25	87	SC 1989
Makarov, Sergei	Soviet Union; Russia	RW	1989–1993	297	94	198	292	199	9	1	6	7	0	
Maki, Tomi	Finland	RW	2006–2007	1	0	0	0	0	—	—	—	—	—	
Malgunas, Stewart	Canada	D	1999–2000	4	0	1	1	2	—	—	—	—	—	
Mangiapane, Andrew	Canada	LW	2017–2024	417	109	106	215	181	27	6	6	12	16	
Mantha, Anthony	Canada	RW	2024–2025	13	4	3	7	11	—	—	—	—	—	
Marchment, Bryan	Canada	D	2005–2006	37	1	2	3	75	—	—	—	—	—	
Markwart, Nevin	Canada	F	1991–1992	10	2	1	3	25	—	—	—	—	—	
Marsh, Brad	Canada	D	1980–1982	97	1	13	14	97	16	0	5	5	8	Captain 1980–1981
Matteau, Stephane	Canada	LW	1990–1992	82	16	19	35	112	5	1	1	0		
May, Alan	Canada	LW	1994–1995	7	1	2	3	13	—	—	—	—	—	
Mayers, Jamal	Canada	RW	2009–2010	27	1	5	6	53	—	—	—	—	—	
McAdam, Gary	Canada	F	1981–1982	46	12	15	27	18	3	0	0	0		
McAmmond, Dean	Canada	LW	2001–2004	137	38	43	81	78	—	—	—	—	—	
McCarthy, Sandy	Canada	RW	1993–1998	276	30	25	55	730	17	0	1	1	61	
McCarty, Darren	Canada	RW	2005–2007	99	7	6	13	175	7	2	0	2	15	
McCrimmon, Brad	Canada	D	1987–1990	231	16	67	83	274	37	2	8	10	60	SC 1989; Captain 1989–1990
McDonald, Lanny	Canada	F	1981–1989	492	215	191	406	408	72	24	23	47	98	SC 1989; Ret #9; HHOF 1992; Co-captain 1983–1989
McGrattan, Brian	Canada	RW	2009–2010; 2012–2015	137	8	7	15	239	—	—	—	—	—	
McInnis, Marty	United States	LW	1996–1999	91	23	30	53	42	—	—	—	—	—	
McKendry, Alex	Canada	F	1980–1981	36	3	6	9	19	—	—	—	—	—	
Mctavish, Dale	Canada	C	1996–1997	9	1	2	3	2	—	—	—	—	—	
Meredith, Greg	Canada	F	1980–1981; 1982–1983	36	6	4	10	8	5	3	1	4	4	
Meyer, Stefan	Canada	LW	2010–2011	16	0	2	2	17	—	—	—	—	—	
Mikkelson, Brendan	Canada	D	2010–2011	19	0	1	1	2	—	—	—	—	—	
Millen, Corey	United States	C	1995–1997	92	15	25	40	42	—	—	—	—	—	
Miller, Brad	Canada	D	1993–1994	8	0	1	1	14	—	—	—	—	—	
Miromanov, Daniil	Russia	D/RW	2023–2026	65	5	11	16	20	—	—	—	—	—	
Modin, Fredrik	Sweden	LW	2010–2011	4	0	0	0	2	—	—	—	—	—	
Mokosak, Carl	Canada	F	1981–1983	42	7	7	14	87	—	—	—	—	—	
Monahan, Sean	Canada	C	2013–2022	656	212	250	462	153	30	10	11	21	4	
Montador, Steve	Canada	D	2001–2006	94	4	5	9	201	20	1	2	3	6	
Morgan, Jason	Canada	C	2003–2004	13	0	2	2	2	—	—	—	—	—	
Morris, Derek	Canada	D	1997–2002	343	34	129	163	385	—	—	—	—	—	
Morrison, Brendan	Canada	C	2010–2012	94	13	41	54	22	—	—	—	—	—	
Morrow, Scott	United States	LW	1994–1995	4	0	0	0	0	—	—	—	—	—	
Morton, Sam	United States	F	2024–2026	4	1	0	1	10	—	—	—	—	—	
Moss, David	United States	RW	2006–2012	317	61	62	123	94	17	4	2	6	4	
Mottau, Mike	United States	D	2002–2003	4	0	0	0	0	—	—	—	—	—	
Mrozik, Rick	United States	D	2002–2003	2	0	0	0	0	—	—	—	—	—	
Mullen, Joe	United States	F	1985–1990	345	190	198	388	95	61	35	20	55	18	SC 1989; HHOF 2000
Murdoch, Bob	Canada	D	1980–1982	147	6	36	42	130	19	1	4	5	36	
Murray, Marty	Canada	C	1995–2001	26	3	3	6	6	—	—	—	—	—	
Murzyn, Dana	Canada	D	1987–1991	201	16	#9	55	404	32	4	5	9	35	SC 1989
Musil, Frank	Czechoslovakia; Czech Republic	D	1990–1995	335	18	45	63	505	25	1	3	4	21	
Nakladal, Jakub	Czech Republic	D	2015–2016	27	2	3	5	6	—	—	—	—	—	
Nattress, Ric	Canada	D	1987–1992	226	9	53	62	204	38	4	6	10	30	
Nazarov, Andrei	Russia	LW	1998–2000	112	15	31	46	108	—	—	—	—	—	
Neal, James	Canada	LW	2018–2019	63	7	12	19	28	4	0	0	0	0	
Negrin, John	Canada	D	2008–2009	3	0	1	1	2	—	—	—	—	—	
Nemisz, Greg	Canada	C	2010–2012	15	0	1	1	0	—	—	—	—	—	
Nesterov, Nikita	Russia	D	2020–2021	38	0	4	4	20	—	—	—	—	—	
Nichol, Scott	Canada	C	2001–2003	128	13	14	27	256	—	—	—	—	—	
Nieckar, Barry	Canada	LW	1994–1995	3	0	0	0	12	—	—	—	—	—	
Niedermayer, Rob	Canada	C	2001–2003	111	14	24	38	91	—	—	—	—	—	
Nieminen, Ville	Finland	LW	2003–2004	19	3	5	8	18	24	4	4	8	55	
Nieuwendyk, Joe	Canada	C	1986–1995	577	314	302	616	330	66	32	28	60	36	SC 1989; Captain 1991–1995
Nilson, Marcus	Sweden	RW	2003–2008	194	19	23	42	77	41	5	9	14	24	
Nilsson, Kent	Sweden	F	1980–1985	345	189	280	469	80	29	4	24	28	6	
Nolan, Owen	Canada	RW	2007–2008	77	16	16	32	71	7	3	2	5	2	
Nordstrom, Joakim	Sweden	C	2020–2021	44	1	6	7	6	—	—	—	—	—	
Norwood, Lee	United States	D	1993–1994	16	0	1	1	16	—	—	—	—	—	
Nylander, Michael	Sweden	C	1993–1996; 1997–1999	168	34	74	108	54	13	0	6	6	2	
Nystrom, Eric	United States	LW	2005–2006; 2007–2010	204	19	20	39	191	13	2	2	4	2	
O'Brien, Shane	Canada	D	2013–2014	45	0	3	3	58	—	—	—	—	—	
Oesterle, Jordan	United States	D	2023–2024	22	0	2	2	4	—	—	—	—	—	
Okhotyuk, Nikita	Russia	D	2023–2024	9	0	1	1	4	—	—	—	—	—	
Oliwa, Krzysztof	Poland	LW	2003–2004	65	3	2	5	247	20	2	0	2	6	
Olofsson, Victor	Sweden	RW	2025–2026	18	2	4	6	0	—	—	—	—	—	
Olsen, Darryl	Canada	D	1991–1992	1	0	0	0	0	—	—	—	—	—	
Osiecki, Mark	United States	D	1991–1992	50	2	7	9	24	—	—	—	—	—	
O'Sullivan, Chris	United States	D	1996–1999	49	2	11	13	14	—	—	—	—	—	
Othmann, Brennan	Canada	LW	2025–2026	2	1	1	2	0	—	—	—	—	—	
Otto, Joel	United States	C	1984–1995	730	167	261	428	1642	87	23	38	61	188	SC 1989
Pachal, Brayden	Canada	D	2023–2026	148	5	20	25	174	—	—	—	—	—	
Pankewicz, Greg	Canada	F	1998–1999	17	0	3	3	20	—	—	—	—	—	
Pardy, Adam	Canada	D	2008–2011	147	4	22	26	139	6	0	2	2	5	
Parekh, Zayne	Canada	D	2024–2026	38	5	5	10	10	—	—	—	—	—	
Paslawski, Greg	Canada	RW	1992–1994	28	6	5	11	2	6	3	0	3	0	
Patrick, James	Canada	D	1993–1998	217	14	56	70	82	16	0	2	2	8	
Patterson, Colin	Canada	F	1983–1991	416	88	99	187	187	72	11	16	27	55	SC 1989
Pelech, Matt	Canada	LW	2008–2009	5	0	3	3	0	—	—	—	—	—	
Pelletier, Jakob	Canada	LW	2022–2025	61	8	13	21	10	—	—	—	—	—	
Peluso, Anthony	United States	RW	2018–2019	4	0	0	0	7	—	—	—	—	—	
Peluso, Mike	United States	D	1997–1998	23	0	0	0	113	—	—	—	—	—	
Peplinski, Jim	Canada	F	1980–1990; 1994–1995	711	161	263	424	1467	99	15	31	46	382	SC 1989; Co-captain 1984–1989
Peters, Warren	Canada	F	2008–2009	16	1	0	1	12	4	0	0	0	0	
Petit, Michel	Canada	D	1991–1994	134	8	40	48	243	—	—	—	—	—	
Petrovicky, Ronald	Slovakia	RW	2000–2002	107	9	12	21	139	—	—	—	—	—	
Phaneuf, Dion	Canada	D	2005–2010	378	79	152	228	522	25	5	7	12	22	
Phillips, Matthew	Canada	F	2020–2023	3	0	0	0	2	—	—	—	—	—	
Pitlick, Tyler	United States	C	2021–2022	25	0	2	2	2	—	—	—	—	—	
Piskula, Joe	United States	D	2011–2012	6	0	1	1	0	—	—	—	—	—	
Poirier, Emile	Canada	RW	2014–2017	7	0	0	0	4	—	—	—	—	—	
Pospisil, Martin	Slovakia	C	2023–2026	166	13	39	52	210	—	—	—	—	—	
Potter, Corey	United States	D	2014–2015	6	0	0	0	0	2	0	0	0	0	
Plett, Willi	Canada	F	1980–1982	156	59	66	125	125	18	9	6	15	128	
Primeau, Wayne	Canada	C	2006–2009	94	6	15	21	76	13	1	2	3	18	
Prust, Brandon	Canada	LW	2006–2007; 2008–2010	77	2	5	7	202	—	—	—	—	—	
Pryakhin, Sergei	Soviet Union	RW	1988–1991	46	3	8	11	2	3	0	0	0	0	
Quine, Alan	Canada	C	2018–2020	22	4	2	6	10	3	0	1	1	0	
Quinn, Dan	Canada	C	1983–1987	222	72	119	191	100	29	11	12	23	14	
Racine, Yves	Canada	D	1996–1997	46	1	15	16	24	—	—	—	—	—	
Ramage, John	United States	D	2014–2015	1	0	0	0	0	—	—	—	—	—	
Ramage, Rob	Canada	D	1987–1989	80	4	19	23	193	29	2	14	16	47	SC 1989
Ramholt, Tim	Canada	D	2007–2008	1	0	0	0	0	—	—	—	—	—	
Ranheim, Paul	United States	LW	1988–1994	354	94	100	194	105	19	3	6	9	2	
Rautakallio, Pekka	Finland	D	1980–1982	156	28	96	124	104	19	2	4	6	6	
Raymond, Mason	Canada	LW	2014–2016	86	16	12	28	16	8	0	2	2	0	
Regehr, Richie	Canada	D	2005–2007	20	1	3	4	6	—	—	—	—	—	
Regehr, Robyn	Canada	D	1999–2011	827	29	134	163	802	41	3	12	15	28	
Reichel, Robert	Czechoslovakia; Czech Republic	C	1990–1997	425	153	201	354	217	26	5	14	19	6	
Reierson, Dave	Canada	D	1988–1989	2	0	0	0	2	—	—	—	—	—	
Reinhart, Max	Canada	C	2012–2015	23	1	4	5	6	—	—	—	—	—	
Reinhart, Paul	Canada	D	1980–1988	438	100	297	397	172	76	21	51	72	38	
Reinprecht, Steven	Canada	C	2003–2006	96	17	41	58	28	—	—	—	—	—	
Ribble Pat	Canada	D	1981–1983	31	0	1	1	20	—	—	—	—	—	
Richardson, Brad	Canada	C	2021–2022	27	2	2	4	27	—	—	—	—	—	
Rieder, Tobias	Germany	C	2019–2020	55	4	6	10	6	10	3	2	5	0	
Rinaldo, Zac	Canada	C	2019–2021	23	3	2	5	39	5	0	0	0	4	
Rioux, Pierre	Canada	F	1982–1983	14	1	2	3	4	—	—	—	—	—	
Risebrough, Doug	Canada	F	1982–1987	247	68	101	169	583	50	10	17	27	95	Co-captain 1983–1987
Ritchie, Brett	Canada	RW	2020–2023	107	13	7	20	76	7	2	0	2	4	
Ritchie, Byron	Canada	C	2005–2007	109	12	8	20	137	8	0	0	0	10	
Ritchie, Nick	Canada	LW	2022–2023	16	4	1	5	10	—	—	—	—	—	
Roberts, Gary	Canada	LW	1986–1996	585	257	248	505	1736	58	13	30	43	216	
Robinson, Buddy	United States	RW	2019–2021	14	1	0	1	7	1	0	0	0	0	
Roche, Dave	Canada	LW	1998–2000	38	3	3	6	49	—	—	—	—	—	
Rooney, Kevin	United States	C	2022–2025	120	8	7	15	23	—	—	—	—	—	
Roy, Andre	Canada	RW	2008–2009	44	3	0	3	83	2	0	0	0	0	
Russell, Kris	Canada	D	2013–2016	198	15	63	78	40	11	2	5	7	7	
Russell, Phil	Canada	D	1980–1983	229	23	66	89	326	25	3	12	15	55	Captain 1981–1983
Ruzicka, Adam	Slovakia	C	2020–2024	114	14	26	40	26	—	—	—	—	—	
Ryan, Derek	United States	C	2018–2021	192	25	55	80	50	15	1	2	3	2	
Rychel, Kerby	United States	LW	2018–2019	2	0	0	0	0	—	—	—	—	—	
Sabourin, Ken	Canada	D	1988–1991	27	1	4	5	72	1	0	0	0	0	
Saprykin, Oleg	Russia	LW	1999–2004	187	29	47	76	132	26	3	3	6	14	
Sarault, Yves	Canada	LW	1995–1996	11	2	1	3	4	—	—	—	—	—	
Sarich, Cory	Canada	D	2007–2013	379	10	49	59	462	12	0	2	2	8	
Savard, Marc	Canada	C	1999–2002	221	60	94	154	158	—	—	—	—	—	
Schlegel, Brad	Canada	D	1993–1994	26	1	6	7	4	—	—	—	—	—	
Schlemko, David	Canada	RW	2014–2015	19	0	0	0	8	11	0	1	1	2	
Schulte, Paxton	Canada	LW	1996–1997	1	0	0	0	2	—	—	—	—	—	
Schwindt, Cole	Canada	RW	2023–2024	4	0	0	0	2	—	—	—	—	—	
Scoville, Darrel	Canada	D	1999–2000	6	0	0	0	2	—	—	—	—	—	
Setoguchi, Devin	Canada	RW	2014–2015	12	0	0	0	4	—	—	—	—	—	
Shannon, Darryl	Canada	D	1999–2000	27	1	8	9	22	—	—	—	—	—	
Shantz, Jeff	Canada	C	1998–2002	256	33	53	86	151	—	—	—	—	—	
Sharangovich, Yegor	Belarus	C	2023–2026	233	63	57	120	28	—	—	—	—	—	
Sheehy, Neil	Canada	D	1983–1988; 1991–1992	222	13	34	47	725	32	0	2	2	104	
Shinkaruk, Hunter	Canada	C	2015–2017	14	2	2	4	4	—	—	—	—	—	
Shore, Drew	United States	C	2014–2016	13	1	3	4	2	1	0	0	0	2	
Shore, Nick	United States	C	2017–2018	9	1	2	3	4	—	—	—	—	—	
Sieloff, Patrick	United States	D	2015–2016	1	1	0	1	2	—	—	—	—	—	
Simard, Martin	Canada	LW	1990–1992	37	1	5	6	172	—	—	—	—	—	
Simon, Chris	Canada	LW	2003–2006	85	11	16	27	119	22	5	3	8	81	
Simon, Dominik	Czech Republic	C	2020–2021	11	0	0	0	0	—	—	—	—	—	
Simpson, Todd	Canada	D	1995–1999	214	4	26	30	500	—	—	—	—	—	Captain 1997–1999
Sjostrom, Fredrik	Sweden	F	2009–2010	46	1	5	6	8	—	—	—	—	—	
Skalde, Jarrod	Canada	C	1995–1996	1	0	0	0	0	—	—	—	—	—	
Skrudland, Brian	Canada	C	1992–1993	16	2	4	6	10	6	0	3	3	12	
Sloan, Blake	United States	F	2001–2003	74	2	10	12	32	—	—	—	—	—	
Smid, Ladislav	Czech Republic	D	2013–2017	109	1	6	7	81	—	—	—	—	—	
Smith, Brad	Canada	F	1980–1981	45	7	4	11	65	—	—	—	—	—	
Smith, Derek	Canada	D	2011–2015	83	2	11	13	24	—	—	—	—	—	
Smith, Mark	Canada	C	2007–2008	54	1	3	4	59	—	—	—	—	—	
Solovyov, Ilya	Belarus	D	2023–2025	15	0	4	4	6	—	—	—	—	—	
Staios, Steve	Canada	D	2009–2011	57	4	9	13	40	—	—	—	—	—	
Smith, Steve	Canada	D	1998–2001	102	1	20	21	139	—	—	—	—	—	Captain 1999–2000
Smyth, Greg	Canada	D	1991–1993	42	2	3	5	110	—	—	—	—	—	
Sonnenberg, Martin	Canada	LW	2003–2004	5	0	0	0	2	—	—	—	—	—	
Sorochan, Lee	Canada	D	1998–2000	3	0	0	0	—	—	—	—	—		
St. Louis, Martin	Canada	RW	1998–2000	69	4	16	20	32	—	—	—	—	—	
Stajan, Matt	Canada	C	2009–2018	558	59	131	190	279	14	1	3	4	21	
Stecher, Troy	Canada	D	2022–2023	20	3	4	7	15	—	—	—	—	—	
Stempniak, Lee	United States	RW	2011–2014	160	31	52	83	56	—	—	—	—	—	
Stern, Ron	Canada	RW	1990–1998	396	59	66	125	1288	31	6	6	12	85	
Stewart, Chris	Canada	RW	2017–2018	7	1	2	3	0	—	—	—	—	—	
Stiles, Tony	Canada	D	1983–1984	30	2	7	9	20	—	—	—	—	—	
Stillman, Cory	Canada	C	1994–2001	393	109	126	235	192	2	1	1	2	0	
Stone, Michael	Canada	D	2016–2023	228	17	32	49	119	13	3	3	6	4	
Street, Ben	Canada	C	2012–2014	19	0	2	2	4	—	—	—	—	—	
Strome, Ryan	Canada	C	2025–2026	19	5	7	12	8	—	—	—	—	—	
Stromgren, William	Sweden	LW	2025–2026	3	0	0	0	0	—	—	—	—	—	
Struch, David	Canada	C	1993–1994	4	0	0	0	4	—	—	—	—	—	
Stuart, Brad	Canada	D	2006–2007	27	0	5	5	18	6	0	1	1	6	
Sullivan, Mike	United States	C	1993–1997	205	20	28	48	54	18	4	6	10	10	
Sundblad, Niklas	Sweden	RW	1995–1996	2	0	0	0	0	—	—	—	—	—	
Suniev, Aydar	Russia	LW	2024–2026	7	0	1	1	2	—	—	—	—	—	
Suter, Gary	United States	D	1985–1994	617	128	437	565	872	49	6	33	39	66	SC 1989
Sutter, Brett	Canada	C	2008–2011	18	1	1	2	12	—	—	—	—	—	
Sutter, Ron	Canada	C	2000–2001	21	1	3	4	12	—	—	—	—	—	
Sweeney, Bob	United States	C	1995–1996	6	1	1	2	6	2	0	0	0	0	
Sweeney, Tim	United States	LW	1991–1992	53	8	11	19	12	—	—	—	—	—	
Tambellini, Steve	Canada	C	1983–1985	120	34	20	54	20	2	0	1	1	0	
Tanev, Chris	Canada	D	2020–2024	259	10	57	67	63	8	0	1	1	2	
Tanguay, Alex	Canada	F	2006–2008; 2010–2013	341	86	198	284	166	13	1	7	8	12	
Thompson, Rocky	Canada	RW	1997–1999	15	0	0	0	86	—	—	—	—	—	
Titov, German	Russia	C	1993–1998	345	107	121	228	142	18	7	6	13	14	
Tkachuk, Matthew	United States	LW	2016–2022	431	152	230	382	425	27	7	8	13	52	
Tkaczuk, Daniel	Canada	C	2000–2001	19	4	7	11	14	—	—	—	—	—	
Toffoli, Tyler	Canada	C	2021–2023	119	45	51	96	38	12	2	3	5	6	
Tonelli, John	Canada	C	1985–1988	161	40	76	116	164	31	9	14	23	61	
Torgayev, Pavel	Russia	C	1995–2000	50	6	12	18	18	1	0	0	0		
Turnbull, Randy	Canada	D	1981–1982	1	0	0	0	2	—	—	—	—	—	
Vail, Eric	Canada	F	1980–1982	70	32	37	69	23	6	0	0	0	0	
Valimaki, Juuso	Finland	D	2018–2022	82	3	13	16	48	2	0	1	1	0	
Van Brabant, Bryce	Canada	C	2013–2016	6	0	0	0	2	—	—	—	—	—	
Van der Gulik, David	Canada	RW	2008–2009	6	0	2	2	0	—	—	—	—	—	
Vandermeer, Jim	Canada	D	2007–2009	66	1	8	9	147	13	0	1	1	8	
Varlamov, Sergei	Ukraine	LW	1997–1998; 1999–2000	8	3	0	3	0	—	—	—	—	—	
Versteeg, Kris	Canada	RW	2016–2018	93	18	27	45	52	4	1	3	4	4	
Vey, Linden	Canada	C	2016–2017	4	0	0	0	0	—	—	—	—	—	
Viitakoski, Vesa	Finland	LW	1993–1996	23	2	4	6	8	—	—	—	—	—	
Volcan, Mickey	Canada	D	1983–1984	19	1	4	5	18	—	—	—	—	—	
Walker, Howard	Canada	D	1982–1983	3	0	0	0	7	—	—	—	—	—	
Walz, Wes	Canada	C	1993–1995	92	17	39	56	27	7	3	0	3	2	
Wappel, Gord	Canada	D	1980–1982	18	1	1	2	10	—	—	—	—	—	
Ward, Ed	Canada	RW	1994–1999	215	16	24	40	284	—	—	—	—	—	
Warrener, Rhett	Canada	D	2003–2008	231	11	26	37	239	37	0	1	1	30	
Weegar, MacKenzie	Canada	D	2022–2026	304	35	116	151	196	—	—	—	—	—	
Werenka, Brad	Canada	D	1999–2001	45	2	5	7	37	—	—	—	—	—	
Westgarth, Kevin	Canada	RW	2013–2015	36	4	3	7	64	—	—	—	—	—	
White, Ian	Canada	D	2009–2011	43	6	12	18	18	—	—	—	—	—	
Whitecloud, Zach	Canada	D	2025–2026	31	0	10	10	10	—	—	—	—	—	
Wideman, Dennis	Canada	D	2012–2017	280	32	104	136	126	11	0	7	7	12	
Wiebe, Abram	Canada	D	2025–2026	4	0	0	0	2	—	—	—	—	—	
Wiemer, Jason	Canada	C	1997–2001; 2005–2006	252	34	32	66	567	—	—	—	—	—	
Wilm, Clarke	Canada	C	1998–2002	303	31	42	73	250	—	—	—	—	—	
Wilson, Bert	Canada	LW	1980–1981	50	5	7	12	94	1	0	0	0	0	
Wilson, Carey	Canada	C	1983–1988; 1990–1993	355	102	161	263	160	32	6	6	12	10	
Wilson, Clay	Canada	D	2011–2012	5	0	0	0	4	—	—	—	—	—	
Wilson, Rik	United States	D	1985–1986	2	0	0	0	0	—	—	—	—	—	
Wolf, David	Germany	LW	2014–2015	3	0	0	0	2	1	0	0	0	0	
Wortman, Kevin	United States	D	1993–1994	5	0	0	0	2	—	—	—	—	—	
Wotherspoon, Tyler	Canada	D	2013–2017	30	0	5	5	4	6	0	0	0	0	
Wright, Jamie	Canada	LW	2001–2003	63	6	14	20	32	—	—	—	—	—	
Yawney, Trent	Canada	D	1991–1996	274	11	45	56	368	19	3	2	5	26	
Yelesin, Alexander	Russia	D	2019–2020	4	0	0	0	0	—	—	—	—	—	
Yelle, Stephane	Canada	C	2002–2008	339	31	65	96	174	43	6	3	9	32	
Young, C. J.	United States	RW	1992–1993	28	3	2	5	20	—	—	—	—	—	
Zadorov, Nikita	Russia	D	2021–2024	177	19	30	49	180	12	0	3	3	24	
Zary, Connor	Canada	C	2023–2026	191	39	47	86	58	—	—	—	—	—	
Zalapski, Zarley	Canada	D	1993–1998	178	21	55	76	220	18	0	8	8	16	
Zemlak, Richard	Canada	F	1991–1992	5	0	1	1	42	—	—	—	—	—	
Zohorna, Radim	Czech Republic	F	2022–2023	8	0	0	0	0	—	—	—	—	—	
Zyuzin, Andrei	Russia	D	2006–2007	49	1	5	6	30	5	1	0	1	2	
