= John Beech =

John Beech may refer to:

- John Beech (artist) (born 1964), British artist
- John P. Beech (1844–1926), English soldier who fought in the American Civil War, recipient of the Medal of Honor

== See also ==
- John Beach (1812–1874), US Army officer during the Black Hawk and Civil War
- John Beecher (disambiguation)
