= John Beecher =

John Beecher may refer to:

- John Beecher (poet) (1904–1980), American activist poet, writer, and journalist
- John Hubbard Beecher (1927–1987), American musician
- John Beecher (ice hockey) (born 2001), American ice hockey player

== See also ==
- Plas Johnson (born 1931), an American saxophonist who once used the stage name Johnny Beecher
- John Beech (disambiguation)
