= Jeff Jacques =

Jeff Jacques may refer to:

- Jeph Jacques (born 1980), writes and illustrates the webcomic Questionable Content
- Jeff Jacques (ice hockey) (born 1953), ice hockey player
