= Keith Smith (ice hockey) =

Canadian ice hockey player

- Born: May 7, 1953 (age 72) Burlington, Ontario, Canada
- Height: 6 ft 1 in (185 cm)
- Weight: 181 lb (82 kg; 12 st 13 lb)
- Position: Defence
- Played for: Brown; Fort Worth Wings
- NHL draft: 81st overall, 1973; New York Islanders
- WHA draft: 66th overall, 1973; Chicago Cougars
- Playing career: 1971–1974

Keith Smith is a Canadian retired ice hockey defenseman who was an All-American for Brown.

== Career ==
Despite the NCAA changing their rules to allow for four years of varsity play, Smith spent just three seasons with the Bears, graduating from Brown University in 1974. As a junior he was named to both the All-ECAC and All-American teams. He was regarded highly enough to be selected by the New York Islanders in the NHL Draft. Unfortunately, during his time at Brown, the hockey team was middling at best and missed the conference tournament all three seasons. After graduating, Smith played the tail end of the season with the Fort Worth Wings but decided against pursuing his hockey career and retired.

== Career statistics ==
=== Regular season and playoffs ===
| | | | Regular Season | | | | | Playoffs |
| Season | Team | League | GP | G | A | Pts | PIM | GP | G | A | Pts | PIM |
|---|---|---|---|---|---|---|---|---|---|---|---|---|
| 1971–72 | Brown | ECAC Hockey | — | 4 | 6 | 10 | 18 | — | — | — | — | — |
| 1972–73 | Brown | ECAC Hockey | — | 4 | 14 | 18 | 34 | — | — | — | — | — |
| 1973–74 | Brown | ECAC Hockey | 23 | 6 | 15 | 21 | 30 | — | — | — | — | — |
| 1973–74 | Fort Worth Wings | CHL | 8 | 0 | 1 | 1 | 4 | — | — | — | — | — |
| NCAA Totals | | | — | 14 | 35 | 49 | 82 | — | — | — | — | — |

== Awards and honors ==
| Award | Year |
|---|---|
| All-ECAC Hockey First Team | 1972–73 |
| AHCA East All-American | 1972–73 |
