= Mike Clarke (ice hockey, born 1953) =

Canadian ice hockey player

- Born: August 12, 1953 (age 72) Didsbury, Alberta, Canada
- Height: 6 ft 0 in (183 cm)
- Weight: 187 lb (85 kg; 13 st 5 lb)
- Position: Centre
- Shot: Left
- Played for: AHL; Richmond Robins; Springfield Indians; Adirondack Red Wings; New Haven Nighthawks
- NHL draft: 42nd overall, 1973; Philadelphia Flyers
- WHA draft: 26th overall, 1973; New England Whalers
- Playing career: 1973–1984

Mike Clarke (born August 12, 1953) is a Canadian former professional ice hockey player who, in 1973, was drafted by both the National Hockey League and World Hockey Association.

Although Clarke played 11 seasons of professional hockey, he never played a game in either of major leagues that had drafted him.

== Early life ==
Born 1953 in Didsbury, Alberta, Canada, Clarke played major junior hockey with the Calgary Centennials of the Western Hockey League.

== Career ==
Clarke was selected by the Philadelphia Flyers in the 3rd round (42nd overall) of the 1973 NHL Amateur Draft, and was also selected by the New England Whalers in the 2nd round (26th overall) of the 1973 WHA Amateur Draft.

Ckarke began his professional career in the American Hockey League (AHL) in 1973 with the Richmond Robins, then the minor league affiliate of the Philadelphia Flyers. Following his rookie campaign, Clarke was bounced around the minor leagues, playing in the AHL, NAHL, IHL, and EHL.

Clarke achieved his best success with the Flint Generals during the 1976–77 season when he racked up 108 points in 78 games with IHL team. In all he would play five seasons and 342 games with the Generals, scoring a total of 380 points for the Flint team.

Midway through the 1981–82 season, the Generals dealt Clarke to the Fort Wayne Komets where he continued to produce by scoring 127 points in 127 games for the Komets.

Clarke's 11 season professional career concluded following the 1983–84 season. He retired as a member of the Kalamazoo Wings after being traded to that team by Fort Wayne earlier that season. His total professional statistics are summed up with 721 points in 747 regular season games, with another 66 points scored in 60 post-season games.

== Career statistics ==
			Regular season					Playoffs
Season	Team	League	GP	G	A	Pts	PIM	GP	G	A	Pts	PIM
1971–72	Calgary Centennials	WCHL	38	0	6	6	8	—	—	—	—	—
1971–72	Lethbridge Sugar Kings	AJHL	23	13	22	35	16	—	—	—	—	—
1972–73	Calgary Centennials	WCHL	68	21	38	59	25	—	—	—	—	—
1973–74	Richmond Robins	AHL	73	17	30	47	23	5	2	6	8	4
1974–75	Philadelphia Firebirds	NAHL-Sr.	56	23	29	52	63	4	1	2	3	9
1974–75	Richmond Robins	AHL	11	1	3	4	6	—	—	—	—	—
1975–76	Flint Generals	IHL	63	39	34	73	16	4	1	5	6	6
1975–76	Springfield Indians	AHL	7	0	3	3	13	—	—	—	—	—
1976–77	Flint Generals	IHL	78	43	65	108	40	1	0	1	1	0
1977–78	Flint Generals	IHL	79	33	45	78	44	3	1	2	3	0
1978–79	Flint Generals	IHL	80	44	46	90	31	10	1	6	7	9
1979–80	Richmond Rifles	EHL-Pro	61	44	34	78	25	5	3	2	5	5
1979–80	Adirondack Red Wings	AHL	12	3	2	5	2	—	—	—	—	—
1980–81	Richmond Rifles	EHL-Pro	52	31	16	47	38	10	8	5	13	0
1980–81	New Haven Nighthawks	AHL	23	1	3	4	32	—	—	—	—	—
1981–82	Flint Generals	IHL	42	16	15	31	12	—	—	—	—	—
1981–82	Fort Wayne Komets	IHL	32	12	30	42	14	9	6	3	9	0
1982–83	Fort Wayne Komets	IHL	76	35	37	72	11	10	3	8	11	10
1983–84	Fort Wayne Komets	IHL	19	5	8	13	10	—	—	—	—	—
1983–84	Kalamazoo Wings	IHL	39	11	15	26	20	3	2	1	3	2
AHL totals			126	22	41	63	76	5	2	6	8	4
IHL totals			508	238	295	533	198	40	14	26	40	27
