= 1973 WHA amateur draft =

General information
- Date(s): May 18, 1973

Overview
- 122 total selections in 11 rounds
- First selection: (Canada) Bob Neely; Selected by: Chicago Cougars

The 1973 WHA amateur draft was the first draft for the World Hockey Association.

== Selections by round ==
Below are listed the selections in the 1973 WHA amateur draft.

Selections by round

Round 1 | Round 2 | Round 3 | Round 4 | Round 5 | Round 6 | Round 7 | Round 8 | Round 9 | Round 10 | Round 11

=== Round 1 ===
#	Player	Nationality	WHA team	College/junior/club team
1	Bob Neely (D)	Canada	Chicago Cougars	Peterborough Petes (OHA)
2	Glenn Goldup (F)	Canada	New England Whalers (from New York)	Toronto Marlboros (OHA)
3	Andre Savard (C)	Canada	Quebec Nordiques	Quebec Remparts (QMJHL)
4	Paulin Bordeleau (C)	France	Toronto Toros	Toronto Marlboros (OHA)
5	Colin Campbell (D)	Canada	Vancouver Blazers	Peterborough Petes (OHA)
6	John Rogers (RW)	Canada	Alberta Oilers	Edmonton Oil Kings (WCHL)
7	Bob Gainey (F)	Canada	Minnesota Fighting Saints	Peterborough Petes (OHA)
8	Reg Thomas (C)	Canada	Los Angeles Sharks	London Knights (OHA)
9	Darcy Rota (F)	Canada	Houston Aeros	Edmonton Oil Kings (WCHL)
10	Lanny McDonald (F)	Canada	Cleveland Crusaders	Medicine Hat Tigers (WCHL)
11	Ron Andruff (C)	Canada	Winnipeg Jets	Flin Flon Bombers (WCHL)
12	Blake Dunlop (F)	Canada	New England Whalers	Ottawa 67's (OHA)
13	Dean Talafous (F)	United States	Cincinnati Stingers	University of Wisconsin (WCHA)

=== Round 2 ===
#	Player	Nationality	WHA team	College/junior/club team
14	Blaine Stoughton (F)	Canada	Quebec Nordiques (from Cincinnati)	Flin Flon Bombers (WCHL)
15	Larry Goodenough (D)	Canada	Chicago Cougars	London Knights (OHA)
16	Al Sims (D)	Canada	New York Golden Blades	Cornwall Royals (QMJHL)
17	Morris Titanic (LW)	Canada	Quebec Nordiques	Sudbury Wolves (OHA)
18	Pat Hickey (F)	Canada	Toronto Toros	Hamilton Red Wings (OHA)
19	Brent Leavins (F)	Canada	Vancouver Blazers	Swift Current Broncos (WCHL)
20	Jim McCrimmon (D)	Canada	Alberta Oilers	Medicine Hat Tigers (WCHL)
21	Rick Middleton (F)	Canada	Minnesota Fighting Saints	Oshawa Generals (OHA)
22	Paul Sheard (LW)	Canada	Los Angeles Sharks	Ottawa 67's (OHA)
23	Tom Lysiak (F)	Canada	Houston Aeros	Medicine Hat Tigers (WCHL)
24	George Pesut (D)	Canada	Cleveland Crusaders	Saskatoon Blades (WCHL)
25	Keith Mackie (D)	Canada	Winnipeg Jets	Edmonton Oil Kings (WCHL)
26	Mike Clarke (C)	Canada	New England Whalers	Calgary Centennials (WCHL)

=== Round 3 ===
#	Player	Nationality	WHA team	College/junior/club team
27	Frank Rochon (LW)	Canada	Chicago Cougars	Sherbrooke Castors (QMJHL)
28	John Wensink (LW)	Netherlands	New York Golden Blades	Cornwall Royals (QMJHL)
29	Eric Vail (F)	Canada	Quebec Nordiques	Sudbury Wolves (OHA)
30	Blair MacDonald (RW)	Canada	Alberta Oilers (from Toronto)	Cornwall Royals (QMJHL)
31	Ed Humphreys (G)	Canada	Vancouver Blazers	Saskatoon Blades (WCHL)
32	Dave Lewis (D)	Canada	Alberta Oilers	Saskatoon Blades (WCHL)
33	Bob Gassoff (D)	Canada	Minnesota Fighting Saints	Medicine Hat Tigers (WCHL)
34	Doug Gibson (C)	Canada	Los Angeles Sharks	Peterborough Petes (OHA)
35	Vic Mercredi (LW)	Canada	Houston Aeros	New Westminster Bruins (WCHL)
36	Robbie Neale (F)	Canada	Cleveland Crusaders	Brandon Wheat Kings (WCHL)
37	Kelly Pratt (RW)	Canada	Winnipeg Jets	Swift Current Broncos (WCHL)
38	Tom Colley (C)	Canada	New England Whalers	Sudbury Wolves (OHA)

=== Round 4 ===
#	Player	Nationality	WHA team	College/junior/club team
39	Bill Laing (C)	Canada	Alberta Oilers (from Cincinnati)	Saskatoon Blades (WCHL)
40	Terry Ewasiuk (LW)	Canada	Chicago Cougars	Victoria Cougars (WCHL)
41	Randy Holt (D)	Canada	New England Whalers (from New York)	Sudbury Wolves (OHA)
42	Jean Landry (D)	Canada	Quebec Nordiques	Quebec Remparts (QMJHL)
43	Peter Marrin (C)	Canada	Toronto Toros	Toronto Marlboros (OHA)
44	Jean Tetreault (F)	Canada	Vancouver Blazers	Drummondville Rangers (QMJHL)
45	Jim Moxey (F)	Canada	Alberta Oilers	Hamilton Red Wings (OHA)
46	Steve Langdon (RW)	Canada	Minnesota Fighting Saints	London Knights (OHA)
47	Jim Cowell (F)	Canada	Los Angeles Sharks	Ottawa 67's (OHA)
48	Don Cutts (G)	Canada	Houston Aeros	R.P.I. (ECAC)
49	Russ Walker (RW)	Canada	Cleveland Crusaders	Saskatoon Blades (WCHL)
50	Peter Crosbie (G)	Canada	Los Angeles Sharks (from Winnipeg)	London Knights (OHA)
51	Alan Hangsleben (D)	United States	New England Whalers	University of North Dakota (WCHA)

=== Round 5 ===
#	Player	Nationality	WHA team	College/junior/club team
52	Bob Dailey (D)	Canada	Toronto Toros (from Cincinnati)	Toronto Marlboros (OHA)
53	Larry Patey (C)	Canada	New England Whalers (from Chicago)	Boston University (ECAC)
54	Doug Marit (D)	Canada	New York Golden Blades	Regina Pats (WCHL)
55	Denis Patry (F)	Canada	Quebec Nordiques	Drummondville Rangers (QMJHL)
56	Lou Nistico (LW)	Canada	Toronto Toros	London Knights (OHA)
57	Jimmy Jones (RW)	Canada	Vancouver Blazers	Peterborough Petes (OHA)
58	Ken Houston (D)	Canada	Alberta Oilers	Chatham Maroons (SOJHL)
59	Nelson Pyatt (C)	Canada	Minnesota Fighting Saints	Oshawa Generals (OHA)
60	Dennis Abgrall (RW)	Canada	Los Angeles Sharks	Saskatoon Blades (WCHL)
61	Paul O'Neil (C)	United States	Houston Aeros	Boston University (ECAC)
62	Rich Latulippe (F)	Canada	Cleveland Crusaders	Quebec Remparts (QMJHL)
63	Randy Smith (LW)	Canada	Winnipeg Jets	Edmonton Oil Kings (WCHL)
64	Cap Raeder (G)	United States	New England Whalers	University of New Hampshire (ECAC)

=== Round 6 ===
#	Player	Nationality	WHA team	College/junior/club team
65	Dave Pay (C)	Canada	Alberta Oilers (from Cincinnati)	University of Wisconsin (WCHA)
66	Keith Smith (D)	Canada	Chicago Cougars	Brown University (ECAC)
67	Dennis Ververgaert (RW)	Canada	New York Golden Blades	London Knights (OHA)
68	Dale Cook (F)	Canada	Quebec Nordiques	Victoria Cougars (WCHL)
69	Doug Ferguson (D)	Canada	Toronto Toros	Hamilton Red Wings (OHA)
70	Ian Turnbull (D)	Canada	Vancouver Blazers	Ottawa 67's (OHA)
71	Yvon Bouillon (F)	Canada	Alberta Oilers	Cornwall Royals (QMJHL)
72	John Flesch (LW)	Canada	Minnesota Fighting Saints	Lake Superior State University (CCHA)
73	Stu Davison (C)	Canada	Los Angeles Sharks	Cornwall Royals (QMJHL)
74	Dennis Owchar (D)	Canada	Houston Aeros	Toronto Marlboros (OHA)
75	Bob Smulders (F)	Canada	Cleveland Crusaders	Peterborough Petes (OHA)
76	Ron Kennedy (RW)	Canada	Winnipeg Jets	New Westminster Bruins (WCHL)
77	Rick Chinnick (F)	Canada	New England Whalers	Peterborough Petes (OHA)

=== Round 7 ===
#	Player	Nationality	WHA team	College/junior/club team
78	Gerrard Gibbons (D)	Canada	Toronto Toros (from Cincinnati)	Saint Mary University (CIAU)
79	Dennis Desgagnes (C)	Canada	Chicago Cougars	Sorel Black Hawks (QMJHL)
80	Lowell Ostlund (D)	Canada	New York Golden Blades	Saskatoon Blades (WCHL)
81	Andre Deschamps (F)	Canada	Quebec Nordiques	Quebec Remparts (QMJHL)
82	Gord Titcomb (LW)	Canada	Toronto Toros	St. Catharines Black Hawks (OHA)
83	Mike Korney (D)	Canada	Vancouver Blazers	Winnipeg Jets (WCHL)
84	Dwayne Pentland (D)	Canada	Alberta Oilers	Brandon Wheat Kings (WCHL)
85	Tom Machowski (D)	United States	Minnesota Fighting Saints	University of Wisconsin (WCHA)
86	David Lee (LW)	Canada	Los Angeles Sharks	Ottawa 67's (OHA)
87	Dan Hinton (F)	Canada	Houston Aeros	Sault Ste. Marie Greyhounds (OHA)
88	Ron Serafini (D)	United States	Cleveland Crusaders	St. Catharines Black Hawks (OHA)
89	Jeff Jacques (RW)	Canada	Winnipeg Jets	St. Catharines Black Hawks (OHA)
90	Steve Alley (LW)	United States	New England Whalers	University of Wisconsin (WCHA)

=== Round 8 ===
#	Player	Nationality	WHA team	College/junior/club team
91	Norm Barnes (D)	Canada	Cincinnati Stingers	Michigan State University (WCHA)
92	J. P. Burgoyne (D)	Canada	Chicago Cougars	Shawinigan Bruins (QMJHL)
93	Paul Granchukoff (F)	United States	New York Golden Blades	Medicine Hat Tigers (WCHL)
94	Bob Stumpf (D)	Canada	Quebec Nordiques	New Westminster Bruins (WCHL)
95	John Campbell (W)	Canada	Toronto Toros	Sault Ste. Marie Greyhounds (OHA)
96	Andre St. Laurent (C)	Canada	Vancouver Blazers	Montreal Red White and Blue (QMJHL)
97	Bob Young (D)	United States	Minnesota Fighting Saints	University of Denver (WCHA)
98	Sam Clegg (G)	Canada	Los Angeles Sharks	Medicine Hat Tigers (WCHL)
99	Lee Palmer (D)	Canada	Houston Aeros	Clarkson University (ECAC)
100	Michel Latrielle (D)	Canada	Cleveland Crusaders	Montreal Red White and Blue (QMJHL)
101	Terry McDougall (C)	Canada	Winnipeg Jets	Swift Current Broncos (WCHL)

=== Round 9 ===
#	Player	Nationality	WHA team	College/junior/club team
102	Mitch Brandt (D)	United States	Cincinnati Stingers	University of Denver (WCHA)
103	Gordon Halliday (F)	Canada	Chicago Cougars	University of Pennsylvania (ECAC)
104	Rick Austin (RW)	Canada	New York Golden Blades	Swift Current Broncos (WCHL)
105	Guy Ross (D)	Canada	Quebec Nordiques	Sherbrooke Castors (QMJHL)
106	Guido Tenesi (D)	United States	Toronto Toros	Oshawa Generals (OHA)
107	Pierre Laganiere (RW)	Canada	Vancouver Blazers	Sherbrooke Castors (QMJHL)
108	Neil Korzack (F)	Canada	Minnesota Fighting Saints	Peterborough Petes (OHA)
109	Randy Aimoe (D)	Canada	Los Angeles Sharks	Medicine Hat Tigers (WCHL)
110	Sean Shanahan (LW)	Canada	Houston Aeros	Providence College (ECAC)
111	Bruce Greig (LW)	Canada	Cleveland Crusaders	Vancouver Nats (WCHL)
112	Russ Wiechnik (C)	Canada	Winnipeg Jets	Calgary Centennials (WCHL)

=== Round 10 ===
#	Player	Nationality	WHA team	College/junior/club team
113	Jack Johnson (F)	United States	Cincinnati Stingers	University of Wisconsin (WCHA)
114	Mike Haramis (RW)	Canada	Chicago Cougars	Laval National (QMJHL)
115	Brian Dick (C)	Canada	New York Golden Blades	Winnipeg Jets (WCHL)
116	Michel Belisle (F)	Canada	Quebec Nordiques	Montreal Red White and Blue (QMJHL)
117	Brian Molvik (D)	Canada	Vancouver Blazers	Calgary Centennials (WCHL)
118	Pat Phippen (LW)	United States	Minnesota Fighting Saints	St. Paul Bruins
119	Yvon Dupuis (F)	Canada	Houson Aeros	Quebec Remparts (QMJHL)
120	Henry Durkin (G)	Canada	Cleveland Crusaders	Swift Current Broncos (WCHL)
121	Mike Kennedy (RW)	Canada	Winnipeg Jets	Kitchener Rangers (OHA)

=== Round 11 ===
#	Player	Nationality	WHA team	College/junior/club team
122	Bob Bilodeau (D)	Canada	Cincinnati Stingers	New Westminster Bruins (WCHL)

== Draftees based on nationality ==
Rank	Country	Amount
	North America	120
1	Canada	107
2	United States	13
	Europe	2
3	France	1
4	Netherlands	1

== See also ==
- 1973 NHL amateur draft
- 1973–74 WHA season

Preceded by none	WHA draft 1973	Succeeded by 1974 WHA amateur draft
