= Ron Kennedy =

Canadian ice hockey player and coach

- Born: May 7, 1953; North Battleford, Saskatchewan, Canada
- Died: July 9, 2009 (aged 56); Klagenfurt, Austria
- Height: 5 ft 11 in (180 cm)
- Weight: 175 lb (79 kg; 12 st 7 lb)
- Position: Right wing
- Shot: Right
- Played for: Muskegon Mohawks; Kalamazoo Wings
- NHL draft: 65th overall, 1973; New York Islanders
- WHA draft: 76th overall, 1973; Winnipeg Jets
- Playing career: 1973–1988

Ron Kennedy (May 7, 1953 – July 9, 2009) was a Canadian ice hockey player and coach.

== Early life ==
Kennedy was born in North Battleford, Saskatchewan, Canada.

== Career ==
Kennedy played minor-league hockey in North America, Sweden, the Netherlands, Germany, and Austria before moving to coaching.

== Coaching career ==
Kennedy's last position was coaching for Innsbruck of the Austrian Hockey League.

His coaching career included:

- Medicine Hat Tigers (Western Hockey League)
- Villach, Austria - won the Austrian championship in his first year (1992–1994)
- New York Islanders assistant coach
- EC Hannover, Eisbären Berlin and ERC Ingolstadt (Deutsche Eishockey Liga)
- Head coach of the Austrian national team (1996–2002)
- Villach, Austria (second time)
- Innsbruck (Austria) and Bolzano (Italy)
- Canadian national team coach for the 2006 Deutschland Cup

== Death ==
Kennedy resigned after his December 2008 diagnosis of brain cancer, from which he died, aged 56, in Klagenfurt, Austria.
