= Dennis Owchar =

Canadian ice hockey player

- Born: March 28, 1953 (age 73) Dryden, Ontario, Canada
- Height: 5 ft 11 in (180 cm)
- Weight: 188 lb (85 kg; 13 st 6 lb)
- Position: Defence
- Shot: Right
- Played for: Pittsburgh Penguins; Colorado Rockies
- NHL draft: 55th overall, 1973; Pittsburgh Penguins
- WHA draft: 74th overall, 1973; Houston Aeros
- Playing career: 1973–1982

Dennis Owchar (born March 28, 1953) is a Canadian retired professional ice hockey player who played 288 games in the National Hockey League. He was born in Dryden, Ontario. He played with the Pittsburgh Penguins and Colorado Rockies.

== Career statistics ==
=== Regular season and playoffs ===
			Regular season					Playoffs
Season	Team	League	GP	G	A	Pts	PIM	GP	G	A	Pts	PIM
1972–73	St. Catharines Black Hawks	OHA	19	3	13	16	13	—	—	—	—	—
1972–73	Toronto Marlboros	OHA	20	7	8	15	27	—	—	—	—	—
1973–74	Hershey Bears	AHL	74	16	17	33	51	14	1	5	6	14
1974–75	Hershey Bears	AHL	24	3	14	17	31	4	0	1	1	0
1974–75	Pittsburgh Penguins	NHL	46	6	11	17	67	6	0	1	1	4
1975–76	Hershey Bears	AHL	7	5	1	6	13	—	—	—	—	—
1975–76	Pittsburgh Penguins	NHL	54	5	12	17	19	2	0	0	0	2
1976–77	Pittsburgh Penguins	NHL	46	5	18	23	37	—	—	—	—	—
1977–78	Pittsburgh Penguins	NHL	22	2	8	10	23	—	—	—	—	—
1977–78	Colorado Rockies	NHL	60	8	23	31	25	2	1	0	1	2
1978–79	Colorado Rockies	NHL	50	3	13	16	27	—	—	—	—	—
1979–80	New Haven Nighthawks	AHL	40	6	27	33	26	—	—	—	—	—
1979–80	Colorado Rockies	NHL	10	1	0	1	2	—	—	—	—	—
1981–82	New Haven Nighthawks	AHL	57	2	16	18	67	4	0	0	0	5
NHL totals			288	30	85	115	200	10	1	1	2	8
