= Guido Tenesi =

American ice hockey defenceman (1953–2025)

- Born: July 5, 1953 Detroit, Michigan, U.S.
- Died: June 17, 2025 (aged 71)
- Height: 6 ft 1 in (185 cm)
- Weight: 185 lb (84 kg; 13 st 3 lb)
- Position: Defense
- Shot: Left
- Played for: Dayton/Grand Rapids Owls; Hershey Bears; Johnstown Jets; Maine Nordiques; Tulsa Oilers
- National team: Italy
- NHL draft: 71st overall, 1973; Pittsburgh Penguins
- WHA draft: 106th overall, 1973; Toronto Toros
- Playing career: 1973–1980

Guido Rocco Tenesi (July 5, 1953 – June 17, 2025) was an American ice hockey defenseman who played seven seasons of professional hockey from 1973 to 1980. He was drafted by the Pittsburgh Penguins in the 5th round (71st overall) of the 1973 NHL Amateur Draft, and was also drafted by the Toronto Toros in the 9th round (106th overall) of the 1973 WHA Amateur Draft.

== Career ==
Tenesi played in the American Hockey League with the Hershey Bears. He played ten games with the Bears during the 1973–74 season, but was not with the team when the Bears won their fifth Calder Cup in team history. He also played in the International Hockey League, Central Hockey League and the North American Hockey League.

Tenesi spent the final years of his career playing in Italy's Serie A, the premier ice hockey league of Italy. He played for Italy in the 1982 IIHF World Hockey Championship in Helsinki, Finland, leading Italy to a 7th-place finish. Tenesi scored Italy's first goal vs the USA on April 16, 1982 in a 7–5 win. Aside from a secondary assist in a match vs Canada, Tenesi was held scoreless for the remainder of the tournament.

== Acting ==
Tenesi was one of several Johnstown Jets players who were cast in the movie Slap Shot. He was cast as Billy Charlebois, a defenseman on the team who was popular with the ladies and would always find time to check himself out in a mirror. Although in real life he was born in Detroit, Tenesi's character is said to be from "Moose Jaw, Saskatchewan" during one of the Chiefs' fashion shows.

Tenesi was one of three primary characters on the Jets' roster to not have a speaking part.

== Personal life and death ==
In 1988, Tenesi retired from professional hockey. He returned to Toronto, where he became a service technician for a major swimming pool dealer.

Tenesi died on June 17, 2025, at the age of 71.

== Awards ==
- 1974–75, Lockhart Cup, as a member of the Johnstown Jets
- 1978–79, Governor's Trophy, awarded to the IHL's most outstanding defenseman
