= Bob Stumpf =

Canadian ice hockey player

- Born: April 25, 1953; Milo, Alberta, Canada
- Died: February 17, 2013 (aged 59)
- Height: 6 ft 1 in (185 cm)
- Weight: 195 lb (88 kg; 13 st 13 lb)
- Position: Defence
- Shot: Right
- Played for: St. Louis Blues; Pittsburgh Penguins
- NHL draft: 40th overall, 1973; Philadelphia Flyers
- WHA draft: 94th overall, 1973; Quebec Nordiques
- Playing career: 1973–1976

Robert David "Bob" Stumpf (April 25, 1953 – February 17, 2013) was a Canadian professional ice hockey player. He played 10 games in the National Hockey League with the St. Louis Blues and Pittsburgh Penguins during the 1974–75 season.

== Career statistics ==
=== Regular season and playoffs ===
			Regular season					Playoffs
Season	Team	League	GP	G	A	Pts	PIM	GP	G	A	Pts	PIM
1968–69	Red Deer Rustlers	AJHL	—	1	8	9	—	—	—	—	—	—
1969–70	Red Deer Rustlers	AJHL	37	13	16	29	138	—	—	—	—	—
1970–71	Estevan Bruins	WCHL	64	3	28	31	174	4	1	1	2	0
1971–72	New Westminster Bruins	WCHL	66	7	43	50	226	5	0	3	3	4
1972–73	New Westminster Bruins	WCHL	46	19	43	62	93	3	4	2	6	28
1973–74	Richmond Robins	AHL	6	0	4	4	6	—	—	—	—	—
1973–74	Denver Spurs	WHL	67	18	20	38	85	—	—	—	—	—
1974–75	St. Louis Blues	NHL	7	1	1	2	16	—	—	—	—	—
1974–75	Pittsburgh Penguins	NHL	3	0	0	0	4	—	—	—	—	—
1974–75	Denver Spurs	CHL	34	3	14	17	72	—	—	—	—	—
1974–75	Hershey Bears	AHL	17	2	4	6	18	—	—	—	—	—
1975–76	Hershey Bears	AHL	69	2	22	24	128	10	1	2	3	4
AHL totals			92	4	30	34	152	10	1	2	3	4
NHL totals			10	1	1	2	20	—	—	—	—	—
