= Dwayne Pentland =

Canadian ice hockey player

- Born: February 28, 1953 (age 72); Vancouver, British Columbia, Canada
- Height: 5 ft 11 in (180 cm)
- Weight: 185 lb (84 kg; 13 st 3 lb)
- Position: Defence
- Shot: Left
- Played for: Houston Aeros
- NHL draft: 94th overall, 1973; New York Rangers
- WHA draft: 84th overall, 1973; Alberta Oilers
- Playing career: 1973–1980

Dwayne Pentland (born February 28, 1953, in Vancouver, British Columbia) is a retired ice hockey player. He played in the World Hockey Association for the Houston Aeros.

== Career statistics ==
			Regular season					Playoffs
Season	Team	League	GP	G	A	Pts	PIM	GP	G	A	Pts	PIM
1969–70	Penticton Broncos	BCJHL	48	10	38	48	0	—	—	—	—	—
1970–71	Brandon Wheat Kings	WCHL	65	7	29	36	95	—	—	—	—	—
1971–72	Brandon Wheat Kings	WCHL	67	10	63	73	90	—	—	—	—	—
1972–73	Brandon Wheat Kings	WCHL	67	9	44	53	45	—	—	—	—	—
1973–74	Albuquerque Six Guns	CHL	63	0	19	19	57	—	—	—	—	—
1974–75	New Haven Nighthawks	AHL	46	0	10	10	29	—	—	—	—	—
1975–76	Providence Reds	AHL	59	0	13	13	51	3	0	0	0	2
1976–77	Houston Aeros	WHA	29	1	2	3	6	2	0	0	0	0
1976–77	Oklahoma City Blazers	CHL	39	1	13	14	50	—	—	—	—	—
1977–78	Fort Wayne Komets	IHL	6	0	4	4	12	—	—	—	—	—
1977–78	San Diego Mariners	PHL	42	4	25	29	52	—	—	—	—	—
1978–79	San Diego Hawks	PHL	58	7	38	45	51	—	—	—	—	—
1979–80	Spokane Flyers	WIHL	—	—	—	—	—	—	—	—	—	—
WHA totals			29	1	2	3	6	2	0	0	0	0
AHL totals			105	0	23	23	80	3	0	0	0	2
