= Dan Hinton =

Canadian ice hockey player

- Born: May 24, 1953 Toronto, Ontario, Canada
- Died: June 1, 1994 (aged 41) Mississauga, Ontario, Canada
- Height: 5 ft 11 in (180 cm)
- Weight: 165 lb (75 kg; 11 st 11 lb)
- Position: Left wing
- Shot: Left
- Played for: Chicago Black Hawks
- NHL draft: 77th overall, 1973; Chicago Black Hawks
- WHA draft: 87th overall, 1973; Houston Aeros
- Playing career: 1973–1979

Daniel Anthony Hinton (May 24, 1953 – June 1, 1994) was a Canadian professional ice hockey forward. He was drafted by the Chicago Black Hawks in the fifth round, 77th overall, of the 1973 NHL Amateur Draft. He was also drafted by the Houston Aeros in the seventh round, 87th overall, of the 1973 WHA Amateur Draft; however, he never played in the World Hockey Association. Hinton played fourteen National Hockey League games with the Black Hawks in the 1976–77 season, scoring no points.

== Career statistics ==
			Regular season					Playoffs
Season	Team	League	GP	G	A	Pts	PIM	GP	G	A	Pts	PIM
1971–72	Kitchener Rangers	OHA-Jr.	56	15	14	29	89	5	1	1	2	11
1972–73	Sault Ste. Marie Greyhounds	OHA-Jr.	47	22	38	60	99	—	—	—	—	—
1973–74	Dallas Black Hawks	CHL	65	11	7	18	51	10	2	5	7	9
1974–75	Dallas Black Hawks	CHL	74	24	13	37	107	10	8	3	11	26
1975–76	Dallas Black Hawks	CHL	75	20	32	52	105	10	5	3	8	23
1976–77	Chicago Blackhawks	NHL	14	0	0	0	16	—	—	—	—	—
1976–77	Dallas Black Hawks	CHL	60	13	22	35	77	5	1	2	3	6
1977–78	Dallas Black Hawks	CHL	64	20	13	33	57	13	2	1	3	12
1978–79	New Brunswick Hawks	AHL	79	21	31	52	56	4	2	0	2	7
NHL totals			14	0	0	0	16	—	—	—	—	—
CHL totals			338	88	87	175	397	48	18	14	32	76
