= Jean Tétreault =

Canadian ice hockey player

- Born: January 22, 1953 (age 73) Sainte-Thérèse, Quebec, Canada
- Height: 6 ft 0 in (183 cm)
- Weight: 165 lb (75 kg; 11 st 11 lb)
- Position: Left wing
- Shot: Left
- Played for: Vancouver Blazers; Minnesota Fighting Saints
- NHL draft: 120th overall, 1973; St. Louis Blues
- WHA draft: 44th overall, 1973; Vancouver Blazers
- Playing career: 1973–1978

Jean Rosario Tétreault (born January 22, 1953) is a Canadian former professional ice hockey player who played in the World Hockey Association (WHA). Drafted in the eighth round of the 1973 NHL Amateur Draft by the St. Louis Blues, Tétreault opted to play in the WHA after being selected by the Vancouver Blazers in the fourth round of the 1973 WHA Amateur Draft. He played parts of two WHA seasons with the Vancouver Blazers and Minnesota Fighting Saints. Tétreault played the role of Andre Bergeron (#8) in the 1977 comedy film Slap Shot.

== Career statistics ==
=== Regular season and playoffs ===
			Regular season					Playoffs
Season	Team	League	GP	G	A	Pts	PIM	GP	G	A	Pts	PIM
1970–71	Montreal Junior Canadiens	OHA	55	7	13	20	54	—	—	—	—	—
1971–72	Montreal Junior Canadiens	OHA	59	19	25	44	77	—	—	—	—	—
1972–73	Montreal Red White and Blue	QMJHL	10	2	4	6	6	—	—	—	—	—
1972–73	Drummondville Rangers	QMJHL	51	28	58	86	62	—	—	—	—	—
1973–74	Roanoke Valley Rebels	SHL	68	31	44	75	81	14	5	4	9	6
1973–74	Vancouver Blazers	WHA	6	1	1	2	0	—	—	—	—	—
1974–75	Johnstown Jets	NAHL	57	22	32	54	62	15	6	10	16	4
1975–76	Johnstown Jets	NAHL	72	25	49	74	73	9	4	9	13	23
1975–76	Minnesota Fighting Saints	WHA	3	0	0	0	0	—	—	—	—	—
1976–77	Tidewater Sharks	SHL	8	2	7	9	6	—	—	—	—	—
1976–77	Johnstown Jets	NAHL	69	29	56	85	79	3	0	2	2	12
1977–78	Muskegon Mohawks	IHL	19	1	9	10	9	—	—	—	—	—
WHA totals			9	1	1	2	0	—	—	—	—	—
