= Bob Neely =

Canadian ice hockey player (born 1953)

- Born: November 9, 1953 (age 72) Sarnia, Ontario, Canada
- Height: 6 ft 1 in (185 cm)
- Weight: 210 lb (95 kg; 15 st 0 lb)
- Position: Left Defence
- Shot: Left
- Played for: Toronto Maple Leafs; Colorado Rockies
- NHL draft: 10th overall, 1973; Toronto Maple Leafs
- WHA draft: 1st overall, 1973; Chicago Cougars
- Playing career: 1973–1980

Robert Barry Neely (born November 9, 1953) is a Canadian former professional ice hockey player who played 283 NHL games for the Toronto Maple Leafs and the Colorado Rockies. He was drafted first overall in the 1973 WHA Amateur Draft by the Chicago Cougars, and 10th overall by the Maple Leafs in the NHL Amateur Draft. Neely opted to sign with the Maple Leafs. In his five-season career, Neely scored 39 goals and 59 assists, with five goals and seven assists in 26 playoff games. Bob also won a bronze medal for Team Canada 1978 in Moscow at the Izvestia Cup.

== Career statistics ==
			Regular season					Playoffs
Season	Team	League	GP	G	A	Pts	PIM	GP	G	A	Pts	PIM
1970–71	Hamilton Red Wings	OHA-Jr.	34	4	11	15	129	7	0	4	4	4
1971–72	Hamilton Red Wings	OHA-Jr.	17	3	8	11	109	—	—	—	—	—
1971–72	Peterborough Petes	OHA-Jr.	32	8	22	30	96	15	4	8	12	76
1971–72	Peterborough Petes	MC	—	—	—	—	—	3	0	2	2	6
1972–73	Peterborough Petes	OHA-Jr.	55	24	52	76	304	17	3	17	20	44
1973–74	Toronto Maple Leafs	NHL	54	5	7	12	98	4	1	3	4	0
1974–75	Toronto Maple Leafs	NHL	57	5	16	21	61	3	0	0	0	2
1974–75	Oklahoma City Blazers	CHL	9	2	4	6	14	—	—	—	—	—
1975–76	Toronto Maple Leafs	NHL	69	9	13	22	89	10	3	1	4	7
1976–77	Toronto Maple Leafs	NHL	70	17	16	33	16	9	1	3	4	6
1977–78	Toronto Maple Leafs	NHL	11	0	1	1	0	—	—	—	—	—
1977–78	Colorado Rockies	NHL	22	3	6	9	2	—	—	—	—	—
1977–78	Philadelphia Firebirds	AHL	29	6	14	20	47	4	1	3	4	2
1978–79	New Brunswick Hawks	AHL	60	17	29	46	55	5	0	1	1	0
1979–80	New Brunswick Hawks	AHL	64	14	51	65	46	8	1	4	5	2
NHL totals			283	39	59	98	266	26	5	7	12	15
AHL totals			153	37	94	131	148	17	2	8	10	4

Preceded by Lanny McDonald	Toronto Maple Leafs first-round draft pick 1973	Succeeded by Ian Turnbull
Preceded by None	WHA First Overall Draft Pick; 1973	Succeeded by Pat Price
Preceded by None	Chicago Cougars first round draft pick 1973	Succeeded by Paul McIntosh
