= Steve Langdon (ice hockey) =

Canadian ice hockey player

- Born: December 23, 1953 (age 71); Toronto, Ontario, Canada
- Height: 5 ft 11 in (180 cm)
- Weight: 175 lb (79 kg; 12 st 7 lb)
- Position: Right Wing
- Shot: Left
- Played for: Boston Bruins
- NHL draft: 63rd overall, 1973; Boston Bruins
- WHA draft: 46th overall, 1973; Minnesota Fighting Saints
- Playing career: 1973–1979

Stephen Murray Langdon (born December 23, 1953) is a Canadian former professional ice hockey left winger. He played seven regular-season National Hockey League games with the Boston Bruins between 1975 and 1977, recording one assist. He also appeared in four games with the Bruins during the 1976 NHL playoffs. The rest of his career, which lasted from 1973 to 1979, was spent in different minor leagues.

== Early life ==
Langdon was born in Toronto, Ontario. As a youth, he played in the 1966 Quebec International Pee-Wee Hockey Tournament with the Toronto Shopsy's minor ice hockey team.

== Career ==
Langdon was drafted in the fourth round, 63rd overall, of the 1973 NHL Amateur Draft by the Bruins. Langdon was also drafted by the Minnesota Fighting Saints in the 1973 WHA Amateur Draft; however, he never played in the World Hockey Association. He later coached his son's youth hockey team in the Rochester Youth Hockey House program.

== Career statistics ==
=== Regular season and playoffs ===
			Regular season					Playoffs
Season	Team	League	GP	G	A	Pts	PIM	GP	G	A	Pts	PIM
1970–71	Markham Waxers	MTJHL	—	—	—	—	—	—	—	—	—	—
1971–72	Toronto Marlboros	OHA	14	1	3	4	2	—	—	—	—	—
1971–72	Markham Waxers	MTJHL	—	—	—	—	—	—	—	—	—	—
1972–73	London Knights	OHA	72	31	47	78	93	—	—	—	—	—
1973–74	Albuquerque Six Guns	CHL	67	21	13	34	16	—	—	—	—	—
1974–75	Boston Bruins	NHL	1	0	1	1	0	—	—	—	—	—
1974–75	Rochester Americans	AHL	56	8	11	19	8	12	0	2	2	5
1974–75	Broome Dusters	NAHL	1	3	1	4	0	—	—	—	—	—
1975–76	Boston Bruins	NHL	4	0	0	0	2	4	0	0	0	0
1975–76	Rochester Americans	AHL	62	18	11	29	11	5	0	1	1	0
1975–76	Broome Dusters	NAHL	2	0	1	1	2	—	—	—	—	—
1976–77	Rochester Americans	AHL	43	16	15	31	4	12	2	5	7	2
1977–78	Boston Bruins	NHL	2	0	0	0	0	—	—	—	—	—
1977–78	Rochester Americans	AHL	72	30	27	57	0	6	1	3	4	0
1978–79	Rochester Americans	AHL	80	25	23	48	14	—	—	—	—	—
AHL totals			313	97	87	184	37	35	3	11	14	7
NHL totals			7	0	1	1	2	4	0	0	0	0
