= Sean Shanahan =

Canadian ice hockey player (1951–2022)

- Born: February 8, 1951; Toronto, Ontario, Canada
- Died: May 15, 2022 (aged 71)
- Height: 6 ft 3 in (191 cm)
- Weight: 205 lb (93 kg; 14 st 9 lb)
- Position: Left wing
- Shot: Right
- Played for: Montreal Canadiens; Boston Bruins; Colorado Rockies; Cincinnati Stingers
- NHL draft: Undrafted
- WHA draft: 110th overall, 1973; Houston Aeros
- Playing career: 1973–1979

Sean Bryan Shanahan (February 8, 1951 – May 15, 2022) was a Canadian professional ice hockey left winger.

== Biography ==
Shanahan was drafted by the Houston Aeros in the ninth round, 110th overall, of the 1973 WHA Amateur Draft. He caused some controversy in Boston by being the first person after Hockey Hall of Fame player Phil Esposito to wear #7. He also played four games in the World Hockey Association with the Cincinnati Stingers.

Shanahan died on May 15, 2022, at the age of 71.

== Career statistics ==
Regular season and playoffs

			Regular season					Playoffs
Season	Team	League	GP	G	A	Pts	PIM	GP	G	A	Pts	PIM
1967–68	North York Rangers	MJBHL	—	—	—	—	—	—	—	—	—	—
1968–69	Kitchener Rangers	OHA	50	3	8	11	37	—	—	—	—	—
1969–70	Markham Waxers	MetJHL	—	—	—	—	—	—	—	—	—	—
1969–70	Toronto Marlboros	OHA	19	2	4	6	5	—	—	—	—	—
1970–71	Toronto Marlboros	OHA	6	0	0	0	0	—	—	—	—	—
1970–71	Oshawa Generals	OHA	24	1	4	5	14	—	—	—	—	—
1971–72	Providence College	ECAC	23	13	15	28	—	—	—	—	—	—
1972–73	Providence College	ECAC	25	13	23	36	8	—	—	—	—	—
1973–74	Nova Scotia Voyageurs	AHL	63	13	14	27	65	6	1	0	1	6
1974–75	Nova Scotia Voyageurs	AHL	67	12	10	22	159	6	0	0	0	58
1975–76	Montreal Canadiens	NHL	4	0	0	0	0	—	—	—	—	—
1975–76	Nova Scotia Voyageurs	AHL	64	18	26	44	91	9	4	6	10	11
1976–77	Colorado Rockies	NHL	30	1	3	4	40	—	—	—	—	—
1976–77	Rhode Island Reds	AHL	10	0	1	1	11	—	—	—	—	—
1976–77	Dallas Black Hawks	CHL	7	0	0	0	25	5	1	0	1	19
1977–78	Boston Bruins	NHL	6	0	0	0	7	—	—	—	—	—
1977–78	Rochester Americans	AHL	66	20	23	43	156	6	2	3	5	10
1978–79	Cincinnati Stingers	WHA	4	0	0	0	7	—	—	—	—	—
WHA totals			4	0	0	0	7	—	—	—	—	—
NHL totals			40	1	3	4	47	—	—	—	—	—
