= Jean Landry (ice hockey) =

Canadian ice hockey player

- Born: June 14, 1953 (age 72) Montreal, Quebec, Canada
- Height: 5 ft 11 in (180 cm)
- Weight: 175 lb (79 kg; 12 st 7 lb)
- Position: Defence
- Shot: Left
- Played for: AHL; Cincinnati Swords; Hershey Bears
- NHL draft: 28th overall, 1973; Buffalo Sabres
- WHA draft: 42nd overall, 1973; Quebec Nordiques
- Playing career: 1974–1977

Jean Landry (born June 14, 1953) is a Canadian former professional ice hockey defenceman. He was selected by the Buffalo Sabres in the second round (28th overall) of the 1973 NHL Amateur Draft, and was also drafted by the Quebec Nordiques in the fourth round (42nd overall) of the 1973 WHA Amateur Draft.

== Career statistics ==
			Regular season					Playoffs
Season	Team	League	GP	G	A	Pts	PIM	GP	G	A	Pts	PIM
1969–70	Quebec Remparts	QMJHL	56	4	12	16	129	15	0	4	4	25
1970–71	Quebec Remparts	QMJHL	62	6	41	47	46	13	1	5	6	21
1971–72	Quebec Remparts	QMJHL	60	18	51	69	57	15	5	8	13	14
1972–73	Quebec Remparts	QMJHL	63	20	45	65	71	14	3	13	16	10
1973–74	Cincinnati Swords	AHL	73	5	16	21	16	5	1	0	1	0
1974–75	Hershey Bears	AHL	63	8	8	16	38	7	0	0	0	14
1975–76	Charlotte Checkers	SHL-Sr.	57	12	23	35	40	—	—	—	—	—
1975–76	Roanoke Valley Rebels	SHL-Sr.	10	2	2	4	2	5	0	2	2	4
1976–77	Tidewater Sharks	SHL-Sr.	14	1	4	5	15	—	—	—	—	—
1976–77	Johnstown Jets	NAHL-Sr.	34	10	5	15	40	3	0	0	0	0
AHL totals			136	13	24	37	54	12	1	0	1	18

== Awards and honours ==
Award	Year
QMJHL First All-Star Team	1972–73
