= Jim Moxey =

Canadian ice hockey player

- Born: May 28, 1953 (age 71); Toronto, Ontario, Canada
- Height: 6 ft 1 in (185 cm)
- Weight: 190 lb (86 kg; 13 st 8 lb)
- Position: Forward
- Shot: Left
- Played for: California Golden Seals; Cleveland Barons; Los Angeles Kings
- NHL draft: 66th overall, 1973; California Golden Seals
- WHA draft: 45th overall, 1973; Alberta Oilers
- Playing career: 1973–1978

James George Moxey (born May 28, 1953) is a Canadian retired professional ice hockey forward. Born in Toronto, Ontario, Moxey played 127 games in the National Hockey League for the Cleveland Barons, Los Angeles Kings, and California Golden Seals between 1974 and 1977. As a youth, he played in the 1965 Quebec International Pee-Wee Hockey Tournament with the Toronto George Bell minor ice hockey team.

== Career statistics ==
=== Regular season and playoffs ===
			Regular season					Playoffs
Season	Team	League	GP	G	A	Pts	PIM	GP	G	A	Pts	PIM
1970–71	Hamilton Red Wings	OHA	43	10	5	15	46	—	—	—	—	—
1971–72	Hamilton Red Wings	OHA	62	20	35	55	71	—	—	—	—	—
1972–73	Hamilton Red Wings	OHA	59	40	40	80	85	—	—	—	—	—
1973–74	Salt Lake Golden Eagles	WHL	76	26	23	49	83	5	0	0	0	0
1974–75	California Golden Seals	NHL	47	5	4	9	4	—	—	—	—	—
1974–75	Salt Lake Golden Eagles	CHL	11	3	11	14	7	—	—	—	—	—
1975–76	California Golden Seals	NHL	44	10	16	26	33	—	—	—	—	—
1975–76	Salt Lake Golden Eagles	CHL	30	11	17	28	31	—	—	—	—	—
1976–77	Cleveland Barons	NHL	35	7	7	14	20	—	—	—	—	—
1976–77	Salt Lake Golden Eagles	CHL	4	6	3	9	4	—	—	—	—	—
1976–77	Los Angeles Kings	NHL	1	0	0	0	0	—	—	—	—	—
1976–77	Fort Worth Texans	CHL	29	9	9	18	27	6	1	1	2	2
1977–78	Springfield Indians	AHL	71	22	34	56	24	4	0	0	0	5
NHL totals			127	22	27	49	59	—	—	—	—	—
