= Gerard Gibbons =

Canadian ice hockey player

- Born: January 7, 1953 (age 73) St. John's, Newfoundland, Canada
- Height: 6 ft 3 in (191 cm)
- Weight: 185 lb (84 kg; 13 st 3 lb)
- Position: Defence
- Shot: Left
- Played for: Toronto Toros
- NHL draft: 80th overall, 1973; Montreal Canadiens
- WHA draft: 78th overall, 1973; Toronto Toros
- Playing career: 1973–1977

Gerard Gibbons (born January 7, 1953) is a former Canadian professional ice hockey player who played in the World Hockey Association (WHA). Drafted in the fifth round of the 1973 NHL Amateur Draft by the Montreal Canadiens, Gibbons opted to play in the WHA after being selected by the Toronto Toros in the seventh round of the 1973 WHA Amateur Draft. He played parts of two WHA seasons for the Toros. His older brother, Brian Gibbons, also played in the WHA.

== Career statistics ==
=== Regular season and playoffs ===
| | | | Regular season | | | | | Playoffs |
| Season | Team | League | GP | G | A | Pts | PIM | GP | G | A | Pts | PIM |
|---|---|---|---|---|---|---|---|---|---|---|---|---|
| 1970–71 | Cape Breton Metros | MJAHL | Statistics Unavailable |
| 1972–73 | St. Mary's University | CIAU | Statistics Unavailable |
| 1973–74 | Jacksonville Barons | AHL | 7 | 0 | 2 | 2 | 0 | –– | –– | –– | –– | –– |
| 1973–74 | Mohawk Valley Comets | NAHL | 24 | 1 | 6 | 7 | 15 | –– | –– | –– | –– | –– |
| 1973–74 | Toronto Toros | WHA | 26 | 1 | 4 | 5 | 23 | 1 | 0 | 0 | 0 | 0 |
| 1974–75 | Mohawk Valley Comets | NAHL | 54 | 2 | 10 | 12 | 68 | — | — | — | — | — |
| 1975–76 | Toronto Toros | WHA | 5 | 1 | 0 | 1 | 7 | — | — | — | — | — |
| 1976–77 | Charlotte Checkers | SHL | 5 | 0 | 1 | 1 | 12 | — | — | — | — | — |
| WHA totals | | | 31 | 2 | 4 | 6 | 30 | 1 | 0 | 0 | 0 | 0 |
