= Denis Patry =

Canadian ice hockey player

- Born: December 5, 1953 (age 72) Asbestos, Quebec, Canada
- Height: 5 ft 8 in (173 cm)
- Weight: 165 lb (75 kg; 11 st 11 lb)
- Position: Forward
- Shot: Right
- Played for: WHA; Quebec Nordiques
- NHL draft: 96th overall, 1973; Montreal Canadiens
- WHA draft: 55th overall, 1973; Quebec Nordiques
- Playing career: 1974–1975

Denis Patry (born December 5, 1953) is a Canadian retired ice hockey player who played three games in the World Hockey Association for the Quebec Nordiques.

Patry was born in Asbestos, Quebec and raised in Drummondville, Quebec. He played junior hockey for the Drummondville Rangers from 1969 to 1973. As a youth, he played in the 1965 and 1966, Quebec International Pee-Wee Hockey Tournaments with a minor ice hockey team from Asbestos.

== Career statistics ==
			Regular season					Playoffs
Season	Team	League	GP	G	A	Pts	PIM	GP	G	A	Pts	PIM
1969–70	Drummondville Rangers	QMJHL	56	13	21	34	85	—	—	—	—	—
1970–71	Drummondville Rangers	QMJHL	53	28	31	59	68	6	6	4	10	8
1971–72	Drummondville Rangers	QMJHL	62	55	56	111	100	—	—	—	—	—
1972–73	Drummondville Rangers	QMJHL	61	57	53	110	147	—	—	—	—	—
1973–74	Maine Nordiques	NAHL	58	22	23	45	71	8	2	2	4	12
1974–75	Maine Nordiques	NAHL	74	23	36	59	118	—	—	—	—	—
1974–75	Quebec Nordiques	WHA	3	1	2	3	2	—	—	—	—	—
1975–76	Philadelphia Firebirds	NAHL	71	37	42	79	103	16	16	11	27	25
WHA totals			3	1	2	3	2	—	—	—	—	—
