= Russ Walker (ice hockey) =

Canadian ice hockey player

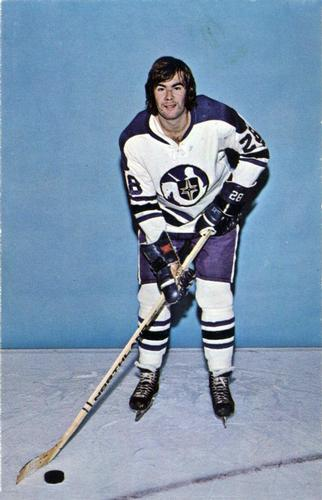
- Born: July 30, 1953 (age 72) Red Deer, Alberta, Canada
- Height: 6 ft 2 in (188 cm)
- Weight: 185 lb (84 kg; 13 st 3 lb)
- Position: Right wing
- Shot: Right
- Played for: Cleveland Crusaders; Los Angeles Kings
- NHL draft: 38th overall, 1973; Los Angeles Kings
- WHA draft: 49th overall, 1973; Cleveland Crusaders
- Playing career: 1973–1979

Russ Walker (born May 24, 1953) is a Canadian former professional ice hockey right winger. He played 3 seasons in the World Hockey Association for the Cleveland Crusaders between 1973 and 1976 and 17 games in the National Hockey League for the Los Angeles Kings between 1976 and 1977.

== Career statistics ==
=== Regular season and playoffs ===
			Regular season					Playoffs
Season	Team	League	GP	G	A	Pts	PIM	GP	G	A	Pts	PIM
1969–70	Red Deer Rustlers	AJHL	1	0	0	0	0	—	—	—	—	—
1969–70	Lethbridge Sugar Kings	AJHL	2	1	0	1	0	—	—	—	—	—
1970–71	Lethbridge Sugar Kings	AJHL	—	—	—	—	—	—	—	—	—	—
1971–72	Saskatoon Blades	WCHL	68	24	28	52	218	8	1	7	8	27
1972–73	Saskatoon Blades	WCHL	65	42	38	80	193	16	9	6	15	65
1973–74	Cleveland Crusaders	WHA	76	15	14	29	117	5	1	0	1	11
1974–75	Cleveland Crusaders	WHA	66	14	11	25	80	5	1	0	1	17
1975–76	Cleveland Crusaders	WHA	72	23	15	38	122	3	0	0	0	18
1976–77	Los Angeles Kings	NHL	16	1	0	1	35	—	—	—	—	—
1976–77	Fort Worth Texans	CHL	53	23	17	40	106	5	1	2	3	9
1977–78	Los Angeles Kings	NHL	1	0	0	0	6	—	—	—	—	—
1977–78	Springfield Indians	AHL	77	30	36	66	79	4	2	0	2	0
1978–79	Springfield Indians	AHL	61	23	19	42	88	—	—	—	—	—
WHA totals			214	52	40	92	319	13	2	0	2	46
NHL totals			17	1	0	1	41	—	—	—	—	—
