= Tom Colley =

Canadian ice hockey centre (1953–2021)

- Born: August 21, 1953; Toronto, Ontario, Canada
- Died: November 17, 2021 (aged 68); Owen Sound, Ontario, Canada
- Height: 5 ft 9 in (175 cm)
- Weight: 162 lb (73 kg; 11 st 8 lb)
- Position: Centre
- Shot: Left
- Played for: Minnesota North Stars
- NHL draft: 57th overall, 1973; Minnesota North Stars
- WHA draft: 38th overall, 1973; New England Whalers
- Playing career: 1973–1986

Thomas Lewis Colley (August 21, 1953 – November 17, 2021) was a Canadian professional ice hockey centre. He played one game in the National Hockey League, with the Minnesota North Stars on March 12, 1975. The rest of his career, which lasted from 1973 to 1986, was spent in the minor leagues. Colley's son, Kevin, also played in the NHL.

== Playing career ==
As a youth, Colley played in the 1966 Quebec International Pee-Wee Hockey Tournament with the Toronto Weston minor ice hockey team.

Born in Toronto, Ontario, Colley played junior hockey for the Niagara Falls Flyers and the Sudbury Wolves, scoring 117 points, including 81 assists. Colley was drafted 57th overall by the Minnesota North Stars in the 1973 NHL Amateur Draft and 38th overall by the New England Whalers in the 1973 WHA Amateur Draft. Like most WHA draftees, Colley chose to report to the NHL and signed with the North Stars, playing one game for the North Stars during the 1974-75 NHL season. He was assigned to the New Haven Nighthawks of the American Hockey League and spent a total of seven seasons with the team, helping them to two division titles in 1979 and 1980 as well as the regular season title in 1980. He also made the Calder Cup finals three times with the Nighthawks, in 1975, losing to the Springfield Indians, and in 1978 and 1979, losing to the Maine Mariners on both occasions. He is the Nighthawks' all-time leader in goals (204), assists (281), points (485), and games (534).

In 1980, Colley spent a season with the Binghamton Whalers before spending the next five seasons playing senior hockey for the Collingwood Royals. He retired as a player in 1986. Colley died on November 17, 2021.

== Career statistics ==
=== Regular season and playoffs ===
			Regular season					Playoffs
Season	Team	League	GP	G	A	Pts	PIM	GP	G	A	Pts	PIM
1970–71	Weston Dodgers	MetJBHL	—	52	51	103	—	—	—	—	—	—
1971–72	Niagara Falls Flyers	OHA	63	23	22	45	53	6	3	1	4	14
1972–73	Sudbury Wolves	OHA	67	36	81	117	84	4	0	2	2	0
1973–74	New Haven Nighthawks	AHL	66	9	18	27	28	10	2	2	4	4
1974–75	Minnesota North Stars	NHL	1	0	0	0	2	—	—	—	—	—
1974–75	New Haven Nighthawks	AHL	76	29	47	76	51	16	6	12	18	8
1975–76	New Haven Nighthawks	AHL	76	38	31	69	35	3	0	1	1	0
1976–77	New Haven Nighthawks	AHL	80	37	56	93	36	6	2	2	4	0
1977–78	New Haven Nighthawks	AHL	80	32	54	86	17	15	2	6	8	2
1978–79	New Haven Nighthawks	AHL	77	36	32	68	24	10	3	9	12	2
1979–80	New Haven Nighthawks	AHL	79	23	43	66	43	7	0	4	4	4
1980–81	Binghamton Whalers	AHL	74	17	33	50	31	6	4	3	7	2
1981–82	Collingwood Shipbuilders	OHA Int	30	21	42	63	—	—	—	—	—	—
1982–83	Collingwood Shipbuilders	OHA Sr	30	22	36	58	—	—	—	—	—	—
1983–84	Collingwood Shipbuilders	OHA Sr	37	40	53	93	—	—	—	—	—	—
1984–85	Collingwood Shipbuilders	OHA Sr	—	20	48	68	—	—	—	—	—	—
1985–86	Collingwood Shipbuilders	OHA Sr	36	21	34	55	—	—	—	—	—	—
AHL totals			608	221	314	535	265	73	19	39	58	22
NHL totals			1	0	0	0	2	—	—	—	—	—

== See also ==
- List of players who played only one game in the NHL
