= Jimmy Jones (ice hockey) =

Canadian ice hockey player

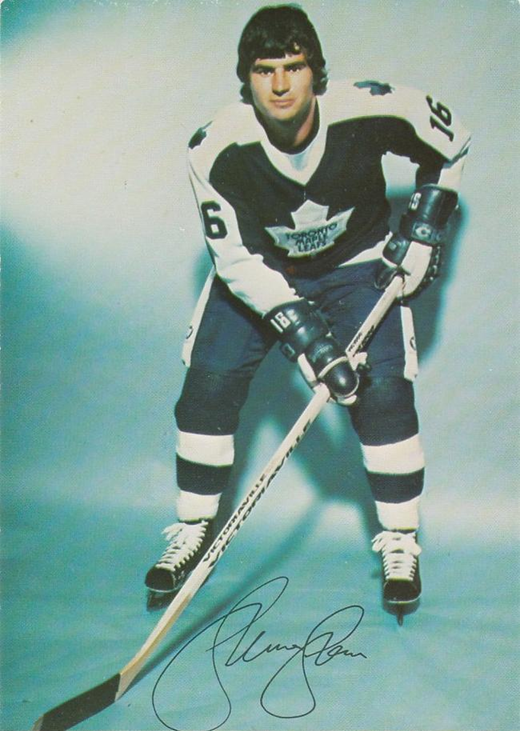
- Jones in 1979 postcard
- Born: January 2, 1953 (age 73) Woodbridge, Ontario, Canada
- Height: 5 ft 9 in (175 cm)
- Weight: 180 lb (82 kg; 12 st 12 lb)
- Position: Right Wing
- Shot: Right
- Played for: Toronto Maple Leafs; Vancouver Blazers
- NHL draft: 31st overall, 1973; Boston Bruins
- WHA draft: 57th overall, 1973; Vancouver Blazers
- Playing career: 1973–1981

James Harrison Jones (born January 2, 1953) is a Canadian former professional ice hockey player. He played for the Toronto Maple Leafs of the National Hockey League between 1977 and 1979. He also played for the Vancouver Blazers of the World Hockey Association between 1973 and 1975.

== Playing career ==
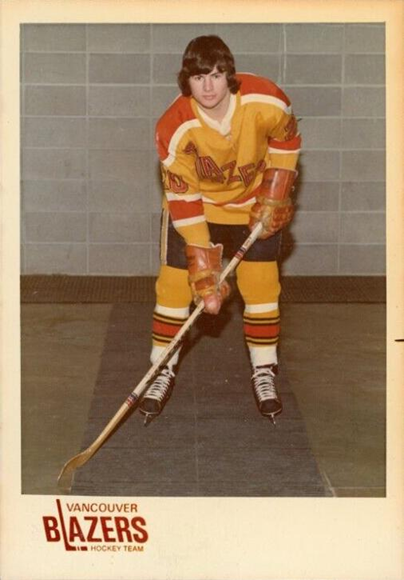
1974 photo of Jones for Vancouver Blazers of the WHA

Jones was drafted by the Boston Bruins in the 1973 NHL Amateur Draft, as well as the Vancouver Blazers in the 1973 WHA Amateur Draft. He began his professional career with the Blazers the following season. After playing parts of two seasons with the Blazers he signed a contract with the American Hockey League's Rochester Americans.

He played in the National Hockey League for the first time in 1977, after signing a contract with the Toronto Maple Leafs on October 25. He played two seasons on the Maple Leafs' checking line with Jerry Butler and Pat Boutette.

He returned to the Americans in 1980, playing one final season before retiring in 1981.

== Career statistics ==
=== Regular season and playoffs ===
			Regular season					Playoffs
Season	Team	League	GP	G	A	Pts	PIM	GP	G	A	Pts	PIM
1968–69	St. Catharines Falcons	NDJBHL	—	—	—	—	—	—	—	—	—	—
1969–70	Sarnia Legionnaires	WOJAHL	—	—	—	—	—	—	—	—	—	—
1970–71	Peterborough Petes	OHA	11	0	2	2	2	—	—	—	—	—
1971–72	Peterborough Petes	OHA	4	1	2	3	8	—	—	—	—	—
1972–73	Peterborough Petes	OHA	63	37	33	70	73	13	11	6	17	38
1973–74	Vancouver Blazers	WHA	18	3	2	5	23	—	—	—	—	—
1973–74	Roanoke Valley Rebels	SHL	60	24	38	62	97	—	—	—	—	—
1974–75	Vancouver Blazers	WHA	63	11	7	18	39	—	—	—	—	—
1974–75	Tulsa Oilers	CHL	9	6	7	13	17	—	—	—	—	—
1975–76	Rochester Americans	AHL	66	16	22	38	71	7	1	0	1	11
1976–77	Rochester Americans	AHL	74	24	24	48	66	—	—	—	—	—
1977–78	Toronto Maple Leafs	NHL	78	4	9	13	23	13	1	5	6	7
1978–79	Toronto Maple Leafs	NHL	69	9	9	18	45	6	0	0	0	4
1979–80	Toronto Maple Leafs	NHL	1	0	0	0	0	—	—	—	—	—
1979–80	New Brunswick Hawks	AHL	48	17	17	34	31	—	—	—	—	—
1980–81	Rochester Americans	AHL	73	13	15	28	83	—	—	—	—	—
WHA totals			81	14	9	23	62	—	—	—	—	—
NHL totals			148	13	18	31	68	19	1	5	6	11
