= 1973 NHL amateur draft =

1973 North American ice hockey draft

General information
- Date: May 15, 1973
- Location: Mount Royal Hotel; Montreal, Quebec, Canada

Overview
- 168 total selections in 13 rounds
- First selection: (Canada) Denis Potvin (New York Islanders)
- Hall of Famers: 3: D Denis Potvin; RW Lanny McDonald; LW Bob Gainey

The 1973 NHL amateur draft was the 11th draft for the National Hockey League. It was the first to be held on a separate day from other league activities on May 15, 1973, at the Mount Royal Hotel in Montreal, so it would not overshadow the rest of the league meetings. Previously, the league had held the amateur draft in mid-June. It also marks the second time the meeting took place at the Mount Royal Hotel rather than the Queen Elizabeth Hotel.

Eligible for the draft were all amateur players born before January 1, 1954. The NHL paid a lump sum to the Canadian Amateur Hockey Association to support major junior hockey as a group. Teams could offer a player a contract at any time after the draft without risking re-entry in a future NHL draft.

The last active players in the NHL from this draft class were Bob Gainey and Lanny McDonald, who both retired after the 1988–89 season.

== Selections by round ==
Below are listed the selections in the 1973 NHL amateur draft.

= NHL All-Star team ·	= NHL All-Star (Note: Players are identified as an All-Star if they were selected for the All-Star game at any time in their career.) ·	= NHL All-Star and NHL All-Star team ·	= Hall of Famers

=== Round one ===
#	Player	Nationality	NHL team	College/junior/club team
1	Denis Potvin (D)	Canada	New York Islanders	Ottawa 67's (OHA)
2	Tom Lysiak (C)	Canada	Atlanta Flames (from Montreal via California)^{1}	Medicine Hat Tigers (WCHL)
3	Dennis Ververgaert (RW)	Canada	Vancouver Canucks	London Knights (OHA)
4	Lanny McDonald (RW)	Canada	Toronto Maple Leafs	Medicine Hat Tigers (WCHL)
5	John Davidson (G)	Canada	St. Louis Blues (from Montreal via Atlanta)^{2}	Calgary Centennials (WCHL)
6	Andre Savard (C)	Canada	Boston Bruins (from Los Angeles)^{3}	Quebec Remparts (QMJHL)
7	Blaine Stoughton (RW)	Canada	Pittsburgh Penguins	Flin Flon Bombers (WCHL)
8	Bob Gainey (LW)	Canada	Montreal Canadiens (from St. Louis)^{4}	Peterborough Petes (OHA)
9	Bob Dailey (D)	Canada	Vancouver Canucks (from Montreal via Minnesota)^{5}	Toronto Marlboros (OHA)
10	Bob Neely (D)	Canada	Toronto Maple Leafs (from Philadelphia)^{6}	Peterborough Petes (OHA)
11	Terry Richardson (G)	Canada	Detroit Red Wings	New Westminster Bruins (WCHL)
12	Morris Titanic (LW)	Canada	Buffalo Sabres	Sudbury Wolves (OHA)
13	Darcy Rota (LW)	Canada	Chicago Black Hawks	Edmonton Oil Kings (WCHL)
14	Rick Middleton (RW)	Canada	New York Rangers	Oshawa Generals (OHA)
15	Ian Turnbull (D)	Canada	Toronto Maple Leafs (from Boston)^{7}	Ottawa 67's (OHA)
16	Vic Mercredi (C)	Canada	Atlanta Flames (from Montreal)^{8}	New Westminster Bruins (WCHL)

1. The Montreal Canadiens' first-round pick went to the Atlanta Flames as the result of a trade on May 15, 1973, that sent Montreal's two first-round picks and second-round pick in 1973 NHL Amateur Draft to Atlanta in exchange for Atlanta's first-round pick in 1973 NHL Amateur Draft, first-round pick in 1977 NHL amateur draft and second-round pick in 1978 NHL amateur draft.
  Montreal previously acquired this pick as the result of a trade on June 8, 1972, that sent Montreal's second-round pick in 1972 NHL amateur draft (Stan Weir) to California in exchange for California's first-round and second-round picks in 1973 NHL Amateur Draft as settlement of waiver draft payment owed from California to Montreal for California selecting Carol Vadnais in the 1968 intra-league draft.
2. The Montreal Canadiens' first-round pick went to the St. Louis Blues as the result of a trade on May 15, 1973, that sent St. Louis' first-round and fourth-round pick in 1973 NHL Amateur Draft and first-round pick in 1975 NHL amateur draft in exchange for Montreal's third-round pick in 1973 NHL Amateur Draft and this pick.
  The Montreal previously acquired this pick as the result of a trade on May 15, 1973, that sent Montreal's two first-round picks (#2 - Tom Lysiak) and second-round pick in 1973 NHL Amateur Draft to Atlanta in exchange for Atlanta's first-round pick in 1973 NHL Amateur Draft, first-round pick in 1977 NHL amateur draft and second-round pick in 1978 NHL amateur draft.
3. The Los Angeles Kings' first-round pick went to the Boston Bruins as the result of a trade on May 14, 1969, that sent Ross Lonsberry and Eddie Shack to Los Angeles in exchange for Los Angeles' first round pick in 1973, Ken Turlik and this pick.
4. The St. Louis Blues' first-round pick went to the Montreal Canadiens as the result of a trade on May 15, 1973, that sent Montreal's first-round pick (John Davidson) and third-round pick in 1973 NHL Amateur Draft to St. Louis in exchange for St. Louis' fourth-round pick in 1973 NHL Amateur Draft, first-round pick in 1975 NHL amateur draft and this pick.
5. The Montreal Canadiens' first-round pick went to the Vancouver Canucks as the result of a trade on May 15, 1973, that sent Vancouver's first-round pick in 1974 NHL amateur draft in exchange for this pick.
  The Canadiens previously acquired this pick as the result of a trade on June 10, 1968, that sent Minnesota's first-round pick (Dave Gardner) in 1972 NHL amateur draft, a player to be named later (Andre Pronovost) and this pick to Montreal in exchange for Danny Grant, Claude Larose and future considerations (Bob Murdoch on May 25, 1971).
6. The Philadelphia Flyers' first-round pick went to the Toronto Maple Leafs as the result of a trade on May 15, 1973, that sent Toronto's second-round pick in 1973 and the rights to Bernie Parent to Philadelphia in exchange for future considerations (Doug Favell) and this pick.
7. The Boston Bruins' first-round pick went to the Toronto Maple Leafs as the result of a trade on March 3, 1973, that sent Jacques Plante and Toronto's third-round pick in 1973 NHL Amateur Draft in exchange for future considerations (Eddie Johnston) and this pick.
8. The Montreal Canadiens' first-round pick went to the Atlanta Flames as the result of a trade on May 15, 1973, that sent Montreal's two first-round picks (#2 - Tom Lysiak) and second-round pick in 1973 NHL Amateur Draft to Atlanta in exchange for Atlanta's first-round pick in 1973 NHL Amateur Draft (#5 - STL - John Davidson), first-round pick in 1977 NHL amateur draft and second-round pick in 1978 NHL amateur draft.

=== Round two ===
#	Player	Nationality	NHL team	College/junior/club team
17	Glenn Goldup (RW)	Canada	Montreal Canadiens (from the Islanders)^{1}	Toronto Marlboros (OHA)
18	Blake Dunlop (C)	Canada	Minnesota North Stars (from California via Montreal)^{2}	Ottawa 67's (OHA)
19	Paulin Bordeleau (RW)	Canada	Vancouver Canucks	Toronto Marlboros (OHA)
20	Larry Goodenough (D)	Canada	Philadelphia Flyers (from the Toronto)^{3}	London Knights (OHA)
21	Eric Vail (LW)	Canada	Atlanta Flames (from Montreal via Atlanta)^{4}	Sudbury Wolves (OHA)
22	Peter Marrin (C)	Canada	Montreal Canadiens (from Los Angeles)^{5}	Toronto Marlboros (OHA)
23	Wayne Bianchin (LW)	Canada	Pittsburgh Penguins	Flin Flon Bombers (WCHL)
24	George Pesut (D)	Canada	St. Louis Blues	Saskatoon Blades (WCHL)
25	John Rogers (RW)	Canada	Minnesota North Stars	Edmonton Oil Kings (WCHL)
26	Brent Leavins (LW)	Canada	Philadelphia Flyers	Swift Current Broncos (WCHL)
27	Colin Campbell (D)	Canada	Pittsburgh Penguins	Peterborough Petes (OHA)
28	Jean Landry (D)	Canada	Buffalo Sabres	Quebec Remparts (QMJHL)
29	Reg Thomas (LW)	Canada	Chicago Black Hawks	London Knights (OHA)
30	Pat Hickey (LW)	Canada	New York Rangers	Hamilton Red Wings (OHA)
31	Jimmy Jones (RW)	Canada	Boston Bruins	Peterborough Petes (OHA)
32	Ron Andruff (C)	Canada	Montreal Canadiens	Flin Flon Bombers (WCHL)

1. The New York Islanders' second-round pick went to the Montreal Canadiens as the result of a trade on June 6, 1972, that sent Alex Campbell, Denis DeJordy, Glenn Resch and future considerations (Germain Gagnon) to the Islanders in exchange for cash and this pick.
2. The Montreal Canadiens' second-round pick went to the Minnesota North Stars as the result of a trade on May 15, 1973, that sent Minnesota's second-round pick in 1975 NHL amateur draft in exchange for this pick.
  Montreal previously acquired this pick as the result of a trade on June 8, 1972, that sent Montreal's second-round pick (Stan Weir) in 1972 NHL amateur draft to California in exchange for California's first-round (ATL - Tom Lysiak) in 1973 NHL Amateur Draft and this pick as settlement of waiver draft payment owed from California to Montreal for California selecting Carol Vadnais in the 1968 intra-league draft.
3. The Toronto Maple Leafs' second-round pick went to the Philadelphia Flyers as the result of a trade on May 15, 1973, that sent Philadelphia's first-round pick (Bob Neely) in 1973 NHL Amateur Draft and future considerations (Doug Favell) to Toronto in exchange for the rights to Bernie Parent and this pick.
4. The Montreal Canadiens' second-round pick went to the Atlanta Flames as the result of a trade on May 15, 1973, that sent Atlanta's first-round pick (#5 - STL - John Davidson) in the 1973 NHL Amateur Draft, first-round pick in the 1977 NHL amateur draft and second-round pick in the 1978 NHL amateur draft to Montreal in exchange for Montreal's two first-round picks (#2 - Tom Lysiak and #16 - Vic Mercredi) in the 1973 NHL Amateur Draft and this pick.
  Montreal previously acquired this pick as the result of a trade on June 16, 1972, that sent Rey Comeau and Lynn Powis to Atlanta for cash and this pick.
5. The Los Angeles Kings' second-round pick went to the Montreal Canadiens as the result of a trade on January 26, 1971, that sent Ralph Backstrom to Los Angeles in exchange for Ray Fortin, Gord Labossiere and this pick.

=== Round three ===
#	Player	Nationality	NHL team	College/junior/club team
33	Dave Lewis (D)	Canada	New York Islanders	Saskatoon Blades (WCHL)
34	Jeff Jacques (C)	Canada	California Golden Seals	St. Catharines Black Hawks (OHA)
35	Paul Sheard (RW)	United Kingdom; Canada	Vancouver Canucks	Ottawa 67's (OHA)
36	Doug Gibson (C)	Canada	Boston Bruins (from Toronto)^{1}	Peterborough Petes (OHA)
37	Ed Humphreys (G)	Canada	Montreal Canadiens (from Atlanta)^{2}	Saskatoon Blades (WCHL)
38	Russ Walker (RW)	Canada	Los Angeles Kings	Saskatoon Blades (WCHL)
39	Nelson Pyatt (C)	Canada	Detroit Red Wings (from Pittsburgh)^{3}	Oshawa Generals (OHA)
40	Bob Stumpf (RW)	Canada	Philadelphia Flyers (from St. Louis)^{4}	New Westminster Bruins (WCHL)
41	Rick Chinnick (RW)	Canada	Minnesota North Stars	Peterborough Petes (OHA)
42	Mike Clarke (C)	Canada	Philadelphia Flyers	Calgary Centennials (WCHL)
43	Robbie Neale (C)	Canada	Detroit Red Wings	Brandon Wheat Kings(WCHL)
44	Andre Deschamps (LW)	Canada	Buffalo Sabres	Quebec Remparts (QMJHL)
45	Randy Holt (D)	Canada	Chicago Black Hawks	Sudbury Wolves (OHA)
46	John Campbell (LW)	Canada	New York Rangers	Sault Ste. Marie Greyhounds (OHA)
47	Al Sims (D)	Canada	Boston Bruins	Cornwall Royals (QMJHL)
48	Bob Gassoff (D)	Canada	St. Louis Blues (from Montreal)^{5}	Medicine Hat Tigers (WCHL)

1. The Toronto Maple Leafs' third-round pick went to the Boston Bruins as the result of a trade on March 3, 1973, that sent Boston's first-round pick in 1973 NHL Amateur Draft (Ian Turnbull) and future considerations (Eddie Johnston) to Toronto in exchange for Jacques Plante and this pick.
2. The Atlanta Flames' third-round pick went to the Montreal Canadiens as the result of a trade on August 10, 1972, that sent Noel Price to Atlanta in exchange for cash and this pick.
3. The Pittsburgh Penguins' third-round pick went to the Detroit Red Wings as the result of a trade on February 25, 1973, that sent Andy Brown to Pittsburgh in exchange for cash and this pick.
4. The St. Louis Blues' third-round pick went to the Philadelphia Flyers as the result of a trade on December 14, 1972, that sent Brent Hughes and Pierre Plante to St. Louis in exchange for Andre Dupont and this pick.
5. The Montreal Canadiens' third-round pick went to the St. Louis Blues as the result of a trade on May 15, 1973, that sent St. Louis' first-round pick (Bob Gainey) and fourth-round pick in 1973 NHL Amateur Draft and first-round pick in 1975 NHL amateur draft to Montreal in exchange for Montreal's first-round pick (John Davidson) in 1973 NHL Amateur Draft and this pick.

=== Round four ===
#	Player	Nationality	NHL team	College/junior/club team
49	Andre St. Laurent (C)	Canada	New York Islanders	Montreal Junior Canadiens (QMJHL)
50	Ron Serafini (D)	United States	California Golden Seals	St. Catharines Black Hawks (OHA)
51	Keith Mackie (D)	United Kingdom; Canada	Vancouver Canucks	Edmonton Oil Kings (WCHL)
52	Frank Rochon (LW)	Canada	Toronto Maple Leafs	Sherbrooke Castors (QMJHL)
53	Dean Talafous (C)	United States	Atlanta Flames	University of Wisconsin (NCAA)
54	Jim McCrimmon (D)	Canada	Los Angeles Kings	Medicine Hat Tigers (WCHL)
55	Dennis Owchar (D)	Canada	Pittsburgh Penguins	Toronto Marlboros (OHA)
56	Alan Hangsleben (D)	United States	Montreal Canadiens (from St. Louis)^{1}	University of North Dakota (NCAA)
57	Tom Colley (C)	Canada	Minnesota North Stars	Sudbury Wolves (OHA)
58	Dale Cook (LW)	Canada	Philadelphia Flyers	Victoria Cougars (WCHL)
59	Mike Korney (D)	Canada	Detroit Red Wings	Winnipeg Jets (WCHL)
60	Yvon Dupuis (RW)	Canada	Buffalo Sabres	Quebec Remparts (QMJHL)
61	Dave Elliott (LW)	Canada	Chicago Black Hawks	Winnipeg Jets (WCHL)
62	Brian Molvik (D)	Canada	New York Rangers	Calgary Centennials (WCHL)
63	Steve Langdon (LW)	Canada	Boston Bruins	London Knights (OHA)
64	Richard Latulippe (C)	Canada	Montreal Canadiens	Quebec Remparts (QMJHL)

1. The St. Louis Blues' fourth-round pick went to the Montreal Canadiens as the result of a trade on May 15, 1973, that sent Montreal's first-round pick (John Davidson) and third-round pick (Bob Gassoff) in 1973 NHL Amateur Draft to St. Louis in exchange for St. Louis' first-round pick (Bob Gainey) in 1973 NHL Amateur Draft, first-round pick in 1975 NHL amateur draft and this pick.

=== Round five ===
#	Player	Nationality	NHL team	College/junior/club team
65	Ron Kennedy (RW)	Canada	New York Islanders	New Westminster Bruins (WCHL)
66	Jim Moxey (RW)	Canada	California Golden Seals	Hamilton Red Wings (OHA)
67	Paul O'Neil (C)	United States	Vancouver Canucks	Boston University (NCAA)
68	Gord Titcomb (LW)	Canada	Toronto Maple Leafs	St. Catharines Black Hawks (OHA)
69	John Flesch (LW)	Canada	Atlanta Flames	Lake Superior State University (NCAA)
70	Dennis Abgrall (RW)	Canada	Los Angeles Kings	Saskatoon Blades (WCHL)
71	Guido Tenesi (D)	United States	Pittsburgh Penguins	Oshawa Generals (OHA)
72	Bill Laing (C)	Canada	St. Louis Blues	Saskatoon Blades (WCHL)
73	Lowell Ostlund (D)	Canada	Minnesota North Stars	Saskatoon Blades (WCHL)
74	Michel Latreille (D)	Canada	Philadelphia Flyers	Montreal Junior Canadiens (QMJHL)
75	Blair Stewart (F)	Canada	Detroit Red Wings	Winnipeg Jets (WCHL)
76	Bob Smulders (RW)	Canada	Buffalo Sabres	Peterborough Petes (OHA)
77	Dan Hinton (LW)	Canada	Chicago Black Hawks	Sault Ste. Marie Greyhounds (OHA)
78	Pierre Laganiere (RW)	Canada	New York Rangers	Sherbrooke Castors (QMJHL)
79	Peter Crosbie (G)	Canada	Boston Bruins	London Knights (OHA)
80	Gerard Gibbons (D)	Canada	Montreal Canadiens	St. Mary's University (CIAU)

=== Round six ===
#	Player	Nationality	NHL team	College/junior/club team
81	Keith Smith (D)	Canada	New York Islanders	Brown University (ECAC)
82	Willie Trognitz (LW)	Canada	California Golden Seals	Thunder Bay Vulcans (TBJHL)
83	Jim Cowell (C)	Canada	Vancouver Canucks	Ottawa 67's (OHA)
84	Doug Marit (D)	Canada	Toronto Maple Leafs	Regina Pats (WCHL)
85	Ken Houston (D)	Canada	Atlanta Flames	Chatham Maroons SOJHL
86	Blair MacDonald (RW)	Canada	Los Angeles Kings	Cornwall Royals (QMJHL)
87	Don Seiling (LW)	Canada	Pittsburgh Penguins	Oshawa Generals (OHA)
88	Randy Smith (LW)	Canada	St. Louis Blues	Edmonton Oil Kings (WCHL)
89	David Lee (LW)	United Kingdom; Canada	Minnesota North Stars	Ottawa 67's (OHA)
90	Doug Ferguson (D)	Canada	Philadelphia Flyers	Hamilton Red Wings (OHA)
91	Glen Cickello (D)	Canada	Detroit Red Wings	Hamilton Red Wings (OHA)
92	Neil Korzack (LW)	Canada	Buffalo Sabres	Peterborough Petes (OHA)
93	Garry Doerksen (C)	Canada	Chicago Black Hawks	Winnipeg Jets (WCHL)
94	Dwayne Pentland (D)	Canada	New York Rangers	Brandon Wheat Kings (WCHL)
95	Jean-Pierre Burgoyne (D)	Canada	Boston Bruins	Shawinigan Dynamos (QMJHL)
96	Denis Patry (RW)	Canada	Montreal Canadiens	Drummondville Rangers (QMJHL)

=== Round seven ===
#	Player	Nationality	NHL team	College/junior/club team
97	Don Cutts (G)	Canada	New York Islanders	Rensselaer Polytechnic Institute (NCAA)
98	Paul Tantardini (LW)	Canada	California Golden Seals	Downsview Bombers (OPJHL)
99	Clay Hebenton (G)	Canada	Vancouver Canucks	Portland Winter Hawks WCJHL
100	Dan Follet (G)	Canada	Toronto Maple Leafs	Downsview Bombers (OPJHL)
101	Tom Machowski (D)	United States	Atlanta Flames	University of Wisconsin (NCAA)
102	Roly Kimble (G)	Canada	Los Angeles Kings	Hamilton Red Wings (OHA)
103	Terry Ewasiuk (LW)	Canada	Pittsburgh Penguins	Victoria Cougars (WCHL)
104	John Wensink (LW)	Canada	St. Louis Blues	Cornwall Royals (QMJHL)
105	Lou Nistico (C)	Canada	Minnesota North Stars	London Knights (OHA)
106	Tom Young (D)	Canada	Philadelphia Flyers	Sudbury Wolves (OHA)
107	Brian Middleton (D)	Canada	Detroit Red Wings	University of Alberta (CIAU)
108	Bob Young (D)	United States	Buffalo Sabres	University of Denver (NCAA)
109	Wayne Dye (LW)	Canada	Chicago Black Hawks	New Westminster Bruins (WCHL)
110	Denis Anderson (D)	Canada	New York Islanders (from the Rangers)^{1}	New Westminster Bruins (WCHL)
111	Walter Johnson (RW)	United States	Boston Bruins	Oshawa Generals (OHA)
112	Michel Belisle (C)	Canada	Montreal Canadiens	Montreal Junior Canadiens (QMJHL)

1. The New York Rangers' seventh-round pick went to the New York Islanders as the result of a trade on June 6, 1972, that the Islanders' promised to not take certain players in the 1972 NHL expansion draft in exchange for Rangers' eight-round pick in the 1973 NHL Amateur Draft and this pick.

=== Round eight ===
#	Player	Nationality	NHL team	College/junior/club team
113	Mike Kennedy (RW)	Canada	New York Islanders	Kitchener Rangers (OHA)
114	Bruce Greig (LW)	Canada	California Golden Seals	Vancouver Nats (WCHL)
115	John Senkpiel (LW)	Canada	Vancouver Canucks	Vancouver Nats (WCHL)
116	Les Burgess (LW)	Canada	Toronto Maple Leafs	Kitchener Rangers (OHA)
117	Bob Law (RW)	Canada	Atlanta Flames	University of North Dakota (WCHA)
118	Dennis Polonich (C)	Canada	Detroit Red Wings (from Los Angeles)^{1}	Flin Flon Bombers (WCHL)
119	Fred Comrie (C)	Canada	Pittsburgh Penguins	Edmonton Oil Kings(WCHL)
120	Jean Tetreault (LW)	Canada	St. Louis Blues	Drummondville Rangers (QMJHL)
121	George Beveridge (D)	Canada	Minnesota North Stars	Kitchener Rangers (OHA)
122	Norm Barnes (D)	Canada	Philadelphia Flyers	Michigan State University (NCAA)
123	George Lyle (LW)	Canada	Detroit Red Wings	Michigan Technological University (NCAA)
124	Tim O'Connell (RW)	United States	Buffalo Sabres	University of Vermont (NCAA)
125	Jim Koleff (C)	Canada	Chicago Black Hawks	Hamilton Red Wings (OHA)
126	Denis Desgagnes (C)	Canada	New York Islanders (from the Rangers)^{2}	Sorel Eperviers (QMJHL)
127	Virgil Gates (D)	Canada	Boston Bruins	Swift Current Broncos (WCHL)
128	Mario Desjardins (LW)	Canada	Montreal Canadiens	Sherbrooke Castors (QMJHL)

1. The Los Angeles Kings' eighth-round pick went to the Detroit Red Wings as the result of a trade on May 15, 1973, that sent cash to Los Angeles in exchange for this pick.
2. The New York Rangers' seventh-round pick went to the New York Islanders as the result of a trade on June 6, 1972, that sent the Islanders' promised to not take certain players in the 1972 NHL expansion draft in exchange for Rangers' seventh-round pick in the 1973 NHL Amateur Draft (Denis Andersen) and this pick.

=== Round nine ===
#	Player	Nationality	NHL team	College/junior/club team
129	Bob Lorimer (D)	Canada	New York Islanders	Michigan Technological University (NCAA)
130	Larry Patey (C)	Canada	California Golden Seals	Braintree Hawks (NEJHL)
131	Peter Folco (D)	Canada	Vancouver Canucks	Quebec Remparts (QMJHL)
132	Dave Pay (LW)	Canada	Toronto Maple Leafs	University of Wisconsin (NCAA)
133	Bob Bilodeau (D)	Canada	Atlanta Flames	New Westminster Bruins (WCHL)
134	Gord Lane (D)	Canada	Pittsburgh Penguins	New Westminster Bruins (WCHL)
135	Dennis O'Brien (D)	Canada	Detroit Red Wings (from St. Louis)^{1}	Laurentian University (CIAU)
136	Jim Johnston (C)	Canada	Minnesota North Stars	Peterborough Petes (OHA)
137	Dan O'Donohue (D)	Canada	Philadelphia Flyers	Sault Ste. Marie Greyhounds (OHA)
138	Tom Newman (D)	Canada	Detroit Red Wings	Kitchener Rangers (OHA)
139	Ray Bibeau (D)	Canada	Detroit Red Wings (from Buffalo)^{2}	Montreal Junior Canadiens (QMJHL)
140	Jack Johnson (D)	United States	Chicago Black Hawks	University of Wisconsin (NCAA)
141	Steve Alley (LW)	United States	Chicago Black Hawks (from the Rangers)^{3}	University of Wisconsin (NCAA)
142	Jim Pettie (G)	Canada	Boston Bruins	St. Catharines Black Hawks (OHA)
143	Bob Wright (RW)	Canada	Montreal Canadiens	Pembroke Lumber Kings (CJAHL)

1. The St. Louis Blues' ninth-round pick went to the Detroit Red Wings as the result of a trade on May 15, 1973, that sent cash to St. Louis in exchange for St. Louis' tenth-round pick in 1973 NHL Amateur Draft and this pick.
2. The Buffalo Sabres' ninth-round pick went to the Detroit Red Wings as the result of a trade on May 15, 1973, that sent cash to Buffalo in exchange for Buffalo's tenth-round pick, eleventh-round pick in 1973 NHL Amateur Draft and this pick.
3. The New York Rangers' ninth-round pick went to the Chicago Blackhawks as the result of a trade on May 15, 1973, that sent cash to the Rangers in exchange for this pick.

=== Round ten ===
#	Player	Nationality	NHL team	College/junior/club team
144	Lee Palmer (D)	Canada	Toronto Maple Leafs (from the Islanders)^{1}	Clarkson University (NCAA)
145	Doug Mahood (RW)	Canada	California Golden Seals	Sault Ste. Marie Greyhounds (OHA)
146	Terry McDougall (C)	Canada	Vancouver Canucks	Swift Current Broncos (WCHL)
147	Bob Peace (C)	Canada	Toronto Maple Leafs	Cornell University (NCAA)
148	Glen Surbey (D)	Canada	Atlanta Flames	Loyola College (CIAU)
149	Guy Ross (D)	Canada	Atlanta Flames (from Los Angeles)^{2}	Sherbrooke Castors (QMJHL)
150	Randy Aimoe (D)	Canada	Pittsburgh Penguins	Medicine Hat Tigers (WCHL)
151	Kevin Neville (G)	Canada	Detroit Red Wings (from St. Louis)^{3}	Toronto Marlboros (OHA)
152	Sam Clegg (G)	Canada	Minnesota North Stars	Medicine Hat Tigers (WCHL)
153	Brian Dick (RW)	Canada	Philadelphia Flyers	Winnipeg Jets (WCHL)
154	Ken Gibb (D)	Canada	Detroit Red Wings	University of North Dakota (NCAA)
155	Mitch Brandt (D)	United States	Detroit Red Wings (from Buffalo)^{4}	University of Denver (NCAA)
156	Rick Clubbe (C)	Canada	Chicago Black Hawks	University of North Dakota (NCAA)
157	Yvan Bouillon (C)	Canada	Boston Bruins	Cornwall Royals (QMJHL)
158	Alain Labrecque (C)	Canada	Montreal Canadiens	Trois-Rivieres Draveurs (QMJHL)

1. The New York Islanders' tenth-round pick went to the Toronto Maple Leafs as the result of a trade on May 15, 1973, that sent cash to the Islanders in exchange for the Islanders' eleventh-round pick in 1973 NHL Amateur Draft and this pick.
2. The Los Angeles Kings' tenth-round pick went to the Atlanta Flames as the result of a trade on June 6, 1972, that the Flames' promised to not take certain players in the 1972 NHL expansion draft in exchange for Los Angeles' ninth-round pick in the 1972 NHL amateur draft (Jean Lamarre) and this pick.
3. The St. Louis Blues' tenth-round pick went to the Detroit Red Wings as the result of a trade on May 15, 1973, that sent cash to St. Louis in exchange for St. Louis' ninth-round pick (Dennis O'Brien) in 1973 NHL Amateur Draft and this pick.
4. The Buffalo Sabres' tenth-round pick went to the Detroit Red Wings as the result of a trade on May 15, 1973, that sent cash to Buffalo in exchange for Buffalo's ninth-round (Ray Bibeau), eleventh-round pick in 1973 NHL Amateur Draft and this pick.

=== Round eleven ===
#	Player	Nationality	NHL team	College/junior/club team
159	Norm McLeod (LW)	Canada	Toronto Maple Leafs (from the Islanders)^{1}	Ottawa M&W Rangers (CJHL)
160	Angie Moretto (C)	Canada	California Golden Seals	University of Michigan (NCAA)
161	Russ Wiechnik (C)	Canada	Minnesota North Stars (from Toronto)^{2}	Calgary Centennials (WCHL)
162	Greg Fox (D)	Canada	Atlanta Flames	University of Michigan (WCHA)
163	Max Hansen (LW)	United States	Minnesota North Stars (from Los Angeles)^{3}	Sudbury Wolves (OHA)
164	Don McLeod (C)	Canada	Pittsburgh Penguins	Saskatoon Blades (WCHL)
–	Not exercised		Detroit Red Wings (from Buffalo)^{4}	
165	Gene Strate (D)	Canada	Chicago Black Hawks	Edmonton Oil Kings (WCHL)
166	Gord Halliday (RW)	Canada	Montreal Canadiens	University of Pennsylvania (NCAA)

1. The New York Islanders' eleventh-round pick went to the Toronto Maple Leafs as the result of a trade on May 15, 1973, that sent cash to the Islanders in exchange for the Islanders' tenth-round pick (Lee Palmer) in 1973 NHL Amateur Draft and this pick.
2. The Toronto Maple Leafs' eleventh-round pick went to the Minnesota North Stars as the result of a trade on May 15, 1973, that sent cash to Toronto in exchange for this pick.
3. The Los Angeles Kings' eleventh-round pick went to the Minnesota North Stars as the result of a trade on May 15, 1973, that sent cash to Los Angeles in exchange for this pick.
4. The Buffalo Sabres' eleventh-round pick went to the Detroit Red Wings as the result of a trade on May 15, 1973, that sent cash to Buffalo in exchange for Buffalo's ninth-round (Ray Bibeau), tenth-round pick (Mitch Brandt) in 1973 NHL Amateur Draft and this pick. The Red Wings passed on making a selection.

=== Round twelve ===
#	Player	Nationality	NHL team	College/junior/club team
167	Cap Raeder (G)	United States	Montreal Canadiens	University of New Hampshire (NCAA)

=== Round thirteen ===
#	Player	Nationality	NHL team	College/junior/club team
168	Louis Chiasson (C)	Canada	Montreal Canadiens (from the Rangers)^{1}	Trois-Rivieres Draveurs (QMJHL)
–	Not exercised		New York Rangers (from Montreal)^{2}	

1. The New York Rangers' thirteenth-round pick went to the Montreal Canadiens as the result of a trade on May 15, 1973, that sent Montreal's thirteenth-round pick in 1973 NHL Amateur Draft to the Rangers in exchange for this pick.
2. The Montreal Canadiens' thirteenth-round pick went to the New York Rangers as the result of a trade on May 15, 1973, that sent the Rangers' thirteenth-round pick (Louis Chiasson) in 1973 NHL Amateur Draft to Montreal in exchange for this pick. The Rangers passed on making a selection.

= NHL All-Star team ·	= NHL All-Star ·	= NHL All-Star and NHL All-Star team ·	= Hall of Famers

== Draftees based on nationality ==
Rank	Country	Amount
1	Canada	154
2	United States	14

== See also ==
- 1973–74 NHL season
- List of NHL players
- 1973 WHA amateur draft
