= Lanny McDonald =

Canadian ice hockey player (born 1953)

- Hockey Hall of Fame, 1992
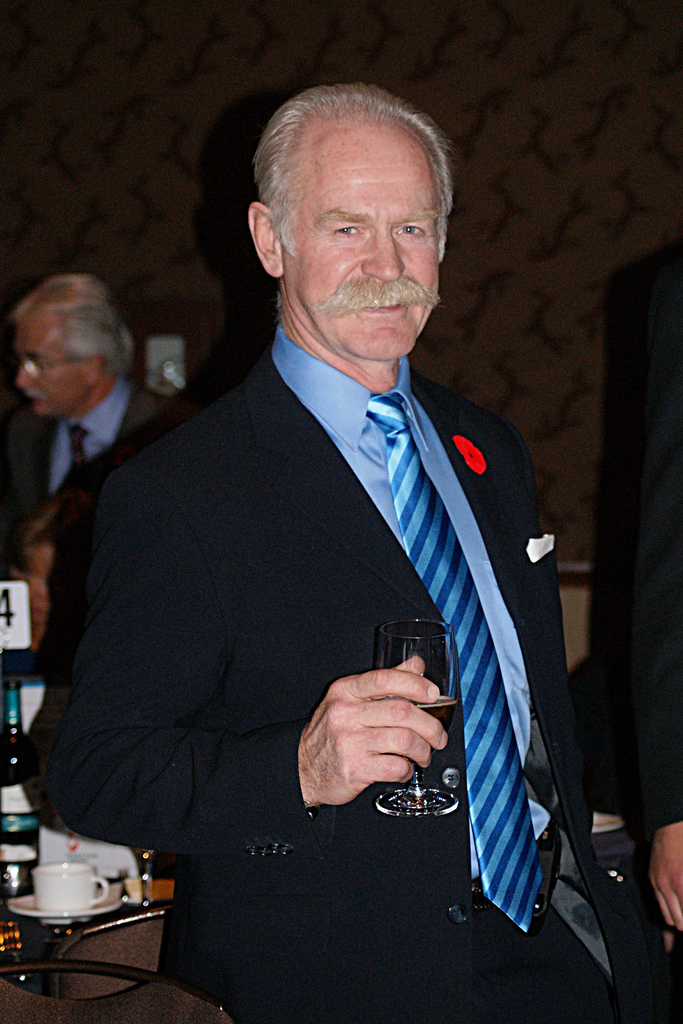
- McDonald in 2010
- Born: February 16, 1953 (age 73) Hanna, Alberta, Canada
- Height: 6 ft 0 in (183 cm)
- Weight: 185 lb (84 kg; 13 st 3 lb)
- Position: Right wing
- Shot: Right
- Played for: Toronto Maple Leafs; Colorado Rockies; Calgary Flames
- National team: Canada
- NHL draft: 4th overall, 1973; Toronto Maple Leafs
- WHA draft: 10th overall, 1973; Cleveland Crusaders
- Playing career: 1973–1989

Lanny King McDonald (born February 16, 1953) is a Canadian former professional ice hockey player who played for the Toronto Maple Leafs, Colorado Rockies and Calgary Flames during his 16-year career in the National Hockey League (NHL). He played over 1,100 games in the NHL between 1973 and 1989 in which he scored 500 goals and over 1,000 points. His total of 66 goals in 1982–83 remains the Flames' franchise record for a single season.

McDonald was selected by the Maple Leafs as the fourth overall pick in the 1973 NHL Amateur Draft and established himself as an offensive forward with three consecutive 40-goal seasons in Toronto in the mid-1970s. His trade to the Rockies in 1979 resulted in Toronto fans protesting the deal in front of Maple Leaf Gardens. He played parts of three seasons in Denver, before he was sent to Calgary in 1981 where he spent the remainder of his career. He co-captained the Flames to a Stanley Cup championship in his final season of 1988–89.

McDonald is among the most popular players in Flames history and his personality and bushy red moustache made him an iconic figure within the sport. McDonald won the Bill Masterton Memorial Trophy for dedication and sportsmanship in 1983 and in 1988 was named the inaugural winner of the King Clancy Memorial Trophy for his leadership and humanitarian presence, in particular through his long association with the Special Olympics.

Internationally, McDonald represented Team Canada as a player on two occasions and in a management role three times. His assist created the tournament winning overtime goal of the inaugural 1976 Canada Cup, and he was director of player personnel of Canada's 2004 World Championship winning team.

The Flames retired McDonald's uniform number 9 in 1990. McDonald was inducted into the Hockey Hall of Fame in 1992, the Alberta Sports Hall of Fame in 1993 and Canada's Sports Hall of Fame in 2017. In 2015, he was named chairman of the board of the Hockey Hall of Fame, after serving nine years on the Hall's selection committee. He was named to the Order of Hockey in Canada in 2022, and has been a trustee of the Stanley Cup since 2023.

== Early life ==
McDonald was born February 16, 1953, in Hanna, Alberta. He is the youngest of four children after brother Lynn and sisters Donna and Dixie. His father, Lorne, tended the family farm near the hamlet of Craigmyle, 35 kilometres (22 mi) outside Hanna. The young Lanny viewed his father as his hero, often following Lorne around helping with whatever chores he could. McDonald credits his father for teaching him the value of honesty and hard work. His mother, Phyllis, was a full-time teacher who was frequently involved with community events.

Learning to skate at the age of five, McDonald immediately developed a passion for hockey. He served as a stick boy, helping manage equipment, for his father's community team and grew up listening to the famous Foster Hewitt radio broadcasts of Hockey Night in Canada. McDonald shared his father's passion for the Toronto Maple Leafs; he was given his middle name, King, after Maple Leafs' star King Clancy. He began playing organized hockey at the age of six and, despite both having full-time commitments, his parents drove him and Lynn to Hanna for their practices and games. McDonald recalled that half of his time in youth hockey was spent in Hanna, and the other half in the car. He completed high school while playing in Lethbridge, choosing to remain with his junior A team in 1970–71 rather than join the Medicine Hat Tigers of the Western Canada Hockey League (WCHL) so that he could complete his diploma.

== Playing career ==
=== Junior ===
McDonald began his junior career in 1969 with the Lethbridge Sugar Kings of the tier II Alberta Junior Hockey League (AJHL). He appeared in 34 games for the Sugar Kings as a 16-year-old, scoring two goals. The following season, 1970–71, he emerged as a leading scorer, recording 37 goals and 82 points in 45 games. He was voted the league's most valuable player and named to the second All-Star team. Additionally, McDonald appeared in six WCHL games with the Calgary Centennials.

The Medicine Hat Tigers acquired McDonald's playing rights in a trade during the 1970–71 WCHL season. He joined the team the following year, finishing eighth in league scoring with 114 points, including 50 goals. He improved to 62 goals and 139 points in 1972–73 to finish third overall in league scoring and was named to the WCHL All-Star team at forward. McDonald added 37 points in the playoffs as the Tigers won the league championship.

In McDonald's draft year of 1973, the National Hockey League (NHL) was in competition with the rival World Hockey Association (WHA) for talent. McDonald was considered a top junior prospect and was recruited by both leagues. The Vancouver Canucks had the third overall selection in the NHL draft and were interested in drafting him, but opted against it when McDonald made it clear he would likely go to the WHA rather than play with Vancouver. Instead, he went to the Toronto Maple Leafs with the fourth overall pick. In the WHA draft, he was selected 10th overall by the Cleveland Crusaders. McDonald chose to play in the NHL, signing a contract with the Maple Leafs that was considered to be among the richest in the league. The deal, worth between $175,000 and $200,000 per season, came as a result of the competition between the two leagues and McDonald found that some of the older players in Toronto resented him as a result.

=== Toronto Maple Leafs ===
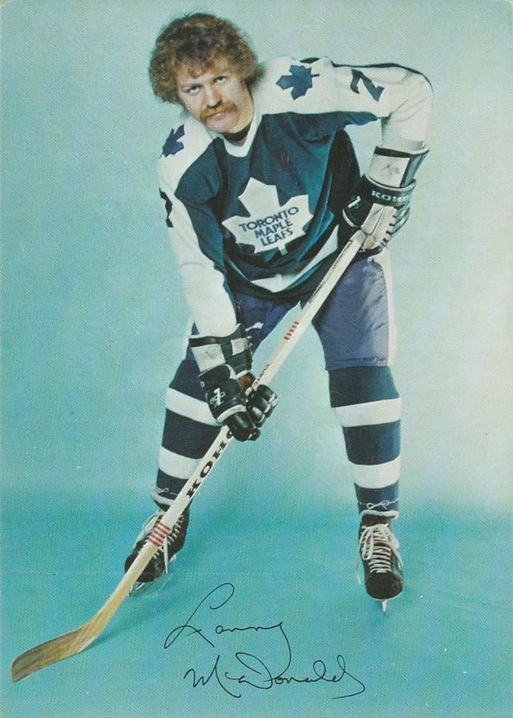
McDonald with the Toronto Maple Leafs in 1976

McDonald made his NHL debut with the Leafs on October 10, 1973, against the Buffalo Sabres. He suffered a concussion immediately after the opening and required several stitches after landing on his head as a result of a check by Rick Martin. When McDonald returned to the ice sheet he put on his Winwell style helmet that he had worn as a Medicine Hat Tiger, which he wore for the rest of his career. All told he went helmetless for approximately 2.8 seconds as a professional; he had two assists in his first game as a Maple Leaf. It was the only time in his career he did not wear a helmet, as he felt that his injury contributed to his early struggles in the NHL. McDonald scored his first NHL goal on October 17 against Michel Larocque of the Montreal Canadiens, but finished the season with only 14 goals and 30 points in 1973–74. His continued inability to score early in the 1974–75 season nearly resulted in a trade. Atlanta Flames general manager Cliff Fletcher sought to take advantage of the Maple Leafs' early disappointment in McDonald and agreed in principle to a trade for the young forward in exchange for Curt Bennett. However, McDonald scored three goals in his following two games causing Toronto to back out of the deal. McDonald recorded a modest improvement over his rookie campaign: 17 goals and 44 points.

"Playing for my country in '76 was a tremendous honour. I got a phone call from someone claiming to be Alan Eagleson asking me if I wanted to try out for Team Canada in preparation for the first Canada Cup in 1976. At first, I thought it was Darryl (Sittler) playing a practical joke on me. It took Eagle some convincing before I realized I really was being invited to Team Canada's training camp."

— McDonald describes how he reacted to earning an invitation to try out for the national team at the 1976 Canada Cup.

The patience the Maple Leafs had shown McDonald in his first two seasons was rewarded in 1975–76 when he rediscovered his offensive touch, scoring 37 goals and adding 56 assists. Following the season, he earned an invite to the Canadian national team's summer camp in advance of the 1976 Canada Cup. McDonald was named to the roster, and appeared in five of Team Canada's seven games. He recorded two assists in the tournament, one of which came on Darryl Sittler's overtime goal that clinched the inaugural Canada Cup championship.

A 43-goal season in 1976–77 earned McDonald several accolades. He was named to the Wales Conference team at the 1977 All-Star Game where he scored two goals in a 4–3 victory over the Campbell Conference. He was also named a second team All-Star at right wing following the season. It was the first of three consecutive 40-goal seasons for McDonald, and he finished in the top ten in NHL scoring in both 1977–78 and 1978–79. He appeared in his second All-Star Game in 1978 and played for the NHL All-Stars in the 1979 Challenge Cup against the Soviet national team.

The highlight of McDonald's career in Toronto came in the 1978 Stanley Cup playoffs against the New York Islanders. The Maple Leafs were viewed as underdogs in the series against an Islanders team that was considered to be among the best in the league. Toronto overcame a 2–0 series deficit to force a seventh and deciding game. Playing despite breaking both his wrist and nose during the series, McDonald scored the overtime winning goal that eliminated the Islanders and allowed the Maple Leafs to advance to the league semi-finals for the first time in 11 years. Toronto was then eliminated by Montreal, who swept the series with four consecutive victories.

=== Colorado Rockies ===
Punch Imlach was named Toronto general manager prior to the 1979–80 season and immediately clashed with team captain Darryl Sittler. Imlach wanted to move Sittler to another team, but the player refused to waive his no-trade clause. Imlach responded by trading teammates friendly to Sittler instead. On December 28, 1979, Imlach dealt McDonald to the Colorado Rockies, along with Joel Quenneville, in exchange for Wilf Paiement and Pat Hickey. The deal came as a surprise even to Toronto's head coach.

McDonald was devastated by the trade, particularly because he and his wife were expecting their second child and had just purchased a new house. In his 1987 autobiography, he argued that Imlach made the trade out of spite. McDonald had also come into conflict with Imlach while serving as the team's representative of the National Hockey League Players' Association (NHLPA) when the general manager refused to honour an increase in the per diem paid to each player. The trade outraged fans in Toronto, where McDonald was among the team's most popular players. While fans picketed outside Maple Leaf Gardens in protest, McDonald told the media that he felt fortunate to have been traded away from the unsettled situation the Leafs were in and blamed Imlach for the team's failures on the ice. Sittler resigned as the team's captain following the trade.

Arriving in Colorado, McDonald found himself at the centre of another power struggle. Sympathetic to the fact that his wife was less than two weeks away from giving birth, head coach Don Cherry gave McDonald permission to leave the team on off-days to return to his wife in Toronto. But he did so without gaining the approval of general manager Ray Miron, who disagreed frequently with Cherry and fired him following the season. On the ice, McDonald scored 35 goals with the Rockies and finished with a total of 40 between the two teams.

Rumours circulated following the season that Maple Leafs owner Harold Ballard had told the media that he was attempting to reacquire McDonald. The Rockies disputed that any such negotiations had taken place and Ballard quickly apologized for the news story after Colorado threatened to file tampering charges against the Maple Leafs' owner. McDonald served as the Rockies' captain, and scored 35 goals and 81 points in 1980–81, his only full season with the team.

=== Calgary Flames ===
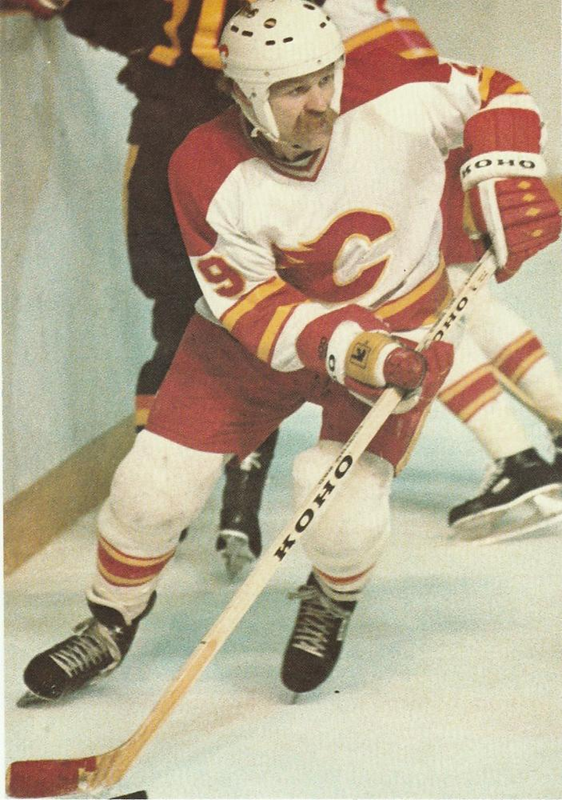
McDonald with the Calgary Flames in 1982

Stating that his team needed to add character and leadership, Cliff Fletcher finally completed a trade for McDonald seven years after his first attempt. McDonald was acquired by the Calgary Flames, along with a draft pick, in exchange for Bob MacMillan and Don Lever on November 25, 1981. The deal occurred one day after the last place Rockies lost to the Flames by a 9–2 score. Once the team's plane landed in Winnipeg, McDonald was informed of the trade and told to return to Calgary. Angered at first, he viewed the deal as an insult, that the worst team in the NHL had rejected him.

McDonald also felt the pressure of having to replace two popular ex-Flames in MacMillan and Lever while also working to overcome a separated shoulder he suffered earlier in the year with the Rockies. He made his debut with the Flames the following night, a 7–1 victory over the Los Angeles Kings, after which McDonald remarked that it was the most fun he had playing the game in a long time. He was given a loud ovation by the fans who immediately embraced him as a local hero, even though it took him seven games before he scored his first goal as a member of the Flames. He scored 34 goals in Calgary, and combined with the 6 scored in Colorado, finished with his fifth 40-goal campaign in six years.

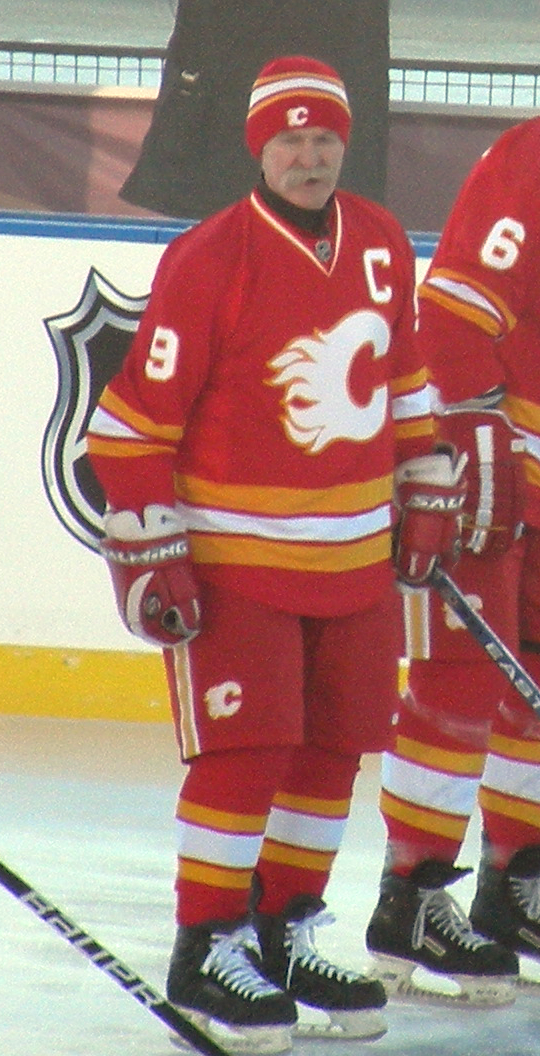
McDonald participated in the alumni game at the 2011 Heritage Classic.

The 1982–83 season was dominated by McDonald's battle with Wayne Gretzky of the Edmonton Oilers for the league lead in goals. Amidst the best offensive season of his career, McDonald scored a hat trick against Pittsburgh to give him 47 goals at the mid-season break for the 1983 All-Star Game, a total that tied his career high. He was named to the starting lineup for the All-Star Game and was the league's leading goal scorer at that point, two ahead of Gretzky. McDonald finished with 66 goals, five short of Gretzky's 71. At that time, only Gretzky, Mike Bossy and Phil Esposito had ever scored more goals in one NHL season. McDonald was named to the second All-Star team for the second time in his career and was voted the winner of the Bill Masterton Memorial Trophy, given to the player who "best exemplifies the qualities of perseverance, sportsmanship and dedication to hockey". His 66 goals remains a Flames' single season record.

Following the trade of Phil Russell in the summer of 1983, McDonald and Doug Risebrough were named co-captains for the 1983–84 season. They were joined by Jim Peplinski the following season. McDonald missed 15 games due to injuries which reduced his scoring to 33 goals and 66 points, but he played in his fourth All-Star Game. He scored the first Flames goal in the Olympic Saddledome, on the building's opening night of October 15, 1983.

McDonald became the 21st player in NHL history to score 400 career goals, reaching the mark in a 7–4 loss in Los Angeles on December 21, 1983. He was initially credited with scoring the milestone goal in his previous game, against the Winnipeg Jets, but after reviewing a replay of the goal himself, McDonald asked the league to credit it to teammate Eddy Beers who had deflected his shot. His injury problems worsened in 1984–85 as he missed the start of the season with pulled muscles and was limited to just 43 games.

As the 1985–86 season approached, McDonald endured questions about whether he was reaching the point where age and injuries meant he could no longer be an effective NHL player. Hoping to prove himself, he set a goal of playing all 80 games for the Flames. He succeeded, and scored 28 goals and 71 points in the process, despite dislocating his thumb in the preseason and suffering minor knee and hip injuries during the course of the year. He later said it was a matter of pride to him not to miss a game. In the playoffs, McDonald was witness to one of the most infamous mistakes in NHL history. With the score tied at two in the seventh game of the Smythe Division final against Edmonton, McDonald chased Oilers' rookie Steve Smith around the Edmonton net. Smith attempted to pass the puck forward, but inadvertently hit the back of goaltender Grant Fuhr's skate, deflecting the puck into his own net.

It turned out to be the winning goal for Calgary who eliminated Edmonton to clinch the Smythe Division championship. The victory over their provincial rivals also touched off a celebration amongst the fans, of which over 20,000 greeted the team with wild cheering when their plane landed at Calgary International Airport. A series win over the St. Louis Blues led McDonald and the Flames into their first Stanley Cup Final, against Montreal. The series ended in disappointment: He watched from the bench as his teammates unsuccessfully attempted to tie the deciding game in the final minute and the Canadiens defeated the Flames in five games to win the Stanley Cup.

Two separate knee injuries limited McDonald in 1986–87. His total of 14 goals in 58 games was his fewest since his rookie season. He reached a milestone in the Flames' final game of the season, appearing in the 1,000th game of his career. Following a 10-goal campaign in 60 games in 1987–88, McDonald reached two additional major milestones in the 1988–89 season. On March 7, 1989, he scored the 1,000th point of his career with a wraparound goal from behind the net against Bob Essensa in a 9–5 victory against the Winnipeg Jets. Two weeks later, on March 21, he scored the 500th goal of his career on a nearly identical wraparound against Mark Fitzpatrick of the New York Islanders. It was the final regular season goal of McDonald's career.

"This is the most peaceful feeling I've ever experienced in hockey. There's no feeling like it. I wish I could describe it to people outside. I think you appreciate it a lot more after you've been trying to win it for 16 years, like I have."

— McDonald shares his emotions after winning the Stanley Cup

At 36 years old and approaching the end of his career, the 1989 Stanley Cup playoffs was potentially his last chance at winning the Stanley Cup. The Flames defeated the Vancouver Canucks, Los Angeles Kings and Chicago Blackhawks to set up a Stanley Cup Final rematch of the 1986 Stanley Cup Final with the Montreal Canadiens. McDonald was left out of the Flames' lineup for the third, fourth and fifth games, but with Calgary leading the series three wins to two, head coach Terry Crisp felt that if the Flames were to win the championship, McDonald deserved to be in the game. Crisp's decision paid dividends, as midway through the sixth game, McDonald stepped onto the ice after serving a penalty to join Håkan Loob and Joe Nieuwendyk in a three-on-one rush toward the Montreal goal. Loob passed the puck up to Nieuwendyk, who saw a streaking McDonald coming up the right side of the ice. McDonald received the pass then shot the puck over Montreal goaltender Patrick Roy's glove to give the Flames a 2–1 lead. Doug Gilmour added two goals, and Calgary won the game 4–2 to earn the franchise's first Stanley Cup championship. League president John Ziegler presented the trophy to McDonald, co-captain Jim Peplinski and alternate Tim Hunter. Wearing the captain's "C" for the game, McDonald was the first member of the Flames to carry the trophy as the team paraded it around the Forum in celebration.

== Management career ==
McDonald announced his retirement as a player on August 28, 1989, stating in a press conference that he made the determination before the 1988–89 season began that it would be his last. He also revealed that he had received an offer from another, unnamed, team to play in 1989–90 but felt that it was the right time to end his career. The Flames made McDonald their vice president in charge of corporate and community affairs. He chose the corporate position partly due to a fascination with the business world, and partly to remain close to his family as a role in hockey operations would have necessitated more travel. His interest in business grew following his trade to Calgary as he was featured in numerous commercials and signed endorsements throughout southern Alberta. He had also previously served as a vice president of the NHLPA in the early 1980s. McDonald changed roles in 1992 as he was named the team's Vice President of Marketing. After serving four years in that position, McDonald became the Vice President of Corporate Development in 1996.

McDonald was part of a committee tasked with hiring a new management team in June 2000. The media speculated that after several years in a corporate position, he hoped to land a role as a vice president within hockey operations. He received no such role, and two months after the hiring of Craig Button as executive vice president and general manager of the Flames, McDonald announced he was leaving the organization. McDonald denied claims from team sources that he was upset at not gaining a new role when Button was hired. He stated that after "nineteen great years here in one organization", it was the right time to retire. He retained a small role in the organization, serving as a board member of the Saddledome Foundation.

Ken King, newly hired president of the Flames, lured McDonald back into the organization a year later by naming him an executive assistant to hockey operations. McDonald held the position until 2003. He also served in hockey operations roles with Hockey Canada. McDonald was the general manager of Team Canada for the 2001 and 2002 World Championships. He returned in 2004 in a role as director of player personnel of Canada's gold medal-winning squad.

== Playing style ==
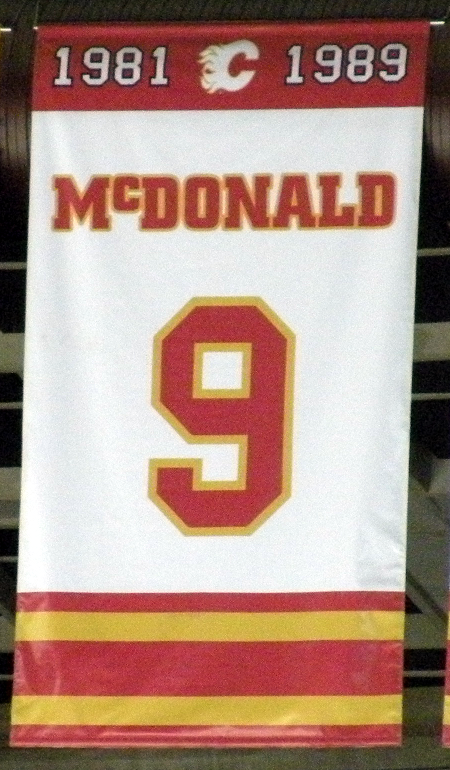
McDonald was the first player in Flames history to have his number retired by the team.

McDonald was known primarily as an offensive player with a hard shot. His wrist shot was considered to be effective, and his scoring exploits in junior hockey earned him the nickname "Machine-Gun Lanny". Red Kelly, McDonald's coach in his first NHL seasons, recalled that he was impressed with his young player's skill handling the puck and defended McDonald against critics who wanted him moved out of Toronto due to his early struggles. In his NHL career, McDonald led his team in goal scoring six times: 1976–77, 1977–78 and 1978–79 with Toronto, 1980–81 with Colorado, and 1981–82 and 1982–83 in Calgary. He was also a physical player, willing to play a hard-hitting style in the corners.

As age and injuries took their toll, McDonald's role with the Flames changed. His playing time decreased in his later years as he was no longer counted on to be the team's primary offensive threat. Often left out of the lineup in his final season, McDonald was expected to provide a boost to the team when he drew into the lineup. He was counted on to provide a veteran presence and to act as a mentor for the team's younger players.

== Legacy ==
The Flames arrived in Calgary after relocating from Atlanta for the 1980–81 season. The organization entered a transitional phase, as many players used to the warm weather and relaxed atmosphere of Atlanta were unable or unwilling to adapt to the higher expectations fans in Calgary placed on them. David Poile, then Flames assistant general manager, stated that the team had an identity crisis as a result. It was in this atmosphere that general manager Cliff Fletcher made the trade for McDonald on November 25, 1981, claiming that McDonald added two characteristics the Flames lacked: character and leadership.

McDonald's arrival in Calgary was considered a turning point for the organization, one where his personality, demeanor and on-ice play came to define the Flames in the 1980s. Poile argued that it signalled the true beginning of the team in its new market: "The trade for Lanny McDonald was the start of the Calgary Flames franchise. It gave us that Calgary identity, that Western Canadian flavor." Columnist and co-author of McDonald's autobiography, Steve Simmons, agreed. He added that the personal and professional disappointments McDonald endured in Toronto and Colorado resulted in his gaining a greater appreciation of both the game and himself. McDonald was extremely popular with his teammates and the fans wherever he played, as well as with the media – he was named Colorado's athlete of the year in 1980 by the state's sportswriters.

Renowned for his leadership ability, McDonald cultivated the respect of the team's younger players. He came into the NHL at a time when the battle with the rival WHA for talent led to rookies signing for far more money than the previous generation of players commanded. Consequently, McDonald faced the resentment of several of Toronto's veteran players and resolved to show greater respect to those that followed him. His efforts left a lasting impression on his peers; among them was Tiger Williams who called McDonald "a great ambassador" for the NHL.

The Flames made McDonald the first player in franchise history to have his jersey retired when they raised his number 9 to the rafters of the Olympic Saddledome in a ceremony on March 17, 1990. As part of its 1992 class, he was also the first former Flame to gain induction into the Hockey Hall of Fame. One year later he was inducted into the Alberta Sports Hall of Fame. McDonald's image endured well into retirement; in 2008, he was the only athlete named in a list of Alberta's ten greatest citizens compiled by the Calgary Herald. In 2017, McDonald was awarded the Order of Sport, marking induction into Canada's Sports Hall of Fame.

McDonald was named to the Order of Hockey in Canada in 2022. He has been a Stanley Cup trustee since August 3, 2023.

== Personal life ==
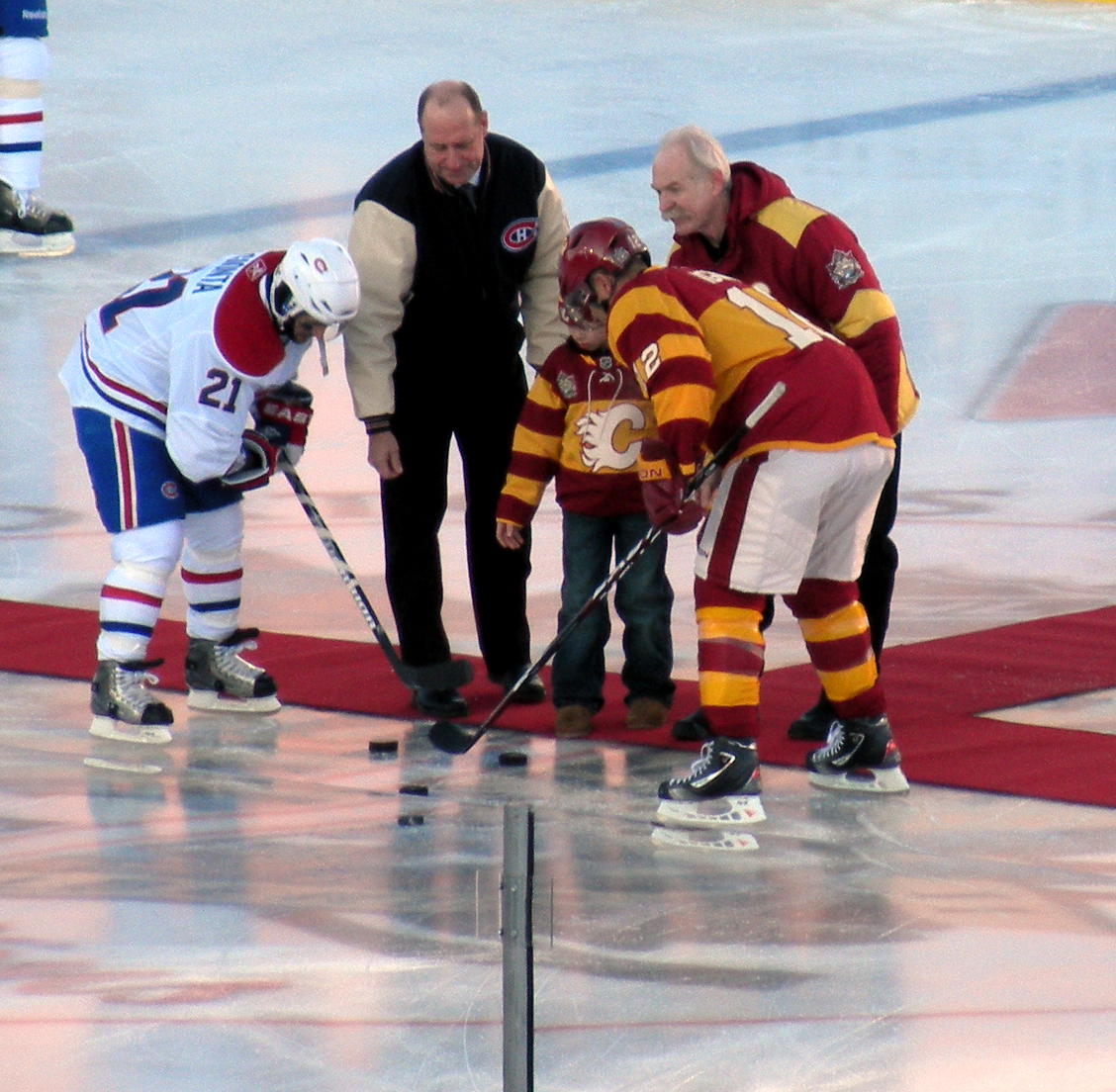
McDonald and his grandson help conduct the ceremonial faceoff at the Heritage Classic.

McDonald met his wife Ardell while playing junior hockey for the Medicine Hat Tigers. They were married in 1975, and have four children: daughters Andra and Leah, and sons Barrett and Graham. The family settled in Calgary after McDonald's trade to the Flames. They also maintain a summer home in Montana, where the family has invested in restaurants and a craft brewery in the community of Lakeside. Co-owned by Andra, the brewery considers McDonald its inspiration, and produces "Old 'Stache Porter" in his honour.

His giant, walrus-style moustache is McDonald's most defining physical characteristic and helped him become an iconic figure in the sport. He developed it in 1974, spending the summer seeing what kind of beard he could grow. Knowing that the Maple Leafs did not allow players to maintain beards at the time, he settled on what he described as a "normal moustache" once he returned to Toronto. Some time later, he was inspired by baseball player Sparky Lyle's moustache and chose to grow one in a similar style. It became a symbol for the Flames as some fans took to wearing fake red moustaches during playoff runs. Razor manufacturers offered endorsements if he would shave it, which he refused.

"Lanny brings with him a high profile for the Special Olympics. He's helped us develop sponsors. He attends all our major events. He works with the athletes, communicating with them as if they were his equal, and they are. They just love him."

— Al Brolin, president of Canadian Special Olympics in 1987

Among his charitable and humanitarian efforts, McDonald is best known for his participation with the Special Olympics. He first became involved with the organization in 1974 when the Maple Leafs asked him to represent the team at the Special Olympics Summer Games. The event began a decades long association for McDonald. He was the honorary coach of the 1986 Special Olympics Summer Games in Calgary, and served as a head coach for the Canadian Special Olympics floor hockey team. In 1988, McDonald's contributions to the Special Olympics as a coach and co-chairman of the organization's fundraising efforts, as well as his work with the Alberta Children's Miracle Network Hospitals, were recognized by the NHL as he was named the inaugural recipient of the King Clancy Memorial Trophy. The award is given to the hockey player who best exemplifies leadership on the ice with humanitarian contributions off of it. McDonald was previously honoured by the Flames as the first winner of the Ralph T. Scurfield Humanitarian Award in 1987, which he won again in 1989.

McDonald's autobiography, Lanny, co-written by Steve Simmons, was published in 1987. A Canadian best-seller, it was an unexpected success for publisher McGraw-Hill. The book sold 10,000 copies in its first couple months of publication, for which the publisher made a donation of $10,000 to the Special Olympics. McDonald was given an honorary doctorates from the University of Lethbridge in 2003 and the University of Calgary in 2008.

On February 4, 2024, while returning home from the 2024 NHL All-Star festivities, McDonald suffered a heart attack and went into cardiac arrest at the Calgary International Airport. Rajdeep Cheema noticed a man experiencing a medical emergency at the Calgary International Airport, and immediately began performing CPR. Two off-duty nurses, Sheri Warkentin and Denise Geck, had just gotten off an incoming flight and quickly took over performing CPR, allowing Rajdeep to find a nearby AED. A CPS member (Jose Cives) quickly rushed over, and together, the four of them tirelessly worked to re-establish the man's heart rhythm for approximately 15 minutes, alternating between CPR and using the AED. He was subsequently hospitalized for two weeks, during which he underwent quadruple bypass surgery and received a pacemaker.

== Career statistics ==
=== Regular season and playoffs ===
			Regular season					Playoffs
Season	Team	League	GP	G	A	Pts	PIM	GP	G	A	Pts	PIM
1969–70	Lethbridge Sugar Kings	AJHL	34	2	9	11	19	—	—	—	—	—
1970–71	Lethbridge Sugar Kings	AJHL	45	37	45	82	56	—	—	—	—	—
1970–71	Calgary Centennials	WCHL	6	0	2	2	6	—	—	—	—	—
1971–72	Medicine Hat Tigers	WCHL	68	50	64	114	54	—	—	—	—	—
1972–73	Medicine Hat Tigers	WCHL	68	62	77	139	84	—	—	—	—	—
1973–74	Toronto Maple Leafs	NHL	70	14	16	30	43	—	—	—	—	—
1974–75	Toronto Maple Leafs	NHL	64	17	27	44	86	7	0	0	0	2
1975–76	Toronto Maple Leafs	NHL	75	37	56	93	70	10	4	4	8	4
1976–77	Toronto Maple Leafs	NHL	80	46	44	90	77	9	10	7	17	6
1977–78	Toronto Maple Leafs	NHL	74	47	40	87	54	13	3	4	7	10
1978–79	Toronto Maple Leafs	NHL	79	43	42	85	32	6	3	2	5	0
1979–80	Toronto Maple Leafs	NHL	35	15	15	30	10	—	—	—	—	—
1979–80	Colorado Rockies	NHL	46	25	20	45	43	—	—	—	—	—
1980–81	Colorado Rockies	NHL	80	35	46	81	56	—	—	—	—	—
1981–82	Colorado Rockies	NHL	16	6	9	15	20	—	—	—	—	—
1981–82	Calgary Flames	NHL	55	34	33	67	37	3	0	1	1	6
1982–83	Calgary Flames	NHL	80	66	32	98	90	7	3	4	7	19
1983–84	Calgary Flames	NHL	65	33	33	66	64	11	6	7	13	6
1984–85	Calgary Flames	NHL	43	19	18	37	36	1	0	0	0	0
1985–86	Calgary Flames	NHL	80	28	43	71	44	22	11	7	18	30
1986–87	Calgary Flames	NHL	58	14	12	26	54	5	0	0	0	2
1987–88	Calgary Flames	NHL	60	10	13	23	57	9	3	1	4	6
1988–89	Calgary Flames	NHL	51	11	7	18	26	14	1	3	4	29
NHL totals			1,111	500	506	1,006	899	117	44	40	84	120

=== International ===
Year	Team	Event	Results	GP	G	A	Pts	PIM
1976	Canada	CC	1st place, gold medalist(s)	5	0	2	2	0
1981	Canada	WC	4th	8	3	0	3	4
Senior totals				13	3	2	5	4

== Awards and honours ==
Junior
Award	Year	Ref
AJHL Most Valuable Player	1970–71	
AJHL second All-Star team	1970–71	
WCHL All-Star team	1972–73	

National Hockey League
Award	Year	Ref
Second team All-Star	1976–77; 1982–83	
Bill Masterton Memorial Trophy	1982–83	
King Clancy Memorial Trophy	1987–88	
Stanley Cup champion	1989	
Budweiser NHL Man of the Year Award	1988–89	

Team Awards
Award	Year	Ref
Colorado State Athlete of the Year	1980	
Molson Cup	1982–83	
Ralph T. Scurfield Humanitarian Award	1986–87; 1988–89	

== See also ==
- List of members of the Hockey Hall of Fame

Preceded by George Ferguson	Toronto Maple Leafs first-round draft pick 1973	Succeeded by Bob Neely
Preceded by Chico Resch	Bill Masterton Trophy winner 1983	Succeeded by Brad Park
Preceded by None	Winner of the King Clancy Memorial Trophy; 1988	Succeeded by Bryan Trottier
Preceded by René Robert	Colorado Rockies captain 1981	Succeeded by Rob Ramage
Preceded by Phil Russell	Calgary Flames captain 1983–1989 with Doug Risebrough (1983–1987) and Jim Peplinski (1984–1989)	Succeeded by Jim Peplinski
Preceded by Brian O'Neill	Stanley Cup Trustee; 2023–present	Succeeded by Incumbent
