= Gord Titcomb =

Canadian ice hockey player

- Born: September 3, 1953 (age 72) Dalhousie, New Brunswick, Canada
- Height: 5 ft 11 in (180 cm)
- Weight: 186 lb (84 kg; 13 st 4 lb)
- Position: Left wing
- Shot: Left
- Played for: Toronto Toros
- NHL draft: 68th overall, 1973; Toronto Maple Leafs
- WHA draft: 82nd overall, 1973; Toronto Toros
- Playing career: 1973–1977

Gord Titcomb (born September 3, 1953) is a Canadian former professional ice hockey player who played in the World Hockey Association (WHA).

== Career ==
Drafted in the fifth round of the 1973 NHL Amateur Draft by the Toronto Maple Leafs, Titcomb opted to play in the WHA after being selected by the Toronto Toros in the seventh round of the 1973 WHA Amateur Draft. He played two games for the Toros during the 1974–75 WHA season.

== Career statistics ==
=== Regular season and playoffs ===
			Regular season					Playoffs
Season	Team	League	GP	G	A	Pts	PIM	GP	G	A	Pts	PIM
1971–72	St. Catharines Black Hawks	OHA	54	12	18	30	167	—	—	—	—	—
1972–73	St. Catharines Black Hawks	OHA	43	11	23	34	159	—	—	—	—	—
1973–74	Jacksonville Barons	AHL	31	2	2	4	47	—	—	—	—	—
1973–74	Mohawk Valley Comets	NAHL	27	6	4	10	38	—	—	—	—	—
1974–75	Mohawk Valley Comets	NAHL	66	18	28	46	60	4	2	0	2	2
1974–75	Toronto Toros	WHA	2	0	1	1	0	—	—	—	—	—
1975–76	Tucson Mavericks	CHL	71	28	31	59	52	—	—	—	—	—
1976–77	Charlotte Checkers	SHL	47	11	19	30	93	—	—	—	—	—
WHA totals			2	0	1	1	0	—	—	—	—	—
