= Robbie Neale =

Canadian ice hockey player (born 1953)

- Born: April 17, 1953 (age 73) Winnipeg, Manitoba, Canada
- Height: 6 ft 0 in (183 cm)
- Weight: 190 lb (86 kg; 13 st 8 lb)
- Position: Forward
- Shot: Left
- Played for: WHA; Cleveland Crusaders; Winnipeg Jets
- National team: Canada
- NHL draft: 43rd overall, 1973; Detroit Red Wings
- WHA draft: 36th overall, 1973; Cleveland Crusaders
- Playing career: 1973–1975

Robbie Neale (born April 17, 1953) is a Canadian retired ice hockey forward who played 59 games in the World Hockey Association.

== Career statistics ==
			Regular season					Playoffs
Season	Team	League	GP	G	A	Pts	PIM	GP	G	A	Pts	PIM
1970–71	Brandon Wheat Kings	WCHL	62	24	35	59	125	—	—	—	—	—
1971–72	Brandon Wheat Kings	WCHL	65	53	73	126	54	—	—	—	—	—
1972–73	Brandon Wheat Kings	WCHL	67	41	57	98	94	—	—	—	—	—
1973–74	Cleveland Crusaders	WHA	43	8	9	17	30	5	0	0	0	4
1974–75	Cape Codders	NAHL	50	27	25	52	52	4	1	1	2	10
1974–75	Cleveland Crusaders	WHA	9	1	3	4	4	—	—	—	—	—
1974–75	Winnipeg Jets	WHA	7	0	2	2	4	—	—	—	—	—
1975–76	Cape Codders	NAHL	44	30	47	77	51	—	—	—	—	—
1975–76	Erie Blades	NAHL	24	20	22	42	20	5	4	2	6	18
1976–77	Erie Blades	NAHL	56	35	31	66	64	6	2	4	6	12
1977–78	Cranbrook Royals	WIHL	?	23	25	48	102	—	—	—	—	—
WHA totals			59	9	14	23	38	5	0	0	0	4
