= Jim Cowell (ice hockey) =

Canadian ice hockey player

- Born: October 18, 1953 (age 72) Newmarket, Ontario, Canada
- Height: 5 ft 9 in (175 cm)
- Weight: 180 lb (82 kg; 12 st 12 lb)
- Position: Forward
- Shot: Left
- Played for: WHL; Seattle Totems; IHL; Des Moines Capitols; Fort Wayne Komets; NAHL; Syracuse Blazers; AHL; Philadelphia Firebirds; Rochester Americans; PHL; San Francisco Shamrocks; EHL; Johnstown Wings; Erie Blades; ACHL; Erie Golden Blades
- NHL draft: 83rd overall, 1973; Vancouver Canucks
- WHA draft: 47th overall, 1973; Los Angeles Sharks
- Playing career: 1973–1987

Jim Cowell (born October 18, 1953) is a Canadian former professional ice hockey player. He was selected by the Vancouver Canucks in the sixth round (83rd overall) of the 1973 NHL Amateur Draft, and was also drafted by the Los Angeles Sharks in the 4th round (47th overall) of the 1973 WHA Amateur Draft.

Cowell played major junior hockey with the Ottawa 67's of the Ontario Hockey League. In the summer of 1973 he was selected in both the NHL and WHA drafts, however he broke his ankle while attending the Vancouver Canucks training camp forcing him to miss the start of the 1973-74 season. Cowell never played in the major leagues, but he did go on to play 14 seasons of professional hockey in the minor leagues.
