= Morris Titanic =

Canadian ice hockey player (born 1953)

- Born: January 7, 1953 (age 73) Toronto, Ontario, Canada
- Height: 6 ft 1 in (185 cm)
- Weight: 180 lb (82 kg; 12 st 12 lb)
- Position: Left wing
- Shot: Left
- Played for: Buffalo Sabres
- NHL draft: 12th overall, 1973; Buffalo Sabres
- WHA draft: 17th overall, 1973; Quebec Nordiques
- Playing career: 1970–1980

Morris Steven Titanic (born January 7, 1953) is a Canadian former professional ice hockey player. He was selected 12th overall in the 1973 NHL entry draft by the Buffalo Sabres and played 19 games with them between 1974 and 1975. The Quebec Nordiques of the World Hockey Association drafted him in the 2nd round, 17th overall of the WHA Draft the same year, but he never played in that league.

== Playing career ==
Titanic was born in Toronto, Ontario. As a youth, he played in the 1965 Quebec International Pee-Wee Hockey Tournament with the Toronto Faustina minor ice hockey team. Titanic then played for the Sudbury Wolves during their inaugural season in the Ontario Hockey Association. He recorded 121 points during the 1972–73 season to become the first player from the Wolves to be drafted into the NHL. He was selected 12th overall by the Buffalo Sabres in the 1973 NHL Draft.

He posted no points in 19 career NHL games with the Sabres, but later distinguished himself with the International Hockey League's Milwaukee Admirals. A knee injury sunk Titanic's career during the 1979–80 season while he was playing for the Rochester Americans. In 2013 Titanic and nine other former NHL players sued the NHL and Gary Bettman over concussions suffered during the game.

== Coaching career ==
After retiring, Titanic became the head coach of the Buffalo Jr. Sabres, where he coached players such as Bob Beers and Todd Krygier. Titanic currently is a permanent member of the Buffalo Sabres Alumni Hockey Team.

== Career statistics ==
=== Regular season and playoffs ===
			Regular season					Playoffs
Season	Team	League	GP	G	A	Pts	PIM	GP	G	A	Pts	PIM
1970–71	Niagara Falls Flyers	OHA	59	27	17	44	61	—	—	—	—	—
1971–72	Niagara Falls Flyers	OHA	64	29	28	57	105	—	—	—	—	—
1972–73	Sudbury Wolves	OHA	63	61	60	121	80	—	—	—	—	—
1973–74	Cincinnati Swords	AHL	62	31	28	59	47	5	4	2	6	0
1974–75	Hershey Bears	AHL	34	9	17	26	64	6	3	3	6	16
1974–75	Buffalo Sabres	NHL	17	0	0	0	0	—	—	—	—	—
1975–76	Hershey Bears	AHL	35	6	13	19	10	10	2	1	3	8
1975–76	Buffalo Sabres	NHL	2	0	0	0	0	—	—	—	—	—
1977–78	Hershey Bears	AHL	69	10	20	30	54	—	—	—	—	—
1978–79	Milwaukee Admirals	IHL	75	26	44	70	31	8	3	1	4	0
1979–80	Rochester Americans	AHL	25	3	3	6	6	—	—	—	—	—
AHL totals			225	59	81	140	181	21	9	6	15	24
NHL totals			19	0	0	0	0	—	—	—	—	—

Preceded by Jim Schoenfeld	Buffalo Sabres first-round draft pick 1973	Succeeded by Lee Fogolin
