= André Deschamps =

Canadian ice hockey player

- Born: August 13, 1953 (age 72) Valleyfield, Quebec, Canada
- Height: 5 ft 11 in (180 cm)
- Weight: 185 lb (84 kg; 13 st 3 lb)
- Position: Forward
- Shot: Left
- Played for: Calgary Cowboys (WHA)
- NHL draft: 44th overall, 1973; Buffalo Sabres
- WHA draft: 81st overall, 1973; Quebec Nordiques
- Playing career: 1973–1977

André Deschamps (born August 13, 1953) is a Canadian former professional ice hockey forward. He was drafted by the Quebec Nordiques of the World Hockey Association in the seventh round, 81st overall, of the 1973 WHA Amateur Draft. He played nine games in the WHA with the Calgary Cowboys in the 1976–77 season, scoring one goal and two assists.

Deschamps was also drafted by the Buffalo Sabres of the National Hockey League in the third round, 44th overall, of the 1973 NHL entry draft; however, he never played in that league.

== Career statistics ==
=== Regular season and playoffs ===
			Regular season					Playoffs
Season	Team	League	GP	G	A	Pts	PIM	GP	G	A	Pts	PIM
1970–71	Trois-Rivieres Ducs	QMJHL	62	21	31	52	143	11	0	4	4	58
1971–72	Trois-Rivieres Ducs	QMJHL	19	8	6	14	147	—	—	—	—	—
1971–72	Quebec Remparts	QMJHL	42	19	30	49	261	15	9	6	15	94
1972–73	Quebec Remparts	QMJHL	62	47	51	98	159	14	15	9	24	8
1973–74	Cincinnati Swords	AHL	52	7	8	15	100	—	—	—	—	—
1973–74	Charlotte Checkers	SHL	9	4	2	6	10	13	7	15	22	42
1974–75	Charlotte Checkers	SHL	71	59	42	101	196	10	4	7	11	8
1975–76	Hershey Bears	AHL	67	25	14	39	185	6	1	2	3	19
1976–77	Tidewater Sharks	SHL	9	3	2	5	13	—	—	—	—	—
1976–77	Erie Blades	NAHL	13	7	7	14	32	—	—	—	—	—
1976–77	Calgary Cowboys	WHA	9	1	2	3	19	—	—	—	—	—
WHA totals			9	1	2	3	19	—	—	—	—	—
