= Rick Chinnick =

Canadian retired ice hockey forward

- Born: July 30, 1953 (age 71); Chatham, Ontario, Canada
- Height: 5 ft 11 in (180 cm)
- Weight: 180 lb (82 kg; 12 st 12 lb)
- Position: Right wing
- Shot: Left
- Played for: Minnesota North Stars
- NHL draft: 41st overall, 1973; Minnesota North Stars
- WHA draft: 77th overall, 1973; New England Whalers
- Playing career: 1973–1981

Richard Vaughn Chinnick (born August 15, 1953) is a Canadian retired ice hockey Right wing. He played 4 games for the Minnesota North Stars of the National Hockey League between 1973 and 1975 but spent most of his career, which lasted from 1973 to 1981, in the minor leagues.

== Career statistics ==
=== Regular season and playoffs ===
			Regular season					Playoffs
Season	Team	League	GP	G	A	Pts	PIM	GP	G	A	Pts	PIM
1971–72	Peterborough Petes	OHA	63	21	30	51	25	15	4	9	13	4
1971–72	Peterborough Petes	M-Cup	—	—	—	—	—	3	1	1	2	4
1972–73	Peterborough Petes	OHA	63	42	44	86	31	—	—	—	—	—
1973–74	Minnesota North Stars	NHL	1	0	1	1	0	—	—	—	—	—
1973–74	New Haven Nighthawks	AHL	76	18	15	33	12	10	2	3	5	2
1974–75	Minnesota North Stars	NHL	3	0	1	1	0	—	—	—	—	—
1974–75	New Haven Nighthawks	AHL	58	20	17	37	19	16	10	7	17	4
1975–76	New Haven Nighthawks	AHL	75	21	40	61	8	31	0	1	1	0
1976–77	Saginaw Gears	IHL	78	37	33	70	24	19	9	14	23	0
1977–78	Saginaw Gears	IHL	77	30	45	75	18	5	1	5	6	0
1980–81	Chatham Maroons	OHA Sr	34	25	32	57	—	—	—	—	—	—
AHL totals			209	59	72	131	39	29	12	11	23	6
NHL totals			4	0	2	2	0	—	—	—	—	—
