= Jeff Jacques (ice hockey) =

Canadian ice hockey player

- Born: April 4, 1953 (age 72) Preston, Ontario, Canada
- Height: 6 ft 11 in (211 cm)
- Weight: 190 lb (86 kg; 13 st 8 lb)
- Position: Right wing
- Played for: Toronto Toros; Birmingham Bulls
- NHL draft: 34th overall, 1973; California Golden Seals
- WHA draft: 89th overall, 1973; Winnipeg Jets
- Playing career: 1973–1979

Jeff Jacques (born April 4, 1953) is a Canadian former professional ice hockey winger who played 201 games in the World Hockey Association. He was a member of the Birmingham Bulls and Toronto Toros.

== Career statistics ==
| | | | Regular season | | | | | Playoffs |
| Season | Team | League | GP | G | A | Pts | PIM | GP | G | A | Pts | PIM |
|---|---|---|---|---|---|---|---|---|---|---|---|---|
| 1970–71 | St. Catharines Black Hawks | OHA-Jr. | 42 | 10 | 10 | 20 | 39 | — | — | — | — | — |
| 1971–72 | St. Catharines Black Hawks | OHA-Jr. | 52 | 26 | 31 | 57 | 154 | — | — | — | — | — |
| 1972–73 | St. Catharines Black Hawks | OHA-Jr. | 51 | 32 | 46 | 78 | 82 | — | — | — | — | — |
| 1973–74 | Jacksonville Barons | AHL | 73 | 18 | 25 | 43 | 83 | — | — | — | — | — |
| 1974–75 | Mohawk Valley Comets | NAHL | 38 | 25 | 29 | 54 | 77 | — | — | — | — | — |
| 1974–75 | Toronto Toros | WHA | 41 | 12 | 8 | 20 | 26 | 6 | 0 | 4 | 4 | 2 |
| 1975–76 | Toronto Toros | WHA | 81 | 17 | 33 | 50 | 113 | — | — | — | — | — |
| 1976–77 | Birmingham Bulls | WHA | 79 | 21 | 27 | 48 | 92 | — | — | — | — | — |
| 1977–78 | Brantford Alexanders | OHA-Sr. | 11 | 8 | 5 | 13 | 11 | — | — | — | — | — |
| WHA totals | | | 201 | 50 | 68 | 118 | 231 | 6 | 0 | 4 | 4 | 2 |
