= 1976–77 Los Angeles Kings season =

National Hockey League team season

1976–77 Los Angeles Kings
- Division: 2nd Norris
- Conference: 4th Wales
- 1976–77 record: 34–31–15
- Home record: 20–13–7
- Road record: 14–18–8
- Goals for: 271
- Goals against: 241

Team information
- General manager: Jake Milford
- Coach: Bob Pulford
- Captain: Mike Murphy
- Alternate captains: None
- Arena: Los Angeles Forum

Team leaders
- Goals: Marcel Dionne (53)
- Assists: Marcel Dionne (69)
- Points: Marcel Dionne (122)
- Penalty minutes: Dave Schultz (232)
- Wins: Rogatien Vachon (33)
- Goals against average: Rogatien Vachon (2.72)

The 1976–77 Los Angeles Kings season was the Kings' tenth season in the National Hockey League (NHL).

== Regular season ==
The 1976–77 season was similar to the year before for the Kings. Dionne continued to lead the offense, the defense was unspectacular but solid, but it was a season of roster turnover as some aging veterans departed (e.g. Bob Nevin, Mike Corrigan) and others lost significant time to injuries (Larry Brown, Juha Widing, Sheldon Kannegiesser). Youngsters like Glen Goldup, Lorne Stamler, and Steve Clippingdale struggled although second year defenseman Gary Sargent was solid. The Kings added Dave Schultz (the "Hammer") to replace Dan Maloney who left in the Dionne trade for toughness, but it took nearly all season for the roster to gell. In addition, backup goalie Gary Edwards struggled and was eventually traded for Gary Simmons; he was not the answer either, so #1 goalie Rogie Vachon was overworked. The Kings were also stuck behind the Montreal Canadiens who finished an amazing 60–8–12; many say this was the greatest team in NHL history.

After struggling near or below the .500 mark, the Kings won 5 of their last 6 games to finish 6th overall – the same as the year before although with 2 fewer points.

=== Final standings ===
Norris Division
	GP	W	L	T	GF	GA	Pts
**Montreal Canadiens**	80	60	8	12	387	171	132
**Los Angeles Kings**	80	34	31	15	271	241	83
**Pittsburgh Penguins**	80	34	33	13	240	252	81
Washington Capitals	80	24	42	14	221	307	62
Detroit Red Wings	80	16	55	9	183	309	41

Note: GP = Games played, W = Wins, L = Losses, T = Ties, Pts = Points, GF = Goals for, GA = Goals against
Note: Teams that qualified for the playoffs are highlighted in bold.

=== Record vs. opponents ===
Norris Division record vs. opponents

**Vs. Wales Conference**

**Vs. Campbell Conference**

**Vs. Norris Division**

1976–77 NHL records
Team	**DET**	**LAK**	**MTL**	**PIT**	**WSH**	**Total**
Detroit	—	0–5–1	0–5–1	2–4	0–3–3	**2–17–5**
Los Angeles	5–0–1	—	0–4–2	3–2–1	5–0–1	**13–6–5**
Montreal	5–0–1	4–0–2	—	4–0–2	6–0	**19–0–5**
Pittsburgh	4–2	2–3–1	0–4–2	—	1–4–1	**7–13–4**
Washington	3–0–3	0–5–1	0–6	4–1–1	—	**7–12–5**

**Vs. Adams Division**

1976–77 NHL records
Team	**BOS**	**BUF**	**CLE**	**TOR**	**Total**
Detroit	1–4	1–4	3–2	1–3–1	**6–13–1**
Los Angeles	2–2–1	2–3	2–1–2	1–2–2	**7–8–5**
Montreal	2–3	2–2–1	5–0	2–1–1	**11–6–2**
Pittsburgh	1–3–1	4–0–1	3–0–2	2–1–2	**10–4–6**
Washington	0–4–1	1–4	0–5	3–2	**4–15–1**

**Vs. Patrick Division**

1976–77 NHL records
Team	**ATL**	**NYI**	**NYR**	**PHI**	**Total**
Detroit	1–2–1	2–2	1–3	1–3	**5–10–1**
Los Angeles	2–2	2–2	3–0–1	0–4	**7–8–1**
Montreal	3–0–1	4–0	3–1	4–0	**14–1–1**
Pittsburgh	0–3–1	2–2	2–1–1	1–3	**5–9–2**
Washington	1–3	0–1–3	2–2	0–2–2	**3–8–5**

**Vs. Smythe Division**

1976–77 NHL records
Team	**CHI**	**COL**	**MIN**	**STL**	**VAN**	**Total**
Detroit	0–4	0–4	0–3–1	0–3–1	3–1	**3–15–2**
Los Angeles	2–2	2–0–2	1–3	2–2	0–2–2	**7–9–4**
Montreal	3–0–1	3–0–1	3–0–1	3–1	4–0	**16–1–3**
Pittsburgh	2–2	2–2	3–1	3–1	2–1–1	**12–7–1**
Washington	1–2–1	3–1	1–1–2	3–1	2–2	**10–7–3**

== Schedule and results ==
1976–77 regular season
October

Game	Result	Date	Score	Opponent	Record
1	T	October 6, 1976	2–2	@ Cleveland Barons (1976–77)	0–0–1
2	L	October 7, 1976	2–4	@ Atlanta Flames (1976–77)	0–1–1
3	W	October 9, 1976	7–4	@ Pittsburgh Penguins (1976–77)	1–1–1
4	L	October 10, 1976	0–1	@ Philadelphia Flyers (1976–77)	1–2–1
5	T	October 13, 1976	4–4	@ Toronto Maple Leafs (1976–77)	1–2–2
6	W	October 16, 1976	7–1	Washington Capitals (1976–77)	2–2–2
7	W	October 17, 1976	6–2	St. Louis Blues (1976–77)	3–2–2
8	W	October 20, 1976	4–2	@ New York Rangers (1976–77)	4–2–2
9	T	October 21, 1976	5–5	@ Washington Capitals (1976–77)	4–2–3
10	L	October 23, 1976	2–4	Boston Bruins (1976–77)	4–3–3
11	W	October 26, 1976	3–2	Detroit Red Wings (1976–77)	5–3–3
12	W	October 28, 1976	5–1	Atlanta Flames (1976–77)	6–3–3
13	W	October 30, 1976	4–3	Cleveland Barons (1976–77)	7–3–3

November

Game	Result	Date	Score	Opponent	Record
14	L	November 2, 1976	1–7	@ Pittsburgh Penguins (1976–77)	7–4–3
15	W	November 3, 1976	4–2	@ Cleveland Barons (1976–77)	8–4–3
16	L	November 5, 1976	1–4	@ Vancouver Canucks (1976–77)	8–5–3
17	T	November 6, 1976	3–3	New York Rangers (1976–77)	8–5–4
18	T	November 10, 1976	2–2	Toronto Maple Leafs (1976–77)	8–5–5
19	T	November 13, 1976	3–3	@ Detroit Red Wings (1976–77)	8–5–6
20	L	November 14, 1976	4–5	@ Chicago Black Hawks (1976–77)	8–6–6
21	T	November 16, 1976	0–0	Cleveland Barons (1976–77)	8–6–7
22	L	November 18, 1976	1–3	New York Islanders (1976–77)	8–7–7
23	L	November 20, 1976	3–4	Buffalo Sabres (1976–77)	8–8–7
24	L	November 24, 1976	4–5	Chicago Black Hawks (1976–77)	8–9–7
25	L	November 27, 1976	3–4	Montreal Canadiens (1976–77)	8–10–7
26	T	November 28, 1976	6–6	@ Colorado Rockies (1976–77)	8–10–8

December

Game	Result	Date	Score	Opponent	Record
27	L	December 1, 1976	3–6	@ Toronto Maple Leafs (1976–77)	8–11–8
28	T	December 2, 1976	3–3	@ Montreal Canadiens (1976–77)	8–11–9
29	W	December 4, 1976	4–1	Detroit Red Wings (1976–77)	9–11–9
30	T	December 8, 1976	3–3	Colorado Rockies (1976–77)	9–11–10
31	L	December 11, 1976	2–4	Buffalo Sabres (1976–77)	9–12–10
32	W	December 14, 1976	4–2	@ Washington Capitals (1976–77)	10–12–10
33	W	December 15, 1976	3–1	@ Atlanta Flames (1976–77)	11–12–10
34	L	December 18, 1976	0–2	Montreal Canadiens (1976–77)	11–13–10
35	L	December 22, 1976	2–3	Vancouver Canucks (1976–77)	11–14–10
36	W	December 27, 1976	7–4	@ Detroit Red Wings (1976–77)	12–14–10
37	L	December 28, 1976	3–8	@ Minnesota North Stars (1976–77)	12–15–10
38	L	December 30, 1976	0–2	Philadelphia Flyers (1976–77)	12–16–10

January

Game	Result	Date	Score	Opponent	Record
39	W	January 1, 1977	5–2	Boston Bruins (1976–77)	13–16–10
40	L	January 4, 1977	3–4	@ St. Louis Blues (1976–77)	13–17–10
41	L	January 5, 1977	2–5	@ Minnesota North Stars (1976–77)	13–18–10
42	L	January 8, 1977	1–6	@ Philadelphia Flyers (1976–77)	13–19–10
43	W	January 9, 1977	5–4	@ New York Rangers (1976–77)	14–19–10
44	L	January 12, 1977	2–3	@ Toronto Maple Leafs (1976–77)	14–20–10
45	L	January 13, 1977	3–4	@ Boston Bruins (1976–77)	14–21–10
46	L	January 15, 1977	0–6	@ Montreal Canadiens (1976–77)	14–22–10
47	W	January 18, 1977	6–3	Toronto Maple Leafs (1976–77)	15–22–10
48	W	January 20, 1977	5–3	Pittsburgh Penguins (1976–77)	16–22–10
49	W	January 22, 1977	6–0	New York Rangers (1976–77)	17–22–10
50	L	January 26, 1977	2–3	Minnesota North Stars (1976–77)	17–23–10
51	W	January 29, 1977	4–0	@ New York Islanders (1976–77)	18–23–10

February

Game	Result	Date	Score	Opponent	Record
52	W	February 2, 1977	7–2	Washington Capitals (1976–77)	19–23–10
53	T	February 5, 1977	3–3	Montreal Canadiens (1976–77)	19–23–11
54	L	February 8, 1977	1–4	@ New York Islanders (1976–77)	19–24–11
55	L	February 9, 1977	3–6	@ Cleveland Barons (1976–77)	19–25–11
56	L	February 12, 1977	2–3	Pittsburgh Penguins (1976–77)	19–26–11
57	W	February 15, 1977	3–0	New York Islanders (1976–77)	20–26–11
58	L	February 17, 1977	3–4	Atlanta Flames (1976–77)	20–27–11
59	W	February 19, 1977	2–0	Boston Bruins (1976–77)	21–27–11
60	W	February 22, 1977	4–0	St. Louis Blues (1976–77)	22–27–11
61	T	February 24, 1977	2–2	Vancouver Canucks (1976–77)	22–27–12
62	W	February 26, 1977	4–3	@ Detroit Red Wings (1976–77)	23–27–12
63	W	February 27, 1977	5–1	@ Buffalo Sabres (1976–77)	24–27–12

March

Game	Result	Date	Score	Opponent	Record
64	W	March 1, 1977	3–2	@ Washington Capitals (1976–77)	25–27–12
65	W	March 2, 1977	5–0	@ Pittsburgh Penguins (1976–77)	26–27–12
66	L	March 3, 1977	2–7	@ Buffalo Sabres (1976–77)	26–28–12
67	T	March 5, 1977	3–3	Pittsburgh Penguins (1976–77)	26–28–13
68	W	March 8, 1977	7–1	Chicago Black Hawks (1976–77)	27–28–13
69	W	March 10, 1977	6–0	Washington Capitals (1976–77)	28–28–13
70	T	March 13, 1977	2–2	@ Boston Bruins (1976–77)	28–28–14
71	L	March 14, 1977	0–3	@ Montreal Canadiens (1976–77)	28–29–14
72	W	March 17, 1977	3–2	Detroit Red Wings (1976–77)	29–29–14
73	L	March 19, 1977	3–5	Philadelphia Flyers (1976–77)	29–30–14
74	L	March 22, 1977	2–4	@ St. Louis Blues (1976–77)	29–31–14
75	W	March 23, 1977	3–1	@ Chicago Black Hawks (1976–77)	30–31–14
76	W	March 26, 1977	6–4	Buffalo Sabres (1976–77)	31–31–14
77	T	March 29, 1977	3–3	@ Vancouver Canucks (1976–77)	31–31–15
78	W	March 31, 1977	7–5	Colorado Rockies (1976–77)	32–31–15

April

Game	Result	Date	Score	Opponent	Record
79	W	April 2, 1977	7–2	Minnesota North Stars (1976–77)	33–31–15
80	W	April 3, 1977	6–4	@ Colorado Rockies (1976–77)	34–31–15

Legend: Win (2 points) Loss (0 points) Tie (1 point)

== Playoffs ==
For the second straight year, the Kings faced the Atlanta Flames in the mini series. And for the second year in a row, the Kings scored in the first minute of game 1 and won 5–2. But unlike the prior year, they lost game 2 in Atlanta 3–2, forcing a deciding game 3 back in L.A. Vachon was brilliant as the Kings took a 3–1 lead into the 3rd period. But Atlanta scored late to make it 3–2, and the issue wasn't decided until the Kings got an empty net goal for a 4–2 win.

For the second straight year, the Kings faced the Boston Bruins in the quarter finals and again were heavy underdogs. Boston dominated the first two games in Boston, winning 8–3 and 6–2. The Kings offense woke up when they returned to L.A., but the defense continued to struggle and the Kings lost 7–6 to fall behind 3 games to none. Vachon looked exhausted (he had now played 74 games) and the Kings could not cope with Boston's size advantage. But they managed to outskate Boston in a 7–4 game 4 win, but it seemed a formality to go back to Boston for game 5. It was in that game that Vachon played one of the great games in playoff history. The Kings were badly outshot but in the words of Boston goalie Gerry Cheevers, "Vachon did everything but stand on his head to make great save after great save." The Kings led 2–1 and clinched the game with an empty netter, forcing a game 6 in Los Angeles. In that game, the Kings fell behind 3–0 but battled back to tie the game in the 3rd period at 3. Then, as Kings defenseman Dave Hutchison went to clear the puck on a Boston power play, he broke his stick on the ice, turned the puck over, and Boston scored to win the game 4–3 and the series 4 games to 2.

== Awards and records ==
Lady Byng Memorial Trophy – Marcel Dionne

All NHL 2nd team – Rogie Vachon, Goalie

== Transactions ==
The Kings were involved in the following transactions during the 1976–77 season.

=== Trades ===
May 28, 1976	To Los Angeles Kings John Campbell	To New York Rangers Mark Heaslip
June 12, 1976	To Los Angeles Kings Glenn Goldup; 3rd round pick in 1978 – Doug Derkson	To Montreal Canadiens 3rd round pick in 1977 – Moe Robinson; 1st round pick in 1978 – Dan Geoffrion
September 29, 1976	To Los Angeles Kings Dave Schultz	To Philadelphia Flyers 4th round pick in 1977 – Yves Guillemette; 2nd round pick in 1978 – Merlin Malinowski
October 18, 1976	To Los Angeles Kings 5th round pick in 1977 – Julian Baretta	To Pittsburgh Penguins Mike Corrigan
January 22, 1977	To Los Angeles Kings Jim Moxey; Gary Simmons	To Cleveland Barons Gary Edwards; Juha Widing

=== Free agents lost ===
October 25, 1976	To Edmonton Oilers (WHA) Bob Nevin

== Draft picks ==
Los Angeles's draft picks at the 1976 NHL amateur draft held in Montreal.

Round	#	Player	Nationality	College/Junior/Club team (League)
2	21	Steve Clippingdale	Canada	New Westminster Bruins (WCHL)
3	49	Don Moores	Canada	Kamloops Chiefs (WCHL)
4	67	Bob Mears	Canada	Kingston Canadians (OMJHL)
5	85	Rob Palmer	Canada	University of Michigan (WCHA)
6	103	Larry McRae	Canada	Windsor Spitfires (OMJHL)

== See also ==
- 1976–77 NHL season
