= 1976–77 Cleveland Barons season =

NHL season

1976–77 Cleveland Barons
- Division: 4th Adams
- Conference: 7th Wales
- 1976–77 record: 25–42–13
- Home record: 14–17–9
- Road record: 11–25–4
- Goals for: 240
- Goals against: 292

Team information
- General manager: Bill McCreary
- Coach: Jack Evans
- Captain: Jim Neilson and Bob Stewart
- Alternate captains: None
- Arena: Coliseum at Richfield

Team leaders
- Goals: Dennis Maruk (28)
- Assists: Dennis Maruk (50)
- Points: Dennis Maruk (78)
- Penalty minutes: Len Frig (213)
- Plus/minus: Jim Pappin (+5)
- Wins: Gilles Meloche (19)
- Goals against average: Gilles Meloche (3.47)

The 1976–77 Cleveland Barons season was the first season for this franchise in Cleveland, after nine seasons in the San Francisco Bay Area as the Oakland Seals/California Golden Seals. The Barons displaced the World Hockey Association's Cleveland Crusaders, who elected to relocate to Minnesota and become the Minnesota Fighting Saints.

The Barons played in the tough Adams Division and spent most of the season in last place. Midway through the season, majority owner Melvin Swig announced the team might have trouble finishing the season. The club missed payroll twice in February, and only a loan from the league and NHLPA kept the team afloat. Following the season, minority owner George Gund III purchased a controlling interest in the club.

== Offseason ==
=== Amateur draft ===
The franchise participated in the 1976 Amateur Draft as the California Golden Seals, the move to Cleveland not being approved until mid-July.

Round	Pick	Player	Nationality	College/junior/club team
1	5.	Bjorn Johansson	Sweden	HK Örebro (Sweden Division 1)
2	23.	Vern Stenlund	Canada	London Knights (OMJHL)
3	41.	Mike Fidler	United States	Boston University Terriers (ECAC)
4	59.	Warren Young	Canada	Michigan Tech Huskies (WCHA)
5	77.	Darcy Regier	Canada	Lethbridge Broncos (WCHL)
5	79.	Cal Sandbeck	United States	University of Denver Pioneers (WCHA)
6	95.	Jouni Rinne	Finland	Lukko (SM-liiga)

== Regular season ==
Adams Division
	GP	W	L	T	GF	GA	Pts
**Boston Bruins**	80	49	23	8	312	240	106
**Buffalo Sabres**	80	48	24	8	301	220	104
**Toronto Maple Leafs**	80	33	32	15	301	285	81
Cleveland Barons	80	25	42	13	240	292	63

Note: GP = Games played, W = Wins, L = Losses, T = Ties, Pts = Points, GF = Goals for, GA = Goals against
Note: Teams that qualified for the playoffs are highlighted in bold.

=== Record vs. opponents ===
Adams Division record vs. opponents

**Vs. Wales Conference**

**Vs. Campbell Conference**

**Vs. Adams Division**

1976–77 NHL records
Team	**BOS**	**BUF**	**CLE**	**TOR**	**Total**
Boston	—	3–3	5–1	3–2–1	**11–6–1**
Buffalo	3–3	—	5–1	5–0–1	**13–4–1**
Cleveland	1–5	1–5	—	2–4	**4–14–0**
Toronto	2–3–1	0–5–1	4–2	—	**6–10–1**

**Vs. Norris Division**

1976–77 NHL records
Team	**DET**	**LAK**	**MTL**	**PIT**	**WSH**	**Total**
Boston	4–1	2–2–1	3–2	3–1–1	4–0–1	**16–6–3**
Buffalo	4–1	3–2	2–2–1	0–4–1	4–1	**13–10–2**
Cleveland	2–3	1–2–2	0–5	0–3–2	5–0	**8–13–4**
Toronto	3–1–1	2–1–2	1–2–2	1–2–2	2–3	**9–9–7**

**Vs. Patrick Division**

1976–77 NHL records
Team	**ATL**	**NYI**	**NYR**	**PHI**	**Total**
Boston	2–2	1–2–1	4–0–1	1–3	**8–7–2**
Buffalo	2–1–1	1–3–1	4–0	2–2	**9–6–2**
Cleveland	2–1–1	0–3–1	0–3–1	1–3–1	**3–10–4**
Toronto	4–1	2–1–1	1–2–1	1–2–1	**8–6–3**

**Vs. Smythe Division**

1976–77 NHL records
Team	**CHI**	**COL**	**MIN**	**STL**	**VAN**	**Total**
Boston	4–0	3–1	1–2–1	2–1–1	4–0	**14–4–2**
Buffalo	3–1	3–0–1	2–1–1	2–2	3–0–1	**13–4–3**
Cleveland	3–1	2–1–1	1–1–2	2–1–1	2–1–1	**10–5–5**
Toronto	1–2–1	2–1–1	3–1	2–2	2–1–1	**10–7–3**

== Schedule and results ==
=== Regular season ===
1976–77 regular season
October: 3–5–2 (home: 3–2–1; road: 2–2–1)

Game	Date	Opponent	Score	Decision	Arena	Attendance	Record	Pts	Recap
1	October 6, 1976	Los Angeles	2–2	Meloche	Coliseum at Richfield	8,899	0–0–1	1	
2	October 9, 1976	Washington	6–3	Simmons	Coliseum at Richfield	5,209	1–0–1	3	
3	October 10, 1976	@ Boston	3–4	Meloche	Boston Garden	10,269	1–1–1	3	
4	October 13, 1976	Atlanta	2–4	Meloche	Coliseum at Richfield	3,812	1–2–1	3	
5	October 16, 1976	@ N.Y. Islanders	4–4	Simmons	Nassau Veterans Memorial Coliseum	14,289	1–2–2	4	
6	October 19, 1976	Chicago	3–0	Meloche	Coliseum at Richfield	5,653	2–2–2	6	
7	October 21, 1976	St. Louis	6–2	Simmons	Coliseum at Richfield	3,453	3–2–2	8	
8	October 26, 1976	N.Y. Rangers	2–5	Meloche	Coliseum at Richfield	4,716	3–3–2	8	
9	October 28, 1976	@ Vancouver	1–3	Meloche	Pacific Coliseum		3–4–2	8	
10	October 30, 1976	@ Los Angeles	3–4	Simmons	The Forum	10,840	3–5–2	8	

November: 3–6–4 (home: 1–4–1; road: 2–2–3)

Game	Date	Opponent	Score	Decision	Arena	Attendance	Record	Pts	Recap
11	November 1, 1976	Toronto	3–6	Meloche	Coliseum at Richfield	3,488	3–6–2	8	
12	November 3, 1976	Los Angeles	2–4	Simmons	Coliseum at Richfield	3,157	3–7–2	8	
13	November 5, 1976	Philadelphia	6–4	Meloche	Coliseum at Richfield	10,297	4–7–2	10	
14	November 7, 1976	Pittsburgh	2–2	Simmons	Coliseum at Richfield	4,617	4–7–3	11	
15	November 10, 1976	@ Colorado	2–1	Meloche	McNichols Sports Arena	6,447	5–7–3	13	
16	November 12, 1976	@ Atlanta	3–3	Simmons	The Omni	9,431	5–7–4	14	
17	November 14, 1976	@ Washington	3–2	Meloche	Capital Centre	7,287	6–7–4	16	
18	November 16, 1976	@ Los Angeles	0–0	Simmons	The Forum	9,724	6–7–5	17	
19	November 17, 1976	@ Minnesota	3–3	Meloche	Met Center	7,311	6–7–6	18	
20	November 19, 1976	@ Detroit	2–5	Simmons	Detroit Olympia	8,092	6–8–6	18	
21	November 24, 1976	Montreal	1–8	Meloche	Coliseum at Richfield	11,774	6–9–6	18	
22	November 26, 1976	Pittsburgh	1–3	Simmons	Coliseum at Richfield	6,374	6–10–6	18	
23	November 28, 1976	@ Toronto	1–5	Meloche	Maple Leaf Gardens	16,485	6–11–6	18	

December: 5–10–1 (home: 3–2–1; road: 2–8–0)

Game	Date	Opponent	Score	Decision	Arena	Attendance	Record	Pts	Recap
24	December 1, 1976	@ Colorado	3–5	Simmons	McNichols Sports Arena	3,373	6–12–6	18	
25	December 3, 1976	St. Louis	2–2	Meloche	Coliseum at Richfield	3,444	6–12–7	19	
26	December 5, 1976	@ Philadelphia	2–6	Simmons	Spectrum	17,077	6–13–7	19	
27	December 6, 1976	@ Montreal	0–1	Meloche	Montreal Forum	15,821	6–14–7	19	
28	December 8, 1976	Buffalo	1–5	Meloche	Coliseum at Richfield	3,960	6–15–7	19	
29	December 10, 1976	Washington	7–1	Meloche	Coliseum at Richfield	3,774	7–15–7	21	
30	December 11, 1976	@ Washington	4–2	Meloche	Capital Centre	12,001	8–15–7	23	
31	December 15, 1976	Detroit	7–3	Meloche	Coliseum at Richfield	3,220	9–15–7	25	
32	December 16, 1976	@ Pittsburgh	4–5	Meloche	Civic Arena	7,127	9–16–7	25	
33	December 18, 1976	Boston	6–4	Meloche	Coliseum at Richfield	7,222	10–16–7	27	
34	December 19, 1976	@ N.Y. Rangers	2–3	Meloche	Madison Square Garden	17,500	10–17–7	27	
35	December 22, 1976	Minnesota	4–3	Meloche	Coliseum at Richfield	4,496	11–18–7	29	
36	December 26, 1976	@ Boston	3–6	Meloche	Boston Garden	13,703	11–18–7	29	
37	December 27, 1976	@ Montreal	2–4	Meloche	Montreal Forum	16,851	11–19–7	29	
38	December 29, 1976	Toronto	2–6	Meloche	Coliseum at Richfield	5,464	11–20–7	29	
39	December 31, 1976	@ Detroit	2–4	Simmons	Detroit Olympia	10,107	11–21–7	29	

January: 4–6–1 (home: 1–3–1; road: 3–3–0)

Game	Date	Opponent	Score	Decision	Arena	Attendance	Record	Pts	Recap
40	January 1, 1977	Philadelphia	2–7	Simmons	Coliseum at Richfield	5,331	11–22–7	29	
41	January 5, 1977	Boston	2–3	Meloche	Coliseum at Richfield	4,166	11–23–7	29	
42	January 7, 1977	Vancouver	8–4	Meloche	Coliseum at Richfield	5,368	12–23–7	31	
43	January 9, 1977	@ Buffalo	4–7	Meloche	Buffalo Memorial Auditorium	16,433	12–24–7	31	
44	January 12, 1977	Detroit	3–1	Meloche	Coliseum at Richfield	3,429	13–24–7	33	
45	January 15, 1977	@ Vancouver	4–2	Meloche	Pacific Coliseum		14–24–7	35	
46	January 19, 1977	N.Y. Rangers	3–3	Meloche	Coliseum at Richfield	4,818	14–24–8	36	
47	January 21, 1977	Boston	2–5	Meloche	Coliseum at Richfield	6,371	14–25–8	36	
48	January 23, 1977	@ Buffalo	0–3	Edwards	Buffalo Memorial Auditorium	16,433	12–26–8	36	
49	January 29, 1977	@ Detroit	3–4	Meloche	Detroit Olympia	8,197	15–26–8	38	
50	January 30, 1977	@ Chicago	3–9	Edwards	Chicago Stadium		15–27–8	38	

February: 4–7–2 (home: 3–4–2; road: 1–3–0)

Game	Date	Opponent	Score	Decision	Arena	Attendance	Record	Pts	Recap
51	February 1, 1977	Montreal	3–7	Meloche	Coliseum at Richfield	5,127	15–28–8	38	
52	February 3, 1977	Pittsburgh	0–0	Edwards	Coliseum at Richfield	4,179	15–28–9	39	
53	February 5, 1977	Chicago	3–2	Meloche	Coliseum at Richfield	5,236	16–28–9	41	
54	February 9, 1977	Los Angeles	6–3	Edwards	Coliseum at Richfield	3,225	17–28–9	43	
55	February 11, 1977	Colorado	3–0	Meloche	Coliseum at Richfield	5,112	18–28–9	45	
56	February 13, 1977	@ Boston	2–4	Edwards	Boston Garden	10,295	18–29–9	45	
57	February 16, 1977	Toronto	3–5	Edwards	Coliseum at Richfield	4,308	18–30–9	45	
58	February 18, 1977	Colorado	3–3	Meloche	Coliseum at Richfield	5,191	18–30–10	46	
59	February 20, 1977	@ Pittsburgh	1–4	Edwards	Civic Arena	10,599	18–31–10	46	
60	February 23, 1977	Buffalo	3–5	Edwards	Coliseum at Richfield	3,185	18–32–10	46	
61	February 25, 1977	N.Y. Islanders	1–2	Meloche	Coliseum at Richfield	6,449	18–33–10	46	
62	February 26, 1977	@ Montreal	3–5	Meloche	Montreal Forum	16,734	18–34–10	46	
63	February 28, 1977	@ St. Louis	5–2	Meloche	The Checkerdome	15,467	19–34–10	48	

March: 5–7–3 (home: 1–2–3; road: 2–5–0)

Game	Date	Opponent	Score	Decision	Arena	Attendance	Record	Pts	Recap
64	March 2, 1977	@ Toronto	4–1	Edwards	Maple Leaf Gardens	16,408	20–34–10	50	
65	March 5, 1977	@ Atlanta	2–1	Meloche	The Omni	13,341	21–34–10	52	
66	March 6, 1977	@ N.Y. Rangers	3–4	Edwards	Madison Square Garden	17,500	21–35–10	52	
67	March 10, 1977	@ Philadelphia	2–7	Meloche	Spectrum	17,077	21–36–10	52	
68	March 12, 1977	@ N.Y. Islanders	3–8	Edwards	Nassau Veterans Memorial Coliseum	15,317	21–37–10	52	
69	March 15, 1977	@ Washington	5–1	Meloche	Capital Centre	7,374	22–37–10	54	
70	March 16, 1977	Buffalo	2–6	Edwards	Coliseum at Richfield	11,189	22–38–10	54	
71	March 18, 1977	Minnesota	2–2	Edwards	Coliseum at Richfield	9,165	22–38–11	55	
72	March 20, 1977	Atlanta	5–4	Meloche	Coliseum at Richfield	10,829	23–38–11	57	
73	March 21, 1977	@ Toronto	7–2	Edwards	Maple Leaf Gardens	16,485	24–38–11	59	
74	March 23, 1977	@ Buffalo	2–4	Edwards	Buffalo Memorial Auditorium	16,433	22–38–10	59	
75	March 25, 1977	Vancouver	4–4	Edwards	Coliseum at Richfield	11,816	24–39–12	60	
76	March 27, 1977	N.Y. Islanders	3–6	Meloche	Coliseum at Richfield	10,794	24–39–12	60	
77	March 29, 1977	@ Minnesota	2–4	Edwards	Met Center	9,548	24–39–12	60	
78	March 30, 1977	Philadelphia	3–3	Meloche	Coliseum at Richfield	10,216	24–40–13	61	

April: 1–1–0 (home: 0–0–0; road: 1–1–0)

Game	Date	Opponent	Score	Decision	Arena	Attendance	Record	Pts	Recap
79	April 2, 1977	@ St. Louis	2–9	Edwards	The Checkerdome	16,841	24–42–13	61	
80	April 3, 1977	@ Chicago	4–2	Meloche	Chicago Stadium		25–42–13	63	

Legend: Win (2 points) Loss (0 points) Tie (1 point)

Detailed records

Wales Conference
Opponent	Home	Away	Total	Pts.	Goals scored	Goals allowed
Adams Division
Boston Bruins	1–2–0	0–3–0	1–5–0	2	18	26
Buffalo Sabres	0–3–0	1–2–0	1–5–0	2	15	27
Cleveland Barons	–	–	–	–	–	–
Toronto Maple Leafs	0–3–0	2–1–0	2–4–0	4	20	25
	1–8–0	3–6–0	4–14–0	8	53	78
Norris Division
Detroit Red Wings	2–0–0	0–3–0	2–3–0	4	17	17
Los Angeles Kings	1–1–1	0–1–1	1–2–2	4	13	13
Montreal Canadiens	0–2–0	0–3–0	0–5–0	0	9	25
Pittsburgh Penguins	0–1–2	0–2–0	0–3–2	2	12	14
Washington Capitals	2–0–0	3–0–0	5–0–0	10	25	9
	5–4–3	3–9–1	8–13–4	20	76	78

Campbell Conference
Opponent	Home	Away	Total	Pts.	Goals scored	Goals allowed
Patrick Division
Atlanta Flames	1–1–0	1–0–1	2–1–1	5	12	12
New York Islanders	0–2–0	0–1–1	0–3–1	1	11	20
New York Rangers	0–1–1	0–2–0	0–3–1	1	10	15
Philadelphia Flyers	1–1–1	0–2–0	1–3–1	3	15	27
	1–5–2	2–5–2	3–10–4	10	48	74
Smythe Division
Chicago Black Hawks	2–0–0	1–1–0	3–1–0	6	13	13
Colorado Rockies	1–0–1	1–1–0	2–1–1	5	15	15
Minnesota North Stars	1–0–1	0–1–0	1–1–2	4	11	12
St. Louis Blues	1–0–1	1–1–0	2–1–1	4	15	15
Vancouver Canucks	1–0–1	1–1–0	2–1–1	5	17	13
	6–0–4	4–5–0	10–5–5	21	71	68

== Player stats ==
=== Skaters ===
Note: GP = Games played; G = Goals; A = Assists; Pts = Points; PIM = Penalties in minutes

			Regular season					Playoffs
#	Player	Pos	GP	G	A	Pts	PIM	GP	G	A	Pts	PIM
21	Dennis Maruk	C	80	28	50	78	68	–	–	–	–	-
25	Al MacAdam	RW	80	22	41	63	68	–	–	–	–	-
9	Wayne Merrick	C	80	18	38	56	25	–	–	–	–	-
20	Bob Murdoch	RW	57	23	19	42	30	–	–	–	–	-
2	Rick Hampton	LW	57	16	24	40	13	–	–	–	–	-
7	Dave Gardner	C	76	16	22	38	9	–	–	–	–	-
12	Mike Fidler	LW	46	17	16	33	17	–	–	–	–	-
3	Mike Christie	D	79	6	27	33	79	–	–	–	–	-
10	Ralph Klassen	C	80	14	18	32	23	–	–	–	–	-
5	Greg Smith	D	74	9	17	26	65	–	–	–	–	-
28	Frank Spring	RW	26	11	10	21	6	–	–	–	–	-
26	Bob Girard	LW	68	11	10	21	33	–	–	–	–	-
24	Brent Meeke	LW	49	8	13	21	4	–	–	–	–	-
15	Jim Neilson	D	47	3	17	20	42	–	–	–	–	-
11	Gary Sabourin	RW	33	7	11	18	4	–	–	–	–	-
19	Jim Moxey^{‡}	RW	35	7	7	14	20	–	–	–	–	-
8	Juha Widing^{†}	C	29	6	8	14	10	–	–	–	–	-
4	Bob Stewart	D	73	1	12	13	108	–	–	–	–	-
8	Jim Pappin	RW	24	2	8	10	8	–	–	–	–	-
6	Len Frig	D	66	2	7	9	213	–	–	–	–	-
16	Fred Ahern	RW	25	4	4	8	20	–	–	–	–	-
8	Phil Roberto	RW	21	3	4	7	8	–	–	–	–	-
18	Glenn Patrick	D	35	2	3	5	70	–	–	–	–	-
17	Ken Kuzyk	RW	13	0	5	5	2	–	–	–	–	-
18	Angie Moretto	C	5	1	2	3	2	–	–	–	–	-
27	Gilles Meloche	G	51	0	3	3	18	–	–	–	–	-
17	Charlie Simmer	LW	24	2	0	2	16	–	–	–	–	-
13	Bjorn Johansson	D	10	1	1	2	4	–	–	–	–	-
8	Gary Holt	LW	2	0	1	1	2	–	–	–	–	-
1	Gary Edwards^{†}	G	17	0	1	1	2	–	–	–	–	-
19	Lyle Bradley	C	2	0	0	0	0	–	–	–	–	-
17	Tom Price^{‡}	D	2	0	0	0	0	–	–	–	–	-
11	Vern Stenlund	C	4	0	0	0	0	–	–	–	–	-
22	Rick Shinske	C	5	0	0	0	2	–	–	–	–	-
31	Gary Simmons^{‡}	G	15	0	0	0	0	–	–	–	–	-

^{†}Denotes player spent time with another team before joining Barons. Stats reflect time with the Barons only. ^{‡}Traded/released mid-season

=== Goaltenders ===
Note: GP = Games played; TOI = Time on ice (minutes); W = Wins; L = Losses; T = Ties; GA = Goals against; SO = Shutouts; GAA = Goals against average

		Regular season								Playoffs
Player	#	GP	TOI	W	L	T	GA	SO	GAA	GP	TOI	W	L	GA	SO	GAA
Gilles Meloche		51	2961	19	24	6	171	2	3.47	–	–	–	–	–	–	-.--
Gary Simmons^{‡}		15	840	2	8	4	51	1	3.64	–	–	–	–	–	–	-.--
Gary Edwards^{†}		17	999	4	10	3	68	2	4.08	–	–	–	–	–	–	-.--

^{†}Denotes player spent time with another team before joining Seals. Stats reflect time with the Seals only. ^{‡}Traded mid-season

== Transactions ==
The Barons were involved in the following transactions during the 1976–77 season:

=== Trades ===
January 22, 1977	To Cleveland Barons Gary Edwards; Juha Widing	To Los Angeles Kings Jim Moxey; Gary Simmons

=== Additions and subtractions ===
Additions
Player	Former team	Via
Ken Kuzyk	Boston University (NCAA)	free agency (September 1976)
Phil Roberto	Colorado Rockies	free agency (1976-12-24)

Subtractions
Player	New team	Via
Tom Price	Pittsburgh Penguins	free agency (1977-02-28)
