= 1976–77 Buffalo Sabres season =

NHL hockey team season

1976–77 Buffalo Sabres
- Division: 2nd Adams
- Conference: 3rd Wales
- 1976–77 record: 48–24–8
- Home record: 28–7–5
- Road record: 18–14–8
- Goals for: 301
- Goals against: 220

Team information
- General manager: Punch Imlach
- Coach: Floyd Smith
- Captain: Jim Schoenfeld
- Alternate captains: None
- Arena: Buffalo Memorial Auditorium
- Average attendance: 16,433

Team leaders
- Goals: Gilbert Perreault (39)
- Assists: Gilbert Perreault (56)
- Points: Gilbert Perreault (95)
- Penalty minutes: Jerry Korab (120)
- Wins: Gerry Desjardins (31)
- Goals against average: Don Edwards (2.51)

The 1976–77 Buffalo Sabres season was the Sabres' seventh season in the National Hockey League (NHL). The Sabres advanced to the second round of the playoffs before losing to the New York Islanders.

== Regular season ==
=== Final standings ===
Adams Division
	GP	W	L	T	GF	GA	Pts
**Boston Bruins**	80	49	23	8	312	240	106
**Buffalo Sabres**	80	48	24	8	301	220	104
**Toronto Maple Leafs**	80	33	32	15	301	285	81
Cleveland Barons	80	25	42	13	240	292	63

Note: GP = Games played, W = Wins, L = Losses, T = Ties, Pts = Points, GF = Goals for, GA = Goals against
Note: Teams that qualified for the playoffs are highlighted in bold.

=== Record vs. opponents ===
Adams Division record vs. opponents

**Vs. Wales Conference**

**Vs. Campbell Conference**

**Vs. Adams Division**

1976–77 NHL records
Team	**BOS**	**BUF**	**CLE**	**TOR**	**Total**
Boston	—	3–3	5–1	3–2–1	**11–6–1**
Buffalo	3–3	—	5–1	5–0–1	**13–4–1**
Cleveland	1–5	1–5	—	2–4	**4–14–0**
Toronto	2–3–1	0–5–1	4–2	—	**6–10–1**

**Vs. Norris Division**

1976–77 NHL records
Team	**DET**	**LAK**	**MTL**	**PIT**	**WSH**	**Total**
Boston	4–1	2–2–1	3–2	3–1–1	4–0–1	**16–6–3**
Buffalo	4–1	3–2	2–2–1	0–4–1	4–1	**13–10–2**
Cleveland	2–3	1–2–2	0–5	0–3–2	5–0	**8–13–4**
Toronto	3–1–1	2–1–2	1–2–2	1–2–2	2–3	**9–9–7**

**Vs. Patrick Division**

1976–77 NHL records
Team	**ATL**	**NYI**	**NYR**	**PHI**	**Total**
Boston	2–2	1–2–1	4–0–1	1–3	**8–7–2**
Buffalo	2–1–1	1–3–1	4–0	2–2	**9–6–2**
Cleveland	2–1–1	0–3–1	0–3–1	1–3–1	**3–10–4**
Toronto	4–1	2–1–1	1–2–1	1–2–1	**8–6–3**

**Vs. Smythe Division**

1976–77 NHL records
Team	**CHI**	**COL**	**MIN**	**STL**	**VAN**	**Total**
Boston	4–0	3–1	1–2–1	2–1–1	4–0	**14–4–2**
Buffalo	3–1	3–0–1	2–1–1	2–2	3–0–1	**13–4–3**
Cleveland	3–1	2–1–1	1–1–2	2–1–1	2–1–1	**10–5–5**
Toronto	1–2–1	2–1–1	3–1	2–2	2–1–1	**10–7–3**

== Schedule and results ==
1976–77 regular season
October

Game	Result	Date	Score	Opponent	Record
1	L	October 9, 1976	0–4	@ Detroit Red Wings (1976–77)	0–1–0
2	W	October 10, 1976	3–1	Montreal Canadiens (1976–77)	1–1–0
3	L	October 13, 1976	3–4	New York Islanders (1976–77)	1–2–0
4	W	October 16, 1976	2–1	@ Minnesota North Stars (1976–77)	2–2–0
5	L	October 17, 1976	5–6	Atlanta Flames (1976–77)	2–3–0
6	W	October 20, 1976	4–0	Vancouver Canucks (1976–77)	3–3–0
7	L	October 23, 1976	2–3	@ Philadelphia Flyers (1976–77)	3–4–0
8	W	October 24, 1976	2–1	Washington Capitals (1976–77)	4–4–0
9	T	October 27, 1976	4–4	Pittsburgh Penguins (1976–77)	4–4–1
10	W	October 31, 1976	4–1	Boston Bruins (1976–77)	5–4–1

November

Game	Result	Date	Score	Opponent	Record
11	L	November 1, 1976	2–3	@ Montreal Canadiens (1976–77)	5–5–1
12	W	November 5, 1976	3–2	@ Washington Capitals (1976–77)	6–5–1
13	W	November 7, 1976	5–3	Philadelphia Flyers (1976–77)	7–5–1
14	W	November 10, 1976	5–0	St. Louis Blues (1976–77)	8–5–1
15	W	November 13, 1976	6–2	@ New York Rangers (1976–77)	9–5–1
16	T	November 14, 1976	4–4	Minnesota North Stars (1976–77)	9–5–2
17	W	November 17, 1976	3–2	@ Vancouver Canucks (1976–77)	10–5–2
18	W	November 20, 1976	4–3	@ Los Angeles Kings (1976–77)	11–5–2
19	T	November 24, 1976	4–4	Vancouver Canucks (1976–77)	11–5–3
20	L	November 27, 1976	2–3	@ St. Louis Blues (1976–77)	11–6–3
21	W	November 28, 1976	3–1	Detroit Red Wings (1976–77)	12–6–3
22	W	November 30, 1976	6–2	@ Boston Bruins (1976–77)	13–6–3

December

Game	Result	Date	Score	Opponent	Record
23	L	December 4, 1976	0–3	@ New York Islanders (1976–77)	13–7–3
24	W	December 5, 1976	5–3	Colorado Rockies (1976–77)	14–7–3
25	W	December 8, 1976	5–1	@ Cleveland Barons (1976–77)	15–7–3
26	L	December 9, 1976	1–2	Pittsburgh Penguins (1976–77)	15–8–3
27	W	December 11, 1976	4–2	@ Los Angeles Kings (1976–77)	16–8–3
28	W	December 14, 1976	6–3	@ Vancouver Canucks (1976–77)	17–8–3
29	W	December 16, 1976	7–2	New York Rangers (1976–77)	18–8–3
30	W	December 18, 1976	4–2	@ New York Islanders (1976–77)	19–8–3
31	W	December 19, 1976	6–1	Detroit Red Wings (1976–77)	20–8–3
32	W	December 22, 1976	4–2	@ Chicago Black Hawks (1976–77)	21–8–3
33	W	December 23, 1976	4–2	Toronto Maple Leafs (1976–77)	22–8–3
34	W	December 26, 1976	5–2	Washington Capitals (1976–77)	23–8–3
35	W	December 29, 1976	6–3	@ Atlanta Flames (1976–77)	24–8–3

January

Game	Result	Date	Score	Opponent	Record
36	L	January 1, 1977	3–6	@ Pittsburgh Penguins (1976–77)	24–9–3
37	T	January 2, 1977	3–3	New York Islanders (1976–77)	24–9–4
38	L	January 5, 1977	1–2	@ Chicago Black Hawks (1976–77)	24–10–4
39	L	January 6, 1977	2–9	Montreal Canadiens (1976–77)	24–11–4
40	W	January 8, 1977	4–2	@ Toronto Maple Leafs (1976–77)	25–11–4
41	W	January 9, 1977	7–4	Cleveland Barons (1976–77)	26–11–4
42	W	January 13, 1977	7–5	New York Rangers (1976–77)	27–11–4
43	L	January 15, 1977	2–5	@ Pittsburgh Penguins (1976–77)	27–12–4
44	W	January 16, 1977	3–0	Colorado Rockies (1976–77)	28–12–4
45	L	January 19, 1977	2–4	Washington Capitals (1976–77)	28–13–4
46	L	January 22, 1977	3–4	@ Minnesota North Stars (1976–77)	28–14–4
47	L	January 23, 1977	0–3	Cleveland Barons (1976–77)	28–15–4
48	T	January 27, 1977	1–1	Atlanta Flames (1976–77)	28–15–5
49	T	January 29, 1977	3–3	@ Montreal Canadiens (1976–77)	28–15–6

February

Game	Result	Date	Score	Opponent	Record
50	L	February 1, 1977	3–6	@ New York Islanders (1976–77)	28–16–6
51	W	February 3, 1977	6–4	@ Colorado Rockies (1976–77)	29–16–6
52	L	February 5, 1977	5–6	@ St. Louis Blues (1976–77)	29–17–6
53	W	February 9, 1977	2–1	@ New York Rangers (1976–77)	30–17–6
54	W	February 10, 1977	4–3	Boston Bruins (1976–77)	31–17–6
55	W	February 13, 1977	6–2	Minnesota North Stars (1976–77)	32–17–6
56	W	February 14, 1977	7–2	Toronto Maple Leafs (1976–77)	33–17–6
57	W	February 16, 1977	3–0	Chicago Black Hawks (1976–77)	34–17–6
58	W	February 19, 1977	2–1	@ Detroit Red Wings (1976–77)	35–17–6
59	L	February 20, 1977	2–4	@ Philadelphia Flyers (1976–77)	35–18–6
60	W	February 23, 1977	5–3	@ Cleveland Barons (1976–77)	36–18–6
61	W	February 24, 1977	2–0	Philadelphia Flyers (1976–77)	37–18–6
62	W	February 26, 1977	6–5	@ Toronto Maple Leafs (1976–77)	38–18–6
63	L	February 27, 1977	1–5	Los Angeles Kings (1976–77)	38–19–6

March

Game	Result	Date	Score	Opponent	Record
64	W	March 2, 1977	6–3	Chicago Black Hawks (1976–77)	39–19–6
65	W	March 3, 1977	7–2	Los Angeles Kings (1976–77)	40–19–6
66	L	March 5, 1977	1–3	@ Boston Bruins (1976–77)	40–20–6
67	W	March 6, 1977	4–1	Montreal Canadiens (1976–77)	41–20–6
68	W	March 9, 1977	6–3	Detroit Red Wings (1976–77)	42–20–6
69	L	March 12, 1977	2–3	@ Pittsburgh Penguins (1976–77)	42–21–6
70	W	March 13, 1977	6–1	Toronto Maple Leafs (1976–77)	43–21–6
71	W	March 16, 1977	6–2	@ Cleveland Barons (1976–77)	44–21–6
72	L	March 17, 1977	2–4	@ Boston Bruins (1976–77)	44–22–6
73	W	March 20, 1977	6–2	@ Washington Capitals (1976–77)	45–22–6
74	W	March 22, 1977	6–3	@ Atlanta Flames (1976–77)	46–22–6
75	W	March 23, 1977	4–2	Cleveland Barons (1976–77)	47–22–6
76	T	March 25, 1977	2–2	@ Colorado Rockies (1976–77)	47–22–7
77	L	March 26, 1977	4–6	@ Los Angeles Kings (1976–77)	47–23–7
78	L	March 30, 1977	3–4	Boston Bruins (1976–77)	47–24–7

April

Game	Result	Date	Score	Opponent	Record
79	T	April 2, 1977	1–1	@ Toronto Maple Leafs (1976–77)	47–24–8
80	W	April 3, 1977	7–3	St. Louis Blues (1976–77)	48–24–8

Legend: Win (2 points) Loss (0 points) Tie (1 point)

== Playoffs ==
=== Preliminary round vs. Minnesota North Stars ===
Game 1 (11-Apr-77) Minnesota 2 Buffalo 4

Game 2 (13-Apr-77) Buffalo 7 Minnesota 1

Buffalo wins series 2-0

=== Quarterfinals vs. New York Islanders ===
Game 1: Buffalo 2 New York 4

Game 2: Buffalo 2 New York 4

Game 3: New York 4 Buffalo 3

Game 4: New York 4 Buffalo 3

New York wins series 4-0

== Draft picks ==
Buffalo's draft picks at the 1976 NHL amateur draft held in Montreal.

Round	#	Player	Nationality	College/Junior/Club team (League)
2	33	Joe Kowal	Canada	Hamilton Fincups (OMJHL)
4	69	Rocky Maze	Canada	Edmonton Oil Kings (WCHL)
5	87	Ron Roscoe	Canada	Hamilton Fincups (OMJHL)
6	105	Don Lemieux	Canada	Trois-Rivières Draveurs (QMJHL)

== See also ==
- 1976–77 NHL season
