= 1976–77 Atlanta Flames season =

NHL team season

1976–77 Atlanta Flames
- Division: 3rd Patrick
- Conference: 3rd Campbell
- 1976–77 record: 34–34–12
- Home record: 22–11–7
- Road record: 12–23–5
- Goals for: 264
- Goals against: 265

Team information
- General manager: Cliff Fletcher
- Coach: Fred Creighton
- Captain: Pat Quinn
- Alternate captains: None
- Arena: Omni Coliseum

Team leaders
- Goals: Willi Plett (33)
- Assists: Tom Lysiak (51)
- Points: Tom Lysiak (81)
- Penalty minutes: Willi Plett (123)
- Wins: Dan Bouchard, Phil Myre (17)
- Goals against average: Phil Myre (3.07)

The 1976–77 Atlanta Flames season was the fifth season for the franchise.

== Regular season ==
Patrick Division
	GP	W	L	T	GF	GA	Pts
**Philadelphia Flyers**	80	48	16	16	323	213	112
**New York Islanders**	80	47	21	12	288	193	106
**Atlanta Flames**	80	34	34	12	264	265	80
New York Rangers	80	29	37	14	272	310	72

Note: GP = Games played, W = Wins, L = Losses, T = Ties, Pts = Points, GF = Goals for, GA = Goals against
Note: Teams that qualified for the playoffs are highlighted in bold.

=== Record vs. opponents ===
Patrick Division record vs. opponents

**Vs. Campbell Conference**

**Vs. Wales Conference**

**Vs. Patrick Division**

1976–77 NHL records
Team	**ATL**	**NYI**	**NYR**	**PHI**	**Total**
Atlanta	—	0–6	4–1–1	2–2–2	**6–9–3**
N.Y. Islanders	6–0	—	4–1–1	3–2–1	**13–3–2**
N.Y. Rangers	1–4–1	1–4–1	—	0–2–4	**2–10–6**
Philadelphia	2–2–2	2–3–1	2–0–4	—	**6–5–7**

**Vs. Smythe Division**

1976–77 NHL records
Team	**CHI**	**COL**	**MIN**	**STL**	**VAN**	**Total**
Atlanta	3–2	3–1–1	2–1–2	4–1	1–3–1	**13–8–4**
N.Y. Islanders	3–1–1	5–0	3–1–1	3–1–1	4–1	**18–4–3**
N.Y. Rangers	2–2–1	3–1–1	5–0	2–2–1	3–2	**15–7–3**
Philadelphia	3–0–2	5–0	3–0–2	5–0	4–0–1	**20–0–5**

**Vs. Adams Division**

1976–77 NHL records
Team	**BOS**	**BUF**	**CLE**	**TOR**	**Total**
Atlanta	2–2	1–2–1	1–2–1	1–4	**5–10–2**
N.Y. Islanders	2–1–1	3–1–1	3–0–1	1–2–1	**9–4–4**
N.Y. Rangers	0–4–1	0–4	3–0–1	2–1–1	**5–9–3**
Philadelphia	3–1	2–2	3–1–1	2–1–1	**10–5–2**

**Vs. Norris Division**

1976–77 NHL records
Team	**DET**	**LAK**	**MTL**	**PIT**	**WSH**	**Total**
Atlanta	2–1–1	2–2	0–3–1	3–0–1	3–1	**10–7–3**
N.Y. Islanders	2–2	2–2	0–4	2–2	1–0–3	**7–10–3**
N.Y. Rangers	3–1	0–3–1	1–3	1–2–1	2–2	**7–11–2**
Philadelphia	3–1	4–0	0–4	3–1	2–0–2	**12–6–2**

== Schedule and results ==
1976–77 regular season
October

Game	Result	Date	Score	Opponent	Record	Attendance
1	L	October 5, 1976	5–6	@ Washington Capitals (1976–77)	0–1–0	13,152
2	W	October 7, 1976	4–2	Los Angeles Kings (1976–77)	1–1–0	9,140
3	W	October 9, 1976	4–3	Philadelphia Flyers (1976–77)	2–1–0	13,091
4	L	October 12, 1976	0–7	@ New York Islanders (1976–77)	2–2–0	12,331
5	W	October 13, 1976	4–2	@ Cleveland Barons (1976–77)	3–2–0	3,812
6	W	October 15, 1976	2–1	Pittsburgh Penguins (1976–77)	4–2–0	9,336
7	W	October 17, 1976	6–5	@ Buffalo Sabres (1976–77)	5–2–0	16,433
8	L	October 20, 1976	3–4	@ Minnesota North Stars (1976–77)	5–3–0	7,130
9	L	October 22, 1976	3–5	Vancouver Canucks (1976–77)	5–4–0	9,702
10	T	October 24, 1976	3–3	@ Pittsburgh Penguins (1976–77)	5–4–1	7,787
11	L	October 27, 1976	2–4	@ Colorado Rockies (1976–77)	5–5–1	3,763
12	L	October 28, 1976	1–5	@ Los Angeles Kings (1976–77)	5–6–1	9,104
13	T	October 30, 1976	3–3	@ Vancouver Canucks (1976–77)	5–6–2	15,610

November

Game	Result	Date	Score	Opponent	Record	Attendance
14	W	November 3, 1976	7–0	Washington Capitals (1976–77)	6–6–2	8,146
15	L	November 5, 1976	2–4	Toronto Maple Leafs (1976–77)	6–7–2	10,259
16	T	November 7, 1976	0–0	@ Detroit Red Wings (1976–77)	6–7–3	8,810
17	T	November 10, 1976	2–2	Montreal Canadiens (1976–77)	6–7–4	11,235
18	T	November 12, 1976	3–3	Cleveland Barons (1976–77)	6–7–5	9,431
19	W	November 13, 1976	5–3	@ St. Louis Blues (1976–77)	7–7–5	15,128
20	W	November 17, 1976	6–3	Colorado Rockies (1976–77)	8–7–5	8,337
21	W	November 19, 1976	5–3	Chicago Black Hawks (1976–77)	9–7–5	12,444
22	L	November 21, 1976	5–6	@ Philadelphia Flyers (1976–77)	9–8–5	17,077
23	W	November 24, 1976	6–2	Washington Capitals (1976–77)	10–8–5	9,287
24	W	November 26, 1976	5–2	St. Louis Blues (1976–77)	11–8–5	12,193
25	T	November 30, 1976	2–2	New York Rangers (1976–77)	11–8–6	9,262

December

Game	Result	Date	Score	Opponent	Record	Attendance
26	W	December 3, 1976	3–1	Boston Bruins (1976–77)	12–8–6	12,325
27	W	December 4, 1976	1–0	@ St. Louis Blues (1976–77)	13–8–6	14,344
28	W	December 8, 1976	5–0	@ Minnesota North Stars (1976–77)	14–8–6	6,085
29	T	December 10, 1976	3–3	Minnesota North Stars (1976–77)	14–8–7	10,101
30	W	December 11, 1976	3–1	Chicago Black Hawks (1976–77)	15–8–7	11,711
31	L	December 15, 1976	1–3	Los Angeles Kings (1976–77)	15–9–7	11,264
32	L	December 17, 1976	2–4	New York Islanders (1976–77)	15–10–7	9,467
33	L	December 18, 1976	3–6	@ Detroit Red Wings (1976–77)	15–11–7	8,742
34	L	December 20, 1976	2–6	@ Toronto Maple Leafs (1976–77)	15–12–7	16,485
35	W	December 22, 1976	2–1	Detroit Red Wings (1976–77)	16–12–7	14,244
36	W	December 27, 1976	6–2	Colorado Rockies (1976–77)	17–12–7	12,613
37	L	December 29, 1976	3–6	Buffalo Sabres (1976–77)	17–13–7	14,727
38	W	December 31, 1976	4–2	@ New York Rangers (1976–77)	18–13–7	17,500

January

Game	Result	Date	Score	Opponent	Record	Attendance
39	L	January 2, 1977	0–7	@ Montreal Canadiens (1976–77)	18–14–7	15,782
40	W	January 5, 1977	4–1	Vancouver Canucks (1976–77)	19–14–7	11,319
41	L	January 7, 1977	4–5	New York Islanders (1976–77)	19–15–7	14,280
42	L	January 8, 1977	3–6	@ New York Islanders (1976–77)	19–16–7	15,149
43	W	January 12, 1977	6–1	New York Rangers (1976–77)	20–16–7	11,241
44	W	January 14, 1977	3–2	St. Louis Blues (1976–77)	21–16–7	12,436
45	W	January 16, 1977	6–5	@ Pittsburgh Penguins (1976–77)	22–16–7	10,138
46	T	January 20, 1977	4–4	@ Minnesota North Stars (1976–77)	22–16–8	7,479
47	T	January 22, 1977	4–4	Philadelphia Flyers (1976–77)	22–16–9	15,155
48	L	January 23, 1977	0–3	@ Boston Bruins (1976–77)	22–17–9	11,391
49	T	January 27, 1977	1–1	@ Buffalo Sabres (1976–77)	22–17–10	16,433
50	T	January 28, 1977	3–3	Colorado Rockies (1976–77)	22–17–11	13,941
51	W	January 31, 1977	7–3	Toronto Maple Leafs (1976–77)	23–17–11	14,126

February

Game	Result	Date	Score	Opponent	Record	Attendance
52	L	February 2, 1977	2–4	@ Chicago Black Hawks (1976–77)	23–18–11	N/A
53	W	February 4, 1977	6–3	Boston Bruins (1976–77)	24–18–11	15,151
54	L	February 7, 1977	4–7	@ Philadelphia Flyers (1976–77)	24–19–11	17,077
55	L	February 9, 1977	1–5	@ Toronto Maple Leafs (1976–77)	24–20–11	16,416
56	L	February 12, 1977	1–3	@ St. Louis Blues (1976–77)	24–21–11	14,856
57	L	February 13, 1977	2–4	@ Chicago Black Hawks (1976–77)	24–22–11	N/A
58	W	February 17, 1977	4–3	@ Los Angeles Kings (1976–77)	25–22–11	11,059
59	L	February 19, 1977	1–5	@ Vancouver Canucks (1976–77)	25–23–11	N/A
60	L	February 21, 1977	2–3	@ Montreal Canadiens (1976–77)	25–24–11	16,583
61	L	February 23, 1977	2–4	Montreal Canadiens (1976–77)	25–25–11	14,705
62	W	February 25, 1977	6–2	Minnesota North Stars (1976–77)	26–25–11	15,087
63	L	February 26, 1977	2–8	@ New York Islanders (1976–77)	26–26–11	15,317

March

Game	Result	Date	Score	Opponent	Record	Attendance
64	L	March 2, 1977	1–2	Vancouver Canucks (1976–77)	26–27–11	11,609
65	L	March 5, 1977	1–2	Cleveland Barons (1976–77)	26–28–11	13,341
66	W	March 6, 1977	4–2	@ Washington Capitals (1976–77)	27–28–11	10,098
67	L	March 8, 1977	2–3	@ Boston Bruins (1976–77)	27–29–11	10,771
68	L	March 9, 1977	2–6	New York Islanders (1976–77)	27–30–11	11,230
69	W	March 12, 1977	6–3	New York Rangers (1976–77)	28–30–11	15,155
70	W	March 13, 1977	5–3	@ New York Rangers (1976–77)	29–30–11	17,500
71	W	March 15, 1977	7–3	Pittsburgh Penguins (1976–77)	30–30–11	13,161
72	W	March 17, 1977	4–1	@ Philadelphia Flyers (1976–77)	31–30–11	17,077
73	L	March 19, 1977	4–5	@ Toronto Maple Leafs (1976–77)	31–31–11	16,485
74	L	March 20, 1977	4–5	@ Cleveland Barons (1976–77)	31–32–11	10,829
75	L	March 22, 1977	3–6	Buffalo Sabres (1976–77)	31–33–11	12,034
76	W	March 24, 1977	3–1	Detroit Red Wings (1976–77)	32–33–11	14,783
77	W	March 26, 1977	2–1	@ Colorado Rockies (1976–77)	33–33–11	7,338
78	L	March 30, 1977	3–4	@ New York Rangers (1976–77)	33–34–11	17,500

April

Game	Result	Date	Score	Opponent	Record	Attendance
79	W	April 1, 1977	6–4	Chicago Black Hawks (1976–77)	34–34–11	13,931
80	T	April 3, 1977	3–3	Philadelphia Flyers (1976–77)	34–34–12	15,110

Legend: Win (2 points) Loss (0 points) Tie (1 point)

== Player statistics ==
=== Skaters ===
Note: GP = Games played; G = Goals; A = Assists; Pts = Points; PIM = Penalty minutes

		Regular season					Playoffs
Player	#	GP	G	A	Pts	PIM	GP	G	A	Pts	PIM
Tom Lysiak	12	79	30	51	81	52	3	1	3	4	8
Eric Vail	27	78	32	39	71	22	3	1	3	4	0
Willi Plett	25	64	33	23	56	123	3	1	0	1	19
Guy Chouinard	16	80	17	33	50	8	3	2	0	2	0
Curt Bennett	5	76	22	25	47	36	3	1	0	1	7
Ken Houston	6	78	20	24	44	35	3	0	0	0	4
Richard Mulhern	4	79	12	32	44	80	3	0	2	2	5
Bill Clement	10	67	17	26	43	27	3	1	1	2	0
Rey Comeau	18	80	15	18	33	16	3	0	0	0	2
Randy Manery	7	73	5	24	29	33	3	0	0	0	0
Tim Ecclestone	14	78	9	18	27	26	3	0	2	2	6
Ed Kea	19	72	4	21	25	63	3	0	1	1	2
Bobby Simpson	11	72	13	10	23	45	2	0	1	1	0
John Gould^{†}	21	54	8	15	23	8	3	0	0	0	2
Barry Gibbs	2	66	1	16	17	63	3	0	0	0	2
Dave Shand	8	55	5	11	16	62	3	0	0	0	33
Hilliard Graves^{‡}	17	25	8	5	13	17	–	–	–	–	-
Pat Quinn	3	59	1	12	13	58	1	0	0	0	0
Larry Romanchych	21/9	25	4	5	9	4	1	0	0	0	0
Bill Flett^{‡}	9	24	4	4	8	6	–	–	–	–	-
Larry Carriere^{‡}	23	25	2	3	5	16	–	–	–	–	-
Pat Ribble	23	23	2	2	4	31	2	0	0	0	6
Rick Bowness	15	28	0	4	4	29	–	–	–	–	-
Phil Myre	1	43	0	2	2	6	2	0	0	0	0
Dan Bouchard	30	42	0	1	1	9	1	0	0	0	0

^{†}Denotes player spent time with another team before joining Atlanta. Stats reflect time with the Flames only.
^{‡}Traded mid-season

=== Goaltending ===
Note: GP = Games played; TOI = Time on ice (minutes); W = Wins; L = Losses; OT = Overtime/shootout losses; GA = Goals against; SO = Shutouts; GAA = Goals against average

		Regular season								Playoffs
Player	#	GP	TOI	W	L	T	GA	SO	GAA	GP	TOI	W	L	GA	SO	GAA
Phil Myre	1	43	2422	17	17	7	124	3	3.07	2	120	1	1	5	0	2.50
Dan Bouchard	30	42	2378	17	17	5	139	1	3.51	1	60	0	1	5	0	5.00

== Transactions ==
The Flames were involved in the following transactions during the 1976–77 season.

=== Trades ===
December 1, 1976	To Atlanta Flames ----Cash	To Edmonton Oilers (WHA) ----Bill Flett
December 2, 1976	To Atlanta Flames ----John Gould; Kings' 2nd round pick in 1977 (Brian Hill)	To Vancouver Canucks ----Larry Carriere; Hilliard Graves

== Draft picks ==
Round	Pick	Player	Nationality	College/Junior/Club team
1	8.	Dave Shand (D)	Canada	Peterborough Petes (OHA)
1	10.	Harold Phillipoff (LW)	Canada	New Westminster Bruins (WCHL)
2	28.	Bobby Simpson (LW)	Canada	Sherbrooke Beavers (QMJHL)
3	46.	Rick Hodgson (D)	Canada	Calgary Centennials (WCHL)
4	64.	Kent Nilsson (C)	Sweden	Djurgårdens IF (Elitserien)
5	82.	Mark Earp (G)	Canada	Kamloops Chiefs (WCHL)
