= 1976–77 Minnesota North Stars season =

National Hockey League team season

1976–77 Minnesota North Stars
- Division: 2nd Smythe
- Conference: 6th Campbell
- 1976–77 record: 23–39–18
- Home record: 17–14–9
- Road record: 6–25–9
- Goals for: 240
- Goals against: 310

Team information
- General manager: Jack Gordon
- Coach: Ted Harris
- Captain: Bill Hogaboam
- Alternate captains: None
- Arena: Met Center

Team leaders
- Goals: Ernie Hicke (30)
- Assists: Tim Young (66)
- Points: Tim Young (95)
- Penalty minutes: Dennis O'Brien (114)
- Wins: Pete LoPresti (13)
- Goals against average: Pete LoPresti (3.61)

The 1976–77 Minnesota North Stars season was the North Stars' tenth season.

Coached by Ted Harris, the team compiled a record of 23–39–18 for 64 points, to finish the regular season 2nd in the Smythe Division. In the playoffs they lost the preliminary round 2–0 to the Buffalo Sabres.

== Regular season ==
=== Final standings ===
Smythe Division
	GP	W	L	T	GF	GA	Pts
**St. Louis Blues**	80	32	39	9	239	276	73
**Minnesota North Stars**	80	23	39	18	240	310	64
**Chicago Black Hawks**	80	26	43	11	240	298	63
Vancouver Canucks	80	25	42	13	235	294	63
Colorado Rockies	80	20	46	14	226	307	54

Note: GP = Games played, W = Wins, L = Losses, T = Ties, Pts = Points, GF = Goals for, GA = Goals against
Note: Teams that qualified for the playoffs are highlighted in bold.

=== Record vs. opponents ===
Smythe Division record vs. opponents

**Vs. Campbell Conference**

**Vs. Wales Conference**

**Vs. Smythe Division**

1976–77 NHL records
Team	**CHI**	**COL**	**MIN**	**STL**	**VAN**	**Total**
Chicago	—	2–2–2	2–3–1	2–4	1–4–1	**7–13–4**
Colorado	2–2–2	—	3–2–1	1–4–1	2–2–2	**8–10–6**
Minnesota	3–2–1	2–3–1	—	2–2–2	1–4–1	**8–11–5**
St. Louis	4–2	4–1–1	2–2–2	—	4–1–1	**14–6–4**
Vancouver	4–1–1	2–2–2	4–1–1	1–4–1	—	**11–8–5**

**Vs. Patrick Division**

1976–77 NHL records
Team	**ATL**	**NYI**	**NYR**	**PHI**	**Total**
Chicago	2–3	1–3–1	2–2–1	0–3–2	**5–11–4**
Colorado	1–3–1	0–5	1–3–1	0–5	**2–16–2**
Minnesota	1–2–2	1–3–1	0–5	0–3–2	**2–13–5**
St. Louis	1–4	1–3–1	2–2–1	0–5	**4–14–2**
Vancouver	3–1–1	1–4	2–3	0–4–1	**6–12–2**

**Vs. Adams Division**

1976–77 NHL records
Team	**BOS**	**BUF**	**CLE**	**TOR**	**Total**
Chicago	0–4	1–3	1–3	2–1–1	**4–11–1**
Colorado	1–3	0–3–1	1–2–1	1–2–1	**3–10–3**
Minnesota	2–1–1	1–2–1	1–1–2	1–3	**5–7–4**
St. Louis	1–2–1	2–2	1–2–1	2–2	**6–8–2**
Vancouver	0–4	0–3–1	1–2–1	1–2–1	**2–11–3**

**Vs. Norris Division**

1976–77 NHL records
Team	**DET**	**LAK**	**MTL**	**PIT**	**WSH**	**Total**
Chicago	4–0	2–2	0–3–1	2–2	2–1–1	**10–8–2**
Colorado	4–0	0–2–2	0–3–1	2–2	1–3	**7–10–3**
Minnesota	3–0–1	3–1	0–3–1	1–3	1–1–2	**8–8–4**
St. Louis	3–0–1	2–2	1–3	1–3	1–3	**8–11–1**
Vancouver	1–3	2–0–2	0–4	1–2–1	2–2	**6–11–3**

== Schedule and results ==
1976–77 regular season
October

Game	Result	Date	Score	Opponent	Record
1	L	October 6, 1976	5–6	@ New York Rangers (1976–77)	0–1–0
2	L	October 7, 1976	2–6	@ Boston Bruins (1976–77)	0–2–0
3	W	October 9, 1976	4–1	Colorado Rockies (1976–77)	1–2–0
4	L	October 12, 1976	4–10	New York Rangers (1976–77)	1–3–0
5	L	October 16, 1976	1–2	Buffalo Sabres (1976–77)	1–4–0
6	L	October 17, 1976	0–3	@ Chicago Black Hawks (1976–77)	1–5–0
7	W	October 20, 1976	4–3	Atlanta Flames (1976–77)	2–5–0
8	T	October 22, 1976	3–3	@ Colorado Rockies (1976–77)	2–5–1
9	W	October 23, 1976	4–3	Chicago Black Hawks (1976–77)	3–5–1
10	W	October 27, 1976	5–3	@ Toronto Maple Leafs (1976–77)	4–5–1
11	L	October 30, 1976	1–5	Toronto Maple Leafs (1976–77)	4–6–1
12	L	October 31, 1976	1–9	@ Philadelphia Flyers (1976–77)	4–7–1

November

Game	Result	Date	Score	Opponent	Record
13	L	November 3, 1976	2–5	Montreal Canadiens (1976–77)	4–8–1
14	L	November 6, 1976	2–5	@ New York Islanders (1976–77)	4–9–1
15	L	November 7, 1976	1–4	@ Washington Capitals (1976–77)	4–10–1
16	W	November 10, 1976	3–2	Pittsburgh Penguins (1976–77)	5–10–1
17	L	November 13, 1976	2–3	New York Islanders (1976–77)	5–11–1
18	T	November 14, 1976	4–4	@ Buffalo Sabres (1976–77)	5–11–2
19	T	November 17, 1976	3–3	Cleveland Barons (1976–77)	5–11–3
20	L	November 19, 1976	3–6	@ Montreal Canadiens (1976–77)	5–12–3
21	L	November 20, 1976	3–8	@ Toronto Maple Leafs (1976–77)	5–13–3
22	L	November 24, 1976	2–4	St. Louis Blues (1976–77)	5–14–3
23	W	November 27, 1976	6–1	Washington Capitals (1976–77)	6–14–3
24	L	November 28, 1976	1–4	@ New York Rangers (1976–77)	6–15–3

December

Game	Result	Date	Score	Opponent	Record
25	T	December 1, 1976	2–2	Philadelphia Flyers (1976–77)	6–15–4
26	L	December 4, 1976	4–11	New York Rangers (1976–77)	6–16–4
27	L	December 7, 1976	2–6	@ Pittsburgh Penguins (1976–77)	6–17–4
28	L	December 8, 1976	0–5	Atlanta Flames (1976–77)	6–18–4
29	T	December 10, 1976	3–3	@ Atlanta Flames (1976–77)	6–18–5
30	T	December 11, 1976	1–1	@ St. Louis Blues (1976–77)	6–18–6
31	T	December 14, 1976	3–3	Philadelphia Flyers (1976–77)	6–18–7
32	L	December 18, 1976	1–3	Vancouver Canucks (1976–77)	6–19–7
33	T	December 21, 1976	3–3	Chicago Black Hawks (1976–77)	6–19–8
34	L	December 22, 1976	3–4	@ Cleveland Barons (1976–77)	6–20–8
35	W	December 28, 1976	8–3	Los Angeles Kings (1976–77)	7–20–8
36	T	December 30, 1976	5–5	@ Montreal Canadiens (1976–77)	7–20–9

January

Game	Result	Date	Score	Opponent	Record
37	L	January 1, 1977	1–3	@ St. Louis Blues (1976–77)	7–21–9
38	W	January 5, 1977	5–2	Los Angeles Kings (1976–77)	8–21–9
39	W	January 6, 1977	7–2	@ Detroit Red Wings (1976–77)	9–21–9
40	W	January 8, 1977	3–1	Boston Bruins (1976–77)	10–21–9
41	L	January 12, 1977	3–5	@ Vancouver Canucks (1976–77)	10–22–9
42	T	January 15, 1977	3–3	@ Boston Bruins (1976–77)	10–22–10
43	L	January 16, 1977	2–4	@ Philadelphia Flyers (1976–77)	10–23–10
44	L	January 18, 1977	2–7	@ New York Islanders (1976–77)	10–24–10
45	T	January 20, 1977	4–4	Atlanta Flames (1976–77)	10–24–11
46	W	January 22, 1977	4–3	Buffalo Sabres (1976–77)	11–24–11
47	L	January 23, 1977	2–5	Toronto Maple Leafs (1976–77)	11–25–11
48	W	January 26, 1977	3–2	@ Los Angeles Kings (1976–77)	12–25–11
49	L	January 29, 1977	3–4	@ Vancouver Canucks (1976–77)	12–26–11
50	L	January 30, 1977	2–4	@ Colorado Rockies (1976–77)	12–27–11

February

Game	Result	Date	Score	Opponent	Record
51	L	February 2, 1977	2–5	@ Pittsburgh Penguins (1976–77)	12–28–11
52	T	February 5, 1977	5–5	Vancouver Canucks (1976–77)	12–28–12
53	W	February 6, 1977	3–0	@ Chicago Black Hawks (1976–77)	13–28–12
54	L	February 9, 1977	6–8	Colorado Rockies (1976–77)	13–29–12
55	T	February 12, 1977	2–2	Detroit Red Wings (1976–77)	13–29–13
56	L	February 13, 1977	2–6	@ Buffalo Sabres (1976–77)	13–30–13
57	T	February 15, 1977	3–3	@ Washington Capitals (1976–77)	13–30–14
58	T	February 17, 1977	4–4	Washington Capitals (1976–77)	13–30–15
59	W	February 19, 1977	6–2	Chicago Black Hawks (1976–77)	14–30–15
60	L	February 20, 1977	2–3	@ Colorado Rockies (1976–77)	14–31–15
61	W	February 23, 1977	2–1	Boston Bruins (1976–77)	15–31–15
62	L	February 25, 1977	2–6	@ Atlanta Flames (1976–77)	15–32–15
63	W	February 26, 1977	3–0	Vancouver Canucks (1976–77)	16–32–15

March

Game	Result	Date	Score	Opponent	Record
64	L	March 1, 1977	2–5	Philadelphia Flyers (1976–77)	16–33–15
65	W	March 5, 1977	6–3	Colorado Rockies (1976–77)	17–33–15
66	W	March 6, 1977	3–2	St. Louis Blues (1976–77)	18–33–15
67	W	March 8, 1977	3–1	@ New York Islanders (1976–77)	19–33–15
68	L	March 9, 1977	4–6	@ New York Rangers (1976–77)	19–34–15
69	T	March 12, 1977	3–3	@ St. Louis Blues (1976–77)	19–34–16
70	T	March 13, 1977	5–5	New York Islanders (1976–77)	19–34–17
71	L	March 16, 1977	2–5	Montreal Canadiens (1976–77)	19–35–17
72	T	March 18, 1977	2–2	@ Cleveland Barons (1976–77)	19–35–18
73	W	March 20, 1977	2–1	Detroit Red Wings (1976–77)	20–35–18
74	L	March 22, 1977	2–4	Pittsburgh Penguins (1976–77)	20–36–18
75	L	March 26, 1977	2–7	@ Chicago Black Hawks (1976–77)	20–37–18
76	W	March 28, 1977	5–4	St. Louis Blues (1976–77)	21–37–18
77	W	March 29, 1977	4–2	Cleveland Barons (1976–77)	22–37–18
78	W	March 31, 1977	3–1	@ Detroit Red Wings (1976–77)	23–37–18

April

Game	Result	Date	Score	Opponent	Record
79	L	April 2, 1977	2–7	@ Los Angeles Kings (1976–77)	23–38–18
80	L	April 3, 1977	3–6	@ Vancouver Canucks (1976–77)	23–39–18

Legend: Win (2 points) Loss (0 points) Tie (1 point)

== Draft picks ==
Minnesota's draft picks at the 1976 NHL amateur draft held in Montreal.

Round	#	Player	Nationality	College/Junior/Club team (League)
1	3	Glen Sharpley	Canada	Hull Festivals (QMJHL)
2	31	Jim Roberts	Canada	Ottawa 67's (OMJHL)
3	39	Don Jackson	United States	University of Notre Dame (WCHA)
3	51	Ron Zanussi	Canada	London Knights (OMJHL)
4	57	Mike Fedorko	Canada	Hamilton Fincups (OMJHL)
5	75	Phil Verchota	United States	University of Minnesota (WCHA)
6	93	Dave Delich	United States	Colorado College (WCHA)
7	110	Jeff Barr	United States	Michigan State University (WCHA)

== See also ==
- 1976–77 NHL season
