= 1976–77 Colorado Rockies season =

NHL hockey team season (first season in Colorado)

1976–77 Colorado Rockies
- Division: 5th Smythe
- Conference: 9th Campbell
- 1976–77 record: 20–46–14
- Home record: 12–20–8
- Road record: 8–26–6
- Goals for: 226
- Goals against: 307

Team information
- General manager: Ray Miron
- Coach: Johnny Wilson
- Captain: Simon Nolet
- Alternate captains: None
- Arena: McNichols Sports Arena

Team leaders
- Goals: Wilf Paiement (40)
- Assists: Wilf Paiement (41)
- Points: Wilf Paiement (81)
- Penalty minutes: Steve Durbano (129)
- Plus/minus: Tom Edur (+14)
- Wins: Michel Plasse (12)
- Goals against average: Bill McKenzie (2.40)

The 1976–77 Colorado Rockies season was the Rockies' first season. The Kansas City Scouts relocated in the off-season to Denver. With the World Hockey Association's Denver Spurs leaving Denver in a midnight move to Ottawa, Ontario just about 10 months earlier, Denver would get a franchise and the team would be anointed the Colorado Rockies. The team moved from Kansas City, which was a two-year NHL franchise that struggled from the beginning.

The team took to the ice for their first regular season against the Toronto Maple Leafs on October 6, 1976. Rockies goalie Doug Favell played extremely well, as he stopped 39 of the Maple Leafs' 41 shots on net to go with his 95.1 save percentage. Wilf Paiement notched a goal, a pair of assists, and a fight. Rockies rookie Larry Skinner scored the first NHL regular season goal for the franchise. The final score was 4–2, with the Rockies winning.

The team was competitive in the weak Smythe Division for a major portion of the season. Early in the season, the Rockies picked up wins by either the goon tactics of Steve Durbano, or through the heroic feats of their goalies, Doug Favell and Michel Plasse. Bill McKenzie was also a goalie for the Rockies but played in only five games.

== Offseason ==
=== NHL draft ===
The draft was held while the franchise was in Kansas City.

Round	#	Player	Nationality	College/junior/club team
1	11	Paul Gardner (C)	Canada	Oshawa Generals (OHA)
3	38	Mike Kitchen (D)	Canada	Toronto Marlboros (OMJHL)
5	74	Rick McIntyre (LW)	Canada	Oshawa Generals (OMJHL)
6	92	Larry Skinner (C)	Canada	Ottawa 67's (OMJHL)

== Regular season ==
On some nights, the Rockies could come back from two and three goal deficits to get ties or the occasional win, but then the next night the team would be overmatched by one of the elite teams in the league.

=== Steve Durbano ===
Goonery was a big part of hockey in 1976 and the Rockies' goon at the beginning of the season was Steve Durbano. After losing three in a row, Durbano tried to get the Rockies going with goon tactics. Despite his goon tactics, Durbano did not last long with the franchise, playing only 18 games; his penalty minute total in that handful of games, however, was sufficient to lead the team for the season.

=== Goaltending ===
Teams were launching over 40 and 50 shots on net against Plasse and Favell. After a November game against the defending Stanley Cup champion Montreal Canadiens, Plasse was noticeably hurt. The Canadiens were blasting the puck towards Plasse all game. One shot off the stick of Canadiens player Murray Wilson put Plasse down in the second period with an arm injury, but the goalie was able to get up and finish the game. The Rockies' forwards were able to come back twice from two-goal deficits to finally tie the game at three a piece with just about nine minutes left in the third. However it was Plasse preserved the tie stand by stopping 47 of 50 shots, 20 in the third period.

=== Ray Miron ===
A November 2–1 loss to the Cleveland Barons raised the ire of General Manager Ray Miron. During the second intermission, Miron burst into the locker room and said that if the Rockies didn't pull the game out, he was going to call up three minor leaguers and send down three Rockies. Miron kept his word after the 2–1 Rockies loss and called up Mike Kitchen, Paul Gardner and Jim McElmury. Gardner made a quick impact, tallying five goals in his first four NHL games. Kitchen helped shore up the defense. Despite a 5–3 loss to the Bruins, Bruin coach Don Cherry raved that he was "impressed" with the Rockies.

=== Playoff contention ===
The Rockies would be successful in upending divisional rivals the Minnesota North Stars. It took three goals in the third period, including two in the final two minutes, to win the game 4–2. After the game, coach Johnny Wilson was raving for his team. The Rockies had taken over sole possession of third place in the Smythe Division with the win. By February 1, the Rockies had a two-point third-place lead over Minnesota and Vancouver. The Rockies would face the New York Rangers on February 1, and the goaltender Plasse would stop 48 of 50 Ranger shots. His performance would help the Rockies to a 5–2 win. The win extended their third place lead to four points. A February 6 game against the Pittsburgh Penguins saw the Rockies score four unanswered third period goals to win the game 5–2. The Rockies had a former member of the WHA's Denver Spurs on the club. Ron Delorme, the former Spur, would score the game winner in his first stint with the team. He had been playing with Baltimore in the Southern Hockey League. The Rockies continued to be successful. The club enjoyed an 8–6 win against Minnesota, as it extended their third place margin to five points ahead of them. The Rockies were only five points behind second-place Chicago. On February 16, the Rockies won their fourth game of the season against the Detroit Red Wings. A February 20 triumph against the North Stars would be the last highlight of the season for the club. By March 27, the Rockies were officially out of the playoff hunt. This was attributed to an 18-game winless streak that began on February 22. The goaltending of Doug Favell and Plasse kept the team in contention during many games. A typical night saw the goaltenders facing 50 shots. When the Rockies were based in Kansas City, the Scouts had finished their tenure in Kansas City by only winning one game in their final 44. The winless streak finally stopped in a 6–3 win against the Vancouver Canucks. This was the second-to-the-last game of the season. The Rockies season ended with a loss to the LA Kings.

=== Final standings ===
Smythe Division
	GP	W	L	T	GF	GA	Pts
**St. Louis Blues**	80	32	39	9	239	276	73
**Minnesota North Stars**	80	23	39	18	240	310	64
**Chicago Black Hawks**	80	26	43	11	240	298	63
Vancouver Canucks	80	25	42	13	235	294	63
Colorado Rockies	80	20	46	14	226	307	54

Note: GP = Games played, W = Wins, L = Losses, T = Ties, Pts = Points, GF = Goals for, GA = Goals against
Note: Teams that qualified for the playoffs are highlighted in bold.

=== Record vs. opponents ===
Smythe Division record vs. opponents

**Vs. Campbell Conference**

**Vs. Wales Conference**

**Vs. Smythe Division**

1976–77 NHL records
Team	**CHI**	**COL**	**MIN**	**STL**	**VAN**	**Total**
Chicago	—	2–2–2	2–3–1	2–4	1–4–1	**7–13–4**
Colorado	2–2–2	—	3–2–1	1–4–1	2–2–2	**8–10–6**
Minnesota	3–2–1	2–3–1	—	2–2–2	1–4–1	**8–11–5**
St. Louis	4–2	4–1–1	2–2–2	—	4–1–1	**14–6–4**
Vancouver	4–1–1	2–2–2	4–1–1	1–4–1	—	**11–8–5**

**Vs. Patrick Division**

1976–77 NHL records
Team	**ATL**	**NYI**	**NYR**	**PHI**	**Total**
Chicago	2–3	1–3–1	2–2–1	0–3–2	**5–11–4**
Colorado	1–3–1	0–5	1–3–1	0–5	**2–16–2**
Minnesota	1–2–2	1–3–1	0–5	0–3–2	**2–13–5**
St. Louis	1–4	1–3–1	2–2–1	0–5	**4–14–2**
Vancouver	3–1–1	1–4	2–3	0–4–1	**6–12–2**

**Vs. Adams Division**

1976–77 NHL records
Team	**BOS**	**BUF**	**CLE**	**TOR**	**Total**
Chicago	0–4	1–3	1–3	2–1–1	**4–11–1**
Colorado	1–3	0–3–1	1–2–1	1–2–1	**3–10–3**
Minnesota	2–1–1	1–2–1	1–1–2	1–3	**5–7–4**
St. Louis	1–2–1	2–2	1–2–1	2–2	**6–8–2**
Vancouver	0–4	0–3–1	1–2–1	1–2–1	**2–11–3**

**Vs. Norris Division**

1976–77 NHL records
Team	**DET**	**LAK**	**MTL**	**PIT**	**WSH**	**Total**
Chicago	4–0	2–2	0–3–1	2–2	2–1–1	**10–8–2**
Colorado	4–0	0–2–2	0–3–1	2–2	1–3	**7–10–3**
Minnesota	3–0–1	3–1	0–3–1	1–3	1–1–2	**8–8–4**
St. Louis	3–0–1	2–2	1–3	1–3	1–3	**8–11–1**
Vancouver	1–3	2–0–2	0–4	1–2–1	2–2	**6–11–3**

== Schedule and results ==
1976–77 regular season
October

Game	Result	Date	Score	Opponent	Record
1	W	October 5	4–2	Toronto Maple Leafs (1976–77)	1–0–0
2	L	October 8	3–5	New York Rangers (1976–77)	1–1–0
3	L	October 9	1–4	@ Minnesota North Stars (1976–77)	1–2–0
4	L	October 13	2–3	St. Louis Blues (1976–77)	1–3–0
5	W	October 15	5–3	Chicago Black Hawks (1976–77)	2–3–0
6	L	October 17	3–4	@ New York Rangers (1976–77)	2–4–0
7	L	October 20	1–2	Boston Bruins (1976–77)	2–5–0
8	T	October 22	3–3	Minnesota North Stars (1976–77)	2–5–1
9	L	October 24	3–5	@ Philadelphia Flyers (1976–77)	2–6–1
10	W	October 27	4–2	Atlanta Flames (1976–77)	3–6–1
11	L	October 29	1–2	Washington Capitals (1976–77)	3–7–1
12	L	October 30	1–3	@ St. Louis Blues (1976–77)	3–8–1

November

Game	Result	Date	Score	Opponent	Record
13	L	November 2	1–5	New York Islanders (1976–77)	3–9–1
14	L	November 5	1–4	Pittsburgh Penguins (1976–77)	3–10–1
15	W	November 7	3–2	@ Chicago Black Hawks (1976–77)	4–10–1
16	L	November 10	1–2	Cleveland Barons (1976–77)	4–11–1
17	T	November 13	3–3	@ Montreal Canadiens (1976–77)	4–11–2
18	L	November 14	3–5	@ Boston Bruins (1976–77)	4–12–2
19	L	November 17	3–6	@ Atlanta Flames (1976–77)	4–13–2
20	W	November 20	5–2	@ Pittsburgh Penguins (1976–77)	5–13–2
21	L	November 21	1–3	@ Washington Capitals (1976–77)	5–14–2
22	L	November 26	2–4	Philadelphia Flyers (1976–77)	5–15–2
23	T	November 28	6–6	Los Angeles Kings (1976–77)	5–15–3
24	W	November 30	5–3	@ St. Louis Blues (1976–77)	6–15–3

December

Game	Result	Date	Score	Opponent	Record
25	W	December 1	5–3	Cleveland Barons (1976–77)	7–15–3
26	W	December 3	3–2	Vancouver Canucks (1976–77)	8–15–3
27	L	December 5	3–5	@ Buffalo Sabres (1976–77)	8–16–3
28	T	December 8	3–3	@ Los Angeles Kings (1976–77)	8–16–4
29	T	December 11	4–4	@ Vancouver Canucks (1976–77)	8–16–5
30	L	December 15	2–8	Montreal Canadiens (1976–77)	8–17–5
31	L	December 18	2–4	@ Toronto Maple Leafs (1976–77)	8–18–5
32	L	December 19	3–4	@ Philadelphia Flyers (1976–77)	8–19–5
33	L	December 22	1–2	St. Louis Blues (1976–77)	8–20–5
34	L	December 26	3–5	@ Chicago Black Hawks (1976–77)	8–21–5
35	L	December 27	2–6	@ Atlanta Flames (1976–77)	8–22–5
36	W	December 29	3–1	Washington Capitals (1976–77)	9–22–5
37	T	December 31	2–2	Chicago Black Hawks (1976–77)	9–22–6

January

Game	Result	Date	Score	Opponent	Record
38	W	January 2	6–4	@ Detroit Red Wings (1976–77)	10–22–6
39	L	January 5	4–6	@ Toronto Maple Leafs (1976–77)	10–23–6
40	T	January 7	4–4	New York Rangers (1976–77)	10–23–7
41	L	January 11	0–6	Montreal Canadiens (1976–77)	10–24–7
42	W	January 13	4–2	Detroit Red Wings (1976–77)	11–24–7
43	L	January 15	2–5	@ Philadelphia Flyers (1976–77)	11–25–7
44	L	January 16	0–3	@ Buffalo Sabres (1976–77)	11–26–7
45	T	January 18	7–7	Chicago Black Hawks (1976–77)	11–26–8
46	W	January 20	3–1	@ Detroit Red Wings (1976–77)	12–26–8
47	L	January 22	1–2	@ St. Louis Blues (1976–77)	12–27–8
48	L	January 23	1–7	New York Islanders (1976–77)	12–28–8
49	W	January 27	6–4	@ Boston Bruins (1976–77)	13–28–8
50	T	January 28	3–3	@ Atlanta Flames (1976–77)	13–28–9
51	W	January 30	4–2	Minnesota North Stars (1976–77)	14–28–9

February

Game	Result	Date	Score	Opponent	Record
52	W	February 1	5–2	New York Rangers (1976–77)	15–28–9
53	L	February 3	4–6	Buffalo Sabres (1976–77)	15–29–9
54	W	February 6	5–2	Pittsburgh Penguins (1976–77)	16–29–9
55	W	February 9	8–6	@ Minnesota North Stars (1976–77)	17–29–9
56	L	February 11	0–3	@ Cleveland Barons (1976–77)	17–30–9
57	L	February 12	2–4	@ Chicago Black Hawks (1976–77)	17–31–9
58	W	February 15	6–2	Detroit Red Wings (1976–77)	18–31–9
59	T	February 18	3–3	@ Cleveland Barons (1976–77)	18–31–10
60	W	February 20	3–2	Minnesota North Stars (1976–77)	19–31–10
61	L	February 22	1–2	@ New York Islanders (1976–77)	19–32–10
62	L	February 25	2–5	Boston Bruins (1976–77)	19–33–10
63	L	February 27	3–4	Philadelphia Flyers (1976–77)	19–34–10

March

Game	Result	Date	Score	Opponent	Record
64	T	March 2	2–2	St. Louis Blues (1976–77)	19–34–11
65	L	March 5	3–6	@ Minnesota North Stars (1976–77)	19–35–11
66	L	March 6	0–5	New York Islanders (1976–77)	19–36–11
67	L	March 9	0–3	@ Pittsburgh Penguins (1976–77)	19–37–11
68	L	March 10	1–7	@ Montreal Canadiens (1976–77)	19–38–11
69	T	March 12	2–2	@ Vancouver Canucks (1976–77)	19–38–12
70	L	March 13	2–6	Vancouver Canucks (1976–77)	19–39–12
71	T	March 16	4–4	Toronto Maple Leafs (1976–77)	19–39–13
72	L	March 18	0–5	@ Washington Capitals (1976–77)	19–40–13
73	L	March 20	1–4	Vancouver Canucks (1976–77)	19–41–13
74	L	March 22	2–9	@ New York Islanders (1976–77)	19–42–13
75	L	March 23	3–5	@ New York Rangers (1976–77)	19–43–13
76	T	March 25	2–2	Buffalo Sabres (1976–77)	19–43–14
77	L	March 26	1–2	Atlanta Flames (1976–77)	19–44–14
78	L	March 31	5–7	@ Los Angeles Kings (1976–77)	19–45–14

April

Game	Result	Date	Score	Opponent	Record
79	W	April 1	6–3	@ Vancouver Canucks (1976–77)	20–45–14
80	L	April 3	4–6	Los Angeles Kings (1976–77)	20–46–14

Legend: Win (2 points) Loss (0 points) Tie (1 point)

== Player statistics ==
=== Regular season ===
Scoring

Player	Pos	GP	G	A	Pts	PIM	+/-	PPG	SHG	GWG
Wilf Paiement	RW	78	41	40	81	101	−13	9	5	2
Paul Gardner	C	60	30	29	59	25	−28	11	0	0
Gary Croteau	LW	78	24	27	51	14	−18	5	0	2
Nelson Pyatt	C	77	23	22	45	20	−17	2	0	4
Barry Dean	LW	79	14	25	39	92	−26	2	0	0
Dave Hudson	C	73	15	21	36	14	−3	1	0	2
Tom Edur	D	80	7	25	32	39	14	3	0	1
Simon Nolet	RW	52	12	19	31	10	0	1	1	2
Jim McElmury	D	55	7	23	30	16	−15	1	0	1
Chuck Arnason	RW	61	13	10	23	10	−23	3	0	1
Ron Andruff	C	66	4	18	22	21	−18	0	0	0
Danny Gruen	LW	29	8	10	18	12	−6	2	0	1
Denis Dupere	LW	57	7	11	18	4	3	1	3	2
John Van Boxmeer	D	41	2	11	13	32	−20	0	0	0
Colin Campbell	D	54	3	8	11	67	−22	0	0	0
Tracy Pratt	D	66	1	10	11	110	−27	0	0	0
Ron Delorme	C	29	6	4	10	23	−11	0	0	2
Larry Skinner	C	19	4	5	9	6	−13	3	0	0
Guy Delparte	LW	48	1	8	9	18	−10	0	0	0
Mike Kitchen	D	60	1	8	9	36	−2	0	0	0
Phil Roberto	RW	22	1	5	6	23	−11	0	0	0
Bryan Lefley	D/LW	58	0	6	6	27	−15	0	0	0
Sean Shanahan	C/RW	30	1	3	4	40	−11	0	0	0
Larry Johnston	D	25	0	3	3	35	−25	0	0	0
Roger Lemelin	D	14	1	1	2	21	−6	0	0	0
Henry Boucha	C	9	0	2	2	4	0	0	0	0
Steve Durbano	D	19	0	2	2	129	−6	0	0	0
Don Cairns	LW	2	0	1	1	2	1	0	0	0
Michel Plasse	G	54	0	1	1	0	0	0	0	0
Doug Favell	G	30	0	0	0	15	0	0	0	0
Bill McKenzie	G	5	0	0	0	0	0	0	0	0
Randy Rota	C/LW	1	0	0	0	0	0	0	0	0

Goaltending

Player	MIN	GP	W	L	T	GA	GAA	SO
Michel Plasse	2986	54	12	29	10	190	3.82	0
Doug Favell	1614	30	8	15	3	105	3.90	0
Bill McKenzie	200	5	0	2	1	8	2.40	0
Team:	4800	80	20	46	14	303	3.79	0

Note: GP = Games played; G = Goals; A = Assists; Pts = Points; +/- = Plus/minus; PIM = Penalty minutes; PPG=Power-play goals; SHG=Short-handed goals; GWG=Game-winning goals
MIN=Minutes played; W = Wins; L = Losses; T = Ties; GA = Goals against; GAA = Goals against average; SO = Shutouts;

== Farm teams ==
In 1976–77, the Rockies had affiliations with three different teams, including: the Flint Generals, the Greensboro Generals, and the Rhode Island Reds.
