= 1976–77 Vancouver Canucks season =

7th season in franchise history

1976–77 Vancouver Canucks
- Division: 4th Norris
- Conference: 8th Campbell
- 1976–77 record: 25–42–13
- Home record: 13–21–6
- Road record: 12–21–7
- Goals for: 235
- Goals against: 294

Team information
- General manager: Phil Maloney
- Coach: Phil Maloney (9–23–3); Orland Kurtenbach (16–19–10)
- Captain: Chris Oddleifson
- Alternate captains: Don Lever; Dennis Kearns
- Arena: Pacific Coliseum
- Average attendance: 15,547

Team leaders
- Goals: Rick Blight (28)
- Assists: Dennis Kearns (55)
- Points: Rick Blight (68)
- Penalty minutes: Harold Snepsts (149)
- Wins: Cesare Maniago (17)
- Goals against average: Cesare Maniago (3.36)

The 1976–77 Vancouver Canucks season was the team's seventh in the NHL. The Canucks failed to reach the playoffs. Phil Maloney, the team's general manager and head coach, was replaced mid-season as head coach by Orland Kurtenbach, the first captain of the Canucks.

== Off-season ==
The Canucks made a complete change in the goal department for the 1976–77 season. On August 23, disgruntled Gary Smith was traded to Minnesota for veteran Cesare Maniago. Born and raised in Trail, Maniago became the first home-grown British Columbian to be a Canucks regular. In September, Ken Lockett signed as a free-agent with San Diego of the World Hockey Association. The back-up job was inherited by Curt Ridley. Both goalies would see plenty of rubber. The retirement of Andre Boudrias meant that the captaincy was available and Chris Oddleifson filled the vacancy.

== Regular season ==
Sophomore right-winger Rick Blight scored four goals in a 9–5 loss in Pittsburgh on opening night and continued to lead the team in scoring throughout the season, finishing with 68 points. The loss was a sign of things to come, as the Canucks won only five of their first 24 games. After a 5–4 home loss to Montreal on December 20, Phil Maloney decided that he needed more time to concentrate on his General Manager duties and called up ex-Canuck captain Orland Kurtenbach from Tulsa of the Central League to coach the remainder of the season. He started off with a 3–2 win in Los Angeles before winning only one of his next eight.

In the middle of that streak was a game that did not count but garnered considerable attention. The Canucks hosted the Soviet club Spartak Moscow on December 28 at the Pacific Coliseum. Rick Blight scored twice and Curt Ridley picked up a shutout as the Canucks won 2–0 before a jubilant full house. On January 25 there was another special event at the Coliseum—the NHL All-Star Game. Harold Snepsts represented the Canucks in the mid-season classic, which was won 4–3 by the Wales Conference.

But the team stumbled along until March, perhaps partly due to the infrequent play of rugged defenseman Mike Robitaille, who was having back problems. Then in a February 11 game against Pittsburgh, which the Canucks won 3–2, Robitaille came out of the penalty box and was blind-sided by Penguins tough-guy Dennis Owchar. Robitaille suffered a spinal injury and never played again. He later sued the Canucks for forcing him to play hurt, misdiagnosing his injuries, and making slanderous comments about him (calling him a "head case" and a hypochondriac) and was awarded $540,000 by the Supreme Court of B.C. in 1978.

With 17 games to play, there seemed to be no hope of salvaging the season, as the Canucks trailed Chicago for the third and final Smythe Division playoff spot by 15 points. But Vancouver went 8–3–6, which included a 10-game unbeaten streak (5–0–5). Chicago, meanwhile, took a nose dive and went 3–13–1 to finish up. The Canucks won both key meetings with the Black Hawks during that stretch. Unfortunately, they had to come from too far behind and a 6–3 home loss to Colorado in game number 79 eliminated them from playoff contention. They then won 6–3 over Minnesota in the finale to finish with 63 points, causing them to miss the final playoff spot to the Hawks on a tiebreaker (26–25 in wins).

Besides Blight's fine season, Dennis Kearns upped his franchise record for defensemen to 55 assists and set a new record with 60 points. But Kearns was also often the victim of the Coliseum boo-birds for his apparent lack of physical play and a tendency to make bad gambles. In any event, it was apparent that the modest success of the previous couple of seasons had gone for naught and that it was once again back to the drawing board.

=== Final standings ===
Smythe Division
	GP	W	L	T	GF	GA	Pts
**St. Louis Blues**	80	32	39	9	239	276	73
**Minnesota North Stars**	80	23	39	18	240	310	64
**Chicago Black Hawks**	80	26	43	11	240	298	63
Vancouver Canucks	80	25	42	13	235	294	63
Colorado Rockies	80	20	46	14	226	307	54

Note: GP = Games played, W = Wins, L = Losses, T = Ties, Pts = Points, GF = Goals for, GA = Goals against
Note: Teams that qualified for the playoffs are highlighted in bold.

=== Record vs. opponents ===
Smythe Division record vs. opponents

**Vs. Campbell Conference**

**Vs. Wales Conference**

**Vs. Smythe Division**

1976–77 NHL records
Team	**CHI**	**COL**	**MIN**	**STL**	**VAN**	**Total**
Chicago	—	2–2–2	2–3–1	2–4	1–4–1	**7–13–4**
Colorado	2–2–2	—	3–2–1	1–4–1	2–2–2	**8–10–6**
Minnesota	3–2–1	2–3–1	—	2–2–2	1–4–1	**8–11–5**
St. Louis	4–2	4–1–1	2–2–2	—	4–1–1	**14–6–4**
Vancouver	4–1–1	2–2–2	4–1–1	1–4–1	—	**11–8–5**

**Vs. Patrick Division**

1976–77 NHL records
Team	**ATL**	**NYI**	**NYR**	**PHI**	**Total**
Chicago	2–3	1–3–1	2–2–1	0–3–2	**5–11–4**
Colorado	1–3–1	0–5	1–3–1	0–5	**2–16–2**
Minnesota	1–2–2	1–3–1	0–5	0–3–2	**2–13–5**
St. Louis	1–4	1–3–1	2–2–1	0–5	**4–14–2**
Vancouver	3–1–1	1–4	2–3	0–4–1	**6–12–2**

**Vs. Adams Division**

1976–77 NHL records
Team	**BOS**	**BUF**	**CLE**	**TOR**	**Total**
Chicago	0–4	1–3	1–3	2–1–1	**4–11–1**
Colorado	1–3	0–3–1	1–2–1	1–2–1	**3–10–3**
Minnesota	2–1–1	1–2–1	1–1–2	1–3	**5–7–4**
St. Louis	1–2–1	2–2	1–2–1	2–2	**6–8–2**
Vancouver	0–4	0–3–1	1–2–1	1–2–1	**2–11–3**

**Vs. Norris Division**

1976–77 NHL records
Team	**DET**	**LAK**	**MTL**	**PIT**	**WSH**	**Total**
Chicago	4–0	2–2	0–3–1	2–2	2–1–1	**10–8–2**
Colorado	4–0	0–2–2	0–3–1	2–2	1–3	**7–10–3**
Minnesota	3–0–1	3–1	0–3–1	1–3	1–1–2	**8–8–4**
St. Louis	3–0–1	2–2	1–3	1–3	1–3	**8–11–1**
Vancouver	1–3	2–0–2	0–4	1–2–1	2–2	**6–11–3**

== Schedule and results ==
1976–77 regular season
October

Game	Result	Date	Score	Opponent	Record
1	L	October 6, 1976	5–9	@ Pittsburgh Penguins (1976–77)	0–1–0
2	L	October 9, 1976	0–3	@ Montreal Canadiens (1976–77)	0–2–0
3	L	October 10, 1976	1–5	@ Chicago Black Hawks (1976–77)	0–3–0
4	W	October 13, 1976	4–1	Washington Capitals (1976–77)	1–3–0
5	L	October 16, 1976	3–6	St. Louis Blues (1976–77)	1–4–0
6	L	October 19, 1976	1–6	@ New York Islanders (1976–77)	1–5–0
7	L	October 20, 1976	0–4	@ Buffalo Sabres (1976–77)	1–6–0
8	W	October 22, 1976	5–3	@ Atlanta Flames (1976–77)	2–6–0
9	W	October 24, 1976	5–4	@ New York Rangers (1976–77)	3–6–0
10	L	October 26, 1976	2–5	@ St. Louis Blues (1976–77)	3–7–0
11	W	October 28, 1976	3–1	Cleveland Barons (1976–77)	4–7–0
12	T	October 30, 1976	3–3	Atlanta Flames (1976–77)	4–7–1

November

Game	Result	Date	Score	Opponent	Record
13	L	November 1, 1976	2–3	New York Islanders (1976–77)	4–8–1
14	L	November 3, 1976	1–6	New York Rangers (1976–77)	4–9–1
15	W	November 5, 1976	4–1	Los Angeles Kings (1976–77)	5–9–1
16	L	November 7, 1976	1–3	@ Boston Bruins (1976–77)	5–10–1
17	L	November 9, 1976	2–4	@ Washington Capitals (1976–77)	5–11–1
18	L	November 11, 1976	4–6	@ Philadelphia Flyers (1976–77)	5–12–1
19	L	November 13, 1976	0–3	Toronto Maple Leafs (1976–77)	5–13–1
20	L	November 17, 1976	2–3	Buffalo Sabres (1976–77)	5–14–1
21	L	November 19, 1976	4–6	New York Islanders (1976–77)	5–15–1
22	L	November 22, 1976	2–3	New York Rangers (1976–77)	5–16–1
23	T	November 24, 1976	4–4	@ Buffalo Sabres (1976–77)	5–16–2
24	L	November 25, 1976	2–4	@ Boston Bruins (1976–77)	5–17–2
25	W	November 27, 1976	4–3	Chicago Black Hawks (1976–77)	6–17–2

December

Game	Result	Date	Score	Opponent	Record
26	L	December 1, 1976	2–5	Detroit Red Wings (1976–77)	6–18–2
27	L	December 3, 1976	2–3	@ Colorado Rockies (1976–77)	6–19–2
28	W	December 5, 1976	4–2	@ Chicago Black Hawks (1976–77)	7–19–2
29	L	December 7, 1976	3–4	@ Washington Capitals (1976–77)	7–20–2
30	W	December 8, 1976	4–3	@ Toronto Maple Leafs (1976–77)	8–20–2
31	T	December 11, 1976	4–4	Colorado Rockies (1976–77)	8–20–3
32	L	December 14, 1976	3–6	Buffalo Sabres (1976–77)	8–21–3
33	L	December 16, 1976	3–7	@ Detroit Red Wings (1976–77)	8–22–3
34	W	December 18, 1976	3–1	@ Minnesota North Stars (1976–77)	9–22–3
35	L	December 20, 1976	4–5	Montreal Canadiens (1976–77)	9–23–3
36	W	December 22, 1976	3–2	@ Los Angeles Kings (1976–77)	10–23–3
37	L	December 23, 1976	2–4	St. Louis Blues (1976–77)	10–24–3
38	L	December 27, 1976	1–5	Philadelphia Flyers (1976–77)	10–25–3
39	L	December 29, 1976	1–8	Boston Bruins (1976–77)	10–26–3

January

Game	Result	Date	Score	Opponent	Record
40	W	January 1, 1977	5–1	@ New York Islanders (1976–77)	11–26–3
41	L	January 2, 1977	3–5	@ New York Rangers (1976–77)	11–27–3
42	T	January 4, 1977	2–2	@ Pittsburgh Penguins (1976–77)	11–27–4
43	L	January 5, 1977	1–4	@ Atlanta Flames (1976–77)	11–28–4
44	L	January 7, 1977	4–8	@ Cleveland Barons (1976–77)	11–29–4
45	W	January 8, 1977	5–2	@ St. Louis Blues (1976–77)	12–29–4
46	W	January 12, 1977	5–3	Minnesota North Stars (1976–77)	13–29–4
47	L	January 15, 1977	2–4	Cleveland Barons (1976–77)	13–30–4
48	L	January 19, 1977	0–3	Pittsburgh Penguins (1976–77)	13–31–4
49	L	January 21, 1977	1–3	Toronto Maple Leafs (1976–77)	13–32–4
50	W	January 23, 1977	6–2	New York Rangers (1976–77)	14–32–4
51	T	January 27, 1977	1–1	Chicago Black Hawks (1976–77)	14–32–5
52	W	January 29, 1977	4–3	Minnesota North Stars (1976–77)	15–32–5

February

Game	Result	Date	Score	Opponent	Record
53	L	February 3, 1977	4–6	Montreal Canadiens (1976–77)	15–33–5
54	T	February 5, 1977	5–5	@ Minnesota North Stars (1976–77)	15–33–6
55	L	February 6, 1977	2–3	@ Detroit Red Wings (1976–77)	15–34–6
56	L	February 9, 1977	0–6	@ Montreal Canadiens (1976–77)	15–35–6
57	W	February 11, 1977	3–2	Pittsburgh Penguins (1976–77)	16–35–6
58	L	February 14, 1977	1–2	New York Islanders (1976–77)	16–36–6
59	L	February 16, 1977	3–7	Boston Bruins (1976–77)	16–37–6
60	W	February 19, 1977	5–1	Atlanta Flames (1976–77)	17–37–6
61	L	February 21, 1977	0–4	St. Louis Blues (1976–77)	17–38–6
62	T	February 24, 1977	2–2	@ Los Angeles Kings (1976–77)	17–38–7
63	L	February 26, 1977	0–3	@ Minnesota North Stars (1976–77)	17–39–7
64	W	February 27, 1977	4–3	@ Chicago Black Hawks (1976–77)	18–39–7

March

Game	Result	Date	Score	Opponent	Record
65	W	March 2, 1977	2–1	@ Atlanta Flames (1976–77)	19–39–7
66	L	March 3, 1977	2–5	@ Philadelphia Flyers (1976–77)	19–40–7
67	T	March 5, 1977	4–4	@ Toronto Maple Leafs (1976–77)	19–40–8
68	W	March 9, 1977	5–2	Washington Capitals (1976–77)	20–40–8
69	W	March 10, 1977	5–0	Chicago Black Hawks (1976–77)	21–40–8
70	T	March 12, 1977	2–2	Colorado Rockies (1976–77)	21–40–9
71	W	March 13, 1977	6–2	@ Colorado Rockies (1976–77)	22–40–9
72	W	March 15, 1977	7–1	Detroit Red Wings (1976–77)	23–40–9
73	T	March 19, 1977	4–4	@ St. Louis Blues (1976–77)	23–40–10
74	W	March 20, 1977	4–1	@ Colorado Rockies (1976–77)	24–40–10
75	T	March 22, 1977	4–4	Philadelphia Flyers (1976–77)	24–40–11
76	T	March 25, 1977	4–4	@ Cleveland Barons (1976–77)	24–40–12
77	L	March 26, 1977	3–9	@ Philadelphia Flyers (1976–77)	24–41–12
78	T	March 29, 1977	3–3	Los Angeles Kings (1976–77)	24–41–13

April

Game	Result	Date	Score	Opponent	Record
79	L	April 1, 1977	3–6	Colorado Rockies (1976–77)	24–42–13
80	W	April 3, 1977	6–3	Minnesota North Stars (1976–77)	25–42–13

Legend: Win (2 points) Loss (0 points) Tie (1 point)

== Draft picks ==
Vancouver's picks at the 1976 NHL entry draft. The draft was at the NHL office in Montreal, Canada.

Round	#	Player	Nationality	College/Junior/Club team (League)
2	26	Bob Manno (D)	Canada	St. Catharines Black Hawks (OHA)
3	44	Rob Flockhart (LW)	Canada	Kamloops Chiefs (WCHL)
4	62	Elmer Ray (LW)	Canada	Calgary Centennials (WCHL)
5	80	Rick Durston (LW)	Canada	Victoria Cougars (WCHL)
6	98	Rob Tudor (C)	Canada	Regina Pats (WCHL)
7	114	Brad Rhiness (C)	Canada	Kingston Canadians (OHA)
8	122	Stuart Ostlund (C)	Canada	Michigan Tech Huskies (NCAA)

== See also ==
- 1976–77 NHL season
