= Gary Simmons (ice hockey) =

Canadian ice hockey player

- Born: July 19, 1944 (age 80); Charlottetown, Prince Edward Island, Canada
- Height: 6 ft 2 in (188 cm)
- Weight: 200 lb (91 kg; 14 st 4 lb)
- Position: Goaltender
- Caught: Left
- Played for: California Golden Seals; Cleveland Barons; Los Angeles Kings
- NHL draft: Undrafted
- Playing career: 1965–1979

Gary Simmons (born July 19, 1944) is a Canadian former ice hockey goaltender. He played four seasons in the National Hockey League (NHL) with the California Seals, Cleveland Barons, and Los Angeles Kings between 1974 and 1978.

Simmons was a large, rangy goaltender who had a penchant of roaming far from his goal crease to play the puck or cut off shooting angles. This would often result in either spectacular saves or embarrassing goals allowed into an open net. Simmons' nickname was "the Cobra," and he was known for his distinct black goalie mask that featured a design of a large cobra in raised strike position bearing its fangs. He recorded a shutout in his first NHL game.

== Career statistics ==
=== Regular season and playoffs ===
			Regular season									Playoffs
Season	Team	League	GP	W	L	T	MIN	GA	SO	GAA	SV%	GP	W	L	MIN	GA	SO	GAA	SV%
1963–64	Edmonton Oil Kings	CAHL	—	—	—	—	—	—	—	—	—	—	—	—	—	—	—	—	—
1964–65	Edmonton Oil Kings	CAHL	—	—	—	—	—	—	—	—	—	—	—	—	—	—	—	—	—
1964–65	Edmonton Oil Kings	M-Cup	—	—	—	—	—	—	—	—	—	13	9	4	790	43	0	3.27	—
1965–66	Toledo Blades	IHL	1	0	1	0	60	9	0	9.00	—	—	—	—	—	—	—	—	—
1965–66	Des Moines Oak Leafs	IHL	20	—	—	—	1200	93	0	4.65	—	—	—	—	—	—	—	—	—
1966–67	Conception Bay CeeBees	Nfld-Sr	37	23	14	0	2265	147	0	3.97	—	13	9	4	780	52	0	4.00	—
1967–68	Conception Bay CeeBees	Nfld-Sr	40	20	17	3	2400	180	2	4.50	—	6	2	4	360	36	0	6.00	—
1968–69	Conception Bay CeeBees	Nfld-Sr	40	8	27	5	2400	233	0	5.83	—	—	—	—	—	—	—	—	—
1969–70	Calgary Stampeders	ASHL	38	30	8	0	2280	113	0	2.97	—	—	—	—	—	—	—	—	—
1970–71	San Diego Gulls	WHL	14	5	6	0	717	41	0	3.43	.893	—	—	—	—	—	—	—	—
1971–72	Calgary Stampeders	AHL	21	—	—	—	1260	66	2	2.90	—	—	—	—	—	—	—	—	—
1972–73	Phoenix Roadrunners	WHL	36	18	15	2	2078	119	3	3.44	.874	3	1	1	166	10	0	3.61	—
1973–74	Tulsa Oilers	CHL	1	0	1	0	60	7	0	7.00	—	—	—	—	—	—	—	—	—
1973–74	Phoenix Roadrunners	WHL	49	28	17	2	2861	143	0	3.00	.898	9	8	1	566	22	2	2.33	—
1974–75	California Golden Seals	NHL	34	10	21	3	2026	124	2	3.67	.895	—	—	—	—	—	—	—	—
1975–76	California Golden Seals	NHL	40	15	19	5	2354	131	2	3.34	.889	—	—	—	—	—	—	—	—
1976–77	Cleveland Barons	NHL	15	2	8	4	839	51	1	3.65	.885	—	—	—	—	—	—	—	—
1976–77	Los Angeles Kings	NHL	4	1	2	1	240	16	0	4.00	.864	1	0	0	20	1	0	3.00	.857
1977–78	Los Angeles Kings	NHL	14	2	7	2	689	44	0	3.83	.869	—	—	—	—	—	—	—	—
1978–79	Springfield Indians	AHL	5	2	2	1	306	13	0	2.55	.898	—	—	—	—	—	—	—	—
NHL totals			107	30	57	15	6148	366	5	3.57	.888	1	0	0	20	1	0	3.00	.857
