= Mark Heaslip =

American ice hockey player (born 1951)

- Born: December 26, 1951 (age 74) Duluth, Minnesota, U.S.
- Height: 5 ft 10 in (178 cm)
- Weight: 190 lb (86 kg; 13 st 8 lb)
- Position: Right wing
- Shot: Right
- Played for: New York Rangers; Los Angeles Kings
- National team: United States
- NHL draft: Undrafted
- Playing career: 1973–1980

Mark Patrick Heaslip (born December 26, 1951) is an American former professional ice hockey forward who played 117 games in the National Hockey League (NHL) for the New York Rangers and Los Angeles Kings between 1976 and 1979. The rest of his career, which lasted from 1973 to 1980, was spent in the minor leagues. Internationally he played for the American national team at the 1977 World Championships.

== Career statistics ==
=== Regular season and playoffs ===
			Regular season					Playoffs
Season	Team	League	GP	G	A	Pts	PIM	GP	G	A	Pts	PIM
1968–69	Duluth East High School	HS-MN	—	—	—	—	—	—	—	—	—	—
1970–71	University of Minnesota-Duluth	WCHA	—	—	—	—	—	—	—	—	—	—
1971–72	University of Minnesota-Duluth	WCHA	33	8	18	26	37	—	—	—	—	—
1972–73	University of Minnesota-Duluth	WCHA	36	25	20	45	46	—	—	—	—	—
1973–74	Springfield Kings	AHL	76	19	31	50	110	—	—	—	—	—
1974–75	Springfield Indians	AHL	75	18	39	57	86	17	2	11	13	15
1975–76	Fort Worth Texans	CHL	43	7	14	21	32	—	—	—	—	—
1975–76	Oklahoma City Blazers	CHL	33	3	8	11	16	4	0	0	0	12
1976–77	New York Rangers	NHL	19	1	0	1	31	—	—	—	—	—
1976–77	New Haven Nighthawks	AHL	24	8	16	24	35	6	1	1	2	6
1976–77	American National Team	Intl	10	0	1	1	8	—	—	—	—	—
1977–78	New York Rangers	NHL	29	5	10	15	34	3	0	0	0	0
1977–78	New Haven Nighthawks	AHL	50	8	23	31	18	—	—	—	—	—
1978–79	Los Angeles Kings	NHL	69	4	9	13	45	2	0	0	0	2
1979–80	Tulsa Oilers	CHL	68	14	18	32	33	3	0	0	0	4
AHL totals			225	53	109	162	249	23	3	12	15	21
NHL totals			117	10	19	29	110	5	0	0	0	2

=== International ===
Year	Team	Event	GP	G	A	Pts	PIM
1977	United States	WC	10	0	1	1	8
Senior totals			10	0	1	1	8
