= 1976–77 Chicago Black Hawks season =

National Hockey League team season

1976–77 Chicago Black Hawks
- Division: 3rd Smythe
- Conference: 7th Campbell
- 1976–77 record: 26–43–11
- Home record: 19–16–5
- Road record: 7–27–6
- Goals for: 240
- Goals against: 298

Team information
- General manager: Tommy Ivan
- Coach: Billy Reay (10–19–5); Bill White (16–24–6)
- Captain: Keith Magnuson; Pit Martin and Stan Mikita
- Alternate captains: None
- Arena: Chicago Stadium

Team leaders
- Goals: Darcy Rota and Ivan Boldirev (24)
- Assists: Ivan Boldirev (38)
- Points: Ivan Boldirev (62)
- Penalty minutes: Phil Russell (233)
- Plus/minus: Bobby Orr (+6)
- Wins: Tony Esposito (25)
- Goals against average: Tony Esposito (3.45)

The 1976–77 Chicago Black Hawks season was the Hawks' 51st season in the NHL, and the club was coming off a 32–30–18 record in 1975–76, earning 82 points, and finishing in first place in the Smythe Division. In the playoffs, the Black Hawks were quickly swept out in four games by the Montreal Canadiens in the NHL quarter-finals.

During the off-season, the Hawks made a big free agent signing, as the club signed eight time Norris Trophy winner Bobby Orr. Orr missed the majority of the 1975–76 due to a knee injury, as he was limited to ten games in his final season with the Boston Bruins. The team also named Keith Magnuson to become a tri-captain, joining Stan Mikita and Pit Martin in that role. The NHL also made a few changes, as the Kansas City Scouts were relocated to Denver, Colorado, and renamed the Colorado Rockies, while the California Seals moved to Cleveland, Ohio, and were renamed the Cleveland Barons.

The Black Hawks got off to a solid start to the season, as in the month of October, they had a 7–5–1 record, however, injuries took a toll on the team, and the Hawks fell into a slump. The Hawks went 3–14–4 in their next 21 games which cost longtime head coach Billy Reay his job. Reay had been with Chicago since 1963, and left the team with a record of 516-335-161 in his fourteen seasons with the club. He was replaced by recently retired Black Hawks defenseman Bill White, who played with the team from 1969 to 1975. Under White, the Hawks played better hockey, as they went 13–12–5 in his first 30 games, however, the team would go on an eight-game losing streak, and find themselves battling the Vancouver Canucks for the final playoff spot in the Smythe Division. The Hawks eventually finished the season with a 26–43–11 record, earning 63 points, and squeaked into the post-season. The 26 victories and 63 points was their fewest total since the team won 24 games and earned 55 points in 1957–58, while their 43 losses was their highest since losing 51 games in 1953–54.

Offensively, the Black Hawks were led by Ivan Boldirev, who had a team high 24 goals, 38 assists and 62 points. Darcy Rota tied Boldirev for the team lead in goals, as he also scored 24 times, while earning 46 points. Pit Martin had 17 goals and 53 points, while Stan Mikita had 19 goals and 49 points while appearing in only 57 games. On defense, Dick Redmond led the way, scoring 22 goals and 47 points, while Phil Russell had 9 goals and 45 points from the blueline, along with a team high 233 penalty minutes. Bobby Orr, limited to only 20 games, earned 23 points, while posting a team best +6 rating.

In goal, Tony Esposito played the majority of the games, winning 25 games, while registering a GAA of 3.45, and earning two shutouts.

The Hawks opened the playoffs in a best of three preliminary series against the New York Islanders, who finished in second place in the Patrick Division with 106 points, which was 43 more than the Hawks. The series opened with two games at Nassau Veterans Memorial Coliseum in New York, and the Islanders made quick work of the Hawks in the first game, easily winning 5–2 to take the series lead. New York would then complete the two-game sweep, narrowly defeating the Hawks 2–1 in the second game, as Chicago was swept out of the playoffs for the second consecutive season. The Black Hawks were originally scheduled as the home team for the second game, but its home rink Chicago Stadium had already been booked that night for the second of three Led Zeppelin concerts.

== Season standings ==
Smythe Division
	GP	W	L	T	GF	GA	Pts
**St. Louis Blues**	80	32	39	9	239	276	73
**Minnesota North Stars**	80	23	39	18	240	310	64
**Chicago Black Hawks**	80	26	43	11	240	298	63
Vancouver Canucks	80	25	42	13	235	294	63
Colorado Rockies	80	20	46	14	226	307	54

Note: GP = Games played, W = Wins, L = Losses, T = Ties, Pts = Points, GF = Goals for, GA = Goals against
Note: Teams that qualified for the playoffs are highlighted in bold.

== Record vs. opponents ==
Smythe Division record vs. opponents

**Vs. Campbell Conference**

**Vs. Wales Conference**

**Vs. Smythe Division**

1976–77 NHL records
Team	**CHI**	**COL**	**MIN**	**STL**	**VAN**	**Total**
Chicago	—	2–2–2	2–3–1	2–4	1–4–1	**7–13–4**
Colorado	2–2–2	—	3–2–1	1–4–1	2–2–2	**8–10–6**
Minnesota	3–2–1	2–3–1	—	2–2–2	1–4–1	**8–11–5**
St. Louis	4–2	4–1–1	2–2–2	—	4–1–1	**14–6–4**
Vancouver	4–1–1	2–2–2	4–1–1	1–4–1	—	**11–8–5**

**Vs. Patrick Division**

1976–77 NHL records
Team	**ATL**	**NYI**	**NYR**	**PHI**	**Total**
Chicago	2–3	1–3–1	2–2–1	0–3–2	**5–11–4**
Colorado	1–3–1	0–5	1–3–1	0–5	**2–16–2**
Minnesota	1–2–2	1–3–1	0–5	0–3–2	**2–13–5**
St. Louis	1–4	1–3–1	2–2–1	0–5	**4–14–2**
Vancouver	3–1–1	1–4	2–3	0–4–1	**6–12–2**

**Vs. Adams Division**

1976–77 NHL records
Team	**BOS**	**BUF**	**CLE**	**TOR**	**Total**
Chicago	0–4	1–3	1–3	2–1–1	**4–11–1**
Colorado	1–3	0–3–1	1–2–1	1–2–1	**3–10–3**
Minnesota	2–1–1	1–2–1	1–1–2	1–3	**5–7–4**
St. Louis	1–2–1	2–2	1–2–1	2–2	**6–8–2**
Vancouver	0–4	0–3–1	1–2–1	1–2–1	**2–11–3**

**Vs. Norris Division**

1976–77 NHL records
Team	**DET**	**LAK**	**MTL**	**PIT**	**WSH**	**Total**
Chicago	4–0	2–2	0–3–1	2–2	2–1–1	**10–8–2**
Colorado	4–0	0–2–2	0–3–1	2–2	1–3	**7–10–3**
Minnesota	3–0–1	3–1	0–3–1	1–3	1–1–2	**8–8–4**
St. Louis	3–0–1	2–2	1–3	1–3	1–3	**8–11–1**
Vancouver	1–3	2–0–2	0–4	1–2–1	2–2	**6–11–3**

== Schedule and results ==
=== Regular season ===
1976–77 regular season
October

Game	Date	Visitor	Score	Home	Record	Points
1	October 7	Chicago Black Hawks	6–4	St. Louis Blues	1–0–0	2
2	October 9	Chicago Black Hawks	1–2	New York Islanders	1–1–0	2
3	October 10	Vancouver Canucks	1–5	Chicago Black Hawks	2–1–0	4
4	October 13	Pittsburgh Penguins	1–4	Chicago Black Hawks	3–1–0	6
5	October 15	Chicago Black Hawks	3–5	Colorado Rockies	3–2–0	6
6	October 17	Minnesota North Stars	0–3	Chicago Black Hawks	4–2–0	8
7	October 19	Chicago Black Hawks	0–3	Cleveland Barons	4–3–0	8
8	October 21	Chicago Black Hawks	1–5	Philadelphia Flyers	4–4–0	8
9	October 23	Chicago Black Hawks	3–4	Minnesota North Stars	4–5–0	8
10	October 24	St. Louis Blues	2–7	Chicago Black Hawks	5–5–0	10
11	October 27	Montreal Canadiens	4–4	Chicago Black Hawks	5–5–1	11
12	October 30	Chicago Black Hawks	6–5	Detroit Red Wings	6–5–1	13
13	October 31	Washington Capitals	4–5	Chicago Black Hawks	7–5–1	15

November

Game	Date	Visitor	Score	Home	Record	Points
14	November 4	Chicago Black Hawks	5–7	Boston Bruins	7–6–1	15
15	November 6	Chicago Black Hawks	3–11	Montreal Canadiens	7–7–1	15
16	November 7	Colorado Rockies	3–2	Chicago Black Hawks	7–8–1	15
17	November 10	Philadelphia Flyers	2–2	Chicago Black Hawks	7–8–2	16
18	November 12	Chicago Black Hawks	5–4	Washington Capitals	8–8–2	18
19	November 14	Los Angeles Kings	4–5	Chicago Black Hawks	9–8–2	20
20	November 17	Chicago Black Hawks	2–3	New York Rangers	9–9–2	20
21	November 19	Chicago Black Hawks	3–5	Atlanta Flames	9–10–2	20
22	November 21	Chicago Black Hawks	0–5	Pittsburgh Penguins	9–11–2	20
23	November 24	Chicago Black Hawks	5–4	Los Angeles Kings	10–11–2	22
24	November 27	Chicago Black Hawks	3–4	Vancouver Canucks	10–12–2	22

December

Game	Date	Visitor	Score	Home	Record	Points
25	December 1	Boston Bruins	5–3	Chicago Black Hawks	10–13–2	22
26	December 4	Chicago Black Hawks	2–2	Toronto Maple Leafs	10–13–3	23
27	December 5	Vancouver Canucks	4–2	Chicago Black Hawks	10–14–3	23
28	December 8	Montreal Canadiens	4–3	Chicago Black Hawks	10–15–3	23
29	December 11	Chicago Black Hawks	1–3	Atlanta Flames	10–16–3	23
30	December 12	New York Islanders	6–2	Chicago Black Hawks	10–17–3	23
31	December 16	Chicago Black Hawks	1–4	Philadelphia Flyers	10–18–3	23
32	December 18	New York Rangers	3–3	Chicago Black Hawks	10–18–4	24
33	December 19	St. Louis Blues	6–4	Chicago Black Hawks	10–19–4	24
34	December 21	Chicago Black Hawks	3–3	Minnesota North Stars	10–19–5	25
35	December 22	Buffalo Sabres	4–2	Chicago Black Hawks	10–20–5	25
36	December 26	Colorado Rockies	3–5	Chicago Black Hawks	11–20–5	27
37	December 29	Detroit Red Wings	3–6	Chicago Black Hawks	12–20–5	29
38	December 31	Chicago Black Hawks	2–2	Colorado Rockies	12–20–6	30

January

Game	Date	Visitor	Score	Home	Record	Points
39	January 2	Toronto Maple Leafs	4–6	Chicago Black Hawks	13–20–6	32
40	January 5	Buffalo Sabres	1–2	Chicago Black Hawks	14–20–6	34
41	January 8	Chicago Black Hawks	2–4	Pittsburgh Penguins	14–21–6	34
42	January 9	Boston Bruins	4–2	Chicago Black Hawks	14–22–6	34
43	January 12	New York Islanders	1–2	Chicago Black Hawks	15–22–6	36
44	January 15	Chicago Black Hawks	4–1	Toronto Maple Leafs	16–22–6	38
45	January 16	New York Rangers	5–2	Chicago Black Hawks	16–23–6	38
46	January 18	Chicago Black Hawks	7–7	Colorado Rockies	16–23–7	39
47	January 19	St. Louis Blues	5–3	Chicago Black Hawks	16–24–7	39
48	January 22	Chicago Black Hawks	3–0	Detroit Red Wings	17–24–7	41
49	January 23	Philadelphia Flyers	2–2	Chicago Black Hawks	17–24–8	42
50	January 27	Chicago Black Hawks	1–1	Vancouver Canucks	17–24–9	43
51	January 30	Cleveland Barons	3–9	Chicago Black Hawks	18–24–9	45

February

Game	Date	Visitor	Score	Home	Record	Points
52	February 2	Atlanta Flames	2–4	Chicago Black Hawks	19–24–9	47
53	February 3	Chicago Black Hawks	0–6	Philadelphia Flyers	19–25–9	47
54	February 5	Chicago Black Hawks	3–5	Cleveland Barons	19–26–9	47
55	February 6	Minnesota North Stars	3–0	Chicago Black Hawks	19–27–9	47
56	February 9	Washington Capitals	4–4	Chicago Black Hawks	19–27–10	48
57	February 12	Colorado Rockies	2–4	Chicago Black Hawks	20–27–10	50
58	February 13	Atlanta Flames	2–4	Chicago Black Hawks	21–27–10	52
59	February 15	Chicago Black Hawks	1–5	St. Louis Blues	21–28–10	52
60	February 16	Chicago Black Hawks	0–3	Buffalo Sabres	21–29–10	52
61	February 19	Chicago Black Hawks	2–6	Minnesota North Stars	21–30–10	52
62	February 20	Toronto Maple Leafs	10–8	Chicago Black Hawks	21–31–10	52
63	February 23	Detroit Red Wings	2–5	Chicago Black Hawks	22–31–10	54
64	February 26	New York Rangers	1–2	Chicago Black Hawks	23–31–10	56
65	February 27	Vancouver Canucks	4–3	Chicago Black Hawks	23–32–10	56

March

Game	Date	Visitor	Score	Home	Record	Points
66	March 2	Chicago Black Hawks	3–6	Buffalo Sabres	23–33–10	56
67	March 3	Chicago Black Hawks	4–7	Washington Capitals	23–34–10	56
68	March 6	Chicago Black Hawks	2–6	Boston Bruins	23–35–10	56
69	March 8	Chicago Black Hawks	1–7	Los Angeles Kings	23–36–10	56
70	March 10	Chicago Black Hawks	0–5	Vancouver Canucks	23–37–10	56
71	March 12	Chicago Black Hawks	1–5	Montreal Canadiens	23–38–10	56
72	March 16	New York Islanders	5–0	Chicago Black Hawks	23–39–10	56
73	March 19	Chicago Black Hawks	2–2	New York Islanders	23–39–11	57
74	March 20	Pittsburgh Penguins	2–3	Chicago Black Hawks	24–39–11	59
75	March 23	Los Angeles Kings	3–1	Chicago Black Hawks	24–40–11	59
76	March 26	Minnesota North Stars	2–7	Chicago Black Hawks	25–40–11	61
77	March 27	Chicago Black Hawks	5–3	New York Rangers	26–40–11	63
78	March 30	Chicago Black Hawks	1–4	St. Louis Blues	26–41–11	63

April

Game	Date	Visitor	Score	Home	Record	Points
79	April 1	Chicago Black Hawks	4–6	Atlanta Flames	26–42–11	63
80	April 3	Cleveland Barons	4–2	Chicago Black Hawks	26–43–11	63

**Legend**: Win (2 points) Loss (0 points) Tie (1 point)

=== Playoffs ===
1977 Stanley Cup playoffs
Preliminary round vs. (1) New York Islanders – Islanders win 2–0

Game	Date	Visitor	Score	Home	Series
1	April 5	Chicago Black Hawks	2–5	New York Islanders	0–1
2	April 7	Chicago Black Hawks	1–2	New York Islanders	0–2

**Legend**: Win Loss

== Season stats ==
=== Scoring leaders ===
Player	GP	G	A	Pts	PIM
Ivan Boldirev	80	24	38	62	40
Pit Martin	75	17	36	53	22
Stan Mikita	57	19	30	49	20
Dick Redmond	80	22	25	47	30
Darcy Rota	76	24	22	46	82

=== Goaltending ===
**Player**	**GP**	**TOI**	**W**	**L**	**T**	**GA**	**SO**	**GAA**
Tony Esposito	69	4067	25	36	8	234	2	3.45
Michel Dumas	5	241	0	1	2	17	0	4.23
Mike Veisor	3	180	1	2	0	13	0	4.33
Gilles Villemure	6	312	0	4	1	28	0	5.38

== Playoff stats ==
=== Scoring leaders ===
Player	GP	G	A	Pts	PIM
Kirk Bowman	2	1	0	1	0
Dennis Hull	2	1	0	1	0
Grant Mulvey	2	1	0	1	2
Dale Tallon	2	0	1	1	0
Bob Murray	2	0	1	1	2

=== Goaltending ===
**Player**	**GP**	**TOI**	**W**	**L**	**GA**	**SO**	**GAA**
Tony Esposito	2	120	0	2	6	0	3.00

== Draft picks ==
Chicago's draft picks at the 1976 NHL amateur draft at the NHL Office in Montreal.

Round	#	Player	Nationality	College/junior/club team (league)
1	9	Réal Cloutier	Canada	Quebec Nordiques (WHA)
2	27	Jeff McDill	Canada	Victoria Cougars (WCHL)
3	45	Thomas Gradin	Sweden	Modo Hockey (Sweden)
4	63	Dave Debol	United States	University of Michigan (NCAA)
5	81	Terry McDonald	Canada	Edmonton Oil Kings (WCHL)
6	99	John Peterson	Canada	University of Notre Dame (NCAA)
7	115	John Rothstein	United States	University of Minnesota-Duluth (NCAA)

== Sources ==
- Hockey-Reference
- Rauzulu's Street
- Goalies Archive
- HockeyDB
- National Hockey League Guide & Record Book 2007
