= 1976–77 New York Rangers season =

NHL hockey team season

1976–77 New York Rangers
- Division: 4th Patrick
- Conference: 5th Campbell
- 1976–77 record: 29–37–14
- Home record: 17–18–5
- Road record: 12–19–9
- Goals for: 272
- Goals against: 310

Team information
- General manager: John Ferguson
- Coach: John Ferguson
- Captain: Phil Esposito
- Alternate captains: None
- Arena: Madison Square Garden

Team leaders
- Goals: Phil Esposito (34)
- Assists: Rod Gilbert (48)
- Points: Phil Esposito (80)
- Penalty minutes: Nick Fotiu (174)
- Wins: John Davidson (14)
- Goals against average: Doug Soetaert (2.95)

The 1976–77 New York Rangers season was the franchise's 51st season. The Rangers placed fourth in the Patrick Division and did not qualify for the playoffs for the second year in a row for the first time since the 1964–65 season and the 1965–66 season. The Rangers had a better regular season record than two playoff teams and the league would change the rules in the following season to place the top twelve teams in the playoffs, regardless of division.

== Regular season ==
=== Season standings ===
Patrick Division
	GP	W	L	T	GF	GA	Pts
**Philadelphia Flyers**	80	48	16	16	323	213	112
**New York Islanders**	80	47	21	12	288	193	106
**Atlanta Flames**	80	34	34	12	264	265	80
New York Rangers	80	29	37	14	272	310	72

Note: GP = Games played, W = Wins, L = Losses, T = Ties, Pts = Points, GF = Goals for, GA = Goals against
Note: Teams that qualified for the playoffs are highlighted in bold.

=== Record vs. opponents ===
Patrick Division record vs. opponents

**Vs. Campbell Conference**

**Vs. Wales Conference**

**Vs. Patrick Division**

1976–77 NHL records
Team	**ATL**	**NYI**	**NYR**	**PHI**	**Total**
Atlanta	—	0–6	4–1–1	2–2–2	**6–9–3**
N.Y. Islanders	6–0	—	4–1–1	3–2–1	**13–3–2**
N.Y. Rangers	1–4–1	1–4–1	—	0–2–4	**2–10–6**
Philadelphia	2–2–2	2–3–1	2–0–4	—	**6–5–7**

**Vs. Smythe Division**

1976–77 NHL records
Team	**CHI**	**COL**	**MIN**	**STL**	**VAN**	**Total**
Atlanta	3–2	3–1–1	2–1–2	4–1	1–3–1	**13–8–4**
N.Y. Islanders	3–1–1	5–0	3–1–1	3–1–1	4–1	**18–4–3**
N.Y. Rangers	2–2–1	3–1–1	5–0	2–2–1	3–2	**15–7–3**
Philadelphia	3–0–2	5–0	3–0–2	5–0	4–0–1	**20–0–5**

**Vs. Adams Division**

1976–77 NHL records
Team	**BOS**	**BUF**	**CLE**	**TOR**	**Total**
Atlanta	2–2	1–2–1	1–2–1	1–4	**5–10–2**
N.Y. Islanders	2–1–1	3–1–1	3–0–1	1–2–1	**9–4–4**
N.Y. Rangers	0–4–1	0–4	3–0–1	2–1–1	**5–9–3**
Philadelphia	3–1	2–2	3–1–1	2–1–1	**10–5–2**

**Vs. Norris Division**

1976–77 NHL records
Team	**DET**	**LAK**	**MTL**	**PIT**	**WSH**	**Total**
Atlanta	2–1–1	2–2	0–3–1	3–0–1	3–1	**10–7–3**
N.Y. Islanders	2–2	2–2	0–4	2–2	1–0–3	**7–10–3**
N.Y. Rangers	3–1	0–3–1	1–3	1–2–1	2–2	**7–11–2**
Philadelphia	3–1	4–0	0–4	3–1	2–0–2	**12–6–2**

== Schedule and results ==
1976–77 regular season
October: 5–7–1 (home: 2–5–0; road: 3–2–1)

Game	October	Opponent	Score	Record
1	6	Minnesota North Stars	6–5	1–0–0
2	8	@ Colorado Rockies	5–3	2–0–0
3	9	@ St. Louis Blues	2–1	2–1–0
4	12	@ Minnesota North Stars	10–4	3–1–0
5	13	Boston Bruins	5–1	3–2–0
6	16	@ Montreal Canadiens	7–4	3–3–0
7	17	Colorado Rockies	4–3	4–3–0
8	20	Los Angeles Kings	4–2	4–4–0
9	24	Vancouver Canucks	5–4	4–5–0
10	26	@ Cleveland Barons	5–2	5–5–0
11	27	Boston Bruins	4–3	5–6–0
12	30	@ Pittsburgh Penguins	2–2	5–6–1
13	31	Detroit Red Wings	6–5	5–7–1

November: 5–4–3 (home: 2–3–0; road: 3–1–3)

Game	November	Opponent	Score	Record
14	3	@ Vancouver Canucks	6–1	6–7–1
15	6	@ Los Angeles Kings	3–3	6–7–2
16	10	Washington Capitals	7–5	6–8–2
17	13	Buffalo Sabres	6–2	6–9–2
18	14	Pittsburgh Penguins	5–1	6–10–2
19	17	Chicago Black Hawks	3–2	7–10–2
20	20	@ St. Louis Blues	3–1	7–11–2
21	22	@ Vancouver Canucks	3–2	8–11–2
22	24	@ Philadelphia Flyers	2–2	8–11–3
23	27	@ Detroit Red Wings	5–0	9–11–3
24	28	Minnesota North Stars	4–1	10–11–3
25	30	@ Atlanta Flames	2–2	10–11–4

December: 5–4–6 (home: 3–2–3; road: 2–2–3)

Game	December	Opponent	Score	Record
26	1	Washington Capitals	4–1	11–11–4
27	4	@ Minnesota North Stars	11–4	12–11–4
28	5	Toronto Maple Leafs	5–5	12–11–5
29	8	St. Louis Blues	4–4	12–11–6
30	11	@ Toronto Maple Leafs	4–1	12–12–6
31	12	Montreal Canadiens	5–2	13–12–6
32	14	@ New York Islanders	4–4	13–12–7
33	16	@ Buffalo Sabres	7–2	13–13–7
34	18	@ Chicago Black Hawks	3–3	13–13–8
35	19	Cleveland Barons	3–2	14–13–8
36	22	Philadelphia Flyers	3–3	14–13–9
37	23	@ Boston Bruins	3–3	14–13–10
38	26	New York Islanders	2–1	14–14–10
39	28	@ Washington Capitals	5–2	15–14–10
40	31	Atlanta Flames	4–2	15–15–10

January: 3–6–3 (home: 2–2–1; road: 1–4–2)

Game	January	Opponent	Score	Record
41	2	Vancouver Canucks	5–3	16–15–10
42	5	Philadelphia Flyers	4–4	16–15–11
43	7	@ Colorado Rockies	4–4	16–15–12
44	9	Los Angeles Kings	5–4	16–16–12
45	12	@ Atlanta Flames	6–1	16–17–12
46	13	@ Buffalo Sabres	7–5	16–18–12
47	16	@ Chicago Black Hawks	5–2	17–18–12
48	19	@ Cleveland Barons	3–3	17–18–13
49	22	@ Los Angeles Kings	6–0	17–19–13
50	23	@ Vancouver Canucks	6–2	17–20–13
51	27	Pittsburgh Penguins	3–0	17–21–13
52	30	St. Louis Blues	5–2	18–21–13

February: 5–7–0 (home: 3–2–0; road: 2–5–0)

Game	February	Opponent	Score	Record
53	1	@ Colorado Rockies	5–2	18–22–13
54	3	@ New York Islanders	6–3	18–23–13
55	6	New York Islanders	4–0	19–23–13
56	9	Buffalo Sabres	2–1	19–24–13
57	10	@ Detroit Red Wings	5–4	20–24–13
58	13	Toronto Maple Leafs	8–3	21–24–13
59	17	@ Philadelphia Flyers	7–1	21–25–13
60	19	@ New York Islanders	5–2	21–26–13
61	20	Detroit Red Wings	3–2	22–26–13
62	23	@ Toronto Maple Leafs	5–4	23–26–13
63	26	@ Chicago Black Hawks	2–1	23–27–13
64	27	Montreal Canadiens	8–1	23–28–13

March: 6–7–1 (home: 5–3–1; road: 1–4–0)

Game	March	Opponent	Score	Record
65	3	Boston Bruins	4–1	23–29–13
66	5	@ Montreal Canadiens	7–2	23–30–13
67	6	Cleveland Barons	4–3	24–30–13
68	9	Minnesota North Stars	6–4	25–30–13
69	10	@ Boston Bruins	10–3	25–31–13
70	12	@ Atlanta Flames	6–3	25–32–13
71	13	Atlanta Flames	5–3	25–33–13
72	16	Philadelphia Flyers	4–4	25–33–14
73	19	@ Pittsburgh Penguins	5–2	26–33–14
74	20	St. Louis Blues	5–3	27–33–14
75	23	Colorado Rockies	5–3	28–33–14
76	25	@ Washington Capitals	7–2	28–34–14
77	27	Chicago Black Hawks	5–3	28–35–14
78	30	Atlanta Flames	4–3	29–35–14

April: 0–2–0 (home: 0–1–0; road: 0–1–0)

Game	April	Opponent	Score	Record
79	2	@ Philadelphia Flyers	4–1	29–36–14
80	3	New York Islanders	5–2	29–37–14

Legend: Win (2 points) Loss (0 points) Tie (1 point)

== Player statistics ==
Skaters

Regular season
Player	GP	G	A	Pts	PIM
Phil Esposito	80	34	46	80	52
Rod Gilbert	77	27	48	75	50
Ken Hodge	78	21	41	62	43
Don Murdoch	59	32	24	56	47
Steve Vickers	75	22	31	53	26
Walt Tkaczuk	80	12	38	50	38
Carol Vadnais	74	11	37	48	131
Ron Greschner	80	11	36	47	89
Wayne Dillon	78	17	29	46	33
Mike McEwen	80	14	29	43	38
Pat Hickey	80	23	17	40	35
Greg Polis	77	16	23	39	44
Bill Goldsworthy^{†}	61	10	12	22	43
Dave Maloney	66	3	18	21	100
Dave Farrish	80	2	17	19	102
Dan Newman	41	9	8	17	37
Pete Stemkowski	61	2	13	15	8
Nick Fotiu	70	4	8	12	174
Bill Fairbairn^{‡}	9	1	2	3	0
Mark Heaslip	19	1	0	1	31
Larry Huras	2	0	0	0	0
Larry Sacharuk	2	0	0	0	0
John Bednarski	5	0	0	0	0
Greg Holst	5	0	0	0	0
Nick Beverley^{‡}	9	0	0	0	2
Doug Jarrett	9	0	0	0	4

Goaltenders

Regular season
Player	GP	TOI	W	L	T	GA	GAA	SO
Gilles Gratton	41	2034	11	18	7	143	4.22	0
John Davidson	39	2116	14	14	6	125	3.54	1
Doug Soetaert	12	570	3	4	1	28	2.95	1
Dave Tataryn	2	80	1	1	0	10	7.50	0

^{†}Denotes player spent time with another team before joining Rangers. Stats reflect time with Rangers only.
^{‡}Traded mid-season. Stats reflect time with Rangers only.

Note:

Pos = Position;GP = Games played; G = Goals; A = Assists; Pts = Points; PIM = Penalty minutes; +/- = Plus/minus; PPG = Power-play goals; SHG = Short-handed goals; GWG = Game-winning goals
Pos = Position;GP = Games played; Min, TOI = Minutes played; W = Wins; L = Losses; T,T/OT = Ties; OTL = Overtime losses; GA = Goals-against; GAA = Goals-against average; SO = Shutouts; SA = Shots against; SV = Shots saved;SV% = Save percentage;

== Draft picks ==
New York's picks at the 1976 NHL amateur draft in Montreal, Canada.

Round	#	Player	Position	Nationality	College/Junior/Club team (League)
1	6	Don Murdoch	RW	Canada	Medicine Hat Tigers (WCHL)
2	24	Dave Farrish	D	Canada	Sudbury Wolves (OHA)
3	42	Mike McEwen	D	Canada	Toronto Marlboros (OHA)
4	60	Claude Periard	LW	Canada	Trois-Rivières Draveurs (QMJHL)
5	78	Doug Caines	C	Canada	St. Catharines Black Hawks (OHA)
6	96	Barry Scully	RW	Canada	Kingston Canadians (OHA)
7	112	Remi Levesque	C	Canada	Quebec Remparts (QMJHL)
