= 1976–77 Toronto Maple Leafs season =

NHL hockey team season

1976–77 Toronto Maple Leafs
- Division: 3rd Adams
- Conference: 5th Wales
- 1976–77 record: 33–32–15
- Home record: 18–13–9
- Road record: 15–19–6
- Goals for: 301
- Goals against: 285

Team information
- General manager: Jim Gregory
- Coach: Red Kelly
- Captain: Darryl Sittler
- Alternate captains: None
- Arena: Maple Leaf Gardens

Team leaders
- Goals: Lanny McDonald (46)
- Assists: Borje Salming (66)
- Points: Darryl Sittler and Lanny McDonald (90)
- Penalty minutes: Tiger Williams (338)
- Wins: Mike Palmateer (23)
- Goals against average: Mike Palmateer (3.21)

The 1976–77 Toronto Maple Leafs season was the franchise's 60th season, 50th as the Maple Leafs. The Leafs finished in third place in the Adams Division with a record of 33 wins, 32 losses and 15 ties for 81 points, qualifying for the playoffs for the fourth consecutive year. In the playoffs, they defeated the Pittsburgh Penguins in the preliminary round 2–1 before falling to the Philadelphia Flyers in six games in the Quarter-finals.

== Regular season ==
On February 2, 1977, Toronto Maple Leafs defenceman Ian Turnbull would be the first player in NHL history to score five goals on five shots. His five goals in one game against the Detroit Red Wings still stands as the single-game record for goals by a defenceman.

=== Season standings ===
Adams Division
	GP	W	L	T	GF	GA	Pts
**Boston Bruins**	80	49	23	8	312	240	106
**Buffalo Sabres**	80	48	24	8	301	220	104
**Toronto Maple Leafs**	80	33	32	15	301	285	81
Cleveland Barons	80	25	42	13	240	292	63

Note: GP = Games played, W = Wins, L = Losses, T = Ties, Pts = Points, GF = Goals for, GA = Goals against
Note: Teams that qualified for the playoffs are highlighted in bold.

=== Record vs. opponents ===
Adams Division record vs. opponents

**Vs. Wales Conference**

**Vs. Campbell Conference**

**Vs. Adams Division**

1976–77 NHL records
Team	**BOS**	**BUF**	**CLE**	**TOR**	**Total**
Boston	—	3–3	5–1	3–2–1	**11–6–1**
Buffalo	3–3	—	5–1	5–0–1	**13–4–1**
Cleveland	1–5	1–5	—	2–4	**4–14–0**
Toronto	2–3–1	0–5–1	4–2	—	**6–10–1**

**Vs. Norris Division**

1976–77 NHL records
Team	**DET**	**LAK**	**MTL**	**PIT**	**WSH**	**Total**
Boston	4–1	2–2–1	3–2	3–1–1	4–0–1	**16–6–3**
Buffalo	4–1	3–2	2–2–1	0–4–1	4–1	**13–10–2**
Cleveland	2–3	1–2–2	0–5	0–3–2	5–0	**8–13–4**
Toronto	3–1–1	2–1–2	1–2–2	1–2–2	2–3	**9–9–7**

**Vs. Patrick Division**

1976–77 NHL records
Team	**ATL**	**NYI**	**NYR**	**PHI**	**Total**
Boston	2–2	1–2–1	4–0–1	1–3	**8–7–2**
Buffalo	2–1–1	1–3–1	4–0	2–2	**9–6–2**
Cleveland	2–1–1	0–3–1	0–3–1	1–3–1	**3–10–4**
Toronto	4–1	2–1–1	1–2–1	1–2–1	**8–6–3**

**Vs. Smythe Division**

1976–77 NHL records
Team	**CHI**	**COL**	**MIN**	**STL**	**VAN**	**Total**
Boston	4–0	3–1	1–2–1	2–1–1	4–0	**14–4–2**
Buffalo	3–1	3–0–1	2–1–1	2–2	3–0–1	**13–4–3**
Cleveland	3–1	2–1–1	1–1–2	2–1–1	2–1–1	**10–5–5**
Toronto	1–2–1	2–1–1	3–1	2–2	2–1–1	**10–7–3**

== Schedule and results ==
1976–77 regular season
October

Game	Result	Date	Score	Opponent	Record
1	L	October 5, 1976	2–4	@ Colorado Rockies (1976–77)	0–1–0
2	W	October 9, 1976	7–5	Boston Bruins (1976–77)	1–1–0
3	T	October 13, 1976	4–4	Los Angeles Kings (1976–77)	1–1–1
4	L	October 15, 1976	3–5	@ Boston Bruins (1976–77)	1–2–1
5	T	October 16, 1976	5–5	Philadelphia Flyers (1976–77)	1–2–2
6	T	October 20, 1976	4–4	Pittsburgh Penguins (1976–77)	1–2–3
7	L	October 21, 1976	3–5	@ Montreal Canadiens (1976–77)	1–3–3
8	L	October 23, 1976	2–5	New York Islanders (1976–77)	1–4–3
9	L	October 27, 1976	3–5	Minnesota North Stars (1976–77)	1–5–3
10	W	October 28, 1976	3–1	@ Detroit Red Wings (1976–77)	2–5–3
11	W	October 30, 1976	5–1	@ Minnesota North Stars (1976–77)	3–5–3

November

Game	Result	Date	Score	Opponent	Record
12	W	November 1, 1976	6–3	@ Cleveland Barons (1976–77)	4–5–3
13	L	November 3, 1976	2–6	St. Louis Blues (1976–77)	4–6–3
14	W	November 5, 1976	4–2	@ Atlanta Flames (1976–77)	5–6–3
15	L	November 6, 1976	2–3	@ St. Louis Blues (1976–77)	5–7–3
16	T	November 10, 1976	2–2	@ Los Angeles Kings (1976–77)	5–7–4
17	W	November 13, 1976	3–0	@ Vancouver Canucks (1976–77)	6–7–4
18	W	November 17, 1976	1–0	Montreal Canadiens (1976–77)	7–7–4
19	W	November 20, 1976	8–3	Minnesota North Stars (1976–77)	8–7–4
20	L	November 21, 1976	5–9	@ Montreal Canadiens (1976–77)	8–8–4
21	L	November 24, 1976	3–4	@ Detroit Red Wings (1976–77)	8–9–4
22	W	November 27, 1976	4–2	Boston Bruins (1976–77)	9–9–4
23	W	November 28, 1976	5–1	Cleveland Barons (1976–77)	10–9–4
24	W	November 30, 1976	4–2	@ New York Islanders (1976–77)	11–9–4

December

Game	Result	Date	Score	Opponent	Record
25	W	December 1, 1976	6–3	Los Angeles Kings (1976–77)	12–9–4
26	T	December 4, 1976	2–2	Chicago Black Hawks (1976–77)	12–9–5
27	T	December 5, 1976	5–5	@ New York Rangers (1976–77)	12–9–6
28	L	December 8, 1976	3–4	Vancouver Canucks (1976–77)	12–10–6
29	W	December 11, 1976	4–1	New York Rangers (1976–77)	13–10–6
30	L	December 12, 1976	4–7	@ Philadelphia Flyers (1976–77)	13–11–6
31	W	December 15, 1976	4–1	St. Louis Blues (1976–77)	14–11–6
32	L	December 17, 1976	2–3	@ Washington Capitals (1976–77)	14–12–6
33	W	December 18, 1976	4–2	Colorado Rockies (1976–77)	15–12–6
34	W	December 20, 1976	6–2	Atlanta Flames (1976–77)	16–12–6
35	L	December 22, 1976	2–5	Pittsburgh Penguins (1976–77)	16–13–6
36	L	December 23, 1976	2–4	@ Buffalo Sabres (1976–77)	16–14–6
37	L	December 26, 1976	2–4	@ Pittsburgh Penguins (1976–77)	16–15–6
38	W	December 29, 1976	6–2	@ Cleveland Barons (1976–77)	17–15–6

January

Game	Result	Date	Score	Opponent	Record
39	W	January 1, 1977	3–1	Washington Capitals (1976–77)	18–15–6
40	L	January 2, 1977	4–6	@ Chicago Black Hawks (1976–77)	18–16–6
41	W	January 5, 1977	6–4	Colorado Rockies (1976–77)	19–16–6
42	L	January 8, 1977	2–4	Buffalo Sabres (1976–77)	19–17–6
43	W	January 11, 1977	2–0	@ Pittsburgh Penguins (1976–77)	20–17–6
44	W	January 12, 1977	3–2	Los Angeles Kings (1976–77)	21–17–6
45	L	January 15, 1977	1–4	Chicago Black Hawks (1976–77)	21–18–6
46	L	January 18, 1977	3–6	@ Los Angeles Kings (1976–77)	21–19–6
47	W	January 21, 1977	3–1	@ Vancouver Canucks (1976–77)	22–19–6
48	W	January 23, 1977	5–2	@ Minnesota North Stars (1976–77)	23–19–6
49	W	January 27, 1977	2–1	@ New York Islanders (1976–77)	24–19–6
50	T	January 29, 1977	3–3	@ Boston Bruins (1976–77)	24–19–7
51	L	January 31, 1977	3–7	@ Atlanta Flames (1976–77)	24–20–7

February

Game	Result	Date	Score	Opponent	Record
52	W	February 2, 1977	9–1	Detroit Red Wings (1976–77)	25–20–7
53	L	February 5, 1977	5–7	Philadelphia Flyers (1976–77)	25–21–7
54	W	February 9, 1977	5–1	Atlanta Flames (1976–77)	26–21–7
55	W	February 12, 1977	10–0	Washington Capitals (1976–77)	27–21–7
56	L	February 13, 1977	3–8	@ New York Rangers (1976–77)	27–22–7
57	L	February 14, 1977	2–7	@ Buffalo Sabres (1976–77)	27–23–7
58	W	February 16, 1977	5–3	@ Cleveland Barons (1976–77)	28–23–7
59	T	February 17, 1977	2–2	@ Detroit Red Wings (1976–77)	28–23–8
60	T	February 19, 1977	6–6	Pittsburgh Penguins (1976–77)	28–23–9
61	W	February 20, 1977	10–8	@ Chicago Black Hawks (1976–77)	29–23–9
62	L	February 23, 1977	4–5	New York Rangers (1976–77)	29–24–9
63	L	February 25, 1977	2–4	@ Washington Capitals (1976–77)	29–25–9
64	L	February 26, 1977	5–6	Buffalo Sabres (1976–77)	29–26–9

March

Game	Result	Date	Score	Opponent	Record
65	L	March 2, 1977	1–4	Cleveland Barons (1976–77)	29–27–9
66	T	March 5, 1977	4–4	Vancouver Canucks (1976–77)	29–27–10
67	W	March 7, 1977	4–2	@ Philadelphia Flyers (1976–77)	30–27–10
68	T	March 9, 1977	2–2	Montreal Canadiens (1976–77)	30–27–11
69	W	March 12, 1977	6–0	Detroit Red Wings (1976–77)	31–27–11
70	L	March 13, 1977	1–6	@ Buffalo Sabres (1976–77)	31–28–11
71	W	March 15, 1977	4–1	@ St. Louis Blues (1976–77)	32–28–11
72	T	March 16, 1977	4–4	@ Colorado Rockies (1976–77)	32–28–12
73	W	March 19, 1977	5–4	Atlanta Flames (1976–77)	33–28–12
74	L	March 21, 1977	2–7	Cleveland Barons (1976–77)	33–29–12
75	T	March 23, 1977	1–1	New York Islanders (1976–77)	33–29–13
76	L	March 26, 1977	5–7	Boston Bruins (1976–77)	33–30–13
77	L	March 27, 1977	4–7	@ Washington Capitals (1976–77)	33–31–13
78	T	March 30, 1977	3–3	@ Montreal Canadiens (1976–77)	33–31–14

April

Game	Result	Date	Score	Opponent	Record
79	T	April 2, 1977	1–1	Buffalo Sabres (1976–77)	33–31–15
80	L	April 3, 1977	4–7	@ Boston Bruins (1976–77)	33–32–15

Legend: Win (2 points) Loss (0 points) Tie (1 point)

== Player statistics ==
=== Regular season ===
Scoring

Player	Pos	GP	G	A	Pts	PIM	+/-	PPG	SHG	GWG
Lanny McDonald	RW	80	46	44	90	77	12	16	4	5
Darryl Sittler	C	73	38	52	90	89	8	12	1	5
Ian Turnbull	D	80	22	57	79	84	47	4	2	0
Borje Salming	D	76	12	66	78	46	45	1	0	0
Jack Valiquette	C	66	15	30	45	7	5	0	3	1
Jim McKenny	D	76	14	31	45	36	−26	3	0	3
Tiger Williams	LW	77	18	25	43	338	11	1	0	0
Don Ashby	C	76	19	23	42	24	−14	3	0	4
Inge Hammarstrom	LW	78	24	17	41	16	8	5	0	3
Errol Thompson	LW	41	21	16	37	8	−10	8	1	2
Pat Boutette	C/RW	80	18	18	36	107	13	3	0	1
Bob Neely	LW	70	17	16	33	16	−17	3	0	5
Stan Weir	C	65	11	19	30	14	2	1	0	2
Scott Garland	C	69	9	20	29	83	−18	3	0	1
George Ferguson	C	50	9	15	24	24	0	0	2	0
Claire Alexander	D	48	1	12	13	12	−4	0	0	0
Brian Glennie	D	69	1	10	11	73	−1	0	0	0
Bruce Boudreau	C	15	2	5	7	4	2	0	0	1
Kurt Walker	D	26	2	3	5	24	5	0	0	0
Randy Carlyle	D	45	0	5	5	51	−19	0	0	0
Paul Evans	C/LW	7	1	1	2	19	3	0	0	0
Bob Warner	D	10	1	1	2	4	4	0	0	0
Mike Palmateer	G	50	0	2	2	8	0	0	0	0
Mike Pelyk	D	13	0	2	2	4	−4	0	0	0
Tracy Pratt	D	11	0	1	1	8	−7	0	0	0
Wayne Thomas	G	33	0	1	1	4	0	0	0	0
Blair MacKasey	D	1	0	0	0	2				
Gord McRae	G	2	0	0	0	0	0	0	0	0

Goaltending

Player	MIN	GP	W	L	T	GA	GAA	SO
Mike Palmateer	2877	50	23	18	8	154	3.21	4
Wayne Thomas	1803	33	10	13	6	116	3.86	1
Gord McRae	120	2	0	1	1	9	4.50	0
Team:	4800	80	33	32	15	279	3.49	5

=== Playoffs ===
Scoring

Player	Pos	GP	G	A	Pts	PIM	PPG	SHG	GWG
Darryl Sittler	C	9	5	16	21	4	3	0	0
Lanny McDonald	RW	9	10	7	17	6	3	0	1
Borje Salming	D	9	3	6	9	6	2	0	0
Tiger Williams	LW	9	3	6	9	29	0	0	1
Ian Turnbull	D	9	4	4	8	10	4	0	0
Bob Neely	LW	9	1	3	4	6	1	0	0
Pat Boutette	C/RW	9	0	4	4	17	0	0	0
Stan Weir	C	7	2	1	3	0	1	0	1
George Ferguson	C	9	0	3	3	7	0	0	0
Errol Thompson	LW	9	2	0	2	0	0	0	1
Jim McKenny	D	9	0	2	2	2	0	0	0
Mike Pelyk	D	9	0	2	2	4	0	0	0
Don Ashby	C	9	1	0	1	4	0	0	0
Randy Carlyle	D	9	0	1	1	20	0	0	0
Bruce Boudreau	C	3	0	0	0	0	0	0	0
Paul Evans	C/LW	2	0	0	0	0	0	0	0
Brian Glennie	D	2	0	0	0	0	0	0	0
Inge Hammarstrom	LW	2	0	0	0	0	0	0	0
Mike Palmateer	G	6	0	0	0	0	0	0	0
Tracy Pratt	D	4	0	0	0	0	0	0	0
Wayne Thomas	G	4	0	0	0	0	0	0	0
Bob Warner	D	2	0	0	0	0	0	0	0

Goaltending

Player	MIN	GP	W	L	GA	GAA	SO
Mike Palmateer	360	6	3	3	16	2.67	0
Wayne Thomas	202	4	1	2	12	3.56	0
Team:	562	9	4	5	28	2.99	0

Note:

Pos = Position;GP = Games played; G = Goals; A = Assists; Pts = Points; PIM = Penalty minutes; +/- = Plus/minus; PPG = Power-play goals; SHG = Short-handed goals; GWG = Game-winning goals
Pos = Position;GP = Games played; Min, TOI = Minutes played; W = Wins; L = Losses; T,T/OT = Ties; OTL = Overtime losses; GA = Goals-against; GAA = Goals-against average; SO = Shutouts; SA = Shots against; SV = Shots saved;SV% = Save percentage;

== Awards and records ==
- Lanny McDonald, Right Wing, NHL Second All-Star Team
- Borje Salming, Defence, NHL First All-Star Team

== Transactions ==
The Maple Leafs have been involved in the following transactions during the 1976–77 season.

=== Trades ===
September 9, 1976	To St. Louis Blues FA Signing of Rod Seiling	To Toronto Maple Leafs 2nd round pick in 1978 – Joel Quenneville; Cash
September 15, 1976	To Colorado Rockies Doug Favell	To Toronto Maple Leafs Cash
September 27, 1976	To Washington Capitals Cash	To Toronto Maple Leafs Blair MacKasey
September 28, 1976	To Chicago Black Hawks Jim Harrison	To Toronto Maple Leafs 2nd round pick in 1977 – Bob Gladney
March 8, 1977	To Colorado Rockies 3rd round pick in 1977 – Randy Pierce	To Toronto Maple Leafs Tracy Pratt

=== Free agents ===
Player	New Team
Rod Seiling	St. Louis Blues
Tom Cassidy	Boston Bruins

== Draft picks ==
Toronto's draft picks at the 1976 NHL amateur draft held in Montreal.

Round	#	Player	Nationality	College/Junior/Club team (League)
2	30	Randy Carlyle	Canada	Sudbury Wolves (OMJHL)
3	48	Alain Belanger	Canada	Sherbrooke Castors (QMJHL)
3	52	Gary McFayden	Canada	Hull Festivals (QMJHL)
4	66	Tim Williams	Canada	Victoria Cougars (WCHL)
5	84	Greg Hotham	Canada	Kingston Canadians (OMJHL)
6	102	Dan Djakalovic	Canada	Kitchener Rangers (OMJHL)
7	116	Charlie Skjodt	Canada	Windsor Spitfires (OMJHL)
