= 1976–77 Pittsburgh Penguins season =

NHL team season

1976–77 Pittsburgh Penguins
- Division: 3rd Norris
- Conference: 5th Wales
- 1976–77 record: 34–33–13
- Home record: 22–12–6
- Road record: 12–21–7
- Goals for: 240
- Goals against: 252

Team information
- General manager: Wren Blair (Oct–Dec); Baz Bastien (Dec–Apr)
- Coach: Ken Schinkel
- Captain: Ron Schock
- Alternate captains: None
- Arena: Pittsburgh Civic Arena

Team leaders
- Goals: Jean Pronovost (33)
- Assists: Syl Apps Jr. (43)
- Points: Jean Pronovost (64)
- Penalty minutes: Bob Kelly (115)
- Wins: Dunc Wilson (18)
- Goals against average: Denis Herron (2.94)

The 1976–77 Pittsburgh Penguins season was their tenth in the National Hockey League (NHL). They finished third in the Norris Division for the third season in a row. In the playoffs, the Penguins were eliminated in the first round. Changes occurred in management and ownership. In December 1976, Baz Bastien replaced Wren Blair as the club's general manager. The club was sold to shopping mall magnate Edward J. DeBartolo Sr. in February 1977.

== Regular season ==
Despite the fact that Pierre Larouche, Jean Pronovost and Syl Apps were unable to reproduce their franchise record-setting offensive output of the previous season the team finished with a similar regular season record on the strength of improved defensive prowess and the goaltending of Dunc Wilson and Denis Herron, who was re-acquired from the Kansas City Scouts in the off-season.

General Manager Wren Blair, who had been part of the ownership group which bought the club from the NHL in July 1975 until February 1976, was removed from his position December 3, 1976. Aldege 'Baz' Bastien, the man who had coached the American Hockey League's Pittsburgh Hornets to a Calder Cup championship in 1967, was named Blair's replacement.

Co-owners Al Savill and Otto Frenzel sold the club to shopping mall magnate Edward J. DeBartolo Sr. in February 1977, less than two years after having bought the team from the NHL.

=== Final standings ===
Norris Division
	GP	W	L	T	GF	GA	Pts
**Montreal Canadiens**	80	60	8	12	387	171	132
**Los Angeles Kings**	80	34	31	15	271	241	83
**Pittsburgh Penguins**	80	34	33	13	240	252	81
Washington Capitals	80	24	42	14	221	307	62
Detroit Red Wings	80	16	55	9	183	309	41

Note: GP = Games played, W = Wins, L = Losses, T = Ties, Pts = Points, GF = Goals for, GA = Goals against
Note: Teams that qualified for the playoffs are highlighted in bold.

=== Record vs. opponents ===
Norris Division record vs. opponents

**Vs. Wales Conference**

**Vs. Campbell Conference**

**Vs. Norris Division**

1976–77 NHL records
Team	**DET**	**LAK**	**MTL**	**PIT**	**WSH**	**Total**
Detroit	—	0–5–1	0–5–1	2–4	0–3–3	**2–17–5**
Los Angeles	5–0–1	—	0–4–2	3–2–1	5–0–1	**13–6–5**
Montreal	5–0–1	4–0–2	—	4–0–2	6–0	**19–0–5**
Pittsburgh	4–2	2–3–1	0–4–2	—	1–4–1	**7–13–4**
Washington	3–0–3	0–5–1	0–6	4–1–1	—	**7–12–5**

**Vs. Adams Division**

1976–77 NHL records
Team	**BOS**	**BUF**	**CLE**	**TOR**	**Total**
Detroit	1–4	1–4	3–2	1–3–1	**6–13–1**
Los Angeles	2–2–1	2–3	2–1–2	1–2–2	**7–8–5**
Montreal	2–3	2–2–1	5–0	2–1–1	**11–6–2**
Pittsburgh	1–3–1	4–0–1	3–0–2	2–1–2	**10–4–6**
Washington	0–4–1	1–4	0–5	3–2	**4–15–1**

**Vs. Patrick Division**

1976–77 NHL records
Team	**ATL**	**NYI**	**NYR**	**PHI**	**Total**
Detroit	1–2–1	2–2	1–3	1–3	**5–10–1**
Los Angeles	2–2	2–2	3–0–1	0–4	**7–8–1**
Montreal	3–0–1	4–0	3–1	4–0	**14–1–1**
Pittsburgh	0–3–1	2–2	2–1–1	1–3	**5–9–2**
Washington	1–3	0–1–3	2–2	0–2–2	**3–8–5**

**Vs. Smythe Division**

1976–77 NHL records
Team	**CHI**	**COL**	**MIN**	**STL**	**VAN**	**Total**
Detroit	0–4	0–4	0–3–1	0–3–1	3–1	**3–15–2**
Los Angeles	2–2	2–0–2	1–3	2–2	0–2–2	**7–9–4**
Montreal	3–0–1	3–0–1	3–0–1	3–1	4–0	**16–1–3**
Pittsburgh	2–2	2–2	3–1	3–1	2–1–1	**12–7–1**
Washington	1–2–1	3–1	1–1–2	3–1	2–2	**10–7–3**

== Schedule and results ==
1976–77 regular season
October: 2–6–4 (home: 2–2–2; road: 0–4–2), 8 points

#	Date	Visitor	Score	Home	Location	Record	Points
1	Oct 6	Vancouver Canucks	5–9	Pittsburgh Penguins	Civic Arena	1–0–0	2
2	Oct 7	Pittsburgh Penguins	1–10	Montreal Canadiens	Montreal Forum	1–1–0	2
3	Oct 9	Los Angeles Kings	7–4	Pittsburgh Penguins	Civic Arena	1–2–0	2
4	Oct 13	Pittsburgh Penguins	1–4	Chicago Black Hawks	Chicago Stadium	1–3–0	2
5	Oct 15	Pittsburgh Penguins	1–2	Atlanta Flames	Omni Coliseum	1–4–0	2
6	Oct 16	Detroit Red Wings	3–4	Pittsburgh Penguins	Civic Arena	2–4–0	4
7	Oct 20	Pittsburgh Penguins	4–4	Toronto Maple Leafs	Maple Leaf Gardens	2–4–1	5
8	Oct 23	Montreal Canadiens	9–1	Pittsburgh Penguins	Civic Arena	2–5–1	5
9	Oct 24	Atlanta Flames	3–3	Pittsburgh Penguins	Civic Arena	2–5–2	6
10	Oct 27	Pittsburgh Penguins	4–4	Buffalo Sabres	Buffalo Memorial Auditorium	2–5–3	7
11	Oct 28	Pittsburgh Penguins	0–3	Philadelphia Flyers	The Spectrum	2–6–3	7
12	Oct 30	New York Rangers	2–2	Pittsburgh Penguins	Civic Arena	2–6–4	8

November: 6–5–1 (home: 3–3–0; road: 3–2–1), 13 points

#	Date	Visitor	Score	Home	Location	Record	Points
13	Nov 2	Los Angeles Kings	1–7	Pittsburgh Penguins	Civic Arena	3–6–4	10
14	Nov 5	Pittsburgh Penguins	4–1	Colorado Rockies	McNichols Sports Arena	4–6–4	12
15	Nov 7	Pittsburgh Penguins	2–2	Cleveland Barons	Coliseum at Richfield	4–6–5	13
16	Nov 10	Pittsburgh Penguins	2–3	Minnesota North Stars	Met Center	4–7–5	13
17	Nov 13	Philadelphia Flyers	0–1	Pittsburgh Penguins	Civic Arena	5–7–5	15
18	Nov 14	Pittsburgh Penguins	5–1	New York Rangers	Madison Square Garden (IV)	6–7–5	17
19	Nov 20	Colorado Rockies	5–2	Pittsburgh Penguins	Civic Arena	6–8–5	17
20	Nov 21	Chicago Black Hawks	0–5	Pittsburgh Penguins	Civic Arena	7–8–5	19
21	Nov 24	Boston Bruins	4–0	Pittsburgh Penguins	Civic Arena	7–9–5	19
22	Nov 26	Pittsburgh Penguins	3–1	Cleveland Barons	Coliseum at Richfield	8–9–5	21
23	Nov 27	New York Islanders	3–1	Pittsburgh Penguins	Civic Arena	8–10–5	21
24	Nov 30	Pittsburgh Penguins	4–6	Washington Capitals	Capital Centre	8–11–5	21

December: 7–5–1 (home: 4–1–1; road: 3–4–0), 15 points

#	Date	Visitor	Score	Home	Location	Record	Points
25	Dec 2	Pittsburgh Penguins	4–2	New York Islanders	Nassau Veterans Memorial Coliseum	9–11–5	23
26	Dec 4	Pittsburgh Penguins	1–3	Montreal Canadiens	Montreal Forum	9–12–5	23
27	Dec 7	Minnesota North Stars	2–6	Pittsburgh Penguins	Civic Arena	10–12–5	25
28	Dec 9	Pittsburgh Penguins	2–1	Buffalo Sabres	Buffalo Memorial Auditorium	11–12–5	27
29	Dec 11	Pittsburgh Penguins	3–6	New York Islanders	Nassau Veterans Memorial Coliseum	11–13–5	27
30	Dec 12	St. Louis Blues	3–5	Pittsburgh Penguins	Civic Arena	12–13–5	29
31	Dec 16	Cleveland Barons	4–5	Pittsburgh Penguins	Civic Arena	13–13–5	31
32	Dec 18	Washington Capitals	5–3	Pittsburgh Penguins	Civic Arena	13–14–5	31
33	Dec 19	Pittsburgh Penguins	3–6	Boston Bruins	Boston Garden	13–15–5	31
34	Dec 22	Pittsburgh Penguins	5–2	Toronto Maple Leafs	Maple Leaf Gardens	14–15–5	33
35	Dec 23	Pittsburgh Penguins	2–5	Detroit Red Wings	Olympia Stadium	14–16–5	33
36	Dec 26	Toronto Maple Leafs	2–4	Pittsburgh Penguins	Civic Arena	15–16–5	35
37	Dec 29	Montreal Canadiens	3–3	Pittsburgh Penguins	Civic Arena	15–16–6	36

January: 7–4–2 (home: 5–3–1; road: 2–1–1), 16 points

#	Date	Visitor	Score	Home	Location	Record	Points
38	Jan 1	Buffalo Sabres	3–6	Pittsburgh Penguins	Civic Arena	16–16–6	38
39	Jan 4	Vancouver Canucks	2–2	Pittsburgh Penguins	Civic Arena	16–16–7	39
40	Jan 6	Pittsburgh Penguins	3–3	Washington Capitals	Capital Centre	16–16–8	40
41	Jan 8	Chicago Black Hawks	2–4	Pittsburgh Penguins	Civic Arena	17–16–8	42
42	Jan 11	Toronto Maple Leafs	2–0	Pittsburgh Penguins	Civic Arena	17–17–8	42
43	Jan 15	Buffalo Sabres	2–5	Pittsburgh Penguins	Civic Arena	18–17–8	44
44	Jan 16	Atlanta Flames	6–5	Pittsburgh Penguins	Civic Arena	18–18–8	44
45	Jan 19	Pittsburgh Penguins	3–0	Vancouver Canucks	Pacific Coliseum	19–18–8	46
46	Jan 20	Pittsburgh Penguins	3–5	Los Angeles Kings	The Forum	19–19–8	46
47	Jan 22	New York Islanders	2–3	Pittsburgh Penguins	Civic Arena	20–19–8	48
48	Jan 27	Pittsburgh Penguins	3–0	New York Rangers	Madison Square Garden (IV)	21–19–8	50
49	Jan 29	Philadelphia Flyers	5–2	Pittsburgh Penguins	Civic Arena	21–20–8	50
50	Jan 30	Boston Bruins	2–5	Pittsburgh Penguins	Civic Arena	22–20–8	52

February: 5–5–4 (home: 4–0–2; road: 1–5–2), 14 points

#	Date	Visitor	Score	Home	Location	Record	Points
51	Feb 2	Minnesota North Stars	2–5	Pittsburgh Penguins	Civic Arena	23–20–8	54
52	Feb 3	Pittsburgh Penguins	0–0	Cleveland Barons	Coliseum at Richfield	23–20–9	55
53	Feb 5	Detroit Red Wings	1–3	Pittsburgh Penguins	Civic Arena	24–20–9	57
54	Feb 6	Pittsburgh Penguins	2–5	Colorado Rockies	McNichols Sports Arena	24–21–9	57
55	Feb 8	Pittsburgh Penguins	3–6	St. Louis Blues	St. Louis Arena	24–22–9	57
56	Feb 11	Pittsburgh Penguins	2–3	Vancouver Canucks	Pacific Coliseum	24–23–9	57
57	Feb 12	Pittsburgh Penguins	3–2	Los Angeles Kings	The Forum	25–23–9	59
58	Feb 16	Montreal Canadiens	4–4	Pittsburgh Penguins	Civic Arena	25–23–10	60
59	Feb 19	Pittsburgh Penguins	6–6	Toronto Maple Leafs	Maple Leaf Gardens	25–23–11	61
60	Feb 20	Cleveland Barons	1–4	Pittsburgh Penguins	Civic Arena	26–23–11	63
61	Feb 22	Pittsburgh Penguins	1–3	Washington Capitals	Capital Centre	26–24–11	63
62	Feb 24	Pittsburgh Penguins	2–3	Detroit Red Wings	Olympia Stadium	26–25–11	63
63	Feb 26	Washington Capitals	1–2	Pittsburgh Penguins	Civic Arena	27–25–11	65
64	Feb 27	Boston Bruins	2–2	Pittsburgh Penguins	Civic Arena	27–25–12	66

March: 5–8–1 (home: 3–3–0; road: 2–5–1), 11 points

#	Date	Visitor	Score	Home	Location	Record	Points
65	Mar 2	Los Angeles Kings	5–0	Pittsburgh Penguins	Civic Arena	27–26–12	66
66	Mar 3	Pittsburgh Penguins	1–5	Montreal Canadiens	Montreal Forum	27–27–12	66
67	Mar 5	Pittsburgh Penguins	3–3	Los Angeles Kings	The Forum	27–27–13	67
68	Mar 8	Pittsburgh Penguins	2–1	St. Louis Blues	St. Louis Arena	28–27–13	69
69	Mar 9	Colorado Rockies	0–3	Pittsburgh Penguins	Civic Arena	29–27–13	71
70	Mar 12	Buffalo Sabres	2–3	Pittsburgh Penguins	Civic Arena	30–27–13	73
71	Mar 13	Pittsburgh Penguins	0–4	Philadelphia Flyers	The Spectrum	30–28–13	73
72	Mar 15	Pittsburgh Penguins	3–7	Atlanta Flames	Omni Coliseum	30–29–13	73
73	Mar 16	St. Louis Blues	3–7	Pittsburgh Penguins	Civic Arena	31–29–13	75
74	Mar 19	New York Rangers	5–2	Pittsburgh Penguins	Civic Arena	31–30–13	75
75	Mar 20	Pittsburgh Penguins	2–3	Chicago Black Hawks	Chicago Stadium	31–31–13	75
76	Mar 22	Pittsburgh Penguins	4–2	Minnesota North Stars	Met Center	32–31–13	77
77	Mar 27	Pittsburgh Penguins	0–3	Boston Bruins	Boston Garden	32–32–13	77
78	Mar 30	Washington Capitals	4–3	Pittsburgh Penguins	Civic Arena	32–33–13	77

April: 2–0–0 (home: 1–0–0; road: 1–0–0), 4 points

#	Date	Visitor	Score	Home	Location	Record	Points
79	Apr 2	Pittsburgh Penguins	4–3	Detroit Red Wings	Olympia Stadium	33–33–13	79
80	Apr 3	Detroit Red Wings	2–4	Pittsburgh Penguins	Civic Arena	34–33–13	81

Legend: Win (2 points) Loss (0 points) Tie (1 point)

== Playoffs ==
The Penguins' opponent in the first round of the Stanley Cup playoffs was once again the Toronto Maple Leafs. While the Penguins' offensive output greatly improved to ten goals scored (compared to 1976's three goals), the Maple Leafs once again dispatched the Penguins in three games.

April 5	Toronto Maple Leafs	4–2	Pittsburgh Penguins	Civic Arena	Recap
No scoring		First period	13:25 – Bob Kelly (1)
Don Ashby (1) – 04:12; Lanny McDonald (1) – 12:11		Second period	No scoring
Dave Williams (1) – 10:32; Darryl Sittler (1) – en – 19:52		Third period	18:34 – pp – Mario Faubert (1)
Wayne Thomas 29 saves / 31 shots		Goalie stats	Denis Herron 29 saves / 32 shots

April 7	Pittsburgh Penguins	6–4	Toronto Maple Leafs	Maple Leaf Gardens	Recap
Jean Pronovost (1) – 01:01; Ron Stackhouse (1) – 06:37; Syl Apps Jr. (1) – pp – 12:30		First period	No scoring
Lowell MacDonald (1) – 07:38		Second period	06:10 – pp – Darryl Sittler (2); 12:38 – Stan Weir (1)
Greg Malone (1) – 13:57; Ron Stackhouse (2) – en – 19:23		Third period	03:37 – pp – Ian Turnbull (1); 07:52 – Borje Salming (1)
Denis Herron 37 saves / 41 shots		Goalie stats	Wayne Thomas 28 saves / 33 shots

April 9	Toronto Maple Leafs	5–2	Pittsburgh Penguins	Civic Arena	Recap
Borje Salming (2) – pp – 08:34; Ian Turnbull (2) – pp – 14:14		First period	19:40 – pp – Jean Pronovost (2)
Lanny McDonald (2) – 08:46; Lanny McDonald (3) – 14:17		Second period	16:06 – Blair Chapman (1)
Lanny McDonald (4) – en – 19:44		Third period	No scoring
Mike Palmateer 38 saves / 40 shots		Goalie stats	Denis Herron 37 saves / 41 shots

Toronto won series 2–1

== Player statistics ==
Skaters

Regular season
Player	GP	G	A	Pts	+/−	PIM
Jean Pronovost	79	33	31	64	8	24
Pierre Larouche	65	29	34	63	–10	14
Syl Apps Jr.	72	18	43	61	2	20
Rick Kehoe	80	30	27	57	–5	10
Ron Schock	80	17	32	49	–6	10
Ron Stackhouse	80	7	34	41	11	72
Mike Corrigan	73	14	27	41	–13	36
Greg Malone	66	18	19	37	3	43
Blair Chapman	80	14	23	37	–12	16
Wayne Bianchin	79	28	6	34	–1	28
J. Bob Kelly	74	10	21	31	13	115
Dennis Owchar	46	5	18	23	–7	37
Stan Gilbertson	67	6	9	15	–9	13
Mario Faubert	47	2	11	13	–4	32
Don Awrey	79	1	12	13	–2	40
Russ Anderson	66	2	11	13	5	81
Dave Burrows	69	3	6	9	–15	29
Ed Van Impe	10	0	3	3	–2	6
Lew Morrison	76	2	1	3	–6	0
Lowell MacDonald	3	1	1	2	–1	0
Vic Hadfield	9	0	2	2	1	0
Thomas Price^{†}	7	0	2	2	0	4
Ed Gilbert	7	0	0	0	–3	0
Yves Bergeron	1	0	0	0	0	0
Steve Lyon	3	0	0	0	0	2
Total		240	373	613	—	632

Playoffs
Player	GP	G	A	Pts	+/−	PIM
Jean Pronovost	3	2	1	3	0	2
Lowell MacDonald	3	1	2	3	0	4
Ron Stackhouse	3	2	1	3	0	0
Pierre Larouche	3	0	3	3	0	0
Blair Chapman	3	1	1	2	0	7
Rick Kehoe	3	0	2	2	0	0
Dave Burrows	3	0	2	2	0	0
Greg Malone	3	1	1	2	0	2
Don Awrey	3	0	1	1	0	0
Wayne Bianchin	3	0	1	1	0	6
Russ Anderson	3	0	1	1	0	14
Mario Faubert	3	1	0	1	0	2
John Kelly	3	1	0	1	0	4
Ron Schock	3	0	1	1	0	0
Syl Apps Jr.	3	1	0	1	0	12
Lew Morrison	1	0	0	0	0	0
Mike Corrigan	2	0	0	0	0	0
Total		10	17	27	—	53

Goaltenders

Regular Season
Player	GP	W	L	T	GA	SO
Dunc Wilson	45	18	19	8	129	5
Denis Herron	34	15	11	5	94	1
Gordon Laxton	6	1	3	0	26	0
Total		34	33	13	249	6

Playoffs
Player	GP	W	L	T	GA	SO
Denis Herron	3	1	2	0	11	0
Total		1	2	0	11	0

^{†}Denotes player spent time with another team before joining the Penguins. Stats reflect time with the Penguins only.
^{‡}Denotes player was traded mid-season. Stats reflect time with the Penguins only.

== Awards and records ==
- Jean Pronovost became the first player to score 500 points for the Penguins. He did so in a 3–6 loss to New York on December 11.

== Transactions ==
The Penguins were involved in the following transactions during the 1976–77 season:

=== Trades ===
August 11, 1976	To Montreal Canadiens 1978 3rd round pick (Richard David) future considerations	To Pittsburgh Penguins Don Awrey
October 8, 1976	To New York Rangers 1978 4th round pick (Dave Silk)	To Pittsburgh Penguins Dunc Wilson
October 18, 1976	To Los Angeles Kings 1977 5th round pick (Julian Baretta)	To Pittsburgh Penguins Mike Corrigan

=== Additions and subtractions ===
Additions
Player	Former team	Via
Denis Herron	Kansas City Scouts	free agency (1976-08-07)
Steve Lyon	Minnesota North Stars	free agency (1976–11)
Tom Price	Cleveland Barons	free agency (1977-02-28)

Subtractions
Player	New team	Via
Barry Wilkins	Edmonton Oilers (WHA)	free agency
Pete Laframboise	Edmonton Oilers (WHA)	free agency (1976-05)
Simon Nolet	Colorado Rockies	compensation for signing of Denis Herron (1976-08-07)
Michel Plasse	Colorado Rockies	compensation for signing of Denis Herron (1976-08-07)
Colin Campbell^{†}	Colorado Rockies	compensation for signing of Denis Herron (1976-09-01)

^{†}Colin Campbell was loaned to the Rockies for one season. He was returned to the Penguins in 1977.

== Draft picks ==
The 1976 NHL amateur draft was held on June 1, 1976, in Montreal.

Round	#	Player	Pos	Nationality	College/Junior/Club team (League)
1	2	Blair Chapman	Right wing	Canada	Saskatoon Blades (WCHL)
2	19	Greg Malone	Center	Canada	Oshawa Generals (OHA)
2	29	Peter Marsh	Right wing	Canada	Sherbrooke Beavers (QMJHL)
3	47	Morris Lukowich	Left wing	Canada	Medicine Hat Tigers (WCHL)
4	65	Greg Redquest	Goaltender	Canada	Oshawa Generals (OHA)
5	83	Brendan Lowe	Defense	Canada	Sherbrooke Beavers (QMJHL)
6	101	Vic Sirko	Defense	Canada	Oshawa Generals (OHA)
