= 1976–77 Detroit Red Wings season =

National Hockey League team season

1976–77 Detroit Red Wings
- Division: 5th Norris
- Conference: 9th Wales
- 1976–77 record: 16–55–9
- Home record: 12–22–6
- Road record: 4–33–3
- Goals for: 183
- Goals against: 309

Team information
- General manager: Alex Delvecchio (Oct–Mar); Ted Lindsay (Mar–Apr)
- Coach: Alex Delvecchio, Larry Wilson
- Captain: Danny Grant; Dennis Polonich
- Alternate captains: None
- Arena: Detroit Olympia

Team leaders
- Goals: Walt McKechnie (25)
- Assists: Walt McKechnie (34)
- Points: Walt McKechnie (59)
- Penalty minutes: Dennis Polonich (277)
- Wins: Ed Giacomin (8)
- Goals against average: Ed Giacomin (3.58)

The 1976–77 Detroit Red Wings season was the 51st season for the Detroit franchise, 45th as the Red Wings. The Red Wings failed to qualify to the playoffs for the seventh straight year for the first time in franchise history and for the first time since the 1958–59 season they finished last in the league.

== Regular season ==
=== Final standings ===
Norris Division
	GP	W	L	T	GF	GA	Pts
**Montreal Canadiens**	80	60	8	12	387	171	132
**Los Angeles Kings**	80	34	31	15	271	241	83
**Pittsburgh Penguins**	80	34	33	13	240	252	81
Washington Capitals	80	24	42	14	221	307	62
Detroit Red Wings	80	16	55	9	183	309	41

Note: GP = Games played, W = Wins, L = Losses, T = Ties, Pts = Points, GF = Goals for, GA = Goals against
Note: Teams that qualified for the playoffs are highlighted in bold.

=== Record vs. opponents ===
Norris Division record vs. opponents

**Vs. Wales Conference**

**Vs. Campbell Conference**

**Vs. Norris Division**

1976–77 NHL records
Team	**DET**	**LAK**	**MTL**	**PIT**	**WSH**	**Total**
Detroit	—	0–5–1	0–5–1	2–4	0–3–3	**2–17–5**
Los Angeles	5–0–1	—	0–4–2	3–2–1	5–0–1	**13–6–5**
Montreal	5–0–1	4–0–2	—	4–0–2	6–0	**19–0–5**
Pittsburgh	4–2	2–3–1	0–4–2	—	1–4–1	**7–13–4**
Washington	3–0–3	0–5–1	0–6	4–1–1	—	**7–12–5**

**Vs. Adams Division**

1976–77 NHL records
Team	**BOS**	**BUF**	**CLE**	**TOR**	**Total**
Detroit	1–4	1–4	3–2	1–3–1	**6–13–1**
Los Angeles	2–2–1	2–3	2–1–2	1–2–2	**7–8–5**
Montreal	2–3	2–2–1	5–0	2–1–1	**11–6–2**
Pittsburgh	1–3–1	4–0–1	3–0–2	2–1–2	**10–4–6**
Washington	0–4–1	1–4	0–5	3–2	**4–15–1**

**Vs. Patrick Division**

1976–77 NHL records
Team	**ATL**	**NYI**	**NYR**	**PHI**	**Total**
Detroit	1–2–1	2–2	1–3	1–3	**5–10–1**
Los Angeles	2–2	2–2	3–0–1	0–4	**7–8–1**
Montreal	3–0–1	4–0	3–1	4–0	**14–1–1**
Pittsburgh	0–3–1	2–2	2–1–1	1–3	**5–9–2**
Washington	1–3	0–1–3	2–2	0–2–2	**3–8–5**

**Vs. Smythe Division**

1976–77 NHL records
Team	**CHI**	**COL**	**MIN**	**STL**	**VAN**	**Total**
Detroit	0–4	0–4	0–3–1	0–3–1	3–1	**3–15–2**
Los Angeles	2–2	2–0–2	1–3	2–2	0–2–2	**7–9–4**
Montreal	3–0–1	3–0–1	3–0–1	3–1	4–0	**16–1–3**
Pittsburgh	2–2	2–2	3–1	3–1	2–1–1	**12–7–1**
Washington	1–2–1	3–1	1–1–2	3–1	2–2	**10–7–3**

== Schedule and results ==
1976–77 regular season
October

Game	Result	Date	Score	Opponent	Record
1	T	October 7, 1976	3–3	Washington Capitals (1976–77)	0–0–1
2	W	October 9, 1976	4–0	Buffalo Sabres (1976–77)	1–0–1
3	L	October 12, 1976	2–4	Montreal Canadiens (1976–77)	1–1–1
4	L	October 16, 1976	3–4	@ Pittsburgh Penguins (1976–77)	1–2–1
5	L	October 17, 1976	4–7	@ Philadelphia Flyers (1976–77)	1–3–1
6	W	October 22, 1976	5–0	New York Islanders (1976–77)	2–3–1
7	L	October 23, 1976	2–4	@ St. Louis Blues (1976–77)	2–4–1
8	L	October 26, 1976	2–3	@ Los Angeles Kings (1976–77)	2–5–1
9	L	October 28, 1976	1–3	Toronto Maple Leafs (1976–77)	2–6–1
10	L	October 30, 1976	1–4	Chicago Black Hawks (1976–77)	2–7–1
11	W	October 31, 1976	6–5	@ New York Rangers (1976–77)	3–7–1

November

Game	Result	Date	Score	Opponent	Record
12	W	November 4, 1976	3–2	Philadelphia Flyers (1976–77)	4–7–1
13	T	November 7, 1976	0–0	Atlanta Flames (1976–77)	4–7–2
14	L	November 9, 1976	1–8	@ New York Islanders (1976–77)	4–8–2
15	L	November 10, 1976	4–6	Boston Bruins (1976–77)	4–9–2
16	T	November 13, 1976	3–3	Los Angeles Kings (1976–77)	4–9–3
17	L	November 16, 1976	0–2	@ Philadelphia Flyers (1976–77)	4–10–3
18	T	November 17, 1976	5–5	St. Louis Blues (1976–77)	4–10–4
19	W	November 19, 1976	5–2	Cleveland Barons (1976–77)	5–10–4
20	L	November 21, 1976	2–4	@ Boston Bruins (1976–77)	5–11–4
21	W	November 24, 1976	4–3	Toronto Maple Leafs (1976–77)	6–11–4
22	W	November 25, 1976	3–1	@ New York Islanders (1976–77)	7–11–4
23	L	November 27, 1976	0–5	New York Rangers (1976–77)	7–12–4
24	L	November 28, 1976	1–3	@ Buffalo Sabres (1976–77)	7–13–4

December

Game	Result	Date	Score	Opponent	Record
25	W	December 1, 1976	5–2	@ Vancouver Canucks (1976–77)	8–13–4
26	L	December 4, 1976	1–4	@ Los Angeles Kings (1976–77)	8–14–4
27	L	December 11, 1976	0–5	@ Montreal Canadiens (1976–77)	8–15–4
28	W	December 12, 1976	5–3	@ Boston Bruins (1976–77)	9–15–4
29	L	December 15, 1976	3–7	@ Cleveland Barons (1976–77)	9–16–4
30	W	December 16, 1976	7–3	Vancouver Canucks (1976–77)	10–16–4
31	W	December 18, 1976	6–3	Atlanta Flames (1976–77)	11–16–4
32	L	December 19, 1976	1–6	@ Buffalo Sabres (1976–77)	11–17–4
33	L	December 22, 1976	1–2	@ Atlanta Flames (1976–77)	11–18–4
34	W	December 23, 1976	5–2	Pittsburgh Penguins (1976–77)	12–18–4
35	L	December 27, 1976	4–7	Los Angeles Kings (1976–77)	12–19–4
36	L	December 29, 1976	3–6	@ Chicago Black Hawks (1976–77)	12–20–4
37	W	December 31, 1976	4–2	Cleveland Barons (1976–77)	13–20–4

January

Game	Result	Date	Score	Opponent	Record
38	L	January 2, 1977	4–6	Colorado Rockies (1976–77)	13–21–4
39	T	January 4, 1977	2–2	@ Washington Capitals (1976–77)	13–21–5
40	L	January 6, 1977	2–7	Minnesota North Stars (1976–77)	13–22–5
41	L	January 10, 1977	0–2	Washington Capitals (1976–77)	13–23–5
42	L	January 12, 1977	1–3	@ Cleveland Barons (1976–77)	13–24–5
43	L	January 13, 1977	2–4	@ Colorado Rockies (1976–77)	13–25–5
44	L	January 15, 1977	0–4	@ St. Louis Blues (1976–77)	13–26–5
45	L	January 20, 1977	1–3	Colorado Rockies (1976–77)	13–27–5
46	L	January 22, 1977	0–3	Chicago Black Hawks (1976–77)	13–28–5
47	T	January 23, 1977	2–2	@ Montreal Canadiens (1976–77)	13–28–6
48	L	January 27, 1977	1–4	@ Washington Capitals (1976–77)	13–29–6
49	W	January 29, 1977	4–3	Cleveland Barons (1976–77)	14–29–6

February

Game	Result	Date	Score	Opponent	Record
50	L	February 2, 1977	1–9	@ Toronto Maple Leafs (1976–77)	14–30–6
51	L	February 5, 1977	1–3	@ Pittsburgh Penguins (1976–77)	14–31–6
52	W	February 6, 1977	3–2	Vancouver Canucks (1976–77)	15–31–6
53	L	February 10, 1977	4–5	New York Rangers (1976–77)	15–32–6
54	T	February 12, 1977	2–2	@ Minnesota North Stars (1976–77)	15–32–7
55	L	February 13, 1977	3–5	Montreal Canadiens (1976–77)	15–33–7
56	L	February 15, 1977	2–6	@ Colorado Rockies (1976–77)	15–34–7
57	T	February 17, 1977	2–2	Toronto Maple Leafs (1976–77)	15–34–8
58	L	February 19, 1977	1–2	Buffalo Sabres (1976–77)	15–35–8
59	L	February 20, 1977	2–3	@ New York Rangers (1976–77)	15–36–8
60	L	February 23, 1977	2–5	@ Chicago Black Hawks (1976–77)	15–37–8
61	W	February 24, 1977	3–2	Pittsburgh Penguins (1976–77)	16–37–8
62	L	February 26, 1977	3–4	Los Angeles Kings (1976–77)	16–38–8

March

Game	Result	Date	Score	Opponent	Record
63	L	March 1, 1977	3–8	@ Boston Bruins (1976–77)	16–39–8
64	L	March 3, 1977	2–4	New York Islanders (1976–77)	16–40–8
65	L	March 5, 1977	1–4	Philadelphia Flyers (1976–77)	16–41–8
66	L	March 9, 1977	3–6	@ Buffalo Sabres (1976–77)	16–42–8
67	L	March 10, 1977	2–4	St. Louis Blues (1976–77)	16–43–8
68	L	March 12, 1977	0–6	@ Toronto Maple Leafs (1976–77)	16–44–8
69	T	March 13, 1977	3–3	Washington Capitals (1976–77)	16–44–9
70	L	March 15, 1977	1–7	@ Vancouver Canucks (1976–77)	16–45–9
71	L	March 17, 1977	2–3	@ Los Angeles Kings (1976–77)	16–46–9
72	L	March 20, 1977	1–2	@ Minnesota North Stars (1976–77)	16–47–9
73	L	March 23, 1977	0–6	Boston Bruins (1976–77)	16–48–9
74	L	March 24, 1977	1–3	@ Atlanta Flames (1976–77)	16–49–9
75	L	March 26, 1977	0–4	@ Montreal Canadiens (1976–77)	16–50–9
76	L	March 27, 1977	0–6	Montreal Canadiens (1976–77)	16–51–9
77	L	March 29, 1977	1–6	@ Washington Capitals (1976–77)	16–52–9
78	L	March 31, 1977	1–3	Minnesota North Stars (1976–77)	16–53–9

April

Game	Result	Date	Score	Opponent	Record
79	L	April 2, 1977	3–4	Pittsburgh Penguins (1976–77)	16–54–9
80	L	April 3, 1977	2–4	@ Pittsburgh Penguins (1976–77)	16–55–9

Legend: Win (2 points) Loss (0 points) Tie (1 point)

== Player statistics ==
=== Regular season ===
Scoring

Player	Pos	GP	G	A	Pts	PIM	+/-	PPG	SHG	GWG
Walt McKechnie	C	80	25	34	59	50	−24	3	3	1
Dennis Polonich	C/RW	79	18	28	46	274	−20	6	1	1
Dennis Hextall	LW	78	14	32	46	158	−35	5	0	1
Nick Libett	LW	80	14	27	41	25	−25	3	1	0
Michel Bergeron	RW	74	21	12	33	98	−40	3	0	5
Bill Lochead	LW	61	16	14	30	39	−11	4	0	3
Dan Maloney	LW	34	13	13	26	64	3	3	1	0
Buster Harvey	RW	54	11	11	22	18	−13	2	3	1
J.P. LeBlanc	C	74	7	11	18	40	−16	0	0	2
Jim Nahrgang	D	53	5	11	16	34	−12	3	1	1
Al Cameron	D	80	3	13	16	112	−43	1	0	0
Rick Wilson	D	77	3	13	16	56	−20	0	0	0
Rick Lapointe	D	49	2	11	13	80	−17	1	0	0
Terry Harper	D	52	4	8	12	28	−23	1	0	0
Danny Grant	RW	42	2	10	12	4	−34	0	0	0
Greg Joly	D	53	1	11	12	14	−22	1	0	0
Jean Hamel	D	71	1	10	11	63	−18	0	0	0
Mike Bloom	LW	45	6	3	9	22	−10	0	0	0
Bobby Sheehan	C	34	5	4	9	2	−10	0	0	0
Bob Ritchie	LW	17	6	2	8	10	−13	1	0	0
Fred Williams	C	44	2	5	7	10	−17	0	0	0
Terry Murray	D	23	0	7	7	10	−18	0	0	0
Dave Kelly	RW	16	2	0	2	4	−8	0	0	1
Steve Coates	RW	5	1	0	1	24	−1	0	0	0
Dwight Schofield	D	3	1	0	1	2	0	0	0	0
Ed Giacomin	G	33	0	1	1	4	0	0	0	0
Reed Larson	D	14	0	1	1	23	−2	0	0	0
Jim Rutherford	G	48	0	1	1	2	0	0	0	0
Bryan Watson	D	14	0	1	1	39	2	0	0	0
Fred Berry	C	3	0	0	0	0	−3	0	0	0
Larry Giroux	D	2	0	0	0	2	0	0	0	0
Fern LeBlanc	C	3	0	0	0	0	−3	0	0	0
Don Martineau	RW	1	0	0	0	0	0	0	0	0
Brian McCutcheon	LW	12	0	0	0	0	0	0	0	0
Terry Richardson	G	5	0	0	0	2	0	0	0	0
Kevin Schamehorn	RW	3	0	0	0	9	−1	0	0	0

Goaltending

Player	MIN	GP	W	L	T	GA	GAA	SO
Ed Giacomin	1791	33	8	18	3	107	3.58	3
Jim Rutherford	2740	48	7	34	6	180	3.94	0
Terry Richardson	269	5	1	3	0	18	4.01	0
Team:	4800	80	16	55	9	305	3.81	3

Note: GP = Games played; G = Goals; A = Assists; Pts = Points; +/- = Plus-minus PIM = Penalty minutes; PPG = Power-play goals; SHG = Short-handed goals; GWG = Game-winning goals;
MIN = Minutes played; W = Wins; L = Losses; T = Ties; GA = Goals against; GAA = Goals-against average; SO = Shutouts;

== Draft picks ==
Detroit's draft picks at the 1976 NHL amateur draft held in Montreal.

Round	#	Player	Nationality	College/Junior/Club team (League)
1	4	Fred Williams	Canada	Saskatoon Blades (WCHL)
2	22	Reed Larson	United States	University of Minnesota (WCHA)
3	40	Fred Berry	Canada	New Westminster Bruins (WCHL)
4	58	Kevin Schamehorn	Canada	New Westminster Bruins (WCHL)
5	78	Dwight Schofield	United States	London Knights (OMJHL)
6	94	Tony Horvath	Canada	Sault Ste. Marie Greyhounds (OMJHL)
7	111	Fern LeBlanc	Canada	Sherbrooke Castors (QMJHL)
8	120	Claude Legris	Canada	Sorel Eperviers (QMJHL)

== See also ==
- 1976–77 NHL season
