= 1976–77 Boston Bruins season =

NHL team season

1976–77 Boston Bruins
- Adams Division champions
- Division: 1st Adams
- Conference: 2nd Wales
- 1976–77 record: 49–23–8
- Home record: 27–7–6
- Road record: 22–16–2
- Goals for: 312
- Goals against: 240

Team information
- General manager: Harry Sinden
- Coach: Don Cherry
- Captain: Johnny Bucyk
- Alternate captains: None
- Arena: Boston Garden

Team leaders
- Goals: Peter McNab (38)
- Assists: Jean Ratelle (61)
- Points: Jean Ratelle (94)
- Penalty minutes: Mike Milbury (166)
- Wins: Gilles Gilbert (18)
- Goals against average: Gilles Gilbert (2.85)

The 1976–77 Boston Bruins season was the Bruins' 53rd season in the NHL. The season involved participating in the Stanley Cup finals.

== Offseason ==
=== NHL draft ===
| Round | # | Player | Nationality | College/Junior/Club team |
|---|---|---|---|---|
| 1 | 16 | Clayton Pachal (C) | Canada | New Westminster Bruins (WCHL) |
| 2 | 34 | Lorry Gloeckner (D) | Canada | Victoria Cougars (WCHL) |
| 4 | 70 | Bob Miller (C) | United States | Ottawa 67's (OMJHL) |
| 5 | 88 | Peter Vandemark (LW) | Canada | Oshawa Generals (OMJHL) |
| 6 | 106 | Ted Olson (LW) | Canada | Calgary Centennials (WCHL) |

== Regular season ==
=== Season standings ===
Adams Division
| | GP | W | L | T | GF | GA | Pts |
|---|---|---|---|---|---|---|---|
| **Boston Bruins** | 80 | 49 | 23 | 8 | 312 | 240 | 106 |
| **Buffalo Sabres** | 80 | 48 | 24 | 8 | 301 | 220 | 104 |
| **Toronto Maple Leafs** | 80 | 33 | 32 | 15 | 301 | 285 | 81 |
| Cleveland Barons | 80 | 25 | 42 | 13 | 240 | 292 | 63 |

Note: GP = Games played, W = Wins, L = Losses, T = Ties, Pts = Points, GF = Goals for, GA = Goals against
Note: Teams that qualified for the playoffs are highlighted in bold.

=== Record vs. opponents ===
Adams Division record vs. opponents

**Vs. Wales Conference**

**Vs. Campbell Conference**

**Vs. Adams Division**

1976–77 NHL records
| Team | **BOS** | **BUF** | **CLE** | **TOR** | **Total** |
|---|---|---|---|---|---|
| Boston | — | 3–3 | 5–1 | 3–2–1 | **11–6–1** |
| Buffalo | 3–3 | — | 5–1 | 5–0–1 | **13–4–1** |
| Cleveland | 1–5 | 1–5 | — | 2–4 | **4–14–0** |
| Toronto | 2–3–1 | 0–5–1 | 4–2 | — | **6–10–1** |

**Vs. Norris Division**

1976–77 NHL records
| Team | **DET** | **LAK** | **MTL** | **PIT** | **WSH** | **Total** |
|---|---|---|---|---|---|---|
| Boston | 4–1 | 2–2–1 | 3–2 | 3–1–1 | 4–0–1 | **16–6–3** |
| Buffalo | 4–1 | 3–2 | 2–2–1 | 0–4–1 | 4–1 | **13–10–2** |
| Cleveland | 2–3 | 1–2–2 | 0–5 | 0–3–2 | 5–0 | **8–13–4** |
| Toronto | 3–1–1 | 2–1–2 | 1–2–2 | 1–2–2 | 2–3 | **9–9–7** |

**Vs. Patrick Division**

1976–77 NHL records
| Team | **ATL** | **NYI** | **NYR** | **PHI** | **Total** |
|---|---|---|---|---|---|
| Boston | 2–2 | 1–2–1 | 4–0–1 | 1–3 | **8–7–2** |
| Buffalo | 2–1–1 | 1–3–1 | 4–0 | 2–2 | **9–6–2** |
| Cleveland | 2–1–1 | 0–3–1 | 0–3–1 | 1–3–1 | **3–10–4** |
| Toronto | 4–1 | 2–1–1 | 1–2–1 | 1–2–1 | **8–6–3** |

**Vs. Smythe Division**

1976–77 NHL records
| Team | **CHI** | **COL** | **MIN** | **STL** | **VAN** | **Total** |
|---|---|---|---|---|---|---|
| Boston | 4–0 | 3–1 | 1–2–1 | 2–1–1 | 4–0 | **14–4–2** |
| Buffalo | 3–1 | 3–0–1 | 2–1–1 | 2–2 | 3–0–1 | **13–4–3** |
| Cleveland | 3–1 | 2–1–1 | 1–1–2 | 2–1–1 | 2–1–1 | **10–5–5** |
| Toronto | 1–2–1 | 2–1–1 | 3–1 | 2–2 | 2–1–1 | **10–7–3** |

== Schedule and results ==
1976–77 regular season
October

| Game | Result | Date | Score | Opponent | Record |
|---|---|---|---|---|---|
| 1 | W | October 7, 1976 | 6–2 | Minnesota North Stars (1976–77) | 1–0–0 |
| 2 | L | October 9, 1976 | 5–7 | @ Toronto Maple Leafs (1976–77) | 1–1–0 |
| 3 | W | October 10, 1976 | 4–3 | Cleveland Barons (1976–77) | 2–1–0 |
| 4 | W | October 13, 1976 | 5–1 | @ New York Rangers (1976–77) | 3–1–0 |
| 5 | W | October 15, 1976 | 5–3 | Toronto Maple Leafs (1976–77) | 4–1–0 |
| 6 | W | October 17, 1976 | 5–3 | Montreal Canadiens (1976–77) | 5–1–0 |
| 7 | L | October 19, 1976 | 5–6 | @ St. Louis Blues (1976–77) | 5–2–0 |
| 8 | W | October 20, 1976 | 2–1 | @ Colorado Rockies (1976–77) | 6–2–0 |
| 9 | W | October 23, 1976 | 4–2 | @ Los Angeles Kings (1976–77) | 7–2–0 |
| 10 | W | October 27, 1976 | 4–3 | @ New York Rangers (1976–77) | 8–2–0 |
| 11 | W | October 30, 1976 | 4–3 | @ Montreal Canadiens (1976–77) | 9–2–0 |
| 12 | L | October 31, 1976 | 1–4 | @ Buffalo Sabres (1976–77) | 9–3–0 |

November

| Game | Result | Date | Score | Opponent | Record |
|---|---|---|---|---|---|
| 13 | W | November 4, 1976 | 7–5 | Chicago Black Hawks (1976–77) | 10–3–0 |
| 14 | W | November 7, 1976 | 3–1 | Vancouver Canucks (1976–77) | 11–3–0 |
| 15 | W | November 10, 1976 | 6–4 | @ Detroit Red Wings (1976–77) | 12–3–0 |
| 16 | T | November 11, 1976 | 2–2 | New York Islanders (1976–77) | 12–3–1 |
| 17 | W | November 14, 1976 | 5–3 | Colorado Rockies (1976–77) | 13–3–1 |
| 18 | W | November 18, 1976 | 3–2 | Washington Capitals (1976–77) | 14–3–1 |
| 19 | W | November 19, 1976 | 4–1 | @ Washington Capitals (1976–77) | 15–3–1 |
| 20 | W | November 21, 1976 | 4–2 | Detroit Red Wings (1976–77) | 16–3–1 |
| 21 | W | November 24, 1976 | 4–0 | @ Pittsburgh Penguins (1976–77) | 17–3–1 |
| 22 | W | November 25, 1976 | 4–2 | Vancouver Canucks (1976–77) | 18–3–1 |
| 23 | L | November 27, 1976 | 2–4 | @ Toronto Maple Leafs (1976–77) | 18–4–1 |
| 24 | L | November 30, 1976 | 2–6 | Buffalo Sabres (1976–77) | 18–5–1 |

December

| Game | Result | Date | Score | Opponent | Record |
|---|---|---|---|---|---|
| 25 | W | December 1, 1976 | 5–3 | @ Chicago Black Hawks (1976–77) | 19–5–1 |
| 26 | L | December 3, 1976 | 1–3 | @ Atlanta Flames (1976–77) | 19–6–1 |
| 27 | T | December 5, 1976 | 5–5 | Washington Capitals (1976–77) | 19–6–2 |
| 28 | L | December 9, 1976 | 1–3 | Philadelphia Flyers (1976–77) | 19–7–2 |
| 29 | L | December 11, 1976 | 3–4 | @ Philadelphia Flyers (1976–77) | 19–8–2 |
| 30 | L | December 12, 1976 | 3–5 | Detroit Red Wings (1976–77) | 19–9–2 |
| 31 | W | December 16, 1976 | 5–2 | St. Louis Blues (1976–77) | 20–9–2 |
| 32 | L | December 18, 1976 | 4–6 | @ Cleveland Barons (1976–77) | 20–10–2 |
| 33 | W | December 19, 1976 | 6–3 | Pittsburgh Penguins (1976–77) | 21–10–2 |
| 34 | L | December 21, 1976 | 0–3 | @ New York Islanders (1976–77) | 21–11–2 |
| 35 | T | December 23, 1976 | 3–3 | New York Rangers (1976–77) | 21–11–3 |
| 36 | W | December 26, 1976 | 6–3 | Cleveland Barons (1976–77) | 22–11–3 |
| 37 | W | December 29, 1976 | 8–1 | @ Vancouver Canucks (1976–77) | 23–11–3 |

January

| Game | Result | Date | Score | Opponent | Record |
|---|---|---|---|---|---|
| 38 | L | January 1, 1977 | 2–5 | @ Los Angeles Kings (1976–77) | 23–12–3 |
| 39 | W | January 5, 1977 | 3–2 | @ Cleveland Barons (1976–77) | 24–12–3 |
| 40 | L | January 8, 1977 | 1–3 | @ Minnesota North Stars (1976–77) | 24–13–3 |
| 41 | W | January 9, 1977 | 4–2 | @ Chicago Black Hawks (1976–77) | 25–13–3 |
| 42 | W | January 11, 1977 | 3–2 | @ Washington Capitals (1976–77) | 26–13–3 |
| 43 | W | January 13, 1977 | 4–3 | Los Angeles Kings (1976–77) | 27–13–3 |
| 44 | T | January 15, 1977 | 3–3 | Minnesota North Stars (1976–77) | 27–13–4 |
| 45 | W | January 17, 1977 | 7–3 | Montreal Canadiens (1976–77) | 28–13–4 |
| 46 | L | January 20, 1977 | 3–4 | New York Islanders (1976–77) | 28–14–4 |
| 47 | W | January 21, 1977 | 5–2 | @ Cleveland Barons (1976–77) | 29–14–4 |
| 48 | W | January 23, 1977 | 3–0 | Atlanta Flames (1976–77) | 30–14–4 |
| 49 | L | January 27, 1977 | 4–6 | Colorado Rockies (1976–77) | 30–15–4 |
| 50 | T | January 29, 1977 | 3–3 | Toronto Maple Leafs (1976–77) | 30–15–5 |
| 51 | L | January 30, 1977 | 2–5 | @ Pittsburgh Penguins (1976–77) | 30–16–5 |

February

| Game | Result | Date | Score | Opponent | Record |
|---|---|---|---|---|---|
| 52 | T | February 1, 1977 | 3–3 | @ St. Louis Blues (1976–77) | 30–16–6 |
| 53 | W | February 3, 1977 | 5–4 | St. Louis Blues (1976–77) | 31–16–6 |
| 54 | L | February 4, 1977 | 3–6 | @ Atlanta Flames (1976–77) | 31–17–6 |
| 55 | W | February 6, 1977 | 5–2 | Washington Capitals (1976–77) | 32–17–6 |
| 56 | L | February 10, 1977 | 3–4 | @ Buffalo Sabres (1976–77) | 32–18–6 |
| 57 | L | February 12, 1977 | 3–8 | @ Montreal Canadiens (1976–77) | 32–19–6 |
| 58 | W | February 13, 1977 | 4–2 | Cleveland Barons (1976–77) | 33–19–6 |
| 59 | W | February 16, 1977 | 7–3 | @ Vancouver Canucks (1976–77) | 34–19–6 |
| 60 | L | February 19, 1977 | 0–2 | @ Los Angeles Kings (1976–77) | 34–20–6 |
| 61 | L | February 23, 1977 | 1–2 | @ Minnesota North Stars (1976–77) | 34–21–6 |
| 62 | W | February 25, 1977 | 5–2 | @ Colorado Rockies (1976–77) | 35–21–6 |
| 63 | T | February 27, 1977 | 2–2 | @ Pittsburgh Penguins (1976–77) | 35–21–7 |

March

| Game | Result | Date | Score | Opponent | Record |
|---|---|---|---|---|---|
| 64 | W | March 1, 1977 | 8–3 | Detroit Red Wings (1976–77) | 36–21–7 |
| 65 | W | March 3, 1977 | 4–1 | @ New York Rangers (1976–77) | 37–21–7 |
| 66 | W | March 5, 1977 | 3–1 | Buffalo Sabres (1976–77) | 38–21–7 |
| 67 | W | March 6, 1977 | 6–2 | Chicago Black Hawks (1976–77) | 39–21–7 |
| 68 | W | March 8, 1977 | 3–2 | Atlanta Flames (1976–77) | 40–21–7 |
| 69 | W | March 10, 1977 | 10–3 | New York Rangers (1976–77) | 41–21–7 |
| 70 | W | March 12, 1977 | 3–1 | @ Philadelphia Flyers (1976–77) | 42–21–7 |
| 71 | T | March 13, 1977 | 2–2 | Los Angeles Kings (1976–77) | 42–21–8 |
| 72 | W | March 17, 1977 | 4–2 | Buffalo Sabres (1976–77) | 43–21–8 |
| 73 | L | March 21, 1977 | 1–5 | Montreal Canadiens (1976–77) | 43–22–8 |
| 74 | W | March 23, 1977 | 6–0 | @ Detroit Red Wings (1976–77) | 44–22–8 |
| 75 | L | March 24, 1977 | 2–6 | Philadelphia Flyers (1976–77) | 44–23–8 |
| 76 | W | March 26, 1977 | 7–5 | @ Toronto Maple Leafs (1976–77) | 45–23–8 |
| 77 | W | March 27, 1977 | 3–0 | Pittsburgh Penguins (1976–77) | 46–23–8 |
| 78 | W | March 30, 1977 | 4–3 | @ Buffalo Sabres (1976–77) | 47–23–8 |

April

| Game | Result | Date | Score | Opponent | Record |
|---|---|---|---|---|---|
| 79 | W | April 2, 1977 | 5–3 | @ New York Islanders (1976–77) | 48–23–8 |
| 80 | W | April 3, 1977 | 7–4 | Toronto Maple Leafs (1976–77) | 49–23–8 |

Legend: Win (2 points) Loss (0 points) Tie (1 point)

== Player statistics ==
=== Regular season ===
Scoring

| Player | Pos | GP | G | A | Pts | PIM | +/− | PPG | SHG | GWG |
|---|---|---|---|---|---|---|---|---|---|---|
| Jean Ratelle | C | 78 | 33 | 61 | 94 | 22 | 19 | 8 | 1 | 6 |
| Peter McNab | C | 80 | 38 | 48 | 86 | 11 | 26 | 6 | 0 | 8 |
| Gregg Sheppard | C | 77 | 31 | 36 | 67 | 20 | 3 | 8 | 1 | 5 |
| Brad Park | D | 77 | 12 | 55 | 67 | 67 | 47 | 4 | 1 | 4 |
| Terry O'Reilly | RW | 79 | 14 | 41 | 55 | 147 | 38 | 1 | 1 | 4 |
| Bobby Schmautz | RW | 57 | 23 | 29 | 52 | 62 | 25 | 4 | 0 | 2 |
| Wayne Cashman | LW | 65 | 15 | 37 | 52 | 76 | 4 | 3 | 0 | 3 |
| Don Marcotte | LW | 80 | 27 | 18 | 45 | 20 | 28 | 3 | 1 | 5 |
| John Bucyk | LW | 49 | 20 | 23 | 43 | 12 | −2 | 6 | 0 | 2 |
| Rick Middleton | RW | 72 | 20 | 22 | 42 | 2 | 2 | 0 | 0 | 1 |
| Stan Jonathan | LW | 69 | 17 | 13 | 30 | 69 | 1 | 1 | 0 | 2 |
| Matti Hagman | C | 75 | 11 | 17 | 28 | 0 | 6 | 1 | 0 | 0 |
| Mike Milbury | D | 77 | 6 | 18 | 24 | 166 | 25 | 0 | 0 | 2 |
| Rick Smith | D | 46 | 6 | 16 | 22 | 30 | 23 | 0 | 0 | 0 |
| Dallas Smith | D | 58 | 2 | 20 | 22 | 40 | 16 | 0 | 0 | 0 |
| Earl Anderson | RW | 40 | 10 | 11 | 21 | 4 | 4 | 1 | 0 | 3 |
| Dave Forbes | LW | 73 | 9 | 11 | 20 | 47 | 13 | 0 | 2 | 1 |
| Gary Doak | D | 76 | 3 | 13 | 16 | 107 | 15 | 0 | 0 | 0 |
| Hank Nowak | LW | 24 | 7 | 5 | 12 | 14 | 4 | 0 | 0 | 1 |
| John Wensink | LW | 23 | 4 | 6 | 10 | 32 | 5 | 0 | 0 | 0 |
| Ray Maluta | D | 23 | 2 | 3 | 5 | 4 | 4 | 0 | 0 | 0 |
| Doug Halward | D | 18 | 2 | 2 | 4 | 6 | 9 | 0 | 0 | 0 |
| Gerry Cheevers | G | 45 | 0 | 4 | 4 | 46 | 0 | 0 | 0 | 0 |
| Darryl Edestrand | D | 17 | 0 | 3 | 3 | 16 | 4 | 0 | 0 | 0 |
| Gilles Gilbert | G | 34 | 0 | 1 | 1 | 15 | 0 | 0 | 0 | 0 |
| Joe Zanussi | D | 8 | 0 | 1 | 1 | 8 | 1 | 0 | 0 | 0 |
| Clayton Pachal | C/LW | 1 | 0 | 0 | 0 | 12 | 0 | 0 | 0 | 0 |
| Jim Pettie | G | 1 | 0 | 0 | 0 | 0 | 0 | 0 | 0 | 0 |
| Al Sims | D | 1 | 0 | 0 | 0 | 0 | 1 | 0 | 0 | 0 |

Goaltending

| Player | MIN | GP | W | L | T | GA | GAA | SO |
|---|---|---|---|---|---|---|---|---|
| Gerry Cheevers | 2700 | 45 | 30 | 10 | 5 | 137 | 3.04 | 3 |
| Gilles Gilbert | 2040 | 34 | 18 | 13 | 3 | 97 | 2.85 | 1 |
| Jim Pettie | 60 | 1 | 1 | 0 | 0 | 3 | 3.00 | 0 |
| Team: | 4800 | 80 | 49 | 23 | 8 | 237 | 2.96 | 4 |

=== Playoffs ===
Scoring

| Player | Pos | GP | G | A | Pts | PIM | PPG | SHG | GWG |
|---|---|---|---|---|---|---|---|---|---|
| Jean Ratelle | C | 14 | 5 | 12 | 17 | 4 | 1 | 0 | 1 |
| Bobby Schmautz | RW | 14 | 11 | 1 | 12 | 10 | 4 | 0 | 1 |
| Gregg Sheppard | C | 14 | 5 | 7 | 12 | 8 | 1 | 1 | 2 |
| Brad Park | D | 14 | 2 | 10 | 12 | 4 | 0 | 0 | 0 |
| Don Marcotte | LW | 14 | 5 | 6 | 11 | 10 | 0 | 1 | 0 |
| Terry O'Reilly | RW | 14 | 5 | 6 | 11 | 28 | 0 | 0 | 1 |
| Rick Middleton | RW | 13 | 5 | 4 | 9 | 0 | 0 | 0 | 1 |
| Wayne Cashman | LW | 14 | 1 | 8 | 9 | 18 | 0 | 0 | 0 |
| Rick Smith | D | 14 | 0 | 9 | 9 | 14 | 0 | 0 | 0 |
| Peter McNab | C | 14 | 5 | 3 | 8 | 2 | 2 | 0 | 0 |
| Stan Jonathan | LW | 14 | 4 | 2 | 6 | 24 | 0 | 0 | 1 |
| Mike Milbury | D | 13 | 2 | 2 | 4 | 47 | 0 | 0 | 1 |
| John Wensink | LW | 13 | 0 | 3 | 3 | 8 | 0 | 0 | 0 |
| Gary Doak | D | 14 | 0 | 2 | 2 | 26 | 0 | 0 | 0 |
| Dave Forbes | LW | 14 | 0 | 1 | 1 | 2 | 0 | 0 | 0 |
| Matti Hagman | C | 8 | 0 | 1 | 1 | 0 | 0 | 0 | 0 |
| Earl Anderson | RW | 2 | 0 | 0 | 0 | 0 | 0 | 0 | 0 |
| John Bucyk | LW | 5 | 0 | 0 | 0 | 0 | 0 | 0 | 0 |
| Gerry Cheevers | G | 14 | 0 | 0 | 0 | 4 | 0 | 0 | 0 |
| Darryl Edestrand | D | 3 | 0 | 0 | 0 | 2 | 0 | 0 | 0 |
| Gilles Gilbert | G | 1 | 0 | 0 | 0 | 0 | 0 | 0 | 0 |
| Doug Halward | D | 6 | 0 | 0 | 0 | 4 | 0 | 0 | 0 |
| Al Sims | D | 2 | 0 | 0 | 0 | 0 | 0 | 0 | 0 |

Goaltending

| Player | MIN | GP | W | L | GA | GAA | SO |
|---|---|---|---|---|---|---|---|
| Gerry Cheevers | 858 | 14 | 8 | 5 | 44 | 3.08 | 1 |
| Gilles Gilbert | 20 | 1 | 0 | 1 | 3 | 9.00 | 0 |
| Team: | 878 | 14 | 8 | 6 | 47 | 3.21 | 1 |

Note:

Pos = Position;GP = Games played; G = Goals; A = Assists; Pts = Points; PIM = Penalty minutes; +/- = Plus/minus; PPG = Power-play goals; SHG = Short-handed goals; GWG = Game-winning goals
Pos = Position;GP = Games played; Min, TOI = Minutes played; W = Wins; L = Losses; T,T/OT = Ties; OTL = Overtime losses; GA = Goals-against; GAA = Goals-against average; SO = Shutouts; SA = Shots against; SV = Shots saved;SV% = Save percentage;

== Playoffs ==
Boston Bruins vs. Montreal Canadiens

| Date | Visitors | Score | Home | Score | Notes |
|---|---|---|---|---|---|
| May 7 | Boston | 3 | Montreal | 7 | |
| May 10 | Boston | 0 | Montreal | 3 | |
| May 12 | Montreal | 4 | Boston | 2 | |
| May 14 | Montreal | 2 | Boston | 1 | OT |

Montreal wins the series 4–0.

Guy Lafleur won the Conn Smythe Trophy as playoff MVP.

== Awards and honors ==
- John Bucyk, Lester Patrick Trophy
