= 1976–77 New York Islanders season =

NHL hockey team season

1976–77 New York Islanders
- Division: 2nd Patrick
- Conference: 2nd Campbell
- 1976–77 record: 47–21–12
- Home record: 24–11–5
- Road record: 23–10–7
- Goals for: 288
- Goals against: 193

Team information
- General manager: Bill Torrey
- Coach: Al Arbour
- Captain: Ed Westfall, then Clark Gillies
- Alternate captains: None
- Arena: Nassau Coliseum

Team leaders
- Goals: Clark Gillies (33)
- Assists: Denis Potvin (55)
- Points: Denis Potvin (80)
- Penalty minutes: Garry Howatt (182)
- Wins: Chico Resch (26)
- Goals against average: Chico Resch (2.28)

The 1976–77 New York Islanders season was the fifth season for the franchise in the National Hockey League (NHL).

== Regular season ==
=== Final standings ===
Patrick Division
| | GP | W | L | T | GF | GA | Pts |
|---|---|---|---|---|---|---|---|
| **Philadelphia Flyers** | 80 | 48 | 16 | 16 | 323 | 213 | 112 |
| **New York Islanders** | 80 | 47 | 21 | 12 | 288 | 193 | 106 |
| **Atlanta Flames** | 80 | 34 | 34 | 12 | 264 | 265 | 80 |
| New York Rangers | 80 | 29 | 37 | 14 | 272 | 310 | 72 |

Note: GP = Games played, W = Wins, L = Losses, T = Ties, Pts = Points, GF = Goals for, GA = Goals against
Note: Teams that qualified for the playoffs are highlighted in bold.

=== Record vs. opponents ===
Patrick Division record vs. opponents

**Vs. Campbell Conference**

**Vs. Wales Conference**

**Vs. Patrick Division**

1976–77 NHL records
| Team | **ATL** | **NYI** | **NYR** | **PHI** | **Total** |
|---|---|---|---|---|---|
| Atlanta | — | 0–6 | 4–1–1 | 2–2–2 | **6–9–3** |
| N.Y. Islanders | 6–0 | — | 4–1–1 | 3–2–1 | **13–3–2** |
| N.Y. Rangers | 1–4–1 | 1–4–1 | — | 0–2–4 | **2–10–6** |
| Philadelphia | 2–2–2 | 2–3–1 | 2–0–4 | — | **6–5–7** |

**Vs. Smythe Division**

1976–77 NHL records
| Team | **CHI** | **COL** | **MIN** | **STL** | **VAN** | **Total** |
|---|---|---|---|---|---|---|
| Atlanta | 3–2 | 3–1–1 | 2–1–2 | 4–1 | 1–3–1 | **13–8–4** |
| N.Y. Islanders | 3–1–1 | 5–0 | 3–1–1 | 3–1–1 | 4–1 | **18–4–3** |
| N.Y. Rangers | 2–2–1 | 3–1–1 | 5–0 | 2–2–1 | 3–2 | **15–7–3** |
| Philadelphia | 3–0–2 | 5–0 | 3–0–2 | 5–0 | 4–0–1 | **20–0–5** |

**Vs. Adams Division**

1976–77 NHL records
| Team | **BOS** | **BUF** | **CLE** | **TOR** | **Total** |
|---|---|---|---|---|---|
| Atlanta | 2–2 | 1–2–1 | 1–2–1 | 1–4 | **5–10–2** |
| N.Y. Islanders | 2–1–1 | 3–1–1 | 3–0–1 | 1–2–1 | **9–4–4** |
| N.Y. Rangers | 0–4–1 | 0–4 | 3–0–1 | 2–1–1 | **5–9–3** |
| Philadelphia | 3–1 | 2–2 | 3–1–1 | 2–1–1 | **10–5–2** |

**Vs. Norris Division**

1976–77 NHL records
| Team | **DET** | **LAK** | **MTL** | **PIT** | **WSH** | **Total** |
|---|---|---|---|---|---|---|
| Atlanta | 2–1–1 | 2–2 | 0–3–1 | 3–0–1 | 3–1 | **10–7–3** |
| N.Y. Islanders | 2–2 | 2–2 | 0–4 | 2–2 | 1–0–3 | **7–10–3** |
| N.Y. Rangers | 3–1 | 0–3–1 | 1–3 | 1–2–1 | 2–2 | **7–11–2** |
| Philadelphia | 3–1 | 4–0 | 0–4 | 3–1 | 2–0–2 | **12–6–2** |

== Schedule and results ==
1976–77 regular season
October

| Game | Result | Date | Score | Opponent | Record |
|---|---|---|---|---|---|
| 1 | W | October 7, 1976 | 3–0 | @ Philadelphia Flyers (1976–77) | 1–0–0 |
| 2 | W | October 9, 1976 | 2–1 | Chicago Black Hawks (1976–77) | 2–0–0 |
| 3 | W | October 12, 1976 | 7–0 | Atlanta Flames (1976–77) | 3–0–0 |
| 4 | W | October 13, 1976 | 4–3 | @ Buffalo Sabres (1976–77) | 4–0–0 |
| 5 | T | October 16, 1976 | 4–4 | Cleveland Barons (1976–77) | 4–0–1 |
| 6 | W | October 19, 1976 | 6–1 | Vancouver Canucks (1976–77) | 5–0–1 |
| 7 | L | October 22, 1976 | 0–5 | @ Detroit Red Wings (1976–77) | 5–1–1 |
| 8 | W | October 23, 1976 | 5–2 | @ Toronto Maple Leafs (1976–77) | 6–1–1 |
| 9 | L | October 25, 1976 | 1–4 | @ Montreal Canadiens (1976–77) | 6–2–1 |
| 10 | W | October 28, 1976 | 5–2 | St. Louis Blues (1976–77) | 7–2–1 |
| 11 | T | October 30, 1976 | 3–3 | Philadelphia Flyers (1976–77) | 7–2–2 |

November

| Game | Result | Date | Score | Opponent | Record |
|---|---|---|---|---|---|
| 12 | W | November 1, 1976 | 3–2 | @ Vancouver Canucks (1976–77) | 8–2–2 |
| 13 | W | November 2, 1976 | 5–1 | @ Colorado Rockies (1976–77) | 9–2–2 |
| 14 | W | November 6, 1976 | 5–2 | Minnesota North Stars (1976–77) | 10–2–2 |
| 15 | W | November 9, 1976 | 8–1 | Detroit Red Wings (1976–77) | 11–2–2 |
| 16 | T | November 11, 1976 | 2–2 | @ Boston Bruins (1976–77) | 11–2–3 |
| 17 | W | November 13, 1976 | 3–2 | @ Minnesota North Stars (1976–77) | 12–2–3 |
| 18 | W | November 18, 1976 | 3–1 | @ Los Angeles Kings (1976–77) | 13–2–3 |
| 19 | W | November 19, 1976 | 6–4 | @ Vancouver Canucks (1976–77) | 14–2–3 |
| 20 | L | November 23, 1976 | 1–5 | Montreal Canadiens (1976–77) | 14–3–3 |
| 21 | L | November 25, 1976 | 1–3 | Detroit Red Wings (1976–77) | 14–4–3 |
| 22 | W | November 27, 1976 | 3–1 | @ Pittsburgh Penguins (1976–77) | 15–4–3 |
| 23 | L | November 28, 1976 | 3–5 | @ Philadelphia Flyers (1976–77) | 15–5–3 |
| 24 | L | November 30, 1976 | 2–4 | Toronto Maple Leafs (1976–77) | 15–6–3 |

December

| Game | Result | Date | Score | Opponent | Record |
|---|---|---|---|---|---|
| 25 | L | December 2, 1976 | 2–4 | Pittsburgh Penguins (1976–77) | 15–7–3 |
| 26 | W | December 4, 1976 | 3–0 | Buffalo Sabres (1976–77) | 16–7–3 |
| 27 | W | December 7, 1976 | 4–2 | St. Louis Blues (1976–77) | 17–7–3 |
| 28 | W | December 11, 1976 | 6–3 | Pittsburgh Penguins (1976–77) | 18–7–3 |
| 29 | W | December 12, 1976 | 6–2 | @ Chicago Black Hawks (1976–77) | 19–7–3 |
| 30 | T | December 14, 1976 | 4–4 | New York Rangers (1976–77) | 19–7–4 |
| 31 | W | December 17, 1976 | 4–2 | @ Atlanta Flames (1976–77) | 20–7–4 |
| 32 | L | December 18, 1976 | 2–4 | Buffalo Sabres (1976–77) | 20–8–4 |
| 33 | W | December 21, 1976 | 3–0 | Boston Bruins (1976–77) | 21–8–4 |
| 34 | W | December 26, 1976 | 2–1 | @ New York Rangers (1976–77) | 22–8–4 |
| 35 | T | December 28, 1976 | 4–4 | @ St. Louis Blues (1976–77) | 22–8–5 |

January

| Game | Result | Date | Score | Opponent | Record |
|---|---|---|---|---|---|
| 36 | L | January 1, 1977 | 1–5 | Vancouver Canucks (1976–77) | 22–9–5 |
| 37 | T | January 2, 1977 | 3–3 | @ Buffalo Sabres (1976–77) | 22–9–6 |
| 38 | W | January 7, 1977 | 5–4 | @ Atlanta Flames (1976–77) | 23–9–6 |
| 39 | W | January 8, 1977 | 6–3 | Atlanta Flames (1976–77) | 24–9–6 |
| 40 | W | January 10, 1977 | 8–3 | Philadelphia Flyers (1976–77) | 25–9–6 |
| 41 | L | January 12, 1977 | 1–2 | @ Chicago Black Hawks (1976–77) | 25–10–6 |
| 42 | W | January 15, 1977 | 2–1 | Washington Capitals (1976–77) | 26–10–6 |
| 43 | T | January 16, 1977 | 2–2 | @ Washington Capitals (1976–77) | 26–10–7 |
| 44 | W | January 18, 1977 | 7–2 | Minnesota North Stars (1976–77) | 27–10–7 |
| 45 | W | January 20, 1977 | 4–3 | @ Boston Bruins (1976–77) | 28–10–7 |
| 46 | L | January 22, 1977 | 2–3 | @ Pittsburgh Penguins (1976–77) | 28–11–7 |
| 47 | W | January 23, 1977 | 7–1 | @ Colorado Rockies (1976–77) | 29–11–7 |
| 48 | L | January 27, 1977 | 1–2 | Toronto Maple Leafs (1976–77) | 29–12–7 |
| 49 | L | January 29, 1977 | 0–4 | Los Angeles Kings (1976–77) | 29–13–7 |
| 50 | L | January 30, 1977 | 1–2 | @ Montreal Canadiens (1976–77) | 29–14–7 |

February

| Game | Result | Date | Score | Opponent | Record |
|---|---|---|---|---|---|
| 51 | W | February 1, 1977 | 6–3 | Buffalo Sabres (1976–77) | 30–14–7 |
| 52 | W | February 3, 1977 | 6–3 | New York Rangers (1976–77) | 31–14–7 |
| 53 | T | February 5, 1977 | 3–3 | Washington Capitals (1976–77) | 31–14–8 |
| 54 | L | February 6, 1977 | 0–4 | @ New York Rangers (1976–77) | 31–15–8 |
| 55 | W | February 8, 1977 | 4–1 | Los Angeles Kings (1976–77) | 32–15–8 |
| 56 | W | February 12, 1977 | 2–1 | Philadelphia Flyers (1976–77) | 33–15–8 |
| 57 | W | February 14, 1977 | 2–1 | @ Vancouver Canucks (1976–77) | 34–15–8 |
| 58 | L | February 15, 1977 | 0–3 | @ Los Angeles Kings (1976–77) | 34–16–8 |
| 59 | W | February 19, 1977 | 5–2 | New York Rangers (1976–77) | 35–16–8 |
| 60 | T | February 20, 1977 | 2–2 | @ Washington Capitals (1976–77) | 35–16–9 |
| 61 | W | February 22, 1977 | 2–1 | Colorado Rockies (1976–77) | 36–16–9 |
| 62 | W | February 25, 1977 | 2–1 | @ Cleveland Barons (1976–77) | 37–16–9 |
| 63 | W | February 26, 1977 | 8–2 | Atlanta Flames (1976–77) | 38–16–9 |

March

| Game | Result | Date | Score | Opponent | Record |
|---|---|---|---|---|---|
| 64 | L | March 1, 1977 | 4–5 | Montreal Canadiens (1976–77) | 38–17–9 |
| 65 | W | March 3, 1977 | 4–2 | @ Detroit Red Wings (1976–77) | 39–17–9 |
| 66 | L | March 5, 1977 | 1–2 | @ St. Louis Blues (1976–77) | 39–18–9 |
| 67 | W | March 6, 1977 | 5–0 | @ Colorado Rockies (1976–77) | 40–18–9 |
| 68 | L | March 8, 1977 | 1–3 | Minnesota North Stars (1976–77) | 40–19–9 |
| 69 | W | March 9, 1977 | 6–2 | @ Atlanta Flames (1976–77) | 41–19–9 |
| 70 | W | March 12, 1977 | 8–3 | Cleveland Barons (1976–77) | 42–19–9 |
| 71 | T | March 13, 1977 | 5–5 | @ Minnesota North Stars (1976–77) | 42–19–10 |
| 72 | W | March 16, 1977 | 5–0 | @ Chicago Black Hawks (1976–77) | 43–19–10 |
| 73 | T | March 19, 1977 | 2–2 | Chicago Black Hawks (1976–77) | 43–19–11 |
| 74 | W | March 22, 1977 | 9–2 | Colorado Rockies (1976–77) | 44–19–11 |
| 75 | T | March 23, 1977 | 1–1 | @ Toronto Maple Leafs (1976–77) | 44–19–12 |
| 76 | W | March 26, 1977 | 5–2 | St. Louis Blues (1976–77) | 45–19–12 |
| 77 | W | March 27, 1977 | 6–3 | @ Cleveland Barons (1976–77) | 46–19–12 |
| 78 | L | March 29, 1977 | 1–3 | @ Philadelphia Flyers (1976–77) | 46–20–12 |

April

| Game | Result | Date | Score | Opponent | Record |
|---|---|---|---|---|---|
| 79 | L | April 2, 1977 | 3–5 | Boston Bruins (1976–77) | 46–21–12 |
| 80 | W | April 3, 1977 | 5–2 | @ New York Rangers (1976–77) | 47–21–12 |

Legend: Win (2 points) Loss (0 points) Tie (1 point)

== Playoffs ==
=== Preliminary ===
==== (4) New York Islanders vs. (12) Chicago Black Hawks ====
| April 5 | Chicago Black Hawks | 2–5 | New York Islanders | Nassau Coliseum | Recap |
| Tony Esposito (32 saves) | | Goalie stats | Billy Smith (14 saves) |

| April 7 | Chicago Black Hawks | 1–2 | New York Islanders | Nassau Coliseum | Recap |
| Tony Esposito (17 saves) | | Goalie stats | Billy Smith (33 saves) |

| New York wins 2–0 |

=== Quarterfinals ===
==== (4) New York Islanders vs. (5) Buffalo Sabres ====
| April 11 | Buffalo Sabres | 2–4 | New York Islanders | Nassau Coliseum | Recap |
| No scoring | | First period | 12:28 – Garry Howatt (1); 18:44 – Billy Harris (1) |
| Gilbert Perreault (1) – 09:38; Rene Robert (3) – 11:39 | | Second period | 12:04 – Clark Gillies (2); 18:33 – Jude Drouin (2) |
| No scoring | | Third period | No scoring |
| Don Edwards 24 saves / 28 shots | | Goalie stats | Billy Smith 37 saves / 39 shots |

| April 13 | Buffalo Sabres | 2–4 | New York Islanders | Nassau Coliseum | Recap |
| Don Luce (1) – 11:26; Rene Robert (4) – pp – 15:40 | | First period | No scoring |
| No scoring | | Second period | 13:50 – Bob Bourne (2); 16:31 – Bryan Trottier (1) |
| No scoring | | Third period | 08:30 – Clark Gillies (3); 11:35 – Dave Lewis (1) |
| Don Edwards 18 saves / 22 shots | | Goalie stats | Billy Smith 24 saves / 26 shots |

| April 15 | New York Islanders | 4–3 | Buffalo Sabres | Buffalo Memorial Auditorium | Recap |
| Billy Harris (2) – 17:39 | | First period | 02:18 – pp – Rick Martin (2); 06:29 – pp – Jerry Korab (2) |
| Jude Drouin (3) – 10:55; Jude Drouin (4) – pp – 13:40 | | Second period | No scoring |
| Clark Gillies (4) – 00:09 | | Third period | 10:10 – pp – Don Luce (2) |
| Billy Smith 45 saves / 48 shots | | Goalie stats | Don Edwards 19 saves / 23 shots |

| April 17 | New York Islanders | 4–3 | Buffalo Sabres | Buffalo Memorial Auditorium | Recap |
| Billy Harris (3) – pp – 10:29 | | First period | 02:49 – Jocelyn Guevremont (3) |
| Ed Westfall (1) – sh – 09:54; Denis Potvin (2) – 18:51 | | Second period | 06:16 – pp – Don Luce (3) |
| Billy MacMillan (2) – 07:42 | | Third period | 04:57 – Rene Robert (5) |
| Billy Smith 26 saves / 29 shots | | Goalie stats | Gerry Desjardins 17 saves / 21 shots |

| New York won series 4–0 |

=== Semifinals ===
==== (1) Montreal Canadiens vs. (4) New York Islanders ====
| April 23 | New York Islanders | 3–4 | Montreal Canadiens | Montreal Forum |

| April 26 | New York Islanders | 0–3 | Montreal Canadiens | Montreal Forum |

| April 28 | Montreal Canadiens | 3–5 | New York Islanders | Nassau Coliseum |

| April 30 | Montreal Canadiens | 4–0 | New York Islanders | Nassau Coliseum |

| May 3 | New York Islanders | 4–3 | OT | Montreal Canadiens | Montreal Forum |

| May 5 | Montreal Canadiens | 2–1 | New York Islanders | Nassau Coliseum |

| Montreal won series 4–2 |

== Player statistics ==
Regular season
Scoring

| Player | Pos | GP | G | A | Pts | PIM | +/- | PPG | SHG | GWG |
|---|---|---|---|---|---|---|---|---|---|---|
| Denis Potvin | D | 80 | 25 | 55 | 80 | 103 | 42 | 7 | 1 | 4 |
| Bryan Trottier | C | 76 | 30 | 42 | 72 | 34 | 28 | 11 | 1 | 6 |
| Billy Harris | RW | 80 | 24 | 43 | 67 | 44 | 18 | 5 | 1 | 3 |
| Bob Nystrom | RW | 80 | 29 | 27 | 56 | 91 | 22 | 5 | 0 | 3 |
| J.P. Parise | LW | 80 | 25 | 31 | 56 | 46 | 26 | 5 | 0 | 7 |
| Clark Gillies | LW | 70 | 33 | 22 | 55 | 93 | 18 | 12 | 0 | 5 |
| Jude Drouin | C | 78 | 24 | 29 | 53 | 27 | 18 | 4 | 0 | 2 |
| Ed Westfall | D/RW | 79 | 14 | 33 | 47 | 8 | 21 | 1 | 3 | 0 |
| Jean Potvin | D | 79 | 10 | 36 | 46 | 26 | 14 | 1 | 1 | 0 |
| Bob Bourne | C | 75 | 16 | 19 | 35 | 30 | 27 | 0 | 0 | 5 |
| Lorne Henning | C | 80 | 13 | 18 | 31 | 10 | 21 | 0 | 6 | 2 |
| Garry Howatt | LW | 70 | 13 | 15 | 28 | 182 | 14 | 1 | 0 | 4 |
| Dave Lewis | D | 79 | 4 | 24 | 28 | 44 | 29 | 0 | 1 | 1 |
| Bert Marshall | D | 72 | 4 | 21 | 25 | 61 | 48 | 0 | 0 | 1 |
| Pat Price | D | 71 | 3 | 22 | 25 | 25 | 26 | 2 | 0 | 0 |
| Andre St. Laurent | C | 72 | 10 | 13 | 23 | 55 | 8 | 2 | 0 | 3 |
| Gerry Hart | D | 80 | 4 | 18 | 22 | 98 | 29 | 0 | 1 | 0 |
| Billy MacMillan | RW | 43 | 6 | 8 | 14 | 13 | 4 | 0 | 1 | 1 |
| Richie Hansen | C | 4 | 1 | 0 | 1 | 0 | −1 | 0 | 0 | 0 |
| Bob Lorimer | D | 1 | 0 | 1 | 1 | 0 | 1 | 0 | 0 | 0 |
| Chico Resch | G | 46 | 0 | 1 | 1 | 0 | 0 | 0 | 0 | 0 |
| Billy Smith | G | 36 | 0 | 1 | 1 | 12 | 0 | 0 | 0 | 0 |
| Walt Ledingham | LW | 4 | 0 | 0 | 0 | 0 | −1 | 0 | 0 | 0 |

Goaltending

| Player | MIN | GP | W | L | T | GA | GAA | SO |
|---|---|---|---|---|---|---|---|---|
| Chico Resch | 2711 | 46 | 26 | 13 | 6 | 103 | 2.28 | 4 |
| Billy Smith | 2089 | 36 | 21 | 8 | 6 | 87 | 2.50 | 2 |
| Team: | 4800 | 80 | 47 | 21 | 12 | 190 | 2.37 | 6 |

Playoffs
Scoring

| Player | Pos | GP | G | A | Pts | PIM | PPG | SHG | GWG |
|---|---|---|---|---|---|---|---|---|---|
| Billy Harris | RW | 12 | 7 | 7 | 14 | 8 | 2 | 0 | 1 |
| Jude Drouin | C | 12 | 5 | 6 | 11 | 6 | 1 | 0 | 0 |
| Denis Potvin | D | 12 | 6 | 4 | 10 | 20 | 2 | 0 | 0 |
| Bryan Trottier | C | 12 | 2 | 8 | 10 | 2 | 0 | 0 | 0 |
| Clark Gillies | LW | 12 | 4 | 4 | 8 | 15 | 0 | 0 | 4 |
| J.P. Parise | LW | 11 | 4 | 4 | 8 | 6 | 1 | 0 | 0 |
| Dave Lewis | D | 12 | 1 | 6 | 7 | 4 | 0 | 0 | 0 |
| Ed Westfall | D/RW | 12 | 1 | 5 | 6 | 0 | 0 | 1 | 0 |
| Jean Potvin | D | 11 | 0 | 4 | 4 | 6 | 0 | 0 | 0 |
| Andre St. Laurent | C | 12 | 1 | 2 | 3 | 6 | 0 | 0 | 1 |
| Bob Bourne | C | 8 | 2 | 0 | 2 | 4 | 0 | 0 | 0 |
| Billy MacMillan | RW | 12 | 2 | 0 | 2 | 7 | 0 | 0 | 2 |
| Garry Howatt | LW | 12 | 1 | 1 | 2 | 28 | 0 | 0 | 0 |
| Gerry Hart | D | 12 | 0 | 2 | 2 | 23 | 0 | 0 | 0 |
| Bob Nystrom | RW | 12 | 0 | 2 | 2 | 7 | 0 | 0 | 0 |
| Lorne Henning | C | 12 | 0 | 1 | 1 | 0 | 0 | 0 | 0 |
| Pat Price | D | 10 | 0 | 1 | 1 | 2 | 0 | 0 | 0 |
| Dave Salvian | RW | 1 | 0 | 1 | 1 | 2 | 0 | 0 | 0 |
| Bert Marshall | D | 6 | 0 | 0 | 0 | 6 | 0 | 0 | 0 |
| Chico Resch | G | 3 | 0 | 0 | 0 | 0 | 0 | 0 | 0 |
| Billy Smith | G | 10 | 0 | 0 | 0 | 8 | 0 | 0 | 0 |

Goaltending

| Player | MIN | GP | W | L | GA | GAA | SO |
|---|---|---|---|---|---|---|---|
| Billy Smith | 580 | 10 | 7 | 3 | 27 | 2.79 | 0 |
| Chico Resch | 144 | 3 | 1 | 1 | 5 | 2.08 | 0 |
| Team: | 724 | 12 | 8 | 4 | 32 | 2.65 | 0 |

Note: Pos = Position; GP = Games played; G = Goals; A = Assists; Pts = Points; +/- = plus/minus; PIM = Penalty minutes; PPG = Power-play goals; SHG = Short-handed goals; GWG = Game-winning goals
MIN = Minutes played; W = Wins; L = Losses; T = Ties; GA = Goals-against; GAA = Goals-against average; SO = Shutouts;

== Draft picks ==
New York's draft picks at the 1976 NHL amateur draft held in Montreal.

| Round | # | Player | Nationality | College/Junior/Club team (League) |
|---|---|---|---|---|
| 1 | 14 | Alex McKendry | Canada | Sudbury Wolves (OMJHL) |
| 2 | 32 | Mike Kaszycki | Canada | Sault Ste. Marie Greyhounds (OMJHL) |
| 3 | 50 | Garth MacGuigan | Canada | Montreal Juniors (QMJHL) |
| 4 | 68 | Ken Morrow | United States | Bowling Green University (CCHA) |
| 5 | 86 | Mike Hordy | Canada | Sault Ste. Marie Greyhounds (OMJHL) |
| 6 | 104 | Yvon Vautour | Canada | Laval National (QMJHL) |

== See also ==
- 1976–77 NHL season
