= 1976–77 St. Louis Blues season =

National Hockey League team season

1976–77 St. Louis Blues
- Smythe Division champions
- Division: 1st Smythe
- Conference: 4th Campbell
- 1976–77 record: 32–39–9
- Home record: 22–13–5
- Road record: 10–26–4
- Goals for: 239
- Goals against: 276

Team information
- General manager: Emile Francis
- Coach: Emile Francis
- Captain: Garry Unger
- Alternate captains: None
- Arena: St. Louis Arena

Team leaders
- Goals: Garry Unger (30)
- Assists: Bob MacMillan (39)
- Points: Bob MacMillan (58)
- Penalty minutes: Bob Gassoff (254)
- Wins: Eddie Johnston (13)
- Goals against average: Yves Belanger (3.00)

The 1976–77 St. Louis Blues season was the tenth for the franchise in St. Louis, Missouri. The Blues won the Smythe Division title with a record of 32 wins, 39 losses and nine ties, good for 73 points, and received a first-round bye in the 1977 NHL Playoffs. However, the Blues were no match for the eventual Stanley Cup champion Montreal Canadiens, as the Montrealers swept the Blues in the quarter-finals.

== Regular season ==
=== Final standings ===
Smythe Division
	GP	W	L	T	GF	GA	Pts
**St. Louis Blues**	80	32	39	9	239	276	73
**Minnesota North Stars**	80	23	39	18	240	310	64
**Chicago Black Hawks**	80	26	43	11	240	298	63
Vancouver Canucks	80	25	42	13	235	294	63
Colorado Rockies	80	20	46	14	226	307	54

Note: GP = Games played, W = Wins, L = Losses, T = Ties, Pts = Points, GF = Goals for, GA = Goals against
Note: Teams that qualified for the playoffs are highlighted in bold.

=== Record vs. opponents ===
Smythe Division record vs. opponents

**Vs. Campbell Conference**

**Vs. Wales Conference**

**Vs. Smythe Division**

1976–77 NHL records
Team	**CHI**	**COL**	**MIN**	**STL**	**VAN**	**Total**
Chicago	—	2–2–2	2–3–1	2–4	1–4–1	**7–13–4**
Colorado	2–2–2	—	3–2–1	1–4–1	2–2–2	**8–10–6**
Minnesota	3–2–1	2–3–1	—	2–2–2	1–4–1	**8–11–5**
St. Louis	4–2	4–1–1	2–2–2	—	4–1–1	**14–6–4**
Vancouver	4–1–1	2–2–2	4–1–1	1–4–1	—	**11–8–5**

**Vs. Patrick Division**

1976–77 NHL records
Team	**ATL**	**NYI**	**NYR**	**PHI**	**Total**
Chicago	2–3	1–3–1	2–2–1	0–3–2	**5–11–4**
Colorado	1–3–1	0–5	1–3–1	0–5	**2–16–2**
Minnesota	1–2–2	1–3–1	0–5	0–3–2	**2–13–5**
St. Louis	1–4	1–3–1	2–2–1	0–5	**4–14–2**
Vancouver	3–1–1	1–4	2–3	0–4–1	**6–12–2**

**Vs. Adams Division**

1976–77 NHL records
Team	**BOS**	**BUF**	**CLE**	**TOR**	**Total**
Chicago	0–4	1–3	1–3	2–1–1	**4–11–1**
Colorado	1–3	0–3–1	1–2–1	1–2–1	**3–10–3**
Minnesota	2–1–1	1–2–1	1–1–2	1–3	**5–7–4**
St. Louis	1–2–1	2–2	1–2–1	2–2	**6–8–2**
Vancouver	0–4	0–3–1	1–2–1	1–2–1	**2–11–3**

**Vs. Norris Division**

1976–77 NHL records
Team	**DET**	**LAK**	**MTL**	**PIT**	**WSH**	**Total**
Chicago	4–0	2–2	0–3–1	2–2	2–1–1	**10–8–2**
Colorado	4–0	0–2–2	0–3–1	2–2	1–3	**7–10–3**
Minnesota	3–0–1	3–1	0–3–1	1–3	1–1–2	**8–8–4**
St. Louis	3–0–1	2–2	1–3	1–3	1–3	**8–11–1**
Vancouver	1–3	2–0–2	0–4	1–2–1	2–2	**6–11–3**

== Schedule and results ==
1976–77 regular season
October

Game	Result	Date	Score	Opponent	Record
1	L	October 7, 1976	4–6	Chicago Black Hawks (1976–77)	0–1–0
2	W	October 9, 1976	2–1	New York Rangers (1976–77)	1–1–0
3	W	October 13, 1976	3–2	@ Colorado Rockies (1976–77)	2–1–0
4	W	October 16, 1976	6–3	@ Vancouver Canucks (1976–77)	3–1–0
5	L	October 17, 1976	2–6	@ Los Angeles Kings (1976–77)	3–2–0
6	W	October 19, 1976	6–5	Boston Bruins (1976–77)	4–2–0
7	L	October 21, 1976	2–6	@ Cleveland Barons (1976–77)	4–3–0
8	W	October 23, 1976	4–2	Detroit Red Wings (1976–77)	5–3–0
9	L	October 24, 1976	2–7	@ Chicago Black Hawks (1976–77)	5–4–0
10	W	October 26, 1976	5–2	Vancouver Canucks (1976–77)	6–4–0
11	L	October 28, 1976	2–5	@ New York Islanders (1976–77)	6–5–0
12	W	October 30, 1976	3–1	Colorado Rockies (1976–77)	7–5–0

November

Game	Result	Date	Score	Opponent	Record
13	W	November 3, 1976	6–2	@ Toronto Maple Leafs (1976–77)	8–5–0
14	W	November 6, 1976	3–2	Toronto Maple Leafs (1976–77)	9–5–0
15	L	November 9, 1976	1–8	Montreal Canadiens (1976–77)	9–6–0
16	L	November 10, 1976	0–5	@ Buffalo Sabres (1976–77)	9–7–0
17	L	November 13, 1976	3–5	Atlanta Flames (1976–77)	9–8–0
18	L	November 15, 1976	2–4	@ Montreal Canadiens (1976–77)	9–9–0
19	T	November 17, 1976	5–5	@ Detroit Red Wings (1976–77)	9–9–1
20	W	November 20, 1976	3–1	New York Rangers (1976–77)	10–9–1
21	W	November 24, 1976	4–2	@ Minnesota North Stars (1976–77)	11–9–1
22	L	November 26, 1976	2–5	@ Atlanta Flames (1976–77)	11–10–1
23	W	November 27, 1976	3–2	Buffalo Sabres (1976–77)	12–10–1
24	L	November 30, 1976	3–5	Colorado Rockies (1976–77)	12–11–1

December

Game	Result	Date	Score	Opponent	Record
25	T	December 3, 1976	2–2	@ Cleveland Barons (1976–77)	12–11–2
26	L	December 4, 1976	0–1	Atlanta Flames (1976–77)	12–12–2
27	L	December 7, 1976	2–4	@ New York Islanders (1976–77)	12–13–2
28	T	December 8, 1976	4–4	@ New York Rangers (1976–77)	12–13–3
29	T	December 11, 1976	1–1	Minnesota North Stars (1976–77)	12–13–4
30	L	December 12, 1976	3–5	@ Pittsburgh Penguins (1976–77)	12–14–4
31	L	December 15, 1976	1–4	@ Toronto Maple Leafs (1976–77)	12–15–4
32	L	December 16, 1976	2–5	@ Boston Bruins (1976–77)	12–16–4
33	L	December 18, 1976	0–2	Philadelphia Flyers (1976–77)	12–17–4
34	W	December 19, 1976	6–4	@ Chicago Black Hawks (1976–77)	13–17–4
35	W	December 22, 1976	2–1	@ Colorado Rockies (1976–77)	14–17–4
36	W	December 23, 1976	4–2	@ Vancouver Canucks (1976–77)	15–17–4
37	T	December 28, 1976	4–4	New York Islanders (1976–77)	15–17–5

January

Game	Result	Date	Score	Opponent	Record
38	W	January 1, 1977	3–1	Minnesota North Stars (1976–77)	16–17–5
39	L	January 2, 1977	1–2	@ Washington Capitals (1976–77)	16–18–5
40	W	January 4, 1977	4–3	Los Angeles Kings (1976–77)	17–18–5
41	L	January 6, 1977	1–7	@ Philadelphia Flyers (1976–77)	17–19–5
42	L	January 8, 1977	2–5	Vancouver Canucks (1976–77)	17–20–5
43	W	January 12, 1977	7–2	Montreal Canadiens (1976–77)	18–20–5
44	L	January 14, 1977	2–3	@ Atlanta Flames (1976–77)	18–21–5
45	W	January 15, 1977	4–0	Detroit Red Wings (1976–77)	19–21–5
46	W	January 19, 1977	5–3	@ Chicago Black Hawks (1976–77)	20–21–5
47	W	January 22, 1977	2–1	Colorado Rockies (1976–77)	21–21–5
48	L	January 23, 1977	3–6	@ Washington Capitals (1976–77)	21–22–5
49	L	January 27, 1977	0–2	Philadelphia Flyers (1976–77)	21–23–5
50	L	January 29, 1977	2–5	Washington Capitals (1976–77)	21–24–5
51	L	January 30, 1977	2–5	@ New York Rangers (1976–77)	21–25–5

February

Game	Result	Date	Score	Opponent	Record
52	T	February 1, 1977	3–3	Boston Bruins (1976–77)	21–25–6
53	L	February 3, 1977	4–5	@ Boston Bruins (1976–77)	21–26–6
54	W	February 5, 1977	6–5	Buffalo Sabres (1976–77)	22–26–6
55	W	February 8, 1977	6–3	Pittsburgh Penguins (1976–77)	23–26–6
56	W	February 12, 1977	3–1	Atlanta Flames (1976–77)	24–26–6
57	L	February 14, 1977	4–6	@ Philadelphia Flyers (1976–77)	24–27–6
58	W	February 15, 1977	5–1	Chicago Black Hawks (1976–77)	25–27–6
59	W	February 19, 1977	4–1	Washington Capitals (1976–77)	26–27–6
60	W	February 21, 1977	4–0	@ Vancouver Canucks (1976–77)	27–27–6
61	L	February 22, 1977	0–4	@ Los Angeles Kings (1976–77)	27–28–6
62	L	February 26, 1977	1–5	Philadelphia Flyers (1976–77)	27–29–6
63	L	February 28, 1977	2–5	Cleveland Barons (1976–77)	27–30–6

March

Game	Result	Date	Score	Opponent	Record
64	T	March 2, 1977	2–2	@ Colorado Rockies (1976–77)	27–30–7
65	W	March 5, 1977	2–1	New York Islanders (1976–77)	28–30–7
66	L	March 6, 1977	2–3	@ Minnesota North Stars (1976–77)	28–31–7
67	L	March 8, 1977	1–2	Pittsburgh Penguins (1976–77)	28–32–7
68	W	March 10, 1977	4–2	@ Detroit Red Wings (1976–77)	29–32–7
69	T	March 12, 1977	3–3	Minnesota North Stars (1976–77)	29–32–8
70	L	March 15, 1977	1–4	Toronto Maple Leafs (1976–77)	29–33–8
71	L	March 16, 1977	3–7	@ Pittsburgh Penguins (1976–77)	29–34–8
72	T	March 19, 1977	4–4	Vancouver Canucks (1976–77)	29–34–9
73	L	March 20, 1977	3–5	@ New York Rangers (1976–77)	29–35–9
74	W	March 22, 1977	4–2	Los Angeles Kings (1976–77)	30–35–9
75	L	March 24, 1977	1–6	@ Montreal Canadiens (1976–77)	30–36–9
76	L	March 26, 1977	2–5	@ New York Islanders (1976–77)	30–37–9
77	L	March 28, 1977	4–5	@ Minnesota North Stars (1976–77)	30–38–9
78	W	March 30, 1977	4–1	Chicago Black Hawks (1976–77)	31–38–9

April

Game	Result	Date	Score	Opponent	Record
79	W	April 2, 1977	9–2	Cleveland Barons (1976–77)	32–38–9
80	L	April 3, 1977	3–7	@ Buffalo Sabres (1976–77)	32–39–9

Legend: Win (2 points) Loss (0 points) Tie (1 point)

== Playoffs ==
The Blues lost to the Montreal Canadiens 4 – 0 in the quarterfinals.

== Player statistics ==
=== Regular season ===
Scoring

Player	Pos	GP	G	A	Pts	PIM	+/-	PPG	SHG	GWG
Bob MacMillan	RW	80	19	39	58	11	1	10	0	1
Garry Unger	C	80	30	27	57	56	−12	7	0	5
Larry Patey	C	80	21	29	50	41	11	1	2	2
Red Berenson	C	80	21	28	49	8	−28	4	0	3
Claude Larose	RW	80	29	19	48	22	5	1	1	2
Chuck Lefley	LW	71	11	30	41	12	−15	3	0	1
Pierre Plante	RW	76	18	20	38	77	−4	4	0	3
Jerry Butler	RW	80	12	20	32	65	−31	0	0	0
Rod Seiling	D	79	3	26	29	36	1	2	0	1
Ted Irvine	LW	69	14	14	28	38	−16	1	0	2
Bruce Affleck	D	80	5	20	25	24	−22	1	0	0
Bob Gassoff	D	77	6	18	24	254	−2	0	0	3
Bernie Federko	C	31	14	9	23	15	−6	6	0	3
Bob Hess	D	53	4	18	22	14	−2	1	0	0
Derek Sanderson	C	32	8	13	21	26	−8	3	0	2
Floyd Thomson	LW	58	7	8	15	11	1	0	1	2
Rick Bourbonnais	RW	33	6	8	14	10	−6	2	0	1
Brian Sutter	LW	35	4	10	14	82	−8	0	0	0
Bob Plager	D	54	1	9	10	23	−9	0	0	0
Jamie Masters	D	16	1	7	8	2	−7	1	0	0
Gilles Marotte	D	47	3	4	7	26	−13	0	0	1
Dave Hrechkosy	LW	15	1	2	3	2	0	0	0	0
Joe Zanussi	D	11	0	3	3	4	−6	0	0	0
Doug Palazzari	C	12	1	0	1	0	−3	0	0	0
Yves Belanger	G	3	0	1	1	0	0	0	0	0
Barclay Plager	D	2	0	1	1	2	1	0	0	0
Rick Smith	D	18	0	1	1	6	−3	0	0	0
Doug Grant	G	17	0	0	0	0	0	0	0	0
Eddie Johnston	G	38	0	0	0	0	0	0	0	0
Brian Ogilvie	C	3	0	0	0	0	−1	0	0	0
Ed Staniowski	G	29	0	0	0	0	0	0	0	0

Goaltending

Player	MIN	GP	W	L	T	GA	GAA	SO
Eddie Johnston	2111	38	13	16	5	108	3.07	1
Ed Staniowski	1589	29	10	16	1	108	4.08	0
Doug Grant	960	17	7	7	3	50	3.12	1
Yves Belanger	140	3	2	0	0	7	3.00	0
Team:	4800	80	32	39	9	273	3.41	2

=== Playoffs ===
Scoring

Player	Pos	GP	G	A	Pts	PIM	PPG	SHG	GWG
Bernie Federko	C	4	1	1	2	2	0	0	0
Claude Larose	RW	4	1	0	1	0	0	0	0
Larry Patey	C	4	1	0	1	0	0	0	0
Brian Sutter	LW	4	1	0	1	14	0	0	0
Rick Bourbonnais	RW	4	0	1	1	0	0	0	0
Bob Gassoff	D	4	0	1	1	10	0	0	0
Chuck Lefley	LW	1	0	1	1	2	0	0	0
Bob MacMillan	RW	4	0	1	1	0	0	0	0
Garry Unger	C	4	0	1	1	2	0	0	0
Bruce Affleck	D	4	0	0	0	0	0	0	0
Red Berenson	C	4	0	0	0	4	0	0	0
Jerry Butler	RW	4	0	0	0	14	0	0	0
Bob Hess	D	1	0	0	0	0	0	0	0
Ted Irvine	LW	3	0	0	0	2	0	0	0
Eddie Johnston	G	3	0	0	0	0	0	0	0
Gilles Marotte	D	3	0	0	0	2	0	0	0
Jamie Masters	D	1	0	0	0	0	0	0	0
Bob Plager	D	4	0	0	0	0	0	0	0
Pierre Plante	RW	4	0	0	0	2	0	0	0
Rod Seiling	D	4	0	0	0	2	0	0	0
Ed Staniowski	G	3	0	0	0	0	0	0	0
Floyd Thomson	LW	3	0	0	0	4	0	0	0

Goaltending

Player	MIN	GP	W	L	GA	GAA	SO
Eddie Johnston	138	3	0	2	9	3.91	0
Ed Staniowski	102	3	0	2	9	5.29	0
Team:	240	4	0	4	18	4.50	0

Note:

Pos = Position;GP = Games played; G = Goals; A = Assists; Pts = Points; PIM = Penalty minutes; +/- = Plus/minus; PPG = Power-play goals; SHG = Short-handed goals; GWG = Game-winning goals
Pos = Position;GP = Games played; Min, TOI = Minutes played; W = Wins; L = Losses; T,T/OT = Ties; OTL = Overtime losses; GA = Goals-against; GAA = Goals-against average; SO = Shutouts; SA = Shots against; SV = Shots saved;SV% = Save percentage;

== Draft picks ==
St. Louis's draft picks at the 1976 NHL amateur draft held in Montreal.

Round	#	Player	Nationality	College/Junior/Club team (League)
1	7	Bernie Federko	Canada	Saskatoon Blades (WCHL)
2	20	Brian Sutter	Canada	Lethbridge Broncos (WCHL)
2	25	John Smrke	Canada	Toronto Marlboros (OMJHL)
3	43	Jim Kirkpatrick	Canada	Toronto Marlboros (OMJHL)
4	56	Mike Liut	Canada	Bowling Green University (CCHA)
4	61	Paul Skidmore	United States	Boston College (ECAC)
6	97	Nels Goddard	Canada	Michigan Tech University (WCHA)
7	113	Mike Eaves	United States	University of Wisconsin (WCHA)
8	121	Jacques Soguel	Switzerland	Davos (Switzerland)
9	124	Dave Dornseif	United States	Providence College (ECAC)
10	126	Brad Wilson	United States	Providence College (ECAC)
11	128	Dan Hoene	United States	University of Michigan (WCHA)
12	130	Goran Lindblom	Sweden	Skelleftea (Sweden)
13	132	Jim Bales	Canada	University of Denver (WCHA)
14	134	Anders Hakansson	Sweden	Solna (Sweden)
15	135	Juhani Wallenius	Finland	Rauma (Finland)

== See also ==
- 1976–77 NHL season
