= 1976–77 Washington Capitals season =

National Hockey League season

1976–77 Washington Capitals
- Division: 4th Norris
- Conference: 8th Campbell
- 1976–77 record: 24–42–14
- Home record: 17–15–8
- Road record: 7–27–6
- Goals for: 221
- Goals against: 307

Team information
- General manager: Max McNab
- Coach: Tom McVie
- Captain: Yvon Labre
- Alternate captains: None
- Arena: Capital Centre

Team leaders
- Goals: Guy Charron (36)
- Assists: Guy Charron (46)
- Points: Guy Charron (82)
- Penalty minutes: Gord Lane (207)
- Plus/minus: Bill Riley (+4)
- Wins: Ron Low (16)
- Goals against average: Bernie Wolfe (3.85)

The 1976–77 Washington Capitals season was the Washington Capitals third season in the National Hockey League (NHL).

This season was much better than the past two seasons, with the Capitals winning 24 games. The Capitals missed the playoffs for the third year in a row for the first time in franchise history.

== Regular season ==
=== Final standings ===
Norris Division
	GP	W	L	T	GF	GA	Pts
**Montreal Canadiens**	80	60	8	12	387	171	132
**Los Angeles Kings**	80	34	31	15	271	241	83
**Pittsburgh Penguins**	80	34	33	13	240	252	81
Washington Capitals	80	24	42	14	221	307	62
Detroit Red Wings	80	16	55	9	183	309	41

Note: GP = Games played, W = Wins, L = Losses, T = Ties, Pts = Points, GF = Goals for, GA = Goals against
Note: Teams that qualified for the playoffs are highlighted in bold.

=== Record vs. opponents ===
Norris Division record vs. opponents

**Vs. Wales Conference**

**Vs. Campbell Conference**

**Vs. Norris Division**

1976–77 NHL records
Team	**DET**	**LAK**	**MTL**	**PIT**	**WSH**	**Total**
Detroit	—	0–5–1	0–5–1	2–4	0–3–3	**2–17–5**
Los Angeles	5–0–1	—	0–4–2	3–2–1	5–0–1	**13–6–5**
Montreal	5–0–1	4–0–2	—	4–0–2	6–0	**19–0–5**
Pittsburgh	4–2	2–3–1	0–4–2	—	1–4–1	**7–13–4**
Washington	3–0–3	0–5–1	0–6	4–1–1	—	**7–12–5**

**Vs. Adams Division**

1976–77 NHL records
Team	**BOS**	**BUF**	**CLE**	**TOR**	**Total**
Detroit	1–4	1–4	3–2	1–3–1	**6–13–1**
Los Angeles	2–2–1	2–3	2–1–2	1–2–2	**7–8–5**
Montreal	2–3	2–2–1	5–0	2–1–1	**11–6–2**
Pittsburgh	1–3–1	4–0–1	3–0–2	2–1–2	**10–4–6**
Washington	0–4–1	1–4	0–5	3–2	**4–15–1**

**Vs. Patrick Division**

1976–77 NHL records
Team	**ATL**	**NYI**	**NYR**	**PHI**	**Total**
Detroit	1–2–1	2–2	1–3	1–3	**5–10–1**
Los Angeles	2–2	2–2	3–0–1	0–4	**7–8–1**
Montreal	3–0–1	4–0	3–1	4–0	**14–1–1**
Pittsburgh	0–3–1	2–2	2–1–1	1–3	**5–9–2**
Washington	1–3	0–1–3	2–2	0–2–2	**3–8–5**

**Vs. Smythe Division**

1976–77 NHL records
Team	**CHI**	**COL**	**MIN**	**STL**	**VAN**	**Total**
Detroit	0–4	0–4	0–3–1	0–3–1	3–1	**3–15–2**
Los Angeles	2–2	2–0–2	1–3	2–2	0–2–2	**7–9–4**
Montreal	3–0–1	3–0–1	3–0–1	3–1	4–0	**16–1–3**
Pittsburgh	2–2	2–2	3–1	3–1	2–1–1	**12–7–1**
Washington	1–2–1	3–1	1–1–2	3–1	2–2	**10–7–3**

== Schedule and results ==
1976–77 regular season
October

Game	Result	Date	Score	Opponent	Record
1	W	October 5, 1976	6–5	Atlanta Flames (1976–77)	1–0–0
2	T	October 7, 1976	3–3	@ Detroit Red Wings (1976–77)	1–0–1
3	L	October 9, 1976	3–6	@ Cleveland Barons (1976–77)	1–1–1
4	L	October 13, 1976	1–4	@ Vancouver Canucks (1976–77)	1–2–1
5	L	October 16, 1976	1–7	@ Los Angeles Kings (1976–77)	1–3–1
6	L	October 19, 1976	0–6	Montreal Canadiens (1976–77)	1–4–1
7	T	October 21, 1976	5–5	Los Angeles Kings (1976–77)	1–4–2
8	L	October 24, 1976	1–2	@ Buffalo Sabres (1976–77)	1–5–2
9	W	October 29, 1976	2–1	@ Colorado Rockies (1976–77)	2–5–2
10	L	October 31, 1976	4–5	@ Chicago Black Hawks (1976–77)	2–6–2

November

Game	Result	Date	Score	Opponent	Record
11	L	November 3, 1976	0–7	@ Atlanta Flames (1976–77)	2–7–2
12	L	November 5, 1976	2–3	Buffalo Sabres (1976–77)	2–8–2
13	W	November 7, 1976	4–1	Minnesota North Stars (1976–77)	3–8–2
14	W	November 9, 1976	4–2	Vancouver Canucks (1976–77)	4–8–2
15	W	November 10, 1976	7–5	@ New York Rangers (1976–77)	5–8–2
16	L	November 12, 1976	4–5	Chicago Black Hawks (1976–77)	5–9–2
17	L	November 14, 1976	2–3	Cleveland Barons (1976–77)	5–10–2
18	L	November 18, 1976	2–3	@ Boston Bruins (1976–77)	5–11–2
19	L	November 19, 1976	1–4	Boston Bruins (1976–77)	5–12–2
20	W	November 21, 1976	3–1	Colorado Rockies (1976–77)	6–12–2
21	L	November 24, 1976	2–6	@ Atlanta Flames (1976–77)	6–13–2
22	L	November 27, 1976	1–6	@ Minnesota North Stars (1976–77)	6–14–2
23	W	November 30, 1976	6–4	Pittsburgh Penguins (1976–77)	7–14–2

December

Game	Result	Date	Score	Opponent	Record
24	L	December 1, 1976	1–4	@ New York Rangers (1976–77)	7–15–2
25	T	December 3, 1976	4–4	Philadelphia Flyers (1976–77)	7–15–3
26	T	December 5, 1976	5–5	@ Boston Bruins (1976–77)	7–15–4
27	W	December 7, 1976	4–3	Vancouver Canucks (1976–77)	8–15–4
28	L	December 10, 1976	1–7	@ Cleveland Barons (1976–77)	8–16–4
29	L	December 11, 1976	2–4	Cleveland Barons (1976–77)	8–17–4
30	L	December 14, 1976	2–4	Los Angeles Kings (1976–77)	8–18–4
31	W	December 17, 1976	3–2	Toronto Maple Leafs (1976–77)	9–18–4
32	W	December 18, 1976	5–3	@ Pittsburgh Penguins (1976–77)	10–18–4
33	L	December 23, 1976	2–5	@ Philadelphia Flyers (1976–77)	10–19–4
34	L	December 26, 1976	2–5	@ Buffalo Sabres (1976–77)	10–20–4
35	L	December 28, 1976	2–5	New York Rangers (1976–77)	10–21–4
36	L	December 29, 1976	1–3	@ Colorado Rockies (1976–77)	10–22–4

January

Game	Result	Date	Score	Opponent	Record
37	L	January 1, 1977	1–3	@ Toronto Maple Leafs (1976–77)	10–23–4
38	W	January 2, 1977	2–1	St. Louis Blues (1976–77)	11–23–4
39	T	January 4, 1977	2–2	Detroit Red Wings (1976–77)	11–23–5
40	T	January 6, 1977	3–3	Pittsburgh Penguins (1976–77)	11–23–6
41	L	January 8, 1977	2–7	@ Montreal Canadiens (1976–77)	11–24–6
42	W	January 10, 1977	2–0	@ Detroit Red Wings (1976–77)	12–24–6
43	L	January 11, 1977	2–3	Boston Bruins (1976–77)	12–25–6
44	L	January 15, 1977	1–2	@ New York Islanders (1976–77)	12–26–6
45	T	January 16, 1977	2–2	New York Islanders (1976–77)	12–26–7
46	L	January 18, 1977	0–3	Montreal Canadiens (1976–77)	12–27–7
47	W	January 19, 1977	4–2	@ Buffalo Sabres (1976–77)	13–27–7
48	L	January 22, 1977	2–5	@ Montreal Canadiens (1976–77)	13–28–7
49	W	January 23, 1977	6–3	St. Louis Blues (1976–77)	14–28–7
50	W	January 27, 1977	4–1	Detroit Red Wings (1976–77)	15–28–7
51	W	January 29, 1977	5–2	@ St. Louis Blues (1976–77)	16–28–7
52	T	January 30, 1977	5–5	Philadelphia Flyers (1976–77)	16–28–8

February

Game	Result	Date	Score	Opponent	Record
53	L	February 2, 1977	2–7	@ Los Angeles Kings (1976–77)	16–29–8
54	T	February 5, 1977	3–3	@ New York Islanders (1976–77)	16–29–9
55	L	February 6, 1977	2–5	@ Boston Bruins (1976–77)	16–30–9
56	T	February 9, 1977	4–4	@ Chicago Black Hawks (1976–77)	16–30–10
57	L	February 10, 1977	2–9	@ Philadelphia Flyers (1976–77)	16–31–10
58	L	February 12, 1977	0–10	@ Toronto Maple Leafs (1976–77)	16–32–10
59	T	February 15, 1977	3–3	Minnesota North Stars (1976–77)	16–32–11
60	T	February 17, 1977	4–4	@ Minnesota North Stars (1976–77)	16–32–12
61	L	February 19, 1977	1–4	@ St. Louis Blues (1976–77)	16–33–12
62	T	February 20, 1977	2–2	New York Islanders (1976–77)	16–33–13
63	W	February 22, 1977	3–1	Pittsburgh Penguins (1976–77)	17–33–13
64	W	February 25, 1977	4–2	Toronto Maple Leafs (1976–77)	18–33–13
65	L	February 26, 1977	1–2	@ Pittsburgh Penguins (1976–77)	18–34–13

March

Game	Result	Date	Score	Opponent	Record
66	L	March 1, 1977	2–3	Los Angeles Kings (1976–77)	18–35–13
67	W	March 3, 1977	7–4	Chicago Black Hawks (1976–77)	19–35–13
68	L	March 6, 1977	2–4	Atlanta Flames (1976–77)	19–36–13
69	L	March 9, 1977	2–5	@ Vancouver Canucks (1976–77)	19–37–13
70	L	March 10, 1977	0–6	@ Los Angeles Kings (1976–77)	19–38–13
71	T	March 13, 1977	3–3	@ Detroit Red Wings (1976–77)	19–38–14
72	L	March 15, 1977	1–5	Cleveland Barons (1976–77)	19–39–14
73	W	March 18, 1977	5–0	Colorado Rockies (1976–77)	20–39–14
74	L	March 20, 1977	2–6	Buffalo Sabres (1976–77)	20–40–14
75	W	March 25, 1977	7–2	New York Rangers (1976–77)	21–40–14
76	W	March 27, 1977	7–4	Toronto Maple Leafs (1976–77)	22–40–14
77	W	March 29, 1977	6–1	Detroit Red Wings (1976–77)	23–40–14
78	W	March 30, 1977	4–3	@ Pittsburgh Penguins (1976–77)	24–40–14

April

Game	Result	Date	Score	Opponent	Record
79	L	April 2, 1977	0–11	@ Montreal Canadiens (1976–77)	24–41–14
80	L	April 3, 1977	1–2	Montreal Canadiens (1976–77)	24–42–14

Legend: Win (2 points) Loss (0 points) Tie (1 point)

== Player statistics ==
=== Regular season ===
Scoring

Player	Pos	GP	G	A	Pts	PIM	+/-	PPG	SHG	GWG
Guy Charron	C	80	36	46	82	10	-28	6	1	4
Gerry Meehan	C	80	28	36	64	13	-11	9	1	6
Hartland Monahan	RW	79	23	27	50	37	-28	7	1	4
Garnet Bailey	LW	78	19	27	46	51	-21	2	0	2
Bob Sirois	RW	45	13	22	35	2	1	1	0	1
Jack Lynch	D	75	5	25	30	90	-15	0	0	0
Ron Lalonde	C	76	12	17	29	24	-20	0	0	0
Bill Riley	RW	43	13	14	27	124	4	5	0	2
Bill Collins	RW	54	11	14	25	26	-7	0	2	1
Rick Bragnalo	C	80	11	12	23	16	-16	1	2	1
Tony White	LW	72	12	9	21	44	-15	2	1	3
Craig Patrick	RW	28	7	10	17	2	-10	1	0	0
Gord Lane	D	80	2	15	17	207	-25	0	0	0
Rick Green	D	45	3	12	15	16	-20	1	0	0
Bryan Watson	D	56	1	14	15	91	-5	0	0	0
Yvon Labre	D	62	3	11	14	169	-5	0	2	0
Gord Smith	D	79	1	12	13	92	-27	1	0	0
Mike Lampman	LW	22	6	5	11	4	-4	1	0	0
Jean Lemieux	D	15	4	4	8	2	-9	2	0	0
Harvey Bennett	C	18	2	6	8	34	-9	0	0	0
Blair Stewart	C	34	5	2	7	85	-6	0	0	0
Bob Paradise	D	22	0	5	5	20	-3	0	0	0
Doug Patey	RW	37	3	1	4	6	-15	0	0	0
Tom Rowe	RW	12	1	2	3	2	-6	0	0	0
Peter Scamurra	D	21	0	2	2	8	-6	0	0	0
Mike Marson	LW	10	0	1	1	18	-1	0	0	0
Paul Nicholson	LW	9	0	1	1	2	-6	0	0	0
Bernie Wolfe	G	37	0	1	1	2	0	0	0	0
Larry Bolonchuk	D	9	0	0	0	12	-12	0	0	0
Roger Crozier	G	3	0	0	0	0	0	0	0	0
Alex Forsyth	C	1	0	0	0	0	0	0	0	0
Brian Kinsella	C	6	0	0	0	0	-2	0	0	0
Ron Low	G	54	0	0	0	4	0	0	0	0
Bill Mikkelson	D	1	0	0	0	2	0	0	0	0
Steve Self	C	3	0	0	0	0	-3	0	0	0

Goaltending

Player	MIN	GP	W	L	T	GA	GAA	SO
Ron Low	2918	54	16	27	5	188	3.87	0
Bernie Wolfe	1779	37	7	15	9	114	3.84	1
Roger Crozier	103	3	1	0	0	2	1.17	0
Team:	4800	80	24	42	14	304	3.80	1

Note: GP = Games played; G = Goals; A = Assists; Pts = Points; +/- = Plus/minus; PIM = Penalty minutes; PPG=Power-play goals; SHG=Short-handed goals; GWG=Game-winning goals
MIN=Minutes played; W = Wins; L = Losses; T = Ties; GA = Goals against; GAA = Goals against average; SO = Shutouts;

== Draft picks ==
Washington's draft picks at the 1976 NHL amateur draft held in Montreal.

Round	#	Player	Nationality	College/Junior/Club team (League)
1	1	Rick Green	Canada	London Knights (OHA)
1	15	Greg Carroll	Canada	Medicine Hat Tigers (WCHL)
3	37	Tom Rowe	United States	London Knights (OMJHL)
4	55	Al Glendinning	Canada	Calgary Centennials (WCHL)
5	73	Doug Patey	Canada	Sault Ste. Marie Greyhounds (OMJHL)
6	91	Jim Bedard	Canada	Sudbury Wolves (OMJHL)
6	100	Don Wilson	Canada	St. Catharines Black Hawks (OMJHL)
7	109	Dale Rideout	Canada	Flin Flon Bombers (WCHL)
8	119	Al Dumba	Canada	Regina Pats (WCHL)

== See also ==
- 1976–77 NHL season
