= Bob Warner (ice hockey) =

Canadian ice hockey player (1950–2020)

- Born: December 13, 1950; Grimsby, Ontario, Canada
- Died: June 27, 2020 (aged 69); Halifax, Nova Scotia, Canada
- Height: 5 ft 11 in (180 cm)
- Weight: 180 lb (82 kg; 12 st 12 lb)
- Position: Defence
- Shot: Left
- Played for: Toronto Maple Leafs
- NHL draft: Undrafted
- Playing career: 1970–1980

Robert Norman Warner (December 13, 1950 – June 27, 2020) was a Canadian professional ice hockey forward.

== Early life ==
Warner was born in Grimsby, Ontario. He played junior ice hockey with the Ottawa 67's. From the 1970–1971 season to 1974–1975 season, Warner played for Saint Mary's University (Halifax).

== Career ==
Warner played 10 regular season and four playoff games for the Toronto Maple Leafs of the National Hockey League between 1976 and 1977. The rest of his career, which lasted from 1970 to 1980, was spent in various minor leagues.

== Career statistics ==
=== Regular season and playoffs ===
			Regular season					Playoffs
Season	Team	League	GP	G	A	Pts	PIM	GP	G	A	Pts	PIM
1967–68	Ottawa 67's	OHA	2	0	0	0	0	—	—	—	—	—
1969–70	Ottawa 67's	OHA	7	0	0	0	2	—	—	—	—	—
1969–70	Ottawa M&W Rangers	CJHL	38	4	23	27	111	—	—	—	—	—
1970–71	Johnstown Jets	EHL	71	20	24	44	139	10	5	5	10	18
1971–72	Saint Mary's University	CIAU	18	5	10	15	33	—	—	—	—	—
1972–73	Saint Mary's University	CIAU	21	6	15	21	66	—	—	—	—	—
1973–74	Saint Mary's University	CIAU	17	4	11	15	15	—	—	—	—	—
1974–75	Saint Mary's University	CIAU	18	4	19	23	48	—	—	—	—	—
1975–76	Oklahoma City Blazers	CHL	75	7	20	27	117	4	1	0	1	9
1975–76	Toronto Maple Leafs	NHL	—	—	—	—	—	2	0	0	0	0
1976–77	Toronto Maple Leafs	NHL	10	1	1	2	4	2	0	0	0	0
1976–77	Dallas Black Hawks	CHL	69	26	19	45	75	5	2	0	2	0
1977–78	Dallas Black Hawks	CHL	61	5	14	19	62	13	2	2	4	18
1978–79	New Brunswick Hawks	AHL	80	10	14	24	52	5	0	0	0	2
1979–80	New Brunswick Hawks	AHL	61	8	6	14	35	4	0	0	0	2
CHL totals			204	38	53	91	254	22	5	2	7	27
NHL totals			10	1	1	2	4	4	0	0	0	0
