= Don Ashby =

Canadian ice hockey player (1955–1981)

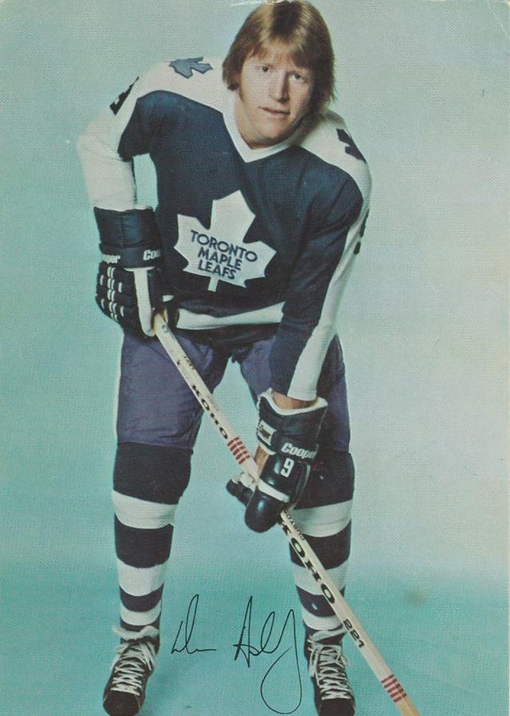
- Ashby in 1976 postcard
- Born: March 8, 1955 Kamloops, British Columbia, Canada
- Died: May 30, 1981 (aged 26) Kelowna, British Columbia, Canada
- Height: 6 ft 1 in (185 cm)
- Weight: 185 lb (84 kg; 13 st 3 lb)
- Position: Centre
- Shot: Left
- Played for: Toronto Maple Leafs; Colorado Rockies; Edmonton Oilers
- NHL draft: 6th overall, 1975; Toronto Maple Leafs
- WHA draft: 3rd overall, 1975; Michigan Stags
- Playing career: 1975–1981

Donald Allan Ashby (March 8, 1955 – May 30, 1981) was a Canadian professional ice hockey player who was a centre for six seasons in the National Hockey League from 1975–76 until 1980–81.

== Early life and career ==
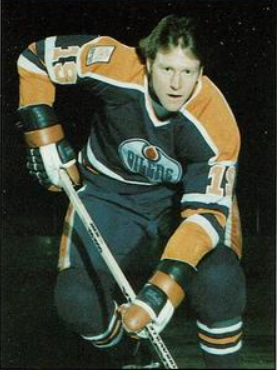
Photo of Ashby for the Edmonton Oilers reprinted for 1988 card

Ashby was born in Kamloops, British Columbia. After excelling for the Calgary Centennials in junior hockey, he was drafted by the Toronto Maple Leafs as their first-round draft pick in the 1975 NHL Amateur Draft. He was traded to the Colorado Rockies in 1978. He was traded to the Edmonton Oilers for Bobby Schmautz in 1980.

Ashby played 188 career NHL games, scoring 40 goals, 56 assists, and 96 points.

== Death ==
On May 30, 1981, a few days after finishing the 1980–81 season in which Ashby played with the CHL Wichita Wind, he and his wife, Terry, were involved in an automobile accident in the Okanagan Valley. The vehicle that they were driving was hit head-on by a pickup truck. Ashby was critically injured in the accident that occurred in the Okanagan Valley. Both he and his wife, Terry, were taken to the hospital in Kelowna, [British Columbia, where he died from massive internal injuries. He was 26 years old at the time of his death in the accident. His wife, Terry, survived the accident and was treated in the hospital. His funeral was held four days later, on June 3.

== Career statistics ==
| | | | Regular season | | | | | Playoffs |
| Season | Team | League | GP | G | A | Pts | PIM | GP | G | A | Pts | PIM |
|---|---|---|---|---|---|---|---|---|---|---|---|---|
| 1972–73 | Kamloops Rockets | BCHL | 28 | 22 | 22 | 44 | | — | — | — | — | — |
| 1972–73 | Calgary Centennials | WCHL | 36 | 10 | 12 | 22 | 0 | 6 | 0 | 1 | 1 | 0 |
| 1973–74 | Calgary Centennials | WCHL | 68 | 30 | 38 | 68 | 52 | 14 | 6 | 7 | 13 | 0 |
| 1974–75 | Calgary Centennials | WCHL | 70 | 52 | 68 | 120 | 71 | — | — | — | — | — |
| 1975–76 | Toronto Maple Leafs | NHL | 50 | 6 | 15 | 21 | 10 | — | — | — | — | — |
| 1975–76 | Oklahoma City Blazers | CHL | 26 | 9 | 14 | 23 | 36 | 4 | 0 | 1 | 1 | 2 |
| 1976–77 | Toronto Maple Leafs | NHL | 76 | 19 | 23 | 42 | 24 | 9 | 1 | 0 | 1 | 4 |
| 1976–77 | Dallas Black Hawks | CHL | 3 | 1 | 0 | 1 | 0 | — | — | — | — | — |
| 1977–78 | Toronto Maple Leafs | NHL | 12 | 1 | 2 | 3 | 0 | — | — | — | — | — |
| 1977–78 | Dallas Black Hawks | CHL | 48 | 14 | 28 | 42 | 15 | 13 | 9 | 9 | 18 | 5 |
| 1978–79 | Toronto Maple Leafs | NHL | 3 | 0 | 0 | 0 | 0 | — | — | — | — | — |
| 1978–79 | New Brunswick Hawks | AHL | 13 | 2 | 5 | 7 | 9 | — | — | — | — | — |
| 1978–79 | Colorado Rockies | NHL | 12 | 2 | 3 | 5 | 0 | — | — | — | — | — |
| 1979–80 | Colorado Rockies | NHL | 11 | 0 | 1 | 1 | 4 | — | — | — | — | — |
| 1979–80 | Fort Worth Texans | CHL | 45 | 27 | 27 | 54 | 18 | — | — | — | — | — |
| 1979–80 | Edmonton Oilers | NHL | 18 | 10 | 9 | 19 | 0 | 3 | 0 | 0 | 0 | 0 |
| 1980–81 | Edmonton Oilers | NHL | 6 | 2 | 3 | 5 | 2 | — | — | — | — | — |
| 1980–81 | Wichita Wind | CHL | 70 | 36 | 60 | 96 | 46 | 18 | 9 | 16 | 25 | 6 |
| NHL totals | | | 188 | 40 | 56 | 96 | 40 | 12 | 1 | 0 | 1 | 4 |
| CHL totals | | | 192 | 87 | 129 | 216 | 115 | 35 | 18 | 26 | 44 | 13 |

== See also ==
- List of ice hockey players who died during their playing career
- List of people who died in traffic collisions

| Preceded by Jack Valiquette | Toronto Maple Leafs first-round draft pick 1975 | Succeeded by John Anderson |
