= 1976–77 Philadelphia Flyers season =

NHL hockey team season

1976–77 Philadelphia Flyers
- Campbell Conference champions
- Patrick Division champions
- Division: 1st Patrick
- Conference: 1st Campbell
- 1976–77 record: 48–16–16
- Home record: 33–6–1
- Road record: 15–10–15
- Goals for: 323 (2nd)
- Goals against: 213 (3rd)

Team information
- General manager: Keith Allen
- Coach: Fred Shero
- Captain: Bobby Clarke
- Alternate captains: None (Note: The alternate captain position was abolished from the 1975–76 season through the 1984–85 season.)
- Arena: Spectrum
- Average attendance: 17,077
- Minor league affiliates: Springfield Indians; Philadelphia Firebirds

Team leaders
- Goals: Rick MacLeish (49)
- Assists: Bobby Clarke (63)
- Points: Rick MacLeish (97)
- Penalty minutes: Paul Holmgren (201)
- Plus/minus: André Dupont (+57)
- Wins: Bernie Parent (35)
- Goals against average: Wayne Stephenson (2.31)

The 1976–77 Philadelphia Flyers season was the franchise's 10th season in the National Hockey League (NHL). They finished first in the Patrick Division with a record of 48 wins, 16 losses, and 16 ties for 112 points.

== Regular season ==
Dethroned, the heyday of the Broad Street Bullies came to an end, as prior to the 1976–77 season, tough-guy Dave Schultz was traded to the Los Angeles Kings. Despite a slight drop-off in performance, the Flyers dominated the Patrick Division with what proved to be their 4th straight division title.

=== Season standings ===
Patrick Division
	GP	W	L	T	GF	GA	Pts
**Philadelphia Flyers**	80	48	16	16	323	213	112
**New York Islanders**	80	47	21	12	288	193	106
**Atlanta Flames**	80	34	34	12	264	265	80
New York Rangers	80	29	37	14	272	310	72

Note: GP = Games played, W = Wins, L = Losses, T = Ties, Pts = Points, GF = Goals for, GA = Goals against
Note: Teams that qualified for the playoffs are highlighted in bold.

=== Record vs. opponents ===
Patrick Division record vs. opponents

**Vs. Campbell Conference**

**Vs. Wales Conference**

**Vs. Patrick Division**

1976–77 NHL records
Team	**ATL**	**NYI**	**NYR**	**PHI**	**Total**
Atlanta	—	0–6	4–1–1	2–2–2	**6–9–3**
N.Y. Islanders	6–0	—	4–1–1	3–2–1	**13–3–2**
N.Y. Rangers	1–4–1	1–4–1	—	0–2–4	**2–10–6**
Philadelphia	2–2–2	2–3–1	2–0–4	—	**6–5–7**

**Vs. Smythe Division**

1976–77 NHL records
Team	**CHI**	**COL**	**MIN**	**STL**	**VAN**	**Total**
Atlanta	3–2	3–1–1	2–1–2	4–1	1–3–1	**13–8–4**
N.Y. Islanders	3–1–1	5–0	3–1–1	3–1–1	4–1	**18–4–3**
N.Y. Rangers	2–2–1	3–1–1	5–0	2–2–1	3–2	**15–7–3**
Philadelphia	3–0–2	5–0	3–0–2	5–0	4–0–1	**20–0–5**

**Vs. Adams Division**

1976–77 NHL records
Team	**BOS**	**BUF**	**CLE**	**TOR**	**Total**
Atlanta	2–2	1–2–1	1–2–1	1–4	**5–10–2**
N.Y. Islanders	2–1–1	3–1–1	3–0–1	1–2–1	**9–4–4**
N.Y. Rangers	0–4–1	0–4	3–0–1	2–1–1	**5–9–3**
Philadelphia	3–1	2–2	3–1–1	2–1–1	**10–5–2**

**Vs. Norris Division**

1976–77 NHL records
Team	**DET**	**LAK**	**MTL**	**PIT**	**WSH**	**Total**
Atlanta	2–1–1	2–2	0–3–1	3–0–1	3–1	**10–7–3**
N.Y. Islanders	2–2	2–2	0–4	2–2	1–0–3	**7–10–3**
N.Y. Rangers	3–1	0–3–1	1–3	1–2–1	2–2	**7–11–2**
Philadelphia	3–1	4–0	0–4	3–1	2–0–2	**12–6–2**

== Playoffs ==
After disposing of Toronto—after which series Toronto coach Red Kelly claimed "I don't think I'd call [Bobby] Clarke dirty—mean is a better word"—in six games, the Flyers found themselves in the semifinals for the fifth consecutive season. Pitted against Boston, the Flyers lost Games 1 and 2 at home in overtime and would not return home as they were swept in four straight games.

== Schedule and results ==
=== Regular season ===
1976–77 regular season
October: 7–3–2, 16 points (home: 7–2–0; road: 0–1–2)

Game	Date	Score	Opponent	Decision	Record	Points	Recap
1	October 7	0–3	New York Islanders	Parent	0–1–0	0	L
2	October 9	3–4	@ Atlanta Flames	Parent	0–2–0	0	L
3	October 10	1–0	Los Angeles Kings	Parent	1–2–0	2	W
4	October 14	1–7	Montreal Canadiens	Parent	1–3–0	2	L
5	October 16	5–5	@ Toronto Maple Leafs	Inness	1–3–1	3	T
6	October 17	7–4	Detroit Red Wings	Inness	2–3–1	5	W
7	October 21	5–1	Chicago Black Hawks	Parent	3–3–1	7	W
8	October 23	3–2	Buffalo Sabres	Parent	4–3–1	9	W
9	October 24	5–3	Colorado Rockies	Parent	5–3–1	11	W
10	October 28	3–0	Pittsburgh Penguins	Parent	6–3–1	13	W
11	October 30	3–3	@ New York Islanders	Parent	6–3–2	14	T
12	October 31	9–1	Minnesota North Stars	Parent	7–3–2	16	W

November: 5–4–2, 12 points (home: 4–0–1; road: 1–4–1)

Game	Date	Score	Opponent	Decision	Record	Points	Recap
13	November 4	2–3	@ Detroit Red Wings	Parent	7–4–2	16	L
14	November 5	4–6	@ Cleveland Barons	Parent	7–5–2	16	L
15	November 7	3–5	@ Buffalo Sabres	Parent	7–6–2	16	L
16	November 10	2–2	@ Chicago Black Hawks	Parent	7–6–3	17	T
17	November 11	6–4	Vancouver Canucks	Parent	8–6–3	19	W
18	November 13	0–1	@ Pittsburgh Penguins	Parent	8–7–3	19	L
19	November 16	2–0	Detroit Red Wings	Parent	9–7–3	21	W
20	November 21	6–5	Atlanta Flames	Parent	10–7–3	23	W
21	November 24	2–2	New York Rangers	Parent	10–7–4	24	T
22	November 26	4–2	@ Colorado Rockies	Parent	11–7–4	26	W
23	November 28	5–3	New York Islanders	Parent	12–7–4	28	W

December: 10–0–4, 24 points (home: 6–0–0; road: 4–0–4)

Game	Date	Score	Opponent	Decision	Record	Points	Recap
24	December 1	2–2	@ Minnesota North Stars	Parent	12–7–5	29	T
25	December 3	4–4	@ Washington Capitals	Parent	12–7–6	30	T
26	December 5	6–2	Cleveland Barons	Parent	13–7–6	32	W
27	December 9	3–1	@ Boston Bruins	Parent	14–7–6	34	W
28	December 11	4–3	Boston Bruins	Parent	15–7–6	36	W
29	December 12	7–4	Toronto Maple Leafs	Parent	16–7–6	38	W
30	December 14	3–3	@ Minnesota North Stars	Inness	16–7–7	39	T
31	December 16	4–1	Chicago Black Hawks	Parent	17–7–7	41	W
32	December 18	2–0	@ St. Louis Blues	Parent	18–7–7	43	W
33	December 19	4–3	Colorado Rockies	Stephenson	19–7–7	45	W
34	December 22	3–3	@ New York Rangers	Parent	19–7–8	46	T
35	December 23	5–2	Washington Capitals	Stephenson	20–7–8	48	W
36	December 27	5–1	@ Vancouver Canucks	Parent	21–7–8	50	W
37	December 30	2–0	@ Los Angeles Kings	Stephenson	22–7–8	52	W

January: 7–3–4, 18 points (home: 4–1–0; road: 3–2–4)

Game	Date	Score	Opponent	Decision	Record	Points	Recap
38	January 1	7–2	@ Cleveland Barons	Parent	23–7–8	54	W
39	January 3	4–6	@ Montreal Canadiens	Parent	23–8–8	54	L
40	January 5	4–4	@ New York Rangers	Stephenson	23–8–9	55	T
41	January 6	7–1	St. Louis Blues	Parent	24–8–9	57	W
42	January 8	6–1	Los Angeles Kings	Stephenson	25–8–9	59	W
43	January 10	3–8	@ New York Islanders	Parent	25–9–9	59	L
44	January 15	5–2	Colorado Rockies	Parent	26–9–9	61	W
45	January 16	4–2	Minnesota North Stars	Parent	27–9–9	63	W
46	January 20	2–6	Montreal Canadiens	Parent	27–10–9	63	L
47	January 22	4–4	@ Atlanta Flames	Parent	27–10–10	64	T
48	January 23	2–2	@ Chicago Black Hawks	Parent	27–10–11	65	T
49	January 27	2–0	@ St. Louis Blues	Stephenson	28–10–11	67	W
50	January 29	5–2	@ Pittsburgh Penguins	Parent	29–10–11	69	W
51	January 30	5–5	@ Washington Capitals	Parent	29–10–12	70	T

February: 9–3–0, 18 points (home: 6–0–0; road: 3–3–0)

Game	Date	Score	Opponent	Decision	Record	Points	Recap
52	February 3	6–0	Chicago Black Hawks	Parent	30–10–12	72	W
53	February 5	7–5	@ Toronto Maple Leafs	Stephenson	31–10–12	74	W
54	February 7	7–4	Atlanta Flames	Parent	32–10–12	76	W
55	February 10	9–2	Washington Capitals	Parent	33–10–12	78	W
56	February 12	1–2	@ New York Islanders	Parent	33–11–12	78	L
57	February 14	6–4	St. Louis Blues	Stephenson	34–11–12	80	W
58	February 17	7–1	New York Rangers	Parent	35–11–12	82	W
59	February 19	2–5	@ Montreal Canadiens	Parent	35–12–12	82	L
60	February 20	4–2	Buffalo Sabres	Parent	36–12–12	84	W
61	February 24	0–2	@ Buffalo Sabres	Parent	36–13–12	84	L
62	February 26	5–1	@ St. Louis Blues	Parent	37–13–12	86	W
63	February 27	4–3	@ Colorado Rockies	Stephenson	38–13–12	88	W

March: 9–3–3, 21 points (home: 5–3–0; road: 4–0–3)

Game	Date	Score	Opponent	Decision	Record	Points	Recap
64	March 1	5–2	@ Minnesota North Stars	Parent	39–13–12	90	W
65	March 3	5–2	Vancouver Canucks	Parent	40–13–12	92	W
66	March 5	4–1	@ Detroit Red Wings	Stephenson	41–13–12	94	W
67	March 7	2–4	Toronto Maple Leafs	Stephenson	41–14–12	94	L
68	March 10	7–2	Cleveland Barons	Stephenson	42–14–12	96	W
69	March 12	1–3	Boston Bruins	Stephenson	42–15–12	96	L
70	March 13	4–0	Pittsburgh Penguins	Stephenson	43–15–12	98	W
71	March 16	4–4	@ New York Rangers	Stephenson	43–15–13	99	T
72	March 17	1–4	Atlanta Flames	Stephenson	43–16–13	99	L
73	March 19	5–3	@ Los Angeles Kings	Parent	44–16–13	101	W
74	March 22	4–4	@ Vancouver Canucks	Parent	44–16–14	102	T
75	March 24	6–2	@ Boston Bruins	Parent	45–16–14	104	W
76	March 26	9–3	Vancouver Canucks	Parent	46–16–14	106	W
77	March 29	3–1	New York Islanders	Parent	47–16–14	108	W
78	March 30	3–3	@ Cleveland Barons	Parent	47–16–15	109	T

April: 1–0–1, 3 points (home: 1–0–0; road: 0–0–1)

Game	Date	Score	Opponent	Decision	Record	Points	Recap
79	April 2	4–1	New York Rangers	Stephenson	48–16–15	111	W
80	April 3	3–3	@ Atlanta Flames	Parent	48–16–16	112	T

Legend: W Win (2 points) L Loss (0 points) T Tie (1 point)

=== Playoffs ===
1977 Stanley Cup playoffs
Quarterfinals vs. Toronto Maple Leafs – Flyers win 4–2

Game	Date	Score	Opponent	Decision	Series	Recap
1	April 11	2–3	Toronto Maple Leafs	Parent	Maple Leafs lead 1–0	L
2	April 13	1–4	Toronto Maple Leafs	Parent	Maple Leafs lead 2–0	L
3	April 15	4–3 OT	@ Toronto Maple Leafs	Stephenson	Maple Leafs lead 2–1	W
4	April 17	6–5 OT	@ Toronto Maple Leafs	Stephenson	Series tied 2–2	W
5	April 19	2–0	Toronto Maple Leafs	Stephenson	Flyers lead 3–2	W
6	April 21	4–3	@ Toronto Maple Leafs	Stephenson	Flyers win 4–2	W

Semifinals vs. Boston Bruins – Bruins win 4–0

Game	Date	Score	Opponent	Decision	Series	Recap
1	April 24	3–4 OT	Boston Bruins	Parent	Bruins lead 1–0	L
2	April 26	4–5 2OT	Boston Bruins	Stephenson	Bruins lead 2–0	L
3	April 28	1–2	@ Boston Bruins	Stephenson	Bruins lead 3–0	L
4	May 1	0–3	@ Boston Bruins	Stephenson	Bruins win 4–0	L

Legend: W Win L Loss

== Player statistics ==
=== Scoring ===
- Position abbreviations: C = Center; D = Defense; G = Goaltender; LW = Left wing; RW = Right wing
- † = Joined team via a transaction (e.g., trade, waivers, signing) during the season. Stats reflect time with the Flyers only.
- ‡ = Left team via a transaction (e.g., trade, waivers, release) during the season. Stats reflect time with the Flyers only.

No.	Player	Pos	Regular season						Playoffs					
No.	Player	Pos	GP	G	A	Pts	+/-	PIM	GP	G	A	Pts	+/-	PIM
19	Rick MacLeish	C	80	49	48	97	46	42	10	4	9	13	1	2
16	Bobby Clarke	C	80	27	63	90	39	71	10	5	5	10	0	8
12	Gary Dornhoefer	RW	79	25	34	59	47	85	9	1	0	1	1	22
10	Mel Bridgman	C	70	19	38	57	35	120	7	1	0	1	0	8
18	Ross Lonsberry	LW	75	23	32	55	42	43	10	1	2	3	−2	29
7	Bill Barber	LW	73	20	35	55	32	62	10	1	4	5	−1	2
3	Tom Bladon	D	80	10	43	53	34	39	10	1	3	4	−4	4
26	Orest Kindrachuk	C	78	15	36	51	22	79	10	2	1	3	1	0
27	Reggie Leach	RW	77	32	14	46	6	23	10	4	5	9	2	0
9	Bob Kelly	LW	73	22	24	46	27	117	10	0	1	1	−2	18
11	Don Saleski	RW	74	22	16	38	24	33	10	0	0	0	−3	12
14	Joe Watson	D	77	4	26	30	29	39	10	0	0	0	−5	2
6	Andre Dupont	D	59	10	19	29	57	168	10	1	1	2	−4	35
17	Paul Holmgren	RW	59	14	12	26	10	201	10	1	1	2	−2	25
20	Jimmy Watson	D	71	3	23	26	34	35	10	1	2	3	6	2
22	Harvey Bennett†	C	51	12	8	20	−9	60	4	0	0	0	0	2
2	Bob Dailey†	D	32	5	14	19	16	38	10	4	9	13	11	15
5	Larry Goodenough‡	D	32	4	13	17	15	21	—	—	—	—	—	—
25	Terry Murray‡	D	36	0	13	13	21	14	—	—	—	—	—	—
5	Rick Lapointe†	D	22	1	8	9	20	39	10	0	0	0	−5	7
37	Al Hill†	LW	9	2	4	6	6	27	—	—	—	—	—	—
29	Jack McIlhargey‡	D	40	2	1	3	6	164	—	—	—	—	—	—
23	Bill Collins‡	RW	9	1	1	2	−1	4	—	—	—	—	—	—
28	Drew Callander	C	2	1	0	1	1	0	—	—	—	—	—	—
30	Gary Inness	G	6	0	1	1		0	—	—	—	—	—	—
4	Mark Suzor	D	4	0	1	1	2	4	—	—	—	—	—	—
23	Norm Barnes	D	1	0	0	0	0	0	—	—	—	—	—	—
15	Terry Crisp	C	2	0	0	0	0	0	—	—	—	—	—	—
21	John Paddock	RW	5	0	0	0	0	9	—	—	—	—	—	—
1	Bernie Parent	G	61	0	0	0		0	3	0	0	0		0
31	Bob Ritchie‡	LW	1	0	0	0	0	0	—	—	—	—	—	—
35	Wayne Stephenson	G	21	0	0	0		4	9	0	0	0		2

=== Goaltending ===
No.	Player	Regular season											Playoffs									
No.	Player	GP	GS	W	L	T	SA	GA	GAA	SV%	SO	TOI	GP	GS	W	L	SA	GA	GAA	SV%	SO	TOI
1	Bernie Parent	61	61	35	13	12	1582	159	2.71	.899	5	3,520	3	2	0	3	43	8	3.95	.814	0	122
35	Wayne Stephenson	21	17	12	3	2	472	41	2.31	.913	3	1,064	9	8	4	3	238	23	2.61	.903	1	530
30	Gary Inness	6	2	1	0	2	89	9	2.57	.899	0	210	—	—	—	—	—	—	—	—	—	—

== Awards and records ==
=== Awards ===
Type	Award/honor	Recipient	Ref
League (in-season)	NHL All-Star Game selection	Tom Bladon	
League (in-season)	NHL All-Star Game selection	Bobby Clarke	
League (in-season)	NHL All-Star Game selection	Gary Dornhoefer	
League (in-season)	NHL All-Star Game selection	Rick MacLeish	
League (in-season)	NHL All-Star Game selection	Bernie Parent	
League (in-season)	NHL All-Star Game selection	Fred Shero (coach)	
League (in-season)	NHL All-Star Game selection	Jim Watson	
League (in-season)	NHL All-Star Game selection	Joe Watson	
Team	Barry Ashbee Trophy	André Dupont	
Team	Class Guy Award	Gary Dornhoefer	

=== Records ===
Among the records set during the 1976–77 season was rookie Al Hill setting the league record for most points by a player in his NHL debut, scoring two goals and three assists on February 14 against the St. Louis Blues. The Flyers set a league record for most road ties in a season (15) and a team record for fewest home ties (1). During the playoffs, Rick MacLeish tied a team record for most assists during a single period (3) on April 24. Two days later the Flyers played the longest home game in team history (90 minutes and 7 seconds), losing 5–4 to the Boston Bruins midway through the second overtime period.

=== Milestones ===
Milestone	Player	Date	Ref
First game	Bob Ritchie	February 5, 1977	
First game	Drew Callander	February 7, 1977	
First game	Al Hill	February 14, 1977	
First game	Mark Suzor	March 10, 1977	
First game	Norm Barnes	March 12, 1977	

== Transactions ==
The Flyers were involved in the following transactions from May 17, 1976, the day after the deciding game of the 1976 Stanley Cup Final, through May 14, 1977, the day of the deciding game of the 1977 Stanley Cup Final.

=== Trades ===
Date	Details		Ref
September 29, 1976	To Philadelphia Flyers: Future considerations (Note: The Flyers later received a 1977 4th-round pick and a 1978 2nd-round pick.)	To Los Angeles Kings: Dave Schultz	
November 24, 1976	To Philadelphia Flyers: Harvey Bennett	To Washington Capitals: cash	
December 4, 1976	To Philadelphia Flyers: cash	To Washington Capitals: Bill Collins	
January 20, 1977	To Philadelphia Flyers: Bob Dailey	To Vancouver Canucks: Larry Goodenough; Jack McIlhargey	
February 17, 1977	To Philadelphia Flyers: Mike Korney; Rick Lapointe	To Detroit Red Wings: Steve Coates; Dave Kelly; Terry Murray; Bob Ritchie	

=== Players acquired ===
Date	Player	Former team	Via	Ref
October 20, 1976	Bill Collins	New York Rangers	Free agency	
October 22, 1976	Al Hill	Victoria Cougars (WCHL)	Free agency	

=== Players lost ===
Date	Player	New team	Via	Ref
N/A	Serge Lajeunesse		Retirement	
N/A	Larry Wright	Dusseldorfer EG (Bundesliga)	Free agency	
November 16, 1976	Wayne Stephenson		Retirement (Note: Stephenson un-retired and returned to the team on December 7, 1976.)	

=== Signings ===
Date	Player	Term	Ref
June 16, 1976	Drew Callander	multi-year	
June 16, 1976	Craig Hanmer	multi-year	
June 16, 1976	Dave Hynek	multi-year	
June 16, 1976	Mark Suzor	multi-year	

== Draft picks ==
Philadelphia's picks at the 1976 NHL amateur draft, which was held at the NHL's office in Montreal, on June 1, 1976.

Round	Pick	Player	Position	Nationality	Team (league)
1	17	Mark Suzor	Defense	Canada	Kingston Canadians (OHA)
2	35	Drew Callander	Center	Canada	Regina Pats (WCHL)
3	53	Craig Hanmer	Defense	United States	Mohawk Valley Comets (NAHL)
4	71	Dave Hynek	Defense	Canada	Kingston Canadians (OHA)
5	89	Robin Lang	Defense	Canada	Cornell University (ECAC)
6	107	Paul Klasinski	Left wing	United States	St. Paul Vulcans (MJHL)
7	117	Ray Kurpis	Right wing	United States	Austin Mavericks (MJHL)

== Farm teams ==
The Flyers were affiliated with the Springfield Indians of the AHL and the Philadelphia Firebirds of the NAHL.
