= William Goodenough (disambiguation) =

William Goodenough (1867–1945) was a Royal Navy officer.

William Goodenough may also refer to:

- Bill Goodenough (1863–1905), American baseball player
- Sir William Goodenough, 1st Baronet (1899–1951), banker, of the Goodenough baronets
- Sir William McLernon Goodenough, 3rd Baronet (born 1954), of the Goodenough baronets
- William Howley Goodenough (1833–1898), British Army officer
- William Goodenough (priest) (1772–1854), Archdeacon of Carlisle

== See also ==
- Goodenough (disambiguation)
