= Goodenough =

Goodenough may refer to:

== Places ==
- Goodenough College, London, England
- Goodenough Island, Papua New Guinean island
- Cape Goodenough, Antarctica

== People ==
- Goodenough baronets (created 1943)
- Amanda Goodenough American interactive storyteller
- Edmund Goodenough (1786–1845), English churchman
- Erwin Ramsdell Goodenough (1893–1965), American academic
- Florence Goodenough (1886–1959), American psychologist
- Frederick Goodenough (1866–1934), English banker
- Ian Goodenough (born 1975), Australian politician
- James Graham Goodenough (1830–1875), Royal Navy officer
- John B. Goodenough (1922–2023), American physicist/chemist and Nobel laureate, known for developing the Li-ion rechargeable battery
- Larry Goodenough (born 1953), Canadian ice hockey player
- Samuel Goodenough (1743–1827), English scientist, Bishop of Carlisle
- Ursula Goodenough (born 1943), American biologist
- William Goodenough (1867–1945), Royal Navy admiral
- Ward Goodenough (1919–2013), American anthropologist

== See also ==
- Good Enough (disambiguation)
- Goodnough
- Godunov
