= Richard Goodenough =

Richard Goodenough may refer to:

- Richard Goodenough, plotter with Nathaniel Wade
- Sir Richard Edmund Goodenough, 2nd Baronet (1925–1996), of the Goodenough baronets
