= 33rd National Hockey League All-Star Game =

Professional ice hockey exhibition game

33rd NHL All-Star Game
	1	2	3	Total
Campbell	2	1	1	4
Wales	0	0	1	1
- Date: February 10, 1981
- Arena: The Forum
- City: Inglewood
- MVP: Mike Liut (St. Louis)
- Attendance: 15,761

The 33rd National Hockey League All-Star Game was held in The Forum in Inglewood, home to the Los Angeles Kings, on February 10, 1981.

== Game summary ==
	Campbell Conference	Wales Conference
Final score	4	1
Head coach	(Canada) Pat Quinn (Philadelphia Flyers)	(Canada) Scotty Bowman (Buffalo Sabres)
Lineup	Starting Lineup: (Canada) 1 - G Mike Liut (St. Louis Blues); (Canada) 4 - D Rob Ramage (Colorado Rockies); (Canada) 5 - D Denis Potvin (New York Islanders); (Canada) 7 - LW Bill Barber (Philadelphia Flyers, captain); (Sweden) 15 - C Kent Nilsson (Calgary Flames); (United States) 17 - RW Paul Holmgren (Philadelphia Flyers); Reserves: (Canada) 2 - D Bob Dailey (Philadelphia Flyers); (Canada) 3 - D Behn Wilson (Philadelphia Flyers); (Canada) 6 - D Bob Murray (Chicago Black Hawks); (Canada) 10 - RW Wayne Babych (St. Louis Blues); (Canada) 11 - RW Mike Gartner (Washington Capitals); (Canada) 12 - LW Morris Lukowich (Winnipeg Jets); (Canada) 14 - LW Bob Bourne (New York Islanders); (Canada) 18 - RW Eddie Johnstone (New York Rangers); (Canada) 22 - LW Dave "Tiger" Williams (Vancouver Canucks); (Canada) 23 - RW Mike Bossy (New York Islanders); (Canada) 24 - C Bernie Federko (St. Louis Blues); (Canada) 25 - D Kevin McCarthy (Vancouver Canucks); (Canada) 33 - G Pete Peeters (Philadelphia Flyers); (Canada) 99 - C Wayne Gretzky (Edmonton Oilers)	Starting Lineup: (United States) 2 - D Rod Langway (Montreal Canadiens); (Canada) 11 - LW Charlie Simmer (Los Angeles Kings); (Canada) 16 - C Marcel Dionne (Los Angeles Kings, captain); (Canada) 18 - RW Dave Taylor (Los Angeles Kings); (United States) 28 - D Reed Larson (Detroit Red Wings); (Canada) 33 - G Don Beaupre (Minnesota North Stars); Reserves: (Canada) 1 - G Mario Lessard (Los Angeles Kings); (Canada) 4 - D Robert Picard (Toronto Maple Leafs); (United States) 5 - D Mark Howe (Hartford Whalers); (Canada) 7 - D Ray Bourque (Boston Bruins); (Canada) 12 - RW Rick Middleton (Boston Bruins); (Canada) 14 - RW Rick Kehoe (Pittsburgh Penguins); (Canada) 15 - C Bobby Smith (Minnesota North Stars); (Canada) 17 - C Mike Rogers (Hartford Whalers); (Canada) 20 - RW Danny Gare (Buffalo Sabres); (Canada) 22 - LW Steve Shutt (Montreal Canadiens); (Canada) 23 - LW Bob Gainey (Montreal Canadiens); (Canada) 25 - D Randy Carlyle (Pittsburgh Penguins); (Czechoslovakia) 26 - C Peter Stastny (Quebec Nordiques); (Canada) 27 - LW John Ogrodnick (Detroit Red Wings)
Scoring summary	Nilsson (Barber, Holmgren) 0:45 1st; Barber (Johnstone) 8:06 1st (Shorthanded); Babych (Johnstone, Federko) 16:12 2nd; Wilson (Bossy, Gretzky) 10:18 3rd	Ogrodnick (Howe, Kehoe) 5:13 3rd
Penalties	Bourne 7:47 1st	
Shots	9-8-8 (25)	18-13-12 (43)
Win/loss	Mike Liut	Don Beaupre

Referee : Bryan Lewis

Linesmen : Jim Christison, Gerard Gauthier

- MVP: Mike Liut, St. Louis Blues

== See also ==
- 1980–81 NHL season

== Notes ==
- Bryan Trottier named to Campbell team, but did not play.
