= Don Lever =

Canadian ice hockey player (born 1952)

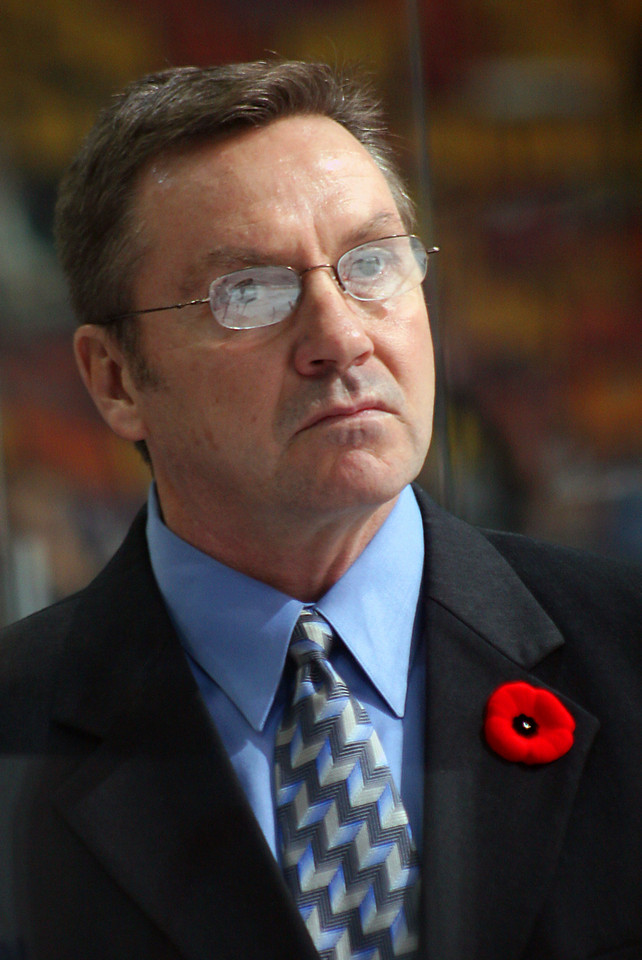
- Born: November 14, 1952 (age 73) South Porcupine, Ontario, Canada
- Height: 5 ft 11 in (180 cm)
- Weight: 185 lb (84 kg; 13 st 3 lb)
- Position: Left wing
- Shot: Left
- Played for: Vancouver Canucks; Atlanta Flames; Calgary Flames; Colorado Rockies; New Jersey Devils; Buffalo Sabres
- National team: Canada
- NHL draft: 3rd overall, 1972; Vancouver Canucks
- Playing career: 1972–1987
Medal record
Representing Canada
Ice hockey
World Championships
Bronze medal – third place	1978 Prague

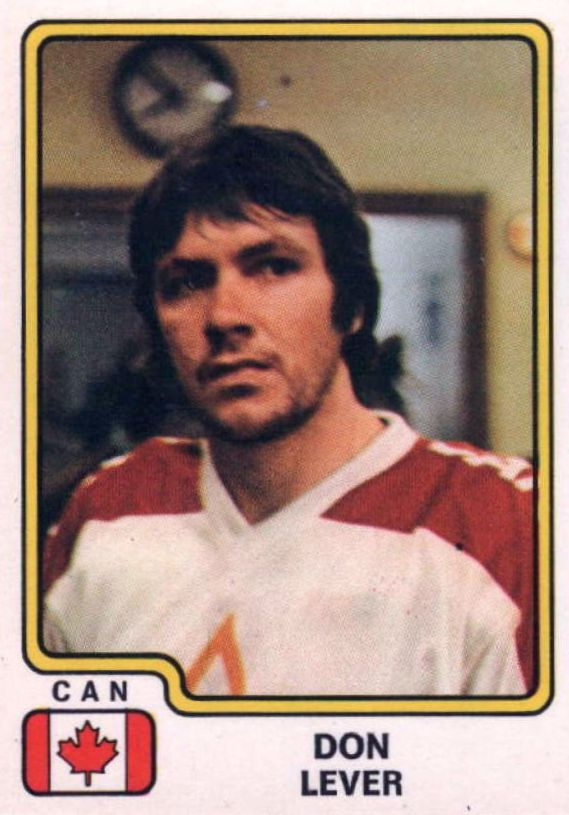
Don Lever with the Team Canada in 1979

Donald Richard Lever (born November 14, 1952) is a Canadian former professional ice hockey left winger who played 15 seasons in the National Hockey League (NHL) from 1972–73 until 1986–87. He notably helped the Calgary Flames reach the NHL playoff semifinals for the first time in club history in 1981.

== Playing career ==
Lever was drafted 3rd overall by the Vancouver Canucks in the 1972 NHL Amateur Draft. The forward reached the 20-goal mark six times in Vancouver and played for Canada at the 1978 World Championships. Lever was traded to the Atlanta Flames alongside Brad Smith in exchange for Ivan Boldirev and Darcy Rota on February 8, 1980. He was later the first captain of the New Jersey Devils. Lever scored the first goal in Devils' history. He was recognized for both his penalty killing and powerplay abilities. Lever played 1020 career NHL games, scoring 313 goals and 367 assists for 680 points. On March 9, 2009, Lever was named an assistant coach for the Montreal Canadiens by Bob Gainey after the firing of Guy Carbonneau. His contract was not renewed, and he was named head coach of the Chicago Wolves of the AHL on October 21, 2009.

== Awards and achievements ==
- 1972: OHA First All-Star Team
- 1972: Red Tilson Trophy (OHA MVP)
- 1982: Played in NHL All-Star Game
- 1990–91: Louis A.R. Pieri Memorial Award
- 2006–07: Head coached the Hamilton Bulldogs to their first franchise Calder Cup, AHL championship

== Career statistics ==
=== Regular season and playoffs ===
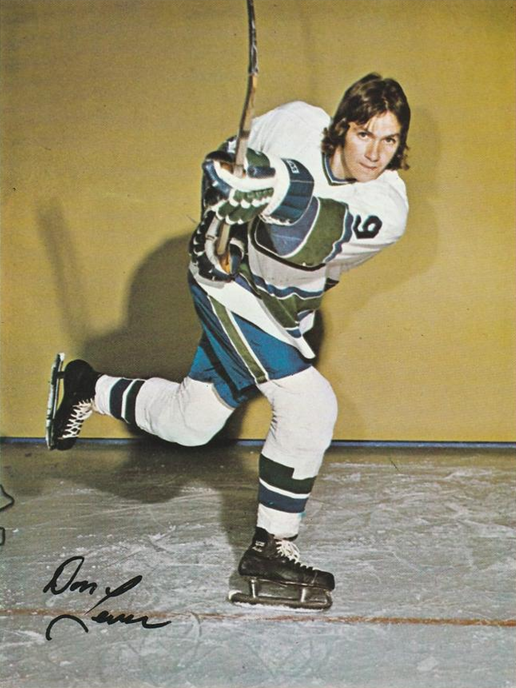
1973 photo of Don Lever for Vancouver Canucks

			Regular season					Playoffs
Season	Team	League	GP	G	A	Pts	PIM	GP	G	A	Pts	PIM
1969–70	Niagara Falls Flyers	OHA-Jr.	2	0	1	1	4	—	—	—	—	—
1970–71	Niagara Falls Flyers	OHA-Jr.	59	35	36	71	112	—	—	—	—	—
1971–72	Niagara Falls Flyers	OHA-Jr.	69	61	65	126	69	6	3	1	4	45
1972–73	Vancouver Canucks	NHL	78	12	26	38	49	—	—	—	—	—
1973–74	Vancouver Canucks	NHL	78	23	25	48	28	—	—	—	—	—
1974–75	Vancouver Canucks	NHL	80	38	30	68	49	5	0	1	1	4
1975–76	Vancouver Canucks	NHL	80	25	40	65	93	2	0	0	0	0
1976–77	Vancouver Canucks	NHL	80	27	30	57	28	—	—	—	—	—
1977–78	Vancouver Canucks	NHL	75	17	32	49	58	—	—	—	—	—
1978–79	Vancouver Canucks	NHL	71	23	21	44	17	3	2	1	3	2
1979–80	Vancouver Canucks	NHL	51	21	17	38	32	—	—	—	—	—
1979–80	Atlanta Flames	NHL	28	14	16	30	4	4	1	1	2	0
1980–81	Calgary Flames	NHL	62	26	31	57	56	16	4	7	11	20
1981–82	Calgary Flames	NHL	23	8	11	19	6	—	—	—	—	—
1981–82	Colorado Rockies	NHL	59	22	28	50	20	—	—	—	—	—
1982–83	New Jersey Devils	NHL	79	23	30	53	68	—	—	—	—	—
1983–84	New Jersey Devils	NHL	70	14	19	33	44	—	—	—	—	—
1984–85	New Jersey Devils	NHL	67	10	8	18	31	—	—	—	—	—
1985–86	Rochester Americans	AHL	29	6	11	17	16	—	—	—	—	—
1985–86	Buffalo Sabres	NHL	29	7	1	8	6	—	—	—	—	—
1986–87	Rochester Americans	AHL	57	29	25	54	69	18	4	3	7	14
1986–87	Buffalo Sabres	NHL	10	3	2	5	4	—	—	—	—	—
NHL totals			1,020	313	367	680	593	30	7	10	17	26

=== International ===
Year	Team	Event	GP	G	A	Pts	PIM
1978	Canada	WC	10	4	3	7	4

== Coaching statistics ==
Season  Team                Lge Type            GP  W  L  T OTL  Pct        Result 
1987–88 Buffalo Sabres      NHL Assistant coach  
1988–89 Buffalo Sabres      NHL Assistant coach 
1990–91 Rochester Americans AHL Head coach      80 45 26  9   0 0.619 Lost in finals 
1991–92 Rochester Americans AHL Head coach      80 37 31 12   0 0.537 Lost in round 3 
1992–93 Buffalo Sabres      NHL Assistant coach 
1993–94 Buffalo Sabres      NHL Assistant coach 
1994–95 Buffalo Sabres      NHL Assistant coach 
1995–96 Buffalo Sabres      NHL Associate coach 
1996–97 Buffalo Sabres      NHL Assistant coach 
1997–98 Buffalo Sabres      NHL Associate coach 
1998–99 Buffalo Sabres      NHL Associate coach 
1999–00 Buffalo Sabres      NHL Associate coach 
2000–01 Buffalo Sabres      NHL Assistant coach 
2001–02 Buffalo Sabres      NHL Assistant coach 
2002–03 St. Louis Blues     NHL Assistant coach 
2003–04 St. Louis Blues     NHL Assistant coach 
2005–06 Hamilton Bulldogs   AHL Head coach      80 35 41 0    4 0.463  Out of playoffs 
2006–07 Hamilton Bulldogs   AHL Head coach      80 43 28 0    9 0.594  Won championship 
2007–08 Hamilton Bulldogs   AHL Head coach      80 36 34 0   10 0.512  Out of playoffs
2008–09 Hamilton Bulldogs   AHL Head coach      65 39 24 0    2 0.615
2008–09 Montreal Canadiens  NHL Assistant coach

== Personal life ==
Lever and his wife Karen have three children, Michael, Sarah, and Caitlin.

== See also ==
- List of NHL players with 1,000 games played

Preceded by Jocelyn Guevremont	Vancouver Canucks first-round draft pick 1972	Succeeded by Dennis Ververgaert
Preceded by Chris Oddleifson	Vancouver Canucks captain 1977–79	Succeeded by Kevin McCarthy
Preceded by Colorado Rockies captains Rob Ramage	New Jersey Devils captain 1982–84	Succeeded by Mel Bridgman
