= 1976–77 Montreal Canadiens season =

NHL hockey team season (won 20th Stanley Cup)

1976–77 Montreal Canadiens
- Stanley Cup champions
- Wales Conference champions
- Norris Division champions
- Division: 1st Norris
- Conference: 1st Wales
- 1976–77 record: 60–8–12
- Home record: 33–1–6
- Road record: 27–7–6
- Goals for: 387
- Goals against: 171

Team information
- General manager: Sam Pollock
- Coach: Scotty Bowman
- Captain: Yvan Cournoyer
- Alternate captains: None
- Arena: Montreal Forum

Team leaders
- Goals: Steve Shutt (60)
- Assists: Guy Lafleur (80)
- Points: Guy Lafleur (136)
- Penalty minutes: Doug Risebrough (132)
- Wins: Ken Dryden (41)
- Goals against average: Michel Larocque (2.09)

The 1976–77 Montreal Canadiens season was the Canadiens' 68th season. The team is regarded to be one of the greatest NHL teams ever composed. The Canadiens won their 20th Stanley Cup in 1976–77, taking the NHL championship. Montreal set new records for most wins (60) and points (132) in a season. Those records were not broken until the re-introduction of regular season overtime (Note: Whereas the 1976–77 Canadiens recorded twelve points for games that ended tied after the third period, under current rules a team earns one point for losses incurred in overtime or a shootout. Notably, the 2022–23 Boston Bruins, who are the current NHL record holders with 65 wins and 135 points, won only 54 games in regulation, winning an additional eleven games and thus recording an additional 11 points in overtime and shootouts.) and the extension of the schedule to 82 games. The 1976–77 Canadiens continue to hold the all-time records for regulation wins (Note: Prior to the 2022–23 Bruins, two other teams had won more than sixty games under an 82-game schedule, these being the 1995–96 Detroit Red Wings (62 wins, 59 in regulation) and the 2018–19 Tampa Bay Lightning (62 wins, 49 in regulation).) as well as points per game (1.650). (Note: The closest any team has come to the 1976–77 Canadiens' 1.650 PpG is the 2022–23 Bruins, who recorded 1.646 PpG.) They outscored their opponents by 216 goals (also a league record), a differential average of 2.7 goals per game. The 1976-77 Canadiens team has been widely regarded as one of the greatest teams in NHL history.

Of the 24 players on the roster, 14 were drafted by the Canadiens: Pierre Bouchard, Rick Chartraw, Brian Engblom, Bob Gainey, Réjean Houle, Guy Lafleur, Michel Larocque, Pierre Mondou, Bill Nyrop, Doug Risebrough, Larry Robinson, Steve Shutt, Mario Tremblay, and Murray Wilson. The only player on the roster not developed by the Canadiens was Pete Mahovlich.

Montreal lost only eight games, a modern-era record that has never been tied or broken even when counting only regulation losses and including lockout and pandemic-shortened seasons. They earned at least a point in 72 games, which also still stands as an all-time record. (Note: The closest any teams have come to this record are the 2022–23 Bruins (who earned a point in 70 games) and the 1995–96 Red Wings (who earned a point in 69 games and also lost one game in overtime, which would have earned a point under current rules.))

The Canadiens earned their 100th point in the 62nd game of the season with a victory over the Atlanta Flames on February 23, 1977. This was an NHL record for fastest team to 100 points for 45 seasons.

== Regular season ==
=== Final standings ===
Norris Division
	GP	W	L	T	GF	GA	Pts
**Montreal Canadiens**	80	60	8	12	387	171	132
**Los Angeles Kings**	80	34	31	15	271	241	83
**Pittsburgh Penguins**	80	34	33	13	240	252	81
Washington Capitals	80	24	42	14	221	307	62
Detroit Red Wings	80	16	55	9	183	309	41

Note: GP = Games played, W = Wins, L = Losses, T = Ties, Pts = Points, GF = Goals for, GA = Goals against
Note: Teams that qualified for the playoffs are highlighted in bold.

=== Record vs. opponents ===
Norris Division record vs. opponents

**Vs. Wales Conference**

**Vs. Campbell Conference**

**Vs. Norris Division**

1976–77 NHL records
Team	**DET**	**LAK**	**MTL**	**PIT**	**WSH**	**Total**
Detroit	—	0–5–1	0–5–1	2–4	0–3–3	**2–17–5**
Los Angeles	5–0–1	—	0–4–2	3–2–1	5–0–1	**13–6–5**
Montreal	5–0–1	4–0–2	—	4–0–2	6–0	**19–0–5**
Pittsburgh	4–2	2–3–1	0–4–2	—	1–4–1	**7–13–4**
Washington	3–0–3	0–5–1	0–6	4–1–1	—	**7–12–5**

**Vs. Adams Division**

1976–77 NHL records
Team	**BOS**	**BUF**	**CLE**	**TOR**	**Total**
Detroit	1–4	1–4	3–2	1–3–1	**6–13–1**
Los Angeles	2–2–1	2–3	2–1–2	1–2–2	**7–8–5**
Montreal	2–3	2–2–1	5–0	2–1–1	**11–6–2**
Pittsburgh	1–3–1	4–0–1	3–0–2	2–1–2	**10–4–6**
Washington	0–4–1	1–4	0–5	3–2	**4–15–1**

**Vs. Patrick Division**

1976–77 NHL records
Team	**ATL**	**NYI**	**NYR**	**PHI**	**Total**
Detroit	1–2–1	2–2	1–3	1–3	**5–10–1**
Los Angeles	2–2	2–2	3–0–1	0–4	**7–8–1**
Montreal	3–0–1	4–0	3–1	4–0	**14–1–1**
Pittsburgh	0–3–1	2–2	2–1–1	1–3	**5–9–2**
Washington	1–3	0–1–3	2–2	0–2–2	**3–8–5**

**Vs. Smythe Division**

1976–77 NHL records
Team	**CHI**	**COL**	**MIN**	**STL**	**VAN**	**Total**
Detroit	0–4	0–4	0–3–1	0–3–1	3–1	**3–15–2**
Los Angeles	2–2	2–0–2	1–3	2–2	0–2–2	**7–9–4**
Montreal	3–0–1	3–0–1	3–0–1	3–1	4–0	**16–1–3**
Pittsburgh	2–2	2–2	3–1	3–1	2–1–1	**12–7–1**
Washington	1–2–1	3–1	1–1–2	3–1	2–2	**10–7–3**

== Schedule and results ==
1976–77 regular season
October

Game	Result	Date	Score	Opponent	Record
1	W	October 7, 1976	10–1	Pittsburgh Penguins (1976–77)	1–0–0
2	W	October 9, 1976	3–0	Vancouver Canucks (1976–77)	2–0–0
3	L	October 10, 1976	1–3	@ Buffalo Sabres (1976–77)	2–1–0
4	W	October 12, 1976	4–2	@ Detroit Red Wings (1976–77)	3–1–0
5	W	October 14, 1976	7–1	@ Philadelphia Flyers (1976–77)	4–1–0
6	W	October 16, 1976	7–4	New York Rangers (1976–77)	5–1–0
7	L	October 17, 1976	3–5	@ Boston Bruins (1976–77)	5–2–0
8	W	October 19, 1976	6–0	@ Washington Capitals (1976–77)	6–2–0
9	W	October 21, 1976	5–3	Toronto Maple Leafs (1976–77)	7–2–0
10	W	October 23, 1976	9–1	@ Pittsburgh Penguins (1976–77)	8–2–0
11	W	October 25, 1976	4–1	New York Islanders (1976–77)	9–2–0
12	T	October 27, 1976	4–4	@ Chicago Black Hawks (1976–77)	9–2–1
13	L	October 30, 1976	3–4	Boston Bruins (1976–77)	9–3–1

November

Game	Result	Date	Score	Opponent	Record
14	W	November 1, 1976	3–2	Buffalo Sabres (1976–77)	10–3–1
15	W	November 3, 1976	5–2	@ Minnesota North Stars (1976–77)	11–3–1
16	W	November 6, 1976	11–3	Chicago Black Hawks (1976–77)	12–3–1
17	W	November 9, 1976	8–1	@ St. Louis Blues (1976–77)	13–3–1
18	T	November 10, 1976	2–2	@ Atlanta Flames (1976–77)	13–3–2
19	T	November 13, 1976	3–3	Colorado Rockies (1976–77)	13–3–3
20	W	November 15, 1976	4–2	St. Louis Blues (1976–77)	14–3–3
21	L	November 17, 1976	0–1	@ Toronto Maple Leafs (1976–77)	14–4–3
22	W	November 19, 1976	6–3	Minnesota North Stars (1976–77)	15–4–3
23	W	November 21, 1976	9–5	Toronto Maple Leafs (1976–77)	16–4–3
24	W	November 23, 1976	5–1	@ New York Islanders (1976–77)	17–4–3
25	W	November 24, 1976	8–1	@ Cleveland Barons (1976–77)	18–4–3
26	W	November 27, 1976	4–3	@ Los Angeles Kings (1976–77)	19–4–3

December

Game	Result	Date	Score	Opponent	Record
27	T	December 2, 1976	3–3	Los Angeles Kings (1976–77)	19–4–4
28	W	December 4, 1976	3–1	Pittsburgh Penguins (1976–77)	20–4–4
29	W	December 6, 1976	1–0	Cleveland Barons (1976–77)	21–4–4
30	W	December 8, 1976	4–3	@ Chicago Black Hawks (1976–77)	22–4–4
31	W	December 11, 1976	5–0	Detroit Red Wings (1976–77)	23–4–4
32	L	December 12, 1976	2–5	@ New York Rangers (1976–77)	23–5–4
33	W	December 15, 1976	8–2	@ Colorado Rockies (1976–77)	24–5–4
34	W	December 18, 1976	2–0	@ Los Angeles Kings (1976–77)	25–5–4
35	W	December 20, 1976	5–4	@ Vancouver Canucks (1976–77)	26–5–4
36	W	December 27, 1976	4–2	Cleveland Barons (1976–77)	27–5–4
37	T	December 29, 1976	3–3	@ Pittsburgh Penguins (1976–77)	27–5–5
38	T	December 30, 1976	5–5	Minnesota North Stars (1976–77)	27–5–6

January

Game	Result	Date	Score	Opponent	Record
39	W	January 2, 1977	7–0	Atlanta Flames (1976–77)	28–5–6
40	W	January 3, 1977	6–4	Philadelphia Flyers (1976–77)	29–5–6
41	W	January 6, 1977	9–2	@ Buffalo Sabres (1976–77)	30–5–6
42	W	January 8, 1977	7–2	Washington Capitals (1976–77)	31–5–6
43	W	January 11, 1977	6–0	@ Colorado Rockies (1976–77)	32–5–6
44	L	January 12, 1977	2–7	@ St. Louis Blues (1976–77)	32–6–6
45	W	January 15, 1977	6–0	Los Angeles Kings (1976–77)	33–6–6
46	L	January 17, 1977	3–7	@ Boston Bruins (1976–77)	33–7–6
47	W	January 18, 1977	3–0	@ Washington Capitals (1976–77)	34–7–6
48	W	January 20, 1977	6–2	@ Philadelphia Flyers (1976–77)	35–7–6
49	W	January 22, 1977	5–2	Washington Capitals (1976–77)	36–7–6
50	T	January 23, 1977	2–2	Detroit Red Wings (1976–77)	36–7–7
51	T	January 29, 1977	3–3	Buffalo Sabres (1976–77)	36–7–8
52	W	January 30, 1977	2–1	New York Islanders (1976–77)	37–7–8

February

Game	Result	Date	Score	Opponent	Record
53	W	February 1, 1977	7–3	@ Cleveland Barons (1976–77)	38–7–8
54	W	February 3, 1977	6–4	@ Vancouver Canucks (1976–77)	39–7–8
55	T	February 5, 1977	3–3	@ Los Angeles Kings (1976–77)	39–7–9
56	W	February 9, 1977	6–0	Vancouver Canucks (1976–77)	40–7–9
57	W	February 12, 1977	8–3	Boston Bruins (1976–77)	41–7–9
58	W	February 13, 1977	5–3	@ Detroit Red Wings (1976–77)	42–7–9
59	T	February 16, 1977	4–4	@ Pittsburgh Penguins (1976–77)	42–7–10
60	W	February 19, 1977	5–2	Philadelphia Flyers (1976–77)	43–7–10
61	W	February 21, 1977	3–2	Atlanta Flames (1976–77)	44–7–10
62	W	February 23, 1977	4–2	@ Atlanta Flames (1976–77)	45–7–10
63	W	February 26, 1977	5–3	Cleveland Barons (1976–77)	46–7–10
64	W	February 27, 1977	8–1	@ New York Rangers (1976–77)	47–7–10

March

Game	Result	Date	Score	Opponent	Record
65	W	March 1, 1977	5–4	@ New York Islanders (1976–77)	48–7–10
66	W	March 3, 1977	5–1	Pittsburgh Penguins (1976–77)	49–7–10
67	W	March 5, 1977	7–2	New York Rangers (1976–77)	50–7–10
68	L	March 6, 1977	1–4	@ Buffalo Sabres (1976–77)	50–8–10
69	T	March 9, 1977	2–2	@ Toronto Maple Leafs (1976–77)	50–8–11
70	W	March 10, 1977	7–1	Colorado Rockies (1976–77)	51–8–11
71	W	March 12, 1977	5–1	Chicago Black Hawks (1976–77)	52–8–11
72	W	March 14, 1977	3–0	Los Angeles Kings (1976–77)	53–8–11
73	W	March 16, 1977	5–2	@ Minnesota North Stars (1976–77)	54–8–11
74	W	March 21, 1977	5–1	@ Boston Bruins (1976–77)	55–8–11
75	W	March 24, 1977	6–1	St. Louis Blues (1976–77)	56–8–11
76	W	March 26, 1977	4–0	Detroit Red Wings (1976–77)	57–8–11
77	W	March 27, 1977	6–0	@ Detroit Red Wings (1976–77)	58–8–11
78	T	March 30, 1977	3–3	Toronto Maple Leafs (1976–77)	58–8–12

April

Game	Result	Date	Score	Opponent	Record
79	W	April 2, 1977	11–0	Washington Capitals (1976–77)	59–8–12
80	W	April 3, 1977	2–1	@ Washington Capitals (1976–77)	60–8–12

Legend: Win (2 points) Loss (0 points) Tie (1 point)

== Playoffs ==
=== Stanley Cup Finals ===
Jacques Lemaire scored three game-winning goals, including the Cup winner in overtime. Guy Lafleur won the Conn Smythe Trophy for scoring 9 goals and 17 assists during the playoffs.

==== Boston Bruins vs. Montreal Canadiens ====
Date	Visitors	Score	Home	Score	Notes
May 7	Boston	3	Montreal	7	
May 10	Boston	0	Montreal	3	
May 12	Montreal	4	Boston	2	
May 14	Montreal	2	Boston	1	OT

Montreal wins the series 4–0. Guy Lafleur won the Conn Smythe Trophy as playoff MVP.

== Player statistics ==
=== Regular season ===
==== Scoring ====
Player	Pos	GP	G	A	Pts	PIM	+/-	PPG	SHG	GWG
Guy Lafleur	RW	80	56	80	136	20	89	14	0	8
Steve Shutt	LW	80	60	45	105	28	88	8	0	9
Larry Robinson	D	77	19	66	85	45	120	3	0	3
Guy Lapointe	D	77	25	51	76	53	69	10	0	6
Jacques Lemaire	C	75	34	41	75	22	70	5	2	4
Pete Mahovlich	C	76	15	47	62	45	36	3	0	1
Doug Risebrough	C	78	22	38	60	132	33	1	0	6
Yvan Cournoyer	RW	60	25	28	53	8	27	6	0	2
Yvon Lambert	LW	79	24	28	52	50	30	2	0	5
Rejean Houle	W	65	22	30	52	24	39	2	0	3
Mario Tremblay	RW	74	18	28	46	61	25	4	0	3
Serge Savard	D	78	9	33	42	35	79	0	0	1
Doug Jarvis	C	80	16	22	38	14	30	0	0	2
Bob Gainey	LW	80	14	19	33	41	31	0	1	3
Murray Wilson	LW	60	13	14	27	26	25	1	0	1
Bill Nyrop	D	74	3	19	22	21	42	0	0	1
Jim Roberts	D/RW	45	5	14	19	18	22	0	1	1
Pierre Bouchard	D	73	4	11	15	52	33	0	1	0
Rick Chartraw	D/RW	43	3	4	7	59	27	0	0	1
Ken Dryden	G	56	0	2	2	0	0	0	0	0
John Van Boxmeer	D	4	0	1	1	0	1	0	0	0
Michel Larocque	G	26	0	0	0	0	0	0	0	0

==== Goaltending ====
Player	MIN	GP	W	L	T	GA	GAA	SO
Ken Dryden	3275	56	41	6	8	117	2.14	10
Michel Larocque	1525	26	19	2	4	53	2.09	4
Team:	4800	80	60	8	12	170	2.12	14

=== Playoffs ===
==== Scoring ====
Player	Pos	GP	G	A	Pts	PIM	PPG	SHG	GWG
Guy Lafleur	RW	14	9	17	26	6	1	0	2
Jacques Lemaire	C	14	7	12	19	6	1	0	3
Steve Shutt	LW	14	8	10	18	2	2	0	3
Guy Lapointe	D	12	3	9	12	4	1	0	0
Larry Robinson	D	14	2	10	12	12	1	0	0
Pete Mahovlich	C	13	4	5	9	19	2	0	1
Serge Savard	D	14	2	7	9	2	1	0	1
Murray Wilson	LW	14	1	6	7	14	0	0	0
Doug Jarvis	C	14	0	7	7	2	0	0	0
Yvon Lambert	LW	14	3	3	6	12	1	0	0
Bob Gainey	LW	14	4	1	5	25	0	1	1
Doug Risebrough	C	12	2	3	5	16	0	0	0
Jim Roberts	D/RW	14	3	0	3	6	0	1	1
Mario Tremblay	RW	14	3	0	3	9	0	0	0
Rick Chartraw	D/RW	13	2	1	3	17	0	0	0
Bill Nyrop	D	8	1	0	1	4	0	0	0
Pierre Bouchard	D	6	0	1	1	6	0	0	0
Rejean Houle	W	6	0	1	1	4	0	0	0
Ken Dryden	G	14	0	0	0	0	0	0	0
Brian Engblom	D	2	0	0	0	2	0	0	0
Pierre Mondou	C	4	0	0	0	0	0	0	0
Mike Polich	C/LW	5	0	0	0	0	0	0	0

==== Goaltending ====
Player	MIN	GP	W	L	GA	GAA	SO
Ken Dryden	849	14	12	2	22	1.55	4
Team:	849	14	12	2	22	1.55	4

Note:

Pos = Position;GP = Games played; G = Goals; A = Assists; Pts = Points; PIM = Penalty minutes; +/- = Plus/minus; PPG = Power-play goals; SHG = Short-handed goals; GWG = Game-winning goals
Pos = Position;GP = Games played; Min, TOI = Minutes played; W = Wins; L = Losses; T,T/OT = Ties; OTL = Overtime losses; GA = Goals-against; GAA = Goals-against average; SO = Shutouts; SA = Shots against; SV = Shots saved;SV% = Save percentage;

== Awards and records ==
- Prince of Wales Trophy
- Ken Dryden and Michel Larocque, Vezina Trophy
- Ken Dryden, Goaltender, NHL First Team All-Star
- Guy Lafleur, Art Ross Trophy
- Guy Lafleur, Conn Smythe Trophy
- Guy Lafleur, Hart Memorial Trophy
- Guy Lafleur, Lou Marsh Trophy
- Guy Lafleur, right wing, NHL First Team All-Star
- Guy Lafleur, NHL leader, assists (80)
- Guy Lafleur, NHL leader, points (136)
- Guy Lapointe, defence, NHL Second Team All-Star
- Larry Robinson, defence, NHL First Team All-Star
- Steve Shutt, left wing, NHL First Team All-Star
- Steve Shutt, NHL leader, goals (60)
- 132 points, NHL record for most points in a season by a team
- +216 goal differential, NHL record for highest team differential

== Draft picks ==
Round	#	Player	Nationality	College/junior/club team
1	12	Peter Lee	United Kingdom	Ottawa 67's (OHA)
1	13	Rod Schutt	Canada	Sudbury Wolves (OMJHL)
1	18	Bruce Baker	Canada	Ottawa 67's (OMJHL)
2	36	Barry Melrose	Canada	Kamloops Chiefs (WCHL)
3	54	Bill Baker	United States	University of Minnesota (WCHA)
4	72	Ed Clarey	Canada	Cornwall Royals (QMJHL)
5	90	Maurice Barrette	Canada	Quebec Remparts (QMJHL)
6	108	Pierre Brassard	Canada	Cornwall Royals (QMJHL)
7	118	Rich Gosselin	Canada	Flin Flon Bombers (WCHL)
8	123	John Gregory	Canada	University of Wisconsin (WCHA)
9	125	Bruce Horsch	United States	Michigan Tech University (WCHA)
10	127	John Tavella	Canada	Sault Ste. Marie Greyhounds (OMJHL)
11	129	Mark Davidson	Canada	Flin Flon Bombers (WCHL)
12	131	Bill Wells	Canada	Cornwall Royals (QMJHL)
13	133	Ron Wilson	Canada	St. Catharines Black Hawks (OMJHL)
