= Jack McIlhargey =

Canadian ice hockey player (1952–2020)

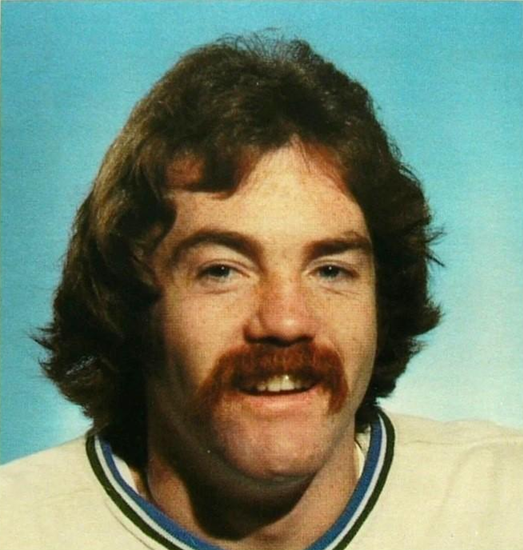
- Born: March 7, 1952 Edmonton, Alberta, Canada
- Died: July 19, 2020 (aged 68) Burnaby, British Columbia, Canada
- Height: 6 ft 0 in (183 cm)
- Weight: 200 lb (91 kg; 14 st 4 lb)
- Position: Defence
- Shot: Left
- Played for: Philadelphia Flyers; Vancouver Canucks; Hartford Whalers
- NHL draft: Undrafted
- Playing career: 1972–1982

John Cecil McIlhargey (March 7, 1952 – July 19, 2020) was a Canadian professional ice hockey defenceman who played eight seasons in the National Hockey League (NHL). He played for the Philadelphia Flyers, Vancouver Canucks, and Hartford Whalers from 1974 until 1982. He featured in two Stanley Cup Finals with the Flyers (1975, 1980).

After his playing career, he worked for both the Canucks and Flyers in coaching roles, and also served as a scout for the Canucks for one season.

== Playing career ==
McIlhargey was born on March 7, 1952, in Edmonton, Alberta. He played only one season in major junior hockey, splitting the season between the Victoria Cougars and the Flin Flon Bombers of the Western Canadian Hockey League. He racked up 279 penalty minutes as a defenseman, his rough style of play and fighting ability contributing to numerous penalties. Undrafted in the 1972 NHL or WHA amateur draft, he signed with the Jersey Devils in the EHL where he played 72 games in the 1972-73 season. He also played 9 games in the same season in the AHL for the Richmond Robins. He toiled in the minor leagues until he was first called up by Philadelphia Flyers and played two games in the 1974-75 season. He would see another full season with the Richmond Robins before playing 57 games for the NHL's Flyers in 1975-76, the era of the "Broad Street Bullies" as the team was known. McIlhargey's playing career in the NHL spanned 7 years on defense splitting nearly full seasons between Philadelphia, Vancouver Canucks and Hartford Whalers. He became a Vancouver Canuck on January 20, 1977, when he was traded to Vancouver with Larry Goodenough in exchange for Bob Dailey. He appeared in 167 games for the Canucks (1977–80) before being dealt back to Philadelphia for cash on January 2, 1980. He finished his NHL career for the Hartford Whalers after he was traded there with Norm Barnes on November 21, 1980, for Hartford's second round choice in the 1982 Entry Draft. He played in 393 career NHL games recording 11 goals, 36 assists and 1102 penalty minutes. He retired following the 1981–82 season.

== Post-playing career ==
After retiring as a player, McIlhargey was a member of the Vancouver Canucks organization from 1984 to 2007, serving mostly as an assistant coach with the NHL team but also as a head coach of their top minor-league affiliates in Milwaukee, Hamilton and Syracuse from 1991 to 1999.

Originally hired by the club as a special assistant to general manager Harry Neale in 1984, McIlhargey was responsible for establishing the Canucks Alumni Association and a number of scouting assignments. He moved into coaching that November after the firing of head coach Bill LaForge and spent the next seven years as an assistant coach to Neale, Tom Watt, Bob McCammon and Pat Quinn.

In 1988, the Canucks sent McIlhargey and their 21-year-old goaltender prospect Troy Gamble to the Soviet Union to support a relationship that would later result in Soviet stars Igor Larionov and Vladimir Krutov joining the Canucks. While Gamble endured four weeks of rigorous off-season training with Dynamo Moscow and Spartak, McIlhargey got to socialize with legendary Soviet coach Anatoli Tarasov. Three years later, McIlhargey was placed in charge of Vancouver's minor league affiliate in Milwaukee, where he spent the 1991–92 season. He remained as head coach of Vancouver's farm teams as they moved to Hamilton for the 1992–93 and 1993–94 seasons, then finally to Syracuse from 1994 to 1999, where he was that AHL franchise's first head coach.

McIlhargey was voted one of the 30 All-Time Greatest Canucks in 1999. On June 22, 2006, he was fired by new head coach Alain Vigneault from his assistant coach position with the Canucks. It was later announced that McIlhargey would be working as a pro scout for the Vancouver Canucks. He worked in that capacity for one season, before moving to the Flyers as an assistant coach in 2007. After two seasons, he was dismissed on December 4, 2009, along with John Stevens. McIlhargey was subsequently inducted into the B.C. Hockey Hall of Fame in 2011.

McIlhargey died on July 19, 2020, at his home on Capitol Hill, Burnaby. He was 68 and had suffered from cancer in the years leading up to his death.

== Career statistics ==
=== Regular season and playoffs ===
			Regular season					Playoffs
Season	Team	League	GP	G	A	Pts	PIM	GP	G	A	Pts	PIM
1970–71	New Westminster Royals	BCJHL	—	—	—	—	—	—	—	—	—	—
1971–72	Victoria Cougars	WCHL	24	1	1	2	137	—	—	—	—	—
1971–72	Flin Flon Bombers	WCHL	33	1	4	5	142	7	0	1	1	39
1972–73	Jersey Devils	EHL	72	2	7	9	229	—	—	—	—	—
1972–73	Richmond Robins	AHL	9	0	1	1	4	4	0	0	0	7
1973–74	Des Moines Capitols	IHL	16	1	2	3	52	—	—	—	—	—
1973–74	Richmond Robins	AHL	54	2	10	12	163	5	0	0	0	12
1974–75	Philadelphia Flyers	NHL	2	0	0	0	11	—	—	—	—	—
1974–75	Richmond Robins	AHL	72	4	3	7	316	7	0	3	3	45
1975–76	Philadelphia Flyers	NHL	57	1	2	3	205	15	0	3	3	41
1975–76	Richmond Robins	AHL	4	0	0	0	17	—	—	—	—	—
1976–77	Philadelphia Flyers	NHL	40	2	1	3	164	—	—	—	—	—
1976–77	Vancouver Canucks	NHL	21	1	7	8	61	—	—	—	—	—
1977–78	Vancouver Canucks	NHL	69	3	5	8	172	—	—	—	—	—
1978–79	Vancouver Canucks	NHL	53	2	4	6	129	3	0	0	0	2
1979–80	Vancouver Canucks	NHL	24	0	2	2	41	—	—	—	—	—
1979–80	Philadelphia Flyers	NHL	26	0	4	4	95	9	0	0	0	25
1980–81	Philadelphia Flyers	NHL	3	0	0	0	22	—	—	—	—	—
1980–81	Maine Mariners	AHL	3	0	1	1	7	16	6	1	7	62
1980–81	Hartford Whalers	NHL	48	1	6	7	142	—	—	—	—	—
1981–82	Hartford Whalers	NHL	50	1	5	6	60	—	—	—	—	—
NHL totals			393	11	36	47	1102	27	0	3	3	68
