= Drew Callander =

Canadian ice hockey player (born 1956)

- Born: August 17, 1956 (age 69) Regina, Saskatchewan, Canada
- Height: 6 ft 2 in (188 cm)
- Weight: 190 lb (86 kg; 13 st 8 lb)
- Position: Centre
- Shot: Right
- Played for: Philadelphia Flyers; Vancouver Canucks
- NHL draft: 35th overall, 1976; Philadelphia Flyers
- WHA draft: 30th overall, 1976; Edmonton Oilers
- Playing career: 1978–1987

Leonard Drew Callander (born August 17, 1956) is a Canadian former professional ice hockey centre player who spents parts of four seasons in the National Hockey League (NHL) in the late 1970s. Born in Regina, Saskatchewan.

== Playing career ==
Callander was the second-round pick (35th overall) of the Philadelphia Flyers in the 1976 NHL entry draft after a 105-point season for the Regina Pats of the WHL. Turning pro the following season, he spent most of the season in the AHL for the Springfield Indians, although he did receive a two-game callup to the Flyers and scored his first NHL goal on his first shift.

Callander would play only 16 more games for a deep Flyers team before being dealt to the Vancouver Canucks midway through the 1978–79 season, in a trade which involved Callander and defenseman Kevin McCarthy going to Vancouver, with Dennis Ververgaert going the other way. He finished the year with 4 goals and 5 points in 32 games between Philadelphia and Vancouver, all career highs. He would remain with the Canuck organization until 1982, but spent almost all of this time with the Dallas Black Hawks, Vancouver's Central Hockey League affiliate, seeing only 4 more games of NHL action in the 1979–80 season.

After being released by the Canucks, Callander spent four seasons playing in Germany before returning to North America to play one last season with the Muskegon Lumberjacks of the IHL before retiring.

In his career, Callander played 39 NHL games, recording 6 goals and 8 points along with 7 penalty minutes.

Callander is the older brother of Jock Callander. The two played together for Muskegon in 1986–87, combining for 222 points. He is also the father of Preston Callander, who played for the University of New Hampshire from 2001 to 2005. He spent 2005- 2007 with the Wolfsburg Grizzly Adams in the German Elite league and spent the 2007–08 season with the Florida Everblades of the ECHL.

== Career statistics ==
=== Regular season and playoffs ===
			Regular season					Playoffs
Season	Team	League	GP	G	A	Pts	PIM	GP	G	A	Pts	PIM
1973–74	Regina Pats	WCHL	68	9	7	16	7	16	0	0	0	0
1974–75	Regina Pats	WCHL	51	17	15	32	36	11	9	10	19	16
1975–76	Regina Pats	WCHL	72	49	56	105	64	6	4	6	10	16
1976–77	Springfield Indians	AHL	59	18	22	40	41	—	—	—	—	—
1976–77	Philadelphia Flyers	NHL	2	1	0	1	0	—	—	—	—	—
1977–78	Maine Mariners	AHL	78	40	42	82	72	12	6	4	10	30
1977–78	Philadelphia Flyers	NHL	1	0	0	0	0	—	—	—	—	—
1978–79	Maine Mariners	AHL	9	1	4	5	9	—	—	—	—	—
1978–79	Philadelphia Flyers	NHL	15	2	1	3	5	—	—	—	—	—
1978–79	Vancouver Canucks	NHL	17	2	0	2	2	—	—	—	—	—
1978–79	Dallas Black Hawks	CHL	26	12	10	22	23	9	4	6	10	12
1979–80	Dallas Black Hawks	CHL	33	15	10	25	20	—	—	—	—	—
1979–80	Vancouver Canucks	NHL	4	1	1	2	0	—	—	—	—	—
1980–81	Dallas Black Hawks	CHL	77	43	29	72	51	6	0	2	2	2
1981–82	Dallas Black Hawks	CHL	80	40	47	87	79	16	8	15	23	34
1982–83	Duisburger SC	GER-2	40	55	58	113	—	—	—	—	—	—
1983–84	Kölner EC	GER	42	19	7	26	44	—	—	—	—	—
1984–85	Kölner EC	GER	38	16	20	36	36	7	3	8	11	10
1985–86	SV Bayreuth	GER	36	12	17	29	22	17	15	13	28	31
1986–87	Muskegon Lumberjacks	IHL	80	34	52	86	92	10	5	5	10	0
NHL totals			39	6	2	8	7	—	—	—	—	—
