= Good Enough =

Good Enough may refer to:

== Songs ==
- "Good Enough" (Bobby Brown song), 1992
- "Good Enough" (Dodgy song), 1996
- "Good Enough" (Evanescence song), 2006
- "Good Enough" (The Ready Set song), 2016
- "Good Enough" (G Flip song), 2023
- "Good Enough" (Chanyeol song), 2023
- "Good Enough", by 8stops7 from In Moderation, 1999
- "Good Enough", by Brian McKnight from U-Turn, 2003
- "Good Enough", by Cover Your Tracks from Fever Dream, 2017
- "Good Enough", by Darren Hayes from Spin, 2002
- "Good Enough", by Hoobastank from Every Man for Himself, 2006
- "Good Enough", by I Wayne from Book of Life, 2007
- "Good Enough", by Izzy Stradlin from 117°, 1998
- "Good Enough", by Jay Sean from My Own Way, 2008
- "Good Enough", by Lifehouse from the film soundtrack The Wild, 2006
- "Good Enough", by Little Mix from Salute, 2013
- "Good Enough", by Maisie Peters, 2022
- "Good Enough", by Maxeen from Maxeen, 2003
- "Good Enough", by Melanie Laine from Time Flies, 2005
- "Good Enough", by Mock Orange from Mock Orange, 1998
- "Good Enough", by Mudhoney from Every Good Boy Deserves Fudge, 1991
- "Good Enough", by Samiam from You Are Freaking Me Out, 1997
- "Good Enough", by Sarah McLachlan from Fumbling Towards Ecstasy, 1993
- "Good Enough", by Tom Petty from Mojo, 2010
- "Good Enough", by Van Halen from Fifty-One-Fifty, 1986
- "Good Enough", by Westbound Train from Transitions, 2006

== Other uses ==
- Good Enough (album), by Ola, 2007
- Good Enough, a 2016 film featuring James Caan

== See also ==
- Principle of good enough, a software design philosophy
- "The Goonies 'R' Good Enough", also known as "Good Enough", a song by Cyndi Lauper from the soundtrack to The Goonies
- "Good Enough Is Good Enough", a song by Sonata Arctica from Unia
- Goodenough (disambiguation)
- Godunov
