= Dennis Ververgaert =

Canadian ice hockey player (born 1953)

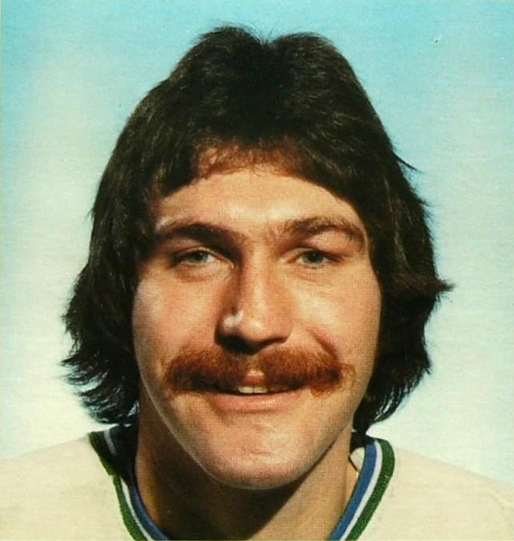
- Born: March 30, 1953 (age 73) Grimsby, Ontario, Canada
- Height: 6 ft 1 in (185 cm)
- Weight: 190 lb (86 kg; 13 st 8 lb)
- Position: Right wing
- Shot: Right
- Played for: Vancouver Canucks; Philadelphia Flyers; Washington Capitals
- NHL draft: 3rd overall, 1973; Vancouver Canucks
- WHA draft: 67th overall, 1973; New York Golden Blades
- Playing career: 1973–1981

Dennis Andrew Ververgaert (born March 30, 1953) is a Canadian former professional ice hockey right winger who played in the National Hockey League (NHL) from 1973 until 1981. He featured in the 1980 Stanley Cup Finals with the Flyers.

Ververgaert is best known for his time with the Vancouver Canucks, where he was one of the club's top players in their first decade of existence. He was selected to play in the NHL All-Star Game in 1976 and 1978.

== Early life ==
Ververgaert was born on March 30, 1953, in Grimsby, Ontario, Canada to Dutch immigrant parents from Holland. He grew up alongside his sister Trish and two brothers, Gary and Peter. His older brother Gary also played Junior A hockey before dying in a car accident in March 1971.

== Playing career ==
=== Junior ===
Ververgaert had a dominant junior career with the London Knights, scoring 147 points in 1972–73, including a franchise record 89 assists. (Note: His record was surpassed by Sergei Kostitsyn in 2005–06) Ververgaert was selected third overall in the 1973 NHL amateur draft by the Vancouver Canucks.

=== Professional ===
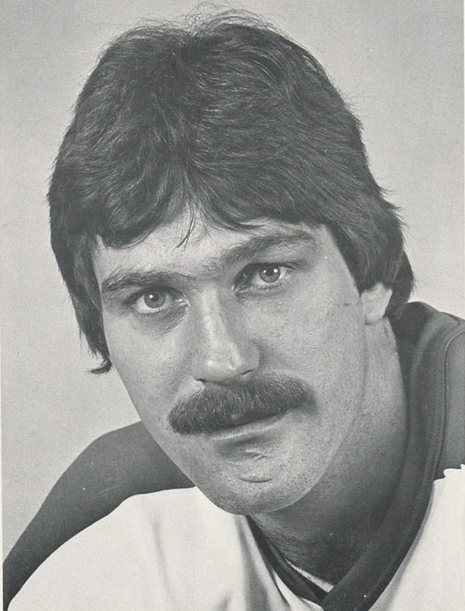
1980 photo of Ververgaert for Washington Capitals

Ververgaert recorded a team-leading 26 goals along with 31 assists for 57 points as a rookie. He led all rookies in goals and was second in points to Tom Lysiak, and finished fourth in Calder Memorial Trophy voting as the league's top rookie. His 26 goals remained the Canucks' rookie record until broken by Trevor Linden in 1988–89.

In 1974–75 Ververgaert was even better, recording 51 points in 57 games despite missing substantial time due to a serious shoulder injury. He helped the Canucks win their division and qualify for the playoffs for the first time. His best season was in 1975–76, where he led the Canucks with 37 goals and 71 points. He was also selected to play in his first NHL All-Star Game and proceeded to score two goals in 10 seconds to set an All-Star record. (Note: His record was surpassed by Owen Nolan)

After the success of his first three seasons, Ververgaert's production dropped off, and he came under increased criticism for his poor defensive play. His greatest success had been with center André Boudrias, and after Boudrias left for the World Hockey Association, he was never able to find the same sort of chemistry with later linemates. In 1976–77, Ververgaert slumped to 27 goals and just 45 points, while recording a plus/minus rating of -35. He rebounded slightly in 1977–78 to tally 21 goals and a career-high 33 assists for 54 points, and was selected to play in his second All-Star game.

In 1978–79, Ververgaert started the season slowly, with nine goals in his first 35 games. Midway through the season, he was dealt to the Philadelphia Flyers for Kevin McCarthy and Drew Callander, and finished the year with career lows of 18 goals and 44 points. In Philadelphia, Ververgaert was used sparingly and was occasionally a healthy scratch. He recorded 14 goals and 17 assists for 31 points in 58 games in 1979–80, but only appeared in two games in the Stanley Cup playoffs.

Released by the Flyers, Ververgaert signed with the Washington Capitals for 1980–81. He finished the year with 14 goals and 41 points in 79 games. However, at the start of the 1981–82 campaign he was assigned to the minors, and chose to retire rather than accept the assignment.

Ververgaert finished his career with totals of 176 goals and 216 assists for 392 points in 583 games, along with 247 penalty minutes. His 139 goals as a Vancouver Canuck ranked 11th all-time, and only Don Lever scored more goals for the club from 1970 to 1980.

== Post-retirement ==
Following his career, Ververgaert returned to Vancouver, where he operates an insurance business and is an active member of the Canucks' alumni organization. In January 2025, Ververgaert was inducted into the London Knights Hall of Fame.

== Personal life ==
Ververgaert and his wife Maureen, a Vancouver native, have two sons together.

In 1973, Ververgaert, his brother Peter, and a friend were charged with possession of stolen property. While his brother pleaded guilty, the charges against Ververgaert and his friend were dropped. In an unrelated case the following year, Ververgaert pled guilty to driving while intoxicated and received a three-month licence suspension and a fine. A separate incident in 1975 resulted in Ververgaert paying a $200 fine after pleading guilty to common assault.

== Career statistics ==
			Regular season					Playoffs
Season	Team	League	GP	G	A	Pts	PIM	GP	G	A	Pts	PIM
1970–71	St. Catharines Black Hawks	OHA-Jr.	5	0	0	0	0	—	—	—	—	—
1970–71	London Knights	OHA-Jr.	62	39	48	87	98	4	1	0	1	4
1971–72	London Knights	OHA-Jr.	62	44	73	117	65	7	5	7	12	8
1972–73	London Knights	OHA-Jr.	63	58	89	147	86	18	13	12	25	6
1973–74	Vancouver Canucks	NHL	78	26	31	57	25	—	—	—	—	—
1974–75	Vancouver Canucks	NHL	57	19	32	51	25	1	0	0	0	0
1975–76	Vancouver Canucks	NHL	80	37	34	71	53	2	1	0	1	4
1976–77	Vancouver Canucks	NHL	79	27	18	45	38	—	—	—	—	—
1977–78	Vancouver Canucks	NHL	80	21	33	54	23	—	—	—	—	—
1978–79	Vancouver Canucks	NHL	35	9	17	26	13	—	—	—	—	—
1978–79	Philadelphia Flyers	NHL	37	9	7	16	6	3	0	2	2	2
1979–80	Philadelphia Flyers	NHL	58	14	17	31	24	2	0	0	0	0
1980–81	Washington Capitals	NHL	79	14	27	41	40	—	—	—	—	—
NHL totals			583	176	216	392	247	8	1	2	3	6

== Notes ==
Awards and achievements
Preceded by Don Lever	Vancouver Canucks first-round draft pick 1973	Succeeded by Bob Dailey
