= Goodnough =

Goodnough is an English surname. Notable people with the surname include:

- Robert Goodnough (1917–2010), American abstract expressionist painter
- X. Henry Goodnough (1860–1935), American engineer

== See also ==
- Goodnough Dike, a dam in Massachusetts
- Goodenough (disambiguation)
