= Kevin McCarthy (ice hockey) =

Canadian ice hockey player (born 1957)

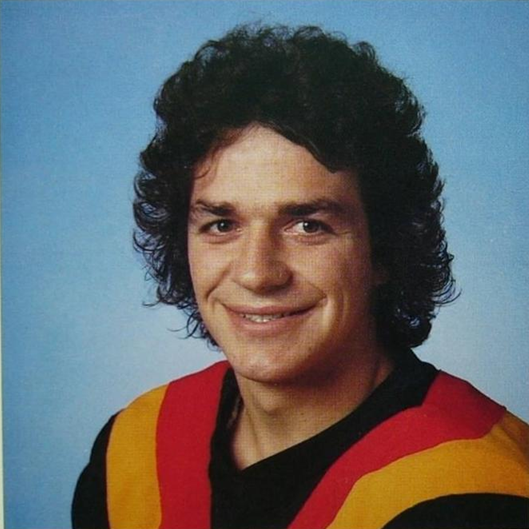
- Born: July 14, 1957 (age 69) Winnipeg, Manitoba, Canada
- Height: 6 ft 1 in (185 cm)
- Weight: 195 lb (88 kg; 13 st 13 lb)
- Position: Defence
- Shot: Right
- Played for: Philadelphia Flyers; Vancouver Canucks; Pittsburgh Penguins
- National team: Canada
- NHL draft: 17th overall, 1977; Philadelphia Flyers
- WHA draft: 48th overall, 1977; Houston Aeros
- Playing career: 1977–1988

Kevin McCarthy (born July 14, 1957) is a Canadian former professional ice hockey player who spent 10 seasons in the National Hockey League (NHL) between 1977 and 1987, serving as captain of the Vancouver Canucks from 1979 until 1982.

== Playing career ==
As a youth, McCarthy played in the 1969 Quebec International Pee-Wee Hockey Tournament with the Winnipeg St. James minor ice hockey team.

Playing for his hometown Winnipeg Monarchs, McCarthy was one of the most dominant junior defenders of his era. Following a memorable 1976–77 season in which he set WCHL records for defenders with 105 assists and 127 points (later broken by Cam Plante), he was selected in the first round (17th overall) in the 1977 NHL amateur draft by the Philadelphia Flyers.

McCarthy stepped straight into the Flyers' roster in the 1977–78 season, posting 2 goals and 17 points along with a stellar +29 rating. Early in the 1978–79 campaign, however, he was dealt to the Vancouver Canucks in a deal for Dennis Ververgaert. The deal would prove controversial, as McCarthy was damaged goods and played only a single game for Vancouver before requiring surgery for a pre-existing hip condition.

Back to full health in 1979–80, McCarthy would be a revelation for Vancouver as he led the team's blueliners with 15 goals and 45 points and finished 3rd in overall team scoring. It would be the first of four consecutive 40-point seasons on the Canuck blueline for McCarthy, who impressed with his powerful point shot and fine outlet passing and was quickly becoming the team's top all-around defender.

McCarthy responded with the finest season of his career, tying a team record for defenders with 16 goals and registering a career-high 53 points. He was also selected to represent the Canucks in the 1981 NHL All-Star Game in Los Angeles. After another fine season in 1981–82, McCarthy would suffer a broken ankle on the eve of the 1982 playoffs, and was forced to watch from the pressbox as the Canucks marched all the way to the Stanley Cup Final before losing to the New York Islanders. Stan Smyl captained the Canucks on their Cinderella run to the finals.

After a poor start to the 1983–84 season, McCarthy would be a victim of a rebuilding process in Vancouver and was dealt to the Pittsburgh Penguins for a draft pick, one of three top defenders (along with Harold Snepsts and Lars Lindgren) shipped out within a few months of each other. He re-discovered his offensive game in Pittsburgh, posting 20 points in 31 games, but was a horrific -32 over that stretch for the last-place Penguins. After a disappointing 1984–85 season in which he slumped to just 19 points, he was released by the Penguins.

After his release from the Penguins, McCarthy returned to Philadelphia, signing with the Flyers as a free agent. However, his career was on the downturn and he spent most of the next three seasons in the minors with the Hershey Bears, appearing in only 6 games for the Flyers over that stretch. He retired in 1988.

In 537 career NHL games, McCarthy amassed 67 goals and 191 assists for 258 points along with 527 penalty minutes. His 51 goals were the most ever by a Vancouver Canuck blueliner at the time of his departure, and he remains 6th all-time for the club in that category.

== Coaching career ==
During his time as a player in Hershey, McCarthy developed a quality reputation for his leadership and work with young players, and was promoted to a player-assistant coach during the 1987-88 season. Following his retirement, he remained as an assistant coach for the Bears, and was promoted to head coach for the 1989-90 season. After a season in that capacity, he then spent two seasons as pro scouting director for the Philadelphia Flyers.

He went on to serve as an assistant coach with the Hartford Whalers from 1992 until 1995 before returning to the AHL to take on head coaching duties with the Springfield Falcons and the Beast of New Haven.

McCarthy served as an assistant coach for the Carolina Hurricanes from 1999 to 2009, and won the Stanley Cup as a member of the Hurricanes' coaching staff in 2006. McCarthy was brought into the Philadelphia Flyers organization in 2009 as an assistant coach with head coach Peter Laviolette.

On October 7, 2013 McCarthy, along with head coach Peter Laviolette, was relieved of his assistant coach position by Flyers general manager, Paul Holmgren.

On May 6, 2014, Laviolette and McCarthy were hired by the Nashville Predators as head coach and assistant coach, respectively.

On July 21, 2017, McCarthy was promoted to associate coach, after Phil Housley was hired by the Buffalo Sabres and Dan Muse was hired by the Nashville Predators as an assistant coach.

On January 6, 2020, Laviolette and McCarthy were fired by the Nashville Predators. McCarthy was an assistant coach with the Washington Capitals from October 2020 until April 2023, while Laviolette was Washington’s head coach.

== Awards and achievements ==
- WCHL First All-Star Team (1976 and 1977)
- WCHL Top Defenceman (1976)
- WCHL Player of the Year (1977)
- Played in NHL All-Star Game (1981)
- AHL First All-Star Team (1986)
- Calder Cup (AHL) Championship (1988)
- "Honoured Member" of the Manitoba Hockey Hall of Fame
- Stanley Cup (2006, coaching)

== Career statistics ==
=== Regular season and playoffs ===
			Regular season					Playoffs
Season	Team	League	GP	G	A	Pts	PIM	GP	G	A	Pts	PIM
1973–74	Winnipeg Clubs	WCJHL	66	5	22	27	65	—	—	—	—	—
1974–75	Winnipeg Clubs	WCJHL	66	20	61	81	102	—	—	—	—	—
1975–76	Winnipeg Clubs	WCJHL	72	33	88	121	160	6	2	9	11	8
1976–77	Winnipeg Monarchs	WCJHL	72	22	105	127	110	7	0	4	4	27
1977–78	Philadelphia Flyers	NHL	62	2	15	17	32	10	0	1	1	8
1978–79	Philadelphia Flyers	NHL	22	1	2	3	21	—	—	—	—	—
1978–79	Vancouver Canucks	NHL	1	0	0	0	0	—	—	—	—	—
1979–80	Vancouver Canucks	NHL	79	15	30	45	70	4	1	0	1	0
1980–81	Vancouver Canucks	NHL	80	16	37	53	85	3	0	1	1	0
1981–82	Vancouver Canucks	NHL	71	6	39	45	84	—	—	—	—	—
1982–83	Vancouver Canucks	NHL	74	12	28	40	88	4	1	1	2	12
1983–84	Vancouver Canucks	NHL	47	2	14	16	61	—	—	—	—	—
1983–84	Pittsburgh Penguins	NHL	31	4	16	20	52	—	—	—	—	—
1984–85	Pittsburgh Penguins	NHL	64	9	10	19	30	—	—	—	—	—
1985–86	Philadelphia Flyers	NHL	4	0	0	0	4	—	—	—	—	—
1985–86	Hershey Bears	AHL	64	15	40	55	157	17	1	10	11	12
1986–87	Philadelphia Flyers	NHL	2	0	0	0	0	—	—	—	—	—
1986–87	Hershey Bears	AHL	74	6	44	50	86	5	0	4	4	4
1987–88	Hershey Bears	AHL	61	9	30	39	83	12	2	6	8	17
NHL totals			537	67	191	258	527	21	2	3	5	20

=== International ===
Year	Team	Event	GP	G	A	Pts	PIM
1975	Canada	WJC	5	1	4	5	6

Preceded by Mark Suzor	Philadelphia Flyers' first-round draft pick 1977	Succeeded by Behn Wilson
Preceded by Don Lever	Vancouver Canucks captain 1979–82	Succeeded by Stan Smyl
