= Mark Suzor =

Canadian ice hockey player

- Born: November 5, 1956 (age 69) Windsor, Ontario, Canada
- Height: 6 ft 2 in (188 cm)
- Weight: 220 lb (100 kg; 15 st 10 lb)
- Position: Defence
- Shot: Left
- Played for: Philadelphia Flyers; Colorado Rockies
- NHL draft: 17th overall, 1976; Philadelphia Flyers
- WHA draft: 25th overall, 1976; San Diego Mariners
- Playing career: 1976–1981

Mark Joseph Suzor (born November 5, 1956) is a Canadian former professional ice hockey player.

== Playing career ==
Born in Windsor, Ontario, Suzor spent his junior days with the Kingston Canadians of the Ontario Hockey Association (OHA) from 1973–76, scoring 119 points (36 goals and 83 assists) in 186 games, and also earned 16 points (3 goals, 13 assists) in 15 playoff games. He was drafted by the Philadelphia Flyers of the National Hockey League (NHL) with the 17th overall pick in the 1976 NHL entry draft, and was also drafted by the San Diego Mariners of the World Hockey Association in the 1976 WHA Amateur Draft as the 25th overall pick. Suzor signed with Philadelphia and continued to work towards the NHL.

He spent most of the 1976–77 season with the Springfield Indians of the American Hockey League (AHL), scoring 49 points (24 goals, 25 assist) in 74 games, and he spent some time with the Flyers, earning an assist in 4 games. After the season, he was dealt to the Colorado Rockies for Barry Dean, and spent the 1977–78 season with the club, scoring 19 points (4 goals, 15 assists) in 60 games. Suzor was then traded again, as the Rockies sent him to the Boston Bruins for Clayton Pachal.

Suzor bounced around four teams in the 1978–79 season, playing with the Saginaw Gears of the International Hockey League (IHL), scoring 24 points (12 goals, 12 assists) in 29 games, the Grand Rapids Owls of the IHL, with 2 assists in two games, the Muskegon Mohawks of the IHL, scoring 6 points (1 goal, 5 assists) in 16 games, and finally with the Rochester Americans of the AHL, earning 10 points (4 goals, 6 assists) in 24 games. He played the 1979–80 season with the Owls, having the most productive season of his pro career, with 53 points (20 goals, 33 assists) in 58 games, and played 7 games with the Binghamton Dusters of the AHL, earning an assist.

Mark finished his pro career in 1980–81, playing in 8 games with the Toledo Goaldiggers, getting 3 points (1 goal, 2 assists) before retiring from his playing career.

== Career statistics ==
=== Regular season and playoffs ===
			Regular season					Playoffs
Season	Team	League	GP	G	A	Pts	PIM	GP	G	A	Pts	PIM
1973–74	Kingston Canadians	OHA	68	6	9	15	13	—	—	—	—	—
1974–75	Kingston Canadians	OMJHL	70	14	44	58	104	8	1	8	9	42
1975–76	Kingston Canadians	OMJHL	48	16	30	46	108	7	2	5	7	18
1976–77	Springfield Indians	AHL	74	24	25	49	108	—	—	—	—	—
1976–77	Philadelphia Flyers	NHL	4	0	1	1	4	—	—	—	—	—
1977–78	Colorado Rockies	NHL	60	4	15	19	56	—	—	—	—	—
1978–79	Rochester Americans	AHL	24	4	6	10	16	—	—	—	—	—
1978–79	Saginaw Gears	IHL	29	12	12	24	43	—	—	—	—	—
1978–79	Grand Rapids Owls	IHL	2	0	2	2	0	—	—	—	—	—
1978–79	Muskegon Mohawks	IHL	16	1	5	6	6	—	—	—	—	—
1979–80	Binghamton Dusters	AHL	7	0	1	1	2	—	—	—	—	—
1979–80	Grand Rapids Owls	IHL	58	20	33	53	109	—	—	—	—	—
1980–81	Toledo Goaldiggers	IHL	8	1	2	3	0	—	—	—	—	—
IHL totals			113	34	54	88	51	—	—	—	—	—
AHL totals			105	28	32	60	124	—	—	—	—	—
NHL totals			64	4	16	20	60	—	—	—	—	—

Preceded by Mel Bridgman	Philadelphia Flyers' first-round draft pick 1976	Succeeded by Kevin McCarthy
