= Sir William Goodenough, 1st Baronet =

British banker (1899–1951)

Sir William Macnamara Goodenough, 1st Baronet DL (10 March 1899 – 23 May 1951) was a British banker. He served as the Chairman of Barclays Bank from 1947 to 1951.

== Early life ==
William Macnamara Goodenough was born in 1899. He was the son of Frederick Goodenough, who had been chairman of Barclays Bank from 1917 to 1934. He was educated at Wellington College and the University of Oxford (Christ Church).

== Career ==
Goodenough served as the Chairman of Barclays Bank from 1947 to 1951.

== Death and legacy ==
Goodenough died in 1951. He was succeeded to the title by his son, Sir Richard Edmund Goodenough, 2nd Baronet (1925–1996).

Baronetage of the United Kingdom
New creation	Baronet (of Broadwell and Filkins); 1943–1951	Succeeded by Richard Goodenough
