= Frederick Goodenough =

British banker (1866–1934)

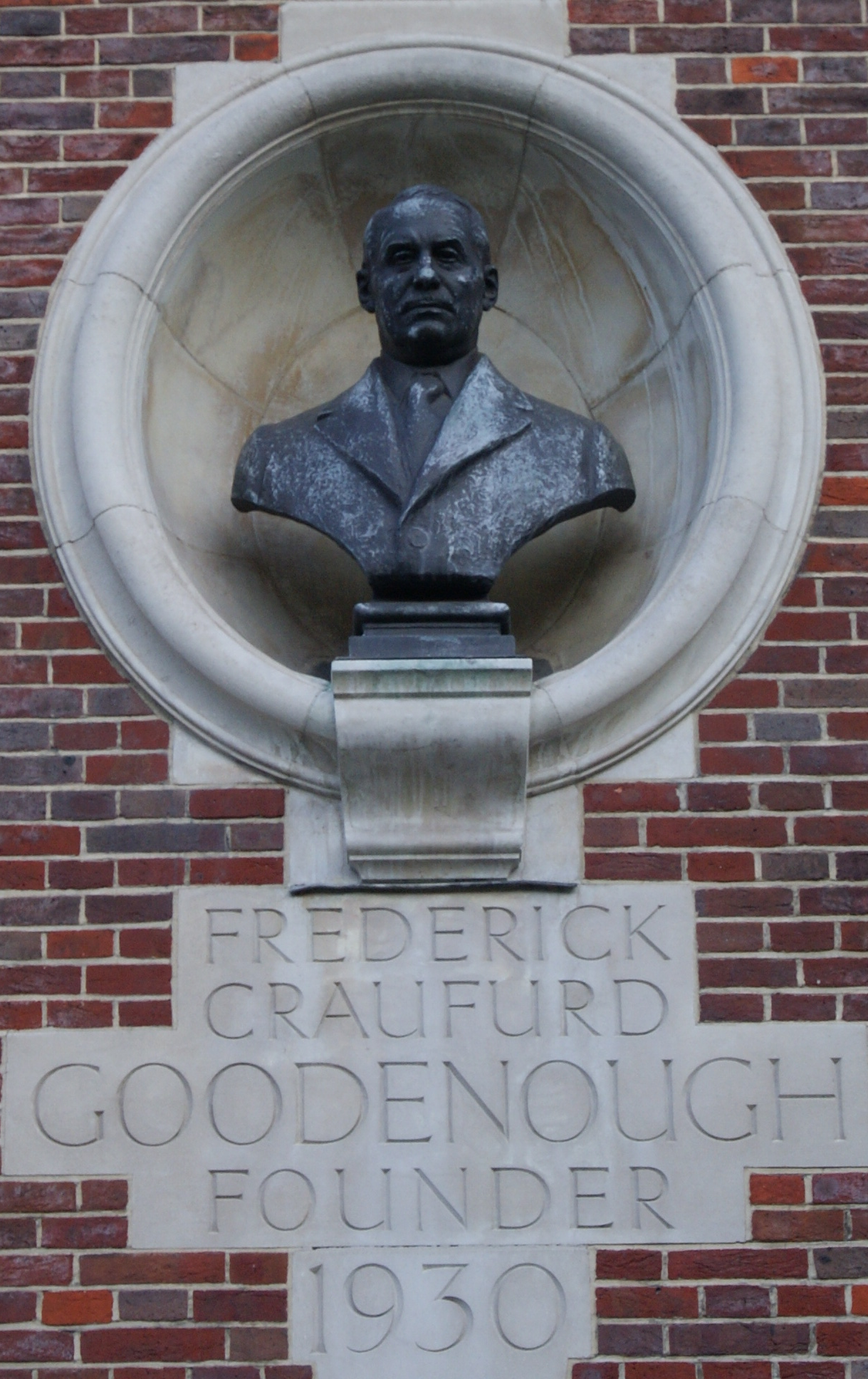
Bust of Frederick Craufurd Goodenough, at London House, London, UK

Frederick Craufurd Goodenough (28 July 1866 – 1 September 1934), was a British banker. He was the chairman of Barclays Bank from 1917 to 1934.

== Early life ==
Frederick Craufurd Goodenough was born in Calcutta, India in 1866 as Frederick Crawford Goodenough. He was the son of an East India Company merchant Frederick Addington Goodenough and Mary Lambert. He was the grandson of Edmund Goodenough, Dean of Wells from 1831 to 1845. He was educated at the Charterhouse School and Zurich University.

== Career ==
Goodenough was the chairman of Barclays Bank from 1917 to 1934.

== Death and legacy ==
Goodenough died in London in 1934. He was a founder of Goodenough College. His son, Sir William Goodenough, 1st Baronet (1899-1951) was chairman of Barclays Bank from 1947 to 1951.
