= Mel Bridgman =

Canadian ice hockey player (1955–2025)

- Born: April 28, 1955 Trenton, Ontario, Canada
- Died: November 6, 2025 (aged 70) Comox, British Columbia, Canada
- Height: 6 ft 0 in (183 cm)
- Weight: 190 lb (86 kg; 13 st 8 lb)
- Position: Centre
- Shot: Left
- Played for: Philadelphia Flyers; Calgary Flames; New Jersey Devils; Detroit Red Wings; Vancouver Canucks
- National team: Canada
- NHL draft: 1st overall, 1975; Philadelphia Flyers
- WHA draft: 4th overall, 1975; Denver Spurs
- Playing career: 1975–1989

Melvin John Bridgman (April 28, 1955 – November 6, 2025) was a Canadian professional ice hockey centre who played 14 seasons in the National Hockey League NHL) for five teams from 1975–76 until 1988–89. He participated in two Stanley Cup Finals with the Philadelphia Flyers (1976, 1980) and was the team captain for both the Flyers and the New Jersey Devils during his career. He later would become a player agent and front office executive, serving as the first general manager of the contemporary Ottawa Senators franchise.

== Early life ==
Mel was born in Trenton, Ontario, but spent his early years in Thunder Bay, Ontario where he first began to play hockey seriously. He was the youngest of three siblings. His father, Richard, was a meteorologist and his mother Mary (née Watt), was a teacher and later a homemaker. When Mel was a teenager the family once again moved this time to Victoria, British Columbia following a job transfer for his father. Despite living in Ontario, his father was a fan of the Montreal Canadiens.

== Playing career ==
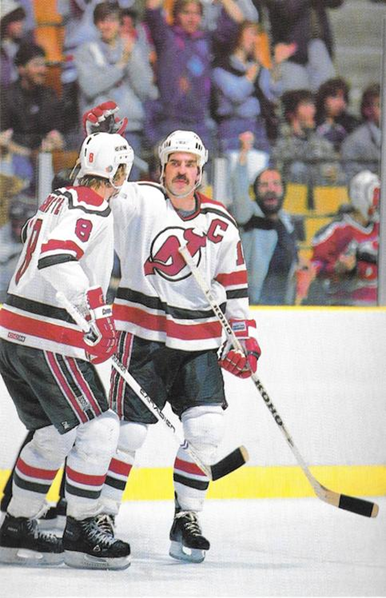
1984 photo of Bridgman for New Jersey Devils

Bridgman was drafted first overall by the Philadelphia Flyers in the 1975 NHL Amateur Draft.

Forward became a part of first trade between Flyers and Calgary Flames in history. On November 11, 1988, Bridgman was traded in exchange for defenseman Brad Marsh. In opinion of Brotherly Puck, this trade was ''by far the most important deal the two squads would ever craft, and the only one that any notable impact for either team''.

He played 977 career NHL games, scoring 252 goals and 449 assists for 701 points, as well as adding 1625 penalty minutes. His best offensive season was the 1981–82 season, when he set career highs with 33 goals, 54 assists, and 87 points. Throughout his career Bridgman was known as a consistent offensive contributor, a smart defensive centre, and a gritty, hard-nosed, power forward who would check and fight regularly.

== Post-playing career ==
After his playing career, Bridgman earned a masters degree from the Wharton School of the University of Pennsylvania in business administration in 1991. He parlayed that into a position as the general manager of the expansion Ottawa Senators in 1991 ahead of the team's entry into the NHL in 1992.

Bridgman's tenure as general manager only lasted one season, marked by the team's ineptitude and his own problems with drafting talent; in fact, three separate times during the expansion draft, due in large part to Senators management forgetting to bring a power supply or batteries to power the computer the team's draft information was stored on, Bridgman made three illegal selections and was forced to apologize for each one. After the Senators finish with a 10-70-4 record, Bridgman was dismissed from his role. One of his sons was bullied at school the day after his firing. He never took another job in professional hockey.

== Personal life and death ==
After his firing from the Senators, Bridgman went into finance, and worked for Smith Barney in California, residing with his family in Manhattan Beach. He continued to be involved in hockey, coaching his sons' hockey teams.

In 1983 he married Ann Carter, although they later divorced. Together they had four children, sons Jamie, Patrick, Geoffrey, and a daughter Christine.

Bridgman died from heart failure on November 6, 2025, at the age of 70 in Victoria. His family launched a memorial fund in his name to raise money for CTE research.

== Career statistics ==
=== Regular season and playoffs ===
| | | | Regular season | | | | | Playoffs |
| Season | Team | League | GP | G | A | Pts | PIM | GP | G | A | Pts | PIM |
|---|---|---|---|---|---|---|---|---|---|---|---|---|
| 1971–72 | Victoria Racquet Club | Minor-BC | — | — | — | — | — | — | — | — | — | — |
| 1971–72 | Victoria Cougars | WCHL | 4 | 0 | 0 | 0 | 0 | — | — | — | — | — |
| 1972–73 | Nanaimo Clippers | BCHL | 49 | 37 | 50 | 87 | 31 | — | — | — | — | — |
| 1972–73 | Victoria Cougars | WCHL | 4 | 1 | 1 | 2 | 0 | — | — | — | — | — |
| 1973–74 | Victoria Cougars | WCHL | 62 | 26 | 39 | 65 | 149 | — | — | — | — | — |
| 1974–75 | Victoria Cougars | WCHL | 66 | 66 | 91 | 157 | 175 | 12 | 12 | 6 | 18 | 34 |
| 1975–76 | Philadelphia Flyers | NHL | 80 | 23 | 27 | 50 | 86 | 16 | 6 | 8 | 14 | 31 |
| 1976–77 | Philadelphia Flyers | NHL | 70 | 19 | 38 | 57 | 120 | 7 | 1 | 0 | 1 | 8 |
| 1977–78 | Philadelphia Flyers | NHL | 76 | 16 | 32 | 48 | 203 | 12 | 1 | 7 | 8 | 36 |
| 1978–79 | Philadelphia Flyers | NHL | 76 | 24 | 35 | 59 | 184 | 8 | 1 | 2 | 3 | 17 |
| 1979–80 | Philadelphia Flyers | NHL | 74 | 16 | 31 | 47 | 136 | 19 | 2 | 9 | 11 | 70 |
| 1980–81 | Philadelphia Flyers | NHL | 77 | 14 | 37 | 51 | 195 | 12 | 2 | 4 | 6 | 39 |
| 1981–82 | Philadelphia Flyers | NHL | 9 | 7 | 5 | 12 | 47 | — | — | — | — | — |
| 1981–82 | Calgary Flames | NHL | 63 | 26 | 49 | 75 | 94 | 3 | 2 | 0 | 2 | 14 |
| 1982–83 | Calgary Flames | NHL | 79 | 19 | 31 | 50 | 103 | 9 | 3 | 4 | 7 | 33 |
| 1983–84 | New Jersey Devils | NHL | 79 | 23 | 38 | 61 | 121 | — | — | — | — | — |
| 1984–85 | New Jersey Devils | NHL | 80 | 22 | 39 | 61 | 105 | — | — | — | — | — |
| 1985–86 | New Jersey Devils | NHL | 78 | 23 | 40 | 63 | 80 | — | — | — | — | — |
| 1986–87 | New Jersey Devils | NHL | 51 | 8 | 31 | 39 | 80 | — | — | — | — | — |
| 1986–87 | Detroit Red Wings | NHL | 13 | 2 | 2 | 4 | 19 | 16 | 5 | 2 | 7 | 28 |
| 1987–88 | Adirondack Red Wings | AHL | 2 | 1 | 2 | 3 | 0 | — | — | — | — | — |
| 1987–88 | Detroit Red Wings | NHL | 57 | 6 | 11 | 17 | 42 | 16 | 4 | 1 | 5 | 12 |
| 1988–89 | Vancouver Canucks | NHL | 15 | 4 | 3 | 7 | 10 | 7 | 1 | 2 | 3 | 10 |
| NHL totals | | | 977 | 252 | 449 | 701 | 1,625 | 125 | 28 | 39 | 67 | 298 |

=== International ===
| Year | Team | Event | GP | G | A | Pts | PIM |
|---|---|---|---|---|---|---|---|
| 1975 | Canada | WJC | 5 | 1 | 4 | 5 | 9 |

== Awards ==
- Bob Brownridge Memorial Trophy (WCHL leading scorer) - 1975
- WCHL All-Star Team – 1975

| Preceded by Greg Joly | NHL first overall draft pick 1975 | Succeeded by Rick Green |
| Preceded by Bill Barber | Philadelphia Flyers' first-round draft pick 1975 | Succeeded by Mark Suzor |
| Preceded by Bobby Clarke | Philadelphia Flyers captain 1979–81 | Succeeded by Bill Barber |
| Preceded by Don Lever | New Jersey Devils captain 1984–87 | Succeeded by Kirk Muller |
| Preceded by Position created | General manager of the Ottawa Senators; 1992–1993 | Succeeded by Randy Sexton |
