= Norm Barnes =

Canadian ice hockey player (born 1953)

- Born: August 24, 1953 (age 72) Rexdale, Ontario, Canada
- Height: 6 ft 0 in (183 cm)
- Weight: 190 lb (86 kg; 13 st 8 lb)
- Position: Defence
- Shot: Left
- Played for: Philadelphia Flyers; Hartford Whalers
- National team: Canada
- NHL draft: 122nd overall, 1973; Philadelphia Flyers
- WHA draft: 91st overall, 1973; Cincinnati Stingers
- Playing career: 1974–1982

Norman Leonard Barnes (born August 24, 1953) is a Canadian former professional ice hockey defenceman who played five seasons in the National Hockey League (NHL) for the Philadelphia Flyers and Hartford Whalers. He featured in the 1980 Stanley Cup Finals with the Flyers.

He also played for Canada in the 1981 IIHF ice hockey world championships in Stockholm, Sweden.

As a youth, he played in the 1965 and 1966 Quebec International Pee-Wee Hockey Tournaments with the Toronto Bruins and Toronto Shopsy's minor ice hockey teams.

== Awards and honours ==
| Award | Year |
|---|---|
| All-WCHA First Team | 1973–74 |
| AHCA West All-American | 1973–74 |

- Played in NHL All-Star Game (1980)
- AHL First All-Star Team (1982)

== Career statistics ==
=== Regular season and playoffs ===
| | | | Regular season | | | | | Playoffs |
| Season | Team | League | GP | G | A | Pts | PIM | GP | G | A | Pts | PIM |
|---|---|---|---|---|---|---|---|---|---|---|---|---|
| 1971–72 | Michigan State University | WCHA | 33 | 5 | 16 | 21 | 68 | — | — | — | — | — |
| 1972–73 | Michigan State University | WCHA | 34 | 9 | 26 | 35 | 74 | — | — | — | — | — |
| 1973–74 | Michigan State University | WCHA | 37 | 8 | 56 | 64 | 107 | — | — | — | — | — |
| 1974–75 | Philadelphia Firebirds | NAHL | 18 | 4 | 6 | 10 | 38 | — | — | — | — | — |
| 1974–75 | Richmond Robins | AHL | 17 | 0 | 5 | 5 | 32 | 5 | 1 | 1 | 2 | 2 |
| 1975–76 | Richmond Robins | AHL | 67 | 2 | 7 | 9 | 74 | 8 | 0 | 0 | 0 | 2 |
| 1976–77 | Philadelphia Flyers | NHL | 1 | 0 | 0 | 0 | 0 | — | — | — | — | — |
| 1976–77 | Springfield Indians | AHL | 2 | 0 | 0 | 0 | 0 | — | — | — | — | — |
| 1976–77 | Baltimore Clippers | SHL | 46 | 5 | 27 | 32 | 90 | — | — | — | — | — |
| 1976–77 | Philadelphia Firebirds | NAHL | 22 | 3 | 18 | 21 | 27 | 4 | 1 | 1 | 2 | 7 |
| 1977–78 | Maine Mariners | AHL | 50 | 4 | 8 | 12 | 62 | 12 | 1 | 5 | 6 | 28 |
| 1978–79 | Maine Mariners | AHL | 67 | 9 | 21 | 30 | 108 | 10 | 3 | 3 | 6 | 19 |
| 1978–79 | Philadelphia Flyers | NHL | — | — | — | — | — | 2 | 0 | 0 | 0 | 0 |
| 1979–80 | Philadelphia Flyers | NHL | 59 | 4 | 21 | 25 | 59 | 10 | 0 | 0 | 0 | 8 |
| 1980–81 | Philadelphia Flyers | NHL | 22 | 0 | 3 | 3 | 18 | — | — | — | — | — |
| 1980–81 | Hartford Whalers | NHL | 54 | 1 | 10 | 11 | 82 | — | — | — | — | — |
| 1981–82 | Hartford Whalers | NHL | 20 | 1 | 4 | 5 | 19 | — | — | — | — | — |
| 1981–82 | Binghamton Whalers | AHL | 56 | 4 | 17 | 21 | 58 | 15 | 1 | 4 | 5 | 16 |
| AHL totals | | | 259 | 19 | 58 | 77 | 334 | 50 | 6 | 13 | 19 | 67 |
| NHL totals | | | 156 | 6 | 38 | 44 | 178 | 12 | 0 | 0 | 0 | 8 |

=== International ===
| Year | Team | Event | GP | G | A | Pts | PIM |
|---|---|---|---|---|---|---|---|
| 1981 | Canada | WC | 6 | 0 | 1 | 1 | 6 |
