= Larry Goodenough =

Canadian ice hockey player

- Born: January 19, 1953 (age 73) Toronto, Ontario, Canada
- Height: 6 ft 0 in (183 cm)
- Weight: 195 lb (88 kg; 13 st 13 lb)
- Position: Defence
- Shot: Right
- Played for: Philadelphia Flyers; Vancouver Canucks
- NHL draft: 20th overall, 1973; Philadelphia Flyers
- WHA draft: 15th overall, 1973; Chicago Cougars
- Playing career: 1973–1983

Lawrence J. Goodenough (born January 19, 1953) is a Canadian former professional ice hockey defenceman who played six seasons in the National Hockey League (NHL) for the Philadelphia Flyers and Vancouver Canucks. He won the Stanley Cup with Philadelphia in 1975.

== Playing career ==
Goodenough was drafted by the Philadelphia Flyers in the second round (20th overall) of the 1973 NHL Amateur Draft. He spent most of his first two professional seasons with the Richmond Robins, the Flyers' American Hockey League (AHL) affiliate. He was called up to the Flyers late in the 1974–75 season and paired with Ted Harris. Goodenough got his name engraved on the Stanley Cup as the Flyers won their second consecutive championship, defeating the Buffalo Sabres 4–2 in the Stanley Cup Final. Goodenough played in games four and five of the series, assisting on two second period goals in the latter.

The 1975–76 season was Goodenough's best NHL season, recording career highs across the board. He scored 8 goals and assisted on 34 others for a total of 42 points in 77 games. He also finished with a plus-minus of +45. The Flyers returned to the Final but were swept by the Montreal Canadiens in four games. Goodenough played in all 16 Flyers playoff games and set a then NHL rookie record for most points in a playoff season (14).

Midway through the 1976–77 season, the Flyers traded Goodenough and Jack McIlhargey to the Vancouver Canucks for Bob Dailey. He split the next three seasons between Vancouver and the Central Hockey League (CHL), seeing his last NHL action during the 1979–80 season. He signed with the Los Angeles Kings in October 1980 and spent a successful 1980–81 season with their International Hockey League (IHL) affiliate, the Saginaw Gears, winning the Turner Cup. Goodenough was awarded the Governor's Trophy as the league's most outstanding defenceman and was named to the IHL First All-Star Team.

After spending the 1981–82 season in the AHL with the New Haven Nighthawks, the Kings traded Goodenough along with a 1984 third-round draft pick to the Chicago Black Hawks for Terry Ruskowski. Goodenough played the rest of the 1982–83 season with the Binghamton Whalers and retired following the season.

== Post-playing career ==
Goodenough lives outside of Chalfont, Pennsylvania. He is currently Hockey Director at the Bucks County Ice Sports Center where he conducts clinics and classes to train young hockey players. He conducts skating, defense, shooting, passing, stickhandling and checking clinics weekly. He also administers and coaches the in-house youth program. In the summers, Goodenough and Frank Reago (owner of Frank's Hockey House) conduct summer camps for kids looking to enhance their knowledge of the game and to have fun.

Goodenough participated in the 2012 NHL Winter Classic Alumni Game at Citizens Bank Park.

== Awards and honours ==
- Governor's Trophy (Outstanding Defenceman, IHL) (1980–81)
- IHL First All-Star Team (1980–81)
- Stanley Cup champion (1974–75)
- Turner Cup champion (1980–81)

== Career statistics ==
=== Regular season and playoffs ===
			Regular season					Playoffs
Season	Team	League	GP	G	A	Pts	PIM	GP	G	A	Pts	PIM
1970–71	Toronto Marlboros	OHA	—	—	—	—	—	1	0	0	0	0
1971–72	Toronto Marlboros	OHA	62	3	35	38	61	10	2	6	8	10
1972–73	London Knights	OHA	59	15	51	66	153	10	2	7	9	10
1973–74	Richmond Robins	AHL	75	11	22	33	54	5	2	2	4	0
1974–75	Richmond Robins	AHL	57	10	40	50	76	—	—	—	—	—
1974–75	Philadelphia Flyers	NHL	20	3	9	12	0	5	0	4	4	2
1975–76	Philadelphia Flyers	NHL	77	8	34	42	83	16	3	11	14	6
1976–77	Philadelphia Flyers	NHL	32	4	13	17	21	—	—	—	—	—
1976–77	Vancouver Canucks	NHL	30	2	4	6	27	—	—	—	—	—
1977–78	Vancouver Canucks	NHL	42	1	6	7	28	—	—	—	—	—
1977–78	Tulsa Oilers	CHL	32	5	18	23	26	5	0	3	3	11
1978–79	Vancouver Canucks	NHL	36	4	9	13	18	1	0	0	0	2
1978–79	Dallas Black Hawks	CHL	31	3	16	19	23	—	—	—	—	—
1979–80	Vancouver Canucks	NHL	5	0	2	2	2	—	—	—	—	—
1979–80	Dallas Black Hawks	CHL	73	4	34	38	55	—	—	—	—	—
1980–81	Houston Apollos	CHL	13	2	3	5	2	—	—	—	—	—
1980–81	Saginaw Gears	IHL	54	10	43	53	32	13	1	12	13	20
1981–82	New Haven Nighthawks	AHL	76	3	27	30	60	2	0	1	1	9
1982–83	New Haven Nighthawks	AHL	1	0	0	0	0	—	—	—	—	—
1982–83	Binghamton Whalers	AHL	58	1	15	16	36	3	0	0	0	2
AHL totals			267	25	104	129	226	10	2	3	5	11
CHL totals			149	14	71	85	106	5	0	3	3	11
NHL totals			242	22	77	99	179	22	3	15	18	10
