= Bob Dailey =

Canadian ice hockey player (1953–2016)

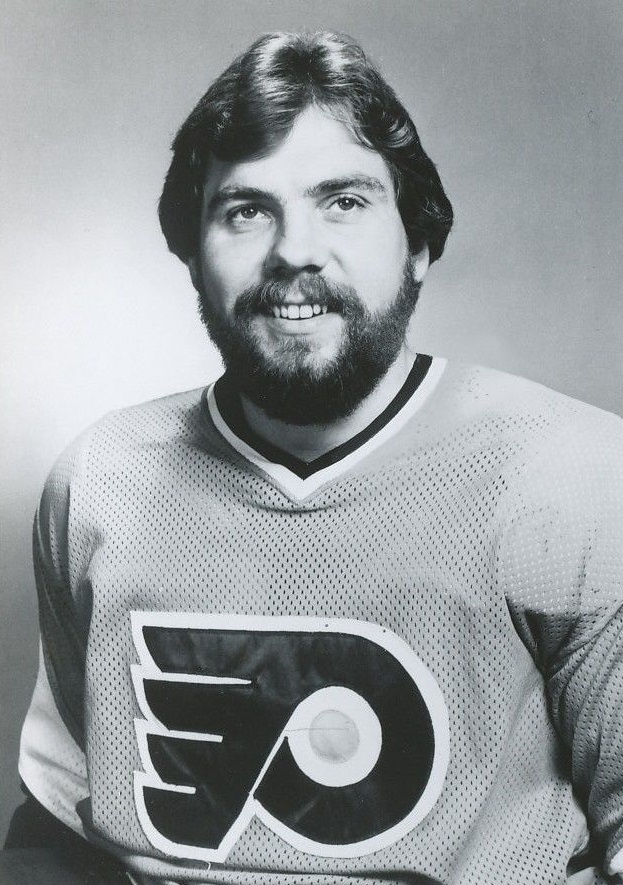
- Dailey in 1980
- Born: May 3, 1953 Kingston, Ontario, Canada
- Died: September 7, 2016 (aged 63) Windermere, Florida, U.S.
- Height: 6 ft 5 in (196 cm)
- Weight: 220 lb (100 kg; 15 st 10 lb)
- Position: Defence
- Shot: Right
- Played for: Vancouver Canucks; Philadelphia Flyers
- NHL draft: 9th overall, 1973; Vancouver Canucks
- WHA draft: 52nd overall, 1973; Toronto Toros
- Playing career: 1973–1982

Robert Scott Dailey (May 3, 1953 – September 7, 2016) was a Canadian professional ice hockey defenceman who played nine seasons in the National Hockey League (NHL) with the Vancouver Canucks and Philadelphia Flyers between 1973 and 1982. He featured in the 1980 Stanley Cup Finals with the Flyers.

== Playing career ==
The league's tallest player until the arrival of Willie Huber in 1978, Dailey was a tremendous combination of size and skill on the blueline. He was selected ninth overall by the Vancouver Canucks in the 1973 NHL Amateur Draft from the Toronto Marlboros, where he had won the Memorial Cup as a junior. He immediately stepped into the Canucks roster as one of their top defenders, registering 7 goals and 24 points as a rookie in 1973–74.

In 1974–75, Dailey registered 12 goals and 48 points to lead Canuck defenders and was named the club's top blueliner. He had another fine season in 1975–76, notching 15 goals despite missing time to injury. However, the Canucks would deal him to the Philadelphia Flyers midway through the 1976–77 season in exchange for Jack McIlhargey and Larry Goodenough. The deal would prove a lopsided one as McIlhargey and Goodenough were never more than bit players for the Canucks while Dailey would be the Flyers' top defender for the next 5 years.

In 1977–78, Dailey emerged as a star for the Flyers. His 21 goals and 57 points would set club records (now broken) for a defenceman, and he was selected to play in the NHL All-Star Game. In 1979–80 he would register 39 points in just 61 games, and then add 17 more points in the playoffs in helping the Flyers reach the Stanley Cup Finals. In 1980–81 he was again named the Flyers' top defenceman and was selected to play in his second All-Star Game, but his season was ended prematurely due to a knee injury which required surgery.

12 games into the 1981–82 season, Dailey shattered his ankle catching a rut in the ice in a game in Buffalo. The injury required 3 screws to repair and forced his retirement at the age of 28. He attempted a comeback with the Hershey Bears of the American Hockey League in 1985, but found he could not compete and retired for good after five games.

Dailey finished his career with 94 goals and 231 assists for 325 points in 561 NHL games, along with 814 penalty minutes.

Dailey died in Florida on September 7, 2016, after a six-year battle with cancer.

== Awards and achievements ==
- 1975: Named Vancouver Canucks' top defenceman
- 1978: Played in NHL All-Star Game
- 1979: Named Philadelphia Flyers' top defenceman
- 1981: Played in NHL All-Star Game
- 1981: Named Philadelphia Flyers' top defenceman

== Career statistics ==
=== Regular season and playoffs ===
| | | | Regular season | | | | | Playoffs |
| Season | Team | League | GP | G | A | Pts | PIM | GP | G | A | Pts | PIM |
|---|---|---|---|---|---|---|---|---|---|---|---|---|
| 1970–71 | Markham Waxers | MetJHL | — | — | — | — | — | — | — | — | — | — |
| 1970–71 | Toronto Marlboros | OHA-Jr. | 36 | 2 | 3 | 5 | 36 | — | — | — | — | — |
| 1971–72 | Toronto Marlboros | OHA-Jr. | 62 | 23 | 55 | 78 | 124 | 10 | 3 | 7 | 10 | 18 |
| 1972–73 | Toronto Marlboros | OHA-Jr. | 60 | 9 | 55 | 64 | 200 | 16 | 9 | 11 | 20 | 22 |
| 1972–73 | Toronto Marlboros | M-Cup | — | — | — | — | — | 3 | 0 | 1 | 1 | 19 |
| 1973–74 | Vancouver Canucks | NHL | 76 | 7 | 17 | 24 | 143 | — | — | — | — | — |
| 1974–75 | Vancouver Canucks | NHL | 70 | 12 | 36 | 48 | 103 | 5 | 1 | 3 | 4 | 14 |
| 1975–76 | Vancouver Canucks | NHL | 67 | 15 | 24 | 39 | 119 | 2 | 1 | 1 | 2 | 0 |
| 1976–77 | Vancouver Canucks | NHL | 44 | 4 | 16 | 20 | 52 | — | — | — | — | — |
| 1976–77 | Philadelphia Flyers | NHL | 32 | 5 | 14 | 19 | 38 | 10 | 4 | 9 | 13 | 15 |
| 1977–78 | Philadelphia Flyers | NHL | 76 | 21 | 36 | 57 | 62 | 12 | 1 | 5 | 6 | 22 |
| 1978–79 | Philadelphia Flyers | NHL | 70 | 9 | 30 | 39 | 63 | 8 | 1 | 2 | 3 | 14 |
| 1979–80 | Philadelphia Flyers | NHL | 61 | 13 | 26 | 39 | 71 | 19 | 4 | 13 | 17 | 22 |
| 1980–81 | Philadelphia Flyers | NHL | 53 | 7 | 27 | 34 | 141 | 7 | 0 | 1 | 1 | 18 |
| 1981–82 | Philadelphia Flyers | NHL | 12 | 1 | 5 | 6 | 22 | — | — | — | — | — |
| 1985–86 | Hershey Bears | AHL | 5 | 0 | 0 | 0 | 8 | — | — | — | — | — |
| NHL totals | | | 561 | 94 | 231 | 325 | 814 | 63 | 12 | 34 | 46 | 105 |

| Preceded by Dennis Ververgaert | Vancouver Canucks first-round draft pick 1974 | Succeeded by Rick Blight |
