= Goodenough baronets =

Baronetcy in the Baronetage of the United Kingdom

The Goodenough Baronetcy, of Broadwell and Filkins in the Oxfordshire, is a title in the Baronetage of the United Kingdom. It was created on 19 January 1943 for William Goodenough, Chairman of Barclay's Bank and of the Nuffield Foundation. As of 2010 the title is held by his grandson, the third Baronet, who succeeded his father in 1996.

== Goodenough baronets, of Broadwell and Filkins (1943) ==
- Sir William Macnamara Goodenough, 1st Baronet (1899–1951)
- Sir Richard Edmund Goodenough, 2nd Baronet (1925–1996)
- Sir William McLernon Goodenough, 3rd Baronet (born 1954)

The heir apparent is the present holder's son Samuel William Hector Goodenough (born 1992).
