= Fred Williams (ice hockey) =

Canadian ice hockey player (born 1956)

- Born: July 1, 1956 (age 69) Saskatoon, Saskatchewan, Canada
- Height: 5 ft 11 in (180 cm)
- Weight: 190 lb (86 kg; 13 st 8 lb)
- Position: Centre
- Shot: Left
- Played for: Detroit Red Wings
- NHL draft: 4th overall, 1976; Detroit Red Wings
- WHA draft: 26th overall, 1976; New England Whalers
- Playing career: 1976–1982

Frederick Richard Williams (born July 1, 1956) is a Canadian former professional ice hockey centre. He was drafted in the 1st round (4th overall) by the Detroit Red Wings in the 1976 NHL draft and 26th overall in the third round of the World Hockey Association draft, by the Hartford Whalers. Williams played in only 44 games at the NHL level. He is the older brother of former NHL player Gord Williams.

== Hockey career ==
=== Major Junior Hockey ===
An explosive skater with outstanding stick-handling skill, Fred Williams began his career towards the pro ranks as a 15-year-old in major junior hockey in the Western Canada Hockey League as a centre for his hometown Saskatoon Blades in the 1971–72 season. It was unusual for players of Williams' age to play in the major junior ranks in particular, because of size and experience of older players who were ultimately seeking draft positions in the NHL or at the time, the World Hockey Association. Only one other player on the club, Ralph Klassen was 15 years old, and was selected at #3 overall in 1975 NHL draft. However, Williams, being younger than the majority of players he played with and against in the WCHL, had unusual skills and size for his age, and was selected for the Saskatoon Blades roster for the 1971-72 season, after his first training camp. The previous year, he had been playing Midget hockey in Saskatoon. Despite his recognized talent by the Blades coaching staff, Williams put up mediocre statistics in his first two seasons in the WCHL with only 41 points in a 121 games. However, in the following three seasons as he became a more experienced player and gained more size, Williams would score 36, 70, and 118 points. His efforts guided the Saskatoon Blades to two trips to the playoffs, driving the Blades to the league finals two years in a row, with 63 total playoff points over 37 games. Despite having some marquee players that season, Saskatoon would not win the championship and to this day, still have not won a WHL championship cup. During the 1975-76 WCHL season, Williams was one of the top assist getters in the WCHL with 87, only behind the likes of top players such as Bernie Federko who would go on to illustrious success in the NHL ranks. During his draft year, Williams' excellent skating ability, his solid hockey sense and a consistent scoring touch, he attracted the attention of the Detroit Red Wings, who opted to draft Williams as their first round pick, fourth to be selected overall, in the 1976 NHL draft. The same year, the World Hockey Association's Hartford Whalers drafted Williams 26th overall, in the third round of their draft. The disparity between the NHL's Red Wings' and the WHA's Whalers' draft positions for Williams would guide him to accept a contract offer and an almost guaranteed roster spot on the Red Wings for the 1976-77 NHL season.

=== NHL Debut and Minor leagues ===
In the fall of 1976, Williams attended his first NHL training camp with his draft club, the Detroit Red Wings. Despite Williams strong training camp showing for a player directly out of major junior hockey, Alex Delvecchio, then coach of the Red Wings, along with his coaching staff, opted to send Williams to the minors for more professional experience to hone is game and develop his readiness to enter the National Hockey League. He then started the 1976–77 season with the Rhode Island Reds of the American Hockey League but due to injuries on the Red Wings, he was quickly called up to the big club on October 7, 1976. Expectations from the Wings and the NHL for Williams debut were high as a first round draft pick, and he did not disappoint. He scored his first goal in his first NHL game against the Washington Capitals. The Red Wings, who were playing in one of their most historically dismal seasons with only 16 wins over 80 games, decided to keep Williams up with the team for the remaining 43 games of the regular season, to allow him to gain more NHL experience, as the Red Wings would not make the playoffs. However, in disappointing fashion during his chance to impress Red Wings brass, Williams went on to score only six points in those remaining games in '76-'77 and was subsequently sent down to the Wing's minor league affiliates for the following season on a conditioning stint. Detroit felt that his play was not up to NHL standards, and in spite of his high draft selection and the high expectations which befall a first rounder, he was not contributing to the same level as the likes of Bernie Federko or Don Murdoch who were drafted later than Williams and were having spectacular NHL seasons. Williams continued to flounder while playing for Detroit's minor affiliate Kansas City Red Wings of the Central Hockey League, even trying to play as a defenceman to see if his game and play-making would turn around. However, Williams did not improve and was waived and then released outright by the Red Wings organization at the end of the season. At this time, feeling his heart was not in the game, he decided to retire for the first time in his career. Since he was no longer under contract to Detroit and was a free agent, Williams reconsidered his retirement, and was quickly enticed out of retirement by an attractive offer from the Philadelphia Firebirds of the AHL on September 15, 1979. He played in 35 games for the Firebirds where he scored only 5 goals and contributed 11 assists before being traded to the league leading Maine Mariners. He played is final three seasons for the Mariners scoring 51, 55, and 32 points respectively. Without any NHL suitors for his talents, Williams decided to retire after the 1981–82 season. Unfortunately, Fred Williams garners a distinction among others, to be one of the biggest draft busts in NHL history, never rising to a level of talent or consistency in his game which would have allowed him to play a long career in the NHL. Fred Williams currently resides in Western Canada with his family.

== Career statistics ==
			Regular season					Playoffs
Season	Team	League	GP	G	A	Pts	PIM	GP	G	A	Pts	PIM
1971–72	Saskatoon Blades	WCHL	54	7	9	16	6	8	0	3	3	0
1972–73	Saskatoon Blades	WCHL	67	7	18	25	24	16	1	1	2	6
1973–74	Saskatoon Blades	WCHL	67	16	20	36	46	6	1	2	3	0
1974–75	Saskatoon Blades	WCHL	59	21	49	70	61	17	8	16	24	43
1975–76	Saskatoon Blades	WCHL	72	31	87	118	129	20	7	20	27	20
1976–77	Detroit Red Wings	NHL	44	2	5	7	10	—	—	—	—	—
1976–77	Rhode Island Reds	AHL	34	7	19	26	24	—	—	—	—	—
1977–78	Kansas City Red Wings	CHL	32	0	6	6	12	—	—	—	—	—
1977–78	Philadelphia Firebirds	AHL	35	5	11	16	22	4	2	3	5	2
1979–80	Maine Mariners	AHL	73	17	34	51	26	12	5	13	18	8
1980–81	Maine Mariners	AHL	79	21	34	55	78	20	8	8	16	20
1981–82	Maine Mariners	AHL	46	6	26	32	44	3	0	0	0	2
NHL totals			44	2	5	7	10	—	—	—	—	—
AHL totals			267	56	124	180	194	39	15	23	39	32

Preceded by Rick Lapointe	Detroit Red Wings first-round draft pick 1976	Succeeded by Dale McCourt
