= Rob Flockhart =

Canadian ice hockey player (1956–2021)

- Born: February 6, 1956 Smithers, British Columbia, Canada
- Died: January 2, 2021 (aged 64)
- Height: 6 ft 0 in (183 cm)
- Weight: 185 lb (84 kg; 13 st 3 lb)
- Position: Left wing
- Shot: Left
- Played for: Vancouver Canucks; Minnesota North Stars
- NHL draft: 44th overall, 1976; Vancouver Canucks
- WHA draft: 63rd overall, 1976; Cleveland Crusaders
- Playing career: 1976–1981

Robert Walter Flockhart (February 6, 1956 – January 2, 2021) was a Canadian professional ice hockey player who spent parts of five seasons in the National Hockey League with the Vancouver Canucks and Minnesota North Stars, though most of his career was spent in the minor leagues. Internationally Flockhart played at the 1975 World Junior Championships, an unofficial tournament. He is the older brother of former NHL player Ron Flockhart.

== Playing career ==
Flockhart was born in Smithers, British Columbia, and began playing hockey there. He joined the Kamloops Chiefs of the major junior Western Canada Hockey League in 1973, spending three seasons with the team. At the 1976 NHL Amateur Draft Flockhart was selected 44th overall by the Vancouver Canucks. He had a solid first professional season in 1976–77, scoring 54 points in 65 games with the Tulsa Oilers of the Central Hockey League, and earning a five-game stint in Vancouver. He would spend three seasons in Vancouver's organization, scoring well in minor-pro but struggling to produce when called up to the parent club. His longest NHL stint came in 1977–78, when he appeared in 24 games, recording a single assist. He appeared in 14 games in 1978–79, scoring his first NHL goal and adding an assist.

Flockhart was released by the Canucks in 1979 and signed with the Minnesota North Stars. He led the Oklahoma City Stars in scoring in 1979–80, and scored a goal and 4 points in 10 games with the North Stars. He also scored a goal in his NHL playoff debut. He spent two more seasons in Minnesota's system, appearing in two more NHL games in 1980–81, but failed to establish himself as a full-time NHL player. He signed with the Chicago Black Hawks in 1982, but never appeared in the NHL with the Hawks, retiring from the sport in 1985.

Flockhart finished his career with 2 goals and 5 assists for 7 points, along with 14 penalty minutes, in 55 NHL games. He retired as the first player to have scored a goal in the only postseason game they ever played. He died of a heart attack on January 2, 2021.

== Career statistics ==
=== Regular season and playoffs ===
| | | | Regular season | | | | | Playoffs |
| Season | Team | League | GP | G | A | Pts | PIM | GP | G | A | Pts | PIM |
|---|---|---|---|---|---|---|---|---|---|---|---|---|
| 1971–72 | Revelstoke Bruins | KIJHL | 44 | 41 | 47 | 88 | 54 | — | — | — | — | — |
| 1972–73 | The Pas Blue Devils | AJHL | 50 | 35 | 45 | 80 | 92 | — | — | — | — | — |
| 1973–74 | Kamloops Chiefs | WCHL | 67 | 13 | 16 | 29 | 49 | — | — | — | — | — |
| 1974–75 | Kamloops Chiefs | WCHL | 36 | 19 | 20 | 39 | 52 | — | — | — | — | — |
| 1975–76 | Kamloops Chiefs | WCHL | 72 | 51 | 47 | 98 | 91 | 11 | 3 | 9 | 12 | 32 |
| 1976–77 | Tulsa Oilers | CHL | 65 | 22 | 32 | 54 | 70 | 9 | 2 | 6 | 8 | 12 |
| 1976–77 | Vancouver Canucks | NHL | 5 | 0 | 0 | 0 | 0 | — | — | — | — | — |
| 1977–78 | Tulsa Oilers | CHL | 43 | 17 | 11 | 28 | 55 | 7 | 2 | 3 | 5 | 14 |
| 1977–78 | Vancouver Canucks | NHL | 24 | 0 | 1 | 1 | 12 | — | — | — | — | — |
| 1978–79 | Dallas Black Hawks | CHL | 44 | 18 | 27 | 45 | 46 | 9 | 3 | 3 | 6 | 34 |
| 1978–79 | Vancouver Canucks | NHL | 14 | 1 | 1 | 2 | 0 | — | — | — | — | — |
| 1979–80 | Oklahoma City Stars | CHL | 67 | 31 | 40 | 71 | 51 | — | — | — | — | — |
| 1979–80 | Minnesota North Stars | NHL | 10 | 1 | 3 | 4 | 2 | 1 | 1 | 0 | 1 | 2 |
| 1980–81 | Minnesota North Stars | NHL | 2 | 0 | 0 | 0 | 0 | — | — | — | — | — |
| 1981–82 | Nashville South Stars | CHL | 79 | 27 | 30 | 57 | 98 | 3 | 0 | 0 | 0 | 2 |
| 1982–83 | Springfield Indians | AHL | 74 | 22 | 34 | 56 | 55 | — | — | — | — | — |
| 1983–84 | Toledo Goaldiggers | IHL | 54 | 33 | 20 | 53 | 33 | — | — | — | — | — |
| 1984–85 | New Haven Nighthawks | AHL | 2 | 0 | 2 | 2 | 0 | — | — | — | — | — |
| 1984–85 | Springfield Indians | AHL | 14 | 5 | 8 | 13 | 22 | — | — | — | — | — |
| CHL totals | | | 373 | 148 | 182 | 330 | 409 | 31 | 7 | 13 | 20 | 68 |
| NHL totals | | | 55 | 2 | 5 | 7 | 14 | 1 | 1 | 0 | 1 | 2 |

=== International ===
| Year | Team | Event | GP | G | A | Pts | PIM |
|---|---|---|---|---|---|---|---|
| 1975 | Canada | WJC | 4 | 1 | 0 | 1 | 6 |
| Junior totals | | | 4 | 1 | 0 | 1 | 6 |
