= Rick Hodgson =

Canadian ice hockey player

- Born: May 23, 1956 (age 68); Medicine Hat, Alberta, Canada
- Height: 6 ft 0 in (183 cm)
- Weight: 180 lb (82 kg; 12 st 12 lb)
- Position: Defence
- Shot: Right
- Played for: Hartford Whalers
- NHL draft: 46th overall, 1976; Atlanta Flames
- WHA draft: 65th overall, 1976; San Diego Mariners
- Playing career: 1976–1980

Richard S. Hodgson (born May 23, 1956) is a Canadian former professional ice hockey defenceman. He played 6 games for the Hartford Whalers during the 1979–80 season.

== Career statistics ==
=== Regular season and playoffs ===
			Regular season					Playoffs
Season	Team	League	GP	G	A	Pts	PIM	GP	G	A	Pts	PIM
1971–72	Kamloops Rockets	BCJHL	59	8	13	21	128	—	—	—	—	—
1972–73	Kamloops Rockets	BCJHL	—	—	—	—	—	—	—	—	—	—
1973–74	Calgary Centennials	WCHL	65	8	44	52	174	14	1	9	10	34
1974–75	Calgary Centennials	WCHL	56	7	36	43	221	—	—	—	—	—
1975–76	Calgary Centennials	WCHL	50	7	48	55	168	—	—	—	—	—
1976–77	Tulsa Oilers	CHL	62	3	18	21	101	6	0	0	0	6
1977–78	Tulsa Oilers	CHL	76	7	20	27	180	7	0	3	3	19
1978–79	Tulsa Oilers	CHL	75	9	17	26	167	—	—	—	—	—
1979–80	Springfield Indians	AHL	75	7	26	33	186	—	—	—	—	—
1979–80	Hartford Whalers	NHL	6	0	0	0	6	1	0	0	0	0
1980–81	Kamloops Cowboys	BCSHL	—	—	—	—	—	—	—	—	—	—
AHL totals			245	59	98	157	494	23	5	6	11	57
CHL totals			213	19	55	74	448	13	0	3	3	25
NHL totals			6	0	0	0	6	1	0	0	0	0

=== International ===
Year	Team	Event	GP	G	A	Pts	PIM
1975	Canada	WJC	3	0	1	1	0
Junior totals			3	0	1	1	0
