= Alain Bélanger =

Canadian ice hockey player

- Born: January 18, 1956 (age 69); St. Janvier, Quebec, Canada
- Height: 6 ft 0 in (183 cm)
- Weight: 190 lb (86 kg; 13 st 8 lb)
- Position: Right Wing
- Shot: Right
- Played for: Toronto Maple Leafs
- NHL draft: 48th overall, 1976; Toronto Maple Leafs
- WHA draft: 43rd overall, 1976; Calgary Cowboys
- Playing career: 1977–1983

Alain "Bam-Bam" Bélanger (born January 18, 1956) is a Canadian former professional hockey player. He played 9 games with the Toronto Maple Leafs of the National Hockey League during the 1977–78 season, recording one assist. The next two seasons, he played in the American Hockey League with the New Brunswick Hawks, racking up 12 goals and 40 points in 76 games. He then retired for two years before returning for the 1982–83 season to play with the Sherbrooke Jets; however, he accrued no points in 21 games.

== Career statistics ==
=== Regular season and playoffs ===
			Regular season					Playoffs
Season	Team	League	GP	G	A	Pts	PIM	GP	G	A	Pts	PIM
1973–74	Sainte-Therese Volants	QJHL-B	—	—	—	—	—	—	—	—	—	—
1974–75	Sherbrooke Castors	QMJHL	51	17	18	35	342	12	4	5	9	101
1974–75	Sherbrooke Castors	M-Cup	—	—	—	—	—	3	0	0	0	27
1975–76	Sherbrooke Castors	QMJHL	65	26	25	51	289	17	7	4	11	65
1976–77	Dallas Black Hawks	CHL	30	16	10	26	149	—	—	—	—	—
1977–78	Toronto Maple Leafs	CHL	9	0	1	1	6	—	—	—	—	—
1977–78	Dallas Black Hawks	CHL	61	7	16	23	262	12	1	4	5	44
1978–79	New Brunswick Hawks	AHL	57	8	12	20	197	5	1	0	1	2
1979–80	New Brunswick Hawks	AHL	49	4	16	20	120	—	—	—	—	—
1982–83	Sherbrooke Jets	AHL	21	0	0	0	79	—	—	—	—	—
AHL totals			127	12	28	40	396	5	1	0	1	2
NHL totals			9	0	1	1	6	—	—	—	—	—

=== International ===
Year	Team	Event	GP	G	A	Pts	PIM
1976	Canada	WJC	4	0	0	0	0
Junior totals			4	0	0	0	0
