= Jeff McDill =

Canadian ice hockey player (1956–2012)

- Born: March 16, 1956 Thunder Bay, Ontario, Canada
- Died: November 3, 2012 (aged 56) Swan River, Manitoba, Canada
- Height: 5 ft 10 in (178 cm)
- Weight: 189 lb (86 kg; 13 st 7 lb)
- Position: Right wing
- Shot: Right
- Played for: Chicago Black Hawks
- NHL draft: 27th overall, 1976; Chicago Black Hawks
- WHA draft: 27th overall, 1976; Cleveland Crusaders
- Playing career: 1976–1980

Jeffrey Donald McDill (March 16, 1956 – November 3, 2012) was a Canadian professional ice hockey right winger who played in one National Hockey League game for the Chicago Black Hawks during the 1976–77 season, on March 12, 1977 against the Montreal Canadiens. The rest of his career, which lasted from 1976 to 1980, was spent in the minor leagues. He died aged 56 on November 3, 2012. McDill was born in Thunder Bay, Ontario.

== Career statistics ==
=== Regular season and playoffs ===
			Regular season					Playoffs
Season	Team	League	GP	G	A	Pts	PIM	GP	G	A	Pts	PIM
1972–73	Dauphin Kings	MJHL	48	16	17	33	143	—	—	—	—	—
1973–74	Flin Flon Bombers	WCHL	66	22	14	36	86	7	3	3	6	13
1974–75	Flin Flon Bombers	WCHL	46	24	44	68	75	—	—	—	—	—
1975–76	Victoria Cougars	WCHL	72	55	66	121	197	15	8	9	17	42
1976–77	Chicago Black Hawks	NHL	1	0	0	0	0	—	—	—	—	—
1976–77	Dallas Black Hawks	CHL	1	0	0	0	0	—	—	—	—	—
1976–77	Flint Generals	IHL	74	31	39	70	42	5	0	1	1	5
1977–78	Maine Mariners	AHL	4	1	1	2	5	—	—	—	—	—
1977–78	Kalamazoo Wings	IHL	14	1	5	6	20	—	—	—	—	—
1977–78	Muskegon Mohawks	IHL	47	18	25	43	28	6	1	4	5	0
1978–79	New Haven Nighthawks	AHL	71	24	26	50	75	10	5	7	12	12
1979–80	New Haven Nighthawks	AHL	75	27	36	63	61	10	5	0	5	20
AHL totals			150	52	63	115	141	20	10	7	17	32
IHL totals			135	50	69	119	90	11	1	5	6	5
NHL totals			1	0	0	0	0	—	—	—	—	—

== See also ==
- List of players who played only one game in the NHL
