= Bernie Federko =

Canadian ice hockey player (born 1956)

- Hockey Hall of Fame, 2002
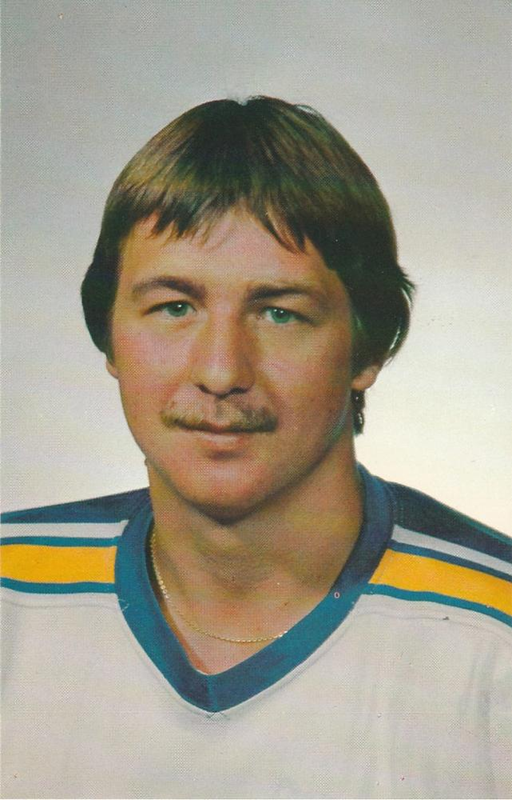
- Federko with the St. Louis Blues in 1978
- Born: May 12, 1956 (age 70) Foam Lake, Saskatchewan, Canada
- Height: 6 ft 0 in (183 cm)
- Weight: 195 lb (88 kg; 13 st 13 lb)
- Position: Centre
- Shot: Left
- Played for: St. Louis Blues; Detroit Red Wings
- NHL draft: 7th overall, 1976; St. Louis Blues
- WHA draft: 6th overall, 1976; Edmonton Oilers
- Playing career: 1976–1990

Bernard Allan Federko (born May 12, 1956) is a Canadian former professional ice hockey player who was a centre for fourteen seasons in the National Hockey League (NHL) from 1976 through 1990.

As a youth in Saskatchewan, Federko excelled in midget and minor league hockey, which included setting records for the Saskatoon Blades of the Western Canadian Hockey League (WCHL). He was drafted by both the NHL and WHA in 1976 and chose to sign with the former's St. Louis Blues. He split time between the minor league and the NHL team for his first season, recording 23 points in 31 games before staying in the NHL for the rest of his career. From 1978 to 1988, Federko recorded ten consecutive seasons with 50 assists each, the first time this had occurred in NHL history. He also recorded six 30-goal seasons and four 100-point seasons along with a career-high 41 goals in the 1983-84 season. In 1988, he became the 22nd NHL player to record 1,000 points and months later was named team captain, the 8th in team history. He was traded to the Detroit Red Wings in 1989 and recorded 57 points in 73 games, with his final game being his 1,000th played.

In 1,000 games, he recorded 1,130 total points and was named to the NHL All-Star Game twice. He had his number retired in 1991 and was inducted into the Hockey Hall of Fame in 2002.

== Early life ==
Federko was born on May 12, 1956, in Foam Lake, Saskatchewan, to parents Nick and Natalie. He grew up alongside his twin older brothers Don and Ron, and his younger brother Ken. As he is of Ukrainian descent, his family attended the local Ukrainian Catholic Church and Federko served as an altar boy.

== Playing career ==
=== Amateur ===
Growing up in Saskatchewan, Federko played midget and minor hockey for Foam Lake and nearby town teams. He competed with the Foam Lake Flyers of the Saskatchewan Amateur Hockey Association in 1972–73 before joining the Saskatoon Blades of the Western Canadian Hockey League (WCHL). Despite being too young to join the Blades, Federko's local priest convinced Blades head coach Jack McLeod to let Federko try out for the team. While McLeod planned on cutting him numerous times, Federko impressed him enough to be named to their 1973–74 roster. As his family wished to save money, Federko was also playing with skates two sizes too big for him.

As a rookie with the Blades, Federko was placed on the third line with fellow Ukrainian Canadians Ron Valade and Neil Hawryliw. He scored 16 goals and 20 assists through his first 36 games of the 1973–74 season. However, he soon experienced a scoring slump and went 17 games without a goal through February and March. Despite this, Federko finished his rookie season with 22 goals and 50 points. Before his sophomore season with the Blades, Federko completed his high school education at E. D. Feehan Catholic High School. He then enrolled in three first-year courses at the University of Saskatchewan during the 1974–75.

Federko significantly improved upon his rookie season, finishing with 39 goals and 68 assists. He recorded his first WCHL hat-trick on November 12, 1974, against the Regina Pats. However, he subsequently missed two weeks of game play due to a broken hand, slightly dislocated shoulder, and a strained knee. Despite this, he led the team with 44 points through their first 28 games. By February, he ranked sixth in the WCHL with 29 goals and 52 assists. Federko recorded his third WCHL hat-trick on March 9 to help the Blades clinch the Eastern Division Championship title. He finished the season with 39 goals and 68 assists as he helped the Blades qualify for the WHL Championship against the New Westminster Bruins.

Federko set numerous league and franchise records in his final season with the Blades, including breaking Bobby Clarke's WCHL record. On March 9, 1976, Federko recorded five points against the Edmonton Oil Kings to tie Bobby Clarke WCHL single-season scoring record. He also broke the Blades' single-season assist record set by Orest Kindrachuk. By the end of March, Federko broke Clarke's record for most points in a season with 72 goals and 115 assists for 187 points. He subsequently ended the season with numerous single-season records for the Blades, including their all-time single-season goals, assists, and points. In the playoffs, he set new franchise and league records for assists, points, power-play goals, and short-handed goals. He also tied Ralph Klassen's single-game points record after recording five assists against the Kamloops Chiefs. As a result of his accomplishments, Federko was named the WCHL's most valuable player.

=== St. Louis Blues (1976–1989) ===
==== Rookie season and early struggles (1976–1978) ====
Following his career-best season, Federko was drafted 7th overall by the St. Louis Blues in the 1976 NHL Amateur Draft. He was also drafted by the Edmonton Oilers in the 1976 WHA amateur draft. Federko chose to forgo the WHL and signed a four-year NHL contract with the Blues in early July. During the offseason, Federko broke a small bone in his foot but recovered in time for the Blues' training camp. However, Blues head coach Emile Francis still used him sparingly during their exhibition games. Federko was subsequently assigned to the Blues' Central Hockey League (CHL) affiliate, the Kansas City Blues, for the 1976–77 season. Part of the reason for this assignment was due to Francis' unwillingness to play rookies.

Upon joining the Kansas City Blues, Federko was placed on a line with Brian Sutter and right winger Rick Bourbonnais. He recorded his first professional hat-trick on October 27 while with the Kansas City Blues. By November 11, he ranked second in league scoring with eight goals and 12 assists. He was called up to the NHL level on December 20 and made his NHL debut on December 22 against the Colorado Rockies. Federko played five games at the NHL level before being returned to the CHL. Despite missing a few games, Federko continued to lead the CHL in scoring upon his return and recorded 60 points through his first 25 CHL games.

Due to the St. Louis Blues' losing record, Federko, Sutter, and Bourbonnais were called up to the NHL level in February and remained on a line together. Federko scored his first NHL goal and assist on February 3, 1977, against the Boston Bruins. He recorded his first NHL hat-trick two days later against the Buffalo Sabres on February 5. Later that month, Federko recorded his second career NHL hat-trick in a 4–1 win over the Washington Capitals. He recorded eight goals through his first eight games and began to be used on the team's power-play. His final hat-trick of the season occurred on April 2 against the Cleveland Barons. Federko finished the regular season with 14 goals to help lead the Blues to the 1977 Stanley Cup playoffs against the Montreal Canadiens. Despite finishing the regular season in the NHL, Federko was named the CHL's Rookie of the Year.

Federko began the 1977–78 season with four goals through his first 54 games before Leo Boivin was replaced with Kansas City coach Barclay Plager. His scoring issues were compounded by a shoulder separation and knee injury, which required him to play with a brace. Following Plager's promotion, Federko scored two goals to snap the Blues' franchise-record 12-game losing streak. In the final 26 games of the season under Plager, he scored 13 goals and 10 assists.

==== Breakout seasons and All-Star selections (1978–1983) ====
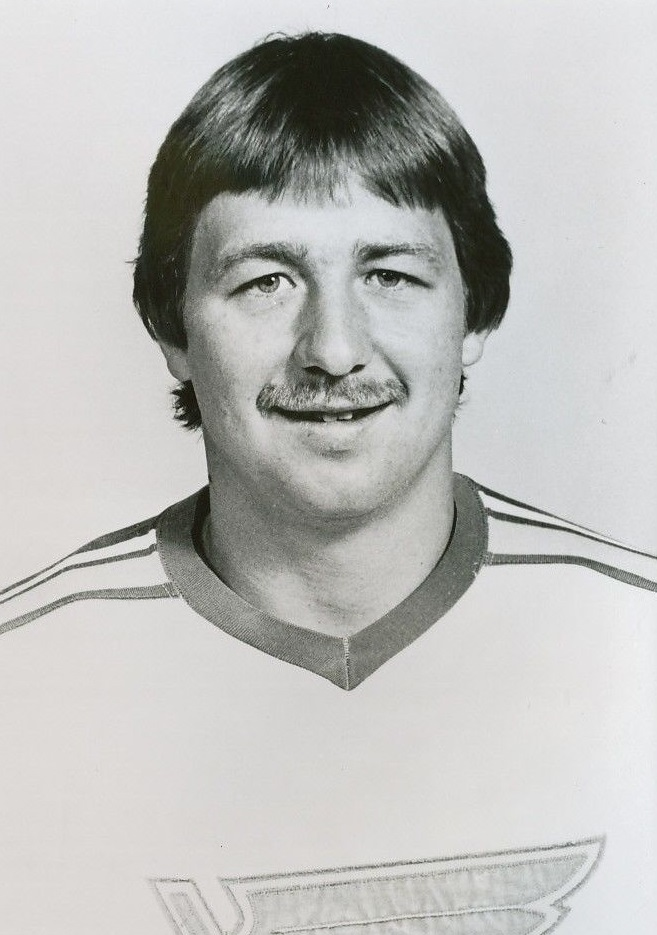
Federko with the St. Louis Blues c. 1981

When Federko returned to the Blues for the 1978–79 season, he experienced a breakout season and set a franchise record for points. He was placed on a line with Sutter and rookie Wayne Babych late in the preseason, and they were swiftly referred to the "Kid Line." By the end of October, Federko ranked second in league scoring with four goals and 13 assists. While the trio earned the "Kid" moniker as they were all under the age of 23, none of them preferred that nickname. Despite their rapid scoring pace to start the season, the Blues ranked third in the four-team Smythe Division. By mid-November, the "Kid Line" had scored 29 of the Blues' 60 goals, and Federko tied Babych for the league lead in scoring. The trio started December with a combined 40 goals and 51 assists through the Blues' first 26 games. Blues head coach Barclay Plager heavily praised Federko for his role as centreman of the line, saying: "They play like they've been playing in the league 10 year...Bernie makes it happen." Federko tied a single-game franchise record on December 19 after recording four assists in their 7–4 win over the Calgary Flames. This also helped the Blues snap a seven-game winless streak. On January 30, Federko reached the 20 goal milestone for the first time in his career and set a franchise record by tallying his 50th assist of the season in a win over the Los Angeles Kings. He continued his rapid scoring pace through February and broke two franchise records. In the final game of the month, Federko scored his franchise-record 86th point of the season, and the "Kid Line" broke the franchise record for points accumulated by a line. However, he was unable to complete the full season after suffering a wrist injury in one of the team's final games. Despite this, he finished with 31 goals and a franchise-record 64 assists for 95 points. Federko and Sutter subsequently signed extensions to remain with the Blues organisation.

While Federko, Sutter, and Babych were reunited to start the 1979–80 season, they were split up by November to bring greater scoring depth through the Blues' forward lines. Once Blair Chapman was acquired from the Pittsburgh Penguins, he was placed on the wing of Federko and Sutter's line. However, when Chapman suffered an eye injury, head coach Red Berenson briefly replaced him with Babych on the wing. Federko recorded his fourth career NHL hat-trick on February 3 to lead the Blues to their fifth win in six games. He was also chosen for the 1980 NHL All-Star Game. On April 6, 1980, Federko scored his 100th career NHL goal in the Blues' final regular-season game which helped them qualify for the 1980 Stanley Cup playoffs.

Federko and Sutter were reunited with Chapman to start the 1980–81 season before the latter suffered an injury. Berenson then replaced him with Babych, and the trio swiftly combined for 13 points through their first five games together before Babych suffered an injury on November 18. Chapman returned to his original position on Federko's wing before suffering a groin injury at the end of November. He was then replaced with Tony Currie. Despite his lack of consistent linemates, Federko set a franchise record for most consecutive games with an assist. He was unable to secure a league record because he sat out one game with a back injury. His assist streak ended at 10 games and his point streak ended at 15 games. By early December, Federko had accumulated 36 points over 22 games and he finished the month fourth all-time in Blues scoring. Federko was subsequently named to his second consecutive NHL All-Star Game. Federko continued to play alongside Currie and Sutter as the Blues experienced an 11-game point streak, although Currie was eventually replaced with Chapman. On March 7, Federko broke the Blues' single-season assist record in a win over the New York Rangers. He then scored five points on March 28, 1981, against the Buffalo Sabres to become the first 100-point scorer in St. Louis Blues history. Federko finished the regular season with a franchise and career-high 104 points through 78 games which helped the Blues qualify for the 1981 Stanley Cup playoffs. This also moved him into third place on the Blues all-time scoring list with 357 career points. He continued to set numerous franchise records during the Blues' playoff berth, including the record for most goals and points. While the New York Rangers eventually eliminated the Blues, he led the team with eight goals and 10 assists.

While Federko experienced a lengthy scoring slump following an injury in the 1981–82 season, he finished with a team-leading 92 points. Due to various injuries in the Blues' lineup, Federko's line with Sutter and Chapman were leaned on to produce offensively for the team. He scored a team-leading eight goals in the Blues’ first 10 games, but the team endured a five-game losing streak during that span. On December 19, Federko tied his own team record by tallying an assist in 10 consecutive games. However, later that month, he tore his rib cartilage and missed six games to recover. Upon returning to the Blues' lineup, he struggled to score and went goalless through 12 games. After only scoring once through a 17-game period, Federko scored his fifth career NHL hat-trick on February 27 against the Detroit Red Wings. He scored his 30th goal of the regular-season in the Blues' final game to help them finish third in the standings and qualify for the 1982 Stanley Cup playoffs. He finished the regular season with a team-leading 92 points, which also helped him surpass Garry Unger for the most assists in franchise history.

Federko and the Blues faced off against the Winnipeg Jets in the Clarence Campbell Conference Semifinals. Federko's line with Joe Mullen and Sutter remained together throughout the series. The trio combined for four goals in Game 3 to give the Blues the series lead. In Game 4, the line combined for four goals and 14 points to lift the Blues to an 8–2 win and advance them to the Division Finals. Federko also set a franchise playoff record with five points in one game and 10 assists through the entire series.

On January 27, 1983, Federko became the second player in franchise history to record 500th career points with the Blues.

==== Setting records and reaching milestones (1983–1988) ====
On December 13, 1983, Federko surpassed Unger to become the Blues' all-time leading scorer. He scored his 204th goal and 373rd assist to reach a franchise-best 577 career points with the Blues.

Federko recorded his 500th and 501st career assists on November 26, 1985, against the Toronto Maple Leafs. He signed a three-year contract extension with the Blues on April 25, 1986.

On March 19, 1988, in a game against the Hartford Whalers, Federko became the 22nd player in NHL history to record 1000 career points. He was subsequently honoured with the NHL Milestone Award. In September 1988, he signed a multi-year contract extension with the Blues. At the time of the signing, Federko held every major scoring record in the Blues franchise history.

=== Detroit Red Wings and retirement (1989–1990) ===
After he had a poor season as a captain in 1988–89, he was traded to the Detroit Red Wings with Tony McKegney for Adam Oates and Paul MacLean. In Detroit, Federko re-united with former Blues head coach Jacques Demers, but he had to play behind Steve Yzerman and did not get his desired ice time. After his lowest point output since his rookie season, Federko decided to retire after the 1989–90 season, having played exactly 1,000 NHL games with his final game on April 1, 1990.

== Post-NHL career ==
Less than a year after retiring as a player, the Blues retired number 24 in his honour on March 16, 1991. Federko was eventually inducted into the Hockey Hall of Fame in 2002, the first Hall of Famer to earn his credentials primarily as a Blue.

Following his retirement, Federko became a television colour commentator and studio analyst for Bally Sports Midwest during Blues broadcasts. He was the head coach/general manager of the St. Louis Vipers roller hockey team of the Roller Hockey International for the 1993 and 1994 seasons.

== Career statistics ==
=== Regular season and playoffs ===
			Regular season					Playoffs
Season	Team	League	GP	G	A	Pts	PIM	GP	G	A	Pts	PIM
1973–74	Saskatoon Blades	WCHL	68	22	28	50	19	6	0	0	0	2
1974–75	Saskatoon Blades	WCHL	66	39	68	107	30	17	15	7	22	8
1975–76	Saskatoon Blades	WCHL	72	72	115	187	106	20	18	27	45	8
1976–77	Kansas City Blues	CHL	42	30	39	69	41	—	—	—	—	—
1976–77	St. Louis Blues	NHL	31	14	9	23	15	4	1	1	2	2
1977–78	St. Louis Blues	NHL	72	17	24	41	27	—	—	—	—	—
1978–79	St. Louis Blues	NHL	74	31	64	95	14	—	—	—	—	—
1979–80	St. Louis Blues	NHL	79	38	56	94	24	3	1	0	1	2
1980–81	St. Louis Blues	NHL	78	31	73	104	47	11	8	10	18	2
1981–82	St. Louis Blues	NHL	74	30	62	92	70	10	3	15	18	10
1982–83	St. Louis Blues	NHL	75	24	60	84	24	4	2	3	5	0
1983–84	St. Louis Blues	NHL	79	41	66	107	43	11	4	4	8	10
1984–85	St. Louis Blues	NHL	76	30	73	103	27	3	0	2	2	4
1985–86	St. Louis Blues	NHL	80	34	68	102	34	19	7	14	21	17
1986–87	St. Louis Blues	NHL	64	20	52	72	32	6	3	3	6	18
1987–88	St. Louis Blues	NHL	79	20	69	89	52	10	2	6	8	18
1988–89	St. Louis Blues	NHL	66	22	45	67	54	10	4	8	12	0
1989–90	Detroit Red Wings	NHL	73	17	40	57	24	—	—	—	—	—
NHL totals			1,000	369	761	1,130	487	91	35	66	101	83

== Awards ==
- Bob Brownridge Memorial Trophy (WCHL leading scorer) - 1976
- Named to the WCHL First All-Star Team (1976)
- Named WCHL MVP (1976)
- Named to the CHL Second All-Star Team (1977)
- Won Ken McKenzie Trophy as CHL Rookie of the Year (1977)
- Played in the NHL All-Star Game (1980, 1981)
- Named NHL Player of the Week (For week ending December 3, 1984)

== Records ==
- St. Louis Blues team record for career games played (927)
- St. Louis Blues team record for career assists (721)
- St. Louis Blues team record for career points (1073)
- Shares St. Louis Blues team record for assists in one game (5 on February 27, 1988)
- St. Louis Blues team record for career playoff assists (66)
- First NHL player to get 50 assists in 10 consecutive seasons.

== See also ==
- Hockey Hall of Fame
- List of NHL players with 1,000 points
- List of NHL players with 1,000 games played
- List of NHL players with 100-point seasons
- List of NHL statistical leaders

Awards and achievements
Preceded by John Davidson	St. Louis Blues first-round draft pick 1976	Succeeded by Scott Campbell
Preceded by Blair Chapman	Edmonton Oilers first-round draft pick 1976	Succeeded by Mike Crombeen
Preceded by Brian Sutter	St. Louis Blues captain 1988–89	Succeeded by Rick Meagher
