= Sandbeck =

Sandbeck is a surname. Notable people with the surname include:

- Vidar Sandbeck (1918–2005), Norwegian folk singer, composer, and writer
- Cal Sandbeck (born 1956), American professional ice hockey player

== See also ==
- Sandbeck Park, 17th-century country house in South Yorkshire, England
