= Steve Clippingdale =

Canadian ice hockey player (born 1956)

- Born: July 30, 1956 (age 69) Vancouver, British Columbia, Canada
- Height: 6 ft 2 in (188 cm)
- Weight: 195 lb (88 kg; 13 st 13 lb)
- Position: Left wing
- Shot: Left
- Played for: Los Angeles Kings; Washington Capitals
- NHL draft: 21st overall, 1976; Los Angeles Kings
- WHA draft: 33rd overall, 1976; Winnipeg Jets
- Playing career: 1976–1980

Steven J. Clippingdale (born April 29, 1956) is a Canadian former professional ice hockey left winger.

He was drafted in 1976 by both the Los Angeles Kings of the National Hockey League and the Winnipeg Jets of the World Hockey Association, Clippingdale played for the Kings and Washington Capitals.

== Career statistics ==
			Regular season					Playoffs
Season	Team	League	GP	G	A	Pts	PIM	GP	G	A	Pts	PIM
1973–74	University of Wisconsin	NCAA	4	1	3	4	0	—	—	—	—	—
1974–75	New Westminster Bruins	WCHL	62	26	19	45	27	17	4	1	5	11
1975–76	New Westminster Bruins	WCHL	72	51	66	117	80	17	15	14	29	12
1976–77	Los Angeles Kings	NHL	16	1	2	3	9	1	0	0	0	0
1976–77	Fort Worth Texans	CHL	54	24	17	41	49	—	—	—	—	—
1977–78	Springfield Indians	AHL	74	33	21	54	59	4	1	2	3	5
1978–79	Dallas Black Hawks	CHL	64	27	38	65	99	1	0	0	0	0
1979–80	Washington Capitals	NHL	3	0	0	0	0	—	—	—	—	—
1979–80	Hershey Bears	AHL	47	19	14	33	47	5	2	0	2	4
NHL totals			19	1	2	3	9	1	0	0	0	0
AHL totals			121	52	35	87	106	9	3	2	5	9
CHL totals			118	51	55	106	148	1	0	0	0	0

== Awards ==
- WCHL Second All-Star Team – 1976
