= Lorry Gloeckner =

Canadian ice hockey player

- Born: January 25, 1956 (age 69); Kindersley, Saskatchewan, Canada
- Height: 6 ft 2 in (188 cm)
- Weight: 210 lb (95 kg; 15 st 0 lb)
- Position: Defence
- Shot: Left
- Played for: Detroit Red Wings
- NHL draft: 34th overall, 1976; Boston Bruins
- WHA draft: 67th overall, 1976; Calgary Cowboys
- Playing career: 1978–1980

Lorry Gloeckner (born January 25, 1956) is a Canadian former ice hockey player who played 13 games in the National Hockey League for the Detroit Red Wings during the 1978–79 season.

== Career statistics ==
=== Regular season and playoffs ===
| | | | Regular season | | | | | Playoffs |
| Season | Team | League | GP | G | A | Pts | PIM | GP | G | A | Pts | PIM |
|---|---|---|---|---|---|---|---|---|---|---|---|---|
| 1972–73 | Victoria Cougars | WCHL | 4 | 0 | 0 | 0 | 4 | — | — | — | — | — |
| 1973–74 | Nanaimo Clippers | BCJHL | 35 | 3 | 15 | 18 | 45 | — | — | — | — | — |
| 1973–74 | Victoria Cougars | WCHL | 33 | 1 | 7 | 8 | 45 | — | — | — | — | — |
| 1974–75 | Victoria Cougars | WCHL | 65 | 2 | 12 | 14 | 79 | 12 | 0 | 4 | 4 | 20 |
| 1975–76 | Victoria Cougars | WCHL | 71 | 7 | 48 | 55 | 123 | 15 | 0 | 8 | 8 | 38 |
| 1976–77 | Victoria Cougars | WCHL | 58 | 5 | 22 | 27 | 52 | 4 | 0 | 2 | 2 | 0 |
| 1978–79 | Kansas City Red Wings | CHL | 51 | 0 | 17 | 17 | 44 | 4 | 0 | 1 | 1 | 9 |
| 1978–79 | Detroit Red Wings | NHL | 13 | 0 | 2 | 2 | 6 | — | — | — | — | — |
| 1979–80 | Johnstown Red Wings | EHL | 63 | 6 | 29 | 35 | 83 | — | — | — | — | — |
| NHL totals | | | 13 | 0 | 2 | 2 | 6 | — | — | — | — | — |
