= Alex McKendry =

Canadian ice hockey player (born 1956)

- Born: November 21, 1956 (age 69) Midland, Ontario, Canada
- Height: 6 ft 4 in (193 cm)
- Weight: 200 lb (91 kg; 14 st 4 lb)
- Position: Winger
- Shot: Left
- Played for: New York Islanders; Calgary Flames
- NHL draft: 14th overall, 1976; New York Islanders
- WHA draft: 15th overall, 1976; Indianapolis Racers
- Playing career: 1976–1983

Alex McKendry (born November 21, 1956) is a Canadian former professional ice hockey player. He played 46 games in the National Hockey League (NHL) for the New York Islanders and Calgary Flames from 1978 to 1981. The rest of his career, which lasted from 1976 to 1983, was primarily spent in the Central Hockey League. He was a first round selection of the Islanders, taken 14th overall in the 1976 NHL Amateur Draft. He appeared in six playoff games in the Islanders' Stanley Cup championship season of 1979–80. McKendry's most significant time in the NHL came in 1980–81 when he appeared in 36 games for the Flames.

== Playing career ==
McKendry, a native of Midland, Ontario, played three seasons of junior hockey for the Sudbury Wolves of the Ontario Major Junior Hockey League (OMJHL). His best with the Wolves was in 1975–76 when he had 43 goals and 102 points in the regular season and added 12 points in 16 playoff games. The Wolves reached the OMJHL championship series, where they were defeated by the Hamilton Fincups. McKendry was voted to the league's third all-star team.

The New York Islanders selected McKendry with their first round selection, 14th overall, at the 1976 NHL Amateur Draft. Additionally, he was selected by the Indianapolis Racers of the World Hockey Association (WHA), 15th overall, in its 1976 Amateur Draft. He chose the NHL over the WHA, and though he impressed team officials in his first training camp, the Islanders assigned McKendry to their Central Hockey League (CHL) affiliate, the Fort Worth Texans. He appeared in 65 games in Fort Worth, scoring 7 goals and 14 assists. He made his NHL debut in 1977–78, appearing in four games with the Islanders, but spent the majority of the season in Fort Worth where the Texans won the Adams Cup as league champions.

McKendry again spent most of the 1979–80 season in the CHL, as a member of the Indianapolis Checkers, where he was named a league all-star after scoring 40 goals and 77 points. He was recalled by the Islanders during the 1980 Stanley Cup Playoffs following an injury to team star Mike Bossy. He scored the first two goals of his NHL career on April 12, 1980, against the Los Angeles Kings as part of a 6–0 victory that allowed the Islanders to win their preliminary round series. He appeared in six playoff games, adding two assists to his two goals, as the Islanders won their first Stanley Cup championship.

The Calgary Flames acquired McKendry prior to the 1980–81 season, trading a third round selection in the 1981 NHL entry draft on October 9, 1980. He enjoyed his most significant time in the NHL that season, appearing in 36 games with Calgary, scoring 3 goals and 6 assists. He was playing with the Flames' CHL affiliate, the Birmingham Bulls, when the team folded mid-season in February 1981 due to financial difficulty. He was assigned to the Fort Worth Texans for the remainder of the season.

McKendry never returned to the NHL. He played two additional seasons in the Flames system – 1981–82 with the Oklahoma City Stars and 1982–83 with the Colorado Flames – after which he retired as a player.

== Career statistics ==
=== Regular season and playoffs ===
| | | | Regular season | | | | | Playoffs |
| Season | Team | League | GP | G | A | Pts | PIM | GP | G | A | Pts | PIM |
|---|---|---|---|---|---|---|---|---|---|---|---|---|
| 1973–74 | Sudbury Wolves | OHA | 61 | 4 | 8 | 12 | 173 | 4 | 0 | 1 | 1 | 0 |
| 1974–75 | Sudbury Wolves | OMJHL | 57 | 19 | 34 | 53 | 181 | 15 | 5 | 8 | 13 | 29 |
| 1975–76 | Sudbury Wolves | OMJHL | 65 | 43 | 59 | 102 | 121 | 16 | 4 | 8 | 12 | 15 |
| 1976–77 | Fort Worth Texans | CHL | 65 | 7 | 14 | 21 | 80 | 6 | 0 | 2 | 2 | 4 |
| 1976–77 | Muskegon Mohawks | IHL | 11 | 4 | 6 | 10 | 31 | — | — | — | — | — |
| 1977–78 | New York Islanders | NHL | 4 | 0 | 0 | 0 | 2 | — | — | — | — | — |
| 1977–78 | Fort Worth Texans | CHL | 72 | 22 | 22 | 44 | 148 | 10 | 1 | 3 | 4 | 30 |
| 1978–79 | New York Islanders | NHL | 4 | 0 | 0 | 0 | 0 | — | — | — | — | — |
| 1978–79 | Fort Worth Texans | CHL | 59 | 12 | 26 | 38 | 202 | 5 | 0 | 2 | 2 | 4 |
| 1979–80 | New York Islanders | NHL | 2 | 0 | 0 | 0 | 0 | 6 | 2 | 2 | 4 | 0 |
| 1979–80 | Indianapolis Checkers | CHL | 76 | 40 | 37 | 77 | 64 | 4 | 2 | 4 | 6 | 7 |
| 1980–81 | Calgary Flames | NHL | 36 | 3 | 6 | 9 | 19 | — | — | — | — | — |
| 1980–81 | Birmingham Bulls | CHL | 10 | 1 | 5 | 6 | 23 | — | — | — | — | — |
| 1980–81 | Fort Worth Texans | CHL | 19 | 3 | 3 | 6 | 25 | 5 | 0 | 0 | 0 | 13 |
| 1981–82 | Oklahoma City Stars | CHL | 80 | 27 | 59 | 86 | 163 | 4 | 1 | 1 | 2 | 9 |
| 1982–83 | Colorado Flames | CHL | 72 | 25 | 42 | 67 | 44 | 5 | 0 | 2 | 2 | 4 |
| CHL totals | | | 453 | 137 | 206 | 343 | 749 | 39 | 4 | 14 | 18 | 71 |
| NHL totals | | | 43 | 3 | 6 | 9 | 21 | 6 | 2 | 2 | 4 | 0 |

| Preceded by Pat Price | New York Islanders first-round draft pick 1976 | Succeeded by Mike Bossy |
