= Björn Johansson (ice hockey) =

Swedish ice hockey player (born 1956)

- Born: January 15, 1956 (age 70) Örebro, Sweden
- Height: 6 ft 0 in (183 cm)
- Weight: 195 lb (88 kg; 13 st 13 lb)
- Position: Defence
- Shot: Left
- Played for: Cleveland Barons
- NHL draft: 5th overall, 1976; California Golden Seals
- WHA draft: 8th overall, 1976; Toronto Toros
- Playing career: 1973–1989

Björn Erik Johansson (born January 15, 1956) is a Swedish former professional ice hockey defenceman. He was drafted in the first round of both the 1976 NHL Amateur Draft and the 1976 WHA Amateur Draft, by the California Golden Seals and Toronto Toros, respectively. He played 15 games in the National Hockey League (NHL) with the Cleveland Barons, scoring one goal and one assist.

== Career statistics ==
=== Regular season and playoffs ===
			Regular season					Playoffs
Season	Team	League	GP	G	A	Pts	PIM	GP	G	A	Pts	PIM
1971–72	Örebro IK	SWE-2	9	2	2	4	—	—	—	—	—	—
1972–73	Örebro IK	SWE-2	8	2	2	4	4	—	—	—	—	—
1973–74	Örebro IK	SWE	18	2	2	4	27	—	—	—	—	—
1974–75	Örebro IK	SWE	30	13	1	14	22	—	—	—	—	—
1975–76	Örebro IK	SWE-2	21	9	15	24	—	—	—	—	—	—
1976–77	Cleveland Barons	NHL	10	1	1	2	4	—	—	—	—	—
1976–77	Salt Lake Golden Eagles	CHL	56	8	16	24	10	—	—	—	—	—
1977–78	Cleveland Barons	NHL	5	0	0	0	6	—	—	—	—	—
1977–78	Phoenix Roadrunners	CHL	13	0	3	3	15	—	—	—	—	—
1977–78	Binghamton Dusters	AHL	24	0	10	10	6	—	—	—	—	—
1977–78	Rochester Americans	AHL	25	2	10	12	20	—	—	—	—	—
1978–79	Örebro IK	SEL	36	7	15	22	37	—	—	—	—	—
1979–80	Västra Frölunda IF	SEL	33	8	10	18	46	8	2	1	3	8
1980–81	Örebro IK	SWE-2	30	10	16	26	45	—	—	—	—	—
1981–82	Örebro IK	SWE-2	36	18	18	36	63	—	—	—	—	—
1982–83	Örebro IK	SWE-2	31	9	18	27	50	—	—	—	—	—
1983–84	Örebro IK	SWE-2	29	18	18	36	24	—	—	—	—	—
1984–85	Örebro IK	SWE-2	32	7	13	20	40	—	—	—	—	—
1985–86	Örebro IK	SWE-2	31	9	14	23	24	4	1	3	4	6
1986–87	Örebro IK	SWE-2	30	6	19	25	24	6	3	2	5	10
1987–88	Örebro IK	SWE-2	34	4	24	28	32	7	0	5	5	12
1988–89	Örebro IK	SWE-2	29	5	22	27	38	12	1	3	4	12
SWE/SEL totals			117	30	28	58	132	8	2	1	3	8
NHL totals			15	1	1	2	10	—	—	—	—	—

=== International ===
Year	Team	Event	GP	G	A	Pts	PIM
1974	Sweden	WJC	5	0	1	1	2
1974	Sweden	EJC	5	0	1	1	6
1975	Sweden	WJC		1	2	3
1975	Sweden	EJC	5	3	2	5	2
1976	Sweden	WJC	4	3	2	5	0
Junior totals			19	6	6	12	10

- Totals do not include numbers from the 1975 World Junior Ice Hockey Championships.

Preceded by Ralph Klassen	California Golden Seals first-round draft pick 1976	Succeeded by Mike Crombeen
