= Rob Tudor =

Canadian ice hockey player (born 1956)

- Born: June 30, 1956 (age 69) Cupar, Saskatchewan, Canada
- Height: 5 ft 11 in (180 cm)
- Weight: 188 lb (85 kg; 13 st 6 lb)
- Position: Centre
- Shot: Right
- Played for: Vancouver Canucks; St. Louis Blues
- NHL draft: 98th Overall, 1976; Vancouver Canucks
- WHA draft: 77th overall, 1976; San Diego Mariners
- Playing career: 1976–1986

Robert Alan Tudor (born June 30, 1956 in Cupar, Saskatchewan and raised in Dysart, Saskatchewan) is a retired professional ice hockey centre who spent parts of three seasons in the National Hockey League, playing 28 games for the Vancouver Canucks and St. Louis Blues. The bulk of his career was spent in the minor Central Hockey League. Tudor played major junior hockey for the Regina Pats of the Western Canada Hockey League before being selected by the Canucks in the 1976 NHL Amateur Draft. He made his professional debut that year and first played in the NHL in 1978.

== Playing career ==
A scrappy but somewhat undersized center, Tudor was selected 98th overall in the 1976 NHL Amateur Draft by the Vancouver Canucks following a 106-point season for the Regina Pats of the Western Hockey League. He would spend six seasons in the Canucks' system, consistently finishing as one of the highest scorers on their minor-league affiliates, but was unable to make the jump to the NHL full-time. His longest taste of NHL action came in the 1978–79 season, as he registered 4 goals and 8 points in a 24-game stint in Vancouver. He spent both the 1979 and 1980 playoffs on the Canucks' roster, appearing in 3 postseason games without scoring a point.

Released by the Canucks in 1982, Tudor signed on with the St. Louis Blues. He scored 37 goals in minor-pro and earned another brief NHL callup, playing 2 games for the Blues in 1982–83. He would have a brief stint in Germany the following season, and a few more minor-league stops back in North America before retiring in 1986.

Altogether, Tudor appeared in 28 NHL games, recording 4 goals and 4 assists for 8 points, and added 19 penalty minutes. Tudor and his friend and junior teammate Drew Callander would have almost parallel careers - teammates for 3 seasons in Regina, they would play together for four seasons in the Canucks' system for the Dallas Black Hawks, and later also teamed up in Germany. Tudor finished his career with 8 points in 28 NHL games, and Callander with 8 points in 39 NHL games.

== Post-playing career ==
Rob coached minor hockey in Okotoks, Alberta, where his son Connor played junior Hockey.

== Career statistics ==
=== Regular season and playoffs ===
			Regular season					Playoffs
Season	Team	League	GP	G	A	Pts	PIM	GP	G	A	Pts	PIM
1971–72	Dysart Blues	SIHA	—	—	—	—	—	—	—	—	—	—
1972–73	Regina Pats	WCHL	5	0	1	1	0	—	—	—	—	—
1973–74	Regina Pats	WCHL	68	17	17	34	60	16	4	2	6	17
1974–75	Regina Pats	WCHL	68	48	48	96	125	11	5	6	11	20
1975–76	Regina Pats	WCHL	72	46	60	106	228	6	6	3	9	15
1976–77	Fort Wayne Komets	IHL	78	34	60	94	108	9	11	8	19	26
1977–78	Tulsa Oilers	CHL	65	23	33	56	58	7	1	2	3	37
1978–79	Dallas Black Hawks	CHL	51	27	37	64	80	—	—	—	—	—
1978–79	Vancouver Canucks	NHL	24	4	4	8	19	2	0	0	0	0
1979–80	Dallas Black Hawks	CHL	74	39	41	80	177	—	—	—	—	—
1979–80	Vancouver Canucks	NHL	2	0	0	0	0	1	0	0	0	0
1980–81	Dallas Black Hawks	CHL	79	31	32	63	155	6	0	1	1	25
1981–82	Dallas Black Hawks	CHL	80	32	47	79	132	15	7	13	20	56
1982–83	Salt Lake Golden Eagles	CHL	76	37	30	67	168	6	1	4	5	2
1982–83	St. Louis Blues	NHL	2	0	0	0	0	—	—	—	—	—
1983–84	Kölner EC	GER	28	9	8	17	82	—	—	—	—	—
1983–84	Salt Lake Golden Eagles	CHL	32	10	12	22	35	5	1	2	3	21
1984–85	Nova Scotia Oilers	AHL	22	6	6	12	40	—	—	—	—	—
1984–85	New Haven Nighthawks	AHL	52	9	11	20	45	—	—	—	—	—
1985–86	Fort Wayne Komets	IHL	13	6	8	14	7	15	4	2	6	35
CHL totals			457	199	232	431	805	39	10	22	32	141
NHL totals			28	4	4	8	19	3	0	0	0	0
