= Clayton Pachal =

Canadian ice hockey player (1956–2021)

- Born: April 21, 1956 Yorkton, Saskatchewan, Canada
- Died: February 7, 2021 (aged 64) Saskatoon, Saskatchewan, Canada
- Height: 5 ft 11 in (180 cm)
- Weight: 185 lb (84 kg; 13 st 3 lb)
- Position: Centre
- Shot: Left
- Played for: Boston Bruins; Colorado Rockies
- NHL draft: 16th overall, 1976; Boston Bruins
- WHA draft: 17th overall, 1976; Winnipeg Jets
- Playing career: 1976–1980

Clayton Edward Pachal (April 21, 1956 – February 7, 2021) was a Canadian professional ice hockey centre. He played 36 games in the National Hockey League between 1977 and 1978 with the Boston Bruins and Colorado Rockies.

== Biography ==
Born in Yorkton, Saskatchewan, Pachal was drafted in the first round, 16th overall, by the Boston Bruins in the 1976 NHL Amateur Draft. He was also drafted in the second round, 17th overall, by the Winnipeg Jets in the 1976 World Hockey Association draft; however, he never played in that league. He played 35 games in the National Hockey League (NHL): 11 with the Bruins and 24 with the Colorado Rockies. He died in 2021 at the age of 64.

His second cousin, Brayden Pachal, currently plays in the NHL for the Calgary Flames.

== Career statistics ==
=== Regular season and playoffs ===
			Regular season					Playoffs
Season	Team	League	GP	G	A	Pts	PIM	GP	G	A	Pts	PIM
1972–73	Yorkton Terriers	SJHL	—	—	—	—	—	—	—	—	—	—
1972–73	New Westminster Bruins	WCHL	37	2	2	4	67	5	0	0	0	16
1973–74	New Westminster Bruins	WCHL	67	8	11	19	278	11	1	1	2	39
1974–75	New Westminster Bruins	WCHL	65	17	30	47	306	17	3	6	9	72
1974–75	New Westminster Bruins	M-Cup	—	—	—	—	—	4	2	1	3	4
1975–76	New Westminster Bruins	WCHL	65	41	47	88	259	15	9	8	17	29
1975–76	New Westminster Bruins	M-Cup	—	—	—	—	—	4	2	0	2	14
1976–77	Boston Bruins	NHL	1	0	0	0	12	—	—	—	—	—
1976–77	Rochester Americans	AHL	70	8	20	28	150	9	4	2	6	2
1976–77	Broome Dusters	NAHL	1	0	0	0	0	—	—	—	—	—
1977–78	Boston Bruins	NHL	10	0	0	0	14	—	—	—	—	—
1977–78	Rochester Americans	AHL	61	10	10	20	105	6	1	2	3	7
1978–79	Colorado Rockies	NHL	24	2	3	5	69	—	—	—	—	—
1978–79	Philadelphia Firebirds	AHL	26	1	4	5	75	—	—	—	—	—
1979–80	Cincinnati Stingers	CHL	18	0	2	2	31	—	—	—	—	—
1979–80	Grand Rapids Owls	IHL	34	8	17	25	64	—	—	—	—	—
NHL totals			35	2	3	5	95	—	—	—	—	—

=== International ===
Year	Team	Event	GP	G	A	Pts	PIM
1975	Canada	WJC	3	0	0	0	2
Junior totals			3	0	0	0	2

Preceded by Doug Halward	Boston Bruins first-round draft pick 1976	Succeeded by Dwight Foster
