= Fern LeBlanc =

Canadian ice hockey player (born 1956)

- Born: January 12, 1956 (age 69); Baie-Comeau, Quebec, Canada
- Height: 5 ft 9 in (175 cm)
- Weight: 170 lb (77 kg; 12 st 2 lb)
- Position: Left wing
- Shot: Left
- Played for: Detroit Red Wings; EHC Chur; HC Ajoie
- NHL draft: 111th overall, 1976; Detroit Red Wings
- WHA draft: 96th overall, 1976; Cincinnati Stingers
- Playing career: 1976–1989

Fernand LeBlanc (born January 12, 1956) is a Canadian former professional ice hockey player who played 34 games in the National Hockey League with the Detroit Red Wings between 1976 and 1978. The rest of his career, which lasted from 1976 to 1989, was mainly spent in the Swiss National League B. As a youth, he played in the 1967 Quebec International Pee-Wee Hockey Tournament with a minor ice hockey team from Baie-Comeau.

== Career statistics ==
=== Regular season and playoffs ===
			Regular season					Playoffs
Season	Team	League	GP	G	A	Pts	PIM	GP	G	A	Pts	PIM
1971–72	Sherbrooke Castors	QMJHL	17	0	1	1	0	1	0	0	0	5
1973–74	Sherbrooke Castors	QMJHL	70	37	30	67	46	5	1	2	3	0
1974–75	Sherbrooke Castors	QMJHL	22	17	12	29	8	13	6	10	16	4
1975–76	Sherbrooke Castors	QMJHL	71	63	71	134	29	17	9	15	24	11
1976–77	Detroit Red Wings	NHL	3	0	0	0	0	—	—	—	—	—
1976–77	Kalamazoo Wings	IHL	77	39	32	71	57	10	9	8	17	4
1977–78	Detroit Red Wings	NHL	2	0	0	0	0	—	—	—	—	—
1977–78	Kansas City Red Wings	CHL	69	29	21	50	39	—	—	—	—	—
1978–79	Detroit Red Wings	NHL	29	5	6	11	0	—	—	—	—	—
1978–79	Kansas City Red Wings	CHL	35	15	26	41	14	—	—	—	—	—
1980–81	EHC Chur	NLB	—	—	—	—	—	—	—	—	—	—
1981–82	EHC Chur	NLB	—	29	—	—	—	—	—	—	—	—
1982–83	EHC Chur	NLB	38	60	36	96	—	—	—	—	—	—
1983–84	EHC Chur	NLB	38	61	29	90	—	—	—	—	—	—
1984–85	EHC Chur	NLA	36	29	17	46	—	—	—	—	—	—
1985–86	SC Herisau	SUI-3	22	39	35	74	—	—	—	—	—	—
1986–87	SC Herisau	NLB	36	54	46	102	38	3	1	1	2	4
1987–88	HC Ajoie	NLB	36	46	43	89	67	6	3	4	7	6
1988–89	HC Ajoie	NLA	7	3	3	6	6	—	—	—	—	—
NHL totals			34	5	6	11	0	—	—	—	—	—

=== International ===
Year	Team	Event	GP	G	A	Pts	PIM
1976	Canada	WJC	4	1	1	2	4
Junior totals			4	1	1	2	4
