= Mike Hordy =

Canadian ice hockey player

- Born: October 10, 1956 (age 68); Thunder Bay, Ontario, Canada
- Height: 5 ft 10 in (178 cm)
- Weight: 180 lb (82 kg; 12 st 12 lb)
- Position: Defence
- Shot: Left
- Played for: New York Islanders
- NHL draft: 86th overall, 1976; New York Islanders
- WHA draft: 82nd overall, 1976; Houston Aeros
- Playing career: 1976–1985

Michael Hordy (born October 10, 1956 in Thunder Bay, Ontario) is a Canadian retired professional ice hockey player who played eleven games in the National Hockey League for the New York Islanders.

== Career statistics ==
			Regular season					Playoffs
Season	Team	League	GP	G	A	Pts	PIM	GP	G	A	Pts	PIM
1973–74	Thunder Bay Hurricanes	MWJHL	59	11	39	50	34	—	—	—	—	—
1974–75	Sault Ste. Marie Greyhounds	OMJHL	70	18	33	51	59	—	—	—	—	—
1975–76	Sault Ste. Marie Greyhounds	OMJHL	63	17	51	68	84	12	2	8	10	8
1976–77	Fort Worth Texans	CHL	2	0	0	0	5	3	0	0	0	0
1976–77	Muskegon Mohawks	IHL	77	16	45	61	38	7	2	4	6	2
1977–78	Fort Worth Texans	CHL	76	14	35	49	87	14	2	9	11	15
1978–79	Fort Worth Texans	CHL	74	17	48	65	71	5	0	3	3	6
1978–79	New York Islanders	NHL	2	0	0	0	0	—	—	—	—	—
1979–80	Indianapolis Checkers	CHL	64	4	32	36	43	7	0	4	4	2
1979–80	New York Islanders	NHL	9	0	0	0	7	—	—	—	—	—
1980–81	Indianapolis Checkers	CHL	70	10	48	58	103	5	1	3	4	6
1981–82	Indianapolis Checkers	CHL	79	17	49	66	86	10	4	6	10	15
1982–83	Grasshopper Club Zürich	NLB	27	16	10	26	40	—	—	—	—	—
1983–84	Maine Mariners	AHL	72	11	40	51	31	17	2	6	8	4
1984–85	Maine Mariners	AHL	68	1	18	19	46	—	—	—	—	—
NHL totals			11	0	0	0	7	—	—	—	—	—
AHL totals			140	12	58	70	77	17	2	6	8	4
CHL totals			365	62	212	274	395	44	7	25	32	44
