= Joe Kowal =

Canadian ice hockey player (1956–2023)

- Born: February 3, 1956; Toronto, Ontario, Canada
- Died: July 25, 2023 (aged 67)
- Height: 6 ft 5 in (196 cm)
- Weight: 212 lb (96 kg; 15 st 2 lb)
- Position: Left wing
- Shot: Left
- Played for: Buffalo Sabres
- NHL draft: 33rd overall, 1976; Buffalo Sabres
- WHA draft: 64th overall, 1976; Indianapolis Racers
- Playing career: 1976–1981

Joseph Douglas Kowal (February 3, 1956 – July 25, 2023) was a Canadian professional ice hockey left wing who played 22 games in the National Hockey League with the Buffalo Sabres between 1976 and 1978. The rest of his career, which lasted from 1976 to 1981, was spent in the minor American Hockey League.

He was drafted in the second round, 33rd overall, by the Sabres in the 1976 NHL Amateur Draft, after his performance as part of the 1975-76 OMJHL J. Ross Robertson Cup and the 1976 Memorial Cup Champion Hamilton Fincups, after previously playing junior in both OPJAHL Whitby and in Oshawa.

Kowal died on July 25, 2023, at the age of 67.

== Career statistics ==
=== Regular season and playoffs ===
			Regular season					Playoffs
Season	Team	League	GP	G	A	Pts	PIM	GP	G	A	Pts	PIM
1973–74	Whitby Knob Hill Farms	OPJAHL	38	12	13	25	47	—	—	—	—	—
1974–75	Oshawa Generals	OMJHL	61	18	26	44	93	5	1	0	1	12
1975–76	Oshawa Generals	OMJHL	4	0	2	2	13	—	—	—	—	—
1975–76	Hamilton Fincups	OMJHL	52	32	45	77	100	10	5	4	9	39
1975–76	Hamilton Fincups	M-Cup	—	—	—	—	—	3	1	0	1	17
1976–77	Buffalo Sabres	NHL	16	0	5	5	6	—	—	—	—	—
1976–77	Hershey Bears	AHL	46	13	17	30	75	2	0	0	0	8
1977–78	Buffalo Sabres	NHL	6	0	0	0	7	2	0	0	0	0
1977–78	Hershey Bears	AHL	45	14	16	30	48	—	—	—	—	—
1978–79	Springfield Indians	AHL	12	3	3	6	10	—	—	—	—	—
1978–79	Binghamton Dusters	AHL	52	17	31	48	75	10	1	1	2	16
1979–80	Rochester Americans	AHL	66	20	27	47	139	3	0	0	0	4
1980–81	Nova Scotia Voyageurs	AHL	34	1	10	11	166	—	—	—	—	—
AHL totals			255	68	104	172	513	15	1	1	2	28
NHL totals			22	0	5	5	13	2	0	0	0	0
