= Dave Dornseif =

American ice hockey player (born 1956)

- Born: August 12, 1956 (age 69) Edina, Minnesota, U.S.
- Height: 6 ft 3 in (191 cm)
- Weight: 205 lb (93 kg; 14 st 9 lb)
- Position: Defense
- Shot: Left
- Played for: Indianapolis Racers; Cincinnati Stingers
- NHL draft: 124th overall, 1976; St. Louis Blues
- WHA draft: 40th overall, 1976; Indianapolis Racers
- Playing career: 1978–1980

Dave Dornseif (born August 12, 1956) is an American former professional ice hockey player who played in the World Hockey Association (WHA). He was drafted in the ninth round of the 1976 NHL Amateur Draft by the St. Louis Blues and the fourth round of the 1976 WHA Amateur Draft by the Indianapolis Racers. He played parts of two seasons with the Racers and Cincinnati Stingers.

== Career statistics ==
			Regular season					Playoffs
Season	Team	League	GP	G	A	Pts	PIM	GP	G	A	Pts	PIM
1974–75	Providence College	NCAA	26	6	26	32	29	—	—	—	—	—
1975–76	Providence College	NCAA	22	3	23	26	21	—	—	—	—	—
1976–77	Providence College	NCAA	28	3	23	26	14	—	—	—	—	—
1977–78	Providence College	NCAA	34	7	35	42	72	—	—	—	—	—
1977–78	Indianapolis Racers	WHA	3	0	1	1	0	—	—	—	—	—
1978–79	Erie Blades	NEHL	63	14	42	56	86	12	3	8	11	9
1978–79	Cincinnati Stingers	WHA	1	0	0	0	0	—	—	—	—	—
1979–80	Erie Blades	EHL-Pro	65	11	24	35	70	—	—	—	—	—
1980–81	SIJC Utrecht	Netherlands	—	—	—	—	—	—	—	—	—	—
WHA totals			4	0	1	1	0	—	—	—	—	—
