= Larry Skinner =

Canadian ice hockey player

- Born: January 21, 1956 (age 69) Vancouver, British Columbia, Canada
- Height: 5 ft 11 in (180 cm)
- Weight: 170 lb (77 kg; 12 st 2 lb)
- Position: Centre
- Shot: Left
- Played for: Colorado Rockies
- NHL draft: 92nd overall, 1976; Kansas City Scouts
- WHA draft: 58th overall, 1976; Houston Aeros
- Playing career: 1976–1988

Larry Foster Skinner (born April 21, 1956 in Vancouver, British Columbia) is a retired National Hockey League player. He played 47 games for the Colorado Rockies and spent most of his professional career in the American Hockey League with stints in the Central Hockey League and in Europe in the Austrian and French leagues. On August 11, 2010, he was named an assistant coach of the Ottawa 67s of the Ontario Hockey League after performing a similar role with the Nepean Raiders of the Central Junior Hockey League.

Skinner scored the first goal in Colorado Rockies history on October 5, 1976.

== Career statistics ==
=== Regular season and playoffs ===
			Regular season					Playoffs
Season	Team	League	GP	G	A	Pts	PIM	GP	G	A	Pts	PIM
1972–73	Nepean Raiders	CJHL	55	23	35	58	15	—	—	—	—	—
1973–74	Nepean Raiders	CJHL	55	22	34	56	15	—	—	—	—	—
1974–75	Winnipeg Clubs	WCHL	70	33	62	95	17	—	—	—	—	—
1975–76	Ottawa 67s	OMJHL	59	37	78	115	8	12	8	8	16	8
1976–77	Rhode Island Reds	AHL	46	22	34	56	11	—	—	—	—	—
1976–77	Colorado Rockies	NHL	19	4	5	9	6	—	—	—	—	—
1977–78	Phoenix Roadrunners	CHL	20	4	6	10	9	—	—	—	—	—
1977–78	Springfield Indians	AHL	14	1	5	6	2	—	—	—	—	—
1977–78	Hampton Gulls	AHL	15	7	9	16	6	—	—	—	—	—
1977–78	Colorado Rockies	NHL	14	3	5	8	0	2	0	0	0	0
1978–79	Philadelphia Firebirds	AHL	67	34	33	67	34	—	—	—	—	—
1978–79	Colorado Rockies	NHL	12	3	2	5	2	—	—	—	—	—
1979–80	New Haven Nighthawks	AHL	63	18	53	71	38	10	5	10	15	0
1979–80	Fort Worth Texans	CHL	10	5	7	12	8	—	—	—	—	—
1979–80	Colorado Rockies	NHL	2	0	0	0	0	—	—	—	—	—
1980–81	Springfield Indians	AHL	48	21	40	61	36	7	3	8	11	4
1981–82	ECS Innsbruck	AUT	28	21	28	49	38	—	—	—	—	—
1981–82	Hershey Bears	AHL	18	5	14	19	2	5	2	7	9	0
1982–83	ECS Innsbruck	AUT	28	26	30	56	44	—	—	—	—	—
1982–83	Hershey Bears	AHL	14	8	9	17	2	4	1	0	1	0
1983–84	Français Volants Paris	FRA-2	—	—	—	—	—	—	—	—	—	—
1984–85	Français Volants Paris	FRA	25	44	16	60	—	—	—	—	—	—
1985–86	Français Volants Paris	FRA	32	32	41	73	—	—	—	—	—	—
1986–87	Français Volants Paris	FRA	36	50	35	85	52	—	—	—	—	—
1987–88	Français Volants Paris	FRA	25	30	23	53	38	—	—	—	—	—
AHL totals			285	116	197	313	131	26	11	25	36	4
NHL totals			47	10	12	22	8	2	0	0	0	0
