= Bobby Simpson (ice hockey) =

Canadian ice hockey player (born 1956)

- Born: November 17, 1956 (age 69) Caughnawaga, Quebec, Canada
- Height: 6 ft 0 in (183 cm)
- Weight: 185 lb (84 kg; 13 st 3 lb)
- Position: Left wing
- Shot: Left
- Played for: Pittsburgh Penguins; St. Louis Blues; Atlanta Flames
- NHL draft: 28th overall, 1976; Atlanta Flames
- WHA draft: 4th overall, 1976; Indianapolis Racers
- Playing career: 1976–1987; 1996–1997

Robert Samuel Simpson (born November 17, 1956) is a Canadian former professional ice hockey forward who played 175 games in the National Hockey League for the Atlanta Flames, Pittsburgh Penguins, and St. Louis Blues.

== Early life ==
Simpson was born in Caughnawaga, Quebec. As a youth, he played in the 1968 and 1969 Quebec International Pee-Wee Hockey Tournaments with a minor ice hockey team from Caughnawaga.

== Career ==
Simpson played three years of major junior hockey in the QMJHL for the Sherbrooke Castors and had a ten-year career as a professional. Drafted as the fourth overall pick in the WHA Amateur Draft, Bobby Simpson still went on to play in the NHL instead where he was the twenty-eighth draft pick. During his three years in the QMJHL, Simpson collected 245 points and another 64 at the NHL level.

== Personal life ==
Simpson is also a full-blood Native American from the Mohawk band near Kahnawake.

== Career statistics ==
=== Regular season and playoffs ===
			Regular season					Playoffs
Season	Team	League	GP	G	A	Pts	PIM	GP	G	A	Pts	PIM
1973–74	Sherbrooke Castors	QMJHL	64	6	21	27	138	5	0	0	0	20
1974–75	Sherbrooke Castors	QMJHL	69	38	47	85	150	13	10	12	22	26
1975–76	Sherbrooke Castors	QMJHL	68	56	77	133	128	17	11	14	25	19
1976–77	Atlanta Flames	NHL	72	13	10	23	45	2	0	1	1	0
1977–78	Atlanta Flames	NHL	55	10	8	18	49	2	0	0	0	2
1978–79	Tulsa Oilers	CHL	14	8	8	16	34	—	—	—	—	—
1979–80	Salt Lake Golden Eagles	CHL	41	19	12	31	58	12	4	5	9	9
1979–80	St. Louis Blues	NHL	18	2	2	4	0	—	—	—	—	—
1980–81	Muskegon Mohawks	IHL	42	17	26	43	42	3	2	1	3	0
1980–81	Salt Lake Golden Eagles	CHL	8	2	1	3	4	—	—	—	—	—
1981–82	Pittsburgh Penguins	NHL	26	9	9	18	4	2	0	0	0	0
1981–82	Erie Blades	AHL	48	25	23	48	45	—	—	—	—	—
1982–83	Baltimore Skipjacks	AHL	61	24	27	51	24	—	—	—	—	—
1982–83	Pittsburgh Penguins	NHL	4	1	0	1	0	—	—	—	—	—
1983–84	Baltimore Skipjacks	AHL	71	16	16	32	36	10	7	5	12	8
1984–85	Indianapolis Checkers	IHL	55	16	24	40	65	—	—	—	—	—
1984–85	Salt Lake Golden Eagles	IHL	28	7	11	18	25	7	1	0	1	19
1985–86	Salt Lake Golden Eagles	IHL	74	6	38	44	37	5	2	3	5	8
1986–87	Salt Lake Golden Eagles	IHL	9	2	3	5	12	—	—	—	—	—
1986–87	Peoria Rivermen	IHL	58	14	29	43	32	—	—	—	—	—
1996–97	Saginaw Lumber Kings	CoHL	13	3	2	5	4	—	—	—	—	—
NHL totals			175	35	29	64	98	6	0	1	1	2
