= Anders Håkansson =

Swedish ice hockey player

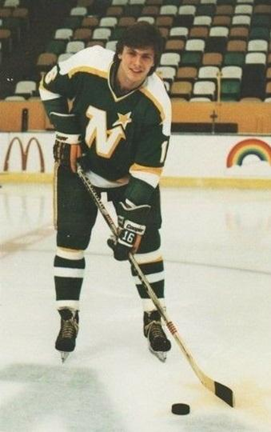
- Born: April 27, 1956 (age 70) Munkfors, Sweden
- Height: 6 ft 2 in (188 cm)
- Weight: 190 lb (86 kg; 13 st 8 lb)
- Position: Left wing
- Shot: Left
- Played for: Minnesota North Stars; Pittsburgh Penguins; Los Angeles Kings
- National team: Sweden
- NHL draft: 134th overall, 1976; St. Louis Blues
- WHA draft: 103rd overall, 1976; Winnipeg Jets
- Playing career: 1975–1986

Per Anders Håkansson (born April 27, 1956) is a Swedish retired professional ice hockey player who played 330 games in the National Hockey League (NHL) for the Minnesota North Stars, Pittsburgh Penguins, and Los Angeles Kings. Internationally, he played for the Swedish juniors at the 1976 World Junior Ice Hockey Championships, and for Sweden men's national ice hockey team at the 1981 World Ice Hockey Championships and at the Canada Cup in 1981 and 1984.

== Career statistics ==
=== Regular season and playoffs ===
			Regular season					Playoffs
Season	Team	League	GP	G	A	Pts	PIM	GP	G	A	Pts	PIM
1974–75	Malmbergets AIF	SWE-2	—	—	—	—	—	—	—	—	—	—
1974–75	AIK	SWE	2	0	0	0	0	—	—	—	—	—
1975–76	AIK	SEL	18	4	4	8	6	—	—	—	—	—
1976–77	AIK	SEL	5	0	0	0	0	—	—	—	—	—
1977–78	AIK	SEL	27	8	4	12	12	—	—	—	—	—
1978–79	AIK	SEL	36	12	9	21	37	—	—	—	—	—
1979–80	AIK	SEL	36	14	10	24	32	—	—	—	—	—
1980–81	AIK	SEL	22	5	11	16	18	—	—	—	—	—
1981–82	Minnesota North Stars	NHL	72	12	4	16	29	3	0	0	0	2
1982–83	Minnesota North Stars	NHL	5	0	0	0	9	—	—	—	—	—
1982–83	Pittsburgh Penguins	NHL	62	9	12	21	26	—	—	—	—	—
1983–84	Los Angeles Kings	NHL	80	15	17	32	41	—	—	—	—	—
1984–85	Los Angeles Kings	NHL	73	12	12	24	28	3	0	0	0	0
1985–86	Los Angeles Kings	NHL	38	4	1	5	8	—	—	—	—	—
SEL totals			150	47	38	85	111	—	—	—	—	—
NHL totals			330	52	46	98	141	6	0	0	0	2

=== International ===
Medal record

Representing Sweden

Men's ice hockey

Canada Cup
Silver medal – second place	1984 Canada	

Year	Team	Event	GP	G	A	Pts	PIM
1976	Sweden	WJC	4	3	1	4	8
1981	Sweden	WC	7	4	0	4	8
1981	Sweden	CC	5	1	1	2	4
1984	Sweden	CC	8	1	1	2	2
Senior totals			20	6	2	8	14
