= Doug Patey =

Canadian ice hockey player

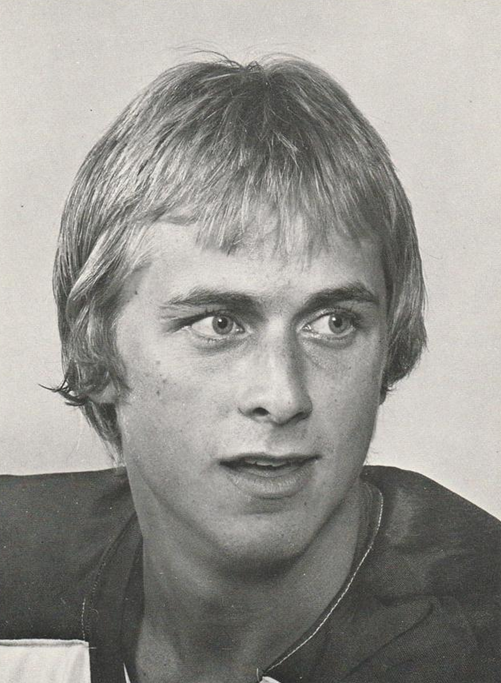
- Born: December 20, 1956 (age 69) Toronto, Ontario, Canada
- Height: 5 ft 11 in (180 cm)
- Weight: 180 lb (82 kg; 12 st 12 lb)
- Position: Forward
- Played for: Washington Capitals
- NHL draft: 73rd overall, 1976; Washington Capitals
- WHA draft: 66th overall, 1976; Phoenix Roadrunners
- Playing career: 1976–1980

Douglas Edward Patey (born December 28, 1956) is a Canadian former ice hockey player. Patey was drafted in 1976 by the Washington Capitals of the National Hockey League and the Phoenix Roadrunners of the World Hockey Association, and played 45 games in the National Hockey League with the Washington Capitals from 1976 to 1979. Patey was born in Toronto, Ontario, Canada, and his brother, Larry Patey, also played in the NHL.

== Career statistics ==
=== Regular season and playoffs ===
			Regular season					Playoffs
Season	Team	League	GP	G	A	Pts	PIM	GP	G	A	Pts	PIM
1972–73	Dixie Beehives	OPJAHL	2	1	1	2	0	—	—	—	—	—
1973–74	Dixie Beehives	OPJAHL	42	31	30	61	28	—	—	—	—	—
1974–75	Sault Ste. Marie Greyhounds	OMJHL	64	31	28	59	20	—	—	—	—	—
1975–76	Sault Ste. Marie Greyhounds	OMJHL	59	45	65	110	52	12	5	10	15	8
1976–77	Washington Capitals	NHL	37	3	1	4	6	—	—	—	—	—
1976–77	Dayton Gems	IHL	38	11	16	27	23	4	1	1	2	2
1977–78	Washington Capitals	NHL	2	0	1	1	0	—	—	—	—	—
1977–78	Hershey Bears	AHL	79	27	33	60	23	—	—	—	—	—
1978–79	Washington Capitals	NHL	6	1	0	1	2	—	—	—	—	—
1978–79	Hershey Bears	AHL	74	22	24	46	16	4	1	0	1	0
1979–80	Cincinnati Stingers	CHL	14	5	9	14	2	—	—	—	—	—
1979–80	Houston Apollos	CHL	33	15	15	30	16	—	—	—	—	—
1980–81	SaPKo	FIN-2	12	12	6	18	14	—	—	—	—	—
AHL totals			153	49	57	106	39	4	1	0	1	0
NHL totals			45	4	2	6	8	—	—	—	—	—
