= Blair Chapman =

Canadian ice hockey player (born 1956)

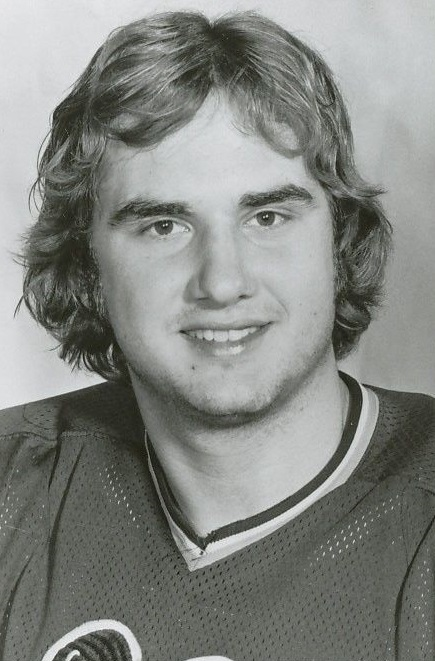
- Born: June 13, 1956 (age 69) Lloydminster, Alberta, Canada
- Height: 5 ft 11 in (180 cm)
- Weight: 185 lb (84 kg; 13 st 3 lb)
- Position: Right wing
- Shot: Right
- Played for: Pittsburgh Penguins; St. Louis Blues
- NHL draft: 2nd overall, 1976; Pittsburgh Penguins
- WHA draft: 1st overall, 1976; Edmonton Oilers
- Playing career: 1976–1983

Blair Douglas Chapman (born June 13, 1956) is a Canadian former professional ice hockey player.

== Playing career ==
Chapman was drafted number one overall in the 1976 WHA Amateur Draft by the Edmonton Oilers, and also number two overall in the 1976 NHL Amateur Draft by the Pittsburgh Penguins. He was a highly touted prospect due to his stellar performance with the Saskatoon Blades of the Western Hockey League; in his draft year he recorded 157 points in 69 games. He never really lived up to his potential professionally though, and recorded 231 career points in 402 career NHL games for the Penguins and the St. Louis Blues. He retired in 1983.

== Career statistics ==
			Regular season					Playoffs
Season	Team	League	GP	G	A	Pts	PIM	GP	G	A	Pts	PIM
1972–73	Kelowna Buckaroos	BCHL	52	31	49	80	80	—	—	—	—	—
1973–74	Saskatoon Blades	WCHL	56	36	28	64	61	5	1	2	3	5
1974–75	Saskatoon Blades	WCHL	65	41	44	85	92	17	9	9	18	32
1975–76	Saskatoon Blades	WCHL	69	71	86	157	67	20	24	19	43	21
1976–77	Pittsburgh Penguins	NHL	80	14	23	37	16	3	1	1	2	7
1977–78	Pittsburgh Penguins	NHL	75	24	20	44	37	—	—	—	—	—
1978–79	Pittsburgh Penguins	NHL	71	10	8	18	18	7	1	0	1	2
1979–80	Pittsburgh Penguins	NHL	1	0	0	0	0	—	—	—	—	—
1979–80	St. Louis Blues	NHL	63	25	26	51	28	3	0	0	0	0
1980–81	St. Louis Blues	NHL	55	20	26	46	41	9	2	5	7	6
1981–82	St. Louis Blues	NHL	18	6	11	17	8	3	0	0	0	0
1981–82	Salt Lake Golden Eagles	CHL	1	1	0	1	0	—	—	—	—	—
1982–83	St. Louis Blues	NHL	39	7	11	18	10	—	—	—	—	—
1982–83	Salt Lake Golden Eagles	CHL	22	17	6	23	20	6	4	3	7	0
NHL totals			402	106	125	231	158	25	4	6	10	15

== Awards ==
- WCHL Second All-Star Team – 1976

Preceded by Gordie Laxton	Pittsburgh Penguins first-round draft pick 1976	Succeeded by Mike Bullard
Preceded by Claude Larose	WHA First Overall Draft Pick; 1976	Succeeded by Scott Campbell
Preceded by Barry Dean	Edmonton Oilers first-round draft pick 1976	Succeeded by Mike Crombeen
