= Jouni Rinne =

Finnish ice hockey player

- Born: 12 March 1956 (age 69); Rauma, Finland
- Height: 5 ft 9 in (175 cm)
- Weight: 185 lb (84 kg; 13 st 3 lb)
- Position: Forward
- Shot: Left
- Played for: SM-liiga; Lukko; KalPa; 1. Divisioona; HPK; FPS; KooKoo; Suomi-sarja; Junkkarit HT; 2. Divisioona; YJK
- NHL draft: 95th overall, 1976; California Seals
- WHA draft: 101st overall, 1976; Phoenix Roadrunners
- Playing career: 1975–1991; 1997–2000

Jouni Rinne (born 12 March 1956) is a retired professional ice hockey player who played in the SM-liiga. He played for Lukko, HPK, KalPa, KooKoo, and YJK. He was inducted into the Finnish Hockey Hall of Fame in 2005.

Rinne is the only Finnish player ever to be drafted by California Seals.
