= 1976 WHA amateur draft =

General information
- Dates: May 17 & May 26, 1976

Overview
- 116 total selections in 10 rounds
- First selection: (Canada) Blair Chapman; Selected by: Edmonton Oilers

The 1976 WHA amateur draft was the fourth draft held by the World Hockey Association.

== Selections by round ==
Below are listed the selections in the 1976 WHA amateur draft.

Selections by round

Round 1 | Round 2 | Round 3 | Round 4 | Round 5 | Round 6 | Round 7 | Round 8 | Round 9 | Round 10

=== Round 1 ===
#	Player	Nationality	WHA team	College/junior/club team
1	Blair Chapman (RW)	Canada	Edmonton Oilers	Saskatoon Blades (WCHL)
2	Peter Marsh (LW)	Canada	Cincinnati Stingers	Sherbrooke Castors (QMJHL)
3	Glen Sharpley (C)	Canada	Cleveland Crusaders	Hull Festivals (QMJHL)
4	Bobby Simpson (LW)	Canada	Indianapolis Racers	Sherbrooke Castors (QMJHL)
5	Dave Farrish (D)	Canada	San Diego Mariners	Sudbury Wolves (OHA)
6	Bernie Federko (C)	Canada	Edmonton Oilers (from Phoenix)	Saskatoon Blades (WCHL)
7	Randy Carlyle (D)	Canada	Cincinnati Stingers (from Calgary)	Sudbury Wolves (OHA)
8	Bjorn Johansson (D)	Sweden	Toronto Toros (from Quebec)	Orebro IK (Sweden D1)
9	Thomas Gradin (F)	Sweden	Winnipeg Jets	MoDo AIK (Elitserien)

The Toronto Toros, New England Whalers and Houston Aeros lost their first round picks for having signed underage juniors in 1975: Toronto for Mark Napier, New England for Gordie Roberts and Houston for John Tonelli.

=== Round 2 ===
#	Player	Nationality	WHA team	College/junior/club team
10	Rick Green (D)	Canada	Quebec Nordiques (from Toronto)	London Knights (OHA)
11	Kent Nilsson (F)	Sweden	Toronto Toros (from Edmonton via Houston)	Djurgardens IF (Elitserien)
12	Don Murdoch (RW)	Canada	Cincinnati Stingers	Medicine Hat Tigers (WCHL)
13	Mike Fidler (LW)	United States	New England Whalers	Boston University (ECAC)
14	Rod Schutt (LW)	Canada	Cleveland Crusaders	Sudbury Wolves (OHA)
15	Alex McKendry (F)	Canada	Indianapolis Racers	Sudbury Wolves (OHA)
16	Greg Carroll (C)	Canada	Cincinnati Stingers (from San Diego via New England)	Medicine Hat Tigers (WCHL)
17	Clayton Pachal (C)	Canada	Winnipeg Jets (from Phoenix)	New Westminster Bruins (WCHL)
18	David Shand (D)	Canada	Calgary Cowboys	Peterborough Petes (OHA)
19	Bob Manno (F)	Canada	Quebec Nordiques	St. Catharines Black Hawks (OHA)
20	Tom Rowe (RW)	United States	Winnipeg Jets	London Knights (OHA)
21	Peter Lee (LW)	Canada	Toronto Toros (from Houston)	Ottawa 67's (OHA)
22	Morris Lukowich (LW)	Canada	Houston Aeros (from Minnesota)	Medicine Hat Tigers (WCHL)

=== Round 3 ===
#	Player	Nationality	WHA team	College/junior/club team
23	Romano Carlucci (F)	Canada	San Diego Mariners (from Toronto)	Sault Ste. Marie Greyhounds (OHA)
24	Paul Gardner (C)	Canada	Toronto Toros (from Edmonton)	Oshawa Generals (OHA)
25	Mark Suzor (D)	Canada	San Diego Mariners (from Cincinnati)	Kingston Canadians (OHA)
26	Fred Williams (C)	Canada	New England Whalers	Saskatoon Blades (WCHL)
27	Jeff McDill (RW)	Canada	Cleveland Crusaders	Victoria Cougars (WCHL)
28	Harold Phillipoff (W)	Canada	Edmonton Oilers (from Indianapolis)	New Westminster Bruins (WCHL)
29	Tony Horvath (D)	Canada	San Diego Mariners	Sault Ste. Marie Greyhounds (OHA)
30	Drew Callander (C)	Canada	Edmonton Oilers (from Phoenix)	Regina Pats (WCHL)
31	Dave Debol (C)	United States	New England Whalers (from Calgary)	University of Michigan (WCHA)
32	Al Glendinning (D)	Canada	Quebec Nordiques	Calgary Centennials (WCHL)
33	Steve Clippingdale (LW)	Canada	Winnipeg Jets	New Westminster Bruins (WCHL)
34	Jim Roberts (LW)	Canada	Houston Aeros	Ottawa 67's (OHA)

=== Round 4 ===
#	Player	Nationality	WHA team	College/junior/club team
35	Don Lemieux (D)	Canada	Toronto Toros	Trois-Rivieres Draveurs (QMJHL)
36	Brian Sutter (LW)	Canada	Edmonton Oilers	Lethbridge Broncos (WCHL)
37	Barry Melrose (D)	Canada	Cincinnati Stingers	Kamloops Chiefs (WCHL)
38	Mike Kaszycki (F)	Canada	New England Whalers	Sault Ste. Marie Greyhounds (OHA)
39	Rocky Maze (LW)	Canada	Cleveland Crusaders	Edmonton Oil Kings (WCHL)
40	Dave Dornseif (D)	United States	Indianapolis Racers	Providence College (ECAC)
41	John Smrke (C)	Canada	San Diego Mariners	Toronto Marlboros (OHA)
42	Kari Makkonen (F)	Finland	Phoenix Roadrunners	Assat Pori (Liiga)
43	Alain Belanger (RW)	Canada	Calgary Cowboys	Sherbrooke Castors (QMJHL)
44	Maurice Barrette (G)	Canada	Quebec Nordiques	Quebec Remparts (QMJHL)
45	Goran Lindblom (D)	Sweden	Winnipeg Jets	Skelleftea AIK (Elitserien)
46	Mike Fedorko (D)	Canada	Houston Aeros	Hamilton Fincups (OHA)

=== Round 5 ===
#	Player	Nationality	WHA team	College/junior/club team
47	Vern Stenlund (C)	Canada	Cleveland Crusaders (from Toronto)	London Knights (OHA)
48	Yvon Vautour (F)	Canada	Edmonton Oilers	Laval National (QMJHL)
49	Bill Baker (D)	United States	New England Whalers (from Cincinnati)	University of Minnesota (WCHA)
50	Mike Liut (G)	Canada	New England Whalers	Bowling Green State University (CCHA)
51	Bob Miller (W)	United States	Cleveland Crusaders	U.S. National Team
52	Jean Gagnon (D)	Canada	Indianapolis Racers	Quebec Remparts (QMJHL)
53	Archie King (RW)	Canada	San Diego Mariners	Hamilton Fincups (OHA)
54	Juhani Wallenius (F)	Finland	Phoenix Roadrunners	Lukko Rauma (Liiga)
55	Bruce Baker (RW)	Canada	Calgary Cowboys	Ottawa 67's (OHA)
56	Garth MacGuigan (C)	Canada	Quebec Nordiques	Montreal Juniors (QMJHL)
57	Doug Johnston (D)	Canada	Winnipeg Jets	Lethbridge Broncos (WCHL)
58	Larry Skinner (C)	Canada	Houston Aeros	Ottawa 67's (OHA)

=== Round 6 ===
#	Player	Nationality	WHA team	College/junior/club team
59	Dan Djakalovic (F)	Canada	Toronto Toros	Kitchener Rangers (OHA)
60	Tim Williams (D)	Canada	Edmonton Oilers	Victoria Cougars (WCHL)
61	Joe Oslin (D)	United States	Cincinnati Stingers	University of Vermont (ECAC)
62	Dwight Schofield (D)	Canada	New England Whalers	London Knights (OHA)
63	Rob Flockhart (LW)	Canada	Cleveland Crusaders	Kamloops Chiefs (WCHL)
64	Joe Kowal (LW)	Canada	Indianapolis Racers	Hamilton Fincups (OHA)
65	Rick Hodgson (D)	Canada	San Diego Mariners	Calgary Centennials (WCHL)
66	Doug Patey (F)	Canada	Phoenix Roadrunners	Sault Ste. Marie Greyhounds (OHA)
67	Lorry Gloeckner (D)	Canada	Calgary Cowboys	Victoria Cougars (WCHL)
68	Claude Periard (F)	Canada	Quebec Nordiques	Trois-Rivieres Draveurs (QMJHL)
69	Fred Berry (C)	Canada	Winnipeg Jets	New Westminster Bruins (WCHL)
70	Kevin Schamehorn (RW)	Canada	Houston Aeros	New Westminster Bruins (WCHL)

=== Round 7 ===
#	Player	Nationality	WHA team	College/junior/club team
71	Mike McEwen (D)	Canada	Toronto Toros	Toronto Marlboros (OHA)
72	Gord Blumenschein (C)	Canada	Edmonton Oilers	Winnipeg Clubs (WCHL)
73	Paul Skidmore (G)	United States	Cincinnati Stingers	Boston College (ECAC)
74	Warren Young (F)	Canada	New England Whalers	Michigan Tech (WCHA)
75	Mark Earp (G)	Canada	Cleveland Crusaders	Kamloops Chiefs (WCHL)
76	Greg Malone (C)	Canada	Indianapolis Racers	Oshawa Generals (OHA)
77	Rob Tudor (C)	Canada	San Diego Mariners	Regina Pats (WCHL)
78	Mark Davidson (LW)	Canada	Phoenix Roadrunners	Flin Flon Bombers (WCHL)
79	Phil Verchota (F)	United States	Calgary Cowboys	University of Minnesota (WCHA)
80	Denis Charbonneau (G)	Canada	Quebec Nordiques	Laval National (QMJHL)
81	Greg Craig (C)	Canada	Winnipeg Jets	St. Catharines Black Hawks (OHA)
82	Mike Hordy (D)	Canada	Houston Aeros	Sault Ste. Marie Greyhounds (OHA)

=== Round 8 ===
#	Player	Nationality	WHA team	College/junior/club team
83	Mike Kitchen (D)	Canada	Toronto Toros	Toronto Marlboros (OHA)
84	John Tavella (LW)	Canada	Edmonton Oilers	Sault Ste. Marie Greyhounds (OHA)
85	Stuart Ostlund (C)	Canada	Cincinnati Stingers	Michigan Tech (WCHA)
86	Ken Morrow (D)	United States	New England Whalers	Bowling Green State University (CCHA)
87	Ron Zanussi (F)	Canada	Cleveland Crusaders	London Knights (OHA)
88	Jim Kirkpatrick (D)	Canada	Indianapolis Racers	Toronto Marlboros (OHA)
89	Claude Legris (G)	Canada	San Diego Mariners	Sorel Black Hawks (QMJHL)
90	Jari Laiho (F)	Finland	Phoenix Roadrunners	Lukko Rauma (Liiga)
91	Don Jackson (D)	United States	Calgary Cowboys	University of Notre Dame (WCHA)
92	Brian Granfield (D)	Canada	Winnipeg Jets	Brandon Wheat Kings (WCHL)
93	Larry Riggin (D)	Canada	Houston Aeros	London Knights (OHA)

=== Round 9 ===
#	Player	Nationality	WHA team	College/junior/club team
94	Marc Desforges (F)	Canada	Toronto Toros	Chicoutimi Sagueneens (QMJHL)
95	Al Dumba (RW)	Canada	Edmonton Oilers	Regina Pats (WCHL)
96	Fern LeBlanc (LW)	Canada	Cincinnati Stingers	Sherbrooke Castors (QMJHL)
97	Ed Clarey (F)	Canada	New England Whalers	Cornwall Royals (QMJHL)
98	Charlie Skjodt (C)	Canada	Cleveland Crusaders	Windsor Spitfires (OHA)
99	Rik Garcia (D)	Canada	Indianapolis Racers	Hull Festivals (QMJHL)
100	Don Moores (C)	Canada	San Diego Mariners	Kamloops Chiefs (WCHL)
101	Jouni Rinne (F)	Finland	Phoenix Roadrunners	Lukko Rauma (Liiga)
102	Rob Palmer (D)	Canada	Calgary Cowboys	University of Michigan (WCHA)
103	Anders Hakansson (F)	Sweden	Winnipeg Jets	AIK IF (Elitserien)
104	Bill Wells (LW)	Canada	Houston Aeros	Cornwall Royals (QMJHL)

=== Round 10 ===
#	Player	Nationality	WHA team	College/junior/club team
105	Brian Dillon (F)	Canada	Toronto Toros	Oshawa Generals (OHA)
106	Jim Bedard (G)	Canada	Edmonton Oilers	Sudbury Wolves (OHA)
107	Terry Ballingall (D)	Canada	Cincinnati Stingers	Flin Flon Bombers (WCHL)
108	Jon Hammond (LW)	Canada	New England Whalers	Regina Pats (WCHL)
109	Larry McRae (G)	Canada	Cleveland Crusaders	Windsor Spitfires (OHA)
110	Remi Levesque (C)	Canada	Indianapolis Racers	Quebec Remparts (QMJHL)
111	Ron Roscoe (D)	Canada	San Diego Mariners	Hamilton Fincups (OHA)
112	Hannu Helander (D)	Finland	Phoenix Roadrunners	Ilves (Liiga)
113	Cal Sandbeck (D)	United States	Calgary Cowboys	University of Denver (WCHA)
114	Pierre Brassard (F)	Canada	Quebec Nordiques	Cornwall Royals (QMJHL)
115	Jorgen Pettersson (F)	Sweden	Winnipeg Jets	Vastra Frolunda (Elitserien)
116	Bob Pazzelli (F)	United States	Houston Aeros	University of Denver (WCHA)

== Draftees based on nationality ==
Rank	Country	Amount
	North America	105
1	Canada	92
2	United States	13
	Europe	11
3	Sweden	6
4	Finland	5

== See also ==
- 1976 NHL Amateur Draft
- 1976–77 WHA season

Preceded by 1975 WHA amateur draft	WHA Draft; 1976	Succeeded by 1977 WHA amateur draft
