= Ron Zanussi =

Canadian ice hockey player

- Born: August 31, 1956 (age 69) Toronto, Ontario, Canada
- Height: 5 ft 11 in (180 cm)
- Weight: 180 lb (82 kg; 12 st 12 lb)
- Position: Right wing
- Shot: Right
- Played for: Minnesota North Stars; Toronto Maple Leafs
- NHL draft: 51st overall, 1976; Minnesota North Stars
- WHA draft: 87th overall, 1976; Cleveland Crusaders
- Playing career: 1976–1984

Ronald Kenneth Zanussi (born August 31, 1956) is a Canadian former professional ice hockey right winger who played five seasons in the National Hockey League (NHL) for the Minnesota North Stars and Toronto Maple Leafs between 1977 and 1982.

== Playing career ==
Zanussi was born in Toronto, Ontario, and played minor hockey for the West Hill Minor Hockey League team in the SHA (Scarborough Hockey Association). As a youth, he played in the 1969 Quebec International Pee-Wee Hockey Tournament with a minor ice hockey team from Dorset Park. He later played with the London Knights of the OHA. He was selected in the third round, 51st overall, by the Minnesota North Stars in the 1976 NHL Amateur Draft and in the eighth round, 87th overall by the Cleveland Crusaders in the 1976 WHA Amateur Draft. He played his first pro year with the Fort Wayne Komets of the International Hockey League (IHL) in 1976–77, scoring 53 goals and was named the co-winner of the IHL's rookie of the year award. He joined the North Stars the following season, playing the majority of the next four years in Minnesota before moving onto the Maple Leafs for two. Zanussi retired in 1984 having played 299 NHL games and scoring 52 goals.

== Career statistics ==
=== Regular season and playoffs ===
			Regular season					Playoffs
Season	Team	League	GP	G	A	Pts	PIM	GP	G	A	Pts	PIM
1973–74	London Knights	OHA	65	21	20	41	110	—	—	—	—	—
1974–75	London Knights	OMJHL	69	34	52	86	123	—	—	—	—	—
1975–76	London Knights	OMJHL	40	17	19	36	55	5	2	1	3	8
1976–77	Fort Wayne Komets	IHL	77	53	33	86	138	9	9	6	15	20
1977–78	Minnesota North Stars	NHL	68	15	17	32	89	—	—	—	—	—
1977–78	Fort Worth Texans	CHL	6	2	1	3	5	—	—	—	—	—
1978–79	Minnesota North Stars	NHL	63	14	16	30	82	—	—	—	—	—
1978–79	Oklahoma City Stars	CHL	4	3	1	4	6	—	—	—	—	—
1979–80	Minnesota North Stars	NHL	72	14	31	45	93	14	0	4	4	17
1980–81	Minnesota North Stars	NHL	41	6	11	17	89	—	—	—	—	—
1980–81	Oklahoma City Stars	CHL	3	3	2	5	5	—	—	—	—	—
1980–81	Toronto Maple Leafs	NHL	12	3	0	3	6	3	0	0	0	0
1981–82	Toronto Maple Leafs	NHL	43	0	8	8	14	—	—	—	—	—
1981–82	Cincinnati Tigers	CHL	21	12	9	21	32	4	0	2	2	4
1982–83	St. Catharines Saints	AHL	18	5	5	10	8	—	—	—	—	—
1982–83	Sherbrooke Jets	AHL	52	4	17	21	45	—	—	—	—	—
1983–84	St. Catharines Saints	AHL	59	4	15	19	59	—	—	—	—	—
NHL totals			299	52	83	135	373	17	0	4	4	17
