= Juhani Wallenius =

Finnish ice hockey player (1956–2014)

- Born: 7 February 1956 Rauma, Finland
- Died: 25 February 2014 (aged 58)
- Position: Forward
- Shot: Left
- Played for: Ässät; Lukko
- NHL draft: 135th overall, 1976; St. Louis Blues
- WHA draft: 57th overall, 1976; Phoenix Roadrunners
- Playing career: 1974–1986

Juhani Wallenius (7 February 1956 – 27 February 2014) was a Finnish ice hockey forward who mainly played for Rauman Lukko.

In Finland, Wallenius played in the SM-Liiga (Finnish Elite League) and SM-sarja (Finnish Championship Series). He was selected by the St. Louis Blues in the 1976 NHL Amateur Draft, and the Phoenix Roadrunners in the 1976 WHA Amateur Draft, but never moved to North America.

== Career ==
Wallenius played 330 games in Liiga and put up 305 points, he is considered as a cult player for Lukko.
