= Greg Carroll (ice hockey) =

Canadian ice hockey player (born 1956)

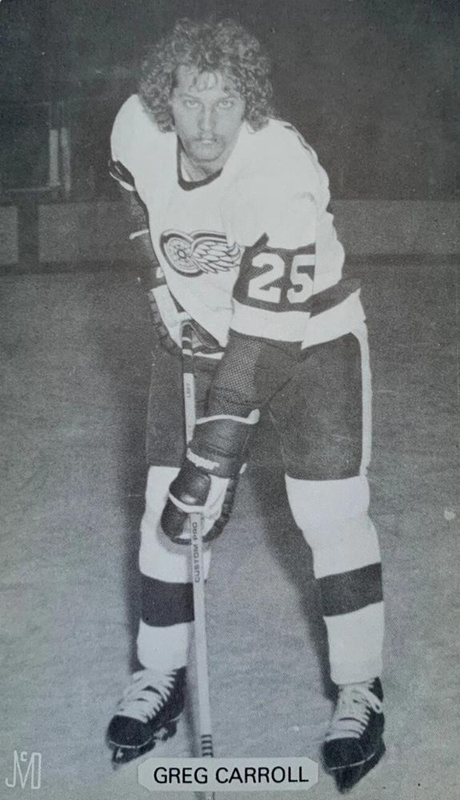
- Carroll in 1978 postcard
- Born: November 10, 1956 (age 69) Gimli, Manitoba, Canada
- Height: 6 ft 0 in (183 cm)
- Weight: 185 lb (84 kg; 13 st 3 lb)
- Position: Centre
- Shot: Left
- Played for: Cincinnati Stingers; New England Whalers; Washington Capitals; Detroit Red Wings; Hartford Whalers
- NHL draft: 15th overall, 1976; Washington Capitals
- WHA draft: 16th overall, 1976; Cincinnati Stingers
- Playing career: 1976–1980

Gregory John Carroll (born November 10, 1956) is a Canadian former professional ice hockey centre.

== Career ==
Drafted in 1976 by both the Washington Capitals of the National Hockey League and the Cincinnati Stingers of the World Hockey Association, Carroll chose to play with the Stingers. He would also play for the New England Whalers. After playing two seasons in the WHA, he signed with the Capitals. He also played for the Detroit Red Wings and Hartford Whalers.

== Career statistics ==
=== Regular season and playoffs ===
			Regular season					Playoffs
Season	Team	League	GP	G	A	Pts	PIM	GP	G	A	Pts	PIM
1973–74	Edmonton Canadians	AJHL	—	—	—	—	—	—	—	—	—	—
1974–75	Medicine Hat Tigers	WCHL	70	22	37	59	77	3	3	2	5	0
1975–76	Medicine Hat Tigers	WCHL	71	60	111	171	118	9	4	11	15	2
1976–77	Cincinnati Stingers	WHA	77	15	39	54	53	4	1	2	3	0
1977–78	Cincinnati Stingers	WHA	26	6	13	19	36	—	—	—	—	—
1977–78	New England Whalers	WHA	48	9	14	23	27	—	—	—	—	—
1978–79	Washington Capitals	NHL	24	5	6	11	12	—	—	—	—	—
1978–79	Detroit Red Wings	NHL	36	2	9	11	8	—	—	—	—	—
1979–80	Hartford Whalers	NHL	71	13	19	32	24	—	—	—	—	—
1979–80	Springfield Indians	AHL	6	2	2	4	2	—	—	—	—	—
1985–86	Billings Marlboros	CnHL	9	17	29	46	0	—	—	—	—	—
WHA totals			151	30	66	96	116	4	1	2	3	0
NHL totals			131	20	34	54	44	—	—	—	—	—

== Awards ==
- WCHL Second All-Star Team – 1976

Preceded by Rick Green	Washington Capitals first-round draft pick 1976	Succeeded by Robert Picard
