= Mike Crombeen =

Canadian ice hockey player (born 1957)

- Born: April 16, 1957 (age 68) Sarnia, Ontario, Canada
- Height: 5 ft 11 in (180 cm)
- Weight: 190 lb (86 kg; 13 st 8 lb)
- Position: Right wing
- Shot: Right
- Played for: Cleveland Barons; St. Louis Blues; Hartford Whalers
- NHL draft: 5th overall, 1977; Cleveland Barons
- WHA draft: 4th overall, 1977; Edmonton Oilers
- Playing career: 1978–1985

Michael Joseph Crombeen (born April 16, 1957) is a Canadian former professional ice hockey player, who played eight seasons in the National Hockey League (NHL). His son B. J. also played in the NHL.

== Playing career ==
Crombeen was born in Sarnia, Ontario. As a youth, he played in the 1969 Quebec International Pee-Wee Hockey Tournament with a minor ice hockey team from Sarnia. He played his junior hockey with the Kingston Canadians of the OHA from 1973 to 1977, playing in 244 games, while getting 322 points (160 goals-162 assists). His best season was 1974–75, when he earned 114 points (56G-58A) in 69 games. In 19 career playoff games, he earned 21 points (8G-13A). Crombeen was drafted by the Cleveland Barons with the 5th overall pick in the 1977 NHL amateur draft, and was also selected by the Edmonton Oilers with the 4th overall pick in the 1977 WHA Amateur Draft. Crombeen elected to join the Barons.

Crombeen split the 1977–78 season between the minors and the NHL, playing with the Salt Lake Golden Eagles of the CHL, getting 8 points (4G-4A) in 12 games, and the Binghamton Dusters of the AHL, getting 3 points (1G-2A) in 13 games, along with 48 games with the Cleveland Barons, scoring 7 points (3G-4A). As the Barons franchise folded and many of their players were absorbed by the Minnesota North Stars, Crombeen found himself left unprotected, and was picked up by the St. Louis Blues in the dispersal draft.

Crombeen then started the 1978–79 season with the Golden Eagles, scoring 15 points (6G-9A) in 30 games, before joining the St. Louis Blues for 37 games, getting 11 points (3G-8A).

In 1979–80, Crombeen spent the entire season with the Blues, getting 22 points (10G-12A) in 71 games, and appeared in his first NHL playoffs, going pointless in 2 games. Crombeen then registered 23 points (9G-14A) in 69 games in 1980–81, and chipped in with 3 goals in 11 playoff games, including a goal in double overtime that clinched the Blues' first-round series against the Pittsburgh Penguins. 1981–82 was the most productive season of Crombeen's career, getting a career high 27 points (19G-8A) in 71 games, and earned 4 points (3G-1A) in 10 playoff games. He played in all 80 games in the 1982–83 season, getting 17 points (6G-11A), then earned an assist in 4 playoff games. On October 3, 1983, the Hartford Whalers picked up Crombeen in the waiver draft.

Crombeen spent the 1983–84 season with the Whalers, getting 5 points (1G-4A) in 56 games, then split the 1984–85 season with Hartford, getting 11 points (4G-7A) in 46 games, and with the Binghamton Whalers of the AHL, earning 3 points (2G-1A) in 6 games. After the season, Crombeen announced his retirement from hockey.

== Personal ==
His son, B.J. Crombeen, played 445 NHL games with four teams.

== Career statistics ==
=== Regular season and playoffs ===
			Regular season					Playoffs
Season	Team	League	GP	G	A	Pts	PIM	GP	G	A	Pts	PIM
1972–73	Sarnia Bees	WOHL	—	—	—	—	—	—	—	—	—	—
1973–74	Kingston Canadians	OHA	69	19	29	48	59	—	—	—	—	—
1974–75	Kingston Canadians	OMJHL	69	56	58	114	50	2	0	0	0	0
1975–76	Kingston Canadians	OMJHL	57	43	39	82	65	7	3	4	7	8
1976–77	Kingston Canadians	OMJHL	49	42	36	78	16	10	5	9	14	23
1977–78	Cleveland Barons	NHL	48	3	4	7	13	—	—	—	—	—
1977–78	Binghamton Dusters	AHL	13	1	2	3	4	—	—	—	—	—
1977–78	Salt Lake Golden Eagles	CHL	12	4	4	8	4	—	—	—	—	—
1978–79	St. Louis Blues	NHL	37	3	8	11	34	—	—	—	—	—
1978–79	Salt Lake Golden Eagles	CHL	30	6	9	15	48	—	—	—	—	—
1979–80	St. Louis Blues	NHL	71	10	12	22	20	2	0	0	0	0
1980–81	St. Louis Blues	NHL	66	9	14	23	58	11	3	0	3	8
1981–82	St. Louis Blues	NHL	71	19	8	27	32	10	3	1	4	20
1982–83	St. Louis Blues	NHL	80	6	11	17	20	4	0	1	1	4
1983–84	Hartford Whalers	NHL	56	1	4	5	25	—	—	—	—	—
1984–85	Hartford Whalers	NHL	46	4	7	11	16	—	—	—	—	—
1984–85	Binghamton Whalers	AHL	6	2	1	3	0	—	—	—	—	—
NHL totals			475	55	68	123	218	27	6	2	8	32

== Awards ==
- 1976, 1977: OMJHL Second All-Star Team

Preceded by Bjorn Johansson	Cleveland Barons first-round draft pick 1977	Succeeded by None
Preceded by Bernie Federko	Edmonton Oilers first-round draft pick 1977	Succeeded by Ron Areshenkoff
