= Cal Sandbeck =

American ice hockey player (born 1956)

- Born: January 28, 1956 (age 70) International Falls, Minnesota, U.S.
- Height: 6 ft 1 in (185 cm)
- Weight: 218 lb (99 kg; 15 st 8 lb)
- Position: Defense
- Shot: Left
- Played for: Edmonton Oilers (WHA)
- NHL draft: 79th overall, 1976; California Golden Seals
- WHA draft: 113th overall, 1976; Calgary Cowboys
- Playing career: 1978–1980

Calvin Wayne Sandbeck (born January 28, 1956) is an American former professional ice hockey player who played in the World Hockey Association (WHA). Drafted in the fifth round of the 1976 NHL Amateur Draft by the California Golden Seals, Sandbeck opted to play in the WHA after being selected by the Calgary Cowboys in the tenth round of the 1976 WHA Amateur Draft. He played parts of two WHA seasons for the Edmonton Oilers.

== Career statistics ==
=== Regular season and playoffs ===
			Regular season					Playoffs
Season	Team	League	GP	G	A	Pts	PIM	GP	G	A	Pts	PIM
1974–75	University of Denver	WCHA	35	3	5	8	55	—	—	—	—	—
1975–76	University of Denver	WCHA	Statistics Unavailable
1976–77	University of Denver	WCHA	38	4	9	13	77	—	—	—	—	—
1977–78	University of Denver	WCHA	39	8	24	32	60	—	—	—	—	—
1977–78	Edmonton Oilers	WHA	11	1	2	3	39	5	0	0	0	10
1978–79	Edmonton Oilers	WHA	6	0	0	0	2	—	—	—	—	—
1978–79	Dallas Black Hawks	CHL	60	4	12	16	121	3	0	1	1	4
1979–80	Oklahoma City Stars	CHL	65	5	17	22	128	—	—	—	—	—
WHA totals			17	1	2	3	41	5	0	0	0	10
