= Rich Gosselin =

Canadian ice hockey player

- Born: April 25, 1956 (age 70) St. Pierre, Manitoba, Canada
- Height: 5 ft 8 in (173 cm)
- Weight: 150 lb (68 kg; 10 st 10 lb)
- Position: Centre
- Shot: Right
- Played for: Winnipeg Jets (WHA)
- NHL draft: 118th overall, 1976; Montreal Canadiens
- Playing career: 1976–1990

Richmond "Rich" Gosselin (born April 25, 1956) is a Canadian retired professional ice hockey player who played in the World Hockey Association (WHA) and the Swiss-A League. He was drafted in the seventh round of the 1976 NHL Amateur Draft by the Montreal Canadiens. Gosselin played three games with the Winnipeg Jets during the 1978–79 WHA season, after which he went overseas to play in Switzerland.

Gosselin served as a head coach in various European leagues after his playing career ended. In Manitoba, he has coached the Eastman Midget 'AAA' Selects, South East Prairie Thunder, and Steinbach Pistons junior hockey teams. Gosselin coached the Prairie Thunder to a second-place finish at the 2009 Allan Cup.

== Career statistics ==
=== Regular season and playoffs ===
			Regular season					Playoffs
Season	Team	League	GP	G	A	Pts	PIM	GP	G	A	Pts	PIM
1973–74	Flin Flon Bombers	WCHL	61	11	23	34	56	—	—	—	—	—
1974–75	Flin Flon Bombers	WCHL	70	47	69	116	83	—	—	—	—	—
1975–76	Flin Flon Bombers	WCHL	69	67	66	133	192	—	—	—	—	—
1976–77	Switzerland	Intl	--	23	15	38	0	—	—	—	—	—
1978–79	Switzerland	Intl	--	27	19	46	0	—	—	—	—	—
1978–79	Winnipeg Jets	WHA	3	0	0	0	0	—	—	—	—	—
1979–80	Chaux-de-Fonds HC	Swiss-A	--	24	16	40	0	—	—	—	—	—
1980–81	Biel HC	Swiss-A	--	30	20	50	0	—	—	—	—	—
1981–82	Biel HC	Swiss-A	--	34	26	60	0	—	—	—	—	—
1982–83	Biel HC	Swiss-A	Statistics Unavailable
1985–86	Fribourg-Gotteron HC	Swiss-A	35	26	29	55	0	—	—	—	—	—
WHA totals			3	0	0	0	0	—	—	—	—	—
