= 1976 NHL amateur draft =

1976 North American ice hockey draft

General information
- Date: June 1, 1976
- Location: NHL offices Montreal, Quebec, Canada

Overview
- 135 total selections in 15 rounds
- First selection: (Canada) Rick Green (Washington Capitals)
- Hall of Famers: 1: C Bernie Federko

The 1976 NHL amateur draft was the 14th draft for the National Hockey League. It was held at the NHL office in Montreal, on June 1, 1976. It is notable as featuring one of the weakest first rounds in draft history, as only two players (Rick Green and Bernie Federko) played more than 450 career NHL games. In 2002, Federko was elected into the Hockey Hall of Fame after playing fourteen seasons (1976–1990), with 13 of those with the St. Louis Blues. The Cleveland Barons drafted as the California Golden Seals and the Colorado Rockies took part as the Kansas City Scouts. The two franchises would relocate to their new cities on July 15 of that year.

The last active player in the NHL from this draft class was Kent Nilsson, who played his last NHL game in the 1994–95 season.

== Selections by round ==
Below are listed the selections in the 1976 NHL amateur draft.

= NHL All-Star team ·	= NHL All-Star (Note: Players are identified as an All-Star if they were selected for the All-Star game at any time in their career.) ·	= NHL All-Star and NHL All-Star team ·	= Hall of Famers

Club teams are located in North America unless otherwise noted.

=== Round one ===
#	Player	Nationality	NHL team	College/junior/club team
1	Rick Green (D)	Canada	Washington Capitals	London Knights (OHA)
2	Blair Chapman (RW)	Canada	Pittsburgh Penguins (from Kansas City)^{1}	Saskatoon Blades (WCHL)
3	Glen Sharpley (C)	Canada	Minnesota North Stars	Hull Festivals (QMJHL)
4	Fred Williams (C)	Canada	Detroit Red Wings	Saskatoon Blades (WCHL)
5	Bjorn Johansson (D)	Sweden	California Golden Seals	Örebro IK (Sweden)
6	Don Murdoch (RW)	Canada	New York Rangers	Medicine Hat Tigers (WCHL)
7	Bernie Federko (F)	Canada	St. Louis Blues	Saskatoon Blades (WCHL)
8	David Shand (D)	Canada	Atlanta Flames (from Vancouver)^{2}	Peterborough Petes (OMJHL)
9	Real Cloutier (F)	Canada	Chicago Black Hawks	Quebec Nordiques (WHA)
10	Harold Phillipoff (LW)	Canada	Atlanta Flames	New Westminster Bruins (WCHL)
11	Paul Gardner (C)	Canada	Kansas City Scouts (from Pittsburgh)^{3}	Oshawa Generals (OMJHL)
12	Peter Lee (RW)	Canada	Montreal Canadiens (from Toronto)^{4}	Ottawa 67's (OHA)
13	Rod Schutt (LW)	Canada	Montreal Canadiens (from Los Angeles)^{5}	Sudbury Wolves (OMJHL)
14	Alex McKendry (F)	Canada	New York Islanders	Sudbury Wolves (OMJHL)
15	Greg Carroll (C)	Canada	Washington Capitals (from Buffalo via Atlanta)^{6}	Medicine Hat Tigers (WCHL)
16	Clayton Pachal (C)	Canada	Boston Bruins	New Westminster Bruins (WCHL)
17	Mark Suzor (D)	Canada	Philadelphia Flyers	Kingston Canadians (OMJHL)
18	Bruce Baker (RW)	Canada	Montreal Canadiens	Ottawa 67's (OMJHL)

1. The Kansas City Scouts' first-round pick went to the Pittsburgh Penguins as the result of a trade on January 9, 1976 that sent Chuck Arnason, Steve Durbano and Pittsburgh's first-round pick in 1976 to Kansas City in exchange for Ed Gilbert, Simon Nolet and this pick.
2. The Vancouver Canucks' first-round pick went to the Atlanta Flames as the result of a trade on January 20, 1976 that sent Curt Ridley to Vancouver in exchange for this pick.
3. The Pittsburgh Penguins' first-round pick went to the Kansas City Scouts as the result of a trade on January 9, 1976 that sent Ed Gilbert, Simon Nolet and Kansas City's first-round pick in 1976 to Pittsburgh in exchange for Chuck Arnason, Steve Durbano and this pick.
4. The Toronto Maple Leafs' first-round pick went to the Montreal Canadiens as the result of a trade on June 17, 1975 that sent Wayne Thomas to Toronto in exchange for this pick.
5. The Los Angeles Kings' first-round pick went to the Montreal Canadiens as the result of a trade on August 22, 1972 that sent Terry Harper to Los Angeles in exchange for Los Angeles' second-round pick in 1974, third-round pick in 1975 and this pick.
6. The Buffalo Sabres' first-round pick went to the Washington Capitals as the result of a trade on January 22, 1976 that sent Bill Clement to Atlanta in exchange for Jean Lemieux, Gerry Meehan and this pick.
  Atlanta previously acquired this pick as the result of a trade on October 1, 1975 that sent Jacques Richard to Buffalo in exchange for Larry Carriere and this pick.

=== Round two ===
#	Player	Nationality	NHL team	College/junior/club team
19	Greg Malone (C)	Canada	Pittsburgh Penguins (from Washington)^{1}	Oshawa Generals (OMJHL)
20	Brian Sutter (LW)	Canada	St. Louis Blues (from Kansas City)^{2}	Lethbridge Broncos (WCHL)
21	Steve Clippingdale (LW)	Canada	Los Angeles Kings (from Minnesota)^{3}	New Westminster Bruins (WCHL)
22	Reed Larson (D)	United States	Detroit Red Wings	University of Minnesota (WCHA)
23	Vern Stenlund (C)	Canada	California Golden Seals	London Knights (OMJHL)
24	Dave Farrish (D)	Canada	New York Rangers	Sudbury Wolves (OMJHL)
25	John Smrke (LW)	Canada	St. Louis Blues	Toronto Marlboros (OMJHL)
26	Bob Manno (D)	Canada	Vancouver Canucks	St. Catharines Black Hawks (OMJHL)
27	Jeff McDill (RW)	Canada	Chicago Black Hawks	Victoria Cougars (WCHL)
28	Bobby Simpson (LW)	Canada	Atlanta Flames	Sherbrooke Castors (QMJHL)
29	Peter Marsh (RW)	Canada	Pittsburgh Penguins	Sherbrooke Castors (QMJHL)
30	Randy Carlyle (D)	Canada	Toronto Maple Leafs	Sudbury Wolves (OMJHL)
31	Jim Roberts (LW)	Canada	Minnesota North Stars (from Los Angeles via Detroit)^{4}	Ottawa 67's (OMJHL)
32	Mike Kaszycki (C)	Canada	New York Islanders	Sault Ste. Marie Greyhounds (OMJHL)
33	Joe Kowal (LW)	Canada	Buffalo Sabres	Hamilton Fincups (OMJHL)
34	Lorry Gloeckner (D)	Canada	Boston Bruins	Victoria Cougars (WCHL)
35	Drew Callander (C)	Canada	Philadelphia Flyers	Regina Pats (WCHL)
36	Barry Melrose (D)	Canada	Montreal Canadiens	Kamloops Chiefs (WCHL)

1. The Washington Capitals' second-round pick went to the Pittsburgh Penguins as the result of a trade on November 26, 1975 that sent Bob Paradise to Washington in exchange for this pick.
2. The Kansas City Scouts' second-round pick went to the St. Louis Blues as the result of a trade on June 18, 1975 that sent Denis Dupere, Craig Patrick and cash to Kansas City in exchange for Lynn Powis and this pick.
3. The Minnesota North Stars' second-round pick went to the Los Angeles Kings as the result of a trade on August 15, 1975 that sent Tim Young to Minnesota in exchange for this pick.
4. The Detroit Red Wings' second-round pick went to the Minnesota North Stars as the result of a trade on February 27, 1976 that sent Dennis Hextall to Detroit in exchange for Bill Hogaboam and this pick.
  Detroit previously acquired this pick as the result of a trade on June 23, 1975 that sent Bart Crashley and Marcel Dionne to Los Angeles in exchange for Terry Harper, Dan Maloney and this pick.

=== Round three ===
#	Player	Nationality	NHL team	College/junior/club team
37	Tom Rowe (RW)	United States	Washington Capitals	London Knights (OMJHL)
38	Mike Kitchen (D)	Canada	Kansas City Scouts	Toronto Marlboros (OMJHL)
39	Don Jackson (D)	United States	Minnesota North Stars	University of Notre Dame (WCHA)
40	Fred Berry (C)	Canada	Detroit Red Wings	New Westminster Bruins (WCHL)
41	Mike Fidler (LW)	United States	California Golden Seals	Boston University (ECAC)
42	Mike McEwen (D)	Canada	New York Rangers	Toronto Marlboros (OMJHL)
43	Jim Kirkpatrick (D)	Canada	St. Louis Blues	Toronto Marlboros (OMJHL)
44	Rob Flockhart (LW)	Canada	Vancouver Canucks	Kamloops Chiefs (WCHL)
45	Thomas Gradin (C)	Sweden	Chicago Black Hawks	Ornskoldsvik (Sweden)
46	Rick Hodgson (D)	Canada	Atlanta Flames	Calgary Centennials (WCHL)
47	Morris Lukowich (LW)	Canada	Pittsburgh Penguins	Medicine Hat Tigers (WCHL)
48	Alain Belanger (RW)	Canada	Toronto Maple Leafs	Sherbrooke Castors (QMJHL)
49	Don Moores (C)	Canada	Los Angeles Kings	Kamloops Chiefs (WCHL)
50	Garth MacGuigan (C)	Canada	New York Islanders	Montreal Juniors (QMJHL)
51	Ron Zanussi (RW)	Canada	Minnesota North Stars (from Buffalo)^{1}	London Knights (OMJHL)
52	Gary McFayden (RW)	Canada	Toronto Maple Leafs (from Boston)^{2}	Hull Festivals (QMJHL)
53	Craig Hanmer (D)	United States	Philadelphia Flyers	Mohawk Valley Comets (NAJHL)
54	Bill Baker (D)	United States	Montreal Canadiens	University of Minnesota (WCHA)

1. The Buffalo Sabres' third-round pick went to the Minnesota North Stars as the result of a trade on January 27, 1975 that sent Fred Stanfield to Buffalo in exchange for Norm Gratton and this pick.
2. The Boston Bruins' third-round pick went to the Toronto Maple Leafs as the result of a trade on June 3, 1975 that sent Toronto's fourth-round pick in 1975 to Boston in exchange for this pick.

=== Round four ===
#	Player	Nationality	NHL team	College/junior/club team
55	Al Glendinning (D)	Canada	Washington Capitals	Calgary Centennials (WCHL)
56	Mike Liut (G)	Canada	St. Louis Blues (from Kansas City)^{1}	Bowling Green University (CCHA)
57	Mike Fedorko (D)	Canada	Minnesota North Stars	Hamilton Fincups (OMJHL)
58	Kevin Schamehorn (RW)	Canada	Detroit Red Wings	New Westminster Bruins (WCHL)
59	Warren Young (C)	Canada	California Golden Seals	Michigan Technological University (WCHA)
60	Claude Periard (LW)	Canada	New York Rangers	Trois-Rivières Draveurs (QMJHL)
61	Paul Skidmore (G)	United States	St. Louis Blues	Boston College (ECAC)
62	Elmer Ray (LW)	Canada	Vancouver Canucks	Calgary Centennials (WCHL)
63	Dave Debol (C)	United States	Chicago Black Hawks	University of Michigan (WCHA)
64	Kent Nilsson (RW)	Sweden	Atlanta Flames	Djurgårdens IF (Sweden)
65	Greg Redquest (G)	Canada	Pittsburgh Penguins	Oshawa Generals (OMJHL)
66	Tim Williams (D)	Canada	Toronto Maple Leafs	Victoria Cougars (WCHL)
67	Bob Mears (G)	Canada	Los Angeles Kings	Kingston Canadians (OMJHL)
68	Ken Morrow (D)	United States	New York Islanders	Bowling Green University (CCHA)
69	Rocky Maze (LW)	Canada	Buffalo Sabres	Edmonton Oil Kings (WCHL)
70	Bob Miller (C)	United States	Boston Bruins	Ottawa 67's (OMJHL)
71	Dave Hynek (LW)	Canada	Philadelphia Flyers	Kingston Canadians (OMJHL)
72	Ed Clarey (RW)	Canada	Montreal Canadiens	Cornwall Royals (QMJHL)

1. The Kansas City Scouts' fourth-round pick went to the St. Louis Blues as the result of a trade on October 29, 1974 that sent Larry Giroux to Kansas City in exchange for Chris Evans and this pick.

=== Round five ===
#	Player	Nationality	NHL team	College/junior/club team
73	Doug Patey (RW)	Canada	Washington Capitals	Sault Ste. Marie Greyhounds (OMJHL)
74	Rick McIntyre (LW)	Canada	Kansas City Scouts	Oshawa Generals (OMJHL)
75	Phil Verchota (LW)	United States	Minnesota North Stars	University of Minnesota (WCHA)
76	Dwight Schofield (D)	United States	Detroit Red Wings	London Knights (OMJHL)
77	Darcy Regier (D)	Canada	California Golden Seals	Lethbridge Broncos (WCHL)
78	Doug Caines (C)	Canada	New York Rangers	St. Catharines Black Hawks (OMJHL)
79	Cal Sandbeck (D)	United States	California Golden Seals (from St. Louis)^{1}	University of Denver (WCHA)
80	Rick Durston (LW)	Canada	Vancouver Canucks	Victoria Cougars (WCHL)
81	Terry McDonald (C)	Canada	Chicago Black Hawks	Edmonton Oil Kings (WCHL)
82	Mark Earp (G)	Canada	Atlanta Flames	Kamloops Chiefs (WCHL)
83	Brendan Lowe (D)	Canada	Pittsburgh Penguins	Sherbrooke Castors (QMJHL)
84	Greg Hotham (D)	Canada	Toronto Maple Leafs	Kingston Canadians (OMJHL)
85	Rob Palmer (D)	Canada	Los Angeles Kings	University of Michigan (WCHA)
86	Mike Hordy (D)	Canada	New York Islanders	Sault Ste. Marie Greyhounds (OMJHL)
87	Ron Roscoe (D)	Canada	Buffalo Sabres	Hamilton Fincups (OMJHL)
88	Peter Vandemark (LW)	Canada	Boston Bruins	Oshawa Generals (OMJHL)
89	Robin Lang (G)	Canada	Philadelphia Flyers	Cornell University (ECAC)
90	Maurice Barrette (G)	Canada	Montreal Canadiens	Quebec Remparts (QMJHL)

1. The St. Louis Blues' fifth-round pick went to the California Golden Seals as the result of a trade on March 9, 1976 that sent Dave Hrechkosy to St. Louis in exchange for a third-round pick in 1977 and this pick.

=== Round six ===
#	Player	Nationality	NHL team	College/junior/club team
91	Jim Bedard (G)	Canada	Washington Capitals	Sudbury Wolves (OMJHL)
92	Larry Skinner (C)	Canada	Kansas City Scouts	Ottawa 67's (OMJHL)
93	Dave Delich (C)	United States	Minnesota North Stars	Colorado College (WCHA)
94	Tony Horvath (D)	Canada	Detroit Red Wings	Sault Ste. Marie Greyhounds (OMJHL)
95	Jouni Rinne (RW)	Finland	California Golden Seals	Rauma (Finland)
96	Barry Scully (RW)	Canada	New York Rangers	Kingston Canadians (OMJHL)
97	Nels Goddard (D)	Canada	St. Louis Blues	Michigan Technological University (WCHA)
98	Rob Tudor (RW)	Canada	Vancouver Canucks	Regina Pats (WCHL)
99	John Peterson (G)	Canada	Chicago Black Hawks	University of Notre Dame (WCHA)
100	Don Wilson (D)	Canada	Washington Capitals	St. Catharines Black Hawks (OMJHL)
101	Vic Sirko (D)	Canada	Pittsburgh Penguins	Oshawa Generals (OMJHL)
102	Dan Djakalovic (C)	Canada	Toronto Maple Leafs	Kitchener Rangers (OMJHL)
103	Larry McRae (G)	Canada	Los Angeles Kings	Windsor Spitfires (OMJHL)
104	Yvon Vautour (RW)	Canada	New York Islanders	Laval National (QMJHL)
105	Don Lemieux (D)	Canada	Buffalo Sabres	Trois-Rivières Draveurs (QMJHL)
106	Ted Olson (LW)	Canada	Boston Bruins	Calgary Centennials (WCHL)
107	Paul Klasinski (LW)	United States	Philadelphia Flyers	St. Paul Vulcans (MWJHL)
108	Pierre Brassard (LW)	Canada	Montreal Canadiens	Cornwall Royals (QMJHL)

=== Round seven ===
#	Player	Nationality	NHL team	College/junior/club team
109	Dale Rideout (G)	Canada	Washington Capitals	Flin Flon Bombers (WCHL)
110	Jeff Barr (D)	United States	Minnesota North Stars	Michigan State University (WCHA)
111	Fern LeBlanc (C)	Canada	Detroit Red Wings	Sherbrooke Castors (QMJHL)
112	Remi Levesque (C)	Canada	New York Rangers	Quebec Remparts (QMJHL)
113	Mike Eaves (C)	Canada/ United States	St. Louis Blues	University of Wisconsin (WCHA)
114	Brad Rhiness (C)	Canada	Vancouver Canucks	Kingston Canadians (OMJHL)
115	John Rothstein (RW)	United States	Chicago Black Hawks	University of Minnesota Duluth (WCHA)
116	Charlie Skjodt (C)	Canada	Toronto Maple Leafs	Windsor Spitfires (OMJHL)
117	Sammy Bains (LW)	Canada	Philadelphia Flyers	Austin Mavericks (MWJHL)
118	Rich Gosselin (C)	Canada	Montreal Canadiens	Flin Flon Bombers (WCHL)

=== Round eight ===
#	Player	Nationality	NHL team	College/junior/club team
119	Al Dumba (RW)	Canada	Washington Capitals	Regina Pats (WCHL)
120	Claude Legris (G)	Canada	Detroit Red Wings	Sorel Eperviers (QMJHL)
121	Jacques Soguel (C)	Switzerland	St. Louis Blues	Davos (Switzerland)
122	Stuart Ostlund (C)	Canada	Vancouver Canucks	Michigan Technological University (WCHA)
123	John Gregory (D)	Canada	Montreal Canadiens	University of Wisconsin (WCHA)

=== Round nine ===
#	Player	Nationality	NHL team	College/junior/club team
124	Dave Dornseif (D)	United States	St. Louis Blues	Providence College (ECAC)
125	Bruce Horsch (G)	United States	Montreal Canadiens	Michigan Technological University (WCHA)

=== Round ten ===
#	Player	Nationality	NHL team	College/junior/club team
126	Brad Wilson (C)	United States	St. Louis Blues	Providence College (ECAC)
127	John Tavella (LW)	Canada	Montreal Canadiens	Sault Ste. Marie Greyhounds (OMJHL)

=== Round eleven ===
#	Player	Nationality	NHL team	College/junior/club team
128	Dan Hoene (RW)	United States	St. Louis Blues	University of Michigan (WCHA)
129	Mark Davidson (LW)	Canada	Montreal Canadiens	Flin Flon Bombers (WCHL)

=== Round twelve ===
#	Player	Nationality	NHL team	College/junior/club team
130	Goran Lindblom (D)	Sweden	St. Louis Blues	Skelleftea (Sweden)
131	Bill Wells (LW)	Canada	Montreal Canadiens	Cornwall Royals (QMJHL)

=== Round thirteen ===
#	Player	Nationality	NHL team	College/junior/club team
132	Jim Bales (G)	Canada	St. Louis Blues	University of Denver (WCHA)
133	Ron Wilson (LW)	Canada	Montreal Canadiens	St. Catharines Black Hawks (OMJHL)

=== Round fourteen ===
#	Player	Nationality	NHL team	College/junior/club team
134	Anders Hakansson (LW)	Sweden	St. Louis Blues	Solna (Sweden)

=== Round fifteen ===
#	Player	Nationality	NHL team	College/junior/club team
135	Juhani Wallenius (C)	Finland	St. Louis Blues	Rauma (Finland)

= NHL All-Star team ·	= NHL All-Star ·	= NHL All-Star and NHL All-Star team ·	= Hall of Famers

== Draftees based on nationality ==
Rank	Country	Amount
	North America	127
1	Canada	104
2	United States	23
	Europe	8
3	Sweden	5
4	Finland	2
5	Switzerland	1

== See also ==
- 1976–77 NHL season
- 1976 WHA amateur draft
- List of NHL players
