= 1976 World Junior Ice Hockey Championships =

1976 IIHF World Junior Championship
Tournament details
- Host country: Finland
- Venue(s): 4 (in 4 host cities)
- Dates: December 26, 1975 – January 1, 1976
- Teams: 5

Final positions
- Champions: Soviet Union
- Runner-up: Canada
- Third place: Czechoslovakia
- Fourth place: Finland

Tournament statistics
- Games played: 10
- Goals scored: 78 (7.8 per game)
- Scoring leader(s): (Soviet Union) Valeri Evstifeev (8 points)

The 1976 World Junior Ice Hockey Championships were between December 26, 1975, and January 1, 1976, in Tampere, Turku, Pori and Rauma Finland. The Soviet team won the tournament with a perfect 4–0 record. This was the third edition of the Ice Hockey World Junior Championship, but the results are not included in official IIHF records. Canada was represented by a club team, the Sherbrooke Castors, while the other four nations were represented by teams of their top under-20 players. The United States did not participate in this tournament, after having competed in the 1974 and 1975 tournaments.

== Final standings ==
The tournament was a round-robin format, with each team playing each of the other four teams once each.

| Pos | Team | Pld | W | L | D | GF | GA | GD | Pts |
|---|---|---|---|---|---|---|---|---|---|
| 1 | Soviet Union | 4 | 4 | 0 | 0 | 19 | 10 | +9 | 8 |
| 2 | Canada | 4 | 2 | 2 | 0 | 12 | 27 | −15 | 4 |
| 3 | Czechoslovakia | 4 | 2 | 2 | 0 | 12 | 10 | +2 | 4 |
| 4 | Finland | 4 | 1 | 3 | 0 | 12 | 14 | −2 | 2 |
| 5 | Sweden | 4 | 1 | 3 | 0 | 23 | 17 | +6 | 2 |

Source: Hockey Canada

== Results ==
| Finland | 1 – 4 (1–1, 0–2, 0–1) | Canada |

| Soviet Union | 3 – 2 (0–2, 2–0, 1–0) | Czechoslovakia |

| Sweden | 17 – 1 (3–1, 9–0, 5–0) | Canada |

| Sweden | 2 – 5 (2–2, 0–2, 0–1) | Soviet Union |

| Finland | 0 – 2 (0–1, 0–0, 0–1) | Czechoslovakia |

| Finland | 4 – 6 (0–4, 0–0, 4–2) | Soviet Union |

| Canada | 5 – 4 (0–1, 1–2, 4–1) | Czechoslovakia |

| Czechoslovakia | 4 – 2 (3–0, 0–2, 1–0) | Sweden |

| Finland | 7 – 2 (2–0, 1–2, 4–0) | Sweden |

| Soviet Union | 5 – 2 (1–0, 1–0, 3–2) | Canada |

== Scoring leaders ==
| Rank | Player | Country | G | A | Pts |
|---|---|---|---|---|---|
| 1 | Valeri Evstifeev | Soviet Union | 4 | 4 | 8 |
| 2 | Karel Holý | Czechoslovakia | 5 | 2 | 7 |
| 3 | Valeri Bragin | Soviet Union | 4 | 2 | 6 |
| 4 | Sergei Prdgortsev | Soviet Union | 2 | 4 | 6 |
| 5 | Matti Forss | Finland | 4 | 1 | 5 |
| 6 | Björn Johansson | Sweden | 3 | 2 | 5 |
| 7 | Josef Lukác | Czechoslovakia | 2 | 3 | 5 |
| 8 | Peter Marsh | Canada | 4 | 0 | 4 |
| 9 | Thomas Gradin | Sweden | 3 | 1 | 4 |
| 9 | Hannu Helander | Finland | 3 | 1 | 4 |
| 9 | Anders Håkansson | Sweden | 3 | 1 | 4 |

== Tournament awards ==
| | Best Players | All-Star Team |
|---|---|---|
| Goaltender | (Soviet Union) Sergei Babariko | (Czechoslovakia) Pavol Švárny |
| Defencemen | (Soviet Union) Vasili Pervukhin | (Soviet Union) Vassili Pervukhin (Sweden) Björn Johansson |
| Forwards | (Soviet Union) Valeri Evstifeev | (Canada) Peter Marsh (Czechoslovakia) Karel Holý (Soviet Union) Valeri Evstifeev |
