= 1975–76 WCHL season =

Junior ice hockey season

- League: Western Hockey League
- Sport: Ice hockey
- Teams: 12

Regular season
- Season champions: New Westminster Bruins (1)
- Season MVP: Bernie Federko (Saskatoon Blades)
- Top scorer: Bernie Federko (Saskatoon Blades)

Playoffs
- Finals champions: New Westminster Bruins (2)
- Runners-up: Saskatoon Blades

WHL seasons
- 1974–75 1976–77

1975–76 CHL season
- League: Canadian Hockey League
- Sport: Ice hockey
- Teams: 34

OMJHL

QMJHL

WCHL

Memorial Cup
- Finals champions: Hamilton Fincups (OMJHL) (1st title)
- Runners-up: New Westminster Bruins (WCHL)

The 1975–76 WCHL season was the tenth season of the Western Canada Hockey League (WCHL), featuring twelve teams and an expanded 72-game regular season. The New Westminster Bruins topped the regular season standings with 54 wins, and in the playoffs won their second consecutive President's Cup, defeating the Saskatoon Blades in a rematch of the previous season's final. The Bruins advanced to the 1976 Memorial Cup tournament, losing the final to the Hamilton Fincups.

== Regular season ==
=== Final standings ===
East Division
Pos	Team	Pld	W	L	T	GF	GA	Pts
1	x – Saskatoon Blades	72	43	19	10	390	269	96
2	x – Brandon Wheat Kings	72	34	30	8	341	303	76
3	x – Lethbridge Broncos	72	28	35	9	293	352	65
4	x – Winnipeg Clubs	72	27	39	6	302	378	60
5	x – Regina Pats	72	22	42	8	278	347	52
6	Flin Flon Bombers	72	18	44	10	279	441	46

x – qualified for playoffs

West Division
Pos	Team	Pld	W	L	T	GF	GA	Pts
1	x – New Westminster Bruins	72	54	14	4	463	247	112
2	x – Kamloops Chiefs	72	40	26	6	365	285	86
3	x – Medicine Hat Tigers	72	38	24	10	379	306	86
4	x – Victoria Cougars	72	37	28	7	343	320	81
5	x – Edmonton Oil Kings	72	25	42	5	312	400	55
6	Calgary Centennials	72	22	45	5	284	381	49

x – qualified for playoffs

=== Scoring leaders ===
Note: GP = Games played; G = Goals; A = Assists; Pts = Points; PIM = Penalties in minutes

Player	Team	GP	G	A	Pts	PIM
Bernie Federko	Saskatoon Blades	72	72	115	187	108
Greg Carroll	Medicine Hat Tigers	71	60	109	169	118
Don Murdoch	Medicine Hat Tigers	70	88	77	165	202
Blair Chapman	Saskatoon Blades	69	71	86	157	67
Fred Berry	New Westminster Bruins	72	59	87	146	164
Rick Shinske	New Westminster Bruins	70	52	91	143	86
Jim Gustafson	Victoria Cougars	69	46	95	141	72
Morris Lukowich	Medicine Hat Tigers	72	65	75	140	195
Rich Gosselin	Flin Flon Bombers	69	67	66	133	192
Dale McMullin	Brandon Wheat Kings	72	56	74	130	28

== 1976 WCHL Playoffs ==
=== Preliminary round ===
- Medicine Hat defeated Edmonton 4 games to 1
- Victoria defeated Regina 4 games to 1 with 1 tied

=== League quarter-finals ===
- New Westminster defeated Brandon 5 games to 0
- Saskatoon defeated Lethbridge 3 games to 1 with 2 tied
- Kamloops defeated Winnipeg 3 games to 1 with 2 tied
- Victoria defeated Medicine Hat 3 games to 1 with 1 tied

=== League semi-finals ===
- Saskatoon defeated Kamloops 4 games to 2
- New Westminster defeated Victoria 4 games to 0 with 1 tied

=== WHL Championship ===
- New Westminster defeated Saskatoon 4 games to 2 with 1 tied

== All-Star game ==
On January 15, the West All-Stars defeated the East All-Stars 8–7 at Lethbridge, Alberta in front of a crowd of 2,413.

== WHL awards ==
Most Valuable Player: Bernie Federko, Saskatoon Blades
Top Scorer: Bernie Federko, Saskatoon Blades
Most Sportsmanlike Player: Blair Chapman, Saskatoon Blades
Top Defenseman: Kevin McCarthy, Winnipeg Clubs
Rookie of the Year: Steve Tambellini, Lethbridge Broncos
Top Goaltender: Carey Walker, New Westminster Bruins
Coach of the Year: Ernie McLean, New Westminster Bruins
Regular season champions: New Westminster Bruins

== All-Star teams ==
	First Team		Second Team	
Goal	Glen Hanlon	Brandon Wheat Kings	Dave Parro	Saskatoon Blades
Defense	Kevin McCarthy	Winnipeg Clubs	Brad Maxwell	New Westminster Bruins
Defense	Barry Beck	New Westminster Bruins	Tim Williams	Victoria Cougars
Center	Bernie Federko	Saskatoon Blades	Greg Carroll	Medicine Hat Tigers
Left Wing	Morris Lukowich	Medicine Hat Tigers	Steve Clippingdale	New Westminster Bruins
Right Wing	Don Murdoch	Medicine Hat Tigers	Blair Chapman	Saskatoon Blades

== See also ==
- 1976 NHL entry draft
- 1975 in sports
- 1976 in sports

Preceded by 1974–75 WCHL season	WHL seasons	Succeeded by 1976–77 WCHL season
