= 1976–77 CHL season =

American ice hockey season

The 1976–77 CHL season was the 14th season of the Central Hockey League, a North American minor professional league. Six teams participated in the regular season, and the Kansas City Blues won the league title.

== Regular season ==
Central Hockey League	GP	W	L	OTL	GF	GA	Pts
Kansas City Blues (STL/DET)	76	46	21	9	322	225	101
Dallas Black Hawks (CHI/TOR)	76	35	25	16	281	231	86
Tulsa Oilers (VAN/ATL)	76	37	29	10	314	289	84
Fort Worth Texans (NYI/LA)	76	35	32	9	272	261	79
Salt Lake Golden Eagles (CLE)	76	31	39	6	276	288	68
Oklahoma City Blazers (COL)	76	15	53	8	245	416	38

== Playoffs ==
Semifinals
1	Kansas City Blues	4
4	Fort Worth Texans	2
2	Dallas Black Hawks	1
3	Tulsa Oilers	4

Final
1	Kansas City Blues	4
3	Tulsa Oilers	0
