= List of St. Louis Blues draft picks =

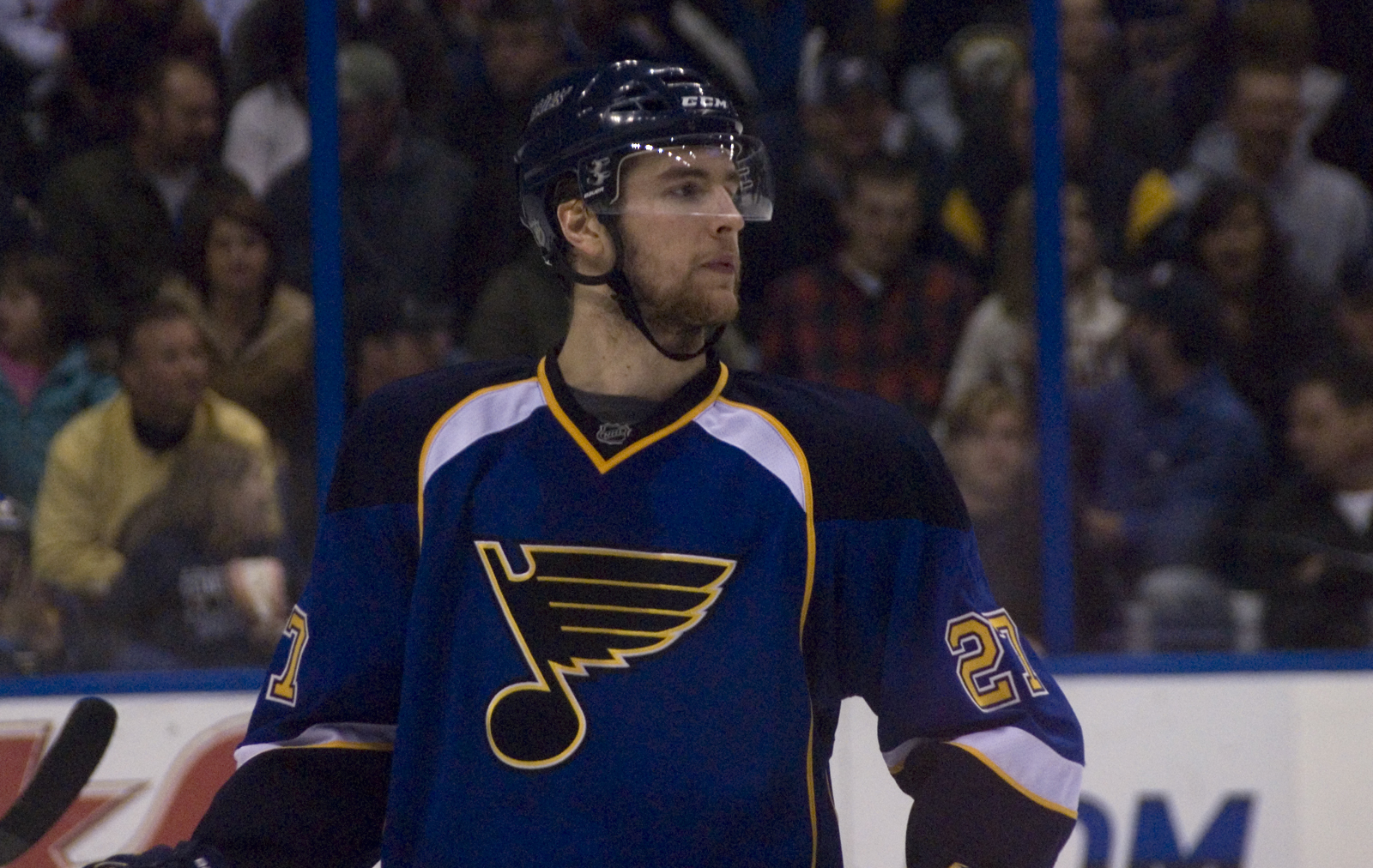
The Blues selected Alex Pietrangelo 4th overall in the 2008 NHL entry draft.

This is a complete list of ice hockey players who were drafted in the National Hockey League Entry Draft by the St. Louis Blues franchise. It includes every player who was drafted, regardless of whether they played for the team.

== Key ==
Played at least one game with the Blues
Spent entire NHL career with the Blues

General terms and abbreviations
| Term or abbreviation | Definition |
|---|---|
| Draft | The year that the player was selected |
| Round | The round of the draft in which the player was selected |
| Pick | The overall position in the draft at which the player was selected |
| S | Supplemental draft selection |

Position abbreviations
| Abbreviation | Definition |
|---|---|
| G | Goaltender |
| D | Defense |
| LW | Left Wing |
| C | Center |
| RW | Right Wing |
| F | Forward |

Abbreviations for statistical columns
| Abbreviation | Definition |
|---|---|
| Pos | Position |
| GP | Games played |
| G | Goals |
| A | Assists |
| Pts | Points |
| PIM | Penalties in minutes |
| W | Wins |
| L | Losses |
| T | Ties |
| OT | Overtime/shootout losses |
| GAA | Goals against average |
| — | Does not apply |

== Draft picks ==
Statistics are complete through the 2025–26 NHL season and show each player's career regular season totals in the NHL. Wins, losses, ties, overtime losses and goals against average apply to goaltenders and are used only for players at that position.

| Draft | Round | Pick | Player | Nationality | Pos | GP | G | A | Pts | PIM | W | L | T | OT | GAA |
|---|---|---|---|---|---|---|---|---|---|---|---|---|---|---|---|
| 1968 | 1 | 6 | Gary Edwards | Canada | G | 286 | 0 | 7 | 7 | 48 | 88 | 125 | 51 | — | 3.65 |
| 1968 | 2 | 16 | Curt Bennett | United States | W | 580 | 152 | 182 | 334 | 347 | — | — | — | — | — |
| 1969 | 2 | 19 | Mike Lowe | Canada | LW | — | — | — | — | — | — | — | — | — | — |
| 1969 | 3 | 30 | Bernie Gagnon | Canada | C | — | — | — | — | — | — | — | — | — | — |
| 1969 | 4 | 42 | Vic Teal | Canada | RW | 1 | 0 | 0 | 0 | 0 | — | — | — | — | — |
| 1969 | 5 | 54 | Brian Glenwright | Canada | LW | — | — | — | — | — | — | — | — | — | — |
| 1969 | 6 | 66 | Tommi Salmelainen | Finland | F | — | — | — | — | — | — | — | — | — | — |
| 1969 | 6 | 70 | Dale Yutsyk | Canada | LW | — | — | — | — | — | — | — | — | — | — |
| 1969 | 7 | 73 | Bob Collyard | United States | C | 10 | 1 | 3 | 4 | 4 | — | — | — | — | — |
| 1969 | 7 | 77 | David Pulkkinen | Canada | C | 2 | 0 | 0 | 0 | 0 | — | — | — | — | — |
| 1969 | 8 | 80 | Pat Lange | Canada | G | — | — | — | — | — | — | — | — | — | — |
| 1969 | 9 | 82 | John Converse | Canada | F | — | — | — | — | — | — | — | — | — | — |
| 1970 | 2 | 23 | Murray Keogan | Canada | F | — | — | — | — | — | — | — | — | — | — |
| 1970 | 3 | 37 | Ron Climie | Canada | LW | — | — | — | — | — | — | — | — | — | — |
| 1970 | 4 | 51 | Gord Brooks | Canada | RW | 70 | 7 | 18 | 25 | 37 | — | — | — | — | — |
| 1970 | 5 | 65 | Mike Stevens | Canada | D | — | — | — | — | — | — | — | — | — | — |
| 1970 | 6 | 79 | Claude Moreau | Canada | D | — | — | — | — | — | — | — | — | — | — |
| 1970 | 7 | 85 | Jack Taggart | Canada | D | — | — | — | — | — | — | — | — | — | — |
| 1970 | 7 | 92 | Terry Marshall | Canada | D | — | — | — | — | — | — | — | — | — | — |
| 1970 | 8 | 104 | Dave Tataryn | Canada | G | 2 | 0 | 0 | 0 | 0 | 1 | 1 | 0 | — | 7.50 |
| 1970 | 9 | 108 | Bob Winograd | Canada | D | — | — | — | — | — | — | — | — | — | — |
| 1970 | 9 | 111 | Mike Lampman | United States | LW | 96 | 17 | 20 | 37 | 34 | — | — | — | — | — |
| 1970 | 10 | 112 | Jeff Rotsch | United States | D | — | — | — | — | — | — | — | — | — | — |
| 1970 | 11 | 113 | Al Calver | Canada | D | — | — | — | — | — | — | — | — | — | — |
| 1970 | 12 | 114 | Gerry MacDonald | Canada | D | — | — | — | — | — | — | — | — | — | — |
| 1970 | 13 | 115 | Gerald Haines | Canada | F | — | — | — | — | — | — | — | — | — | — |
| 1971 | 1 | 4 | Gene Carr | Canada | C | 465 | 79 | 136 | 215 | 365 | — | — | — | — | — |
| 1971 | 3 | 38 | John Garrett | Canada | G | 207 | 0 | 6 | 6 | 41 | 68 | 91 | 37 | — | 4.27 |
| 1971 | 4 | 52 | Derek Harker | Canada | F | — | — | — | — | — | — | — | — | — | — |
| 1971 | 5 | 66 | Wayne Gibbs | Canada | D | — | — | — | — | — | — | — | — | — | — |
| 1971 | 6 | 80 | Bernie Doan | Canada | D | — | — | — | — | — | — | — | — | — | — |
| 1971 | 7 | 94 | Dave Smith | Canada | D | — | — | — | — | — | — | — | — | — | — |
| 1971 | 8 | 108 | Jim Collins | Canada | LW | — | — | — | — | — | — | — | — | — | — |
| 1972 | 1 | 9 | Wayne Merrick | Canada | C | 774 | 191 | 265 | 456 | 303 | — | — | — | — | — |
| 1972 | 3 | 41 | Jean Hamel | Canada | D | 699 | 26 | 95 | 121 | 766 | — | — | — | — | — |
| 1972 | 4 | 57 | Murray Myers | Canada | RW | — | — | — | — | — | — | — | — | — | — |
| 1972 | 5 | 73 | Dave Johnson | Canada | LW | — | — | — | — | — | — | — | — | — | — |
| 1972 | 6 | 89 | Tom Simpson | Canada | RW | — | — | — | — | — | — | — | — | — | — |
| 1972 | 7 | 105 | Brian Coughlin | Canada | D | — | — | — | — | — | — | — | — | — | — |
| 1972 | 8 | 121 | Gary Winchester | Canada | F | — | — | — | — | — | — | — | — | — | — |
| 1973 | 1 | 5 | John Davidson | Canada | G | 301 | 0 | 7 | 7 | 60 | 123 | 124 | 39 | — | 3.52 |
| 1973 | 2 | 24 | George Pesut | Canada | D | 92 | 3 | 22 | 25 | 130 | — | — | — | — | — |
| 1973 | 3 | 48 | Bob Gassoff | Canada | D | 245 | 11 | 47 | 58 | 866 | — | — | — | — | — |
| 1973 | 5 | 72 | Bill Laing | Canada | C | — | — | — | — | — | — | — | — | — | — |
| 1973 | 6 | 88 | Randy Smith | Canada | LW | — | — | — | — | — | — | — | — | — | — |
| 1973 | 7 | 104 | John Wensink | Canada | LW | 403 | 70 | 68 | 138 | 840 | — | — | — | — | — |
| 1973 | 8 | 120 | Jean Tetreault | Canada | LW | — | — | — | — | — | — | — | — | — | — |
| 1974 | 2 | 26 | Bob Hess | Canada | D | 329 | 27 | 95 | 122 | 178 | — | — | — | — | — |
| 1974 | 3 | 43 | Gordon Buynak | United States | D | 4 | 0 | 0 | 0 | 2 | — | — | — | — | — |
| 1974 | 5 | 79 | Mike Zuke | Canada | C | 455 | 86 | 196 | 282 | 220 | — | — | — | — | — |
| 1974 | 5 | 87 | Don Wheldon | United States | D | 2 | 0 | 0 | 0 | 0 | — | — | — | — | — |
| 1974 | 6 | 97 | Mike Thompson | Canada | D | — | — | — | — | — | — | — | — | — | — |
| 1974 | 7 | 115 | Terry Casey | Canada | RW | — | — | — | — | — | — | — | — | — | — |
| 1974 | 8 | 132 | Rod Tordoff | Canada | D | — | — | — | — | — | — | — | — | — | — |
| 1974 | 9 | 149 | Paul Touzin | Canada | G | — | — | — | — | — | — | — | — | — | — |
| 1974 | 10 | 165 | Jack Ahern | United States | D | — | — | — | — | — | — | — | — | — | — |
| 1974 | 11 | 180 | Mitch Babin | Canada | C | 8 | 0 | 0 | 0 | 0 | — | — | — | — | — |
| 1974 | 12 | 194 | Doug Allan | Canada | G | — | — | — | — | — | — | — | — | — | — |
| 1975 | 2 | 27 | Ed Staniowski | Canada | G | 219 | 0 | 10 | 10 | 10 | 67 | 104 | 21 | — | 4.06 |
| 1975 | 2 | 36 | Jamie Masters | Canada | D | 33 | 1 | 13 | 14 | 2 | — | — | — | — | — |
| 1975 | 4 | 63 | Rick Bourbonnais | Canada | RW | 71 | 9 | 15 | 24 | 29 | — | — | — | — | — |
| 1975 | 5 | 81 | Jim Gustafson | Canada | F | — | — | — | — | — | — | — | — | — | — |
| 1975 | 6 | 99 | Jack Brownschidle | United States | D | 494 | 39 | 162 | 201 | 151 | — | — | — | — | — |
| 1975 | 7 | 117 | Doug Lindskog | Canada | F | — | — | — | — | — | — | — | — | — | — |
| 1975 | 8 | 135 | Dick Lamby | United States | D | 22 | 0 | 5 | 5 | 22 | — | — | — | — | — |
| 1975 | 9 | 151 | David McNab | Canada | G | — | — | — | — | — | — | — | — | — | — |
| 1976 | 1 | 7 | Bernie Federko | Canada | C | 1000 | 369 | 761 | 1130 | 487 | — | — | — | — | — |
| 1976 | 2 | 20 | Brian Sutter | Canada | LW | 779 | 303 | 333 | 636 | 1786 | — | — | — | — | — |
| 1976 | 2 | 25 | John Smrke | Canada | C | 103 | 11 | 17 | 28 | 33 | — | — | — | — | — |
| 1976 | 3 | 43 | Jim Kirkpatrick | Canada | D | — | — | — | — | — | — | — | — | — | — |
| 1976 | 4 | 56 | Mike Liut | Canada | G | 664 | 0 | 13 | 13 | 22 | 294 | 271 | 74 | — | 3.49 |
| 1976 | 4 | 61 | Paul Skidmore | United States | G | 2 | 0 | 0 | 0 | 0 | 1 | 1 | 0 | — | 3.00 |
| 1976 | 6 | 97 | Nels Goddard | Canada | D | — | — | — | — | — | — | — | — | — | — |
| 1976 | 7 | 113 | Mike Eaves | United States | F | 324 | 83 | 143 | 226 | 80 | — | — | — | — | — |
| 1976 | 8 | 121 | Jacques Soguel | Switzerland | C | — | — | — | — | — | — | — | — | — | — |
| 1976 | 9 | 124 | Dave Dornseif | United States | D | — | — | — | — | — | — | — | — | — | — |
| 1976 | 10 | 126 | Brad Wilson | Canada | C | — | — | — | — | — | — | — | — | — | — |
| 1976 | 11 | 128 | Don Hoene | United States | F | — | — | — | — | — | — | — | — | — | — |
| 1976 | 12 | 130 | Goran Lindblom | Sweden | D | — | — | — | — | — | — | — | — | — | — |
| 1976 | 13 | 132 | Jim Bales | Canada | G | — | — | — | — | — | — | — | — | — | — |
| 1976 | 14 | 134 | Anders Håkansson | Sweden | LW | 330 | 52 | 46 | 98 | 141 | — | — | — | — | — |
| 1976 | 15 | 135 | Juhani Wallenius | Finland | F | — | — | — | — | — | — | — | — | — | — |
| 1977 | 1 | 9 | Scott Campbell | Canada | D | 80 | 4 | 21 | 25 | 243 | — | — | — | — | — |
| 1977 | 2 | 27 | Neil LaBatte | Canada | D | 26 | 0 | 2 | 2 | 19 | — | — | — | — | — |
| 1977 | 3 | 45 | Tom Roulston | Canada | RW | 195 | 47 | 49 | 96 | 74 | — | — | — | — | — |
| 1977 | 4 | 63 | Tony Currie | Canada | RW | 290 | 92 | 119 | 211 | 83 | — | — | — | — | — |
| 1977 | 5 | 81 | Bruce Hamilton | Canada | LW | — | — | — | — | — | — | — | — | — | — |
| 1977 | 6 | 99 | Gary McMonagle | Canada | F | — | — | — | — | — | — | — | — | — | — |
| 1977 | 7 | 117 | Matti Forss | Finland | C | — | — | — | — | — | — | — | — | — | — |
| 1977 | 8 | 132 | Raimo Hirvonen | Finland | D | — | — | — | — | — | — | — | — | — | — |
| 1977 | 9 | 147 | Bjorn Olsson | Sweden | D | — | — | — | — | — | — | — | — | — | — |
| 1978 | 1 | 3 | Wayne Babych | Canada | RW | 519 | 192 | 246 | 438 | 498 | — | — | — | — | — |
| 1978 | 3 | 39 | Steve Harrison | Canada | D | — | — | — | — | — | — | — | — | — | — |
| 1978 | 5 | 72 | Kevin Willison | Canada | D | — | — | — | — | — | — | — | — | — | — |
| 1978 | 6 | 89 | Jim Nill | Canada | RW | 524 | 58 | 87 | 145 | 854 | — | — | — | — | — |
| 1978 | 7 | 106 | Steve Stockman | Canada | C | — | — | — | — | — | — | — | — | — | — |
| 1978 | 7 | 109 | Paul MacLean | Canada | RW | 719 | 324 | 349 | 673 | 968 | — | — | — | — | — |
| 1978 | 8 | 123 | Denis Houle | Canada | LW | — | — | — | — | — | — | — | — | — | — |
| 1978 | 9 | 140 | Tony Meagher | Canada | RW | — | — | — | — | — | — | — | — | — | — |
| 1978 | 9 | 143 | Rick Simpson | Canada | LW | — | — | — | — | — | — | — | — | — | — |
| 1978 | 10 | 157 | Jim Lockhurst | Canada | G | — | — | — | — | — | — | — | — | — | — |
| 1978 | 10 | 160 | Bob Froese | Canada | G | 242 | 0 | 10 | 10 | 90 | 128 | 72 | 20 | — | 3.10 |
| 1978 | 10 | 170 | Dan Lerg | United States | F | — | — | — | — | — | — | — | — | — | — |
| 1978 | 11 | 173 | Risto Siltanen | Finland | D | 562 | 90 | 265 | 355 | 266 | — | — | — | — | — |
| 1978 | 11 | 175 | Dan Hermansson | Sweden | F | — | — | — | — | — | — | — | — | — | — |
| 1978 | 11 | 181 | Jean-Francois Boutin | Canada | LW | — | — | — | — | — | — | — | — | — | — |
| 1978 | 11 | 185 | John Sullivan | United States | F | — | — | — | — | — | — | — | — | — | — |
| 1978 | 12 | 188 | Serge Menard | Canada | RW | — | — | — | — | — | — | — | — | — | — |
| 1978 | 12 | 191 | Don Boyd | Canada | RW | — | — | — | — | — | — | — | — | — | — |
| 1978 | 12 | 197 | Paul Stasiuk | Canada | LW | — | — | — | — | — | — | — | — | — | — |
| 1978 | 12 | 200 | Gerd Truntschka | Germany | C | — | — | — | — | — | — | — | — | — | — |
| 1978 | 13 | 203 | Viktor Shkurdyuk | Russia | F | — | — | — | — | — | — | — | — | — | — |
| 1978 | 13 | 205 | Carl Bloomberg | United States | G | — | — | — | — | — | — | — | — | — | — |
| 1978 | 13 | 207 | Terry Kitching | Canada | RW | — | — | — | — | — | — | — | — | — | — |
| 1978 | 13 | 209 | Brian O'Connor | United States | D | — | — | — | — | — | — | — | — | — | — |
| 1978 | 13 | 210 | Brian Crombeen | Canada | D | — | — | — | — | — | — | — | — | — | — |
| 1978 | 13 | 211 | Mike Pidgeon | Canada | C | — | — | — | — | — | — | — | — | — | — |
| 1978 | 14 | 214 | John Cochrane | United States | RW | — | — | — | — | — | — | — | — | — | — |
| 1978 | 14 | 216 | Joe Casey | United States | D | — | — | — | — | — | — | — | — | — | — |
| 1978 | 14 | 218 | Jim Farrell | United States | F | — | — | — | — | — | — | — | — | — | — |
| 1978 | 14 | 220 | Frank Johnson | United States | D | — | — | — | — | — | — | — | — | — | — |
| 1978 | 14 | 221 | Blair Wheeler | Canada | D | — | — | — | — | — | — | — | — | — | — |
| 1979 | 1 | 2 | Perry Turnbull | Canada | LW | 608 | 188 | 163 | 351 | 1245 | — | — | — | — | — |
| 1979 | 4 | 65 | Bob Crawford | United States | RW | 246 | 71 | 71 | 142 | 72 | — | — | — | — | — |
| 1979 | 5 | 86 | Mark Reeds | Canada | RW | 365 | 45 | 114 | 159 | 135 | — | — | — | — | — |
| 1979 | 6 | 107 | Gilles Leduc | Canada | D | — | — | — | — | — | — | — | — | — | — |
| 1980 | 1 | 12 | Rik Wilson | United States | D | 251 | 25 | 65 | 90 | 220 | — | — | — | — | — |
| 1980 | 3 | 54 | Jim Pavese | United States | D | 328 | 13 | 44 | 57 | 689 | — | — | — | — | — |
| 1980 | 4 | 75 | Bob Brooke | United States | C | 447 | 69 | 97 | 166 | 520 | — | — | — | — | — |
| 1980 | 5 | 96 | Alain Lemieux | Canada | C | 119 | 28 | 44 | 72 | 38 | — | — | — | — | — |
| 1980 | 6 | 117 | Perry Anderson | Canada | LW | 400 | 50 | 59 | 109 | 1051 | — | — | — | — | — |
| 1980 | 7 | 138 | Roger Hägglund | Sweden | D | 3 | 0 | 0 | 0 | 0 | — | — | — | — | — |
| 1980 | 8 | 159 | Pat Rabbit | Canada | LW | — | — | — | — | — | — | — | — | — | — |
| 1980 | 9 | 180 | Peter Lindgren | Sweden | D | — | — | — | — | — | — | — | — | — | — |
| 1980 | 10 | 201 | John Smyth | Canada | D | — | — | — | — | — | — | — | — | — | — |
| 1981 | 1 | 20 | Marty Ruff | Canada | D | — | — | — | — | — | — | — | — | — | — |
| 1981 | 2 | 36 | Hakan Nordin | Sweden | D | — | — | — | — | — | — | — | — | — | — |
| 1981 | 3 | 62 | Gord Donnelly | Canada | D | 554 | 28 | 41 | 69 | 2069 | — | — | — | — | — |
| 1981 | 5 | 104 | Mike Hickey | Canada | C | — | — | — | — | — | — | — | — | — | — |
| 1981 | 6 | 125 | Peter Aslin | Sweden | G | — | — | — | — | — | — | — | — | — | — |
| 1981 | 7 | 146 | Erik Holmberg | Sweden | RW | — | — | — | — | — | — | — | — | — | — |
| 1981 | 8 | 167 | Alain Vigneault | Canada | D | 42 | 2 | 5 | 7 | 82 | — | — | — | — | — |
| 1981 | 9 | 188 | Dan Wood | Canada | RW | — | — | — | — | — | — | — | — | — | — |
| 1981 | 10 | 209 | Richard Zemlak | Canada | RW | 132 | 2 | 12 | 14 | 587 | — | — | — | — | — |
| 1982 | 3 | 50 | Mike Posavad | Canada | D | 8 | 0 | 0 | 0 | 0 | — | — | — | — | — |
| 1982 | 5 | 92 | Scott Machej | Canada | F | — | — | — | — | — | — | — | — | — | — |
| 1982 | 6 | 113 | Perry Ganchar | Canada | RW | 42 | 3 | 7 | 10 | 36 | — | — | — | — | — |
| 1982 | 7 | 134 | Doug Gilmour | Canada | C | 1474 | 450 | 964 | 1414 | 1301 | — | — | — | — | — |
| 1982 | 8 | 155 | Chris Delaney | United States | LW | — | — | — | — | — | — | — | — | — | — |
| 1982 | 9 | 176 | Matt Christensen | United States | C | — | — | — | — | — | — | — | — | — | — |
| 1982 | 10 | 197 | John Shumski | United States | C | — | — | — | — | — | — | — | — | — | — |
| 1982 | 11 | 218 | Brian Ahern | United States | LW | — | — | — | — | — | — | — | — | — | — |
| 1982 | 12 | 239 | Peter Smith | United States | G | — | — | — | — | — | — | — | — | — | — |
| 1984 | 2 | 26 | Brian Benning | Canada | D | 568 | 63 | 233 | 296 | 963 | — | — | — | — | — |
| 1984 | 2 | 32 | Tony Hrkac | Canada | C | 758 | 132 | 239 | 371 | 173 | — | — | — | — | — |
| 1984 | 3 | 50 | Toby Ducolon | United States | RW | — | — | — | — | — | — | — | — | — | — |
| 1984 | 3 | 53 | Robert Dirk | Canada | D | 402 | 13 | 29 | 42 | 786 | — | — | — | — | — |
| 1984 | 3 | 56 | Alan Perry | United States | G | — | — | — | — | — | — | — | — | — | — |
| 1984 | 4 | 71 | Graham Herring | Canada | D | — | — | — | — | — | — | — | — | — | — |
| 1984 | 5 | 92 | Scott Paluch | United States | D | — | — | — | — | — | — | — | — | — | — |
| 1984 | 6 | 113 | Steve Tuttle | Canada | RW | 144 | 28 | 28 | 56 | 12 | — | — | — | — | — |
| 1984 | 7 | 134 | Cliff Ronning | Canada | C | 1137 | 306 | 563 | 869 | 453 | — | — | — | — | — |
| 1984 | 8 | 148 | Don Porter | Canada | LW | — | — | — | — | — | — | — | — | — | — |
| 1984 | 8 | 155 | Jim Vesey | United States | C | 15 | 1 | 2 | 3 | 7 | — | — | — | — | — |
| 1984 | 9 | 176 | Daniel Jomphe | Canada | LW | — | — | — | — | — | — | — | — | — | — |
| 1984 | 10 | 196 | Tom Tilley | Canada | D | 174 | 4 | 38 | 42 | 89 | — | — | — | — | — |
| 1984 | 11 | 217 | Mark Cupolo | Canada | LW | — | — | — | — | — | — | — | — | — | — |
| 1984 | 12 | 237 | Mark Lanigan | United States | D | — | — | — | — | — | — | — | — | — | — |
| 1985 | 2 | 37 | Herb Raglan | Canada | LW | 343 | 33 | 56 | 89 | 775 | — | — | — | — | — |
| 1985 | 3 | 44 | Nelson Emerson | Canada | RW | 771 | 195 | 293 | 488 | 575 | — | — | — | — | — |
| 1985 | 3 | 54 | Ned Desmond | United States | D | — | — | — | — | — | — | — | — | — | — |
| 1985 | 5 | 100 | Dan Brooks | United States | D | — | — | — | — | — | — | — | — | — | — |
| 1985 | 6 | 121 | Rich Burchill | United States | G | — | — | — | — | — | — | — | — | — | — |
| 1985 | 7 | 138 | Pat Jablonski | United States | G | 128 | 0 | 4 | 4 | 13 | 28 | 62 | 18 | — | 3.74 |
| 1985 | 8 | 159 | Scott Brickey | United States | F | — | — | — | — | — | — | — | — | — | — |
| 1985 | 9 | 180 | Jeff Urban | United States | LW | — | — | — | — | — | — | — | — | — | — |
| 1985 | 10 | 201 | Vince Guidotti | United States | D | — | — | — | — | — | — | — | — | — | — |
| 1985 | 11 | 222 | Ron Saatzer | United States | C | — | — | — | — | — | — | — | — | — | — |
| 1985 | 12 | 243 | Dave Jecha | United States | D | — | — | — | — | — | — | — | — | — | — |
| 1986 | 1 | 10 | Jocelyn Lemieux | Canada | LW | 598 | 80 | 84 | 164 | 740 | — | — | — | — | — |
| 1986 | 2 | 31 | Mike Posma | United States | D | — | — | — | — | — | — | — | — | — | — |
| 1986 | 3 | 52 | Tony Hejna | United States | LW | — | — | — | — | — | — | — | — | — | — |
| 1986 | 4 | 73 | Glen Featherstone | Canada | D | 384 | 19 | 61 | 80 | 939 | — | — | — | — | — |
| 1986 | 5 | 87 | Michael Wolak | United States | C | — | — | — | — | — | — | — | — | — | — |
| 1986 | 6 | 115 | Mike O'Toole | Canada | F | — | — | — | — | — | — | — | — | — | — |
| 1986 | 7 | 136 | Andy May | Canada | F | — | — | — | — | — | — | — | — | — | — |
| 1986 | 8 | 157 | Randy Skarda | United States | D | 26 | 0 | 5 | 5 | 11 | — | — | — | — | — |
| 1986 | 9 | 178 | Martyn Ball | Canada | LW | — | — | — | — | — | — | — | — | — | — |
| 1986 | 10 | 199 | Rod Thacker | Canada | D | — | — | — | — | — | — | — | — | — | — |
| 1986 | 11 | 220 | Terry MacLean | Canada | C | — | — | — | — | — | — | — | — | — | — |
| 1986 | 12 | 234 | Bill Butler | United States | LW | — | — | — | — | — | — | — | — | — | — |
| 1986 | 12 | 241 | David O'Brien | United States | RW | — | — | — | — | — | — | — | — | — | — |
| 1986 | S | 13 | Marty Raus | United States | D | — | — | — | — | — | — | — | — | — | — |
| 1987 | 1 | 12 | Keith Osborne | Canada | RW | 16 | 1 | 3 | 4 | 16 | — | — | — | — | — |
| 1987 | 3 | 54 | Kevin Miehm↑ | Canada | C | 22 | 1 | 4 | 5 | 8 | — | — | — | — | — |
| 1987 | 3 | 59 | Robert Nordmark | Sweden | D | 236 | 13 | 70 | 83 | 254 | — | — | — | — | — |
| 1987 | 4 | 75 | Darin Smith | Canada | LW | — | — | — | — | — | — | — | — | — | — |
| 1987 | 4 | 82 | Andy Rymsha | Canada | RW | 6 | 0 | 0 | 0 | 23 | — | — | — | — | — |
| 1987 | 6 | 117 | Rob Robinson | Canada | D | 22 | 0 | 1 | 1 | 8 | — | — | — | — | — |
| 1987 | 7 | 138 | Todd Crabtree | United States | D | — | — | — | — | — | — | — | — | — | — |
| 1987 | 8 | 159 | Guy Hebert | United States | G | 491 | 0 | 6 | 6 | 22 | 191 | 222 | 56 | — | 2.81 |
| 1987 | 9 | 180 | Rob Dumas | Canada | D | — | — | — | — | — | — | — | — | — | — |
| 1987 | 10 | 201 | David Marvin | United States | D | — | — | — | — | — | — | — | — | — | — |
| 1987 | 10 | 207 | Andy Cesarski | United States | D | — | — | — | — | — | — | — | — | — | — |
| 1987 | 11 | 222 | Dan Rolfe | Canada | D | — | — | — | — | — | — | — | — | — | — |
| 1987 | 12 | 243 | Ray Savard | Canada | RW | — | — | — | — | — | — | — | — | — | — |
| 1988 | 1 | 9 | Rod Brind'Amour | Canada | C | 1484 | 452 | 732 | 1184 | 1100 | — | — | — | — | — |
| 1988 | 2 | 30 | Adrien Plavsic | Canada | D | 214 | 16 | 56 | 72 | 161 | — | — | — | — | — |
| 1988 | 3 | 51 | Rob Fournier | Canada | G | — | — | — | — | — | — | — | — | — | — |
| 1988 | 4 | 72 | Jaan Luik | Canada | D | — | — | — | — | — | — | — | — | — | — |
| 1988 | 5 | 105 | Dave Lacouture | United States | LW | — | — | — | — | — | — | — | — | — | — |
| 1988 | 6 | 114 | Dan Fowler | Canada | D | — | — | — | — | — | — | — | — | — | — |
| 1988 | 7 | 135 | Matt Hayes | United States | D | — | — | — | — | — | — | — | — | — | — |
| 1988 | 8 | 156 | John McCoy | United States | F | — | — | — | — | — | — | — | — | — | — |
| 1988 | 9 | 177 | Tony Twist | Canada | LW | 445 | 10 | 18 | 28 | 1121 | — | — | — | — | — |
| 1988 | 10 | 198 | Bret Hedican | United States | D | 1039 | 55 | 239 | 294 | 893 | — | — | — | — | — |
| 1988 | 11 | 219 | Heath DeBoer | United States | D | — | — | — | — | — | — | — | — | — | — |
| 1988 | 12 | 240 | Michael Francis | United States | G | — | — | — | — | — | — | — | — | — | — |
| 1988 | S | 14 | Mike McNeill | United States | RW | 63 | 5 | 11 | 16 | 18 | — | — | — | — | — |
| 1989 | 1 | 9 | Jason Marshall | Canada | D | 526 | 16 | 51 | 67 | 1004 | — | — | — | — | — |
| 1989 | 2 | 31 | Rick Corriveau | Canada | D | — | — | — | — | — | — | — | — | — | — |
| 1989 | 3 | 55 | Denny Felsner | United States | LW | 18 | 1 | 4 | 5 | 6 | — | — | — | — | — |
| 1989 | 5 | 93 | Daniel Laperrière | Canada | D | 48 | 2 | 5 | 7 | 27 | — | — | — | — | — |
| 1989 | 6 | 114 | David Roberts | United States | LW | 125 | 20 | 33 | 53 | 85 | — | — | — | — | — |
| 1989 | 6 | 124 | Derek Frenette | Canada | LW | — | — | — | — | — | — | — | — | — | — |
| 1989 | 7 | 135 | Jeff Batters | Canada | D | — | — | — | — | — | — | — | — | — | — |
| 1989 | 8 | 156 | Kevin Plager | United States | RW | — | — | — | — | — | — | — | — | — | — |
| 1989 | 9 | 177 | John Roderick | United States | D | — | — | — | — | — | — | — | — | — | — |
| 1989 | 10 | 198 | John Valo | United States | D | — | — | — | — | — | — | — | — | — | — |
| 1989 | 11 | 219 | Brian Lukowski | United States | G | — | — | — | — | — | — | — | — | — | — |
| 1989 | S | 14 | Rob Tustian | United States | D | — | — | — | — | — | — | — | — | — | — |
| 1990 | 2 | 33 | Craig Johnson | United States | LW | 557 | 75 | 98 | 173 | 260 | — | — | — | — | — |
| 1990 | 3 | 54 | Patrice Tardif | Canada | C | 65 | 7 | 11 | 18 | 78 | — | — | — | — | — |
| 1990 | 5 | 96 | Jason Ruff | Canada | LW | 14 | 3 | 3 | 6 | 10 | — | — | — | — | — |
| 1990 | 6 | 117 | Kurtis Miller | United States | LW | — | — | — | — | — | — | — | — | — | — |
| 1990 | 7 | 138 | Wayne Conlan | United States | F | — | — | — | — | — | — | — | — | — | — |
| 1990 | 9 | 180 | Parris Duffus | United States | G | 1 | 0 | 0 | 0 | 0 | 0 | 0 | 0 | — | 2.07 |
| 1990 | 10 | 201 | Steve Widmeyer | Canada | RW | — | — | — | — | — | — | — | — | — | — |
| 1990 | 11 | 222 | Joe Hawley | Canada | C | — | — | — | — | — | — | — | — | — | — |
| 1990 | 12 | 243 | Joe Fleming | United States | D | — | — | — | — | — | — | — | — | — | — |
| 1990 | S | 17 | Geoff Sarjeant | Canada | G | 8 | 0 | 1 | 1 | 4 | 1 | 2 | 1 | — | 4.12 |
| 1991 | 2 | 27 | Steve Staios | Canada | D | 1001 | 56 | 164 | 220 | 1322 | — | — | — | — | — |
| 1991 | 3 | 64 | Kyle Reeves | Canada | C | — | — | — | — | — | — | — | — | — | — |
| 1991 | 3 | 65 | Nathan LaFayette | Canada | C | 187 | 17 | 20 | 37 | 103 | — | — | — | — | — |
| 1991 | 4 | 87 | Grayden Reid | Canada | C | — | — | — | — | — | — | — | — | — | — |
| 1991 | 5 | 109 | Jeff Callinan | United States | G | — | — | — | — | — | — | — | — | — | — |
| 1991 | 6 | 131 | Bruce Gardiner | Canada | C | 312 | 34 | 54 | 88 | 263 | — | — | — | — | — |
| 1991 | 7 | 153 | Terry Hollinger | Canada | D | 7 | 0 | 0 | 0 | 2 | — | — | — | — | — |
| 1991 | 8 | 175 | Chris Kenady | United States | RW | 7 | 0 | 2 | 2 | 0 | — | — | — | — | — |
| 1991 | 9 | 197 | Jed Fiebelkorn | United States | LW | — | — | — | — | — | — | — | — | — | — |
| 1991 | 10 | 219 | Chris MacKenzie | Canada | C | — | — | — | — | — | — | — | — | — | — |
| 1991 | 11 | 241 | Kevin Rappana | United States | D | — | — | — | — | — | — | — | — | — | — |
| 1991 | 12 | 263 | Mike Veisor | United States | G | — | — | — | — | — | — | — | — | — | — |
| 1991 | S | 27 | Chris McKee | United States | F | — | — | — | — | — | — | — | — | — | — |
| 1992 | 2 | 38 | Igor Korolev | Russia | C | 795 | 119 | 227 | 346 | 330 | — | — | — | — | — |
| 1992 | 3 | 62 | Vitali Karamnov | Russia | LW | 92 | 12 | 20 | 32 | 65 | — | — | — | — | — |
| 1992 | 3 | 64 | Vitali Prokhorov | Russia | LW | 83 | 19 | 11 | 30 | 35 | — | — | — | — | — |
| 1992 | 4 | 86 | Lee Leslie | Canada | LW | — | — | — | — | — | — | — | — | — | — |
| 1992 | 6 | 134 | Bob Lachance | United States | C | — | — | — | — | — | — | — | — | — | — |
| 1992 | 7 | 158 | Ian Laperrière | Canada | RW | 1083 | 121 | 215 | 336 | 1956 | — | — | — | — | — |
| 1992 | 7 | 160 | Lance Burns | Canada | C | — | — | — | — | — | — | — | — | — | — |
| 1992 | 8 | 180 | Igor Boldin | Russia | C | — | — | — | — | — | — | — | — | — | — |
| 1992 | 8 | 182 | Nick Naumenko | United States | D | — | — | — | — | — | — | — | — | — | — |
| 1992 | 9 | 206 | Todd Harris | Canada | D | — | — | — | — | — | — | — | — | — | — |
| 1992 | 10 | 230 | Yuri Gunko | Ukraine | D | — | — | — | — | — | — | — | — | — | — |
| 1992 | 11 | 259 | Wade Salzman | United States | G | — | — | — | — | — | — | — | — | — | — |
| 1993 | 2 | 37 | Maxim Bets | Russia | LW | 3 | 0 | 0 | 0 | 0 | — | — | — | — | — |
| 1993 | 3 | 63 | Jamie Rivers | Canada | D | 454 | 17 | 49 | 66 | 385 | — | — | — | — | — |
| 1993 | 4 | 89 | Jamal Mayers | Canada | RW | 915 | 90 | 129 | 219 | 1200 | — | — | — | — | — |
| 1993 | 6 | 141 | Todd Kelman | Canada | D | — | — | — | — | — | — | — | — | — | — |
| 1993 | 7 | 167 | Mike Buzak | Canada | G | — | — | — | — | — | — | — | — | — | — |
| 1993 | 8 | 193 | Eric Boguniecki | United States | RW | 178 | 34 | 42 | 76 | 105 | — | — | — | — | — |
| 1993 | 9 | 219 | Mike Grier | United States | RW | 1060 | 162 | 221 | 383 | 510 | — | — | — | — | — |
| 1993 | 10 | 245 | Libor Procházka | Czech Republic | D | — | — | — | — | — | — | — | — | — | — |
| 1993 | 11 | 271 | Alexander Vasilevski | Ukraine | RW | 4 | 0 | 0 | 0 | 2 | — | — | — | — | — |
| 1993 | 11 | 275 | Christer Olsson | Sweden | D | 56 | 4 | 12 | 16 | 24 | — | — | — | — | — |
| 1994 | 3 | 68 | Stéphane Roy | Canada | C | — | — | — | — | — | — | — | — | — | — |
| 1994 | 4 | 94 | Tyler Harlton | Canada | D | — | — | — | — | — | — | — | — | — | — |
| 1994 | 5 | 120 | Edvin Frylen | Sweden | D | — | — | — | — | — | — | — | — | — | — |
| 1994 | 7 | 172 | Roman Vopat | Czech Republic | C | 133 | 6 | 14 | 20 | 253 | — | — | — | — | — |
| 1994 | 8 | 198 | Steve Noble | Canada | C | — | — | — | — | — | — | — | — | — | — |
| 1994 | 9 | 224 | Marc Stephan | Canada | C | — | — | — | — | — | — | — | — | — | — |
| 1994 | 10 | 250 | Kevin Harper | Canada | D | — | — | — | — | — | — | — | — | — | — |
| 1994 | 11 | 276 | Scott Fankhouser | United States | G | 23 | 0 | 0 | 0 | 6 | 4 | 12 | 2 | — | 3.31 |
| 1995 | 2 | 49 | Jochen Hecht | Germany | LW | 833 | 186 | 277 | 463 | 458 | — | — | — | — | — |
| 1995 | 3 | 75 | Scott Roche | Canada | G | — | — | — | — | — | — | — | — | — | — |
| 1995 | 4 | 101 | Michal Handzuš | Slovakia | C | 1009 | 185 | 298 | 483 | 498 | — | — | — | — | — |
| 1995 | 5 | 127 | Jeff Ambrosio | Canada | LW | — | — | — | — | — | — | — | — | — | — |
| 1995 | 6 | 153 | Denis Hamel | Canada | LW | 192 | 19 | 12 | 31 | 77 | — | — | — | — | — |
| 1995 | 7 | 179 | Jean-Luc Grand-Pierre | Canada | D | 269 | 7 | 13 | 20 | 311 | — | — | — | — | — |
| 1995 | 8 | 205 | Derek Bekar | Canada | LW | 11 | 0 | 0 | 0 | 6 | — | — | — | — | — |
| 1995 | 9 | 209 | Libor Zábranský | Czech Republic | D | 40 | 1 | 6 | 7 | 50 | — | — | — | — | — |
| 1996 | 1 | 14 | Marty Reasoner | United States | C | 798 | 97 | 169 | 266 | 379 | — | — | — | — | — |
| 1996 | 3 | 67 | Gordie Dwyer | Canada | LW | 108 | 0 | 5 | 5 | 394 | — | — | — | — | — |
| 1996 | 4 | 95 | Jonathan Zukiwsky | Canada | C | — | — | — | — | — | — | — | — | — | — |
| 1996 | 4 | 97 | Andrei Petrakov | Russia | RW | — | — | — | — | — | — | — | — | — | — |
| 1996 | 6 | 159 | Stephen Wagner | Canada | G | — | — | — | — | — | — | — | — | — | — |
| 1996 | 7 | 169 | Daniel Corso | Canada | C | 77 | 14 | 11 | 25 | 20 | — | — | — | — | — |
| 1996 | 7 | 177 | Reed Low | Canada | RW | 256 | 3 | 16 | 19 | 725 | — | — | — | — | — |
| 1996 | 8 | 196 | Andrej Podkonický | Slovakia | LW | 8 | 1 | 0 | 1 | 2 | — | — | — | — | — |
| 1996 | 8 | 203 | Tony Hutchins | United States | F | — | — | — | — | — | — | — | — | — | — |
| 1996 | 9 | 229 | Konstantin Shafranov | Kazakhstan | RW | 5 | 2 | 1 | 3 | 0 | — | — | — | — | — |
| 1997 | 2 | 40 | Tyler Rennette | Canada | C | — | — | — | — | — | — | — | — | — | — |
| 1997 | 4 | 86 | Didier Tremblay | Canada | D | — | — | — | — | — | — | — | — | — | — |
| 1997 | 4 | 98 | Jan Horáček | Czech Republic | D | — | — | — | — | — | — | — | — | — | — |
| 1997 | 4 | 106 | Jame Pollock | Canada | D | 9 | 0 | 0 | 0 | 6 | — | — | — | — | — |
| 1997 | 6 | 149 | Nicholas Bilotto | Canada | D | — | — | — | — | — | — | — | — | — | — |
| 1997 | 7 | 177 | Ladislav Nagy | Slovakia | LW | 435 | 115 | 196 | 311 | 358 | — | — | — | — | — |
| 1997 | 8 | 206 | Bobby Haglund | United States | LW | — | — | — | — | — | — | — | — | — | — |
| 1997 | 9 | 232 | Dmitri Plekhanov | Russia | D | — | — | — | — | — | — | — | — | — | — |
| 1997 | 9 | 244 | Marek Ivan | Czech Republic | C | — | — | — | — | — | — | — | — | — | — |
| 1998 | 1 | 24 | Christian Bäckman | Sweden | D | 302 | 23 | 56 | 79 | 182 | — | — | — | — | — |
| 1998 | 2 | 41 | Maxim Linnik | Ukraine | D | — | — | — | — | — | — | — | — | — | — |
| 1998 | 3 | 83 | Matt Walker | Canada | D | 314 | 4 | 26 | 30 | 464 | — | — | — | — | — |
| 1998 | 6 | 157 | Brad Voth | Canada | W | — | — | — | — | — | — | — | — | — | — |
| 1998 | 6 | 170 | Andrei Troschinsky | Kazakhstan | C | — | — | — | — | — | — | — | — | — | — |
| 1998 | 7 | 197 | Brad Twordik | Canada | LW | — | — | — | — | — | — | — | — | — | — |
| 1998 | 8 | 225 | Yevgeny Pastukh | Ukraine | LW | — | — | — | — | — | — | — | — | — | — |
| 1998 | 9 | 255 | John Pohl | United States | C | 115 | 17 | 21 | 38 | 24 | — | — | — | — | — |
| 1999 | 1 | 17 | Barret Jackman | Canada | D | 876 | 29 | 157 | 186 | 1102 | — | — | — | — | — |
| 1999 | 3 | 85 | Peter Smrek | Slovakia | D | 28 | 2 | 4 | 6 | 18 | — | — | — | — | — |
| 1999 | 4 | 114 | Chad Starling | Canada | D | — | — | — | — | — | — | — | — | — | — |
| 1999 | 5 | 143 | Trevor Byrne | United States | D | — | — | — | — | — | — | — | — | — | — |
| 1999 | 6 | 180 | Tore Vikingstad | Norway | C | — | — | — | — | — | — | — | — | — | — |
| 1999 | 7 | 203 | Phil Osaer | United States | G | — | — | — | — | — | — | — | — | — | — |
| 1999 | 8 | 221 | Colin Hemingway | Canada | RW | 3 | 0 | 0 | 0 | 0 | — | — | — | — | — |
| 1999 | 8 | 232 | Alexander Khavanov | Russia | D | 348 | 27 | 75 | 102 | 233 | — | — | — | — | — |
| 1999 | 9 | 260 | Brian McMeekin | Canada | D | — | — | — | — | — | — | — | — | — | — |
| 1999 | 9 | 270 | James Desmarais | Canada | C | — | — | — | — | — | — | — | — | — | — |
| 2000 | 1 | 30 | Jeff Taffe | United States | C | 180 | 21 | 25 | 46 | 40 | — | — | — | — | — |
| 2000 | 2 | 65 | David Morisset | Canada | RW | 4 | 0 | 0 | 0 | 5 | — | — | — | — | — |
| 2000 | 3 | 75 | Justin Papineau | Canada | C | 81 | 11 | 8 | 19 | 12 | — | — | — | — | — |
| 2000 | 3 | 96 | Antoine Bergeron | Canada | D | — | — | — | — | — | — | — | — | — | — |
| 2000 | 4 | 129 | Troy Riddle | United States | C | — | — | — | — | — | — | — | — | — | — |
| 2000 | 5 | 167 | Craig Weller | Canada | RW | 95 | 4 | 10 | 14 | 127 | — | — | — | — | — |
| 2000 | 7 | 229 | Brett Lutes | Canada | LW | — | — | — | — | — | — | — | — | — | — |
| 2000 | 8 | 261 | Reinhard Divis | Austria | G | 28 | 0 | 0 | 0 | 2 | 6 | 9 | 2 | 1 | 3.32 |
| 2000 | 9 | 293 | Lauri Kinos | Finland | D | — | — | — | — | — | — | — | — | — | — |
| 2001 | 2 | 57 | Jay McClement | Canada | C | 906 | 90 | 154 | 244 | 325 | — | — | — | — | — |
| 2001 | 3 | 89 | Tuomas Nissinen | Finland | G | — | — | — | — | — | — | — | — | — | — |
| 2001 | 4 | 122 | Igor Valeev | Russia | LW | — | — | — | — | — | — | — | — | — | — |
| 2001 | 5 | 159 | Dmitri Semin | Russia | C | — | — | — | — | — | — | — | — | — | — |
| 2001 | 6 | 190 | Brett Scheffelmaier | Canada | D | — | — | — | — | — | — | — | — | — | — |
| 2001 | 8 | 253 | Petr Čajánek | Czech Republic | C | 269 | 46 | 107 | 153 | 144 | — | — | — | — | — |
| 2001 | 9 | 270 | Grant Jacobsen | Canada | C | — | — | — | — | — | — | — | — | — | — |
| 2001 | 9 | 283 | Simon Skoog | Sweden | D | — | — | — | — | — | — | — | — | — | — |
| 2002 | 2 | 48 | Aleksei Shkotov | Russia | RW | — | — | — | — | — | — | — | — | — | — |
| 2002 | 2 | 62 | Andriy Mikhnov | Ukraine | C | — | — | — | — | — | — | — | — | — | — |
| 2002 | 3 | 89 | Tomáš Troliga | Slovakia | LW | — | — | — | — | — | — | — | — | — | — |
| 2002 | 4 | 120 | Robin Jonsson | Sweden | D | — | — | — | — | — | — | — | — | — | — |
| 2002 | 5 | 165 | Justin Maiser | United States | LW | — | — | — | — | — | — | — | — | — | — |
| 2002 | 6 | 190 | D. J. King | Canada | W | 118 | 4 | 7 | 11 | 215 | — | — | — | — | — |
| 2002 | 7 | 221 | Jonas Johnson | Sweden | C | — | — | — | — | — | — | — | — | — | — |
| 2002 | 8 | 253 | Tom Koivisto | Finland | D | 22 | 2 | 4 | 6 | 10 | — | — | — | — | — |
| 2002 | 9 | 284 | Ryan MacMurchy | Canada | RW | — | — | — | — | — | — | — | — | — | — |
| 2003 | 1 | 30 | Shawn Belle | Canada | D | 20 | 0 | 1 | 1 | 2 | — | — | — | — | — |
| 2003 | 2 | 62 | David Backes | United States | C | 965 | 248 | 313 | 561 | 1148 | — | — | — | — | — |
| 2003 | 3 | 84 | Konstantin Barulin | Russia | G | — | — | — | — | — | — | — | — | — | — |
| 2003 | 3 | 88 | Zack Fitzgerald | United States | D | 1 | 0 | 0 | 0 | 0 | — | — | — | — | — |
| 2003 | 3 | 101 | Konstantin Zakharov | Belarus | RW | — | — | — | — | — | — | — | — | — | — |
| 2003 | 4 | 127 | Alexandre Bolduc | Canada | C | 65 | 2 | 3 | 5 | 44 | — | — | — | — | — |
| 2003 | 5 | 148 | Lee Stempniak | United States | RW | 911 | 203 | 266 | 469 | 327 | — | — | — | — | — |
| 2003 | 5 | 159 | Chris Beckford-Tseu | Canada | G | 1 | 0 | 0 | 0 | 0 | 0 | 0 | — | 0 | 2.22 |
| 2003 | 6 | 189 | Jonathan Lehun | Canada | C | — | — | — | — | — | — | — | — | — | — |
| 2003 | 7 | 221 | Evgeny Skachkov | Russia | W | — | — | — | — | — | — | — | — | — | — |
| 2003 | 8 | 253 | Andrei Pervyshin | Russia | D | — | — | — | — | — | — | — | — | — | — |
| 2003 | 9 | 284 | Juhamatti Aaltonen | Finland | RW | — | — | — | — | — | — | — | — | — | — |
| 2004 | 1 | 17 | Marek Schwarz | Czech Republic | G | 6 | 0 | 0 | 0 | 0 | 0 | 2 | — | 0 | 4.32 |
| 2004 | 2 | 49 | Carl Söderberg | Sweden | C | 597 | 110 | 187 | 297 | 210 | — | — | — | — | — |
| 2004 | 3 | 83 | Viktor Alexandrov | Kazakhstan | RW | — | — | — | — | — | — | — | — | — | — |
| 2004 | 4 | 116 | Michal Birner | Czech Republic | LW | — | — | — | — | — | — | — | — | — | — |
| 2004 | 5 | 136 | Nikita Nikitin | Russia | D | 259 | 17 | 59 | 76 | 85 | — | — | — | — | — |
| 2004 | 6 | 180 | Roman Polák | Czech Republic | D | 806 | 26 | 114 | 140 | 643 | — | — | — | — | — |
| 2004 | 7 | 211 | David Fredriksson | Sweden | W | — | — | — | — | — | — | — | — | — | — |
| 2004 | 9 | 277 | Jonathan Michel Boutin | Canada | RW | — | — | — | — | — | — | — | — | — | — |
| 2005 | 1 | 24 | T. J. Oshie | United States | RW | 1010 | 302 | 393 | 695 | 541 | — | — | — | — | — |
| 2005 | 2 | 37 | Scott Jackson | Canada | D | 1 | 0 | 0 | 0 | 0 | — | — | — | — | — |
| 2005 | 3 | 85 | Ben Bishop | United States | G | 413 | 0 | 12 | 12 | 34 | 222 | 128 | — | 36 | 2.32 |
| 2005 | 5 | 156 | Ryan Reaves | Canada | W | 962 | 66 | 74 | 140 | 1137 | — | — | — | — | — |
| 2005 | 6 | 169 | Mike Gauthier | Canada | D | — | — | — | — | — | — | — | — | — | — |
| 2005 | 6 | 171 | Nick Drazenovic | Canada | C | 12 | 0 | 0 | 0 | 6 | — | — | — | — | — |
| 2005 | 7 | 219 | Nikolai Lemtyugov | Russia | RW | — | — | — | — | — | — | — | — | — | — |
| 2006 | 1 | 1 | Erik Johnson | United States | D | 987 | 93 | 250 | 343 | 540 | — | — | — | — | — |
| 2006 | 1 | 25 | Patrik Berglund | Sweden | C | 717 | 170 | 156 | 326 | 248 | — | — | — | — | — |
| 2006 | 2 | 31 | Tomáš Káňa | Czech Republic | RW | 6 | 0 | 2 | 2 | 2 | — | — | — | — | — |
| 2006 | 3 | 64 | Jonas Junland↑ | Sweden | D | 4 | 0 | 2 | 2 | 2 | — | — | — | — | — |
| 2006 | 4 | 94 | Ryan Turek | United States | D | — | — | — | — | — | — | — | — | — | — |
| 2006 | 4 | 106 | Reto Berra | Switzerland | G | 76 | 0 | 1 | 1 | 4 | 20 | 36 | — | 4 | 2.85 |
| 2006 | 5 | 124 | Andy Sackrison | United States | C | — | — | — | — | — | — | — | — | — | — |
| 2006 | 6 | 154 | Matthew McCollem | United States | LW | — | — | — | — | — | — | — | — | — | — |
| 2006 | 7 | 184 | Alexander Hellström | Sweden | D | — | — | — | — | — | — | — | — | — | — |
| 2007 | 1 | 13 | Lars Eller | Denmark | C | 1184 | 193 | 246 | 439 | 647 | — | — | — | — | — |
| 2007 | 1 | 18 | Ian Cole | United States | D | 990 | 38 | 195 | 233 | 871 | — | — | — | — | — |
| 2007 | 1 | 26 | David Perron | Canada | W | 1239 | 332 | 480 | 812 | 877 | — | — | — | — | — |
| 2007 | 2 | 39 | Simon Hjalmarsson | Sweden | LW | — | — | — | — | — | — | — | — | — | — |
| 2007 | 2 | 44 | Aaron Palushaj | United States | W | 68 | 3 | 11 | 14 | 18 | — | — | — | — | — |
| 2007 | 3 | 85 | Brett Sonne | Canada | C | — | — | — | — | — | — | — | — | — | — |
| 2007 | 4 | 96 | Cade Fairchild | United States | D | 5 | 0 | 1 | 1 | 0 | — | — | — | — | — |
| 2007 | 4 | 100 | Travis Erstad | United States | RW | — | — | — | — | — | — | — | — | — | — |
| 2007 | 6 | 160 | Anthony Peluso | Canada | RW | 148 | 4 | 10 | 14 | 220 | — | — | — | — | — |
| 2007 | 7 | 190 | Trevor Nill | United States | C | — | — | — | — | — | — | — | — | — | — |
| 2008 | 1 | 4 | Alex Pietrangelo | Canada | D | 1087 | 148 | 489 | 637 | 355 | — | — | — | — | — |
| 2008 | 2 | 33 | Philip McRae | United States | C | 15 | 1 | 2 | 3 | 2 | — | — | — | — | — |
| 2008 | 2 | 34 | Jake Allen | Canada | G | 497 | 0 | 7 | 7 | 14 | 225 | 201 | — | 45 | 2.75 |
| 2008 | 3 | 65 | Jori Lehterä | Finland | C | 307 | 34 | 77 | 111 | 167 | — | — | — | — | — |
| 2008 | 3 | 70 | James Livingston | Canada | RW | — | — | — | — | — | — | — | — | — | — |
| 2008 | 3 | 87 | Ian Schultz | Canada | RW | — | — | — | — | — | — | — | — | — | — |
| 2008 | 4 | 95 | David Warsofsky | United States | D | 55 | 2 | 9 | 11 | 8 | — | — | — | — | — |
| 2008 | 5 | 125 | Kristofer Berglund | Sweden | D | — | — | — | — | — | — | — | — | — | — |
| 2008 | 6 | 155 | Anthony Nigro | Canada | C | — | — | — | — | — | — | — | — | — | — |
| 2008 | 7 | 185 | Paul Karpowich | Canada | G | — | — | — | — | — | — | — | — | — | — |
| 2009 | 1 | 17 | David Rundblad | Sweden | D | 113 | 4 | 21 | 25 | 30 | — | — | — | — | — |
| 2009 | 2 | 48 | Brett Ponich | Canada | D | — | — | — | — | — | — | — | — | — | — |
| 2009 | 3 | 78 | Sergei Andronov | Russia | RW | — | — | — | — | — | — | — | — | — | — |
| 2009 | 4 | 108 | Tyler Shattock | Canada | RW | — | — | — | — | — | — | — | — | — | — |
| 2009 | 6 | 168 | David Shields | United States | D | — | — | — | — | — | — | — | — | — | — |
| 2009 | 7 | 202 | Max Tardy | United States | C | — | — | — | — | — | — | — | — | — | — |
| 2010 | 1 | 14 | Jaden Schwartz | Canada | LW | 861 | 233 | 320 | 553 | 245 | — | — | — | — | — |
| 2010 | 1 | 16 | Vladimir Tarasenko | Russia | RW | 906 | 327 | 382 | 709 | 213 | — | — | — | — | — |
| 2010 | 2 | 44 | Sebastian Wännström | Sweden | C | — | — | — | — | — | — | — | — | — | — |
| 2010 | 3 | 74 | Max Gardiner | United States | C | — | — | — | — | — | — | — | — | — | — |
| 2010 | 4 | 104 | Jani Hakanpää | Finland | D | 290 | 15 | 30 | 45 | 173 | — | — | — | — | — |
| 2010 | 5 | 134 | Cody Beach | Canada | RW | — | — | — | — | — | — | — | — | — | — |
| 2010 | 6 | 164 | Stephen Macaulay | Canada | LW | — | — | — | — | — | — | — | — | — | — |
| 2011 | 2 | 32 | Ty Rattie | Canada | RW | 99 | 13 | 17 | 30 | 12 | — | — | — | — | — |
| 2011 | 2 | 41 | Dmitrij Jaškin | Czech Republic | RW | 315 | 27 | 43 | 70 | 92 | — | — | — | — | — |
| 2011 | 2 | 46 | Joel Edmundson | Canada | D | 685 | 37 | 116 | 153 | 508 | — | — | — | — | — |
| 2011 | 3 | 88 | Jordan Binnington | Canada | G | 377 | 0 | 9 | 9 | 67 | 186 | 136 | — | 43 | 2.83 |
| 2011 | 4 | 102 | Yannick Veilleux | Canada | LW | — | — | — | — | — | — | — | — | — | — |
| 2011 | 5 | 132 | Niklas Lundström | Sweden | G | — | — | — | — | — | — | — | — | — | — |
| 2011 | 6 | 162 | Ryan Tesink | Canada | RW | — | — | — | — | — | — | — | — | — | — |
| 2011 | 7 | 192 | Teemu Eronen | Finland | D | — | — | — | — | — | — | — | — | — | — |
| 2012 | 1 | 25 | Jordan Schmaltz | United States | D | 42 | 0 | 5 | 5 | 12 | — | — | — | — | — |
| 2012 | 2 | 56 | Sam Kurker | United States | RW | — | — | — | — | — | — | — | — | — | — |
| 2012 | 3 | 67 | Mackenzie MacEachern | United States | LW | 131 | 12 | 12 | 24 | 67 | — | — | — | — | — |
| 2012 | 3 | 86 | Colton Parayko | Canada | D | 800 | 81 | 232 | 313 | 221 | — | — | — | — | — |
| 2012 | 4 | 116 | Nicholas Walters | Canada | D | — | — | — | — | — | — | — | — | — | — |
| 2012 | 5 | 146 | Francois Tremblay | Canada | G | — | — | — | — | — | — | — | — | — | — |
| 2012 | 6 | 176 | Petteri Lindbohm | Finland | D | 49 | 2 | 2 | 4 | 42 | — | — | — | — | — |
| 2012 | 7 | 206 | Tyrel Seaman | Canada | C | — | — | — | — | — | — | — | — | — | — |
| 2013 | 2 | 47 | Thomas Vannelli | United States | D | — | — | — | — | — | — | — | — | — | — |
| 2013 | 2 | 57 | William Carrier | Canada | LW | 526 | 69 | 67 | 136 | 238 | — | — | — | — | — |
| 2013 | 4 | 112 | Zach Pochiro | United States | C | — | — | — | — | — | — | — | — | — | — |
| 2013 | 6 | 173 | Santeri Saari | Finland | D | — | — | — | — | — | — | — | — | — | — |
| 2014 | 1 | 21 | Robby Fabbri | Canada | C | 463 | 108 | 113 | 221 | 219 | — | — | — | — | — |
| 2014 | 2 | 33 | Ivan Barbashev | Russia | C | 667 | 149 | 202 | 351 | 200 | — | — | — | — | — |
| 2014 | 2 | 52 | Maxim Letunov | Russia | C | 3 | 1 | 0 | 1 | 0 | — | — | — | — | — |
| 2014 | 3 | 82 | Jake Walman | Canada | D | 320 | 40 | 71 | 111 | 159 | — | — | — | — | — |
| 2014 | 4 | 94 | Ville Husso | Finland | G | 165 | 0 | 1 | 1 | 6 | 81 | 54 | — | 21 | 3.07 |
| 2014 | 4 | 110 | Austin Poganski | United States | RW | 22 | 0 | 0 | 0 | 7 | — | — | — | — | — |
| 2014 | 5 | 124 | Jaedon Descheneau | Canada | C | — | — | — | — | — | — | — | — | — | — |
| 2014 | 6 | 172 | Chandler Yakimowicz | United States | C | — | — | — | — | — | — | — | — | — | — |
| 2014 | 6 | 176 | Sammy Blais | Canada | LW | 278 | 30 | 49 | 79 | 132 | — | — | — | — | — |
| 2014 | 7 | 202 | Dwyer Tschantz | United States | RW | — | — | — | — | — | — | — | — | — | — |
| 2015 | 2 | 56 | Vince Dunn | Canada | D | 623 | 86 | 244 | 330 | 393 | — | — | — | — | — |
| 2015 | 4 | 94 | Adam Musil | Canada | C | — | — | — | — | — | — | — | — | — | — |
| 2015 | 4 | 116 | Glenn Gawdin | Canada | C | 13 | 0 | 1 | 1 | 4 | — | — | — | — | — |
| 2015 | 5 | 127 | Niko Mikkola | Finland | D | 396 | 17 | 56 | 73 | 310 | — | — | — | — | — |
| 2015 | 5 | 146 | Luke Opilka | United States | G | — | — | — | — | — | — | — | — | — | — |
| 2015 | 6 | 176 | Liam Dunda | Canada | LW | — | — | — | — | — | — | — | — | — | — |
| 2016 | 1 | 26 | Tage Thompson | United States | C | 529 | 216 | 190 | 406 | 238 | — | — | — | — | — |
| 2016 | 2 | 35 | Jordan Kyrou | Canada | C | 488 | 168 | 210 | 378 | 116 | — | — | — | — | — |
| 2016 | 2 | 59 | Evan Fitzpatrick | Canada | G | — | — | — | — | — | — | — | — | — | — |
| 2016 | 4 | 119 | Tanner Kaspick | Canada | C | — | — | — | — | — | — | — | — | — | — |
| 2016 | 5 | 125 | Nolan Stevens | United States | C | — | — | — | — | — | — | — | — | — | — |
| 2016 | 5 | 144 | Conner Bleackley | Canada | C | — | — | — | — | — | — | — | — | — | — |
| 2016 | 7 | 209 | Nikolaj Krag Christensen | Denmark | C/LW | — | — | — | — | — | — | — | — | — | — |
| 2016 | 7 | 211 | Filip Helt | Czech Republic | LW | — | — | — | — | — | — | — | — | — | — |
| 2017 | 1 | 20 | Robert Thomas | Canada | C | 530 | 132 | 328 | 460 | 172 | — | — | — | — | — |
| 2017 | 1 | 31 | Klim Kostin | Russia | RW | 190 | 25 | 28 | 53 | 169 | — | — | — | — | — |
| 2017 | 4 | 113 | Alexey Toropchenko | Russia | F | 324 | 34 | 37 | 71 | 110 | — | — | — | — | — |
| 2017 | 5 | 130 | David Noel | Canada | D | — | — | — | — | — | — | — | — | — | — |
| 2017 | 6 | 175 | Trenton Bourque | Canada | D | — | — | — | — | — | — | — | — | — | — |
| 2017 | 7 | 206 | Anton Andersson | Sweden | D | — | — | — | — | — | — | — | — | — | — |
| 2018 | 1 | 25 | Dominik Bokk | Germany | RW | — | — | — | — | — | — | — | — | — | — |
| 2018 | 2 | 45 | Scott Perunovich | United States | D | 108 | 2 | 30 | 32 | 30 | — | — | — | — | — |
| 2018 | 4 | 107 | Joel Hofer | Canada | G | 115 | 0 | 3 | 3 | 10 | 59 | 35 | — | 10 | 2.67 |
| 2018 | 5 | 138 | Hugh McGing | United States | F | 9 | 1 | 1 | 2 | 0 | — | — | — | — | — |
| 2018 | 6 | 169 | Mathias Laferrière | Canada | F | — | — | — | — | — | — | — | — | — | — |
| 2018 | 7 | 200 | Tyler Tucker | Canada | D | 159 | 8 | 22 | 30 | 209 | — | — | — | — | — |
| 2019 | 2 | 62 | Nikita Alexandrov | Russia | C | 51 | 3 | 6 | 9 | 12 | — | — | — | — | — |
| 2019 | 3 | 93 | Colten Ellis | Canada | G | 16 | 0 | 1 | 1 | 0 | 8 | 4 | — | 2 | 2.90 |
| 2019 | 5 | 155 | Keean Washkurak | Canada | C | — | — | — | — | — | — | — | — | — | — |
| 2019 | 7 | 208 | Vadim Zherenko | Russia | G | — | — | — | — | — | — | — | — | — | — |
| 2019 | 7 | 217 | Jeremy Michel | Canada | LW | — | — | — | — | — | — | — | — | — | — |
| 2020 | 1 | 26 | Jake Neighbours | Canada | LW | 280 | 71 | 61 | 132 | 146 | — | — | — | — | — |
| 2020 | 3 | 86 | Dylan Peterson | United States | LW | — | — | — | — | — | — | — | — | — | — |
| 2020 | 3 | 88 | Leo Lööf | Sweden | D | — | — | — | — | — | — | — | — | — | — |
| 2020 | 4 | 119 | Tanner Dickinson | United States | C | — | — | — | — | — | — | — | — | — | — |
| 2020 | 5 | 150 | Matthew Kessel | United States | D | 99 | 3 | 10 | 13 | 32 | — | — | — | — | — |
| 2020 | 6 | 163 | Will Cranley | Canada | G | — | — | — | — | — | — | — | — | — | — |
| 2020 | 7 | 194 | Noah Beck | Canada | D | — | — | — | — | — | — | — | — | — | — |
| 2021 | 1 | 17 | Zachary Bolduc | Canada | C | 175 | 36 | 39 | 75 | 71 | — | — | — | — | — |
| 2021 | 3 | 71 | Simon Robertsson | Sweden | RW | — | — | — | — | — | — | — | — | — | — |
| 2021 | 5 | 145 | Tyson Galloway | Canada | D | — | — | — | — | — | — | — | — | — | — |
| 2021 | 7 | 198 | Ivan Vorobyov | Russia | RW | — | — | — | — | — | — | — | — | — | — |
| 2022 | 1 | 23 | Jimmy Snuggerud | United States | RW | 77 | 22 | 33 | 55 | 18 | — | — | — | — | — |
| 2022 | 3 | 73 | Aleksanteri Kaskimäki | Finland | C | 5 | 0 | 0 | 0 | 0 | — | — | — | — | — |
| 2022 | 3 | 88 | Michael Buchinger | Canada | D | — | — | — | — | — | — | — | — | — | — |
| 2022 | 4 | 120 | Arseni Koromyslov | Russia | D | — | — | — | — | — | — | — | — | — | — |
| 2022 | 5 | 152 | Marc-Andre Gaudet | Canada | D | — | — | — | — | — | — | — | — | — | — |
| 2022 | 6 | 184 | Landon Sim | Canada | C | — | — | — | — | — | — | — | — | — | — |
| 2023 | 1 | 10 | Dalibor Dvorský | Slovakia | C | 73 | 12 | 9 | 21 | 26 | — | — | — | — | — |
| 2023 | 1 | 25 | Otto Stenberg | Sweden | C | 32 | 3 | 7 | 10 | 5 | — | — | — | — | — |
| 2023 | 1 | 29 | Theo Lindstein | Sweden | D | 17 | 2 | 2 | 4 | 6 | — | — | — | — | — |
| 2023 | 3 | 74 | Quinton Burns | Canada | D | — | — | — | — | — | — | — | — | — | — |
| 2023 | 3 | 76 | Juraj Pekarcik | Slovakia | LW | — | — | — | — | — | — | — | — | — | — |
| 2023 | 4 | 106 | Jakub Stancl | Czechia | C | — | — | — | — | — | — | — | — | — | — |
| 2023 | 5 | 138 | Paul Fischer | United States | D | — | — | — | — | — | — | — | — | — | — |
| 2023 | 6 | 170 | Matthew Mayich | Canada | D | — | — | — | — | — | — | — | — | — | — |
| 2023 | 7 | 202 | Nikita Susuyev | Russia | RW | — | — | — | — | — | — | — | — | — | — |
| 2024 | 1 | 16 | Adam Jiříček | Czechia | D | — | — | — | — | — | — | — | — | — | — |
| 2024 | 2 | 48 | Colin Ralph | United States | D | — | — | — | — | — | — | — | — | — | — |
| 2024 | 2 | 56 | Luke Fischer | United States | D | — | — | — | — | — | — | — | — | — | — |
| 2024 | 3 | 81 | Ondřej Kos | Czechia | LW | — | — | — | — | — | — | — | — | — | — |
| 2024 | 3 | 95 | Adam Jecho | Czechia | C | — | — | — | — | — | — | — | — | — | — |
| 2024 | 4 | 113 | Tomas Mrsic | Canada | C | — | — | — | — | — | — | — | — | — | — |
| 2024 | 5 | 145 | William McIsaac | Canada | D | — | — | — | — | — | — | — | — | — | — |
| 2024 | 7 | 209 | Antoine Dorion | Canada | C | — | — | — | — | — | — | — | — | — | — |
| 2024 | 7 | 211 | Matvei Korotky | Russia | C | — | — | — | — | — | — | — | — | — | — |
| 2025 | 1 | 19 | Justin Carbonneau | Canada | RW | — | — | — | — | — | — | — | — | — | — |
| 2025 | 5 | 147 | Mikhail Fyodorov | Russia | RW | — | — | — | — | — | — | — | — | — | — |
| 2025 | 6 | 179 | Love Härenstam | Sweden | G | — | — | — | — | — | — | — | — | — | — |
| 2026 | 1 | 11 | Tynan Lawrence | Canada | C | — | — | — | — | — | — | — | — | — | — |
| 2026 | 1 | 16 | Maddox Dagenais | Canada | C | — | — | — | — | — | — | — | — | — | — |
| 2026 | 3 | 75 | Luke Schairer | United States | D | — | — | — | — | — | — | — | — | — | — |
| 2026 | 4 | 107 | Landon Nycz | United States | D | — | — | — | — | — | — | — | — | — | — |
| 2026 | 4 | 123 | Vladimir Proskurin | Russia | G | — | — | — | — | — | — | — | — | — | — |
| 2026 | 5 | 139 | Nick Bogas | United States | D | — | — | — | — | — | — | — | — | — | — |
| 2026 | 5 | 150 | Carter Stevens | Canada | C | — | — | — | — | — | — | — | — | — | — |
| 2026 | 6 | 171 | Lars Steiner | Switzerland | RW | — | — | — | — | — | — | — | — | — | — |
| 2026 | 7 | 203 | Colin Fitzgerald | Canada | C | — | — | — | — | — | — | — | — | — | — |

== See also ==
- 1967 NHL Expansion Draft
