= Pierre Lagacé =

Canadian ice hockey player

- Born: October 27, 1957 (age 68) Montreal, Quebec, Canada
- Height: 6 ft 2 in (188 cm)
- Weight: 205 lb (93 kg; 14 st 9 lb)
- Position: Centre
- Played for: Quebec Nordiques (WHA)
- NHL draft: 46th overall, 1977; Montreal Canadiens
- WHA draft: 73rd overall, 1977; Quebec Nordiques
- Playing career: 1977–1986

Pierre Lagacé (born October 27, 1957) is a former professional ice hockey centre. He was drafted by the Quebec Nordiques in the eighth round, 73rd overall, of the 1977 WHA Amateur Draft. He was also drafted by the Montreal Canadiens of the National Hockey League yet never played in that league.

He played 38 regular-season games in the World Hockey Association with the Nordiques in the 1977–78 and 1978–79 seasons.

Lagace currently resides in Erie, Pennsylvania and owns Pano's restaurants.

== Career statistics ==
=== Regular season and playoffs ===
			Regular season					Playoffs
Season	Team	League	GP	G	A	Pts	PIM	GP	G	A	Pts	PIM
1974–75	Trois–Rivieres Draveurs	QMJHL	72	36	51	87	114	6	0	2	2	9
1975–76	Trois–Rivieres Draveurs	QMJHL	7	1	1	2	17	––	––	––	––	––
1975–76	Quebec Remparts	QMJHL	64	12	28	40	131	14	3	6	9	52
1976–77	Quebec Remparts	QMJHL	71	22	30	52	168	14	9	11	20	21
1977–78	Hampton Gulls	AHL	22	2	3	5	4	––	––	––	––	––
1977–78	Quebec Nordiques	WHA	17	2	4	6	2	1	0	0	0	0
1978–79	Broome Dusters	AHL	3	0	0	0	0	––	––	––	––	––
1978–79	Erie Blades	NEHL	39	13	22	35	46	3	2	2	4	12
1978–79	Quebec Nordiques	WHA	21	0	1	1	12	3	0	1	1	2
1979–80	Erie Blades	EHL	30	5	12	17	30	––	––	––	––	––
1979–80	Baltimore Clippers	EHL	27	11	11	22	16	––	––	––	––	––
1980–81	Baltimore Clippers	EHL	27	8	9	17	29	––	––	––	––	––
1980–81	Salem Raiders	EHL	43	22	18	40	43	6	3	2	5	2
1981–82	Salem Raiders	ACHL	24	19	19	38	45	––	––	––	––	––
1982–83	Virginia Raiders	ACHL	5	1	3	4	19	––	––	––	––	––
1982–83	Nashville South Stars	ACHL	1	0	1	1	0	––	––	––	––	––
1982–83	Erie Golden Blades	ACHL	––	––	––	––	––	1	0	0	0	4
1983–84	Erie Golden Blades	ACHL	11	5	7	12	2	––	––	––	––	––
1984–85	Virginia Lancers	ACHL	1	1	0	1	0	––	––	––	––	––
1985–86	Erie Golden Blades	ACHL	5	1	1	2	2	––	––	––	––	––
WHA totals			38	2	5	7	14	4	0	1	1	2
