= Scott Campbell (ice hockey, born 1957) =

Canadian ice hockey player (1957–2022)

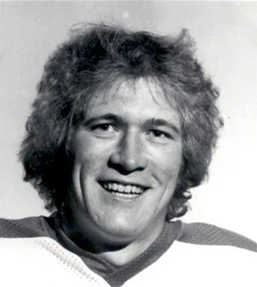
- Campbell in 1978 photo
- Born: June 22, 1957 Toronto, Ontario, Canada
- Died: September 3, 2022 (aged 65) Guelph, Ontario, Canada
- Height: 6 ft 3 in (191 cm)
- Weight: 205 lb (93 kg; 14 st 9 lb)
- Position: Defence
- Shot: Left
- Played for: Houston Aeros; Winnipeg Jets; St. Louis Blues
- NHL draft: 9th overall, 1977; St. Louis Blues
- WHA draft: 1st overall, 1977; Houston Aeros
- Playing career: 1977–1982

Gary Scott Campbell (June 22, 1957 – September 3, 2022) was a Canadian ice hockey defenceman who was drafted first overall by the Houston Aeros of the World Hockey Association (WHA) in the 1977 WHA Amateur Draft. Campbell was born in Toronto, Ontario, but grew up in Guelph, Ontario.

== Playing career ==
After a stellar junior career with the London Knights, Campbell was selected first overall by the Houston Aeros of the World Hockey Association (WHA) in the 1977 WHA Amateur Draft, as well as ninth overall by the St. Louis Blues of the National Hockey League (NHL) in the 1977 NHL amateur draft. Campbell opted to join the Aeros.

Campbell played 149 WHA games for the Aeros and the Winnipeg Jets, and came to the NHL with the Jets when they joined that league in 1980. He and Morris Lukowich were the two players protected by the Jets from the dispersal draft, showing the faith the team had in his abilities. However, the cold weather in Winnipeg exacerbated a chronic asthma condition and he requested a trade after a season there. The asthma condition ultimately forced him into retirement at the age of 25 after briefly also playing for the St. Louis Blues.

== Post hockey ==
After retiring from professional hockey, Campbell became involved in harness racing and found success as a stable owner. He died on September 3, 2022, from cancer.

== Career statistics ==
			Regular season					Playoffs
Season	Team	League	GP	G	A	Pts	PIM	GP	G	A	Pts	PIM
1973–74	Guelph Biltmore Mad Hatters	SOJHL	—	—	—	—	—	—	—	—	—	—
1974–75	London Knights	OMJHL	68	4	15	19	52	—	—	—	—	—
1975–76	London Knights	OMJHL	62	6	25	31	66	5	0	0	0	13
1976–77	London Knights	OMJHL	60	23	44	67	86	20	5	8	13	18
1977–78	Houston Aeros	WHA	75	8	29	37	116	6	1	1	2	8
1978–79	Winnipeg Jets	WHA	74	3	15	18	248	10	0	2	2	25
1979–80	Winnipeg Jets	NHL	63	3	17	20	136	—	—	—	—	—
1980–81	Winnipeg Jets	NHL	14	1	4	5	55	—	—	—	—	—
1980–81	Tulsa Oilers	CHL	3	0	0	0	9	—	—	—	—	—
1981–82	St. Louis Blues	NHL	3	0	0	0	52	—	—	—	—	—
1981–82	Salt Lake Golden Eagles	AHL	3	0	1	1	31	—	—	—	—	—
WHA totals			149	11	44	55	364	16	1	3	4	33
NHL totals			80	4	21	25	243	—	—	—	—	—

Preceded by Bernie Federko	St. Louis Blues first-round draft pick 1977	Succeeded by Wayne Babych
Preceded by Blair Chapman	WHA First Overall Draft Pick; 1977	Succeeded by None
Preceded by Richard Mulhern	Houston Aeros first round draft pick 1977	Succeeded by None
