= Dan Clark (ice hockey) =

Canadian ice hockey player

- Born: November 3, 1957 (age 68) Toronto, Ontario, Canada
- Height: 6 ft 3 in (191 cm)
- Weight: 220 lb (100 kg; 15 st 10 lb)
- Position: Defence
- Shot: Left
- Played for: New York Rangers
- NHL draft: 89th overall, 1977; Philadelphia Flyers; 110th overall, 1978; New York Rangers
- WHA draft: 34th overall, 1977; Edmonton Oilers
- Playing career: 1977–1986

Dan Clark (born November 3, 1957) is a Canadian retired professional ice hockey player. He played four games in the National Hockey League (NHL) with the New York Rangers during the 1978–79 season. The rest of his career, which lasted from 1977 to 1986, was spent in the minor leagues.

== Career statistics ==
=== Regular season and playoffs ===
			Regular season					Playoffs
Season	Team	League	GP	G	A	Pts	PIM	GP	G	A	Pts	PIM
1974–75	Langley Lords	BCJHL	50	11	22	33	127	—	—	—	—	—
1975–76	Kamloops Chiefs	WCHL	71	0	26	26	109	12	2	2	4	25
1976–77	Kamloops Chiefs	WCHL	61	4	27	31	189	3	0	1	1	25
1977–78	Maine Mariners	AHL	6	0	1	1	6	—	—	—	—	—
1977–78	Milwaukee Admirals	IHL	67	7	18	25	245	5	0	0	0	4
1978–79	New York Rangers	NHL	4	0	1	1	6	—	—	—	—	—
1978–79	New Haven Nighthawks	AHL	71	8	20	28	167	10	0	3	3	27
1979–80	New Haven Nighthawks	AHL	75	0	24	24	247	10	1	4	5	21
1980–81	New Haven Nighthawks	AHL	54	2	16	18	163	4	0	0	0	8
1981–82	Hershey Bears	AHL	19	0	6	6	58	—	—	—	—	—
1981–82	Springfield Indians	AHL	10	0	3	3	26	—	—	—	—	—
1981–82	EHC Grindelwald	NLB	27	11	14	25	62	—	—	—	—	—
1982–83	EHC Grindelwald	NLB	36	14	16	30	76	—	—	—	—	—
1985–86	New Haven Nighthawks	AHL	10	1	2	3	35	—	—	—	—	—
AHL totals			245	11	72	83	702	24	1	7	8	56
NHL totals			4	0	1	1	6	—	—	—	—	—
