= Ron Areshenkoff =

Canadian ice hockey player (1957–2019)

- Born: June 13, 1957 Grand Forks, British Columbia, Canada
- Died: December 15, 2019 (aged 62) Grand Forks, British Columbia, Canada
- Height: 6 ft 0 in (183 cm)
- Weight: 175 lb (79 kg; 12 st 7 lb)
- Position: Centre
- Shot: Left
- Played for: Edmonton Oilers
- NHL draft: 32nd overall, 1977; Buffalo Sabres
- WHA draft: 11th overall, 1977; Edmonton Oilers
- Playing career: 1977–1980

Ronald Areshenkoff (June 13, 1957 – December 15, 2019) was a Canadian professional ice hockey centre. He was drafted in the second round, 32nd overall, by the Buffalo Sabres in the 1977 NHL amateur draft. He played in four games in the National Hockey League (NHL) with the Edmonton Oilers, going scoreless. He died in 2019 in his hometown of Grand Forks after a long illness.

== Career statistics ==
=== Regular season and playoffs ===
			Regular season					Playoffs
Season	Team	League	GP	G	A	Pts	PIM	GP	G	A	Pts	PIM
1974–75	Vernon Vikings	BCJHL	65	36	50	86	40	—	—	—	—	—
1975–76	Medicine Hat Tigers	WCHL	71	25	35	60	77	3	1	2	3	0
1976–77	Medicine Hat Tigers	WCHL	60	51	42	93	57	4	1	0	1	0
1977–78	Hershey Bears	AHL	38	9	14	23	38	—	—	—	—	—
1979–80	Edmonton Oilers	NHL	4	0	0	0	0	—	—	—	—	—
1979–80	Houston Apollos	CHL	55	14	24	38	72	2	0	0	0	0
1982–83	Trail Smoke Eaters	QIHL	7	1	3	4	4	1	1	0	1	2
1983–84	Trail Smoke Eaters	WIHL	45	12	20	32	—	—	—	—	—	—
NHL totals			4	0	0	0	0	—	—	—	—	—

== Awards ==
- WCHL Second All-Star Team – 1977

Preceded by Mike Crombeen	Edmonton Oilers first-round draft pick 1977	Succeeded by Kevin Lowe
