= Dave Morrow =

Canadian ice hockey player

- Born: May 4, 1957 (age 68) Edmonton, Alberta, Canada
- Height: 6 ft 1 in (185 cm)
- Weight: 183 lb (83 kg; 13 st 1 lb)
- Position: Defence / Left Wing
- Shot: Left
- Played for: Indianapolis Racers
- NHL draft: 56th overall, 1977; Vancouver Canucks
- WHA draft: 18th overall, 1977; Cincinnati Stingers
- Playing career: 1977–1980

Dave Morrow (born May 4, 1957) is a Canadian former professional ice hockey defenceman and winger who played in the World Hockey Association (WHA).

== Career ==
Drafted in the fourth round of the 1977 NHL amateur draft by the Vancouver Canucks, Morrow opted to play in the WHA after being selected by the Cincinnati Stingers in the second round of the 1977 WHA amateur draft. He played ten games for the Indianapolis Racers during the 1978–79 WHA season.

== Personal life ==
Morrow is the father of Joe Morrow, who was a 2011 first-round draft pick of the Pittsburgh Penguins, and Josh Morrow, who was a 2002 seventh-round pick of the Nashville Predators.

== Career statistics ==
			Regular season					Playoffs
Season	Team	League	GP	G	A	Pts	PIM	GP	G	A	Pts	PIM
1973–74	Edmonton Oil Kings	WCHL	1	0	0	0	0	—	—	—	—	—
1973–74	Edmonton Mets	AJHL	55	8	25	33	65	—	—	—	—	—
1974–75	Spruce Grove Mets	AJHL	14	5	17	22	41	—	—	—	—	—
1974–75	Edmonton Oil Kings	WCHL	63	7	24	31	78	—	—	—	—	—
1975–76	Edmonton Oil Kings	WCHL	72	17	53	70	125	5	1	1	2	21
1976–77	Portland Winter Hawks	WCHL	5	0	4	4	19	—	—	—	—	—
1976–77	Calgary Centennials	WCHL	60	23	45	68	112	9	5	10	15	14
1977–78	Tulsa Oilers	CHL	63	0	8	8	20	7	0	0	0	2
1978–79	Dallas Black Hawks	CHL	5	0	1	1	9	—	—	—	—	—
1978–79	Indianapolis Racers	WHA	10	2	10	12	29	—	—	—	—	—
1978–79	Fort Wayne Komets	IHL	37	2	15	17	19	13	0	3	3	13
1979–80	Fort Wayne Komets	IHL	4	1	2	3	0	—	—	—	—	—
WHA totals			10	2	10	12	29	—	—	—	—	—
IHL totals			41	3	17	20	19	13	0	3	3	13
CHL totals			68	0	9	9	29	7	0	0	0	2
