= Warren Holmes =

Canadian ice hockey player

- Born: February 18, 1957 (age 68); Beeton, Ontario, Canada
- Height: 6 ft 2 in (188 cm)
- Weight: 190 lb (86 kg; 13 st 8 lb)
- Position: Centre
- Caught: Left
- Played for: Los Angeles Kings
- NHL draft: 85th overall, 1977; Los Angeles Kings
- WHA draft: 72nd overall, 1977; Winnipeg Jets
- Playing career: 1977–1986

Warren Holmes (born February 18, 1957) is a Canadian former professional hockey player who played for the Los Angeles Kings of the National Hockey League, as well as a number of American Hockey League and International Hockey League teams.

Holmes was born in Beeton, Ontario. Holmes has two daughters, born in 1988 and 1991. He currently resides in Houston, Texas, USA.

== Career statistics ==
			Regular season					Playoffs
Season	Team	League	GP	G	A	Pts	PIM	GP	G	A	Pts	PIM
1974–85	Ottawa 67's	OMJHL	54	9	17	26	47	7	6	2	8	6
1975–76	Ottawa 67's	OMJHL	28	3	11	14	6	—	—	—	—	—
1976–77	Ottawa 67's	OMJHL	36	18	29	47	31	19	11	10	21	23
1977–78	Saginaw Gears	IHL	78	48	33	81	51	5	3	3	6	14
1978–79	Saginaw Gears	IHL	38	11	18	29	30	4	1	3	4	8
1978–79	Milwaukee Admirals	IHL	31	11	17	28	33	—	—	—	—	—
1978–79	Springfield Indians	AHL	4	0	0	0	0	—	—	—	—	—
1979–80	Saginaw Gears	IHL	72	37	55	92	62	7	5	3	8	21
1979–80	Binghamton Dusters	AHL	2	0	0	0	0	—	—	—	—	—
1980–81	Saginaw Gears	IHL	40	21	26	47	27	13	8	9	17	19
1980–81	Houston Apollos	CHL	25	7	7	14	18	—	—	—	—	—
1981–82	Los Angeles Kings	NHL	3	0	2	2	0	—	—	—	—	—
1981–82	New Haven Nighthawks	AHL	73	28	28	56	29	4	1	5	6	0
1982–83	Los Angeles Kings	NHL	39	8	16	24	7	—	—	—	—	—
1982–83	New Haven Nighthawks	AHL	35	17	18	35	26	—	—	—	—	—
1983–84	Los Angeles Kings	NHL	3	0	0	0	0	—	—	—	—	—
1983–84	New Haven Nighthawks	AHL	76	26	35	61	25	—	—	—	—	—
1984–85	Flint Generals	IHL	80	23	44	67	70	7	3	3	6	11
1985–86	Saginaw Generals	IHL	65	17	20	37	88	—	—	—	—	—
NHL totals			45	8	18	26	7	—	—	—	—	—
AHL totals			190	71	81	152	80	4	1	5	6	0
