= Floyd Lahache =

Canadian ice hockey player

- Born: September 17, 1957 (age 68) Kahnawake, Quebec, Canada
- Height: 5 ft 10 in (178 cm)
- Weight: 175 lb (79 kg; 12 st 7 lb)
- Position: Defence
- Shot: Right
- Played for: Cincinnati Stingers
- NHL draft: 114th overall, 1977; Chicago Black Hawks
- WHA draft: 25th overall, 1977; Cincinnati Stingers
- Playing career: 1977–1984

Floyd Lahache (born September 17, 1957) is a Canadian former professional ice hockey player who played in the World Hockey Association (WHA). Drafted in the seventh round of the 1977 NHL amateur draft by the Chicago Black Hawks, Lahache opted to play in the WHA after being selected by the Cincinnati Stingers in the third round of the 1977 WHA Amateur Draft. He played in eleven games for the Stingers during the 1977–78 WHA season. As a youth, he played in the 1969 and 1970 Quebec International Pee-Wee Hockey Tournaments with a minor ice hockey team from Caughnawaga.

== Career statistics ==
			Regular season					Playoffs
Season	Team	League	GP	G	A	Pts	PIM	GP	G	A	Pts	PIM
1973–74	Sherbrooke Castors	QMJHL	70	2	13	15	155	5	0	1	1	18
1974–75	Sherbrooke Castors	QMJHL	65	5	21	26	296	12	2	5	7	30
1974–75	Sherbrooke Castors	QMJHL	71	11	49	60	159	17	2	7	9	58
1974–75	Sherbrooke Castors	QMJHL	70	10	37	47	225	18	4	16	20	90
1977–78	Hampton Gulls	AHL	44	4	4	8	87	—	—	—	—	—
1977–78	Binghamton Dusters	AHL	12	0	1	1	11	—	—	—	—	—
1977–78	Cincinnati Stingers	WHA	11	0	3	3	13	—	—	—	—	—
1978–79	Los Angeles Blades	PHL	5	0	2	2	9	—	—	—	—	—
1978–79	Tucson Rustlers	PHL	16	2	4	6	59	—	—	—	—	—
1978–79	Erie Blades	NEHL	30	1	11	12	75	—	—	—	—	—
1978–79	Springfield Indians	AHL	5	0	1	1	11	—	—	—	—	—
1979–80	Flint Generals	IHL	78	9	21	30	193	5	0	1	1	13
1980–81	Flint Generals	IHL	79	11	53	64	261	7	2	4	6	16
1981–82	Flint Generals	IHL	77	6	31	37	238	4	2	2	4	4
1982–83	Flint Generals	IHL	72	2	39	41	271	5	1	3	4	23
1983–84	Kalamazoo Wings	IHL	69	8	24	32	165	3	0	0	0	20
WHA totals			11	0	3	3	13	—	—	—	—	—
AHL totals			61	4	6	10	109	—	—	—	—	—
IHL totals			375	36	168	204	1,128	24	5	10	15	76

== Awards ==
- 1975–76 QMJHL West Second All-Star Team
- 1976–77 QMJHL Third All-Star Team
