= Brent Tremblay =

Canadian ice hockey player

- Born: November 1, 1957 (age 68) North Bay, Ontario, Canada
- Height: 6 ft 2 in (188 cm)
- Weight: 192 lb (87 kg; 13 st 10 lb)
- Position: Defence
- Shot: Left
- Played for: Washington Capitals
- NHL draft: 127th overall, 1977; Washington Capitals
- Playing career: 1977–1980

Brent Francis Tremblay (born November 1, 1957) is a Canadian former ice hockey defenceman. He played 10 games in the National Hockey League with the Washington Capitals during the 1978–79 and 1979–80 seasons. He was selected 127th overall by the Capitals in the 1977 NHL Amateur Draft.

== Career statistics ==
=== Regular season and playoffs ===
			Regular season					Playoffs
Season	Team	League	GP	G	A	Pts	PIM	GP	G	A	Pts	PIM
1973–74	North Bay Trappers U16	GNML	—	—	—	—	—	—	—	—	—	—
1974–75	Markham Waxers	OPJAHL	—	—	—	—	—	—	—	—	—	—
1975–76	Hull Festivals	QMJHL	72	2	18	20	129	6	0	0	0	7
1976–77	Hull Olympiques	QMJHL	28	6	0	6	45	—	—	—	—	—
1976–77	Trois-Rivières Draveurs	QMJHL	32	3	17	20	91	6	0	2	2	4
1977–78	Hershey Bears	AHL	11	0	1	1	15	—	—	—	—	—
1977–78	Port Huron Flags	IHL	61	7	25	32	231	17	5	8	13	74
1978–79	Washington Capitals	NHL	1	0	0	0	0	—	—	—	—	—
1978–79	Hershey Bears	AHL	75	2	16	18	109	4	0	0	0	9
1979–80	Washington Capitals	NHL	9	1	0	1	6	—	—	—	—	—
1979–80	Hershey Bears	AHL	26	2	11	13	54	—	—	—	—	—
AHL totals			112	4	28	32	178	4	0	0	0	9
NHL totals			10	1	0	1	6	—	—	—	—	—
