= Rick Vasko =

Canadian ice hockey player (born 1957)

- Born: January 12, 1957 (age 69) St. Catharines, Ontario, Canada
- Height: 6 ft 0 in (183 cm)
- Weight: 200 lb (91 kg; 14 st 4 lb)
- Position: Defence
- Played for: Detroit Red Wings
- NHL draft: 37th overall, 1977; Detroit Red Wings
- WHA draft: 53rd overall, 1977; Indianapolis Racers
- Playing career: 1977–1982

Richard John Vasko (born January 12, 1957) is a Canadian former professional ice hockey defenceman who played in the National Hockey League for the Detroit Red Wings.

== Career ==
As a youth, Vasko played in the 1970 Quebec International Pee-Wee Hockey Tournament with a minor ice hockey team from Cedar Hill, Toronto.

Vasko was drafted 37th overall by the Detroit Red Wings in the 1977 NHL amateur draft and 53rd overall by the Indianapolis Racers in the 1977 WHA Amateur Draft. He went on to play 31 regular season games for the Red Wings over three seasons.

== Career statistics ==
=== Regular season and playoffs ===
			Regular season					Playoffs
Season	Team	League	GP	G	A	Pts	PIM	GP	G	A	Pts	PIM
1975–76	Peterborough Petes	OMJHL	63	9	20	29	52	—	—	—	—	—
1976–77	Peterborough Petes	OMJHL	65	6	30	36	122	—	—	—	—	—
1977–78	Kansas City Red Wings	CHL	70	11	30	41	72	—	—	—	—	—
1977–78	Detroit Red Wings	NHL	3	0	0	0	7	—	—	—	—	—
1978–79	Kansas City Red Wings	CHL	75	21	38	59	67	4	1	1	2	2
1979–80	Adirondack Red Wings	AHL	71	22	39	61	79	—	—	—	—	—
1979–80	Detroit Red Wings	NHL	8	0	0	0	2	—	—	—	—	—
1980–81	Adirondack Red Wings	AHL	57	17	34	51	78	18	9	12	21	31
1980–81	Detroit Red Wings	NHL	20	3	7	10	20	—	—	—	—	—
1981–82	Oklahoma City Stars	CHL	68	9	32	41	92	4	1	1	2	4
NHL totals			31	3	7	10	29	—	—	—	—	—
