= Eddy Godin =

Canadian ice hockey player (born 1957)

- Born: March 29, 1957 (age 68) Donnacona, Quebec, Canada
- Height: 5 ft 10 in (178 cm)
- Weight: 190 lb (86 kg; 13 st 8 lb)
- Position: Right wing
- Shot: Left
- Played for: Washington Capitals
- NHL draft: 39th overall, 1977; Washington Capitals
- WHA draft: 65th overall, 1977; Quebec Nordiques
- Playing career: 1977–1983

Joseph Eddy Alain Godin (born March 29, 1957) is a [Canadian former professional ice hockey forward. He played 27 games in the National Hockey League with the Washington Capitals during the 1977–78 and 1978–79 seasons. The rest of his career, which lasted from 1977 to 1983, was spent in the minor American Hockey League. He was selected 39th overall in the 1977 NHL Amateur Draft by the Capitals and 65th overall in the 1977 WHA Amateur Draft by the Quebec Nordiques of the World Hockey Association. As a youth, he played in the 1968, 1969 and 1970 Quebec International Pee-Wee Hockey Tournaments with a minor ice hockey team from Donnacona.

== Career statistics ==
=== Regular season and playoffs ===
			Regular season					Playoffs
Season	Team	League	GP	G	A	Pts	PIM	GP	G	A	Pts	PIM
1974–75	Quebec Remparts	QMJHL	72	24	33	57	79	6	3	7	10	7
1975–76	Quebec Remparts	QMJHL	72	38	62	100	89	15	6	14	20	56
1975–76	Quebec Remparts	M-Cup	—	—	—	—	—	3	1	0	1	2
1976–77	Quebec Remparts	QMJHL	71	62	83	145	70	14	11	11	22	15
1977–78	Washington Capitals	NHL	18	3	3	6	6	—	—	—	—	—
1977–78	Hershey Bears	AHL	50	22	20	42	26	—	—	—	—	—
1978–79	Washington Capitals	NHL	9	0	3	3	6	—	—	—	—	—
1978–79	Hershey Bears	AHL	56	16	15	31	21	4	1	1	2	2
1979–80	Hershey Bears	AHL	71	34	27	61	39	16	5	9	14	13
1980–81	Hershey Bears	AHL	71	23	24	47	16	8	0	3	3	0
1981–82	Hershey Bears	AHL	74	16	23	39	23	5	4	1	5	0
1982–83	Hershey Bears	AHL	21	4	2	6	4	—	—	—	—	—
AHL totals			343	115	111	226	129	33	10	14	24	15
NHL totals			27	3	6	9	12	—	—	—	—	—
