= 1977 WHA amateur draft =

General information
- Date: June 16, 1977

Overview
- 90 total selections in 10 rounds
- First selection: (Canada) Scott Campbell; Selected by: Houston Aeros

The 1977 WHA amateur draft was the fifth and final draft held by the World Hockey Association.

== Selections by round ==
Below are listed the selections in the 1977 WHA amateur draft.

Selections by round

Round 1 | Round 2 | Round 3 | Round 4 | Round 5 | Round 6 | Round 7 | Round 8 | Round 9 | Round 10

=== Round 1 ===
#	Player	Nationality	WHA team	College/junior/club team
1	Scott Campbell (D)	Canada	Houston Aeros (from Birmingham)	London Knights (OHA)
2	Barry Beck (D)	Canada	Calgary Cowboys	New Westminster Bruins (WCHL)
3	Ron Duguay (C)	Canada	Winnipeg Jets (from Edmonton)	Sudbury Wolves (OHA)
4	Mike Crombeen (F)	Canada	Edmonton Oilers (from New England)	Kingston Canadians (OHA)
5	Doug Wilson (D)	Canada	Indianapolis Racers	Ottawa 67's (OHA)
6	Rod Langway (D)	United States	Birmingham Bulls (from Cincinnati)	University of New Hampshire (ECAC)
7	Jere Gillis (F)	United States	Cincinnati Stingers (from San Diego)	Sherbrooke Castors (QMJHL)
8	Miles Zaharko (D)	Canada	Winnipeg Jets	New Westminster Bruins (WCHL)
9	Lucien DeBlois (F)	Canada	Quebec Nordiques	Sorel Black Hawks (QMJHL)
10	Dwight Foster (F)	Canada	Houston Aeros	Kitchener Rangers (OHA)
11	Ron Areshenkoff (C)	Canada	Edmonton Oilers (from New England)	Medicine Hat Tigers (WCHL)

=== Round 2 ===
#	Player	Nationality	WHA team	College/junior/club team
12	Brad Maxwell (D)	Canada	Birmingham Bulls	New Westminster Bruins (WCHL)
13	Tom Gorence (RW)	United States	Calgary Cowboys	University of Minnesota (WCHA)
14	John Anderson (LW)	Canada	Quebec Nordiques (from Edmonton)	Toronto Marlboros (OHA)
15	Moe Robinson (D)	Canada	New England Whalers	Kingston Canadians (OHA)
16	Wayne Ramsey (D)	Canada	Indianapolis Racers	Brandon Wheat Kings (WCHL)
17	Doug Berry (C)	Canada	Calgary Cowboys (from Cincinnati)	University of Denver (WCHA)
18	Dave Morrow (D)	Canada	Cincinnati Stingers (from San Diego)	Calgary Centennials (WCHL)
19	Randy Pierce (RW)	Canada	New England Whalers (from Winnipeg)	Sudbury Wolves (OHA)
20	Benoit Gosselin (LW)	Canada	Quebec Nordiques	Trois-Rivieres Draveurs (QMJHL)
21	Dave Semenko (LW)	Canada	Houston Aeros	Brandon Wheat Kings (WCHL)

=== Round 3 ===
#	Player	Nationality	WHA team	College/junior/club team
22	Mark Johnson (F)	United States	Birmingham Bulls	University of Wisconsin (WCHA)
23	John Baby (D)	Canada	New England Whalers (from Calgary)	Sudbury Wolves (OHA)
24	Kim Davis (C)	Canada	Edmonton Oilers	Flin Flon Bombers (WCHL)
25	Floyd Lahache (D)	Canada	Cincinnati Stingers (from New England)	Sherbrooke Castors (QMJHL)
26	Bob Gladney (D)	Canada	Cincinnati Stingers (from Indianapolis)	Oshawa Generals (OHA)
27	Colin Ahern (C)	United States	Cincinnati Stingers	Providence College (ECAC)
28	Mark Lofthouse (RW)	Canada	Winnipeg Jets	New Westminster Bruins (WCHL)
29	Tom Roulston (RW)	Canada	Quebec Nordiques	Winnipeg Monarchs (WCHL)
30	Glen Hanlon (G)	Canada	Houston Aeros	Brandon Wheat Kings (WCHL)

=== Round 4 ===
#	Player	Nationality	WHA team	College/junior/club team
31	Norm Dupont (LW)	Canada	Birmingham Bulls	Montreal Juniors (QMJHL)
32	Steve Stoyanovich (C)	Canada	Calgary Cowboys	R.P.I. (ECAC)
33	Neil LaBatte (D)	Canada	Edmonton Oilers	Toronto Marlboros (OHA)
34	Dan Clark (D)	Canada	Edmonton Oilers (from New England)	Kamloops Chiefs (WCHL)
35	Dale McCourt (F)	Canada	Indianapolis Racers	St. Catharines Fincups (OHA)
36	Jeff Allan (D)	Canada	Cincinnati Stingers	Hull Olympiques (QMJHL)
37	Don Laurence (C)	Canada	Winnipeg Jets	Kitchener Rangers (OHA)
38	Robert Picard (D)	Canada	Quebec Nordiques	Montreal Juniors (QMJHL)
39	Reg Kerr (D)	Canada	Houston Aeros	Kamloops Chiefs (WCHL)

=== Round 5 ===
#	Player	Nationality	WHA team	College/junior/club team
40	Steve Baker (G)	United States	Birmingham Bulls	Union College (ECAC-2)
41	Perry Schnarr (LW)	Canada	Calgary Cowboys	University of Denver (WCHA)
42	Rocky Saganiuk (RW)	Canada	Edmonton Oilers	Lethbridge Broncos (WCHL)
43	Brian Hill (RW)	Austria	New England Whalers	Medicine Hat Tigers (WCHL)
44	Mike Bossy (F)	Canada	Indianapolis Racers	Laval National (QMJHL)
45	Jim Trainor (D)	United States	Cincinnati Stingers	Harvard University (ECAC)
46	Bill Stewart (D)	Canada	Winnipeg Jets	Niagara Falls Flyers (OHA)
47	Alain Cote (LW)	Canada	Quebec Nordiques	Chicoutimi Sagueneens (QMJHL)
48	Kevin McCarthy (D)	Canada	Houston Aeros	Winnipeg Monarchs (WCHL)

=== Round 6 ===
#	Player	Nationality	WHA team	College/junior/club team
49	Greg Tebbutt (D)	Canada	Birmingham Bulls	Regina Pats (WCHL)
50	Don Micheletti (W)	United States	Calgary Cowboys	University of Minnesota (WCHA)
51	Julian Baretta (G)	United States	Edmonton Oilers	University of Wisconsin (WCHA)
52	Jim Korn (D)	United States	New England Whalers	Providence College (ECAC)
53	Rick Vasko (D)	Canada	Indianapolis Racers	Peterborough Petes (OHA)
54	Bill Himmelright (D)	United States	Cincinnati Stingers	University of North Dakota (WCHA)
55	Ric Seiling (RW)	Canada	Winnipeg Jets	St. Catharines Fincups (OHA)
56	Yves Guillemette (G)	Canada	Quebec Nordiques	Shawinigan Dynamos (QMJHL)
57	Markus Mattsson (G)	Finland	Houston Aeros	Ilves (Liiga)

=== Round 7 ===
#	Player	Nationality	WHA team	College/junior/club team
58	Bob Suter (D)	United States	Birmingham Bulls	University of Wisconsin (WCHA)
59	Doug Butler (D)	Canada	Calgary Cowboys	St. Louis University (CCHA)
60	Dave Hoyda (LW)	Canada	Edmonton Oilers	Portland Winter Hawks (WCHL)
61	Steve Letzgus (D)	United States	Calgary Cowboys (from New England)	Michigan Tech (WCHA)
62	Brian Drumm (LW)	Canada	Indianapolis Racers	Oshawa Generals (OHA)
63	Tom Byers (W)	United States	Cincinnati Stingers	Providence College (ECAC)
64	Jim Hamilton (LW)	Canada	Winnipeg Jets	London Knights (OHA)
65	Eddy Godin (RW)	Canada	Quebec Nordiques	Quebec Remparts (QMJHL)
66	Harald Luckner (F)	Sweden	Houston Aeros	Farjestads BK (Elitserien)

=== Round 8 ===
#	Player	Nationality	WHA team	College/junior/club team
67	Curt Christopherson (D)	United States	Birmingham Bulls	Colorado College (WCHA)
68	Jack O'Callahan (D)	United States	Calgary Cowboys	Boston University (ECAC)
69	Ray Creasy (F)	Canada	Edmonton Oilers	New Westminster Bruins (WCHL)
70	Bobby Gould (F)	Canada	Calgary Cowboys (from New England)	University of New Hampshire (ECAC)
71	Bob Boileau (C)	Canada	Cincinnati Stingers	Boston University (ECAC)
72	Warren Holmes (C)	Canada	Winnipeg Jets	Ottawa 67's (OHA)
73	Pierre Lagace (C)	Canada	Quebec Nordiques	Quebec Remparts (QMJHL)
74	Matti Forss (F)	Finland	Houston Aeros	Lukko Rauma (Liiga)

=== Round 9 ===
#	Player	Nationality	WHA team	College/junior/club team
75	Jean Savard (F)	Canada	Birmingham Bulls	Quebec Remparts (QMJHL)
76	Keith Hendrickson (D)	United States	Calgary Cowboys	University of Minnesota-Duluth (WCHA)
77	Guy Lash (RW)	Canada	Edmonton Oilers	Winnipeg Monarchs (WCHL)
78	Tim Harrer (RW)	United States	Calgary Cowboys (from New England)	University of Minnesota (WCHA)
79	Jim Craig (G)	United States	Cincinnati Stingers	Boston University (ECAC)
80	Mike Keating (LW)	Canada	Winnipeg Jets	St. Catharines Fincups (OHA)
81	Dan Chicoine (RW)	Canada	Quebec Nordiques	Sherbrooke Castors (QMJHL)
82	Mike Dwyer (LW)	Canada	Houston Aeros	Niagara Falls Flyers (OHA)

=== Round 10 ===
#	Player	Nationality	WHA team	College/junior/club team
83	Ken Linseman (F)	Canada	Birmingham Bulls	Kingston Canadians (OHA)
84	Bruce Crowder (F)	Canada	Calgary Cowboys	University of New Hampshire (ECAC)
85	Owen Lloyd (D)	Canada	Edmonton Oilers	Medicine Hat Tigers (WCHL)
86	Mark Miller (F)	Canada	Calgary Cowboys (from New England)	University of Michigan (WCHA)
87	David Kelley (D)	United States	Cincinnati Stingers	Princeton University (ECAC)
88	Murray Bannerman (G)	Canada	Winnipeg Jets	Victoria Cougars (WCHL)
89	Roland Cloutier (C)	Canada	Quebec Nordiques	Trois-Rivieres Draveurs (QMJHL)
90	Dave Parro (G)	Canada	Houston Aeros	Saskatoon Blades (WCHL)

== Draftees based on nationality ==
Rank	Country	Amount
	North America	86
1	Canada	66
2	United States	20
	Europe	4
3	Finland	2
4	Austria	1
5	Sweden	1

== See also ==
- 1977 NHL amateur draft
- 1977–78 WHA season

Preceded by 1976 WHA amateur draft	WHA draft 1977	Succeeded by Final
