= Brian McGregor =

Canadian ice hockey player

- Born: July 11, 1957 (age 68) Canada
- Height: 6 ft 3 in (191 cm)
- Weight: 180 lb (82 kg; 12 st 12 lb)
- Position: Centre
- Shot: Right
- Played for: AHL; Rochester Americans; Binghamton Dusters; Springfield Indians; Binghamton Whalers; IHL; Grand Rapids Owls
- NHL draft: 70th overall, 1977; Boston Bruins
- Playing career: 1977–1982

Brian McGregor (born July 11, 1957) is a Canadian retired professional ice hockey player. He was selected by the Boston Bruins in the fourth round (70th overall) of the 1977 NHL entry draft.

McGregor played major junior hockey with the Saskatoon Blades before beginning his professional career in 1977 with the Rochester Americans of the American Hockey League. He played five seasons in the minor leagues before retiring from professional hockey following the 1981–82 AHL season.
