= 1977 NHL amateur draft =

1977 North American ice hockey draft

General information
- Date: June 14, 1977
- Location: Mount Royal Hotel; Montreal, Quebec, Canada

Overview
- 185 total selections in 17 rounds
- First selection: (Canada) Dale McCourt (Detroit Red Wings)
- Hall of Famers: 3: D Doug Wilson; RW Mike Bossy; D Rod Langway

The 1977 NHL amateur draft was the 15th draft for the National Hockey League. It was held at the Mount Royal Hotel in Montreal. It was notable for the inclusion of players being drafted at 20 years of age.

This was the only draft in which the Cleveland Barons as a distinctive franchise drafted, as they would fold prior to the 1978 draft.

The last active player in the NHL from this draft class was Gordie Roberts, who played his last NHL game in the 1993–94 season.

== Selections by round ==
Below are listed the selections in the 1977 NHL amateur draft.

= NHL All-Star team ·	= NHL All-Star (Note: Players are identified as an All-Star if they were selected for the All-Star game at any time in their career.) ·	= NHL All-Star and NHL All-Star team ·	= Hall of Famers

Club teams are located in North America unless otherwise noted.

=== Round one ===
#	Player	Nationality	NHL team	College/junior/club team
1	Dale McCourt (C)	Canada	Detroit Red Wings	St. Catharines Fincups (OHA)
2	Barry Beck (D)	Canada	Colorado Rockies	New Westminster Bruins (WCHL)
3	Robert Picard (D)	Canada	Washington Capitals	Montreal Juniors (QMJHL)
4	Jere Gillis (LW)	Canada	Vancouver Canucks	Sherbrooke Castors (QMJHL)
5	Mike Crombeen (RW)	Canada	Cleveland Barons	Kingston Canadians (OHA)
6	Doug Wilson (D)	Canada	Chicago Black Hawks	Ottawa 67's (OHA)
7	Brad Maxwell (D)	Canada	Minnesota North Stars	New Westminster Bruins (WCHL)
8	Lucien DeBlois (RW)	Canada	New York Rangers (from NY Rangers via St. Louis)^{1}	Sorel Éperviers (QMJHL)
9	Scott Campbell (D)	Canada	St. Louis Blues	London Knights (OHA)
10	Mark Napier (RW)	Canada	Montreal Canadiens (from Atlanta)^{2}	Birmingham Bulls (WHA)
11	John Anderson (RW)	Canada	Toronto Maple Leafs	Toronto Marlboros (OHA)
12	Trevor Johansen (D)	Canada	Toronto Maple Leafs (from Pittsburgh)^{3}	Toronto Marlboros (OHA)
13	Ron Duguay (C)	Canada	New York Rangers (from Los Angeles)^{4}	Sudbury Wolves (OHA)
14	Ric Seiling (RW)	Canada	Buffalo Sabres	St. Catharines Fincups (OHA)
15	Mike Bossy (RW)	Canada	New York Islanders	Laval National (QMJHL)
16	Dwight Foster (RW)	Canada	Boston Bruins	Kitchener Rangers (OHA)
17	Kevin McCarthy (D)	Canada	Philadelphia Flyers	Winnipeg Monarchs (WCHL)
18	Norm Dupont (LW)	Canada	Montreal Canadiens	Montreal Juniors (QMJHL)

1. The New York Rangers' first-round pick was re-acquired as the result of a trade on October 30, 1975 that sent Derek Sanderson to St. Louis in exchange for this pick.
  St. Louis previously acquired this pick as the result of a trade on August 29, 1974 that sent Greg Polis to the Rangers in exchange for Larry Sacharuk and this pick.
2. The Atlanta Flames' first-round pick went to the Montreal Canadiens as the result of a trade on May 15, 1973 that sent California's and Montreal's first-round picks both in 1973 and Atlanta's second-round pick in 1973 to Atlanta in exchange for a first-round pick in the 1973, second-round pick in 1978 and this pick.
3. The Pittsburgh Penguins' first-round pick went to the Toronto Maple Leafs as the result of a trade on September 13, 1974 that sent Rick Kehoe to Pittsburgh in exchange for Blaine Stoughton and this pick.
4. The Los Angeles Kings' first-round pick went to the New York Rangers as the result of a trade on February 14, 1974 that sent Gene Carr to Los Angeles in exchange for this pick.

=== Round two ===
#	Player	Nationality	NHL team	College/junior/club team
19	Jean Savard (C)	Canada	Chicago Black Hawks (from Detroit)^{1}	Quebec Remparts (QMJHL)
20	Miles Zaharko (D)	Canada	Atlanta Flames (from Kansas City)^{2}	New Westminster Bruins (WCHL)
21	Mark Lofthouse (RW)	Canada	Washington Capitals	New Westminster Bruins (WCHL)
22	Jeff Bandura (D)	Canada	Vancouver Canucks	Portland Winter Hawks (WCHL)
23	Dan Chicoine (RW)	Canada	Cleveland Barons	Sherbrooke Castors (QMJHL)
24	Bob Gladney (D)	Canada	Toronto Maple Leafs (from Chicago)^{3}	Oshawa Generals (OHA)
25	Dave Semenko (LW)	Canada	Minnesota North Stars	Brandon Wheat Kings (WCHL)
26	Mike Keating (LW)	Canada	New York Rangers	St. Catharines Fincups (OMJHL)
27	Neil Labatte (D)	Canada	St. Louis Blues	Toronto Marlboros (OMJHL)
28	Don Laurence (C)	Canada	Atlanta Flames	Kitchener Rangers (OMJHL)
29	Rocky Saganiuk (RW)	Canada	Toronto Maple Leafs	Lethbridge Broncos (WCHL)
30	Jim Hamilton (RW)	Canada	Pittsburgh Penguins	London Knights (OMJHL)
31	Brian Hill (RW)	Canada	Atlanta Flames (from Los Angeles via Vancouver)^{4}	Medicine Hat Tigers (WCHL)
32	Ron Areshenkoff (C)	Canada	Buffalo Sabres	Medicine Hat Tigers (WCHL)
33	John Tonelli (C)	Canada	New York Islanders	Houston Aeros (WHA)
34	Dave Parro (G)	Canada	Boston Bruins	Saskatoon Blades (WCHL)
35	Tom Gorence (RW)	United States	Philadelphia Flyers	University of Minnesota (WCHA)
36	Rod Langway (D)	United States	Montreal Canadiens	University of New Hampshire (ECAC)

1. The Detroit Red Wings' second-round pick went to the Chicago Black Hawks as the result of a trade on November 20, 1975 that sent the rights to Jean-Paul LeBlanc to Detroit in exchange for this pick.
2. The Kansas City Scouts' second-round pick went to the Atlanta Flames as the result of a trade on October 13, 1975 that sent Buster Harvey to Kansas City in exchange for Richard Lemieux and this pick.
3. The Chicago Black Hawks' second-round pick went to the Toronto Maple Leafs as the result of a trade on September 28, 1976 that sent the rights to Jim Harrison to Chicago in exchange for this pick.
4. The Los Angeles Kings' second-round pick went to the Atlanta Flames as the result of a trade on December 2, 1976 that sent Larry Carriere and Hilliard Graves to Vancouver in exchange for John Gould and this pick.
  Vancouver previously acquired this pick as the result of a trade on January 14, 1976 that sent Ab DeMarco Jr. to Los Angeles in exchange for this pick.

=== Round three ===
#	Player	Nationality	NHL team	College/junior/club team
37	Rick Vasko (D)	Canada	Detroit Red Wings	Peterborough Petes (OMJHL)
38	Doug Berry (C)	Canada	Colorado Rockies	University of Denver (WCHA)
39	Eddy Godin (RW)	Canada	Washington Capitals	Quebec Remparts (QMJHL)
40	Glen Hanlon (G)	Canada	Vancouver Canucks	Brandon Wheat Kings (WCHL)
41	Reg Kerr (LW)	Canada	Cleveland Barons (from California via St. Louis)^{1}	Kamloops Chiefs (WCHL)
42	Guy Lash (RW)	Canada	Cleveland Barons (from Chicago)^{2}	Winnipeg Monarchs (WCHL)
43	Alain Cote (LW)	Canada	Montreal Canadiens (from Minnesota)^{3}	Chicoutimi Saguenéens (QMJHL)
44	Steve Baker (G)	United States	New York Rangers	Union College (ECAC)
45	Tom Roulston (C)	Canada	St. Louis Blues	Winnipeg Monarchs (WCHL)
46	Pierre Lagace (LW)	Canada	Montreal Canadiens (from Atlanta)^{4}	Quebec Remparts (QMJHL)
47	Randy Pierce (RW)	Canada	Colorado Rockies (from Toronto)^{5}	Sudbury Wolves (OMJHL)
48	Kim Davis (C)	Canada	Pittsburgh Penguins	Flin Flon Bombers (WCHL)
49	Moe Robinson (D)	Canada	Montreal Canadiens (from Los Angeles)^{6}	Kingston Canadians (OMJHL)
50	Hector Marini (RW)	Canada	New York Islanders (from Buffalo)^{7}	Sudbury Wolves(OMJHL)
51	Bruce Andres (RW)	Canada	New York Islanders	New Westminster Bruins (WCHL)
52	Mike Forbes (D)	Canada	Boston Bruins	St. Catharines Fincups (OMJHL)
53	Dave Hoyda (LW)	Canada	Philadelphia Flyers	Portland Winter Hawks (WCHL)
54	Gordie Roberts (D)	United States	Montreal Canadiens	New England Whalers (WHA)

1. The Cleveland Barons' third-round pick was re-acquired as the result of a trade on March 9, 1976 that sent Dave Hrechkosy to St. Louis in exchange for a fifth-round pick in 1976 and this pick.
  St. Louis previously acquired this pick as the result of a trade on November 24, 1975 that sent Wayne Merrick to the California Golden Seals in exchange for Larry Patey and this pick. The Golden Seals relocated to become the Cleveland Barons for the 1976–77 NHL season.
2. The Chicago Black Hawks' third-round pick went to the Cleveland Barons as the result of a trade on June 1, 1975 that sent Joey Johnston to California in exchange for Jim Pappin and this pick.
3. The Minnesota North Stars' third-round pick went to the Montreal Canadiens as the result of a trade on July 9, 1975 that sent Glen Sather to Minnesota in exchange for cash and this pick.
4. The Atlanta Flames' third-round pick went to the Montreal Canadiens as the result of a trade on May 29, 1973 that sent Bob Murray and a fourth-round pick in 1977 to Atlanta in exchange for a fourth-round pick in 1977 and this pick.
5. The Toronto Maple Leafs' third-round pick went to the Colorado Rockies as the result of a trade on March 8, 1977 that sent Tracy Pratt to Toronto in exchange for this pick.
6. The Los Angeles Kings' third-round pick went to the Montreal Canadiens as the result of a trade on June 12, 1976 that sent Glenn Goldup and a third-round pick in 1978 to Los Angeles in exchange for a first-round pick in 1978 and this pick.
7. The Buffalo Sabres' third-round pick went to the New York Islanders as the result of a trade on February 19, 1975 that sent the rights to Gerry Desjardins to Buffalo in exchange for the rights to Garry Lariviere and this pick.

=== Round four ===
#	Player	Nationality	NHL team	College/junior/club team
55	John Hilworth (D)	Canada	Detroit Red Wings	Medicine Hat Tigers (WCHL)
56	Dave Morrow (D)	Canada	Vancouver Canucks (from Colorado)^{1}	Calgary Wranglers (WCHL)
57	Nelson Burton (LW)	Canada	Washington Capitals	Quebec Remparts (QMJHL)
58	Murray Bannerman (G)	Canada	Vancouver Canucks	Victoria Cougars (WCHL)
59	John Baby (D)	Canada	Cleveland Barons	Sudbury Wolves (OMJHL)
60	Randy Ireland (G)	Canada	Chicago Black Hawks	Portland Winter Hawks (WCHL)
61	Kevin McCloskey (D)	Canada	Minnesota North Stars	Calgary Wranglers (WCHL)
62	Mario Marois (D)	Canada	New York Rangers	Quebec Remparts (QMJHL)
63	Tony Currie (RW)	Canada	St. Louis Blues	Portland Winter Hawks (WCHL)
64	Robert Holland (G)	Canada	Montreal Canadiens (from Atlanta)^{2}	Montreal Juniors (QMJHL)
65	Dan Eastman (RW)	Canada	Toronto Maple Leafs	London Knights (OMJHL)
66	Mark Johnson (C)	United States	Pittsburgh Penguins	University of Wisconsin (WCHA)
67	Yves Guillemette (G)	Canada	Philadelphia Flyers (from Los Angeles)^{3}	Shawinigan Dynamos (QMJHL)
68	Bill Stewart (D)	Canada	Buffalo Sabres	Niagara Falls Flyers (OMJHL)
69	Steve Stoyanovich (C)	Canada	New York Islanders	Rensselaer Polytechnic Institute (ECAC)
70	Brian McGregor (RW)	Canada	Boston Bruins	Saskatoon Blades (WCHL)
71	Rene Hamelin (LW)	Canada	Philadelphia Flyers	Shawinigan Dynamos (QMJHL)
72	Jim Craig (G)	United States	Atlanta Flames (from Montreal)^{4}	Boston University (ECAC)

1. The Colorado Rockies' fourth-round pick went to the Vancouver Canucks as the result of a trade on September 12, 1976 that sent Vancouver's fifth-round pick in 1978 to Colorado in exchange for this pick.
2. The Atlanta Flames' fourth-round pick went to the Montreal Canadiens as the result of a trade on May 29, 1973 that sent Bob Murray and a fourth-round pick in 1977 to Atlanta in exchange for a third-round pick in 1977 and this pick.
3. The Los Angeles Kings' fourth-round pick went to the Philadelphia Flyers as the result of a trade on September 29, 1976 that sent Dave Schultz to Los Angeles in exchange for a second-round pick in 1978 and this pick.
4. The Montreal Canadiens' fourth-round pick went to the Atlanta Flames as the result of a trade on May 29, 1973 that sent a third and fourth-round pick both in 1977 to Montreal in exchange for Bob Murray and this pick.

=== Round five ===
#	Player	Nationality	NHL team	College/junior/club team
73	Jim Korn (D)	United States	Detroit Red Wings	Providence College (ECAC)
74	Mike Dwyer (LW)	Canada	Colorado Rockies	Niagara Falls Flyers (OMJHL)
75	Denis Turcotte (C)	Canada	Washington Capitals	Quebec Remparts (QMJHL)
76	Steve Hazlett (C)	Canada	Vancouver Canucks	St. Catharines Fincups (OMJHL)
77	Owen Lloyd (D)	Canada	Cleveland Barons	Medicine Hat Tigers (WCHL)
78	Gary Platt (D)	Canada	Chicago Black Hawks	Verdun Eperviers (QMJHL)
79	Bob Parent (D)	Canada	Minnesota North Stars	Kingston Canadians (OMJHL)
80	Benoit Gosselin (LW)	Canada	New York Rangers	Trois-Rivières Draveurs (QMJHL)
81	Bruce Hamilton (LW)	Canada	St. Louis Blues	Saskatoon Blades (WCHL)
82	Curt Christofferson (D)	United States	Atlanta Flames	Colorado College (WCHA)
83	John Wilson (LW)	Canada	Toronto Maple Leafs	Windsor Spitfires (OMJHL)
84	Julian Baretta (G)	Canada	Los Angeles Kings (from Pittsburgh)^{1}	University of Wisconsin (WCHA)
85	Warren Holmes (C)	Canada	Los Angeles Kings	Ottawa 67's (OMJHL)
86	Rich Sirois (G)	Canada	Buffalo Sabres	Laval National (QMJHL)
87	Markus Mattsson (G)	Finland	New York Islanders	Tampere Ilves (Finland)
88	Doug Butler (D)	Canada	Boston Bruins	Saint Louis University (CCHA)
89	Dan Clark (D)	Canada	Philadelphia Flyers	Kamloops Chiefs (WCHL)
90	Gaetan Rochette (LW)	Canada	Montreal Canadiens	Shawinigan Dynamos (QMJHL)

1. The Pittsburgh Penguins' fifth-round pick went to the Los Angeles Kings as the result of a trade on October 18, 1976 that sent Mike Corrigan to Pittsburgh in exchange for this pick.

=== Round six ===
#	Player	Nationality	NHL team	College/junior/club team
91	Jim Baxter (G)	Canada	Detroit Red Wings	Union College (ECAC)
92	Dan Lempe (C)	United States	Colorado Rockies	University of Minnesota Duluth (WCHA)
93	Perry Schnarr (RW)	Canada	Washington Capitals	University of Denver (WCHA)
94	Brian Drumm (LW)	Canada	Vancouver Canucks	Peterborough Petes (OMJHL)
95	Jeff Allan (D)	Canada	Cleveland Barons	Hull Olympiques (QMJHL)
96	Jack O'Callahan (D)	United States	Chicago Black Hawks	Boston University (ECAC)
97	Jamie Gallimore (RW)	Canada	Minnesota North Stars	Kamloops Chiefs (WCHL)
98	John Bethel (LW)	Canada	New York Rangers	Boston University (ECAC)
99	Gary McMonagle (C)	Canada	St. Louis Blues	Peterborough Petes (OMJHL)
100	Bernard Harbec (C)	Canada	Atlanta Flames	Laval National (QMJHL)
101	Roy Sommer (LW)	United States	Toronto Maple Leafs	Calgary Wranglers (WCHL)
102	Greg Millen (G)	Canada	Pittsburgh Penguins	Peterborough Petes (OMJHL)
103	Randy Rudnyk (RW)	Canada	Los Angeles Kings	New Westminster Bruins (WCHL)
104	Wayne Ramsey (D)	Canada	Buffalo Sabres	Brandon Wheat Kings (WCHL)
105	Steve Letzgus (D)	United States	New York Islanders	Michigan Technological University (WCHA)
106	Keith Johnson (D)	Canada	Boston Bruins	Saskatoon Blades (WCHL)
107	Alain Chaput (C)	Canada	Philadelphia Flyers	Verdun Eperviers (QMJHL)
108	Bill Himmelright (D)	United States	Montreal Canadiens	University of North Dakota (WCHA)

=== Round seven ===
#	Player	Nationality	NHL team	College/junior/club team
109	Randy Wilson (LW)	United States	Detroit Red Wings	Providence College (ECAC)
110	Rick Doyle (LW)	Canada	Colorado Rockies	London Knights (OMJHL)
111	Rollie Boutin (G)	Canada	Washington Capitals	Lethbridge Broncos (WCHL)
112	Ray Creasy (C)	Canada	Vancouver Canucks	New Westminster Bruins (WCHL)
113	Mark Toffolo (D)	United States	Cleveland Barons	Chicoutimi Saguenéens (QMJHL)
114	Floyd Lahache (D)	Canada	Chicago Black Hawks	Sherbrooke Castors(QMJHL)
115	Jean-Pierre Sanvido (G)	Canada	Minnesota North Stars	Trois-Rivières Draveurs (QMJHL)
116	Bob Sullivan (LW)	Canada	New York Rangers	Chicoutimi Saguenéens (QMJHL)
117	Matti Forss (C)	Finland	St. Louis Blues	Rauma (Finland)
118	Bob Gould (RW)	Canada	Atlanta Flames	University of New Hampshire (ECAC)
119	Lynn Jorgenson (LW)	Canada	Toronto Maple Leafs	Toronto Marlboros (OMJHL)
120	Bob Suter (D)	United States	Los Angeles Kings	University of Wisconsin (WCHA)
121	Harald Luckner (C)	Sweden	New York Islanders	Karlstad (Sweden)
122	Ralph Cox (RW)	United States	Boston Bruins	University of New Hampshire (ECAC)
123	Richard Dalpe (C)	Canada	Philadelphia Flyers	Trois-Rivières Draveurs (QMJHL)
124	Richard Sevigny (G)	Canada	Montreal Canadiens	Sherbrooke Castors (QMJHL)

=== Round eight ===
#	Player	Nationality	NHL team	College/junior/club team
125	Raymond Roy (C)	United States	Detroit Red Wings	Sherbrooke Castors (QMJHL)
126	Joe Contini (C)	Canada	Colorado Rockies	St. Catharines Fincups (OMJHL)
127	Brent Tremblay (D)	Canada	Washington Capitals	Trois-Rivières Draveurs (QMJHL)
128	Grant Eakin (LW)	Canada	Cleveland Barons	Lethbridge Broncos (WCHL)
129	Jeff Geiger (D)	Canada	Chicago Black Hawks	Ottawa 67's (OMJHL)
130	Greg Tebbutt (D)	Canada	Minnesota North Stars	Regina Pats (WCHL)
131	Lance Nethery (C)	Canada	New York Rangers	Cornell University (ECAC)
132	Raimo Hirvonen (D)	Finland	St. Louis Blues	Helsinki IFK (Finland)
133	Jim Bennett (LW)	United States	Atlanta Flames	Brown University (ECAC)
134	Kevin Howe (D)	Canada	Toronto Maple Leafs	Sault Ste. Marie Greyhounds (OMJHL)
135	Pete Peeters (G)	Canada	Philadelphia Flyers (from Pittsburgh)^{1}	Medicine Hat Tigers (WCHL)
136	Clint Eccles (LW)	Canada	Philadelphia Flyers (from Buffalo)^{2}	Kamloops Chiefs (WCHL)
137	Keith Hendrickson (D)	United States	Montreal Canadiens (from the Islanders)^{3}	University of Minnesota-Duluth (WCHA)
138	Mario Claude (D)	Canada	Boston Bruins	Sherbrooke Castors(QMJHL)
139	Mike Greeder (D)	United States	Philadelphia Flyers	St. Paul Vulcans (MWJHL)
140	Michael Reilly (RW)	United States	Montreal Canadiens	Colorado College (WCHA)

1. The Pittsburgh Penguins' eighth-round pick went to the Philadelphia Flyers as the result of a trade on March 8, 1976 that sent Bobby Taylor and Ed Van Impe to Pittsburgh in exchange for Gary Inness and future considerations. The future considerations became Pittsburgh's ninth-round, tenth-round, eleventh-round and twelfth-round picks in 1977 NHL amateur draft and this pick.
2. The Buffalo Sabres' eighth-round pick went to the Philadelphia Flyers as the result of a trade on June 14, 1977 that sent cash to Buffalo in exchange for this pick.
3. The New York Islanders' eighth-round pick went to the Montreal Canadiens as the result of a trade on June 14, 1977 that sent cash to the Islanders in exchange for this pick.

=== Round nine ===
#	Player	Nationality	NHL team	College/junior/club team
141	Kip Churchill (C)	Canada	Detroit Red Wings	Union College (ECAC)
142	Jack Hughes (D)	United States	Colorado Rockies	Harvard University (ECAC)
143	Don Micheletti (LW)	United States	Washington Capitals	University of Minnesota (WCHA)
144	Steve Ough (D)	Canada	Chicago Black Hawks	Laval National (QMJHL)
145	Keith Hanson (D)	United States	Minnesota North Stars	Austin Mavericks (MidJHL)
146	Alex Jeans (C)	Canada	New York Rangers	University of Toronto (CIAU)
147	Bjorn Olsson (D)	Sweden	St. Louis Blues	Karlstad (Sweden)
148	Tim Harrer (RW)	United States	Atlanta Flames	Shattuck's St. Marys (WCHA)
149	Ray Robertson (D)	Canada	Toronto Maple Leafs	St. Lawrence University (ECAC)
150	Tom Bauer (C)	United States	Philadelphia Flyers (from Pittsburgh)^{1}	Orange County Hockey Club (NAPHL)
151	Michel Bauman (LW)	Canada	Philadelphia Flyers (from Buffalo)^{2}	Hull Olympiques (QMJHL)
152	Barry Borrett (G)	Canada	Montreal Canadiens (from the Islanders)^{3}	Cornwall Royals (QMJHL)
153	Bruce Crowder (RW)	Canada	Philadelphia Flyers	University of New Hampshire (ECAC)
154	Sid Tanchak (C)	Canada	Montreal Canadiens	Clarkson University (ECAC)

1. The Pittsburgh Penguins' ninth-round pick went to the Philadelphia Flyers as the result of a trade on March 8, 1976 that sent Bobby Taylor and Ed Van Impe to Pittsburgh in exchange for Gary Inness and future considerations. The future considerations became Pittsburgh's eighth-round, tenth-round, eleventh-round and twelfth-round picks in 1977 NHL Amateur Draft and this pick.
2. The Buffalo Sabres' ninth-round pick went to the Philadelphia Flyers as the result of a trade on June 14, 1977 that sent cash to Buffalo in exchange for this pick.
3. The New York Islanders' ninth-round pick went to the Montreal Canadiens as the result of a trade on June 14, 1977 that sent cash to the Islanders in exchange for this pick.

=== Round ten ===
#	Player	Nationality	NHL team	College/junior/club team
155	Lance Gatoni (D)	Canada	Detroit Red Wings	University of Toronto (CIAU)
156	Archie Henderson (RW)	Canada	Washington Capitals	Victoria Cougars (WCHL)
157	Pete Raps (LW)	Canada	New York Rangers	Western Michigan University (CCHA)
158	Rob Nicholson (D)	United States	Philadelphia Flyers (from Pittsburgh)^{1}	St. Paul Vulcans (MWJHL)
159	Dave Isherwood (C)	Canada	Philadelphia Flyers (from Buffalo)^{2}	Winnipeg Monarchs (WCHL)
160	Mark Holden (G)	United States	Montreal Canadiens (from the Islanders)^{3}	Brown University (ECAC)
161	Steve Jones (G)	Canada	Philadelphia Flyers	Ohio State University (CCHA)
162	Craig Laughlin (RW)	Canada	Montreal Canadiens	Clarkson University (ECAC)

1. The Pittsburgh Penguins' tenth-round pick went to the Philadelphia Flyers as the result of a trade on March 8, 1976 that sent Bobby Taylor and Ed Van Impe to Pittsburgh in exchange for Gary Inness and future considerations. The future considerations became Pittsburgh's eighth-round, ninth-round, eleventh-round and twelfth-round picks in 1977 NHL amateur draft and this pick.
2. The Buffalo Sabres' tenth-round pick went to the Philadelphia Flyers as the result of a trade on June 14, 1977 that sent cash to Buffalo in exchange for this pick.
3. The New York Islanders' tenth-round pick went to the Montreal Canadiens as the result of a trade on June 14, 1977 that sent cash to the Islanders in exchange for this pick.

=== Round eleven ===
#	Player	Nationality	NHL team	College/junior/club team
163	Robert Plumb (LW)	Canada	Detroit Red Wings	Kingston Canadians (OMJHL)
164	Mike Brown (RW)	United States	New York Rangers	Western Michigan University (CCHA)
165	Jim Trainor (D)	United States	Philadelphia Flyers (from Pittsburgh)^{1}	Harvard University (ECAC)
166	Barry Duench (C)	Canada	Philadelphia Flyers (from Buffalo)^{2}	Kitchener Rangers (OMJHL)
167	Dan Poulin (D)	Canada	Montreal Canadiens (from the Islanders)^{3}	Chicoutimi Saguenéens (QMJHL)
168	Rod McNair (D)	Canada	Philadelphia Flyers	Ohio State University (CCHA)
169	Tom McDonell (C)	Canada	Montreal Canadiens	Ottawa 67's (OMJHL)

1. The Pittsburgh Penguins' eleventh-round pick went to the Philadelphia Flyers as the result of a trade on March 8, 1976 that sent Bobby Taylor and Ed Van Impe to Pittsburgh in exchange for Gary Inness and future considerations. The future considerations became Pittsburgh's eighth-round, ninth-round, tenth-round and twelfth-round picks in 1977 NHL amateur draft and this pick.
2. The Buffalo Sabres' eleventh-round pick went to the Philadelphia Flyers as the result of a trade on June 14, 1977 that sent cash to Buffalo in exchange for this pick.
3. The New York Islanders' eleventh-round pick went to the Montreal Canadiens as the result of a trade on June 14, 1977 that sent cash to the Islanders in exchange for this pick.

=== Round twelve ===
#	Player	Nationality	NHL team	College/junior/club team
170	Alain Belanger (LW)	Canada	Detroit Red Wings	Trois-Rivières Draveurs (QMJHL)
171	Mark Miller (LW)	Canada	New York Rangers	University of Michigan (WCHA)
172	Mike Laycock (G)	Canada	Philadelphia Flyers (from Pittsburgh)^{1}	Brown University (ECAC)
173	Cary Farelli (RW)	Canada	Montreal Canadiens (from the Islanders)^{2}	Toronto Marlboros (OMJHL)
174	Carey Walker (G)	Canada	Montreal Canadiens	New Westminster Bruins (WCHL)

1. The Pittsburgh Penguins' twelfth-round pick went to the Philadelphia Flyers as the result of a trade on March 8, 1976 that sent Bobby Taylor and Ed Van Impe to Pittsburgh in exchange for Gary Inness and future considerations. The future considerations became Pittsburgh's eighth-round, ninth-round, tenth-round and eleventh-round picks in 1977 NHL amateur draft and this pick.
2. The New York Islanders' twelfth-round pick went to the Montreal Canadiens as the result of a trade on June 14, 1977 that sent cash to the Islanders in exchange for this pick.

=== Round thirteen ===
#	Player	Nationality	NHL team	College/junior/club team
175	Dean Willers (RW)	United Kingdom	Detroit Red Wings	Union College (ECAC)
176	Mark Wells (C)	United States	Montreal Canadiens (from the Islanders)^{1}	Bowling Green University (CCHA)
177	Stan Palmer (D)	United States	Montreal Canadiens	University of Minnesota-Duluth (WCHA)

1. The New York Islanders' thirteenth-round pick went to the Montreal Canadiens as the result of a trade on June 14, 1977 that sent cash to the Islanders in exchange for this pick.

=== Round fourteen ===
#	Player	Nationality	NHL team	College/junior/club team
178	Roland Cloutier (C)	Canada	Detroit Red Wings	Trois-Rivières Draveurs (QMJHL)
179	Jean Belisle (G)	Canada	Montreal Canadiens (from the Islanders)^{1}	Chicoutimi Saguenéens (QMJHL)
180	Bob Daly (G)	Canada	Montreal Canadiens	Ottawa 67's (OMJHL)

1. The New York Islanders' thirteenth-round pick went to the Montreal Canadiens as the result of a trade on June 14, 1977 that sent cash to the Islanders in exchange for this pick.

=== Round fifteen ===
#	Player	Nationality	NHL team	College/junior/club team
181	Ed Hill (RW)	United States	Detroit Red Wings	University of Vermont (ECAC)
182	Bob Boileau (RW)	Canada	Montreal Canadiens (from the Islanders)^{1}	Boston University (ECAC)
183	John Costello (C)	United States	Montreal Canadiens	University of Massachusetts Lowell (ECAC)

1. The New York Islanders' fifteenth-round pick went to the Montreal Canadiens as the result of a trade on June 14, 1977 that sent cash to the Islanders in exchange for this pick.

=== Round sixteen ===
#	Player	Nationality	NHL team	College/junior/club team
184	Val James (LW)	United States	Detroit Red Wings	Quebec Remparts (QMJHL)

=== Round seventeen ===
#	Player	Nationality	NHL team	College/junior/club team
185	Grant Morin (RW)	Canada	Detroit Red Wings	Calgary Wranglers (WCHL)

= NHL All-Star team ·	= NHL All-Star ·	= NHL All-Star and NHL All-Star team ·	= Hall of Famers

== Draftees based on nationality ==
Rank	Country	Amount
	North America	178
1	Canada	142
2	United States	36
	Europe	7
3	Finland	3
3	Sweden	3
4	United Kingdom	1

== See also ==
- 1977–78 NHL season
- 1977 WHA amateur draft
- List of NHL players
