= Neil Labatte =

Canadian ice hockey player

- Born: April 24, 1957 (age 68) Don Mills, Ontario, Canada
- Height: 6 ft 1 in (185 cm)
- Weight: 180 lb (82 kg; 12 st 12 lb)
- Position: Defence
- Shot: Left
- Played for: St. Louis Blues
- NHL draft: 27th overall, 1977; St. Louis Blues
- WHA draft: 33rd overall, 1977; Edmonton Oilers
- Playing career: 1977–1982

Neil Labatte (born April 24, 1957) is a Canadian former professional ice hockey player. He played 26 games in the National Hockey League for the St. Louis Blues during the 1978–79 and 1981–82 seasons. The rest of his career, which lasted from 1977 to 1982, was spent with the Salt Lake Golden Eagles of the Central Hockey League. Labatte was born in Don Mills, Ontario, Canada.

== Education ==
Labatte majored in mathematics from 1974 through 1976 at Brown University and played with Brown University's hockey team in 1976. He studied at the University of Utah from 1983 to 1989, receiving bachelor's and master's degrees in finance.

Labatte is also a graduate of the ICD-Rotman Directors Education Program of the Institute of Corporate Directors and University of Toronto's Rotman School of Management.

== Hockey career ==
As a youth, Labatte played in the 1970 Quebec International Pee-Wee Hockey Tournament with a minor ice hockey team from Don Mills.

Labatte was drafted 27th overall by the St. Louis Blues in the 1977 NHL amateur draft and 33rd overall by the Edmonton Oilers in the 1977 WHA Amateur Draft. He played in 26 regular season games in the NHL with St. Louis, scoring two assists. He also played in the Central Hockey League for the Salt Lake Golden Eagles. He retired in 1982 and enrolled to the University of Utah.

== Business career ==
Labatte worked in the real estate industry for over 35 years and is the founder of Global Dimension Capital, Inc., a hotel and real estate advisor formed in 2007 for the purpose of investing capital in hotel and real estate acquisitions and developments.

Labatte also served as co-chairman of the NHL Alumni Association alongside Glenn Healy.

== Career statistics ==
=== Regular season and playoffs ===
			Regular season					Playoffs
Season	Team	League	GP	G	A	Pts	PIM	GP	G	A	Pts	PIM
1974–75	Brown University	ECAC	16	9	5	14	94	—	—	—	—	—
1975–76	Brown University	ECAC	13	7	14	21	51	—	—	—	—	—
1976–77	Toronto Marlboros	OMJHL	66	21	32	55	114	6	1	0	1	4
1977–78	Salt Lake Golden Eagles	CHL	75	11	25	36	116	6	0	2	2	8
1978–79	St. Louis Blues	NHL	22	0	2	2	13	—	—	—	—	—
1978–79	Salt Lake Golden Eagles	CHL	37	2	13	15	90	—	—	—	—	—
1979–80	Salt Lake Golden Eagles	CHL	70	1	26	27	79	10	1	7	8	17
1980–81	Salt Lake Golden Eagles	CHL	55	8	18	26	55	—	—	—	—	—
1981–82	St. Louis Blues	NHL	4	0	0	0	6	—	—	—	—	—
1981–82	Salt Lake Golden Eagles	CHL	72	7	24	31	86	9	2	5	7	21
CHL totals			309	29	106	135	426	25	3	14	17	46
NHL totals			26	0	2	2	19	—	—	—	—	—
