= Raimo Hirvonen (ice hockey) =

- Born: 20 July 1957 (age 67); Sääminki, Finland
- Height: 5 ft 10 in (178 cm)
- Weight: 179 lb (81 kg; 12 st 11 lb)
- Position: Defense
- Played for: HIFK
- National team: Finland
- NHL draft: 132nd overall, 1977; St Louis Blues
- Playing career: 1976–1991

Raimo Hirvonen (born 20 July 1957) is a Finnish retired ice hockey defenseman who mainly played for HIFK. He is a two time Liiga champion.

== Career ==
In 1991 HIFK let Hirvonen play for 4 extra games so he could play his 500th game, those games were his last Liiga games. Overall he played 500 Liiga games and put up 194 points.
