= Tom Roulston =

Canadian ice hockey player

- Born: November 20, 1957 (age 68) Winnipeg, Manitoba, Canada
- Height: 6 ft 1 in (185 cm)
- Weight: 185 lb (84 kg; 13 st 3 lb)
- Position: Right wing
- Shot: Right
- Played for: Edmonton Oilers; Pittsburgh Penguins
- NHL draft: 45th overall, 1977; St. Louis Blues
- WHA draft: 29th overall, 1977; Quebec Nordiques
- Playing career: 1977–1995

Thomas Irwin Roulston (born November 20, 1957) is a Canadian former professional ice hockey right winger. He was drafted by the St. Louis Blues in the third round, 45th overall, of the 1977 NHL amateur draft. He was also drafted by the World Hockey Association's Quebec Nordiques in the 1977 WHA Amateur Draft (third round, 29th overall); however, he never played in that league.

Roulston appeared in 195 regular-season National Hockey League games with the Edmonton Oilers and Pittsburgh Penguins. He scored 47 goals and 49 assists.

== Career statistics ==
			Regular season					Playoffs
Season	Team	League	GP	G	A	Pts	PIM	GP	G	A	Pts	PIM
1975–76	Spruce Grove Mets	AJHL	5	3	1	4	4	—	—	—	—	—
1975–76	Edmonton Oil Kings	WCHL	1	0	0	0	0	—	—	—	—	—
1975–76	Winnipeg Clubs	WCHL	60	18	17	35	56	6	2	2	4	4
1976–77	Winnipeg Monarchs	WCHL	72	56	53	109	35	7	5	3	8	23
1977–78	Port Huron Flags	IHL	50	17	36	53	24	16	17	7	24	10
1977–78	Salt Lake Golden Eagles	CHL	21	2	1	3	2	—	—	—	—	—
1978–79	Dallas Black Hawks	CHL	73	26	29	55	57	9	6	6	12	11
1979–80	Houston Apollos	CHL	72	29	41	70	46	6	2	4	6	4
1980–81	Edmonton Oilers	NHL	11	1	1	2	2	—	—	—	—	—
1980–81	Wichita Wind	CHL	69	63	44	107	93	18	15	11	26	44
1981–82	Edmonton Oilers	NHL	35	11	3	14	22	5	1	0	1	2
1981–82	Wichita Wind	CHL	30	22	28	50	46	—	—	—	—	—
1982–83	Edmonton Oilers	NHL	67	19	21	40	24	16	1	2	3	0
1983–84	Edmonton Oilers	NHL	24	5	7	12	16	—	—	—	—	—
1983–84	Pittsburgh Penguins	NHL	53	11	17	28	8	—	—	—	—	—
1984–85	Baltimore Skipjacks	AHL	78	31	39	70	48	15	4	8	12	6
1985–86	Pittsburgh Penguins	NHL	5	0	0	0	2	—	—	—	—	—
1985–86	Baltimore Skipjacks	AHL	73	38	49	87	38	—	—	—	—	—
1986–87	Salzburger EC	Austria	19	18	19	37	28	—	—	—	—	—
1986–87	EV Landshut	Germany	20	23	12	35	25	—	—	—	—	—
1987–88	Sportbund DJK Rosenheim	Germany	21	10	13	23	34	—	—	—	—	—
1988–89	HC Fiemme Cavalese	Italy	36	40	47	87	26	—	—	—	—	—
1988–89	HC Davos	NLA	1	0	1	1	0	—	—	—	—	—
1994–95	Wichita Thunder	CHL	23	11	19	30	8	11	13	11	24	10
NHL totals			195	47	49	96	74	21	2	2	4	2

== Awards and achievements ==
- CHL First All-Star Team (1981)
