= Brian Young (ice hockey) =

Canadian ice hockey player

- Born: October 2, 1958 (age 66); Jasper, Alberta, Canada
- Height: 6 ft 2 in (188 cm)
- Weight: 175 lb (79 kg; 12 st 7 lb)
- Position: Defence
- Shot: Right
- Played for: Chicago Black Hawks; Schwenninger ERC; Kölner EC
- NHL draft: 63rd overall, 1978; Chicago Black Hawks
- Playing career: 1978–1990

Brian Donald Young (born October 2, 1958) is a Canadian former professional ice hockey defenceman who played eight games in the National Hockey League with the Chicago Black Hawks during the 1980–81 season. Young was a fourth round selection by the Black Hawks in the 1978 NHL Amateur Draft. He spent the majority of his career with Schwenninger ERC of the German Bundesliga, where he played from 1981 to 1987.

== Career statistics ==
=== Regular season and playoffs ===
			Regular season					Playoffs
Season	Team	League	GP	G	A	Pts	PIM	GP	G	A	Pts	PIM
1974–75	Estevan Bruins	SJHL	—	—	—	—	—	—	—	—	—	—
1975–76	New Westminster Bruins	WCHL	72	4	32	36	77	17	0	13	13	36
1975–76	New Westminster Bruins	M-Cup	—	—	—	—	—	4	0	3	3	5
1976–77	New Westminster Bruins	WCHL	69	7	34	41	75	12	0	5	5	26
1976–77	New Westminster Bruins	M-Cup	—	—	—	—	—	5	1	0	1	13
1977–78	New Westminster Bruins	WCHL	63	14	43	57	70	21	7	18	25	10
1977–78	New Westminster Bruins	M-Cup	—	—	—	—	—	5	1	1	2	6
1978–79	New Brunswick Hawks	AHL	79	10	16	26	35	5	0	2	2	2
1979–80	New Brunswick Hawks	AHL	73	18	30	48	82	17	2	11	13	20
1980–81	Chicago Black Hawks	NHL	8	0	2	2	6	—	—	—	—	—
1980–81	Dallas Black Hawks	CHL	53	7	16	23	43	6	1	2	3	11
1981–82	New Brunswick Hawks	AHL	3	0	0	0	0	14	0	1	1	7
1981–82	Schwenninger ERC	GER	44	11	17	28	102	—	—	—	—	—
1982–83	Schwenninger ERC	GER	35	6	16	22	86	8	1	4	5	0
1983–84	Schwenninger ERC	GER	35	5	9	14	42	—	—	—	—	—
1984–85	Schwenninger ERC	GER	36	7	21	28	62	3	1	1	2	—
1985–86	Kölner EC	GER	25	10	11	21	63	10	2	10	12	—
1986–87	Kölner EC	GER	16	1	12	13	32	—	—	—	—	—
1987–88	EHC Chur	NLB	36	19	16	35	42	—	—	—	—	—
1988–89	EHC Chur	NLB	17	7	8	15	20	8	3	7	10	8
1989–90	EHC Chur	NLB	24	18	8	26	28	—	—	—	—	—
GER totals			191	40	86	126	387	21	4	15	19	—
NHL totals			8	0	2	2	6	—	—	—	—	—

=== International ===
Year	Team	Event	GP	G	A	Pts	PIM
1978	Canada	WJC	6	0	2	2	2
Junior totals			6	0	2	2	2

== Awards ==
- WCHL Second All-Star Team – 1978
