= Dave Orleski =

Canadian ice hockey player

- Born: December 26, 1959 (age 65); Edmonton, Alberta, Canada
- Height: 6 ft 4 in (193 cm)
- Weight: 211 lb (96 kg; 15 st 1 lb)
- Position: Left wing
- Shot: Left
- Played for: Montreal Canadiens
- NHL draft: 79th overall, 1979; Montreal Canadiens
- Playing career: 1979–1985

David Eugene Orleski (born December 26, 1959) is a Canadian former professional ice hockey forward. He played 2 games in the National Hockey League for the Montreal Canadiens, one each in the 1980–81 and 1981–82 seasons. The rest of his career, which lasted from 1979 to 1985, was spent in the minor leagues.

== Career statistics ==
=== Regular season and playoffs ===
			Regular season					Playoffs
Season	Team	League	GP	G	A	Pts	PIM	GP	G	A	Pts	PIM
1976–77	New Westminster Bruins	WCHL	62	8	14	22	29	14	3	4	7	8
1976–77	New Westminster Bruins	M-Cup	—	—	—	—	—	5	2	2	4	14
1977–78	New Westminster Bruins	WCHL	64	15	35	50	132	14	12	9	21	28
1978–79	New Westminster Bruins	WHL	71	27	39	66	128	8	3	4	7	2
1979–80	Nova Scotia Voyageurs	AHL	70	24	24	48	32	6	0	2	2	0
1980–81	Montreal Canadiens	NHL	1	0	0	0	0	—	—	—	—	—
1980–81	Nova Scotia Voyageurs	AHL	37	8	13	21	44	6	2	1	3	7
1981–82	Montreal Canadiens	NHL	1	0	0	0	0	—	—	—	—	—
1981–82	Nova Scotia Voyageurs	AHL	64	14	23	37	15	9	1	2	3	6
1982–83	Nova Scotia Voyageurs	AHL	68	30	37	67	28	3	1	0	1	0
1983–84	Nova Scotia Voyageurs	AHL	20	6	9	15	14	12	2	2	4	0
1983–84	Salt Lake Golden Eagles	CHL	3	0	1	1	4	—	—	—	—	—
1984–85	Nova Scotia Oilers	AHL	2	0	1	1	0	—	—	—	—	—
AHL totals			261	82	107	189	133	36	6	7	13	13
NHL totals			2	0	0	0	0	—	—	—	—	—

=== International ===
Year	Team	Event	GP	G	A	Pts	PIM
1979	Canada	WJC	5	2	0	2	0
Junior totals			5	2	0	2	0
