= Miles Zaharko =

Canadian ice hockey player (born 1957)

- Born: April 30, 1957 (age 68) Mannville, Alberta, Canada
- Height: 6 ft 1 in (185 cm)
- Weight: 209 lb (95 kg; 14 st 13 lb)
- Position: Defence
- Shot: Left
- Played for: Atlanta Flames; Chicago Black Hawks
- NHL draft: 20th overall, 1977; Atlanta Flames
- WHA draft: 8th overall, 1977; Winnipeg Jets
- Playing career: 1977–1984

Miles Zaharko (born April 30, 1957) is a Canadian former professional ice hockey player whose career lasted from 1977 to 1984. He played in the National Hockey League with the Atlanta Flames and Chicago Black Hawks.

== Playing career ==
A native of Mannville, a small farming village in northern Alberta, Miles Zaharko was drafted as a defenceman by the Atlanta Flames in the second round, 20th overall, of the 1977 NHL amateur draft.

Miles Zaharko scored 5 goals and 32 assists in the 129 regular-season games in the National Hockey League which he played with the Flames and the Chicago Black Hawks.

== Career statistics ==
=== Regular season and playoffs ===
			Regular season					Playoffs
Season	Team	League	GP	G	A	Pts	PIM	GP	G	A	Pts	PIM
1973–74	Bellingham Blazers	BCJHL	64	4	21	25	79	—	—	—	—	—
1974–75	Vermillion Bruins	AJHL	60	40	44	84	110	—	—	—	—	—
1975–76	New Westminster Bruins	WCHL	70	10	44	54	45	17	2	5	7	20
1975–76	New Westminster Bruins	M-Cup	—	—	—	—	—	4	0	3	3	8
1976–77	New Westminster Bruins	WCHL	72	14	48	62	68	14	1	10	11	20
1976–77	New Westminster Bruins	M-Cup	—	—	—	—	—	5	1	4	5	0
1977–78	Nova Scotia Voyageurs	AHL	8	0	3	3	6	—	—	—	—	—
1977–78	Atlanta Flames	NHL	71	1	19	20	26	1	0	0	0	0
1978–79	Tulsa Oilers	CHL	54	2	20	22	28	—	—	—	—	—
1978–79	Chicago Black Hawks	NHL	1	0	0	0	0	—	—	—	—	—
1978–79	New Brunswick Hawks	AHL	13	1	6	7	2	5	1	4	5	2
1979–80	New Brunswick Hawks	AHL	77	2	20	22	34	17	2	14	16	16
1980–81	Chicago Black Hawks	NHL	42	3	11	14	40	2	0	0	0	0
1980–81	New Brunswick Hawks	AHL	33	7	18	25	27	—	—	—	—	—
1981–82	Chicago Black Hawks	NHL	15	1	2	3	18	—	—	—	—	—
1981–82	New Brunswick Hawks	AHL	52	6	12	18	50	15	0	9	9	4
1982–83	Springfield Indians	AHL	54	6	18	24	20	—	—	—	—	—
1983–84	Duisburger SC	GER-2	12	4	3	7	22	—	—	—	—	—
AHL totals			237	22	77	99	139	37	3	27	30	22
NHL totals			129	5	32	37	84	3	0	0	0	0

Preceded by Ron Duguay	Winnipeg Jets first-round draft pick 1977	Succeeded by Jimmy Mann
