= Brad McCrimmon =

Canadian ice hockey player and coach (1959–2011)

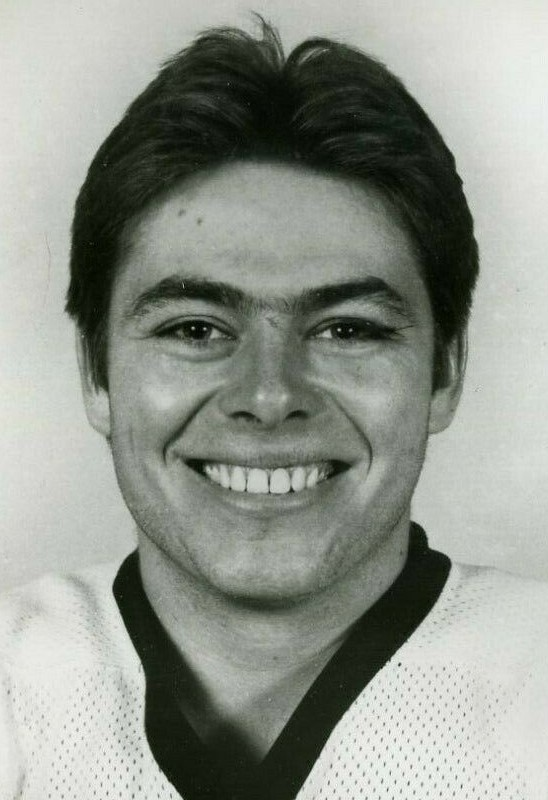
- McCrimmon with the Boston Bruins in 1979
- Born: March 29, 1959 Dodsland, Saskatchewan, Canada
- Died: September 7, 2011 (aged 52) Yaroslavl, Russia
- Height: 5 ft 11 in (180 cm)
- Weight: 193 lb (88 kg; 13 st 11 lb)
- Position: Defence
- Shot: Left
- Played for: Boston Bruins; Philadelphia Flyers; Calgary Flames; Detroit Red Wings; Hartford Whalers; Phoenix Coyotes
- National team: Canada
- NHL draft: 15th overall, 1979; Boston Bruins
- Playing career: 1979–1997
Medal record
Representing Canada
Men's ice hockey
World Junior Championships
Bronze medal – third place	1978 Canada

Byron Brad McCrimmon (March 29, 1959 – September 7, 2011) was a Canadian professional ice hockey player and coach. A defenceman, he played over 1,200 games in the National Hockey League (NHL) for the Boston Bruins, Philadelphia Flyers, Calgary Flames, Detroit Red Wings, Hartford Whalers and Phoenix Coyotes between 1979 and 1997. He achieved his greatest success in Calgary, where he was named a second team All-Star in 1987–88, played in the 1988 NHL All-Star Game and won the Plus-Minus Award with a league leading total of +48. In 1989, he helped the Flames win their only Stanley Cup championship. His career plus-minus of +444 is the 10th highest total in NHL history, and the highest among players not inducted into the Hockey Hall of Fame.

McCrimmon turned to coaching following his playing career, serving as an assistant with the New York Islanders before taking over as head coach of the Western Hockey League's Saskatoon Blades for two seasons between 1998 and 2000. He then returned to the NHL as an assistant, first with the Flames then the Atlanta Thrashers and finally the Red Wings. He left the NHL to become the head coach of Lokomotiv Yaroslavl of the Kontinental Hockey League (KHL) in 2011. He never coached a regular season game however, as he was killed, along with most of the team, after their plane crashed en route to their first game.

== Playing career ==
=== Junior ===
McCrimmon began his junior career at the age of 15 with the Prince Albert Raiders of the Saskatchewan Junior Hockey League (SJHL). He played two seasons with the team, scoring 23 goals and 84 points. In his second season, 1975–76, he was named the SJHL's defenceman of the year. For the 1976–77 season, he moved up to the Brandon Wheat Kings of the Western Canada Hockey League (WCHL). He scored 84 points in 72 games in his first WCHL season and added 13 points in 15 playoff games as the Wheat Kings reached the league championship series, only to lose to the New Westminster Bruins. McCrimmon scored 97 points in 1977–78 and 98 in 1978–79. He was named the defenceman of the year in 1978 and was named to the league all-star team in both seasons. He also joined the Canadian junior team at the World Junior Championship in each season. He recorded two assists in six games to help Canada win a bronze medal at the 1978 tournament and had three points in five games in 1979 though Canada failed to medal.

With McCrimmon as team captain, the Wheat Kings again reached the league championship in 1978–79. He scored 28 points in 22 games to help Brandon win the President's Cup. The team advanced to the 1979 Memorial Cup tournament where it reached the final against the Ontario Hockey League champion Peterborough Petes. McCrimmon routinely played a high number of minutes each game; his teammates marvelled at his stamina. In the Memorial Cup final, he played virtually every minute of the contest. His total ice time was 60 minutes, 38 seconds, and he was off the ice only to serve a two-minute penalty. Peterborough won the game, 2–1 in overtime, after McCrimmon lost the puck on a play he thought was icing was not called. Peterborough's Terry Bovair stole the puck from him and scored the championship winning goal. Despite the loss, McCrimmon was named a tournament all-star on defence.

=== Professional ===
At the 1979 NHL entry draft, considered one of the deepest in league history, McCrimmon was selected 15th overall by the Boston Bruins. He made his NHL debut on October 11, 1979, in the team's opening night victory over the Winnipeg Jets. He scored 5 goals and 16 points in his rookie season of 1979–80 and improved to 11 goals and 29 points in his second season. With only nine points in the 1981–82 season, McCrimmon had gained a reputation as a player who did not attack with the puck in the NHL. Following the retirement of Rogie Vachon, the Bruins needed a new goaltender. They sent McCrimmon to the Philadelphia Flyers in exchange for Pete Peeters on June 9, 1982.

Flyers' coach Bob McCammon argued that McCrimmon had been "intimidated" by playing with fellow 1979 Bruins pick and all-star, Ray Bourque, and that he could be a better overall defenceman. McCrimmon's offence improved in his first two seasons in Philadelphia – 25 points in 1982–83 and 24, though without a goal scored, in 1983–84 – but he established himself as a top shutdown defenceman with the Flyers. He recorded 43 points in 1984–85 and posted a plus-minus rating of +52, fifth best in the NHL. McCrimmon was ruled out of the 1985 Stanley Cup Playoffs in the third game of the league semi-final against the Quebec Nordiques when he suffered a third-degree separation of his left shoulder following a hard hit by Wilf Paiement, an injury that required surgery to repair. The Flyers reached the final without McCrimmon, but were defeated by the Edmonton Oilers for the Stanley Cup. McCrimmon returned to start the 1985–86 season, in which he had his best season statistically. He appeared in all 80 games for the Flyers and set career highs of 13 goals, 43 assists, 56 points and his plus-minus rating of +83 was second only to defensive partner Mark Howe. He was named recipient of the Barry Ashbee Trophy as the Flyers' top defenceman.

McCrimmon and the Flyers became embroiled in a contract dispute prior to the 1986–87 season. The two sides were unable to agree on a contract the season before, and an arbitrator was required to resolve the impasse. The arbitrator sided with the team, setting a contract at the Flyers' offer of US$165,000 for that season (he asked for $200,000), with an option to extend the deal for 1986–87. The Flyers exercised that option, and though he admitted he was under contract for the season, McCrimmon refused to play unless a new deal was reached. When the two sides were unable to come to an agreement, McCrimmon went home to Saskatchewan as the season began. The Flyers suspended McCrimmon on September 26, 1986, after he refused to appear in the first exhibition games. The impasse was not resolved until a month later, when he and the team agreed to a one-year contract on October 29. He immediately returned to the team and appeared in 72 of the Flyers' 80 games, recording 22 points and finishing fourth in the league at +45. In the 1987 Stanley Cup Playoffs, he appeared in all 26 post-season games as the Flyers again reached the final against Edmonton. McCrimmon scored the game-winning goal in Game 3 but the Flyers lost the series, but not before they took the Oilers to seven games, the first time since 1971 a full seven game series had been played.

Following the season, general manager Bobby Clarke refused to sign a new deal with McCrimmon, choosing instead to trade him. He was sent to the Calgary Flames on August 27, 1987, in exchange for a third-round selection at the 1988 NHL entry draft and a first-rounder at the 1989 Draft. On the 1987–88 Flames, McCrimmon joined Al MacInnis, Paul Reinhart, Gary Suter and Ric Nattress to form one of the top defences in the NHL. He scored 42 points for the Flames, won the NHL Plus-Minus Award with a league-leading +48 and was named a second team All-Star. Additionally, he played in the 1988 All-Star Game.

McCrimmon recorded only 22 points in 1988–89 – his lowest in seven seasons – but led all NHL defencemen with a +43 rating. He appeared in all 22 playoff games for the Flames as the team defeated the Montreal Canadiens to win the first Stanley Cup championship in franchise history. McCrimmon was named the 10th captain in Flames history on November 3, 1989, succeeding Jim Peplinski, who retired early in the 1989–90 season. He scored 4 goals and 19 points during the 1989–90 season, but fell out of favour with head coach Terry Crisp as the two disagreed over how the team's defencemen were used. The Flames chose to trade him following the season, sending him to the Detroit Red Wings on June 15, 1990, in exchange for a second-round draft pick.

In 1991–92, McCrimmon was paired with a young Nicklas Lidström. Though he focused on defence, allowing Lidström to be more creative offensively, McCrimmon's 29 points were a significant improvement on the 13 he scored the season before. He played one more season in Detroit before again being traded, this time to the Hartford Whalers on June 1, 1993, in exchange for a sixth-round draft pick. In Hartford, the 34-year-old McCrimmon served as a mentor for 18-year-old Chris Pronger. Offensively, he scored 16 points total in three seasons with the Whalers between 1993 and 1996. Leaving the team as a free agent, McCrimmon signed with the Phoenix Coyotes for the 1996–97 season. He appeared in 37 games that season, scoring one goal and adding five assists. Following the season, he announced his retirement.

McCrimmon was paired with some of the best defencemen of his generation. In addition to Lidstrom and Pronger, he played with Hockey Hall of Famers Ray Bourque, Mark Howe and Paul Coffey. He was known as a stay at home defenceman who focused on limiting the opposition's chances. He played a physical game, often in the "dirty" areas of the ice – battling opponents in the corners and in front of the net. McCrimmon's career plus-minus was +444, a total surpassed by only nine players as of 2012. Brian Propp, a teammate of his in Philadelphia, said that he was one of the most under-rated defencemen of his time.

Joe Mullen, member of the Hockey Hall of Fame and McCrimmon's teammate on the 1989 Stanley Cup Champion Calgary Flames, named McCrimmon as the most difficult player to play against.

== Coaching career and death ==
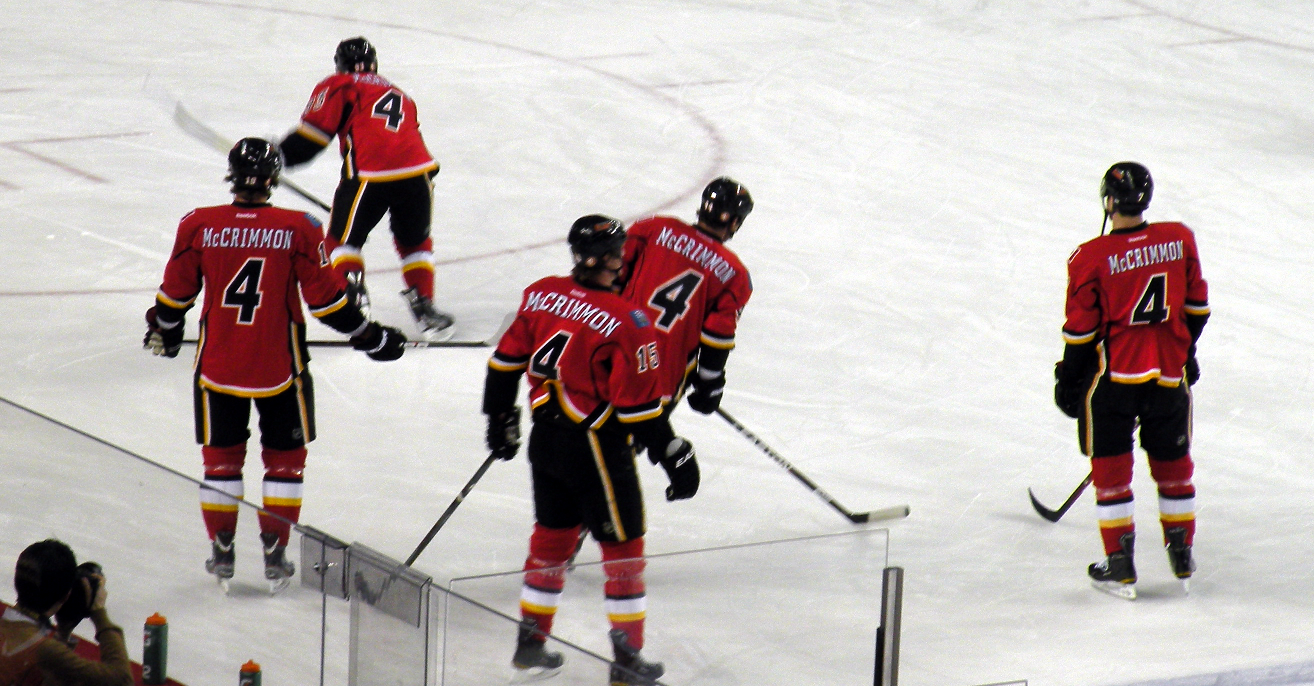
The Calgary Flames wear special uniforms honouring McCrimmon prior to an NHL game in 2011–12.

McCrimmon moved behind the bench shortly after his retirement, joining the New York Islanders as an assistant coach to Mike Milbury on August 19, 1997. He left the team after two years to become head coach of the Saskatoon Blades of the Western Hockey League in 1999. In two seasons with the team, he coached 144 games, winning 50 and tying 15. McCrimmon coached the Blades to a second-place finish in the East Division in 1999–2000 and a seven-game opening round playoff victory over the Regina Pats before the team was eliminated by the Calgary Hitmen.

Returning to the NHL in 2000, McCrimmon joined the Calgary Flames as an assistant to Don Hay. He remained with the team for two and a half seasons, serving under both Hay and successor Greg Gilbert until the team replaced its coaching staff on December 3, 2002. He returned to the NHL in 2004 as an assistant for the Atlanta Thrashers. He was promoted to associate coach in his fourth season when team general manager Don Waddell fired head coach Bob Hartley during the 2007–08 season. McCrimmon had been offered the Thrashers head coaching position after Waddell's dismissal, but turned it down after the team failed to guarantee he would retain the position beyond the end of the season. Leaving the Thrashers, McCrimmon signed a three-year contract with the Detroit Red Wings in 2008 to serve as an assistant coach.

Looking to further his career, he left Detroit on May 19, 2011, and was introduced as head coach of Lokomotiv Yaroslavl of the Kontinental Hockey League (KHL) on May 29. He hoped that coaching the Russian club would help him land an NHL head coaching position in the future. He never coached a game for Lokomotiv, as he was killed in the 2011 Lokomotiv Yaroslavl plane crash en route to their first game of the season. McCrimmon died along with nearly the entire team.

== Personal life ==
McCrimmon was born on March 29, 1959 in Dodsland, Saskatchewan, but grew up on the family farm near the village of Plenty. He often returned to his hometown during his playing days, spending his summers training on the family farm. He brought the Stanley Cup back to Plenty in 1989 after winning it with the Flames, fulfilling a promise McCrimmon made to his grandfather as a youth.

Hockey was a significant part of McCrimmon's life from his youth. His father Byron was a long time senior player and coach for the Rosetown Red Wings in Saskatchewan. The younger McCrimmon played for teams in both Plenty and Rosetown at the same time, often appearing on teams one level above his age. His younger brother Kelly is the general manager for the Vegas Golden Knights, and the pair played together as teammates with the Wheat Kings in 1978–79.

Nicknamed "Beast" and "Sarge", McCrimmon was often considered "gruff" and had a direct way of speaking that cultivated respect amongst his peers. According to former teammate Lanny McDonald: "He was tough, he was abrasive, but on the inside he was a big teddy bear, a big softie." McCrimmon's brother remembered him as a person who dedicated himself to his family. McCrimmon had two children with his wife Maureen: daughter Carlin and son Liam.

== Career statistics ==
=== Regular season and playoffs ===
			Regular season					Playoffs
Season	Team	League	GP	G	A	Pts	PIM	GP	G	A	Pts	PIM
1974–75	Prince Albert Raiders	SJHL	38	4	22	26	—	—	—	—	—	—
1975–76	Prince Albert Raiders	SJHL	46	19	39	58	126	—	—	—	—	—
1976–77	Brandon Wheat Kings	WCHL	72	18	66	84	96	15	3	10	13	16
1977–78	Brandon Wheat Kings	WCHL	65	19	78	97	245	8	2	11	13	20
1978–79	Brandon Wheat Kings	WHL	66	24	74	98	139	22	9	19	28	34
1978–79	Brandon Wheat Kings	M-Cup	—	—	—	—	—	5	0	5	5	10
1979–80	Boston Bruins	NHL	72	5	11	16	94	10	1	1	2	28
1980–81	Boston Bruins	NHL	78	11	18	29	148	3	0	1	1	2
1981–82	Boston Bruins	NHL	78	1	8	9	83	2	0	0	0	2
1982–83	Philadelphia Flyers	NHL	79	4	21	25	61	3	0	0	0	4
1983–84	Philadelphia Flyers	NHL	71	0	24	24	76	1	0	0	0	4
1984–85	Philadelphia Flyers	NHL	66	8	35	43	81	11	2	1	3	15
1985–86	Philadelphia Flyers	NHL	80	13	43	56	85	5	2	0	2	2
1986–87	Philadelphia Flyers	NHL	71	10	29	39	52	26	3	5	8	30
1987–88	Calgary Flames	NHL	80	7	35	42	98	9	2	3	5	22
1988–89	Calgary Flames	NHL	72	5	17	22	96	22	0	3	3	30
1989–90	Calgary Flames	NHL	79	4	15	19	78	6	0	2	2	8
1990–91	Detroit Red Wings	NHL	64	0	13	13	81	7	1	1	2	21
1991–92	Detroit Red Wings	NHL	79	7	22	29	118	11	0	1	1	8
1992–93	Detroit Red Wings	NHL	60	1	14	15	71	—	—	—	—	—
1993–94	Hartford Whalers	NHL	65	1	5	6	72	—	—	—	—	—
1994–95	Hartford Whalers	NHL	33	0	1	1	42	—	—	—	—	—
1995–96	Hartford Whalers	NHL	58	3	6	9	62	—	—	—	—	—
1996–97	Phoenix Coyotes	NHL	37	1	5	6	18	—	—	—	—	—
NHL totals			1,222	81	322	403	1,416	116	11	18	29	176

=== International ===
Year	Team	Event	GP	G	A	Pts	PIM
1978	Canada	WJC	6	0	2	2	4
1979	Canada	WJC	5	1	2	3	2
Junior totals			11	1	4	5	6

=== Coaching ===
Season	Team	League	Regular season							Post season
Season	Team	League	G	W	L	T	OTL	Pct	Division rank	Result
1998–99	Saskatoon Blades	WHL	72	16	49	7	—	.271	6th East	Did not qualify
1999–00	Saskatoon Blades	WHL	72	34	30	8	3	.549	2nd East	Lost in second round
WHL totals			144	50	76	15	3	.410		

== Awards and honours ==
Award	Year
Junior
SJHL Defenceman of the Year	1975–76
WCHL second All-Star team	1976–77
Bill Hunter Memorial Trophy	1977–78
WCHL/WHL first All-Star team	1977–78; 1978–79
Memorial Cup All-Star team	1979
NHL
Stanley Cup champion	1989
Second team All-Star	1987–88
NHL Plus-Minus Award	1987–88
Philadelphia Flyers
Barry Ashbee Trophy	1984–85

== See also ==
- List of NHL players with 1,000 games played

Preceded by Ray Bourque	Boston Bruins first-round draft pick 1979	Succeeded by Barry Pederson
Preceded by Jim Peplinski	Calgary Flames captain 1989–90	Succeeded by Rotating captains
Preceded by Wayne Gretzky	Winner of the NHL Plus/Minus Award; 1988	Succeeded by Joe Mullen
