= John Ogrodnick =

Canadian ice hockey player (born 1959)

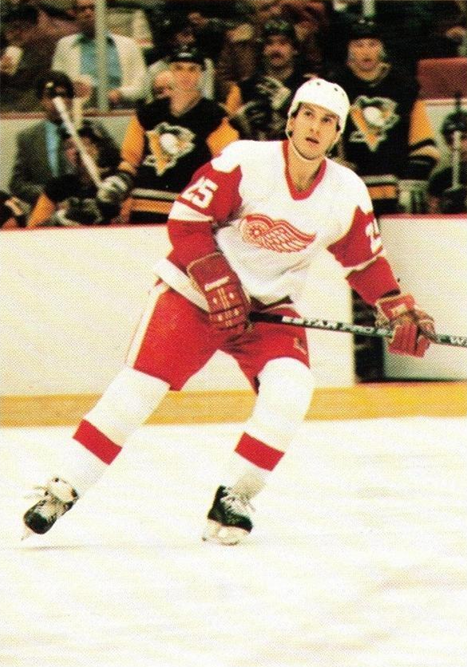
- Ogrodnick with the Detroit Red Wings in 1984
- Born: June 20, 1959 (age 67) Ottawa, Ontario, Canada
- Height: 6 ft 2 in (188 cm)
- Weight: 190 lb (86 kg; 13 st 8 lb)
- Position: Left wing
- Shot: Left
- Played for: Detroit Red Wings; Quebec Nordiques; New York Rangers
- National team: Canada
- NHL draft: 66th overall, 1979; Detroit Red Wings
- Playing career: 1979–1993

John Alexander Ogrodnick (born June 20, 1959) is a Canadian former professional ice hockey left winger who played fourteen seasons in the National Hockey League from 1979–80 through 1992–93, with the Detroit Red Wings, Quebec Nordiques, and New York Rangers. Ogrodnick was born in Ottawa.

== Playing career ==
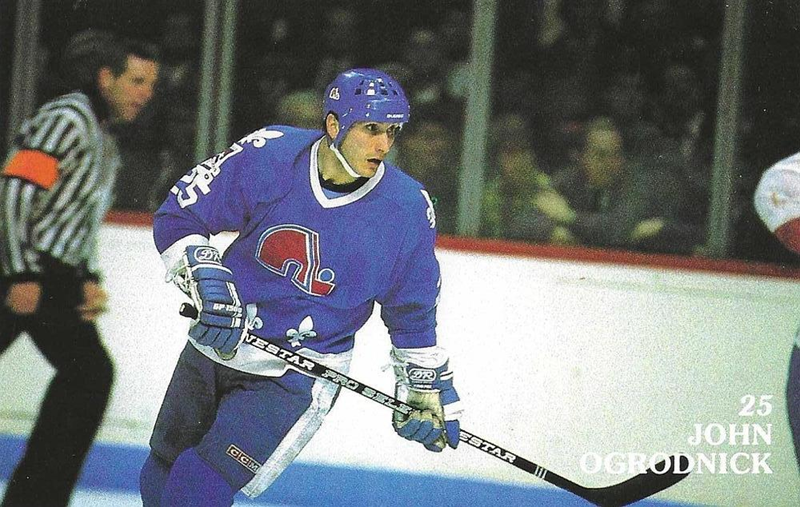
Ogrodnick with the Quebec Nordiques in 1987

Ogrodnick was drafted 66th overall by the Detroit Red Wings in the 1979 NHL entry draft. Ogrodnick played 928 career NHL games, scoring 402 goals and 425 assists for 827 points.

Ogrodnick turned pro with the Red Wings American Hockey League farm club in Adirondack in 1979–80, and also played 41 games in the NHL with the Red Wings. In the 1980–81 season he became a full-time NHLer and led the Wings with 35 goals. It would be the first of six straight seasons he would be the Red Wings top goal scorer. He topped 40 goals in the 1982–83 season then managed 42 goals the following year despite being limited to just 64 games. His best statistical season was the 1984–85 season when he set career highs with 55 goals (a Detroit record at the time), 50 assists, and 105 points. The following season he dipped to 38 goals and had potted 12 in 38 games during the 1986–87 campaign when he was shipped to the Quebec Nordiques as part of a six-player deal.

The Nordiques were thrilled to acquire him, with coach Michel Bergeron saying "I think John Ogrodnick is one of the best players in the league." Despite a solid performance for the Nordiques, Ogrodnick was never happy playing in Quebec and asked general manager Maurice Filion to trade him in the off-season. After scoring 11 goals and 27 points in 32 games to complete that season and putting up a point-a-game in 13 playoff contests Ogrodnick was dealt to the New York Rangers on the eve of the 1987-88 season. Perhaps not coincidentally Michel Bergeron had moved from Quebec to behind the Rangers bench, though Rangers general manager Phil Esposito acknowledged that part of the impetus for the trade was ensuring Ogrodnick did not end up with division rival the Pittsburgh Penguins. "Ogrodnick beside Lemieux in Pittsburgh would have 55 or 60 goals so forget it. I'd rather have him shooting for me than at me."

His first two seasons on Broadway were underwhelming but his third season with the Rangers saw him recapture his scoring touch. Roger Neilson had taken over as the Rangers head coach and he paired Ogrodnick with Kelly Kisio and Brian Mullen and told him he would give him ten games to gel. The trio clicked early and would go on to finish 1-2-3 in team scoring with Ogrodnick leading the way with 43 goals and 74 points. Following the success of the 1989–90 season, Ogrodnick's contract expired which led to tense negotiations with the Rangers for a new pact. Though he would ultimately sign on for two more years, his totals dropped in each season and he was done in New York following the 1991–92 season.

In September 1992 John Ogrodnick signed a free agent contract to return to the Detroit Red Wings. This edition of the Wings was deep offensively with two of their top scorers, Dino Ciccarelli and Ray Sheppard ahead of Ogrodnick on the right wing depth chart, it proved very difficult for him to make his mark in Detroit. With little room, Ogrodnick was used sparingly by Detroit but was productive enough in his limited usage to put up 12 points in 19 games. After suiting up for one playoff game that spring, Ogrodnick retired from hockey.

For a time, he was the vice president of the Red Wings Alumni Association.

== Career statistics ==
=== Regular season and playoffs ===
			Regular season					Playoffs
Season	Team	League	GP	G	A	Pts	PIM	GP	G	A	Pts	PIM
1976–77	Maple Ridge Bruins	BCHL	67	54	56	110	63	—	—	—	—	—
1976–77	New Westminster Bruins	WCHL	14	2	4	6	0	14	3	3	6	2
1976–77	New Westminster Bruins	MC	—	—	—	—	—	5	2	0	2	0
1977–78	New Westminster Bruins	WCHL	72	59	29	88	47	21	14	7	21	14
1977–78	New Westminster Bruins	MC	—	—	—	—	—	5	3	1	4	2
1978–79	New Westminster Bruins	WHL	72	48	36	84	38	6	2	0	2	4
1979–80	Adirondack Red Wings	AHL	39	13	20	33	21	—	—	—	—	—
1979–80	Detroit Red Wings	NHL	41	8	24	32	8	—	—	—	—	—
1980–81	Detroit Red Wings	NHL	80	35	35	70	14	—	—	—	—	—
1981–82	Detroit Red Wings	NHL	80	28	26	54	28	—	—	—	—	—
1982–83	Detroit Red Wings	NHL	80	41	44	85	30	—	—	—	—	—
1983–84	Detroit Red Wings	NHL	64	42	36	78	14	4	0	0	0	0
1984–85	Detroit Red Wings	NHL	79	55	50	105	30	3	1	1	2	0
1985–86	Detroit Red Wings	NHL	76	38	32	70	18	—	—	—	—	—
1986–87	Detroit Red Wings	NHL	39	12	28	40	6	—	—	—	—	—
1986–87	Quebec Nordiques	NHL	32	11	16	27	4	13	9	4	13	6
1987–88	New York Rangers	NHL	62	22	32	54	16	—	—	—	—	—
1988–89	Denver Rangers	IHL	3	2	0	2	0	—	—	—	—	—
1988–89	New York Rangers	NHL	60	13	29	42	14	3	2	0	2	0
1989–90	New York Rangers	NHL	80	43	31	74	44	10	6	3	9	0
1990–91	New York Rangers	NHL	79	31	23	54	10	4	0	0	0	0
1991–92	New York Rangers	NHL	55	17	13	30	22	3	0	0	0	0
1992–93	Adirondack Red Wings	AHL	4	2	2	4	0	—	—	—	—	—
1992–93	Detroit Red Wings	NHL	19	6	6	12	2	1	0	0	0	0
NHL totals			928	402	425	827	260	41	18	8	26	6

=== International ===
Year	Team	Event	GP	G	A	Pts	PIM
1979	Canada	WJC	5	3	0	3	4
1981	Canada	WC	8	3	2	5	0

== See also ==
- List of NHL players with 100-point seasons
