= Bobby Smith (ice hockey) =

Canadian ice hockey player, executive (b. 1958)

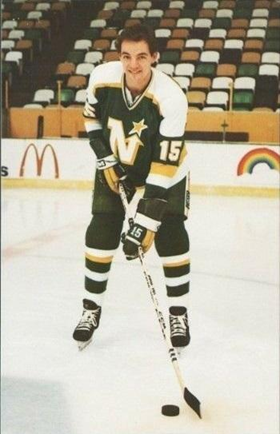
- Smith with the Minnesota North Stars in 1981
- Born: February 12, 1958 (age 68) North Sydney, Nova Scotia, Canada
- Height: 6 ft 4 in (193 cm)
- Weight: 210 lb (95 kg; 15 st 0 lb)
- Position: Centre
- Shot: Left
- Played for: Minnesota North Stars; Montreal Canadiens
- National team: Canada
- NHL draft: 1st overall, 1978; Minnesota North Stars
- Playing career: 1978–1993
Medal record
Men's ice hockey
Representing Canada
World Championships
Bronze medal – third place	1982 Finland

Robert David Smith (born February 12, 1958) is a Canadian professional ice hockey executive and former player. He played for the Minnesota North Stars and Montreal Canadiens in the National Hockey League (NHL). In 184 Stanley Cup playoff games, he recorded 160 points, which is currently the 25th most in league history. He played in four Stanley Cup Finals and won the 1986 Stanley Cup with the Canadiens. He was the 32nd player to record 1,000 points in NHL history, doing so on November 30, 1991. Smith was the majority owner of the junior hockey team Halifax Mooseheads from 2003 to February 2023, which won the Memorial Cup once in 2013.

== Early life ==
Smith was born on February 12, 1958, in North Sydney, Nova Scotia, Canada to Gerald and Jeanne Marie Smith. While he was born in Sydney, Smith and his family moved to Ottawa, Ontario when he was two years old. As a native of Ottawa, Smith grew up a fan of the Montreal Canadiens and became conversational in French. While he was born into an athletic family, only his brother Dan joined him in playing ice hockey. His sister Mary Lou played tennis, and his other sister Paula played volleyball. As a teenager, Smith played football at Laurentian High School and helped represent the Ottawa Tennis Club at various national tournaments. However, he was forced to drop tennis once he joined the Ottawa 67's as hockey and school became too consuming.

== Playing career ==
=== Major junior ===
As a youth playing in the mosquito division as a defenceman, Smith scored 36 goals and seven assists over 14 games. He then played with the Ottawa 67's peewees alongside Doug Wilson, Tim Higgins, and Ron Davidson. Upon advancing to the Ottawa Golden Knights of the Ontario Minor Hockey Association, Smith recorded 40 goals and 26 assists through 30 games. Following the 1974–75 season, Smith joined the Ottawa 67's of the Ontario Major Junior Hockey League (OMJHL). He was one of eight midget players protected by the 67s and was thus ineligible for the OMJHL draft. Upon making his OMJHL debut, Smith recorded 12 goals through his first 16 games of the 1975-76 season. He played the majority of his rookie season on the left wing and finished with 24 goals and 34 assists.

Following the departure of Larry Skinner, head coach Brian Kilrea moved Smith into a centreman position between John Wilson and Yvan Joly for the 1976–77 season. In this new role, Smith scored six goals and six assists through the 67s first eight games. He continued to lead the team in scoring through mid-November with 19 goals and 23 assists. As the season progressed, Kilrea allowed Smith to move between all three forward positions instead of remaining as the centerman. He finished the regular-season leading the league with 65 goals and ranked third in scoring with 135 points. Smith continued to top the league's leaderboard as the 67s advanced to the 1977 Memorial Cup against the New Westminster Bruins. While the 67s failed to clinch the championship title, Smith tied with teammate Doug Wilson for the tournament lead with six goals and 12 points.

Smith returned to the Ottawa 67s for the 1977–78 season, where he set new personal, franchise, and league records with 123 assists and 192 points. While also competing with the 67s, Smith began the first year of his science degree at the University of Ottawa. Smith scored 12 goals through the first five games of the season, including five goals in a 10–2 win over the Niagara Falls Flyers on October 3. In December 1977, Smith was named to Team Canada to represent his home country at the 1978 World Junior Ice Hockey Championships. He scored a goal and an assist over three pre-tournament games despite requiring three stitches to close a gash over his eye. Following Team Canada's loss to Sweden, Smith immediately rejoined the 67s for their game against Toronto the next day. Throughout January and February, Smith and Wayne Gretzky remained head-to-head in leading the league in scoring. While he was named to the OMJHL All-Star team, an illness forced him to bow out of the contest. Although he spent the majority of the season neck-and-neck with Gretzky, Smith eventually pulled ahead and finished the season with a record-setting and league-leading 123 assists and 192 points. His points total beat the OMJHL's previous record set by Mike Kaszycki during the 1975–76 season. As a result of his record-setting season, Smith received the Eddie Powers Memorial Trophy as the OMJHL's scoring leader and the Red Tilson Trophy as the OMJHL's most outstanding player. He was also voted the CHL Player of the Year for the entire Canadian Hockey League. His accomplishments made him the unanimous top draft choice for the 1978 NHL amateur draft.

As the 67's qualified for the OMJHL playoffs they faced off against the Sault Ste. Marie Greyhounds. Once Minnesota North Stars general manager Lou Nanne was certain that the team had the worst record in the NHL, he flew to Sault Ste. Marie, Ontario to watch Smith in person. Despite concerns regarding team finances, Nanne publicly announced that the team would be drafting Smith in the 1978 amateur draft. Nanne had a personal connection to Smith as their brothers were close friends and former teammates. Smith assisted on Jimmy Fox's game-winning goal to help the 67s defeat the Sault Ste. Marie Greyhounds and advance to the OMJHL semi-finals against the Peterborough Petes.

Prior to the amateur draft, Smith also fielded a $1.25 million, five-year offer from the New England Whalers of the World Hockey Association (WHA). Nanne also received nearly daily phone calls from Philadelphia Flyers general manager Keith Allen who was trying to deal for the rights to Smith. It was reported that one of the deals offered included Paul Holmgren and three other players for Smith's draft rights. Smith later revealed that five WHA teams reached out to sign him before the NHL draft, but money was a deciding factor. After being drafted first overall by the North Stars, Smith announced that he had signed a three-year $1 million contract with the team. The Minneapolis Star reported that Smith had signed the contract seven weeks before the amateur draft, and it included a brand endorsement deal with a local ice cream manufacturer.

=== Professional ===
==== First stint with Minnesota (1978–1983) ====
Smith joined the North Stars for their 1978 training camp and immediately impressed the coaching staff. Through seven exhibition games, Smith tied for the team lead with five points. Once the 1978–79 season began, Smith spent the majority of his rookie campaign playing alongside Steve Payne and Al MacAdam. While playing on this line, he recorded three goals and three assists over his first 14 games. His first NHL goal came on October 18, 1978 against the Vancouver Canucks. While he only collected four goals through his first 25 games, Smith began to gain momentum as the season progressed. By February, Smith had recorded 23 goals and 28 assists to lead all NHL rookies in scoring. He finished his rookie season leading the team with 30 goals and 44 assists for 74 points. His points total was the most scored by a rookie in franchise history. As a result of his rookie season, Smith received the Associated Canadian Travellers-City of Ottawa Athlete of the Year award and the Calder Memorial Trophy as the NHL's Rookie of the Year. He was similarly recognized by hockey pundits at The Hockey News and The Sporting News, as well as by his own team. Once the North Stars were eliminated from Stanley Cup playoff consideration, Smith was loaned to Team Canada.

Smith rejoined Payne and MacAdam on the North Stars top line to start the 1979–80 season, and the trio quickly led the team in scoring. Smith held the team lead with six goals and 18 assists over 18 games before suffering an ankle injury on November 15. While Smith was recovering, Tim Young found success as his replacement on the North Stars top line. As Smith could see how well the three worked together, he informed Nanne that he was okay playing with different teammates once he returned to the lineup. After missing 19 games, Smith returned to the North Stars lineup in early January as the centerman between Tom McCarthy and Glen Sharpley. Smith immediately scored five goals over his first five games back but struggled to maintain his rapid pace as the month progressed. After being reunited with his usual linemates, Smith was on pace to reach 100-points by the end of the season. Over a 12-game stretch at the end of February, Smith and his linemates combined for 59 points. On March 25, 1980, Smith recorded his first career NHL hat-trick in a 7–2 win over the Toronto Maple Leafs. Smith finished the regular season with 27 goals and set new career-highs with 56 assists and 83 points. Smith and his linemates ended the season with a combined 111 goals to help the North Stars qualify for the 1980 Stanley Cup playoffs. While Smith went pointless over the Stars' three-game sweep of the Maple Leafs in the preliminary round, he led the team with six assists. However, during the series, Smith suffered a charleyhorse and was considered only 70% healed before the team was set to face the Montreal Canadiens in the Quarterfinals. Once the playoffs concluded, Smith underwent surgery on his left elbow but was expected to recover in time for the 1980-81 season.

==== Montreal Canadiens (1983–1990) ====
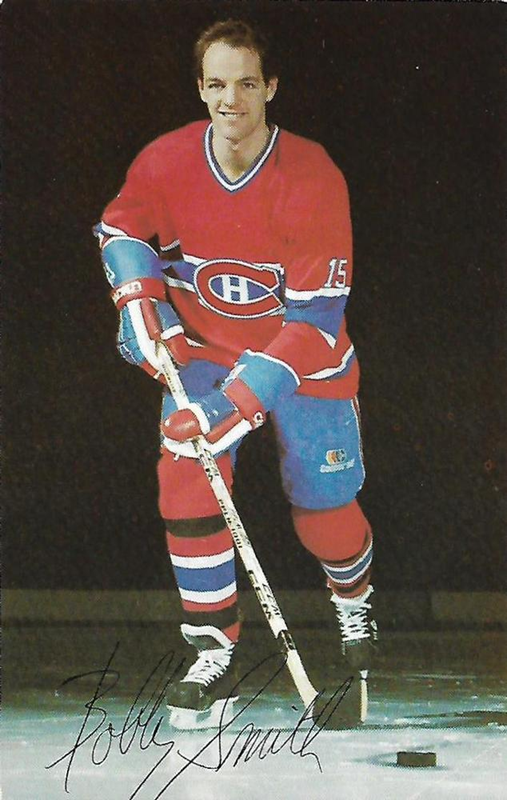
1983 card of Smith for Montreal Canadiens

Smith struggled with the North Stars' new head coach and decreased ice time at the start of the 1983–84 season and requested a trade. While Nanne originally refused, he eventually traded Smith to the Montreal Canadiens in exchange for Keith Acton and Mark Napier on October 28. Smith scored 10 goals in his first 11 games with the team. He later won the Stanley Cup in 1986 with Montreal. On November 6, 1986, Smith recorded his fourth NHL hat-trick to lead the Canadiens to a 6-4 win over the Los Angeles Kings.

On February 4, 1988, Smith scored his 800th NHL point in a 7–3 loss to the Boston Bruins.

On November 24, 1988, Smith recorded his 300th NHL goal in a 5–3 loss to the Quebec Nordiques.

On November 21, 1989, Smith recorded his 600th NHL assist on Mike Keane's first-period goal against the Calgary Flames.

==== Return to Minnesota and retirement (1990–1993) ====
On August 7, 1990, Smith was reacquired by the North Stars in exchange for a fourth-round draft pick. Smith played in his 900th career NHL game on October 21, 1990, in a 7–1 loss to the Chicago Blackhawks.

After experiencing a three-week scoring drought, Smith recorded his 1,000th career NHL point on November 30, 1991, against the Toronto Maple Leafs. He recorded a goal and an assist in the Stars' 4–3 win to become the 33rd player in NHL history to reach the 1,000 point milestone. He reached his 1000th career NHL game later that season.

After it was announced that the North Stars were relocating to Dallas, Texas, Smith declared that he would retire at the end of the 1992–93 season.

== Post-retirement ==
During his first few years with the Minnesota North Stars, Smith enrolled in business classes at the University of Minnesota. While he stopped before earning his degree to focus solely on hockey, he resumed classes after retiring in 1993. He eventually graduated with a bachelor's degree in business and an MBA from the Carlson School of Management. Following this, Smith served as general manager of the NHL's Phoenix Coyotes from 1996 to 2001. While still living in Arizona, Smith learned that the Halifax Mooseheads of the Quebec Major Junior Hockey League (QMJHL) were available for sale and became their majority owner in 2003. While he sold the team in 2023, he remained as a consultant to help ease the transition.

== Personal life ==
Smith and his wife Beth (née Robertson) have three children together. In January 1980, the OMJHL established the "Bobby Smith Trophy" to honour players for their on-ice and academic excellence. The trophy was named after Smith in recognition of his 1977-1978 season, where he graduated high school with a 75% average while leading the league in scoring.

== Achievements and awards ==
- OHL Second All Star Team (1976, 1977)
- Memorial Cup All Star Team (1977)
- George Parsons Trophy (1977)
- OHL Most Valuable Player (1978)
- OHL First All Star Team (1978)
- OHL Record for Most Assists (123) in a Single Season (1977–78)
- OHL Record for Most Points (192) in a Single Season (1977–78)
- OHL Record for Most Power-Play Goals (5) in One Game
- CHL Player of the Year (1978)
- NHL Calder Memorial Trophy (1979)
- NHL Stanley Cup Championship (1986)
- NHL All Star (1981, 1982, 1989, 1991)

== Career statistics ==
=== Regular season and playoffs ===
			Regular season					Playoffs
Season	Team	League	GP	G	A	Pts	PIM	GP	G	A	Pts	PIM
1974–75	Ottawa Golden Knights	Midget	58	74	64	138	—	—	—	—	—	—
1975–76	Ottawa 67's	OMJHL	62	24	34	58	21	12	2	1	3	4
1976–77	Ottawa 67's	OMJHL	64	65	70	135	52	19	16	16	32	29
1977–78	Ottawa 67's	OMJHL	61	69	123	192	44	16	15	15	30	10
1978–79	Minnesota North Stars	NHL	80	30	44	74	39	—	—	—	—	—
1979–80	Minnesota North Stars	NHL	61	27	56	83	24	15	1	13	14	9
1980–81	Minnesota North Stars	NHL	78	29	64	93	73	19	8	17	25	13
1981–82	Minnesota North Stars	NHL	80	43	71	114	82	4	2	4	6	5
1982–83	Minnesota North Stars	NHL	77	24	53	77	81	9	6	4	10	17
1983–84	Minnesota North Stars	NHL	10	3	6	9	9	—	—	—	—	—
1983–84	Montreal Canadiens	NHL	70	26	37	63	62	15	2	7	9	8
1984–85	Montreal Canadiens	NHL	65	16	40	56	59	12	5	6	11	30
1985–86	Montreal Canadiens	NHL	79	31	55	86	55	20	7	8	15	22
1986–87	Montreal Canadiens	NHL	80	28	47	75	72	17	9	9	18	19
1987–88	Montreal Canadiens	NHL	78	27	66	93	78	11	3	4	7	8
1988–89	Montreal Canadiens	NHL	80	32	51	83	69	21	11	8	19	46
1989–90	Montreal Canadiens	NHL	53	12	14	26	35	11	1	4	5	6
1990–91	Minnesota North Stars	NHL	73	15	31	46	60	23	8	8	16	56
1991–92	Minnesota North Stars	NHL	68	9	37	46	109	7	1	4	5	6
1992–93	Minnesota North Stars	NHL	45	5	7	12	10	—	—	—	—	—
NHL totals			1,077	357	679	1,036	917	184	64	96	160	245

=== International ===
Year	Team	Event	GP	G	A	Pts	PIM
1978	Canada	WJC	3	1	4	5	0
1982	Canada	WC	8	5	3	8	0
Junior totals			3	1	4	5	0
Senior totals			8	5	3	8	0

== See also ==
- List of NHL players with 1,000 games played
- List of NHL players with 1,000 points

Preceded by Dale McCourt	NHL first overall draft pick 1978	Succeeded by Rob Ramage
Preceded by Brad Maxwell	Minnesota North Stars first-round draft pick 1978	Succeeded by Craig Hartsburg
Preceded by Mike Bossy	Winner of the Calder Memorial Trophy; 1979	Succeeded by Ray Bourque
Preceded by Dale McCourt	CHL Player of the Year; 1978	Succeeded by Pierre Lacroix
Preceded by John Paddock	General Manager of the Phoenix Coyotes; 1996–2000	Succeeded by Cliff Fletcher
