= John-Paul Kelly (ice hockey) =

Canadian ice hockey player

- Born: November 15, 1959 (age 66) Edmonton, Alberta, Canada
- Height: 6 ft 1 in (185 cm)
- Weight: 215 lb (98 kg; 15 st 5 lb)
- Position: Left wing
- Shot: Left
- Played for: Los Angeles Kings
- NHL draft: 50th overall, 1979; Los Angeles Kings
- Playing career: 1979–1986

John-Paul Kelly (born November 15, 1959) is a Canadian former professional ice hockey player. He played 400 games in the National Hockey League for the Los Angeles Kings between 1979 and 1986.

== Career statistics ==
=== Regular season and playoffs ===
			Regular season					Playoffs
Season	Team	League	GP	G	A	Pts	PIM	GP	G	A	Pts	PIM
1975–76	Maple Ridge Blazers	BCJHL	64	34	35	69	68	—	—	—	—	—
1975–76	New Westminster Bruins	WCHL	2	0	0	0	2	—	—	—	—	—
1976–77	New Westminster Bruins	WCHL	68	35	24	59	62	5	2	2	4	0
1976–77	Maple Ridge Blazers	BCJHL	1	0	0	0	4	—	—	—	—	—
1977–78	New Westminster Bruins	WCHL	70	26	30	56	124	20	10	15	25	51
1977–78	New Westminster Bruins	M-Cup	—	—	—	—	—	5	3	0	3	2
1978–79	New Westminster Bruins	WHL	70	25	22	47	207	5	0	1	1	15
1979–80	Los Angeles Kings	NHL	40	2	5	7	28	3	0	0	0	2
1980–81	Los Angeles Kings	NHL	19	3	6	9	8	4	0	1	1	25
1980–81	Rochester Americans	AHL	16	5	10	15	32	—	—	—	—	—
1980–81	Houston Apollos	CHL	33	11	17	28	31	—	—	—	—	—
1981–82	Los Angeles Kings	NHL	70	12	11	23	100	10	1	0	1	14
1982–83	Los Angeles Kings	NHL	65	16	15	31	52	—	—	—	—	—
1983–84	Los Angeles Kings	NHL	72	7	14	21	73	—	—	—	—	—
1984–85	Los Angeles Kings	NHL	73	8	10	18	55	1	0	0	0	0
1985–86	Los Angeles Kings	NHL	61	6	9	15	50	—	—	—	—	—
NHL totals			400	54	70	124	366	18	1	1	2	41

=== International ===
Year	Team	Event	GP	G	A	Pts	PIM
1979	Canada	WJC	5	0	0	0	10
Junior totals			5	0	0	0	10
