= 1978 Memorial Cup =

Canadian junior men's ice hockey championship

Tournament details
- Venue(s): Sudbury Community Arena (Sudbury, Ontario); Sault Memorial Gardens (Sault Ste. Marie, Ontario)
- Dates: May 6–13, 1978
- Teams: 3

Final positions
- Champions: New Westminster Bruins (WHL) (2nd title)

The Memorial Cup trophy

The 1978 Memorial Cup occurred May 6–13 at the Sudbury Community Arena in Sudbury, Ontario, and at the Sault Memorial Gardens in Sault Ste. Marie, Ontario. It was the 60th annual Memorial Cup competition and determined the major junior ice hockey champion of the Canadian Hockey League (CHL). Participating teams were the winners of the Ontario Major Junior Hockey League, Quebec Major Junior Hockey League and Western Hockey League which were the Peterborough Petes, Trois-Rivières Draveurs and New Westminster Bruins. New Westminster won their second Memorial Cup in a row, defeating Peterborough in the final game.

== Teams ==
QMJHL Team OMJHL Team WCHL Team Host Cities

=== New Westminster Bruins ===
The New Westminster Bruins coached by Punch McLean, represented the Western Canada Hockey League for the fourth consecutive season at the Memorial Cup. The Bruins had a mediocre regular season, nearly missing the post-season, as they finished in third place in the West Division with a 33-28-11 record, earning 77 points. New Westminster scored 345 goals during the regular season, ranking them seventh in the twelve team league. The Bruins allowed 310 goals, ranking them in third place for the fewest goals allowed. The Bruins began the post-season in a newly formed round robin format for the first round of the playoffs, in which they played eight games against other playoff teams. The Bruins finished with a 7–1 record, advancing to the West Division finals. In their series against the Victoria Cougars, the Bruins defeated them four games to one, earning a berth into a second round robin tournament against the other two division winners. New Westminster finished the round-robin with a 3–1 record, earning a berth into the President's Cup finals. In the final round, the Bruins defeated the Billings Bighorns four games to none, capturing their fourth consecutive WCHL championship, and a berth into the 1978 Memorial Cup.

New Westminster's offense was led by John Ogrodnick, who scored a team high 59 goals and 88 points in 72 games. Ogrodnick was named a co-winner for the Rookie of the Year award. Terry Kirkham finished in second in team scoring, recording 19 goals and 77 points in 71 games. Stan Smyl missed some time due to injury, however, in 53 games, he scored 29 goals and 76 points. Smyl led the Bruins in post-season scoring, scoring 14 goals and 35 points in 21 games. Doug Derkson scored 38 goals and 73 points in 70 games, in which he followed that up with a team high 15 post-season goals, while earning 27 points in 21 games. Brian Young led the Bruins on defense, scoring 14 goals and 57 points in 63 games. Carey Walker played the majority of time in goal, earning a record of 20-17-6 with a 4.45 GAA and a .883 save percentage in 47 games.

The 1978 Memorial Cup was the Bruins fourth consecutive trip to the Memorial Cup tournament. In 1975 and 1976, the Bruins lost in the final game of the tournament. In 1977, New Westminster won their first Memorial Cup, defeating the Ottawa 67's 6–5 in the final game.

=== Peterborough Petes ===
The Peterborough Petes represented the Ontario Major Junior Hockey League at the 1978 Memorial Cup. The Petes finished in second place in the Leyden Division with a 37-18-13 record, earning 87 points. The Petes offense scored 327 goals, which ranked them fifth in the twelve team league. Defensively, Peterborough allowed 273 goals, ranking them second in the OMJHL. In the first round of the playoffs, Peterborough defeated the Oshawa Generals four games to one, as well as the clubs tying a game in the six-game series, as the Petes advanced to the Leyden Division finals. In the division finals, the Petes narrowly defeated the top-ranked and defending OMJHL champions, the Ottawa 67's four games to three with a tie game. In the J. Ross Robertson Cup finals against the Emms Division champions, the Hamilton Fincups, the Petes again were pushed to the brink of elimination, as Peterborough defeated Hamilton four games to three, as well as tying a game, to capture the OMJHL championship and a berth into the 1978 Memorial Cup.

The Petes offense was led by Keith Acton, who led the club in scoring with 42 goals and 128 points in 68 games. Mark Kirton ranked second in club scoring, scoring 27 goals and 71 points in 68 games. Kirton led Peterborough in post-season scoring, scoring 12 goals and 26 points in 21 games. Mike Meeker joined the Petes midway through the season after beginning the year with the University of Wisconsin. Meeker scored 33 goals and 69 points in 44 games with Peterborough. Defenseman Greg Theberge led the blue line, scoring 13 goals and 67 points in 66 games. In goal, Ken Ellacott played the bulk of games, earning a 3.65 GAA in 55 games. Ellacott was awarded the F.W. "Dinty" Moore Trophy, awarded to the goaltender with the lowest GAA in their first season.

The 1978 Memorial Cup was the Petes third appearance in team history. At the 1959 Memorial Cup, Peterborough lost to the Winnipeg Braves in the final round. In 1972, the Petes once again lost in the final round, this time to the Cornwall Royals.

=== Trois-Rivières Draveurs ===
The Trois-Rivières Draveurs represented the Quebec Major Junior Hockey League at the 1978 Memorial Cup. The Draveurs finished with the best record in the league, going 47-18-7 and earning 101 points, capturing the Jean Rougeau Trophy. Trois-Rivières had a high-powered offense, finishing second in the league with 412 goals. The Draveurs allowed a league-low 252 goals. In the Dilio Division quarter-finals, Trois-Rivières swept the Quebec Remparts in four games. In the division finals against the Sherbrooke Castors, the Draveurs defeated the defending QMJHL champions four games to one, advancing to the President's Cup. In the final round against the Montreal Juniors, the Draveurs easily swept Montreal in four games to capture the QMJHL championship and a berth into the 1978 Memorial Cup.

Denis Pomerleau was acquired by the Draveurs early in the season in a trade with the Hull Olympiques. With Trois-Rivières, Pomerleau led the club with 63 goals and 127 points in 58 games. With both clubs, Pomerleau scored 75 goals and 148 points in 73 games to finish sixth in league scoring. Richard David finished second in team scoring with 50 goals and 111 points in 69 games. David led the Draveurs in post-season scoring, recording 17 goals and 33 points in 13 games to capture the Guy Lafleur Trophy for Playoff MVP. Normand Lefebvre scored 51 goals and 102 points in 72 games and Jean-Marc Bonamie recorded 25 goals and 101 points in 61 games to each crack the 100 point plateau for the Draveurs. Mario Simard led the defense with 25 goals and 68 points in 72 games, while rookie defenseman Normand Rochefort scored nine goals and 46 points in 72 games. Rochefort was named a co-winner for the Michel Bergeron Trophy, awarded to the Rookie of the Year in the QMJHL. In goal, Jacques Cloutier played in 71 games, earning a record of 46-17-7 with a 3.48 GAA and a .879 save percentage. The Draveurs won the Robert Lebel Trophy as the club with the lowest goals against in the QMJHL thanks to Cloutier's efforts. In the playoffs, Cloutier was 12–1 with a 3.15 GAA and .878 save percentage in 13 games.

The 1978 Memorial Cup was the first appearance by the Draveurs in team history.

== Round-robin standings ==
Pos	Team	Pld	W	L	GF	GA	
1	Peterborough Petes (OMJHL)	4	3	1	17	10	Advanced to final
2	New Westminster Bruins (WHL)	4	2	2	17	18	Advanced to final
3	Trois-Rivières Draveurs (QMJHL)	4	1	3	12	18	

== Scores ==
Round-robin

- May 6 Trois-Rivières 5-2 Peterborough
- May 7 Peterborough 7-2 New Westminster
- May 8 New Westminster 6-4 Trois-Rivières
- May 9 Peterborough 4-0 Trois-Rivières
- May 10 Peterborough 4-3 New Westminster (OT)
- May 11 New Westminster 6-3 Trois-Rivières

Final

- May 13 New Westminster 7-4 Peterborough

== Winning roster ==
Ken Berry, Doug Derkson, Jim Dobson, Boris Fistric, Bill Hobbins, Bruce Howes, Randy Irving, John-Paul Kelly, Terry Kirkham, Larry Lozinsky, Richard Martens, Scott McLeod, Neil Meadmore, Larry Melnyk, John Ogrodnick, Kent Reardon, Rick Slawson, Stan Smyl, Carl Van Harrewyn, Brian Young. Coach: Ernie McLean

== Award winners ==
- Stafford Smythe Memorial Trophy (MVP): Stan Smyl, New Westminster
- George Parsons Trophy (Sportsmanship): Mark Kirton, Peterborough
- Hap Emms Memorial Trophy (Goaltender): Ken Ellacott, Peterborough

All-star team

- Goal: Ken Ellacott, Peterborough
- Defence: Paul MacKinnon, Peterborough; Brian Young, New Westminster
- Centre: Mark Kirton, Peterborough
- Left wing: Normand Lefebvre, Trois-Rivières
- Right wing: Stan Smyl, New Westminster
