= Doug Kostynski =

Canadian ice hockey player

- Born: February 23, 1963 (age 63) Castlegar, British Columbia, Canada
- Height: 6 ft 0 in (183 cm)
- Weight: 176 lb (80 kg; 12 st 8 lb)
- Position: Centre
- Shot: Right
- Played for: New Westminster Bruins; Kamloops Junior Oilers; Brandon Wheat Kings; Boston Bruins; Hershey Bears; Moncton Golden Flames; Adirondack Red Wings; SaiPa
- National team: Canada
- NHL draft: 186th overall, 1982; Boston Bruins
- Playing career: 1979–1990

Douglas Kostynski (born February 23, 1963, in Castlegar, British Columbia) is a Canadian retired ice hockey player. He was drafted by the Boston Bruins with the 186th overall pick in the 1982 NHL entry draft. He played 15 games for the Bruins.

== Career statistics ==
			Regular season					Playoffs
Season	Team	League	GP	G	A	Pts	PIM	GP	G	A	Pts	PIM
1979–80	New Westminster Bruins	WHL	11	1	4	5	12	—	—	—	—	—
1980–81	New Westminster Bruins	WHL	64	18	40	58	51	—	—	—	—	—
1981–82	Kamloops Junior Oilers	WHL	53	39	42	81	57	3	1	0	1	0
1982–83	Brandon Wheat Kings	WHL	11	4	5	9	5	—	—	—	—	—
1982–83	Kamloops Junior Oilers	WHL	64	53	54	107	50	7	2	7	9	6
1983–84	Boston Bruins	NHL	9	3	1	4	2	—	—	—	—	—
1983–84	Hershey Bears	AHL	67	13	27	40	8	—	—	—	—	—
1984–85	Boston Bruins	NHL	6	0	0	0	2	—	—	—	—	—
1984–85	Hershey Bears	AHL	55	17	27	44	26	—	—	—	—	—
1985–86	Moncton Golden Flames	AHL	72	18	36	54	24	8	3	1	4	9
1986–87	Moncton Golden Flames	AHL	74	21	45	66	22	6	2	1	3	0
1987–88	Adirondack Red Wings	AHL	18	3	3	6	10	1	0	0	0	2
1988–89	SaiPa	Liiga	44	20	32	52	16	—	—	—	—	—
1989–90	SaiPa	Liiga	38	13	18	31	34	—	—	—	—	—
NHL totals			15	3	1	4	4	—	—	—	—	—
AHL totals			286	72	138	210	90	15	5	2	7	11
