= Wayne Babych =

Canadian ice hockey player (born 1958)

- Babych in 2005
- Born: June 6, 1958 (age 68) Edmonton, Alberta, Canada
- Height: 5 ft 11 in (180 cm)
- Weight: 195 lb (88 kg; 13 st 13 lb)
- Position: Right wing
- Shot: Right
- Played for: St. Louis Blues; Pittsburgh Penguins; Quebec Nordiques; Hartford Whalers
- National team: Canada
- NHL draft: 3rd overall, 1978; St. Louis Blues
- Playing career: 1978–1987

Wayne Joseph Babych (born June 6, 1958) is a Canadian former professional ice hockey right winger who played in the National Hockey League (NHL) for the St. Louis Blues, Pittsburgh Penguins, Quebec Nordiques, and Hartford Whalers. He is the older brother of former NHL player Dave Babych.

Babych played his junior career with the Edmonton Oil Kings and Portland Winter Hawks of the Western Canada Hockey League before being drafted 3rd overall by St. Louis in the 1978 NHL Amateur Draft. A skilled winger, he netted 20 or more goals four times in seven full NHL seasons. In 1980–81, Babych become the first 50-goal scorer in Blues franchise history. His 54 goals stood as the Blues single season record until Brett Hull's 72 goal campaign in 1989–90. Babych, Hull and Brendan Shanahan are the only players in Blues history to record 50-goal seasons.

Babych was inducted into the St. Louis Blues Hall of Fame in January 2025 along with Jim Roberts and Curtis Joseph.

== Early life ==
Babych was born on June 6, 1958, in Edmonton, Alberta, Canada to parents Edward and Tillie Babych. He is of Ukrainian descent as his grandparents are both from the Ukrainian city of Brody. Babych grew up in Edmonton alongside his twin sister Susan and younger brother Dave, while their father ran a sporting goods store in the nearby town of Vegreville.

== Career ==
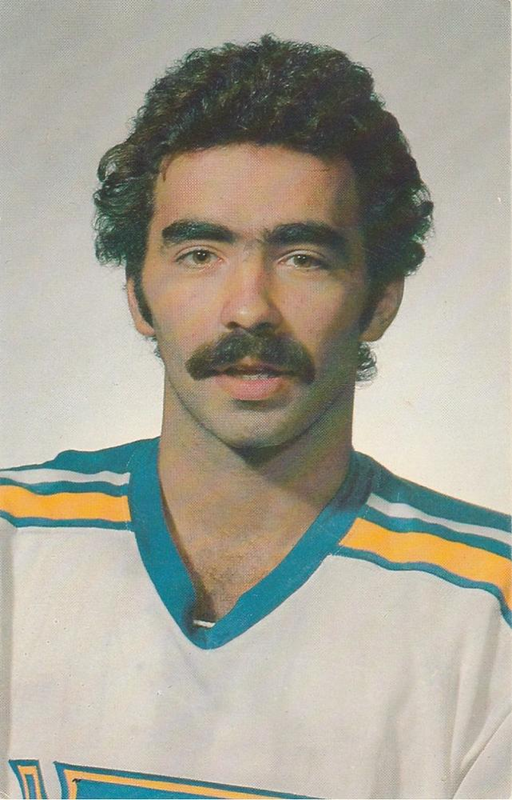
Babych in 1978 postcard for St. Louis Blues

Babych was drafted third overall by the St. Louis Blues in the 1978 NHL amateur draft. While both the Edmonton Oilers and Quebec Nordiques offered him World Hockey Association (WHA) contracts, Babych chose to sign with the Blues and play in the National Hockey League (NHL). The Blues had offered him a three-year contract, which included a $125,000 signing bonus and an option for a fourth year at $110,000. However, due to a miswording in the contract, the Blues were forced to retain him for a fourth year instead of having it as an offer. Babych played one game with the Blues in the preseason before suffering bruised ribs in his second game after blocking a shot. He eventually returned to the Blues lineup on October 3 for an exhibition game against the Los Angeles Kings. Babych began the 1978–79 season by scoring first NHL goal on October 13 against the Vancouver Canucks. Babych quickly co-led the team in scoring with five goals and eight assists through his first seven games. Three of his five goals came in his first four games. By the end of October, Babych had become a mainstay on the Blues' "Kid Line" with Bernie Federko and Brian Sutter and led the NHL in scoring with 18 points. The trio had earned their "Kid" moniker as they were all under the age of 23.

While the Blues struggled to win games, the "Kid Line" continued to find success and combined for 29 of the team's 60 total goals through the first 17 games of the season. Babych started December in a three-way tie for eighth in league scoring with 12 goals and 18 assists. On January 6, Babych broke the Blues' rookie goal scoring record with his 21st of the season but was unable to finish the game after injuring his ankle. At the time of the injury, Babych led the team with 42 points, and the "Kid Line" had combined for 127 points. He missed 13 to recover but returned to the Blues' lineup on February 13 against the Vancouver Canucks. Despite his lengthy absence, only Bobby Smith passed him in scoring among rookies. Bob Murdoch replaced Babych as the top-line winger during his absence but the original "Kid Line" was reunited once Babych returned. In his third game back, Babych broke Murphy's franchise rookie points record by tallying his 44th point of the season in a 6–6 tie with the New York Rangers. Later, on March 7, Babych tallied his 31st assist of the season to break Bob Hess's franchise rookie assist record. After finishing his rookie season with 27 goals and 36 assists, Babych ranked third in Calder Memorial Trophy voting as the NHL's Rookie of the Year.

Babych played a key role in the Blues' success in the 1979–80 season as they finished with a 34-34-12 record and clinched second place in the Smythe Division. He was reunited with his usual linemates to start the season, and recorded his first career NHL hat-trick on October 23 against the Boston Bruins. By November, Babych led the team with six points over 11 games. However, a shoulder injury on November 3 limited him to just 20 of the Blues' first 49 games. Once he returned to the lineup in January, Babych was moved onto the Blues' second line with Mike Zuke and Tony Currie.

Babych began the 1980–81 season with 10 points through seven games to help the team to a franchise-best 4–2–1 record. When Blair Chapman suffered an injury in mid-November, head coach Red Berenson placed Babych on the wing of Brian Sutter and Bernie Federko. They swiftly combined for 13 points through their first five games together before Babych suffered an injury on November 18. He missed two games to recover from the injury before returning to the Blues' lineup on November 25. In his first game back, he scored two goals against the Buffalo Sabres to lead the team with 14. Babych maintained a franchise-record-setting goal streak through the end of December and early January. Over the eight-game span, Babych recorded 11 goals and seven assists for 18 points and ranked 11th in league scoring. On January 27, 1981, Babych set a new franchise record for most goals scored by a Blues right winger in a season. He started February as the second leading goal scorer in the Blues' conference and was selected for the 1981 NHL All-Star Game following an injury to Bryan Trottier. On February 28, he passed Chuck Lefley's franchise single-season goal record by recording his 44th and 45th of the season against the Washington Capitals. His game-winning goal also ensured that the Blues qualified for the 1981 Stanley Cup playoffs. A few days later, he scored a power-play goal against the Boston Bruins to help the team establish a new franchise record of 73 power-play goals in one season. On March 8, Babych scored his 49th goal of the season to set a new Blues record of having scored a goal against 18 NHL teams in one season. On March 12, Babych became the first player in franchise history and 25th in NHL history to score 50 goals in one season. He also became the sixth player in franchise history to record 100 career goals with the team. While Jörgen Pettersson broke his rookie records, Babych set new franchise records with 54 goals and 42 assists for 96 points. His goals, assists, and points totals were the most ever scored by a right-winger in Blues history.

Babych and the Blues struggled to match their success the following season. The team won four of their first 12 games of the 1981–82 season while Babych remained sidelined due to a shoulder injury. Despite returning to the lineup, Babych described the entire season as being "marred by more nagging, frustrating injuries than he cares to remember."

== Personal life ==
Babych married Shelley Buffie in a double wedding ceremony with his brother Dave and Shelley's twin sister on July 3, 1982. After retiring, Babych ran a water slide company before building and operating numerous golf courses in Winnipeg with his brother. Later, he and his brother began working with the Canadian Friends of Hockey in Ukraine organization to help disadvantaged Ukrainian children play ice hockey.

== Career statistics ==
			Regular Season					Playoffs
Season	Team	League	GP	G	A	Pts	PIM	GP	G	A	Pts	PIM
1973–74	Edmonton Oil Kings	WCHL	1	0	1	1	0	—	—	—	—	—
1973–74	Edmonton Mets	AJHL	56	20	18	38	68	—	—	—	—	—
1974–75	Edmonton Oil Kings	WCHL	68	19	17	36	157	—	—	—	—	—
1975–76	Edmonton Oil Kings	WCHL	61	32	46	78	98	5	2	1	3	23
1976–77	Portland Winter Hawks	WCHL	71	50	62	112	76	10	2	6	8	10
1977–78	Portland Winter Hawks	WCHL	68	50	71	121	218	8	4	4	8	19
1978–79	St. Louis Blues	NHL	67	27	36	63	75	—	—	—	—	—
1979–80	St. Louis Blues	NHL	59	26	35	61	49	3	1	2	3	2
1980–81	St. Louis Blues	NHL	78	54	42	96	93	11	2	0	2	8
1981–82	St. Louis Blues	NHL	51	19	25	44	51	7	3	2	5	8
1982–83	St. Louis Blues	NHL	71	16	23	39	62	—	—	—	—	—
1983–84	St. Louis Blues	NHL	70	13	29	42	52	10	1	4	5	4
1984–85	Pittsburgh Penguins	NHL	65	20	34	54	35	—	—	—	—	—
1985–86	Pittsburgh Penguins	NHL	2	0	0	0	0	—	—	—	—	—
1985–86	Quebec Nordiques	NHL	15	6	5	11	18	—	—	—	—	—
1985–86	Hartford Whalers	NHL	37	11	17	28	59	10	0	1	1	2
1986–87	Binghamton Whalers	AHL	78	9	33	42	35	14	2	7	9	2
1986–87	Hartford Whalers	NHL	4	0	0	0	4	—	—	—	—	—
NHL totals			519	192	246	438	498	41	7	9	16	24
WCHL totals			269	151	197	348	549	23	8	11	19	52

== Awards ==
- WCHL First All-Star Team – 1977 & 1978

== See also ==
- List of family relations in the NHL

Awards and achievements
Preceded by Scott Campbell	St. Louis Blues first-round draft pick 1978	Succeeded by Perry Turnbull
