= Mark Lofthouse =

Canadian ice hockey player

- Born: April 21, 1957 (age 68) New Westminster, British Columbia, Canada
- Height: 6 ft 2 in (188 cm)
- Weight: 195 lb (88 kg; 13 st 13 lb)
- Position: Right wing
- Shot: Right
- Played for: Washington Capitals; Detroit Red Wings
- NHL draft: 21st overall, 1977; Washington Capitals
- WHA draft: 28th overall, 1977; Winnipeg Jets
- Playing career: 1977–1989

Mark Allen Lofthouse (born April 21, 1957) is a Canadian former professional ice hockey right winger.

Drafted in 1977 by both the Washington Capitals of the National Hockey League and the Winnipeg Jets of the World Hockey Association, Lofthouse also played 40 games for the Detroit Red Wings.

Lofthouse suited up for the Capitals again on December 31, 2010 for an alumni game against the Pittsburgh Penguins. The game was held on Heinz Field on the day before the NHL Winter Classic and Lofthouse scored in the first period, tying the game.

== Career statistics ==
			Regular season					Playoffs
Season	Team	League	GP	G	A	Pts	PIM	GP	G	A	Pts	PIM
1973–74	Kelowna Buckaroos	BCHL	62	44	42	86	59	—	—	—	—	—
1974–75	New Westminster Bruins	WCHL	61	36	28	64	53	17	5	5	10	26
1974–75	New Westminster Bruins	MC	—	—	—	—	—	3	1	3	4	2
1975–76	New Westminster Bruins	WCHL	72	68	48	116	55	17	9	12	21	22
1975–76	New Westminster Bruins	MC	—	—	—	—	—	4	4	2	6	2
1976–77	New Westminster Bruins	WCHL	70	54	58	112	59	14	10	8	18	19
1976–77	New Westminster Bruins	MC	—	—	—	—	—	6	6	4	10	10
1977–78	Washington Capitals	NHL	18	2	1	3	8	—	—	—	—	—
1977–78	Hershey Bears	AHL	35	8	6	14	39	—	—	—	—	—
1977–78	Salt Lake Golden Eagles	CHL	13	0	1	1	4	5	0	1	1	6
1978–79	Washington Capitals	NHL	52	13	10	23	10	—	—	—	—	—
1978–79	Hershey Bears	AHL	16	7	7	14	6	4	0	1	1	2
1979–80	Washington Capitals	NHL	68	15	18	33	20	—	—	—	—	—
1979–80	Hershey Bears	AHL	9	7	3	10	6	—	—	—	—	—
1980–81	Washington Capitals	NHL	3	1	1	2	4	—	—	—	—	—
1980–81	Hershey Bears	AHL	72	48	55	103	131	10	6	9	15	24
1981–82	Detroit Red Wings	NHL	12	3	4	7	13	—	—	—	—	—
1981–82	Adirondack Red Wings	AHL	69	33	38	71	75	5	2	3	5	2
1982–83	Detroit Red Wings	NHL	28	8	4	12	18	—	—	—	—	—
1982–83	Adirondack Red Wings	AHL	39	27	18	45	20	—	—	—	—	—
1983–84	New Haven Nighthawks	AHL	79	37	64	101	45	—	—	—	—	—
1984–85	Zürcher SC	NDA	30	24	24	48	—	—	—	—	—	—
1984–85	New Haven Nighthawks	AHL	12	11	4	15	4	—	—	—	—	—
1985–86	New Haven Nighthawks	AHL	70	32	35	67	56	5	2	1	3	0
1986–87	New Haven Nighthawks	AHL	47	18	27	45	34	4	0	1	1	2
1987–88	Hershey Bears	AHL	51	21	21	42	64	10	6	5	11	6
1988–89	Hershey Bears	AHL	74	32	47	79	71	12	3	4	7	20
NHL totals			181	42	38	80	73	—	—	—	—	—
AHL totals			573	281	325	606	551	50	19	24	43	56

== Awards ==
- WCHL Second All-Star Team – 1977
