= Rick Shinske =

Canadian ice hockey player (1955–2012)

- Born: May 31, 1955 Weyburn, Saskatchewan, Canada
- Died: October 23, 2012 (aged 57) Victoria, British Columbia, Canada
- Height: 5 ft 11 in (180 cm)
- Weight: 165 lb (75 kg; 11 st 11 lb)
- Position: Centre
- Shot: Left
- Played for: Cleveland Barons; St. Louis Blues
- NHL draft: 111th overall, 1975; California Golden Seals
- WHA draft: 171st overall, 1975; Edmonton Oilers
- Playing career: 1972–1983

Richard Charles Shinske (May 31, 1955 – October 23, 2012) was a Canadian professional ice hockey forward who played 63 games in the National Hockey League for the Cleveland Barons and St. Louis Blues. Shinske played for the New Westminster Bruins of the WHL. He is the son of Ernie 'Punch" McLean's longtime partner and former general manager of the Estevan Bruins, Bill Shinske. He has a wife, Janice, with whom he a son, Grady and a daughter, Bailey. He died of cancer in 2012.

== Career statistics ==
=== Regular season and playoffs ===
			Regular season					Playoffs
Season	Team	League	GP	G	A	Pts	PIM	GP	G	A	Pts	PIM
1971–72	Kamloops Rockets	BCHL	48	3	9	12	74	—	—	—	—	—
1972–73	Kamloops Rockets	BCHL	61	28	90	118	97	—	—	—	—	—
1972–73	Calgary Centennials	WCHL	1	0	0	0	0	—	—	—	—	—
1973–74	Calgary Centennials	WCHL	67	12	43	55	18	13	1	8	9	4
1974–75	Calgary Centennials	WCHL	17	3	13	16	18	—	—	—	—	—
1974–75	New Westminster Bruins	WCHL	48	20	44	64	54	18	7	11	18	18
1974–75	New Westminster Bruins	M-Cup	—	—	—	—	—	3	2	0	2	2
1975–76	New Westminster Bruins	WCHL	70	52	91	143	86	17	7	23	30	26
1975–76	New Westminster Bruins	M-Cup	—	—	—	—	—	4	2	7	9	2
1975–76	Salt Lake Golden Eagles	CHL	4	0	2	2	0	—	—	—	—	—
1976–77	Cleveland Barons	NHL	5	0	0	0	2	—	—	—	—	—
1977–78	Phoenix Roadrunners	CHL	14	3	8	11	0	—	—	—	—	—
1977–78	Binghamton Dusters	AHL	17	8	9	17	2	—	—	—	—	—
1978–79	St. Louis Blues	NHL	11	0	4	4	2	—	—	—	—	—
1978–79	Salt Lake Golden Eagles	CHL	66	22	66	88	31	10	3	7	10	6
1979–80	Adirondack Red Wings	AHL	78	22	58	80	20	5	0	3	3	0
1980–81	Adirondack Red Wings	AHL	46	20	35	55	46	—	—	—	—	—
1981–82	Adirondack Red Wings	AHL	35	10	23	33	0	5	2	4	6	0
1982–83	New Haven Nighthawks	AHL	45	10	27	37	12	12	3	6	9	2
AHL totals			221	70	152	222	80	22	5	13	18	2
NHL totals			63	5	16	21	10	—	—	—	—	—

Preceded by Doug Palazzari	CHL Leading Scorer; 1978–79	Succeeded by Doug Palazzari
