= Barry Beck =

Canadian ice hockey player and coach

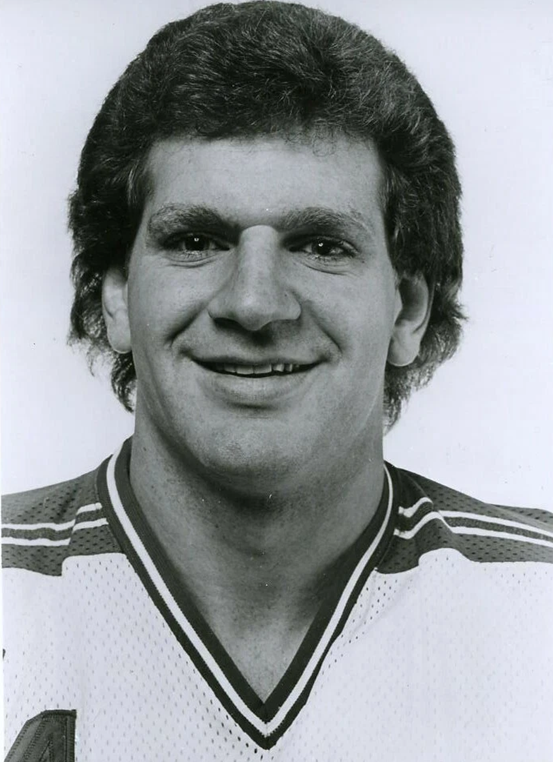
- Beck in 1981 photo
- Born: June 3, 1957 (age 69) Vancouver, British Columbia, Canada
- Height: 6 ft 3 in (191 cm)
- Weight: 215 lb (98 kg; 15 st 5 lb)
- Position: Defence
- Shot: Left
- Played for: Colorado Rockies; New York Rangers; Los Angeles Kings
- National team: Canada
- NHL draft: 2nd overall, 1977; Colorado Rockies
- WHA draft: 2nd overall, 1977; Calgary Cowboys
- Playing career: 1977–1990

Barry David Beck (born June 3, 1957) is a Canadian former professional ice hockey player and currently the head coach of the Hong Kong national team. Beck was selected second overall in both the 1977 NHL amateur draft and the 1977 WHA Amateur Draft from the New Westminster Bruins. Beck helped the Bruins win the 1977 Memorial Cup, and was awarded the Stafford Smythe Memorial Trophy as the Most Valuable Player of the tournament. He opted to move to the NHL over the WHA, and began his career with the Colorado Rockies. He also played for the New York Rangers and Los Angeles Kings over the course of his career, and retired in 1990.

== Junior career ==
Beck played one game with the Kamloops Chiefs in 1973-74 before being traded to the New Westminster Bruins of the Western Hockey League (WHL), in June 1974 for Barry Melrose, Gary Plamondon, and Dan Clark. He excelled for three seasons at New Westminster. In 1975-76 he turned in a dominant effort scoring 19 goals and 99 points while also racking up a team high 325 minutes in penalties. The following year his point totals dipped to 62 but helped the Bruins capture the 1977 Memorial Cup, and Beck was chosen as the Most Valuable Player of the tournament. After ending his junior career on a high note, Beck was selected second overall in the 1977 NHL amateur draft by the Colorado Rockies.

== Colorado Rockies ==
Beck exploded onto the NHL scene with the Rockies, racking up 22 goals (a higher total than he had ever achieved in junior) which set an NHL rookie record for goals by a defenceman. More importantly, the Rockies secured their first-ever playoff berth. Beck capped off the successful season by being the runner up to Mike Bossy for the Calder Memorial Trophy as the league's top first year player. Beck thoroughly enjoyed his time in the Mile High State. "There wasn't any pressure on me (in Colorado)," Beck recalled. "For one thing, there was hardly any media coverage, and there weren't very many fans. The first year was great. We'd just party and have a good time. We got to go to all the nice bars, I could buy a nice car, and we had a great apartment (he roomed with Randy Pierce). I think when you are 21 that is about as good as it can get. When we made the playoffs that year, it was even more exciting!"

During his second year in Colorado, Beck's point totals dipped and the team failed to make the playoffs. Beck approached the Rockies management about renegotiating his contract based on his successful rookie campaign. Just ten games into his third season, the 21-year old was shocked to find out he had been traded to the New York Rangers in a blockbuster trade that shipped five players to Colorado. Beck told the story of his trade to the Rangers: "One time, in Colorado, (coach) Don Cherry's dog Blue came waddling into our locker room. He came in and, you know how those dogs do it, he rubbed his butt on the floor - right in front of my locker, in the area I used to do push-ups. So I gave Blue a little whack with my stick and he ran yelping down the hall back to Don's office. Then Don came in and asked who did it? We kind of looked around, said we didn't know. The next day I got traded to New York." The Rangers acquired Beck on November 2, 1979, in exchange for Pat Hickey, Lucien DeBlois, Mike McEwen, Dean Turner and future considerations.

== New York Rangers ==
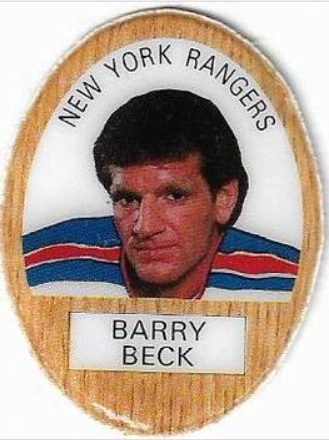
Beck on a 1983 sticker

After toiling in relative anonymity in Colorado, Beck was excited to join one of the NHL's oldest franchises. "When I got to New York, I thought: 'This is what hockey is all about. Playing in a historic arena like Madison Square Garden in a city like New York City.' You have to be consistently good every night as a player, instead of every other night. The highlight memory was putting on a Rangers jersey and skating out on the Garden ice for the first time." Beck scored a goal against the Los Angeles Kings in his first game at Madison Square Garden and went on to have an impressive first season on Broadway, putting up 59 points in 61 games. In 1980, his second year with the Rangers, Beck was named captain of the club but the 75 games he played that season would be the high water mark for his time with the Rangers. During the 1981–82 season, Beck separated his shoulder which would prove to be a recurring issue. He had more injury woes the following year and required surgery in 1984. The 1985–86 season saw him limited to just 25 games. When he did play, Beck never approached the lofty offensive totals he managed in Colorado or in his first season with the Rangers, something that was not lost on broadcaster Bill Chadwick, who infamously urged him to shoot the puck more often. The phrase, "Shoot the puck, Barry" is still known by many Rangers fans to this day.

Beck's injury-riddled 1985–86 season would end up being his last in New York. At the end of the season, nursing a bum shoulder and frustrated with Ranger coach Ted Sator, Beck walked away from the club citing "philosophical differences" with Sator, who had also clashed with Rangers Mark Pavelich, Reijo Ruotsalainen, Pierre Larouche and Walt Poddubny. "There are philosophical differences between Coach Ted Sator and myself,' Beck said in a statement issued through his agent. 'This does not necessarily mean I'm retiring, but at present I don't want to play hockey in the upcoming season." When Rangers General Manager Phil Esposito fired Sator on November 21, 1986, he invited Beck to return to the club but he declined. "Phil's announcement today does nothing to change my decision to sit out this season. However, as I have said before, I continue to leave the door open for a possible return to the team." The following season, after spending a year and a half away from the game letting his injured shoulder heal, Beck returned to the Rangers for the 1987-88 campaign. During training camp, in a pre-season game against the Winnipeg Jets, Beck took a hit in the corner and "felt it pop right away. I heard noise." At the hospital, his fears were confirmed, as he had suffered damage to the tissue and ligaments around his shoulder. "The strength of my game is strength," Beck said while announcing his retirement from the game at age 30. "This latest injury would have taken that away from me. And that's the only way I know how to play."

== Los Angeles Kings ==
In August 1989, after three years on the sidelines and with his shoulder fully recovered, the 32-year old Beck announced he wanted to return to the National Hockey League. However, his return would not happen in New York as Beck indicated he wanted to be closer to his home in Vancouver. On September 1, 1989, the Los Angeles Kings sent a fourth round draft pick to the Rangers to secure his rights and he joined the Wayne Gretzky-led Kings for the 1989–90 season. Beck struggled with the Kings and eventually found himself being used sparingly. Kings General Manager Rogie Vachon, who had acquired Beck and inked him to a one-year deal, felt he lacked the foot speed to play in the up tempo Smythe Division. "He has been frustrated going in and out of the lineup," Vachon said. "Because he may not have had the speed, he compensated by playing conservatively." Beck took issue with this assessment saying "They told me I couldn't handle it. If that's what they're thinking, maybe they've got to go with it. I didn't think I was all that bad." On March 7, with the season winding down, Beck once again announced his retirement.

Beck lives and coaches in Hong Kong and was the Hong Kong men's national ice hockey team head coach. As of 2013, he was the General Manager (Coach) with the Hong Kong Academy of Ice Hockey.

== Legacy ==
In the 2009 book 100 Ranger Greats, the authors ranked Beck at No. 62 all-time of the 901 New York Rangers who had played during the team's first 82 seasons.

== Career statistics ==
=== Regular season and playoffs ===
			Regular season					Playoffs
Season	Team	League	GP	G	A	Pts	PIM	GP	G	A	Pts	PIM
1973–74	Langley Lords	BCHL	63	8	28	36	329	—	—	—	—	—
1973–74	Kamloops Chiefs	WCHL	1	0	0	0	0	—	—	—	—	—
1974–75	Kamloops Chiefs	WCHL	1	0	0	0	0	—	—	—	—	—
1974–75	New Westminster Bruins	WCHL	58	9	33	42	162	18	4	9	13	52
1974–75	New Westminster Bruins	M-Cup	—	—	—	—	—	3	0	3	3	11
1975–76	New Westminster Bruins	WCHL	68	19	80	99	325	17	3	9	12	58
1975–76	New Westminster Bruins	M-Cup	—	—	—	—	—	4	1	3	4	13
1976–77	New Westminster Bruins	WCHL	61	16	46	62	167	12	4	6	10	39
1976–77	New Westminster Bruins	M-Cup	—	—	—	—	—	5	3	5	8	13
1977–78	Colorado Rockies	NHL	75	22	38	60	89	2	0	1	1	0
1978–79	Colorado Rockies	NHL	63	14	28	42	91	—	—	—	—	—
1979–80	Colorado Rockies	NHL	10	1	5	6	8	—	—	—	—	—
1979–80	New York Rangers	NHL	61	14	45	59	98	9	1	4	5	6
1980–81	New York Rangers	NHL	75	11	23	34	231	14	5	8	13	32
1981–82	New York Rangers	NHL	60	9	29	38	111	10	1	5	6	14
1982–83	New York Rangers	NHL	66	12	22	34	112	9	2	4	6	8
1983–84	New York Rangers	NHL	72	9	27	36	132	4	1	0	1	6
1984–85	New York Rangers	NHL	56	7	19	26	65	3	0	1	1	11
1985–86	New York Rangers	NHL	25	4	8	12	24	—	—	—	—	—
1989–90	Los Angeles Kings	NHL	52	1	7	8	53	—	—	—	—	—
NHL totals			615	104	251	355	1014	51	10	23	33	77

=== International ===
Year	Team	Event	GP	G	A	Pts	PIM
1981	Canada	CC	7	0	0	0	2
Senior totals			7	0	0	0	2

== Awards ==
- WCHL First All-Star Team – 1976 & 1977

Awards and achievements
Preceded by Paul Gardner	Colorado Rockies first-round draft pick 1977	Succeeded by Mike Gillis
Sporting positions
Preceded by Walt Tkaczuk	New York Rangers captain 1981–86	Succeeded by Ron Greschner
