= 1977 Memorial Cup =

Canadian junior men's ice hockey championship

Tournament details
- Venue(s): Pacific Coliseum (Vancouver, British Columbia)
- Dates: May 8–14, 1977
- Teams: 3

Final positions
- Champions: New Westminster Bruins (WHL) (1st title)

The Memorial Cup trophy

The 1977 Memorial Cup occurred May 8–14 at the Pacific Coliseum in Vancouver, British Columbia. It was the 59th annual Memorial Cup competition and determined the major junior ice hockey champion of the Canadian Hockey League (CHL). Participating teams were the winners of the Ontario Major Junior Hockey League, Quebec Major Junior Hockey League and Western Hockey League which were the Ottawa 67's, Sherbrooke Castors and New Westminster Bruins. New Westminster won their first Memorial Cup, defeating Ottawa in the final game.

== Teams ==
QMJHL Team OMJHL Team WCHL Team Host City

=== New Westminster Bruins ===
The New Westminster Bruins coached by Punch McLean, represented the Western Canada Hockey League at the 1977 Memorial Cup. This marked the Bruins third consecutive appearance at the tournament. The Bruins finished the 1976-77 season in first place in the West Division with a 47–14–11, earning 105 points. The high-scoring team earned 363 goals during the season, which ranked them second in the WCHL. The Bruins were also the top ranked defensive club in the league, allowing only 216 goals. In the post-season, the Bruins defeated the Victoria Cougars in a four-game sweep during the WCHL quarter-finals. In the WCHL semi-finals, New Westminster defeated the Portland Winter Hawks four games to one, earning a trip to the final round. In the President's Cup finals against the top ranked Brandon Wheat Kings, New Westminster defeated the Wheat Kings four games to one to win their third consecutive WCHL title, earning a berth into the 1977 Memorial Cup.

The Bruins offense was led by Mark Lofthouse, who scored 54 goals and 112 points in 70 games, ranking seventh in league scoring. Lofthouse was a top prospect heading into the 1977 NHL entry draft, where he would be selected by the Washington Capitals with the 21st overall pick. Lofthouse continued his hot scoring in the playoffs, scoring a team high 10 goals in 14 games. Defenseman Brad Maxwell was another to prospect on the Bruins. In 70 games, Maxwell scored 21 goals and 79 points. Maxwell led the club in post-season scoring with seven goals and 22 points in 14 games. He would be selected by the Minnesota North Stars in the first round, seventh overall at the 1977 NHL Entry Draft. Defenseman Barry Beck was another highly sought prospect for the Bruins. In 61 games, Beck scored 16 goals and 62 points. At the upcoming 1977 NHL Entry Draft, Beck was selected second overall by the Colorado Rockies. Beck was named the Top Defenseman in the league. Stan Smyl scored 35 goals and 66 points in 71 games, as he began getting attention for the 1978 NHL entry draft. Ray Creasy was acquired from the Flin Flon Bombers early in the season. In 48 games, Creasy scored 30 goals and 66 points. In goal, Blaine Peterson appeared in 46 games, earning a record of 26-10-4 with a 3.33 GAA and a .898 save percentage.

The 1977 Memorial Cup was the Bruins third trip to the tournament in team history. In 1975, New Westminster lost to the Toronto Marlboros in the final game. In 1976, the Bruins returned to the final game of the tournament, where they lost to the Hamilton Fincups.

=== Ottawa 67's ===
The Ottawa 67's represented the Ontario Major Junior Hockey League at the 1977 Memorial Cup. The 67's were the top team in the Leyden Division, earning a record of 38–23–5, getting 81 points and winning the Leyden Trophy. Ottawa scored 348 goals during the season, ranking them fourth in the OMJHL. The 67's allowed 288 goals, which ranked them fifth in the league. During the post-season, the 67's defeated the Sault Ste. Marie Greyhounds four games to zero, with a tie, during the Leyden Division semi-finals. In the next round, Ottawa was pushed to the limit by the Kingston Canadians, as they won the series four games to three, with another game tied, during the Leyden Division finals. The 67's faced the London Knights for the J. Ross Robertson Cup. Ottawa defeated London four games to two to capture the OMJHL championship, earning a berth into the 1977 Memorial Cup.

Bobby Smith led the 67's offence, scoring a team high 65 goals and 135 points in 64 games, finishing third in league scoring. In 19 playoff games, Smith scored 16 goals and 32 points to lead the club. Smith became a top prospect for the 1978 NHL Entry Draft after his spectacular season. Tom McDonell scored 35 goals and 89 points in 66 games to finish second in club scoring, while Tim Higgins also scored 35 goals, while earning 87 points in 66 games. Defenceman Doug Wilson was another top prospect on the 67's. Wilson scored 25 goals and 79 points in 48 games. He was selected by the Chicago Black Hawks with the sixth overall pick in the 1977 NHL Entry Draft. Bob Daly was the 67's starting goaltender, however, the London Knights loaned their goaltender, Pat Riggin, to Ottawa for the tournament.

The 1977 Memorial Cup was the first appearance by the 67's in team history.

=== Sherbrooke Castors ===
The Sherbrooke Castors represented the Quebec Major Junior Hockey League at the 1977 Memorial Cup. The Castors finished in first place in the Lebel Division with a record of 40–23–9, earning 89 points. The Castors scored 392 goals during the regular season, ranking them second in the league. The club allowed 311 goals, the third fewest in the QMJHL. In the post-season, the Castors had an early scare, as the Laval National pushed the Castors to a seventh game before Sherbrooke won the series four games to three during the QMJHL quarter-finals. In the QMJHL semi-finals, the Castors defeated the Cornwall Royals four games to one, with another game ending in a tie, advancing to the league finals. In the final round, Sherbrooke defeated the top ranked Quebec Remparts four games to one to win the President's Cup and earn a berth into the 1977 Memorial Cup.

The Castors offense was led by Jere Gillis, as he emerged as one of the top prospects for the upcoming 1977 NHL Entry Draft. Gillis scored 55 goals and 140 points in 72 games, finishing in sixth in league scoring. Ron Carter scored a team high 77 goals, and finished second in team scoring with 127 points in 72 games. Carter led the Castors with 12 goals and 30 points in 18 playoff games. Seventeen year old rookie Rick Vaive scored 51 goals and 110 points in 68 games, winning the Michel Bergeron Trophy, which is awarded to the QMJHL Rookie of the Year. Richard Sevigny was the Castors starting goaltender. In 64 games, he earned a record of 34-18-9 with a GAA of 4.14 and a save percentage of .863.

The 1977 Memorial Cup was the Castors second appearance at the tournament. At the 1975 Memorial Cup, Sherbrooke finished in third place after going winless in two games.

== Round-robin standings ==
Pos	Team	Pld	W	L	GF	GA	
1	Ottawa 67's (OMJHL)	4	3	1	21	13	Advanced to final
2	New Westminster Bruins (WHL)	4	3	1	18	14	Advanced to final
3	Sherbrooke Castors (QMJHL)	4	0	4	7	19	

== Scores ==
Round-robin

- May 8 New Westminster 7–6 Ottawa
- May 9 New Westminster 4–2 Sherbrooke
- May 10 Ottawa 6–1 Sherbrooke
- May 11 Ottawa 4–3 New Westminster (OT)
- May 12 New Westminster 4–2 Sherbrooke
- May 13 Ottawa 5–2 Sherbrooke

Final

- May 14 New Westminster 6–5 Ottawa

== Winning roster ==
Bruce Andres, Barry Beck, Jerry Bell, Randy Betty, Ray Creasy, Larry Dean, Doug Derkson, Don Hobbins, John-Paul Kelly, Mark Lofthouse, Brad Maxwell, Dave Orleski, Blaine Peterson, Randy Rudnyk, Stan Smyl, Carl Van Harrewyn, Carey Walker, Brian Young, Miles Zaharko. Coach: Ernie McLean

== Award winners ==
- Stafford Smythe Memorial Trophy (MVP): Barry Beck, New Westminster
- George Parsons Trophy (Sportsmanship): Bobby Smith, Ottawa
- Hap Emms Memorial Trophy (Goaltender): Pat Riggin, Ottawa

All-star team

- Goal: Pat Riggin, Ottawa
- Defence: Barry Beck, New Westminster; Brad Maxwell, New Westminster
- Centre: Bobby Smith, Ottawa
- Left wing: Jere Gillis, Sherbrooke
- Right wing: Mark Lofthouse, New Westminster
