= 1977–78 WCHL season =

Junior ice hockey season

- League: Western Hockey League
- Sport: Ice hockey
- Teams: 12

Regular season
- Season champions: Brandon Wheat Kings (2)
- Season MVP: Ryan Walter (Seattle Breakers)
- Top scorer: Brian Propp (Brandon Wheat Kings)

Playoffs
- Finals champions: New Westminster Bruins (4)
- Runners-up: Billings Bighorns

WHL seasons
- 1976–77 1978–79

1977–78 CHL season
- League: Canadian Hockey League
- Sport: Ice hockey
- Teams: 34

OMJHL

QMJHL

WCHL

Memorial Cup
- Finals champions: New Westminster Bruins (WCHL) (2nd title)
- Runners-up: Peterborough Petes (OMJHL)

The 1977–78 WCHL season was the 12th season of the Western Canada Hockey League (WCHL), featuring twelve teams and a 72-game regular season. The Brandon Wheat Kings won their second consecutive regular season title, topping the standings with 46 wins. In the playoffs, the New Westminster Bruins solidified their dynasty in winning their fourth consecutive President's Cup, defeating the Billings Bighorns—the first American-based club to make the league playoff final—in the championship series. The Bruins earned a berth in the 1978 Memorial Cup tournament, and there won the club's second consecutive Memorial Cup title.

The season was the first for a trio of franchises. The Calgary Centennials relocated to Billings, Montana and became the Bighorns. However, Calgary was not left without a team as the Winnipeg Monarchs relocated there and became the Calgary Wranglers. Finally, the Kamloops Chiefs relocated to Seattle and became the Seattle Breakers, bringing the number of American clubs in the league up to three.

== Team changes ==
- The Calgary Centennials relocated to Billings, Montana, becoming the Billings Bighorns.
- The Winnipeg Monarchs relocated to Calgary, Alberta, becoming the Calgary Wranglers.
- The Kamloops Chiefs relocated to Seattle, Washington, becoming the Seattle Breakers.

== Regular season ==
=== Final standings ===
East Division
Pos	Team	Pld	W	L	T	GF	GA	Pts
1	x – Brandon Wheat Kings	72	46	12	14	424	299	106
2	x – Flin Flon Bombers	72	33	30	9	396	380	75
3	x – Regina Pats	72	29	38	5	363	405	63
4	Saskatoon Blades	72	20	50	2	340	460	42

x – qualified for playoffs

Central Division
Pos	Team	Pld	W	L	T	GF	GA	Pts
1	x – Lethbridge Broncos	72	36	29	7	341	328	79
2	x – Billings Bighorns	72	32	31	9	342	336	73
3	x – Medicine Hat Tigers	72	22	41	9	293	365	53
4	Calgary Wranglers	72	18	40	14	303	404	50

x – qualified for playoffs

West Division
Pos	Team	Pld	W	L	T	GF	GA	Pts
1	x – Portland Winter Hawks	72	41	20	11	361	296	93
2	x – Victoria Cougars	72	34	29	9	365	333	77
3	x – New Westminster Bruins	72	33	28	11	345	310	77
4	Seattle Breakers	72	32	28	12	359	316	76

x – qualified for playoffs

=== Scoring leaders ===
Note: GP = Games played; G = Goals; A = Assists; Pts = Points; PIM = Penalties in minutes

Player	Team	GP	G	A	Pts	PIM
Brian Propp	Brandon Wheat Kings	70	70	112	182	200
Ray Allison	Brandon Wheat Kings	71	73	86	160	254
Steve Tambellini	Lethbridge Broncos	66	75	80	155	32
Errol Rausse	Seattle Breakers	72	62	92	154	60
Bill Derlago	Brandon Wheat Kings	52	89	63	152	105
Geordie Robertson	Victoria Cougars	61	64	72	136	85
Gerald Minor	Regina Pats	66	54	75	129	236
Merlin Malinowski	Medicine Hat Tigers	72	48	78	126	131
Ryan Walter	Seattle Breakers	62	54	71	125	148
Wayne Babych	Portland Winter Hawks	68	50	71	121	218

== 1978 WCHL Playoffs ==
=== Division Semi-finals ===
Round Robin format

- Flin Flon (4–4) advanced
- Regina (4–4) advanced
- Brandon (4–4) eliminated
- Billings (6–2) advanced
- Medicine Hat (3–5) advanced
- Lethbridge (3–5) eliminated
- New Westminster (7–1) advanced
- Victoria (4–4) advanced
- Portland (1–7) eliminated

=== Division Finals ===
- Flin Flon defeated Regina 4 games to 1
- Billings defeated Medicine Hat 4 games to 0
- New Westminster defeated Victoria 4 games to 1

=== League semi-finals ===
Round Robin format

- Billings (3–1) advanced
- New Westminster (3–1) advanced
- Flin Flon (0–4) eliminated

=== WHL Championship ===
- New Westminster defeated Billings 4 games to 0

== All-Star game ==
On January 18, the West All-Stars defeated the East All-Stars 2–1 at Regina, Saskatchewan before a crowd of 2,814.

== WHL awards ==
Most Valuable Player: Ryan Walter, Seattle Breakers
Top Scorer: Brian Propp, Brandon Wheat Kings
Most Sportsmanlike Player: Steve Tambellini, Lethbridge Broncos
Top Defenseman: Brad McCrimmon, Brandon Wheat Kings
Rookie of the Year: (tie) Keith Brown, Portland Winter Hawks and John Ogrodnick, New Westminster Bruins
Top Goaltender: Bart Hunter, Portland Winter Hawks
Coach of the Year: (tie) Dave King, Billings Bighorns and Jack Shupe, Victoria Cougars
Regular season champions: Brandon Wheat Kings

== All-Star teams ==
	First Team		Second Team	
Goal	Tim Thomlison	Billings Bighorns	Bart Hunter	Portland Winter Hawks
Defense	Brad McCrimmon	Brandon Wheat Kings	Dwayne Lowdermilk	Seattle Breakers
Defense	Larry Playfair	Portland Winter Hawks	Keith Brown (tie)	Portland Winter Hawks
Defense	-	-	Brian Young (tie)	New Westminster Bruins
Center	Ryan Walter	Seattle Breakers	Bill Derlago	Brandon Wheat Kings
Left Wing	Brian Propp	Brandon Wheat Kings	Errol Rausse	Seattle Breakers
Right Wing	Wayne Babych	Portland Winter Hawks	Ray Allison	Brandon Wheat Kings

== See also ==
- 1978 NHL entry draft
- 1977 in sports
- 1978 in sports

Preceded by 1976–77 WCHL season	WHL seasons	Succeeded by 1978–79 WHL season
