= Punch McLean =

Canadian ice hockey coach (1932–2026)

- Born: Ernest John Vincent McLean; November 3, 1932; Estevan, Saskatchewan, Canada
- Died: May 8, 2026 (aged 93) near Dease Lake, British Columbia, Canada
- Occupation: Ice hockey coach
- Known for: New Westminster Bruins
- Awards: Dunc McCallum Memorial Trophy (1976); BC Hockey Hall of Fame (2005)

Ernest John Vincent "Punch" McLean (November 3, 1932 – May 8, 2026) was a Canadian ice hockey coach. He led the New Westminster Bruins to four consecutive President's Cup titles, and won consecutive 1977 and 1978 Memorial Cup championships. After his 16 seasons in the Western Hockey League (WHL), McLean placed second all-time among WHL coaches with 1,067 games coached.

== Early life ==
Ernest John Vincent McLean was born in a coal mine in Estevan, Saskatchewan, on November 3, 1932, due to the temperature in his parents' house being too low. McLean played midget, juvenile, and intermediate ice hockey growing up and earned an invitation to a New York Rangers training camp when he was 17.

== Career ==
After the Rangers training camp, McLean joined the Humboldt Indians in the SJHL under coach Scotty Munro and eventually became an assistant. In 1966, the Canadian Major Junior Hockey League evolved into the Western Canada Junior Hockey League (WCHL). McLean eventually replaced Monroe as head coach and became co-owner of the Estevan Bruins. On April 18, 1971, after the Estevan Bruins had been eliminated from the WHL playoffs, McLean boarded a single-engine airplane heading for Yorkton, Saskatchewan. The plane failed to make it to Yorkton as a result of a crash which took his left eye. After the crash, McLean moved the Bruins to New Westminster, where he coached them for 14 seasons. However, the transition to New Westminster was met with apprehension from the WCHL board who were against expansion to the West.

A few years after the relocation, the newly named New Westminster Bruins won four consecutive President's Cup titles from 1975 to 1978 and two Memorial Cup titles in 1977 and 1978. After winning the 1977 Memorial Cup and another WHL Championship title, McLean was tapped to coach the Canada men's national junior ice hockey team at the 1978 World Junior Ice Hockey Championships. Future National Hockey League superstar Wayne Gretzky tried out for the team but McLean claimed he did not know if Gretzky was "strong enough at 16 years of age to play with these older guys". While McLean did not invite Gretzky to the initial junior tryout camp in 1977, he was eventually added to Canada's roster and led the tournament with eight goals and nine assists.

Throughout his coaching career, McLean earned a reputation for brawling with the opposition. In one instance, he was suspended 25 games for punching a referee as he skated past the Bruins bench. As a result of his tough guy reputation, and survival of life-threatening injuries, he earned the nickname "Punch". At the conclusion of his coaching career, McLean placed second all-time among WHL coaches in games coached with 1,067.

== Personal life and death ==
McLean was married to Frances.

In August 2009, McLean went missing for four days and five nights without food or supplies after getting lost while prospecting for gold.

McLean died when his vehicle went off the Stewart–Cassiar Highway near Dease Lake, British Columbia, on May 8, 2026. Police said he was the only person in the vehicle.

== Awards and honors ==
McLean received the WCHL Coach of the Year Award for the 1975–76 WCHL season. He was awarded the WHL's Governors Award in 2005, and was inducted into the BC Hockey Hall of Fame in 2006.

In April 2016, the Ernie "Punch" McLean tournament was created at Langley Events Centre where six teams competed.
