= Brad Maxwell =

Canadian ice hockey player (1957–2023)

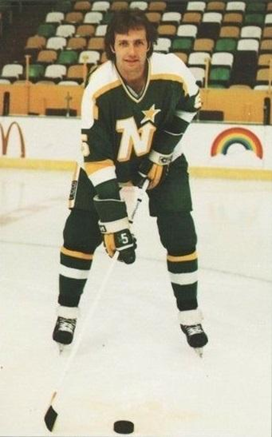
- Maxwell for a 1981 photo
- Born: July 8, 1957 Brandon, Manitoba, Canada
- Died: September 3, 2023 (aged 66) Minneapolis, Minnesota, U.S.
- Height: 6 ft 2 in (188 cm)
- Weight: 195 lb (88 kg; 13 st 13 lb)
- Position: Defence
- Shot: Right
- Played for: Minnesota North Stars; Quebec Nordiques; Toronto Maple Leafs; Vancouver Canucks; New York Rangers
- National team: Canada
- NHL draft: 7th overall, 1977; Minnesota North Stars
- WHA draft: 12th overall, 1977; Birmingham Bulls
- Playing career: 1977–1987
Medal record
Representing Canada
Ice hockey
World Championships
Bronze medal – third place	1978 Prague
Bronze medal – third place	1982 Finland

Bradley Robert Maxwell (July 8, 1957 – September 3, 2023) was a Canadian professional ice hockey player renowned as a playmaking defenceman. He featured in the 1981 Stanley Cup Finals with the Minnesota North Stars.

== Pro career ==
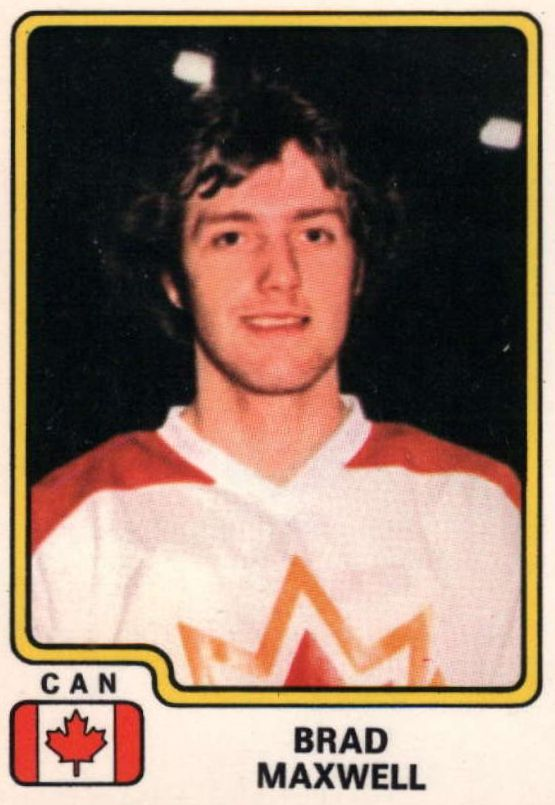
Maxwell on a 1979 sports card

After having won the Memorial Cup in 1977 as a member of the New Westminster Bruins, Maxwell was selected seventh overall in the 1977 NHL amateur draft by the Minnesota North Stars. He stayed with the North Stars throughout the early 1980s, recording 73 points in 78 games in his best season with the club in 1983–84. At the end of his career he bounced around between teams, spending short amounts of time with the Quebec Nordiques, Toronto Maple Leafs, Vancouver Canucks and New York Rangers, and ultimately retired in 1987.

Maxwell claimed that his last trade, from the Rangers back to the North Stars, happened because Rangers general manager Phil Esposito lost a card game to North Stars general manager Lou Nanne.

== Post-playing career ==
Following his retirement from professional hockey, Maxwell launched Brad Maxwell Cabinets & Construction in Minnesota. Maxwell also organized and played with members of the North Stars alumni for charity games, including coordinating the North Stars alumni group for the 2016 NHL Stadium Series, which included a game in which Chicago Blackhawks alumni played against a team comprising alumni from both the North Stars and the Minnesota Wild.

Maxwell died of lung cancer on September 3, 2023, at the age of 66.

== Career statistics ==
=== Regular season and playoffs ===
			Regular season					Playoffs
Season	Team	League	GP	G	A	Pts	PIM	GP	G	A	Pts	PIM
1973–74	Bellingham Blazers	BCJHL	61	20	37	57	132	—	—	—	—	—
1974–75	New Westminster Bruins	WCHL	69	13	47	60	124	18	7	13	20	33
1975–76	New Westminster Bruins	WCHL	72	19	80	99	239	17	3	12	15	86
1976–77	New Westminster Bruins	WCHL	70	21	58	79	205	14	7	15	22	39
1977–78	Minnesota North Stars	NHL	75	18	29	47	100	—	—	—	—	—
1978–79	Minnesota North Stars	NHL	70	9	28	37	145	—	—	—	—	—
1978–79	Oklahoma City Stars	CHL	2	0	1	1	21	—	—	—	—	—
1979–80	Minnesota North Stars	NHL	58	7	30	37	126	11	0	8	8	20
1980–81	Minnesota North Stars	NHL	27	3	13	16	98	18	3	11	14	35
1981–82	Minnesota North Stars	NHL	51	10	21	31	96	4	0	3	3	13
1982–83	Minnesota North Stars	NHL	77	11	28	39	157	9	5	6	11	23
1983–84	Minnesota North Stars	NHL	78	19	54	73	225	16	2	11	13	40
1984–85	Minnesota North Stars	NHL	18	3	7	10	53	—	—	—	—	—
1984–85	Quebec Nordiques	NHL	50	7	24	31	119	18	2	9	11	35
1985–86	Toronto Maple Leafs	NHL	52	8	18	26	108	3	0	1	1	12
1986–87	Vancouver Canucks	NHL	30	1	7	8	28	—	—	—	—	—
1986–87	New York Rangers	NHL	9	0	4	4	6	—	—	—	—	—
1986–87	Minnesota North Stars	NHL	17	2	7	9	31	—	—	—	—	—
NHL totals			612	98	270	368	1292	79	12	49	61	178

=== International ===
Year	Team	Event	GP	G	A	Pts	PIM
1978	Canada	WC	10	2	1	3	12
1979	Canada	WC	4	1	0	1	8
1982	Canada	WC	7	0	0	0	10
Senior totals			21	3	1	4	30

== Awards ==
- WCHL Second All-Star Team – 1976, 1977

Preceded by Glen Sharpley	Minnesota North Stars first-round draft pick 1977	Succeeded by Bobby Smith
