= 1976 Memorial Cup =

Canadian junior men's ice hockey championship

Tournament details
- Venue(s): Montreal Forum (Montreal, Quebec)
- Dates: May 9–16, 1976
- Teams: 3

Final positions
- Champions: Hamilton Fincups (OMJHL) (2nd title)

The Memorial Cup trophy

The 1976 Memorial Cup occurred from May 9 to 16 at the Montreal Forum in Montreal, Quebec. It was the 58th annual Memorial Cup competition and determined the major junior ice hockey champion of the Canadian Hockey League (CHL). Participating teams were the winners of the Ontario Major Junior Hockey League, Quebec Major Junior Hockey League and Western Hockey League which were the Hamilton Fincups, Quebec Remparts and New Westminster Bruins. Hamilton won their second Memorial Cup, and first since changing their name to Fincups, defeating New Westminster in the final game.

== Teams ==
QMJHL Team OMJHL Team WCHL Team Host City

=== Hamilton Fincups ===
The Hamilton Fincups represented the Ontario Major Junior Hockey League at the 1976 Memorial Cup. The Fincups finished the 1975-76 season as the top team in the West Division, as they had a record of 43-15-8, earning 94 points. The Fincups had a high-scoring offense, scoring 378 goals, which ranked second in the league. Hamilton's 232 goals against ranked as the second fewest in the OMJHL. In the West Division semi-finals, the Fincups swept the Kitchener Rangers in four games. In the West Division finals, Hamilton defeated the defending OMJHL champions, the Toronto Marlboros four games to zero, as well as the teams playing to a tie. The Fincups faced the top team in the league, the Sudbury Wolves, in the final round. Hamilton defeated the Wolves four games to two to capture the J. Ross Robertson Cup and a berth into the 1976 Memorial Cup.

The Fincups offense was led by Dale McCourt, who became a top prospect for the 1977 NHL entry draft during this season. McCourt scored 55 goals and 139 points in 66 games to lead the Fincups in scoring, and finished in fourth place in the league scoring race. McCourt followed up by scoring 20 goals and 28 points in 14 post-season games. McCourt was awarded the William Hanley Trophy, given to the Most Sportsmanlike Player in the league. Overager Ted Long scored 27 goals and 91 points in 62 games, while Ric Seiling was another emerging top prospect for the 1977 NHL entry draft, scoring 35 goals and 86 points in 59 games. Joe Contini scored 28 goals and 80 points in 54 games, and then led the Fincups in post-season scoring with nine goals and 29 points in 14 games. Goaltender Mark Locken was the Fincups starter, as he earned a 3.14 GAA in 44 games during the regular season. Locken was awarded the F.W. "Dinty" Moore Trophy for having the lowest goals against average by a first year goaltender in the OMJHL.

The 1976 Memorial Cup was the first since the franchise was renamed the Fincups in 1974. The Hamilton Red Wings won the 1962 Memorial Cup when they defeated the Edmonton Oil Kings in their only Memorial Cup appearance.

=== New Westminster Bruins ===
The New Westminster Bruins coached by Punch McLean, represented the Western Canada Hockey League at the 1976 Memorial Cup. This was the Bruins second consecutive appearance at the tournament. New Westminster was the best regular season team in the WCHL during the 1975-76 season, earning a record of 54-14-4, registering 112 points. The Bruins were the highest scoring team in the league, recording 463 goals, while they allowed the fewest goals in the WCHL, allowing 247 goals. In the WCHL quarter-finals, the Bruins swept the Brandon Wheat Kings five games to zero. In the WCHL semi-finals, the Bruins remained undefeated, as they beat the Victoria Cougars with four wins and a tie in their five game series. New Westminster defeated the Saskatoon Blades four games to two, with a tie, to capture the President's Cup for the second straight season, earning a berth in the 1976 Memorial Cup.

Fred Berry led the Bruins in scoring, as he scored 59 goals and 146 points in 72 games. He ranked fifth in overall league scoring. Rick Shinske ranked fifth in league scoring, as he had 52 goals and 143 points in 70 games. Shinske led the club in post-season scoring with seven goals and 30 points in 17 games. Steve Clippingdale scored 51 goals and 117 points in 72 games to rank third in team scoring. In the post-season, Clippingdale scored a team high 15 goals and had 29 points in 17 games. Mark Lofthouse scored a team high 68 goals during the regular season, while adding 48 assists for 116 points in 72 games. On defence, Barry Beck emerged as a force, as he scored 19 goals and 99 points in 68 games, while accumulating 325 penalty minutes. Beck was recognized as one of the top prospects for the 1977 NHL entry draft. Fellow defenceman Brad Maxwell also scored 19 goals and 99 points in 72 games played as he also emerged as a top pick for the 1977 NHL entry draft. Clayton Pachal scored 41 goals and 98 points in 65 games, as the Bruins had seven players with 98 or more points during the season. In goal, Carey Walker had the majority of playing time, earning a record of 28-6-2 with a 3.21 GAA and .900 save percentage in 38 games. Walker was named as the Top Goaltender in the league. Bruins head coach Punch McLean was named Coach of the Year.

The 1976 Memorial Cup was the second berth in Bruins franchise history. New Westminster lost to the Toronto Marlboros 7-3 in the final game of the 1975 Memorial Cup.

=== Quebec Remparts ===
The Quebec Remparts represented the Quebec Major Junior Hockey League at the 1976 Memorial Cup. The Remparts had the best record in the East Division during the 1975-76 with a record of 39-25-8, earning 86 points. Quebec scored 336 goals, ranking them fifth in the ten team league, while the Remparts allowed the third fewest goals against at 288. In the QMJHL quarter-finals, the Remparts defeated the Sorel Éperviers four games to one. In the QMJHL semi-finals, Quebec swept the Cornwall Royals in four games, advancing to the President's Cup. In the final round, the Remparts defeated the defending champions, the Sherbrooke Castors four games to two to clinch the championship and a berth into the 1976 Memorial Cup.

The Remparts leading scorer was Denis Turcotte, who scored 54 goals and 113 points in 72 games. Turcotte also led the Remparts in post-season scoring with nine goals and 26 points in 15 games. Eddy Godin scored 38 goals and 100 points in 72 games as the club had two players with at least 100 points. Defenseman Jean Gagnon scored 21 goals and 73 points in 66 games to rank third in team scoring. Gagnon was awarded the Emile Bouchard Trophy, awarded to the Top Defenseman in the league. In goal, Maurice Barrette appeared in 58 games, earning a record of 34-19-4 with a 3.81 GAA and a .870 save percentage.

The 1976 Memorial Cup was the Remparts fourth appearance in club history. Quebec won the 1971 Memorial Cup when they defeated the Edmonton Oil Kings. The club then lost in the final game at the 1973 Memorial Cup to the Toronto Marlboros, and then once again lost in the final game at the 1974 Memorial Cup against the Regina Pats.

== Round-robin standings ==
Pos	Team	Pld	W	L	GF	GA	
1	Hamilton Fincups (OMJHL)	2	1	1	11	8	Advanced to final
2	New Westminster Bruins (WHL)	2	1	1	8	10	Advanced to final
3	Quebec Remparts (QMJHL)	2	1	1	6	7	

== Scores ==
Round-robin

- May 9 Quebec 4–3 Hamilton
- May 10 New Westminster 4–2 Quebec
- May 12 Hamilton 8–4 New Westminster

Semi-Final

- May 14 New Westminster 10–3 Quebec

Final

- May 16 Hamilton 5–2 New Westminster

== Winning roster ==
Joe Contini, Mike Fedorko, Steve Hazlett, Cal Herd, Denis Houle, Willie Huber, Al Jensen, Mike Keating, Archie King, Joe Kowal, Mark Locken, Ted Long, Dale McCourt, Bob Mierkalns, Mark Perras, Bill Reilly, Ron Roscoe, Al Secord, Ric Seiling, Danny Shearer, Ed Smith, Rob Street, Sean Sullivan. Coach: Bert Templeton

== Award winners ==
- Stafford Smythe Memorial Trophy (MVP): Dale McCourt, Hamilton
- George Parsons Trophy (Sportsmanship): Richard Shinske, New Westminster
- Hap Emms Memorial Trophy (Goaltender): Maurice Barrette, Quebec

All-star team

- Goal: Maurice Barrette, Quebec
- Defence: Jean Gagnon, Quebec; Barry Beck, New Westminster
- Centre: Dale McCourt, Hamilton
- Left wing: Ric Seiling, Hamilton
- Right wing: Harold Phillipoff, New Westminster
