= New Westminster Bruins =

Ice hockey team

- City: New Westminster, British Columbia
- League: Western Hockey League
- Operated: 1971–81 and 1983–88
- Home arena: Queen's Park Arena
- Colours: Black, white & gold

Franchise history
- 1966–67: Calgary Buffaloes
- 1967–77: Calgary Centennials
- 1977–82: Billings Bighorns
- 1982–83: Nanaimo Islanders
- 1983–88: New Westminster Bruins
- 1988–present: Tri-City Americans

Previous franchise history
- 1966–71: Estevan Bruins
- 1971–81: New Westminster Bruins
- 1981–84: Kamloops Junior Oilers
- 1984–present: Kamloops Blazers

Championships
- League champions: 4 (1974–75, 1975–76, 1976–77, 1977–78)
- Division titles: 2 (1975–76, 1976–77)
- Memorial Cups: 2 (1977, 1978)

The New Westminster Bruins were a major junior ice hockey team in the Western Hockey League. There were two franchises that carried this name:

- 1971–1981 (formerly the Estevan Bruins, now the Kamloops Blazers)
- 1983–1988 (formerly the Nanaimo Islanders, now the Tri-City Americans)

Both incarnations of the franchise played at Queen's Park Arena in the Vancouver suburb of New Westminster, British Columbia.

== History ==
=== First Bruins ===
The franchise began in 1946 as the Humboldt Indians of the original version of the Saskatchewan Junior Hockey League (1948–1966), moving to Estevan to become the Bruins in 1957. They were a founding member of the Western Canada-based Canadian Major Junior Hockey League (later renamed the Western Canada Hockey League) in 1966. The Estevan Bruins had been a successful franchise, including a loss in the 1968 Memorial Cup national championship, when team owner and coach Punch McLean moved the team to New Westminster for the 1971–72 WCHL season.

New Westminster Bruins logo used by the second incarnation of the franchise.

Once the team arrived in New Westminster, the success continued throughout much of the decade. The Bruins won the President's Cup four times in a row between 1975 and 1978. They made it to the Memorial Cup finals four years in a row as well, losing in 1975 and 1976 before winning it in 1977 and 1978. The WCHL was renamed the Western Hockey League for the 1978–79 WHL season. That season, after a brawl at the end of a game against Portland in March 1979 at Queens Park Arena, some local hockey fans started to look with disfavour upon the Bruins' rough tactics, and the team's popularity began to wane. The Bruins moved to Kamloops, British Columbia, for the 1981–82 WHL season, where they would become first the Kamloops Junior Oilers and, from the 1984–85 WHL season, the Kamloops Blazers.

=== Second Bruins ===
The second incarnation of the Bruins arrived in New Westminster in 1983 from Nanaimo, British Columbia, where they had previously been known as the Nanaimo Islanders. The team originated in Calgary in 1966–67 with a stop as the Billings Bighorns. The team only played one season in Nanaimo before moving. The new Bruins did not enjoy the same level of success, and lasted only five seasons in New Westminster before moving to Kennewick, Washington, to become the Tri-City Americans. This franchise has never won the WHL championship in any of its incarnations.

== Season-by-season records ==
=== First Bruins (1971–81) ===
Note: GP = games played, W = wins, L = losses, T = ties Pts = points, GF = goals for, GA = goals against

Season	GP	W	L	T	GF	GA	Points	Finish	Playoffs
1971–72	68	40	27	1	285	240	81	3rd West	Lost quarter-final
1972–73	68	31	22	15	283	264	77	4th West	Lost quarter-final
1973–74	68	36	21	11	284	250	83	2nd West	Lost semi-final
1974–75	70	37	22	11	319	260	85	3rd West	Won championship, 2nd in Memorial Cup
1975–76	72	54	14	4	463	247	112	1st West	Won championship, 2nd in Memorial Cup
1976–77	72	47	14	11	363	216	105	1st West	Won championship and Memorial Cup
1977–78	72	33	28	11	345	310	77	3rd West	Won championship and Memorial Cup
1978–79	72	34	32	6	310	301	74	3rd West	Eliminated in round robin
1979–80	72	10	61	1	244	443	21	4th West	Out of playoffs
1980–81	72	17	54	1	306	512	35	5th West	Out of playoffs

=== Second Bruins (1983–88) ===
Season	GP	W	L	T	GF	GA	Points	Finish	Playoffs
1983–84	72	34	36	2	304	348	70	2nd West	Lost West Division semi-final
1984–85	72	41	29	2	379	302	84	2nd West	Lost West Division final
1985–86	72	25	45	2	276	373	52	5th West	Out of playoffs
1986–87	72	18	50	4	300	432	40	6th West	Out of playoffs
1987–88	72	33	34	5	339	358	71	4th West	Lost West Division semi-final

== NHL alumni ==
Totals include both incarnations of the Bruins

- Mike Allison
- Glenn Anderson
- Stu Barnes
- Barry Beck
- Fred Berry
- Ken Berry
- Craig Berube
- Jim Camazzola
- Al Cameron
- Steve Clippingdale
- Ed Cooper
- Scott Daniels
- Larry DePalma
- Jim Dobson
- Todd Ewen
- Link Gaetz
- Ron Greschner
- Glen Hanlon
- Lorne Henning
- Bob Hess
- Brent Hughes
- John-Paul Kelly
- Darin Kimble
- Dean Kolstad
- Olaf Kolzig
- Doug Kostynski
- Kevin Krook
- Gord Lane
- Derek Laxdal
- Gord Laxton
- Jamie Leach
- Mark Lofthouse
- Larry Lozinski
- Bernie Lukowich
- Mike MacWilliam
- Stewart Malgunas
- Don Martineau
- Brad Maxwell
- Alan May
- Larry Melnyk
- Vic Mercredi
- Jay More
- Glenn Mulvenna
- Brian Noonan
- John Ogrodnick
- Dave Orleski
- Clayton Pachal
- Harold Phillipoff
- Bill Ranford
- Mark Recchi
- Pokey Reddick
- Terry Richardson
- Cliff Ronning
- Kevin Schamehorn
- Rick Shinske
- Reid Simpson
- Barry Smith
- Vern Smith
- Stan Smyl
- Ed Staniowski
- Daryl Stanley
- Bob Stumpf
- Brian Young
- Miles Zaharko
- Mike Zanier

== See also ==
- List of ice hockey teams in British Columbia
