= 1978 World Junior Ice Hockey Championships =

1978 IIHF World Junior Championship
Tournament details
- Host country: Canada
- Venues: 5 (in 5 host cities)
- Dates: December 22, 1977 – January 3, 1978
- Teams: 8

Final positions
- Champions: Soviet Union (2nd title)
- Runners-up: Sweden
- Third place: Canada
- Fourth place: Czechoslovakia

Tournament statistics
- Games played: 25
- Goals scored: 248 (9.92 per game)
- Attendance: 41,681 (1,667 per game)
- Scoring leader: (Canada) Wayne Gretzky (17 points)

The 1978 World Junior Ice Hockey Championships (1978 WJHC) was the second edition of the Ice Hockey World Junior Championship and was held from December 22, 1977, until January 3, 1978. The tournament was held in Canada, mainly in Montreal and Quebec City. The Soviet Union won its second consecutive gold medal, while Sweden won the silver, and Canada the bronze.

== Final standings ==
The 1978 tournament divided participants into two divisions of four teams, each playing three games. The top two teams in each division advanced to the medal round (Group A), while the bottom two were placed in Group B. Each division played another round robin. The top two teams in the medal round played a one-game final for the gold medal.

This is the aggregate standings, ordered according to final placing. The four teams in the medal round (Group A) were ranked one through four, while the four teams in Group B were ranked five through eight regardless of overall record.

Pos	Team	Pld	W	L	D	GF	GA	GD	Pts
1	Soviet Union	7	6	1	0	50	16	+34	12
2	Sweden	7	3	2	2	27	24	+3	8
3	Canada	6	4	2	0	36	18	+18	8
4	Czechoslovakia	6	2	3	1	21	31	−10	5
5	United States	6	4	2	0	41	30	+11	8
6	Finland	6	3	2	1	45	25	+20	7
7	West Germany	6	1	5	0	20	33	−13	2
8	Switzerland	6	0	6	0	7	70	−63	0

Source: Hockey Canada

Switzerland was relegated to Pool B for the 1979 World Junior Ice Hockey Championships.

== Preliminary round ==
=== Gold group ===
Team	Pld	W	L	D	GF	GA	GD	Pts
Sweden	3	2	0	1	18	8	+10	5
Soviet Union	3	2	1	0	31	11	+20	4
Finland	3	1	1	1	26	15	+11	3
Switzerland	3	0	3	0	3	44	−41	0

Source: Hockey Canada

December 22, 1977	Soviet Union	18 – 1 (4–0, 5–0, 9–1)	Switzerland	Cornwall, Ontario

December 22, 1977	Sweden	4 – 4 (1–2, 1–1, 2–1)	Finland	Chicoutimi, Quebec

December 23, 1977	Sweden	6 – 3 (2–0, 3–1, 1–2)	Soviet Union	Quebec City, Quebec

December 23, 1977	Switzerland	1 – 18 (0–4, 1–7, 0–7)	Finland	Chicoutimi, Quebec

December 26, 1977	Sweden	8 – 1 (3–0, 3–0, 2–1)	Switzerland	Cornwall, Ontario

December 26, 1977	Soviet Union	10 – 4 (3–1, 3–2, 4–1)	Finland	Montreal, Quebec

=== Blue group ===
Team	Pld	W	L	D	GF	GA	GD	Pts
Canada	3	3	0	0	23	6	+17	6
Czechoslovakia	3	2	1	0	16	18	−2	4
United States	3	1	2	0	16	18	−2	2
West Germany	3	0	3	0	8	21	−13	0

Source: Hockey Canada

December 22, 1977	Canada	6 – 3 (2–1, 1–2, 3–0)	United States	Montreal, Quebec

December 22, 1977	Czechoslovakia	5 – 4 (2–0, 2–3, 1–1)	West Germany	Quebec City, Quebec

December 23, 1977	Canada	8 – 0 (4–0, 4–0, 0–0)	West Germany	Cornwall, Ontario

December 23, 1977	United States	5 – 8 (1–1, 1–7, 3–0)	Czechoslovakia	Hull, Quebec

December 25, 1977	Canada	9 – 3 (4–2, 2–1, 3–0)	Czechoslovakia	Montreal, Quebec

December 25, 1977	West Germany	4 – 8 (1–1, 1–4, 2–3)	United States	Hull, Quebec

== Championship round ==
=== Group B ===
Team	Pld	W	L	D	GF	GA	GD	Pts
United States	3	3	0	0	25	12	+13	6
Finland	3	2	1	0	19	10	+9	4
West Germany	3	1	2	0	12	12	0	2
Switzerland	3	0	3	0	4	26	−22	0

Source: Hockey Canada

December 28, 1977	Finland	4 – 1	West Germany	Chicoutimi, Quebec

December 28, 1977	United States	11 – 1	Switzerland	Cornwall, Ontario

December 31, 1977	Finland	9 – 1	Switzerland	Cornwall, Ontario

December 31, 1977	United States	6 – 5	West Germany	Hull, Quebec

January 1, 1978	Finland	6 – 8	United States	Hull, Quebec

January 1, 1978	West Germany	6 – 2	Switzerland	Cornwall, Ontario

=== Group A ===
Team	Pld	W	L	D	GF	GA	GD	Pts
Soviet Union	3	3	0	0	14	3	+11	6
Sweden	3	1	1	1	7	11	−4	3
Canada	3	1	2	0	13	12	+1	2
Czechoslovakia	3	0	2	1	5	13	−8	1

Source: Hockey Canada

December 28, 1977	Canada	2 – 3 (2–0, 0–2, 0–1)	Soviet Union	Quebec City, Quebec

December 28, 1977	Sweden	1 – 1 (0-1, 0-0, 1-0)	Czechoslovakia	Montreal, Quebec

December 31, 1977	Canada	6 – 3 (1–1, 1–1, 4–1)	Czechoslovakia	Montreal, Quebec

December 31, 1977	Soviet Union	5 – 0 (1–0, 1–0, 3–0)	Sweden	Quebec City, Quebec

January 1, 1978	Canada	5 – 6 (2–2, 0–2, 3–2)	Sweden	Montreal, Quebec

January 1, 1978	Czechoslovakia	1 – 6 (1–2, 0–0, 0–4)	Soviet Union	Quebec City, Quebec

=== Gold medal game ===
January 3, 1978	(gold) Soviet Union	5 – 2 (2–1, 2–1, 1–0)	Sweden (silver)	Montreal, Quebec

== Scoring leaders ==
Rank	Player	Country	G	A	Pts
1	Wayne Gretzky	Canada	8	9	17
2	Viktor Shkurdyuk	Soviet Union	10	6	16
3	Sergei Makarov	Soviet Union	8	7	15
4	Bobby Crawford	United States	4	9	13
5	Jorma Sevon	Finland	7	5	12
5	Mark Green	United States	7	5	12
7	Timo Susi	Finland	7	3	10
7	Rainer Risku	Finland	7	3	10
7	Gerd Truntschka	West Germany	7	3	10
10	Wayne Babych	Canada	5	5	10

== Tournament awards ==
	IIHF Directorate Awards	Media All-Star Team
Goaltender	(Soviet Union) Alexander Tyzhnykh	(Soviet Union) Alexander Tyzhnykh
Defencemen	(Soviet Union) Viacheslav Fetisov	(Soviet Union) Viacheslav Fetisov (Finland) Risto Siltanen
Forwards	(Canada) Wayne Gretzky	(Czechoslovakia) Anton Šťastný (Canada) Wayne Gretzky (Sweden) Mats Näslund
