= 1976–77 WCHL season =

Junior ice hockey season

- League: Western Hockey League
- Sport: Ice hockey
- Teams: 12

Regular season
- Season champions: Brandon Wheat Kings (1)
- Season MVP: Barry Beck (New Westminster Bruins)
- Top scorer: Bill Derlago (Brandon Wheat Kings)

Playoffs
- Finals champions: New Westminster Bruins (3)
- Runners-up: Brandon Wheat Kings

WHL seasons
- 1975–76 1977–78

1976–77 CHL season
- League: Canadian Hockey League
- Sport: Ice hockey
- Teams: 34

OMJHL

QMJHL

WCHL

Memorial Cup
- Finals champions: New Westminster Bruins (WCHL) (1st title)
- Runners-up: Ottawa 67's (OMJHL)

The 1976–77 WCHL season was the 11th season of the Western Canada Hockey League. It featured twelve teams and a 72-game regular season. The Brandon Wheat Kings won their first regular season title, posting 54 wins on the season. However, in the playoffs the New Westminster Bruins continued their run of dominance and won their third consecutive President's Cup, defeating the Wheat Kings in the championship series. The Bruins advanced to the 1977 Memorial Cup tournament, and there they secured their first Memorial Cup title.

The season was the first for the Portland Winter Hawks, who became the league's first American-based club when the charter Edmonton Oil Kings relocated to Portland, Oregon prior to the season. The Winnipeg Clubs also changed their name to the Monarchs.

== League notes ==
- The league adopted a new divisional format, dividing into three divisions of four teams each.

== Team changes ==
- The Edmonton Oil Kings relocated to Portland, Oregon, becoming the Portland Winterhawks.
- The Winnipeg Clubs are renamed the Winnipeg Monarchs.

== Regular season ==
=== Final standings ===
East Division
Pos	Team	Pld	W	L	T	GF	GA	Pts
1	x – Saskatoon Blades	72	43	19	10	390	269	96
2	x – Brandon Wheat Kings	72	34	30	8	341	303	76
3	x – Lethbridge Broncos	72	28	35	9	293	352	65
4	x – Winnipeg Clubs	72	27	39	6	302	378	60
5	x – Regina Pats	72	22	42	8	278	347	52
6	Flin Flon Bombers	72	18	44	10	279	441	46

x – qualified for playoffs

West Division
Pos	Team	Pld	W	L	T	GF	GA	Pts
1	x – New Westminster Bruins	72	54	14	4	463	247	112
2	x – Kamloops Chiefs	72	40	26	6	365	285	86
3	x – Medicine Hat Tigers	72	38	24	10	379	306	86
4	x – Victoria Cougars	72	37	28	7	343	320	81
5	x – Edmonton Oil Kings	72	25	42	5	312	400	55
6	Calgary Centennials	72	22	45	5	284	381	49

x – qualified for playoffs

=== Scoring leaders ===
Note: GP = Games played; G = Goals; A = Assists; Pts = Points; PIM = Penalties in minutes

Player	Team	GP	G	A	Pts	PIM
Bernie Federko	Saskatoon Blades	72	72	115	187	108
Greg Carroll	Medicine Hat Tigers	71	60	109	169	118
Don Murdoch	Medicine Hat Tigers	70	88	77	165	202
Blair Chapman	Saskatoon Blades	69	71	86	157	67
Fred Berry	New Westminster Bruins	72	59	87	146	164
Rick Shinske	New Westminster Bruins	70	52	91	143	86
Jim Gustafson	Victoria Cougars	69	46	95	141	72
Morris Lukowich	Medicine Hat Tigers	72	65	75	140	195
Rich Gosselin	Flin Flon Bombers	69	67	66	133	192
Dale McMullin	Brandon Wheat Kings	72	56	74	130	28

== Regular season ==
=== Final standings ===
East Division	GP	W	L	T	Pts	GF	GA
x Brandon Wheat Kings	72	54	10	8	116	447	242
x Saskatoon Blades	72	30	30	12	72	317	290
Flin Flon Bombers	72	16	42	14	46	294	411
Regina Pats	72	8	53	11	27	218	464

Central Division	GP	W	L	T	Pts	GF	GA
x Medicine Hat Tigers	72	32	28	12	76	330	304
x Winnipeg Monarchs	72	31	34	7	69	341	384
x Lethbridge Broncos	72	28	32	12	68	324	335
x Calgary Centennials	72	22	34	15	59	329	397

West Division	GP	W	L	T	Pts	GF	GA
x New Westminster Bruins	72	47	14	11	105	363	216
x Kamloops Chiefs	72	34	26	12	80	308	291
x Portland Winter Hawks	72	36	29	7	79	359	294
x Victoria Cougars	72	27	32	13	67	299	301

=== Scoring leaders ===
Note: GP = Games played; G = Goals; A = Assists; Pts = Points; PIM = Penalties in minutes

Player	Team	GP	G	A	Pts	PIM
Bill Derlago	Brandon Wheat Kings	72	96	82	178	63
Ray Allison	Brandon Wheat Kings	71	45	92	137	198
Brian Propp	Brandon Wheat Kings	72	55	80	135	47
Kevin McCarthy	Winnipeg Monarchs	72	22	105	127	110
Dan Bonar	Brandon Wheat Kings	72	75	50	125	70
Tony Currie	Portland Winter Hawks	72	73	52	125	50
Mark Lofthouse	New Westminster Bruins	70	54	58	112	59
Wayne Babych	Portland Winter Hawks	72	50	62	112	76
Brent Peterson	Portland Winter Hawks	69	34	78	112	98
Kim Davis	Flin Flon Bombers	69	56	55	111	250

== 1977 WCHL Playoffs ==
=== Preliminary round ===
- Calgary defeated Medicine Hat 4 games to 0
- Lethbridge defeated Saskatoon 4 games to 2

=== League quarter-finals ===
- Brandon defeated Winnipeg 5 games to 2
- Lethbridge defeated Calgary 3 games to 2
- New Westminster defeated Victoria 4 games to 0
- Portland defeated Kamloops 4 games to 1

=== League semi-finals ===
- Brandon defeated Lethbridge 4 games to 0
- New Westminster defeated Portland 4 games to 1

=== WHL Championship ===
- New Westminster defeated Brandon 4 games to 1

== All-Star game ==
On January 19, the West All-Stars defeated the East All-Stars 3–2 at Brandon, Manitoba before a crowd of 4,120.

== WHL awards ==
Most Valuable Player: Barry Beck, New Westminster Bruins
Top Scorer: Bill Derlago, Brandon Wheat Kings
Most Sportsmanlike Player: Steve Tambellini, Lethbridge Broncos
Top Defenseman: Barry Beck, New Westminster Bruins
Rookie of the Year: Brian Propp, Brandon Wheat Kings
Top Goaltender: Glen Hanlon, Brandon Wheat Kings
Coach of the Year: Dunc McCallum, Brandon Wheat Kings
Regular season champions: Brandon Wheat Kings

== All-Star teams ==
	First Team		Second Team	
Goal	Glen Hanlon	Brandon Wheat Kings	Dave Parro	Saskatoon Blades
Defense	Barry Beck	New Westminster Bruins	Brad Maxwell	New Westminster Bruins
Defense	Kevin McCarthy	Winnipeg Monarchs	Brad McCrimmon	Brandon Wheat Kings
Center	Bill Derlago	Brandon Wheat Kings	Ron Areshenkoff	Medicine Hat Tigers
Left Wing	Reg Kerr	Kamloops Chiefs	Brian Propp	Brandon Wheat Kings
Right Wing	Wayne Babych	Portland Winter Hawks	Mark Lofthouse	New Westminster Bruins

== See also ==
- 1977 NHL entry draft
- 1976 in sports
- 1977 in sports

Preceded by 1975–76 WCHL season	WHL seasons	Succeeded by 1977–78 WCHL season
