= Terry Sawchuk Trophy =

The Terry Sawchuk Trophy was an annual award presented by the Central Hockey League to recognize the top goaltenders on the league's best defensive team. The trophy was given to the goaltender(s) of the team allowing the fewest goals during the regular season.

Established for the 1976–77 season, the award was named to honor the late Terry Sawchuk.

== Winners ==
Year	Player	Team
1976–77
1976–77	Yves Belanger	Kansas City Blues
1976–77	Gord McRae	Dallas Black Hawks
1977–78	Doug Grant; Ed Staniowski	Salt Lake Golden Eagles
1978–79	Doug Grant; Terry Richardson	Salt Lake Golden Eagles
1979–80	Jim Park; Richard Brodeur	Indianapolis Checkers
1980–81	Paul Harrison; Ken Ellacott	Dallas Black Hawks
1981–82	Kelly Hrudey; Robert Holland	Indianapolis Checkers
1982–83	Kelly Hrudey; Robert Holland	Indianapolis Checkers
1983–84		
