= Yves Bélanger (ice hockey) =

Canadian ice hockey player (born 1952)

- Born: September 30, 1952 (age 73) Baie-Comeau, Quebec, Canada
- Height: 5 ft 11 in (180 cm)
- Weight: 170 lb (77 kg; 12 st 2 lb)
- Position: Goaltender
- Caught: Left
- Played for: St. Louis Blues; Atlanta Flames; Boston Bruins
- NHL draft: Undrafted
- Playing career: 1972–1980

Yves Bélanger (born September 30, 1952) is a Canadian former professional ice hockey goaltender.

== Early life ==
Belanger was born in Baie-Comeau. He played junior hockey in the Quebec Major Junior Hockey League for the Sherbrooke Castors.

== Career ==
Bélanger was not drafted into the National Hockey League (NHL), but signed with the Cleveland Crusaders of the World Hockey Association. He made his NHL debut during the 1974–75 season with the St. Louis Blues. He was traded along with Bob MacMillan, Dick Redmond and a second‐round selection in the 1979 NHL entry draft (23rd overall–Mike Perovich) from the St. Louis Blues to the Atlanta Flames for Phil Myre, Curt Bennett and Barry Gibbs on December 12, 1977. He played parts of two seasons with the Flames. He ended his NHL career with the Boston Bruins during the 1979-80 season.

== Career statistics ==
=== Regular season and playoffs ===
			Regular season									Playoffs
Season	Team	League	GP	W	L	T	MIN	GA	SO	GAA	SV%	GP	W	L	MIN	GA	SO	GAA	SV%
1969–70	Sherbrooke Castors	QMJHL	47	—	—	—	2780	225	0	4.86	.858	—	—	—	—	—	—	—	—
1970–71	Sherbrooke Castors	QMJHL	39	—	—	—	2340	182	0	4.67	.870	8	—	—	460	50	0	6.52	.850
1971–72	Sherbrooke Castors	QMJHL	38	—	—	—	2280	188	2	4.95	.870	1	—	—	39	4	0	6.15	.862
1972–73	Syracuse Blazers	EHL	38	—	—	—	2255	90	5	2.39	—	7	7	0	436	11	1	1.51	—
1973–74	Jacksonville Barons	AHL	54	17	27	4	2878	199	0	4.15	—	—	—	—	—	—	—	—	—
1974–75	St. Louis Blues	NHL	11	6	3	2	640	29	1	2.72	.901	—	—	—	—	—	—	—	—
1974–75	Denver Spurs	CHL	36	19	13	3	2060	105	0	3.06	—	—	—	—	—	—	—	—	—
1975–76	St. Louis Blues	NHL	31	11	17	1	1758	113	0	3.86	.884	—	—	—	—	—	—	—	—
1975–76	Providence Reds	AHL	10	3	4	3	620	37	0	3.58	—	2	0	2	120	8	0	4.00	—
1976–77	St. Louis Blues	NHL	3	2	0	0	140	7	0	3.00	.875	—	—	—	—	—	—	—	—
1976–77	Kansas City Blues	CHL	31	21	4	4	1826	83	1	2.73	.896	—	—	—	—	—	—	—	—
1977–78	St. Louis Blues	NHL	3	0	3	0	145	15	0	6.23	.821	—	—	—	—	—	—	—	—
1977–78	Atlanta Flames	NHL	17	7	8	0	936	55	1	3.53	.873	—	—	—	—	—	—	—	—
1977–78	Salt Lake Golden Eagles	CHL	9	5	3	0	492	20	1	2.44	.897	—	—	—	—	—	—	—	—
1978–79	Atlanta Flames	NHL	5	1	2	0	181	78	0	6.96	.731	—	—	—	—	—	—	—	—
1978–79	Philadelphia Firebirds	AHL	22	4	14	1	1235	108	0	5.25	.850	—	—	—	—	—	—	—	—
1979–80	Boston Bruins	NHL	8	2	0	3	328	19	0	3.48	.856	—	—	—	—	—	—	—	—
1979–80	Binghamton Dusters	AHL	25	7	13	1	1334	95	0	4.27	.859	—	—	—	—	—	—	—	—
1980–81	Charlottetown Islanders	NBSHL	—	—	—	—	—	—	—	—	—	—	—	—	—	—	—	—	—
1981–82	Cap Peele Caps	NBIHA	22	—	—	—	1296	69	1	3.19	—	—	—	—	—	—	—	—	—
1982–83	Cap Peele Caps	NBIHA	21	—	—	—	1226	81	0	3.96	—	7	3	4	420	19	0	2.72	—
1983–84	Charlottetown GJs	NBSHL	—	—	—	—	—	—	—	—	—	—	—	—	—	—	—	—	—
1986–87	Charlottetown Islanders	NBSHL	2	2	0	0	120	6	0	3.00	—	—	—	—	—	—	—	—	—
NHL totals			78	29	33	0	4127	259	2	3.77	.874	—	—	—	—	—	—	—	—

Preceded by Inaugural	Winner of the Terry Sawchuk Trophy shared with Gord McRae; 1976–77	Succeeded by Ed Staniowski and Doug Grant
