= Terry Richardson (ice hockey) =

Canadian ice hockey player (born 1953)

- Born: May 7, 1953 (age 73) Powell River, British Columbia, Canada
- Height: 6 ft 0 in (183 cm)
- Weight: 190 lb (86 kg; 13 st 8 lb)
- Position: Goaltender
- Caught: Right
- Played for: Detroit Red Wings; St. Louis Blues; London Lions
- NHL draft: 11th overall, 1973; Detroit Red Wings
- Playing career: 1973–1981

Terrance Paul Richardson (born May 7, 1953) is a Canadian former professional ice hockey goaltender. He played 20 games in the National Hockey League (NHL) with the Detroit Red Wings and St. Louis Blues between 1973 and 1979. The rest of his career, which lasted from 1973 to 1981, was spent in the minor leagues. Richardson was selected 11th overall by Detroit in the 1973 NHL Amateur Draft.

== Career ==
Richard began his career with the New Westminster Bruins during the 1971–72 season. He recorded three shutouts that year with a 3.06 goals against average (GAA). He had a record of 31–22–5 in 1972–73.

In 1973, Richardson was selected in the first round by the Red Wings. Richardson played in nine games that year finishing with one win and four losses and a dismal 5.33 goals against average. He was sent down to the Virginia Wings of the American Hockey League for conditioning and even was sent to the United Kingdom for a short time to play for the London Lions. The following year he returned to the Wings, but his skill did not. Richardson played only four games for the club and ended with a 6.83 GAA and one win before being sent back down to Virginia. The following season was no better, as the one NHL game that Richarson started ended in a loss with the score of 7–0 going to the Boston Bruins. He spent the rest of that year playing of both the Springfield Indians and the New Haven Nighthawks of the AHL.

The Red Wings decided to give Richardson one last shot with their club as he would start five games in the 1976–77 season, but again would disappoint, ending with one win and three losses. Richardson spent the rest of that year with the Kalamazoo Wings of the International Hockey League, leading them into the playoffs. However Kalamazoo would get knocked out in the second round. In 1977–78, Richardson played for the Kansas City Red Wings of the Central Hockey League, where he played a full season but finished with a 27–32–2 record.

On July 26, 1978, Richardson was signed as free agent by the St. Louis Blues, and found himself playing for their farm team, the Salt Lake Golden Eagles. Here he would have his best season to date, finishing with a 30–7–3 record in 40 games and leading the Eagles to the top of the CHL. He would even get called up for a single game with the Blues, but again watched as puck after puck got by in a 9–1 loss at the hands of the Minnesota North Stars.

In the summer of 1979, Richardson was involved in two trades. One from the Blues to the New York Islanders (along with Barry Gibbs) for future considerations on June 9 and from the Islanders to the Hartford Whalers for Ralph Klassen on June 14. He finished his career within the Whalers organization as he posted a 15–22–7 record in 46 games while playing again for the Springfield Indians in the 1979–80 season.

== Career statistics ==
=== Regular season and playoffs ===
			Regular season									Playoffs
Season	Team	League	GP	W	L	T	MIN	GA	SO	GAA	SV%	GP	W	L	MIN	GA	SO	GAA	SV%
1970–71	New Westminster Royals	BCHL	—	—	—	—	—	—	—	—	—	—	—	—	—	—	—	—	—
1971–72	New Westminster Bruins	WCHL	49	—	—	—	2737	140	3	3.07	—	5	1	4	300	19	0	3.80	—
1972–73	New Westminster Bruins	WCHL	68	31	22	15	3800	239	0	3.77	—	5	—	—	300	32	0	6.40	—
1973–74	Detroit Red Wings	NHL	9	1	4	0	315	28	0	5.35	.828	—	—	—	—	—	—	—	—
1973–74	Virginia Wings	AHL	14	5	7	2	744	44	0	3.54	—	—	—	—	—	—	—	—	—
1973–74	London Lions	Intl	14	—	—	—	710	37	0	3.12	—	—	—	—	—	—	—	—	—
1974–75	Detroit Red Wings	NHL	4	1	2	0	202	23	0	6.86	.758	—	—	—	—	—	—	—	—
1974–75	Virginia Wings	AHL	30	10	13	3	1612	96	1	3.57	—	2	0	2	119	7	0	3.52	—
1975–76	Detroit Red Wings	NHL	1	0	1	0	60	7	0	7.00	.806	—	—	—	—	—	—	—	—
1975–76	New Haven Nighthawks	AHL	4	1	2	1	243	14	0	3.46	—	2	0	2	126	6	0	2.86	—
1975–76	Springfield Indians	AHL	20	6	10	1	1080	77	0	4.28	—	—	—	—	—	—	—	—	—
1976–77	Detroit Red Wings	NHL	5	1	3	0	269	18	0	4.02	.869	—	—	—	—	—	—	—	—
1976–77	Kalamazoo Wings	IHL	65	—	—	—	3612	218	0	3.62	—	10	5	5	585	30	0	3.08	—
1977–78	Kansas City Red Wings	CHL	63	27	32	2	3766	199	1	3.17	—	—	—	—	—	—	—	—	—
1978–79	St. Louis Blues	NHL	1	0	1	0	60	9	0	9.00	.750	—	—	—	—	—	—	—	—
1978–79	Salt Lake Golden Eagles	CHL	40	30	7	3	2422	102	5	2.53	—	7	—	—	398	21	0	3.17	—
1979–80	Springfield Indians	AHL	46	15	22	7	2661	162	0	3.65	—	—	—	—	—	—	—	—	—
1980–81	Delta Hurry Kings	BCSHL	—	—	—	—	—	—	—	—	—	—	—	—	—	—	—	—	—
NHL totals			20	3	11	0	905	85	0	5.64	.818	—	—	—	—	—	—	—	—

== Awards ==
- Named to International Hockey League All-Star Second Team (1976–77)
- Won the James Norris Memorial Trophy (1976–77)
- Named to Central Hockey League All-Star Second Team (1977–78, 1978–79)
- Won the Terry Sawchuk Trophy (1978–79; shared with Doug Grant)

Preceded by Marcel Dionne	Detroit Red Wings first-round draft pick 1973	Succeeded by Bill Lochead
Preceded by Doug Grant and Ed Staniowski	Winner of the Terry Sawchuk Trophy with Doug Grant; 1978–79	Succeeded by Richard Brodeur and Jim Park
