= Doug Grant (ice hockey) =

Canadian ice hockey player

- Born: July 27, 1948 (age 78) Corner Brook, Newfoundland, British Empire
- Height: 6 ft 1 in (185 cm)
- Weight: 200 lb (91 kg; 14 st 4 lb)
- Position: Goaltender
- Caught: Left
- Played for: Detroit Red Wings; St. Louis Blues
- NHL draft: Undrafted
- Playing career: 1966–1982

Douglas Munro Grant (born July 27, 1948) is a Canadian retired professional ice hockey goaltender who played 77 games in the National Hockey League (NHL) for the Detroit Red Wings and St. Louis Blues between 1973 and 1980. The rest of his career, which lasted from 1966 to 1982, was spent in various minor leagues.

== Career ==
Grant played in the inaugural 1960 Quebec International Pee-Wee Hockey Tournament with Corner brook. He played in the Newfoundland Senior Hockey League for the Corner Brook Royals for five seasons as starting goaltender. In 1973-74, his first season in Detroit, he played 37 games, with 15 wins, 16 losses and two ties, with a goals against average of 4.16, and recorded one shutout. After that, Grant bounced between the NHL and the minor leagues, never playing more than 17 games another NHL season, and retired from hockey in 1982.

== Career statistics ==
=== Regular season and playoffs ===
			Regular season									Playoffs
Season	Team	League	GP	W	L	T	MIN	GA	SO	GAA	SV%	GP	W	L	MIN	GA	SO	GAA	SV%
1964–65	Corner Brook Pats	NFLD Jr	—	—	—	—	—	—	—	—	—	—	—	—	—	—	—	—	—
1966–67	Corner Brook Royals	NFLD Sr	23	12	8	2	1360	113	1	4.99	—	3	1	2	190	16	0	5.05	—
1967–68	Corner Brook Royals	NFLD Sr	40	19	16	5	2400	174	0	4.35	—	12	8	4	730	51	1	4.19	—
1967–68	Corner Brook Royals	Al-Cup	—	—	—	—	—	—	—	—	—	8	3	5	464	40	1	5.17	—
1968–69	Corner Brook Royals	NFLD Sr	39	17	18	4	2340	169	3	4.33	—	—	—	—	—	—	—	—	—
1968–69	Corner Brook Royals	Al-Cup	—	—	—	—	—	—	—	—	—	4	1	2	120	20	0	6.00	—
1969–70	Corner Brook Royals	NFLD Sr	40	18	17	5	2400	177	2	4.43	—	7	3	4	429	26	0	3.64	—
1970–71	Corner Brook Royals	NFLD Sr	35	16	13	6	2100	150	2	4.29	—	11	3	8	659	55	0	5.01	—
1971–72	Memorial University	AUAA	14	—	—	—	850	29	2	2.05	—	—	—	—	—	—	—	—	—
1971–72	Fort Worth Texans	CHL	3	2	1	0	180	9	0	3.00	—	—	—	—	—	—	—	—	—
1971–72	Grand Falls Cataracts	Al-Cup	—	—	—	—	—	—	—	—	—	1	0	1	60	6	0	6.00	—
1972–73	Virginia Wings	AHL	51	—	—	—	3037	129	6	2.54	—	12	6	6	717	42	1	3.51	—
1973–74	Detroit Red Wings	NHL	37	15	16	2	2017	140	1	4.16	.870	—	—	—	—	—	—	—	—
1973–74	Virginia Wings	AHL	6	1	2	3	359	20	1	3.34	—	—	—	—	—	—	—	—	—
1974–75	Detroit Red Wings	NHL	7	1	5	0	380	34	0	5.37	.829	3	2	1	180	16	0	5.33	—
1974–75	Virginia Wings	AHL	35	14	11	8	1978	106	1	3.21	—	—	—	—	—	—	—	—	—
1975–76	Detroit Red Wings	NHL	2	1	1	0	120	8	0	4.02	.822	—	—	—	—	—	—	—	—
1975–76	New Haven Nighthawks	AHL	23	8	13	2	1392	95	0	4.10	—	—	—	—	—	—	—	—	—
1976–77	St. Louis Blues	NHL	17	7	7	3	960	50	1	3.13	.877	—	—	—	—	—	—	—	—
1976–77	Kansas City Blues	CHL	20	10	6	4	1199	57	3	2.85	—	—	—	—	—	—	—	—	—
1977–78	St. Louis Blues	NHL	8	3	3	2	499	24	0	2.89	.896	—	—	—	—	—	—	—	—
1977–78	Salt Lake Golden Eagles	CHL	35	17	13	3	2068	107	1	3.10	—	—	—	—	—	—	—	—	—
1978–79	St. Louis Blues	NHL	4	0	2	1	190	23	0	7.28	.811	—	—	—	—	—	—	—	—
1978–79	Salt Lake Golden Eagles	CHL	31	15	12	3	1871	91	3	2.92	—	4	1	2	198	15	0	4.54	—
1979–80	St. Louis Blues	NHL	1	0	0	0	31	1	0	1.95	.923	—	—	—	—	—	—	—	—
1979–80	Salt Lake Golden Eagles	CHL	38	24	12	2	2283	130	1	3.42	—	9	7	2	483	27	0	3.35	—
1980–81	Salt Lake Golden Eagles	CHL	5	3	1	0	260	14	1	3.23	—	—	—	—	—	—	—	—	—
1981–82	Salt Lake Golden Eagles	CHL	7	2	3	0	354	34	0	5.76	—	—	—	—	—	—	—	—	—
NHL totals			77	27	34	8	4195	280	2	4.01	.866	—	—	—	—	—	—	—	—

Preceded by Yves Belanger and Gord McRae	Winner of the Terry Sawchuk Trophy with Ed Staniowski; 1977–78	Succeeded by Doug Grant and Terry Richardson
Preceded by Doug Grant and Ed Staniowski	Winner of the Terry Sawchuk Trophy with Terry Richardson; 1978–79	Succeeded by Richard Brodeur and Jim Park
