= Richard Brodeur =

Canadian ice hockey player

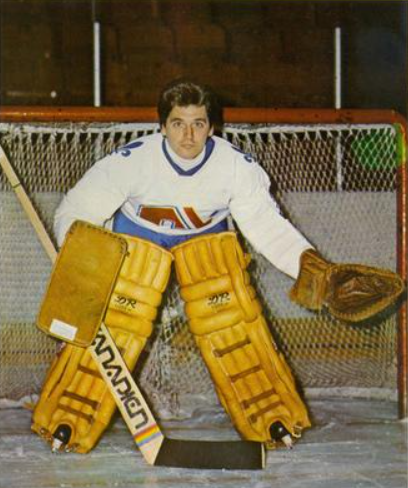
- Brodeur in 1979 with the Quebec Nordiques
- Born: September 15, 1952 (age 74) Longueuil, Quebec, Canada
- Height: 5 ft 7 in (170 cm)
- Weight: 185 lb (84 kg; 13 st 3 lb)
- Position: Goaltender
- Caught: Left
- Played for: Quebec Nordiques; New York Islanders; Vancouver Canucks; Hartford Whalers
- NHL draft: 97th overall, 1972; New York Islanders
- Playing career: 1972–1988

Richard Brodeur (born September 15, 1952) is a Canadian former professional ice hockey goaltender. He was one of a select group of goaltenders to play in every season of the seven-year existence of the World Hockey Association, doing so with the Quebec Nordiques. Nicknamed "King Richard" and "Kermit", Brodeur was the starting goaltender for each of Quebec's runs to the Avco Cup Final, where they lost in 1975 and won in 1977. He moved over to the National Hockey League (NHL) in 1979, playing just two games before being moved to the Central Hockey League (CHL). He then was moved over to the Vancouver Canucks in 1980, where he played the next eight seasons and led the team to their first ever Stanley Cup Final appearance in 1982. He closed out his career with six games with the Hartford Whalers in 1987 and play with their American Hockey League (AHL) affiliate in Binghamton in 1988.

== Early life ==
Brodeur was born in Longueuil, Quebec and grew up in Montreal, Quebec.

== Playing career ==
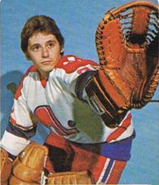
Brodeur on a 1975 card

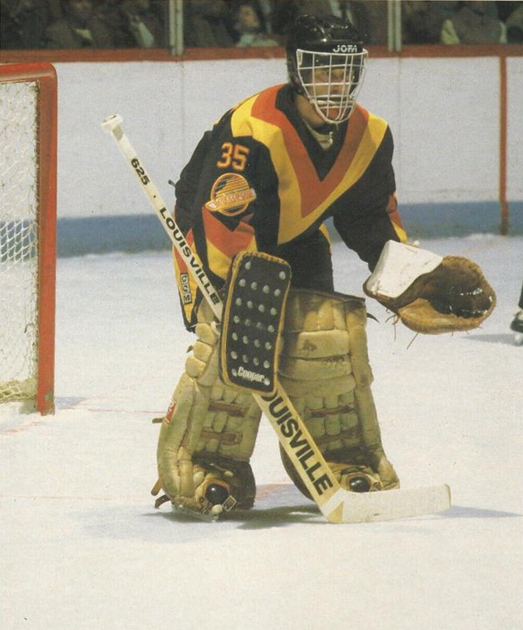
Dimanche/Derniere-Heure photo of Richard Brodeur for the Vancouver Canucks, c. 1982-1983

Brodeur was selected in the 1972 NHL entry draft by the New York Islanders, but chose instead to play in the World Hockey Association with the Quebec Nordiques, for whom he played for seven seasons. The 1975–76 season was his best; he played 69 games and won 44 of them. In 1976–77, he helped his team win the Avco World Trophy.

When the WHA folded following the 1978–79 season, he was protected as one of the Nordiques' priority selections, then was traded to the Islanders for Göran Högosta. However, he only played two games for them as he was the third goalie behind Billy Smith and Chico Resch, and was traded to the Vancouver Canucks in 1980. In his second season with the Canucks, he guided the team during their playoff run to the Final, which they lost to Brodeur's old team, the Islanders.

Brodeur was selected to play in the 1983 All-Star Game, but couldn't play due to an ear injury suffered in Toronto three days earlier. He remained with the Canucks for almost eight seasons, then was traded near the end of the 1987–88 NHL season to the Hartford Whalers, where he ended his NHL career. He was the last active NHL player from the WHA's inaugural season, and the last to have played in all seven seasons of the WHA's existence. In his professional career between two leagues, he went 296–289–74 as goaltender.

After his retirement, he founded his own hockey school in the Vancouver area. He also briefly worked as an analyst on Quebec Nordiques French TV telecasts.

He has been noted as the goaltender on whom Wayne Gretzky scored the most goals, with 29.

== Awards ==
- Stafford Smythe Memorial Trophy, MVP Memorial Cup (Cornwall Royals) 1972 (Inaugural Winner).
- Terry Sawchuk Trophy (CHL) - 1979-1980
- Named to the NHL All-Star Game - 1983
- Cyclone Taylor Award (Vancouver Canucks) - 1981, 1982, 1985
- Molson Cup (Most Canucks three-star selections) - 1980–81, 1981–82, 1984–85, 1985–86
- World Hockey Association Hall of Fame - 2010 - Inaugural Inductee

== Personal life ==
Brodeur is an artist, using oil on canvas, and has had several shows at Diskin Galleries in Vancouver.

== Career statistics ==
Bold indicates led league

			Regular season									Playoffs
Season	Team	League	GP	W	L	T	MIN	GA	SO	GAA	SV%	GP	W	L	T	MIN	GA	SO	GAA	SV%
1970–71	Verdun Maple Leafs	QJHL	6	1	4	1	360	47	0	7.83	.813	—	—	—	—	—	—	—	—	—
1970–71	Cornwall Royals	QJHL	35	—	—	—	2100	144	0	4.11	.879	—	—	—	—	—	—	—	—	—
1971–72	Cornwall Royals	QMJHL	58	—	—	—	3481	170	5	2.93	.914	16	12	3	1	960	44	0	2.75	.922
1971–72	Cornwall Royals	M-Cup	—	—	—	—	—	—	—	—	—	3	2	1	—	179	4	1	1.34	—
1972–73	Quebec Nordiques	WHA	24	5	14	2	1288	102	0	4.75	.861	—	—	—	—	—	—	—	—	—
1973–74	Quebec Nordiques	WHA	30	15	12	1	1607	89	1	3.32	.901	—	—	—	—	—	—	—	—	—
1973–74	Maine Nordiques	NAHL	16	10	5	1	927	47	0	3.04	—	—	—	—	—	—	—	—	—	—
1974–75	Quebec Nordiques	WHA	51	29	21	0	2938	188	0	3.90	.892	**15**	8	7	—	906	**48**	1	3.18	.913
1975–76	Quebec Nordiques	WHA	**69**	44	21	2	3967	**244**	2	3.69	.890	5	1	4	—	299	22	0	4.41	—
1976–77	Quebec Nordiques	WHA	53	29	18	2	2906	167	2	3.45	.880	17	12	5	—	1007	55	**1**	3.28	.882
1977–78	Quebec Nordiques	WHA	36	18	15	2	1962	121	0	3.70	.892	11	5	5	—	622	**38**	**1**	3.67	—
1978–79	Quebec Nordiques	WHA	42	25	13	3	2433	126	**3**	3.11	.901	3	0	2	—	114	14	0	7.37	—
1979–80	New York Islanders	NHL	2	1	0	0	80	6	0	4.50	.829	—	—	—	—	—	—	—	—	—
1979–80	Indianapolis Checkers	CHL	46	22	19	5	2722	131	4	2.88	—	6	3	3	—	357	12	1	2.02	—
1980–81	Vancouver Canucks	NHL	52	17	18	**16**	3024	177	0	3.51	.884	3	0	3	—	185	13	0	4.22	.852
1981–82	Vancouver Canucks	NHL	52	20	18	12	3010	168	2	3.35	.891	17	11	6	—	1089	**49**	0	2.70	**.917**
1982–83	Vancouver Canucks	NHL	58	21	26	8	3291	208	0	3.79	.873	3	0	3	—	193	13	0	4.04	.849
1983–84	Vancouver Canucks	NHL	36	10	21	5	2110	141	1	4.01	.868	4	1	3	—	222	12	1	3.24	.896
1984–85	Vancouver Canucks	NHL	51	16	27	6	2930	**228**	0	4.67	.855	—	—	—	—	—	—	—	—	—
1984–85	Fredericton Express	AHL	4	3	0	1	249	13	0	3.13	.898	—	—	—	—	—	—	—	—	—
1985–86	Vancouver Canucks	NHL	**64**	19	**32**	8	3541	**240**	2	4.07	.861	2	0	2	—	120	12	0	6.00	.848
1986–87	Vancouver Canucks	NHL	53	20	25	5	2972	178	1	3.59	.872	—	—	—	—	—	—	—	—	—
1987–88	Vancouver Canucks	NHL	11	3	6	2	668	49	0	4.40	.859	—	—	—	—	—	—	—	—	—
1987–88	Fredericton Express	AHL	2	0	1	0	99	8	0	4.85	.862	—	—	—	—	—	—	—	—	—
1987–88	Hartford Whalers	NHL	6	4	2	0	339	15	0	2.65	.894	4	1	3	—	199	12	0	3.62	.862
1988–89	Binghamton Whalers	AHL	6	1	2	0	222	21	0	5.68	.824	—	—	—	—	—	—	—	—	—
WHA totals			305	165	114	12	17,101	1037	8	3.64	.889	51	26	23	—	2948	177	3	3.60	—
NHL totals			385	131	175	62	21,966	1410	6	3.85	.872	33	13	30	—	2008	111	1	3.32	.894

"Brodeur's stats". The Goaltender Home Page.

Preceded by new award first recipient	Winner of the Stafford Smythe Memorial Trophy; 1972 Memorial Cup	Succeeded by Mark Howe
Preceded by Doug Grant and Terry Richardson	Winner of the Terry Sawchuk Trophy with Jim Park; 1979–80	Succeeded by Paul Harrison and Ken Ellacott
