= Ullyot =

Ullyot is a surname. Notable people with the surname include:

- Joan Ullyot (1940–2021), American runner and physician
- Ronald Ullyot (born 1946), Canadian ice hockey player and coach
- Ted Ullyot, American lawyer and government official
