= Kelly Hrudey =

Canadian ice hockey player and broadcaster

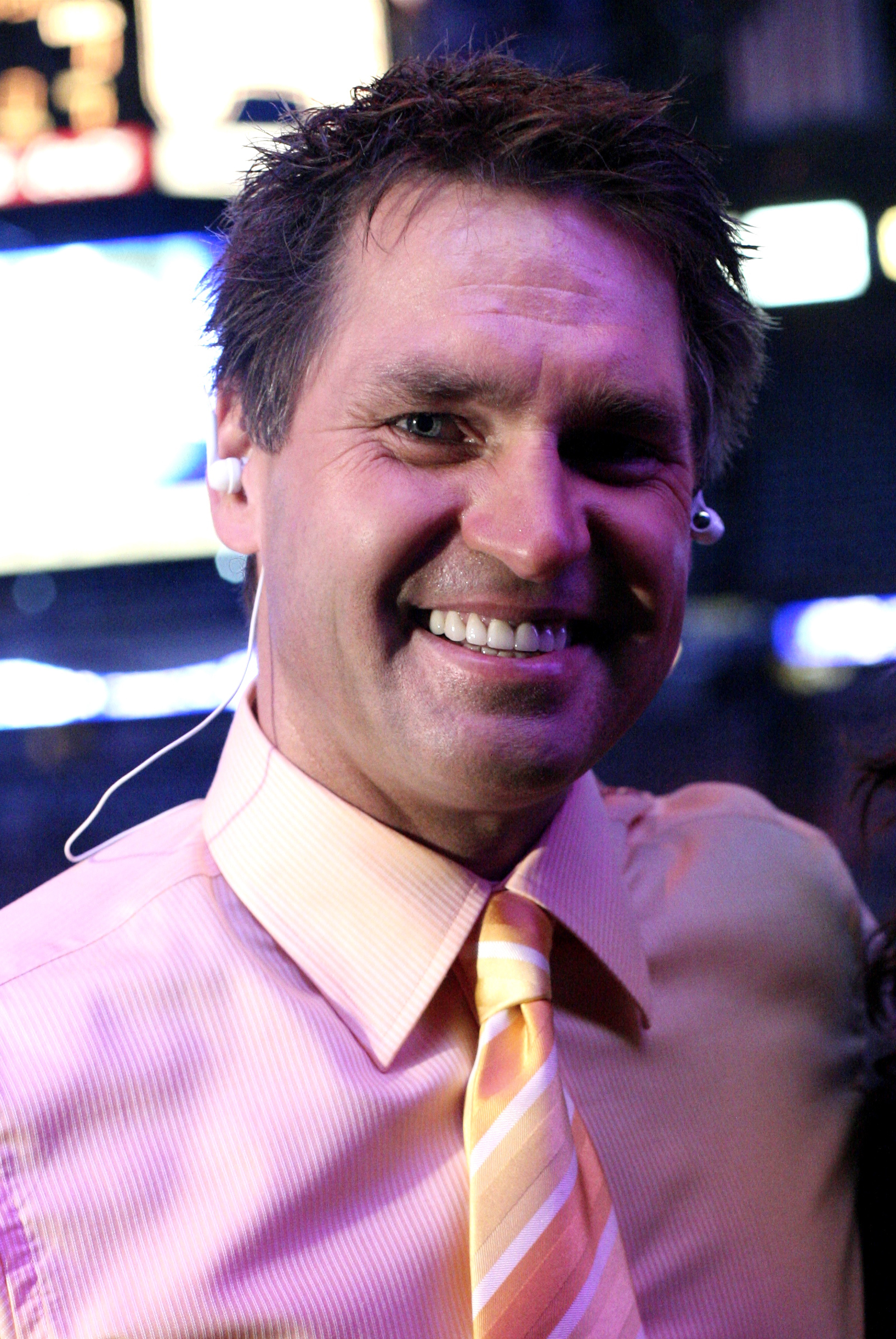
- Hrudey in 2006
- Born: January 13, 1961 (age 65) Edmonton, Alberta, Canada
- Height: 5 ft 10 in (178 cm)
- Weight: 190 lb (86 kg; 13 st 8 lb)
- Position: Goaltender
- Caught: Left
- Played for: New York Islanders; Los Angeles Kings; San Jose Sharks
- National team: Canada
- NHL draft: 38th overall, 1980; New York Islanders
- Playing career: 1981–1998

Kelly Hrudey (/ˈruːdi/; born January 13, 1961) is a Canadian former professional ice hockey goaltender and former broadcaster with Sportsnet as a studio analyst for Hockey Night in Canada and colour commentator for Calgary Flames regional broadcasts. During his playing career, Hrudey played in the National Hockey League (NHL) for the New York Islanders, Los Angeles Kings, and San Jose Sharks from 1983 to 1998.

== Playing career ==
Hrudey played junior ice hockey for three years with the Medicine Hat Tigers of the Western Hockey League (WHL), being named to WHL Second All-Star Team in 1980–81. On June 11, 1980, Kelly was drafted in the second round (38th overall) of the 1980 NHL entry draft by the New York Islanders. Hrudey played for the Indianapolis Checkers, New York's Central Hockey League (CHL) affiliate, before joining the Islanders.

=== New York Islanders ===
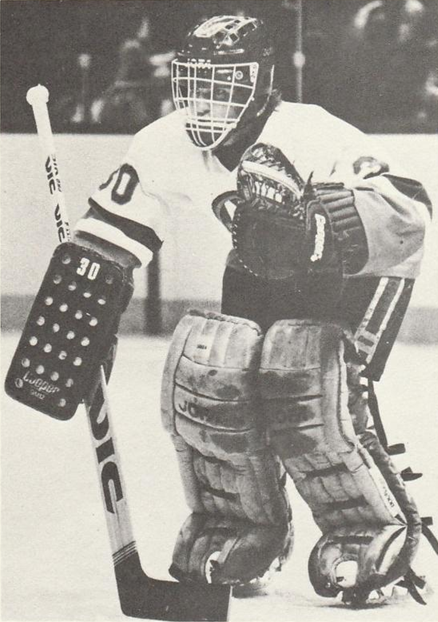
1983 photo of Hrudey for New York Islanders

With Hall of Famer Billy Smith entrenched in the Islanders net, Hrudey managed to begin splitting the goaltending duties starting in the 1984–85, his first full season with the club. Hrudey's arrival allowed the Islanders to trade goaltender Roland Melanson to the Minnesota North Stars for a first-round pick.

Hrudey was the Islanders' goaltender during the seventh game of the division semifinals series against the Washington Capitals on April 18, 1987, when New York defeated the Capitals in the longest game in franchise history, a four-overtime game seven known as the "Easter Epic", which was won on a goal by Pat LaFontaine after 68:47 minutes of overtime. Hrudey made 73 saves in a 3–2 victory. Hrudey's 73 saves in a single game was an NHL record until Joonas Korpisalo's 85-save performance for the Columbus Blue Jackets in a 3–2 five-overtime loss to the Tampa Bay Lightning during the first round series of the 2020 Stanley Cup playoffs on August 11, 2020.

Later in 1987, he was the third string goaltender on Canada senior team during the 1987 Canada Cup, but did not appear in a game.

=== Los Angeles Kings ===
Despite finishing in the top five in voting for the Vezina Trophy as the league's top goaltender in two of his final three seasons in New York, Hrudey was traded to the Los Angeles Kings on February 22, 1989.

Hrudey was initially angry about the trade, because he had always dreamt of playing his career with one club, but he quickly adjusted and became an important part of the Wayne Gretzky-era Kings. Since his usual number #30 was retired by the Kings in honor of Rogie Vachon, Hrudey switched to number #32; he would wear this number for the rest of his playing career. His most notable moment with Los Angeles was playing in the 1993 Stanley Cup Final where the Kings lost to the Montreal Canadiens. In the 1994 NHL entry draft, the Kings selected goaltender Jamie Storr with a seventh overall pick, and with him projected as the Kings' goaltender of the future, they let Hrudey test free agency when his contract ended. While it was time for him to move on, Hrudey appreciated his time with the Kings, saying "It was maybe the best eight years of my life playing hockey. I loved the management and the ownership. Just a wonderful place to spend eight seasons."

=== San Jose Sharks ===
On July 18, 1996, in what Hrudey called "a pretty easy decision," he signed a two-year deal with the San Jose Sharks. Hrudey served as the Sharks' starting goaltender for the 1996–97 season until late January 1997, when the club traded for All-Star goaltender Ed Belfour. With Belfour on the roster, Hrudey was pushed into the backup role. Belfour left as a free agent at the end of the season, but the Sharks acquired another veteran in Mike Vernon, and once again Hrudey played a support role, making 28 appearances, and managing just four wins. After the 1997–98 season, Hrudey retired on July 30, 1998, and joined CBC Television's Hockey Night in Canada as an analyst.

== Broadcasting career ==
During the latter years of his playing career, he often joined Hockey Night in Canada as a studio analyst to supplement their playoff coverage if his team missed or was eliminated from Stanley Cup playoffs. After retiring, he joined the show full-time as a studio analyst. He was featured in the "Behind the Mask" segment with hosts Scott Russell and later Scott Oake during the first intermission of the second game of Saturday night doubleheaders. In 2007, Hrudey helped debut Hockey Night in Canada Radio. The show originating from Toronto with host Jeff Marek is a three-hour program dedicated to ice hockey. The show is broadcast on Sirius XM Channel 122 and 97. Hrudey co-hosts Monday and Wednesday from his home studio in Calgary. For the 2008–09 season, he began working alongside host Ron MacLean and Elliotte Friedman on HNIC's lead studio team.

Hrudey also made a weekly appearance on the TSN 1040 in Vancouver with Rick Ball.

With Rogers Media, the parent company of Sportsnet, gaining the sole national rights to the NHL beginning in the 2014–15 season, in August 2014, Hrudey joined Sportsnet full-time to participate in their ice hockey coverage. In addition to his Hockey Night in Canada role, he along with Ball became the new announcers for the Calgary Flames regional broadcasts. In August 2026, Hrudey announced on X that Sportsnet was not renewing his contract, and thanked the viewers as well as his colleagues both in front of and behind the camera. He stated that he was not retiring.

== Personal life ==
Hrudey and his wife have three children and live in Alberta. Hrudey does advocacy work in the field of mental health, inspired in part by his daughter's struggles with anxiety and obsessive-compulsive disorder. He received an honorary degree from Mount Royal University on November 3, 2017, for his mental health advocacy efforts. He is of Ukrainian descent.

== Career statistics ==
=== Regular season and playoffs ===
			Regular season									Playoffs
Season	Team	League	GP	W	L	T	MIN	GA	SO	GAA	SV%	GP	W	L	MIN	GA	SO	GAA	SV%
1978–79	Medicine Hat Tigers	WHL	57	12	34	7	3,093	318	0	6.17	—	—	—	—	—	—	—	—	—
1979–80	Medicine Hat Tigers	WHL	57	25	23	4	3,049	212	1	4.17	.899	13	6	6	638	48	0	4.51	—
1980–81	Medicine Hat Tigers	WHL	55	32	19	1	3,023	200	4	3.97	.895	4	1	3	244	17	0	4.18	—
1980–81	Indianapolis Checkers	CHL	—	—	—	—	—	—	—	—	—	2	—	—	135	8	0	3.56	—
1981–82	Indianapolis Checkers	CHL	51	27	19	4	3,033	149	1	2.95	.900	13	11	2	842	34	1	2.42	—
1982–83	Indianapolis Checkers	CHL	47	26	17	1	2,744	139	2	3.04	.894	10	7	3	637	28	0	2.64	—
1983–84	New York Islanders	NHL	12	7	2	0	535	28	0	3.14	.903	—	—	—	—	—	—	—	—
1983–84	Indianapolis Checkers	CHL	6	3	2	1	370	21	0	3.40	—	—	—	—	—	—	—	—	—
1984–85	New York Islanders	NHL	41	19	17	3	2,335	141	2	3.62	.886	5	1	3	281	8	0	1.71	.946
1985–86	New York Islanders	NHL	45	19	15	8	2,563	137	1	3.21	.906	2	0	2	120	6	0	3.00	.898
1986–87	New York Islanders	NHL	46	21	15	7	2,634	145	0	3.30	.881	14	7	7	842	38	0	2.71	.918
1987–88	New York Islanders	NHL	47	22	17	5	2,751	153	3	3.34	.896	6	2	4	380	23	0	3.62	.851
1988–89	New York Islanders	NHL	50	18	24	3	2,800	183	0	3.92	.874	—	—	—	—	—	—	—	—
1988–89	Los Angeles Kings	NHL	16	10	4	2	974	47	1	2.90	.904	10	4	6	566	35	0	3.71	.881
1989–90	Los Angeles Kings	NHL	52	22	21	6	2,860	194	2	4.07	.873	9	4	4	539	39	0	3.62	.853
1990–91	Los Angeles Kings	NHL	47	26	13	6	2,730	132	3	2.90	.900	12	6	6	798	37	0	2.78	.903
1991–92	Los Angeles Kings	NHL	60	27	17	13	3,509	197	1	3.37	.897	6	2	4	355	22	0	3.72	.877
1992–93	Los Angeles Kings	NHL	50	18	21	6	2,718	175	2	3.86	.897	20	10	10	1,261	74	0	3.52	.887
1993–94	Los Angeles Kings	NHL	64	22	31	7	3,713	228	1	3.68	.897	—	—	—	—	—	—	—	—
1994–95	Los Angeles Kings	NHL	25	14	13	5	1,894	99	0	3.14	.910	—	—	—	—	—	—	—	—
1995–96	Phoenix Roadrunners	IHL	1	0	1	0	50	5	0	5.95	.828	—	—	—	—	—	—	—	—
1995–96	Los Angeles Kings	NHL	36	7	15	10	2,077	113	0	3.26	.907	—	—	—	—	—	—	—	—
1996–97	San Jose Sharks	NHL	48	16	24	5	26,31	140	0	3.19	.889	—	—	—	—	—	—	—	—
1997–98	San Jose Sharks	NHL	28	4	16	2	1,360	62	1	2.74	.897	1	0	0	20	1	0	3.00	.833
NHL totals			677	271	265	88	38,081	2174	17	3.43	.893	85	36	46	5,161	283	0	3.29	.891

=== International ===
Year	Team	Event	GP	W	L	T	MIN	GA	SO	GAA	SV%
1986	Canada	WC	5	—	—	0	299	22	0	4.41	—
Senior totals			5	—	—	0	299	22	0	4.41	—

Preceded by Paul Harrison; Ken Ellacott	Winner of the Terry Sawchuk Trophy; 1981–82, 1982–83; With: Robert Holland	Succeeded by None
Preceded by Bobby Francis	Winner of the Tommy Ivan Trophy; 1982–83	Succeeded by Bruce Affleck; John Vanbiesbrouck
