= Don Luce =

Canadian ice hockey player (born 1948)

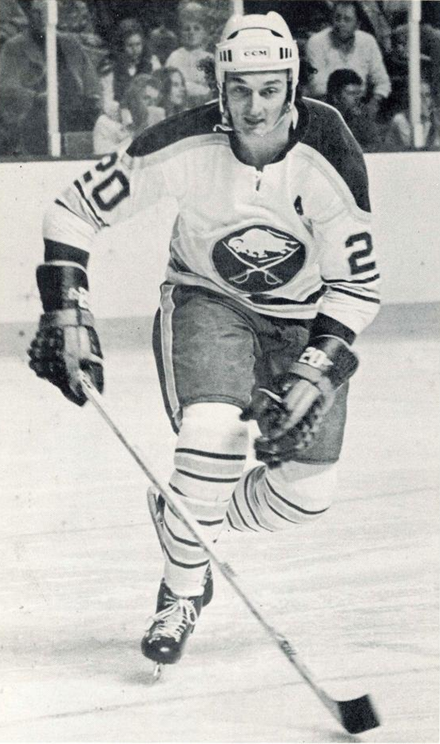
- Luce with the Buffalo Sabres c. 1974
- Born: October 2, 1948 (age 77) London, Ontario, Canada
- Height: 6 ft 2 in (188 cm)
- Weight: 190 lb (86 kg; 13 st 8 lb)
- Position: Centre
- Shot: Left
- Played for: New York Rangers; Detroit Red Wings; Buffalo Sabres; Los Angeles Kings; Toronto Maple Leafs
- NHL draft: 14th overall, 1966; New York Rangers
- Playing career: 1968–1982

Donald Harold Luce (born October 2, 1948) is a Canadian former professional ice hockey centre, executive and scout. Luce played 13 seasons in the National Hockey League (NHL) for the New York Rangers, Detroit Red Wings, Buffalo Sabres, Los Angeles Kings and Toronto Maple Leafs from 1969 to 1982.

After his playing career, Luce moved into a long career in player development for the Sabres and the Philadelphia Flyers. He is currently working as a pro scout for the Toronto Maple Leafs.

== Playing career ==
Luce was drafted by the New York Rangers and played three seasons (1965–68) for their farm team, the Kitchener Rangers in Kitchener, Ontario. He then played one and a half seasons with another Rangers farm team, the Omaha Knights, before being brought up to the NHL team for the last 12 games of 1969–70.

Luce scored his first NHL goal on March 15, 1970 in his team's 4-2 home loss to the Minnesota North Stars. It was his only goal as a New York Ranger.

During the 1970–1971 season he was traded to the Detroit Red Wings, where he played 58 games before being dealt again, this time to the Buffalo Sabres, for whom he then played until 1981. Luce was awarded the Bill Masterton Trophy, awarded to the NHL player annually who best demonstrates the qualities of perseverance, leadership and dedication to the sport of hockey, for the 1974-75 season.

In the middle of the 1980–81 season he was traded to the Los Angeles Kings, and finished his career the following season with the Toronto Maple Leafs.

Luce was inducted into the Buffalo Sabres Hall of Fame in 1986 and also served as an assistant coach for the Buffalo Sabres in 1986–87. He served as the Sabres' head of player development from the end of his term as assistant coach until July 2006, when the team let him go and cut much of its scouting department. Luce had been responsible for bringing in the likes of Alexander Mogilny, Maxim Afinogenov, Martin Biron, Brian Campbell, and Jason Pominville.

He is remembered among Sabres fans for his work ethic on the ice, his abilities on the penalty kill, his work in the team's front office, and in the community where he and his wife Diane continue to support even though they are no longer affiliated with the Sabres.

Luce played 894 career NHL games, scoring 225 goals and 329 assists for 554 points. His best statistical season was the 1974–75 season with the Buffalo Sabres, when he set career highs in goals (33), points (76), shorthanded goals (8), and plus minus with a +61 rating.

Luce was appointed director of player development for the Philadelphia Flyers on December 1, 2006 and served in that position through the 2011–12 season.

On September 20, 2015, it was announced that Luce had been hired as a professional scout for the Toronto Maple Leafs.

== Personal life ==
Luce's grandson Griffin played NCAA Division 1 hockey for the University of Michigan.

== Career statistics ==
| | | | Regular season | | | | | Playoffs |
| Season | Team | League | GP | G | A | Pts | PIM | GP | G | A | Pts | PIM |
|---|---|---|---|---|---|---|---|---|---|---|---|---|
| 1965–66 | Kitchener Rangers | OHA-Jr. | 47 | 16 | 19 | 35 | 71 | 19 | 4 | 12 | 16 | 20 |
| 1966–67 | Kitchener Rangers | OHA-Jr. | 48 | 19 | 42 | 61 | 94 | 13 | 7 | 9 | 16 | 35 |
| 1967–68 | Kitchener Rangers | OHA-Jr. | 54 | 24 | 70 | 94 | 88 | 19 | 4 | 8 | 12 | 52 |
| 1968–69 | Omaha Knights | CHL | 72 | 22 | 34 | 56 | 56 | 7 | 3 | 4 | 7 | 11 |
| 1969–70 | New York Rangers | NHL | 12 | 1 | 2 | 3 | 8 | 5 | 0 | 1 | 1 | 4 |
| 1969–70 | Omaha Knights | CHL | 64 | 22 | 35 | 57 | 82 | 2 | 1 | 2 | 3 | 4 |
| 1970–71 | New York Rangers | NHL | 9 | 0 | 1 | 1 | 0 | — | — | — | — | — |
| 1970–71 | Detroit Red Wings | NHL | 58 | 3 | 11 | 14 | 18 | — | — | — | — | — |
| 1971–72 | Buffalo Sabres | NHL | 78 | 11 | 8 | 19 | 38 | — | — | — | — | — |
| 1972–73 | Buffalo Sabres | NHL | 78 | 18 | 25 | 43 | 32 | 6 | 1 | 1 | 2 | 2 |
| 1973–74 | Buffalo Sabres | NHL | 75 | 26 | 30 | 56 | 44 | — | — | — | — | — |
| 1974–75 | Buffalo Sabres | NHL | 80 | 33 | 43 | 76 | 45 | 16 | 5 | 8 | 13 | 19 |
| 1975–76 | Buffalo Sabres | NHL | 77 | 21 | 49 | 70 | 42 | 9 | 4 | 3 | 7 | 6 |
| 1976–77 | Buffalo Sabres | NHL | 80 | 26 | 43 | 69 | 16 | 6 | 3 | 1 | 4 | 2 |
| 1977–78 | Buffalo Sabres | NHL | 78 | 26 | 35 | 61 | 24 | 8 | 0 | 2 | 2 | 6 |
| 1978–79 | Buffalo Sabres | NHL | 79 | 26 | 35 | 61 | 14 | 3 | 1 | 1 | 2 | 0 |
| 1979–80 | Buffalo Sabres | NHL | 80 | 14 | 29 | 43 | 30 | 14 | 3 | 3 | 6 | 11 |
| 1980–81 | Buffalo Sabres | NHL | 61 | 15 | 13 | 28 | 19 | — | — | — | — | — |
| 1980–81 | Los Angeles Kings | NHL | 10 | 1 | 0 | 1 | 2 | 4 | 0 | 2 | 2 | 2 |
| 1981–82 | Toronto Maple Leafs | NHL | 39 | 4 | 4 | 8 | 32 | — | — | — | — | — |
| 1981–82 | Salt Lake Golden Eagles | CHL | 2 | 1 | 0 | 1 | 4 | 10 | 2 | 5 | 7 | 8 |
| NHL totals | | | 894 | 225 | 328 | 553 | 364 | 71 | 17 | 22 | 39 | 52 |
