= Jim Park (ice hockey) =

Canadian ice hockey player (born 1952)

- Born: June 22, 1952 (age 74) Toronto, Ontario, Canada
- Height: 6 ft 1 in (185 cm)
- Weight: 190 lb (86 kg; 13 st 8 lb)
- Position: Goaltender
- Caught: Left
- Played for: WHA; Indianapolis Racers; EHL; Jersey Devils; IHL; Des Moines Capitols; Fort Wayne Komets; AHL; Richmond Robins; NAHL; Mohawk Valley Comets; CHL; Oklahoma City Blazers; Indianapolis Checkers; PHL; Phoenix Roadrunners; Los Angeles Blades
- NHL draft: Undrafted
- Playing career: 1972–1982

James Park (born June 22, 1952) is a Canadian former professional ice hockey goaltender and the creator of a series of instructional tapes for hockey goaltenders entitled "The Puck Stops Here" (1986).

== Early life ==
Park was born in Toronto. As a youth, he played in the 1964 and 1965 Quebec International Pee-Wee Hockey Tournaments with a minor ice hockey team from Don Mills, and then the Toronto Shopsy's team.

== Career ==
Between 1975 and 1978, Park played three seasons and 54 games with the Indianapolis Racers of the World Hockey Association (WHA). He later operated his own academy for goaltenders.

== Personal life ==
Park is the father of former Ontario MPP Lindsey Park.

== Awards and honors ==
Award	Year
Terry Sawchuk Trophy (with Richard Brodeur) - Indianapolis Checkers	1979–80

== Career statistics ==
=== Regular season and playoffs ===
			Regular season									Playoffs
Season	Team	League	GP	W	L	T	MIN	GA	SO	GAA	SV%	GP	W	L	MIN	GA	SO	GAA	SV%
1970–71	Cornwall Royals	QMJHL	—	—	—	3	0	9.00	.769
1971–72	Smiths Falls Bears	CJHL	43	Statistics Unavailable
1972–73	Jersey Devils	EHL	31	—	—	—	—	120	0	3.87	—	—	—	—	—	—	—	—
1972–73	Des Moines Capitols	IHL	11	—	—	—	631	37	0	3.67	—	2	—	—	—	—	—	—	—
1972–73	Richmond Robins	AHL	4	—	—	—	170	8	0	2.82	—
1973–74	Des Moines Capitols	IHL	32	—	—	—	1418	89	1	3.77		1	—	—	—	—	—	—	—
1974–75	Mohawk Valley Comets	NAHL	50	20	25	3	2842	220	0	4.64	—	1	—	—	—	—	—	—	—
1975–76	Indianapolis Racers	WHA	11	6	4	0	572	23	0	2.41	.923	6	3	2	293	12	2	2.45
1975–76	Mohawk Valley Comets	NAHL	38	17	16	3	2245	164	0	4.38	—	4	—	—	—	—	—	—	—
1976–77	Indianapolis Racers	WHA	31	14	12	4	1727	114	1	3.96	.873	—	—	—	—	—	—	—	—
1976–77	Oklahoma City Blazers	CHL	3	1	2	0	179	11	0	3.69	.903	—	—	—	—	—	—	—	—
1976–77	Mohawk Valley Comets	NAHL	1	1	0	0	60	2	0	2.00	.955	—	—	—	—	—	—	—	—
1977–78	Indianapolis Racers	WHA	12	3	7	0	584	41	0	4.21	.873	—	—	—	—	—	—	—	—
1978–79	Phoenix Roadrunners	PHL	15	Statistics Unavailable
1978–79	Los Angeles Blades	PHL	19	Statistics Unavailable
1979–80	Indianapolis Checkers	CHL	37	18	13	2	2101	105	2	3.00	.892	1	—	—	—	—	—	—	—
1980–81	Indianapolis Checkers	CHL	6	1	4	1	348	27	0	4.66	.829	—	—	—	—	—	—	—	—
1981–82	Fort Wayne Komets	IHL	53	—	—	—	2874	209	1	4.36	—	1	—	—	—	—	—	—	—
WHA totals			54	23	23	4	2883	178	1	3.70	.883	6	3	2	293	12	2	2.45

Preceded by Doug Grant and Terry Richardson	Winner of the Terry Sawchuk Trophy with Richard Brodeur; 1979–80	Succeeded by Paul Harrison and Ken Ellacott
