= Robert Holland (ice hockey) =

Canadian ice hockey player

- Born: September 10, 1957 (age 69) Montreal, Quebec, Canada
- Height: 6 ft 1 in (185 cm)
- Weight: 185 lb (84 kg; 13 st 3 lb)
- Position: Goaltender
- Caught: Left
- Played for: Pittsburgh Penguins
- NHL draft: 64th overall, 1977; Montreal Canadiens
- Playing career: 1977–1987

Robert "Robbie" Holland (born September 10, 1957) is a Canadian former professional ice hockey goaltender. He played 44 games in the National Hockey League (NHL) with the Pittsburgh Penguins during the 1979–80 and 1980–81 seasons. The rest of his career, which lasted from 1977 to 1987, was spent in the minor leagues.

== Early life and education ==
Holland was born in Montreal. As a youth, he played in the 1970 Quebec International Pee-Wee Hockey Tournament with a minor ice hockey team from Ville-Émard.

== Career ==
Holland was selected by the Montreal Canadiens in the fourth round (64th overall) of the 1977 NHL amateur draft. He played 44 games in the National Hockey League with the Pittsburgh Penguins.

== Career statistics ==
=== Regular season and playoffs ===
			Regular season									Playoffs
Season	Team	League	GP	W	L	T	MIN	GA	SO	GAA	SV%	GP	W	L	MIN	GA	SO	GAA	SV%
1975–76	Montreal Juniors	QMJHL	37	17	16	2	1995	147	0	4.42	.862	6	2	4	360	21	0	3.50	.897
1976–77	Montreal Juniors	QMJHL	45	17	21	3	2314	184	0	4.77	.866	13	—	—	780	64	0	4.92	.861
1977–78	Nova Scotia Voyageurs	AHL	38	13	14	11	2270	120	1	3.17	—	5	3	2	299	14	0	2.81	—
1978–79	Nova Scotia Voyageurs	AHL	43	18	19	2	2377	154	2	3.89	—	1	0	1	60	7	0	7.00	—
1979–80	Pittsburgh Penguins	NHL	34	10	17	6	1969	126	1	3.84	.864	—	—	—	—	—	—	—	—
1980–81	Pittsburgh Penguins	NHL	10	1	5	3	539	45	0	5.01	.850	—	—	—	—	—	—	—	—
1980–81	Binghamton Whalers	AHL	7	1	4	0	354	28	0	4.75	—	—	—	—	—	—	—	—	—
1980–81	Indianapolis Checkers	CHL	15	6	6	2	845	41	1	2.91	—	3	—	—	179	13	0	4.36	—
1981–82	Indianapolis Checkers	CHL	30	15	11	1	1672	95	0	3.41	—	—	—	—	—	—	—	—	—
1981–82	Toledo Goaldiggers	IHL	7	—	—	—	423	25	0	3.55	—	—	—	—	—	—	—	—	—
1982–83	Indianapolis Checkers	CHL	37	24	11	1	2111	101	4	2.87	—	3	2	1	200	13	0	3.90	—
1983–84	Indianapolis Checkers	CHL	39	—	—	—	2149	131	0	3.66	—	7	—	—	379	22	0	3.48	—
1984–85	Indianapolis Checkers	IHL	57	—	—	—	3344	184	4	3.28	—	6	—	—	359	21	1	3.51	—
1985–86	Springfield Indians	AHL	8	6	2	0	478	23	0	2.88	—	—	—	—	—	—	—	—	—
1985–86	Indianapolis Checkers	IHL	44	—	—	—	2246	146	0	3.90	—	4	—	—	182	15	0	4.94	—
1986–87	Milwaukee Admirals	IHL	66	—	—	—	3915	268	1	4.11	—	6	—	—	360	30	0	5.00	—
NHL totals			44	11	22	9	2508	171	1	4.09	.861	—	—	—	—	—	—	—	—

Preceded by Paul Harrison and Ken Ellacott	Winner of the Terry Sawchuk Trophy with Kelly Hrudey; 1981–82 and 1982–83	Succeeded by ?
