= Ed Staniowski =

Canadian ice hockey player

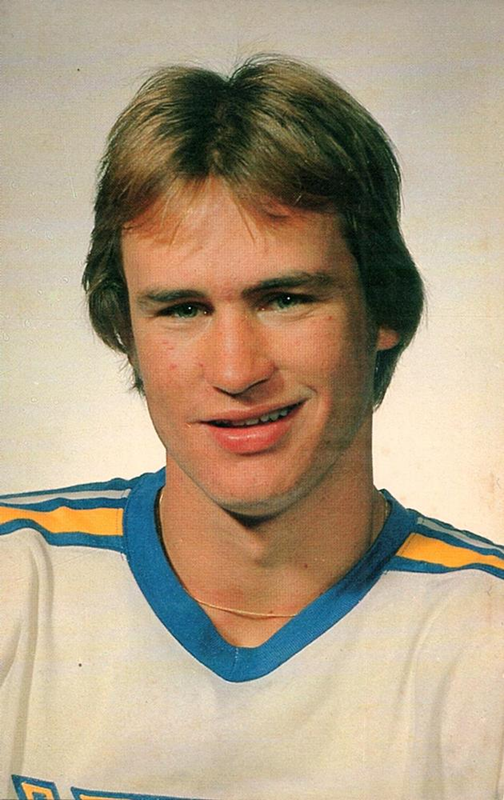
- Born: 7 July 1955 (age 71) Moose Jaw, Saskatchewan, Canada
- Height: 5 ft 9 in (175 cm)
- Weight: 170 lb (77 kg; 12 st 2 lb)
- Position: Goaltender
- Caught: Left
- Played for: St. Louis Blues; Winnipeg Jets; Hartford Whalers
- NHL draft: 27th overall, 1975; St. Louis Blues
- WHA draft: 35th overall, 1975; Cleveland Crusaders
- Playing career: 1975–1985

Edward Emile Staniowski (/stəˈnaʊskiː/ stə-NOW-skee; born July 7, 1955) is a Canadian former professional ice hockey goaltender who played for the St. Louis Blues, Winnipeg Jets and Hartford Whalers in the National Hockey League. He won the Charlie Conacher Humanitarian Award in 1978-79.

He played 219 games in his NHL career between 1975 and 1985, winning 67, losing 104 and tying 21. He was a Western Canada Hockey League First Team All-Star in 1975 while playing with the Regina Pats, and was named the inaugural recipient of the CHL Player of the Year Award.

== Military career ==
Ed Staniowski served in the Canadian Forces after retiring from hockey, reaching the rank of lieutenant colonel in the primary reserve. His military career has included "numerous" deployments, including as senior Canadian advisor to the Armed Forces of Sierra Leone.

== Career statistics ==
=== Regular season and playoffs ===
			Regular season									Playoffs
Season	Team	League	GP	W	L	T	MIN	GA	SO	GAA	SV%	GP	W	L	MIN	GA	SO	GAA	SV%
1970–71	Moose Jaw Canucks	SJHL	—	—	—	—	—	—	—	—	—	—	—	—	—	—	—	—	—
1971–72	Regina Blues	SJHL	—	—	—	—	—	—	—	—	—	—	—	—	—	—	—	—	—
1971–72	Regina Pats	WCHL	15	—	—	—	777	41	2	3.17	—	1	—	—	60	6	0	6.00	—
1972–73	Regina Pats	WCHL	64	—	—	—	3768	236	0	3.76	—	4	—	—	240	17	0	4.25	—
1973–74	Regina Pats	WCHL	62	39	12	9	3629	185	2	3.06	.900	16	—	—	965	47	1	2.92	—
1973–74	Regina Pats	M-Cup	—	—	—	—	—	—	—	—	—	3	2	1	180	9	1	3.00	—
1974–75	Regina Pats	WCHL	65	—	—	—	3898	255	2	3.95	.886	11	—	—	673	39	0	3.48	—
1975–76	St. Louis Blues	NHL	11	5	3	2	619	33	0	3.20	.902	3	1	2	206	7	0	2.04	.946
1975–76	Providence Reds	AHL	29	15	11	1	1709	108	0	3.79	—	—	—	—	—	—	—	—	—
1976–77	St. Louis Blues	NHL	29	10	16	1	1583	108	0	4.09	.866	3	0	2	101	9	0	5.36	.855
1976–77	Kansas City Blues	CHL	17	8	9	0	1008	59	2	3.51	.873	—	—	—	—	—	—	—	—
1977–78	St. Louis Blues	NHL	17	1	10	2	884	57	0	3.87	.856	—	—	—	—	—	—	—	—
1977–78	Salt Lake Golden Eagles	CHL	31	18	13	0	1805	96	0	3.19	.877	6	2	4	402	22	0	3.28	—
1978–79	St. Louis Blues	NHL	39	9	25	3	2286	146	0	3.83	.875	—	—	—	—	—	—	—	—
1978–79	Salt Lake Golden Eagles	CHL	5	2	2	1	309	10	2	1.94	.913	—	—	—	—	—	—	—	—
1979–80	St. Louis Blues	NHL	22	2	11	3	1106	80	0	4.34	.861	—	—	—	—	—	—	—	—
1979–80	Salt Lake Golden Eagles	CHL	4	3	1	0	239	6	0	1.51	.940	—	—	—	—	—	—	—	—
1980–81	St. Louis Blues	NHL	19	10	3	3	1010	72	0	4.28	.871	—	—	—	—	—	—	—	—
1981–82	Winnipeg Jets	NHL	45	20	19	6	2637	174	1	3.96	.876	2	0	2	119	12	0	6.05	.714
1982–83	Winnipeg Jets	NHL	17	4	8	0	825	65	1	4.73	.843	—	—	—	—	—	—	—	—
1982–83	Sherbrooke Jets	AHL	10	1	7	0	573	48	0	5.03	—	—	—	—	—	—	—	—	—
1983–84	Winnipeg Jets	NHL	1	0	0	0	40	8	0	12.00	.600	—	—	—	—	—	—	—	—
1983–84	Hartford Whalers	NHL	18	6	9	1	1039	74	0	4.27	.868	—	—	—	—	—	—	—	—
1984–85	Hartford Whalers	NHL	1	0	0	0	20	1	0	3.00	.900	—	—	—	—	—	—	—	—
1984–85	Binghamton Whalers	AHL	10	4	4	2	612	44	0	4.31	.829	—	—	—	—	—	—	—	—
1984–85	Salt Lake Golden Eagles	IHL	9	4	5	0	538	33	0	3.68	—	5	1	4	265	17	0	3.85	—
NHL totals			219	67	104	21	12,050	818	2	4.07	.869	8	1	6	426	28	0	3.94	.880

=== International ===
Year	Team	Event	GP	W	L	T	MIN	GA	SO	GAA	SV%
1975	Canada	WJC	2	2	0	0	120	3	0	1.50
1979	Canada	WC	3	1	1	0	160	19	0	7.12	.756

== Awards ==
- WCHL All-Star Team – 1975

Preceded by Inaugural	CHL Player of the Year; 1975	Succeeded by Peter Lee
Preceded by Yves Belanger and Gord McRae	Winner of the Terry Sawchuk Trophy with Doug Grant; 1977–78	Succeeded by Doug Grant and Terry Richardson
