= Paul Harrison (ice hockey) =

Canadian ice hockey player

- Born: February 11, 1955 (age 71) Timmins, Ontario, Canada
- Height: 6 ft 1 in (185 cm)
- Weight: 196 lb (89 kg; 14 st 0 lb)
- Position: Goaltender
- Caught: Right
- Played for: Minnesota North Stars; Toronto Maple Leafs; Pittsburgh Penguins; Buffalo Sabres
- NHL draft: 40th overall, 1975; Minnesota North Stars
- WHA draft: 61st overall, 1975; Cincinnati Stingers
- Playing career: 1975–1983

Paul Douglas Harrison (born February 11, 1955) is a Canadian former professional ice hockey goaltender. He played in the National Hockey League (NHL) with the Minnesota North Stars, Toronto Maple Leafs, Pittsburgh Penguins, and Buffalo Sabres between 1975 and 1982, accumulating a record of 28-59–9.

== Career ==
Harrison was drafted in the third round, 40th overall, by the Minnesota North Stars in the 1975 NHL Amateur Draft. He was also drafted by the World Hockey Association's Cincinnati Stingers, but never played in that league.

After his NHL career finished, Harrison moved back to Timmins and became a police officer for the Ontario Provincial Police. He taught grade-school students about drug awareness through the D.A.R.E. Program.

== Personal life ==
Harrison and his wife Penny had two daughters, and they lived in Timmins.

== Career statistics ==
=== Regular season and playoffs ===
			Regular season									Playoffs
Season	Team	League	GP	W	L	T	MIN	GA	SO	GAA	SV%	GP	W	L	MIN	GA	SO	GAA	SV%
1973–74	Oshawa Generals	OHA	33	—	—	—	1968	131	1	3.99	—	—	—	—	—	—	—	—	—
1974–75	Oshawa Generals	OMJHL	34	—	—	—	2040	153	2	4.50	—	4	—	—	240	17	0	4.25	—
1975–76	Minnesota North Stars	NHL	6	0	4	1	307	28	0	5.48	.836	—	—	—	—	—	—	—	—
1975–76	Providence Reds	AHL	3	1	1	1	145	13	0	5.38	—	—	—	—	—	—	—	—	—
1976–77	Minnesota North Stars	NHL	2	0	2	0	120	11	0	5.50	.776	—	—	—	—	—	—	—	—
1976–77	New Haven Nighthawks	AHL	55	32	17	6	3265	172	2	3.16	.898	6	2	4	363	25	0	4.13	—
1977–78	Minnesota North Stars	NHL	27	6	16	2	1551	99	1	3.83	.876	—	—	—	—	—	—	—	—
1978–79	Toronto Maple Leafs	NHL	25	8	12	3	1401	82	1	3.51	.879	2	0	1	87	7	0	4.83	.860
1979–80	Toronto Maple Leafs	NHL	30	9	17	2	1485	110	0	4.45	.871	—	—	—	—	—	—	—	—
1979–80	New Brunswick Hawks	AHL	9	4	3	1	485	30	0	3.71	.878	—	—	—	—	—	—	—	—
1980–81	Dallas Black Hawks	CHL	37	24	7	2	2047	92	4	2.70	.889	—	—	—	—	—	—	—	—
1980–81	Toronto Maple Leafs	NHL	—	—	—	—	—	—	—	—	—	1	0	0	40	1	0	1.50	.941
1981–82	Pittsburgh Penguins	NHL	13	3	7	0	698	64	0	5.51	.819	—	—	—	—	—	—	—	—
1981–82	Buffalo Sabres	NHL	6	2	1	1	230	14	0	3.67	.844	1	0	0	26	1	0	2.35	.875
1982–83	Rochester Americans	AHL	29	11	11	3	1535	110	0	4.30	.850	3	0	0	26	0	0	0.00	1.000
NHL totals			109	28	59	9	5789	408	2	4.23	.864	4	0	1	153	9	0	3.54	.880

Preceded by Richard Brodeur and Jim Park	Winner of the Terry Sawchuk Trophy with Ken Ellacott; 1980–81	Succeeded by Kelly Hrudey and Robert Holland
