= Gary Inness =

Canadian ice hockey player and teacher (1949–2021)

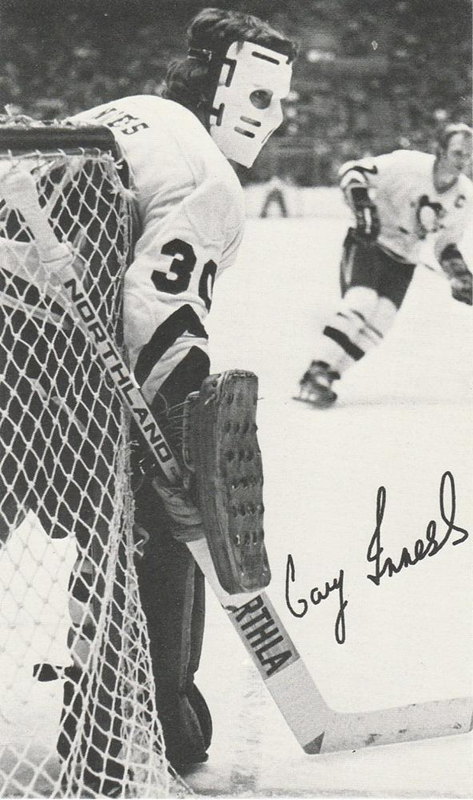
- Born: May 28, 1949 Toronto, Ontario, Canada
- Died: February 23, 2021 (aged 71) Barrie, Ontario, Canada
- Height: 6 ft 0 in (183 cm)
- Weight: 195 lb (88 kg; 13 st 13 lb)
- Position: Goaltender
- Caught: Left
- Played for: Pittsburgh Penguins; Philadelphia Flyers; Indianapolis Racers; Washington Capitals
- NHL draft: Undrafted
- Playing career: 1973–1981

Gary George Inness (May 28, 1949 – February 23, 2021) was a Canadian professional ice hockey goaltender and teacher. He played 162 games in the National Hockey League with the Pittsburgh Penguins, Philadelphia Flyers, and Washington Capitals between 1973 and 1981, and 63 games in the World Hockey Association with the Indianapolis Racers from 1977 to 1978.

== Playing career ==
Gary Inness took an unusual route to the NHL. After playing Junior B with the Weston Dodgers, Inness then went to McMaster University in Ontario for 4 years, playing both football as a centre and hockey for his university team. Inness then played one year with the University of Toronto, winning the CIAU championship while completing his teacher's certificate.

Inness never had aspirations of playing in the National Hockey League (NHL), instead thinking he would be a teacher in Ontario. However, the Pittsburgh Penguins invited him to training camp, and Inness signed as a free agent with them in 1973. Inness played for parts of almost three seasons in Pittsburgh before he was traded to the Philadelphia Flyers. After his stint with the Flyers, he played for two seasons in the World Hockey Association (WHA) with the Indianapolis Racers, playing with a 17-year-old Wayne Gretzky. When the Racers folded in December 1978, he returned to the NHL by signing with the Washington Capitals, with whom he played for parts of three seasons before retiring at the end of the 1980–81 NHL season.

Upon retiring from NHL play, Inness happened to be in Hershey, Pennsylvania, when Hershey Bears coach Bryan Murray was promoted to coach the parent Washington Capitals. Being in the right place at the right time, Inness was hired to coach the Bears until being replaced midway through the 1984-85 AHL season.

== Post-hockey career ==
Inness worked as a teacher and then a guidance counselor at Barrie North Collegiate Institute up until early 2010, after which he retired. He was well known for his involvement with coaching in the school and remained an important part of its history. He died on February 23, 2021, from complications of dementia.

== Career statistics ==
=== Regular season and playoffs ===
			Regular season									Playoffs
Season	Team	League	GP	W	L	T	MIN	GA	SO	GAA	SV%	GP	W	L	MIN	GA	SO	GAA	SV%
1970–71	McMaster University	CIAU	16	—	—	—	888	70	0	4.73	—	—	—	—	—	—	—	—	—
1971–72	McMaster University	CIAU	18	—	—	—	1060	59	0	3.44	—	—	—	—	—	—	—	—	—
1972–73	University of Toronto	CIAU	9	—	—	—	540	24	0	2.67	—	—	—	—	—	—	—	—	—
1973–74	Pittsburgh Penguins	NHL	20	7	10	1	1031	56	0	3.26	.885	—	—	—	—	—	—	—	—
1973–74	Hershey Bears	AHL	20	11	4	4	1160	56	1	2.89	—	—	—	—	—	—	—	—	—
1974–75	Pittsburgh Penguins	NHL	57	24	18	10	3116	161	2	3.10	.905	9	5	4	537	24	0	2.68	.919
1975–76	Pittsburgh Penguins	NHL	23	8	9	2	1208	82	0	4.07	.881	—	—	—	—	—	—	—	—
1975–76	Philadelphia Flyers	NHL	2	2	0	0	120	3	0	1.51	.950	—	—	—	—	—	—	—	—
1975–76	Hershey Bears	AHL	2	0	2	0	119	9	0	4.54	—	—	—	—	—	—	—	—	—
1976–77	Philadelphia Flyers	NHL	6	1	0	2	211	9	0	2.57	.899	—	—	—	—	—	—	—	—
1977–78	Indianapolis Racers	WHA	52	14	30	4	2850	200	0	4.21	.870	—	—	—	—	—	—	—	—
1978–79	Indianapolis Racers	WHA	11	3	6	0	609	51	0	5.02	.862	—	—	—	—	—	—	—	—
1978–79	Washington Capitals	NHL	37	14	14	8	2103	130	0	3.71	.880	—	—	—	—	—	—	—	—
1979–80	Washington Capitals	NHL	14	2	9	2	725	44	0	3.64	.874	—	—	—	—	—	—	—	—
1979–80	Hershey Bears	AHL	11	4	4	3	673	44	0	3.92	—	8	7	1	531	25	0	2.82	—
1980–81	Washington Capitals	NHL	3	0	1	2	180	9	0	3.02	.917	—	—	—	—	—	—	—	—
1980–81	Hershey Bears	AHL	10	4	2	2	529	31	1	3.52	—	4	0	3	198	12	0	3.64	—
WHA totals			63	17	36	4	3459	251	0	4.35	.869	—	—	—	—	—	—	—	—
NHL totals			162	58	61	27	8690	494	2	3.41	.892	9	5	4	537	24	0	2.68	.919
