= Gord McRae =

Canadian ice hockey player

- Born: April 12, 1948 (age 76); Sherbrooke, Quebec, Canada
- Height: 6 ft 2 in (188 cm)
- Weight: 180 lb (82 kg; 12 st 12 lb)
- Position: Goaltender
- Caught: Left
- Played for: Toronto Maple Leafs
- NHL draft: Undrafted
- Playing career: 1970–1978

Gordon Alexander McRae (born April 12, 1948) is a Canadian retired professional hockey goaltender. He played in 71 regular season and 8 playoff games for the Toronto Maple Leafs of the National Hockey League from 1972 to 1978.

== Playing career ==
After a three-year college career with the Michigan Tech Huskies, McRae played with Charlotte of the Eastern Hockey League and Providence in the American Hockey League before joining the Tulsa Oilers of the Central Hockey League in 1971. Signed by Toronto, he first appeared with the Leafs in 11 games during the 1972–73 season. He spent the next few years bouncing between the NHL club and its minor league affiliates in the CHL. His best season was 1974–75 when he appeared in 20 games, posting a 10–3–6 record with a 3.29 GAA. He backstopped the team to a first-round playoff upset over the Los Angeles Kings that season. McRae's final seasons were either as a back-up with the Leafs or in the Central League before retiring after the 1977–78 season. While with the Dallas Black Hawks of the CHL in 1976–77, he won the Terry Sawchuk trophy and was named to the CHL's first All-Star team.

== Career statistics ==
=== Regular season and playoffs ===
			Regular season									Playoffs
Season	Team	League	GP	W	L	T	MIN	GA	SO	GAA	SV%	GP	W	L	MIN	GA	SO	GAA	SV%
1964–65	Rouyn-Noranda Citadelles	QNWJHL	6	—	—	—	—	—	—	2.68	—	—	—	—	—	—	—	—	—
1965–66	Rouyn-Noranda Citadelles	QNWJHL	21	—	—	—	—	—	—	3.14	—	—	—	—	—	—	—	—	—
1967–68	Michigan Technological University	WCHA	12	—	—	—	720	25	2	2.08	.926	—	—	—	—	—	—	—	—
1968–69	Michigan Technological University	WCHA	28	—	—	—	1680	84	1	3.00	.897	—	—	—	—	—	—	—	—
1969–70	Michigan Technological University	WCHA	31	—	—	—	1860	112	1	3.61	.885	—	—	—	—	—	—	—	—
1970–71	Jacksonville Rockets	EHL	—	—	—	—	—	—	—	—	—	—	—	—	—	—	—	—	—
1970–71	Jersey Devils	EHL	—	—	—	—	—	—	—	—	—	—	—	—	—	—	—	—	—
1970–71	Charlotte Checkers	EHL	—	—	—	—	—	—	—	—	—	7	7	0	420	8	3	1.14	—
1971–72	Orillia Terriers	OHA Sr	2	—	—	—	120	11	0	5.50	—	—	—	—	—	—	—	—	—
1971–72	Providence Reds	AHL	3	2	1	0	140	8	0	3.42	—	—	—	—	—	—	—	—	—
1971–72	Tulsa Oilers	CHL	17	5	5	6	879	54	0	3.68	—	7	3	4	372	28	0	4.51	—
1972–73	Toronto Maple Leafs	NHL	11	7	3	0	620	39	0	3.77	.892	—	—	—	—	—	—	—	—
1972–73	Tulsa Oilers	CHL	43	18	19	6	2459	154	3	3.75	—	—	—	—	—	—	—	—	—
1973–74	Oklahoma City Blazers	CHL	39	20	14	4	2222	119	2	3.21	—	8	—	—	460	17	1	2.21	—
1974–75	Toronto Maple Leafs	NHL	20	10	3	6	1063	57	0	3.22	.891	7	2	5	441	21	0	2.86	.900
1974–75	Oklahoma City Blazers	CHL	29	4	16	4	1483	99	0	4.01	—	—	—	—	—	—	—	—	—
1975–76	Toronto Maple Leafs	NHL	20	6	5	2	954	59	0	3.71	.875	1	0	0	13	1	0	4.76	.800
1976–77	Toronto Maple Leafs	NHL	2	0	1	1	120	9	0	4.53	.882	—	—	—	—	—	—	—	—
1976–77	Dallas Black Hawks	CHL	30	17	6	7	1796	81	1	2.71	—	3	1	2	179	10	0	3.35	—
1977–78	Toronto Maple Leafs	NHL	18	7	10	1	1037	57	1	3.30	.882	—	—	—	—	—	—	—	—
NHL totals			71	30	22	10	3793	221	1	3.50	.885	8	2	5	454	22	0	2.91	.898

Preceded by Inaugural	Winner of the Terry Sawchuk Trophy shared with Yves Belanger; 1976–77	Succeeded by Doug Grant and Ed Staniowski
