= Ken Ellacott =

Canadian ice hockey player

- Born: March 3, 1959 (age 67) Paris, Ontario, Canada
- Height: 5 ft 8 in (173 cm)
- Weight: 160 lb (73 kg; 11 st 6 lb)
- Position: Goaltender
- Caught: Left
- Played for: Vancouver Canucks
- NHL draft: 47th overall, 1979; Vancouver Canucks
- Playing career: 1979–1984

Kenneth George Ellacott (born March 3, 1959) is a Canadian former professional ice hockey goaltender. Ellacott played in the National Hockey League (NHL) for the Vancouver Canucks in 1982–83. He played 12 games in the NHL, spending most of his professional career in the minor professional Central Hockey League with the Dallas Black Hawks and Montana Magic. Ellacott also played briefly for the Fredericton Express of the American Hockey League. His junior career was spent with the Peterborough Petes of the Ontario Hockey League.

== Career statistics ==
=== Regular season and playoffs ===
			Regular season									Playoffs
Season	Team	League	GP	W	L	T	MIN	GA	SO	GAA	SV%	GP	W	L	T	MIN	GA	SO	GAA	SV%
1976–77	Hespeler Shamrocks	ON-Jr. B	41	—	—	—	2460	216	0	5.27	—	—	—	—	—	—	—	—	—	—
1977–78	Peterborough Petes	OMJHL	55	—	—	—	3270	200	0	3.65	—	21	11	6	4	1260	74	1	3.42	—
1978–79	Peterborough Petes	OMJHL	48	—	—	—	2856	169	3	3.53	—	19	—	—	—	1140	61	1	3.21	—
1979–80	Dallas Black Hawks	CHL	54	19	28	5	3155	198	4	3.77	—	—	—	—	—	—	—	—	—	—
1980–81	Dallas Black Hawks	CHL	40	27	7	5	2336	119	1	3.06	—	—	—	—	—	—	—	—	—	—
1981–82	Dallas Black Hawks	CHL	68	31	25	5	3742	282	1	4.52	—	—	—	—	—	—	—	—	—	—
1982–83	Vancouver Canucks	NHL	12	2	3	4	551	41	0	4.47	.867	—	—	—	—	—	—	—	—	—
1982–83	Fredericton Express	AHL	17	11	6	0	998	63	0	3.79	—	—	—	—	—	—	—	—	—	—
1983–84	Montana Magic	CHL	41	—	—	—	2441	208	1	5.11	—	—	—	—	—	—	—	—	—	—
NHL totals			12	2	3	4	551	41	0	4.47	.867	—	—	—	—	—	—	—	—	—

Preceded by Richard Brodeur and Jim Park	Winner of the Terry Sawchuk Trophy with Paul Harrison; 1980–81	Succeeded by Kelly Hrudey and Robert Holland
