= Ronald Ullyot =

Canadian ice hockey player and coach

- Born: April 21, 1946 (age 80) Saskatoon, Saskatchewan, Canada
- Height: 6 ft 0 in (183 cm)
- Weight: 170 lb (77 kg; 12 st 2 lb)
- Position: Centre
- Shot: Right
- Played for: Fort Wayne Komets (IHL)
- Playing career: 1968–1975

Ronald Ullyot (born April 21, 1946) is a Canadian former professional ice hockey player and coach.

Ullyot played seven seasons with the Fort Wayne Komets of the International Hockey League (IHL), retiring as a player after the 1974–75 season with career totals of 121 goals, 123 assists, 244 points, and 279 penalty minutes in 448 regular season games played. He also played in 28 playoff contests with the Komets. Ullyot began his head coaching career in the IHL with the 1976–77 Columbus Owls. He would also serve as head coach for the Port Huron Flags, Fort Worth Texans of the Central Hockey League, the Fort Wayne Komets and the Indianapolis Checkers of the IHL before retiring from hockey following the 1986–87 IHL season. Ron resides in Florida with his family, outside of Orlando, and is active as a coach and referee in the local youth hockey.

== Family ==
His father Ken Ullyot was the long-time coach and general manager of the Fort Wayne Komets.
