= Denver Rangers =

American professional hockey team

The Denver Rangers were a professional hockey team based in Denver, Colorado that played for two seasons in the late 1980s. They were a member of the International Hockey League, and an affiliate of the New York Rangers. The team was originally known as the Indianapolis Checkers, but after the 1986–1987 season the team moved to Denver. The team was originally known as the Colorado Rangers for the 1987–1988 season. After the 1988–1989 season the team moved to Phoenix, Arizona and became known as the Phoenix Roadrunners.

== Standings ==
Year	GP	W	L	T	OTL	PTS	GF	GA	Pct	Standings
1987–1988	82	44	35	0	3	91	344	354	.555	5 of 9
1988–1989	82	33	42	0	7	73	323	394	.445	7 of 10
Totals	164	77	77	0	10	-	667	748	.500	

== Notable NHL alumni ==
List of Denver Rangers alumni who played more than 100 games in Denver and 100 or more games in the National Hockey League.

- Todd Elik
- Mike Richter
