= 1974–75 NHL season =

National Hockey League season

- League: National Hockey League
- Sport: Ice hockey
- Duration: October 9, 1974 – May 27, 1975
- Games: 80
- Teams: 18
- TV partner(s): CBC, CTV, SRC (Canada); NBC (United States)

Draft
- Top draft pick: Greg Joly
- Picked by: Washington Capitals

Regular season
- Season champions: Philadelphia Flyers
- Season MVP: Bobby Clarke (Flyers)
- Top scorer: Bobby Orr (Bruins)

Playoffs
- Playoffs MVP: Bernie Parent (Flyers)

Stanley Cup
- Champions: Philadelphia Flyers
- Runners-up: Buffalo Sabres

NHL seasons
- 1973–74 1975–76

The 1974–75 NHL season was the 58th season of the National Hockey League. Two new teams, the Washington Capitals and Kansas City Scouts, were added, increasing the number of teams to 18. To accommodate the new teams, the NHL re-organized its divisional structure and playoff format. The regular season was expanded to 80 games per team (which would be the case until 1992–93). The Philadelphia Flyers won the Stanley Cup for the second consecutive year.

== League business ==
=== Expansion and realignment ===
The Washington Capitals and Kansas City Scouts were added as expansion teams. The 1974 NHL expansion draft was held on June 12 to fill the rosters of the two new teams.

With the number of teams increased to 18, the NHL bumped up the number of regular season games from 78 to 80, and split the previously two-division league into two conferences with four divisions. Because the new conferences and divisions had little to do with North American geography, geographical references were removed until 1993–94. The East Division became the Prince of Wales Conference and consisted of the Adams Division and Norris Division. The West Division became the Clarence Campbell Conference and consisted of the Patrick Division and Smythe Division. The Capitals had the worst season ever recorded in the history of major professional hockey, and the third worst in the postwar era the following season, while the Scouts the following season will have the fifth worst record of the postwar era. The Clarence S. Campbell Bowl and Prince of Wales Trophy (previously awarded to the first-place finishers of the West Division and East Division respectively) now became awarded to the first-place finishers of the Campbell Conference and the Wales Conference, respectively. With the 14 teams playing concurrently in the rival World Hockey Association in that same season, there were 32 combined professional hockey teams playing in North America.

=== Cancelled relocation ===
In early 1975, newspapers reported that the California Golden Seals and Pittsburgh Penguins were to be relocated to Denver and Seattle respectively, in an arrangement that would have seen the two teams sold to groups in those cities that had already been awarded "conditional" franchises for the 1976–77 season. After staunchly rejecting previous franchise relocation attempts, league president Clarence Campbell saw this as a method by which the NHL might extricate itself from two problem markets, while honoring the expansion commitments it had made. The Penguins ended up staying in Pittsburgh (and ultimately, over time, made Pittsburgh one of the NHL's stronger markets), while the Golden Seals moved to Cleveland in 1976 to become the Cleveland Barons before merging with the Minnesota North Stars in 1978. The Scouts gave up on Kansas City after two seasons and moved to Denver to become the Colorado Rockies in 1976 before moving east to East Rutherford, New Jersey, in 1982 and becoming the New Jersey Devils; Denver returned to the NHL in 1995 when the Quebec Nordiques moved there and became the Colorado Avalanche, where they remain to this day. Seattle was later awarded an expansion team, the Seattle Kraken, in 2018 that began play in 2021.

=== Amateur draft ===
The 1974 NHL amateur draft was held on May 28–30. For the first time, the draft was held at the NHL offices in Montreal, Quebec. Greg Joly was selected first overall by the Washington Capitals.

== Arena changes ==
- The expansion Kansas City Scouts moved into Kemper Arena.
- The expansion Washington Capitals moved into the Capital Centre in Landover, Maryland.

== Regular season ==
For the first time ever in the National Hockey League, there was a three-way tie for first place overall. The respective divisional leaders of the Norris (Montreal Canadiens), Patrick (Philadelphia Flyers), and Adams (Buffalo Sabres) all had 113 points. By virtue of having the most wins, the Flyers were accorded the league's best record and held home-ice advantage in the playoffs, where they eventually met the Sabres in the Stanley Cup Final.

The Vancouver Canucks, which had been playing in the original East Division since they debuted in the league, were moved over to the Campbell Conference and led the way in the Smythe Division with a meager 86 points.

Bobby Orr won the scoring title for the second time, the only defenceman in the history of the NHL to accomplish this feat.

The surprise team of the year were the Los Angeles Kings. The Kings, with their disciplined defensive style, and excellent goaltending tandem of Rogie Vachon and Gary Edwards, battled Montreal all year for first place. The Kings opened their season by beating the defending champion Philadelphia Flyers in Philadelphia and tying the Canadiens in Montreal. The Kings lost only twice in their first 26 games, and on Christmas, Montreal had only a two-point lead in the standings. When L.A. won in Montreal in mid-January, they were back in first place. The teams continued to battle, with the Canadiens finally clinching first place with three games to play.

=== Final standings ===
Note: GP = Games played, W = Wins, L = Losses, T = Ties, Pts = Points, GF = Goals for, GA = Goals against
Note: Teams that qualified for the playoffs are highlighted in bold

==== Prince of Wales Conference ====
Adams Division
		GP	W	L	T	GF	GA	DIFF	Pts
**1**	**Buffalo Sabres**	**80**	**49**	**16**	**15**	**354**	**240**	**+114**	**113**
**2**	**Boston Bruins**	**80**	**40**	**26**	**14**	**345**	**245**	**+100**	**94**
**3**	**Toronto Maple Leafs**	**80**	**31**	**33**	**16**	**280**	**309**	**−29**	**78**
4	California Golden Seals	80	19	48	13	212	316	−104	51

Norris Division
		GP	W	L	T	GF	GA	DIFF	Pts
**1**	**Montreal Canadiens**	**80**	**47**	**14**	**19**	**374**	**225**	**+149**	**113**
**2**	**Los Angeles Kings**	**80**	**42**	**17**	**21**	**269**	**185**	**+84**	**105**
**3**	**Pittsburgh Penguins**	**80**	**37**	**28**	**15**	**326**	**289**	**+37**	**89**
4	Detroit Red Wings	80	23	45	12	259	335	−76	58
5	Washington Capitals	80	8	67	5	181	446	−265	21

==== Clarence Campbell Conference ====
Patrick Division
		GP	W	L	T	GF	GA	DIFF	Pts
**1**	**Philadelphia Flyers**	**80**	**51**	**18**	**11**	**293**	**181**	**+112**	**113**
**2**	**New York Rangers**	**80**	**37**	**29**	**14**	**319**	**276**	**+43**	**88**
**3**	**New York Islanders**	**80**	**33**	**25**	**22**	**264**	**221**	**+43**	**88**
4	Atlanta Flames	80	34	31	15	243	233	+10	83

Smythe Division
		GP	W	L	T	GF	GA	DIFF	Pts
**1**	**Vancouver Canucks**	**80**	**38**	**32**	**10**	**271**	**254**	**+17**	**86**
**2**	**St. Louis Blues**	**80**	**35**	**31**	**14**	**269**	**267**	**+2**	**84**
**3**	**Chicago Blackhawks**	**80**	**37**	**35**	**8**	**268**	**241**	**+27**	**82**
4	Minnesota North Stars	80	23	50	7	221	341	−120	53
5	Kansas City Scouts	80	15	54	11	184	328	−144	41

== Playoffs ==
=== Playoff seeds ===
With the new conference and division structure, a new postseason format was also introduced. The top three teams in each division made the playoffs. All 12 clubs then were seeded 1–12 based on regular season points, regardless of conference or division.

Note: Only teams that qualified for the playoffs are listed here.

1. Philadelphia Flyers, Patrick Division champions, Clarence Campbell Conference regular season champions – 113 points (51 wins)
2. Buffalo Sabres, Adams Division champions, Prince of Wales Conference regular season champions – 113 points (49 wins)
3. Montreal Canadiens, Norris Division champions – 113 points (47 wins)
4. Los Angeles Kings – 105 points
5. Boston Bruins – 94 points
6. Pittsburgh Penguins – 89 points
7. New York Rangers – 88 points (37 wins)
8. New York Islanders – 88 points (33 wins)
9. Vancouver Canucks, Smythe Division champions – 86 points
10. St. Louis Blues – 84 points
11. Chicago Black Hawks – 82 points
12. Toronto Maple Leafs – 78 points

=== Playoff bracket ===
Under the new postseason format, the NHL began using "re-seeding" instead of a fixed bracket playoff system: in each round, the highest remaining seed was matched against the lowest remaining seed, the second-highest remaining seed played the second-lowest remaining seed, and so forth.

Regardless of playoff seed, all four division winners received a bye to the quarterfinals, including this season's 9th overall seeded Smythe Division champion Vancouver Canucks.

Each series in the preliminary round was played in a best-of-three format while each series in the other three rounds were played in a best-of-seven format (scores in the bracket indicate the number of games won in each series).

Preliminary round
1	Los Angeles	1
8	Toronto	2
3	Pittsburgh	2
6	St. Louis	0
4	NY Rangers	1
5	NY Islanders	2
2	Boston	1
7	Chicago	2

Quarterfinals
1	Philadelphia	4
8	Toronto	0
4	Pittsburgh	3
5	NY Islanders	4
2	Buffalo	4
7	Chicago	1
3	Montreal	4
6	Vancouver	1

Semifinals
1	Philadelphia	4
4	NY Islanders	3
2	Buffalo	4
3	Montreal	2

Stanley Cup Final
1	Philadelphia	4
2	Buffalo	2

=== Preliminary round ===
==== (1) Los Angeles Kings vs. (8) Toronto Maple Leafs ====
The Los Angeles Kings entered the preliminary round as the top seed (and fourth seed overall) earning 105 points during the regular season. The Toronto Maple Leafs earned 78 points during the regular season and entered the preliminary round as the eighth seed (and twelfth seed overall). This was the first playoff series between these two teams. Los Angeles won this year's season series earning 9 of 10 points during the regular season.

April 8	Toronto Maple Leafs	2–3	OT	Los Angeles Kings	The Forum	Recap
Blaine Stoughton (1) – 15:40		First period		14:31 – Bob Berry (1)
No scoring		Second period		16:25 – Gene Carr (1)
Ron Ellis (1) – 18:30		Third period		No scoring
No scoring		First overtime period		08:53 – Mike Murphy (1)
Gord McRae 29 saves / 32 shots		Goalie stats		Rogie Vachon 28 saves / 30 shots

April 10	Los Angeles Kings	2–3	OT	Toronto Maple Leafs	Maple Leaf Gardens	Recap
No scoring		First period		10:25 – Darryl Sittler (1)
Mike Murphy (2) – pp – 10:45		Second period		No scoring
Mike Murphy (3) – pp – 04:05		Third period		08:45 – Dave Dunn (1)
No scoring		First overtime period		10:19 – Blaine Stoughton (2)
Rogie Vachon 43 saves / 46 shots		Goalie stats		Gord McRae 39 saves / 41 shots

April 11	Toronto Maple Leafs	2–1	Los Angeles Kings	The Forum	Recap
George Ferguson (1) – 04:55		First period	No scoring
Inge Hammarstrom (1) – 14:34		Second period	No scoring
No scoring		Third period	13:09 – Don Kozak (1)
Gord McRae 21 saves / 22 shots		Goalie stats	Rogie Vachon 21 saves / 23 shots

Toronto won series 2–1

==== (2) Boston Bruins vs. (7) Chicago Black Hawks ====
The Boston Bruins entered the preliminary round as the second seed (and fifth seed overall) earning 94 points during the regular season. The Chicago Black Hawks earned 82 points during the regular season and entered the preliminary round as the seventh seed (and eleventh seed overall). This was the fifth playoff series between these two teams, with Boston winning all four previous meetings. Thus was a rematch of last year's Stanley Cup semifinals where Boston won in six games. The teams split this year's regular season series.

April 8	Chicago Blackhawks	2–8	Boston Bruins	Boston Garden	Recap
No scoring		First period	08:38 – Johnny Bucyk (1); 15:03 – Carol Vadnais (1); 15:12 – Andre Savard (1)
No scoring		Second period	10:39 – Phil Esposito (1); 16:01 – Gregg Sheppard (1); 16:50 – Gregg Sheppard (2)
Dick Redmond (1) – pp – 04:20; John Marks (1) – 19:59		Third period	01:29 – pp – Phil Esposito (2); 11:03 – Phil Esposito (3)
Tony Esposito 25 saves / 32 shots Michel Dumas 8 saves / 9 shots		Goalie stats	Gilles Gilbert 28 saves / 30 shots

April 10	Boston Bruins	3–4	OT	Chicago Blackhawks	Chicago Stadium	Recap
No scoring		First period		03:15 – Ivan Boldirev (1); 14:37 – pp – Stan Mikita (1)
Don Marcotte (1) – 04:35; Ken Hodge (1) – pp – 13:32		Second period		15:39 – Dale Tallon (1)
Bobby Orr (1) – sh – 01:31		Third period		No scoring
No scoring		First overtime period		07:33 – Ivan Boldirev (2)
Gilles Gilbert 32 saves / 36 shots		Goalie stats		Tony Esposito 32 saves / 35 shots

April 11	Chicago Blackhawks	6–4	Boston Bruins	Boston Garden	Recap
Keith Magnuson (1) – 01:26; Cliff Koroll (1) – pp – 19:13		First period	No scoring
J.P. Bordeleau (1) – 02:27; Cliff Koroll (2) – pp – 15:34; John Marks (2) – 18:24		Second period	07:16 – Bobby Schmautz (1); 09:32 – Hank Nowak (1); 18:58 – Gregg Sheppard (3)
J.P. Bordeleau (2) – 11:27		Third period	15:55 – Phil Esposito (4)
Tony Esposito 52 saves / 56 shots		Goalie stats	Gilles Gilbert 13 saves / 19 shots

Chicago won series 2–1

==== (3) Pittsburgh Penguins vs. (6) St. Louis Blues ====
The Pittsburgh Penguins entered the preliminary round as the third seed (and sixth seed overall) earning 89 points during the regular season. The St. Louis Blues earned 84 points during the regular season and entered the preliminary round as the sixth seed (and tenth seed overall). This was the second playoff series between these two teams, with St. Louis winning the only previous meeting in six games in the 1970 Stanley Cup semifinals. The teams split this year's regular season series.

April 8	St. Louis Blues	3–4	Pittsburgh Penguins	Civic Arena	Recap
Claude Larose (1) – 12:21; Wayne Merrick (1) – pp – 17:19		First period	No scoring
No scoring		Second period	19:45 – Bob Kelly (1)
Garry Unger (1) – 00:54		Third period	03:45 – Chuck Arnason (1); 09:57 – pp – Chuck Arnason (2); 17:29 – Pierre Larouche (1)
John Davidson 22 saves / 26 shots		Goalie stats	Gary Inness 19 saves / 22 shots

April 10	Pittsburgh Penguins	5–3	St. Louis Blues	St. Louis Arena	Recap
Jean Pronovost (1) – 05:16; Ron Stackhouse (1) – pp – 17:56		First period	03:12 – pp – Red Berenson (1); 09:57 – Bill Collins (1)
Syl Apps Jr. (1) – pp – 14:47		Second period	11:26 – Larry Sacharuk (1)
Colin Campbell (1) – sh – 04:33; Vic Hadfield (1) – 16:12		Third period	No scoring
Gary Inness 39 saves / 42 shots		Goalie stats	Eddie Johnston 24 saves / 29 shots

Pittsburgh won series 2–0

==== (4) New York Rangers vs. (5) New York Islanders ====
Both the New York Rangers and the New York Islanders entered the preliminary round with 88 points earned during the regular season. However, the Rangers entered as the fourth seed (and seventh seed overall) by winning the tie-breaker with the New York Islanders in wins (37 to 33) while the Islanders entered the preliminary round as the fifth seed (and eighth seed overall). This was the first playoff series between these two teams. The Rangers won this year's season series earning 7 of 12 points during the regular season. J.P Parise scored the game-winning goal just 11 seconds into overtime of game 3 as the Islanders won their first playoff series ever.

April 8	New York Islanders	3–2	New York Rangers	Madison Square Garden	Recap
No scoring		First period	No scoring
No scoring		Second period	08:11 – Brad Park (1); 19:25 – Pete Stemkowski (1)
Billy Harris (1) – pp – 05:00; Jean Potvin (1) – 11:51; Clark Gillies (1) – 13:30		Third period	No scoring
Chico Resch 29 saves / 31 shots		Goalie stats	Eddie Giacomin 22 saves / 25 shots

April 10	New York Rangers	8–3	New York Islanders	Nassau Coliseum	Recap
Jean Ratelle (1) – pp – 03:29; Bill Fairbairn (1) – pp – 06:10; Bill Fairbairn (2) – sh – 07:01; Ron Harris (1) – 10:56		First period	08:29 – pp – J.P. Parise (1)
Steve Vickers (1) – 02:20; Jerry Butler (1) – 09:58; Walt Tkaczuk (1) – 17:51		Second period	17:15 – Bert Marshall (1)
Rod Gilbert (1) – 02:37		Third period	05:34 – Jean Potvin (2)
Gilles Villemure 24 saves / 27 shots		Goalie stats	Chico Resch 8 saves / 14 shots Billy Smith 15 saves / 17 shots

April 11	New York Islanders	4–3	OT	New York Rangers	Madison Square Garden	Recap
Clark Gillies (2) – 16:00		First period		No scoring
Denis Potvin (1) – pp – 08:26; Denis Potvin (2) – sh – 12:51		Second period		No scoring
No scoring		Third period		04:44 – Bill Fairbairn (3); 13:27 – pp – Bill Fairbairn (4); 13:42 – Steve Vickers (2)
J.P. Parise (2) – 00:11		First overtime period		No scoring
Billy Smith 37 saves / 40 shots		Goalie stats		Gilles Villemure 17 saves / 20 shots Eddie Giacomin 4 saves / 5 shots

New York Islanders won series 2–1

=== Quarterfinals ===
==== (1) Philadelphia Flyers vs. (8) Toronto Maple Leafs ====
The Philadelphia Flyers entered the playoffs as the defending Stanley Cup champions, the Patrick Division champions, the Clarence Campbell Conference regular season champions, and the first seed overall earning 113 points during the regular season, winning the tie-breaker over both Buffalo and Montreal in total wins. The Toronto Maple Leafs were seeded eighth in the quarterfinals as the lowest remaining seed in the playoffs and qualified for the quarterfinals by defeating the Los Angeles Kings in the preliminary round. This was the first playoff series between these two teams. Philadelphia won this year's season series earning 7 of 8 points during the regular season.

April 13	Toronto Maple Leafs	3–6	Philadelphia Flyers	Spectrum	Recap
No scoring		First period	05:50 – pp – Rick MacLeish (1); 10:21 – Rick MacLeish (2)
Tiger Williams (1) – pp – 11:40; Blaine Stoughton (3) – pp – 18:56; Darryl Sittler (2) – pp – 19:31		Second period	No scoring
No scoring		Third period	09:25 – Bill Barber (1); 11:46 – Reggie Leach (1); 12:02 – Jimmy Watson (1); 19:53 – Rick MacLeish (3)
Gord McRae 20 saves / 26 shots		Goalie stats	Bernie Parent 20 saves / 23 shots

April 15	Toronto Maple Leafs	0–3	Philadelphia Flyers	Spectrum	Recap
No scoring		First period	No scoring
No scoring		Second period	03:35 – pp – Andre Dupont (1); 04:36 – Terry Crisp (1)
No scoring		Third period	05:12 – Terry Crisp (2)
Gord McRae 26 saves / 29 shots		Goalie stats	Bernie Parent 13 saves / 13 shots

April 17	Philadelphia Flyers	2–0	Toronto Maple Leafs	Maple Leaf Gardens	Recap
Gary Dornhoefer (1) – 03:08		First period	No scoring
Rick MacLeish (4) – 01:59		Second period	No scoring
No scoring		Third period	No scoring
Bernie Parent 31 saves / 31 shots		Goalie stats	Gord McRae 25 saves / 27 shots

April 19	Philadelphia Flyers	4–3	OT	Toronto Maple Leafs	Maple Leaf Gardens	Recap
Reggie Leach (2) – 03:38; Reggie Leach (3) – pp – 15:48		First period		02:47 – Blaine Stoughton (4); 11:17 – pp – Ron Ellis (2)
Bill Barber (2) – 08:22		Second period		No scoring
No scoring		Third period		13:23 – Ron Ellis (3)
Andre Dupont (2) – 01:45		First overtime period		No scoring
Bernie Parent 28 saves / 31 shots		Goalie stats		Gord McRae 29 saves / 33 shots

Philadelphia won series 4–0

==== (2) Buffalo Sabres vs. (7) Chicago Black Hawks ====
The Buffalo Sabres entered the playoffs as the Adams Division champions, the Prince of Wales Conference regular season champions, and the second seed overall earning 113 points during the regular season, losing the most wins tie-breaker to Philadelphia while winning the same tie-breaker over Montreal. The Chicago Black Hawks were seeded seventh in the quarterfinals as the second lowest remaining seed in the playoffs and qualified for the quarterfinals by defeating the Boston Bruins in the preliminary round. This was the first playoff series between these two teams. Buffalo won three of the four games in this year's regular season series.

April 13	Chicago Blackhawks	1–4	Buffalo Sabres	Buffalo Memorial Auditorium	Recap
No scoring		First period	02:11 – Danny Gare (1); 14:35 – Gilbert Perrault (1); 17:25 – Fred Stanfield (1)
Ivan Boldirev (3) – 14:22		Second period	No scoring
No scoring		Third period	18:30 – pp – Rick Martin (1)
Tony Esposito 26 saves / 30 shots		Goalie stats	Gerry Desjardins 18 saves / 19 shots

April 15	Chicago Blackhawks	1–3	Buffalo Sabres	Buffalo Memorial Auditorium	Recap
Stan Mikita (2) – 00:51		First period	01:35 – Danny Gare (2); 09:59 – Rick Dudley (1); 15:09 – pp – Rick Dudley (2)
No scoring		Second period	No scoring
No scoring		Third period	No scoring
Tony Esposito 18 saves / 21 shots		Goalie stats	Gerry Desjardins 26 saves / 27 shots

April 17	Buffalo Sabres	4–5	OT	Chicago Blackhawks	Chicago Stadium	Recap
Rick Martin (2) – pp – 05:00; Gilbert Perreault (2) – pp – 11:57		First period		01:26 – Grant Mulvey (1); 05:20 – pp – Ivan Boldirev (4); 14:43 – Dick Redmond (2)
Don Luce (1) – 08:37		Second period		15:38 – Cliff Koroll (3)
Jim Schoenfeld (1) – pp – 08:23		Third period		No scoring
No scoring		First overtime period		02:31 – Stan Mikita (3)
Gerry Desjardins 20 saves / 25 shots		Goalie stats		Tony Esposito 26 saves / 30 shots

April 20	Buffalo Sabres	6–2	Chicago Blackhawks	Chicago Stadium	Recap
No scoring		First period	14:17 – Grant Mulvey (2)
Peter McNab (1) – 00:30		Second period	No scoring
Jim Lorentz (1) – 00:17; Rick Martin (3) – pp – 01:47; Rene Robert (1) – 05:42; Danny Gare (3) – 10:51; Gilbert Perreault (3) – pp – 14:59		Third period	08:35 – Phil Russell (1)
Gerry Desjardins 19 saves / 21 shots		Goalie stats	Tony Esposito 32 saves / 38 shots

April 22	Chicago Blackhawks	1–3	Buffalo Sabres	Buffalo Memorial Auditorium	Recap
Pit Martin (1) – 18:51		First period	No scoring
No scoring		Second period	18:48 – Craig Ramsay (1)
No scoring		Third period	01:16 – Rene Robert (2); 15:54 – Jim Lorentz (2)
Tony Esposito 32 saves / 35 shots		Goalie stats	Gerry Desjardins 13 saves / 14 shots

Buffalo won series 4–1

==== (3) Montreal Canadiens vs. (6) Vancouver Canucks ====
The Montreal Canadiens entered the playoffs as the Norris Division champions, and the third seed overall earning 113 points during the regular season, losing the tie-breaker to both Philadelphia and Buffalo in total wins. The Vancouver Canucks entered the playoffs as the Smythe Division champions and the sixth seed in the quarterfinals as the third lowest remaining seed in the playoffs, earning 86 points during the regular season. This was the first playoff series between these two teams. Montreal swept all four games in this year's regular season series. This series also marked the first appearance of a team representing Vancouver in the Stanley Cup playoffs in 51 years. The most recent team to represent Vancouver before this was the Vancouver Maroons who lost to the Montreal Canadiens in the 1924 Stanley Cup semifinals.

April 13	Vancouver Canucks	2–6	Montreal Canadiens	Montreal Forum	Recap
Paulin Bordeleau (1) – 15:40; Gerry O'Flaherty (1) – 17:24		First period	09:02 – Guy Lapointe (1); 12:17 – pp – Guy Lapointe (2)
No scoring		Second period	09:29 – Guy Lafleur (1); 13:34 – pp – Yvan Cournoyer (1)
No scoring		Third period	11:04 – Guy Lafleur (2); 17:21 – Steve Shutt (1)
Ken Lockett 33 saves / 39 shots		Goalie stats	Ken Dryden 19 saves / 21 shots

April 15	Vancouver Canucks	2–1	Montreal Canadiens	Montreal Forum	Recap
No scoring		First period	No scoring
Gerry O'Flaherty (2) – 15:08		Second period	12:39 – Doug Risebrough (1)
Garry Monahan (1) – 13:46		Third period	No scoring
Gary Smith 38 saves / 39 shots		Goalie stats	Ken Dryden 25 saves / 27 shots

April 17	Montreal Canadiens	4–1	Vancouver Canucks	Pacific Coliseum	Recap
No scoring		First period	03:15 – John Gould (1)
Jimmy Roberts (1) – 03:56; Bob Gainey (1) – 15:06; Jacques Lemaire (1) – 19:28		Second period	No scoring
Guy Lafleur (3) – pp – 06:34		Third period	No scoring
Ken Dryden 25 saves / 26 shots		Goalie stats	Gary Smith 33 saves / 37 shots

April 19	Montreal Canadiens	4–0	Vancouver Canucks	Pacific Coliseum	Recap
No scoring		First period	No scoring
Guy Lafleur (4) – 04:06; Yvan Cournoyer (2) – 16:38		Second period	No scoring
Peter Mahovlich (1) – 07:35; Serge Savard (1) – 14:17		Third period	No scoring
Ken Dryden 37 saves / 37 shots		Goalie stats	Gary Smith 20 saves / 24 shots

April 22	Vancouver Canucks	4–5	OT	Montreal Canadiens	Montreal Forum	Recap
John Gould (2) – pp – 05:32		First period		No scoring
Paulin Bordeleau (2) – pp – 05:45; Andre Boudrias (1) – 10:38		Second period		01:40 – Peter Mahovlich (2); 04:21 – Yvan Cournoyer (3)
Bob Dailey (1) – 05:36		Third period		08:09 – Peter Mahovlich (3); 10:54 – Guy Lapointe (3)
No scoring		First overtime period		17:06 – Guy Lafleur (5)
Gary Smith 42 saves / 47 shots		Goalie stats		Ken Dryden 29 saves / 33 shots

Montreal won series 4–1

==== (4) Pittsburgh Penguins vs. (5) New York Islanders ====
The Pittsburgh Penguins entered the quarterfinals as the fourth seed and they qualified for this round by defeating the St. Louis Blues in the preliminary round. The New York Islanders were seeded fifth in the quarterfinals and qualified for this round by defeating the New York Rangers in the preliminary round. This was the first playoff series between these two teams. The teams split this year's regular season series. After trailing the series 3–0, the Islanders rallied to win four straight games and take the series. They became the second North American professional sports team (after the 1941–42 Toronto Maple Leafs) to accomplish such a feat. Ed Westfall scored the game-winning goal with 5:18 left in the third period of game seven to complete the comeback.

April 13	New York Islanders	4–5	Pittsburgh Penguins	Civic Arena	Recap
Andre St. Laurent (1) – 16:05		First period	02:05 – sh – Vic Hadfield (2); 10:59 – Ron Stackhouse (2); 14:52 – Pete Laframboise (1)
Bob Bourne (1) – pp – 12:10		Second period	No scoring
J. P. Parise (3) – pp – 06:52; J. P. Parise (4) – 17:47		Third period	00:36 – Bob Kelly (2); 04:44 – Dave Burrows (1)
Billy Smith 29 saves / 34 shots		Goalie stats	Gary Inness 36 saves / 40 shots

April 15	New York Islanders	1–3	Pittsburgh Penguins	Civic Arena	Recap
No scoring		First period	No scoring
No scoring		Second period	00:24 – Jean Pronovost (2); 09:30 – Lowell MacDonald (1)
Clark Gillies (3) – 15:34		Third period	14:51 – Lowell MacDonald (2)
Billy Smith 44 saves / 47 shots		Goalie stats	Gary Inness 32 saves / 33 shots

April 17	Pittsburgh Penguins	6–4	New York Islanders	Nassau Coliseum	Recap
Jean Pronovost (3) – 04:12; Bob Kelly (3) – 07:26		First period	No scoring
Bob Kelly (4) – 03:25		Second period	07:26 – sh – Ed Westfall (1)
Vic Hadfield (3) – 10:31; Syl Apps Jr. (2) – 18:15; Lowell MacDonald (3) – en – 19:48		Third period	01:17 – Jude Drouin (1); 17:41 – Bert Marshall (2); 19:08 – Jude Drouin (2)
Gary Inness 43 saves / 47 shots		Goalie stats	Billy Smith 26 saves / 31 shots

April 20	Pittsburgh Penguins	1–3	New York Islanders	Nassau Coliseum	Recap
No scoring		First period	03:48 – pp – Andre St. Laurent (2)
Bob Kelly (5) – pp – 08:18		Second period	No scoring
No scoring		Third period	06:16 – Clark Gillies (4); 06:55 – J.P. Parise (5)
Gary Inness 35 saves / 38 shots		Goalie stats	Chico Resch 27 saves / 28 shots

April 22	New York Islanders	4–2	Pittsburgh Penguins	Civic Arena	Recap
Billy Harris (2) – pp – 02:11; Ralph Stewart (1) – 05:24		First period	No scoring
Ed Westfall (2) – pp – 11:47		Second period	08:14 – Vic Hadfield (4)
Jude Drouin (3) – en – 19:30		Third period	17:06 – Lowell MacDonald (4)
Chico Resch 36 saves / 38 shots		Goalie stats	Gary Inness 15 saves / 18 shots

April 24	Pittsburgh Penguins	1–4	New York Islanders	Nassau Coliseum	Recap
No scoring		First period	No scoring
Pierre Larouche (2) – 04:56		Second period	04:07 – Ralph Stewart (2); 15:16 – Garry Howatt (1)
No scoring		Third period	19:34 – en – Ed Westfall (3); 19:59 – en – Garry Howatt (2)
Gary Inness 36 saves / 38 shots		Goalie stats	Chico Resch 31 saves / 32 shots

April 26	New York Islanders	1–0	Pittsburgh Penguins	Civic Arena	Recap
No scoring		First period	No scoring
No scoring		Second period	No scoring
Ed Westfall (4) – 14:42		Third period	No scoring
Chico Resch 30 saves / 30 shots		Goalie stats	Gary Inness 16 saves / 17 shots

New York won series 4–3

=== Semifinals ===
==== (1) Philadelphia Flyers vs. (4) New York Islanders ====
This was the first playoff series between these two teams. The Flyers won this year's season series earning eight of twelve points during the regular season. After becoming the second North American professional sports team to win a best-of-seven series after trailing 3–0 in the previous round against the Penguins, the Islanders almost accomplished the same feat in this round. However, the Flyers firmly defeated them in game seven to preserve the series win. In doing so, the Islanders set a record for most consecutive playoff wins (8) when facing elimination. This would mark the last time an NHL team forced a seventh game of a best-of-seven series after trailing 3–0 until the Flyers themselves did so against Boston in the 2010 Eastern Conference semifinals.

April 29	New York Islanders	0–4	Philadelphia Flyers	Spectrum	Recap
No scoring		First period	06:04 – Don Saleski (1)
No scoring		Second period	02:39 – Bill Barber (3); 18:19 – sh – Bobby Clarke (1)
No scoring		Third period	01:34 – pp – Rick MacLeish (5)
Chico Resch 21 saves / 25 shots		Goalie stats	Wayne Stephenson 21 saves / 21 shots

May 1	New York Islanders	4–5	OT	Philadelphia Flyers	Spectrum	Recap
Denis Potvin (3) – pp – 05:34		First period		03:13 – Gary Dornhoefer (2); 07:38 – Reggie Leach (4); 09:50 – pp – Tom Bladon (1)
J. P. Parise (6) – pp – 12:22		Second period		00:58 – Bill Barber (4)
J.P. Parise (7) – 13:46; Denis Potvin (4) – 14:00		Third period		No scoring
No scoring		First overtime period		02:56 – Bobby Clarke (2)
Billy Smith 22 saves / 27 shots		Goalie stats		Wayne Stephenson 26 saves / 30 shots

May 4	Philadelphia Flyers	1–0	New York Islanders	Nassau Coliseum	Recap
No scoring		First period	No scoring
No scoring		Second period	No scoring
Reggie Leach (5) – 00:30		Third period	No scoring
Bernie Parent 14 saves / 14 shots		Goalie stats	Chico Resch 31 saves / 32 shots

May 7	Philadelphia Flyers	3–4	OT	New York Islanders	Nassau Coliseum	Recap
No scoring		First period		04:58 – pp – Ed Westfall (5)
Ross Lonsberry (1) – 17:24; Rick MacLeish (6) – 19:21		Second period		05:29 – Gerry Hart (1); 12:49 – pp – Ralph Stewart (3)
Rick MacLeish (7) – 04:48		Third period		No scoring
No scoring		First overtime period		01:53 – Jude Drouin (4)
Bernie Parent 24 saves / 28 shots		Goalie stats		Chico Resch 36 saves / 39 shots

May 8	New York Islanders	5–1	Philadelphia Flyers	Spectrum	Recap
J. P. Parise (8) – pp – 14:19		First period	No scoring
Billy Harris (3) – 14:23; Jude Drouin (5) – 17:35		Second period	No scoring
Bobby Nystrom (1) – 10:51; Garry Howatt (3) – 18:23		Third period	15:10 – Bob Kelly (1)
Chico Resch 28 saves / 29 shots		Goalie stats	Bernie Parent 19 saves / 24 shots

May 11	Philadelphia Flyers	1–2	New York Islanders	Nassau Coliseum	Recap
Ross Lonsberry (2) – 01:42		First period	No scoring
No scoring		Second period	16:15 – pp – Denis Potvin (5)
No scoring		Third period	03:42 – Gerry Hart (2)
Bernie Parent 25 saves / 27 shots		Goalie stats	Chico Resch 28 saves / 29 shots

May 13	New York Islanders	1–4	Philadelphia Flyers	Spectrum	Recap
Jude Drouin (6) – pp – 05:02		First period	00:19 – Gary Dornhoefer (3); 02:27 – pp – Rick MacLeish (8); 07:11 – pp – Rick MacLeish (9)
No scoring		Second period	No scoring
No scoring		Third period	18:52 – en – Rick MacLeish (10)
Chico Resch 31 saves / 34 shots		Goalie stats	Bernie Parent 14 saves / 15 shots

Philadelphia won series 4–3

==== (2) Buffalo Sabres vs. (3) Montreal Canadiens ====
This was the second playoff series between these two teams, with Montreal winning the only previous meeting in six games in the 1973 Stanley Cup quarterfinals. Buffalo won this year's season series earning nine of ten points during the regular season.

April 27	Montreal Canadiens	5–6	OT	Buffalo Sabres	Buffalo Memorial Auditorium	Recap
Guy Lapointe (4) – pp – 00:32; Guy Lafleur (6) – 18:29		First period		05:12 – pp – Rick Martin (4); 11:22 – Rene Robert (3); 18:07 – Rick Dudley (3)
Guy Lapointe (5) – sh – 06:44; Yvan Cournoyer (4) – pp – 10:57		Second period		18:15 – Gilbert Perreault (4)
Jacques Lemaire (2) – 19:36		Third period		04:20 – Jim Lorentz (3)
No scoring		First overtime period		04:42 – Danny Gare (4)
Ken Dryden 37 saves / 43 shots		Goalie stats		Gerry Desjardins 2 saves / 3 shots Roger Crozier 24 saves / 28 shots

April 29	Montreal Canadiens	2–4	Buffalo Sabres	Buffalo Memorial Auditorium	Recap
No scoring		First period	17:20 – Don Luce (2)
Yvon Lambert (1) – pp – 11:22		Second period	09:53 – Jim Lorentz (4)
Henri Richard (1) – 09:00		Third period	01:27 – Craig Ramsay (2); 19:50 – en – Danny Gare (5)
Ken Dryden 31 saves / 34 shots		Goalie stats	Roger Crozier 25 saves / 27 shots

May 1	Buffalo Sabres	0–7	Montreal Canadiens	Montreal Forum	Recap
No scoring		First period	01:38 – pp – Peter Mahovlich (4); 18:56 – Guy Lafleur (7)
No scoring		Second period	17:33 – Jacques Lemaire (3)
No scoring		Third period	01:24 – Yvon Lambert (2); 08:51 – Doug Risebrough (2); 14:55 – pp – Guy Lafleur (8); 15:22 – Guy Lafleur (9)
Roger Crozier 26 saves / 31 shots Gerry Desjardins 7 saves / 9 shots		Goalie stats	Ken Dryden

May 3	Buffalo Sabres	2–8	Montreal Canadiens	Montreal Forum	Recap
Don Luce (3) – sh – 06:42		First period	07:59 – Bob Gainey (2); 19:21 – pp – Jacques Lemaire (4)
No scoring		Second period	12:51 – pp – Guy Lafleur (10); 15:30 – Yvon Lambert (3)
Jerry Korab (1) – 10:28		Third period	03:08 – pp – Guy Lafleur (11); 06:34 – pp – Yvon Lambert (4); 08:48 – pp – Guy Lapointe (6); 17:52 – Glen Sather (1)
Gerry Desjardins 35 saves / 43 shots		Goalie stats	Ken Dryden 23 saves / 25 shots

May 6	Montreal Canadiens	4–5	OT	Buffalo Sabres	Buffalo Memorial Auditorium	Recap
Jacques Lemaire (5) – 02:51; Yvan Cournoyer (5) – 19:53		First period		02:18 – Craig Ramsay (3); 08:37 – Fred Stanfield (2); 17:03 – pp – Gilbert Perreault (5)
Doug Risebrough (3) – 08:40		Second period		No scoring
Jimmy Roberts (2) – 03:10		Third period		14:35 – pp – Craig Ramsay (4)
No scoring		First overtime period		05:56 – Rene Robert (4)
Ken Dryden 40 saves / 45 shots		Goalie stats		Gerry Desjardins 15 saves / 19 shots

May 8	Buffalo Sabres	4–3	Montreal Canadiens	Montreal Forum	Recap
Craig Ramsay (5) – sh – 02:05; Rick Martin (5) – 08:51; Peter McNab (2) – 12:48		First period	09:48 – Peter Mahovlich (5)
Jim Lorentz (5) – 09:33		Second period	No scoring
No scoring		Third period	08:05 – Guy Lafleur (12); 18:55 – Peter Mahovlich (6)
Gerry Desjardins 29 saves / 32 shots		Goalie stats	Ken Dryden 23 saves / 27 shots

Buffalo won series 4–2

=== Stanley Cup Final ===
The defending Stanley Cup champion Philadelphia Flyers' appeared in their second consecutive Stanley Cup Final and second overall. In the previous year's Stanley Cup Final, the Flyers defeated the Boston Bruins in six games. This was the Buffalo Sabres' first Stanley Cup Final appearance in their fifth season. This was the first playoff series (and only Cup Final) meeting between these two teams. The Philadelphia Flyers won this year's regular season series earning seven of eight points.

In the first Stanley Cup Final matchup between two expansion teams, the Philadelphia Flyers beat the Buffalo Sabres four games to two for their second consecutive Stanley Cup.

May 15	Buffalo Sabres	1–4	Philadelphia Flyers	Spectrum	Recap
No scoring		First period	No scoring
No scoring		Second period	No scoring
Rick Martin (6) – pp – 11:07		Third period	03:42 – Bill Barber (5); 07:29 – pp – Ross Lonsberry (3); 11:41 – pp – Bobby Clarke (3); 19:02 – en – Bill Barber (6)
Gerry Desjardins 18 saves / 21 shots		Goalie stats	Bernie Parent 27 saves / 28 shots

May 18	Buffalo Sabres	1–2	Philadelphia Flyers	Spectrum	Recap
No scoring		First period	No scoring
No scoring		Second period	08:24 – Reggie Leach (6)
Jerry Korab (2) – 02:18		Third period	06:43 – pp – Bobby Clarke (4)
Gerry Desjardins 22 saves / 24 shots		Goalie stats	Bernie Parent 18 saves / 19 shots

May 20	Philadelphia Flyers	4–5	OT	Buffalo Sabres	Buffalo Memorial Auditorium	Recap
Gary Dornhoefer (4) – 00:39; Don Saleski (2) – 03:09; Rick MacLeish (11) – 14:13		First period		11:46 – Danny Gare (6); 12:03 – Rick Martin (7)
Reggie Leach (7) – 14:30		Second period		00:29 – Don Luce (4)
No scoring		Third period		09:56 – Bill Hajt (1)
No scoring		First overtime period		18:29 – Rene Robert (5)
Bernie Parent 41 saves / 46 shots		Goalie stats		Gerry Desjardins 3 saves / 6 shots Roger Crozier 26 saves / 27 shots

May 22	Philadelphia Flyers	2–4	Buffalo Sabres	Buffalo Memorial Auditorium	Recap
Andre Dupont (3) – 11:28		First period	No scoring
Ross Lonsberry (4) – 04:20		Second period	03:46 – pp – Jerry Korab (3); 10:07 – pp – Gilbert Perreault (6); 15:07 – Jim Lorentz (6)
No scoring		Third period	19:28 – en – Danny Gare (7)
Bernie Parent 23 saves / 26 shots		Goalie stats	Gerry Desjardins 23 saves / 25 shots

May 25	Buffalo Sabres	1–5	Philadelphia Flyers	Spectrum	Recap
No scoring		First period	03:12 – Dave Schultz (1); 12:31 – Gary Dornhoefer (5); 12:50 – Bob Kelly (2)
No scoring		Second period	01:55 – pp – Reggie Leach (8); 09:56 – Dave Schultz (2)
Don Luce (5) – 14:02		Third period	No scoring
Gerry Desjardins 21 saves / 26 shots		Goalie stats	Bernie Parent 23 saves / 24 shots

May 27	Philadelphia Flyers	2–0	Buffalo Sabres	Buffalo Memorial Auditorium	Recap
No scoring		First period	No scoring
No scoring		Second period	No scoring
Bob Kelly (3) – 00:11; Bill Clement (1) – 17:13		Third period	No scoring
Bernie Parent 32 saves / 32 shots		Goalie stats	Roger Crozier 29 saves / 31 shots

Philadelphia won series 4–2

== Awards ==
1975 NHL awards
Prince of Wales Trophy: (Wales Conference regular season champion)	Buffalo Sabres
Clarence S. Campbell Bowl: (Campbell Conference regular season champion)	Philadelphia Flyers
Art Ross Trophy: (Top scorer, regular season)	Bobby Orr, Boston Bruins
Bill Masterton Memorial Trophy: (Perseverance, sportsmanship, and dedication)	Don Luce, Buffalo Sabres
Calder Memorial Trophy: (Top first-year player)	Eric Vail, Atlanta Flames
Conn Smythe Trophy: (Most valuable player, playoffs)	Bernie Parent, Philadelphia Flyers
Hart Memorial Trophy: (Most valuable player, regular season)	Bobby Clarke, Philadelphia Flyers
Jack Adams Award: (Best coach)	Bob Pulford, Los Angeles Kings
James Norris Memorial Trophy: (Best defenceman)	Bobby Orr, Boston Bruins
Lady Byng Memorial Trophy: (Excellence and sportsmanship)	Marcel Dionne, Detroit Red Wings
Lester B. Pearson Award: (Outstanding player, regular season)	Bobby Orr, Boston Bruins
Vezina Trophy: (Goaltender(s) of team(s) with best goaltending record)	Bernie Parent, Philadelphia Flyers

=== All-Star teams ===
First Team	Position	Second Team
Bernie Parent, Philadelphia Flyers	G	Rogie Vachon, Los Angeles Kings
Bobby Orr, Boston Bruins	D	Guy Lapointe, Montreal Canadiens
Denis Potvin, New York Islanders	D	Borje Salming, Toronto Maple Leafs
Bobby Clarke, Philadelphia Flyers	C	Phil Esposito, Boston Bruins
Guy Lafleur, Montreal Canadiens	RW	Rene Robert, Buffalo Sabres
Rick Martin, Buffalo Sabres	LW	Steve Vickers, New York Rangers

Source: NHL.

== Player statistics ==
=== Scoring leaders ===
Note: GP = Games played; G = Goals; A = Assists; Pts = Points

Player	Team	GP	G	A	Pts	PIM
Bobby Orr	Boston Bruins	80	46	89	135	101
Phil Esposito	Boston Bruins	79	61	66	127	62
Marcel Dionne	Detroit Red Wings	80	47	74	121	14
Guy Lafleur	Montreal Canadiens	70	53	66	119	37
Peter Mahovlich	Montreal Canadiens	80	35	82	117	64
Bobby Clarke	Philadelphia Flyers	80	27	89	116	125
Rene Robert	Buffalo Sabres	74	40	60	100	75
Rod Gilbert	New York Rangers	76	36	61	97	22
Gilbert Perreault	Buffalo Sabres	68	39	57	96	36
Rick Martin	Buffalo Sabres	68	52	43	95	72

Source: NHL.

=== Leading goaltenders ===
Note: GP = Games played; Min = Minutes played; GA = Goals against; GAA = Goals against average; W = Wins; L = Losses; T = Ties; SO = Shutouts

Player	Team	GP	MIN	GA	GAA	W	L	T	SO
Bernie Parent	Philadelphia Flyers	68	4041	137	2.03	44	14	10	12
Rogie Vachon	L.A. Kings	54	3239	121	2.24	27	14	13	6
Gary Edwards	L.A. Kings	27	1561	61	2.34	15	3	8	3
Chico Resch	N.Y. Islanders	25	1432	59	2.47	12	7	5	3
Roger Crozier	Buffalo Sabres	23	1260	55	2.62	17	2	1	3
Ken Dryden	Montreal Canadiens	56	3320	149	2.69	30	9	16	4
Tony Esposito	Chicago Black Hawks	71	4219	193	2.74	34	30	7	6
Billy Smith	N.Y. Islanders	58	3368	156	2.78	21	18	17	3
Dan Bouchard	Atlanta Flames	40	2400	111	2.78	20	15	5	3
Phil Myre	Atlanta Flames	40	2400	114	2.85	14	16	10	5

=== Other statistics ===
- Plus-minus: Bobby Orr, Boston Bruins: +80
- All Time NHL record for most Penalty Minutes in a season: 472, Dave Schultz, Philadelphia Flyers

== Coaches ==
=== Patrick Division ===
- Atlanta Flames: Bernie Geoffrion
- New York Islanders: Al Arbour
- New York Rangers: Emile Francis
- Philadelphia Flyers: Fred Shero

=== Adams Division ===
- Boston Bruins: Don Cherry
- Buffalo Sabres: Floyd Smith
- California Golden Seals: Marshall Johnston and Bill McCreary Sr.
- Toronto Maple Leafs: Red Kelly

=== Norris Division ===
- Detroit Red Wings: Alex Delvecchio
- Los Angeles Kings: Bob Pulford
- Montreal Canadiens: Scotty Bowman
- Pittsburgh Penguins: Marc Boileau
- Washington Capitals: Jim Anderson and Milt Schmidt

=== Smythe Division ===
- Chicago Black Hawks: Billy Reay
- Kansas City Scouts: Bep Guidolin
- Minnesota North Stars: Jack Gordon and Charlie Burns
- St. Louis Blues: Lou Angotti, Lynn Patrick and Garry Young
- Vancouver Canucks: Phil Maloney

== Debuts ==
The following is a list of players of note who played their first NHL game in 1974–75 (listed with their first team):

- Guy Chouinard, Atlanta Flames
- Danny Gare, Buffalo Sabres
- Charlie Simmer, California Golden Seals
- Wilf Paiement, Kansas City Scouts
- Dave Hutchison, Los Angeles Kings
- Clark Gillies, New York Islanders
- Bob Bourne, New York Islanders
- Rick Middleton, New York Rangers
- Ron Greschner, New York Rangers
- Bob MacMillan, New York Rangers
- Pierre Larouche, Pittsburgh Penguins
- Mario Tremblay, Montreal Canadiens
- Tiger Williams, Toronto Maple Leafs
- Harold Snepsts, Vancouver Canucks

== Last games ==
The following is a list of players of note that played their last game in the NHL in 1974–75 (listed with their last team):

- Murray Oliver, Minnesota North Stars
- Henri Richard, Montreal Canadiens
- Bobby Rousseau, New York Rangers
- Ted Harris, Philadelphia Flyers
- Eddie Shack, Toronto Maple Leafs
- Norm Ullman, Toronto Maple Leafs
- Doug Mohns, Washington Capitals

NOTE: Ullman would finish his major professional career in the World Hockey Association.

== Broadcasting ==
Hockey Night in Canada on CBC Television televised Saturday night regular season games and Stanley Cup playoff games. HNIC also produced Wednesday night regular season game telecasts for CTV.

This was the third and final season under the U.S. rights agreement with NBC, airing weekend afternoon regular season games and playoff games. This would be the last season until the 1990s that NHL games would air on American network television. Unable to sign a U.S. national television contract for the 1975–76 season, the league put together a broadcast syndication package called the NHL Network to have games aired on various independent stations.

== See also ==
- List of Stanley Cup champions
- 1974 NHL amateur draft
- 1974 NHL expansion draft
- 1974–75 NHL transactions
- 28th National Hockey League All-Star Game
- National Hockey League All-Star Game
- List of WHA seasons
- Lester Patrick Trophy
- 1974 in sports
- 1975 in sports
