= Salt Lake Golden Eagles =

Former professional minor league ice hockey team in Salt Lake City, Utah

- City: Salt Lake City, Utah
- League: WHL (1969–1974); CHL (1974–1984); IHL (1984–1994)
- Operated: 1969–1994
- Home arena: Salt Palace (1969–1991); Delta Center (1991–1994)

Franchise history
- 1969–1994: Salt Lake Golden Eagles
- 1994–2001: Detroit Vipers

Championships
- Regular season titles: 3 (1978–1979, 1979–1980, 1981–1982)
- Division titles: 3 (1974–1975, 1981–1982, 1988–1989)
- Turner Cups: 2 (1986–87, 1987–88)
- Adams Cups: 3 (1974–75, 1979–80, 1980–81)

The Salt Lake Golden Eagles were a minor professional hockey team based in Salt Lake City from 1969 to 1994.

== History ==
They played in the Western Hockey League from 1969 to 1974, the Central Hockey League from 1974 to 1984 and the International Hockey League from 1984 to 1994. The Golden Eagles home arena was the Salt Palace from 1969 to 1991 and the Delta Center from 1991 to 1994. In 1994 Larry H. Miller, who also owned the Utah Jazz and the Delta Center, sold the team to Detroit interests. The Golden Eagles became the Detroit Vipers.

Teams that succeeded the Golden Eagles in this market:

- Utah Grizzlies – IHL 1995–2001; AHL 2001–2005
- Utah Grizzlies – ECHL 2005–2026
- Utah Mammoth – NHL 2024–present

NHL parent clubs.
WHL: California Golden Seals (1972–1974) Buffalo Sabres (1970–1972) Montreal Canadiens (1969–1970) Boston Bruins (1969–1970)
CHL: Minnesota North Stars (1983–1984) St. Louis Blues (1977–1983) Cleveland Barons (NHL) (1976–1977) California Golden Seals (1974–1976) Los Angeles Kings (1974–1975)
IHL: New York Islanders (1993–1994) Calgary Flames (1987–1993)

== Season-by-season results ==
- Salt Lake Golden Eagles 1969–1974 (Western Hockey League)
- Salt Lake Golden Eagles 1974–1984 (Central Hockey League)
- Salt Lake Golden Eagles 1984–1994 (International Hockey League)

=== Regular season ===
Season	League	Games	Won	Lost	Tied	OTL	SOL	Points	Goals for	Goals against	Standing
1969–70	WHL	72	15	43	14	--	--	44	240	366	7th
1970–71	WHL	72	18	49	5	--	--	41	217	327	6th
1971–72	WHL	72	29	33	10	--	--	68	250	254	5th
1972–73	WHL	72	32	25	15	--	--	79	288	259	2nd
1973–74	WHL	78	41	33	4	--	--	86	356	297	2nd
1974–75	CHL	78	43	24	11	--	--	97	317	245	1st, North
1975–76	CHL	76	37	35	4	--	--	78	300	299	3rd
1976–77	CHL	76	31	39	6	--	--	68	276	288	5th
1977–78	CHL	76	42	31	3	--	--	87	283	238	2nd
1978–79	CHL	76	47	22	7	--	--	101	314	209	1st
1979–80	CHL	80	49	24	7	--	--	105	342	259	1st
1980–81	CHL	80	46	29	5	--	--	97	368	295	2nd
1981–82	CHL	80	47	30	3	--	--	97	368	329	1st, North
1982–83	CHL	80	41	38	1	--	--	83	318	312	4th
1983–84	CHL	72	35	35	2	--	--	72	334	330	3rd
1984–85	IHL	82	35	39	8	--	--	82	332	323	6th
1985–86	IHL	82	44	36	--	2	--	90	340	325	4th, West
1986–87	IHL	82	39	31	12	--	--	90	360	357	2nd, West
1987–88	IHL	82	40	34	--	8	--	88	308	303	2nd, West
1988–89	IHL	82	56	22	--	4	--	116	369	294	1st, West
1989–90	IHL	82	37	36	--	9	--	83	326	311	2nd, West
1990–91	IHL	83	50	28	--	5	--	105	353	296	2nd, West
1991–92	IHL	82	33	40	--	9	--	75	252	304	4th, West
1992–93	IHL	82	38	39	--	5	--	81	269	305	2nd, Pacific
1993–94	IHL	81	24	52	--	5	--	53	243	377	4th, Pacific

=== Playoffs ===
Season	1st round	2nd round	Finals
1969–70	Out of playoffs.
1970–71	Out of playoffs.
1971–72	Out of playoffs.
1972–73	N/A	Beat Denver 4-1	Lost 0-4 in finals to Phoenix
1973–74	Lost to Portland 1-4	--	--
1974–75	bye	Beat Omaha 3-1	Won Adams Cup, 4-3-Dallas
1975–76	Lost to Dallas 1-4	--	--
1976–77	Out of playoffs.
1977–78	Lost to Dallas 2-4	--	--
1978–79	N/A	N/A	Lost 1-4 in finals to Dallas
1979–80	N/A	N/A	Won Adams Cup, 4-3-Ft.Worth
1980–81	W, 3–2, FW	W, 4–1, Tulsa	Won Adams Cup, 4-3- Wichita
1981–82	W, 3–1, Oklahoma City	L, 2–4, Dallas	--
1982–83	L, 2-4, Indianapolis	--	--
1983–84	Out of playoffs.
1984–85	L, 3-4, Fort Wayne	--	--
1985–86	L, 1-4, Fort Wayne	--	--
1986–87	W, 4-2, Milwaukee	W, 4-1, Fort Wayne	Won Turner Cup, 4-2, Muskegon
1987–88	W, 4–3, Peoria	W, 4–2, Colorado	Won Turner Cup, 4–2, Flint
1988–89	W, 4–0, Denver	W, 4–1, Milwaukee	L, 1–4, Muskegon
1989–90	W, 4–2, Milwaukee	L, 1–4, Indianapolis	--
1990–91	L, 0–4, Phoenix	--	--
1991–92	L, 1–4, Kansas City	--	--
1992–93	Out of playoffs.
1993–94	Out of playoffs.
