= Indianapolis Checkers =

- City: Indianapolis, Indiana
- League: CHL (1979–84); IHL (1984–87)
- Operated: 1979–1987
- Home arena: Fairgrounds Coliseum; Market Square Arena
- Affiliate: New York Islanders

Franchise history
- 1979–1987: Indianapolis Checkers
- 1987–1988: Colorado Rangers
- 1988–1989: Denver Rangers
- 1989–1997: Phoenix Roadrunners

The Indianapolis Checkers were a minor league professional ice hockey team from Indianapolis, Indiana. The Checkers' home arena was the Fairgrounds Coliseum from 1981 to 1985 and Market Square Arena from 1979 to 1981 and again from 1985 to 1987. The team originated in the Central Hockey League where they played from 1979 to 1984. The Checkers filled a void left by the departed Indianapolis Racers of the World Hockey Association. Indianapolis won the Adams Cup as the CHL champions twice, in 1982 and 1983.

The team transferred to the International Hockey League, where they played from 1984 to 1987. At the completion of the 1986–87 season, the team was relocated to Denver, Colorado, and renamed the Denver Rangers.

== Season-by-season results ==
Season	Games	Won	Lost	Tied	Points	Goals for	Goals against	Coach
1984–85	82	31	47	4	69	284	318	Darcy Regier
1985–86	82	41	35	1	88	296	303	Ron Ullyot
1986–87	82	37	38	7	81	360	387	Ron Ullyot
