= Ice hockey in Rhode Island =

- Flag of Rhode Island
- Country: United States
- Governing body: USA Hockey
- National teams: Men's national team Women's national team
- First played: 1893

Club competitions
- List: AHL (minor professional) NCAA (collegiate) EHL (junior)

Rhode Island is one of the traditional centers of ice hockey in the United States. Located in New England, the font of American ice hockey, teams from Rhode Island have played organized hockey as far back as the late-19th century and many residents have played at the highest levels of the sport.

== History ==
Brown's first hockey team

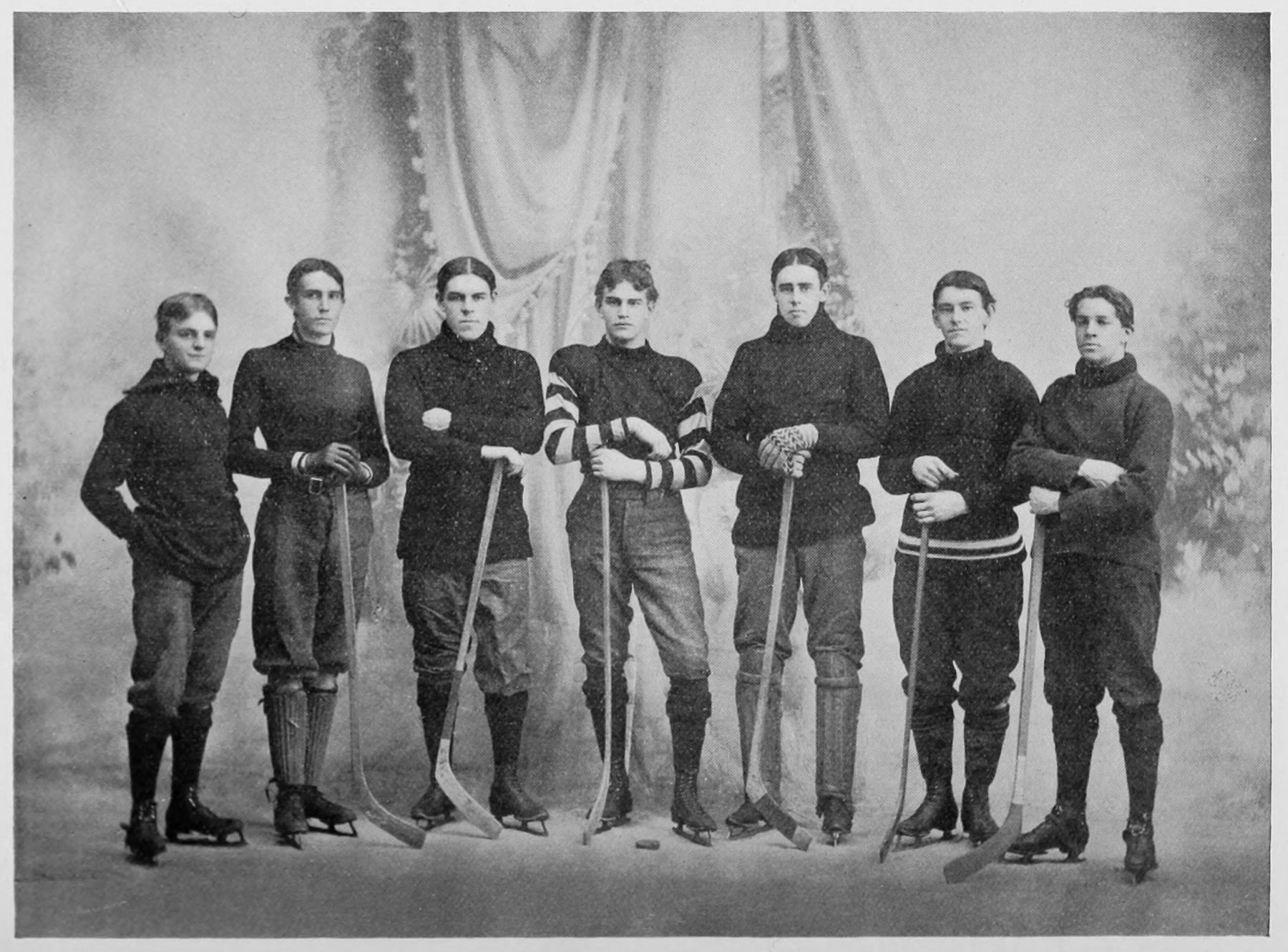
First Brown University hockey team in 1897–98. From left: Robert Steere, Harris Bucklin, Jesse Pevear, Irving Hunt, Albert Barrows, Charles Cooke, Horace Day.

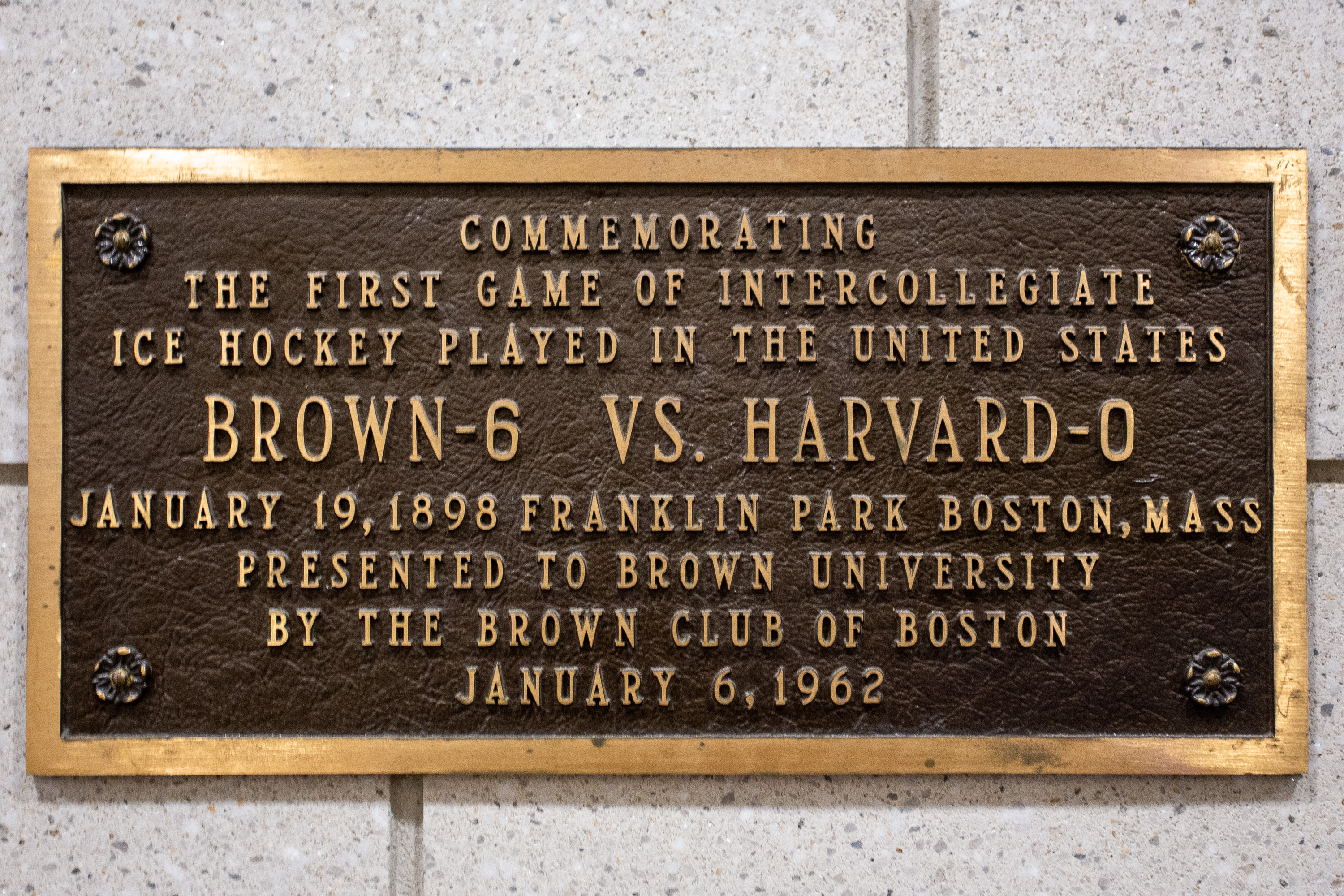
Plaque in Meehan Auditorium honors the first game

When ice hockey began to be introduced to the United States in the 1890s, there were no artificial ice rinks in the state. When nearby colleges Yale, Penn and Columbia began fielding teams of their own, their traditional rival Brown followed in short order. Brown played its first game on January 19, 1898, and defeated Harvard 6–0. The team, led by Irving O. Hunt, would go on to win the intercollegiate championship that season, the first time a collegiate ice hockey championship was ever awarded. Despite its early success, Brown was hamstrung by the lack of a local rink and the team was forced to construct a temporary surface atop the school's baseball diamond, Aldrich Field. This situation was untenable for the Bears and caused the team to plummet in the college hockey rankings. By 1906 the school knew that there was no impending remedy for the team and the program was shuttered.

Very little happened in the sport over the next 20 years but that was changed in February 1926 when the Rhode Island Auditorium opened its doors. The arena was located in downtown Providence and was the first indoor ice rink in the state. Almost immediately after opening, it served as the home venue for a host of teams. First a foremost was the Providence Reds, one of the founding members of the Canadian–American Hockey League, a precursor to the American Hockey League, both minor professional leagues that send many players into the National Hockey League. Other tenants that first season also included two college teams. Brown returned after a 20-year absence and used the building as its home until 1962 while Providence also inaugurated its ice hockey program. Financial difficulties would force the Friars to cease after that one season but the team would eventually return after World War II.

While Brown saw little success after their return, the Reds became one of the top minor teams in the country. Providence won three league titles in both the 1930s and 40s to establish the bonafides of ice hockey in Rhode Island. During this time the grassroots of hockey were beginning to take hold and several home-grown players would go on to achieve notoriety. George Pulliam, Bob Monahan and Ed Zifcak grew up during this period and each would eventually become an All-American. Ralph Warburton became the first home-grown player to play for the US national team at the Olympics and was one of the top performers with 21 points in just 8 games.

In 1972 the Reds moved out of the old Auditorium and into the Providence Civic Center but the change of venue did not help their ailing finances. The team had been mired in mediocrity for most of the previous decade and attendance numbers had fallen. A resurgence in their new venue was unable to get enough interest back into the team and in 1977, the team moved to Binghamton, New York. The state was left without a professional team for 15 years until the Boston Bruins relocated their AHL affiliate from Maine. The Providence Bruins played their first season in 1992–93 and shot out of the gate by winning a division title in their first year. The team would remain as one of the better teams in the league and went on to win the Calder Cup in 1999, the first league championship for a Rhode Island team since Brown's win more than a century before.

In the meantime, Rhode Island was one of the early adopters of women's ice hockey. Brown was the first school to field a varsity women's team, playing its first games in 1967. Providence was not far behind when it started its women's program in 1974. Brown's women's team reached the national championship game in 2002, losing to Minnesota Duluth.

== Teams ==
=== Professional ===
==== Active ====
Team	City	League	Arena	Founded
Providence Bruins	Providence	AHL	Amica Mutual Pavilion	1992

==== Inactive ====
Team	City	League	Years active	Fate
Providence Reds	Providence	AHL	1926–1977	Hartford Wolf Pack
Rhode Island Eagles	Woonsocket	EHL	1972–1973	Defunct
Rhode Island Storm	Kingston	NEPHL	2009–2010	Defunct

=== Collegiate ===
==== Active ====
Team	City	Gender	Division	League	Arena	Founded
Brown Bears	Providence	Men's	NCAA Division I	ECAC Hockey	Meehan Auditorium	1897
Brown Bears	Providence	Women's	NCAA Division I	ECAC Hockey	Meehan Auditorium	1967
Providence Friars	Providence	Men's	NCAA Division I	Hockey East	Schneider Arena	1926
Providence Friars	Providence	Women's	NCAA Division I	Hockey East	Schneider Arena	1974
Johnson & Wales	Providence	Men's	NCAA Division III	NEHC	New England Sports Village	1997
Johnson & Wales	Providence	Women's	NCAA Division III	NEHC	New England Sports Village	2015
Salve Regina	Newport	Men's	NCAA Division III	CCC	St. George's Ice Arena	1997
Salve Regina	Newport	Women's	NCAA Division III	CCC	St. George's Ice Arena	1999

==== Inactive ====
Team	City	Gender	Division	League	Years active
Bryant	Smithfield	Men's	NCAA Division II	ECAC 2	1973–1980
Roger Williams	Bristol	Men's	NCAA Division III	ECAC North/South/Central	1983–1998

=== Junior ===
Team	City	League	Arena	Founded
HC Rhode Island	Warwick	EHL	Thayer Arena	2022
Providence HC	Providence	EHL	Dennis M. Lynch Arena	2023

=== Timeline ===
Active Active (out of state)

== Players ==
As of end of the 2022–23 season, Rhode Island had 3,566 registered with USA Hockey. This placed Rhode Island as 14th in the nation in terms of population percentage (0.316%).

Due to the state's low population (approximately 1.1 million as of 2020), fewer players from Rhode Island are seen at high levels of the sport. However, some have gone on to achieve notoriety.

- Ralph Warburton was a 4-year player at Dartmouth in the mid-40s and joined the national team for the 1948 Winter Olympics. He was one of team's top scorers, averaging 2 goals per game during the competition. The team finished with a 5–3 record, good enough for 4th-place.
- Robert Gaudreau was a 2-time All-American at Brown in the mid-60s. He was also named as the ECAC Hockey Best Defensive Defenseman in 1966. Two years later he was a member of the national team at the 1968 Winter Olympics. His son, Rob followed in his footsteps, playing college hockey at rival Providence. He was also an All-American and later played four years in the NHL. Both are members of the Rhode Island Hockey Hall of Fame.
- Brian Lawton, though born in New Jersey, was raised in Cumberland and became a star player at Mount Saint Charles Academy. He was so well regarded as a junior player that he became the first US-born player chosen with the 1st selection in the NHL entry draft. While his professional career did not meet those high expectations, he remained in the game as both an executive and broadcaster.
- Sara DeCosta-Hayes played college hockey for Providence and helped the US national team win the inaugural gold medal for women's hockey at the Nagano Olympics. She remained with the team through the 2002 Olympics, earning a silver medal in Provo.
- Brian Boucher was a long-time goaltender in the NHL, playing mostly for the Philadelphia Flyers. Though he was a backup for much of his career, Boucher had several outstanding periods in his career. In 2004, while playing for Phoenix, Boucher set the modern-day record for consecutive shutout streak at 332, not allowing a goal for over 5 games. A few years later he helped the Flyers reach the Stanley Cup Finals, winning 6 games during the run.
- Bryan Berard was the second player from Rhode Island taken first at the NHL Draft. He performed well in 5 seasons but had his career derailed by a severe injury. In a game against the Ottawa Senators, Berard was hit in the eye by a stick and was told that he may lose the eye. Berard underwent several surgeries and was able to regain limited use of the eye (20/600 vision). With the aid of a contact, he was able to improve the vision in the eye to meet the NHL minimum of 20/400 and returned to play a year and a half after suffering the injury.

=== Notable players by city ===
location of cities

==== Bristol ====
- Ed Lee

==== Coventry ====
- Meaghan Rickard

==== Cranston ====
- Bill Bennett ^{†}
- Curt Bennett ^{†}
- Harvey Bennett Jr.
- John Bennett
- Dave Capuano ^{†}
- Jack Capuano
- David Emma
- Joe Exter
- Rob Gaudreau
- David Littman
- Tom Mellor
- Digit Murphy
- George Pulliam
- David Quinn
- J. Allan Soares
- Ralph Warburton

==== Cumberland ====
- Brian Lawton ^{†}

==== East Greenwich ====
- Steven King

==== Johnston ====
- Noel Acciari

==== Newport ====
- Scott Shaunessy

==== North Providence ====
- Cody Wild ^{†}

==== North Smithfield ====
- Jeff Jillson

==== Pascoag ====
- Ed Zifcak

==== Providence ====
Includes East Providence.

- Bill Army
- Robert Gaudreau
- Bob Monahan
- Brendan Whittet

==== Riverside ====
- Ron Wilson ^{†}

==== Warwick ====
- Tom Cavanagh
- Sara DeCosta-Hayes

==== Woonsocket ====
- Bryan Berard
- Brian Boucher

† relocated from elsewhere.
