= 1977–78 NHL transactions =

The following is a list of all team-to-team transactions that have occurred in the National Hockey League during the 1977–78 NHL season. It lists what team each player has been traded to, signed by, or claimed by, and for which player(s) or draft pick(s), if applicable.

== Trades between teams ==
=== May ===
May 23, 1977	To Los Angeles Kings Randy Manery	To Atlanta Flames Ab DeMarco Jr.

=== June ===
June 14, 1977	To Philadelphia Flyers 8th-rd pick - 1977 Amateur Draft (# 136 - Clint Eccles); 9th-rd pick - 1977 Amateur Draft (# 151 - Michel Bauman); 10th-rd pick - 1977 Amateur Draft (# 159 - Dave Isherwood); 11th-rd pick - 1977 Amateur Draft (# 166 - Barry Duench)	To Buffalo Sabres cash
June 14, 1977	To Montreal Canadiens 8th-rd pick - 1977 Amateur Draft (# 137 - Keith Hendrickson); 9th-rd pick - 1977 Amateur Draft (# 152 - Barry Borrett); 10th-rd pick - 1977 Amateur Draft (# 160 - Mark Holden); 11th-rd pick - 1977 Amateur Draft (# 166 - Dan Poulin); 12th-rd pick - 1977 Amateur Draft (# 173 - Cary Farelli); 13th-rd pick - 1977 Amateur Draft (# 176 - Mark Wells); 14th-rd pick - 1977 Amateur Draft (# 179 - Jean Belisle); 15th-rd pick - 1977 Amateur Draft (# 182 - Bob Boileau)	To New York Islanders cash
June 17, 1977	To Los Angeles Kings Steve Short	To Philadelphia Flyers future considerations^{1} (Paul Evans)

1. Trade completed on November 3, 1977.

=== August ===
August, 1977 exact date unknown	To Atlanta Flames future considerations	To Detroit Red Wings Al McDonough
August 5, 1977	To Colorado Rockies Mark Suzor	To Philadelphia Flyers Barry Dean
August 9, 1977	To St. Louis Blues Dick Redmond	To Chicago Black Hawks Pierre Plante
August 17, 1977	To Detroit Red Wings rights to Ron Low; 3rd-rd pick - 1979 Amateur Draft (# 46 - Boris Fistric)	To Washington Capitals Walt McKechnie; 3rd-rd pick - 1978 Amateur Draft (# 45 - Jay Johnston); 2nd-rd pick - 1979 Amateur Draft (# 24 - Errol Rausse)
August 17, 1977	To Cleveland Barons rights to Mike Eaves	To St. Louis Blues Len Frig
August 18, 1977	To Atlanta Flames cash	To Detroit Red Wings Rick Bowness
August 18, 1977	To Montreal Canadiens 3rd-rd pick - 1979 Amateur Draft (# 44 - Guy Carbonneau)	To St. Louis Blues Jim Roberts
August 31, 1977	To Los Angeles Kings rights to Pete Stemkowski	To New York Rangers future considerations^{1} (3rd-rd pick - 1978 Amateur Draft # 45 - Dean Turner)

1. Trade completed on June 15, 1978, at the 1978 Amateur Draft.

=== September ===
September 20, 1977	To Buffalo Sabres Ron Schock	To Pittsburgh Penguins Brian Spencer
September 22, 1977	To Buffalo Sabres cash	To Colorado Rockies Rick Jodzio

=== October ===
October 1, 1977	To Washington Capitals rights to Don Awrey	To Pittsburgh Penguins Bob Paradise
October 16, 1977	To Washington Capitals 1st-rd pick - 1979 Entry Draft (MIN - # 10 - Tom McCarthy)^{1}	To Pittsburgh Penguins Hartland Monahan
October 20, 1977	To Detroit Red Wings Andre St. Laurent	To New York Islanders Michel Bergeron
October 28, 1977	To Philadelphia Flyers Blake Dunlop; 3rd-rd pick - 1978 Amateur Draft (# 37 - Gord Salt)	To Minnesota North Stars Harvey Bennett Jr.

1. Washington's first-round pick went to Minnesota as the result of a trade on October 18, 1978, that sent Dennis Maruk to Washington in exchange for this pick.

=== November ===
November 1, 1977	To Detroit Red Wings cash	To Philadelphia Flyers Terry Murray
November 1, 1977	To Toronto Maple Leafs Jerry Butler	To St. Louis Blues Inge Hammarstrom
November 2, 1977	To Los Angeles Kings Syl Apps Jr. Hartland Monahan	To Pittsburgh Penguins Gene Carr; Dave Schultz; 4th-rd pick - 1978 Amateur Draft (# 61 - Shane Pearsall)
November 4, 1977	To Vancouver Canucks Pit Martin	To Chicago Black Hawks future considerations^{1} (Murray Bannerman)
November 21, 1977	To Los Angeles Kings Larry Carriere	To Vancouver Canucks Sheldon Kannegiesser
November 23, 1977	To Cleveland Barons Randy Holt	To Chicago Black Hawks Reg Kerr
November 29, 1977	To Montreal Canadiens Pierre Larouche future considerations^{2} (rights to Peter Marsh)	To Pittsburgh Penguins Peter Lee; Peter Mahovlich

1. Trade completed on May 27, 1978.
2. Trade completed on December 15, 1977.

=== December ===
December 2, 1977	To Colorado Rockies Dennis Owchar	To Pittsburgh Penguins Tom Edur
December 2, 1977	To Detroit Red Wings Dennis Hull	To Chicago Black Hawks 4th-rd pick - 1980 Entry Draft (# 67 - Carey Wilson)
December 9, 1977	To Cleveland Barons Walt McKechnie	To Washington Capitals Bob Girard; 2nd-rd pick - 1978 Amateur Draft (# 23 - Paul MacKinnon)
December 12, 1977	To St. Louis Blues Curt Bennett; Barry Gibbs; Phil Myre	To Atlanta Flames Yves Belanger; Bob MacMillan; Dick Redmond; 2nd-rd pick - 1979 Entry Draft (# 23 - Mike Perovich)

=== January ===
January 9, 1978	To Cleveland Barons Chuck Arnason; Rick Jodzio	To Colorado Rockies Fred Ahern; Ralph Klassen
January 9, 1978	To Toronto Maple Leafs cash	To Colorado Rockies Bob Neely
January 9, 1978	To Los Angeles Kings Danny Grant	To Detroit Red Wings 3rd-rd pick - 1978 Amateur Draft (# 53 - Doug Derkson) rights to Barry Long
January 10, 1978	To Cleveland Barons Jean-Paul Parise; Jean Potvin; 4th-rd pick - 1978 Amateur Draft^{1}	To New York Islanders Wayne Merrick; Darcy Regier; 4th-rd pick - 1978 Amateur Draft^{2}
January 12, 1978	To Cleveland Barons Dennis O'Brien	To Colorado Rockies Mike Christie
January 14, 1978	To Los Angeles Kings 2nd-rd pick - 1980 Entry Draft (# 33 - Greg Terrion)	To St. Louis Blues Neil Komadoski
January 27, 1978	To St. Louis Blues cash	To Chicago Black Hawks Eddie Johnston
January 29, 1978	To Toronto Maple Leafs cash	To Vancouver Canucks Claire Alexander

1. Draft pick not exercised by Cleveland due to Barons-North Stars merger on June 14, one day prior to the 1978 NHL Amateur Draft.
2. Draft pick forfeited by the Islanders due to Barons-North Stars merger on June 14, one day prior to the 1978 NHL Amateur Draft.

=== February ===
February 19, 1978	To Minnesota North Stars Gary Smith	To Washington Capitals cash

=== March ===
March 13, 1978	To Toronto Maple Leafs Dan Maloney; 2nd-rd pick - 1980 Entry Draft (# 25 - Craig Muni)	To Detroit Red Wings Errol Thompson; 1st-rd pick - 1978 Amateur Draft (# 12 - Brent Peterson); 2nd-rd pick - 1978 Amateur Draft (# 31 - Al Jensen); 1st-rd pick - 1980 Entry Draft (# 11 - Mike Blaisdell)
March 13, 1978	To Boston Bruins cash	To Los Angeles Kings Darryl Edestrand
March 14, 1978	To Minnesota North Stars rights to Eddie Mio future considerations^{1} (Pierre Plante)	To Chicago Black Hawks Doug Hicks; 3rd-rd pick - 1980 NHL entry draft

1. Trade completed on May 4, 1978.

== Additional sources ==
- hockeydb.com - search for player and select "show trades"
- "NHL trades for 1977-1978". NHL Trade Tracker.
