= 1979–80 NHL transactions =

The following is a list of all team-to-team transactions that have occurred in the National Hockey League during the 1979–80 NHL season. It lists what team each player has been traded to, signed by, or claimed by, and for which player(s) or draft pick(s), if applicable.

== Trades between teams ==
=== May ===
| May 24, 1979 | To Atlanta Flames Curt Bennett | To St. Louis Blues Bobby Simpson |

=== June ===
| June 7, 1979 | To St. Louis Blues Blake Dunlop; Rick Lapointe | To Philadelphia Flyers Phil Myre |
| June 9, 1979 | To Winnipeg Jets 7th-rd pick - 1980 Entry Draft (# 135 - Michael Lauen) | To Pittsburgh Penguins Jets promise not to claim Kim Clackson as a priority selection in the 1979 NHL Expansion Draft |
| June 9, 1979 | To Minnesota North Stars Oilers promise not to claim Paul Shmyr as a priority selection in the 1979 NHL Expansion Draft | To Edmonton Oilers 4th-rd pick - 1979 Entry Draft (# 69 - Glenn Anderson) |
| June 9, 1979 | To Quebec Nordiques Black Hawks promise not to claim Real Cloutier as a priority selection in the 1979 NHL Expansion Draft | To Chicago Black Hawks 1st-rd pick - 1980 Entry Draft (# 3 - Denis Savard) |
| June 9, 1979 | To Montreal Canadiens 3rd-rd pick - 1980 Entry Draft (# 45 - John Newberry); 2nd-rd pick - 1981 Entry Draft (# 32 - Lars Eriksson) | To Quebec Nordiques Nordiques promise to claim Alain Cote or Danny Geoffrion rather than Marc Tardif or Richard David as a priority selection in the 1979 NHL Expansion Draft^{1} |
| June 9, 1979 | To St. Louis Blues future considerations^{2} (Ralph Klassen) | To New York Islanders Barry Gibbs; Terry Richardson |
| June 9, 1979 | To Los Angeles Kings Barry Gibbs | To New York Islanders future considerations^{3} (Tom Williams) |
| June 10, 1979 | To Minnesota North Stars 2nd-rd pick - 1982 Entry Draft (CGY - # 29 - Dave Reierson)^{4} | To St. Louis Blues Richie Hansen; Bryan Maxwell |
| June 11, 1979 | To Washington Capitals Mike Marson | To New York Islanders Steve Clippingdale |
| June 13, 1979 | To Montreal Canadiens 2nd-rd pick - 1980 Entry Draft (# 27 - Ric Nattress) | To Edmonton Oilers Dave Lumley; Dan Newman |
| June 13, 1979 | To Quebec Nordiques cash | To St. Louis Blues Hartland Monahan |
| June 15, 1979 | To Quebec Nordiques Nelson Burton | To Washington Capitals Dave Parro |
| June 28, 1979 | To Quebec Nordiques Barry Legge; Jamie Hislop | To Winnipeg Jets Barry Melrose |

1. Quebec selected Alain Cote in the 1979 NHL Expansion Draft.
2. Trade completed on June 14, 1979.
3. Trade completed on August 16, 1979.
4. Minnesota's second-round pick went to Calgary as the result of a trade on June 7, 1982 that sent Willi Plett and Calgary's fourth-round pick in 1982 NHL Entry Draft to Minnesota in exchange for Steve Christoff, Bill Nyrop and this pick.

=== July ===
| July 2, 1979 | To Colorado Rockies rights to Hardy Astrom | To New York Rangers Bill Lochead |
| July 19, 1979 | To Minnesota North Stars cash | To Vancouver Canucks Chuck Arnason |
| July 25, 1979 | To Winnipeg Jets Wayne Dillon | To New York Rangers future considerations |

=== August ===
| August, 1979 exact date unknown | To Quebec Nordiques Goran Hogosta | To New York Islanders Richard Brodeur |
| August, 1979 exact date unknown | To Atlanta Flames Paul Terbenche | To Winnipeg Jets future considerations |
| August 3, 1979 | To Detroit Red Wings Pete Mahovlich | To Pittsburgh Penguins Nick Libett |
| August 7, 1979 | To Edmonton Oilers Tom Roulston; Risto Siltanen | To St. Louis Blues Joe Micheletti |
| August 8, 1979 | To Montreal Canadiens 2nd-rd pick - 1979 Entry Draft (# 42 - Gaston Gingras); 2nd-rd pick - 1982 Entry Draft (# 32 - Kent Carlson)^{1} | To Minnesota North Stars Bill Nyrop |
| August 9, 1979 | To Minnesota North Stars 2nd-rd pick - 1979 Entry Draft (# 42 - Neal Broten); 3rd-rd pick - 1979 Entry Draft (# 63 - Kevin Maxwell) | To Edmonton Oilers Dave Semenko; 3rd-rd pick - 1979 Entry Draft (# 48 - Mark Messier) |
| August 16, 1979 | To Washington Capitals Wayne Stephenson | To Philadelphia Flyers 3rd-rd pick - 1981 Entry Draft (# 47 - Barry Tabobondung) |
| August 22, 1979^{2} | To Los Angeles Kings Andre St. Laurent; 1st-rd pick - 1980 Entry Draft (# 4 - Larry Murphy); 1st-rd pick - 1981 Entry Draft (# 2 - Doug Smith)^{3} | To Detroit Red Wings rights to Dale McCourt |
| August 22, 1979 | To Toronto Maple Leafs Reg Thomas | To Edmonton Oilers 6th-rd pick - 1981 Entry Draft (# 111 - Steve Smith) |
| August 30, 1979 | To Montreal Canadiens Denis Herron; 2nd-rd pick - 1982 Entry Draft (# 31 - Jocelyn Gauvreau) | To Pittsburgh Penguins Robert Holland; Pat Hughes |

1. The original pick was for a 2nd-rd pick in the 1980 NHL Entry Draft but was changed to a 2nd-rd pick in the 1982 NHL Entry Draft on June 11, 1980 (1980 NHL Entry Draft) day.
2. This was a compensation trade. The rights to Dale McCourt were transferred to Los Angeles as compensation to Detroit signing restricted free agent Rogatien Vachon on August 8, 1979. McCourt refused to report to Los Angeles and sued the NHL, NHLPA, Detroit and Los Angeles. The matter was resolved and McCourt stayed with Detroit.
3. Los Angeles had the option of a 2nd-rd pick in 1980 or 1st-rd pick in 1981 NHL Entry Draft. They selected in the 1981 draft.

=== September ===
| September 4, 1979 | To Detroit Red Wings Dennis Sobchuk | To Philadelphia Flyers 4th-rd pick - 1981 Entry Draft (# 65 - Dave Michayluk)^{1} |
| September 14, 1979 | To Montreal Canadiens 4th-rd pick - 1982 Entry Draft (# 69 - John DeVoe) | To Los Angeles Kings Brad Selwood; 4th-rd pick - 1982 Entry Draft (# 82 - Dave Ross) |
| September 24, 1979 | To Edmonton Oilers Jim Harrison | To Chicago Black Hawks future considerations |

1. The trade was for a conditional 3rd-rd or 4th-rd pick in 1981 NHL Entry Draft. The pick was made in the 4th-rd but the condition of the pick is unknown.

=== October ===
| October 4, 1979 | To Montreal Canadiens cash | To Winnipeg Jets Ron Wilson |
| October 5, 1979 | To Buffalo Sabres John Van Boxmeer | To Colorado Rockies Rene Robert |
| October 10, 1979 | To Atlanta Flames Garry Unger | To St. Louis Blues Ed Kea; Don Laurence; 2nd-rd pick - 1981 Entry Draft (# 36 - Hakan Nordin) |
| October 12, 1979 | To Winnipeg Jets Bud Stefanski | To New York Rangers cash future considerations |
| October 23, 1979 | To Boston Bruins Bobby Lalonde | To Atlanta Flames 4th-rd pick in 1982 Entry Draft (MIN - # 81 - Dusan Pasek)^{1} |

1. Calgary's fourth-round pick went to Minnesota as the result of a trade on June 7, 1982 that sent Steve Christoff, Bill Nyrop and Minnesota's second-round pick in 1982 NHL Entry Draft to Calgary in exchange for Willi Plett and this pick.

=== November ===
| November 2, 1979 | To Colorado Rockies Lucien DeBlois; Pat Hickey; Mike McEwen; Dean Turner future considerations^{1} (Bob Crawford) | To New York Rangers Barry Beck |
| November 6, 1979 | To Atlanta Flames Harvey Bennett Jr. | To St. Louis Blues cash |
| November 6, 1979 | To Vancouver Canucks Bruce Affleck; Gord Buynak | To St. Louis Blues cash |
| November 13, 1979 | To St. Louis Blues Blair Chapman | To Pittsburgh Penguins Bob Stewart |

1. Trade completed on January 15, 1980.

=== December ===
| December 7, 1979 | To Washington Capitals Mike Kaszycki | To New York Islanders Gord Lane |
| December 10, 1979 | To Boston Bruins Dan Newman | To Edmonton Oilers Bobby Schmautz |
| December 10, 1979 | To Minnesota North Stars 2nd-rd pick - 1981 Entry Draft (# 31 - Mike Sands) | To Vancouver Canucks Per-Olov Brasar |
| December 13, 1979 | To Toronto Maple Leafs Dave Farrish; Terry Martin | To Quebec Nordiques Reg Thomas |
| December 21, 1979 | To Vancouver Canucks Dave Logan; Harold Phillipoff | To Chicago Black Hawks Ron Sedlbauer |
| December 27, 1979 | To Toronto Maple Leafs Bob Stephenson | To Hartford Whalers Pat Boutette |
| December 29, 1979 | To Toronto Maple Leafs Pat Hickey; Wilf Paiement | To Colorado Rockies Lanny McDonald; Joel Quenneville |

=== January ===
| January 2, 1980 | To Vancouver Canucks cash | To Philadelphia Flyers Jack McIlhargey |
| January 3, 1980 | To Minnesota North Stars David Hanson | To Detroit Red Wings future considerations |
| January 3, 1980 | To Minnesota North Stars cash | To Detroit Red Wings Alex Pirus |
| January 4, 1980 | To Minnesota North Stars 2nd-rd pick - 1982 Entry Draft (MTL - # 32 - Kent Carlson)^{1} | To Vancouver Canucks Kris Manery |
| January 10, 1980 | To Toronto Maple Leafs Pat Ribble | To Chicago Black Hawks Dave Hutchison |
| January 17, 1980 | To Hartford Whalers Tom Rowe | To Washington Capitals Alan Hangsleben |

1. Minnesota's second-round pick went to Montreal as the result of a trade on August 8, 1979 that sent Bill Nyrop to Minnesota in exchange for Minnesota's second-round pick in 1979 NHL Entry Draft and second-round pick in 1980 NHL Entry Draft. The trade was later changed for this pick on June 11, 1980 (1980 NHL Entry Draft day).

=== February ===
| February 8, 1980 | To Vancouver Canucks Ivan Boldirev; Darcy Rota | To Atlanta Flames Don Lever; Brad Smith |
| February 10, 1980 | To Toronto Maple Leafs Curt Ridley | To Vancouver Canucks cash |
| February 16, 1980 | To Toronto Maple Leafs Mike Kaszycki | To Washington Capitals Pat Ribble |
| February 18, 1980 | To Toronto Maple Leafs Bill Derlago; Rick Vaive | To Vancouver Canucks Jerry Butler; Tiger Williams |
| February 25, 1980 | To Colorado Rockies Bobby Schmautz | To Edmonton Oilers Don Ashby |
| February 27, 1980 | To Hartford Whalers Bobby Hull | To Winnipeg Jets future considerations |
| February 28, 1980 | To Vancouver Canucks cash | To St. Louis Blues Bruce Affleck; Gord Buynak |

=== March ===
| March 3, 1980 | To Toronto Maple Leafs 3rd-rd pick - 1980 Entry Draft (# 43 - Fred Boimistruck) | To Colorado Rockies Walt McKechnie |
| March 10, 1980 | To Buffalo Sabres 1st-rd pick - 1982 Entry Draft (# 6 - Phil Housley) | To Los Angeles Kings Jerry Korab |
| March 10, 1980 | To Los Angeles Kings Billy Harris; Dave Lewis | To New York Islanders Butch Goring |
| March 11, 1980 | To Edmonton Oilers Don Murdoch | To New York Rangers Cam Connor; 3rd-rd pick - 1981 Entry Draft (# 50 - Peter Sundstrom) |
| March 11, 1980 | To Quebec Nordiques Ron Chipperfield | To Edmonton Oilers Ron Low |
| March 11, 1980 | To Minnesota North Stars Jim Corsi | To Edmonton Oilers future considerations |

== Additional sources ==
- hockeydb.com - search for player and select "show trades"
- "NHL trades for 1979-1980". NHL Trade Tracker.
