= John Bennett (ice hockey) =

American ice hockey player (born 1950)

- Born: January 19, 1950 (age 76) Cranston, Rhode Island, U.S.
- Height: 6 ft 3 in (191 cm)
- Weight: 185 lb (84 kg; 13 st 3 lb)
- Position: Left wing
- Shot: Left
- Played for: Philadelphia Blazers
- Playing career: 1972–1977

John Bennett (born January 19, 1950) is an American former professional ice hockey left winger. He played 34 games for the Philadelphia Blazers in 1972 and 1973. His father Harvey Bennett Sr. and three of his brothers (Harvey Bennett Jr., Curt Bennett, and Bill Bennett) are also former major league pro hockey players. Bennett played in the 1961 and 1962 Quebec International Pee-Wee Hockey Tournaments with the Cranston team.

== Career statistics ==
=== Regular season and playoffs ===
			Regular season					Playoffs
Season	Team	League	GP	G	A	Pts	PIM	GP	G	A	Pts	PIM
1969–70	Brown University	ECAC	Statistics Unavailable
1970–71	Brown University	ECAC	––	9	11	20	73	—	—	—	—	—
1971–72	Brown University	ECAC	––	11	19	30	0	—	—	—	—	—
1972–73	Roanoke Valley Rebels	EHL	4	2	5	7	5	—	—	—	—	—
1972–73	Philadelphia Blazers	WHA	34	4	6	10	18	—	—	—	—	—
1976–77	Mississauga Golden Arrows	OHASr	8	6	1	7	10	—	—	—	—	—
WHA totals			34	4	6	10	18	—	—	—	—	—
