= Mike Palmateer =

Canadian ice hockey player

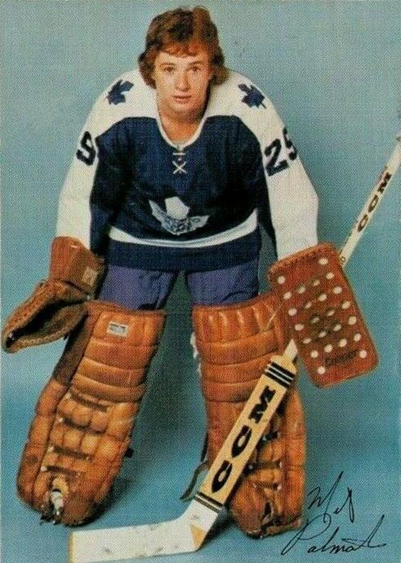
- Born: January 13, 1954 (age 72) Toronto, Ontario, Canada
- Height: 5 ft 9 in (175 cm)
- Weight: 170 lb (77 kg; 12 st 2 lb)
- Position: Goaltender
- Caught: Right
- Played for: Toronto Maple Leafs; Washington Capitals
- NHL draft: 85th overall, 1974; Toronto Maple Leafs
- WHA draft: 24th overall, 1974; Cincinnati Stingers
- Playing career: 1974–1984

Michael Scott Palmateer (born January 13, 1954) is a Canadian former professional ice hockey goalie. He played in the National Hockey League (NHL) from 1976 to 1984 for the Toronto Maple Leafs and the Washington Capitals.

== Playing career ==
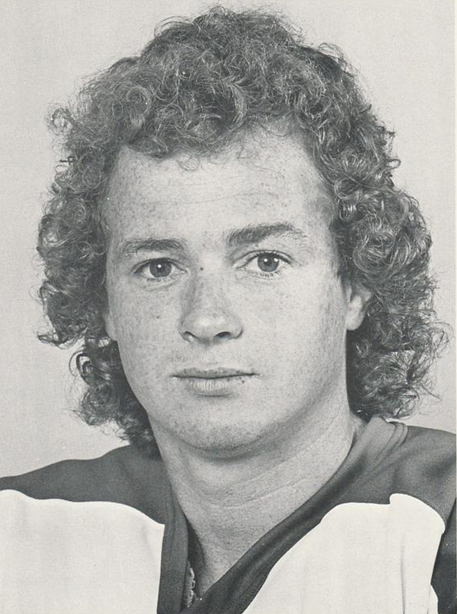
Palmateer in 1980 photo for Washington Capitals

As a youth, Palmateer played in the 1966 Quebec International Pee-Wee Hockey Tournament with the Toronto Shopsy's minor ice hockey team.

Born in Toronto, Ontario, Palmateer was drafted 85th overall by the Toronto Maple Leafs in the 1974 NHL amateur draft. Palmateer played 356 games in the NHL, posting 149 wins against 138 losses and 52 ties while compiling a 3.53 goals against average. Palmateer began his career with his hometown Toronto Maple Leafs during the 1976-77 season and served as the club's starting goaltender for the next three seasons. In his fourth season, the 1979-80 campaign, Palmateer was slowed by injuries and made just 38 appearances for the Leafs while sharing the duties with four other goalies. Off-ice drama during this season led to his departure from Toronto. After being sidelined with an ankle injury that kept him out of the crease for six weeks, Palmateer's injury was questioned by the team's management, who felt he was healthy enough to play. Palmateer, a pending free agent, could not get Maple Leafs general manager Punch Imlach to agree to a multi-year contract and their impasse ultimately led to the goaltender signing a four-year $800,000 deal with the Washington Capitals. In lieu of working out the compensation required for the signing, the two clubs agreed to a trade on June 11, 1980 that sent Palmateer's rights to Washington while the Maple Leafs acquired defensemen Robert Picard along with forward Tim Coulis. The clubs also swapped draft picks. Following the trade, Capitals general manager Max McNab declared "with a player like Palmateer, I feel we are set in goal for the next ten years."

Things did not work out that way, however. Palmateer's first year in Washington saw the netminder win 18 games for the lowly Capitals, but the following year he won just two games and spent the bulk of the season sidelined by a knee injury. Palmateer's knee problems, which seriously hampered his mobility, ultimately cost GM McNab and head coach Gary Green their jobs. Capitals owner Abe Pollin, who had committed a large sum of money towards securing Palmateer's services, was not happy to see the goalie struggling and demanded Green continue to use him despite diminishing returns. When Green protested and said that his knees were "gone" and he could no longer play him, Pollin instructed Green to "fix him" so that, at the very least, the Capitals could trade him for something in return. When Palmateer continued to falter, both McNab and Green were fired. During the off-season, David Poile was hired as the new general manager of the Capitals and just days into the job, on September 9, 1982, made his first trade by sending Palmateer back to the Maple Leafs for cash considerations.

Back in Toronto, Palmateer resumed his job as the club's starting goalie, suiting up for 53 games. The next year, his knee problems flared up again and the goalie was limited to 34 games and had his 12th knee surgery performed. With Palmateer sidelined, the bulk of the goaltending duties for the Maple Leafs fell to prospect Allan Bester, who was summoned from the Ontario Hockey League in midseason to take over the starting job. The following year, with Palmateer ready to return, the Maple Leaf management opted to go with youth in goal, and named 20-year-olds Bester and Ken Wregget their tandem. That left Palmateer as the odd man out and he was instructed by Maple Leafs general manager Gerry McNamara to stay home and collect his salary. Out of Toronto's plans, Palmateer nearly got a chance to return to the ice in February, after an injury to Edmonton Oilers star goaltender Grant Fuhr. The Oilers' director of player personnel, Barry Fraser, thought Palmateer could be a veteran option to fill in for Fuhr and contacted the Maple Leafs about a trade, but the talks never got off the ground when Fuhr's injury proved to be less serious than first thought. The season ended with Palmateer never suiting up at all.

Palmateer's final taste of NHL action - a preseason game - came with the Edmonton Oilers. However, with 14 knee operations, a year spent off the ice and the all-star tandem of Fuhr and Andy Moog already in Edmonton, his tryout was brief and he officially retired from the National Hockey League. Palmateer returned to the Maple Leafs as a scout in 2001 and worked with the club for the next 14 years. He is now up to twenty knee surgeries and a knee replacement.

== Awards and achievements ==
- 1980–81 - Set an NHL record for assists by a goaltender in one season (8).
- In 2017 Palmateer was inducted into the Aurora Sports Hall of Fame (Athlete/Hockey).

https://aurorashof.ca/inductee/mike-palmateer/

== Career statistics ==
=== Regular season and playoffs ===
			Regular season									Playoffs
Season	Team	League	GP	W	L	T	MIN	GA	SO	GAA	SV%	GP	W	L	MIN	GA	SO	GAA	SV%
1970–71	Markham Waxers	MetJHL	—	—	—	—	—	—	—	—	—	—	—	—	—	—	—	—	—
1971–72	Markham Waxers	MetJHL	—	—	—	—	—	—	—	—	—	—	—	—	—	—	—	—	—
1972–73	Toronto Marlboros	OHA	31	—	—	—	1860	87	5	2.81	—	—	—	—	—	—	—	—	—
1972–73	Toronto Marlboros	MC	—	—	—	—	—	—	—	—	—	3	2	1	180	6	0	2.00	—
1973–74	Toronto Marlboros	OHA	32	—	—	—	1895	120	0	3.80	—	—	—	—	—	—	—	—	—
1974–75	Saginaw Gears	IHL	20	—	—	—	1095	70	2	3.84	—	—	—	—	—	—	—	—	—
1974–75	Oklahoma City Blazers	CHL	16	7	5	2	841	39	1	2.78	—	5	2	3	278	18	0	3.88	—
1975–76	Oklahoma City Blazers	CHL	42	15	21	4	2272	137	1	3.61	—	3	0	2	158	8	0	3.04	—
1976–77	Toronto Maple Leafs	NHL	50	23	18	8	2877	154	4	3.21	.904	6	3	3	360	16	0	2.67	.923
1976–77	Dallas Black Hawks	CHL	3	0	2	1	171	5	0	1.75	.939	—	—	—	—	—	—	—	—
1977–78	Toronto Maple Leafs	NHL	63	34	19	9	3760	172	5	2.74	.911	13	6	7	795	32	2	2.42	.918
1978–79	Toronto Maple Leafs	NHL	58	26	21	10	3396	167	4	2.95	.909	5	2	3	298	17	0	3.42	.889
1979–80	Toronto Maple Leafs	NHL	38	16	14	3	2039	125	2	3.68	.875	1	0	1	60	7	0	7.00	.837
1980–81	Washington Capitals	NHL	49	18	19	9	2679	172	2	3.85	.878	—	—	—	—	—	—	—	—
1981–82	Washington Capitals	NHL	11	2	7	2	584	47	0	4.83	.850	—	—	—	—	—	—	—	—
1982–83	Toronto Maple Leafs	NHL	53	21	23	7	2965	197	0	3.99	.872	4	1	3	252	17	0	4.05	.907
1982–83	St. Catharines Saints	AHL	2	1	0	1	125	4	1	1.92	.938	—	—	—	—	—	—	—	—
1983–84	Toronto Maple Leafs	NHL	34	9	17	4	1831	149	0	4.88	.849	—	—	—	—	—	—	—	—
NHL totals			356	149	138	52	20,131	1183	17	3.53	.889	29	12	17	1765	89	2	3.03	.909

== Transactions ==
- Traded by the Toronto Maple Leafs with a 3rd round choice in the 1980 NHL entry draft (Torrie Robertson) to the Washington Capitals for Robert Picard, Tim Coulis and a 2nd round choice in the 1980 NHL Entry Draft (Bob McGill), June 11, 1980.
- Sold by the Washington Capitals to the Toronto Maple Leafs, September 9, 1982.
