= Brooklyn Aviators =

- City: Brooklyn, New York
- League: Federal Hockey League
- Founded: 2009
- Home arena: Aviator Sports and Events Center
- Colors: Black, red, silver
- President: Rob Miller
- Head coach: Rob Miller

Franchise history
- 2009–2011: New York Aviators
- 2011–2012: Brooklyn Aviators

Championships
- Regular season titles: 2 (2009–10 NEPHL, 2010–11 FHL)
- Playoff championships: 1 (2010 NEPHL)

The Brooklyn Aviators were a professional ice hockey team based in Brooklyn, New York. The team was a member of the Federal Hockey League and was affiliated with the ECHL's Wheeling Nailers. The Aviators played their home games at the Aviator Sports and Events Center in the Brooklyn borough of New York City.

== History ==
The franchise was founded in 2009 as the New York Aviators and began play in the North East Professional Hockey League. After the completion of the 2009–10 NEPHL season, the Aviators moved to the newly formed Federal Hockey League. The Aviators recorded a 21-game winning streak during the first season in the FHL and finished first place in the 2010–11 FHL regular season. In the 2010–11 playoffs, the Aviators advanced to the championships where they lost in game four to the Akwesasne Warriors.

The team was renamed Brooklyn Aviators for the 2011–12 season. During the 2011–12 playoffs, the Aviators lost a best-of-three series in the first round to the Danbury Whalers. The Aviators hosted game one as the fourth seed and were trailing 3–0 headed into the third period. Scoring four unanswered goals, the Aviators held a 4–3 lead until three seconds remained where the Whalers scored a disputed goal. The net was apparently not lined with the crease and play should have been whistled dead. The Aviators eventually lost game one in overtime. The series shifted to Danbury, the third seed, for the final two games. The Aviators won game two but lost 5–4 in overtime to the Whalers in game three.

The Aviators have ceased operations prior to the 2012–13 season.

== Season-by-season records ==
Season	GP	W	L	OTL	Pts	GF	GA	Regular season finish	Playoffs
North East Professional Hockey League
2009–10	30	30	0	0	60	264	59	1st	Won Championship Series, 2–0 vs. Rhode Island Storm
Federal Hockey League
2010–11	47	32	13	2	66	186	132	1st	Lost Championship Series, 1–3 vs. Akwesasne Warriors
2011–12	50	26	19	5	82	210	175	4th	Lost First Round, 1–2 vs. Danbury Whalers
