= Cranston High School East =

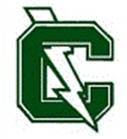

Location
- 899 Park Avenue; Cranston, Rhode Island 02910; United States
- Coordinates: 41.78016°N 71.43785°W

Information
- School type: Comprehensive Public High School
- Principal: Thomas Barbieri
- Grades: 9–12
- Enrollment: 1,591 (2016-17)
- Campus type: Urban
- Colors: Green and white
- Mascot: Thunderbolt
- Rival: Cranston West Falcons
- Feeder schools: Park View Middle School; Hugh B. Bain Middle School
- Website: Cranston East CPSED

Cranston High School East, often called East, Cranston East, or abbreviated as CHSE, is a comprehensive high school located in the central part of Cranston, Rhode Island, with over 1,500 students in grades 9-12 and 150+ faculty members. The school mascot is the Thunderbolt, and its colors are green and white.

Cranston High School East is housed in two buildings, the main building at 899 Park Avenue and the William A. Briggs Building located at 845 Park Avenue, which is where the school was originally housed. The Briggs building is home to the administrative offices of Cranston Public Schools and also served as a junior high school in the early part of the 20th century.

Cranston East was the first high school in Cranston; before Cranston West opened in 1958, the school was called simply Cranston High. Cranston High School East is ranked 44-58th within Rhode Island.

== Facilities ==
In the late 19th century, Cranston High School was built and dedicated to William Briggs. In the 1920s, a new section of the building (commonly referred to as "main") had been built because Briggs was too crowded at the time due to it being the only high school in the city. In 2007, the southeastern section of the building was rebuilt and added a few more (and much needed) classrooms in the area. It is commonly referred to as the "new wing".

== Notable alumni ==
- Curt Bennett, former professional ice hockey forward
- Harvey Bennett Jr., former professional ice hockey player
- Johnny Cooney, professional baseball player
- Frank Matano, comedian
- Vinny Pazienza, former professional boxer
- Mike Stenhouse, former outfielder, first baseman, and designated hitter in Major League Baseball
- Rudolph E. Tanzi, professor of neurology
