= Harvey Bennett Sr. =

Canadian ice hockey player (1925–2004)

- Born: July 23, 1925 Ettington, Saskatchewan, Canada
- Died: November 21, 2004 (aged 79) Cranston, Rhode Island, U.S.
- Height: 6 ft 0 in (183 cm)
- Weight: 180 lb (82 kg; 12 st 12 lb)
- Position: Goaltender
- Caught: Left
- Played for: Boston Bruins; Providence Reds
- Playing career: 1944–1959

Harvey Alexander Bennett Sr. (July 23, 1925 – November 21, 2004) was a Canadian professional ice hockey goaltender who played for the Boston Bruins of the National Hockey League. In his only season in the NHL in the 1944-45 season, he went 10-12-2 for the Bruins.

Perhaps Bennett's most famous feat was surrendering Maurice Richard's goal that established scoring 50 goals in 50 games. This goal was scored for the Bruins' nemesis Montreal Canadiens on March 18, 1945.

Bennett was inducted into the American Hockey League Hall of Fame in 2013 and the Rhode Island Hockey Hall of Fame in 2018.

== Family ==
He was born in Ettington, Saskatchewan and married Diana Helen Sullivan (youngest of nine sisters). Of his six sons, Harvey Bennett Jr., Curt Bennett, and Bill Bennett all played in the NHL. John Bennett played in the WHA, and Jimmy Bennett was a 1977 draft pick of the Atlanta Flames who played professionally in the International Hockey League with the Muskegon Mohawks and also in the old Central Hockey League with the Birmingham Bulls. His youngest son, Peter Bennett, drowned after falling through ice.
