= Bob Monahan =

American ice hockey player (1928–2020)

- Born: November 12, 1928 Providence, Rhode Island, US
- Died: January 31, 2020 (aged 91) Greenville, South Carolina, US
- Position: Defenceman
- Played for: Michigan Tech
- Playing career: 1948–1953

Robert Monahan (November 12, 1928 – January 31, 2020) was an American ice hockey defenceman who played for Michigan Tech in the 1950s.

== Career ==
Monahan began attending Michigan College of Mining and Technology in 1947. When he joined the varsity team in 1948 the team was still trying to make a name for itself and he helped the Huskies post their first winning season in a decade in his second campaign. That year saw Monahan score the first hat-trick by a defenseman in program history, a feat that has been accomplished only three times since (as of 2020). After sitting out for two seasons, Monahan returned and continued to perform well for the Huskies, being named as an AHCA First Team All-American in his final season.

After graduating Monahan worked as a sales manager for the Ethyl Corporation and later formed his own consulting company. He was inducted into the Michigan Tech Athletic Hall of Fame in 1993.

== Personal ==
Bob and his wife of 66 years, Jean, raised four children, 3 boys and a girl. Bob died in 2020 after a brief illness.

== Statistics ==
=== Regular season and playoffs ===
			Regular season					Playoffs
Season	Team	League	GP	G	A	Pts	PIM	GP	G	A	Pts	PIM
1948–49	Michigan Tech	NCAA	—	—	—	—	—	—	—	—	—	—
1949–50	Michigan Tech	NCAA	—	—	—	—	—	—	—	—	—	—
1952–53	Michigan Tech	MCHL	—	3	10	13	55	—	—	—	—	—
NCAA totals			52	17	23	40	159	—	—	—	—	—

== Awards and honors ==
Award	Year
AHCA First Team All-American	1952–53
