= North East Professional Hockey League =

US professional ice hockey league (2009-10)

- Sport: Ice hockey
- Founded: 2009
- Folded: 2010
- No. of teams: 6 (2009), finishing with 2 (2010)
- Country: United States
- Last champion: New York Aviators
- Website: nephlhockey.com

The North East Professional Hockey League (NEPHL) was a professional men's ice hockey league that had its only season in 2009–10.

== League history ==
The league was announced on July 12, 2009, via americanprohockey.com and was to consist of teams in New Hampshire, Massachusetts, and Rhode Island; with the possibility of adding a team in Danbury, Connecticut for the start of the season or the following season.

The league was originally to consist of four teams, but the New England Pharaohs and Twin City Yeti were forced into a hiatus due to a founding member having two major heart surgeries prior to the start of the season. The Boston Wings had announced entry into the league in July 2009, but then decided to fold their franchise before the season began. The Rhode Island Storm, the only founding member of the NEPHL to survive until the actual start of the season, along with the New York Aviators decided to start the season alone and as a result the Connecticut C-Dogs were quickly added as a team prior to the beginning of the 2009-2010 season.

The inaugural NEPHL season was originally slated for 44 games. This was modified for the first time to thirty games, down to twenty, and later down to fifteen games due to financial concerns from the C-Dog franchise. A playoff structure was implemented where the win less Connecticut C-Dogs would play the Rhode Island Storm in a best 2 out of 3 playoff series with all three games to be played in Rhode Island because the C-Dogs canceled their ice time at their facility in East Haven, CT.

== Fate of the league ==
On January 11, 2010, Jerry Deno announced on the C-Dogs facebook website: "The NY Aviators have taken the NEPHL Championship 2 games to none in the best of 3 vs the RI Storm. I would like to thank all of our friends and fans who attended games in RI, NY, and Ct. I would also like to announce at this time that the Rhode Island Storm and the New York Aviators will be back next season with a stronger and more stabil(sic) league. Again Thanks and see you all in November"

The NEPHL, wrought with financial problems from the day they dropped their first puck, was now down to two teams with the Connecticut C-Dogs ceasing operations after their forfeited playoff game vs. Rhode Island. The New York Aviators later applied and transferred to the newly formed Federal Hockey League The Rhode Island Storm stated that they would return to play in 2010-11 in some capacity, but needed to find a new arena. During the NEPHL playoffs, the Storm front office and the front office of the Boss Arena came to a head as a lapse of security at the arena resulted in the Storm locker room being burglarized with three players jerseys stolen. This forced the Storm's starting goalie to wear a white jersey with no logo, number or name sewn on. The Storm never resurfaced.

Shortly after the league's championship was awarded in January 2010, both the league's and the Rhode Island Storm website went inactive, and the league quietly disappeared.

On March 26, 2010 the Aviators announced that they are joining the Federal Hockey League.

== Teams ==
=== Teams competing ===
- New York Aviators (2009–2010)
- Rhode Island Storm (2009–2010)
- Connecticut C-Dogs (2009–2010)

=== Teams that were announced, but did not play ===
- Twin City Yeti (operations suspended before season began)
- New England Pharaohs (operations suspended before season began)
- Boston Wings (folded before season began)
