= Bill Bennett (ice hockey) =

American ice hockey player (born 1953)

- Born: May 31, 1953 (age 73) Warwick, Rhode Island, U.S.
- Height: 6 ft 5 in (196 cm)
- Weight: 235 lb (107 kg; 16 st 11 lb)
- Position: Left wing
- Shot: Left
- Played for: Boston Bruins; Hartford Whalers
- NHL draft: Undrafted
- Playing career: 1974–1982

William Bennett (born May 31, 1953) is an American former ice hockey left winger.

== Career ==
Bennett played 31 games in the National Hockey League for the Boston Bruins and Hartford Whalers between 1978 and 1980. After leaving the NHL, he played with the Wichita Wind, Hershey Bears, and Fort Wayne Komets. He was inducted into the Rhode Island Hockey Hall of Fame in 2024.

== Personal life ==
Bennett's father, Harvey Bennett Sr., two of his brothers, Curt Bennett and Harvey Bennett Jr., also played in the NHL. Brother, John Bennett, played in the WHA and brother, Jim Bennett, played in the IHL.

== Career statistics ==
=== Regular season and playoffs ===
			Regular season					Playoffs
Season	Team	League	GP	G	A	Pts	PIM	GP	G	A	Pts	PIM
1974–75	Waterloo Black Hawks	USHL	34	4	7	11	75	—	—	—	—	—
1975–76	Central Wisconsin Flyers	USHL	11	2	4	6	17	—	—	—	—	—
1976–77	Columbus Owls	IHL	70	27	30	57	131	7	1	2	3	2
1976–77	Rochester Americans	AHL	—	—	—	—	—	4	1	1	2	12
1977–78	Rochester Americans	AHL	67	11	19	30	107	6	0	4	4	14
1978–79	Boston Bruins	NHL	7	1	4	5	2	—	—	—	—	—
1978–79	Rochester Americans	AHL	72	33	38	71	89	—	—	—	—	—
1979–80	Hartford Whalers	NHL	24	3	3	6	63	—	—	—	—	—
1979–80	Springfield Indians	AHL	35	20	16	36	25	—	—	—	—	—
1980–81	Wichita Wind	CHL	28	6	4	10	39	9	2	1	3	68
1981–82	Hershey Bears	AHL	10	0	2	2	36	—	—	—	—	—
1981–82	Fort Wayne Komets	IHL	11	1	4	5	2	—	—	—	—	—
AHL totals			184	64	75	139	257	10	1	5	6	26
NHL totals			31	4	7	11	65	—	—	—	—	—

== See also ==
- List of family relations in the NHL
