= André St. Laurent =

Canadian ice hockey player

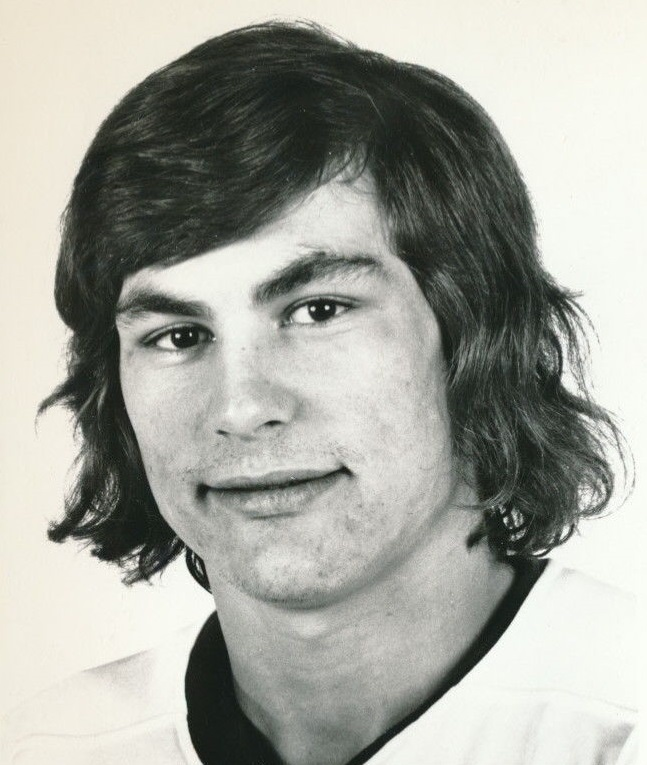
- St. Laurent in 1974
- Born: February 16, 1953 (age 72) Rouyn-Noranda, Quebec, Canada
- Height: 5 ft 10 in (178 cm)
- Weight: 180 lb (82 kg; 12 st 12 lb)
- Position: Centre
- Shot: Right
- Played for: New York Islanders; Detroit Red Wings; Los Angeles Kings; Pittsburgh Penguins; Dragons de Rouen; Bordeaux Gironde Hockey 2000
- NHL draft: 49th overall, 1973; New York Islanders
- WHA draft: 96th overall, 1973; Vancouver Blazers
- Playing career: 1973–1990

André St. Laurent (born February 16, 1953) is a Canadian former professional ice hockey forward. He played in the National Hockey League 1973 and 1983 with four teams. He also plater played several seasons in Europe, finishing his career in 1990.

== Playing career ==
Born in Rouyn-Noranda, Quebec, St. Laurent started his National Hockey League career with the New York Islanders in 1974. He also played for the Detroit Red Wings, Los Angeles Kings, and Pittsburgh Penguins. He left the NHL after the 1984 season. He played the 1985 season for the Adirondack Red Wings. In the 1985–86 and 1986–87 seasons he played for Rögle BK in Sweden and later played in France for Rouen, Clermont and Bordeaux.

== Career statistics ==
=== Regular season and playoffs ===
			Regular season					Playoffs
Season	Team	League	GP	G	A	Pts	PIM	GP	G	A	Pts	PIM
1970–71	Montreal Junior Canadiens	OHA	60	13	27	40	127	11	2	6	8	55
1971–72	Montreal Junior Canadiens	OHA	63	18	34	52	161	—	—	—	—	—
1972–73	Montreal Bleu Blanc Rouge	QMJHL	64	52	48	100	245	4	1	2	3	0
1973–74	New York Islanders	NHL	42	5	9	14	18	—	—	—	—	—
1973–74	Fort Worth Wings	CHL	32	14	19	33	53	5	2	2	4	12
1974–75	New York Islanders	NHL	78	14	27	41	60	15	2	2	4	6
1975–76	New York Islanders	NHL	67	9	17	26	56	13	1	5	6	15
1975–76	Fort Worth Texans	CHL	3	1	2	3	2	—	—	—	—	—
1976–77	New York Islanders	NHL	72	10	13	23	55	12	1	2	3	6
1977–78	New York Islanders	NHL	2	0	0	0	2	—	—	—	—	—
1977–78	Detroit Red Wings	NHL	77	31	39	70	108	7	1	1	2	4
1978–79	Detroit Red Wings	NHL	76	18	31	49	124	—	—	—	—	—
1979–80	Los Angeles Kings	NHL	77	6	24	30	88	4	1	0	1	0
1980–81	Los Angeles Kings	NHL	42	5	9	14	18	—	—	—	—	—
1980–81	Fort Worth Texans	CHL	12	1	14	15	36	—	—	—	—	—
1980–81	Houston Apollos	CHL	3	1	0	1	4	—	—	—	—	—
1981–82	Los Angeles Kings	NHL	16	2	4	6	28	—	—	—	—	—
1981–82	Pittsburgh Penguins	NHL	18	8	5	13	4	5	2	1	3	8
1981–82	New Haven Nighthawks	AHL	28	7	9	16	58	—	—	—	—	—
1982–83	Pittsburgh Penguins	NHL	70	13	9	22	105	—	—	—	—	—
1983–84	Pittsburgh Penguins	NHL	8	2	0	2	21	—	—	—	—	—
1983–84	Detroit Red Wings	NHL	19	1	3	4	17	—	—	—	—	—
1983–84	Adirondack Red Wings	AHL	50	26	43	69	129	7	4	4	8	23
1984–85	Adirondack Red Wings	AHL	35	10	23	33	68	—	—	—	—	—
1985–86	Rögle BK	SWE-2	32	17	29	46	76	—	—	—	—	—
1986–87	Rögle BK	SWE-2	12	6	6	12	14	5	1	1	2	12
1986–87	Dragons de Rouen	FRA	—	—	—	—	—	—	—	—	—	—
1987–88	Dragons de Rouen	FRA	24	16	35	51	24	—	—	—	—	—
1988–89	Clermont-Auvergne Hockey Club	FRA-2	21	43	29	72	43	—	—	—	—	—
1989–90	Bordeaux Gironde Hockey 2000	FRA	1	0	0	0	2	—	—	—	—	—
NHL totals			644	129	187	316	749	59	8	12	20	48
