= Rhode Island Storm =

- City: Kingston, Rhode Island
- League: North East Professional Hockey League
- Founded: 2009
- Home arena: Bradford R. Boss Ice Arena
- Colors: Red, White, Blue
- Owner: Ed McDonough
- General manager: Kirk McDonough

Franchise history
- 2009–2010: Rhode Island Storm

The Rhode Island Storm were a professional ice hockey team in the North East Professional Hockey League that played in the 2009–10 season. They played their home games at the Bradford R. Boss Ice Arena on the Kingston campus of the University of Rhode Island.

== Season-by-season record ==
Season	GP	W	L	OTL	Pts	Finish	Playoffs
2009–10	19	8	10	1	17	2nd of 3, NEPHL	Lost Championship Series, 0–2 vs. New York Aviators
