= 1977–78 NHL season =

National Hockey League season

- League: National Hockey League
- Sport: Ice hockey
- Duration: October 12, 1977 – May 25, 1978
- Games: 80
- Teams: 18
- TV partner(s): CBC, SRC (Canada); NHL Network (United States)

Draft
- Top draft pick: Dale McCourt
- Picked by: Detroit Red Wings

Regular season
- Season champions: Montreal Canadiens
- Season MVP: Guy Lafleur (Canadiens)
- Top scorer: Guy Lafleur (Canadiens)

Playoffs
- Playoffs MVP: Larry Robinson (Canadiens)

Stanley Cup
- Champions: Montreal Canadiens
- Runners-up: Boston Bruins

NHL seasons
- 1976–77 1978–79

The 1977–78 NHL season was the 61st season of the National Hockey League. The Montreal Canadiens won their third Stanley Cup in a row, defeating the Boston Bruins four games to two in the Stanley Cup Finals.

== League business ==
Prior to the start of the season, Clarence Campbell retired as NHL President. John Ziegler succeeded him in that capacity.

A trophy for the top defensive forward, the Frank J. Selke Trophy, made its debut this season and went to Bob Gainey, who played left wing for Montreal.

The league changed the playoff qualification format for this season. Whereas before the top three teams in every division qualified, the format was changed to guarantee the top two teams in each division a playoff spot. The last four qualifiers were from the next-best four regular-season records from teams finishing third or lower.

The 1977 NHL amateur draft was held on June 14, at the Mount Royal Hotel in Montreal, Quebec. Dale McCourt was selected first overall by the Detroit Red Wings.

Teams were required to place the last names of players on the back of all jerseys starting with this season, but Toronto Maple Leafs owner Harold Ballard initially refused, fearing that he would not be able to sell programs at his team's games. The NHL responded by threatening to levy a fine on the team in February 1978, so Ballard complied by making the letters the same color as the background they were on, which for the team's road jerseys was blue. The League threatened further sanctions, and despite playing more than one game with their "unreadable" sweaters, Ballard's Maple Leafs finally complied in earnest by making the letters white on the blue road jerseys. (Blue letter names would not come to the white home jerseys until the following year.)

Officials began wearing their surnames on the back of their sweaters instead of being identified by numbers, as they were previously. The NHL returned to using uniform numbers for officials for the 1994–95 season.

== Arena changes ==
The St. Louis Blues's home arena, St. Louis Arena, was renamed the Checkerdome after Ralston Purina purchased both the team and the arena, referencing the pet food company's checkerboard logo.

== Regular season ==
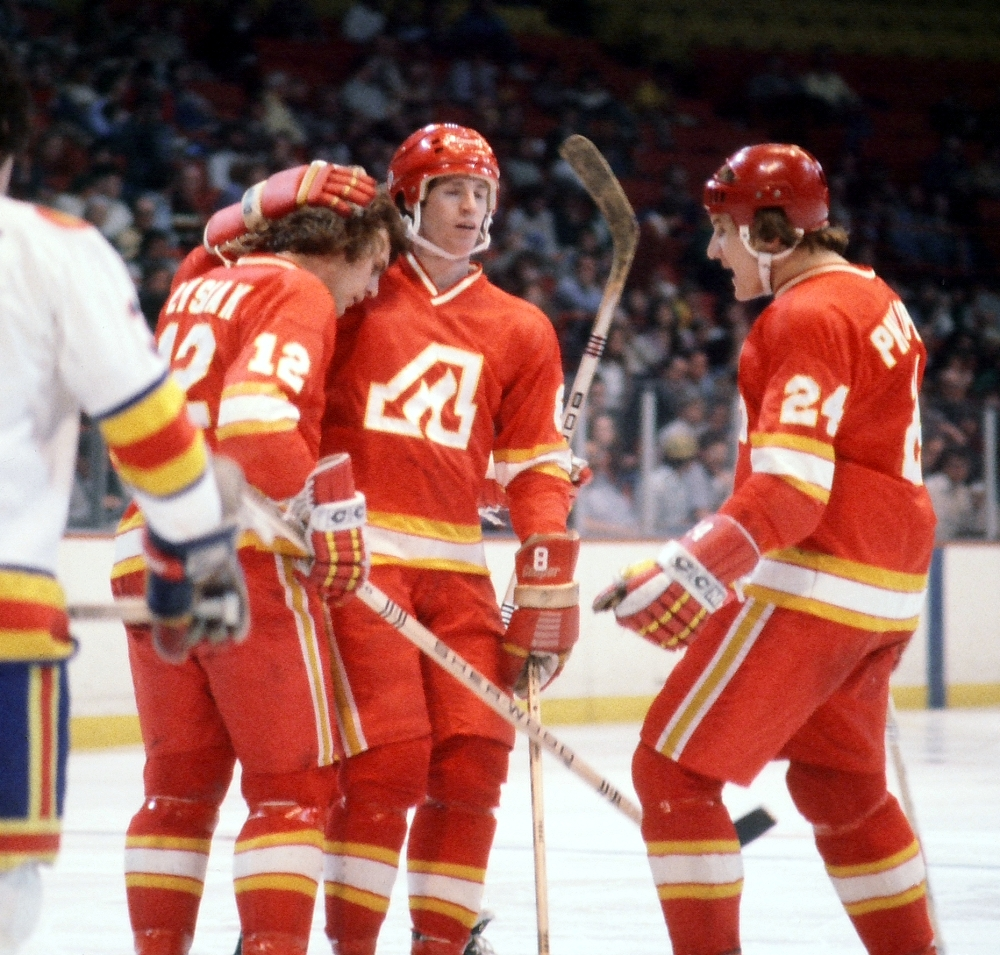
Tom Lysiak (left) celebrates a goal with Atlanta Flames teammates in a game with the Colorado Rockies in 1978

Bobby Orr sat out the season to rest his oft-injured knee in the hope that rest would allow him to return to play in 1978–79; he would return for that season, only playing in six games before retiring. However, defenseman Doug Wilson proved to be an excellent replacement for the Chicago Blackhawks.

The Detroit Red Wings made changes, adding rookie Dale McCourt and Andre St. Laurent, who led the Wings to their first playoff appearance since 1970.

On December 11, 1977, the Philadelphia Flyers' Tom Bladon became the first defenceman in NHL history to score eight points in one game. He scored four goals and four assists versus the Cleveland Barons. It was 25% of his point total for the entire season.

The Colorado Rockies qualified for the playoffs for the first time in franchise history. They would not make the playoffs again until after the team had moved to New Jersey, in 1988. The next time the playoffs came to Colorado would be the Colorado Avalanche's championship season of 1996, the franchise's first in Denver after moving from Quebec City.

=== Final standings ===
GP = Games Played, W = Wins, L = Losses, T = Ties, Pts = Points, GF = Goals For, GA = Goals Against, PIM = Penalties in minutes
Teams that qualified for the playoffs are highlighted in bold

==== Prince of Wales Conference ====
Adams Division
	GP	W	L	T	GF	GA	Pts
**Boston Bruins**	80	51	18	11	333	218	113
**Buffalo Sabres**	80	44	19	17	288	215	105
**Toronto Maple Leafs**	80	41	29	10	271	237	92
Cleveland Barons	80	22	45	13	230	325	57

Norris Division
	GP	W	L	T	GF	GA	Pts
**Montreal Canadiens**	80	59	10	11	359	183	129
**Detroit Red Wings**	80	32	34	14	252	266	78
**Los Angeles Kings**	80	31	34	15	243	245	77
Pittsburgh Penguins	80	25	37	18	254	321	68
Washington Capitals	80	17	49	14	195	321	48

==== Clarence Campbell Conference ====
Patrick Division
	GP	W	L	T	GF	GA	Pts
**New York Islanders**	80	48	17	15	334	210	111
**Philadelphia Flyers**	80	45	20	15	296	200	105
**Atlanta Flames**	80	34	27	19	274	252	87
**New York Rangers**	80	30	37	13	279	280	73

Smythe Division
	GP	W	L	T	GF	GA	Pts
**Chicago Black Hawks**	80	32	29	19	230	220	83
**Colorado Rockies**	80	19	40	21	257	305	59
Vancouver Canucks	80	20	43	17	239	320	57
St. Louis Blues	80	20	47	13	195	304	53
Minnesota North Stars	80	18	53	9	218	325	45

== Playoffs ==
For the first time in NHL history, all of the Original Six teams qualified for the Stanley Cup playoffs.

The playoffs were held in four rounds, preliminary, quarterfinals, semifinals and finals. In the preliminary round, the Detroit Red Wings was the only lower-placed team to win over the higher-placed team. The Red Wings were then defeated in five games by the first-place Montreal Canadiens. The Toronto Maple Leafs defeated the Los Angeles Kings to advance to the quarterfinals, where the Leafs upset the third-place New York Islanders in seven games, setting up an Original Six playoff against Montreal. The upsets ended there as the Canadiens swept the Leafs to advance to the finals. In the other groupings, the higher-placed team won each round, and the second-place Boston Bruins advanced to the finals against the first-place Canadiens. In the finals, the Canadiens defeated the Bruins in six games to win their third consecutive Stanley Cup.

The Colorado Rockies made their one and only playoff appearance in the preliminary round against the Philadelphia Flyers, and were swept in two games. It would take another ten years before they got to the playoffs again in New Jersey. The Chicago Black Hawks were swept in the other Original Six matchup of the playoffs, losing to Boston in the quarterfinals.

=== Playoff seeds ===
Under the new postseason format, the top two teams in each division made the playoffs, along with the four next-best regular-season records from teams in the entire league finishing third or lower. All 12 clubs then were seeded 1–12 based on regular season points, regardless of conference or division.

Note: Only teams that qualified for the playoffs are listed here.

1. Montreal Canadiens, Norris Division champions, Prince of Wales Conference regular season champions, NHL regular season champions – 129 points
2. Boston Bruins, Adams Division champions – 113 points
3. New York Islanders, Patrick Division champions, Clarence Campbell Conference regular season champions – 111 points
4. Philadelphia Flyers – 105 points (45 wins)
5. Buffalo Sabres – 105 points (44 wins)
6. Toronto Maple Leafs – 92 points
7. Atlanta Flames – 87 points
8. Chicago Black Hawks, Smythe Division champions – 83 points
9. Detroit Red Wings – 78 points
10. Los Angeles Kings – 77 points
11. New York Rangers – 73 points
12. Colorado Rockies – 59 points

=== Playoff bracket ===
The NHL used "re-seeding" instead of a fixed bracket playoff system: in each round, the highest remaining seed was matched against the lowest remaining seed, the second-highest remaining seed played the second-lowest remaining seed, and so forth.

Regardless of playoff seed, all four division winners received a bye to the Quarterfinals. Each series in the Preliminary Round was played in a best-of-three format while each series in the other three rounds were played in a best-of-seven format (scores in the bracket indicate the number of games won in each series).

Preliminary round
4	Atlanta	0
5	Detroit	2
3	Toronto	2
6	Los Angeles	0
1	Philadelphia	2
8	Colorado	0
2	Buffalo	2
7	NY Rangers	1

Quarterfinals
1	Montreal	4
8	Detroit	1
3	NY Islanders	3
6	Toronto	4
2	Boston	4
7	Chicago	0
4	Philadelphia	4
5	Buffalo	1

Semifinals
1	Montreal	4
4	Toronto	0
2	Boston	4
3	Philadelphia	1

Stanley Cup Finals
1	Montreal	4
2	Boston	2

=== Preliminary round ===
==== (1) Philadelphia Flyers vs. (8) Colorado Rockies ====
This was the first playoff series meeting between these two teams. It was the Rockies' only playoff appearance in their first eight seasons before moving to New Jersey in 1982 (including two years in Kansas City and six in Denver).

April 11	Colorado Rockies	2–3	OT	Philadelphia Flyers	Spectrum	Recap
Denis Dupere (1) – pp – 17:45		First period		11:57 – pp – Rick MacLeish (1)
No scoring		Second period		19:31 – Bobby Clarke (1)
Dave Hudson (1) – 01:48		Third period		No scoring
No scoring		First overtime period		00:23 – Mel Bridgman (1)
Doug Favell 41 saves / 44 shots		Goalie stats		Bernie Parent 16 saves / 18 shots

April 13	Philadelphia Flyers	3–1	Colorado Rockies	McNichols Sports Arena	Recap
Reggie Leach (1) – 02:41		First period	06:59 – Dennis Owchar (1)
No scoring		Second period	No scoring
Don Saleski (1) – 01:13; Bob Kelly (1) – 10:36		Third period	No scoring
Bernie Parent 16 saves / 17 shots		Goalie stats	Doug Favell 42 saves / 45 shots

Philadelphia won series 2–0

==== (2) Buffalo Sabres vs. (7) New York Rangers ====
This was the first playoff series meeting between these two teams.

April 11	New York Rangers	1–4	Buffalo Sabres	Buffalo Memorial Auditorium	Recap
No scoring		First period	16:41 – Gilbert Perrault (1)
No scoring		Second period	12:28 – Richard Martin (1)
Steve Vickers (1) – 02:35		Third period	08:33 – Jocelyn Guevremont (1); 17:50 – Gary McAdam (1)
Wayne Thomas 23 saves / 27 shots		Goalie stats	Don Edwards 24 saves / 25 shots

April 13	Buffalo Sabres	3–4	OT	New York Rangers	Madison Square Garden	Recap
Rene Robert (1) – 03:06; Derek Smith (1) – 16:29		First period		14:36 – Steve Vickers (2); 19:59 – Pat Hickey (1)
Danny Gare (1) – pp – 18:04		Second period		15:07 – pp – Ron Duguay (1)
No scoring		Third period		No scoring
No scoring		First overtime period		01:37 – Don Murdoch (1)
Don Edwards 28 saves / 32 shots		Goalie stats		John Davidson 26 saves / 29 shots

April 15	New York Rangers	1–4	Buffalo Sabres	Buffalo Memorial Auditorium	Recap
No scoring		First period	No scoring
Pat Hickey (2) – pp – 19:18		Second period	08:04 – Gilbert Perreault (2); 14:23 – pp – Craig Ramsay (1); 15:56 – Danny Gare (2)
No scoring		Third period	10:32 – Rene Robert (2)
John Davidson 38 saves / 42 shots		Goalie stats	Don Edwards 16 saves / 17 shots

Buffalo won series 2–1

==== (3) Toronto Maple Leafs vs. (6) Los Angeles Kings ====
This was the second playoff series meeting between these two teams. The only previous meeting was in the 1975 preliminary round, in which Toronto won the series 2–1.

April 11	Los Angeles Kings	3–7	Toronto Maple Leafs	Maple Leaf Gardens	Recap
No scoring		First period	06:35 – pp – Stan Weir (1); 15:53 – Jerry Butler (1)
No scoring		Second period	12:48 – Tiger Williams (1); 13:24 – Borje Salming (1)
Pete Stemkowski (1) – 09:41; Darryl Edestrand (1) – 17:52; Glenn Goldup (1) – 19:13		Third period	02:18 – George Ferguson (1); 04:48 – George Ferguson (2); 09:51 – George Ferguson (3)
Rogie Vachon 25 saves / 32 shots		Goalie stats	Mike Palmateer 23 saves / 26 shots

April 13	Toronto Maple Leafs	4–0	Los Angeles Kings	The Forum	Recap
Ron Ellis (1) – 01:12; Lanny McDonald (1) – 10:38; Jimmy Jones (1) – 15:29		First period	No scoring
No scoring		Second period	No scoring
Darryl Sittler (1) – pp – 13:15		Third period	No scoring
Mike Palmateer 21 saves / 21 shots		Goalie stats	Rogie Vachon 15 saves / 19 shots

Toronto won series 2–0

==== (4) Atlanta Flames vs. (5) Detroit Red Wings ====
This was the first playoff series between these two teams; they would not meet again in Stanley Cup play until 2004, after the Flames had relocated to Calgary. (The Flames never won a playoff series while representing Atlanta, losing all six over an eight-year period.)

For Detroit, it was their only playoff series win in the twenty years between 1967 and 1986.

April 11	Detroit Red Wings	5–3	Atlanta Flames	Omni Coliseum	Recap
Dale McCourt (1) – pp – 04:52; Errol Thompson (1) – pp – 07:05; Vaclav Nedomansky (1) – pp – 07:32; Dennis Hextall (1) – sh – 15:18		First period	No scoring
No scoring		Second period	05:26 – Guy Chouinard (1)
Andre St. Laurent (1) – en – 19:59		Third period	00:09 – Eric Vail (1); 08:07 – Dick Redmond (1)
Ron Low 26 saves / 29 shots		Goalie stats	Dan Bouchard 17 saves / 21 shots

April 13	Atlanta Flames	2–3	Detroit Red Wings	Detroit Olympia	Recap
No scoring		First period	No scoring
Tom Lysiak (1) – 06:29		Second period	12:09 – Vaclav Nedomansky (2)
Bobby Lalonde (1)		Third period	08:58 – Bill Lochead (1); 18:26 – Bill Lochead (2)
Dan Bouchard 22 saves / 25 shots		Goalie stats	Jim Rutherford 25 saves / 27 shots

Detroit won series 2–0

=== Quarterfinals ===
==== (1) Montreal Canadiens vs. (8) Detroit Red Wings ====
This was the 12th playoff series meeting between these two teams. Detroit led 7–4 in previous playoff meetings. Montreal won their most recent meeting in six games in the 1966 Stanley Cup Finals. When Detroit won game two 4–2, the Red Wings victory marked the only time in the 1978 Stanley Cup playoffs that the Canadiens lost a game on home ice.

Game 4 was the final playoff game at the Detroit Olympia.

April 17	Detroit Red Wings	2–6	Montreal Canadiens	Montreal Forum	Recap
No scoring		First period	No scoring
Bill Lochead (3) – 07:45; Dale McCourt (2) – 18:56		Second period	05:53 – Doug Jarvis (1); 06:46 – Rejean Houle (1); 14:39 – Yvan Cournoyer (1); 17:31 – Steve Shutt (1)
No scoring		Third period	03:25 – Yvan Cournoyer (2); 07:25 – Pierre Mondou (1)
Ron Low 30 saves / 36 shots		Goalie stats	Ken Dryden 22 saves / 24 shots

April 19	Detroit Red Wings	4–2	Montreal Canadiens	Montreal Forum	Recap
No scoring		First period	No scoring
Dale McCourt (3) – 18:06; Dale McCourt (4) – pp – 19:22		Second period	03:37 – pp – Larry Robinson (1); 15:19 – Yvan Cournoyer (3)
Errol Thompson (2) – 00:22; Nick Libett (1) – 19:22		Third period	No scoring
Jim Rutherford 26 saves / 28 shots		Goalie stats	Ken Dryden 32 saves / 36 shots

April 21	Montreal Canadiens	4–2	Detroit Red Wings	Detroit Olympia	Recap
Steve Shutt (2) – pp – 08:38		First period	07:54 – pp – Nick Libett (2)
No scoring		Second period	13:48 – Nick Libett (3)
Jacques Lemaire (1) – 00:30; Pierre Larouche (1) – 03:46; Yvan Cournoyer (4) – 12:38		Third period	No scoring
Ken Dryden 17 saves / 19 shots		Goalie stats	Ron Low 28 saves / 32 shots

April 23	Montreal Canadiens	8–0	Detroit Red Wings	Detroit Olympia	Recap
Doug Risebrough (1) – sh – 13:00; Bob Gainey (1) – sh – 13:24; Guy Lafleur (1) – pp – 15:51		First period	No scoring
Jacques Lemaire (2) – 01:24; Pierre Mondou (2) – pp – 05:46; Steve Shutt (3) – 07:54; Guy Lafleur (2) – 11:30		Second period	No scoring
Steve Shutt (4) – 17:37		Third period	No scoring
Ken Dryden 20 saves / 20 shots		Goalie stats	Jim Rutherford 24 saves / 32 shots

April 25	Detroit Red Wings	2–4	Montreal Canadiens	Montreal Forum	Recap
Vaclav Nedomansky (3) – 09:40		First period	00:20 – Rejean Houle (2); 11:09 – pp – Guy Lapointe (1)
Dennis Polonich (1) – 06:40		Second period	No scoring
No scoring		Third period	01:37 – pp – Doug Jarvis (2); 17:36 – Doug Jarvis (3)
Ron Low 40 saves / 44 shots		Goalie stats	Ken Dryden 21 saves / 23 shots

Montreal won series 4–1

==== (2) Boston Bruins vs. (7) Chicago Black Hawks ====
This was the sixth playoff meeting between these two teams. Boston won four of the previous five meetings. Chicago won their last series meeting 2–1 in the 1975 preliminary round.

April 17	Chicago Black Hawks	1–6	Boston Bruins	Boston Garden	Recap
Grant Mulvey (1) – pp – 15:29		First period	00:24 – Brad Park (1); 06:04 – pp – Wayne Cashman (1)
No scoring		Second period	00:21 – Peter McNab (1); 06:12 – Peter McNab (2)
No scoring		Third period	06:11 – pp – Bobby Schmautz (1); 17:58 – Terry O'Reilly (1)
Tony Esposito 35 saves / 41 shots		Goalie stats	Ron Grahame 24 saves / 25 shots

April 19	Chicago Black Hawks	3–4	OT	Boston Bruins	Boston Garden	Recap
Doug Hicks (1) – pp – 05:41; Stan Mikita (1) – 18:48		First period		12:03 – Don Marcotte (1)
Bob Murray (1) – 19:13		Second period		16:59 – pp – Wayne Cashman (2)
No scoring		Third period		05:17 – Rick Middleton (1)
No scoring		First overtime period		01:50 – Terry O'Reilly (2)
Tony Esposito 20 saves / 24 shots		Goalie stats		Ron Grahame 9 saves / 12 shots

April 21	Boston Bruins	4–3	OT	Chicago Black Hawks	Chicago Stadium	Recap
John Wensink (1) – 13:01; John Wensink (2) – 15:49		First period		No scoring
No scoring		Second period		15:43 – pp – Stan Mikita (2)
Terry O'Reilly (3) – 01:14		Third period		13:04 – Grant Mulvey (2); 19:33 – Cliff Koroll (1)
Peter McNab (3) – 10:17		First overtime period		No scoring
Gerry Cheevers 26 saves / 29 shots		Goalie stats		Tony Esposito 26 saves / 30 shots

April 23	Boston Bruins	5–2	Chicago Black Hawks	Chicago Stadium	Recap
Peter McNab (4) – 00:51; Terry O'Reilly (4) – pp – 06:14; Peter McNab (5) – 08:15; Brad Park (2) – 11:40		First period	No scoring
Brad Park (3) – 19:39		Second period	09:59 – pp – Stan Mikita (3)
No scoring		Third period	17:55 – Ted Bulley (1)
Gerry Cheevers 12 saves / 14 shots		Goalie stats	Tony Esposito 17 saves / 22 shots

Boston won series 4–0

==== (3) New York Islanders vs. (6) Toronto Maple Leafs ====
This was the first playoff series meeting between these two teams.

Lanny McDonald scored the game-winning goal at 4:13 of overtime in game seven to win the series for the Maple Leafs.

April 17	Toronto Maple Leafs	1–4	New York Islanders	Nassau Coliseum	Recap
No scoring		First period	07:58 – Mike Kaszycki (1); 14:09 – Bob Nystrom (1); 16:39 – Mike Bossy (1)
Darryl Sittler (2) – pp – 12:48		Second period	14:06 – Wayne Merrick (1)
No scoring		Third period	No scoring
Mike Palmateer 23 saves / 27 shots		Goalie stats	Glenn Resch 29 saves / 30 shots

April 19	Toronto Maple Leafs	2–3	OT	New York Islanders	Nassau Coliseum	Recap
Ian Turnbull (1) – pp – 13:03		First period		16:28 – pp – Clark Gillies (1)
No scoring		Second period		No scoring
George Ferguson (4) – 09:41		Third period		03:24 – Bob Bourne (1)
No scoring		First overtime period		02:50 – Mike Bossy (2)
Mike Palmateer 37 saves / 40 shots		Goalie stats		Glenn Resch 28 saves / 30 shots

April 21	New York Islanders	0–2	Toronto Maple Leafs	Maple Leaf Gardens	Recap
No scoring		First period	No scoring
No scoring		Second period	14:37 – Ron Ellis (2)
No scoring		Third period	05:37 – Ian Turnbull (2)
Glenn Resch 21 saves / 23 shots		Goalie stats	Mike Palmateer 19 saves / 19 shots

April 23	New York Islanders	1–3	Toronto Maple Leafs	Maple Leaf Gardens	Recap
No scoring		First period	No scoring
Bob Nystrom (2) – pp – 10:54		Second period	03:53 – Borje Salming (2); 04:09 – Stan Weir (2)
No scoring		Third period	04:49 – Pat Boutette (1)
Glenn Resch 25 saves / 28 shots		Goalie stats	Mike Palmateer 31 saves / 32 shots

April 25	Toronto Maple Leafs	1–2	OT	New York Islanders	Nassau Coliseum	Recap
No scoring		First period		No scoring
Ian Turnbull (3) – 01:10		Second period		13:39 – Denis Potvin (1)
No scoring		Third period		No scoring
No scoring		First overtime period		08:02 – Bob Nystrom (3)
Mike Palmateer 38 saves / 40 shots		Goalie stats		Glenn Resch 29 saves / 30 shots

April 27	New York Islanders	2–5	Toronto Maple Leafs	Maple Leaf Gardens	Recap
No scoring		First period	02:49 – Darryl Sittler (3); 03:40 – pp – Jack Valiquette (1); 11:03 – pp – Lanny McDonald (2); 12:53 – Stan Weir (3)
No scoring		Second period	04:36 – Pat Boutette (2)
Clark Gillies (2) – 04:51; Bob Bourne (2) – pp – 17:53		Third period	No scoring
Glenn Resch 3 saves / 7 shots Billy Smith 16 saves / 17 shots		Goalie stats	Mike Palmateer 35 saves / 37 shots

April 29	Toronto Maple Leafs	2–1	OT	New York Islanders	Nassau Coliseum	Recap
No scoring		First period		05:18 – Denis Potvin (2)
Ian Turnbull (4) – 03:42		Second period		No scoring
No scoring		Third period		No scoring
Lanny McDonald (3) – 04:13		First overtime period		No scoring
Mike Palmateer 22 saves / 23 shots		Goalie stats		Glenn Resch 25 saves / 27 shots

Toronto won series 4–3

==== (4) Philadelphia Flyers vs. (5) Buffalo Sabres ====
This was the second playoff series meeting between these two teams. Philadelphia won the only previous meeting in six games in the 1975 Stanley Cup Finals.

April 17	Buffalo Sabres	1–4	Philadelphia Flyers	Spectrum	Recap
Terry Martin (1) – 06:34		First period	06:19 – pp – Rick MacLeish (2)
No scoring		Second period	01:08 – Bob Kelly (2); 06:13 – Rick MacLeish (3)
No scoring		Third period	01:28 – Bill Barber (1)
Don Edwards 24 saves / 28 shots		Goalie stats	Bernie Parent 24 saves / 25 shots

April 19	Buffalo Sabres	2–3	Philadelphia Flyers	Spectrum	Recap
Richard Martin (2) – pp – 11:58		First period	07:16 – pp – Bill Barber (2)
Danny Gare (3) – pp – 14:20		Second period	04:09 – Andre Dupont (1); 10:31 – Rick MacLeish (4)
No scoring		Third period	No scoring
Don Edwards 31 saves / 34 shots		Goalie stats	Bernie Parent 20 saves / 22 shots

April 22	Philadelphia Flyers	1–4	Buffalo Sabres	Buffalo Memorial Auditorium	Recap
Rick MacLeish (5) – pp – 08:36		First period	No scoring
No scoring		Second period	09:18 – Gary McAdam (2)
No scoring		Third period	00:43 – Gilbert Perreault (3); 03:17 – Derek Smith (2); 12:25 – Danny Gare (4)
Bernie Parent 29 saves / 33 shots		Goalie stats	Don Edwards 20 saves / 21 shots

April 23	Philadelphia Flyers	4–2	Buffalo Sabres	Buffalo Memorial Auditorium	Recap
Bob Kelly (3) – 05:56; Ross Lonsberry (1) – pp – 08:02; Rick MacLeish (6) – 14:13		First period	15:13 – Craig Ramsay (2)
No scoring		Second period	No scoring
Bill Barber (3) – 14:59		Third period	16:57 – Craig Ramsay (3)
Bernie Parent 31 saves / 33 shots		Goalie stats	Don Edwards 23 saves / 27 shots

April 25	Buffalo Sabres	2–4	Philadelphia Flyers	Spectrum	Recap
No scoring		First period	13:43 – pp – Bobby Clarke (2)
Terry Martin (2) – 10:53		Second period	11:07 – Paul Holmgren (1); 14:34 – Ross Lonsberry (2)
Derek Smith (3) – 13:04		Third period	06:59 – Don Saleski (2)
Don Edwards 22 saves / 26 shots		Goalie stats	Bernie Parent 26 saves / 28 shots

Philadelphia won series 4–1

=== Semifinals ===
==== (1) Montreal Canadiens vs. (4) Toronto Maple Leafs ====
This was the 14th playoff series meeting between these two teams. Toronto lead 7–6 in previous meetings. Toronto won the most recent meeting in six games in the 1967 Stanley Cup Finals.

May 2	Toronto Maple Leafs	3–5	Montreal Canadiens	Montreal Forum	Recap
Ron Ellis (3) – 02:25		First period	00:23 – Serge Savard (1); 17:06 – Yvan Cournoyer (5); 19:13 – Jacques Lemaire (3)
Ian Turnbull (5) – 08:27		Second period	No scoring
Pat Boutette (3) – 14:32		Third period	03:14 – Yvan Cournoyer (6); 08:54 – Guy Lafleur (3)
Mike Palmateer 31 saves / 36 shots		Goalie stats	Ken Dryden 12 saves / 15 shots

May 4	Toronto Maple Leafs	2–3	Montreal Canadiens	Montreal Forum	Recap
No scoring		First period	04:01 – pp – Larry Robinson (2); 06:46 – Guy Lafleur (4)
Ian Turnbull (6) – 05:47; Dan Maloney (1) – pp – 08:35		Second period	15:32 – pp – Guy Lafleur (5)
No scoring		Third period	No scoring
Mike Palmateer 23 saves / 26 shots		Goalie stats	Ken Dryden 21 saves / 23 shots

May 6	Montreal Canadiens	6–1	Toronto Maple Leafs	Maple Leaf Gardens	Recap
Steve Shutt (5) – pp – 01:34; Rick Chartraw (1) – 13:09; Yvon Lambert (1) – 17:00		First period	No scoring
Guy Lafleur (6) – 11:02; Jacques Lemaire (4) – 12:26		Second period	08:50 – George Ferguson (5)
Guy Lafleur (7) – 05:08		Third period	No scoring
Ken Dryden 23 saves / 24 shots		Goalie stats	Mike Palmateer 33 saves / 39 shots

May 9	Montreal Canadiens	2–0	Toronto Maple Leafs	Maple Leaf Gardens	Recap
Jacques Lemaire (5) – 07:21		First period	No scoring
Steve Shutt (6) – pp – 02:15		Second period	No scoring
No scoring		Third period	No scoring
Ken Dryden 23 saves / 23 shots		Goalie stats	Mike Palmateer 27 saves / 29 shots

Montreal won series 4–0

==== (2) Boston Bruins vs. (3) Philadelphia Flyers ====
This was the fourth playoff series meeting between these two teams. Philadelphia won two of the previous three meetings. This was the third straight semifinal meeting following Philadelphia's win in five games in 1976 and Boston's four-game sweep last season.

Game five was Fred Shero's last game as head coach of the Flyers, and Bernie Parent's final playoff game.

May 2	Philadelphia Flyers	2–3	OT	Boston Bruins	Boston Garden	Recap
Reggie Leach (2) – pp – 15:24		First period		07:45 – Jean Ratelle (1)
No scoring		Second period		15:28 – Don Marcotte (2)
Bobby Clarke (3) – 05:02		Third period		No scoring
No scoring		First overtime period		01:43 – Rick Middleton (2)
Bernie Parent 22 saves / 25 shots		Goalie stats		Gerry Cheevers 21 saves / 23 shots

May 4	Philadelphia Flyers	5–7	Boston Bruins	Boston Garden	Recap
Orest Kindrachuk (1) – pp – 17:48		First period	06:01 – pp – Bobby Schmautz (2); 08:55 – Rick Middleton (3); 12:31 – pp – Wayne Cashman (3); 19:51 – Jean Ratelle (2)
Bill Barber (4) – 05:22; Rick MacLeish (7) – 08:06; Bob Dailey (1) – 19:20		Second period	02:36 – Bobby Schmautz (3)
Bobby Clarke (4) – 01:41		Third period	14:24 – Rick Middleton (4); 16:39 – Gregg Sheppard (1)
Bernie Parent 26 saves / 33 shots		Goalie stats	Gerry Cheevers 20 saves / 25 shots

May 7	Boston Bruins	1–3	Philadelphia Flyers	Spectrum	Recap
Brad Park (4) – pp – 13:42		First period	10:36 – André Dupont (2)
No scoring		Second period	11:56 – Orest Kindrachuk (2)
No scoring		Third period	03:32 – Bill Barber (5)
Ron Grahame 21 saves / 24 shots		Goalie stats	Bernie Parent 24 saves / 25 shots

May 9	Boston Bruins	4–2	Philadelphia Flyers	Spectrum	Recap
Bobby Schmautz (4) – 06:20; Don Marcotte (3) – 15:43		First period	No Scoring
Wayne Cashman (4) – 13:57		Second period	16:26 – Jimmy Watson (1)
Bobby Schmautz (5) – en – 19:25		Third period	06:34 – pp – Orest Kindrachuk (3)
Gerry Cheevers 28 saves / 30 shots		Goalie stats	Bernie Parent 12 saves / 15 shots

May 11	Philadelphia Flyers	3–6	Boston Bruins	Boston Garden	Recap
No Scoring		First period	17:04 – Mike Milbury (1)
Bill Barber (6) – 02:56; Orest Kindrachuk (4) – 13:40; Orest Kindrachuk (5) – 13:51		Second period	04:29 – pp – Brad Park (5); 17:58 – Bobby Schmautz (6)
No Scoring		Third period	06:18 – Don Marcotte (4); 12:22 – Peter McNab (6); 18:56 – en – Jean Ratelle (3)
Bernie Parent 27 saves / 32 shots		Goalie stats	Gerry Cheevers 21 saves / 24 shots

Boston won series 4–1

=== Stanley Cup Finals ===
This was the 17th playoff series (and the last Finals) meeting between these two teams. Montreal led 14–2 in previous meetings. This was a rematch of last year's Stanley Cup Finals, in which Montreal won in a four-game sweep.

May 13	Boston Bruins	1–4	Montreal Canadiens	Montreal Forum	Recap
Brad Park (6) – pp – 02:31		First period	04:31 – pp – Guy Lafleur (8); 09:53 – pp – Yvon Lambert (2)
No scoring		Second period	13:54 – Steve Shutt (7)
No scoring		Third period	03:55 – Yvan Cournoyer (7)
Gerry Cheevers 23 saves / 27 shots		Goalie stats	Ken Dryden 15 saves / 16 shots

May 16	Boston Bruins	2–3	OT	Montreal Canadiens	Montreal Forum	Recap
No scoring		First period		No scoring
Brad Park (7) – 03:57		Second period		07:00 – Steve Shutt (8)
Rick Smith (1) – 15:48		Third period		12:12 – Bob Gainey (2)
No scoring		First overtime period		13:09 – Guy Lafleur (9)
Gerry Cheevers 32 saves / 35 shots		Goalie stats		Ken Dryden 30 saves / 32 shots

May 18	Montreal Canadiens	0–4	Boston Bruins	Boston Garden	Recap
No scoring		First period	00:59 – Gary Doak (1); 05:11 – Rick Middleton (5)
No scoring		Second period	No scoring
No scoring		Third period	02:54 – Peter McNab (7); 15:39 – Terry O'Reilly (5)
Ken Dryden 32 saves / 36 shots		Goalie stats	Gerry Cheevers 16 saves / 16 shots

May 21	Montreal Canadiens	3–4	OT	Boston Bruins	Boston Garden	Recap
Doug Risebrough (2) – 03:26		First period		00:25 – Gregg Sheppard (2)
Larry Robinson (3) – 07:00		Second period		No scoring
Guy Lafleur (10) – 19:27		Third period		09:19 – Peter McNab (8); 13:20 – Brad Park (8)
No scoring		First overtime period		06:22 – Bobby Schmautz (7)
Ken Dryden 20 saves / 24 shots		Goalie stats		Gerry Cheevers 27 saves / 30 shots

May 23	Boston Bruins	1–4	Montreal Canadiens	Montreal Forum	Recap
No scoring		First period	07:46 – Larry Robinson (4); 11:10 – pp – Pierre Mondou (3)
No scoring		Second period	13:04 – pp Pierre Larouche (2); 18:42 – Jacques Lemaire (6)
Don Marcotte (5) – pp – 11:22		Third period	No scoring
Gerry Cheevers 21 saves / 25 shots Ron Grahame 5 saves / 5 shots		Goalie stats	Ken Dryden 29 saves / 30 shots

May 25	Montreal Canadiens	4–1	Boston Bruins	Boston Garden	Recap
Steve Shutt (9) – 07:01; Mario Tremblay (1) – 09:20		First period	04:05 – pp – Brad Park (9)
Mario Tremblay (2) – 13:37; Rejean Houle (3) – 17:46		Second period	No scoring
No scoring		Third period	No scoring
Ken Dryden 15 saves / 16 shots		Goalie stats	Gerry Cheevers 20 saves / 24 shots

Montreal won series 4–2

== Awards ==
The league introduced the Frank J. Selke trophy this season. It rewards the forward judged to be the best at defensive abilities.

1978 NHL awards
Prince of Wales Trophy: (Wales Conference regular season champion)	Montreal Canadiens
Clarence S. Campbell Bowl: (Campbell Conference regular season champion)	New York Islanders
Art Ross Trophy: (Top scorer, regular season)	Guy Lafleur, Montreal Canadiens
Bill Masterton Memorial Trophy: (Perseverance, sportsmanship, and dedication)	Butch Goring, Los Angeles Kings
Calder Memorial Trophy: (Top first-year player)	Mike Bossy, New York Islanders
Conn Smythe Trophy: (Most valuable player, playoffs)	Larry Robinson, Montreal Canadiens
Frank J. Selke Trophy: (Best defensive forward)	Bob Gainey, Montreal Canadiens
Hart Memorial Trophy: (Most valuable player, regular season)	Guy Lafleur, Montreal Canadiens
Jack Adams Award: (Best coach)	Bobby Kromm, Detroit Red Wings
James Norris Memorial Trophy: (Best defenceman)	Denis Potvin, New York Islanders
Lady Byng Memorial Trophy: (Excellence and sportsmanship)	Butch Goring, Los Angeles Kings
Lester B. Pearson Award: (Outstanding player, regular season)	Guy Lafleur, Montreal Canadiens
Vezina Trophy: (Goaltender(s) of team(s) with best goaltending record)	Ken Dryden & Michel Larocque, Montreal Canadiens

=== All-Star teams ===
First Team	Position	Second Team
Ken Dryden, Montreal Canadiens	G	Don Edwards, Buffalo Sabres
Denis Potvin, New York Islanders	D	Larry Robinson, Montreal Canadiens
Brad Park, Boston Bruins	D	Borje Salming, Toronto Maple Leafs
Bryan Trottier, New York Islanders	C	Darryl Sittler, Toronto Maple Leafs
Guy Lafleur, Montreal Canadiens	RW	Mike Bossy, New York Islanders
Clark Gillies, New York Islanders	LW	Steve Shutt, Montreal Canadiens

== Player statistics ==
=== Scoring leaders ===
GP = Games Played, G = Goals, A = Assists, Pts = Points, PIM = Penalties In Minutes

Player	Team	GP	G	A	Pts	PIM
Guy Lafleur	Montreal Canadiens	78	60	72	132	26
Bryan Trottier	New York Islanders	77	46	77	123	46
Darryl Sittler	Toronto Maple Leafs	80	45	72	117	100
Jacques Lemaire	Montreal Canadiens	76	36	61	97	14
Denis Potvin	New York Islanders	80	30	64	94	81
Mike Bossy	New York Islanders	73	53	38	91	6
Terry O'Reilly	Boston Bruins	77	29	61	90	211
Gilbert Perreault	Buffalo Sabres	79	41	48	89	20
Bobby Clarke	Philadelphia Flyers	71	21	68	89	83
Lanny McDonald	Toronto Maple Leafs	74	47	40	87	54
Wilf Paiement	Colorado Rockies	80	31	56	87	114

Source: NHL.

=== Leading goaltenders ===
Note: GP = Games played; Min = Minutes played; GA = Goals against; GAA = Goals against average; W = Wins; L = Losses; T = Ties; SO = Shutouts

Player	Team	GP	MIN	GA	GAA	W	L	T	SO
Ken Dryden	Montreal Canadiens	52	3071	105	2.05	37	7	7	5
Bernie Parent	Philadelphia Flyers	49	2923	108	2.22	29	6	13	7
Gilles Gilbert	Boston Bruins	25	1326	56	2.53	15	6	2	2
Chico Resch	N.Y. Islanders	45	2637	112	2.55	28	9	7	3
Tony Esposito	Chicago Black Hawks	64	3840	168	2.63	28	22	14	5
Don Edwards	Buffalo Sabres	72	4209	185	2.64	38	16	17	5
Billy Smith	N.Y. Islanders	38	2154	95	2.65	20	8	8	2
Michel Larocque	Montreal Canadiens	30	1729	77	2.67	22	3	4	1
Mike Palmateer	Toronto Maple Leafs	63	3760	172	2.74	34	19	9	5
Dan Bouchard	Atlanta Flames	58	3340	153	2.75	25	12	19	2

=== Other statistics ===
Plus-minus

- Guy Lafleur, Montreal Canadiens

== Coaches ==
=== Patrick Division ===
- Atlanta Flames: Fred Creighton
- New York Islanders: Al Arbour
- New York Rangers: Jean-Guy Talbot
- Philadelphia Flyers: Fred Shero and Bob McCammon

=== Adams Division ===
- Boston Bruins: Don Cherry
- Buffalo Sabres: Marcel Pronovost
- Cleveland Barons: Jack Evans
- Toronto Maple Leafs: Roger Neilson

=== Norris Division ===
- Detroit Red Wings: Bobby Kromm
- Los Angeles Kings: Ron Stewart
- Montreal Canadiens: Scotty Bowman
- Pittsburgh Penguins: Johnny Wilson
- Washington Capitals: Tom McVie

=== Smythe Division ===
- Chicago Black Hawks: Bob Pulford
- Colorado Rockies: Patrick Kelly
- Minnesota North Stars: Andre Beaulieu and Lou Nanne
- St. Louis Blues: Leo Boivin and Barclay Plager
- Vancouver Canucks: Orland Kurtenbach

== Debuts ==
The following is a list of players of note who played their first NHL game in 1977–78 (listed with their first team, asterisk(*) marks debut in playoffs):

- Doug Wilson, Chicago Black Hawks
- Barry Beck, Colorado Rockies
- Dale McCourt, Detroit Red Wings
- Vaclav Nedomansky, Detroit Red Wings
- Dave Taylor, Los Angeles Kings
- Mike Bossy, New York Islanders
- Ron Duguay, New York Rangers
- Glen Hanlon, Vancouver Canucks
- Murray Bannerman, Vancouver Canucks
- Robert Picard, Washington Capitals

Nedomansky began his major professional career in the World Hockey Association.

== Last games ==
The following is a list of players of note that played their last game in the NHL in 1977–78 (listed with their last team):

- Johnny Bucyk, Boston Bruins
- Eddie Johnston, Chicago Black Hawks
- Jim Neilson, Cleveland Barons
- Dennis Hull, Detroit Red Wings
- Ed Giacomin, Detroit Red Wings
- Bill Goldsworthy, New York Rangers
- Dallas Smith, New York Rangers
- Ken Hodge, New York Rangers
- Rod Gilbert, New York Rangers
- Gary Dornhoefer, Philadelphia Flyers
- Derek Sanderson, Pittsburgh Penguins
- Claude Larose, St. Louis Blues
- Bob Plager, St. Louis Blues
- Jim Roberts, St. Louis Blues
- Red Berenson, St. Louis Blues
- Cesare Maniago, Vancouver Canucks

NOTE: Goldsworthy and Neilson would finish their major professional careers in the World Hockey Association.

== Broadcasting ==
Hockey Night in Canada on CBC Television televised Saturday night regular season games and Stanley Cup playoff games.

In the U.S., this was the third season that NHL games aired in national broadcast syndication under the NHL Network package. Starting in the 1978 playoffs, the NHL Network began simulcasting most games with HNIC/CBC.

== See also ==
- List of Stanley Cup champions
- 1977 NHL amateur draft
- 1977–78 NHL transactions
- 31st National Hockey League All-Star Game
- National Hockey League All-Star Game
- 1977–78 WHA season
- Lester Patrick Trophy
- 1977 in sports
- 1978 in sports
