= 1979–80 NHL season =

National Hockey League season

- League: National Hockey League
- Sport: Ice hockey
- Duration: October 9, 1979 – May 24, 1980
- Games: 80
- Teams: 21
- TV partner(s): CBC, SRC (Canada); Hughes, ESPN, USA, CBS (Note: CBS only televised game six of the Stanley Cup Final.) (United States)

Draft
- Top draft pick: Rob Ramage
- Picked by: Colorado Rockies

Regular season
- Season champions: Philadelphia Flyers
- Season MVP: Wayne Gretzky (Oilers)
- Top scorer: Marcel Dionne (Kings)

Playoffs
- Playoffs MVP: Bryan Trottier (Islanders)

Stanley Cup
- Champions: New York Islanders
- Runners-up: Philadelphia Flyers

NHL seasons
- 1978–79 1980–81

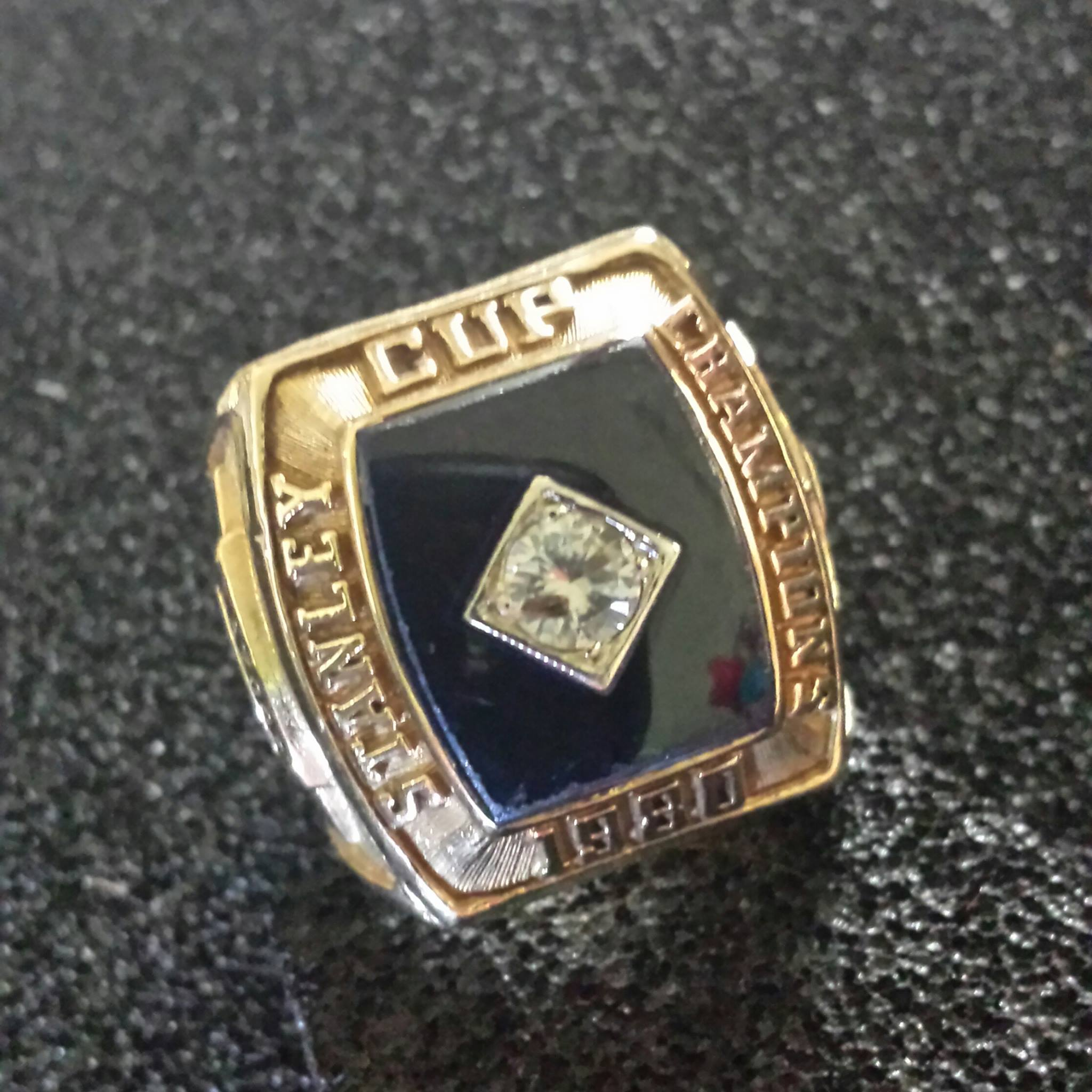
NHL Championship Ring, 1980

The 1979–80 NHL season was the 63rd season of the National Hockey League. This season saw the addition of four teams from the disbanded World Hockey Association as expansion franchises. The Edmonton Oilers, Winnipeg Jets, New England Whalers (later renamed "Hartford Whalers" at the insistence of the Boston Bruins), and Quebec Nordiques joined the NHL, bringing the total to 21 teams. The other two WHA teams (Birmingham Bulls and Cincinnati Stingers) were paid to fold.

The New York Islanders won their first Stanley Cup, defeating the Philadelphia Flyers in six games, in the Final.

The season also marked the eighth and final season for the Flames in Atlanta before the franchise relocated to Calgary. The NHL would return to the Georgia capital in 1999 with the Thrashers, but that team would ultimately relocate away from Atlanta as well becoming the second (and current) incarnation of the Winnipeg Jets.

The collapse of the WHA also saw the much hyped super-star rookie Wayne Gretzky come to the NHL with the Edmonton Oilers. Gretzky would tie Marcel Dionne for the scoring lead with 137 points and capture the Hart Memorial Trophy as the most valuable player while Dionne took home the Art Ross Trophy as the leading scorer by virtue of having scored two more goals. Gretzky aside, many players made their debut in the NHL this season, both due to the WHA merger and to a change in the rules for the Entry Draft allowing eighteen- and nineteen-year-olds to be drafted for the first time; no fewer than seven Hall of Famers (Gretzky, Ray Bourque, Mark Messier, Mike Gartner, Michel Goulet, Mark Howe, and an undrafted Joe Mullen) debuted this season, along with numerous other perennial stars.

The big story of the regular season was the record-breaking undefeated streak compiled by the Philadelphia Flyers. After starting the season with a 5–2 win over the New York Islanders and a 9–2 loss to the Atlanta Flames, the Flyers did not lose again for nearly three months, earning at least one point in every game between a 4–3 win over Toronto on October 14, 1979, and a 4–2 win over Buffalo on January 6, 1980, earning a 35-game record of 25–0–10. This stands as the longest undefeated streak in North American professional sports history.

== League business ==
=== Expansion/NHL–WHA merger ===
The 1979 expansion or NHL–WHA merger was the culmination of several years of negotiations between the NHL and the World Hockey Association (WHA). The result of the negotiations was that the WHA folded, and four of its six surviving teams - the Edmonton Oilers, New England Whalers, Quebec Nordiques, and Winnipeg Jets – entered the NHL as expansion teams prior to the start of the 1979–80 season. This ended the seven-year existence of the WHA and re-established the NHL as the sole major league in North American professional ice hockey. Upon entering the NHL, the New England Whalers were renamed the Hartford Whalers at the insistence of the NHL's Boston Bruins, since their respective home cities, Hartford, Connecticut and Boston, Massachusetts, are both in the larger New England region.

Although popularly called a merger, the NHL refused to recognize the WHA's records or history as being any part of its own. It explicitly treated the arrival of the WHA teams not as a merger, but rather as an expansion consisting of four new teams which happened to have identical or similar names to these former WHA teams. Notably, and in stark contrast to amalgamations consummated within the preceding decade in American football and basketball, the existing NHL teams were allowed to reclaim players to which they held NHL "rights" from the former WHA clubs without compensation, with the caveat that each of the new NHL franchises were permitted to protect two goaltenders and two skaters on their WHA rosters. An expansion draft was then held to re-fill the former WHA teams' rosters.

=== Divisional affiliations become irrelevant ===
With the league expansion from 17 to 21 teams, both the regular-season schedule and playoff format were set without regard to divisional affiliation. Under the new regular-season scheduling formula, each team played each of the other 20 teams four times in the year, twice at home and twice on the road.

The playoffs were expanded from a 12-team to a 16-team tournament, with the four division winners plus the next 12 teams with the best records in the league qualifying. The 16 qualifying teams were then seeded 1 through 16 based on regular season points, with divisional rankings ignored. Division winners also were no longer granted any byes during the first round. The top team played the 16th team in the first round, and so on. In subsequent rounds, matchups were similarly arranged, with the top remaining seed against the lowest remaining seed, and so on. The preliminary round was changed from a best-of-three format to a best-of-five format, while the other three rounds remained in a best-of-seven format.

If the five worst teams were to be in the same five-team division, the winner of this division would have qualified for the playoffs despite having the fifth worst season record. Except for that unlikely possibility, the divisional affiliations were irrelevant and had no effect on playoff qualification or seeding. This regular-season-scheduling and playoff format lasted for two seasons until the divisions were realigned prior to the 1981–82 season to better reflect their geographic locations and reduce travel costs.

=== Entry draft ===
The 1979 NHL entry draft was held on August 9, 1979, at the Queen Elizabeth Hotel in Montreal, Quebec. The name of the draft was changed from "Amateur Draft" to "Entry Draft" due to new rules allowing players who had previously played professionally to be drafted. This was made to facilitate the absorption of former WHA players. Rob Ramage was selected first overall by the Colorado Rockies.

=== Rule changes ===
In August 1979, John Ziegler, the NHL president, announced that protective helmets were made mandatory for all NHL players. "The introduction of the helmet rule will be an additional safety factor", he said. The only exception were for players who signed their pro contracts prior to June 1, 1979. Those players under the exception who chose not to wear a helmet also had to sign a waiver form, if they so desired. At the time of the rule change, about 70% of NHLers were wearing helmets already. The first player to wear protective headgear on a regular basis was George Owen of the Boston Bruins in the 1928–29 season. Prior to that, the only time protective headgear was worn was to temporarily protect injuries. Craig MacTavish, while playing for the St. Louis Blues, was the last helmetless player, retiring after the 1996–97 season.

== Arena changes ==
- The Detroit Red Wings moved from Olympia Stadium to Joe Louis Arena on December 27, 1979.
- The Hartford Whalers began the season at Springfield Civic Center in Springfield, Massachusetts before returning to the team's original WHA home, Hartford Civic Center in Hartford, Connecticut on January 17, 1980. The team had been using Springfield Civic Center as a temporary home after the Hartford Civic Center's roof collapsed in January 1978.
- The other three former WHA teams, the Edmonton Oilers, Quebec Nordiques, and Winnipeg Jets, continued to play at Northlands Coliseum, Colisée de Québec, and Winnipeg Arena, respectively.

== Regular season ==
For the four previous seasons, the Boston Bruins had owned first place in the Adams Division. This season saw the Buffalo Sabres dethrone them. The New York Islanders finished first overall in the NHL the previous season with 116 points, but lost in the playoffs semifinals to the upstart New York Rangers. This season saw them fall considerably in the standings as they finished fifth overall with 91 points, a full 25 points below last year's finish. On the other hand, the Philadelphia Flyers improved by 21 points from the previous season. Their 35-game undefeated streak (25–0–10) propelled them to the best record in the NHL with 116 points.

All four expansion teams finished poorly with records below .500. The Hartford Whalers fared the best with 73 points and the Winnipeg Jets tied the Colorado Rockies for last overall with 51 points. Hartford (14th overall) and Edmonton (16th overall) qualified for the playoffs, but both teams were swept 3 games to 0 in their respective first-round playoff series.

=== Final standings ===
Note: GP = Games played, W = Wins, L = Losses, T = Ties, Pts = Points, GF = Goals for, GA = Goals against, PIM = Penalties in minutes
Note: Teams that qualified for the playoffs are highlighted in bold

League standings
R		Div	GP	W	L	T	GF	GA	Pts
1	**p – Philadelphia Flyers**	PTK	80	48	12	20	327	254	116
2	**y – Buffalo Sabres**	ADM	80	47	17	16	318	201	110
3	**x – Montreal Canadiens**	NRS	80	47	20	13	328	240	107
4	**Boston Bruins**	ADM	80	46	21	13	310	234	105
5	**New York Islanders**	PTK	80	39	28	13	281	247	91
6	**Minnesota North Stars**	ADM	80	36	28	16	311	253	88
7	**x – Chicago Black Hawks**	SMY	80	34	27	19	241	250	87
8	**New York Rangers**	PTK	80	38	32	10	308	284	86
9	**Atlanta Flames**	PTK	80	35	32	13	282	269	83
10	**St. Louis Blues**	SMY	80	34	34	12	266	278	80
11	**Toronto Maple Leafs**	ADM	80	35	40	5	304	327	75
12	**Los Angeles Kings**	NRS	80	30	36	14	290	313	74
13	**Pittsburgh Penguins**	NRS	80	30	37	13	251	303	73
14	**Hartford Whalers**	NRS	80	27	34	19	303	312	73
15	**Vancouver Canucks**	SMY	80	27	37	16	256	281	70
16	**Edmonton Oilers**	SMY	80	28	39	13	301	322	69
17	Washington Capitals	PTK	80	27	40	13	261	293	67
18	Detroit Red Wings	NRS	80	26	43	11	268	306	63
19	Quebec Nordiques	ADM	80	25	44	11	248	313	61
20	Winnipeg Jets	SMY	80	20	49	11	214	314	51
21	Colorado Rockies	SMY	80	19	48	13	234	308	51

Divisions: ADM – Adams, NRS – Norris, PTK – Patrick, SMY – Smythe

bold – The top 16 teams in the league qualified for the playoffs, regardless of division or conference.
x – Won division; y – Won Conference (and division); p – Won Presidents' Trophy (and conference and division)

==== Prince of Wales Conference ====
Adams Division
	GP	W	L	T	GF	GA	Pts
**Buffalo Sabres**	80	47	17	16	318	201	110
**Boston Bruins**	80	46	21	13	310	234	105
**Minnesota North Stars**	80	36	28	16	311	253	88
**Toronto Maple Leafs**	80	35	40	5	304	327	75
Quebec Nordiques	80	25	44	11	248	313	61

Norris Division
	GP	W	L	T	GF	GA	Pts
**Montreal Canadiens**	80	47	20	13	328	240	107
**Los Angeles Kings**	80	30	36	14	290	313	74
**Pittsburgh Penguins**	80	30	37	13	251	303	73
**Hartford Whalers**	80	27	34	19	303	312	73
Detroit Red Wings	80	26	43	11	268	306	63

==== Clarence Campbell Conference ====
Patrick Division
	GP	W	L	T	GF	GA	Pts
**Philadelphia Flyers**	80	48	12	20	327	254	116
**New York Islanders**	80	39	28	13	281	247	91
**New York Rangers**	80	38	32	10	308	284	86
**Atlanta Flames**	80	35	32	13	282	269	83
Washington Capitals	80	27	40	13	261	293	67

Smythe Division
	GP	W	L	T	GF	GA	Pts
**Chicago Black Hawks**	80	34	27	19	241	250	87
**St. Louis Blues**	80	34	34	12	266	278	80
**Vancouver Canucks**	80	27	37	16	256	281	70
**Edmonton Oilers**	80	28	39	13	301	322	69
Winnipeg Jets	80	20	49	11	214	314	51
Colorado Rockies	80	19	48	13	234	308	51

== Playoffs ==
=== Bracket ===
Under the new postseason format, the top 16 teams in the league made the playoffs, and were seeded 1–16, regardless of division or conference. The NHL used "re-seeding" instead of a fixed bracket playoff system: in each round, the highest remaining seed played against the lowest remaining seed, the second-highest remaining seed faced the second-lowest remaining seed, and so forth.

In the preliminary round, teams competed in a best-of-five series. In the other three rounds, teams competed in a best-of-seven series (scores in the bracket indicate the number of games won in each series).

Preliminary Round
1	Philadelphia	3
16	Edmonton	0
2	Buffalo	3
15	Vancouver	1
3	Montreal	3
14	Hartford	0
4	Boston	3
13	Pittsburgh	2
5	NY Islanders	3
12	Los Angeles	1
6	Minnesota	3
11	Toronto	0
7	Chicago	3
10	St. Louis	0
8	NY Rangers	3
9	Atlanta	1

Quarterfinals
1	Philadelphia	4
8	NY Rangers	1
2	Buffalo	4
7	Chicago	0
3	Montreal	3
6	Minnesota	4
4	Boston	1
5	NY Islanders	4

Semifinals
1	Philadelphia	4
4	Minnesota	1
2	Buffalo	2
3	NY Islanders	4

Stanley Cup Finals
1	Philadelphia	2
3	NY Islanders	4

== Awards ==
1980 NHL awards
Prince of Wales Trophy (Wales Conference regular season champion)	Buffalo Sabres
Clarence S. Campbell Bowl (Campbell Conference regular season champion)	Philadelphia Flyers
Art Ross Trophy (Top scorer, regular season)	Marcel Dionne, Los Angeles Kings
Bill Masterton Memorial Trophy (Perseverance, sportsmanship, and dedication)	Al MacAdam, Minnesota North Stars
Calder Memorial Trophy (Top first-year player)	Ray Bourque, Boston Bruins
Conn Smythe Trophy (Most valuable player, playoffs)	Bryan Trottier, New York Islanders
Frank J. Selke Trophy (Best defensive forward)	Bob Gainey, Montreal Canadiens
Hart Memorial Trophy (Most valuable player, regular season)	Wayne Gretzky, Edmonton Oilers
Jack Adams Award (Best coach)	Pat Quinn, Philadelphia Flyers
James Norris Memorial Trophy (Best defenceman)	Larry Robinson, Montreal Canadiens
Lady Byng Memorial Trophy (Excellence and sportsmanship)	Wayne Gretzky, Edmonton Oilers
Lester B. Pearson Award (Outstanding player, regular season)	Marcel Dionne, Los Angeles Kings
Vezina Trophy (Goaltender(s) of team(s) with best goaltending record)	Don Edwards & Bob Sauve, Buffalo Sabres

=== All-Star teams ===
First team	Position	Second team
Tony Esposito, Chicago Black Hawks	G	Don Edwards, Buffalo Sabres
Larry Robinson, Montreal Canadiens	D	Borje Salming, Toronto Maple Leafs
Ray Bourque, Boston Bruins	D	Jim Schoenfeld, Buffalo Sabres
Marcel Dionne, Los Angeles Kings	C	Wayne Gretzky, Edmonton Oilers
Guy Lafleur, Montreal Canadiens	RW	Danny Gare, Buffalo Sabres
Charlie Simmer, Los Angeles Kings	LW	Steve Shutt, Montreal Canadiens

== Player statistics ==
=== Scoring leaders ===
Note: GP = Games played; G = Goals; A = Assists; Pts = Points

Player	Team	GP	G	A	Pts	PIM
Marcel Dionne	Los Angeles Kings	80	53	84	137	32
Wayne Gretzky	Edmonton Oilers	79	51	86	137	21
Guy Lafleur	Montreal Canadiens	74	50	75	125	12
Gilbert Perreault	Buffalo Sabres	80	40	66	106	57
Mike Rogers	Hartford Whalers	80	44	61	105	10
Bryan Trottier	New York Islanders	78	42	62	104	68
Charlie Simmer	Los Angeles Kings	64	56	45	101	65
Blaine Stoughton	Hartford Whalers	80	56	44	100	16
Darryl Sittler	Toronto Maple Leafs	73	40	57	97	62
Blair MacDonald	Edmonton Oilers	80	46	48	94	6
Bernie Federko	St. Louis Blues	79	38	56	94	24

Source: NHL.

=== Leading goaltenders ===
Note: GP = Games played; Min = Minutes played; GA = Goals against; GAA = Goals against average; W = Wins; L = Losses; T = Ties; SO = Shutouts

Player	Team	GP	MIN	GA	GAA	W	L	T	SO
Bob Sauve	Buffalo Sabres	32	1880	74	2.36	20	8	4	4
Denis Herron	Montreal Canadiens	34	1909	80	2.51	25	3	3	0
Don Edwards	Buffalo Sabres	49	2920	125	2.57	27	9	12	2
Pete Peeters	Philadelphia Flyers	40	2373	108	2.73	29	5	5	1
Gilles Gilbert	Boston Bruins	33	1933	88	2.73	20	9	3	1
Gerry Cheevers	Boston Bruins	42	2479	116	2.81	24	11	7	4
Billy Smith	N.Y. Islanders	38	2114	104	2.95	15	14	7	2
Tony Esposito	Chicago Black Hawks	69	4140	205	2.97	31	22	16	6
Glenn Resch	N.Y. Islanders	45	2606	132	3.04	23	14	6	3
Gilles Meloche	Minnesota North Stars	54	3141	160	3.06	27	20	5	1

=== Other statistics ===
- Plus-minus leader: Jim Schoenfeld, Buffalo Sabres

== Coaches ==
=== Patrick Division ===
- Atlanta Flames: Al MacNeil
- New York Islanders: Al Arbour
- New York Rangers: Fred Shero
- Philadelphia Flyers: Pat Quinn
- Washington Capitals: Gary Green

=== Adams Division ===
- Boston Bruins: Fred Creighton and Harry Sinden
- Buffalo Sabres: Scotty Bowman
- Minnesota North Stars: Glen Sonmor
- Quebec Nordiques: Jacques Demers
- Toronto Maple Leafs: Floyd Smith, Dick Duff and Punch Imlach

=== Norris Division ===
- Detroit Red Wings: Bobby Kromm and Ted Lindsay
- Hartford Whalers: Don Blackburn
- Los Angeles Kings: Bob Berry
- Montreal Canadiens: Bernie Geoffrion and Claude Ruel
- Pittsburgh Penguins: Johnny Wilson

=== Smythe Division ===
- Chicago Black Hawks: Eddie Johnston
- Colorado Rockies: Don Cherry
- Edmonton Oilers: Glen Sather
- St. Louis Blues: Barclay Plager and Red Berenson
- Vancouver Canucks: Harry Neale
- Winnipeg Jets: Tom McVie and Bill Sutherland

== Milestones ==
=== Debuts ===
The following is a list of players of note who played their first NHL game in 1979–80 (listed with their first team, asterisk(*) marks debut in playoffs):

- Bob Gould, Atlanta Flames
- Kent Nilsson §, Atlanta Flames
- Paul Reinhart, Atlanta Flames
- Pekka Rautakallio §, Atlanta Flames
- Pat Riggin §, Atlanta Flames
- Brad McCrimmon, Boston Bruins
- Craig MacTavish, Boston Bruins
- Ray Bourque, Boston Bruins
- Mike Ramsey, Buffalo Sabres
- Rob McClanahan, Buffalo Sabres
- Keith Brown, Chicago Black Hawks
- Rich Preston §, Chicago Black Hawks
- Terry Ruskowski §, Chicago Black Hawks
- Darryl Sutter, Chicago Black Hawks
- Rob Ramage §, Colorado Rockies
- John Ogrodnick, Detroit Red Wings
- Mike Foligno, Detroit Red Wings
- Jim Korn, Detroit Red Wings
- Kevin Lowe, Edmonton Oilers
- Mark Messier §, Edmonton Oilers
- Wayne Gretzky §, Edmonton Oilers
- John Garrett §, Hartford Whalers
- Gordie Roberts §, Hartford Whalers
- Mark Howe §, Hartford Whalers
- Mike Rogers §, Hartford Whalers
- Mark Hardy, Los Angeles Kings
- Jay Wells, Los Angeles Kings
- Curt Giles, Minnesota North Stars,
- Craig Hartsburg §, Minnesota North Stars
- Tom McCarthy, Minnesota North Stars
- Chris Nilan, Montreal Canadiens
- Keith Acton, Montreal Canadiens
- Gaston Gingras §, Montreal Canadiens
- Rick Meagher, Montreal Canadiens
- Richard Brodeur §, New York Islanders
- Ken Morrow, New York Islanders
- Duane Sutter, New York Islanders
- Brian Propp, Philadelphia Flyers
- Michel Goulet §, Quebec Nordiques
- Jamie Hislop §, Quebec Nordiques
- Real Cloutier §, Quebec Nordiques
- Mike Liut §, St. Louis Blues
- Joe Mullen*, St. Louis Blues
- Laurie Boschman, Toronto Maple Leafs
- Rick Vaive §, Vancouver Canucks
- Mike Gartner §, Washington Capitals
- Dave Christian, Winnipeg Jets

Players marked with § previously started their major professional career in the World Hockey Association.

=== Last games ===
The following is a list of players of note that played their last game in the NHL in 1979–80 (listed with their last team):

- Curt Bennett, Atlanta Flames
- Paul Henderson, Atlanta Flames
- Gerry Cheevers, Boston Bruins
- Dave Schultz, Buffalo Sabres
- Keith Magnuson, Chicago Black Hawks
- Stan Mikita, Chicago Black Hawks
- Cliff Koroll, Chicago Black Hawks
- Gary Croteau, Colorado Rockies
- Tom Webster, Detroit Red Wings
- Dave Dryden, Edmonton Oilers
- Bill Flett, Edmonton Oilers
- Al Hamilton, Edmonton Oilers
- Gordie Howe, Hartford Whalers (The last player to be born in the 1920s and the last player to have played in the 1940s)
- Bobby Hull, Hartford Whalers (The last player to be born in the 1930s)
- Andre Lacroix, Hartford Whalers
- Syl Apps Jr., Los Angeles Kings
- Barry Gibbs, Los Angeles Kings
- Randy Manery, Los Angeles Kings
- Jocelyn Guevremont, New York Rangers
- Dale Tallon, Pittsburgh Penguins
- Pierre Plante, Quebec Nordiques
- Carl Brewer, Toronto Maple Leafs
- Dennis Hextall, Washington Capitals
- Gary Smith, Winnipeg Jets

== Broadcasting ==
Hockey Night in Canada on CBC Television televised Saturday night regular season games and Stanley Cup playoff games.

In the U.S., the league dissolved the NHL Network, the national broadcast syndication package that aired games from the 1975–76 through the 1978–79 seasons. The fledgling cable networks ESPN and UA-Columbia (later known as the USA Network) each signed agreements to broadcast slates of regular season games. The Hughes Television Network, the NHL Network's former distributor, also signed a deal to syndicate a schedule of Thursday night regular season games, selected playoff games, and the first five games of the 1980 Stanley Cup Final. CBS then agreed to televise game six of the Cup Final. That would be the last NHL game to air on U.S. network television until NBC televised the 1990 All-Star Game, as the league remained on national cable television for the rest of the 1980s.

== See also ==
- List of Stanley Cup champions
- 1979–80 NHL transactions
- 1979 NHL entry draft
- 1979 NHL expansion draft
- 32nd National Hockey League All-Star Game
- National Hockey League All-Star Game
- World Hockey Association
- List of WHA seasons
- Lester Patrick Trophy
- Ice hockey at the 1980 Winter Olympics
- 1979 in sports
- 1980 in sports
