= Curt Bennett =

Canadian-born American ice hockey player

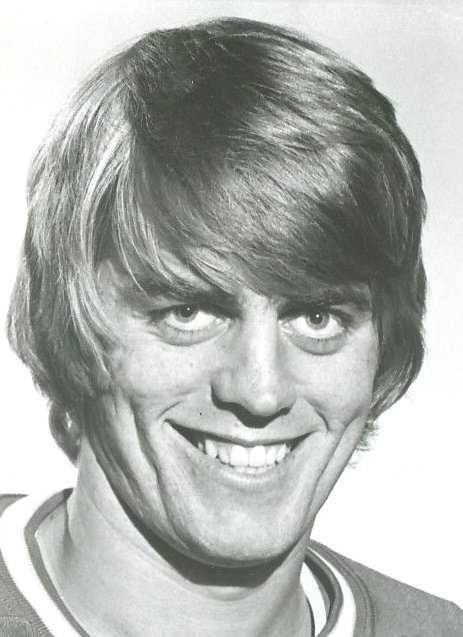
- Born: March 27, 1948 (age 77) Regina, Saskatchewan, Canada
- Height: 6 ft 3 in (191 cm)
- Weight: 195 lb (88 kg; 13 st 13 lb)
- Position: Center
- Shot: Left
- Played for: St. Louis Blues; New York Rangers; Atlanta Flames
- National team: United States
- NHL draft: 16th overall, 1968; St. Louis Blues
- Playing career: 1970–1982

Curt Alexander Bennett (born March 27, 1948) is a Canadian-born American former professional ice hockey forward, who played in the National Hockey League as well as for the United States national ice hockey team in the 1970s.

== Biography ==
=== Early life ===
Bennett came from a family of hockey players. His father Harvey Bennett, Sr. and two of his brothers (Harvey Bennett Jr. and Bill Bennett) also played in the NHL. His nephew Mac Bennett was selected in the 2009 NHL entry draft (79th overall by the Montreal Canadiens).

Bennett played in the 1961 Quebec International Pee-Wee Hockey Tournament with a team representing Cranston High School East in Cranston, Rhode Island. He was drafted by the St. Louis Blues with the 16th pick in the 1968 NHL entry draft and joined the Blues in 1971 after three very successful seasons with the Brown University men's hockey team as a defenseman. Bennett is a member of the Brown University Athletic Hall of Fame, holding the school records for goals by a defenseman in a game (7), season and career. He graduated with a degree in Russian Studies from Brown, where he was also a captain of the men's tennis team and nominated for a Rhodes scholarship.

At one point, Bennett was married to Susan Bennett who later provided the voice of the Apple assistant "Siri".

=== Playing career ===
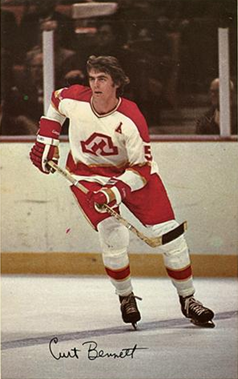
Curt Bennett of Atlanta Flames in 1972

Bennett appeared in four NHL games in his rookie season before becoming a regular player for the Blues in the 1972 Stanley Cup playoffs. He was traded to the New York Rangers during the off-season. After 16 games with the Rangers he was dealt to the expansion Atlanta Flames where he became one of their premier forwards. Bennett provided leadership, defensive skills (he frequently guarded the opposing team's star player) and toughness that a young team needed and represented the Flames in the 1975 and 1976 NHL All Star game after scoring a career-high 65 points in the 1975–1976 NHL season. He served as one of the assistant captains on the United States team in the inaugural 1976 Canada Cup tournament. He struggled in the following two NHL seasons. He returned to the Blues along with Phil Myre and Barry Gibbs from the Flames for Bob MacMillan, Dick Redmond, Yves Bélanger and a second‐round selection in the 1979 NHL entry draft (23rd overall–Mike Perovich) on December 12, 1977. Bennett spent the next two seasons with the Blues and during those years played for the US national team at the 1978 and 1979 Ice Hockey World Championship tournaments. In the summer of 1979, he was traded back to the Flames where he played a final 21 games in 1979/80, scoring just one goal.

Bennett ended his NHL career with 334 points in 580 games. He was the first American to reach the 30 goal plateau in a season.

=== Post career ===
Bennett chose not go with the Flames when the team relocated to Calgary in 1980. Instead, he emigrated to Nikko, Japan to be a player/coach (along with his brother Harvey) for the Furukawa Denko club. While in Japan, Bennett filed television reports and wrote a number of articles for Goal magazine about his experience living in Japan and the local ice hockey culture. He had previous journalistic experience from working as a part-time Atlanta sportscaster during his career with the Flames and had also served as a national television color commentator during the 1977 Stanley Cup playoffs. He and Harvey both retired from hockey in 1982 after two years with Furukawa.

After moving back to Atlanta, he became involved in commercial real estate and continued his work with the NHL Players' Association to help players transition to life after hockey. In 1992-93, he was an assistant coach for the International Hockey League Atlanta Knights and led a group of local businessmen working to bring NHL hockey back to Atlanta.

In 2000, he moved to Maui where he owns a company that designs and builds water features both in the Hawaiian Islands and on the U.S. mainland.

== Awards and honors ==
- Played in NHL All-Star game (1975,1976)

| Award | Year |
|---|---|
| All-ECAC Hockey Second Team | 1968–69 |
| All-ECAC Hockey First Team | 1969–70 |
| AHCA East All-American | 1969–70 |
| Inducted into RI Hockey Hall of Fame | 2018 |

== Career statistics ==
=== Regular season and playoffs ===
| | | | Regular season | | | | | Playoffs |
| Season | Team | League | GP | G | A | Pts | PIM | GP | G | A | Pts | PIM |
|---|---|---|---|---|---|---|---|---|---|---|---|---|
| 1965–66 | Cranston High School East | HS-RI | — | — | — | — | — | — | — | — | — | — |
| 1966–67 | Cranston High School East | HS-RI | — | — | — | — | — | — | — | — | — | — |
| 1967–68 | Brown University | ECAC | 24 | 15 | 28 | 43 | 34 | — | — | — | — | — |
| 1968–69 | Brown University | ECAC | 22 | 9 | 20 | 29 | 36 | — | — | — | — | — |
| 1969–70 | Brown University | ECAC | 24 | 26 | 37 | 63 | 22 | — | — | — | — | — |
| 1970–71 | St. Louis Blues | NHL | 4 | 2 | 0 | 2 | 0 | 2 | 0 | 0 | 0 | 0 |
| 1970–71 | Kansas City Blues | CHL | 63 | 19 | 23 | 42 | 63 | — | — | — | — | — |
| 1971–72 | St. Louis Blues | NHL | 31 | 3 | 5 | 8 | 30 | 10 | 0 | 0 | 0 | 12 |
| 1971–72 | Denver Spurs | WHL | 32 | 13 | 19 | 32 | 52 | — | — | — | — | — |
| 1972–73 | New York Rangers | NHL | 16 | 0 | 1 | 1 | 11 | — | — | — | — | — |
| 1972–73 | Atlanta Flames | NHL | 52 | 18 | 17 | 35 | 9 | — | — | — | — | — |
| 1973–74 | Atlanta Flames | NHL | 71 | 17 | 24 | 41 | 34 | 4 | 0 | 1 | 1 | 34 |
| 1974–75 | Atlanta Flames | NHL | 80 | 31 | 33 | 64 | 40 | — | — | — | — | — |
| 1975–76 | Atlanta Flames | NHL | 80 | 34 | 31 | 65 | 61 | 2 | 0 | 0 | 0 | 4 |
| 1976–77 | Atlanta Flames | NHL | 76 | 22 | 25 | 47 | 36 | 3 | 1 | 0 | 1 | 7 |
| 1977–78 | Atlanta Flames | NHL | 25 | 3 | 7 | 10 | 10 | — | — | — | — | — |
| 1977–78 | St. Louis Blues | NHL | 50 | 7 | 17 | 24 | 54 | — | — | — | — | — |
| 1978–79 | St. Louis Blues | NHL | 74 | 14 | 19 | 33 | 62 | — | — | — | — | — |
| 1979–80 | Atlanta Flames | NHL | 21 | 1 | 3 | 4 | 0 | — | — | — | — | — |
| 1979–80 | Birmingham Bulls | CHL | 7 | 3 | 0 | 3 | 14 | — | — | — | — | — |
| 1980–81 | Furukawa Electric | JPN | 20 | 10 | 10 | 20 | — | — | — | — | — | — |
| 1981–82 | Furukawa Electric | JPN | 20 | 11 | 19 | 30 | — | — | — | — | — | — |
| NHL totals | | | 580 | 152 | 182 | 334 | 347 | 21 | 1 | 1 | 2 | 57 |

=== International ===
| Year | Team | Event | GP | G | A | Pts | PIM |
|---|---|---|---|---|---|---|---|
| 1976 | United States | CC | 5 | 0 | 3 | 3 | 0 |
| 1978 | United States | WC | 10 | 3 | 0 | 3 | 0 |
| 1979 | United States | WC | 8 | 0 | 1 | 1 | 2 |
| Senior totals | | | 23 | 3 | 4 | 7 | 2 |
