= Harvey Bennett Jr. =

American ice hockey player

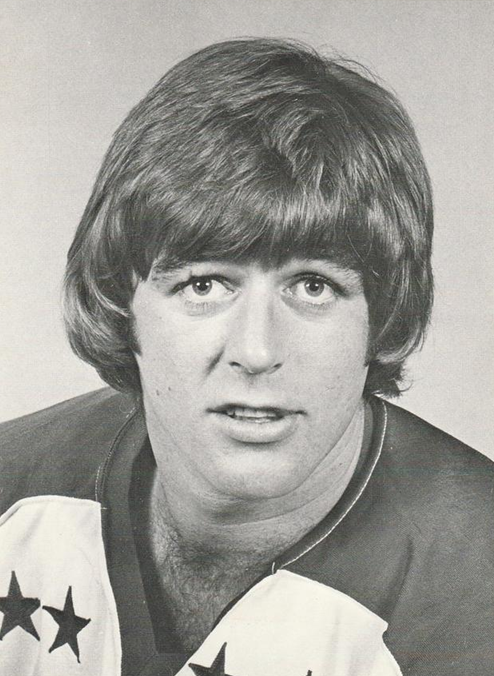
- Born: August 9, 1952 (age 73) Cranston, Rhode Island, U.S.
- Height: 6 ft 4 in (193 cm)
- Weight: 215 lb (98 kg; 15 st 5 lb)
- Position: Center
- Shot: Left
- Played for: Pittsburgh Penguins; Washington Capitals; Philadelphia Flyers; St. Louis Blues; Minnesota North Stars
- National team: United States
- NHL draft: Undrafted
- Playing career: 1973–1980

Harvey A. Bennett (born August 9, 1952) is an American former professional ice hockey player. He played center for the Pittsburgh Penguins, Washington Capitals, Philadelphia Flyers, St. Louis Blues, and Minnesota North Stars in a total of 272 National Hockey League (NHL) games over parts of five seasons. His father Harvey Bennett Sr. and two of his brothers (Curt Bennett and Bill Bennett) also played in the NHL. On August 20, 2022, Harvey joined his father, Harvey, Sr., and brother, Curt, as an honored member of the Rhode Island Hockey Hall of Fame.

== Playing career ==
Originally signed as a free agent by the Pittsburgh Penguins after previously playing for the Boston College men's ice hockey team, Bennett also represented the Washington Capitals, Philadelphia Flyers, Minnesota North Stars, and St. Louis Blues during his professional career. He was a member of the United States national team at the inaugural 1976 Canada Cup as well as the 1978 Ice Hockey World Championship tournament.

== Career statistics ==
=== Regular season and playoffs ===
			Regular season					Playoffs
Season	Team	League	GP	G	A	Pts	PIM	GP	G	A	Pts	PIM
1969–70	Cranston High School East	HS-RI	—	—	—	—	—	—	—	—	—	—
1970–71	Boston College	ECAC	26	8	10	18	10	—	—	—	—	—
1971–72	Boston College	ECAC	29	8	9	17	27	—	—	—	—	—
1972–73	Boston College	ECAC	27	3	7	10	21	—	—	—	—	—
1973–74	Des Moines Capitols	IHL	74	31	50	81	93	10	3	6	9	17
1974–75	Hershey Bears	AHL	61	17	19	36	99	12	5	3	8	37
1974–75	Pittsburgh Penguins	NHL	7	0	0	0	0	—	—	—	—	—
1975–76	Pittsburgh Penguins	NHL	25	3	3	6	53	—	—	—	—	—
1975–76	Washington Capitals	NHL	49	12	10	22	39	—	—	—	—	—
1976–77	Washington Capitals	NHL	18	2	6	8	34	—	—	—	—	—
1976–77	Philadelphia Flyers	NHL	51	12	8	20	60	4	0	0	0	2
1977–78	Minnesota North Stars	NHL	64	11	10	21	91	—	—	—	—	—
1977–78	Philadelphia Flyers	NHL	2	1	0	1	7	—	—	—	—	—
1978–79	St. Louis Blues	NHL	52	3	9	12	63	—	—	—	—	—
1978–79	Salt Lake Golden Eagles	CHL	1	0	0	0	0	—	—	—	—	—
1979–80	Birmingham Bulls	CHL	69	15	22	37	96	4	0	2	2	2
NHL totals			268	44	46	90	347	4	0	0	0	2
