= 1977–78 Washington Capitals season =

NHL hockey team season

1977–78 Washington Capitals
- Division: 5th Norris
- Conference: 9th Campbell
- 1977–78 record: 17–49–14
- Home record: 10–23–7
- Road record: 7–26–7
- Goals for: 195
- Goals against: 321

Team information
- General manager: Max McNab
- Coach: Tom McVie
- Captain: Yvon Labre
- Alternate captains: None
- Arena: Capital Centre

Team leaders
- Goals: Guy Charron (38)
- Assists: Bob Sirois (37)
- Points: Guy Charron (73)
- Penalty minutes: Gord Lane (195)
- Plus/minus: Mike Marson (+1)
- Wins: Jim Bedard (11)
- Goals against average: Jim Bedard (3.67)

The 1977–78 Washington Capitals season was the Washington Capitals fourth season in the National Hockey League (NHL). The Capitals still had several years to go before they would win enough games to qualify for the playoffs. The 1977–78 season was the fourth season in a row that the Capitals missed the playoffs for the first time in franchise history.

== Regular season ==
=== Final standings ===
Norris Division
	GP	W	L	T	GF	GA	Pts
**Montreal Canadiens**	80	59	10	11	359	183	129
**Detroit Red Wings**	80	32	34	14	252	266	78
**Los Angeles Kings**	80	31	34	15	243	245	77
Pittsburgh Penguins	80	25	37	18	254	321	68
Washington Capitals	80	17	49	14	195	321	48

Note: GP = Games played, W = Wins, L = Losses, T = Ties, Pts = Points, GF = Goals for, GA = Goals against
Note: Teams that qualified for the playoffs are highlighted in bold.

=== Record vs. opponents ===
Norris Division record vs. opponents

**Vs. Wales Conference**

**Vs. Campbell Conference**

**Vs. Norris Division**

1977–78 NHL records
Team	**DET**	**LAK**	**MTL**	**PIT**	**WSH**	**Total**
Detroit	—	3–2–1	1–4–1	3–2–1	4–1–1	**11–9–4**
Los Angeles	2–3–1	—	1–4–1	3–0–3	4–2	**10–9–5**
Montreal	4–1–1	4–1–1	—	5–1	5–0–1	**18–3–3**
Pittsburgh	2–3–1	0–3–3	1–5	—	1–4–1	**4–15–5**
Washington	1–4–1	2–4	0–5–1	4–1–1	—	**7–12–5**

**Vs. Adams Division**

1977–78 NHL records
Team	**BOS**	**BUF**	**CLE**	**TOR**	**Total**
Detroit	0–4–1	2–2–1	2–2–1	1–2–2	**5–10–5**
Los Angeles	0–5	0–3–2	3–1–1	3–2	**6–11–3**
Montreal	4–0–1	2–3	4–1	4–0–1	**14–4–2**
Pittsburgh	0–5	0–0–5	5–0	3–2	**8–7–5**
Washington	0–4–1	1–3–1	3–2	0–4–1	**4–13–3**

**Vs. Patrick Division**

1977–78 NHL records
Team	**ATL**	**NYI**	**NYR**	**PHI**	**Total**
Detroit	2–1–1	0–4	1–2–1	1–2–1	**4–9–3**
Los Angeles	2–1–1	0–2–2	3–1	0–3–1	**5–7–4**
Montreal	2–0–2	4–0	3–1	2–0–2	**11–1–4**
Pittsburgh	1–3	1–2–1	2–0–2	0–3–1	**4–8–4**
Washington	2–1–1	0–4	0–2–2	0–4	**2–11–3**

**Vs. Smythe Division**

1977–78 NHL records
Team	**CHI**	**COL**	**MIN**	**STL**	**VAN**	**Total**
Detroit	1–3	2–1–1	4–0	3–1	2–1–1	**12–6–2**
Los Angeles	2–2	2–1–1	2–1–1	2–2	2–1–1	**10–7–3**
Montreal	3–0–1	4–0	2–2	4–0	3–0–1	**16–2–2**
Pittsburgh	2–1–1	2–1–1	2–2	2–1–1	1–2–1	**9–7–4**
Washington	0–3–1	2–1–1	1–2–1	1–1–2	0–4	**4–11–5**

== Schedule and results ==
1977–78 regular season
October

Game	Result	Date	Score	Opponent	Record
1	W	October 14, 1977	2–1	Pittsburgh Penguins (1977–78)	1–0–0
2	L	October 15, 1977	2–4	@ Cleveland Barons (1977–78)	1–1–0
3	L	October 19, 1977	3–5	Montreal Canadiens (1977–78)	1–2–0
4	L	October 24, 1977	1–5	@ Montreal Canadiens (1977–78)	1–3–0
5	W	October 26, 1977	6–2	@ Atlanta Flames (1977–78)	2–3–0
6	L	October 28, 1977	1–8	@ Colorado Rockies (1977–78)	2–4–0
7	L	October 29, 1977	4–7	@ Minnesota North Stars (1977–78)	2–5–0

November

Game	Result	Date	Score	Opponent	Record
8	T	November 2, 1977	2–2	Chicago Black Hawks (1977–78)	2–5–1
9	L	November 3, 1977	1–4	@ Philadelphia Flyers (1977–78)	2–6–1
10	L	November 5, 1977	1–3	Philadelphia Flyers (1977–78)	2–7–1
11	L	November 8, 1977	1–5	Los Angeles Kings (1977–78)	2–8–1
12	T	November 9, 1977	1–1	@ Detroit Red Wings (1977–78)	2–8–2
13	L	November 11, 1977	1–3	Toronto Maple Leafs (1977–78)	2–9–2
14	L	November 13, 1977	0–6	New York Islanders (1977–78)	2–10–2
15	T	November 15, 1977	2–2	@ St. Louis Blues (1977–78)	2–10–3
16	L	November 16, 1977	2–5	@ Toronto Maple Leafs (1977–78)	2–11–3
17	L	November 19, 1977	6–7	Buffalo Sabres (1977–78)	2–12–3
18	L	November 20, 1977	2–5	@ Buffalo Sabres (1977–78)	2–13–3
19	T	November 23, 1977	2–2	Atlanta Flames (1977–78)	2–13–4
20	L	November 24, 1977	0–6	@ Boston Bruins (1977–78)	2–14–4
21	T	November 26, 1977	4–4	@ Toronto Maple Leafs (1977–78)	2–14–5
22	L	November 29, 1977	2–4	@ Los Angeles Kings (1977–78)	2–15–5

December

Game	Result	Date	Score	Opponent	Record
23	L	December 2, 1977	2–3	Cleveland Barons (1977–78)	2–16–5
24	L	December 4, 1977	2–4	Pittsburgh Penguins (1977–78)	2–17–5
25	L	December 6, 1977	2–5	Vancouver Canucks (1977–78)	2–18–5
26	W	December 7, 1977	5–3	@ Cleveland Barons (1977–78)	3–18–5
27	L	December 10, 1977	1–5	@ Atlanta Flames (1977–78)	3–19–5
28	W	December 11, 1977	2–1	St. Louis Blues (1977–78)	4–19–5
29	L	December 13, 1977	1–3	@ Vancouver Canucks (1977–78)	4–20–5
30	W	December 17, 1977	2–1	@ Los Angeles Kings (1977–78)	5–20–5
31	T	December 21, 1977	5–5	@ New York Rangers (1977–78)	5–20–6
32	W	December 23, 1977	3–2	Detroit Red Wings (1977–78)	6–20–6
33	L	December 27, 1977	3–6	Boston Bruins (1977–78)	6–21–6
34	T	December 28, 1977	2–2	@ Pittsburgh Penguins (1977–78)	6–21–7
35	T	December 30, 1977	3–3	New York Rangers (1977–78)	6–21–8

January

Game	Result	Date	Score	Opponent	Record
36	W	January 2, 1978	3–2	Pittsburgh Penguins (1977–78)	7–21–8
37	W	January 4, 1978	4–0	Los Angeles Kings (1977–78)	8–21–8
38	T	January 7, 1978	4–4	Buffalo Sabres (1977–78)	8–21–9
39	L	January 8, 1978	1–3	@ Chicago Black Hawks (1977–78)	8–22–9
40	L	January 11, 1978	3–6	Detroit Red Wings (1977–78)	8–23–9
41	T	January 13, 1978	2–2	@ Minnesota North Stars (1977–78)	8–23–10
42	L	January 14, 1978	0–4	New York Islanders (1977–78)	8–24–10
43	L	January 18, 1978	2–5	@ Chicago Black Hawks (1977–78)	8–25–10
44	L	January 19, 1978	1–4	@ Boston Bruins (1977–78)	8–26–10
45	W	January 21, 1978	5–2	@ Pittsburgh Penguins (1977–78)	9–26–10
46	L	January 22, 1978	3–6	@ Detroit Red Wings (1977–78)	9–27–10
47	T	January 25, 1978	3–3	Colorado Rockies (1977–78)	9–27–11
48	L	January 27, 1978	2–5	Boston Bruins (1977–78)	9–28–11
49	L	January 29, 1978	0–4	Minnesota North Stars (1977–78)	9–29–11
50	L	January 31, 1978	2–4	@ Vancouver Canucks (1977–78)	9–30–11

February

Game	Result	Date	Score	Opponent	Record
51	L	February 1, 1978	3–8	@ Los Angeles Kings (1977–78)	9–31–11
52	L	February 4, 1978	1–6	@ New York Islanders (1977–78)	9–32–11
53	L	February 5, 1978	1–4	@ Buffalo Sabres (1977–78)	9–33–11
54	W	February 10, 1978	4–1	@ Cleveland Barons (1977–78)	10–33–11
55	L	February 12, 1978	1–4	@ Philadelphia Flyers (1977–78)	10–34–11
56	L	February 14, 1978	2–4	Vancouver Canucks (1977–78)	10–35–11
57	L	February 17, 1978	2–8	Montreal Canadiens (1977–78)	10–36–11
58	W	February 19, 1978	2–1	Minnesota North Stars (1977–78)	11–36–11
59	L	February 21, 1978	1–4	Los Angeles Kings (1977–78)	11–37–11
60	L	February 23, 1978	1–4	@ Detroit Red Wings (1977–78)	11–38–11
61	L	February 25, 1978	0–4	@ Toronto Maple Leafs (1977–78)	11–39–11
62	L	February 26, 1978	1–6	Philadelphia Flyers (1977–78)	11–40–11
63	W	February 28, 1978	7–4	Colorado Rockies (1977–78)	12–40–11

March

Game	Result	Date	Score	Opponent	Record
64	T	March 4, 1978	3–3	@ St. Louis Blues (1977–78)	12–40–12
65	L	March 8, 1978	3–4	@ Montreal Canadiens (1977–78)	12–41–12
66	L	March 12, 1978	2–8	@ New York Rangers (1977–78)	12–42–12
67	L	March 15, 1978	2–5	Toronto Maple Leafs (1977–78)	12–43–12
68	W	March 18, 1978	8–3	Cleveland Barons (1977–78)	13–43–12
69	L	March 19, 1978	2–3	St. Louis Blues (1977–78)	13–44–12
70	L	March 22, 1978	2–6	Chicago Black Hawks (1977–78)	13–45–12
71	L	March 24, 1978	4–11	New York Rangers (1977–78)	13–46–12
72	L	March 25, 1978	0–5	@ Montreal Canadiens (1977–78)	13–47–12
73	L	March 26, 1978	1–4	Detroit Red Wings (1977–78)	13–48–12
74	T	March 28, 1978	4–4	Boston Bruins (1977–78)	13–48–13
75	W	March 30, 1978	4–3	@ Colorado Rockies (1977–78)	14–48–13

April

Game	Result	Date	Score	Opponent	Record
76	L	April 1, 1978	2–3	@ New York Islanders (1977–78)	14–49–13
77	T	April 2, 1978	4–4	Montreal Canadiens (1977–78)	14–49–14
78	W	April 4, 1978	4–3	Buffalo Sabres (1977–78)	15–49–14
79	W	April 8, 1978	6–4	@ Pittsburgh Penguins (1977–78)	16–49–14
80	W	April 9, 1978	4–2	Atlanta Flames (1977–78)	17–49–14

Legend: Win (2 points) Loss (0 points) Tie (1 point)

== Player statistics ==
=== Regular season ===
Scoring

Player	Pos	GP	G	A	Pts	PIM	+/-	PPG	SHG	GWG
Guy Charron	C	80	38	35	73	12	−25	4	0	3
Bob Sirois	RW	72	24	37	61	6	−11	5	0	1
Gerry Meehan	C	78	19	24	43	10	−41	7	0	2
Robert Picard	D	75	10	27	37	101	−26	2	0	4
Bill Riley	RW	57	13	12	25	125	−15	5	0	0
Bob Girard	LW	52	9	14	23	6	−3	1	0	2
Dave Forbes	LW	77	11	11	22	119	−34	0	0	0
Tom Rowe	RW	63	13	8	21	82	−18	1	0	0
Bill Collins	RW	74	10	9	19	18	−32	0	1	1
Garnet Bailey	LW	40	7	12	19	28	−12	0	0	2
Rick Green	D	60	5	14	19	67	−35	4	0	1
Rick Bragnalo	C	44	2	13	15	22	−6	0	0	0
Bryan Watson	D	79	3	11	14	167	−12	0	1	0
Gord Smith	D	80	4	7	11	78	−20	0	0	1
Larry Bolonchuk	D	49	3	8	11	79	−19	0	0	0
Gord Lane	D	69	2	9	11	195	−19	0	0	0
Jean Lemieux	D	16	3	7	10	0	−12	3	0	0
Jack Lynch	D	29	1	8	9	4	−13	0	0	0
Mike Marson	LW	46	4	4	8	101	1	0	0	0
Craig Patrick	RW	44	1	7	8	4	−8	1	0	0
Yvon Labre	D	22	0	8	8	41	0	0	0	0
Eddy Godin	RW	18	3	3	6	6	−14	0	0	0
Ron Lalonde	C	67	1	5	6	16	−18	0	0	0
Walt McKechnie	C	16	4	1	5	0	−14	1	0	0
Doug Gibson	C	11	2	1	3	0	−3	0	0	0
Mark Lofthouse	RW/C	18	2	1	3	8	−5	0	0	0
Jim Bedard	G	43	0	2	2	4	0	0	0	0
Nelson Burton	LW	5	1	0	1	8	−3	0	0	0
Doug Patey	RW	2	0	1	1	0	1	0	0	0
Blair Stewart	C	8	0	1	1	9	−3	0	0	0
Gary Smith	G	17	0	0	0	6	0	0	0	0
Tony White	LW	1	0	0	0	0	−4	0	0	0
Bernie Wolfe	G	25	0	0	0	0	0	0	0	0

Goaltending

Player	MIN	GP	W	L	T	GA	GAA	SO
Jim Bedard	2492	43	11	23	7	152	3.66	1
Bernie Wolfe	1328	25	4	14	4	94	4.25	0
Gary Smith	980	17	2	12	3	68	4.16	0
Team:	4800	80	17	49	14	314	3.92	1

Note: GP = Games played; G = Goals; A = Assists; Pts = Points; +/- = Plus/Minus; PIM = Penalty minutes; PPG=Power-play goals; SHG=Short-handed goals; GWG=Game-winning goals
MIN=Minutes played; W = Wins; L = Losses; T = Ties; GA = Goals against; GAA = Goals against average; SO = Shutouts;

== Draft picks ==
Washington's draft picks at the 1977 NHL amateur draft held at the Mount Royal Hotel in Montreal.

Round	#	Player	Nationality	College/Junior/Club team (League)
1	3	Robert Picard	Canada	Montreal Juniors (QMJHL)
2	21	Mark Lofthouse	Canada	New Westminster Bruins (WCHL)
3	39	Eddy Godin	Canada	Quebec Remparts (QMJHL)
4	57	Nelson Burton	Canada	Quebec Remparts (QMJHL)
5	75	Denis Turcotte	Canada	Quebec Remparts (QMJHL)
6	93	Perry Schnarr	Canada	University of Denver (WCHA)
7	111	Rollie Boutin	Canada	Lethbridge Broncos (WCHL)
8	127	Brent Tremblay	Canada	Trois-Rivières Draveurs (QMJHL)
9	143	Don Micheletti	United States	University of Minnesota (WCHA)
10	156	Archie Henderson	Canada	Victoria Cougars (WCHL)

== See also ==
- 1977–78 NHL season
