= 1977–78 Atlanta Flames season =

NHL team season

1977–78 Atlanta Flames
- Division: 3rd Patrick
- Conference: 3rd Campbell
- 1977–78 record: 34–27–19
- Home record: 20–13–7
- Road record: 14–14–12
- Goals for: 274
- Goals against: 252

Team information
- General manager: Cliff Fletcher
- Coach: Fred Creighton
- Captain: Tom Lysiak
- Alternate captains: None
- Arena: Omni Coliseum

Team leaders
- Goals: Bob MacMillan (31)
- Assists: Tom Lysiak (42)
- Points: Tom Lysiak (69)
- Penalty minutes: Willi Plett (171)
- Wins: Dan Bouchard (25)
- Goals against average: Dan Bouchard (2.75)

The 1977–78 Atlanta Flames season was the sixth season for the franchise.

== Regular season ==
=== Final standings ===
Patrick Division
	GP	W	L	T	GF	GA	Pts
**New York Islanders**	80	48	17	15	334	210	111
**Philadelphia Flyers**	80	45	20	15	296	200	105
**Atlanta Flames**	80	34	27	19	274	252	87
**New York Rangers**	80	30	37	13	279	280	73

Note: GP = Games played, W = Wins, L = Losses, T = Ties, Pts = Points, GF = Goals for, GA = Goals against
Note: Teams that qualified for the playoffs are highlighted in bold.

=== Record vs. opponents ===
Patrick Division record vs. opponents

**Vs. Campbell Conference**

**Vs. Wales Conference**

**Vs. Patrick Division**

1977–78 NHL records
Team	**ATL**	**NYI**	**NYR**	**PHI**	**Total**
Atlanta	—	1–2–3	6–0	1–4–1	**8–6–4**
N.Y. Islanders	2–1–3	—	4–2	2–1–3	**8–4–6**
N.Y. Rangers	0–6	2–4	—	0–4–2	**2–14–2**
Philadelphia	4–1–1	1–2–3	4–0–2	—	**9–3–6**

**Vs. Smythe Division**

1977–78 NHL records
Team	**CHI**	**COL**	**MIN**	**STL**	**VAN**	**Total**
Atlanta	1–2–2	2–1–2	4–1	4–0–1	2–1–2	**13–5–7**
N.Y. Islanders	2–1–2	4–0–1	4–1	4–0–1	5–0	**19–2–4**
N.Y. Rangers	3–1–1	2–2–1	3–0–2	4–0–1	4–1	**16–4–5**
Philadelphia	2–2–1	3–2	3–2	4–1	5–0	**17–7–1**

**Vs. Adams Division**

1977–78 NHL records
Team	**BOS**	**BUF**	**CLE**	**TOR**	**Total**
Atlanta	1–2–1	1–2–1	2–1–1	3–2	**7–7–3**
N.Y. Islanders	3–1	2–3	1–1–2	3–1	**9–6–2**
N.Y. Rangers	1–4	1–2–1	3–1	1–3	**6–10–1**
Philadelphia	2–1–1	0–3–1	4–0–1	1–3	**7–7–3**

**Vs. Norris Division**

1977–78 NHL records
Team	**DET**	**LAK**	**MTL**	**PIT**	**WSH**	**Total**
Atlanta	1–2–1	1–2–1	0–2–2	3–1	1–2–1	**6–9–5**
N.Y. Islanders	4–0	2–0–2	0–4	2–1–1	4–0	**12–5–3**
N.Y. Rangers	2–1–1	1–3	1–3	0–2–2	2–0–2	**6–9–5**
Philadelphia	2–1–1	3–0–1	0–2–2	3–0–1	4–0	**12–3–5**

== Schedule and results ==
1977–78 regular season
October

Game	Result	Date	Score	Opponent	Record	Attendance
1	T	October 13, 1977	2–2	@ Boston Bruins (1977–78)	0–0–1	9,423
2	W	October 15, 1977	3–1	St. Louis Blues (1977–78)	1–0–1	11,756
3	W	October 19, 1977	5–1	Minnesota North Stars (1977–78)	2–0–1	8,559
4	T	October 21, 1977	3–3	New York Islanders (1977–78)	2–0–2	11,948
5	L	October 22, 1977	2–5	@ Pittsburgh Penguins (1977–78)	2–1–2	8,030
6	T	October 25, 1977	2–2	@ St. Louis Blues (1977–78)	2–1–3	9,359
7	L	October 26, 1977	2–6	Washington Capitals (1977–78)	2–2–3	8,247
8	W	October 29, 1977	4–3	New York Rangers (1977–78)	3–2–3	11,872

November

Game	Result	Date	Score	Opponent	Record	Attendance
9	L	November 1, 1977	0–9	@ New York Islanders (1977–78)	3–3–3	14,702
10	T	November 2, 1977	2–2	@ Montreal Canadiens (1977–78)	3–3–4	15,358
11	W	November 4, 1977	5–2	Pittsburgh Penguins (1977–78)	4–3–4	11,528
12	T	November 6, 1977	3–3	@ Chicago Black Hawks (1977–78)	4–3–5	11,224
13	L	November 9, 1977	0–4	Toronto Maple Leafs (1977–78)	4–4–5	9,241
14	L	November 12, 1977	3–6	Boston Bruins (1977–78)	4–5–5	13,678
15	W	November 13, 1977	5–2	@ New York Rangers (1977–78)	5–5–5	17,500
16	L	November 16, 1977	2–6	Buffalo Sabres (1977–78)	5–6–5	8,659
17	W	November 18, 1977	5–3	Detroit Red Wings (1977–78)	6–6–5	10,192
18	L	November 20, 1977	0–4	@ Philadelphia Flyers (1977–78)	6–7–5	17,077
19	W	November 22, 1977	4–2	Minnesota North Stars (1977–78)	7–7–5	8,147
20	T	November 23, 1977	2–2	@ Washington Capitals (1977–78)	7–7–6	8,711
21	T	November 26, 1977	4–4	Los Angeles Kings (1977–78)	7–7–7	13,473
22	L	November 29, 1977	3–4	@ Minnesota North Stars (1977–78)	7–8–7	6,296

December

Game	Result	Date	Score	Opponent	Record	Attendance
23	L	December 2, 1977	2–3	@ Vancouver Canucks (1977–78)	7–9–7	N/A
24	L	December 3, 1977	1–4	@ Los Angeles Kings (1977–78)	7–10–7	11,168
25	T	December 5, 1977	2–2	@ Montreal Canadiens (1977–78)	7–10–8	15,109
26	T	December 7, 1977	2–2	Vancouver Canucks (1977–78)	7–10–9	7,795
27	W	December 10, 1977	5–1	Washington Capitals (1977–78)	8–10–9	7,942
28	W	December 11, 1977	5–1	@ Pittsburgh Penguins (1977–78)	9–10–9	7,387
29	L	December 15, 1977	3–6	Cleveland Barons (1977–78)	9–11–9	7,829
30	L	December 17, 1977	3–4	Philadelphia Flyers (1977–78)	9–12–9	12,171
31	L	December 18, 1977	0–3	@ Chicago Black Hawks (1977–78)	9–13–9	8,856
32	T	December 20, 1977	2–2	@ Vancouver Canucks (1977–78)	9–13–10	14,350
33	W	December 23, 1977	6–2	@ Colorado Rockies (1977–78)	10–13–10	5,023
34	L	December 27, 1977	2–4	Chicago Black Hawks (1977–78)	10–14–10	10,857
35	W	December 29, 1977	5–4	St. Louis Blues (1977–78)	11–14–10	10,701
36	W	December 31, 1977	3–0	@ Toronto Maple Leafs (1977–78)	12–14–10	16,485

January

Game	Result	Date	Score	Opponent	Record	Attendance
37	T	January 1, 1978	2–2	@ Buffalo Sabres (1977–78)	12–14–11	16,433
38	L	January 4, 1978	1–4	Montreal Canadiens (1977–78)	12–15–11	10,287
39	W	January 6, 1978	5–3	Philadelphia Flyers (1977–78)	13–15–11	13,051
40	W	January 9, 1978	5–2	@ Toronto Maple Leafs (1977–78)	14–15–11	16,485
41	W	January 11, 1978	4–2	Colorado Rockies (1977–78)	15–15–11	7,264
42	L	January 14, 1978	4–8	Los Angeles Kings (1977–78)	15–16–11	11,114
43	L	January 16, 1978	3–5	@ Philadelphia Flyers (1977–78)	15–17–11	17,077
44	W	January 18, 1978	1–0	Pittsburgh Penguins (1977–78)	16–17–11	7,942
45	W	January 20, 1978	5–3	New York Rangers (1977–78)	17–17–11	14,097
46	W	January 22, 1978	4–3	@ Minnesota North Stars (1977–78)	18–17–11	7,744
47	L	January 26, 1978	2–5	Montreal Canadiens (1977–78)	18–18–11	10,954
48	L	January 28, 1978	5–7	Toronto Maple Leafs (1977–78)	18–19–11	12,982
49	W	January 29, 1978	6–2	@ Cleveland Barons (1977–78)	19–19–11	3,321
50	W	January 31, 1978	7–4	Minnesota North Stars (1977–78)	20–19–11	7,163

February

Game	Result	Date	Score	Opponent	Record	Attendance
51	L	February 2, 1978	2–5	New York Islanders (1977–78)	20–20–11	9,079
52	T	February 4, 1978	2–2	Colorado Rockies (1977–78)	20–20–12	10,377
53	W	February 7, 1978	4–2	@ Vancouver Canucks (1977–78)	21–20–12	N/A
54	W	February 9, 1978	4–2	@ Los Angeles Kings (1977–78)	22–20–12	10,045
55	L	February 10, 1978	2–3	@ Colorado Rockies (1977–78)	22–21–12	8,852
56	T	February 12, 1978	2–2	@ Chicago Black Hawks (1977–78)	22–21–13	13,582
57	T	February 15, 1978	5–5	@ Cleveland Barons (1977–78)	22–21–14	2,696
58	L	February 16, 1978	3–5	@ Detroit Red Wings (1977–78)	22–22–14	12,215
59	T	February 18, 1978	3–3	@ New York Islanders (1977–78)	22–22–15	15,317
60	T	February 22, 1978	3–3	New York Islanders (1977–78)	22–22–16	11,106
61	T	February 25, 1978	2–2	Detroit Red Wings (1977–78)	22–22–17	13,124
62	W	February 27, 1978	5–3	@ New York Rangers (1977–78)	23–22–17	17,500

March

Game	Result	Date	Score	Opponent	Record	Attendance
63	L	March 1, 1978	3–4	Buffalo Sabres (1977–78)	23–23–17	8,294
64	L	March 2, 1978	3–4	@ Boston Bruins (1977–78)	23–24–17	11,544
65	W	March 4, 1978	9–3	Cleveland Barons (1977–78)	24–24–17	10,014
66	L	March 7, 1978	3–5	@ Philadelphia Flyers (1977–78)	24–25–17	17,077
67	W	March 8, 1978	8–3	Vancouver Canucks (1977–78)	25–25–17	7,224
68	W	March 11, 1978	4–1	Chicago Black Hawks (1977–78)	26–25–17	13,174
69	T	March 14, 1978	4–4	@ Colorado Rockies (1977–78)	26–25–18	5,522
70	W	March 15, 1978	6–2	@ St. Louis Blues (1977–78)	27–25–18	9,950
71	W	March 18, 1978	5–2	@ New York Islanders (1977–78)	28–25–18	15,317
72	L	March 22, 1978	1–4	@ Detroit Red Wings (1977–78)	28–26–18	13,874
73	W	March 23, 1978	5–3	St. Louis Blues (1977–78)	29–26–18	9,228
74	W	March 25, 1978	6–3	Boston Bruins (1977–78)	30–26–18	14,883
75	W	March 29, 1978	7–4	Toronto Maple Leafs (1977–78)	31–26–18	11,485

April

Game	Result	Date	Score	Opponent	Record	Attendance
76	W	April 1, 1978	6–0	New York Rangers (1977–78)	32–26–18	8,242
77	W	April 2, 1978	4–2	@ Buffalo Sabres (1977–78)	33–26–18	16,433
78	W	April 5, 1978	4–2	@ New York Rangers (1977–78)	34–26–18	17,500
79	T	April 8, 1978	1–1	Philadelphia Flyers (1977–78)	34–26–19	15,155
80	L	April 9, 1978	2–4	@ Washington Capitals (1977–78)	34–27–19	12,563

Legend: Win (2 points) Loss (0 points) Tie (1 point)

== Player statistics ==
=== Skaters ===
Note: GP = Games played; G = Goals; A = Assists; Pts = Points; PIM = Penalty minutes

		Regular season					Playoffs
Player	#	GP	G	A	Pts	PIM	GP	G	A	Pts	PIM
Tom Lysiak	12	80	27	42	69	54	2	1	0	1	2
Guy Chouinard	16	73	28	30	58	8	2	1	0	1	0
Eric Vail	27	79	22	36	58	16	2	1	1	2	0
Harold Phillipoff	24	67	17	36	53	128	2	0	1	1	2
Bob MacMillan^{†}	11	52	31	21	52	26	2	0	2	2	0
Bill Clement	10	70	20	30	50	34	2	0	0	0	2
John Gould	21	79	19	28	47	21	2	0	0	0	2
Willi Plett	25	78	22	21	43	171	–	–	–	–	-
Ken Houston	6	74	22	16	38	51	2	0	0	0	0
Bobby Lalonde	7	73	14	23	37	28	1	1	0	1	0
Rey Comeau	18	79	10	22	32	20	2	0	0	0	0
Richard Mulhern	4	79	9	23	32	47	2	0	1	1	0
Ed Kea	19	60	3	23	26	40	1	0	0	0	0
Dave Shand	8	80	2	23	25	94	2	0	0	0	4
Miles Zaharko	23	71	1	19	20	26	1	0	0	0	0
Bobby Simpson	22	55	10	8	18	49	2	0	0	0	2
Dick Redmond^{†}	5	42	7	11	18	16	2	1	0	1	0
Pat Ribble	3	80	5	12	17	68	2	0	1	1	2
Curt Bennett^{‡}	5	25	3	7	10	10	–	–	–	–	-
Barry Gibbs^{‡}	2	27	1	5	6	24	–	–	–	–	-
Greg Fox	2	16	1	2	3	25	2	0	1	1	8
Dan Bouchard	30	58	0	3	3	6	2
Tim Ecclestone	14	11	0	2	2	2	1	0	0	0	0
Yves Belanger^{†}	31	17	0	1	1	0	–	–	–	–	-
Phil Myre^{‡}	1	9	0	0	0	2	–	–	–	–	-

^{†}Denotes player spent time with another team before joining Atlanta. Stats reflect time with the Flames only.
^{‡}Traded mid-season

=== Goaltending ===
Note: GP = Games played; TOI = Time on ice (minutes); W = Wins; L = Losses; OT = Overtime/shootout losses; GA = Goals against; SO = Shutouts; GAA = Goals against average

		Regular season								Playoffs
Player	#	GP	TOI	W	L	T	GA	SO	GAA	GP	TOI	W	L	GA	SO	GAA
Dan Bouchard	30	58	3340	25	12	19	153	2	2.75	2	120	0	2	7	0	3.50
Yves Belanger	31	17	937	7	8	0	55	1	3.52	–	–	–	–	–	–	-.--
Phil Myre	1	9	523	2	7	0	43	0	4.93	–	–	–	–	–	–	-.--

== Transactions ==
The Flames were involved in the following transactions during the 1977–78 season.

=== Trades ===
May 23, 1977	To Atlanta Flames Ab DeMarco Jr.	To Los Angeles Kings Randy Manery
August 18, 1977	To Atlanta Flames Cash	To Detroit Red Wings Rick Bowness
December 12, 1977	To Atlanta Flames Yves Belanger; Bob MacMillan; Dick Redmond; 2nd round pick in 1979 (Mike Perovich)	To St. Louis Blues Curt Bennett; Barry Gibbs; Phil Myre

=== Free agents ===
Player / Former team; C Bobby Lalonde / Vancouver Canucks	Player / New team

== Draft picks ==
Round	Pick	Player	Nationality	College/Junior/Club team
2	20.	Miles Zaharko (D)	Canada	New Westminster Bruins (WCHL)
2	28.	Don Laurence (C)	Canada	Kitchener Rangers (OHA)
2	31.	Brian Hill (RW)	Canada	Medicine Hat Tigers (WCHL)
4	72.	Jim Craig (G)	United States	Boston University (NCAA)
5	82.	Curtis Christopherson (D)	United States	Colorado College (NCAA)
6	100.	Bernie Harbec (C)	Canada	Laval National (QMJHL)
7	118.	Bobby Gould (RW)	Canada	University of New Hampshire (NCAA)
8	133.	Jim Bennett (RW)	United States	Brown University (NCAA)
9	148.	Tim Harrer (RW)	United States	University of Minnesota (NCAA)
