= 1977–78 New York Islanders season =

NHL hockey team season

1977–78 New York Islanders
- Campbell Conference champions
- Patrick Division champions
- Division: 1st Patrick
- Conference: 1st Campbell
- 1977–78 record: 48–17–15
- Home record: 29–3–8
- Road record: 19–14–7
- Goals for: 334
- Goals against: 210

Team information
- General manager: Bill Torrey
- Coach: Al Arbour
- Captain: Clark Gillies
- Alternate captains: None
- Arena: Nassau Coliseum

Team leaders
- Goals: Mike Bossy (53)
- Assists: Bryan Trottier (77)
- Points: Bryan Trottier (123)
- Penalty minutes: Garry Howatt (146)
- Wins: Chico Resch (28)
- Goals against average: Chico Resch (2.55)

The 1977–78 New York Islanders season was the 6th season for the franchise in the National Hockey League (NHL).

== Offseason ==
=== NHL draft ===
Round	Pick	Player	Position	School/Club team
1	15	Mike Bossy	Right wing	Laval National (QMJHL)
2	33	John Tonelli	Center	Houston Aeros (WHA)
3	50	Hector Marini	Right wing	Sudbury Wolves (OMJHL)
3	51	Bruce Andres	Right wing	New Westminster Bruins (WCHL)
4	69	Steve Stoyanovich	Center	Rensselaer Polytechnic Institute (ECAC)
5	87	Markus Mattsson	Goaltender	Tampere Ilves (Finland)
6	105	Steve Letzgus	Defense	Michigan Tech University (WCHA)
7	121	Harald Luckner	Center	Karlstad (Sweden)

== Regular season ==
=== Season standings ===
Patrick Division
	GP	W	L	T	GF	GA	Pts
**New York Islanders**	80	48	17	15	334	210	111
**Philadelphia Flyers**	80	45	20	15	296	200	105
**Atlanta Flames**	80	34	27	19	274	252	87
**New York Rangers**	80	30	37	13	279	280	73

Note: GP = Games played, W = Wins, L = Losses, T = Ties, Pts = Points, GF = Goals for, GA = Goals against
Note: Teams that qualified for the playoffs are highlighted in bold.

=== Record vs. opponents ===
Patrick Division record vs. opponents

**Vs. Campbell Conference**

**Vs. Wales Conference**

**Vs. Patrick Division**

1977–78 NHL records
Team	**ATL**	**NYI**	**NYR**	**PHI**	**Total**
Atlanta	—	1–2–3	6–0	1–4–1	**8–6–4**
N.Y. Islanders	2–1–3	—	4–2	2–1–3	**8–4–6**
N.Y. Rangers	0–6	2–4	—	0–4–2	**2–14–2**
Philadelphia	4–1–1	1–2–3	4–0–2	—	**9–3–6**

**Vs. Smythe Division**

1977–78 NHL records
Team	**CHI**	**COL**	**MIN**	**STL**	**VAN**	**Total**
Atlanta	1–2–2	2–1–2	4–1	4–0–1	2–1–2	**13–5–7**
N.Y. Islanders	2–1–2	4–0–1	4–1	4–0–1	5–0	**19–2–4**
N.Y. Rangers	3–1–1	2–2–1	3–0–2	4–0–1	4–1	**16–4–5**
Philadelphia	2–2–1	3–2	3–2	4–1	5–0	**17–7–1**

**Vs. Adams Division**

1977–78 NHL records
Team	**BOS**	**BUF**	**CLE**	**TOR**	**Total**
Atlanta	1–2–1	1–2–1	2–1–1	3–2	**7–7–3**
N.Y. Islanders	3–1	2–3	1–1–2	3–1	**9–6–2**
N.Y. Rangers	1–4	1–2–1	3–1	1–3	**6–10–1**
Philadelphia	2–1–1	0–3–1	4–0–1	1–3	**7–7–3**

**Vs. Norris Division**

1977–78 NHL records
Team	**DET**	**LAK**	**MTL**	**PIT**	**WSH**	**Total**
Atlanta	1–2–1	1–2–1	0–2–2	3–1	1–2–1	**6–9–5**
N.Y. Islanders	4–0	2–0–2	0–4	2–1–1	4–0	**12–5–3**
N.Y. Rangers	2–1–1	1–3	1–3	0–2–2	2–0–2	**6–9–5**
Philadelphia	2–1–1	3–0–1	0–2–2	3–0–1	4–0	**12–3–5**

== Schedule and results ==
1977–78 regular season
October

Game	Result	Date	Score	Opponent	Record
1	L	October 13, 1977	2–3	@ Buffalo Sabres (1977–78)	0–1–0
2	W	October 15, 1977	3–1	Boston Bruins (1977–78)	1–1–0
3	L	October 16, 1977	2–4	@ New York Rangers (1977–78)	1–2–0
4	T	October 18, 1977	0–0	Los Angeles Kings (1977–78)	1–2–1
5	T	October 21, 1977	3–3	@ Atlanta Flames (1977–78)	1–2–2
6	W	October 22, 1977	7–2	New York Rangers (1977–78)	2–2–2
7	T	October 26, 1977	2–2	@ Los Angeles Kings (1977–78)	2–2–3
8	W	October 27, 1977	3–2	@ Vancouver Canucks (1977–78)	3–2–3
9	W	October 29, 1977	4–2	Buffalo Sabres (1977–78)	4–2–3

November

Game	Result	Date	Score	Opponent	Record
10	W	November 1, 1977	9–0	Atlanta Flames (1977–78)	5–2–3
11	L	November 2, 1977	2–3	@ Minnesota North Stars (1977–78)	5–3–3
12	W	November 5, 1977	4–3	Pittsburgh Penguins (1977–78)	6–3–3
13	L	November 6, 1977	3–5	@ Boston Bruins (1977–78)	6–4–3
14	L	November 10, 1977	1–5	Montreal Canadiens (1977–78)	6–5–3
15	T	November 12, 1977	2–2	Philadelphia Flyers (1977–78)	6–5–4
16	W	November 13, 1977	6–0	@ Washington Capitals (1977–78)	7–5–4
17	T	November 15, 1977	1–1	Chicago Black Hawks (1977–78)	7–5–5
18	T	November 17, 1977	4–4	@ Philadelphia Flyers (1977–78)	7–5–6
19	W	November 19, 1977	9–2	Vancouver Canucks (1977–78)	8–5–6
20	W	November 22, 1977	4–2	Colorado Rockies (1977–78)	9–5–6
21	W	November 23, 1977	9–2	@ Minnesota North Stars (1977–78)	10–5–6
22	L	November 26, 1977	2–5	@ Pittsburgh Penguins (1977–78)	10–6–6
23	W	November 27, 1977	4–1	@ Detroit Red Wings (1977–78)	11–6–6
24	T	November 30, 1977	3–3	@ Colorado Rockies (1977–78)	11–6–7

December

Game	Result	Date	Score	Opponent	Record
25	W	December 3, 1977	7–2	@ St. Louis Blues (1977–78)	12–6–7
26	W	December 6, 1977	4–2	Minnesota North Stars (1977–78)	13–6–7
27	W	December 7, 1977	4–0	@ Chicago Black Hawks (1977–78)	14–6–7
28	W	December 10, 1977	7–4	Detroit Red Wings (1977–78)	15–6–7
29	T	December 13, 1977	2–2	Chicago Black Hawks (1977–78)	15–6–8
30	L	December 14, 1977	2–3	@ Toronto Maple Leafs (1977–78)	15–7–8
31	W	December 17, 1977	4–1	Boston Bruins (1977–78)	16–7–8
32	W	December 20, 1977	9–1	Colorado Rockies (1977–78)	17–7–8
33	W	December 22, 1977	6–3	St. Louis Blues (1977–78)	18–7–8
34	L	December 23, 1977	5–7	@ Montreal Canadiens (1977–78)	18–8–8
35	W	December 27, 1977	4–2	@ Vancouver Canucks (1977–78)	19–8–8
36	W	December 28, 1977	4–3	@ Los Angeles Kings (1977–78)	20–8–8
37	L	December 31, 1977	2–4	Montreal Canadiens (1977–78)	20–9–8

January

Game	Result	Date	Score	Opponent	Record
38	W	January 3, 1978	4–1	Vancouver Canucks (1977–78)	21–9–8
39	W	January 7, 1978	5–3	Cleveland Barons (1977–78)	22–9–8
40	W	January 10, 1978	7–4	Colorado Rockies (1977–78)	23–9–8
41	L	January 11, 1978	3–5	@ Cleveland Barons (1977–78)	23–10–8
42	W	January 14, 1978	4–0	@ Washington Capitals (1977–78)	24–10–8
43	W	January 18, 1978	5–2	@ Minnesota North Stars (1977–78)	25–10–8
44	W	January 19, 1978	3–0	@ St. Louis Blues (1977–78)	26–10–8
45	W	January 21, 1978	6–1	Philadelphia Flyers (1977–78)	27–10–8
46	W	January 26, 1978	4–2	Toronto Maple Leafs (1977–78)	28–10–8
47	W	January 28, 1978	6–2	New York Rangers (1977–78)	29–10–8
48	L	January 30, 1978	2–3	@ Buffalo Sabres (1977–78)	29–11–8

February

Game	Result	Date	Score	Opponent	Record
49	W	February 1, 1978	7–6	@ New York Rangers (1977–78)	30–11–8
50	W	February 2, 1978	5–2	@ Atlanta Flames (1977–78)	31–11–8
51	W	February 4, 1978	6–1	Washington Capitals (1977–78)	32–11–8
52	L	February 8, 1978	4–5	@ Chicago Black Hawks (1977–78)	32–12–8
53	W	February 11, 1978	8–5	Detroit Red Wings (1977–78)	33–12–8
54	T	February 12, 1978	2–2	@ Cleveland Barons (1977–78)	33–12–9
55	W	February 14, 1978	3–2	Los Angeles Kings (1977–78)	34–12–9
56	W	February 16, 1978	5–4	@ Colorado Rockies (1977–78)	35–12–9
57	T	February 18, 1978	3–3	Atlanta Flames (1977–78)	35–12–10
58	W	February 19, 1978	4–1	@ Philadelphia Flyers (1977–78)	36–12–10
59	T	February 22, 1978	3–3	@ Atlanta Flames (1977–78)	36–12–11
60	W	February 25, 1978	7–1	Chicago Black Hawks (1977–78)	37–12–11
61	L	February 26, 1978	1–2	@ Montreal Canadiens (1977–78)	37–13–11
62	W	February 28, 1978	4–3	Toronto Maple Leafs (1977–78)	38–13–11

March

Game	Result	Date	Score	Opponent	Record
63	L	March 2, 1978	3–6	@ Buffalo Sabres (1977–78)	38–14–11
64	W	March 4, 1978	6–3	Pittsburgh Penguins (1977–78)	39–14–11
65	T	March 5, 1978	3–3	@ Pittsburgh Penguins (1977–78)	39–14–12
66	W	March 7, 1978	5–2	Vancouver Canucks (1977–78)	40–14–12
67	W	March 9, 1978	6–3	@ St. Louis Blues (1977–78)	41–14–12
68	W	March 11, 1978	4–2	Buffalo Sabres (1977–78)	42–14–12
69	T	March 14, 1978	3–3	St. Louis Blues (1977–78)	42–14–13
70	L	March 18, 1978	2–5	Atlanta Flames (1977–78)	42–15–13
71	L	March 20, 1978	2–4	@ Philadelphia Flyers (1977–78)	42–16–13
72	W	March 22, 1978	6–2	@ Toronto Maple Leafs (1977–78)	43–16–13
73	T	March 25, 1978	4–4	Cleveland Barons (1977–78)	43–16–14
74	W	March 26, 1978	6–3	Minnesota North Stars (1977–78)	44–16–14
75	L	March 29, 1978	1–5	@ New York Rangers (1977–78)	44–17–14

April

Game	Result	Date	Score	Opponent	Record
76	W	April 1, 1978	3–2	Washington Capitals (1977–78)	45–17–14
77	W	April 2, 1978	5–2	@ Detroit Red Wings (1977–78)	46–17–14
78	T	April 4, 1978	3–3	Philadelphia Flyers (1977–78)	46–17–15
79	W	April 8, 1978	7–2	New York Rangers (1977–78)	47–17–15
80	W	April 9, 1978	5–2	@ Boston Bruins (1977–78)	48–17–15

Legend: Win (2 points) Loss (0 points) Tie (1 point)

== Playoffs ==
1978 Stanley Cup playoffs
Quarterfinals vs. (6) Toronto Maple Leafs – Maple Leafs win 4–3

Game	Date	Visitor	Score	Home	OT	Series
1	April 17	Toronto	1–4	NY Islanders		1–0
2	April 19	Toronto	2–3	NY Islanders	OT	2–0
3	April 21	NY Islanders	0–2	Toronto		2–1
4	April 23	NY Islanders	1–3	Toronto		2–2
5	April 25	Toronto	1–2	NY Islanders	OT	3–2
6	April 27	NY Islanders	2–5	Toronto		3–3
7	April 27	Toronto	2–1	NY Islanders	OT	3–4

Legend: Win Loss

== Player statistics ==
Regular season
Scoring

Player	Pos	GP	G	A	Pts	PIM	+/-	PPG	SHG	GWG
Bryan Trottier	C	77	46	77	123	46	52	13	2	6
Denis Potvin	D	80	30	64	94	81	57	9	0	6
Mike Bossy	RW	73	53	38	91	6	31	25	0	5
Clark Gillies	LW	80	35	50	85	76	49	9	0	2
Bob Bourne	C	80	30	33	63	31	15	2	0	8
Billy Harris	RW	80	22	38	60	40	27	1	1	1
Bob Nystrom	RW	80	30	29	59	94	19	3	0	6
Stefan Persson	D	66	6	50	56	54	19	3	0	0
Mike Kaszycki	C	58	13	29	42	24	15	3	0	2
J.P. Parise	LW	39	12	16	28	12	19	1	0	0
Lorne Henning	C	79	12	15	27	6	10	0	2	4
Gerry Hart	D	78	2	23	25	94	44	0	0	1
Wayne Merrick	C	37	10	14	24	8	2	2	0	2
Ed Westfall	D/RW	71	5	19	24	14	7	0	1	1
Jude Drouin	C	56	5	17	22	12	14	0	0	0
Garry Howatt	LW	61	7	12	19	146	7	0	0	0
Michel Bergeron	RW	25	9	6	15	2	16	0	0	2
Dave Lewis	D	77	3	11	14	58	32	0	1	1
Pat Price	D	52	2	10	12	27	25	0	0	1
Jean Potvin	D	34	1	10	11	8	11	0	0	0
Bert Marshall	D	58	0	7	7	44	10	0	0	0
Bob Lorimer	D	5	1	0	1	0	0	0	0	0
Chico Resch	G	45	0	1	1	12	0	0	0	0
Richie Hansen	C	2	0	0	0	0	0	0	0	0
Goran Hogosta	G	1	0	0	0	0	0	0	0	0
Alex McKendry	W	4	0	0	0	2	0	0	0	0
Neil Nicholson	D	1	0	0	0	0	2	0	0	0
Billy Smith	G	38	0	0	0	35	0	0	0	0
Andre St. Laurent	C	2	0	0	0	2	0	0	0	0

Goaltending

Player	MIN	GP	W	L	T	GA	GAA	SO
Chico Resch	2637	45	28	9	7	112	2.55	3
Billy Smith	2154	38	20	8	8	95	2.65	2
Goran Hogosta	9	1	0	0	0	0	0.00	0
Team:	4800	80	48	17	15	207	2.59	5

Playoffs
Scoring

Player	Pos	GP	G	A	Pts	PIM	PPG	SHG	GWG
Bob Bourne	C	7	2	3	5	2	1	0	0
Bob Nystrom	RW	7	3	1	4	14	1	0	2
Mike Bossy	RW	7	2	2	4	2	0	0	1
Denis Potvin	D	7	2	2	4	6	0	0	0
Mike Kaszycki	C	7	1	3	4	4	0	0	0
Bryan Trottier	C	7	0	3	3	4	0	0	0
Clark Gillies	LW	7	2	0	2	15	1	0	0
Bert Marshall	D	7	0	2	2	9	0	0	0
Stefan Persson	D	7	0	2	2	6	0	0	0
Wayne Merrick	C	7	1	0	1	0	0	0	0
Garry Howatt	LW	7	0	1	1	62	0	0	0
Dave Lewis	D	7	0	1	1	11	0	0	0
Pat Price	D	5	0	1	1	2	0	0	0
Jude Drouin	C	5	0	0	0	5	0	0	0
Billy Harris	RW	7	0	0	0	4	0	0	0
Gerry Hart	D	7	0	0	0	16	0	0	0
Lorne Henning	C	7	0	0	0	4	0	0	0
Chico Resch	G	7	0	0	0	0	0	0	0
Billy Smith	G	1	0	0	0	9	0	0	0
Ed Westfall	D/RW	2	0	0	0	0	0	0	0

Goaltending

Player	MIN	GP	W	L	GA	GAA	SO
Glenn Resch	388	7	3	4	15	2.32	0
Billy Smith	47	1	0	0	1	1.28	0
Team:	435	7	3	4	16	2.21	0

Note: Pos = Position; GP = Games played; G = Goals; A = Assists; Pts = Points; +/- = plus/minus; PIM = Penalty minutes; PPG = Power-play goals; SHG = Short-handed goals; GWG = Game-winning goals
MIN = Minutes played; W = Wins; L = Losses; T = Ties; GA = Goals-against; GAA = Goals-against average; SO = Shutouts;
