= 1977–78 Colorado Rockies season =

NHL hockey team season

1977–78 Colorado Rockies
- Division: 2nd Smythe
- Conference: 6th Campbell
- 1977–78 record: 19–40–21
- Home record: 17–14–9
- Road record: 2–26–12
- Goals for: 257
- Goals against: 305

Team information
- General manager: Ray Miron
- Coach: Pat Kelly
- Captain: Wilf Paiement
- Alternate captains: None
- Arena: McNichols Sports Arena

Team leaders
- Goals: Wilf Paiement (31)
- Assists: Wilf Paiement (56)
- Points: Wilf Paiement (87)
- Penalty minutes: Wilf Paiement (114)
- Plus/minus: Tom Edur (+10)
- Wins: Doug Favell (13)
- Goals against average: Doug Favell (3.59)

The 1977–78 Colorado Rockies season was the fourth season of the franchise, and second as the Rockies. Despite winning only 19 games and finishing 21 games below .500, they finished runners-up in the weak Smythe Division and secured a playoff berth under the format in effect at the time. It was their first playoff appearance in franchise history, and the only one they would make while in Denver.

== Regular season ==
=== Final standings ===
Smythe Division
	GP	W	L	T	GF	GA	Pts
**Chicago Black Hawks**	80	32	29	19	230	220	83
**Colorado Rockies**	80	19	40	21	257	305	59
Vancouver Canucks	80	20	43	17	239	320	57
St. Louis Blues	80	20	47	13	195	304	53
Minnesota North Stars	80	18	53	9	218	325	45

Note: GP = Games played, W = Wins, L = Losses, T = Ties, Pts = Points, GF = Goals for, GA = Goals against
Note: Teams that qualified for the playoffs are highlighted in bold.

=== Record vs. opponents ===
Smythe Division record vs. opponents

**Vs. Campbell Conference**

**Vs. Wales Conference**

**Vs. Smythe Division**

1977–78 NHL records
Team	**CHI**	**COL**	**MIN**	**STL**	**VAN**	**Total**
Chicago	—	1–1–4	5–0–1	3–1–2	2–3–1	**11–5–8**
Colorado	1–1–4	—	3–1–2	1–4–1	3–0–3	**8–6–10**
Minnesota	0–5–1	1–3–2	—	1–4–1	3–3	**5–15–4**
St. Louis	1–3–2	4–1–1	4–1–1	—	3–3	**12–8–4**
Vancouver	3–2–1	0–3–3	3–3	3–3	—	**9–11–4**

**Vs. Patrick Division**

1977–78 NHL records
Team	**ATL**	**NYI**	**NYR**	**PHI**	**Total**
Chicago	2–1–2	1–2–2	1–3–1	2–2–1	**6–8–6**
Colorado	1–2–2	0–4–1	2–2–1	2–3	**5–11–4**
Minnesota	1–4	1–4	0–3–2	2–3	**4–14–2**
St. Louis	0–4–1	0–4–1	0–4–1	1–4	**1–16–3**
Vancouver	1–2–2	0–5	1–4	0–5	**2–16–2**

**Vs. Adams Division**

1977–78 NHL records
Team	**BOS**	**BUF**	**CLE**	**TOR**	**Total**
Chicago	1–3	1–2–1	3–1	1–2–1	**6–8–2**
Colorado	0–3–1	1–3	1–1–2	0–4	**2–11–3**
Minnesota	1–3	1–3	0–3–1	0–4	**2–13–1**
St. Louis	0–4	0–4	2–1–1	0–2–2	**2–11–3**
Vancouver	0–2–2	0–1–3	1–2–1	0–3–1	**1–8–7**

**Vs. Norris Division**

1977–78 NHL records
Team	**DET**	**LAK**	**MTL**	**PIT**	**WSH**	**Total**
Chicago	3–1	2–2	0–3–1	1–2–1	3–0–1	**9–8–3**
Colorado	1–2–1	1–2–1	0–4	1–2–1	1–2–1	**4–12–4**
Minnesota	0–4	1–2–1	2–2	2–2	2–1–1	**7–11–2**
St. Louis	1–3	2–2	0–4	1–2–1	1–1–2	**5–12–3**
Vancouver	1–2–1	1–2–1	0–3–1	2–1–1	4–0	**8–8–4**

== Playoffs ==
The Rockies played a best-of-three preliminary round series against the Philadelphia Flyers. The Flyers would sweep the series in two-straight games.

== Schedule and results ==
=== Regular season ===
1977–78 regular season
October

Game	Date	Score	Opponent	Record	Recap
1	October 14, 1977	4–4	Vancouver Canucks (1977–78)	0–0–1	T
2	October 15, 1977	3–3	@ Chicago Black Hawks (1977–78)	0–0–2	T
3	October 19, 1977	4–5	@ Toronto Maple Leafs (1977–78)	0–1–2	L
4	October 20, 1977	5–7	@ Buffalo Sabres (1977–78)	0–2–2	L
5	October 22, 1977	3–0	Chicago Black Hawks (1977–78)	1–2–2	W
6	October 25, 1977	4–4	Boston Bruins (1977–78)	1–2–3	T
7	October 28, 1977	8–1	Washington Capitals (1977–78)	2–2–3	W
8	October 29, 1977	6–2	@ Vancouver Canucks (1977–78)	3–2–3	W

November

Game	Date	Score	Opponent	Record	Recap
9	November 2, 1977	6–2	New York Rangers (1977–78)	4–2–3	W
10	November 5, 1977	2–5	Toronto Maple Leafs (1977–78)	4–3–3	L
11	November 8, 1977	6–2	Vancouver Canucks (1977–78)	5–3–3	W
12	November 11, 1977	1–2	St. Louis Blues (1977–78)	5–4–3	L
13	November 12, 1977	1–3	@ St. Louis Blues (1977–78)	5–5–3	L
14	November 16, 1977	1–4	Montreal Canadiens (1977–78)	5–6–3	L
15	November 19, 1977	7–2	Cleveland Barons (1977–78)	6–6–3	W
16	November 22, 1977	2–4	@ New York Islanders (1977–78)	6–7–3	L
17	November 23, 1977	3–6	@ New York Rangers (1977–78)	6–8–3	L
18	November 25, 1977	1–5	Chicago Black Hawks (1977–78)	6–9–3	L
19	November 26, 1977	4–4	@ Minnesota North Stars (1977–78)	6–9–4	T
20	November 30, 1977	3–3	New York Islanders (1977–78)	6–9–5	T

December

Game	Date	Score	Opponent	Record	Recap
21	December 3, 1977	3–6	Philadelphia Flyers (1977–78)	6–10–5	L
22	December 6, 1977	3–3	Pittsburgh Penguins (1977–78)	6–10–6	T
23	December 9, 1977	2–3	Toronto Maple Leafs (1977–78)	6–11–6	L
24	December 10, 1977	4–6	@ St. Louis Blues (1977–78)	6–12–6	L
25	December 13, 1977	4–1	Buffalo Sabres (1977–78)	7–12–6	W
26	December 17, 1977	5–1	Minnesota North Stars (1977–78)	8–12–6	W
27	December 20, 1977	1–9	@ New York Islanders (1977–78)	8–13–6	L
28	December 21, 1977	3–6	@ Boston Bruins (1977–78)	8–14–6	L
29	December 23, 1977	2–6	Atlanta Flames (1977–78)	8–15–6	L
30	December 27, 1977	2–5	@ Detroit Red Wings (1977–78)	8–16–6	L
31	December 29, 1977	2–2	Los Angeles Kings (1977–78)	8–16–7	T
32	December 30, 1977	2–2	@ Vancouver Canucks (1977–78)	8–16–8	T

January

Game	Date	Score	Opponent	Record	Recap
33	January 1, 1978	1–5	@ Los Angeles Kings (1977–78)	8–17–8	L
34	January 4, 1978	0–5	@ Toronto Maple Leafs (1977–78)	8–18–8	L
35	January 5, 1978	3–5	@ Buffalo Sabres (1977–78)	8–19–8	L
36	January 7, 1978	3–1	New York Rangers (1977–78)	9–19–8	W
37	January 10, 1978	4–7	@ New York Islanders (1977–78)	9–20–8	L
38	January 11, 1978	2–4	@ Atlanta Flames (1977–78)	9–21–8	L
39	January 13, 1978	1–2	St. Louis Blues (1977–78)	9–22–8	L
40	January 14, 1978	3–3	@ Vancouver Canucks (1977–78)	9–22–9	T
41	January 18, 1978	4–4	Detroit Red Wings (1977–78)	9–22–10	T
42	January 20, 1978	5–2	Los Angeles Kings (1977–78)	10–22–10	W
43	January 21, 1978	4–9	@ Cleveland Barons (1977–78)	10–23–10	L
44	January 25, 1978	3–3	@ Washington Capitals (1977–78)	10–23–11	T
45	January 26, 1978	3–4	@ Boston Bruins (1977–78)	10–24–11	L
46	January 28, 1978	6–4	Philadelphia Flyers (1977–78)	11–24–11	W
47	January 31, 1978	3–5	Montreal Canadiens (1977–78)	11–25–11	L

February

Game	Date	Score	Opponent	Record	Recap
48	February 2, 1978	0–3	@ Philadelphia Flyers (1977–78)	11–26–11	L
49	February 4, 1978	2–2	@ Atlanta Flames (1977–78)	11–26–12	T
50	February 5, 1978	3–6	@ New York Rangers (1977–78)	11–27–12	L
51	February 7, 1978	2–4	Pittsburgh Penguins (1977–78)	11–28–12	L
52	February 10, 1978	3–2	Atlanta Flames (1977–78)	12–28–12	W
53	February 12, 1978	3–3	@ Minnesota North Stars (1977–78)	12–28–13	T
54	February 15, 1978	2–2	@ Chicago Black Hawks (1977–78)	12–28–14	T
55	February 16, 1978	4–5	New York Islanders (1977–78)	12–29–14	L
56	February 18, 1978	4–9	@ Montreal Canadiens (1977–78)	12–30–14	L
57	February 19, 1978	4–4	@ New York Rangers (1977–78)	12–30–15	T
58	February 21, 1978	2–3	Boston Bruins (1977–78)	12–31–15	L
59	February 24, 1978	3–2	Minnesota North Stars (1977–78)	13–31–15	W
60	February 25, 1978	5–5	@ St. Louis Blues (1977–78)	13–31–16	T
61	February 28, 1978	4–7	@ Washington Capitals (1977–78)	13–32–16	L

March

Game	Date	Score	Opponent	Record	Recap
62	March 2, 1978	2–5	@ Los Angeles Kings (1977–78)	13–33–16	L
63	March 3, 1978	2–2	Cleveland Barons (1977–78)	13–33–17	T
64	March 5, 1978	2–2	Chicago Black Hawks (1977–78)	13–33–18	T
65	March 8, 1978	3–5	@ Pittsburgh Penguins (1977–78)	13–34–18	L
66	March 11, 1978	4–5	@ Detroit Red Wings (1977–78)	13–35–18	L
67	March 12, 1978	2–6	@ Philadelphia Flyers (1977–78)	13–36–18	L
68	March 14, 1978	4–4	Atlanta Flames (1977–78)	13–36–19	T
69	March 15, 1978	2–2	@ Cleveland Barons (1977–78)	13–36–20	T
70	March 17, 1978	3–1	Vancouver Canucks (1977–78)	14–36–20	W
71	March 19, 1978	6–4	Detroit Red Wings (1977–78)	15–36–20	W
72	March 22, 1978	5–2	@ Pittsburgh Penguins (1977–78)	16–36–20	W
73	March 23, 1978	3–5	@ Montreal Canadiens (1977–78)	16–37–20	L
74	March 25, 1978	3–4	Buffalo Sabres (1977–78)	16–38–20	L
75	March 28, 1978	4–3	Philadelphia Flyers (1977–78)	17–38–20	W
76	March 30, 1978	3–4	Washington Capitals (1977–78)	17–39–20	L

April

Game	Date	Score	Opponent	Record	Recap
77	April 1, 1978	4–2	Minnesota North Stars (1977–78)	18–39–20	W
78	April 4, 1978	3–5	@ Minnesota North Stars (1977–78)	18–40–20	L
79	April 5, 1978	4–4	@ Chicago Black Hawks (1977–78)	18–40–21	T
80	April 8, 1978	5–2	St. Louis Blues (1977–78)	19–40–21	W

Legend: W Win (2 points) L Loss (0 points) T Tie (1 point)

=== Playoffs ===
1978 Stanley Cup playoffs
Preliminary Round vs. (4) Philadelphia Flyers – Flyers win 2–0

Game	Date	Score	Opponent	Series	Recap
1	April 11, 1978	2–3 OT	@ Philadelphia Flyers	Flyers lead 1–0	L
2	April 13, 1978	1–3	Philadelphia Flyers	Flyers win 2–0	L

Legend: W Win L Loss

== Player statistics ==
=== Regular season ===
Scoring

Player	Pos	GP	G	A	Pts	PIM	+/-	PPG	SHG	GWG
Wilf Paiement	RW	80	31	56	87	114	−14	7	2	1
Barry Beck	D	75	22	38	60	89	−14	6	0	4
John Van Boxmeer	D	80	12	42	54	87	−12	5	0	0
Paul Gardner	C	46	30	22	52	29	−17	13	0	3
Andy Spruce	LW	74	19	21	40	43	−7	3	0	1
Gary Croteau	LW	62	17	22	39	24	−15	8	0	0
Ron Andruff	C	78	15	18	33	31	−16	0	0	1
Dave Hudson	C	60	10	22	32	12	−5	1	0	0
Dennis Owchar	D	60	8	23	31	25	−49	2	0	0
Denis Dupere	LW	54	15	15	30	4	9	2	2	4
Joe Contini	C	37	12	9	21	28	−2	3	0	0
Ron Delorme	C	68	10	11	21	47	−20	0	0	0
Nelson Pyatt	C	71	9	12	21	8	−23	1	0	0
Randy Pierce	RW	35	9	10	19	15	0	1	0	3
Mark Suzor	D	60	4	15	19	56	−35	2	0	0
Mike Kitchen	D	61	2	17	19	45	−12	0	0	1
Fred Ahern	RW	38	5	13	18	19	−16	1	0	0
Bryan Lefley	D/LW	71	4	13	17	12	−4	0	1	1
Ralph Klassen	C	44	6	9	15	8	−19	3	0	0
Tom Edur	D	20	5	7	12	10	10	1	0	0
Chuck Arnason	RW	29	4	8	12	10	−3	2	0	0
Mike Christie	D	35	2	8	10	28	−6	0	0	0
Bob Neely	LW	22	3	6	9	2	−10	1	0	0
Larry Skinner	C	14	3	5	8	0	2	1	0	0
Rick Jodzio	LW	32	0	5	5	28	−5	0	0	0
Doug Favell	G	47	0	2	2	2	0	0	0	0
Dennis O'Brien	D	16	0	2	2	12	−10	0	0	0
Roger Lemelin	D	3	0	0	0	0	0	0	0	0
John McCahill	D	1	0	0	0	0	0	0	0	0
Jim McElmury	D	2	0	0	0	0	1	0	0	0
Bill McKenzie	G	12	0	0	0	2	0	0	0	0
Lou Nistico	C	3	0	0	0	0	0	0	0	0
Bill Oleschuk	G	2	0	0	0	0	0	0	0	0
Michel Plasse	G	25	0	0	0	12	0	0	0	0

Goaltending

Player	MIN	GP	W	L	T	GA	GAA	SO
Doug Favell	2663	47	13	20	11	159	3.58	1
Bill McKenzie	654	12	3	6	2	42	3.85	0
Michel Plasse	1383	25	3	12	8	90	3.90	0
Bill Oleschuk	100	2	0	2	0	9	5.40	0
Team:	4800	80	19	40	21	300	3.75	1

=== Playoffs ===
Scoring

Player	Pos	GP	G	A	Pts	PIM	PPG	SHG	GWG
Dave Hudson	C	2	1	1	2	0	0	0	0
Andy Spruce	LW	2	0	2	2	0	0	0	0
Denis Dupere	LW	2	1	0	1	0	1	0	0
Dennis Owchar	D	2	1	0	1	2	0	0	0
Fred Ahern	RW	2	0	1	1	2	0	0	0
Barry Beck	D	2	0	1	1	0	0	0	0
John Van Boxmeer	D	2	0	1	1	2	0	0	0
Ron Andruff	C	2	0	0	0	0	0	0	0
Mike Christie	D	2	0	0	0	0	0	0	0
Joe Contini	C	2	0	0	0	0	0	0	0
Ron Delorme	C	2	0	0	0	10	0	0	0
Doug Favell	G	2	0	0	0	0	0	0	0
Mike Kitchen	D	2	0	0	0	2	0	0	0
Ralph Klassen	C	2	0	0	0	0	0	0	0
Bryan Lefley	D/LW	2	0	0	0	0	0	0	0
Wilf Paiement	RW	2	0	0	0	7	0	0	0
Randy Pierce	RW	2	0	0	0	0	0	0	0
Larry Skinner	C	2	0	0	0	0	0	0	0

Goaltending

Player	MIN	GP	W	L	GA	GAA	SO
Doug Favell	120	2	0	2	6	3.00	0
Team:	120	2	0	2	6	3.00	0

Note: GP = Games played; G = Goals; A = Assists; Pts = Points; +/- = Plus/minus; PIM = Penalty minutes; PPG=Power-play goals; SHG=Short-handed goals; GWG=Game-winning goals
MIN=Minutes played; W = Wins; L = Losses; T = Ties; GA = Goals against; GAA = Goals against average; SO = Shutouts;

== Draft picks ==
Colorado's draft picks at the 1977 NHL amateur draft held at the Mount Royal Hotel in Montreal.

Round	#	Player	Nationality	College/Junior/Club team (League)
1	2	Barry Beck	Canada	New Westminster Bruins (WCHL)
3	38	Doug Berry	Canada	University of Denver (WCHA)
3	47	Randy Pierce	Canada	Sudbury Wolves (OMJHL)
5	74	Mike Dwyer	Canada	Niagara Falls Flyers (OMJHL)
6	92	Dan Lempe	United States	University of Minnesota Duluth (WCHA)
7	110	Rick Doyle	Canada	London Knights (OMJHL)
8	126	Joe Contini	Canada	St. Catharines Fincups (OMJHL)
9	142	Jack Hughes	United States	Harvard University (ECAC)

== See also ==
- 1977–78 NHL season
