= 1977–78 Buffalo Sabres season =

NHL hockey team season

1977–78 Buffalo Sabres
- Division: 2nd Adams
- Conference: 3rd Wales
- 1977–78 record: 44–19–17
- Home record: 25–7–8
- Road record: 19–12–9
- Goals for: 288
- Goals against: 215

Team information
- General manager: Punch Imlach
- Coach: Marcel Pronovost
- Captain: Danny Gare
- Alternate captains: None
- Arena: Buffalo Memorial Auditorium
- Average attendance: 16,433

Team leaders
- Goals: Gilbert Perreault (41)
- Assists: Gilbert Perreault (48)
- Points: Gilbert Perreault (89)
- Penalty minutes: Jerry Korab (119)
- Wins: Don Edwards (38)
- Goals against average: Bob Sauve (2.50)

The 1977–78 Buffalo Sabres season was the Sabres' eighth season of operation for the National Hockey League (NHL) franchise that was established on May 22, 1970.

== Regular season ==
=== Final standings ===
Adams Division
	GP	W	L	T	GF	GA	Pts
**Boston Bruins**	80	51	18	11	333	218	113
**Buffalo Sabres**	80	44	19	17	288	215	105
**Toronto Maple Leafs**	80	41	29	10	271	237	92
Cleveland Barons	80	22	45	13	230	325	57

Note: GP = Games played, W = Wins, L = Losses, T = Ties, Pts = Points, GF = Goals for, GA = Goals against
Note: Teams that qualified for the playoffs are highlighted in bold.

=== Record vs. opponents ===
Adams Division record vs. opponents

**Vs. Wales Conference**

**Vs. Campbell Conference**

**Vs. Adams Division**

1977–78 NHL records
Team	**BOS**	**BUF**	**CLE**	**TOR**	**Total**
Boston	—	2–4	3–1–2	5–0–1	**10–5–3**
Buffalo	4–2	—	4–2	2–3–1	**10–7–1**
Cleveland	1–3–2	2–4	—	2–4	**5–13–2**
Toronto	0–5–1	3–2–1	4–2	—	**7–9–2**

**Vs. Norris Division**

1977–78 NHL records
Team	**DET**	**LAK**	**MTL**	**PIT**	**WSH**	**Total**
Boston	4–0–1	5–0	0–4–1	5–0	4–0–1	**18–4–3**
Buffalo	2–2–1	3–0–2	3–2	0–0–5	3–1–1	**11–5–9**
Cleveland	2–2–1	1–3–1	1–4	0–5	2–3	**6–17–2**
Toronto	2–1–2	2–3	0–4–1	2–3	4–0–1	**10–11–4**

**Vs. Patrick Division**

1977–78 NHL records
Team	**ATL**	**NYI**	**NYR**	**PHI**	**Total**
Boston	2–1–1	1–3	4–1	1–2–1	**8–7–2**
Buffalo	2–1–1	3–2	2–1–1	3–0–1	**10–4–3**
Cleveland	1–2–1	1–1–2	1–3	0–4–1	**3–10–4**
Toronto	2–3	1–3	3–1	3–1	**9–8–0**

**Vs. Smythe Division**

1977–78 NHL records
Team	**CHI**	**COL**	**MIN**	**STL**	**VAN**	**Total**
Boston	3–1	3–0–1	3–1	4–0	2–0–2	**15–2–3**
Buffalo	2–1–1	3–1	3–1	4–0	1–0–3	**13–3–4**
Cleveland	1–3	1–1–2	3–0–1	1–2–1	2–1–1	**8–7–5**
Toronto	2–1–1	4–0	4–0	2–0–2	3–0–1	**15–1–4**

== Schedule and results ==
1977–78 regular season
October

Game	Result	Date	Score	Opponent	Record
1	W	October 13, 1977	3–2	New York Islanders (1977–78)	1–0–0
2	W	October 15, 1977	5–2	@ Toronto Maple Leafs (1977–78)	2–0–0
3	L	October 16, 1977	0–2	Chicago Black Hawks (1977–78)	2–1–0
4	T	October 19, 1977	2–2	@ Chicago Black Hawks (1977–78)	2–1–1
5	W	October 20, 1977	7–5	Colorado Rockies (1977–78)	3–1–1
6	W	October 23, 1977	4–1	Minnesota North Stars (1977–78)	4–1–1
7	L	October 29, 1977	2–4	@ New York Islanders (1977–78)	4–2–1
8	W	October 30, 1977	4–0	@ Montreal Canadiens (1977–78)	5–2–1

November

Game	Result	Date	Score	Opponent	Record
9	W	November 3, 1977	4–1	@ Boston Bruins (1977–78)	6–2–1
10	W	November 5, 1977	3–1	@ St. Louis Blues (1977–78)	7–2–1
11	W	November 6, 1977	7–4	St. Louis Blues (1977–78)	8–2–1
12	L	November 9, 1977	4–8	@ New York Rangers (1977–78)	8–3–1
13	W	November 10, 1977	3–2	@ Philadelphia Flyers (1977–78)	9–3–1
14	T	November 13, 1977	3–3	Pittsburgh Penguins (1977–78)	9–3–2
15	W	November 16, 1977	6–2	@ Atlanta Flames (1977–78)	10–3–2
16	L	November 17, 1977	1–2	Toronto Maple Leafs (1977–78)	10–4–2
17	W	November 19, 1977	7–6	@ Washington Capitals (1977–78)	11–4–2
18	W	November 20, 1977	5–2	Washington Capitals (1977–78)	12–4–2
19	L	November 23, 1977	0–2	Boston Bruins (1977–78)	12–5–2
20	L	November 24, 1977	1–4	@ Montreal Canadiens (1977–78)	12–6–2
21	W	November 27, 1977	3–2	New York Rangers (1977–78)	13–6–2
22	W	November 30, 1977	3–2	@ Chicago Black Hawks (1977–78)	14–6–2

December

Game	Result	Date	Score	Opponent	Record
23	W	December 1, 1977	3–1	Montreal Canadiens (1977–78)	15–6–2
24	T	December 3, 1977	4–4	@ Pittsburgh Penguins (1977–78)	15–6–3
25	W	December 4, 1977	6–1	Detroit Red Wings (1977–78)	16–6–3
26	W	December 8, 1977	5–2	Cleveland Barons (1977–78)	17–6–3
27	W	December 10, 1977	4–2	@ Minnesota North Stars (1977–78)	18–6–3
28	W	December 11, 1977	3–0	Vancouver Canucks (1977–78)	19–6–3
29	L	December 13, 1977	1–4	@ Colorado Rockies (1977–78)	19–7–3
30	W	December 15, 1977	7–3	@ Los Angeles Kings (1977–78)	20–7–3
31	T	December 17, 1977	5–5	@ Vancouver Canucks (1977–78)	20–7–4
32	W	December 21, 1977	5–3	@ Detroit Red Wings (1977–78)	21–7–4
33	T	December 22, 1977	3–3	Pittsburgh Penguins (1977–78)	21–7–5
34	T	December 29, 1977	3–3	Detroit Red Wings (1977–78)	21–7–6
35	T	December 31, 1977	2–2	@ New York Rangers (1977–78)	21–7–7

January

Game	Result	Date	Score	Opponent	Record
36	T	January 1, 1978	2–2	Atlanta Flames (1977–78)	21–7–8
37	W	January 5, 1978	5–3	Colorado Rockies (1977–78)	22–7–8
38	T	January 7, 1978	4–4	@ Washington Capitals (1977–78)	22–7–9
39	W	January 8, 1978	5–3	Boston Bruins (1977–78)	23–7–9
40	T	January 11, 1978	3–3	Los Angeles Kings (1977–78)	23–7–10
41	L	January 12, 1978	3–6	@ Cleveland Barons (1977–78)	23–8–10
42	L	January 14, 1978	2–6	@ Detroit Red Wings (1977–78)	23–9–10
43	W	January 19, 1978	9–2	Cleveland Barons (1977–78)	24–9–10
44	W	January 21, 1978	3–1	@ St. Louis Blues (1977–78)	25–9–10
45	T	January 22, 1978	2–2	Vancouver Canucks (1977–78)	25–9–11
46	L	January 26, 1978	1–2	Minnesota North Stars (1977–78)	25–10–11
47	T	January 28, 1978	3–3	@ Pittsburgh Penguins (1977–78)	25–10–12
48	W	January 30, 1978	3–2	New York Islanders (1977–78)	26–10–12

February

Game	Result	Date	Score	Opponent	Record
49	T	February 1, 1978	2–2	@ Toronto Maple Leafs (1977–78)	26–10–13
50	W	February 2, 1978	3–1	Boston Bruins (1977–78)	27–10–13
51	W	February 4, 1978	4–2	@ Minnesota North Stars (1977–78)	28–10–13
52	W	February 5, 1978	4–1	Washington Capitals (1977–78)	29–10–13
53	W	February 8, 1978	5–2	@ Cleveland Barons (1977–78)	30–10–13
54	W	February 9, 1978	2–0	New York Rangers (1977–78)	31–10–13
55	L	February 13, 1978	2–4	Toronto Maple Leafs (1977–78)	31–11–13
56	W	February 16, 1978	5–0	Los Angeles Kings (1977–78)	32–11–13
57	W	February 19, 1978	6–2	St. Louis Blues (1977–78)	33–11–13
58	L	February 20, 1978	2–4	@ Montreal Canadiens (1977–78)	33–12–13
59	W	February 23, 1978	4–0	Philadelphia Flyers (1977–78)	34–12–13
60	W	February 25, 1978	13–3	@ Cleveland Barons (1977–78)	35–12–13
61	T	February 26, 1978	4–4	Pittsburgh Penguins (1977–78)	35–12–14

March

Game	Result	Date	Score	Opponent	Record
62	W	March 1, 1978	4–3	@ Atlanta Flames (1977–78)	36–12–14
63	W	March 2, 1978	6–3	New York Islanders (1977–78)	37–12–14
64	L	March 4, 1978	3–7	@ Boston Bruins (1977–78)	37–13–14
65	W	March 6, 1978	2–1	Montreal Canadiens (1977–78)	38–13–14
66	T	March 9, 1978	3–3	Los Angeles Kings (1977–78)	38–13–15
67	L	March 11, 1978	2–4	@ New York Islanders (1977–78)	38–14–15
68	W	March 12, 1978	5–2	Chicago Black Hawks (1977–78)	39–14–15
69	W	March 16, 1978	3–1	Philadelphia Flyers (1977–78)	40–14–15
70	T	March 18, 1978	2–2	@ Philadelphia Flyers (1977–78)	40–14–16
71	W	March 21, 1978	6–2	@ Los Angeles Kings (1977–78)	41–14–16
72	T	March 24, 1978	2–2	@ Vancouver Canucks (1977–78)	41–14–17
73	W	March 25, 1978	4–3	@ Colorado Rockies (1977–78)	42–14–17
74	L	March 28, 1978	0–7	@ Detroit Red Wings (1977–78)	42–15–17
75	L	March 30, 1978	3–5	Cleveland Barons (1977–78)	42–16–17

April

Game	Result	Date	Score	Opponent	Record
76	L	April 1, 1978	2–3	@ Toronto Maple Leafs (1977–78)	42–17–17
77	L	April 2, 1978	2–4	Atlanta Flames (1977–78)	42–18–17
78	L	April 4, 1978	3–4	@ Washington Capitals (1977–78)	42–19–17
79	W	April 6, 1978	5–2	@ Boston Bruins (1977–78)	43–19–17
80	W	April 9, 1978	2–1	Toronto Maple Leafs (1977–78)	44–19–17

Legend: Win (2 points) Loss (0 points) Tie (1 point)

== Playoffs ==
=== Preliminary round vs. New York Rangers ===
April 11	New York Rangers	1–4	Buffalo Sabres	Buffalo Memorial Auditorium	Recap
No scoring		First period	16:41 – Gilbert Perrault (1)
No scoring		Second period	12:28 – Richard Martin (1)
Steve Vickers (1) – 02:35		Third period	08:33 – Jocelyn Guevremont (1); 17:50 – Gary McAdam (1)
Wayne Thomas		Goalie stats	Don Edwards

April 13	Buffalo Sabres	3–4	OT	New York Rangers	Madison Square Garden	Recap
Rene Robert (1) – 03:06; Derek Smith (1) – 16:29		First period		14:36 – Steve Vickers (2); 19:59 – Pat Hickey (1)
Danny Gare (1) – pp – 18:04		Second period		15:07 – pp – Ron Duguay (1)
No scoring		Third period		No scoring
No scoring		First overtime period		01:37 – Don Murdoch (1)
Don Edwards		Goalie stats		John Davidson

April 15	New York Rangers	1–4	Buffalo Sabres	Buffalo Memorial Auditorium	Recap
No scoring		First period	No scoring
Pat Hickey (2) – pp – 19:18		Second period	08:04 – Gilbert Perreault (2); 14:23 – pp – Craig Ramsay (1); 15:56 – Danny Gare (2)
No scoring		Third period	10:32 – Rene Robert (2)
Wayne Thomas		Goalie stats	Don Edwards

Buffalo won series 2–1

=== Quarterfinals vs. Philadelphia Flyers ===
April 17	Buffalo Sabres	1–4	Philadelphia Flyers	Spectrum	Recap
Terry Martin (1) – 06:34		First period	06:19 – pp – Rick MacLeish (2)
No scoring		Second period	01:08 – Bob Kelly (2); 06:13 – Rick MacLeish (3)
No scoring		Third period	01:28 – Bill Barber (1)
Don Edwards 24 saves / 28 shots		Goalie stats	Bernie Parent 24 saves / 25 shots

April 19	Buffalo Sabres	2–3	Philadelphia Flyers	Spectrum	Recap
Richard Martin (2) – pp – 11:58		First period	07:16 – pp – Bill Barber (2)
Danny Gare (3) – pp – 14:20		Second period	04:09 – Andre Dupont (1); 10:31 – Rick MacLeish (4)
No scoring		Third period	No scoring
Don Edwards 31 saves / 34 shots		Goalie stats	Bernie Parent 20 saves / 22 shots

April 22	Philadelphia Flyers	1–4	Buffalo Sabres	Buffalo Memorial Auditorium	Recap
Rick MacLeish (5) – pp – 08:36		First period	No scoring
No scoring		Second period	09:18 – Gary McAdam (2)
No scoring		Third period	00:43 – Gilbert Perreault (3); 03:17 – Derek Smith (2); 12:25 – Danny Gare (4)
Bernie Parent 29 saves / 33 shots		Goalie stats	Don Edwards 20 saves / 21 shots

April 23	Philadelphia Flyers	4–2	Buffalo Sabres	Buffalo Memorial Auditorium	Recap
Bob Kelly (3) – 05:56; Ross Lonsberry (1) – pp – 08:02; Rick MacLeish (6) – 14:13		First period	15:13 – Craig Ramsay (2)
No scoring		Second period	No scoring
Bill Barber (3) – 14:59		Third period	16:57 – Craig Ramsay (3)
Bernie Parent 31 saves / 33 shots		Goalie stats	Don Edwards 23 saves / 27 shots

April 25	Buffalo Sabres	2–4	Philadelphia Flyers	Spectrum	Recap
No scoring		First period	13:43 – pp – Bobby Clarke (2)
Terry Martin (2) – 10:53		Second period	11:07 – Paul Holmgren (1); 14:34 – Ross Lonsberry (2)
Derek Smith (3) – 13:04		Third period	06:59 – Don Saleski (2)
Don Edwards 22 saves / 26 shots		Goalie stats	Bernie Parent 26 saves / 28 shots

Philadelphia won series 4–1

== Draft picks ==
Buffalo's draft picks at the 1977 NHL amateur draft held at the Mount Royal Hotel in Montreal.

Round	#	Player	Nationality	College/Junior/Club team (League)
1	14	Ric Seiling	Canada	St. Catharines Fincups (OHA)
2	32	Ron Areshenkoff	Canada	Medicine Hat Tigers (WCHL)
4	68	Bill Stewart	Canada	Niagara Falls Flyers (OMJHL)
5	86	Rich Sirois	Canada	Laval National (QMJHL)
6	104	Wayne Ramsey	Canada	Brandon Wheat Kings (WCHL)

== See also ==
- 1977–78 NHL season
