= 1977–78 Los Angeles Kings season =

National Hockey League team season

1977–78 Los Angeles Kings
- Division: 3rd Norris
- Conference: 6th Wales
- 1977–78 record: 31–34–15
- Home record: 18–16–6
- Road record: 13–18–9
- Goals for: 243
- Goals against: 245

Team information
- General manager: George Maguire
- Coach: Ron Stewart
- Captain: Mike Murphy
- Alternate captains: None
- Arena: Los Angeles Forum

Team leaders
- Goals: Butch Goring (37)
- Assists: Marcel Dionne (43)
- Points: Marcel Dionne (79)
- Penalty minutes: Bert Wilson (127)
- Wins: Rogie Vachon (29)
- Goals against average: Rogie Vachon (2.87)

The 1977–78 Los Angeles Kings season was the Kings' 11th season in the National Hockey League (NHL).

== Regular season ==
=== Final standings ===
Norris Division
	GP	W	L	T	GF	GA	Pts
**Montreal Canadiens**	80	59	10	11	359	183	129
**Detroit Red Wings**	80	32	34	14	252	266	78
**Los Angeles Kings**	80	31	34	15	243	245	77
Pittsburgh Penguins	80	25	37	18	254	321	68
Washington Capitals	80	17	49	14	195	321	48

Note: GP = Games played, W = Wins, L = Losses, T = Ties, Pts = Points, GF = Goals for, GA = Goals against
Note: Teams that qualified for the playoffs are highlighted in bold.

=== Record vs. opponents ===
Norris Division record vs. opponents

**Vs. Wales Conference**

**Vs. Campbell Conference**

**Vs. Norris Division**

1977–78 NHL records
Team	**DET**	**LAK**	**MTL**	**PIT**	**WSH**	**Total**
Detroit	—	3–2–1	1–4–1	3–2–1	4–1–1	**11–9–4**
Los Angeles	2–3–1	—	1–4–1	3–0–3	4–2	**10–9–5**
Montreal	4–1–1	4–1–1	—	5–1	5–0–1	**18–3–3**
Pittsburgh	2–3–1	0–3–3	1–5	—	1–4–1	**4–15–5**
Washington	1–4–1	2–4	0–5–1	4–1–1	—	**7–12–5**

**Vs. Adams Division**

1977–78 NHL records
Team	**BOS**	**BUF**	**CLE**	**TOR**	**Total**
Detroit	0–4–1	2–2–1	2–2–1	1–2–2	**5–10–5**
Los Angeles	0–5	0–3–2	3–1–1	3–2	**6–11–3**
Montreal	4–0–1	2–3	4–1	4–0–1	**14–4–2**
Pittsburgh	0–5	0–0–5	5–0	3–2	**8–7–5**
Washington	0–4–1	1–3–1	3–2	0–4–1	**4–13–3**

**Vs. Patrick Division**

1977–78 NHL records
Team	**ATL**	**NYI**	**NYR**	**PHI**	**Total**
Detroit	2–1–1	0–4	1–2–1	1–2–1	**4–9–3**
Los Angeles	2–1–1	0–2–2	3–1	0–3–1	**5–7–4**
Montreal	2–0–2	4–0	3–1	2–0–2	**11–1–4**
Pittsburgh	1–3	1–2–1	2–0–2	0–3–1	**4–8–4**
Washington	2–1–1	0–4	0–2–2	0–4	**2–11–3**

**Vs. Smythe Division**

1977–78 NHL records
Team	**CHI**	**COL**	**MIN**	**STL**	**VAN**	**Total**
Detroit	1–3	2–1–1	4–0	3–1	2–1–1	**12–6–2**
Los Angeles	2–2	2–1–1	2–1–1	2–2	2–1–1	**10–7–3**
Montreal	3–0–1	4–0	2–2	4–0	3–0–1	**16–2–2**
Pittsburgh	2–1–1	2–1–1	2–2	2–1–1	1–2–1	**9–7–4**
Washington	0–3–1	2–1–1	1–2–1	1–1–2	0–4	**4–11–5**

== Schedule and results ==
1977–78 regular season
October

Game	Result	Date	Score	Opponent	Record
1	W	October 12, 1977	2–0	Cleveland Barons (1977–78)	1–0–0
2	W	October 15, 1977	4–2	Detroit Red Wings (1977–78)	2–0–0
3	T	October 18, 1977	0–0	@ New York Islanders (1977–78)	2–0–1
4	L	October 19, 1977	1–3	@ Cleveland Barons (1977–78)	2–1–1
5	L	October 22, 1977	3–4	Boston Bruins (1977–78)	2–2–1
6	L	October 25, 1977	1–3	@ Vancouver Canucks (1977–78)	2–3–1
7	T	October 26, 1977	2–2	New York Islanders (1977–78)	2–3–2
8	W	October 29, 1977	5–3	@ Montreal Canadiens (1977–78)	3–3–2
9	W	October 30, 1977	5–3	@ New York Rangers (1977–78)	4–3–2

November

Game	Result	Date	Score	Opponent	Record
10	L	November 1, 1977	2–7	@ St. Louis Blues (1977–78)	4–4–2
11	W	November 3, 1977	4–2	Toronto Maple Leafs (1977–78)	5–4–2
12	W	November 5, 1977	3–1	New York Rangers (1977–78)	6–4–2
13	W	November 8, 1977	5–1	@ Washington Capitals (1977–78)	7–4–2
14	L	November 10, 1977	2–5	@ Boston Bruins (1977–78)	7–5–2
15	T	November 12, 1977	2–2	Minnesota North Stars (1977–78)	7–5–3
16	T	November 16, 1977	1–1	Cleveland Barons (1977–78)	7–5–4
17	L	November 19, 1977	2–4	Montreal Canadiens (1977–78)	7–6–4
18	W	November 23, 1977	8–3	Chicago Black Hawks (1977–78)	8–6–4
19	W	November 24, 1977	5–3	Pittsburgh Penguins (1977–78)	9–6–4
20	T	November 26, 1977	4–4	@ Atlanta Flames (1977–78)	9–6–5
21	L	November 27, 1977	0–2	@ Philadelphia Flyers (1977–78)	9–7–5
22	W	November 29, 1977	4–2	Washington Capitals (1977–78)	10–7–5

December

Game	Result	Date	Score	Opponent	Record
23	L	December 1, 1977	2–4	Philadelphia Flyers (1977–78)	10–8–5
24	W	December 3, 1977	4–1	Atlanta Flames (1977–78)	11–8–5
25	W	December 6, 1977	6–1	@ St. Louis Blues (1977–78)	12–8–5
26	W	December 8, 1977	5–3	@ Pittsburgh Penguins (1977–78)	13–8–5
27	L	December 10, 1977	0–3	Toronto Maple Leafs (1977–78)	13–9–5
28	L	December 15, 1977	3–7	Buffalo Sabres (1977–78)	13–10–5
29	L	December 17, 1977	1–2	Washington Capitals (1977–78)	13–11–5
30	W	December 19, 1977	3–2	Vancouver Canucks (1977–78)	14–11–5
31	W	December 21, 1977	8–1	Minnesota North Stars (1977–78)	15–11–5
32	W	December 22, 1977	4–0	@ Chicago Black Hawks (1977–78)	16–11–5
33	L	December 28, 1977	3–4	New York Islanders (1977–78)	16–12–5
34	T	December 29, 1977	2–2	@ Colorado Rockies (1977–78)	16–12–6

January

Game	Result	Date	Score	Opponent	Record
35	W	January 1, 1978	5–1	Colorado Rockies (1977–78)	17–12–6
36	L	January 4, 1978	0–4	@ Washington Capitals (1977–78)	17–13–6
37	T	January 5, 1978	4–4	@ Philadelphia Flyers (1977–78)	17–13–7
38	T	January 7, 1978	3–3	@ Pittsburgh Penguins (1977–78)	17–13–8
39	L	January 8, 1978	3–4	@ Detroit Red Wings (1977–78)	17–14–8
40	T	January 11, 1978	3–3	@ Buffalo Sabres (1977–78)	17–14–9
41	L	January 12, 1978	1–6	@ Boston Bruins (1977–78)	17–15–9
42	W	January 14, 1978	8–4	@ Atlanta Flames (1977–78)	18–15–9
43	L	January 18, 1978	0–3	New York Rangers (1977–78)	18–16–9
44	L	January 20, 1978	2–5	@ Colorado Rockies (1977–78)	18–17–9
45	W	January 21, 1978	2–1	Toronto Maple Leafs (1977–78)	19–17–9
46	W	January 26, 1978	5–1	St. Louis Blues (1977–78)	20–17–9
47	L	January 28, 1978	3–6	@ Montreal Canadiens (1977–78)	20–18–9
48	W	January 29, 1978	4–1	@ New York Rangers (1977–78)	21–18–9

February

Game	Result	Date	Score	Opponent	Record
49	W	February 1, 1978	8–3	Washington Capitals (1977–78)	22–18–9
50	T	February 4, 1978	5–5	Montreal Canadiens (1977–78)	22–18–10
51	L	February 7, 1978	1–2	Detroit Red Wings (1977–78)	22–19–10
52	L	February 9, 1978	2–4	Atlanta Flames (1977–78)	22–20–10
53	T	February 11, 1978	3–3	Pittsburgh Penguins (1977–78)	22–20–11
54	L	February 14, 1978	2–3	@ New York Islanders (1977–78)	22–21–11
55	L	February 16, 1978	0–5	@ Buffalo Sabres (1977–78)	22–22–11
56	T	February 18, 1978	1–1	@ Pittsburgh Penguins (1977–78)	22–22–12
57	L	February 19, 1978	1–5	@ Detroit Red Wings (1977–78)	22–23–12
58	W	February 21, 1978	4–1	@ Washington Capitals (1977–78)	23–23–12
59	L	February 22, 1978	1–4	@ Minnesota North Stars (1977–78)	23–24–12
60	L	February 25, 1978	2–4	Boston Bruins (1977–78)	23–25–12
61	W	February 28, 1978	4–2	Cleveland Barons (1977–78)	24–25–12

March

Game	Result	Date	Score	Opponent	Record
62	W	March 2, 1978	5–2	Colorado Rockies (1977–78)	25–25–12
63	L	March 4, 1978	3–6	Chicago Black Hawks (1977–78)	25–26–12
64	W	March 8, 1978	5–1	@ Toronto Maple Leafs (1977–78)	26–26–12
65	T	March 9, 1978	3–3	@ Buffalo Sabres (1977–78)	26–26–13
66	L	March 11, 1978	3–5	@ Montreal Canadiens (1977–78)	26–27–13
67	L	March 12, 1978	3–9	@ Boston Bruins (1977–78)	26–28–13
68	W	March 14, 1978	4–2	Pittsburgh Penguins (1977–78)	27–28–13
69	T	March 16, 1978	3–3	Detroit Red Wings (1977–78)	27–28–14
70	L	March 18, 1978	3–6	Montreal Canadiens (1977–78)	27–29–14
71	L	March 21, 1978	2–6	Buffalo Sabres (1977–78)	27–30–14
72	W	March 23, 1978	3–1	@ Minnesota North Stars (1977–78)	28–30–14
73	W	March 24, 1978	4–3	@ Cleveland Barons (1977–78)	29–30–14
74	L	March 27, 1978	0–3	@ Toronto Maple Leafs (1977–78)	29–31–14
75	L	March 29, 1978	1–5	@ Chicago Black Hawks (1977–78)	29–32–14
76	W	March 30, 1978	4–0	@ Detroit Red Wings (1977–78)	30–32–14

April

Game	Result	Date	Score	Opponent	Record
77	L	April 1, 1978	2–4	Philadelphia Flyers (1977–78)	30–33–14
78	L	April 5, 1978	2–3	St. Louis Blues (1977–78)	30–34–14
79	T	April 7, 1978	5–5	@ Vancouver Canucks (1977–78)	30–34–15
80	W	April 8, 1978	5–3	Vancouver Canucks (1977–78)	31–34–15

Legend: Win (2 points) Loss (0 points) Tie (1 point)

== Transactions ==
The Kings were involved in the following transactions during the 1977–78 season.

=== Trades ===
May 23, 1977	To Los Angeles Kings Randy Manery	To Atlanta Flames Ab DeMarco Jr.
June 17, 1977	To Los Angeles Kings Steve Short	To Philadelphia Flyers Future considerations
November 2, 1977	To Los Angeles Kings Syl Apps Jr. Hartland Monahan	To Pittsburgh Penguins Dave Schultz; Gene Carr; 4th round pick in 1978 – Shane Pearsall
November 21, 1977	To Los Angeles Kings Larry Carriere	To Vancouver Canucks Sheldon Kannegiesser
January 9, 1978	To Los Angeles Kings Danny Grant	To Detroit Red Wings Barry Long; 3rd round pick in 1978 – Doug Derkson
January 14, 1978	To Los Angeles Kings 2nd round pick in 1980 – Greg Terrion	To St. Louis Blues Neil Komadoski
March 13, 1978	To Los Angeles Kings Darryl Edestrand	To Boston Bruins Cash

=== Free agent signings ===
August 8, 1977	From Cleveland Barons Charlie Simmer
August 31, 1977	From New York Rangers Pete Stemkowski
September 16, 1977	From Minnesota North Stars Ernie Hicke

== Draft picks ==
Los Angeles's draft picks at the 1977 NHL amateur draft held at the Mount Royal Hotel in Montreal.

Round	#	Player	Nationality	College/Junior/Club team (League)
5	84	Julian Baretta	Canada	University of Wisconsin (WCHA)
5	85	Warren Holmes	Canada	Ottawa 67's (OMJHL)
6	103	Randy Rudnyk	Canada	New Westminster Bruins (WCHL)
7	120	Bob Suter	United States	University of Wisconsin (WCHA)

== See also ==
- 1977–78 NHL season
