= 1977–78 Minnesota North Stars season =

National Hockey League team season

1977–78 Minnesota North Stars
- Division: 5th Smythe
- Conference: 10th Campbell
- 1977–78 record: 18–53–9
- Home record: 12–24–4
- Road record: 6–29–5
- Goals for: 218
- Goals against: 325

Team information
- General manager: Jack Gordon (Oct–Feb); Lou Nanne (Feb–Apr)
- Coach: Ted Harris; Andre Beaulieu; Lou Nanne
- Captain: Nick Beverley
- Alternate captains: None
- Arena: Met Center

Team leaders
- Goals: Tim Young (23)
- Assists: Roland Eriksson (39)
- Points: Roland Eriksson (60)
- Penalty minutes: Jerry Engele (105)
- Plus/minus: Bryan Maxwell (+2)
- Wins: Pete LoPresti (12)
- Goals against average: Paul Harrison (3.82)

The 1977–78 Minnesota North Stars season was the 11th season for the North Stars. The North Stars were in financial trouble, and at season's end had the worst record in the league at 18–53–9. In June 1978, with both the North Stars and the Cleveland Barons on the verge of folding, the league approved an arrangement in which the two teams were permitted to merge under the ownership of Barons owner George Gund III. The merged franchise continued as the Minnesota North Stars, but assumed the Barons' old place in the Adams Division.

== Offseason ==
=== NHL draft ===
Round	Pick	Player	Nationality	College/junior/club team
1	7	Brad Maxwell	Canada	New Westminster Bruins (WCHL)
2	25	Dave Semenko	Canada	Brandon Wheat Kings (WCHL)
4	61	Kevin McCloskey	Canada	Calgary Wranglers (WCHL)
5	79	Bob Parent	Canada	Kingston Canadians (OMJHL)
6	97	Jamie Gallimore	Canada	Kamloops Chiefs (WCHL)
7	115	Jean-Pierre Sanvido	Canada	Trois-Rivières Draveurs (QMJHL)
8	130	Greg Tebbutt	Canada	Regina Pats (WCHL)
9	145	Keith Hanson	United States	Dallas Stars Elite AAA (MWJHL)

== Regular season ==
=== Final standings ===
Smythe Division
	GP	W	L	T	GF	GA	Pts
**Chicago Black Hawks**	80	32	29	19	230	220	83
**Colorado Rockies**	80	19	40	21	257	305	59
Vancouver Canucks	80	20	43	17	239	320	57
St. Louis Blues	80	20	47	13	195	304	53
Minnesota North Stars	80	18	53	9	218	325	45

Note: GP = Games played, W = Wins, L = Losses, T = Ties, Pts = Points, GF = Goals for, GA = Goals against
Note: Teams that qualified for the playoffs are highlighted in bold.

=== Record vs. opponents ===
Smythe Division record vs. opponents

**Vs. Campbell Conference**

**Vs. Wales Conference**

**Vs. Smythe Division**

1977–78 NHL records
Team	**CHI**	**COL**	**MIN**	**STL**	**VAN**	**Total**
Chicago	—	1–1–4	5–0–1	3–1–2	2–3–1	**11–5–8**
Colorado	1–1–4	—	3–1–2	1–4–1	3–0–3	**8–6–10**
Minnesota	0–5–1	1–3–2	—	1–4–1	3–3	**5–15–4**
St. Louis	1–3–2	4–1–1	4–1–1	—	3–3	**12–8–4**
Vancouver	3–2–1	0–3–3	3–3	3–3	—	**9–11–4**

**Vs. Patrick Division**

1977–78 NHL records
Team	**ATL**	**NYI**	**NYR**	**PHI**	**Total**
Chicago	2–1–2	1–2–2	1–3–1	2–2–1	**6–8–6**
Colorado	1–2–2	0–4–1	2–2–1	2–3	**5–11–4**
Minnesota	1–4	1–4	0–3–2	2–3	**4–14–2**
St. Louis	0–4–1	0–4–1	0–4–1	1–4	**1–16–3**
Vancouver	1–2–2	0–5	1–4	0–5	**2–16–2**

**Vs. Adams Division**

1977–78 NHL records
Team	**BOS**	**BUF**	**CLE**	**TOR**	**Total**
Chicago	1–3	1–2–1	3–1	1–2–1	**6–8–2**
Colorado	0–3–1	1–3	1–1–2	0–4	**2–11–3**
Minnesota	1–3	1–3	0–3–1	0–4	**2–13–1**
St. Louis	0–4	0–4	2–1–1	0–2–2	**2–11–3**
Vancouver	0–2–2	0–1–3	1–2–1	0–3–1	**1–8–7**

**Vs. Norris Division**

1977–78 NHL records
Team	**DET**	**LAK**	**MTL**	**PIT**	**WSH**	**Total**
Chicago	3–1	2–2	0–3–1	1–2–1	3–0–1	**9–8–3**
Colorado	1–2–1	1–2–1	0–4	1–2–1	1–2–1	**4–12–4**
Minnesota	0–4	1–2–1	2–2	2–2	2–1–1	**7–11–2**
St. Louis	1–3	2–2	0–4	1–2–1	1–1–2	**5–12–3**
Vancouver	1–2–1	1–2–1	0–3–1	2–1–1	4–0	**8–8–4**

== Schedule and results ==
1977–78 regular season
October

Game	Result	Date	Score	Opponent	Record
1	L	October 12, 1977	3–7	@ Montreal Canadiens(1977–78)	0–1–0
2	L	October 15, 1977	3–5	Vancouver Canucks(1977–78)	0–2–0
3	L	October 19, 1977	1–5	@ Atlanta Flames(1977–78)	0–3–0
4	L	October 20, 1977	4–7	Cleveland Barons(1977–78)	0–4–0
5	L	October 22, 1977	2–4	Detroit Red Wings(1977–78)	0–5–0
6	L	October 23, 1977	1–4	@ Buffalo Sabres(1977–78)	0–6–0
7	W	October 26, 1977	3–0	Boston Bruins(1977–78)	1–6–0
8	L	October 27, 1977	1–3	@ Detroit Red Wings(1977–78)	1–7–0
9	W	October 29, 1977	7–4	Washington Capitals(1977–78)	2–7–0

November

Game	Result	Date	Score	Opponent	Record
10	W	November 2, 1977	3–2	New York Islanders(1977–78)	3–7–0
11	L	November 5, 1977	2–5	Chicago Black Hawks(1977–78)	3–8–0
12	W	November 7, 1977	5–3	@ Montreal Canadiens(1977–78)	4–8–0
13	T	November 9, 1977	2–2	@ Chicago Black Hawks(1977–78)	4–8–1
14	L	November 11, 1977	2–4	@ Vancouver Canucks(1977–78)	4–9–1
15	T	November 12, 1977	2–2	@ Los Angeles Kings(1977–78)	4–9–2
16	W	November 16, 1977	7–4	Pittsburgh Penguins(1977–78)	5–9–2
17	L	November 19, 1977	2–7	Philadelphia Flyers(1977–78)	5–10–2
18	L	November 22, 1977	2–4	@ Atlanta Flames(1977–78)	5–11–2
19	L	November 23, 1977	2–9	New York Islanders(1977–78)	5–12–2
20	T	November 26, 1977	4–4	Colorado Rockies(1977–78)	5–12–3
21	W	November 29, 1977	4–3	Atlanta Flames(1977–78)	6–12–3

December

Game	Result	Date	Score	Opponent	Record
22	L	December 1, 1977	2–4	@ Boston Bruins(1977–78)	6–13–3
23	L	December 3, 1977	0–4	New York Rangers(1977–78)	6–14–3
24	T	December 4, 1977	4–4	@ New York Rangers(1977–78)	6–14–4
25	L	December 6, 1977	2–4	@ New York Islanders(1977–78)	6–15–4
26	L	December 7, 1977	3–6	@ Toronto Maple Leafs(1977–78)	6–16–4
27	L	December 10, 1977	2–4	Buffalo Sabres(1977–78)	6–17–4
28	L	December 11, 1977	3–8	@ Chicago Black Hawks(1977–78)	6–18–4
29	W	December 14, 1977	3–2	Montreal Canadiens(1977–78)	7–18–4
30	L	December 16, 1977	5–8	Toronto Maple Leafs(1977–78)	7–19–4
31	L	December 17, 1977	1–5	@ Colorado Rockies(1977–78)	7–20–4
32	L	December 21, 1977	1–8	@ Los Angeles Kings(1977–78)	7–21–4
33	W	December 23, 1977	7–5	@ Vancouver Canucks(1977–78)	8–21–4
34	W	December 27, 1977	1–0	St. Louis Blues(1977–78)	9–21–4
35	L	December 29, 1977	2–5	@ Philadelphia Flyers(1977–78)	9–22–4

January

Game	Result	Date	Score	Opponent	Record
36	L	January 4, 1978	3–5	New York Rangers(1977–78)	9–23–4
37	L	January 7, 1978	1–3	Boston Bruins(1977–78)	9–24–4
38	L	January 8, 1978	1–3	St. Louis Blues(1977–78)	9–25–4
39	L	January 11, 1978	3–4	Toronto Maple Leafs(1977–78)	9–26–4
40	T	January 13, 1978	2–2	Washington Capitals(1977–78)	9–26–5
41	L	January 14, 1978	2–5	@ St. Louis Blues(1977–78)	9–27–5
42	L	January 18, 1978	2–5	New York Islanders(1977–78)	9–28–5
43	L	January 21, 1978	1–4	Chicago Black Hawks(1977–78)	9–29–5
44	L	January 22, 1978	3–4	Atlanta Flames(1977–78)	9–30–5
45	W	January 26, 1978	2–1	@ Buffalo Sabres(1977–78)	10–30–5
46	L	January 28, 1978	1–2	Cleveland Barons(1977–78)	10–31–5
47	W	January 29, 1978	4–0	@ Washington Capitals(1977–78)	11–31–5
48	L	January 31, 1978	4–7	@ Atlanta Flames(1977–78)	11–32–5

February

Game	Result	Date	Score	Opponent	Record
49	L	February 1, 1978	1–6	@ Pittsburgh Penguins(1977–78)	11–33–5
50	L	February 4, 1978	2–4	Buffalo Sabres(1977–78)	11–34–5
51	L	February 8, 1978	0–3	@ New York Rangers(1977–78)	11–35–5
52	W	February 11, 1978	3–2	Vancouver Canucks(1977–78)	12–35–5
53	T	February 12, 1978	3–3	Colorado Rockies(1977–78)	12–35–6
54	W	February 16, 1978	4–2	@ Philadelphia Flyers(1977–78)	13–35–6
55	L	February 18, 1978	4–5	@ Toronto Maple Leafs(1977–78)	13–36–6
56	L	February 19, 1978	1–2	@ Washington Capitals(1977–78)	13–37–6
57	W	February 22, 1978	4–1	Los Angeles Kings(1977–78)	14–37–6
58	L	February 24, 1978	2–3	@ Colorado Rockies(1977–78)	14–38–6
59	L	February 25, 1978	1–5	@ Vancouver Canucks(1977–78)	14–39–6
60	L	February 28, 1978	1–7	@ St. Louis Blues(1977–78)	14–40–6

March

Game	Result	Date	Score	Opponent	Record
61	L	March 1, 1978	2–3	St. Louis Blues(1977–78)	14–41–6
62	L	March 4, 1978	1–3	Detroit Red Wings(1977–78)	14–42–6
63	L	March 5, 1978	3–4	@ Detroit Red Wings(1977–78)	14–43–6
64	L	March 8, 1978	3–4	Chicago Black Hawks(1977–78)	14–44–6
65	T	March 11, 1978	1–1	@ St. Louis Blues(1977–78)	14–44–7
66	L	March 13, 1978	2–5	Montreal Canadiens(1977–78)	14–45–7
67	L	March 16, 1978	2–7	@ Boston Bruins(1977–78)	14–46–7
68	T	March 17, 1978	4–4	@ Cleveland Barons(1977–78)	14–46–8
69	T	March 19, 1978	7–7	New York Rangers(1977–78)	14–46–9
70	W	March 21, 1978	7–1	Pittsburgh Penguins(1977–78)	15–46–9
71	L	March 23, 1978	1–3	Los Angeles Kings(1977–78)	15–47–9
72	L	March 25, 1978	3–4	Philadelphia Flyers(1977–78)	15–48–9
73	L	March 26, 1978	3–6	@ New York Islanders(1977–78)	15–49–9
74	W	March 28, 1978	9–4	Vancouver Canucks(1977–78)	16–49–9
75	L	March 29, 1978	3–7	@ Cleveland Barons(1977–78)	16–50–9

April

Game	Result	Date	Score	Opponent	Record
76	L	April 1, 1978	2–4	@ Colorado Rockies(1977–78)	16–51–9
77	W	April 4, 1978	5–3	Colorado Rockies(1977–78)	17–51–9
78	L	April 5, 1978	2–7	@ Pittsburgh Penguins(1977–78)	17–52–9
79	L	April 8, 1978	2–4	@ Chicago Black Hawks(1977–78)	17–53–9
80	W	April 9, 1978	3–1	@ Philadelphia Flyers(1977–78)	18–53–9

Legend: Win (2 points) Loss (0 points) Tie (1 point)

== Player statistics ==
=== Skaters ===
Note: GP = Games played; G = Goals; A = Assists; Pts = Points; +/- = Plus/minus; PIM = Penalty minutes

Player	GP	G	A	Pts	+/-	PIM
Roland Eriksson	78	21	39	60	−29	12

=== Goaltenders ===
Note: GP = Games played; TOI = Time on ice (minutes); W = Wins; L = Losses; OT = Overtime losses; GA = Goals against; SO = Shutouts; SV% = Save percentage; GAA = Goals against average

Player	GP	TOI	W	L	OT	GA	SO	SV%	GAA
