= 1977–78 Vancouver Canucks season =

8th season in franchise history

1977–78 Vancouver Canucks
- Division: 3rd Smythe
- Conference: 7th Campbell
- 1977–78 record: 20–43–17
- Home record: 13–15–12
- Road record: 7–28–5
- Goals for: 239
- Goals against: 320

Team information
- General manager: Jake Milford
- Coach: Orland Kurtenbach
- Captain: Don Lever
- Alternate captains: Chris Oddleifson; Dennis Kearns; John Grisdale
- Arena: Pacific Coliseum
- Average attendance: 15,123

Team leaders
- Goals: Mike Walton (29)
- Assists: Dennis Kearns (43)
- Points: Mike Walton (66)
- Penalty minutes: Jack McIlhargey (172)
- Wins: Cesare Maniago (10)
- Goals against average: Cesare Maniago (4.02)

The 1977–78 Vancouver Canucks season was the team's eighth in the National Hockey League (NHL).

== Regular season ==
=== Final standings ===
Smythe Division
	GP	W	L	T	GF	GA	Pts
**Chicago Black Hawks**	80	32	29	19	230	220	83
**Colorado Rockies**	80	19	40	21	257	305	59
Vancouver Canucks	80	20	43	17	239	320	57
St. Louis Blues	80	20	47	13	195	304	53
Minnesota North Stars	80	18	53	9	218	325	45

Note: GP = Games played, W = Wins, L = Losses, T = Ties, Pts = Points, GF = Goals for, GA = Goals against
Note: Teams that qualified for the playoffs are highlighted in bold.

=== Record vs. opponents ===
Smythe Division record vs. opponents

**Vs. Campbell Conference**

**Vs. Wales Conference**

**Vs. Smythe Division**

1977–78 NHL records
Team	**CHI**	**COL**	**MIN**	**STL**	**VAN**	**Total**
Chicago	—	1–1–4	5–0–1	3–1–2	2–3–1	**11–5–8**
Colorado	1–1–4	—	3–1–2	1–4–1	3–0–3	**8–6–10**
Minnesota	0–5–1	1–3–2	—	1–4–1	3–3	**5–15–4**
St. Louis	1–3–2	4–1–1	4–1–1	—	3–3	**12–8–4**
Vancouver	3–2–1	0–3–3	3–3	3–3	—	**9–11–4**

**Vs. Patrick Division**

1977–78 NHL records
Team	**ATL**	**NYI**	**NYR**	**PHI**	**Total**
Chicago	2–1–2	1–2–2	1–3–1	2–2–1	**6–8–6**
Colorado	1–2–2	0–4–1	2–2–1	2–3	**5–11–4**
Minnesota	1–4	1–4	0–3–2	2–3	**4–14–2**
St. Louis	0–4–1	0–4–1	0–4–1	1–4	**1–16–3**
Vancouver	1–2–2	0–5	1–4	0–5	**2–16–2**

**Vs. Adams Division**

1977–78 NHL records
Team	**BOS**	**BUF**	**CLE**	**TOR**	**Total**
Chicago	1–3	1–2–1	3–1	1–2–1	**6–8–2**
Colorado	0–3–1	1–3	1–1–2	0–4	**2–11–3**
Minnesota	1–3	1–3	0–3–1	0–4	**2–13–1**
St. Louis	0–4	0–4	2–1–1	0–2–2	**2–11–3**
Vancouver	0–2–2	0–1–3	1–2–1	0–3–1	**1–8–7**

**Vs. Norris Division**

1977–78 NHL records
Team	**DET**	**LAK**	**MTL**	**PIT**	**WSH**	**Total**
Chicago	3–1	2–2	0–3–1	1–2–1	3–0–1	**9–8–3**
Colorado	1–2–1	1–2–1	0–4	1–2–1	1–2–1	**4–12–4**
Minnesota	0–4	1–2–1	2–2	2–2	2–1–1	**7–11–2**
St. Louis	1–3	2–2	0–4	1–2–1	1–1–2	**5–12–3**
Vancouver	1–2–1	1–2–1	0–3–1	2–1–1	4–0	**8–8–4**

== Schedule and results ==
1977–78 regular season
October

Game	Result	Date	Score	Opponent	Record
1	L	October 12, 1977	3–6	@ New York Rangers (1977–78)	0–1–0
2	T	October 14, 1977	4–4	@ Colorado Rockies (1977–78)	0–1–1
3	W	October 15, 1977	5–3	@ Minnesota North Stars (1977–78)	1–1–1
4	W	October 18, 1977	3–2	Detroit Red Wings (1977–78)	2–1–1
5	T	October 23, 1977	3–3	Boston Bruins (1977–78)	2–1–2
6	W	October 25, 1977	3–1	Los Angeles Kings (1977–78)	3–1–2
7	L	October 27, 1977	2–3	New York Islanders (1977–78)	3–2–2
8	L	October 29, 1977	2–6	Colorado Rockies (1977–78)	3–3–2

November

Game	Result	Date	Score	Opponent	Record
9	L	November 2, 1977	1–5	Toronto Maple Leafs (1977–78)	3–4–2
10	L	November 4, 1977	1–5	New York Rangers (1977–78)	3–5–2
11	L	November 6, 1977	2–3	@ Philadelphia Flyers (1977–78)	3–6–2
12	L	November 8, 1977	2–6	@ Colorado Rockies (1977–78)	3–7–2
13	L	November 9, 1977	6–8	@ St. Louis Blues (1977–78)	3–8–2
14	W	November 11, 1977	4–2	Minnesota North Stars (1977–78)	4–8–2
15	W	November 15, 1977	5–4	Cleveland Barons (1977–78)	5–8–2
16	T	November 17, 1977	4–4	@ Boston Bruins (1977–78)	5–8–3
17	L	November 19, 1977	2–9	@ New York Islanders (1977–78)	5–9–3
18	W	November 20, 1977	3–0	@ New York Rangers (1977–78)	6–9–3
19	T	November 22, 1977	3–3	Pittsburgh Penguins (1977–78)	6–9–4
20	T	November 26, 1977	2–2	Chicago Black Hawks (1977–78)	6–9–5
21	L	November 29, 1977	0–3	Philadelphia Flyers (1977–78)	6–10–5

December

Game	Result	Date	Score	Opponent	Record
22	W	December 2, 1977	3–2	Atlanta Flames (1977–78)	7–10–5
23	W	December 4, 1977	6–2	@ Chicago Black Hawks (1977–78)	8–10–5
24	W	December 6, 1977	5–2	@ Washington Capitals (1977–78)	9–10–5
25	T	December 7, 1977	2–2	@ Atlanta Flames (1977–78)	9–10–6
26	L	December 10, 1977	2–7	@ Montreal Canadiens (1977–78)	9–11–6
27	L	December 11, 1977	0–3	@ Buffalo Sabres (1977–78)	9–12–6
28	W	December 13, 1977	3–1	Washington Capitals (1977–78)	10–12–6
29	T	December 17, 1977	5–5	Buffalo Sabres (1977–78)	10–12–7
30	L	December 19, 1977	2–3	@ Los Angeles Kings (1977–78)	10–13–7
31	T	December 20, 1977	2–2	Atlanta Flames (1977–78)	10–13–8
32	L	December 23, 1977	5–7	Minnesota North Stars (1977–78)	10–14–8
33	L	December 27, 1977	2–4	New York Islanders (1977–78)	10–15–8
34	T	December 30, 1977	2–2	Colorado Rockies (1977–78)	10–15–9

January

Game	Result	Date	Score	Opponent	Record
35	W	January 1, 1978	3–2	@ Chicago Black Hawks (1977–78)	11–15–9
36	L	January 3, 1978	1–4	@ New York Islanders (1977–78)	11–16–9
37	L	January 4, 1978	3–8	@ Pittsburgh Penguins (1977–78)	11–17–9
38	L	January 6, 1978	1–6	@ Cleveland Barons (1977–78)	11–18–9
39	L	January 7, 1978	4–6	@ Toronto Maple Leafs (1977–78)	11–19–9
40	W	January 11, 1978	6–4	St. Louis Blues (1977–78)	12–19–9
41	T	January 14, 1978	3–3	Colorado Rockies (1977–78)	12–19–10
42	L	January 17, 1978	4–5	New York Rangers (1977–78)	12–20–10
43	T	January 19, 1978	3–3	Toronto Maple Leafs (1977–78)	12–20–11
44	L	January 21, 1978	1–8	@ Montreal Canadiens (1977–78)	12–21–11
45	T	January 22, 1978	2–2	@ Buffalo Sabres (1977–78)	12–21–12
46	L	January 26, 1978	2–6	Philadelphia Flyers (1977–78)	12–22–12
47	W	January 28, 1978	8–3	St. Louis Blues (1977–78)	13–22–12
48	W	January 31, 1978	4–2	Washington Capitals (1977–78)	14–22–12

February

Game	Result	Date	Score	Opponent	Record
49	T	February 2, 1978	4–4	Montreal Canadiens (1977–78)	14–22–13
50	L	February 4, 1978	1–5	Chicago Black Hawks (1977–78)	14–23–13
51	L	February 7, 1978	2–4	Atlanta Flames (1977–78)	14–24–13
52	L	February 9, 1978	2–5	@ Philadelphia Flyers (1977–78)	14–25–13
53	L	February 11, 1978	2–3	@ Minnesota North Stars (1977–78)	14–26–13
54	L	February 12, 1978	3–8	@ Detroit Red Wings (1977–78)	14–27–13
55	W	February 14, 1978	4–2	@ Washington Capitals (1977–78)	15–27–13
56	L	February 15, 1978	3–6	@ New York Rangers (1977–78)	15–28–13
57	L	February 17, 1978	2–3	@ Cleveland Barons (1977–78)	15–29–13
58	L	February 18, 1978	3–4	@ St. Louis Blues (1977–78)	15–30–13
59	L	February 22, 1978	4–6	Boston Bruins (1977–78)	15–31–13
60	W	February 25, 1978	5–1	Minnesota North Stars (1977–78)	16–31–13
61	T	February 27, 1978	3–3	Cleveland Barons (1977–78)	16–31–14

March

Game	Result	Date	Score	Opponent	Record
62	W	March 1, 1978	3–2	Chicago Black Hawks (1977–78)	17–31–14
63	L	March 4, 1978	3–4	@ Toronto Maple Leafs (1977–78)	17–32–14
64	L	March 5, 1978	3–6	@ Boston Bruins (1977–78)	17–33–14
65	L	March 7, 1978	2–5	@ New York Islanders (1977–78)	17–34–14
66	L	March 8, 1978	3–8	@ Atlanta Flames (1977–78)	17–35–14
67	W	March 11, 1978	3–1	@ Pittsburgh Penguins (1977–78)	18–35–14
68	T	March 12, 1978	4–4	@ Detroit Red Wings (1977–78)	18–35–15
69	W	March 15, 1978	7–4	Pittsburgh Penguins (1977–78)	19–35–15
70	L	March 17, 1978	1–3	@ Colorado Rockies (1977–78)	19–36–15
71	L	March 18, 1978	4–5	Detroit Red Wings (1977–78)	19–37–15
72	L	March 20, 1978	1–5	Montreal Canadiens (1977–78)	19–38–15
73	T	March 24, 1978	2–2	Buffalo Sabres (1977–78)	19–38–16
74	L	March 26, 1978	3–4	@ Chicago Black Hawks (1977–78)	19–39–16
75	L	March 28, 1978	4–9	@ Minnesota North Stars (1977–78)	19–40–16
76	L	March 29, 1978	1–3	@ St. Louis Blues (1977–78)	19–41–16
77	L	March 31, 1978	2–3	Philadelphia Flyers (1977–78)	19–42–16

April

Game	Result	Date	Score	Opponent	Record
78	W	April 4, 1978	3–2	St. Louis Blues (1977–78)	20–42–16
79	T	April 7, 1978	5–5	Los Angeles Kings (1977–78)	20–42–17
80	L	April 8, 1978	3–5	@ Los Angeles Kings (1977–78)	20–43–17

Legend: Win (2 points) Loss (0 points) Tie (1 point)

== Draft picks ==
Vancouver's draft picks at the 1977 NHL amateur draft held at the Mount Royal Hotel in Montreal.

Round	#	Player	Nationality	College/Junior/Club team (League)
1	4	Jere Gillis	Canada	Sherbrooke Castors (QMJHL)
2	22	Jeff Bandura	Canada	Portland Winter Hawks (WCHL)
3	40	Glen Hanlon	Canada	Brandon Wheat Kings (WCHL)
4	56	Dave Morrow	Canada	Calgary Wranglers (WCHL)
4	58	Murray Bannerman	Canada	Victoria Cougars (WCHL)
5	76	Steve Hazlett	Canada	St. Catharines Fincups (OMJHL)
6	94	Brian Drumm	Canada	Peterborough Petes (OMJHL)
7	112	Ray Creasy	Canada	New Westminster Bruins (WCHL)

== Farm teams ==
- Tulsa Oilers

== See also ==
- 1977–78 NHL season
