= Randy Pierce (ice hockey) =

- Born: November 23, 1957 (age 68) Arnprior, Ontario, Canada
- Height: 5 ft 11 in (180 cm)
- Weight: 187 lb (85 kg; 13 st 5 lb)
- Position: Right wing
- Shot: Right
- Played for: Colorado Rockies; New Jersey Devils; Hartford Whalers
- NHL draft: 47th overall, 1977; Colorado Rockies
- WHA draft: 19th overall, 1977; New England Whalers
- Playing career: 1977–1986

Randy Stephen Pierce (born November 23, 1957) is a Canadian former professional ice hockey winger who played in the National Hockey League (NHL) from 1977 to 1985. Pierce was later named head coach of the Kanata Stallions of the Central Canada Hockey League on July 7, 2011. Pierce was born in Arnprior, Ontario.

== Career statistics ==
			Regular season					Playoffs
Season	Team	League	GP	G	A	Pts	PIM	GP	G	A	Pts	PIM
1975–76	Sudbury Wolves	OHL	56	21	44	65	72	15	9	16	25	13
1976–77	Sudbury Wolves	OMJHL	60	38	60	98	67	6	2	3	5	7
1977–78	Colorado Rockies	NHL	35	9	10	19	15	2	0	0	0	0
1977–78	Phoenix Roadrunners	CHL	12	3	1	4	11	—	—	—	—	—
1977–78	Hampton Gulls	AHL	3	0	1	1	2	—	—	—	—	—
1978–79	Colorado Rockies	NHL	70	19	17	36	35	—	—	—	—	—
1978–79	Philadelphia Firebirds	AHL	1	0	0	0	0	—	—	—	—	—
1979–80	Colorado Rockies	NHL	75	16	23	39	100	—	—	—	—	—
1980–81	Colorado Rockies	NHL	55	9	21	30	52	—	—	—	—	—
1981–82	Colorado Rockies	NHL	5	0	0	0	4	—	—	—	—	—
1981–82	Fort Worth Texans	CHL	15	6	6	12	19	—	—	—	—	—
1982–83	New Jersey Devils	NHL	3	0	0	0	0	—	—	—	—	—
1982–83	Wichita Wind	CHL	14	4	8	12	4	—	—	—	—	—
1982–83	Binghamton Whalers	AHL	46	14	41	55	33	2	0	1	1	0
1983–84	Hartford Whalers	NHL	17	6	3	9	9	—	—	—	—	—
1983–84	Binghamton Whalers	AHL	46	22	24	46	41	—	—	—	—	—
1984–85	Hartford Whalers	NHL	17	3	2	5	8	—	—	—	—	—
1984–85	Binghamton Whalers	AHL	31	6	10	16	45	6	2	1	3	6
1985–86	Salt Lake Golden Eagles	IHL	20	5	5	10	25	—	—	—	—	—
NHL totals			277	62	76	138	223	2	0	0	0	0
