= Nelson Burton (ice hockey) =

Canadian ice hockey player (born 1957)

- Born: November 6, 1957 (age 69) Sydney, Nova Scotia, Canada
- Height: 6 ft 1 in (185 cm)
- Weight: 215 lb (98 kg; 15 st 5 lb)
- Position: Left wing
- Shot: Left
- Played for: Washington Capitals
- NHL draft: 57th overall, 1977; Washington Capitals
- Playing career: 1977–1984

Nelson Keith Burton (born November 6, 1957) is a Canadian former professional ice hockey left wing. He played 8 games in the National Hockey League with the Washington Capitals during the 1977–78 and 1978–79 seasons. The rest of his career, which lasted from 1977 to 1984, was spent in the minor leagues. He was selected by Capitals in the fourth round (57th overall) of the 1977 NHL Amateur Draft.

== Early life ==
Burton was born in Sydney, Nova Scotia. He played junior hockey in the Quebec Major Junior Hockey League with the Hull Festivals and the Quebec Remparts.

== Career ==
Burton played eight games in the NHL, spending the balance of his career in the minor leagues. He scored one career NHL goal against future Hockey Hall of Famer Tony Esposito. He played mainly in the American Hockey League with the Hershey Bears, Nova Scotia Voyageurs, Syracuse Firebirds, and Baltimore Skipjacks. Burton was involved in youth hockey programs in Maryland for many years. He was also the coach for the Maryland Terrapins men's club hockey team. He now runs Nelson Hockey, a developmental youth hockey organization.

== Career statistics ==
=== Regular season and playoffs ===
			Regular season					Playoffs
Season	Team	League	GP	G	A	Pts	PIM	GP	G	A	Pts	PIM
1974–75	Hull Festivals	QMJHL	66	20	19	39	353	4	1	1	2	0
1975–76	Hull Festivals	QMJHL	39	13	9	22	122	—	—	—	—	—
1975–76	Quebec Remparts	QMJHL	32	13	16	29	198	13	0	3	3	90
1975–76	Quebec Remparts	M-Cup	—	—	—	—	—	3	0	0	0	13
1976–77	Quebec Remparts	QMJHL	67	22	28	50	393	9	1	5	6	70
1977–78	Washington Capitals	NHL	5	1	0	1	8	—	—	—	—	—
1977–78	Hershey Bears	AHL	57	4	7	11	323	—	—	—	—	—
1978–79	Washington Capitals	NHL	3	0	0	0	13	—	—	—	—	—
1978–79	Hershey Bears	AHL	51	6	19	25	204	—	—	—	—	—
1979–80	Syracuse Firebirds	AHL	2	0	1	1	0	—	—	—	—	—
1979–80	Nova Scotia Voyageurs	AHL	70	3	10	13	190	3	0	0	0	37
1980–81	Erie Blades	EHL	68	20	24	44	385	8	0	0	0	60
1981–82	Nashville South Stars	CHL	49	1	4	5	128	3	0	0	0	0
1982–83	Baltimore Skipjacks	AHL	60	3	8	11	71	—	—	—	—	—
1983–84	Erie Golden Blades	ACHL	65	10	12	22	156	9	0	1	1	79
AHL totals			240	16	45	61	788	3	0	0	0	37
NHL totals			8	1	0	1	21	—	—	—	—	—
