= 1977–78 Chicago Black Hawks season =

National Hockey League team season

1977–78 Chicago Black Hawks
- Smythe Division champions
- Division: 1st Smythe
- Conference: 4th Campbell
- 1977–78 record: 32–29–19
- Home record: 20–9–11
- Road record: 12–20–8
- Goals for: 230
- Goals against: 220

Team information
- General manager: Bob Pulford
- Coach: Bob Pulford
- Captain: Keith Magnuson
- Alternate captains: None
- Arena: Chicago Stadium

Team leaders
- Goals: Ivan Boldirev (35)
- Assists: Ivan Boldirev (45)
- Points: Ivan Boldirev (80)
- Penalty minutes: Keith Magnuson (145)
- Plus/minus: John Marks (+27)
- Wins: Tony Esposito (28)
- Goals against average: Tony Esposito (2.63)

The 1977–78 Chicago Black Hawks season was the Hawks' 52nd season in the NHL, and the club was coming off a 26–43–11 record, earning 63 points, which was their lowest total since the 1957–58 season. The Hawks managed to qualify for the playoffs, as they finished in third place in the Smythe Division. In the playoffs, the Black Hawks were quickly swept out in two games by the Boston Bruins in the NHL preliminary round.

== Offseason ==
During the off-season, Hawks general manager Tommy Ivan announced his retirement, and the club decided to not bring interim head coach Bill White back, so the club hired former Los Angeles Kings head coach Bob Pulford to take over both the head coach and general manager position. Pulford had been the head coach of the Kings from 1972 to 1977, winning the 1975 Jack Adams Trophy. The team also named Keith Magnuson as the only team captain, as in the 1976–77 season, the Hawks used Magnuson, Stan Mikita and Pit Martin as tri-captains.

== Regular season ==
The Black Hawks started off the season in a slump, as the team had a 6–10–8 record in their first 24 games. Chicago eventually snapped out of their funk, and found themselves a season high five games over .500 with a 24–18–16 record late in February. The Hawks, who were comfortably in first place in the Smythe Division, finished the season with a 32–29–19 record, earning 83 points, which was their highest total since 1973–74, and their sixth division title in the past nine seasons.

Offensively, the Black Hawks were led by Ivan Boldirev, who scored a team high 35 goals and 45 assists for 80 points. Thirty-seven-year-old Stan Mikita earned 59 points in 76 games to finish second in team scoring, while 22-year-old Ted Bulley had a very solid rookie season, scoring 23 goals and 51 points in 79 games. Another rookie, Doug Wilson, led the defense, scoring 14 goals and 34 points, while Bob Murray also scored 14 goals, along with 17 assists from the blueline. Keith Magnuson had a team high 145 penalty minutes, while John Marks led Chicago with a +27 rating.

In goal, Tony Esposito once again had the majority of playing time, winning 28 games, along with 5 shutouts and a 2.63 GAA.

=== Final standings ===
Smythe Division
	GP	W	L	T	GF	GA	Pts
**Chicago Black Hawks**	80	32	29	19	230	220	83
**Colorado Rockies**	80	19	40	21	257	305	59
Vancouver Canucks	80	20	43	17	239	320	57
St. Louis Blues	80	20	47	13	195	304	53
Minnesota North Stars	80	18	53	9	218	325	45

Note: GP = Games played, W = Wins, L = Losses, T = Ties, Pts = Points, GF = Goals for, GA = Goals against
Note: Teams that qualified for the playoffs are highlighted in bold.

=== Record vs. opponents ===
Smythe Division record vs. opponents

**Vs. Campbell Conference**

**Vs. Wales Conference**

**Vs. Smythe Division**

1977–78 NHL records
Team	**CHI**	**COL**	**MIN**	**STL**	**VAN**	**Total**
Chicago	—	1–1–4	5–0–1	3–1–2	2–3–1	**11–5–8**
Colorado	1–1–4	—	3–1–2	1–4–1	3–0–3	**8–6–10**
Minnesota	0–5–1	1–3–2	—	1–4–1	3–3	**5–15–4**
St. Louis	1–3–2	4–1–1	4–1–1	—	3–3	**12–8–4**
Vancouver	3–2–1	0–3–3	3–3	3–3	—	**9–11–4**

**Vs. Patrick Division**

1977–78 NHL records
Team	**ATL**	**NYI**	**NYR**	**PHI**	**Total**
Chicago	2–1–2	1–2–2	1–3–1	2–2–1	**6–8–6**
Colorado	1–2–2	0–4–1	2–2–1	2–3	**5–11–4**
Minnesota	1–4	1–4	0–3–2	2–3	**4–14–2**
St. Louis	0–4–1	0–4–1	0–4–1	1–4	**1–16–3**
Vancouver	1–2–2	0–5	1–4	0–5	**2–16–2**

**Vs. Adams Division**

1977–78 NHL records
Team	**BOS**	**BUF**	**CLE**	**TOR**	**Total**
Chicago	1–3	1–2–1	3–1	1–2–1	**6–8–2**
Colorado	0–3–1	1–3	1–1–2	0–4	**2–11–3**
Minnesota	1–3	1–3	0–3–1	0–4	**2–13–1**
St. Louis	0–4	0–4	2–1–1	0–2–2	**2–11–3**
Vancouver	0–2–2	0–1–3	1–2–1	0–3–1	**1–8–7**

**Vs. Norris Division**

1977–78 NHL records
Team	**DET**	**LAK**	**MTL**	**PIT**	**WSH**	**Total**
Chicago	3–1	2–2	0–3–1	1–2–1	3–0–1	**9–8–3**
Colorado	1–2–1	1–2–1	0–4	1–2–1	1–2–1	**4–12–4**
Minnesota	0–4	1–2–1	2–2	2–2	2–1–1	**7–11–2**
St. Louis	1–3	2–2	0–4	1–2–1	1–1–2	**5–12–3**
Vancouver	1–2–1	1–2–1	0–3–1	2–1–1	4–0	**8–8–4**

== Schedule and results ==
1977–78 regular season
October

Game	Date	Visitor	Score	Home	Record	Points
1	October 13	Chicago Black Hawks	1–5	Philadelphia Flyers	0–1–0	0
2	October 15	Colorado Rockies	3–3	Chicago Black Hawks	0–1–1	1
3	October 16	Chicago Black Hawks	2–0	Buffalo Sabres	1–1–1	3
4	October 19	Buffalo Sabres	2–2	Chicago Black Hawks	1–1–2	4
5	October 22	Chicago Black Hawks	0–3	Colorado Rockies	1–2–2	4
6	October 23	St. Louis Blues	0–2	Chicago Black Hawks	2–2–2	6
7	October 26	Philadelphia Flyers	2–2	Chicago Black Hawks	2–2–3	7
8	October 28	Chicago Black Hawks	4–2	Cleveland Barons	3–2–3	9
9	October 30	Cleveland Barons	1–6	Chicago Black Hawks	4–2–3	11

November

Game	Date	Visitor	Score	Home	Record	Points
10	November 2	Chicago Black Hawks	2–2	Washington Capitals	4–2–4	12
11	November 5	Chicago Black Hawks	5–2	Minnesota North Stars	5–2–4	14
12	November 6	Atlanta Flames	3–3	Chicago Black Hawks	5–2–5	15
13	November 9	Minnesota North Stars	2–2	Chicago Black Hawks	5–2–6	16
14	November 12	Chicago Black Hawks	4–7	Pittsburgh Penguins	5–3–6	16
15	November 13	Montreal Canadiens	3–2	Chicago Black Hawks	5–4–6	16
16	November 15	Chicago Black Hawks	1–1	New York Islanders	5–4–7	17
17	November 16	Chicago Black Hawks	2–5	New York Rangers	5–5–7	17
18	November 20	Chicago Black Hawks	0–1	Boston Bruins	5–6–7	17
19	November 23	Chicago Black Hawks	3–8	Los Angeles Kings	5–7–7	17
20	November 25	Chicago Black Hawks	5–1	Colorado Rockies	6–7–7	19
21	November 26	Chicago Black Hawks	2–2	Vancouver Canucks	6–7–8	20
22	November 30	Buffalo Sabres	3–2	Chicago Black Hawks	6–8–8	20

December

Game	Date	Visitor	Score	Home	Record	Points
23	December 3	Chicago Black Hawks	2–3	Montreal Canadiens	6–9–8	20
24	December 4	Vancouver Canucks	6–2	Chicago Black Hawks	6–10–8	20
25	December 6	Chicago Black Hawks	2–1	Detroit Red Wings	7–10–8	22
26	December 7	New York Islanders	4–0	Chicago Black Hawks	7–11–8	22
27	December 10	Chicago Black Hawks	2–4	Philadelphia Flyers	7–12–8	22
28	December 11	Minnesota North Stars	3–8	Chicago Black Hawks	8–12–8	24
29	December 13	Chicago Black Hawks	2–2	New York Islanders	8–12–9	25
30	December 14	New York Rangers	2–2	Chicago Black Hawks	8–12–10	26
31	December 17	Chicago Black Hawks	1–7	Toronto Maple Leafs	8–13–10	26
32	December 18	Atlanta Flames	0–3	Chicago Black Hawks	9–13–10	28
33	December 21	Chicago Black Hawks	6–2	St. Louis Blues	10–13–10	30
34	December 22	Los Angeles Kings	4–0	Chicago Black Hawks	10–14–10	30
35	December 27	Chicago Black Hawks	4–2	Atlanta Flames	11–14–10	32
36	December 28	Toronto Maple Leafs	0–4	Chicago Black Hawks	12–14–10	34

January

Game	Date	Visitor	Score	Home	Record	Points
37	January 1	Vancouver Canucks	3–2	Chicago Black Hawks	12–15–10	34
38	January 4	Boston Bruins	3–0	Chicago Black Hawks	12–16–10	34
39	January 7	Chicago Black Hawks	0–0	St. Louis Blues	12–16–11	35
40	January 8	Washington Capitals	1–3	Chicago Black Hawks	13–16–11	37
41	January 11	Philadelphia Flyers	4–5	Chicago Black Hawks	14–16–11	39
42	January 14	Chicago Black Hawks	3–3	Toronto Maple Leafs	14–16–12	40
43	January 18	Washington Capitals	2–5	Chicago Black Hawks	15–16–12	42
44	January 19	Chicago Black Hawks	2–4	Detroit Red Wings	15–17–12	42
45	January 21	Chicago Black Hawks	4–1	Minnesota North Stars	16–17–12	44
46	January 22	St. Louis Blues	1–3	Chicago Black Hawks	17–17–12	46
47	January 26	Cleveland Barons	0–5	Chicago Black Hawks	18–17–12	48
48	January 28	Detroit Red Wings	1–6	Chicago Black Hawks	19–17–12	50

February

Game	Date	Visitor	Score	Home	Record	Points
49	February 1	Philadelphia Flyers	1–3	Chicago Black Hawks	20–17–12	52
50	February 4	Chicago Black Hawks	5–1	Vancouver Canucks	21–17–12	54
51	February 8	New York Islanders	4–5	Chicago Black Hawks	22–17–12	56
52	February 9	Chicago Black Hawks	3–3	Montreal Canadiens	22–17–13	57
53	February 12	Atlanta Flames	2–2	Chicago Black Hawks	22–17–14	58
54	February 14	Chicago Black Hawks	1–2	Pittsburgh Penguins	22–18–14	58
55	February 15	Colorado Rockies	2–2	Chicago Black Hawks	22–18–15	59
56	February 18	Boston Bruins	2–4	Chicago Black Hawks	23–18–15	61
57	February 19	Pittsburgh Penguins	2–2	Chicago Black Hawks	23–18–16	62
58	February 22	New York Rangers	2–3	Chicago Black Hawks	24–18–16	64
59	February 23	Chicago Black Hawks	2–6	New York Rangers	24–19–16	64
60	February 25	Chicago Black Hawks	1–7	New York Islanders	24–20–16	64
61	February 26	Toronto Maple Leafs	5–3	Chicago Black Hawks	24–21–16	64

March

Game	Date	Visitor	Score	Home	Record	Points
62	March 1	Chicago Black Hawks	2–3	Vancouver Canucks	24–22–16	64
63	March 4	Chicago Black Hawks	6–3	Los Angeles Kings	25–22–16	66
64	March 5	Chicago Black Hawks	2–2	Colorado Rockies	25–22–17	67
65	March 8	Chicago Black Hawks	4–3	Minnesota North Stars	26–22–17	69
66	March 11	Chicago Black Hawks	1–4	Atlanta Flames	26–23–17	69
67	March 12	Chicago Black Hawks	2–5	Buffalo Sabres	26–24–17	69
68	March 15	Montreal Canadiens	6–2	Chicago Black Hawks	26–25–17	69
69	March 18	Chicago Black Hawks	4–5	St. Louis Blues	26–26–17	69
70	March 19	Pittsburgh Penguins	1–9	Chicago Black Hawks	27–26–17	71
71	March 22	Chicago Black Hawks	6–2	Washington Capitals	28–26–17	73
72	March 23	Chicago Black Hawks	0–7	Boston Bruins	28–27–17	73
73	March 25	St. Louis Blues	2–2	Chicago Black Hawks	28–27–18	74
74	March 26	Vancouver Canucks	3–4	Chicago Black Hawks	29–27–18	76
75	March 29	Los Angeles Kings	1–5	Chicago Black Hawks	30–27–18	78

April

Game	Date	Visitor	Score	Home	Record	Points
76	April 1	Detroit Red Wings	0–2	Chicago Black Hawks	31–27–18	80
77	April 2	Chicago Black Hawks	2–4	Cleveland Barons	31–28–18	80
78	April 5	Colorado Rockies	4–4	Chicago Black Hawks	31–28–19	81
79	April 8	Minnesota North Stars	2–4	Chicago Black Hawks	32–28–19	83
80	April 9	Chicago Black Hawks	2–3	New York Rangers	32–29–19	83

Legend: Win (2 points) Loss (0 points) Tie (1 point)

== Playoffs ==
Since the Hawks won their division, they were given a bye in the NHL preliminary round, and advanced straight to the NHL quarter-finals. Their first round opponent was the Boston Bruins, who finished in first place in the Adams Division with 113 points. The series opened at the Boston Garden, and the Bruins struck first, easily winning the first game by a 6–1 score. Chicago forced the second game into overtime, however, the Bruins would be victorious once again, this time winning 4–3 to take a 2–0 series lead. The series moved to Chicago Stadium for the next two games, but it was Boston who stayed hot, as they defeated the Hawks 4–3 in overtime once again in the third game. The Bruins dominated the fourth game, winning 5–2, to sweep the series. This was the third straight season that the Black Hawks were swept out of their first playoff round, as the team saw their playoff losing streak reach twelve games.

1978 Stanley Cup playoffs
Quarterfinals vs. (2) Boston Bruins – Bruins win 4–0

Game	Date	Visitor	Score	Home	Series
1	April 17	Chicago Black Hawks	1–6	Boston Bruins	0–1
2	April 19	Chicago Black Hawks	3–4	Boston Bruins	0–2
3	April 21	Boston Bruins	4–3	Chicago Black Hawks	0–3
4	April 23	Boston Bruins	5–2	Chicago Black Hawks	0–4

Legend: Win Loss

== Player stats ==
=== Regular season ===
Scoring

Player	Pos	GP	G	A	Pts	PIM	+/-	PPG	SHG	GWG
Ivan Boldirev	C	80	35	45	80	34	−3	10	0	2
Stan Mikita	C/RW	76	18	41	59	35	18	6	0	2
Ted Bulley	LW	79	23	28	51	141	4	6	0	5
J.P. Bordeleau	RW	76	15	25	40	32	9	0	2	3
Grant Mulvey	RW	78	14	24	38	135	−1	3	0	0
Darcy Rota	LW	78	17	20	37	67	5	3	0	1
John Marks	LW	80	15	22	37	26	27	0	0	1
Doug Wilson	D	77	14	20	34	72	11	5	0	2
Cliff Koroll	RW	73	16	15	31	19	8	1	0	4
Bob Murray	D	70	14	17	31	41	11	2	0	3
Pierre Plante	RW	77	10	18	28	59	−2	0	0	2
Phil Russell	D	57	6	20	26	139	19	0	1	1
Dale Tallon	D	75	4	20	24	66	3	2	1	2
Bob Kelly	LW	75	7	11	18	95	−26	0	0	2
Jean Savard	C	31	7	11	18	20	6	2	0	2
Alain Daigle	RW	53	6	6	12	13	−12	1	0	0
Jim Harrison	C	26	2	8	10	31	−3	1	0	0
Doug Hicks	D	13	1	7	8	2	5	0	0	0
Keith Magnuson	D	67	2	4	6	145	0	0	0	0
Dave Logan	D	54	1	5	6	77	−14	1	0	0
Kirk Bowman	LW	33	1	4	5	13	0	0	0	0
Tony Esposito	G	64	0	4	4	0	0	0	0	0
Pit Martin	C	7	1	1	2	0	−1	0	0	0
Mike O'Connell	D	6	1	1	2	2	0	0	0	0
Reg Kerr	LW	2	0	2	2	0	2	0	0	0
Bob Hoffmeyer	D	5	0	1	1	12	−2	0	0	0
Randy Holt	D	6	0	0	0	20	−4	0	0	0
Eddie Johnston	G	4	0	0	0	0	0	0	0	0
Mike Veisor	G	12	0	0	0	0	0	0	0	0

Goaltending

Player	MIN	GP	W	L	T	GA	GAA	SO
Tony Esposito	3840	64	28	22	14	168	2.63	5
Mike Veisor	720	12	3	4	5	31	2.58	2
Eddie Johnston	240	4	1	3	0	17	4.25	0
Team:	4800	80	32	29	19	216	2.70	7

=== Playoffs ===
Scoring

Player	Pos	GP	G	A	Pts	PIM	PPG	SHG	GWG
Bob Murray	D	4	1	4	5	2	0	0	0
Grant Mulvey	RW	4	2	2	4	0	1	0	0
Stan Mikita	C/RW	4	3	0	3	0	2	0	0
Ted Bulley	LW	4	1	1	2	2	0	0	0
Ivan Boldirev	C	4	0	2	2	2	0	0	0
Dale Tallon	D	4	0	2	2	0	0	0	0
Doug Hicks	D	4	1	0	1	2	1	0	0
Cliff Koroll	RW	4	1	0	1	0	0	0	0
J.P. Bordeleau	RW	4	0	1	1	0	0	0	0
Alain Daigle	RW	4	0	1	1	0	0	0	0
John Marks	LW	4	0	1	1	0	0	0	0
Kirk Bowman	LW	3	0	0	0	0	0	0	0
Tony Esposito	G	4	0	0	0	0	0	0	0
Bob Kelly	LW	4	0	0	0	8	0	0	0
Dave Logan	D	4	0	0	0	8	0	0	0
Keith Magnuson	D	4	0	0	0	7	0	0	0
Pierre Plante	RW	1	0	0	0	0	0	0	0
Darcy Rota	LW	4	0	0	0	2	0	0	0
Doug Wilson	D	4	0	0	0	0	0	0	0

Goaltending

Player	MIN	GP	W	L	GA	GAA	SO
Tony Esposito	252	4	0	4	19	4.52	0
Team:	252	4	0	4	19	4.52	0

Note: Pos = Position; GP = Games played; G = Goals; A = Assists; Pts = Points; +/- = plus/minus; PIM = Penalty minutes; PPG = Power-play goals; SHG = Short-handed goals; GWG = Game-winning goals
MIN = Minutes played; W = Wins; L = Losses; T = Ties; GA = Goals-against; GAA = Goals-against average; SO = Shutouts;

== Playoff stats ==
=== Scoring leaders ===
Player	GP	G	A	Pts	PIM
Bob Murray	4	1	4	5	2
Grant Mulvey	4	2	2	4	0
Stan Mikita	4	3	0	3	0
Ted Bulley	4	1	1	2	2
Dale Tallon	4	0	2	2	0

=== Goaltending ===
Player	GP	TOI	W	L	GA	SO	GAA
Tony Esposito	4	252	0	4	19	0	4.52

== Draft picks ==
Chicago's draft picks at the 1977 NHL amateur draft at the Mount Royal Hotel in Montreal.

Round	#	Player	Nationality	College/Junior/Club team (League)
1	6	Doug Wilson	Canada	Ottawa 67's (OMJHL)
2	19	Jean Savard	Canada	Quebec Remparts (QMJHL)
4	60	Randy Ireland	Canada	Portland Winter Hawks (WCHL)
5	78	Gary Platt	Canada	Sorel Black Hawks (QMJHL)
6	96	Jack O'Callahan	United States	Boston University (NCAA)
7	114	Floyd Lahache	Canada	Sherbrooke Castors (QMJHL)
8	129	Jeff Geiger	Canada	Ottawa 67's (OMJHL)
9	144	Steve Ough	Canada	Laval National (QMJHL)

== Sources ==
- Hockey-Reference
- Rauzulu's Street
- Goalies Archive
- HockeyDB
- National Hockey League Guide & Record Book 2007
