= 1977–78 Toronto Maple Leafs season =

NHL hockey team season

1977–78 Toronto Maple Leafs
- Division: 3rd Adams
- Conference: 4th Wales
- 1977–78 record: 41–29–10
- Home record: 21–13–6
- Road record: 20–16–4
- Goals for: 271
- Goals against: 237

Team information
- General manager: Jim Gregory
- Coach: Roger Neilson
- Captain: Darryl Sittler
- Alternate captains: None
- Arena: Maple Leaf Gardens

Team leaders
- Goals: Lanny McDonald (47)
- Assists: Darryl Sittler (72)
- Points: Darryl Sittler (117)
- Penalty minutes: Tiger Williams (351)
- Wins: Mike Palmateer (34)
- Goals against average: Mike Palmateer (2.75)

The 1977–78 Toronto Maple Leafs season was the 61st season of the franchise, 51st as the Maple Leafs. The Leafs made the playoffs for the fifth consecutive year, and won two series before losing the semi-finals to the eventual Stanley Cup champion Montreal Canadiens.

== Offseason ==
=== NHL draft ===
Round	#	Player	Nationality	College/junior/club team
1	11	John Anderson (LW)	Canada	Toronto Marlboros (OHA)
1	12	Trevor Johansen (D)	Canada	Toronto Marlboros (OHA)
2	24	Bob Gladney (D)	Canada	Oshawa Generals (OHA)
2	29	Rocky Saganiuk (RW)	Canada	Lethbridge Broncos (WCHL)
4	65	Dan Eastman (RW)	Canada	London Knights (OMJHL)
5	83	John Wilson (LW)	Canada	Windsor Spitfires (OMJHL)
6	101	Roy Sommer (LW)	United States	Calgary Wranglers (WCHL)
7	119	Lynn Jorgenson (LW)	Canada	Toronto Marlboros (OMJHL)
8	134	Kevin Howe (D)	Canada	Sault Ste. Marie Greyhounds (OMJHL)
9	149	Ray Robertson (D)	Canada	St. Lawrence University (ECAC)

== Regular season ==
Darryl Sittler ranked third in the NHL in scoring with 117 points.

=== Final standings ===
Adams Division
	GP	W	L	T	GF	GA	Pts
Boston Bruins	80	51	18	11	333	218	113
Buffalo Sabres	80	44	19	17	288	215	105
Toronto Maple Leafs	80	41	29	10	271	237	92
Cleveland Barons	80	22	45	13	230	325	57

=== Record vs. opponents ===
Adams Division record vs. opponents

Vs. Wales Conference

Vs. Campbell Conference

Vs. Adams Division

1977–78 NHL records
Team	BOS	BUF	CLE	TOR	Total
Boston	—	2–4	3–1–2	5–0–1	10–5–3
Buffalo	4–2	—	4–2	2–3–1	10–7–1
Cleveland	1–3–2	2–4	—	2–4	5–13–2
Toronto	0–5–1	3–2–1	4–2	—	7–9–2

Vs. Norris Division

1977–78 NHL records
Team	DET	LAK	MTL	PIT	WSH	Total
Boston	4–0–1	5–0	0–4–1	5–0	4–0–1	18–4–3
Buffalo	2–2–1	3–0–2	3–2	0–0–5	3–1–1	11–5–9
Cleveland	2–2–1	1–3–1	1–4	0–5	2–3	6–17–2
Toronto	2–1–2	2–3	0–4–1	2–3	4–0–1	10–11–4

Vs. Patrick Division

1977–78 NHL records
Team	ATL	NYI	NYR	PHI	Total
Boston	2–1–1	1–3	4–1	1–2–1	8–7–2
Buffalo	2–1–1	3–2	2–1–1	3–0–1	10–4–3
Cleveland	1–2–1	1–1–2	1–3	0–4–1	3–10–4
Toronto	2–3	1–3	3–1	3–1	9–8–0

Vs. Smythe Division

1977–78 NHL records
Team	CHI	COL	MIN	STL	VAN	Total
Boston	3–1	3–0–1	3–1	4–0	2–0–2	15–2–3
Buffalo	2–1–1	3–1	3–1	4–0	1–0–3	13–3–4
Cleveland	1–3	1–1–2	3–0–1	1–2–1	2–1–1	8–7–5
Toronto	2–1–1	4–0	4–0	2–0–2	3–0–1	15–1–4

== Schedule and results ==
1977–78 regular season
October

Game	Result	Date	Score	Opponent	Record
1	T	October 13, 1977	3–3	@ Detroit Red Wings (1977–78)	0–0–1
2	L	October 15, 1977	2–5	Buffalo Sabres (1977–78)	0–1–1
3	W	October 19, 1977	5–4	Colorado Rockies (1977–78)	1–1–1
4	W	October 22, 1977	6–1	Philadelphia Flyers (1977–78)	2–1–1
5	W	October 23, 1977	6–3	@ Philadelphia Flyers (1977–78)	3–1–1
6	T	October 26, 1977	2–2	Montreal Canadiens (1977–78)	3–1–2
7	W	October 29, 1977	7–4	Detroit Red Wings (1977–78)	4–1–2

November

Game	Result	Date	Score	Opponent	Record
8	W	November 2, 1977	5–1	@ Vancouver Canucks (1977–78)	5–1–2
9	L	November 3, 1977	2–4	@ Los Angeles Kings (1977–78)	5–2–2
10	W	November 5, 1977	5–2	@ Colorado Rockies (1977–78)	6–2–2
11	W	November 9, 1977	4–0	@ Atlanta Flames (1977–78)	7–2–2
12	W	November 11, 1977	3–1	@ Washington Capitals (1977–78)	8–2–2
13	L	November 12, 1977	0–5	@ Montreal Canadiens (1977–78)	8–3–2
14	W	November 16, 1977	5–2	Washington Capitals (1977–78)	9–3–2
15	W	November 17, 1977	2–1	@ Buffalo Sabres (1977–78)	10–3–2
16	L	November 19, 1977	1–3	Boston Bruins (1977–78)	10–4–2
17	W	November 23, 1977	3–2	@ St. Louis Blues (1977–78)	11–4–2
18	T	November 26, 1977	4–4	Washington Capitals (1977–78)	11–4–3
19	W	November 29, 1977	3–2	Cleveland Barons (1977–78)	12–4–3
20	L	November 30, 1977	3–5	@ Cleveland Barons (1977–78)	12–5–3

December

Game	Result	Date	Score	Opponent	Record
21	W	December 3, 1977	4–2	Detroit Red Wings (1977–78)	13–5–3
22	L	December 4, 1977	1–3	@ Boston Bruins (1977–78)	13–6–3
23	W	December 7, 1977	6–3	Minnesota North Stars (1977–78)	14–6–3
24	W	December 9, 1977	3–2	@ Colorado Rockies (1977–78)	15–6–3
25	W	December 10, 1977	3–0	@ Los Angeles Kings (1977–78)	16–6–3
26	W	December 14, 1977	3–2	New York Islanders (1977–78)	17–6–3
27	W	December 16, 1977	8–5	@ Minnesota North Stars (1977–78)	18–6–3
28	W	December 17, 1977	7–1	Chicago Black Hawks (1977–78)	19–6–3
29	T	December 19, 1977	4–4	St. Louis Blues (1977–78)	19–6–4
30	L	December 21, 1977	2–3	Montreal Canadiens (1977–78)	19–7–4
31	W	December 23, 1977	6–2	@ Pittsburgh Penguins (1977–78)	20–7–4
32	L	December 26, 1977	4–5	Pittsburgh Penguins (1977–78)	20–8–4
33	L	December 28, 1977	0–4	@ Chicago Black Hawks (1977–78)	20–9–4
34	W	December 30, 1977	5–0	@ Cleveland Barons (1977–78)	21–9–4
35	L	December 31, 1977	0–3	Atlanta Flames (1977–78)	21–10–4

January

Game	Result	Date	Score	Opponent	Record
36	W	January 4, 1978	5–0	Colorado Rockies (1977–78)	22–10–4
37	L	January 5, 1978	1–2	@ Detroit Red Wings (1977–78)	22–11–4
38	W	January 7, 1978	6–4	Vancouver Canucks (1977–78)	23–11–4
39	L	January 9, 1978	2–5	Atlanta Flames (1977–78)	23–12–4
40	W	January 11, 1978	4–3	@ Minnesota North Stars (1977–78)	24–12–4
41	L	January 13, 1978	2–5	@ Cleveland Barons (1977–78)	24–13–4
42	T	January 14, 1978	3–3	Chicago Black Hawks (1977–78)	24–13–5
43	T	January 17, 1978	2–2	@ St. Louis Blues (1977–78)	24–13–6
44	T	January 19, 1978	3–3	@ Vancouver Canucks (1977–78)	24–13–7
45	L	January 21, 1978	1–2	@ Los Angeles Kings (1977–78)	24–14–7
46	W	January 25, 1978	4–3	@ New York Rangers (1977–78)	25–14–7
47	L	January 26, 1978	2–4	@ New York Islanders (1977–78)	25–15–7
48	W	January 28, 1978	7–5	@ Atlanta Flames (1977–78)	26–15–7

February

Game	Result	Date	Score	Opponent	Record
49	T	February 1, 1978	2–2	Buffalo Sabres (1977–78)	26–15–8
50	T	February 4, 1978	2–2	Detroit Red Wings (1977–78)	26–15–9
51	T	February 5, 1978	3–3	@ Boston Bruins (1977–78)	26–15–10
52	W	February 8, 1978	5–4	St. Louis Blues (1977–78)	27–15–10
53	W	February 11, 1978	3–2	New York Rangers (1977–78)	28–15–10
54	W	February 13, 1978	4–2	@ Buffalo Sabres (1977–78)	29–15–10
55	L	February 15, 1978	2–4	Boston Bruins (1977–78)	29–16–10
56	W	February 18, 1978	5–4	Minnesota North Stars (1977–78)	30–16–10
57	W	February 22, 1978	5–3	Cleveland Barons (1977–78)	31–16–10
58	W	February 25, 1978	4–0	Washington Capitals (1977–78)	32–16–10
59	W	February 26, 1978	5–3	@ Chicago Black Hawks (1977–78)	33–16–10
60	L	February 28, 1978	3–4	@ New York Islanders (1977–78)	33–17–10

March

Game	Result	Date	Score	Opponent	Record
61	W	March 1, 1978	3–2	Philadelphia Flyers (1977–78)	34–17–10
62	W	March 4, 1978	4–3	Vancouver Canucks (1977–78)	35–17–10
63	W	March 5, 1978	4–1	@ New York Rangers (1977–78)	36–17–10
64	L	March 8, 1978	1–5	Los Angeles Kings (1977–78)	36–18–10
65	L	March 9, 1978	1–4	@ Montreal Canadiens (1977–78)	36–19–10
66	W	March 11, 1978	5–2	Cleveland Barons (1977–78)	37–19–10
67	W	March 12, 1978	7–1	@ Pittsburgh Penguins (1977–78)	38–19–10
68	W	March 15, 1978	5–2	@ Washington Capitals (1977–78)	39–19–10
69	L	March 18, 1978	2–3	Pittsburgh Penguins (1977–78)	39–20–10
70	L	March 19, 1978	4–6	@ Boston Bruins (1977–78)	39–21–10
71	L	March 22, 1978	2–6	New York Islanders (1977–78)	39–22–10
72	L	March 23, 1978	1–4	@ Philadelphia Flyers (1977–78)	39–23–10
73	L	March 25, 1978	2–5	New York Rangers (1977–78)	39–24–10
74	W	March 27, 1978	3–0	Los Angeles Kings (1977–78)	40–24–10
75	L	March 29, 1978	4–7	@ Atlanta Flames (1977–78)	40–25–10

April

Game	Result	Date	Score	Opponent	Record
76	W	April 1, 1978	3–2	Buffalo Sabres (1977–78)	41–25–10
77	L	April 2, 1978	3–6	@ Pittsburgh Penguins (1977–78)	41–26–10
78	L	April 5, 1978	3–6	Montreal Canadiens (1977–78)	41–27–10
79	L	April 8, 1978	1–3	Boston Bruins (1977–78)	41–28–10
80	L	April 9, 1978	1–2	@ Buffalo Sabres (1977–78)	41–29–10

Legend: Win (2 points) Loss (0 points) Tie (1 point)

== Playoffs ==
- Won preliminary round (2–0) versus Los Angeles Kings
- Won quarter-finals (4–3) versus New York Islanders
- Lost semi-finals (4–0) versus Montreal Canadiens

== Player statistics ==
=== Regular season ===
Scoring

Player	Pos	GP	G	A	Pts	PIM	+/-	PPG	SHG	GWG
Darryl Sittler	C	80	45	72	117	100	34	14	0	8
Lanny McDonald	RW	74	47	40	87	54	34	11	0	5
Borje Salming	D	80	16	60	76	70	30	6	0	5
Ian Turnbull	D	77	14	47	61	77	6	3	1	3
Ron Ellis	RW	80	26	24	50	17	8	3	0	5
Tiger Williams	LW	78	19	31	50	351	6	6	0	5
Errol Thompson	LW	59	17	22	39	10	17	4	1	2
Pat Boutette	C/RW	80	17	19	36	120	0	2	0	1
Bruce Boudreau	C	40	11	18	29	12	8	1	0	2
George Ferguson	C	73	7	16	23	37	−9	0	0	0
Jack Valiquette	C	60	8	13	21	15	2	3	0	2
Stan Weir	C	30	12	5	17	4	0	0	0	0
Brian Glennie	D	77	2	15	17	62	24	0	0	0
Jerry Butler	RW	73	9	7	16	49	−10	1	1	1
Trevor Johansen	D	79	2	14	16	82	3	0	0	0
Jimmy Jones	RW	78	4	9	13	23	1	0	2	1
Randy Carlyle	D	49	2	11	13	31	4	0	0	0
Mike Pelyk	D	41	1	11	12	14	1	1	0	0
Dan Maloney	LW	13	3	4	7	25	−5	0	0	1
Jim McKenny	D	15	2	2	4	8	4	0	0	0
Kurt Walker	D	40	2	2	4	69	−5	0	0	0
Ron Wilson	D	13	2	1	3	0	−5	1	0	0
John Anderson	RW	17	1	2	3	2	1	0	0	0
Don Ashby	C	12	1	2	3	0	−4	0	0	0
Inge Hammarstrom	LW	3	1	1	2	0	1	1	0	0
Alain Belanger	RW	9	0	1	1	6	0	0	0	0
Bob Neely	LW	11	0	1	1	0	−3	0	0	0
Mike Palmateer	G	63	0	1	1	12	0	0	0	0
Paul Evans	C/LW	4	0	0	0	2	−1	0	0	0
Larry Hopkins	LW	2	0	0	0	0	0	0	0	0
Gord McRae	G	18	0	0	0	2	0	0	0	0

Goaltending

Player	MIN	GP	W	L	T	GA	GAA	SO
Mike Palmateer	3760	63	34	19	9	172	2.74	5
Gord McRae	1040	18	7	10	1	57	3.29	1
Team:	4800	80	41	29	10	229	2.86	6

=== Playoffs ===
Scoring

Player	Pos	GP	G	A	Pts	PIM	PPG	SHG	GWG
Ian Turnbull	D	13	6	10	16	10	1	0	0
Darryl Sittler	C	13	3	8	11	12	2	0	0
Lanny McDonald	RW	13	3	4	7	10	1	0	2
George Ferguson	C	13	5	1	6	7	0	0	0
Pat Boutette	C/RW	13	3	3	6	40	0	0	0
Jimmy Jones	RW	13	1	5	6	7	0	0	0
Ron Ellis	RW	13	3	2	5	0	0	0	2
Stan Weir	C	13	3	1	4	0	1	0	1
Borje Salming	D	6	2	2	4	6	0	0	1
Dan Maloney	LW	13	1	3	4	17	1	0	0
Jack Valiquette	C	13	1	3	4	2	1	0	0
Tiger Williams	LW	12	1	2	3	63	0	0	0
Trevor Johansen	D	13	0	3	3	21	0	0	0
Jerry Butler	RW	13	1	1	2	18	0	0	0
Randy Carlyle	D	7	0	1	1	8	0	0	0
Mike Pelyk	D	12	0	1	1	7	0	0	0
John Anderson	RW	2	0	0	0	0	0	0	0
Brian Glennie	D	13	0	0	0	16	0	0	0
Mike Palmateer	G	13	0	0	0	7	0	0	0
Kurt Walker	D	10	0	0	0	10	0	0	0

Goaltending

Player	MIN	GP	W	L	GA	GAA	SO
Mike Palmateer	795	13	6	7	32	2.42	2
Team:	795	13	6	7	32	2.42	2

Note:

Pos = Position;GP = Games played; G = Goals; A = Assists; Pts = Points; PIM = Penalty minutes; +/- = Plus/minus; PPG = Power-play goals; SHG = Short-handed goals; GWG = Game-winning goals
Pos = Position;GP = Games played; Min, TOI = Minutes played; W = Wins; L = Losses; T,T/OT = Ties; OTL = Overtime losses; GA = Goals-against; GAA = Goals-against average; SO = Shutouts; SA = Shots against; SV = Shots saved;SV% = Save percentage;

== Awards and records ==
- Börje Salming, Molson Cup (most game star selections for Toronto Maple Leafs)
- Borje Salming, NHL 2nd All-Star Team
- Darryl Sittler, NHL 2nd All-Star Team

== Transactions ==
The Maple Leafs have been involved in the following transactions during the 1977–78 season.

=== Trades ===
November 1, 1977	To St. Louis Blues Inge Hammarstrom	To Toronto Maple Leafs Jerry Butler
January 9, 1978	To Colorado Rockies Bob Neely	To Toronto Maple Leafs Cash
January 29, 1978	To Vancouver Canucks Claire Alexander	To Toronto Maple Leafs Cash
March 13, 1978	To Detroit Red Wings Errol Thompson; 1st round pick in 1978 – Brent Peterson; 2nd round pick in 1978 – Al Jensen; 1st round pick in 1980 – Mike Blaisdell	To Toronto Maple Leafs Dan Maloney; 2nd round pick in 1980 – Craig Muni
May 30, 1978	To Colorado Rockies Cash	To Toronto Maple Leafs Bob Neely
June 13, 1978	To Pittsburgh Penguins Randy Carlyle; George Ferguson	To Toronto Maple Leafs Dave Burrows; 6th round pick in 1978 – Mel Hewitt
June 14, 1978	To Los Angeles Kings Brian Glennie; Kurt Walker; Scott Garland; 2nd round pick in 1979 – Mark Hardy	To Toronto Maple Leafs Dave Hutchison; Lorne Stamler
June 14, 1978	To Minnesota North Stars 4th round pick in 1981 – Terry Tait	To Toronto Maple Leafs Paul Harrison
June 15, 1978	To St. Louis Blues 11th round pick in 1978 – Jean-François Boutin; 12th round pick in 1978 – Paul Stasiuk; 13th round pick in 1978 – Brian Crombeen; 14th round pick in 1978 – Blair Wheeler	To Toronto Maple Leafs Cash

=== Waivers ===
October 10, 1977	To New York Rangers Wayne Thomas

=== Free agents ===
Player	Former team
Jimmy Jones	Rochester Americans (AHL)
Larry Hopkins	Undrafted Free Agent
