= 1977–78 Philadelphia Flyers season =

NHL hockey team season

1977–78 Philadelphia Flyers
- Division: 2nd Patrick
- Conference: 2nd Campbell
- 1977–78 record: 45–20–15
- Home record: 29–6–5
- Road record: 16–14–10
- Goals for: 296 (4th)
- Goals against: 200 (2nd)

Team information
- General manager: Keith Allen
- Coach: Fred Shero
- Captain: Bobby Clarke
- Alternate captains: None (Note: The alternate captain position was abolished from the 1975–76 season through the 1984–85 season.)
- Arena: Spectrum
- Average attendance: 17,077
- Minor league affiliates: Maine Mariners; Philadelphia Firebirds

Team leaders
- Goals: Bill Barber (41)
- Assists: Bobby Clarke (68)
- Points: Bobby Clarke (89)
- Penalty minutes: André Dupont (225)
- Plus/minus: Bobby Clarke (+47)
- Wins: Bernie Parent (29)
- Goals against average: Bernie Parent (2.22)

The 1977–78 Philadelphia Flyers season was the franchise's 11th season in the National Hockey League (NHL).

== Regular season ==
The Flyers lost their hold on the Patrick Division in 1977–78 and settled for second place.

Tom Bladon's eight points (four goals and four assists) in a game against the Cleveland Barons on December 11, 1977, set an NHL record for a defenseman.

=== Season standings ===
Patrick Division
	GP	W	L	T	GF	GA	Pts
**New York Islanders**	80	48	17	15	334	210	111
**Philadelphia Flyers**	80	45	20	15	296	200	105
**Atlanta Flames**	80	34	27	19	274	252	87
**New York Rangers**	80	30	37	13	279	280	73

Note: GP = Games played, W = Wins, L = Losses, T = Ties, Pts = Points, GF = Goals for, GA = Goals against
Note: Teams that qualified for the playoffs are highlighted in bold.

=== Record vs. opponents ===
Patrick Division record vs. opponents

**Vs. Campbell Conference**

**Vs. Wales Conference**

**Vs. Patrick Division**

1977–78 NHL records
Team	**ATL**	**NYI**	**NYR**	**PHI**	**Total**
Atlanta	—	1–2–3	6–0	1–4–1	**8–6–4**
N.Y. Islanders	2–1–3	—	4–2	2–1–3	**8–4–6**
N.Y. Rangers	0–6	2–4	—	0–4–2	**2–14–2**
Philadelphia	4–1–1	1–2–3	4–0–2	—	**9–3–6**

**Vs. Smythe Division**

1977–78 NHL records
Team	**CHI**	**COL**	**MIN**	**STL**	**VAN**	**Total**
Atlanta	1–2–2	2–1–2	4–1	4–0–1	2–1–2	**13–5–7**
N.Y. Islanders	2–1–2	4–0–1	4–1	4–0–1	5–0	**19–2–4**
N.Y. Rangers	3–1–1	2–2–1	3–0–2	4–0–1	4–1	**16–4–5**
Philadelphia	2–2–1	3–2	3–2	4–1	5–0	**17–7–1**

**Vs. Adams Division**

1977–78 NHL records
Team	**BOS**	**BUF**	**CLE**	**TOR**	**Total**
Atlanta	1–2–1	1–2–1	2–1–1	3–2	**7–7–3**
N.Y. Islanders	3–1	2–3	1–1–2	3–1	**9–6–2**
N.Y. Rangers	1–4	1–2–1	3–1	1–3	**6–10–1**
Philadelphia	2–1–1	0–3–1	4–0–1	1–3	**7–7–3**

**Vs. Norris Division**

1977–78 NHL records
Team	**DET**	**LAK**	**MTL**	**PIT**	**WSH**	**Total**
Atlanta	1–2–1	1–2–1	0–2–2	3–1	1–2–1	**6–9–5**
N.Y. Islanders	4–0	2–0–2	0–4	2–1–1	4–0	**12–5–3**
N.Y. Rangers	2–1–1	1–3	1–3	0–2–2	2–0–2	**6–9–5**
Philadelphia	2–1–1	3–0–1	0–2–2	3–0–1	4–0	**12–3–5**

== Playoffs ==
After sweeping the Colorado Rockies in 2 games in the preliminary round, the Flyers moved on and beat Buffalo in five games. They faced Boston in the semifinals for the second consecutive season, and lost again, this time in five games.

== Schedule and results ==
=== Regular season ===
1977–78 regular season
October: 5–2–1, 11 points (home: 3–1–0; road: 2–1–1)

Game	Date	Score	Opponent	Decision	Record	Points	Recap
1	October 13	5–1	Chicago Black Hawks	Stephenson	1–0–0	2	W
2	October 15	8–2	@ Pittsburgh Penguins	Parent	2–0–0	4	W
3	October 16	7–0	St. Louis Blues	Stephenson	3–0–0	6	W
4	October 20	11–0	Pittsburgh Penguins	Parent	4–0–0	8	W
5	October 22	1–6	@ Toronto Maple Leafs	Stephenson	4–1–0	8	L
6	October 23	3–6	Toronto Maple Leafs	Parent	4–2–0	8	L
7	October 26	2–2	@ Chicago Black Hawks	Parent	4–2–1	9	T
8	October 29	7–3	@ St. Louis Blues	Parent	5–2–1	11	W

November: 9–2–2, 20 points (home: 6–1–1; road: 3–1–1)

Game	Date	Score	Opponent	Decision	Record	Points	Recap
9	November 3	4–1	Washington Capitals	Parent	6–2–1	13	W
10	November 5	3–1	@ Washington Capitals	Stephenson	7–2–1	15	W
11	November 6	3–2	Vancouver Canucks	Parent	8–2–1	17	W
12	November 10	2–3	Buffalo Sabres	Stephenson	8–3–1	17	L
13	November 12	2–2	@ New York Islanders	Parent	8–3–2	18	T
14	November 13	3–0	Detroit Red Wings	Stephenson	9–3–2	20	W
15	November 17	4–4	New York Islanders	Parent	9–3–3	21	T
16	November 19	7–2	@ Minnesota North Stars	Stephenson	10–3–3	23	W
17	November 20	4–0	Atlanta Flames	Parent	11–3–3	25	W
18	November 23	1–4	@ Detroit Red Wings	Stephenson	11–4–3	25	L
19	November 25	7–2	Cleveland Barons	Parent	12–4–3	27	W
20	November 27	2–0	Los Angeles Kings	Stephenson	13–4–3	29	W
21	November 29	3–0	@ Vancouver Canucks	Parent	14–4–3	31	W

December: 10–3–1, 21 points (home: 5–1–0; road: 5–2–1)

Game	Date	Score	Opponent	Decision	Record	Points	Recap
22	December 1	4–2	@ Los Angeles Kings	Stephenson	15–4–3	33	W
23	December 3	6–3	@ Colorado Rockies	Parent	16–4–3	35	W
24	December 7	3–3	@ New York Rangers	Stephenson	16–4–4	36	T
25	December 8	7–4	New York Rangers	Parent	17–4–4	38	W
26	December 10	4–2	Chicago Black Hawks	Stephenson	18–4–4	40	W
27	December 11	11–1	Cleveland Barons	Parent	19–4–4	42	W
28	December 15	6–4	Boston Bruins	Stephenson	20–4–4	44	W
29	December 17	4–3	@ Atlanta Flames	Parent	21–4–4	46	W
30	December 18	0–2	Montreal Canadiens	Stephenson	21–5–4	46	L
31	December 21	4–0	@ Cleveland Barons	Parent	22–5–4	48	W
32	December 23	1–6	@ Boston Bruins	Stephenson	22–6–4	48	L
33	December 28	4–3	@ New York Rangers	Parent	23–6–4	50	W
34	December 29	5–2	Minnesota North Stars	Stephenson	24–6–4	52	W
35	December 31	2–3	@ St. Louis Blues	Parent	24–7–4	52	L

January: 4–4–5, 13 points (home: 3–0–3; road: 1–4–2)

Game	Date	Score	Opponent	Decision	Record	Points	Recap
36	January 3	5–4	Cleveland Barons	Stephenson	25–7–4	54	W
37	January 5	4–4	Los Angeles Kings	Parent	25–7–5	55	T
38	January 6	3–5	@ Atlanta Flames	Stephenson	25–8–5	55	L
39	January 9	3–3	@ Montreal Canadiens	Parent	25–8–6	56	T
40	January 11	4–5	@ Chicago Black Hawks	Stephenson	25–9–6	56	L
41	January 12	4–4	Pittsburgh Penguins	Parent	25–9–7	57	T
42	January 14	4–1	New York Rangers	Parent	26–9–7	59	W
43	January 16	5–3	Atlanta Flames	Parent	27–9–7	61	W
44	January 19	1–1	Montreal Canadiens	Parent	27–9–8	62	T
45	January 21	1–6	@ New York Islanders	Parent	27–10–8	62	L
46	January 26	6–2	@ Vancouver Canucks	Parent	28–10–8	64	W
47	January 28	4–6	@ Colorado Rockies	Stephenson	28–11–8	64	L
48	January 29	3–3	@ Detroit Red Wings	Parent	28–11–9	65	T

February: 7–4–2, 16 points (home: 5–2–0; road: 2–2–2)

Game	Date	Score	Opponent	Decision	Record	Points	Recap
49	February 1	1–3	@ Chicago Black Hawks	Parent	28–12–9	65	L
50	February 2	3–0	Colorado Rockies	Parent	29–12–9	67	W
51	February 4	2–2	@ Cleveland Barons	Parent	29–12–10	68	T
52	February 6	2–0	St. Louis Blues	Parent	30–12–10	70	W
53	February 9	5–2	Vancouver Canucks	Parent	31–12–10	72	W
54	February 12	4–1	Washington Capitals	Parent	32–12–10	74	W
55	February 16	2–4	Minnesota North Stars	St. Croix	32–13–10	74	L
56	February 18	4–2	Detroit Red Wings	Parent	33–13–10	76	W
57	February 19	1–4	New York Islanders	Parent	33–14–10	76	L
58	February 23	0–4	@ Buffalo Sabres	St. Croix	33–15–10	76	L
59	February 25	3–1	@ Pittsburgh Penguins	St. Croix	34–15–10	78	W
60	February 26	6–1	@ Washington Capitals	St. Croix	35–15–10	80	W
61	February 28	4–4	@ Boston Bruins	St. Croix	35–15–11	81	T

March: 8–4–2, 18 points (home: 6–0–1; road: 2–4–1)

Game	Date	Score	Opponent	Decision	Record	Points	Recap
62	March 1	2–3	@ Toronto Maple Leafs	St. Croix	35–16–11	81	L
63	March 4	1–7	@ Montreal Canadiens	St. Croix	35–17–11	81	L
64	March 5	7–1	St. Louis Blues	Parent	36–17–11	83	W
65	March 7	5–3	Atlanta Flames	Stephenson	37–17–11	85	W
66	March 11	6–2	Boston Bruins	Parent	38–17–11	87	W
67	March 12	6–2	Colorado Rockies	Stephenson	39–17–11	89	W
68	March 15	2–2	@ New York Rangers	Parent	39–17–12	90	T
69	March 16	1–3	@ Buffalo Sabres	Stephenson	39–18–12	90	L
70	March 18	2–2	Buffalo Sabres	Parent	39–18–13	91	T
71	March 20	4–2	New York Islanders	Parent	40–18–13	93	W
72	March 23	4–1	Toronto Maple Leafs	Parent	41–18–13	95	W
73	March 25	4–3	@ Minnesota North Stars	Parent	42–18–13	97	W
74	March 28	3–4	@ Colorado Rockies	Parent	42–19–13	97	L
75	March 31	3–2	@ Vancouver Canucks	Stephenson	43–19–13	99	W

April: 2–1–2, 6 points (home: 1–1–0; road: 1–0–2)

Game	Date	Score	Opponent	Decision	Record	Points	Recap
76	April 1	4–2	@ Los Angeles Kings	Parent	44–19–13	101	W
77	April 4	3–3	@ New York Islanders	Parent	44–19–14	102	T
78	April 6	3–0	New York Rangers	Parent	45–19–14	104	W
79	April 8	1–1	@ Atlanta Flames	Parent	45–19–15	105	T
80	April 9	1–3	Minnesota North Stars	Stephenson	45–20–15	105	L

Legend: W Win (2 points) L Loss (0 points) T Tie (1 point)

=== Playoffs ===
1978 Stanley Cup playoffs
Preliminary Round vs. Colorado Rockies – Flyers win 2–0

Game	Date	Score	Opponent	Decision	Series	Recap
1	April 11	3–2 OT	Colorado Rockies	Parent	Flyers lead 1–0	W
2	April 13	3–1	@ Colorado Rockies	Parent	Flyers win 2–0	W

Quarterfinals vs. Buffalo Sabres – Flyers win 4–1

Game	Date	Score	Opponent	Decision	Series	Recap
1	April 17	2–4	Buffalo Sabres	Parent	Sabres lead 1–0	W
2	April 19	2–1 OT	Buffalo Sabres	Parent	Series tied 1–1	W
3	April 22	5–2	@ Buffalo Sabres	Parent	Flyers lead 2–1	L
4	April 23	4–2	@ Buffalo Sabres	Parent	Flyers lead 3–1	W
5	April 25	6–3	Buffalo Sabres	Parent	Flyers win 4–1	W

Semifinals vs. Boston Bruins – Bruins win 4–1

Game	Date	Score	Opponent	Decision	Series	Recap
1	May 2	2–3	@ Boston Bruins	Parent	Bruins lead 1–0	L
2	May 4	5–7	@ Boston Bruins	Parent	Bruins lead 2–0	L
3	May 7	3–1	Boston Bruins	Parent	Bruins lead 2–1	W
4	May 9	2–4	Boston Bruins	Parent	Bruins lead 3–1	L
5	May 11	3–6	@ Boston Bruins	Parent	Bruins win 4–1	L

Legend: W Win L Loss

== Player statistics ==
=== Scoring ===
- Position abbreviations: C = Center; D = Defense; G = Goaltender; LW = Left wing; RW = Right wing
- † = Joined team via a transaction (e.g., trade, waivers, signing) during the season. Stats reflect time with the Flyers only.
- ‡ = Left team via a transaction (e.g., trade, waivers, release) during the season. Stats reflect time with the Flyers only.

No.	Player	Pos	Regular season						Playoffs					
No.	Player	Pos	GP	G	A	Pts	+/-	PIM	GP	G	A	Pts	+/-	PIM
16	Bobby Clarke	C	71	21	68	89	47	83	12	4	7	11	−5	8
7	Bill Barber	LW	80	41	31	72	31	34	12	6	3	9	−2	2
19	Rick MacLeish	LW	76	31	39	70	24	33	12	7	9	16	1	4
26	Orest Kindrachuk	C	73	17	45	62	35	128	12	5	5	10	3	13
2	Bob Dailey	D	76	21	36	57	45	62	12	1	5	6	−2	22
27	Reggie Leach	RW	72	24	28	52	20	24	12	2	2	4	−3	0
18	Ross Lonsberry	LW	78	18	30	48	41	45	12	2	2	4	−3	6
10	Mel Bridgman	C	76	16	32	48	26	203	12	1	7	8	0	36
11	Don Saleski	RW	70	27	18	45	34	44	11	2	0	2	2	19
3	Tom Bladon	D	79	11	24	35	32	57	12	0	2	2	−4	11
17	Paul Holmgren	RW	62	16	18	34	23	190	12	1	4	5	−7	26
9	Bob Kelly	LW	74	19	13	32	15	95	12	3	5	8	8	26
29	Barry Dean	LW	56	7	18	25	12	34	—	—	—	—	—	—
5	Rick Lapointe	D	47	4	16	20	35	91	12	0	3	3	−3	19
20	Jimmy Watson	D	71	5	12	17	33	62	12	1	7	8	4	6
25	Kevin McCarthy	D	62	2	15	17	29	32	10	0	1	1	2	8
14	Joe Watson	D	65	5	9	14	23	22	1	0	0	0	−1	0
6	Andre Dupont	D	69	2	12	14	31	225	12	2	1	3	4	13
12	Gary Dornhoefer	RW	47	7	5	12	−3	62	4	0	0	0	0	7
8	Dave Hoyda	LW	41	1	3	4	−5	119	9	0	0	0	1	17
22	Harvey Bennett‡	C	2	1	0	1	1	7	—	—	—	—	—	—
32	Blake Dunlop†	C	3	0	1	1	1	0	—	—	—	—	—	—
21	Frank Bathe	D	1	0	0	0	0	0	—	—	—	—	—	—
28	Drew Callander	C	1	0	0	0	0	0	—	—	—	—	—	—
21	Jim Cunningham	LW	1	0	0	0	1	4	—	—	—	—	—	—
15	Al Hill	LW	3	0	0	0	0	2	—	—	—	—	—	—
1	Bernie Parent	G	49	0	0	0		4	12	0	0	0		0
30	Rick St. Croix	G	7	0	0	0		0	—	—	—	—	—	—
35	Wayne Stephenson	G	26	0	0	0		0	—	—	—	—	—	—

=== Goaltending ===
No.	Player	Regular season											Playoffs									
No.	Player	GP	GS	W	L	T	SA	GA	GAA	SV%	SO	TOI	GP	GS	W	L	SA	GA	GAA	SV%	SO	TOI
1	Bernie Parent	49	48	29	6	13	1223	108	2.22	.912	7	2,919	12	12	7	5	306	33	2.75	.892	0	719
35	Wayne Stephenson	26	25	14	10	1	648	68	2.76	.895	3	1,480	—	—	—	—	—	—	—	—	—	—
30	Rick St. Croix	7	7	2	4	1	165	20	3.05	.879	0	394	—	—	—	—	—	—	—	—	—	—

== Awards and records ==
=== Awards ===
Type	Award/honor	Recipient	Ref
League (in-season)	NHL All-Star Game selection	Bill Barber	
League (in-season)	NHL All-Star Game selection	Tom Bladon	
League (in-season)	NHL All-Star Game selection	Bobby Clarke	
League (in-season)	NHL All-Star Game selection	Bob Dailey	
League (in-season)	NHL All-Star Game selection	Fred Shero (Coach)	
League (in-season)	NHL All-Star Game selection	Wayne Stephenson	
League (in-season)	NHL All-Star Game selection	Jim Watson	
Team	Barry Ashbee Trophy	Jim Watson	
Team	Class Guy Award	Joe Watson	

=== Records ===
On December 11, 1977, defenseman Tom Bladon had a record-breaking game against the Cleveland Barons. He scored four goals, tying a team record, and picked up four assists for a total of eight points, a team record and tied for the NHL record among defenseman. His plus/minus of +10 in the game is an NHL single game record. Goaltender Bernie Parent won a team record ten consecutive games from November 20 to December 28. On April 1, Bill Barber tied a team record by scoring two shorthanded goals in a single game.

During the playoffs, Mel Bridgman scored the fastest playoff overtime goal in team history (23 seconds) to end game one of the team's preliminary round series against the Colorado Rockies. The three goals they allowed to Colorado in two games is the fewest goals the Flyers have allowed in any playoff series. On May 11, Orest Kindrachuk scored the two fastest goals by a single player in team playoff history, scoring eleven seconds apart.

=== Milestones ===
Milestone	Player	Date	Ref
First game	Kevin McCarthy	October 13, 1977	
First game	Dave Hoyda	October 15, 1977	
First game	Rick St. Croix	February 16, 1978	
First game	Jim Cunningham	February 28, 1978	
500th game played	Bernie Parent	December 8, 1977	

== Transactions ==
The Flyers were involved in the following transactions from May 15, 1977, the day after the deciding game of the 1977 Stanley Cup Final, through May 25, 1978, the day of the deciding game of the 1978 Stanley Cup Final.

=== Trades ===
Date	Details		Ref
June 14, 1977	To Philadelphia Flyers: 8th-round pick in 1977; 9th-round pick in 1977; 10th-round pick in 1977; 11th-round pick in 1977	To Buffalo Sabres: cash	
June 20, 1977	To Philadelphia Flyers: Future considerations (Note: The Kings sent Paul Evans to the Flyers on November 3, 1977, to complete trade.)	To Los Angeles Kings: Steve Short	
August 4, 1977	To Philadelphia Flyers: Barry Dean	To Colorado Rockies: Mark Suzor	
October 28, 1977	To Philadelphia Flyers: Blake Dunlop; 3rd-round pick in 1978	To Minnesota North Stars: Harvey Bennett	
November 1, 1977	To Philadelphia Flyers: Terry Murray	To Detroit Red Wings: cash	

=== Players acquired ===
Date	Player	Former team	Via	Ref
August 16, 1977	Guy Delparte	Oklahoma City Blazers (CHL)	Free agency	
August 17, 1977	Brian Burke	Providence College (HE)	Free agency	
September 1977	Jim Cunningham	Michigan State University (CCHA)	Free agency	
September 15, 1977	Larry Romanchych	Atlanta Flames	Free agency	
September 28, 1977	Bernie Johnston	Syracuse Blazers (NAHL)	Free agency	
October 7, 1977	Frank Bathe	Port Huron Flags (IHL)	Free agency	
October 23, 1977	Mike Busniuk	Nova Scotia Voyageurs (AHL)	Free agency	
November 6, 1977	Rudolf Tajcnar	HC Slovan Bratislava (TCH)	Free agency	

=== Players lost ===
Date	Player	New team	Via	Ref
June 17, 1977	Terry Crisp		Retirement (Note: Crisp was named an assistant coach.)	
September 14, 1977	Gary Inness	Indianapolis Racers (WHA)	Free agency	
April 1978	Gary Dornhoefer		Retirement (Note: Effective at the end of the season.)	

=== Signings ===
Date	Player	Term	Ref
June 30, 1977	Kevin McCarthy	3-year	
August 2, 1977	Tom Gorence		
August 2, 1977	Dave Hoyda		

== Draft picks ==
Philadelphia's picks at the 1977 NHL amateur draft, which was held at the NHL's office in Montreal, on June 14, 1977.

Round	Pick	Player	Position	Nationality	Team (league)	Notes
1	17	Kevin McCarthy	Defense	Canada	Winnipeg Monarchs (WCHL)	
2	35	Tom Gorence	Right wing	United States	University of Minnesota (CCHA)	
3	53	Dave Hoyda	Left wing	Canada	Portland Winter Hawks (WCHL)	
4	67	Yves Guillemette	Goaltender	Canada	Shawinigan Dynamos (QMJHL)	(Note: The Flyers traded Dave Schultz to the Los Angeles Kings for the Kings' fourth-round pick, 67th overall, and the Kings' 1978 second-round pick on September 29, 1976.)
4	71	Rene Hamelin	Right wing	Canada	Shawinigan Dynamos (QMJHL)	
5	89	Dan Clark	Defense	Canada	Kamloops Chiefs (WCHL)	
6	107	Alain Chaput	Center	Canada	Sorel Black Hawks (QMJHL)	
7	123	Richard Dalpe	Center	Canada	Trois-Rivières Draveurs (QMJHL)	
8	135	Pete Peeters	Goaltender	Canada	Medicine Hat Tigers (WCHL)	(Note: The Flyers traded Bobby Taylor and Ed Van Impe to the Pittsburgh Penguins for Gary Inness and future considerations (the Penguins' eighth through twelfth-round picks) on March 9, 1976.)
8	136	Clint Eccles	Center	Canada	Kamloops Chiefs (WCHL)	(Note: The Flyers traded cash to the Buffalo Sabres for the Sabres' eighth through eleventh-round picks on June 14, 1977.)
8	139	Mike Greeder	Defense	United States	St. Paul Vulcans (MJHL)	
9	150	Tom Bauer	Wing	United States	Providence College (HE)	
9	151	Michael Bauman	Defense	Canada	Hull Olympiques (QMJHL)	
9	153	Bruce Crowder	Forward	Canada	University of New Hampshire (HE)	
10	158	Rob Nicholson	Defense	United States	St. Paul Vulcans (MJHL)	
10	159	Dave Isherwood	Center	Canada	Winnipeg Monarchs (WCHL)	
10	161	Steve Jones	Goaltender	Canada	Ohio State University (CCHA)	
11	165	Jim Trainor	Defense	United States	Harvard University (ECAC)	
11	166	Barry Duench	Center	Canada	Kitchener Rangers (OHA)	
11	168	Rod McNair	Defense	Canada	Ohio State University (CCHA)	
12	172	Mike Laycock	Goaltender	Canada	Brown University (ECAC)	

== Farm teams ==
The Flyers were affiliated with the Maine Mariners of the AHL and the Philadelphia Firebirds of the NAHL.
