= 1977–78 Detroit Red Wings season =

National Hockey League team season

1977–78 Detroit Red Wings
- Division: 2nd Norris
- Conference: 5th Wales
- 1977–78 record: 32–34–14
- Home record: 22–11–7
- Road record: 10–23–7
- Goals for: 252
- Goals against: 266

Team information
- General manager: Ted Lindsay
- Coach: Bobby Kromm
- Captain: Dan Maloney; Dennis Hextall
- Alternate captains: None
- Arena: Detroit Olympia

Team leaders
- Goals: Dale McCourt (33)
- Assists: Reed Larson (41)
- Points: Dale McCourt (72)
- Penalty minutes: Dennis Polonich (254)
- Wins: Jim Rutherford (20)
- Goals against average: Ed Giacomin (3.14)

The 1977–78 Detroit Red Wings season was the Red Wings' 46th season, 52nd overall for the franchise. The Red Wings returned to the playoffs after an eight-year absence. In the postseason, the swept the Atlanta Flames 2–0 in the preliminary round, in the quarterfinal round the Wings would lose in five games to the eventual Stanley cup champion Montreal Canadiens. The Red Wings wouldn't return to the playoffs again until 1984, and wouldn't win another playoff series until 1987.

== Regular season ==
=== Final standings ===
Norris Division
	GP	W	L	T	GF	GA	Pts
**Montreal Canadiens**	80	59	10	11	359	183	129
**Detroit Red Wings**	80	32	34	14	252	266	78
**Los Angeles Kings**	80	31	34	15	243	245	77
Pittsburgh Penguins	80	25	37	18	254	321	68
Washington Capitals	80	17	49	14	195	321	48

Note: GP = Games played, W = Wins, L = Losses, T = Ties, Pts = Points, GF = Goals for, GA = Goals against
Note: Teams that qualified for the playoffs are highlighted in bold.

=== Record vs. opponents ===
Norris Division record vs. opponents

**Vs. Wales Conference**

**Vs. Campbell Conference**

**Vs. Norris Division**

1977–78 NHL records
Team	**DET**	**LAK**	**MTL**	**PIT**	**WSH**	**Total**
Detroit	—	3–2–1	1–4–1	3–2–1	4–1–1	**11–9–4**
Los Angeles	2–3–1	—	1–4–1	3–0–3	4–2	**10–9–5**
Montreal	4–1–1	4–1–1	—	5–1	5–0–1	**18–3–3**
Pittsburgh	2–3–1	0–3–3	1–5	—	1–4–1	**4–15–5**
Washington	1–4–1	2–4	0–5–1	4–1–1	—	**7–12–5**

**Vs. Adams Division**

1977–78 NHL records
Team	**BOS**	**BUF**	**CLE**	**TOR**	**Total**
Detroit	0–4–1	2–2–1	2–2–1	1–2–2	**5–10–5**
Los Angeles	0–5	0–3–2	3–1–1	3–2	**6–11–3**
Montreal	4–0–1	2–3	4–1	4–0–1	**14–4–2**
Pittsburgh	0–5	0–0–5	5–0	3–2	**8–7–5**
Washington	0–4–1	1–3–1	3–2	0–4–1	**4–13–3**

**Vs. Patrick Division**

1977–78 NHL records
Team	**ATL**	**NYI**	**NYR**	**PHI**	**Total**
Detroit	2–1–1	0–4	1–2–1	1–2–1	**4–9–3**
Los Angeles	2–1–1	0–2–2	3–1	0–3–1	**5–7–4**
Montreal	2–0–2	4–0	3–1	2–0–2	**11–1–4**
Pittsburgh	1–3	1–2–1	2–0–2	0–3–1	**4–8–4**
Washington	2–1–1	0–4	0–2–2	0–4	**2–11–3**

**Vs. Smythe Division**

1977–78 NHL records
Team	**CHI**	**COL**	**MIN**	**STL**	**VAN**	**Total**
Detroit	1–3	2–1–1	4–0	3–1	2–1–1	**12–6–2**
Los Angeles	2–2	2–1–1	2–1–1	2–2	2–1–1	**10–7–3**
Montreal	3–0–1	4–0	2–2	4–0	3–0–1	**16–2–2**
Pittsburgh	2–1–1	2–1–1	2–2	2–1–1	1–2–1	**9–7–4**
Washington	0–3–1	2–1–1	1–2–1	1–1–2	0–4	**4–11–5**

== Schedule and results ==
1977–78 regular season
October

Game	Result	Date	Score	Opponent	Record
1	T	October 13, 1977	3–3	Toronto Maple Leafs (1977–78)	0–0–1
2	L	October 15, 1977	2–4	@ Los Angeles Kings (1977–78)	0–1–1
3	L	October 18, 1977	2–3	@ Vancouver Canucks (1977–78)	0–2–1
4	T	October 20, 1977	2–2	Montreal Canadiens (1977–78)	0–2–2
5	W	October 22, 1977	4–2	@ Minnesota North Stars (1977–78)	1–2–2
6	W	October 26, 1977	4–3	@ Pittsburgh Penguins (1977–78)	2–2–2
7	W	October 27, 1977	3–1	Minnesota North Stars (1977–78)	3–2–2
8	L	October 29, 1977	4–7	@ Toronto Maple Leafs (1977–78)	3–3–2

November

Game	Result	Date	Score	Opponent	Record
9	W	November 2, 1977	3–1	Pittsburgh Penguins (1977–78)	4–3–2
10	L	November 5, 1977	3–4	Cleveland Barons (1977–78)	4–4–2
11	W	November 6, 1977	4–1	@ Cleveland Barons (1977–78)	5–4–2
12	T	November 9, 1977	1–1	Washington Capitals (1977–78)	5–4–3
13	W	November 12, 1977	3–1	New York Rangers (1977–78)	6–4–3
14	L	November 13, 1977	0–3	@ Philadelphia Flyers (1977–78)	6–5–3
15	W	November 16, 1977	10–1	St. Louis Blues (1977–78)	7–5–3
16	L	November 18, 1977	3–5	@ Atlanta Flames (1977–78)	7–6–3
17	W	November 19, 1977	2–1	@ St. Louis Blues (1977–78)	8–6–3
18	W	November 23, 1977	4–1	Philadelphia Flyers (1977–78)	9–6–3
19	L	November 26, 1977	1–3	@ Montreal Canadiens (1977–78)	9–7–3
20	L	November 27, 1977	1–4	New York Islanders (1977–78)	9–8–3
21	L	November 30, 1977	4–6	@ Pittsburgh Penguins (1977–78)	9–9–3

December

Game	Result	Date	Score	Opponent	Record
22	L	December 3, 1977	2–4	@ Toronto Maple Leafs (1977–78)	9–10–3
23	L	December 4, 1977	1–6	@ Buffalo Sabres (1977–78)	9–11–3
24	L	December 6, 1977	1–2	Chicago Black Hawks (1977–78)	9–12–3
25	L	December 8, 1977	4–6	@ Boston Bruins (1977–78)	9–13–3
26	L	December 10, 1977	4–7	@ New York Islanders (1977–78)	9–14–3
27	T	December 15, 1977	5–5	New York Rangers (1977–78)	9–14–4
28	W	December 17, 1977	3–2	@ St. Louis Blues (1977–78)	10–14–4
29	L	December 18, 1977	2–6	@ New York Rangers (1977–78)	10–15–4
30	L	December 21, 1977	3–5	Buffalo Sabres (1977–78)	10–16–4
31	L	December 23, 1977	2–3	@ Washington Capitals (1977–78)	10–17–4
32	W	December 27, 1977	5–2	Colorado Rockies (1977–78)	11–17–4
33	T	December 29, 1977	3–3	@ Buffalo Sabres (1977–78)	11–17–5
34	L	December 31, 1977	0–7	Boston Bruins (1977–78)	11–18–5

January

Game	Result	Date	Score	Opponent	Record
35	W	January 5, 1978	2–1	Toronto Maple Leafs (1977–78)	12–18–5
36	W	January 8, 1978	4–3	Los Angeles Kings (1977–78)	13–18–5
37	W	January 11, 1978	6–3	@ Washington Capitals (1977–78)	14–18–5
38	L	January 12, 1978	1–6	Montreal Canadiens (1977–78)	14–19–5
39	W	January 14, 1978	6–2	Buffalo Sabres (1977–78)	15–19–5
40	T	January 18, 1978	4–4	@ Colorado Rockies (1977–78)	15–19–6
41	W	January 19, 1978	4–2	Chicago Black Hawks (1977–78)	16–19–6
42	L	January 21, 1978	1–7	@ Boston Bruins (1977–78)	16–20–6
43	W	January 22, 1978	6–3	Washington Capitals (1977–78)	17–20–6
44	L	January 28, 1978	1–6	@ Chicago Black Hawks (1977–78)	17–21–6
45	T	January 29, 1978	3–3	Philadelphia Flyers (1977–78)	17–21–7
46	L	January 31, 1978	3–5	Pittsburgh Penguins (1977–78)	17–22–7

February

Game	Result	Date	Score	Opponent	Record
47	L	February 1, 1978	0–2	@ Cleveland Barons (1977–78)	17–23–7
48	T	February 4, 1978	2–2	@ Toronto Maple Leafs (1977–78)	17–23–8
49	W	February 5, 1978	4–3	Cleveland Barons (1977–78)	18–23–8
50	W	February 7, 1978	2–1	@ Los Angeles Kings (1977–78)	19–23–8
51	L	February 9, 1978	3–5	Boston Bruins (1977–78)	19–24–8
52	L	February 11, 1978	5–8	@ New York Islanders (1977–78)	19–25–8
53	W	February 12, 1978	8–3	Vancouver Canucks (1977–78)	20–25–8
54	W	February 16, 1978	5–3	Atlanta Flames (1977–78)	21–25–8
55	L	February 18, 1978	2–4	@ Philadelphia Flyers (1977–78)	21–26–8
56	W	February 19, 1978	5–1	Los Angeles Kings (1977–78)	22–26–8
57	W	February 23, 1978	4–1	Washington Capitals (1977–78)	23–26–8
58	T	February 25, 1978	2–2	@ Atlanta Flames (1977–78)	23–26–9
59	L	February 26, 1978	1–3	St. Louis Blues (1977–78)	23–27–9
60	L	February 28, 1978	3–9	@ Montreal Canadiens (1977–78)	23–28–9

March

Game	Result	Date	Score	Opponent	Record
61	L	March 1, 1978	2–3	@ New York Rangers (1977–78)	23–29–9
62	W	March 4, 1978	3–1	@ Minnesota North Stars (1977–78)	24–29–9
63	W	March 5, 1978	4–3	Minnesota North Stars (1977–78)	25–29–9
64	T	March 9, 1978	2–2	Boston Bruins (1977–78)	25–29–10
65	W	March 11, 1978	5–4	Colorado Rockies (1977–78)	26–29–10
66	T	March 12, 1978	4–4	Vancouver Canucks (1977–78)	26–29–11
67	T	March 16, 1978	3–3	@ Los Angeles Kings (1977–78)	26–29–12
68	W	March 18, 1978	5–4	@ Vancouver Canucks (1977–78)	27–29–12
69	L	March 19, 1978	4–6	@ Colorado Rockies (1977–78)	27–30–12
70	W	March 22, 1978	4–1	Atlanta Flames (1977–78)	28–30–12
71	T	March 25, 1978	2–2	@ Pittsburgh Penguins (1977–78)	28–30–13
72	W	March 26, 1978	4–1	@ Washington Capitals (1977–78)	29–30–13
73	W	March 28, 1978	7–0	Buffalo Sabres (1977–78)	30–30–13
74	L	March 30, 1978	0–4	Los Angeles Kings (1977–78)	30–31–13

April

Game	Result	Date	Score	Opponent	Record
75	L	April 1, 1978	0–2	@ Chicago Black Hawks (1977–78)	30–32–13
76	L	April 2, 1978	2–5	New York Islanders (1977–78)	30–33–13
77	T	April 5, 1978	5–5	@ Cleveland Barons (1977–78)	30–33–14
78	W	April 6, 1978	6–4	Pittsburgh Penguins (1977–78)	31–33–14
79	L	April 8, 1978	1–5	@ Montreal Canadiens (1977–78)	31–34–14
80	W	April 9, 1978	4–0	Montreal Canadiens (1977–78)	32–34–14

Legend: Win (2 points) Loss (0 points) Tie (1 point)

== Player statistics ==
=== Regular season ===
Scoring

Player	Pos	GP	G	A	Pts	PIM	+/-	PPG	SHG	GWG
Dale McCourt	C	76	33	39	72	10	10	10	3	5
Andre St. Laurent	C	77	31	39	70	108	7	10	0	4
Reed Larson	D	75	19	41	60	95	−8	7	1	4
Dennis Hextall	LW	78	16	33	49	195	−5	2	2	3
Nick Libett	LW	80	23	22	45	46	−3	1	1	1
Dan Maloney	LW	66	16	29	45	151	4	3	0	1
Paul Woods	LW	80	19	23	42	52	18	3	2	3
Bill Lochead	LW	77	20	16	36	47	6	2	0	4
Dennis Polonich	C/RW	79	16	19	35	254	−5	5	0	0
Vaclav Nedomansky	RW	63	11	17	28	2	−17	5	0	1
Greg Joly	D	79	7	20	27	73	−4	2	0	2
Perry Miller	D	62	4	17	21	120	−5	0	1	1
Rick Bowness	RW	61	8	11	19	76	−8	2	0	2
Terry Harper	D	80	2	17	19	85	19	0	0	0
Dennis Hull	LW	55	5	9	14	6	−20	2	0	1
Larry Wright	C	66	3	6	9	13	−12	0	0	0
Al Cameron	D	63	2	7	9	94	−12	1	0	0
Jean Hamel	D	32	2	6	8	34	3	0	0	0
Thommie Bergman	D	14	1	6	7	16	1	0	0	0
Errol Thompson	LW	14	5	1	6	2	−4	1	0	0
Danny Grant	RW	13	2	2	4	6	−2	1	0	0
Al McDonough	RW	13	2	2	4	4	2	0	0	0
Bob Ritchie	LW	11	2	2	4	0	−1	1	0	0
Rob Plumb	LW	7	2	1	3	0	−4	1	0	0
Larry Giroux	D	5	0	3	3	4	−5	0	0	0
J.P. LeBlanc	C	3	0	2	2	4	1	0	0	0
Jim Rutherford	G	43	0	2	2	2	0	0	0	0
Michel Bergeron	RW	3	1	0	1	0	−2	0	0	0
Ron Low	G	32	0	1	1	0	0	0	0	0
Roland Cloutier	C	1	0	0	0	0	−2	0	0	0
Ed Giacomin	G	9	0	0	0	0	0	0	0	0
John Hilworth	D	5	0	0	0	12	0	0	0	0
Fern LeBlanc	C	2	0	0	0	0	−2	0	0	0
Tim Sheehy	RW	15	0	0	0	0	−13	0	0	0
Rick Vasko	D	3	0	0	0	7	−1	0	0	0

Goaltending

Player	MIN	GP	W	L	T	GA	GAA	SO
Jim Rutherford	2468	43	20	17	4	134	3.26	1
Ron Low	1816	32	9	12	9	102	3.37	1
Ed Giacomin	516	9	3	5	1	27	3.14	0
Team:	4800	80	32	34	14	263	3.29	2

=== Playoffs ===
Scoring

Player	Pos	GP	G	A	Pts	PIM	PPG	SHG	GWG
Vaclav Nedomansky	RW	7	3	5	8	0	1	0	0
Dale McCourt	C	7	4	2	6	2	2	0	0
Paul Woods	LW	7	0	5	5	4	0	0	0
Nick Libett	LW	7	3	1	4	0	1	0	0
Bill Lochead	LW	7	3	0	3	6	0	0	1
Errol Thompson	LW	7	2	1	3	2	1	0	1
Dennis Hextall	LW	7	1	1	2	10	0	1	1
Andre St. Laurent	C	7	1	1	2	4	0	0	0
Thommie Bergman	D	7	0	2	2	2	0	0	0
Reed Larson	D	7	0	2	2	4	0	0	0
Dennis Polonich	C/RW	7	1	0	1	19	0	0	0
Al Cameron	D	7	0	1	1	2	0	0	0
Terry Harper	D	7	0	1	1	4	0	0	0
Jim Rutherford	G	3	0	1	1	0	0	0	0
Rick Bowness	RW	4	0	0	0	2	0	0	0
Larry Giroux	D	2	0	0	0	2	0	0	0
Jean Hamel	D	7	0	0	0	10	0	0	0
Dennis Hull	LW	7	0	0	0	2	0	0	0
Greg Joly	D	5	0	0	0	8	0	0	0
J.P. LeBlanc	C	2	0	0	0	0	0	0	0
Ron Low	G	4	0	0	0	0	0	0	0

Goaltending

Player	MIN	GP	W	L	GA	GAA	SO
Jim Rutherford	180	3	2	1	12	4.00	0
Ron Low	240	4	1	3	17	4.25	0
Team:	420	7	3	4	29	4.14	0

Note: GP = Games played; G = Goals; A = Assists; Pts = Points; +/- = Plus-minus PIM = Penalty minutes; PPG = Power-play goals; SHG = Short-handed goals; GWG = Game-winning goals;
MIN = Minutes played; W = Wins; L = Losses; T = Ties; GA = Goals against; GAA = Goals-against average; SO = Shutouts;

== Transactions ==
The Red Wings were involved in the following transactions during the 1977–78 season.

=== Trades ===
Player acquired	Acquired from	For
Andre St. Laurent	New York Islanders	Michel Bergeron
Cash	Philadelphia Flyers	Terry Murray
Dennis Hull	Chicago Blackhawks	Red Wings' 4th round draft pick in 1980
Errol Thompson, 1st and 2nd round draft pick in 1978, 1st round Draft Pick in 1980	Toronto Maple Leafs	Dan Maloney, 2nd round draft pick in 1980

=== Free agents ===
Player / Former team	Player / New team

== Draft picks ==
Detroit's picks at the 1977 NHL amateur draft in Mount Royal Hotel in Montreal.

Round	#	Player	Position	Nationality	College/junior/club team (League)
1	1	Dale McCourt	Center	Canada	St. Catharines Fincups (OHA)
3	37	Rick Vasko	Defense	Canada	Peterborough Petes (OHA)
4	55	John Hilworth	Defense	Canada	Medicine Hat Tigers (WCHL)
5	73	Jim Korn	Defense	United States	Providence College (ECAC)
6	91	Jim Baxter	Goaltender	Canada	Union College (ECAC)
7	109	Randy Wilson	Left wing	United States	Providence College (ECAC)
8	125	Raymond Roy	Center	United States	Sherbrooke Castors (QMJHL)
9	141	Kip Churchill	Center	Canada	Union College (ECAC)
10	155	Lance Gatoni	Defense	Canada	University of Toronto (CIAU)
11	163	Rob Plumb	Left wing	Canada	Kingston Canadians (OHA)
12	170	Alain Belanger	Left wing	Canada	Trois-Rivières Draveurs (QMJHL)
13	175	Dean Willers	Right wing	United Kingdom	Union College (ECAC)
14	178	Roland Cloutier	Center	Canada	Trois-Rivières Draveurs (QMJHL)
15	181	Ed Hill	Right wing	United States	University of Vermont (ECAC)
16	184	Val James	Left wing	United States	Quebec Remparts (QMJHL)
17	185	Grant Morin	Right wing	Canada	Calgary Centennials (WCHL)
^{Reference: "1977 NHL amateur draft hockeydraftcentral.com".}

== See also ==
- 1977–78 NHL season
