= 1977–78 Montreal Canadiens season =

NHL hockey team season (21st Championship)

1977–78 Montreal Canadiens
- Stanley Cup champions
- Wales Conference champions
- Norris Division champions
- Division: 1st Norris
- Conference: 1st Wales
- 1977–78 record: 59–10–11
- Home record: 32–4–4
- Road record: 27–6–7
- Goals for: 359
- Goals against: 183

Team information
- General manager: Sam Pollock
- Coach: Scotty Bowman
- Captain: Yvan Cournoyer
- Alternate captains: None
- Arena: Montreal Forum

Team leaders
- Goals: Guy Lafleur (60)
- Assists: Guy Lafleur (72)
- Points: Guy Lafleur (132)
- Penalty minutes: Gilles Lupien (108)
- Wins: Ken Dryden (37)
- Goals against average: Ken Dryden (2.05)

The 1977–78 Montreal Canadiens season was the team's 69th season. The Canadiens won their third straight Stanley Cup, and 21st overall.

== Regular season ==
=== Season standings ===
Norris Division
	GP	W	L	T	GF	GA	Pts
**Montreal Canadiens**	80	59	10	11	359	183	129
**Detroit Red Wings**	80	32	34	14	252	266	78
**Los Angeles Kings**	80	31	34	15	243	245	77
Pittsburgh Penguins	80	25	37	18	254	321	68
Washington Capitals	80	17	49	14	195	321	48

Note: GP = Games played, W = Wins, L = Losses, T = Ties, Pts = Points, GF = Goals for, GA = Goals against
Note: Teams that qualified for the playoffs are highlighted in bold.

=== Record vs. opponents ===
Norris Division record vs. opponents

**Vs. Wales Conference**

**Vs. Campbell Conference**

**Vs. Norris Division**

1977–78 NHL records
Team	**DET**	**LAK**	**MTL**	**PIT**	**WSH**	**Total**
Detroit	—	3–2–1	1–4–1	3–2–1	4–1–1	**11–9–4**
Los Angeles	2–3–1	—	1–4–1	3–0–3	4–2	**10–9–5**
Montreal	4–1–1	4–1–1	—	5–1	5–0–1	**18–3–3**
Pittsburgh	2–3–1	0–3–3	1–5	—	1–4–1	**4–15–5**
Washington	1–4–1	2–4	0–5–1	4–1–1	—	**7–12–5**

**Vs. Adams Division**

1977–78 NHL records
Team	**BOS**	**BUF**	**CLE**	**TOR**	**Total**
Detroit	0–4–1	2–2–1	2–2–1	1–2–2	**5–10–5**
Los Angeles	0–5	0–3–2	3–1–1	3–2	**6–11–3**
Montreal	4–0–1	2–3	4–1	4–0–1	**14–4–2**
Pittsburgh	0–5	0–0–5	5–0	3–2	**8–7–5**
Washington	0–4–1	1–3–1	3–2	0–4–1	**4–13–3**

**Vs. Patrick Division**

1977–78 NHL records
Team	**ATL**	**NYI**	**NYR**	**PHI**	**Total**
Detroit	2–1–1	0–4	1–2–1	1–2–1	**4–9–3**
Los Angeles	2–1–1	0–2–2	3–1	0–3–1	**5–7–4**
Montreal	2–0–2	4–0	3–1	2–0–2	**11–1–4**
Pittsburgh	1–3	1–2–1	2–0–2	0–3–1	**4–8–4**
Washington	2–1–1	0–4	0–2–2	0–4	**2–11–3**

**Vs. Smythe Division**

1977–78 NHL records
Team	**CHI**	**COL**	**MIN**	**STL**	**VAN**	**Total**
Detroit	1–3	2–1–1	4–0	3–1	2–1–1	**12–6–2**
Los Angeles	2–2	2–1–1	2–1–1	2–2	2–1–1	**10–7–3**
Montreal	3–0–1	4–0	2–2	4–0	3–0–1	**16–2–2**
Pittsburgh	2–1–1	2–1–1	2–2	2–1–1	1–2–1	**9–7–4**
Washington	0–3–1	2–1–1	1–2–1	1–1–2	0–4	**4–11–5**

== Schedule and results ==
1977–78 regular season
October

Game	Result	Date	Score	Opponent	Record
1	W	October 12, 1977	7–3	Minnesota North Stars (1977–78)	1–0–0
2	W	October 15, 1977	5–0	New York Rangers (1977–78)	2–0–0
3	W	October 16, 1977	2–0	@ Boston Bruins (1977–78)	3–0–0
4	W	October 19, 1977	5–3	@ Washington Capitals (1977–78)	4–0–0
5	T	October 20, 1977	2–2	@ Detroit Red Wings (1977–78)	4–0–1
6	W	October 23, 1977	6–2	@ New York Rangers (1977–78)	5–0–1
7	W	October 24, 1977	5–1	Washington Capitals (1977–78)	6–0–1
8	T	October 26, 1977	2–2	@ Toronto Maple Leafs (1977–78)	6–0–2
9	L	October 29, 1977	3–5	Los Angeles Kings (1977–78)	6–1–2
10	L	October 30, 1977	0–4	Buffalo Sabres (1977–78)	6–2–2

November

Game	Result	Date	Score	Opponent	Record
11	T	November 2, 1977	2–2	Atlanta Flames (1977–78)	6–2–3
12	W	November 5, 1977	5–2	Boston Bruins (1977–78)	7–2–3
13	L	November 7, 1977	3–5	Minnesota North Stars (1977–78)	7–3–3
14	W	November 10, 1977	5–1	@ New York Islanders (1977–78)	8–3–3
15	W	November 12, 1977	5–0	Toronto Maple Leafs (1977–78)	9–3–3
16	W	November 13, 1977	3–2	@ Chicago Black Hawks (1977–78)	10–3–3
17	W	November 16, 1977	4–1	@ Colorado Rockies (1977–78)	11–3–3
18	W	November 19, 1977	4–2	@ Los Angeles Kings (1977–78)	12–3–3
19	L	November 23, 1977	1–2	@ Cleveland Barons (1977–78)	12–4–3
20	W	November 24, 1977	4–1	Buffalo Sabres (1977–78)	13–4–3
21	W	November 26, 1977	3–1	Detroit Red Wings (1977–78)	14–4–3
22	W	November 29, 1977	9–1	Pittsburgh Penguins (1977–78)	15–4–3

December

Game	Result	Date	Score	Opponent	Record
23	L	December 1, 1977	1–3	@ Buffalo Sabres (1977–78)	15–5–3
24	W	December 3, 1977	3–2	Chicago Black Hawks (1977–78)	16–5–3
25	T	December 5, 1977	2–2	Atlanta Flames (1977–78)	16–5–4
26	W	December 8, 1977	8–1	St. Louis Blues (1977–78)	17–5–4
27	W	December 10, 1977	7–2	Vancouver Canucks (1977–78)	18–5–4
28	W	December 12, 1977	5–1	@ Cleveland Barons (1977–78)	19–5–4
29	L	December 14, 1977	2–3	@ Minnesota North Stars (1977–78)	19–6–4
30	L	December 17, 1977	3–5	@ Pittsburgh Penguins (1977–78)	19–7–4
31	W	December 18, 1977	2–0	@ Philadelphia Flyers (1977–78)	20–7–4
32	W	December 21, 1977	3–2	@ Toronto Maple Leafs (1977–78)	21–7–4
33	W	December 23, 1977	7–5	New York Islanders (1977–78)	22–7–4
34	W	December 27, 1977	5–3	Cleveland Barons (1977–78)	23–7–4
35	W	December 29, 1977	4–3	Pittsburgh Penguins (1977–78)	24–7–4
36	W	December 31, 1977	4–2	@ New York Islanders (1977–78)	25–7–4

January

Game	Result	Date	Score	Opponent	Record
37	W	January 3, 1978	2–0	@ St. Louis Blues (1977–78)	26–7–4
38	W	January 4, 1978	4–1	@ Atlanta Flames (1977–78)	27–7–4
39	T	January 9, 1978	3–3	Philadelphia Flyers (1977–78)	27–7–5
40	W	January 11, 1978	8–6	@ Pittsburgh Penguins (1977–78)	28–7–5
41	W	January 12, 1978	6–1	@ Detroit Red Wings (1977–78)	29–7–5
42	W	January 14, 1978	5–3	Boston Bruins (1977–78)	30–7–5
43	W	January 18, 1978	7–4	@ Cleveland Barons (1977–78)	31–7–5
44	T	January 19, 1978	1–1	@ Philadelphia Flyers (1977–78)	31–7–6
45	W	January 21, 1978	8–1	Vancouver Canucks (1977–78)	32–7–6
46	W	January 26, 1978	5–2	@ Atlanta Flames (1977–78)	33–7–6
47	W	January 28, 1978	6–3	Los Angeles Kings (1977–78)	34–7–6
48	W	January 31, 1978	5–3	@ Colorado Rockies (1977–78)	35–7–6

February

Game	Result	Date	Score	Opponent	Record
49	T	February 2, 1978	4–4	@ Vancouver Canucks (1977–78)	35–7–7
50	T	February 4, 1978	5–5	@ Los Angeles Kings (1977–78)	35–7–8
51	T	February 9, 1978	3–3	Chicago Black Hawks (1977–78)	35–7–9
52	W	February 11, 1978	7–3	St. Louis Blues (1977–78)	36–7–9
53	W	February 12, 1978	5–3	@ New York Rangers (1977–78)	37–7–9
54	W	February 15, 1978	6–2	@ St. Louis Blues (1977–78)	38–7–9
55	W	February 17, 1978	8–2	@ Washington Capitals (1977–78)	39–7–9
56	W	February 18, 1978	9–4	Colorado Rockies (1977–78)	40–7–9
57	W	February 20, 1978	4–2	Buffalo Sabres (1977–78)	41–7–9
58	W	February 23, 1978	5–1	Cleveland Barons (1977–78)	42–7–9
59	L	February 25, 1978	3–6	New York Rangers (1977–78)	42–8–9
60	W	February 26, 1978	2–1	New York Islanders (1977–78)	43–8–9
61	W	February 28, 1978	9–3	Detroit Red Wings (1977–78)	44–8–9

March

Game	Result	Date	Score	Opponent	Record
62	W	March 1, 1978	5–2	@ Pittsburgh Penguins (1977–78)	45–8–9
63	W	March 4, 1978	7–1	Philadelphia Flyers (1977–78)	46–8–9
64	L	March 6, 1978	1–2	@ Buffalo Sabres (1977–78)	46–9–9
65	W	March 8, 1978	4–3	Washington Capitals (1977–78)	47–9–9
66	W	March 9, 1978	4–1	Toronto Maple Leafs (1977–78)	48–9–9
67	W	March 11, 1978	5–3	Los Angeles Kings (1977–78)	49–9–9
68	W	March 13, 1978	5–2	@ Minnesota North Stars (1977–78)	50–9–9
69	W	March 15, 1978	6–2	@ Chicago Black Hawks (1977–78)	51–9–9
70	W	March 18, 1978	6–3	@ Los Angeles Kings (1977–78)	52–9–9
71	W	March 20, 1978	5–1	@ Vancouver Canucks (1977–78)	53–9–9
72	W	March 23, 1978	5–3	Colorado Rockies (1977–78)	54–9–9
73	W	March 25, 1978	5–0	Washington Capitals (1977–78)	55–9–9
74	T	March 26, 1978	2–2	@ Boston Bruins (1977–78)	55–9–10
75	W	March 29, 1978	6–2	Pittsburgh Penguins (1977–78)	56–9–10

April

Game	Result	Date	Score	Opponent	Record
76	W	April 1, 1978	7–1	Boston Bruins (1977–78)	57–9–10
77	T	April 2, 1978	4–4	@ Washington Capitals (1977–78)	57–9–11
78	W	April 5, 1978	6–3	@ Toronto Maple Leafs (1977–78)	58–9–11
79	W	April 8, 1978	5–1	Detroit Red Wings (1977–78)	59–9–11
80	L	April 9, 1978	0–4	@ Detroit Red Wings (1977–78)	59–10–11

Legend: Win (2 points) Loss (0 points) Tie (1 point)

== Playoffs ==
=== Stanley Cup ===
==== Boston Bruins vs. Montreal Canadiens ====
Date	Visitors	Score	Home	Score	Notes
May 13	Boston	1	Montreal	4	
May 16	Boston	2	Montreal	3	OT
May 18	Montreal	0	Boston	4	
May 21	Montreal	3	Boston	4	OT
May 23	Boston	1	Montreal	4	
May 25	Montreal	4	Boston	1	

Montreal wins the series 4–2.

== Player statistics ==
=== Regular season ===
==== Scoring ====
Player	Pos	GP	G	A	Pts	PIM	+/-	PPG	SHG	GWG
Guy Lafleur	RW	78	60	72	132	26	73	15	0	12
Jacques Lemaire	C	76	36	61	97	14	54	6	0	5
Steve Shutt	LW	80	49	37	86	24	56	16	0	7
Larry Robinson	D	80	13	52	65	39	71	3	2	5
Rejean Houle	W	76	30	28	58	50	39	3	0	5
Yvan Cournoyer	RW	68	24	29	53	12	39	4	0	6
Pierre Mondou	C	71	19	30	49	8	32	4	0	3
Pierre Larouche	C	44	17	32	49	11	32	3	0	1
Guy Lapointe	D	49	13	29	42	19	46	4	0	2
Serge Savard	D	77	8	34	42	24	62	4	0	1
Doug Risebrough	C	72	18	23	41	97	30	1	0	3
Yvon Lambert	LW	77	18	22	40	20	10	7	0	3
Doug Jarvis	C	80	11	28	39	23	12	2	2	1
Bob Gainey	LW	66	15	16	31	57	11	0	2	1
Bill Nyrop	D	72	5	21	26	37	56	1	2	1
Mario Tremblay	RW	56	10	14	24	44	6	0	1	0
Rick Chartraw	D/RW	68	4	12	16	64	16	0	0	1
Pierre Bouchard	D	59	4	6	10	29	27	0	0	1
Pete Mahovlich	C	17	3	5	8	4	6	0	0	1
Gilles Lupien	D	46	1	3	4	108	19	0	0	0
Michel Larocque	G	30	0	4	4	0	0	0	0	0
Brian Engblom	D	28	1	2	3	23	9	0	0	0
Ken Dryden	G	52	0	2	2	0	0	0	0	0
Murray Wilson	LW	12	0	1	1	0	−1	0	0	0
Pat Hughes	RW	3	0	0	0	2	−2	0	0	0
Mike Polich	C/LW	1	0	0	0	0	0	0	0	0
Rod Schutt	LW	2	0	0	0	0	0	0	0	0

==== Goaltending ====
Player	MIN	GP	W	L	T	GA	GAA	SO
Ken Dryden	3071	52	37	7	7	105	2.05	5
Michel Larocque	1729	30	22	3	4	77	2.67	1
Team:	4800	80	59	10	11	182	2.27	6

=== Playoffs ===
==== Scoring ====
Player	Pos	GP	G	A	Pts	PIM	PPG	SHG	GWG
Guy Lafleur	RW	15	10	11	21	16	3	0	2
Larry Robinson	D	15	4	17	21	6	2	0	0
Steve Shutt	LW	15	9	8	17	20	3	0	0
Jacques Lemaire	C	15	6	8	14	10	0	0	1
Yvan Cournoyer	RW	15	7	4	11	10	0	0	2
Rejean Houle	W	15	3	8	11	14	0	0	0
Pierre Mondou	C	15	3	7	10	4	2	0	1
Bob Gainey	LW	15	2	7	9	14	0	1	0
Doug Jarvis	C	15	3	5	8	12	1	0	1
Serge Savard	D	15	1	7	8	8	0	0	0
Guy Lapointe	D	14	1	6	7	16	1	0	0
Yvon Lambert	LW	15	2	4	6	6	1	0	1
Doug Risebrough	C	15	2	2	4	17	0	1	1
Bill Nyrop	D	12	0	4	4	6	0	0	0
Pierre Larouche	C	5	2	1	3	4	1	0	1
Mario Tremblay	RW	5	2	1	3	16	0	0	1
Rick Chartraw	D/RW	10	1	0	1	10	0	0	1
Pierre Bouchard	D	10	0	1	1	5	0	0	0
Ken Dryden	G	15	0	0	0	0	0	0	0
Brian Engblom	D	5	0	0	0	2	0	0	0
Gilles Lupien	D	8	0	0	0	17	0	0	0

==== Goaltending ====
Player	MIN	GP	W	L	GA	GAA	SO
Ken Dryden	919	15	12	3	29	1.89	2
Team:	919	15	12	3	29	1.89	2

Note:

Pos = Position;GP = Games played; G = Goals; A = Assists; Pts = Points; PIM = Penalty minutes; +/- = Plus/minus; PPG = Power-play goals; SHG = Short-handed goals; GWG = Game-winning goals
Pos = Position;GP = Games played; Min, TOI = Minutes played; W = Wins; L = Losses; T,T/OT = Ties; OTL = Overtime losses; GA = Goals-against; GAA = Goals-against average; SO = Shutouts; SA = Shots against; SV = Shots saved;SV% = Save percentage;

== Awards and records ==
- Prince of Wales Trophy
- Ken Dryden and Michel Larocque, Vezina Trophy
- Bob Gainey, Frank J. Selke Trophy
- Guy Lafleur, Art Ross Trophy
- Guy Lafleur, Hart Memorial Trophy
- Larry Robinson, Conn Smythe Trophy

== Draft picks ==
Round	#	Player	Position	Nationality	College/junior/club team (League)
1	10	Mark Napier	Right wing	Canada	Birmingham Bulls (WHA)
1	18	Norm Dupont	Left wing	Canada	Montreal Jr. Canadiens (QMJHL)
2	36	Rod Langway	Defence	United States	University of New Hampshire (ECAC)
3	43	Alain Cote	Defence	Canada	Chicoutimi (QMJHL)
3	46	Pierre Lagace	Left wing	Canada	Quebec Remparts (QMJHL)
3	49	Moe Robinson	Defence	Canada	Kingston Canadians (OMJHL)
3	54	Gordie Roberts	Defence	United States	New England Whalers (WHA)
4	64	Robert Holland	Goaltender	Canada	Montreal Juniors (QMJHL)
5	90	Gaetan Rochette	Left wing	Canada	Shawinigan Dynamos (QMJHL)
6	108	Bill Himmelright	Defence	United States	University of North Dakota (WCHA)
7	124	Richard Sevigny	Goaltender	Canada	Sherbrooke Castors (QMJHL)
8	137	Keith Hendrickson	Defence	United States	University of Minnesota-Duluth (WCHA)
8	140	Morgan Reilly	Right wing	United States	Colorado College (WCHA)
9	152	Barry Borrett	Goaltender	Canada	Cornwall Royals (QMJHL)
9	154	Sid Tanchak	Centre	Canada	Clarkson University (ECAC)
10	160	Mark Holden	Goaltender	United States	Brown University (ECAC)
10	162	Craig Laughlin	Right wing	Canada	Clarkson University (ECAC)
11	167	Dan Poulin	Defence	Canada	Chicoutimi Saguenéens (QMJHL)
11	169	Tom McDonell	Centre	Canada	Ottawa 67's (OMJHL)
12	173	Cary Farelli	Right wing	Canada	Toronto Marlboros (OMJHL)
12	174	Carey Walker	Goaltender	Canada	New Westminster Bruins (WCHL)
13	176	Mark Wells	Centre	United States	Bowling Green University (CCHA)
13	177	Stan Palmer	Defence	United States	University of Minnesota-Duluth (WCHA)
14	179	Jean Belisle	Goaltender	Canada	Chicoutimi Saguenéens (QMJHL)
14	180	Bob Daly	Goaltender	Canada	Ottawa 67's (OMJHL)
15	182	Bob Boileau	Right wing	Canada	Boston University (ECAC)
15	183	John Costello	Centre	United States	University of Massachusetts Lowell (ECAC)

== See also ==
- 1977–78 NHL season
