= 1977–78 St. Louis Blues season =

National Hockey League team season

1977–78 St. Louis Blues
- Division: 4th Smythe
- Conference: 8th Campbell
- 1977–78 record: 20–47–13
- Home record: 12–20–8
- Road record: 8–27–5
- Goals for: 195
- Goals against: 304

Team information
- General manager: Emile Francis
- Coach: Leo Boivin
- Captain: Red Berenson
- Alternate captains: None
- Arena: St. Louis Arena

Team leaders
- Goals: Garry Unger (32)
- Assists: Red Berenson (25)
- Points: Garry Unger (52)
- Penalty minutes: Brian Sutter (123)
- Wins: Phil Myre (11)
- Goals against average: Doug Grant (2.89)

The 1977–78 St. Louis Blues season was the 11th for the franchise in St. Louis, Missouri. Prior to the season, the team's founders, Sid Salomon Jr. and Sid Salomon III, sold the team to pet food giant Ralston Purina, and the St. Louis Arena became the Checkerdome. The Blues finished the season with a record of 20 wins, 47 losses and 13 ties for 53 points, and finished out of the playoffs for only the second time in team history and for the first time since the 1973–74 season.

== Regular season ==
=== Final standings ===
Smythe Division
| | GP | W | L | T | GF | GA | Pts |
|---|---|---|---|---|---|---|---|
| **Chicago Black Hawks** | 80 | 32 | 29 | 19 | 230 | 220 | 83 |
| **Colorado Rockies** | 80 | 19 | 40 | 21 | 257 | 305 | 59 |
| Vancouver Canucks | 80 | 20 | 43 | 17 | 239 | 320 | 57 |
| St. Louis Blues | 80 | 20 | 47 | 13 | 195 | 304 | 53 |
| Minnesota North Stars | 80 | 18 | 53 | 9 | 218 | 325 | 45 |

Note: GP = Games played, W = Wins, L = Losses, T = Ties, Pts = Points, GF = Goals for, GA = Goals against
Note: Teams that qualified for the playoffs are highlighted in bold.

=== Record vs. opponents ===
Smythe Division record vs. opponents

**Vs. Campbell Conference**

**Vs. Wales Conference**

**Vs. Smythe Division**

1977–78 NHL records
| Team | **CHI** | **COL** | **MIN** | **STL** | **VAN** | **Total** |
|---|---|---|---|---|---|---|
| Chicago | — | 1–1–4 | 5–0–1 | 3–1–2 | 2–3–1 | **11–5–8** |
| Colorado | 1–1–4 | — | 3–1–2 | 1–4–1 | 3–0–3 | **8–6–10** |
| Minnesota | 0–5–1 | 1–3–2 | — | 1–4–1 | 3–3 | **5–15–4** |
| St. Louis | 1–3–2 | 4–1–1 | 4–1–1 | — | 3–3 | **12–8–4** |
| Vancouver | 3–2–1 | 0–3–3 | 3–3 | 3–3 | — | **9–11–4** |

**Vs. Patrick Division**

1977–78 NHL records
| Team | **ATL** | **NYI** | **NYR** | **PHI** | **Total** |
|---|---|---|---|---|---|
| Chicago | 2–1–2 | 1–2–2 | 1–3–1 | 2–2–1 | **6–8–6** |
| Colorado | 1–2–2 | 0–4–1 | 2–2–1 | 2–3 | **5–11–4** |
| Minnesota | 1–4 | 1–4 | 0–3–2 | 2–3 | **4–14–2** |
| St. Louis | 0–4–1 | 0–4–1 | 0–4–1 | 1–4 | **1–16–3** |
| Vancouver | 1–2–2 | 0–5 | 1–4 | 0–5 | **2–16–2** |

**Vs. Adams Division**

1977–78 NHL records
| Team | **BOS** | **BUF** | **CLE** | **TOR** | **Total** |
|---|---|---|---|---|---|
| Chicago | 1–3 | 1–2–1 | 3–1 | 1–2–1 | **6–8–2** |
| Colorado | 0–3–1 | 1–3 | 1–1–2 | 0–4 | **2–11–3** |
| Minnesota | 1–3 | 1–3 | 0–3–1 | 0–4 | **2–13–1** |
| St. Louis | 0–4 | 0–4 | 2–1–1 | 0–2–2 | **2–11–3** |
| Vancouver | 0–2–2 | 0–1–3 | 1–2–1 | 0–3–1 | **1–8–7** |

**Vs. Norris Division**

1977–78 NHL records
| Team | **DET** | **LAK** | **MTL** | **PIT** | **WSH** | **Total** |
|---|---|---|---|---|---|---|
| Chicago | 3–1 | 2–2 | 0–3–1 | 1–2–1 | 3–0–1 | **9–8–3** |
| Colorado | 1–2–1 | 1–2–1 | 0–4 | 1–2–1 | 1–2–1 | **4–12–4** |
| Minnesota | 0–4 | 1–2–1 | 2–2 | 2–2 | 2–1–1 | **7–11–2** |
| St. Louis | 1–3 | 2–2 | 0–4 | 1–2–1 | 1–1–2 | **5–12–3** |
| Vancouver | 1–2–1 | 1–2–1 | 0–3–1 | 2–1–1 | 4–0 | **8–8–4** |

== Schedule and results ==
1977–78 regular season
October

| Game | Result | Date | Score | Opponent | Record |
|---|---|---|---|---|---|
| 1 | L | October 12, 1977 | 2–4 | @ Pittsburgh Penguins (1977–78) | 0–1–0 |
| 2 | L | October 15, 1977 | 1–3 | @ Atlanta Flames (1977–78) | 0–2–0 |
| 3 | L | October 16, 1977 | 0–7 | @ Philadelphia Flyers (1977–78) | 0–3–0 |
| 4 | L | October 19, 1977 | 3–7 | Boston Bruins (1977–78) | 0–4–0 |
| 5 | L | October 22, 1977 | 2–3 | Cleveland Barons (1977–78) | 0–5–0 |
| 6 | L | October 23, 1977 | 0–2 | @ Chicago Black Hawks (1977–78) | 0–6–0 |
| 7 | T | October 25, 1977 | 2–2 | Atlanta Flames (1977–78) | 0–6–1 |
| 8 | L | October 26, 1977 | 2–6 | @ New York Rangers (1977–78) | 0–7–1 |
| 9 | L | October 29, 1977 | 3–7 | Philadelphia Flyers (1977–78) | 0–8–1 |

November

| Game | Result | Date | Score | Opponent | Record |
|---|---|---|---|---|---|
| 10 | W | November 1, 1977 | 7–2 | Los Angeles Kings (1977–78) | 1–8–1 |
| 11 | T | November 2, 1977 | 4–4 | @ Cleveland Barons (1977–78) | 1–8–2 |
| 12 | L | November 5, 1977 | 1–3 | Buffalo Sabres (1977–78) | 1–9–2 |
| 13 | L | November 6, 1977 | 4–7 | @ Buffalo Sabres (1977–78) | 1–10–2 |
| 14 | W | November 9, 1977 | 8–6 | Vancouver Canucks (1977–78) | 2–10–2 |
| 15 | W | November 11, 1977 | 2–1 | @ Colorado Rockies (1977–78) | 3–10–2 |
| 16 | W | November 12, 1977 | 3–1 | Colorado Rockies (1977–78) | 4–10–2 |
| 17 | T | November 15, 1977 | 2–2 | Washington Capitals (1977–78) | 4–10–3 |
| 18 | L | November 16, 1977 | 1–10 | @ Detroit Red Wings (1977–78) | 4–11–3 |
| 19 | L | November 19, 1977 | 1–2 | Detroit Red Wings (1977–78) | 4–12–3 |
| 20 | L | November 23, 1977 | 2–3 | Toronto Maple Leafs (1977–78) | 4–13–3 |
| 21 | W | November 26, 1977 | 2–1 | @ Cleveland Barons (1977–78) | 5–13–3 |
| 22 | L | November 27, 1977 | 1–4 | @ Boston Bruins (1977–78) | 5–14–3 |
| 23 | L | November 30, 1977 | 0–4 | New York Rangers (1977–78) | 5–15–3 |

December

| Game | Result | Date | Score | Opponent | Record |
|---|---|---|---|---|---|
| 24 | L | December 3, 1977 | 2–7 | New York Islanders (1977–78) | 5–16–3 |
| 25 | L | December 6, 1977 | 1–6 | Los Angeles Kings (1977–78) | 5–17–3 |
| 26 | L | December 8, 1977 | 1–8 | @ Montreal Canadiens (1977–78) | 5–18–3 |
| 27 | W | December 10, 1977 | 6–4 | Colorado Rockies (1977–78) | 6–18–3 |
| 28 | L | December 11, 1977 | 1–2 | @ Washington Capitals (1977–78) | 6–19–3 |
| 29 | W | December 14, 1977 | 3–2 | Pittsburgh Penguins (1977–78) | 7–19–3 |
| 30 | L | December 17, 1977 | 2–3 | Detroit Red Wings (1977–78) | 7–20–3 |
| 31 | T | December 19, 1977 | 4–4 | @ Toronto Maple Leafs (1977–78) | 7–20–4 |
| 32 | L | December 21, 1977 | 2–6 | Chicago Black Hawks (1977–78) | 7–21–4 |
| 33 | L | December 22, 1977 | 3–6 | @ New York Islanders (1977–78) | 7–22–4 |
| 34 | L | December 27, 1977 | 0–1 | @ Minnesota North Stars (1977–78) | 7–23–4 |
| 35 | L | December 29, 1977 | 4–5 | @ Atlanta Flames (1977–78) | 7–24–4 |
| 36 | W | December 31, 1977 | 3–2 | Philadelphia Flyers (1977–78) | 8–24–4 |

January

| Game | Result | Date | Score | Opponent | Record |
|---|---|---|---|---|---|
| 37 | L | January 3, 1978 | 0–2 | Montreal Canadiens (1977–78) | 8–25–4 |
| 38 | T | January 7, 1978 | 0–0 | Chicago Black Hawks (1977–78) | 8–25–5 |
| 39 | W | January 8, 1978 | 3–1 | @ Minnesota North Stars (1977–78) | 9–25–5 |
| 40 | L | January 11, 1978 | 4–6 | @ Vancouver Canucks (1977–78) | 9–26–5 |
| 41 | W | January 13, 1978 | 2–1 | @ Colorado Rockies (1977–78) | 10–26–5 |
| 42 | W | January 14, 1978 | 5–2 | Minnesota North Stars (1977–78) | 11–26–5 |
| 43 | T | January 17, 1978 | 2–2 | Toronto Maple Leafs (1977–78) | 11–26–6 |
| 44 | L | January 19, 1978 | 0–3 | New York Islanders (1977–78) | 11–27–6 |
| 45 | L | January 21, 1978 | 1–3 | Buffalo Sabres (1977–78) | 11–28–6 |
| 46 | L | January 22, 1978 | 1–3 | @ Chicago Black Hawks (1977–78) | 11–29–6 |
| 47 | L | January 26, 1978 | 1–5 | @ Los Angeles Kings (1977–78) | 11–30–6 |
| 48 | L | January 28, 1978 | 3–8 | @ Vancouver Canucks (1977–78) | 11–31–6 |

February

| Game | Result | Date | Score | Opponent | Record |
|---|---|---|---|---|---|
| 49 | L | February 1, 1978 | 3–5 | Boston Bruins (1977–78) | 11–32–6 |
| 50 | T | February 4, 1978 | 2–2 | New York Rangers (1977–78) | 11–32–7 |
| 51 | L | February 6, 1978 | 0–2 | @ Philadelphia Flyers (1977–78) | 11–33–7 |
| 52 | L | February 8, 1978 | 4–5 | @ Toronto Maple Leafs (1977–78) | 11–34–7 |
| 53 | L | February 11, 1978 | 3–7 | @ Montreal Canadiens (1977–78) | 11–35–7 |
| 54 | L | February 15, 1978 | 2–6 | Montreal Canadiens (1977–78) | 11–36–7 |
| 55 | W | February 18, 1978 | 4–3 | Vancouver Canucks (1977–78) | 12–36–7 |
| 56 | L | February 19, 1978 | 2–6 | @ Buffalo Sabres (1977–78) | 12–37–7 |
| 57 | L | February 21, 1978 | 4–5 | Pittsburgh Penguins (1977–78) | 12–38–7 |
| 58 | T | February 22, 1978 | 2–2 | @ Pittsburgh Penguins (1977–78) | 12–38–8 |
| 59 | T | February 25, 1978 | 5–5 | Colorado Rockies (1977–78) | 12–38–9 |
| 60 | W | February 26, 1978 | 3–1 | @ Detroit Red Wings (1977–78) | 13–38–9 |
| 61 | W | February 28, 1978 | 7–1 | Minnesota North Stars (1977–78) | 14–38–9 |

March

| Game | Result | Date | Score | Opponent | Record |
|---|---|---|---|---|---|
| 62 | W | March 1, 1978 | 3–2 | @ Minnesota North Stars (1977–78) | 15–38–9 |
| 63 | T | March 4, 1978 | 3–3 | Washington Capitals (1977–78) | 15–38–10 |
| 64 | L | March 5, 1978 | 1–7 | @ Philadelphia Flyers (1977–78) | 15–39–10 |
| 65 | L | March 7, 1978 | 2–7 | @ Boston Bruins (1977–78) | 15–40–10 |
| 66 | L | March 9, 1978 | 3–6 | New York Islanders (1977–78) | 15–41–10 |
| 67 | T | March 11, 1978 | 1–1 | Minnesota North Stars (1977–78) | 15–41–11 |
| 68 | T | March 14, 1978 | 3–3 | @ New York Islanders (1977–78) | 15–41–12 |
| 69 | L | March 15, 1978 | 2–6 | Atlanta Flames (1977–78) | 15–42–12 |
| 70 | W | March 18, 1978 | 5–4 | Chicago Black Hawks (1977–78) | 16–42–12 |
| 71 | W | March 19, 1978 | 3–2 | @ Washington Capitals (1977–78) | 17–42–12 |
| 72 | L | March 22, 1978 | 1–6 | New York Rangers (1977–78) | 17–43–12 |
| 73 | L | March 23, 1978 | 3–5 | @ Atlanta Flames (1977–78) | 17–44–12 |
| 74 | T | March 25, 1978 | 2–2 | @ Chicago Black Hawks (1977–78) | 17–44–13 |
| 75 | L | March 27, 1978 | 2–5 | @ New York Rangers (1977–78) | 17–45–13 |
| 76 | W | March 29, 1978 | 3–1 | Vancouver Canucks (1977–78) | 18–45–13 |

April

| Game | Result | Date | Score | Opponent | Record |
|---|---|---|---|---|---|
| 77 | W | April 1, 1978 | 3–1 | Cleveland Barons (1977–78) | 19–45–13 |
| 78 | L | April 4, 1978 | 2–3 | @ Vancouver Canucks (1977–78) | 19–46–13 |
| 79 | W | April 5, 1978 | 3–2 | @ Los Angeles Kings (1977–78) | 20–46–13 |
| 80 | L | April 8, 1978 | 2–5 | @ Colorado Rockies (1977–78) | 20–47–13 |

Legend: Win (2 points) Loss (0 points) Tie (1 point)

== Player statistics ==
=== Regular season ===
Scoring

| Player | Pos | GP | G | A | Pts | PIM | +/- | PPG | SHG | GWG |
|---|---|---|---|---|---|---|---|---|---|---|
| Garry Unger | C | 80 | 32 | 20 | 52 | 66 | −35 | 10 | 0 | 5 |
| Bernie Federko | C | 72 | 17 | 24 | 41 | 27 | −35 | 4 | 0 | 1 |
| Inge Hammarstrom | LW | 70 | 19 | 19 | 38 | 4 | −21 | 3 | 0 | 2 |
| Red Berenson | C | 80 | 13 | 25 | 38 | 12 | −20 | 0 | 1 | 2 |
| Larry Patey | C | 80 | 17 | 17 | 34 | 29 | −20 | 3 | 0 | 3 |
| Bill Fairbairn | RW | 60 | 14 | 16 | 30 | 10 | −23 | 2 | 1 | 1 |
| Curt Bennett | LW | 50 | 7 | 17 | 24 | 54 | −22 | 1 | 0 | 1 |
| Brian Sutter | LW | 78 | 9 | 13 | 22 | 123 | −38 | 4 | 0 | 1 |
| Claude Larose | RW | 69 | 8 | 13 | 21 | 20 | −19 | 2 | 0 | 0 |
| Bob MacMillan | RW | 28 | 7 | 12 | 19 | 23 | −11 | 3 | 0 | 0 |
| Barry Gibbs | D | 51 | 6 | 12 | 18 | 45 | −11 | 4 | 0 | 0 |
| Bruce Affleck | D | 75 | 4 | 14 | 18 | 26 | −56 | 0 | 0 | 1 |
| Jack Brownschidle | D | 40 | 2 | 15 | 17 | 23 | −11 | 1 | 0 | 0 |
| Dick Redmond | D | 28 | 4 | 11 | 15 | 16 | −14 | 2 | 0 | 0 |
| Brian Ogilvie | C | 32 | 6 | 8 | 14 | 12 | −12 | 3 | 0 | 0 |
| Jim Roberts | D/RW | 75 | 4 | 10 | 14 | 39 | −20 | 0 | 0 | 1 |
| Bob Hess | D | 55 | 2 | 12 | 14 | 16 | 0 | 0 | 0 | 0 |
| Rod Seiling | D | 78 | 1 | 11 | 12 | 40 | −48 | 0 | 0 | 0 |
| Gary Holt | LW | 49 | 7 | 4 | 11 | 81 | −6 | 0 | 0 | 1 |
| Rick Bourbonnais | RW | 31 | 3 | 7 | 10 | 11 | −12 | 1 | 0 | 0 |
| Neil Komadoski | D | 33 | 2 | 8 | 10 | 73 | −29 | 0 | 0 | 0 |
| Tony Currie | RW | 22 | 4 | 5 | 9 | 4 | −10 | 1 | 0 | 0 |
| Ken Richardson | C | 12 | 2 | 5 | 7 | 2 | 4 | 0 | 0 | 0 |
| John Smrke | LW | 18 | 2 | 4 | 6 | 11 | −7 | 0 | 0 | 0 |
| Len Frig | D | 30 | 1 | 3 | 4 | 45 | −13 | 0 | 0 | 1 |
| Floyd Thomson | LW | 6 | 1 | 1 | 2 | 4 | −3 | 0 | 0 | 0 |
| Jerry Butler | RW | 9 | 0 | 2 | 2 | 5 | −6 | 0 | 0 | 0 |
| Phil Myre | G | 44 | 0 | 2 | 2 | 10 | 0 | 0 | 0 | 0 |
| Doug Palazzari | C | 3 | 1 | 0 | 1 | 0 | −2 | 0 | 0 | 0 |
| Yves Belanger | G | 3 | 0 | 0 | 0 | 0 | 0 | 0 | 0 | 0 |
| Doug Grant | G | 9 | 0 | 0 | 0 | 0 | 0 | 0 | 0 | 0 |
| Eddie Johnston | G | 12 | 0 | 0 | 0 | 0 | 0 | 0 | 0 | 0 |
| Bob Plager | D | 18 | 0 | 0 | 0 | 4 | −8 | 0 | 0 | 0 |
| Ed Staniowski | G | 17 | 0 | 0 | 0 | 0 | 0 | 0 | 0 | 0 |

Goaltending

| Player | MIN | GP | W | L | T | GA | GAA | SO |
|---|---|---|---|---|---|---|---|---|
| Phil Myre | 2620 | 44 | 11 | 25 | 8 | 159 | 3.64 | 1 |
| Eddie Johnston | 650 | 12 | 5 | 6 | 1 | 45 | 4.15 | 0 |
| Doug Grant | 500 | 9 | 3 | 3 | 2 | 24 | 2.88 | 0 |
| Ed Staniowski | 886 | 17 | 1 | 10 | 2 | 57 | 3.86 | 0 |
| Yves Belanger | 144 | 3 | 0 | 3 | 0 | 15 | 6.25 | 0 |
| Team: | 4800 | 80 | 20 | 47 | 13 | 300 | 3.75 | 1 |

Note:

Pos = Position;GP = Games played; G = Goals; A = Assists; Pts = Points; PIM = Penalty minutes; +/- = Plus/minus; PPG = Power-play goals; SHG = Short-handed goals; GWG = Game-winning goals
Pos = Position;GP = Games played; Min, TOI = Minutes played; W = Wins; L = Losses; T,T/OT = Ties; OTL = Overtime losses; GA = Goals-against; GAA = Goals-against average; SO = Shutouts; SA = Shots against; SV = Shots saved;SV% = Save percentage;

== Draft picks ==
St. Louis's draft picks at the 1977 NHL amateur draft held at the Mount Royal Hotel in Montreal.

| Round | # | Player | Nationality | College/Junior/Club team (League) |
|---|---|---|---|---|
| 1 | 9 | Scott Campbell | Canada | London Knights (OHA) |
| 2 | 27 | Neil LaBatte | Canada | Toronto Marlboros (OMJHL) |
| 3 | 45 | Tom Roulston | Canada | Winnipeg Monarchs (WCHL) |
| 4 | 63 | Tony Currie | Canada | Portland Winter Hawks (WCHL) |
| 5 | 81 | Bruce Hamilton | Canada | Saskatoon Blades (WCHL) |
| 6 | 99 | Gary McMonagle | Canada | Peterborough Petes (OMJHL) |
| 7 | 117 | Matti Forss | Finland | Rauma (Finland) |
| 8 | 132 | Raimo Hirvonen | Finland | Helsinki IFK (Finland) |
| 9 | 147 | Bjorn Olsson | Sweden | Karlstad (Sweden) |

== See also ==
- 1977–78 NHL season
