= Inge Hammarström =

Swedish ice hockey player

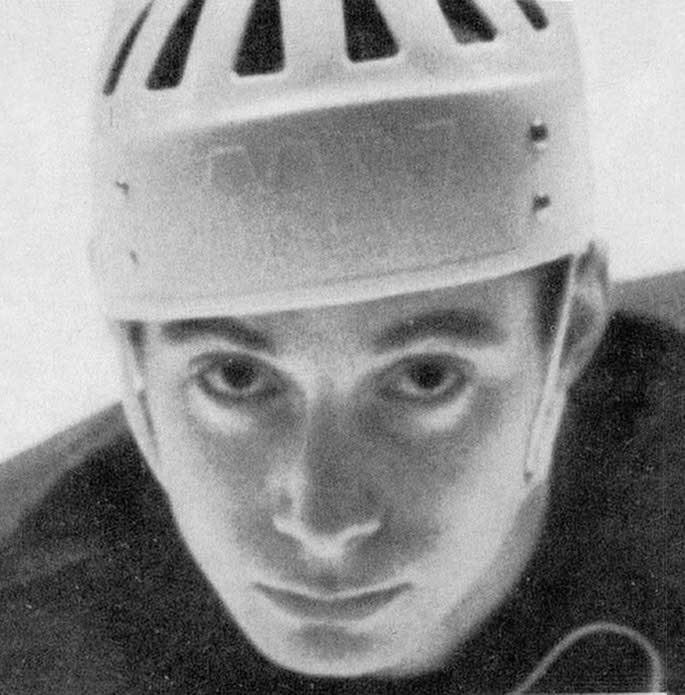
- Born: 20 January 1948 (age 78) Timrå, Sweden
- Height: 6 ft 0 in (183 cm)
- Weight: 182 lb (83 kg; 13 st 0 lb)
- Position: Left wing
- Shot: Left
- Played for: Wifsta/Östrands IF; Timrå IK; Brynäs IF; Toronto Maple Leafs; St. Louis Blues
- National team: Sweden
- Playing career: 1964–1982

Hans Inge Hammarström (born 20 January 1948) is a Swedish former professional ice hockey left winger. He played six seasons in the National Hockey League (NHL) for the Toronto Maple Leafs and St. Louis Blues between 1973 and 1979. The rest of his career, which lasted from 1964 to 1982, was spent in the Swedish Division 1 and Elitserien, the top leagues at the time. Internationally Hammarström played for the Swedish national team at several tournaments, including the 1972 Winter Olympics and five World Championships. After retiring Hammarström worked as a scout.

== Playing career ==
Hammarström played his first ice hockey games at the top national league level in 1963 for Timrå IK, at the age of 15. The 1968–69 season he left for Brynäs IF where he would win the Swedish Championship four times (1970, 1971, 1972 and later in 1980).

In 1973, Hammarström became the first player from Timrå IK ever to play in the NHL. Along with Börje Salming, he was also one of the first two Europeans to play with the Toronto Maple Leafs. Both Hammarström and Salming had to debunk the misconception among Canadians in the NHL of the "chicken Swede." An example came from Maple Leafs team owner Harold Ballard who once complained, "Hammarstrom could go into the corner with a dozen eggs in his pocket and not break one of them." He went on to spend four seasons with the Maple Leafs and two for the St. Louis Blues. He had been traded from the Maple Leafs to the Blues for Jerry Butler on 1 November 1977. His career ended in 1982, aged 35, after another three seasons with Brynäs IF.

== Olympics ==
He competed as a member of the Sweden men's national ice hockey team at the 1972 Winter Olympics held in Japan.

== After retirement ==
After his playing career ended, Hammarström began working as a European-based ice hockey scout, including a stint with Central Scouting. From 1990 to 2008, he was the chief European scout for the Philadelphia Flyers. He also worked with the Vancouver Canucks from 2008 to 2018.

Hammarström is credited with being the scout who pushed the hardest for Philadelphia to select Peter Forsberg with the sixth overall pick of the 1991 NHL entry draft. At the time, the pick was considered a surprise. Forsberg had been ranked considerably lower by The Hockey News in its 1991 Draft Preview, and most observers expected the player to be taken late in the first round or early in the second round of the draft.

== Career statistics ==
=== Regular season and playoffs ===
			Regular season					Playoffs
Season	Team	League	GP	G	A	Pts	PIM	GP	G	A	Pts	PIM
1963–64	Wifsta/Östrand-Fagerviks IF	SWE	4	0	—	—	—	—	—	—	—	—
1964–65	Wifsta/Östrand-Fagerviks IF	SWE	20	12	5	17	2	—	—	—	—	—
1965–66	Wifsta/Östrand-Fagerviks IF	SWE	21	9	8	17	2	2	0	0	0	0
1966–67	Timrå IK	SWE	19	14	11	25	4	—	—	—	—	—
1967–68	Timrå IK	SWE	21	14	10	24	8	—	—	—	—	—
1968–69	Brynäs IF	SWE	6	4	1	5	0	—	—	—	—	—
1969–70	Brynäs IF	SWE	28	14	5	19	4	—	—	—	—	—
1970–71	Brynäs IF	SWE	28	10	13	23	8	—	—	—	—	—
1971–72	Brynäs IF	SWE	28	19	10	29	10	—	—	—	—	—
1972–73	Brynäs IF	SWE	28	18	11	29	14	—	—	—	—	—
1973–74	Toronto Maple Leafs	NHL	66	20	23	43	14	4	1	0	1	0
1974–75	Toronto Maple Leafs	NHL	69	21	20	41	23	7	1	3	4	4
1975–76	Toronto Maple Leafs	NHL	76	19	21	40	21	—	—	—	—	—
1976–77	Toronto Maple Leafs	NHL	78	24	17	41	16	2	0	0	0	0
1977–78	Toronto Maple Leafs	NHL	3	1	1	2	0	—	—	—	—	—
1977–78	St. Louis Blues	NHL	70	19	19	38	4	—	—	—	—	—
1978–79	St. Louis Blues	NHL	65	12	22	34	8	—	—	—	—	—
1979–80	Brynäs IF	SWE	34	16	11	27	32	7	5	3	8	6
1980–81	Brynäs IF	SWE	29	13	8	21	20	—	—	—	—	—
1981–82	Brynäs IF	SWE	34	10	12	22	20	—	—	—	—	—
SWE totals			300	153	105	258	124	9	5	3	8	6
NHL totals			427	116	123	239	86	13	2	3	5	4

=== International ===
Medal record

Representing Sweden

World Championships
Silver medal – second place	1973 Soviet Union	
Silver medal – second place	1981 Sweden	
Bronze medal – third place	1971 Switzerland	
Bronze medal – third place	1972 Czechoslovakia	
Bronze medal – third place	1979 Soviet Union	

Year	Team	Event	GP	G	A	Pts	PIM
1971	Sweden	WC	7	2	1	3	4
1972	Sweden	OLY	6	4	2	6	0
1972	Sweden	WC	10	6	0	6	6
1973	Sweden	WC	10	6	3	9	2
1976	Sweden	CC	5	1	2	3	2
1979	Sweden	WC	8	4	1	5	2
1981	Sweden	WC	6	1	1	2	2
Senior totals			52	24	10	34	18
