= Dan Newman (ice hockey) =

Canadian ice hockey player

- Born: January 26, 1952 (age 73); Windsor, Ontario, Canada
- Height: 6 ft 1 in (185 cm)
- Weight: 195 lb (88 kg; 13 st 13 lb)
- Position: Defence
- Shot: Left
- Played for: New York Rangers; Montreal Canadiens; Edmonton Oilers
- NHL draft: Undrafted
- Playing career: 1972–1980

Daniel Kenneth Newman (born January 26, 1952) is a Canadian former professional ice hockey player who played 126 games in the National Hockey League (NHL) for three teams between 1976 and 1980. He had natural offensive talent and was capable of mixing it up when the game turned rough.

== Playing career ==
Newman played two seasons with St. Clair College then split the 1972–73 season between the American Hockey League (AHL) and International Hockey League (IHL). He then played three years with the Port Huron Flags/Wings and scored 39 goals in 1975–76 for the New York Rangers affiliate. Newman played 100 games for the Rangers over two seasons.

Newman was claimed in the 1978 NHL Waiver Draft by the powerhouse Montreal Canadiens and he played 16 games for them in 1978–79. He also dressed for one playoff game, but did not play; consequently, his name was left off the Stanley Cup, because he did not qualify. He was traded to the Edmonton Oilers in 1979–80 along with Dave Lumley in exchange for the draft pick the Habs used to take Ric Nattress. Newman retired in 1980 after playing ten games in Edmonton and the rest in the minors. He currently is playing with the Detroit Red Wings Alumni.

== Career statistics ==
=== Regular season and playoffs ===
			Regular season					Playoffs
Season	Team	League	GP	G	A	Pts	PIM	GP	G	A	Pts	PIM
1970–71	St. Clair County Community College	NCAA III	22	13	17	30	42	—	—	—	—	—
1971–72	St. Clair County Community College	NCAA III	20	28	13	41	—	—	—	—	—	—
1972–73	Port Huron Wings	IHL	61	8	14	22	27	3	0	0	0	0
1972–73	Virginia Wings	AHL	5	1	0	1	0	—	—	—	—	—
1973–74	Port Huron Wings	IHL	66	14	16	30	129	—	—	—	—	—
1974–75	Port Huron Wings	IHL	72	8	22	30	72	5	1	2	3	0
1975–76	Port Huron Wings	IHL	75	39	45	84	114	15	6	9	15	35
1976–77	New York Rangers	NHL	41	9	8	17	37	—	—	—	—	—
1976–77	New Haven Nighthawks	AHL	33	12	17	29	57	—	—	—	—	—
1977–78	New York Rangers	NHL	59	5	13	18	22	3	0	0	0	4
1977–78	New Haven Nighthawks	AHL	8	2	4	6	7	—	—	—	—	—
1978–79	Montreal Canadiens	NHL	16	0	2	2	4	—	—	—	—	—
1978–79	Nova Scotia Voyageurs	AHL	54	24	22	46	54	9	3	1	4	2
1979–80	Edmonton Oilers	NHL	10	3	1	4	0	—	—	—	—	—
1979–80	Houston Apollos	CHL	14	5	9	14	4	—	—	—	—	—
1979–80	Binghamton Dusters	AHL	55	11	17	28	50	—	—	—	—	—
IHL totals			274	69	97	166	342	23	7	11	18	35
NHL totals			126	17	24	41	63	3	0	0	0	4
