= Jim Cunningham (ice hockey) =

American ice hockey player (1956–2011)

- Born: August 15, 1956 Saint Paul, Minnesota, U.S.
- Died: April 29, 2011 (aged 54) Shoreview, Minnesota, U.S.
- Height: 5 ft 11 in (180 cm)
- Weight: 185 lb (84 kg; 13 st 3 lb)
- Position: Left wing
- Shot: Left
- Played for: Philadelphia Flyers
- NHL draft: Undrafted
- Playing career: 1977–1984

James John Cunningham (August 15, 1956 – April 29, 2011) was an American professional ice hockey player. He played one game in the National Hockey League for the Philadelphia Flyers during the 1977–78 season, on February 28, 1978 against the Boston Bruins. The rest of his career, which lasted from 1977 to 1984, was spent in the minor leagues.

== Personal life ==
Cunningham was struck and killed by a train on April 29, 2011, in Shoreview, Minnesota.

== Career statistics ==
=== Regular season and playoffs ===
			Regular season					Playoffs
Season	Team	League	GP	G	A	Pts	PIM	GP	G	A	Pts	PIM
1973–74	St. Paul Vulcans	MidJHL	—	—	—	—	—	—	—	—	—	—
1974–75	St. Paul Vulcans	MidJHL	57	21	31	52	183	—	—	—	—	—
1975–76	St. Paul Vulcans	MidJHL	47	16	58	74	148	—	—	—	—	—
1976–77	Michigan State University	WCHA	34	11	25	36	59	—	—	—	—	—
1977–78	Michigan State University	WCHA	2	0	0	0	0	—	—	—	—	—
1977–78	Maine Mariners	AHL	48	1	6	7	106	8	0	1	1	20
1977–78	Philadelphia Flyers	NHL	1	0	0	0	4	—	—	—	—	—
1978–79	Maine Mariners	AHL	78	8	16	24	223	10	2	4	6	10
1979–80	Cincinnati Stingers	CHL	5	0	1	1	5	—	—	—	—	—
1979–80	Maine Mariners	AHL	51	7	19	26	179	—	—	—	—	—
1979–80	Adirondack Red Wings	AHL	13	2	3	5	78	5	1	0	1	16
1980–81	Maine Mariners	AHL	44	3	5	8	144	—	—	—	—	—
1983–84	Toledo Goaldiggers	IHL	3	0	0	0	4	—	—	—	—	—
NHL totals			1	0	0	0	4	—	—	—	—	—

== See also ==
- List of players who played only one game in the NHL
