= Larry Hopkins (ice hockey) =

Canadian ice hockey player

- Born: March 17, 1954 (age 71); Oshawa, Ontario, Canada
- Height: 6 ft 1 in (185 cm)
- Weight: 210 lb (95 kg; 15 st 0 lb)
- Position: Left wing
- Shot: Left
- Played for: Toronto Maple Leafs; Winnipeg Jets
- NHL draft: 152nd overall, 1974; Atlanta Flames
- Playing career: 1978–1983

Larry Harold Hopkins (born March 17, 1954) was a Canadian ice hockey winger who played 60 games in the National Hockey League. He played with the Winnipeg Jets and Toronto Maple Leafs.

In 1982, O-Pee-Chee mistakenly put a picture of Hopkins on the rookie card of teammate Paul MacLean.

== Career statistics ==
=== Regular season and playoffs ===
			Regular season					Playoffs
Season	Team	League	GP	G	A	Pts	PIM	GP	G	A	Pts	PIM
1972–73	Oshawa Generals	OHA	50	5	17	22	9	—	—	—	—	—
1973–74	University of Toronto	CIAU	18	3	8	11	10	—	—	—	—	—
1974–75	University of Toronto	CIAU	20	1	4	5	2	—	—	—	—	—
1975–76	University of Toronto	CIAU	20	7	12	19	6	—	—	—	—	—
1976–77	University of Toronto	CIAU	20	12	20	32	10	—	—	—	—	—
1977–78	University of Toronto	CIAU	20	14	26	40	12	—	—	—	—	—
1977–78	Toronto Maple Leafs	NHL	2	0	0	0	0	—	—	—	—	—
1977–78	Dallas Black Hawks	CHL	—	—	—	—	—	11	0	1	1	7
1978–79	Saginaw Gears	IHL	80	36	41	77	67	4	1	0	1	7
1979–80	Winnipeg Jets	NHL	5	0	0	0	0	—	—	—	—	—
1979–80	Tulsa Oilers	CHL	72	29	31	60	33	3	0	0	0	0
1980–81	Tulsa Oilers	CHL	79	16	44	60	45	8	1	4	5	11
1981–82	Winnipeg Jets	NHL	41	10	15	25	22	4	0	0	0	2
1981–82	Tulsa Oilers	CHL	31	12	18	30	9	—	—	—	—	—
1982–83	Winnipeg Jets	NHL	12	3	1	4	4	2	0	0	0	0
1982–83	Sherbrooke Jets	AHL	66	18	30	48	42	—	—	—	—	—
NHL totals			60	13	16	29	26	6	0	0	0	2
