= Benoit Gosselin =

Canadian ice hockey player

- Born: July 19, 1957 (age 69) Montreal, Quebec, Canada
- Height: 5 ft 11 in (180 cm)
- Weight: 190 lb (86 kg; 13 st 8 lb)
- Position: Left wing
- Shot: Left
- Played for: New York Rangers; HC Caen
- NHL draft: 80th overall, 1977; New York Rangers
- WHA draft: 20th overall, 1977; Quebec Nordiques
- Playing career: 1977–1984

Benoit Gosselin (born July 19, 1957) is a Canadian former professional ice hockey left wing. He played seven games in the National Hockey League (NHL) with the New York Rangers during the 1977–78 season. He spent the rest of his career, which lasted from 1977 to 1984, mostly in the minor leagues.

== Junior career ==
Gosselin played four years in the Quebec Major Junior Hockey League. He started with the Shawinigan Cataractes in 1973–74, and moved to the Sorel Éperviers during the 1975–76 season. He split 1976–77, his final season in the QMJHL, between the Éperviers and the Trois-Rivières Draveurs.

In 1977 Gosselin was rated by The Hockey News draft preview issue as one of the QMJHL's top ten prospects.

== NHL career ==
Gosselin's NHL career lasted only seven games, with the New York Rangers in 1977–78; he did not record any points.

On September 25, 1979 he signed as an unrestricted free agent with the Winnipeg Jets, but played only for their minor league affiliates.

== Other leagues ==
Gosselin played in the American Hockey League for the New Haven Nighthawks and the Sherbrooke Jets; in the Central Hockey League for the Tulsa Oilers; and in the International Hockey League for Toledo, Kalamazoo, and Dayton. He also played for the Léopards de Caen in France.

== Career statistics ==
=== Regular season and playoffs ===
			Regular season					Playoffs
Season	Team	League	GP	G	A	Pts	PIM	GP	G	A	Pts	PIM
1973–74	Shawinigan Dynamos	QMJHL	64	12	17	29	134	4	1	3	4	9
1974–75	Shawinigan Dynamos	QMJHL	60	48	49	97	163	—	—	—	—	—
1975–76	Shawinigan Dynamos	QMJHL	20	16	12	28	30	—	—	—	—	—
1975–76	Sorel Éperviers	QMJHL	43	24	40	64	104	3	2	0	2	51
1976–77	Sorel Éperviers	QMJHL	41	35	22	57	89	—	—	—	—	—
1976–77	Trois-Rivières Draveurs	QMJHL	33	29	40	69	56	6	3	5	8	10
1977–78	New York Rangers	NHL	7	0	0	0	33	—	—	—	—	—
1977–78	New Haven Nighthawks	AHL	54	14	12	26	120	15	1	6	7	20
1978–79	New Haven Nighthawks	AHL	3	0	0	0	0	—	—	—	—	—
1978–79	Toledo Goaldiggers	IHL	8	5	3	8	18	—	—	—	—	—
1978–79	Kalamazoo Wings	IHL	65	35	24	59	81	15	8	6	14	60
1979–80	Dayton Gems	IHL	42	37	20	57	72	—	—	—	—	—
1979–80	Tulsa Oilers	CHL	37	21	15	36	24	3	0	0	0	11
1980–81	Tulsa Oilers	CHL	66	22	29	51	66	2	0	0	0	2
1981–82	Tulsa Oilers	CHL	71	31	23	54	29	—	—	—	—	—
1982–83	Sherbrooke Jets	AHL	21	5	2	7	6	—	—	—	—	—
1983–84	HC Caen	FRA	36	36	26	62	—	—	—	—	—	—
CHL totals			174	74	67	141	119	5	0	0	0	13
NHL totals			7	0	0	0	33	—	—	—	—	—
