= Dave Hoyda =

Canadian ice hockey player

- Born: May 20, 1957 Edmonton, Alberta, Canada
- Died: February 8, 2015 (aged 57) Tulsa, Oklahoma, U.S.
- Height: 6 ft 1 in (185 cm)
- Weight: 205 lb (93 kg; 14 st 9 lb)
- Position: Left wing
- Shot: Left
- Played for: Philadelphia Flyers; Winnipeg Jets
- NHL draft: 53rd overall, 1977; Philadelphia Flyers
- WHA draft: 60th overall, 1977; Edmonton Oilers
- Playing career: 1977–1981

David Allan Hoyda (May 20, 1957 – February 8, 2015) was a Canadian professional ice hockey player. Hoyda played four seasons in the National Hockey League (NHL) with the Philadelphia Flyers and Winnipeg Jets. He was known primarily as an enforcer.

Hoyda was raised in Cherhill, Alberta, and later attended St. Francis Xavier High School in Edmonton while he played Canadian Junior "A" hockey with the Spruce Grove Mets. Hoyda and the Mets won the 1975 Canadian Junior "A" national championship. He moved up to Major Junior hockey for his next two seasons, playing with the Edmonton Oil Kings/Portland Winterhawks (franchise moved).

Hoyda was drafted in both the World Hockey Association and NHL Amateur Drafts in 1977, signing a contract with the NHL's Philadelphia Flyers.

Hoyda died in 2015.

== Career statistics ==
=== Regular season and playoffs ===
			Regular season					Playoffs
Season	Team	League	GP	G	A	Pts	PIM	GP	G	A	Pts	PIM
1973–74	Edmonton Mets	AJHL	28	0	1	1	56	—	—	—	—	—
1974–75	Spruce Grove Mets	AJHL	59	25	31	56	141	12	7	6	13	42
1974–75	Edmonton Oil Kings	WCHL	1	0	0	0	0	—	—	—	—	—
1975–76	Edmonton Oil Kings	WCHL	43	5	18	23	170	5	0	1	1	23
1975–76	Spruce Grove Mets	AJHL	4	3	3	6	37	—	—	—	—	—
1976–77	Portland Winterhawks	WCHL	61	16	26	42	220	10	7	2	9	22
1977–78	Philadelphia Flyers	NHL	41	1	3	4	119	9	0	0	0	17
1977–78	Maine Mariners	AHL	31	4	5	9	112	—	—	—	—	—
1978–79	Philadelphia Flyers	NHL	67	3	13	16	138	3	0	0	0	0
1979–80	Winnipeg Jets	NHL	15	1	1	2	35	—	—	—	—	—
1979–80	Tulsa Oilers	CHL	32	11	6	17	89	—	—	—	—	—
1980–81	Winnipeg Jets	NHL	9	1	0	1	7	—	—	—	—	—
1980–81	Tulsa Oilers	CHL	42	13	22	35	118	—	—	—	—	—
NHL totals			132	6	17	23	299	12	0	0	0	17
