= Kurt Walker (ice hockey) =

American ice hockey player (1954–2018)

- Born: June 10, 1954 Weymouth, Massachusetts, U.S.
- Died: August 17, 2018 (aged 64) Atlanta, Georgia, U.S.
- Height: 6 ft 3 in (191 cm)
- Weight: 185 lb (84 kg; 13 st 3 lb)
- Position: Right wing
- Shot: Left
- Played for: Toronto Maple Leafs
- NHL draft: Undrafted
- Playing career: 1974–1980

Kurt Walker (June 10, 1954 – August 17, 2018) was an American professional ice hockey player who played 71 games in the National Hockey League (NHL) for the Toronto Maple Leafs between 1976 and 1978.

== Career ==
Walker started his professional career with the Saginaw Gears, of the International Hockey League, in the 1974–75 IHL season.

Walker played 71 NHL games, over parts of the 1975–76 through 1977–78 NHL seasons, all with the Toronto Maple Leafs. He scored his first career NHL goal against the Vancouver Canucks on January 21, 1977. Walker scored 9 points in the NHL and accrued 152 penalty minutes.

He closed out his professional career with the Adirondack Red Wings of the American Hockey League in the 1979–80 AHL season.

=== Post–playing career ===
Playing as an enforcer throughout his hockey career, Walker required 17 surgeries to repair injuries. He criticized the NHL Alumni organization, which he claimed did not support retired players enough financially. As a result, he created an organization called Dignity after Hockey to raise awareness and funds to provide health care to retired players. In 2017, he added his name to a class-action lawsuit against the NHL alleging neglect of support for players suffering injuries and financial strain once retired.

== Death ==
Walker died in Atlanta, Georgia, on August 17, 2018, from sepsis.

== Career statistics ==
=== Regular season and playoffs ===
			Regular season					Playoffs
Season	Team	League	GP	G	A	Pts	PIM	GP	G	A	Pts	PIM
1971–72	Hingham High School	HS-MA	—	—	—	—	—	—	—	—	—	—
1972–73	Northeastern University	ECAC	—	—	—	—	—	—	—	—	—	—
1973–74	Sherbrooke Castors	QMJHL	36	2	5	7	142	—	—	—	—	—
1974–75	Saginaw Gears	IHL	67	1	3	4	168	16	0	0	0	0
1975–76	Toronto Maple Leafs	NHL	5	0	0	0	49	6	0	0	0	24
1975–76	Oklahoma City Blazers	CHL	59	4	5	9	184	—	—	—	—	—
1976–77	Toronto Maple Leafs	NHL	26	2	3	5	34	—	—	—	—	—
1976–77	Dallas Black Hawks	CHL	6	3	0	3	50	—	—	—	—	—
1977–78	Toronto Maple Leafs	NHL	40	2	2	4	69	10	0	0	0	10
1977–78	Dallas Black Hawks	CHL	20	3	3	6	53	2	1	0	1	2
1978–79	Springfield Indians	AHL	11	0	1	1	22	—	—	—	—	—
1978–79	Tulsa Oilers	CHL	54	17	19	36	81	—	—	—	—	—
1979–80	Binghamton Dusters	AHL	6	0	0	0	4	—	—	—	—	—
1979–80	Syracuse Firebirds	AHL	11	1	4	5	18	—	—	—	—	—
NHL totals			71	4	5	9	152	16	0	0	0	34
