= 1977–78 New York Rangers season =

NHL hockey team season

1977–78 New York Rangers
- Division: 4th Patrick
- Conference: 5th Campbell
- 1977–78 record: 30–37–13
- Home record: 18–15–7
- Road record: 12–22–6
- Goals for: 279
- Goals against: 280

Team information
- General manager: John Ferguson
- Coach: Jean-Guy Talbot
- Captain: Phil Esposito
- Alternate captains: None
- Arena: Madison Square Garden

Team leaders
- Goals: Pat Hickey (40)
- Assists: Ron Greschner (48)
- Points: Phil Esposito (81)
- Penalty minutes: Carol Vadnais (115)
- Wins: John Davidson (14)
- Goals against average: John Davidson (3.18)

The 1977–78 New York Rangers season was the franchise's 52nd season. The Rangers slipped to last in the Patrick but qualified for the playoffs by having one of the top twelve records in the league. The Rangers lost in the first round of the playoffs.

== Offseason ==
The Rangers hired Jean-Guy Talbot as their new head coach. It would be his only season as head coach of the Rangers.

== Regular season ==
=== Season standings ===
Patrick Division
	GP	W	L	T	GF	GA	Pts
**New York Islanders**	80	48	17	15	334	210	111
**Philadelphia Flyers**	80	45	20	15	296	200	105
**Atlanta Flames**	80	34	27	19	274	252	87
**New York Rangers**	80	30	37	13	279	280	73

Note: GP = Games played, W = Wins, L = Losses, T = Ties, Pts = Points, GF = Goals for, GA = Goals against
Note: Teams that qualified for the playoffs are highlighted in bold.

=== Record vs. opponents ===
Patrick Division record vs. opponents

**Vs. Campbell Conference**

**Vs. Wales Conference**

**Vs. Patrick Division**

1977–78 NHL records
Team	**ATL**	**NYI**	**NYR**	**PHI**	**Total**
Atlanta	—	1–2–3	6–0	1–4–1	**8–6–4**
N.Y. Islanders	2–1–3	—	4–2	2–1–3	**8–4–6**
N.Y. Rangers	0–6	2–4	—	0–4–2	**2–14–2**
Philadelphia	4–1–1	1–2–3	4–0–2	—	**9–3–6**

**Vs. Smythe Division**

1977–78 NHL records
Team	**CHI**	**COL**	**MIN**	**STL**	**VAN**	**Total**
Atlanta	1–2–2	2–1–2	4–1	4–0–1	2–1–2	**13–5–7**
N.Y. Islanders	2–1–2	4–0–1	4–1	4–0–1	5–0	**19–2–4**
N.Y. Rangers	3–1–1	2–2–1	3–0–2	4–0–1	4–1	**16–4–5**
Philadelphia	2–2–1	3–2	3–2	4–1	5–0	**17–7–1**

**Vs. Adams Division**

1977–78 NHL records
Team	**BOS**	**BUF**	**CLE**	**TOR**	**Total**
Atlanta	1–2–1	1–2–1	2–1–1	3–2	**7–7–3**
N.Y. Islanders	3–1	2–3	1–1–2	3–1	**9–6–2**
N.Y. Rangers	1–4	1–2–1	3–1	1–3	**6–10–1**
Philadelphia	2–1–1	0–3–1	4–0–1	1–3	**7–7–3**

**Vs. Norris Division**

1977–78 NHL records
Team	**DET**	**LAK**	**MTL**	**PIT**	**WSH**	**Total**
Atlanta	1–2–1	1–2–1	0–2–2	3–1	1–2–1	**6–9–5**
N.Y. Islanders	4–0	2–0–2	0–4	2–1–1	4–0	**12–5–3**
N.Y. Rangers	2–1–1	1–3	1–3	0–2–2	2–0–2	**6–9–5**
Philadelphia	2–1–1	3–0–1	0–2–2	3–0–1	4–0	**12–3–5**

== Schedule and results ==
1977–78 regular season
October: 4–5–1 (home: 3–2–1; road: 1–3–0)

Game	October	Opponent	Score	Record
1	12	Vancouver Canucks	6–3	1–0–0
2	15	@ Montreal Canadiens	5–0	1–1–0
3	16	New York Islanders	4–2	2–1–0
4	19	Pittsburgh Penguins	3–3	2–1–1
5	22	@ New York Islanders	7–2	2–2–1
6	23	Montreal Canadiens	6–2	2–3–1
7	25	@ Cleveland Barons	5–0	3–3–1
8	26	St. Louis Blues	6–2	4–3–1
9	29	@ Atlanta Flames	4–3	4–4–1
10	30	Los Angeles Kings	5–3	4–5–1

November: 5–7–1 (home: 3–2–0; road: 2–5–1)

Game	November	Opponent	Score	Record
11	2	@ Colorado Rockies	6–2	4–6–1
12	4	@ Vancouver Canucks	5–1	5–6–1
13	5	@ Los Angeles Kings	3–1	5–7–1
14	9	Buffalo Sabres	8–4	6–7–1
15	12	@ Detroit Red Wings	3–1	6–8–1
16	13	Atlanta Flames	5–2	6–9–1
17	16	Chicago Black Hawks	5–2	7–9–1
18	19	@ Pittsburgh Penguins	5–5	7–9–2
19	20	Vancouver Canucks	3–0	7–10–2
20	23	Colorado Rockies	6–3	8–10–2
21	26	@ Boston Bruins	3–2	8–11–2
22	27	@ Buffalo Sabres	3–2	8–12–2
23	30	@ St. Louis Blues	4–0	9–12–2

December: 3–4–7 (home: 2–2–4; road: 1–2–3)

Game	December	Opponent	Score	Record
24	3	@ Minnesota North Stars	4–0	10–12–2
25	4	Minnesota North Stars	4–4	10–12–3
26	7	Philadelphia Flyers	3–3	10–12–4
27	8	@ Philadelphia Flyers	7–4	10–13–4
28	11	Boston Bruins	8–2	10–14–4
29	14	@ Chicago Black Hawks	2–2	10–14–5
30	15	@ Detroit Red Wings	5–5	10–14–6
31	17	@ Cleveland Barons	4–2	10–15–6
32	18	Detroit Red Wings	6–2	11–15–6
33	21	Washington Capitals	5–5	11–15–7
34	23	Cleveland Barons	5–4	12–15–7
35	28	Philadelphia Flyers	4–3	12–16–7
36	30	@ Washington Capitals	3–3	12–16–8
37	31	Buffalo Sabres	2–2	12–16–9

January: 4–8–0 (home: 0–3–0; road: 4–5–0)

Game	January	Opponent	Score	Record
38	4	@ Minnesota North Stars	5–3	13–16–9
39	7	@ Colorado Rockies	3–1	13–17–9
40	9	Pittsburgh Penguins	5–3	13–18–9
41	10	@ Boston Bruins	3–2	14–18–9
42	14	@ Philadelphia Flyers	4–1	14–19–9
43	17	@ Vancouver Canucks	5–4	15–19–9
44	18	@ Los Angeles Kings	3–0	16–19–9
45	20	@ Atlanta Flames	5–3	16–20–9
46	22	@ Pittsburgh Penguins	3–1	16–21–9
47	25	Toronto Maple Leafs	4–3	16–22–9
48	28	@ New York Islanders	6–2	16–23–9
49	29	Los Angeles Kings	4–1	16–24–9

February: 5–6–2 (home: 4–3–1; road: 1–3–1)

Game	February	Opponent	Score	Record
50	1	New York Islanders	7–6	16–25–9
51	4	@ St. Louis Blues	2–2	16–25–10
52	5	Colorado Rockies	6–3	17–25–10
53	8	Minnesota North Stars	3–0	18–25–10
54	9	@ Buffalo Sabres	2–0	18–26–10
55	11	@ Toronto Maple Leafs	3–2	18–27–10
56	12	Montreal Canadiens	5–3	18–28–10
57	15	Vancouver Canucks	6–3	19–28–10
58	19	Colorado Rockies	4–4	19–28–11
59	22	@ Chicago Black Hawks	3–2	19–29–11
60	23	Chicago Black Hawks	6–2	20–29–11
61	25	@ Montreal Canadiens	6–3	21–29–11
62	27	Atlanta Flames	5–3	21–30–11

March: 8–2–2 (home: 5–2–1; road: 3–0–1)

Game	March	Opponent	Score	Record
63	1	Detroit Red Wings	3–2	22–30–11
64	5	Toronto Maple Leafs	4–1	22–31–11
65	8	Cleveland Barons	6–1	23–31–11
66	12	Washington Capitals	8–2	24–31–11
67	15	Philadelphia Flyers	2–2	24–31–12
68	18	Boston Bruins	6–3	24–32–12
69	19	@ Minnesota North Stars	7–7	24–32–13
70	22	@ St. Louis Blues	6–1	25–32–13
71	24	@ Washington Capitals	11–4	26–32–13
72	25	@ Toronto Maple Leafs	5–2	27–32–13
73	27	St. Louis Blues	5–2	28–32–13
74	29	New York Islanders	5–1	29–32–13

April: 1–5–0 (home: 1–1–0; road: 0–4–0)

Game	April	Opponent	Score	Record
75	1	@ Atlanta Flames	6–0	29–33–13
76	2	@ Boston Bruins	8–3	29–34–13
77	5	Atlanta Flames	4–2	29–35–13
78	6	@ Philadelphia Flyers	3–0	29–36–13
79	8	@ New York Islanders	7–2	29–37–13
80	9	Chicago Black Hawks	3–2	30–37–13

Legend: Win (2 points) Loss (0 points) Tie (1 point)

== Playoffs ==
1978 Stanley Cup playoffs
Preliminary round vs. (5) Buffalo Sabres – Sabres win 2–1

Game	Date	Visitor	Score	Home	OT	Series
1	April 11	New York Rangers	1–4	Buffalo Sabres		Buffalo leads series 1–0
2	April 13	Buffalo Sabres	3–4	New York Rangers	OT	Series tied 1–1
3	April 15	New York Rangers	1–4	Buffalo Sabres		Buffalo wins series 2–1

Legend: Win Loss

== Player statistics ==
Skaters

Regular season
Player	GP	G	A	Pts	PIM
Phil Esposito	79	38	43	81	53
Pat Hickey	80	40	33	73	47
Ron Greschner	78	24	48	72	100
Walt Tkaczuk	80	26	40	66	30
Steve Vickers	79	19	44	63	30
Don Murdoch	66	27	28	55	41
Carol Vadnais	80	6	40	46	115
Ron Duguay	71	20	20	40	43
Lucien DeBlois	71	22	8	30	27
Ed Johnstone	53	13	13	26	44
Greg Polis	37	7	16	23	12
Dave Maloney	56	2	19	21	63
Mike McEwen	57	5	13	18	52
Wayne Dillon	59	5	13	18	15
Dan Newman	59	5	13	18	22
Mark Heaslip	29	5	10	15	34
Don Awrey	78	2	8	10	38
Rod Gilbert	19	2	7	9	6
Nick Fotiu	59	2	7	9	105
Dave Farrish	66	3	5	8	62
Ken Hodge	18	2	4	6	8
Dallas Smith	29	1	4	5	23
Jerry Byers	7	2	1	3	0
Mario Marois	8	1	1	2	15
Bill Goldsworthy	7	0	1	1	12
Mike Keating	1	0	0	0	0
Bud Stefanski	1	0	0	0	0
Greg Hickey	1	0	0	0	0
Greg Holst	4	0	0	0	0
Benoit Gosselin	7	0	0	0	33

Playoffs
Player	GP	G	A	Pts	PIM
Don Murdoch	3	1	3	4	4
Steve Vickers	3	2	1	3	0
Ron Duguay	3	1	1	2	2
Carol Vadnais	3	0	2	2	16
Walt Tkaczuk	3	0	2	2	0
Pat Hickey	3	2	0	2	0
Dallas Smith	1	0	1	1	0
Wayne Dillon	3	0	1	1	0
Phil Esposito	3	0	1	1	5
Mario Marois	1	0	0	0	5
Dave Farrish	3	0	0	0	0
Nick Fotiu	3	0	0	0	5
Don Awrey	3	0	0	0	6
Mark Heaslip	3	0	0	0	0
Dan Newman	3	0	0	0	4
Dave Maloney	3	0	0	0	11
Lucien DeBlois	3	0	0	0	2
Ron Greschner	3	0	0	0	2

Goaltenders

Regular season
Player	GP	TOI	W	L	T	GA	GAA	SO
Wayne Thomas	41	2352	12	20	7	141	3.60	4
John Davidson	34	1848	14	13	4	98	3.18	1
Doug Soetaert	6	360	2	2	2	20	3.33	0
Hardy Astrom	4	240	2	2	0	14	3.50	0

Playoffs
Player	GP	TOI	W	L	GA	GAA	SO
John Davidson	2	122	1	1	7	3.44	0
Wayne Thomas	1	60	0	1	4	4.00	0

^{†}Denotes player spent time with another team before joining Rangers. Stats reflect time with Rangers only.
^{‡}Traded mid-season. Stats reflect time with Rangers only.

Note:

Pos = Position;GP = Games played; G = Goals; A = Assists; Pts = Points; PIM = Penalty minutes; +/- = Plus/minus; PPG = Power-play goals; SHG = Short-handed goals; GWG = Game-winning goals
Pos = Position;GP = Games played; Min, TOI = Minutes played; W = Wins; L = Losses; T,T/OT = Ties; OTL = Overtime losses; GA = Goals-against; GAA = Goals-against average; SO = Shutouts; SA = Shots against; SV = Shots saved;SV% = Save percentage;

== Awards and records ==
- Phil Esposito, Lester Patrick Trophy

== Draft picks ==
New York's picks at the 1977 NHL amateur draft in Montreal, Canada.

Round	#	Player	Position	Nationality	College/Junior/Club team (League)
1	8	Lucien DeBlois	RW	Canada	Sorel Black Hawks (QMJHL)
1	13	Ron Duguay	C	Canada	Sudbury Wolves (OHA)
2	26	Mike Keating	LW	Canada	St. Catharines Fincups (OHA)
3	44	Steve Baker	G	United States	Union College (NCAA)
4	62	Mario Marois	D	Canada	Quebec Remparts (QMJHL)
5	80	Benoit Gosselin	LW	Canada	Trois-Rivières Draveurs (QMJHL)
6	98	John Bethel	LW	Canada	Boston University (NCAA)
7	116	Bob Sullivan	LW	Canada	Chicoutimi Saguenéens (QMJHL)
8	131	Lance Nethery	C	Canada	Cornell University (NCAA)
9	146	Alex Jeans	C	Canada	University of Toronto (CIAU)
10	157	Pete Raps	LW	Canada	Western Michigan University (NCAA)
11	164	Mike Brown	RW	United States	Western Michigan University (NCAA)
12	171	Mark Miller	LW	Canada	University of Michigan (NCAA)

== See also ==
- 1977–78 NHL season
