= Fair (surname) =

Fair is an English, Danish, German, and Jewish surname. The name may have derived from the Old Norse word fær meaning 'capable' or the Old German word fæger meaning 'the fair and beautiful one'. The name may refer to:

== People ==
- Aubrey Fair (1881–1954), English footballer
- Brian Fair (born 1975), American singer
- Bryan Fair (born 1960), American legal scholar
- C. Christine Fair (born 1968), American professor of political science
- C. J. Fair (born 1991), American basketball player
- Campbell Fair (born 2000), Canadian football player
- Charles M. Fair (1916–2014), American neuroscientist
- Charnette Fair (born 1979), American volleyball player
- Damien Fair, American neuroscientist
- David Fair (born 1952), American activist
- Dick Fair (1907–1982), Australian actor
- Dyaisha Fair (born 2001), American basketball player
- Elinor Fair (1903–1957), American actress
- Elizabeth Fair (1908–1997), English novelist
- George Fair (1856–1939), American Major League baseball player
- J Henry Fair, American photographer and environmentalist
- Jad Fair (born 1954), American singer
- James Fair (field hockey) (born 1981), English field hockey player
- James Graham Fair (1831–1894), Irish-American mining engineer
- James R. Fair (1920–2010), American chemical engineer
- Jamie Fair (born 1945), American politician
- Jeff Fair (born 1947), American football trainer
- Jonny Fair, American musician
- Joseph Fair, American virologist
- Keith Fair (born 1968), Canadian-born Swiss ice hockey player
- Kevin Fair, Canadian TV and film director
- Laura Fair (1837–1919), American murderer
- Lex Fair (1926–1995), Irish religious leader
- Lorrie Fair (born 1978), American professional soccer midfielder
- Martin Fair (born 1964), Scottish religious leader
- Michael Fair (born 1982), Canadian tattoo artist
- Mike Fair (South Carolina politician) (born 1946), American politician
- Mike Fair (Oklahoma politician) (1942–2022), American politician
- Ray Fair (born 1942), American professor of economics
- Robert Fair (Canadian politician) (1891–1954), Canadian politician
- Robert James Fair (1919–2002), American politician
- Robert Leahy Fair (1923–1983), American military leader
- Ron Fair, American record producer
- Ronald Fair (1932–2018), American writer and sculptor
- Ronnie Fair (born 1978), American soccer player
- Terry Fair (born 1976), American football player and coach
- Terry Fair (basketball) (1960–2020), American-Israeli professional basketball player
- Vic Fair (1938–2017), English poster artist
- W. B. Fair (1850–1909), English music hall performer
- Woody Fair (1914–2000), American baseball player
- Yvonne Fair (1942–1994), American singer
- Zora Fair (died 1865), American Confederate spy

== Fictional characters ==
- Seymore D. Fair, the mascot of the 1984 Louisiana World Exposition
- Zack Fair, a character from the video game Final Fantasy VII

== See also ==
- Fair (band)
- List of people known as the Fair
- Fairs (surname)
