= 1977–78 Cleveland Barons season =

NHL season

1977–78 Cleveland Barons
- Division: 4th Adams
- Conference: 8th Wales
- 1977–78 record: 22–45–13
- Home record: 14–17–9
- Road record: 8–28–4
- Goals for: 230
- Goals against: 325

Team information
- General manager: Harry Howell
- Coach: Jack Evans
- Captain: Jim Neilson and Bob Stewart
- Alternate captains: None
- Arena: Coliseum at Richfield

Team leaders
- Goals: Dennis Maruk (36)
- Assists: Dennis Maruk (35)
- Points: Dennis Maruk (71)
- Penalty minutes: Randy Holt (229)
- Plus/minus: Reg Kerr, Jeff Allan (0)
- Wins: Gilles Meloche (16)
- Goals against average: Gilles Meloche (3.77)

The 1977–78 Cleveland Barons season was the team's 11th and final season in the NHL. The relocation to Cleveland did not cure the attendance problems that plagued the franchise from its inception in Oakland as the Seals in 1967. In June 1978, with both the Barons and the Minnesota North Stars on the verge of folding, the league approved an arrangement in which the two teams were permitted to merge under the ownership of Barons owner George Gund III. The merged franchise continued as the Minnesota North Stars, and assumed the Barons' old place in the Adams Division. Fifteen seasons later, the North Stars relocated to Dallas and became the Stars, bringing the NHL to Texas for the first time. The NHL returned to both the Buckeye State and the North Star State when the Columbus Blue Jackets and Minnesota Wild both began play in 2000.

== Offseason ==
=== Amateur draft ===
Cleveland's picks at the 1977 NHL amateur draft, which was held at the NHL's office in Montreal on June 14, 1977.

Players drafted by the Cleveland Barons in 1977 and their NHL career regular season statistics
Round	Pick	Player	Position	Nationality	Team (league)	GP	G	A	Pts	PIM	W	L	T	GAA
1	5	Mike Crombeen	Forward	Canada	Kingston Canadians (OMJHL)	475	55	68	123	218	—	—	—	—
2	23	Dan Chicoine	Right wing	Canada	Sherbrooke Beavers (QMJHL)	31	1	2	3	12	—	—	—	—
3	41	Reg Kerr	Defense	Canada	Kamloops Chiefs (WHL)	263	66	94	160	169	—	—	—	—
3	42	Guy Lash	Right wing	Canada	Winnipeg Monarchs (WCHL)	—	—	—	—	—	—	—	—	—
4	59	John Baby	Defense	Canada	Sudbury Wolves (OMJHL)	26	2	8	10	26	—	—	—	—
5	77	Owen Lloyd	Defense	Canada	Medicine Hat Tigers (WCHL)	—	—	—	—	—	—	—	—	—
6	95	Jeff Allan	Defense	Canada	Hull Olympiques (QMJHL)	4	0	0	0	2	—	—	—	—
7	113	Mark Toffolo	Defense	United States	Chicoutimi Saguenéens (QMJHL)	—	—	—	—	—	—	—	—	—
8	128	Grant Eakin	Left wing	Canada	Lethbridge Broncos (WCHL)	—	—	—	—	—	—	—	—	—

== Regular season ==
On December 11, 1977, Tom Bladon of the Philadelphia Flyers became the first defenseman in NHL history to score 8 points in one game. He scored four goals and four assists versus the Cleveland Barons. It was 25% of his point total for the entire season.

The Barons did not qualify for the playoffs.

=== Final standings ===
Adams Division
	GP	W	L	T	GF	GA	Pts
**Boston Bruins**	80	51	18	11	333	218	113
**Buffalo Sabres**	80	44	19	17	288	215	105
**Toronto Maple Leafs**	80	41	29	10	271	237	92
Cleveland Barons	80	22	45	13	230	325	57

Note: GP = Games played, W = Wins, L = Losses, T = Ties, Pts = Points, GF = Goals for, GA = Goals against
Note: Teams that qualified for the playoffs are highlighted in bold.

=== Record vs. opponents ===
Adams Division record vs. opponents

**Vs. Wales Conference**

**Vs. Campbell Conference**

**Vs. Adams Division**

1977–78 NHL records
Team	**BOS**	**BUF**	**CLE**	**TOR**	**Total**
Boston	—	2–4	3–1–2	5–0–1	**10–5–3**
Buffalo	4–2	—	4–2	2–3–1	**10–7–1**
Cleveland	1–3–2	2–4	—	2–4	**5–13–2**
Toronto	0–5–1	3–2–1	4–2	—	**7–9–2**

**Vs. Norris Division**

1977–78 NHL records
Team	**DET**	**LAK**	**MTL**	**PIT**	**WSH**	**Total**
Boston	4–0–1	5–0	0–4–1	5–0	4–0–1	**18–4–3**
Buffalo	2–2–1	3–0–2	3–2	0–0–5	3–1–1	**11–5–9**
Cleveland	2–2–1	1–3–1	1–4	0–5	2–3	**6–17–2**
Toronto	2–1–2	2–3	0–4–1	2–3	4–0–1	**10–11–4**

**Vs. Patrick Division**

1977–78 NHL records
Team	**ATL**	**NYI**	**NYR**	**PHI**	**Total**
Boston	2–1–1	1–3	4–1	1–2–1	**8–7–2**
Buffalo	2–1–1	3–2	2–1–1	3–0–1	**10–4–3**
Cleveland	1–2–1	1–1–2	1–3	0–4–1	**3–10–4**
Toronto	2–3	1–3	3–1	3–1	**9–8–0**

**Vs. Smythe Division**

1977–78 NHL records
Team	**CHI**	**COL**	**MIN**	**STL**	**VAN**	**Total**
Boston	3–1	3–0–1	3–1	4–0	2–0–2	**15–2–3**
Buffalo	2–1–1	3–1	3–1	4–0	1–0–3	**13–3–4**
Cleveland	1–3	1–1–2	3–0–1	1–2–1	2–1–1	**8–7–5**
Toronto	2–1–1	4–0	4–0	2–0–2	3–0–1	**15–1–4**

== Schedule and results ==
=== Regular season ===
1977–78 regular season
October: 4–5–0 (home: 2–3–0; road: 2–2–0)

Game	Date	Opponent	Score	Decision	Arena	Attendance	Record	Pts	Recap
1	October 12, 1977	@ Los Angeles	0–2	Meloche	The Forum	11,643	0–1–0	0	
2	October 15, 1977	Washington	4–2	Meloche	Coliseum at Richfield	10,253	1–1–0	2	
3	October 19, 1977	Los Angeles	3–1	Meloche	Coliseum at Richfield	3,252	2–1–0	4	
4	October 20, 1977	@ Minnesota	7–4	Meloche	Met Center	7,270	3–1–0	6	
5	October 22, 1977	@ St. Louis	3–2	Meloche	The Checkerdome	10,644	4–1–0	8	
6	October 23, 1977	Pittsburgh	2–3	Meloche	Coliseum at Richfield	5,910	4–2–0	8	
7	October 25, 1977	N.Y. Rangers	0–5	Meloche	Coliseum at Richfield	4,556	4–3–0	8	
8	October 28, 1977	Chicago	2–4	Meloche	Coliseum at Richfield	6,273	4–4–0	8	
9	October 30, 1977	@ Chicago	1–6	Meloche	Chicago Stadium	10,505	4–5–0	8	

November: 3–8–2 (home: 2–2–1; road: 1–6–1)

Game	Date	Opponent	Score	Decision	Arena	Attendance	Record	Pts	Recap
10	November 2, 1977	St. Louis	4–4	Edwards	Coliseum at Richfield	4,641	4–5–1	9	
11	November 5, 1977	@ Detroit	4–3	Meloche	Detroit Olympia	13,185	5–5–1	11	
12	November 6, 1977	Detroit	1–4	Edwards	Coliseum at Richfield	6,687	5–6–1	11	
13	November 9, 1977	@ Pittsburgh	3–5	Meloche	Civic Arena	7,516	5–7–1	11	
14	November 13, 1977	@ Boston	1–3	Edwards	Boston Garden	10,234	5–8–1	11	
15	November 15, 1977	@ Vancouver	4–5	Meloche	Pacific Coliseum	13,500	5–9–1	11	
16	November 16, 1977	@ Los Angeles	1–1	Edwards	The Forum	10,649	5–9–2	12	
17	November 19, 1977	@ Colorado	2–7	Meloche	McNichols Sports Arena	5,114	5–10–2	12	
18	November 23, 1977	Montreal	2–1	Edwards	Coliseum at Richfield	12,859	6–10–2	14	
19	November 25, 1977	@ Philadelphia	2–7	Edwards	Spectrum	17,077	6–11–2	14	
20	November 26, 1977	St. Louis	1–2	Meloche	Coliseum at Richfield	4,497	6–12–2	14	
21	November 29, 1977	@ Toronto	2–3	Edwards	Maple Leaf Gardens	16,485	6–13–2	14	
22	November 30, 1977	Toronto	5–3	Meloche	Coliseum at Richfield	3,930	7–13–2	16	

December: 3–10–2 (home: 1–4–2; road: 2–6–0)

Game	Date	Opponent	Score	Decision	Arena	Attendance	Record	Pts	Recap
23	December 2, 1977	@ Washington	3–2	Edwards	Capital Centre	12,371	8–13–2	18	
24	December 3, 1977	Boston	4–4	Meloche	Coliseum at Richfield	6,636	8–13–3	19	
25	December 7, 1977	Washington	3–5	Edwards	Coliseum at Richfield	3,842	8–14–3	19	
26	December 8, 1977	@ Buffalo	2–5	Edwards	Buffalo Memorial Auditorium	16,433	8–15–3	19	
27	December 11, 1977	@ Philadelphia	1–11	Edwards	Spectrum	17,077	8–16–3	19	
28	December 12, 1977	Montreal	1–5	Meloche	Coliseum at Richfield	5,026	8–17–3	19	
29	December 15, 1977	@ Atlanta	6–3	Edwards	The Omni	7,829	9–17–3	21	
30	December 17, 1977	N.Y. Rangers	4–2	Meloche	Coliseum at Richfield	4,929	10–17–3	23	
31	December 18, 1977	@ Boston	1–2	Edwards	Boston Garden	11,255	10–18–3	23	
32	December 21, 1977	Philadelphia	0–4	Meloche	Coliseum at Richfield	5,112	10–19–3	23	
33	December 23, 1977	@ N.Y. Rangers	4–5	Edwards	Madison Square Garden	17,500	10–20–3	23	
34	December 27, 1977	@ Montreal	3–5	Meloche	Montreal Forum	15,730	10–21–3	23	
35	December 28, 1977	Boston	5–5	Edwards	Coliseum at Richfield	11,255	10–21–4	24	
36	December 30, 1977	Toronto	0–5	Meloche	Coliseum at Richfield	6,520	10–22–4	24	
37	December 31, 1977	@ Pittsburgh	3–6	Edwards	Civic Arena	7,237	10–23–4	24	

January: 7–7–0 (home: 5–1–0; road: 2–6–0)

Game	Date	Opponent	Score	Decision	Arena	Attendance	Record	Pts	Recap
38	January 3, 1978	@ Philadelphia	4–5	Meloche	Spectrum	17,077	10–23–4	24	
39	January 6, 1978	Vancouver	6–1	Meloche	Coliseum at Richfield	5,037	11–24–4	26	
40	January 7, 1978	@ N.Y. Islanders	3–5	Meloche	Nassau Veterans Memorial Coliseum	15,317	11–25–4	26	
41	January 11, 1978	N.Y. Islanders	5–3	Meloche	Coliseum at Richfield	2,704	12–25–4	28	
42	January 12, 1978	Buffalo	6–3	Edwards	Coliseum at Richfield	2,110	13–25–4	30	
43	January 13, 1978	Toronto	5–2	Edwards	Coliseum at Richfield	4,527	14–25–4	32	
44	January 14, 1978	@ Pittsburgh	2–4	Meloche	Civic Arena	11,461	14–25–4	32	
45	January 18, 1978	Montreal	4–7	Edwards	Coliseum at Richfield	7,011	14–27–4	32	
46	January 19, 1978	@ Buffalo	2–9	Meloche	Buffalo Memorial Auditorium	16,433	14–28–4	32	
47	January 21, 1978	Colorado	9–4	Meloche	Coliseum at Richfield	5,226	15–28–4	34	
48	January 22, 1978	@ Boston	3–2	Edwards	Boston Garden	11,427	16–28–4	36	
49	January 26, 1978	@ Chicago	0–5	Edwards	Chicago Stadium	537	16–29–4	36	
50	January 28, 1978	@ Minnesota	2–1	Meloche	Met Center	8,958	17–29–4	38	
51	January 29, 1978	Atlanta	2–6	Edwards	Coliseum at Richfield	3,321	17–30–4	38	

February: 2–7–4 (home: 2–3–3; road: 0–4–1)

Game	Date	Opponent	Score	Decision	Arena	Attendance	Record	Pts	Recap
52	February 1, 1978	Detroit	2–0	Meloche	Coliseum at Richfield	7,841	18–30–4	40	
53	February 4, 1978	Philadelphia	2–2	Meloche	Coliseum at Richfield	13,110	18–30–5	41	
54	February 5, 1978	@ Detroit	3–4	Meloche	Detroit Olympia	10,216	18–31–5	41	
55	February 8, 1978	Buffalo	2–5	Meloche	Coliseum at Richfield	4,094	18–32–5	41	
56	February 10, 1978	Washington	1–4	Meloche	Coliseum at Richfield	4,193	18–33–5	41	
57	February 12, 1978	N.Y. Islanders	2–2	Meloche	Coliseum at Richfield	6,440	18–33–6	42	
58	February 15, 1978	Atlanta	5–5	Meloche	Coliseum at Richfield	2,696	18–33–7	43	
59	February 17, 1978	Vancouver	3–2	Meloche	Coliseum at Richfield	4,589	19–33–7	45	
60	February 22, 1978	@ Toronto	3–5	Edwards	Maple Leaf Gardens	16,449	19–34–7	45	
61	February 23, 1978	@ Montreal	1–5	Meloche	Montreal Forum	15,615	19–35–7	45	
62	February 25, 1978	Buffalo	3–13	Meloche	Coliseum at Richfield	10,324	19–36–7	45	
63	February 27, 1978	@ Vancouver	3–3	Edwards	Pacific Coliseum		19–36–8	46	
64	February 28, 1978	@ Los Angeles	2–4	Edwards	The Forum	9,529	19–37–8	46	

March: 2–6–4 (home: 1–2–2; road: 1–4–2)

Game	Date	Opponent	Score	Decision	Arena	Attendance	Record	Pts	Recap
65	March 3, 1978	@ Colorado	2–2	Meloche	McNichols Sports Arena	7,685	19–37–8	47	
66	March 4, 1978	@ Atlanta	3–9	Edwards	The Omni	10,014	19–38–8	47	
67	March 8, 1978	@ N.Y. Rangers	1–6	Meloche	Madison Square Garden	15,469	19–39–9	47	
68	March 11, 1978	@ Toronto	2–5	Edwards	Maple Leaf Gardens	16,485	19–40–9	47	
69	March 15, 1978	Colorado	2–2	Meloche	Coliseum at Richfield	5,266	19–40–10	48	
70	March 17, 1978	Minnesota	4–4	Meloche	Coliseum at Richfield	4,089	19–40–11	49	
71	March 18, 1978	@ Washington	3–8	Edwards	Capital Centre	10,381	19–41–11	49	
72	March 21, 1978	Boston	3–5	Meloche	Coliseum at Richfield	6,117	19–42–11	49	
73	March 24, 1978	Los Angeles	3–4	Meloche	Coliseum at Richfield	4,744	19–43–11	49	
74	March 25, 1978	@ N.Y. Islanders	4–4	Meloche	Nassau Veterans Memorial Coliseum	15,317	19–43–12	50	
75	March 29, 1978	Minnesota	7–3	Meloche	Coliseum at Richfield	5,345	20–43–12	52	
76	March 30, 1978	@ Buffalo	5–3	Meloche	Buffalo Memorial Auditorium	16,433	21–43–12	54	

April: 1–2–1 (home: 1–1–1; road: 0–1–0)

Game	Date	Opponent	Score	Decision	Arena	Attendance	Record	Pts	Recap
77	April 1, 1978	@ St. Louis	1–3	Edwards	The Checkerdome	5,561	21–44–12	54	
78	April 2, 1978	Chicago	4–2	Meloche	Coliseum at Richfield	5,561	22–44–12	56	
79	April 5, 1978	Detroit	5–5	Edwards	Coliseum at Richfield	5,410	22–44–13	57	
80	April 9, 1978	Pittsburgh	2–3	Meloche	Coliseum at Richfield	7,364	22–45–13	57	

Legend: Win (2 points) Loss (0 points) Tie (1 point)

Detailed records

Wales Conference
Opponent	Home	Away	Total	Pts.	Goals scored	Goals allowed
Adams Division
Boston Bruins	0–1–2	1–2–0	1–3–2	4	17	21
Buffalo Sabres	1–2–0	1–2–0	2–4–0	4	20	38
Cleveland Barons	–	–	–	–	–	–
Toronto Maple Leafs	2–1–0	0–3–0	2–4–0	4	17	23
	3–4–2	2–7–0	5–11–2	12	54	82
Norris Division
Detroit Red Wings	1–1–1	1–1–0	2–2–1	5	15	16
Los Angeles Kings	1–1–0	0–2–1	1–3–1	3	9	12
Montreal Canadiens	1–2–0	0–2–0	1–4–0	2	11	23
Pittsburgh Penguins	0–2–0	0–3–0	0–5–0	0	12	21
Washington Capitals	1–2–0	1–1–0	2–3–0	4	14	21
	4–8–1	2–9–1	6–17–2	14	61	93

Campbell Conference
Opponent	Home	Away	Total	Pts.	Goals scored	Goals allowed
Patrick Division
Atlanta Flames	0–1–1	1–1–0	1–2–1	3	16	23
New York Islanders	1–0–1	0–1–1	1–1–2	4	14	14
New York Rangers	1–1–0	0–2–0	1–3–0	2	9	18
Philadelphia Flyers	0–1–1	0–3–0	0–4–1	1	9	29
	2–3–3	1–7–1	3–10–4	10	48	84
Smythe Division
Chicago Black Hawks	1–1–0	0–2–0	1–3–0	2	7	17
Colorado Rockies	1–0–1	0–1–1	1–1–2	4	15	15
Minnesota North Stars	1–0–1	2–0–0	3–0–1	7	20	12
St. Louis Blues	0–1–1	1–1–0	1–2–1	3	9	11
Vancouver Canucks	2–0–0	0–1–1	2–1–1	5	16	11
	5–2–3	3–5–2	8–7–5	21	67	66

== Player stats ==
=== Skaters ===
Note: GP= Games played; G = Goals; A = Assists; Pts = Points; PIM = Penalties in minutes; +/- = Plus/minus

			Regular season						Playoffs
#	Player	Pos	GP	G	A	Pts	PIM	+/-	GP	G	A	Pts	PIM	+/-
21	Dennis Maruk	C	76	36	35	71	50	−26	–	–	–	–	–	–
12	Mike Fidler	LW	78	23	28	51	38	−13	–	–	–	–	–	–
24	Kris Manery	C	78	22	27	49	14	−15	–	–	–	–	–	–
25	Al MacAdam	LW	80	16	32	48	42	−19	–	–	–	–	–	–
7	Dave Gardner	C	75	19	25	44	10	−16	–	–	–	–	–	–
20	Bob Murdoch	RW	71	14	26	40	27	−18	–	–	–	–	–	–
5	Greg Smith	D	80	7	30	37	92	−26	–	–	–	–	–	–
2	Rick Hampton	D	77	18	18	36	19	−24	–	–	–	–	–	–
26	Chuck Arnason^{†}	RW	40	21	13	34	8	−2	–	–	–	–	–	–
8	Walt McKechnie^{†}	C	53	12	22	34	12	−8	–	–	–	–	–	–
15	Jim Neilson	D	68	2	21	23	20	−25	–	–	–	–	–	–
23	J. P. Parise^{†}	LW	40	9	13	22	27	−15	–	–	–	–	–	–
22	Rick Shinske	RW	47	5	12	17	6	−12	–	–	–	–	–	–
6	Jean Potvin^{†}	D	40	3	14	17	30	−4	–	–	–	–	–	–
4	Bob Stewart	D	72	2	15	17	84	−25	–	–	–	–	–	–
16	Ken Kuzyk	RW	28	5	4	9	6	−1	–	–	–	–	–	–
19	John Baby	D	24	2	7	9	26	−10	–	–	–	–	–	–
16	Fred Ahern^{‡}	RW	36	3	4	7	48	−16	–	–	–	–	–	–
14	Mike Crombeen	C	48	3	4	7	13	−26	–	–	–	–	–	–
9	Wayne Merrick^{‡}	C	18	2	5	7	13	−10	–	–	–	–	–	–
3	Mike Christie^{‡}	D	34	1	6	7	49	−14	–	–	–	–	–	–
18	Rick Jodzio^{†}	LW	38	2	3	5	43	−9	–	–	–	–	–	–
28	Randy Holt^{†}	D	48	1	4	5	229	−24	–	–	–	–	–	–
26	Bob Girard^{‡}	LW	25	0	4	4	11	−8	–	–	–	–	–	–
10	Ralph Klassen^{‡}	C	13	2	1	3	6	−2	–	–	–	–	–	–
3	Dennis O'Brien^{†‡}	D	23	0	3	3	31	−13	–	–	–	–	–	–
18	Reg Kerr	LW	7	0	2	2	7	−	–	–	–	–	–	–
6	Darcy Regier^{‡}	D	15	0	1	1	28	−5	–	–	–	–	–	–
1	Gary Edwards	G	30	0	1	1	4	–	–	–	–	–	–	–
29	Jeff Allan	D	4	0	0	0	2	−	–	–	–	–	–	–
13	Bjorn Johansson	D	5	0	0	0	6	−2	–	–	–	–	–	–
8	Dan Chicoine	RW	6	0	0	0	0	−2	–	–	–	–	–	–
27	Gilles Meloche	G	54	0	0	0	4	–	–	–	–	–	–	–

^{†}Denotes player spent time with another team before joining Barons. Stats reflect time with the Barons only. ^{‡}Traded mid-season.

=== Goaltenders ===
Note: GP = Games played; TOI = Time on ice (minutes); W = Wins; L = Losses; T = Ties; GA = Goals against; SO = Shutouts; GAA = Goals against average

		Regular season								Playoffs
Player	#	GP	TOI	W	L	T	GA	SO	GAA	GP	TOI	W	L	GA	SO	GAA
Gilles Meloche	27	54	3100	16	27	8	195	1	3.77	–	–	–	–	–	–	-.--
Gary Edwards	1	30	1700	6	18	5	128	0	4.52	–	–	–	–	–	–	-.--

== Transactions ==
The Barons were involved in the following transactions during the 1977–78 season:

=== Trades ===
August 17, 1977	To Cleveland Barons rights to Mike Eaves	To St. Louis Blues Len Frig
November 23, 1977	To Cleveland Barons Randy Holt	To Chicago Black Hawks Reg Kerr
December 9, 1977	To Cleveland Barons Walt McKechnie	To Washington Capitals Bob Girard; 2nd round pick in 1978 draft (Paul MacKinnon)
January 9, 1978	To Cleveland Barons Chuck Arnason; Rick Jodzio	To Colorado Rockies Fred Ahern; Ralph Klassen
January 10, 1978	To Cleveland Barons J. P. Parise; Jean Potvin; 4th round pick in 1978 draft (cancelled by Barons-North Stars merger)	To New York Islanders Wayne Merrick; Darcy Regier
January 12, 1978	To Cleveland Barons Dennis O'Brien	To Colorado Rockies Mike Christie

=== Additions and subtractions ===
Additions
Player	Former team	Via
Kris Manery	University of Michigan (NCAA)	free agency (1977–10)

Subtractions
Player	New team	Via
Phil Roberto	Birmingham Bulls (WHA)	free agency (July 1977)
Charlie Simmer	Los Angeles Kings	free agency (1977-08-08)
Gary Holt	St. Louis Blues	free agency (1977-10-20)
Dennis O'Brien	Boston Bruins	waivers (1978-03-10)
