= Owen Lloyd (disambiguation) =

Owen Lloyd (born 1957) is a Canadian former ice hockey defenseman

Owen Lloyd may also refer to:

- Owen Lloyd (priest) (1664–1738), Irish Anglican priest
- Owen Edward Pennefather Lloyd (1854–1941), Irish major-general
- Ronald Owen Lloyd Armstrong-Jones (né Jones; 1899–1966), British barrister and soldier
- Owen Lloyd George, 3rd Earl Lloyd-George of Dwyfor (1924–2010), British peer
- Owen Rogers (Owen Lloyd Rogers, born 1958), South African judge

== See also ==
- Lloyd Owen
- David Lloyd Owen
- Gerallt Lloyd Owen
- Geraint Lloyd Owen
