= Chaine =

Chaine is a surname. Notable people with the surname include:

== People ==
- Francis Chaine (born 1921), Hong Kong lawyer and politician
- Guillaume Chaine (born 1986), French judoka
- James Chaine (1841–1885), Irish shipping businessman and a Conservative Party politician
  - Chaine Memorial, a memorial to James Chaine
- John Chaine, Irish Anglican priest
- Robert McCalmont (1881–1953), Northern Irish unionist politician and British Army officer
- Sipho Chaine (born 1996), South African soccer player
- William Chaine (1838–1916), British military officer and courtier

== See also ==
- Kent DuChaine (born 1951), American blues singer and guitarist
