= John Walsh (Anglican priest) =

- Dean of Connor
- Church: Church of Ireland
- Diocese: Diocese of Connor
- Installed: 1739
- Term ended: 1753
- Predecessor: George Cuppaidge
- Successor: Hill Benson

Personal details
- Born: 1691 Lisburn, Ireland
- Died: 1753 (aged 61–62)
- Occupation: Priest
- Education: Trinity College Dublin

John Walsh (1691–1753) was an Irish Anglican priest in the eighteenth century.

Walsh was born in Lisburn and educated at Trinity College, Dublin. He was Dean of Connor from 1739 until his death.
