= Izora =

Izora may be,

- Izora language, Nigeria
- Izora Armstead, singer
- Izora Fair, Confederate spy
- Izora (album), a 2023 album by Buck-Tick
