= Francis Marsh =

Anglo-Irish bishop

The Right Reverend and Right Honourable Francis Marsh PC (Ire), D.D.
- Archbishop of Dublin; Bishop of Glendalough; Primate of Ireland
- Church: Church of Ireland
- Province: Dublin
- Diocese: Dublin and Glendalough
- Appointed: 14 February 1682
- In office: 1682–1693
- Predecessor: John Parker
- Successor: Narcissus Marsh
- Previous posts: Bishop of Limerick, Ardfert and Aghadoe (1667–1673); Bishop of Kilmore and Ardagh (1673–1682)

Orders
- Ordination: 27 January 1661 by Jeremy Taylor
- Consecration: 22 December 1667 by Thomas Price

Personal details
- Born: 23 October 1626 Gloucestershire, England
- Died: 16 November 1693 (aged 67)
- Denomination: Anglican
- Spouse: Mary Taylor

Francis Marsh (23 October 1626 – 16 November 1693) was Archbishop of Dublin from 1682 to 1693.

He was admitted to Emmanuel College, Cambridge in April 1642 as the son of Henry Marsh esq. of Edgeworth, Gloucestershire. He had previously been Dean of Connor (1660–1661), Dean of Armagh (1661–1667), Bishop of Limerick, Ardfert and Aghadoe and Kilmore and Ardagh. He married Mary, the daughter of Bishop Jeremy Taylor. Their son Jeremiah Marsh was the Dean of Kilmore. From his father-in-law, Jeremy Taylor, he inherited a silver watch, said to have been a gift from Charles I. This watch remained in the family of his great-grandson, Francis Marsh, barrister-at-law.

Church of Ireland titles
Preceded by Robert Price	Dean of Connor; 1660–1661	Succeeded by George Rust
Preceded by James Frey	Dean of Armagh; 1661–1667	Succeeded by James Downhame
Preceded by William Fuller	Bishop of Limerick, Ardfert and Aghadoe; 1667–1673	Succeeded by John Vesey
Preceded by Robert Maxwell	Bishop of Kilmore and Ardagh; 1673–1782	Succeeded by William Sheridan
Preceded by John Parker	Archbishop of Dublin; May 1682 – December 1693	Succeeded by Narcissus Marsh
