= 1977–78 Boston Bruins season =

NHL team season

1977–78 Boston Bruins
- Adams Division champions
- Division: 1st Adams
- Conference: 2nd Wales
- 1977–78 record: 51–18–11
- Home record: 29–6–5
- Road record: 22–12–6
- Goals for: 333
- Goals against: 218

Team information
- General manager: Harry Sinden
- Coach: Don Cherry
- Captain: Wayne Cashman
- Alternate captains: None
- Arena: Boston Garden

Team leaders
- Goals: Peter McNab (41)
- Assists: Terry O'Reilly (61)
- Points: Terry O'Reilly (90)
- Penalty minutes: Terry O'Reilly (211)
- Wins: Ron Grahame (26)
- Goals against average: Gilles Gilbert (2.53)

The 1977–78 Boston Bruins season was the Bruins' 54th season in the NHL. The Bruins advanced to the Stanley Cup Finals for the second straight season only to be defeated again by their rivals, the Montreal Canadiens. The season featured the memorable moment of John Wensink challenging the entire Minnesota North Stars bench to a fight during a December contest.

== Offseason ==
=== NHL draft ===
Round	#	Player	Nationality	College/Junior/Club team
1	16	Dwight Foster (RW)	Canada	Kitchener Rangers (OHA)
2	34	Dave Parro (G)	Canada	Saskatoon Blades (WCHL)
3	52	Mike Forbes (D)	Canada	St. Catharines Fincups (OMJHL)
4	70	Brian McGregor (RW)	Canada	Saskatoon Blades (WCHL)
5	88	Doug Butler (D)	Canada	Saint Louis University (CCHA)
6	106	Keith Johnson (D)	Canada	Saskatoon Blades (WCHL)
7	122	Ralph Cox (RW)	United States	University of New Hampshire (ECAC)
8	138	Mario Claude (D)	Canada	Sherbrooke Castors (QMJHL)

== Regular season ==
The 1977–78 Bruins set an NHL record (unbroken as of 2025) by having 11 different skaters score 20 goals or more in a season. The eleven skaters are:

- Peter McNab
- Terry O'Reilly
- Bobby Schmautz
- Stan Jonathan
- Jean Ratelle
- Rick Middleton
- Wayne Cashman
- Gregg Sheppard
- Brad Park
- Don Marcotte
- Bob Miller

=== Season standings ===
Adams Division
	GP	W	L	T	GF	GA	Pts
**Boston Bruins**	80	51	18	11	333	218	113
**Buffalo Sabres**	80	44	19	17	288	215	105
**Toronto Maple Leafs**	80	41	29	10	271	237	92
Cleveland Barons	80	22	45	13	230	325	57

Note: GP = Games played, W = Wins, L = Losses, T = Ties, Pts = Points, GF = Goals for, GA = Goals against
Note: Teams that qualified for the playoffs are highlighted in bold.

=== Record vs. opponents ===
Adams Division record vs. opponents

**Vs. Wales Conference**

**Vs. Campbell Conference**

**Vs. Adams Division**

1977–78 NHL records
Team	**BOS**	**BUF**	**CLE**	**TOR**	**Total**
Boston	—	2–4	3–1–2	5–0–1	**10–5–3**
Buffalo	4–2	—	4–2	2–3–1	**10–7–1**
Cleveland	1–3–2	2–4	—	2–4	**5–13–2**
Toronto	0–5–1	3–2–1	4–2	—	**7–9–2**

**Vs. Norris Division**

1977–78 NHL records
Team	**DET**	**LAK**	**MTL**	**PIT**	**WSH**	**Total**
Boston	4–0–1	5–0	0–4–1	5–0	4–0–1	**18–4–3**
Buffalo	2–2–1	3–0–2	3–2	0–0–5	3–1–1	**11–5–9**
Cleveland	2–2–1	1–3–1	1–4	0–5	2–3	**6–17–2**
Toronto	2–1–2	2–3	0–4–1	2–3	4–0–1	**10–11–4**

**Vs. Patrick Division**

1977–78 NHL records
Team	**ATL**	**NYI**	**NYR**	**PHI**	**Total**
Boston	2–1–1	1–3	4–1	1–2–1	**8–7–2**
Buffalo	2–1–1	3–2	2–1–1	3–0–1	**10–4–3**
Cleveland	1–2–1	1–1–2	1–3	0–4–1	**3–10–4**
Toronto	2–3	1–3	3–1	3–1	**9–8–0**

**Vs. Smythe Division**

1977–78 NHL records
Team	**CHI**	**COL**	**MIN**	**STL**	**VAN**	**Total**
Boston	3–1	3–0–1	3–1	4–0	2–0–2	**15–2–3**
Buffalo	2–1–1	3–1	3–1	4–0	1–0–3	**13–3–4**
Cleveland	1–3	1–1–2	3–0–1	1–2–1	2–1–1	**8–7–5**
Toronto	2–1–1	4–0	4–0	2–0–2	3–0–1	**15–1–4**

== Schedule and results ==
1977–78 regular season
October

Game	Result	Date	Score	Opponent	Record
1	T	October 13, 1977	2–2	Atlanta Flames (1977–78)	0–0–1
2	L	October 15, 1977	1–3	@ New York Islanders (1977–78)	0–1–1
3	L	October 16, 1977	0–2	Montreal Canadiens (1977–78)	0–2–1
4	W	October 19, 1977	7–3	@ St. Louis Blues (1977–78)	1–2–1
5	W	October 22, 1977	4–3	@ Los Angeles Kings (1977–78)	2–2–1
6	T	October 23, 1977	3–3	@ Vancouver Canucks (1977–78)	2–2–2
7	T	October 25, 1977	4–4	@ Colorado Rockies (1977–78)	2–2–3
8	L	October 26, 1977	0–3	@ Minnesota North Stars (1977–78)	2–3–3
9	W	October 29, 1977	5–3	@ Pittsburgh Penguins (1977–78)	3–3–3

November

Game	Result	Date	Score	Opponent	Record
10	L	November 3, 1977	1–4	Buffalo Sabres (1977–78)	3–4–3
11	L	November 5, 1977	2–5	@ Montreal Canadiens (1977–78)	3–5–3
12	W	November 6, 1977	5–3	New York Islanders (1977–78)	4–5–3
13	W	November 10, 1977	5–2	Los Angeles Kings (1977–78)	5–5–3
14	W	November 12, 1977	6–3	@ Atlanta Flames (1977–78)	6–5–3
15	W	November 13, 1977	3–1	Cleveland Barons (1977–78)	7–5–3
16	T	November 17, 1977	4–4	Vancouver Canucks (1977–78)	7–5–4
17	W	November 19, 1977	3–1	@ Toronto Maple Leafs (1977–78)	8–5–4
18	W	November 20, 1977	1–0	Chicago Black Hawks (1977–78)	9–5–4
19	W	November 23, 1977	2–0	@ Buffalo Sabres (1977–78)	10–5–4
20	W	November 24, 1977	6–0	Washington Capitals (1977–78)	11–5–4
21	W	November 26, 1977	3–2	New York Rangers (1977–78)	12–5–4
22	W	November 27, 1977	4–1	St. Louis Blues (1977–78)	13–5–4

December

Game	Result	Date	Score	Opponent	Record
23	W	December 1, 1977	4–2	Minnesota North Stars (1977–78)	14–5–4
24	T	December 3, 1977	4–4	@ Cleveland Barons (1977–78)	14–5–5
25	W	December 4, 1977	3–1	Toronto Maple Leafs (1977–78)	15–5–5
26	W	December 8, 1977	6–4	Detroit Red Wings (1977–78)	16–5–5
27	W	December 10, 1977	6–2	Pittsburgh Penguins (1977–78)	17–5–5
28	W	December 11, 1977	8–2	@ New York Rangers (1977–78)	18–5–5
29	L	December 15, 1977	4–6	@ Philadelphia Flyers (1977–78)	18–6–5
30	L	December 17, 1977	1–4	@ New York Islanders (1977–78)	18–7–5
31	W	December 18, 1977	2–1	Cleveland Barons (1977–78)	19–7–5
32	W	December 21, 1977	6–3	Colorado Rockies (1977–78)	20–7–5
33	W	December 23, 1977	6–1	Philadelphia Flyers (1977–78)	21–7–5
34	W	December 27, 1977	6–3	@ Washington Capitals (1977–78)	22–7–5
35	T	December 28, 1977	5–5	@ Cleveland Barons (1977–78)	22–7–6
36	W	December 31, 1977	7–0	@ Detroit Red Wings (1977–78)	23–7–6

January

Game	Result	Date	Score	Opponent	Record
37	W	January 4, 1978	3–0	@ Chicago Black Hawks (1977–78)	24–7–6
38	W	January 7, 1978	3–1	@ Minnesota North Stars (1977–78)	25–7–6
39	L	January 8, 1978	3–5	@ Buffalo Sabres (1977–78)	25–8–6
40	L	January 10, 1978	2–3	New York Rangers (1977–78)	25–9–6
41	W	January 12, 1978	6–1	Los Angeles Kings (1977–78)	26–9–6
42	L	January 14, 1978	3–5	@ Montreal Canadiens (1977–78)	26–10–6
43	W	January 19, 1978	4–1	Washington Capitals (1977–78)	27–10–6
44	W	January 21, 1978	7–1	Detroit Red Wings (1977–78)	28–10–6
45	L	January 22, 1978	2–3	Cleveland Barons (1977–78)	28–11–6
46	W	January 26, 1978	4–3	Colorado Rockies (1977–78)	29–11–6
47	W	January 27, 1978	5–2	@ Washington Capitals (1977–78)	30–11–6
48	W	January 29, 1978	8–2	Pittsburgh Penguins (1977–78)	31–11–6

February

Game	Result	Date	Score	Opponent	Record
49	W	February 1, 1978	5–3	@ St. Louis Blues (1977–78)	32–11–6
50	L	February 2, 1978	1–3	@ Buffalo Sabres (1977–78)	32–12–6
51	W	February 4, 1978	8–1	@ Pittsburgh Penguins (1977–78)	33–12–6
52	T	February 5, 1978	3–3	Toronto Maple Leafs (1977–78)	33–12–7
53	W	February 9, 1978	5–3	@ Detroit Red Wings (1977–78)	34–12–7
54	W	February 15, 1978	4–2	@ Toronto Maple Leafs (1977–78)	35–12–7
55	L	February 18, 1978	2–4	@ Chicago Black Hawks (1977–78)	35–13–7
56	W	February 21, 1978	3–2	@ Colorado Rockies (1977–78)	36–13–7
57	W	February 22, 1978	6–4	@ Vancouver Canucks (1977–78)	37–13–7
58	W	February 25, 1978	4–2	@ Los Angeles Kings (1977–78)	38–13–7
59	T	February 28, 1978	4–4	Philadelphia Flyers (1977–78)	38–13–8

March

Game	Result	Date	Score	Opponent	Record
60	W	March 2, 1978	4–3	Atlanta Flames (1977–78)	39–13–8
61	W	March 4, 1978	7–3	Buffalo Sabres (1977–78)	40–13–8
62	W	March 5, 1978	6–3	Vancouver Canucks (1977–78)	41–13–8
63	W	March 7, 1978	7–2	St. Louis Blues (1977–78)	42–13–8
64	T	March 9, 1978	2–2	@ Detroit Red Wings (1977–78)	42–13–9
65	L	March 11, 1978	2–6	@ Philadelphia Flyers (1977–78)	42–14–9
66	W	March 12, 1978	9–3	Los Angeles Kings (1977–78)	43–14–9
67	W	March 16, 1978	7–2	Minnesota North Stars (1977–78)	44–14–9
68	W	March 18, 1978	6–3	@ New York Rangers (1977–78)	45–14–9
69	W	March 19, 1978	6–4	Toronto Maple Leafs (1977–78)	46–14–9
70	W	March 21, 1978	5–3	@ Cleveland Barons (1977–78)	47–14–9
71	W	March 23, 1978	7–0	Chicago Black Hawks (1977–78)	48–14–9
72	L	March 25, 1978	3–6	@ Atlanta Flames (1977–78)	48–15–9
73	T	March 26, 1978	2–2	Montreal Canadiens (1977–78)	48–15–10
74	T	March 28, 1978	4–4	@ Washington Capitals (1977–78)	48–15–11
75	W	March 30, 1978	6–3	Pittsburgh Penguins (1977–78)	49–15–11

April

Game	Result	Date	Score	Opponent	Record
76	L	April 1, 1978	1–7	@ Montreal Canadiens (1977–78)	49–16–11
77	W	April 2, 1978	8–3	New York Rangers (1977–78)	50–16–11
78	L	April 6, 1978	2–5	Buffalo Sabres (1977–78)	50–17–11
79	W	April 8, 1978	3–1	@ Toronto Maple Leafs (1977–78)	51–17–11
80	L	April 9, 1978	2–5	New York Islanders (1977–78)	51–18–11

Legend: Win (2 points) Loss (0 points) Tie (1 point)

=== Season summary ===
- December 1: Following a fight with Alex Pirus, John Wensink skates over to the Minnesota bench and challenges the entire team but no player responds.

== Player statistics ==
=== Regular season ===
Scoring

Player	Pos	GP	G	A	Pts	PIM	+/-	PPG	SHG	GWG
Terry O'Reilly	RW	77	29	61	90	211	40	5	0	4
Jean Ratelle	C	80	25	59	84	10	49	3	0	5
Peter McNab	C	79	41	39	80	4	35	5	0	5
Brad Park	D	80	22	57	79	79	68	9	0	3
Wayne Cashman	LW	76	24	38	62	69	34	1	0	2
Rick Middleton	RW	79	25	35	60	8	40	2	0	6
Gregg Sheppard	C	54	23	36	59	24	19	5	1	7
Bobby Schmautz	RW	54	27	27	54	87	24	4	3	6
Don Marcotte	LW	77	20	34	54	16	32	4	2	0
Stan Jonathan	LW	68	27	25	52	116	34	0	0	2
Bob Miller	C	76	20	20	40	41	16	1	1	4
Mike Milbury	D	80	8	30	38	151	52	0	0	0
John Wensink	LW	80	16	20	36	181	23	1	0	3
Rick Smith	D	79	7	29	36	69	70	0	0	0
John Bucyk	LW	53	5	13	18	4	−2	5	0	0
Gary Doak	D	61	4	13	17	50	37	1	0	2
Al Sims	D	43	2	8	10	6	11	0	0	1
Matti Hagman	C	15	4	1	5	2	−1	3	0	1
Dennis O'Brien	D	16	2	3	5	29	6	0	0	0
Mike Forbes	D	32	0	4	4	15	−5	0	0	0
Dwight Foster	RW	14	2	1	3	6	1	0	0	0
Doug Halward	D	25	0	2	2	2	1	0	0	0
Gerry Cheevers	G	21	0	1	1	14	0	0	0	0
Gilles Gilbert	G	25	0	1	1	8	0	0	0	0
Ron Grahame	G	40	0	1	1	0	0	0	0	0
Darryl Edestrand	D	1	0	0	0	0	−1	0	0	0
Steve Langdon	LW	2	0	0	0	0	−1	0	0	0
Clayton Pachal	C/LW	10	0	0	0	14	−1	0	0	0
Jim Pettie	G	1	0	0	0	6	0	0	0	0
Sean Shanahan	C/RW	6	0	0	0	7	−1	0	0	0

Goaltending

Player	MIN	GP	W	L	T	GA	GAA	SO
Ron Grahame	2328	40	26	6	7	107	2.76	3
Gilles Gilbert	1326	25	15	6	2	56	2.53	2
Gerry Cheevers	1086	21	10	5	2	48	2.65	1
Jim Pettie	60	1	0	1	0	6	6.00	0
Team:	4800	80	51	18	11	217	2.71	6

=== Playoffs ===
Scoring

Player	Pos	GP	G	A	Pts	PIM	PPG	SHG	GWG
Brad Park	D	15	9	11	20	14	4	0	0
Peter McNab	C	15	8	11	19	2	0	0	2
Bobby Schmautz	RW	15	7	8	15	11	2	0	1
Terry O'Reilly	RW	15	5	10	15	40	1	0	1
Gregg Sheppard	C	15	2	10	12	6	0	0	0
Wayne Cashman	LW	15	4	6	10	13	3	0	2
Jean Ratelle	C	15	3	7	10	0	0	0	0
Don Marcotte	LW	15	5	4	9	8	1	0	1
Mike Milbury	D	15	1	8	9	27	0	0	0
Rick Middleton	RW	15	5	2	7	0	0	0	2
Rick Smith	D	15	1	5	6	18	0	0	0
John Wensink	LW	15	2	2	4	54	0	0	0
Bob Miller	C	13	0	3	3	15	0	0	0
Gary Doak	D	12	1	0	1	4	0	0	1
Stan Jonathan	LW	15	0	1	1	36	0	0	0
Dennis O'Brien	D	14	0	1	1	28	0	0	0
Gerry Cheevers	G	12	0	0	0	6	0	0	0
Ron Grahame	G	4	0	0	0	0	0	0	0
Al Sims	D	8	0	0	0	0	0	0	0

Goaltending

Player	MIN	GP	W	L	GA	GAA	SO
Gerry Cheevers	731	12	8	4	35	2.87	1
Ron Grahame	202	4	2	1	7	2.08	0
Team:	933	15	10	5	42	2.70	1

Note:

Pos = Position;GP = Games played; G = Goals; A = Assists; Pts = Points; PIM = Penalty minutes; +/- = Plus/minus; PPG = Power-play goals; SHG = Short-handed goals; GWG = Game-winning goals
Pos = Position;GP = Games played; Min, TOI = Minutes played; W = Wins; L = Losses; T,T/OT = Ties; OTL = Overtime losses; GA = Goals-against; GAA = Goals-against average; SO = Shutouts; SA = Shots against; SV = Shots saved;SV% = Save percentage;

== Playoffs ==
=== Stanley Cup finals ===
Date	Visitors	Score	Home	Score	Notes
May 13	Boston	1	Montreal	4	
May 16	Boston	2	Montreal	3	OT
May 18	Montreal	0	Boston	4	
May 21	Montreal	3	Boston	4	OT
May 23	Boston	1	Montreal	4	
May 25	Montreal	4	Boston	1	

Montreal wins the series 4–2.

Larry Robinson won the Conn Smythe Trophy as playoff MVP.

== Awards and records ==
- Don Cherry, Runner-Up, Jack Adams Trophy
- Brad Park, Defenceman, NHL First Team All-Star
