= Henry Leslie (dean of Connor) =

- Dean of Connor
- Church: Church of Ireland
- Diocese: Diocese of Connor
- Predecessor: Theophilus Blakely
- Successor: John Chaine

Personal details
- Born: 1775
- Died: 1848 (aged 72–73)
- Education: Trinity College Dublin

Henry Leslie (1775 – 24 Jan 1848) was Dean of Connor from 1825 to 1838.

Church of Ireland titles
Preceded by Theophilus Blakely	Dean of Connor; 1825–1838	Succeeded by John Chaine
