= Faires =

Faires is a surname. Notable people with the surname include:

- Barbara Trader Faires (born 1943), British mathematics professor
- Daniel Grady Faires (born 1983), American contractor, interior designer, and craftsman
- Jay Faires, American entrepreneur and investor

== See also ==
- Fairs (surname)
