= Die Close =

Studio album by Blood Vulture
- Released: June 27, 2025
- Length: 44:35
- Label: Pure Noise
- Producer: Jordan Olds

Die Close is the debut studio album by metal band Blood Vulture, led by internet show host Jordan Olds. It was released on June 27, 2025, via Pure Noise Records in LP, CD and digital formats.

== Reception ==
Professional ratings
Review scores
Source	Rating
Distorted Sound	8/10 stars
Kerrang!	4/5 stars
Metal Hammer	8/10 stars
New Noise	5/5 stars

Die Close received a five-star rating from New Noise, which noted, "So much to be said about this album, a complete work of art. This dark audio canvas encapsulates the doom sludge metal loved by so many; highly recommended."

Kerrang! rated it four out of five and commented about the album's "over-arching concept" and "its protagonist a vampire who's outlived humanity and now faces the end of days alone."

Metal Hammer's Perran Helyes assigned the album a rating of eight out of ten and remarked, "A gorgeous, girthy guitar tone counterbalances the album's churning low end with expressive doom leads, as Jordan's Jerry Cantrell-esque voice hits a resplendent gothic tone amid the heavy riffs."

Distorted Sound described it as "A truly captivating debut and leaves in its wake, an unquenchable thirst for more," giving it a rating of eight.

== Track listing ==
All tracks are written by Jordan Olds.

Die Close track listing
No.	Title	Length
1.	"Die Close: Overture"	1:47
2.	"An Embrace in the Flood"	5:31
3.	"A Dream About Starving to Death"	5:50
4.	"Grey Mourning" (featuring Jade Puget)	4:29
5.	"Entwined" (featuring Kristin Hayter)	4:55
6.	"Die Close: Interlude"	1:33
7.	"Burn for It" (featuring Brian Fair)	5:05
8.	"The Silence of God"	5:48
9.	"Abomination"	4:06
10.	"Die Close: Finale"	5:31
Total length:		44:35

== Personnel ==
Credits adapted from Tidal.

- Jordan Olds – lead vocals, electric guitar, bass, synthesizer, production
- Moe Watso – drums
- Mario Quintero – mixing
- Brad Boatright – mastering
- Nick Cageao – engineering
- Phil Pluskota – engineering
- Bryan Batiste – pre-production
- Jade Puget – electric guitar on "Grey Mourning"
- Kayleigh Goldsworthy – viola on "Entwined", "Die Close: Interlude", and "Abomination"
- Kristin Hayter – lead vocals on "Entwind", background vocals on "Die Close: Finale"
- Gina Gleason – electric guitar on "Die Close: Interlude", background vocals on "Die Close: Finale"
- Bryan Fair – vocals on "Burn for It"
- Emily Lee – background vocals on "Die Close: Finale"
- Steve Brodsky – background vocals on "Die Close: Finale"
