= 1977–78 Pittsburgh Penguins season =

NHL team season

1977–78 Pittsburgh Penguins
- Division: 4th Norris
- Conference: 7th Wales
- 1977–78 record: 25–37–18
- Home record: 16–15–9
- Road record: 9–22–9
- Goals for: 254
- Goals against: 321

Team information
- General manager: Baz Bastien
- Coach: Johnny Wilson
- Captain: Jean Pronovost
- Alternate captains: None
- Arena: Pittsburgh Civic Arena

Team leaders
- Goals: Jean Pronovost (40)
- Assists: Greg Malone (43)
- Points: Jean Pronovost (65)
- Penalty minutes: Dave Schultz (378)
- Wins: Denis Herron (20)
- Goals against average: Denis Herron (3.57)

The 1977–78 Pittsburgh Penguins season was their 11th in the National Hockey League (NHL). They finished fourth in the Norris Division, thus did not qualify for the Stanley Cup playoffs. This was their worst regular season since 1974, with only 68 points, and the first time since 1974 that the Penguins did not qualify for the playoffs for the first time since the 1973–74 season.

== Off-season ==
In the off-season head coach Ken Schinkel was replaced by former Kings, Red Wings and Rockies head coach Johnny Wilson. Veterans Vic Hadfield and Ed Van Impe retired. Defensive forward J. Bob Kelly's contract ended and he took his services to Chicago, while Captain Ron Schock was traded to the Sabres (Jean Pronovost was named captain in his place).

== Regular season ==
In an attempt to replace Kelly general manager Baz Bastien acquired former Flyer enforcer Dave Schultz early in the season, but the price was high: Syl Apps Jr., one of the team's all-time leading scorers. Schultz was traded the following season.

Frustrated with the performance of talented winger Pierre Larouche, Bastien dealt the 22-year-old to the Montreal Canadiens for veteran Pete Mahovlich and prospect Peter Lee on November 29, 1977. Larouche would go on to win two Stanley Cup championships with the Canadiens, while Mahovlich was traded to the Red Wings less than two years later. Lee would fail to live up to his promise, scoring an average of only 0.57 points per game over the course of six seasons with the Penguins.

The high roster turnover, particularly from three of the previous season's top five scorers, contributed to the Penguins missing the playoffs for the first time in four seasons.

=== Division standings ===
Norris Division
	GP	W	L	T	GF	GA	Pts
**Montreal Canadiens**	80	59	10	11	359	183	129
**Detroit Red Wings**	80	32	34	14	252	266	78
**Los Angeles Kings**	80	31	34	15	243	245	77
Pittsburgh Penguins	80	25	37	18	254	321	68
Washington Capitals	80	17	49	14	195	321	48

Note: GP = Games played, W = Wins, L = Losses, T = Ties, Pts = Points, GF = Goals for, GA = Goals against
Note: Teams that qualified for the playoffs are highlighted in bold.

=== Record vs. opponents ===
Norris Division record vs. opponents

**Vs. Wales Conference**

**Vs. Campbell Conference**

**Vs. Norris Division**

1977–78 NHL records
Team	**DET**	**LAK**	**MTL**	**PIT**	**WSH**	**Total**
Detroit	—	3–2–1	1–4–1	3–2–1	4–1–1	**11–9–4**
Los Angeles	2–3–1	—	1–4–1	3–0–3	4–2	**10–9–5**
Montreal	4–1–1	4–1–1	—	5–1	5–0–1	**18–3–3**
Pittsburgh	2–3–1	0–3–3	1–5	—	1–4–1	**4–15–5**
Washington	1–4–1	2–4	0–5–1	4–1–1	—	**7–12–5**

**Vs. Adams Division**

1977–78 NHL records
Team	**BOS**	**BUF**	**CLE**	**TOR**	**Total**
Detroit	0–4–1	2–2–1	2–2–1	1–2–2	**5–10–5**
Los Angeles	0–5	0–3–2	3–1–1	3–2	**6–11–3**
Montreal	4–0–1	2–3	4–1	4–0–1	**14–4–2**
Pittsburgh	0–5	0–0–5	5–0	3–2	**8–7–5**
Washington	0–4–1	1–3–1	3–2	0–4–1	**4–13–3**

**Vs. Patrick Division**

1977–78 NHL records
Team	**ATL**	**NYI**	**NYR**	**PHI**	**Total**
Detroit	2–1–1	0–4	1–2–1	1–2–1	**4–9–3**
Los Angeles	2–1–1	0–2–2	3–1	0–3–1	**5–7–4**
Montreal	2–0–2	4–0	3–1	2–0–2	**11–1–4**
Pittsburgh	1–3	1–2–1	2–0–2	0–3–1	**4–8–4**
Washington	2–1–1	0–4	0–2–2	0–4	**2–11–3**

**Vs. Smythe Division**

1977–78 NHL records
Team	**CHI**	**COL**	**MIN**	**STL**	**VAN**	**Total**
Detroit	1–3	2–1–1	4–0	3–1	2–1–1	**12–6–2**
Los Angeles	2–2	2–1–1	2–1–1	2–2	2–1–1	**10–7–3**
Montreal	3–0–1	4–0	2–2	4–0	3–0–1	**16–2–2**
Pittsburgh	2–1–1	2–1–1	2–2	2–1–1	1–2–1	**9–7–4**
Washington	0–3–1	2–1–1	1–2–1	1–1–2	0–4	**4–11–5**

== Schedule and results ==
1977–78 regular season
October: 3–5–1 (home: 2–3–0; road: 1–2–1), 7 points

#	Date	Visitor	Score	Home	Location	Record	Points
1	Oct 12	St. Louis Blues	2–4	Pittsburgh Penguins	The Checkerdome	1–0–0	2
2	Oct 14	Pittsburgh Penguins	1–2	Washington Capitals	Capital Centre	1–1–0	2
3	Oct 15	Philadelphia Flyers	8–2	Pittsburgh Penguins	The Spectrum	1–2–0	2
4	Oct 19	Pittsburgh Penguins	3–3	New York Rangers	Madison Square Garden (IV)	1–2–1	3
5	Oct 20	Pittsburgh Penguins	0–11	Philadelphia Flyers	The Spectrum	1–3–1	3
6	Oct 22	Atlanta Flames	2–5	Pittsburgh Penguins	Omni Coliseum	2–3–1	5
7	Oct 23	Pittsburgh Penguins	3–2	Cleveland Barons	Coliseum at Richfield	3–3–1	7
8	Oct 26	Detroit Red Wings	4–3	Pittsburgh Penguins	Olympia Stadium	3–4–1	7
9	Oct 29	Boston Bruins	5–3	Pittsburgh Penguins	Boston Garden	3–5–1	7

November: 4–6–3 (home: 4–0–1; road: 0–6–2), 11 points

#	Date	Visitor	Score	Home	Location	Record	Points
10	Nov 2	Pittsburgh Penguins	1–3	Detroit Red Wings	Olympia Stadium	3–6–1	7
11	Nov 4	Pittsburgh Penguins	2–5	Atlanta Flames	Omni Coliseum	3–7–1	7
12	Nov 5	Pittsburgh Penguins	3–4	New York Islanders	Nassau Veterans Memorial Coliseum	3–8–1	7
13	Nov 9	Cleveland Barons	3–5	Pittsburgh Penguins	Coliseum at Richfield	4–8–1	9
14	Nov 12	Chicago Black Hawks	4–7	Pittsburgh Penguins	Chicago Stadium	5–8–1	11
15	Nov 13	Pittsburgh Penguins	3–3	Buffalo Sabres	Buffalo Memorial Auditorium	5–8–2	12
16	Nov 16	Pittsburgh Penguins	4–7	Minnesota North Stars	Met Center	5–9–2	12
17	Nov 19	New York Rangers	5–5	Pittsburgh Penguins	Madison Square Garden (IV)	5–9–3	13
18	Nov 22	Pittsburgh Penguins	3–3	Vancouver Canucks	Pacific Coliseum	5–9–4	14
19	Nov 24	Pittsburgh Penguins	3–5	Los Angeles Kings	The Forum	5–10–4	14
20	Nov 26	New York Islanders	2–5	Pittsburgh Penguins	Nassau Veterans Memorial Coliseum	6–10–4	16
21	Nov 29	Pittsburgh Penguins	1–9	Montreal Canadiens	Montreal Forum	6–11–4	16
22	Nov 30	Detroit Red Wings	4–6	Pittsburgh Penguins	Olympia Stadium	7–11–4	18

December: 4–6–4 (home: 2–3–2; road: 2–3–2), 12 points

#	Date	Visitor	Score	Home	Location	Record	Points
23	Dec 3	Buffalo Sabres	4–4	Pittsburgh Penguins	Buffalo Memorial Auditorium	7–11–5	19
24	Dec 4	Pittsburgh Penguins	4–2	Washington Capitals	Capital Centre	8–11–5	21
25	Dec 6	Pittsburgh Penguins	3–3	Colorado Rockies	McNichols Sports Arena	8–11–6	22
26	Dec 8	Los Angeles Kings	5–3	Pittsburgh Penguins	The Forum	8–12–6	22
27	Dec 10	Pittsburgh Penguins	2–6	Boston Bruins	Boston Garden	8–13–6	22
28	Dec 11	Atlanta Flames	5–1	Pittsburgh Penguins	Omni Coliseum	8–14–6	22
29	Dec 14	Pittsburgh Penguins	2–3	St. Louis Blues	The Checkerdome	8–15–6	22
30	Dec 17	Montreal Canadiens	3–5	Pittsburgh Penguins	Montreal Forum	9–15–6	24
31	Dec 22	Pittsburgh Penguins	3–3	Buffalo Sabres	Buffalo Memorial Auditorium	9–15–7	25
32	Dec 23	Toronto Maple Leafs	6–2	Pittsburgh Penguins	Maple Leaf Gardens	9–16–7	25
33	Dec 26	Pittsburgh Penguins	5–4	Toronto Maple Leafs	Maple Leaf Gardens	10–16–7	27
34	Dec 28	Washington Capitals	2–2	Pittsburgh Penguins	Capital Centre	10–16–8	28
35	Dec 29	Pittsburgh Penguins	3–4	Montreal Canadiens	Montreal Forum	10–17–8	28
36	Dec 31	Cleveland Barons	3–6	Pittsburgh Penguins	Coliseum at Richfield	11–17–8	30

January: 5–5–3 (home: 3–2–2; road: 2–3–1), 13 points

#	Date	Visitor	Score	Home	Location	Record	Points
37	Jan 2	Pittsburgh Penguins	2–3	Washington Capitals	Capital Centre	11–18–8	30
38	Jan 4	Vancouver Canucks	3–8	Pittsburgh Penguins	Pacific Coliseum	12–18–8	32
39	Jan 7	Los Angeles Kings	3–3	Pittsburgh Penguins	The Forum	12–18–9	33
40	Jan 9	Pittsburgh Penguins	5–3	New York Rangers	Madison Square Garden (IV)	13–18–9	35
41	Jan 11	Montreal Canadiens	8–6	Pittsburgh Penguins	Montreal Forum	13–19–9	35
42	Jan 12	Pittsburgh Penguins	4–4	Philadelphia Flyers	The Spectrum	13–19–10	36
43	Jan 14	Cleveland Barons	2–4	Pittsburgh Penguins	Coliseum at Richfield	14–19–10	38
44	Jan 18	Pittsburgh Penguins	0–1	Atlanta Flames	Omni Coliseum	14–20–10	38
45	Jan 21	Washington Capitals	5–2	Pittsburgh Penguins	Capital Centre	14–21–10	38
46	Jan 22	New York Rangers	1–3	Pittsburgh Penguins	Madison Square Garden (IV)	15–21–10	40
47	Jan 28	Buffalo Sabres	3–3	Pittsburgh Penguins	Buffalo Memorial Auditorium	15–21–11	41
48	Jan 29	Pittsburgh Penguins	2–8	Boston Bruins	Boston Garden	15–22–11	41
49	Jan 31	Pittsburgh Penguins	5–3	Detroit Red Wings	Olympia Stadium	16–22–11	43

February: 4–2–5 (home: 2–2–2; road: 2–0–3), 13 points

#	Date	Visitor	Score	Home	Location	Record	Points
50	Feb 1	Minnesota North Stars	1–6	Pittsburgh Penguins	Met Center	17–22–11	45
51	Feb 4	Boston Bruins	8–1	Pittsburgh Penguins	Boston Garden	17–23–11	45
52	Feb 7	Pittsburgh Penguins	4–2	Colorado Rockies	McNichols Sports Arena	18–23–11	47
53	Feb 11	Pittsburgh Penguins	3–3	Los Angeles Kings	The Forum	18–23–12	48
54	Feb 14	Chicago Black Hawks	1–2	Pittsburgh Penguins	Chicago Stadium	19–23–12	50
55	Feb 18	Los Angeles Kings	1–1	Pittsburgh Penguins	The Forum	19–23–13	51
56	Feb 19	Pittsburgh Penguins	2–2	Chicago Black Hawks	Chicago Stadium	19–23–14	52
57	Feb 21	Pittsburgh Penguins	5–4	St. Louis Blues	The Checkerdome	20–23–14	54
58	Feb 22	St. Louis Blues	2–2	Pittsburgh Penguins	The Checkerdome	20–23–15	55
59	Feb 25	Philadelphia Flyers	3–1	Pittsburgh Penguins	The Spectrum	20–24–15	55
60	Feb 26	Pittsburgh Penguins	4–4	Buffalo Sabres	Buffalo Memorial Auditorium	20–24–16	56

March: 2–11–2 (home: 1–4–2; road: 1–7–0), 6 points

#	Date	Visitor	Score	Home	Location	Record	Points
61	Mar 1	Montreal Canadiens	5–2	Pittsburgh Penguins	Montreal Forum	20–25–16	56
62	Mar 4	Pittsburgh Penguins	3–6	New York Islanders	Nassau Veterans Memorial Coliseum	20–26–16	56
63	Mar 5	New York Islanders	3–3	Pittsburgh Penguins	Nassau Veterans Memorial Coliseum	20–26–17	57
64	Mar 8	Colorado Rockies	3–5	Pittsburgh Penguins	McNichols Sports Arena	21–26–17	59
65	Mar 11	Vancouver Canucks	3–1	Pittsburgh Penguins	Pacific Coliseum	21–27–17	59
66	Mar 12	Toronto Maple Leafs	7–1	Pittsburgh Penguins	Maple Leaf Gardens	21–28–17	59
67	Mar 14	Pittsburgh Penguins	2–4	Los Angeles Kings	The Forum	21–29–17	59
68	Mar 15	Pittsburgh Penguins	4–7	Vancouver Canucks	Pacific Coliseum	21–30–17	59
69	Mar 18	Pittsburgh Penguins	3–2	Toronto Maple Leafs	Maple Leaf Gardens	22–30–17	61
70	Mar 19	Pittsburgh Penguins	1–9	Chicago Black Hawks	Chicago Stadium	22–31–17	61
71	Mar 21	Pittsburgh Penguins	1–7	Minnesota North Stars	Met Center	22–32–17	61
72	Mar 22	Colorado Rockies	5–2	Pittsburgh Penguins	McNichols Sports Arena	22–33–17	61
73	Mar 25	Detroit Red Wings	2–2	Pittsburgh Penguins	Olympia Stadium	22–33–18	62
74	Mar 29	Pittsburgh Penguins	2–6	Montreal Canadiens	Montreal Forum	22–34–18	62
75	Mar 30	Pittsburgh Penguins	3–6	Boston Bruins	Boston Garden	22–35–18	62

April: 3–2–0 (home: 2–1–0; road: 1–1–0), 6 points

#	Date	Visitor	Score	Home	Location	Record	Points
76	Apr 2	Toronto Maple Leafs	3–6	Pittsburgh Penguins	Maple Leaf Gardens	23–35–18	64
77	Apr 5	Minnesota North Stars	2–7	Pittsburgh Penguins	Met Center	24–35–18	66
78	Apr 6	Pittsburgh Penguins	4–6	Detroit Red Wings	Olympia Stadium	24–36–18	66
79	Apr 8	Washington Capitals	6–4	Pittsburgh Penguins	Capital Centre	24–37–18	66
80	Apr 9	Pittsburgh Penguins	3–2	Cleveland Barons	Coliseum at Richfield	25–37–18	68

Legend: Win (2 points) Loss (0 points) Tie (1 point)

== Player statistics ==
Skaters

Regular season
Player	GP	G	A	Pts	+/−	PIM
Jean Pronovost	79	40	25	65	–16	50
Peter Mahovlich^{†}	57	25	36	61	4	37
Greg Malone	78	18	43	61	–16	80
Gene Carr^{†}	70	17	37	54	–15	76
Rick Kehoe	70	29	21	50	–18	10
Blair Chapman	75	24	20	44	–11	37
Tom Edur^{†}	58	5	38	43	–9	18
Dave Schultz^{†}	66	9	25	34	–9	378
Wayne Bianchin	61	20	13	33	–14	40
Mike Corrigan	25	8	12	20	–7	10
Ron Stackhouse	50	5	15	20	–16	36
Brian Spencer	79	9	11	20	–18	81
Dave Burrows	67	4	15	19	–30	24
Russ Anderson	74	2	16	18	–5	150
Peter Lee	60	5	13	18	–11	19
Lowell MacDonald	19	5	8	13	0	2
Bob Paradise	64	2	10	12	–30	53
John Flesch	29	7	5	12	–7	19
Pierre Larouche^{‡}	20	6	5	11	–13	0
Dennis Owchar^{‡}	22	2	8	10	–12	23
Colin Campbell	55	1	9	10	–19	103
Tom Cassidy	26	3	4	7	–4	15
Syl Apps Jr.^{‡}	9	0	7	7	0	0
Mario Faubert	18	0	6	6	2	11
James Hamilton	25	2	4	6	–3	2
Derek Sanderson	13	3	1	4	–6	0
Jacques Cossette	19	1	2	3	–5	4
Lew Morrison	8	0	2	2	3	0
Hartland Monahan^{‡}	7	2	0	2	–7	2
Thomas Price	10	0	0	0	–4	0
Kim Davis	1	0	0	0	0	0
Total		254	411	665	—	1,280

Goaltenders

Regular Season
Player	GP	W	L	T	GA	SO
Denis Herron	60	20	25	15	210	0
Dunc Wilson	21	5	11	3	95	0
Greg Redquest	1	0	0	0	3	0
Gordon Laxton	2	0	1	0	9	0
Total		25	37	18	317	0

^{†}Denotes player spent time with another team before joining the Penguins. Stats reflect time with the Penguins only.
^{‡}Denotes player was traded mid-season. Stats reflect time with the Penguins only.

== Awards and records ==
- Jean Pronovost established a career franchise record for games (753), goals (316) and points (603). He had led in goals since 1972 and games and points since 1973.
- Syl Apps Jr. established a career franchise record for assists (349). He had led the category since 1972.
- Dave Schultz established a franchise record for penalty minutes in a season with 378. He was also the first to record 300 PIMs in a season, beating the previous high of 212 held by Bryan Watson.

== Transactions ==
The Penguins were involved in the following transactions during the 1977–78 season:

=== Trades ===
September 20, 1977	To Buffalo Sabres Ron Schock	To Pittsburgh Penguins Brian Spencer
October 1, 1977	To Washington Capitals rights to Don Awrey	To Pittsburgh Penguins Bob Paradise
October 16, 1977	To Washington Capitals 1979 1st round pick (Tom McCarthy)	To Pittsburgh Penguins Hartland Monahan
November 2, 1977	To Los Angeles Kings Syl Apps Jr. Hartland Monahan	To Pittsburgh Penguins Gene Carr; Dave Schultz; 1978 4th round pick (Shane Pearsall)
November 29, 1977	To Montreal Canadiens Pierre Larouche future considerations (rights to Peter Marsh)	To Pittsburgh Penguins Peter Lee; Pete Mahovlich
December 2, 1977	To Colorado Rockies Dennis Owchar	To Pittsburgh Penguins Tom Edur
June 13, 1978	To Toronto Maple Leafs Dave Burrows; 1978 6th round pick (Mel Hewitt)	To Pittsburgh Penguins Randy Carlyle; George Ferguson

=== Additions and subtractions ===
Additions
Player	Former team	Via
Tom Cassidy	Boston Bruins	free agency (1977-10-11)
John Flesch	Minnesota North Stars	free agency (1978-02-04)
Derek Sanderson	Vancouver Canucks	free agency (1978-03-14)

Subtractions
Player	New team	Via
J. Bob Kelly	Chicago Black Hawks	free agency (1977-08-17)
Peter Marsh	Montreal Canadiens	to complete trade that sent Pierre Larouche to Canadiens (1977-12-15)

== Draft picks ==
The 1977 NHL amateur draft was held in Montreal.

Round	#	Player	Pos	Nationality	College/Junior/Club team (League)
2	30	James Hamilton	Right wing	Canada	London Knights (OHA)
3	48	Kim Davis	Center	Canada	Flin Flon Bombers (WCHL)
4	66	Mark Johnson	Center	United States	U. of Wisconsin (NCAA)
6	102	Gregory Millen	Goaltender	Canada	Peterborough Petes (OHA)
