= Jeff Allan =

Canadian ice hockey player

- Born: May 17, 1957 (age 68) Toronto, Ontario, Canada
- Height: 6 ft 2 in (188 cm)
- Weight: 200 lb (91 kg; 14 st 4 lb)
- Position: Defence
- Shot: Left
- Played for: Cincinnati Stingers; Cleveland Barons
- NHL draft: 95th overall, 1977; Cleveland Barons
- WHA draft: 36th overall, 1977; Cincinnati Stingers
- Playing career: 1977–1980

Jeff Allan sometimes spelled Jeff Allen (born May 17, 1957) is a Canadian former professional ice hockey defenceman who played four games in the National Hockey League for the Cleveland Barons. He would also play two games in the World Hockey Association with the Cincinnati Stingers. As a youth, he played in the 1970 Quebec International Pee-Wee Hockey Tournament with the Toronto Young Nationals minor ice hockey team.

== Career statistics ==
			Regular season					Playoffs
Season	Team	League	GP	G	A	Pts	PIM	GP	G	A	Pts	PIM
1974–75	Cornwall Royals	QMJHL	71	10	30	40	88	4	0	1	1	4
1975–76	Cornwall Royals	QMJHL	17	5	8	13	40	—	—	—	—	—
1975–76	Peterborough Petes	QMJHL	43	1	8	9	47	—	—	—	—	—
1976–77	Hull Olympiques	QMJHL	68	15	33	48	81	4	1	2	3	0
1977–78	Phoenix Roadrunners	CHL	6	0	0	0	2	—	—	—	—	—
1977–78	Hampton Gulls	AHL	8	0	0	0	0	—	—	—	—	—
1977–78	Cincinnati Stingers	WHA	2	0	0	0	0	—	—	—	—	—
1977–78	Cleveland Barons	NHL	4	0	0	0	2	—	—	—	—	—
1977–78	Toledo Goaldiggers	IHL	44	7	20	27	89	17	2	2	4	20
1978–79	Toledo Goaldiggers	IHL	3	0	0	0	11	—	—	—	—	—
1978–79	Los Angeles Blades	PHL	19	6	5	11	100	—	—	—	—	—
WHA totals			2	0	0	0	0	—	—	—	—	—
NHL totals			4	0	0	0	2	—	—	—	—	—
