= William Greene (dean of Achonry) =

William Greene (died 13 January 1843) was Dean of Achonry from 1821 until 1824 when he became the Rector of Ahoghill.

Church of Ireland titles
Preceded by Arthur Henry Kenney	Dean of Achonry; 1812–1821	Succeeded by Theophilus Blakely
