= Brian Moller =

Irish dean (1935–2021)

George Brian Moller (1935 – 14 January 2021) was an Anglican priest who was Dean of Connor from 1998 until 2001.

Born in 1935, he was educated at Trinity College Dublin and ordained deacon in 1961 and priest in 1962. After curacies at St Peter's Church, Belfast (1961–64) and Larne (1964–68) he was Curate-in-Charge (1968–69) and Rector (1969–86) at Rathcoole then Rector of St Bartholomew's, Belfast (1986–2001). Simultaneously with those positions, he was also Chaplain of Stranmillis University College (1988–2001), Prebendary of Christ Church Cathedral, Lisburn (1990–96) and Dean of Connor (1998–2001).

He died in 2021, aged 85.

Church of Ireland titles
Preceded by Frederick John Rusk	Dean of Connor; 1998–2001	Succeeded by John Frederick Augustus Bond
