= Theophilus Blakely =

Theophilus Blakely was an Irish Anglican priest.

Blakely was educated at Trinity College, Dublin. he was Dean of Connor from 1811 to 1824; Dean of Achonry from 1824 to 1839; and Dean of Down from then until his death on 1 December 1855.

Church of Ireland titles
Preceded by Thomas Graves	Dean of Connor; 1811–1824	Succeeded by Henry Leslie
Preceded by William Greene	Dean of Achonry; 1824–1839	Succeeded by Edward Newenham Hoare
Preceded by Thomas Span Plunket	Dean of Down; 1839–1855	Succeeded by Thomas Best Woodward
