= John Baby =

Canadian ice hockey player

- Born: May 18, 1957 (age 68) Sudbury, Ontario, Canada
- Height: 6 ft 0 in (183 cm)
- Weight: 195 lb (88 kg; 13 st 13 lb)
- Position: Defence
- Shot: Right
- Played for: Cleveland Barons; Minnesota North Stars
- NHL draft: 59th overall, 1977; Cleveland Barons
- WHA draft: 23rd overall, 1977; New England Whalers
- Playing career: 1977–1984

John George Baby (born May 18, 1957) is a Canadian former professional ice hockey defenceman who played two seasons in the National Hockey League for the Cleveland Barons and Minnesota North Stars between 1977 and 1979.

Baby was born in Sudbury, Ontario.

== Career statistics ==
=== Regular season and playoffs ===
| | | | Regular season | | | | | Playoffs |
| Season | Team | League | GP | G | A | Pts | PIM | GP | G | A | Pts | PIM |
|---|---|---|---|---|---|---|---|---|---|---|---|---|
| 1971–72 | Sudbury Wolves U15 | NOHL U15 | — | — | — | — | — | — | — | — | — | — |
| 1973–74 | North Bay Trappers | OPJAHL | 36 | 8 | 21 | 29 | 109 | — | — | — | — | — |
| 1974–75 | Kitchener Rangers | OMJHL | 70 | 13 | 26 | 39 | 112 | — | — | — | — | — |
| 1975–76 | Kitchener Rangers | OMJHL | 3 | 0 | 0 | 0 | 0 | — | — | — | — | — |
| 1975–76 | Sudbury Wolves | OMJHL | 61 | 16 | 34 | 50 | 155 | 17 | 6 | 8 | 14 | 32 |
| 1976–77 | Sudbury Wolves | OMJHL | 61 | 32 | 61 | 93 | 118 | 6 | 0 | 2 | 2 | 14 |
| 1977–78 | Cleveland Barons | NHL | 24 | 2 | 7 | 9 | 26 | — | — | — | — | — |
| 1977–78 | Binghamton Dusters | AHL | 25 | 3 | 1 | 4 | 16 | — | — | — | — | — |
| 1977–78 | Phoenix Roadrunners | CHL | 16 | 3 | 3 | 6 | 25 | — | — | — | — | — |
| 1978–79 | Minnesota North Stars | NHL | 2 | 0 | 1 | 1 | 0 | — | — | — | — | — |
| 1978–79 | Oklahoma City Stars | CHL | 76 | 18 | 22 | 40 | 114 | — | — | — | — | — |
| 1979–80 | Syracuse Firebirds | AHL | 73 | 3 | 24 | 27 | 73 | — | — | — | — | — |
| 1980–81 | Binghamton Whalers | AHL | 66 | 9 | 25 | 34 | 80 | 2 | 0 | 0 | 0 | 2 |
| 1981–82 | SC Rapperswil-Jona | NLA | — | — | — | — | — | — | — | — | — | — |
| 1983–84 | Kalamazoo Wings | IHL | 46 | 2 | 14 | 16 | 35 | 3 | 0 | 0 | 0 | 4 |
| NHL totals | | | 26 | 2 | 8 | 10 | 26 | — | — | — | — | — |
