= Fairs (surname) =

Fairs is a surname. Notable people with the surname include:

- Caroline Fairs (born 1983), Australian female rugby union player and army officer
- Eric Fairs (born 1964), American football player
- Henry Fairs (born 1976), English organist
- Marcus Fairs (1967–2022), British editor
- Nigel Fairs (born 20th century), British actor and writer
- Rob Fairs, Australian politician

== See also ==
- Fair (surname)
- Fair (disambiguation)
- Faires (surname)
