= Dan Chicoine =

Canadian ice hockey player

- Born: November 30, 1957 (age 68) Sherbrooke, Quebec, Canada
- Height: 5 ft 11 in (180 cm)
- Weight: 192 lb (87 kg; 13 st 10 lb)
- Position: Right wing
- Shot: Right
- Played for: Cleveland Barons; Minnesota North Stars
- NHL draft: 23rd overall, 1977; Cleveland Barons
- WHA draft: 81st overall, 1977; Quebec Nordiques
- Playing career: 1977–1983

Daniel Chicoine (born November 30, 1957) is a Canadian former professional ice hockey forward who played 31 games in the National Hockey League for the Cleveland Barons and Minnesota North Stars between 1977 and 1980.

== Career statistics ==
=== Regular season and playoffs ===
			Regular season					Playoffs
Season	Team	League	GP	G	A	Pts	PIM	GP	G	A	Pts	PIM
1973–74	Sherbrooke Castors	QMJHL	64	8	18	26	43	5	0	0	0	5
1974–75	Sherbrooke Castors	QMJHL	56	14	37	51	41	13	3	7	10	22
1974–75	Sherbrooke Castors	M-Cup	—	—	—	—	—	3	0	0	0	2
1975–76	Sherbrooke Castors	QMJHL	67	44	47	91	81	17	13	10	23	23
1976–77	Sherbrooke Castors	QMJHL	67	46	44	90	120	18	7	8	15	30
1976–77	Sherbrooke Castors	M-Cup	—	—	—	—	—	4	1	0	1	6
1977–78	Phoenix Roadrunners	CHL	17	2	7	9	24	—	—	—	—	—
1977–78	New Haven Nighthawks	AHL	41	5	11	16	33	14	1	3	4	16
1977–78	Cleveland Barons	NHL	6	0	0	0	0	—	—	—	—	—
1978–79	Oklahoma City Stars	CHL	60	26	22	48	53	—	—	—	—	—
1978–79	Minnesota North Stars	NHL	1	0	0	0	0	—	—	—	—	—
1979–80	Oklahoma City Stars	CHL	26	2	12	14	21	—	—	—	—	—
1979–80	Minnesota North Stars	NHL	24	1	2	3	12	1	0	0	0	0
1980–81	Oklahoma City Stars	CHL	31	5	12	17	31	3	1	0	1	4
1982–83	Sherbrooke Jets	AHL	21	2	4	6	26	—	—	—	—	—
NHL totals			31	1	2	3	12	1	0	0	0	0

=== International ===
Year	Team	Event	GP	G	A	Pts	PIM
1976	Canada	WJC	4	2	0	2	2
Junior totals			4	2	0	2	2
