= Martin Baxter =

Martin Baxter was an Irish Anglican priest.

Baxter was born in County Meath and educated at Trinity College, Dublin. He was Dean of Connor from 1704 to 1709.
