= Norman Barr (priest) =

William Norman Cochrane Barr
- Dean of Connor
- Church: Church of Ireland
- Diocese: Diocese of Connor
- Installed: 1981
- Term ended: 1990
- Predecessor: Gilbert Wilson
- Successor: Lex Fair

Orders
- Ordination: 1946

Personal details
- Born: 1920
- Died: 19 November, 2010 (aged 89–90)
- Education: Trinity College, Dublin

William Norman Cochrane Barr (1920-November 19, 2010) was Dean of Connor from 1981 to 1990.

Born in 1920, he was educated at Trinity College, Dublin and ordained in 1946. After curacies in Ballymena and Belfast he held incumbencies in Duneane, Whiterock and Derriaghy before his appointment as Dean.

Church of Ireland titles
Preceded by William Gilbert Wilson	Dean of Connor; 1981–1990	Succeeded by James Alexander Fair
