= Barbara Trader Faires =

Mathematician

Barbara Trader Faires (born 1943) is an American mathematician who served as professor, department chair, and Vice President for Academic Affairs at Westminster College in Pennsylvania and served for 8 years as Secretary of the Mathematical Association of America (MAA). She received the Yueh-Gin Gung and Dr. Charles Y. Hu Award for Distinguished Service to Mathematics from the MAA in 2022. She is now retired and living in Pulaski Township, Pennsylvania.

Faires earned her undergraduate degree at East Carolina University, double-majoring in mathematics and business. She earned her doctorate at Kent State University in 1974; her dissertation title was "On Grothendieck Spaces and Vector Measures" and completed under the supervision of Joseph Diestel. Faires extended her studies into computer science during a sabbatical leave at Carnegie Mellon University where she also had a visiting position. Another visiting position took her to Westminster College in Oxford, UK.

She was married to mathematician J. Douglas Faires (1941-2012) who taught at nearby Youngstown University in Youngstown, Ohio. Together they authored several calculus textbooks.

== Selected publications ==
- Faires, Barbara (1974). "On Vitali–Hahn–Saks Type Theorems" (PDF). Bulletin of the American Mathematical Society. 80 (4): 670–74. doi:10.1090/s0002-9904-1974-13541-x.
- Faires, Barbara. (1978) "Varieties and Vector Measures". Mathematische Nachrichten, 85 (1), https://doi.org/10.1002/mana.19780850122.
