= John Bond (priest) =

Irish Anglican priest, born 1945

John Frederick Augustus Bond
- Dean of Connor
- Church: Church of Ireland
- Diocese: Diocese of Connor
- Installed: 2001
- Term ended: 2016
- Predecessor: Brian Moller
- Successor: Sam Wright

Orders
- Ordination: 1967

Personal details
- Born: 1945 (age 80–81)
- Education: Trinity College Dublin

John Frederick Augustus Bond was Dean of Connor from 2001 until 2016.

Born in 1945 he was educated at Trinity College Dublin and ordained in 1967. After curacies in Lisburn and Finaghy he held incumbencies in Ballynure and Skerry, Rathcavan and Newtowncrommelin. He was Precentor of Christ Church Cathedral, Lisburn from 1998 until his appointment as Dean.

Church of Ireland titles
Preceded by George Brian Moller	Dean of Connor; 2001–2016	Succeeded by Sam Wright
