= Reg Kerr =

Canadian ice hockey player

- Born: October 16, 1957 (age 67); Oxbow, Saskatchewan, Canada
- Height: 5 ft 10 in (178 cm)
- Weight: 179 lb (81 kg; 12 st 11 lb)
- Position: Left Wing
- Shot: Left
- Played for: Cleveland Barons; Chicago Black Hawks; Edmonton Oilers
- NHL draft: 41st overall, 1977; Cleveland Barons
- WHA draft: 39th overall, 1977; Houston Aeros
- Playing career: 1977–1984

Reginald John Kerr (born October 16, 1957) is a Canadian former professional ice hockey player. He played in the National Hockey League with the Cleveland Barons, Chicago Black Hawks, and Edmonton Oilers between 1977 and 1984.

== Playing career ==
Born in Oxbow, Saskatchewan, Kerr was drafted in the third round, 41st overall in the 1977 NHL Amateur Draft by the Cleveland Barons, but only played seven games for the Barons before he was traded to the Chicago Black Hawks for Randy Holt. Kerr spent five seasons with the Black Hawks and scored a career-high 30 goals and 30 assists during the 1980–81 season. He left in 1982 and spent a season in the American Hockey League for the Springfield Indians before signing with the Edmonton Oilers, but he was assigned back to the AHL with the Moncton Alpines and played just three games for the Oilers. Kerr departed at the end of the season and retired.

In total, Kerr played 263 NHL games, scoring 66 goals and 94 assists for 160 points.

== Post-playing career ==
Kerr now lives in the Chicago area, and is President of R.J.Kerr, Inc., an office furniture company. He is also the vice president of the Blackhawk Alumni Association. In 2016, he and his wife, Teresa, sold their home in Northfield, Illinois.

== Career statistics ==
=== Regular season and playoffs ===
			Regular season					Playoffs
Season	Team	League	GP	G	A	Pts	PIM	GP	G	A	Pts	PIM
1973–74	Penticton Broncos	BCJHL	60	15	36	51	130	—	—	—	—	—
1974–75	Kamloops Chiefs	WCHL	70	28	57	85	87	6	1	7	8	9
1975–76	Kamloops Chiefs	WCHL	70	23	58	81	147	12	6	11	17	18
1976–77	Kamloops Chiefs	WCHL	72	47	54	101	172	5	2	2	4	16
1977–78	Phoenix Roadrunners	CHL	11	4	1	5	15	—	—	—	—	—
1977–78	Dallas Black Hawks	CHL	55	20	21	41	40	13	1	2	3	20
1977–78	Cleveland Barons	NHL	7	0	2	2	7	—	—	—	—	—
1977–78	Chicago Blackhawks	NHL	2	0	2	2	0	—	—	—	—	—
1978–79	Chicago Blackhawks	NHL	73	16	24	40	50	4	1	0	1	5
1979–80	Chicago Blackhawks	NHL	49	9	8	17	17	—	—	—	—	—
1980–81	Chicago Blackhawks	NHL	70	30	30	60	56	3	0	0	0	2
1981–82	Chicago Blackhawks	NHL	59	11	28	39	39	—	—	—	—	—
1982–83	Springfield Indians	AHL	45	7	18	25	13	—	—	—	—	—
1983–84	Moncton Alpines	AHL	63	13	29	42	43	—	—	—	—	—
1983–84	Edmonton Oilers	NHL	3	0	0	0	0	—	—	—	—	—
NHL totals			263	66	94	160	169	7	1	0	1	7

== Awards ==
- WCHL First All-Star Team – 1977
