= Dean of Connor =

Dean of Church of Ireland diocese

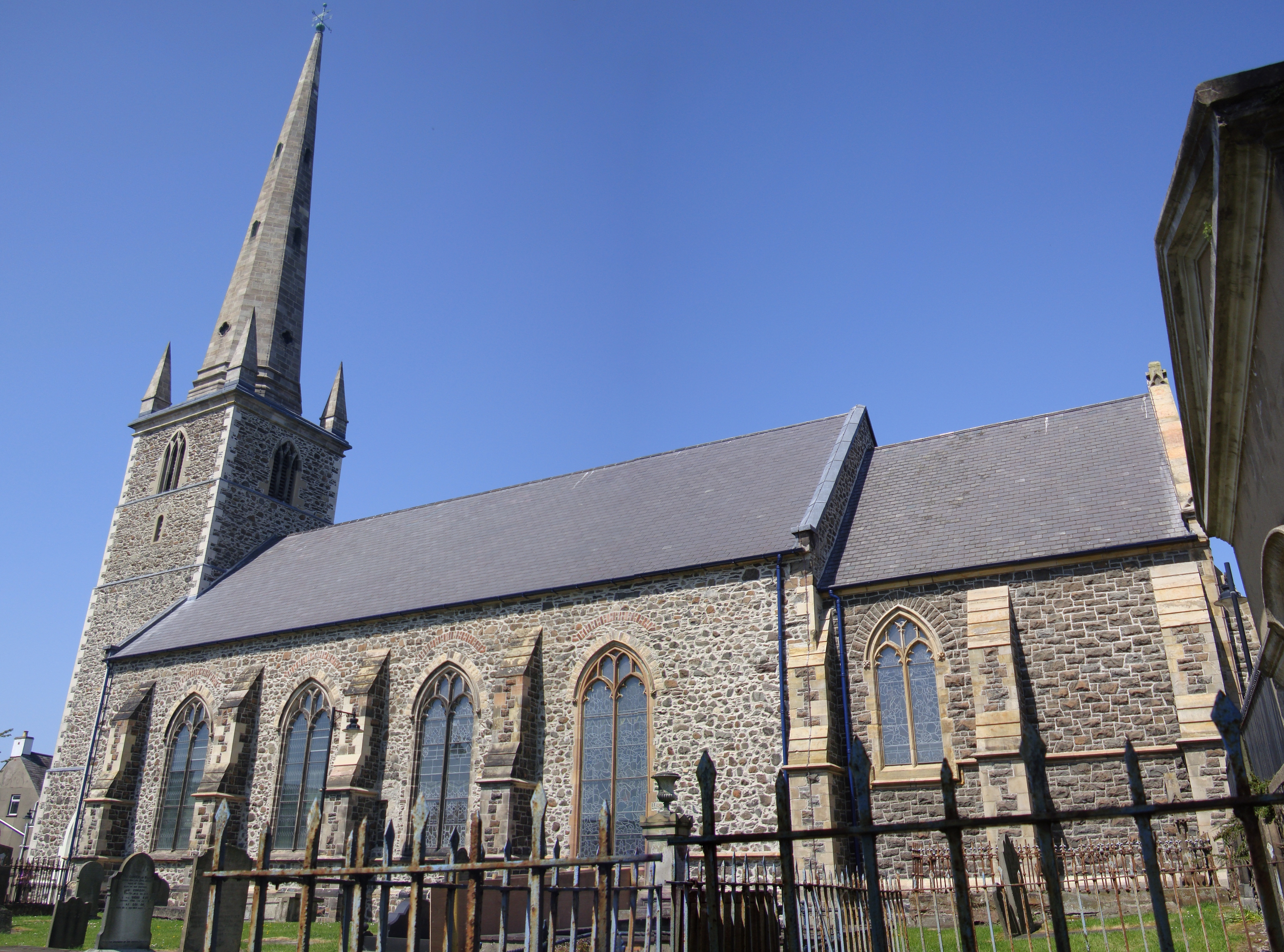
Christ Church Cathedral, Lisburn

The Dean of Connor is based at Christ Church Cathedral, Lisburn in the Diocese of Connor (Church of Ireland) within the Church of Ireland. The chapter is however known as the Chapter of St Saviours, Connor after the previous (prior to 1662) cathedral church in Connor.

The current incumbent is the Very Reverend Sam Wright.

== List of deans ==
- 1609–1615 Milo Whale (first dean)
- 1615 Robert Openshawe
- 1628 Richard Shuckburgh
- 1640–1661 Robert Price (afterwards Bishop of Ferns, 1661)
- 1660/1–1662 Francis Marsh (afterwards Dean of Armagh, 1662 and later Bishop of Limerick, Ardfert and Aghadoe, 1667)
- 1661–1667 George Rust (afterwards Bishop of Dromore, 1667)
- 1667–1679 Patrick Sheridan (afterwards Bishop of Cloyne, 1679)
- 1679–1694 Thomas Ward (deprived for immoral conduct, 1694)
- 1694–1704 George Walter Story (afterwards Dean of Limerick, 1704)
- 1704–?1709 Martin Baxter
- 1709/10–1738 Eugene (or Owen) Lloyd
- 1739–1743 George Cuppage
- 1743–1753 John Walsh
- 1753–1775 Hill Benson
- 1775–1802 Richard Dobbs
- 1802–1811 Thomas Graves
- 1811–1824 Theophilus Blakely (afterwards Dean of Achonry, 1811)
- 1825–1838 Henry Leslie
- 1839–1855 John Chaine
- 1855–?1888 George Bull
- 1888–1893 John Walton Murray
- 1893–1907 Charles Seaver
- 1907–1908 Walter Riddall
- 1908–1910 John Bristow
- 1910–?1931 William Dowse
- 1932–?1945 Maurice Henry Fitzgerald Collis
- 1945–1956 John William Cooke
- 1956–1963 Richard Simons Breen
- 1963–1976 Richard Adams
- 1976–1981 William Gilbert Wilson (afterwards Bishop of Kilmore, Elphin and Ardagh, 1981)
- 1981–1990 William Norman Cochrane Barr
- 1990–1995 James Alexander Fair
- 1995–1995 Frederick Rusk
- 1998–2001 Brian Moller
- 2001–2016 John Frederick Augustus Bond
- 2016–present Sam Wright
