= Joseph Diestel =

American mathematician (1943–2017)

- Born: January 27, 1943
- Died: August 17, 2017 (aged 74)
- Occupation(s): Mathematician, professor
- Employer: Kent State University
- Known for: Studying functional analysis, writing several textbooks

Joseph Diestel (January 27, 1943 – August 17, 2017) was an American mathematician and Professor of Mathematics at Kent State University. In addition to his contribution to functional analysis, particularly Banach space theory and the theory of vector measures, Diestel was known for a number of highly influential textbooks: in 1975 he published "Lecture Notes Geometry of Banach Spaces—Selected Topics"; in 1977, he published "Vector Measures" with J. Jerry Uhl; in 1984, published "Sequences and series in Banach spaces" and in 1995 he published "Absolutely summing operators" with H. Jarchow and A. Tonge; as well as a number of other books.

Diestel received his Ph.D. degree in 1969 from Catholic University of America under Victor Michael Bogdan. He had 29 graduate students and over 46 mathematical descendants.
