= Hill Benson =

Irish Anglican priest

- Dean of Connor
- Church: Church of Ireland
- Diocese: Diocese of Connor
- Installed: 1753
- Term ended: 1775
- Predecessor: John Walsh
- Successor: Richard Dobbs

Personal details
- Born: 1705
- Died: 1775 (aged 69–70)
- Education: Trinity College Dublin

Hill Benson (1705-1775) was an Irish Anglican priest in the eighteenth century.

Benson was born in Dublin and educated at Trinity College, Dublin. He was Dean of Connor from 1753 until his death.
