= Lex Fair =

James Alexander Fair
- Dean of Connor
- Church: Church of Ireland
- Diocese: Diocese of Connor

Orders
- Ordination: 1950

Personal details
- Born: 1926
- Died: 1995 (aged 68–69)
- Education: Trinity College, Dublin

James Alexander (Lex) Fair (1926–1995 ) was Dean of Connor from 1990 until 1995.

Born in 1926 he was educated at Trinity College, Dublin and ordained in 1950. After curacies in Monaghan and Portadown he was the incumbent at Magherafelt, then Dean's Vicar of St Anne's Cathedral, Belfast.

Church of Ireland titles
Preceded by William Norman Cochrane Barr	Dean of Connor; 1995–1998	Succeeded by Frederick John Rusk
