= Jim Pettie =

Canadian ice hockey player (1953–2019)

- Born: October 24, 1953; Toronto, Ontario, Canada
- Died: August 31, 2019 (aged 65); Rochester, New York, U.S.
- Height: 6 ft 0 in (183 cm)
- Weight: 195 lb (88 kg; 13 st 13 lb)
- Position: Goaltender
- Caught: Left
- Played for: Boston Bruins
- NHL draft: 142nd overall, 1973; Boston Bruins
- Playing career: 1973–1981

James "Seaweed" Pettie (October 24, 1953 – August 31, 2019) was a Canadian professional ice hockey goaltender who played 21 games in the National Hockey League (NHL) with the Boston Bruins between 1976 and 1979.

Pettie was born in Toronto, Ontario.

As a youth, he played in the 1965 and 1966 Quebec International Pee-Wee Hockey Tournaments with a minor ice hockey team from Toronto.

Pettie died in Rochester, New York, on August 31, 2019, at the age of 65, due to cancer.

== Career statistics ==
=== Regular season and playoffs ===
			Regular season									Playoffs
Season	Team	League	GP	W	L	T	MIN	GA	SO	GAA	SV%	GP	W	L	MIN	GA	SO	GAA	SV%
1972–73	St. Catharines Black Hawks	OHA	31	—	—	—	1089	152	1	5.04	—	—	—	—	—	—	—	—	—
1973–74	Dayton Gems	IHL	40	—	—	—	2092	96	1	2.75	—	4	1	3	197	15	0	4.57	—
1974–75	Dayton Gems	IHL	27	—	—	—	1310	73	0	3.34	—	13	6	7	197	30	0	2.82	—
1975–76	Dayton Gems	IHL	51	—	—	—	2178	104	5	2.86	—	15	12	3	921	43	1	2.80	—
1975–76	Broome Dusters	NAHL	5	—	—	—	260	16	1	3.69	—	—	—	—	—	—	—	—	—
1976–77	Boston Bruins	NHL	1	1	0	1	60	3	0	3.00	.900	—	—	—	—	—	—	—	—
1976–77	Rochester Americans	AHL	43	26	15	1	2462	131	2	3.19	—	11	6	5	660	36	0	3.27	—
1977–78	Boston Bruins	NHL	1	0	1	0	60	6	0	6.00	.769	—	—	—	—	—	—	—	—
1977–78	Rochester Americans	AHL	32	16	12	4	1897	107	2	3.38	—	3	0	3	188	8	0	2.55	—
1978–79	Boston Bruins	NHL	19	8	6	2	1037	62	1	3.59	.856	—	—	—	—	—	—	—	—
1978–79	Rochester Americans	AHL	9	0	7	1	451	39	0	5.19	—	—	—	—	—	—	—	—	—
1979–80	New Haven Nighthawks	AHL	33	16	13	3	1975	131	2	4.00	—	2	1	1	120	11	0	5.00	—
1980–81	Birmingham Bulls	CHL	21	—	—	—	1189	109	0	5.50	—	—	—	—	—	—	—	—	—
1980–81	Richmond Rifles	EHL	1	0	1	0	62	7	0	6.77	—	—	—	—	—	—	—	—	—
NHL totals			21	9	7	2	1157	71	1	3.68	.855	—	—	—	—	—	—	—	—
