= Joseph Fair =

American virologist

- Education: Tulane University, Loyola University
- Scientific career
- Fields: Virology
- Workplaces: Metabiota, Inc., NBC

Joseph Fair is a virologist and former vice president and director of research and development for Metabiota, Inc. Since March 2020 he has been a science contributor for the American television network NBC.

== Education ==
After briefly attending the University of Kentucky, Fair received his bachelor's degree in biology from Loyola University New Orleans, and his M.P.H. and Ph.D. in molecular biology from Tulane University.

== Work ==
Fair is known for his work with hemorrhagic fevers notably Ebola and Lassa fever (LHF), as well as the tracking and biosurveillance of infectious diseases.

From April 2008 to April 2014, Fair was a corporate vice-president at Metabiota, Inc. (formerly Global Viral Forecasting, Inc.). He then worked as a consulting advisor to Fondation Mérieux. From 2015 to 2017 he was a chief adviser in Global Health Surveillance & Diagnostics for MRIGlobal and a senior fellow in global health security at Pennsylvania State University. In 2018 he worked with International Medical Corps. Since January 2018 he has been a senior fellow at the Scowcroft Institute of International Affairs at the Bush School of Government and Public Service, Texas A&M University.

In 2020, Fair was hospitalized with COVID-19-like symptoms shortly after taking a crowded flight, despite wearing a mask and gloves, and theorized that he caught the virus via his eyes as a result of not wearing goggles. Later PCR and antibody testing, however, revealed Fair did not have COVID; the cause of his illness remains unknown.
