= Jonny Fair =

American jazz musician

Jonny Fair is an American jazz/folk singer/crooner, musician, actor and composer. Fair composed and performed the music and acted in the 2007 motion picture Gordon Glass starring Omar Benson Miller. Fair also acted as the sidewalk cafe Maitre D' in the opening sequence of the 2002 motion picture Collateral Damage starring Arnold Schwarzenegger and as the post match reporter in the 2001 made-for-TV movie When Billie Beat Bobby starring Ron Silver.

Performing and recording with his band The Xtrordinaires as the lead vocalist, chromatic harmonica player and band leader in a style of music that Fair calls Southern Swing, Jules Fox, author of the NY Times Best Seller The Melody Lingers On... Scenes From The Golden Era Of West Coast Jazz compares Fair to friends and clients Nat King Cole, Ella Fitzgerald, Dinah Washington, Sarah Vaughan, Sammy Davis Jr., Count Basie, Duke Ellington, Lionel Hampton, Billy Eckstine, Dorothy Dandridge, Tommy Dorsey and Perry Como in terms of sheer talent writing, I've seen many, many stars born and 'The Sender of Song' Jonny Fair, Mr. Xtrordinaire is without a doubt destined for greatness. Born in Thayer, Missouri, Fair records for Blue Tone Records, the jazz subsidiary label of Arlington Records.
