= Owen Lloyd (priest) =

Irish Anglican priest

Owen LLoyd (1664–1743) was an Irish Anglican priest.

Lloyd was born in County Louth and educated at Trinity College, Dublin. He received the degree of Doctor of Divinity (DD). He became a Fellow of Trinity College in 1685 and Regius Professor of Divinity there in 1699. Lloyd was Dean of Connor from 1709 until his death.
