= George Rust (bishop) =

English Anglican academic and churchman

George Rust (died 1670) was an English Anglican academic and churchman, who became bishop of Dromore in 1667. He is known as a Cambridge Platonist and associate of Jeremy Taylor.

== Life ==
He was a native of Cambridge, where he graduated B.A. from St Catharine's Hall early in 1647. He became a fellow of Christ's College in 1649, and proceeded M.A. in 1650. He belonged to the Cambridge Platonist school; among his friends at Christ's were Sir John Finch and Henry More. He was also close to Joseph Glanvill.

Rust gave up his fellowship in 1659. Soon after the Restoration of 1660, he was invited to Ireland by Jeremy Taylor, ordained deacon and priest on 7 May 1661, and made dean of Connor in August. In 1662 he was presented by the crown to the rectory of Island Magee.

On 20 October 1663, preaching at Newtownards at the funeral of Hugh Montgomery, 1st Earl of Mount Alexander, Rust remarked, "New presbyter is but old priest writ large"; John Milton's sonnet containing the same line was not published till 1673. In 1664 he was rector of Lisburn, where Edward Conway, 1st Earl of Conway lived. In 1665 he visited Conway in England, when Valentine Greatrakes was trying to cure Lady Conway's headaches.

Jeremy Taylor died at Lisburn on 13 August 1667, and Rust preached a well-known funeral sermon. In succession to Taylor, Rust was appointed bishop of Dromore by patent in November 1667, and consecrated in Christ Church, Dublin, on 15 December. He died of fever in the prime of life in December 1670, and was buried in the choir of Dromore Cathedral in the same vault with his friend Taylor.

== Works ==
In 1655 Rust delivered a Latin discourse in Great St. Mary's, Cambridge, in answer to Pontius Pilate's question "What is Truth?" At the commencement of 1658 he maintained in the same place the thesis that scripture teaches the resurrection of the body, and that reason does not refute it. Rust said he had studied all creeds, and preferred the Church of England. His works are:

- A Letter of Resolution concerning Origen, London, 1661. This work defends the doctrine of pre-existence of Origen, and was censured by Theophilus Dillingham. It also touched on apocatastasis.
- Sermon on ii. Tim. i. 10, preached at Newtown, 20 Oct. 1663, at the Funeral of Hugh, earl of Mount Alexander, Dublin, 1664.
- Sermon at Jeremy Taylor's Funeral, Dublin, 1667; many later editions. It was included by Reginald Heber in vol. i. of Taylor's Works.
- A Discourse of Truth, London, 1677; another edition, with notes and a preface by Joseph Glanvill, was published by James Collins, London, 1682. This is not identical with Rust's discourse delivered at Cambridge in 1655.
- A Discourse of the Use of Reason in Matters of Religion, showing that Christianity contains nothing repugnant to Right Reason, against Enthusiasts and Deists, London, 1683; the Latin original edited by Henry Hallywell, with a translation, notes, and a dedication to Henry More.
- Remains, edited by Henry Hallywell and dedicated to his diocesan John Lake, London, 1686.

Glanvill said that Rust gave a new turn to Cambridge studies, going back to "primitive learning and theology". Hallywell wrote that he was familiar with Kabbalah.

== Notes ==
Attribution

- This article incorporates text from a publication now in the public domain: Lee, Sidney, ed. (1897). "Rust, George". Dictionary of National Biography. Vol. 50. London: Smith, Elder & Co.
