= W. B. Fair =

Performer

William Burnham Fair (15 December 1850 – 22 July 1909) was an English music hall performer.

Born in St Pancras, London, he left his family at the age of 15 and travelled to Manchester, where he was a call boy at the Queen's Theatre. He then worked as a comic actor in Manchester for seven years, before returning to London.

He performed in Stepney, and then in pantomime in 1873 at the Surrey Music Hall. Two years later, he appeared in a pantomime written for him by Alfred Lee and Frank Green, and performed the song "Tommy, Make Room for Your Uncle", written by T. S. Lonsdale. The song became hugely popular in 1876, and Fair performed it regularly for several years, sometimes at six different venues each night. It was decried and parodied by Robert Browning, and, though Fair was regarded as "a vigorous and competent comic vocalist", it was his only significant success.

In 1878 Fair became the owner and Chairman at the Winchester Music Hall in Southwark, but lost money, and for a time he organised shows at Ramsgate. In 1887, Fair took over the Royal Music Hall, previously Weston's and later rebuilt as the Holborn Empire. However, these ventures were not successful, and in later years Fair worked as a theatrical agent and in the sawdust business, before finally being employed as an attendant at the London Coliseum.

He died in London in 1909, aged 58.
