= Gary Edwards (ice hockey) =

Canadian ice hockey player (born 1947)

- Born: October 5, 1947 (age 78) Toronto, Ontario, Canada
- Height: 5 ft 9 in (175 cm)
- Weight: 160 lb (73 kg; 11 st 6 lb)
- Position: Goaltender
- Caught: Left
- Played for: St. Louis Blues; Los Angeles Kings; Cleveland Barons; Minnesota North Stars; Edmonton Oilers; Pittsburgh Penguins
- NHL draft: 6th overall, 1968; St. Louis Blues
- Playing career: 1968–1982

Gary Edwards (born October 5, 1947) is a Canadian former professional ice hockey goaltender who played in the National Hockey League (NHL) from 1968 to 1982. He was selected by the St. Louis Blues in the 1968 NHL Amateur Draft and played for six teams during his career.

== Playing career ==
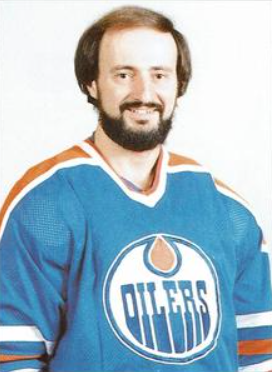
1980-81 photo of Edwards for Edmonton Oilers

Born in Toronto, Ontario, Edwards was drafted by the St. Louis Blues in the first round (6th overall) in the 1968 NHL Amateur Draft. Besides the Blues (1968–69 to 1969–70 and 1981–82), Edwards played for the Los Angeles Kings (1971–72 to 1976–77), Cleveland Barons/Minnesota North Stars (1976–77 to 1979–80), Edmonton Oilers (1980–81), and Pittsburgh Penguins (1981–82). From 1972 to 1976, he teamed with Rogatien Vachon to give the Los Angeles Kings one of the best goaltender tandems in the NHL. Edwards' best season was 1974-75 when he posted a 2.34 goals-against average in 27 games while backing up Vachon. They were a close runner-up for the 1975 Vezina Trophy (at the time given out to the goaltender(s) of the team that allowed the fewest goals during the regular season), losing out to Bernie Parent of the Stanley Cup champion Philadelphia Flyers by a mere four goals.

== Career statistics ==
=== Regular season and playoffs ===
| | | | Regular season | | | | | | | | | Playoffs |
| Season | Team | League | GP | W | L | T | MIN | GA | SO | GAA | SV% | GP | W | L | MIN | GA | SO | GAA | SV% |
|---|---|---|---|---|---|---|---|---|---|---|---|---|---|---|---|---|---|---|---|
| 1966–67 | Toronto Marlboros | OHA | 8 | — | — | — | 480 | 37 | 0 | 4.62 | — | — | — | — | — | — | — | — | — |
| 1967–68 | Toronto Marlboros | OHA | 38 | — | — | — | 2250 | 120 | 2 | 3.20 | — | 5 | — | — | 290 | 18 | 0 | 3.72 | — |
| 1968–69 | St. Louis Blues | NHL | 1 | 0 | 0 | 0 | 4 | 0 | 0 | 0.00 | 1.000 | — | — | — | — | — | — | — | — |
| 1968–69 | Kansas City Blues | CHL | 32 | — | — | — | 1760 | 92 | 4 | 3.00 | — | 4 | 1 | 3 | 240 | 18 | 0 | 4.50 | — |
| 1969–70 | St. Louis Blues | NHL | 1 | 0 | 1 | 0 | 60 | 4 | 0 | 4.00 | .871 | — | — | — | — | — | — | — | — |
| 1969–70 | Kansas City Blues | CHL | 34 | 11 | 17 | 6 | 2040 | 115 | 2 | 3.38 | — | — | — | — | — | — | — | — | — |
| 1969–70 | San Diego Gulls | WHL | 3 | 2 | 0 | 1 | 180 | 3 | 1 | 1.00 | .971 | — | — | — | — | — | — | — | — |
| 1970–71 | San Diego Gulls | WHL | 4 | 4 | 0 | 0 | 240 | 12 | 0 | 3.00 | .890 | — | — | — | — | — | — | — | — |
| 1970–71 | Kansas City Blues | CHL | 35 | — | — | — | 1980 | 85 | 2 | 2.58 | — | — | — | — | — | — | — | — | — |
| 1971–72 | Los Angeles Kings | NHL | 44 | 13 | 23 | 5 | 2503 | 150 | 2 | 3.60 | .898 | — | — | — | — | — | — | — | — |
| 1972–73 | Los Angeles Kings | NHL | 27 | 9 | 16 | 1 | 1560 | 94 | 1 | 3.62 | .877 | — | — | — | — | — | — | — | — |
| 1973–74 | Los Angeles Kings | NHL | 18 | 5 | 7 | 2 | 929 | 50 | 1 | 3.23 | .890 | 1 | 1 | 0 | 60 | 1 | 0 | 1.00 | .957 |
| 1974–75 | Los Angeles Kings | NHL | 27 | 15 | 3 | 8 | 1561 | 61 | 3 | 2.35 | .916 | — | — | — | — | — | — | — | — |
| 1975–76 | Los Angeles Kings | NHL | 29 | 12 | 13 | 4 | 1737 | 103 | 0 | 3.56 | .875 | 2 | 1 | 1 | 121 | 9 | 0 | 4.48 | .871 |
| 1976–77 | Los Angeles Kings | NHL | 10 | 0 | 6 | 2 | 498 | 39 | 0 | 4.70 | .852 | — | — | — | — | — | — | — | — |
| 1976–77 | Cleveland Barons | NHL | 17 | 4 | 10 | 3 | 999 | 68 | 2 | 4.09 | .876 | — | — | — | — | — | — | — | — |
| 1977–78 | Cleveland Barons | NHL | 30 | 6 | 18 | 5 | 1698 | 128 | 0 | 4.53 | .857 | — | — | — | — | — | — | — | — |
| 1978–79 | Minnesota North Stars | NHL | 25 | 6 | 11 | 5 | 1334 | 83 | 0 | 3.74 | .867 | — | — | — | — | — | — | — | — |
| 1979–80 | Minnesota North Stars | NHL | 25 | 9 | 7 | 10 | 1536 | 82 | 0 | 3.20 | .877 | 7 | 3 | 3 | 336 | 22 | 0 | 3.93 | .878 |
| 1980–81 | Edmonton Oilers | NHL | 15 | 5 | 3 | 4 | 728 | 44 | 0 | 3.63 | .865 | 1 | 0 | 0 | 20 | 2 | 0 | 6.00 | .667 |
| 1981–82 | St. Louis Blues | NHL | 10 | 1 | 5 | 1 | 480 | 45 | 0 | 5.63 | .819 | — | — | — | — | — | — | — | — |
| 1981–82 | Pittsburgh Penguins | NHL | 6 | 3 | 2 | 1 | 360 | 22 | 1 | 3.68 | .886 | — | — | — | — | — | — | — | — |
| NHL totals | | | 286 | 88 | 125 | 51 | 15,980 | 973 | 11 | 3.40 | .879 | 11 | 5 | 4 | 537 | 34 | 0 | 3.80 | .878 |

Awards and achievements
| Preceded by None | St. Louis Blues first-round draft pick 1968 | Succeeded by Gene Carr |
