= Jeff Fair =

American college football athletic trainer

Dr. Jeff Fair
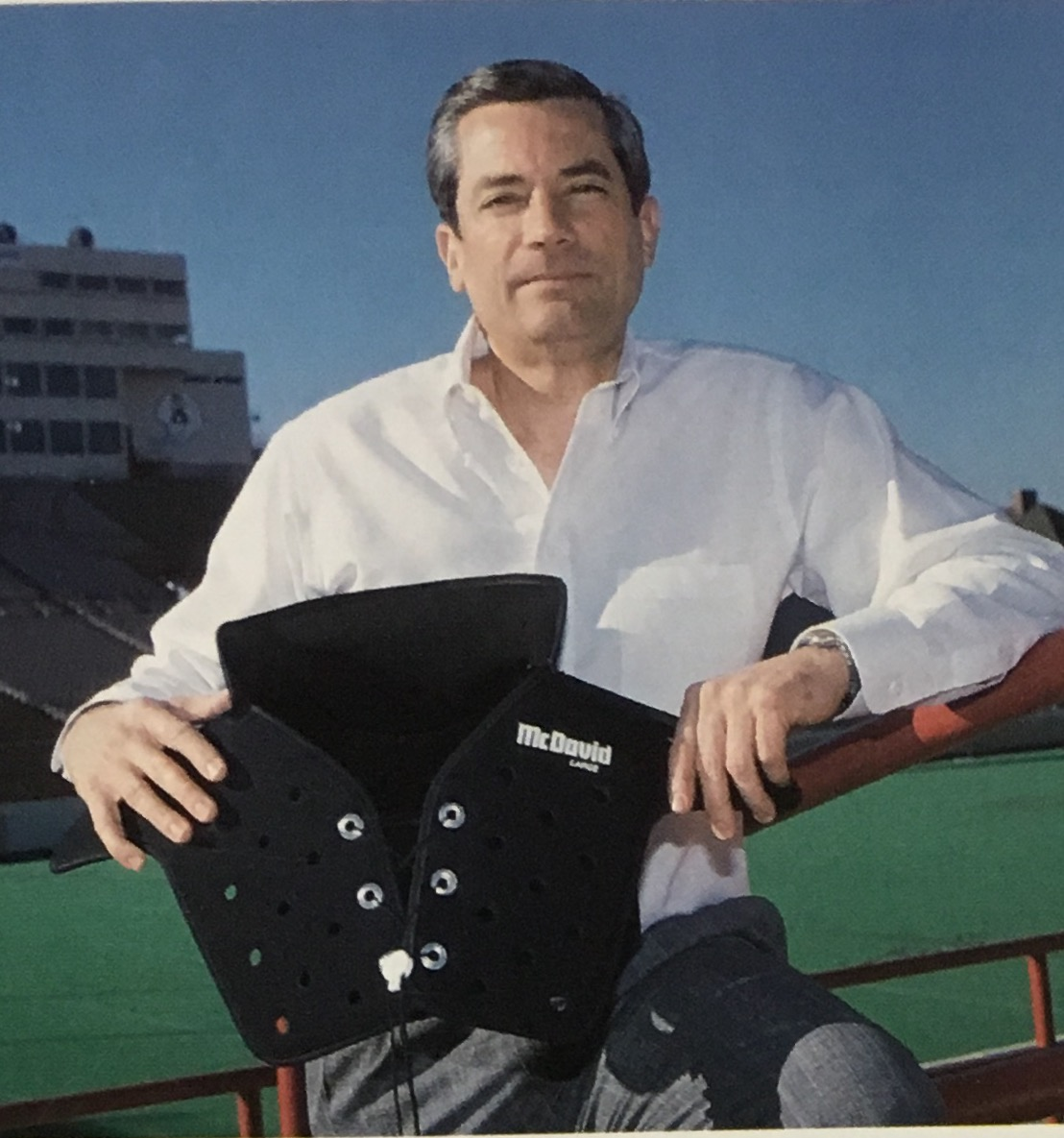
- Dr. Fair Jeff Fair while at OSU

Oklahoma State University & U.S. Naval Academy
- Athletic Trainer
- Born: April 6, 1947 (age 78); Lima, Ohio

Career statistics
- College Football Games Worked: 512

Jeffrey David Fair (born April 6, 1947) is a former college football athletic trainer. He was inducted into the Hall of Fame of the College of Education at Oklahoma State University in 2015, the Mid-America Athletic Trainers' Association Hall of Fame in 2002, and the Oklahoma Athletic Trainers' Association Hall of Fame, also in 2002. In 2015 Fair was recognized as an honorary member of the graduating class from the U.S. Naval Academy for his 18 years of dedicated service and selfless dedication to Naval Academy sports.

Fair holds patents on several inventions, including the "Cowboy Collar", "The Anchor", and "Sprained Ankle Orthoses", that have provided student and professional athletes added protection from injury.

== Early life ==
Jeff Fair was born in Lima, Ohio in 1947, to parents Stanley and Phyllis Fair. His father graduated from West Point therefore Fair followed his father living all over the United States. When Stanley was first posted to the Pentagon, Fair attended North Springfield Elementary in Virginia. It was also here that he met his best friend who loved football. Jeff was not big enough to play football, but wanted to be close to his friends. He took an athletic trainer’s course put out by Cramer’s. With this experience under his belt, he became the trainer for the football and basketball teams at Annandale High School in Virginia from 1961-1965.

Fair attended college at Kent State University from 1965-1971 where he earned a B.S. degree in Health, Physical Education and Recreation and worked as a Student Trainer. While at Kent he did an internship at the Cleveland, Ohio, V-A hospital and earned certification as a kinesiotherapist. He and his wife both were on the Kent State University campus during the Kent State Shootings. Fair gained employment as a campus officer who was ordered to take the flag which flew over campus. He later returned the flag to the University years later. He graduated and accepted a graduate assistantship at the University of North Dakota in Grand Forks. Jeff flew in a prop airplane when the basketball team traveled, and had a very cold season that year in football. When one of the football coaches left for Oklahoma State, he called and asked if Fair wanted to come to OSU as the football trainer.

== Athletic training career ==
=== Oklahoma State University ===
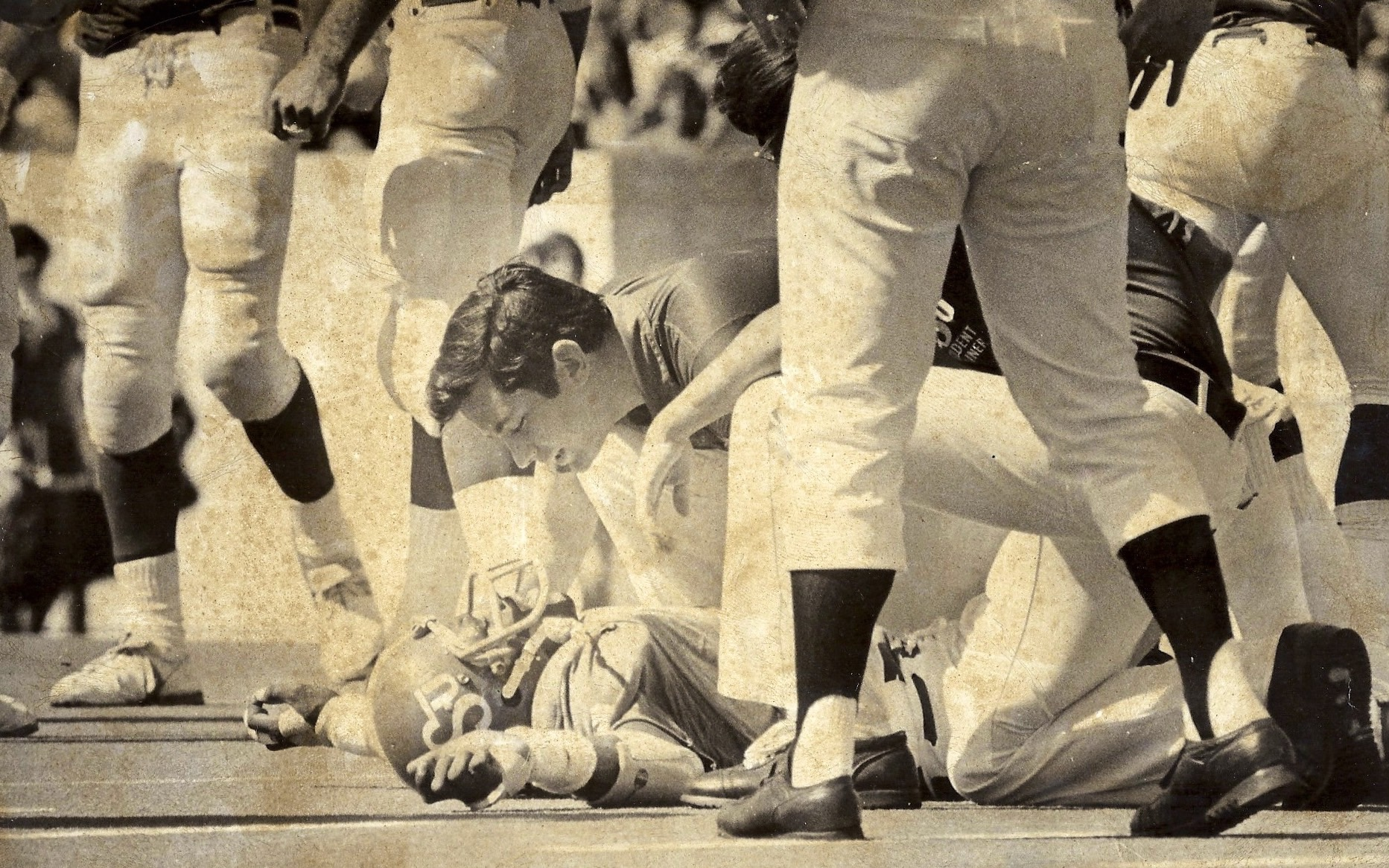
Dr. Fair checking on OSU player.

Fair received OSU’s Distinguished Service Award in 1986 for his service not only in athletic training, but also his service to high schools, and for teaching classes. He was awarded the Melvin Jones Award by the Stillwater Lions Club for his service to Lions and the community and in 1994 the National Association of Athletic Trainers awarded him the Most Distinguished Athletic Trainer Award. He was instrumental in helping write and encourage passage of the Oklahoma Licensure of Athletic Trainers. He served on the Oklahoma Board of Examiners as a member and as Chairman and he helped develop the Oklahoma State Athletic Trainers Association. Fair also taught courses associated with health and physical education as well as athletic training at Oklahoma State University, Langston University, and Oklahoma Osteopathic College. Fair worked with some football legends such as Jimmy Johnson, Pat Jones, Paul Johnson, Ken Niumatalolo, Mike Gundy, Thurman Thomas, and Heisman Trophy winner Barry Sanders.

=== United States Naval Academy ===
Fair joined the U.S. Naval Academy in 1997 as the Director of Athletic Training Services and continued his role becoming the Academy's Associate Athletic Director for Sports Medicine until his retirement in 2015. His 18 years of service and total dedication to the future Sailors and Marines of the U.S. Navy centered on keeping the student athletes in top condition and health.

It was while at the academy that Fair used his talents and experience to fashion NCAA-approved devices for aiding players to get back on the field while still recovering. One such device used by Bobby McClarin, termed "The Club," was essential in knocking down a potential touchdown pass during an interservice rivalry (U.S. Airforce Academy) game.

=== Patents ===
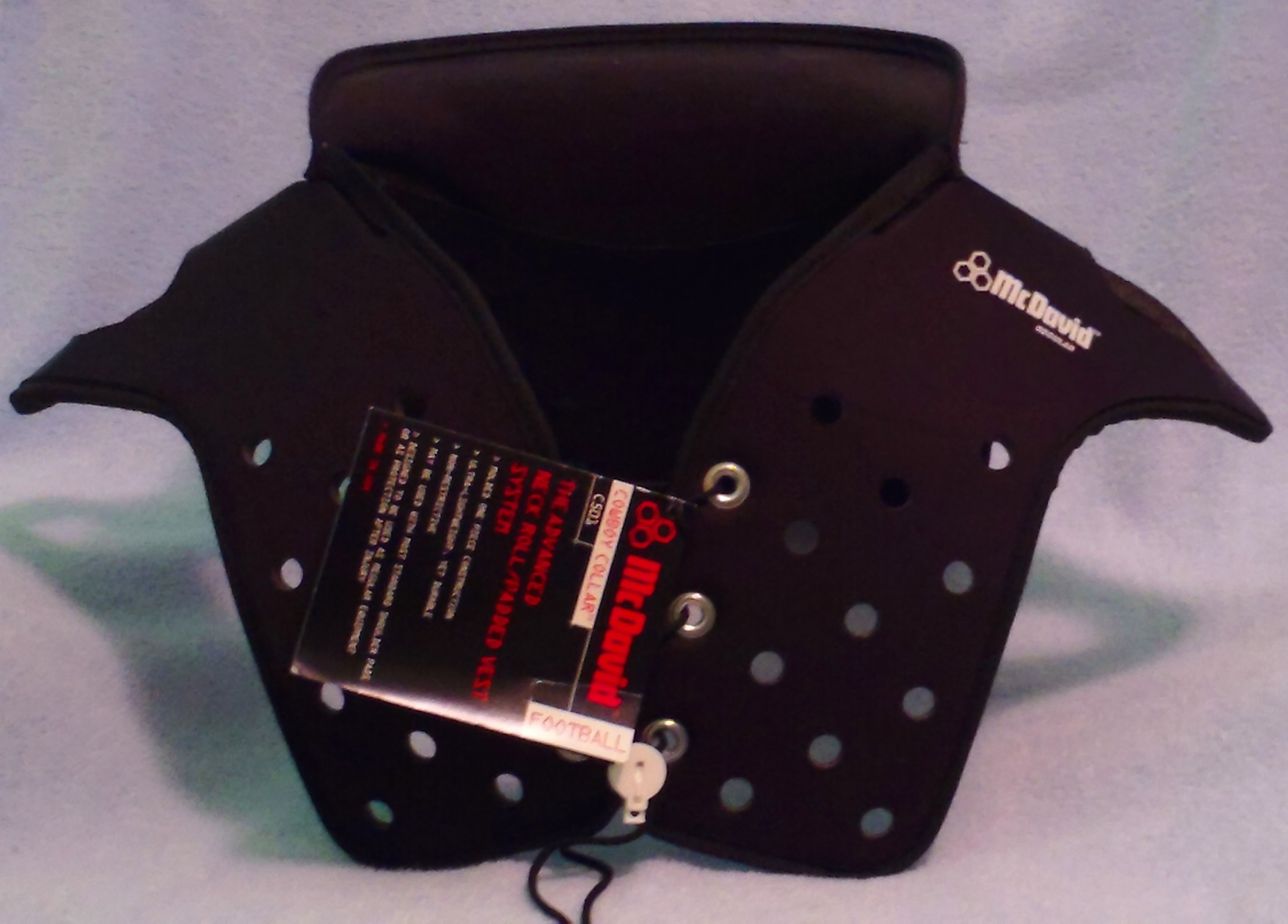
Picture of the Cowboy Collar

Fair is the inventor of the "Cowboy Collar" which holds three separate patents. The "Cowboy Collar", sold by McDavid, is a protective vest having a collar or neck guard intended for use with helmets and, optionally, with shoulder pads or harnesses, of the types worn by players in contact sports and has been used by players from all levels including the National Football League. The protective vest has a flexible body with shoulder portions between chest and back panels. Surrounding an opening for receiving a player's neck is a raised collar, integrally formed with the body, which has an upper ring-like surface for contacting the bottom edge of the player's helmet.

More recently, Fair designed and patented "The Anchor" Shoulder Brace in conjunction with Top Shelf Orthopedics (2014). He has designed football cleats for Nike (1991) and developed the lacrosse "Goalie Glove Thumb Protector" with STX in 2004.

=== Honors and awards ===
- Hall of Fame, Oklahoma State University, 2015
- American Academy Pediatric Sports Medicine Award, 2013
- Hall of Fame, Mid-America Athletic Trainers' Association, 2002
- Hall of Fame, Oklahoma Athletic Trainers' Association, 2002
- Naval Academy Athletic Association Distinguished Athletic Leadership Award, 2002 - 2003
- Most Distinguished Athletic Trainer Award, 1994
- Melvin Jones Fellow Award, 1996
- Oklahoma State University Distinguished Service Award, 1986
- Helping Hand Award - Oklahoma Lions Boys Ranch, 1992
- Lions Club Distinguished Service Award, 1990
- Honorary member of the United States Naval Academy class of 2015

=== Research and presentations ===
==== Journal publications ====
- “Using Prophylactic Orthotics for Turf Toe and mid-foot Sprains on Division 1 Football Players”, Lower Extremity Review, 2013
- “Frequency of Ankle and Knee Injuries During the 2010 United States Naval Academy Plebe Summer”, Publication approved, Pending
- “Low Back Pain in Women Athletes”, Coaching: Women’s Athletics, September/October 1979
- “Quick Splint for Acute Boutonniere Injuries”, The Physician and Sportsmedicine, August 2001
- “Doctor Shopping”, American Football Quarterly, 1st Quarter, 2004
- Trainers Corner in Physicians and Sportsmedicine, January 1976 – December 1978

==== Professional meeting presentations ====
- “Challenges in Athletic Training”, Virginia Athletic Trainers Association Meeting, George Mason University, 2007
- “Athletic Training”, State High School Coaches Meeting, 1979
- “DMSO: An Alternative Treatment for Sprains and Contusions”, Oklahoma Trainers Association, 1987
- “Injury Prevention”, Oklahoma College of Osteopathic Medicine and Surgery, Fall 1993-1997
- “Sports Nutrition”, Heavener Public Schools, 1993
- “Injury Prevention”, Duncan Regional Hospital, 1993
- “Rapid Eye Testing for Drug Abuse Identification” (11 High Schools 1986-1994)
- “Anabolic Steroids”, Mustang High School, 1990
- “Prevention of Athletic Injuries”, District Coaches Convention, 1990
- “DMSO”, Oklahoma Osteopathic Association Annual Convention, 1989
- “Strains and Contusions”, video production for the Oklahoma College of Osteopathic Medicine and Surgery, 1981
- “Athletic Training and Family Practitioner”, Oklahoma Family Practitioners, 1979
- “Prevention of Athletic Injuries”, District Coaches Convention, 1976
- “Athletic Injuries”, Coaches’ Shows and Lunches, 1972–Present

== Education ==
- Annandale High School in Fairfax Virginia
- Physical Education and Recreation, B.S. (1971) Kent State University
- Health, Physical Education/Counseling and Guidance, M.S. (1974) University of North Dakota
- Higher Education/Physical Education, Ed.D. (1987) Oklahoma State University
