= Bob Girard =

Canadian ice hockey player

- Born: April 12, 1948 Montreal, Quebec, Canada
- Died: November 5, 2017 (aged 69) L'Épiphanie, Quebec, Canada
- Height: 6 ft 0 in (183 cm)
- Weight: 175 lb (79 kg; 12 st 7 lb)
- Position: Left wing
- Shot: Left
- Played for: California Golden Seals; Washington Capitals; Cleveland Barons
- NHL draft: Undrafted
- Playing career: 1973–1980

Robert Girard (April 12, 1948 – November 5, 2017) was a Canadian ice hockey player who played 305 National Hockey League (NHL) games with the California Golden Seals, Cleveland Barons and Washington Capitals. He scored 45 goals and 69 assists in his NHL career. He also played for the Charlotte Checkers, Salt Lake Golden Eagles and Hershey Bears in the minor leagues.

He died in L'Épiphanie, Quebec on November 5, 2017, at age 69.

== Career statistics ==
=== Regular season and playoffs ===
			Regular season					Playoffs
Season	Team	League	GP	G	A	Pts	PIM	GP	G	A	Pts	PIM
1972–73	Amqui Aces	QSHL	45	18	33	51	—	—	—	—	—	—
1973–74	Charlotte Checkers	SHL	23	5	17	22	12	—	—	—	—	—
1973–74	Salt Lake Golden Eagles	WHL	50	2	19	21	37	1	0	0	0	2
1974–75	Salt Lake Golden Eagles	CHL	74	13	32	45	60	11	0	2	2	10
1975–76	California Golden Seals	NHL	80	16	26	42	54	—	—	—	—	—
1976–77	Cleveland Barons	NHL	68	11	10	21	33	—	—	—	—	—
1976–77	Salt Lake Golden Eagles	CHL	4	2	6	8	0	—	—	—	—	—
1977–78	Cleveland Barons	NHL	25	0	4	4	11	—	—	—	—	—
1977–78	Washington Capitals	NHL	52	9	14	23	6	—	—	—	—	—
1978–79	Washington Capitals	NHL	79	9	15	24	36	—	—	—	—	—
1979–80	Washington Capitals	NHL	1	0	0	0	0	—	—	—	—	—
1979–80	Hershey Bears	AHL	74	15	26	41	63	16	5	5	10	6
1980–81	HC Lugano	NLB	—	—	—	—	—	—	—	—	—	—
NHL totals			305	45	69	114	140	—	—	—	—	—
