= Owen Lloyd =

Canadian ice hockey player

- Born: April 30, 1957 (age 67); North Vancouver, British Columbia, Canada
- Height: 5 ft 11 in (180 cm)
- Weight: 200 lb (91 kg; 14 st 4 lb)
- Position: Defence
- Shot: Left
- Played for: Edmonton Oilers
- NHL draft: 77th overall, 1977; Cleveland Barons
- WHA draft: 85th overall, 1977; Edmonton Oilers
- Playing career: 1977–1983

Owen George Lloyd (born April 30, 1957) is a former professional ice hockey defenceman.

Born in North Vancouver, British Columbia, Lloyd was drafted 77th overall by the Cleveland Barons in the 1977 NHL amateur draft and 85th overall by the Edmonton Oilers in the 1977 WHA Amateur Draft. Lloyd played three games for the Oilers in the WHA during the 1977–78 season, scoring one assist and acquiring four penalty minutes.

He also played for several minor league teams during his career including the Central Hockey League's Phoenix Roadrunners, Houston Apollos and the Wichita Wind and brief spells in the American Hockey League for the Springfield Indians and the International Hockey League for the Milwaukee Admirals.

== Career statistics ==
			Regular season					Playoffs
Season	Team	League	GP	G	A	Pts	PIM	GP	G	A	Pts	PIM
1975–76	Medicine Hat Tigers	WCHL	70	0	13	13	304	8	1	3	4	27
1976–77	Medicine Hat Tigers	WCHL	70	5	25	30	354	4	0	2	2	15
1977–78	Phoenix Roadrunners	CHL	12	0	2	2	32	—	—	—	—	—
1977–78	Edmonton Oilers	WHA	3	0	1	1	4	—	—	—	—	—
1977–78	Seattle Breakers	WCHL	39	7	24	31	127	—	—	—	—	—
1978–79	San Diego Hawks	PHL	57	5	19	24	143	—	—	—	—	—
1978–79	Springfield Indians	AHL	4	0	1	1	11	—	—	—	—	—
1979–80	Spokane Flyers	WIHL	Statistics unavailable
1979–80	Houston Apollos	CHL	53	2	11	13	207	4	1	1	2	12
1980–81	Milwaukee Admirals	IHL	4	0	1	1	2	—	—	—	—	—
1980–81	Wichita Wind	CHL	52	2	16	18	187	16	0	5	5	50
1981–82	Milwaukee Admirals	IHL	3	0	1	1	7	—	—	—	—	—
1981–82	Wichita Wind	CHL	52	2	9	11	130	1	0	0	0	2
1982–83	Wichita Wind	CHL	63	0	22	22	148	—	—	—	—	—
1992–93	San Diego Surf	PSHL	Statistics unavailable
	WHA totals		3	0	1	1	4	—	—	—	—	—
