= Francis Chaine =

Francis Chaine (Chinese: 陳肇川; born 23 November 1921) was a Hong Kong lawyer and politician. He was an elected member of the Urban Council of Hong Kong from 1981 to 1983.

Chaine was born in Hong Kong in 1921 and was educated at Wah Yan College, Hong Kong, and the Inns of Court School of Law, London. He started his practise in 1960. He was also the secretary of and legal adviser to the South China Athletic Association and chairman of the Hong Kong Football Association in 1968. He co-founded the Hong Kong Tenpin Bowling Congress and was its first and second term chairman. He first contested the Urban Council election in 1979 for the Reform Club of Hong Kong but was not elected. He ran again in 1981 and was elected with 3,467 votes. He ran in the Southern District when the new Urban Council district-based electoral method was introduced in the 1983 election, but was defeated by Joseph Chan Yuek-sut.

Political offices
Preceded by Henry Hu	Member of the Urban Council; 1981–1983	Succeeded by Joseph Chan
