= Elizabeth Fair =

English writer

Elizabeth Fair (1908–1997) was an English writer who was known for humorous novels of English village life.

== Early life ==
Elizabeth Mary Fair was born in 1908 Haigh, Lancashire, a small village not far from Wigan. Her father was the land agent for the 10th Earl of Crawford and Balcarres, whose family seat, Haigh Hall, was nearby. Her father died in 1934 and the family moved to Hampshire.

During World War II Fair served for five years as an ambulance driver in the Civil Defence Corps in Southampton. In 1944 she joined the Red Cross and spent eighteen months in Ceylon, India, and Belgium. After returning to England in 1947, she moved to Boldre in Hampshire.

== Writing ==
Fair wrote six novels of English village life that humorously and gently dissected the "polite social politics" of village denizens while managing to incorporate a romance or two. Reviewers typically compare her work to that of Margery Sharp or Angela Thirkell, with Stevie Smith and other reviewers noting that her work has affinities with Trollope. Of her novel All One Summer, the author wrote that it was meant for people like herself who "prefer not to take life too seriously". Writer Compton Mackenzie said of this novel that it was "in the best tradition of English humour".

Fair's third novel, The Native Heath (1954) was published with a jacket design by Shirley Hughes.

Fair published her last novel in 1960 and died in 1997.

The six novels were reissued in new paperback editions by Dean Street Press in 2017.

In the late 1950s Fair had written another novel, The Marble Staircase, but it was not published during her lifetime. It was believed lost, but in 2021 it was rediscovered by the author's heirs. It was published by Dean Street Press in 2022.

== Novels ==
- Bramton Wick (1952)
- Landscape in Sunlight (1953, published in the U.S. as All One Summer)
- The Native Heath (1954, published in the U.S. as Julia Comes Home)
- Seaview House (1955, published in the U.S. as A View of the Sea)
- A Winter Away (1957)
- The Mingham Air (written c.1960, published in 2022)
- The Marble Staircase (2022)
