= John Chaine =

Irish Anglican priest

John Chaine was an Irish Anglican priest.

Chaine was born in County Antrim and educated at Trinity College, Dublin. He was Dean of Connor from his collation in 1839 until his resignation in 1855.
