= Zora Fair =

American Confederate spy

Izora (Zora) Fair was a native of South Carolina. During the American Civil War, she was a refugee in Oxford, Georgia. In November 1864, she nearly exposed General Sherman's planned "March to the Sea" to the Confederacy. She was sometimes called "Oxford's Confederate Girl Spy".

Fair disguised herself as an African-American, by staining her skin with crushed walnut hulls, and sneaked into Sherman's headquarters in Atlanta. Overhearing some officers discussing Sherman's planned route to Savannah, including the plan to divide the force into two groups, she left the headquarters and attempted to report what she had learned to Confederate General Joseph Johnston. Her letter was intercepted by the Union Army, which attempted to track her down. Sources differ as to whether or not the Union Army caught and interrogated her.

After the war, she returned to South Carolina. She died a few months later.
