= Bryan Fair =

American lawyer

Bryan Keith Fair (born August 12, 1960) is an American academic; his research has focused on race and constitutional law. Since 2000, he has been the Thomas E. Skinner Professor of Law at the University of Alabama School of Law. He presently serves as the chairman of the board of directors of the Southern Poverty Law Center. He is the author of Notes of a Racial Caste Baby: Colorblindness and the End of Affirmative Action. He completed his undergraduate studies at Duke University, and after studying law at the UCLA School of Law, was admitted to the California Bar in 1986.

== Selected works ==
- Fair, Bryan K. (1997). Notes of a racial caste baby: color blindness and the end of affirmative action. New York, New York: New York University Press. ISBN 9780585002583. OCLC 42854096.
