= Phoenix Roadrunners (CHL) =

Former pro ice hockey team

- City: Phoenix, Arizona
- League: Central Hockey League
- Founded: 1977
- Operated: 1977-78
- Home arena: Veterans Memorial Coliseum

The Phoenix Roadrunners were a minor pro ice hockey team in Phoenix, Arizona. They played in the Central Hockey League in the 1977–78 season. After two months the team folded on December 12, 1977. They only played 27 games, winning only 4 and tying 3. They played in the Veterans Memorial Coliseum.

They followed after the World Hockey Association's Phoenix Roadrunners folded following the 1976–77 WHA season.
