= 1977 WHA playoffs =

WHA postseason tournament

Tournament details
- Dates: April 9 – May 26, 1977
- Season: 1976–77
- Teams: 8
- Defending champions: Winnipeg Jets

Final positions
- Champions: Quebec Nordiques (1st title)
- Runners-up: Winnipeg Jets

Tournament statistics
- Scoring leader(s): Serge Bernier (Nordiques) (36 points)

Awards
- MVP: Serge Bernier (Nordiques)

The 1977 WHA playoffs was the postseason tournament of the World Hockey Association's 1976–77 season. For the first time ever, the best team in points for the regular season did not win the championship, as the Houston Aeros were trounced in the Semifinal round to end their three-year streak of reaching the Avco Cup Final by the Winnipeg Jets. The tournament concluded with the Eastern Division champion Quebec Nordiques defeating the Western Division champion Winnipeg Jets in seven games for their first and only Avco Cup championship. Serge Bernier was named the WHA Playoff MVP.

== Playoff seeds ==
Now with two divisions again, WHA reverted to the original playoff structure in which the top four teams in each division made the playoffs and faced each other in the first two rounds to set up the Avco Cup Final.

=== Western Division ===
1. Houston Aeros, Western Division champions – 106 points
2. Winnipeg Jets – 94 points
3. San Diego Mariners – 85 points
4. Edmonton Oilers – 72 points

=== Eastern Division ===
1. Quebec Nordiques, Eastern Division champions – 97 points
2. Cincinnati Stingers – 83 points
3. Indianapolis Racers – 80 points
4. New England Whalers – 76 points

== Bracket ==
Quarterfinals
E1	Quebec Nordiques	4
E4	New England Whalers	1
Eastern Division
E2	Cincinnati Stingers	0
E3	Indianapolis Racers	4
W1	Houston Aeros	4
W4	Edmonton Oilers	1
Western Division
W2	Winnipeg Jets	4
W3	San Diego Mariners	3

Semifinals
E1	Quebec Nordiques	4
E3	Indianapolis Racers	1
W1	Houston Aeros	2
W2	Winnipeg Jets	4

Finals
E1	Quebec Nordiques	4
W2	Winnipeg Jets	3

== Division Semifinals ==
=== Eastern Division Semifinals ===
==== (E1) Quebec Nordiques vs. (E4) New England Whalers ====
Quebec had gone 8–2–1 against New England in the regular season.

April 9	New England Whalers	2–5 (0–2, 2–0, 0–3)	Quebec Nordiques	Colisée de Québec; Attendance: 8,090

Box score
Bruce Landon	Goalies	Richard Brodeur
6:04 (2nd) – Gordie Roberts; 10:36 (2nd) – Tom Webster / Goals / 0:39 (1st) – Wally Weir; 14:49 (1st) – Andre Boudrias; 5:05 (3rd) – Francois Lacombe; 7:44 (3rd) – Pierre Guite; 12:43 (3rd) – Real Cloutier
20 (6–7–7)	Shots	21 (7–6–8)

April 12	Quebec Nordiques	7–3 (2–1, 3–0, 2–2)	New England Whalers	Colisée de Québec; Attendance: 8,596

Box score
Richard Brodeur	Goalies	Cap Raeder
11:10 (1st) – Real Cloutier; 15:38 (1st) – J. C. Tremblay; 3:38 (2nd) – Real Cloutier; 8:10 (2nd) – Paulin Bordeleau; 18:24 (2nd) – Serge Bernier; 8:20 (3rd) – Curt Brackenbury; 9:04 (3rd) – Pierre Guite / Goals / 7:35 (1st) – John McKenzie; 0:17 (3rd) – Dave Keon; 12:26 (3rd) – Dave Keon
28 (12–7–9)	Shots	34 (8–11–15)

April 14	Quebec Nordiques	4–3 (OT) (1–1, 2–1, 0–1, 1–0)	New England Whalers	Hartford Civic Center; Attendance: 9,223

Box score
Richard Brodeur	Goalies	Christer Abrahamsson
12:25 (1st) – Serge Bernier; 6:07 (2nd) – Serge Bernier; 17:10 (2nd) – Paulin Bordeleau; 1:50 (OT) - Paul Baxter / Goals / 6:36 (1st) – Gordie Roberts; 6:36 (2nd) – Mike Antonovich; 19:05 (3rd) – John McKenzie
36 (11–13–8–4)	Shots	38 (13–18–7–0)

April 16	Quebec Nordiques	4–6 (2–3, 0–1, 2–2)	New England Whalers	Hartford Civic Center; Attendance: 10,507

Box score
Richard Brodeur / Serge Aubry	Goalies	Bruce Landon
15:09 (1st) – Real Cloutier; 18:26 (1st) – Real Cloutier; 1:01 (3rd) – Pierre Guite; 7:41 (3rd) – Bob Fitchner / Goals / 5:36 (1st) – Dave Keon; 6:57 (1st) – Jack Carlson; 8:09 (1st) – Larry Pleau; 8:05 (2nd) – Mike Rogers; 6:23 (3rd) – George Lyle; 17:28 (3rd) – Mike Antonovich
33 (10–9–14)	Shots	31 (10–8–13)

April 19	New England Whalers	0–3 (0–1, 0–1, 0–1)	Quebec Nordiques	Colisée de Québec; Attendance: 6,388

Box score
Bruce Landon / Christer Abrahamsson	Goalies	Richard Brodeur
No scoring / Goals / 8:03 (1st) – Andre Boudrias; 4:23 (2nd) – Serge Bernier; 0:23 (3rd) – Bob Fitchner
19 (5–6–8)	Shots	36 (12–14–10)

==== (E3) Indianapolis Racers vs. (E2) Cincinnati Stingers ====
Indianapolis had gone 5–4–1 against Cincinnati in the regular season.

The two teams became part of history in Game 1. Cincinnati lost their starting goalie Jacques Caron during the warmup for Game 1 when he was hit by a puck in the ribs. He was replaced by rookie Norm Lapointe. Cincinnati had a lead in each of the first three periods but Indianapolis countered it with a goal of their own, with Reg Thomas tying the game for the Racers with 1:04 remaining in regulation that set up overtime. Game 1 went to three overtimes and ended in the wee hours of Easter morning, lasting a total of 108 minutes and 40 seconds, shattering the previous longest overtime game in WHA history (69:44, 1973); notably, the last 45 minutes of the game saw no penalties called on any player. The winning goal came after Mark Lomenda missed on a slapshot that saw the puck carom to Gene Peacosh, who lifted it right past LaPointe to end the game. It was the longest pro hockey game in 41 years. Caron started Game 2 but was pulled after giving up three goals in the first period, with Lapointe playing the rest of the series as goaltender.

April 9	Indianapolis Racers	4–3 (3OT) (1–1, 1–1, 1–1, 0–0, 0–0, 1–0)	Cincinnati Stingers	Riverfront Coliseum; Attendance: 12,490

Box score
Paul Hoganson	Goalies	Norm Lapointe
11:05 (1st) – Mark Lomenda; 18:23 (2nd) – Mark Lomenda; 18:56 (3rd) – Reg Thomas; 8:40 (OT) – Gene Peacosh / Goals / 4:58 (1st) – Rich LeDuc; 9:48 (2nd) – Dennis Abgrall; 17:21 (3rd) – Claude Larose
52 (12–10–5–8–12–5)	Shots	59 (9–15–13–8–11–3)

April 12	Indianapolis Racers	7–2 (3–0, 2–1, 2–1)	Cincinnati Stingers	Riverfront Coliseum; Attendance: 8,967

Box score
Michel Dion	Goalies	Jacques Caron / Norm Lapointe
5:15 (1st) – Reg Thomas; 5:58 (1st) – Mark Lomenda; 13:43 (1st) – Rene LeClerc; 9:14 (2nd) – Nick Harbaruk; 10:25 (2nd) – Michel Parizeau; 1:13 (3rd) – Blair MacDonald; 7:16 (3rd) – Reg Thomas / Goals / 19:48 (2nd) – Dennis Abgrall; 9:45 (3rd) – Ron Plumb
31 (7–14–10)	Shots	32 (14–10–8)

April 14	Cincinnati Stingers	3–5 (1–2, 0–1, 2–2)	Indianapolis Racers	Market Square Arena; Attendance: 10,383

Box score
Norm Lapointe	Goalies	Paul Hoganson
11:25 (1st) – Peter Marsh; 1:16 (3rd) – Peter Marsh; 2:05 (3rd) – Claude Larose / Goals / 4:25 (1st) – Brian McDonald; 14:22 (1st) – Blair MacDonald; 2:12 (2nd) – Blair MacDonald; 7:10 (3rd) – Brian McDonald; 13:00 (3rd) – Blair MacDonald
33 (14–4–15)	Shots	23 (6–9–8)

April 16	Cincinnati Stingers	1–3 (0–1, 0–1, 1–1)	Indianapolis Racers	Market Square Arena; Attendance: 16,070

Box score
Norm Lapointe	Goalies	Michel Dion
14:03 (3rd) – Greg Carroll / Goals / 4:38 (1st) – Reg Thomas; 9:02 (2nd) – Brian McDonald; 15:04 (3rd) – Al Karlander
26 (7–13–6)	Shots	24 (8–5–11)

=== Western Division Semifinals ===
==== (W1) Houston Aeros vs. (W4) Edmonton Oilers ====
Houston had gone 7–1–1 against Edmonton in the regular season.

April 13	Edmonton Oilers	3–4 (OT) (1–0, 1–2, 1–1, 0–1)	Houston Aeros	The Summitt; Attendance: 7,442

Box score
Jean-Louis Levasseur	Goalies	Ron Grahame
18:27 (1st) – Gregg Boddy; 1:16 (2nd) – Randy Rota; 3:05 (3rd) – Glen Sather / Goals / 16:27 (2nd) – Rich Preston; 19:36 (2nd) – Larry Lund; 6:14 (3rd) – Ted Taylor; 13:11 (OT) – Morris Lukowich
27 (8–5–8–6)	Shots	45 (11–8–14–12)

April 15	Edmonton Oilers	2–6 (0–1, 1–3, 1–2)	Houston Aeros	The Summitt; Attendance: 10,382

Box score
Jean-Louis Levasseur	Goalies	Ron Grahame
1:32 (2nd) – Brett Callighen; 3:55 (3rd) – Brett Callighen / Goals / 10:59 (1st) – Don Larway; 9:29 (2nd) – Al McLeod; 11:25 (2nd) – Marty Howe; 16:58 (2nd) – Rich Preston; 1:53 (3rd) – Terry Ruskowski; 17:26 (3rd) – Cam Connor
24 (6–8–10)	Shots	29 (9–12–8)

April 17	Houston Aeros	2–7 (1–3, 1–2, 0–2)	Edmonton Oilers	Northlands Coliseum; Attendance: 14,754

Box score
Ron Grahame	Goalies	Ken Broderick
8:21 (1st) – Gordie Howe; 4:20 (2nd) – Mark Howe / Goals / 2:55 (1st) – Bryan Campbell; 8:51 (1st) – Dave Langevin; 13:57 (1st) – Brett Callighen; 2:23 (2nd) – Brett Callighen; 17:21 (2nd) – Gavin Kirk; 15:46 (3rd) – Randy Rota; 18:56 (3rd) – Bryan Campbell
27 (7–12–8)	Shots	40 (14–17–9)

April 20	Houston Aeros	4–1 (2–1, 1–0, 1–0)	Edmonton Oilers	Northlands Coliseum; Attendance: 15,334

Box score
Wayne Rutledge	Goalies	Ken Broderick
6:18 (1st) – Morris Lukowich; Morris Lukowich; 18:21 (1st) - Ted Taylor; 5:59 (2nd) - Morris Lukowich; 11:42 (3rd) – Morris Lukowich / Goals / 12:24 (1st) – Claude St. Sauveur
27 (7–8–12)	Shots	34 (14–9–11)

April 22	Edmonton Oilers	3–4 (1–2, 2–1, 0–1)	Houston Aeros	The Summitt; Attendance: 11,022

Box score
Ken Broderick	Goalies	Wayne Rutledge
0:28 (1st) – Bryan Campbell; 0:49 (2nd) – Dave Langevin; 5:58 (2nd) – Randy Rota / Goals / 6:41 (1st) – Rich Preston; 8:38 (1st) – Ted Taylor; 2:59 (2nd) – Gordie Howe; 0:32 (3rd) - Ron Hansis
9 8 3 - 20	Shots	15 6 7 - 28

==== (W2) Winnipeg Jets vs. (W3) San Diego Mariners ====
The two teams split their eight regular season matchups. Ultimately, the home team wound up winning each game in the series.

Game 4 was a strange affair all around in San Diego. In the midst of a tripping penalty (as charged to Jet player Mike Ford) being nearly killed off, Norm Ferguson broke a late 4–4 tie with 1:45 remaining in the third period, doing so on a soft low shot from 15 feet away. Jets coach Bobby Kromm, enraged by referee Ron Ego that he felt "determined the outcome of the game", threw a plastic water jug at him and even kicked the door of the officials room and yelled at Mariners GM Ballard Smith. Various technical issues affected the organ (beer was spilled on it) and goal lights (white towels were to be waved for a goal), the clock (leading to Rudy Pilous being sat next to the timekeeper), and last of all, the mercury lights high above the ice, which went out in the third period. All in all, the game was delayed 35 minutes. Prior to Game 5, Daley stated to his team, "Tonight, fellas, give me one goal and I'll do the rest." Daley proceeded to have a shutout as Winnipeg led early in the first period and led on from there.

In the first ever Game 7 in Jets history, Winnipeg rode a busy first period on their way to victory. This was the only Game 7 hosted in the city of Winnipeg until the second Jets team hosted Game 7 in the 2025 Stanley Cup playoffs.

April 10	San Diego Mariners	1–5 (0–2, 0–2, 1–1)	Winnipeg Jets	Winnipeg Arena; Attendance: 8,894

Box score
Ernie Wakely / Ken Lockett	Goalies	Joe Daley
8:20 (3rd) – Ray Adduono / Goals / 1:49 (1st) – Anders Hedberg; 17:50 (1st) – Bobby Hull; 0:36 (2nd) – Danny Lawson; 13:02 (2nd) – Bobby Hull; 13:29 (3rd) – Willy Lindstrom
27 (11–6–10)	Shots	39 (13–20–6)

April 12	San Diego Mariners	1–4 (1–1, 0–0, 0–3)	Winnipeg Jets	Winnipeg Arena; Attendance: 9,041

Box score
Ken Lockett	Goalies	Joe Daley
13:36 (1st) – Norm Ferguson / Goals / 11:01 (1st) – Bobby Hull; 1:30 (3rd) - Dave Dunn; 6:06 (3rd) – Perry Miller; 16:55 (3rd) – Bobby Hull
20 (11–5–4)	Shots	31 (5–12–14)

April 16	Winnipeg Jets	4–5 (3–0, 1–2, 0–3)	San Diego Mariners	San Diego Sports Arena; Attendance: 10,108

Box score
Joe Daley	Goalies	Ken Lockett
3:34 (1st) – Peter Sullivan; 4:24 (1st) – Willy Lindstrom; 12:52 (1st) – Lyle Moffat; 5:34 (2nd) – Lyle Moffat / Goals / 2:10 (2nd) – Joe Noris; 9:33 (2nd) – Andre Lacroix; 4:02 (3rd) – Don Burgess; 12:00 (3rd) – Wayne Rivers; 13:46 (3rd) - Rick Sentes
28 (8–10–10)	Shots	33 (9–10–14)

April 17	Winnipeg Jets	4–6 (1–3, 3–1, 0–2)	San Diego Mariners	San Diego Sports Arena; Attendance: 9,830

Box score
Joe Daley	Goalies	Ernie Wakely
9:24 (1st) – Danny Lawson; 5:59 (2nd) – Bob Guindon; 12:28 (2nd) – Bobby Hull; 16:08 (2nd) – Dan Labraaten / Goals / 1:44 (1st) – Don Burgess; 11:47 (1st) – Ray Adduono; 15:16 (1st) – Rick Sentes; 17:09 (2nd) – Rick Sentes; 18:15 (3rd) – Norm Ferguson; 19:32 (3rd) – Kevin Devine
27 (9–13–5)	Shots	27 (11–12–4)

April 20	San Diego Mariners	0–3 (0–1, 0–0, 0–2)	Winnipeg Jets	Winnipeg Arena; Attendance: 9,021

Box score
Ken Lockett	Goalies	Joe Daley
No scoring / Goals / 3:44 (1st) – Mats Lindh; 7:22 (3rd) – Mats Lindh; 11:44 (3rd) – Willy Lindstrom
25 (14–4–7)	Shots	41 (12–12–17)

April 22	Winnipeg Jets	1–3 (0–0, 1–3, 0–0)	San Diego Mariners	San Diego Sports Arena; Attendance: 11,450

Box score
Joe Daley	Goalies	Ernie Wakely
0:51 (2nd) – Anders Hedberg / Goals / 4:33 (2nd) – Kevin Morrison; 7:45 (2nd) – Rick Sentes; 8:52 (2nd) – John French
15 (2–6–7)	Shots	30 (11–10–9)

April 24	San Diego Mariners	3–7 (1–3, 1–1, 1–3)	Winnipeg Jets	Winnipeg Arena; Attendance: 10,342

Box score
Ken Lockett	Goalies	Joe Daley
11:30 (1st) – Ray Adduono; 7:01 (2nd) – Joe Noris; 17:46 (3rd) – John French / Goals / 1:52 (1st) – Anders Hedberg; 13:34 (1st) – Bob Guindon; 18:32 (1st) – Ulf Nilsson; 1:17 (2nd) – Anders Hedberg; 0:32 (3rd) – Bobby Hull; 1:03 (3rd) – Bobby Hull; 4:20 (3rd) – Dave Dunn
31 (8–11–12)	Shots	40 (19–8–13)

== Division Finals ==
=== Eastern Division Finals ===
==== (E1) Quebec Nordiques vs. (E3) Indianapolis Racers ====
Quebec went 6–5 against Indianapolis in the regular season.

April 23	Indianapolis Racers	1–3 (0–0, 1–3, 0–0)	Quebec Nordiques	Colisée de Québec; Attendance: 7,309

Box score
Paul Hoganson	Goalies	Richard Brodeur
8:16 (2nd) – Michel Parizeau / Goals / 4:03 (2nd) – Serge Bernier; 7:10 (2nd) – Paul Baxter; 19:36 (2nd) – Serge Bernier
21 (7–11–3)	Shots	37 (18–12–7)

April 25	Indianapolis Racers	3–8 (1–2, 1–4, 1–2)	Quebec Nordiques	Colisée de Québec; Attendance: 7,716

Box score
Michel Dion	Goalies	Richard Brodeur
16:23 (1st) – Brian McDonald; 13:33 (2nd) – Pat Stapleton; 0:58 (3rd) – Reg Thomas / Goals / 15:04 (1st) – Real Cloutier; 15:34 (1st) – Steve Sutherland; 10:12 (2nd) – Marc Tardif; 15:16 (2nd) – Francis Lacombe; 17:37 (2nd) – Serge Bernier; 19:36 (2nd) – Steve Sutherland; 1:14 (3rd) – Steve Sutherland; 2:57 (3rd) – Norm Dube
25 (10–7–8)	Shots	33 (10–17–6)

April 28	Quebec Nordiques	6–5 (OT) (1–3, 4–1, 0–1, 1–0)	Indianapolis Racers	Market Square Arena; Attendance: 11,523

Box score
Richard Brodeur	Goalies	Michel Dion
12:17 (1st) – Paulin Bordeleau; 2:52 (2nd) – Andre Boudrias; 8:42 (2nd) – Marc Tardif; 17:12 (2nd) – Paulin Bordeleau; 18:26 (2nd) – Serge Bernier; 5:29 (OT) – Paulin Bordeleau / Goals / 12:07 (1st) – Reg Thomas; 13:32 (1st) – Gene Peacosh; 19:22 (1st) – Reg Thomas; 12:20 (2nd) – Al Karlander; 3:25 (3rd) – Gene Peacosh
47 (9–19–11–6)	Shots	37 (14-11-10–2)

April 30	Quebec Nordiques	0–2 (0–0, 0–1, 0–1)	Indianapolis Racers	Market Square Arena; Attendance: 12,521

Box score
Richard Brodeur	Goalies	Paul Hoganson
No scoring / Goals / 12:43 (2nd) – Michel Parizeau; 12:45 (3rd) – Darryl Maggs
22 (4–10–8)	Shots	26 (8–15–3)

May 2	Indianapolis Racers	3–8 (1–3, 0–2, 2–3)	Quebec Nordiques	Colisée de Québec; Attendance: 7,326

Box score
Paul Hoganson	Goalies	Richard Brodeur
14:23 (1st) – Pat Stapleton; 0:26 (3rd) – Blair MacDonald; 9:20 (3rd) – Blair MacDonald / Goals / 2:25 (1st) – Serge Bernier; 4:02 (1st) – Francois Lacombe; 18:17 (1st) – Paulin Bordeleau; 9:11 (2nd) – Real Cloutier; 9:59 (2nd) – Real Cloutier; 1:31 (3rd) – Paulin Bordeleau; 6:24 (3rd) - Norm Dube; 8:40 (3rd) – Real Cloutier
33 (5–11–17)	Shots	29 (8–11–10)

=== Western Division Finals ===
==== (W1) Houston Aeros vs. (W2) Winnipeg Jets ====
Houston had gone 4–3–1 against Winnipeg in the regular season.

This was the fourth and final time these two teams met in the playoffs, as the two teams previously met in the 1973 Western Division Final, the 1974 Western Division Quarterfinals, and the 1976 Avco Cup Finals. Winnipeg ended Houston's chance to return for another Avco Cup appearance. This meant for the first time in WHA history, the team with the best regular season record did not reach the Avco Cup Final.

April 26	Winnipeg Jets	4–3 (OT) (2–1, 0–2, 1–0, 1–0)	Houston Aeros	The Summitt; Attendance: 8,235

Box score
Joe Daley	Goalies	Ron Grahame
1:45 (1st) – Peter Sullivan; 9:11 (1st) – Anders Hedberg; 5:05 (3rd) – Ulf Nilsson; 8:05 (OT) – Peter Sullivan / Goals / 7:29 (1st) – Marty Howe; 9:32 (2nd) – John Tonelli; 12:32 (2nd) – Terry Ruskowski
25 (9–3–8–5)	Shots	38 (15–13–8–2)

April 28	Winnipeg Jets	2–7 (1–1, 1–5, 0–1)	Houston Aeros	The Summitt; Attendance: 9,533

Box score
Joe Daley / Curt Larsson	Goalies	Ron Grahame
16:36 (1st) – Ted Green; 15:47 (2nd) – Anders Hedberg / Goals / 15:08 (1st) – Mark Howe; 3:30 (2nd) – Larry Lund; 4:40 (2nd) – Mark Howe; 11:15 (2nd) – Mark Howe; 12:07 (2nd) – Gordie Howe; 16:08 (2nd) – John Schella; 9:24 (3rd) – Gordie Howe
23 (9–4–10)	Shots	38 (21–11–6)

April 30	Houston Aeros	3–4 (1–1, 1–2, 1–1)	Winnipeg Jets	Winnipeg Arena; Attendance: 10,076

Box score
Ron Grahame	Goalies	Joe Daley
16:44 (1st) – Mark Howe; 19:57 (2nd) – John Tonelli; 15:09 (3rd) – Gordie Howe / Goals / 8:40 (1st) – Bobby Hull; 8:18 (2nd) – Dave Dunn; 15:11 (2nd) – Peter Sullivan; 18:24 (3rd) – Peter Sullivan
25 (9–8–8)	Shots	38 (12–10–16)

May 1	Houston Aeros	4–6 (0–2, 3–3, 1–1)	Winnipeg Jets	Winnipeg Arena; Attendance: 10,332

Box score
Ron Grahame	Goalies	Joe Daley / Curt Larsson
6:13 (2nd) – Morris Lukowich; 16:21 (2nd) – Morris Lukowich; 19:30 (2nd) – Cam Connor; 11:02 (3rd) – Marty Howe / Goals / 8:54 (1st) – Ulf Nilsson; 15:59 (1st) – Anders Hedberg; 3:46 (2nd) – Dan Labraaten; 9:31 (2nd) – Dave Dunn; 16:33 (2nd) – Anders Hedberg; 16:57 (3rd) – Anders Hedberg
33 (11–10–12)	Shots	31 (7–16–8)

May 3	Winnipeg Jets	2–3 (0–0, 1–2, 1–1)	Houston Aeros	The Summitt; Attendance: 10,819

Box score
Joe Daley	Goalies	Ron Grahame
13:09 (2nd) – Mike Ford; 2:24 (3rd) – Perry Miller / Goals / 10:36 (2nd) – Terry Ruskowski; 18:59 (2nd) – Terry Ruskowski; 6:09 (3rd) – Ted Taylor
19 (8–7–4)	Shots	24 (7–7–10)

May 5	Houston Aeros	3–6 (0–1, 1–3, 2–2)	Winnipeg Jets	Winnipeg Arena; Attendance: 10,323

Box score
Ron Grahame	Goalies	Joe Daley
5:52 (2nd) – Terry Ruskowski; 0:35 (3rd) – Cam Connor; 17:14 (3rd) – John Tonelli / Goals / 8:08 (1st) – Barry Long; 2:45 (2nd) – Willy Lindstrom; 5:15 (2nd) – Bill Lesuk; 8:05 (2nd) – Bobby Hull; 2:56 (3rd) – Willy Lindstrom; 5:46 (3rd) – Anders Hedberg
24 (11–3–10)	Shots	37 (10–11–16)

== Avco Cup Final ==
=== (E1) Quebec Nordiques vs. (W2) Winnipeg Jets ===
The series matched the defending champion Winnipeg Jets, as coached by Bobby Kromm versus the Quebec Nordiques, as coached by Marc Boileau. The two teams had split their six regular season matchups.

11,697 fans saw Game 1 in Quebec City. In Game 1, Joe Daley stopped 31 of 32 shots for Winnipeg, who scored on goals by Dan Labraaten and Willy Lindstrom to take the lead 2–0 in the second period. Quebec's top line of Real Cloutier, Marc Tardif, and Christian Bordeleau were neutralized, with Cloutier apparently so nervous that he did not appear for the last two minutes of the game. Among missed opportunities for Quebec, Cloutier had a no goal (as ruled by referee Bill Friday), Tardif hit a goal post and Steve Sutherland missed an open net by grazing the goalpost. Ulf Nilsson committed a tripping penalty with 1:57 to go in the game, but Daley and the Jets managed to kill the penalty. In a physical Game 2, Quebec responded furiously in Game 2 with a four-goal first period, with Steve Sutherland scoring two goals for the game and goaltender Richard Brodeur stopping all but one shot to even the series. Now in Winnipeg for Game 3, the Nordiques scored first when a pass in front of the net struck Curt Brackenbury's stick and bounced into the net for what ended up as the only goal for the Nordiques of the game. In the second period, Lindstrom and Labraaten delivered goals for Winnipeg to give them the lead. The third period saw doom for Quebec, which gave up four goals. Winnipeg led early in Game 4, carrying a 2–1 lead into the second period, but the Nordiques struck back, with Francois Lacombe tying the game less than two minutes into the second period. The go-ahead goal was set up on a penalty by Danny Lawson when he hooked Marc Tardif, who soon responded with a slapshot that grazed a defender's stick and rose over the glove of the Jets for the lead. Quebec nearly lost their goaltender Richard Brodeur in the second period when Bobby Hull crashed into him after being pushed by Steve Sutherland that saw Brodeur strike his head on the crossbar. Backup goaltender Serge Aubry was inserted into the game but only played 50 seconds before Brodeur returned. A second goal by Serge Bernier gave Quebec their last goal for a 4–2 victory; the loss ended Winnipeg's streak of 15 straight postseason wins at home, with their last home loss being Game 2 of the 1974 Western Division Semifinals. In the nationally televised (on CBC) Game 5, Quebec scored the first goal of the game four minutes in and scored three more in the span of ten minutes on their way to an 8–3 victory, with Real Cloutier scoring his first goal of the series in the barrage that saw the Bordeleau brothers (Chris and Paulin) each contribute two goals and an assist.

A loud Winnipeg crowd gave the team a two-minute standing ovation that had to see referee Bill Friday chase the team off the ice to get the national anthem started prior to the start of the television broadcast for Game 6. A tough first period saw the Jets lead 4–3, but the rest of the game saw Winnipeg dominate Quebec with hits and shots that saw them score four goals in the second and third periods each. Quebec coach Marc Boileau was incensed enough that Friday ejected him from the bench for his conduct with ten minutes to go in the game; he later told the press that with the circus being in town ten days prior, they "forgot to take back one of their clowns." Boileau received a $500 fine while Friday retorted that "I survived 12 years in that other league and five in this one, and I've never been fired. Can he say the same?" 11,461 people were on hand to watch Game 7 in Quebec. A scoreless first period was credited by Quebec players as key to the rest of the game. Eleven seconds into the second period, Bob Fitchner stole a pass from Ulf Nilsson intended for Anders Hedberg and made a breakaway for a successful shot on Joe Daley to give Quebec the lead. Boileau's decision to use his three heavy defensemen in Curt Brackebury, Steve Sutherland and Fitchner to combat the Winnipeg "Hot Line" of Bobby Hull, Anders Hedberg and Nilsson, paid off, as the line was shut out. 59 seconds after the Fitchner goal, Marc Tardif scored a goal of his own to give Quebec a 2–0 lead as the goal barrage soon became apparent, with even an 80-foot shot by J.C. Tremblay saw Daley mishandle it for a resulting goal. The series-winning goal was scored by Real Cloutier at 6:29 in the second period as Quebec won 8–2. Serge Bernier had 14 goals (tied with teammate Real Cloutier) and a league-leading 22 assists for the postseason (surpassing the previous playoff record of 19 assists held by Bobby Orr in the 1972 Stanley Cup playoffs and Ulf Nilsson in the 1976 WHA playoffs), and which was a mark not matched for one postseason in the WHA or NHL until 1983 when Rick Middleton scored 22 assists and Wayne Gretzky scored 26 assists in the 1983 Stanley Cup playoffs. For his efforts, he was named WHA Playoffs MVP. Boileau publicly felt the championship was a vindication for him, as he had previously been fired by the NHL's Pittsburgh Penguins a year earlier.

May 11	Winnipeg Jets	2–1	Quebec Nordiques	Colisée de Québec	Recap
No scoring		First period	No scoring
2:22 – Dan Labraaten (Dunn); 13:30 – Willy Lindstrom (Labraaten, Sullivan)		Second period	No scoring
No scoring		Third period	7:00 – Paulin Bordeleau
Joe Daley 31 saves / 32 shots		Goalie stats	Richard Brodeur 25 saves / 27 shots

May 15	Winnipeg Jets	1–6	Quebec Nordiques	Colisée de Québec	Recap
No scoring		First period	4:32 – Pierre Guite (Boudrias, Lacombe); 13:25 – Paulin Bordeleau (S. Bernier, Dube); 15:17 – sh – Steve Sutherland; 18:23 – Serge Bernier (Dube, Brackenbury)
No scoring		Second period	7:02 – Curt Brackenbury (S. Bernier, Weir)
2:47 – Dan Labraaten (Lindstrom)		Third period	13:00 – Steve Sutherland (Fitchner, Brackenbury)
Joe Daley 28 saves / 34 shots		Goalie stats	Richard Brodeur 26 saves / 27 shots

May 18	Quebec Nordiques	1–6	Winnipeg Jets	Winnipeg Arena	Recap
2:08 – Curt Brackenbury (Fitchner)		First period	No scoring
No scoring		Second period	4:42 – Willy Lindstrom (Labraaten); 13:16 – Dan Labraaten (Lindstrom)
No scoring		Third period	0:31 – Anders Hedberg (Ford, Daley); 6:16 – Ulf Nilsson; 9:30 – Bill Lesuk (Lindh, Long); 16:33 – Willy Lindstrom (Sullivan, Labraaten)
Richard Brodeur 15 saves / 21 shots		Goalie stats	Joe Daley 23 saves / 24 shots

May 20	Quebec Nordiques	4–2	Winnipeg Jets	Winnipeg Arena	Recap
7:33 – Serge Bernier (P. Bordeleau, J. Bernier)		First period	11:38 – Perry Miller (Sullivan, Labraaten); 17:17 – Ulf Nilsson (Hull, Hedberg)
1:50 – Francois Lacombe (Real Cloutier, Tremblay); 14:53 – Marc Tardif (S. Bernier, C. Bordeleau)		Second period	No scoring
4:32 – Serge Bernier (P. Bordeleau)		Third period	No scoring
Richard Brodeur & Serge Aubry 27 shots / 29 shots		Goalie stats	Joe Daley 23 saves / 27 shots

May 22	Winnipeg Jets	3–8	Quebec Nordiques	Colisée de Québec	Recap
17:04 – Ulf Nilsson (Miller, Hull)		First period	4:23 – Pierre Guite (Boudrias, J. Bernier); 8:49 – Real Cloutier (Tardif, Tremblay); 12:10 – Christian Bordeleau (Cloutier); 14:20 – Paulin Bordeleau (Dube, S. Bernier)
6:39 – Mike Ford (Sullivan, Labraaten); 13:53 – Bobby Hull		Second period	4:18 – Real Cloutier (C. Bordeleau); 6:01 – Paulin Bordeleau (S. Bernier, Tremblay); 11:37 – Christian Bordeleau (Cloutier, S. Bernier)
No scoring		Third period	8:48 – Serge Bernier (P. Bordeleau)
Joe Daley 14 saves / 22 shots		Goalie stats	Richard Brodeur 29 saves / 32 shots

May 24	Quebec Nordiques	3–12	Winnipeg Jets	Winnipeg Arena	Recap
3:02 – Real Cloutier; 4:28 – Real Cloutier (Tardif, C. Bordeleau); 16:35 – Christian Bordeleau (Tardif, Cloutier)		First period	1:26 – pp – Bobby Hull (Nilsson, Ford); 9:17 – Dan Labraaten (Sullivan, Lindstrom); 12:09 – Anders Hedberg (Nilsson); 13:47 – Bob Guindon (Huck, Miller)
No scoring		Second period	6:28 – Bobby Hull (Guindon, Dunn); 8:04 – Peter Sullivan (Labraaten); 16:57 – pp – Mike Ford (Sjoberg, Hedberg); 17:30 – Bob Guindon (Long, Huck)
No scoring		Third period	2:21 – Peter Sullivan (Labraaten); 3:37 – Anders Hedberg (Nilsson, Miller); 5:20 – Willy Lindstrom (Sullivan); 12:36 – Bobby Hull (Nilsson, Hedberg)
Richard Brodeur & Serge Aubry 30 saves / 42 shots		Goalie stats	Joe Daley 21 saves / 24 shots

May 26	Winnipeg Jets	2–8	Quebec Nordiques	Colisée de Québec	Recap
No scoring		First period	No scoring
8:39 – Dan Labraaten (Ford, Sullivan)		Second period	0:11 – Bob Fitchner; 1:10 – Marc Tardif (Cloutier, C. Bordeleau); 6:29 – Real Cloutier (Tardif, Lariviere); 9:24 – J. C. Tremblay (Cloutier, Tardif); 15:23 – Norm Dube (Lariviere, S. Bernier); 18:41 – Paulin Bordeleau (S. Bernier, Lacombe)
14:09 – Perry Miller (Nilsson, Hedberg)		Third period	1:39 – Christian Bordeleau (Cloutier, Lacombe); 3:39 – Serge Bernier (Dube, Lariviere)
Joe Daley 17 saves / 25 shots		Goalie stats	Richard Brodeur 25 saves / 27 shots

Quebec won series 4–3

== Statistical leaders ==
=== Skaters ===
These were the top ten skaters based on points.

Player	Team	GP	G	A	Pts	+-	PIM
Serge Bernier	Quebec Nordiques	17	14	22	36	16	10
Anders Hedberg	Winnipeg Jets	20	13	16	29	6	13
Real Cloutier	Quebec Nordiques	17	14	13	27	11	10
Ulf Nilsson	Winnipeg Jets	20	6	21	27	5	33
Dan Labraaten	Winnipeg Jets	20	7	17	24	8	15
Bobby Hull	Winnipeg Jets	20	13	9	22	6	2
Paulin Bordeleau	Quebec Nordiques	16	12	9	21	12	12
Peter Sullivan	Winnipeg Jets	20	7	12	19	5	2
Terry Ruskowski	Houston Aeros	11	6	11	17	8	67
Mike Ford	Winnipeg Jets	20	3	13	16	7	12
Reg Thomas	Indianapolis Racers	9	7	9	16	8	4

=== Goaltending ===
Player	Team	GP	GA	SA	SV	SV%	SO	MIN
Joe Daley	Winnipeg Jets	20	71	569	498	.875	1	1,186
Richard Brodeur	Quebec Nordiques	17	55	465	410	.882	1	1,007
Ron Grahame	Houston Aeros	9	36	265	229	.864	0	561
Paul Hoganson	Indianapolis Racers	5	17	179	162	.905	1	348
Norm LaPointe	Cincinnati Stingers	4	16	124	108	.871	0	273
Ken Lockett	San Diego Mariners	5	19	146	127	.870	0	260

== Championship roster ==
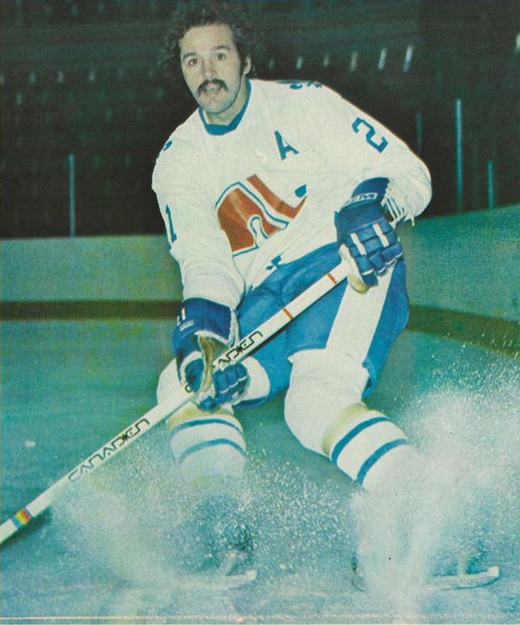
Serge Bernier won the WHA Playoff MVP for Quebec.

1976–77 Quebec Nordiques

=== Players ===
Centres

- Bob Fitchner
- Christian Bordeleau
- Andre Boudrias
- Serge Bernier

Wingers

- Charles Constantin
- Pierre Guite
- Steve Sutherland
- Marc Tardif (Captain)
- Norm Dube
- Curt Brackenbury
- Paulin Bordeleau
- Real Cloutier

Defencemen

- Michel Dubois
- Jean Bernier
- Jim Dorey
- Paul Baxter
- Wally Weir
- Francois Lacombe
- Garry Lariviere
- J. C. Tremblay

Goaltenders

- Serge Aubry
- Richard Brodeur
- Ed Humphreys (did not play in playoffs)

=== Coaching and administrative staff ===
- Marc Boileau (head coach)
- Maurice Filion (general manager)
