= List of WHA statistical leaders =

The following is a historical list of World Hockey Association (WHA) statistical leaders, which lasted from 1972 to 1979 as a professional hockey league in North America. It merged with the National Hockey League in 1979. While the NHL does not recognize the statistics of the WHA, Hockey Reference lists all available statistics of the WHA side-by-side with the NHL.

== Skaters ==
=== Regular season: Points ===
| Inducted into the Hockey Hall of Fame |

| Rank | Name | Team(s) | Years | Pts | Games Played |
|---|---|---|---|---|---|
| 1 | André Lacroix | PHB, NYJ/SDM, HSA, NEW | 1972–1979 | 798 | 551 |
| 2 | Marc Tardif | LAS/MIB, QBN | 1973–1979 | 666 | 446 |
| 3 | Bobby Hull | WNJ | 1972–1979 | 638 | 411 |
| 4 | Serge Bernier | QBN | 1973–1979 | 566 | 417 |
| 4 | Réal Cloutier | QBN | 1974–1979 | 566 | 369 |
| 6 | Robbie Ftorek | PHR, CNS | 1974–1979 | 523 | 373 |
| 7 | Gordie Howe | HSA, NEW | 1973–1979 | 508 | 419 |
| 8 | Christian Bordeleau | WNJ, QBN | 1972–1979 | 504 | 412 |
| 8 | Mark Howe | HSA, NEW | 1973–1979 | 504 | 426 |
| 10 | Ulf Nilsson | WNJ | 1974–1978 | 484 | 300 |
| 11 | Anders Hedberg | WNJ | 1974–1978 | 458 | 286 |
| 12 | Larry Lund | HSA | 1972–1978 | 426 | 459 |
| 13 | Tom Webster | NEW | 1972–1978 | 425 | 352 |
| 14 | J.C. Tremblay | QBN | 1972–1979 | 424 | 454 |
| 15 | Danny Lawson | PHB/VNB/CGB, WNJ | 1972–1978 | 422 | 392 |
| 16 | John McKenzie | PHB/VNB, MFS, CNS, NEW | 1972–1979 | 413 | 477 |
| 17 | Michel Parizeau | QBN, INR, CNS | 1972–1979 | 394 | 509 |
| 18 | Rich LeDuc | CLC, CNS, INR, QBN | 1974–1979 | 390 | 394 |
| 19 | Ron Ward | NYW, VNB/CGC, LAS, CLC, MNF, WNJ | 1972–1978 | 380 | 359 |
| 20 | Bryan Campbell | VNB, CNS, INR, EDO | 1972–1978 | 376 | 433 |
| 21 | Larry Pleau | NEW | 1972–1979 | 372 | 468 |
| 22 | Mike Antonovich | MFS, EDO, NEW | 1972–1979 | 370 | 486 |
| 23 | Rosaire Paiement | CHC, NEW, INR | 1972–1978 | 367 | 455 |
| 23 | Mike Rogers | EDO, NEW | 1974–1979 | 367 | 396 |
| 25 | Norm Ferguson | NYR/SDM, EDO | 1972–1978 | 365 | 436 |
| 26 | Gavin Kirk | OTN/TRT/BRB, CGC, EDO | 1972–1979 | 359 | 422 |
| 27 | Frank Hughes | HSA, PHR | 1972–1978 | 353 | 392 |
| 28 | Tim Sheehy | NEW, EDO, BRB | 1972–1978 | 351 | 433 |
| 29 | Terry Ruskowski | HSA, WNJ | 1974–1979 | 337 | 369 |
| 30 | Blair MacDonald | EDO INR | 1973–1979 | 336 | 476 |
| 31 | Wayne Rivers | NYW/NYJ/SDM | 1972–1978 | 334 | 357 |
| 32 | Dennis Sobchuk | PHR, CNS, EDO | 1974–1979 | 331 | 348 |
| 33 | Gene Peacosh | NYW/NYJ/SDM, EDO, INR | 1972–1978 | 330 | 367 |
| 33 | Ron Chipperfield | VNB/CGC, EDO | 1974–1979 | 330 | 369 |
| 35 | Wayne Connelly | MFS, CLC, CGC, EDO | 1972–1978 | 329 | 366 |
| 35 | Ron Plumb | PHB/VNB, SDM, CNS, NEW | 1972–1979 | 329 | 549 |
| 37 | Poul Popiel | HSA | 1972–1978 | 327 | 467 |
| 38 | Kevin Morrison | NYJ/SDM, INR, QBN | 1973–1979 | 317 | 418 |
| 39 | Wayne Carleton | OTN/TRT/BRB, NEW, EDO | 1972–1978 | 312 | 290 |
| 40 | Al Hamilton | EDO | 1972–1979 | 311 | 455 |
| 40 | Rene LeClerc | QBN, INR | 1972–1979 | 311 | 452 |
| 42 | Paul Shmyr | CLC, SDM, EDO | 1972–1979 | 309 | 511 |
| 43 | John French | NEW, SDM, INR | 1972–1978 | 300 | 420 |
| 44 | Peter Sullivan | WNJ | 1975–1979 | 295 | 313 |
| 45 | John Gray | PHR, HSA, WNJ | 1974–1979 | 292 | 363 |
| 46 | Dave Keon | MFS, INR, NEW | 1975–1979 | 291 | 301 |
| 47 | Ed Patenaude | EDO INR | 1972–1978 | 290 | 431 |
| 48 | Ted Taylor | HSA | 1972–1978 | 287 | 421 |
| 49 | Rich Preston | HSA, WNJ | 1974–1979 | 285 | 388 |
| 50 | Jim Dorey | NEW, TRT, QBN | 1972–1979 | 284 | 431 |

==== Regular season: Points per game ====
Minimum 500 points

1. Bobby Hull, 1.552
2. Réal Cloutier, 1.534
3. Marc Tardif, 1.493
4. André Lacroix, 1.448
5. Robbie Ftorek, 1.402
6. Serge Bernier, 1.357
7. Christian Bordeleau, 1.223
8. Gordie Howe, 1.212
9. Mark Howe, 1.183

==== Regular season: Points in one game ====
| Rank | Name | Date | Team | Points | Goals | Assists |
|---|---|---|---|---|---|---|
| 1 | Jim Harrison | January 30, 1973 | Alberta Oilers | 10 | 3 | 7 |
| 2 | Ron Ward | November 30, 1975 | Cleveland Crusaders | 7 | 5 | 2 |
| 3 | Real Cloutier | December 26, 1976 | Quebec Nordiques | 7 | 3 | 4 |
| 4 | Danny Lawson | January 13, 1973 | Philadelphia Blazers | 7 | 3 | 4 |
| 5 | Ron Ward | January 4, 1973 | New York Raiders | 6 | 5 | 1 |
| 6 | Perry Miller | February 1, 1977 | Winnipeg Jets | 6 | 4 | 2 |
| 7 | Anders Hedberg | February 4, 1977 | Winnipeg Jets | 6 | 4 | 2 |
| 8 | Bobby Hull | February 15, 1973 | Winnipeg Jets | 6 | 4 | 2 |
| 9 | Anders Hedberg | January 19, 1975 | Winnipeg Jets | 6 | 4 | 2 |
| 10 | Mike Walton | March 9, 1974 | Minnesota Fighting Saints | 6 | 4 | 2 |

==== Playoffs: Points ====
1. Mark Howe: 92
2. Bobby Hull: 80
3. Serge Bernier: 74
4. Gordie Howe: 71
5. Ulf Nilsson: 67
6. Larry Lund: 65
7. Réal Cloutier: 63
8. Anders Hedberg: 63
9. Marc Tardif: 59
10. Poul Popiel: 54
11. Tom Webster: 54
12. Terry Ruskowski: 54
13. Peter Sullivan: 53
14. Larry Pleau: 51
15. Christian Bordeleau: 50
16. Willy Lindström: 48
17. Gord Labossiere: 44
18. André Lacroix: 43
19. Bobby Guindon: 43
20. Mike Antonovich: 41

=== Regular season: Goals ===
| Inducted into the Hockey Hall of Fame |

| Rank | Name | Goals | GP |
|---|---|---|---|
| 1 | Marc Tardif | 316 | 446 |
| 2. | Bobby Hull | 303 | 411 |
| 3. | Réal Cloutier | 283 | 369 |
| 4. | André Lacroix | 251 | 551 |
| 5. | Anders Hedberg | 236 | 286 |
| 6. | Serge Bernier | 230 | 417 |
| 7. | Tom Webster | 220 | 352 |
| 8. | Danny Lawson | 218 | 392 |
| 9. | Robbie Ftorek | 216 | 373 |
| 10. | Mark Howe | 208 | 426 |
| 11. | Rich LeDuc | 195 | 394 |
| 12. | Mike Antonovich | 182 | 486 |
| 13. | Norm Ferguson | 181 | 436 |
| 14. | Christian Bordeleau | 179 | 412 |
| 15. | Tim Sheehy | 178 | 433 |
| 16. | Gordie Howe | 174 | 419 |
| 17. | Frank Hughes | 173 | 392 |
| 18. | Blair MacDonald | 171 | 476 |
| 19. | Ron Ward | 170 | 359 |
| 20. | Wayne Connelly | 167 | 366 |
| 21. | Gene Peacosh | 165 | 367 |
| 22. | John McKenzie | 163 | 477 |
| 23. | Ed Patenaude | 159 | 431 |
| 24. | Wayne Rivers | 158 | 357 |
| 25. | Larry Pleau | 157 | 468 |

==== Regular season: Goals per game ====
Minimum: 200 goals

1. Anders Hedberg, 0.825
2. Réal Cloutier, 0.767
3. Bobby Hull, 0.737
4. Marc Tardif, 0.709
5. Tom Wesbter, 0.625
6. Robbie Ftorek, 0.579
7. Danny Lawson, 0.556
8. Serge Bernier, 0.552
9. Mark Howe, 0.488
10. André Lacroix, 0.456

==== Playoffs: Goals ====
1. Bobby Hull, 43
2. Mark Howe, 41
3. Anders Hedberg, 35
4. Réal Cloutier, 33
5. Larry Pleau, 29
6. Tom Webster, 28
7. Gordie Howe, 28
8. Serge Bernier, 28
9. Marc Tardif, 27
10. Willy Lindström, 26
11. Frank Hughes, 24
12. Bob Guindon, 24
13. Mike Antonovich, 21
14. Peter Sullivan, 21
15. Murray Hall, 21
16. Larry Lund, 20
17. Blair MacDonald, 20
18. Mike Walton, 20
19. Norm Beaudin, 18
20. Ted Taylor, 18
21. Terry Ruskowski, 18

==== Regular season: Power Play goals ====
1. Réal Cloutier, 87
2. Bobby Hull, 82
3. André Lacroix, 76
4. Marc Tardif, 69
5. Anders Hedberg, 68
6. Robbie Ftorek, 59
7. Gordie Howe, 57
8. Serge Bernier, 51
9. Tom Webster, 50
10. Ron Chipperfield, 48
11. Mark Howe, 47
12. Frank Hughes, 44
13. Danny Lawson, 40
14. Wayne Rivers, 39
15. George Morrison, 39
16. Larry Lund, 38
17. Wayne Connelly, 38
18. Réjean Houle, 38
19. Morris Lukowich, 35
20. André Hinse, 35
21. Gene Peacosh, 35
22. Larry Pleau, 35
23. Norm Ferguson, 35
24. Willy Lindström, 34
25. Mark Napier, 33

=== Regular season: Assists ===
| Inducted into the Hockey Hall of Fame |

| Rank | Name | Assists | GP |
|---|---|---|---|
| 1 | André Lacroix | 547 | 551 |
| 2 | J.C. Tremblay | 358 | 454 |
| 3 | Marc Tardif | 350 | 446 |
| 4 | Ulf Nilsson | 344 | 300 |
| 5 | Serge Bernier | 336 | 417 |
| 6 | Bobby Hull | 335 | 411 |
| 7 | Gordie Howe | 334 | 419 |
| 8 | Christian Bordeleau | 325 | 412 |
| 9 | Robbie Ftorek | 307 | 373 |
| 10 | Mark Howe | 296 | 426 |
| 11 | Réal Cloutier | 283 | 369 |
| 12 | Larry Lund | 277 | 459 |
| 13 | Poul Popiel | 265 | 467 |
| 14 | Ron Plumb | 264 | 549 |
| 15 | Al Hamilton | 258 | 455 |
| 16 | Terry Ruskowski | 254 | 369 |
| 17 | Bryan Campbell | 253 | 433 |
| 18 | Michel Parizeau | 252 | 509 |
| 19 | John McKenzie | 250 | 477 |
| 20 | Paul Shmyr | 248 | 511 |
| 21 | Gavin Kirk | 243 | 422 |
| 22 | Jim Dorey | 232 | 431 |
| 23 | Kevin Morrison | 224 | 418 |
| 24 | Anders Hedberg | 222 | 286 |
| 25 | Mike Rogers | 222 | 396 |

==== Regular season: Assists per game ====
Minimum: 200 assists

1. Ulf Nilsson, 1.147
2. Andre Lacroix, 0.993
3. Robbie Ftorek, 0.823
4. Bobby Hull, 0.815
5. Serge Bernier, 0.806
6. Gordie Howe, 0.797
7. Christian Bordeleau, 0.789
8. J.C. Tremblay, 0.789
9. Marc Tardif, 0.785

==== Playoffs: Assists ====
1. Ulf Nilsson, 53
2. Mark Howe, 51
3. Poul Popiel, 47
4. Serge Bernier, 46
5. Larry Lund, 45
6. Gordie Howe, 43
7. Bobby Hull, 37
8. Terry Ruskowski, 36
9. Christian Bordeleau, 34
10. Jim Dorey, 33
11. Rick Ley, 33
12. Marc Tardif, 32
13. Peter Sullivan, 32
14. Réal Cloutier, 30
15. André Lacroix, 29
16. Gord Labossiere, 28
17. Anders Hedberg, 28
18. Tom Webster, 26
19. John French, 25
20. John Schella, 25
21. Mike Ford, 25
22. J.C. Tremblay, 23
23. Dave Keon, 23

=== Regular season: Games played (skaters) ===
1. Andre Lacroix, 551
2. Ron Plumb, 549
3. Paul Shmyr, 511
4. Michel Parizeau, 509
5. Mike Antonovich, 486
6. Rick Ley, 478
7. John McKenzie, 477
8. Blair MacDonald, 476
9. Larry Pleau, 468
10. Poul Popiel, 467
11. Bob Guindon, 463
12. Larry Lund, 459
13. Al Hamilton, 455
14. Rosaire Paiement, 455
15. Ken Block, 455
16. J.C. Tremblay, 454
17. Ted Green, 452
18. Rene Leclerc, 452
19. Marty Howe, 449
20. Don Burgess, 446
21. Marc Tardif, 446
22. François Lacombe,440
23. Norm Ferguson, 436
24. Bryan Campbell, 433
25. Tim Sheehy, 433

==== Regular season: Penalty minutes ====
1. Paul Baxter, 962
2. Kim Clackson, 932
3. Cam Connor, 904
4. Pierre Roy, 860
5. Paul Shmyr, 860
6. Gord Gallant, 849
7. John Schella, 844
8. Steve Sutherland, 805
9. John Hughes, 778
10. Ron Busniuk, 762
11. Terry Ruskowski, 761
12. Curt Brackenbury, 753
13. Rick Ley, 716
14. Jack Carlson, 694
15. Glen Irwin, 633
16. Doug Barrie, 620
17. John McKenzie, 619
18. Poul Popiel, 618
19. Jim Dorey, 617
20. Frank Beaton, 614
21. Ted Taylor, 600
22. Rosaire Paiement, 592
23. Pierre Guite, 585
24. Peter Driscoll, 577
25. Gilles Bilodeau, 570
26. Butch Deadmarsh, 570

== Goaltenders ==
=== Regular season: Games played ===
1. Ernie Wakely, 334
2. Don McLeod, 332
3. John Garrett, 323
4. Joe Daley, 308
5. Richard Brodeur, 305
6. Al Smith, 260
7. Dave Dryden, 242
8. Gerry Cheevers, 191
9. Jack Norris, 191
10. Gary Kurt, 176
11. Wayne Rutledge, 175
12. Gilles Gratton, 161
13. Michel Dion, 149
14. Ron Grahame, 143
15. Paul Hoganson, 143
16. Serge Aubry, 142
17. Mike Curran, 130
18. Bruce Landon, 122
19. Russ Gillow, 109
20. Wayne Wood, 104
21. Christer Abrahamsson, 102
22. Cam Newton, 102
23. Pete Donnelly, 100
24. Bob Whidden, 98
25. Jim McLeod, 97

==== Regular season: Wins ====
1. Joe Daley, 167
2. Richard Brodeur, 165
3. Ernie Wakely, 164
4. Don McLeod, 155
5. John Garrett, 148
6. Al Smith, 141
7. Dave Dryden, 112
8. Ron Grahame, 102
9. Gerry Cheevers, 99
10. Wayne Rutledge, 94
11. Jack Norris, 86
12. Gilles Gratton, 81
13. Gary Kurt, 72
14. Serge Aubry, 65
15. Mike Curran, 63
16. Michel Dion, 62
17. Bruce Landon, 50
18. Cam Newton, 48
19. Paul Hoganson, 44
20. Pete Donnelly, 44
21. Christer Abrahamsson, 41
22. Wayne Wood, 39
23. Jean-Louis Levasseur, 37
24. Russ Gillow, 37
25. Bob Whidden, 34

==== Regular season: Shutouts ====
A goaltender achieves a shutout when he does not allow a goal against him and plays the full game.

1. Ernie Wakely, 16
2. John Garrett, 14
3. Gerry Cheevers, 14
4. Joe Daley, 12
5. Ron Grahame, 12
6. Don McLeod, 11
7. Al Smith, 10
8. Richard Brodeur, 8
9. Dave Dryden, 8
10. Mike Curran, 7
11. Wayne Rutledge, 6
12. Jean-Louis Levasseur, 5
13. Jack Norris, 5
14. Paul Hoganson, 5
15. Michel Dion, 5
16. Pete Donnelly, 5
17. Ken Broderick, 4
18. Serge Aubry, 4
19. Gilles Gratton, 4
20. Russ Gillow, 4

==== Regular season: Goals against average ====
Goals against average is the average number of goals a goaltender allows over a 60-minute period (the regulation length of a game). It is calculated by multiplying the goals against by 60 minutes, then dividing by the total minutes played.

Minimum 250 games played

1. Al Smith, 3.252
2. Ernie Wakely, 3.302
3. Don McLeod, 3.326
4. Joe Daley, 3.371
5. John Garrett, 3.520
6. Richard Brodeur, 3.638

==== Regular season: Saves ====
1. John Garrett, 9382
2. Ernie Wakely, 8884
3. Richard Brodeur, 8341
4. Joe Daley, 8065
5. Don McLeod, 8022
6. Al Smith, 6629
7. Dave Dryden, 6274
8. Gerry Cheevers, 5612
9. Jack Norris, 5067
10. Wayne Rutledge, 4760
11. Gilles Gratton, 4449
12. Gary Kurt, 4429
13. Mike Curran, 3924
14. Ron Grahame, 3839
15. Michel Dion, 3664

==== Playoffs: Games played ====
1. Richard Brodeur, 51
2. Joe Daley, 49
3. Ron Grahame, 36
4. Al Smith, 35
5. John Garrett, 32
6. Don McLeod, 31
7. Ernie Wakely, 31
8. Gerry Cheevers, 19
9. Dave Dryden, 18
10. Wayne Rutledge, 16
11. Cap Raeder, 15
12. Gilles Gratton, 13
13. Cam Newton, 11
14. Andre Gill, 11
15. Jack Norris, 10
16. Gary Smith, 10
17. Les Binkley, 10
18. Russ Gillow, 9
19. Bruce Landon, 8

==== Playoffs: Shutouts ====
1. Ron Grahame, 4
2. Richard Brodeur, 3
3. Joe Daley, 2
4. Ernie Wakely, 2
5. Jim Park, 2
6. Cap Raeder, 2
7. Gilles Gratton, 1
8. Don McLeod, 1
9. Al Smith, 1
10. John Garrett, 1
11. Paul Hoganson, 1

==== Playoffs: Goals allowed ====
1. Richard Brodeur, 177
2. Joe Daley, 149
3. Al Smith, 124
4. John Garrett, 124
5. Ron Grahame, 116
6. Ernie Wakely, 109
7. Don McLeod, 96
8. Gerry Cheevers, 63
9. Dave Dryden, 63
10. Wayne Rutledge, 42
11. Les Binkley, 40
12. Cam Newton, 40
13. Cap Raeder, 38
14. Andre Gill, 38
15. Gilles Gratton, 37

== Coaches ==
=== Regular season: Games coached ===
1. Bill Dineen, 545
2. Harry Neale, 404
3. Jacques Demers, 311
4. Terry Slater, 258
5. Joe Crozier, 239
6. Ron Ingram, 212
7. Billy Harris, 197
8. Pat Stapleton, 181
9. Glen Sather, 178
10. Glen Sonmor, 178

=== Regular season: Coaching wins ===
1. Bill Dineen, 318
2. Harry Neale, 208
3. Jacques Demers, 144
4. Terry Slater, 116
5. Joe Crozier, 109
6. Billy Harris, 99
7. Bobby Kromm, 98
8. Jean-Guy Gendron, 96
9. Glen Sather, 95
10. Ron Ingram, 92

=== Regular season: Coaching points percentage ===
Points percentage is determined by the number of points a team earns (equal to the number of ties, plus twice the number of wins) divided by the total possible points (equal to twice the number of games).

Minimum 200 games coached

1. Bill Dineen, .609
2. Harry Neale, .541
3. Jacques Demers, .498
4. Joe Crozier, .483
5. Terry Slater, .473
6. Ron Ingram, .467

=== Playoffs: Games coached ===
1. Bill Dineen, 71
2. Harry Neale, 65
3. Bobby Kromm, 33
4. Glen Sather, 23
5. Jack Kelley, 21
6. Jacques Demers, 20
7. Jean-Guy Gendron, 20
8. Bobby Hull, 18
9. Ron Ingram, 18
10. Pat Stapleton, 18

=== Playoffs: Coaching wins ===
1. Bill Dineen, 44
2. Harry Neale, 32
3. Bobby Kromm, 23
4. Jack Kelley, 14
5. Marc Boileau, 12
6. Jean-Guy Gendron, 9
7. Bobby Hull, 9
8. Jacques Demers, 8
9. Billy Harris, 8
10. Larry Hillman, 8
11. Ron Ingram, 8
12. Tom McVie, 8
13. Glen Sather, 8
14. Pat Stapleton, 8

=== Playoffs: Coaching win percentage ===
Minimum 20 games coached

1. Bobby Kromm, .697
2. Jack Kelley, .667
3. Bill Dineen, .620
4. Harry Neale, .492
5. Jean-Guy Gendron, .450
6. Jacques Demers, .400
7. Glen Sather, .348

=== Playoffs: Avco World Trophy championships ===
1. Bill Dineen, 2
2. Marc Boileau, 1
3. Larry Hillman, 1
4. Jack Kelley, 1
5. Bobby Kromm, 1
6. Tom McVie, 1
