= Avco World Trophy =

Championship trophy of the now-defunct World Hockey Association

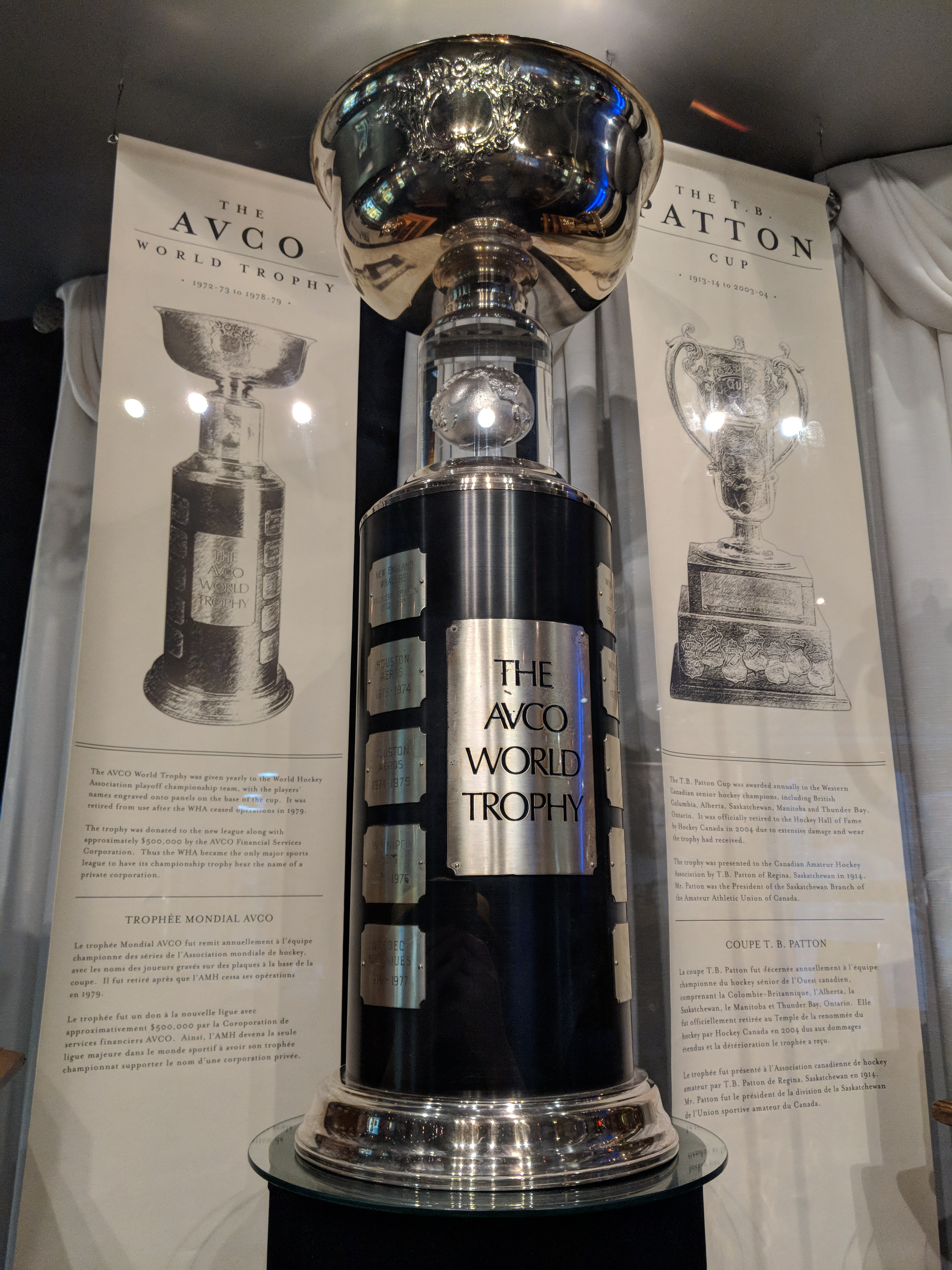
- Sport: Ice hockey
- Competition: World Hockey Association
- Awarded for: Playoff championship of the WHA

History
- First award: 1973
- Editions: 7
- Final award: 1979
- First winner: New England Whalers
- Most wins: Winnipeg Jets (3)
- Most recent: Winnipeg Jets

The Avco World Trophy, also known as the Avco Cup, is the playoff championship trophy of the defunct World Hockey Association, which operated from 1972 until 1979. The trophy's naming rights were sold to the former Avco Corporation (a name originally derived from "Aviation Company"), a defense contractor who bought the rights to advertise their consumer finance division. The trophy was mocked by some for its corporate sponsorship and never developed anything approaching the significance and sentiment of the Stanley Cup, its National Hockey League rival. Still, the cup's design was often seen as creative in that it involved a freely-floating etched crystal globe embedded in the "stem" of the cup. The cup was designed by Frank Bonnerkopf of Boise, Idaho.

The trophy was donated to the new league in 1972 along with approximately $500,000 by the Avco Financial Services Corporation, and became the first major sports league championship trophy to bear the name of a private corporation. Three Avco trophies exist; besides the one that is on display at the Hockey Hall of Fame, the others are in Winnipeg at the Manitoba Sports Hall of Fame and Museum, and in the Nova Scotia Sports Hall of Fame in Halifax. The trophy was retired after the WHA ceased operations in 1979. Led by Bobby Hull, the Winnipeg Jets claimed the trophy on three occasions, including the final league championship against Wayne Gretzky and the Edmonton Oilers. Gordie Howe and the Houston Aeros vied for the trophy three times, winning twice.

The Avco Trophy in fact may have been most famous, or perhaps infamous, in its absence. When the New England Whalers won the league's inaugural championship in 1973 the trophy had not yet been completed, and the Whalers were forced to skate their divisional championship trophy around the ice surface. On some occasions, the winning players were given miniature Avco Cup trophies, which often had a plate engraved with the names of the winners that could also include team doctors or chairmen of the board, as was the case with the inscriptions of the two Avco Trophies won by the Houston Aeros.

Eight players skated for three Avco World Trophy-winning teams in the WHA playoffs: Joe Daley, Ted Green, Bob Guindon, Bill Lesuk, Lyle Moffat, Lars-Erik Sjoberg, Willy Lindstrom and Peter Sullivan. All but Green did so as members of the three Winnipeg Jets championship teams, whereas Green did so with the 1972–73 Whalers and the first two Jets championship teams. Green was the first to win the Trophy with multiple teams. Bobby Hull is commonly cited as winning the Avco Trophy three times with the Jets as well, but he did not play in the 1979 playoff run due to injury.

Location of WHA champions and the number of titles they won: 1-white 2-blue 3-green *denotes did not join NHL

== Champions and finalists ==
Season	Winning team	Coach	Games	Losing team	Coach	Winning goal
1973	New England Whalers	Jack Kelley	4–1	Winnipeg Jets	Bobby Hull	Larry Pleau (5:44, third)
1974	Houston Aeros	Bill Dineen	4–0	Chicago Cougars	Pat Stapleton	Murray Hall (16:55, first)
1975	Houston Aeros	Bill Dineen	4–0	Quebec Nordiques	Jean-Guy Gendron	Gord Labossiere (19:53, first)
1976	Winnipeg Jets	Bobby Kromm	4–0	Houston Aeros	Bill Dineen	Veli-Pekka Ketola (10:22, first)
1977	Quebec Nordiques	Marc Boileau	4–3	Winnipeg Jets	Bobby Kromm	Real Cloutier (6:29, second)
1978	Winnipeg Jets	Larry Hillman	4–0	New England Whalers	Harry Neale	Bobby Hull (3:26, third)
1979	Winnipeg Jets	Tom McVie	4–2	Edmonton Oilers	Glen Sather	Lyle Moffat (6:35, second)

== List of WHA playoff overtime games ==
In the seven-year postseason history of the WHA, 21 games went into overtime. Notably, no championship game ever reached overtime.

Season	Date	Round	Winning team	Overtime goal scored by
1973	April 4	Eastern Division Semifinals	Cleveland Crusaders	Ron Buchanan (9:44)
1973	April 8	Eastern Division Semifinals	New England Whalers	Brit Selby (3:37)
1973	April 11	Western Division Semifinals	Winnipeg Jets	Norm Beaudin (3:12)
1973	April 13	Western Division Semifinals	Houston Aeros	Murray Hall (3:38)
1973	April 14	Eastern Division Semifinals	New England Whalers	Mike Byers (3:47)
1974	April 7	Eastern Division Semifinals	New England Whalers	John French (2:51)
1974	April 10	Eastern Division Semifinals	Chicago Cougars	Ralph Backstrom (17:45)
1974	April 13	Eastern Division Semifinals	Cleveland Crusaders	Wayne Muloin (4:17)
1974	April 18	Western Division Finals	Minnesota Fighting Saints	Mike Walton (1:40)
1975	April 11	Quarterfinals	New England Whalers	Rick Ley (6:46)
1975	April 15	Quarterfinals	Phoenix Roadrunners	Michel Cormier (7:21)
1975	May 1	Semifinals	Houston Aeros	Jim Sherrit (0:27)
1976	April 9	Preliminary Round	Phoenix Roadrunners	Del Hall (0:31)
1976	April 11	Quarterfinals	Winnipeg Jets	Ulf Nilsson (0:54)
1977	April 9	Eastern Division Semifinals	Indianapolis Racers	Gene Peacosh (8:40, 3OT)
1977	April 13	Western Division Semifinals	Houston Aeros	Morris Lukowich (13:11)
1977	April 14	Eastern Division Semifinals	Quebec Nordiques	Paul Baxter (1:50)
1977	April 26	Western Division Finals	Winnipeg Jets	Peter Sullivan (8:05)
1977	April 28	Eastern Division Finals	Quebec Nordiques	Paulin Bordeleau (5:29)
1978	April 16	WHA Quarterfinals	Houston Aeros	Ted Taylor (7:19)
1978	April 18	WHA Quarterfinals	Quebec Nordiques	Marc Tardif (2:59)
