= Ken Lockett =

Canadian ice hockey player

- Born: August 30, 1947 (age 78) Toronto, Ontario, Canada
- Height: 6 ft 0 in (183 cm)
- Weight: 160 lb (73 kg; 11 st 6 lb)
- Position: Goaltender
- Caught: Left
- Played for: WHA; San Diego Mariners; NHL; Vancouver Canucks; AHL; Baltimore Clippers
- NHL draft: Undrafted
- Playing career: 1972–1977

Kenneth Richard Lockett (born August 30, 1947) is a Canadian retired professional ice hockey goaltender who played for the Vancouver Canucks of the National Hockey League (NHL) and the San Diego Mariners of the World Hockey Association (WHA).

== Playing career ==
Lockett played university hockey in Canada with the Guelph Gryphons of the CIAU for one season before turning pro with the Baltimore Clippers of the American Hockey League (AHL) in 1972–73. After two seasons in the AHL, Lockett joined the Vancouver Canucks of the National Hockey League (NHL) where he played backup to Gary Smith. In his first year with the Canucks, he recorded 2 consecutive shutouts as part of a franchise record setting 184:20 minute shutout streak in April 1975. The mark stood as a Canucks record for 32 years until 2007 when Roberto Luongo went 210:34 minutes. Following his second season with the Canucks, he left to join the NHL-rival-league World Hockey Association (WHA) with the San Diego Mariners.

== Career statistics ==
=== Regular season and playoffs ===
			Regular season									Playoffs
Season	Team	League	GP	W	L	T	MIN	GA	SO	GAA	SV%	GP	W	L	MIN	GA	SO	GAA	SV%
1968–69	Fort Wayne Komets	IHL	6	—	—	—	300	28	0	5.60	—	—	—	—	—	—	—	—	—
1969–70	Fort Wayne Komets	IHL	2	—	—	—	120	10	0	5.00	—	—	—	—	—	—	—	—	—
1969–70	Owen Sound Mercurys	OHA	9	—	—	—	520	45	0	5.19	—	—	—	—	—	—	—	—	—
1970–71	University of Guelph	CIAU	15	–	–	–	900	54	0	3.60	—	—	—	—	—	—	—	—	—
1971–72	University of Guelph	CIAU	17	–	–	–	1020	64	0	3.76	—	—	—	—	—	—	—	—	—
1972–73	Baltimore Clippers	AHL	32	–	–	–	1809	139	0	4.57	—	—	—	—	—	—	—	—	—
1973–74	Baltimore Clippers	AHL	37	21	11	4	2128	99	2	2.79	—	5	3	2	300	18	0	3.60	—
1974–75	Vancouver Canucks	NHL	25	6	7	1	912	48	2	3.16	.886	1	0	1	60	6	0	6.00	.846
1975–76	Vancouver Canucks	NHL	30	7	8	7	1436	83	0	3.47	.892	—	—	—	—	—	—	—	—
1976–77	San Diego Mariners	WHA	45	18	19	1	2397	148	1	3.70	.871	5	1	3	260	19	0	4.38	—
WHA totals			45	18	19	1	2397	148	1	3.70	.871	5	1	3	260	19	0	4.38	—
NHL totals			55	13	15	8	2348	131	2	3.35	.890	1	0	1	60	6	0	6.00	.846
