= Mark Lomenda =

Canadian ice hockey player

- Born: April 14, 1954 (age 72)
- Height: 6 ft 0 in (183 cm)
- Weight: 186 lb (84 kg; 13 st 4 lb)
- Position: Right wing
- Shot: Right
- Played for: Chicago Cougars; Denver Spurs; Ottawa Civics; Indianapolis Racers
- NHL draft: 74th overall, 1974; Kansas City Scouts
- WHA draft: 33rd overall, 1974; Chicago Cougars
- Playing career: 1974–1979

Mark Wesley Thomas Lomenda (Born April 14, 1954) is a Canadian former professional ice hockey forward. He played 164 games in the World Hockey Association with the Chicago Cougars, Denver Spurs, Ottawa Civics and Indianapolis Racers.

== Career statistics ==
=== Regular season and playoffs ===
			Regular season					Playoffs
Season	Team	League	GP	G	A	Pts	PIM	GP	G	A	Pts	PIM
1971–72	Calgary Canucks	AJHL	48	35	35	70	61	—	—	—	—	—
1972–73	Calgary Canucks	AJHL	54	52	66	118	63	—	—	—	—	—
1973–74	Victoria Cougars	WCHL	68	20	48	68	59	—	—	—	—	—
1974–75	Long Island Cougars	NAHL	6	7	2	9	0	—	—	—	—	—
1974–75	Chicago Cougars	WHA	69	16	33	49	21	—	—	—	—	—
1975–76	Denver Spurs/Ottawa Civics	WHA	37	6	16	22	11	—	—	—	—	—
1975–76	Indianapolis Racers	WHA	2	0	0	0	0	—	—	—	—	—
1976–77	Indianapolis Racers	WHA	56	9	12	21	14	9	3	1	4	17
1977–78	Phoenix Roadrunners	CHL	10	1	2	3	10	—	—	—	—	—
1977–78	Stettler Sabres	ASHL	18	18	25	43	17	—	—	—	—	—
1978–79	Phoenix Roadrunners	PHL	2	0	0	0	0	—	—	—	—	—
1978–79	Tucson Rustlers	PHL	29	8	11	19	11	—	—	—	—	—
WHA totals			164	31	61	92	46	9	3	1	4	17
