= Norm LaPointe =

Canadian ice hockey player (born 1955)

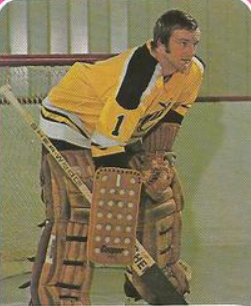
- LaPointe in 1975 card
- Born: August 13, 1955 (age 70) Laval, Quebec, Canada
- Height: 6 ft 1 in (185 cm)
- Weight: 180 lb (82 kg; 12 st 12 lb)
- Position: Goaltender
- Caught: Left
- Played for: Cincinnati Stingers
- NHL draft: 46th overall, 1975; Vancouver Canucks
- WHA draft: 46th overall, 1975; Cincinnati Stingers
- Playing career: 1975–1980

Normand "Norm" LaPointe (born August 13, 1955) is a Canadian former professional ice hockey goaltender.

== Early life ==
LaPointe was born in Laval, Quebec. As a youth, he played in the 1965 Quebec International Pee-Wee Hockey Tournament with a minor ice hockey team from Saint-Vincent-de-Paul, Quebec, and the 1967 tournament with a team from Pointe-Claire.

== Career ==
LaPointe was selected by the Vancouver Canucks in the third round (46th overall) of the 1975 NHL Amateur Draft, and was also drafted by the Cincinnati Stingers in the fourth round (46th overall) of the 1975 WHA Amateur Draft. LaPointe played three seasons in the World Hockey Association with the Cincinnati Stingers. In January 1979, the Fort Wayne Komets traded LaPointe to the Toledo Goaldiggers in exchange for defenceman Peter Brown.

== Career statistics ==
=== Regular season and playoffs ===
			Regular season									Playoffs
Season	Team	League	GP	W	L	T	MIN	GA	SO	GAA	SV%	GP	W	L	MIN	GA	SO	GAA	SV%
1971–72	Laval National	QMJHL	31	–	–	–	–	195	0	6.30	.868	–	–	–	–	–	–	–	–
1972–73	Laval National	QMJHL	29	–	–	–	1180	153	0	5.27	5	–	–	–	–	–	–	–	–
1973–74	Trois-Rivieres Ducs	QMJHL	38	–	–	–	–	251	0	6.72	4	–	–	–	–	–	–	–	–
1974–75	Trois-Rivieres Draveurs	QMJHL	72	–	–	–	4307	293	4	4.08	6	–	–	–	–	–	–	–	–
1975–76	Cincinnati Stingers	WHA	12	4	6	0	641	55	0	5.15	.854	–	–	–	–	–	–	–	–
1975–76	Hampton Gulls	SHL	33	15	9	7	1917	86	1	2.69	.915	7	–	–	–	–	–	–	–
1976–77	Cincinnati Stingers	WHA	52	21	25	2	2817	175	2	3.73	.878	4	0	3	273	16	0	3.52	—
1977–78	Hampton Gulls	AHL	6	1	4	0	282	23	0	4.89	.860	–	–	–	–	–	–	–	–
1977–78	Cincinnati Stingers	WHA	13	5	6	1	647	50	0	4.64	.855	–	–	–	–	–	–	–	–
1977–78	Broome Dusters	AHL	15	3	7	2	743	59	0	4.76	.879	–	–	–	–	–	–	–	–
1978–79	Dallas Black Hawks	CHL	10	2	5	1	491	41	0	5.01	.850	–	–	–	–	–	–	–	–
1978–79	Toledo Goaldiggers	IHL	–	–	–	–	1847	105	0	3.41	–	5	–	–	–	–	–	–	–
1978–79	Fort Wayne Komets	IHL	Statistics Unavailable
1979–80	Cincinnati Stingers	CHL	20	6	10	0	1019	69	0	4.06	.851	–	–	–	–	–	–	–	–
1979–80	Erie Blades	EHL	23	12	7	0	1153	76	0	3.95	.864	–	–	–	–	–	–	–	–
WHA totals			77	30	37	3	4105	280	2	4.09	.870	4	0	3	273	16	0	3.52	—

== Awards and honours ==
Award	Year
CCM QMJHL Player of Year	1974–75
