= Dan Labraaten =

Swedish ice hockey player

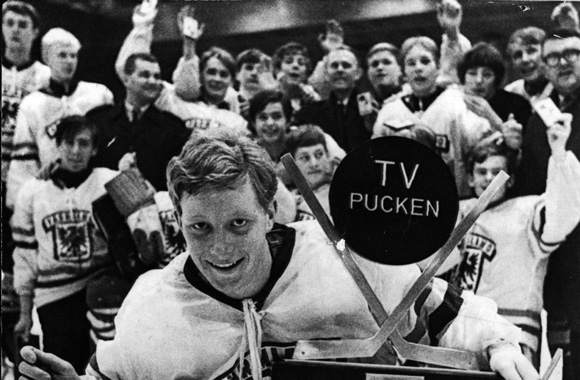
- Värmland won the ice hockey tournament TV-pucken in 1967. Dan Labraaten holds the trophy.
- Born: September 5, 1951 (age 75) Arvika, Sweden
- Height: 5 ft 9 in (175 cm)
- Weight: 171 lb (78 kg; 12 st 3 lb)
- Position: Left wing
- Shot: Right
- Played for: Leksands IF; Winnipeg Jets; Detroit Red Wings; Calgary Flames
- National team: Sweden
- NHL draft: Undrafted
- Playing career: 1969–1988

Dan Labraaten (born September 5, 1951) is a Swedish former professional ice hockey player and scout who played 268 games in the National Hockey League and 111 games in the World Hockey Association between 1976 and 1982. He played for the Calgary Flames, Detroit Red Wings, and Winnipeg Jets. He also played in the Swedish Division I and Elitserien from 1969 to 1976 and again from 1982 to 1988. Internationally, he played for Swedish national team at several international tournaments, including six World Championships, winning one silver and four bronze medals.

== Career statistics ==
=== Regular season and playoffs ===
| | | | Regular season | | | | | Playoffs |
| Season | Team | League | GP | G | A | Pts | PIM | GP | G | A | Pts | PIM |
|---|---|---|---|---|---|---|---|---|---|---|---|---|
| 1965–66 | Grums IK | SWE-2 | — | — | — | — | — | — | — | — | — | — |
| 1966–67 | Grums IK | SWE-2 | 22 | 7 | — | — | — | — | — | — | — | — |
| 1967–68 | Grums IK | SWE-2 | 19 | 14 | 9 | 23 | — | — | — | — | — | — |
| 1968–69 | Grums IK | SWE-2 | 21 | 18 | 9 | 27 | — | — | — | — | — | — |
| 1969–70 | Leksands IF | SWE | 28 | 14 | 9 | 23 | 4 | — | — | — | — | — |
| 1970–71 | Leksands IF | SWE | 23 | 13 | 14 | 27 | 11 | — | — | — | — | — |
| 1971–72 | Leksands IF | SWE | 28 | 12 | 8 | 20 | 12 | — | — | — | — | — |
| 1972–73 | Leksands IF | SWE | 28 | 17 | 10 | 27 | 25 | — | — | — | — | — |
| 1973–74 | Leksands IF | SWE | 33 | 17 | 16 | 33 | 6 | — | — | — | — | — |
| 1974–75 | Leksands IF | SWE | 30 | 24 | 14 | 38 | 40 | — | — | — | — | — |
| 1975–76 | Leksands IF | SWE | 16 | 13 | 9 | 22 | 6 | 4 | 2 | 0 | 2 | 0 |
| 1976–77 | Winnipeg Jets | WHA | 64 | 24 | 27 | 51 | 21 | 20 | 7 | 17 | 24 | 15 |
| 1977–78 | Winnipeg Jets | WHA | 47 | 18 | 16 | 34 | 30 | 4 | 1 | 1 | 2 | 8 |
| 1978–79 | Detroit Red Wings | NHL | 78 | 19 | 19 | 38 | 8 | — | — | — | — | — |
| 1979–80 | Detroit Red Wings | NHL | 76 | 30 | 27 | 57 | 8 | — | — | — | — | — |
| 1980–81 | Detroit Red Wings | NHL | 44 | 3 | 8 | 11 | 12 | — | — | — | — | — |
| 1980–81 | Calgary Flames | NHL | 27 | 9 | 7 | 16 | 13 | 5 | 1 | 0 | 1 | 4 |
| 1981–82 | Calgary Flames | NHL | 43 | 10 | 12 | 22 | 6 | 3 | 0 | 0 | 0 | 0 |
| 1982–83 | Leksands IF | SWE | 30 | 9 | 10 | 19 | 26 | — | — | — | — | — |
| 1983–84 | Leksands IF | SWE | 36 | 23 | 21 | 44 | 14 | — | — | — | — | — |
| 1984–85 | Leksands IF | SWE | 27 | 15 | 14 | 29 | 14 | — | — | — | — | — |
| 1985–86 | Leksands IF | SWE | 36 | 20 | 12 | 32 | 18 | — | — | — | — | — |
| 1986–87 | Leksands IF | SWE | 31 | 17 | 14 | 31 | 14 | — | — | — | — | — |
| 1987–88 | Leksands IF | SWE | 24 | 9 | 7 | 16 | 10 | 3 | 0 | 0 | 0 | 2 |
| SWE totals | | | 370 | 203 | 158 | 361 | 200 | 7 | 2 | 0 | 2 | 2 |
| WHA totals | | | 111 | 42 | 43 | 85 | 51 | 24 | 8 | 18 | 26 | 23 |
| NHL totals | | | 268 | 71 | 73 | 144 | 47 | 8 | 1 | 0 | 1 | 4 |

=== International ===
Medal record

Representing Sweden

World Championships
| Silver medal – second place | 1986 Soviet Union | |
| Bronze medal – third place | 1974 Finland | |
| Bronze medal – third place | 1975 West Germany | |
| Bronze medal – third place | 1976 Poland | |
| Bronze medal – third place | 1979 Soviet Union | |

IIHF European Junior Championships
| Silver medal – second place | 1969 West Germany | |
| Bronze medal – third place | 1968 Finland | |
| Bronze medal – third place | 1970 Switzerland | |

| Year | Team | Event | GP | G | A | Pts | PIM |
|---|---|---|---|---|---|---|---|
| 1968 | Sweden | EJC | 5 | 5 | 2 | 7 | 0 |
| 1969 | Sweden | EJC | 5 | 3 | 0 | 3 | 0 |
| 1970 | Sweden | EJC | 5 | 5 | 3 | 8 | 2 |
| 1974 | Sweden | WC | 9 | 2 | 0 | 2 | 8 |
| 1975 | Sweden | WC | 10 | 9 | 1 | 10 | 12 |
| 1976 | Sweden | WC | 10 | 5 | 3 | 8 | 8 |
| 1976 | Sweden | CC | 5 | 0 | 1 | 1 | 2 |
| 1979 | Sweden | WC | 8 | 1 | 1 | 2 | 4 |
| 1985 | Sweden | WC | 10 | 2 | 2 | 4 | 6 |
| 1986 | Sweden | WC | 8 | 0 | 3 | 3 | 2 |
| Junior totals | | | 15 | 13 | 5 | 18 | 2 |
| Senior totals | | | 60 | 19 | 11 | 30 | 42 |
