= Bill Hunter Trophy =

The Bill Hunter Trophy was presented to the World Hockey Association's scoring leader in the regular season.

It was named in honour of Bill Hunter, who founded the Alberta Oilers hockey club (which later became the Edmonton Oilers).

== Winners ==
- 1973 – Andre Lacroix, Philadelphia Blazers
- 1974 – Mike Walton, Minnesota Fighting Saints
- 1975 – Andre Lacroix, San Diego Mariners
- 1976 – Marc Tardif, Quebec Nordiques
- 1977 – Real Cloutier, Quebec Nordiques
- 1978 – Marc Tardif, Quebec Nordiques
- 1979 – Real Cloutier, Quebec Nordiques

== See also ==
- Bill Hunter Memorial Trophy - for the top defenceman of the Western Hockey League
