= Bruce Landon =

Canadian ice hockey player (born 1949)

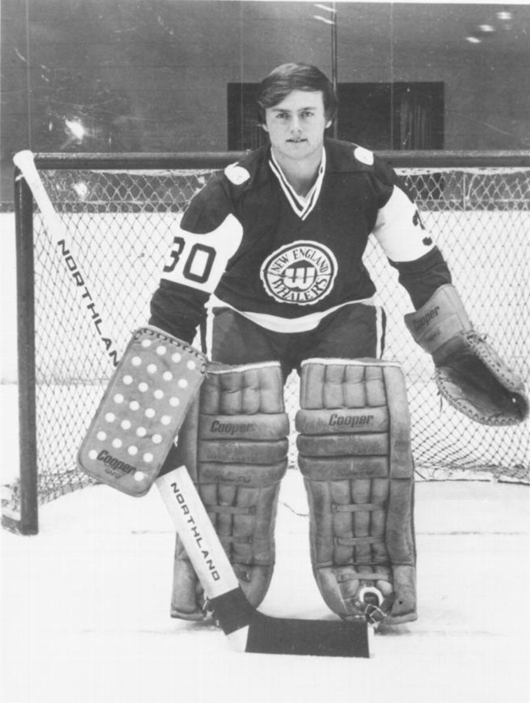
- Born: October 5, 1949 (age 76) Kingston, Ontario, Canada
- Height: 5 ft 8 in (173 cm)
- Weight: 180 lb (82 kg; 12 st 12 lb)
- Position: Goaltender
- Played for: New England Whalers
- NHL draft: 39th overall, 1969; Los Angeles Kings
- Playing career: 1969–1978

Bruce Norman Landon (born October 5, 1949) is a Canadian former professional ice hockey executive and goaltender who was the longtime part-owner, president and general manager of the Springfield Falcons of the American Hockey League.

== Playing career ==
Following a successful junior career with the Peterborough Petes of the Ontario Hockey League in which he finished second in the league in goals against average in his final season, Landon was selected in the fourth round of the 1969 amateur draft by the Los Angeles Kings of the National Hockey League. He played three seasons for their minor-league affiliate Springfield Kings, finishing ninth in the league in 1970 and leading the league to the Calder Cup finals, and backing up future Hockey Hall of Famer Billy Smith as the Kings won the AHL's Calder Cup championship in 1971.

In 1973, Landon signed with the upstart World Hockey Association's New England Whalers and was the team's backup goaltender for five seasons. His best season was 1976, where despite a losing record provoked by the Whalers' anemic offense, he had a goals against average of 3.47, good for 9th place in the high scoring WHA.

He had a second stint with Springfield at the start of the 1977–78 AHL season, but suffered a career-ending knee injury in practice and retired at age 28.

Landon finished his WHA career with 50 wins, 50 losses and 9 ties in 122 games, recording two shutouts and a 3.46 goals against average.

== Hockey executive ==
After his retirement, Landon was hired by the Springfield Indians as an executive and broadcaster, and won the AHL's Ken McKenzie Award as the individual who best promoted his team in 1980, the James C. Hendy Memorial Award in 1989 as the league's top executive, and the Thomas Ebright Award for outstanding contributions to the league in 2002. In 1982, Landon became the general manager of the Springfield AHL team, and remained in that position for the remainder of the Indians' existence, leading the franchise to its final two Calder Cup championships in 1990 and 1991.

When the Indians were sold to out-of-town interests in 1994 and moved to Worcester, Massachusetts, Landon put together an investment group to secure an expansion franchise from the AHL, the Springfield Falcons. The league, which is based in Springfield, was keen to maintain a presence in a city that has been hosted a team in the AHL and its predecessors for all but seven years since 1926. Landon was the president and general manager of the Falcons until 2014.

On November 3, 2007, the American Hockey League, in recognition of his years of service to hockey, held a "Bruce Landon Night" in Springfield, Massachusetts, at the MassMutual Center.

On February 4, 2014, Landon ended an era, stepping down as president, general manager and co-owner of the Springfield Falcons, and was named director of hockey operations by the team until the spring of 2016, when he retired shortly before the team was relocated to Tucson, Arizona. He was subsequently named a senior consultant by its successor franchise, the Springfield Thunderbirds, until retiring at the end of the 2016–17 AHL season. Landon was honored by the city of Springfield by the renaming of a downtown street "Bruce Landon Way", and was inducted by the AHL into the AHL Hall of Fame in 2016.

His autobiography, The Puck Stops Here: My (Not So) Minor League Life, was published in 2019.

== Career statistics ==
=== Regular season and playoffs ===
			Regular season									Playoffs
Season	Team	League	GP	W	L	T	MIN	GA	SO	GAA	SV%	GP	W	L	MIN	GA	SO	GAA	SV%
1968–69	Peterborough Petes	OHA	39	—	—	—	127	3	3.22	—	—	—	—	—	—	—	—	—	—
1969–70	Springfield Kings	AHL	45	—	—	—	2486	155	3	3.74	-	6	—	—	—	—	—	—	—
1970–71	Springfield Kings	AHL	15	—	—	—	735	53	1	4.32	—	—	—	—	—	—	—	—	—
1971–72	Springfield Kings	AHL	32	—	—	—	1918	118	2	3.69	—	—	—	—	—	—	—	—	—
1972–73	New England Whalers	WHA	30	15	11	1	1671	100	1	3.59	.887	—	—	—	—	—	—	—	—
1973–74	Jacksonville Barons	AHL	3	—	—	—	140	7	0	3.00	—	—	—	—	—	—	—	—	—
1973–74	New England Whalers	WHA	24	11	9	2	1386	82	0	3.55	.882	1	—	—	—	—	—	—	—
1974–75	New England Whalers	WHA	7	2	3	0	339	19	0	3.36	.900	—	—	—	—	—	—	—	—
1974–75	Cape Codders	NAHL	3	1	2	0	182	12	0	3.96	-	—	—	—	—	—	—	—	—
1975–76	New England Whalers	WHA	38	14	19	5	2181	126	0	3.47	.885	4	—	—	—	—	—	—	—
1976–77	Rhode Island Reds	AHL	10	3	5	0	467	33	0	4.24	.881	—	—	—	—	—	—	—	—
1976–77	New England Whalers	WHA	23	8	8	1	1118	59	1	3.17	.896	3	—	—	—	—	—	—	—
1977–78	Springfield Indians	AHL	14	5	4	2	719	58	0	4.84	.870	—	—	—	—	—	—	—	—
WHA totals			122	50	50	9	6695	386	2	3.46	.888	8	—	—	—	—	—	—	—
