= Gene Peacosh =

Canadian ice hockey player

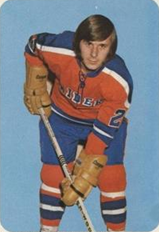
- 1973-74 card of Peacosh
- Born: September 28, 1948 (age 77) Sherridon, Manitoba, Canada
- Height: 5 ft 11 in (180 cm)
- Weight: 180 lb (82 kg; 12 st 12 lb)
- Position: Centre
- Shot: Left
- Played for: WHA; New York Raiders; New York Golden Blades; Jersey Knights; San Diego Mariners; Edmonton Oilers; Indianapolis Racers
- Playing career: 1964–1977

Eugene Michael "Gene" Peacosh (born September 28, 1948) is a retired professional ice hockey player who played 367 games in the World Hockey Association. He played with the New York Raiders, New York Golden Blades, Jersey Knights, San Diego Mariners, Edmonton Oilers and Indianapolis Racers.

== Hockey career ==
Incidentally, Gene's older brother Walt played professional hockey in the 1960s.

Peacosh was one of the best hockey players to come out of British Columbia during the late 1960s and early 70s. Despite being born in Manitoba, he grew up in the Okanagan Valley in British Columbia, and that is where his hockey career began. He won the Okanagan Junior Hockey League scoring championship with 94 points and set a league record with 51 goals while playing for the Penticton Broncos. He led the team to win both the regular season championship and Fred Page's post-season championship as well. As a junior, Peacosh quickly established himself as a prolific goal scorer. He was drafted into major junior hockey and continued to top team and league scoring statistics.

From 1968–69 to 1971–72, he played for the Johnstown Jets in the Eastern Hockey League. Peacosh scored over 100 points in each of his last three seasons, after totaling 87 in his first year. He scored at least 43 goals each of these seasons.

After turning down a contract from the Montreal Canadiens, he decided instead to play in the World Hockey Association. Peacosh's scoring touch remained constant as a pro, averaging approximately a goal every other game. He occupies a high position in the WHA record books as his 330 points in 5 seasons are the 33rd highest total recorded in the circuit.

Peacosh scored 37 goals as a rookie in the WHA. He scored only 21 goals the following season but then registered two impressive seasons with the San Diego Mariners scoring 43 and 37 goals respectively. He was still putting the puck into the net in 1976–77, despite being moved from San Diego to the Edmonton Oilers, and finally to the Indianapolis Racers. In Game 1 of the first round of the 1977 WHA playoffs on April 9, Peacosh scored the winning goal for the Racers against the Cincinnati Stingers to end the longest game in WHA history, doing so with 8:40 remaining in triple-overtime. He played in nine postseason games that year, scoring three total goals in what ended up being his last games as a WHA player.

Gene and his wife Cathy have lived in Cranbrook, BC since 2005.

== Career statistics ==
=== Regular season and playoffs ===
| | | | Regular season | | | | | Playoffs |
| Season | Team | League | GP | G | A | Pts | PIM | GP | G | A | Pts | PIM |
|---|---|---|---|---|---|---|---|---|---|---|---|---|
| 1965–66 | Edmonton Oil Kings | ASHL | Statistics Unavailable |
| 1966–67 | Edmonton Oil Kings | CMJHL | Statistics Unavailable |
| 1967–68 | Swift Current Broncos | WCJHL | 53 | 52 | 48 | 100 | 60 | — | — | — | — | — |
| 1968–69 | Johnstown Jets | EHL | 71 | 44 | 43 | 87 | 36 | 3 | 0 | 1 | 1 | 0 |
| 1969–70 | Johnstown Jets | EHL | 74 | 49 | 66 | 115 | 42 | 4 | 1 | 0 | 1 | 2 |
| 1970–71 | Johnstown Jets | EHL | 74 | 51 | 66 | 117 | 24 | 10 | 9 | 4 | 13 | 20 |
| 1971–72 | Johnstown Jets | EHL | 75 | 43 | 64 | 107 | 28 | 11 | 11 | 6 | 17 | 9 |
| 1972–73 | New York Raiders | WHA | 67 | 37 | 34 | 71 | 25 | — | — | — | — | — |
| 1973–74 | New York Golden Blades/Jersey Knights | WHA | 68 | 21 | 32 | 53 | 17 | — | — | — | — | — |
| 1974–75 | San Diego Mariners | WHA | 78 | 43 | 36 | 79 | 22 | 10 | 7 | 5 | 12 | 4 |
| 1975–76 | San Diego Mariners | WHA | 79 | 37 | 33 | 70 | 35 | 11 | 2 | 1 | 3 | 21 |
| 1976–77 | Edmonton Oilers | WHA | 11 | 5 | 4 | 9 | 14 | — | — | — | — | — |
| 1976–77 | Indianapolis Racers | WHA | 64 | 22 | 26 | 48 | 21 | 9 | 3 | 3 | 6 | 2 |
| WHA totals | | | 367 | 165 | 165 | 330 | 134 | 30 | 12 | 9 | 21 | 27 |
