= Paul Baxter =

Canadian ice hockey player (born 1955)

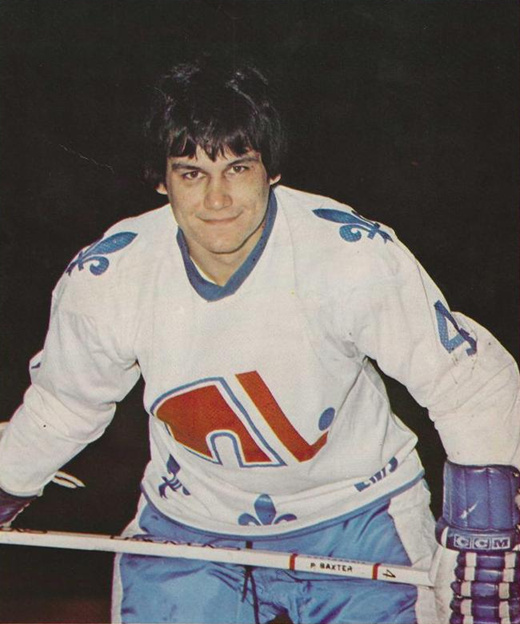
- Baxter in 1979 photo
- Born: October 28, 1955 (age 70) Winnipeg, Manitoba, Canada
- Height: 5 ft 11 in (180 cm)
- Weight: 200 lb (91 kg; 14 st 4 lb)
- Position: Defence
- Shot: Right
- Played for: Cleveland Crusaders; Quebec Nordiques; Pittsburgh Penguins; Calgary Flames
- NHL draft: 49th overall, 1975; Pittsburgh Penguins
- WHA draft: 11th overall, 1974; Cleveland Crusaders
- Playing career: 1974–1987

Paul Gordon Baxter (born October 28, 1955) is a Canadian former ice hockey defenceman who played in the World Hockey Association from 1974 to 1979 and the National Hockey League from 1979 to 1987. He played in two league championship finals with the 1976 Avco Cup Final with the Quebec Nordiques and the 1986 Stanley Cup Final with the Calgary Flames, winning with the former team. He is the all-time leader in penalty minutes in WHA history with 962. After retiring as a player, he worked as an assistant coach for eleven seasons.

== Playing career ==
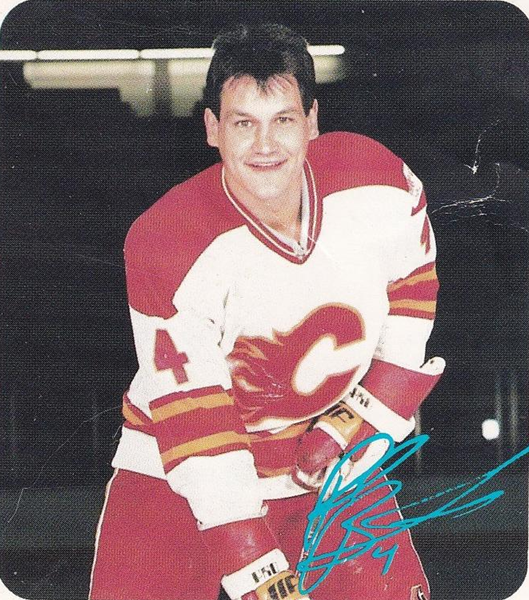
1986 card of Baxter for Calgary Flames

Before his major league career, Baxter played junior ice hockey for Winnipeg in the Western Canada Hockey League (WCHL). The Cleveland Crusaders of the World Hockey Association (WHA) drafted the Winnipeg-born Baxter in the first round as the 11th overall pick of the 1974 WHA Amateur Draft, and signed him that July. The following year he was drafted by the Pittsburgh Penguins of the National Hockey League (NHL) in the third round as the 49th overall pick of the 1975 NHL Amateur Draft. Baxter joined the Quebec Nordiques of the WHA in 1976, and when the Nordiques joined the NHL, Baxter was made a priority selection by Quebec, preventing Pittsburgh from reclaiming him. He played a year in the NHL with the Nordiques, and later spent three years with the Penguins and another four with the Calgary Flames. He retired from the NHL after 470 games, recording a total of 48 goals, 121 assists, 169 points, and 1564 penalty minutes. Baxter is the all-time leader in penalty minutes for the WHA with 962, and is also the single-season leader for the Pittsburgh Penguins with 409 during the 1981–82 season.

== Coaching career ==
Baxter continued his career as a coach, joining the Salt Lake Golden Eagles of the International Hockey League (IHL) to the Turner Cup title in 1987-88. He went on to become the assistant coach of multiple NHL clubs, including the Calgary Flames when they won the 1989 Stanley Cup.

Baxter coached the Wenatchee Wild of the North American Hockey League (NAHL) from 2008 until November 2010, leading the team to two division titles and a berth in the Robertson Cup in 2009. He then went to the Wichita Falls Wildcats of the NAHL as head coach, general manager, and part owner in May 2011. He left his operational positions with the Wildcats in October 2016 while remaining part owner. The team ceased operations at the end of the season.

=== Coaching history ===
- 1987–1989: Salt Lake Golden Eagles (IHL) head coach
- 1989–1992: Calgary Flames (NHL) assistant coach
- 1992–1995: Chicago Blackhawks (NHL) assistant coach
- 1995–1997: Saint John Flames (AHL) head coach
- 1997–2000: San Jose Sharks (NHL) assistant coach
- 2001–2003: Florida Panthers (NHL) assistant coach
- 2006-2008: HIFK SM-liiga (Finland) head coach
- 2008-2010: Wenatchee Wild (NAHL) head coach
- 2011–2014: Wichita Falls Wildcats (NAHL) head coach

== Personal life ==
Baxter and his wife currently live in Tennessee. Baxter has four children.

== Career statistics ==
=== Regular season and playoffs ===
Bold indicates led league

			Regular season					Playoffs
Season	Team	League	GP	G	A	Pts	PIM	GP	G	A	Pts	PIM
1972–73	Winnipeg Monarchs	MJHL	44	9	22	31	359	—	—	—	—	—
1973–74	Winnipeg Clubs	WCHL	63	10	30	40	384	—	—	—	—	—
1974–75	Cleveland Crusaders	WHA	5	0	0	0	37	—	—	—	—	—
1974–75	Cape Codders	NAHL	2	1	0	1	11	—	—	—	—	—
1975–76	Cleveland Crusaders	WHA	67	3	7	10	201	3	0	0	0	10
1975–76	Syracuse Blazers	NAHL	3	1	2	3	9	—	—	—	—	—
1976–77	Quebec Nordiques	WHA	66	6	17	23	244	12	2	2	4	35
1976–77	Maine Nordiques	NAHL	6	1	4	5	52	—	—	—	—	—
1977–78	Quebec Nordiques	WHA	76	6	29	35	240	11	4	7	11	42
1978–79	Quebec Nordiques	WHA	76	10	36	46	240	4	0	2	2	7
1979–80	Quebec Nordiques	NHL	61	7	13	20	145	—	—	—	—	—
1980–81	Pittsburgh Penguins	NHL	51	5	14	19	204	5	0	1	1	28
1981–82	Pittsburgh Penguins	NHL	76	9	34	43	**409**	5	0	0	0	14
1982–83	Pittsburgh Penguins	NHL	75	11	21	32	238	—	—	—	—	—
1983–84	Calgary Flames	NHL	74	7	20	27	182	11	0	2	2	37
1984–85	Calgary Flames	NHL	70	5	14	19	126	4	0	1	1	18
1985–86	Calgary Flames	NHL	47	4	3	7	194	13	0	1	1	55
1986–87	Calgary Flames	NHL	18	0	2	2	66	2	0	0	0	10
WHA totals			290	25	89	114	962	30	6	11	17	94
NHL totals			472	48	121	169	1564	40	0	5	5	162

== Awards and achievements ==
- Honoured Member of the Manitoba Hockey Hall of Fame

Preceded by Bobby Francis	HIFK head coach 2006–2008	Succeeded by Kari Jalonen
