= Serge Aubry =

Canadian ice hockey player

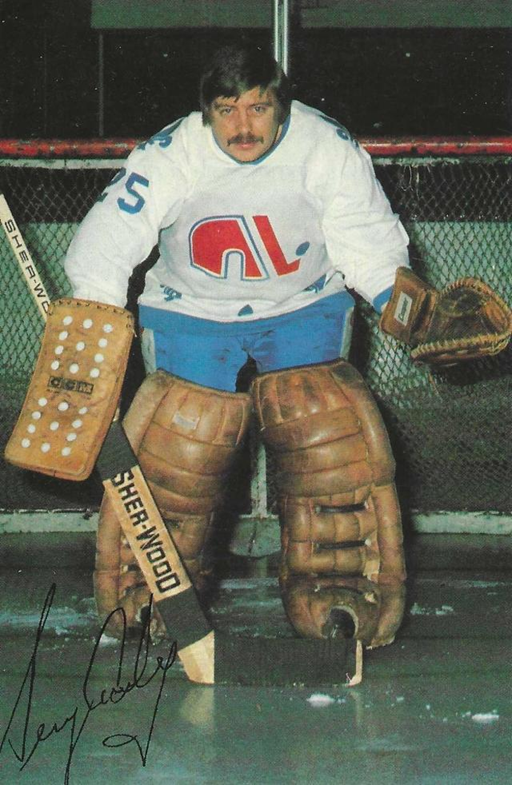
- Aubry in 1976 postcard
- Born: January 2, 1942 Montreal, Quebec, Canada
- Died: October 30, 2011 (aged 69) Lévis, Quebec, Canada
- Height: 5 ft 7 in (170 cm)
- Weight: 165 lb (75 kg; 11 st 11 lb)
- Position: Goaltender
- Caught: Left
- Played for: Quebec Nordiques; Cincinnati Stingers
- NHL draft: Undrafted
- Playing career: 1972–1977

Serge Dieudonne Aubry (January 2, 1942 – October 30, 2011) was a Canadian professional ice hockey goaltender who played 142 games in the World Hockey Association and an NHL coach.

== Early life ==
Aubry was born in Montreal, Quebec. He played junior hockey with the Sherbrooke Castors and Windsor Maple Leafs.

== Career ==
Aubry played with the Quebec Nordiques and Cincinnati Stingers. During a five-season career, Aubry posted a record of 65-53-5, with five shutouts. His best season came during his rookie year in 1972–73, when he compiled a 25–22–3 record, with two shutouts. His goals-against average that season was the best of his career at 3.59. Aubry later served as the NHL Nordiques' goalie coach during the 1988–89 season and as a scout for the Los Angeles Kings.

== Personal life ==
On October 30, 2011, Aubry died in a Lévis, Quebec, hospital from diabetes.

== Career statistics ==
			Regular season									Playoffs
Season	Team	League	GP	W	L	T	MIN	GA	SO	GAA	SV%	GP	W	L	T	MIN	GA	SO	GAA	SV%
1963–64	Windsor Maple Leafs	NSSHL	—	—	—	—	—	—	—	—	—	—	—	—	—	—	—	—	—	—
1965–66	Sherbrooke Castors	QPHL	—	—	—	—	—	—	—	—	—	—	—	—	—	—	—	—	—	—
1966–67	Sherbrooke Castors	QPHL	—	—	—	—	—	—	—	—	—	—	—	—	—	—	—	—	—	—
1967–68	Tulsa Oilers	CHL	34	16	9	6	1922	115	0	3.59	?	—	—	—	—	—	—	—	—	—
1968–69	Des Moines Oak Leafs	IHL	6	—	—	—	—	—	—	—	—	—	—	—	—	—	—	—	—	—
1968–69	Tulsa Oilers	CHL	31	12	9	8	1741	104	0	3.58	?	—	—	—	—	—	—	—	—	—
1969–70	Tulsa Oilers	CHL	38	15	13	5	2180	92	2	2.53	?	—	—	—	—	—	—	—	—	—
1970–71	Rochester Americans	AHL	51	—	—	—	2787	149	2	3.20	—	—	—	—	—	—	—	—	—	—
1971–72	Rochester Americans	AHL	51	—	—	—	1813	137	0	4.53	—	—	—	—	—	—	—	—	—	—
1972–73	Quebec Nordiques	WHA	52	25	22	3	3036	182	1	3.59	.898	—	—	—	—	—	—	—	—	—
1973–74	Quebec Nordiques	WHA	26	11	11	2	1395	90	1	3.87	.880	—	—	—	—	—	—	—	—	—
1974–75	Quebec Nordiques	WHA	31	17	11	0	1762	109	0	3.71	.886	—	—	—	—	—	—	—	—	—
1975–76	Cincinnati Stingers	WHA	12	6	4	0	549	38	1	4.15	.858	—	—	—	—	—	—	—	—	—
1976–77	Quebec Nordiques	WHA	21	6	5	0	769	51	1	3.98	.862	3	—	—	—	?	1	0	—	.900
WHA totals			142	65	53	5	7511	470	4	3.75	.876	3	—	—	—		1	0		.900
