= Réal Cloutier =

Canadian ice hockey player (born 1956)

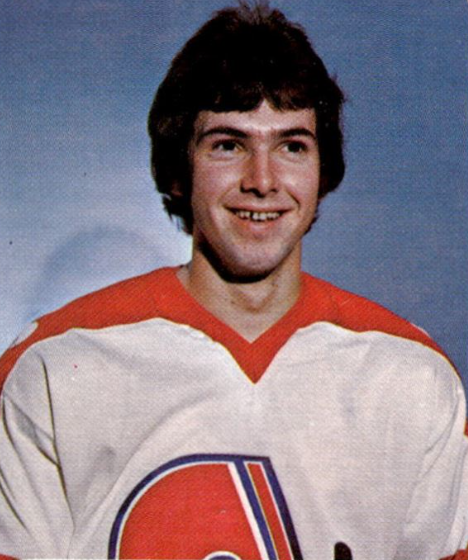
- Cloutier in 1976
- Born: June 30, 1956 (age 69) Saint-Émile, Quebec, Canada
- Height: 5 ft 10 in (178 cm)
- Weight: 185 lb (84 kg; 13 st 3 lb)
- Position: Right wing
- Shot: Left
- Played for: Quebec Nordiques; Buffalo Sabres
- NHL draft: 9th overall, 1976; Chicago Black Hawks
- WHA draft: 9th overall, 1974; Quebec Nordiques
- Playing career: 1974–1985

Réal Cloutier (klew-tee-AY; born July 30, 1956) is a Canadian former professional ice hockey player. Cloutier spent five prolific seasons as a winger in the World Hockey Association (WHA) with the Quebec Nordiques. In his rookie season as a professional, he scored 26 goals in 63 games. He proceeded to reach his prime over the next couple of seasons, which started with scoring 60 goals in his sophomore season in 1975. The next season saw him score 66 goals with 75 assists to record a career-high 141 total points as the Nordiques advanced all the way to the Avco Cup Finals. In 17 postseason games that year, he scored 14 goals and had 27 total points as Quebec won their only championship. Cloutier recorded two further 100-point seasons (which included a career-high 75 goals in 1978-79) prior to the team being absorbed into the National Hockey League (NHL) in 1979; in 369 total games in the WHA, he had 566 total points. He scored 42 goals in 67 games in the first season in the NHL in 1979-80 before injuries hindered him in his next two seasons with the team that saw him score 80 combined goals in his last three seasons with Quebec. He was traded to the Buffalo Sabres in 1983, but troubles with ice time saw him score 24 total goals in 81 games over two years.

== Playing career ==
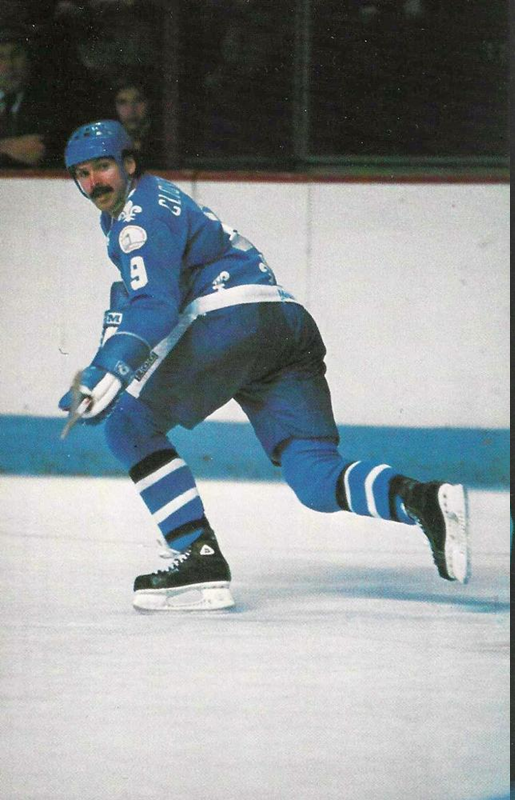
1980s postcard of Cloutier in action for Quebec Nordiques

As a youth, Cloutier played in four consecutive Quebec International Pee-Wee Hockey Tournaments from 1966 to 1969, with a minor ice hockey team from Orsainville, Quebec City.

Nicknamed "Buddy" and touted as one of the most promising prospects in the history of the Quebec Major Junior Hockey League, Cloutier played junior hockey for the Quebec Remparts, leading his team to back-to-back Memorial Cup finals in 1973 and 1974. His final season with the Remparts saw him score 216 points to lead the team in scoring.

In 1974, the National Hockey League (NHL) made a brief exception to allow teenagers to play, but Cloutier signed with the Quebec Nordiques of the World Hockey Association (WHA) and made an immediate impact in his 1974–75 rookie season. He scored 26 goals and helped the Nordiques to the AVCO Cup finals.

The next season saw Cloutier break into stardom, as he scored 60 goals to begin a streak of four seasons of at least 56 goals. In 1976–77 season, he scored 66 goals and 141 points to lead the WHA in scoring, adding 14 goals and 13 assists in 17 playoff games to lead the Nordiques to their only AVCO Cup championship. His best goal scoring season came in the WHA's final season of 1978–79, when he scored 75 goals, at the time the third highest total in the combined WHA and NHL professional history, behind Bobby Hull (77 goals, 1974–75 WHA season) and Phil Esposito (76 goals, 1970–71 NHL season).

Prior to the WHA's merger with the NHL in 1979, Cloutier's NHL rights belonged to the Chicago Black Hawks, which had selected him in the 1976 NHL Amateur Draft. The incoming WHA teams had a maximum of four "priority selections", up to two skaters and two goaltenders, that they could protect from being reclaimed by the NHL team that held their rights. In order to save their priority selections for defencemen Paul Baxter and Garry Lariviere, Quebec traded its first-round draft choice (which would turn into future superstar Denis Savard) to Chicago in order to retain Cloutier. He proved to be a consistent scorer in the NHL, scoring 42 goals in 1979–80, and, although he was slowed by injuries, 37 and 28 goals his last two full seasons with the Nordiques. His second season in the NHL was hampered by an neck injury he suffered in a summer softball game. An ankle injury slowed him in the next season to go along with gripes with teammates and publicity. Cloutier did not appreciate the end of his Nordique tenure, reflecting in 2019, "I have nothing against the Stastnys, we would have scored tons of points playing with them. But [Michel] Bergeron had other plans. Before he arrived, he had said that the Cloutiers, (Marc) Tardif and (Serge) Bernier, it was going to rise. He gradually squeezed us down by making us look like troublemakers. I quickly understood that when you're the valet, you're not the king." He expressed disappointment to have not played for long on the same line as Tardif and Stastny, stating that it cost the team a Stanley Cup.

Cloutier's time in Quebec came to an end as he, along with the Nordiques' first-round draft pick, was traded on June 8, 1983 to the Buffalo Sabres in exchange for Tony McKegney, André Savard, and Jean-François Sauvé. In Buffalo he reportedly clashed with Sabres' coach Scotty Bowman, who had a long history of benching offensive players who he felt were not paying sufficient attention to defensive play, and although he scored a credible 24 goals and 60 points in his only full season for the Sabres, he was sent to the minor leagues the next year, retiring thereafter at the age of 28.

In retirement, Cloutier has worked in the photocopying industry for several years along with touring with Legends of Hockey.

== Legacy ==
When the WHA folded, Cloutier stood as the fourth leading scorer in WHA history, with 283 goals, 283 assists and 566 points in 369 games, adding 33 goals and 30 assists in 48 playoff games. In 317 NHL games, he scored 344 points. In 2010, he was inducted into the World Hockey Association Hall of Fame.

A sculpture of Cloutier was constructed at Place Jean-Beliveau in the Youth Pavilion on the ExpoCite in Quebec City in 2021.

== Awards ==
- Named to the WHA Second All-Star Team in 1976, 1977 and 1978.
- Named to the WHA First All-Star Team in 1979.
- Won the Bill Hunter Trophy as the WHA's scoring leader in 1977 and 1979.
- Played in the NHL All-Star Game in 1980.

== Records ==
- Third all-time in the WHA for goals scored, eleventh in assists and fourth in points.
- Second player to score a hat trick in his NHL debut, 36 years after Alex Smart first achieved the feat in 1943.
- He is the youngest pro hockey player in history to score 60 goals in a season. (19 years, 251 days)
- He was the youngest pro hockey player in history to score 100 goals (20 years, 89 days) until he was passed by Mark Napier
- He was the youngest pro hockey player in history to score 200 goals (21 years, 229 days) until he was passed by Wayne Gretzky
- He was the youngest pro hockey player in history to score 300 goals (23 years, 124 days) until he was passed by Wayne Gretzky
- He was the youngest pro hockey player in history to score 400 goals (26 years, 209 days) until he was passed by Wayne Gretzky

== Career statistics ==
			Regular season					Playoffs
Season	Team	League	GP	G	A	Pts	PIM	GP	G	A	Pts	PIM
1972–73	Quebec Remparts	QMJHL	57	39	60	99	15	15	8	13	21	14
1972–73	Quebec Remparts	M-Cup	—	—	—	—	—	3	0	1	1	2
1973–74	Quebec Remparts	QMJHL	69	93	123	216	40	16	26	24	50	28
1973–74	Quebec Remparts	M-Cup	—	—	—	—	—	4	4	4	8	4
1974–75	Quebec Nordiques	WHA	63	26	27	53	36	12	4	3	7	2
1975–76	Quebec Nordiques	WHA	76	60	54	114	27	5	4	5	9	0
1976–77	Quebec Nordiques	WHA	76	66	75	141	39	17	14	13	27	10
1977–78	Quebec Nordiques	WHA	73	56	73	129	19	10	9	7	16	15
1978–79	Quebec Nordiques	WHA	77	75	54	129	48	4	2	2	4	2
1979–80	Quebec Nordiques	NHL	67	42	47	89	12	—	—	—	—	—
1980–81	Quebec Nordiques	NHL	34	15	16	31	18	3	0	0	0	10
1981–82	Quebec Nordiques	NHL	67	37	60	97	34	16	7	5	12	10
1982–83	Quebec Nordiques	NHL	68	28	39	67	30	4	0	0	0	0
1983–84	Buffalo Sabres	NHL	77	24	36	60	25	2	0	0	0	0
1984–85	Flint Generals	IHL	40	11	25	36	6	—	—	—	—	—
1984–85	Rochester Americans	AHL	12	4	3	7	0	—	—	—	—	—
1984–85	Buffalo Sabres	NHL	4	0	0	0	0	—	—	—	—	—
WHA totals			369	283	283	566	169	48	33	30	63	29
NHL totals			317	146	198	344	119	25	7	5	12	20

Preceded by Andre Savard	Quebec Nordiques first-round draft pick 1974	Succeeded by Pierre Mondou
Preceded by Greg Vaydik	Chicago Blackhawks first-round draft pick 1976	Succeeded by Doug Wilson
