= Joe Daley (ice hockey) =

Canadian ice hockey player (born 1943)

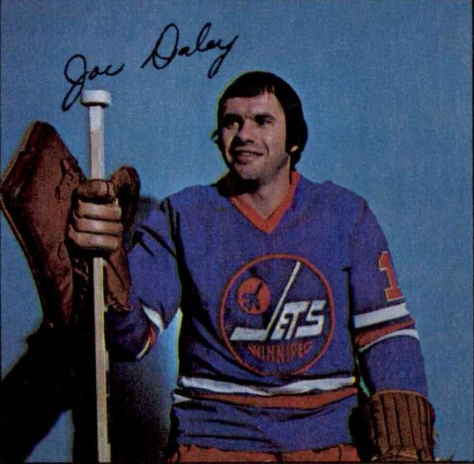
- Born: February 20, 1943 (age 83) East Kildonan, Manitoba, Canada
- Height: 5 ft 10 in (178 cm)
- Weight: 160 lb (73 kg; 11 st 6 lb)
- Position: Goaltender
- Caught: Left
- Played for: Pittsburgh Penguins; Buffalo Sabres; Detroit Red Wings; Winnipeg Jets (WHA)
- Playing career: 1961–1979

Thomas Joseph Daley (born February 20, 1943) is a Canadian former ice hockey goaltender. He played in the National Hockey League and World Hockey Association for the Pittsburgh Penguins, Buffalo Sabres, Detroit Red Wings, and Winnipeg Jets between 1968 and 1979. He is the all-time leader for wins in WHA history, having won 167 games.

== Career ==
Joe Daley started his NHL career with the Pittsburgh Penguins in 1968, where he played in 38 games over two seasons. After the 1969–70 season, the newly established Buffalo Sabres used their first choice in the 1970 Intra-League Draft to select Daley. He won 12 of his 38 starts there before moving on to the Detroit Red Wings in the Fall of 1971. Daley went 11-10-5 with Detroit, but his relationship soured with the team as time went on, with one instance seeing him sitting on the bench instead of starting a game, in which his wife and children were in attendance.

In the 1972 offseason, Daley was approached by Billy Robinson, the director of player personnel for the Winnipeg Jets of the upstart World Hockey Association, and soon afterwards they were able to come to terms for Daley to play for the newly formed WHA team. Daley's longest stint in major league hockey would be with Winnipeg, where he played from 1972 to 1979, and where he won the Avco World Trophy three times (1976, 1978, and 1979). Daley was also the WHA's second leading goalie during the 1975–76 season.

Joe Daley lost his primary spot as goaltender in the midst of the 1978–79 season, which saw him go 7-11-3 with a GAA of 4.29. In the summer of 1979, Daley was stated to be one of the players the Jets would give a tryout form for the NHL as he was a free agent. In September 1979, Daley, with no offer of a suitable contract by Winnipeg, stated that he would not report to training camp. Daley, alongside Bobby Hull, were the longest-served Jets. Daley never played hockey again. No goaltender played more games in the WHA than Daley, who started 308 games. He also held records for wins (167) and playoff wins (30). As a professional goaltender, Daley went 201–157–32. He was also one of the last NHL goalies to play without a mask, although he did wear a mask for Winnipeg in the WHA, doing so for his final five seasons.

In 1980, he was hired to work the sales team at Century 21 Pride Realty. For a time, Daley instructed a summer hockey school in Penticton, British Columbia. In 1981–82, he was the coach of the junior hockey Penticton Knights. In 1986, Daley became a salesman with Keystone Ford Sales. In 1989, Daley, at the urging of his son Travis, bought a dealership that became Joe Daley Sports Cards in Winnipeg, a trading card store located near his old playing grounds at the Winnipeg Arena; he still operates the store, now called Joe Daley's Sports and Framing that is located on St. Mary's Road.

Daley was named to the Manitoba Hockey Hall of Fame in 1995 and was named to the Manitoba Sports Hall of Fame in 2018. A mural honoring Daley was unveiled in 2019 at Bronx Park Community Centre, where he had played as a child.

== Career statistics ==
=== Regular season and playoffs ===
			Regular season									Playoffs
Season	Team	League	GP	W	L	T	MIN	GA	SO	GAA	SV%	GP	W	L	MIN	GA	SO	GAA	SV%
1961–62	Weyburn Red Wings	SJHL	53	17	29	7	3180	177	2	3.34	—	—	—	—	—	—	—	—	—
1961–62	Sudbury Wolves	EPHL	1	0	1	0	60	6	0	6.00	—	—	—	—	—	—	—	—	—
1962–63	Weyburn Red Wings	SJHL	51	28	17	6	3060	152	3	2.98	—	8	—	—	480	23	1	3.19	—
1963–64	Johnstown Jets	EHL	66	40	22	4	3960	221	4	3.35	—	10	5	5	600	27	1	2.70	—
1963–64	Cincinnati Wings	CPHL	1	0	1	0	60	3	0	3.00	—	—	—	—	—	—	—	—	—
1963–64	Pittsburgh Hornets	AHL	2	1	1	0	120	7	0	3.50	—	2	0	1	60	6	0	6.00	—
1964–65	Johnstown Jets	EHL	72	41	31	0	4320	292	2	4.06	—	5	2	3	300	19	1	3.80	—
1965–66	Memphis Wings	CPHL	68	25	31	12	4040	212	2	3.15	—	—	—	—	—	—	—	—	—
1965–66	San Francisco Seals	WHL	8	5	2	1	426	17	2	2.39	—	—	—	—	—	—	—	—	—
1966–67	Pittsburgh Hornets	AHL	16	11	1	3	948	43	0	2.72	—	—	—	—	—	—	—	—	—
1966–67	Memphis Wings	CPHL	50	23	21	5	2960	169	0	3.42	—	7	3	4	433	27	0	3.74	—
1967–68	Baltimore Clippers	AHL	56	23	25	8	3300	192	2	3.49	—	—	—	—	—	—	—	—	—
1968–69	Pittsburgh Penguins	NHL	29	10	13	3	1612	86	2	3.20	.910	—	—	—	—	—	—	—	—
1969–70	Pittsburgh Penguins	NHL	9	1	5	3	527	26	0	2.96	.899	—	—	—	—	—	—	—	—
1969–70	Baltimore Clippers	AHL	34	—	—	—	1867	107	0	3.44	—	5	1	4	315	25	0	4.76	—
1970–71	Buffalo Sabres	NHL	38	12	16	8	2069	129	1	3.74	.895	—	—	—	—	—	—	—	—
1971–72	Detroit Red Wings	NHL	29	11	10	5	1618	85	0	3.15	.893	—	—	—	—	—	—	—	—
1972–73	Winnipeg Jets	WHA	29	17	10	1	1718	83	2	2.90	.893	7	5	2	422	25	0	3.55	.874
1973–74	Winnipeg Jets	WHA	41	19	20	1	2454	163	0	3.99	.884	2	0	2	119	8	0	4.03	.860
1974–75	Winnipeg Jets	WHA	51	23	21	4	2902	175	1	3.62	.887		—	—	—	—	—	—	—
1975–76	Winnipeg Jets	WHA	62	41	17	1	3612	171	5	2.84	.903	12	10	1	671	29	1	2.59	.886
1976–77	Winnipeg Jets	WHA	65	39	23	2	3818	206	3	3.24	.892	20	11	9	1186	71	1	3.59	.875
1977–78	Winnipeg Jets	WHA	37	21	11	1	2075	114	1	3.30	.883	5	4	1	271	13	0	2.88	—
1978–79	Winnipeg Jets	WHA	23	7	11	3	1256	90	0	4.30	.871	3	0	0	37	3	0	4.86	—
WHA totals			308	167	113	13	17,835	1002	12	3.37	.889	49	30	15	2706	149	3.30	2	—
NHL totals			105	34	44	19	5826	326	3	3.36	.899	—	—	—	—	—	—	—	—

== Awards and achievements ==
- SJHL Second All-Star Team (1962)
- EHL Rookie of the Year (1964)
- Avco Cup (WHA) Championship (1976, 1978, & 1979)
- WHA First All-Star Team (1976)
- Izvestia Cup Best Goaltender (1976)
- WHA Second All-Star Team (1977)
- "Honoured Member" of the Manitoba Hockey Hall of Fame
- Inducted as an inaugural member into the World Hockey Association Hall of Fame (2010)
- Inducted into the Manitoba Sports Hall of Fame 2018
- All Time Leader in WHA wins by a goaltender
