= Morris Lukowich =

Canadian ice hockey player

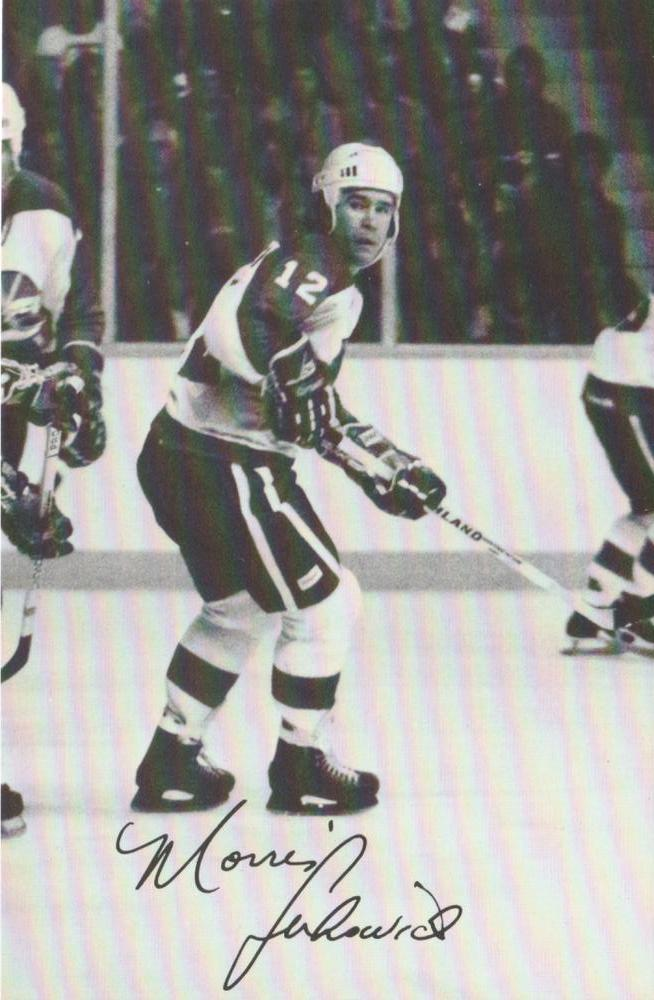
- Lukowich for Winnipeg, c. 1980
- Born: June 1, 1956 (age 69) Speers, Saskatchewan, Canada
- Height: 5 ft 9 in (175 cm)
- Weight: 170 lb (77 kg; 12 st 2 lb)
- Position: Left Wing
- Shot: Left
- Played for: Houston Aeros; Winnipeg Jets; Boston Bruins; Los Angeles Kings
- National team: Canada
- NHL draft: 47th overall, 1976; Pittsburgh Penguins
- WHA draft: 22nd overall, 1976; Houston Aeros
- Playing career: 1976–1987

Morris Eugene Lukowich (LEWK-oh-wich; born June 1, 1956) is a Canadian former professional ice hockey player. He was a member of the Winnipeg Jets of the World Hockey Association (WHA) and the National Hockey League (NHL) from 1976 to 1985, and later played for the Boston Bruins and Los Angeles Kings of the NHL. A left winger, Lukowich played in a total of 582 games over eight NHL seasons, registering a total of 199 goals and 219 assists for 418 points.

== Biography ==
Born in Speers, Saskatchewan, Lukowich was an explosive player, both in terms of speed and scoring, though he was considered small for a professional player.

Lukowich played junior hockey with the Medicine Hat Tigers for three years. In his final season, he had a career year, scoring 65 times and accumulating 142 points in 72 games. He was selected 47th overall in the 1976 NHL Amateur Draft by the Pittsburgh Penguins, as well as the Houston Aeros in the 1976 World Hockey Association Amateur Draft, and he opted to turn pro in the WHA rather than the NHL. The opportunity to play with his idol, Gordie Howe, in Houston was the deciding factor in this decision.

After two seasons in Houston, Lukowich moved on to Winnipeg for the 1978–79 season, the last for the financially troubled WHA. Lukowich scored 65 goals and added 34 assists for 99 points, and was named as the WHA's Second Team All Star. Lukowich scored 8 goals and a team high 15 points en route to capturing the final WHA championship, the Avco Cup.

When the WHA folded in 1979, the Jets were among four of its teams absorbed by the NHL. Under the NHL's admittance terms, these teams could only protect a fraction of their roster, and Lukowich was one of the few players Winnipeg managed to retain. The early NHL years were difficult for the Jets, but Lukowich quickly emerged as the team's star, and he was appointed Winnipeg's captain for the 1980–81 season. He scored 35 and 33 goals in his first two seasons respectively, before notching his best NHL numbers in 1981–82, scoring 43 goals and 92 points. He was invited to the NHL All Star game for the second year in a row, playing on a line with Mike Bossy and Bryan Trottier.

Lukowich took a step back in 1982–83, struggling through injuries. He played in 69 games with 22 goals and 43 points. He rebounded somewhat in 1983–84, reaching the 30 goal plateau once again along with 25 assists. Early in 1984–85, Lukowich was traded to Boston in exchange for Jim Nill.

Lukowich played in 36 games over parts of two seasons with the Bruins. He was placed on waivers early in the 1985–86 season and was picked up by the Los Angeles Kings, where he finished his NHL career. He played one additional season in Italy in 1987–88 before retiring from professional hockey.

Lukowich represented Canada at the 1993 Spengler Cup Tournament, and briefly re-emerged as an inline hockey player in 1994, playing several games with RHI's Calgary Rad'z.

== Personal ==
Morris Lukowich is the brother of curler Ed Lukowich and a cousin of hockey player Brad Lukowich. He currently resides with his wife and family in Calgary, Alberta, where he operates a hockey camp.

== Career statistics ==
=== Regular season and playoffs ===
			Regular season					Playoffs
Season	Team	League	GP	G	A	Pts	PIM	GP	G	A	Pts	PIM
1973–74	Medicine Hat Tigers	WCJHL	65	13	14	27	55	6	1	1	2	21
1974–75	Medicine Hat Tigers	WCJHL	70	40	54	94	111	5	4	1	5	2
1975–76	Medicine Hat Tigers	WCJHL	72	65	77	142	195	9	5	8	13	20
1976–77	Houston Aeros	WHA	62	27	18	45	67	11	6	4	10	19
1977–78	Houston Aeros	WHA	80	40	35	75	131	6	1	2	3	17
1978–79	Winnipeg Jets	WHA	80	65	34	99	119	10	8	7	15	21
1979–80	Winnipeg Jets	NHL	78	35	39	74	77	—	—	—	—	—
1980–81	Winnipeg Jets	NHL	80	33	34	67	90	—	—	—	—	—
1981–82	Winnipeg Jets	NHL	77	43	49	92	102	4	0	2	2	16
1982–83	Winnipeg Jets	NHL	69	22	21	43	67	—	—	—	—	—
1983–84	Winnipeg Jets	NHL	80	30	25	55	71	3	0	0	0	0
1984–85	Winnipeg Jets	NHL	47	5	9	14	31	—	—	—	—	—
1984–85	Boston Bruins	NHL	22	5	8	13	21	1	0	0	0	0
1985–86	Boston Bruins	NHL	14	1	4	5	10	—	—	—	—	—
1985–86	Los Angeles Kings	NHL	55	11	9	20	51	—	—	—	—	—
1986–87	Los Angeles Kings	NHL	60	14	21	35	64	3	0	0	0	8
1987–88	HC Merano	ITA	23	16	31	47	46	—	—	—	—	—
1989–90	SC Rapperswil–Jona	SUI–2	36	30	35	65	—	—	—	—	—	—
WHA totals			228	132	87	219	317	27	15	13	28	57
NHL totals			582	199	219	418	584	11	0	2	2	24

=== International ===
Year	Team	Event	GP	G	A	Pts	PIM
1981	Canada	WC	8	2	1	3	4
Senior totals			8	2	1	3	4

== Awards ==
- WCHL First All-Star Team – 1976

Preceded by Lars-Erik Sjoberg	Winnipeg Jets captain 1980–81	Succeeded by Dave Christian
