= John French (ice hockey) =

Canadian ice hockey player (born 1950)

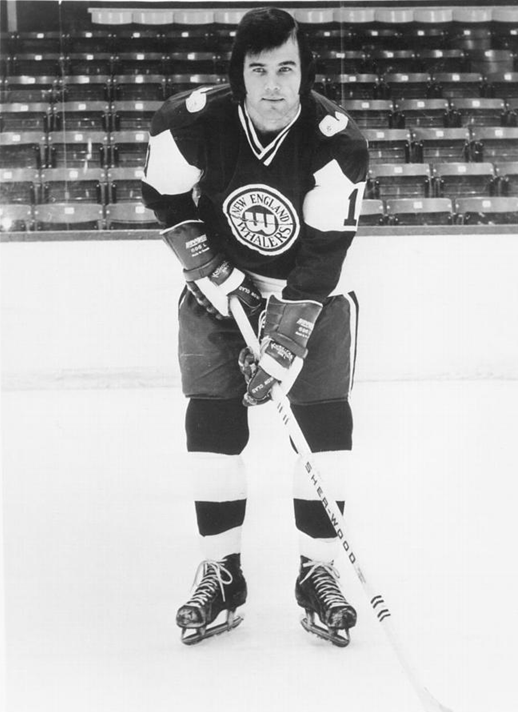
- Born: August 25, 1950 (age 75) Orillia, Ontario, Canada
- Height: 5 ft 11 in (180 cm)
- Weight: 165 lb (75 kg; 11 st 11 lb)
- Position: Centre
- Shot: Left
- Played for: New England Whalers; San Diego Mariners; Indianapolis Racers
- NHL draft: 52nd overall, 1970; Montreal Canadiens
- Playing career: 1970–1979

John George French (born August 25, 1950) is a Canadian former professional ice hockey centre who played 420 games in the World Hockey Association.

Born in Orillia, Ontario, he played with the New England Whalers, San Diego Mariners, and Indianapolis Racers.

== Career statistics ==
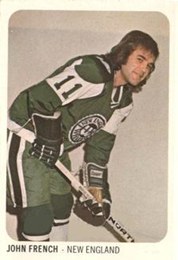
1973-74 card of French of the New England Whalers

| | | | Regular season | | | | | Playoffs |
| Season | Team | League | GP | G | A | Pts | PIM | GP | G | A | Pts | PIM |
|---|---|---|---|---|---|---|---|---|---|---|---|---|
| 1968–69 | Toronto Marlboros | OHA-Jr. | 54 | 17 | 25 | 42 | 62 | 6 | 3 | 3 | 6 | 12 |
| 1969–70 | Toronto Marlboros | OHA-Jr. | 52 | 23 | 25 | 48 | 92 | 8 | 1 | 2 | 3 | 2 |
| 1970–71 | Montreal Voyageurs | AHL | 65 | 15 | 22 | 37 | 14 | 1 | 0 | 0 | 0 | 0 |
| 1971–72 | Baltimore Clippers | AHL | 69 | 17 | 29 | 46 | 14 | 15 | 9 | 10 | 19 | 7 |
| 1972–73 | New England Whalers | WHA | 74 | 24 | 35 | 59 | 43 | 15 | 3 | 11 | 14 | 2 |
| 1973–74 | New England Whalers | WHA | 77 | 24 | 48 | 72 | 31 | 7 | 4 | 2 | 6 | 2 |
| 1974–75 | New England Whalers | WHA | 75 | 12 | 41 | 53 | 28 | 4 | 1 | 2 | 3 | 0 |
| 1975–76 | San Diego Mariners | WHA | 76 | 25 | 39 | 64 | 16 | 11 | 4 | 7 | 11 | 0 |
| 1976–77 | San Diego Mariners | WHA | 44 | 14 | 21 | 35 | 6 | 7 | 2 | 3 | 5 | 2 |
| 1977–78 | Indianapolis Racers | WHA | 74 | 9 | 8 | 17 | 6 | — | — | — | — | — |
| 1978–79 | Springfield Indians | AHL | 18 | 4 | 6 | 10 | 0 | — | — | — | — | — |
| WHA totals | | | 420 | 108 | 192 | 300 | 130 | 44 | 14 | 25 | 39 | 6 |
