= Peter Sullivan (ice hockey) =

Canadian ice hockey player

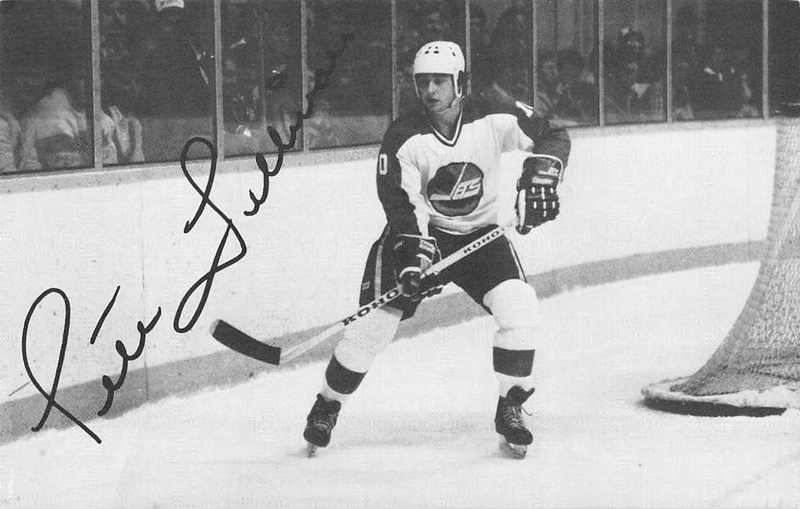
- Sullivan for Winnipeg, c. 1980
- Born: July 25, 1951 (age 74) Toronto, Ontario, Canada
- Height: 5 ft 9 in (175 cm)
- Weight: 165 lb (75 kg; 11 st 11 lb)
- Position: Centre
- Shot: Right
- Played for: Winnipeg Jets
- NHL draft: 95th overall, 1971; Montreal Canadiens
- Playing career: 1971–1985

Peter Gerald Sullivan (born July 25, 1951) is a Canadian former professional ice hockey centre who played for the Winnipeg Jets.

== Early life ==
As a youth, he and teammate Mike Murphy played in the 1963 Quebec International Pee-Wee Hockey Tournament with a minor ice hockey from North York.

== Career ==
During his career, Sullivan played 126 games in the National Hockey League and 313 games in the World Hockey Association.

== Personal life ==
Sullivan's father, Frank, won a gold medal for Canada in ice hockey at the 1928 Winter Olympics and a Grey Cup championship for the Toronto Argonauts in 1921.

== Career statistics ==
=== Regular season and playoffs ===
			Regular season					Playoffs
Season	Team	League	GP	G	A	Pts	PIM	GP	G	A	Pts	PIM
1967–68	Toronto St. Michael's Majors	THL	—	—	—	—	—	—	—	—	—	—
1968–69	Peterborough Petes	OHA	4	1	0	1	0	—	—	—	—	—
1968–69	St. Michael's Buzzers	MetJAHL	—	—	—	—	—	—	—	—	—	—
1969–70	Oshawa Generals	OHA	52	40	30	70	16	6	3	2	5	0
1970–71	Oshawa Generals	OHA	61	29	23	52	26	—	—	—	—	—
1971–72	Mount Royal College	AJHL	26	14	19	33	4	—	—	—	—	—
1971–72	Muskegon Mohawks	IHL	1	0	0	0	0	—	—	—	—	—
1971–72	St. Petersburg Suns	EHL	5	2	1	3	0	—	—	—	—	—
1972–73	Nova Scotia Voyageurs	AHL	39	10	14	24	8	13	1	0	1	2
1973–74	Nova Scotia Voyageurs	AHL	74	30	40	70	22	6	5	4	9	2
1974–75	Nova Scotia Voyageurs	AHL	75	44	60	104	48	6	2	6	8	5
1975–76	Winnipeg Jets	WHA	78	32	39	71	22	13	6	7	13	0
1976–77	Winnipeg Jets	WHA	78	31	52	83	18	20	7	12	19	2
1977–78	Winnipeg Jets	WHA	77	16	39	55	22	9	3	4	7	4
1978–79	Winnipeg Jets	WHA	80	46	40	86	24	10	5	9	14	2
1979–80	Winnipeg Jets	NHL	79	24	35	59	20	—	—	—	—	—
1980–81	Winnipeg Jets	NHL	47	4	19	23	20	—	—	—	—	—
1981–82	SC Langnau	NLA	36	37	26	63	—	—	—	—	—	—
1981–82	Wichita Wind	CHL	15	12	11	23	0	7	5	2	7	0
1982–83	SC Langnau	NLA	35	31	33	64	—	—	—	—	—	—
1983–84	SC Bern	NLB	38	46	39	85	—	—	—	—	—	—
1984–85	SC Langenthal	NLB	38	53	29	82	—	—	—	—	—	—
1984–85	Moncton Golden Flames	AHL	5	2	3	5	0	—	—	—	—	—
1985–86	SC Langnau	NLB	36	34	27	61	—	—	—	—	—	—
1986–87	Genève-Servette HC	SWI-3	—	—	—	—	—	—	—	—	—	—
WHA totals			313	125	170	295	86	52	21	32	53	8
NHL totals			126	28	54	82	40	—	—	—	—	—
