= 1976–77 WHA season =

- League: World Hockey Association
- Sport: Ice hockey
- Duration: October 7, 1976 – May 26, 1977

Draft
- Top draft pick: Blair Chapman
- Picked by: Edmonton Oilers

Regular season
- Season champions: Houston Aeros
- Season MVP: Robbie Ftorek (Phoenix)
- Top scorer: Real Cloutier (Quebec)

Playoffs
- Playoffs MVP: Serge Bernier (Nordiques)

Avco Cup Final
- Champions: Quebec Nordiques
- Runners-up: Winnipeg Jets

WHA seasons
- 1975–76 1977–78

The 1976–77 WHA season was the fifth season of the World Hockey Association (WHA). Prior to the season, the Toronto Toros moved to Birmingham, Alabama and became the Birmingham Bulls. The Cleveland Crusaders attempted to move to South Florida, but instead became the short-lived second incarnation of the Minnesota Fighting Saints and folded after playing 42 games. With the death of the Saints, the WHA left the last market it had been sharing with the NHL. The remaining 11 teams finished the season, playing 80 or 81 games.

With the reduction of teams before the start of the season, the league returned to a two-division setup, eliminating the Canadian Division.

The Avco World Trophy winners were the Quebec Nordiques, defeating the Winnipeg Jets four games to three; it was the only WHA final series that went the full seven games.

== Regular season standings ==
Eastern Division
	GP	W	L	T	GF	GA	PTS
Quebec Nordiques	81	47	31	3	353	295	97
Cincinnati Stingers	81	39	37	5	354	303	83
Indianapolis Racers	81	36	37	8	276	305	80
New England Whalers	81	35	40	6	275	290	76
Birmingham Bulls	81	31	46	4	289	309	66
Minnesota Fighting Saints	42	19	18	5	136	129	43

Western Division
	GP	W	L	T	GF	GA	PTS
Houston Aeros	80	50	24	6	320	241	106
Winnipeg Jets	80	46	32	2	366	291	94
San Diego Mariners	81	40	37	4	284	283	85
Edmonton Oilers	81	34	43	4	243	304	72
Calgary Cowboys	81	31	43	7	252	296	69
Phoenix Roadrunners	80	28	48	4	281	383	60

== Player stats ==
=== Scoring leaders ===
_{Bolded numbers indicate season leaders}

GP = Games played; G = Goals; A = Assists; Pts = Points; PIM = Penalty minutes

Player	Team	GP	G	A	Pts	PIM
Real Cloutier	Quebec Nordiques	76	66	75	**141**	39
Anders Hedberg	Winnipeg Jets	68	**70**	61	131	48
Ulf Nilsson	Winnipeg Jets	71	39	**85**	124	89
Robbie Ftorek	Phoenix Roadrunners	80	46	71	117	86
Andre Lacroix	San Diego Mariners	81	32	82	114	79
Marc Tardif	Quebec Nordiques	62	49	60	109	65
Rich Leduc	Cincinnati Stingers	81	52	55	107	75
Chris Bordeleau	Quebec Nordiques	72	32	75	107	34
Blaine Stoughton	Cincinnati Stingers	81	52	52	104	39
Mark Napier	Birmingham Bulls	80	60	36	96	24
Dennis Sobchuk	Cincinnati Stingers	81	44	52	96	38
Serge Bernier	Quebec Nordiques	74	43	53	96	94

=== Leading goaltenders ===
_{Bolded numbers indicate season leaders}

GP = Games played; Min = Minutes played; W = Wins; L = Losses; T = Ties, GA = Goals against; GA = Goals against; SO = Shutouts; SV% = Save percentage; GAA = Goals against average

Player	Team	GP	Min	W	L	T	GA	SO	SV%	GAA
Ron Grahame	Houston Aeros	39	2345	27	10	2	107	**4**	90.1	**2.74**
Ernie Wakely	San Diego Mariners	46	2506	22	18	1	129	3	89.6	3.09
Cap Raeder	New England Whalers	26	1328	12	10	1	69	2	**90.2**	3.12
Wayne Rutledge	Houston Aeros	42	2512	23	14	4	132	3	89.8	3.15
Joe Daley	Winnipeg Jets	65	**3813**	**39**	21	2	206	3	89.2	3.24

== Avco World Trophy Playoffs ==
Quarterfinals
E1	Quebec Nordiques	4
E4	New England Whalers	1
Eastern Division
E2	Cincinnati Stingers	0
E3	Indianapolis Racers	4
W1	Houston Aeros	4
W4	Edmonton Oilers	1
Western Division
W2	Winnipeg Jets	4
W3	San Diego Mariners	3

Semifinals
E1	Quebec Nordiques	4
E3	Indianapolis Racers	1
W1	Houston Aeros	2
W2	Winnipeg Jets	4

Finals
E1	Quebec Nordiques	4
W2	Winnipeg Jets	3

== WHA awards ==
=== Trophies ===
Avco World Trophy:	Quebec Nordiques
Gordie Howe Trophy:	Robbie Ftorek, Phoenix Roadrunners
Bill Hunter Trophy:	Real Cloutier, Quebec Nordiques
Lou Kaplan Trophy:	George Lyle, New England Whalers
Ben Hatskin Trophy:	Ron Grahame, Houston Aeros
Dennis A. Murphy Trophy:	Ron Plumb, Cincinnati Stingers
Paul Deneau Trophy:	Dave Keon, New England Whalers
Howard Baldwin Trophy:	Bill Dineen, Houston Aeros
WHA Playoff MVP:	Serge Bernier, Quebec Nordiques

=== All-Star Team ===
Position	First Team	Second Team
Centre	Robbie Ftorek, Phoenix	Ulf Nilsson, Winnipeg
Right Wing	Anders Hedberg, Winnipeg	Real Cloutier, Quebec
Left Wing	Marc Tardif, Quebec	Rick Dudley, Cincinnati
Defence	Darryl Maggs, Indianapolis	Poul Popiel, Houston
Defence	Ron Plumb, Cincinnati	Mark Howe, Houston
Goaltender	John Garrett, Birmingham	Joe Daley, Winnipeg
