= 1976 WHA playoffs =

WHA postseason tournament

Tournament details
- Dates: April 9 – May 27, 1976
- Season: 1975–76
- Teams: 10
- Defending champions: Houston Aeros

Final positions
- Champions: Winnipeg Jets (1st title)
- Runners-up: Houston Aeros

Tournament statistics
- Scoring leader(s): Ulf Nilsson (Jets) (26 points)

Awards
- MVP: Ulf Nilsson (Jets)

The 1976 WHA playoffs was the postseason tournament of the World Hockey Association's 1975–76 season. The fourth WHA tournament, it was the only one with ten teams in competition with each other. The Winnipeg Jets won the Avco Cup over the Houston Aeros for their first ever championship. Ulf Nilsson was named the WHA Playoff MVP.

== Playoff seeds ==
- Houston Aeros, Western Division champions – 106 points
- Winnipeg Jets, Canadian Division champions – 106 points
- Quebec Nordiques – 104 points
- Calgary Cowboys – 86 points
- Phoenix Roadrunners– 84 points
- San Diego Mariners – 78 points
- Indianapolis Racers, Eastern Division champions – 76 points
- Cleveland Crusaders – 75 points
- New England Whalers – 73 points
- Edmonton Oilers – 59 points

== Bracket ==
Quarterfinals; April 9- April 30
W1	Houston Aeros	4
W3	San Diego Mariners	2
E3	New England Whalers	4
E1	Indianapolis Racers	3
C3	Calgary Cowboys	4
C2	Quebec Nordiques	1
C1	Winnipeg Jets	4
C4	Edmonton Oilers	0
Preliminary Round
New England Whalers	3
Cleveland Crusaders	0

Semifinals; April 23 - May 16
W1	Houston Aeros	4
E3	New England Whalers	3
C1	Winnipeg Jets	4
C3	Calgary Cowboys	1
Preliminary Round
San Diego Mariners	3
Phoenix Roadrunners	2

Avco Cup; May 20 - May 27
'
C1	Winnipeg Jets	4
W1	Houston Aeros	0

== Preliminary Round ==
=== San Diego Mariners vs. Phoenix Roadrunners ===
Phoenix had gone 9–3 against San Diego in the regular season. In Game 1, left winger Del Hall took a pass from Robbie Ftorek at the blue line and skated for a shot on the goalie that was partially stopped by goaltender Ernie Wakely but defenseman Brent Hughes accidentally collided with Wakely when trying to get back into the play that saw the puck slip into the net for the game-winner in overtime. Apparently, in the pre-game session for Game 4, Mariners head coach Ron Ingram and the whole team was put under hypnosis by a local hypnotist; San Diego proceeded to dominate the matchup, taking the lead in the first two minutes of the game and never trailing. Unusually, Game 5 had no penalties called for the duration of the game; Norm Ferguson gave the Mariners the go-ahead goal to win a game where Phoenix failed on all ten shots in the third period. It also was the last professional hockey playoff game played in the state of Arizona until the Phoenix Coyotes played in 1997.

April 9	San Diego Mariners	2–3 (OT) (1–2, 1–0, 0–0, 0–1)	Phoenix Roadrunners	Arizona Veterans Memorial Coliseum; Attendance: 6,945

Box score
Ernie Wakely	Goalies	Jack Norris
10:46 (1st) – Wayne Rivers; 16:24 (2nd) – Bob Falkenberg / Goals / 2:51 (1st) – Gary Veneruzzo; 8:54 (1st) – Serge Beaudoin; 0:31 (OT) – Del Hall
25 (10–9–6–0)	Shots	29 (9–7–12–1)

April 10	Phoenix Roadrunners	2–4 (1–1, 0–1, 1–2)	San Diego Mariners	San Diego Sports Arena; Attendance: 5,966

Box score
Jack Norris	Goalies	Ernie Wakely
13:36 (1st) – Jim Boyd; 6:34 (3rd) – Jim Boyd / Goals / 5:05 (1st) – John French; 4:43 (2nd) – Joe Noris; 6:48 (3rd) – Norm Ferguson; 10:14 (3rd) – Andre Lacroix
24 (7–13–4)	Shots	37 (9–12–16)

April 13	San Diego Mariners	4–6 (4–1, 0–4, 0–1)	Phoenix Roadrunners	Arizona Veterans Memorial Coliseum; Attendance: 6,374

Box score
Ernie Wakely	Goalies	Jack Norris
6:29 (1st) – Brent Hughes; 8:00 (1st) – Gene Peacosh; 16:31 (1st) – Ray Adduono; 16:55 (1st) – John French / Goals / 3:28 (1st) – Del Hall; 5:53 (2nd) – Jim Boyd; 12:05 (2nd) – Robbie Ftorek; 17:35 (2nd) – Gary Veneruzzo; 18:37 (2nd) – Ron Huston; 5:08 (3rd) – Lauri Mononen
24 (10–6–8)	Shots	40 (16–14–10)

April 15	Phoenix Roadrunners	1–5 (0–2, 0–1, 1–2)	San Diego Mariners	San Diego Sports Arena; Attendance: 6,638

Box score
Jack Norris	Goalies	Ernie Wakely
3:05 (3rd) – Cam Connor / Goals / 18:01 (1st) – Kevin Devine; 19:16 (1st) – Brian Morenz; 3:36 (2nd) – Andre Lacroix; 7:26 (3rd) – Alex Tidey; 19:39 (3rd) – Bob Wall
21 (3–7–11)	Shots	33 (11–15–7)

April 17	San Diego Mariners	2–1 (1–0, 1–1, 0–0)	Phoenix Roadrunners	Arizona Veterans Memorial Coliseum; Attendance: 9,237

Box score
Ernie Wakely	Goalies	Jack Norris
5:08 (1st) – Alex Tidey; 17:07 (2nd) – Norm Ferguson / Goals / 16:02 (2nd) – John Gray
23 (9–11–3)	Shots	30 (10–10–10)

=== New England Whalers vs. Cleveland Crusaders ===
New England had gone 6–3–1 against Cleveland in the regular season. Mike Rogers delivered the go-ahead goal in Game 3 with four minutes remaining to eliminate Cleveland. This was the final game played by the Crusaders in Cleveland, as they relocated to Minnesota in the offseason when the National Hockey League approved the move of the California Golden Seals to Cleveland.

April 9	Cleveland Crusaders	3–5 (1–3, 1–1, 1–1)	New England Whalers	Hartford Civic Center; Attendance: 8,417

Box score
Bob Johnson	Goalies	Bruce Landon
19:11 (1st) – Rich Leduc; 1:00 (2nd) – Wayne Connelly; 8:30 (3rd) – Danny Gruen / Goals / 1:12 (1st) – Ralph Backstrom; 3:15 (1st) – Gordie Roberts; 9:57 (1st) – Nick Fotiu; 10:07 (2nd) – Larry Pleau; 6:23 (3rd) – Mike Rogers
31 (10–10–11)	Shots	33 (10–16–7)

April 10	New England Whalers	6–1 (1–1, 2–0, 3–0)	Cleveland Crusaders	Richfield Coliseum; Attendance: 4,243

Box score
Bruce Landon	Goalies	Cam Newton
17:56 (1st) – Larry Pleau; 10:50 (2nd) – Fred O'Donnell; 12:02 (2nd) – Tom Webster; 5:36 (3rd) – Larry Pleau; 9:45 (3rd) – Brad Selwood; 13:05 (3rd) – Mike Rogers / Goals / 5:40 (1st) – Rich Leduc
40; 13–9–18)	Shots	30 (11–11–8)

April 11	New England Whalers	3–2 (0–2, 1–0, 2–0)	Cleveland Crusaders	Richfield Coliseum; Attendance: 3,584

Box score
Bruce Landon	Goalies	Bob Johnson
18:15 (2nd) – Bob McManama; 15:05 (3rd) – Ralph Backstrom; 16:38 (3rd) – Mike Rogers / Goals / 0:53 (1st) – Danny Gruen; 9:27 (1st) – Al McDonough
36 (12–11–13)	Shots	35 (16–9–10)

== Quarterfinals ==
=== (C1) Winnipeg Jets vs. (E4) Edmonton Oilers ===
Winnipeg went 8–4–1 against Edmonton in the regular season.

In Game 2, goaltender Joe Daley was involved in a high-sticking incident with Oilers player Rusty Patenaude that saw Edmonton coach Bill Hunter demand for Daley to receive a suspension. Daley was suspended for Game 3, but backup goalie Curt Larsson held firm with a 3-2 victory.

April 9	Edmonton Oilers	3–7 (1–3, 1–2, 1–2)	Winnipeg Jets	Winnipeg Arena; Attendance: 8,688

Box score
Dave Dryden	Goalies	Joe Daley
19:02 (1st) – Bob Russell; 19:03 (2nd) – Ken Baird; 19:58 (3rd) – Tim Sheehy / Goals / 3:32 (1st) – Bobby Hull; 4:55 (1st) – Bob Guindon; 18:21 (1st) – Mats Lindh; 12:21 (2nd) – Veli-Pekka Ketola; 17:24 (2nd) – Thommie Bergman; 6:56 (3rd) – Norm Beaudin; 8:57 (3rd) – Peter Sullivan
21 (7–6–8)	Shots	48 (18–13–17)

April 11	Edmonton Oilers	4–5 (OT) (1–1, 2–2, 1–1, 0–1)	Winnipeg Jets	Winnipeg Arena; Attendance: 9,436

Box score
Dave Dryden	Goalies	Joe Daley / Curt Larsson
11:15 (1st) – Dan Spring; 7:08 (2nd) – Ed Patenaude; 12:46 (2nd) – Ken Baird; 18:10 (3rd) – Tim Sheehy / Goals / 9:41 (1st) – Lyle Moffat; 3:22 (2nd) – Ulf Nilsson; 17:10 (2nd) – Bobby Hull; 5:05 (3rd) – Willy Lindström; 0:54 (OT) – Ulf Nilsson
24 (10–11–3–0)	Shots	62 (24–16–21–1)

April 14	Winnipeg Jets	3–2 (2–0, 0–2, 1–0)	Edmonton Oilers	Northlands Coliseum; Attendance: 7,880

Box score
Curt Larsson	Goalies	Dave Dryden
3:57 (1st) – Anders Hedberg; 9:34 (1st) – Peter Sullivan; 10:22 (3rd) – Bobby Hull / Goals / 8:52 (2nd) – Bob McAneeley; 18:13 (2nd) – Ken Baird
29 (10–10–9)	Shots	29 (12–12–5)

April 16	Winnipeg Jets	7–2 (1–1, 5–1, 1–0)	Edmonton Oilers	Northlands Coliseum; Attendance: 13,004

Box score
Joe Daley	Goalies	Chris Worthy
4:25 (1st) – Bobby Hull; 4:54 (2nd) – Veli-Pekka Ketola; 8:08 (2nd) – Bill Lesuk; 13:40 (2nd) – Mats Lindh; 15:27 (2nd) – Bobby Hull; 16:46 (2nd) – Norm Beaudin; 13:26 (3rd) – Freeman Asmundson / Goals / 6:15 (1st) – Wayne Carleton; 6:43 (2nd) – Norm Ullman
38 (13–14–11)	Shots	20 (5–13–2)

=== (C3) Calgary Cowboys vs. (C2) Quebec Nordiques ===
Calgary had gone 5–4–1 against Quebec in their regular season matchups. In a shocking upset, the Cowboys prevailed over the Nordiques. However, it mostly became known for an infamous brawl during Game 2 that saw eleven ejections, a coach suspended the rest of the series, and criminal matters. The incident began when Calgary's Rick Jodzio cross-checked Quebec's Marc Tardif in the head, causing both teams to leave their benches. The brawl lasted 20 minutes, and ended only when Quebec police gathered at the players benches and escorted the teams back to their dressing rooms. The game resumed following a 20-minute break to allow both teams to cool down, then resumed without eleven players who were ejected from the game. The incident caught the attention of Quebec's Solicitor General Fernand Lalonde, who had the incident investigated as a criminal matter. Tardif had a concussion and didn't play for the rest of the series while the team publicly stated their desire to boycott the rest of the series unless their demands were met: the lifetime suspension of Jodzio, a suspension for Calgary head coach Joe Crozier (who reportedly told Jodzio to "get" Tardif) and the firing of WHA vice-president of hockey operations Bud Poile (who the team felt had a bias against them). Jodzio was suspended indefinitely by the league and later pleaded guilty in a Quebec court to a charge of assault over the incident. Crozier was suspended for the rest of the series and Poile resigned in the wake of the suspensions. Both teams were fined $25,000 while Quebec coach Jean-Guy Gendron was suspended for Game 3 (having stepped on the ice to challenge Crozier to a fight). As for the hockey after the brawl, Calgary scored a litany of goals to win Game 2 before Calgary and Quebec then had close victories, but Calgary pulled away with the go-ahead goal in Game 5 by Danny Lawson with five minutes remaining to pull ahead and eliminate Quebec.

April 10	Calgary Cowboys	3–1 (1–0, 1–0, 1–1)	Quebec Nordiques	Colisée de Québec; Attendance: 10,997

Box score
Don McLeod	Goalies	Richard Brodeur
16:05 (1st) – Chris Evans; 9:26 (2nd) – Ron Chipperfield; 17:59 (3rd) – Chris Evans / Goals / 2:40 (3rd) – Real Cloutier
24 (9–5–10)	Shots	28 (10–7–11)

April 11	Calgary Cowboys	8–4 (2–2, 0–2, 6–0)	Quebec Nordiques	Colisée de Québec; Attendance: 9,567

Box score
Don McLeod	Goalies	Richard Brodeur
12:12 (1st) – George Morrison; 17:51 (1st) – Don Tannahill; 3:27 (3rd) – George Morrison; 6:56 (3rd) – Gavin Kirk; 9:24 (3rd) – Bernie Lukowich; 10:16 (3rd) – Ron Chipperfield; 15:35 (3rd) – Gavin Kirk; 17:31 (3rd) – Lynn Powis / Goals / 3:43 (1st) – Marc Tardif; 15:10 (1st) – Serge Bernier; 2:10 (2nd) – Bob Fitchner; 10:28 (2nd) – Serge Bernier
29 (8–8–13)	Shots	25 (8–8–9)

April 14	Quebec Nordiques	2–3 (0–1, 1–1, 1–1)	Calgary Cowboys	Stampede Corral; Attendance: 7,201

Box score
Richard Brodeur	Goalies	Don McLeod
6:49 (2nd) – Real Cloutier; 19:05 (3rd) – Dale Hoganson / Goals / 1:06 (1st) – Lynn Powis; 6:14 (2nd) – Lynn Powis; 6:15 (3rd) – Bernie Lukowich
20 (5–8–7)	Shots	27 (14–9–4)

April 16	Quebec Nordiques	4–3 (0–1, 4–0, 0–2)	Calgary Cowboys	Stampede Corral; Attendance: 7,945

Box score
Richard Brodeur	Goalies	Don McLeod
10:06 (2nd) – Real Cloutier; 11:13 (2nd) – Rejean Houle; 18:40 (2nd) – Real Cloutier; 19:14 (2nd) – Rejean Houle / Goals / 13:27 (1st) – Ron Chipperfield; 8:26 (3rd) – Gavin Kirk; 12:27 (3rd) – Danny Lawson
25 (8–12–5)	Shots	29 (8–9–12)

April 18	Calgary Cowboys	6–4 (2–0, 1–3, 3–1)	Quebec Nordiques	Colisée de Québec; Attendance: 12,675

Box score
Richard Brodeur	Goalies	Don McLeod
4:57 (1st) – Peter Driscoll; 19:59 (1st) – George Morrison; 2:49 (2nd) – Chris Evans; 3:13 (3rd) – Bernie Lukowich; 14:53 (3rd) – Danny Lawson; 19:56 (3rd) – Chris Evans / Goals / 4:36 (2nd) – Christian Bordeleau; 5:26 (2nd) – Pierre Roy; 18:12 (2nd) – Steve Sutherland; 8:38 (3rd) – Steve Sutherland
28 (11–6–11)	Shots	41 (13–15–13)

=== (E3) New England Whalers vs. (E1) Indianapolis Racers ===
Indianapolis had gone 7–2–3 against New England in the regular season. In a stunning upset that saw four shutouts, the New England Whalers won three of the first four games before Indianapolis won two straight to force a Game 7. New England won the series on the road with a 6–0 shutout. As it turned out, this was the only WHA postseason series where a team forced a Game 7 after being down 3–1.

April 16	New England Whalers	4–1 (1–1, 1–0, 2–0)	Indianapolis Racers	Market Square Arena; Attendance: 10,834

Box score
Bruce Landon	Goalies	Michel Dion
2:36 (1st) – Larry Pleau; 2:03 (2nd) – Rosaire Paiement; 3:59 (3rd) – Doug Roberts; 19:20 (3rd) – Ralph Backstrom / Goals / 16:34 (1st) – Michel Parizeau
32 (15–7–10)	Shots	24 (8–8–8)

April 17	New England Whalers	0–4 (0–2, 0–1, 0–1)	Indianapolis Racers	Market Square Arena; Attendance: 10,111

Box score
Cap Raeder	Goalies	Jim Park
No scoring / Goals / 4:04 (1st) – Kerry Bond; 10:16 (1st) – Michel Parizeau; 12:46 (2nd) – Hugh Harris; 18:13 (3rd) – Rene LeClerc
29 (11–6–12)	Shots	25 (11–6–8)

April 21	Indianapolis Racers	0–3 (0–1, 0–1, 0–1)	New England Whalers	Hartford Civic Center; Attendance: 9,681

Box score
Michel Dion	Goalies	Cap Raeder
13:45 (1st) – Al Hangsleben; 13:11 (2nd) – Garry Swain; 8:53 (3rd) – Al Hangsleben / Goals / No scoring
22 (9–5–8)	Shots	34 (10–14–10)

April 23	Indianapolis Racers	1–2 (0–0, 0–1, 1–1)	New England Whalers	Hartford Civic Center; Attendance: 10,507

Box score
Michel Dion	Goalies	Cap Raeder
3:01 (3rd) – Hugh Harris / Goals / 8:14 (2nd) – Larry Pleau; 19:03 (3rd) – Mike Rogers
33 (9–14–10)	Shots	39 (8–16–15)

April 24	New England Whalers	0–4 (0–1, 0–2, 0–1)	Indianapolis Racers	Market Square Arena; Attendance: 11,811

Box score
Cap Raeder	Goalies	Jim Park
No scoring / Goals / 13:17 (1st) – Reg Thomas; 5:59 (2nd) – Michel Parizeau; 18:26 (2nd) – Michel Parizeau; 10:11 (3rd) – Dave Keon
30 (13–5–12)	Shots	34 (14–11–9)

April 27	Indianapolis Racers	5–3 (0–0, 4–1, 1–2)	New England Whalers	Hartford Civic Center; Attendance: 10,507

Box score
Jim Park	Goalies	Cap Raeder
2:12 (2nd) – Darryl Maggs; 7:58 (2nd) – Nick Harbaruk; 18:02 (2nd) – Rene LeClerc; 19:00 (2nd) – Dave Keon; 8:35 (3rd) – Nick Harbaruk / Goals / 15:35 (2nd) – Tom Webster; 11:32 (3rd) – Nick Fotiu; 14:04 (3rd) – Bob McManama
31 (10–12–9)	Shots	37 (7–15–15)

April 29	New England Whalers	6–0 (1–0, 3–0, 2–0)	Indianapolis Racers	Market Square Arena; Attendance: 16,040

Box score
Cap Raeder	Goalies	Jim Park
17:45 (1st) – Danny Bolduc; 9:05 (2nd) – Tom Webster; 12:28 (2nd) – Fred O'Donnell; 14:34 (2nd) – Garry Swain; 5:38 (3rd) – Rosaire Paiement; 8:58 (3rd) – Ralph Backstrom / Goals / No scoring
29 (10–9–10)	Shots	26 (7–11–8)

=== (W1) Houston Aeros vs. (W3) San Diego Mariners ===
Houston had gone 7–5 against San Diego in the regular season.

April 21	San Diego Mariners	6–8 (2–6, 2–2, 2–0)	Houston Aeros	The Summitt; Attendance: 8,257

Box score
Ernie Wakely / Russ Gillow	Goalies	Ron Grahame
13:02 (1st) – John French; 17:09 (1st) – Andre Lacroix; 2:44 (2nd) – John French; 13:19 (2nd) – Brian Morenz; 2:15 (3rd) – Ray Adduono; 10:31 (3rd) – Wayne Rivers / Goals / 4:52 (1st) – Rich Preston; 5:31 (1st) – Rich Preston; 11:48 (1st) – Gord Labossiere; 17:55 (1st) – Gord Labossiere; 19:29 (1st) – Terry Ruskowski; 19:59 (1st) – Terry Ruskowski; 0:42 (2nd) – Rich Preston; 2:15 (2nd) – Frank Hughes
27 (6–7–14)	Shots	39 (14–6–19)

April 23	San Diego Mariners	1–3 (0–0, 0–2, 1–1)	Houston Aeros	The Summitt; Attendance: 10,151

Box score
Ernie Wakely	Goalies	Ron Grahame
17:12 (3rd) – Andre Lacroix / Goals / 6:54 (2nd) – John Tonelli; 11:06 (2nd) – Frank Hughes; 1:03 (3rd) – Gordie Howe
26 (10–8–8)	Shots	27 (8–8–11)

April 25	Houston Aeros	8–4 (1–1, 4–2, 3–1)	San Diego Mariners	San Diego Sports Arena; Attendance: 8,584

Box score
Ron Grahame	Goalies	Ernie Wakely
12:13 (1st) – Marty Howe; 4:50 (2nd) – John Schella; 11:47 (2nd) – John Tonelli; 17:14 (2nd) – Gordie Howe; 18:39 (2nd) – Don Larway; 1:34 (3rd) – Don Larway; 8:52 (3rd) – John Tonelli; 11:42 (3rd) – Don Larway / Goals / 7:53 (1st) – Alex Tidey; 11:20 (2nd) – Kevin Morrison; 19:59 (2nd) – Ray Adduono; 9:37 (3rd) – Joe Noris
34 (10–12–12)	Shots	32 (10–10–12)

April 27	Houston Aeros	2–3 (1–0, 0–1, 1–2)	San Diego Mariners	San Diego Sports Arena; Attendance: 5,861

Box score
Ron Grahame	Goalies	Ernie Wakely
3:15 (1st) – Don Larway; 19:28 (3rd) – John Tonelli / Goals / 8:35 (2nd) – Wayne Rivers; 5:00 (3rd) – Bob Dobek; 6:47 (3rd) – Kevin Devine
36 (10–15–11)	Shots	39 (21–8–10)

April 28	San Diego Mariners	3–2 (1–0, 2–1, 0–1)	Houston Aeros	The Summitt; Attendance: 7,622

Box score
Ron Grahame	Goalies	Ernie Wakely
4:24 (1st) – Ray Adduono; 2:11 (2nd) – Gene Peacosh; 17:26 (2nd) – Kevin Devine / Goals / 15:53 (2nd) – John Tonelli; 10:20 (3rd) – Gordie Howe
27 (7–8–12)	Shots	28 (14–7–7)

April 30	Houston Aeros	3–2 (1–0, 1–0, 1–2)	San Diego Mariners	San Diego Sports Arena; Attendance: 11,161

Box score
Wayne Rutledge	Goalies	Ernie Wakely
4:57 (1st) – Frank Hughes; 13:29 (2nd) – Rich Preston; 11:34 (3rd) – Murray Hall / Goals / 12:20 (3rd) – Don Burgess; 19:29 (3rd) – Wayne Rivers
23 (7–10–6)	Shots	43 (12–17–14)

== Semifinals ==
=== (C1) Winnipeg Jets vs. (C3) Calgary Cowboys ===
Winnipeg had gone 8–4 against Calgary in the regular season. In Game 3, Lynn Powis and Don Tannahill each recorded a goal three seconds apart from each other, the fastest in WHA history.

April 23	Calgary Cowboys	1–6 (0–3, 0–3, 1–0)	Winnipeg Jets	Winnipeg Arena; Attendance: 10,069

Box score
Don McLeod / Ed Humphreys	Goalies	Joe Daley
2:20 (3rd) – Chris Evans / Goals / 4:50 (1st) – Willy Lindstrom; 11:51 (1st) – Ulf Nilsson; 15:46 (1st) – Peter Sullivan; 2:42 (2nd) – Bobby Hull; 7:06 (2nd) – Bob Guindon; 13:04 (2nd) – Veli-Pekka Ketola
17 (4–8–5)	Shots	29 (9–11–9)

April 25	Calgary Cowboys	2–3 (1–2, 1–0, 0–1)	Winnipeg Jets	Winnipeg Arena; Attendance: 9,666

Box score
Don McLeod	Goalies	Joe Daley
3:09 (1st) – Ron Chipperfield; 3:09 (2nd) – Warren Miller / Goals / 9:53 (1st) – Bobby Hull; 13:35 (1st) – Bobby Hull; 1:32 (3rd) – Anders Hedberg
22 (10–7–5)	Shots	45 (15–15–15)

April 28	Winnipeg Jets	6–3 (1–0, 1–3, 4–0)	Calgary Cowboys	Stampede Corral; Attendance: 7,355

Box score
Joe Daley	Goalies	Don McLeod
19:26 (1st) – Bobby Hull; 8:26 (2nd) – Anders Hedberg; 1:39 (3rd) – Anders Hedberg; 11:07 (3rd) – Mike Ford; 14:42 (3rd) – Veli-Pekka Ketola; 17:38 (3rd) – Bill Lesuk / Goals / 4:08 (2nd) – Lynn Powis; 4:11 (2nd) – Don Tannahill; 7:49 (3rd) – Peter Driscoll
35 (10–12–13)	Shots	32 (6–17–9)

April 30	Winnipeg Jets	3–7 (1–3, 1–2, 1–2)	Calgary Cowboys	Stampede Corral; Attendance: 6,458

Box score
Joe Daley	Goalies	Don McLeod
4:04 (1st) – Anders Hedberg; 13:50 (2nd) – Ulf Nilsson; 17:36 (3rd) – Thommie Bergman / Goals / 3:12 (1st) – Danny Lawson; 3:52 (1st) – Gavin Kirk; 16:00 (1st) – Bob Leiter; 6:33 (2nd) – Bob Leiter; 10:31 (2nd) – Lynn Powis; 10:52 (3rd) – Ron Chipperfield; 15:11 (3rd) – Danny Lawson
31 (11–7–13)	Shots	26 (11–8–7)

May 2	Calgary Cowboys	0–4 (0–0, 0–1, 0–3)	Winnipeg Jets	Winnipeg Arena; Attendance: 8,700

Box score
Don McLeod	Goalies	Joe Daley
No scoring / Goals / 7:23 (2nd) – Anders Hedberg; 1:36 (3rd) – Anders Hedberg; 3:48 (3rd) – Willy Lindstrom; 19:06 (3rd) – Freeman Asmundson
17 (6–7–4)	Shots	31 (13–10–8)

=== (W1) Houston Aeros vs. (E3) New England Whalers ===
Houston went 4–2 against New England in the regular season. The Aeros set a club record in Game 2 with the fastest time to score three goals in the second period, with Terry Ruskowski, John Tonelli, and Ted Taylor scoring goals in the span of 1:17 to bolster an eventual 5-2 victory.

May 5	New England Whalers	4–2 (0–0, 3–2, 1–0)	Houston Aeros	The Summitt; Attendance: 9,331

Box score
Cap Raeder	Goalies	Ron Grahame
6:23 (2nd) – Tom Webster; 12:07 (2nd) – Tom Webster; 19:11 (2nd) – Rosaire Paiement; 15:03 (3rd) – Tom Webster / Goals / 13:40 (2nd) – Marty Howe; 15:07 (2nd) – Larry Lund
18 (5–10–3)	Shots	30 (9–10–11)

May 7	New England Whalers	2–5 (1–0, 0–4, 1–1)	Houston Aeros	The Summitt; Attendance: 12,739

Box score
Cap Raeder / Gaye Cooley	Goalies	Wayne Rutledge
8:41 (1st) – Thommy Abrahamsson; 5:11 (3rd) – Bob McManama / Goals / 5:28 (2nd) – Terry Ruskowski; 6:04 (2nd) – John Tonelli; 6:39 (2nd) – Ted Taylor; 19:49 (2nd) – Mark Howe; 7:32 (3rd) – Andre Hinse
21 (6–6–9)	Shots	32 (10–12–10)

May 9	Houston Aeros	1–4 (0–2, 0–1, 1–1)	New England Whalers	Hartford Civic Center; Attendance: 10,507

Box score
Wayne Rutledge	Goalies	Cap Raeder
16:20 (3rd) – Mark Howe / Goals / 8:13 (1st) – Rosaire Paiement; 9:45 (1st) – Don Borgeson; 9:51 (2nd) – Thommy Abrahamsson; 14:35 (3rd) – Bob McManama
30 (9–7–14)	Shots	34 (16–10–8)

May 11	Houston Aeros	4–3 (3–0, 1–1, 0–2)	New England Whalers	Hartford Civic Center; Attendance: 10,507

Box score
Ron Grahame	Goalies	Cap Raeder / Gaye Cooley
10:16 (1st) – Poul Popiel; 12:42 (1st) – Poul Popiel; 13:12 (1st) – Jan Popiel; 14:21 (2nd) – Terry Ruskowski / Goals / 9:00 (2nd) – Brad Selwood; 2:31 (3rd) – Tom Webster; 10:41 (3rd) – Gordie Roberts
25 (11–6–8)	Shots	35 (8–15–12)

May 13	New England Whalers	2–4 (1–0, 0–2, 1–2)	Houston Aeros	The Summitt; Attendance: 14,623

Box score
Cap Raeder / Christer Abrahamsson	Goalies	Ron Grahame
19:32 (1st) – Tom Webster; 16:08 (3rd) – Rick Ley / Goals / 7:08 (2nd) – John Tonelli; 17:01 (2nd) – Frank Hughes; 0:53 (3rd) – Terry Ruskowski; 13:39 (3rd) – Andre Hinse
27 (10–7–10)	Shots	45 (15–16–14)

May 15	Houston Aeros	1–6 (0–1, 0–3, 1–2)	New England Whalers	Hartford Civic Center; Attendance: 10,507

Box score
Ron Grahame / Wayne Rutledge	Goalies	Cap Raeder
13:29 (3rd) – Don Larway / Goals / 18:52 (1st) – Mike Rogers; 0:31 (2nd) – Nick Fotiu; 3:07 (2nd) – Ralph Backstrom; 5:28 (2nd) – Tom Webster; 5:53 (3rd) – Tom Webster; 19:11 (3rd) – Garry Swain
40 (9–13–18)	Shots	28 (11–10–7)

May 16	New England Whalers	0–2 (0–1, 0–0, 0–1)	Houston Aeros	The Summitt; Attendance: 14,718

Box score
Cap Raeder	Goalies	Ron Grahame
No scoring / Goals / 7:49 (1st) – Poul Popiel; 18:21 (3rd) – Mark Howe
21 (9–5–7)	Shots	37 (10–16–11)

== Avco Cup Final ==
=== (C1) Winnipeg Jets vs. (W1) Houston Aeros ===
The series matched the Canadian Division champion Winnipeg Jets, as coached by Bobby Kromm versus the Western Division champion Houston Aeros, as coached by Bill Dineen. Due to the way that the games played out in scheduling, the Jets had eighteen days of layoff prior to Game 1 while the Aeros had four. If the series had gone to Game 7, it would've been played on June 1. As it turned out, this was the only time a WHA game was scheduled for June. The two teams had split their four regular season matchups.

The first two games were tight affairs that set new records for attendance at an Avco Cup Final game. 14,794 attended Game 1 at the Summit and Bobby Hull broke a late tie with 3:17 remaining. Game 2 saw 15,256 reported fans and saw Bobby Hull score to break the 4-4 tie with 1:54 remaining. The Jets then rode a four-goal first period in Game 3 to win and set up the potential to clinch in Game 4. 10,386 people attended the game at Winnipeg Arena, the largest capacity to see a game all season. The Jets scored first on a goal by Bobby Hull five minutes into the game. Ted Taylor evened the score with his goal four minutes later, but Veli-Pekka Ketola broke the tie 37 seconds later with what ended up as the series-winning goal at 10:22 in the first period. The Jets scored another goal a minute later by Lyle Moffat to give them a 3–1 lead in the first period. The domination was on from there as Winnipeg scored four goals in the second period and two more in the third period to win 9–1 and make them the first Canadian team to win the Avco World Trophy.

Their strategy of play was noted in the press as emphasizing fast skating, fine passing and skill. The Cup victory was particularly enjoyable for Bobby Hull, who had been among the first players to sign with the Jets when they began as a franchise. It was the first championship for Hull since 1961, when he had won the Stanley Cup in his fourth year as a member of the Chicago Blackhawks, which coincidentally had faced Gordie Howe, then captain of the Detroit Red Wings. Defenseman Ted Green, who won the inaugural Avco World Trophy with New England in the 1973 WHA playoffs, became the first player to win the Trophy with multiple teams. Ulf Nilsson was named WHA Playoff MVP, having scored seven goals and nineteen assists for 26 points during the postseason. For the city, it was the first championship since the 50th Grey Cup victory by the CFL Blue Bombers in 1962. A parade and banquet were announced for the city following their championship.

May 20	Winnipeg Jets	4–3	Houston Aeros	The Summit	Recap
13:06 – Anders Hedberg (Hull, Nilsson); 15:34 – Lyle Moffat (Beaudin, Lindh)		First period	9:37 – Frank Hughes (Butters, Hale) 9:37; 19:35 – Mark Howe (West, Hale)
16:10 – pp – Anders Hedberg (Bergman)		Second period	No scoring
16:43 – Bobby Hull (Nilsson)		Third period	9:46 – Mark Howe (Preston)
Joe Daley 26 saves / 29 shots		Goalie stats	Ron Grahame 25 shots / 29 shots

May 23	Winnipeg Jets	5–4	Houston Aeros	The Summit	Recap
13:52 – Anders Hedberg (Nilsson)		First period	No scoring
2:17 – Willy Lindstrom (Sullivan, Bergman); 16:53 - Freeman Asmundson (Lesuk, Guindon)		Second period	1:22 – Gordie Howe (M. Howe, Schella); 12:44 – Marty Howe (Hall)
5:19 – Thommie Bergman; 18:06 – Bobby Hull (Bergman, Hedberg)		Third period	1:29 – Terry Ruskowski (Preston, Popiel); 3:23 – Marty Howe (Taylor, Popiel)
Joe Daley 28 saves / 32 shots		Goalie stats	Ron Grahame 21 saves / 26 shots

May 25	Houston Aeros	3–6	Winnipeg Jets	Winnipeg Arena	Recap
3:48 – pp – Mark Howe (Schella)		First period	2:24 – Veli-Pekka Ketola (Lindstrom, Riihiranta); 3:23 – sh – Ulf Nilsson (Hedberg); 8:49 – pp – Anders Hedberg (Ford, Ketola); 11:33 – pp – Peter Sullivan (Hull, Lindstrom)
14:28 – Don Larway (Marty Howe, Tonelli)		Second period	7:46 – Ulf Nilsson (Sjoberg)
13:22 – Don Larway (Tonelli, Ruskowski)		Third period	1:44 – Ulf Nilsson
Ron Grahame 19 saves / 25 shots		Goalie stats	Joe Daley 15 saves / 18 shots

May 27	Houston Aeros	1–9	Winnipeg Jets	Winnipeg Arena	Recap
9:45 – pp – Ted Taylor (Labossiere, Marty Howe)		First period	5:37 – pp – Bobby Hull (Ford, Nilsson); 10:22 – Veli-Pekka Ketola (Ford, Hull); 11:21 – Lyle Moffat (Sjoberg, Ford)
No scoring		Second period	1:07 – Veli-Pekka Ketola (Lindstrom, Sullivan); 3:11 – pp – Anders Hedberg (Nilsson, Hull); 9:19 – Anders Hedberg (Nilsson); 12:14 – Peter Sullivan (Hillman)
No scoring		Third period	1:33 – Peter Sullivan (Ford, Riihiranta); 9:30 – Bob Guindon (Riihiranta, Ketola) 9:30
Ron Grahame 24 saves / 33 shots		Goalie stats	Joe Daley 16 saves / 17 shots

Winnipeg won series 4–0

== Statistical leaders ==
=== Skaters ===
These were the top ten skaters based on points.

Player	Team	GP	G	A	Pts	+/–	PIM
Ulf Nilsson	Winnipeg Jets	13	7	19	26	15	6
Bobby Hull	Winnipeg Jets	13	12	8	20	15	4
Anders Hedberg	Winnipeg Jets	13	13	6	19	16	15
Tom Webster	New England Whalers	17	10	9	19	3	6
Mark Howe	Houston Aeros	17	6	10	16	0	18
Terry Ruskowski	Houston Aeros	16	6	10	16	8	64
Rosaire Paiement	New England Whalers	17	4	11	15	3	41
John Tonelli	Houston Aeros	17	7	7	14	8	8
Thommie Bergman	Winnipeg Jets	13	3	10	13	10	8
Mike Ford	Winnipeg Jets	12	1	12	13	8	8
Mike Rogers	New England Whalers	17	5	8	13	1	2
Peter Sullivan	Winnipeg Jets	13	6	7	13	7	0

== Championship roster ==
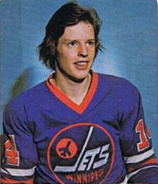
Ulf Nilsson scored 7 goals and recorded 19 assists for 26 total points on his way to being named WHA Playoff MVP.

1975–76 Winnipeg Jets

=== Players ===
Centres

- Mats Lindh
- Veli-Pekka Ketola
- Peter Sullivan
- Ulf Nilsson

Wingers

- Lyle Moffat
- Bob Guindon
- Willy Lindstrom
- Bobby Hull
- Bill Lesuk
- Norm Beaudin
- Anders Hedberg

Defencemen

- Larry Hillman
- Ted Green
- Larry Hornung
- Heikki Riihiranta
- Lars-Erik Sjoberg (Captain)
- Freeman Asmundson
- Thommie Bergman
- Mike Ford

Goaltenders

- Curt Larsson
- Joe Daley

=== Coaching and administrative staff ===
- Bobby Kromm (head coach)
- Rudy Pilous (general manager)
