= 1975–76 Winnipeg Jets season =

NHA hockey team season

1975–76 Winnipeg Jets
- Avco Cup champions
- Division: 1st Canadian
- 1975–76 record: 52–27–2
- Home record: 29–11–0
- Road record: 23–16–2
- Goals for: 345
- Goals against: 254

Team information
- General manager: Rudy Pilous
- Coach: Bobby Kromm
- Captain: Lars-Erik Sjoberg
- Alternate captains: Norm Beaudin; Larry Hornung
- Arena: Winnipeg Arena

Team leaders
- Goals: Bobby Hull (53)
- Assists: Ulf Nilsson (76)
- Points: Bobby Hull (123)
- Penalty minutes: Thommie Bergman (111)
- Wins: Joe Daley (41)
- Goals against average: Joe Daley (2.84)

The 1975–76 Winnipeg Jets season was the Jets' fourth season of operation in the World Hockey Association (WHA). After qualifying first in the Canadian Division, the Jets then proceeded to win three rounds of the playoffs to win their first Avco Cup, sweeping the Houston Aeros 4–0 in the final.

== Regular season ==
=== Final standings ===
Canadian Division	GP	W	L	T	Pts	GF	GA	PIM
Winnipeg Jets	81	52	27	2	106	345	254	940
Quebec Nordiques	81	50	27	4	104	371	316	1654
Calgary Cowboys	80	41	35	4	86	307	282	1064
Edmonton Oilers	81	27	49	5	59	268	345	991
Toronto Toros	81	24	52	5	53	335	398	1099
Denver Spurs / Ottawa Civics+	41	14	26	1	29	134	172	536

+team started season in Western Division when playing in Denver; transferred by league to Canadian Division shortly after moving to Ottawa.

== Schedule and results ==
1975–76 regular season
October: 7–2–0, 14 points (home: 4–0–0; road: 3–2–0)

Game	Result	Date	Score	Opponent	Record
1	W	October 9, 1975	5–3	@ Quebec Nordiques (1975–76)	1–0–0
2	W	October 12, 1975	4–0	@ Phoenix Roadrunners (1975–76)	2–0–0
3	W	October 16, 1975	7–3	@ Denver Spurs/Ottawa Civics (1975–76)	3–0–0
4	L	October 18, 1975	1–2	@ San Diego Mariners (1975–76)	3–1–0
5	L	October 19, 1975	5–6	@ Phoenix Roadrunners (1975–76)	3–2–0
6	W	October 21, 1975	7–0	Cincinnati Stingers (1975–76)	4–2–0
7	W	October 24, 1975	5–2	Denver Spurs/Ottawa Civics (1975–76)	5–2–0
8	W	October 26, 1975	5–0	Phoenix Roadrunners (1975–76)	6–2–0
9	W	October 30, 1975	4–0	Cincinnati Stingers (1975–76)	7–2–0

November: 10–5–0, 20 points (home: 5–3–0; road: 5–2–0)

Game	Result	Date	Score	Opponent	Record
10	L	November 2, 1975	0–1	Quebec Nordiques (1975–76)	7–3–0
11	W	November 4, 1975	3–2 OT	New England Whalers (1975–76)	8–3–0
12	W	November 9, 1975	5–3	Toronto Toros (1975–76)	9–3–0
13	L	November 11, 1975	2–3	Cleveland Crusaders (1975–76)	9–4–0
14	W	November 13, 1975	4–2	@ Calgary Cowboys (1975–76)	10–4–0
15	W	November 14, 1975	6–1	Edmonton Oilers (1975–76)	11–4–0
16	W	November 16, 1975	2–1	Indianapolis Racers (1975–76)	12–4–0
17	L	November 18, 1975	2–3	Houston Aeros (1975–76)	12–5–0
18	W	November 20, 1975	3–2 OT	@ Quebec Nordiques (1975–76)	13–5–0
19	L	November 22, 1975	3–6	@ Cleveland Crusaders (1975–76)	13–6–0
20	W	November 23, 1975	3–2	@ New England Whalers (1975–76)	14–6–0
21	W	November 26, 1975	11–3	@ Cincinnati Stingers (1975–76)	15–6–0
22	L	November 27, 1975	1–3	@ Indianapolis Racers (1975–76)	15–7–0
23	W	November 28, 1975	5–3	@ Toronto Toros (1975–76)	16–7–0
24	W	November 30, 1975	5–3	Minnesota Fighting Saints (1975–76)	17–7–0

December: 8–7–0, 16 points (home: 2–3–0; road: 6–4–0)

Game	Result	Date	Score	Opponent	Record
25	W	December 2, 1975	4–3 OT	@ Denver Spurs/Ottawa Civics (1975–76)	18–7–0
26	W	December 4, 1975	5–4	@ San Diego Mariners (1975–76)	19–7–0
27	L	December 5, 1975	4–5	@ Houston Aeros (1975–76)	19–8–0
28	L	December 7, 1975	2–3	Quebec Nordiques (1975–76)	19–9–0
29	W	December 10, 1975	6–5 OT	Toronto Toros (1975–76)	20–9–0
30	W	December 12, 1975	4–2	Calgary Cowboys (1975–76)	21–9–0
31	W	December 14, 1975	3–1	@ Edmonton Oilers (1975–76)	22–9–0
32	W	December 16, 1975	4–3	@ Toronto Toros (1975–76)	23–9–0
33	L	December 18, 1975	4–5	@ Quebec Nordiques (1975–76)	23–10–0
34	L	December 20, 1975	3–6	@ Minnesota Fighting Saints (1975–76)	23–11–0
35	L	December 21, 1975	1–3	Minnesota Fighting Saints (1975–76)	23–12–0
36	W	December 23, 1975	6–2	@ Edmonton Oilers (1975–76)	24–12–0
37	L	December 26, 1975	4–5	Calgary Cowboys (1975–76)	24–13–0
38	L	December 28, 1975	4–6	@ Calgary Cowboys (1975–76)	24–14–0
39	W	December 30, 1975	5–3	@ Houston Aeros (1975–76)	25–14–0

January: 10–4–0, 20 points (home: 6–2–0; road: 4–2–0)

Game	Result	Date	Score	Opponent	Record
40	W	January 3, 1976	6–3	@ Calgary Cowboys (1975–76)	26–14–0
41	W	January 4, 1976	8–1	@ Edmonton Oilers (1975–76)	27–14–0
42	L	January 6, 1976	0–5	@ Calgary Cowboys (1975–76)	27–15–0
43	W	January 7, 1976	8–2	Toronto Toros (1975–76)	28–15–0
44	L	January 9, 1976	1–2 OT	Indianapolis Racers (1975–76)	28–16–0
45	W	January 11, 1976	6–5 OT	Denver Spurs/Ottawa Civics (1975–76)	29–16–0
46	W	January 14, 1976	4–1	Houston Aeros (1975–76)	30–16–0
47	L	January 16, 1976	1–5	Edmonton Oilers (1975–76)	30–17–0
48	W	January 18, 1976	8–0	New England Whalers (1975–76)	31–17–0
49	W	January 21, 1976	4–1	Calgary Cowboys (1975–76)	32–17–0
50	W	January 23, 1976	4–2	Edmonton Oilers (1975–76)	33–17–0
51	L	January 28, 1976	2–6	@ Minnesota Fighting Saints (1975–76)	33–18–0
52	W	January 30, 1976	6–3	@ New England Whalers (1975–76)	34–18–0
53	W	January 31, 1976	5–2	@ Cincinnati Stingers (1975–76)	35–18–0

February: 9–3–2, 20 points (home: 6–1–0; road: 3–2–2)

Game	Result	Date	Score	Opponent	Record
54	W	February 1, 1976	2–1	@ Indianapolis Racers (1975–76)	36–18–0
55	L	February 3, 1976	4–5	@ Quebec Nordiques (1975–76)	36–19–0
56	W	February 6, 1976	7–6	@ Toronto Toros (1975–76)	37–19–0
57	T	February 7, 1976	4–4	@ Cleveland Crusaders (1975–76)	37–19–1
58	W	February 8, 1976	8–4	Calgary Cowboys (1975–76)	38–19–1
59	L	February 11, 1976	4–6	Quebec Nordiques (1975–76)	38–20–1
60	W	February 15, 1976	7–6	Toronto Toros (1975–76)	39–20–1
61	T	February 17, 1976	4–4	@ Edmonton Oilers (1975–76)	39–20–2
62	W	February 18, 1976	4–3	Phoenix Roadrunners (1975–76)	40–20–2
63	W	February 20, 1976	4–2	Edmonton Oilers (1975–76)	41–20–2
64	W	February 25, 1976	5–2	Cleveland Crusaders (1975–76)	42–20–2
65	W	February 27, 1976	4–3	Edmonton Oilers (1975–76)	43–20–2
66	W	February 28, 1976	4–3 OT	@ Quebec Nordiques (1975–76)	44–20–2
67	L	February 29, 1976	7–11	@ Toronto Toros (1975–76)	44–21–2

March: 7–4–0, 14 points (home: 6–2–0; road: 1–2–0)

Game	Result	Date	Score	Opponent	Record
68	W	March 7, 1976	3–1	Calgary Cowboys (1975–76)	45–21–2
69	W	March 9, 1976	5–2	@ Toronto Toros (1975–76)	46–21–2
70	W	March 10, 1976	10–3	Quebec Nordiques (1975–76)	47–21–2
71	L	March 12, 1976	8–10	Quebec Nordiques (1975–76)	47–22–2
72	W	March 14, 1976	4–2	Edmonton Oilers (1975–76)	48–22–2
73	W	March 17, 1976	3–2	Calgary Cowboys (1975–76)	49–22–2
74	L	March 19, 1976	1–2	@ Edmonton Oilers (1975–76)	49–23–2
75	L	March 21, 1976	2–5	@ Toronto Toros (1975–76)	49–24–2
76	L	March 24, 1976	2–3	Edmonton Oilers (1975–76)	49–25–2
77	W	March 28, 1976	6–1	San Diego Mariners (1975–76)	50–25–2
78	W	March 31, 1976	5–3	Toronto Toros (1975–76)	51–25–2

April: 1–2–0, 2 points (home: 0–0–0; road: 1–2–0)

Game	Result	Date	Score	Opponent	Record
79	L	April 2, 1976	1–4	@ Calgary Cowboys (1975–76)	51–26–2
80	L	April 4, 1976	2–5	@ Edmonton Oilers (1975–76)	51–27–2
81	W	April 6, 1976	5–3	@ Calgary Cowboys (1975–76)	52–27–2

Legend: Win (2 points) Loss (0 points) Tie (1 point)

== Playoffs ==
1976 Avco Cup playoffs
Quarterfinals vs. (C4) Edmonton Oilers – Jets win 4–0

Game	Date	Visitor	Score	Home	Series
1	April 9	Edmonton Oilers	3–7	Winnipeg Jets	1–0
2	April 11	Edmonton Oilers	4–5 OT	Winnipeg Jets	2–0
3	April 14	Winnipeg Jets	3–2	Edmonton Oilers	3–0
4	April 16	Winnipeg Jets	7–2	Edmonton Oilers	4–0

Semifinals vs. (C3) Calgary Cowboys – Jets win 4–1

Game	Date	Visitor	Score	Home	Series
1	April 23	Calgary Cowboys	1–6	Winnipeg Jets	1–0
2	April 25	Calgary Cowboys	2–3	Winnipeg Jets	2–0
3	April 28	Winnipeg Jets	6–3	Calgary Cowboys	3–0
4	April 30	Winnipeg Jets	3–7	Calgary Cowboys	3–1
5	May 2	Calgary Cowboys	0–4	Winnipeg Jets	4–1

Avco Cup Finals vs. (W1) Houston Aeros – Jets win 4–0

Game	Date	Visitor	Score	Home	Series
1	May 20	Winnipeg Jets	4–3	Houston Aeros	1–0
2	May 23	Winnipeg Jets	5–4	Houston Aeros	2–0
3	May 25	Houston Aeros	3–6	Winnipeg Jets	3–0
4	May 27	Houston Aeros	1–9	Winnipeg Jets	4–0

Legend: Win Loss

== Player statistics ==
=== Regular season ===
Scoring

Regular season
Player	Pos	GP	G	A	Pts	PIM	+/-	PPG	SHG	GWG
Bobby Hull	LW	80	53	70	123	30	62	14	0	10
Ulf Nilsson	C	78	38	76	114	84	65	7	3	8
Anders Hedberg	RW	76	50	55	105	48	60	9	6	10
Peter Sullivan	C	78	32	39	71	22	−4	5	0	3
Veli-Pekka Ketola	C	80	32	36	68	32	−4	8	0	1
Willy Lindstrom	RW	81	23	36	59	32	4	5	1	4
Mike Ford	D	81	13	43	56	70	39	2	0	2
Norm Beaudin	RW	80	16	31	47	38	−1	2	0	1
Thommie Bergman	D	81	11	30	41	111	9	1	0	2
Lars-Erik Sjoberg	D	81	5	36	41	12	46	1	0	0
Bill Lesuk	LW	81	15	21	36	92	1	3	0	2
Mats Lindh	C	65	19	15	34	12	7	4	0	5
Ted Green	D	79	5	23	28	73	32	0	0	0
Lyle Moffat	LW	42	13	9	22	44	3	4	0	2
Larry Hornung	D	76	3	18	21	26	−6	1	0	2
Freeman Asmundson	D/RW	72	5	11	16	19	1	0	0	0
Perry Miller	D	47	7	6	13	41	8	1	0	0
Larry Hillman	D	71	1	12	13	62	−3	0	0	0
Heikki Riihiranta	D	70	1	8	9	26	0	0	0	0
Bobby Guindon	LW	29	3	3	6	14	−7	1	0	0
Joe Daley	G	62	0	1	1	17	0	0	0	0
Curt Larsson	G	23	0	1	1	6	0	0	0	0
Gerry Odrowski	D	13	0	1	1	6	−8	0	0	0
Randy Legge	D	1	0	0	0	0	1	0	0	0

Goaltending

Player	MIN	GP	W	L	T	GA	GAA	SO
Joe Daley	3612	62	41	17	1	171	2.84	5
Curt Larsson	1287	23	11	10	1	83	3.87	0
Team:	4899	81	52	27	2	254	3.11	5

=== Playoffs ===
Scoring

Player	Pos	GP	G	A	Pts	PIM
Ulf Nilsson	C	13	7	19	26	6
Bobby Hull	LW	13	12	8	20	4
Anders Hedberg	RW	13	13	6	19	15
Peter Sullivan	C	13	6	7	13	0
Thommie Bergman	D	13	3	10	13	8
Mike Ford	D	12	1	12	13	8
Veli-Pekka Ketola	C	13	7	5	12	2
Willy Lindstrom	RW	13	4	7	11	2
Bobby Guindon	LW	13	3	3	6	9
Lyle Moffat	LW	13	3	3	6	9
Freeman Asmundson	D/RW	13	3	2	5	11
Norm Beaudin	RW	13	2	3	5	10
Lars-Erik Sjoberg	D	13	0	5	5	12
Bill Lesuk	LW	13	2	2	4	8
Mats Lindh	C	13	2	2	4	4
Heikki Riihiranta	D	4	0	4	4	6
Larry Hornung	D	13	0	3	3	6
Ted Green	D	11	0	2	2	16
Larry Hillman	D	12	0	2	2	32
Joe Daley	G	12	0	1	1	10
Curt Larsson	G	2	0	0	0	2

Goaltending

Player	MIN	GP	W	L	GA	GAA	SO
Joe Daley	671	12	10	1	29	2.59	1
Curt Larsson	110	2	2	0	6	3.27	0
Team:	781	13	12	1	35	2.69	1

Note:

Pos = Position;GP = Games played; G = Goals; A = Assists; Pts = Points; PIM = Penalty minutes; +/- = Plus/minus; PPG = Power-play goals; SHG = Short-handed goals; GWG = Game-winning goals
Pos = Position;GP = Games played; Min, TOI = Minutes played; W = Wins; L = Losses; T,T/OT = Ties; OTL = Overtime losses; GA = Goals-against; GAA = Goals-against average; SO = Shutouts; SA = Shots against; SV = Shots saved;SV% = Save percentage;

== Draft picks ==
Winnipeg's draft picks at the 1975 WHA Amateur Draft.

Round	#	Player	Nationality	College/Junior/Club team (League)
1	8	Brad Gassoff (LW)	Canada	Kamloops Chiefs (WCHL)
2	22	Russ Anderson (D)	United States	University of Minnesota (WCHA)
3	38	Glen Richardson (LW)	Canada	Hamilton Fincups (OHA)
4	53	Ted Long (LW)	Canada	Hamilton Fincups (OHA)
6	81	Nick Bobstock	Canada	Acadia University
9	119	Jim Gustafson (LW)	Canada	Victoria Cougars (WCHL)
10	132	Dag Bredberg (F)	Sweden	Farjestads BK (Sweden)
11	145	Emil Meszaros (F)	Sweden	Vastra Frolunda (Sweden)
12	156	Torbjorn Nilsson (F)	Sweden	Skelleftea AIK (Sweden)
13	166	Bengt Lundholm (F)	Sweden	AIK IF (Sweden)

== See also ==
- 1975–76 WHA season
