= Houston Aeros =

Houston Aeros may refer to:

- Houston Aeros (WHA), a World Hockey Association team in the 1970s
- Houston Aeros (1994–2013), a team in the International Hockey League and the American Hockey League
