= WHA Playoff MVP =

The Playoff MVP award for the World Hockey Association was handed out annually from 1975 to 1979 to the most valuable player of the playoffs. Ron Grahame won the first award on May 12, 1975. Apparently, the award was originally named after Gordie Howe.

== Winners ==
- 1975 – Ron Grahame, Houston Aeros
- 1976 – Ulf Nilsson, Winnipeg Jets
- 1977 – Serge Bernier, Quebec Nordiques
- 1978 – Robert Guindon, Winnipeg Jets
- 1979 – Rich Preston, Winnipeg Jets

== See also ==
- Conn Smythe Trophy
