= Liam Lindström =

Swedish-Canadian ice hockey player

Liam Lindstrom (born January 12, 1985) is a Canadian-born Swedish ice hockey player, who grew up mainly in Sweden. He was drafted by the Phoenix Coyotes in the 2003 draft. His last North American team was the Phoenix RoadRunners of the ECHL.

Born in Edmonton, Alberta, Lindstrom is the son of former Edmonton Oiler Willy Lindström.

== Career statistics ==
=== Regular season and playoffs ===
| | | | Regular season | | | | | Playoffs |
| Season | Team | League | GP | G | A | Pts | PIM | GP | G | A | Pts | PIM |
|---|---|---|---|---|---|---|---|---|---|---|---|---|
| 2000–01 | Mora IK | J18 Allsv | 14 | 3 | 4 | 7 | 14 | 1 | 0 | 0 | 0 | 0 |
| 2000–01 | Mora IK | J20 | 1 | 0 | 0 | 0 | 2 | — | — | — | — | — |
| 2001–02 | Mora IK | J18 Allsv | 2 | 3 | 0 | 3 | 0 | 1 | 1 | 0 | 1 | 0 |
| 2001–02 | Mora IK | J20 | 25 | 5 | 8 | 13 | 12 | — | — | — | — | — |
| 2001–02 | Mora IK | Allsv | 1 | 1 | 0 | 1 | 0 | — | — | — | — | — |
| 2002–03 | Mora IK | J18 Allsv | 4 | 3 | 1 | 4 | 8 | — | — | — | — | — |
| 2002–03 | Mora IK | J20 | 20 | 3 | 7 | 10 | 57 | — | — | — | — | — |
| 2002–03 | Mora IK | Allsv | 14 | 0 | 0 | 0 | 0 | — | — | — | — | — |
| 2003–04 | IF Sundsvall Hockey | Allsv | 26 | 0 | 0 | 0 | 0 | 2 | 0 | 0 | 0 | 0 |
| 2004–05 | IF Sundsvall Hockey | Allsv | 43 | 3 | 3 | 6 | 22 | 8 | 2 | 1 | 3 | 8 |
| 2005–06 | Hammarby IF | Allsv | 40 | 3 | 4 | 7 | 40 | 6 | 1 | 0 | 1 | 0 |
| 2006–07 | Phoenix Roadrunners | ECHL | 49 | 1 | 10 | 11 | 34 | — | — | — | — | — |
| 2007–08 | Söderhamn/Ljusne HC | SWE.4 | 21 | 11 | 11 | 22 | 86 | — | — | — | — | — |
| 2008–09 | Valbo HC | SWE.3 | 37 | 13 | 17 | 30 | 43 | 10 | 3 | 6 | 9 | 10 |
| 2009–10 | Valbo HC | SWE.3 | 33 | 22 | 24 | 46 | 88 | 1 | 0 | 0 | 0 | 2 |
| 2010–11 | Valbo HC | SWE.3 | 10 | 1 | 6 | 7 | 19 | — | — | — | — | — |
| 2010–11 | Oppala/IK Sätra | SWE.4 | 12 | 14 | 14 | 28 | 39 | 4 | 1 | 1 | 2 | 4 |
| 2011–12 | Oppala/IK Sätra | SWE.4 | 22 | 21 | 19 | 40 | 45 | 9 | 9 | 8 | 17 | 2 |
| 2012–13 | Söderhamn/Ljusne HC | SWE.4 | 29 | 28 | 24 | 52 | 53 | — | — | — | — | — |
| 2013–14 | Söderhamn/Ljusne HC | SWE.4 | 25 | 14 | 16 | 30 | 70 | — | — | — | — | — |
| 2014–15 | Söderhamn/Ljusne HC | SWE.4 | 23 | 13 | 9 | 22 | 73 | 5 | 1 | 0 | 1 | 2 |
| 2015–16 | Oppala IK | SWE.4 | 17 | 6 | 8 | 14 | 14 | 2 | 1 | 2 | 3 | 0 |
| Allsv totals | | | 124 | 7 | 7 | 14 | 62 | 16 | 3 | 1 | 4 | 8 |
| SWE.3 totals | | | 80 | 36 | 47 | 83 | 150 | 11 | 3 | 6 | 9 | 12 |
| SWE.4 totals | | | 149 | 107 | 101 | 208 | 380 | 20 | 12 | 11 | 23 | 8 |

=== International ===
| Year | Team | Event | GP | G | A | Pts | PIM |
|---|---|---|---|---|---|---|---|
| 2002 | Sweden | U18 | 5 | 1 | 0 | 1 | 4 |
| 2003 | Sweden | WJC18 | 6 | 1 | 3 | 4 | 45 |
| Junior totals | | | 11 | 2 | 3 | 5 | 49 |
