= Ron Grahame =

Canadian ice hockey player

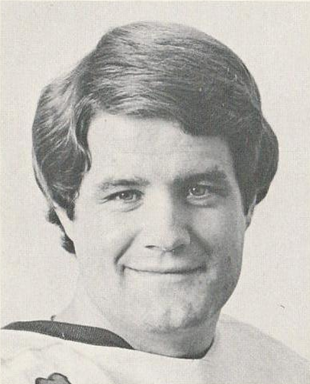
- Grahame in 1975
- Born: June 7, 1950 (age 75) Victoria, British Columbia, Canada
- Height: 5 ft 11 in (180 cm)
- Weight: 175 lb (79 kg; 12 st 7 lb)
- Position: Goaltender
- Caught: Left
- Played for: Houston Aeros; Boston Bruins; Los Angeles Kings; Quebec Nordiques
- NHL draft: Undrafted
- Playing career: 1973–1981

Ronald Ian Grahame (born June 7, 1950) is a Canadian former professional ice hockey goaltender. He played four seasons in the National Hockey League and four in World Hockey Association between 1973 and 1981.

== Playing career ==
After a collegiate career with the University of Denver during which he was named a First Team All-American, Grahame was signed by the Houston Aeros of the WHA. He played a season for the minor league Macon Whoopees in 1973 before coming up to the Aeros at the end of the season. He won in his opening debut with a shutout. In the 1974–75 season he made the Aeros for good, leading the WHA in wins, shutouts and goals against average and backstopping the club to the AVCO World Trophy, winning both the Ben Hatskin Trophy for best goaltender, First Team All-Star accolades and the WHA Playoff MVP. His following two seasons saw an equal degree of success, including a Second Team All-Star berth in 1976 and a second Hatskin award in 1977.

He became a free agent after the 1977 season and signed with the NHL's Boston Bruins for the 1977–78 NHL season. He continued his starring play, having a fine season as the Bruins' number one goaltender. After that season, however, he was traded to the Los Angeles Kings for a first-round draft pick in the 1979 draft (which turned into Ray Bourque), and played poorly thereafter. He served with the Kings for three seasons before being sold to the Quebec Nordiques in December, 1980. He played eight games for the Nordiques before being sent down to the minors for the remainder of the season, after which he retired.

== Post-playing career ==
After retiring, Ron Grahame worked as the athletic director at the University of Denver, where he worked with the hockey team. He also conducted goalie clinics for ice hockey and inline hockey goaltenders

In 2007 Grahame began his second year as Senior Associate Athletics Director, and his 14th year as an administrator at the University of Denver. He was responsible for the overall supervision of all 17 varsity sport programs at Denver.

Grahame graduated from the University of Denver in 1973 with a B.A. in physical education and was one of the most successful hockey players in school history. After retiring from playing, he returned to Denver as an assistant coach from 1982 to 1989.

Ron and his wife Charlotte have two sons, John, an NHL goaltender who won the Stanley Cup in 2004 with the Tampa Bay Lightning, and Jason, who graduated from the University of Denver in 2003 and now lives in Vancouver. Ron and Charlotte reside in Denver. Charlotte and John are the only mother/son combination to have their names engraved on the Stanley Cup (Charlotte was a member of the Colorado Avalanche executive management during their 2001 Stanley Cup season).

== Awards and honours ==
Award	Year
All-WCHA First Team	1972–73
AHCA West All-American	1972–73
World Hockey Association Hall of Fame - Inaugural member	2010

== Career statistics ==
=== Regular season and playoffs ===
			Regular season									Playoffs
Season	Team	League	GP	W	L	T	MIN	GA	SO	GAA	SV%	GP	W	L	MIN	GA	SO	GAA	SV%
1967–68	Victoria Cougars	BCHL	—	—	—	—	—	—	—	—	—	—	—	—	—	—	—	—	—
1968–69	Victoria Cougars	BCHL	23	—	—	—	2380	73	0	3.17	—	—	—	—	—	—	—	—	—
1969–70	University of Denver	WCHA	30	19	10	1	1800	103	1	3.43	.883	—	—	—	—	—	—	—	—
1970–71	University of Denver	WCHA	17	11	7	1	1020	70	1	4.12	—	—	—	—	—	—	—	—	—
1971–72	University of Denver	WCHA	37	26	11	0	2200	132	0	3.60	.894	—	—	—	—	—	—	—	—
1972–73	University of Denver	WCHA	35	26	7	1	2094	102	2	2.92	.921	—	—	—	—	—	—	—	—
1973–74	Houston Aeros	WHA	4	3	0	1	250	5	1	1.20	.959	—	—	—	—	—	—	—	—
1973–74	Macon Whoopees	SHL	46	—	—	—	2588	178	0	4.13	.887	—	—	—	—	—	—	—	—
1974–75	Houston Aeros	WHA	43	33	10	0	2590	131	4	3.03	.900	13	12	1	780	26	3	2.00	.941
1975–76	Houston Aeros	WHA	57	39	17	0	3343	182	3	3.27	.896	14	6	8	817	54	1	3.97	—
1976–77	Houston Aeros	WHA	39	20	17	2	3345	107	4	2.74	.901	9	4	5	561	36	0	3.85	.864
1977–78	Boston Bruins	NHL	40	26	6	7	2328	107	3	2.76	.874	4	2	1	202	7	0	2.08	.894
1978–79	Los Angeles Kings	NHL	34	11	19	2	1935	136	0	4.22	.862	—	—	—	—	—	—	—	—
1979–80	Los Angeles Kings	NHL	26	9	11	4	1406	98	2	4.18	.875	—	—	—	—	—	—	—	—
1980–81	Los Angeles Kings	NHL	6	3	2	1	360	28	0	4.67	.859	—	—	—	—	—	—	—	—
1980–81	Quebec Nordiques	NHL	8	1	5	1	437	40	0	5.49	.832	—	—	—	—	—	—	—	—
1980–81	Binghamton Whalers	AHL	30	12	6	2	1240	72	0	3.48	.878	5	—	—	289	22	0	4.57	—
WHA totals			143	102	37	3	8528	425	12	2.99	.900	36	22	14	2158	116	4	3.23	—
NHL totals			114	50	43	15	6457	409	5	3.80	.866	4	2	1	202	7	0	2.08	.894

== See also ==
- List of family relations in the NHL

Awards and achievements
Preceded by Doug Palazzari	WCHA Most Valuable Player; 1972–73	Succeeded by Doug Palazzari
