= Mike Ford (ice hockey) =

Canadian ice hockey player (born 1952)

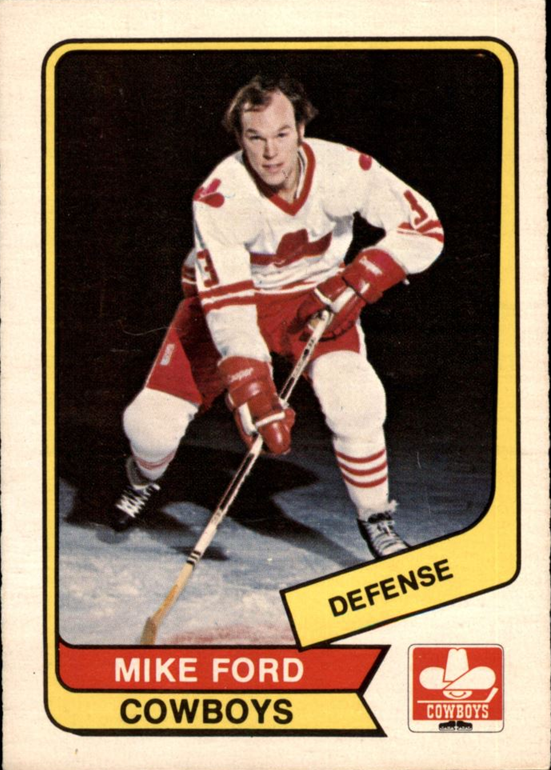
- Born: July 26, 1952 (age 74) Ottawa, Ontario, Canada
- Height: 6 ft 1 in (185 cm)
- Weight: 172 lb (78 kg; 12 st 4 lb)
- Position: Defence
- Shot: Right
- Played for: Winnipeg Jets; Calgary Cowboys
- NHL draft: 122nd overall, 1972; Detroit Red Wings
- Playing career: 1972–1986

Mike Ford (born July 26, 1952) is a Canadian retired professional ice hockey player who played 233 games in the World Hockey Association for the Winnipeg Jets and Calgary Cowboys. A two-time winner of the Avco World Trophy with the Jets (1976, 1978), he recorded 25 assists in the WHA playoffs for a career.

== Career statistics ==
=== Regular season and playoffs ===
			Regular season					Playoffs
Season	Team	League	GP	G	A	Pts	PIM	GP	G	A	Pts	PIM
1970–71	Winnipeg Jets	WCHL	1	1	0	1	0	—	—	—	—	—
1971–72	Winnipeg Jets	WCHL	27	6	12	18	43	—	—	—	—	—
1971–72	Brandon Wheat Kings	WCHL	28	8	17	25	85	—	—	—	—	—
1972–73	Virginia Red Wings	AHL	5	1	3	4	2	—	—	—	—	—
1972–73	Port Huron Wings	IHL	66	3	35	38	195	11	1	5	6	16
1973–74	Port Huron Wings	IHL	72	13	34	47	107	—	—	—	—	—
1974–75	Winnipeg Jets	WHA	73	12	22	34	68	—	—	—	—	—
1975–76	Winnipeg Jets	WHA	81	13	43	56	70	12	1	12	13	8
1976–77	Calgary Cowboys	WHA	54	5	20	25	14	—	—	—	—	—
1976–77	Winnipeg Jets	WHA	22	3	14	17	20	20	3	13	16	12
1977–78	Winnipeg Jets	WHA	3	0	0	0	0	2	1	0	1	0
1977–78	Vastra Frolunda IF	SEL	29	11	10	21	72	—	—	—	—	—
1978–79	Vastra Frolunda IF	SEL	25	11	13	24	64	—	—	—	—	—
1979–80	Duisburg SC	1.GBun	43	21	37	58	107	—	—	—	—	—
1980–81	Cologne EC	1.GBun	39	21	26	47	76	4	2	4	6	10
1981–82	Cologne EC	1.GBun	38	16	32	48	44	1	1	0	1	0
1982–83	Cologne EC	1.GBun	36	9	26	35	32	—	—	—	—	—
1983–84	Freiburg ERC	1.GBun	42	8	30	38	54	—	—	—	—	—
1984–85	Duesseldorf EG	1.GBun	3	0	1	1	0	—	—	—	—	—
1985–86	Freiburg EHC	2.GBun	9	3	4	7	20	—	—	—	—	—
WHA totals			233	33	99	132	172	34	5	25	30	20
