= Rich Preston =

Canadian ice hockey player and coach

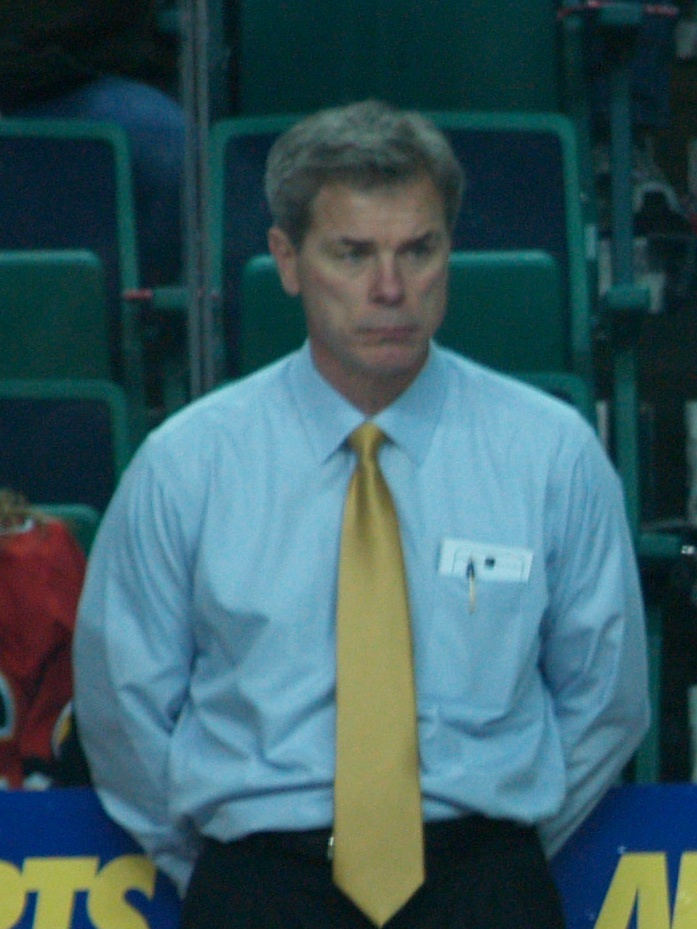
- Preston watching a Flames pre-game skate
- Born: May 22, 1952 (age 73) Regina, Saskatchewan, Canada
- Height: 6 ft 0 in (183 cm)
- Weight: 185 lb (84 kg; 13 st 3 lb)
- Position: Right wing
- Shot: Right
- Played for: Houston Aeros (WHA); Winnipeg Jets (WHA); Chicago Black Hawks; New Jersey Devils
- NHL draft: Undrafted
- Playing career: 1974–1987

Richard John "Rich" Preston (born May 22, 1952) is a Canadian ice hockey coach and former forward. He played hockey for the Houston Aeros and Winnipeg Jets of the World Hockey Association and the Chicago Black Hawks of the National Hockey League. He won the Avco World Trophy in 1975 with Houston and 1979 with Winnipeg, and his play in the 1979 WHA playoffs awarded him the WHA Playoff MVP, the last to be awarded by the league prior to the NHL-WHA merger.

== Early life ==
Preston was born in Regina, Saskatchewan. He is the son of Ken Preston, general manager of the Saskatchewan Roughriders from 1958 to 1977 and a member of the Canadian Football Hall of Fame. He studied and played with the Denver Pioneers.

== Playing career ==
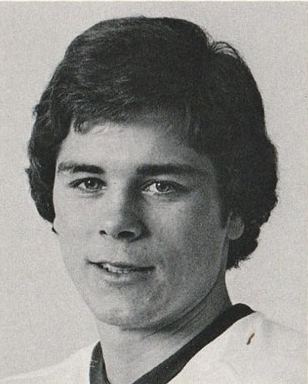
1975-76 card of Preston

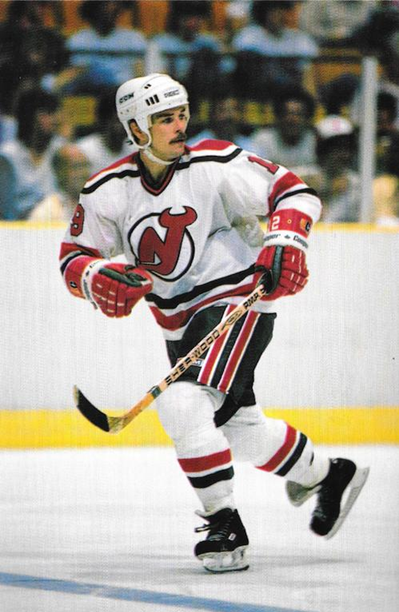
1984 postcard of Preston for New Jersey Devils

His play with teammate Rob Palmer, who was drafted by the Chicago Black Hawks, had attracted them to put him on a negotiation list to maybe consider him. He mulled it over but when Bill Dineen of the upstart Houston Aeros (which had players such as Gordie Howe) inquired about his services, Preston went with Houston, which gave him $30,000 for his first season with a $25,000 signing bonus.

Preston began his professional career in the World Hockey Association in the 1974–75 season with the Avco World Trophy champion Houston Aeros At one point, he played on the same line of Gordie Howe and Mark Howe that saw Preston play right wing that had teammates jokingly dub them "Howe, Howe and Who!"

He then played three more years with the Aeros before the team folded. Preston, along with several players, was sold to the Winnipeg Jets before the start of the 1978–79 season. The Jets won the Avco World Trophy in 1979 (the league's final year) and Preston was named Most Valuable Player of the WHA playoffs.

Preston started his National Hockey League career with the Chicago Black Hawks in 1980. He also played for the New Jersey Devils. He left the NHL after the 1987 season.

== Post career ==
Preston was an assistant coach for the Calgary Flames from the 2003-2004 NHL season until just after the 2008-2009 NHL season. Shortly after his dismissal from the Flames, Preston was hired as the WHL's Lethbridge Hurricanes head coach and general manager. After four years in Lethbridge without a single playoff game, Preston was fired from both roles before any team advanced past the first round of the 2013 WHL playoffs.

He is currently serving as a scout for the Anaheim Ducks.

== Career statistics ==
			Regular season					Playoffs
Season	Team	League	GP	G	A	Pts	PIM	GP	G	A	Pts	PIM
1969–70	Regina Pats	SJHL	36	15	15	30	4	—	—	—	—	—
1970–71	University of Denver	WCHA	17	0	1	1	0	—	—	—	—	—
1971–72	University of Denver	WCHA	33	3	11	14	18	—	—	—	—	—
1972–73	University of Denver	WCHA	39	23	25	48	24	—	—	—	—	—
1973–74	University of Denver	WCHA	38	20	25	45	36	—	—	—	—	—
1974–75	Houston Aeros	WHA	78	20	21	41	10	13	1	6	7	6
1975–76	Houston Aeros	WHA	77	22	33	55	33	17	4	6	10	8
1976–77	Houston Aeros	WHA	80	38	41	79	54	11	3	5	8	10
1977–78	Houston Aeros	WHA	73	25	25	50	52	—	—	—	—	—
1978–79	Winnipeg Jets	WHA	80	28	32	60	88	10	8	5	13	15
1979–80	Chicago Black Hawks	NHL	80	31	30	61	70	7	0	3	3	2
1980–81	Chicago Black Hawks	NHL	47	7	14	21	24	3	0	1	1	0
1981–82	Chicago Black Hawks	NHL	75	15	28	43	30	15	2	4	6	21
1982–83	Chicago Black Hawks	NHL	79	25	28	53	64	13	2	7	9	25
1983–84	Chicago Black Hawks	NHL	75	10	18	28	50	5	0	1	1	4
1984–85	New Jersey Devils	NHL	75	12	15	27	26	—	—	—	—	—
1985–86	New Jersey Devils	NHL	76	19	22	41	65	—	—	—	—	—
1986–87	Chicago Blackhawks	NHL	73	8	9	17	19	4	0	2	2	4
NHL totals			580	127	164	291	348	47	4	18	22	56
WHA totals			388	133	152	285	237	51	16	22	38	39
