= Ulf Nilsson (ice hockey) =

Swedish ice hockey player (born 1950)

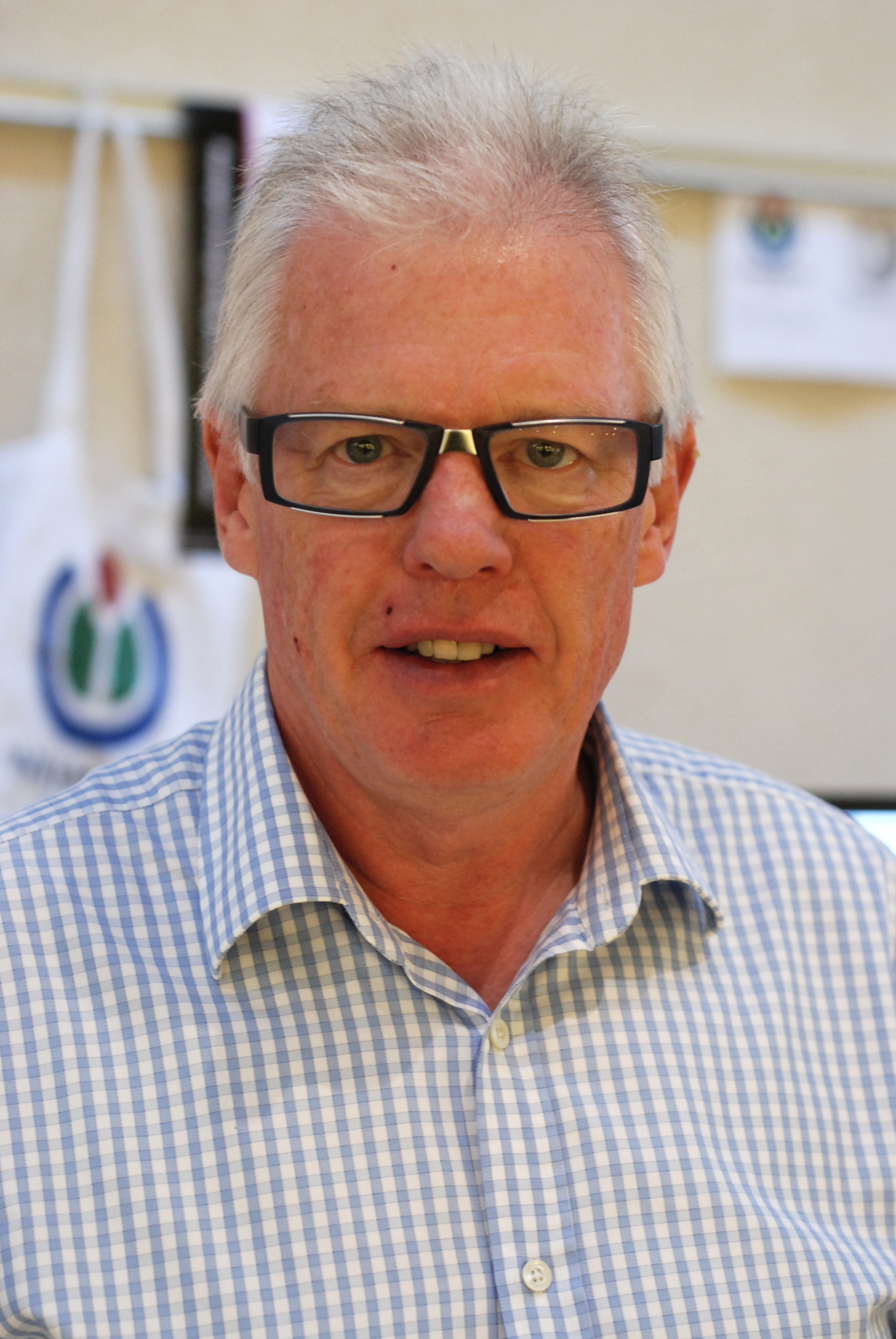
- Ulf Nilsson during the Internet Days in Stockholm, Sweden, in October 2008
- Born: 11 May 1950 (age 76) Nynäshamn, Sweden
- Height: 5 ft 11 in (180 cm)
- Weight: 175 lb (79 kg; 12 st 7 lb)
- Position: Centre
- Shot: Right
- Played for: AIK IF; Winnipeg Jets; New York Rangers
- National team: Sweden
- NHL draft: Undrafted
- Playing career: 1967–1983
Medal record
Representing Sweden
Men's ice hockey
World Championships
Silver medal – second place	1973 Soviet Union
Bronze medal – third place	1974 Finland

Ulf Gösta Nilsson (born 11 May 1950) is a Swedish former professional ice hockey player who played in the World Hockey Association (WHA) for the Winnipeg Jets and in the National Hockey League (NHL) for the New York Rangers. As part of "The Hot Line" with teammates Bobby Hull and Anders Hedberg that played from 1974 to 1978, Nilsson won two Avco World Trophies as WHA champions with the Winnipeg Jets. He recorded 67 points, including 14 goals, in 42 playoff games for an average of 1.595 points per game, the best playoff point average for all WHA players.

== Career in North America ==
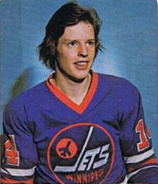
Nisson for the Winnipeg Jets in 1975.

In the early 1970s Nilsson was part of a group of hockey players who was tested on by Jerry Wilson, a Canadian former hockey player who was studying the physiology of hockey players, specifically their heart and lung conditioning. Wilson had been asked by the Winnipeg Jets of the World Hockey Association (WHA) to watch out for any notable Swedish hockey players, and he recommended both Nilsson and Anders Hedberg, who was one of Wilson's interns. Both would join the Jets in 1974. At the time the Buffalo Sabres of the National Hockey League owned Nilsson's NHL rights, but by going to the WHA there was no compensation required.

Part of the first major wave of Europeans to star in North American hockey, Nilsson was a major star in the World Hockey Association from 1974 to 1978. He scored at least 114 points in each of his four seasons in the upstart league, finishing third or fourth among overall scorers every time. He led the WHA with 85 assists in 1976–77, and tied Marc Tardif for the lead the next season with 89. Along with countryman Anders Hedberg and established superstar Bobby Hull, he played a starring role as the Jets won Avco Cup titles in 1976 and 1978. In the 1976 playoffs, he scored 26 points in 13 games and was named WHA Playoff MVP.

By this time both Hedberg and Nilsson were looking to join the NHL, as they had nothing left to prove in the WHA. They were also looking for a massive increase in salary: both had earned around $125,000 in the 1976–77 season. With their high salary demands, the only NHL team capable of signing them was the New York Rangers. While the Jets stated they wanted to re-sign both players, the team did not have the financial backing to do so.

In the summer of 1978, Nilsson and Hedberg signed with the Rangers. Each signed contracts $600,000 per season for two years. Their signings further weakened the struggling WHA which would cease operations after just one more season. Nilsson's NHL career was marred by two significant injuries. The first was a broken ankle suffered when his skate blade got caught in a crevice in the Madison Square Garden ice as he was hit by Denis Potvin of the New York Islanders, which resulted in Nilsson bearing the entire force of the hit on only one leg. Although Nilsson has never characterized the hit as dirty and, in 2009, said, "He [Potvin] was always fair. But the ice was never great in the Garden, because they had basketball and other events. My foot got caught. It was a freak thing," the incident is nevertheless commemorated by the "Potvin Sucks" chant that takes place during every Rangers home game.

As a player of NHL All-Stars team, Nilsson took part in the 1979 Challenge Cup, where they played against the Soviet Union national team.

Nilsson's second serious injury was to his knee while representing Sweden at the 1981 Canada Cup which caused him to miss the entire 1981–82 season. Nilsson was limited to 160 games in his three full seasons with the Rangers, though he scored an impressive 163 points in that time. He scored 8 goals and 16 points in the 1980–81 playoffs as the Rangers advanced to the semi-finals before being eliminated by their local rivals, the defending champion Islanders. After missing the previous season, he returned to the Rangers lineup for ten games early in the 1982–83 season.

== Use of banned substances ==
Nilsson tested positive for ephedrine after Sweden's 4–1 victory over Poland on 6 April 1974, at the 1974 World Ice Hockey Championships. As a result, Sweden's win was vacated, and Poland was awarded a 5–0 walkover win. Nilsson was suspended for the remainder of the tournament.

== Post-playing career ==
Nilsson was one of five plaintiffs along with Dave Forbes, Rick Middleton, Brad Park and Doug Smail in Forbes v. Eagleson, a class action lawsuit filed in 1995 on behalf of about 1,000 NHL players who were employed by NHL teams between 1972 and 1991 against Alan Eagleson, the league and its member clubs. The players alleged that the NHL and its teams violated the Racketeer Influenced and Corrupt Organizations (RICO) Act by colluding with Eagleson to enable him to embezzle from the National Hockey League Players' Association (NHLPA) and that the four-year statute of limitations in civil racketeering cases began when Eagleson was indicted in 1994. The lawsuit was dismissed on August 27, 1998 in United States District Court for the Eastern District of Pennsylvania by Thomas Newman O'Neill Jr. who ruled that the statute of limitations expired because it had begun in 1991 when the players were made aware of the allegations against Eagleson. O'Neill's decision was upheld in the United States Court of Appeals for the Third Circuit on 17 October 2000.

== Awards and achievements ==
- World Championship silver medalist (1973)
- World Championship bronze medalist (1974)
- WHA First All-Star Team (1976 and 1978)
- Playoff MVP (WHA) (1976)
- WHA Second All-Star Team (1977)
- Avco Cup (WHA Championship) (1976 and 1978)
- WHA all-time leader in career assists per game (1.15)
- Viking Award (best Swedish hockey player playing in North America) 1978
- Played in the Canada Cup (1976 and 1981)
- Played in the Challenge Cup (1979)
- New York Rangers Players' Player Award (1979)
- Honoured Member of the Manitoba Hockey Hall of Fame
- Inaugural member of the World Hockey Association Hall of Fame.

== Career statistics ==
=== Regular season and playoffs ===
			Regular season					Playoffs
Season	Team	League	GP	G	A	Pts	PIM	GP	G	A	Pts	PIM
1967–68	AIK	SWE	19	2	1	3	—	—	—	—	—	—
1968–69	AIK	SWE	8	2	4	6	0	7	1	3	4	4
1969–70	AIK	SWE	14	6	6	12	10	14	5	3	8	2
1970–71	AIK	SWE	14	10	3	13	6	14	2	4	6	8
1971–72	AIK	SWE	14	5	6	11	2	8	5	1	6	2
1972–73	AIK	SWE	14	11	7	18	4	14	10	8	18	23
1973–74	AIK	SWE	14	9	9	18	32	15	14	6	20	26
1974–75	Winnipeg Jets	WHA	78	26	94	120	79	—	—	—	—	—
1975–76	Winnipeg Jets	WHA	78	38	76	114	84	13	7	19	26	6
1976–77	Winnipeg Jets	WHA	71	39	85	124	89	20	6	21	27	33
1977–78	Winnipeg Jets	WHA	73	37	89	126	89	9	1	13	14	12
1978–79	New York Rangers	NHL	59	27	39	66	21	2	0	0	0	2
1979–80	New York Rangers	NHL	50	14	44	58	20	9	0	6	6	2
1980–81	New York Rangers	NHL	51	14	25	39	42	14	8	8	16	23
1981–82	Springfield Indians	AHL	2	0	0	0	0	—	—	—	—	—
1982–83	New York Rangers	NHL	10	2	4	6	2	—	—	—	—	—
1982–83	Tulsa Oilers	CHL	3	2	1	3	4	—	—	—	—	—
NHL totals			170	57	112	169	85	25	8	14	22	27
SWE totals			97	45	36	81	54	72	37	25	62	65
WHA totals			300	140	344	484	341	42	14	53	67	51

=== International ===
Year	Team	Comp	GP	G	A	Pts	PIM
1973	Sweden	WC	10	5	3	8	4
1974	Sweden	WC	2	0	0	0	0
1976	Sweden	CC	5	1	1	2	6
1981	Sweden	CC	4	1	2	3	2
Senior totals			21	7	6	13	12

== See also ==
- Islanders–Rangers rivalry
