= Anders Hedberg =

Swedish ice hockey player (born 1951)

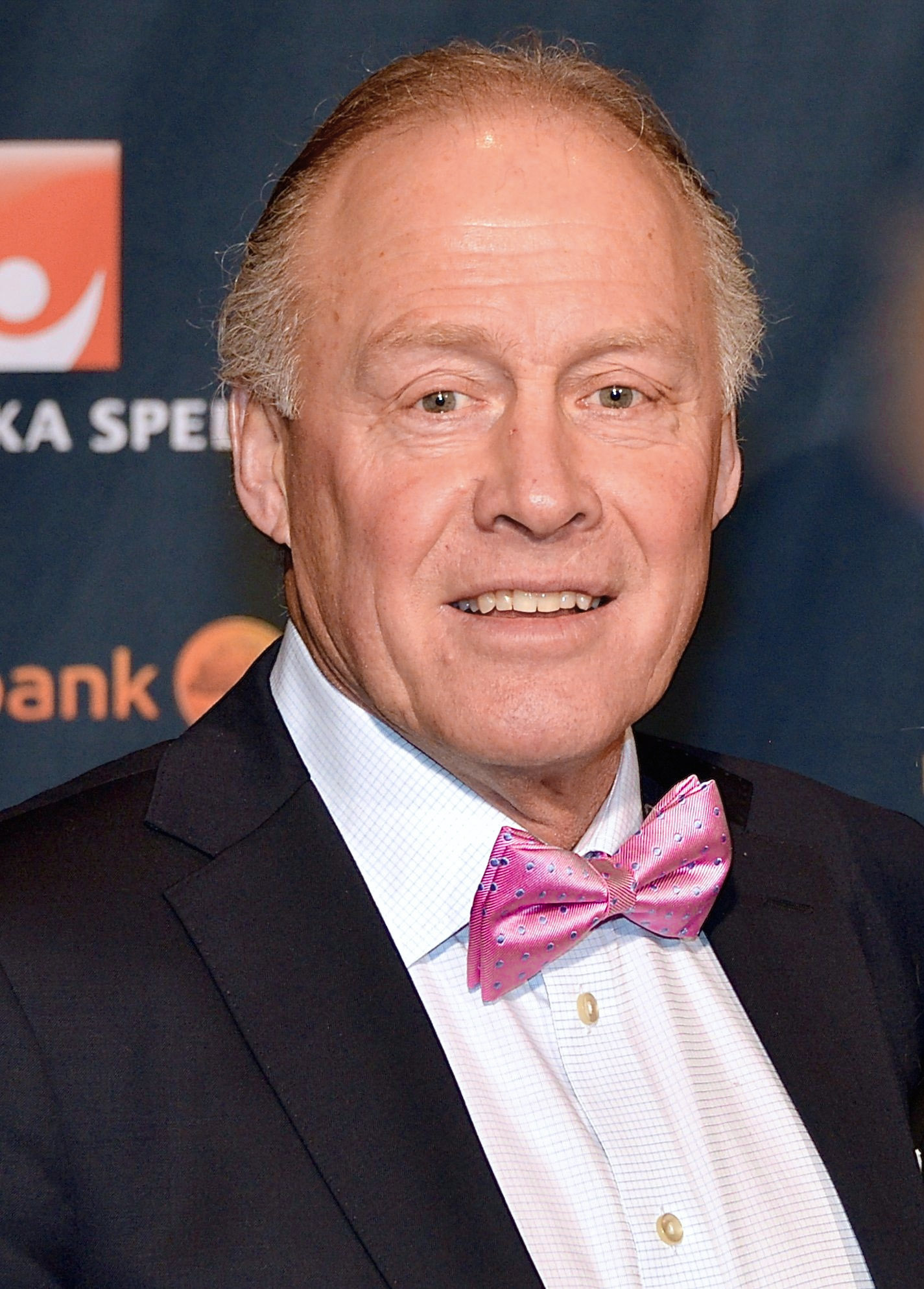
- Hedberg in January 2013
- Born: 25 February 1951 (age 75) Örnsköldsvik, Sweden
- Height: 5 ft 11 in (180 cm)
- Weight: 175 lb (79 kg; 12 st 7 lb)
- Position: Right wing
- Shot: Left
- Played for: Modo AIK; Djurgårdens IF; Winnipeg Jets; New York Rangers
- National team: Sweden
- NHL draft: Undrafted
- Playing career: 1967–1985
Medal record
Representing Sweden
Men's ice hockey
European Junior Championships
Bronze medal – third place	1968 Finland
Bronze medal – third place	1970 Switzerland
World Championships
Silver medal – second place	1970 Sweden
Bronze medal – third place	1972 Czechoslovakia
Bronze medal – third place	1973 Soviet Union
Bronze medal – third place	1974 Finland

Anders Hedberg (born 25 February 1951) is a Swedish former professional ice hockey player who was one of the first European-born players to make an impact in North America. He played internationally for the Sweden men's national ice hockey team, and was inducted into the IIHF Hall of Fame in 1997. Along with countryman Ulf Nilsson, Hedberg signed a contract to play for the Winnipeg Jets in the World Hockey Association (WHA) in 1974, after having represented both Modo Hockey and Djurgårdens IF in his native Sweden. Hedberg subsequently played during seven seasons in the National Hockey League (NHL) for the New York Rangers. He was twice voted best junior in Sweden (1969 and 1970) and is a graduate from the Stockholm School of Physical Education (GIH). As part of the "Hot Line" with teammates Bobby Hull and Ulf Nilsson that played from 1974 to 1978, Hedberg won two Avco World Trophies as WHA champions with the Winnipeg Jets. In 1977, he became the first player to score more than 50 goals in the first 50 games in a season, doing so with 51 goals.

== Playing career ==
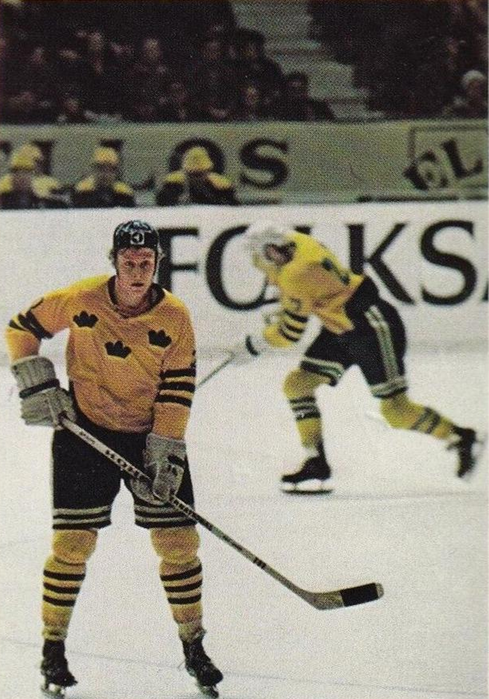
Hedberg for Sweden, c. 1970

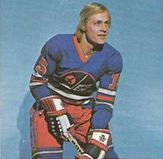
Hedberg with the Winnipeg Jets, c.1975

In the early 1970s Hedberg worked as an intern with Jerry Wilson, a Canadian former hockey player who was studying the physiology of hockey players, specifically their heart and lung conditioning. Wilson had been asked by the Winnipeg Jets of the World Hockey Association (WHA) to watch out for any notable Swedish hockey players, and he recommended both Hedberg and Ulf Nilsson, who was one of Wilson's subjects. Both would join the Jets in 1974. At the time the Toronto Maple Leafs of the National Hockey League owned Hedberg's NHL rights, but by going to the WHA there was no compensation required.

Hedberg was an instant sensation in the WHA, recording 100 points in 65 games in his first season, and playing alongside established superstar Bobby Hull. He scored at least 50 goals and 100 points in his other three WHA seasons, peaking with 70 goals and 61 assists in 1976-77 despite only playing 68 games that year. The 1976-77 season saw him play with broken ribs and play 47 of the first 49 games while scoring 51 goals, with the historic 50th goal occurring on February 6, 1977. Hedberg became the third player after Maurice Richard and Bobby Hull to accomplish the feat.

Hedberg played a starring role when the Jets won the Avco World Trophy WHA championship in 1976 and 1978. By this time both Hedberg and Nilsson were looking to join the NHL, as they had nothing left to prove in the WHA. They were also looking for a massive increase in salary: both had earned around $125,000 in the 1976–77 season. With their high salary demands, the only NHL team capable of signing them was the New York Rangers. While the Jets stated they wanted to re-sign both players, the team did not have the financial backing to do so.

In the summer of 1978, Nilsson and Hedberg signed with the Rangers. Each signed contracts $600,000 per season for two years. Their signings further weakened the struggling WHA which would cease operations after just one more season. This was one of the first open acknowledgements that the quality of the WHA was on par with the NHL, making a merger with the WHA possible the following summer.

In his first NHL season, Hedberg was a member of the NHL All-Stars that faced the USSR National Team in the 1979 Challenge Cup.

Hedberg recorded 856 professional points in North American hockey over 751 games, and retired from the Rangers in 1985.

== Post-playing career ==
After his active career, Hedberg became an assistant to general manager Craig Patrick of the New York Rangers, the first European to have a front office job in the NHL. Between 1991 and 1997 he worked as a scout for the Toronto Maple Leafs before moving up to the position as assistant general manager from 1997 to 1999.

In 2000, he was appointed general manager of the Swedish national ice hockey team, later serving with the Ottawa Senators as Director of Player Personnel from 2002 to 2007. In August 2007, he returned to the New York Rangers as the Head Professional European Scout. He was elected to the Swedish Hockey Hall of Fame on 11 February 2012.

== Awards and achievements ==
- Swedish Junior Player of the Year (1969 and 1970)
- Named Best Forward at EJC-A (1970)
- Lou Kaplan Trophy winner (1975)
- WHA Second All-Star Team (1975 and 1978)
- WHA First All-Star Team (1976 and 1977)
- Avco Cup championships (1976 and 1978)
- Played in the 1976 Canada Cup and 1981 Canada Cup tournament
- Bill Masterton Trophy winner (1985)
- Played in NHL All-Star Game (1985)
- Inducted into the IIHF Hall of Fame in 1997
- Honoured Member of the Manitoba Hockey Hall of Fame
- In the 2009 book 100 Ranger Greats, was ranked No. 36 all-time of the 901 New York Rangers who had played during the team's first 82 seasons
- Inaugural member of the World Hockey Association Hall of Fame.
- Scored 50 goals in 50 games in 1977

== Career statistics ==
=== Regular season and playoffs ===
			Regular season					Playoffs
Season	Team	League	GP	G	A	Pts	PIM	GP	G	A	Pts	PIM
1966–67	Svedjeholmens IK	SWE III	16	24	—	24	—	—	—	—	—	—
1967–68	Modo AIK	SWE	24	12	6	18	—	—	—	—	—	—
1968–69	Modo AIK	SWE	19	10	13	23	2	—	—	—	—	—
1969–70	Modo AIK	SWE	14	9	14	23	2	—	—	—	—	—
1970–71	Modo AIK	SWE	14	7	6	13	0	—	—	—	—	—
1971–72	Modo AIK	SWE	2	1	0	1	0	6	3	5	8	0
1972–73	Djurgårdens IF	SWE	12	6	3	9	2	14	6	7	13	4
1973–74	Djurgårdens IF	SWE	14	10	6	16	2	14	7	7	14	4
1974–75	Winnipeg Jets	WHA	65	53	47	100	45	—	—	—	—	—
1975–76	Winnipeg Jets	WHA	76	50	55	105	48	13	13	6	19	15
1976–77	Winnipeg Jets	WHA	68	70	61	131	48	20	13	16	29	13
1977–78	Winnipeg Jets	WHA	77	63	59	122	60	9	9	6	15	2
1978–79	New York Rangers	NHL	80	33	45	78	33	18	5	4	9	12
1979–80	New York Rangers	NHL	80	32	39	71	21	9	3	2	5	7
1980–81	New York Rangers	NHL	80	30	40	70	52	14	8	8	16	6
1981–82	New York Rangers	NHL	4	0	1	1	0	—	—	—	—	—
1982–83	New York Rangers	NHL	78	25	34	59	12	9	4	8	12	4
1983–84	New York Rangers	NHL	79	32	35	67	16	5	1	0	1	0
1984–85	New York Rangers	NHL	64	20	31	51	10	3	2	1	3	2
NHL totals			465	172	225	397	144	58	22	24	46	31
SWE totals			99	55	48	103	8	34	16	19	35	8
WHA totals			286	236	222	458	201	42	35	28	63	30

=== International ===
Year	Team	Comp	GP	G	A	Pts	PIM
1968	Sweden	EJC	5	6	1	7	0
1969	Sweden	EJC	5	5	0	5	2
1970	Sweden	EJC	5	6	—	—	—
1970	Sweden	WC	9	2	3	5	0
1972	Sweden	WC	10	6	5	11	4
1973	Sweden	WC	10	2	5	7	0
1974	Sweden	WC	10	7	3	10	2
1976	Sweden	CC	5	3	2	5	4
1981	Sweden	CC	5	4	2	6	0
Junior totals			15	17	—	—	—
Senior totals			49	24	20	44	10

Preceded by Brad Park	Bill Masterton Trophy winner 1985	Succeeded by Charlie Simmer
