= Curt Larsson =

Swedish ice hockey goaltender

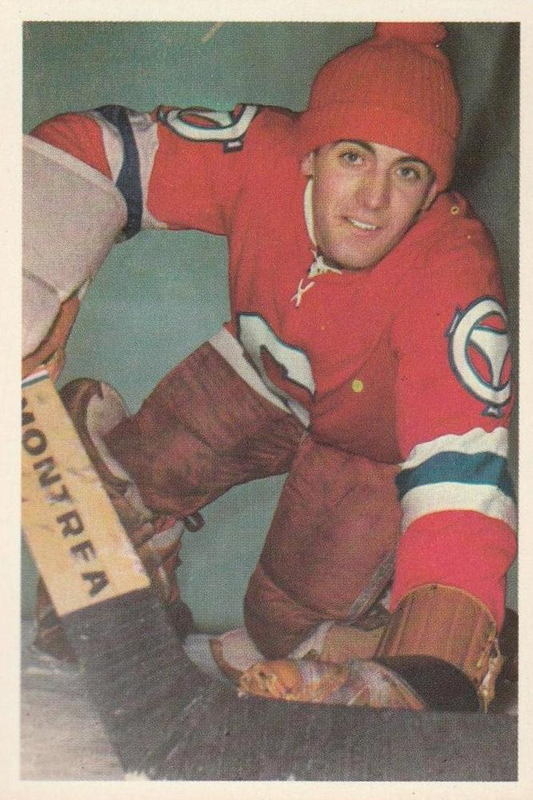
- Larsson in 1967 card
- Born: December 11, 1944 (age 81) Nyköping, Sweden
- Height: 5 ft 10 in (178 cm)
- Weight: 170 lb (77 kg; 12 st 2 lb)
- Position: Goaltender
- Caught: Left
- Played for: WHA; Winnipeg Jets; Sweden; Södertälje SK
- NHL draft: Undrafted
- Playing career: 1974–1978

Curt Larsson (born December 11, 1944) is a Swedish former professional ice hockey goaltender.

Between 1974 and 1977, Larsson played 68 games in the World Hockey Association (WHA) with the Winnipeg Jets.

== Career statistics ==
=== Regular season and playoffs ===
			Regular season									Playoffs
Season	Team	League	GP	W	L	T	MIN	GA	SO	GAA	SV%	GP	W	L	MIN	GA	SO	GAA	SV%
1974–75	Winnipeg Jets	WHA	26	12	11	1	1514	100	1	3.96	.887	—	—	—	—	—	—	—	—
1975–76	Winnipeg Jets	WHA	23	11	10	1	1287	83	0	3.87	.869	2	—	—	—	—	—	—	—
1976–77	Winnipeg Jets	WHA	19	7	9	0	1019	82	0	4.83	.850	1	—	—	—	—	—	—	—
1977–78	Sodertalje SK	SEL	5	—	—	—	258	20	0	4.65	—	—	—	—	—	—	—	—	—
WHA totals			68	30	30	2	3820	265	1	4.16	.872	—	—	—	—	—	—	—	—
