= Larry Hornung =

Canadian ice hockey player (1945–2001)

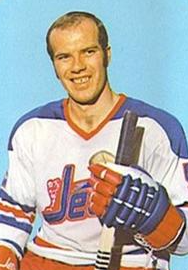
- Born: November 10, 1945 Gravelbourg, Saskatchewan, Canada
- Died: May 8, 2001 (aged 55) Regina, Saskatchewan, Canada
- Height: 5 ft 11 in (180 cm)
- Weight: 185 lb (84 kg; 13 st 3 lb)
- Position: Defence
- Shot: Left
- Played for: St. Louis Blues; Winnipeg Jets; Edmonton Oilers; San Diego Mariners
- NHL draft: Undrafted
- Playing career: 1966–1978

Larry John Hornung (November 10, 1945 – May 8, 2001) was a Canadian professional ice hockey player who played 48 games in the National Hockey League and 371 games in the World Hockey Association. He was born in Gravelbourg, Saskatchewan and played for the Winnipeg Jets, Edmonton Oilers, San Diego Mariners of the WHA and the St. Louis Blues of the NHL.

Larry Hornung died in Regina, Saskatchewan at the age of 55, after suffering from cancer for a year.

== Career statistics ==
=== Regular season and playoffs ===
			Regular season					Playoffs
Season	Team	League	GP	G	A	Pts	PIM	GP	G	A	Pts	PIM
1964–65	Moose Jaw Pla-Mors	SSHL	Statistics Unavailable
1965–66	Weyburn Red Wings	SJHL	Statistics Unavailable
1966–67	Toledo Blades	IHL	72	8	29	37	34	10	1	6	7	20
1967–68	Kansas City Blues	CHL	70	7	30	37	74	7	0	1	1	0
1968–69	Buffalo Bisons	AHL	60	7	18	25	38	6	0	0	0	2
1968–69	Kansas City Blues	CHL	2	0	1	1	2	—	—	—	—	—
1969–70	Buffalo Bisons	AHL	54	6	26	32	24	14	2	4	6	20
1969–70	Kansas City Blues	CHL	12	2	6	8	10	—	—	—	—	—
1970–71	Kansas City Blues	CHL	70	3	17	20	49	—	—	—	—	—
1970–71	St. Louis Blues	NHL	1	0	0	0	0	—	—	—	—	—
1971–72	Kansas City Blues	CHL	26	2	20	22	23	—	—	—	—	—
1971–72	St. Louis Blues	NHL	46	2	9	11	10	11	0	2	2	2
1972–73	Winnipeg Jets	WHA	77	13	45	58	28	14	2	9	11	0
1973–74	Winnipeg Jets	WHA	51	4	19	23	18	4	0	0	0	0
1974–75	Winnipeg Jets	WHA	69	7	25	32	21	—	—	—	—	—
1975–76	Winnipeg Jets	WHA	76	3	18	21	26	13	0	3	3	6
1976–77	Edmonton Oilers	WHA	21	2	1	3	0	—	—	—	—	—
1976–77	San Diego Mariners	WHA	58	4	9	13	8	6	0	0	0	0
1977–78	Winnipeg Jets	WHA	19	1	4	5	2	—	—	—	—	—
WHA totals			371	34	121	155	103	37	2	12	14	6
NHL totals			47	2	9	11	10	11	0	2	2	2
