= Thommie Bergman =

Swedish retired ice hockey player

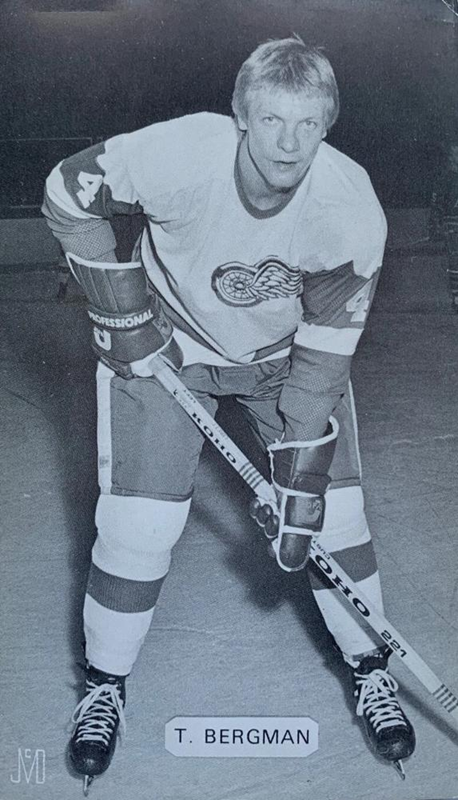
- Bergman in 1970s postcard
- Born: 10 December 1947 (age 78) Munkfors, Sweden
- Height: 6 ft 3 in (191 cm)
- Weight: 200 lb (91 kg; 14 st 4 lb)
- Position: Defence
- Shot: Left
- Played for: Detroit Red Wings; Winnipeg Jets
- National team: Sweden
- NHL draft: Undrafted
- Playing career: 1968–1983

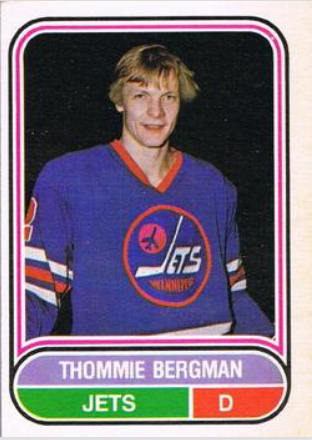
1975-76 card of Bergman for Winnipeg Jets

Thommie Lars Rudolf Bergman (born 10 December 1947) is a Swedish retired ice hockey player.

He played for the Detroit Red Wings in the National Hockey League (NHL) and the Winnipeg Jets in the World Hockey Association (WHA). In Sweden he played for IFK Munkfors, KB Karlskoga, Västra Frölunda HC and Södertälje SK.

He competed as a member of the Sweden men's national ice hockey team at the 1972 Winter Olympics held in Japan.

Bergman now lives in Stockholm, Sweden, where he works as a scout for the Toronto Maple Leafs.

== Career statistics ==
			Regular season					Playoffs
Season	Team	League	GP	G	A	Pts	PIM	GP	G	A	Pts	PIM
1968–69	KB Karlskoga	Division 1	20	4	2	6	22	—	—	—	—	—
1969–70	Södertälje SK	Division 1	28	9	6	15	—	—	—	—	—	—
1970–71	Södertälje SK	Division 1	26	11	8	19	32	—	—	—	—	—
1971–72	Västra Frölunda IF	Division 1	26	9	9	18	36	—	—	—	—	—
1972–73	Detroit Red Wings	NHL	75	9	12	21	70	—	—	—	—	—
1972–73	Virginia Wings	AHL	8	0	3	3	9	—	—	—	—	—
1973–74	Detroit Red Wings	NHL	43	0	3	3	21	—	—	—	—	—
1974–75	Detroit Red Wings	NHL	18	0	1	1	27	—	—	—	—	—
1974–75	Winnipeg Jets	WHA	49	4	15	19	70	—	—	—	—	—
1975–76	Winnipeg Jets	WHA	81	11	30	41	111	13	3	10	13	8
1976–77	Winnipeg Jets	WHA	42	2	24	26	37	—	—	—	—	—
1977–78	Winnipeg Jets	WHA	62	5	28	33	43	—	—	—	—	—
1977–78	Detroit Red Wings	NHL	14	1	6	7	16	7	0	2	2	2
1978–79	Detroit Red Wings	NHL	68	10	17	27	64	—	—	—	—	—
1979–80	Detroit Red Wings	NHL	28	1	5	6	45	—	—	—	—	—
1979–80	Adirondack Red Wings	AHL	15	0	2	2	7	—	—	—	—	—
1980–81	Västra Frölunda IF	SHL	33	9	8	17	101	2	0	0	0	4
1981–82	Södertälje SK	Division 1	27	11	12	23	73	8	0	1	1	6
1982–83	Södertälje SK	Division 1	20	9	7	16	44	3	4	4	8	2
NHL totals			246	21	44	65	243	7	0	2	2	2
WHA totals			234	22	97	119	261	13	3	10	13	8
