= Willy Lindström =

Swedish ice hockey player

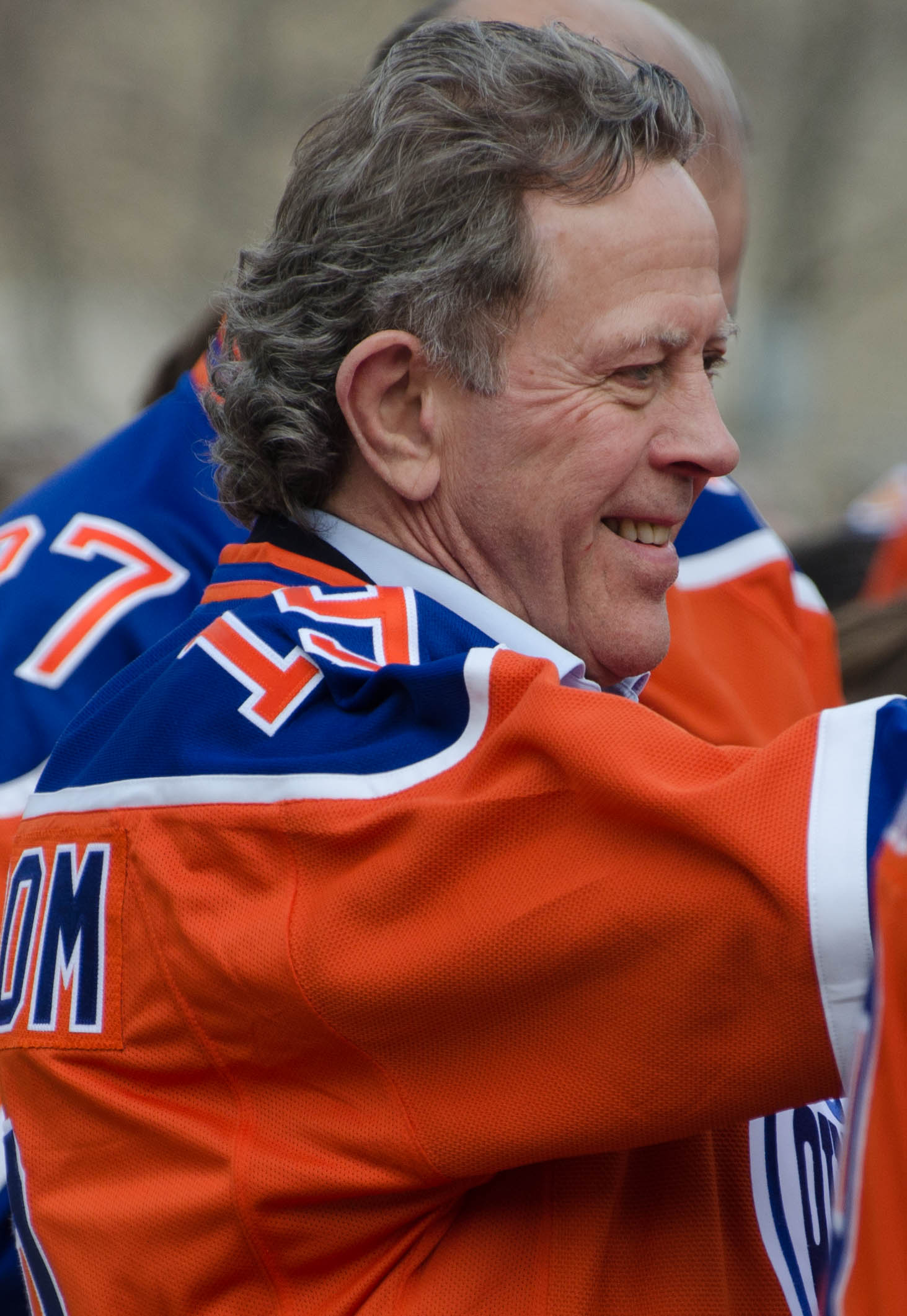
- Lindstrom in 2016
- Born: May 5, 1951 (age 75) Grums, Sweden
- Height: 6 ft 1 in (185 cm)
- Weight: 170 lb (77 kg; 12 st 2 lb)
- Position: Right wing
- Shot: Left
- Played for: WHA; Winnipeg Jets; NHL; Edmonton Oilers; Pittsburgh Penguins; SEL; Brynäs IF
- National team: Sweden
- Playing career: 1975–1990

Bo Morgan Willy Lindström (born May 5, 1951) is a Swedish former ice hockey player for the Winnipeg Jets, Edmonton Oilers and Pittsburgh Penguins. He was a three-time Avco World Trophy winner with the Jets and two-time Stanley Cup winner with the Oilers.

== Career ==
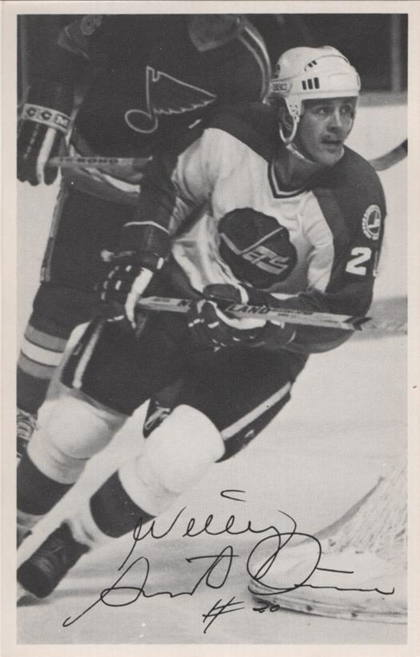
Lindstrom in 1981 for the Winnipeg Jets

Willy Lindström was born i Grums, Värmland, Sweden. He began playing ice hockey in Grums IK during the 1960s.

Lindström joined Västra Frölunda HC in 1970 and made his debut in the top-level ice hockey league in Sweden. Lindström signed a contract as a free agent with the Winnipeg Jets in the WHA in 1975. He was one of the top scorers in the WHA four years in a row.

Lindström was traded to the Edmonton Oilers for Laurie Boschman in March 1983. He won two Stanley Cups with the Edmonton Oilers in 1984 and 1985. Lindström is the only player to have had both Bobby Hull and Wayne Gretzky as teammates, as well as Mario Lemieux. Lindström scored five goals in a game against the Philadelphia Flyers at the Spectrum on 2 March 1982, becoming the first non-Canadian to accomplish the feat.

Lindström later returned to Swedish ice hockey, where he joined Brynäs IF. He ended his professional career in 1990.

== Personal life ==
Lindström has a son Liam Lindström who played for the Phoenix RoadRunners of the ECHL, and in various levels of Swedish hockey.

== Career statistics ==
=== Regular season and playoffs ===
			Regular season					Playoffs
Season	Team	League	GP	G	A	Pts	PIM	GP	G	A	Pts	PIM
1967–68	Grums IK	SWE II	22	11	6	17	—	—	—	—	—	—
1968–69	Grums IK	SWE II	21	11	10	21	—	—	—	—	—	—
1969–70	Grums IK	SWE II	19	30	12	42	—	—	—	—	—	—
1970–71	Västra Frölunda IF	SWE	14	7	4	11	10	8	3	0	3	2
1971–72	Västra Frölunda IF	SWE	27	12	11	23	18	—	—	—	—	—
1972–73	Västra Frölunda IF	SWE	14	7	5	12	14	14	6	1	7	4
1973–74	Västra Frölunda IF	SWE	27	19	11	30	22	—	—	—	—	—
1974–75	Västra Frölunda IF	SWE	29	18	15	33	24	—	—	—	—	—
1975–76	Winnipeg Jets	WHA	81	23	36	59	32	13	4	7	11	2
1976–77	Winnipeg Jets	WHA	79	44	36	80	37	20	9	6	15	22
1977–78	Winnipeg Jets	WHA	77	30	30	60	42	8	3	4	7	17
1978–79	Winnipeg Jets	WHA	79	26	36	62	22	10	10	5	15	9
1979–80	Winnipeg Jets	NHL	79	23	26	49	20	—	—	—	—	—
1980–81	Winnipeg Jets	NHL	72	22	13	35	45	—	—	—	—	—
1981–82	Winnipeg Jets	NHL	74	32	27	59	33	4	2	1	3	2
1982–83	Winnipeg Jets	NHL	63	20	25	45	8	—	—	—	—	—
1982–83	Edmonton Oilers	NHL	10	6	5	11	2	16	2	11	13	4
1983–84	Edmonton Oilers	NHL	73	22	16	38	38	19	5	5	10	10
1984–85	Edmonton Oilers	NHL	80	12	20	32	18	18	5	1	6	8
1985–86	Pittsburgh Penguins	NHL	71	14	17	31	30	—	—	—	—	—
1986–87	Pittsburgh Penguins	NHL	60	10	13	23	6	—	—	—	—	—
1987–88	Brynäs IF	SEL	35	14	9	23	38	—	—	—	—	—
1988–89	Brynäs IF	SEL	29	12	5	17	26	5	3	1	4	4
1989–90	Brynäs IF	SEL	29	8	5	13	12	3	0	0	0	0
SWE totals			111	63	46	109	88	22	9	1	10	6
WHA totals			316	123	138	261	133	51	26	22	48	50
NHL totals			582	161	162	323	200	57	14	18	32	24

=== International ===
Year	Team	Event	GP	G	A	Pts	PIM
1974	Sweden	WC	9	7	5	12	6
1975	Sweden	WC	7	2	1	3	4
1976	Sweden	CC	1	0	0	0	5
Senior totals			17	9	6	15	15

== Awards ==
- NHL Stanley Cup (1984, 1985)
- WHA Avco World Trophy - 1976, 1978, 1979
- Won bronze medals at the World Ice Hockey Championships in 1974 and 1975
- MVP in 1977 WHA All-Star Game
