= Houston Aeros (WHA) =

Former ice hockey team of the World Hockey Association

- City: Houston, Texas
- League: World Hockey Association
- Operated: 1972–1978
- Home arena: Sam Houston Coliseum (1972–75); The Summit (1975–78)
- Colors: Navy blue, powder blue, white
- Owners: Paul Deneau (1972–74); Irvin Kaplan (1974–75); George Bolin (1975–77); Kenneth Schnitzer (1977–78)
- Media: KHTV; KIKK

Franchise history
- 1972 (did not play): Dayton Arrows
- 1972–1978: Houston Aeros

Championships
- Regular season titles: 4 (1974, 1975, 1976, 1977)
- Division titles: 4 (1974, 1975, 1976, 1977)
- Avco Trophy: 2 (1974, 1975)

The Houston Aeros were a professional ice hockey team in the World Hockey Association (WHA) from 1972 to 1978.

== Franchise history ==
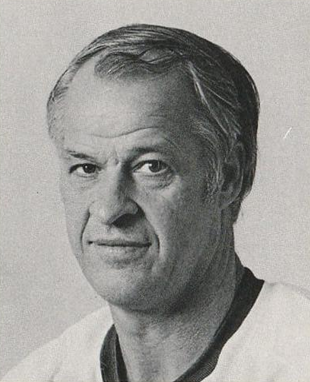
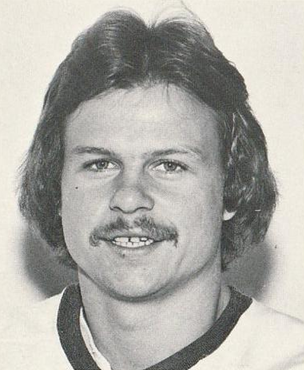
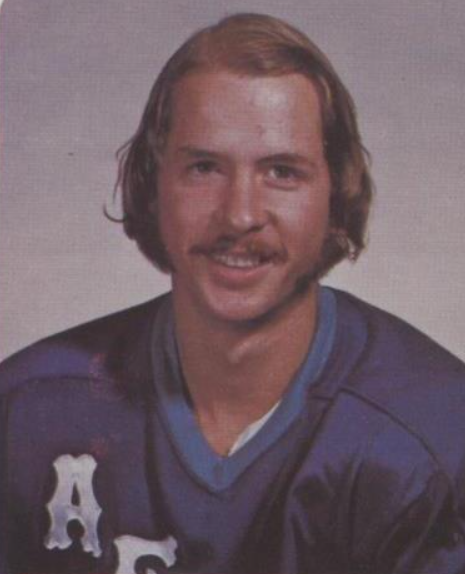
The Howe Family (Gordie, Mark, Marty)

In early 1971, the city of Dayton, Ohio was granted a franchise of the fledging World Hockey Association. A syndicate of owners soon rose up to operate the would-be franchise: James Smith, a Dayton lawyer that would serve as team president, Chairman of the Board Paul Deneau, an architectural engineer, public relations director Sonny Tate, and secretary treasurer Jack Evans. Management hired Bill Dineen to be head coach around the same time. However, Dayton residents were indifferent to a WHA team, and there were doubts that a U.S. market with less than a million people and a stagnating economy would support a major league hockey franchise. More important, in the short term, Dayton did not have a suitable arena. The largest one in the city, the University of Dayton Arena, did not have an ice plant and the university balked at the cost of installing one. A push to have the city to construct an arena for the team quickly went nowhere. On March 22, 1972, the city Commission delayed on whether the Dayton team could use the in-construction Convention Center for a venue. At the time, the Dayton Gems of the International Hockey League had their own contract at Hara Arena (which had a capacity of just 5,000) Due to the problems with Dayton, the organization moved the team to Houston, which received WHA approval. On March 30, 1972, a news conference announced the granting of the team in Houston that would be named the Aeros (supposedly the Dayton team was to be named the Arrows, but they never had announced the name prior to the move); supposedly, Deneau came up with calling the team the "Aeros" when seeing an AeroMexico jet on a tarmac. The Aeros began play in the Sam Houston Coliseum, which had been used as an arena on and off since 1937 but was thought of as "primitive" in certain press outlets. On October 12, 1972, the Aeros played their first ever regular season game, doing so against the Chicago Cougars, which the Aeros won 3–2.

On June 5, 1973, Mark and Marty Howe were signed to four-year contracts. A few weeks later, Gordie Howe signed a deal to play with his sons. On the debut of the 1973–74 season, on October 13, 1973, the Howes became the first father/son combination to play together in professional hockey, doing so against the Los Angeles Sharks. Paul Deneau sold his majority interest of the team to Houston investor Irvin Kaplan (the then-owner of the Houston Rockets) midway through the 1973–74 season. In the fall of 1975, Kaplan unexpectedly went into bankruptcy trouble and had to sell both the Rockets and Aeros, with George Bolin buying the Aeros. In 1977, Bolin sold the team to Kenneth Schnitzer, the developer of Greenway Plaza.

In Houston, the Aeros became one of the most successful franchises in the WHA. They won four consecutive Western Division titles, from 1973–74 to 1976–77, and finished second in the Western Division in 1972–73 and third in the league in 1977–78. They won the AVCO World Trophy in 1974 over the Chicago Cougars and in 1975 over the Quebec Nordiques, winning both series in four-game sweeps.

Despite their success on the ice, the team never made a profit in six seasons of play. By late 1976, rumblings of the Howes leaving Houston were present in the press. In the offseason prior to the 1976–77 season, Gordie Howe resigned as team president and signed a one-year deal to play with his sons, who while under contract for the season, did not sign a contract beyond that. After the season ended, the Howes were traded to the New England Whalers. By early 1977, it was reported that the Aeros were facing a financial crisis that could have necessitated having deferred paychecks for players (who were making an average salary of $75,000 that paled to the WHA league average of $85,000). Fan attendance was at just over 9,500 in the 1975–76 season that saw them go down to barely over 8,000. In 1977, John Ziegler became president of the National Hockey League, the WHA's established rival, and soon began the first serious discussions of merger with the WHA. Houston, along with Cincinnati, Winnipeg, New England, Quebec, and Edmonton applied for entry into the NHL. After a lengthy debate, NHL owners voted the proposal down. Discussions resumed in 1978, and it again appeared that the Aeros, as one of the league's strongest teams, were an obvious candidate to join the NHL. However, by now Ziegler realized NHL owners would never vote to admit six teams and proposed to admit four WHA franchises. The WHA responded by insisting that all three of its Canadian teams be included in the merger. This left room for only one American team. The Aeros and Whalers were the only serious contenders, as they were the most stable of the American teams. Aeros owner Kenneth Schnitzer tried to persuade Boston Bruins owner Jeremy Jacobs to support a merger that included the Aeros and not the Hartford-based Whalers, but Jacobs was opposed to any sort of merger with the WHA. Also, Ziegler was cool to the idea of admitting another team from the Sun Belt. Of the three Sun Belt teams that had joined the league since 1967, one, the California Golden Seals, had relocated and another, the Atlanta Flames, were struggling financially. (The Flames would move to Calgary two years later.)

During the final series of talks, it became evident that no merger would take place in time for the 1978–79 NHL season. It was also apparent that the Aeros were not likely to be included. Schnitzer announced that the Aeros would not take part in the 1978–79 WHA season. He first applied for direct admission to the NHL, only to find the older league uninterested, with so many of its existing franchises struggling. Finally, Schnitzer campaigned to purchase an existing club and relocate it to Houston. The obvious candidate to move was the Cleveland Barons (formerly the Golden Seals), who had barely survived the season and were on the verge of folding. Schnitzer believed the older league would accept almost any other proposal as an alternative to the embarrassment of having to disband a franchise and did come close to a deal to relocate the moribund Barons to Houston. However, the NHL opted instead to approve a proposal from the owners of the Minnesota North Stars to buy the Barons franchise and merge it with their own. The Aeros did not even attend the WHA meetings in June 1978. Having run out of options, Schnitzer folded the Aeros on July 9, 1978; the Aeros were thus the only WHA champion that did not join the NHL.

Mark Howe was the last active member of the Aeros, retiring as a member of the Detroit Red Wings, his father's old team, in 1995.

== Franchise scoring leaders ==
These are the top-ten point-scorers in Houston Aeros history. Legend: Pos = Position; GP = Games played; G = Goals; A = Assists; Pts = Points; P/G = Points per game

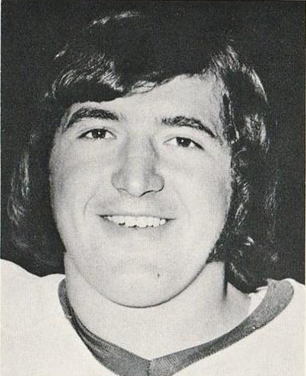
Frank Hughes of the Aeros, c. 1975. Hughes scored 149 goals for Houston, tied for the most in franchise history.

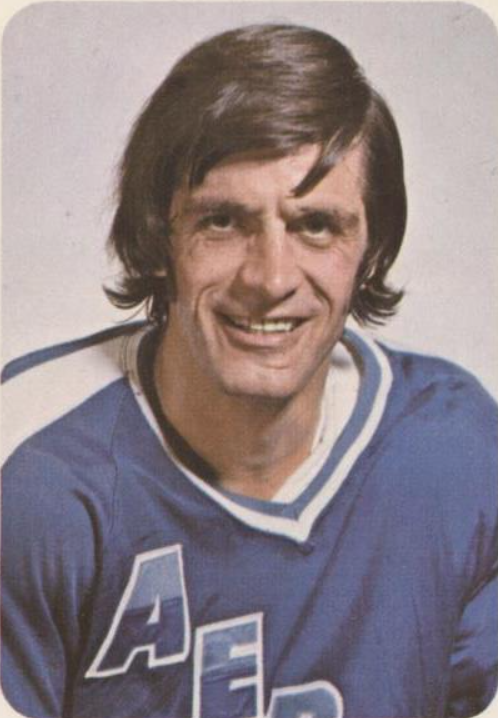
Larry Lund scored 149 goals and recorded 277 assists for 426 points with Houston, all of which were franchise records.

Points
Player	Pos	GP	G	A	Pts	P/G
Larry Lund	C	459	149	277	426	0.92
Gordie Howe	RW	291	121	248	369	1.26
Poul Popiel	D	468	62	265	327	0.69
Mark Howe	LW	279	136	170	306	1.09
Frank Hughes	LW	337	149	151	300	0.89
Ted Taylor	LW	420	123	164	287	0.68
Gord Labossiere	C	300	102	162	264	0.88
Terry Ruskowski	C	294	63	188	251	0.85
André Hinse	LW	240	100	144	244	1.01
Rich Preston	RW	308	105	120	225	0.73

== Season-by-season record ==
Note: GP = Games played, W = Wins, L = Losses, T = Ties, Pts = Points, GF = Goals for, GA = Goals against, PIM = Penalties in minutes

Season	Team season	Division	Regular season (Note: Code explanation; GP – games played, W – wins, L – losses, T – ties, GF – goals for, GA – goals against, Pts – points)								WHA Playoffs
Season	Team season	Division	Finish	GP	W	L	T	Pts	GF	GA	Result
1972–73	1972–73	Western	2nd	78	39	35	4	82	284	269	Won quarterfinals vs. Los Angeles Sharks, 4–2; Lost semifinals vs. Winnipeg Jets, 0–4
1973–74	1973–74	Western	1st	78	48	25	5	101	318	219	Won quarterfinals vs. Winnipeg Jets, 4–0; Won semifinals vs. Minnesota Fighting Saints, 4–2; Won Avco Cup Finals vs. Chicago Cougars, 4–0
1974–75	1974–75	Western	1st	78	53	25	0	106	369	247	Won quarterfinals vs. Cleveland Crusaders, 4–1; Won semifinals vs. San Diego Mariners, 4–0; Won Avco Cup Finals vs. Quebec Nordiques, 4–0
1975–76	1975–76	Western	1st	80	53	27	0	106	341	263	Won quarterfinals vs. San Diego Mariners, 4–2; Won semifinals vs. New England Whalers, 4–3; Lost Avco Cup Finals vs. Winnipeg Jets, 0–4
1976–77	1976–77	Western	1st	80	50	24	6	106	320	241	Won quarterfinals vs. Edmonton Oilers, 4–1; Lost semifinals vs. Winnipeg Jets, 4–2
1977–78	1977–78	WHA	3rd	80	42	34	4	88	296	302	Lost quarterfinals vs. Quebec Nordiques, 4–2
Totals				474	285	170	19	589	1928	1541	

== Awards and honors ==
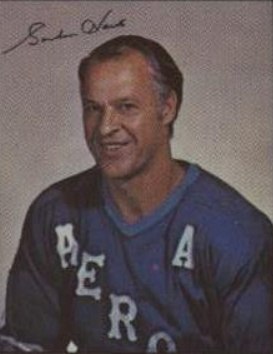
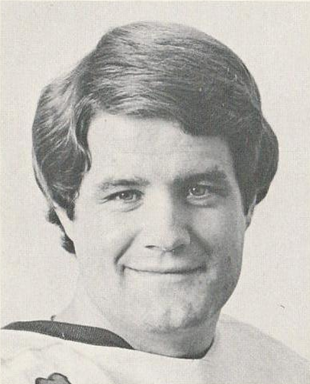
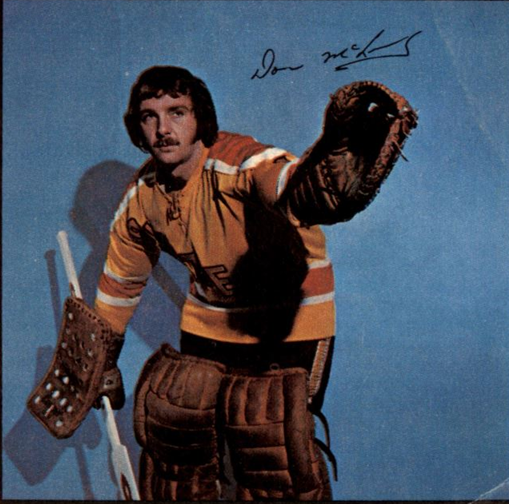
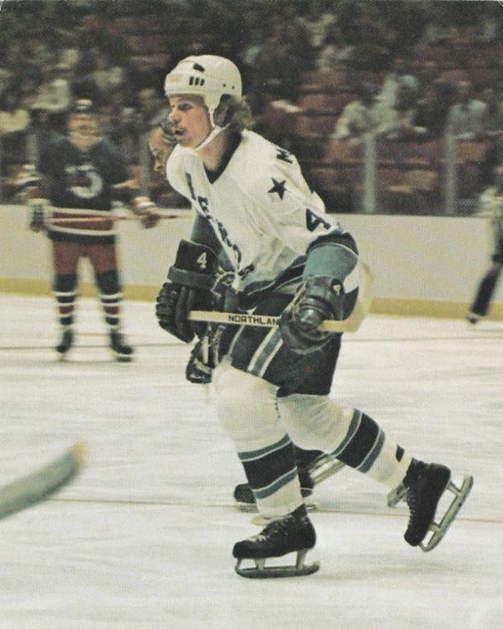
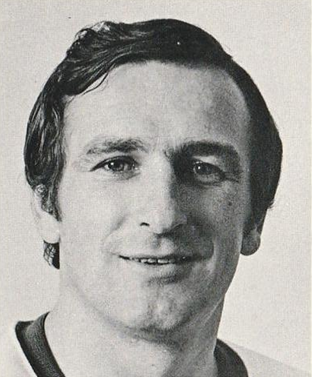

Gary L. Davidson Award / Gordie Howe Trophy

- Gordie Howe (1974)

Lou Kaplan Trophy

- Mark Howe (1974)

Ben Hatskin Trophy

- Don McLeod (1974)
- Ron Grahame (1975)
- Ron Grahame (1977)

Howard Baldwin Trophy

- Bill Dineen (1977, 1978)

WHA Playoff MVP

- Ron Grahame (1975)

WHA All-Star Team

- 1973–74: Gordie Howe (RW, 1st), Don McLeod (G, 1st), Mark Howe (LW, 2nd)
- 1974–75: Gordie Howe (RW, 1st), Ron Grahame (G, 1st), Poul Popiel (D, 2nd)
- 1975–76: Ron Grahame (G, 2nd)
- 1976–77: Mark Howe & Poul Popiel (D, 2nd)
- 1977–78: Ernie Wakely (G, 2nd)

== See also ==
- List of WHA seasons
- Houston Aeros (1994–2013)
- List of Houston Aeros (WHA) players
