= Freeman Asmundson =

Canadian ice hockey player

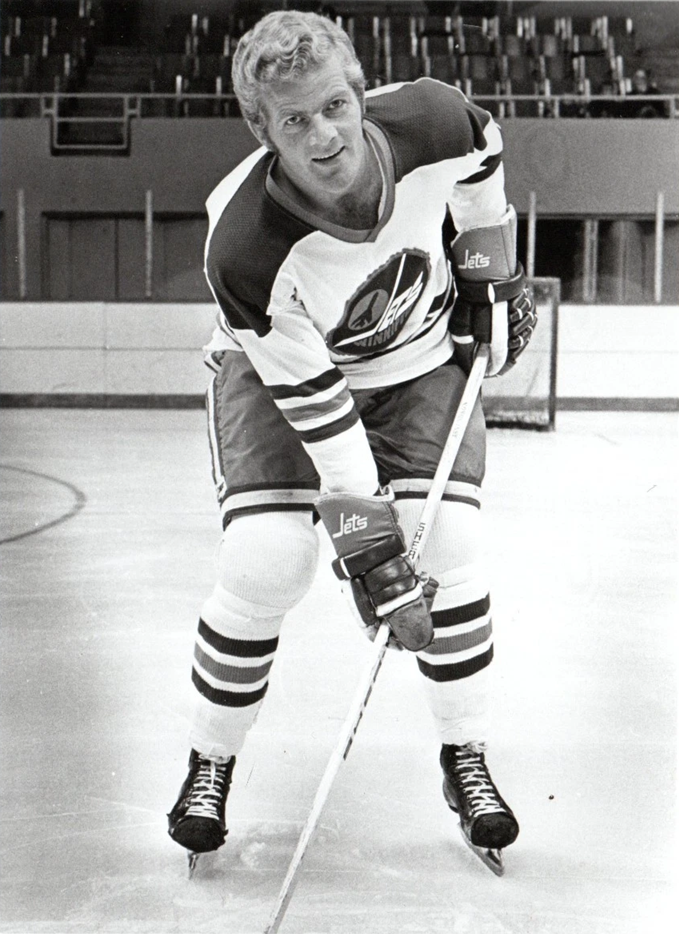
- Asmundson in 1972 photo
- Born: August 17, 1943 (age 82) Vita, Manitoba, Canada
- Height: 6 ft 2 in (188 cm)
- Weight: 195 lb (88 kg; 13 st 13 lb)
- Position: Right wing
- Shot: Right
- Played for: Winnipeg Jets (WHA)
- Playing career: 1964–1976

Freeman "Duke" Asmundson (born August 17, 1943) is a Canadian retired professional ice hockey player who played 258 games in the World Hockey Association. Born in Vita, Manitoba, he played for the Winnipeg Jets.

== Career statistics ==
			Regular season					Playoffs
Season	Team	League	GP	G	A	Pts	PIM	GP	G	A	Pts	PIM
1961–62	Winnipeg Monarchs	MJHL	Statistics Unavailable					—	—	—	—	—
1962–63	Winnipeg Monarchs	MJHL	Statistics Unavailable					—	—	—	—	—
1963–64	Winnipeg Monarchs	MJHL	30	16	22	38	31	—	—	—	—	—
1963–64	Winnipeg Maroons	SSHL	Statistics Unavailable					—	—	—	—	—
1964–65	Tulsa Oilers	CPHL	30	3	4	7	23	—	—	—	—	—
1964–65	St. Louis Braves	CPHL	3	1	1	2	0	—	—	—	—	—
1964–65	Rochester Americans	AHL	19	1	1	2	4	—	—	—	—	—
1965–66	Springfield Indians	AHL	5	0	1	1	2	—	—	—	—	—
1967–68	Toledo Blades	IHL	63	13	28	41	46	—	—	—	—	—
1968–69	Toledo-Dayton	IHL	72	22	37	59	43	9	1	2	3	4
1969–70	Des Moines Oak Leafs	IHL	72	25	48	73	51	8	4	5	9	2
1970–71	Des Moines Oak Leafs	IHL	72	31	47	78	47	14	9	5	14	30
1971–72	Des Moines Oak Leafs	IHL	72	35	46	81	48	3	0	0	0	2
1972–73	Winnipeg Jets	WHA	76	2	14	16	54	12	1	2	3	8
1973–74	Winnipeg Jets	WHA	72	5	14	19	85	4	0	1	1	2
1974–75	Winnipeg Jets	WHA	38	4	15	19	53	—	—	—	—	—
1975–76	Winnipeg Jets	WHA	72	5	11	16	19	13	3	2	5	11
IHL totals			351	126	206	332	235	34	14	12	28	38
AHL totals			24	1	2	3	6	—	—	—	—	—
WHA totals			258	16	54	70	211	29	4	5	9	21

== Awards and achievements ==
- MJHL Second All-Star Team (1964)
- WHA Championship (1976)
