= Mats Lindh =

Swedish ice hockey player (1947–2025)

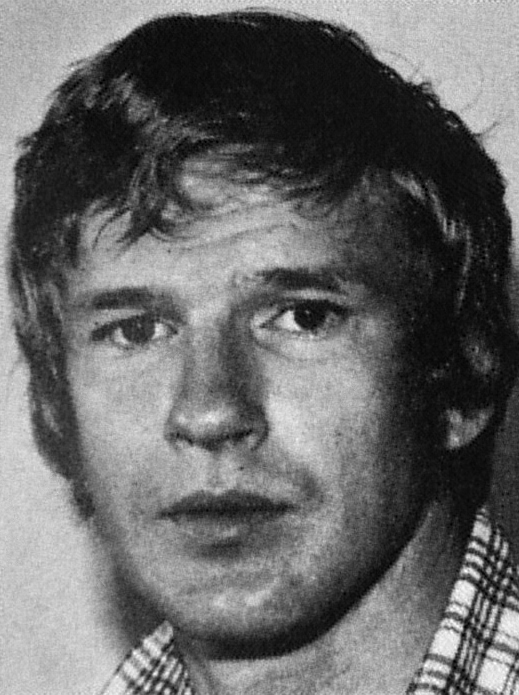
- Lindh in 1972
- Born: 12 September 1947 Orsa, Sweden
- Died: 8 August 2025 (aged 77) Göteborg, Sweden
- Height: 5 ft 11 in (180 cm)
- Weight: 172 lb (78 kg; 12 st 4 lb)
- Position: Centre
- Shot: Left
- Played for: WHA; Winnipeg Jets; SEL; Västra Frölunda IF; Mora IK
- National team: Sweden
- Playing career: 1966–1982

Mats Ingemar Lindh (12 September 1947 – 8 August 2025) was a Swedish professional ice hockey player. He played 13 seasons at the top tier of Swedish ice hockey with Mora IK and Västra Frölunda IF, and spent two seasons in North America with the Winnipeg Jets of the World Hockey Association (WHA), winning the Avco World Trophy in 1976. Lindh competed as a member of the Sweden men's national ice hockey team at the 1972 Winter Olympics held in Japan. He also won the World Championship bronze medal twice, playing for Team Sweden, in 1972 in 1975.

== Playing career ==
Lindh grew up in Stackmora, a smal community in Orsa Municipality in Dalarna. He lived right next to the local outdoor ice rink, where he spent most of his time, eating dinner at home wearing his skates so he could quickly get back to the rink. He began his senior career in the 1964–65 season with Stackmora SK in Division 4, Sweden's fourth tier hockey league. The following year he joined nearby club Mora IK in Division 2, scoring 12 goals in 22 games as Mora IK were promoted to Division 1 for the 1966–67 season, where Lindh appeared in 23 games and scored 8 goals.

In 1967–68 he remained with Mora IK in Division 1, recording 3 goals and 11 points over 28 games. The 1968–69 season saw him post 14 goals and 21 points in 20 regular-season games, along with 3 goals and 4 points in 7 playoff appearances; he also represented Sweden B in international play, scoring six goals in six games.

He enjoyed a productive 1969–70 campaign with Mora IK, tallying 18 goals and 34 points in 28 games. The following season he joined Örebro SK in Division 2, scoring 15 goals, and also appeared in international matches for Sweden.

In 1971–72 he moved to Västra Frölunda IF in Division 1, where he posted 17 goals and 31 points in 27 games. That season he also represented Sweden at the 1972 Winter Olympics and the 1972 World Ice Hockey Championships, recording 1 goal in each tournament.

He remained with Västra Frölunda for the 1972–73 season, scoring 12 goals and 27 points in 28 games, and in 1973–74 he improved to 15 goals and 37 points in 35 games. In 1974–75 he scored 14 goals and 28 points in 28 games and added 1 goal and 8 points in 8 games at the 1975 World Ice Hockey Championships.

For the 1975–76 season he signed with the Winnipeg Jets (WHA) of the World Hockey Association, recording 19 goals and 34 points in 65 regular-season games, and adding 2 goals and 4 points in 13 playoff games as the Jets captured the Avco World Trophy. He returned to Winnipeg in 1976–77, scoring 14 goals and 31 points in 73 games, and posting 2 goals and 9 points in 20 playoff contests.

He rejoined Västra Frölunda in 1977–78, now competing in the Elitserien, and scored 16 goals and 28 points in 35 games. The following season he managed 6 goals and 13 points in 19 games, and in 1979–80 he contributed 5 goals and 11 points in 31 games plus 6 playoff appearances. In 1980–81 he tallied 11 goals and 24 points in 32 games, adding 1 goal in 2 playoff contests. His final top-level season came in 1981–82, when he appeared in 4 games for Västra Frölunda.

== Personal life ==
After his playing career, Lindh got a degree from the Swedish School of Sport and Health Sciences, and was one of the initiators of the hockey high school at Burgården in Gothenburg, which later developed into the program through which Frölunda runs its youth academy. Among his students were future NHL players Daniel Alfredsson and P. J. Axelsson.

Lindh died on 8 August 2025, at the age of 77.

== Career statistics ==
=== Regular season and playoffs ===
			Regular season					Playoffs
Season	Team	League	GP	G	A	Pts	PIM	GP	G	A	Pts	PIM
1965–66	Mora IK	Division 2	22	12	—	—	—	—	—	—	—	—
1966–67	Mora IK	Division 1	23	8	—	—	—	—	—	—	—	—
1967–68	Mora IK	Division 1	28	8	3	11	—	—	—	—	—	—
1968–69	Mora IK	Division 1	20	14	7	21	2	7	3	1	4	0
1969–70	Mora IK	Division 1	28	18	16	34	—	—	—	—	—	—
1970–71	Örebro SK	Division 2	—	15	—	—	—	—	—	—	—	—
1971–72	Västra Frölunda IF	Division 1	27	17	14	31	4	—	—	—	—	—
1972–73	Västra Frölunda IF	Division 1	28	12	15	27	2	—	—	—	—	—
1973–74	Västra Frölunda IF	Division 1	35	15	22	37	2	—	—	—	—	—
1974–75	Västra Frölunda IF	Division 1	28	14	14	28	2	—	—	—	—	—
1975–76	Winnipeg Jets	WHA	65	19	15	34	12	13	2	2	4	4
1976–77	Winnipeg Jets	WHA	73	14	17	31	2	20	2	7	9	2
1977–78	Västra Frölunda IF	SEL	35	16	12	28	6	—	—	—	—	—
1978–79	Västra Frölunda IF	SEL	19	6	7	13	2	—	—	—	—	—
1979–80	Västra Frölunda IF	SEL	31	5	6	11	10	6	0	0	0	0
1980–81	Västra Frölunda IF	SEL	32	11	13	24	2	2	1	0	1	0
1981–82	Västra Frölunda IF	SEL	4	0	0	0	2	—	—	—	—	—
SEL/Division 1 totals			338	144	129	273	34	15	4	1	5	0
WHA totals			138	33	32	65	14	33	4	9	13	6

=== International ===
Year	Team	Event	Result	GP	G	A	Pts	PIM
1972	Sweden	OG	4th	4	1	0	1	0
1972	Sweden	WC	3rd place, bronze medalist(s)	4	1	0	1	0
1975	Sweden	WC	3rd place, bronze medalist(s)	8	1	7	8	0
Int' totals				16	3	7	10	0
