= List of Winnipeg Jets (WHA) players =

This is a list of players who played at least one game for the Winnipeg Jets of the World Hockey Association (WHA) (1972–1979). For a list of players who played for the Jets in the National Hockey League, see List of Winnipeg Jets (1979–1996) players.

== Key ==
- † Won a Avco World Trophy with the Jets

General abbreviations
Abbreviation	Definition
GP	Games played
HHOF	Inducted into the Hockey Hall of Fame as a player
AWT	Won the Avco World Trophy with the team, followed by year(s) won

Goaltender statistical abbreviations
Abbreviation	Definition
W	Wins
L	Losses
T	Ties
SO	Shutouts
GAA	Goals against average

Skater statistical abbreviations
Abbreviation	Definition
Pos	Position
G	Goals
A	Assists
P	Points
PIM	Penalty minutes
D	Defence
LW	Left wing
C	Centre
RW	Right wing

== Goaltenders ==
Goaltenders who played for the Winnipeg Jets
Name	Seasons (Note: The seasons column lists the first year of the season of the player's first game and the last year of the season of the player's last game. For example, a player who played one game in the 1972–1973 season would be listed as playing with the team from 1972–1973, regardless of what calendar year the game occurred within.)	Regular season						Playoffs					Notes
Name	Seasons	GP	W	L	T	SO	GAA	GP	W	L	SO	GAA	Notes
Frank Blum	1973–1974	–	–	–	–	–	–	2	–	–	0	–	
Gary Bromley†	1977–1978	39	25	12	1	1	3.30	5	–	–	0	–	AWT: 1978
Joe Daley†	1972–1979	308	167	113	13	12	3.37	49	–	–	2	–	AWT: 1976, 1978, 1979
Bill Holden	1973–1974	1	0	1	0	0	4.00	–	–	–	–	–	
Curt Larsson†	1974–1977	68	30	30	2	1	4.16	3	–	–	0	–	AWT: 1976
Markus Mattsson	1977–1979	62	29	26	3	0	3.62	–	–	–	–	–	
Gary Smith†	1978–1979	11	7	3	0	0	2.97	10	–	–	0	–	AWT: 1979
Gordon Tumilson	1972–1973	3	0	2	0	0	4.35	–	–	–	–	–	
Ernie Wakely	1972–1975	92	44	40	7	6	3.17	7	–	–	2	–	

== Skaters ==
Skaters who played for the Winnipeg Jets
Name	Pos	Seasons	Regular season					Playoffs					Notes
Name	Pos	Seasons	GP	G	A	P	PIM	GP	G	A	P	PIM	Notes
Mike Amodeo†	D	1977–1979	67	5	19	24	29	7	1	3	4	19	AWT: 1978
Randy Andreachuk	C	1974–1975	2	0	0	0	0	–	–	–	–	–	
Bob Ash	D	1972–1974	136	5	32	37	69	17	1	4	5	6	
Ron Ashton	LW	1974–1975	36	1	3	4	66	–	–	–	–	–	
Freeman Asmundson†	D	1972–1976	258	16	54	70	211	29	4	5	9	21	AWT: 1976
Ken Baird†	LW	1977–1978	49	14	7	21	29	7	0	4	4	7	AWT: 1978
Norm Beaudin†	RW	1972–1976	309	97	155	252	69	31	18	19	37	14	AWT: 1976
Alain Beaule	D	1974–1975	54	0	14	14	24	–	–	–	–	–	
Thommie Bergman†	D	1974–1978	234	22	97	119	261	13	3	10	13	8	AWT: 1976
Milt Black	RW	1972–1975	186	28	31	59	55	18	2	4	6	10	
Chris Bordeleau	LW	1972–1975	171	81	111	192	34	15	8	10	18	4	
Wally Boyer	C	1972–1973	69	6	28	34	27	14	4	2	6	4	
Brian Cadle	LW	1972–1973	56	4	4	8	39	3	0	0	0	0	
Scott Campbell†	D	1978–1979	74	3	15	18	248	10	0	2	2	25	AWT: 1979
Kim Clackson†	D	1977–1979	123	2	19	21	413	18	0	6	6	89	AWT: 1978, 1979
Jim Cole	LW	1976–1977	2	0	1	1	0	–	–	–	–	–	
Steve Cuddie	D	1972–1973	77	7	13	20	121	12	0	1	1	10	
Bill Davis	D	1977–1979	17	1	2	3	2	–	–	–	–	–	
Dave Dunn†	D	1976–1978	106	9	31	40	208	29	5	6	11	23	AWT: 1978
Roland Eriksson†	C	1978–1979	33	5	10	15	2	10	1	4	5	0	AWT: 1979
Mike Ford†	D	1974–1978	179	28	79	107	158	34	5	25	30	20	AWT: 1976, 1978
John Gibson	LW	1978–1979	9	0	1	1	5	–	–	–	–	–	
Rich Gosselin	C	1978–1979	3	0	0	0	0	–	–	–	–	–	
Jean-Guy Gratton	RW	1972–1975	188	31	41	72	52	14	1	1	2	4	
John Gray†	RW	1978–1979	57	10	15	25	51	1	0	0	0	0	AWT: 1979
Ted Green†	D	1975–1979	242	13	68	81	186	39	1	7	8	30	AWT: 1976, 1978
Danny Gruen	LW	1974–1975	32	9	12	21	21	–	–	–	–	–	
Bob Guindon†	LW	1975–1979	246	41	60	101	72	49	17	13	30	23	AWT: 1976, 1978, 1979
Jim Hargreaves	D	1973–1974	53	1	4	5	50	–	–	–	–	–	
Ted Hargreaves	LW	1973–1974	74	7	12	19	15	4	0	1	1	10	
Anders Hedberg†	RW	1974–1978	286	236	222	458	201	42	35	28	63	30	AWT: 1976, 1978
Glenn Hicks†	LW	1978–1979	69	6	10	16	48	7	1	1	2	4	AWT: 1979
Larry Hillman†	D	1975–1976	71	1	12	13	62	12	0	2	2	32	AWT: 1976
Larry Hornung†	D	1972–1978	292	28	111	139	95	31	2	12	14	6	AWT: 1976
Fran Huck	C	1973–1978	91	28	50	78	80	11	0	2	2	8	
Bobby Hull†	LW	1972–1979	411	303	335	638	183	60	43	37	80	38	AWT: 1976, 1978; HHOF – 1983
Danny Johnson	C	1972–1975	232	53	58	111	62	18	5	1	6	5	
Veli-Pekka Ketola†	C	1974–1977	218	80	93	173	116	13	7	5	12	2	AWT: 1976
Dave Kryskow†	LW	1977–1978	71	20	21	41	16	9	4	4	8	2	AWT: 1978
Dan Labraaten†	LW	1976–1978	111	42	43	85	51	24	8	18	26	23	AWT: 1978
Danny Lawson	RW	1976–1977	14	6	7	13	2	13	2	4	6	6	
Randy Legge	D	1975–1976	1	0	0	0	0	–	–	–	–	–	
Bill Lesuk†	RW	1975–1979	318	55	81	136	269	50	7	11	18	48	AWT: 1976, 1978, 1979
Mats Lindh†	C	1975–1977	138	33	32	65	14	33	4	9	13	6	AWT: 1976
Willy Lindstrom†	LW	1975–1979	316	123	138	261	133	51	26	22	48	50	AWT: 1976, 1978, 1979
Barry Long†	D	1976–1979	229	21	98	119	138	39	3	13	16	16	AWT: 1978, 1979
Morris Lukowich†	LW	1978–1979	80	65	34	99	119	10	8	7	15	21	AWT: 1979
Paul MacKinnon†	D	1978–1979	73	2	15	17	70	10	2	5	7	4	AWT: 1979
Ab McDonald	LW	1972–1974	147	29	41	70	24	18	2	6	8	4	
Perry Miller	D	1974–1977	188	30	56	86	298	20	4	6	10	27	
Lyle Moffat†	LW	1975–1979	243	49	54	103	211	49	13	11	24	46	AWT: 1976, 1978, 1979
Morris Mott	RW	1976–1977	2	0	1	1	5	–	–	–	–	–	
Robbie Neale	C	1974–1975	7	0	2	2	4	–	–	–	–	–	
Kent Nilsson†	C	1977–1979	158	81	133	214	16	19	5	19	24	14	AWT: 1978, 1979
Ulf Nilsson†	C	1974–1978	300	140	344	484	341	42	14	53	67	51	AWT: 1976, 1978
Gerry Odrowski	D	1975–1976	13	0	1	1	6	–	–	–	–	–	
Lynn Powis†	C	1977–1978	55	12	19	31	16	3	2	1	3	7	AWT: 1978
Kelly Pratt	RW	1973–1974	46	4	6	10	50	–	–	–	–	–	
Rich Preston†	RW	1978–1979	80	28	32	60	88	10	8	5	13	15	AWT: 1979
Heikki Riihiranta†	D	1974–1977	187	10	38	48	84	4	0	4	4	6	AWT: 1976
Garth Rizzuto	C	1972–1974	102	13	14	27	40	14	0	1	1	14	
Dunc Rousseau	LW	1972–1974	135	26	25	51	114	18	3	2	5	2	
Kent Ruhnke†	RW	1976–1978	72	19	20	39	4	5	2	0	2	0	AWT: 1978
Terry Ruskowski†	C	1978–1979	75	20	66	86	211	8	1	12	13	23	AWT: 1979
John Shmyr	D	1972–1973	7	0	0	0	2	3	0	1	1	2	
Lars-Erik Sjoberg†	D	1974–1979	295	25	169	194	147	52	1	22	23	42	AWT: 1976, 1978, 1979
Ron Snell	RW	1973–1975	90	24	25	49	40	4	0	0	0	0	
Dan Spring	C	1973–1975	126	27	40	67	30	4	0	1	1	0	
Ken Stephanson	D	1973–1974	29	0	7	7	24	3	0	2	2	10	
Peter Sullivan†	C	1975–1979	313	125	170	295	107	52	21	32	53	8	AWT: 1976, 1978, 1979
Bill Sutherland	LW	1972–1974	60	10	21	31	40	18	5	9	14	13	
Cal Swenson	C	1972–1974	102	12	25	37	21	15	1	5	6	7	
Paul Terbenche†	D	1978–1979	68	3	22	25	12	10	1	1	2	4	AWT: 1979
Ron Ward	C	1976–1977	14	4	7	11	2	–	–	–	–	–	
Steve West†	C	1978–1979	18	3	11	14	6	6	2	3	5	2	AWT: 1979
Bob Woytowich	D	1972–1975	158	8	36	44	98	18	1	1	2	4	
Dale Yakiwchuk	LW	1978–1979	4	0	0	0	0	–	–	–	–	–	
Howie Young	D	1974–1975	42	13	10	23	42	–	–	–	–	–	
Joe Zanussi	D	1972–1974	149	7	43	50	106	18	2	5	7	6	
