= 1978 WHA playoffs =

WHA postseason tournament

Tournament details
- Dates: April 14 – May 22, 1978
- Season: 1977–78
- Teams: 6
- Defending champions: Quebec Nordiques

Final positions
- Champions: Winnipeg Jets (2nd title)
- Runners-up: New England Whalers

Tournament statistics
- Scoring leader(s): Mike Antonovich (Whalers) (17 points)

Awards
- MVP: Bob Guindon (Jets)

The 1978 WHA playoffs was the postseason tournament of the World Hockey Association's 1977–78 season. With the abolishing of divisions, six of the eight teams would reach the playoffs. However, the league went for a unique format where there would three Quarterfinal playoffs and that the highest-seeded winner from those rounds would advance directly to the Avco Cup Final. The sixth WHA tournament, it was the only one with six teams in competition with each other. This was the first and only playoff appearance for the Birmingham Bulls. The quarterfinals between Houston and Quebec featured the final games of the Houston Aeros (who dissolved in the offseason) along with what ended up being the last postseason overtime game (with Houston and Quebec each winning one in overtime). The defending champion Quebec Nordiques fell in the Semifinal. For the fourth time in franchise history, the Winnipeg Jets advanced to the Avco Cup Final, where they played the New England Whalers, who last made the Avco Cup Final in 1973. The Winnipeg Jets won the Avco Cup over the New England Whalers for their second championship, with Bob Guindon being named WHA Playoffs MVP.

== Playoff seeds ==
The top six teams made the playoffs.

1. Winnipeg Jets, regular season champions – 102 points
2. New England Whalers – 93 points
3. Houston Aeros – 88 points
4. Quebec Nordiques – 83 points
5. Edmonton Oilers – 79 points
6. Birmingham Bulls – 75 points

== Bracket ==
Quarterfinals
2 | New England Whalers | 4
5 | Edmonton Oilers | 1
3 | Houston Aeros | 2
4 | Quebec Nordiques | 4
1 | Winnipeg Jets | 4
6 | Birmingham Bulls | 1

Semifinal
2 | New England Whalers | 4
4 | Quebec Nordiques | 1

Finals
1 | Winnipeg Jets | 4
2 | New England Whalers | 0

== Quarterfinals ==
=== (2) New England Whalers vs. (5) Edmonton Oilers ===
New England had gone 7–3–1 against Edmonton in the regular season. Game 2 saw a litany of penalties, with thirteen players receiving penalties in the first period alone as the Whalers scored two goals in the first period and held the lead the whole way around (curiously, records do not exist about how many people attended the game). Game 4 saw domination by the Whalers, who led 34 seconds into the game to go along with an announcement of the birth of Mark Howe's child that made his father Gordie Howe the first active hockey player to be a grandfather.

| April 14 | Edmonton Oilers | 4–6 (1–1, 0–3, 3–2) | New England Whalers | Springfield Civic Center; Attendance: 6,530 |

Box score
| Don McLeod | Goalies | Jean-Louis Levasseur |
3:07 (1st) – Pierre Jarry; 3:10 (3rd) – Ron Chipperfield; 9:10 (3rd) – Mike Zuke; 16:14 (3rd) – Randy Rota / Goals / 2:53 (1st) – Dave Keon; 1:56 (2nd) – Mike Antonovich; 10:28 (2nd) – Gordie Howe; 14:30 (2nd) – Larry Pleau; 14:46 (3rd) – Marty Howe; 18:09 (3rd) – Mike Antonovich
| 23 (6–4–13) | Shots | 39 (7–15–17) |

| April 16 | Edmonton Oilers | 1–4 (0–2, 0–0, 1–2) | New England Whalers | Springfield Civic Center; Attendance: Unknown |

Box score
| Don McLeod | Goalies | Jean-Louis Levasseur |
9:14 (3rd) – Blair MacDonald / Goals / 4:14 (1st) – Mike Rogers; 5:35 (1st) – John McKenzie; 10:54 (3rd) – Mark Howe; 11:37 (3rd) – Steve Carlson
| 26 (9–10–7) | Shots | 35 (12–9–14) |

| April 19 | New England Whalers | 0–2 (0–1, 0–0, 0–1) | Edmonton Oilers | Northlands Coliseum; Attendance: 11,924 |

Box score
| Jean-Louis Levasseur | Goalies | Don McLeod |
18:48 (1st) – Pierre Guite; 1:56 (3rd) – Mike Zuke / Goals / No scoring
| 19 (6–8–5) | Shots | 28 (9–12–7) |

| April 21 | New England Whalers | 9–1 (4–1, 4–0, 1–0) | Edmonton Oilers | Northlands Coliseum; Attendance: 14,888 |

Box score
| Jean-Louis Levasseur | Goalies | Don McLeod / Dave Dryden |
0:34 (1st) – John McKenzie; 2:04 (1st) – Gordie Howe; 2:49 (1st) – Dave Keon; 13:23 (1st) – Mike Antonovich; 2:03 (2nd) – Steve Carlson; 8:23 (2nd) – Mike Antonovich; 15:04 (2nd) – Mike Antonovich; 18:14 (2nd) – Larry Pleau; 14:49 (3rd) – Danny Bolduc / Goals / 6:55 (1st) – Dennis Sobchuk
| 32 (13–11–8) | Shots | 29 (9–10–10) |

| April 23 | Edmonton Oilers | 1–4 (0–0, 0–1, 1–3) | New England Whalers | Springfield Civic Center; Attendance: 6,212 |

Box score
| Dave Dryden | Goalies | Jean-Louis Levasseur |
7:33 (3rd) – Paul Shmyr / Goals / 18:58 (2nd) – Gordie Howe; 5:28 (3rd) – Mike Antonovich; 19:10 (3rd) – John McKenzie; 19:35 (3rd) – Dave Keon
| 26 (5–10–11) | Shots | 39 (15–13–11) |

=== (3) Houston Aeros vs. (4) Quebec Nordiques ===
The two teams had gone 5–5–1 against each other in the regular season.

Both teams traded victories at the Summit, with Ted Taylor giving Houston the win in Game 1 and Marc Tardif giving Quebec the victory on the only shot taken in overtime in Game 2 (as it turned out, this was the last WHA playoff game to finish in overtime). Houston won Game 5 in what ended up as the last WHA game played in Houston, Texas, with Scott Campbell providing the first goal of a three-goal third period to help the Aeros pull away.

In Game 6, four defensemen scored goals in a rout that saw Real Cloutier tie Larry Lund's postseason record for goals with four in Game 6 (a record which lasted one year) that saw Houston's goaltender pulled after it was 3–0. Quebec eliminated Houston in the last game played by the Aeros prior to the team folding.

| April 16 | Quebec Nordiques | 3–4 (OT) (2–1, 0–0, 1–2, 0–1) | Houston Aeros | The Summit; Attendance: 5,337 |

Box score
| Richard Brodeur | Goalies | Lynn Zimmerman |
5:12 (1st) – Jean Bernier; 16:25 (1st) – Paul Baxter; 0:42 (3rd) – Real Cloutier / Goals / 15:59 (1st) – Andre Lacroix; 0:15 (3rd) – Al McLeod; 15:49 (3rd) – Don Larway; 7:19 (OT) – Ted Taylor
| 35 (19-5-8-3) | Shots | 38 (9-8-18-3) |

| April 18 | Quebec Nordiques | 5–4 (OT) (1–1, 0–0, 3–3, 1–0) | Houston Aeros | The Summit; Attendance: 6,068 |

Box score
| Richard Brodeur | Goalies | Lynn Zimmerman |
8:45 (1st) – Marc Tardif; 15:42 (3rd) – Bob Fitchner; 17:08 (3rd) – Real Cloutier; 18:42 (3rd) – Paul Baxter; 2:59 (OT) – Marc Tardif / Goals / 9:51 (1st) – John Tonelli; 8:15 (3rd) – Andre Lacroix; 11:50 (3rd) – Ron Hansis; 19:19 (3rd) – Morris Lukowich
| 29 (12-6-10-1) | Shots | 31 (10-13-8-0) |

| April 20 | Houston Aeros | 1–5 (0–1, 0–2, 1–2) | Quebec Nordiques | Colisée de Québec; Attendance: 11,593 |

Box score
| Lynn Zimmerman | Goalies | Richard Brodeur |
13:29 (3rd) – John Hughes / Goals / 18:10 (1st) – Steve Sutherland; 13:18 (2nd) – Marc Tardif; 14:47 (2nd) – Norm Dube; 3:38 (3rd) – Francois Lacombe; 8:59 (3rd) – Real Cloutier
| 30 (7–10–13) | Shots | 32 (14–10–8) |

| April 21 | Houston Aeros | 0–3 (0–1, 0–1, 0–1) | Quebec Nordiques | Colisée de Québec; Attendance: 10,851 |

Box score
| Wayne Rutledge | Goalies | Richard Brodeur |
No scoring / Goals / 6:45 (1st) – Serge Bernier; 7:36 (2nd) – Marc Tardif; 14:42 (3rd) – Paulin Bordeleau
| 26 (11–9–6) | Shots | 41 (14–9–18) |

| April 23 | Quebec Nordiques | 2–5 (0–2, 2–1, 0–2) | Houston Aeros | The Summit; Attendance: 5,881 |

Box score
| Richard Brodeur | Goalies | Wayne Rutledge |
11:06 (2nd) – Paulin Bordeleau; 13:26 (2nd) – Paulin Bordeleau / Goals / 14:49 (1st) – Paul Terbenche; 15:36 (1st) – Cam Connor; 8:25 (3rd) – Scott Campbell; 10:33 (3rd) – Ted Taylor; 19:50 (3rd) – Ted Taylor
| 24 (4–14–6) | Shots | 26 (6–5–15) |

| April 26 | Houston Aeros | 2–11 (0–4, 0–2, 2–5) | Quebec Nordiques | Colisée de Québec; Attendance: 11,684 |

Box score
| Lynn Zimmerman / Wayne Rutledge | Goalies | Richard Brodeur |
7:30 (3rd) – Steve West; 15:43 (3rd) – Terry Ruskowski / Goals / 2:56 (1st) – Garry Lariviere; 7:27 (1st) – Curt Brackenbury; 11:23 (1st) – Jean Bernier; 18:23 (1st) – Real Cloutier; 5:50 (2nd) – Wally Weir; 10:40 (2nd) – Real Cloutier; 2:05 (3rd) – Paulin Bordeleau; 2:26 (3rd) – Norm Dube; 7:08 (3rd) – Paul Baxter; 8:21 (3rd) – Real Cloutier; 19:22 (3rd) – Real Cloutier
| 37 (8–13–16) | Shots | 33 (14–9–10) |

=== (1) Winnipeg Jets vs. (6) Birmingham Bulls ===
Winnipeg had gone 6–4–1 against Birmingham in the regular season.

In the decisive Game 5, the Jets set a record for power-play goals in one series (12) with a goal by Anders Hedberg, which ended up being the go-ahead winner.

| April 14 | Birmingham Bulls | 3–9 (1–4, 2–0, 0–5) | Winnipeg Jets | Winnipeg Arena; Attendance: 9,301 |

Box score
| John Garrett | Goalies | Joe Daley / Gary Bromley |
1:15 (1st) – Ken Linseman; 1:51 (2nd) – Frank Beaton; 12:04 (2nd) – Dave Gorman / Goals / 1:48 (1st) – Anders Hedberg; 8:37 (1st) – Mike Amodeo; 10:18 (1st) – Bobby Hull; 16:54 (1st) – Bob Guindon; 8:11 (3rd) – Lyle Moffat; 9:02 (3rd) – Kent Ruhnke; 13:19 (3rd) – Bobby Hull; 16:37 (3rd) – Bob Guindon; 19:51 (3rd) – Anders Hedberg
| 12 (3–4–5) | Shots | 48 (21–13–14) |

| April 16 | Birmingham Bulls | 3–8 (1–3, 2–3, 0–2) | Winnipeg Jets | Winnipeg Arena; Attendance: 10,401 |

Box score
| John Garrett / Wayne Wood | Goalies | Gary Bromley |
10:56 (1st) – Paul Henderson; 12:54 (2nd) – Frank Beaton; 17:18 (2nd) – Frank Mahovlich / Goals / 2:53 (1st) – Dave Kryskow; 5:56 (1st) – Peter Sullivan; 13:41 (1st) – Bobby Hull; 3:24 (2nd) – Kent Ruhnke; 3:33 (2nd) – Dave Kryskow; 11:31 (2nd) – Bobby Hull; 3:18 (3rd) – Bob Guindon; 14:17 (3rd) – Bill Lesuk
| 20 (6–6–8) | Shots | 44 (15–16–13) |

| April 19 | Winnipeg Jets | 2–3 (0–2, 2–1, 0–0) | Birmingham Bulls | Birmingham–Jefferson Civic Center; Attendance: 8,585 |

Box score
| Joe Daley | Goalies | John Garrett |
4:48 (2nd) – Anders Hedberg; 5:24 (2nd) – Bobby Hull / Goals / 1:21 (1st) – Ken Linseman; 5:35 (1st) – Jim Turkiewicz; 16:51 (2nd) – John Stewart
| 21 (5–10–6) | Shots | 35 (11–14–10) |

| April 21 | Winnipeg Jets | 5–1 (2–0, 2–1, 1–0) | Birmingham Bulls | Birmingham–Jefferson Civic Center; Attendance: 12,250 |

Box score
| Gary Bromley | Goalies | John Garrett |
0:37 (1st) – Anders Hedberg; 14:18 (1st) – Dave Kryskow; 13:53 (2nd) – Lyle Moffat; 14:36 (2nd) – Anders Hedberg; 15:06 (3rd) – Bobby Hull / Goals / 10:45 (2nd) – Steve Alley
| 21 (7–6–8) | Shots | 26 (5–7–14) |

| April 23 | Birmingham Bulls | 2–5 (1–2, 0–1, 1–2) | Winnipeg Jets | Winnipeg Arena; Attendance: 9,491 |

Box score
| John Garrett | Goalies | Joe Daley |
7:05 (1st) – Serge Beaudoin; 9:52 (3rd) – Phil Roberto / Goals / 13:27 (1st) – Bill Lesuk; 17:48 (1st) – Mike Ford; 8:25 (2nd) – Anders Hedberg; 0:42 (3rd) – Dave Dunn; 18:51 (3rd) – Bob Guindon
| 18 (7–7–4) | Shots | 37 (17–8–12) |

== Semifinal ==
The top ranked quarterfinal winner (Winnipeg) received a bye into the finals.

=== (2) New England Whalers vs. (4) Quebec Nordiques ===
Quebec had gone 8–4 against New England in the regular season.

| April 28 | Quebec Nordiques | 1–5 (0–2, 0–1, 1–2) | New England Whalers | Springfield Civic Center; Attendance: 7,206 |

Boxscore
| Richard Brodeur / Ken Broderick | Goalies | Jean-Louis Levasseur |
13:24 (3rd) – Garry Lariviere / Goals / 10:30 (1st) – Mark Howe; 5:13 (1st) – Ron Plumb; 12:15 (2nd) – Mike Rogers; 6:00 (3rd) – George Lyle; 6:17 (3rd) – Jack Carlson
| 24 (6–7–11) | Shots | 39 (14–14–11) |

| April 30 | Quebec Nordiques | 3–2 (1–1, 1–0, 1–1) | New England Whalers | Springfield Civic Center; Attendance: 7,448 |

Boxscore
| Richard Brodeur | Goalies | Jean-Louis Levasseur |
12:11 (1st) – Marc Tardif; 6:19 (2nd) – Real Cloutier; 16:23 (3rd) – Steve Sutherland / Goals / 10:23 (1st) – Mike Rogers; 10:09 (3rd) – Danny Bolduc
| 33 (13–15–5) | Shots | 40 (15–7–18) |

| May 3 | New England Whalers | 5–4 (3–0, 1–1, 1–3) | Quebec Nordiques | Colisée de Québec; Attendance: 11,660 |

Box score
| Jean-Louis Levasseur / Al Smith | Goalies | Richard Brodeur / Ken Broderick |
7:08 (1st) – John McKenzie; 10:42 (1st) – Mike Antonovich; 19:20 (1st) – Mark Howe; 6:18 (2nd) – Mike Rogers; 19:10 (3rd) – Larry Pleau / Goals / 9:41 (2nd) – Christian Bordeleau; 1:07 (3rd) – Paul Baxter; 8:42 (3rd) – Serge Bernier; 14:25 (3rd) – Serge Bernier
| 25 (15–6–4) | Shots | 44 (10–19–15) |

| May 5 | New England Whalers | 7–3 (4–2, 2–0, 1–1) | Quebec Nordiques | Colisée de Québec; Attendance: 11,751 |

Box score
| Jean-Louis Levasseur | Goalies | Richard Brodeur |
6:18 (1st) – Al Hangsleben; 12:28 (1st) – Dave Keon; 16:21 (1st) – Mark Howe; 18:04 (1st) – Dave Keon; 6:27 (2nd) – Mike Rogers; 15:23 (2nd) – Mike Antonovich; 0:57 (3rd) – Larry Pleau / Goals / 8:24 (2nd) – Marc Tardif; 10:03 (2nd) – Real Cloutier; 14:43 (3rd) – Alain Cote
| 39 (16–10–13) | Shots | 22 (8–6–8) |

| May 7 | Quebec Nordiques | 3–6 (1–1, 1–3, 1–2) | New England Whalers | Springfield Civic Center; Attendance: 8,125 |

Box score
| Richard Brodeur | Goalies | Jean-Louis Levasseur |
4:49 (1st) – Serge Bernier; 19:18 (2nd) – Jean Bernier; 11:15 (3rd) – Garry Lariviere / Goals / 12:37 (1st) – Mark Howe; 2:54 (2nd) – John McKenzie; 6:23 (2nd) – Mike Antonovich; 12:03 (2nd) – Gordie Howe; 16:12 (3rd) – Mark Howe; 16:40 (3rd) – Mark Howe
| 20 (7–5–8) | Shots | 45 (16–16–13) |

== Avco Cup Final ==
=== (1) Winnipeg Jets vs. (2) New England Whalers ===
The Winnipeg Jets, as coached by Larry Hillman, were matched against the New England Whalers, as coached by Harry Neale. Winnipeg had gone 7–3–1 against New England in the regular season.

Although the Jets had the best record in the league, they did not host the first two games due to the circus being booked at Winnipeg Arena for the opening two dates. The two teams defended each other well in the first two periods of Game 1 (as attended by 8,125 fans) before Winnipeg exploded for four goals in the third period for victory. They dominated Game 2, rocketing to a 4–0 lead after two periods before closing out to a 5–2 victory. Now back home in Winnipeg for Game 3 in front of 10,250 fans, the Jets scored eight goals in the first two periods and shut out the Whalers for 44 minutes before the Whalers scored a couple of goals in a game that ultimately finished with a 10–2 victory for Winnipeg. 10,348 attended Game 4 in Winnipeg. New England scored twice in the opening period of Game 4, but the Jets whittled the lead down with a powerplay goal coming by Dave Kryskow three minutes into the second period. Twelve seconds later, Lyle Moffat found the net to tie the game at two before Anders Hedberg gave Winnipeg the lead with 2:01 remaining in the second period. In the third period, a power-play set up Bobby Hull to deliver what ended up as the series-clinching goal at 3:26 in the third period to make it 4–2 (as it turned out, this was the last postseason goal scored by Hull in his career). George Lyle narrowed the lead to 4–3 with 8:35 remaining, but Anders Hedberg ended the scoring with an empty net goal with 0:32 seconds remaining. It was the final game for Anders Hedberg and Ulf Nilsson with the Jets, as they signed with the New York Rangers to play there for 1978. The two members of the "Hot Line" were asked to skate with the Avco Cup trophy to the Winnipeg crowd after the series ended, which they obliged. The Jets had a parade for their championship down Portage Avenue.

| May 12 | Winnipeg Jets | 4–1 | New England Whalers | Springfield Civic Center | Recap |
| No scoring | | First period | No scoring |
| No scoring | | Second period | No scoring |
| 4:31 – Bob Guindon (Moffat); 4:53 – Peter Sullivan; 13:55 – Bob Guindon (Lesuk); 19:45 – en – Peter Sullivan | | Third period | 8:07 – Larry Pleau (Hangsleben, Bolduc) |
| Gary Bromley 32 saves / 33 shots | | Goalie stats | Jean-Louis Levasseur 26 shots / 29 shots |

| May 14 | Winnipeg Jets | 5–2 | New England Whalers | Springfield Civic Center | Recap |
| 14:02 – Dan Labraaten (Lindstrom); 19:32 – Lyle Moffat (M. Amodeo, B. Lesuk) | | First period | No scoring |
| 1:21 – Bob Guindon (Lesuk, Moffat); 17:10 – Anders Hedberg (U. Nilsson) | | Second period | No scoring |
| 16:35 – Ulf Nilsson (Hedberg) | | Third period | 6:28 – pp – Gordie Howe (Plumb, Rogers); 15:17 – Mark Howe (J. Carlson) |
| Joe Daley 22 saves / 24 shots | | Goalie stats | Jean-Louis Levasseur 22 saves / 27 shots |

| May 19 | New England Whalers | 2–10 | Winnipeg Jets | Winnipeg Arena | Recap |
| No scoring | | First period | 4:56 – pp – Willy Lindstrom; 5:09 – Bob Guindon (Lesuk, Moffat); 6:32 – Bobby Hull (U. Nilsson, Hedberg); 7:31 – Willy Lindstrom (Sullivan, Long); 7:46 – Kent Nilsson (Kryskow, Baird); 17:36 – Kent Nilsson (Lindstrom, Clackson) |
| No scoring | | Second period | 4:55 – Lynn Powis (Kryskow, K. Nilsson); 16:26 – Lyle Moffat (Dunn, Sullivan) |
| 4:07 – John McKenzie (Keon, Marty Howe); 5:19 – Tim Sheehy (Lyle, Selwood) | | Third period | 8:30 – Lynn Powis (K. Nilsson, Kryskow); 12:12 – Willy Lindstrom (Labraaten, Sullivan) |
| Al Smith 23 saves / 33 shots | | Goalie stats | Gary Bromley 28 saves / 30 shots |

| May 22 | New England Whalers | 3–5 | Winnipeg Jets | Winnipeg Arena | Recap |
| 1:37 – Mike Antonovich (Keon, McKenzie); 19:59 – Rick Ley (Sheehy) | | First period | No scoring |
| No scoring | | Second period | 3:26 – pp – Dave Kryskow (Hedberg, K. Nilsson); 3:38 – Lyle Moffat (Guindon); 17:59 – Anders Hedberg (Sjoberg, U. Nilsson) |
| 11:25 – George Lyle (Hangsleben, S. Carlson) | | Third period | 3:26 – pp – Bobby Hull (U. Nilsson, Hedberg); 19:28 – en – Anders Hedberg (U. Nilsson, Green) |
| Al Smith 23 saves / 27 shots | | Goalie stats | Joe Daley 24 saves / 27 shots |

| Winnipeg won series 4–0 |

== Statistical leaders ==
These were the top ten skaters based on points.

| Player | Team | GP | G | A | Pts | + / - | PIM |
|---|---|---|---|---|---|---|---|
| Mike Antonovich | New England Whalers | 14 | 10 | 7 | 17 | 1 | 4 |
| Real Cloutier | Quebec Nordiques | 10 | 9 | 7 | 16 | 0 | 15 |
| Dave Keon | New England Whalers | 14 | 5 | 11 | 16 | 2 | 4 |
| Anders Hedberg | Winnipeg Jets | 9 | 9 | 6 | 15 | 5 | 2 |
| Mark Howe | New England Whalers | 14 | 8 | 7 | 15 | 0 | 18 |
| Marc Tardif | Quebec Nordiques | 11 | 6 | 9 | 15 | -2 | 11 |
| Serge Bernier | Quebec Nordiques | 11 | 4 | 10 | 14 | -1 | 17 |
| Ulf Nilsson | Winnipeg Jets | 9 | 1 | 13 | 14 | 5 | 12 |
| Bob Guindon | Winnipeg Jets | 9 | 8 | 5 | 13 | 9 | 5 |
| John McKenzie | New England Whalers | 14 | 6 | 6 | 12 | -2 | 16 |
| Lyle Moffat | Winnipeg Jets | 9 | 5 | 7 | 12 | 3 | 9 |

== Championship roster ==
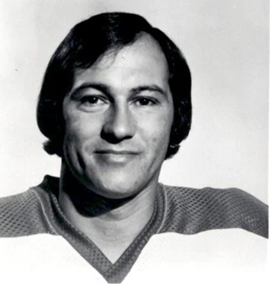
Bob Guindon won the WHA Playoff MVP for Winnipeg.

1977–78 Winnipeg Jets

=== Players ===
Centres

- Lynn Powis
- Peter Sullivan
- Kent Nilsson
- Ulf Nilsson

Wingers

- Dan Labraaten
- Ken Baird
- Bill Lesuk
- Dave Kryskow
- Bobby Hull
- Lyle Moffat
- Bob Guindon
- Kent Ruhnke
- Willy Lindstrom
- Anders Hedberg

Defencemen

- Ted Green
- Kim Clackson
- Dave Dunn
- Lars-Erik Sjoberg (Captain)
- Mike Amodeo
- Mike Ford
- Barry Long

Goaltenders

- Joe Daley
- Gary Bromley

=== Coaching and administrative staff ===
- Larry Hillman (head coach)
- Rudy Pilous (general manager)
