= List of Winnipeg Jets (1979–1996) players =

This is a list of players who played at least one game for the Winnipeg Jets in the National Hockey League (NHL) (1979–1996). For a list of players who played for the Jets in the World Hockey Association, see List of Winnipeg Jets (WHA) players.

== Key ==
- Current Team player.
- Hockey Hall of Famer

Abbreviations
C	Centre
D	Defence
L	Left Wing
R	Right Wing

Goaltenders
W	Wins
L	Losses
T	Ties
SO	Shutouts
GAA	Goals against average
SV%	Save percentage

Skaters
GP	Games played
G	Goals
A	Assists
Pts	Points
PIM	Penalty minutes

The "Seasons" column lists the first year of the season of the player's first game and the last year of the season of the player's last game. For example, a player who played one game in the 2000–2001 season would be listed as playing with the team from 2000–2001, regardless of what calendar year the game occurred within.

== Skaters ==
				Regular season					Playoffs				
Player	Team	Position	Years	GP	G	A	Pts	PIM	GP	G	A	Pts	PIM
Michael Amodeo		D	1979–1980	19	0	0	0	2	—	—	—	—	—
Scott Arniel		L	1981–1991	406	80	112	192	336	18	1	2	3	26
Brent Ashton		L	1988–1992	222	66	95	161	135	7	3	1	4	2
David Babych		D	1980–1986	390	73	248	321	392	18	4	10	14	35
Joel Baillargeon		L	1986–1988	15	0	2	2	27	—	—	—	—	—
Don Barber		L	1990–1992	27	1	5	6	18	—	—	—	—	—
Stu Barnes		C	1991–1994	102	25	23	48	44	6	1	3	4	2
Sergei Bautin		D	1992–1994	130	5	25	30	174	6	0	0	0	2
Sandy Beadle		L	1980–1981	6	1	0	1	2	—	—	—	—	—
Brad Berry		D	1985–1990	163	4	25	29	196	11	0	1	1	14
John Bethel		L	1979–1980	17	0	2	2	4	—	—	—	—	—
Thomas Bladon		D	1980–1981	9	0	5	5	10	—	—	—	—	—
Matthew Block		D	1988–1989	2	0	0	0	4	—	—	—	—	—
Arto Blomsten		D	1993–1995	19	0	2	2	8	—	—	—	—	—
Luciano Borsato		C	1990–1995	203	35	55	90	113	7	1	0	1	4
Laurie Boschman		C	1982–1990	526	152	227	379	1,338	34	5	10	15	87
Paul Boutilier		D	1987–1989	9	0	0	0	10	5	0	0	0	15
Richard Bowness		R	1980–1981	45	8	17	25	45	1	0	0	0	0
Darren Boyko		C	1988–1989	1	0	0	0	0	—	—	—	—	—
Andy Brickley		L	1992–1994	14	0	2	2	2	1	1	1	2	0
Aaron Broten		C	1991–1992	25	4	5	9	14	7	2	2	4	12
Greg Brown		D	1994–1995	9	0	3	3	17	—	—	—	—	—
Jerry Butler		R	1982–1983	42	3	6	9	14	—	—	—	—	—
Alan Cameron		D	1979–1981	92	4	13	17	93	—	—	—	—	—
Scott Campbell		D	1979–1981	77	4	21	25	191	—	—	—	—	—
Wade Campbell		D	1982–1986	185	9	23	32	245	6	0	0	0	9
Randy Carlyle		D	1983–1993	564	80	226	306	736	31	3	14	17	51
Dave Chartier		C	1980–1981	1	0	0	0	0	—	—	—	—	—
Denis Chasse		R	1995–1996	15	0	0	0	12	—	—	—	—	—
Dave Christian		R	1979–1983	230	79	130	209	75	7	0	1	1	2
Jason Cirone		C	1991–1992	3	0	0	0	2	—	—	—	—	—
Danton Cole		R	1989–1992	120	21	17	38	56	—	—	—	—	—
Keith Cory		D	1979–1981	51	2	10	12	41	—	—	—	—	—
Shawn Cronin		D	1989–1992	193	1	13	14	703	9	0	0	0	13
Randy Cunneyworth		L	1989–1990	28	5	6	11	34	—	—	—	—	—
Patrick Daley		L	1979–1981	12	1	0	1	13	—	—	—	—	—
Evgeny Davydov		R	1991–1993	91	32	24	56	74	11	2	2	4	2
Lucien DeBlois		C	1981–1992	235	87	101	188	208	15	3	2	5	15
William Derlago		C	1985–1987	57	8	11	19	18	3	1	0	1	0
Wayne Dillon		C	1979–1980	13	0	0	0	2	—	—	—	—	—
Shane Doan		R	1995–1996	74	7	10	17	101	6	0	0	0	6
Jason Doig		D	1995–1996	15	1	1	2	28	—	—	—	—	—
Bob Dollas		D	1983–1986	55	0	5	5	66	3	0	0	0	2
Tie Domi		R	1992–1995	161	15	25	40	724	6	1	0	1	23
Gordon Donnelly		D	1988–1992	173	12	17	29	726	6	0	1	1	8
Jordy Douglas		L	1983–1985	24	4	4	8	8	1	0	0	0	2
Peter Douris		R	1985–1988	21	0	2	2	0	1	0	0	0	0
Dallas Drake		R	1993–1996	127	30	43	73	78	3	0	0	0	0
Kris Draper		C	1990–1993	20	3	0	3	9	2	0	0	0	0
Jude Drouin		C	1979–1981	85	8	16	24	54	—	—	—	—	—
John Druce		R	1992–1993	50	6	14	20	37	2	0	0	0	0
Richard Dudley		L	1980–1981	30	5	5	10	28	—	—	—	—	—
Iain Duncan		L	1986–1991	127	34	55	89	149	11	0	3	3	6
Craig Duncanson		R	1990–1991	7	2	0	2	16	—	—	—	—	—
Normand Dupont		L	1980–1983	181	47	67	114	36	5	3	1	4	0
Michael Eagles		L	1990–1995	293	21	46	67	464	12	0	1	1	14
Dallas Eakins		D	1992–1996	16	0	2	2	38	—	—	—	—	—
Mike Eastwood		C	1994–1996	93	17	20	37	24	6	0	1	1	2
Murray Eaves		C	1980–1986	49	4	12	16	7	4	0	1	1	2
David Ellett		D	1984–1991	475	95	204	299	504	33	4	16	20	22
Pat Elynuik		R	1987–1992	289	115	129	244	262	14	4	6	10	6
Nelson Emerson		R	1993–1995	131	47	64	111	106	—	—	—	—	—
Craig Endean		L	1986–1987	2	0	1	1	0	—	—	—	—	—
Bryan Erickson		C	1990–1994	73	6	23	29	20	3	0	0	0	0
Douglas Evans		L	1989–1992	127	24	42	66	209	8	2	2	4	12
Anatoli Fedotov		D	1992–1993	1	0	2	2	0	—	—	—	—	—
Paul Fenton		L	1988–1991	156	50	31	81	91	7	2	0	2	23
Jeff Finley		D	1995–1996	65	1	5	6	81	6	0	0	0	4
Craig Fisher		C	1993–1994	4	0	0	0	2	—	—	—	—	—
Steven Fletcher		D	1988–1989	3	0	0	0	5	—	—	—	—	—
Todd Flichel		D	1987–1990	6	0	1	1	4	—	—	—	—	—
Iain Fraser		C	1995–1996	12	1	1	2	4	4	0	0	0	0
Daniel Geoffrion		R	1980–1982	79	20	26	46	87	—	—	—	—	—
John Gibson		C	1983–1984	11	0	0	0	14	—	—	—	—	—
Randy Gilhen		C	1986–1996	185	18	17	35	151	4	1	0	1	10
Guy Gosselin		D	1987–1988	5	0	0	0	6	—	—	—	—	—
Hilliard Graves		R	1979–1980	35	1	5	6	15	—	—	—	—	—
Michal Grosek		L	1993–1996	28	3	2	5	21	—	—	—	—	—
Robert Guindon		C	1979–1980	6	0	1	1	0	—	—	—	—	—
Ravil Gusmanov		R	1995–1996	4	0	0	0	0	—	—	—	—	—
Gilles Hamel		L	1986–1989	143	35	32	67	59	9	2	0	2	2
Tavis Hansen		R	1994–1995	1	0	0	0	0	—	—	—	—	—
Mike Hartman		L	1991–1992	75	4	4	8	264	2	0	0	0	2
Dale Hawerchuk (2001)		C	1981–1990	713	379	550	929	478	38	16	33	49	39
Matt Hervey		D	1988–1989	2	0	0	0	4	—	—	—	—	—
Larry Hopkins		L	1979–1983	58	13	16	29	26	6	0	0	0	2
Phil Housley (2015)		D	1990–1993	232	64	195	259	168	13	1	11	12	2
David Hoyda		L	1979–1981	24	2	1	3	42	—	—	—	—	—
Brent Hughes		L	1988–1990	39	4	4	8	115	—	—	—	—	—
Bobby Hull (1983)		L	1979–1980	18	4	6	10	0	—	—	—	—	—
David Hunter		L	1988–1989	34	3	1	4	61	—	—	—	—	—
Craig Janney		C	1995–1996	13	7	13	20	0	6	1	2	3	0
Hannu Jarvenpaa		R	1986–1989	114	11	26	37	83	—	—	—	—	—
Bradley Jones		L	1986–1990	47	9	10	19	21	1	0	0	0	0
Tony Joseph		R	1988–1989	2	1	0	1	0	—	—	—	—	—
Robert Joyce		L	1991–1993	2	0	0	0	0	—	—	—	—	—
Yan Kaminsky		L	1993–1994	1	0	0	0	0	—	—	—	—	—
Dean Kennedy		D	1991–1994	172	5	19	24	290	8	0	0	0	2
Alan Kerr		R	1992–1993	7	0	1	1	2	—	—	—	—	—
Sergei Kharin		R	1990–1991	7	2	3	5	2	—	—	—	—	—
Chad Kilger		L	1995–1996	29	2	3	5	12	4	1	0	1	0
Kris King		L	1992–1996	260	25	29	54	577	11	1	2	3	8
Igor Korolev		C	1994–1996	118	30	51	81	52	6	0	3	3	0
Stu Kulak		R	1988–1989	18	2	0	2	24	—	—	—	—	—
Mark Kumpel		R	1987–1991	141	19	16	35	50	11	2	0	2	6
Markku Kyllonen		R	1988–1989	9	0	2	2	2	—	—	—	—	—
James Kyte		D	1982–1989	399	11	25	36	772	24	0	4	4	73
Michael Lalor		D	1991–1993	79	3	11	14	90	11	0	2	2	23
Guy Larose		C	1988–1991	10	0	1	1	14	—	—	—	—	—
Michael Lauen		R	1983–1984	4	0	1	1	0	—	—	—	—	—
John Leblanc		R	1991–1995	38	12	3	15	10	—	—	—	—	—
Douglas Lecuyer		L	1980–1981	45	6	17	23	66	—	—	—	—	—
Barry Legge		D	1980–1982	76	1	8	9	126	—	—	—	—	—
Maurice Lemay		L	1988–1989	10	1	0	1	14	—	—	—	—	—
William Lesuk		R	1979–1980	49	0	1	1	43	—	—	—	—	—
Craig Levie		D	1981–1983	62	8	14	22	79	—	—	—	—	—
Scott Levins		R	1992–1993	9	0	1	1	18	—	—	—	—	—
Willy Lindstrom		R	1979–1983	288	97	91	188	106	4	2	1	3	2
Barry Long		D	1980–1982	70	6	19	25	46	—	—	—	—	—
Morris Lukowich		L	1979–1985	431	168	177	345	438	7	0	2	2	16
Bengt Lundholm		L	1981–1986	275	48	95	143	72	14	3	4	7	14
Paul MacDermid		R	1989–1992	172	32	42	74	379	7	0	2	2	8
Donald Maciver		D	1979–1980	6	0	0	0	2	—	—	—	—	—
Norm MacIver		D	1995–1996	39	5	25	30	26	6	1	0	1	2
Paul MacLean		R	1981–1988	527	248	270	518	726	35	16	10	26	82
Stewart Malgunas		D	1995–1996	29	0	1	1	32	—	—	—	—	—
Kris Manery		R	1979–1981	63	19	13	32	30	—	—	—	—	—
James Mann		R	1979–1984	202	9	12	21	598	4	0	0	0	7
Dave Manson		D	1993–1996	139	11	42	53	395	6	2	1	3	30
Maurice Mantha		D	1980–1992	318	31	125	156	203	16	5	10	15	18
Bryan Marchment		D	1988–1991	37	2	4	6	121	—	—	—	—	—
John Markell		L	1979–1981	52	11	10	21	36	—	—	—	—	—
Mario Marois		D	1985–1992	255	17	116	133	378	18	2	11	13	35
Peter Marsh		R	1979–1981	81	24	27	51	68	—	—	—	—	—
Craig Martin		R	1994–1995	20	0	1	1	19	—	—	—	—	—
Tom Martin		L	1984–1987	24	2	0	2	91	3	0	0	0	2
Bryan Maxwell		D	1981–1984	102	8	25	33	268	3	1	0	1	23
Andrew McBain		R	1983–1989	408	101	129	230	421	24	5	7	12	39
Wayne McBean		D	1993–1994	31	2	9	11	24	—	—	—	—	—
Kevin McClelland		R	1993–1994	6	0	0	0	19	—	—	—	—	—
Dan McFall		D	1984–1986	9	0	1	1	0	—	—	—	—	—
Jim McKenzie		L	1995–1996	73	4	2	6	202	1	0	0	0	2
Dave McLlwain		C	1989–1992	143	40	38	78	108	7	0	1	1	2
Brian McReynolds		C	1989–1990	9	0	2	2	4	—	—	—	—	—
Gord McTavish		C	1979–1980	10	1	3	4	2	—	—	—	—	—
Anssi Melametsa		R	1985–1986	27	0	3	3	2	—	—	—	—	—
Barry Melrose		D	1979–1981	92	5	7	12	164	—	—	—	—	—
Oleg Mikulchik		D	1993–1995	29	0	3	3	29	—	—	—	—	—
Craig Mills		R	1995–1996	4	0	2	2	0	1	0	0	0	0
Boris Mironov		D	1993–1994	65	7	22	29	96	—	—	—	—	—
Lyle Moffatt		L	1979–1980	74	10	9	19	38	—	—	—	—	—
Richard Mulhern		D	1980–1981	19	0	4	4	14	—	—	—	—	—
Brian Mullen		R	1982–1987	372	124	172	296	132	26	7	9	16	16
Craig Muni		D	1995–1996	25	1	3	4	37	6	0	1	1	2
Rob Murray		C	1991–1996	36	1	3	4	30	—	—	—	—	—
Troy Murray		C	1991–1993	103	20	34	54	103	7	0	0	0	2
Raymond Neufeld		R	1985–1989	249	61	66	127	388	16	5	3	8	46
James Nill		R	1984–1988	141	17	21	38	209	14	0	1	1	39
Craig Norwich		D	1979–1980	70	10	35	45	36	—	—	—	—	—
Teppo Numminen		D	1988–1996	547	53	212	265	215	26	2	3	5	14
Fredrik Olausson		D	1986–1994	496	86	249	335	198	35	4	13	17	12
Eddie Olczyk		R	1990–1996	214	95	106	201	235	12	3	3	6	10
Mark Osborne		L	1990–1992	80	12	20	32	124	—	—	—	—	—
Mark Osiecki		D	1992–1993	4	1	0	1	2	—	—	—	—	—
Gregory Paslawski		R	1989–1991	114	27	40	67	24	7	1	3	4	0
Kent Paynter		D	1991–1992	5	0	0	0	4	—	—	—	—	—
Robert Picard		D	1983–1986	160	20	43	63	158	11	2	2	4	20
Mark Plantery		D	1980–1981	25	1	5	6	14	—	—	—	—	—
Rudy Poeschek		D	1990–1992	5	0	0	0	22	—	—	—	—	—
Paul Pooley		C	1984–1986	15	0	3	3	0	—	—	—	—	—
Deron Quint		D	1995–1996	51	5	13	18	22	—	—	—	—	—
Stephane Quintal		D	1993–1995	124	14	35	49	197	—	—	—	—	—
Bill Riley		R	1979–1980	14	3	2	5	7	—	—	—	—	—
Gerry Rioux		R	1979–1980	8	0	0	0	6	—	—	—	—	—
Russell Romaniuk		L	1991–1995	85	10	14	24	46	1	0	0	0	0
Edward Ronan		R	1995–1996	17	0	0	0	16	—	—	—	—	—
Steve Rooney		C	1986–1988	86	9	9	18	274	13	1	0	1	67
Serge Savard (1986)		D	1981–1983	123	6	21	27	55	7	0	0	0	4
Dwight Schofield		D	1987–1988	18	0	0	0	33	—	—	—	—	—
Teemu Selanne (2017)		R	1992–1996	231	147	159	306	87	6	4	2	6	2
Jyrki Seppa		D	1983–1984	13	0	2	2	6	—	—	—	—	—
Darrin Shannon		L	1991–1996	311	64	124	188	261	19	3	5	8	22
Darryl Shannon		D	1993–1996	108	7	20	27	138	—	—	—	—	—
Dave Silk		R	1985–1986	32	2	4	6	63	1	0	0	0	2
Lars Sjoberg		D	1979–1980	79	7	27	34	48	—	—	—	—	—
Petri Skriko		L	1991–1992	15	2	3	5	4	—	—	—	—	—
Douglas Smail		L	1980–1991	691	189	208	397	466	41	9	2	11	49
Gordon Smith		D	1979–1980	13	0	0	0	8	—	—	—	—	—
Donald Spring		D	1980–1984	259	1	54	55	80	6	0	0	0	10
Lorne Stamler		L	1979–1980	62	8	7	15	12	—	—	—	—	—
Mike Stapleton		C	1995–1996	58	10	14	24	37	6	0	0	0	21
Anders Steen		C	1980–1981	42	5	11	16	22	—	—	—	—	—
Thomas Steen		C	1981–1995	950	264	553	817	753	56	12	32	44	62
Ryan Stewart		C	1985–1986	3	1	0	1	0	—	—	—	—	—
Peter Sullivan		C	1979–1981	126	28	54	82	40	—	—	—	—	—
Phillip Sykes		L	1989–1992	170	25	18	43	157	11	0	1	1	9
Peter Taglianetti		D	1984–1990	207	10	37	47	604	14	1	1	2	20
Brent Thompson		D	1994–1996	39	0	1	1	99	—	—	—	—	—
Keith Tkachuk (2026)		L	1991–1996	308	144	145	289	792	19	8	2	10	66
Glenn Tomalty		C	1979–1980	1	0	0	0	0	—	—	—	—	—
David Tomlinson		C	1993–1994	31	1	3	4	24	—	—	—	—	—
Timothy Trimper		L	1980–1984	140	23	22	45	128	1	0	0	0	0
Alfie Turcotte		C	1987–1989	17	1	3	4	2	—	—	—	—	—
Darren Turcotte		C	1995–1996	59	16	16	32	26	—	—	—	—	—
Perry Turnbull		C	1984–1987	172	43	57	100	357	12	0	2	2	47
Oleg Tverdovsky		D	1995–1996	31	0	8	8	6	6	0	1	1	0
Igor Ulanov		D	1991–1995	176	5	43	48	383	11	0	0	0	43
Mark Visheau		D	1993–1994	1	0	0	0	0	—	—	—	—	—
Harije Vitolinish		C	1993–1994	8	0	0	0	4	—	—	—	—	—
Timothy Watters		D	1981–1988	438	21	101	122	760	32	1	2	3	53
Simon Wheeldon		C	1990–1991	4	0	0	0	4	—	—	—	—	—
William Whelton		D	1980–1981	2	0	0	0	0	—	—	—	—	—
Neil Wilkinson		D	1994–1996	61	2	8	10	108	—	—	—	—	—
Ronald Wilson		C	1979–1988	536	75	134	209	236	23	7	6	13	6
Timothy Young		C	1983–1984	44	15	19	34	25	1	0	1	1	0
Paul Ysebaert		L	1993–1994	60	9	18	27	18	—	—	—	—	—
Alexei Zhamnov		C	1992–1996	235	103	164	267	205	12	2	3	5	10

== Goaltenders ==
			Regular season							Playoffs					
Player	Team	Years	GP	W	L	T	SO	GAA	SV%	GP	W	L	SO	GAA	SV%
Stephane Beauregard		1989–1994	74	16	30	11	2	3.48	0.885	4	1	3	0	3.02	0.886
Marc Behrend		1983–1986	39	12	19	3	1	4.82	—	7	1	3	0	3.65	0.000
Daniel Berthiaume		1985–1990	120	50	45	13	4	3.63	—	14	5	9	0	3.72	0.000
Daniel Bouchard		1985–1986	32	11	14	2	2	3.79	—	1	0	1	0	7.50	0.000
Tim Cheveldae		1993–1996	74	21	42	7	1	3.85	0.884	—	—	—	—	—	—
Alain Chevrier		1988–1989	22	8	8	2	1	4.29	0.859	—	—	—	—	—	—
Michel Dion		1980–1981	14	3	6	3	0	4.83	—	—	—	—	—	—	—
Thomas Draper		1988–1996	9	3	5	0	0	4.80	0.823	—	—	—	—	—	—
Bob Essensa		1988–1994	281	116	114	32	14	3.38	0.894	11	4	5	0	3.47	0.883
Pierre Hamel		1979–1981	64	12	39	7	0	4.34	—	—	—	—	—	—	—
Brian Hayward		1982–1986	165	63	75	16	1	4.27	—	11	2	8	0	4.80	0.000
Mark Holden		1984–1985	4	2	0	0	0	4.23	—	—	—	—	—	—	—
Jim Hrivnak		1992–1993	3	2	1	0	0	4.34	0.865	—	—	—	—	—	—
Nikolai Khabibulin		1994–1996	79	34	29	7	2	3.22	0.904	6	2	4	0	3.17	0.911
Scott Langkow		1995–1996	1	0	0	0	0	0.00	1.000	—	—	—	—	—	—
Ronald Loustel		1980–1981	1	0	1	0	0	10.00	—	—	—	—	—	—	—
Markus Mattsson		1979–1981	52	8	32	8	3	3.98	—	—	—	—	—	—	—
Lindsay Middlebrook		1979–1981	24	2	17	3	0	5.11	—	—	—	—	—	—	—
Michael O'Neill		1991–1994	20	0	9	2	0	4.22	0.863	—	—	—	—	—	—
Steven Penney		1986–1988	15	3	8	2	0	4.64	—	—	—	—	—	—	—
Eldon Reddick		1986–1989	117	41	51	14	0	3.73	—	3	0	2	0	3.61	0.000
Dominic Roussel		1995–1996	7	2	2	0	0	3.37	0.881	—	—	—	—	—	—
Gary Smith		1979–1980	20	4	11	4	0	4.08	—	—	—	—	—	—	—
Doug Soetaert		1981–1984	130	50	48	21	2	4.24	—	4	1	2	0	4.87	0.000
Edward Staniowski		1981–1984	63	24	27	6	2	4.22	—	2	0	2	0	6.00	0.000
Richard Tabaracci		1990–1993	61	15	26	7	1	3.84	0.874	7	3	4	0	4.03	0.877
Michael Veisor		1983–1984	8	4	1	2	0	3.71	—	1	0	0	0	6.00	0.000

== See also ==
- List of NHL players
