= Floyd Hillman =

Canadian ice hockey player (1933–2020)

- Born: November 19, 1933 Ruthven, Ontario, Canada
- Died: May 26, 2020 (aged 86) Ontario, Canada
- Height: 5 ft 11 in (180 cm)
- Weight: 180 lb (82 kg; 12 st 12 lb)
- Position: Defence
- Shot: Left
- Played for: Boston Bruins
- Playing career: 1954–1964

Floyd Arthur "Bud" Hillman (November 19, 1933 – May 26, 2020) was a Canadian professional ice hockey player who played six games in the National Hockey League (NHL) for the Boston Bruins during the 1956–57 season. The rest of his career, which lasted from 1954 to 1964, was spent in various minor leagues.

He was the brother of two other NHL players: Larry Hillman and Wayne Hillman. He is also the uncle of Brian Savage.

== Career statistics ==
=== Regular season and playoffs ===
			Regular season					Playoffs
Season	Team	League	GP	G	A	Pts	PIM	GP	G	A	Pts	PIM
1950–51	Ottawa Chevies	OHA B	—	—	—	—	—	—	—	—	—	—
1950–51	Oshawa Generals	OHA	1	0	0	0	4	—	—	—	—	—
1951–52	Ottawa Chevies	OHA B	—	—	—	—	—	—	—	—	—	—
1952–53	Oshawa Generals	OHA	56	7	13	20	94	4	1	0	1	4
1953–54	Kitchener Greenshirts	OHA	55	3	16	19	115	4	0	0	0	8
1954–55	Windsor Bulldogs	OHA Sr	46	2	10	12	131	12	1	3	4	27
1955–56	Victoria Cougars	WHL	30	2	4	6	69	—	—	—	—	—
1955–56	Hershey Bears	AHL	41	1	6	7	70	—	—	—	—	—
1956–57	Boston Bruins	NHL	6	0	0	0	10	—	—	—	—	—
1956–57	Quebec Aces	QHL	62	4	8	12	140	10	0	2	2	14
1957–58	Quebec Aces	QHL	23	0	5	5	49	13	0	2	2	15
1957–58	Springfield Indians	AHL	43	3	11	14	62	—	—	—	—	—
1958–59	Providence Reds	AHL	2	0	0	0	0	—	—	—	—	—
1958–59	Quebec Aces	AHL	59	1	18	19	149	—	—	—	—	—
1959–60	Providence Reds	AHL	72	4	27	31	132	5	0	1	1	10
1960–61	Providence Reds	AHL	39	0	8	8	53	—	—	—	—	—
1960–61	Kingston Frontenacs	EPHL	18	0	1	1	27	—	—	—	—	—
1961–62	San Francisco Seals	WHL	70	0	14	14	122	2	0	1	1	7
1962–63	Windsor Bulldogs	OHA Sr	33	3	20	23	72	11	0	2	2	27
1962–63	Windsor Bulldogs	Al-Cup	—	—	—	—	—	13	0	3	3	26
1963–64	Windsor Bulldogs	IHL	68	4	22	26	180	6	0	2	2	8
AHL totals			197	8	52	60	317	5	0	1	1	10
NHL totals			6	0	0	0	0	—	—	—	—	—
