= Lynn Zimmerman =

Canadian ice hockey player

- Born: July 13, 1942 (age 83) Fort Erie, Ontario, Canada
- Height: 5 ft 8 in (173 cm)
- Weight: 155 lb (70 kg; 11 st 1 lb)
- Position: Goaltender
- Caught: Right
- Played for: WHA; Denver Spurs; Ottawa Civics; Houston Aeros; EHL; Charlotte Checkers; Johnstown Jets; CPHL; Memphis South Stars; Denver Spurs; AHL; Rochester Americans; Baltimore Clippers; Philadelphia Firebirds; WHL; Vancouver Canucks; NAHL; Erie Blades
- NHL draft: Undrafted
- Playing career: 1968–1978

Lynn Brian Zimmerman (born July 13, 1942) is a Canadian former professional ice hockey goaltender.

== Career ==
Zimmerman won a Calder Cup as a member of the Rochester Americans in the 1967–1968 season and the Lester Patrick Cup as a member of the Vancouver Canucks during the 1969–1970 season. During the 1975–76 season, Zimmerman played eight games in the World Hockey Association (WHA) with the Denver Spurs/Ottawa Civics, and during the 1977–78 season he played another 20 WHA games with the Houston Aeros. He played the net for the final Aeros game in history in the 1978 WHA playoffs on April 26, 1978.

== Career statistics ==
=== Regular season and playoffs ===
			Regular season									Playoffs
Season	Team	League	GP	W	L	T	MIN	GA	SO	GAA	SV%	GP	W	L	MIN	GA	SO	GAA	SV%
1966–67	Charlotte Checkers	EHL	72	–	–	–	–	230	3	3.19	–	–	–	–	–	–	–	–	–
1967–68	Rochester Americans	AHL	13	–	–	–	584	40	1	4.19	–	–	–	–	–	–	–	–	–
1967–68	Memphis South Stars	CPHL	19	9	17	7	1099	59	2	3.19	.907	3	–	–	–	–	–	–	–
1968–69	Rochester Americans	AHL	11	–	–	–	533	48	0	5.40	–	–	–	–	–	–	–	–	–
1968–69	Johnstown Jets	EHL	35	23	8	3	2046	90	4	2.64	–	–	–	–	–	–	–	–	–
1969–70	Vancouver Canucks	WHL	13	–	–	–	761	48	0	3.78	–	1	–	–	–	–	–	–	–
1970–71	Rochester Americans	AHL	25	–	–	–	1288	81	0	3.77	–	–	–	–	–	–	–	–	–
1971–72	Rochester Americans	AHL	42	–	–	–	2179	127	1	3.50	–	–	–	–	–	–	–	–	–
1972–73	Rochester Americans	AHL	58	–	–	–	3264	192	2	3.54	–	5	–	–	–	–	–	–	–
1973–74	Rochester Americans	AHL	46	27	12	7	2746	133	1	2.90	–	4	–	–	–	–	–	–	–
1974–75	Baltimore Clippers	AHL	40	14	17	8	2298	136	3	3.55	.899	–	–	–	–	–	–	–	–
1974–75	Denver Spurs	CHL	8	3	4	0	457	29	0	3.81	–	2	–	–	–	–	–	–	–
1975–76	Erie Blades	NAHL	53	30	20	0	3052	179	2	3.52	–	5	2	3	280	24	1	5.14	–
1975–76	Denver Spurs/Ottawa Civics	WHA	8	2	6	0	495	31	0	3.76	.897	–	–	–	–	–	–	–	–
1976–77	Erie Blades	NAHL	61	32	26	2	3590	202	2	3.38	.900	–	–	–	–	–	–	–	–
1977–78	Philadelphia Firebirds	AHL	2	1	0	1	125	6	0	2.88	.898	–	–	–	–	–	–	–	–
1977–78	Houston Aeros	WHA	20	10	9	0	1166	84	0	4.32	.869	4	1	2	239	21	0	5.27
WHA totals			28	12	15	0	1661	115	0	4.15	.878	4	1	2	239	21	0	5.27
