= Brian Savage =

Canadian ice hockey player (born 1971)

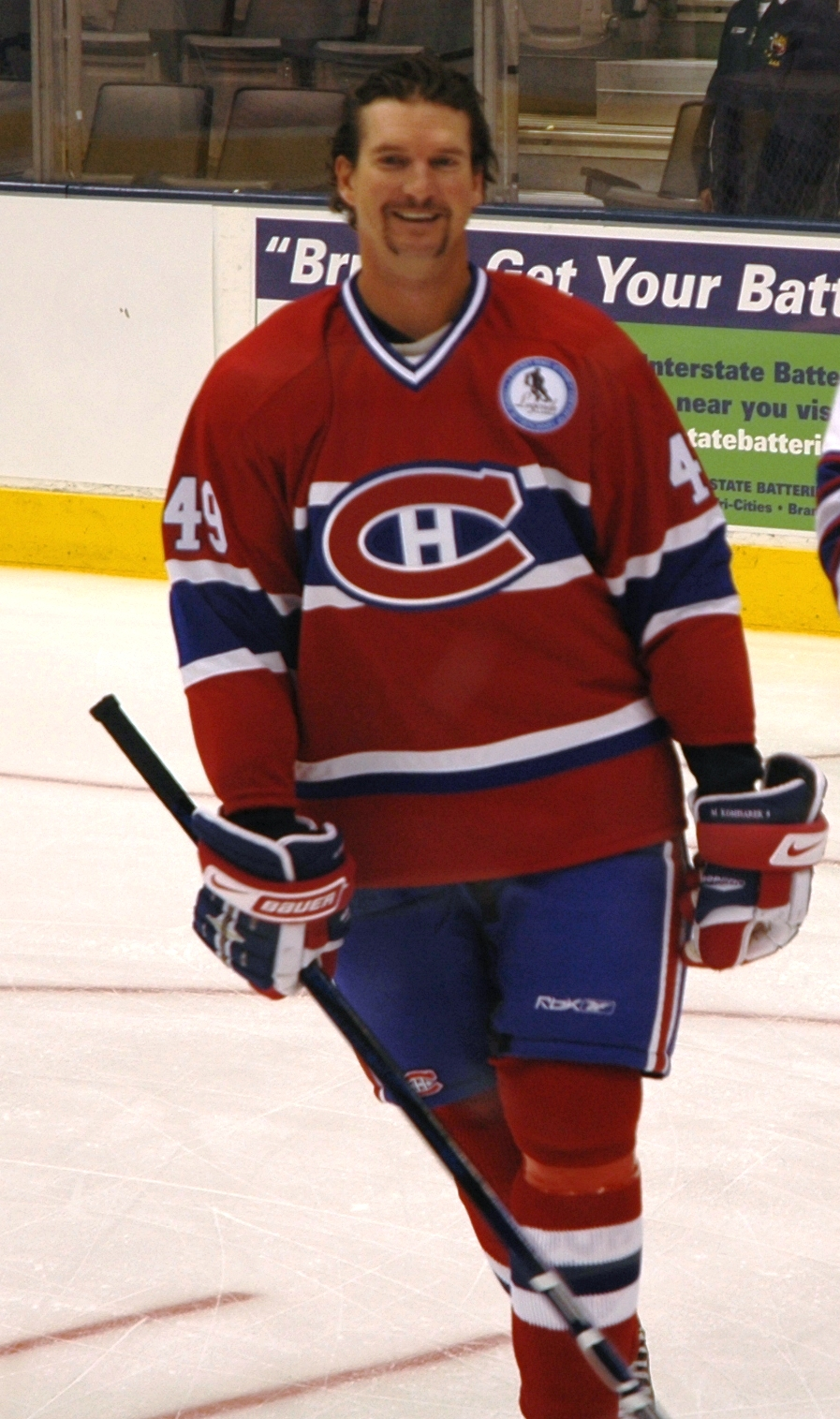
- Born: February 24, 1971 (age 55) Sudbury, Ontario, Canada
- Height: 6 ft 2 in (188 cm)
- Weight: 192 lb (87 kg; 13 st 10 lb)
- Position: Left wing
- Shot: Left
- Played for: Montreal Canadiens; Phoenix Coyotes; St. Louis Blues; Philadelphia Flyers
- National team: Canada
- NHL draft: 171st overall, 1991; Montreal Canadiens
- Playing career: 1993–2006

Brian Arthur Savage (born February 24, 1971) is a Canadian former professional ice hockey left winger who played twelve seasons in the National Hockey League (NHL) for the Montreal Canadiens, Phoenix Coyotes, St. Louis Blues and Philadelphia Flyers.

== Playing career ==
Savage attended Lo-Ellen Park Secondary School in Sudbury as a teenager. He was a proficient golfer and track athlete. He played one season with the Sudbury Cubs of the Northern Ontario Junior Hockey League before jumping to college.

The nephew of former NHL players Larry, Wayne and Floyd Hillman. Savage was originally drafted in 1991 in the 8th round, 171st overall by the Montreal Canadiens. After completing his college hockey career at Miami University, he began his professional career with the Fredericton Canadiens of the AHL in 1993. His first taste of the National Hockey League came at the tail end of the 1993–94 season, playing in 3 regular season and 3 playoff games.

Savage was the first Montreal Canadien since Joe Malone in 1917 to record six points in a road game when he had four goals and two assists against the Islanders on April 8, 1999. He also recorded the Canadiens' first hat trick in Bell Centre history on October 7, 1996. After several fast starts in the month of October and subsequently fading the rest of those seasons, Savage became known as hockey's "Mr. October".

After parts of eight seasons with the Canadiens, Savage was traded to the Phoenix Coyotes on January 25, 2002, along with a 2002 3rd-round pick for Sergei Berezin. On December 27, 2003, he scored the first Coyote goal in Jobing.com Arena. He was soon after traded to the St. Louis Blues for their playoff run. Due to the parameters of the trade, he was claimed off waivers by Phoenix in the off-season.

Following the 2004–05 NHL lockout, Phoenix bought out his contract for $1.9 million. Savage signed a one-year deal with the Philadelphia Flyers prior to the 2005–06 NHL season. After one season in Philadelphia, Savage announced his retirement on September 21, 2006.

Savage was the co-owner of the now defunct New Mexico Scorpions of the Central Hockey League while he was playing for the Flyers.

== Personal life ==
Savage's son, Redmond, was drafted in the fourth round, 114th overall, by the Detroit Red Wings in the 2021 NHL entry draft and is currently a member of the Buffalo Sabres organization. He has a third son named Rory Savage. Rory is signed as a St. Thomas Star for the 25-26 GOHL hockey season in Ontario, Canada.

== Awards and honours ==
Award	Year
All-CCHA First Team	1992-93
CCHA Player of the Year	1992-93
AHCA West Second-Team All-American	1992–93
Silver medal Canadian Olympic Team	1994 Winter Olympics

== Career statistics ==
=== Regular season and playoffs ===
			Regular season					Playoffs
Season	Team	League	GP	G	A	Pts	PIM	GP	G	A	Pts	PIM
1988–89	Lo-Ellen Park Secondary School	HS-ON	—	—	—	—	—	—	—	—	—	—
1989–90	Sudbury Cubs	NOJHL	32	45	40	85	61	8	11	14	25	26
1990–91	Miami University	CCHA	28	5	6	11	26	—	—	—	—	—
1991–92	Miami University	CCHA	40	24	16	40	43	—	—	—	—	—
1992–93	Miami University	CCHA	38	37	21	58	44	—	—	—	—	—
1992–93	Canada	Intl	9	3	0	3	12	—	—	—	—	—
1993–94	Canada	Intl	51	20	26	46	38	—	—	—	—	—
1993–94	Fredericton Canadiens	AHL	17	12	15	27	4	—	—	—	—	—
1993–94	Montreal Canadiens	NHL	3	1	0	1	0	3	0	2	2	0
1994–95	Montreal Canadiens	NHL	37	12	7	19	27	—	—	—	—	—
1995–96	Montreal Canadiens	NHL	75	25	8	33	28	6	0	2	2	2
1996–97	Montreal Canadiens	NHL	81	23	37	60	39	5	1	1	2	0
1997–98	Montreal Canadiens	NHL	64	26	17	43	36	9	0	2	2	6
1998–99	Montreal Canadiens	NHL	54	16	10	26	20	—	—	—	—	—
1999–00	Montreal Canadiens	NHL	38	17	12	29	19	—	—	—	—	—
2000–01	Montreal Canadiens	NHL	62	21	24	45	26	—	—	—	—	—
2001–02	Montreal Canadiens	NHL	47	14	15	29	30	—	—	—	—	—
2001–02	Phoenix Coyotes	NHL	30	6	6	12	8	5	0	0	0	0
2002–03	Phoenix Coyotes	NHL	43	6	10	16	22	—	—	—	—	—
2003–04	Phoenix Coyotes	NHL	61	12	13	25	36	—	—	—	—	—
2003–04	St. Louis Blues	NHL	13	4	3	7	2	5	1	1	2	0
2005–06	Philadelphia Flyers	NHL	66	9	5	14	28	6	1	0	1	4
NHL totals			674	192	167	359	321	39	3	8	11	12

=== International ===
Olympic medal record

Men's ice hockey
Silver medal – second place	1994 Lillehammer	Ice hockey

Year	Team	Event	GP	G	A	Pts	PIM
1993	Canada	WC	8	1	0	1	2
1994	Canada	OG	8	2	2	4	6
1999	Canada	WC	8	3	3	6	6
Senior totals			24	6	5	11	14

Awards and achievements
Preceded by Dwayne Norris	CCHA Player of the Year; 1992-93	Succeeded by David Oliver
