= Wayne Hillman =

Canadian ice hockey player

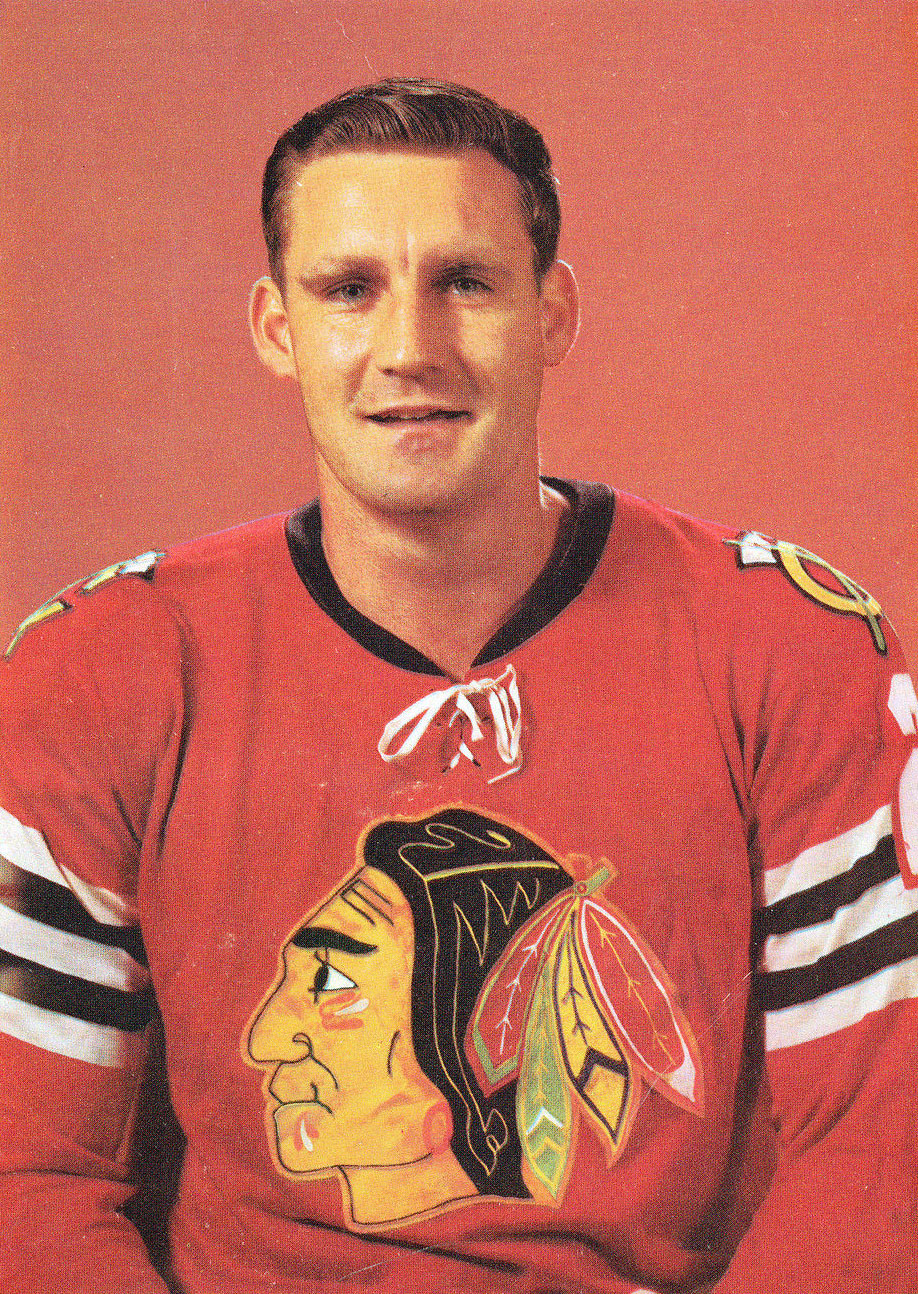
- Born: November 13, 1938 Kirkland Lake, Ontario, Canada
- Died: November 24, 1990 (aged 52)
- Height: 6 ft 1 in (185 cm)
- Weight: 205 lb (93 kg; 14 st 9 lb)
- Position: Defence
- Shot: Left
- Played for: Chicago Black Hawks; New York Rangers; Minnesota North Stars; Philadelphia Flyers; Cleveland Crusaders
- Playing career: 1957–1975

Wayne James Hillman (November 13, 1938 – November 24, 1990) was a Canadian professional ice hockey defenceman who played in the National Hockey League (NHL) for the Chicago Black Hawks, New York Rangers, Minnesota North Stars and Philadelphia Flyers between 1961 and 1973, and then in the World Hockey Association (WHA) with the Cleveland Crusaders from 1973 to 1975.

== Playing career ==
He was born in Kirkland Lake, Ontario, and was the younger brother of defenceman Larry Hillman and defenceman Floyd Hillman, and was the uncle of former NHL forward Brian Savage.

Hillman played in one game during the 1961 Stanley Cup Final for Chicago on April 16, 1961, so his name was engraved on the Stanley Cup with the rest of the team.

Hillman died of cancer on November 24, 1990.

== Career statistics ==
=== Regular season and playoffs ===
			Regular season					Playoffs
Season	Team	League	GP	G	A	Pts	PIM	GP	G	A	Pts	PIM
1955–56	St. Catharines Teepees	OHA	43	2	2	4	23	6	1	0	1	4
1956–57	St. Catharines Teepees	OHA	49	5	9	14	83	14	0	13	13	32
1956–57	Buffalo Bisons	AHL	1	0	0	0	0	—	—	—	—	—
1957–58	St. Catharines Teepees	OHA	52	13	26	39	160	8	1	5	6	18
1958–59	St. Catharines Teepees	OHA	49	8	30	38	115	7	0	0	0	21
1958–59	Buffalo Bisons	AHL	1	0	1	1	0	—	—	—	—	—
1959–60	Buffalo Bisons	AHL	64	1	13	14	48	—	—	—	—	—
1960–61	Buffalo Bisons	AHL	72	0	18	18	40	4	0	1	1	0
1960–61	Chicago Black Hawks	NHL	—	—	—	—	—	1	0	0	0	0
1961–62	Chicago Black Hawks	NHL	19	0	2	2	14	—	—	—	—	—
1961–62	Buffalo Bisons	AHL	50	2	16	18	43	9	0	1	1	10
1962–63	Chicago Black Hawks	NHL	67	3	5	8	72	6	0	2	2	2
1963–64	Chicago Black Hawks	NHL	59	1	4	5	51	7	0	1	1	15
1964–65	Chicago Black Hawks	NHL	19	0	1	1	8	—	—	—	—	—
1964–65	St. Louis Braves	CPHL	29	7	12	19	19	—	—	—	—	—
1964–65	New York Rangers	NHL	22	1	7	8	26	—	—	—	—	—
1965–66	New York Rangers	NHL	68	3	17	20	70	—	—	—	—	—
1966–67	New York Rangers	NHL	67	2	12	14	43	4	0	0	0	2
1967–68	New York Rangers	NHL	62	0	5	5	46	2	0	0	0	0
1968–69	Minnesota North Stars	NHL	50	0	8	8	32	—	—	—	—	—
1969–70	Philadelphia Flyers	NHL	68	3	5	8	69	—	—	—	—	—
1970–71	Philadelphia Flyers	NHL	69	5	7	12	47	—	—	—	—	—
1971–72	Philadelphia Flyers	NHL	47	0	3	3	21	—	—	—	—	—
1972–73	Philadelphia Flyers	NHL	74	0	10	10	33	8	0	0	0	0
1973–74	Cleveland Crusaders	WHA	66	1	7	8	51	5	0	0	0	16
1974–75	Cleveland Crusaders	WHA	60	2	9	11	37	5	0	2	2	2
WHA totals			126	3	16	19	88	10	0	2	2	18
NHL totals			691	18	86	104	532	28	0	3	3	19
