= Brett Clark (ice hockey) =

Canadian ice hockey player (born 1976)

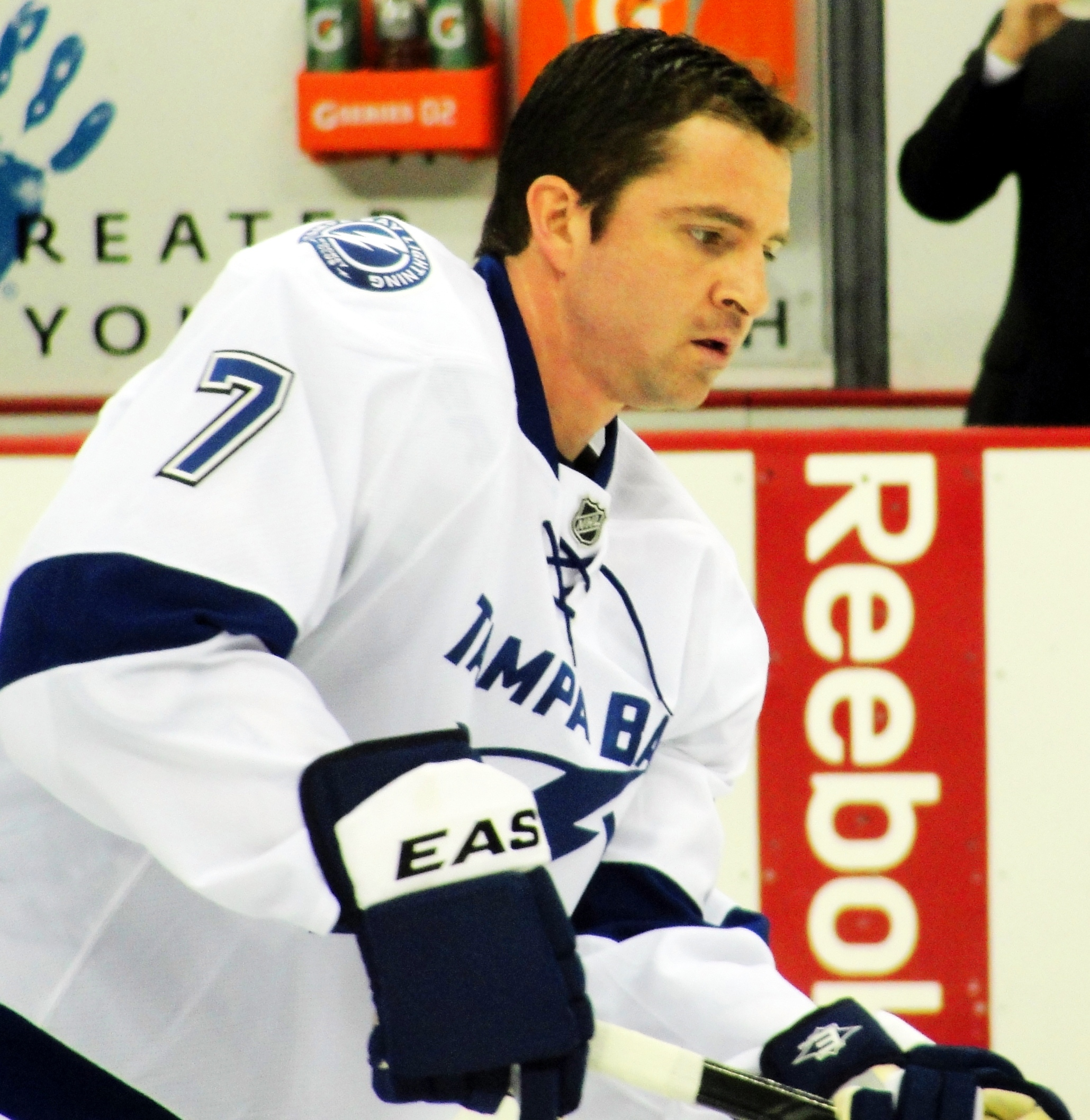
- Clark with the Lightning in 2012.
- Born: December 23, 1976 (age 49) Wapella, Saskatchewan, Canada
- Height: 6 ft 0 in (183 cm)
- Weight: 195 lb (88 kg; 13 st 13 lb)
- Position: Defence
- Shot: Left
- Played for: Montreal Canadiens; Atlanta Thrashers; Colorado Avalanche; Tampa Bay Lightning; Minnesota Wild
- NHL draft: 154th overall, 1996; Montreal Canadiens
- Playing career: 1997–2014

Brett Barry Clark (born December 23, 1976) is a Canadian-American former professional ice hockey defenceman. He previously played in the National Hockey League with the Montreal Canadiens, Atlanta Thrashers, Colorado Avalanche, Tampa Bay Lightning and the Minnesota Wild.

== Playing career ==
Clark was drafted in the 6th round, 154th overall, by the Montreal Canadiens in the 1996 NHL entry draft. He was selected from the University of Maine of the Hockey East where he named to the All-Rookie Team in his freshman year. Under the preference of the Canadiens, Clark spent the following season developing with the Canadian National Team program, before he made his professional debut in the 1997–98 season.

After only 20 games with AHL affiliate, the Fredericton Canadiens, Clark made his debut with the Canadiens and remained with the team scoring a goal, on his 21st birthday, in 41 games for the season. Not used as a depth defenseman in the playoffs, he further established himself in the 1998–99 season, appearing in 61 contests for the Canadiens.

On June 25, 1999, Clark was claimed in the 1999 expansion draft by the Atlanta Thrashers. His NHL career stalled with the Thrashers, unable to find a role in his three seasons. He found success on the Thrashers' minor-league affiliate team, winning the Turner Cup in 2001 with the Orlando Solar Bears.

During the 2001–02 season on January 24, 2002, Clark was traded by the Thrashers to the Colorado Avalanche for Frederic Cassivi. He spent the majority of the next three seasons with the Avalanche's affiliate, the Hershey Bears of the AHL. He was twice named the Bears' best defenseman of the year, and led the AHL in plus/minus (+28) in 2000–01.

After the 2004 NHL Lockout, and at age 28, Clark finally established a role as a two-way defenseman with the Avalanche in 2005–06. He appeared in 80 games and scored a respectable 36 points. In his playoff debut, he scored against the Dallas Stars in game one of the Western Conference Quarterfinals on April 22, and subsequently finished the playoffs tied with Rob Blake for the team scoring lead among defenseman with four points. On June 30, 2006, Clark re-signed on a two-year contract with Colorado.

In the 2006–07 season, Clark had a career-high year appearing in 82 games and scoring 10 goals for 39 points and leading the NHL in average shifts per game. On February 24, 2007, Clark played in his 300th career NHL game against the Los Angeles Kings.

On August 27, 2007, Clark signed a two-year contract extension with the Avalanche prior to the 2007–08 season. He again led the NHL in shifts per game before he was sidelined for the rest of the regular season and playoffs after suffering a dislocated shoulder on February 12, 2008. In 2008–09 Clark returned to set an Avalanche record of 238 hits, second in the NHL, but struggled offensively in recording 12 points in 76 games. In the 2009–10 season, on January 29, Clark appeared in his 500th career NHL game against the Dallas Stars.

After eight seasons within the Avalanche organization Clark left as a free agent to sign a two-year contract with the Tampa Bay Lightning on July 5, 2010. In the 2010–11 season, Clark was re-inserted on the powerplay with the Lightning and produced 9 goals for his highest total since 2007, helping the Lightning advance to the 2011 Eastern Conference finals.

A free agent upon the 2012 NHL lockout, Clark signed an AHL contract with the Oklahoma City Barons during the midpoint of the 2012–13 season on January 21, 2013. Clark immediately established himself within the Barons producing 17 points in just 18 games. On March 13, 2013, Clark signalled his return to the NHL after he was signed to add a veteran presence for the remainder of the season with the Minnesota Wild. Clark primarily was used as a reserve defensemen however played in 8 games with the Wild, compiling 1 assist.

A free agent again well into the 2013–14 season, Clark signed a professional try-out with the Lake Erie Monsters on December 6, 2013, marking a return of sorts to NHL affiliate, the Colorado Avalanche. Unable to help the Monsters qualify for the playoffs, Clark was still able to contribute from the blueline with 6 goals and 14 points in 53 games.

== Coaching career ==
Prior to the 2014–15 season, Clark announced the end of his playing career but remained in the Avalanche organization by accepting a player development consultant position. Clark remained a player development and coaching role with the Avalanche for seven seasons. Entering the 2021–22 season, Clark was slated to continue his role as an assistant coach with the Avalanche AHL affiliate, the Colorado Eagles, however vacated his position within the organization over COVID-19 protocols.

Clark remained in Colorado, later serving as an assistant coach in the junior ranks with the Colorado Rampage of the T1EHL.

== Personal life ==
Brett is married to Candace and has 2 kids; son Cail, born in 2003, and daughter Ava, who was born December 10, 2007. He is the nephew of NHL hockey player Dave Dunn.

On July 5, 2018, Clark was formally sworn in as a United States citizen, having resided in Denver, Colorado since his retirement.

== Career statistics ==
			Regular season					Playoffs
Season	Team	League	GP	G	A	Pts	PIM	GP	G	A	Pts	PIM
1993–94	Melville Millionaires	SJHL	63	6	17	23	42	—	—	—	—	—
1994–95	Melville Millionaires	SJHL	62	19	32	51	77	—	—	—	—	—
1995–96	University of Maine	HE	39	7	31	38	22	—	—	—	—	—
1996–97	Canada	Intl	57	6	21	27	52	—	—	—	—	—
1997–98	Montreal Canadiens	NHL	41	1	0	1	20	—	—	—	—	—
1997–98	Fredericton Canadiens	AHL	20	0	6	6	6	4	0	1	1	17
1998–99	Montreal Canadiens	NHL	61	2	2	4	16	—	—	—	—	—
1998–99	Fredericton Canadiens	AHL	3	1	0	1	0	—	—	—	—	—
1999–2000	Atlanta Thrashers	NHL	14	0	1	1	4	—	—	—	—	—
1999–2000	Orlando Solar Bears	IHL	63	9	17	26	31	6	0	1	1	0
2000–01	Atlanta Thrashers	NHL	28	1	2	3	14	—	—	—	—	—
2000–01	Orlando Solar Bears	IHL	43	2	9	11	32	15	1	6	7	2
2001–02	Atlanta Thrashers	NHL	2	0	0	0	0	—	—	—	—	—
2001–02	Chicago Wolves	AHL	42	3	17	20	18	—	—	—	—	—
2001–02	Hershey Bears	AHL	32	7	9	16	12	8	0	2	2	6
2002–03	Hershey Bears	AHL	80	8	27	35	26	5	0	4	4	4
2003–04	Colorado Avalanche	NHL	12	1	1	2	6	—	—	—	—	—
2003–04	Hershey Bears	AHL	64	11	21	32	37	—	—	—	—	—
2004–05	Hershey Bears	AHL	67	7	38	45	54	—	—	—	—	—
2005–06	Colorado Avalanche	NHL	80	9	27	36	56	9	2	2	4	2
2006–07	Colorado Avalanche	NHL	82	10	29	39	50	—	—	—	—	—
2007–08	Colorado Avalanche	NHL	57	5	16	21	33	—	—	—	—	—
2008–09	Colorado Avalanche	NHL	76	2	10	12	32	—	—	—	—	—
2009–10	Colorado Avalanche	NHL	64	3	17	20	28	1	0	0	0	0
2010–11	Tampa Bay Lightning	NHL	82	9	22	31	14	18	1	2	3	8
2011–12	Tampa Bay Lightning	NHL	82	2	13	15	20	—	—	—	—	—
2012–13	Oklahoma City Barons	AHL	18	1	16	17	10	—	—	—	—	—
2012–13	Minnesota Wild	NHL	8	0	1	1	0	—	—	—	—	—
2013–14	Lake Erie Monsters	AHL	53	6	8	14	24	—	—	—	—	—
NHL totals			689	45	141	186	293	28	3	4	7	10

== Awards and honors ==
Award	Year
College
All-Hockey East Rookie Team	1995–96
IHL
Turner Cup (Orlando Solar Bears)	2001
AHL
Best Plus–minus (+28)	2002
