= 1970 Memorial Cup =

Canadian junior ice hockey championship

Tournament details
- Venue(s): Montreal Forum (Montreal, Quebec)
- Dates: May 1970
- Teams: 11

Final positions
- Champions: Montreal Jr. Canadiens (OHA) (3rd title)

The Memorial Cup trophy

The 1970 Memorial Cup was the 52nd annual Memorial Cup competition, organized by the Canadian Amateur Hockey Association (CAHA) to determine the champion of junior A ice hockey. It was a best-of-seven series between the Montreal Jr. Canadiens of the Ontario Hockey Association and the Weyburn Red Wings of the Saskatchewan Junior Hockey League held at the Montreal Forum in Montreal, Quebec. Montreal won their third Memorial Cup, defeating Weyburn four games to none.

== Scores ==
- Game 1: Montreal 9-4 Weyburn
- Game 2: Montreal 6-2 Weyburn
- Game 3: Montreal 5-4 Weyburn
- Game 4: Montreal 6-5 Weyburn

=== Winning roster ===
1969-70 Montreal Junior Canadiens
Goaltenders: 1 – Wayne Wood; 30 – Michel Dion; 35 – John Garrett	Defencemen: 2 – Jocelyn Guevremont; 3 – Claude Moreau; 4 – Serge Lajeunesse; 5 – Ian Turnbull; 20 – Allan Globensky	Wingers: 8 – Bobby Guindon; 9 – Norm Gratton; 15 – Rick Martin; 17 – Hartland Monahan; 24 – Pierre Brind'Amour	Centres: 7 – Paulin Bordeleau; 10 – Richard Lemieux; 11 – Gilbert Perreault; 14 – Bobby Lalonde; Coach: Roger Bedard; General Manager: Phil Wimmer

== National Playoff Tree ==
Opening Round	Quarter-finals
BC	Vernon	2
Ssk	Weyburn	4
Alb	Red Deer	2
Ssk	Weyburn	4
Western Canada
Man	Dauphin	2
TB	Fort William	4
OHA	Montreal	4
NO	Sault Ste. Marie	1
Eastern Canada
PQ	Quebec	3
PQ	Port Alfred	0
PQ	Quebec	4
Mar	Charlottetown	2
Ott	Ottawa	1
Mar	Charlottetown	4

Semi-finals
Ssk	Weyburn	4
TB	Fort William	2
OHA	Montreal	3
PQ	Quebec	0

Memorial Cup
Ssk	Weyburn	0
OHA	Montreal	4

=== Additional Interleague Playdowns ===
Charlottetown Islanders defeated Fredericton Chevies 3-games-to-1

== Roll of League Champions ==
- BCJHL: Vernon Essos
- AJHL: Red Deer Rustlers
- SJHL: Weyburn Red Wings
- MJHL: Dauphin Kings
- TBJHL: Fort William Westfort Hurricanes
- NOJHA: Sault Ste. Marie Greyhounds
- OHA: Montreal Junior Canadiens
- CJHL: Ottawa M&W Rangers
- LHJQ: Quebec Remparts
- LHJSLS: Port Alfred Nationale
- New Brunswick: Fredericton Chevies
- MarJHL: Charlottetown Islanders
