= Dave Dunn =

Canadian ice hockey player

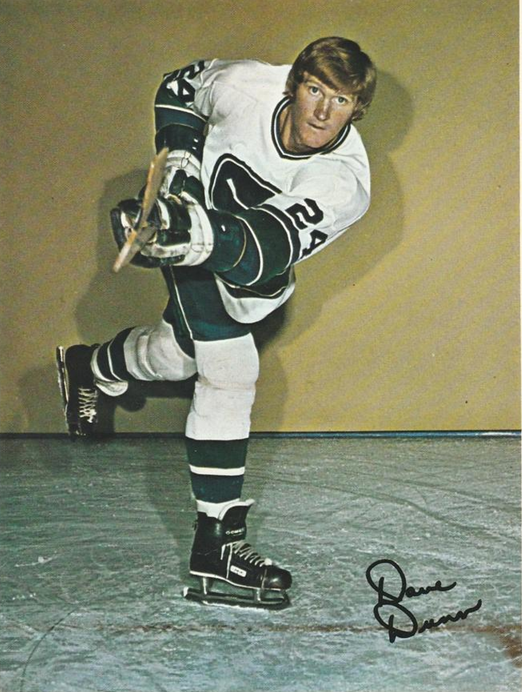
- Dunn in 1973 photo
- Born: August 19, 1948 (age 77) Moosomin, Saskatchewan, Canada
- Height: 6 ft 2 in (188 cm)
- Weight: 200 lb (91 kg; 14 st 4 lb)
- Position: Defence
- Shot: Left
- Played for: Vancouver Canucks; Toronto Maple Leafs; Winnipeg Jets (WHA)
- NHL draft: Undrafted
- Playing career: 1973–1978

David George Dunn (born August 19, 1948) is a Canadian former professional ice hockey player who played in the National Hockey League and the World Hockey Association during the 1970s.

== Career ==
Dunn played college hockey at the University of Saskatchewan and was signed as a free agent by the Vancouver Canucks upon the conclusion of his collegiate career in 1970. He would spend three seasons developing in the Canucks' system, culminating in a stellar 1972–73 season with the Seattle Totems of the WHL, in which he scored 19 goals and 75 points in 63 games and was named the league's top defender.

Dunn finally made his NHL debut in 1973–74, establishing himself as a regular on the Canuck blueline as a rookie. He posted fine totals of 11 goals, 22 assists, and 33 points in 68 games, good for 7th on the team in scoring. After a single game for Vancouver at the start of the 1974–75 campaign, Dunn was traded to the Toronto Maple Leafs for Garry Monahan and John Grisdale. He turned in another solid season for Toronto, finishing the year with 3 goals and 14 points in 73 games, along with 153 penalty minutes. In 1975–76, however, he lost his regular spot on the Leaf blueline and was dispatched briefly back to the minors, finishing the season with just 8 assists in 43 games.

With his NHL career at a standstill, Dunn jumped to the rival World Hockey Association for the 1976–77 campaign, signing with the Winnipeg Jets. Playing for a star-studded Jets team featuring the likes of Bobby Hull, Kent Nilsson, Ulf Nilsson and Anders Hedberg, Dunn would experience the most team success of his professional career, helping the Jets to the Avco Cup finals in back-to-back seasons, winning the championship in 1978.

Dunn retired following the Jets' championship win in 1978 and returned to the Vancouver Canucks, accepting an assistant coaching position with Vancouver alongside new coach Harry Neale, a position he held until 1981.

== Personal life ==
He is the uncle of Brett Clark.

== Career statistics ==
=== Regular season and playoffs ===
			Regular season					Playoffs
Season	Team	League	GP	G	A	Pts	PIM	GP	G	A	Pts	PIM
1966–67	Saskatchewan Huskies	CIAU	14	3	7	10	12	—	—	—	—	—
1967–68	Saskatchewan Huskies	CIAU	16	2	5	7	21	—	—	—	—	—
1968–69	Saskatchewan Huskies	CIAU	20	4	10	14	50	—	—	—	—	—
1969–70	Saskatchewan Huskies	CIAU	14	14	8	22	22	—	—	—	—	—
1970–71	Rochester Americans	AHL	56	2	13	15	74	—	—	—	—	—
1971–72	Rochester Americans	AHL	8	1	0	1	18	—	—	—	—	—
1971–72	Seattle Totems	WHL	46	10	12	22	104	—	—	—	—	—
1972–73	Seattle Totems	WHL	63	19	56	75	147	—	—	—	—	—
1973–74	Vancouver Canucks	NHL	68	11	22	33	76	—	—	—	—	—
1974–75	Vancouver Canucks	NHL	1	0	0	0	11	—	—	—	—	—
1974–75	Toronto Maple Leafs	NHL	72	3	11	14	142	7	1	1	2	24
1975–76	Toronto Maple Leafs	NHL	43	0	8	8	84	3	0	0	0	17
1975–76	Oklahoma City Blazers	CHL	9	1	7	8	10	—	—	—	—	—
1976–77	Winnipeg Jets	WHA	40	3	11	14	129	20	4	4	8	23
1977–78	Winnipeg Jets	WHA	66	6	20	26	79	9	1	2	3	0
WHA totals			106	9	31	40	208	29	5	6	11	23
NHL totals			184	14	41	55	313	10	1	1	2	41
