= Pierre Brind'Amour =

Pierre Rodrigue Brind'Amour (1941 – January 1995) was a French-speaking Canadian philologist, professor in the Department of Classics at the University of Ottawa.

Author of works on Greco-Roman antiquity, he brought new elements in support of a fact already seen by an anonymous writer from the eighteenth century, by Eugen Parker by Georges Dumézil and others, namely that Nostradamus, in his Prophecies, was inspired more than once by historical or literary books printed at his time.

A collection of Mélanges Pierre Rodrigue Brind'Amour were published in 2001 by the University of Quebec.

== Publications ==
- L'homme et le péché originel chez Jean Scot Erigène, Thèse de sciences médiévales, Université de Montréal, 1962.
- «La mort de Lucrèce», in Hommages à Marcel Renard, t. 1, Bruxelles, Latomus, 1969, p. 153–161.
- « L’Origine des Jeux Séculaires », in Aufstieg und Niedergang der römischen Welt, Volume 2, Walter de Gruyter, 1978, pp. 1334–1417.
- « La date du martyre de Polycarpe (23 février 167) », in Analecta bollandiana, 98, 1980, pp. 456–462.
- « Problèmes astrologiques et astronomiques soulevés par le récit de la mort de Domitien chez Suétone », in Phoenix, 35, 1981, pp. 338–344.
- « Jupiter et le bain dans le Tibre. À propos d’Horace, Satire II 3, 288–299 », in P. Brind'Amour, R. Kilpatrick et P. Senayin (dir.), Mélanges offerts en hommage au Révérend Père Etienne Gareau (Éditions de l'Université d'Ottawa, Ottawa & Trois-Rivières, 1982), pp. 159–163.
- « Manilius and the Computation of the Ascendant », in Classical Philology, 78, 1983, pp. 144–148.
- Le calendrier romain : recherches chronologiques, Ottawa, Éditions de l'Université d'Ottawa, 1983.
- Astro positions, Montreal, King Microware, c1983.
- « Nostradamus et l'histoire romaine », in Hommage à la mémoire de Ernest Pascal (dans Cahiers des Études anciennes, t. 23), 1990, t. 1, p. 55–65.
- « L'horoscope de l'avènement de Néron », in Cahiers des Etudes Anciennes, 25, 1991, pp. 145–151.
- Nostradamus astrophile : les astres et l'astrologie dans la vie et l'œuvre de Nostradamus, Ottawa, Presses de l'Université d'Ottawa et Éditions Klincksieck, 1993.
- Nostradamus, Les premières Centuries ou Prophéties, Édition et commentaire par Pierre Brind'Amour, Genève, Droz, 1996.
