= Gary Bromley =

Canadian ice hockey player

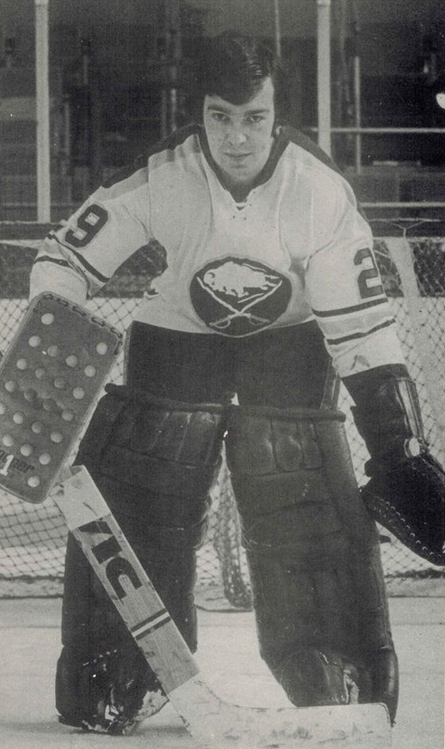
- Born: January 19, 1950 (age 76) Edmonton, Alberta, Canada
- Height: 5 ft 10 in (178 cm)
- Weight: 149 lb (68 kg; 10 st 9 lb)
- Position: Goaltender
- Caught: Left
- Played for: Buffalo Sabres; Vancouver Canucks; Calgary Cowboys; Winnipeg Jets
- NHL draft: Undrafted
- Playing career: 1971–1982

Gary Bert "Bones" Bromley (born January 19, 1950) is a Canadian former professional ice hockey goaltender. He played in the National Hockey League (NHL) with the Buffalo Sabres and Vancouver Canucks. He also played in the World Hockey Association (WHA) with the Calgary Cowboys and Winnipeg Jets.

In his NHL career, Bromley played in 136 games and accumulated a record of 54–44–28. In the WHA, he played in 67 games, with a record of 31–21–3. He may be best remembered for his "Skull" mask which he wore during his years with the Canucks. The idea for the design came from his nickname, "Bones".

== Career statistics ==
=== Regular season and playoffs ===
			Regular season									Playoffs
Season	Team	League	GP	W	L	T	MIN	GA	SO	GAA	SV%	GP	W	L	MIN	GA	SO	GAA	SV%
1968–69	Regina Pats	SJHL	—	—	—	—	—	—	—	—	—	11	4	7	680	48	0	4.24	—
1969–70	Regina Pats	SJHL	34	—	—	—	2002	119	0	3.57	—	—	—	—	—	—	—	—	—
1969–70	Weyburn Red Wings	M-Cup	—	—	—	—	—	—	—	—	—	2	0	1	9	2	0	13.33	—
1970–71	Regina Pats	WCHL	42	—	—	—	2457	152	2	3.71	—	6	—	—	340	24	0	4.24	—
1971–72	Charlotte Checkers	EHL	27	—	—	—	1620	73	4	2.70	—	1	0	1	60	7	0	7.00	—
1971–72	Cincinnati Swords	AHL	3	1	1	1	180	6	1	2.00	—	—	—	—	—	—	—	—	—
1972–73	Cincinnati Swords	AHL	31	—	—	—	1711	76	0	2.66	—	3	3	0	180	5	1	1.67	—
1973–74	Buffalo Sabres	NHL	12	3	5	3	598	33	0	3.31	.879	—	—	—	—	—	—	—	—
1973–74	Cincinnati Swords	AHL	34	19	11	3	1906	89	1	2.80	—	5	1	4	302	17	0	3.37	—
1974–75	Buffalo Sabres	NHL	50	26	11	11	2785	144	4	3.10	.873	—	—	—	—	—	—	—	—
1975–76	Buffalo Sabres	NHL	1	0	1	0	60	7	0	7.00	.794	—	—	—	—	—	—	—	—
1975–76	Providence Reds	AHL	7	4	1	1	405	30	0	4.44	—	—	—	—	—	—	—	—	—
1976–77	Calgary Cowboys	WHA	28	6	9	2	1237	79	0	3.83	—	—	—	—	—	—	—	—	—
1977–78	Winnipeg Jets	WHA	39	25	12	1	2250	124	1	3.31	—	5	4	0	268	7	0	1.57	—
1978–79	Vancouver Canucks	NHL	38	11	19	6	2141	136	2	3.81	.873	3	1	2	179	14	0	4.70	.851
1978–79	Dallas Black Hawks	CHL	4	2	1	1	250	6	1	1.44	—	—	—	—	—	—	—	—	—
1979–80	Vancouver Canucks	NHL	15	8	2	4	858	43	1	3.01	.892	4	1	3	180	11	0	3.68	.869
1979–80	Dallas Black Hawks	CHL	21	8	9	3	1289	88	0	4.10	—	—	—	—	—	—	—	—	—
1980–81	Vancouver Canucks	NHL	20	6	6	4	977	62	0	3.81	.867	—	—	—	—	—	—	—	—
1980–81	Dallas Black Hawks	CHL	2	1	1	0	127	8	0	3.78	—	—	—	—	—	—	—	—	—
1981–82	New Haven Nighthawks	AHL	44	22	17	3	2538	148	3	3.50	—	3	1	1	208	10	0	2.88	—
WHA totals			67	31	21	3	3487	203	1	3.49	—	5	4	0	268	7	0	1.57	—
NHL totals			136	54	44	28	7421	425	7	3.44	.874	7	2	5	359	25	0	4.18	.837
