= Larry Hillman =

Canadian ice hockey player and coach (1937–2022)

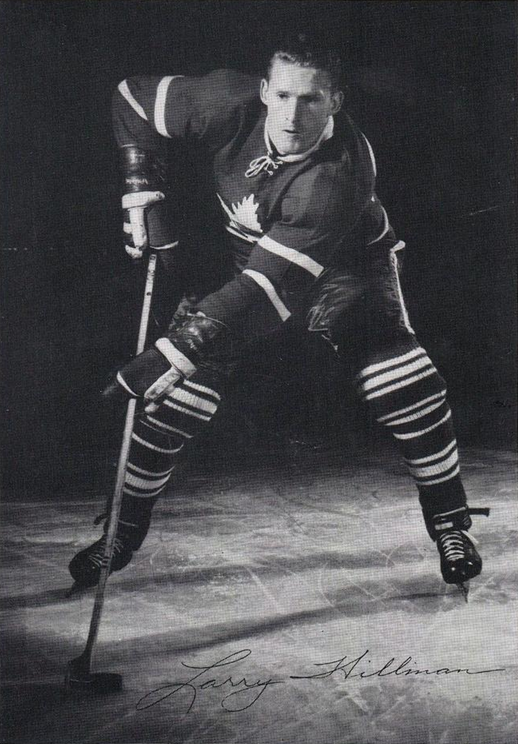
- Hillman in 1960
- Born: February 5, 1937 Kirkland Lake, Ontario, Canada
- Died: May 31, 2022 (aged 85) Sudbury, Ontario, Canada
- Height: 6 ft 0 in (183 cm)
- Weight: 180 lb (82 kg; 12 st 12 lb)
- Position: Defence
- Shot: Left
- Played for: Detroit Red Wings; Boston Bruins; Toronto Maple Leafs; Minnesota North Stars; Montreal Canadiens; Philadelphia Flyers; Los Angeles Kings; Buffalo Sabres; Cleveland Crusaders; Winnipeg Jets
- Playing career: 1955–1976

Lawrence Morley Hillman (February 5, 1937 – May 31, 2022) was a Canadian professional ice hockey defenceman and coach. One of the most travelled players in hockey history, he played for 15 different teams in his 22 professional seasons. He played in the National Hockey League (NHL) between 1955 and 1973, and then in the World Hockey Association (WHA) from 1973 to 1976. After retiring he spent parts of three seasons as a coach in the WHA. Hillman had his name engraved on the Stanley Cup six times during his playing career.

== Early life ==
Hillman was born in Kirkland Lake, Ontario, on February 5, 1937. He began his junior career by playing one season for the Windsor Spitfires of the Ontario Hockey League (OHL) in 1953. After joining the Hamilton Tiger Cubs in the middle of the 1953–54 season, he joined the Detroit Red Wings in 1955.

== Playing career ==
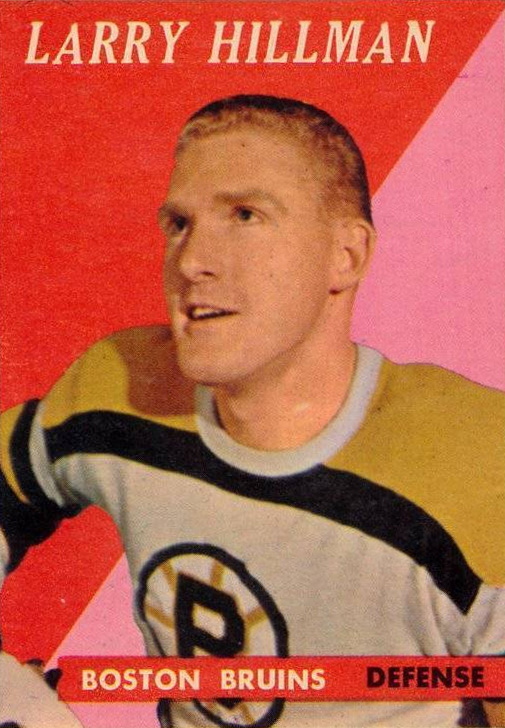
Hillman in 1958 Topps card

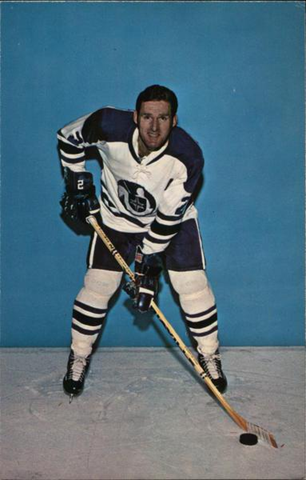
Larry Hillman in 1973 postcard for Cleveland Crusaders

Hillman made his NHL debut for the Red Wings on March 5, 1955, against the New York Rangers at Detroit Olympia. He won his first Stanley Cup championship with the franchise later that year, becoming the youngest player to have his name engraved on the Stanley Cup, at 18 years, two months, nine days old. This is a record that cannot be broken under the current rules, as a player must be 18 years old by September 15 to be eligible to play in the NHL that season. He split the following season between the Buffalo Bisons of the American Hockey League (AHL) and Detroit. Hillman subsequently left the Red Wings after the 1956–57 season and went to the Boston Bruins. He scored his first goal for the Bruins on December 19, 1957, in a 3–3 tie with New York at Boston Garden. He led the league with 70 games played that season. He ultimately played two full seasons in Boston before being sent to their minor league team, the Providence Reds, for most of the 1959–60 season.

Hillman went to the Toronto Maple Leafs in 1961 and continued to bounce from the minor leagues to the NHL and back. He played on four Stanley Cup-winning teams in Toronto in 1962, 1963, 1964, and 1967, although he only played in the Final in the latter two occasions. In between those Cup wins, he played parts of six seasons with the Rochester Americans and the Springfield Indians. Hillman was named to AHL All-Star First Team in 1965 and captained the Americans to the first Calder Cup later that year.

Following the 1967–68 season, Hillman signed with the expansion Minnesota North Stars who later traded Hillman to the Montreal Canadiens, with whom he won his sixth and final Stanley Cup championship in 1969. He was one of only 11 players to win the Stanley Cup with three or more different teams. During the 1969–70 season, he again led the NHL in games played (76).

After Montreal, Hillman played for the Philadelphia Flyers, Los Angeles Kings, and Buffalo Sabres. Following the 1972–73 season, he left the NHL for the World Hockey Association, and played two seasons for the Cleveland Crusaders. His final season was in 1975–76, playing for the Winnipeg Jets.

== Coaching career ==
After his playing career ended, Hillman took over as coach of the Jets in 1977. He led the franchise to the Avco Cup in his rookie season, in which he recorded a .638 winning percentage (50–28–2). However, he was fired 61 games into the 1978–79 campaign, after the Jets went 28–27–6.

== Personal life ==
Hillman was the older brother of NHL and WHA defencemen Wayne Hillman and Floyd Hillman. He was also the uncle of former NHL forward Brian Savage. Hillman was married to Liz until his death. During his later years, they resided in a townhouse on Lake Timiskaming, close to where he was born.

Hillman died at a hospital in Sudbury, Ontario on May 31, 2022, at the age of 85.

== Career statistics ==
=== Regular season and playoffs ===
			Regular season					Playoffs
Season	Team	League	GP	G	A	Pts	PIM	GP	G	A	Pts	PIM
1952–53	Windsor Spitfires	OHA	56	2	4	6	39	—	—	—	—	—
1953–54	Hamilton Tiger Cubs	OHA	58	6	14	20	99	7	0	2	2	10
1954–55	Hamilton Tiger Cubs	OHA	49	5	20	25	106	3	0	1	1	9
1954–55	Detroit Red Wings	NHL	6	0	0	0	2	3	0	1	1	9
1955–56	Detroit Red Wings	NHL	47	0	3	3	53	10	0	1	1	6
1955–56	Buffalo Bisons	AHL	15	1	3	4	21	—	—	—	—	—
1956–57	Detroit Red Wings	NHL	16	1	2	3	4	—	—	—	—	—
1956–57	Edmonton Flyers	WHL	46	4	2	6	87	8	0	4	4	2
1957–58	Boston Bruins	NHL	70	3	19	22	60	11	0	2	2	6
1958–59	Boston Bruins	NHL	55	3	10	13	19	7	0	1	1	0
1959–60	Boston Bruins	NHL	2	0	1	1	2	—	—	—	—	—
1959–60	Providence Reds	AHL	70	12	31	43	159	5	0	1	1	4
1960–61	Toronto Maple Leafs	NHL	62	3	10	13	59	5	0	0	0	0
1961–62	Toronto Maple Leafs	NHL	5	0	0	0	4	—	—	—	—	—
1961–62	Rochester Americans	AHL	26	1	14	15	16	—	—	—	—	—
1962–63	Toronto Maple Leafs	NHL	5	0	0	0	2	—	—	—	—	—
1962–63	Springfield Indians	AHL	65	5	23	28	56	—	—	—	—	—
1963–64	Toronto Maple Leafs	NHL	33	0	4	4	31	11	0	0	0	2
1963–64	Rochester Americans	AHL	32	1	18	19	48	—	—	—	—	—
1964–65	Toronto Maple Leafs	NHL	2	0	0	0	2	—	—	—	—	—
1964–65	Rochester Americans	AHL	71	9	43	52	98	10	3	5	8	31
1965–66	Toronto Maple Leafs	NHL	48	3	25	28	34	4	1	1	2	6
1965–66	Rochester Americans	AHL	22	2	20	22	34	—	—	—	—	—
1966–67	Toronto Maple Leafs	NHL	55	4	19	23	40	12	1	2	3	6
1966–67	Rochester Americans	AHL	12	1	12	13	16	—	—	—	—	—
1967–68	Toronto Maple Leafs	NHL	55	3	17	20	13	—	—	—	—	—
1967–68	Rochester Americans	AHL	6	0	1	1	0	—	—	—	—	—
1968–69	Minnesota North Stars	NHL	12	1	5	6	0	—	—	—	—	—
1968–69	Montreal Canadiens	NHL	25	0	5	5	17	1	0	0	0	0
1969–70	Philadelphia Flyers	NHL	76	5	26	31	73	—	—	—	—	—
1970–71	Philadelphia Flyers	NHL	73	3	13	16	39	4	0	2	2	2
1971–72	Los Angeles Kings	NHL	22	1	2	3	11	—	—	—	—	—
1971–72	Buffalo Sabres	NHL	43	1	11	12	58	—	—	—	—	—
1972–73	Buffalo Sabres	NHL	78	5	24	29	56	6	0	0	0	8
1973–74	Cleveland Crusaders	WHA	44	5	21	26	37	—	—	—	—	—
1974–75	Cleveland Crusaders	WHA	77	0	16	16	83	5	1	3	4	8
1975–76	Winnipeg Jets	WHA	71	1	12	13	62	12	0	2	2	32
WHA totals			192	6	49	55	182	17	1	5	6	40
NHL totals			790	36	196	232	579	74	2	9	11	36

== Coaching record ==
Team	Year	Regular season						Postseason			
Team	Year	G	W	L	OTL	Pts	Finish	W	L	Win%	Result
WPG	1977–78	80	50	28	2	102	1st in WHA	8	1	.889	Won Avco Cup (NEW)
WPG	1978–79	61	28	27	6	62	(fired)	—	—	—	—
Total		141	78	55	8			8	1	.889	

== Achievements ==
Award	Year(s)
Stanley Cup champion (as player)	1955, 1962, 1963, 1964, 1967, 1969
Calder Cup champion (as player)	1965
Avco World Trophy (as player)	1976
Avco World Trophy (as coach)	1978

Preceded by Bobby Kromm	Head coach of the Winnipeg Jets; 1977–79	Succeeded by Tom McVie
