= Garry Lariviere =

Canadian former ice hockey defenceman (born 1954)

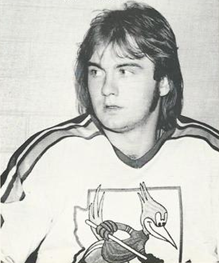
- Born: December 6, 1954 (age 71) St. Catharines, Ontario, Canada
- Height: 6 ft 0 in (183 cm)
- Weight: 190 lb (86 kg; 13 st 8 lb)
- Position: Defence
- Shot: Right
- Played for: Phoenix Roadrunners; Quebec Nordiques; Edmonton Oilers
- NHL draft: 83rd overall, 1974; Buffalo Sabres
- WHA draft: 39th overall, 1974; Chicago Cougars
- Playing career: 1974–1986

Garry Lariviere (born 6 December 1954) is a Canadian former ice hockey defenceman.

== Early life ==
Lariviere was born in St. Catharines, Ontario. His son Trevor Lariviere and grandson Dustin Lariviere are also hockey players. In 2023, Dustin's eleder brother Dylan Lariviere committed to play hockey at Rensselaer Polytechnic Institute after he was selected by the Flint Firebirds in the 2021 Ontario Hockey League draft. Dustin played for Niagara North Stars.

== Career ==
Lariviere was drafted by the Buffalo Sabres in the fifth round of the 1974 NHL amateur draft but opted to play in the rival World Hockey Association instead. He began his professional career with the Phoenix Roadrunners in 1974, was traded to the Quebec Nordiques in 1977 and was one of the players the Nordiques retained when the Nordiques merged into the National Hockey League in 1979. He also played for the Edmonton Oilers. He left the NHL after the 1983 season. He played 3 more years in the AHL for the St. Catharines Saints before retiring as a player.

== Coaching career ==
- He was an assistant coach for the St. Catharines Saints in 1985, and 1986.
- He was an assistant coach for the Toronto Maple Leafs from 1987 - 1990.

== Career statistics ==
| | | | Regular season | | | | | Playoffs |
| Season | Team | League | GP | G | A | Pts | PIM | GP | G | A | Pts | PIM |
|---|---|---|---|---|---|---|---|---|---|---|---|---|
| 1971–72 | St. Catharines Black Hawks | OHA-Jr. | 62 | 4 | 19 | 23 | 114 | 5 | 0 | 2 | 2 | 21 |
| 1972–73 | St. Catharines Black Hawks | OHA-Jr. | 55 | 5 | 32 | 37 | 140 | — | — | — | — | — |
| 1973–74 | St. Catharines Black Hawks | OHA-Jr. | 60 | 3 | 35 | 38 | 153 | — | — | — | — | — |
| 1973–74 | St. Catharines Black Hawks | M-Cup | — | — | — | — | — | 3 | 0 | 1 | 1 | 21 |
| 1974–75 | Phoenix Roadrunners | WHA | 4 | 0 | 1 | 1 | 28 | 1 | 0 | 0 | 0 | 0 |
| 1974–75 | Tulsa Oilers | CHL | 76 | 15 | 38 | 53 | 168 | — | — | — | — | — |
| 1975–76 | Phoenix Roadrunners | WHA | 79 | 7 | 17 | 24 | 100 | 5 | 0 | 2 | 2 | 2 |
| 1976–77 | Phoenix Roadrunners | WHA | 61 | 7 | 23 | 30 | 48 | — | — | — | — | — |
| 1976–77 | Quebec Nordiques | WHA | 15 | 0 | 3 | 3 | 8 | 17 | 0 | 10 | 10 | 10 |
| 1977–78 | Quebec Nordiques | WHA | 80 | 7 | 49 | 56 | 78 | 11 | 3 | 2 | 5 | 4 |
| 1978–79 | Quebec Nordiques | WHA | 50 | 5 | 33 | 38 | 54 | 4 | 0 | 1 | 1 | 2 |
| 1979–80 | Quebec Nordiques | NHL | 75 | 2 | 19 | 21 | 56 | — | — | — | — | — |
| 1980–81 | Quebec Nordiques | NHL | 52 | 3 | 13 | 16 | 50 | — | — | — | — | — |
| 1980–81 | Edmonton Oilers | NHL | 13 | 0 | 2 | 2 | 6 | 9 | 0 | 3 | 3 | 8 |
| 1981–82 | Edmonton Oilers | NHL | 62 | 1 | 21 | 22 | 41 | 4 | 0 | 1 | 1 | 0 |
| 1982–83 | Edmonton Oilers | NHL | 17 | 0 | 2 | 2 | 14 | 1 | 0 | 1 | 1 | 0 |
| 1983–84 | St. Catharines Saints | AHL | 65 | 7 | 35 | 42 | 41 | 7 | 0 | 3 | 3 | 2 |
| 1984–85 | St. Catharines Saints | AHL | 72 | 4 | 32 | 36 | 47 | — | — | — | — | — |
| 1985–86 | St. Catharines Saints | AHL | 52 | 0 | 9 | 9 | 10 | 6 | 0 | 1 | 1 | 6 |
| WHA totals | | | 289 | 26 | 126 | 152 | 316 | 38 | 3 | 15 | 18 | 18 |
| NHL totals | | | 219 | 6 | 57 | 63 | 167 | 14 | 0 | 5 | 5 | 8 |
| AHL totals | | | 189 | 11 | 76 | 87 | 98 | 13 | 0 | 4 | 4 | 8 |
