= John Grisdale =

Canadian ice hockey player

- Born: August 23, 1948 (age 76); Geraldton, Ontario, Canada
- Height: 6 ft 0 in (183 cm)
- Weight: 195 lb (88 kg; 13 st 13 lb)
- Position: Defence
- Shot: Right
- Played for: Toronto Maple Leafs; Vancouver Canucks
- Playing career: 1970–1979

John Russell Grisdale (born August 23, 1948) is a retired professional ice hockey player who played 250 games as a defenceman in the National Hockey League for the Toronto Maple Leafs and Vancouver Canucks. He also spent several years playing in the minor Central Hockey League, and retired in 1979.

Grisdale graduated with a Bachelor of Science in Mechanical Engineering in 1971 from Michigan Technological University where he was a three-year letterman with the Huskies men's hockey team. He had 11 goals and 41 assists for 52 points in 94 career games with the Huskies. He was inducted into the Michigan Technological University Athletics Hall of Fame in 1997.

He was the commissioner of the BCHL from 2003 to 2018, and resides in the city of Coquitlam.

== Career statistics ==
=== Regular season and playoffs ===
			Regular season					Playoffs
Season	Team	League	GP	G	A	Pts	PIM	GP	G	A	Pts	PIM
1966–67	Dixie Beehives	MetJHL	—	—	—	—	—	—	—	—	—	—
1967–68	Michigan Tech	WCHA	—	—	—	—	—	—	—	—	—	—
1968–69	Michigan Tech	WCHA	30	7	7	14	45	—	—	—	—	—
1969–70	Michigan Tech	WCHA	33	2	11	13	62	—	—	—	—	—
1970–71	Michigan Tech	WCHA	31	2	23	25	61	—	—	—	—	—
1970–71	Tulsa Oilers	CHL	4	2	0	2	12	—	—	—	—	—
1971–72	Tulsa Oilers	CHL	59	0	15	15	105	13	1	3	4	23
1972–73	Toronto Maple Leafs	NHL	49	1	7	8	76	—	—	—	—	—
1973–74	Tulsa Oilers	CHL	71	9	29	38	193	—	—	—	—	—
1974–75	Vancouver Canucks	NHL	58	1	12	13	91	5	0	1	1	13
1974–75	Toronto Maple Leafs	NHL	2	0	0	0	4	—	—	—	—	—
1975–76	Tulsa Oilers	CHL	5	1	0	1	13	3	0	1	1	8
1975–76	Vancouver Canucks	NHL	38	2	6	8	54	2	0	0	0	0
1976–77	Tulsa Oilers	CHL	47	2	23	25	132	9	2	4	6	11
1976–77	Vancouver Canucks	NHL	20	0	2	2	20	—	—	—	—	—
1977–78	Vancouver Canucks	NHL	42	0	9	9	47	—	—	—	—	—
1978–79	Dallas Black Hawks	CHL	4	1	0	1	4	—	—	—	—	—
1978–79	Vancouver Canucks	NHL	41	0	3	3	54	3	0	0	0	2
CHL totals			190	15	67	82	459	22	3	7	10	34
NHL totals			250	4	39	43	346	10	0	1	1	15
