= Jean-Louis Levasseur =

Canadian ice hockey player (b. 1949)

- Born: June 16, 1949 (age 77) Noranda, Quebec, Canada
- Height: 5 ft 10 in (178 cm)
- Weight: 160 lb (73 kg; 11 st 6 lb)
- Position: Goaltender
- Caught: Left
- Played for: Minnesota North Stars; Minnesota Fighting Saints; Edmonton Oilers; New England Whalers; Quebec Nordiques
- NHL draft: Undrafted
- WHA draft: Undrafted
- Playing career: 1972–1981

Jean-Louis Levasseur (born June 16, 1949), also known as Louis Levasseur, is a Canadian retired professional ice hockey goaltender who played in one National Hockey League game for the Minnesota North Stars during the 1979–80 season. He also spent parts of four seasons in the World Hockey Association (WHA) with the Minnesota Fighting Saints, Edmonton Oilers, New England Whalers, and Quebec Nordiques between 1975 and 1979.

He was the inspiration for the character of Denis Lemieux in the movie Slap Shot and appeared in an uncredited role in the film.

== Career statistics ==
=== Regular season and playoffs ===
			Regular season									Playoffs
Season	Team	League	GP	W	L	T	MIN	GA	SO	GAA	SV%	GP	W	L	MIN	GA	SO	GAA	SV%
1968–69	Nashville Dixie Flyers	EHL	2	1	1	0	120	7	0	3.50	.909	—	—	—	—	—	—	—	—
1972–73	Orillia Terriers	OHA Sr	35	—	—	—	2100	114	1	3.26	—	—	—	—	—	—	—	—	—
1972–73	Tulsa Oilers	CHL	4	—	—	—	169	13	1	4.62	—	—	—	—	—	—	—	—	—
1973–74	Orillia Terriers	OHA Sr	14	—	—	—	840	48	1	3.43	—	—	—	—	—	—	—	—	—
1974–75	Johnstown Jets	NAHL	28	12	10	2	1504	79	1	3.15	—	12	8	4	654	29	0	2.66	—
1975–76	Minnesota Fighting Saints	WHA	4	2	1	0	193	10	0	3.11	.885	—	—	—	—	—	—	—	—
1975–76	Johnstown Jets	NAHL	30	22	7	1	1757	89	0	3.04	—	5	—	—	264	19	0	4.32	—
1976–77	Minnesota Fighting Saints	WHA	30	15	11	2	1715	78	2	2.73	.920	—	—	—	—	—	—	—	—
1976–77	Edmonton Oilers	WHA	21	6	12	3	1213	88	0	4.35	.866	2	0	2	133	10	0	4.51	—
1977–78	New England Whalers	WHA	27	14	11	2	1655	91	3	3.30	.886	12	8	4	719	31	0	2.59	—
1978–79	Quebec Nordiques	WHA	3	0	1	0	140	14	0	6.00	.835	1	0	1	59	8	0	8.14	—
1978–79	Binghamton Dusters	AHL	25	10	12	2	1463	92	0	3.77	.880	—	—	—	—	—	—	—	—
1978–79	Springfield Indians	AHL	9	4	3	0	480	30	0	3.75	.870	—	—	—	—	—	—	—	—
1979–80	Minnesota North Stars	NHL	1	0	1	0	60	7	0	7.00	.806	—	—	—	—	—	—	—	—
1979–80	Oklahoma City Stars	CHL	37	19	14	3	2225	107	4	2.89	.894	—	—	—	—	—	—	—	—
1980–81	Oklahoma City Stars	CHL	21	9	8	1	1120	72	0	3.86	.868	—	—	—	—	—	—	—	—
WHA totals			85	37	36	8	4916	370	5	4.16	.892	15	8	7	911	49	0	3.23	—
NHL totals			1	0	1	0	60	7	0	7.00	.806	—	—	—	—	—	—	—	—

== See also ==
- List of players who played only one game in the NHL
