= Kent Ruhnke =

Canadian ice hockey player (born 1952)

- Born: September 18, 1952 (age 73) Toronto, Ontario, Canada
- Height: 6 ft 1 in (185 cm)
- Weight: 185 lb (84 kg; 13 st 3 lb)
- Position: Right wing
- Shot: Right
- Played for: Boston Bruins; Winnipeg Jets
- NHL draft: Undrafted
- Playing career: 1976–1982; 1985–1990

Kent Stuart Ruhnke (born September 18, 1952) is a Canadian former ice hockey player who played two games in the National Hockey League, with the Boston Bruins, and 72 games in the World Hockey Association, with the Winnipeg Jets, between 1976 and 1978. He later spent several years playing in the Swiss National League A. He later worked as a coach at Dalhousie University and in Switzerland.

As a youth, he played in the 1965 Quebec International Pee-Wee Hockey Tournament with the Scarboro Lions minor ice hockey team. In university, he played for the University of Toronto Varsity Blues from 1971–72 to 1975–76; the Blues won the national CIAU University Cup championship in 1972, 1973 and 1976, with Ruhnke winning the Major W.J. "Danny" McLeod Award in 1976, as Most Valuable Player of the national championship tournament.

== Career statistics ==
=== Regular season and playoffs ===
			Regular season					Playoffs
Season	Team	League	GP	G	A	Pts	PIM	GP	G	A	Pts	PIM
1971–72	University of Toronto	CIAU	20	9	6	15	10	—	—	—	—	—
1972–73	University of Toronto	CIAU	20	22	13	35	6	—	—	—	—	—
1973–74	University of Toronto	CIAU	20	27	13	40	8	—	—	—	—	—
1973–74	Barrie Flyers	OHA	1	1	0	1	0	—	—	—	—	—
1974–75	University of Toronto	CIAU	20	10	5	15	10	—	—	—	—	—
1975–76	University of Toronto	CIAU	20	29	15	44	6	—	—	—	—	—
1975–76	Boston Bruins	NHL	2	0	1	1	0	—	—	—	—	—
1976–77	Winnipeg Jets	WHA	51	11	11	22	2	—	—	—	—	—
1977–78	Winnipeg Jets	WHA	21	8	9	17	2	5	2	0	2	0
1977–78	Binghamton Dusters	AHL	47	14	20	34	2	—	—	—	—	—
1978–79	SC Riessersee	GER	49	42	37	79	4	—	—	—	—	—
1980–81	Zürcher SC	NLB	—	—	—	—	—	—	—	—	—	—
1981–82	Zürcher SC	NLA	19	10	12	22	—	—	—	—	—	—
1981–82	EHC Biel	NLA	—	—	—	—	—	—	—	—	—	—
1982–83	EHC Biel	NLA	—	—	—	—	—	—	—	—	—	—
1985–86	HC Fribourg-Gottéron	NLA	2	3	1	4	0	—	—	—	—	—
1987–88	EHC Olten	NLB	2	2	1	3	0	—	—	—	—	—
1988–89	EHC Olten	NLB	2	1	1	2	0	—	—	—	—	—
1989–90	EHC Olten	NLA	1	0	1	1	2	—	—	—	—	—
WHA totals			72	19	20	39	4	5	2	0	2	0
NHL totals			2	0	1	1	0	—	—	—	—	—
