= John Gibson (ice hockey, born 1959) =

Canadian ice hockey player (1959–2020)

- Born: June 2, 1959 St. Catharines, Ontario, Canada
- Died: January 19, 2020 (aged 60) St. Catharines, Ontario, Canada
- Height: 6 ft 3 in (191 cm)
- Weight: 205 lb (93 kg; 14 st 9 lb)
- Position: Defence
- Shot: Left
- Played for: Winnipeg Jets; Los Angeles Kings; Toronto Maple Leafs
- NHL draft: 71st overall, 1979; Los Angeles Kings
- Playing career: 1979–1987

John William Gibson (June 2, 1959 – January 19, 2020) was a Canadian professional ice hockey defenceman. He played 9 games in the World Hockey Association (WHA) and 48 games in the National Hockey League for the Winnipeg Jets, Toronto Maple Leafs, and Los Angeles Kings.

== Career statistics ==
=== Regular season and playoffs ===
			Regular season					Playoffs
Season	Team	League	GP	G	A	Pts	PIM	GP	G	A	Pts	PIM
1976–77	Niagara Falls Flyers	OMJHL	59	2	13	15	178	—	—	—	—	—
1977–78	Niagara Falls Flyers	OMJHL	60	8	20	28	133	—	—	—	—	—
1978–79	Niagara Falls Flyers	OMJHL	46	15	26	41	218	20	3	3	6	67
1978–79	Winnipeg Jets	WHA	9	0	1	1	5	—	—	—	—	—
1979–80	Niagara Falls Flyers	OMJHL	6	2	2	4	20	—	—	—	—	—
1979–80	Saginaw Gears	IHL	67	13	36	49	293	5	1	2	3	38
1979–80	Binghamton Dusters	AHL	1	0	0	0	0	—	—	—	—	—
1980–81	Los Angeles Kings	NHL	4	0	0	0	21	—	—	—	—	—
1980–81	Houston Apollos	CHL	33	5	5	10	94	—	—	—	—	—
1980–81	Birmingham Bulls	CHL	16	6	3	9	42	—	—	—	—	—
1980–81	Saginaw Gears	IHL	12	0	7	7	82	10	0	1	1	55
1981–82	Los Angeles Kings	NHL	6	0	0	0	18	—	—	—	—	—
1981–82	New Haven Nighthawks	AHL	7	1	0	1	24	—	—	—	—	—
1981–82	Cincinnati Tigers	CHL	6	1	2	3	30	—	—	—	—	—
1981–82	Toronto Maple Leafs	NHL	27	0	2	2	67	—	—	—	—	—
1981–82	New Brunswick Hawks	AHL	12	0	2	2	6	15	0	1	1	39
1982–83	St. Catharines Saints	AHL	21	1	4	5	38	—	—	—	—	—
1983–84	Sherbrooke Jets	AHL	49	4	11	15	174	—	—	—	—	—
1983–84	Winnipeg Jets	NHL	11	0	0	0	14	—	—	—	—	—
1986–87	Flint Spirits	IHL	4	0	1	1	0	—	—	—	—	—
1986–87	Brantford Motts Clamatos	OHA Sr	26	4	11	15	45	—	—	—	—	—
WHA totals			9	0	1	1	5	—	—	—	—	—
NHL totals			48	0	2	2	120	—	—	—	—	—
