= Bob Guindon =

Canadian ice hockey player (born 1950)

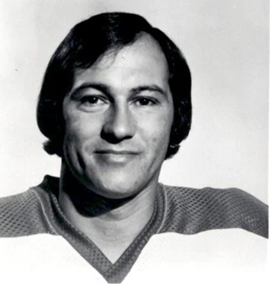
- Guindon in 1978 headshot
- Born: November 19, 1950 (age 75) Labelle, Quebec, Canada
- Height: 6 ft 1 in (185 cm)
- Weight: 180 lb (82 kg; 12 st 12 lb)
- Position: Left wing
- Shot: Left
- Played for: Quebec Nordiques; Winnipeg Jets
- NHL draft: 26th overall, 1970; Detroit Red Wings
- Playing career: 1970–1981

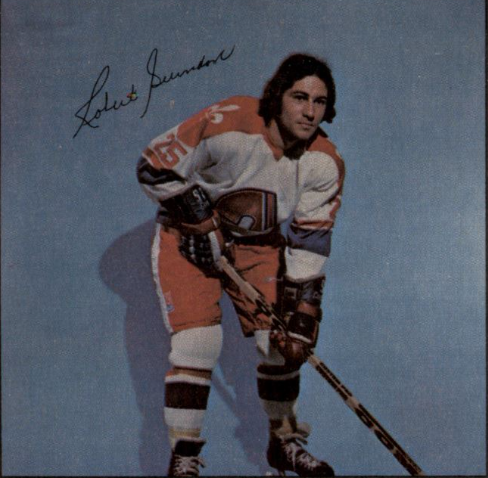
Guindon in 1974 card

Robert Pierre Guindon (geen-DOH; born November 19, 1950) is a Canadian former professional ice hockey forward.

As a youth, Guindon played in the 1962 Quebec International Pee-Wee Hockey Tournament with the Saint-Jérôme team.

Guindon started his World Hockey Association career with the Quebec Nordiques. He would also play with the Winnipeg Jets. It was Guindon that was named the WHA Playoff MVP of the 1978 WHA playoffs, where he recorded eight goals and five assists for 13 points in nine games played with a +9 as the Jets won the Avco World Trophy. After the Jets were absorbed by the National Hockey League in 1979, he would play just six games in the NHL before moving to the Tulsa Oilers in the Central Hockey League. He played one more season with the Oilers before retiring.

== Career statistics ==
			Regular season					Playoffs
Season	Team	League	GP	G	A	Pts	PIM	GP	G	A	Pts	PIM
1967–68	Saint-Jérôme Alouettes	QJHL	50	25	35	60	—	—	—	—	—	—
1968–69	Montreal Jr. Canadiens	OHA-Jr.	54	38	40	78	29	14	3	6	9	10
1968–69	Montreal Jr. Canadiens	MC	—	—	—	—	—	7	4	4	8	12
1969–70	Montreal Jr. Canadiens	OHA-Jr.	53	43	51	94	62	16	12	14	26	18
1969–70	Montreal Jr. Canadiens	MC	—	—	—	—	—	10	7	12	19	8
1970–71	Fort Worth Wings	CHL	61	12	13	25	15	4	0	0	0	7
1971–72	Fort Worth Wings	CHL	72	22	26	48	36	7	2	6	8	14
1972–73	Quebec Nordiques	WHA	71	28	28	56	31	—	—	—	—	—
1973–74	Quebec Nordiques	WHA	77	31	39	70	30	—	—	—	—	—
1974–75	Quebec Nordiques	WHA	69	12	18	30	23	15	7	6	13	10
1975–76	Winnipeg Jets	WHA	29	3	3	6	14	13	3	3	6	9
1976–77	Winnipeg Jets	WHA	69	10	17	27	19	20	4	4	8	9
1977–78	Winnipeg Jets	WHA	77	20	22	42	18	9	8	5	13	5
1978–79	Winnipeg Jets	WHA	71	8	18	26	21	7	2	1	3	0
1979–80	Winnipeg Jets	NHL	6	0	1	1	0	—	—	—	—	—
1979–80	Tulsa Oilers	CHL	36	11	18	29	10	—	—	—	—	—
1980–81	Tulsa Oilers	CHL	25	7	2	9	27	—	—	—	—	—
CHL totals			194	52	59	111	88	11	2	6	8	21
WHA totals			463	112	145	257	156	64	24	19	43	33
