= Mike Amodeo =

Canadian ice hockey player (born 1952)

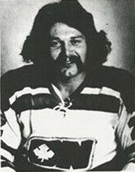
- Amodeo in 1972 photo
- Born: June 22, 1952 (age 73) Toronto, Ontario, Canada
- Height: 5 ft 10 in (178 cm)
- Weight: 190 lb (86 kg; 13 st 8 lb)
- Position: Defence
- Shot: Left
- Played for: NHL; Winnipeg Jets; WHA; Ottawa Nationals; Toronto Toros; Winnipeg Jets; AHL; Rochester Americans; CHL; Tulsa Oilers; SEL; Örebro IK
- National team: Italy
- NHL draft: 102nd overall, 1972; California Golden Seals
- Playing career: 1972–1983

Michael Anthony Amodeo (born June 22, 1952) is a retired professional ice hockey player who played 300 games in the World Hockey Association and 19 games in the National Hockey League. He played for the Ottawa Nationals, Toronto Toros, and Winnipeg Jets. As a youth, he played in the 1965 Quebec International Pee-Wee Hockey Tournament with the Scarboro Lions minor ice hockey team. Also he finished his career in Europe playing in Sweden and Italy.

== Career statistics ==
			Regular season					Playoffs
Season	Team	League	GP	G	A	Pts	PIM	GP	G	A	Pts	PIM
1969–70	Toronto Marlboros	OHA	54	5	11	16	161	—	—	—	—	—
1970–71	Oshawa Generals	OHA	24	0	12	12	65	—	—	—	—	—
1970–71	Toronto Marlboros	OHA	11	0	3	3	31	—	—	—	—	—
1970–71	Niagara Falls Flyers	OHA	3	0	0	0	2	—	—	—	—	—
1971–72	Oshawa Generals	OHA	63	6	34	40	130	—	—	—	—	—
1972–73	Ottawa Nationals	WHA	61	1	14	15	77	5	0	1	1	10
1973–74	Toronto Toros	WHA	77	0	11	11	82	12	0	2	2	26
1974–75	Toronto Toros	WHA	64	1	13	14	77	3	0	1	1	4
1975–76	Toronto Toros	WHA	31	4	8	12	35	—	—	—	—	—
1975–76	Rochester Americans	AHL	10	0	2	2	4	4	0	1	1	0
1976–77	Orebro IK	SHL	34	5	3	8	38	—	—	—	—	—
1977–78	Winnipeg Jets	WHA	3	1	1	2	0	7	1	3	4	19
1977–78	Orebro IK	Division 1	34	2	6	8	44	—	—	—	—	—
1978–79	Orebro IK	SHL	1	0	1	1	0	—	—	—	—	—
1978–79	Winnipeg Jets	WHA	64	4	18	22	29	—	—	—	—	—
1979–80	Winnipeg Jets	NHL	19	0	0	0	2	—	—	—	—	—
1979–80	Tulsa Oilers	CHL	20	3	6	9	32	—	—	—	—	—
1980–81	Orebro IK	Division 1	31	7	6	13	43	—	—	—	—	—
1981–82	HC Merano	Italy	31	20	21	41	14	—	—	—	—	—
1982–83	HC Merano	Italy	32	12	21	33	20	—	—	—	—	—
WHA totals			300	11	65	76	300	27	1	7	8	59
NHL totals			19	0	0	0	2	—	—	—	—	—
