= Tom Simpson (ice hockey) =

Canadian ice hockey player

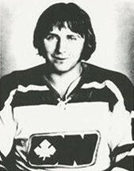
- Simpson in 1972 photo
- Born: August 12, 1952 (age 73) Bowmanville, Ontario, Canada
- Height: 5 ft 9 in (175 cm)
- Weight: 195 lb (88 kg; 13 st 13 lb)
- Position: Right wing
- Shot: Right
- Played for: Ottawa Nationals; Toronto Toros; Edmonton Oilers; Birmingham Bulls
- NHL draft: 89th overall, 1972; St. Louis Blues
- Playing career: 1972–1981

Tom Simpson (born August 12, 1952) is a Canadian retired professional ice hockey player who played 314 games in the World Hockey Association.

== Career ==
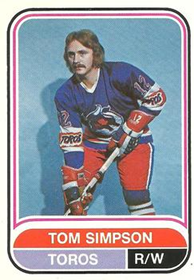
1975-76 card of Simpson for Toronto Toros

During his career, Simpson played with the Toronto Toros, Birmingham Bulls, and Edmonton Oilers of the World Hockey Association.

In the 1974-75 WHA season, Simpson (nicknamed "Shotgun" by fans) was one of six players to score 50 goals in the season. Since no player of the Toronto Maple Leafs organization had ever achieved a 50 goal season, Simpson was also the first professional player in Toronto hockey history to achieve a 50-goal season and the only one until 1981.

Since retiring from hockey, Simpson has worked as a health and safety coordinator.

== Personal life ==
Simpson lives in Peterborough, Ontario, and has three sons.

== Career statistics ==
			Regular season					Playoffs
Season	Team	League	GP	G	A	Pts	PIM	GP	G	A	Pts	PIM
1969–70	Oshawa Generals	OHA-Jr.	53	28	26	54	44	—	—	—	—	—
1970–71	Oshawa Generals	OHA-Jr.	59	42	20	62	82	—	—	—	—	—
1971–72	Oshawa Generals	OHA-Jr.	44	29	18	47	53	—	—	—	—	—
1972–73	Ottawa Nationals	WHA	57	10	7	17	44	5	1	0	1	0
1973–74	Toronto Toros	WHA	74	33	20	53	27	12	4	1	5	5
1974–75	Toronto Toros	WHA	70	52	28	80	48	5	1	1	2	0
1975–76	Toronto Toros	WHA	73	20	21	41	15	—	—	—	—	—
1976–77	Birmingham Bulls	WHA	25	7	6	13	10	—	—	—	—	—
1976–77	Edmonton Oilers	WHA	15	3	2	5	16	—	—	—	—	—
WHA totals			314	125	84	209	160	22	6	2	8	5
