= List of WHA players with 50-goal seasons =

In the history of the World Hockey Association, nineteen different players scored 50 goals in a season. The most scorers to obtain 50 goals was six with the 1974-75 WHA season and the 1975-76 season. Only five players in the history of the WHA from 1972 to 1979 recorded multiple 50-goal seasons. Bobby Hull, Anders Hedberg, and Réal Cloutier had the most 50 goal seasons with four while Cloutier had the most 60+ goal seasons with three.

Bobby Hull and Anders Hedberg each scored 50 goals in 50 games.

== Players and their 50-goal seasons ==
Key
^ Inducted into the Hockey Hall of Fame
(#) Denotes the consecutive count, only if more than one, that player achieved a 50-goal season

Season	Player	Team	GP	G	Ref
1972–73	Danny Lawson	Philadelphia Blazers	78	61	
1972–73	Tom Webster	New England Whalers	77	53	
1972–73	Bobby Hull (1)	Winnipeg Jets	63	51	
1972–73	Ron Ward	New York Raiders	77	51	
1972–73	Andre Lacroix	Philadelphia Blazers	78	50	
1973–74	Mike Walton	Minnesota Fighting Saints	78	57	
1973–74	Bobby Hull (2)	Winnipeg Jets	75	53	
1973–74	Danny Lawson (2)	Vancouver Blazers	78	50	
1974–75	Bobby Hull (3)	Winnipeg Jets	78	77	
1974–75	Serge Bernier	Quebec Nordiques	76	54	
1974–75	Wayne Rivers	San Diego Mariners	78	54	
1974–75	Anders Hedberg (1)	Winnipeg Jets	65	53	
1974–75	Tom Simpson	Toronto Toros	70	52	
1974–75	Marc Tardif (1)	Michigan Stags/Quebec Nordiques	76	50	
1975–76	Marc Tardif (2)	Quebec Nordiques	81	71	
1975–76	Real Cloutier (1)	Quebec Nordiques	80	60	
1975–76	Vaclav Nedomansky	Toronto Toros	81	56	
1975–76	Bobby Hull (4)	Winnipeg Jets	80	53	
1975–76	Réjean Houle	Quebec Nordiques	81	51	
1975–76	Anders Hedberg (2)	Winnipeg Jets	76	50	
1976–77	Anders Hedberg (3)	Winnipeg Jets	68	70	
1976–77	Real Cloutier (2)	Quebec Nordiques	76	66	
1976–77	Mark Napier	Birmingham Bulls	80	60	
1976–77	Rich LeDuc	Cincinnati Stingers	81	52	
1976–77	Blaine Stoughton	Cincinnati Stingers	81	52	
1977–78	Marc Tardif (3)	Quebec Nordiques	78	65	
1977–78	Anders Hedberg (4)	Winnipeg Jets	77	63	
1977–78	Robbie Ftorek	Cincinnati Stingers	80	59	
1977–78	Real Cloutier (3)	Quebec Nordiques	73	56	
1978–79	Real Cloutier (4)	Quebec Nordiques	77	75	
1978–79	Morris Lukowich	Winnipeg Jets	80	65	

== See also ==
- List of WHA players with 100-point seasons
