= 1988 IIHF European U18 Championship =

Tournament details
- Host country: Czechoslovakia
- Venue(s): 4 (in 1 host city)
- Dates: April 9 – April 17
- Teams: 8

Final positions
- Champions: Czechoslovakia
- Runner-up: Finland
- Third place: Soviet Union
- Fourth place: Sweden

Tournament statistics
- Games played: 24
- Goals scored: 242 (10.08 per game)
- Scoring leader(s): (Finland) Teemu Selänne (16 points)

The 1988 IIHF European U18 Championship was the twenty-first playing of the IIHF European Junior Championships.

== Group A ==
Played April 9–17, 1988, in Frýdek-Místek, Vsetín, Olomouc, and Přerov, Czechoslovakia.

=== First round ===
Group 1

Played in Olomouc and Přerov.

Pos	Team	Pld	W	D	L	GF	GA	GD	Pts	FIN	SWE	SUI	ROM
1	Finland	3	3	0	0	36	4	+32	6		7–3	11–1	18–0
2	Sweden	3	2	0	1	33	11	+22	4	3–7		9–4	21–0
3	Switzerland	3	1	0	2	9	22	−13	2	1–11	4–9		4–2
4	Romania	3	0	0	3	2	43	−41	0	0–18	0–21	2–4	

Group 2

Played in Frýdek-Místek and Vsetín

Pos	Team	Pld	W	D	L	GF	GA	GD	Pts	URS	TCH	NOR	POL
1	Soviet Union	3	3	0	0	27	4	+23	6		6–4	9–0	12–0
2	Czechoslovakia	3	2	0	1	21	7	+14	4	4–6		11–1	6–0
3	Norway	3	1	0	2	8	23	−15	2	0–9	1–11		7–3
4	Poland	3	0	0	3	3	25	−22	0	0–12	0–6	3–7	

=== Final round ===
Championship round

Played in Frýdek-Místek, Vsetín, Olomouc, and Přerov.

Pos	Team	Pld	W	D	L	GF	GA	GD	Pts	TCH	FIN	URS	SWE	NOR	SUI
1	Czechoslovakia	5	4	0	1	36	13	+23	8		5–3	4–6	6–2	11–1	10–1
2	Finland	5	4	0	1	31	12	+19	8	3–5		3–2	7–3	7–1	11–1
3	Soviet Union	5	3	1	1	32	11	+21	7	6–4	2–3		3–3	9–0	12–1
4	Sweden	5	2	1	2	25	22	+3	5	2–6	3–7	3–3		8–2	9–4
5	Norway	5	1	0	4	15	37	−22	2	1–11	1–7	0–9	2–8		11–2
6	Switzerland	5	0	0	5	9	53	−44	0	1–10	1–11	1–12	4–9	2–11	

7th place

Romania	7:3 (3:1, 2:0, 2:2) Přerov	1:6 (0:3, 0:1, 1:2) Vsetín	3:2 s.o. (1:0, 1:2, 0:0, 0:0, 1:0) Přerov	Poland

Poland was relegated to Group B for 1989.

== Tournament Awards ==
- Top Scorer (Finland) Teemu Selänne (16 points)
- Top Goalie: (Finland) Henry Eskelinen
- Top Defenceman: (Soviet Union) Sergei Zubov
- Top Forward: (Finland) Petri Aaltonen

== Group B ==
Played March 26 to April 1, 1988, in Briançon France

=== First round ===
Group 1

Pos	Team	Pld	W	D	L	GF	GA	GD	Pts	FRG	YUG	FRA	NED
1	West Germany	3	3	0	0	16	5	+11	6		8–3	3–2	5–0
2	Yugoslavia	3	2	0	1	15	14	+1	4	3–8		4–3	8–3
3	France	3	1	0	2	16	8	+8	2	2–3	3–4		11–1
4	Netherlands	3	0	0	3	4	24	−20	0	0–5	3–8	1–11	

Group 2

Pos	Team	Pld	W	D	L	GF	GA	GD	Pts	AUT	DEN	ITA	GBR
1	Austria	3	3	0	0	17	3	+14	6		5–0	3–0	9–3
2	Denmark	3	2	0	1	13	7	+6	4	0–5		6–2	7–0
3	Italy	3	0	1	2	5	12	−7	1	0–3	2–6		3–3
4	Great Britain	3	0	1	2	6	19	−13	1	3–9	0–7	3–3	

=== Final round ===
Championship round

Pos	Team	Pld	W	D	L	GF	GA	GD	Pts	FRG	AUT	YUG	DEN
1	West Germany	3	3	0	0	19	4	+15	6		5–1	8–3	6–0
2	Austria	3	1	1	1	8	7	+1	3	1–5		2–2	5–0
3	Yugoslavia	3	1	1	1	10	13	−3	3	3–8	2–2		5–3
4	Denmark	3	0	0	3	3	16	−13	0	0–6	0–5	3–5	

Placing round

Pos	Team	Pld	W	D	L	GF	GA	GD	Pts	ITA	FRA	NED	GBR
1	Italy	3	2	1	0	17	12	+5	5		5–3	9–6	3–3
2	France	3	2	0	1	22	12	+10	4	3–5		11–1	8–6
3	Netherlands	3	1	0	2	14	22	−8	2	6–9	1–11		7–2
4	Great Britain	3	0	1	2	11	18	−7	1	3–3	6–8	2–7	

West Germany was promoted to Group A and Great Britain was relegated to Group C, for 1989.

== Group C ==
Played April 6–9, 1988, in San Sebastián Spain

Pos	Team	Pld	W	D	L	GF	GA	GD	Pts	BUL	ESP	HUN	BEL
1	Bulgaria	3	3	0	0	15	5	+10	6		2–1	4–0	9–4
2	Spain	3	2	0	1	22	11	+11	4	1–2		6–5	15–4
3	Hungary	3	1	0	2	14	11	+3	2	0–4	5–6		9–1
4	Belgium	3	0	0	3	9	33	−24	0	4–9	4–15	1–9	

Bulgaria was promoted to Group B for 1989.
