= Dennis Hull =

Canadian ice hockey player (1944–2026)

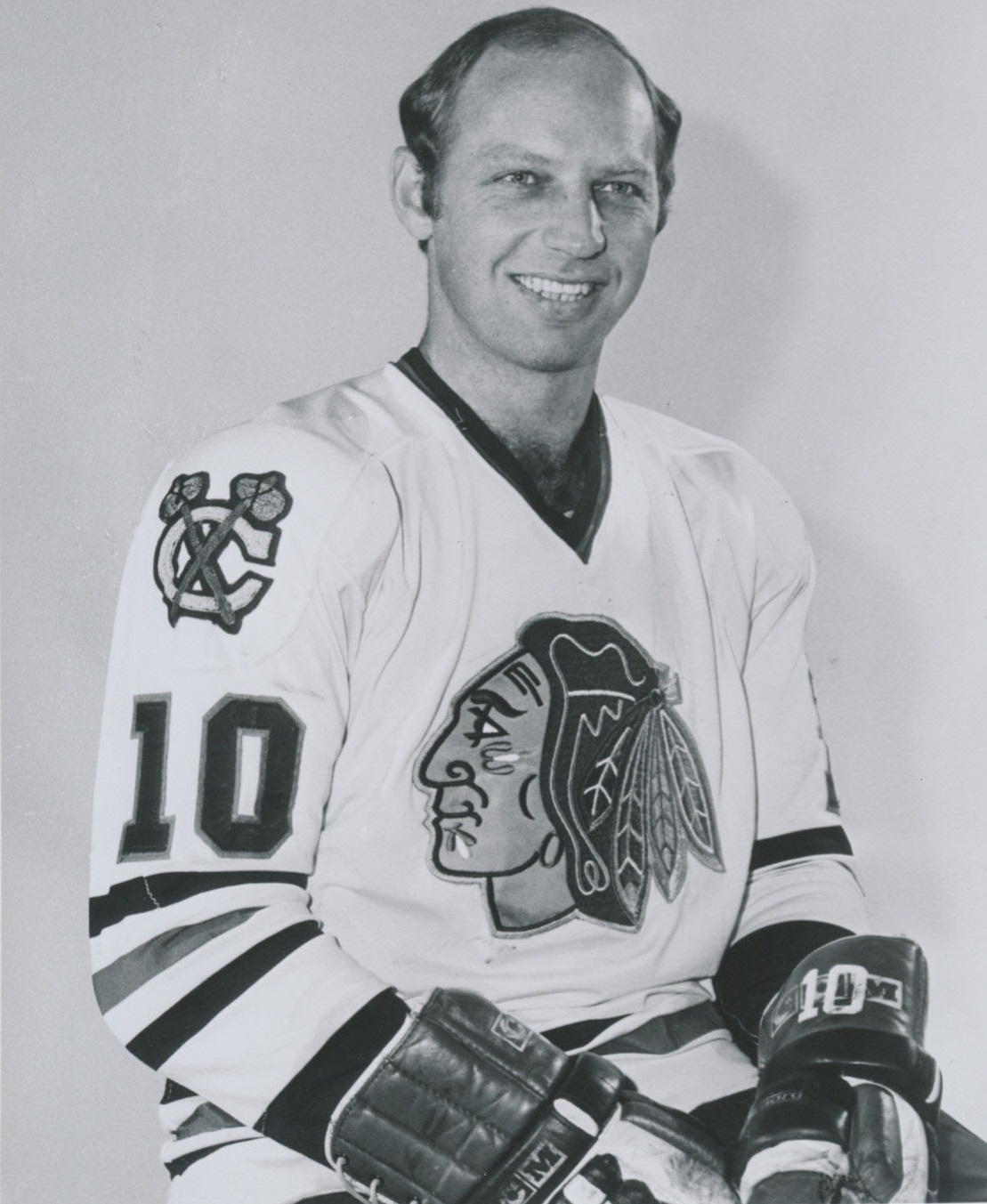
- Hull in 1977
- Born: November 19, 1944 Point Anne, Ontario, Canada
- Died: May 30, 2026 (aged 81) Belleville, Ontario, Canada
- Height: 6 ft 0 in (183 cm)
- Weight: 185 lb (84 kg; 13 st 3 lb)
- Position: Left wing
- Shot: Left
- Played for: Chicago Black Hawks; Detroit Red Wings
- National team: Canada
- Playing career: 1964–1978

Dennis William Hull (November 19, 1944 – May 30, 2026) was a Canadian professional ice hockey left winger who played most of his career for the Chicago Black Hawks of the National Hockey League. He was the brother of Bobby Hull and uncle of Brett Hull and Bart Hull.

== Career ==
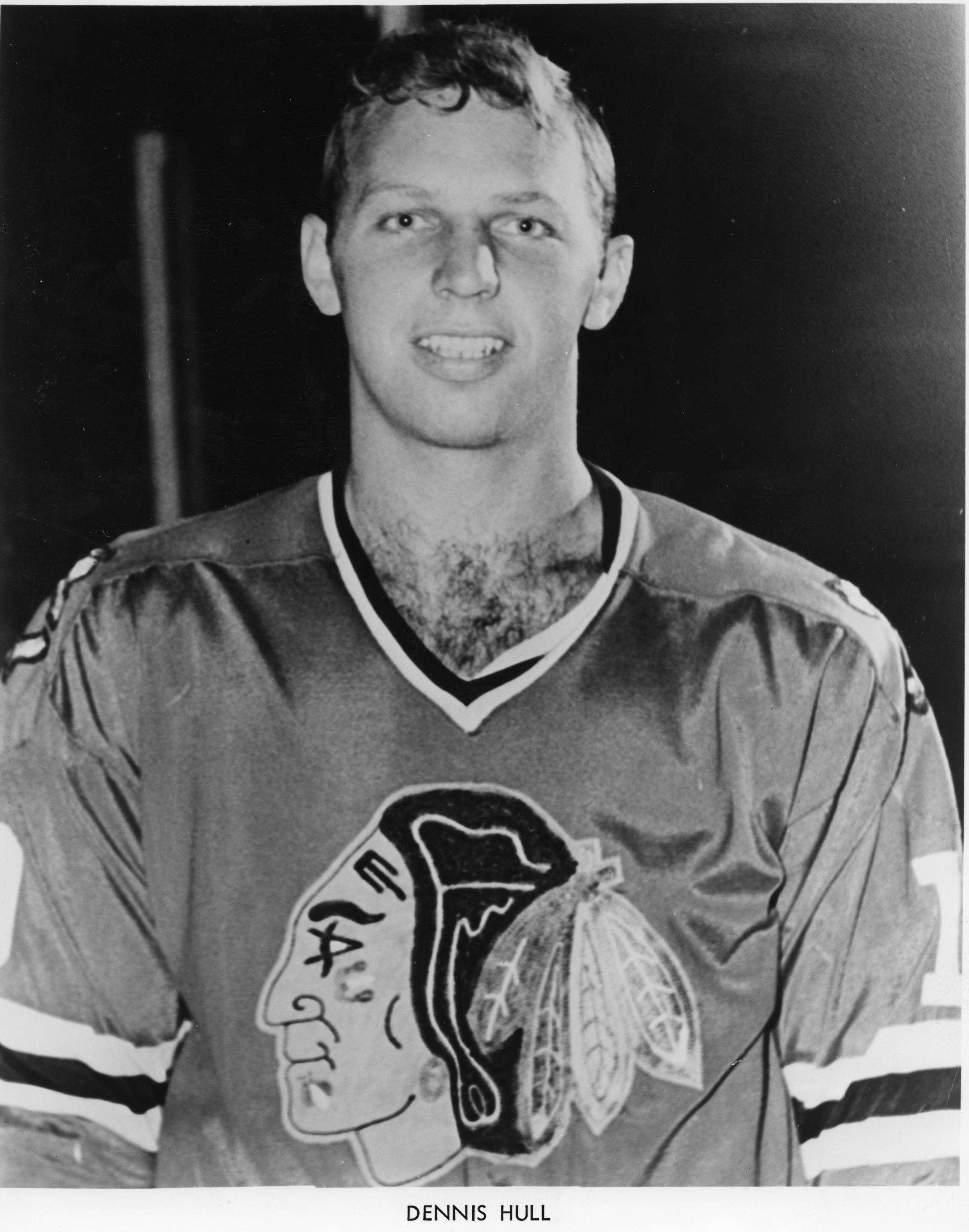
Hull in 1968

As a player, he was in the shadow of his older brother Bobby Hull, where they were both teammates on the Chicago Black Hawks for eight seasons.

Dennis emerged as a star player on his own, scoring over 300 goals in his own right, and earning the nickname "the Silver Jet" (Bobby was known as "the Golden Jet").

When Bobby was excluded from the 1972 Summit Series because he played in the WHA, Dennis initially planned to boycott the event as well as a show of support for his brother, but Bobby persuaded him to stay on Team Canada. During the series, Hull took over for Vic Hadfield at the left wing position on the New York Rangers "Goal A Game" line with Jean Ratelle and Rod Gilbert, managing two goals and two assists in four games.

He was named a Second Team All-Star and played in five NHL All-Star Games. His best years were as part of the "MPH" (pun on 'miles per hour' using each player's last initials) line with centre Pit Martin and right wing Jim Pappin. The line was considered one of the better units in the NHL in the early to mid-1970s. He recorded seasons of 40, 30, 39, and 29 goals from 1971 through 1974. His best season was in 1973 when he recorded 39 goals and 51 assists for 90 points. He was instrumental in Chicago's appearance in the Stanley Cup Finals that season. Hull led the team with 9 goals and 15 assists for 24 points, finishing second in playoff scoring that season.

He played 14 seasons in the National Hockey League, with the Chicago Black Hawks (1964–77) and Detroit Red Wings (1977–78).

=== After hockey ===
Upon retirement as a player, Hull became a broadcaster, as well as an educator, returning to St. Catharines, Ontario, where he had played Ontario Hockey League junior hockey (St. Catharines Teepees 1960–64), to study at Brock University, graduating with a degree in history and physical education. He then taught at Ridley College and subsequently became the athletic director of the Illinois Institute of Technology in Chicago.

Meanwhile, Hull became known as a public speaker and comedian and also continued to operate a cattle farm raising Polled Hereford with his brother Gary in Northumberland County, Ontario. He wrote a book entitled "The Third Best Hull" (ECW Press) which contains memoirs of his hockey career. Hull became good friends with Soviet goaltending legend Vladislav Tretiak, whom he had played against during the 1972 Summit Series, recalling "I told Tretiak that he's become famous for letting in [Henderson's] goal...I said to him that 'if you had stopped it, you'd probably be a cab driver in Moscow today.' "

== Personal life and death ==
Hull was born on November 19, 1944 at Point Anne, Ontario, one of 11 children of Robert and Lena (née Sills) Hull. He was married to Janet, and had a son and a daughter.

Dennis Hull died at a hospital in Belleville, Ontario on May 30, 2026, at the age of 81.

== Accomplishments and awards ==
- OHA-Jr. First All-Star Team (1964)
- NHL Second All-Star Team (1973)
- Played in NHL All-Star Game (1969, 1971, 1972, 1973, 1974)

== Career statistics ==
=== Regular season and playoffs ===
			Regular season					Playoffs
Season	Team	League	GP	G	A	Pts	PIM	GP	G	A	Pts	PIM
1960–61	St. Catharines Teepees	OHA	47	6	4	10	33	6	0	1	1	2
1961–62	St. Catharines Teepees	OHA	50	6	12	18	29	2	0	0	0	0
1962–63	St. Catharines Black Hawks	OHA	50	19	29	48	73	—	—	—	—	—
1963–64	St. Catharines Black Hawks	OHA	55	48	49	97	123	12	4	11	15	50
1964–65	Chicago Black Hawks	NHL	55	10	4	14	18	6	0	0	0	0
1965–66	Chicago Black Hawks	NHL	25	1	5	6	6	3	0	0	0	0
1965–66	St. Louis Braves	CHL	40	11	16	27	14	5	2	1	3	0
1966–67	Chicago Black Hawks	NHL	70	25	17	42	33	6	0	1	1	12
1967–68	Chicago Black Hawks	NHL	74	18	15	33	34	11	1	3	4	6
1968–69	Chicago Black Hawks	NHL	72	30	34	64	25	—	—	—	—	—
1969–70	Chicago Black Hawks	NHL	76	17	35	52	31	8	5	2	7	0
1970–71	Chicago Black Hawks	NHL	78	40	26	66	16	18	7	6	13	2
1971–72	Chicago Black Hawks	NHL	78	30	39	69	10	8	4	2	6	4
1972–73	Chicago Black Hawks	NHL	78	39	51	90	27	16	9	15	24	4
1973–74	Chicago Black Hawks	NHL	74	29	39	68	15	10	6	3	9	0
1974–75	Chicago Black Hawks	NHL	69	16	21	37	10	5	0	2	2	0
1975–76	Chicago Black Hawks	NHL	80	27	39	66	28	4	0	0	0	0
1976–77	Chicago Black Hawks	NHL	75	16	17	33	2	2	1	0	1	0
1977–78	Detroit Red Wings	NHL	55	5	9	14	6	7	0	0	0	2
NHL totals			959	303	351	654	261	104	33	34	67	30

=== International ===
Year	Team	Event	GP	G	A	Pts	PIM
1972	Canada	SS	4	2	2	4	4
Senior totals			4	2	2	4	4
