= Point Anne =

Human settlement in Ontario, Canada

Coordinates: 44°09′27″N 77°17′38″W

Point Anne is a ghost town on the Bay of Quinte approximately four miles east of downtown Belleville, Ontario. It is now part of Belleville. It was the birthplace of hockey greats Bobby Hull and Dennis Hull. Point Anne was established in 1837, and it was home to various cement companies starting with Portland cement in 1905. The final cement plant operated by Lafarge was closed in 1973, and operations transferred to Bath, Ontario. LaFarge still operates a quarry in the area.
