= List of NHL players with 50-goal seasons =

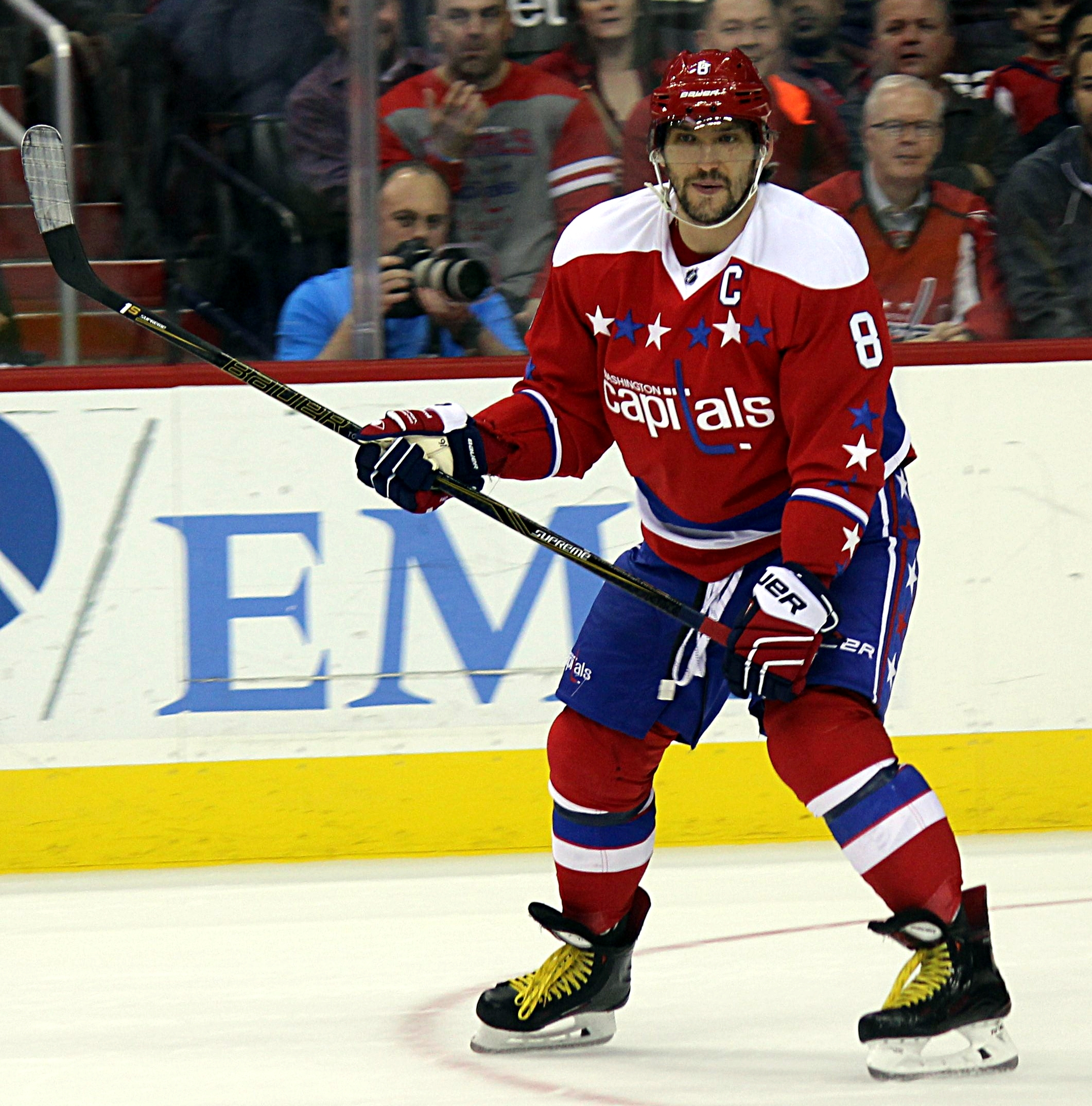
Alexander Ovechkin scored 50 goals for a ninth time in his career during the 2021–22 season. This tied Wayne Gretzky and Mike Bossy for the record of most all-time seasons.

Scoring 50 goals in one season is one of the most celebrated individual achievements in the National Hockey League (NHL). In 1944–45, Maurice Richard became the first player to score 50 goals in a season. Bernie Geoffrion became the second player to reach the milestone 16 years later in 1960–61. Fifty-goal seasons increased in frequency during the 1970s and 1980s as the schedule was extended to 80 games and offense increased across the league. By 1980, it had been reached 24 times in NHL history; the plateau was reached 76 times in the 1980s alone.

Wayne Gretzky scored his 50th goal in his 39th game in 1981–82, the fastest any player has done so. He also shares the record for most 50-goal seasons with Mike Bossy and Alexander Ovechkin, each having reached the milestone nine times in their careers. A record fourteen players exceeded 50 goals in 1992–93, when the schedule was extended to 84 games. After this, offence declined across the league and the schedule was reduced back to the present 82 games, and with these developments the number of players to reach the total declined.

Since 1969–70, there have been four completed 82-game NHL seasons (the first being 1998–99) in which no player scored fifty goals, in addition to no player scoring fifty goals in any of the four seasons of play shortened by lockouts or the COVID-19 pandemic.

As of completion of the 2025–26 season, 101 different players have scored 50 goals in an NHL season one or more times in their career, doing so a combined 212 times.

== History ==
Joe Malone scored 44 goals for the Montreal Canadiens in the NHL's inaugural season of 1917–18—a season with a twenty-game schedule. It was a record that stood nearly 30 years. The introduction of the centre red line and permission of forward passing out of the defensive zone in 1943 increased scoring; six players scored 30 goals in 1943–44, the first time in league history so many players reached that total in one season. Maurice Richard averaged a goal per game for Montreal in 1944–45 and surpassed Malone's record of 44 late in the season. He was as obsessed with reaching the 50-goal mark as his opponents were with preventing it. Richard faced opponents who repeatedly elbowed, hooked and held him in an effort to prevent him from reaching 50. As a result, he scored only seven goals in his final 13 games. Richard scored his 50th goal, in 50 games, in the third period of Montreal's final game of the season against the Boston Bruins. The league introduced the Maurice "Rocket" Richard Trophy in his honour in 1999, and the Canadiens donated the physical trophy.

Richard's mark stood untouched for 16 seasons until Bernie Geoffrion became the second player to score 50 goals in 1960–61, also for Montreal, doing so in his 62nd game of the season (and the Canadiens' 68th). Early in the 1960s, Chicago Black Hawks teammates Stan Mikita and Bobby Hull began experimenting with curved blades, noticing that different bends made shots more unpredictable for goaltenders. Mikita led the NHL in scoring four times using a curved blade, while Hull became the third player in NHL history to score 50 goals in 1961–62. It was the first of five times he would reach the milestone.

While playing for Boston in the 1970s, Phil Esposito scored 50 goals in five consecutive seasons, led by a then-NHL record 76 goals in 1970–71. By 1980, 24 players had reached the mark. Mike Bossy of the New York Islanders joined Richard as the second man in NHL history to score 50 goals in 50 games in 1980–81. He did so by scoring two goals in the final five minutes of the Islanders' 50th game. Bossy, who had set a league rookie-scoring record with 53 goals in 1977–78, surpassed the 50-goal mark in each of his first nine NHL seasons. The 1980s represented one of the highest scoring eras in NHL history: on 76 occasions, a player scored 50 goals in a season. Wayne Gretzky was responsible for nine of those occasions, including his league-record 92 goals in 1981–82. In that season, Gretzky scored five goals in his 39th game of the season to total 50, bettering Richard and Bossy by 11 games as the fastest to reach the mark.

Bossy, Gretzky, and Alexander Ovechkin are tied for the most 50-goal seasons, with nine each. Bossy holds the record for most consecutive 50-goal seasons with nine. Ovechkin is still an active player.

A record three players from the same team, the Edmonton Oilers, had a 50-goal season in 1983–84, with Gretzky, Glenn Anderson, and Jari Kurri; the Oilers, with the same three players, would match the record in 1985–86. The Oilers also hold the record for most seasons, five, with multiple players achieving a 50-goal season; the Los Angeles Kings are second, with four seasons with multiple 50-goal scorers.

A record 14 players scored 50 goals in 1992–93, the same season that a record 21 players reached the 100-point plateau. Among the 50-goal scorers that season was Teemu Selanne, who scored 76 goals as a rookie, surpassing Bossy's record for first-year players by 23 goals. The next season, 1993–94, Brett Hull achieved his fifth 50-goal season, matching father Bobby's five 50-goal seasons three decades earlier; the two are the only father-son pair to each achieve a 50-goal season, let alone achieving it five times each.

As teams shifted their focus to defensive play rather than offensive, scoring rapidly declined in the late 1990s. No player scored 50 in 1998–99, the first time that had happened in 29 years, excluding the lockout-shortened 1994–95 NHL season.

Only five players reached the 50-goal mark between 1999 and 2004: Pavel Bure, Joe Sakic, Jaromir Jagr, Jarome Iginla, and Milan Hejduk. Following the 2004–05 lockout that cancelled the season, the league introduced numerous rule changes designed to increase scoring. While five players scored 50 in 2005–06, scoring immediately fell off thereafter, with only 15 marks of 50-goals over the next 12 years (contrast that to 14 different 50-goal scorers in 1992–93 alone). Starting with the minor spike in 2005–06, the most prolific 50-goal scorer in the past 16 seasons (to 2021–22) is Alexander Ovechkin, reaching 50 goals in 9 of those seasons, including four seasons where he was the only 50-goal scorer: 2008–09, 2013–14, 2014–15 and 2015–16. Ovechkin is the oldest player to record a 50-goal season at 36 years and 215 days old; the previous oldest was Johnny Bucyk at 35 years and 308 days old.

== Players and their 50-goal seasons ==
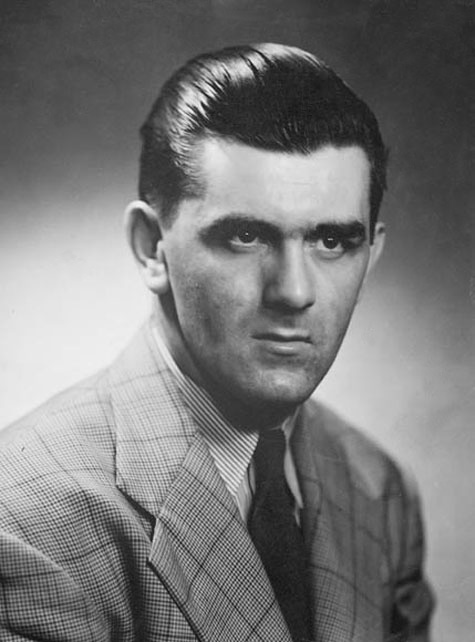
Maurice "Rocket" Richard was the NHL's first 50-goal scorer.

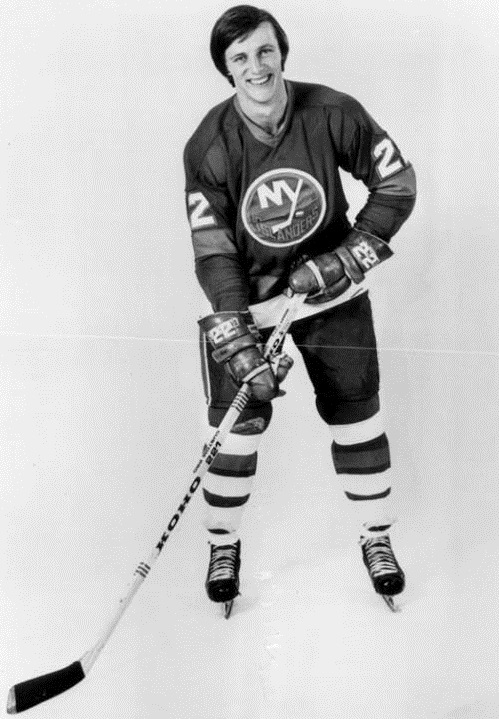
Mike Bossy had a record nine consecutive 50-goal seasons.

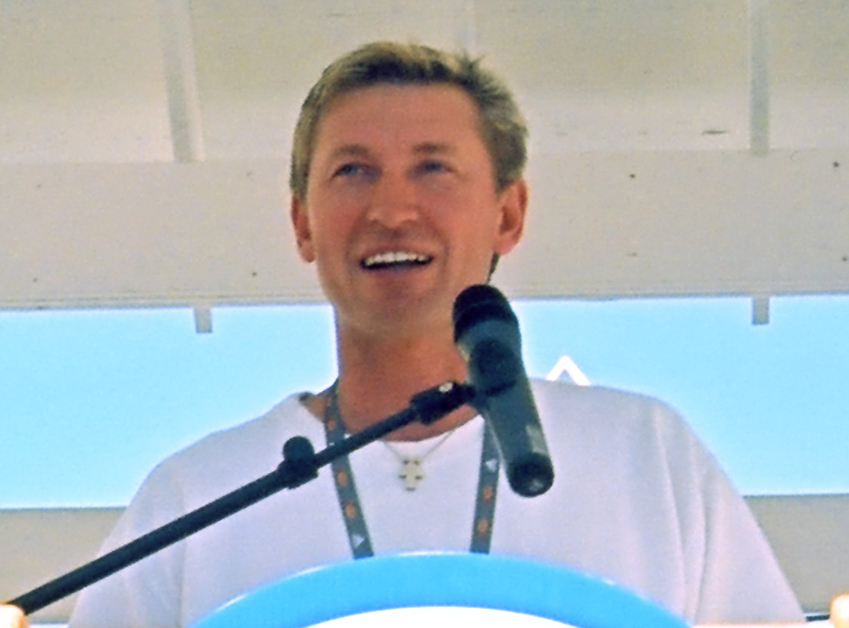
Wayne Gretzky had nine 50-goal seasons in his career, a record shared with Bossy and Ovechkin. Gretzky has the top two goal-scoring seasons, with 92 in 1981–82 and 87 in 1983–84.

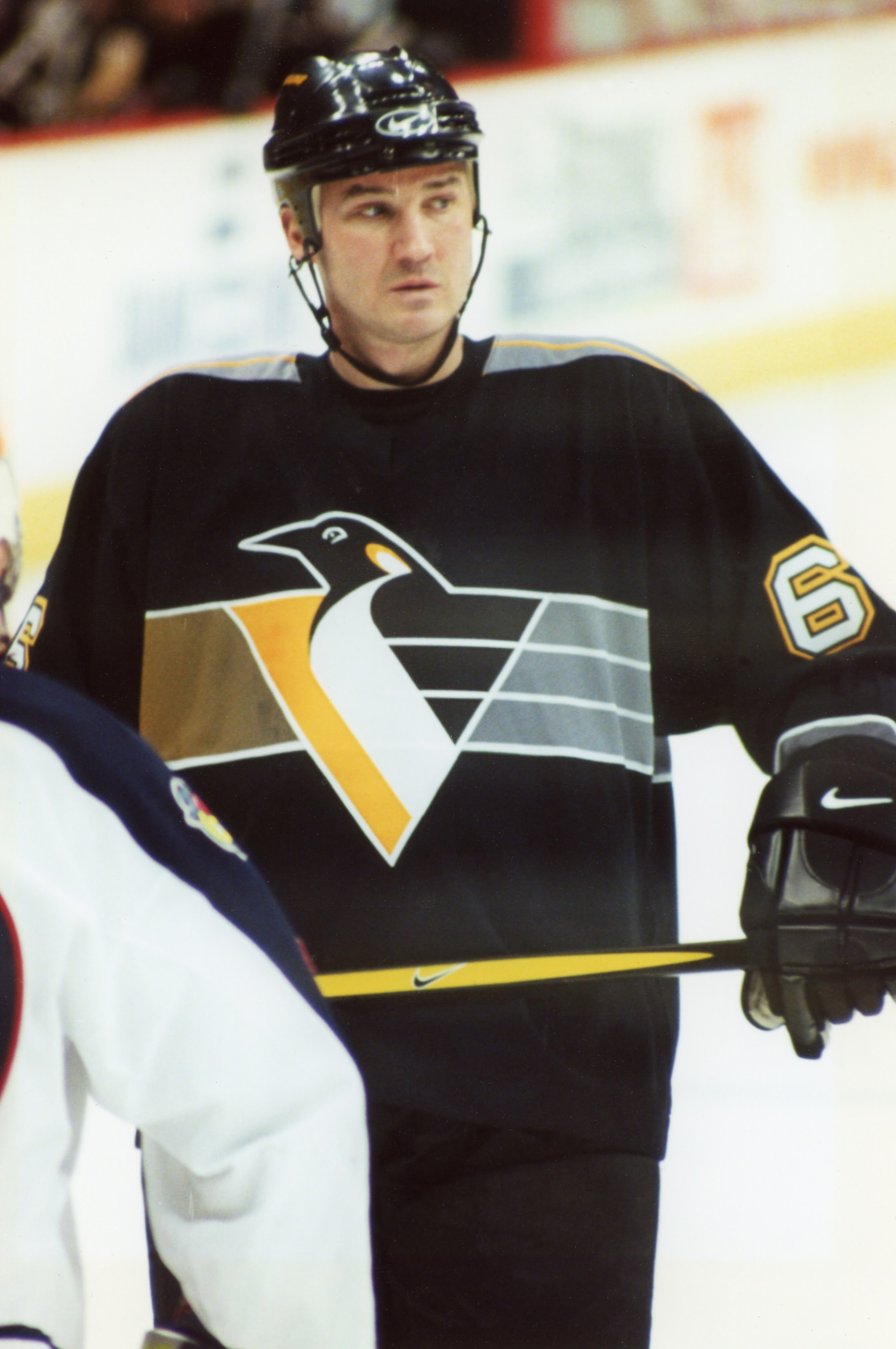
Mario Lemieux had six seasons with 50 or more goals, peaking at 85 in 1988–89.

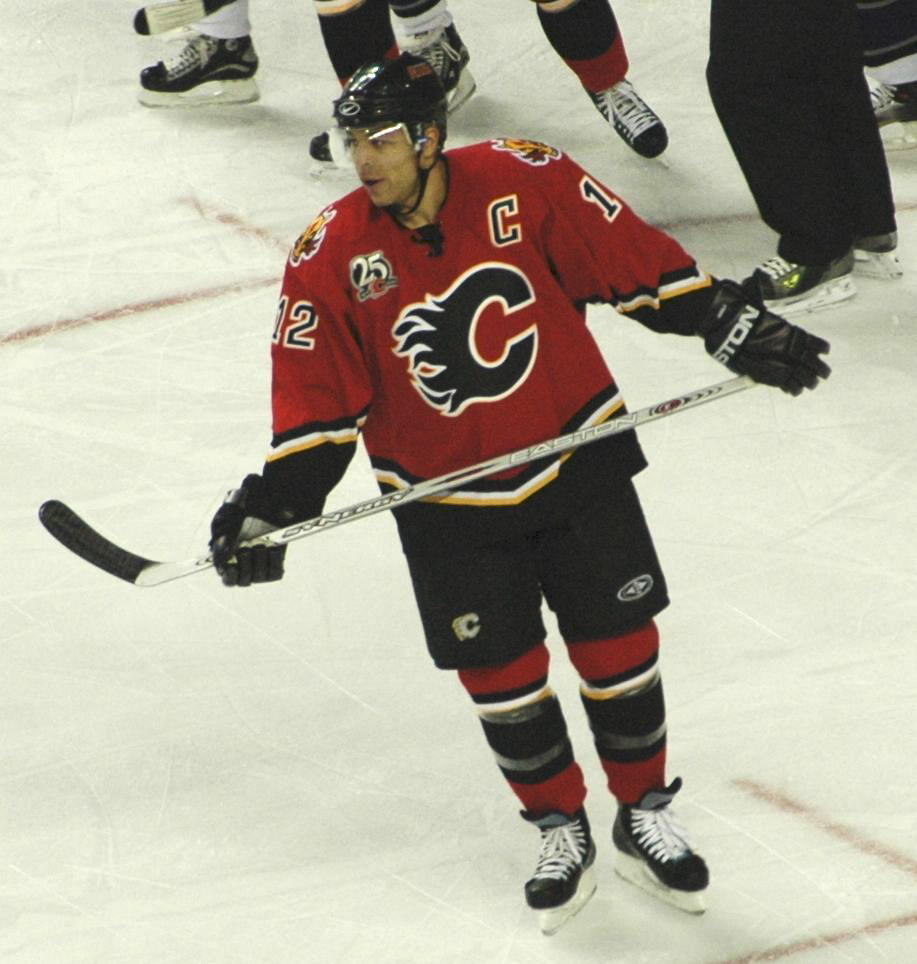
Jarome Iginla had two 50-goal seasons: 2001–02 and 2007–08.

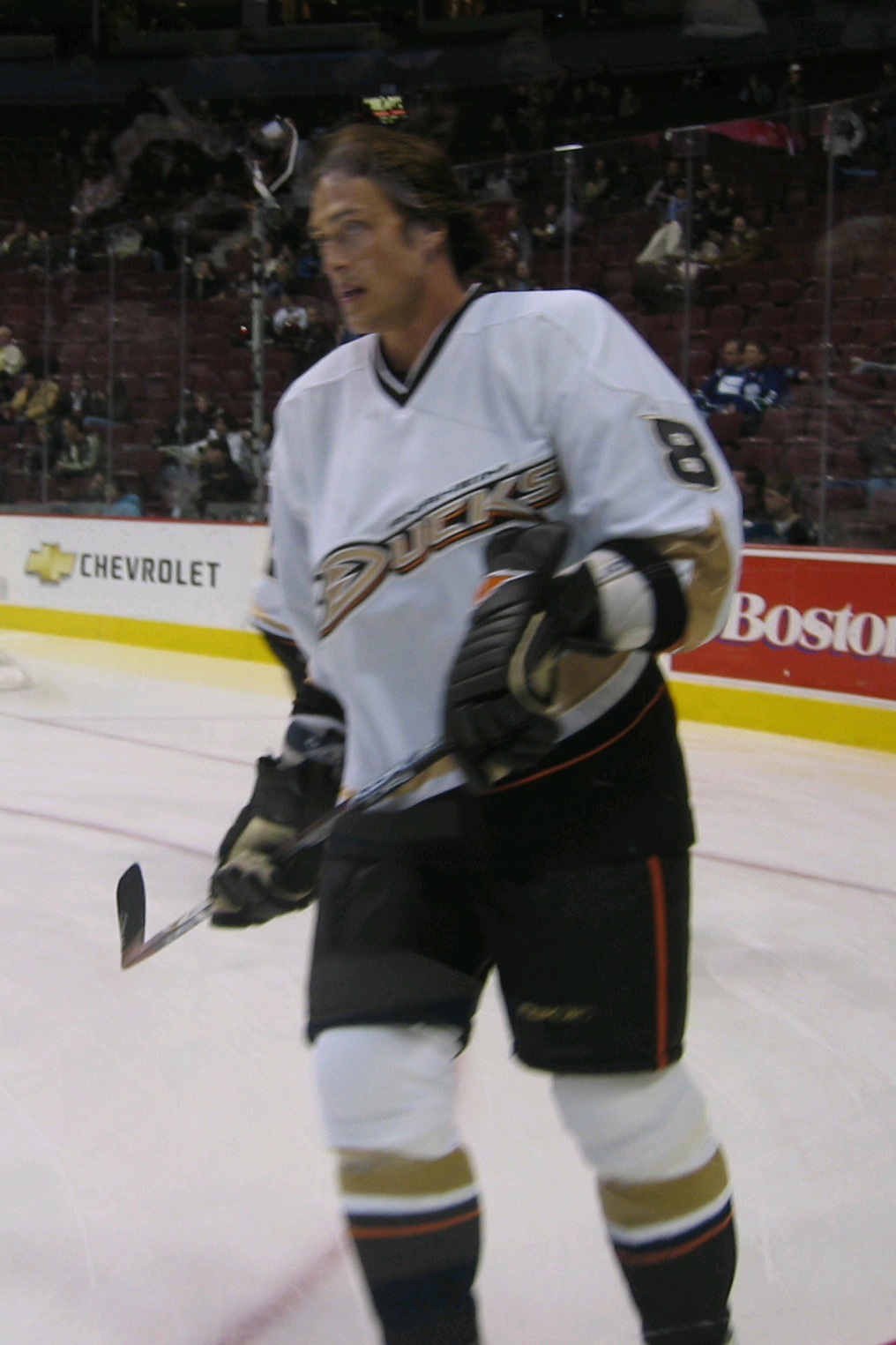
Teemu Selanne set an NHL rookie record with 76 goals in 1992–93.

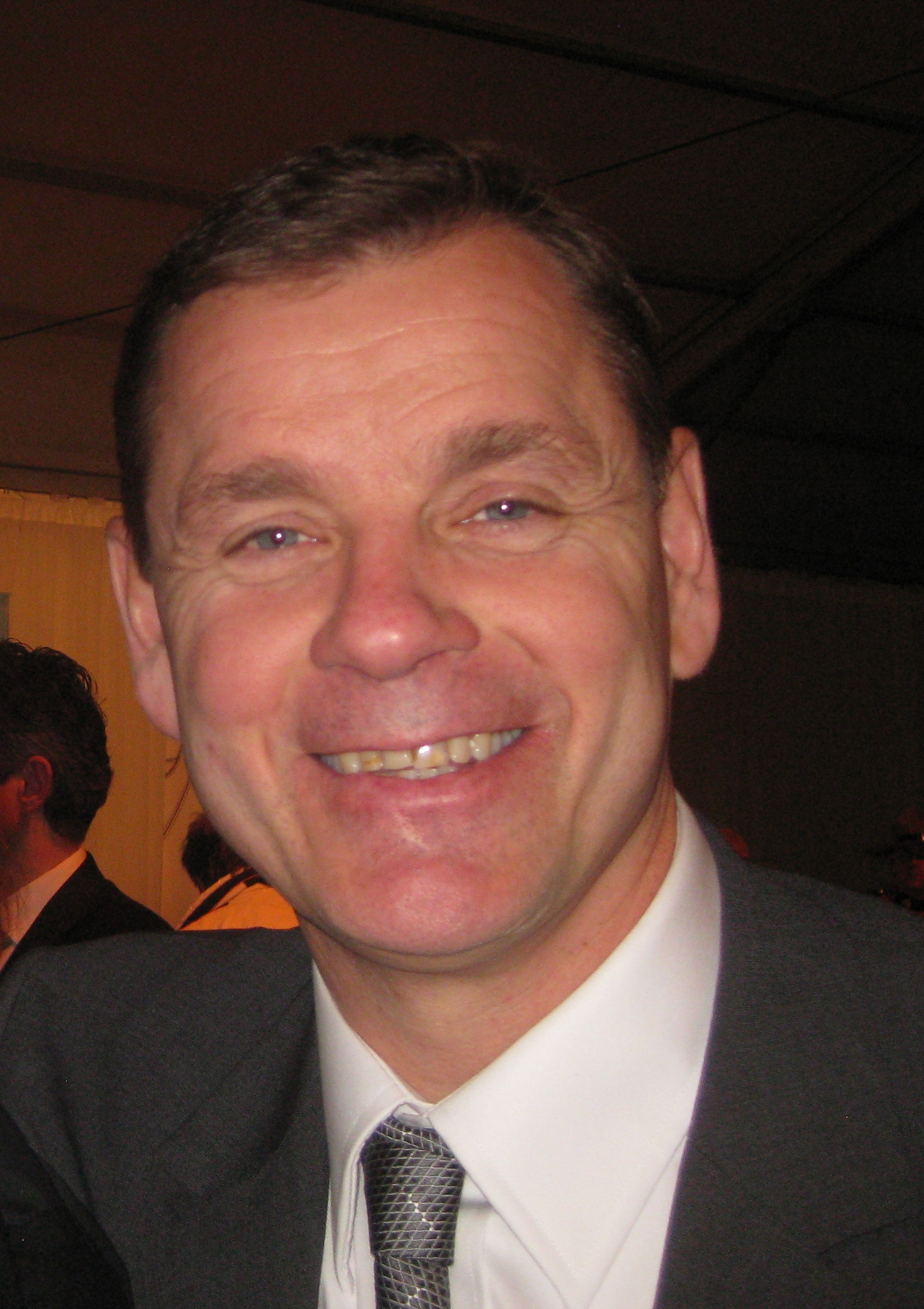
Hakan Loob became the first Swede to score 50 goals in one season in 1987–88.

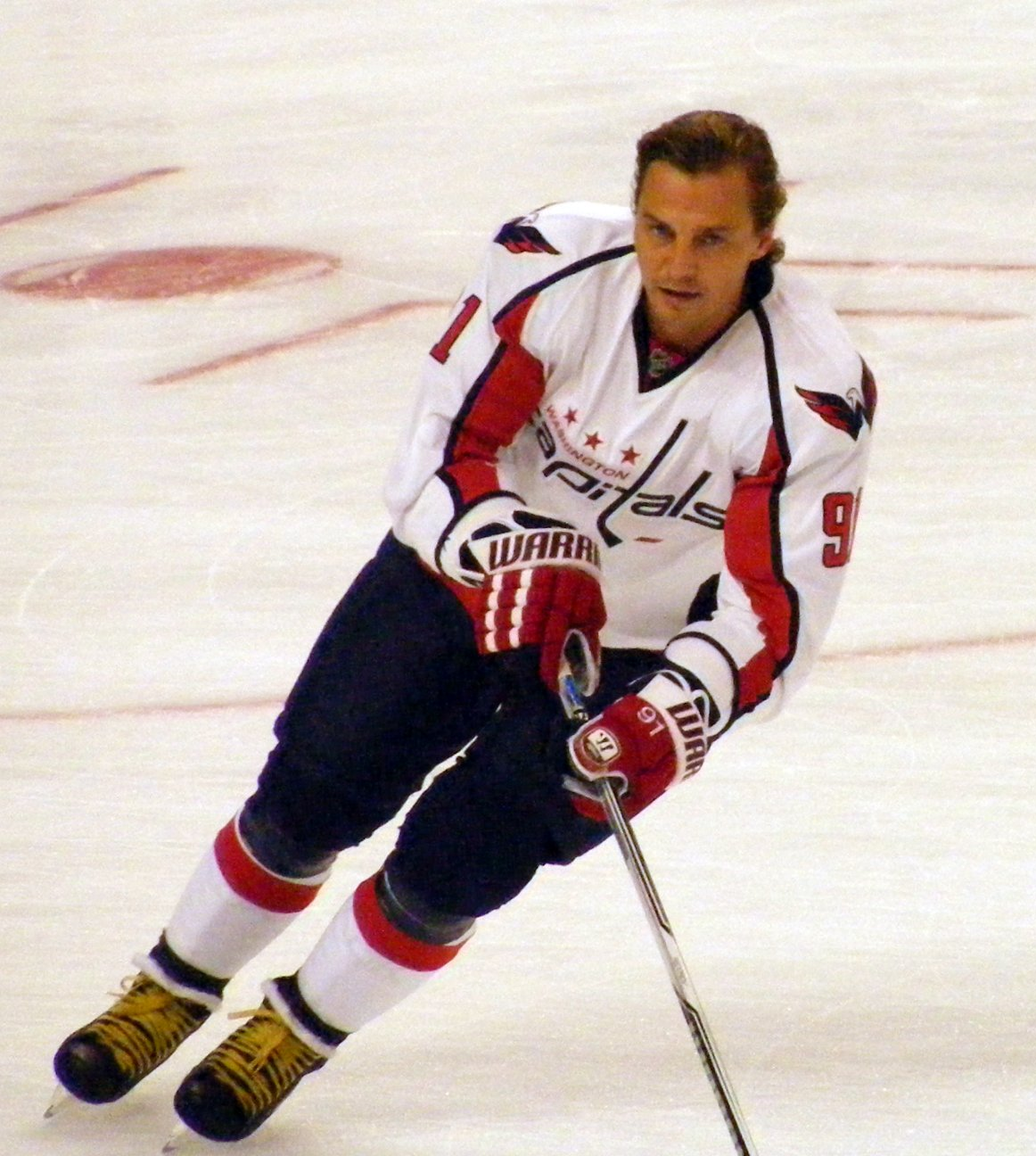
Sergei Fedorov scored 56 goals in 1993–94.

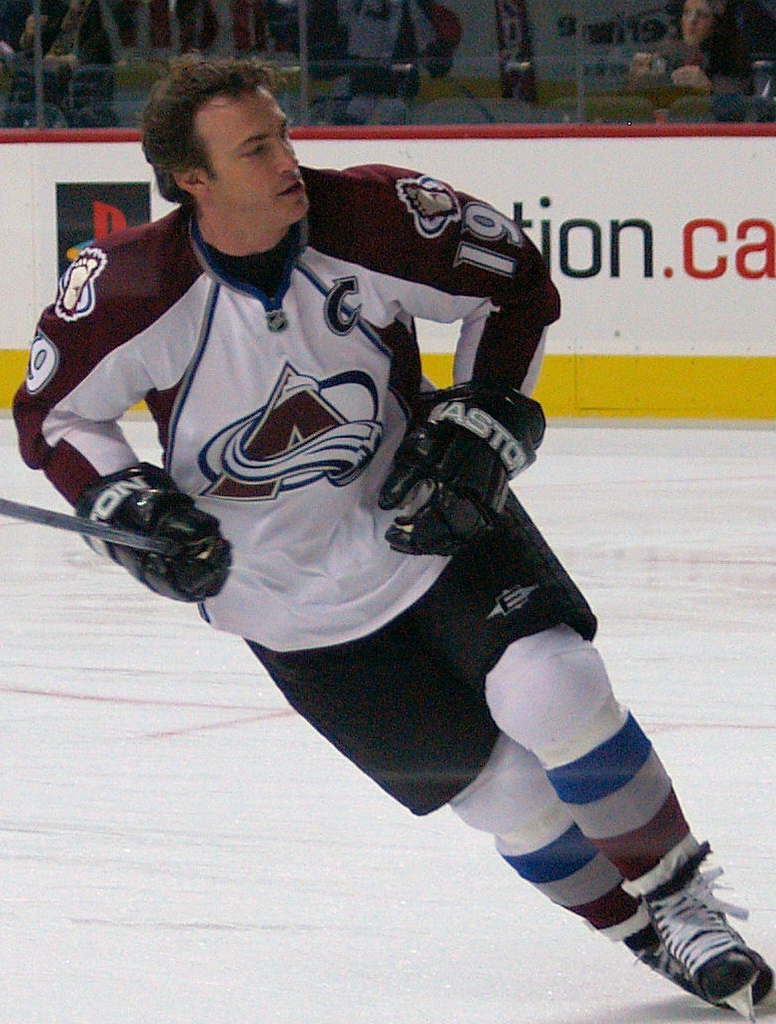
Joe Sakic reached the 50-goal mark twice, scoring 51 goals in 1995–96 and 54 in 2000–01.

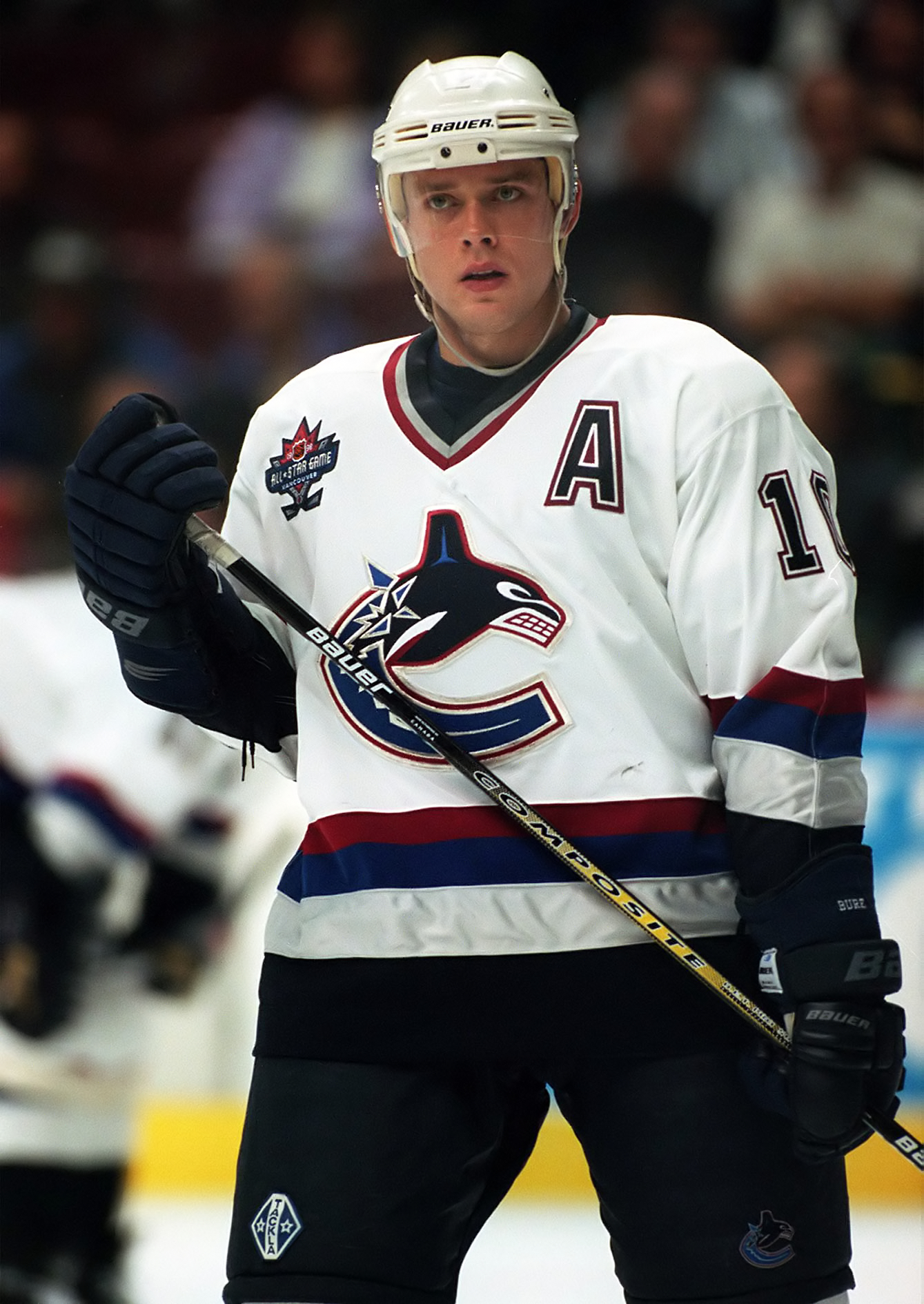
Pavel Bure topped 50 goals with both Vancouver and Florida.

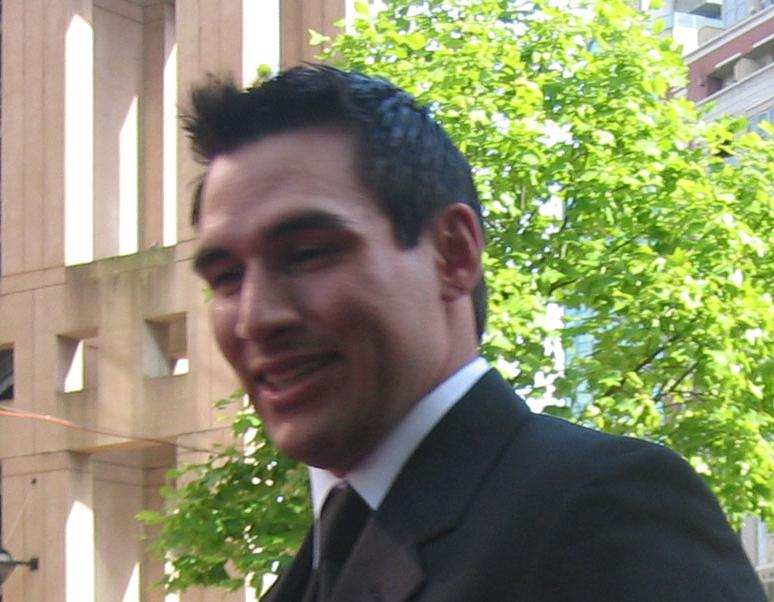
Jonathan Cheechoo led the NHL with 56 goals in 2005–06.

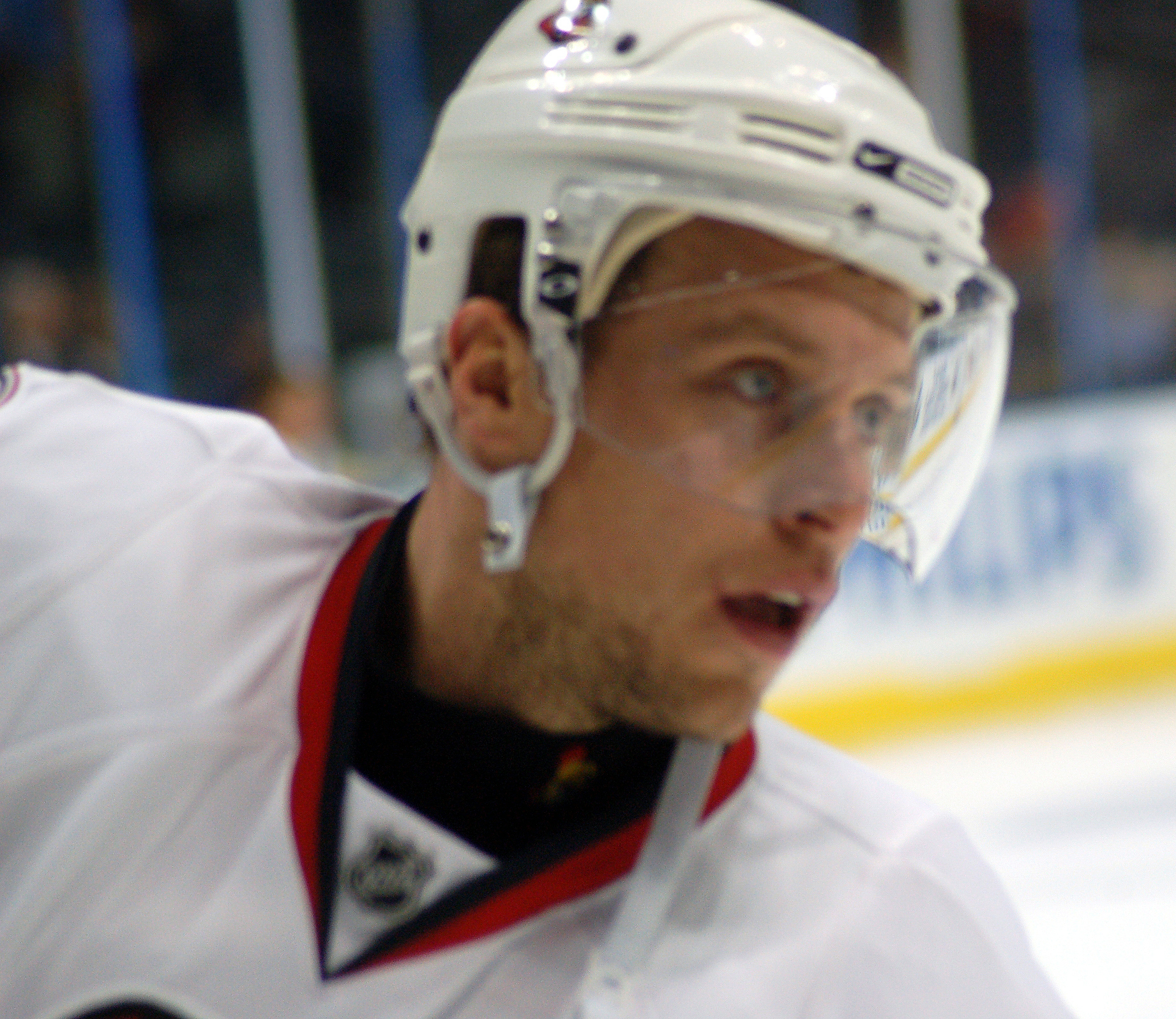
Dany Heatley topped 50 goals twice with the Ottawa Senators, scoring 50 in both 2005–06 and 2006–07.

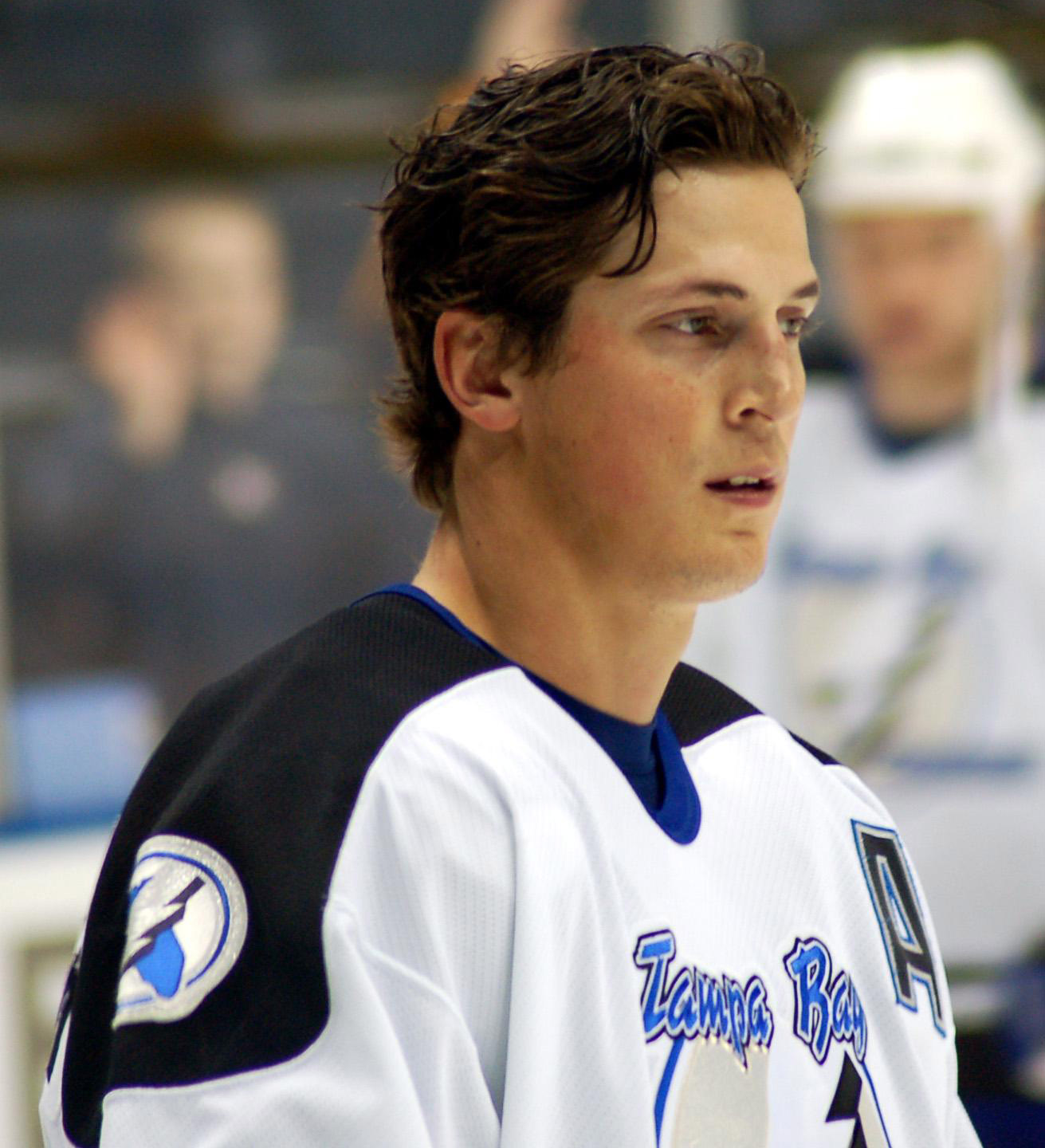
Vincent Lecavalier scored 52 goals in 2006–07.

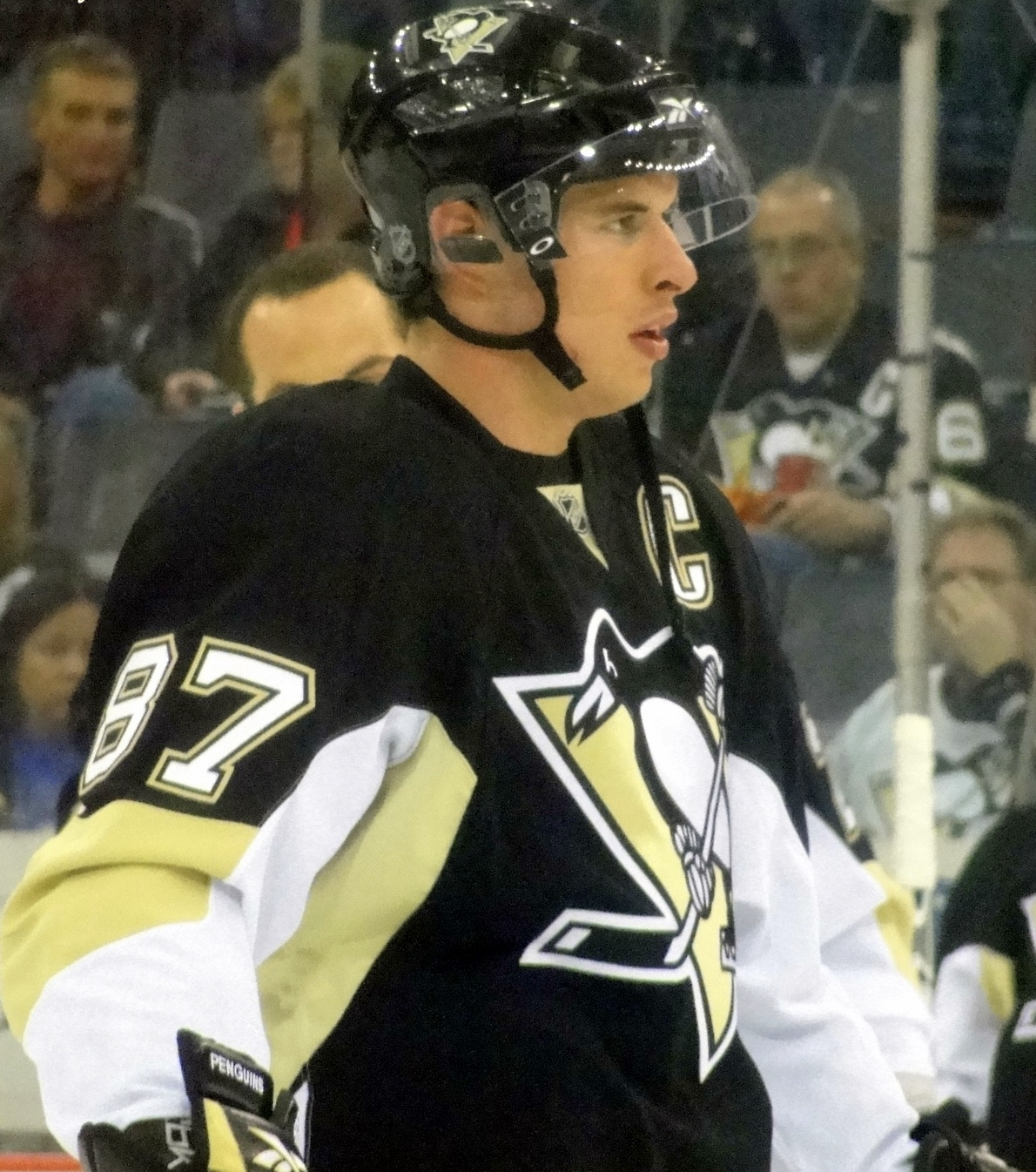
Sidney Crosby scored 51 goals in 2009–10

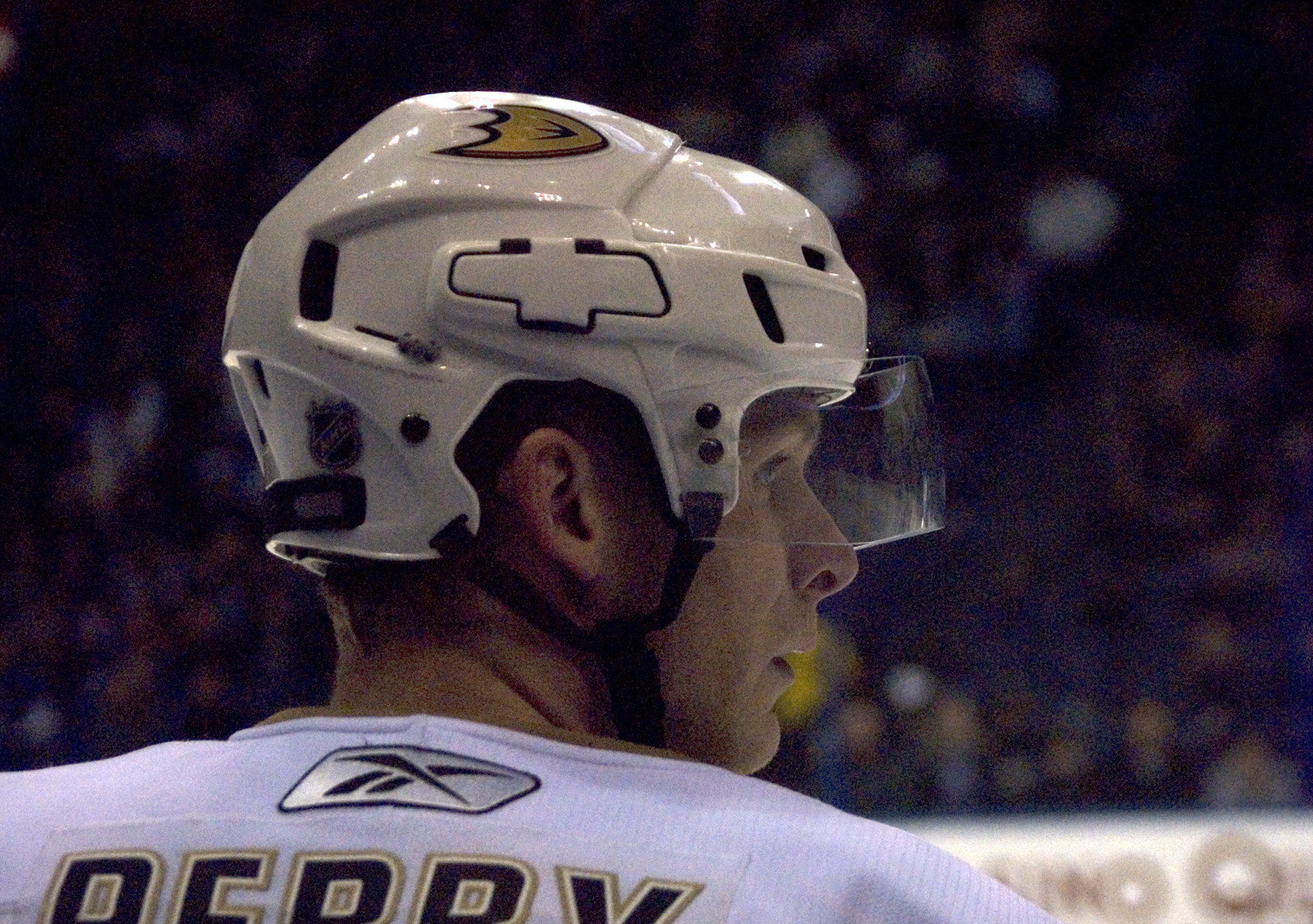
Corey Perry recorded a league-leading 50 goals in 2010–11

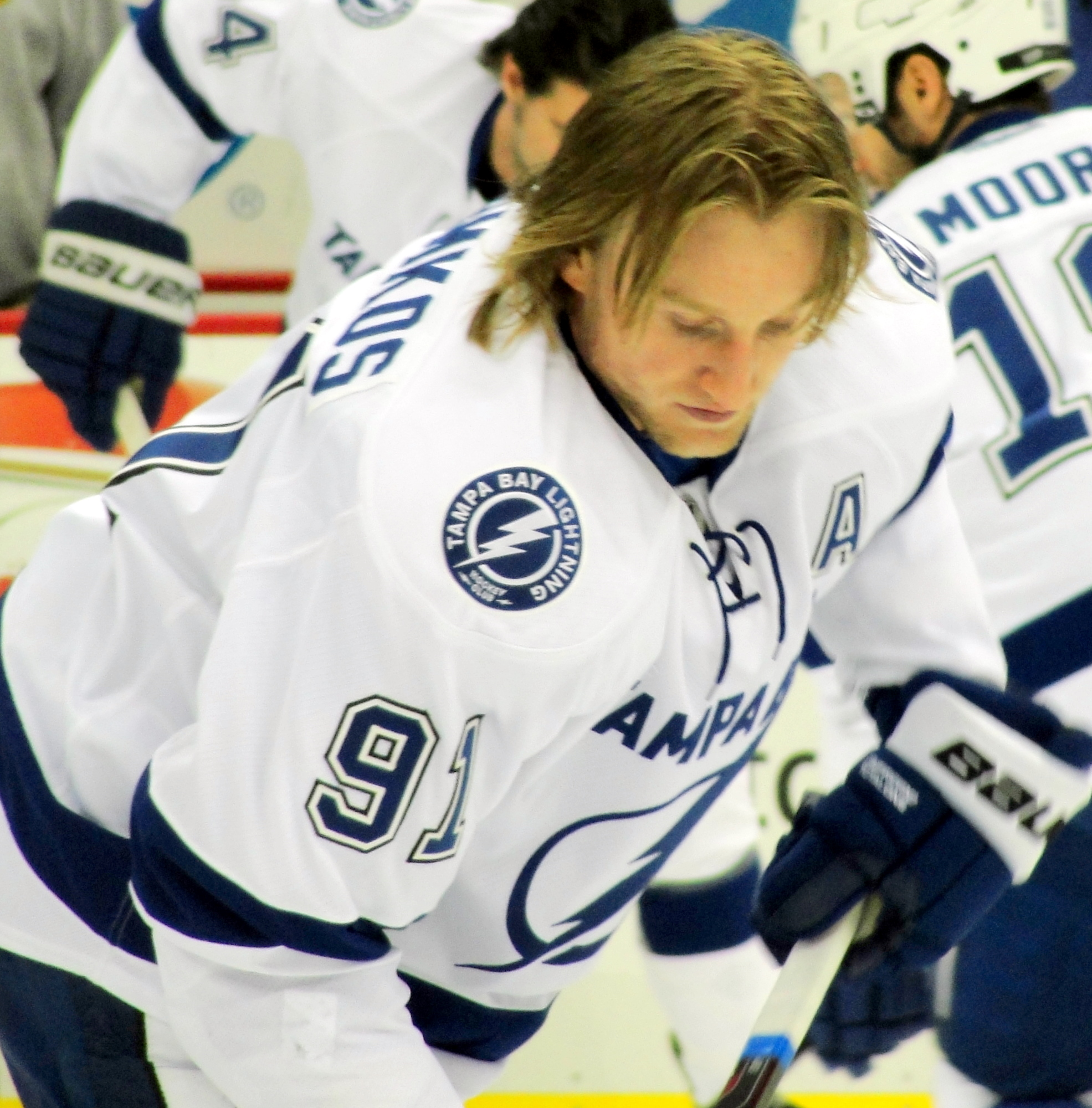
Steven Stamkos scored 51 goals in 2009–10 and 60 in 2011–12

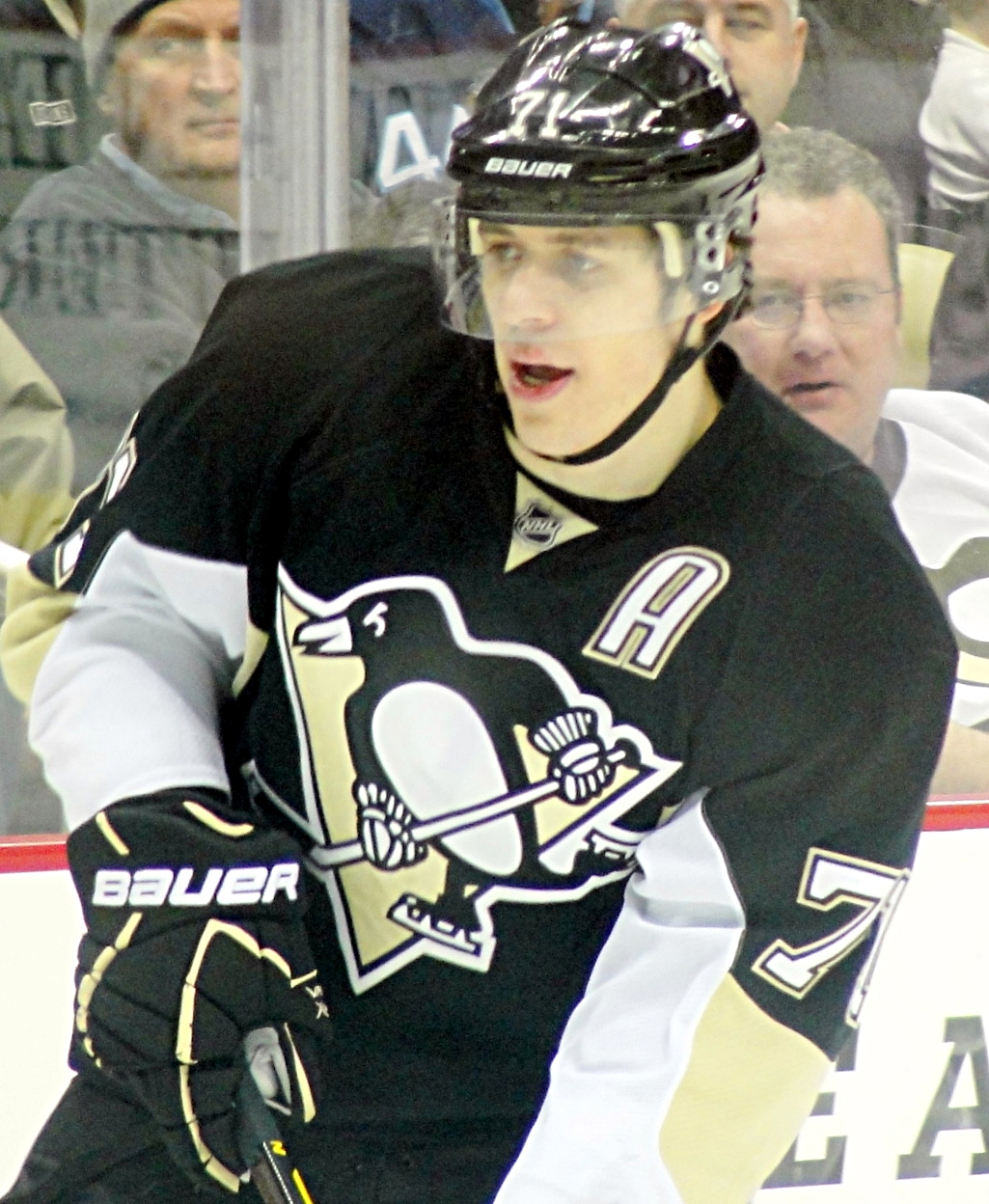
Evgeni Malkin scored 50 goals in 2011–12.

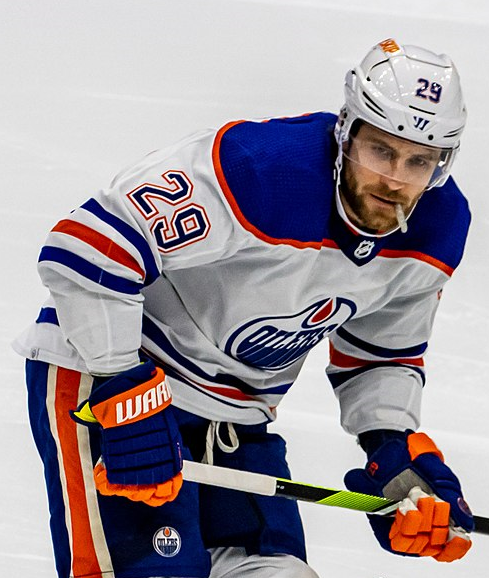
Leon Draisaitl scored 50 goals for the first time in 2018–19.

Key
* Player is active in the NHL in 2025–26
^ Inducted into the Hockey Hall of Fame
(#) Denotes the consecutive count, only if more than one, that player achieved a 50-goal season

Season	Player	Team	GP	G	Ref
1944–45	Maurice Richard^	Montreal Canadiens	50	50	
1960–61	Bernie Geoffrion^	Montreal Canadiens	64	50	
1961–62	Bobby Hull^ (1)	Chicago Black Hawks	70	50	
1965–66	Bobby Hull^ (2)	Chicago Black Hawks	65	54	
1966–67	Bobby Hull^ (3)	Chicago Black Hawks	66	52	
1968–69	Bobby Hull^ (4)	Chicago Black Hawks	74	58	
1970–71	Phil Esposito^ (1)	Boston Bruins	78	76	
1970–71	Johnny Bucyk^	Boston Bruins	78	51	
1971–72	Phil Esposito^ (2)	Boston Bruins	76	66	
1971–72	Vic Hadfield	New York Rangers	78	50	
1971–72	Bobby Hull^ (5)	Chicago Black Hawks	78	50	
1972–73	Phil Esposito^ (3)	Boston Bruins	78	55	
1972–73	Mickey Redmond (1)	Detroit Red Wings	76	52	
1972–73	Rick MacLeish	Philadelphia Flyers	78	50	
1973–74	Phil Esposito^ (4)	Boston Bruins	78	68	
1973–74	Rick Martin (1)	Buffalo Sabres	78	52	
1973–74	Mickey Redmond (2)	Detroit Red Wings	76	51	
1973–74	Ken Hodge	Boston Bruins	76	50	
1974–75	Phil Esposito^ (5)	Boston Bruins	79	61	
1974–75	Guy Lafleur^ (1)	Montreal Canadiens	70	53	
1974–75	Rick Martin (2)	Buffalo Sabres	68	52	
1974–75	Danny Grant	Detroit Red Wings	80	50	
1975–76	Reggie Leach (1)	Philadelphia Flyers	80	61	
1975–76	Guy Lafleur^ (2)	Montreal Canadiens	80	56	
1975–76	Pierre Larouche (1)	Pittsburgh Penguins	76	53	
1975–76	Jean Pronovost	Pittsburgh Penguins	80	52	
1975–76	Danny Gare (1)	Buffalo Sabres	79	50	
1975–76	Bill Barber^	Philadelphia Flyers	80	50	
1976–77	Steve Shutt^	Montreal Canadiens	80	60	
1976–77	Guy Lafleur^ (3)	Montreal Canadiens	80	56	
1976–77	Marcel Dionne^ (1)	Los Angeles Kings	80	53	
1977–78	Guy Lafleur^ (4)	Montreal Canadiens	78	60	
1977–78	Mike Bossy^ (1)	New York Islanders	73	53	
1978–79	Mike Bossy^ (2)	New York Islanders	80	69	
1978–79	Marcel Dionne^ (2)	Los Angeles Kings	80	59	
1978–79	Guy Lafleur^ (5)	Montreal Canadiens	80	52	
1978–79	Guy Chouinard	Atlanta Flames	80	50	
1979–80	Charlie Simmer (1)	Los Angeles Kings	64	56	
1979–80	Danny Gare (2)	Buffalo Sabres	76	56	
1979–80	Blaine Stoughton (1)	Hartford Whalers	80	56	
1979–80	Marcel Dionne^ (3)	Los Angeles Kings	80	53	
1979–80	Mike Bossy^ (3)	New York Islanders	75	51	
1979–80	Wayne Gretzky^ (1)	Edmonton Oilers	79	51	
1979–80	Pierre Larouche (2)	Montreal Canadiens	73	50	
1979–80	Guy Lafleur^ (6)	Montreal Canadiens	74	50	
1979–80	Reggie Leach (2)	Philadelphia Flyers	76	50	
1980–81	Mike Bossy^ (4)	New York Islanders	79	68	
1980–81	Marcel Dionne^ (4)	Los Angeles Kings	80	58	
1980–81	Charlie Simmer (2)	Los Angeles Kings	65	56	
1980–81	Wayne Gretzky^ (2)	Edmonton Oilers	80	55	
1980–81	Rick Kehoe	Pittsburgh Penguins	80	55	
1980–81	Wayne Babych	St. Louis Blues	78	54	
1980–81	Jacques Richard	Quebec Nordiques	78	52	
1980–81	Dennis Maruk (1)	Washington Capitals	80	50	
1981–82	Wayne Gretzky^ (3)	Edmonton Oilers	80	92	
1981–82	Mike Bossy^ (5)	New York Islanders	80	64	
1981–82	Dennis Maruk (2)	Washington Capitals	80	60	
1981–82	Dino Ciccarelli^ (1)	Minnesota North Stars	76	55	
1981–82	Rick Vaive (1)	Toronto Maple Leafs	77	54	
1981–82	Blaine Stoughton (2)	Hartford Whalers	80	52	
1981–82	Rick Middleton	Boston Bruins	75	51	
1981–82	Marcel Dionne^ (5)	Los Angeles Kings	78	50	
1981–82	Mark Messier^	Edmonton Oilers	78	50	
1981–82	Bryan Trottier^	New York Islanders	80	50	
1982–83	Wayne Gretzky^ (4)	Edmonton Oilers	80	71	
1982–83	Lanny McDonald^	Calgary Flames	80	66	
1982–83	Mike Bossy^ (6)	New York Islanders	79	60	
1982–83	Michel Goulet^ (1)	Quebec Nordiques	80	57	
1982–83	Marcel Dionne^ (6)	Los Angeles Kings	80	56	
1982–83	Al Secord	Chicago Black Hawks	80	54	
1982–83	Rick Vaive (2)	Toronto Maple Leafs	78	51	
1983–84	Wayne Gretzky^ (5)	Edmonton Oilers	74	87	
1983–84	Michel Goulet^ (2)	Quebec Nordiques	75	56	
1983–84	Tim Kerr (1)	Philadelphia Flyers	79	54	
1983–84	Glenn Anderson^ (1)	Edmonton Oilers	80	54	
1983–84	Jari Kurri^ (1)	Edmonton Oilers	64	52	
1983–84	Rick Vaive (3)	Toronto Maple Leafs	76	52	
1983–84	Mike Bossy^ (7)	New York Islanders	67	51	
1983–84	Mike Bullard	Pittsburgh Penguins	76	51	
1984–85	Wayne Gretzky^ (6)	Edmonton Oilers	80	73	
1984–85	Jari Kurri^ (2)	Edmonton Oilers	73	71	
1984–85	Mike Bossy^ (8)	New York Islanders	76	58	
1984–85	Michel Goulet^ (3)	Quebec Nordiques	69	55	
1984–85	John Ogrodnick	Detroit Red Wings	79	55	
1984–85	Tim Kerr (2)	Philadelphia Flyers	74	54	
1984–85	Bobby Carpenter	Washington Capitals	80	53	
1984–85	Dale Hawerchuk^	Winnipeg Jets	80	53	
1984–85	Mike Gartner^	Washington Capitals	80	50	
1985–86	Jari Kurri^ (3)	Edmonton Oilers	78	68	
1985–86	Mike Bossy^ (9)	New York Islanders	80	61	
1985–86	Tim Kerr (3)	Philadelphia Flyers	76	58	
1985–86	Glenn Anderson^ (2)	Edmonton Oilers	72	54	
1985–86	Michel Goulet^ (4)	Quebec Nordiques	75	53	
1985–86	Wayne Gretzky^ (7)	Edmonton Oilers	80	52	
1986–87	Wayne Gretzky^ (8)	Edmonton Oilers	79	62	
1986–87	Tim Kerr (4)	Philadelphia Flyers	75	58	
1986–87	Mario Lemieux^ (1)	Pittsburgh Penguins	63	54	
1986–87	Jari Kurri^ (4)	Edmonton Oilers	79	54	
1986–87	Dino Ciccarelli^ (2)	Minnesota North Stars	80	52	
1987–88	Mario Lemieux^ (2)	Pittsburgh Penguins	77	70	
1987–88	Craig Simpson	Pittsburgh Penguins/Edmonton Oilers	80	56	
1987–88	Jimmy Carson	Los Angeles Kings	80	55	
1987–88	Luc Robitaille^ (1)	Los Angeles Kings	80	53	
1987–88	Joe Nieuwendyk^ (1)	Calgary Flames	75	51	
1987–88	Steve Yzerman^ (1)	Detroit Red Wings	64	50	
1987–88	Stephane Richer (1)	Montreal Canadiens	72	50	
1987–88	Hakan Loob	Calgary Flames	80	50	
1988–89	Mario Lemieux^ (3)	Pittsburgh Penguins	76	85	
1988–89	Bernie Nicholls	Los Angeles Kings	79	70	
1988–89	Steve Yzerman^ (2)	Detroit Red Wings	80	65	
1988–89	Wayne Gretzky^ (9)	Los Angeles Kings	78	54	
1988–89	Joe Nieuwendyk^ (2)	Calgary Flames	77	51	
1988–89	Joe Mullen^	Calgary Flames	79	51	
1989–90	Brett Hull^ (1)	St. Louis Blues	80	72	
1989–90	Steve Yzerman^ (3)	Detroit Red Wings	79	62	
1989–90	Cam Neely^ (1)	Boston Bruins	76	55	
1989–90	Brian Bellows	Minnesota North Stars	80	55	
1989–90	Pat LaFontaine^ (1)	New York Islanders	74	54	
1989–90	Luc Robitaille^ (2)	Los Angeles Kings	80	52	
1989–90	Stephane Richer (2)	Montreal Canadiens	75	51	
1989–90	Gary Leeman	Toronto Maple Leafs	80	51	
1990–91	Brett Hull^ (2)	St. Louis Blues	78	86	
1990–91	Cam Neely^ (2)	Boston Bruins	69	51	
1990–91	Theoren Fleury	Calgary Flames	79	51	
1990–91	Steve Yzerman^ (4)	Detroit Red Wings	80	51	
1991–92	Brett Hull^ (3)	St. Louis Blues	73	70	
1991–92	Kevin Stevens (1)	Pittsburgh Penguins	80	54	
1991–92	Gary Roberts	Calgary Flames	76	53	
1991–92	Jeremy Roenick^ (1)	Chicago Blackhawks	80	53	
1992–93	Alexander Mogilny (1)	Buffalo Sabres	77	76	
1992–93	Teemu Selanne^ (1)	Winnipeg Jets	84	76	
1992–93	Mario Lemieux^ (4)	Pittsburgh Penguins	60	69	
1992–93	Luc Robitaille^ (3)	Los Angeles Kings	84	63	
1992–93	Pavel Bure^ (1)	Vancouver Canucks	83	60	
1992–93	Pierre Turgeon^	New York Islanders	83	58	
1992–93	Steve Yzerman^ (5)	Detroit Red Wings	84	58	
1992–93	Kevin Stevens (2)	Pittsburgh Penguins	72	55	
1992–93	Brett Hull^ (4)	St. Louis Blues	80	54	
1992–93	Dave Andreychuk^ (1)	Buffalo Sabres/Toronto Maple Leafs	83	54	
1992–93	Pat LaFontaine^ (2)	Buffalo Sabres	84	53	
1992–93	Mark Recchi^	Philadelphia Flyers	84	53	
1992–93	Brendan Shanahan^ (1)	St. Louis Blues	71	51	
1992–93	Jeremy Roenick^ (2)	Chicago Blackhawks	84	50	
1993–94	Pavel Bure^ (2)	Vancouver Canucks	76	60	
1993–94	Brett Hull^ (5)	St. Louis Blues	81	57	
1993–94	Sergei Fedorov^	Detroit Red Wings	82	56	
1993–94	Dave Andreychuk^ (2)	Toronto Maple Leafs	83	53	
1993–94	Brendan Shanahan^ (2)	St. Louis Blues	81	52	
1993–94	Ray Sheppard	Detroit Red Wings	82	52	
1993–94	Adam Graves	New York Rangers	84	52	
1993–94	Cam Neely^ (3)	Boston Bruins	49	50	
1993–94	Mike Modano^	Dallas Stars	76	50	
1995–96	Mario Lemieux^ (5)	Pittsburgh Penguins	70	69	
1995–96	Jaromir Jagr (1)	Pittsburgh Penguins	82	62	
1995–96	Alexander Mogilny (2)	Vancouver Canucks	79	55	
1995–96	Peter Bondra (1)	Washington Capitals	67	52	
1995–96	John LeClair (1)	Philadelphia Flyers	82	51	
1995–96	Joe Sakic^ (1)	Colorado Avalanche	82	51	
1995–96	Keith Tkachuk^ (1)	Winnipeg Jets	76	50	
1995–96	Paul Kariya^	Mighty Ducks of Anaheim	82	50	
1996–97	Keith Tkachuk^ (2)	Phoenix Coyotes	81	52	
1996–97	Teemu Selanne^ (2)	Mighty Ducks of Anaheim	78	51	
1996–97	Mario Lemieux^ (6)	Pittsburgh Penguins	76	50	
1996–97	John LeClair (2)	Philadelphia Flyers	82	50	
1997–98	Teemu Selanne^ (3)	Mighty Ducks of Anaheim	73	52	
1997–98	Peter Bondra (2)	Washington Capitals	76	52	
1997–98	Pavel Bure^ (3)	Vancouver Canucks	82	51	
1997–98	John LeClair (3)	Philadelphia Flyers	82	51	
1999–2000	Pavel Bure^ (4)	Florida Panthers	74	58	
2000–01	Pavel Bure^ (5)	Florida Panthers	82	59	
2000–01	Joe Sakic^ (2)	Colorado Avalanche	82	54	
2000–01	Jaromir Jagr (2)	Pittsburgh Penguins	81	52	
2001–02	Jarome Iginla^ (1)	Calgary Flames	82	52	
2002–03	Milan Hejduk	Colorado Avalanche	82	50	
2005–06	Jonathan Cheechoo	San Jose Sharks	82	56	
2005–06	Jaromir Jagr (3)	New York Rangers	82	54	
2005–06	Ilya Kovalchuk (1)	Atlanta Thrashers	78	52	
2005–06	Alexander Ovechkin* (1)	Washington Capitals	81	52	
2005–06	Dany Heatley (1)	Ottawa Senators	82	50	
2006–07	Vincent Lecavalier	Tampa Bay Lightning	82	52	
2006–07	Dany Heatley (2)	Ottawa Senators	82	50	
2007–08	Alexander Ovechkin* (2)	Washington Capitals	82	65	
2007–08	Ilya Kovalchuk (2)	Atlanta Thrashers	79	52	
2007–08	Jarome Iginla^ (2)	Calgary Flames	82	50	
2008–09	Alexander Ovechkin* (3)	Washington Capitals	79	56	
2009–10	Sidney Crosby*	Pittsburgh Penguins	81	51	
2009–10	Steven Stamkos* (1)	Tampa Bay Lightning	82	51	
2009–10	Alexander Ovechkin* (4)	Washington Capitals	72	50	
2010–11	Corey Perry*	Anaheim Ducks	82	50	
2011–12	Steven Stamkos* (2)	Tampa Bay Lightning	82	60	
2011–12	Evgeni Malkin*	Pittsburgh Penguins	75	50	
2013–14	Alexander Ovechkin* (5)	Washington Capitals	78	51	
2014–15	Alexander Ovechkin* (6)	Washington Capitals	81	53	
2015–16	Alexander Ovechkin* (7)	Washington Capitals	79	50	
2018–19	Alexander Ovechkin* (8)	Washington Capitals	81	51	
2018–19	Leon Draisaitl* (1)	Edmonton Oilers	82	50	
2021–22	Auston Matthews* (1)	Toronto Maple Leafs	73	60	
2021–22	Leon Draisaitl* (2)	Edmonton Oilers	80	55	
2021–22	Chris Kreider*	New York Rangers	81	52	
2021–22	Alexander Ovechkin* (9)	Washington Capitals	77	50	
2022–23	Connor McDavid*	Edmonton Oilers	82	64	
2022–23	David Pastrnak*	Boston Bruins	82	61	
2022–23	Mikko Rantanen*	Colorado Avalanche	82	55	
2022–23	Leon Draisaitl* (3)	Edmonton Oilers	80	52	
2022–23	Brayden Point*	Tampa Bay Lightning	82	51	
2023–24	Auston Matthews* (2)	Toronto Maple Leafs	81	69	
2023–24	Sam Reinhart*	Florida Panthers	82	57	
2023–24	Zach Hyman*	Edmonton Oilers	80	54	
2023–24	Nathan MacKinnon*	Colorado Avalanche	82	51	
2024–25	Leon Draisaitl* (4)	Edmonton Oilers	71	52	
2025–26	Nathan MacKinnon* (2)	Colorado Avalanche	80	53	
2025–26	Cole Caufield*	Montreal Canadiens	81	51	
