= Bobby Hull =

Canadian ice hockey player (1939–2023)

Bobby Hull OC
- Hockey Hall of Fame, 1983
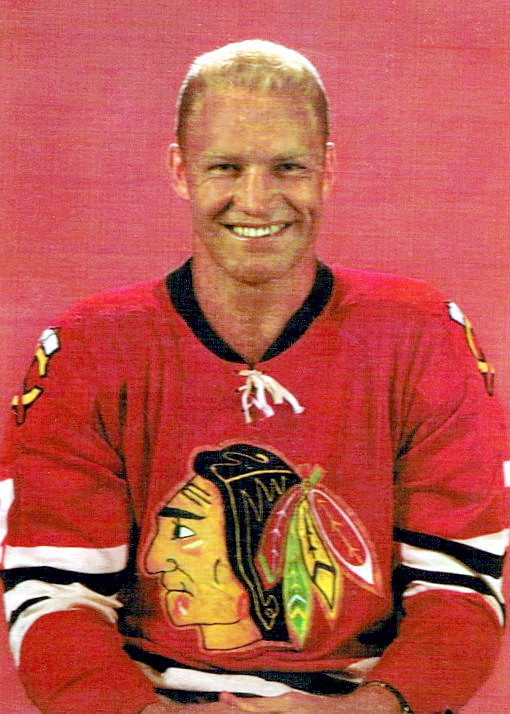
- Hull with the Chicago Black Hawks during the 1960-61 season.
- Born: January 3, 1939 Point Anne, Ontario, Canada
- Died: January 30, 2023 (aged 84) Wheaton, Illinois, U.S.
- Height: 5 ft 10 in (178 cm)
- Weight: 191 lb (87 kg; 13 st 9 lb)
- Position: Left wing
- Shot: Left
- Played for: Chicago Black Hawks; Winnipeg Jets; Hartford Whalers
- National team: Canada
- Playing career: 1957–1980
- Website: www.bobbyhull.ca
Medal record
Representing Canada
Ice hockey
Canada Cup
Gold medal – first place	1976 Canada

Robert Marvin Hull (January 3, 1939 – January 30, 2023) was a Canadian professional ice hockey player who is widely regarded as one of the greatest players of all time. His blond hair, skating speed, end-to-end rushes, and ability to shoot the puck at very high velocity all earned him the nickname "the Golden Jet". His talents were such that an opposing player was often assigned just to shadow him.

During his 23-year playing career, from 1957 to 1980, he played in both the National Hockey League (NHL) and World Hockey Association (WHA) with the Chicago Black Hawks, Winnipeg Jets, and Hartford Whalers. He won the Hart Memorial Trophy as the NHL's most valuable player twice and the Art Ross Trophy as the NHL's leading point scorer three times, while helping the Black Hawks win the Stanley Cup in 1961. He also led the WHA's Winnipeg Jets to Avco Cup championships in 1976 and 1978. He led the NHL in goals seven times, the second most of any player in history, and led the WHA in goals one additional time while being the WHA's most valuable player two times; his 77 goals scored in the 1974–75 WHA season was the most in league history.

He was elected to the Hockey Hall of Fame in 1983, the Ontario Sports Hall of Fame in 1997, and received the Wayne Gretzky International Award in 2003. In 2017 Hull was named one of the '100 Greatest NHL Players' in history.

== Early life ==
Hull was born in Point Anne, Ontario, on January 3, 1939. He was the son of Lena Cook and Robert Edward Hull, a cement company foreman. He played his minor hockey in nearby Belleville, and then Junior B hockey for the Woodstock Warriors in the fall of 1954. Hull led the Warriors to the 1955 Sutherland Cup as Ontario champions. Later, he played for the Galt Black Hawks and the St. Catharines Teepees in the Ontario Hockey Association, before joining the Chicago Black Hawks in 1957 at the age of 18.

== Playing career ==
=== NHL career ===
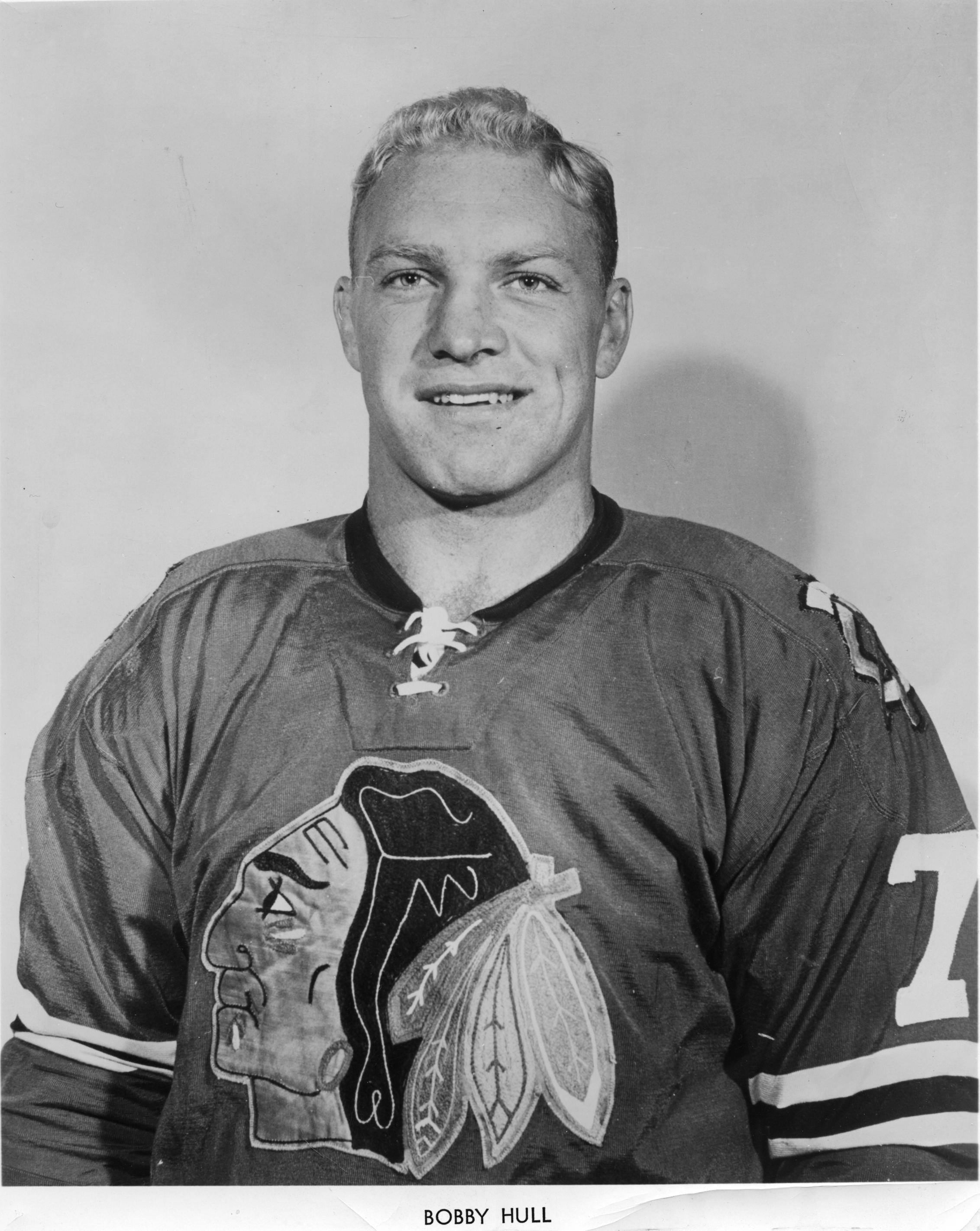
Hull with the Black Hawks in 1968

Hull had a solid debut year, finishing second in voting for the Calder Memorial Trophy. Hull originally wore numbers 16 and 7 as a Black Hawk but later switched to his famous number 9, a tribute to his childhood idol Gordie Howe. By his third season (1959–60), he led the league in goal- and point-scoring (the Art Ross Trophy), a double feat which he also achieved in 1961–62 and 1965–66. He led Chicago to the Stanley Cup in 1961—their third overall and first in 23 years. He finished second in point-scoring three further times.

On March 12, 1966, Hull became the first NHL player to score more than 50 goals in a season, surpassing Maurice Richard's, Bernie Geoffrion's, and his own mark of 50 goals. His 51st goal, scored on Cesare Maniago of the New York Rangers, earned him a seven-minute standing ovation from the Chicago Stadium faithful. Hull eventually scored 54 goals that season, the highest single-season total of the Original Six era. That same year, Hull set the record for the most points in a season with 97, one more than the previous record set by Dickie Moore seven years earlier. His point total was tied the next year by teammate Stan Mikita in the final season with six teams in NHL history; in the 1968–69 season, Phil Esposito broke the points record. Hull led the league in goal-scoring seven times during the 1960s. In the 1967–68 season, he joined the 400 goal club on January 7.

In the 1968–69 season, despite Hull breaking his own goals in a season record by four goals (netting 58) and setting a career NHL high of 107 points (second in the league that year), the Hawks missed the playoffs for the first time since his rookie season. By his final NHL season, he had scored 50 goals or more a remarkable five times. This was only one time less than all other players in NHL history combined up until that point in time.

In his first fifteen seasons, he was voted the First-Team All-Star left winger ten times and the Second-Team All-Star left winger twice. His slapshot was once clocked at 118.3 mph (190.5 km/h) and he could skate 29.7 mph (47.8 km/h). During his drive to be the first to eclipse the 50 goal mark, Hull's wrist shot was said to be harder than his slapshot.

==== "Bobby Hull Rule" ====
Hull and teammate Stan Mikita were two of the first players to curve the blades of their hockey sticks, with their greatly warped sticks widely referred to as "banana blades". The curved blade made the puck's trajectory unpredictable and was quickly adopted across the sport. Hull is the player typically linked most to a rule that curbed this practice because of the potential danger to goalies, few of whom wore masks in that era. The rule originally limited the blade curvature to between 0.5 in (13 mm) and 0.75 in (19 mm); in 1970, it was set at 0.5 in (13 mm). NHL Rule 10.1 currently limits the curvature to 0.75 in (19 mm).

=== WHA career ===
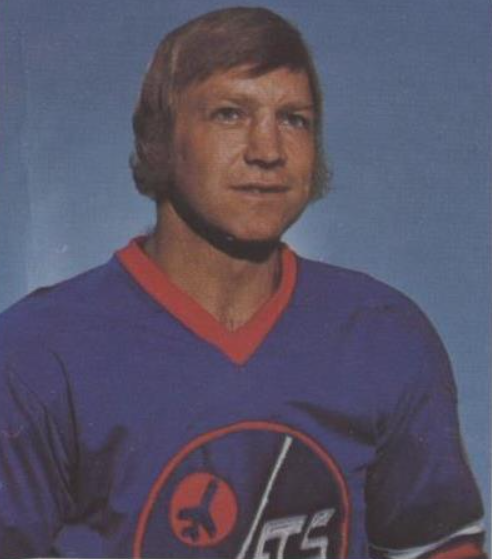
Hull with the Jets in 1975.

Long unhappy with his poor salary despite being one of hockey's preeminent superstars, Hull responded to overtures from the upstart World Hockey Association's Winnipeg Jets in 1972 by jesting that he would jump to them for a million dollars, a sum then considered absurd. Gathering the other league owners together to contribute to the unprecedented amount on the grounds that inking such a major star gave instant credibility to the new rival league that was competing directly against the entrenched NHL, Jets owner Ben Hatskin agreed to the sum, and signed Hull as a player-coach for a contract worth $1.75 million over 10 years plus a $1 million signing bonus, on June 27, 1972. Although his debut with Winnipeg was held up in litigation by the NHL, Hull instantly became the WHA's greatest star, winning the Gordie Howe Trophy as league MVP in that very first season despite being bugged by bone chips in his elbow that still saw him score 51 goals. He then won the MVP award again in the 1974–75 season. With Swedish linemates Anders Hedberg and Ulf Nilsson he formed one of the most formidable forward lines of the 1970s (known as "The Hot Line"), leading the Jets to two AVCO Cups during his time with the club. His best performance was during the 1974–75 season, when he scored 77 goals to set a new professional mark, while adding 65 assists for a total of 142 points, five behind the league leader, one of two times he finished second in the point-scoring race in the WHA; he set a then record for goals in a professional season at home in Winnipeg on April 6, 1975, in his 78th and last game played that season; he did so off Russ Gillow of the San Diego Mariners.

In October 1975, Hull sat out a game as a form of protest against hockey violence, stating, “Setting an example for kids should be hockey's main theme. Bodychecking and aggressiveness is part of hockey. So is the odd fight because of the tempo. But not the stuff that's going on. The intimidation. The stick‐swinging, flailing it like an ax. The high stick. The spear. That's not hockey. Intimidation isn't hockey.” In the five WHA seasons in which he played more than half the schedule, he was voted a First-Team All-Star thrice and a Second-Team All-Star twice, while tallying 50 goals and 100 points four times each. The Jets won the 1978 WHA playoffs with Hull delivering eight goals in the postseason run. In the game four victory over the New England Whalers, Hull scored in the third period to make it 4–2 in the eventual 5–3 victory that meant Hull delivered the series-clinching goal. As it turned out, this was his last postseason goal in his career. Hull scored 43 goals in the WHA playoffs, the most in WHA postseason history.

Because he joined the rival league, Hull was not allowed to represent Team Canada in the 1972 Summit Series, which pitted Canada's top NHL players against the USSR's national team. Two years later, a second Summit Series was held in which Hull and other top WHA stars (including Gordie Howe, who had been retired from the NHL at the time of the initial Summit Series) competed against the Soviet national team. The WHA lost the series four games to one (three ending in a tie), despite Hull's seven goals. He was a key member of the Canadian squad that won the 1976 Canada Cup, though, scoring five goals and three assists in seven games. On March 11, 1978 in Quebec, Hull scored his 1,000th combined goal (including regular season and playoffs of both the NHL and WHA) against the Quebec Nordiques, making him the second player with 1,000 goals in hockey history next to Gordie Howe. He initially announced his retirement in the fall of 1978.

=== Later career and retirements ===
Slowed by injuries and age, Hull played only a few games in the WHA's final season of 1978–79, retiring on November 2, 1978. However, after the 1979 merger of the two leagues (including the Jets) and reportedly in financial straits, Hull came out of retirement to play once more for the NHL Jets. He played in eighteen games before being traded to the Hartford Whalers for future considerations on February 27, 1980, bringing the two-time Gordie Howe Trophy winner together with the 51-year-old Howe himself (who, after Hull's initial contest with the Whalers, told the press, "The kid looks good in his first game."). Hull played effectively in nine games (two goals and five assists) as the Whalers reached the postseason. In the Preliminary Round against the Montreal Canadiens, Hull did not record a statistic as the Whalers were swept with an overtime loss at the Hartford Civic Center on April 11. As it turned out, this was Hull's last game as a professional player, as he retired soon after to care for his partner, who had been injured in an automobile accident.

In September 1981, Hull attempted one final comeback with the New York Rangers at age 42, at the suggestion of Rangers coach Herb Brooks, who wanted to try reuniting Hull with his former Jets teammates, Hedberg and Nilsson. The comeback attempt lasted five exhibition games, during which Hull had one goal and one assist, before he and the Rangers both decided it was best to end the comeback. It was the second time in Hull's career that he had played exhibition games with the Rangers; in 1959, after missing the playoffs the previous spring, the Rangers and the Boston Bruins had been sent on an exhibition tour of Europe, and then-emerging star Hull and Eddie Shack were added to the Rangers' roster for the tour. Hull and Shack co-led the Rangers in scoring, each netting 14 goals over the 23-game tour.

Hull ended his career having played in 1,063 NHL games, accumulating 610 goals, 560 assists, 1,170 points, 640 penalty minutes, three Art Ross Trophies, two Hart Memorial Trophies (he finished second or third in the voting an additional six times), a Lady Byng Memorial Trophy, and a Stanley Cup Championship, adding 62 goals and 67 assists for 129 points in 119 playoff games. He played in 411 WHA games, scoring 303 goals, 335 assists, and 638 points, adding 43 goals and 37 assists in 60 playoff games. His North American major league professional total of 1,018 goals (NHL and WHA including playoffs) is the third most of all-time after Wayne Gretzky (1,072) and Gordie Howe (1,071), although the NHL does not recognize scoring statistics from the WHA in players' career totals.

== Post-playing career ==
In 1978, he was made an Officer of the Order of Canada. Besides his Hall of Fame induction, Hull's no. 9 jersey has been retired by the Black Hawks, the Jets, and their successor team, the Arizona Coyotes. When Bobby's son Brett Hull joined the Coyotes, they unretired the number for Brett to wear during his brief stint there to honour his father. Evander Kane, who wore number 9 for the Atlanta Thrashers when they became the current Winnipeg Jets franchise, sought and received Hull's permission to wear the number.

In 2003, he was named the figurehead commissioner of a new World Hockey Association, intended to operate during the 2004–05 NHL lockout; it never entered play, and the organization subsequently ran several ephemeral low-minor league and unsanctioned Tier II junior leagues. Hull served as an ambassador for the Blackhawks through part of the 2021–22 season until the organization announced, "When it comes to Bobby, specifically, we jointly agreed earlier this season that he will retire from any official team role."

== Personal life and death ==
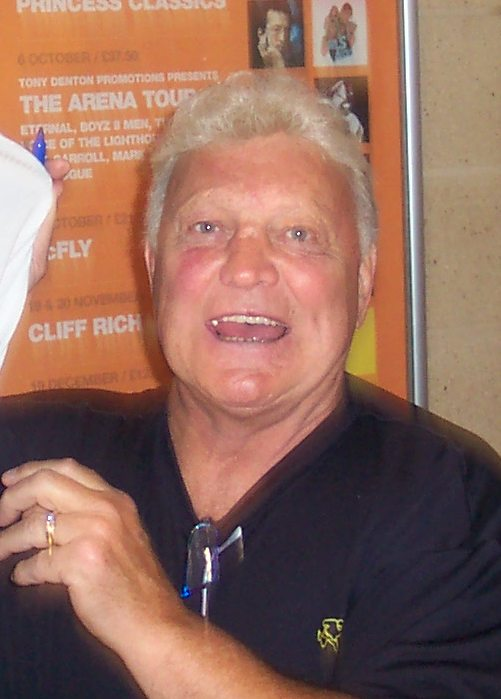
Hull in 2006

Hull's younger brother Dennis (nicknamed "the Silver Jet") starred alongside him with the Chicago Black Hawks for eight seasons, scoring over 300 goals in his own right. When Bobby was excluded from the 1972 Summit Series because he had signed to play in the WHA, Dennis initially planned to boycott the event as well as a show of support for his brother, but Bobby persuaded him to stay on Team Canada.

Hull's marriage to Joanne McKay ended in divorce in 1980 after several abusive incidents.

In 1986, he was arrested and charged with assault and battery after allegedly hitting his third wife, Deborah, after an argument. She eventually dropped the charges.

Hull was romantically involved with a woman named Claudia Allen. In 1980, Hull retired from the Hartford Whalers to take care of Allen, who was injured in a severe automobile accident. The couple never married.

In 1998, Hull allegedly made pro-Nazi comments to The Moscow Times. He was quoted as saying, "Hitler, for example, had some good ideas. He just went a little bit too far." Hull later denied having complimented Hitler and said journalists had raised the subject. The incident was parodied on the Canadian news satire show This Hour Has 22 Minutes, with Rick Mercer reading a spot saying Hull had been misquoted, and had actually said, "Sittler had some good ideas."

=== Children ===
Brett Hull (the "Golden Brett"), was also a hockey star, finishing his NHL career with 741 goals (currently the fifth-highest goal total in NHL history). Bobby and Brett are the only father-and-son tandem to achieve the marks of more than 50 goals in an NHL season and more than 600 NHL goals. They are also the only father-and-son duo to win the Hart Memorial Trophy (Bobby twice and Brett once) and Lady Byng Trophy, and to lead the league in goal scoring (Bobby seven times and Brett three times). While playing for the Phoenix Coyotes in 2005, Brett donned his father's retired No. 9 for the last five games of his career.

Bart Hull was a standout running back for the Boise State University' Broncos football team and played with the Ottawa Rough Riders and Saskatchewan Roughriders in the Canadian Football League (CFL) as well as one season of professional indoor football prior to recurring injuries. Post football, he briefly played professional hockey with the Idaho Steelheads.

Bobby Jr. and Blake both played junior and senior hockey. Bobby Jr. played hockey at the University of British Columbia but graduated from University of Manitoba before getting into the garment industry in 1985. Bobby Jr. won the Memorial Cup with the 1980 Cornwall Royals. Blake decided instead to attend Wilfrid Laurier University and pursued a golf career rather than college hockey. He played for the Allan Cup-winning Brantford Mott's Clamatos of the OHA Senior A Hockey League (AAA Men's Amateur) in 1985.

Hull's daughter, Michelle, became a lawyer. She works with battered women as a result of witnessing her father's treatment of her mother, Joanne McKay.

=== Bobby Hull Community Rink ===
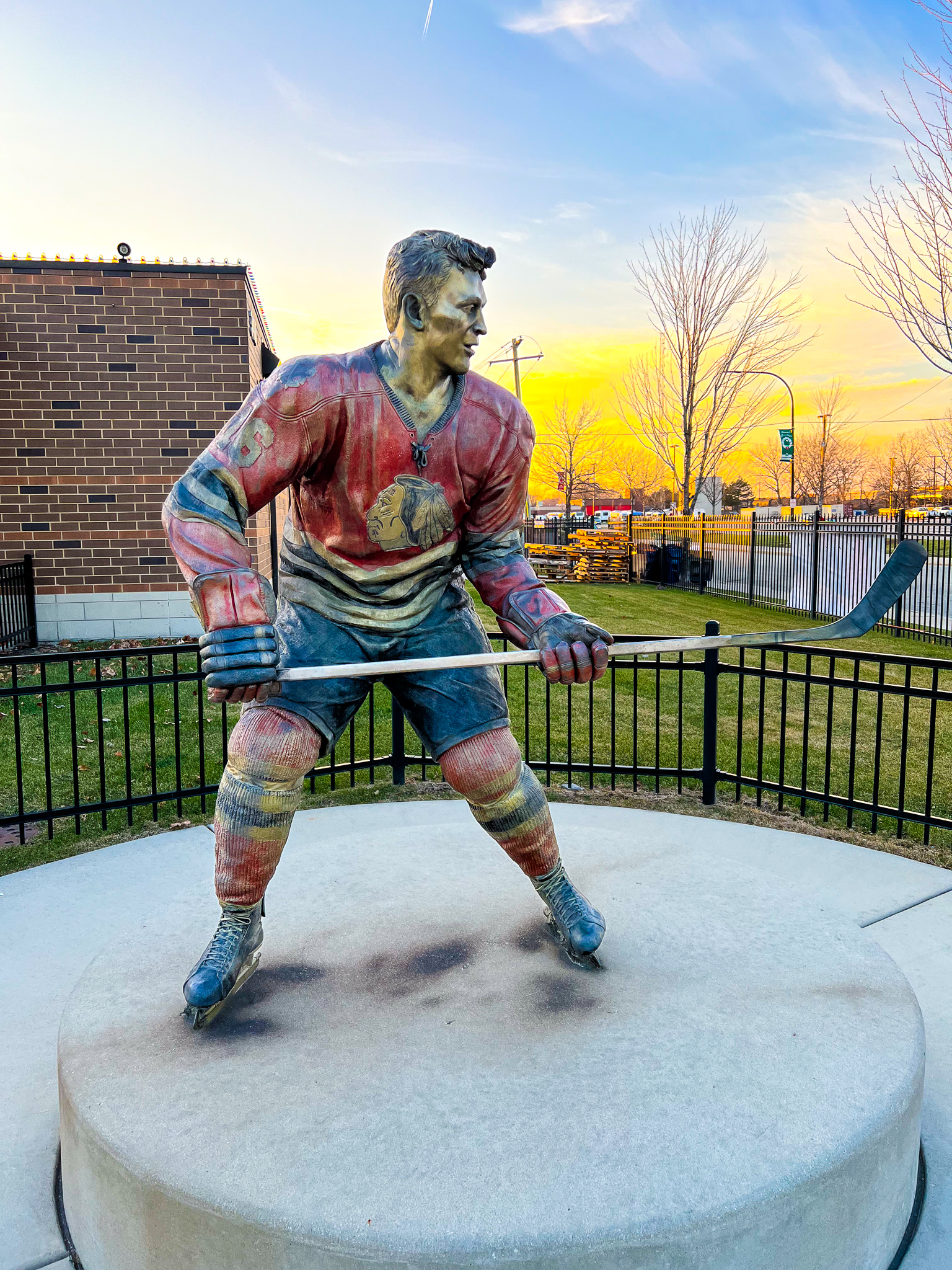
Statue of Hull at the Bobby Hull Ice Rink (Cicero, Illinois)

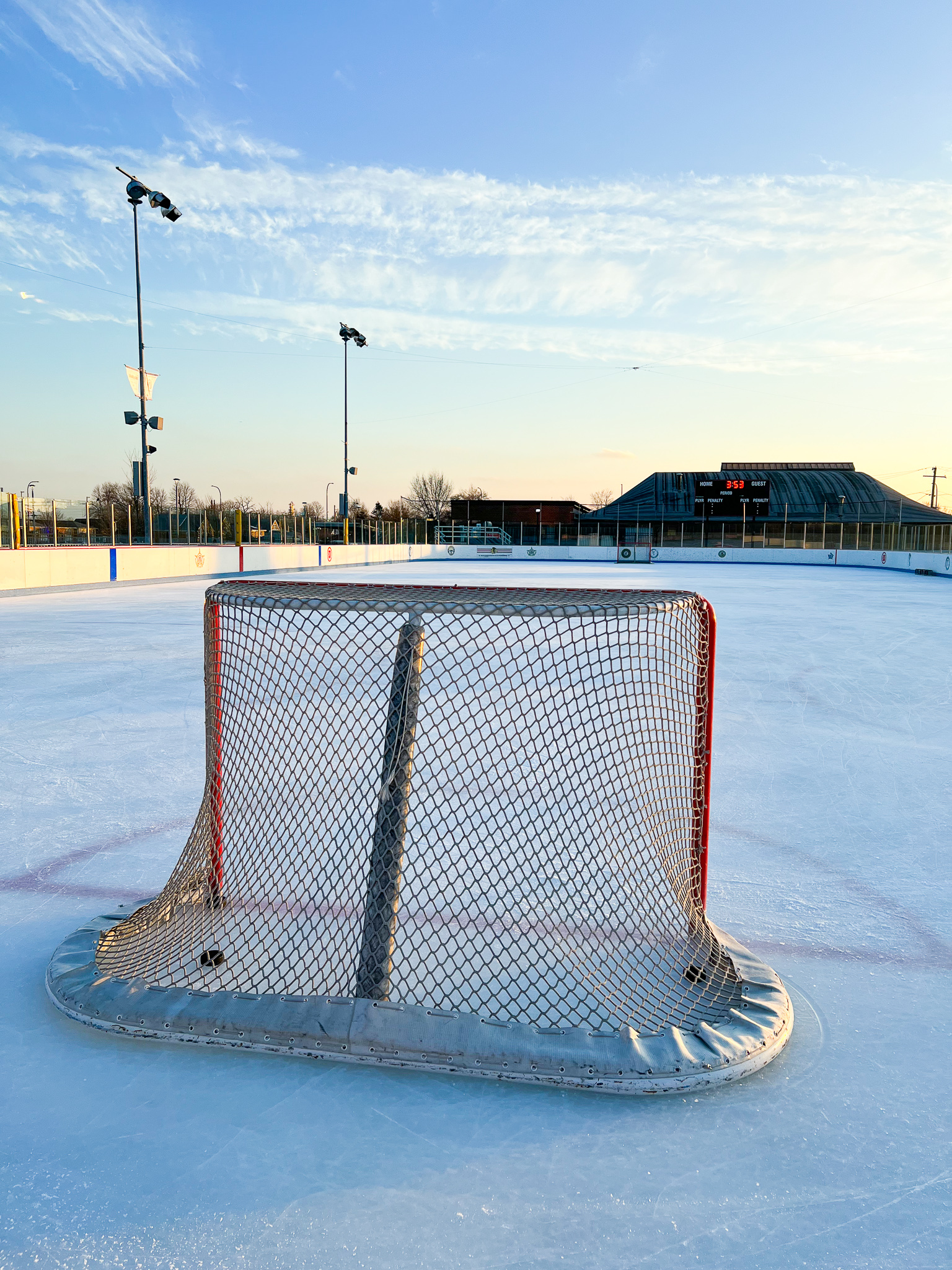
Bobby Hull Ice Rink (Cicero, Illinois)

The Town of Cicero, Illinois created a public outdoor rink in his name. The rink hosts skating lessons, public skate, public Stick & Puck, High School Hockey games, and more.

=== Death ===
On January 30, 2023, Hull died at his home in Wheaton, Illinois, at the age of 84. His son Brett released a statement following his father's death via the Twitter account of the St. Louis Blues.

In February 2025, Hull's family released a statement saying that researchers had determined that Hull had stage 2 chronic traumatic encephalopathy (CTE) at the time of his death.

== Awards and achievements ==
- Art Ross Trophy winner (1960, 1962, and 1966)
- NHL First All-Star Team left wing (1960, 1962, 1964, 1965, 1966, 1967, 1968, 1969, 1970, and 1972)
- Stanley Cup champion (1961)
- NHL Second All-Star Team left wing (1963 and 1971)
- Hart Memorial Trophy winner (1965 and 1966)
- Lady Byng Memorial Trophy winner (1965)
- Lester Patrick Trophy winner (1969)
- 7x NHL goalscoring leader (1960, 1962, 1964, 1966, 1967, 1968, 1969).
- Became third hockey player to appear on the cover of Time magazine
- NHL All-Star game MVP (1970, 1971), only player to win consecutive All-Star game MVP awards
- WHA First All-Star Team (1973, 1974, and 1975)
- WHA Second All-Star Team (1976 and 1978)
- WHA Most Valuable Player (1973 and 1975)
- Avco Cup (WHA) champion (1976, 1978, and 1979)
- Inducted into the Hockey Hall of Fame in 1983
- When he moved to the WHA, he was the second leading goal-scorer and ninth leading point-scorer in NHL history.
- Second in WHA history in goals, sixth in assists and third in points
- In 1998, he was ranked number 8 on The Hockey News' list of the 100 Greatest Hockey Players, the highest-ranking left winger
- Honoured member of the Manitoba Hockey Hall of Fame
- Member of the Manitoba Sports Hall of Fame
- Inaugural member of the World Hockey Association Hall of Fame.
- Honoured member of the Ontario Sports Hall of Fame
- In 2011, statues of Hull and Stan Mikita were installed outside the United Center, where the Blackhawks currently play

== Career statistics ==
=== Regular season and playoffs ===
			Regular season					Playoffs
Season	Team	League	GP	G	A	Pts	PIM	GP	G	A	Pts	PIM
1954–55	St. Catharines Teepees	OHA	6	0	0	0	0	—	—	—	—	—
1955–56	St. Catharines Teepees	OHA	48	11	7	18	79	6	0	2	2	9
1956–57	St. Catharines Teepees	OHA	52	33	28	61	95	13	8	8	16	24
1957–58	Chicago Black Hawks	NHL	70	13	34	47	62	—	—	—	—	—
1958–59	Chicago Black Hawks	NHL	70	18	32	50	50	6	1	1	2	2
1959–60	Chicago Black Hawks	NHL	70	39	42	81	68	3	1	0	1	2
1960–61	Chicago Black Hawks	NHL	67	31	25	56	43	12	4	10	14	4
1961–62	Chicago Black Hawks	NHL	70	50	34	84	35	12	8	6	14	12
1962–63	Chicago Black Hawks	NHL	65	31	31	62	27	5	8	2	10	4
1963–64	Chicago Black Hawks	NHL	70	43	44	87	50	7	2	5	7	2
1964–65	Chicago Black Hawks	NHL	61	39	32	71	32	14	10	7	17	27
1965–66	Chicago Black Hawks	NHL	65	54	43	97	70	6	2	2	4	10
1966–67	Chicago Black Hawks	NHL	66	52	28	80	52	6	4	2	6	0
1967–68	Chicago Black Hawks	NHL	71	44	31	75	39	11	4	6	10	15
1968–69	Chicago Black Hawks	NHL	74	58	49	107	48	—	—	—	—	—
1969–70	Chicago Black Hawks	NHL	61	38	29	67	8	8	3	8	11	2
1970–71	Chicago Black Hawks	NHL	78	44	52	96	32	18	11	14	25	16
1971–72	Chicago Black Hawks	NHL	78	50	43	93	24	8	4	4	8	6
1972–73	Winnipeg Jets	WHA	63	51	52	103	37	14	9	16	25	16
1973–74	Winnipeg Jets	WHA	75	53	42	95	38	4	1	1	2	4
1974–75	Winnipeg Jets	WHA	78	77	65	142	41	—	—	—	—	—
1975–76	Winnipeg Jets	WHA	80	53	70	123	30	13	12	8	20	4
1976–77	Winnipeg Jets	WHA	34	21	32	53	14	20	13	9	22	2
1977–78	Winnipeg Jets	WHA	77	46	71	117	23	9	8	3	11	12
1978–79	Winnipeg Jets	WHA	4	2	3	5	0	—	—	—	—	—
1979–80	Winnipeg Jets	NHL	18	4	6	10	0	—	—	—	—	—
1979–80	Hartford Whalers	NHL	9	2	5	7	0	3	0	0	0	0
NHL totals			1,063	610	560	1,170	640	119	62	67	129	102
WHA totals			411	303	335	638	183	60	43	37	80	38

=== International ===
Year	Team	Event	GP	G	A	Pts	PIM
1974	Canada	SS	8	7	2	9	0
1976	Canada	CC	7	5	3	8	2
Senior totals			15	12	5	17	2

== Head coaching record ==
Team	Year	Regular season						Post season			
Team	Year	G	W	L	T	Pts	Finish	W	L	Pct.	Result
WPG	1972–73	78	43	31	4	90	2nd in Western	9	5	.643	Lost in Avco Cup Final (NEW)
WPG	1973–74	78	34	39	5	73	4th in Western	0	4	.000	Lost in Quarterfinals (HSA)
WPG	1974–75	13	4	9	0	8	Resigned	—	—	—	—
WHA totals		169	81	79	9			9	9	.500	2 playoff appearances

== See also ==
- List of members of the Hockey Hall of Fame
- List of NHL statistical leaders
- List of family relations in the NHL
- List of professional sports families
- List of NHL players with 1,000 points
- List of NHL players with 500 goals
- List of NHL players with 1,000 games played
- List of Canadian sports personalities

Awards and achievements
Preceded by Jean Béliveau	Winner of the Hart Memorial Trophy; 1965, 1966	Succeeded by Stan Mikita
Preceded by Dickie Moore; Bernie Geoffrion; Stan Mikita	Winner of the Art Ross Trophy; 1960; 1962; 1966	Succeeded by Bernie Geoffrion; Gordie Howe; Stan Mikita
Preceded by Jean Béliveau; Bernie Geoffrion; Gordie Howe; Norm Ullman	NHL goals leader 1960; 1962; 1964; 1966, 1967, 1968, 1969	Succeeded by Bernie Geoffrion; Gordie Howe; Norm Ullman; Phil Esposito
Preceded by Ken Wharram	Winner of the Lady Byng Memorial Trophy; 1965	Succeeded by Alex Delvecchio
Preceded by Position created Rudy Pilous	Head coach of the Winnipeg Jets; 1972–1974; 1975	Succeeded by Rudy Pilous; Bobby Kromm
Preceded by Position created	Commissioner of the WHA; 2003–2005	Succeeded by Position abolished
