= Tommy Ivan Trophy =

The Tommy Ivan Trophy was awarded annually to the player selected as the most valuable player in the Central Hockey League (CHL).

Named in honour of Tommy Ivan commencing with 1974–75 CHL season, this individual award recognized the player who distinguished himself for his “outstanding contributions to his team during the course of the regular season”. The winner was chosen through a vote of the CHL coaches.

== List of winners ==
Season	Winner	Team
1963–64	Jeannot Gilbert	Minneapolis Bruins
1964–65	Cesare Maniago	Minneapolis Bruins
1965–66	Art Stratton	St. Louis Braves
1966–67	Art Stratton	St. Louis Braves
1967–68	Bryan Watson	Houston Apollos
1968–69	Jim Lorentz	Oklahoma City Blazers
1969–70	Dan Johnson	Tulsa Oilers
1970–71	Andre Dupont	Omaha Knights
1970–71	Peter McDuffe	Omaha Knights
1970–71	Gerry Ouellette	Omaha Knights
1970–71	Joe Zanussi	Fort Worth Wings
1971–72	Gregg Sheppard	Oklahoma City Blazers
1972–73	Mike Cormier	Fort Worth Wings
1973–74	Glenn Resch	Fort Worth Wings
1974–75	Wayne Schaab	Omaha Knights
1975–76	Ian McKegney	Dallas Black Hawks
1976–77	Barclay Plager	Kansas City Blues
1977–78	Doug Palazzari	Salt Lake Golden Eagles
1978–79	Ron Low	Kansas City Blues
1979–80	Doug Palazzari	Salt Lake Golden Eagles
1980–81	Joe Mullen	Salt Lake Golden Eagles
1981–82	Bob Francis	Oklahoma City Stars
1982–83	Kelly Hrudey	Indianapolis Checkers
1983–84	Bruce Affleck	Indianapolis Checkers
1983–84	John Vanbiesbrouck	Tulsa Oilers
