= Phil Esposito Trophy =

The Phil Esposito Trophy was awarded annually by the Central Hockey League (CHL) to the league's leading scorer during the regular season.

Named in honour of Phil Esposito commencing with 1979–80 CHL season, the Hall of Famer played 43 games in the CHL during the 1963–64 season, to collect 26 goals 54 points with the St. Louis Braves, before moving into the National Hockey League with the Chicago Black Hawks.

== List of winners ==
Season	Winner	Team	Pts
1963–64	Alain Caron	St. Louis Braves	125
1964–65	Tom McCarthy	Tulsa Oilers	97
1965–66	Art Stratton	St. Louis Braves	94
1966–67	Art Stratton	St. Louis Braves	90
1967–68	Ron Ward	Tulsa Oilers	85
1968–69	Jim Lorentz	Oklahoma City Blazers	101
1969–70	Jack Egers	Omaha Knights	90
1970–71	Pierre Jarry	Omaha Knights	92
1971–72	Ross Perkins	Fort Worth Texans	97
1972–73	Lyle Moffat^{*Tie}	Tulsa Oilers	80 (40g, 40a, 71gp)
1972–73	Dan Gruen^{*Tie}	Fort Worth Texans	80 (35g, 45a, 68gp)
1973–74	Wayne Schaab	Omaha Knights	89
1974–75	Wayne Schaab	Omaha Knights	85
1975–76	Jim Wiley	Tulsa Oilers	96
1976–77	Steve West	Oklahoma City Blazers	96
1977–78	Doug Palazzari	Salt Lake Golden Eagles	82
1978–79	Rick Shinske	Salt Lake Golden Eagles	88
1979–80	Doug Palazzari	Salt Lake Golden Eagles	109
1980–81	Joe Mullen	Salt Lake Golden Eagles	117
1981–82	Bob Francis	Oklahoma City Stars	114
1982–83	Wes Jarvis	Birmingham South Stars	108
1983–84	Scott MacLeod	Salt Lake Golden Eagles	118
