= Ken Richardson (ice hockey) =

Canadian ice hockey player (born 1951)

- Born: April 12, 1951 (age 75) North Bay, Ontario, Canada
- Height: 5 ft 10 in (178 cm)
- Weight: 170 lb (77 kg; 12 st 2 lb)
- Position: Forward
- Shot: Left
- Played for: St. Louis Blues
- NHL draft: Undrafted
- Playing career: 1973–1980

Kenneth William Richardson (born April 12, 1951) is a Canadian former professional ice hockey player. He played 49 games in the National Hockey League with the St. Louis Blues from 1974 to 1978. The rest of his career, which lasted from 1973 to 1980, was spent in the minor leagues.

== Early life and education ==
Richardson was born in North Bay, Ontario. He is a graduate of Widdifield Secondary School. After retiring from the NHL in 1980, Richardson earned his Bachelor of Education from Nipissing University.

== Career ==
Richardson first signed with the Columbus Owls of the International Hockey League in 1973. Following his first season, the St. Louis Blues signed him as a free agent, where he played 49 games in the NHL until 1978. In 2005, Richardson was inducted into the North Bay Sports Hall of Fame.

== Career statistics ==
=== Regular season and playoffs ===
			Regular season					Playoffs
Season	Team	League	GP	G	A	Pts	PIM	GP	G	A	Pts	PIM
1968–69	Peterborough Petes	OHA	54	7	12	19	27	10	1	1	2	5
1969–70	Peterborough Petes	OHA	24	1	3	4	4	—	—	—	—	—
1970–71	Peterborough Petes	OHA	62	16	23	39	15	—	—	—	—	—
1971–72	Laurentian University	CIAU	26	16	10	26	21	—	—	—	—	—
1972–73	Laurentian University	CIAU	25	14	7	21	37	—	—	—	—	—
1973–74	Columbus Owls	IHL	58	11	22	33	29	4	5	2	7	10
1974–75	St. Louis Blues	NHL	21	5	7	12	12	—	—	—	—	—
1974–75	Denver Spurs	CHL	30	10	11	21	20	2	2	1	3	0
1975–76	Providence Reds	AHL	3	0	1	1	4	—	—	—	—	—
1975–76	Oklahoma City Blazers	CHL	70	19	33	52	17	4	1	0	1	0
1976–77	Kansas City Blues	CHL	74	20	27	47	17	10	2	3	5	2
1977–78	St. Louis Blues	NHL	12	2	5	7	2	—	—	—	—	—
1977–78	Salt Lake Golden Eagles	CHL	59	16	23	39	26	6	3	0	3	2
1978–79	St. Louis Blues	NHL	16	1	1	2	2	—	—	—	—	—
1978–79	Salt Lake Golden Eagles	CHL	58	7	10	17	15	10	3	1	4	0
1979–80	Salt Lake Golden Eagles	CHL	61	4	16	20	24	11	0	1	1	2
CHL totals			352	76	120	196	119	43	11	6	17	6
NHL totals			49	8	13	21	16	—	—	—	—	—
