= Lyle Moffat =

Canadian ice hockey player

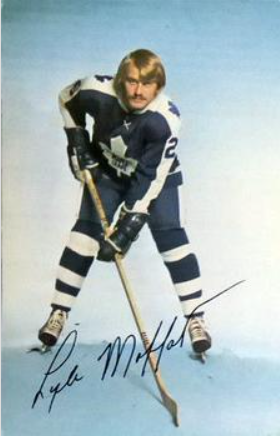
- Moffat in 1974 postcard for Toronto Maple Leafs
- Born: March 19, 1948 (age 78) Calgary, Alberta, Canada
- Height: 5 ft 10 in (178 cm)
- Weight: 180 lb (82 kg; 12 st 12 lb)
- Position: Left wing
- Shot: Left
- Played for: Toronto Maple Leafs; Cleveland Crusaders; Winnipeg Jets
- Playing career: 1971–1981

Lyle Gordon Moffat (born March 19, 1948) is a retired professional ice hockey player who played 96 games in the National Hockey League and 276 games in the World Hockey Association. He played for the Toronto Maple Leafs, Cleveland Crusaders, and Winnipeg Jets between 1973 and 1980.

== Career statistics ==
=== Regular season and playoffs ===
			Regular season					Playoffs
Season	Team	League	GP	G	A	Pts	PIM	GP	G	A	Pts	PIM
1966–67	Calgary Buffaloes	CMJHL	56	30	33	63	64	—	—	—	—	—
1967–68	Michigan Technological University	WCHA	—	—	—	—	—	—	—	—	—	—
1968–69	Michigan Technological University	WCHA	28	10	19	29	36	—	—	—	—	—
1969–70	Michigan Technological University	WCHA	29	12	11	23	44	—	—	—	—	—
1970–71	Michigan Technological University	WCHA	—	—	—	—	—	—	—	—	—	—
1971–72	Tulsa Oilers	CHL	70	15	16	31	82	13	2	4	6	25
1972–73	Toronto Maple Leafs	NHL	1	0	0	0	0	—	—	—	—	—
1972–73	Tulsa Oilers	CHL	71	40	40	80	108	—	—	—	—	—
1973–74	Oklahoma City Blazers	CHL	50	19	30	49	70	—	—	—	—	—
1974–75	Toronto Maple Leafs	NHL	22	2	7	9	13	—	—	—	—	—
1974–75	Oklahoma City Blazers	CHL	39	17	19	36	87	5	3	3	6	18
1975–76	Cleveland Crusaders	WHA	33	4	7	11	33	—	—	—	—	—
1975–76	Winnipeg Jets	WHA	42	13	9	22	44	13	3	3	6	9
1976–77	Winnipeg Jets	WHA	74	13	11	24	90	17	2	0	2	6
1977–78	Winnipeg Jets	WHA	57	9	16	25	39	9	5	7	12	9
1978–79	Winnipeg Jets	WHA	70	14	18	32	38	10	3	1	4	22
1979–80	Winnipeg Jets	NHL	74	10	9	19	38	—	—	—	—	—
1980–81	Tulsa Oilers	CHL	66	17	31	48	59	8	4	8	12	8
WHA totals			276	53	61	114	244	49	13	11	24	46
NHL totals			97	12	16	28	51	—	—	—	—	—

Preceded by Ross Perkins	CHL Leading Scorer tied with Dan Gruen; 1972–73	Succeeded by Wayne Schaab
