= Jim Wiley =

Canadian ice hockey player and coach (1950–2021)

- Born: April 28, 1950 Sault Ste. Marie, Ontario, Canada
- Died: December 26, 2021 (aged 71)
- Height: 6 ft 2 in (188 cm)
- Weight: 200 lb (91 kg; 14 st 4 lb)
- Position: Centre
- Shot: Left
- Played for: Pittsburgh Penguins; Vancouver Canucks
- Coached for: San Jose Sharks
- Playing career: 1972–1980
- Coaching career: 1984–2008

Thomas James Wiley (April 28, 1950 – December 26, 2021) was a Canadian professional ice hockey center and coach. He played 62 games in the National Hockey League (NHL) between 1972 and 1977, split between the Pittsburgh Penguins and Vancouver Canucks, with the bulk of his career being spent in the minor Central Hockey League. Wiley retired as a player in 1980, and in 1984 became a coach in the United States Hockey League, and later coached in several minor leagues. In 1995–96 Wiley coached the NHL's San Jose Sharks for the final 57 games of the season, before returning to the minors. His last season as a coach was in 2008.

== Playing career ==
Born in Sault Ste. Marie, Ontario, Wiley signed as a free agent with the Pittsburgh Penguins in 1972 following a fine collegiate career at Lake Superior State University, becoming the first Lakers alum to play in the NHL. He spent the majority of the next two seasons with the Hershey Bears, Pittsburgh's American Hockey League (AHL) affiliate, although he did appear in 26 games for the Penguins over that stretch, recording four assists.

Wiley was selected by the Vancouver Canucks in the 1974 NHL Intra-League Draft, but continued to find himself toiling in minor pro. He earned a two-game callup in 1975–76, and had his longest NHL stint in 1976–77, when he recorded four goals and ten points in 34 games for the Canucks. He retired in 1980 without seeing any further NHL action.

Wiley appeared in 62 NHL games, recording four goals and ten assists for 14 points along with eight penalty minutes.

== Coaching career ==
Following his retirement, Wiley moved into coaching. He was the long-time coach of the Des Moines Buccaneers of the United States Hockey League before breaking into the pro ranks in 1993 as head coach of the Kansas City Blades, the top affiliate of the San Jose Sharks.

When the Sharks fired head coach Kevin Constantine after a dismal 3–18–4 start, Wiley was promoted to the head coaching position with the NHL club. While his 17–37–3 record was somewhat of an improvement over their start, it was not enough for Wiley to keep his job. Following the season, he was reassigned back to the Sharks' top farm team, then the Kentucky Thoroughblades, where he served until 1998.

After leaving the Sharks organization, Wiley made stops in the East Coast Hockey League, Central Hockey League, and United Hockey League.

== Personal life and death ==
Wiley died on December 26, 2021, at the age of 71.

== Career statistics ==
=== Regular season and playoffs ===
			Regular season					Playoffs
Season	Team	League	GP	G	A	Pts	PIM	GP	G	A	Pts	PIM
1966–67	Sault Ste. Marie Greyhounds	NOJHL	25	13	22	35	13	12	11	7	18	4
1967–68	Sault Ste. Marie Greyhounds	NOJHL	38	21	31	52	34	11	2	3	5	6
1968–69	Lake Superior State University	ICHA	26	9	15	24	4	—	—	—	—	—
1969–70	Lake Superior State University	ICHA	25	21	17	38	11	—	—	—	—	—
1970–71	Lake Superior State University	ICHA	25	18	19	37	13	—	—	—	—	—
1971–72	Lake Superior State University	ICHA	28	22	34	56	24	—	—	—	—	—
1972–73	Hershey Bears	AHL	71	30	45	75	30	7	1	1	2	5
1972–73	Pittsburgh Penguins	NHL	4	0	1	1	0	—	—	—	—	—
1973–74	Hershey Bears	AHL	47	21	33	54	26	14	5	11	16	15
1973–74	Pittsburgh Penguins	NHL	22	0	3	3	2	—	—	—	—	—
1974–75	Seattle Totems	CHL	51	10	25	35	24	—	—	—	—	—
1975–76	Tulsa Oilers	CHL	76	33	63	96	21	9	5	4	9	38
1975–76	Vancouver Canucks	NHL	2	0	0	0	0	—	—	—	—	—
1976–77	Tulsa Oilers	CHL	29	17	17	34	27	9	4	4	8	4
1976–77	Vancouver Canucks	NHL	34	4	6	10	4	—	—	—	—	—
1978–79	Tulsa Oilers	CHL	73	23	45	68	29	—	—	—	—	—
1979–80	Tulsa Oilers	CHL	76	18	36	54	30	3	0	2	2	0
CHL totals			305	101	186	287	131	21	9	10	19	42
NHL totals			62	4	10	14	8	—	—	—	—	—

=== Coaching ===
==== NHL ====
Team	Year	Regular season						Postseason
Team	Year	G	W	L	T	Pts	Finish	Result
SJ	1995-96	57	17	37	3	(47)	7th in Pacific	Missed Playoffs

==== Other leagues ====
Team	Season	W	L	OTL/T
Kansas City Blades	1993–94	40	31	10
Kansas City Blades	1994–95	35	40	6
Kansas City Blades	1995–96	2	1	0
Kentucky Thoroughblades	1996–97	36	35	9
Kentucky Thoroughblades	1997–98	29	39	12
Lexington Men O' War	2002–03	34	31	7
Memphis RiverKings	2003–04	17	14	0
Roanoke Valley Vipers	2005–06	12	26	5
Amarillo Gorillas	2006–07	32	28	4
Amarillo Gorillas	2007–08	22	32	10

Sporting positions
Preceded by Wayne Schaab	CHL Leading Scorer; 1975–76	Succeeded by Steve West
Preceded by Kevin Constantine	Head coach of the San Jose Sharks; 1995–96	Succeeded by Al Sims
