= 1981–82 CHL season =

- League: Central Hockey League
- Sport: Ice hockey

Regular season
- Regular Season Top Team: Salt Lake Golden Eagles
- Top scorer: Bob Francis

Adams Cup playoffs

Adams Cup
- Champions: Indianapolis Checkers
- Runners-up: Dallas Black Hawks

CHL seasons
- 1980–81 1982–83

The 1981–82 CHL season was the 19th season of the Central Hockey League, a North American minor professional league. Nine teams participated in the regular season, and the Indianapolis Checkers won the league title over the Dallas Black Hawks. Coincidentally, the Checkers parent club the New York Islanders won their third consecutive Stanley Cup sweeping the Vancouver Canucks, who ironically just so happened to be the NHL affiliate of the Black Hawks.

== Regular season ==
North Division	GP	W	L	OTL	GF	GA	Pts
Salt Lake Golden Eagles (STL)	80	47	30	3	368	329	97
Cincinnati Tigers (TOR)	80	46	30	4	375	340	96
Indianapolis Checkers (NYI)	80	42	33	5	319	259	89
Nashville South Stars (MIN)	80	41	35	4	313	319	86

South Division	GP	W	L	OTL	GF	GA	Pts
Wichita Wind (EDM)	80	44	33	3	343	289	91
Tulsa Oilers (WPG)	80	43	36	1	355	324	87
Dallas Black Hawks (VAN)	80	37	37	6	394	382	80
Oklahoma City Stars (CGY)	80	25	54	1	300	397	51
Fort Worth Texans (COL)	80	20	57	3	273	401	43

== Playoffs ==
Division Semifinal
S1	Wichita Wind	3
N4	Nashville South Stars	0
S2	Tulsa Oilers	0
N3	Indianapolis Checkers	3
N1	Salt Lake Golden Eagles	3
S4	Oklahoma City Stars	1
N2	Cincinnati Tigers	1
S3	Dallas Black Hawks	3

Division Final
S1	Wichita Wind	0
N3	Indianapolis Checkers	4
N1	Salt Lake Golden Eagles	2
S3	Dallas Black Hawks	4

Adams Cup Final
N3	Indianapolis Checkers	4
S3	Dallas Black Hawks	2

== Awards ==
Award Name	Accomplishment	Player	Team
Bobby Orr Trophy	Best Defenseman	Dan Poulin	Nashville South Stars
Terry Sawchuk Trophy	Best Goaltender (statistical)	Kelly Hrudey	Indianapolis Checkers
Terry Sawchuk Trophy	Best Goaltender (statistical)	Robert Holland	Indianapolis Checkers
Jake Milford Trophy	Coach of the Year	Fred Creighton	Indianapolis Checkers
Phil Esposito Trophy	Leading Scorer	Bob Francis	Oklahoma City Stars
Bob Gassoff Trophy	Most Improved Defenseman	Dan Poulin	Nashville South Stars
Don Ashby Memorial Trophy	Unsung Hero	Reg Thomas	Cincinnati Tigers
Tommy Ivan Trophy	Most Valuable Player	Bob Francis	Oklahoma City Stars
Max McNab Trophy	Playoff MVP	Kelly Hrudey	Indianapolis Checkers
Ken McKenzie Trophy	Rookie of the Year	Bob Francis	Oklahoma City Stars
