= Danny Gruen =

Canadian ice hockey player (born 1952)

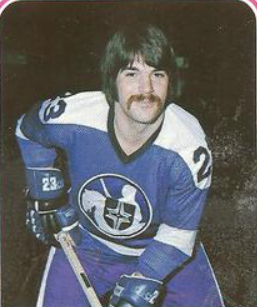
- Gruen in 1975 card
- Born: June 26, 1952 (age 73) Thunder Bay, Ontario, Canada
- Height: 5 ft 10 in (178 cm)
- Weight: 190 lb (86 kg; 13 st 8 lb)
- Position: Left wing
- Shot: Left
- Played for: Detroit Red Wings; Michigan Stags/Baltimore Blades; Cleveland Crusaders; Colorado Rockies; Minnesota Fighting Saints; Calgary Cowboys
- NHL draft: 58th overall, 1972; Detroit Red Wings
- Playing career: 1972–1983

Daniel Patrick Gruen (born June 26, 1952) is a retired professional ice hockey player who played 49 games in the National Hockey League and 181 games in the World Hockey Association. He played with the Colorado Rockies, Detroit Red Wings, Michigan Stags, Winnipeg Jets, Cleveland Crusaders, Calgary Cowboys, and Minnesota Fighting Saints.

== Career statistics ==
=== Regular season and playoffs ===
			Regular season					Playoffs
Season	Team	League	GP	G	A	Pts	PIM	GP	G	A	Pts	PIM
1968–69	Fort William Canadiens	TBJHL	24	7	5	12	30	—	—	—	—	—
1969–70	Fort William Canadiens	TBJHL	23	11	16	27	66	—	—	—	—	—
1970–71	Thunder Bay Vulcans	TBJHL	—	—	—	—	—	—	—	—	—	—
1971–72	Thunder Bay Vulcans	MNTBHL	36	30	60	90	—	—	—	—	—	—
1972–73	Detroit Red Wings	NHL	2	0	0	0	0	—	—	—	—	—
1972–73	Virginia Wings	AHL	3	1	1	2	0	—	—	—	—	—
1972–73	Fort Worth Wings	CHL	68	35	45	80	194	4	4	1	5	9
1973–74	Detroit Red Wings	NHL	18	1	3	4	7	—	—	—	—	—
1973–74	Virginia Wings	AHL	57	25	27	52	64	—	—	—	—	—
1974–75	Michigan Stags/Baltimore Blades	WHA	34	10	16	26	73	—	—	—	—	—
1974–75	Winnipeg Jets	WHA	32	9	12	21	21	—	—	—	—	—
1975–76	Cleveland Crusaders	WHA	80	26	24	50	72	3	2	0	2	0
1976–77	Colorado Rockies	NHL	29	8	10	18	12	—	—	—	—	—
1976–77	Minnesota Fighting Saints	WHA	34	10	9	19	19	—	—	—	—	—
1976–77	Calgary Cowboys	WHA	1	1	0	1	0	—	—	—	—	—
1977–78	Kansas City Red Wings	CHL	30	15	20	35	40	—	—	—	—	—
1978–79	Kansas City Red Wings	CHL	65	19	27	46	82	4	0	3	3	0
1979–80	Dayton Gems	IHL	7	0	3	3	22	—	—	—	—	—
1979–80	Muskegon Mohawks	IHL	24	4	22	26	16	—	—	—	—	—
1979–80	Hampton Aces	EHL	32	12	9	21	20	—	—	—	—	—
1982–83	Thunder Bay Twins	CASH	36	17	48	65	—	—	—	—	—	—
WHA totals			181	56	61	117	185	3	2	0	2	0
NHL totals			49	9	13	22	19	—	—	—	—	—

Preceded by Ross Perkins	CHL Leading Scorer tied with Lyle Moffat; 1972–73	Succeeded by Wayne Schaab
