= Bryan Watson (ice hockey) =

Canadian ice hockey player (1942–2021)

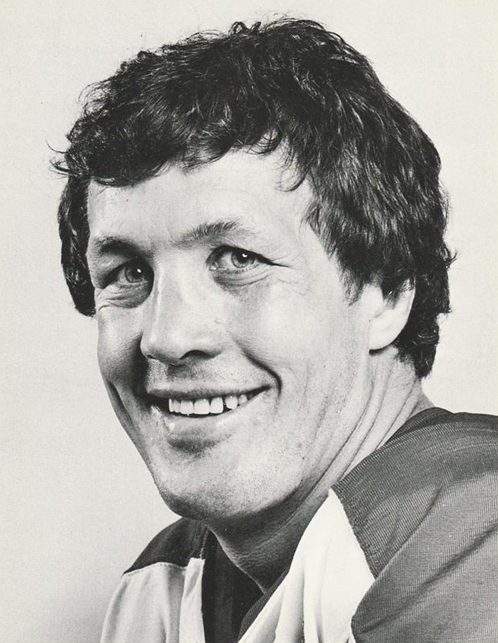
- Born: November 14, 1942 Bancroft, Ontario, Canada
- Died: July 8, 2021 (aged 78) Saint Michaels, Maryland, U.S.
- Height: 5 ft 9 in (175 cm)
- Weight: 170 lb (77 kg; 12 st 2 lb)
- Position: Defence
- Shot: Right
- Played for: Montreal Canadiens; Detroit Red Wings; Oakland Seals; Pittsburgh Penguins; St. Louis Blues; Washington Capitals; Cincinnati Stingers
- Coached for: Edmonton Oilers
- Playing career: 1963–1979
- Coaching career: 1980–1981

Bryan Joseph Watson (November 14, 1942 – July 8, 2021) was a Canadian professional ice hockey defenceman who played 16 seasons in the National Hockey League (NHL). He played for the Montreal Canadiens, Detroit Red Wings, Oakland Seals, Pittsburgh Penguins, St. Louis Blues, and Washington Capitals from 1963 to 1979, and briefly in the World Hockey Association with the Cincinnati Stingers. He later served as head coach of the Edmonton Oilers during the 1980–81 NHL season.

== Early life ==
Watson was born in Bancroft, Ontario, on November 14, 1942. His father was employed by the county; his mother was a housewife. To expand his sporting opportunities, Watson moved to Peterborough, Ontario, when he was 13 to live with his grandparents. There, he played junior hockey with the Peterborough Petes of the Ontario Hockey Association from 1960 to 1963, under the tutelage of head coach Scotty Bowman.

== Playing career ==
=== Montreal Canadiens (1963–65) ===
Watson signed with the Montreal Canadiens and made his NHL debut during the 1963–64 NHL season. He played in 39 games in the regular season and six games in the opening round of the Stanley Cup playoffs against the Toronto Maple Leafs. In Watson's second year, he appeared in only five games with Montreal and spent the bulk of the season with the AHL's Quebec Aces, where he played with Doug Harvey. Watson was traded to the Chicago Blackhawks for Don Johns on June 8, 1965. He was then claimed the next day by the Detroit Red Wings in the NHL Intra-League Draft.

=== Detroit Red Wings (1965–67) ===
During his first year with the Red Wings in 1965–66, Watson played all 70 games in the regular season, during which he scored his first NHL goal and led the team in penalty minutes. He also appeared in all twelve playoff games for Detroit, scoring two goals – the only playoff goals he scored in his whole career – and helping the Red Wings advance to the Stanley Cup Final against his former team the Canadiens. In 1966–67 Watson split his time between the Red Wings and the Memphis Wings, Detroit's farm team in the CPHL.

=== Montreal Canadiens (1967–68) ===
Watson was left unprotected by the Red Wings in the 1967 NHL Expansion Draft. The Minnesota North Stars consequently selected him as their fifteenth pick. That same day the North Stars traded Watson to Montreal for three young prospects, Bill Plager, Leo Thiffault and Barrie Meissner. Watson appeared in only a dozen games with the Canadiens in the 1967–68 season, registering just one assist and nine penalty minutes. He played the rest of the season in the minors, first for the Cleveland Barons in the AHL (12 games) and then the majority of the season with the Houston Apollos in the CPHL.

=== Oakland Seals and the Pittsburgh Penguins (1968–74) ===
Watson was traded to the Oakland Seals on June 28, 1968, in exchange for Tom Thurlby and a first-round draft pick in 1972. After playing fifty games for the Seals in the 1968–69 season Watson was sent to the Pittsburgh Penguins in a trade involving six players. Watson spent most of the next six seasons with the Penguins. He had the best offensive season of his career in 1971–72 when he scored three goals and twenty points. He also led the Penguins in penalty minutes in three of his four full seasons with the club and led the NHL in that statistic with 215 in 1971–72.

=== Detroit Red Wings (1974–76) ===
Watson started the 1973–74 season with the Penguins, before being traded to the St. Louis Blues on January 17, 1974. He played just 11 games with the team before returning to Detroit in a six-player trade less than a month later on February 14. He accumulated a career-high of 322 penalty minutes in 1975–76, second only to Steve Durbano with 370. He was also suspended for 10 games that season after fighting with Keith Magnuson of the Chicago Blackhawks on October 30, 1976.

=== Washington Capitals (1976–79) ===
Watson was traded to the Washington Capitals for Greg Joly several weeks into the 1976–77 regular season. In three seasons with the Capitals, he played 155 games and served 294 minutes in penalties. Watson received the Charlie Conacher Humanitarian Award in 1978 for his contributions to the Special Olympics. He sustained a serious cut to his right arm from a chainsaw in July 1978, while assisting his neighbour in chopping down a tree. However, he avoided long-term injury due to the uncommon nerve structure in his arm. During the 1978–79 regular season, he left the NHL to join the Cincinnati Stingers of the World Hockey Association, with whom he ended his playing career.

== Coaching career ==
Watson was appointed head coach of the Edmonton Oilers in 1980, at the start of the franchise's second season in the NHL, replacing Glen Sather who was promoted to president and general manager. However, when the team posted a record of four wins, nine losses, and five ties to start the season, Watson was demoted to an assistant by Sather, who resumed head coaching duties. Watson left the team after the season and never returned to coaching.

== Personal life and death ==
Watson was married to Lindy Wilson for 53 years until his death. Together, they had two children: Stephen and Lisa. Watson and Lindy opened Armand's pizza outlet in the Old Town section of Alexandria, Virginia, a suburb of Washington, D.C., in 1983. Fifteen years later, the business's name was changed to Bugsy's, his nickname during his playing years. Watson sold his interest in the business in 2013.

During the 1980s, Watson kept on playing hockey in an over-40 league in Mount Vernon.

Watson died on July 8, 2021, at his home in St. Michaels, Maryland. He was 78, and suffered from pneumonia before his death.

== Career statistics ==
Bold indicates led league

			Regular season					Playoffs
Season	Team	League	GP	G	A	Pts	PIM	GP	G	A	Pts	PIM
1960–61	Peterborough Petes	OHA-Jr.	18	0	1	1	4	—	—	—	—	—
1961–62	Peterborough Petes	OHA-Jr.	50	3	16	19	129	—	—	—	—	—
1962–63	Peterborough Petes	OHA-Jr.	49	9	22	31	80	6	0	3	3	10
1962–63	Hull-Ottawa Canadiens	EPHL	—	—	—	—	—	3	1	1	2	0
1963–64	Montreal Canadiens	NHL	39	0	2	2	18	6	0	0	0	2
1963–64	Omaha Knights	CPHL	9	1	1	2	12	—	—	—	—	—
1964–65	Montreal Canadiens	NHL	5	0	1	1	7	—	—	—	—	—
1964–65	Quebec Aces	AHL	64	1	16	17	186	5	0	0	0	35
1965–66	Detroit Red Wings	NHL	70	2	7	9	133	**12**	2	0	2	30
1966–67	Detroit Red Wings	NHL	48	0	1	1	66	—	—	—	—	—
1966–67	Memphis Wings	CPHL	16	1	3	4	76	—	—	—	—	—
1967–68	Montreal Canadiens	NHL	12	0	1	1	9	—	—	—	—	—
1967–68	Cleveland Barons	AHL	12	2	4	6	22	—	—	—	—	—
1967–68	Houston Apollos	CPHL	50	2	37	39	293	—	—	—	—	—
1968–69	Oakland Seals	NHL	50	2	3	5	97	—	—	—	—	—
1968–69	Pittsburgh Penguins	NHL	18	0	4	4	35	—	—	—	—	—
1969–70	Pittsburgh Penguins	NHL	61	1	9	10	189	10	0	0	0	17
1969–70	Baltimore Clippers	AHL	5	1	2	3	8	—	—	—	—	—
1970–71	Pittsburgh Penguins	NHL	43	2	6	8	119	—	—	—	—	—
1971–72	Pittsburgh Penguins	NHL	75	3	17	20	**212**	4	0	0	0	21
1972–73	Pittsburgh Penguins	NHL	69	1	17	18	179	—	—	—	—	—
1973–74	Pittsburgh Penguins	NHL	38	1	4	5	137	—	—	—	—	—
1973–74	St. Louis Blues	NHL	11	0	1	1	19	—	—	—	—	—
1973–74	Detroit Red Wings	NHL	21	0	4	4	99	—	—	—	—	—
1974–75	Detroit Red Wings	NHL	70	1	13	14	238	—	—	—	—	—
1975–76	Detroit Red Wings	NHL	79	0	18	18	322	—	—	—	—	—
1976–77	Detroit Red Wings	NHL	14	0	1	1	39	—	—	—	—	—
1976–77	Washington Capitals	NHL	56	1	14	15	91	—	—	—	—	—
1977–78	Washington Capitals	NHL	79	3	11	14	167	—	—	—	—	—
1978–79	Washington Capitals	NHL	20	0	1	1	36	—	—	—	—	—
1978–79	Cincinnati Stingers	WHA	21	0	2	2	56	3	0	1	1	2
NHL totals			878	17	135	152	2,212	32	2	0	2	70
WHA totals			21	0	2	2	56	3	0	1	1	2

== Coaching record ==
Team	Year	Regular season						Post season
Team	Year	G	W	L	T	Pts	Finish	Result
EDM	1980-81	18	4	9	5	(13)	4th in Smythe	

== See also ==
- List of NHL players with 2000 career penalty minutes

Preceded by Art Stratton	CPHL Leading Scorer; 1967–68	Succeeded by Jim Lorentz
Preceded by Art Stratton	CPHL Most Valuable Player Award; 1967–68	Succeeded by Jim Lorentz
Preceded by Glen Sather	Head coach of the Edmonton Oilers; 1980	Succeeded by Glen Sather
