= Ian McKegney =

Canadian ice hockey player

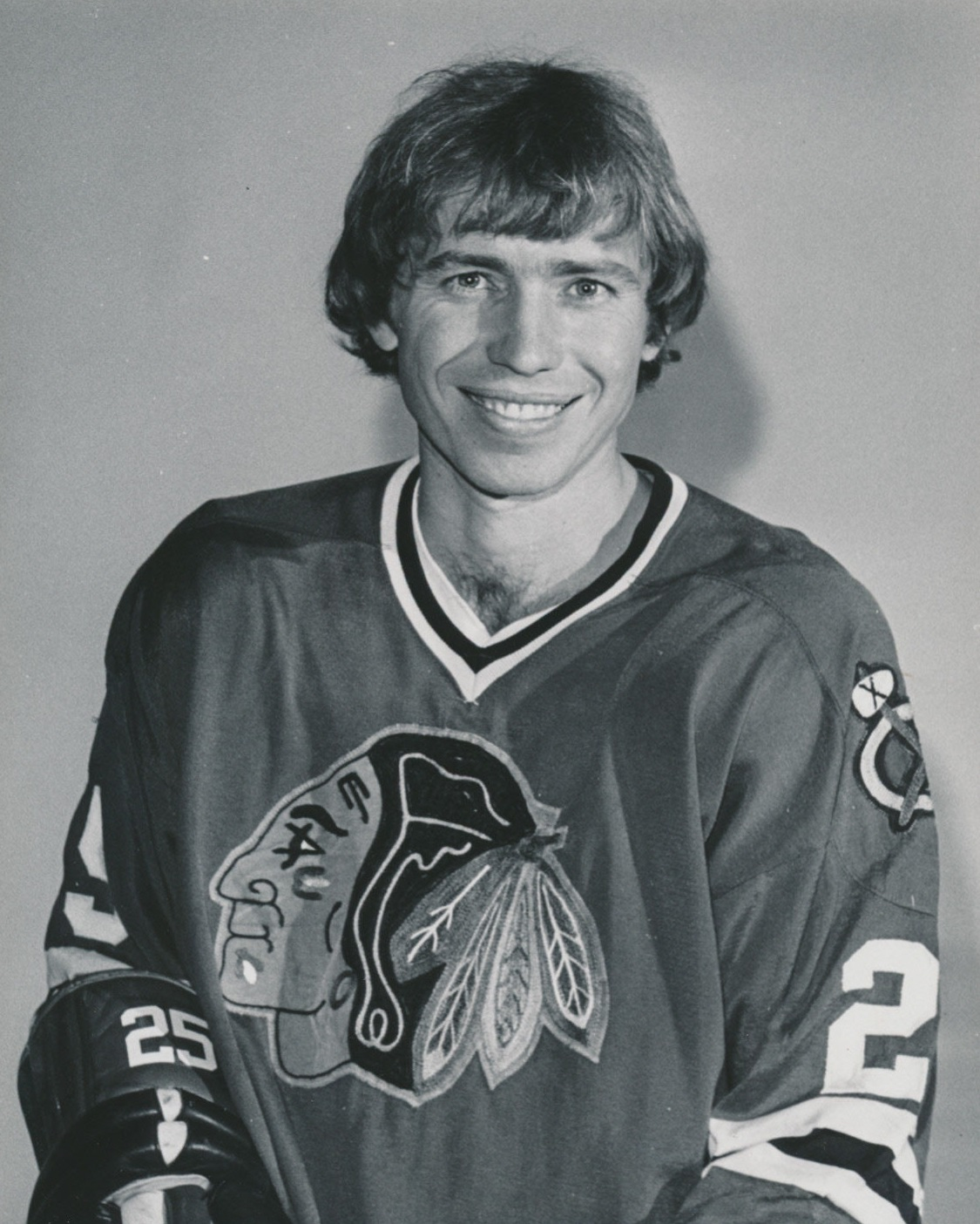
- McKegney in 1976
- Born: May 7, 1947 (age 77); Sarnia, Ontario, Canada
- Height: 5 ft 11 in (180 cm)
- Weight: 165 lb (75 kg; 11 st 11 lb)
- Position: Defenceman
- Shot: Left
- Played for: Chicago Black Hawks; ECS Innsbruck
- Playing career: 1971–1978

Ian Robert McKegney (born May 7, 1947) is a Canadian former ice hockey player. McKegney played three games in the National Hockey League with the Chicago Black Hawks during the 1976–77 season. McKegney spent a season in Sweden in 1971–72 and then mostly with the Dallas Black Hawks of the Central Hockey League. from 1972 to 1977. After his NHL stint he played with the Nova Scotia Voyageurs and Innsbrucker EV in Austria before ending his professional career in 1979.

== Career statistics ==
=== Regular season and playoffs ===
			Regular season					Playoffs
Season	Team	League	GP	G	A	Pts	PIM	GP	G	A	Pts	PIM
1965–66	Sarnia Legionnaires	WOJBHL	—	—	—	—	—	—	—	—	—	—
1966–67	Sarnia Legionnaires	WOJBHL	—	—	—	—	—	—	—	—	—	—
1967–68	University of Waterloo	CIAU	—	—	—	—	—	—	—	—	—	—
1968–69	University of Waterloo	CIAU	—	—	—	—	—	—	—	—	—	—
1969–70	University of Waterloo	CIAU	—	—	—	—	—	—	—	—	—	—
1970–71	University of Waterloo	CIAU	15	2	12	14	15	—	—	—	—	—
1971–72	IFK Luleå	SWE-2	18	5	13	18	—	—	—	—	—	—
1972–73	Dallas Black Hawks	CHL	72	10	24	34	20	7	1	2	3	0
1973–74	Dallas Black Hawks	CHL	65	1	27	28	18	10	2	4	6	4
1974–75	Dallas Black Hawks	CHL	76	10	31	41	21	10	2	5	7	2
1975–76	Dallas Black Hawks	CHL	76	3	29	32	20	10	3	2	5	0
1976–77	Chicago Black Hawks	NHL	3	0	0	0	2	—	—	—	—	—
1976–77	Dallas Black Hawks	CHL	61	6	22	28	18	5	1	1	2	0
1977–78	Nova Scotia Voyageurs	AHL	12	0	5	5	0	11	1	4	5	7
1977–78	ECS Innsbruck	AUT	33	13	19	32	27	—	—	—	—	—
CHL totals			350	30	133	163	97	42	9	14	23	6
NHL totals			3	0	0	0	2	—	—	—	—	—

Preceded by Wayne Schaab	Winner of the Tommy Ivan Trophy; 1975–76	Succeeded by Barclay Plager
