= 1980–81 CHL season =

- League: Central Hockey League
- Sport: Ice hockey
- Number of teams: 9

Regular season
- Regular Season Top Team: Dallas Black Hawks
- Season MVP: Joe Mullen
- Top scorer: Joe Mullen

Adams Cup playoffs
- Adams Cup playoffs MVP: Don Murdoch

Adams Cup
- Champions: Salt Lake Golden Eagles
- Runners-up: Wichita Wind

CHL seasons
- ← 1979–80 1981–82 →

The 1980–81 CHL season was the 18th season of the Central Hockey League, a North American minor professional league. Nine teams participated in the regular season, and the Salt Lake Golden Eagles won the league title.

== Regular season ==
| Central Hockey League | GP | W | L | OTL | GF | GA | Pts |
|---|---|---|---|---|---|---|---|
| Dallas Black Hawks (VAN/TOR) | 79 | 56 | 16 | 7 | 356 | 233 | 119 |
| Salt Lake Golden Eagles (STL) | 80 | 46 | 29 | 5 | 368 | 295 | 97 |
| Indianapolis Checkers (NYI) | 80 | 44 | 30 | 6 | 306 | 238 | 94 |
| Oklahoma City Stars (MIN) | 79 | 39 | 38 | 2 | 312 | 328 | 80 |
| Tulsa Oilers (WPG) | 79 | 33 | 42 | 4 | 285 | 312 | 70 |
| Wichita Wind (EDM) | 80 | 32 | 45 | 3 | 307 | 346 | 67 |
| Fort Worth Texans (COL) | 80 | 24 | 53 | 3 | 201 | 309 | 51 |
| Birmingham Bulls (CGY) | 58 | 17 | 37 | 4 | 204 | 277 | 38 |
| Houston Apollos (LA) | 33 | 12 | 13 | 8 | 97 | 98 | 32 |

== Playoffs ==
Division Semifinal
2 | Salt Lake Golden Eagles | 3
7 | Fort Worth Texans | 2
4 | Oklahoma City Stars | 0
5 | Tulsa Oilers | 3
1 | Dallas Black Hawks
Bye
3 | Indianapolis Checkers | 2
6 | Wichita Wind | 3

Division Final
2 | Salt Lake Golden Eagles | 4
5 | Tulsa Oilers | 1
1 | Dallas Black Hawks | 2
6 | Wichita Wind | 4

Adams Cup Final
2 | Salt Lake Golden Eagles | 4
6 | Wichita Wind | 3
