= NHL intra-league draft =

Annual North American hockey draft

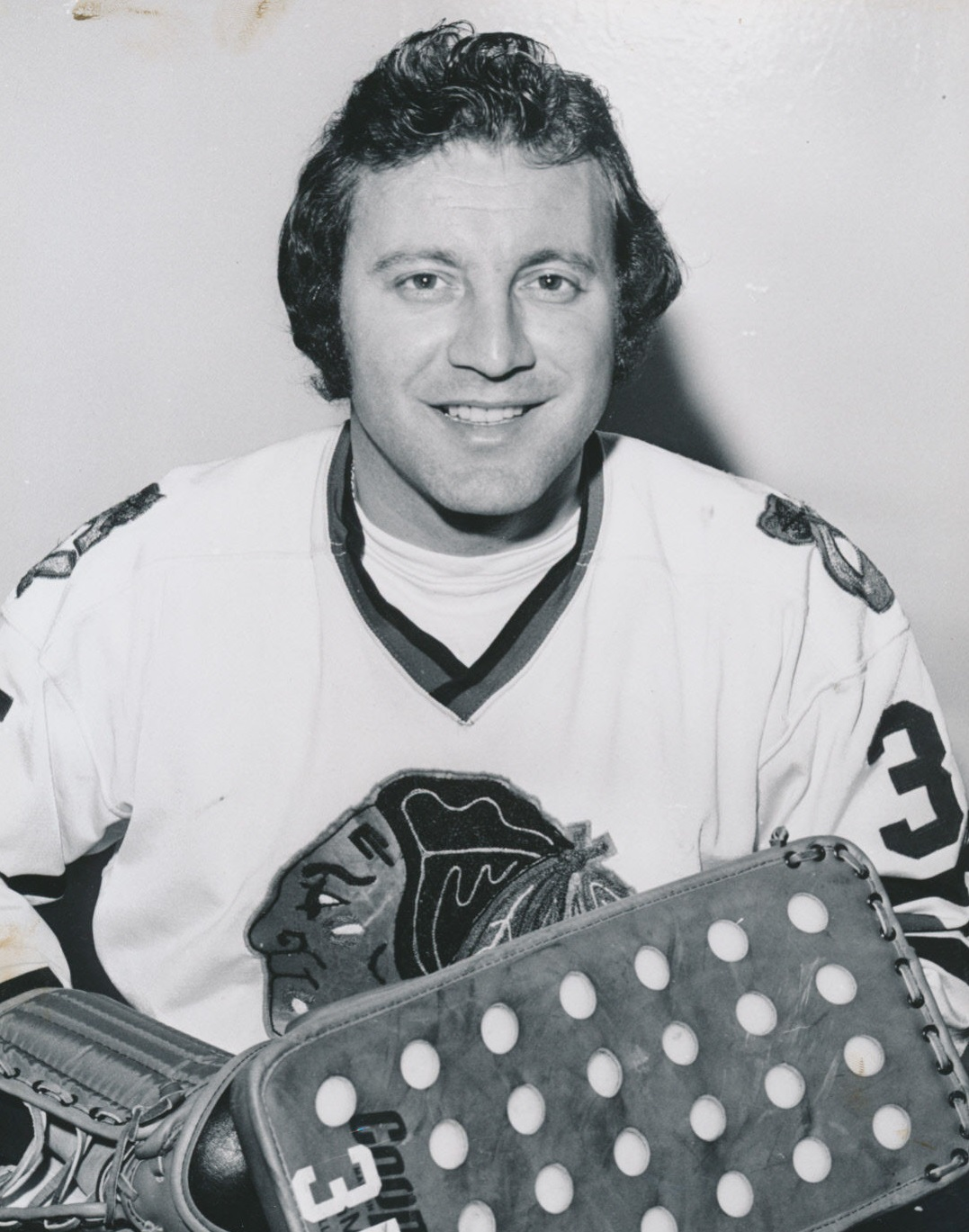
One of the most consequential selections in the NHL intra-league draft occurred in 1969 when the Chicago Black Hawks selected goaltender Tony Esposito from the Montreal Canadiens. Esposito played the rest of his career with Chicago, winning three Vezina Trophies and earning induction to the Hockey Hall of Fame in 1988.

The NHL intra-league was an annual draft held by the National Hockey League (NHL) from 1952 to 1975. The intra-league draft was created to help address the league's competitive balance issues during the Original Six era, as the Detroit Red Wings, Montreal Canadiens, and Toronto Maple Leafs were the only teams to win the Stanley Cup in the ten years preceding the draft's inception. It had an inauspicious start as the first two drafts featured no players being selected, and after the third saw only one player selected, the fourth draft wasn't even held due to unanimous agreement among the six NHL teams that none of the available players was worth drafting. Eventually, more players started being selected in the intra-league draft and was held every year through 1975 (with the exception of 1967 when the NHL expanded in size from six to twelve teams). It was not held in 1976 and was replaced by the NHL waiver draft in 1977.

== Rules ==
From 1956 until 1975, the intra-league draft was held in June during the NHL's summer meetings. A few days prior to the intra-league draft, each NHL club would be required to turn in a list of players to protect from selection. Players under a certain number of professional hockey seasons played and below a minimum number of NHL games played were exempt, as were amateur players NHL clubs owned the rights to.

The order of the intra-league draft was the reverse of the previous season's standings, the non-playoff teams picking twice before playoff teams. Once a team claimed an unprotected player from another team, that team would be required to drop a player from their protection list. The team losing the player would receive a cash payment set by the league before the draft. In the first draft in 1952 this cash payment was set at $10,000 and by the final intra-league draft it increased to $40,000.

== Drafts ==
=== 1952 ===
The 1952 NHL intra-league draft was held on October 5, 1952. No selections were made.

=== 1953 ===
The 1953 NHL intra-league draft was held on September 10, 1953. No selections were made.

=== 1954 ===
The 1954 NHL intra-league draft was held on September 15, 1954. One selection was made.

Round	Pick	Player	Claimed by	Claimed from
1	1	John McCormack	Chicago Black Hawks	Montreal Canadiens

=== 1955 ===
The 1955 NHL intra-league draft was to have taken place on September 7, 1955, however no meeting was held due to a lack of desirable players to select. Protection lists were submitted on September 1. The Intra-League draft was permanently moved to the NHL's summer meetings in June the following year.

=== 1956 ===
The 1956 NHL intra-league draft was held on June 6, 1956. Two selections were made.

Round	Pick	Player	Claimed by	Claimed from
1	1	Larry Cahan	New York Rangers	Toronto Maple Leafs
1	2	Tom McCarthy	Detroit Red Wings	New York Rangers

=== 1957 ===
The 1957 NHL intra-league draft was held on June 5, 1957. Five selections were made.

Round	Pick	Player	Claimed by	Claimed from
1	1	Larry Hillman	Chicago Black Hawks	Detroit Red Wings
1	2	Bob Bailey	Chicago Black Hawks	Detroit Red Wings
1	3	John Hanna	New York Rangers	Montreal Canadiens
1	4	Norm Johnson	Boston Bruins	New York Rangers
2	5	Bronco Horvath	Boston Bruins	Montreal Canadiens

=== 1958 ===
The 1958 NHL intra-league draft was held on June 4, 1958. Ten selections were made.

Round	Pick	Player	Claimed by	Claimed from
1	1	Bert Olmstead	Toronto Maple Leafs	Montreal Canadiens
1	2	Jack Evans	Chicago Black Hawks	New York Rangers
1	3	Jerry Wilson	Toronto Maple Leafs	Montreal Canadiens
1	4	Al Arbour	Chicago Black Hawks	Detroit Red Wings
1	5	Jean-Guy Gendron	Boston Bruins	New York Rangers
1	6	Danny Lewicki	Montreal Canadiens	New York Rangers
2	7	Earl Balfour	Chicago Black Hawks	Toronto Maple Leafs
2	8	Gord Redahl	Boston Bruins	New York Rangers
2	9	Dave Creighton	Montreal Canadiens	New York Rangers
3	10	Earl Reibel	Boston Bruins	Chicago Black Hawks

=== 1959 ===
The 1959 NHL intra-league draft was held on June 10, 1959. Eight selections were made.

Round	Pick	Player	Claimed by	Claimed from
1	1	Gary Aldcorn	Detroit Red Wings	Toronto Maple Leafs
1	2	Irv Spencer	New York Rangers	Montreal Canadiens
1	3	John McKenzie	Detroit Red Wings	Chicago Black Hawks
1	4	Ian Cushenan	New York Rangers	Chicago Black Hawks
1	5	Bruce Gamble	Boston Bruins	New York Rangers
2	6	Brian Cullen	New York Rangers	Toronto Maple Leafs
2	7	Aut Erickson	Boston Bruins	Chicago Black Hawks
3	8	Charlie Burns	Boston Bruins	Detroit Red Wings

=== 1960 ===
The 1960 NHL intra-league draft was held on June 8, 1960. Nine selections were made.

Round	Pick	Player	Claimed by	Claimed from
1	1	Billy McNeill	New York Rangers	Detroit Red Wings
1	2	Ted Green	Boston Bruins	Montreal Canadiens
1	3	Ted Hampson	New York Rangers	Toronto Maple Leafs
1	4	Jim Bartlett	Boston Bruins	New York Rangers
1	5	Parker MacDonald	Detroit Red Wings	New York Rangers
1	6	Larry Hillman	Toronto Maple Leafs	Boston Bruins
2	7	Jim Morrison	New York Rangers	Chicago Black Hawks
2	8	Tom Thurlby	Boston Bruins	Montreal Canadiens
2	9	Guy Rousseau	Toronto Maple Leafs	Montreal Canadiens

=== 1961 ===
The 1961 NHL intra-league draft was held on June 14, 1961. Eight selections were made.

Round	Pick	Player	Claimed by	Claimed from
1	1	Pat Stapleton	Boston Bruins	Chicago Black Hawks
1	2	Jean-Guy Gendron	New York Rangers	Montreal Canadiens
1	3	Earl Balfour	Boston Bruins	Chicago Black Hawks
1	4	Bronco Horvath	Chicago Black Hawks	Boston Bruins
1	5	Al Arbour	Toronto Maple Leafs	Chicago Black Hawks
2	6	Aut Erickson	Chicago Black Hawks	Boston Bruins
3	7	Vic Hadfield	New York Rangers	Chicago Black Hawks
4	8	Orland Kurtenbach	Boston Bruins	New York Rangers

=== 1962 ===
The 1962 NHL intra-league draft was held on June 6, 1962. Nine selections were made.

Round	Pick	Player	Claimed by	Claimed from
1	1	Jean-Guy Gendron	Boston Bruins	New York Rangers
1	2	Alex Faulkner	Detroit Red Wings	Toronto Maple Leafs
1	3	Warren Godfrey	Boston Bruins	Detroit Red Wings
1	4	Barclay Plager	Detroit Red Wings	Montreal Canadiens
1	5	Bert Olmstead	New York Rangers	Toronto Maple Leafs
2	6	Irv Spencer	Boston Bruins	New York Rangers
2	7	Floyd Smith	Detroit Red Wings	New York Rangers
2	8	Bronco Horvath	New York Rangers	Chicago Black Hawks
2	9	Ed Van Impe	Toronto Maple Leafs	Chicago Black Hawks

=== 1963 ===
The 1963 NHL intra-league draft was held on June 5, 1963. Six selections were made.

Round	Pick	Player	Claimed by	Claimed from
1	1	Andy Hebenton	Boston Bruins	New York Rangers
1	2	Val Fonteyne	New York Rangers	Detroit Red Wings
1	3	Wayne Rivers	Boston Bruins	Detroit Red Wings
1	4	Irv Spencer	Detroit Red Wings	Boston Bruins
2	5	Ted Hampson	Detroit Red Wings	New York Rangers
3	6	Art Stratton	Detroit Red Wings	Chicago Black Hawks

=== 1964 ===
The 1964 NHL intra-league draft was held on June 10, 1964. Seven selections were made.

Round	Pick	Player	Claimed by	Claimed from
1	1	Jim Mikol	New York Rangers	Boston Bruins
1	2	Bob Woytowich	Boston Bruins	New York Rangers
1	3	Gary Bergman	Detroit Red Wings	Montreal Canadiens
1	4	Dickie Moore	Toronto Maple Leafs	Montreal Canadiens
2	5	Murray Hall	Detroit Red Wings	Chicago Black Hawks
3	6	George Gardner	Detroit Red Wings	Boston Bruins
3	7	Terry Sawchuk	Toronto Maple Leafs	Detroit Red Wings

=== 1965 ===
The 1965 NHL intra-league draft was held on June 9, 1965. Seven selections were made.

Round	Pick	Player	Claimed by	Claimed from
1	1	Gerry Cheevers	Boston Bruins	Toronto Maple Leafs
1	2	Earl Ingarfield	New York Rangers	Montreal Canadiens
1	3	Pat Stapleton	Chicago Black Hawks	Toronto Maple Leafs
1	4	Bryan Watson	Detroit Red Wings	Chicago Black Hawks
2	5	Poul Popiel	Boston Bruins	Chicago Black Hawks
3	6	Norm Schmitz	Boston Bruins	Montreal Canadiens
4	7	Keith Wright	Boston Bruins	New York Rangers

=== 1966 ===
The 1966 NHL intra-league draft was held on June 15, 1966. Seven selections were made and twelve players total changed teams.

Round	Pick	Player	Claimed by	Claimed from	Compensation
1	1	Orland Kurtenbach	New York Rangers	Toronto Maple Leafs	claim: John Brenneman
1	2	Al LeBrun	Detroit Red Wings	New York Rangers	claim: Max Mestinsek
1	3	Don Blackburn	Toronto Maple Leafs	Montreal Canadiens	claim: Wally Boyer
1	4	Wally Boyer	Chicago Black Hawks	Montreal Canadiens	claim: Al MacNeil
2	5	Al MacNeil	New York Rangers	Montreal Canadiens	claim: Mike McMahon Jr.
2	6	Ted Taylor	Detroit Red Wings	Montreal Canadiens	claim: Pat Quinn
3	7	Ray Cullen	Detroit Red Wings	New York Rangers	claim: Bryan Campbell

=== 1968 ===
The 1968 NHL intra-league draft was held on June 12, 1968. Eleven selections were made and 17 players total changed teams. Protection lists were released prior to the draft.

Round	Pick	Player	Claimed by	Claimed from	Compensation
1	1	Carol Vadnais	Oakland Seals	Montreal Canadiens	claim: Larry Cahan
1	2	Brian Conacher	Detroit Red Wings	Toronto Maple Leafs	claim: Gary Marsh
1	3	Charlie Burns	Pittsburgh Penguins	Oakland Seals	claim: George Konik
1	4	Larry Mickey	Toronto Maple Leafs	New York Rangers	claim: Larry Hillman
1	5	Larry Hillman	Minnesota North Stars	New York Rangers	claim: Bill Plager
1	6	Jacques Plante	St. Louis Blues	New York Rangers	cash
1	7	Ron Buchanan	Philadelphia Flyers	Boston Bruins	claim: Jean Gauthier
2	8	Fern Rivard	Minnesota North Stars	Philadelphia Flyers	cash
2	9	Myron Stankiewicz	St. Louis Blues	Los Angeles Kings	cash
3	10	Larry Hale	Philadelphia Flyers	Minnesota North Stars	claim: Bill Sutherland
4	11	Bill Sutherland	Toronto Maple Leafs	Minnesota North Stars	claim: Duane Rupp

=== 1969 ===
The 1969 NHL intra-league draft was held on June 11, 1969. 16 selections were made and 22 players total changed teams. Protection lists were released prior to the draft.

Round	Pick	Player	Claimed by	Claimed from	Compensation
1	1	Dick Sentes	Minnesota North Stars	Montreal Canadiens	cash
1	2	Tony Esposito	Chicago Black Hawks	Montreal Canadiens	claim: Jack Norris
1	3	Glen Sather	Pittsburgh Penguins	Boston Bruins	claim: Bill Speer
1	4	Matt Ravlich	Detroit Red Wings	Chicago Black Hawks	cash
1	5	Larry Hillman	Philadelphia Flyers	Montreal Canadiens	claim: Jean-Guy Gendron
1	6	Andre Boudrias	St. Louis Blues	Chicago Black Hawks	cash
1	7	Marv Edwards	Toronto Maple Leafs	Pittsburgh Penguins	claim: Al Smith
1	8	Larry Mickey	Montreal Canadiens	Toronto Maple Leafs	cash
2	9	Grant Erickson	Minnesota North Stars	Boston Bruins	cash
2	10	Lou Angotti	Chicago Black Hawks	St. Louis Blues	claim: Bobby Schmautz
2	11	Dean Prentice	Pittsburgh Penguins	Detroit Red Wings	cash
2	12	Ron Anderson	St. Louis Blues	Los Angeles Kings	cash
3	13	Charlie Burns	Minnesota North Stars	Pittsburgh Penguins	cash
3	14	Bob Blackburn	Pittsburgh Penguins	New York Rangers	claim: Forbes Kennedy
3	15	Wayne Maki	St. Louis Blues	Chicago Black Hawks	cash
4	16	Howie Menard	Chicago Black Hawks	Los Angeles Kings	cash

=== 1970 ===
The 1970 NHL intra-league draft was held on June 9, 1970. 13 selections were made and 17 players total changed teams.

Round	Pick	Player	Claimed by	Claimed from	Compensation
1	1	Paul Curtis	Los Angeles Kings	Montreal Canadiens	claim: Bill Inglis
1	2	Guy Trottier	Toronto Maple Leafs	New York Rangers	cash
1	3	Bill Lesuk	Philadelphia Flyers	Boston Bruins	claim: Dick Cherry
1	4	Bob McCord	Montreal Canadiens	Minnesota North Stars	claim: Ted Harris
1	5	Gary Croteau	Oakland Seals	Detroit Red Wings	cash
1	6	John Gofton	Minnesota North Stars	Rochester Americans (AHL)	cash
1	7	Lowell MacDonald	Pittsburgh Penguins	Los Angeles Kings	claim: Craig Cameron
1	8	Steve Atkinson	St. Louis Blues	Hershey Bears (AHL)	cash
1	9	Gerry Lemire	New York Rangers	St. Louis Blues	cash
1	10	Tom Martin	Detroit Red Wings	Phoenix Roadrunners (WHL)	cash
2	11	Paul Andrea	Oakland Seals	Vancouver Canucks (WHL)	cash
2	12	Jean-Guy Lagace	Minnesota North Stars	Pittsburgh Penguins	cash
2	13	Chris Evans	St. Louis Blues	Phoenix Roadrunnners (WHL)	cash

=== 1971 ===
The 1971 NHL intra-league draft was held on June 8, 1971. 23 selections were made and 25 players total changed teams. The draft lasted a record 13 rounds due to a loophole exploited by Buffalo Sabres general manager Punch Imlach, who noticed there was no rule preventing a team from reclaiming a player it had dropped from its protection list for a previous selection. Buffalo was involved in every selection from the fourth-round through the end of the draft.

Round	Pick	Player	Claimed by	Claimed from	Compensation
1	1	Wayne Carleton	California Golden Seals	Boston Bruins	cash
1	2	Al Smith	Detroit Red Wings	Pittsburgh Penguins	claim: Jim Rutherford
1	3	Dennis Kearns	Vancouver Canucks	Chicago Black Hawks	cash
1	4	Dave Burrows	Pittsburgh Penguins	Chicago Black Hawks	cash
1	5	Ray McKay	Buffalo Sabres	Chicago Black Hawks	cash
1	6	Gary Edwards	Los Angeles Kings	Buffalo Sabres	cash
1	7	Larry Brown	Philadelphia Flyers	New York Rangers	cash
1	8	Don Marshall	Toronto Maple Leafs	Buffalo Sabres	cash
1	9	Michel Parizeau	St. Louis Blues	New York Rangers	cash
2	10	Frank Hughes	California Golden Seals	Toronto Maple Leafs	cash
2	11	Fred Speck	Vancouver Canucks	Detroit Red Wings	cash
2	12	Tim Horton	Pittsburgh Penguins	New York Rangers	cash
2	13	Rene Robert	Buffalo Sabres	Toronto Maple Leafs	cash
2	14	Frank Spring	Philadelphia Flyers	Boston Bruins	claim: Garry Peters
3	15	Stan Gilbertson	California Golden Seals	Boston Bruins	cash
3	16	Rey Comeau	Vancouver Canucks	Montreal Canadiens	cash
3	17	Hugh Harris	Buffalo Sabres	Montreal Canadiens	cash
3	18	Brian Lavender	Minnesota North Stars	Montreal Canadiens	claim: Bob Murdoch
4		Dick Duff	Buffalo Sabres	Buffalo Sabres	cash
4	19	Rene Robert	Pittsburgh Penguins	Buffalo Sabres	cash
5		Reg Fleming	Buffalo Sabres	Buffalo Sabres	cash
6	20	Danny Lawson	Buffalo Sabres	Minnesota North Stars	cash
7		Reg Fleming	Buffalo Sabres	Buffalo Sabres	cash
8	21	Rod Zaine	Buffalo Sabres	Pittsburgh Penguins	cash
9		Reg Fleming	Buffalo Sabres	Buffalo Sabres	cash
10	22	Tom Miller	Buffalo Sabres	Detroit Red Wings	cash
11		Reg Fleming	Buffalo Sabres	Buffalo Sabres	cash
12	23	Ken Murray	Buffalo Sabres	Toronto Maple Leafs	cash
13		Reg Fleming	Buffalo Sabres	Buffalo Sabres	cash

=== 1972 ===
The 1972 NHL intra-league draft was held on June 5, 1972. Six selections were made and eight players total changed teams.

Round	Pick	Player	Claimed by	Claimed from	Compensation
1	1	Don Tannahill	Vancouver Canucks	Boston Bruins	cash
1	2	Barry Long	Los Angeles Kings	Chicago Black Hawks	claim: Bill Orban
1	3	Tim Horton	Buffalo Sabres	Pittsburgh Penguins	cash
1	4	Larry Pleau	Toronto Maple Leafs	Montreal Canadiens	claim: Brad Selwood
2	5	Gerry O'Flaherty	Vancouver Canucks	Toronto Maple Leafs	cash
2	6	Doug Volmar	Los Angeles Kings	Detroit Red Wings	cash

=== 1973 ===
The 1973 NHL intra-league draft was held on June 12, 1973. Six selections were made and seven players total changed teams.

Round	Pick	Player	Claimed by	Claimed from	Compensation
1	1	Bert Marshall	New York Islanders	New York Rangers	cash
1	2	Ray McKay	California Golden Seals	Buffalo Sabres	cash
1	3	Doug Mohns	Atlanta Flames	Minnesota North Stars	claim: Bill Plager
1	4	Ron Jones	Pittsburgh Penguins	Boston Bruins	cash
1	5	Lou Angotti	St. Louis Blues	Chicago Black Hawks	cash
1	6	Joe Noris	Buffalo Sabres	St. Louis Blues	cash

=== 1974 ===
The 1974 NHL intra-league draft was held on June 10, 1974. Five selections were made and six players total changed teams.

Round	Pick	Player	Claimed by	Claimed from	Compensation
1	1	Jim Neilson	California Golden Seals	New York Rangers	claim: Walt McKechnie
1	2	Dave Fortier	New York Islanders	Philadelphia Flyers	cash
1	3	Jim Wiley	Vancouver Canucks	Pittsburgh Penguins	cash
1	4	Brian Ogilvie	St. Louis Blues	Chicago Black Hawks	cash
1	5	Ron Busniuk	Detroit Red Wings	Buffalo Sabres	cash

=== 1975 ===
The 1975 NHL intra-league draft was held on June 17, 1975. Two selections were made. The Pittsburgh Penguins were not permitted to participate due to bankruptcy.

Round	Pick	Player	Claimed by	Claimed from	Compensation
1	1	Dale Lewis	New York Rangers	Los Angeles Kings	cash
1	2	Hartland Monahan	Washington Capitals	New York Rangers	cash
