= Bill Orban (ice hockey) =

Canadian ice hockey player

- Born: February 20, 1944 (age 82) Regina, Saskatchewan, Canada
- Height: 6 ft 0 in (183 cm)
- Weight: 180 lb (82 kg; 12 st 12 lb)
- Position: Left wing
- Shot: Left
- Played for: Chicago Black Hawks; Minnesota North Stars
- Playing career: 1963–1975

William Terrence Orban (born February 20, 1944) is a Canadian former professional ice hockey forward who played 114 games in the National Hockey League for the Chicago Black Hawks and Minnesota North Stars between 1967 and 1970. The rest of his career, which lasted from 1963 to 1975, was spent in the minor leagues.

== Career statistics ==
=== Regular season and playoffs ===
			Regular season					Playoffs
Season	Team	League	GP	G	A	Pts	PIM	GP	G	A	Pts	PIM
1962–63	Saskatoon Quakers	SJHL	49	22	20	42	126	—	—	—	—	—
1962–63	Saskatoon Quakers	SSHL	—	—	—	—	—	3	2	2	4	0
1963–64	Saskatoon Quakers	SJHL	53	44	55	99	101	12	16	12	28	15
1964–65	Fort Wayne Komets	IHL	54	25	36	61	70	10	7	7	14	33
1965–66	Los Angeles Blades	WHL	72	11	20	31	55	—	—	—	—	—
1966–67	Los Angeles Blades	WHL	72	14	12	26	33	—	—	—	—	—
1967–68	Chicago Black Hawks	NHL	39	3	2	5	17	3	0	0	0	0
1968–69	Chicago Black Hawks	NHL	45	4	6	10	33	—	—	—	—	—
1968–69	Minnesota North Stars	NHL	21	1	5	6	10	—	—	—	—	—
1969–70	Minnesota North Stars	NHL	9	0	2	2	7	—	—	—	—	—
1969–70	Iowa Stars	CHL	65	31	44	75	78	10	4	2	6	27
1970–71	Cleveland Barons	AHL	27	6	9	15	34	—	—	—	—	—
1970–71	Springfield Kings	AHL	8	0	5	5	11	12	10	6	16	16
1971–72	Springfield Kings	AHL	42	13	18	31	55	5	0	0	0	9
1972–73	Portland Buckaroos	WHL	18	8	3	11	18	—	—	—	—	—
1973–74	Tulsa Oilers	CHL	62	16	20	36	38	—	—	—	—	—
1974–75	Dallas Black Hawks	CHL	72	15	24	39	46	10	5	3	8	2
CHL totals			199	62	88	150	162	20	9	5	14	29
NHL totals			114	8	15	23	67	3	0	0	0	0
