= Art Stratton =

Canadian ice hockey player (born 1935)

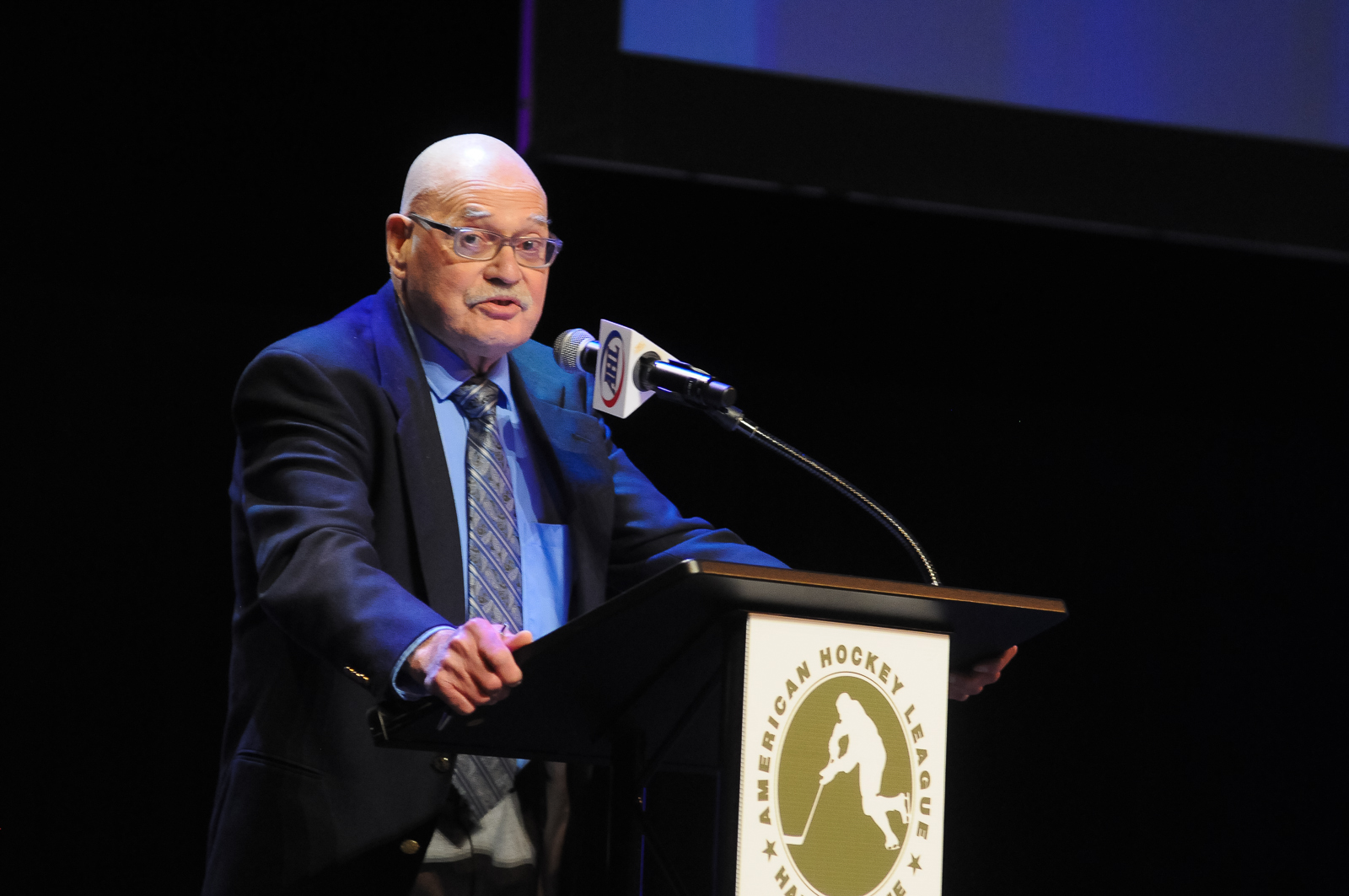
- Stratton in 2015
- Born: October 8, 1935 (age 91) Winnipeg, Manitoba, Canada
- Height: 6 ft 1 in (185 cm)
- Weight: 180 lb (82 kg; 12 st 12 lb)
- Position: Centre
- Shot: Left
- Played for: New York Rangers; Detroit Red Wings; Chicago Black Hawks; Pittsburgh Penguins; Philadelphia Flyers
- Playing career: 1956–1976

Arthur Stratton (born October 8, 1935) is a Canadian former professional ice hockey player.

== Career ==
He played 95 games in the National Hockey League for 5 separate teams. These included the New York Rangers (18 games), Detroit Red Wings (5 games), Chicago Black Hawks (2 games), Pittsburgh Penguins (58 games), and Philadelphia Flyers (12 games). Stratton's NHL career was scattered across 4 playing seasons between 1959 and 1968, where he scored 18 goals and 33 assists.

Stratton's professional hockey career was more illustrious than his NHL statistics demonstrate. Starting in 1955 and playing straight until 1976, he was only in the NHL for 4 seasons and with 5 different teams. Stratton contributed to the following professional hockey teams during his lengthy and productive career: St. Catharines Teepees, Cleveland Barons, North Bay Trappers, Winnipeg Warriors, Springfield Indians, Kitchener-Waterloo Beavers, Buffalo Bisons, Pittsburgh Hornets, St. Louis Braves, Seattle Totems, Tidewater Wings, Virginia Red Wings, Rochester Americans, Richmond Robins and Hampton Gulls. He holds the American Hockey League record for points in a game with 9 (all assists) while playing with the Buffalo Bisons against Pittsburgh on March 17, 1963.

Stratton also coached the Syracuse Eagles for part of the 1974/1975 American Hockey League Season. That year, the Eagles were last in the league standings, with a record of 21 games under .500.

== Awards and achievements ==
- MJHL Co-Scoring Champion (1955)
- MJHL Goal Scoring Leader (1955)
- MJHL First Team Allstar (1955)
- Northern Ontario Hockey Association Rookie of the Year (1957)
- WHL Rookie of the Year Prairie Division (1958)
- AHL First All-Star Team (1963, 1964, & 1965)
- Calder Cup (AHL) Championship (1963)
- AHL Most Valuable Player (1965 & 1974)
- AHL Scoring Champion (1965)
- CPHL First All-Star Team (1966 & 1967)
- CPHL Scoring Champion (1966 & 1967)
- CPHL Most Valuable Player (1966 & 1967)
- AHL Second All-Star Team (1974)
- SHL Second All-Star Team (1976)
- SHL Most Valuable Player (1976)
- Honoured Member of the Manitoba Hockey Hall of Fame

== Career statistics ==
=== Regular season and playoffs ===
			Regular season					Playoffs
Season	Team	League	GP	G	A	Pts	PIM	GP	G	A	Pts	PIM
1953–54	Winnipeg Barons	MJHL	36	17	28	45	39	6	0	5	5	0
1954–55	Winnipeg Barons	MJHL	32	50	26	76	39	5	3	3	6	0
1955–56	St. Catharines Teepees	OHA	48	37	42	79	49	6	1	3	4	17
1955–56	Cleveland Barons	AHL	1	0	0	0	0	1	0	1	1	2
1956–57	North Bay Trappers	NOHA	60	29	34	63	23	13	5	8	13	12
1957–58	Winnipeg Warriors	WHL	70	23	53	76	12	7	4	1	5	4
1958–59	Cleveland Barons	AHL	62	29	47	76	40	7	1	3	4	2
1959–60	New York Rangers	NHL	18	2	5	7	2	—	—	—	—	—
1959–60	Springfield Indians	AHL	46	12	44	56	29	—	—	—	—	—
1960–61	Springfield Indians	AHL	48	16	41	57	16	—	—	—	—	—
1960–61	Kitchener-Waterloo Beavers	EPHL	16	7	5	12	4	7	0	2	2	0
1961–62	Buffalo Bisons	AHL	63	15	24	39	52	6	1	3	4	2
1962–63	Buffalo Bisons	AHL	70	20	70	90	18	13	4	15	19	2
1963–64	Detroit Red Wings	NHL	5	0	3	3	2	—	—	—	—	—
1963–64	Pittsburgh Hornets	AHL	66	17	65	82	29	5	0	2	2	4
1964–65	Buffalo Bisons	AHL	71	25	84	109	32	9	1	5	6	4
1965–66	Chicago Black Hawks	NHL	2	0	0	0	0	—	—	—	—	—
1965–66	St. Louis Braves	CPHL	66	28	66	94	14	5	0	1	1	2
1966–67	St. Louis Braves	CPHL	67	34	56	90	46	—	—	—	—	—
1967–68	Pittsburgh Penguins	NHL	58	16	21	37	16	—	—	—	—	—
1967–68	Philadelphia Flyers	NHL	12	0	4	4	4	5	0	0	0	0
1968–69	Seattle Totems	WHL	66	15	44	59	58	4	0	0	0	4
1969–70	Seattle Totems	WHL	59	24	55	79	22	—	—	—	—	—
1970–71	Seattle Totems	WHL	71	17	31	48	40	—	—	—	—	—
1971–72	Seattle Totems	WHL	11	1	6	7	6	—	—	—	—	—
1971–72	Tidewater Wings	AHL	61	15	41	56	54	—	—	—	—	—
1972–73	Virginia Wings	AHL	76	30	50	80	32	12	4	4	8	0
1973–74	Rochester Americans	AHL	76	24	71	95	118	6	2	6	8	4
1974–75	Richmond Robins	AHL	29	8	18	26	10	7	1	2	3	10
1975–76	Hampton Gulls	SHL	70	14	64	78	112	9	2	3	5	2
AHL totals			669	211	555	766	430	66	14	41	55	30
WHL totals			277	80	189	269	138	11	4	1	5	8
NHL totals			95	18	33	51	24	5	0	0	0	0

Preceded by Tom McCarthy	CPHL Leading Scorer; 1965–66; 1966–67	Succeeded by Ron Ward
Preceded by Cesare Maniago	CPHL Most Valuable Player Award; 1965–66; 1966–67	Succeeded by Bryan Watson
