= Barclay Plager =

Canadian ice hockey player and coach

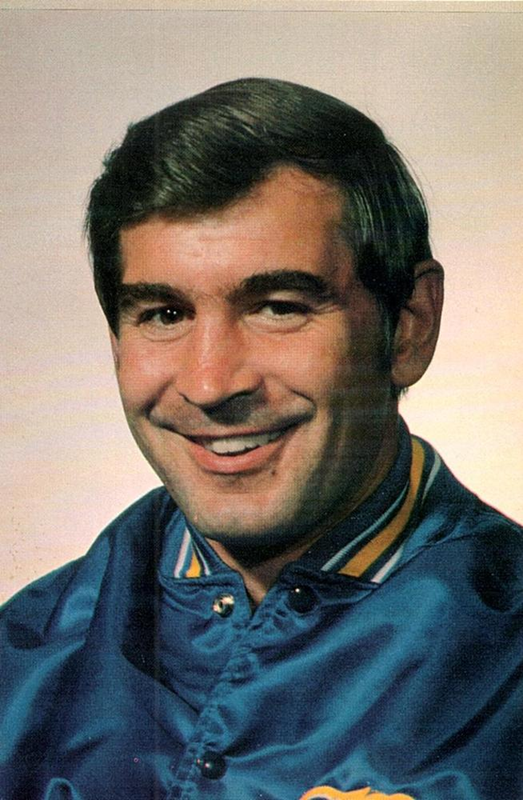
- Plager in 1978
- Born: March 26, 1941 Kirkland Lake, Ontario, Canada
- Died: February 6, 1988 (aged 46) Creve Coeur, Missouri, U.S.
- Height: 5 ft 10 in (178 cm)
- Weight: 175 lb (79 kg; 12 st 7 lb)
- Position: Defence
- Shot: Left
- Played for: St. Louis Blues
- Playing career: 1961–1978

Barclay Graham Plager (March 26, 1941 – February 6, 1988) was a Canadian professional ice hockey defenceman and coach for the St. Louis Blues.

== Playing career ==
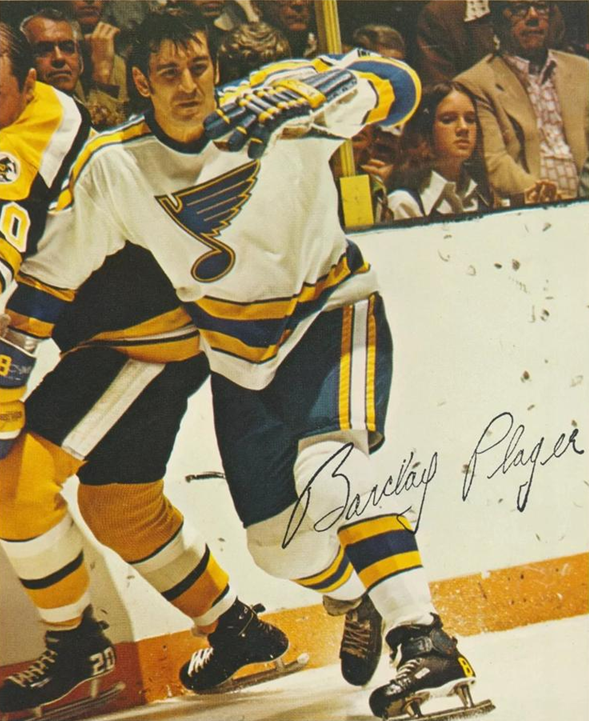
1973 photo of Plager in action for St. Louis Blues

The oldest of three hockey playing brothers (with Bill and Bob), Plager played junior league hockey with the Peterborough Petes of the Ontario Hockey Association before spending six seasons in the minor leagues, cementing a reputation as a hard-nosed defensive defenceman. His reputation was established while still in juniors, when he had a notable fight with his own brother Bob, who was playing for the rival Guelph Royals. Plager spent the 1964 season with the Omaha Knights of the Central Professional Hockey League (CPHL), leading the league in assists and winning best defenceman accolades before being sold by the Detroit Red Wings to the Montreal Canadiens for $20,000. He played the majority of the next three seasons with the Springfield Indians of the AHL.

With the 1967 NHL Expansion, many new jobs opened up in the National Hockey League, and Plager was acquired with Red Berenson by the St. Louis Blues from the New York Rangers, which held his rights. The deal proved extremely successful for the Blues, for Berenson became the first great offensive star of the newly minted Western Division, while Plager anchored a stingy defence that allowed the fewest goals in the NHL in 1969, the second fewest in 1970, and the third fewest in 1971. Behind Plager's leadership—he was named the second captain in team history in 1970, the Blues made the Stanley Cup finals their first three seasons. The three Plager brothers played together for four seasons in St. Louis, with Barclay and Bob together on the Blues' defence for eleven seasons, then widely seen as the "Plagers' team".

== Post-NHL career ==
With his career winding down, Plager was named player-coach of the Blues' Kansas City CHL farm team in 1977, leading his club into the finals and being named the league's most valuable player. He retired as a player during the following season when he was named as head coach of the Blues, succeeding Leo Boivin. In his one full season as Blues' coach, 1979, however, the Blues had their worst season in franchise history, and he was relieved of duties the following season.

On March 24, 1981, prior to a game with the New York Islanders, Barclay Plager Night was held and his No. 8 was retired.

In 1981, Plager was named assistant coach of the Blues, and save for another stint as interim head coach in the 1983 season, served as such until his death from cancer in 1988.

Plager's son Kevin was a hockey player in his own right, following four years of college hockey with five in the minor leagues. He currently coaches high school hockey in Missouri.

== Death ==
In 1984, he was diagnosed with inoperable brain tumors and had to undergo chemotherapy treatments after suffering dizzy spells thought to be the result of an old head injury. In early 1987, Plager had a successful operation to remove a brain tumor with a heat treatment, but when a new and rapidly growing tumor was discovered later that year, he refused treatment because he was informed that extensive brain damage might occur. He entered the hospital late in January 1988, and died on February 6, 1988, of brain cancer.

At the All-Star Game February 9, 1988, a moment of silence was held at the St. Louis Arena in his memory.

== Career achievements and facts ==
- Retired with 44 goals, 187 assists, 231 points and 1115 penalty minutes in 614 games, all with St. Louis
- Was the Blues' career leader in games played and penalty minutes at the time of his retirement
- Played in NHL All-Star Game in 1970, 1971, 1973 and 1974
- Led the NHL in penalty minutes in 1968 with 153 playing only 49 games
- His No. 8 jersey has been retired by the St. Louis Blues

== Career statistics ==
=== Regular season and playoffs ===
			Regular season					Playoffs
Season	Team	League	GP	G	A	Pts	PIM	GP	G	A	Pts	PIM
1957–58	Québec Baronets	MMJHL	—	—	—	—	—	—	—	—	—	—
1957–58	Peterborough Petes	OHA	4	0	0	0	2	—	—	—	—	—
1958–59	Peterborough Petes	OHA	54	4	16	20	252	19	6	6	12	74
1958–59	Peterborough Petes	M-Cup	—	—	—	—	—	12	0	2	2	62
1959–60	Peterborough Petes	OHA	48	8	27	35	165	12	1	7	8	37
1960–61	Peterborough Petes	OHA	48	11	33	44	165	3	0	0	0	23
1960–61	Hull-Ottawa Canadiens	EPHL	3	0	0	0	2	—	—	—	—	—
1961–62	Québec Aces	AHL	1	0	1	1	2	—	—	—	—	—
1961–62	Hull-Ottawa Canadiens	EPHL	60	8	16	24	102	10	1	1	2	22
1962–63	Pittsburgh Hornets	AHL	13	0	1	1	15	—	—	—	—	—
1962–63	Edmonton Flyers	WHL	52	2	18	20	67	—	—	—	—	—
1963–64	Omaha Knights	CPHL	70	14	61	75	208	10	2	11	13	29
1964–65	Springfield Indians	AHL	39	3	16	19	65	—	—	—	—	—
1965–66	Springfield Indians	AHL	58	11	20	31	54	6	1	0	1	0
1966–67	Springfield Indians	AHL	36	6	12	18	60	—	—	—	—	—
1966–67	Omaha Knights	CHL	11	1	10	11	39	12	3	8	11	42
1967–68	St. Louis Blues	NHL	49	5	15	20	153	18	2	5	7	73
1967–68	Buffalo Bisons	AHL	20	2	13	15	37	—	—	—	—	—
1968–69	St. Louis Blues	NHL	61	4	26	30	120	12	0	4	4	31
1969–70	St. Louis Blues	NHL	75	6	26	32	128	13	0	2	2	20
1970–71	St. Louis Blues	NHL	69	4	20	24	172	6	0	3	3	10
1971–72	St. Louis Blues	NHL	78	7	22	29	176	11	1	4	5	21
1972–73	St. Louis Blues	NHL	68	8	25	33	102	5	0	1	1	0
1973–74	St. Louis Blues	NHL	72	6	20	26	99	—	—	—	—	—
1974–75	St. Louis Blues	NHL	76	4	24	28	96	2	0	1	1	14
1975–76	St. Louis Blues	NHL	64	0	8	8	67	1	0	0	0	13
1976–77	St. Louis Blues	NHL	2	0	1	1	2	—	—	—	—	—
1976–77	Kansas City Blues	CHL	75	6	42	48	157	9	2	4	6	12
1977–78	Salt Lake Golden Eagles	CHL	46	2	19	21	80	—	—	—	—	—
NHL totals			614	44	187	231	1115	68	3	20	23	182

== Coaching record ==
Team	Year	Regular season						Postseason
Team	Year	G	W	L	T	Pts	Division rank	Result
St. Louis Blues	1977–78	26	9	11	6	24	4th in Smythe	Missed playoffs
St. Louis Blues	1978–79	80	18	50	12	48	3rd in Smythe	Missed playoffs
St. Louis Blues	1979–80	24	7	14	3	17	2nd in Smythe	Fired
St. Louis Blues	1982–83	48	15	21	12	42	4th in Norris	Lost in 1st round
Total		178	49	96	33			

Preceded by Jim Roberts	St. Louis Blues captain 1972–76	Succeeded by Red Berenson
Preceded by Ian McKegney	Winner of the Tommy Ivan Trophy; 1976–77	Succeeded by Doug Palazzari
Preceded by Leo Boivin; Emile Francis	Head coach of the St. Louis Blues; 1978–79; 1982–83	Succeeded by Red Berenson; Jacques Demers
