= Bobby Francis =

Canadian-born American ice hockey player and coach

- Born: December 5, 1958 (age 67) North Battleford, Saskatchewan, Canada
- Height: 5 ft 9 in (175 cm)
- Weight: 174 lb (79 kg; 12 st 6 lb)
- Position: Centre
- Shot: Right
- Played for: Detroit Red Wings
- NHL draft: Undrafted
- Playing career: 1980–1987

Robert Emile Francis (born December 5, 1958) is a Canadian-American former professional ice hockey player and coach. He played 14 games in the National Hockey League (NHL) with the Detroit Red Wings during the 1982–83 season, though most of his career was spent in the minor leagues. He was the head coach of the Phoenix Coyotes of the from June 1999 to February 2004. In 2002 Francis became the first Coyotes' coach to win the Jack Adams Award. He is the son of former NHL general manager and coach Emile Francis.

== Coaching career ==
Francis served as a player-coach with the Salt Lake Golden Eagles of the International Hockey League (IHL) in 1986, followed by four years as head coach of the IHL's Utah Grizzlies. After head coaching stints in the American Hockey League (AHL) for the Saint John Flames and Providence Bruins, Francis spent two years at the NHL level as an assistant coach to Pat Burns of the Boston Bruins before being hired by the Phoenix Coyotes in 1999. In 2002, after leading the Coyotes to a 40-27-9-6 record, and the most points in the league following that year's Olympic break, Francis was awarded the Jack Adams Award as Coach of the Year. Midway through his fifth season at the helm of the Coyotes in 2004, Francis was fired after a slow start and replaced by assistant coach Rick Bowness.

On April 26, 2006, Francis signed a two-year contract to coach HIFK in the Finnish SM-liiga. On December 19, 2006, Francis's contract was terminated.

== Personal life ==
Although Francis was born in North Battleford, Saskatchewan, he spent much of his youth growing up in Long Beach, New York, while his father was coaching the New York Rangers, and holds both Canadian and American citizenship. In September 2012, it was revealed that Francis had lost his balance and equilibrium and required a walker to get around. The symptoms began showing during the 2003–04 NHL season. Francis also revealed his struggle with alcoholism, which played a key factor in his dismissal from HIFK.

== Career statistics ==
=== Regular season and playoffs ===
			Regular season					Playoffs
Season	Team	League	GP	G	A	Pts	PIM	GP	G	A	Pts	PIM
1972–73	Brooklyn Stars	NYJHL	38	36	34	70	44	—	—	—	—	—
1973–74	Brooklyn Stars	NYJHL	41	41	53	94	63	12	17	11	28	24
1974–75	Bronx Shamrocks	NYJHL	40	53	59	112	71	—	—	—	—	—
1975–76	Great Bay Vikings	NEJHL	40	62	74	136	61	—	—	—	—	—
1976–77	University of New Hampshire	ECAC	13	2	7	9	12	—	—	—	—	—
1977–78	University of New Hampshire	ECAC	27	7	14	21	6	—	—	—	—	—
1978–79	University of New Hampshire	ECAC	35	20	46	66	44	—	—	—	—	—
1979–80	University of New Hampshire	ECAC	28	19	23	42	30	—	—	—	—	—
1980–81	Muskegon Mohawks	IHL	27	16	17	33	33	—	—	—	—	—
1980–81	Birmingham Bulls	CHL	18	6	21	27	20	—	—	—	—	—
1981–82	Oklahoma City Stars	CHL	80	48	66	114	76	4	1	2	3	11
1982–83	Colorado Flames	CHL	26	20	16	36	24	—	—	—	—	—
1982–83	Adirondack Red Wings	AHL	17	3	8	11	0	—	—	—	—	—
1982–83	Detroit Red Wings	NHL	14	2	0	2	0	—	—	—	—	—
1983–84	Colorado Flames	CHL	68	32	50	82	53	1	0	1	1	0
1984–85	Salt Lake Golden Eagles	IHL	53	24	16	40	36	6	1	1	2	0
1985–86	Salt Lake Golden Eagles	IHL	82	32	44	76	163	5	0	4	4	10
1986–87	Salt Lake Golden Eagles	IHL	82	29	69	98	86	17	9	8	17	13
IHL totals			244	101	146	247	318	28	10	13	23	23
NHL totals			14	2	0	2	0	—	—	—	—	—

=== NHL coaching ===
Team	Year	Regular season							Postseason		
Team	Year	G	W	L	T	OTL	Pts	Division rank	W	L	Result
Phoenix Coyotes	1999–00	82	39	31	8	4	90	3rd in Pacific	1	4	Lost in first round
Phoenix Coyotes	2000–01	82	35	27	17	3	90	4th in Pacific	—	—	Missed playoffs
Phoenix Coyotes	2001–02	82	40	27	9	6	95	2nd in Pacific	1	4	Lost in first round
Phoenix Coyotes	2002–03	82	31	35	11	5	78	4th in Pacific	—	—	Missed playoffs
Phoenix Coyotes	2003–04	62	20	24	15	3	55	5th in Pacific	—	—	Fired
NHL totals		390		165	144	60	21				

Preceded by Joe Mullen	Winner of the Phil Esposito Trophy; 1981–82	Succeeded by Wes Jarvis
Preceded by Joe Mullen	Winner of the Tommy Ivan Trophy; 1981–82	Succeeded by Kelly Hrudey
Preceded by Steve Kasper	Head coach of the Providence Bruins; 1995–97	Succeeded by Tom McVie
Preceded by Jim Schoenfeld	Head coach of the Phoenix Coyotes; 1999–2004	Succeeded by Rick Bowness
Preceded by Bill Barber	Winner of the Jack Adams Award; 2002	Succeeded by Jacques Lemaire
Preceded by Doug Shedden	HIFK head coach 2006	Succeeded by Paul Baxter
