= 1979–80 CHL season =

- League: Central Hockey League
- Sport: Ice hockey
- Number of teams: 9

Regular season
- Regular Season Top Team: Salt Lake Golden Eagles
- Season MVP: Doug Palazzari
- Top scorer: Doug Palazzari

Adams Cup playoffs
- Adams Cup playoffs MVP: Doug Grant

Adams Cup
- Champions: Salt Lake Golden Eagles
- Runners-up: Fort Worth Texans

CHL seasons
- ← 1978–79 1980–81 →

The 1979–80 CHL season was the 17th season of the Central Hockey League, a North American minor professional league. Nine teams participated in the regular season, and the Salt Lake Golden Eagles won the league title.

== Regular season ==
Central Hockey League	GP	W	L	OTL	GF	GA	Pts
Salt Lake Golden Eagles (STL)	80	49	24	7	342	259	105
Indianapolis Checkers (NYI)	79	40	32	7	275	238	87
Fort Worth Texans (COL)	80	37	34	9	312	298	83
Birmingham Bulls (ATL)	80	36	39	5	260	295	77
Tulsa Oilers (WPG)	80	34	37	9	241	256	77
Houston Apollos (EDM)	80	32	38	10	300	319	74
Oklahoma City Stars (MIN)	80	33	44	3	261	268	69
Dallas Black Hawks (VAN)	80	29	43	8	291	334	66
Cincinnati Stingers (HFD)	33	11	21	1	108	151	23

== Playoffs ==
=== First round ===
- (1) Salt Lake Golden Eagles – (6) Houston Apollos 4:2
- (2) Indianapolis Checkers – (5) Tulsa Oilers 3:0
- (3) Fort Worth Texans – (4) Birmingham Bulls 3:1

=== Second round ===
- (1) Bye for Salt Lake Golden Eagles
- (2) Indianapolis Checkers (3) – Fort Worth Texans 1:3

=== Final ===
- (1) Salt Lake Golden Eagles – (3) Fort Worth Texans 4:3
