= Wayne Schaab =

Canadian ice hockey player

- Born: December 3, 1948 (age 76); Penticton, British Columbia, Canada
- Height: 5 ft 10 in (178 cm)
- Weight: 170 lb (77 kg; 12 st 2 lb)
- Position: Centre
- Played for: AHL; Richmond Robins; Maine Mariners; CHL; Omaha Knights; EHL; Charlotte Checkers
- Playing career: 1970–1983

Wayne Schaab (born December 3, 1948) is a Canadian retired professional ice hockey player. While he never played in the NHL, he was a top point producer throughout the 1970s and early 1980s in the AHL with the Richmond Robins and Maine Mariners, the CHL with the Omaha Knights, and the EHL with the Charlotte Checkers.

Preceded by Lyle Moffat and Dan Gruen (tied)	CHL Leading Scorer; 1973–74; 1974–75	Succeeded by Jim Wiley
Preceded by Glenn Resch	Winner of the Tommy Ivan Trophy; 1974–75	Succeeded by Ian McKegney
