= Oklahoma City Blazers (1965–1977) =

- City: Oklahoma City, Oklahoma
- League: Central Professional Hockey League
- Founded: 1965
- Folded: 1977
- Home arena: Fairgrounds Arena; Myriad Convention Center
- Owner: Maple Leaf Gardens Limited
- Affiliates: Boston Bruins; Toronto Maple Leafs

The Oklahoma City Blazers were a professional ice hockey team that was based in Oklahoma City, Oklahoma. They competed in the Central Professional Hockey League from 1965 to 1977. The team played their home games in the Fairgrounds Arena, and later in The Myriad.

This team was created through the relocation of the Minneapolis Bruins, who began play in 1963 after originating as the Kingston Frontenacs of the defunct Eastern Professional Hockey League.

Initially they were a Boston Bruins farm team. The first coach was Harry Sinden, and NHL stars Bernie Parent, Gerry Cheevers, Doug Favell, Reggie Leach, Rick MacLeish, Wayne Cashman, Ivan Boldirev, J. P. Parise, Ross Lonsberry, Dallas Smith, Bill Goldsworthy and Jean Pronovost played for the Blazers. The Bruins withdrew from the team in 1972, but after a season without hockey, Maple Leaf Gardens Limited announced that they would relocate their Tulsa Oilers club of the CHL to become the reborn Oklahoma City Blazers, with Tulsa getting a replacement independent team. From 1973 to 1976 the team was affiliated with the Toronto Maple Leafs and their roster included Mike Palmateer, Blaine Stoughton, Pat Boutette and all-time NHL penalty leader Dave "Tiger" Williams. Prior to the 1976–77 season the Maple Leafs decided to share the Dallas Black Hawks of the CHL with the Chicago Black Hawks as their affiliate, in an attempt to reduce costs.

Gregg Sheppard was the franchise's leading career scorer. Their home arenas were the Fairgrounds Arena and the Myriad Convention Center. The Blazers won the CHL championship in 1966 under player-coach Harry Sinden and repeated in 1967.

John Brooks, sports director of the local CBS TV affiliate KWTV Channel 9 and radio play-by-play voice for high-profile University of Oklahoma football and men's basketball from 1978 to 1992, was the on-air voice of the original Blazers in the 1960s and 1970s. His catch phrase for Blazers same-day game radio ads was "Let's play hockey... TONIGHT!"

== Seasons ==
Key of colors and symbols
Color/symbol	Explanation
†	CHL champions
↑	Division champions
#	Led league in points

Year-by-year listing of Oklahoma City Blazers seasons
CHL season	Division	Regular season									Postseason					
CHL season	Division	Finish	GP	W	L	T	OT	Pts	GF	GA	GP	W	L	GF	GA	Result
1965–66†	–	2nd	70	31	26	13	–	75	188	203	Won semifinals vs. St. Louis Braves, 1–4; Won Adams Cup vs. Tulsa Oilers, 4–0					
1966–67†	–	1st	70	38	23	9	–	85#	233	196	Won semifinals vs. Houston Apollos, 4–2; Won Adams Cup vs. Omaha Knights, 4–1					
1967–68	Southern^{↑}	1st	70	38	20	12	–	88#	245	174	Lost first round vs. Tulsa Oilers, 3–4					
1968–69	South^{↑}	1st	72	40	19	13	–	93#	295	225	Won semifinals vs. Tulsa Oilers, 4–3; Lost Adams Cup vs. Dallas Black Hawks, 1–4					
1969–70	South	6th	72	26	39	7	–	59	233	291	Did not qualify					
1970–71	–	4th	72	30	31	11	–	72	258	273	Lost semifinals vs. Omaha Knights, 1–4					
1971–72	–	4th	72	29	34	9	–	67	235	273	Lost semifinals vs. Dallas Black Hawks, 2–4					
1972–73	Did not participate															
1973–74	–	2nd	72	36	25	11	–	83	280	230	Won semifinals vs. Fort Worth Wings, 4–1; Lost Adams Cup vs. Dallas Black Hawks, 1–4					
1974–75	Southern	2nd	78	33	33	12	–	78	267	267	Won Division seminfinal vs. Tulsa Oilers, 2–0; Lost Division Final vs. Dallas Black Hawks, 0–3					
1975–76	–	4th	76	32	34	10	–	74	256	263	Lost semifinals vs. Tulsa Oilers, 0–4					
1976–77	–	6th	76	15	53	8	–	38	245	416	Did not qualify					
