= 1978–79 CHL season =

- League: Central Hockey League
- Sport: Ice hockey
- Number of teams: 6

Regular season
- Regular Season Top Team: Salt Lake Golden Eagles
- Season MVP: Ron Low
- Top scorer: Rick Shinske

Adams Cup playoffs
- Adams Cup playoffs MVP: Curt Ridley

Adams Cup
- Champions: Dallas Black Hawks
- Runners-up: Salt Lake Golden Eagles

CHL seasons
- ← 1977–78 1979–80 →

The 1978–79 CHL season was the 16th season of the Central Hockey League, a North American minor professional league. Six teams participated in the regular season, and the Dallas Black Hawks won the league title.

== Regular season ==
Central Hockey League	GP	W	L	OTL	GF	GA	Pts
Salt Lake Golden Eagles (STL)	76	47	22	7	314	209	101
Dallas Black Hawks (VAN)	76	45	28	3	339	289	93
Kansas City Red Wings (DET)	76	37	36	3	301	306	77
Fort Worth Texans (NYI)	76	33	39	4	260	277	70
Oklahoma City Stars (MIN)	76	34	41	1	277	311	69
Tulsa Oilers (ATL)	76	21	51	4	258	357	46

== Playoffs ==
Semifinals
1	Salt Lake Golden Eagles	4
4	Fort Worth Texans	1
2	Dallas Black Hawks	4
3	Kansas City Red Wings	0

Final
1	Salt Lake Golden Eagles	1
2	Dallas Black Hawks	4
