= 1971–72 CHL season =

American ice hockey season

The 1971–72 CHL season was the ninth season of the Central Hockey League, a North American minor professional league. Six teams participated in the regular season, and the Dallas Black Hawks won the league title.

== Regular season ==
Central Hockey League	GP	W	L	OTL	GF	GA	Pts
Dallas Black Hawks	72	43	22	7	317	232	93
Tulsa Oilers	72	34	30	8	256	243	76
Fort Worth Wings	72	30	30	12	238	246	72
Oklahoma City Blazers	72	29	34	9	235	273	67
Omaha Knights	72	29	35	8	241	260	66
Kansas City Blues	72	21	35	16	244	277	58

== Playoffs ==
Semifinals
1	Dallas Black Hawks	4
4	Oklahoma City Blazers	2
2	Tulsa Oilers	4
3	Fort Worth Wings	3

Final
1	Dallas Black Hawks	4
2	Tulsa Oilers	2
