= 1977–78 CHL season =

- League: Central Hockey League
- Sport: Ice hockey
- Teams: 6

Regular season
- Regular Season Top Team: Fort Worth Texans
- Season MVP: Doug Palazzari
- Top scorer: Doug Palazzari

Adams Cup playoffs
- Adams Cup playoffs MVP: John Anderson

Adams Cup
- Champions: Fort Worth Texans
- Runners-up: Dallas Black Hawks

CHL seasons
- 1976–77 1978–1979

The 1977–78 CHL season was the 15th season of the Central Hockey League, a North American minor professional league. Six teams participated in the regular season, and the Fort Worth Texans won the league title.

== Regular season ==
Central Hockey League	GP	W	L	OTL	GF	GA	Pts
Fort Worth Texans (NYI/MIN)	76	44	29	3	262	251	91
Salt Lake Golden Eagles (STL)	76	42	31	3	283	238	87
Dallas Black Hawks (CHI/TOR)	77	38	36	3	284	281	79
Tulsa Oilers (VAN/ATL)	76	34	39	3	264	273	71
Kansas City Red Wings (DET)	76	33	40	3	266	257	69
Phoenix Roadrunners (COL/CLE)	27	4	20	3	75	134	11

== Playoffs ==
Semifinals
1	Fort Worth Texans	4
4	Tulsa Oilers	3
2	Salt Lake Golden Eagles	2
3	Dallas Black Hawks	4

Final
1	Fort Worth Texans	4
3	Dallas Black Hawks	3
