= Chico Resch =

Canadian-American ice hockey player

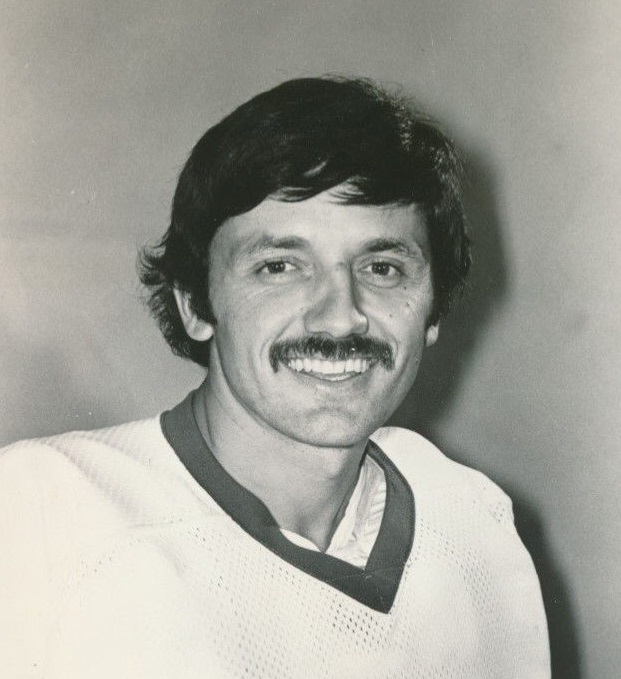
- Resch with the New York Islanders in 1978
- Born: July 10, 1948 (age 78) Moose Jaw, Saskatchewan, Canada
- Height: 5 ft 9 in (175 cm)
- Weight: 195 lb (88 kg; 13 st 13 lb)
- Position: Goaltender
- Caught: Left
- Played for: New York Islanders; Colorado Rockies; New Jersey Devils; Philadelphia Flyers
- National team: Canada and United States
- NHL draft: Undrafted
- Playing career: 1971–1987

Glenn Allan "Chico" Resch (born July 10, 1948) is a Canadian-American former professional ice hockey player and television sportscaster. He played as a goaltender in the National Hockey League (NHL) from 1973 to 1987, and won a Stanley Cup with the New York Islanders in 1979–80. He has served as the color commentator for telecasts of New Jersey Devils games on MSG Network and MSG Plus.

== Playing career ==
=== Junior and minor pro hockey ===
Resch started his playing career as goalie for the University of Minnesota Duluth Bulldogs. After earning a degree in education, he turned pro with the Muskegon Mohawks of the IHL where he won three awards in his first season: the James Norris Memorial Trophy for the fewest goals allowed, rookie of the year honours, and selection to the First All-Star team.

The following year he graduated to the New Haven Nighthawks of the American Hockey League and then spent most of the 1973–74 season with the Fort Worth Wings of the CHL, where he won the league's MVP Honours and was voted a First Team All Star. He made his NHL debut with the New York Islanders on February 3, 1974, in a 4–2 loss to the California Golden Seals and earned his first NHL victory two nights later, with a 6–2 win over the Minnesota North Stars, before returning to the Wings for the remainder of the season.

=== New York Islanders ===
The next season, 1974–75 was Resch's first full year in the NHL. In 25 games, he had twelve wins, seven losses, and five ties, with three shut-outs and a 2.47 goals against average. He did well in the playoffs too, earning eight wins, four losses and a 2.17 goals against average. Resch was in goal as the Islanders overcame 3–0 deficits against the Pittsburgh Penguins and Philadelphia Flyers. The Islanders defeated the Penguins in seven games, winning the decisive game 1–0 on a goal by team captain Ed Westfall. The comeback is considered one of the greatest in sports history and is one of only five times in history that a North American professional sports team won a best-of-seven series after losing the first three games (the others were the 1941–42 Toronto Maple Leafs, the 2004 Boston Red Sox (Major League Baseball), the 2009–10 Philadelphia Flyers, and the 2013–14 Los Angeles Kings). In the following round, the Islanders again rallied from a 3–0 deficit to force a game seven, but the Flyers eliminated the Islanders with a 4–1 win in the deciding game.

In 1975–76, Resch played 44 games and earned 23 wins, 11 losses, eight ties, seven shut-outs and a 2.07 goals against average resulting in his being selected to the Second All-Star team by season's end. Over the next few seasons, he shared the goaltending duties with another promising young goalie, Billy Smith. In 1978–79, Resch and Smith backstopped the Islanders to the best regular season record in the league, and Resch earned Second All-Star team honours again. However, the team was beaten by the New York Rangers in the Stanley Cup semifinals.

In 1979–80, his sixth full season with the Islanders, Resch served as the backup through most of the team's successful playoff run to the Stanley Cup. He was one of the key players from the Islanders' 1979 first place team who left the team or had their roles diminished; before the end of the season, General Manager Bill Torrey had traded away longtime and popular veterans Billy Harris and Dave Lewis to the Los Angeles Kings in return for Butch Goring.

=== Colorado Rockies/New Jersey Devils ===
The next season, on March 10, 1981, Resch was traded to the struggling Colorado Rockies along with Steve Tambellini for Mike McEwen and Jari Kaarela. He returned to Long Island for the first time as an opponent on February 20, 1982. The Islanders defeated the Rockies 3–2 on a goal in the final minute by John Tonelli. The victory was the Islanders' 15th straight, which set an NHL record at the time. Resch played in Colorado for the rest of the 1980–81 season and the 1981–82 season before the franchise moved to New Jersey to become the New Jersey Devils. Resch shouldered a heavy load over the next few years, but the Devils did not win many games.

=== Philadelphia Flyers ===
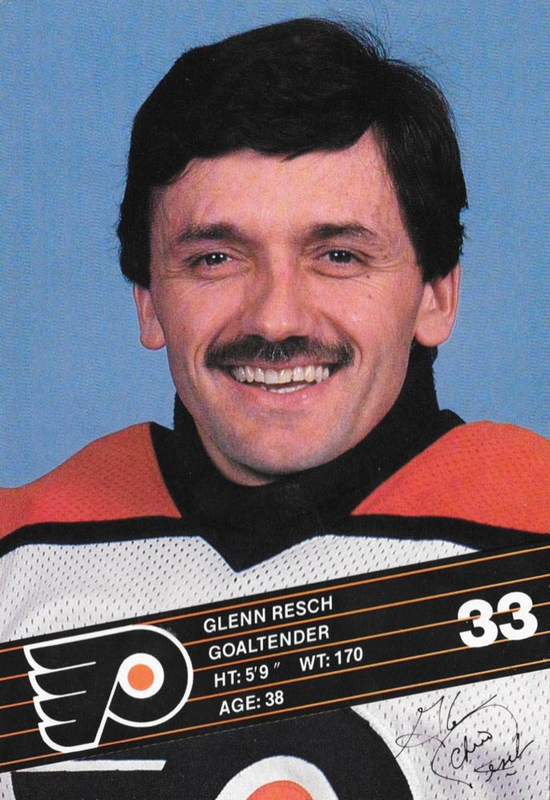
Resch with the Philadelphia Flyers in 1986

Resch was traded to the Philadelphia Flyers on March 11, 1986, for a third-round pick in the 1986 NHL entry draft (used to select Marc Laniel). He served as a backup to rookie sensation Ron Hextall in 1986–87. Resch did not play in the 1987 playoffs, when the Flyers defeated his old team, the New York Islanders, in seven games in the second round. In the pre-game warm-up of game six of the conference finals with the Montreal Canadiens, Resch was ejected from one of the games for his part in starting a pre-game brawl with Montreal's Claude Lemieux. The Flyers won that series but lost to the Edmonton Oilers in seven games in the 1987 Stanley Cup Final. In 1986–87 he went 6–5–2 in 17 games, his first winning season since he left the Islanders. When he retired in 1987, he was the last active player who had been born in the 1940s.

== International play ==
Resch is the only goaltender to represent two different countries at Canada Cup. In 1976, he was a member of the Canadian team, whereas in 1984 he represented the United States as he attained U.S. citizenship after marrying an American and being a legal resident for many years. In 1981, he turned down Don Cherry's offer to represent Canada at the 1981 World Ice Hockey Championships in Sweden, and represented the U.S. at the same tournament the following year in Finland.

== Broadcasting career ==
Resch became a television commentator starting during his playing days, often working as an analyst for the Canadian Broadcasting Corporation's Hockey Night in Canada in the playoffs after his team had been eliminated from Stanley Cup contention.

After retiring as a player, he worked as a color commentator on the Minnesota North Stars' television broadcasts during the 1987–88 and 1988–89 seasons.

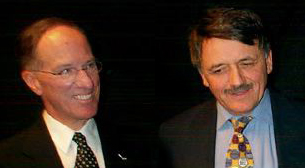
"Doc" and "Chico"

After working as a general manager for a Canadian junior hockey team and as a professional coach, mainly for the Ottawa Senators, Resch served for fifteen years on Fox Sports New York (later renamed MSG Plus) as a commentator on New Jersey Devils games with announcer Mike Emrick. After Emrick left to work for NBC exclusively, Resch spent the next three years paired with Steve Cangialosi. Shortly before the end of the 2013–14 season, Resch announced that he would be leaving the Devils crew and moving to Minnesota at the wish of his wife. He called his last Devils game on April 13, 2014. On October 5, 2017, the New Jersey Devils announced that Resch would be joining their radio broadcast team as the color commentator alongside play-by-play announcer Matt Loughlin.

== Personal life ==
Resch resides in Lyndhurst, New Jersey during the NHL season and in Brainerd, Minnesota and Emily, Minnesota in the off-season. During his playing career with the Devils he lived in Little Ferry and Ridgewood, New Jersey. Resch and his wife chose Lyndhurst for its small-town feel, public transportation access and proximity to both Manhattan and Newark, where the Devils play their home games. His daughter Holly, is an artist and she illustrated of one of Resch's books, Tales from the Devils Ice. A passionate Christian, Resch is one of the supporters and coaches for Hockey Ministries International in the off-season, where he teaches young boys and girls hockey and ethic skills at Christian Hockey Camps.

Resch was given the nickname "Chico" by the Islanders' teammate Doug Rombough, after the character portrayed by Freddie Prinze on the 1970s sit-com Chico and the Man. Chants of "Let's go, Chico!" rang out at every Devils' game when he played. In the early 2000s, the same nickname was given to the Phoenix Coyotes' goaltender Robert Esche, whose sticks were labeled 'R.ESCHE', which resembled "RESCH".

== Awards and honors ==
| Award | Year | Ref |
|---|---|---|
| All-WCHA Second Team | 1970–71 | |
| Stanley Cup champion | 1979–80 | |
| Bill Masterton Trophy | 1981–82 | |

Resch played in the NHL All-Star game in 1976, 1977, and 1984; in the 1984 game he was the winning goaltender for the Wales Conference. Also, he was named to the Postseason Second All-Star team in 1976 and 1979.

== Career statistics ==
=== Regular season and playoffs ===
| | | | Regular season | | | | | | | | | Playoffs |
| Season | Team | League | GP | W | L | T | MIN | GA | SO | GAA | SV% | GP | W | L | MIN | GA | SO | GAA | SV% |
|---|---|---|---|---|---|---|---|---|---|---|---|---|---|---|---|---|---|---|---|
| 1966–67 | Regina Pats | SJHL | 5 | — | — | — | 300 | 17 | 0 | 3.40 | — | 6 | 2 | 4 | 360 | 26 | 0 | 4.33 | — |
| 1967–68 | Minnesota-Duluth Bulldogs | WCHA | — | — | — | — | — | — | — | — | — | — | — | — | — | — | — | — | — |
| 1968–69 | Minnesota-Duluth Bulldogs | WCHA | 24 | 5 | 19 | 0 | 1,424 | 117 | 0 | 4.93 | — | — | — | — | — | — | — | — | — |
| 1969–70 | Minnesota-Duluth Bulldogs | WCHA | 25 | 12 | 12 | 1 | 1,500 | 97 | 1 | 3.88 | — | — | — | — | — | — | — | — | — |
| 1970–71 | Minnesota-Duluth Bulldogs | WCHA | 26 | 11 | 14 | 1 | 1,518 | 107 | 0 | 4.23 | — | — | — | — | — | — | — | — | — |
| 1971–72 | Muskegon Mohawks | IHL | 59 | — | — | — | 3,488 | 180 | 4 | 3.09 | — | 11 | — | — | 617 | 29 | 0 | 2.82 | — |
| 1972–73 | New Haven Nighthawks | AHL | 43 | — | — | — | 2,408 | 166 | 0 | 4.13 | — | — | — | — | — | — | — | — | — |
| 1973–74 | New York Islanders | NHL | 2 | 1 | 1 | 0 | 120 | 6 | 0 | 3.00 | .895 | — | — | — | — | — | — | — | — |
| 1973–74 | Fort Worth Wings | CHL | 55 | 24 | 20 | 11 | 3,300 | 175 | 2 | 3.18 | — | 5 | 1 | 4 | 300 | 21 | 0 | 3.60 | — |
| 1974–75 | New York Islanders | NHL | 25 | 12 | 7 | 5 | 1,432 | 59 | 3 | 2.47 | .915 | 12 | 8 | 4 | 692 | 25 | 1 | 2.17 | .931 |
| 1975–76 | New York Islanders | NHL | 44 | 23 | 11 | 8 | 2,546 | 88 | 7 | 2.07 | .928 | 7 | 3 | 3 | 357 | 18 | 0 | 3.03 | .907 |
| 1976–77 | New York Islanders | NHL | 46 | 26 | 13 | 6 | 2,711 | 103 | 4 | 2.28 | .917 | 3 | 1 | 1 | 144 | 5 | 0 | 2.08 | .917 |
| 1977–78 | New York Islanders | NHL | 45 | 29 | 8 | 7 | 2,637 | 112 | 3 | 2.55 | .907 | 7 | 3 | 4 | 388 | 15 | 0 | 2.32 | .916 |
| 1978–79 | New York Islanders | NHL | 43 | 26 | 7 | 10 | 2,539 | 106 | 2 | 2.50 | .913 | 5 | 2 | 3 | 300 | 11 | 1 | 2.20 | .923 |
| 1979–80 | New York Islanders | NHL | 45 | 23 | 14 | 6 | 2,606 | 132 | 3 | 3.04 | .901 | 4 | 0 | 2 | 120 | 9 | 0 | 4.50 | .791 |
| 1980–81 | New York Islanders | NHL | 32 | 18 | 7 | 5 | 1,817 | 93 | 3 | 3.07 | .894 | — | — | — | — | — | — | — | — |
| 1980–81 | Colorado Rockies | NHL | 8 | 2 | 4 | 2 | 449 | 28 | 0 | 3.74 | .877 | — | — | — | — | — | — | — | — |
| 1981–82 | Colorado Rockies | NHL | 61 | 16 | 31 | 11 | 3,424 | 230 | 0 | 4.03 | .878 | — | — | — | — | — | — | — | — |
| 1982–83 | New Jersey Devils | NHL | 65 | 15 | 35 | 12 | 3,650 | 242 | 0 | 3.98 | .875 | — | — | — | — | — | — | — | — |
| 1983–84 | New Jersey Devils | NHL | 51 | 9 | 31 | 3 | 2,641 | 184 | 1 | 4.18 | .871 | — | — | — | — | — | — | — | — |
| 1984–85 | New Jersey Devils | NHL | 51 | 15 | 27 | 5 | 2,884 | 200 | 0 | 4.16 | .857 | — | — | — | — | — | — | — | — |
| 1985–86 | New Jersey Devils | NHL | 31 | 10 | 20 | 0 | 1,769 | 126 | 0 | 4.27 | .858 | — | — | — | — | — | — | — | — |
| 1985–86 | Philadelphia Flyers | NHL | 5 | 1 | 2 | 0 | 187 | 10 | 0 | 3.21 | .881 | 1 | 0 | 0 | 7 | 1 | 0 | 8.57 | .000 |
| 1986–87 | Philadelphia Flyers | NHL | 17 | 6 | 5 | 2 | 867 | 42 | 0 | 2.91 | .904 | 2 | 0 | 0 | 36 | 1 | 0 | 1.67 | .917 |
| NHL totals | | | 571 | 231 | 224 | 82 | 32,279 | 1,761 | 26 | 3.27 | .891 | 41 | 17 | 17 | 2,044 | 85 | 2 | 2.50 | .914 |

=== International ===
| Year | Team | Event | GP | W | L | T | MIN | GA | SO | GAA |
|---|---|---|---|---|---|---|---|---|---|---|
| 1976 | Canada | CC | DNP | — | — | — | — | — | — | — |
| 1982 | United States | WC | 4 | 0 | 4 | 0 | 239 | 21 | 0 | 5.27 |
| 1984 | United States | CC | 2 | 0 | 1 | 1 | 108 | 9 | 0 | 5.00 |
| Senior totals | | | 6 | 0 | 5 | 1 | 347 | 30 | 0 | 5.19 |

"Resch's stats". The Goaltender Home Page.

| Preceded by Mike Cormier | CHL Most Valuable Player Award; 1973–74 | Succeeded by Wayne Schaab |
| Preceded by Blake Dunlop | Winner of the Bill Masterton Memorial Trophy; 1982 | Succeeded by Lanny McDonald |
