= Michel Cormier (ice hockey) =

Canadian ice hockey player

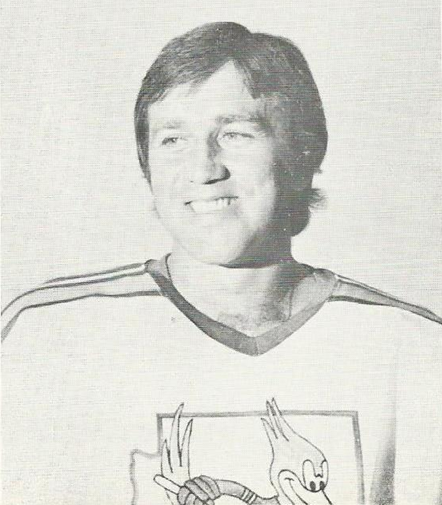
- Born: December 22, 1945 (age 80) Trois-Rivières, Quebec, Canada
- Height: 5 ft 9 in (175 cm)
- Weight: 170 lb (77 kg; 12 st 2 lb)
- Position: Left wing
- Shot: Left
- Played for: Phoenix Roadrunners
- Playing career: 1966–1979

Michel Cormier (born December 22, 1945) is a Canadian former professional ice hockey winger who played 182 games in the World Hockey Association. He played with the Phoenix Roadrunners.

== Career statistics ==
=== Regular season and playoffs ===
			Regular season					Playoffs
Season	Team	League	GP	G	A	Pts	PIM	GP	G	A	Pts	PIM
1961–62	Trois—Rivieres Reds	QPJHL	1	0	0	0	0	—	—	—	—	—
1964–65	Trois—Rivieres Reds	QJAHL	40	35	37	72	0	—	—	—	—	—
1965–66	Trois—Rivieres Reds	QJAHL	——	47	40	87	0	—	—	—	—	—
1966–67	Tulsa Oilers	CPHL	4	0	1	1	0	—	—	—	—	—
1966–67	Florida—Charlotte	EHL	21	1	7	8	4	—	—	—	—	—
1967–68	Tulsa Oilers	CPHL	3	0	1	1	2	—	—	—	—	—
1971–72	Denver Spurs	WHL	5	0	1	1	2	—	—	—	—	—
1972–73	Fort Worth Wings	CHL	72	35	38	73	24	4	0	1	1	0
1972–73	Denver Spurs	WHL	1	0	0	0	0	—	—	—	—	—
1973–74	Phoenix Roadrunners	WHL	63	16	31	47	29	7	4	3	7	4
1973–74	Tulsa Oilers	CHL	7	2	5	7	2	—	—	—	—	—
1974–75	Phoenix Roadrunners	WHA	78	36	38	74	26	5	1	0	1	2
1975–76	Phoenix Roadrunners	WHA	46	21	15	36	4	—	—	—	—	—
1976–77	Phoenix Roadrunners	WHA	58	13	16	29	22	—	—	—	—	—
1978–79	Phoenix Roadrunners	PHL	44	15	25	40	16	—	—	—	—	—
WHA totals			23	5	7	12	4	—	—	—	—	—

Preceded by Gregg Sheppard	CHL Most Valuable Player Award; 1972–73	Succeeded by Glenn Resch
