= Cincinnati Tigers (ice hockey) =

- City: Cincinnati, Ohio
- League: Central Hockey League
- Operated: 1981-82
- Home arena: Riverfront Coliseum
- Colors: Black with blue, gold and white trim
- Owner: Maple Leaf Gardens Limited
- Affiliates: Toronto Maple Leafs

The Cincinnati Tigers were a minor league ice hockey team in the Central Hockey League during the 1981–82 season. They played in Cincinnati, Ohio, at the Riverfront Coliseum. The team was owned and operated by Maple Leaf Gardens Limited, and served as a farm team for the Toronto Maple Leafs.

Prior to launching the Tigers, the Leafs were affiliated with the New Brunswick Hawks of the American Hockey League (AHL), which they shared with the Chicago Black Hawks. However, Harold Ballard, owner of the Leafs, decided that they needed a developmental team of their own, with a spokesperson citing the limited number of roster spots as the rationale for the move.

The team averaged only 1,500 fans and lost $750,000 in their first season, leading the Leafs to dissolve the Tigers in the spring of 1982. Shortly thereafter, with Chicago having pulled out of New Brunswick in favour of affiliating with the Springfield Indians on their own, the Leafs relocated the New Brunswick Hawks to St. Catharines, Ontario to establish the St. Catharines Saints as their farm team.

== Regular season ==
Season	Games	Won	Lost	Tied	Points	GF	GA	Standing
1981-82	80	46	30	4	96	375	340	2nd, North

== Playoffs ==
Season	Division Semifinals	Division Finals	Adams Cup Finals
1981-82	L, 1–3, Dallas Black Hawks	—	—
