= 1967–68 CPHL season =

American ice hockey season

The 1967–68 Central Professional Hockey League season was the fifth season of the Central Professional Hockey League, a North American minor pro league. Eight teams participated in the regular season, and the Tulsa Oilers won the league title.

== Regular season ==
| Northern Division | GP | W | L | OTL | GF | GA | Pts |
|---|---|---|---|---|---|---|---|
| Tulsa Oilers | 70 | 37 | 22 | 11 | 278 | 241 | 85 |
| Kansas City Blues | 70 | 31 | 29 | 10 | 249 | 243 | 72 |
| Memphis South Stars | 70 | 24 | 34 | 12 | 206 | 244 | 60 |
| Omaha Knights | 70 | 14 | 46 | 10 | 167 | 272 | 38 |

| Southern Division | GP | W | L | OTL | GF | GA | Pts |
|---|---|---|---|---|---|---|---|
| Oklahoma City Blazers | 70 | 38 | 20 | 12 | 245 | 174 | 88 |
| Fort Worth Wings | 70 | 34 | 25 | 11 | 245 | 199 | 79 |
| Dallas Black Hawks | 70 | 30 | 29 | 11 | 230 | 251 | 71 |
| Houston Apollos | 70 | 28 | 31 | 11 | 220 | 216 | 67 |

== Playoffs ==
=== First round ===
- (N1) Tulsa Oilers - (S1) Oklahoma City Blazers 4:3
- (N2) Kansas City Blues - (N3) Memphis South Stars 3:0
- (S2) Fort Worth Wings - (S3) Dallas Black Hawks 3:2

=== Second round ===
- (N1) Tulsa Oilers - bye
- (S2) Fort Worth Wings - (N2) Kansas City Blues 3:1

=== Final ===
- (N1) Tulsa Oilers - (S2) Fort Worth Wings 4:0
