= Max McNab Trophy =

The Max McNab Trophy was awarded annually to the Central Hockey League (CHL) player selected as the most valuable player in the Adams Cup playoffs.

Named in honour of the former CHL president Max McNab commencing with 1976–77 CHL season.

== Winners ==
Year	Player	Team
1983-84	Grant Ledyard	Tulsa Oilers
1982-83	Bruce Affleck	Indianapolis Checkers
1981-82	Kelly Hrudey	Indianapolis Checkers
1980-81	Don Murdoch	Wichita Wind
1979-80	Doug Grant	Salt Lake Golden Eagles
1978-79	Curt Ridley	Dallas Black Hawks
1977-78	John Anderson	Dallas Black Hawks
1976-77	Bill McKenzie	Kansas City Blues
