= 1965–66 CPHL season =

American ice hockey season

The 1965–66 Central Professional Hockey League season was the third season of the Central Professional Hockey League, a North American minor pro league. Six teams participated in the regular season, and the Oklahoma City Blazers won the league title.

== Regular season ==
Central Professional Hockey League	GP	W	L	OTL	GF	GA	Pts
Minnesota Rangers	70	34	25	11	229	197	79
Oklahoma City Blazers	70	31	26	13	188	203	75
Tulsa Oilers	70	29	29	12	218	198	70
St. Louis Braves	70	30	31	9	226	217	69
Houston Apollos	70	27	32	11	221	244	65
Memphis Wings	70	25	33	12	200	223	62

== Playoffs ==
Semifinals
2	Oklahoma City Blazers	4
4	St. Louis Braves	1
1	Minnesota Rangers	3
3	Tulsa Oilers	4

Final
2	Oklahoma City Blazers	4
3	Tulsa Oilers	0
