= Wichita Wind =

- City: Wichita, Kansas
- League: Central Hockey League
- Founded: 1980
- Folded: 1983
- Home arena: Kansas Coliseum
- Colors: Blue, white, and orange
- Affiliates: Edmonton Oilers; New Jersey Devils

The Wichita Wind were a minor league ice hockey team based in Wichita, Kansas from 1980 to 1983. They were the feeder team of the Edmonton Oilers (1980–81 and 1981–82 seasons) and the New Jersey Devils (1982–83). The Wind played in the Central Hockey League (CHL) at the Britt Brown Arena in the Kansas Coliseum. The team's general manager (GM) was Larry Gordon for all three seasons of existence.

In June 1980, Gordon was replaced as Oilers' GM and took over as president, owner, and GM of the Wind. The team name was picked from 6,600 entries in a name-the-team contest, and the team's mascot was an orange tornado. Roy Sommer, who went on to become coach of the San Jose Barracuda, was the captain all three seasons of the Wind's existence.

== Seasons ==
The Wind was decimated by injuries in their inaugural season. In a game against the Dallas Black Hawks on December 27, 1980, they dressed coach Garnet Bailey as a defenseman and a public relations employee as the backup goaltender; they lost the game 6–3. Bailey was described by Tom Roulston as "just like a big kid", who also said that many practices consisted of half-ice scrimmages and shootouts. The team played to sixth place at 32 wins, 45 losses, and 3 ties in the regular season, also gaining the most penalty minutes. Bailey's club won its first playoff series against the Indianapolis Checkers in the decisive fifth game 6–5 on a goal by Tom Roulston, the league's leading scorer. The Wind won the following series 4–2 against the Dallas Black Hawks, who led the regular-season standings. The Wind lost in seven games to the reigning champions, the Salt Lake Golden Eagles, in the Adams Cup championship series. Don Murdoch was named playoff MVP after accumulating 17 goals and 7 assists over 18 games, a CHL playoff record for points. After the season, center Don Ashby, the Wind's second-leading scorer, died in a car crash.

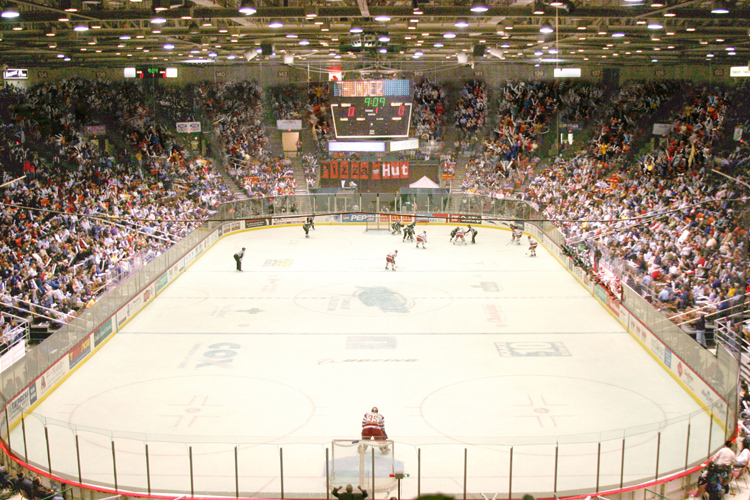
In 1983, GM Gordon took the team out of Wichita following disagreements over the leasing of Britt Brown Arena, seen here during a Wichita Thunder's game.

The Wind, now coached by John Muckler, concluded the 1981–82 pre-season with a 5–4 loss to the Golden Eagles. A good checking team but lacking in offensive power, only four Wichita players averaged over one point per game. Following a game in which the team received 19 fighting penalties, Muckler and eight other members of the organization spent a night in jail for a nightclub altercation. The owner of a disco club asked police to remove the players from his property; Muckler said police "panicked" and "didn't handle the situation very professionally". After winning twice and tying once in their last three games, the Wind finished the regular season 44–33–3, first in the league's South division. In the first round of the playoffs, the Wind swept three games from the Nashville South Stars; 1981–82 was their only season in the CHL. In the following round, Wichita was dismissed by the Checkers after losing four consecutive games.

In August 1982, Muckler was named assistant coach of the Oilers and replaced by Andy Laing. Additionally, the New Jersey Devils replaced the Oilers as the Wind's parent team. The Wind missed the playoffs for the first time, finishing in sixth place with a 29–48–3. They were eliminated from playoff contention early in the season. It was announced after the season that the team would not play in Wichita a fourth year because of conflicts over the lease on the Kansas Coliseum. The Coliseum's owners wanted a two-year commitment while GM Gordon wanted a one-year lease. Additionally, the team lacked a practice facility; Gordon said the team "bent over backward to keep hockey in Wichita". A preliminary agreement was reached to move the team to Yellowstone METRA (now Rimrock Auto Arena) in Billings, Montana, where they later became the Montana Magic during the 1983-84 season.

== Notable NHL/WHA alumni ==
List of Wichita Wind alumni who played more than 100 games in Wichita and 100 or more games in the National Hockey League or the World Hockey Association.

- Peter Driscoll
- Walt Poddubny
