= 1966–67 CPHL season =

American ice hockey season

The 1966–67 Central Professional Hockey League season was the fourth season of the Central Professional Hockey League, a North American minor pro league. Six teams participated in the regular season, and the Oklahoma City Blazers won the league title.

== Regular season ==
| Central Professional Hockey League | GP | W | L | OTL | GF | GA | Pts |
|---|---|---|---|---|---|---|---|
| Oklahoma City Blazers | 70 | 38 | 23 | 9 | 233 | 196 | 85 |
| Omaha Knights | 70 | 36 | 24 | 10 | 262 | 203 | 82 |
| Houston Apollos | 70 | 32 | 28 | 10 | 255 | 229 | 74 |
| Memphis Wings | 70 | 30 | 32 | 8 | 230 | 259 | 68 |
| St. Louis Braves | 70 | 24 | 26 | 20 | 229 | 236 | 68 |
| Tulsa Oilers | 70 | 14 | 41 | 15 | 183 | 269 | 43 |

== Playoffs ==
Semifinals
1 | Oklahoma City Blazers | 4
3 | Houston Apollos | 2
2 | Omaha Knights | 4
4 | Memphis Wings | 3

Final
1 | Oklahoma City Blazers | 4
2 | Omaha Knights | 1
