= 1975–76 CHL season =

American ice hockey season

The 1975–76 CHL season was the 13th season of the Central Hockey League, a North American minor professional league. Six teams participated in the regular season, and the Tulsa Oilers won the league title.

== Regular season ==
Central Hockey League	GP	W	L	OTL	GF	GA	Pts
Tulsa Oilers (VAN/ATL)	76	45	21	10	301	228	100
Dallas Black Hawks (CHI)	76	41	24	11	282	211	93
Salt Lake Golden Eagles (CAL)	76	37	35	4	300	299	78
Oklahoma City Blazers (TOR)	76	32	34	10	256	263	74
Fort Worth Texans (NYI/LA)	76	29	31	16	287	271	74
Tucson Mavericks	76	14	53	9	242	396	37

== Playoffs ==
Semifinals
1	Tulsa Oilers	4
4	Oklahoma City Blazers	0
2	Dallas Black Hawks	4
3	Salt Lake Golden Eagles	1

Final
1	Tulsa Oilers	4
2	Dallas Black Hawks	1
