= Omaha Knights (1966–1975) =

- City: Omaha, Nebraska
- League: Central Hockey League
- Operated: 1966–1975
- Home arena: Ak-Sar-Ben Arena
- Affiliates: Atlanta Flames

Franchise history
- 1963–1965: St. Paul Rangers
- 1965–1966: Minnesota Rangers
- 1966–1975: Omaha Knights

Championships
- Regular season titles: 1969–70, 1970–71, 1972–73, 1973–74
- Playoff championships: 1970, 1971, 1973

The Omaha Knights were a minor professional ice hockey team in Omaha, Nebraska. The franchise was founded in 1963 as the St. Paul Rangers and played for three seasons in Minnesota. After the NHL announced that it would place a new franchise in the region, the then-Minnesota Rangers moved to Omaha, taking up the same residence as several former professional teams. To curry favor with the fanbase and honor the past, the team took on the moniker of the previous three franchises and was the fourth to bear the name 'Omaha Knights'. This squad was the most successful of the bunch, lasting for nine seasons and winning three league championships.

== Season-by-season records ==
Season	GP	W	L	T	Pts	GF	GA	Place	Playoffs
1966–67	70	36	24	10	82	262	203	2nd	Runner Up
1967–68	70	14	46	10	38	167	272	4th in North	Missed
1968–69	72	29	32	11	69	247	250	3rd in North	Semifinals
1969–70	72	36	26	10	82	247	212	1st	Champions
1970–71	72	45	16	11	101	312	216	1st	Champions
1971–72	72	29	35	8	66	241	260	5th	Missed
1972–73	72	35	27	10	80	262	263	2nd	Champions
1973–74	72	34	23	15	83	259	217	1st	Semifinals
1974–75	78	34	33	11	79	254	268	3rd in North	Semifinals
Totals	142	81	44	17	–	557	456	–	–
