= Houston Apollos =

Former professional minor-league ice hockey team in Houston, Texas, United States

- City: Houston, Texas, USA
- League: Central Hockey League
- Operated: 1965-1969, 1979-1981
- Home arena: Sam Houston Coliseum

Franchise history
- 1963–1965: Omaha Knights
- 1965–1969: Houston Apollos
- 1979–1981: Houston Apollos

The Houston Apollos were a minor professional ice hockey team based in Houston, Texas. They played in the Central Hockey League from 1965 to 1969 and again from 1979 to 1981.

== History ==
From 1965 to 1969, they were a farm team of the NHL's Montreal Canadiens. The Canadiens pulled the team out and moved it to Montreal, where they became the Montreal Voyageurs of the American Hockey League. Aside from cutting back on travel costs, the Canadiens cited problems in Houston of low attendance, poor choice of dates in the local arena, and lack of practice time.

The team was revived in 1979, after the Houston Aeros of the World Hockey Association folded. The team only lasted one and a half seasons before folding on January 8, 1981. The team played in the Sam Houston Coliseum. Unremarkably, before his Hall of Fame NHL career began with the Edmonton Oilers, Mark Messier played 4 games with the Apollos in 1979 before going to Edmonton.

== Season-by-season records ==
=== Central Hockey League ===
Season	Games	Wins	Losses	Ties	Points	Goals For	Goals Against	Standing	Playoffs
1965–66	70	27	32	11	65	221	244	5th	Missed
1966–67	70	32	28	10	74	255	229	3rd	Lost Semi
1967–68	70	28	31	11	67	220	216	4th South	Missed
1968–69	72	34	26	12	80	224	204	3rd South	Lost Quarter
1979–80	80	32	38	10	74	300	319	6th	Lost Quarter
1980–81	33	12	13	8	32	97	98	Withdrew on Jan. 8th	
