= Oklahoma City Stars (ice hockey) =

Former ice hockey team in Oklahoma City, Oklahoma

- City: Oklahoma City, Oklahoma
- League: Central Hockey League
- Operated: 1978–1982
- Home arena: The Myriad
- Colors: green, gold & white
- Owners: Ron Norick & John Hail
- Affiliates: Minnesota North Stars

The Oklahoma City Stars were a minor league professional ice hockey team in the Central Hockey League from 1978 to 1982. They were affiliated with the Minnesota North Stars of the National Hockey League.

The team was run by head coach/general manager Ted Hampson, except for their final season when Tom McVie was the coach. The team made it to the league playoffs in their final two years, but lost both in the first round.

== Seasons ==
Key of colors and symbols
Color/symbol	Explanation
†	CHL champions
↑	Division champions
#	Led league in points

Year-by-year listing of Oklahoma City Stars seasons
CHL season	Division	Regular season									Postseason					
CHL season	Division	Finish	GP	W	L	T	OT	Pts	GF	GA	GP	W	L	GF	GA	Result
1978–79	–	5th	76	34	41	–	1	69	277	311	Did not qualify					
1979–80	–	7th	80	33	44	–	3	69	261	268	Did not qualify					
1980–81	–	4th	79	39	38	–	2	80	312	328	3	0	3	6	13	Lost First Round vs. Tulsa Oilers, 0–3
1981–82	South	4th	80	25	54	–	1	51	300	397	4	1	3	13	21	Lost First Round vs. Salt Lake Golden Eagles, 1–3

== Head coaches ==
#	Name	Term	Regular season					Playoffs				Championships/awards won	Reference
#	Name	Term	GC	W	L	T	OTL	Win%	GC	W	L	Championships/awards won	Reference
1	Ted Hampson	1978–1981	235	106	123	5	0	.464	3	0	3		
2	Tom McVie	1981–1982	80	25	54	1	0	.593	4	1	3		
