= 1972–73 CHL season =

American ice hockey season

The 1972–73 CHL season was the tenth season of the Central Hockey League, a North American minor professional league. Four teams participated in the regular season, and the Omaha Knights won the league title. The league played an inter-locking schedule with the Western Hockey League.

== Regular season ==
Central Hockey League	GP	W	L	OTL	GF	GA	Pts
Dallas Black Hawks	72	38	23	11	256	208	87
Omaha Knights	72	35	27	10	262	263	80
Fort Worth Wings	72	31	35	6	254	267	68
Tulsa Oilers	72	26	37	9	259	308	61

== Playoffs ==
Semifinals
1	Dallas Black Hawks
Bye
2	Omaha Knights	3
3	Fort Worth Wings	1

Final
1	Dallas Black Hawks	3
2	Omaha Knights	4
