= Kansas City Blues (ice hockey) =

- City: Kansas City, Missouri
- League: Central Hockey League
- Operated: 1967–1972, 1976–1977
- Home arena: American Royal Building (1967–72), Kemper Arena (1976–77)
- Affiliates: St. Louis Blues

Franchise history
- 1967–1972: Kansas City Blues
- 1976–1977: Kansas City Blues
- 1977–1979: Kansas City Red Wings

The Kansas City Blues were a minor-league hockey team based in Kansas City, Missouri that played in the Central Hockey League (CHL) from 1967 to 1972, and again in the 1976–77 season, mainly as an affiliate of the in-state St. Louis Blues of the National Hockey League (NHL).

The 1967 Blues were owned by Missouri Lieutenant Governor (1968-1972) William S. Morris, and represented the return of hockey to Kansas City for the first time in nearly 20 years. Morris was determined to bring an NHL team to Kansas City and tried to lay the groundwork by convincing his friend Sid Soloman, owner of the St. Louis Blues, to create a farm team in Kansas City. The Blues made history on February 21, 1971, when Blues goalie Michel Plasse became the first goaltender to score a goal in a professional hockey game, scoring against the Oklahoma City Blazers. This goal was witnessed by few as a snow storm was moving through the Kansas City area causing even Morris to leave the arena early.

The first incarnation of the Kansas City Blues played their home games at the American Royal Building, while the second incarnation played their home games at Kemper Arena, once the NHL's Kansas City Scouts moved to Denver and became the Colorado Rockies.
