= 1974–75 CHL season =

12th season of the Central Hockey League of a North American minor professional league

The 1974–75 CHL season was the 12th season of the Central Hockey League, a North American minor professional league. Eight teams participated in the regular season, and the Salt Lake Golden Eagles won the league title.

== Regular season ==
Northern Division	GP	W	L	OTL	GF	GA	Pts
Salt Lake Golden Eagles (CAL/LA)	78	43	24	11	317	245	97
Denver Spurs (STL)	78	36	29	13	285	263	85
Omaha Knights (ATL)	78	34	33	11	254	268	79
Seattle Totems (VAN)	78	29	38	11	258	296	69

Southern Division	GP	W	L	OTL	GF	GA	Pts
Dallas Black Hawks (CHI)	78	40	30	8	302	259	88
Oklahoma City Blazers (TOR)	78	33	33	12	267	267	78
Tulsa Oilers	78	27	41	10	262	289	64
Fort Worth Texans (NYI)	78	26	40	12	264	322	64

== Playoffs ==
Division Semifinal
Northern Division
N2	Denver Spurs	0
N3	Omaha Knights	2
Southern Division
S2	Oklahoma City Blazers	2
S3	Tulsa Oilers	0

Division Final
N1	Salt Lake Golden Eagles	3
N3	Omaha Knights	1
S1	Dallas Black Hawks	3
S2	Oklahoma City Blazers	0

Adams Cup Final
N1	Salt Lake Golden Eagles	4
S1	Dallas Black Hawks	3
