= St. Louis Braves =

American minor league hockey club

- City: St. Louis, Missouri
- League: Central Hockey League
- Affiliates: Chicago Blackhawks

The St. Louis Braves were a minor league hockey club located in St. Louis, Missouri.

The team originated as the Syracuse Braves in the Eastern Professional Hockey League's final season of 1962–63. The team was moved to St. Louis mid-season, and continued in the new Central Hockey League after the EPHL ceased operations.

They continued as an affiliate of the Chicago Blackhawks from 1963 until 1967. The team played its home games at the St. Louis Arena, off Interstate 64 (then US 40) across from Forest Park.

They were the last minor-league hockey club to call St. Louis home prior to the arrival of the NHL's Blues, in the fall of 1967. At that time, the franchise was moved to Dallas, Texas and became the Dallas Blackhawks, who played 15 seasons until their demise in 1982.
