= Fort Worth Texans =

- City: Fort Worth, Texas
- League: Central Hockey League
- Operated: 1967–1982
- Home arena: Will Rogers Coliseum
- Colors: Red & White (1967–1973); Blue, Orange & White (1974–1979)
- Affiliates: Detroit Red Wings, St. Louis Blues, New York Islanders, Colorado Rockies

Franchise history
- 1963: Indianapolis Capitals
- 1963–1964: Cincinnati Wings
- 1964–1967: Memphis Wings
- 1967–1974: Fort Worth Wings
- 1974–1982: Fort Worth Texans

The Fort Worth Texans were a professional ice hockey team based in Fort Worth, Texas. The Texans started playing in 1967 as the Fort Worth Wings, a minor league affiliate for the Detroit Red Wings. The team were part of the Central Hockey League and played their home games at Will Rogers Coliseum. Eventually, the Texans won their only Adams Cup Championship in 1978, by defeating their rival Dallas Black Hawks 5–4 in overtime of game seven of the finals.

== History ==
Beginning play in 1967, the Fort Worth Wings were known to be a "powerhouse." The new Wings were led by Rick McCann who scored 71 points and helped propel the Wings into the playoffs. They eventually lost in the finals. They continued to remain competitive in the following seasons, only missing the playoffs once between 1968 and 1974. In 1972, the Wings shared roster spots on the team with the St. Louis Blues due to money constraints and finally disbanded the following season. However, a new club bought the rights to the team and from 1973 to 1978 they were a farm team of the New York Islanders (with some players held for Minnesota and Los Angeles). They won the Adams cup in 1978 with the help of Richie Hansen and future NHLer Gary Smith. The team was again sold to the late Dick Andersen in 1979 to 1982, becoming a farm team of the Colorado Rockies. After the 1981–82 season, the Texans, along with the Dallas Black Hawks and Oklahoma City Stars, left the Central Hockey League. Seeing as these were the most popular teams, the move greatly affected overall attendance and the league folded after the 1983–84 season. The Texans were the only professional team to beat the 1980 USA Hockey "Miracle on Ice" Olympic team twice during the Pre-Olympic tour, winning on Jan 16, 1980, 4–3 at a sold-out Will Rogers Coliseum and then 5–3 nine days later at the Met Center in Bloomington, Minnesota. All the CHL teams played a round-robin with the Olympic team that season, with one game at home and one game in Bloomington. The games against the USA hockey team were very important to the CHL teams as they counted in the standings. The USA Olympic team finished 14–3–1 against the CHL teams. The Texans surprisingly finished 37–34–3 and reached the finals of the 1979–80 Adams Cup, losing in seven games to the Salt Lake City Golden Eagles.

== Head coaches ==
The head coaches of the franchise include Fern Flaman, Doug Barkley, Bob Lemieux, Johnny Choyce, Ed Chadwick, Terry Gray, Billy MacMillan, Ron Ullyot, and Andy Laing.
