= Dallas Black Hawks =

- City: Dallas, Texas, U.S.
- League: Central Hockey League
- Founded: 1967
- Operated: 1967-1982
- Home arena: State Fair Coliseum

Championships
- Conference titles: 1969, 1972, 1974, 1979
- Adams Cups: 1969, 1972, 1974, 1979

The Dallas Black Hawks were a minor-league professional ice hockey team in Dallas, in the U.S. state of Texas. It was a member of the Central Hockey League and played home games at State Fair Coliseum.

== Origins and relocation to Dallas ==
The Black Hawks team was originally based in St. Louis, Missouri, where it was known as the Braves from 1963 to 1967.

However, the expansion of the National Hockey League into St. Louis resulted in the relocation of the team to Dallas for the 1967–68 season. The Black Hawks remained in Dallas until ceasing operations following the 1981–82 CHL season. During that time, they won four Adams Cup championships.

While in St. Louis and Dallas, the team served as the primary minor league affiliate of the Chicago Black Hawks, using the same colors, uniform design and primary logo. The team continued working exclusively with the Chicago NHL franchise until 1976 when Chicago moved their prospects to Moncton, New Brunswick of the American Hockey League. From that time on, multiple NHL franchises supplied players to the Dallas organization.

The Black Hawks and the Fort Worth Wings/Texans had a legendary rivalry as they competed in the CHL, complete with bench clearing brawls and fights in the stands, including a legendary 10-cent beer night near-riot in Fort Worth in 1978. The series was often called the "Turnpike Series". The Texans folded at the same time as Dallas, along with the Oklahoma City Stars, which precipitated the demise of the Central Hockey League two years later.

== Post folding ==
After the Black Hawks folded, Dallas did not see another professional hockey club until the Dallas Freeze was established following the revival of the Central Hockey League for the 1992–93 season. The Freeze, in turn, were followed by the arrival of the NHL's Minnesota North Stars, which relocated and became the Dallas Stars in 1993. The Black Hawks' name and logo were later revived in 2017, as local youth hockey organization HC Dallas announced that its highest-level teams would compete as Dallas Blackhawks Elite.
