= Tulsa Oilers (1964–1984) =

- City: Tulsa, Oklahoma
- League: Central Hockey League
- Operated: 1964–1984
- Home arena: Tulsa Assembly Center; Expo Square Pavilion
- Colors: Blue and white
- Owner: Maple Leaf Gardens Limited
- Affiliates: Toronto Maple Leafs, New York Rangers

The Tulsa Oilers were a professional ice hockey team. The Oilers played 20 seasons in the Central Hockey League (CHL), originally called the Central Professional Hockey League (CPHL) until 1968, from 1964 to 1984, capturing the Adams Cup three times. Based in Tulsa, Oklahoma, the team played their home games at the Tulsa Assembly Center until the 1983–84 season when they moved to Expo Square Pavilion. The team was also locally referred to as the "Ice Oilers" to differentiate from the Tulsa Oilers minor league baseball team.

== History ==
The Central Professional Hockey League began operations with the 1963–64 season, with the Tulsa Oilers joining that league the following season. Maple Leaf Gardens Limited (MLGL) owned the team, and operated it as a developmental team for the Toronto Maple Leafs. In the spring of 1973 MLGL announced that they would relocate the team to become the Oklahoma City Blazers, with Tulsa getting a replacement independent team. The team suspended its operations on February 16, 1984, when its owners went bankrupt and the Tulsa Oilers went into receivership. Other teams in the league paid to keep the Oilers in operation so as not to unbalance the schedule, but the Oilers played only road games for final six weeks of 1983–84 season. Despite this difficulty, the team (under coach Tom Webster) went on to win the league championship before the CHL disbanded following the end of the season.

The Oilers won the Adams Cup as the CHL champions in 1968, 1976, and 1984.

== Notable players ==
- Ice hockey commentator Don Cherry best known for his work at Hockey Night in Canada played one season with the Oilers in 1965–66.
- Hockey Hall of Famer Marcel Pronovost followed his 20-year NHL career with two seasons of play on the Tulsa Oilers in the 1969–70 and 1970–71 seasons.
- Five players from the 1980 Miracle on Ice team played for the Tulsa Oilers in the late-70s and early-80s. These include Dave Silk, Bill Baker, Steve Janaszak, Rob McClanahan, and Bob Suter.
- John Vanbiesbrouck, Vezina Trophy winner with the New York Rangers in the 1984-85 season, played goaltender for the 1984 Adams Cup championship team.
- George McPhee, who served as general manager of the Washington Capitals and Vegas Golden Knights, played for the Tulsa Oilers in the mid-80s, including the 1983–84 team which won the CHL championship while being in receivership status.
- Rick Bowness, who has served as head coach of eight different NHL teams between the 1980s and 2020s, played parts of four seasons with the Tulsa Oilers, including the 1975-76 team which won the CHL championship.
