= List of Quebec Nordiques (WHA) players =

This is a list of players who played at least one game for the Quebec Nordiques of the World Hockey Association (1972–73 to 1978–79). For a list of players who played for the Nordiques in the National Hockey League, see List of Quebec Nordiques players.

== Key ==
- † Won a Avco World Trophy with the Nordiques

General abbreviations
Abbreviation	Definition
GP	Games played
AWT	Won the Avco World Trophy with the team, followed by year(s) won

Goaltender statistical abbreviations
Abbreviation	Definition
W	Wins
L	Losses
T	Ties
SO	Shutouts
GAA	Goals against average

Skater statistical abbreviations
Abbreviation	Definition
Pos	Position
G	Goals
A	Assists
P	Points
PIM	Penalty minutes
D	Defence
LW	Left wing
C	Centre
RW	Right wing

== Goaltenders ==
Goaltenders who played for the Quebec Nordiques
Name	Seasons (Note: The seasons column lists the first year of the season of the player's first game and the last year of the season of the player's last game. For example, a player who played one game in the 1972–1973 season would be listed as playing with the team from 1972–1973, regardless of what calendar year the game occurred within.)	Regular season						Playoffs					Notes
Name	Seasons	GP	W	L	T	SO	GAA	GP	W	L	SO	GAA	Notes
Serge Aubry†	1972–1977	130	59	49	5	3	3.72	3	–	–	0	–	AWT: 1977
Ken Broderick	1977–1978	24	9	8	1	0	4.37	2	–	–	0	–	
Richard Brodeur†	1972–1979	305	165	114	12	8	3.64	51	–	–	3	–	AWT: 1977
Jim Corsi	1977–1979	63	26	27	1	3	3.69	2	–	–	0	–	
Michel DeGuise	1973–1976	50	18	18	3	1	3.62	–	–	–	–	–	
Pete Donnelly	1975–1976	4	0	1	0	0	4.65	–	–	–	–	–	
Ed Humphreys	1976–1977	22	12	8	1	1	3.58	–	–	–	–	–	
Jacques Lemelin	1972–1973	9	3	4	0	0	4.01	–	–	–	–	–	
Jean-Louis Levasseur	1978–1979	3	0	1	1	0	6.00	–	–	–	–	–	
Markus Mattsson	1977–1978	6	1	3	0	0	6.77	–	–	–	–	–	
Don McLeod	1977–1978	7	2	4	0	0	4.17	–	–	–	–	–	

== Skaters ==
Skaters who played for the Quebec Nordiques
Name	Pos	Seasons	Regular season					Playoffs					Notes
Name	Pos	Seasons	GP	G	A	P	PIM	GP	G	A	P	PIM	Notes
Michel Archambault	LW	1972–1973	57	12	25	37	36	–	–	–	–	–	
Dave Balon	LW	1973–1974	9	0	0	0	2	–	–	–	–	–	
Paul Baxter†	D	1976–1979	218	22	82	104	724	27	6	11	17	84	AWT: 1977
Alain Beaule	D	1973–1975	100	8	43	51	112	–	–	–	–	–	
Jim Benzelock	RW	1975–1976	34	2	5	7	6	3	0	0	0	0	
Yves Bergeron	RW	1972–1973	65	14	19	33	32	–	–	–	–	–	
Jean Bernier†	D	1974–1978	260	17	84	101	50	32	3	8	11	4	AWT: 1977
Serge Bernier†	C	1973–1979	417	230	336	566	486	49	28	46	74	41	AWT: 1977
Gilles Bilodeau	LW	1978–1979	36	3	6	9	141	3	0	0	0	25	
Jim Blain	D	1972–1973	70	1	10	11	78	–	–	–	–	–	
Chris Bordeleau†	C	1974–1979	241	98	214	312	128	38	8	24	32	12	AWT: 1977
Paulin Bordeleau†	RW	1976–1979	234	101	76	177	125	31	17	15	32	14	AWT: 1977
Andre Boudrias†	C	1976–1978	140	22	48	70	34	28	3	14	17	10	AWT: 1977
Curt Brackenbury†	LW	1975–1979	195	37	40	77	466	36	5	7	12	102	AWT: 1977
Alain Caron	RW	1972–1975	148	74	45	119	26	–	–	–	–	–	
Jean-Yves Cartier	D	1972–1973	15	0	3	3	8	–	–	–	–	–	
Real Cloutier†	RW	1974–1979	369	283	283	566	169	48	33	30	63	29	AWT: 1977
Charles Constantin†	LW	1974–1978	186	26	34	60	229	20	0	2	2	19	AWT: 1977
Alain Cote	LW	1977–1979	106	17	18	35	31	15	1	2	3	2	
John Cunniff	LW	1975–1976	2	0	0	0	5	–	–	–	–	–	
Richard David	LW	1978–1979	14	0	4	4	4	–	–	–	–	–	
Norm Descoteaux	D	1972–1974	37	1	7	8	6	–	–	–	–	–	
Ken Desjardine	D	1972–1974	107	4	16	20	80	–	–	–	–	–	
Kevin Devine	LW	1978–1979	5	0	0	0	6	–	–	–	–	–	
Jim Dorey†	D	1976–1979	131	14	45	59	142	24	0	5	5	62	AWT: 1977
Peter Driscoll	LW	1977–1978	21	3	7	10	28	–	–	–	–	–	
Norm Dube†	LW	1976–1979	148	33	62	95	29	24	5	14	19	17	AWT: 1977
Michel Dubois†	D	1975–1977	25	0	3	3	23	2	0	1	1	0	AWT: 1977
Guy Dufour	RW	1972–1974	83	30	25	55	32	–	–	–	–	–	
Chris Evans	D	1977–1978	36	0	2	2	22	–	–	–	–	–	
Bob Fitchner†	C	1975–1979	253	41	102	143	272	37	6	12	18	34	AWT: 1977
Florent Fortier	D	1975–1976	4	1	1	2	0	1	0	0	0	0	
Gord Gallant	LW	1975–1976	64	4	15	19	297	2	0	0	0	31	
Jean-Claude Garneau	LW	1974–1975	17	0	5	5	27	–	–	–	–	–	
Andre Gaudette	C	1972–1975	222	61	105	166	34	9	0	1	1	0	
Jean-Guy Gendron	LW	1972–1974	127	28	41	69	155	–	–	–	–	–	
Dan Geoffrion	RW	1978–1979	77	12	14	26	74	4	1	2	3	2	
Jeannot Gilbert	C	1973–1975	133	24	60	84	32	11	3	6	9	2	
Rejean Giroux	RW	1972–1974	71	15	18	33	55	–	–	–	–	–	
Alan Globensky	D	1972–1976	42	1	2	3	18	2	1	0	1	0	
Frank Golembrosky	RW	1972–1973	52	8	12	20	44	–	–	–	–	–	
Richard Grenier	C	1976–1977	34	11	9	20	4	–	–	–	–	–	
Gary Gresdal	D	1975–1976	2	0	1	1	5	1	0	0	0	14	
Bob Guindon	LW	1972–1975	217	71	85	156	84	15	7	6	13	10	
Pierre Guite†	LW	1972–1978	213	44	47	91	383	17	5	0	5	9	AWT: 1977
Matti Hagman	C	1977–1978	53	25	31	56	16	–	–	–	–	–	
Ted Hampson	C	1975–1976	14	4	10	14	2	5	0	2	2	10	
Michel Harvey	C	1972–1973	40	6	13	19	14	–	–	–	–	–	
Dale Hoganson	D	1973–1979	254	22	101	123	109	22	2	6	8	8	
Rejean Houle	RW	1973–1976	214	118	139	257	115	20	12	6	18	10	
Dave Inkpen	D	1977–1978	24	0	1	1	20	–	–	–	–	–	
Ric Jordan	D	1974–1976	110	10	15	25	150	6	0	0	0	8	
Francois Lacombe†	D	1972–1979	369	35	111	146	360	46	5	10	15	39	AWT: 1977
Pierre Lagace	C	1977–1979	38	2	5	7	14	4	0	1	1	2	
Garry Lariviere†	D	1976–1979	145	12	85	97	140	32	3	13	16	16	AWT: 1977
Paul Larose	RW	1972–1973	28	0	7	7	7	–	–	–	–	–	
Rene LeClerc	C	1972–1976; 1978–1979	262	74	104	178	323	18	7	7	14	41	
Rich LeDuc	C	1978–1979	61	30	32	62	30	4	0	2	2	0	
Mike McNamara	LW	1972–1973	19	0	0	0	5	–	–	–	–	–	
Warren Miller	RW	1977–1978	60	14	24	38	50	11	0	2	2	0	
Rick Morris	LW	1977–1978	25	0	5	5	40	–	–	–	–	–	
Kevin Morrison	D	1978–1979	27	2	5	7	14	–	–	–	–	–	
Michel Parizeau	LW	1972–1976	289	91	155	246	180	15	2	4	6	10	
Denis Patry	RW	1974–1975	3	1	2	3	2	–	–	–	–	–	
Jean Payette	C	1972–1974	112	19	40	59	52	–	–	–	–	–	
Bill Prentice	D	1975–1976	21	2	5	7	89	5	0	0	0	17	
Michel Rouleau	C	1972–1975	75	8	25	33	207	–	–	–	–	–	
Pierre Roy	D	1972–1977	276	19	72	91	732	20	1	11	12	69	
Brit Selby	LW	1972–1973	7	0	1	1	4	–	–	–	–	–	
Tom Serviss	C	1975–1976	71	7	19	26	12	5	0	0	0	0	
Steve Sutherland†	LW	1974–1978	241	65	53	118	488	46	9	4	13	104	AWT: 1977
Marc Tardif†	LW	1974–1979	348	264	315	579	362	44	27	32	59	35	AWT: 1977
J.C. Tremblay†	D	1972–1979	454	66	358	424	126	34	2	23	25	4	AWT: 1977
Jim Watson	D	1975–1976	28	0	1	1	24	–	–	–	–	–	
Wally Weir†	D	1976–1979	150	5	24	29	410	32	2	8	10	67	AWT: 1977
