= Camille LaPierre =

Canadian ice hockey player

- Born: February 8, 1951 (age 74); Chicoutimi, Quebec, Canada
- Height: 5 ft 10 in (178 cm)
- Weight: 160 lb (73 kg; 11 st 6 lb)
- Position: Centre
- Shot: Left
- Played for: Philadelphia Blazers; Vancouver Blazers
- NHL draft: 76th overall, 1971; Los Angeles Kings
- Playing career: 1971–1976

Camille LaPierre (born February 8, 1951) is a Canadian former professional ice hockey player who played in the World Hockey Association (WHA). He played parts of two WHA seasons for the Philadelphia Blazers and Vancouver Blazers. LaPierre was drafted in the sixth round of the 1971 NHL Amateur Draft by the Los Angeles Kings.

== Career statistics ==
			Regular season					Playoffs
Season	Team	League	GP	G	A	Pts	PIM	GP	G	A	Pts	PIM
1969–70	Laval Saints	QMJHL	19	12	19	31	29	—	—	—	—	—
1969–70	Montreal Junior Canadiens	OHA	35	3	4	7	15	—	—	—	—	—
1970–71	Montreal Junior Canadiens	OHA	56	26	33	59	52	—	—	—	—	—
1971–72	Seattle Totems	WHL	16	7	7	14	9	—	—	—	—	—
1971–72	Springfield Kings	AHL	41	4	11	15	23	2	0	0	0	0
1972–73	Roanoke Valley Rebels	EHL	50	22	36	58	81	—	—	—	—	—
1972–73	Philadelphia Blazers	WHA	24	5	9	14	2	4	0	2	2	0
1973–74	Vancouver Blazers	WHA	9	0	3	3	0	—	—	—	—	—
1973–74	Roanoke Valley Rebels	SHL	58	48	43	91	44	19	3	5	8	6
1974–75	Roanoke Valley Rebels	SHL	42	35	45	80	14	—	—	—	—	—
1975–76	Tidewater Sharks	SHL	17	11	13	24	6	—	—	—	—	—
WHA totals			33	5	12	17	2	4	0	2	2	0
