= Neil Komadoski =

Neil Komadoski may refer to either of two ice hockey players:

- Neil Komadoski (ice hockey, born 1951), who played for the Los Angeles Kings and St. Louis Blues in the 1970s
- Neil Komadoski (ice hockey, born 1982), ice hockey player in the St. Louis Blues organization
