= List of Quebec Nordiques players =

This is a list of players who played at least one game for the Quebec Nordiques of the National Hockey League (1979–80 to 1994–95). For a list of players who played for the Nordiques in the World Hockey Association, see List of Quebec Nordiques (WHA) players.

== Key ==
Abbreviations
C	Centre
D	Defenceman
L	Left wing
R	Right wing

Goaltenders
W	Wins
L	Losses
T	Ties
SO	Shutouts
GAA	Goals against average
SV%	Save percentage

Skaters
GP	Games played
G	Goals
A	Assists
Pts	Points
PIM	Penalty minutes

The "Seasons" column lists the first year of the season of the player's first game and the last year of the season of the player's last game. For example, a player who played one game in the 2000–2001 season would be listed as playing with the team from 2000–2001, regardless of what calendar year the game occurred within.

== Skaters ==
				Regular season					Playoffs				
Player	Team	Position	Years	GP	G	A	Pts	PIM	GP	G	A	Pts	PIM
Gregory Adams		L	1989–1990	7	1	3	4	17	—	—	—	—	—
Tommy Albelin		D	1987–1989	74	5	27	32	74	—	—	—	—	—
John Anderson		R	1985–1986	65	21	28	49	26	—	—	—	—	—
Shawn Anderson		D	1990–1991	31	3	10	13	21	—	—	—	—	—
Niklas Andersson		L	1992–1993	3	0	1	1	2	—	—	—	—	—
Peter Andersson		D	1985–1986	12	1	8	9	4	2	0	1	1	0
Brent Ashton		L	1984–1987	172	78	75	153	119	21	8	5	13	22
Pierre Aubry		C	1980–1984	163	18	23	41	92	17	1	1	2	30
Wayne Babych		R	1985–1986	15	6	5	11	18	—	—	—	—	—
Joel Baillargeon		L	1988–1989	5	0	0	0	4	—	—	—	—	—
James Baker		C	1989–1992	71	9	10	19	40	—	—	—	—	—
Don Barber		L	1991–1992	2	0	0	0	0	—	—	—	—	—
Bob Bassen		L	1993–1995	84	23	23	46	88	5	2	4	6	0
Paul Baxter		D	1979–1980	61	7	13	20	145	—	—	—	—	—
Bruce Bell		D	1984–1985	75	6	31	37	44	16	2	2	4	21
Bo Berglund		L	1983–1985	87	20	28	48	26	7	2	0	2	4
Serge Bernier		C	1979–1981	78	10	22	32	49	1	0	0	0	0
Gilles Bilodeau		L	1979–1980	9	0	1	1	25	—	—	—	—	—
Michel Bolduc		D	1981–1983	10	0	0	0	6	—	—	—	—	—
John Brackenbury		R	1979–1980	63	6	8	14	55	—	—	—	—	—
Aaron Broten		C	1990–1991	20	5	4	9	6	—	—	—	—	—
Jeff Brown		D	1985–1990	237	53	117	170	166	14	3	3	6	2
Garth Butcher		D	1993–1994	34	3	9	12	67	—	—	—	—	—
Terry Carkner		D	1987–1988	63	3	24	27	159	—	—	—	—	—
Gino Cavallini		L	1991–1993	85	10	22	32	38	4	0	0	0	0
Stéphane Charbonneau		R	1991–1992	2	0	0	0	0	—	—	—	—	—
Ronald Chipperfield		C	1979–1981	16	4	5	9	10	—	—	—	—	—
Joe Cirella		D	1989–1991	95	6	24	30	126	—	—	—	—	—
Kimbel Clackson		D	1980–1981	61	0	5	5	204	5	0	0	0	33
Wendel Clark		L	1994–1995	37	12	18	30	45	6	1	2	3	6
Réal Cloutier		R	1979–1983	236	122	162	284	94	23	7	5	12	20
Roland Cloutier		C	1979–1980	14	2	3	5	0	—	—	—	—	—
René Corbet		L	1993–1995	17	1	4	5	2	2	0	1	1	0
Alain Côté		L	1979–1989	696	103	190	293	383	67	9	15	24	44
Alain Côté		D	1993–1994	6	0	0	0	4	67	9	15	24	44
Richard David		L	1979–1983	31	4	4	8	10	1	0	0	0	0
Adam Deadmarsh		R	1994–1995	48	9	8	17	56	6	0	1	1	0
Lucien DeBlois		C	1989–1991	84	11	10	21	58	—	—	—	—	—
Gilbert Delorme		D	1985–1987	83	4	18	22	65	2	0	0	0	5
William Derlago		C	1986–1987	18	3	5	8	6	—	—	—	—	—
James Dobson		R	1983–1984	1	0	0	0	0	—	—	—	—	—
Bob Dollas		D	1987–1989	25	0	3	3	18	—	—	—	—	—
Gordon Donnelly		D	1983–1989	213	10	12	22	668	14	0	0	0	53
André Doré		D	1983–1984	25	1	16	17	25	9	0	0	0	8
Daniel Doré		R	1989–1991	17	2	3	5	59	—	—	—	—	—
Mario Doyon		D	1989–1991	21	2	3	5	10	—	—	—	—	—
Gaétan Duchesne		L	1987–1989	150	32	44	76	139	—	—	—	—	—
Steve Duchesne		D	1992–1993	82	20	62	82	57	6	0	5	5	6
Luc Dufour		L	1984–1985	30	2	3	5	27	—	—	—	—	—
André Dupont		D	1980–1983	169	12	32	44	262	21	0	3	3	26
Michael Eagles		L	1982–1988	224	34	41	75	180	7	1	0	1	12
Anders Eldebrink		D	1982–1983	12	1	2	3	8	1	0	0	0	0
Leonard Esau		D	1992–1993	4	0	1	1	2	—	—	—	—	—
Dave Farrish		D	1979–1980	4	0	0	0	0	—	—	—	—	—
Steven Finn		D	1985–1995	605	29	73	102	1,514	23	0	4	4	39
Robert Fitchner		C	1979–1981	78	12	20	32	59	3	0	0	0	10
Bryan Fogarty		D	1989–1992	110	16	44	60	71	—	—	—	—	—
Adam Foote		D	1991–1995	207	8	30	38	331	12	0	2	2	16
Peter Forsberg		C	1994–1995	47	15	35	50	16	6	2	4	6	4
Marc Fortier		C	1987–1992	196	42	59	101	124	—	—	—	—	—
Iain Fraser		C	1993–1994	60	17	20	37	23	—	—	—	—	—
Miroslav Frycer		C	1981–1982	49	20	17	37	47	—	—	—	—	—
Robbie Ftorek		C	1979–1982	149	43	90	133	136	5	1	2	3	17
Jean Gaulin		R	1982–1986	26	4	3	7	8	1	0	0	0	0
Martin Gélinas		L	1993–1994	31	6	6	12	8	—	—	—	—	—
Jere Gillis		L	1981–1982	12	2	1	3	0	—	—	—	—	—
Paul Gillis		C	1982–1991	576	87	146	233	1,351	35	3	13	16	154
Michel Goulet		L	1979–1990	813	456	489	945	613	66	34	30	64	98
Jari Gronstrand		D	1988–1990	32	1	4	5	16	—	—	—	—	—
Wayne Groulx		C	1984–1985	1	0	0	0	0	—	—	—	—	—
Stéphane Guerard		D	1987–1990	34	0	0	0	40	—	—	—	—	—
Alexei Gusarov		D	1990–1995	273	22	71	93	135	5	0	1	1	0
Roger Hagglund		D	1984–1985	3	0	0	0	0	—	—	—	—	—
Jean Hamel		D	1981–1983	91	3	13	16	70	9	0	0	0	18
Gerald Hart		D	1979–1981	77	3	23	26	69	—	—	—	—	—
Alan Haworth		C	1987–1988	72	23	34	57	112	—	—	—	—	—
Yves Héroux		R	1986–1987	1	0	0	0	0	—	—	—	—	—
Pat Hickey		L	1981–1982	7	0	1	1	4	15	1	3	4	21
James Hislop		R	1979–1981	130	38	42	80	21	—	—	—	—	—
Dale Hoganson		D	1979–1982	168	7	56	63	79	11	0	3	3	12
Dean Hopkins		R	1988–1989	5	0	2	2	4	—	—	—	—	—
Michael Hough		L	1986–1993	363	68	97	165	461	15	0	4	4	28
Anthony Hrkac		C	1989–1991	92	20	40	60	18	—	—	—	—	—
William Huard		L	1994–1995	7	2	2	4	13	1	0	0	0	0
Kerry Huffman		D	1992–1994	80	4	24	28	82	3	0	0	0	0
Dale Hunter		C	1980–1987	523	140	318	458	1,545	67	16	26	42	319
Tim Hunter		R	1992–1993	48	5	3	8	94	—	—	—	—	—
Mike Hurlbut		D	1993–1994	1	0	0	0	0	—	—	—	—	—
Jeff Jackson		L	1987–1991	176	24	37	61	206	—	—	—	—	—
Iiro Jarvi		R	1988–1990	116	18	43	61	58	—	—	—	—	—
Terry Johnson		D	1979–1983	25	0	2	2	55	2	0	0	0	0
Claude Julien		D	1984–1986	14	0	1	1	25	—	—	—	—	—
Valeri Kamensky		L	1991–1995	171	60	93	153	92	8	1	1	2	6
Kevin Kaminski		C	1989–1992	6	0	0	0	45	—	—	—	—	—
Dave Karpa		D	1991–1995	78	5	13	18	175	3	0	0	0	0
Darin Kimble		R	1988–1991	105	10	11	21	448	—	—	—	—	—
Jon Klemm		D	1991–1995	15	1	1	2	6	—	—	—	—	—
John Kordic		R	1991–1992	18	0	2	2	115	—	—	—	—	—
Andrei Kovalenko		R	1992–1995	184	57	68	125	134	10	1	1	2	4
Uwe Krupp		D	1994–1995	44	6	17	23	20	5	0	2	2	2
Stu Kulak		R	1987–1988	14	1	1	2	28	—	—	—	—	—
Mark Kumpel		R	1984–1987	129	19	27	46	59	20	4	4	8	4
Francois Lacombe		D	1979–1980	3	0	0	0	2	—	—	—	—	—
Pierre Lacroix		D	1979–1983	218	18	83	101	179	8	0	2	2	10
Guy Lafleur		R	1989–1991	98	24	38	62	6	—	—	—	—	—
Jason Lafrenière		C	1986–1988	96	23	34	57	12	12	1	5	6	2
Dan Lambert		D	1990–1992	29	6	9	15	22	—	—	—	—	—
Lane Lambert		R	1986–1989	89	20	35	55	139	13	2	4	6	30
Claude Lapointe		C	1990–1995	253	40	73	113	299	11	2	4	6	16
Richard Lapointe		D	1982–1984	65	4	19	23	71	3	0	0	0	0
Garry Larivière		D	1979–1981	127	5	32	37	106	—	—	—	—	—
David Latta		L	1985–1991	36	4	8	12	4	—	—	—	—	—
Janne Laukkanen		D	1994–1995	11	0	3	3	4	6	1	0	1	2
Brian Lawton		C	1989–1990	14	5	6	11	10	—	—	—	—	—
Richard Leduc		C	1979–1981	97	24	34	58	55	—	—	—	—	—
Edward Lee		R	1984–1985	2	0	0	0	5	—	—	—	—	—
Sylvain Lefebvre		D	1994–1995	48	2	11	13	17	6	0	2	2	2
Barry Legge		D	1979–1980	31	0	3	3	18	—	—	—	—	—
Alain Lemieux		C	1984–1986	37	11	11	22	14	15	4	5	9	0
Curtis Leschyshyn		D	1988–1995	434	30	87	117	352	9	1	2	3	10
Chris Lindberg		L	1993–1994	37	6	8	14	12	—	—	—	—	—
Bill Lindsay		L	1991–1993	67	6	13	19	30	—	—	—	—	—
Claude Loiselle		C	1989–1991	131	16	24	40	190	—	—	—	—	—
Peter Loob		D	1984–1985	8	1	2	3	0	—	—	—	—	—
Paul MacDermid		R	1993–1995	58	5	4	9	57	3	0	0	0	2
Jacques Mailhot		L	1988–1989	5	0	0	0	33	—	—	—	—	—
Bruce Major		L	1990–1991	4	0	0	0	0	—	—	—	—	—
William Malone		C	1985–1987	33	3	6	9	18	2	0	0	0	0
James Mann		R	1983–1986	82	1	8	9	244	18	0	0	0	82
Dave Marcinyshyn		D	1991–1992	5	0	0	0	26	—	—	—	—	—
Mario Marois		D	1980–1990	403	38	162	200	778	45	2	15	17	68
Terry Martin		L	1979–1980	3	0	0	0	0	—	—	—	—	—
Brad Maxwell		D	1984–1985	50	7	24	31	119	18	2	9	11	35
Mike McKee		D	1993–1994	48	3	12	15	41	—	—	—	—	—
Tony McKegney		L	1983–1991	203	69	63	132	124	7	0	0	0	0
Michael McNeil		R	1990–1992	40	3	9	12	12	—	—	—	—	—
Basil McRae		L	1981–1987	75	14	9	23	277	22	4	1	5	133
Ken McRae		C	1987–1992	126	13	20	33	326	—	—	—	—	—
Max Middendorf		R	1986–1990	10	1	4	5	4	—	—	—	—	—
Aaron Miller		D	1993–1995	10	0	3	3	6	—	—	—	—	—
Kip Miller		C	1990–1992	49	9	13	22	19	—	—	—	—	—
Randy Moller		D	1982–1989	508	33	119	152	1,002	48	5	6	11	138
Stéphane Morin		C	1989–1992	84	15	37	52	46	—	—	—	—	—
Mike Natyshak		R	1987–1988	4	0	0	0	0	—	—	—	—	—
Owen Nolan		R	1990–1995	259	113	103	216	531	11	3	3	6	8
Dwayne Norris		R	1993–1995	17	2	3	5	6	—	—	—	—	—
Lee Norwood		D	1980–1982	13	1	1	2	11	3	0	0	0	2
John Ogrodnick		L	1986–1987	32	11	16	27	4	13	9	4	13	6
Alvin Paddock		R	1980–1981	32	2	5	7	25	2	0	0	0	0
Wilf Paiement		R	1981–1986	280	102	121	223	619	45	13	10	23	114
Gregory Paslawski		R	1991–1992	80	28	17	45	18	—	—	—	—	—
Steve Patrick		R	1985–1986	27	4	13	17	17	3	0	0	0	6
Scott Pearson		L	1990–1993	86	25	7	32	195	3	0	0	0	0
Michel Petit		D	1989–1991	82	16	31	47	262	—	—	—	—	—
Robert Picard		D	1985–1990	289	25	79	104	299	16	2	12	14	12
Dave Pichette		D	1980–1984	189	16	74	90	275	19	2	5	7	36
Pierre Plante		R	1979–1980	69	4	14	18	68	—	—	—	—	—
Walt Poddubny		L	1988–1989	72	38	37	75	107	—	—	—	—	—
Daniel Poudrier		D	1985–1988	25	1	5	6	10	—	—	—	—	—
Pat Price		D	1982–1987	255	8	72	80	497	33	1	5	6	79
Ken Quinney		R	1986–1991	59	7	13	20	23	—	—	—	—	—
Herb Raglan		R	1990–1992	77	7	17	24	150	—	—	—	—	—
Mike Ricci		C	1992–1995	208	72	93	165	276	12	1	9	10	16
Jacques Richard		L	1979–1983	186	79	103	182	126	19	3	4	7	25
Jean-Marc Richard		D	1987–1990	5	2	1	3	2	—	—	—	—	—
Serge Roberge		R	1990–1991	9	0	0	0	24	—	—	—	—	—
Normand Rochefort		D	1980–1988	480	32	104	136	452	59	5	4	9	56
Jean-Marc Routhier		R	1989–1990	8	0	0	0	9	—	—	—	—	—
Martin Rucinsky		L	1991–1995	161	31	60	91	125	6	1	1	2	4
Andrew Rymsha		D	1991–1992	6	0	0	0	23	—	—	—	—	—
Joe Sakic		C	1988–1995	508	234	392	626	183	12	7	4	11	2
Everett Sanipass		L	1989–1991	38	8	8	16	49	—	—	—	—	—
Bernie Saunders		L	1979–1981	10	0	1	1	8	—	—	—	—	—
Jean-François Sauvé		C	1983–1987	192	41	89	130	47	29	7	10	17	10
Reginald Savage		C	1993–1994	17	3	4	7	16	—	—	—	—	—
André Savard		C	1983–1985	95	29	34	63	46	9	3	0	3	2
Paxton Schulte		L	1993–1994	1	0	0	0	2	—	—	—	—	—
Jaroslav Sevcik		L	1989–1990	13	0	2	2	2	—	—	—	—	—
Brent Severyn		L	1989–1990	35	0	2	2	42	—	—	—	—	—
Scott Shaunessy		R	1986–1989	7	0	0	0	23	—	—	—	—	—
David Shaw		D	1982–1987	167	7	38	45	158	—	—	—	—	—
Douglas Shedden		C	1986–1987	16	0	2	2	8	—	—	—	—	—
Risto Siltanen		D	1985–1987	79	12	34	46	38	16	1	10	11	10
Chris Simon		L	1992–1995	82	8	14	22	305	11	1	1	2	45
Tommy Sjodin		D	1993–1994	22	1	9	10	18	—	—	—	—	—
Louis Sleigher		R	1979–1985	111	30	32	62	81	11	1	1	2	46
Douglas Smail		L	1991–1992	46	10	18	28	47	—	—	—	—	—
John Smrke		L	1979–1980	30	3	5	8	2	—	—	—	—	—
Greg Smyth		D	1988–1992	53	0	3	3	265	—	—	—	—	—
Dennis Sobchuk		C	1982–1983	2	1	0	1	2	—	—	—	—	—
Anton Stastny		L	1980–1989	650	252	384	636	150	66	20	32	52	31
Marian Stastny		R	1981–1985	252	98	143	241	89	29	5	17	22	7
Peter Stastny		C	1980–1990	737	380	668	1,048	687	64	24	57	81	96
Blair Stewart		L	1979–1980	30	8	6	14	15	—	—	—	—	—
John Stewart		C	1979–1980	2	0	0	0	0	—	—	—	—	—
Paul Stewart		R	1979–1980	21	2	0	2	74	—	—	—	—	—
Trevor Stienburg		R	1985–1989	71	8	4	12	166	1	0	0	0	0
Mats Sundin		C	1990–1994	324	135	199	334	317	6	3	1	4	6
Ronald Sutter		C	1993–1994	37	9	13	22	44	—	—	—	—	—
Christian Tanguay		R	1981–1982	2	0	0	0	0	—	—	—	—	—
Marc Tardif		L	1979–1983	272	116	128	244	154	22	2	5	7	20
Mikhail Tatarinov		D	1991–1993	94	13	33	46	100	—	—	—	—	—
Gregory Tebbutt		D	1979–1980	2	0	1	1	4	—	—	—	—	—
Gaston Therrien		D	1980–1983	22	0	8	8	12	9	0	1	1	4
Reginald Thomas		C	1979–1980	39	9	7	16	6	—	—	—	—	—
John Tonelli		L	1991–1992	19	2	4	6	14	—	—	—	—	—
Timothy Tookey		C	1982–1983	12	1	6	7	4	—	—	—	—	—
Anthony Twist		L	1990–1994	151	0	7	7	433	—	—	—	—	—
John Van Boxmeer		D	1983–1984	18	5	3	8	12	—	—	—	—	—
Wayne Van Dorp		L	1990–1992	28	4	5	9	139	—	—	—	—	—
Yvon Vautour		R	1984–1985	5	0	0	0	2	—	—	—	—	—
Randy Velischek		D	1990–1992	117	4	13	17	64	—	—	—	—	—
Mark Vermette		R	1988–1992	67	5	13	18	33	—	—	—	—	—
Dan Vincelette		L	1989–1991	27	0	2	2	63	—	—	—	—	—
Edward Ward		R	1993–1994	7	1	0	1	5	—	—	—	—	—
Edward Weir		R	1979–1984	272	19	39	58	535	23	0	1	1	96
John Wensink		L	1980–1981	53	6	3	9	124	3	0	0	0	0
Brad Werenka		D	1993–1994	11	0	7	7	8	—	—	—	—	—
Trevor Wesley		D	1982–1985	119	6	18	24	187	19	2	2	4	30
Craig Wolanin		D	1989–1995	289	17	47	64	348	10	1	1	2	8
Scott Young		R	1992–1995	206	74	76	150	48	12	7	4	11	2
Richard Zemlak		C	1986–1987	20	0	2	2	47	—	—	—	—	—

== Goaltenders ==
			Regular season							Playoffs					
Player	Team	Years	GP	W	L	T	SO	GAA	SV%	GP	W	L	SO	GAA	SV%
Daniel Bouchard		1980–1985	225	107	79	36	5	3.59	—	30	12	18	1	3.32	—
Mario Brunetta		1987–1990	40	12	17	1	0	3.92	0.871	—	—	—	—	—	—
Jacques Cloutier		1990–1994	58	12	26	7	0	3.92	0.881	—	—	—	—	—	—
Michel Dion		1979–1981	62	15	33	9	2	4.02	—	—	—	—	—	—	—
Stéphane Fiset		1989–1995	151	62	61	15	5	3.42	0.891	5	1	2	0	4.43	0.866
Brian Ford		1983–1984	3	1	1	0	0	6.34	—	—	—	—	—	—	—
John Garrett		1981–1983	29	10	13	5	0	4.52	—	5	3	2	0	3.90	—
Scott Gordon		1989–1991	23	2	16	0	0	5.60	0.829	—	—	—	—	—	—
Mario Gosselin		1983–1989	192	79	83	12	6	3.67	—	29	16	13	0	3.29	—
Ronald Grahame		1980–1981	8	1	5	1	0	5.47	—	—	—	—	—	—	—
Ron Hextall		1992–1993	54	29	16	5	0	3.45	0.888	6	2	4	0	2.90	0.915
Goran Hogosta		1979–1980	21	5	12	3	1	4.15	—	—	—	—	—	—	—
Ronald Low		1979–1980	15	5	7	2	0	3.70	—	—	—	—	—	—	—
Clint Malarchuk		1981–1987	140	62	53	18	5	3.62	—	6	0	4	0	4.03	—
Robert Mason		1988–1989	22	5	14	1	0	4.72	0.853	—	—	—	—	—	—
Gregory Millen		1989–1990	18	3	14	1	0	5.28	0.853	—	—	—	—	—	—
Sergei Mylnikov		1989–1990	10	1	7	2	0	4.97	0.857	—	—	—	—	—	—
Michel Plasse		1980–1982	41	12	17	10	0	3.96	—	1	0	0	0	4.00	—
Richard Sévigny		1984–1987	35	13	13	3	1	3.71	—	—	—	—	—	—	—
Garth Snow		1993–1995	7	4	3	0	0	4.07	0.858	1	0	0	0	6.78	0.667
John Tanner		1989–1992	21	2	11	5	1	3.60	0.883	—	—	—	—	—	—
Jocelyn Thibault		1993–1995	47	20	15	5	1	2.95	0.901	3	1	2	0	3.24	0.895
Ron Tugnutt		1987–1992	153	35	83	19	1	4.08	0.876	—	—	—	—	—	—

== See also ==
- List of NHL players
- List of Quebec Nordiques (WHA) players
