= Chris Hayes (ice hockey) =

Canadian ice hockey player

- Born: August 24, 1946 (age 78); Rouyn, Quebec, Canada
- Height: 5 ft 10 in (178 cm)
- Weight: 180 lb (82 kg; 12 st 12 lb)
- Position: Left wing
- Shot: Left
- Played for: Boston Bruins
- Playing career: 1963–1976

Christopher Joseph Hayes (born August 24, 1946) is a Canadian former professional ice hockey player, most notable for the single game he played in the 1972 Stanley Cup semifinals for the eventual Stanley Cup champion Boston Bruins, his sole National Hockey League appearance.

== Biography ==
He grew up in Chapeau, Quebec, a small village bordering on the Ottawa Valley. Hayes spent three years playing junior hockey for Oshawa 1965-68. He left hockey for two years, but returned in the 1970-71 season to play for Loyola College in Montreal. He then turned pro playing in four pro leagues for five different teams in a four-year span.

While playing for the Oklahoma City Blazers of the Central Hockey League in 1972, Hayes was called up due to injuries to play for the Boston Bruins. He played one game in the 1972 playoffs: Game #3 of Boston's semifinal series in St. Louis versus the Blues. Boston won 7-2. Hayes recorded no points and no penalty minutes, but he did serve a Boston bench penalty for too many men on the ice. Hayes never played in the NHL again. Although Hayes was entitled to have his name engraved on the Stanley Cup for having appeared in a playoff game, it was not. Hayes was not re-signed by the Boston organization after the end of the 1973-74 season, and played four games in the NAHL in 1975-76, his final professional action. In April 2018, Chris Hayes finally received his Stanley Cup ring after Boston's team president Cam Neely learned about Hayes' situation.

== Career statistics ==
=== Regular season and playoffs ===
			Regular season					Playoffs
Season	Team	League	GP	G	A	Pts	PIM	GP	G	A	Pts	PIM
1963–64	Pembroke Ironmen	OHA-B	—	—	—	—	—	—	—	—	—	—
1964–65	Oshawa Generals	OHA	44	8	7	15	0	—	—	—	—	—
1965–66	Oshawa Generals	OHA	44	8	14	22	92	—	—	—	—	—
1965–66	Oshawa Generals	M-Cup	—	—	—	—	—	14	10	14	24	20
1966–67	Oshawa Generals	OHA	39	3	11	14	57	—	—	—	—	—
1967–68	Loyola University	CIAU	—	—	—	—	—	—	—	—	—	—
1968–69	Loyola University	CIAU	—	—	—	—	—	—	—	—	—	—
1969–70	Loyola University	CIAU	35	27	48	75	79	—	—	—	—	—
1970–71	Loyola University	CIAU	34	26	54	80	—	—	—	—	—	—
1971–72	Oklahoma City Blazers	CHL	72	15	38	53	59	6	5	4	9	2
1971–72	Boston Bruins	NHL	—	—	—	—	—	1	0	0	0	0
1972–73	Boston Braves	AHL	63	9	19	28	31	10	2	5	7	4
1973–74	Albuquerque Six Guns	CHL	71	20	28	48	118	—	—	—	—	—
1975–76	Mohawk Valley Comets	NAHL	4	1	2	3	2	—	—	—	—	—
CHL totals			143	35	66	101	177	6	5	4	9	2
NHL totals			—	—	—	—	—	1	0	0	0	0

== See also ==
- List of players who played only one game in the NHL
