= Lawrence O'Connor =

Lawrence O'Connor may refer to:

- Larry O'Connor (radio host) (born 1967), American radio host
- Larry O'Connor (ice hockey) (born 1950), Canadian ice hockey player
- Larry O'Connor (politician) (born 1956), Canadian politician
- Larry O'Connor (athlete) (1916–1995), Canadian Olympic athlete
- Lawrence J. O'Connor (died 1900), American architect
- Lawrence O'Connor (rapist) (died 1964), criminal executed by the state of Texas in 1964
