= Larry O'Connor (ice hockey) =

Canadian ice hockey player

- Born: April 1, 1950 (age 75) Montreal, Quebec, Canada
- Height: 5 ft 11 in (180 cm)
- Weight: 170 lb (77 kg; 12 st 2 lb)
- Position: Defence
- Played for: EHL; Jersey Devils; CHL; Omaha Knights; Albuquerque Six-Guns; IHL; Des Moines Oak Leafs; Port Huron Flags; AHL; Providence Reds; WHL; Denver Spurs
- NHL draft: Undrafted
- Playing career: 1970–1975

Larry O'Connor (born April 1, 1950) is a Canadian former professional ice hockey defenceman.

== Early life ==
O'Connor was born in Montreal. He played junior hockey in the Quebec Major Junior Hockey League (QMJHL), and was recognized for his outstanding performance when he was selected to the 1969–70 QMJHL First All-Star Team.

== Career ==
O'Connor played five seasons of professional hockey, including 125 games in the CHL with the Omaha Knights and Albuquerque Six-Guns, and 80 games played in the AHL with the Providence Reds.

== Career statistics ==
			Regular season					Playoffs
Season	Team	League	GP	G	A	Pts	PIM	GP	G	A	Pts	PIM
1969–70	Laval Saints	QMJHL	53	4	19	23	108	—	—	—	—	—
1969–70	Jersey Devils	EHL-Sr.	—	—	—	—	—	—	—	—	—	—
1970–71	Jersey Devils	EHL-Sr.	71	6	12	18	112	—	—	—	—	—
1970–71	Omaha Knights	CHL	5	0	2	2	2	2	0	1	1	2
1971–72	Omaha Knights	CHL	48	0	10	10	53	—	—	—	—	—
1971–72	Des Moines Oak Leafs	IHL	9	0	2	2	2	—	—	—	—	—
1972–73	Denver Spurs	WHL-Sr.	40	0	12	12	106	5	0	0	0	22
1972–73	Providence Reds	AHL	27	0	6	6	10	—	—	—	—	—
1973–74	Albuquerque Six Guns	CHL	72	5	16	21	167	—	—	—	—	—
1974–75	Port Huron Flags	IHL	19	0	7	7	25	—	—	—	—	—
1974–75	Providence Reds	AHL	53	2	10	12	54	6	1	0	1	9
AHL totals			80	2	16	18	64	6	1	0	1	9
CHL totals			125	5	28	33	222	2	0	1	1	2
IHL totals			28	0	9	9	27	—	—	—	—	—

== Awards and honors ==
Award	Year
QMJHL First Team All-Star	1969–70
