= Doug Kerslake =

Canadian ice hockey player

- Born: March 23, 1950 Saskatoon, Saskatchewan, Canada
- Died: April 25, 2015 (aged 65) Edmonton, Alberta, Canada
- Height: 5 ft 10 in (178 cm)
- Weight: 205 lb (93 kg; 14 st 9 lb)
- Position: Right wing
- Shot: Right
- Played for: Edmonton Oilers (WHA)
- NHL draft: 60th overall, 1970; Philadelphia Flyers
- Playing career: 1970–1976

Douglas Robert Kerslake (March 23, 1950 – April 25, 2015) was a Canadian professional ice hockey player. He played 23 games in the WHA with the Edmonton Oilers.

== Career statistics ==
			Regular season					Playoffs
Season	Team	League	GP	G	A	Pts	PIM	GP	G	A	Pts	PIM
1969–70	Edmonton Oil Kings	WCHL	42	16	12	28	126	—	—	—	—	—
1970–71	Edmonton Oil Kings	WCHL	50	14	32	46	186	—	—	—	—	—
1971–72	Roanoke Valley Rebels	EHL-Sr.	33	7	6	13	95	—	—	—	—	—
1972–73	Dallas Black Hawks	CHL	1	1	1	2	0	6	1	1	2	16
1972–73	Flint Generals	IHL	57	17	13	30	205	4	1	0	1	15
1973–74	Dallas Black Hawks	CHL	21	4	1	5	77	—	—	—	—	—
1974–75	Dallas Black Hawks	CHL	1	0	0	0	5	—	—	—	—	—
1974–75	Flint Generals	IHL	13	0	2	2	33	—	—	—	—	—
1974–75	Edmonton Oilers	WHA	10	4	0	4	10	—	—	—	—	—
1975–76	Edmonton Oilers	WHA	13	1	1	2	4	—	—	—	—	—
1975–76	Greensboro Generals	SHL-Sr.	20	3	5	8	46	—	—	—	—	—
WHA totals			23	5	1	6	14	—	—	—	—	—
IHL totals			70	17	15	32	238	4	1	0	1	15
CHL totals			23	5	2	7	82	6	1	1	2	16
