= 1971 NHL amateur draft =

1971 North American ice hockey draft

General information
- Date: June 10, 1971
- Location: Queen Elizabeth Hotel; Montreal, Quebec, Canada

Overview
- 117 total selections in 15 rounds
- First selection: (Canada) Guy Lafleur (Montreal Canadiens)
- Hall of Famers: 3: RW Guy Lafleur; C Marcel Dionne; D Larry Robinson

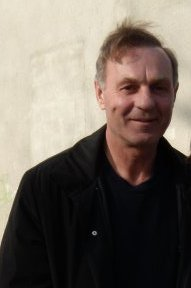
Guy Lafleur in 2010

The 1971 NHL amateur draft was the ninth draft for the National Hockey League. It was held on June 10, 1971, at the Queen Elizabeth Hotel in Montreal.

The last active player in the NHL from this draft class was Larry Robinson, who retired after the 1991–92 season.

== Selections by round ==
Below are listed the selections in the 1971 NHL amateur draft.

= NHL All-Star team ·	= NHL All-Star (Note: Players are identified as an All-Star if they were selected for the All-Star game at any time in their career.) ·	= NHL All-Star and NHL All-Star team ·	= Hall of Famers

=== Round one ===
#	Player	Nationality	NHL team	College/junior/club team
1	Guy Lafleur (C)	Canada	Montreal Canadiens (from California)^{1}	Quebec Remparts (QMJHL)
2	Marcel Dionne (C)	Canada	Detroit Red Wings	St. Catharines Black Hawks (OHA)
3	Jocelyn Guevremont (D)	Canada	Vancouver Canucks	Montreal Junior Canadiens (OHA)
4	Gene Carr (C)	Canada	St. Louis Blues (from Pittsburgh)^{2}	Flin Flon Bombers (WCHL)
5	Rick Martin (LW)	Canada	Buffalo Sabres	Montreal Junior Canadiens (OHA)
6	Ron Jones (D)	Canada	Boston Bruins (from Los Angeles)^{3}	Edmonton Oil Kings (WCHL)
7	Chuck Arnason (RW)	Canada	Montreal Canadiens (from Minnesota)^{4}	Flin Flon Bombers (WCHL)
8	Larry Wright (C)	Canada	Philadelphia Flyers	Regina Pats (WCHL)
9	Pierre Plante (RW)	Canada	Philadelphia Flyers (from Toronto)^{5}	Drummondville Rangers (QMJHL)
10	Steve Vickers (LW)	Canada	New York Rangers (from St. Louis)^{6}	Toronto Marlboros (OHA)
11	Murray Wilson (LW)	Canada	Montreal Canadiens	Ottawa 67's (OHA)
12	Dan Spring (C)	Canada	Chicago Black Hawks	Edmonton Oil Kings (WCHL)
13	Steve Durbano (D)	Canada	New York Rangers	Toronto Marlboros (OHA)
14	Terry O'Reilly (RW)	Canada	Boston Bruins	Oshawa Generals (OHA)
^{Reference: "1971 NHL Amateur Draft hockeydraftcentral.com".}

Notes

1. The California Golden Seals' first-round pick went to the Montreal Canadiens as the result of a trade on May 22, 1970 that sent Ernie Hicke and Montreal's 1970 first-round pick (Chris Oddleifson) to California in exchange for Francois Lacombe, cash and this pick.
2. The Pittsburgh Penguins' first-round pick went to the St. Louis Blues as the result of a trade on June 6, 1969 that sent Craig Cameron, Ron Schock and St. Louis' second-round pick in 1972 to Pittsburgh in exchange for Lou Angotti and this pick.
3. The Los Angeles Kings' first-round pick went to the Boston Bruins as the result of a trade on May 14, 1969 that sent Ross Lonsberry and Eddie Shack to Los Angeles in exchange for Los Angeles' first round pick in 1973, Ken Turlik and this pick.
4. The Minnesota North Stars' first-round pick went to the Montreal Canadiens as the result of a trade on June 6, 1967 that sent Minnesota's first-round pick in 1971 to Montreal in exchange for Andre Boudrias, Bob Charlebois and Bernard Cote.
5. The Toronto Maple Leafs' first-round pick went to the Philadelphia Flyers as the result of a trade on January 31, 1971 that sent Bernie Parent and Philadelphia's second-round pick in 1971 to Toronto in exchange for Bruce Gamble, Mike Walton and this pick.
6. The St. Louis Blues' first-round pick went to the New York Rangers as the result of a trade on May 25, 1971 that sent Peter McDuffe to St. Louis in exchange for this pick.

=== Round two ===
#	Player	Nationality	NHL team	College/junior/club team
15	Ken Baird (D)	Canada	California Golden Seals	Flin Flon Bombers (WCHL)
16	Henry Boucha (C)	United States	Detroit Red Wings	US National Development Team
17	Bobby Lalonde (C)	Canada	Vancouver Canucks	Montreal Junior Canadiens (OHA)
18	Brian McKenzie (LW)	Canada	Pittsburgh Penguins	St Catharines Black Hawks (OHA)
19	Craig Ramsay (LW)	Canada	Buffalo Sabres	Peterborough Petes (OHA)
20	Larry Robinson (D)	Canada	Montreal Canadiens (from Los Angeles)^{1}	Kitchener Rangers (OHA)
21	Rod Norrish (LW)	Canada	Minnesota North Stars	Regina Pats (WCHL)
22	Rick Kehoe (RW)	Canada	Toronto Maple Leafs (from Philadelphia)^{2}	Hamilton Red Wings (OHA)
23	Dave Fortier (D)	Canada	Toronto Maple Leafs	St Catharines Black Hawks (OHA)
24	Michel DeGuise (G)	Canada	Montreal Canadiens (from St. Louis)^{3}	Sorel Eperviers (QMJHL)
25	Terry French (C)	Canada	Montreal Canadiens	Ottawa 67's (OHA)
26	Dave Kryskow (LW)	Canada	Chicago Black Hawks	Edmonton Oil Kings (WCHL)
27	Tom Williams (LW)	Canada	New York Rangers	Hamilton Red Wings (OHA)
28	Curt Ridley (G)	Canada	Boston Bruins	Portage Terriers (MJHL)
^{Reference: "1971 NHL Amateur Draft hockeydraftcentral.com".}

1. The Los Angeles Kings' second-round pick went to the Montreal Canadiens as the result of a trade on January 23, 1970 that sent Dick Duff to Los Angeles in exchange for Dennis Hextall and this pick.
2. The Philadelphia Flyers' second-round pick went to the Toronto Maple Leafs as the result of a trade on January 31, 1971 that sent Toronto's first-round pick in 1971 (Pierre Plante), Bruce Gamble and Mike Walton to Philadelphia in exchange for Bernie Parent and this pick.
3. The St. Louis Blues' second-round pick went to the Montreal Canadiens as the result of a trade on January 28, 1971 that sent Fran Huck to St. Louis in exchange for this pick.

=== Round three ===
#	Player	Nationality	NHL team	College/junior/club team
29	Rich LeDuc (C)	Canada	California Golden Seals	Trois-Rivières Draveurs (QMJHL)
30	Ralph Hopiavuori (D)	Canada	Toronto Maple Leafs	Toronto Marlboros (OHA)
31	Jim Cahoon (C)	Canada	Montreal Canadiens (from Vancouver)^{1}	University of North Dakota (WCHA)
32	Joe Noris (D)	United States	Pittsburgh Penguins	Toronto Marlboros (OHA)
33	Bill Hajt (D)	Canada	Buffalo Sabres	Saskatoon Blades (WCHL)
34	Vic Venasky (C)	Canada	Los Angeles Kings	University of Denver (WCHA)
35	Ron Wilson (D)	Canada	Minnesota North Stars	Flin Flon Bombers (WCHL)
36	Glen Irwin (D)	Canada	Philadelphia Flyers	Estevan Bruins (WCHL)
37	Gavin Kirk (C)	Canada	Toronto Maple Leafs	Toronto Marlboros (OHA)
38	John Garrett (G)	Canada	St. Louis Blues	Peterborough Petes (OHA)
39	Richard Lemieux (C)	Canada	Vancouver Canucks (from Montreal)^{2}	Montreal Junior Canadiens (OHA)
40	Bob Peppler (LW)	Canada	Chicago Black Hawks	St Catharines Black Hawks (OHA)
41	Terry West (C)	Canada	New York Rangers	London Knights (OHA)
42	Dave Bonter (C)	Canada	Boston Bruins	Estevan Bruins (WCHL)
^{Reference: "1971 NHL Amateur Draft hockeydraftcentral.com".}

1. The Vancouver Canucks' third-round pick went to the Montreal Canadiens as the result of a trade on May 25, 1971 that sent Vancouver's fourth-round pick in 1971, cash and this pick to Montreal in exchange for Gregg Boddy and Montreal's third-round pick in 1971.
2. The Montreal Canadiens' third-round pick went to the Vancouver Canucks as the result of a trade on May 25, 1971 that sent Vancouver's third-round pick (Jim Cahoon) and fourth-round pick in 1971 along with cash to Montreal in exchange for Gregg Boddy and this pick.

=== Round four ===
#	Player	Nationality	NHL team	College/junior/club team
43	Hartland Monahan (RW)	Canada	California Golden Seals	Montreal Junior Canadiens (OHA)
44	George Hulme (G)	Canada	Detroit Red Wings	St Catharines Black Hawks (OHA)
45	Ed Sidebottom (D)	Canada	Montreal Canadiens (from Vancouver)^{1}	Estevan Bruins (WCHL)
46	Gerry Methe (LW)	Canada	Pittsburgh Penguins	Oshawa Generals (OHA)
47	Bob Richer (C)	Canada	Buffalo Sabres	Trois-Rivières Draveurs (QMJHL)
48	Neil Komadoski (D)	Canada	Los Angeles Kings	Winnipeg Jets (WCHL)
49	Mike Legge (LW)	Canada	Minnesota North Stars	Winnipeg Jets (WCHL)
50	Ted Scharf (D)	Canada	Philadelphia Flyers	Kitchener Rangers (OHA)
51	Rick Cunningham (D)	Canada	Toronto Maple Leafs	Peterborough Petes (OHA)
52	Derek Harker (D)	Canada	St. Louis Blues	Edmonton Oil Kings (WCHL)
53	Greg Hubick (D)	Canada	Montreal Canadiens	University of Minnesota Duluth (WCHA)
54	Clyde Simon (RW)	Canada	Chicago Black Hawks	St Catharines Black Hawks (OHA)
55	Jerry Butler (RW)	Canada	New York Rangers	Hamilton Red Wings (OHA)
56	Dave Hynes (LW)	United States	Boston Bruins	Harvard University (ECAC)
^{Reference: "1971 NHL Amateur Draft hockeydraftcentral.com".}

1. The Vancouver Canucks' fourth-round pick went to the Montreal Canadiens as the result of a trade on May 25, 1971 that sent Vancouver's third-round pick (Jim Cahoon), cash and this pick to Montreal in exchange for Gregg Boddy and Montreal's third-round pick in 1971 (Richard Lemieux).

=== Round five ===
#	Player	Nationality	NHL team	College/junior/club team
57	Ray Belanger (G)	Canada	California Golden Seals	Shawinigan Dynamos (QMJHL)
58	Earl Anderson (RW)	United States	Detroit Red Wings	University of North Dakota (WCHA)
59	Mike McNiven (LW)	Canada	Vancouver Canucks	Halifax Jr. Canadians (NSJHL)
60	Dave Murphy (G)	Canada	Pittsburgh Penguins	University of North Dakota (WCHA)
61	Steve Warr (D)	Canada	Buffalo Sabres	Clarkson University (ECAC)
62	Gary Crosby (C)	Canada	Los Angeles Kings	Michigan Technological University (WCHA)
63	Brian McBratney (D)	Canada	Minnesota North Stars	St Catharines Black Hawks (OHA)
64	Don McCulloch (D)	Canada	Philadelphia Flyers	Niagara Falls Flyers (OHA)
65	Bob Sykes (LW)	Canada	Toronto Maple Leafs	Sudbury Wolves (NOHA)
66	Wayne Gibbs (D)	Canada	St. Louis Blues	Calgary Centennials (WCHL)
67	Mike Busniuk (D)	Canada	Montreal Canadiens	University of Denver (WCHA)
68	Dean Blais (LW)	United States	Chicago Black Hawks	University of Minnesota (WCHA)
69	Fraser Robertson (D)	Canada	New York Rangers	Lethbridge Sugar Kings (AJHL)
70	Bert Scott (C)	Canada	Boston Bruins	Edmonton Oil Kings (WCHL)
^{Reference: "1971 NHL Amateur Draft hockeydraftcentral.com".}

=== Round six ===
#	Player	Nationality	NHL team	College/junior/club team
71	Gerry Egers (D)	Canada	California Golden Seals	Sudbury Wolves (NOHA)
72	Charlie Shaw (D)	Canada	Detroit Red Wings	Toronto Marlboros (OHA)
73	Tim Steeves (D)	Canada	Vancouver Canucks	Charlottetown Royals (NBSHL)
74	Ian Williams (RW)	Canada	Pittsburgh Penguins	University of Notre Dame (NCAA)
75	Pierre Duguay (C)	Canada	Buffalo Sabres	Quebec Remparts (QMJHL)
76	Camille LaPierre (C)	Canada	Los Angeles Kings	Montreal Junior Canadiens (OHA)
77	Alan Globensky (D)	Canada	Minnesota North Stars	Montreal Junior Canadiens (OHA)
78	Yvon Bilodeau (D)	Canada	Philadelphia Flyers	Estevan Bruins (WCHL)
79	Mike Ruest (D)	Canada	Toronto Maple Leafs	Cornwall Royals (QMJHL)
80	Bernie Doan (D)	Canada	St. Louis Blues	Calgary Centennials (WCHL)
81	Ross Butler (LW)	Canada	Montreal Canadiens	Winnipeg Jets (WCHL)
82	Jim Johnston (C)	Canada	Chicago Black Hawks	University of Wisconsin (WCHA)
83	Wayne Wood (G)	Canada	New York Rangers	Montreal Junior Canadiens (OHA)
84	Bob McMahon (D)	Canada	Boston Bruins	St Catharines Black Hawks (OHA)
^{Reference: "1971 NHL Amateur Draft hockeydraftcentral.com".}

=== Round seven ===
#	Player	Nationality	NHL team	College/junior/club team
85	Al Simmons (D)	Canada	California Golden Seals	Winnipeg Jets (WCHL)
86	Jim Nahrgang (D)	Canada	Detroit Red Wings	Michigan Technological University (WCHA)
87	Bill Green (D)	United States	Vancouver Canucks	University of Notre Dame (NCAA)
88	Doug Elliott (D)	Canada	Pittsburgh Penguins	Harvard University (ECAC)
89	Peter Harasym (LW)	Canada	Los Angeles Kings (from Buffalo)^{1}	Clarkson University (ECAC)
90	Norm Dube (LW)	Canada	Los Angeles Kings	Sherbrooke Castors (QMJHL)
91	Bruce Abbey (D)	Canada	Minnesota North Stars	Peterborough Petes (OHA)
92	Bobby Gerrard (RW)	Canada	Philadelphia Flyers	Regina Pats (WCHL)
93	Dale Smedsmo (LW)	United States	Toronto Maple Leafs	Bemidji State University (NAIA)
94	Dave Smith (D)	Canada	St. Louis Blues	Regina Pats (WCHL)
95	Peter Sullivan (C)	Canada	Montreal Canadiens	Oshawa Generals (OHA)
96	Doug Keeler (C)	Canada	New York Rangers (from Chicago)^{2}	Ottawa 67's (OHA)
97	Jean-Denis Royal (D)	Canada	New York Rangers	Saint-Jérôme Alouettes (QMJHL)
98	Steve Johnson (D)	Canada	Toronto Maple Leafs (from Boston)^{3}	Verdun Maple Leafs (QMJHL)
^{Reference: "1971 NHL Amateur Draft hockeydraftcentral.com".}

1. The Buffalo Sabres' seventh-round pick went to the Los Angeles Kings as the result of a trade on November 24, 1970 that sent Dick Duff and Eddie Shack to Buffalo in exchange for Buffalo's eight-round pick in 1971, Mike McMahon Jr. and this pick.
2. The Chicago Blackhawks' seventh-round pick went to the New York Rangers as the result of a trade on June 10, 1971 that sent cash to Chicago in exchange for this pick.
3. The Boston Bruins' seventh-round pick went to the Toronto Maple Leafs as the result of a trade on June 10, 1971 that sent cash to Boston in exchange for this pick.

=== Round eight ===
#	Player	Nationality	NHL team	College/junior/club team
99	Angus Beck (C)	Canada	California Golden Seals	Charlottetown Royals (NBSHL)
100	Bob Boyd (D)	Canada	Detroit Red Wings	Michigan State University (WCHA)
101	Norm Cherrey (RW)	Canada	Vancouver Canucks	University of Wisconsin (WCHA)
102	Bob Murphy (LW)	Canada	Vancouver Canucks (from Pittsburgh)^{1}	Cornwall Royals (QMJHL)
103	Lorne Stamler (LW)	Canada	Los Angeles Kings (from Buffalo)^{2}	Michigan Technological University (WCHA)
104	Rod Lyons (LW)	Canada	California Golden Seals (from Los Angeles)^{3}	Halifax Colonels (NSJHL)
105	Russ Friesen (C)	Canada	Minnesota North Stars	Hamilton Red Wings (OHA)
106	Jerome Mrazek (G)	Canada	Philadelphia Flyers	University of Minnesota Duluth (WCHA)
107	Bob Burns (D)	Canada	Toronto Maple Leafs	Royal Military College (CIAU)
108	Jim Collins (LW)	Canada	St. Louis Blues	Flin Flon Bombers (WCHL)
109	Gene Sobchuk (LW)	Canada	New York Rangers	Regina Pats (WCHL)
^{Reference: "1971 NHL Amateur Draft hockeydraftcentral.com".}

1. The Pittsburgh Penguins' eighth-round pick went to the Vancouver Canucks as the result of a trade on June 10, 1970 that sent this pick in exchange for Vancouver's promised to not take certain players in the expansion draft.
2. The Buffalo Sabres' eighth-round pick went to the Los Angeles Kings as the result of a trade on November 24, 1970 that sent Dick Duff and Eddie Shack to Buffalo in exchange for Buffalo's seventh-round pick in 1971 (Pete Harasym), Mike McMahon Jr. and this pick.
3. The Los Angeles Kings' eighth-round pick went to the California Golden Seals as the result of a trade on February 5, 1971 that sent Harry Howell to Los Angeles in exchange for cash and this pick.

=== Round nine ===
#	Player	Nationality	NHL team	College/junior/club team
110	Jim Ivison (D)	Canada	New York Rangers	Brandon Wheat Kings (WCHL)
^{Reference: "1971 NHL Amateur Draft hockeydraftcentral.com".}

=== Round ten ===
#	Player	Nationality	NHL team	College/junior/club team
111	Andre Peloffy (C)	Canada	New York Rangers	Rosemont National (QMJHL)
^{Reference: "1971 NHL Amateur Draft hockeydraftcentral.com".}

=== Round eleven ===
#	Player	Nationality	NHL team	College/junior/club team
112	Elston Evoy (C)	Canada	New York Rangers	Sault Ste. Marie Greyhounds (NOHA)
^{Reference: "1971 NHL Amateur Draft hockeydraftcentral.com".}

=== Round twelve ===
#	Player	Nationality	NHL team	College/junior/club team
113	Mike Antonovich (C)	United States	Minnesota North Stars	University of Minnesota (WCHA)
114	Gerry Lecomte (D)	Canada	New York Rangers	Sherbrooke Castors (QMJHL)
^{Reference: "1971 NHL Amateur Draft hockeydraftcentral.com".}

=== Round thirteen ===
#	Player	Nationality	NHL team	College/junior/club team
115	Wayne Forsey (LW)	Canada	New York Rangers	Swift Current Broncos (WCHL)
^{Reference: "1971 NHL Amateur Draft hockeydraftcentral.com".}

=== Round fourteen ===
#	Player	Nationality	NHL team	College/junior/club team
116	Bill Forrest (D)	Canada	New York Rangers	Hamilton Red Wings (OHA)
^{Reference: "1971 NHL Amateur Draft hockeydraftcentral.com".}

=== Round fifteen ===
#	Player	Nationality	NHL team	College/junior/club team
117	Richard Coutu (G)	Canada	Minnesota North Stars	Rosemont National (QMJHL)
^{Reference: "1971 NHL Amateur Draft hockeydraftcentral.com".}

= NHL All-Star team ·	= NHL All-Star ·	= NHL All-Star and NHL All-Star team ·	= Hall of Famers

== Draftees based on nationality ==
Rank	Country	Number
1	Canada	109
2	United States	8

== See also ==
- 1971–72 NHL season
- List of NHL players
