= Terry Clancy =

Canadian ice hockey player

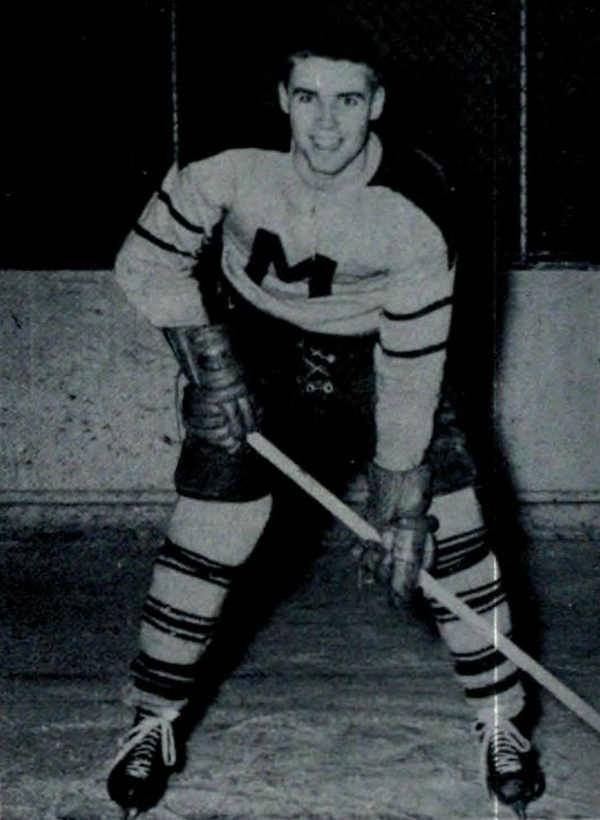
- at St. Michael's College, c. 1962
- Born: April 2, 1943 (age 83) Ottawa, Ontario, Canada
- Height: 5 ft 11 in (180 cm)
- Weight: 195 lb (88 kg; 13 st 13 lb)
- Position: Right wing
- Shot: Left
- Played for: California Golden Seals; Toronto Maple Leafs
- National team: Canada
- Playing career: 1963–1975

Terrance John Clancy (born April 2, 1943) is a Canadian former professional ice hockey player who played 93 games in the National Hockey League (NHL) between 1967 and 1973. He played with the Oakland Seals and the Toronto Maple Leafs. The rest of his career, which lasted from 1963 to 1975, was mainly spent in the minor leagues, as well as with an independent professional hockey team, the London Lions, during the 1973–74 season. He is the son of King Clancy, who played in the NHL between 1921 and 1937 and was elected to the Hockey Hall of Fame. Internationally Clancy played for Canada at the 1964 Winter Olympics.

== Playing career ==
Clancy played junior with the Toronto St. Michael's Majors of the Ontario Hockey Association. He helped St. Michael's win the 1961 Memorial Cup, the championship of junior hockey in Canada. After two seasons with St. Michael's Clancy moved to the Montreal Junior Canadiens for one season, followed by a stint with the Canadian national team. On his return from the 1964 Winter Olympics Clancy turned professional. playing 3 games with the Rochester Americans of the minor American Hockey League (AHL). Signed by the Toronto Maple Leafs of the National Hockey League (NHL) in October 1964, he stayed in the minor leagues and split 1964–65 between Rochester and the Tulsa Oilers of the Central Hockey League, and spent the 1965–66 season with Tulsa, but returned to Rochester and the AHL for 1966–67.

The NHL expanded in 1967, doubling in size, and Clancy was claimed by the newly-formed California/Oakland Seals (the team changed names midway through the season) in the expansion draft. He made his NHL debut in Seals first game, October 11, 1967 against the Philadelphia Flyers. He played seven games for the Seals that year, all at the start of the season. Reassigned to the minor leagues, Clancy spent the rest of the 1967–68 with the Vancouver Canucks of the minor Western Hockey League and the Buffalo Bisons of the AHL. After the season ended, on May 14, 1968, Clancy was traded back to Toronto.

Back with Tulsa for the 1968–69 season, Clancy played two games in the NHL with the Toronto Maple Leafs in December 1968. He played 52 games for the Maple Leafs in 1969–70, recording his first goal on December 6, 1969 against the Pittsburgh Penguins. Clancy finished with 6 goals and 11 points. The 1970–71 season saw Clancy spend time with both the Phoenix Roadrunners of the WHL and after being traded to the Montreal Canadiens on December 23, 1970, their AHL affiliate the Montreal Voyageurs of the AHL. He sitting out the 1971–72 season, and being traded back to Toronto on August 30, 1971, he played 32 games for Toronto in 1972–73, his final time in the NHL. On October 17, 1973 Clancy was traded once more, going to the Detroit Red Wings, though he spent the 1973–74 season split with the Albuquerque Six-Guns of the CHL and the London Lions, a British-based team that played across Europe that year. After a nine-game stint with the Virginia Wings of the AHL in 1974–75 Clancy retired from playing.

== Olympics ==
Clancy played for Canada in the 1964 Winter Olympics. He scored 1 goal and had 1 assist in 7 games played, but missed a medal as Canada finished in a 3-way tie and controversially ended up in 4th place.

== Personal life ==
Clancy was of Irish descent through his father. He is the great-uncle of Laura Stacey, professional ice hockey player for the Montreal Victoire, who is married to her Victoire teammate, Marie-Philip Poulin. He played for Team Canada at the 1964 Winter Olympics in Innsbruck, Austria.

== Career statistics ==
=== Regular season and playoffs ===
			Regular season					Playoffs
Season	Team	League	GP	G	A	Pts	PIM	GP	G	A	Pts	PIM
1960–61	Toronto St. Michael's Majors	OHA	38	2	3	5	30	20	2	3	5	16
1960–61	Toronto St. Michael's Majors	M-Cup	—	—	—	—	—	7	4	2	6	6
1961–62	Toronto St. Michael's Majors	OHA	32	4	14	18	16	12	6	3	9	20
1961–62	Toronto St. Michael's Majors	M-Cup	—	—	—	—	—	5	1	1	2	14
1962–63	Montreal Junior Canadiens	OHA	27	6	7	13	29	10	1	6	7	10
1963–64	Rochester Americans	AHL	3	0	0	0	0	—	—	—	—	—
1964–65	Rochester Americans	AHL	30	1	5	6	6	—	—	—	—	—
1964–65	Tulsa Oilers	CHL	33	10	10	20	18	12	4	1	5	14
1965–66	Tulsa Oilers	CHL	70	15	18	33	74	11	3	5	8	5
1966–67	Rochester Americans	AHL	72	14	24	38	51	10	0	2	2	4
1967–68	Buffalo Bisons	AHL	14	4	1	5	4	—	—	—	—	—
1967–68	Vancouver Canucks	WHL	46	6	9	15	10	—	—	—	—	—
1967–68	California/Oakland Seals	NHL	7	0	0	0	2	—	—	—	—	—
1968–69	Tulsa Oilers	CHL	47	5	13	18	24	5	1	0	1	2
1968–69	Toronto Maple Leafs	NHL	2	0	0	0	0	—	—	—	—	—
1969–70	Toronto Maple Leafs	NHL	52	6	5	11	31	—	—	—	—	—
1970–71	Phoenix Roadrunners	WHL	18	2	1	3	9	—	—	—	—	—
1970–71	Montreal Voyageurs	AHL	33	5	3	8	6	3	0	0	0	0
1972–73	Toronto Maple Leafs	NHL	32	0	1	1	6	—	—	—	—	—
1973–74	Albuquerque Six-Guns	CHL	19	4	0	4	21	—	—	—	—	—
1973–74	London Lions	Exhib	35	6	13	19	22	—	—	—	—	—
1974–75	Virginia Wings	AHL	9	0	0	0	0	—	—	—	—	—
AHL totals			161	24	33	57	67	13	0	2	2	4
NHL totals			93	6	6	12	39	—	—	—	—	—

=== International ===
Year	Team	Event	GP	G	A	Pts	PIM
1964	Canada	Oly	7	1	1	2	2
Senior totals			7	1	1	2	2

== Bibliography ==
- Diamond, Dan, ed. (2002), Total Hockey: The Official Encyclopedia of the National Hockey League, Second Edition, New York: Total Sports Publishing, ISBN 1-892129-85-X
- Terry Clancy Game Logs 1967–68, National Hockey League, 2020
- Terry Clancy Game Logs 1968–69, National Hockey League, 2020
- Terry Clancy Game Logs 1969–70, National Hockey League, 2020
