= Barry Boughner =

Canadian ice hockey player

- Born: January 29, 1948 (age 77); Delhi, Ontario, Canada
- Height: 5 ft 11 in (180 cm)
- Weight: 170 lb (77 kg; 12 st 2 lb)
- Position: Left wing
- Shot: Left
- Played for: Oakland Seals; California Golden Seals
- Playing career: 1968–1974

Barry Michael Boughner (born January 29, 1948) is a Canadian former professional ice hockey left winger. He played 20 National Hockey League games with the Oakland Seals/California Golden Seals between 1969 and 1971, going scoreless with 11 penalty minutes. He also played in the minor leagues, retiring in 1975.

Boughner served as head coach for the Niagara Falls Flyers of the Ontario Hockey Association for a portion of the 1979–80 season.

== Career statistics ==
=== Regular season and playoffs ===
			Regular season					Playoffs
Season	Team	League	GP	G	A	Pts	PIM	GP	G	A	Pts	PIM
1966–67	London Nationals	WOHL	42	1	7	8	11	6	1	2	3	6
1967–68	London Nationals	WOHL	52	15	19	34	43	5	2	1	3	0
1968–69	Des Moines Oak Leafs	IHL	58	19	13	32	34	—	—	—	—	—
1969–70	Oakland Seals	NHL	4	0	0	0	2	—	—	—	—	—
1969–70	Providence Reds	AHL	71	9	13	22	16	—	—	—	—	—
1970–71	California Golden Seals	NHL	16	0	0	0	9	—	—	—	—	—
1970–71	Providence Reds	AHL	21	1	0	1	4	—	—	—	—	—
1971–72	Des Moines Oak Leafs	IHL	66	14	19	33	83	3	1	1	2	2
1972–73	New Haven Nighthawks	AHL	63	9	17	26	14	—	—	—	—	—
1973–74	Albuquerque Six-Guns	CHL	62	11	14	25	19	—	—	—	—	—
1974–75	Brantford Alexanders	OHA Sr	12	3	4	7	15	—	—	—	—	—
AHL totals			155	19	30	49	34	—	—	—	—	—
IHL totals			124	33	32	65	117	3	1	1	2	2
NHL totals			20	0	0	0	11	—	—	—	—	—
