= Salem Rebels =

Salem Rebels may refer to:

- Salem Rebels (baseball), a baseball team from 1955–1971
- Salem Rebels (EHL), an ice hockey team from 1967–1970
