= Serge Beaudoin =

Canadian ice hockey player

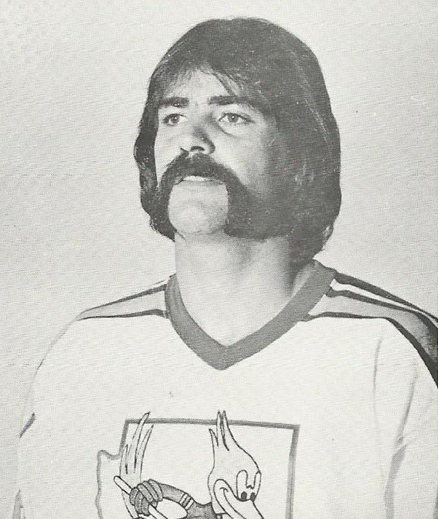
- Born: November 30, 1952 (age 73) Montreal, Quebec, Canada
- Height: 6 ft 2 in (188 cm)
- Weight: 215 lb (98 kg; 15 st 5 lb)
- Position: Defence
- Shot: Left
- Played for: Vancouver Blazers; Phoenix Roadrunners; Cincinnati Stingers; Birmingham Bulls; Atlanta Flames
- NHL draft: 103rd overall, 1972; Philadelphia Flyers
- Playing career: 1972–1981

Serge Beaudoin (born November 30, 1952) is a Canadian former professional ice hockey player who played 332 games in the World Hockey Association and three games in the National Hockey League. He played for the Phoenix Roadrunners, Cincinnati Stingers, Birmingham Bulls, Vancouver Blazers, and Atlanta Flames.

== Career statistics ==
			Regular season					Playoffs
Season	Team	League	GP	G	A	Pts	PIM	GP	G	A	Pts	PIM
1969–70	Laval Saints	QMJHL	38	2	15	17	178	—	—	—	—	—
1970–71	Trois-Rivières Ducs	QMJHL	56	8	33	41	201	11	0	7	7	41
1971–72	Trois-Rivières Ducs	QMJHL	61	17	50	67	242	5	0	1	1	59
1972–73	Roanoke Valley Rebels	EHL-Sr.	76	10	43	53	221	16	1	10	11	43
1973–74	Vancouver Blazers	WHA	26	1	11	12	37	—	—	—	—	—
1973–74	Roanoke Valley Rebels	SHL-Sr.	37	8	20	28	179	—	—	—	—	—
1974–75	Tulsa Oilers	CHL	37	6	31	37	139	2	0	0	0	8
1974–75	Vancouver Blazers	WHA	4	0	0	0	2	—	—	—	—	—
1975–76	Phoenix Roadrunners	WHA	76	0	21	21	102	5	1	0	1	10
1976–77	Phoenix Roadrunners	WHA	77	6	24	30	136	—	—	—	—	—
1977–78	Cincinnati Stingers	WHA	13	0	1	1	10	—	—	—	—	—
1977–78	Birmingham Bulls	WHA	64	8	25	33	105	5	1	0	1	46
1978–79	Binghamton Dusters	AHL	3	1	1	2	0	—	—	—	—	—
1978–79	Birmingham Bulls	WHA	72	5	21	26	127	—	—	—	—	—
1979–80	Atlanta Flames	NHL	3	0	0	0	0	—	—	—	—	—
1979–80	Birmingham Bulls	CHL	76	6	26	32	135	3	0	1	1	6
1980–81	Birmingham Bulls	CHL	7	0	3	3	12	—	—	—	—	—
NHL totals			3	0	0	0	0	—	—	—	—	—
WHA totals			332	20	103	123	519	10	2	0	2	56
