= Denis Meloche =

Canadian ice hockey player

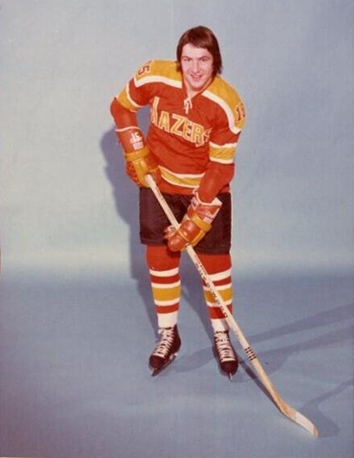
- Meloche in 1973 photo
- Born: June 19, 1952 (age 73) Montreal, Quebec, Canada
- Height: 5 ft 9 in (175 cm)
- Weight: 175 lb (79 kg; 12 st 7 lb)
- Position: Centre
- Shot: Left
- Played for: Philadelphia Blazers; Vancouver Blazers
- NHL draft: 134th overall, 1972; California Golden Seals
- Playing career: 1972–1978

Denis Meloche (born June 19, 1952) is a Canadian former professional ice hockey player who played in the World Hockey Association (WHA). Drafted in the ninth round of the 1972 NHL Amateur Draft by the California Golden Seals, Meloche opted to play in the WHA after being selected by the Miami Screaming Eagles in the WHA General Player Draft. He played parts of two seasons for the Blazers franchise — which had moved from Miami before their inaugural season — in Philadelphia and Vancouver. Aside from a nine-game stint with the Maine Mariners of the American Hockey League (AHL) he spent his final four professional seasons with the Salt Lake Golden Eagles of the Central Hockey League, where he was named a CHL Second Team All-Star in 1974–75.

As a youth, Meloche played in the 1963 and 1964 Quebec International Pee-Wee Hockey Tournaments with teammates Rick Lalonde and Rychard Campeau on minor ice hockey from Saint-Jean-de-Matha, Quebec and Ville-Émard in Montréal, and then also played in the 1965 tournament with Ville-Émard. Meloche's brother, Gilles Meloche, and nephew, Éric Meloche, both played in the National Hockey League.

== Career statistics ==
			Regular season					Playoffs
Season	Team	League	GP	G	A	Pts	PIM	GP	G	A	Pts	PIM
1970–71	Drummondville Rangers	QMJHL	60	31	45	76	121	6	5	2	7	11
1971–72	Drummondville Rangers	QMJHL	57	27	42	69	112	9	5	7	12	6
1972–73	Roanoke Valley Rebels	EHL	58	30	49	79	60	16	6	10	16	16
1972–73	Philadelphia Blazers	WHA	4	1	1	2	0	—	—	—	—	—
1973–74	Roanoke Valley Rebels	SHL	18	8	6	14	6	14	7	6	13	17
1973–74	Vancouver Blazers	WHA	41	6	13	19	18	—	—	—	—	—
1974–75	Salt Lake Golden Eagles	CHL	76	36	35	71	140	10	1	0	1	2
1975–76	Salt Lake Golden Eagles	CHL	75	21	59	80	83	5	0	1	1	8
1976–77	Salt Lake Golden Eagles	CHL	52	23	39	62	36	—	—	—	—	—
1977–78	Maine Mariners	AHL	9	1	1	2	2	—	—	—	—	—
1977–78	Salt Lake Golden Eagles	CHL	51	8	20	28	40	4	0	0	0	0
WHA totals			45	7	14	21	18	—	—	—	—	—
