= Richard Lemieux =

Canadian ice hockey player

- Born: April 19, 1951 (age 74) Témiscaming, Quebec, Canada
- Height: 5 ft 8 in (173 cm)
- Weight: 165 lb (75 kg; 11 st 11 lb)
- Position: Centre
- Shot: Left
- Played for: Vancouver Canucks; Kansas City Scouts; Atlanta Flames; Calgary Cowboys
- NHL draft: 39th overall, 1971; Vancouver Canucks
- Playing career: 1971–1977

Richard Bernard Lemieux (born April 19, 1951) is a Canadian former professional ice hockey player who played 274 games in the National Hockey League and 33 games in the World Hockey Association. He played for the Kansas City Scouts, Vancouver Canucks, Atlanta Flames, and Calgary Cowboys.

== Career statistics ==
=== Regular season and playoffs ===
			Regular season					Playoffs
Season	Team	League	GP	G	A	Pts	PIM	GP	G	A	Pts	PIM
1967–68	Thetford Mines Canadiens	QJAHL	44	28	32	60	—	7	5	8	13	7
1968–69	Montreal Junior Canadiens	OHA	51	10	28	38	51	14	6	12	18	6
1969–70	Montreal Junior Canadiens	OHA	50	29	43	72	75	16	10	16	26	6
1970–71	Montreal Junior Canadiens	OHA	15	11	23	34	35	4	2	6	8	5
1971–72	Vancouver Canucks	NHL	42	7	9	16	4	—	—	—	—	—
1971–72	Rochester Americans	AHL	34	12	12	24	30	—	—	—	—	—
1972–73	Vancouver Canucks	NHL	78	17	35	52	41	—	—	—	—	—
1973–74	Vancouver Canucks	NHL	72	5	17	22	23	—	—	—	—	—
1974–75	Kansas City Scouts	NHL	79	10	20	30	64	—	—	—	—	—
1975–76	Kansas City Scouts	NHL	2	0	0	0	0	—	—	—	—	—
1975–76	Nova Scotia Voyageurs	AHL	60	25	23	48	37	9	8	6	14	4
1975–76	Atlanta Flames	NHL	1	0	1	1	0	2	0	0	0	0
1976–77	Calgary Cowboys	WHA	33	6	11	17	9	—	—	—	—	—
WHA totals			33	6	11	17	9	—	—	—	—	—
NHL totals			274	39	82	121	132	2	0	0	0	0
