= Billy Orr (ice hockey) =

Canadian ice hockey player

- Born: June 12, 1948 (age 77) Porcupine, Ontario, Canada
- Height: 5 ft 10 in (178 cm)
- Weight: 180 lb (82 kg; 12 st 12 lb)
- Position: Defence
- Shot: Right
- Played for: WHA; Toronto Toros; AHL; Rochester Americans; Jacksonville Barons; Syracuse Eagles; EHL; New Haven Blades; Jacksonville Rockets; Syracuse Blazers; NAHL; Broome Dusters; SHL; Roanoke Valley Rebels
- NHL draft: Undrafted
- Playing career: 1968–1977

William Lindsay Orr (born June 12, 1948) is a Canadian former professional ice hockey defenceman.

== Career ==
During the 1973–74 season, Orr played 46 games in the World Hockey Association with the Toronto Toros. He later played with the Syracuse Eagles, Broome Dusters, and Roanoke Valley Rebels before retiring.

== Career statistics ==
=== Regular season and playoffs ===
			Regular season					Playoffs
Season	Team	League	GP	G	A	Pts	PIM	GP	G	A	Pts	PIM
1965–66	Kitchener Greenshirts	COJHL	Statistics Unavailable
1966–67	Kitchener Greenshirts	COJHL	Statistics Unavailable
1967–68	Kitchener Greenshirts	COJHL	Statistics Unavailable
1967–68	Kitchener Rangers	OHA	12	0	3	3	6	––	––	––	––	––
1968–69	New Haven Blades	EHL	64	23	35	58	123	10	2	2	4	26
1969–70	Rochester Americans	AHL	64	10	21	31	84	––	––	––	––	––
1969–70	Vancouver Canucks	WHL	4	0	0	0	0	––	––	––	––	––
1970–71	New Haven–Jacksonvil	EHL	50	16	20	36	86	––	––	––	––	––
1970–71	Rochester Americans	AHL	1	0	0	0	2	––	––	––	––	––
1971–72	Syracuse Blazers	EHL	68	13	30	43	128	17	4	5	9	18
1972–73	Syracuse Blazers	EHL	70	22	66	88	102	14	6	13	19	10
1973–74	Jacksonville Barons	AHL	26	3	9	12	10	––	––	––	––	––
1973–74	Toronto Toros	WHA	46	3	9	12	16	12	1	0	1	6
1974–75	Syracuse Eagles	AHL	64	10	19	29	118	––	––	––	––	––
1975–76	Broome County Dusters	NAHL	27	6	14	20	14	––	––	––	––	––
1975–76	Roanoke Valley Rebels	SHL	44	6	15	21	54	––	––	––	––	––
1976–77	Broome County Dusters	NAHL	71	6	35	41	43	10	2	2	4	10
WHA totals			46	3	9	12	16	12	1	0	1	6
