= Rick Lalonde =

Canadian ice hockey player

- Born: February 19, 1955 (age 71) Ottawa, Ontario, Canada
- Height: 6 ft 0 in (183 cm)
- Weight: 200 lb (91 kg; 14 st 4 lb)
- Position: Defence
- Shot: Right
- Played for: San Diego Mariners
- NHL draft: Undrafted
- WHA draft: 98th overall, 1975; San Diego Mariners
- Playing career: 1975–1976

Rick Lalonde (born February 19, 1955) is a Canadian former professional ice hockey player who played in the World Hockey Association (WHA). Lalonde played two games with the San Diego Mariners during the 1975–76 WHA season. He was drafted by the Mariners in the seventh round of the 1975 WHA Amateur Draft. As a youth, he and teammates Rychard Campeau and Denis Meloche played in the 1963 and 1964 Quebec International Pee-Wee Hockey Tournaments with minor ice hockey teams in Ville-Émard and Saint-Jean-de-Matha, Quebec.

== Career statistics ==
=== Regular season and playoffs ===
| | | | Regular season | | | | | Playoffs |
| Season | Team | League | GP | G | A | Pts | PIM | GP | G | A | Pts | PIM |
|---|---|---|---|---|---|---|---|---|---|---|---|---|
| 1972–73 | Kamloops Rockets | BCJHL | Statistics Unavailable |
| 1973–74 | Calgary Centennials | WCHL | 68 | 2 | 17 | 19 | 101 | — | — | — | — | — |
| 1974–75 | Calgary Centennials | WCHL | 69 | 9 | 40 | 49 | 136 | — | — | — | — | — |
| 1975–76 | Winston-Salem Polar Twins | SHL | 22 | 1 | 10 | 11 | 27 | — | — | — | — | — |
| 1975–76 | Tidewater Sharks | SHL | 30 | 2 | 10 | 12 | 13 | — | — | — | — | — |
| 1975–76 | Broome County Dusters | NAHL | 9 | 0 | 1 | 1 | 9 | — | — | — | — | — |
| 1975–76 | San Diego Mariners | WHA | 2 | 0 | 0 | 0 | 0 | — | — | — | — | — |
| WHA totals | | | 2 | 0 | 0 | 0 | 0 | — | — | — | — | — |
