= Jim Collins (ice hockey) =

Canadian ice hockey player

- Born: August 13, 1951 (age 74) Thompson, Manitoba, Canada
- Height: 5 ft 8 in (173 cm)
- Weight: 150 lb (68 kg; 10 st 10 lb)
- Position: Left wing
- Shot: Left
- Played for: IHL; Columbus Golden Seals; Toledo Hornets; CHL; Kansas City Blues
- NHL draft: 108th overall, 1971; St. Louis Blues
- Playing career: 1971–1973

Jim Collins (born August 13, 1951) is a Canadian former professional ice hockey player. He was selected by the St. Louis Blues in the 8th round (108th overall) of the 1971 NHL Amateur Draft.

Collins played major junior hockey with the Flin Flon Bombers of the Western Canada Hockey League. In 1971 Collins was drafted by the St. Louis Blues. He went on to play 130 games in the International Hockey League, mostly with the Toledo Hornets.
