= Dave Lucas (ice hockey) =

Canadian ice hockey player (1932–2025)

- Born: March 22, 1932 Downeyville, Ontario, Canada
- Died: January 16, 2025 (aged 92) Lindsay, Ontario, Canada
- Height: 6 ft 0 in (183 cm)
- Weight: 205 lb (93 kg; 14 st 9 lb)
- Position: Defence
- Shot: Left
- Played for: Detroit Red Wings
- Playing career: 1952–1969

David Charles Lucas (March 22, 1932 – January 16, 2025) was a Canadian professional ice hockey defenceman who played in one National Hockey League game for the Detroit Red Wings.

== Career ==
Lucas played in one National Hockey League game for the Detroit Red Wings during the 1962–63 season. The rest of his career, which lasted from 1952 to 1969, was mainly spent with the Johnstown Jets of the Eastern Hockey League. Lucas scouted for the Pittsburgh Penguins, the NHL Central Scouting Bureau, and the Chicago Blackhawks.

== Personal life and death ==
Lucas was married to Mona (nee Legault), who predeceased him in August 2023. They continued to live near Downeyville, a hamlet in the former Victoria County, along with Lindsay, Ontario, are now both part of the City of Kawartha Lakes, Ontario, whey they managed a farm. Later, they retired into Lindsay, and he died at the Ross Memorial Hospital on January 16, 2025, at the age of 92. In 1997, he was honoured locally as an inductee with the Lindsay District Sports Hall of Fame, along with former WHA player Bill Horton and 4 others, and located in the Lindsay Recreation Centre.

== Career statistics ==
=== Regular season and playoffs ===
			Regular season					Playoffs
Season	Team	League	GP	G	A	Pts	PIM	GP	G	A	Pts	PIM
1951–52	Lindsay Bears	OHA-B	—	—	—	—	—	—	—	—	—	—
1952–53	Washington Lions	EAHL	62	2	14	16	43	—	—	—	—	—
1953–54	Troy Bruins	IHL	63	5	15	20	129	3	0	0	0	4
1954–55	Troy Bruins	IHL	3	0	1	1	4	—	—	—	—	—
1954–55	Washington Lions	EHL	48	7	27	34	95	8	3	5	8	9
1955–56	Washington Lions	EHL	64	10	14	24	132	4	1	1	2	0
1956–57	Johnstown Jets	EHL	62	12	28	40	100	6	1	2	3	4
1957–58	Johnstown Jets	EHL	64	11	36	47	55	6	0	3	3	4
1958–59	Johnstown Jets	EHL	61	10	24	34	50	12	0	4	4	6
1959–60	Johnstown Jets	EHL	63	13	19	32	91	13	3	6	9	17
1960–61	Johnstown Jets	EHL	61	9	34	43	70	12	1	4	5	8
1961–62	Johnstown Jets	EHL	68	14	30	44	70	12	2	5	7	8
1962–63	Detroit Red Wings	NHL	1	0	0	0	0	—	—	—	—	—
1962–63	Portland Buckaroos	WHL	1	0	0	0	0	—	—	—	—	—
1962–63	Pittsburgh Hornets	AHL	1	0	1	1	0	—	—	—	—	—
1962–63	Johnstown Jets	EHL	68	15	33	48	52	3	0	1	1	6
1963–64	Portland Buckaroos	WHL	2	0	0	0	0	—	—	—	—	—
1963–64	Johnstown Jets	EHL	70	17	36	53	86	10	0	6	6	34
1964–65	Johnstown Jets	EHL	72	12	48	60	126	5	2	4	6	16
1965–66	Johnstown Jets	EHL	72	13	35	48	48	2	0	0	0	2
1965–66	Pittsburgh Hornets	AHL	5	0	0	0	2	—	—	—	—	—
1966–67	Johnstown Jets	EHL	72	16	41	57	72	5	0	2	2	2
1968–69	Salem Rebels	EHL	63	7	28	35	112	—	—	—	—	—
EHL totals			908	166	433	599	1159	98	13	43	56	116
NHL totals			1	0	0	0	0	—	—	—	—	—

== See also ==
- List of players who played only one game in the NHL
