= Rychard Campeau =

Canadian ice hockey player

- Born: April 9, 1952 (age 74) Montreal, Quebec, Canada
- Height: 6 ft 0 in (183 cm)
- Weight: 200 lb (91 kg; 14 st 4 lb)
- Position: Defence
- Shot: Right
- Played for: Philadelphia Blazers; Vancouver Blazers
- NHL draft: 53rd overall, 1972; Buffalo Sabres
- Playing career: 1972–1977

Rychard Campeau (born April 9, 1952) is a Canadian former professional ice hockey defenceman.

== Early life ==
Campeau was born in Montreal. As a youth, he and teammates Rick Lalonde and Denis Meloche played in the 1963 and 1964 Quebec International Pee-Wee Hockey Tournaments with minor ice hockey teams in Ville-Émard and Saint-Jean-de-Matha, Quebec.

== Career ==
Campeau was drafted by the Buffalo Sabres of the National Hockey League in the fourth round, 53rd overall, of the 1972 NHL entry draft. He played 82 regular-season games and four playoff games in the World Hockey Association with the Philadelphia Blazers and the Vancouver Blazers in the 1972–73 and 1973–74 seasons.

== Career statistics ==
| | | | Regular season | | | | | Playoffs |
| Season | Team | League | GP | G | A | Pts | PIM | GP | G | A | Pts | PIM |
|---|---|---|---|---|---|---|---|---|---|---|---|---|
| 1969–70 | Sorel Eperviers | QMJHL | 54 | 6 | 36 | 42 | 76 | 10 | 3 | 1 | 4 | 16 |
| 1970–71 | Sorel Eperviers | QMJHL | 62 | 21 | 40 | 61 | 98 | 7 | 3 | 2 | 5 | 14 |
| 1971–72 | Sorel Eperviers | QMJHL | 62 | 23 | 54 | 77 | 58 | 4 | 1 | 1 | 2 | 6 |
| 1972–73 | Philadelphia Blazers | WHA | 75 | 1 | 18 | 19 | 72 | 4 | 1 | 0 | 1 | 17 |
| 1973–74 | Roanoke Valley Rebels | SHL-Sr. | 63 | 16 | 39 | 55 | 56 | 19 | 4 | 5 | 9 | 16 |
| 1973–74 | Vancouver Blazers | WHA | 7 | 0 | 0 | 0 | 2 | — | — | — | — | — |
| 1974–75 | Philadelphia Firebirds | NAHL-Sr. | 72 | 13 | 37 | 50 | 98 | 3 | 1 | 2 | 3 | 0 |
| 1975–76 | Philadelphia Firebirds | NAHL-Sr. | 70 | 17 | 64 | 81 | 92 | 16 | 5 | 16 | 21 | 28 |
| 1976–77 | Philadelphia Firebirds | NAHL-Sr. | 66 | 9 | 37 | 46 | 73 | — | — | — | — | — |
| WHA totals | | | 82 | 1 | 18 | 19 | 74 | 4 | 1 | 0 | 1 | 17 |
