= Jack Chipchase =

Canadian ice hockey player and coach

- Born: April 5, 1945 (age 81) Seaforth, Ontario, Canada
- Height: 5 ft 11 in (180 cm)
- Weight: 205 lb (93 kg; 14 st 9 lb)
- Position: Defence
- Shot: Left
- Played for: Philadelphia Blazers
- Playing career: 1965–1979

Jack Chipchase (born April 5, 1945) is a Canadian former professional ice hockey player and coach who played in the World Hockey Association (WHA). He played part of the 1972–73 WHA season for the Philadelphia Blazers. He served as the head coach of the Roanoke Valley Rebels of the Southern Hockey League during the 1975–76 season.

== Career statistics ==
=== Regular season and playoffs ===
			Regular season					Playoffs
Season	Team	League	GP	G	A	Pts	PIM	GP	G	A	Pts	PIM
1961–62	Toronto Marlboros	OHA	25	1	2	3	0	—	—	—	—	—
1962–63	Toronto Marlboros	OHA	37	1	11	12	0	—	—	—	—	—
1963–64	Rochester Americans	AHL	4	0	0	0	2	—	—	—	—	—
1963–64	Toronto Marlboros	OHA	45	5	25	30	0	—	—	—	—	—
1964–65	Tulsa Oilers	CPHL	5	0	1	1	10	—	—	—	—	—
1964–65	Toronto Marlboros	OHA	50	9	20	29	0	—	—	—	—	—
1964–65	Victoria Maple Leafs	WHL	—	—	—	—	—	2	0	0	0	4
1965–66	Tulsa Oilers	CPHL	55	3	7	10	95	1	0	0	0	2
1965–66	Victoria Maple Leafs	WHL	7	0	0	0	29	—	—	—	—	—
1966–67	Omaha Knights	CPHL	57	4	6	10	108	—	—	—	—	—
1966–67	Vancouver Canucks	WHL	9	1	3	4	0	—	—	—	—	—
1967–68	Rochester Americans	AHL	6	0	0	0	4	—	—	—	—	—
1967–68	Memphis South Stars	CPHL	64	3	16	19	142	3	0	0	0	12
1968–69	Rochester Americans	AHL	41	1	7	8	61	—	—	—	—	—
1969–70	Rochester Americans	AHL	28	1	9	10	44	—	—	—	—	—
1969–70	Salem Rebels	EHL	45	7	19	26	95	—	—	—	—	—
1970–71	Roanoke Valley Rebels	EHL	61	2	30	32	92	5	0	1	1	4
1971–72	Roanoke Valley Rebels	EHL	73	5	18	23	108	6	0	0	0	0
1971–72	Greensboro Generals	EHL	—	—	—	—	—	2	0	0	0	0
1972–73	Roanoke Valley Rebels	EHL	66	8	35	43	119	15	1	5	6	20
1972–73	Philadelphia Blazers	WHA	4	0	0	0	2	—	—	—	—	—
1973–74	Roanoke Valley Rebels	SHL	70	6	25	31	115	14	1	5	6	22
1974–75	Philadelphia Firebirds	NAHL	69	7	22	29	100	4	0	0	0	4
1975–76	Roanoke Valley Rebels	SHL	9	1	1	2	12	2	0	0	0	2
1976–77	Lucan-Ilderton Jets	CSAHL	Statistics Unavailable
1977–78	Lucan-Ilderton Jets	CSAHL	21	3	8	11	37	—	—	—	—	—
1978–79	Lucan-Ilderton Jets	CSAHL	Statistics Unavailable
WHA totals			4	0	0	0	2	—	—	—	—	—
