= Jerry Trooien =

American ice hockey player

- Born: October 10, 1947 (age 78) Saint Paul, MN, USA
- Height: 6 ft 2 in (188 cm)
- Weight: 195 lb (88 kg; 13 st 13 lb)
- Position: Left wing
- Shot: Left
- Played for: Chicago Cougars (WHA); Binghamton Dusters (NAHL); Toledo Hornets (IHL); Albuquerque Six-Guns(CHL)
- NHL draft: Undrafted
- Playing career: 1972–1974

Jerold L. Trooien (born October 10, 1947) is an American real estate developer and former professional ice hockey player.

During the 1972–73 season, Trooien played two games in the World Hockey Association with the Chicago Cougars. He also played college hockey for the University of Minnesota Golden Gophers men's ice hockey team in 1966-67

Trooien later became a real estate developer. He announced a bid to run as an independent candidate in the 2018 United States Senate election in Minnesota

== Career statistics ==
=== Regular season and playoffs ===
			Regular season					Playoffs
Season	Team	League	GP	G	A	Pts	PIM	GP	G	A	Pts	PIM
1967–68	Minneapolis Midwest Federal	MN-ONJHL	Statistics Unavailable
1972–73	Chicago Cougars	WHA	2	0	0	0	0	—	—	—	—	—
1973–74	Toledo Hornets	IHL	21	1	2	3	6	2	0	0	0	0
1973–74	Albuquerque Six-Guns	CHL	5	0	0	0	2	—	—	—	—	—
1973–74	Broome County Dusters	NAHL	3	0	0	0	0	—	—	—	—	—
WHA totals			2	0	0	0	0	—	—	—	—	—
