= 1969–70 QMJHL season =

Canadian junior ice hockey season

Original logo of the QMJHL.

The 1969–70 QMJHL season was the first season in the history of the Quebec Major Junior Hockey League. Eleven teams formed the new league, ten from Quebec and one from Ontario. Eight teams came from the Quebec Junior Hockey League, the Drummondville Rangers, Quebec Remparts, Saint-Jérôme Alouettes, Shawinigan Bruins, Sherbrooke Castors, Sorel Éperviers, Trois-Rivières Ducs and Verdun Maple Leafs; two from the Metropolitan Montreal Junior Hockey League, the Rosemont National and Laval Saints; and the Cornwall Royals from the Central Junior A Hockey League. The teams played 56 games each in the schedule.

The Quebec Remparts finished first place in the regular season, and won the President's Cup, defeating the Saint-Jérôme Alouettes in the finals. The Remparts then defeated the P.E.I. Islanders from the Maritimes, then competed for the George Richardson Memorial Trophy, losing to the Montreal Junior Canadiens 3 games to 0 for the Eastern Canada title.

== Final standings ==
Note: GP = Games played; W = Wins; L = Losses; T = Ties; Pts = Points; GF = Goals for; GA = Goals against

East Division	GP	W	L	T	Pts	GF	GA
Quebec Remparts	56	37	18	1	75	323	248
Shawinigan Bruins	56	36	19	1	73	318	254
Drummondville Rangers	56	35	20	1	71	309	254
Sorel Éperviers	56	33	23	0	66	295	220
Trois-Rivières Ducs	56	27	29	0	54	320	280
Sherbrooke Castors	56	23	31	2	48	263	295

West Division	GP	W	L	T	Pts	GF	GA
Saint-Jérôme Alouettes	56	25	27	4	54	261	293
Cornwall Royals	56	24	31	1	49	223	255
Rosemont National	56	23	30	3	49	245	275
Verdun Maple Leafs	56	20	35	1	41	218	300
Laval Saints	56	18	38	0	36	203	304

- complete list of standings.

== Scoring leaders ==
Note: GP = Games played; G = Goals; A = Assists; Pts = Points; PIM = Penalties in Minutes

Player	Team	GP	G	A	Pts	PIM
Luc Simard	Trois-Rivières Ducs	56	90	84	174	76
Guy Lafleur	Quebec Remparts	56	103	67	170	105
Michel Archambault	Drummondville	56	69	83	152	161
Rich Leduc	Trois-Rivières Ducs	55	61	90	151	253
Mike Morton	Shawinigan Bruins	56	55	92	147	80
Paul Larose	Quebec / Trois-Rivières	57	52	80	132	66
Doug Moyes	Sorel Éperviers	55	53	79	132	129
Jacques Richard	Quebec Remparts	53	62	64	126	170
Serge Roch	Rosemont National	55	48	67	115	45
Serge Vezina	Rosemont National	54	45	69	114	82

- complete scoring statistics

== Playoffs ==
Guy Lafleur was the leading scorer of the playoffs with 43 points (25 goals, 18 assists).

Quarterfinals
E1	Québec	4
E3	Drummondville	2
E2	Shawinigan	1
E4	Sorel	4
W1	Saint-Jérôme	4
W3	Rosemont	0
W2	Cornwall	2
W4	Verdun	4

Semifinals
E1	Québec	4
E4	Sorel	1
W1	Saint-Jérôme	4
W4	Verdun	1

Finals
E1	Québec	4
W1	Saint-Jérôme	0

== All-star teams ==
First team

- Goaltender - Gilles Meloche, Verdun Maple Leafs
- Left defence - Larry O'Connor, Laval Saints
- Right defence - Jacques Lapierre, Shawinigan Bruins
- Left winger - Luc Simard, Trois-Rivières Ducs
- Centreman - Guy Lafleur, Quebec Remparts
- Right winger - Pierre Plante, Drummondville Rangers
- Coach - Maurice Filion, Quebec Remparts

Second team

- Goaltender - Richard Coutu, Rosemont National and Billy Smith, Cornwall Royals
- Left defence - Ronald Legault, Sorel Éperviers
- Right defence - Richard Campeau, Sorel Éperviers and Michel Ruest, Cornwall Royals
- Left winger - Michel Archambault, Drummondville Rangers
- Centreman - Richard Leduc, Trois-Rivières Ducs
- Right winger - Mike Morton, Shawinigan Bruins
- Coach - Claude Dolbec, Shawinigan Bruins

== Trophies and awards ==
Team

- President's Cup - Playoff Champions, Quebec Remparts
- Jean Rougeau Trophy - Regular Season Champions, Quebec Remparts
- Frank J. Selke Memorial Trophy - West Division Champions, Saint-Jérôme Alouettes

Player

- Jean Béliveau Trophy - Top Scorer, Luc Simard, Trois-Rivières Ducs
- Jacques Plante Memorial Trophy - Best GAA, Michel Deguise, Sorel Éperviers
- Michel Bergeron Trophy - Rookie of the Year, Serge Martel, Verdun Maple Leafs

== See also ==
- 1970 Memorial Cup
- 1970 NHL entry draft
- 1969–70 OHA season
- 1969–70 WCHL season
- George Richardson Memorial Trophy

Preceded by First season	QMJHL seasons	Succeeded by 1970–71 QMJHL season
