= Rick Cunningham (ice hockey) =

Canadian ice hockey player

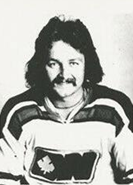
- Cunningham in 1972 photo
- Born: March 3, 1951 (age 75) Toronto, Ontario, Canada
- Height: 5 ft 11 in (180 cm)
- Weight: 185 lb (84 kg; 13 st 3 lb)
- Position: Defence
- Shot: Right
- Played for: Ottawa Nationals; Toronto Toros; Birmingham Bulls
- National team: Austria
- NHL draft: 51st overall, 1971; Toronto Maple Leafs
- Playing career: 1972–1986

Richard Glen Cunningham (born March 3, 1951) is a Canadian former professional ice hockey defenceman who played 323 games in the World Hockey Association (WHA).

== Early life ==
Cunningham was born in Toronto. As a youth, he played in the 1963 Quebec International Pee-Wee Hockey Tournament with the Toronto Shopsy's minor ice hockey team.

== Career ==
During his career, Cunningham played for the Ottawa Nationals, Toronto Toros, and Birmingham Bulls in the WHA. In 1977, he moved to Austria and subsequently played for the Austria men's national ice hockey team.

== Career statistics ==
=== Regular season and playoffs ===
			Regular season					Playoffs
Season	Team	League	GP	G	A	Pts	PIM	GP	G	A	Pts	PIM
1966–67	Dixie Beehives	MJBHL	Statistics Unavailable
1968–69	Peterborough Petes	OHA	54	10	13	23	55	—	—	—	—	—
1969–70	Peterborough Petes	OHA	23	8	11	19	40	—	—	—	—	—
1970–71	Peterborough Petes	OHA	55	17	42	59	119	—	—	—	—	—
1972–73	Ottawa Nationals	WHA	78	9	32	41	121	5	1	1	2	2
1973–74	Toronto Toros	WHA	75	2	19	21	88	11	0	4	4	31
1974–75	Toronto Toros	WHA	71	7	18	25	117	5	0	1	1	0
1975–76	Buffalo Norsemen	NAHL	1	1	0	1	2	—	—	—	—	—
1975–76	Toronto Toros	WHA	36	5	14	19	57	—	—	—	—	—
1976–77	Birmingham Bulls	WHA	63	0	8	8	75	—	—	—	—	—
1979–80	Vienna	Austria	40	28	45	73	103	—	—	—	—	—
1980–81	Austria	Intl	32	24	35	59	83	—	—	—	—	—
1981–82	Villach VSV	Austria	––	20	33	53	0	—	—	—	—	—
1985–86	Lustenau EHC	Austria	30	19	31	50	28	—	—	—	—	—
WHA totals			323	23	91	114	458	21	1	6	7	33
