= Bob LePage =

Canadian ice hockey player

- Born: May 7, 1946 (age 78); Quebec, Quebec, Canada
- Height: 5 ft 8 in (173 cm)
- Weight: 170 lb (77 kg; 12 st 2 lb)
- Position: Defence
- Shot: Left
- Played for: Houston Apollos; Des Moines Oak Leafs; Omaha Knights; Providence Reds; Baltimore Clippers; Albuquerque Six-Guns
- National team: Canada
- Playing career: 1968–1974

Bob LePage (born May 7, 1946) is a former professional ice hockey defenceman. He was a member of the Canada men's national ice hockey team during the 1969-70 season.

LePage played professionally in the American Hockey League, International Hockey League, and Central Hockey League between 1968 and 1974.

== Awards ==
The IHL awarded LePage the Governor's Trophy as the league's most outstanding defenceman during the 1970-71 season.
