= Roanoke Valley Rebels =

American minor league professional ice hockey team (1967–1976)

- City: Salem/Roanoke, Virginia
- League: EHL (1967–1973); SHL (1973–1976)
- Operated: 1967–1976
- Home arena: Salem Civic Center (1967–1976); Roanoke Civic Center (1971–1976)
- Colors: Blue, red, white
- Affiliates: NHL (1971–1972); WHA (1972–1976)

Franchise history
- 1967–1970: Salem Rebels
- 1970–1976: Roanoke Valley Rebels

Championships
- Playoff championships: 1973–74 (SHL)

The Roanoke Valley Rebels were a minor league professional ice hockey team based in the Roanoke Valley in Virginia. The team first played in the Eastern Hockey League and then joined the Southern Hockey League. The team was originally known as the Salem Rebels from 1967 to 1970, playing at the Salem Civic Center in Salem, Virginia. In 1971, the Rebels began splitting home games between Salem at the newer and larger Roanoke Civic Center in Roanoke.

The team name recalled Johnny Reb, a national personification of the Southern United States. The team logo was the Battle Flag of the Confederate States of America cut in the shape of a maple leaf. The Rebels were founding members of the Southern Hockey League in 1973 after the Eastern Hockey League ceased operations, and won the James Crockett Cup in 1974. After nine seasons of play, the team ceased operations in 1976.

== History ==
The first Salem Rebels game was played October 24, 1967, and Salem won 3–1 over the Jacksonville Rockets. Most of the players lived in a mobile home park near the Lakeside Amusement Park. Dave Lucas was coach the team's first coach, but struggled for the first two seasons and missed the playoffs both years. Colin Kilburn was brought in to coach in 1969, and improved the team to second place in the southern division, but lost in the first round of the playoffs. Kilburn coached the next two seasons to third-place finishes, and first round playoff losses. The Rebels affiliated with the Philadelphia Blazers in 1972 and the parent club assigned Gregg Pilling to coach. The Rebels finished first place in the southern division, won two playoff series, and finished runners-up in the 1973 EHL finals.

In 1973, the Rebels became a charter team in the Southern Hockey League due to travel costs to the multiple northern teams in the EHL for the 1973–74 season. Pilling stayed on as coach and the team roster featured eleven French Canadians, including the league's most valuable player, Claude Piche. The Rebels finished in first place in the regular season and won the James Crocket Cup in the playoffs. Pilling was named the SHL Coach of the Year for 1973–74. Bill Needham coached the 1974–75 season, and the team dropped to fourth place and a first round playoff loss.

Team operator and league commissioner, Gene Hawthorne, filed for bankruptcy protection for the team on July 14, 1975, and the Rebels were bought by local oil distributor Henry Brabham. Player-coach Jack Chipchase led the Rebels to a fourth-place finish in the 1975–76 season, and a first round playoff loss. The Rebels ceased operations after the season.

=== Major league affiliations ===
The Rebels were affiliated with the National Hockey League in the 1971–72 season, and with the World Hockey Association from 1972 to 1976.

| Years | Affiliations |
|---|---|
| 1971–72 | Philadelphia Flyers |
| 1972–73 | Philadelphia Blazers |
| 1973–74 | Vancouver Blazers |
| 1974–75 | Houston Aeros, Winnipeg Jets |
| 1975–76 | Calgary Cowboys, San Diego Mariners, Winnipeg Jets |

== Notable players ==
Notable players for the Salem Rebels (EHL 1967–1970), the Roanoke Valley Rebels (EHL 1970–1973), and the Roanoke Valley Rebels (SHL 1973–1977), who also played in either the National Hockey League or the World Hockey Association.

- Randy Andreachuk
- Yves Archambault
- Ron Ashton
- Jamie Bateman
- Serge Beaudoin
- John Bennett
- Michel Boudreau
- Brian Bradley
- Brian Bye
- Rychard Campeau
- Mike Chernoff
- Jack Chipchase
- Howie Colborne
- Pete Donnelly
- Guy Dufour
- George Gardner
- Jean-Claude Garneau
- Sam Gellard
- Merv Haney
- Derek Harker
- Pierre Henry
- Ted Hodgson
- Ralph Hopiavuori
- Ed Humphreys
- Dave Hutchison
- Jim Jones
- Jimmy Jones
- Joe Junkin
- Doug Kerslake
- Roger Lafreniere
- Camille LaPierre
- Dave Lucas
- Peter McNamee
- Denis Meloche
- John Migneault
- Wayne Mosdell
- Murray Myers
- Billy Orr
- Pierre Paiement
- Michel Plante
- Jan Popiel
- Rich Pumple
- Michel Rouleau
- Claude St. Sauveur
- Dave Schultz
- Gord Smith
- Danny Sullivan
- Jean Tétreault

== Results ==
As recorded in the Internet Hockey Database:

| Season | Lge | GP | W | L | T | Pts | Pct | GF | GA | PIM | Standing | Playoffs |
|---|---|---|---|---|---|---|---|---|---|---|---|---|
| 1967–68 | EHL | 72 | 11 | 53 | 8 | 30 | 0.208 | 211 | 432 | 880 | 6th, Southern | Did not qualify |
| 1968–69 | EHL | 72 | 24 | 45 | 3 | 51 | 0.354 | 240 | 321 | 786 | 5th, Southern | Did not qualify |
| 1969–70 | EHL | 74 | 37 | 27 | 10 | 84 | 0.568 | 279 | 266 | 1272 | 2nd, Southern | Lost in round 1 |
| 1970–71 | EHL | 74 | 31 | 34 | 9 | 71 | 0.480 | 257 | 303 | 1071 | 3rd, Southern | Lost in round 1 |
| 1971–72 | EHL | 73 | 30 | 33 | 10 | 70 | 0.479 | 241 | 266 | 968 | 3rd, Southern | Lost in round 1 |
| 1972–73 | EHL | 76 | 40 | 25 | 11 | 91 | 0.599 | 345 | 276 | 1629 | 1st, Southern | Lost in finals |
| 1973–74 | SHL | 72 | 53 | 19 | 0 | 106 | 0.736 | 366 | 244 | 1458 | 1st, SHL | Won championship |
| 1974–75 | SHL | 72 | 29 | 41 | 2 | 60 | 0.417 | 296 | 304 | 1037 | 4th, SHL | Lost in round 1 |
| 1975–76 | SHL | 72 | 29 | 28 | 15 | 73 | 0.507 | 239 | 238 | 1224 | 4th, SHL | Lost in round 1 |
| TOTALS | EHL | 441 | 173 | 217 | 51 | 397 | 0.450 | 1573 | 1864 | 6606 | 1 division title | 1 runner-up |
| TOTALS | SHL | 216 | 111 | 88 | 17 | 239 | 0.553 | 901 | 786 | 3719 | 1 league title | 1 championship |
