= Michel Archambault =

Canadian ice hockey player

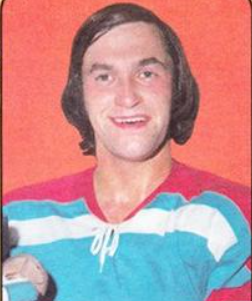
- Archambault in 1972-73 card
- Born: September 27, 1950 Saint-Hyacinthe, Quebec
- Died: May 23, 2018 (aged 67) Saint-Hyacinthe, Quebec
- Height: 5 ft 8 in (173 cm)
- Weight: 160 lb (73 kg; 11 st 6 lb)
- Position: Left wing
- Shot: Left
- Played for: Quebec Nordiques; Chicago Black Hawks; VEU Feldkirch
- NHL draft: 28th overall, 1970; Chicago Black Hawks
- Playing career: 1970–1978

Michel Joseph Archambault (September 27, 1950 – May 23, 2018) was a Canadian ice hockey left winger. He played 57 games in the World Hockey Association with the Quebec Nordiques during the 1972–73 season and 3 games in the National Hockey League with the Chicago Black Hawks during the 1976–77 season. The rest of his career, which lasted from 1970 to 1978, was mainly spent in the minor leagues.

== Career ==
Archambault played in the 1962 Quebec International Pee-Wee Hockey Tournament with his St. Hyancinthe youth team. He began his major junior career with the Quebec Major Junior Hockey League Drummondville Rangers in 1969. He spent most of his career with the Dallas Black Hawks, with one year with the Quebec Nordiques of the World Hockey Association and one year with the Maine Nordiques of the North American Hockey League. He also played three games for the Chicago Black Hawks during the 1976–77 NHL season. Archambault spent one year as an assistant coach for the Saint-Hyacinthe Laser of the Quebec Major Junior Hockey League in the 1990s. He died in 2018 at the age of 67.

== Career statistics ==
=== Regular season and playoffs ===
			Regular season					Playoffs
Season	Team	League	GP	G	A	Pts	PIM	GP	G	A	Pts	PIM
1966–67	Drummondville Rangers	QJAHL	—	—	—	—	—	3	1	1	2	12
1967–68	Drummondville Rangers	QJAHL	50	23	41	64	66	10	7	8	15	14
1968–69	Drummondville Rangers	QJAHL	—	—	—	—	—	—	—	—	—	—
1969–70	Drummondville Rangers	QMJHL	56	69	83	152	161	6	6	8	14	19
1969–70	Drummondville Rangers	M-Cup	—	—	—	—	—	3	1	3	4	6
1970–71	Dallas Black Hawks	CHL	61	17	17	34	56	10	5	2	7	10
1971–72	Dallas Black Hawks	CHL	65	31	26	57	115	12	6	6	12	14
1972–73	Quebec Nordiques	WHA	57	12	25	37	36	—	—	—	—	—
1973–74	Maine Nordiques	NAHL	72	43	65	108	83	8	1	7	8	0
1974–75	Dallas Black Hawks	CHL	70	26	40	66	49	8	4	2	6	8
1975–76	Dallas Black Hawks	CHL	76	26	47	73	41	10	2	2	4	2
1976–77	Chicago Black Hawks	NHL	3	0	0	0	0	—	—	—	—	—
1976–77	Dallas Black Hawks	CHL	72	28	45	73	60	5	0	3	3	0
1977–78	VEU Feldkirch	AUT	19	18	9	27	70	—	—	—	—	—
WHA totals			52	12	25	37	36	—	—	—	—	—
NHL totals			3	0	0	0	0	—	—	—	—	—
