= Albuquerque Six-Guns =

- City: Albuquerque, New Mexico
- League: Central Hockey League
- Operated: 1973–1974
- Home arena: Tingley Coliseum
- Affiliates: Kansas City Scouts

Championships
- Regular season titles: 0
- Division titles: 0
- Conference titles: 0
- Adams Cups: 0

The Albuquerque Six-Guns were a professional ice hockey team playing in Albuquerque, New Mexico, USA. They were in the Central Hockey League in the 1973-74 season only. They played in the Tingley Coliseum.

They were set up as a farm team of the Kansas City Scouts but that team did not enter the National Hockey League until the following season. The Six-Guns were forced to look to other National Hockey League teams for players.

Coached by John Choyce, they finished the 1973-74 season with a record of 16-54-16-48 189-263. They finished in 6th place and were out of playoffs.

== Player roster ==
Note: No. = Jersey Number; GP = Games played; G = Goals; A = Assists; Pts = Points; PIM = Penalty minutes

No.	Nationality	Player	Position	Regular season				
No.	Nationality	Player	Position	GP	G	A	Pts	PIM
8	Canada	Ken Ireland	C	65	19	33	52	56
9	Canada	Ken Davidson	RW	65	24	25	49	59
18	Canada	Chris Hayes	LW	71	20	28	48	118
17	Canada	Steve Langdon	RW	67	21	13	34	16
12	Canada	Paul Raymer	F	69	14	20	34	57
7	Canada	Alex Kogler	LW	62	14	16	30	23
14	Canada	Dale Yutsyk	LW	56	14	15	29	76
19	Canada	Morris Stefaniw	C	41	7	22	29	24
4	Canada	Bob LePage	D	60	10	18	28	50
11	Canada	Ron Homenuke	F	14	12	15	27	39
10	Canada	Barry Boughner	RW	62	11	14	25	19
2	Canada	Larry O'Connor	D	72	5	16	21	167
20	Canada	Dwayne Pentland	D	63	0	19	19	57
	Canada	Gary Gresdal	C	22	2	9	11	52
	Canada	Nick Polano	D	25	1	9	10	52
3	Canada	Rene Levasseur	D	7	2	7	9	20
	Canada	Alain Lebrecque	C	25	3	3	6	2
	Canada	Jeff Hunt	LW	9	1	5	6	2
6	Canada	Brian Molvik	D	40	0	5	5	122
16	Canada	Terry Clancy	RW	19	4	0	4	21
5	Canada	Wayne Elder	D	52	1	3	4	33
	Canada	Scott Smith	LW	19	1	2	3	17
	Canada	Bob Craig	D	12	0	2	2	23
1	Canada	Ray Reeson	G	56	0	1	1	14
	Canada	Dave Hainsworth	G	1	0	0	0	0
30	Canada	Clay Hebenton	G	1	0	0	0	0
	United States	Bob Vroman	G	1	0	0	0	0
	Canada	Rene Villemure	F	2	0	0	0	5
	Canada	Pat McCool	LW	3	0	0	0	0
	United States	Jerry Trooien	LW	5	0	0	0	2
	Canada	Wayne Wood	G	14	0	0	0	0
