= Neil Komadoski (ice hockey, born 1951) =

Canadian ice hockey defenceman

- Born: November 5, 1951 (age 73); Winnipeg, Manitoba, Canada
- Height: 6 ft 2 in (188 cm)
- Weight: 200 lb (91 kg; 14 st 4 lb)
- Position: Defence
- Shot: Left
- Played for: Los Angeles Kings; St. Louis Blues
- NHL draft: 48th overall, 1971; Los Angeles Kings
- Playing career: 1971–1981

Neil George Komadoski (born November 5, 1951) is a Canadian former National Hockey League defenceman.

== Career ==
Komadoski was drafted in the fourth round, 48th overall, of the 1971 NHL Amateur Draft by the Los Angeles Kings. He played in 501 NHL games, scoring 16 goals and 76 assists and recording 632 penalty minutes. He also appeared in 23 playoff games with the Kings, tallying two assists and recording 47 penalty minutes.

== Personal life ==
Komadoski is the father of current Vancouver Canucks scout and former player Neil Komadoski Jr.

== Career statistics ==
			Regular season					Playoffs
Season	Team	League	GP	G	A	Pts	PIM	GP	G	A	Pts	PIM
1968–69	Winnipeg Jets	WCHL	58	2	8	10	83	7	0	0	0	0
1969–70	Winnipeg Jets	WCHL	53	7	10	17	104	14	5	3	8	72
1970–71	Winnipeg Jets	WCHL	52	15	24	39	116	12	6	5	11	15
1971–72	Springfield Kings	AHL	64	7	20	27	87	5	0	0	0	8
1972–73	Los Angeles Kings	NHL	62	1	8	9	67	—	—	—	—	—
1973–74	Los Angeles Kings	NHL	68	2	4	6	43	2	0	0	0	12
1974–75	Los Angeles Kings	NHL	75	4	12	16	69	3	0	0	0	2
1975–76	Los Angeles Kings	NHL	80	3	15	18	165	9	0	0	0	18
1976–77	Los Angeles Kings	NHL	68	3	9	12	109	9	0	2	2	15
1977–78	Los Angeles Kings	NHL	25	0	6	6	24	—	—	—	—	—
1977–78	Springfield Indians	AHL	5	0	1	1	6	—	—	—	—	—
1977–78	St. Louis Blues	NHL	33	2	8	10	73	—	—	—	—	—
1978–79	St. Louis Blues	NHL	42	1	2	3	0	—	—	—	—	—
1978–79	Salt Lake Golden Eagles	CHL	23	0	2	2	36	—	—	—	—	—
1979–80	St. Louis Blues	NHL	49	0	12	12	52	—	—	—	—	—
1980–81	Salt Lake Golden Eagles	CHL	12	0	3	3	12	—	—	—	—	—
1980–81	Oklahoma City Stars	CHL	28	0	10	10	20	—	—	—	—	—
NHL totals			502	16	76	92	602	23	0	2	2	47

== Awards and achievements ==
- “Honoured Member” of the Manitoba Hockey Hall of Fame
