= Mike McNamara (ice hockey) =

Canadian ice hockey player

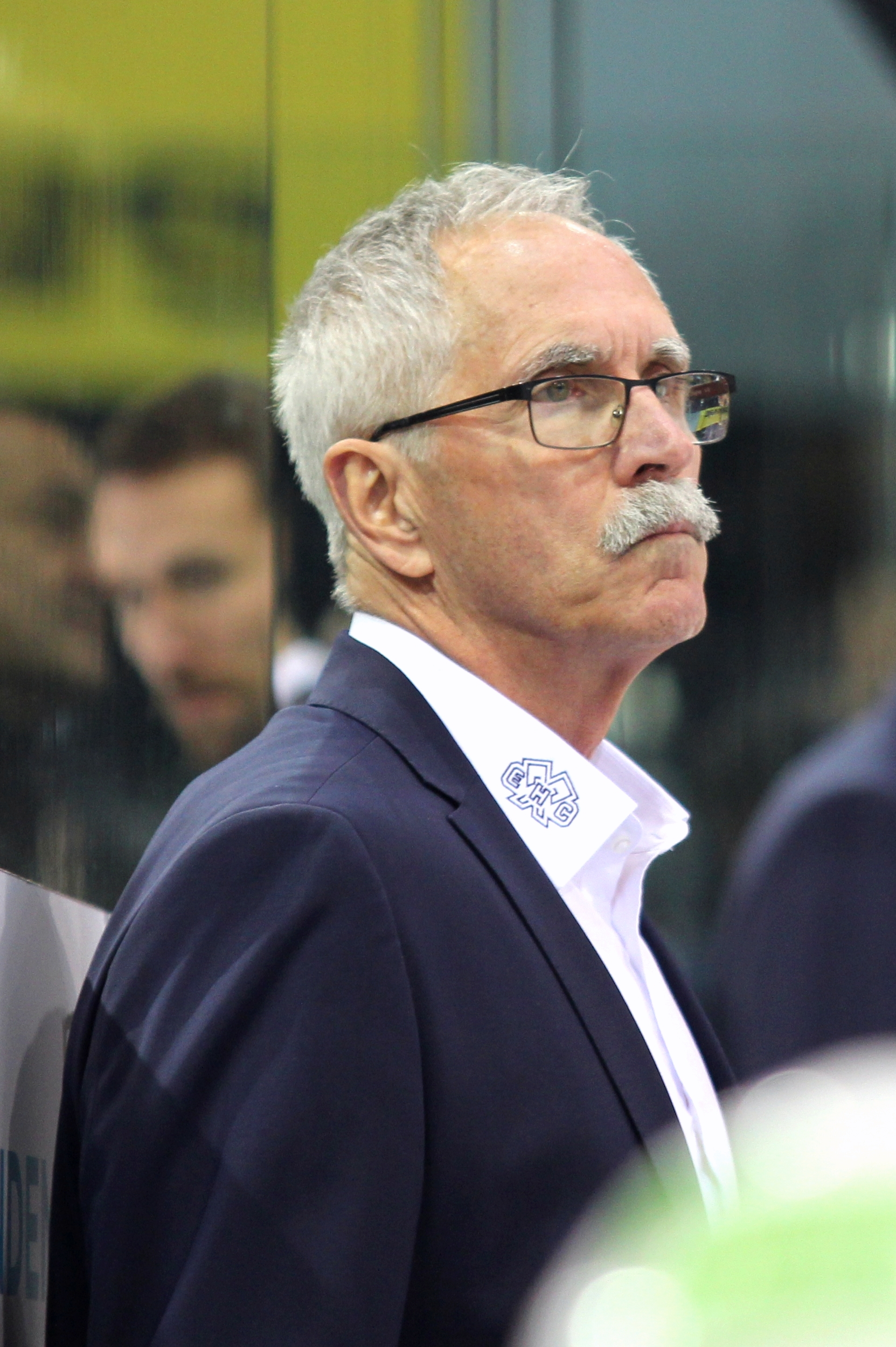
- Born: March 28, 1949 (age 77) Montreal, Quebec, Canada
- Height: 5 ft 9 in (175 cm)
- Weight: 175 lb (79 kg; 12 st 7 lb)
- Position: Defence
- Shot: Left
- Played for: Rhode Island Eagles; Quebec Nordiques; Maine Nordiques; HC Lugano
- NHL draft: Undrafted
- Playing career: 1972–1987

Mike McNamara (born March 28, 1949) is a Canadian former professional ice hockey defenceman.

During the 1972–73 season, McNamara played 19 games in the World Hockey Association with the Quebec Nordiques.

He briefly coached EHC Biel of the National League (NL) from November 2016 to November 2017, when he was fired following bad results.

== Career statistics ==
=== Regular season and playoffs ===
			Regular season					Playoffs
Season	Team	League	GP	G	A	Pts	PIM	GP	G	A	Pts	PIM
1971–72	Sir George Williams University	CIAU	Statistics Unavailable
1972–73	Rhode Island Eagles	EHL	39	9	14	23	19	3	0	0	0	15
1972–73	Quebec Nordiques	WHA	19	0	0	0	5	—	—	—	—	—
1973–74	Maine Nordiques	NAHL	37	3	19	22	11	8	1	5	6	2
1986–87	Lugano	Swiss–A	––	1	0	1	0	—	—	—	—	—
WHA totals			19	0	0	0	5	—	—	—	—	—
