= Neil Komadoski (ice hockey, born 1982) =

Neil Komadoski Jr.
- Born: February 10, 1982 (age 44) Chesterfield, Missouri, U.S.
- Height: 6 ft 1 in (185 cm)
- Weight: 206 lb (93 kg; 14 st 10 lb)
- Position: Defense
- Shot: Left
- Played for: Binghamton Senators; Peoria Rivermen; Alaska Aces
- NHL draft: 81st overall, 2001; Ottawa Senators
- Playing career: 2004–2008

Neil Grant Komadoski Jr. (born February 10, 1982, in Chesterfield, Missouri) is a Canadian-American professional ice hockey scout and former player. He was drafted in the third round, 81st overall, by the Ottawa Senators in the 2001 NHL entry draft. He is the son of former Los Angeles King and St. Louis Blues player Neil Komadoski.

After playing four seasons with Notre Dame, Komadoski made his professional debut with Ottawa's American Hockey League farm club, the Binghamton Senators, at the end of the 2003–04 season. After three full seasons in Binghamton, Komadoski was invited to the training camp of the St. Louis Blues, who eventually assigned him to their AHL affiliate, the Peoria Rivermen. After the 2007–08 season Komadoski had to retire due to a knee injury.

== Early life ==
Neil Komadoski Jr. was born in Chesterfield, Missouri, in 1982. His father Neil Sr. played professional hockey and his mother Lauren was a stay at home mom. He has one sister Kelly who was an excellent figure skater until she injured her foot and could no longer compete. Growing up he lived and breathed hockey. He played for the St. Louis AAA Amateur Blues where his father coached him. He went on to high school where he attended two years at Chaminade College Preparatory in St. Louis. After his sophomore year he lived with a host family in Ann Arbor, Michigan where he continued his dream and hockey career. He graduated from Pioneer High school. As a sixteen-year-old in 1998-99 he was playing on the USA 18 and under National team in the North American Hockey League. Here he played 49 games and scored 3 goals with 11 assists which tallied a total of 14 points on the season. The following season he played for the US Junior National team in the United States Hockey League. He played in 50 games and hit the back of the net 7 times while helping with 8 to give him a total of 15 points.

== University of Notre Dame ==
Komadoski was recruited by several universities but chose to attend the University of Notre Dame which played in the Central Collegiate Hockey Association. As a freshman, he scored 2 goals and had 5 assists. His rookie season got off to a slow start due to a shoulder injury in just the second game of the season and he missed nine games. His first career goal came against Bowling Green. As a sophomore, he played in all 38 games and scored just 2 goals and had 9 assists for 11 points. This is the year he was drafted but chose to stay in college and get an education before playing professional ice hockey. His junior season he picked up his game. While playing in all 40 games he led the Irish defenseman in scoring with a goal and 23 assists. Also his during his junior year, he was invited to the NCAA Leadership Conference held in Lake Buena Vista, Florida. This is one of the largest non-competitive gatherings of NCAA student-athletes. The conference is designed to enhance student-athletes' leadership and communication skills and to enable them to become more effective leaders and motivators when they return to their campuses. In his final season as a member of the Fighting Irish, Komadoski played in 39 games and scored 5 goals and had 10 helpers for 15 points. He was not only an outstanding athlete he also excelled in the classroom and was named to the Dean’s list twice. Also he was selected as one of 14 nominees for the College Hockey Humanitarian Award as a senior.

== Professional career ==
At the end of Neil’s senior season, he made his professional debut with the AHL Binghamton Senators, playing three games to finish the 2003-04 season. In his first full professional season, Komadoski played in 36 games that season, scoring two goals and adding one assist as a rookie. In the 2005-06 season Neil played in 41 games and tallied 5 assists but failed to score. He also added 71 penalty minutes. The following season which was the 2006-07 season he dressed out for 68 games. He scored 3 goals and had 4 assists which gave him a total of 7 points on the year. Over the years he had been progressing and hoping for a chance to make it to the NHL. After the 06-07 season ended he was a free agent and he signed a one-year contract with his hometown St. Louis Blues. In the 2007-08 he only played in three games with the Peoria Rivermen, the Blues affiliate in the AHL, due to a knee injury that would end his hockey playing career.

== Post-playing career ==
Komadoski was hired as an NHL scout by the Vancouver Canucks in 2010. On June 30, 2026, Komadoski was hired by the Buffalo Sabres to serve as the team's assistant director of pro scouting.

== Career statistics ==
=== Regular season and playoffs ===
			Regular season					Playoffs
Season	Team	League	GP	G	A	Pts	PIM	GP	G	A	Pts	PIM
1998–99	US NTDP U18	NAHL	49	3	11	14	222	—	—	—	—	—
1999–2000	US NTDP Juniors	USHL	50	7	8	15	202	—	—	—	—	—
1999–2000	US NTDP U18	NAHL	1	1	0	1	0	—	—	—	—	—
2000–01	University of Notre Dame	CCHA	30	2	5	7	106	—	—	—	—	—
2001–02	University of Notre Dame	CCHA	37	2	9	11	100	—	—	—	—	—
2002–03	University of Notre Dame	CCHA	40	1	23	24	46	—	—	—	—	—
2003–04	University of Notre Dame	CCHA	39	5	15	20	48	—	—	—	—	—
2003–04	Binghamton Senators	AHL	3	0	0	0	2	1	0	0	0	0
2004–05	Binghamton Senators	AHL	36	2	1	3	68	—	—	—	—	—
2005–06	Binghamton Senators	AHL	41	0	5	5	71	—	—	—	—	—
2006–07	Binghamton Senators	AHL	68	3	4	7	81	—	—	—	—	—
2007–08	Peoria Rivermen	AHL	3	0	1	1	2	—	—	—	—	—
2007–08	Alaska Aces	ECHL	5	0	1	1	8	—	—	—	—	—
AHL totals			151	5	11	16	224	1	0	0	0	0

=== International ===
Year	Team	Event	GP	G	A	Pts	PIM
2000	United States	WJC18	6	0	2	2	12
Junior totals			6	0	2	2	12

Awards and achievements
Preceded by Mike Betz	Ilitch Humanitarian Award; 2003-04	Succeeded by Bo Cheesman
