= Jean Payette =

Canadian ice hockey player

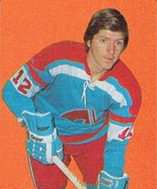
- Payette in 1972-73 card
- Born: March 29, 1946 (age 80) Cornwall, Ontario, Canada
- Height: 6 ft 0 in (183 cm)
- Weight: 170 lb (77 kg; 12 st 2 lb)
- Position: Centre
- Shot: Left
- Played for: Quebec Nordiques
- Playing career: 1965–1975

Jean Payette (born March 29, 1946) is a Canadian retired professional ice hockey forward. He played 112 games in the World Hockey Association with the Quebec Nordiques.

== Career statistics ==
=== Regular season and playoffs ===
			Regular season					Playoffs
Season	Team	League	GP	G	A	Pts	PIM	GP	G	A	Pts	PIM
1965–66	Cornwall Royals	CJHL	Statistics unavailable
1966–67	Tulsa Oilers	CPHL	59	8	10	18	18	—	—	—	—	—
1967–68	Tulsa Oilers	CPHL	64	19	31	50	19	10	3	5	8	4
1968–69	Phoenix Roadrunners	WHL	6	2	1	3	4	—	—	—	—	—
1970–71	Phoenix Roadrunners	WHL	5	0	2	2	2	—	—	—	—	—
1970–71	Tulsa Oilers	CHL	53	15	25	40	50	—	—	—	—	—
1971–72	Tulsa Oilers	CHL	72	33	64	97	44	13	7	8	15	4
1972–73	Quebec Nordiques	WHA	71	15	29	44	46	—	—	—	—	—
1973–74	Quebec Nordiques	WHA	41	4	11	15	6	—	—	—	—	—
1973–74	Maine Nordiques	NAHL	16	5	14	19	11	8	4	1	5	2
1974–75	Richmond Robins	AHL	41	10	27	37	28	7	4	2	6	4
WHA totals			112	19	40	59	52	—	—	—	—	—
