= Jean-Claude Garneau =

Canadian ice hockey player

- Born: October 10, 1943 (age 82) Sainte-Foy, Quebec, Canada
- Height: 5 ft 8 in (173 cm)
- Weight: 160 lb (73 kg; 11 st 6 lb)
- Position: Right wing
- Shot: Left
- Played for: Quebec Nordiques (WHA)
- NHL draft: Undrafted
- Playing career: 1969–1976

Jean-Claude Garneau (born October 10, 1943) is a Canadian retired ice hockey forward who played 17 games in the World Hockey Association (WHA) for the Quebec Nordiques during the 1974–75 WHA season.

Garneau played with the Gander Flyers in 1965, ultimately playing 180 games with the team, which won the Herder Memorial Trophy as the best senior ice hockey champion team of the Newfoundland and Labrador province in 1969. He also played for the Victoriaville Tigers, where he won the Allan Cup in 1968. In 2014, he was inducted into the Newfoundland and Labrador Hockey Hall of Fame.

Garneau played 17 games in the professional leagues with the World Hockey Association for the Quebec Nordiques. In his later years, he was noted to wear a team ring with the Nordiques logo on it and attended a select number of exhibition games hosted in Quebec City.

== Career statistics ==
=== Regular season and playoffs ===
			Regular season					Playoffs
Season	Team	League	GP	G	A	Pts	PIM	GP	G	A	Pts	PIM
1969–70	Salem Rebels	EHL	58	17	32	49	58	4	2	0	2	4
1971–72	Roanoke Valley Rebels	EHL	18	3	5	8	45	6	3	2	5	30
1974–75	Maine Nordiques	NAHL	16	7	2	9	4	—	—	—	—	—
1974–75	Quebec Nordiques	WHA	17	0	5	5	27	—	—	—	—	—
1975–76	Maine Nordiques	NAHL	31	7	14	21	140	—	—	—	—	—
WHA totals			17	0	5	5	27	—	—	—	—	—
