= Pierre Plante =

Canadian ice hockey player (1951–2026)

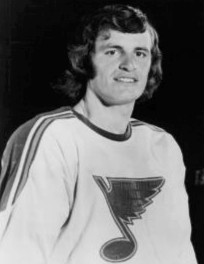
- Plante in 1973
- Born: May 14, 1951 Salaberry-de-Valleyfield, Quebec, Canada
- Died: September 27, 2026 (aged 75) Salaberry-de-Valleyfield, Quebec, Canada
- Height: 6 ft 1 in (185 cm)
- Weight: 180 lb (82 kg; 12 st 12 lb)
- Position: Right wing
- Shot: Right
- Played for: Philadelphia Flyers; St. Louis Blues; Chicago Black Hawks; New York Rangers; Quebec Nordiques
- NHL draft: 9th overall, 1971; Philadelphia Flyers
- Playing career: 1971–1980

Pierre Renald Plante (May 14, 1951 – September 27, 2026) was a Canadian professional ice hockey player who played 599 National Hockey League (NHL) games for the Philadelphia Flyers, St. Louis Blues, Chicago Black Hawks, New York Rangers and Quebec Nordiques. He was featured in the 1979 Stanley Cup Final with the Rangers.

Plante had a reputation as a durable, flashy winger who rarely missed a game through injury. He spent a majority of his professional career with St. Louis. Plante was born in Salaberry-de-Valleyfield, Quebec, and died there on September 27, 2026, at the age of 75.

== Career statistics ==
			Regular season					Playoffs
Season	Team	League	GP	G	A	Pts	PIM	GP	G	A	Pts	PIM
1968–69	Drummondville Rangers	QJHL	44	11	13	24	35	10	2	10	12	12
1969–70	Drummondville Rangers	QMJHL	51	51	51	102	186	1	1	0	1	7
1970–71	Drummondville Rangers	QMJHL	58	38	50	88	251	6	2	9	11	14
1971–72	Philadelphia Flyers	NHL	24	1	0	1	15	—	—	—	—	—
1971–72	Richmond Robins	AHL	47	10	17	27	51	—	—	—	—	—
1972–73	Philadelphia Flyers	NHL	2	0	3	3	0	—	—	—	—	—
1972–73	Richmond Robins	AHL	30	9	11	20	56	—	—	—	—	—
1972–73	St. Louis Blues	NHL	49	12	13	25	56	5	2	0	2	15
1973–74	St. Louis Blues	NHL	78	26	28	54	85	—	—	—	—	—
1974–75	St. Louis Blues	NHL	80	34	32	66	125	2	0	0	0	8
1975–76	St. Louis Blues	NHL	74	14	19	33	77	3	0	0	0	6
1976–77	St. Louis Blues	NHL	76	18	20	38	77	4	0	0	0	2
1977–78	Chicago Black Hawks	NHL	77	10	18	28	59	1	0	0	0	0
1978–79	New York Rangers	NHL	70	6	25	31	37	18	0	6	6	20
1979–80	Quebec Nordiques	NHL	69	4	14	18	68	—	—	—	—	—
1979–80	Syracuse Firebirds	AHL	3	0	0	0	2	—	—	—	—	—
NHL totals			599	125	172	297	599	33	2	6	8	51

Preceded by Larry Wright	Philadelphia Flyers first-round draft pick 1971	Succeeded by Bill Barber
