= Michel DeGuise =

Canadian ice hockey player

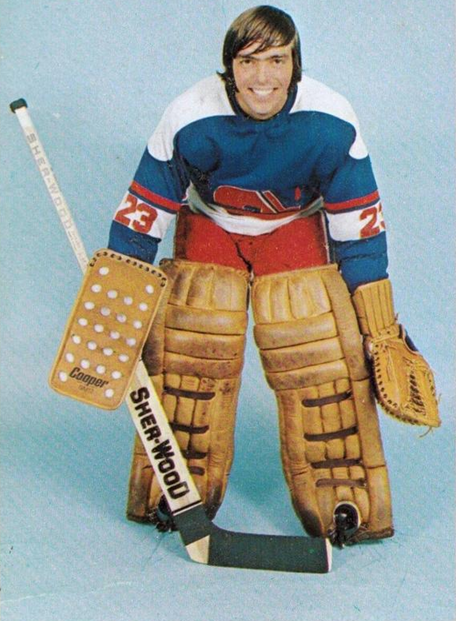
- DeGuise in 1973 photo
- Born: November 6, 1951 (age 74) Sorel, Quebec, Canada
- Height: 5 ft 8 in (173 cm)
- Weight: 163 lb (74 kg; 11 st 9 lb)
- Position: Goaltender
- Caught: Left
- Played for: Quebec Nordiques (WHA)
- NHL draft: 24th overall, 1971; Montreal Canadiens
- Playing career: 1971–1977

Michel DeGuise (born November 6, 1951) is a Canadian former professional ice hockey player who played in the World Hockey Association (WHA). DeGuise played two WHA seasons with the Quebec Nordiques. He was drafted in the second round of the 1971 NHL Amateur Draft by the Montreal Canadiens.

== Awards ==
- 1969–70 Jacques Plante Memorial Trophy
- 1970–71 QMJHL First All-Star Team
- 1972–73 Harry "Hap" Holmes Memorial Award

== Career statistics ==
=== Regular season and playoffs ===
			Regular season									Playoffs
Season	Team	League	GP	W	L	T	MIN	GA	SO	GAA	SV%	GP	W	L	MIN	GA	SO	GAA	SV%
1969–70	Sorel Black Hawks	QMJHL	35	–	–	–	–	141	1	4.00	.905	10	–	–	–	–	–	–	–
1970–71	Sorel Black Hawks	QMJHL	60	–	–	–	–	234	1	3.92	.910	7	–	–	–	–	–	–	–
1971–72	Nova Scotia Voyageurs	AHL	2	–	–	–	120	5	0	2.50	–	–	–	–	–	–	–	–	–
1972–73	Nova Scotia Voyageurs	AHL	28	–	–	–	1551	68	1	2.63	–	1	–	–	–	–	–	–	–
1973–74	Quebec Nordiques	WHA	32	12	13	1	1750	96	1	3.29	.896	–	–	–	–	–	–	–	–
1974–75	Maine Nordiques	NAHL	1	0	1	0	51	7	0	8.22	–	–	–	–	–	–	–	–	–
1975–76	Quebec Nordiques	WHA	18	6	5	2	835	60	0	4.35	.870	–	–	–	–	–	–	–	–
1976–77	Saginaw Gears	IHL	26	–	–	–	1406	80	0	3.41	–	–	–	–	–	–	–	–	–
WHA totals			50	18	18	3	2585	156	1	3.62	.887	–	–	–	–	–	–	–	–
