= Laval Saints =

- City: Laval, Quebec
- League: QMJHL
- Operated: 1969 to 1970
- Home arena: Colisée de Laval

The Laval Saints were a junior ice hockey team that played in Laval, Quebec at the Colisée de Laval. The Saints were a member of the Quebec Junior Hockey League in 1967–68, and the Metropolitan Montreal Junior Hockey League in 1963–67.

The team was promoted to, and played one season in the Quebec Major Junior Hockey League in 1969–70, coached by Hockey Hall of Fame defenceman Doug Harvey. The team's leading scorer that season was Andre Peloffy, a native of France.

== NHL alumni ==
Four alumni of the Laval Saints graduated to play in the National Hockey League.

- Serge Beaudoin (1969–70)
- Jocelyn Guevremont (1967–68)
- Hartland Monahan (1968–69)
- Andre Peloffy (1968–70)

== Yearly results ==
Season	Games	Won	Lost	Tied	Points	Pct %	Goals For	Goals Against	Standing
1969–70	56	18	38	0	36	0.321	203	304	5th West
