= Drummondville Rangers =

Canadian junior ice hockey team

- City: Drummondville, Quebec
- League: Quebec Major Junior Hockey League
- Operated: 1969–1974
- Home arena: Drummondville Civic Centre
- Parent club: New York Rangers

The Drummondville Rangers were a junior ice hockey team that played in Drummondville, Quebec, Canada. They originally played in the Quebec Junior Hockey League, but became a founding member of the Quebec Major Junior Hockey League in 1969. They were originally affiliated with the New York Rangers. They played at the Drummondville Civic Centre. The Rangers folded in 1974.

== NHL alumni ==
List of Drummundville Rangers alumni who graduated to play in the National Hockey League. Marcel Dionne is the only former Ranger in the Hockey Hall of Fame.

- Michel Archambault
- Alain Belanger
- Michel Belhumeur
- Marcel Dionne
- Jean Hamel
- Pierre Hamel
- Gord Haworth
- Yvon Lambert
- Claude Larose
- Kevin Morrison
- Michel Parizeau
- Pierre Plante
- Michel Plasse
