= 1973–74 CHL season =

American ice hockey season

The 1973–74 CHL season was the 11th season of the Central Hockey League, a North American minor professional league. Six teams participated in the regular season, and the Dallas Black Hawks won the league title.

== Regular season ==
Central Hockey League	GP	W	L	OTL	GF	GA	Pts
Omaha Knights	72	34	23	15	259	217	83
Oklahoma City Blazers	72	36	25	11	280	230	83
Dallas Black Hawks	72	29	26	17	220	227	75
Fort Worth Wings	72	30	28	14	237	241	74
Tulsa Oilers	72	28	31	13	233	239	69
Albuquerque Six Guns	72	16	40	16	188	263	48

== Playoffs ==
Semifinals
2	Oklahoma City Blazers	4
4	Fort Worth Wings	1
1	Omaha Knights	1
3	Dallas Black Hawks	4

Final
2	Oklahoma City Blazers	1
3	Dallas Black Hawks	4
