= List of California Golden Seals players =

This is a list of players who have played at least one game for the California Golden Seals franchise of the National Hockey League (NHL). This list does not include players for the Cleveland Barons or the Minnesota North Stars and the Dallas Stars of the NHL.

== Key ==
- Hockey Hall of Famer, or retired number.

Abbreviations
C	Center
D	Defenseman
L	Left wing
R	Right wing

Goaltenders
W	Wins
L	Losses
T	Ties
SO	Shutouts
GAA	Goals against average
SV%	Save percentage

Skaters
GP	Games played
G	Goals
A	Assists
Pts	Points
PIM	Penalty minutes

The "Seasons" column lists the first year of the season of the player's first game and the last year of the season of the player's last game. For example, a player who played one game in the 2000–2001 season would be listed as playing with the team from 2000–2001, regardless of what calendar year the game occurred within.

== Skaters ==
				Regular season					Playoffs				
Player	Team	Position	Years	GP	G	A	Pts	PIM	GP	G	A	Pts	PIM
Frederick Ahern Jr	CSE	R	1974–1976	47	19	9	28	43	—	—	—	—	—
Paul Andrea	CSE	R	1970–1971	9	1	0	1	2	—	—	—	—	—
Ken Baird	CSE	D	1971–1972	10	0	2	2	15	—	—	—	—	—
Bob Baun	OAK	D	1967–1968	67	3	10	13	81	—	—	—	—	—
Ron Boehm	OAK	L	1967–1968	16	2	1	3	10	—	—	—	—	—
Ivan Boldirev	CSE	C	1971–1974	191	52	77	129	134	—	—	—	—	—
Barry Boughner	BOTH	L	1969–1971	20	0	0	0	11	—	—	—	—	—
Wally Boyer	OAK	C	1967–1968	74	13	20	33	44	—	—	—	—	—
Lyle Bradley	CSE	C	1973–1974	4	1	0	1	2	—	—	—	—	—
John Brenneman	OAK	L	1967–1969	52	11	10	21	20	—	—	—	—	—
Charlie Burns	OAK	C	1967–1968	73	9	26	35	20	—	—	—	—	—
Larry Cahan	OAK	D	1967–1968	74	9	15	24	80	—	—	—	—	—
Wayne Carleton	CSE	L	1971–1972	76	17	14	31	45	—	—	—	—	—
Alain Caron	OAK	R	1967–1968	58	9	13	22	18	—	—	—	—	—
Michael Christie	CSE	D	1974–1976	112	3	32	35	228	—	—	—	—	—
Terry Clancy	OAK	R	1967–1968	7	0	0	0	2	—	—	—	—	—
Gary Coalter	CSE	R	1973–1974	4	0	0	0	0	—	—	—	—	—
Gary Croteau	CSE	R	1970–1974	270	47	76	123	47	—	—	—	—	—
Barry Cummins	CSE	D	1973–1974	36	1	2	3	39	—	—	—	—	—
Jean Cusson	OAK	L	1967–1968	2	0	0	0	0	—	—	—	—	—
Bob Dillabough	OAK	C	1968–1970	100	12	17	29	20	11	3	0	3	0
Kent Douglas	OAK	D	1967–1968	40	4	11	15	80	—	—	—	—	—
Gerry Ehman	BOTH	R	1967–1971	297	69	86	155	56	11	3	3	6	0
Aut Erickson	OAK	D	1967–1970	66	4	11	15	46	—	—	—	—	—
Tony Featherstone	BOTH	R	1969–1971	76	8	9	17	61	2	0	0	0	0
Norman Ferguson	BOTH	R	1968–1972	279	73	66	139	72	10	1	4	5	7
Leonard Frig	CSE	D	1974–1976	142	6	29	35	182	—	—	—	—	—
Dave Gardner	CSE	C	1974–1976	138	32	52	84	14	—	—	—	—	—
Stan Gilbertson	CSE	L	1971–1975	235	41	47	88	107	—	—	—	—	—
Bob Girard	CSE	L	1975–1976	80	16	26	42	54	—	—	—	—	—
Hilliard Graves	CSE	R	1970–1974	153	38	43	81	82	—	—	—	—	—
Bruce Greig	CSE	L	1973–1975	9	0	1	1	46	—	—	—	—	—
Del Hall	CSE	C	1971–1974	9	2	0	2	2	—	—	—	—	—
Ted Hampson	BOTH	C	1967–1971	246	61	123	184	37	11	4	5	9	2
Richard Hampton	CSE	D	1974–1976	151	22	54	76	93	—	—	—	—	—
Joe Hardy	BOTH	C	1969–1971	63	9	14	23	51	4	0	0	0	0
Billy Harris	OAK	C	1967–1969	81	12	21	33	4	—	—	—	—	—
Ron Harris	OAK	D	1967–1968	54	4	6	10	60	—	—	—	—	—
Dennis Hextall	CSE	C	1970–1971	78	21	31	52	217	—	—	—	—	—
Bill Hicke	BOTH	R	1967–1971	262	79	101	180	155	11	0	4	4	6
Ernest Hicke	CSE	L	1970–1972	146	33	37	70	117	—	—	—	—	—
Gary Holt	CSE	L	1973–1976	50	6	6	12	50	—	—	—	—	—
Harry Howell (1979)	BOTH	D	1969–1971	83	4	25	29	66	4	0	1	1	2
Dave Hrechkosy	CSE	L	1973–1976	112	38	19	57	39	—	—	—	—	—
Frank Hughes	CSE	L	1971–1972	5	0	0	0	0	—	—	—	—	—
Ron Huston	CSE	C	1973–1975	79	15	31	46	8	—	—	—	—	—
Earl Ingarfield	BOTH	C	1968–1971	129	34	47	81	22	11	5	6	11	6
Tim Jacobs	CSE	D	1975–1976	46	0	10	10	35	—	—	—	—	—
Gary Jarrett	BOTH	L	1968–1972	268	54	71	125	111	11	3	1	4	9
Joey Johnston	CSE	L	1971–1975	288	84	101	185	308	—	—	—	—	—
Marshall Johnston	CSE	D	1971–1974	202	14	47	61	42	—	—	—	—	—
Jim Jones	CSE	D	1971–1972	2	0	0	0	0	—	—	—	—	—
Rick Kessell	CSE	C	1973–1974	51	2	6	8	4	—	—	—	—	—
Wayne King	CSE	C	1973–1976	73	5	18	23	34	—	—	—	—	—
Ralph Klassen	CSE	C	1975–1976	71	6	15	21	26	—	—	—	—	—
Francois Lacombe	OAK	D	1968–1970	74	2	16	18	50	3	1	0	1	0
Pete Laframboise	CSE	L	1971–1974	147	23	32	55	40	—	—	—	—	—
Mike Laughton	BOTH	C	1967–1971	189	39	48	87	101	11	2	4	6	0
Brian Lavender	CSE	L	1974–1975	65	3	7	10	48	—	—	—	—	—
Reginald Leach	CSE	R	1971–1974	171	51	43	94	86	—	—	—	—	—
Bob Lemieux	OAK	D	1967–1968	19	0	1	1	12	—	—	—	—	—
Reginald MacAdam	CSE	R	1974–1976	160	50	56	106	104	—	—	—	—	—
Darryl Maggs	CSE	D	1972–1973	54	7	15	22	46	—	—	—	—	—
Bert Marshall	BOTH	D	1967–1973	313	8	60	68	395	11	0	8	8	32
Dennis Maruk	CSE	C	1975–1976	80	30	32	62	44	—	—	—	—	—
Dick Mattiussi	BOTH	D	1968–1971	156	8	27	35	92	8	0	1	1	6
Ted McAneeley	CSE	D	1972–1975	158	8	35	43	141	—	—	—	—	—
Ray McKay	CSE	D	1973–1974	72	2	12	14	49	—	—	—	—	—
Walter McKechnie	CSE	C	1971–1974	197	50	87	137	112	—	—	—	—	—
Brent Meeke	CSE	D	1972–1976	26	1	9	10	4	—	—	—	—	—
Howie Menard	OAK	C	1969–1970	38	2	7	9	16	1	0	0	0	0
Wayne Merrick	CSE	C	1975–1976	56	25	27	52	36	—	—	—	—	—
Hartland Monahan	CSE	R	1973–1974	1	0	0	0	0	—	—	—	—	—
Morris Mott	CSE	R	1972–1975	199	18	32	50	49	—	—	—	—	—
Jim Moxey	CSE	R	1974–1976	91	15	20	35	37	—	—	—	—	—
Wayne Muloin	BOTH	D	1969–1971	137	3	20	23	85	4	0	0	0	0
Robert Murdoch	CSE	R	1975–1976	78	22	27	49	53	—	—	—	—	—
Terry Murray	CSE	D	1972–1975	90	0	17	17	60	—	—	—	—	—
Jim Neilson	CSE	D	1974–1976	98	4	23	27	76	—	—	—	—	—
Neil Nicholson	OAK	D	1969–1970	—	—	—	—	—	2	0	0	0	0
Don O'Donoghue	BOTH	R	1969–1972	125	18	17	35	35	3	0	0	0	0
Gerry Odrowski	OAK	D	1967–1969	116	9	7	16	34	7	0	1	1	2
Jim Pappin	CSE	R	1975–1976	32	6	13	19	12	—	—	—	—	—
Larry Patey	CSE	C	1973–1976	98	29	24	53	91	—	—	—	—	—
Craig Patrick	CSE	R	1971–1975	203	40	46	86	35	—	—	—	—	—
Glenn Patrick	CSE	D	1974–1975	2	0	0	0	0	—	—	—	—	—
Brian Perry	OAK	C	1968–1970	95	16	29	45	24	8	1	1	2	4
George Pesut	CSE	D	1974–1976	92	3	22	25	130	—	—	—	—	—
Gerry Pinder	CSE	L	1971–1972	74	23	31	54	59	—	—	—	—	—
Larry Popein	OAK	C	1967–1968	47	5	14	19	12	—	—	—	—	—
Tracy Pratt	OAK	D	1967–1968	34	0	5	5	90	—	—	—	—	—
Thomas Price	CSE	D	1974–1976	8	0	0	0	4	—	—	—	—	—
Richard Redmond	CSE	D	1970–1973	109	15	52	67	110	—	—	—	—	—
Doug Roberts	BOTH	R	1968–1971	230	11	57	68	280	11	0	3	3	40
Len Ronson	OAK	L	1968–1969	5	0	0	0	0	—	—	—	—	—
Gary Sabourin	CSE	R	1975–1976	76	21	28	49	33	—	—	—	—	—
Ron Serafini	CSE	D	1973–1974	2	0	0	0	2	—	—	—	—	—
Paul Shakes	CSE	D	1973–1974	21	0	4	4	12	—	—	—	—	—
Bobby Sheehan	CSE	C	1971–1972	78	20	26	46	12	—	—	—	—	—
Paul Shmyr	CSE	D	1971–1972	69	6	21	27	156	—	—	—	—	—
Charles Simmer	CSE	L	1974–1976	56	9	14	23	48	—	—	—	—	—
Al Simmons	CSE	D	1971–1972	1	0	0	0	0	—	—	—	—	—
Gregory Smith	CSE	D	1975–1976	1	0	1	1	2	—	—	—	—	—
Richard Smith	CSE	D	1971–1973	81	10	28	38	103	—	—	—	—	—
Frank Spring	CSE	R	1974–1976	29	3	10	13	6	—	—	—	—	—
Ronald Stackhouse	CSE	D	1970–1972	83	9	27	36	79	—	—	—	—	—
John Stewart	CSE	L	1974–1975	76	19	19	38	55	—	—	—	—	—
Robert Stewart	CSE	D	1971–1976	269	16	53	69	499	—	—	—	—	—
George Swarbrick	OAK	R	1967–1969	99	16	18	34	137	—	—	—	—	—
Joe Szura	OAK	C	1967–1969	90	10	15	25	30	7	2	3	5	2
Tom Thurlby	OAK	D	1967–1968	20	1	1	2	4	—	—	—	—	—
Gene Ubriaco	OAK	L	1968–1970	42	5	8	13	18	7	2	0	2	2
Carol Vadnais	BOTH	D	1968–1972	246	63	83	146	560	11	3	5	8	25
Pete Vipond	CSE	L	1972–1973	3	0	0	0	0	—	—	—	—	—
Bryan Watson	OAK	D	1968–1969	50	2	3	5	97	—	—	—	—	—
Thomas Webster	CSE	R	1971–1972	7	2	1	3	6	—	—	—	—	—
Stanley Weir	CSE	C	1972–1975	216	42	58	100	38	—	—	—	—	—
Butch Williams	CSE	R	1974–1976	77	11	25	36	125	—	—	—	—	—
Tommy Williams	CSE	R	1970–1972	50	10	19	29	10	—	—	—	—	—
Larry Wright	CSE	C	1974–1975	2	0	0	0	0	—	—	—	—	—

== Goaltenders ==
			Regular season							Playoffs					
Player	Team	Years	GP	W	L	T	SO	GAA	SV%	GP	W	L	SO	GAA	SV%
Lyle Carter	CSE	1971–1972	15	4	7	0	0	4.16	—	—	—	—	—	—	—
Bob Champoux	CSE	1973–1974	17	2	11	3	0	5.20	—	—	—	—	—	—	—
Marv Edwards	CSE	1972–1974	35	5	24	3	1	4.17	—	—	—	—	—	—	—
Charlie Hodge	OAK	1967–1970	86	20	40	16	3	3.09	—	—	—	—	—	—	—
Gary Kurt	CSE	1971–1972	16	1	7	5	0	4.30	—	—	—	—	—	—	—
Gilles Meloche	CSE	1971–1976	250	58	140	48	8	3.83	—	—	—	—	—	—	—
Gary Simmons	CSE	1974–1976	74	25	40	8	4	3.49	—	—	—	—	—	—	—
Gary Smith	BOTH	1967–1971	211	61	119	27	9	3.41	—	11	3	8	0	3.23	—
Bob Sneddon	CSE	1970–1971	5	0	2	0	0	5.60	—	—	—	—	—	—	—
Ted Tucker	CSE	1973–1974	5	1	1	1	0	3.39	—	—	—	—	—	—	—
Chris Worthy	BOTH	1968–1971	26	5	10	4	0	4.43	—	—	—	—	—	—	—

== See also ==
- List of NHL players
- List of Cleveland Barons players
