= List of Cleveland Barons players =

This is a list of players who have played at least one game for the Cleveland Barons of the National Hockey League (NHL). This list does not include players for the Minnesota North Stars and the Dallas Stars of the NHL.

== Key ==
Abbreviations
C	Center
D	Defenseman
L	Left wing
R	Right wing

Goaltenders
W	Wins
L	Losses
T	Ties
SO	Shutouts
GAA	Goals against average
SV%	Save percentage

Skaters
GP	Games played
G	Goals
A	Assists
Pts	Points
PIM	Penalty minutes

== Skaters ==
			Regular season				
Player	Position	Years	GP	G	A	Pts	PIM
Frederick Ahern Jr	R	1976–1978	61	7	8	15	68
Jeff Allan	D	1977–1978	4	0	0	0	2
Chuck Arnason	R	1977–1978	40	21	13	34	8
John Baby	D	1977–1978	24	2	7	9	26
Lyle Bradley	C	1976–1977	2	0	0	0	0
Daniel Chicoine	R	1977–1978	6	0	0	0	0
Michael Christie	D	1976–1978	113	7	33	40	128
Michael Crombeen	R	1977–1978	48	3	4	7	13
Michael Fidler	L	1976–1978	124	40	44	84	55
Leonard Frig	D	1976–1977	66	2	7	9	213
Dave Gardner	C	1976–1978	151	35	47	82	19
Bob Girard	L	1976–1978	93	11	14	25	44
Richard Hampton	D	1976–1978	134	34	42	76	32
Gary Holt	L	1976–1977	2	0	1	1	2
Stewart Holt	D	1977–1978	48	1	4	5	229
Richard Jodzio	R	1977–1978	38	2	3	5	43
Bjorn Johansson	D	1976–1978	15	1	1	2	10
Reginald Kerr	C	1977–1978	7	0	2	2	7
Ralph Klassen	C	1976–1978	93	16	19	35	29
Kenneth Kuzyk	R	1976–1978	41	5	9	14	8
Reginald MacAdam	R	1976–1978	160	38	73	111	110
Kris Manery	R	1977–1978	78	22	27	49	14
Dennis Maruk	C	1976–1978	156	64	85	149	118
Walter McKechnie	C	1977–1978	53	12	22	34	12
Brent Meeke	D	1976–1977	49	8	13	21	4
Wayne Merrick	C	1976–1978	98	20	43	63	33
Angelo Moretto	C	1976–1977	5	1	2	3	2
Jim Moxey	R	1976–1977	35	7	7	14	20
Robert Murdoch	R	1976–1978	128	37	45	82	57
Jim Neilson	D	1976–1978	115	5	38	43	62
Dennis O'Brien	D	1977–1978	23	0	3	3	31
Jim Pappin	R	1976–1977	24	2	8	10	8
Jean-Paul Parise	L	1977–1978	40	9	13	22	27
Glenn Patrick	D	1976–1977	35	2	3	5	70
Jean Potvin	D	1977–1978	40	3	14	17	30
Thomas Price	D	1976–1977	2	0	0	0	0
Darcy Regier	D	1977–1978	15	0	1	1	28
Phil Roberto	R	1976–1977	21	3	4	7	8
Gary Sabourin	R	1976–1977	33	7	11	18	4
Richard Shinske	C	1976–1978	52	5	12	17	8
Charles Simmer	L	1976–1977	24	2	0	2	16
Gregory Smith	D	1976–1978	154	16	47	63	157
Frank Spring	R	1976–1977	26	11	10	21	6
Vern Stenlund	C	1976–1977	4	0	0	0	0
Robert Stewart	D	1976–1978	145	3	27	30	192
Juha Widing	C	1976–1977	29	6	8	14	10

== Goaltenders ==
		Regular season						
Player	Years	GP	W	L	T	SO	GAA	SV%
Gary Edwards	1976–1978	47	10	28	8	2	4.36	—
Gilles Meloche	1976–1978	105	35	51	14	3	3.62	—
Gary Simmons	1976–1977	15	2	8	4	1	3.64	—

== See also ==
- List of NHL players
