= Dave Gardner (ice hockey) =

Canadian ice hockey player (1952–2023)

- Born: August 23, 1952 Toronto, Ontario, Canada
- Died: March 19, 2023 (aged 70) Newmarket, Ontario
- Height: 6 ft 0 in (183 cm)
- Weight: 183 lb (83 kg; 13 st 1 lb)
- Position: Centre
- Shot: Right
- Played for: Montreal Canadiens; St. Louis Blues; California Golden Seals; Cleveland Barons; Philadelphia Flyers
- NHL draft: 8th overall, 1972; Montreal Canadiens
- Playing career: 1972–1985

David Calvin Gardner (August 23, 1952 – March 19, 2023) was a Canadian professional ice hockey centre who played 350 National Hockey League (NHL) games for the Montreal Canadiens, St. Louis Blues, California Golden Seals, Cleveland Barons, and Philadelphia Flyers.

== Career ==
Gardner was drafted eighth overall by Montreal in the 1972 NHL Amateur Draft from the Toronto Marlboros after having won the Red Tilson Trophy as the Ontario Hockey League's Most Outstanding Player. As a youth, Gardner played in the 1964 Quebec International Pee-Wee Hockey Tournament with a minor ice hockey team from Leaside.

== Personal life and death ==
Dave Gardner was the son of Cal Gardner and elder brother of Paul Gardner and the father of Canadian-Swiss player Ryan Gardner.

Gardner resided in the Aurora, Ontario in his latter years.

Gardner died on March 19, 2023, in Newmarket, Ontario, at the age of 70, of complications from a blood infection.

== Career statistics ==
			Regular season					Playoffs
Season	Team	League	GP	G	A	Pts	PIM	GP	G	A	Pts	PIM
1969–70	St. Michael's Buzzers	MetJHL	36	54	42	96	—	—	—	—	—	—
1970–71	Toronto Marlboros	OHA-Jr.	62	56	81	137	7	13	7	10	17	2
1971–72	Toronto Marlboros	OHA-Jr.	57	53	76	129	16	10	7	17	24	4
1972–73	Montreal Canadiens	NHL	5	1	1	2	0	—	—	—	—	—
1972–73	Nova Scotia Voyageurs	AHL	66	28	44	72	15	13	5	6	11	4
1973–74	Montreal Canadiens	NHL	31	1	10	11	2	—	—	—	—	—
1973–74	St. Louis Blues	NHL	15	5	2	7	6	—	—	—	—	—
1974–75	St. Louis Blues	NHL	8	0	2	2	0	—	—	—	—	—
1974–75	California Golden Seals	NHL	64	16	20	36	6	—	—	—	—	—
1975–76	California Golden Seals	NHL	74	16	32	48	8	—	—	—	—	—
1976–77	Cleveland Barons	NHL	76	16	22	38	9	—	—	—	—	—
1977–78	Cleveland Barons	NHL	75	19	25	44	10	—	—	—	—	—
1978–79	Springfield Indians	AHL	10	1	3	4	0	—	—	—	—	—
1978–79	Tulsa Oilers	CHL	20	4	10	14	2	—	—	—	—	—
1978–79	Dallas Black Hawks	CHL	39	6	27	33	6	9	5	7	12	4
1979–80	Binghamton Dusters	AHL	18	3	9	12	2	—	—	—	—	—
1979–80	Philadelphia Flyers	NHL	2	1	1	2	0	—	—	—	—	—
1979–80	Maine Mariners	AHL	37	20	35	55	16	12	2	5	7	4
1980–81	HC Ambrì–Piotta	SUI.2	37	51	56	107	32	—	—	—	—	—
1981–82	HC Ambrì–Piotta	SUI.2	38	47	41	88	—	—	—	—	—	—
1982–83	HC Ambrì–Piotta	NDA	36	36	22	58	—	—	—	—	—	—
1983–84	EHC Visp	SUI.2	40	41	36	77	14	—	—	—	—	—
1984–85	EHC Visp	SUI.2	40	51	51	102	38	—	—	—	—	—
1985–86	EHC Visp	SUI.3	22	35	33	68	26	—	—	—	—	—
1986–87	EHC Visp	SUI.3	22	33	36	69	0	—	—	—	—	—
1987–88	EHC Visp	SUI.3	20	50	22	72	—	10	18	8	26	—
NHL totals			350	75	115	190	41	—	—	—	—	—
AHL totals			131	52	91	143	33	25	7	11	18	8
SUI.2 totals			155	190	184	374	—	—	—	—	—	—

== See also ==
- Notable families in the NHL

Preceded by Michel Larocque	Montreal Canadiens first-round draft pick 1972	Succeeded by John Van Boxmeer
