= Paul Deneau Trophy =

The Paul Deneau Trophy was presented annually to the World Hockey Association's most gentlemanly player.

It was named in honor of Paul Deneau, founder of the Houston Aeros hockey club.

== Winners ==
- 1973 – Ted Hampson, Minnesota Fighting Saints
- 1974 – Ralph Backstrom, Chicago Cougars
- 1975 – Mike Rogers, Edmonton Oilers
- 1976 – Vaclav Nedomansky, Toronto Toros
- 1977 – Dave Keon, New England Whalers
- 1978 – Dave Keon, New England Whalers
- 1979 – Kent Nilsson, Winnipeg Jets
