= Bert Marshall =

Canadian ice hockey player (born 1943)

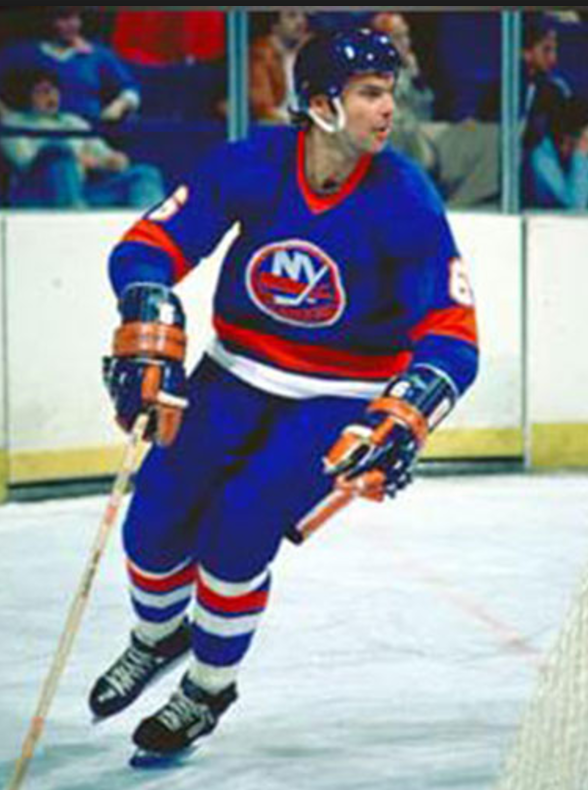
- Marshall, c. late 1970s for New York Islanders
- Born: November 22, 1943 (age 82) Kamloops, British Columbia, Canada
- Height: 6 ft 2 in (188 cm)
- Weight: 195 lb (88 kg; 13 st 13 lb)
- Position: Defence
- Shot: Left
- Played for: Detroit Red Wings; Oakland Seals/California Golden Seals; New York Rangers; New York Islanders
- Playing career: 1965–1979

Albert Leroy "Moose" Marshall (born November 22, 1943) is a Canadian former professional ice hockey defenceman who played in the National Hockey League for the Detroit Red Wings, Oakland Seals/California Golden Seals, New York Rangers and New York Islanders.

== Playing career ==
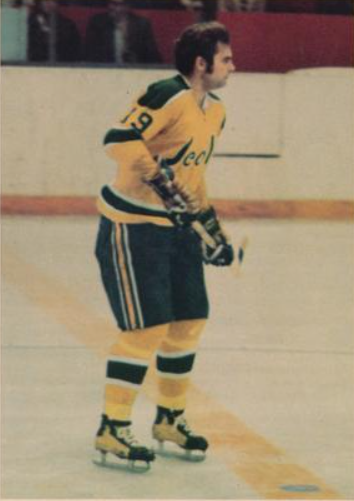
1971-72 photo of Marshall for California Golden Seals; he played 313 games for the team

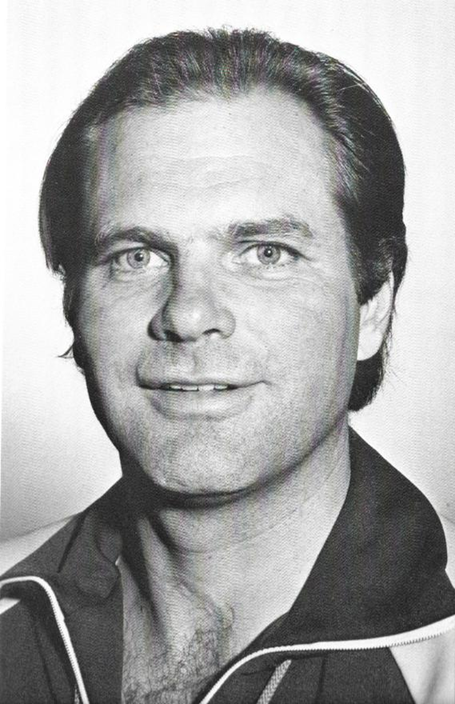
1981 postcard for Marshall for Colorado Rockies

Marshall was a rugged, stay-at-home defenceman who could also provide crisp outlet passes to his forwards. In his rookie season with the Detroit Red Wings, his fine play made him a contender for the Calder Memorial Trophy. The Red Wings made the Stanley Cup Final that season before Montreal defeated them in six games.

After a slump year for the Red Wings, they decided to trade Marshall, with Ted Hampson, to the Oakland Seals for defenceman Kent Douglas in 1968. The Seals finished second in 1968–69 and fourth in 1969–70 in the NHL West Division, and Marshall's fine play was part of the reason. The Oakland Seals became the California Golden Seals in 1970–71, and Marshall was injured much of the year, which contributed to the Seals' last place finish.

Marshall was traded to the New York Rangers late in the 1972–73 season but only played eight games. He was drafted by the New York Islanders in the 1973 NHL Intra-League Draft and it was here that he played his best hockey. He developed shot-blocking abilities and his play and leadership helped the Islanders make the Stanley Cup semifinals in 1975 and 1976.

Marshall's skating began to decline in the 1978–79 season. He announced his retirement as an active player on June 12, 1979. He later coached minor league hockey before coaching the NHL's Colorado Rockies for 24 games in 1981–82 before he was fired and replaced by Marshall Johnston.

Marshall now lives in Poulsbo, Washington, and currently is an amateur scout for the Carolina Hurricanes. He won the Stanley Cup with Carolina in 2006. On January 7, 2017, he was selected to drop the ceremonial first puck at the San Jose Sharks game vs. the Detroit Red Wings when the Sharks honored the Golden Seals.

== Career statistics ==
			Regular season					Playoffs
Season	Team	League	GP	G	A	Pts	PIM	GP	G	A	Pts	PIM
1962–63	Edmonton Oil Kings	CAHL	—	—	—	—	—	—	—	—	—	—
1962–63	Edmonton Oil Kings	M-Cup	—	—	—	—	—	17	0	2	2	10
1963–64	Edmonton Oil Kings	CAHL	30	28	35	63	78	5	1	3	4	6
1963–64	Edmonton Oil Kings	M-Cup	—	—	—	—	—	19	8	21	29	10
1963–64	Cincinnati Wings	CPHL	1	0	0	0	0	—	—	—	—	—
1964–65	Memphis Wings	CPHL	51	3	11	14	43	—	—	—	—	—
1965–66	Detroit Red Wings	NHL	61	0	19	19	45	12	1	3	4	16
1965–66	Pittsburgh Hornets	AHL	12	2	0	2	8	—	—	—	—	—
1966–67	Detroit Red Wings	NHL	57	0	10	10	68	—	—	—	—	—
1967–68	Detroit Red Wings	NHL	37	1	5	6	56	—	—	—	—	—
1967–68	Oakland Seals	NHL	20	0	4	4	18	—	—	—	—	—
1968–69	Oakland Seals	NHL	68	3	15	18	81	7	0	7	7	20
1969–70	Oakland Seals	NHL	72	1	15	16	109	4	0	1	1	12
1970–71	California Golden Seals	NHL	32	2	6	8	48	—	—	—	—	—
1971–72	California Golden Seals	NHL	66	0	14	14	68	—	—	—	—	—
1972–73	California Golden Seals	NHL	55	2	6	8	71	—	—	—	—	—
1972–73	New York Rangers	NHL	8	0	0	0	14	6	0	1	1	8
1973–74	New York Islanders	NHL	69	1	7	8	84	—	—	—	—	—
1974–75	New York Islanders	NHL	77	2	28	30	58	17	2	5	7	16
1975–76	New York Islanders	NHL	71	0	16	16	72	13	1	3	4	12
1976–77	New York Islanders	NHL	72	4	21	25	61	6	0	0	0	6
1977–78	New York Islanders	NHL	58	0	7	7	44	7	0	2	2	9
1978–79	New York Islanders	NHL	45	1	8	9	29	—	—	—	—	—
1979–80	Indianapolis Checkers	CHL	6	0	0	0	6	—	—	—	—	—
NHL totals			868	17	181	198	926	72	4	22	26	99

== Coaching record ==
Team	Year	Regular season						Postseason
Team	Year	G	W	L	T	Pts	Finish	Result
Colorado Rockies	1981–82	24	3	17	4	(49)	5th in Smythe	Missed playoffs

Preceded by Carol Vadnais	California Golden Seals captain 1972–73	Succeeded by Joey Johnston
Preceded by Bill MacMillan	Head coach of the Colorado Rockies; 1981–82	Succeeded by Marshall Johnston
