= Gord Hampson =

Canadian ice hockey player

- Born: February 13, 1959 (age 67) Vancouver, British Columbia, Canada
- Height: 6 ft 3 in (191 cm)
- Weight: 210 lb (95 kg; 15 st 0 lb)
- Position: Left wing
- Shot: Left
- Played for: Calgary Flames
- NHL draft: Undrafted
- Playing career: 1981–1984

Gordon Hampson (born February 13, 1959) is a Canadian former professional ice hockey player. He played 4 games in the National Hockey League with the Calgary Flames during the 1982–83 season. His father, Ted Hampson, also played in the NHL.

== Biography ==
His father, Ted Hampson, also played in the NHL, and in the World Hockey Association. He attended Edina East High School in Edina, Minnesota, while his father was playing for the Minnesota Fighting Saints.

He played his college hockey at the University of Michigan. After a successful 4 years there he signed with the Flames. Although at the time few college players made the NHL he was one of them when he played four games in the 1982–83 season.

== Career statistics ==
=== Regular season and playoffs ===
			Regular season					Playoffs
Season	Team	League	GP	G	A	Pts	PIM	GP	G	A	Pts	PIM
1976–77	Edina East High School	HS-MN	—	—	—	—	—	—	—	—	—	—
1977–78	University of Michigan	B1G	36	9	7	16	21	—	—	—	—	—
1978–79	University of Michigan	B1G	36	6	6	12	24	—	—	—	—	—
1979–80	University of Michigan	B1G	30	7	15	22	22	—	—	—	—	—
1980–81	University of Michigan	B1G	40	15	23	38	40	—	—	—	—	—
1981–82	Oklahoma City Stars	CHL	71	11	23	34	48	1	0	0	0	0
1982–83	Calgary Flames	NHL	4	0	0	0	5	—	—	—	—	—
1982–83	Colorado Flames	CHL	51	17	17	34	73	6	2	5	7	4
1983–84	Colorado Flames	CHL	62	19	25	44	89	—	—	—	—	—
CHL totals			184	47	65	112	210	7	2	5	7	4
NHL totals			4	0	0	0	5	—	—	—	—	—
