= California Golden Seals =

Former National Hockey League team (1967–1976)

- Founded: 1961 (WHL); 1967 (as NHL expansion team)
- History: San Francisco Seals; 1961–1966 (WHL); California Seals; 1966–1967 (WHL); California Seals; 1967 (NHL); Oakland Seals; 1967–1970 (NHL); Bay Area Seals; 1970 (NHL); California Golden Seals; 1970–1976 (NHL); Cleveland Barons; 1976–1978 (NHL)
- Home arena: Oakland–Alameda County Coliseum Arena
- City: Oakland, California
- Team colors: Kelly green, royal blue, white (1967–1970) Kelly green, California gold, snow white (1970–1974) Pacific teal, gold, white (1974–1976)
- Stanley Cups: 0
- Conference championships: 0
- Division championships: 0

The California Golden Seals were a professional ice hockey club that competed in the National Hockey League (NHL) from 1967 to 1976. Based in Oakland, California, the team played home games at the Oakland–Alameda County Coliseum Arena. The Seals were one of six teams added to the league as part of the 1967 NHL expansion. Initially named the California Seals, the team was renamed the Oakland Seals during the 1967–68 season and then the Bay Area Seals in 1970 before becoming the California Golden Seals the same year.

The Seals were the least successful of the teams added in the 1967 expansion, never earning a winning record and only making the playoffs twice in nine seasons. The franchise drew sparse crowds for home games. The franchise moved in 1976 to become the Cleveland Barons, who would merge with the Minnesota North Stars two years later. They were the only franchise from the 1967 expansion to never reach a Stanley Cup Final. (Note: The five surviving teams from the 1967 expansion have each won at least one Stanley Cup, although in the case of the Minnesota North Stars, the championship was won after the franchise would merge (though keeping their name intact) with the Cleveland Barons and later relocated to Dallas to become the Dallas Stars. The North Stars reached the Stanley Cup Final twice post-merger while it was based in Minnesota.)

== History ==
=== Founding ===
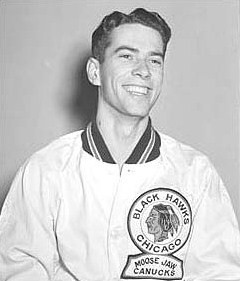
Bert Olmstead, the Seals' first coach and general manager

In 1966, the NHL announced that six expansion teams would be added as a new division for the 1967–68 season, officially because of a general desire to expand the league to new markets, but also to squelch the Western Hockey League's threat to turn into a major league. The San Francisco Seals were one such team from the WHL. The NHL awarded an expansion team to Barry Van Gerbig for the San Francisco Bay Area. Van Gerbig decided to purchase the WHL club with the intent of bringing them into the NHL as an expansion team the following season.

Van Gerbig had planned to have the team play in a new arena in San Francisco, but the new arena was never built. He decided to move the team across the Bay from the Cow Palace in Daly City to Oakland to play in the new Oakland–Alameda County Coliseum Arena. He renamed the club the California Seals. This was done in an attempt to appeal to fans from San Francisco, and to address complaints from the other NHL teams that Oakland was not considered a major league city and would not be a draw for fans.

A year later, Van Gerbig brought the Seals into the NHL as an expansion team. The team participated with the other five expansion teams in the 1967 NHL expansion draft; however, the terms imposed by the established Original Six teams were very one-sided in their favor. The existing NHL teams were permitted to protect nearly all of their best players, thus the players available for selection were mostly castoffs, aging players well past their prime and career minor leaguers. To bolster their roster and also to maintain a semblance of familiarity and continuity for existing Seals fans, the team retained a portion of the club's WHL roster such as Charlie Burns, George Swarbrick, Gerry Odrowski, Tom Thurlby, and Ron Harris.

The Bay Area was not considered a particularly lucrative ice hockey market; however, the terms of a new television agreement with CBS called for two of the expansion teams to be located in California and other than the Los Angeles Kings there were no other prospective franchise applicants of similar pedigree to the Seals. Nevertheless, while the WHL Seals had drawn well at the Cow Palace the team drew poorly in Oakland once they entered the NHL. The plan to bring fans in from San Francisco failed, and on November 6, 1967, Van Gerbig announced that the team's name would be changed to the Oakland Seals (although the league did not register the change until December 8 to focus more on the East Bay).

=== Struggles ===
Oakland Seals logo, 1967–1970

The Seals were never successful at the gate even after the name change, and because of this poor attendance Van Gerbig threatened on numerous occasions to move the team elsewhere. First-year coach and general manager Bert Olmstead publicly advocated a move to Vancouver, resulting in an offer from Labatt Brewing Company to purchase and move the team to the Canadian city, as well as a proposal from brothers Seymour and Northrup Knox to purchase and move the franchise to Buffalo, which like Vancouver had been shut out of the 1967 expansion. The NHL, not wanting to endanger its TV deal with CBS, rejected both proposals. As a compromise, the NHL agreed to expand again in 1970, adding teams in both Vancouver (the Canucks) and Buffalo (the Sabres). The Knoxes bought a minority share of the Seals in 1969, only to sell it a year later to fund the Sabres.

This, as well as the team's mediocre on-ice performance, led to major changes to the Seals' front office and the roster – only 7 of the 20 Seals players remained after the first season. The new-look Seals were somewhat more successful. In their second season they improved to 69 points, which while still seven games below .500 was good enough for second place in the all-expansion West Division. The Seals were favored to win their first-round playoff matchup against the Kings, but were upset in seven games. Oakland regressed to 58 points the following season, but still edged out the Philadelphia Flyers for the final playoff spot on a tiebreaker. In their second and final playoff appearance, they were swept by the Pittsburgh Penguins.

The league's rejection of a proposed move to Vancouver prompted a lawsuit that was not settled until 1974 (San Francisco Seals Ltd. v. National Hockey League). The Seals organization filed suit against the NHL claiming that the prohibition violated the Sherman Act. The Seals asserted that the league's constitution was in violation by prohibiting clubs from moving their operations, and that the relocation request was denied in an attempt to keep the San Francisco market in the NHL and thereby discourage the formation of a rival team or league in that location. The court ruled that the NHL was a single entity, and that the teams were not competitors in an economic sense, so the league restrictions on moving were not a restraint of trade.

Before the 1969–70 season, the team was sold to Trans-National Communications, whose investors included Pat Summerall and Whitey Ford. However, the group filed for bankruptcy after missing a payment and relinquished the team to Van Gerbig, who put the team back on the market.

=== Charles O. Finley purchases the franchise ===
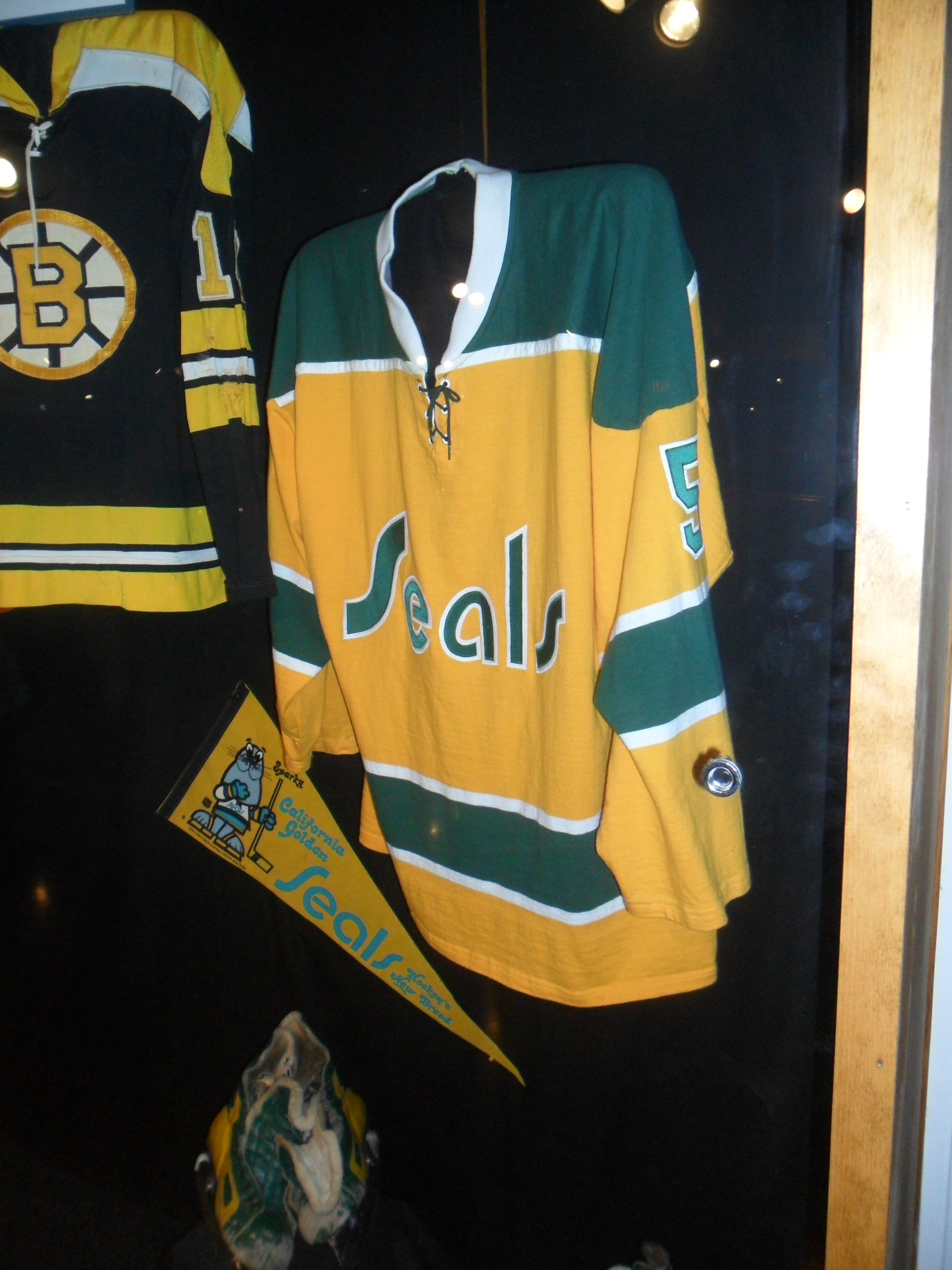
Yellow home jersey (replica) and colored skates of the Golden Seals, on display at the International Hockey Hall of Fame

Before the 1970–71 season, Charles O. Finley, the flamboyant and eccentric owner of Major League Baseball's Oakland Athletics, purchased the Seals. Finley and roller derby boss Jerry Seltzer had both put in bids on the team. Although Seltzer's offer was slightly better financed and included a more detailed plan for revival, a majority of NHL owners from the "old establishment" voted in favor of Finley. General manager Bill Torrey left by mid-season due to clashes with Finley.

Finley renamed the team the "Bay Area Seals" to begin the 1970–71 season. However, on October 16, 1970, just two games into the season, he changed the team name to the "California Golden Seals". This followed other marketing gimmicks, including changing the Seals' colors to green and gold to match those of the popular Athletics. The team's uniform crest was now the word "Seals" in a unique typeface, but an alternate logo using a sketch based on a photo of star player Carol Vadnais was used on marketing materials such as pennants, stickers and team programs. The original 1967 California Seals logo recolored in green and gold was often seen on trading cards and other unofficial material, but was never adopted by the team. The Seals are remembered for wearing white skates, but initially Torrey convinced Finley to use green and gold painted skates instead, as team-colored skates were a trend of the period. The Seals finished with the worst record in the NHL that year. Finley's Seals pioneered putting player names on the back of the jerseys, an innovation copied by other NHL teams. Finley was the first owner to allow players to fly first class on commercial flights to games, thus starting a trend that ultimately culminated in NHL teams regularly chartering aircraft by the 21st century. The Seals regularly used the new Boeing 747 planes. Finley also introduced the flamboyant green and gold "Seals luggage" which all players and coaches were required to carry. On May 22, 1970, the Seals traded their 1971 first-round pick to the Montreal Canadiens along with Francois Lacombe in return for Montreal's 1970 first-round pick (Seals selected Chris Oddleifson), Ernie Hicke, and cash. As a result of the Seals' dreadful 1970–71 season, the Canadiens had the top pick in the 1971 draft, and used it to select future Hall of Famer Guy Lafleur. This transaction was later called as one of the most one-sided deals in NHL history.

=== Under the ownership of the NHL and Mel Swig ===
The team rebounded in 1971–72, but the arrival of the World Hockey Association (WHA) wiped out most of those gains. Finley refused to match the WHA's contract offers, causing five of the team's top 10 scorers from the previous season to bolt to the new league. Devoid of any defensive talent save for goaltender Gilles Meloche, the Seals sank into last place again in 1972–73, where they would remain for the rest of their history. Although divisional restructuring in 1974–75 included a revamped format in which three teams in each division made the playoffs, the team's efforts were frustrated by their placement in the Adams Division, with the strong Sabres, Boston Bruins, and Toronto Maple Leafs. The Seals once again finished well out of playoff contention, and were the only team to lose at home to the expansion Washington Capitals.

Finley soon lost patience with his struggling team, especially given the contrast to his World Series champion Athletics. He tried to sell the Seals, but when no credible buyers came forward who were interested in keeping the team in the Bay Area, he sold the team back to the league for $6.585 million. A 1973 attempt by Finley to sell the team to Indianapolis interests who planned to move the team to that city was rejected by the NHL's Board of Governors.

In early 1975, newspapers reported that the Seals and Pittsburgh Penguins were to move to Denver and Seattle, respectively, in an arrangement that would have seen the two teams sold to groups in those cities that had already been awarded "conditional" franchises for the 1976–77 season. At the same time, the league announced that if the Seals' sale to the Denver group was not completed or new ownership found locally, the franchise would be liquidated at the end of the season.

The Denver arrangement fell through, and the league ran the Seals for more than a year until a group headed by San Francisco hotel magnate Melvin Swig bought the team on July 28, 1975, with the intention of moving the team to a proposed new arena in San Francisco. The team fell just short of the playoffs, and after a mayoral election, plans for the new arena were canceled. With a new arena out of the picture, the league dropped their objection to moving the franchise.

=== The end and aftermath ===
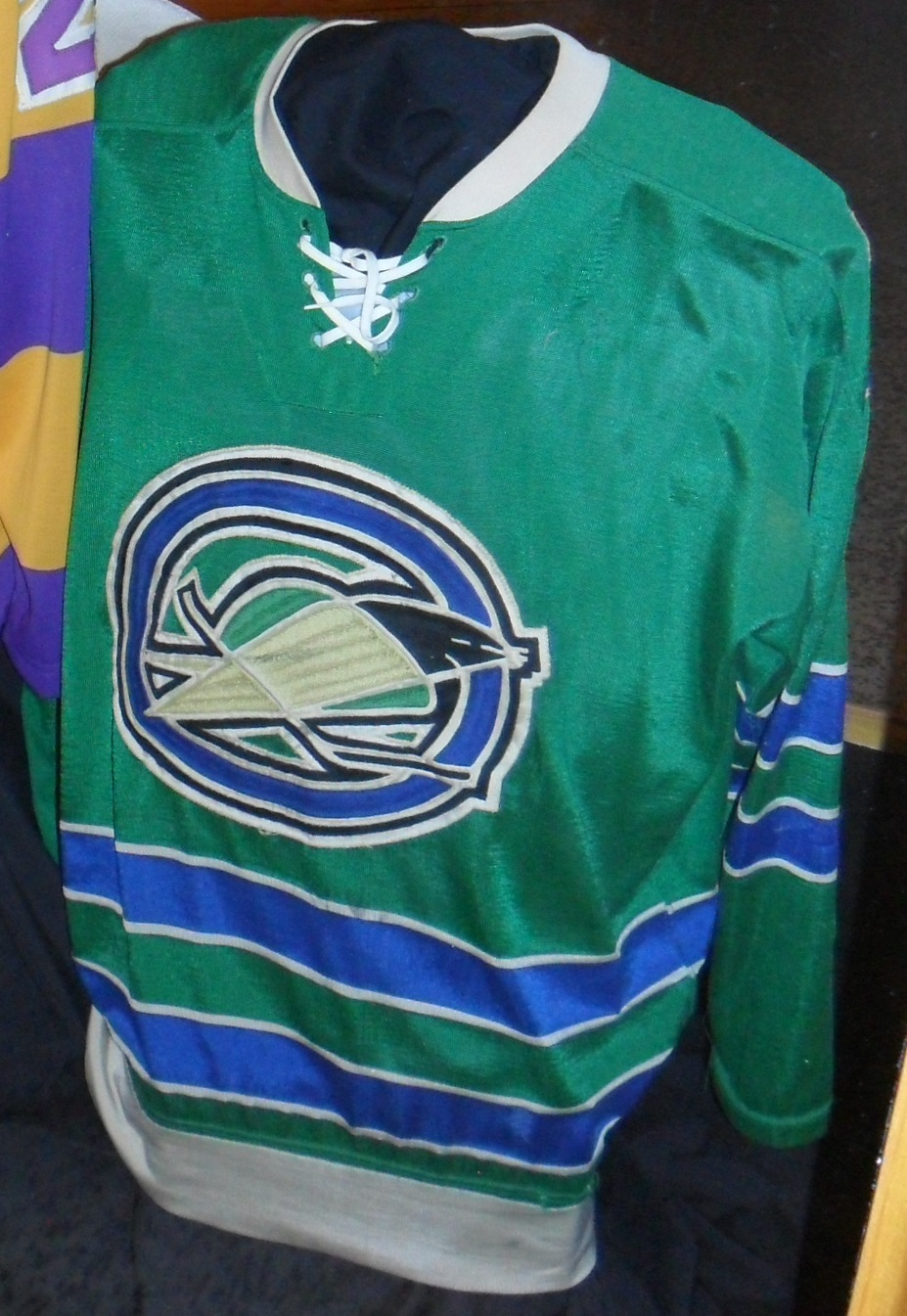
Oakland Seals jersey on display at the International Hockey Hall of Fame

Although attendance was finally showing some improvement and the team playing better, minority owners George and Gordon Gund persuaded Swig to seek approval to move the team to their hometown of Cleveland. The team's final game in Oakland was a 5–2 win over the Los Angeles Kings on April 4, 1976; league approval for the move was granted on July 14, and the team was renamed the Cleveland Barons after the city's former team in the American Hockey League (AHL).

Unfortunately, details were not finalized until less than six weeks before the start of the 1976–77 season, rendering the Barons all but invisible in Cleveland. After two more years of losses and with attendance worse than it had been in Oakland, the Gunds (by this time majority owners) were permitted to merge the Barons with the equally strapped Minnesota North Stars on June 14, 1978. The merged team continued as the Minnesota North Stars under the Gunds' ownership, but assumed the Barons' place in the Adams Division. The Barons became the last actively playing NHL team to fold since the Brooklyn Americans in 1942 (the franchise was formally cancelled in 1946) and the last team to cease operations since the Montreal Maroons had their franchise formally canceled in 1947 (though they had not iced a team since 1938). As a result, the NHL were reduced to 17 teams for the 1978–79 season.

In the late 1980s, the Gunds wanted to bring ice hockey back to the Bay Area and asked the NHL for permission to move the North Stars there. However, the league was unwilling to abandon a traditional ice hockey market like the Twin Cities. Meanwhile, a group led by former Hartford Whalers owner Howard Baldwin was pushing the NHL to bring a team to San Jose, where an arena was being built. Eventually, a compromise was struck whereby the Gunds would sell their share of the North Stars to Baldwin's group, with the Gunds receiving an expansion team in the Bay Area to begin play in the 1991–92 season, which was named the San Jose Sharks. In return, the Sharks would have the rights to players from the North Stars and then participate with the North Stars as an equal partner in an expansion draft with the new franchise. On May 5, 1990, the Gunds officially sold their share of the North Stars to Baldwin and were awarded a new team in the Bay Area that became the Sharks. Coincidentally, in their first two seasons in the league, the Sharks played their home games at the Cow Palace in Daly City (the same facility the NHL rejected as a home for the Seals in 1967), while their new permanent home arena in San Jose was being completed. Norman Green then joined Baldwin's ownership group and eventually bought controlling interest in the North Stars. Citing poor attendance and a poor arena deal at the Met Center, Green was able to move the team to Dallas after the 1992–93 season as the Dallas Stars.

== Legacy ==
Dennis Maruk was the last Seals player active in the NHL, retiring as a member of the North Stars in 1989. The last former Seals player in any league was George Pesut, who was active in Germany until 1994.

Though no longer an active team, the Seals remained a popular subject, and are the subject of multiple works. In 2006, Brad Kurtzberg published the first book on the Seals franchise, Shorthanded: The Untold Story of the Seals: Hockey's Most Colorful Team. In January 2017, filmmaker Mark Greczmiel released his documentary, The California Golden Seals Story on iTunes. In 2016, the Seals tribute website was launched to help promote the November 2017 release of the book, The California Golden Seals: A Tale of White Skates, Red Ink, and One of the NHL's Most Outlandish Teams, which covered the Seals' and Barons' entire history, including their six years in the WHL.

The San Jose Sharks unveiled their Reverse Retro jersey based on the final years of the Golden Seals on October 20, 2022.

== Season-by-season record ==
Note: GP = Games played, W = Wins, L = Losses, T = Ties, Pts = Points, GF = Goals for, GA = Goals against, PIM = Penalties in minutes

Season	Team	GP	W	L	T	Pts	GF	GA	PIM	Finish	Playoffs
1967–68	1967–68 (Note: Named California Seals from October 11 to November 6, 1967, and then played as Oakland Seals.)	74	15	42	17	47	153	219	787	6th in West	Did not qualify
1968–69	1968–69	76	29	36	11	69	219	251	811	2nd in West	Lost in quarterfinals (Kings), 3–4
1969–70	1969–70	76	22	40	14	58	169	243	845	4th in West	Lost in quarterfinals (Penguins), 0–4
1970–71	1970–71 (Note: Started season as Bay Area Seals and then renamed to California Golden Seals after two games.)	78	20	53	5	45	199	320	937	7th in West	Did not qualify
1971–72	1971–72	78	21	39	18	60	216	288	1,007	6th in West	Did not qualify
1972–73	1972–73	78	16	46	16	48	213	323	840	8th in West	Did not qualify
1973–74	1973–74	78	13	55	10	36	195	342	651	8th in West	Did not qualify
1974–75	1974–75	80	19	48	13	51	212	316	1,101	4th in Adams	Did not qualify
1975–76	1975–76	80	27	42	11	65	250	278	1,058	4th in Adams	Did not qualify
Moved to Cleveland
Total		698	182	401	115	479	1,826	2,580	8,037		

== Players and personnel ==
=== Hall of Fame members ===
- Harry Howell, 1969–1971, inducted 1979
- Bert Olmstead, 1967–1968, inducted 1985 (as player)
- Craig Patrick, 1971–1974, inducted 2001 (as builder)
- Bill Torrey, 1970, 1995 (inducted as builder)

=== Team captains ===
The Golden Seals had the following team captains:

- Bobby Baun, 1967–1968
- Ted Hampson, 1968–1971
- Carol Vadnais, 1971–1972
- Bert Marshall, 1972–1973
- Joey Johnston, 1974–1975
- Jim Neilson and Bob Stewart, 1975–1976 (co-captains)

=== NHL All-Star Game selections ===
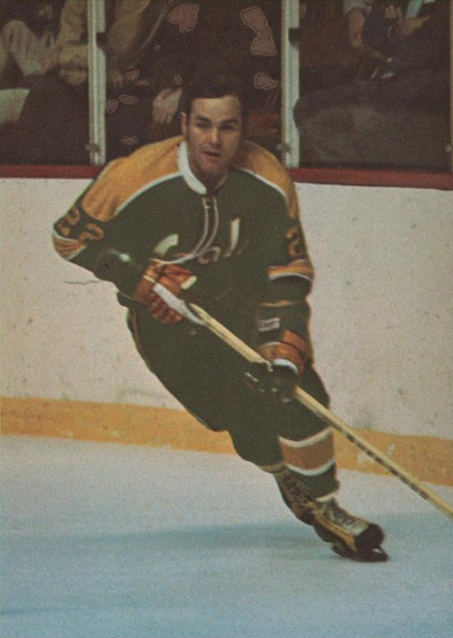
Joey Johnston in 1971 photo for the team; he was one of only two three-time All-Stars for the Seals

- Bobby Baun: 1967–68
- Ted Hampson: 1968–69
- Bill Hicke: 1968–69
- Carol Vadnais: 1968–69, 1969–70, 1971–72
- Harry Howell: 1969–70
- Doug Roberts: 1970–71
- Joey Johnston: 1972–73, 1973–74, 1974–75
- Al MacAdam: 1975–76

=== General managers ===
- Rudy Pilous, 1967 (fired before start of season)
- Bert Olmstead, 1967–1968 (resigned in March 1968)
- Frank Selke Jr., 1968–1970 (resigned in November 1970)
- Bill Torrey, 1970 (resigned in December 1970)
- Fred Glover, 1970–1971 (fired in October 1971)
- Garry Young, 1971–1972 (fired in November 1972)
- Fred Glover, 1972–1974 (resigned in February 1974)
- Garry Young, 1974 (given title of director of hockey operations due to NHL ownership of club; resigned before start of 1974–75 season)
- Bill McCreary Sr., 1974–1976 (given title of director of hockey operations from 1974 to 1975, while club under ownership of NHL; later became general manager in the summer of 1975 after Melvin Swig bought the club from the league)

=== First-round draft picks ===
- 1967: Ken Hicks (third overall)
- 1969: Tony Featherstone (seventh overall)
- 1970: Chris Oddleifson (10th overall)
- 1974: Rick Hampton (third overall)
- 1975: Ralph Klassen (third overall)
- 1976: Bjorn Johansson (fifth overall)

== Franchise records ==
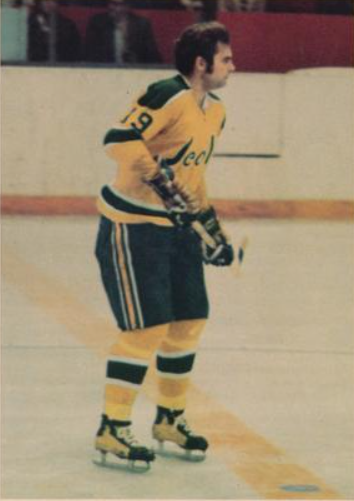
1971-72 photo of Bert Marshall for the Golden Seals; he played 313 games for the team, the most for the franchise

=== Scoring leaders ===
These are the top-ten point-scorers in franchise history.

Points
Player	Pos	GP	G	A	Pts	PIM
Joey Johnston	LW	288	84	101	185	308
Ted Hampson	C	246	61	123	184	37
Bill Hicke	RW	262	79	101	180	155
Gerry Ehman	RW	297	69	86	155	56
Carol Vadnais	D	246	63	83	146	560
Norm Ferguson	RW	279	73	66	139	72
Walt McKechnie	C	197	50	87	137	112
Ivan Boldirev	C	191	52	77	129	134
Gary Jarrett	LW	268	54	71	125	111
Gary Croteau	RW	270	47	76	123	47

=== Individual records ===
==== Career records ====
- Most games played – Bert Marshall (313)
- Most goals – Joey Johnston (84)
- Most assists – Ted Hampson (123)
- Most points – Joey Johnston (185)
- Most penalty minutes – Carol Vadnais (560)
- Most wins by a goaltender – Gary Smith (61)
- Most losses by a goaltender – Gilles Meloche (140)
- Lowest goals against average (GAA) by a goaltender – Charlie Hodge (3.10)
- Most shutouts by a goaltender – Gary Smith (9)
- Most minutes – Gilles Meloche (14,578)
- Most wins by a coach – Fred Glover (71)
- Most losses by a coach – Fred Glover (130)

==== Single season records ====
- Most goals – Norm Ferguson, 34 (1968–69)
- Most assists – Ted Hampson, 49 (1973–74)
- Most points – Ted Hampson, 75 (1968–69)
- Most penalty minutes – Dennis Hextall, 217 (1970–71)
- Most wins by a goaltender – Gary Smith, 21 (1968–69)
- Most losses by a goaltender – Gary Smith, 48 (1970–71)
- Lowest goals against average (GAA) by a goaltender – Charlie Hodge, 2.87 (1967–68)
- Most shutouts by a goaltender – Gary Smith (1968–69) and Gilles Meloche (1971–72), 4
- Most minutes – Gary Smith, 3,974 (1970–71)

== Broadcasters ==
In 1967–68, KTVU 2 televised 12 games with Tim Ryan on play-by-play. In 1968–69, away games were broadcast on the radio by KEEN with Tim Ryan again on play-by-play. In 1969–70, Saturday and Sunday games were broadcast by KGO radio. Jim Gordon, Bill Schonely and Bill McColgan each did play-by-play alone on multiple games. Meanwhile, Harvey Wittenberg and Rick Weaver did one game each; Weaver did the playoffs. In 1970–71, Roy Storey worked play-by-play on KEEN radio (which would broadcast all games until the Seals left California) while Rick Weaver called 10 games on KTVU. In 1972–73, Joe Starkey called the games on KEEN radio while Jon Miller worked 15 games (all on delay) on KFTY 50. Starkey continued to call the Golden Seals games on KEEN in 1974–75 and 1975–76. In the Golden Seals' final season, three games were televised on KBHK-TV 44.

== See also ==
- List of California Golden Seals players
- List of California Golden Seals head coaches
- List of NHL players
- List of NHL seasons
- 1967 NHL expansion
