= Carol Vadnais =

Canadian ice hockey player (1945–2014)

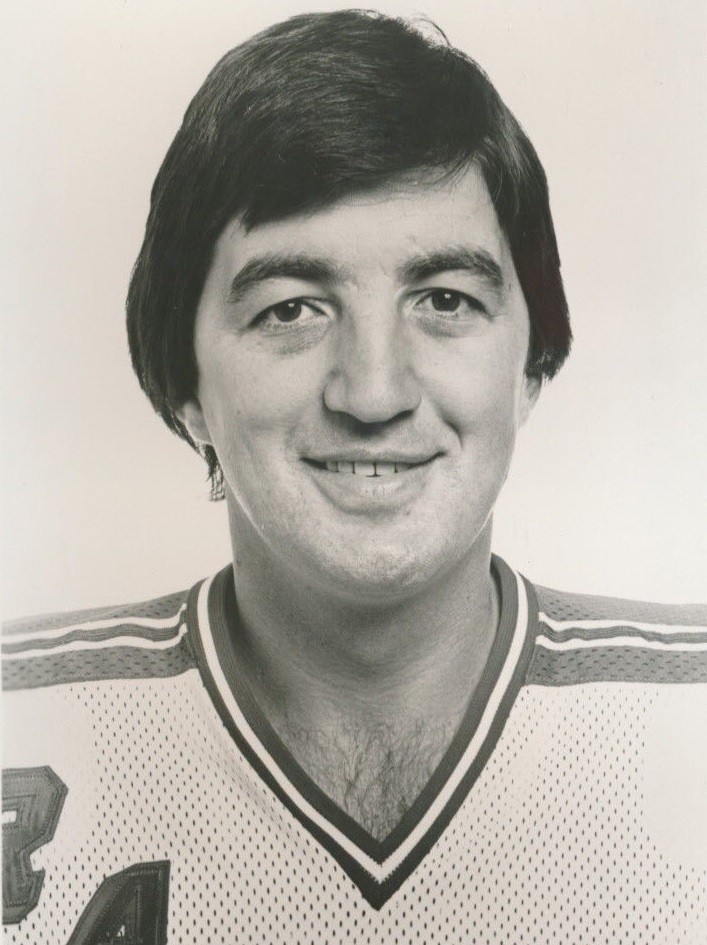
- Vadnais with the New York Rangers in 1978
- Born: September 25, 1945 Montreal, Quebec, Canada
- Died: August 31, 2014 (aged 68) Laval, Quebec, Canada
- Height: 6 ft 1 in (185 cm)
- Weight: 190 lb (86 kg; 13 st 8 lb)
- Position: Defence
- Shot: Left
- Played for: Montreal Canadiens; Oakland/California Golden Seals; Boston Bruins; New York Rangers; New Jersey Devils
- National team: Canada
- Playing career: 1966–1983

Carol Marcel Vadnais (September 25, 1945 – August 31, 2014) was a Canadian professional ice hockey defenceman who played 17 seasons in the National Hockey League (NHL) from 1966–67 until 1982–83. Vadnais won the Stanley Cup twice during his career, in 1968 with the Montreal Canadiens and again in 1972 with the Boston Bruins.

== Playing career ==
Originally a forward, Vadnais was shifted to defence in his final year of junior hockey with the Montreal Jr. Canadiens. In his first NHL training camp, he made the Montreal Canadiens lineup for the 1966-67 season. While the Canadiens were initially successful in not exposing Vadnais to the 1967 expansion draft, he was left unprotected after the 1967–68 season and would be claimed by the expansion Oakland Seals in the 1968 NHL Intra-League Draft. He became the Seals' captain at the beginning of the 1971-72 season but was traded mid-season.

On February 23, 1972, Vadnais was acquired by the Boston Bruins in an attempt to bolster their blueline for a Stanley Cup run. The Bruins outbid Vadnais' old club, the Canadiens, to secure his services. The move paid off and Vadnais headed the Bruins' second defence pairing behind Bobby Orr's first unit, which helped the Bruins capture the 1972 Stanley Cup.

In 1972 Vadnais was arrested in a case of mistaken identity while the Boston Bruins were on a road trip in Philadelphia. FBI agents were convinced that they had found their suspect from a bank robbery that had happened earlier that afternoon, indicating Vadnais looked very similar to the robber. Eventually, Vadnais was let out of custody and given an apology.

Vadnais was involved in the November 7, 1975 blockbuster trade that sent him along with star forward Phil Esposito to the New York Rangers for Jean Ratelle and Brad Park. Vadnais went on to play seven seasons for the Rangers and one for the New Jersey Devils before retiring in 1983. Along with Wayne Cashman of the Bruins and Serge Savard of the Winnipeg Jets, he was one of players from the NHL's pre-expansion Original Six era whose NHL career lasted the longest; the Bruins and Jets both made the 1983 playoffs, extending Cashman's and Savard's careers into that post-season.

Vadnais played 1,087 career NHL games, scoring 169 goals and 418 assists for 587 points, as well as adding 1,813 penalty minutes. In his best statistical season (1974–75), he scored 18 goals and set career highs with 56 assists and 74 points. Vadnais participated in six NHL All-Star Games and was a member of Team Canada at the 1976 Canada Cup (but didn't play in the tournament) and 1977 World Ice Hockey Championships.

== Coaching career ==
Vadnais joined the Rangers' coaching staff as an assistant for the 1983–84 and 1984–85 seasons. This was followed by one season as the head coach of the Quebec Major Junior Hockey League's Verdun Junior Canadiens, after which Vadnais left hockey for good.

== Personal ==
After hockey, Vadnais worked as a real estate agent in the Montreal area. His wife, Raymonde, died of cancer in 2004; they had one daughter, Michele.

Vadnais died of cancer on August 31, 2014, at the age of 68.

== Achievements ==
- In the 2009 book 100 Ranger Greats, was ranked No. 52 all-time of the 901 New York Rangers who had played during the team's first 82 seasons
- Stanley Cup champion (1968, 1972)
- Selected to National Hockey League All-Star Game (1969, 1970, 1972, 1975, 1976, 1978)
- In 2023, he was named one of the top 100 Bruins players of all time.

== Career statistics ==
=== Regular season and playoffs ===
			Regular season					Playoffs
Season	Team	League	GP	G	A	Pts	PIM	GP	G	A	Pts	PIM
1963–64	Montreal NDG Monarchs	MMJHL	44	39	49	88	90	17	7	15	22	34
1963–64	Montreal NDG Monarchs	M-Cup	—	—	—	—	—	13	13	11	24	12
1964–65	Montreal Jr. Canadiens	OHA	56	9	16	25	74	7	1	0	1	13
1965–66	Montreal Jr. Canadiens	OHA	48	9	14	23	184	10	1	4	5	24
1966–67	Montreal Canadiens	NHL	11	0	3	3	35	1	0	0	0	2
1966–67	Houston Apollos	CPHL	21	5	5	10	45	—	—	—	—	—
1967–68	Montreal Canadiens	NHL	31	1	1	2	31	1	0	0	0	0
1967–68	Houston Apollos	CPHL	36	5	21	26	178	—	—	—	—	—
1968–69	Oakland Seals	NHL	76	15	27	42	151	7	1	4	5	10
1969–70	Oakland Seals	NHL	76	24	20	44	212	4	2	1	3	15
1970–71	California Golden Seals	NHL	42	10	16	26	91	—	—	—	—	—
1971–72	California Golden Seals	NHL	52	14	20	34	106	—	—	—	—	—
1971–72	Boston Bruins	NHL	16	4	6	10	37	15	0	2	2	43
1972–73	Boston Bruins	NHL	78	7	24	31	127	5	0	0	0	8
1973–74	Boston Bruins	NHL	78	16	43	59	123	16	1	12	13	42
1974–75	Boston Bruins	NHL	79	18	56	74	129	3	5	6	0
1975–76	Boston Bruins	NHL	12	2	5	7	17	—	—	—	—	—
1975–76	New York Rangers	NHL	64	20	30	50	104	—	—	—	—	—
1976–77	New York Rangers	NHL	74	11	37	48	131	—	—	—	—	—
1977–78	New York Rangers	NHL	80	6	40	46	115	3	0	2	2	16
1978–79	New York Rangers	NHL	77	8	37	45	86	18	2	9	11	13
1979–80	New York Rangers	NHL	66	3	20	23	118	9	1	2	3	6
1980–81	New York Rangers	NHL	74	3	20	23	91	14	1	3	4	26
1981–82	New York Rangers	NHL	50	5	6	11	45	10	1	0	1	4
1982–83	New Jersey Devils	NHL	51	2	7	9	64	—	—	—	—	—
NHL totals			1,087	169	418	587	1,813	106	10	40	50	185

=== International ===
Year	Team	Event	GP	G	A	Pts	PIM
1977	Canada	WC	10	1	3	4	33
Senior totals			10	1	3	4	33

== See also ==
- List of NHL players with 1,000 games played

Preceded by Ted Hampson	California Golden Seals captain 1971–72	Succeeded by Bert Marshall
