= Ernie Hicke =

Canadian ice hockey player

- Born: November 7, 1947 (age 78) Regina, Saskatchewan, Canada
- Height: 5 ft 11 in (180 cm)
- Weight: 180 lb (82 kg; 12 st 12 lb)
- Position: Left wing
- Shot: Left
- Played for: Oakland Seals; Atlanta Flames; New York Islanders; Minnesota North Stars; Los Angeles Kings
- Playing career: 1963–1980

Ernest Allan Hicke (/ˈhɪkiː/ HIK-ee; born November 7, 1947) is a Canadian former professional ice hockey forward who played in the National Hockey League (NHL) with the Oakland Seals, Atlanta Flames, New York Islanders, Minnesota North Stars and Los Angeles Kings.

He left the NHL after the 1978 season, then retired as an active player at end of the 1980 season.

== Playing career ==
Born in Regina, Saskatchewan, Hicke's hockey career began with the Regina Pats, where he played junior hockey. After five years, Hicke's first professional appearance was with the Houston Apollos of the Central Hockey League (CHL). In Hicke's first three professional seasons, he scored 45 goals and 63 assists in 139 games. Originally a member of the Montreal Canadiens organization, Hicke was traded to the Oakland Seals in the deal that included the draft pick the Canadiens used to draft Guy Lafleur. Hicke's NHL career started with the Seals in 1970, where he joined his older brother, Bill, and played 146 games, producing 33 goals and 37 assists. He was then claimed in the 1972 NHL Expansion Draft by the Atlanta Flames. After a single season in Atlanta, he was traded to the Flames' expansion partners, the New York Islanders. Hicke played 76 games with New York, but only managed to score 21 points for the team, the worst scoring slump of his career. Hicke's production improved after being traded to the Minnesota North Stars, with 68 goals and 53 assists. After four seasons with the North Stars, Hicke was signed by the Los Angeles Kings. He left the NHL after the 1978 season and went to play for the CHL's Dallas Black Hawks. Hicke ended his hockey career with another 8 goals and 24 assists, before he retired as a player after the 1980 season.

== Post-playing career ==
Hicke went on to coach the California North Stars, a San Francisco Bay Area youth hockey team, with his son Shane. Hicke is the former head coach, and general manager of the Port Huron Fighting Falcons. He served as a coach the DYHA Jr. Sundevils U14 A team in Tempe, Arizona in 2016–17.

== Career statistics ==
=== Regular season and playoffs ===
			Regular season					Playoffs
Season	Team	League	GP	G	A	Pts	PIM	GP	G	A	Pts	PIM
1963–64	Regina Pats	SJHL	41	10	16	26	22	19	11	11	22	44
1964–65	Regina Pats	SJHL	48	12	22	34	95	12	0	5	5	28
1965–66	Regina Pats	SJHL	51	39	62	101	151	5	3	6	9	10
1966–67	Regina Pats	CMJHL	55	37	66	103	184	16	7	12	19	60
1967–68	Houston Apollos	CHL	67	16	20	36	142	—	—	—	—	—
1968–69	Houston Apollos	CHL	72	29	43	72	146	3	0	0	0	7
1969–70	Salt Lake Golden Eagles	WHL	65	29	26	55	83	—	—	—	—	—
1970–71	California Golden Seals	NHL	78	22	25	47	62	—	—	—	—	—
1971–72	California Golden Seals	NHL	68	11	12	23	55	—	—	—	—	—
1972–73	Atlanta Flames	NHL	58	14	23	37	37	—	—	—	—	—
1972–73	New York Islanders	NHL	1	0	0	0	0	—	—	—	—	—
1973–74	New York Islanders	NHL	55	6	7	13	26	—	—	—	—	—
1974–75	New York Islanders	NHL	20	2	6	8	40	—	—	—	—	—
1974–75	Minnesota North Stars	NHL	42	15	13	28	51	—	—	—	—	—
1975–76	Minnesota North Stars	NHL	80	23	19	42	77	—	—	—	—	—
1976–77	Minnesota North Stars	NHL	77	30	20	50	41	2	1	0	1	0
1977–78	Los Angeles Kings	NHL	41	9	15	24	18	—	—	—	—	—
1977–78	Binghamton Dusters	AHL	21	6	18	24	6	—	—	—	—	—
1977–78	Springfield Indians	AHL	7	0	1	1	2	—	—	—	—	—
1978–79	Dallas Black Hawks	CHL	39	8	24	32	69	—	—	—	—	—
1979–80	Dallas Black Hawks	CHL	72	11	26	37	67	—	—	—	—	—
NHL totals			520	132	140	272	407	2	1	0	1	0
