= Joey Johnston =

Canadian ice hockey player and coach

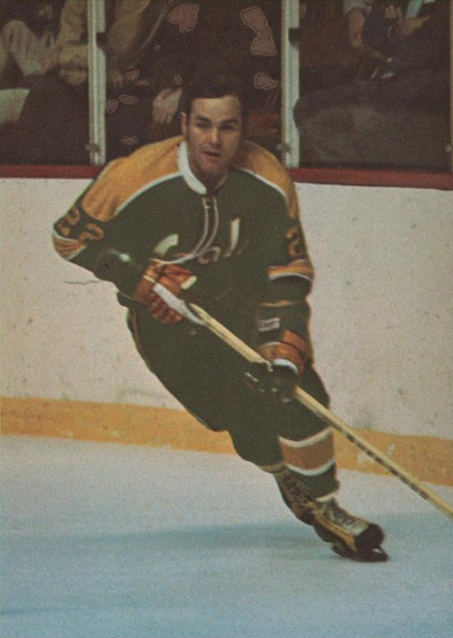
- Johnston in 1971 photo
- Born: March 3, 1949 (age 77) Peterborough, Ontario, Canada
- Height: 5 ft 10 in (178 cm)
- Weight: 180 lb (82 kg; 12 st 12 lb)
- Position: Left wing
- Shot: left
- Played for: Minnesota North Stars; California Golden Seals; Chicago Black Hawks
- NHL draft: 8th overall, 1966; New York Rangers
- Playing career: 1967–1976

Joseph John Johnston (born March 3, 1949) is a Canadian ice hockey coach and former professional player. Johnston played 331 games in the National Hockey League (NHL).

Born in Peterborough, Ontario, Canada, he played in the 1961 Quebec International Pee-Wee Hockey Tournament with his hometown youth team. He played junior hockey for the Peterborough Petes from 1964 to 1967. His play attracted the attention of the New York Rangers who selected him eighth in the 1966 Amateur Draft. He made his professional debut with the Rangers' American Hockey League affiliate Omaha Knights but was traded to the Minnesota North Stars in a trade for Dave Balon.

Johnston started his NHL career with the Minnesota North Stars in 1968, but spent most of his time in the minors until 1971–72, when he became a front-line player for the California Golden Seals. His high-water mark came during the 1972–73 season through 1973–74 season, when for a Golden Seals team savaged by defections to the World Hockey Association he rose to the forefront, leading the team in goals both seasons with 27 and 28 respectively and being named to play in the NHL All-Star Game in 1973, 1974 and 1975. As virtually the Seals' only star, he was named team captain in the fall of 1973.

However, his production in the 1974–75 season was half that of the year before, and he was traded to the Chicago Black Hawks in June 1975. In August of that year, Johnston was injured in a car crash. The injuries caused him to miss the Chicago training camp and the first 12 games of the season. His scoring touch deserted completely, managing only five assists in 32 games, and he finished the season in the minor leagues, retiring thereafter at the age of 27.

He finished his NHL career with 85 goals and 106 assists for 191 points in 331 games, adding 320 penalty minutes, and is the all-time leading point scorer for the defunct California Golden Seals with 185 points in 288 games for the Golden Seals. He returned to Peterborough and took up coaching while working as a contractor. His brother Jim also played professional ice hockey, playing several seasons in the International Hockey League.

== Career statistics ==
			Regular season					Playoffs
Season	Team	League	GP	G	A	Pts	PIM	GP	G	A	Pts	PIM
1964–65	Peterborough Monsens	EJHL	—	—	—	—	—	—	—	—	—	—
1964–65	Peterborough Petes	OHA-Jr.	3	0	0	0	0	—	—	—	—	—
1965–66	Peterborough Petes	OHA-Jr.	44	8	15	23	91	6	0	0	0	10
1966–67	Peterborough Petes	OHA-Jr.	32	8	19	27	114	6	1	3	4	28
1967–68	Buffalo Bisons	AHL	1	0	0	0	0	—	—	—	—	—
1967–68	Omaha Knights	CPHL	70	24	22	46	131	—	—	—	—	—
1968–69	Minnesota North Stars	NHL	11	1	0	1	6	—	—	—	—	—
1968–69	Memphis South Stars	CHL	58	20	37	57	91	—	—	—	—	—
1969–70	Iowa Stars	CHL	62	20	37	57	115	11	4	6	10	38
1970–71	Cleveland Barons	AHL	72	27	47	74	142	8	7	4	11	24
1971–72	California Golden Seals	NHL	77	15	17	32	107	—	—	—	—	—
1972–73	California Golden Seals	NHL	71	28	21	49	62	—	—	—	—	—
1973–74	California Golden Seals	NHL	78	27	40	67	67	—	—	—	—	—
1974–75	California Golden Seals	NHL	62	14	23	37	72	—	—	—	—	—
1975–76	Chicago Black Hawks	NHL	32	0	5	5	6	—	—	—	—	—
1975–76	Dallas Black Hawks	CHL	11	4	2	6	4	—	—	—	—	—
CPHL/CHL totals			201	68	98	166	341	11	4	6	10	38
NHL totals			331	85	106	191	320	—	—	—	—	—

Preceded by Bert Marshall	California Golden Seals captain 1973–75	Succeeded by Jim Neilson; Bob Stewart
