= Gilles Meloche =

Canadian ice hockey player, coach, and scout

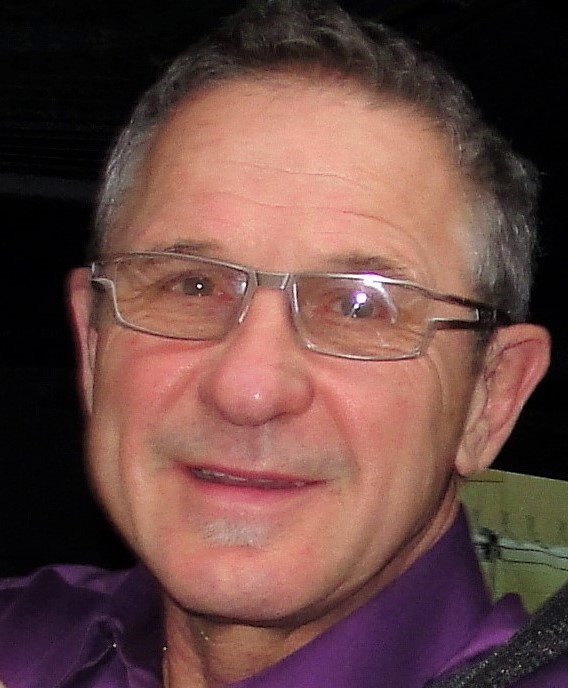
- Meloche during his stint the Pittsburgh Penguins in 2012
- Born: July 12, 1950 (age 76) Montreal, Quebec, Canada
- Height: 5 ft 8 in (173 cm)
- Weight: 170 lb (77 kg; 12 st 2 lb)
- Position: Goaltender
- Caught: Left
- Played for: Chicago Black Hawks; California Golden Seals; Cleveland Barons; Minnesota North Stars; Pittsburgh Penguins
- NHL draft: 70th overall, 1970; Chicago Black Hawks
- Playing career: 1970–1988
Medal record
Representing Canada
Ice hockey
World Championships
Bronze medal – third place	1982 Finland

Gilles Emile Meloche (born July 12, 1950) is a Canadian professional ice hockey coach, scout and former player. Meloche played as a goaltender in the National Hockey League (NHL) for the Chicago Black Hawks, California Golden Seals, Cleveland Barons, Minnesota North Stars and Pittsburgh Penguins. He is currently a special assignment scout for the Pittsburgh Penguins. Until 2013 he was the team's longtime goaltending coach, during which time the team won three Stanley Cups. Meloche was born in Montreal, Quebec.

== Playing career ==
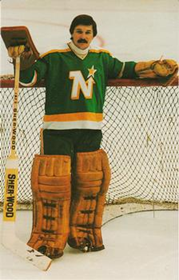
1981 photo of Meloche for Minnesota North Stars

After playing junior hockey with the Verdun Maple Leafs, and loaned to the Quebec Remparts at the 1970 Memorial Cup, Meloche was the 70th selection in the 1970 amateur draft, chosen by the Chicago Black Hawks. His first professional season was spent mostly with the Flint Generals in the International Hockey League, with a two-game stint with Chicago. The Black Hawks were strong in goal with Tony Esposito, so Meloche was dealt to the California Golden Seals, one of the weakest teams in the league. In his first season with the Seals in 1971–72, he recorded a strong goals-against average of 3.33 and four shutouts, including one against the Boston Bruins, then a league powerhouse. The Seals' fortunes continued to worsen but Meloche continued to play well as the club's number one goaltender. He faced a barrage of rubber for another four seasons, including the Seals' relocation as the Cleveland Barons. For the next two seasons, Meloche solidly backstopped the Barons, with only a slight improvement in the team.

Following the Barons' merger with the Minnesota North Stars in 1978, Meloche was Minnesota's primary goalie and experienced his greatest success there. He spent eight seasons with the North Stars and appeared in the NHL All-Star game in 1980 and 1982. Minnesota experienced success in the playoffs as well, with an appearance in the Stanley Cup Final in 1981 and the semi-final in 1980 and 1984. Meloche also became the first goaltender in NHL history to wear a modern full fiberglass cage during the Stanley Cup Final.

Despite leading the North Stars with 32 starts in the 1984–85 season, the 34-year old Meloche was getting a significant push from fellow netminders Don Beaupre and Roland Melanson, who was acquired from the New York Islanders during the season. With his contract up and two much younger netminders under contract, Meloche's rights were traded to the Edmonton Oilers. With Grant Fuhr and Andy Moog firmly entrenched in the Oilers' net, the trade was an odd fit and not surprisingly, Meloche was on the move again without ever playing a game for Edmonton. Prior to the 1985–86 season the Oilers sent Meloche to Pittsburgh in the deal that landed Marty McSorley in Edmonton.

Meloche spent his final three seasons as the Penguins' starting goalie before retiring following the 1987–88 season.

In total, Meloche played in 788 NHL regular season games over nineteen seasons with a GAA of 3.64 and 20 shutouts. Largely because of his stint with the dreadful Seals and Barons, he ranks fourth on the list of goalies with most losses with 351, only behind Martin Brodeur, Roberto Luongo and Curtis Joseph. He appeared in 45 playoff games and registered a GAA of 3.48 with 2 shutouts.

Following his retirement from playing, Meloche served as a Penguins scout from 1989 to 2006 and also served as a goaltending coach/consultant during much of that time. He was on the staff when the Penguins won Stanley Cups in 1991, 1992 and 2009. Meloche and his wife, Sophie, reside in Pittsburgh. His son, Eric, is a professional ice hockey player who played 74 NHL games between 2000 and 2007 for the Pittsburgh Penguins and Philadelphia Flyers.

== Awards and achievements ==
- NHL All-Star Game (1980, 1982)

== Career statistics ==
=== Regular season and playoffs ===
Bold indicates led league

			Regular season									Playoffs
Season	Team	League	GP	W	L	T	MIN	GA	SO	GAA	SV%	GP	W	L	MIN	GA	SO	GAA	SV%
1969–70	Verdun Jr. Maple Leafs	QMJHL	45	—	—	—	2679	221	1	4.95	.882	11	5	6	654	34	0	3.12	.921
1969–70	Quebec Remparts	M-Cup	—	—	—	—	—	—	—	—	—	8	4	4	474	35	0	4.43	—
1970–71	Chicago Black Hawks	NHL	2	2	0	0	120	6	0	3.00	.917	—	—	—	—	—	—	—	—
1970–71	Flint Generals	IHL	33	—	—	—	1866	104	2	3.34	—	3	—	—	183	11	0	3.61	—
1971–72	California Golden Seals	NHL	56	16	25	13	3121	173	4	3.33	.893	—	—	—	—	—	—	—	—
1972–73	California Golden Seals	NHL	**59**	19	32	**14**	**3473**	**235**	1	4.06	.885	—	—	—	—	—	—	—	—
1973–74	California Golden Seals	NHL	47	9	**33**	5	2800	198	1	4.24	.877	—	—	—	—	—	—	—	—
1974–75	California Golden Seals	NHL	47	9	27	10	2771	186	1	4.03	.877	—	—	—	—	—	—	—	—
1975–76	California Golden Seals	NHL	41	12	23	6	2440	140	1	3.44	.888	—	—	—	—	—	—	—	—
1976–77	Cleveland Barons	NHL	51	19	24	6	2961	171	2	3.47	.890	—	—	—	—	—	—	—	—
1977–78	Cleveland Barons	NHL	54	16	27	8	3100	195	1	3.77	.887	—	—	—	—	—	—	—	—
1978–79	Minnesota North Stars	NHL	53	20	25	7	3118	173	2	3.33	.885	—	—	—	—	—	—	—	—
1979–80	Minnesota North Stars	NHL	54	27	20	5	3141	160	1	3.06	.897	11	5	4	564	34	1	3.62	.885
1980–81	Minnesota North Stars	NHL	38	17	14	6	2215	120	2	3.25	.889	13	8	5	802	47	0	3.52	.884
1981–82	Minnesota North Stars	NHL	51	26	15	9	3026	175	1	3.47	.894	4	1	2	184	8	0	2.61	.908
1982–83	Minnesota North Stars	NHL	47	20	13	11	2689	160	1	3.57	.887	5	2	3	319	18	0	3.39	.882
1983–84	Minnesota North Stars	NHL	52	21	17	8	2883	201	2	4.18	.868	4	1	2	200	11	0	3.30	.875
1984–85	Minnesota North Stars	NHL	32	10	13	6	1817	115	0	3.80	.879	8	4	3	395	25	1	3.80	.902
1985–86	Pittsburgh Penguins	NHL	34	13	15	5	1989	119	0	3.59	.881	—	—	—	—	—	—	—	—
1986–87	Pittsburgh Penguins	NHL	43	13	19	7	2343	134	0	3.43	.881	—	—	—	—	—	—	—	—
1987–88	Pittsburgh Penguins	NHL	27	8	9	5	1390	95	0	4.10	.868	—	—	—	—	—	—	—	—
NHL totals			788	270	351	131	45,397	2756	20	3.64	.885	45	21	19	2464	143	2	3.48	.889

=== International ===
Year	Team	Event	Result	GP	W	L	T	MIN	GA	SO	GAA
1982	Canada	WC	3rd place, bronze medalist(s)	5	3	2	0	299	16	1	3.21

"Meloche's stats". The Goaltender Home Page.
