= Bill Hicke =

Canadian ice hockey player

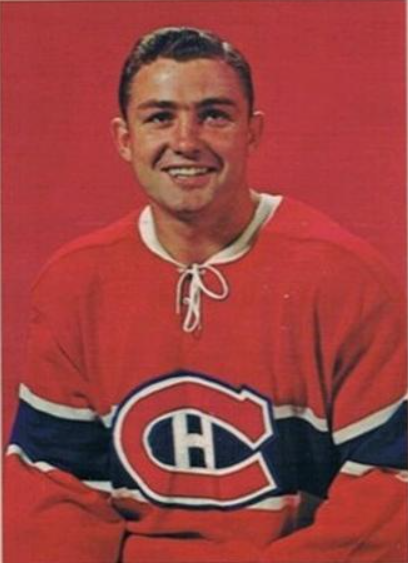
- Hicke in 1963 card
- Born: March 31, 1938 Regina, Saskatchewan, Canada
- Died: July 18, 2005 (aged 67) Regina, Saskatchewan, Canada
- Height: 5 ft 8 in (173 cm)
- Weight: 164 lb (74 kg; 11 st 10 lb)
- Position: Right wing
- Shot: Left
- Played for: Montreal Canadiens; New York Rangers; Oakland Seals; California Golden Seals; Pittsburgh Penguins; Alberta Oilers
- Playing career: 1954–1973

William Lawrence Hicke (March 31, 1938 – July 18, 2005) was a Canadian professional ice hockey right winger. A native of Regina, Saskatchewan, Hicke played 14 seasons in the National Hockey League (NHL) for the Montreal Canadiens, New York Rangers, Oakland Seals/California Golden Seals and Pittsburgh Penguins, winning the Stanley Cup with Montreal in 1959 and 1960. Hicke's younger brother is Ernie Hicke.

== Playing career ==
Hicke played junior hockey with the Regina Pats in the Saskatchewan Junior Hockey League (SJHL) from 1954 to 1958, Memorial Cup runners-up for three of those years. He joined the Montreal Canadiens from 1958 to 1965, including stints for Montreal's American Hockey League (AHL) affiliate the Rochester Americans during the 1958–59 and 1959-60 seasons, and the Cleveland Barons during 1964-65. Traded to the New York Rangers in 1964, he had stints with the Minnesota Rangers in 1965-66 and the Baltimore Clippers in 1966-67, but remained a Rangers product until being drafted by the Oakland Seals in the 1967 NHL Expansion Draft. Hicke played for the Seals until a 1971 trade to the Pittsburgh Penguins. In November 1971 Hicke was traded to the Detroit Red Wings but never played for the parent club, instead joining their affiliates the Tidewater Wings and Fort Worth Wings from 1971 to 1972. Hicke then played a single season for the World Hockey Association (WHA) Alberta Oilers in 1972-73 before retiring as a player.

== Coaching career ==
From 1993 to 1994, Hicke coached and managed the Regina Pats. In 2005, he was awarded the WHL's Governor Award. Hicke died in his native Regina, Saskatchewan, at the age of 67, after a lengthy battle with cancer.

== Awards and achievements ==
- 1959 Dudley "Red" Garrett Memorial Award winner (Rochester) (AHL)
- 1959 John B. Sollenberger Trophy winner (Rochester)
- 1959 Les Cunningham Award winner (Rochester)
- 1959 Stanley Cup Championship (Montreal) (NHL)
- 1960 Stanley Cup Championship (Montreal)
- 1959 NHL All-Star (Montreal)
- 1960 NHL All-Star (Montreal)
- 1969 NHL All-Star (Oakland)
- 1995 Saskatchewan Sports Hall of Fame inductee

== Career statistics ==
			Regular season					Playoffs
Season	Team	League	GP	G	A	Pts	PIM	GP	G	A	Pts	PIM
1954–55	Regina Pats	WCJHL	8	3	9	12	7	14	6	8	14	4
1954–55	Regina Pats	MC	—	—	—	—	—	15	5	13	18	8
1955–56	Regina Pats	WCJHL	36	33	9	42	51	10	6	8	14	10
1955–56	Regina Pats	MC	—	—	—	—	—	19	11	18	29	44
1956–57	Regina Pats	SJHL	53	52	48	100	94	7	5	5	10	14
1957–58	Regina Pats	SJHL	49	54	43	97	144	12	9	10	19	20
1957–58	Regina Pats	MC	—	—	—	—	—	16	18	8	26	31
1958–59	Rochester Americans	AHL	69	41	56	97	41	5	1	1	2	12
1958–59	Montreal Canadiens	NHL	—	—	—	—	—	1	0	0	0	0
1959–60	Rochester Americans	AHL	14	8	5	13	22	—	—	—	—	—
1959–60	Montreal Canadiens	NHL	43	3	10	13	17	7	1	2	3	0
1960–61	Montreal Canadiens	NHL	70	18	27	45	31	5	2	0	2	19
1961–62	Montreal Canadiens	NHL	70	20	31	51	42	6	0	2	2	14
1962–63	Montreal Canadiens	NHL	70	17	22	39	39	5	0	0	0	0
1963–64	Montreal Canadiens	NHL	48	11	9	20	41	7	0	2	2	2
1964–65	Cleveland Barons	AHL	6	3	2	5	2	—	—	—	—	—
1964–65	Montreal Canadiens	NHL	17	0	1	1	6	—	—	—	—	—
1964–65	New York Rangers	NHL	40	6	11	17	26	—	—	—	—	—
1965–66	New York Rangers	NHL	49	9	18	27	21	—	—	—	—	—
1965–66	Minnesota Rangers	CPHL	3	2	0	2	4	—	—	—	—	—
1966–67	Baltimore Clippers	AHL	18	14	14	28	15	9	6	8	14	23
1966–67	New York Rangers	NHL	48	3	4	7	11	—	—	—	—	—
1967–68	Oakland Seals	NHL	52	21	19	40	32	—	—	—	—	—
1968–69	Oakland Seals	NHL	67	25	36	61	68	7	0	3	3	4
1969–70	Oakland Seals	NHL	69	15	29	44	14	4	0	1	1	2
1970–71	California Golden Seals	NHL	74	18	17	35	41	—	—	—	—	—
1971–72	Pittsburgh Penguins	NHL	12	2	0	2	6	—	—	—	—	—
1971–72	Tidewater Wings	AHL	16	4	2	6	6	—	—	—	—	—
1971–72	Fort Worth Wings	CHL	34	9	10	19	51	7	0	5	5	12
1972–73	Alberta Oilers	WHA	73	14	24	38	20	1	0	0	0	0
NHL totals			729	168	234	402	395	42	3	10	13	41
WHA totals			73	14	24	38	20	1	0	0	0	0

== See also ==
- List of family relations in the NHL
