= Ted Hampson =

Canadian ice hockey player

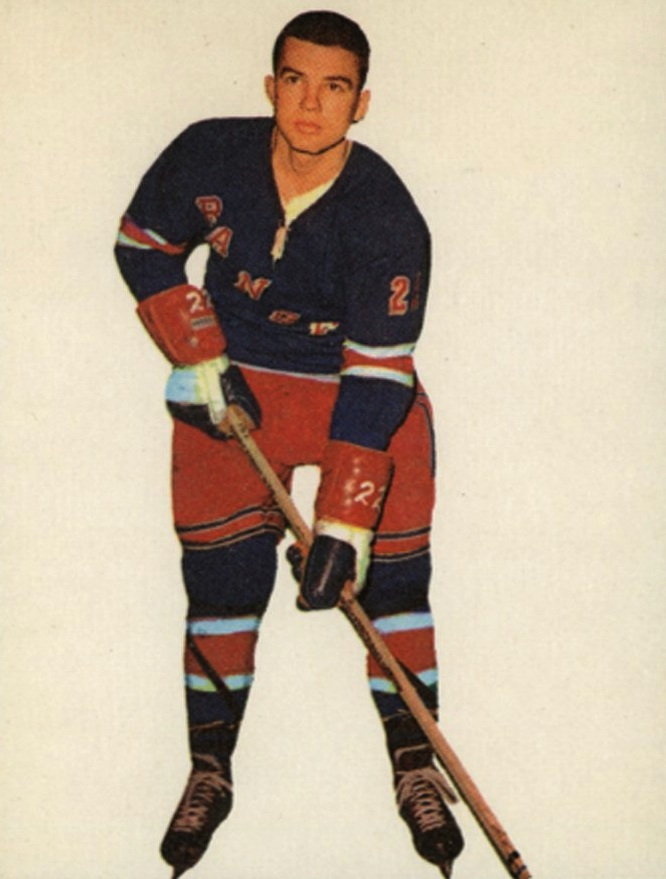
- Born: December 11, 1936 (age 89) Togo, Saskatchewan, Canada
- Height: 5 ft 8 in (173 cm)
- Weight: 165 lb (75 kg; 11 st 11 lb)
- Position: Centre
- Shot: Left
- Played for: Toronto Maple Leafs; New York Rangers; Detroit Red Wings; Oakland Seals; California Golden Seals; Minnesota North Stars; Minnesota Fighting Saints; Quebec Nordiques (WHA)
- Playing career: 1959–1976

Edward George Hampson (born December 11, 1936) is a Canadian former professional ice hockey centre, who played in the National Hockey League and World Hockey Association during the 1960s and 70s. Ted is the father of Gord Hampson.

== Career ==
Hampson, as captain of the Flin Flon Bombers, won the Memorial Cup in 1957, a significant achievement for a small-town hockey team in Northern Manitoba playing in the SJHL.

Hampson was drafted by the Toronto Maple Leafs and began his professional career in 1959. Hampson was awarded the Bill Masterton Memorial Trophy in 1969 while playing for the Oakland Seals. He retired from the National Hockey League (NHL) following the 1971–72 season and went on to play five seasons in the World Hockey Association (WHA). The WHA awarded him the Paul Deneau Trophy (Most Gentlemanly Player) in 1973 as a member of the Minnesota Fighting Saints. Hampson recorded 108 goals, 245 assists, 353 points, and a mere 94 penalty minutes in 676 NHL games. In 305 WHA appearances, Hampson tallied 60 goals, 143 assists, 203 points, and 51 penalty minutes. Hampson was the Captain of the Oakland Seals (NHL) and the Minnesota Fighting Saints (WHA).

Hampson was the general manager and player-coach for the Oklahoma City Stars of the Central Hockey League from 1978 to 1981; at the age of 45 in his final stint, he was one of the oldest men ever to play professional hockey. After his playing career, Hampson began a long-time amateur scouting career that spanned another 40 years. He started with Central Scouting, led the amateur scouting for the St. Louis Blues and Colorado Avalanche, and then joined the Vancouver Canucks, whom he scouted for until retiring in July 2022 at the age of 85.

== Career statistics ==
=== Regular season and playoffs ===
			Regular season					Playoffs
Season	Team	League	GP	G	A	Pts	PIM	GP	G	A	Pts	PIM
1953–54	Flin Flon Bombers	SJHL	—	—	—	—	—	1	1	0	1	0
1953–54	Flin Flon Bombers	M-Cup	—	—	—	—	—	2	1	1	2	0
1954–55	Flin Flon Bombers	SJHL	13	6	6	12	4	—	—	—	—	—
1955–56	Flin Flon Bombers	SJHL	48	51	62	113	16	12	9	12	21	4
1955–56	Flin Flon Bombers	M-Cup	—	—	—	—	—	7	5	1	6	2
1956–57	Flin Flon Bombers	SJHL	55	48	70	118	37	10	6	13	19	4
1956–57	Flin Flon Bombers	M-Cup	—	—	—	—	—	17	7	17	24	6
1956–57	Brandon Regals	WHL	2	1	3	4	0	—	—	—	—	—
1957–58	Providence Reds	AHL	70	15	25	40	22	5	0	2	2	0
1958–59	Vancouver Canucks	WHL	66	27	41	68	23	9	1	4	5	0
1959–60	Rochester Americans	AHL	29	6	18	24	9	12	2	4	6	2
1959–60	Toronto Maple Leafs	NHL	41	2	8	10	17	—	—	—	—	—
1960–61	New York Rangers	NHL	69	6	14	20	4	—	—	—	—	—
1961–62	New York Rangers	NHL	68	4	24	28	10	6	0	1	1	0
1962–63	Baltimore Clippers	AHL	22	12	14	26	4	3	1	2	3	0
1962–63	New York Rangers	NHL	46	4	2	6	2	—	—	—	—	—
1963–64	Detroit Red Wings	NHL	7	0	1	1	0	—	—	—	—	—
1963–64	Pittsburgh Hornets	AHL	66	15	33	48	6	5	2	2	4	0
1964–65	Detroit Red Wings	NHL	1	0	0	0	0	—	—	—	—	—
1964–65	Pittsburgh Hornets	AHL	64	15	39	54	39	4	1	2	3	2
1965–66	Pittsburgh Hornets	AHL	72	20	29	49	6	3	1	0	1	0
1966–67	Pittsburgh Hornets	AHL	7	1	4	5	2	—	—	—	—	—
1966–67	Detroit Red Wings	NHL	65	13	35	48	4	—	—	—	—	—
1967–68	Detroit Red Wings	NHL	37	9	18	27	10	—	—	—	—	—
1967–68	Oakland Seals	NHL	34	8	19	27	4	—	—	—	—	—
1968–69	Oakland Seals	NHL	76	26	49	75	6	7	3	4	7	2
1969–70	Oakland Seals	NHL	76	17	35	52	13	4	1	1	2	0
1970–71	California Golden Seals	NHL	60	10	20	30	14	—	—	—	—	—
1970–71	Minnesota North Stars	NHL	18	4	6	10	4	11	3	3	6	0
1971–72	Minnesota North Stars	NHL	78	5	14	19	6	7	0	1	1	0
1972–73	Minnesota Fighting Saints	WHA	77	17	45	62	20	6	3	1	4	0
1973–74	Minnesota Fighting Saints	WHA	77	17	38	55	9	11	4	4	8	8
1974–75	Minnesota Fighting Saints	WHA	78	17	36	53	6	12	1	7	8	0
1975–76	Minnesota Fighting Saints	WHA	59	5	14	19	14	—	—	—	—	—
1975–76	Quebec Nordiques	WHA	14	4	10	14	2	5	0	2	2	10
1978–79	Oklahoma City Stars	CHL	23	2	7	9	4	—	—	—	—	—
1979–80	Oklahoma City Stars	CHL	3	0	1	1	0	—	—	—	—	—
1980–81	Oklahoma City Stars	CHL	6	0	0	0	12	—	—	—	—	—
WHA totals			305	60	143	203	51	34	8	14	22	18
NHL totals			676	108	245	353	94	35	7	10	17	2

== Awards and achievements ==
- SJHL First All-Star Team (1957)
- SJHL Championship (1957)
- Memorial Cup Championship (1957)
- Bill Masterton Trophy Winner (1969)
- Paul Deneau Trophy Winner (1973)
- Played in NHL All-Star Game (1969)
- Honoured Member of the Manitoba Hockey Hall of Fame

Preceded by Bobby Baun	Oakland Seals/California Golden Seals captain 1968–71	Succeeded by Carol Vadnais
Preceded by Claude Provost	Bill Masterton Trophy Winner; 1969	Succeeded by Pit Martin
