= Jim Neilson =

Canadian ice hockey player (1941–2020)

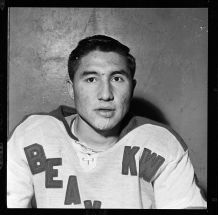
- Neilson in 1961
- Born: November 28, 1941 Big River, Saskatchewan, Canada
- Died: November 6, 2020 (aged 78) Winnipeg, Manitoba, Canada
- Height: 6 ft 2 in (188 cm)
- Weight: 205 lb (93 kg; 14 st 9 lb)
- Position: Defence
- Shot: Left
- Played for: New York Rangers; California Golden Seals; Cleveland Barons; Edmonton Oilers
- Playing career: 1962–1979

James Anthony Neilson (November 28, 1941 – November 6, 2020) also known as "The Chief", to colleagues and friends, was an indigenous Canadian professional ice hockey defenceman who played over 1000 games in the National Hockey League (NHL) for the New York Rangers, California Golden Seals, and Cleveland Barons. He ended his career playing 35 games with the Edmonton Oilers, which were in the World Hockey Association (WHA) at the time.

== Early life ==
Neilson was born in Big River, Saskatchewan on November 28, 1941. His mother, Rosie Rediron, was Cree from the Big River First Nation and his father, Olaf Neilson, was of a mink rancher who had immigrated from Denmark in the late 1920s. When he was five years old he and his two sisters were taken in at the St. Patrick’s Orphanage in Prince Albert, Saskatchewan. He first began playing hockey during his time living at the orphanage.

== Career ==
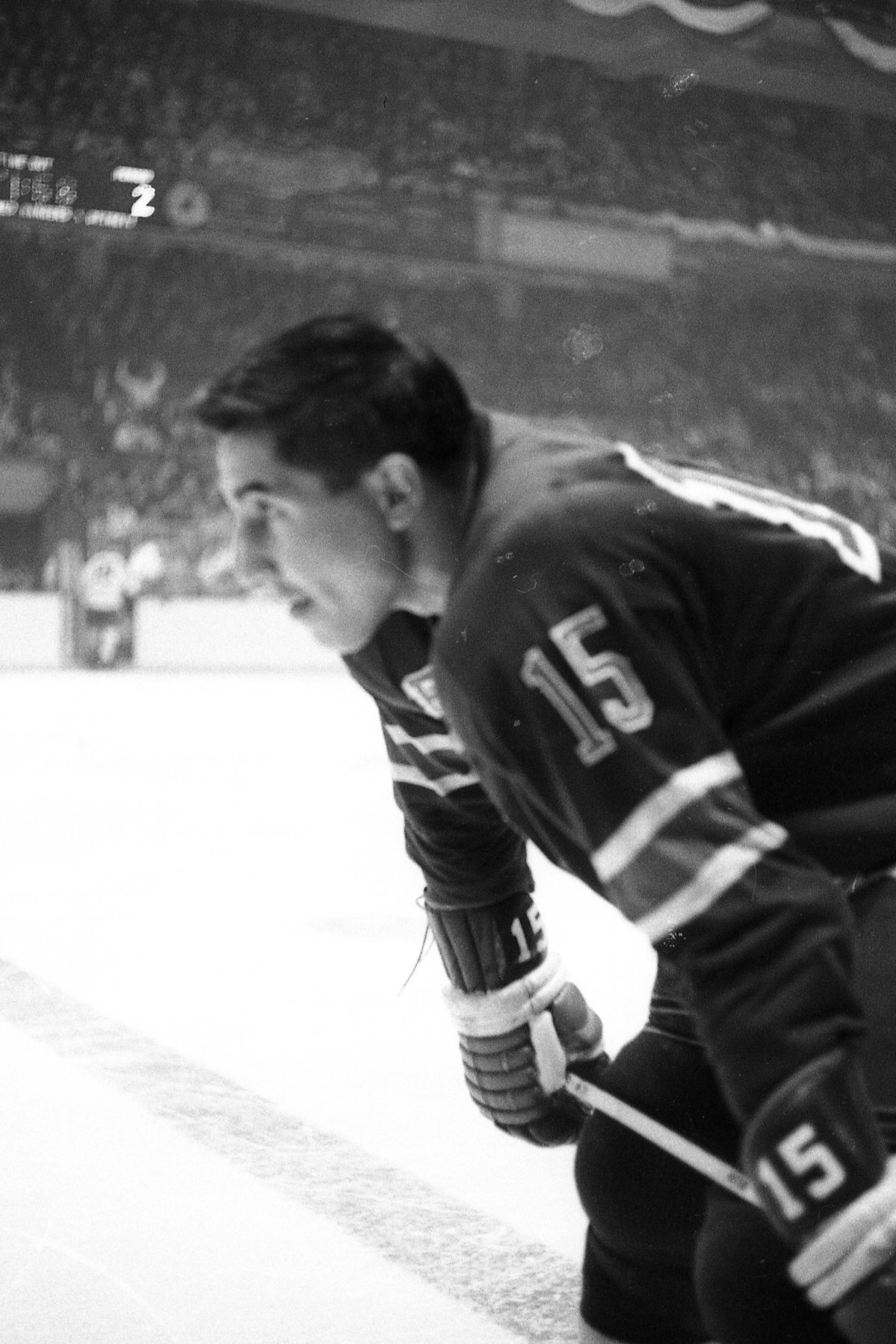
Neilson with the New York Rangers in 1965

From age 17 to 19, Neilson played three seasons of Junior A hockey for the Prince Albert Mintos in the Saskatchewan Junior Hockey League. He scored 21 goals and 33 assists in 57 games as a defenseman in his first year of junior. This was enough for professional scouts to determine that this six-foot-two, 205-pound defenceman, could add depth, grit, and talent to an NHL roster. In August of 1961, He was invited to try out for the New York Rangers but subsequently did not make the 1961-62 Rangers roster, instead, he continued to improve and play for an associated Ranger's minor league team, the Kitchener-Waterloo Beavers in the EPHL, where he put up a respectable 42 points in 70 games. He was named the EPHL's 1961 rookie of the year, selected by sports journalists in league cities. The following year, Neilson made the opening night roster for the New York Rangers where he would play the next twelve seasons. In the 1967-68 season, he was nominated for the Norris Trophy, the annual award for the best defenseman in the National Hockey League. He placed second in the voting and was runner-up to the winner for that season, Bobby Orr. He was traded by the Rangers before the 1974-75 NHL season to the fledgling California Golden Seals, which played out of the Bay Area in California.

At the time, Neilson brought an abundance of experience and leadership to what was one of the youngest NHL rosters in the league and was a welcome addition to the Seals' blue line. He was paired up on defense with George Pesut, a young and highly talented, but inexperienced defenseman playing in his first NHL season. Pesut was a high NHL and WHA draft pick in 1973 from the Saskatoon Blades, and like Neilson, had grown up in Saskatchewan. Neilson's experience and mentoring were a driving force for Pesut to grow his talent, which he outlines in his upcoming memoir, "The Fourth Period: Between The Ice Sheets".

Neilson was also named captain of the Seals and named the Seals' Most Valuable Player in the 1975-76 season.

Neilson played for 16 seasons in the NHL, 12 of which were with Rangers. During his career in the NHL he played 1,023 games, scoring a total of 69 goals, logging 299 assists, and earning 368 points. He played from 1962–63 season to 1977–78 season in the NHL. After the Seals relocated to Cleveland in 1976, Neilson played two more seasons for the struggling Cleveland Barons which eventually folded into merging with the Minnesota North Stars. During his NHL career, he played in two all-star games (1967, 1971) and was a second-team all-star for the 1967-68 season. In his last season, Neilson played 35 games for the Edmonton Oilers in 1978–79 in the World Hockey Association.

In the 2009 book 100 Ranger Greats, the authors ranked Neilson at No. 42 all-time of the 901 New York Rangers who had played during the team's first 82 seasons.

Neilson was inducted into the Saskatchewan Sports Hall of Fame in 2018. Neilson died in Winnipeg on November 6, 2020.

== Personal life ==
Jim Neilson was an avid sportsman, including being a talented baseball player during the Saskatchewan summers, he enjoyed fishing and was also an excellent golfer. Neilson has three children and numerous grandchildren. After his hockey career as a player ended, he briefly scouted for the Edmonton Oilers, before moving to California for a business opportunity. In 1983, he relocated back to Winnipeg, Manitoba, taking up such causes as advancing the interests of indigenous peoples, continuing to play oldtimer hockey, and spending time traveling to see his children and grandchildren. He lived in Winnipeg until his passing. Jim Neilson died of complications from a rare skin disorder at age 78.

== Career statistics ==
=== Regular season and playoffs ===
			Regular season					Playoffs
Season	Team	League	GP	G	A	Pts	PIM	GP	G	A	Pts	PIM
1958–59	Prince Albert Mintos	SJHL	10	1	2	3	6	—	—	—	—	—
1959–60	Prince Albert Mintos	SJHL	57	21	28	49	61	7	2	2	4	6
1960–61	Prince Albert Mintos	SJHL	59	20	26	46	59	—	—	—	—	—
1961–62	Kitchener Beavers	EPHL	70	9	33	42	78	7	2	3	5	2
1962–63	New York Rangers	NHL	69	5	11	16	38	—	—	—	—	—
1963–64	New York Rangers	NHL	69	5	24	29	93	—	—	—	—	—
1964–65	New York Rangers	NHL	62	0	13	13	58	—	—	—	—	—
1965–66	New York Rangers	NHL	65	4	19	23	84	—	—	—	—	—
1966–67	New York Rangers	NHL	62	4	11	15	65	4	1	0	1	0
1967–68	New York Rangers	NHL	67	6	29	35	60	6	0	2	2	4
1968–69	New York Rangers	NHL	76	10	34	44	95	4	0	3	3	5
1969–70	New York Rangers	NHL	62	3	20	23	75	6	0	1	1	8
1970–71	New York Rangers	NHL	77	8	24	32	69	13	0	3	3	30
1971–72	New York Rangers	NHL	78	7	30	37	56	10	0	3	3	8
1972–73	New York Rangers	NHL	52	4	16	20	35	10	0	4	4	2
1973–74	New York Rangers	NHL	72	4	7	11	38	12	0	1	1	4
1974–75	California Golden Seals	NHL	72	3	17	20	56	—	—	—	—	—
1975–76	California Golden Seals	NHL	26	1	6	7	20	—	—	—	—	—
1976–77	Cleveland Barons	NHL	72	3	17	20	42	—	—	—	—	—
1977–78	Cleveland Barons	NHL	68	2	21	23	20	—	—	—	—	—
1978–79	Edmonton Oilers	WHA	35	0	5	5	18	—	—	—	—	—
WHA totals			35	0	5	5	18	—	—	—	—	—
NHL totals			1,024	69	299	368	904	65	1	17	18	61

== See also ==
- List of NHL players with 1,000 games played

Preceded by Joey Johnston	California Golden Seals/Cleveland Barons captain 1975–1978 with Bob Stewart	Succeeded by Merged with Minnesota North Stars
