= Dennis Maruk =

Canadian ice hockey player

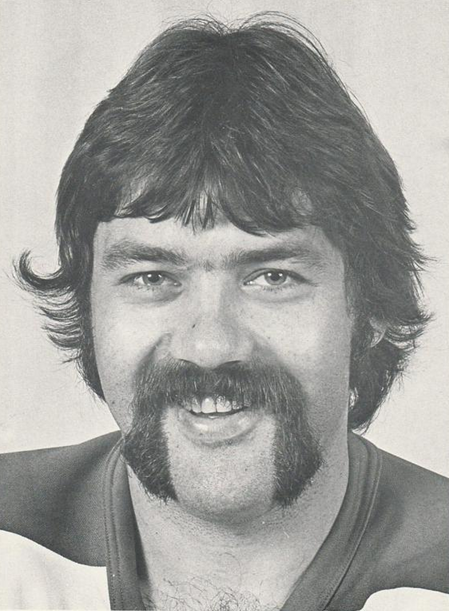
- Born: November 17, 1955 (age 70) Toronto, Ontario, Canada
- Height: 5 ft 8 in (173 cm)
- Weight: 165 lb (75 kg; 11 st 11 lb)
- Position: Centre
- Shot: Left
- Played for: California Golden Seals; Cleveland Barons; Minnesota North Stars; Washington Capitals
- National team: Canada
- NHL draft: 21st overall, 1975; California Golden Seals
- WHA draft: 65th overall, 1975; Cleveland Crusaders
- Playing career: 1975–1989
Medal record
Representing Canada
Ice hockey
World Championships
Bronze medal – third place	1978 Prague
Bronze medal – third place	1983 West Germany

Dennis John Maruk (born November 17, 1955) is a Canadian former professional ice hockey player. He played in the National Hockey League (NHL) from 1975 to 1989, scoring a career-high 60 goals for the Washington Capitals in 1981–82. Maruk is of Ukrainian descent.

== Career ==
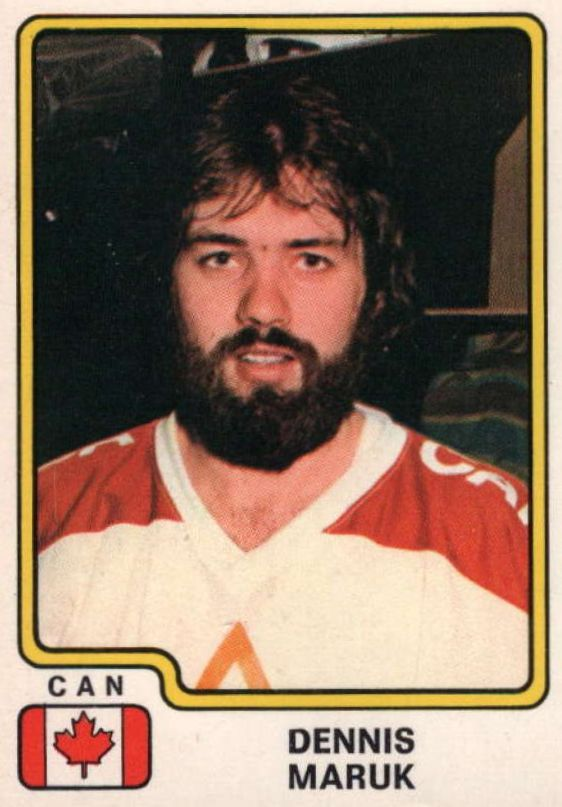
Maruk in 1979

As a youth, Maruk played in the 1968 Quebec International Pee-Wee Hockey Tournament with a minor ice hockey team from Etobicoke.

Maruk played junior "A" hockey in the Ontario Hockey League (OHL) for the London Knights before he was drafted in the 1975 NHL Amateur Draft by the California Golden Seals. His first goal came in Toronto at Maple Leaf Gardens to the delight of his family and friends that attended the game. While with the Seals, he became the first NHL rookie to score five shorthanded goals in a season. Maruk followed the franchise when it relocated to Cleveland to become the Cleveland Barons a year later.

Maruk's rights were later obtained by the Minnesota North Stars after the Barons merged with them in 1978, but he was traded on October 17 Washington Capitals for a first round pick. During his time with the Capitals, he scored 50 goals in 1980–81 and 60 goals in 1981–82; his mark of 76 assists and 136 points in the 1981–82 season remain franchise records for a single-season. Maruk was the first Capitals player to score 100 points in a season. Dubiously, Maruk set a new record as the first 60-goal scorer to play on a team that missed the playoffs (he would later be surpassed by Mario Lemieux in 1988). For a time, Maruk had a distinct "Fu Manchu" mustache, which was inspired by seeing Al Hrabosky on television playing with one.

In 1982–83, Maruk was one of the players instrumental in leading the Capitals to their first playoff appearance. Despite this, he was traded back to the North Stars on July 5, 1983 where he finished his career. At the time of his retirement in 1989, he was the last active NHL player to have played for the Seals/Barons franchise, although Charlie Simmer played later than him in minor leagues. Maruk was also the last Minnesota North Stars player to wear the number 9 prior to Mike Modano.

In 888 NHL games, he scored 356 goals and had 522 assists for a total of 878. For all retired players who played less than 1,000 career games, Maruk ranks 12th all-time. For a time, Maruk was a coach with Roller Hockey International and even inserted himself into a game. Ten years after his NHL career ended, at the age of 43, he was living in Lake Charles when the team in the Western Professional Hockey League (WPHL) asked him to help the team by playing a few shifts, and he decided to oblige them and wound up playing six games.

In 2017, Maruk worked with Ken Reid on a book titled Dennis Maruk: The Unforgettable Story of Hockeys Forgotten 60-Goal Man.

== Career statistics ==
=== Regular season and playoffs ===
			Regular season					Playoffs
Season	Team	League	GP	G	A	Pts	PIM	GP	G	A	Pts	PIM
1971–72	Markham Waxers	MetJHL	—	—	—	—	—	—	—	—	—	—
1971–72	Toronto Marlboros	OHA-Jr.	8	2	1	3	4	—	—	—	—	—
1972–73	London Knights	OHA-Jr.	59	46	67	113	54	—	—	—	—	—
1973–74	London Knights	OHA-Jr.	67	47	65	112	61	—	—	—	—	—
1974–75	London Knights	OMJHL	65	66	79	145	53	—	—	—	—	—
1975–76	California Golden Seals	NHL	80	30	32	62	44	—	—	—	—	—
1976–77	Cleveland Barons	NHL	80	28	50	78	68	—	—	—	—	—
1977–78	Cleveland Barons	NHL	76	36	35	71	50	—	—	—	—	—
1978–79	Minnesota North Stars	NHL	2	0	0	0	0	—	—	—	—	—
1978–79	Washington Capitals	NHL	76	31	59	90	71	—	—	—	—	—
1979–80	Washington Capitals	NHL	27	10	17	27	8	—	—	—	—	—
1980–81	Washington Capitals	NHL	80	50	47	97	87	—	—	—	—	—
1981–82	Washington Capitals	NHL	80	60	76	136	128	—	—	—	—	—
1982–83	Washington Capitals	NHL	80	31	50	81	71	4	1	1	2	2
1983–84	Minnesota North Stars	NHL	71	17	43	60	42	16	5	5	10	8
1984–85	Minnesota North Stars	NHL	71	19	41	60	56	9	4	7	11	12
1985–86	Minnesota North Stars	NHL	70	21	37	58	67	5	4	9	13	4
1986–87	Minnesota North Stars	NHL	67	16	30	46	52	—	—	—	—	—
1987–88	Minnesota North Stars	NHL	22	7	4	11	15	—	—	—	—	—
1988–89	Minnesota North Stars	NHL	6	0	1	1	2	—	—	—	—	—
1988–89	Kalamazoo Wings	IHL	5	1	5	6	4	—	—	—	—	—
1998–99	Lake Charles Ice Pirates	WPHL	6	0	2	2	4	3	0	0	0	2
NHL totals			888	356	522	878	761	34	14	22	36	26

=== International ===
Year	Team	Event	GP	G	A	Pts	PIM
1978	Canada	WC	10	6	1	7	2
1979	Canada	WC	7	1	1	2	2
1981	Canada	WC	8	5	3	8	6
1983	Canada	WC	10	4	3	7	4
Senior totals			35	16	8	24	14
