= Bob Stewart (ice hockey) =

Canadian ice hockey player (1950–2017)

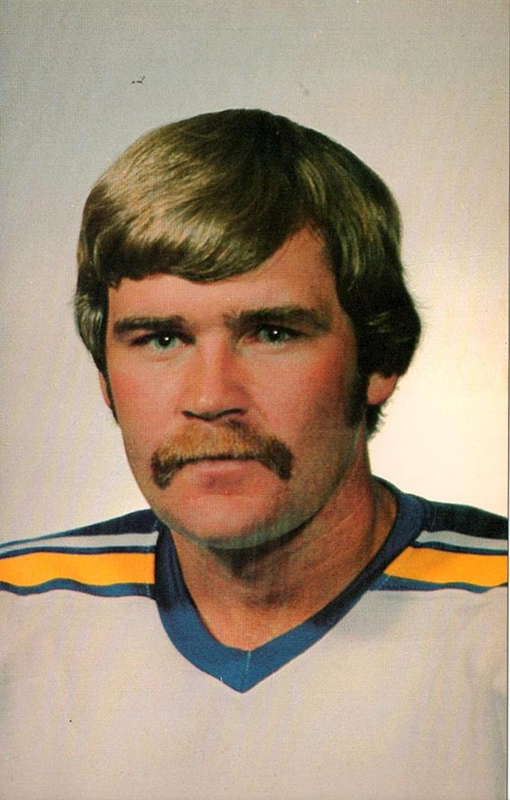
- Born: November 10, 1950 Charlottetown, Prince Edward Island, Canada
- Died: February 3, 2017 (aged 66) Creve Coeur, Missouri, U.S.
- Height: 6 ft 1 in (185 cm)
- Weight: 206 lb (93 kg; 14 st 10 lb)
- Position: Defence
- Shot: Left
- Played for: Boston Bruins; California Golden Seals; Cleveland Barons; St. Louis Blues; Pittsburgh Penguins
- NHL draft: 13th overall, 1970; Boston Bruins
- Playing career: 1971–1980

Robert Harold Stewart (November 10, 1950 – February 3, 2017) was a Canadian professional ice hockey defenceman who played nine seasons in the National Hockey League for the Boston Bruins, California Golden Seals, Cleveland Barons, St. Louis Blues and Pittsburgh Penguins.

== Playing career ==
Stewart was drafted in the first round, 13th overall by the Boston Bruins in the 1970 NHL entry draft. When he became an NHL player in the 1971-72 season, he was the seventh player from Prince Edward Island to play in the league as a skater.

Playing most of his career for poorly performing teams, his career plus-minus rating of minus 257 is the lowest total in NHL history among players for whom the statistic has been recorded; for players that played into the 21st century, only Mike Sillinger has gotten close with a rating of -191.

While with the Cleveland Barons, the team missed payroll in 1977. The Washington Post interviewed Stewart about the problems that caused. In his final season, spent between the St. Louis Blues and Pittsburgh Penguins (acquired for Blair Chapman in November) Stewart reached the Stanley Cup playoffs for the first and only time, where he scored one goal as the team lost in the first round.

In his years after hockey, he worked for Ralston-Purina and US Bank. In 2002, he was inducted into the PEI Sports Hall of Fame. When selecting an All-Time Team for PEI natives in 2017 Dave Holland and the PEI Sports Hall of Fame named Stewart to the second line for defence. He died at the age of 66 in 2017.

== Career statistics ==
			Regular season					Playoffs
Season	Team	League	GP	G	A	Pts	PIM	GP	G	A	Pts	PIM
1967–68	Oshawa Generals	OHA-Jr.	50	2	11	13	172	—	—	—	—	—
1968–69	Oshawa Generals	OHA-Jr.	52	7	32	39	226	—	—	—	—	—
1969–70	Oshawa Generals	OHA-Jr.	44	11	24	35	159	6	1	3	4	12
1970–71	Oklahoma City Blazers	CHL	61	6	16	22	270	5	0	1	1	23
1971–72	Boston Bruins	NHL	8	0	0	0	15	—	—	—	—	—
1971–72	Oklahoma City Blazers	CHL	10	1	3	4	34	—	—	—	—	—
1971–72	Boston Braves	AHL	39	1	7	8	102	—	—	—	—	—
1971–72	California Golden Seals	NHL	16	1	2	3	44	—	—	—	—	—
1972–73	California Golden Seals	NHL	63	4	17	21	181	—	—	—	—	—
1973–74	California Golden Seals	NHL	47	2	5	7	69	—	—	—	—	—
1974–75	California Golden Seals	NHL	67	5	12	17	93	—	—	—	—	—
1975–76	California Golden Seals	NHL	76	4	17	21	112	—	—	—	—	—
1976–77	Cleveland Barons	NHL	73	1	12	13	108	—	—	—	—	—
1977–78	Cleveland Barons	NHL	72	2	15	17	84	—	—	—	—	—
1978–79	St. Louis Blues	NHL	78	5	13	18	47	—	—	—	—	—
1979–80	St. Louis Blues	NHL	10	0	1	1	4	—	—	—	—	—
1979–80	Pittsburgh Penguins	NHL	65	3	7	10	52	5	1	1	2	2
NHL totals			575	27	101	128	809	5	1	1	2	2

Preceded by Ron Plumb	Boston Bruins first-round draft pick 1970	Succeeded by Ron Jones
Preceded by Joey Johnston	California Golden Seals/Cleveland Barons captain 1975–78 with Jim Neilson	Succeeded by Merged with Minnesota North Stars
