= Cleveland Barons (NHL) =

Former National Hockey League team (1976–1978)

- Founded: 1967
- History: California Seals; 1967; Oakland Seals; 1967–1970; Bay Area Seals (briefly) / California Golden Seals; 1970–1976; Cleveland Barons; 1976–1978
- Home arena: Richfield Coliseum
- City: Richfield, Ohio
- Team colors: Red, black, white

The Cleveland Barons were a professional ice hockey team based in Richfield, Ohio. They competed in the National Hockey League (NHL) as a member of the Adams Division in the Prince of Wales Conference (1976–1978). The Barons played at Richfield Coliseum. They were a relocation of the California Golden Seals franchise that had played in Oakland since 1967. After just two seasons, the team merged with the Minnesota North Stars (now the Dallas Stars). As a result, the NHL operated with 17 teams during the 1978–79 season.

Until 2024, the Barons were the last franchise in the NHL to cease operations. Ohio did not have another NHL team until the Columbus Blue Jackets joined the league 22 years later in 2000.

== History ==
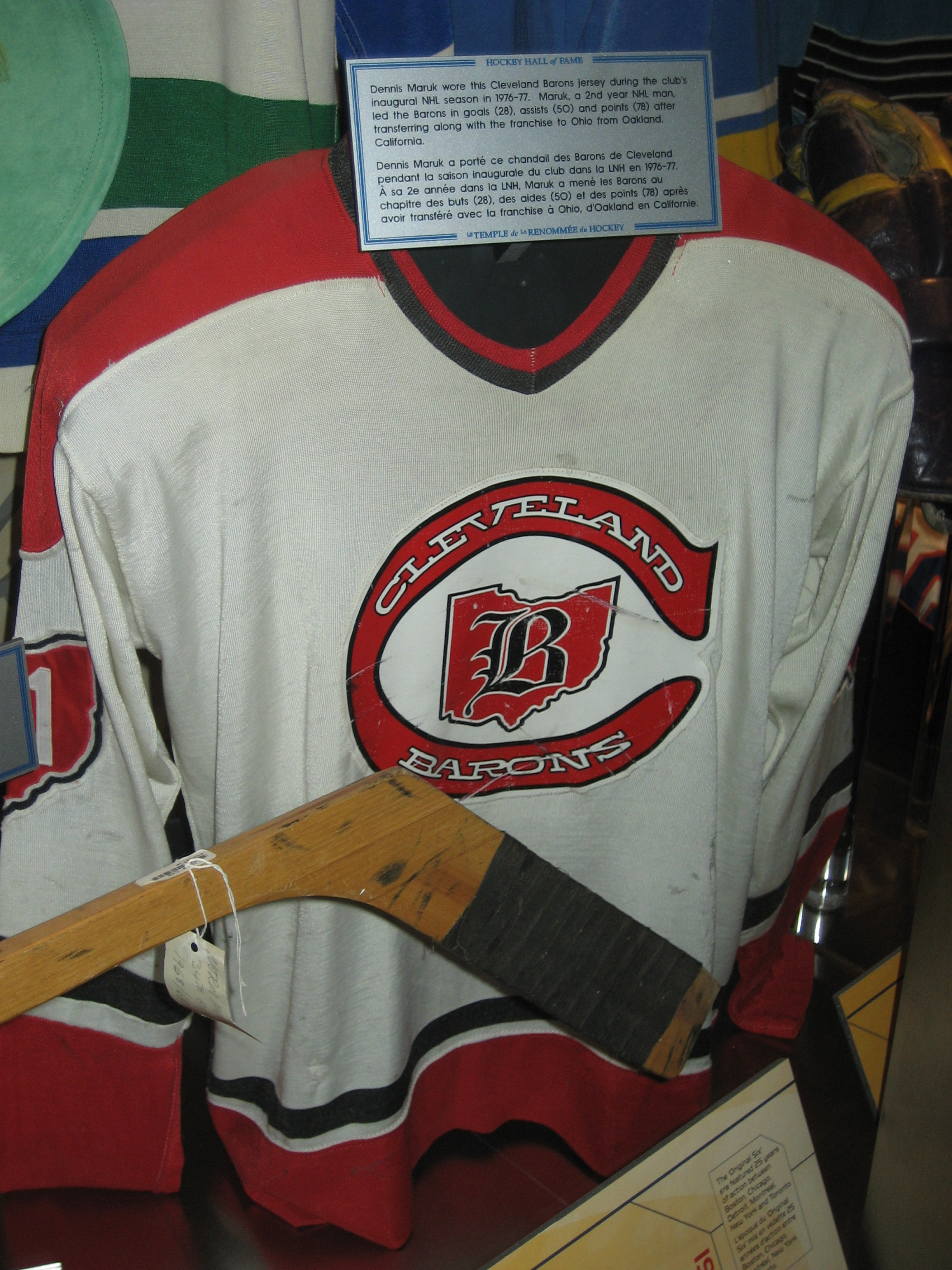
1976–77 Cleveland Barons home jersey at the Hockey Hall of Fame

The Barons originated as the California Golden Seals in the 1967 NHL expansion. Based at the Oakland-Alameda Coliseum Arena in Oakland, California; they were the least successful of the six teams added as part of that expansion. They never had a winning record and only made the playoffs twice. Those two seasons were the only times that the franchise came close to contention.

However, the Seals' on-ice struggles were the least of their concerns. The team was sold three times, and spent much of 1974 and 1975 as wards of the league. The team never drew well; attendance was so poor that talk of relocation began as early as the inaugural season. However, the league's U.S. television contract with CBS required two teams in California. Even after the NHL and CBS parted ways, the league was reluctant to abandon a market as large as the Bay Area.

San Francisco hotel magnate Melvin Swig bought the Seals from the league in 1975 for $3.5 million. Soon afterward, he hammered out a deal with San Francisco mayor Joseph Alioto to move the Seals to a new 17,000-seat arena in San Francisco. However, when those plans fell through later in 1975, the NHL dropped its remaining objection to moving the team. Minority owner George Gund III persuaded Swig to move the team to his hometown of Cleveland for the 1976–77 season. The team was named "Barons" in honor of the successful team in the American Hockey League (AHL) that played in the city from 1929 to 1973, winning nine Calder Cup titles. The AHL Barons' owner, Nick Mileti, moved that team to Florida in favor of his Cleveland Crusaders team in the new World Hockey Association (WHA).

The Barons played at the Richfield Coliseum in suburban Richfield, Ohio, halfway between Cleveland and Akron. It had originally been built for the WHA's Crusaders (who left to become the second incarnation of the Minnesota Fighting Saints for the 1976–77 WHA season on the Barons' arrival) and the Cleveland Cavaliers of the National Basketball Association (NBA). At the time, Richfield Coliseum had the largest seating capacity in the NHL at 18,544.

On paper, the move to Cleveland should have been a shot in the arm for the franchise. Cleveland had been mentioned as a possible NHL city as early as 1935, when the then-struggling Montreal Canadiens considered moving there. It had also been turned down for an NHL expansion team on three previous occasions, in the 1950s and 1960s. While the Seals were relatively isolated in California (their nearest opponents were the Los Angeles Kings and Vancouver Canucks), the Barons would have been within close proximity to the Pittsburgh Penguins (themselves struggling and even filing for bankruptcy in 1975), Buffalo Sabres and Detroit Red Wings, helping them form rivalries with those teams much like the longstanding rivalry between the Cleveland Browns and Pittsburgh Steelers and, to a lesser extent at the time, the college football rivalry between Ohio State and Michigan. Additionally, the Barons (and their previous incarnations, the Indians and Falcons) had been one of the pillars of the AHL and its predecessors for 44 years.

The NHL approved the move to Cleveland on July 14, 1976, but details were not finalized until late August, less than six weeks before the 1976–77 season. There was little time or money for promotion of the new team, and the Barons never recovered from this lack of visibility. They never came close to filling the Coliseum in their two years in Cleveland. The team's home opener on October 6, 1976, a 2-2 tie versus the Kings, drew only 8,900 fans. They drew 10,000 or more fans in only seven out of 40 home games. Attendance was worse than it had been in Oakland and the team did not draw as many fans as the WHA's Crusaders had. The Barons were also troubled by an unfavorable lease with the Coliseum.

During the All-Star break in January 1977, Swig hinted the Barons might not finish the season because of payroll difficulties. He asked the Board of Governors for a bailout. The board turned down Swig's request almost out of hand. At the time, no one in the NHL offices believed that the Barons' situation was nearly as dire as Swig claimed. While the WHA's history was packed with teams folding in mid-season, no NHL team had folded since the Montreal Maroons franchise was formally canceled in 1947 after not icing a team since 1938. No team had folded in mid-season since the Montreal Wanderers disbanded during the NHL's inaugural season in 1917–18 after their arena burned down. The situation quickly deteriorated. Amid $2.4 million in losses, team workers went unpaid for two months. Matters worsened in February, when Swig asked the players to take a 27 percent pay cut. The players turned this request down, and the team missed two payrolls. The league seriously considered folding the team and holding a dispersal draft for the players; by then, some of the Barons' players were actively being courted by other teams. By February 18, the players had lost their patience, and threatened to not take the ice for their game against the Colorado Rockies. Wanting to avoid the embarrassment of a player strike, as well as a team folding at mid-season, Swig, the league and the National Hockey League Players' Association (NHLPA) reached a last-minute deal to cover the players' salaries for the rest of the season. Swig contributed $350,000, the other 17 owners put up $20,000 each, and the NHLPA lent the team $600,000. After the team finished last in the Adams Division again, Swig sold his interest to Gund and his brother Gordon.

For 1977–78, the Gunds poured money into the team, and it seemed to make a difference at first. The Barons stunned the defending Stanley Cup champion Montreal Canadiens on November 23, 1977, winning 2-1 before a crowd of 12,859. After a brief slump, general manager Harry Howell pulled off several trades in an attempt to make the team tougher. It initially paid off, and the Barons knocked off three of the NHL's top teams, the New York Islanders, Buffalo Sabres, and Toronto Maple Leafs in games on three consecutive days in January 1978. A few weeks later, a record crowd of 13,110 saw the Barons tie Philadelphia Flyers 2–2 on February 4, 1978. It did not last; they only won a total of four games in February and March, crumbling to last place again.

== Merger and aftermath ==
The Gunds aggressively marketed the team, but got little to show for it. The Barons only attracted a total of 7,000 fans during their three-game winning streak in January 1978. They were also unable to get favorable deals for radio or television, denying them another potential revenue stream; getting nearby NHL teams like the Penguins (then invisible on the Pittsburgh sports scene compared to the dynastic Steelers and nearly equally successful Pittsburgh Pirates), Red Wings (during the height of the "Dead Wings" era), and Sabres (the only contending team of the three during this time) for home dates also did not lead to attendance bumps. After the season, the Gunds tried to buy the Coliseum, but failed (they later succeeded in buying the Coliseum, and eventually bought the Cavaliers from Ted Stepien in 1983). Also affecting the team – though completely out of their control – was the local economy, as the steel crisis hit the Rust Belt in general and specifically Northeast Ohio hard, especially in nearby Youngstown, who was hit with its now-infamous Black Monday on September 19, 1977, that saw 5,000 steel workers from Youngstown Sheet and Tube laid off almost instantly a whole decade before the WARN Act went into effect, leading to a ripple effect in other Rust Belt cities that would last well into the 1980s.

With the Barons barely registering on Cleveland's sports landscape, the Gunds reluctantly decided to write them off as a lost cause and search for a way out. Years later, Gordon Gund recalled that the decision to disband the team was especially painful given his family's roots in Cleveland. Kenneth Schnitzer, owner of the WHA's Houston Aeros (who were not being included as part of any proposed merger between the two leagues at the time), offered to buy the Barons and relocate them to Houston, but nothing came of it.

Meanwhile, the Minnesota North Stars were also having financial difficulties similar to those faced by the Barons, but unlike the Gunds their owners lacked the resources to absorb the losses. The Gunds began talks with the North Stars and broached the possibility of merging both teams. The league was initially cool to the idea, but ultimately concluded that it would be far better for its image to announce a transaction that could be called a "merger" than risk two teams folding. The league granted final approval for the merger on June 14, 1978. The amalgamated team retained the North Stars' name, colors, and history, with the wealthier Gunds as majority owners. The Barons are the last team to fold in the NHL. (Note: In 2024, the Arizona Coyotes suspended hockey operations that saw the NHL sell their assets to the Utah Hockey Club while the name, history, and other intellectual property were retained by Alex Meruelo with the intent of build a new arena to form a new expansion team. Months later, he forfeited his ownership of said assets, putting the viability of returning hockey to Arizona in doubt for the immediate future.)

In 1979, the NHL finally agreed to absorb the WHA, a development which resulted in a two-decade absence of major league ice hockey in Ohio since the WHA's Cincinnati Stingers were not included in the merger. However, the NHL worked to keep interest in ice hockey alive in the state. The Penguins, who from 1978 to 1991 were owned by Youngstown native Edward J. DeBartolo, Sr., played two designated home games at the Richfield Coliseum in the early 1990s before the arena was demolished and the land added to Cuyahoga Valley National Park. The NHL finally returned to Ohio in 2000 with the expansion Columbus Blue Jackets.

Dennis Maruk was the last Barons player (and last Golden Seals player as well) to be active in the NHL, retiring from the North Stars after the 1988–89 season with 356 goals in 888 games.

With the North Stars continuing to struggle financially, the Gunds began looking to bring NHL ice hockey back to the Bay Area. By the late 1980s, they sought to relocate the North Stars but were blocked by the league. In 1991, the Gunds were granted an expansion franchise in San Jose, which became the San Jose Sharks, in return for selling their stake in the North Stars to a group led by Hartford Whalers' founder Howard Baldwin. As a compromise, the league arranged a special dispersal and expansion draft in which the Sharks claimed 16 North Stars players in a dispersal draft, with both teams then allowed to choose players in an expansion draft.

Although the Sharks are officially a separate franchise from the Seals/Golden Seals/Barons, the arrangement effectively reversed the original Barons–North Stars merger, with the Sharks occupying the same market as the Golden Seals prior to their move to Cleveland. The new North Stars owners ultimately moved their team to Dallas as the Dallas Stars in 1993. The Gunds also later moved an existing AHL team from Lexington, Kentucky, to Cleveland, operating another Cleveland Barons team from 2001 to 2006 as the Sharks' minor league affiliate. The AHL's Cleveland Monsters have been playing in Cleveland since relocating from Salt Lake City, Utah in 2007.

== Season-by-season record ==
Note: GP = Games played, W = Wins, L = Losses, T = Ties, Pts = Points, GF = Goals for, GA = Goals against, PIM = Penalty minutes

Season	Team	GP	W	L	T	Pts	GF	GA	PIM	Finish	Playoffs
Relocated from Oakland, California
1976–77	1976–77	80	25	42	13	63	240	292	1,011	4th in Adams	Did not qualify
1977–78	1977–78	80	22	45	13	57	230	325	1,010	4th in Adams	Did not qualify
Merged with the Minnesota North Stars
Totals		160	47	87	26	120	470	617	2,021		

== Broadcasters ==
In their two years in Cleveland, Larry Hirsch served as the Barons' radio play-by-play announcer on WJW. On the television side, WUAB channel 43 did a very limited schedule with Steve Albert and Dick Hammer on commentary in 1976–77, and perhaps only one game in 1977–78 with Charlie Steiner and Pete Franklin on commentary.

== Notable players ==
=== Team captains ===
- Jim Neilson and Bob Stewart, 1976–1978 (co-captains)

=== First-round draft picks ===
- 1977: Mike Crombeen (fifth overall)

=== NHL All-Star Game selections ===
- Al MacAdam: 1976–77
- Dennis Maruk: 1977–78

=== Head coach ===
- Jack Evans, 1976–1978

=== General managers ===
- Bill McCreary, 1976–1977
- Harry Howell, 1977–1978

== See also ==
- List of Cleveland Barons players
- List of Cleveland Barons draft picks
- List of NHL seasons
