= Bobby Orr =

Canadian ice hockey player (born 1948)

OC Bobby Orr
- Hockey Hall of Fame, 1979
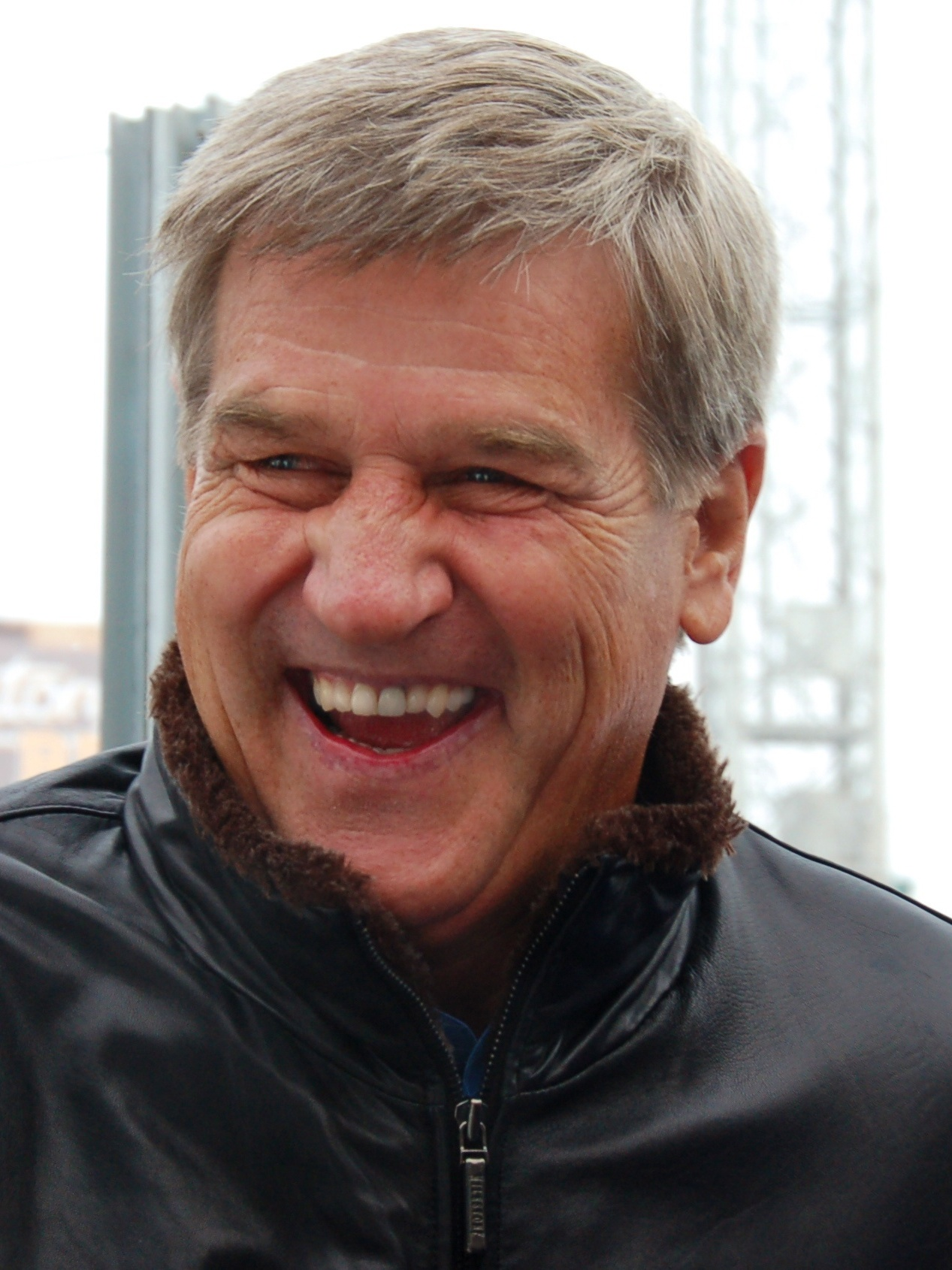
- Orr in 2010
- Born: March 20, 1948 (age 78) Parry Sound, Ontario, Canada
- Height: 6 ft 0 in (183 cm)
- Weight: 197 lb (89 kg; 14 st 1 lb)
- Position: Defence
- Shot: Left
- Played for: Boston Bruins; Chicago Black Hawks
- Playing career: 1966–1978
- Website: www.bobbyorr.com
Medal record
Representing Canada
Men's ice hockey
Canada Cup
Gold medal – first place	1976 Canada	Ice hockey

Robert Gordon Orr (born March 20, 1948) is a Canadian former professional ice hockey player who is widely acknowledged as one of the greatest players of all time. Orr used his skating speed, scoring, and play-making abilities to revolutionize the position of defenceman. He played in the National Hockey League (NHL) for 12 seasons, the first 10 with the Boston Bruins, followed by two with the Chicago Black Hawks. Orr remains the only defenceman to have won the league scoring title with two Art Ross Trophies. He holds the record for most points and assists in a single season by a defenceman. Orr won a record eight consecutive Norris Trophies as the NHL's best defenceman and three consecutive Hart Trophies as the league's most valuable player (MVP). Orr was inducted into the Hockey Hall of Fame in 1979 at age 31, the youngest to be inducted at that time. In 2017, Orr was named by the National Hockey League as one of the "100 Greatest NHL Players" in history.

Orr started in organized hockey at age eight. He first played as a forward, but moved to defence and was encouraged to use his skating skills to control play. Orr's play in Ontario provincial competition attracted the notice of NHL scouts as early as age twelve. At fourteen, Orr joined the Oshawa Generals, the Bruins' junior hockey affiliate, and he was an all-star for three of his four seasons there.

In 1966, Orr joined the Boston Bruins, a team that had not won a Stanley Cup since 1941 and had not made the playoffs since 1959. With Orr, the Bruins won the Stanley Cup twice, in 1970 and 1972. Both times, Orr scored the clinching goal and was named the playoff MVP. In the final achievement of his career, he was the MVP of the 1976 Canada Cup international hockey tournament. In 1976, Orr left Boston as a free agent to join the Black Hawks, but repeated injuries had effectively destroyed his left knee, and he retired in 1978 at age 30.

Orr's first professional contract was one of the first in professional hockey to be negotiated by an agent. It made him the highest-paid player in NHL history as a rookie. His second contract was the first million-dollar contract in the NHL. However, after his retirement, Orr learned he was deeply in debt and he had to sell off most of what he owned. Orr broke with his agent Alan Eagleson and sued the Black Hawks to settle his contract. Orr and his family returned to Boston where Orr went into business to rebuild his finances. Orr aided the investigations that led to Eagleson's fraud convictions and disbarment. Orr also supported a lawsuit that challenged the NHL over its control of its pension plan.

After his hockey career, he became a scout for several professional teams. Orr entered the player agent business in 1996 and was the president of the Orr Hockey Group agency, until its acquisition by the Wasserman Media Group in 2018. Orr is also active in charitable works and in television commercials. Since 1996, Orr has coached a team of junior hockey players in the annual CHL Top Prospects Game.

== Hockey career ==
=== Early life ===
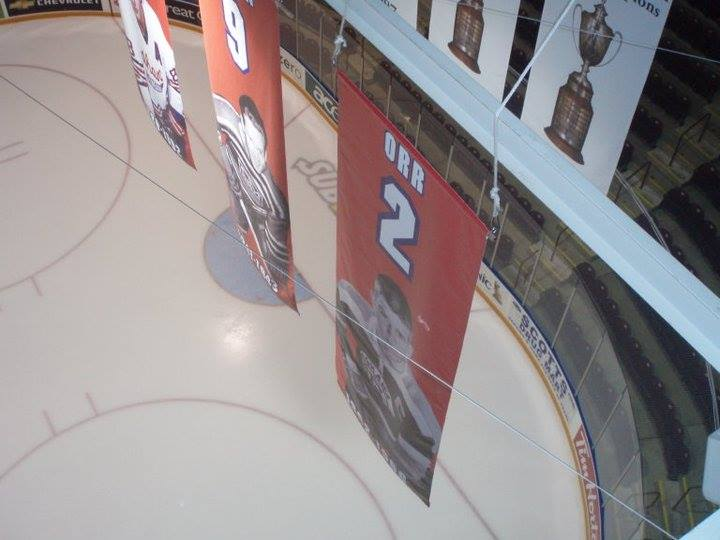
The number 2 worn by Orr was retired by the Oshawa Generals in November 2008

Orr was born in the town of Parry Sound on the shores of Georgian Bay in Ontario, Canada. His grandfather, Robert Orr, was a top-tier soccer pro player who emigrated from Ballymena, Northern Ireland to Parry Sound early in the 20th century. Orr's father, Doug Orr, had once been a hockey prospect and was invited to join the Atlantic City Seagulls in 1942 but turned down the offer. Doug Orr instead joined the Royal Canadian Navy, serving during the Second World War. He returned after the war to Parry Sound and Arva Steele, whom he had married before he left for war, and to a job in the CIL dynamite factory. Doug and Arva had five children together: Patricia, Ronnie, Bobby, Penny, and Doug Jr. Bobby was born on March 20, 1948, at St. Joseph's Hospital, where his grandmother Elsie Orr was a nurse. Bobby was a sick baby at birth and his survival was tenuous.

Orr displayed his hockey talents from an early age. He played his first organized hockey in 1953 at age five, in the "minor squirt" division, a year after getting his first skates and playing shinny. Although he was tiny and somewhat frail, he soon was able to skate faster than anyone his own age, with speed he demonstrated in races around the rink and in games. Until he was ten years old, Orr played on the wing, as a forward. His coach, former NHL player Bucko McDonald, moved Orr to defence. Although Orr played defence, McDonald encouraged Orr to use his talents as a stickhandler, skater, and scorer to make offensive rushes. According to McDonald: "I used to tell Doug the kid was in his natural position when he played defence. You didn't have to be genius to see that – honest. I don't think Doug agreed, but he accepted my decision." Orr would later credit McDonald: "Bucko taught me almost everything I know."

Orr was noticed by the Boston Bruins in the spring of 1961, playing in a youth hockey tournament in Gananoque, Ontario. The Bruins' Wren Blair described him as "a combination of Doug Harvey and Eddie Shore." The Bruins immediately pursued Orr. Blair made regular visits to the family home. In the fall of 1961, the Bruins invested CA$1,000 (CA$10,459 in 2025 dollars) to sponsor his minor hockey team. Although three other NHL teams (Toronto Maple Leafs, Detroit Red Wings, and Montreal Canadiens) were interested in Orr, he signed in 1962 with the Bruins. Orr explained that he signed with the Bruins because "they're a team of the future. They're rebuilding and I want to be part of that building program."

Blair was involved with a plan to start a new Oshawa Generals franchise in a new arena in Oshawa, Ontario. Despite the Bruins already having a junior hockey franchise, the Niagara Falls Flyers, Blair convinced the Bruins to own another. He arranged a deal whereby the Bruins owned 51% of the franchise, but Orr would have to play for Oshawa. When Orr was fourteen, Blair convinced the Orr family to allow Bobby to attend the Flyers' tryout camp. When camp ended and it came time to sign with the Bruins, a meeting with Bruins' owner Weston Adams went sour and Orr headed back to Parry Sound. Blair was able to smooth over the situation and convince Arva that Bobby was old enough to leave home. To get the Orrs' signatures on a "C" Form, committing Bobby to the Bruins at age eighteen, Blair agreed to have Bobby stay in Parry Sound for his schooling, skipping Generals' practices and only driving south to play games on weekends, a three-hour trip one way. The bonus for signing was CA$10,000 (CA$103,270 in 2025 dollars), a new car and the Bruins would pay to stucco the family home.

Orr debuted in junior hockey in the 1962–63 season for the new Generals in the new Metro Junior A League. Orr was only fourteen, competing against eighteen-, nineteen- and twenty-year-olds. The 1963–64 season brought further changes as the Metro League folded and Oshawa joined the Ontario Hockey Association (OHA). Orr moved to Oshawa, where he started attending R. S. McLaughlin high school and boarded with a local family. Orr scored 29 goals to set a junior record for goals by a defenceman and was named to the OHA's first All-Star team.

Orr's goal and point totals increased every year during his junior career, and he was named to the OHA First-All Star team every season he was in the OHA. Orr had his best season in 1965–66, his fourth season of junior. Orr scored 38 goals to increase his goal-scoring record and finished with 94 points to average two points per game for the Generals. The Generals finished fourth in the league, but won the OHA championship, the J. Ross Robertson Cup, by defeating the St. Catharines Black Hawks, Montreal Junior Canadiens, and Kitchener Rangers. The team defeated the Northern Ontario champions North Bay Trappers and the Quebec champions Shawinigan Bruins to win a berth in the Memorial Cup Final for the junior championship of Canada.

Oshawa's hopes in the 1966 Memorial Cup Final were damaged when Orr suffered a groin injury against Shawinigan, a painful injury that weakens a player's skating ability. To promote the event, held in Toronto's Maple Leaf Gardens, the Generals had advertised it would be the last chance to see Orr in junior and were anxious for him to play. Bruins' management demanded Orr not play in the Final, not wanting to risk further damage to their property. Orr and his parents, however, were adamant he be allowed to play for the national championship. As he had not signed to the Bruins, they threatened he would never play for Boston if he was held out. Blair decided to defy the Bruins' ownership and let Orr play. While Orr dressed and played some, he was not a factor and Edmonton defeated Oshawa for the Cup. Oshawa coach Bep Guidolin was fired for letting Orr play, while Blair left the organization of his own accord to join the expansion Minnesota North Stars.

=== Orr and Eagleson ===
By the time Orr turned 16 in 1964, he was still two years away from playing in the NHL and his father Doug was dissatisfied with the Bruins' treatment of the prospect. Doug had asked the Bruins' Blair for more money for Bobby and was turned down. Doug Orr met Toronto lawyer Alan Eagleson at a juvenile fastball tournament dinner in Parry Sound and asked Eagleson to help out with the situation. Eagleson agreed to work with the family for free and continued to do so for the next two years. Bobby and Eagleson developed a relationship Orr would later describe as being like brothers. The two soon became a team, discussing Bobby's future plans without his father Doug.

Eagleson was determined to get Orr a top salary. When Hap Emms, the general manager of the Bruins offered a US$5,000 (US$49,615 in 2025 dollars) signing bonus and US$7,000 and US$8,000 (US$69,462 and US$77,246 in 2025 dollars) for his first two years in the league, Eagleson countered with US$100,000 (US$992,308 in 2025 dollars) for the two years. Orr would refuse to play with the Bruins and played for Canada's national team instead, like Carl Brewer. Orr wanted desperately to play in the NHL, but he went along with Eagleson's strategy and was willing to play for the nationals. The Bruins and Orr agreed on a US$25,000 signing bonus (US$248,077 in 2025 dollars), and a salary "less than $100,000" for the two years, a figure kept secret. Speculation has ranged on an annual salary of US$25,000 to US$40,000 (US$248,077 to US$446,538 in 2025 dollars) at a time when the typical maximum rookie salary was US$9,000. (US$79,385 in 2025 dollars) The official signing ceremony was done on Emms' boat, the Barbara Lynn, where Eagleson and Emms had conferred during negotiations.

At the time, it made Orr the highest-paid player in league history. Beyond that, the signing became one of the most important in the history of professional hockey. Until that time, players had been forced to accept whatever NHL management paid in salaries. It was the start of the player's agent era in professional hockey. For Eagleson, it was the start of his sports business empire. Based on the Orr signing, Eagleson would become the executive director of the new National Hockey League Players' Association (NHLPA) and started on his rise to become one of the most powerful men in the sport and business of ice hockey.

=== Bruins career ===
==== 1966–67 ====
Orr joined the Bruins in the 1966–67 season, his first as a professional. The Bruins were not convinced Orr belonged on defence, trying him out at centre first. Through the pre-season, Orr was given jersey number 27. With Orr's junior number (2) retired in honour of Eddie Shore, the Bruins offered him jersey number 5, that of past Bruins star Dit Clapper, prior to the regular season, but Orr instead chose jersey number 4, which had been vacated by veteran defenceman Albert Langlois. Orr made his NHL regular-season debut on October 19, 1966, against the Detroit Red Wings, getting one assist. On October 22, he scored his first NHL goal against the Montreal Canadiens. It was a slap shot past Gump Worsley and the Boston Garden crowd gave Orr a standing ovation.

In that first season, Orr was challenged by the veterans, and he earned respect by defeating Montreal tough guy Ted Harris in his first NHL fight. On December 4, 1966, Toronto Maple Leafs' defenceman Marcel Pronovost checked him into the boards, injuring Orr's knees for the first time in the NHL. He would miss nine games and the Bruins would lose six of them. The team finished with a 17–43–10 record, leaving the Bruins in last place. However, attendance at Boston Garden increased by forty-one thousand fans.

For the season, Orr scored 13 goals and 28 assists, one of the best rookie seasons in NHL history to that point by a defenceman. Orr won the Calder Memorial Trophy as the league's outstanding rookie and was named to the NHL's Second All-Star team. New York Rangers defenceman Harry Howell won the Norris Trophy as the league's best defenceman that year. In accepting the award, Howell said he was glad to win when he did, predicting "Orr will own this trophy from now on." Orr was runner-up in voting.

==== 1967–68 ====
In 1967–68, his second season, injuries limited Orr to just 46 games in which he scored 11 goals and had 20 assists. Prior to the season, Orr had injured his right knee during a charity game in Winnipeg during the summer requiring five weeks in a cast. In December, a Frank Mahovlich check caused a fracture of Orr's collar bone and a shoulder separation. Orr returned in January in time to play in the NHL All-Star Game, his first of eight appearances overall. Orr had to sit out five games afterwards due to soreness in his left knee. In February, he had to leave a game against Detroit after his left knee went stiff. He would receive the first of his many operations on the knee, repairing ligament and removing cartilage. Orr did return to finish the season, but required an operation during the off-season to remove a bone chip. Despite the injuries, Orr won the first of a record eight consecutive Norris trophies and was named to the NHL's first All-Star team and finished fourth in the voting for the Hart Trophy.

After finishing last in 1966–67, the Bruins qualified for the 1968 playoffs, their first appearance in the playoffs since the 1958–59 season. In the pre-season, the Bruins added Phil Esposito, Fred Stanfield, and Ken Hodge from the Chicago Black Hawks in one of the most famous deals ever. The Bruins also added rookies Glen Sather and Derek Sanderson, developing a more aggressive image that led to the nickname of the 'Big Bad Bruins.' The Bruins, happy to make the playoffs, were swept by eventual champion Montreal in the first round.

==== 1968–69 ====
In 1968–69, Orr skipped the pre-season to rest the knee but was in uniform for the season's start. He required an ice pack on the knee after every game and missed nine games after he caught a skate in a crack in the ice, twisting his knee. He returned to the line-up and finished the season playing through the pain, sometimes struggling to get up to speed and relying on teammates instead of making the plays himself. In other games, Orr was outstanding, scoring his first career NHL hat trick on December 14 against Chicago, adding two assists for a five-point night. He scored 21 goals on the season, breaking the goal-scoring record for a defenceman, and totalled 64 points to set a new point-scoring record for one season for a defenceman. He again won the Norris Trophy while nabbing a First-Team All-Star selection and finishing third in the Hart Trophy balloting.

Orr feuded with Toronto rookie defenceman Pat Quinn that season. In a late-season game, Orr attempted to knock the puck loose from Maple Leafs goaltender Bruce Gamble and Quinn cross-checked Orr to the ice. Orr kicked Quinn and Quinn kicked Orr. On-ice officials broke it up, but the feud continued into the 1969 playoffs. The Bruins finished second in the NHL's East Division and drew the Maple Leafs in the first round. In the first game, in Boston, Quinn caught Orr with his head down during a rush, and caught him with an open-ice hit, knocking Orr unconscious. Quinn, assessed five minutes for elbowing, was attacked in the penalty box by a fan and Quinn swung at the fan with his stick, breaking the glass. When Quinn returned, the Boston fans showered garbage onto the ice. Orr was carried out on a stretcher to the dressing room where he revived after the concussion. According to a Boston police officer at the scene, "The fans here don't like anybody to touch Orr. He's their Frank Merriwell and Jack Armstrong rolled into one. To my thinking, it looked like a clean check." The game degenerated into a brawl after the score reached 10–0 for the Bruins. The Bruins went on to sweep the Maple Leafs before losing in six games to the Montreal Canadiens in the second round. Orr returned for the third game against Toronto, getting two assists as the Bruins won their first games in Toronto since 1965.

==== 1969–70: Overtime winner, first cup ====
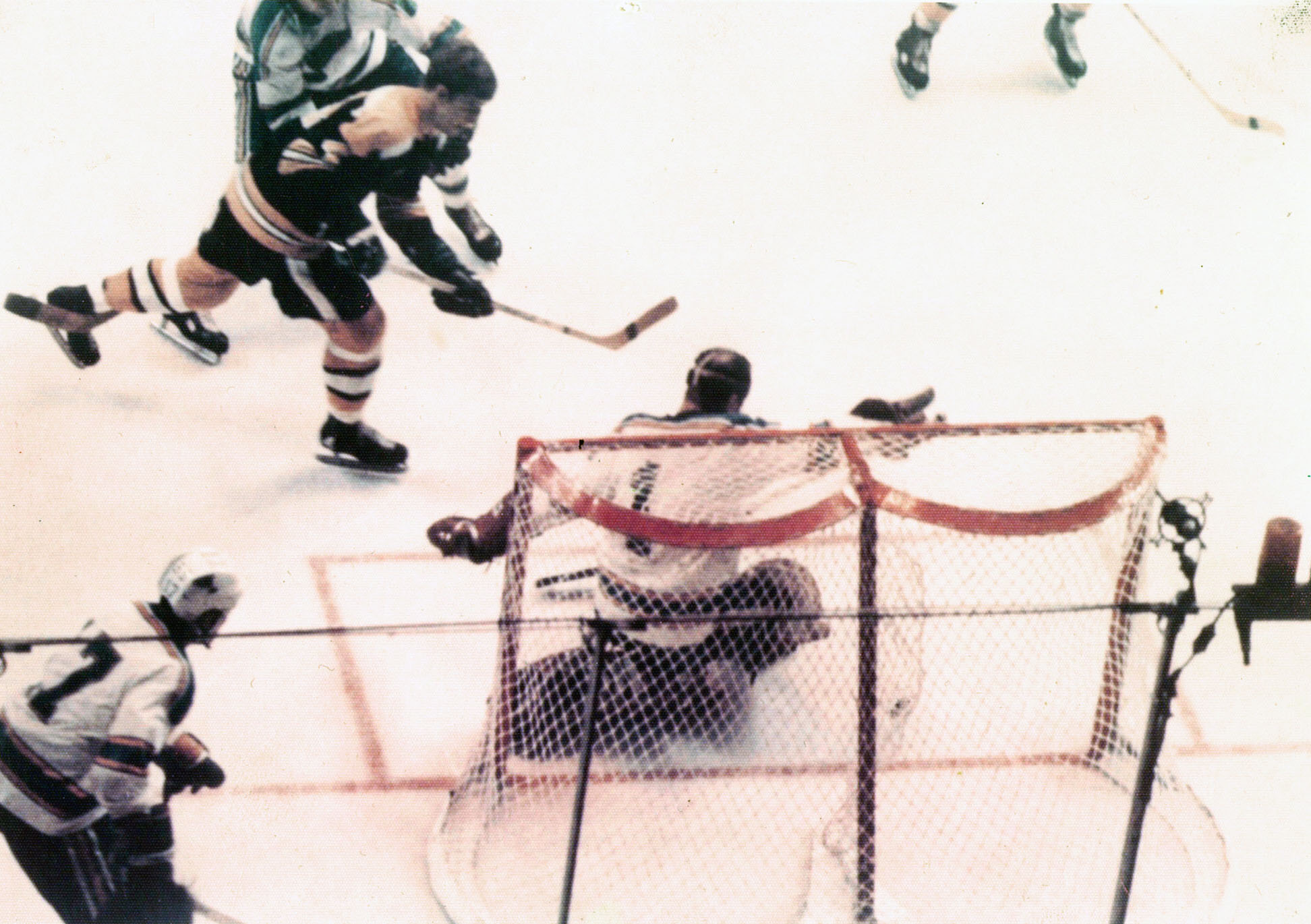
Orr as he scored "The Goal," during the 1970 Stanley Cup Final

In 1969–70, Orr almost doubled his scoring total from the previous season, to 120 points, six shy of the league record (which had been set by his teammate Phil Esposito the previous season), leading the league in scoring, along with becoming the first defenceman in league history to score 100+ points. Orr is still the only defenceman in history to win the Art Ross Trophy as the league's leading scorer, which he also achieved a second time, in 1974–75. In addition to the Norris and the Art Ross, Orr captured the first of three consecutive Hart Trophies as regular-season MVP and later won the Conn Smythe Trophy for his playoff performance, becoming the only player in history to win four major NHL awards in one season.

Orr went on to lead the Bruins in a march through the 1970 playoffs scoring nine goals and 11 assists. The march culminated on May 10, 1970, when he scored one of the most famous goals in hockey history and one that gave Boston its first Stanley Cup since 1941. The goal came off a give-and-go pass with teammate Derek Sanderson at the 40-second mark of the first overtime period in the fourth game, helping to complete a sweep of the St. Louis Blues. Orr recalled his confrontation with Blues goalie Glenn Hall:

If it had gone by me, it's a two-on-one, so I got a little lucky there, but Derek gave me a great pass and when I got the pass I was moving across. As I skated across, Glenn had to move across the crease and had to open his pads a little. I was really trying to get the puck on net, and I did. As I went across, Glenn's legs opened. I looked back, and I saw it go in, so I jumped.

The subsequent photograph by Ray Lussier of a horizontal Orr flying through the air, his arms raised in victory – he had been tripped by Blues' defenceman Noel Picard after scoring the goal – has become one of the most recognizable hockey images of all time. It is highlighted in the opening sequence of the Canadian Broadcasting Corporation's Hockey Night in Canada telecasts.

==== 1970–71 ====
The following season, the powerhouse Bruins shattered dozens of league offensive records. Orr himself finished second in league scoring with 139 points (37 goals and 102 assists), thirteen points behind Esposito, while setting records that still stand for points in a season by a defenceman and for plus-minus (+124) by any position player. He also became the first player in league history to have consecutive 100+ point seasons. Orr's 102 assists set a league record that would not be broken until Wayne Gretzky totalled 109 in 1980–81. He also set the record for longest point streak by a defenceman scoring at least a point in 18 straight games, which lasted from December 13, 1970, until January 24, 1971. This record would last till 1986 when it was broken by Paul Coffey. Orr's Bruins were heavy favourites to repeat as Cup champions, but were upset by the Montreal Canadiens and their rookie goaltender Ken Dryden, at one time Bruins' property, in the first round of the 1971 playoffs. At the end of the year Orr was awarded the Charlie Conacher Humanitarian Award for his humanitarian contributions throughout his career.

For the season, the Bruins gave Orr a solid gold puck, one of four they gave out to Bruins players – to each of the four Bruins who scored over 100 points that season – Esposito, Orr, Johnny Bucyk, and Ken Hodge. The group finished 1–2–3–4 in league scoring, the first time in NHL history the season's top four scorers all played for one team. Orr later gave his puck to Alan Eagleson. In 2007, Eagleson sold the puck in an auction of memorabilia for CA$16,500.

==== 1971–72: Second and final cup ====
Orr signed a new five-year contract on August 26, 1971, for US$200,000 (US$1,589,975 in 2025 dollars) per season – the NHL's first million dollar contract. In the following 1971–72 season, Orr was again second in the scoring race to Esposito, this time with 117 points, as his goal total matched his previous years total of 37, but his assists dropped to 80. He again won the Hart and Norris trophies, helping the Bruins to a first-place finish in the East. In the 1972 playoffs, Orr again led the Bruins to the Stanley Cup, leading the scoring in the playoffs (24 points with 19 assists) and scoring the championship-winning goal against New York. For his performance in the playoffs, he received his second Conn Smythe Trophy as playoff MVP, making him the award's first two-time winner. Rangers forward Vic Hadfield commented "We played them pretty even, but they had Bobby Orr and we didn't." By this time, Orr knew his left knee was deteriorating and he would not have many seasons left. Orr also won the MVP award at the 1972 NHL All-Star Game to win four MVP awards in one season. Since then only Nicklas Lidström (2002) and Cale Makar (2022) have won the Norris and Conn Smythe trophies in the same season.

==== 1972–73 ====
The 1972–73 saw upheaval at the Bruins. Former head coach Sinden returned to the club as the general manager. Bruins players Gerry Cheevers, Derek Sanderson, and Johnny McKenzie joined the upstart World Hockey Association. Coach Tom Johnson was fired fifty-two games into the season, replaced by Bep Guidolin, who had once coached Orr. The Adams family, which had owned the team since its founding in the 1920s, sold it to Storer Broadcasting. The Bruins' season came to a premature end in a first-round loss in the 1973 playoffs, losing Esposito to injury in that first round. Orr amassed 101 points during the regular season (he only played 63 games due to injury,) but had only two points in the playoff loss.

==== 1973–74 ====
In 1973–74, Orr led the Bruins to another first-place finish in the regular season. His point total rebounded to 122 with 32 goals and 90 assists. That season, Orr set the record (since surpassed) for the most points in a game by a defenceman, scoring 3 goals and 4 assists in a November 15, 1973 game against the New York Rangers. One goal, a shot from the blue line, broke Rangers' defenceman Rod Seiling's stick. That year he joined his teammates Esposito (145), Hodge (105) and Cashman (89) where they once again finished 1–2–3–4 in league scoring marking the second and last time in NHL history the season's top four scorers all played for one team.

The Bruins made it to the 1974 Stanley Cup Final, but lost this time to the Philadelphia Flyers in six games. In game one, late in the third period tied at 2–2, Orr blocked the open Boston net with his leg to keep out a Flyers' shot on goal, then took the puck up the ice and scored on a slapshot past goaltender Bernie Parent with a little over a minute remaining in regulation time to propel the Bruins to a 3–2 win. In game five, Orr assisted on Boston's first goal with shorthanded rush, and scored the next two goals himself as the Bruins won 5–1. In the deciding game six, Orr was in the penalty box after a scuffle with the Flyers' Bobby Clarke and during the ensuing power play the Flyers scored (which turned out to be the Cup-winning goal), but with four seconds left and the Bruins trailing 1-0 Orr took a face-off and sent a desperation length of the ice shot that went just wide of the Flyers' net (goaltender Parent admitted "If his shot is on net, it's a goal").

==== 1974–75 ====
In the 1974–75 season, Orr broke his own previous record for goals by a defenceman, scoring 46 goals to go with 89 assists for his sixth straight 100-point season. His record for goals by a defenceman stood until Paul Coffey totalled 48 in 1985–86. He won the league scoring title and the Art Ross Trophy for the second time. 1974–75 was his last full season and his last season playing with Esposito. The Bruins placed second in the Adams Division, and lost to the Chicago Black Hawks in the first round of the 1975 playoffs, losing the best-of-three series, two games to one. With this season, he had tallied 100 points in six straight seasons, a record for any player of any position, forward, or defencemen (since broken), although his teammate Esposito that season also achieved his sixth (and last) 100-point season, although only five of those were consecutive. In fact, there are only nine other seasons in history of defencemen scoring 100 points or more (Paul Coffey with five, Denis Potvin, Al MacInnis, Brian Leetch, and Erik Karlsson with one each).

==== 1975–76 ====
The 1975–76 season was Orr's final season with the Bruins and it was tumultuous. Orr's contract was ending after the season, potentially making him a free agent. The Bruins were sold by Storer Broadcasting in August 1975 and the new Jacobs ownership group had to promise to keep Orr as a condition of the purchase. The Bruins and Orr reached a verbal agreement with the Jacobs during the summer of 1975, including a controversial agreement for Orr to take an 18.5% share of the Bruins after his playing days were over. The agreement was to be checked out as to whether it would be legal for tax reasons and whether or not the league would approve it.

Before the season started, however, Orr underwent another surgical procedure on September 20, 1975. The Bruins' contract talks with Orr and Eagleson became difficult. The Bruins' insurer would not insure a contract with Orr and doctors advised the Bruins that Orr would not be able to play much longer. Orr returned to the line-up on November 8, 1975, the day after the Bruins traded Esposito to the New York Rangers. Orr was able to play the next ten games for the team but had to stop on November 28 due to pain in his knee. The next day, he underwent another surgical procedure on his knee. Originally expected to only be out for seven to eight weeks, his knee did not respond to therapy and he returned home to Parry Sound. His season was over after ten games and he would not play again for the Bruins. His impending free agency led to speculation that the Bruins would trade him, but despite his injury, they were negotiating to keep him until the end.

During his Bruins career, Orr was often the player the press wanted for a post-game interview. Orr instead would hide in the trainer's room. Teammate Terry O'Reilly described him as a "very private, very shy guy, who just happened to be the best hockey player in the world." According to the Bruins public relations director Nate Greenberg "one of my toughest jobs in the day was trying to get Orr to come out of the trainer's room to talk to the press. The reason he wouldn't or didn't all the time was that he really wanted his teammates to get proper accolades, while everybody, all the time wanted him." Orr did not authorize a biography of himself until 2013, preferring not to be the centre of attention.

=== Free agency and the move to Chicago ===
In September 1975, the Bruins and Eagleson had reached a deal that would pay Orr US$4 million (US$23,933,210 in 2025 dollars) for ten years, but when Orr's knee required surgery, the Bruins reduced its offer to US$295,000 (US$1,669,079 in 2025 dollars) per season and a payment of US$925,000 (US$3,614,449 in 2025 dollars) or 18.6% of the Bruins in June 1980. Eagleson turned down the offer and on June 7, 1976, was quoted in the Toronto Star as saying "Boston offered a five-year deal at US$925,000 or 18.6 per cent ownership of the club in 1980. I didn't think it would be wise for him to be a player-owner." On June 9, 1976, after Orr had signed with Chicago, Eagleson told The Globe and Mail that the Bruin offer was "a five-year offer for US$295,000 a year. In addition, Orr was to receive US$925,000 in cash payable in June 1980. That was to be a cash payment or involve Orr's receiving 18.6 per cent of the Bruins stock." According to a famous 1990 story in the Toronto Star by Ellie Tesher, Orr stated that Eagleson never told him of the offer, during negotiations or after. While Eagleson had spoken publicly to reporters of the offer, he had not discussed it with Orr.

In 1976, the Bruins offered Orr US$600,000 (US$3,394,737 in 2025 dollars) per season, but he would have to pass a physical examination at the start of each season's training camp. Only the first year's money was guaranteed. Eagleson was quoted at the time as saying, "There is only one way that Bobby Orr will ever be back with the Bruins, and that's if Jeremy Jacobs asks him for another meeting and straightens out the whole situation. Otherwise he's gone." Instead, Orr became a free agent, with Boston to receive compensation. Orr and Eagleson whittled down a list of potential teams to St. Louis and Chicago. Chicago offered a five-year guaranteed contract with the Black Hawks, and on June 8, 1976, he officially signed with the Black Hawks. The Bruins' general manager, Harry Sinden complained of tampering by the Black Hawks, and demanded that Chicago owner Bill Wirtz submit to a lie detector test. According to documents held by Orr, they had a valid case. Orr signed with the Black Hawks at a secret meeting in May 1976, prior to becoming a free agent.

Then-Bruins head coach Don Cherry suggested that the reason Orr never re-signed with the Bruins was Orr's complete trust in Eagleson at the time (Orr said that he described Eagleson as a brother). Cherry recalled Orr had refused to speak with the Bruins team president directly, allowing Eagleson to mislead or withhold enough details from Boston's offer. Orr's departure from the Bruins was acrimonious and he has not held an official role with the Bruins since. Years later, it emerged that Eagleson had very good relations with Black Hawks owner Bill Wirtz and NHL president John Ziegler that colluded to hold back salaries of certain players. Orr disassociated himself from Eagleson in 1980.

Orr's contract with Chicago, five years in length, was for US$3 million (US$16,973,684 in 2025 dollars), to be paid over 30 years. Spreading out the payments in this way was done to minimize taxes. While a player, he never cashed a Chicago paycheque, stating that he was paid to play hockey and would not accept a salary if he was not playing.

On October 24, 1976, during a game vs. St Louis Orr scored two goals one of them being his 900 career point making him the first NHL defenceman to reach the milestone.

=== 1976 Canada Cup ===
After Orr signed with Chicago, the Black Hawks gave him permission to play for Team Canada in the 1976 Canada Cup tournament. Orr did not play in the 1972 Summit Series against the Soviet Union, and he wanted badly to play for Canada. Orr had been unable to play in the Summit Series due to knee surgery, although he did participate as a non-player. Orr's participation in the Canada Cup was considered ill-conceived and Eagleson later thought it may have been the 'last straw' that killed his career. Orr himself said that he knew before the tournament that "I knew I didn't have much longer. That series didn't do it. I thought I could get the next season in, but not much after that. I knew, looking at that team, I wouldn't have to do as much. I wouldn't have traded it for anything."

Despite his knee, Orr's performance in the Canada Cup led to him being named to the tournament All-Star team and he was named the overall MVP for the tournament. According to teammate Bobby Clarke, Orr "would hardly be able to walk on the morning of the game, and he would hardly be able to walk in the afternoon, and then, at night, he would be the best player on one of the greatest teams ever assembled. He was the best player in every game; he was the best player in the tournament. He couldn't skate like he used to, but he could still go." According to teammate Darryl Sittler, "Bobby Orr was better on one leg, than anybody else was on two."

=== Retirement ===
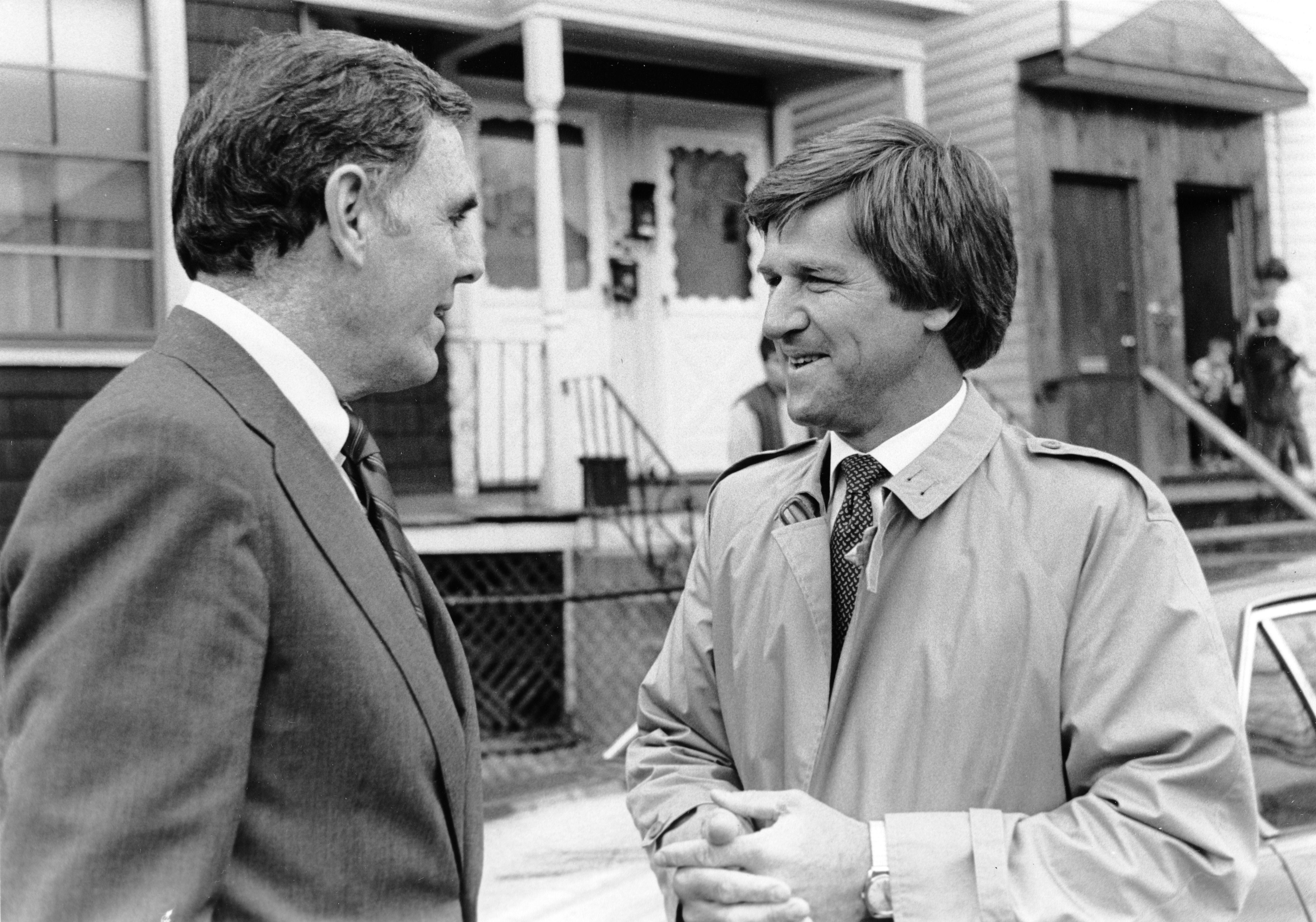
Orr (right) with Boston Mayor Raymond Flynn circa 1984–1987

Orr signed with Chicago, but his injuries limited him to only 26 games over the next three seasons. He sat out the entire 1977–78 season. By 1978, Orr had undergone over a dozen knee surgical procedures, was having trouble walking and barely skated any more. However, in the summer of 1978, he decided to make a comeback. He played six games of the 1978–79 season and came to the conclusion that he could no longer play and informed the Black Hawks that he was retiring. He started a new role as an assistant to Chicago general manager Bob Pulford. He scored his last NHL goal and point against Detroit on October 28, 1978, at Detroit's Olympia Stadium.

Orr retired having scored 270 goals and 645 assists for 915 points in 657 games, adding 953 penalty minutes. At the time of his retirement, he was the leading defenceman in league history in goals, assists and points, tenth overall in assists and 19th in points. As of 2018, the only retired players in league history to have averaged more points per game than Orr are Wayne Gretzky, Mario Lemieux, and Mike Bossy, all of them forwards. "Losing Bobby", said Gordie Howe, "was the greatest blow the National Hockey League has ever suffered".

The Hockey Hall of Fame waived the normal three-year waiting period for induction into the Hall and he was enshrined at age 31 – the youngest player living at the time of his induction in history. Orr was the eighth player to have the three-year period waived, the next two being Mario Lemieux (1997) and Wayne Gretzky (1999), after which the Hall decided that the waiting period would no longer be waived for any player except under "certain humanitarian circumstances".

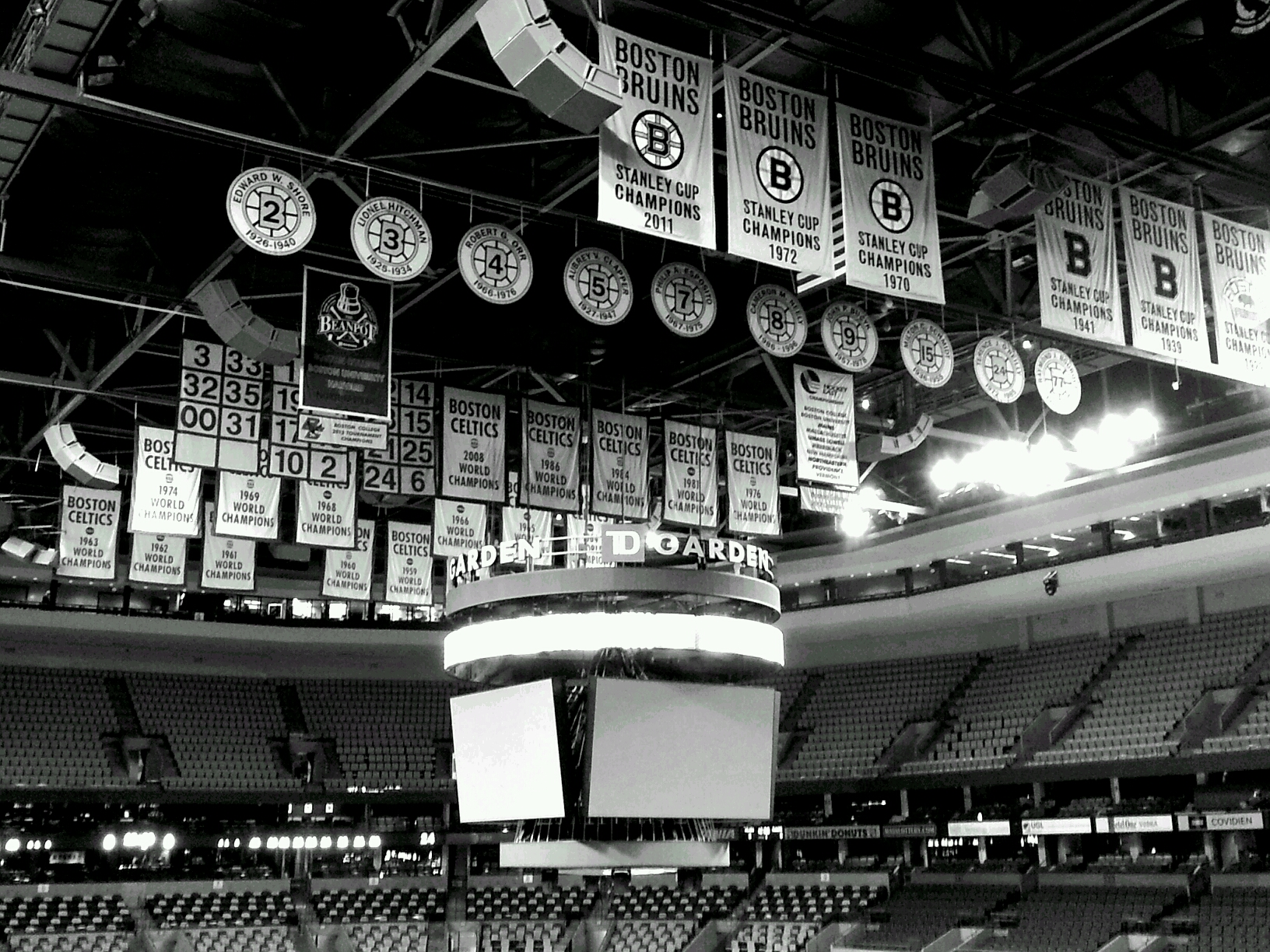
Player numbers retired by the Bruins hoisted at the TD Garden rafters. Orr's number was retired with the club in 1979.

His number 4 jersey was retired by the Bruins on January 9, 1979. At the ceremony, the crowd at Boston Garden would not stop applauding and as a result, most of the evening's program had to be scrapped at the last second due to the constant cheering. The crowd did not allow Orr to say his thank you speech until he put on a Bruins jersey. The day was proclaimed "Bobby Orr Day" in Boston and the event raised thousands of dollars for charity. He attended the Massachusetts Senate and House of Representatives and was given a five-minute standing ovation. Boston Celtics basketball superstar Larry Bird said in his pre-game inspiration that he always looked up at the rafters of the Garden at Orr's retired No. 4, instead of the retired numbers of Celtics stars such as Bill Russell, Bob Cousy, or John Havlicek.

== Style of play ==
When Orr and the Bruins visited cities, attendance was usually a sell-out. According to longtime Bruins coach and general manager Harry Sinden, "Bobby became a star in the NHL about the time they played the National Anthem for his first game with us". Columnist Dan Shaughnessy of The Boston Globe wrote that during the "Orr years. Those Bruins were the top draw in our town every day for five seasons. They were bigger than the Red Sox or Celtics".

Orr inspired the game of hockey with his command of the two-way game. Orr's offensive style has influenced countless defencemen who followed him. His teammate Eddie Johnston once stated "They say Bobby doesn’t play defense. Heck, he makes hockey a 40-minute game for us. He’s got the puck 20 minutes by himself. What better defense is there? If Orr has the puck, we’re going to score—not the other guys."

In contrast to the style of hanging-back defensive play common in the later 1950s and 1960s, Orr was known for his fluid skating and end-to-end rushing. Orr's rushing enabled him to be where the puck was, allowing him not only to score effectively but also to defend when necessary. According to the Bruins' Phil Esposito, "No matter how fast an opponent was, Bobby could skate faster than him if he needed to do it in the framework of a play. If he was caught up-ice and the other team had an odd-man rush, that's when you saw his truly great speed. Very seldom did he not get back to have a hand in breaking up the play." Orr also benefited from playing most of his career in Boston Garden, which was 9 feet (2.7 m) shorter than the standard NHL rink. This suited his rushing style very well, as he was able to get from one end of the ice to the other faster than in a standard rink.

Orr's style of play was hard on his left knee, leading to injuries and surgeries that shortened his career. The left knee took all of the punishment and was operated on "13 or 14" times according to Orr. Orr was a left-hand shot who played the right side. He would race down the right wing with the puck and attempt to beat the opposing defenceman using his speed and strength. He 'protected the puck', leading with his left knee, and holding his left arm up to fend off opponents. This put him into a position where a hit by the opposing defencemen would often hit the left knee. Also, he would often end up crashing into either the opposing goalie, the net or the end boards. "It was the way I played," Orr has said. "I liked to carry the puck and if you do that, you're going to get hit. I wish I'd played longer, but I don't regret it." Orr stated in 2008. "I had a style—when you play, you play all-out. I tried to do things. I didn't want to sit back. I wanted to be involved."

His right knee was basically undamaged during his career; his left knee looks like "a road map of downtown Boston" according to sportswriter Bob McKenzie. His left knee was used in a MasterCard commercial in 2008, his scar lines used in an animation connecting his many achievements to the year of the individual scar line. According to a 2009 Sports Illustrated article Orr has since had two knee replacement surgeries that have left him pain-free.

Orr also had a deadly accurate shot, as Philadelphia Flyers goaltender Bernie Parent admitted "If his shot is on net, it's a goal". Orr used little to no tape on his stick. In his autobiography, Orr: My Story, he said "In my case, I liked the feel of the puck on the blade without any tape at all... So the idea came to me that if I had to have tape on my stick, I would use as little as possible. Over the years, I used less and less until I was down to a single stripe. And eventually I ended up with no tape at all."

Former Montreal Canadiens goaltender Ken Dryden described Orr as follows: "When he began to move ... the sensation was unique: All the Canadiens began backpedalling in a small panic, like beachgoers sighting a coming monster wave. He brought others with him; he wanted them involved. That's what made him so different: It felt like a five-player stampede moving toward you—and at his pace. He pushed his teammates, [because] you're playing with the best player in the league and he's giving you the puck and you just can't mess it up. You had to be better than you'd ever been."

Philadelphia Flyers' head coach Fred Shero commented after the 1974 Stanley Cup Final: "They had Orr and he can do an awful lot. But we've got 17 good hockey players and every one of them put out. It was 17 against one." As the other Bruins players frequently passed the puck to Orr, and since Orr's skating ability made it hard for an assigned checker to follow, Shero countered by having "all of his [Flyers] forward lines swirl around in front of the net, usually in a crossing pattern, to serve as mobile roadblocks in Orr's path". In 1974, Orr released the book My Game, cowritten with Mark Mulvoy from Sports Illustrated.

Orr was also known for his mean streak. Former coach Don Cherry recounts an incident one night in Los Angeles during a game that the Bruins were losing. With a minute to go, Orr pulled one of the Bruins off the ice, left the bench and attacked a Los Angeles Kings player. Asked why, Orr said to Cherry, "He was laughing at us." According to Cherry, he fought a lot. On another occasion in November 1967, Orr was clipped in the face by Toronto Maple Leaf Brian Conacher's stick. Boston teammate Johnny McKenzie flattened Conacher from behind and started punching him. Orr, cut and bleeding, got up from the ice, pulled MacKenzie off Conacher and started punching him. Conacher, who was not fighting back, was also sucker-punched by the Bruins' Ken Hodge. Orr would be booed in Toronto from that date onwards. Orr was frequently compared to Brad Park, who played a similar style to Orr and later succeeded Orr as Boston's top defenceman, and the two often fought each other on-ice, fuelling the bitter rivalry between the Bruins and New York Rangers. Park said, "I saw no reason to be upset because I was rated second to Bobby Orr. After all, Orr not only was the top defenceman in the game, but he was considered the best player ever to put on a pair of skates. There was nothing insulting about being rated number two to such a super superstar".

== Post-hockey career ==
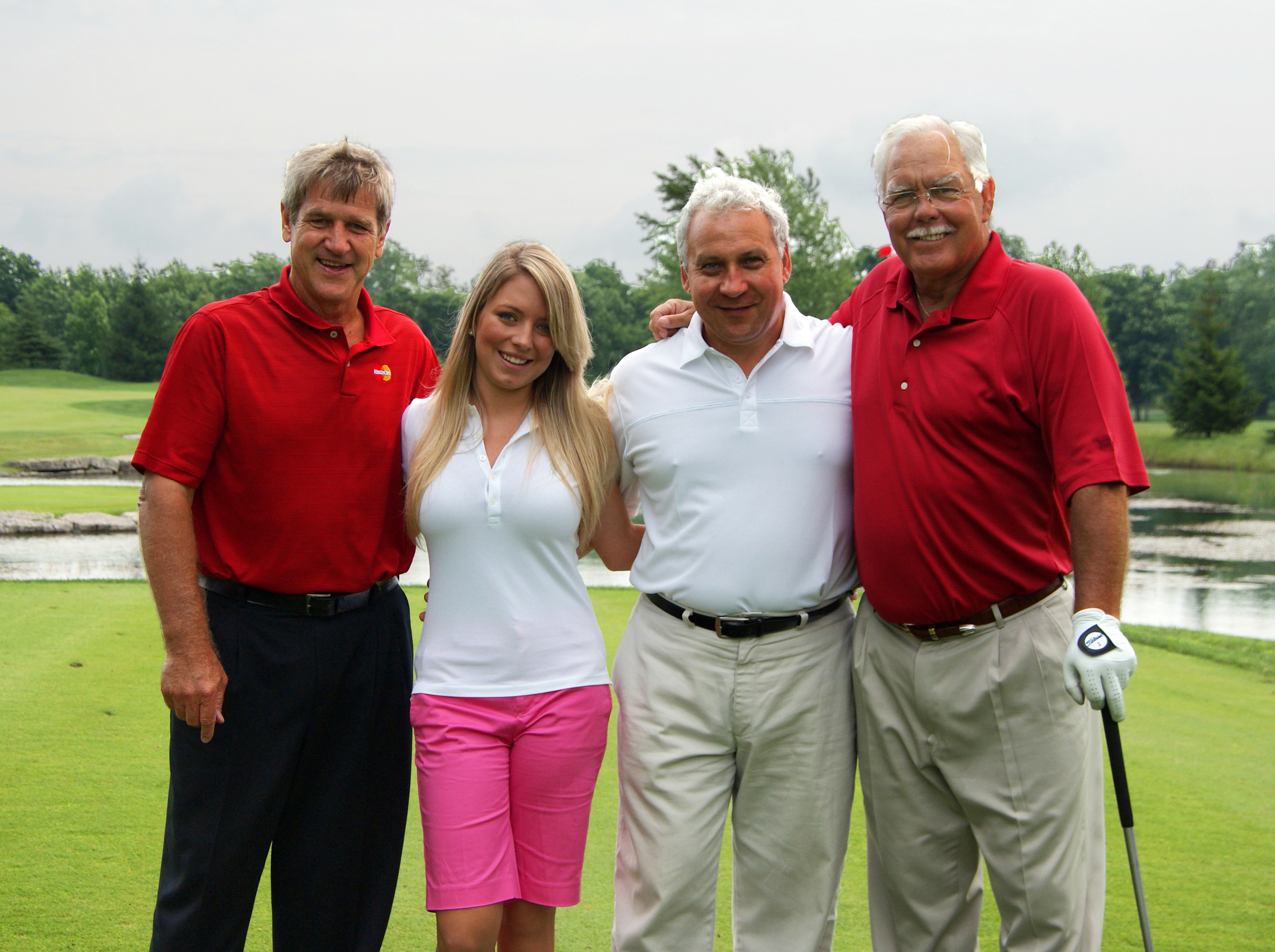
Orr on a golf course in 2010 with his former teammate Derek Sanderson who is on the far right

Shortly after Orr retired, an independent accountant revealed that Orr's liabilities exceeded his assets, leaving him essentially bankrupt despite being supposedly one of the highest-paid players in the NHL. As well, Orr's taxes were under review. Eagleson had set up a corporation to receive Orr's income and pay Orr a salary, but the arrangement was rejected by US and Canadian tax authorities. His assets in July 1980 totalled US$456,604 (US$2,025,513 in 2025 dollars) and his tax, legal and accounting bills totalled US$469,546 (US$2,082,924 in 2025 dollars). Eagleson, who had once said Orr was 'fixed for life', criticized Orr for 'living beyond his means' and ignoring his investment advice. Orr split with Eagleson on April 1, 1980. As part of the legal settlement with Orr, Eagleson agreed to purchase various assets of Orr's for US$620,000 (US$2,422,658 in 2025 dollars), including his Orr–Walton Hockey Camp, which paid off US$450,000 (US$1,758,380 in 2025 dollars) of Orr's bank loans.

Orr served briefly as an assistant coach for Chicago, and as a consultant to the NHL and Hartford Whalers. The Black Hawks balked at paying him the balance of his contract, and Orr took them to court, settling in 1983 for US$450,000 (US$1,454,644 in 2025 dollars), one-third of the money they owed him. Of this, US$200,000 (US$646,509 in 2025 dollars) went to taxes and legal fees. Orr moved back to the Boston area and formed Can-Am Enterprises with partners Tom Kelly and Paul Shanley, which built up a clientele of endorsements for Orr, including Baybank and Standard Brands. Orr did eventually restore his finances, thanks to endorsement contracts and public relations work.

Orr later played a role in the exposure of Eagleson's misconduct over the years. He had once considered Eagleson a "big brother", but broke with him in 1980 in part because he suspected that Eagleson had not been truthful with him. In addition to misleading his clients about contract terms, Eagleson fraudulently used NHLPA funds to enrich himself. Orr was one of several players who filed a formal complaint of legal misconduct against Eagleson with the Law Society of Upper Canada over Eagleson's lending of trust monies without the consent or knowledge of his clients. In 1998, Eagleson was convicted of fraud, embezzlement and racketeering. After the conviction, Orr was one of eighteen former players who threatened to resign from the Hockey Hall of Fame if Eagleson was not removed as a builder. Facing almost certain removal, Eagleson resigned instead.

Orr was also involved in the 1991 lawsuit of retired NHL players against the NHL over its control of the players' pension fund. Eagleson was involved there too, arranging for the players to give up a seat on the trusteeship of the pension fund in 1969 to gain the acceptance of the NHLPA with the NHL owners. Orr and ex-Bruin Dave Forbes discussed the lawsuit with the sports newspaper The National. Orr: "Our money is being used to pay pensions for current players". The NHL's response was to file a notice of libel and slander against Orr and Forbes. Carl Brewer defended Orr in a letter to then-NHL president John Ziegler: "It is regrettable that the NHL and the member clubs would resort to such treatment of one of our game's icons, Bobby Orr. And isn't it interesting that baseball players who started their pension plan in 1947, as did the NHL, have assets in their plan of some US$500 million while we, as far as we can understand, have US$31.9 million." The pension lawsuit was finally won by the players in 1994 after two courts ruled against the NHL. The NHL had appealed the case to the Supreme Court of Canada which decided not to hear the case.

In 1980, Orr's former teammate from his days with the Ottawa Generals Bill Heindl Jr. attempted suicide by jumping off a bridge in Winnipeg. Heindl survived, but was left a paraplegic. Orr organized a charity game in Winnipeg to raise money for Heindl. The game, played April 25, 1980, was played between former professional players and former members of the Canadian National Team and was attended by over 15,000 people at the Winnipeg Arena. Over $85,000 was raised for Heindl's recovery. Among the players to join Orr was Wayne Gretzky, and the event marked the only time the two NHL superstars played in the same game. In 1988, Orr made a cameo appearance in a season 3 episode of the American crime drama Spenser: For Hire.

Orr became an agent representing hockey players in 1996. Along with investors, Orr purchased the Woolf Associates agency founded by Boston lawyer Bob Woolf. To prevent conflicts of interest, Orr sold an investment in the Lowell Lock Monsters minor pro hockey team and cut his ties with a credit card firm that had a contract with the NHLPA. Orr became a certified agent, although he would not be negotiating with hockey clubs. Player agent Rick Curran merged his agency with Orr's in 2000. Curran and Orr along with partner Paul Krepelka incorporated the agency as Orr Hockey Group in February 2002. In 2000, Orr played one of the referees in the film A Shot at Glory.

The group represents such NHL players as Jeff Carter, Steve Downie, Taylor Hall, Nathan Horton, Connor McDavid, Adam McQuaid, Colton Orr (no relation), Patrick Sharp, Jason Spezza, Eric Staal, Jordan Staal, Marc Staal, and Cam Ward. Spezza, asked to comment on the experience of having Orr as an agent, replied: "I don't think I have a true feeling for how great he is. I have so much respect for him. I watch him on tapes and it's just ridiculous how good he was compared to the guys he was playing against. He's a great guy and you don't even know it's Bobby Orr, the way he talks to you."

For a number of years, Orr has coached a team of top Canadian Hockey League junior players against a similar team coached by Don Cherry in the annual CHL Top Prospects Game. Cherry, briefly his former coach in Boston, considers Orr the greatest hockey player who ever lived, noting that Orr was a complete all-around player who could skate, score, fight, and defend. As of 2010, Orr's teams have won most of the games, winning seven of the eleven times Orr has coached against Cherry. Orr's participation was criticized as a conflict of interest while he was a player's agent and he stopped coaching in the series. Organizers of the series convinced Orr to return to coaching in the series. He stepped down again before the 2011 game for the birth of his second grandchild. One of the teams remained named 'Team Orr.'

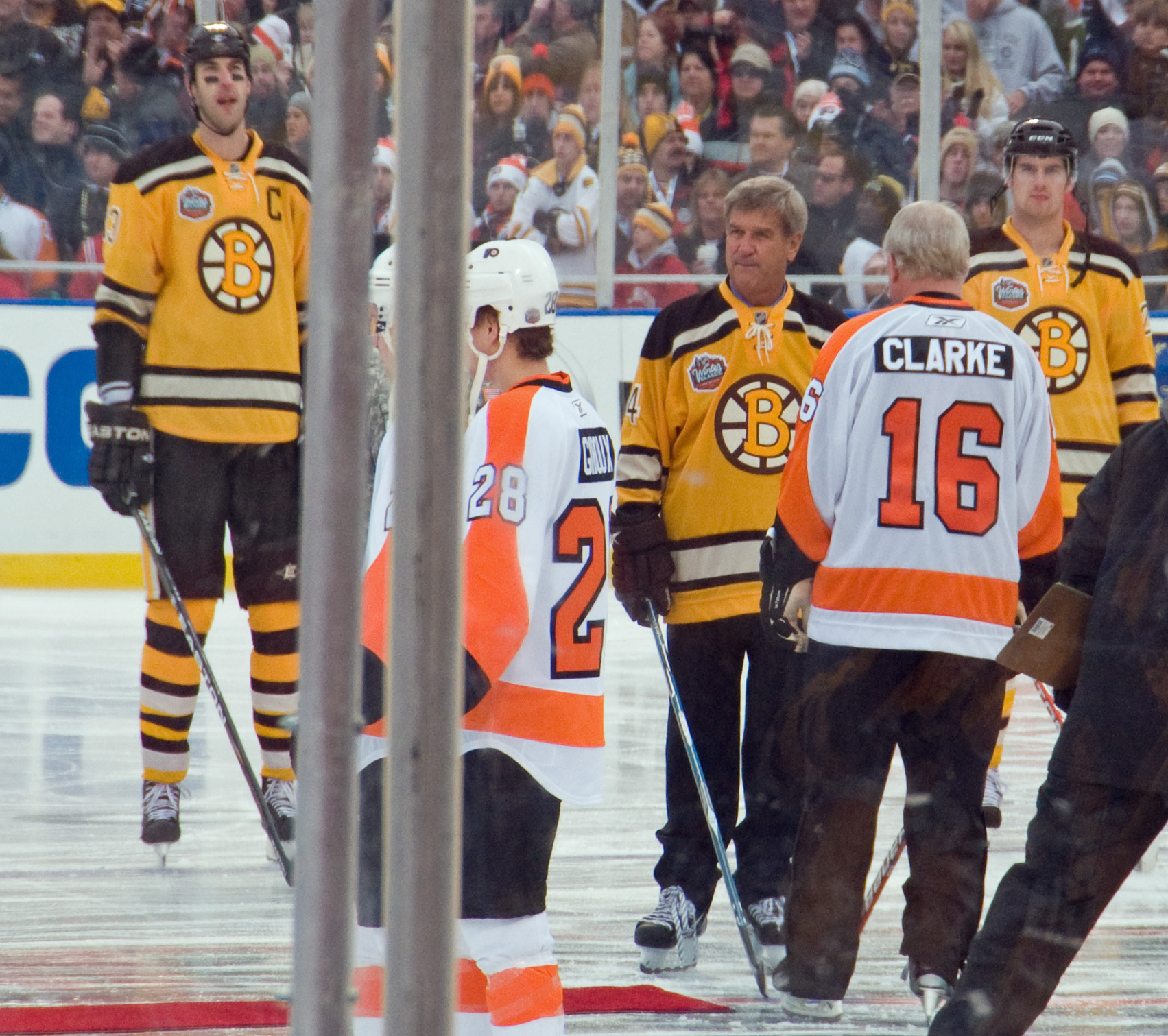
Orr prepares for the ceremonial puck drop with Bobby Clarke prior to the 2010 NHL Winter Classic

Since retiring, Orr has performed a number of ceremonial first puck drops with the Bruins, including at the 2010 NHL Winter Classic with Bobby Clarke, between the Bruins and the Flyers. Orr performed another ceremonial puck drop on October 20, 2016, Orr along with Milt Schmidt dropped the ceremonial puck at the Boston Bruins' first home game of the season. Most recently Orr alongside former teammate Johnny Bucyk, performed the ceremonial puck drop at the 2023 Winter Classic.

Orr has also served as the honorary banner captain for the Bruins on multiple occasions the first came on June 8, 2011, during game four of the 2011 Stanley Cup Final. Orr also served as the banner captain twice during the Bruins 2019 playoff run, one of the games he shared the duties with former teammate Derek Sanderson.

On November 3, 2013, Orr's long-awaited autobiography titled Orr: My Story, debuted at the #8 position on The New York Times best seller list for nonfiction.

== Personal life ==
While on vacation, Orr met Margaret Louise "Peggy" Wood, a Trenton, Michigan native and speech therapist who worked in Fort Lauderdale, Florida. They became engaged on Christmas Day, 1972, and married in September 1973 at a 'secret' ceremony in Parry Sound. They have two sons, Darren and Brent. Darren works as a player's agent at Orr Hockey Group. Orr's mother Arva died in November 2000, 18 months after being diagnosed with cancer. Orr's father Doug died in 2007. Orr became a grandfather when granddaughter Alexis was born in 2009. A second grandchild, Robert, was born in January 2011.

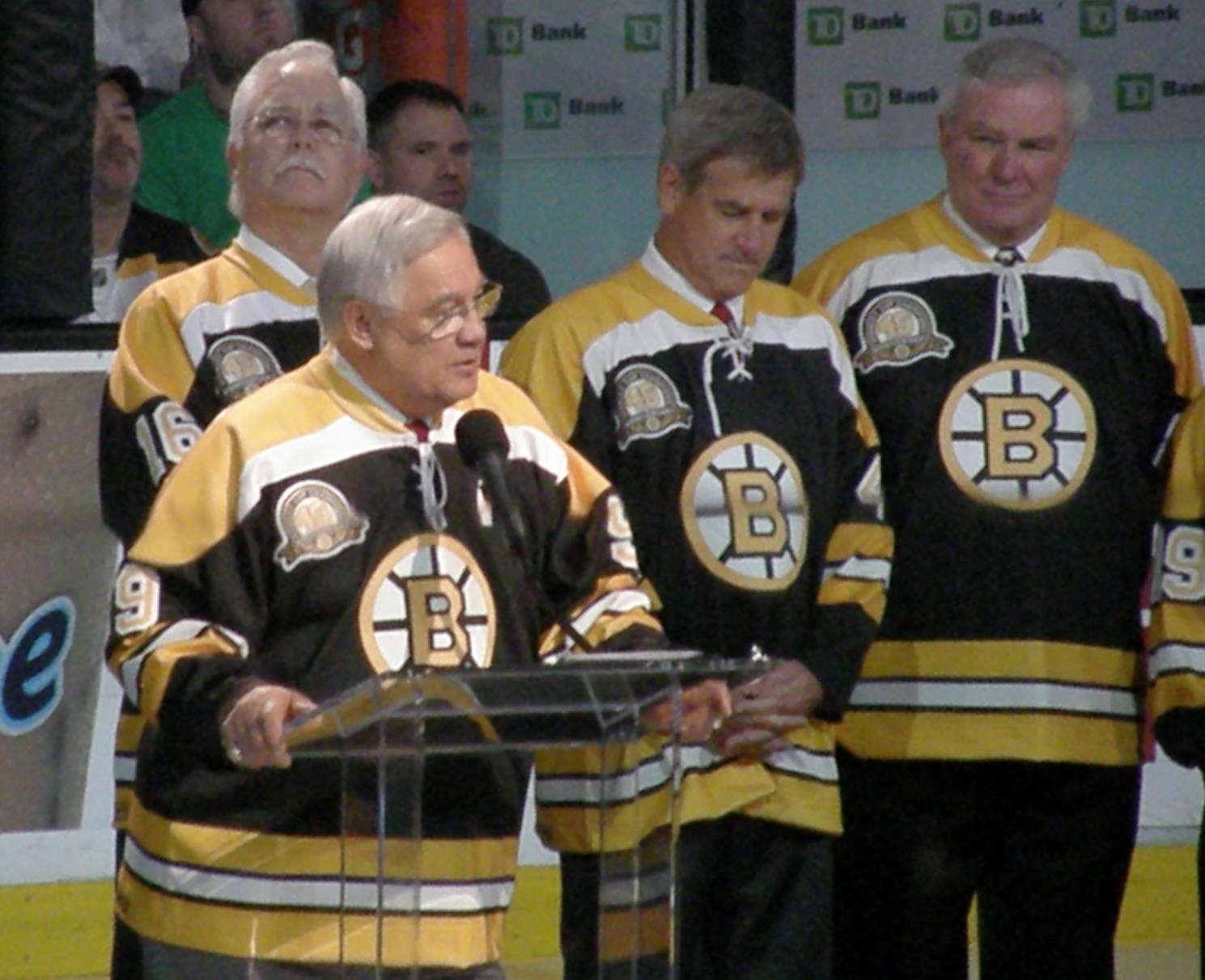
Orr (centre, background), stands next to Derek Sanderson, and Ken Hodge while listening to Johnny Bucyk's speech. Orr has maintained relations with several former teammates from his career.

Orr has been known to be fiercely loyal to former Bruin personnel and teammates. When Derek Sanderson had alcohol and prescription drug-abuse problems and wound up penniless, Orr spent his own money to ensure that Sanderson successfully completed rehab. Decades later, Orr and Sanderson went into business together managing finances for hockey players. Orr also helped out Bruins trainer John (Frosty) Forristall, his roommate during his first years with the Bruins, who had just been fired from the Tampa Bay Lightning for alcoholism in 1994. Forristall's drinking put him on bad terms with his brother John, so he returned to Boston jobless and soon afterwards was diagnosed with brain cancer. Orr took Forristall into his home for a year until he died at the age of 51. Orr was a pallbearer at his funeral.

During his playing days in the early 1970s, Orr was part owner of a steakhouse called the Branding Iron which was located in Boston. He and his teammates would frequently throw parties at the restaurant.

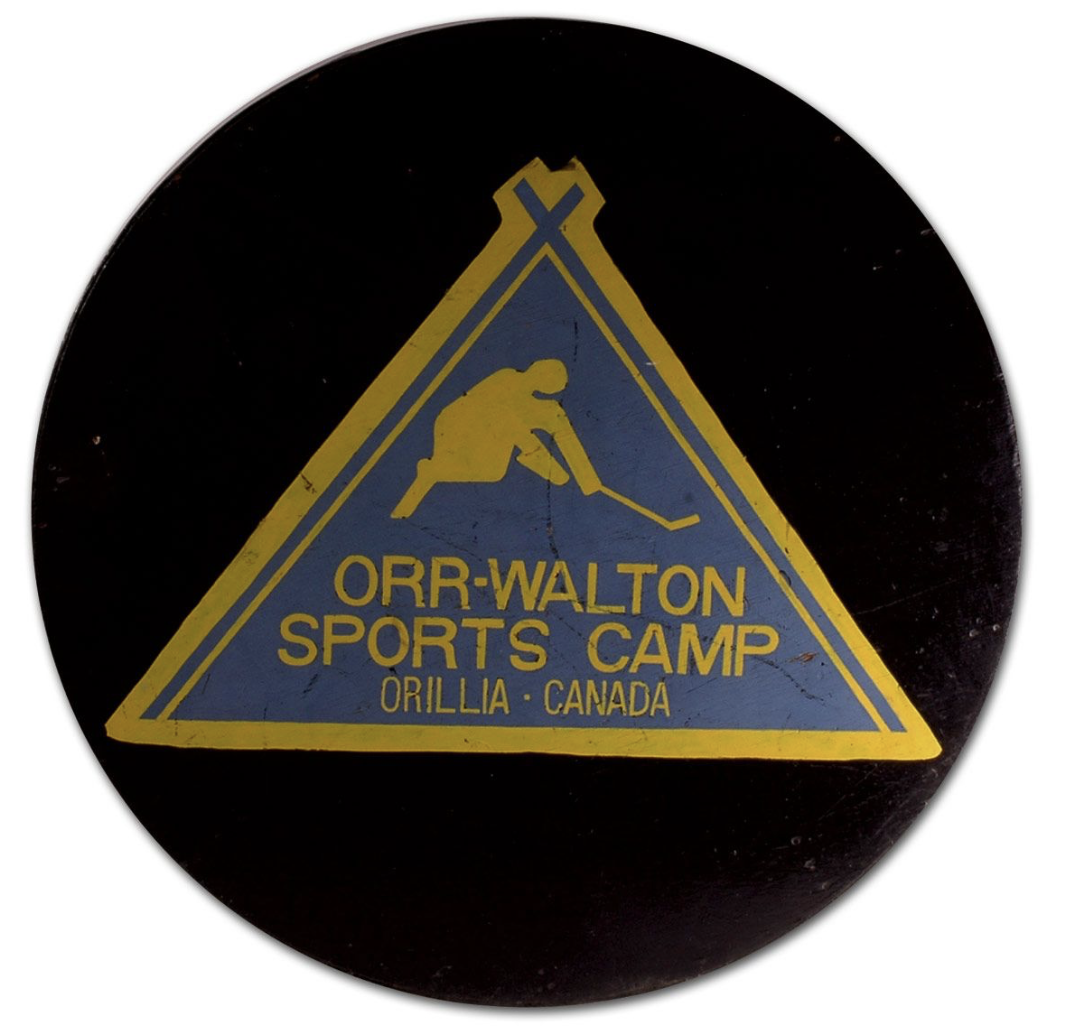
Orr-Walton Sports Camp

Orr is also well known for his charitable works, although he kept mention of them out of the press. Former Eagle-Tribune writer Russ Conway noted of one occasion when Orr and Conway visited Boston Children's Hospital, with a box of programs, pennants, pucks, pictures and Boston memorabilia: "We went from room to room, Orr popping in, unannounced to visit the kids. Some couldn't believe their eyes; sick as they were, they laughed in astonishment and delight. Bobby Orr! He talked and joked with every one of them, asking names, rubbing heads, giving everybody a little present from the box, leaving a stick, autographing everything in sight." Orr made Conway promise to not print a word in the newspaper. Orr was involved in numerous charity fund raisers. In 1980, Orr was awarded the Multiple Sclerosis Silver Hope Chest Award by the Multiple Sclerosis Society for his "numerous and unselfish contributions to society". Orr also enjoys serving as a mentor for youth hockey players. During his playing days, he and Mike Walton hosted and coached a hockey summer camp on Lake Couchiching at Orillia, Ontario. The camp ran from 1969 to 1978. Additionally Orr has been active with the Claddagh Fund, a charity organization he helped found alongside Dropkick Murphys vocalist Ken Casey. Together Orr and Casey have hosted multiple golf and hockey tournaments to raise funds for underfunded nonprofits in Massachusetts.

Among other personal interests, Orr has had a passion for fishing since childhood. He has a talent for solving jigsaw puzzles quickly. Orr is also known for his taste in clothes and style of dress. When living as a bachelor with Forristall during his years with the Bruins, Orr was also known for keeping a clean apartment and not drinking, smoking, or night-clubbing. Orr projected a clean image. He also remains involved in charitable efforts. Following his retirement from hockey Orr has become a regular on the golf course and has competed in multiple Pro–am and charity tournaments. For a period of time he was also a co-owner of a private Cape Cod golf community, The Ridge Club.

Orr provoked criticism in October 2020 when he took out a full-page ad in the New Hampshire Union-Leader exalting Donald Trump's character and urging American voters to re-elect him.

Orr used to spend winters in Florida and summer in Cape Cod. However, he and his wife bought a house in the Balsam Mountain Preserve located in North Carolina.

== Accomplishments and legacy ==
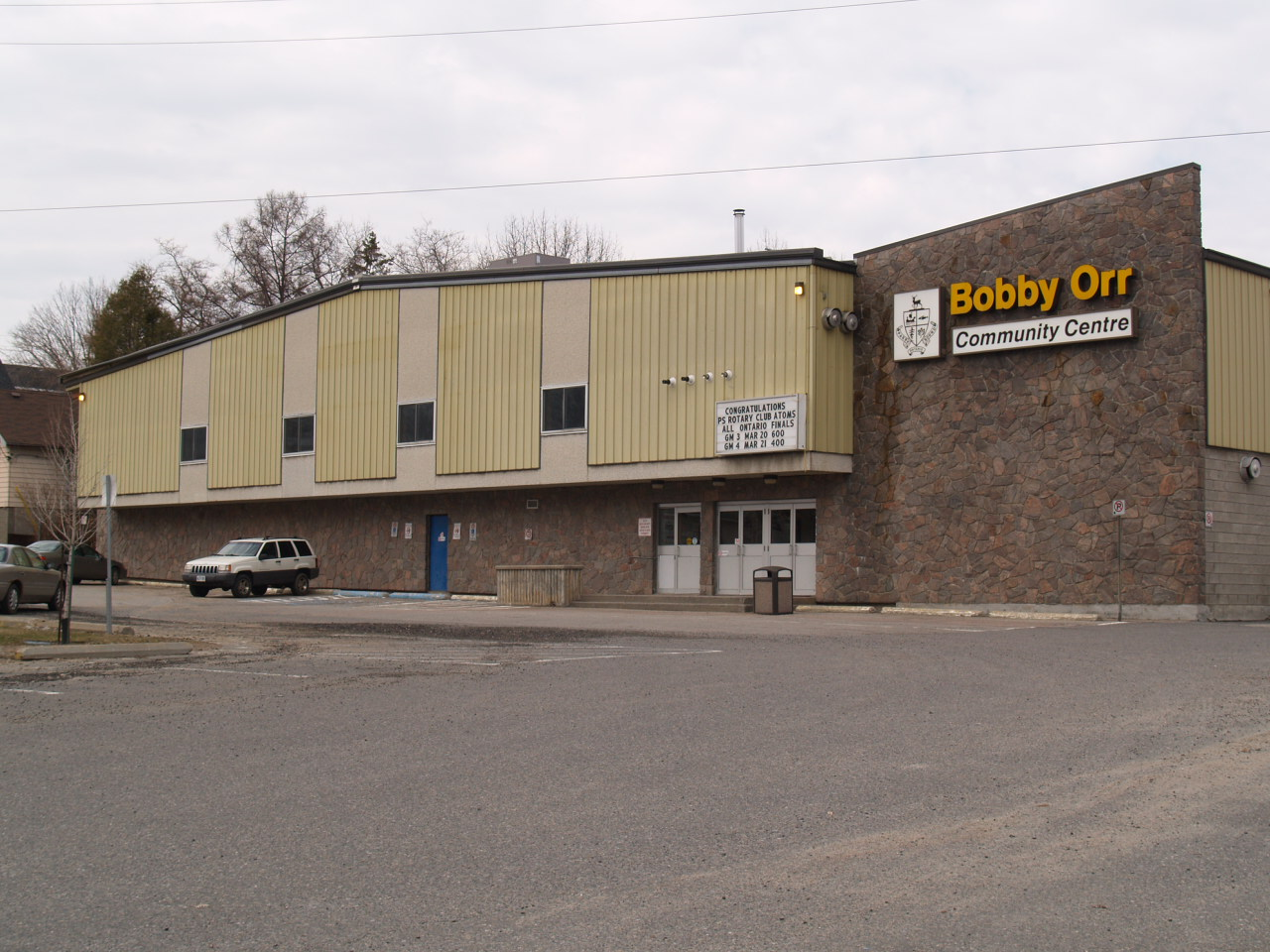
The Bobby Orr Community Center in Parry Sound, Ontario

Orr is one of the most successful and decorated athletes in history of the NHL. Hockey journalists Mike Moore wrote on Orr in 2011 stating "When Bobby Orr was at his peak, he was the best hockey player in the world. No other human was close. It was unbelievable how much better he was than anyone else in the pack behind. The NHL wasn’t good enough for Orr. Too bad there was no higher league."

His accomplishments include two Stanley Cup Championships with the Boston Bruins. He won the Hart Memorial Trophy as the league's Most Valuable Player three straight years from 1970 to 1972. Orr is the only defenceman in league history to win the Art Ross Trophy as league leader in scoring capturing the trophy in both 1970 and 1975. He is also the only player ever to win the Norris Trophy, Art Ross Trophy, Hart Trophy, and Conn Smythe Trophy in one season in 1970. He then became the first two-time winner of the Conn Smythe in 1972. During his rookie year in 1967 he won the Calder Memorial Trophy as the league's top rookie. He is the only defenceman to win the Lester B. Pearson Award, and was selected to the NHL first All-Star team eight straight years from 1968 to 1975.

Orr is often considered the greatest defenceman in NHL history, and won the Norris Trophy as the league's best defenceman a record eight straight years from 1968 to 1975. In a 2020 poll held by the NHL Orr was unanimously selected as the greatest defenceman of all time, senior writer for NHL.com Dan Rosen wrote "Orr revolutionized the position with his skating, speed, puck-handling and offensive ability. The Bruins defenseman turned defense into offense with a rapid acceleration better than arguably anyone in NHL history." He was voted the second greatest hockey player of all time by an expert committee in 1997 by The Hockey News, he was only behind Wayne Gretzky and ahead of Gordie Howe as well as being named the top defenceman of all time. Gretzky said he would have voted for Orr or his hero, Gordie Howe. In a separate poll held by The Hockey News in 2010 he was named the top defenceman of all time. In 2017, Orr was named by the NHL as one of the "100 Greatest NHL Players" in history. In 2023, The Athletic put Orr at #3 on their list of the 100 greatest hockey players of all time.

For his achievements Orr was named "Sportsman of the Year" by Sports Illustrated in 1970. That same year he also received the Lou Marsh Trophy as Canada's top athlete of the year. He was voted the greatest athlete in Boston history in the Boston Globe newspaper's poll of New Englanders in 1975, beating out baseball and basketball stars such as Ted Williams, Bill Russell, Carl Yastrzemski, and Bob Cousy. Additionally he was named Bostons greatest athlete by Bleacher Report and in a NESN poll in 2010. In 2022, as part of their SN Rushmore project, The Sporting News named Orr on their "Boston Mount Rushmore of Sports", along Boston Celtics basketball player Bill Russell, Boston Red Sox baseball player Ted Williams, and New England Patriots football player Tom Brady. Orr was ranked 31st in SportsCentury: 50 Greatest Athletes of the 20th Century.

Throughout his career Orr set many scoring milestones for defenceman. Before he entered the league in 1966, no defenceman had scored 20 goals in more than two decades. Orr was able to accomplish this feat in seven straight seasons. Being the first one to score 30 goals in a season (1969-70) and 40 goals (1974–75) in a season. During the 1970-71 season, Orr became the first player to record 100 assists in a season, he led the NHL in assists 5 times throughout his career. Orr was the first NHL player to have consecutive 100+ point seasons, in 1969–70 and 1970–71, and was the first defenceman to score 900 career points. The town of Dedham, Massachusetts, held a Bobby Orr Day on March 23, 1970.

He is often credited for altering the role of a defenceman being the first to have a sensational scoring ability. His former coach Don Cherry stated "He changed how defense should be played. He broke the mold because before that defensemen were big, slow guys. They just cleared the guys out and got the puck up. Bobby changed the whole face of the game and how it's played." Sports Illustrated's writer E.M. Swift wrote "He changed the sport by redefining the parameters of his position, "A defenseman, as interpreted by Orr, became both a defender and an aggressor, both a protector and a producer. Orr was more than an opportunist: He created opportunities."

Frank Deford also of Sports Illustrated added "As far as his place in history, "It's not necessary to get into who may be better, Orr, the defenseman, or Wayne Gretzky, the center, except to note that Orr did something that Gretzky had no opportunity to do, and that was change the very nature of the game."

=== Honors ===
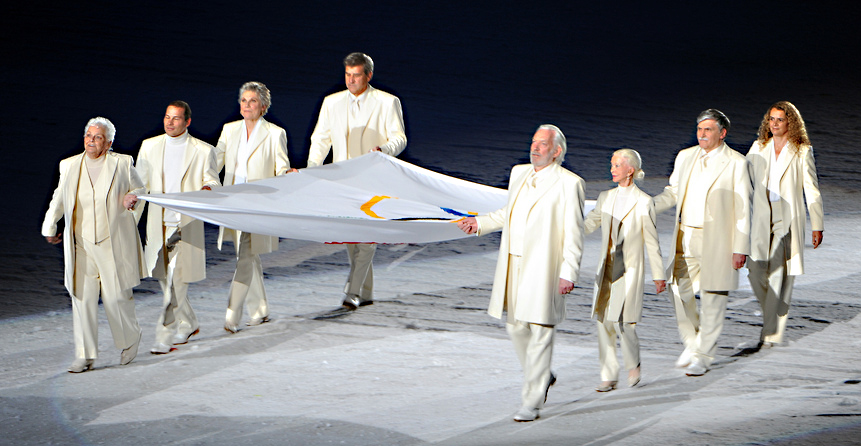
Orr (centre, back), one of eight Canadians to carry the Olympic flag during the 2010 Vancouver Olympics opening ceremonies

In 1970, Orr received the Golden Plate Award of the American Academy of Achievement. In 1979, Orr was invested as an officer of the Order of Canada. The official citation on why he received the honor reads, “For his unique achievements as a professional hockey player of international renown and for his interest in young athletes, to whom he devotes much of his spare time.” Two buildings in his hometown of Parry Sound are named after Orr. The first is the Bobby Orr Hall of Fame, where his Order of Canada medal is on display along with other exhibits, on Orr's childhood, charity work while also including multiple pieces of his memorabilia from his career. The second is the Bobby Orr Community Centre, a multi-purpose entertainment facility. Orr was inducted into Canada's Sports Hall of Fame as an individual in 1982, and as a member of Canada's Summit Series in 2005. In 1982, Orr received an honorary Doctor of Humane Letters degree from Siena University. In 1984, Orr was the commencement speaker for Northeastern University and received an honorary Doctor of Humanities degree. In 1995, Orr was inducted into the Ontario Sports Hall of Fame. He has also been honoured with a star on Canada's Walk of Fame in Toronto. In 2004, an elementary school in South Oshawa named after Orr opened.

On November 27, 2008, the Oshawa Generals retired Orr's number 2 jersey; the Generals had not issued the number since Orr transferred to the NHL in 1966. Orr thanked all who helped him in the four years he played in Oshawa: "I did a lot of growing up in Oshawa from ages 14 to 18 and I'll be forever grateful for those people who helped me in that time of my life." In 2004, Orr was ranked the 19th greatest Canadian in a poll by CBC which received more than 1.2 million votes.

Orr was one of eight Olympic flag bearers at the 2010 Winter Olympics opening ceremony. The Bobby Orr Trophy named in Orr's honor, is awarded annually to the champion of the Eastern conference playoffs in the Ontario Hockey League. The defunct CHL also awarded their own annual Bobby Orr trophy that was given to the league's best defenceman. In 2012, he received the Queen Elizabeth II Diamond Jubilee Medal. In 2014, Orr was one of 5 NHL defencemen to be honored on Canada's official set of Original Six era postage stamps. In 2024, Orr returned to TD Garden to take part in the Bruins Centennial celebrations as he was named to the Boston Bruins All-Centennial Team.

=== Statue ===
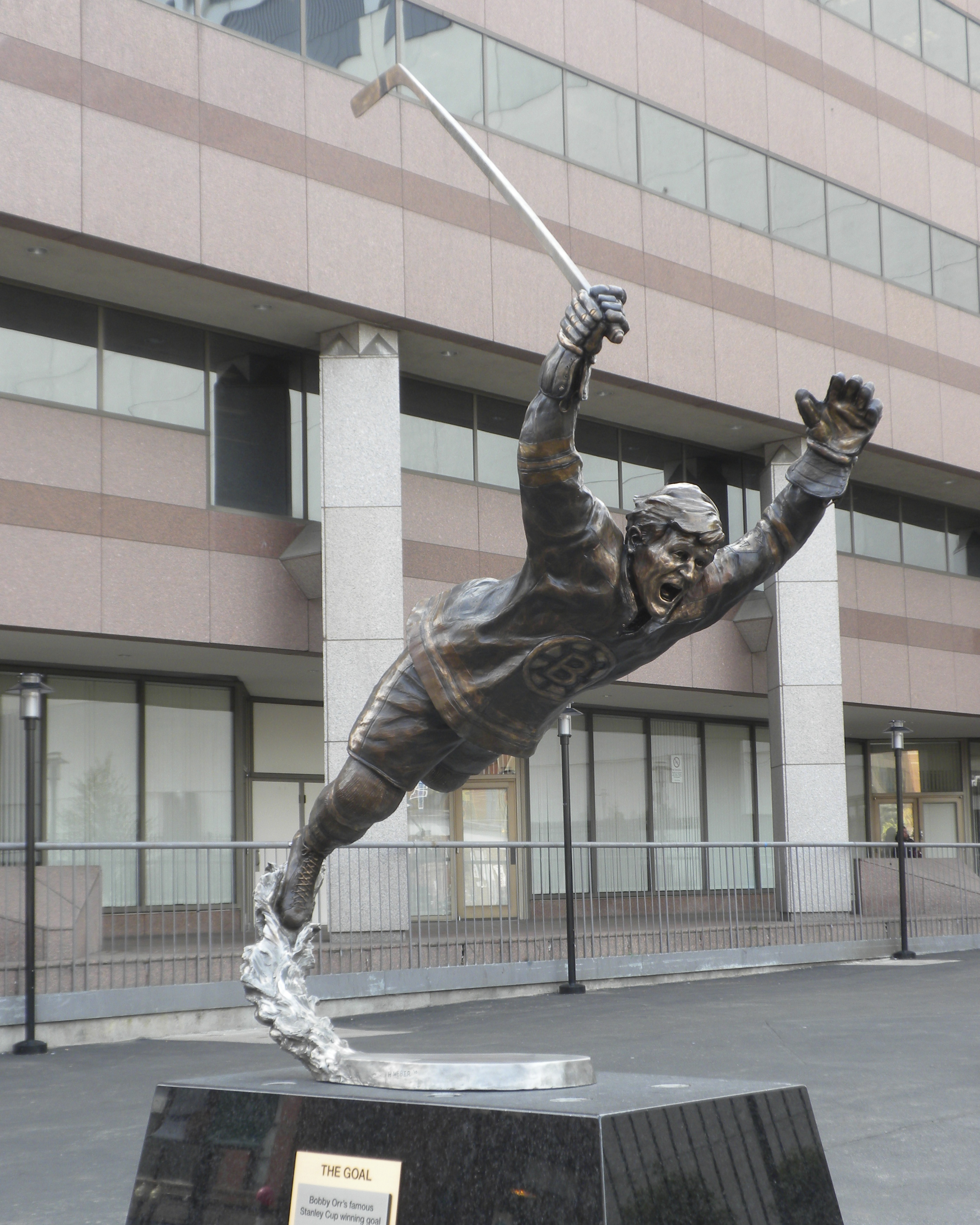
Orr's statue outside of the TD Garden

A bronze statue of Orr stands next to Boston's TD Garden, the Bruins' home arena. It was unveiled on May 10, 2010, the 40th anniversary of the Bruins' first Stanley Cup victory with Orr, and depicts him immediately after scoring the winning goal. The unveiling ceremony was attended by Orr and several of his former teammates. Orr said of the statue at the ceremony, "This specific moment and time we celebrate with this statue is something we can all now nostalgically remember with fondness, together, each time we enter Boston Garden. To all of you, thank you very much from the bottom of my heart. I'm honoured. Guys, thank you."

== Career achievements ==
Despite playing only twelve seasons and 657 games (of which only his first nine seasons, totalling 621 games, were full seasons), and only playing 47 games after his 27th birthday, Orr accomplished many records and achievements, a number of which still stand today, and are listed below.

As of the end of the 2018–19 season:

- First and only defenceman to score nine hat tricks.
- Only defenceman to win the Lester B. Pearson Award.
- Only player ever to win the Norris Trophy, Art Ross Trophy, Hart Trophy, and Conn Smythe Trophy in one season (1969–70)
- Only defenceman to win the Art Ross Trophy as league leader in scoring (1969–70, 1974–75)
- First defenceman to score 30 goals (1969–70) and 40 goals (1974–75) in a season.
- First player to record 100 assists in a season (1970–71)
- Highest single season plus-minus rating, +124 in 1970–71.
  - Second all-time in career plus-minus rating (+597; retired as the overall leader)
  - Never finished a full season less than +30 since +/- became a statistic (beginning with the 1968–69 season)
- Fourth in league history in career point-per-game average, all-time, (1.393) (highest among defencemen, minimum 500 career points).
- Sixty-sixth overall in league history in career assists and tied for 109th in career points.

=== Awards ===
- OHA first All-Star team – 1964, 1965, 1966
- J. Ross Robertson Cup champion (1966)
- Awarded the Calder Memorial Trophy (rookie of the year) in 1967, the youngest ever to win the award, and the youngest ever to win a major NHL award up to that time.
- Named to the NHL second All-Star team in 1967 (his only full season when he did not make the First Team, as a rookie)
- Won the Elizabeth C. Dufresne Trophy in 1967, 1970, 1972, 1974, 1975
- Played in the NHL All-Star Game in 1968, 1969, 1970, 1971, 1972, 1973, 1975
- Named to the NHL first All-Star team in 1968, 1969, 1970, 1971, 1972, 1973, 1974, 1975
- Won the James Norris Trophy in 1968, 1969, 1970, 1971, 1972, 1973, 1974, 1975
- NHL Plus/Minus leader in 1969, 1970, 1971, 1972, 1974, and 1975, the most in history.
- Won the Art Ross Trophy in 1970 and 1975
- Won the Hart Memorial Trophy in 1970, 1971, 1972
- Awarded the Conn Smythe Trophy in 1970 and 1972, the first two-time winner of the playoff MVP award
- Stanley Cup champion in 1970 and 1972
- Won Lionel Conacher Award as top male Canadian athlete of the year in 1970
- Won Lou Marsh Trophy as Canadian athlete of the year in 1970
- Received Sports Illustrated magazine's "Sportsman of the Year" award in 1970
- Received the Charlie Conacher Humanitarian Award in 1971 for his humanitarian contributions throughout his career.
- NHL All-Star Game MVP in 1972
- Bruins 3 Stars Awards in 1974, 1975
- Voted the greatest athlete in Boston history in the Boston Globe newspaper's poll of New Englanders in 1975.
- Awarded the Lester B. Pearson Award in 1975
- Named the Canada Cup Tournament MVP in 1976
- Awarded the Lester Patrick Trophy in 1979
- His #4 jersey number was retired by the Boston Bruins on January 9, 1979

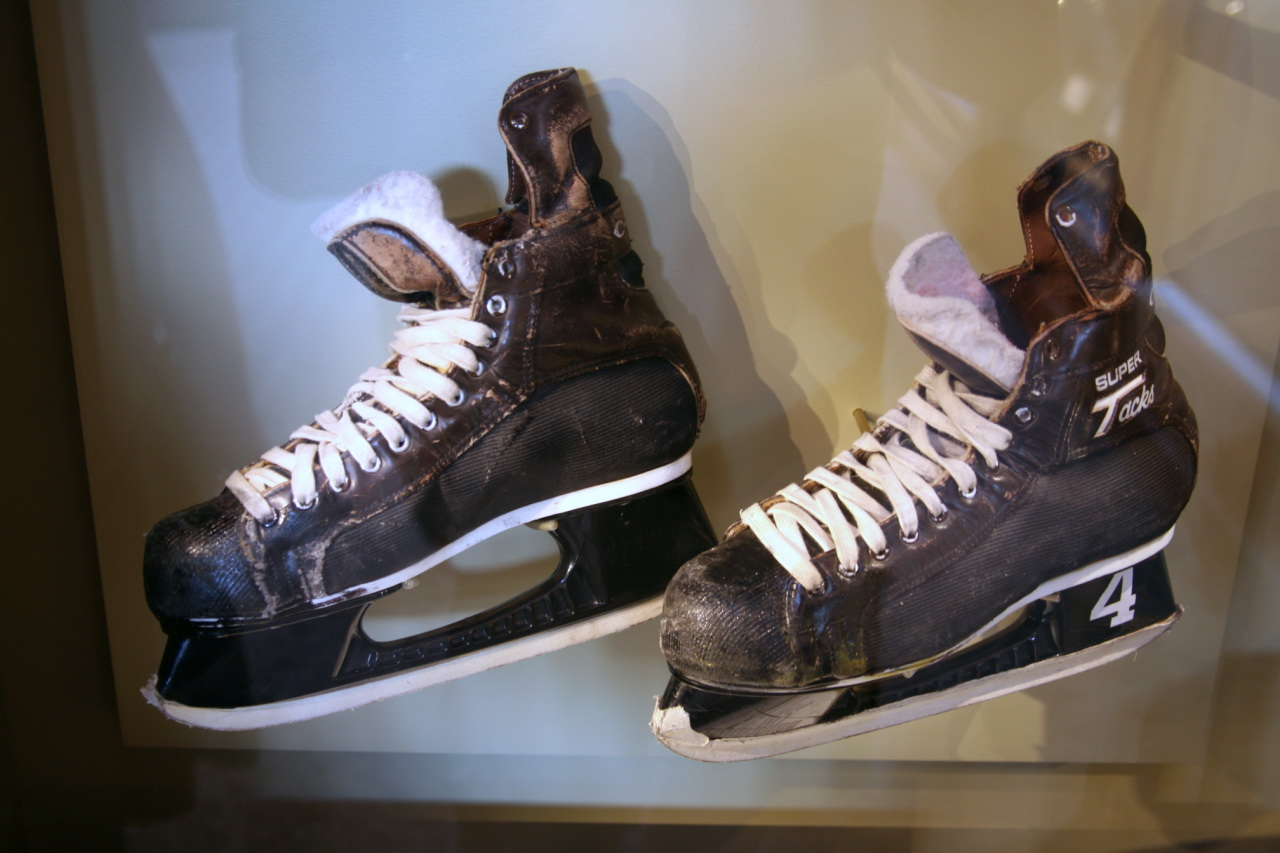
Skates used by Orr during the 1970s, at the Orr exhibit of the Hockey Hall of Fame. Orr was inducted into the Hall in 1979.

- Inducted into the Hockey Hall of Fame in 1979, with the mandatory three-year waiting period waived, making him the youngest inductee at 31 years of age.
- Inducted into the Canada's Sports Hall of Fame two times, first as an individual in 1982 and as a member of 1972 team Canada in 2005.
- Inducted into the Ontario Sports Hall of Fame in 1996.
- Voted the second greatest hockey player of all time by an expert committee in 1997 by The Hockey News, as well as being named the top defenceman of all time.
- Ranked 31st in ESPN's SportsCentury: 50 Greatest Athletes of the 20th Century in 1999
- His #2 jersey number was retired by the Oshawa Generals on November 27, 2008
- Named the top defenceman of all time in 2010 by The Hockey News
- Named the greatest Boston Athlete of all time by Bleacher Report in 2010
- Voted Boston's biggest sports legend in a 2010 poll held by NESN
- In 2017, Orr was named by the National Hockey League as one of the "100 Greatest NHL Players" in history.
- Named the third greatest hockey player of all time by The Athletic in 2023.
- Named One of the Top 100 Best Bruins Players of all Time.
- Named to the Boston Bruins All-Centennial Team

=== Records ===
- Most 100-point seasons by a defenceman (6, from 1969–70 to 1974–75).
- The only player to win four major NHL awards in one season (Hart, Norris, Art Ross, and Conn Smythe in 1970), as well as the only player to win the Norris and Art Ross in the same season.
- Fastest goal from start of overtime to clinch the Stanley Cup (0:40; 1970, game four)
- Most points in one NHL season by a defenceman (139; 1970–71)
- Most assists in one NHL season by a defenceman (102; 1970–71).
- Highest plus/minus in one NHL season (+124; 1970–71)
- Most assists in one NHL game by a defenceman (6; tied with Babe Pratt, Pat Stapleton, Ron Stackhouse, Paul Coffey, and Gary Suter)
- Most assists in one NHL game by a Bruin player (6; tied with David Pastrňák and Ken Hodge).

Records since surpassed

- Most goals in one NHL season by a defenceman from 1969 to 1986 (21, in 1968–69, 33 in 1969–70, 37 in 1970–71, broke own record in 1974–75 with 46; broken in 1985–86 by Paul Coffey with 48)
- Most assists in one NHL season from 1970 to 1981 (87 in 1969–70, which he surpassed in 1970–71 with 102; broken by Wayne Gretzky and also bettered by Mario Lemieux)
- Longest consecutive point-scoring streak by a defenceman from 1971 until 1984 (15 games, set in 1970–71 and 1973–74)
- Most points by a defenceman in one game from 1973 until 1977 (7) in game November 15, 1973)
- Held record for most consecutive 100-or-more point seasons by any player from 1974 until 1980 (6, from 1969–70 until 1974–75)
- Career plus-minus rating from 1978 until 1985 (+597)
- Career goal-scoring by a defenceman (270) until surpassed by Denis Potvin in 1986.

== Career statistics ==
=== Regular season and playoffs ===
- **Bold** indicates led league

			Regular season					Playoffs
Season	Team	League	GP	G	A	Pts	PIM	GP	G	A	Pts	PIM
1962–63	Oshawa Generals	Metro Jr.A	34	6	15	21	45	—	—	—	—	—
1963–64	Oshawa Generals	OHA	56	29	43	72	142	6	0	7	7	21
1964–65	Oshawa Generals	OHA	56	34	59	93	112	6	0	6	6	10
1965–66	Oshawa Generals	OHA	47	38	56	94	92	17	9	19	28	14
1966–67	Boston Bruins	NHL	61	13	28	41	102	—	—	—	—	—
1967–68	Boston Bruins	NHL	46	11	20	31	63	4	0	2	2	2
1968–69	Boston Bruins	NHL	67	21	43	64	133	10	1	7	8	10
1969–70	Boston Bruins	NHL	76	33	**87**	**120**	125	14	9	11	20	14
1970–71	Boston Bruins	NHL	78	37	**102**	139	91	7	5	7	12	25
1971–72	Boston Bruins	NHL	76	37	**80**	117	106	15	5	**19**	**24**	19
1972–73	Boston Bruins	NHL	63	29	72	101	99	5	1	1	2	7
1973–74	Boston Bruins	NHL	74	32	**90**	122	82	16	4	**14**	18	28
1974–75	Boston Bruins	NHL	80	46	**89**	**135**	101	3	1	5	6	2
1975–76	Boston Bruins	NHL	10	5	13	18	22	—	—	—	—	—
1976–77	Chicago Black Hawks	NHL	20	4	19	23	25	—	—	—	—	—
1978–79	Chicago Black Hawks	NHL	6	2	2	4	4	—	—	—	—	—
OHA totals			193	107	173	280	391	29	9	32	41	45
NHL totals			657	270	645	915	953	74	26	66	92	107

== International play ==
- Was named to Canada's 1972 Summit Series team, but did not play due to injuries.
- Played for Canada in the 1976 Canada Cup.

International statistics

Year	Team	Event	GP	G	A	Pts	PIM
1972	Canada	Summit Series	0	0	0	0	0
1976	Canada	Canada Cup	7	2	7	9	8

== See also ==
- List of NHL players with 100-point seasons

Awards
Preceded by Phil Esposito; Phil Esposito	Winner of the Art Ross Trophy; 1970; 1975	Succeeded by Phil Esposito; Guy Lafleur
Preceded by Brit Selby	Winner of the Calder Memorial Trophy; 1967	Succeeded by Derek Sanderson
Preceded by Serge Savard; Ken Dryden	Winner of the Conn Smythe Trophy; 1970; 1972	Succeeded by Ken Dryden; Yvan Cournoyer
Preceded by Phil Esposito	Winner of the Hart Memorial Trophy; 1970–1972	Succeeded by Bobby Clarke
Preceded by Bobby Clarke	Winner of the Lester B. Pearson Award; 1975	Succeeded by Guy Lafleur
Preceded by Harry Howell	Winner of the Norris Trophy; 1968–1975	Succeeded by Denis Potvin
