= Bobby Orr Trophy (CHL) =

The Bobby Orr Trophy represents the Central Hockey League's highest individual defensive award. Previously recognized as the CHL Most Valuable Defenseman Award, beginning with the 1979–80 CHL season, the Bobby Orr Trophy was named in honour of the Hockey Hall of Fame defenceman.

== List of winners ==
| Season | Winner | Team |
|---|---|---|
| 1963–64 | Barclay Plager | Omaha Knights |
| 1964–65 | Mike McMahon | St. Paul Rangers |
| 1965–66 | Al LeBrun | St. Paul Rangers |
| 1966–67 | Mike McMahon | Houston Apollos |
| 1967–68 | Bryan Watson | Houston Apollos |
| 1968–69 | Barry Gibbs | Oklahoma City Blazers |
| 1969–70 | Mike Robitaille | Omaha Knights |
| 1970–71 | Andre Dupont | Omaha Knights |
| 1971–72 | Bart Crashley | Dallas Black Hawks |
| 1972–73 | Len Frig | Dallas Black Hawks |
| 1973–74 | Claire Alexander | Oklahoma City Blazers |
| 1974–75 | Ian McKegney | Dallas Black Hawks |
| 1975–76 | Ian McKegney | Dallas Black Hawks |
| 1976–77 | Mike O'Connell | Dallas Black Hawks |
| 1977–78 | Larry Giroux | Kansas City Red Wings |
| 1978–79 | Greg Hubick | Dallas Black Hawks |
| 1979–80 | Bruce Affleck | Dallas Black Hawks |
| 1980–81 | Bruce Affleck | Indianapolis Checkers |
| 1981–82 | Dan Poulin | Nashville South Stars |
| 1982–83 | Gord Dineen | Indianapolis Checkers |
