= Central Hockey League (1963–1984) =

Minor pro league that operated in the United States from 1963 through 1984

- Sport: Ice hockey
- Founded: 1963
- Founder: Jack Adams
- Folded: 1984
- Countries: United States
- Last champion: Tulsa Oilers
- Most titles: (tie) Dallas Black Hawks (4)

The Central Professional Hockey League was a minor professional ice hockey league that operated in the United States from 1963 to 1984. Named the Central Hockey League for the 1968–69 season and forward, it was owned and operated by the National Hockey League and served as a successor to the Eastern Professional Hockey League, which had folded after the 1962–63 season. Four of the CHL's initial franchises were, in fact, relocations of the previous year's EPHL teams, while the fifth came from the International Hockey League. Its founding president was Jack Adams, who served in the role until his death in 1968. The CHL's championship trophy was called the Adams Cup in his honor.

== History ==
In the league's first season, all five teams were affiliated with an NHL club. The CHL initially consisted of the Indianapolis Capitals (Detroit Red Wings), Minneapolis Bruins (Boston Bruins), Omaha Knights (Montreal Canadiens), St. Louis Braves (Chicago Black Hawks) and the St. Paul Rangers (New York Rangers). The only NHL team without a CHL affiliate that year, the Toronto Maple Leafs, joined the league through its affiliation with the Tulsa Oilers in the CHL's second season.

After Adams's death, Emory Jones served as interim president until the appointment of lawyer Joe Kane in August 1968. Kane announced the league was changing its name on September 26, 1968, dropping Professional from the title. He served one year as president, retiring in June 1969. Kane was succeeded by Jones, who held the job until retiring in 1974. Max McNab served as league president from 1974 until becoming general manager of the Washington Capitals during his second season. Ray Miron was hired as president in August 1976, but resigned less than three weeks later to accept the job as general manager of the Colorado Rockies. Before the end of the month, Bud Poile became league president and would hold the job until the CHL folded in 1984.

For the 1974–75 season, the CHL absorbed three teams, the Denver Spurs, Salt Lake Golden Eagles, and Seattle Totems, from the folding Western Hockey League. Salt Lake would stay in the league until the end and would continue in the International Hockey League for the 1984–85 season, after the CHL ceased operations. Denver and Seattle were admitted to the CHL as a steppingstone for their eventual admission to the NHL in 1976; however, the league never followed through on the expansion, and both teams folded after 1975. For 1979–80, the CHL added the Cincinnati Stingers and Birmingham Bulls, the two teams from the World Hockey Association that were not admitted to the NHL that year.

Also during the 1979–80 season, the United States Olympic hockey team played games against each team in the CHL that counted in the standings. The team went on to win the gold medal at the 1980 Winter Olympics. In the 1983–84 season, both the U.S. and Canadian Olympic hockey teams played games in the CHL.

The CHL's final champions, the Tulsa Oilers, were left without a home during their championship 1983–84 season when the team owners went into receivership. The league stepped in to keep the team operating, and the Oilers played all their games on the road from mid-February through the end of the playoffs. Their Cup-winning game on April 27, 1984, was the last game played in the CHL. The league folded the following month.

== Teams ==
- Albuquerque Six-Guns (1973–1974)
- Amarillo Wranglers (1968–1969, 1970–1971)
- Birmingham Bulls (1979–1981)
- Birmingham South Stars (1982–1983)
- Cincinnati Stingers (1979–1980)
- Cincinnati Tigers (1981–1982)
- Cincinnati Wings (1963–1964)
- Colorado Flames (1982–1984)
- Dallas Black Hawks (1967–1982)
- Denver Spurs (1974–1975)
- Fort Worth Texans (1974–1982)
- Fort Worth Wings (1967–1974)
- Houston Apollos (1965–1969; 1979–1981)
- Indianapolis Capitals (1963–1964) (became Cincinnati Wings mid-season)
- Indianapolis Checkers (1979–1984)
- Iowa Stars (1969–1970)
- Kansas City Blues (1967–1972; 1976–1977)
- Kansas City Red Wings (1977–1979)
- Memphis South Stars (1967–1969)
- Memphis Wings (1964–1967)
- Minneapolis Bruins (1963–1965)
- Minnesota Rangers (1965–1966)
- Montana Magic (1983–1984)
- Nashville South Stars (1981–1982)
- Oklahoma City Blazers (1965–1972, 1973–1977)
- Oklahoma City Stars (1978–1982)
- Omaha Knights* (1963–1965)
- Omaha Knights* (1966–1975)
- Phoenix Roadrunners (1977–1978)
- St. Louis Braves (1963–1967)
- St. Paul Rangers (1963–1965)
- Salt Lake Golden Eagles (1974–1984)
- Seattle Totems (1974–1975)
- Tucson Mavericks (1975–1976)
- Tulsa Oilers (1964–1984)
- Wichita Wind (1980–1983)

* There were two separate franchised that were called 'Omaha Knights'

== Adams Cup champions ==
- 1984 — (Tulsa) Oilers ‡
- 1983 — Indianapolis Checkers
- 1982 — Indianapolis Checkers
- 1981 — Salt Lake Golden Eagles
- 1980 — Salt Lake Golden Eagles
- 1979 — Dallas Black Hawks
- 1978 — Fort Worth Texans
- 1977 — Kansas City Blues
- 1976 — Tulsa Oilers
- 1975 — Salt Lake Golden Eagles
- 1974 — Dallas Black Hawks
- 1973 — Omaha Knights
- 1972 — Dallas Black Hawks
- 1971 — Omaha Knights
- 1970 — Omaha Knights
- 1969 — Dallas Black Hawks
- 1968 — Tulsa Oilers
- 1967 — Oklahoma City Blazers
- 1966 — Oklahoma City Blazers
- 1965 — St. Paul Rangers
- 1964 — Omaha Knights

‡ Oilers team was left without a home after its owners in Tulsa went into receivership; played the last two months of the season and all playoff games as a road team, with salaries and expenses paid by the league.

== Annual awards ==
- Adams Cup – Awarded to the CHL Championship team
- Tommy Ivan Trophy – Most Valuable Player
- Phil Esposito Trophy – Leading Scorer during the Regular Season
- Bobby Orr Trophy – Most Valuable Defenseman
- Bob Gassoff Trophy – Most Improved Defenseman
- Terry Sawchuk Trophy – Top Goaltender(s) on the Best Defensive Team (lowest GAA)
- Ken McKenzie Trophy – Rookie of the Year
- Don Ashby Memorial Trophy – Iron Man Award
- Max McNab Trophy – Most Valuable Player in the Adams Cup playoffs
- Jake Milford Trophy – Coach of the Year
- Clarence Campbell Trophy – CHL franchise that best exemplifies professionalism in hockey
